= 2022 Vietnam Open =

Tournament details
- Dates: 27 September – 2 October
- Edition: 18th
- Level: Super 100
- Total prize money: US$75,000
- Venue: Nguyen Du Cultural Sports Club
- Location: Ho Chi Minh City, Vietnam

Champions
- Men's singles: (Japan) Kodai Naraoka
- Women's singles: (Vietnam) Nguyễn Thùy Linh
- Men's doubles: (China) Ren Xiangyu (China) Tan Qiang
- Women's doubles: (Thailand) Benyapa Aimsaard (Thailand) Nuntakarn Aimsaard
- Mixed doubles: (Indonesia) Dejan Ferdinansyah (Indonesia) Gloria Emanuelle Widjaja

The 2022 Vietnam Open (officially known as the Yonex-Sunrise Vietnam Open 2022 for sponsorship reasons) was a badminton tournament which took place at Nguyen Du Cultural Sports Club in Ho Chi Minh City, Vietnam, from 27 September to 2 October 2022 and had a total purse of $75,000.

== Tournament ==
The 2022 Vietnam Open was the third Super 100 tournament of the 2022 BWF World Tour and also part of the Vietnam Open championships, which had been held since 1996. This tournament was organized by the Vietnam Badminton Association and sanctioned by the BWF.

=== Venue ===
This tournament was held at Nguyen Du Cultural Sports Club in Ho Chi Minh City, Vietnam.

=== Point distribution ===
Below is the point distribution table for each phase of the tournament based on the BWF points system for the BWF Tour Super 100 event.

Winner	Runner-up	3/4	5/8	9/16	17/32	33/64	65/128	129/256
5,500	4,680	3,850	3,030	2,110	1,290	510	240	100

=== Prize pool ===
The total prize money was US$75,000 with the distribution of the prize money in accordance with BWF regulations.

Event	Winner	Finalist	Semi-finals	Quarter-finals	Last 16
Singles	$5,625	$2,850	$1,087.5	$450	$262.5
Doubles	$5,925	$2,850	$1,050	$543.75	$281.25

== Men's singles ==
=== Seeds ===
1. (Japan) Kanta Tsuneyama (Withdrew)
2. (India) B. Sai Praneeth (Second round)
3. (Japan) Kodai Naraoka (Champion)
4. (Indonesia) Tommy Sugiarto (Second round)
5. (India) Parupalli Kashyap (Withdrew)
6. (China) Weng Hongyang (Semi-finals)
7. (Malaysia) Soong Joo Ven (Second round)
8. (India) Mithun Manjunath (Second round)

=== Finals ===
Semi-finals
(China) Sun Feixiang	21	21
(Malaysia) Cheam June Wei	11	17
3	(Japan) Kodai Naraoka	21	21
6	(China) Weng Hongyang	18	14

Final
(China) Sun Feixiang	21	14	17
3	(Japan) Kodai Naraoka	10	21	21

=== Top half ===
==== Section 1 ====
First round
(India) R Y Chittaboina	15	0^{r}
Q2	(Vietnam) Trần L M A	21	0
Q3	(Vietnam) Nguyễn T T	21	9	17
(Malaysia) Lee S Y	11	21	21
Q4	(Vietnam) Trần Q K	10	16
(Singapore) J Teh	21	21
(Vietnam) Nguyễn T M	18	18
(China) Sun FX	21	21

Second round
1	(Japan) K Tsuneyama
Q2	(Vietnam) Trần L M A	w	/	o
(India) P Rajawat	17	16
(Malaysia) Lee S Y	21	21
7	(Malaysia) Soong J V	0^{r}
(Singapore) J Teh	3
PFQ	(India) Ro Mariswamy	15	13
(China) Sun FX	21	21

Third round
Q2	(Vietnam) Trần L M A	12	15
(Malaysia) Lee S Y	21	21
(Singapore) J Teh	10	15
(China) Sun FX	21	21

Quarter-finals
(Malaysia) Lee S Y	17	22
(China) Sun FX	21	24

==== Section 2 ====
First round
(India) K George	1^{r}
(India) S Subramanian	14
(Malaysia) S Shaqeem	21	16	15
(Chinese Taipei) Lee C-h	19	21	21
(India) S Dey	10	21	10
(India) K K Mekala	21	15	21
(India) A Singh	19	14
(Malaysia) Cheam J W	21	21

Second round
4	(Indonesia) T Sugiarto	21	20	12
(India) S Subramanian	14	22	21
(India) Ra Mariswamy	16	15
(Chinese Taipei) Lee C-h	21	21
PFQ	(Myanmar) Phone P N	21	14	19
(India) K K Mekala	16	21	21
(Malaysia) Leong J H	15	14
(Malaysia) Cheam J W	21	21

Third round
(India) S Subramanian	17	9
(Chinese Taipei) Lee C-h	21	21
(India) K K Mekala	15	10
(Malaysia) Cheam J W	21	21

Quarter-finals
(Chinese Taipei) Lee C-h	20	27	20
(Malaysia) Cheam J W	22	25	22

=== Bottom half ===
==== Section 3 ====
First round
(India) N S Iyer	10	16
(Malaysia) Kok J H	21	21
(Chinese Taipei) Chi Y-j	21	21
Q6	(Vietnam) Nguyễn T T	5	12
(India) H Aggarwal	19	21	21
Q5	(Vietnam) Nguyễn V M	21	16	18
(Hong Kong) Chan Y C	21	25
Q8	(Vietnam) Nguyễn Đ H	13	23

Second round
(Malaysia) Kok J H	16	21	14
(India) M L Maisnam	21	18	21
(Chinese Taipei) Chi Y-j	21	21
8	(India) M Manjunath	17	7
(India) H Aggarwal	21	21
(Mongolia) B Munkhbat	15	13
(Hong Kong) Chan Y C	13	6
3	(Japan) K Naraoka	21	21

Third round
(India) M L Maisnam	8	20
(Chinese Taipei) Chi Y-j	21	22
(India) H Aggarwal	15	6
3	(Japan) K Naraoka	21	21

Quarter-finals
(Chinese Taipei) Chi Y-j	21	11	14
3	(Japan) K Naraoka	18	21	21

==== Section 4 ====
First round
Q7	(Vietnam) Phan P T	13	13
(Thailand) K Laotrakul	21	21
(Malaysia) S Aidil	18	21	21
(Vietnam) Lê Đ P	21	18	11
(Malaysia) Lim C K	28	13
(Malaysia) Ong K Y	30	21
(India) R Sanjeevi	21	21
Q1	(Vietnam) Bùi T Đ	7	13

Second round
(Thailand) K Laotrakul	13	15
(Vietnam) Nguyễn H Đ	21	21
(Malaysia) S Aidil	15	9
6	(China) Weng HY	21	21
(Malaysia) Ong K Y	21	21
(India) Aman F S	10	11
(India) R Sanjeevi	17	21	21
2	(India) B. Sai Praneeth	21	18	13

Third round
(Vietnam) Nguyễn H Đ	16	15
6	(China) Weng HY	21	21
(Malaysia) Ong K Y	19	21	21
(India) R Sanjeevi	21	17	19

Quarter-finals
6	(China) Weng HY	21	21
(Malaysia) Ong K Y	10	17

== Women's singles ==
=== Seeds ===
1. (Japan) Aya Ohori (Quarter-finals)
2. (India) Saina Nehwal (Withdrew)
3. (Indonesia) Putri Kusuma Wardani (Withdrew)
4. (Indonesia) Ruselli Hartawan (Quarter-finals)
5. (Malaysia) Kisona Selvaduray (Quarter-finals)
6. (Vietnam) Nguyễn Thùy Linh (Champion)
7. (Malaysia) Goh Jin Wei (Final)
8. (India) Ashmita Chaliha (Withdrew)

=== Finals ===
Semi-finals
(Vietnam) Vũ Thị Trang	15	16
6	(Vietnam) Nguyễn Thùy Linh	21	21
7	(Malaysia) Goh Jin Wei	12	21	21
(Vietnam) Trần Thị Phương Thùy	21	17	14

Final
6	(Vietnam) Nguyễn Thùy Linh	21	21
7	(Malaysia) Goh Jin Wei	15	13

=== Top half ===
==== Section 1 ====
First round
1	(Japan) A Ohori	21	21
(India) A Rawat	12	16
PFQ	(Vietnam) Nguyễn T N L	16	14
(India) P Neeluri	21	21
PFQ	(Indonesia) D B Anjani	18	4
(Vietnam) Vũ T T	21	21
Q3
(India) Gadde R S	w	/	o

Second round
1	(Japan) A Ohori	21	21
(India) P Neeluri	3	7
(Vietnam) Vũ T T	15	21	21
(India) Gadde R S	21	18	17

Quarter-finals
1	(Japan) A Ohori	19	14
(Vietnam) Vũ T T	21	21

==== Section 2 ====
First round
4	(Indonesia) R Hartawan	21	21
(Indonesia) F Iwasaki	16	15
(Malaysia) V Radhakrishnan	21	21
Q1	(Vietnam) Nguyễn T C T	9	15
6	(Vietnam) Nguyễn T L	21	21
(Vietnam) Phạm T D L	12	15
(Hong Kong) Ng T Y	21	21
(India) S Panwar	19	14

Second round
4	(Indonesia) R Hartawan	21	21
(Malaysia) V Radhakrishnan	11	16
6	(Vietnam) Nguyễn T L	21	21
(Hong Kong) Ng T Y	7	6

Quarter-finals
4	(Indonesia) R Hartawan	21	14	19
6	(Vietnam) Nguyễn T L	17	21	21

=== Bottom half ===
==== Section 3 ====
First round
(India) I Sharma	21	21
Q2	(Vietnam) Trần T Á	13	14
(Thailand) P Opatniput	18	21	21
7	(Malaysia) Goh J W	21	13	23
(Malaysia) K Radhakrishnan	w	/	o
Q4
(Vietnam) Vũ T A T	19	21	21
PFQ	(Vietnam) Lê N V	21	14	11

Second round
(India) I Sharma	18	10
7	(Malaysia) Goh J W	21	21
(Malaysia) K Radhakrishnan	9	8
(Vietnam) Vũ T A T	21	21

Quarter-finals
7	(Malaysia) Goh J W	9	21	21
(Vietnam) Vũ T A T	21	10	7

==== Section 4 ====
First round
(Myanmar) Thet Htar T	22	22
(Indonesia) Y Y Susanto	20	20
(India) A Upadhyaya	21	18	16
5	(Malaysia) Kisona S	15	21	21
(Hong Kong) Yeung S Y	21	14	19
(Vietnam) Trần T P T	16	21	21
(India) R Das	21	21
PFQ	(Vietnam) Bùi B P	12	17

Second round
(Myanmar) Thet Htar T	21	18	18
5	(Malaysia) Kisona S	16	21	21
(Vietnam) Trần T P T	21	21
(India) R Das	15	16

Quarter-finals
5	(Malaysia) Kisona S	19	7
(Vietnam) Trần T P T	21	21

== Men's doubles ==
=== Seeds ===
1. (Indonesia) Sabar Karyaman Gutama / Muhammad Reza Pahlevi Isfahani (Semi-finals)
2. (China) He Jiting / Zhou Haodong (Final)
3. (Malaysia) Junaidi Arif / Muhammad Haikal (Semi-finals)
4. (China) Ren Xiangyu / Tan Qiang (Champions)
5. (Japan) Mahiro Kaneko / Keigo Sonoda (Quarter-finals)
6. (Indonesia) Wahyu Nayaka / Hardianto (Second round)
7. (Thailand) Weeraphat Phakjarung / Wongsathorn Thongkham (First round)
8. (Singapore) Andy Kwek / Loh Kean Hean (Second round)

=== Finals ===
Semi-finals
1	(Indonesia) Sabar Karyaman Gutama (Indonesia) Muhammad Reza Pahlevi Isfahani	14	17
4	(China) Ren Xiangyu (China) Tan Qiang	21	21
3	(Malaysia) Junaidi Arif (Malaysia) Muhammad Haikal	17	14
2	(China) He Jiting (China) Zhou Haodong	21	21

Final
4	(China) Ren Xiangyu (China) Tan Qiang	17	21	21
2	(China) He Jiting (China) Zhou Haodong	21	18	8

=== Top half ===
==== Section 1 ====
First round
(Vietnam) Nguyễn Đ H P (Vietnam) Trần N C T	11	13
(Vietnam) Nguyễn Đ H (Vietnam) Trần Đ M	21	21
5	(Japan) M Kaneko (Japan) K Sonoda	21	21
(Malaysia) Tan K X (Malaysia) Tan Y H	8	9
(Hong Kong) Chang T C (Hong Kong) Hung K C	21	21
(India) S V Govindarasu (India) G Venkadeshwaran	7	10

Second round
1	(Indonesia) S K Gutama (Indonesia) M R P Isfahani	21	21
(Vietnam) Nguyễn Đ H (Vietnam) Trần Đ M	16	14
5	(Japan) M Kaneko (Japan) K Sonoda	21	21
(Hong Kong) Chang T C (Hong Kong) Hung K C	12	13

Quarter-finals
1	(Indonesia) S K Gutama (Indonesia) M R P Isfahani	19	25	21
5	(Japan) M Kaneko (Japan) K Sonoda	21	23	18

==== Section 2 ====
First round
(Malaysia) Boon X Y (Malaysia) Wong T C	21	21
(Vietnam) Kim T (Vietnam) Trần T T	11	12
6	(Indonesia) W Nayaka (Indonesia) Hardianto	w	/	o
(Vietnam) Bảo M (Vietnam) Dương B Đ
(Hong Kong) Law C H (Hong Kong) Yeung S C	21	19	21
(Malaysia) Chang Y J (Malaysia) Yap R K	18	21	16

Second round
4	(China) Ren XY (China) Tan Q	14	21	21
(Malaysia) Boon X Y (Malaysia) Wong T C	21	6	15
6	(Indonesia) W Nayaka (Indonesia) Hardianto	18	13
(Hong Kong) Law C H (Hong Kong) Yeung S C	21	21

Quarter-finals
4	(China) Ren XY (China) Tan Q	21	21
(Hong Kong) Law C H (Hong Kong) Yeung S C	12	19

=== Bottom half ===
==== Section 3 ====
First round
(Malaysia) Chia W J (Malaysia) Low H Y	21	21
(Malaysia) J Chong (Malaysia) Tan M K	14	11
(Malaysia) Goh V S (Malaysia) Lim K W	21	21
7	(Thailand) W Phakjarung (Thailand) W Thongkham	17	15
(Indonesia) P A S Dadiara (Indonesia) B S Elohim	21	16	11
(Malaysia) Lee Y B (Malaysia) Ling W J	19	21	21

Second round
(Malaysia) Chia W J (Malaysia) Low H Y	19	21	14
(Malaysia) Goh V S (Malaysia) Lim K W	21	15	21
(Malaysia) Lee Y B (Malaysia) Ling W J	12	16
3	(Malaysia) J Arif (Malaysia) M Haikal	21	21

Quarter-finals
(Malaysia) Goh V S (Malaysia) Lim K W	17	21	14
3	(Malaysia) J Arif (Malaysia) M Haikal	21	19	21

==== Section 4 ====
First round
(Vietnam) Nguyễn T S (Vietnam) Nguyễn V K	11	11
(Malaysia) N M Azriyn A (Malaysia) Low J S	21	21
(Vietnam) Bách G H (Vietnam) Phạm V H	16	15
8	(Singapore) A Kwek (Singapore) Loh K H	21	21
(India) H Amsakarunan (India) R K Rethnasabapathi	21	21
(India) S Gajendran (India) M Kathiravan	12	14

Second round
(Malaysia) N M Azriyn A (Malaysia) Low J S	21	21
8	(Singapore) A Kwek (Singapore) Loh K H	18	12
(India) H Amsakarunan (India) R K Rethnasabapathi	17	13
2	(China) He JT (China) Zhou HD	21	21

Quarter-finals
(Malaysia) N M Azriyn A (Malaysia) Low J S	10	21	19
2	(China) He JT (China) Zhou HD	21	19	21

== Women's doubles ==
=== Seeds ===
1. (Thailand) Benyapa Aimsaard / Nuntakarn Aimsaard (Champions)
2. (Indonesia) Febriana Dwipuji Kusuma / Amalia Cahaya Pratiwi (Final)
3. (Singapore) Jin Yujia / Crystal Wong (Semi-finals)
4. (India) Simran Singhi / Ritika Thaker (Withdrew)
5. (Indonesia) Lanny Tria Mayasari / Ribka Sugiarto (Second round)
6. (Indonesia) Nita Violina Marwah / Tryola Nadia (Quarter-finals)
7. (Japan) Riko Imai / Maiko Kawazoe (Quarter-finals)
8. (India) Sanyogita Ghorpade / Priya Konjengbam (Withdrew)

=== Finals ===
Semi-finals
1	(Thailand) Benyapa Aimsaard (Thailand) Nuntakarn Aimsaard	20	21	21
3	(Singapore) Jin Yujia (Singapore) Crystal Wong	22	18	7
(Hong Kong) Lui Lok Lok (Hong Kong) Ng Wing Yung	9	12
2	(Indonesia) Febriana Dwipuji Kusuma (Indonesia) Amalia Cahaya Pratiwi	21	21

Final
1	(Thailand) Benyapa Aimsaard (Thailand) Nuntakarn Aimsaard	21	27
2	(Indonesia) Febriana Dwipuji Kusuma (Indonesia) Amalia Cahaya Pratiwi	16	25

=== Top half ===
==== Section 1 ====
First round

Second round
1	(Thailand) B Aimsaard (Thailand) N Aimsaard	21	21
(Vietnam) Nguyễn T N L (Vietnam) Thân V A	8	11
7	(Japan) R Imai (Japan) M Kawazoe	21	21
(Hong Kong) Leung S L (Hong Kong) Ng S Y	13	7

Quarter-finals
1	(Thailand) B Aimsaard (Thailand) N Aimsaard	21	21
7	(Japan) R Imai (Japan) M Kawazoe	16	15

==== Section 2 ====
First round
(Vietnam) Phạm T D L (Vietnam) Trần T Á	11	9
(Malaysia) K Radhakrishnan (Malaysia) V Radhakrishnan	21	21

Second round
3	(Singapore) Jin YJ (Singapore) C Wong	19	21	21
(Hong Kong) Fan K Y (Hong Kong) Y M Ying	21	12	9
6	(Indonesia) N V Marwah (Indonesia) T Nadia	21	21
(Malaysia) K Radhakrishnan (Malaysia) V Radhakrishnan	8	16

Quarter-finals
3	(Singapore) Jin YJ (Singapore) C Wong	21	21
6	(Indonesia) N V Marwah (Indonesia) T Nadia	18	17

=== Bottom half ===
==== Section 3 ====
First round
(Vietnam) Nguyễn H T K (Vietnam) Nguyễn T A Đ	16	11
(Hong Kong) Lui L L (Hong Kong) Ng W Y	21	21

Second round
(Hong Kong) Lui L L (Hong Kong) Ng W Y	21	21
5	(Indonesia) L T Mayasari (Indonesia) R Sugiarto	17	13
(Vietnam) Lâm M T (Vietnam) Lê N V	w	/	o
4	(India) S Singhi (India) R Thaker

Quarter-finals
(Hong Kong) Lui L L (Hong Kong) Ng W Y	21	21
(Vietnam) Lâm M T (Vietnam) Lê N V	16	9

==== Section 4 ====
First round
(Indonesia) D B Anjani (Indonesia) F Iwasaki	22	21
(Vietnam) Đinh T P H (Vietnam) Phạm T K	20	12

Second round
(Indonesia) D B Anjani (Indonesia) F Iwasaki	w	/	o
8	(India) S Ghorpade (India) P Konjengbam
(India) D Jagadish (India) S P. Krishnapriya	8	5
2	(Indonesia) F D Kusuma (Indonesia) A C Pratiwi	21	21

Quarter-finals
(Indonesia) D B Anjani (Indonesia) F Iwasaki	12	14
2	(Indonesia) F D Kusuma (Indonesia) A C Pratiwi	21	21

== Mixed doubles ==
=== Seeds ===
1. (Indonesia) Rehan Naufal Kusharjanto / Lisa Ayu Kusumawati (Final)
2. (Indonesia) Zachariah Josiahno Sumanti / Hediana Julimarbela (Semi-finals)
3. (Malaysia) Chan Peng Soon / Cheah Yee See (Quarter-finals)
4. (Indonesia) Dejan Ferdinansyah / Gloria Emanuelle Widjaja (Champions)
5. (Indonesia) Muhammad Reza Pahlevi Isfahani / Melati Daeva Oktavianti (Quarter-finals)
6. (Malaysia) Low Juan Shen / Goh Liu Ying (Quarter-finals)
7. (Hong Kong) Chang Tak Ching / Lui Lok Lok (Quarter-finals)
8. (Hong Kong) Yeung Shing Choi / Fan Ka Yan (Second round)

=== Finals ===
Semi-finals
1	(Indonesia) Rehan Naufal Kusharjanto (Indonesia) Lisa Ayu Kusumawati	21	21
(India) Rohan Kapoor (India) N. Sikki Reddy	16	14
4	(Indonesia) Dejan Ferdinansyah (Indonesia) Gloria Emanuelle Widjaja	21	21
2	(Indonesia) Zachariah Josiahno Sumanti (Indonesia) Hediana Julimarbela	17	13

Final
1	(Indonesia) Rehan Naufal Kusharjanto (Indonesia) Lisa Ayu Kusumawati	13	18
4	(Indonesia) Dejan Ferdinansyah (Indonesia) Gloria Emanuelle Widjaja	21	21

=== Top half ===
==== Section 1 ====
First round
(Vietnam) Trần L M A (Vietnam) Nguyễn H T K	21	16	17
(Thailand) W Phakjarung (Thailand) S Chueboca	16	21	21
(India) M S Khwairakpam (India) S Singhi
(India) M Kathiravan (India) K Balashri	w	/	o

Second round
1	(Indonesia) R N Kusharjanto (Indonesia) L A Kusumawati	21	21
(Thailand) W Phakjarung (Thailand) S Chueboca	17	9
5	(Indonesia) M R P Isfahani (Indonesia) M D Oktavianti	21	21
(India) M Kathiravan (India) K Balashri	17	8

Quarter-finals
1	(Indonesia) R N Kusharjanto (Indonesia) L A Kusumawati	23	21
5	(Indonesia) M R P Isfahani (Indonesia) M D Oktavianti	21	7

==== Section 2 ====
First round
(India) S Haribaskaran (India) K Ganesan	13	15
(Malaysia) Tan M K (Indonesia) S Kani	21	21
8	(Hong Kong) Yeung S C (Hong Kong) Fan K Y	21	23
(Hong Kong) Law C H (Hong Kong) Leung S L	17	21
(India) H Amsakarunan (India) S. S. L P Subramanian	21	9	12
(India) R Kapoor (India) N. S Reddy	14	21	21

Second round
3	(Malaysia) Chan P S (Malaysia) Cheah Y S	21	21
(Malaysia) Tan M K (Indonesia) S Kani	17	17
8	(Hong Kong) Yeung S C (Hong Kong) Fan K Y	10	21	18
(India) R Kapoor (India) N. S Reddy	21	19	21

Quarter-finals
3	(Malaysia) Chan P S (Malaysia) Cheah Y S	19	17
(India) R Kapoor (India) N. S Reddy	21	21

=== Bottom half ===
==== Section 3 ====
First round
(Vietnam) Trần Đ M (Vietnam) Đinh T P H	21	21
(India) S Gajendran (India) D Jagadish	13	17
(Hong Kong) Hung K C (Hong Kong) Ng W Y	12	14
7	(Hong Kong) Chang T C (Hong Kong) Lui L L	21	21
(Malaysia) Ling W J (Malaysia) Tang W X	14	12
(Singapore) A Kwek (Singapore) C Wong	21	21

Second round
(Vietnam) Trần Đ M (Vietnam) Đinh T P H	20	12
7	(Hong Kong) Chang T C (Hong Kong) Lui L L	22	21
(Singapore) A Kwek (Singapore) C Wong	10	21	16
4	(Indonesia) D Ferdinansyah (Indonesia) G E Widjaja	21	18	21

Quarter-finals
7	(Hong Kong) Chang T C (Hong Kong) Lui L L	18	5
4	(Indonesia) D Ferdinansyah (Indonesia) G E Widjaja	21	21

==== Section 4 ====
First round
(Vietnam) Nguyễn Ả G H (Vietnam) Lâm M T	21	15	21
(Thailand) W Surakkhaka (Thailand) K Dubthuk	17	21	16
(Vietnam) Phạm V H (Vietnam) Thân V A	21	14
6	(Malaysia) Low J S (Malaysia) Goh L Y	23	21
(India) B Navaneeth (India) P Konjengbam	21	22
(Vietnam) Nguyễn Đ H (Vietnam) Phạm T K	14	20

Second round
(Vietnam) Nguyễn Ả G H (Vietnam) Lâm M T	16	17
6	(Malaysia) Low J S (Malaysia) Goh L Y	21	21
(India) B Navaneeth (India) P Konjengbam	14	11
2	(Indonesia) Z J Sumanti (Indonesia) H Julimarbela	21	21

Quarter-finals
6	(Malaysia) Low J S (Malaysia) Goh L Y	18	9
2	(Indonesia) Z J Sumanti (Indonesia) H Julimarbela	21	21

Preceded by 2019 Vietnam Open	Vietnam Open	Succeeded by 2023 Vietnam Open
Preceded by 2022 Japan Open	BWF World Tour; 2022 BWF season	Succeeded by 2022 Canada Open
