= Chaloempon Charoenkitamorn =

Thai badminton player (born 1997)

Personal information
- Nickname: Oat
- Born: 15 April 1997 (age 29) Bangkok, Thailand
- Height: 1.7 m (5 ft 7 in)

Sport
- Country: Thailand
- Sport: Badminton
- Handedness: Right

Men's & mixed doubles
- Highest ranking: 34 (MD with Nanthakarn Yordphaisong, 14 March 2023); 89 (XD with Chasinee Korepap, 17 March 2020)
- Current ranking: 41 (MD with Worrapol Thongsa-nga, 27 October 2026)
- BWF profile
Medal record
Men's badminton
Representing Thailand
Asian Games
Bronze medal – third place	2026 Aichi–Nagoya	Men's team
Asia Mixed Team Championships
Bronze medal – third place	2025 Qingdao	Mixed team
SEA Games
Gold medal – first place	2021 Vietnam	Men's team
Bronze medal – third place	2023 Cambodia	Men's team

Chaloempon Charoenkitamorn (Thai: เฉลิมพล เจริญกิจอมร; born 15 April 1997) is a Thai badminton player.

== Achievements ==
=== BWF World Tour (1 title) ===
The BWF World Tour, which was announced on 19 March 2017 and implemented in 2018, is a series of elite badminton tournaments sanctioned by the Badminton World Federation (BWF). The BWF World Tours are divided into levels of World Tour Finals, Super 1000, Super 750, Super 500, Super 300, and the BWF Tour Super 100.

Men's doubles
Year	Tournament	Level	Partner	Opponent	Score	Result	Ref.
2024 (I)	Indonesia Masters	Super 100	(Thailand) Worrapol Thongsa-nga	(Indonesia) Rahmat Hidayat (Indonesia) Yeremia Rambitan	21–19, 21–15	(gold) Winner	

=== BWF International Challenge/Series (4 titles, 5 runners-up) ===
Men's doubles
Year	Tournament	Partner	Opponent	Score	Result
2019	India International	(Thailand) Kittisak Namdash	(India) Manu Attri (India) B. Sumeeth Reddy	15–21, 15–21	(silver) Runner-up
2022	Nantes International	(Thailand) Nanthakarn Yordphaisong	(Chinese Taipei) Su Ching-heng (Chinese Taipei) Ye Hong-wei	21–19, 17–21, 16–21	(silver) Runner-up
2022 (I)	India International	(Thailand) Nanthakarn Yordphaisong	(India) Arjun M. R. (India) Dhruv Kapila	17–21, 22–20, 18–21	(silver) Runner-up
2022 (III)	India International	(Thailand) Nanthakarn Yordphaisong	(Thailand) Tanadon Punpanich (Thailand) Wachirawit Sothon	21–11, 21–14	(gold) Winner
2022	Maldives International	(Thailand) Nanthakarn Yordphaisong	(India) Rohan Kapoor (India) B. Sumeeth Reddy	23–21, 19–21, 17–21	(silver) Runner-up
2022	Bahrain International	(Thailand) Nanthakarn Yordphaisong	(Indonesia) Rayhan Fadillah (Indonesia) Rahmat Hidayat	13–21, 17–21	(silver) Runner-up
2023	Thailand International	(Thailand) Nanthakarn Yordphaisong	(Malaysia) Choong Hon Jian (Malaysia) Goh Sze Fei	15–21, 21–15, 24–22	(gold) Winner
2023 (II)	India International	(Thailand) Thanawin Madee	(Thailand) Sirawit Sothon (Thailand) Natthapat Trinkajee	21–17, 21–17	(gold) Winner

Mixed doubles
Year	Tournament	Partner	Opponent	Score	Result
2019	Maldives International	(Thailand) Chasinee Korepap	(India) Saipratheek K. Krishnaprasad (India) K. Ashwini Bhat	21–11, 21–15	(gold) Winner

BWF International Challenge tournament
BWF International Series tournament
