= Valeree Siow =

Malaysian badminton player

Valeree Siow 萧紫萱
Personal information
- Born: 18 March 2002 (age 24) Perak, Malaysia
- Height: 1.60 m (5 ft 3 in)

Sport
- Country: Malaysia
- Sport: Badminton
- Handedness: Right

Women's & mixed doubles
- Highest ranking: 37 (WD with Low Yeen Yuan, 17 January 2023); 43 (XD with Yap Roy King, 30 July 2024)
- Current ranking: 149 (XD with Yap Roy King, 23 September 2025)
- BWF profile
Medal record
Women's badminton
Representing Malaysia
Sudirman Cup
Bronze medal – third place	2023 Suzhou	Mixed team
Asia Team Championships
Bronze medal – third place	2022 Selangor	Women's team

Valeree Siow Zi Xuan (Chinese: 蕭紫萱; pinyin: Xiāo Zǐxuān; born 18 March 2002) is a Malaysian badminton player who specialises in the women's doubles and mixed doubles events.

== Career ==
=== 2021 ===
2021 was a fruitful year for Siow. She clinched three titles in women's doubles with her partner Low Yeen Yuan at the Slovenia International, Latvia International and Hellas International. She also cliched three titles in mixed doubles with Yap Roy King at the Latvia International, Hellas International and Ukraine International. She was named as Chan Peng Soon's new mixed doubles partner after Chan split up for good with Goh Liu Ying and rejoined the Badminton Association of Malaysia.

=== 2022 ===
Siow's debut tournament with Chan was at the India Open 2022 in New Delhi. They were eliminated by 2nd seeds Rodion Alimov and Alina Davletova of Russia in the quarterfinals with a score of 14–21, 13–21. She was part of Malaysia's women's team that won bronze at the 2022 Badminton Asia Team Championships in February. In June, she had a partnership stint with Chen Tang Jie in mixed doubles where they competed at the BWF World Tour events in Indonesia, Malaysia and Singapore. In August, she made her debut at the 2022 BWF World Championships.

=== 2023 ===
In May, Siow made her debut at the 2023 SEA Games in the women's team event. She was also part of Malaysia's squad at the 2023 Sudirman Cup that won bronze. In July, Siow was crowned as mixed doubles national champion after winning the 2023 Malaysian National Badminton Championships with Yap Roy King. In August, she and partner Go Pei Kee finished as runner-ups with at the Maldives International. In September, Siow and Yap entered their first BWF World Tour final at the Indonesia Masters. They successfully captured the mixed doubles title after defeating Japan's Hiroki Nishi and Akari Sato in three games.

== Personal life ==
Siow's sister Desiree Siow Hao Shan is also a badminton player specialising in the women's and mixed doubles events. She is currently pursuing a bachelor's degree in Sports Science at the University of Malaya.

== Achievements ==
=== BWF World Tour (1 title) ===
The BWF World Tour, which was announced on 19 March 2017 and implemented in 2018, is a series of elite badminton tournaments sanctioned by the Badminton World Federation (BWF). The BWF World Tours are divided into levels of World Tour Finals, Super 1000, Super 750, Super 500, Super 300, and the BWF Tour Super 100.

Mixed doubles
Year	Tournament	Level	Partner	Opponent	Score	Result	Ref.
2023 (I)	Indonesia Masters	Super 100	(Malaysia) Yap Roy King	(Japan) Hiroki Nishi (Japan) Akari Sato	13–21, 21–14, 21–14	(gold) Winner	

=== BWF International Challenge/Series (6 titles, 1 runner-up) ===
Women's doubles
Year	Tournament	Partner	Opponent	Score	Result
2021	Slovenia International	(Malaysia) Low Yeen Yuan	(Denmark) Isabella Nielsen (Denmark) Marie Louise Steffensen	21–11, 21–15	(gold) Winner
2021	Latvia International	(Malaysia) Low Yeen Yuan	(Italy) Martini Corsini (Italy) Judith Mair	21–7, 21–17	(gold) Winner
2021	Hellas International	(Malaysia) Low Yeen Yuan	(Italy) Katharina Fink (Italy) Yasmine Hamza	21–15, 21–16	(gold) Winner
2023	Maldives International	(Malaysia) Go Pei Kee	(Malaysia) Ho Lo Ee (Malaysia) Amanda Yap	18–21, 21–9, 18–21	(silver) Runner-up

Mixed doubles
Year	Tournament	Partner	Opponent	Score	Result
2021	Latvia International	(Malaysia) Yap Roy King	(Malaysia) Muhammad Nurfirdaus Azman (Malaysia) Low Yeen Yuan	22–20, 21–15	(gold) Winner
2021	Hellas International	(Malaysia) Yap Roy King	(Norway) Carl Christian Mork (Norway) Solvår Flåten Jørgensen	21–13, 21–17	(gold) Winner
2021	Ukraine International	(Malaysia) Yap Roy King	(Germany) Johhannes Pistorius (Germany) Emma Moszczynski	21–19, 21–12	(gold) Winner

BWF International Challenge tournament
BWF International Series tournament
BWF Future Series tournament
