= Badminton at the 2023 SEA Games – Individual event =

Tournament details
- Dates: 12–16 May 2023
- Venue: Morodok Techo Badminton Hall
- Location: Phnom Penh, Cambodia

Champions
- Men's singles: (Indonesia) Christian Adinata
- Women's singles: (Thailand) Supanida Katethong
- Men's doubles: (Indonesia) Pramudya Kusumawardana (Indonesia) Yeremia Rambitan
- Women's doubles: (Indonesia) Febriana Dwipuji Kusuma (Indonesia) Amalia Cahaya Pratiwi
- Mixed doubles: (Indonesia) Rehan Naufal Kusharjanto (Indonesia) Lisa Ayu Kusumawati

The individual events for badminton at the 2023 SEA Games was held from 12 to 16 May 2023 at the Morodok Techo Badminton Hall, Phnom Penh, Cambodia. It was contesting five events: the men's singles, women's singles, men's doubles, women's doubles and mixed doubles.

== Men's singles ==
=== Seeds ===
1. (Indonesia) Chico Aura Dwi Wardoyo (silver medalist)
2. (Indonesia) Christian Adinata (gold medalist)
3. (Malaysia) Leong Jun Hao (bronze medalist)
4. (Malaysia) Lee Shun Yang (bronze medalist)

=== Draw ===
==== Finals ====
Semi-final
1	(Indonesia) Chico Aura Dwi Wardoyo	21	21
4	(Malaysia) Lee Shun Yang	15	18
3	(Malaysia) Leong Jun Hao	19	12
2	(Indonesia) Christian Adinata	21	21

Final
1	(Indonesia) Chico Aura Dwi Wardoyo	12	21	18
2	(Indonesia) Christian Adinata	21	18	21

==== Top half ====
First round
(Singapore) Marcus Lau	21	21
(Timor-Leste) Zidane Gusmão	2	8

Second round
1	(Indonesia) Chico Aura Dwi Wardoyo	21	21
(Philippines) Mark Velasco	10	12
(Vietnam) Lê Đức Phát	21	21
(Cambodia) Vannthoun Vath	10	7
4	(Malaysia) Lee Shun Yang	21	23
(Myanmar) Hein Htut	9	21
(Thailand) Panitchaphon Teeraratsakul	21	21
(Singapore) Marcus Lau	9	12

Quarter-final
1	(Indonesia) Chico Aura Dwi Wardoyo	21	21
(Vietnam) Lê Đức Phát	6	18
4	(Malaysia) Lee Shun Yang	18	21	21
(Thailand) Panitchaphon Teeraratsakul	21	19	17

Semi-final
1	(Indonesia) Chico Aura Dwi Wardoyo	21	21
4	(Malaysia) Lee Shun Yang	15	18

=== Bottom half ===
First round
(Cambodia) Sok Rikreay	18	8
(Philippines) Jewel Albo	21	21

Second round
(Philippines) Jewel Albo	21	21
(Myanmar) Zaw Lin Htoo	13	15
(Singapore) Joel Koh	21	14
3	(Malaysia) Leong Jun Hao	23	21
(Vietnam) Nguyễn Hải Đăng	21	21
(Timor-Leste) Mourinho Gusmão	8	6
(Thailand) Saran Jamsri	16	18
2	(Indonesia) Christian Adinata	21	21

Quarter-final
(Philippines) Jewel Albo	14	21
3	(Malaysia) Leong Jun Hao	21	23
(Vietnam) Nguyễn Hải Đăng	11	14
2	(Indonesia) Christian Adinata	21	21

Semi-final
3	(Malaysia) Leong Jun Hao	19	12
2	(Indonesia) Christian Adinata	21	21

== Women's singles ==
=== Seeds ===
1. (Thailand) Lalinrat Chaiwan (silver medalist)
2. (Thailand) Supanida Katethong (gold medalist)
3. (Vietnam) Nguyễn Thùy Linh (quarter-final)
4. (Indonesia) Komang Ayu Cahya Dewi (bronze medalist)

=== Draw ===
First round
1	(Thailand) Lalinrat Chaiwan	21	21
(Malaysia) Wong Ling Ching	9	16
(Philippines) Bianca Carlos	3	16
(Vietnam) Vũ Thị Trang	21	21
4	(Indonesia) Komang Ayu Cahya Dewi	21	21
(Cambodia) Phon Chenda	3	5
(Timor-Leste) Zoraida Gusmão	3	7
(Singapore) Megan Lee	21	21
(Indonesia) Ester Nurumi Tri Wardoyo	21	21
(Malaysia) Ong Xin Yee	15	18
(Myanmar) Thet Htar Thuzar	13	17
3	(Vietnam) Nguyễn Thùy Linh	21	21
(Cambodia) Heang Leakhena	5	1
(Singapore) Insyirah Khan	21	21
(Philippines) Mikaela de Guzman	8	9
2	(Thailand) Supanida Katethong	21	21

Quarter-final
1	(Thailand) Lalinrat Chaiwan	21	21
(Vietnam) Vũ Thị Trang	18	17
4	(Indonesia) Komang Ayu Cahya Dewi	21	21
(Singapore) Megan Lee	10	9
(Indonesia) Ester Nurumi Tri Wardoyo	21	14	21
3	(Vietnam) Nguyễn Thùy Linh	8	21	17
(Singapore) Insyirah Khan	13	17
2	(Thailand) Supanida Katethong	21	21

Semi-final
1	(Thailand) Lalinrat Chaiwan	21	21
4	(Indonesia) Komang Ayu Cahya Dewi	14	18
(Indonesia) Ester Nurumi Tri Wardoyo	11	10
2	(Thailand) Supanida Katethong	21	21

Final
1	(Thailand) Lalinrat Chaiwan	12	14
2	(Thailand) Supanida Katethong	21	21

== Men's doubles ==
=== Seeds ===
1. (Indonesia) Muhammad Shohibul Fikri / Bagas Maulana (bronze medalists)
2. (Indonesia) Pramudya Kusumawardana / Yeremia Rambitan (gold medalists)

=== Draw ===
First round
(Philippines) Christian Bernardo (Philippines) Alvin Morada	18	21	21
(Vietnam) Nguyễn Xuân Hưng (Vietnam) Phạm Văn Hải	21	18	15
(Malaysia) Beh Chun Meng (Malaysia) Goh Boon Zhe	21	21
(Cambodia) Sorn Liza (Cambodia) Sophanith Reach	3	11
(Thailand) Peeratchai Sukphun (Thailand) Pakkapon Teeraratsakul	21	21
(Timor-Leste) Mourinho Gusmão (Timor-Leste) Zidane Gusmão	4	4
(Singapore) Nge Joo Jie (Singapore) Johann Prajogo	21	21
(Cambodia) Heng Mengleap (Cambodia) Yam Samnang	10	11
(Malaysia) Chia Wei Jie (Malaysia) Liew Xun	19	21	21
(Vietnam) Nguyễn Đinh Hoàng (Vietnam) Trần Đình Mạnh	21	12	18
(Thailand) Ruttanapak Oupthong (Thailand) Nanthakarn Yordphaisong	21	17	21
(Philippines) Solomon Padiz Jr. (Philippines) Julius Villabrille	11	21	13

Quarter-final
1	(Indonesia) Muhammad Shohibul Fikri (Indonesia) Bagas Maulana	21	21
(Philippines) Christian Bernardo (Philippines) Alvin Morada	18	15
(Malaysia) Beh Chun Meng (Malaysia) Goh Boon Zhe	16	18
(Thailand) Peeratchai Sukphun (Thailand) Pakkapon Teeraratsakul	21	21
(Singapore) Nge Joo Jie (Singapore) Johann Prajogo	21	21
(Malaysia) Chia Wei Jie (Malaysia) Liew Xun	19	18
(Thailand) Ruttanapak Oupthong (Thailand) Nanthakarn Yordphaisong	14	21	15
2	(Indonesia) Pramudya Kusumawardana (Indonesia) Yeremia Rambitan	21	11	21

Semi-final
1	(Indonesia) Muhammad Shohibul Fikri (Indonesia) Bagas Maulana	12	19
(Thailand) Peeratchai Sukphun (Thailand) Pakkapon Teeraratsakul	21	21
(Singapore) Nge Joo Jie (Singapore) Johann Prajogo	16	18
2	(Indonesia) Pramudya Kusumawardana (Indonesia) Yeremia Rambitan	21	21

Final
(Thailand) Peeratchai Sukphun (Thailand) Pakkapon Teeraratsakul	17	19
2	(Indonesia) Pramudya Kusumawardana (Indonesia) Yeremia Rambitan	21	21

== Women's doubles ==
=== Seeds ===
1. (Indonesia) Febriana Dwipuji Kusuma / Amalia Cahaya Pratiwi (gold medalists)
2. (Indonesia) Meilysa Trias Puspita Sari / Rachel Allessya Rose (silver medalists)

=== Draw ===
First round
(Cambodia) Bun Srey Hong (Cambodia) Kimloung Lim	5	9
(Philippines) Nicole Albo (Philippines) Thea Pomar	21	21
(Malaysia) Lee Xin Jie (Malaysia) Low Yeen Yuan	21	21
(Vietnam) Thân Vân Anh (Vietnam) Vũ Thị Anh Thư	17	13
(Singapore) Heng Xiao En (Singapore) Elsa Lai	17	21	21
(Cambodia) Chheng Huy (Cambodia) Seavty Teav	21	19	8
(Vietnam) Đinh Thị Phương Hồng (Vietnam) Phạm Thị Khánh	19	15
(Malaysia) Cheng Su Hui (Malaysia) Cheng Su Yin	21	21
(Philippines) Alyssa Leonardo (Philippines) Susmita Ramos	15	10
(Thailand) Laksika Kanlaha (Thailand) Phataimas Muenwong	21	21

Quarter-final
1	(Indonesia) Febriana Dwipuji Kusuma (Indonesia) Amalia Cahaya Pratiwi	21	21
(Philippines) Nicole Albo (Philippines) Thea Pomar	19	18
(Thailand) Chasinee Korepap (Thailand) Pitchamon Opatniputh	21	19	19
(Malaysia) Lee Xin Jie (Malaysia) Low Yeen Yuan	13	21	21
(Singapore) Heng Xiao En (Singapore) Elsa Lai	12	11
(Malaysia) Cheng Su Hui (Malaysia) Cheng Su Yin	21	21
(Thailand) Laksika Kanlaha (Thailand) Phataimas Muenwong	21	16	16
2	(Indonesia) Meilysa Trias Puspita Sari (Indonesia) Rachel Allessya Rose	18	21	21

Semi-final
1	(Indonesia) Febriana Dwipuji Kusuma (Indonesia) Amalia Cahaya Pratiwi	21	21
(Malaysia) Lee Xin Jie (Malaysia) Low Yeen Yuan	9	9
(Malaysia) Cheng Su Hui (Malaysia) Cheng Su Yin	10	17
2	(Indonesia) Meilysa Trias Puspita Sari (Indonesia) Rachel Allessya Rose	21	21

Final
1	(Indonesia) Febriana Dwipuji Kusuma (Indonesia) Amalia Cahaya Pratiwi	21	21
2	(Indonesia) Meilysa Trias Puspita Sari (Indonesia) Rachel Allessya Rose	17	16

== Mixed doubles ==
=== Seeds ===
1. (Indonesia) Rehan Naufal Kusharjanto / Lisa Ayu Kusumawati (gold medalists)
2. (Indonesia) Zachariah Josiahno Sumanti / Hediana Julimarbela (first round)

=== Draw ===
First round
(Philippines) Solomon Padiz Jr. (Philippines) Eleanor Inlayo	21	21
(Singapore) Johann Prajogo (Singapore) Elsa Lai	12	8
(Thailand) Ratchapol Makkasasithorn (Thailand) Chasinee Korepap	21	21
(Vietnam) Trần Đình Mạnh (Vietnam) Đinh Thị Phương Hồng	18	19
(Malaysia) Choong Hon Jian (Malaysia) Yap Ling	21	21
(Cambodia) Heng Mengleap (Cambodia) Bun Srey Hong	9	8
(Timor-Leste) Zidane Gusmão (Timor-Leste) Zoraida Gusmão	6	8
(Cambodia) Vannthoun Vath (Cambodia) Kimloung Lim	21	21
(Malaysia) Yap Roy King (Malaysia) Cheng Su Yin	21	21
(Singapore) Donovan Willard Wee (Singapore) Heng Xiao En	14	17
(Philippines) Alvin Morada (Philippines) Alyssa Leonardo	21	21
(Vietnam) Phạm Văn Hải (Vietnam) Thân Vân Anh	15	16
(Thailand) Pakkapon Teeraratsakul (Thailand) Phataimas Muenwong	11	24	22
2	(Indonesia) Zachariah Josiahno Sumanti (Indonesia) Hediana Julimarbela	21	22	20

Quarter-final
1	(Indonesia) Rehan Naufal Kusharjanto (Indonesia) Lisa Ayu Kusumawati	24	21
(Philippines) Solomon Padiz Jr. (Philippines) Eleanor Inlayo	22	10
(Thailand) Ratchapol Makkasasithorn (Thailand) Chasinee Korepap	21	21
(Malaysia) Choong Hon Jian (Malaysia) Yap Ling	14	18
(Cambodia) Vannthoun Vath (Cambodia) Kimloung Lim	5	3
(Malaysia) Yap Roy King (Malaysia) Cheng Su Yin	21	21
(Philippines) Alvin Morada (Philippines) Alyssa Leonardo	11	14
(Thailand) Pakkapon Teeraratsakul (Thailand) Phataimas Muenwong	21	21

Semi-final
1	(Indonesia) Rehan Naufal Kusharjanto (Indonesia) Lisa Ayu Kusumawati	19	21	21
(Thailand) Ratchapol Makkasasithorn (Thailand) Chasinee Korepap	21	18	19
(Malaysia) Yap Roy King (Malaysia) Cheng Su Yin	24	25	21
(Thailand) Pakkapon Teeraratsakul (Thailand) Phataimas Muenwong	22	27	19

Final
1	(Indonesia) Rehan Naufal Kusharjanto (Indonesia) Lisa Ayu Kusumawati	20	21	21
(Malaysia) Yap Roy King (Malaysia) Cheng Su Yin	22	8	16

== See also ==
- Men's team tournament
- Women's team tournament
- Mixed team tournament
