= Zachariah Josiahno Sumanti =

Indonesian badminton player (born 1997)

Personal information
- Born: 24 September 1997 (age 29) Tondano, North Sulawesi, Indonesia
- Height: 1.81 m (5 ft 11 in)

Sport
- Country: Indonesia
- Sport: Badminton
- Handedness: Right

Mixed doubles
- Highest ranking: 28 (with Hediana Julimarbela, 7 February 2023)
- BWF profile
Medal record
Men's badminton
Representing Indonesia
Southeast Asian Games
Gold medal – first place	2023 Cambodia	Men's team

Zachariah Josiahno Sumanti (born 24 September 1997) is an Indonesian badminton player.

== Career ==
In 2018, Sumanti reached the quarter-finals of the 2018 Bangka Belitung Indonesia Masters partnering with Angelica Wiratama.

In 2019, Sumanti won the mixed doubles title at the Indonesia International partnering with Hediana Julimarbela.

In 2021, Sumanti and Julimarbela lost in the semi-finals of the Orléans Masters.

In 2022, Sumanti and Julimarbela won their second title in the Italian International. In August, they played in the World Championships but lost in the second round from 15th seeds Robin Tabeling and Selena Piek from the Netherlands. In September, they reached the Vietnam Open semifinals, but lost to fellow Indonesian pair Dejan Ferdinansyah and Gloria Emanuelle Widjaja. Played at the Denmark Open in October, he and his partner were defeated in the first round to top seeds Dechapol Puavaranukroh and Sapsiree Taerattanachai.

=== 2023 ===
Sumanti with his partner Julimarbela started the 2023 season with unsatisfactory results, where they lost in the early rounds of Asian Tour in the tournament Malaysia Open, India Open, and Indonesia Masters. The duo then reached the quarter-finals in the Thailand Masters, but was beaten by Korean pair Kim Won-ho and Jeong Na-eun. The poor performance of Sumanti and Julimarbela then continued on to the Europe tour, where they were not able to go far, losing in the second round in the All England Open, and first round at the Swiss Open, Spain Masters, and the Orléans Masters.

In May, Sumanti competed at the 2023 SEA Games in Cambodia. He became a member of the Indonesia men's team that won the gold medal. In the individual mixed doubles event, Sumanti who carried the second seed status with his partner Julimarbela, was eliminated in the first round from Thai pair Pakkapon Teeraratsakul and Phataimas Muenwong. Sumanti and Julimarbela continued with unsatisfactory results, where they lost in the first rounds of second Asian Tour in the tournament Malaysia Masters, and Thailand Open.

In June, Sumanti and Julimarbela competed at the home tournament, Indonesia Open, but lost in the first round from 3rd seed Thai player Dechapol Puavaranukroh and Sapsiree Taerattanachai.

In September, Sumanti and Julimarbela as the 1st seed lost at the first round of Indonesia Masters Super 100 I from Thai pair Pakkapon Teeraratsakul and Phataimas Muenwong.

== Achievements ==
=== BWF International Challenge/Series (2 titles) ===
Mixed doubles
Year	Tournament	Partner	Opponent	Score	Result	Ref.
2019	Indonesia International	(Indonesia) Hediana Julimarbela	(Indonesia) Rian Agung Saputro (Indonesia) Tiara Rosalia Nuraidah	22–20, 21–14	(gold) Winner	
2022	Italian International	(Indonesia) Hediana Julimarbela	(Thailand) Ruttanapak Oupthong (Thailand) Chasinee Korepap	22–20, 21–9	(gold) Winner	

BWF International Challenge tournament
BWF International Series tournament
BWF Future Series tournament

== Performance timeline ==
Key

W	Won	F	Finalist	SF	Semi-finalist
QF	Quarter-finalist	#R	Rounds 4, 3, 2, 1	RR	Round-robin stage
Q#	Qualification round	A	Absent	w/d	Withdrew
G	Gold	S	Silver	B	Bronze
NH	Not held	N/A	Not applicable	DNQ	Did not qualify

=== National team ===
- Senior level

Team events	2023	Ref
SEA Games	G	

=== Individual competitions ===
==== Senior level ====
===== Men's doubles =====
Tournament	SS / GP	Best
Tournament	2017	Best
Singapore Open	Q1	Q1 ('17)
Year-end ranking	1,247	1,094

===== Mixed doubles =====
Events	2022	2023	Ref
SEA Games	NH	1R	
World Championships	2R	DNQ	

Tournament	SS / GP	BWF World Tour								Best	Ref
Tournament	2017	2018	2019	2020	2021	2022	2023	2024	2025	Best	Ref
Malaysia Open	A			NH		A	1R	A		1R ('23)	
India Open	A			NH		A	1R	A		1R ('23)	
Indonesia Masters	NH	A			2R	A	1R	A		2R ('21)	
Thailand Masters	A				NH		QF	A		QF ('23)	
Orléans Masters	N/A	A		NH	SF	2R	1R	A		SF ('21)	
All England Open	A						2R	A		2R ('23)	
Lingshui China Masters	NA	A	1R	NH			A			1R ('19)	
Swiss Open	A			NH	A		1R	A		1R ('23)	
Spain Masters	NH	A			2R	NH	1R	A	NH	2R ('21)	
Taipei Open	A			NH		w/d	A			—	
Thailand Open	A				NH	2R	1R	A		2R ('22)	
Malaysia Masters	A				NH	1R	1R	A		1R ('22, '23)	
Singapore Open	Q2	A		NH		1R	A			1R ('22)	
Indonesia Open	A			NH	1R	A	1R	A		1R ('21, '23)	
Canada Open	A			NH		A			2R	2R ('25)	
Vietnam Open	A		1R	NH		SF	A			SF ('22)	
Indonesia Masters Super 100	NH	QF	1R	NH		A	1R	A		QF ('18)	
Indonesia Masters Super 100	NH	QF	1R	NH		A	2R	A		QF ('18)	
Denmark Open	A					1R	A			1R ('22)	
French Open	A			NH	A	2R	A			2R ('22)	
Hylo Open	A					1R	A			1R ('22)	
Hyderabad Open	NH	2R	A	NH						2R ('18)	
Year-end ranking	683	127	205	187	81	34	52	452		28	
Tournament	2017	2018	2019	2020	2021	2022	2023	2024	2025	Best	Ref
