= Ester Nurumi Tri Wardoyo =

Indonesian badminton player (born 2004)

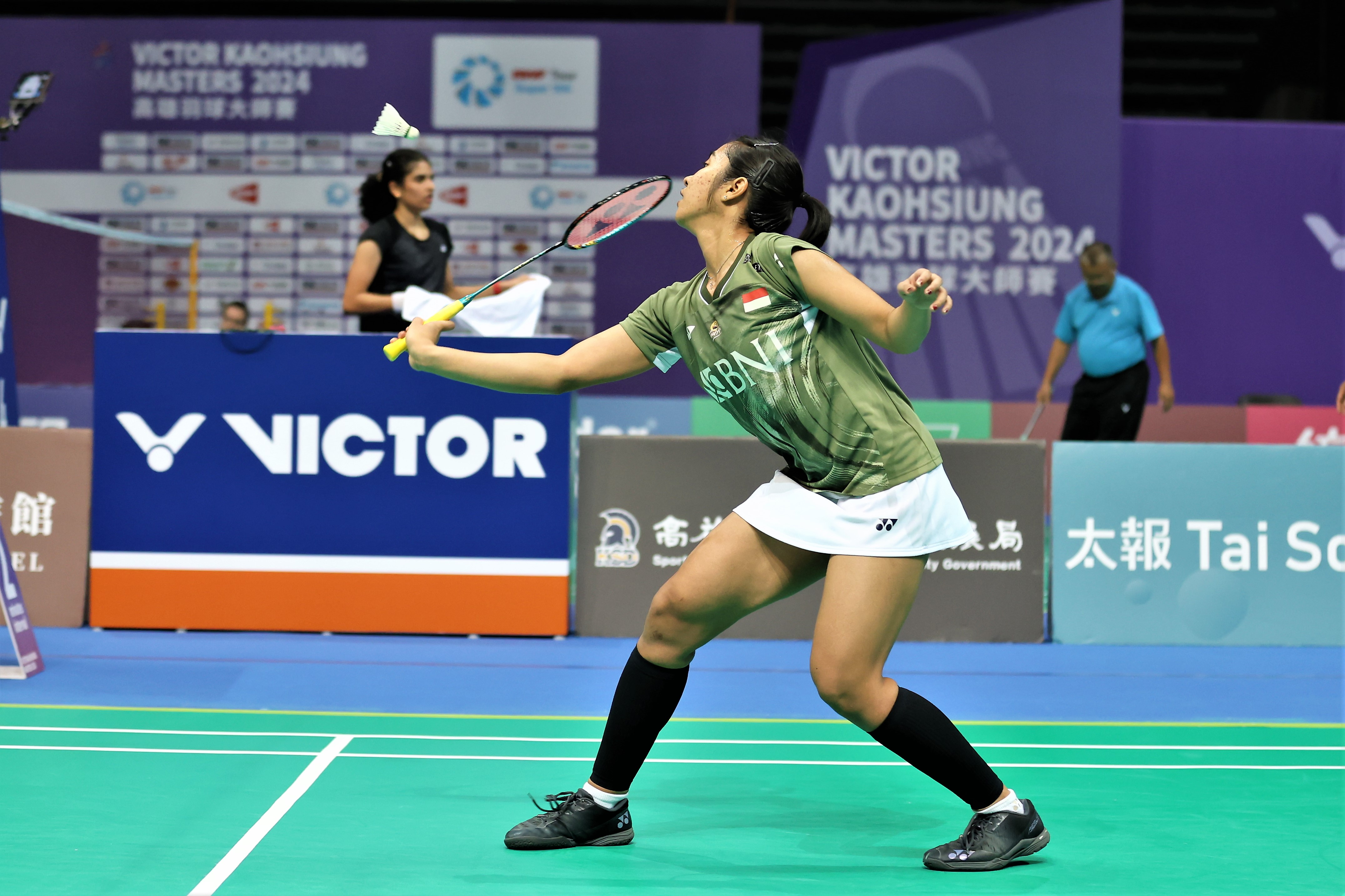

Personal information
- Born: 26 August 2004 (age 22) Jayapura, Papua, Indonesia

Sport
- Country: Indonesia
- Sport: Badminton
- Handedness: Right

Women's singles
- Career record: 110 wins, 50 losses
- Highest ranking: 22 (9 July 2024)
- BWF profile
Medal record
Women's badminton
Representing Indonesia
Sudirman Cup
Bronze medal – third place	2025 Xiamen	Mixed team
Uber Cup
Silver medal – second place	2024 Chengdu	Women's team
Bronze medal – third place	2026 Horsens	Women's team
Asia Team Championships
Bronze medal – third place	2024 Selangor	Women's team
Bronze medal – third place	2026 Qingdao	Women's team
SEA Games
Silver medal – second place	2023 Cambodia	Women's team
Bronze medal – third place	2023 Cambodia	Women's singles
World Junior Championships
Bronze medal – third place	2022 Santander	Girls' singles
Bronze medal – third place	2022 Santander	Mixed team

Ester Nurumi Tri Wardoyo (born 26 August 2004) is an Indonesian badminton player. She was the bronze medalists in the 2022 World Junior Championships and 2023 SEA Games. Wardoyo was ranked 1st in junior rankings for the girls' singles on 29 November 2022.

== Personal life ==
She is the younger sibling of an Indonesian badminton athlete, Chico Aura Dwi Wardoyo.

== Career ==
=== 2023 ===
In April, Wardoyo competed for the first time in BWF Tour at the Orléans Masters in France, but had to lose in the second round from Singaporean player Yeo Jia Min.

=== 2024 ===
She was selected as a member of the Indonesian women's team at the Asia Team Championships in February, and the Uber Cup in May, where the team won a bronze medal at the Asian Championships, and then made history by reaching the final at the Uber Cup since 2008. In the final Indonesia lost to China 0–3. In June, she reached the finals in the Australian Open, but had to accept defeat to Aya Ohori.

== Achievements ==
=== SEA Games ===
Women's singles
Year	Venue	Opponent	Score	Result	Ref.
2023	Morodok Techo Badminton Hall; Phnom Penh, Cambodia	(Thailand) Supanida Katethong	10–21, 11–21	Bronze	

=== BWF World Junior Championships ===
Girls' singles
Year	Venue	Opponent	Score	Result	Ref.
2022	Palacio de Deportes de Santander; Santander, Spain	(China) Yuan Anqi	21–17, 15–21, 11–21	Bronze	

=== BWF World Tour (1 title, 1 runner-up) ===
The BWF World Tour, which was announced on 19 March 2017 and implemented in 2018, is a series of elite badminton tournaments sanctioned by the Badminton World Federation (BWF). The BWF World Tour is divided into levels of World Tour Finals, Super 1000, Super 750, Super 500, Super 300 (part of the HSBC World Tour), and the BWF Tour Super 100.

Women's singles
Year	Tournament	Level	Opponent	Score	Result	Ref.
2023 (I)	Indonesia Masters	Super 100	(Chinese Taipei) Chiu Pin-chian	21–15, 21–19	(gold) Winner	
2024	Australian Open	Super 500	(Japan) Aya Ohori	21–17, 19–21, 16–21	(silver) Runner-up	

=== BWF International Challenge/Series (3 titles, 3 runners-up) ===
Women's singles
Year	Tournament	Opponent	Score	Result	Ref.
2022	Mongolia International	(Indonesia) Sri Fatmawati	14–21, 21–23	(silver) Runner-up	
2022 (I)	Indonesia International	(Indonesia) Komang Ayu Cahya Dewi	15–21, 21–14, 21–15	(gold) Winner	
2022	Bahrain International	(Chinese Taipei) Wang Yu-si	19–21, 16–21	(silver) Runner-up	
2022	Bahrain International Challenge	(Thailand) Pitchamon Opatniputh	17–21, 16–21	(silver) Runner-up	
2023 (I)	Indonesia International	(Indonesia) Gabriela Meilani Moningka	21–13, 21–16	(gold) Winner	

Women's doubles
Year	Tournament	Opponent	Score	Result	Ref.
2026 (III)	Indonesia International	(Indonesia) Lanny Tria Mayasari	(Malaysia) Cheng Su Hui (Malaysia) Chong Jie Yu	21–9, 22–20	(gold) Winner

BWF International Challenge tournament
BWF International Series tournament

=== BWF Junior International (2 titles) ===
Girls' singles
Year	Tournament	Opponent	Score	Result	Ref.
2021	Finnish Junior International	(Indonesia) Siti Sarah Azzahra	21–14, 21–12	(gold) Winner	
2022	Alpes U-19 International	(Indonesia) Tasya Farahnailah	21–11, 10–21, 21–13	(gold) Winner	

BWF Junior International Grand Prix tournament
BWF Junior International Challenge tournament
BWF Junior International Series tournament
BWF Junior Future Series tournament

== Performance timeline ==
Key

W	Won	F	Finalist	SF	Semi-finalist
QF	Quarter-finalist	#R	Rounds 4, 3, 2, 1	RR	Round-robin stage
Q#	Qualification round	A	Absent	w/d	Withdrew
G	Gold	S	Silver	B	Bronze
NH	Not held	N/A	Not applicable	DNQ	Did not qualify

=== National team ===
- Junior level

Events	2022	Ref
World Junior Championships	B	

- Senior level

Team	2020	2021	2022	2023	2024	2025	2026	Ref
Asia Team Championships	DNP	NH	DNP	NH	B	NH	B	
Uber Cup	QF	NH	DNP	NH	S	NH	B	
Sudirman Cup	NH	QF	NH	DNP	NH	B	NH	

=== Individual competition ===
==== Junior level ====
Tournament	2022	Ref
World Junior Championships	B	

==== Senior level ====
===== Women's singles =====
Events	2023	2024	2025	Ref
SEA Games	B	NH		
Asian Championships	A	1R	1R	

Tournament	BWF World Tour				Best	Ref
Tournament	2023	2024	2025	2026	Best	Ref
Indonesia Masters	A	2R	A		2R ('24)	
Thailand Masters	A	QF	A		QF ('24)	
Ruichang China Masters	A		SF	A	SF ('25)	
Swiss Open	A	1R	A		1R ('24)	
Orléans Masters	2R	A			2R ('23)	
Baoji China Masters	NA	A		1R	1R ('26)	
Thailand Open	A	1R	A		1R ('24)	
Malaysia Masters	A	2R	A		2R ('24)	
Indonesia Open	A	2R	A		2R ('24)	
Australian Open	1R	F	A		F ('24)	
Japan Open	A	2R	A		2R ('24)	
Taipei Open	A		1R	A	1R ('25)	
Korea Masters	SF	A			SF ('23)	
Indonesia Masters Super 100	W	A			W ('23)	
Indonesia Masters Super 100	1R	A			W ('23)	
Kaohsiung Masters	A	QF	A		QF ('24)	
Korea Open	A	1R	A		1R ('24)	
Guwahati Masters	2R	A			2R ('23)	
Spain Masters	A	QF	NH		QF ('24)	
Year-end ranking	50	34	154		22	
Tournament	2023	2024	2025	2026	Best	Ref

===== Women's doubles =====
Tournament	BWF World Tour	Best	Ref
Tournament	2026	Best	Ref
Indonesia Masters Super 100	QF	QF ('26^{I}, '26^{II})	
Indonesia Masters Super 100	QF	QF ('26^{I}, '26^{II})	
Malaysia Super 100	2R	2R ('26)	
