= 2022 Badminton Asia Team Championships =

Badminton championships

Tournament details
- Dates: 15–20 February
- Edition: 4
- Venue: Setia City Convention Centre
- Location: Shah Alam, Selangor, Malaysia

Champions
- Men's teams: Malaysia
- Women's teams: Indonesia

The 2022 Badminton Asia Team Championships (also known as the 2022 Selangor Badminton Asia Team Championship) was the fourth edition of Badminton Asia Team Championships, held at Setia City Convention Centre in Shah Alam, Selangor, Malaysia, from 15 to 20 February 2022. This championships was organised by the Badminton Asia with Badminton Association of Malaysia as the host organiser. It was sanctioned by the Badminton World Federation. It served as the Asian qualifiers for the 2022 Thomas & Uber Cup in Thailand. Indonesia, the three-time champions, and Japan were the defending champions of the men's and women's category respectively.

== Background ==
The 2022 Badminton Asia Team Championships will crown the best male and female national badminton teams in Asia and at the same time serve as the Asian qualification event towards the 2022 Thomas & Uber Cup finals.

=== Competition format ===
The competition begins with a group stage: all participating teams are divided into four groups of two or three teams each. Each team plays each other once, with the top two teams advancing to the knockout stage. A match is won by the team that first wins three games. The eight teams that qualify will be drawn and compete in a knockout format until the final.

Tie-breaker

Team ranking within a group is determined based on the following criteria: number of wins; match difference; game difference; and points difference. If two teams are tied after a criterion is applied, the winner of the match between the two teams will be ranked higher. A draw will be held to determine ranking if there are still teams tied after all criteria are applied.

=== Hosting ===
In January 2022, Malaysia was selected to host the championships, with Shah Alam selected as its host city and the venue being the Setia City Convention Centre.

== Schedule ==
Day, Date	Time	Phase
Tuesday, 15 February	10:00	Group Stage
Tuesday, 15 February	16:00	Group Stage
Wednesday, 16 February	10:00	Group Stage
Wednesday, 16 February	16:00	Group Stage
Thursday, 17 February	10:00	Group Stage
Thursday, 17 February	16:00	Group Stage
Friday, 18 February	10:00	Group Stage
Friday, 18 February	16:00	Group Stage
Saturday, 19 February	10:00	Semi-finals
Saturday, 19 February	16:00	Semi-finals
Sunday, 20 February	10:00	Finals
Sunday, 20 February	16:00	Finals
Note: All times are in Malaysia Standard Time (UTC+08:00)

== Teams ==
=== Participating members ===
The tournament will feature 8 teams competing in the men's category and 7 teams in the women's category.

Nation	Men's	Women's	Nation	Men's	Women's
Hong Kong	Yes	Yes	Kazakhstan	Yes	Yes
India	Yes	Yes	South Korea	Yes	Yes
Indonesia	Yes	Yes	Malaysia	Yes	Yes
Japan	Yes	Yes	Singapore	Yes	—N/a

== Draw ==
=== Seedings ===
The seeding was based on team ranking on 25 January 2022.

- Men's team
  1. Indonesia
  2. Japan
- Women's team
  1. Japan
  2. South Korea

=== Drawn groups ===
The draw was held on 8 February 2022 at the Selangor State Sports Council in Shah Alam at 1:30pm. Both men's and women's team group stage consist of 2 groups, A and B and Y and Z with 4 teams respectively except for group Y (3 teams). Due to the COVID-19 pandemic, teams from Chinese Taipei and Thailand withdrew from the tournament.

- Men's team

Group A	Group B
Indonesia (1); India; South Korea; Hong Kong	Japan (2); Malaysia (H); Singapore; Kazakhstan

- Women's team

Group Y	Group Z
Japan (1); India; Malaysia (H); Singapore (WDN)	South Korea (2); Indonesia; Hong Kong; Kazakhstan

== Medal summary ==
=== Medal table ===
* Host nation (Malaysia)

Rank	Nation	Gold	Silver	Bronze	Total
1	Indonesia	1	1	0	2
2	Malaysia*	1	0	1	2
3	South Korea	0	1	1	2
4	Japan	0	0	1	1
4	Singapore	0	0	1	1
Totals (5 entries)		2	2	4	8

=== Medalists ===
Event	Gold	Silver	Bronze
Men's team	Malaysia; Aidil Sholeh; Aaron Chia; Goh Sze Fei; Nur Izzuddin; Kok Jing Hong; Lee Zii Jia; Leong Jun Hao; Lim Chong King; Man Wei Chong; Ng Tze Yong; Soh Wooi Yik; Tee Kai Wun	Indonesia; Christian Adinata; Leo Rolly Carnando; Chico Aura Dwi Wardoyo; Muhammad Shohibul Fikri; Pramudya Kusumawardana; Daniel Marthin; Bagas Maulana; Yeremia Rambitan; Yonathan Ramlie; Ikhsan Rumbay	Singapore; Danny Bawa Chrisnanta; Terry Hee; Wesley Koh; Joel Koh; Junsuke Kubo; Andy Kwek; Lim Ming Hong; Loh Kean Hean; Loh Kean Yew; Jason Teh
Men's team	Malaysia; Aidil Sholeh; Aaron Chia; Goh Sze Fei; Nur Izzuddin; Kok Jing Hong; Lee Zii Jia; Leong Jun Hao; Lim Chong King; Man Wei Chong; Ng Tze Yong; Soh Wooi Yik; Tee Kai Wun	Indonesia; Christian Adinata; Leo Rolly Carnando; Chico Aura Dwi Wardoyo; Muhammad Shohibul Fikri; Pramudya Kusumawardana; Daniel Marthin; Bagas Maulana; Yeremia Rambitan; Yonathan Ramlie; Ikhsan Rumbay	South Korea; Jeon Hyeok-jin; Jeong Min-sun; Jin Yong; Kim Hwi-tae; Kim Jae-hwan; Kim Joo-wan; Na Sung-seung; Noh Jin-seong; Park Sang-yong; Yun Dae-il
Women's team	Indonesia; Febriana Dwipuji Kusuma; Nita Violina Marwah; Lanny Tria Mayasari; Jesita Putri Miantoro; Saifi Rizka Nurhidayah; Bilqis Prasista; Amalia Cahaya Pratiwi; Gregoria Mariska Tunjung; Putri Kusuma Wardani; Stephanie Widjaja	South Korea; Baek Ha-na; Kim Joo-eun; Kim Min-ji; Lee Se-yeon; Lee Seo-jin; Park Min-jeong; Seong Seung-yeon; Sim Yu-jin	Malaysia; Anna Cheong; Eoon Qi Xuan; Go Pei Kee; Myisha Mohd Khairul; Low Yeen Yuan; Siti Nurshuhaini; Kisona Selvaduray; Valeree Siow; Pearly Tan; Tan Zhing Yi; Teoh Mei Xing; Thinaah Muralitharan
Women's team	Indonesia; Febriana Dwipuji Kusuma; Nita Violina Marwah; Lanny Tria Mayasari; Jesita Putri Miantoro; Saifi Rizka Nurhidayah; Bilqis Prasista; Amalia Cahaya Pratiwi; Gregoria Mariska Tunjung; Putri Kusuma Wardani; Stephanie Widjaja	South Korea; Baek Ha-na; Kim Joo-eun; Kim Min-ji; Lee Se-yeon; Lee Seo-jin; Park Min-jeong; Seong Seung-yeon; Sim Yu-jin	Japan; Hina Akechi; Riko Gunji; Rui Hirokami; Yuna Kato; Hirari Mizui; Natsuki Nidaira; Natsuki Oie; Maya Taguchi
