= Hediana Julimarbela =

Indonesian badminton player (born 1999)

Personal information
- Born: 5 March 1999 (age 27) Batam, Riau Islands, Indonesia

Sport
- Country: Indonesia
- Sport: Badminton
- Handedness: Right

Mixed doubles
- Highest ranking: 28 (with Zachariah Josiahno Sumanti 7 February 2023)
- BWF profile
Medal record
Women's badminton
Representing Indonesia
SEAn Games
Silver medal – second place	2023 Cambodia	Women's team

Hediana Julimarbela (born 5 March 1999) is an Indonesian badminton player affiliated with Exist Jakarta club.

== Career ==
In 2018, Julimarbela lost in the semi-finals of the Hyderabad Open partnering with Renaldi Samosir.

In 2019, Julimarbela won the mixed doubles title at the Indonesia International partnering with Zachariah Josiahno Sumanti.

In 2021, Julimarbela and Sumanti reached the semi-finals in the Orléans Masters.

In 2022, Julimarbela and Sumanti won their second title in the Italian International. They made their debut in the BWF World Championships, but lost in the second round from 15th seeds Robin Tabeling and Selena Piek from the Netherlands. In September, they finished as the semi-finalists in the Vietnam Open, stopped by fellow Indonesian pair Dejan Ferdinansyah and Gloria Emanuelle Widjaja. In October, they lost in first round of 2022 Denmark Open from the to top seeds Dechapol Puavaranukroh and Sapsiree Taerattanachai.

=== 2023 ===
In January, Julimarbela and Sumanti started their season by losing in the first round of the Malaysia Open from the 2021 All England Open runner-up Yuki Kaneko and Misaki Matsutomo of Japan. In the following week, they lost again in the first round of the India Open from Danish pair Mathias Christiansen and Alexandra Bøje. They competed at the home tournament, Indonesia Masters, but had to lose in the first round from English pair Gregory Mairs and Jenny Moore. In the next tournament, they lost in the quarter-finals of the Thailand Masters from Korean pair Kim Won-ho and Jeong Na-eun.

In March, Julimarbela and Sumanti competed in the All England Open but had to lose in the second round from Dutch pair Robin Tabeling and Selena Piek. In the next tour, they lost in the first round of Swiss Open from junior Chinese Taipei pair Chiu Hsiang-chieh and Lin Xiao-min who came from qualification. In the next tour, they competed in the Spain Masters, but had to lose in the first round from 8th seed Danish pair Mathias Christiansen and Alexandra Bøje.

In April, Julimarbela and Sumanti competed at the Orléans Masters in France, but had to lose in the first round from English pair Gregory Mairs and Jenny Moore.

In May, Julimarbela joining the women's team that won silver medal at the 2023 Cambodia SEA Games. In the individual event, she and her partner, Sumanti, had to lose in the first round from Thai pair Pakkapon Teeraratsakul and Phataimas Muenwong. Julimarbela and Sumanti continued with unsatisfactory results, where they lost in the first rounds of second Asian Tour in the tournament Malaysia Masters, and Thailand Open.

In June, Julimarbela and Sumanti competed at the home tournament, Indonesia Open, but lost in the first round from 3rd seed Thai player Dechapol Puavaranukroh and Sapsiree Taerattanachai.

In September, Julimarbela and Sumanti as the 1st seed lost at the first round of Indonesia Masters Super 100 I from Thai pair Pakkapon Teeraratsakul and Phataimas Muenwong.

== Achievements ==
=== BWF International Challenge/Series (2 titles) ===
Mixed doubles
Year	Tournament	Partner	Opponent	Score	Result	Ref.
2019	Indonesia International	(Indonesia) Zachariah Josiahno Sumanti	(Indonesia) Rian Agung Saputro (Indonesia) Tiara Rosalia Nuraidah	22–20, 21–14	(gold) Winner	
2022	Italian International	(Indonesia) Zachariah Josiahno Sumanti	(Thailand) Ruttanapak Oupthong (Thailand) Chasinee Korepap	22–20, 21–9	(gold) Winner	

BWF International Challenge tournament
BWF International Series tournament
BWF Future Series tournament

== Performance timeline ==
Key

W	Won	F	Finalist	SF	Semi-finalist
QF	Quarter-finalist	#R	Rounds 4, 3, 2, 1	RR	Round-robin stage
Q#	Qualification round	A	Absent	w/d	Withdrew
G	Gold	S	Silver	B	Bronze
NH	Not held	N/A	Not applicable	DNQ	Did not qualify

=== National team ===
- Senior level

Team events	2023	Ref
SEA Games	S	

=== Individual competitions ===
==== Junior level ====
Event	2017
Asian Junior Championships	2R
World Junior Championships	3R

==== Senior level ====
===== Women's doubles =====
Tournament	BWF World Tour	Best
Tournament	2018	Best
Hyderabad Open	1R	1R ('18)
Year-end ranking	616	567

===== Mixed doubles =====
Events	2022	2023	Ref
SEA Games	NH	1R	
World Championships	2R	DNQ	

Tournament	BWF World Tour						Best	Ref
Tournament	2018	2019	2020	2021	2022	2023	Best	Ref
Malaysia Open	A		NH		A	1R	1R ('23)	
India Open	A		NH		A	1R	1R ('23)	
Indonesia Masters	A			2R	A	1R	2R ('21)	
Thailand Masters	A			NH		QF	QF ('23)	
All England Open	A					2R	2R ('23)	
Swiss Open	A		NH	A		1R	1R ('23)	
Spain Masters	A			2R	NH	1R	2R ('21)	
Orléans Masters	A	1R	NH	SF	2R	1R	SF ('21)	
Malaysia Masters	A			NH	1R	1R	1R ('22, '23)	
Thailand Open	A			NH	2R	1R	2R ('22)	
Singapore Open	A		NH		1R	A	1R ('22)	
Indonesia Open	A		NH	1R	A	1R	1R ('21, '23)	
Taipei Open	A		NH		w/d	A	—	
Indonesia Masters Super 100	1R	1R	NH		A	1R	2R ('23)	
Indonesia Masters Super 100	1R	1R	NH		A	2R	2R ('23)	
Vietnam Open	A	1R	NH		SF	A	SF ('22)	
Denmark Open	A				1R	A	1R ('22)	
French Open	A		NH	A	2R	A	2R ('22)	
Hylo Open	A				1R	A	1R ('22)	
Hyderabad Open	SF	A	NH				SF ('18)	
Year-end ranking	117	178	164	81	34	52	28	
Tournament	2018	2019	2020	2021	2022	2023	Best	Ref
