= Badminton at the 2021 SEA Games – Men's team =

Badminton – Men's team at the 2021 SEA Games
- Venue: Bac Giang Gymnasium
- Dates: 16–18 May 2022
- Nations: 8

Medalists
gold medal	Thailand (THA)
silver medal	Malaysia (MAS)
bronze medal	Indonesia (INA)
bronze medal	Singapore (SGP)

The badminton men's team tournament at the 2021 SEA Games was held from 16 to 18 May 2022 at the Bac Giang Gymnasium, Bắc Giang, Vietnam.

== Schedule ==
All times are Vietnam Standard Time (UTC+07:00)

Date	Time	Event
Monday, 16 May	15:00	Quarter-final
Tuesday, 17 May	15:00	Semi-final
Wednesday, 18 May	18:00	Gold medal match

== Bracket ==
Quarter-finals
1	Indonesia (INA)	3
Cambodia (CAM)	0
3/4	Thailand (THA)	3
Philippines (PHI)	0
Laos (LAO)	0
3/4	Singapore (SGP)	3
Vietnam (VIE)	1
2	Malaysia (MAS)	3

Semi-finals
1	Indonesia (INA)	2
3/4	Thailand (THA)	3
3/4	Singapore (SGP)	2
2	Malaysia (MAS)	3

Final
3/4	Thailand (THA)	3
2	Malaysia (MAS)	0

== Quarter-finals ==
=== Indonesia vs Cambodia ===
Indonesia
3
Bac Giang Gymnasium Court 4
16 May 2022 15:00 UTC+7

Cambodia
0

			1	2	3
1	(Indonesia) (Cambodia)	Chico Aura Dwi Wardoyo; Vannthoun Vath	21; 6	21; 9
2	(Indonesia) (Cambodia)	Pramudya Kusumawardana / Yeremia Rambitan; Heng Mengleap / Yam Samnang	21; 7	21; 14
3	(Indonesia) (Cambodia)	Christian Adinata; Sok Rikreay	21; 7	21; 6
4	(Indonesia) (Cambodia)	Leo Rolly Carnando / Daniel Marthin; Sorn Liza / Phal Risatya				not played
5	(Indonesia) (Cambodia)	Yonathan Ramlie; Meng Ly Jeng				not played

=== Thailand vs Philippines ===
Thailand
3
Bac Giang Gymnasium Court 3
16 May 2022 15:00 UTC+7

Philippines
0

			1	2	3
1	(Thailand) (Philippines)	Kunlavut Vitidsarn; Ros Pedrosa	21; 12	21; 9
2	(Thailand) (Philippines)	Chaloempon Charoenkitamorn / Nanthakarn Yordphaisong; Christian Bernardo / Paul Pantig	21; 14	15; 21	21; 10
3	(Thailand) (Philippines)	Khosit Phetpradab; Jewel Aibo	21; 16	21; 11
4	(Thailand) (Philippines)	Peeratchai Sukphun / Pakkapon Teeraratsakul; Solomon Padiz Jr. / Julius Villabrille				not played
5	(Thailand) (Philippines)	Panitchaphon Teeraratsakul; Rabbie Jayson Oba-Ob				not played

=== Laos vs Singapore ===
Laos
0
Bac Giang Gymnasium Court 2
16 May 2022 15:00 UTC+7

Singapore
3

			1	2	3
1	(Laos) (Singapore)	Vixunnalath Phichith; Loh Kean Yew	12; 21	3; 21
2	(Laos) (Singapore)	Namboun Luangamath / Daomixay Vorlasing; Danny Bawa Chrisnanta / Andy Kwek	21; 15	8; 21	8; 21
3	(Laos) (Singapore)	Phonesack Sokthavy; Jason Teh	11; 21	5; 21
4	(Laos) (Singapore)	Vixunnalath Phichith / Bounpaseuth Vanthanouvong; Wesley Koh / Junsuke Kubo				not played
5	(Laos) (Singapore)	Khamla Xeune; Joel Koh				not played

=== Vietnam vs Malaysia ===
Vietnam
1
Bac Giang Gymnasium Court 1
16 May 2022 15:00 UTC+7

Malaysia
3

			1	2	3
1	(Vietnam) (Malaysia)	Nguyễn Tiến Minh; Kok Jing Hong	21; 14	24; 26	21; 7
2	(Vietnam) (Malaysia)	Đỗ Tuấn Đức / Phạm Hồng Nam; Man Wei Chong / Tee Kai Wun	8; 21	22; 20	18; 21
3	(Vietnam) (Malaysia)	Lê Đức Phát; Lee Shun Yang	19; 21	25; 27
4	(Vietnam) (Malaysia)	Đinh Hoàng Nguyễn / Đinh Mạnh Trần; Junaidi Arif / Muhammad Haikal	21; 15	12; 21	20; 22
5	(Vietnam) (Malaysia)	Nguyễn Tiên Tuấn; Shahyar Shaqeem				not played

== Semi-finals ==
=== Indonesia vs Thailand ===
Indonesia
2
Bac Giang Gymnasium Court 2
17 May 2022 15:00 UTC+7

Thailand
3

			1	2	3
1	(Indonesia) (Thailand)	Chico Aura Dwi Wardoyo; Kunlavut Vitidsarn	14; 21	14; 21
2	(Indonesia) (Thailand)	Pramudya Kusumawardana / Yeremia Rambitan; Chaloempon Charoenkitamorn / Nanthakarn Yordphaisong	21; 16	12; 21	21; 16
3	(Indonesia) (Thailand)	Christian Adinata; Sitthikom Thammasin	11; 21	12; 21
4	(Indonesia) (Thailand)	Leo Rolly Carnando / Daniel Marthin; Peeratchai Sukphun / Pakkapon Teeraratsakul	21; 8	21; 13
5	(Indonesia) (Thailand)	Bobby Setiabudi; Panitchaphon Teeraratsakul	18; 21	19; 21

=== Singapore vs Malaysia ===
Singapore
2
Bac Giang Gymnasium Court 1
17 May 2022 15:00 UTC+7

Malaysia
3

			1	2	3
1	(Singapore) (Malaysia)	Loh Kean Yew; Kok Jing Hong	21; 12	21; 12
2	(Singapore) (Malaysia)	Terry Hee / Loh Kean Hean; Junaidi Arif / Man Wei Chong	21; 19	21; 13
3	(Singapore) (Malaysia)	Jason Teh; Lee Shun Yang	12; 21	23; 21	16; 21
4	(Singapore) (Malaysia)	Danny Bawa Chrisnanta / Andy Kwek; Chen Tang Jie / Muhammad Haikal	17; 21	15; 21
5	(Singapore) (Malaysia)	Joel Koh; Shahyar Shaqeem	10; 21	17; 21

== Finals ==
=== Thailand vs Malaysia ===
Thailand
3
Bac Giang Gymnasium
18 May 2022 18:00 UTC+7

Malaysia
0

			1	2	3
1	(Thailand) (Malaysia)	Kunlavut Vitidsarn; Kok Jing Hong	21; 10	21; 15
2	(Thailand) (Malaysia)	Chaloempon Charoenkitamorn / Nanthakarn Yordphaisong; Man Wei Chong / Tee Kai Wun	22; 20	22; 20
3	(Thailand) (Malaysia)	Khosit Phetpradab; Lee Shun Yang	16; 21	21; 13	21; 19
4	(Thailand) (Malaysia)	Peeratchai Sukphun / Pakkapon Teeraratsakul; Chen Tang Jie / Muhammad Haikal				not played
5	(Thailand) (Malaysia)	Panitchaphon Teeraratsakul; Shahyar Shaqeem				not played

== See also ==
- Individual event
- Women's team tournament
