= Komang Ayu Cahya Dewi =

Indonesian badminton player (born 2002)

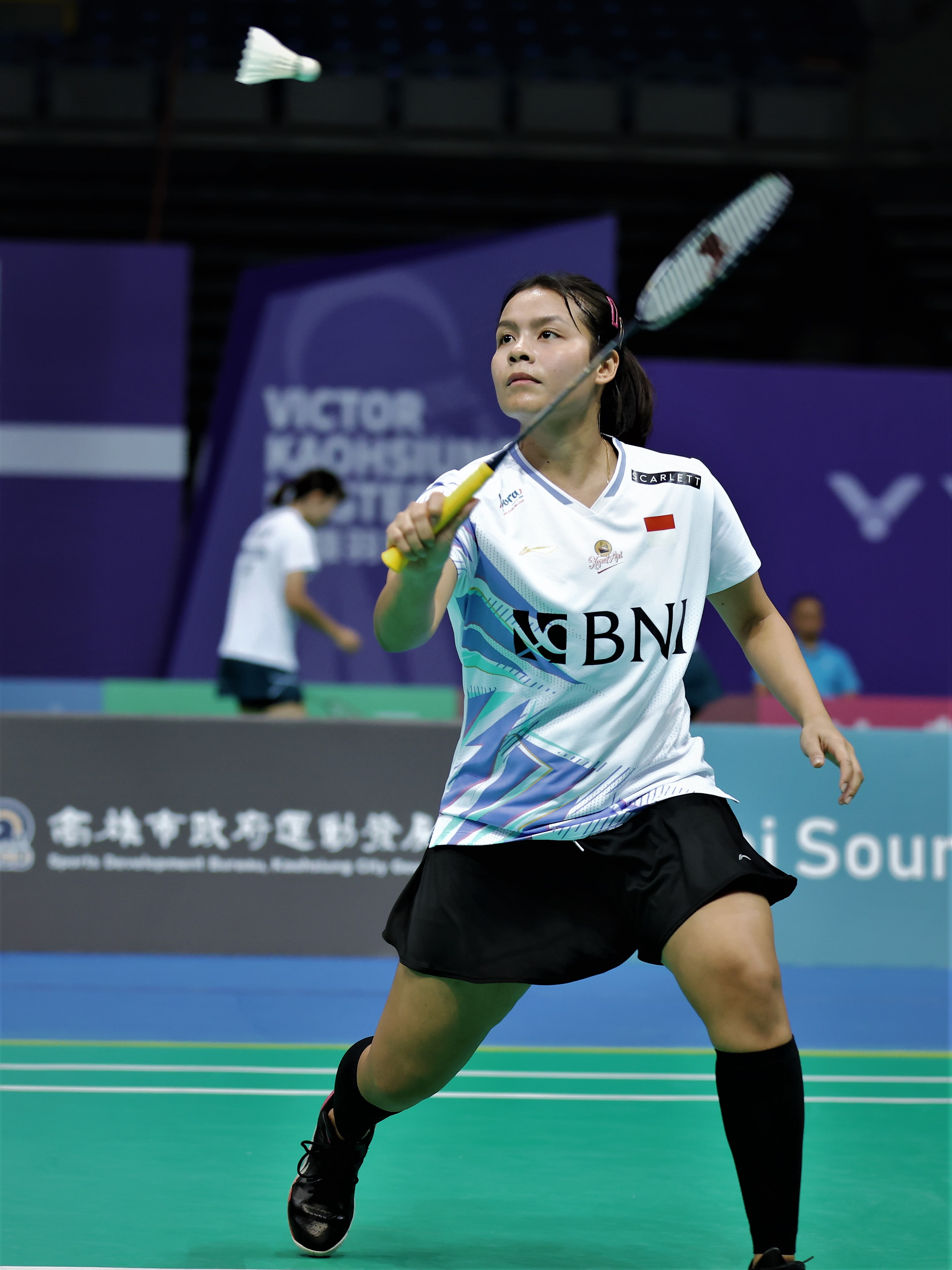
- Dewi at the 2024 Kaohsiung Masters

Personal information
- Born: 21 October 2002 (age 24) Buleleng, Bali, Indonesia

Sport
- Country: Indonesia
- Sport: Badminton
- Handedness: Right

Women's singles
- Highest ranking: 32 (13 May 2025)
- Current ranking: 94 (7 April 2026)
- BWF profile
Medal record
Women's badminton
Representing Indonesia
Uber Cup
Silver medal – second place	2024 Chengdu	Women's team
Asia Mixed Team Championships
Gold medal – first place	2025 Qingdao	Mixed team
Asian Team Championships
Bronze medal – third place	2024 Selangor	Women's team
SEA Games
Silver medal – second place	2023 Cambodia	Women's team
Bronze medal – third place	2023 Cambodia	Women's singles

Komang Ayu Cahya Dewi (born 21 October 2002) is an Indonesian badminton player affiliated with Djarum Badminton Club. She was invited to be part of Indonesia's national badminton team in 2020.

== Career ==
In 2021, Dewi won silver at the XX National Sports Week, losing to Saifi Rizka Nurhidayah at the final, making her the first badminton medalist from Bali since the inception of the event. She also reached the final of Bahrain International Series, but had to lose to her teammate Aisyah Sativa Fatetani.

=== 2022 ===
In late April, Dewi competed at the Asian Championships in Muntinlupa, Philippines, but had to lose in the second round from 1st seed and eventual finalist Japanese player Akane Yamaguchi.

In July, Dewi competed at the Taipei Open but had to lose in the second round from Malaysian player Goh Jin Wei.

In October, Dewi reached the final of Yogyakarta Indonesia International, but had to lose to her teammate Ester Nurumi Tri Wardoyo in three games. In the next tournament, she lost in the semi-finals at the Indonesia Masters Super 100 from Japanese player Riko Gunji.

=== 2023 ===
In early February, Komang Ayu Cahya Dewi started the season competing at the Thailand Masters. Unfortunately, she lost in the first round from Chinese Taipei player Hsu Wen-chi in three games.

In late April, Dewi competed at the Asian Championships in Dubai, United Arab Emirates, but had to lose in the second round from her senior teammate Gregoria Mariska Tunjung.

In May, Dewi join the Indonesia team at the 2023 SEA Games and took the silver medal after losing to Thai team in the final. She also competed at the women's singles as 4th seed, but lost in the semi-finals to 1st seed Thai player Lalinrat Chaiwan.

In June, Dewi lost in the final of Denmark Masters from Estonian player Kristin Kuuba in rubber games. In the next tournament, she won her first title at the Nantes International defeating Chinese Taipei player Liang Ting-yu in rubber games.

In early August, Dewi competed at the Australian Open, but had to lose in the second round from 8th seed Japanese player Aya Ohori in straight games.

In September, Dewi competed at the Indonesia Masters Super 100 I but lost at the semi-finals from fellow Indonesian player Ester Nurumi Tri Wardoyo in rubber games. She joining the Indonesia squad at the Asian Games, but the team was eliminated in the quarter finals.

=== 2024 ===
In 2024, Dewi who ranked as world number 64 in the BWF rankings, opened the season with early defeats in the Thailand Masters. She then reached the semi-finals at the Spain Masters, lost the match to Ratchanok Intanon. She was selected as a member of the Indonesian women's team at the Asia Team Championships in February, and the Uber Cup in May, where the team won a bronze medal at the Asian Championships, and then made history by reaching the final at the Uber Cup since 2008. In the final Indonesia lost to China 0–3.

== Achievements ==
=== SEA Games ===
Women's singles
Year	Venue	Opponent	Score	Result	Ref.
2023	Morodok Techo Badminton Hall; Phnom Penh, Cambodia	(Thailand) Lalinrat Chaiwan	14–21, 18–21	Bronze	

=== BWF World Tour (1 runner-up) ===
The BWF World Tour, which was announced on 19 March 2017 and implemented in 2018, is a series of elite badminton tournaments sanctioned by the Badminton World Federation (BWF). The BWF World Tours are divided into levels of World Tour Finals, Super 1000, Super 750, Super 500, Super 300, and the BWF Tour Super 100.

Women's singles
Year	Tournament	Level	Opponent	Score	Result	Ref.
2025	Thailand Masters	Super 300	(Thailand) Pornpawee Chochuwong	21–18, 16–21, 13–21	(silver) Runner-up	

=== BWF International Challenge/Series (1 title, 4 runners-up) ===
Women's singles
Year	Tournament	Opponent	Score	Result	Ref.
2021	Bahrain International Series	(Indonesia) Aisyah Sativa Fatetani	21–14, 14–21, 19–21	(silver) Runner-up	
2022 (I)	Indonesia International	(Indonesia) Ester Nurumi Tri Wardoyo	21–15, 14–21, 15–21	(silver) Runner-up	
2023	Denmark Masters	(Estonia) Kristin Kuuba	21–16, 16–21, 10–21	(silver) Runner-up	
2023	Nantes International	(Chinese Taipei) Liang Ting-yu	21–18, 13–21, 21–7	(gold) Winner	
2026	Singapore International	(Malaysia) Goh Jin Wei	11–21, 11–21	(silver) Runner-up	

BWF International Challenge tournament
BWF International Series tournament

== Performance timeline ==
Key

W	Won	F	Finalist	SF	Semi-finalist
QF	Quarter-finalist	#R	Rounds 4, 3, 2, 1	RR	Round-robin stage
Q#	Qualification round	A	Absent		
G	Gold	S	Silver	B	Bronze
NH	Not held	N/A	Not applicable	DNQ	Did not qualify

To avoid confusion and double counting, these charts are updated at the conclusion of a tournament or when the player's participation has ended.

=== National team ===
- Senior level

Team events	2022	2023	2024	2025	Ref
SEA Games	NH	S	NH		
Asia Team Championships	DNP	NH	B	NH	
Asia Mixed Team Championships	NH	A	NH	G	
Asian Games	QF	NH			
Uber Cup	QF	NH	S	NH	

=== Individual competitions ===
- Senior level

Events	2022	2023	2024	2025	Ref
SEA Games	NH	B	NH		
Asian Championships	2R	2R	A	2R	

Tournament	BWF World Tour					Best	Ref
Tournament	2022	2023	2024	2025	2026	Best	Ref
Indonesia Masters	A			1R	A	1R ('25)	
Thailand Masters	NH	1R	1R	F	1R	F ('25)	
German Open	A			1R	A	1R ('25)	
Orléans Masters	A			1R	A	1R ('25)	
Thailand Open	A		QF	1R	A	QF ('24)	
Malaysia Masters	A		1R	A		1R ('24)	
Indonesia Open	A			1R	A	1R ('25)	
Australian Open	A	2R	QF	A		QF ('24)	
Macau Open	NH		1R	1R	A	1R ('24, '25)	
Taipei Open	2R	A	1R	1R	A	2R ('22)	
Korea Masters	A	2R	1R	A		2R ('23)	
Indonesia Masters Super 100	SF	SF	A			SF ('22, '23)	
Indonesia Masters Super 100	SF	w/d	A			SF ('22, '23)	
Kaohsiung Masters	NH	A	SF	A		SF ('24)	
Japan Masters	NH	A	1R	A		1R ('24)	
Hong Kong Open	NH	A	2R	A		2R ('24)	
Spain Masters	NH	A	SF	NH		SF ('24)	
Year-end ranking	58	64	44	60		32	
Tournament	2022	2023	2024	2025	2026	Best	Ref
