= Badminton at the 2021 SEA Games =

Events at 2021 SEA Games

- Venue: Bac Giang Gymnasium
- Location: Bắc Giang, Vietnam
- Dates: 16–22 May 2022

The badminton competition at the 2021 SEA Games took place at Bac Giang Gymnasium in Bắc Giang, Vietnam from 16 to 22 May 2022. 7 events were featured similarly to the past edition.

== Medal table ==
* Host nation (Vietnam)

Rank	Nation	Gold	Silver	Bronze	Total
1	Thailand	4	2	0	6
2	Indonesia	2	2	5	9
3	Malaysia	1	2	1	4
4	Singapore	0	1	5	6
5	Vietnam*	0	0	3	3
Totals (5 entries)		7	7	14	28

== Medalists ==
Event	Gold	Silver	Bronze
Men's singles	Kunlavut Vitidsarn; Thailand	Loh Kean Yew; Singapore	Jason Teh; Singapore
Men's singles	Kunlavut Vitidsarn; Thailand	Loh Kean Yew; Singapore	Nguyễn Tiến Minh; Vietnam
Women's singles	Pornpawee Chochuwong; Thailand	Phittayaporn Chaiwan; Thailand	Putri Kusuma Wardani; Indonesia
Women's singles	Pornpawee Chochuwong; Thailand	Phittayaporn Chaiwan; Thailand	Gregoria Mariska Tunjung; Indonesia
Men's doubles	Indonesia; Leo Rolly Carnando; Daniel Marthin	Indonesia; Pramudya Kusumawardana; Yeremia Rambitan	Singapore; Terry Hee; Loh Kean Hean
Men's doubles	Indonesia; Leo Rolly Carnando; Daniel Marthin	Indonesia; Pramudya Kusumawardana; Yeremia Rambitan	Vietnam; Đỗ Tuấn Đức; Phạm Hồng Nam
Women's doubles	Indonesia; Apriyani Rahayu; Siti Fadia Silva Ramadhanti	Thailand; Benyapa Aimsaard; Nuntakarn Aimsaard	Singapore; Insyirah Khan; Bernice Lim
Women's doubles	Indonesia; Apriyani Rahayu; Siti Fadia Silva Ramadhanti	Thailand; Benyapa Aimsaard; Nuntakarn Aimsaard	Malaysia; Cheah Yee See; Cheng Su Hui
Mixed doubles	Malaysia; Chen Tang Jie; Peck Yen Wei	Malaysia; Hoo Pang Ron; Cheah Yee See	Indonesia; Rinov Rivaldy; Pitha Haningtyas Mentari
Mixed doubles	Malaysia; Chen Tang Jie; Peck Yen Wei	Malaysia; Hoo Pang Ron; Cheah Yee See	Indonesia; Adnan Maulana; Mychelle Crhystine Bandaso
Men's team	Thailand; Chaloempon Charoenkitamorn; Khosit Phetpradab; Tanadon Punpanich; Wachirawit Sothon; Peeratchai Sukphun; Pakkapon Teeraratsakul; Panitchaphon Teeraratsakul; Sitthikom Thammasin; Kunlavut Vitidsarn; Nanthakarn Yordphaisong	Malaysia; Junaidi Arif; Chen Tang Jie; Muhammad Haikal; Justin Hoh; Hoo Pang Ron; Kok Jing Hong; Lee Shun Yang; Man Wei Chong; Shahyar Shaqeem; Tee Kai Wun	Indonesia; Christian Adinata; Leo Rolly Carnando; Chico Aura Dwi Wardoyo; Pramudya Kusumawardana; Daniel Marthin; Adnan Maulana; Yeremia Rambitan; Yonathan Ramlie; Rinov Rivaldy; Bobby Setiabudi
Men's team	Thailand; Chaloempon Charoenkitamorn; Khosit Phetpradab; Tanadon Punpanich; Wachirawit Sothon; Peeratchai Sukphun; Pakkapon Teeraratsakul; Panitchaphon Teeraratsakul; Sitthikom Thammasin; Kunlavut Vitidsarn; Nanthakarn Yordphaisong	Malaysia; Junaidi Arif; Chen Tang Jie; Muhammad Haikal; Justin Hoh; Hoo Pang Ron; Kok Jing Hong; Lee Shun Yang; Man Wei Chong; Shahyar Shaqeem; Tee Kai Wun	Singapore; Danny Bawa Chrisnanta; Terry Hee; Wesley Koh; Joel Koh; Junsuke Kubo; Andy Kwek; Lim Shun Tian; Loh Kean Hean; Loh Kean Yew; Jason Teh
Women's team	Thailand; Benyapa Aimsaard; Nuntakarn Aimsaard; Phittayaporn Chaiwan; Pornpawee Chochuwong; Laksika Kanlaha; Supanida Katethong; Jongkolphan Kititharakul; Phataimas Muenwong; Pitchamon Opatniput; Rawinda Prajongjai	Indonesia; Mychelle Crhystine Bandaso; Febby Valencia Dwijayanti Gani; Pitha Haningtyas Mentari; Saifi Rizka Nurhidayah; Apriyani Rahayu; Siti Fadia Silva Ramadhanti; Ribka Sugiarto; Gregoria Mariska Tunjung; Putri Kusuma Wardani; Stephanie Widjaja	Singapore; Grace Chua; Jaslyn Hooi; Insyirah Khan; Jin Yujia; Megan Lee; Bernice Lim; Tan Wei Han; Crystal Wong; Yeo Jia Min
Women's team	Thailand; Benyapa Aimsaard; Nuntakarn Aimsaard; Phittayaporn Chaiwan; Pornpawee Chochuwong; Laksika Kanlaha; Supanida Katethong; Jongkolphan Kititharakul; Phataimas Muenwong; Pitchamon Opatniput; Rawinda Prajongjai	Indonesia; Mychelle Crhystine Bandaso; Febby Valencia Dwijayanti Gani; Pitha Haningtyas Mentari; Saifi Rizka Nurhidayah; Apriyani Rahayu; Siti Fadia Silva Ramadhanti; Ribka Sugiarto; Gregoria Mariska Tunjung; Putri Kusuma Wardani; Stephanie Widjaja	Vietnam; Đinh Thị Phương Hồng; Đỗ Thị Hoài; Nguyễn Thị Ngọc Lan; Nguyễn Thùy Linh; Phạm Như Thảo; Phạm Thị Khánh; Thân Vân Anh; Trần Thị Phương Thúy; Vũ Thị Anh Thư; Vũ Thị Trang
