= Low Yeen Yuan =

Malaysian badminton player

Low Yeen Yuan 罗迎箢
Personal information
- Born: 9 March 2002 (age 24) Lukut, Negeri Sembilan, Malaysia
- Height: 1.66 m (5 ft 5 in)

Sport
- Country: Malaysia
- Sport: Badminton
- Handedness: Right

Women's & mixed doubles
- Highest ranking: 37 (WD with Valeree Siow, 17 January 2023); 253 (XD with Muhammad Nurfirdaus Azman, 13 September 2021)
- Current ranking: 63 (WD with Go Pei Kee) (28 May 2024)
- BWF profile
Medal record
Women's badminton
Representing Malaysia
Asia Team Championships
Bronze medal – third place	2022 Selangor	Women's team
Southeast Asian Games
Bronze medal – third place	2023 Cambodia	Women's doubles

Low Yeen Yuan (simplified Chinese: 罗迎箢; traditional Chinese: 羅迎箢; pinyin: Luó Yíngyuān; born 9 March 2002) is a Malaysian badminton player. In 2021, she won three titles (Slovenian International, Latvia International and Hellas International) together with Valeree Siow in the women's doubles event.

== Achievements ==
=== Southeast Asian Games ===
Women's doubles
Year	Venue	Partner	Opponent	Score	Result
2023	Morodok Techo Badminton Hall; Phnom Penh, Cambodia	(Malaysia) Lee Xin Jie	(Indonesia) Febriana Dwipuji Kusuma (Indonesia) Amalia Cahaya Pratiwi	9–21, 9–21	Bronze

=== BWF International Challenge/Series (3 titles, 1 runner-up) ===
Women's doubles
Year	Tournament	Partner	Opponent	Score	Result
2021	Slovenian International	(Malaysia) Valeree Siow	(Denmark) Isabella Nielsen (Denmark) Maria Louise Steffensen	21–11, 21–15	(gold) Winner
2021	Latvia International	(Malaysia) Valeree Siow	(Italy) Martini Corsini (Italy) Judith Mair	21–7, 21–17	(gold) Winner
2021	Hellas International	(Malaysia) Valeree Siow	(Italy) Katharina Fink (Italy) Yasmine Hamza	21–15, 21–16	(gold) Winner

Mixed doubles
Year	Tournament	Partner	Opponent	Score	Result
2021	Latvia International	(Malaysia) Muhammad Nurfirdaus Azman	(Malaysia) Yap Roy King (Malaysia) Valeree Siow	20–22, 15–21	(silver) Runner-up

BWF International Challenge tournament
BWF International Series tournament
BWF Future Series tournament
