= Peeratchai Sukphun =

Thai badminton player (born 2004)

Personal information
- Born: 31 August 2004 (age 22) Lampang, Thailand
- Height: 1.75 m (5 ft 9 in)

Sport
- Country: Thailand
- Sport: Badminton
- Handedness: Right

Men's doubles
- Highest ranking: 25 (with Pakkapon Teeraratsakul, 27 October 2026)
- Current ranking: 28 (with Pakkapon Teeraratsakul, 10 November 2026)
- BWF profile
Medal record
Men's badminton
Representing Thailand
Asian Games
Bronze medal – third place	2026 Aichi–Nagoya	Men's team
Asia Mixed Team Championships
Bronze medal – third place	2023 Dubai	Mixed team
Bronze medal – third place	2025 Qingdao	Mixed team
World University Games
Bronze medal – third place	2021 Chengdu	Mixed team
Bronze medal – third place	2025 Rhine-Ruhr	Men's doubles
SEA Games
Gold medal – first place	2021 Vietnam	Men's team
Silver medal – second place	2023 Cambodia	Men's doubles
Bronze medal – third place	2023 Cambodia	Men's team
Bronze medal – third place	2025 Thailand	Men's team

Peeratchai Sukphun (Thai: พีรัชชัย สุขพันธ์; born 31 August 2004) is a Thai badminton player. He won the men's doubles title at the 2024 U.S. Open.

== Achievements ==
=== World University Games ===
Men's doubles
Year	Venue	Partner	Opponent	Score	Result
2025	Westenergie Sporthalle; Mülheim, Germany	(Thailand) Pakkapon Teeraratsakul	(China) Cui Hechen (China) Peng Jianqin	13–15, 15–13, 8–15	Bronze

=== SEA Games ===
Men's doubles
Year	Venue	Partner	Opponent	Score	Result
2023	Morodok Techo Badminton Hall; Phnom Penh, Cambodia	(Thailand) Pakkapon Teeraratsakul	(Indonesia) Pramudya Kusumawardana (Indonesia) Yeremia Rambitan	17–21, 19–21	Silver

=== BWF World Tour (1 title, 1 runner-up) ===
The BWF World Tour, which was announced on 19 March 2017 and implemented in 2018, is a series of elite badminton tournaments sanctioned by the Badminton World Federation (BWF). The BWF World Tours are divided into levels of World Tour Finals, Super 1000, Super 750, Super 500, Super 300, and the BWF Tour Super 100.

Men's doubles
Year	Tournament	Level	Partner	Opponent	Score	Result
2024	Thailand Masters	Super 300	(Thailand) Pakkapon Teeraratsakul	(China) He Jiting (China) Ren Xiangyu	21–16, 14–21, 13–21	(silver) Runner-up
2024	U.S. Open	Super 300	(Thailand) Pakkapon Teeraratsakul	(Chinese Taipei) Liu Kuang-heng (Chinese Taipei) Yang Po-han	13–21, 21–16, 21–11	(gold) Winner

=== BWF International Challenge/Series (1 title, 1 runner-up) ===
Men's doubles
Year	Tournament	Partner	Opponent	Score	Result
2022	Future Series Nouvelle-Aquitaine	(Thailand) Pakkapon Teeraratsakul	(Chinese Taipei) Lai Po-yu (Chinese Taipei) Tsai Fu-cheng	21–8, 25–23	(gold) Winner
2024	Thailand International	(Thailand) Pakkapon Teeraratsakul	(Malaysia) Aaron Tai (Malaysia) Kang Khai Xing	17–21, 18–21	(silver) Runner-up

BWF International Challenge tournament
BWF International Series tournament
BWF Future Series tournament
