= Nanthakarn Yordphaisong =

Thai badminton player (born 1993)

Personal information
- Born: 23 September 1993 (age 33) Bangkok, Thailand
- Height: 1.72 m (5 ft 8 in)

Sport
- Country: Thailand
- Sport: Badminton
- Handedness: Left

Men's doubles
- Highest ranking: 34 (with Chaloempon Charoenkitamorn 14 March 2023)
- BWF profile
Medal record
Men's badminton
Representing Thailand
Sudirman Cup
Bronze medal – third place	2017 Gold Coast	Mixed team
SEA Games
Gold medal – first place	2021 Vietnam	Men's team
Bronze medal – third place	2017 Kuala Lumpur	Men's team
Bronze medal – third place	2023 Cambodia	Men's team

Nanthakarn Yordphaisong (Thai: นันทกานต์ ยอดไพสง; born 23 September 1993) is a Thai badminton player. He was the men's doubles runner-up at the 2017 China and Vietnam International Challenge tournament partnered with Trawut Potieng. Yordphaisong also a part of the Thailand national team to win bronze at the 2017 Sudirman Cup.

== Achievements ==
=== BWF International Challenge/Series (4 titles, 7 runners-up) ===
Men's doubles
Year	Tournament	Partner	Opponent	Score	Result
2017	China International	(Thailand) Trawut Potieng	(Indonesia) Mohammad Ahsan (Indonesia) Rian Agung Saputro	11–8, 7–11, 4–11, 7–11	(silver) Runner-up
2017	Vietnam International	(Thailand) Trawut Potieng	(India) Satwiksairaj Rankireddy (India) Chirag Shetty	21–17, 9–21, 15–21	(silver) Runner-up
2017	Tata Open India International	(Thailand) Maneepong Jongjit	(Malaysia) Aaron Chia (Malaysia) Soh Wooi Yik	21–6, 21–9	(gold) Winner
2018	Vietnam International	(Thailand) Maneepong Jongjit	(Malaysia) Aaron Chia (Malaysia) Soh Wooi Yik	21–18, 21–14	(gold) Winner
2019	Myanmar International	(Thailand) Ruttanapak Oupthong	(Indonesia) Emanuel Randhy Febryto (Indonesia) Ferdian Mahardika Ranialdy	16–21, 15–21	(silver) Runner-up
2022	Nantes International	(Thailand) Chaloempon Charoenkitamorn	(Chinese Taipei) Su Ching-heng (Chinese Taipei) Ye Hong-wei	21–19, 17–21, 16–21	(silver) Runner-up
2022 (I)	India International Challenge	(Thailand) Chaloempon Charoenkitamorn	(India) Arjun M. R. (India) Dhruv Kapila	17–21, 22–20, 18–21	(silver) Runner-up
2022 (III)	India International Challenge	(Thailand) Chaloempon Charoenkitamorn	(Thailand) Tanadon Punpanich (Thailand) Wachirawit Sothon	21–11, 21–14	(gold) Winner
2022	Maldives International	(Thailand) Chaloempon Charoenkitamorn	(India) Rohan Kapoor (India) B. Sumeeth Reddy	23–21, 19–21, 17–21	(silver) Runner-up
2022	Bahrain International	(Thailand) Chaloempon Charoenkitamorn	(Indonesia) Rayhan Fadillah (Indonesia) Rahmat Hidayat	13–21, 17–21	(silver) Runner-up
2023	Thailand International	(Thailand) Chaloempon Charoenkitamorn	(Malaysia) Choong Hon Jian (Malaysia) Goh Sze Fei	15–21, 21–15, 24–22	(gold) Winner

BWF International Challenge tournament
BWF International Series tournament
