= Andy Kwek =

Singaporean badminton player (born 1999)

Andy Kwek 郭俊良
Personal information
- Born: Andy Kwek Jun Liang; 22 April 1999 (age 27) Singapore
- Height: 1.83 m (6 ft 0 in)

Sport
- Country: Singapore
- Sport: Badminton
- Coached by: Lim Pek Siah, Paulus Firnan

Men's & mixed doubles
- Highest ranking: 70 (MD with Loh Kean Hean (5 September 2023); 68 (XD with Crystal Wong 10 October 2023)
- BWF profile
Medal record
Men's badminton
Representing Singapore
Commonwealth Games
Bronze medal – third place	2022 Birmingham	Mixed team
Asia Team Championships
Bronze medal – third place	2022 Selangor	Men's team
SEA Games
Bronze medal – third place	2019 Philippines	Men's team
Bronze medal – third place	2021 Vietnam	Men's team
Bronze medal – third place	2023 Cambodia	Men's team

Andy Kwek Jun Liang (Chinese: 郭俊良; pinyin: Guō Jùnliáng; born 22 April 1999) is a Singaporean badminton player. He won a bronze medal for Singapore as part of the team at the 2022 Badminton Asia Team Championships and 2019, 2021 and also 2023 SEA Games. In 2022, Kwek won a title at the Swedish Open with his partner Danny Bawa Chrisnanta. Kwek and Chrisnanta also represented Singapore men's team at the 2022 Badminton Asia Team Championships and helped the team to secure a bronze medal.

Kwek competed in the 2022 Thomas Cup and the 2021 SEA Games. He was also part of the Singaporean mixed team squad that won bronze at the 2022 Commonwealth Games. In 2023, Kwek won the mixed doubles title at the Uganda International with Crystal Wong.

== Achievements ==
=== BWF International Challenge/Series (2 titles, 1 runner-up) ===
Men's doubles
Year	Tournament	Partner	Opponent	Score	Result
2022	Estonian International	(Singapore) Danny Bawa Chrisnanta	(Thailand) Ruttanapak Oupthong (Thailand) Sirawit Sothon	21–17, 17–21, 16–21	(silver) Runner-up
2022	Swedish Open	(Singapore) Danny Bawa Chrisnanta	(Malaysia) Chia Wei Jie (Malaysia) Low Hang Yee	21–13, 23–21	(gold) Winner

Mixed doubles
Year	Tournament	Partner	Opponent	Score	Result
2023	Uganda International	(Singapore) Crystal Wong	(Austria) Philipp Drexler (Austria) Serena Au Yeong	21–17, 21–19	(gold) Winner

BWF International Challenge tournament
BWF International Series tournament

=== BWF Junior International (1 title) ===
Boys' doubles
Year	Tournament	Partner	Opponent	Score	Result
2016	Singapore Youth International	(Singapore) Lee Jian Liang	(Chinese Taipei) Hu Chuan-en (Chinese Taipei) Liang Chun-ping	21–13, 8–21, 22–20	(gold) Winner

BWF Junior International Grand Prix tournament
BWF Junior International Challenge tournament
BWF Junior International Series tournament
BWF Junior Future Series tournament
