= Lee Shun Yang =

Malaysian badminton player

Lee Shun Yang 李洵扬
Personal information
- Born: 27 June 2001 (age 25) Penang, Malaysia
- Years active: 2017–present

Sport
- Country: Malaysia
- Sport: Badminton
- Handedness: Right

Men's singles
- Career record: 66 wins, 36 losses
- Highest ranking: 89 (6 June 2023)
- BWF profile
Medal record
Men's badminton
Representing Malaysia
SEA Games
Silver medal – second place	2021 Vietnam	Men's team
Silver medal – second place	2023 Cambodia	Men's team
Bronze medal – third place	2023 Cambodia	Men's singles

Lee Shun Yang
- Traditional Chinese: 李洵揚
- Simplified Chinese: 李洵扬
Transcriptions
Standard Mandarin
- Hanyu Pinyin: Lǐ Xúnyáng
Yue: Cantonese
- Jyutping: Lei5 Seon1 Joeng4
Southern Min
- Hokkien POJ: Lí Sûn-iông
- Tâi-lô: Lí Sûn-iông

Lee Shun Yang (Chinese: 李洵扬; pinyin: Lǐ Xúnyáng; born 27 June 2001) is a Malaysian badminton player. He is a triple medalist at the SEA Games, winning two silver medals in the men's team event in 2021 and 2023, as well as a bronze in the men's singles event in 2023.

== Career ==
Lee competed in the 2019 World Junior Championships in October, where he lost in the first round to Joakim Oldorff of Finland. In September 2021, he won his first senior title at the Hellas International. In January 2022, Lee reached the semi-finals of the Ukraine Open. A few months later, he helped the Malaysian men's team to clinch silver at the 2021 SEA Games.

In May 2023, Lee made his second appearance at the SEA Games. He won a second consecutive silver medal in the men's team event and a bronze medal in the men's singles event. After the SEA Games, Lee suffered four early-round exits throughout the second half of the year. He finished off the 2023 season by participating in the Malaysia International Challenge, losing to Riki Takei from Japan in the quarter-finals. Due to his gloomy results, he was dropped from the national team in December but was offered to become a full-time sparring partner for the national team players.

In 2024, Lee joined Lee Zii Jia's personal team, Team LZJ, as a sparring partner.

== Achievements ==
=== SEA Games ===
Men's singles

Year	Venue	Opponent	Score	Result
2023	Morodok Techo Badminton Hall, Phnom Penh, Cambodia	(Indonesia) Chico Aura Dwi Wardoyo	15–21, 18–21	Bronze

=== BWF International Challenge/Series (2 titles) ===
Men's singles

Year	Tournament	Opponent	Score	Result
2021	Hellas International	(Czech Republic) Jan Louda	21–14, 24–22	(gold) Winner
2025	Latvia International	(Chinese Taipei) Chiang Tzu-chieh	18–21, 21–16, 22–20	(gold) Winner

BWF International Challenge tournament
BWF International Series tournament
BWF Future Series tournament
