= Kok Jing Hong =

Malaysian badminton player (born 2002)

Kok Jing Hong 郭景宏
Personal information
- Born: Jacky Kok Jing Hong; 12 March 2002 (age 24) Kedah, Malaysia
- Years active: 2020–present

Sport
- Country: Malaysia
- Sport: Badminton
- Handedness: Left

Men's singles
- Highest ranking: 66 (13 January 2026)
- Current ranking: 93 (7 April 2026)
- BWF profile
Medal record
Men's badminton
Representing Malaysia
Asia Team Championships
Gold medal – first place	2022 Selangor	Men's team
SEA Games
Silver medal – second place	2021 Vietnam	Men's team
Silver medal – second place	2023 Cambodia	Men's team

Jacky Kok Jing Hong (Chinese: 郭景宏; pinyin: Guō Jǐnghóng; born 12 March 2002) is a Malaysian badminton player. In 2022, he won his first senior title at the Swedish Open.

== Career ==
=== 2016–2020: Junior career ===
In August 2016, Kok made his international debut at the Jakarta Junior International. He finished as the runner-up in the boys' singles U-15 event and reached the semi-final of the boys' doubles U-15 event.

In October 2017, he was the runner-up in the boys' doubles U-17 event with Ooi Jhy Dar at the Badminton Asia U-15 & U-17 Junior Championships. He also reached the semi-final of the boys' singles U-17 event. Less than a month later, he was crowned the boys' singles U-17 champion at the Korea Junior International.

In April 2018, Kok won the boys' singles U-17 title at the Jaya Raya Junior International. In December 2018, he finished as the men's singles U-19 runner-up at the Korea Junior International.

In 2020, Kok was promoted to the national team at the age 18 from the badminton team of Bukit Jalil Sports School. In March 2020, he competed at the German Junior International and won the men's singles U-19 title defeating Alvi Wijaya Chairullah in the final.

=== 2022 ===
In January, Kok managed to advance to the final at the Estonian International, but lost out to France's Alex Lanier. In the following week, he competed at the Swedish Open and won his first international title by walkover from compatriot Yeoh Seng Zoe. He was part of the men's team that earned Malaysia their first gold medal at the 2022 Badminton Asia Team Championships in February. In May, he made his debut at the 2021 SEA Games where he helped Malaysia win the silver medal in the men's team event.

=== 2023 ===
Kok made his second appearance at the SEA Games in 2023 as a replacement for Justin Hoh, who had to withdraw due to injuries. In the men's team event, he won the match that allowed the Malaysian team to advance to the final. The team ended the Games as the silver medallists after losing to Indonesia.

== Achievements ==
=== BWF International Challenge/Series (1 title, 2 runners-up) ===
Men's singles
Year	Tournament	Opponent	Score	Result
2022	Estonian International	(France) Alex Lanier	20–22, 15–21	(silver) Runner-up
2022	Swedish Open	(Malaysia) Yeoh Seng Zoe	Walkover	(gold) Winner
2025	Vietnam International	(Thailand) Puritat Arree	21–23, 21–17, 15–21	(silver) Runner-up

BWF International Challenge tournament
BWF International Series tournament

=== BWF Junior International (1 title, 1 runner-up) ===
Boys' singles
Year	Tournament	Opponent	Score	Result
2018	Korea Junior International	(South Korea) Jeong U-min	21–23, 14–21	(silver) Runner-up
2020	German Junior International	(Indonesia) Alvi Wijaya Chairullah	21–15, 21–15	(gold) Winner

BWF Junior International Grand Prix tournament
BWF Junior International Challenge tournament
