= Chia Wei Jie =

Malaysian badminton player (born 2000)

Chia Wei Jie 谢炜杰
Personal information
- Born: 3 January 2000 (age 26)

Sport
- Country: Malaysia
- Sport: Badminton
- Handedness: Right
- Coached by: Teo Kok Siang

Men's doubles
- Highest ranking: 36 (with Lwi Sheng Hao, 1 December 2025); 36 (with Teo Ee Yi, 10 November 2026); 63 (with Low Hang Yee, 22 November 2022); 71 (with Liew Xun, 17 October 2023)
- Current ranking: 36 (with Teo Ee Yi, 10 November 2026)
- BWF profile
Medal record
Men's badminton
Representing Malaysia
SEA Games
| Silver medal – second place | 2023 Cambodia | Men's team |
World Junior Championships
| Silver medal – second place | 2017 Yogyakarta | Mixed team |
Asian Junior Championships
| Bronze medal – third place | 2017 Jakarta | Boys' doubles |
| Bronze medal – third place | 2017 Jakarta | Mixed team |
| Bronze medal – third place | 2018 Jakarta | Mixed team |

Chia Wei Jie (simplified Chinese: 谢炜杰; traditional Chinese: 謝煒傑; pinyin: Xiè Wěijié, born 3 January 2000) is a Malaysian badminton player. A world junior team silver medalist, Asian junior championship bronze medalist and SEA Games men's team silver medalist, he contributed to Malaysia's silver medal in the mixed team event at the 2017 BWF World Junior Championships and won a bronze medal in boys' doubles at the 2017 Badminton Asia Junior Championships alongside Ng Tze Yong. At senior level, he won his first BWF World Tour title at the 2024 Guwahati Masters, a Super 100 tournament, alongside Lwi Sheng Hao.

Chia was part of the Malaysian men's team that won a silver medal at the 2023 SEA Games. During his junior career, he also contributed to Malaysia's mixed team bronze medals at the 2017 and 2018 Asian Junior Championships. After progressing to senior competition, he won the men's doubles title at the 2022 Ukraine Open with Low Hang Yee and subsequently partnered Liew Xun to reach the finals of the 2023 Mongolia International and Malaysia International.

Together with Lwi Sheng Hao, Chia won the 2024 Guwahati Masters by defeating China's Huang Di and Liu Yang in the final. They subsequently reached the finals of the 2025 Malaysia Super 100 and 2025 Syed Modi International, a BWF World Tour Super 300 tournament, finishing runners-up to fellow Malaysians Aaron Tai and Kang Khai Xing on both occasions. Chia and Lwi achieved a career-high men's doubles world ranking of number 38 on 16 June 2026.

In 2026, Chia formed a new men's doubles partnership with former world championship bronze medalist Teo Ee Yi, following the end of Teo's longstanding partnership with Ong Yew Sin. They made their international debut at the 2026 Thailand Open, defeating Indonesia's Muhammad Rian Ardianto and Rahmat Hidayat in the opening round.

== Career ==
=== 2017–2018 ===
In July 2017, Chia won the boys' doubles bronze medal with Ng Tze Yong at the 2017 Badminton Asia Junior Championships. He was also part of Malaysia's mixed team that won two consecutive bronze medals at the Badminton Asia Junior Championships in 2017 and 2018.

=== 2019–2021 ===
In November 2019, Chia partnered with Pearly Tan at the India International and became the runners-up. In March 2021, he partnered with Chang Yee Jun and earned the runner-up position at the Polish Open.

=== 2022 ===
In January, Chia and partner Low Hang Yee entered the final of the Swedish Open but lost out to Danny Bawa Chrisnanta and Andy Kwek. In the following week, they entered their second consecutive final and captured their first international title at the Ukraine Open. Following the good results with his partner, he was selected as a backup player for the Malaysian squad at the 2022 Thomas & Uber Cup.

=== 2023 ===
In May, Chia made his debut at the 2023 SEA Games where he helped Malaysia win a silver medal in the men's team event. He later on competed in the men's doubles event with Liew Xun but crashed out in the quarter-finals. In July, Chia and Liew entered their first final as a pair at the Mongolia International and finished as runners-up. In October, the pair reached the final of Malaysia International, losing out to teammates Fazriq Razif and Wong Vin Sean.

=== 2024 ===
Now a professional player, Chia and his new partner, Lwi Sheng Hao, participated in the Guwahati Masters in December. They clinched the title by defeating China's Huang Di and Liu Yang in the final.

== Achievements ==
=== Asian Junior Championships ===
Boys' doubles
| Year | Venue | Partner | Opponent | Score | Result |
|---|---|---|---|---|---|
| 2017 | Jaya Raya Sports Hall Training Center; Jakarta, Indonesia | (Malaysia) Ng Tze Yong | (China) Di Zijian (China) Wang Chang | 21–23, 13–21 | Bronze |

=== BWF World Tour (1 title, 2 runners-up) ===
The BWF World Tour, which was announced on 19 March 2017 and implemented in 2018, is a series of elite badminton tournaments sanctioned by the Badminton World Federation (BWF). The BWF World Tours are divided into levels of World Tour Finals, Super 1000, Super 750, Super 500, Super 300, and the BWF Tour Super 100.

Men's doubles
| Year | Tournament | Level | Partner | Opponent | Score | Result |
|---|---|---|---|---|---|---|
| 2024 | Guwahati Masters | Super 100 | (Malaysia) Lwi Sheng Hao | (China) Huang Di (China) Liu Yang | 20–22, 21–15, 21–17 | (gold) Winner |
| 2025 | Malaysia Super 100 | Super 100 | (Malaysia) Lwi Sheng Hao | (Malaysia) Kang Khai Xing (Malaysia) Aaron Tai | 18–21, 7–21 | (silver) Runner-up |
| 2025 | Syed Modi International | Super 300 | (Malaysia) Lwi Sheng Hao | (Malaysia) Kang Khai Xing (Malaysia) Aaron Tai | 9–21, 19–21 | (silver) Runner-up |

=== BWF International Challenge/Series (1 title, 5 runners-up) ===
Men's doubles
| Year | Tournament | Partner | Opponent | Score | Result |
|---|---|---|---|---|---|
| 2021 | Polish Open | (Malaysia) Chang Yee Jun | (Malaysia) Man Wei Chong (Malaysia) Tee Kai Wun | 17–21, 22–20, 19–21 | (silver) Runner-up |
| 2022 | Swedish Open | (Malaysia) Low Hang Yee | (Singapore) Danny Bawa Chrisnanta (Singapore) Andy Kwek | 13–21, 21–23 | (silver) Runner-up |
| 2022 | Ukraine Open | (Malaysia) Low Hang Yee | (Denmark) Emil Lauritzen (Denmark) Mads Vestergaard | 19–21, 22–20, 23–21 | (gold) Winner |
| 2023 | Mongolia International | (Malaysia) Liew Xun | (Malaysia) Low Hang Yee (Malaysia) Ng Eng Cheong | 17–21, 15–21 | (silver) Runner-up |
| 2023 | Malaysia International | (Malaysia) Liew Xun | (Malaysia) Fazriq Razif (Malaysia) Wong Vin Sean | 14–21, 16–21 | (silver) Runner-up |

Mixed doubles
| Year | Tournament | Partner | Opponent | Score | Result |
|---|---|---|---|---|---|
| 2019 | India International | (Malaysia) Pearly Tan | (Malaysia) Hoo Pang Ron (Malaysia) Cheah Yee See | 15–21, 15–21 | (silver) Runner-up |

BWF International Challenge tournament
BWF International Series tournament
BWF Future Series tournament
