= Badminton at the 2023 SEA Games =

Events at 2023 SEA Games

- Venue: Morodok Techo National Sports Complex
- Location: Phnom Penh
- Dates: 8–16 May 2023

The badminton competition at the 2023 SEA Games took place at Badminton Hall, Morodok Techo National Sports Complex in Phnom Penh, Cambodia from 8 to 16 May 2023. The game featured 8 events, two singles, 3 double and 3 team events.

== Medal table ==
* Host nation (Cambodia)

| Rank | Nation | Gold | Silver | Bronze | Total |
|---|---|---|---|---|---|
| 1 | Indonesia | 5 | 3 | 3 | 11 |
| 2 | Thailand | 2 | 2 | 3 | 7 |
| 3 | Cambodia* | 1 | 0 | 0 | 1 |
| 4 | Malaysia | 0 | 2 | 4 | 6 |
| 5 | Myanmar | 0 | 1 | 0 | 1 |
| 6 | Singapore | 0 | 0 | 3 | 3 |
| 7 | Brunei | 0 | 0 | 1 | 1 |
| 7 | Laos | 0 | 0 | 1 | 1 |
| 7 | Philippines | 0 | 0 | 1 | 1 |
| Totals (9 entries) | | 8 | 8 | 16 | 32 |

== Medalists ==
| Event | Gold | Silver | Bronze |
|---|---|---|---|
| Men's singles | Christian Adinata; Indonesia | Chico Aura Dwi Wardoyo; Indonesia | Lee Shun Yang; Malaysia |
| Men's singles | Christian Adinata; Indonesia | Chico Aura Dwi Wardoyo; Indonesia | Leong Jun Hao; Malaysia |
| Women's singles | Supanida Katethong; Thailand | Lalinrat Chaiwan; Thailand | Komang Ayu Cahya Dewi; Indonesia |
| Women's singles | Supanida Katethong; Thailand | Lalinrat Chaiwan; Thailand | Ester Nurumi Tri Wardoyo; Indonesia |
| Men's doubles | Indonesia; Pramudya Kusumawardana; Yeremia Rambitan | Thailand; Peeratchai Sukphun; Pakkapon Teeraratsakul | Indonesia; Muhammad Shohibul Fikri; Bagas Maulana |
| Men's doubles | Indonesia; Pramudya Kusumawardana; Yeremia Rambitan | Thailand; Peeratchai Sukphun; Pakkapon Teeraratsakul | Singapore; Nge Joo Jie; Johann Prajogo |
| Women's doubles | Indonesia; Febriana Dwipuji Kusuma; Amalia Cahaya Pratiwi | Indonesia; Meilysa Trias Puspita Sari; Rachel Allessya Rose | Malaysia; Lee Xin Jie; Low Yeen Yuan |
| Women's doubles | Indonesia; Febriana Dwipuji Kusuma; Amalia Cahaya Pratiwi | Indonesia; Meilysa Trias Puspita Sari; Rachel Allessya Rose | Malaysia; Cheng Su Hui; Cheng Su Yin |
| Mixed doubles | Indonesia; Rehan Naufal Kusharjanto; Lisa Ayu Kusumawati | Malaysia; Yap Roy King; Cheng Su Yin | Thailand; Ratchapol Makkasasithorn; Chasinee Korepap |
| Mixed doubles | Indonesia; Rehan Naufal Kusharjanto; Lisa Ayu Kusumawati | Malaysia; Yap Roy King; Cheng Su Yin | Thailand; Pakkapon Teeraratsakul; Phataimas Muenwong |
| Men's team | Indonesia; Christian Adinata; Chico Aura Dwi Wardoyo; Alwi Farhan; Muhammad Shohibul Fikri; Rehan Naufal Kusharjanto; Pramudya Kusumawardana; Bagas Maulana; Yeremia Rambitan; Zachariah Josiahno Sumanti | Malaysia; Beh Chun Meng; Chia Wei Jie; Choong Hon Jian; Goh Boon Zhe; Kok Jing Hong; Lee Shun Yang; Leong Jun Hao; Liew Xun; Ong Ken Yon; Yap Roy King | Singapore; Terry Hee; Joel Koh; Andy Kwek; Marcus Lau; Loh Kean Hean; Loh Kean Yew; Nge Joo Jie; Johann Prajogo; Jason Teh; Donovan Willard Wee |
| Men's team | Indonesia; Christian Adinata; Chico Aura Dwi Wardoyo; Alwi Farhan; Muhammad Shohibul Fikri; Rehan Naufal Kusharjanto; Pramudya Kusumawardana; Bagas Maulana; Yeremia Rambitan; Zachariah Josiahno Sumanti | Malaysia; Beh Chun Meng; Chia Wei Jie; Choong Hon Jian; Goh Boon Zhe; Kok Jing Hong; Lee Shun Yang; Leong Jun Hao; Liew Xun; Ong Ken Yon; Yap Roy King | Thailand; Chaloempon Charoenkitamorn; Saran Jamsri; Ratchapol Makkasasithorn; Ruttanapak Oupthong; Peeratchai Sukphun; Pakkapon Teeraratsakul; Panitchaphon Teeraratsakul; Sitthikom Thammasin; Parinyawat Thongnuam; Nanthakarn Yordphaisong |
| Women's team | Thailand; Benyapa Aimsaard; Nuntakarn Aimsaard; Lalinrat Chaiwan; Laksika Kanlaha; Supanida Katethong; Jongkolphan Kititharakul; Chasinee Korepap; Phataimas Muenwong; Pitchamon Opatniput; Rawinda Prajongjai | Indonesia; Komang Ayu Cahya Dewi; Hediana Julimarbela; Febriana Dwipuji Kusuma; Lisa Ayu Kusumawati; Amalia Cahaya Pratiwi; Meilysa Trias Puspita Sari; Mutiara Ayu Puspitasari; Rachel Allessya Rose; Ester Nurumi Tri Wardoyo; Stephanie Widjaja | Singapore; Grace Chua; Heng Xiao En; Insyirah Khan; Jin Yujia; Elsa Lai; Megan Lee; Jessica Tan; Crystal Wong; Yeo Jia Min |
| Women's team | Thailand; Benyapa Aimsaard; Nuntakarn Aimsaard; Lalinrat Chaiwan; Laksika Kanlaha; Supanida Katethong; Jongkolphan Kititharakul; Chasinee Korepap; Phataimas Muenwong; Pitchamon Opatniput; Rawinda Prajongjai | Indonesia; Komang Ayu Cahya Dewi; Hediana Julimarbela; Febriana Dwipuji Kusuma; Lisa Ayu Kusumawati; Amalia Cahaya Pratiwi; Meilysa Trias Puspita Sari; Mutiara Ayu Puspitasari; Rachel Allessya Rose; Ester Nurumi Tri Wardoyo; Stephanie Widjaja | Philippines; Nicole Albo; Bianca Carlos; Mikaela de Guzman; Christel Fuentespina; Eleanor Inlayo; Alyssa Leonardo; Thea Pomar; Susmita Ramos |
| Mixed team | Cambodia; Phon Chenda; Chheng Huy; Chea Lav; Kimloung Lim; Chourng Meng; Heng Mengleap; Sok Rikreay; Yam Samnang; Seavty Teav; Vannthoun Vath | Myanmar; Arkar Phone Myat; Aung Myo Htoo; Hein Htut; Thet Htar Thuzar; Twal Tar Oo; Zaw Lin Htoo; Zun Myo Thet | Brunei; Ahmad Mahyuddin Haji Abas; Mohammad Shahirul Jenin; Azri Safwan Jofri; Siti Marinah Salleh; Nuraqilah Shahroney; Woo Chang Huei |
| Mixed team | Cambodia; Phon Chenda; Chheng Huy; Chea Lav; Kimloung Lim; Chourng Meng; Heng Mengleap; Sok Rikreay; Yam Samnang; Seavty Teav; Vannthoun Vath | Myanmar; Arkar Phone Myat; Aung Myo Htoo; Hein Htut; Thet Htar Thuzar; Twal Tar Oo; Zaw Lin Htoo; Zun Myo Thet | Laos; Phoutsavanh Daopasith; Namboun Luangamath; Manut Phiasoulin; Phonesack Sokthavy; Thidachane Sypaseuth |

== Controversy ==
Throughout the history of badminton events at the SEA Games, this is the first time that there has been a restriction on participation for the mixed team event: the countries affected by this restriction are Indonesia, Malaysia, the Philippines, Singapore, Thailand, and Vietnam. However, this is also the first time the mixed team event has been contested.

Usually, badminton has seven gold medals in contention, with two medals from the men's and women's team events, and five from the individual events.

Bambang Roedyanto, a technical official for the games, claimed that “Cambodia [wanted] the opportunity to win medals from [badminton], so [the mixed team event] was held with countries [with developing badminton teams]”.

Cambodian badminton player Chourng Meng was revealed to be Chinese badminton player Zhou Meng, the runner-up of the girls' singles event at the 2019 BWF World Junior Championship: in a video that has gone viral, Chourng was suddenly pulled off the field by a man presumed to be a Cambodian official while celebrating her victory in the final. Apart from leaving the field early, Chourng was also absent from the mixed team medal ceremony.
