= Badminton at the 2023 SEA Games – Men's team =

Badminton – Men's team at the 2023 SEA Games
- Venue: Morodok Techo Badminton Hall
- Dates: 8–11 May 2023
- Nations: 7

Medalists
gold medal	Indonesia (INA)
silver medal	Malaysia (MAS)
bronze medal	Singapore (SGP)
bronze medal	Thailand (THA)

The men's team badminton tournament at the 2023 SEA Games was held from 8 to 11 May 2023 at the Morodok Techo Badminton Hall, Phnom Penh, Cambodia. Thailand men's team won the last edition of the men's team event.

== Schedule ==
All times are Cambodia Standard Time (UTC+07:00)

Date	Time	Event
Monday, 8 May	10:00	Quarter-final
Monday, 8 May	12:30	Quarter-final
Tuesday, 9 May	10:00	Quarter-final
Wednesday, 10 May	12:30	Semi-final
Thursday, 11 May	15:00	Gold medal match

== Bracket ==
Quarter-finals
3/4	Singapore (SGP)	3
Philippines (PHI)	1
Cambodia (CAM)	0
3/4	Thailand (THA)	3
Vietnam (VIE)	1
2	Malaysia (MAS)	3

Semi-finals
1	Indonesia (INA)	3
3/4	Singapore (SGP)	1
3/4	Thailand (THA)	2
2	Malaysia (MAS)	3

Final
1	Indonesia (INA)	3
2	Malaysia (MAS)	1

== Quarter-finals ==
=== Singapore vs Philippines ===
Singapore
3
Morodok Techo Badminton Hall - 1
8 May 2023 10:00 UTC+7

Philippines
1

			1	2	3
1	(Singapore) (Philippines)	Loh Kean Yew; Jewel Albo	21; 14	21; 13
2	(Singapore) (Philippines)	Andy Kwek / Loh Kean Hean; Christian Bernardo / Alvin Morada	14; 21	15; 21
3	(Singapore) (Philippines)	Jason Teh; Lance Vargas	21; 11	21; 11
4	(Singapore) (Philippines)	Terry Hee / Nge Joo Jie; Solomon Padiz Jr. / Julius Villabrille	13; 21	21; 19	21; 18
5	(Singapore) (Philippines)	Joel Koh; Mark Velasco				not played

=== Cambodia vs Thailand ===
Cambodia
0
Morodok Techo Badminton Hall - 1
8 May 2023 12:30 UTC+7

Thailand
3

			1	2	3
1	(Cambodia) (Thailand)	Vannthoun Vath; Sitthikom Thammasin	9; 21	10; 21
2	(Cambodia) (Thailand)	Heng Mengleap / Yam Samnang; Peeratchai Sukphun / Pakkapon Teeraratsakul	9; 21	6; 21
3	(Cambodia) (Thailand)	Sok Rikreay; Panitchaphon Teeraratsakul	19; 21	7; 21
4	(Cambodia) (Thailand)	Sorn Liza / Sophanith Reach; Ruttanapak Oupthong / Nanthakarn Yordphaisong				not played
5	(Cambodia) (Thailand)	Meng Ly Heng; Saran Jamsri				not played

=== Vietnam vs Malaysia ===
Vietnam
1
Morodok Techo Badminton Hall - 1
9 May 2023 10:00 UTC+7

Malaysia
3

			1	2	3
1	(Vietnam) (Malaysia)	Nguyễn Hải Đăng; Leong Jun Hao	14; 21	16; 21
2	(Vietnam) (Malaysia)	Nguyễn Đình Hoàng / Trần Đình Mạnh; Beh Chun Meng / Goh Boon Zhe	19; 21	14; 21
3	(Vietnam) (Malaysia)	Lê Đức Phát; Lee Shun Yang	21; 13	16; 21	21; 7
4	(Vietnam) (Malaysia)	Nguyễn Xuân Hưng / Phạm Văn Hải; Chia Wei Jie / Liew Xun	14; 21	18; 21
5	(Vietnam) (Malaysia)	Nguyễn Tiến Tuấn; Kok Jing Hong				not played

== Semi-finals ==
=== Indonesia vs Singapore ===
Indonesia
3
Morodok Techo Badminton Hall - 1
10 May 2023 12:30 UTC+7

Singapore
1

			1	2	3
1	(Indonesia) (Singapore)	Chico Aura Dwi Wardoyo; Loh Kean Yew	10; 21	21; 7	24; 22
2	(Indonesia) (Singapore)	Muhammad Shohibul Fikri / Bagas Maulana; Terry Hee / Loh Kean Hean	21; 15	21; 17
3	(Indonesia) (Singapore)	Christian Adinata; Jason Teh	21; 15	12; 21	14; 21
4	(Indonesia) (Singapore)	Pramudya Kusumawardana / Yeremia Rambitan; Nge Joo Jie / Johann Prajogo	21; 18	21; 16
5	(Indonesia) (Singapore)	Alwi Farhan; Joel Koh				not played

=== Thailand vs Malaysia ===
Thailand
2
Morodok Techo Badminton Hall - 2
10 May 2023 12:30 UTC+7

Malaysia
3

			1	2	3
1	(Thailand) (Malaysia)	Sitthikom Thammasin; Leong Jun Hao	13; 21	21; 18	10; 21
2	(Thailand) (Malaysia)	Peeratchai Sukphun / Pakkapon Teeraratsakul; Beh Chun Meng / Goh Boon Zhe	16; 21	21; 14	15; 21
3	(Thailand) (Malaysia)	Panitchaphon Teeraratsakul; Ong Ken Yon	21; 17	21; 15
4	(Thailand) (Malaysia)	Ruttanapak Oupthong / Nanthakarn Yordphaisong; Chia Wei Jie / Liew Xun	21; 16	21; 14
5	(Thailand) (Malaysia)	Saran Jamsri; Kok Jing Hong	12; 21	13; 21

== Finals ==
=== Indonesia vs Malaysia ===
Indonesia
3
Morodok Techo Badminton Hall - 1
11 May 2023 15:00 UTC+7

Malaysia
1

			1	2	3
1	(Indonesia) (Malaysia)	Chico Aura Dwi Wardoyo; Leong Jun Hao	16; 21	13; 21
2	(Indonesia) (Malaysia)	Muhammad Shohibul Fikri / Bagas Maulana; Beh Chun Meng / Goh Boon Zhe	21; 12	22; 20
3	(Indonesia) (Malaysia)	Christian Adinata; Lee Shun Yang	21; 17	21; 9
4	(Indonesia) (Malaysia)	Pramudya Kusumawardana / Yeremia Rambitan; Chia Wei Jie / Liew Xun	13; 21	21; 16	21; 16
5	(Indonesia) (Malaysia)	Alwi Farhan; Kok Jing Hong				not played

== See also ==
- Individual event tournament
- Women's team tournament
- Mixed team tournament
