= Maldives International =

International badminton championship

The Maldives International is an open international badminton tournament in Maldives organized by the Badminton Association of Maldives and sanctioned by the Badminton Asia Confederation and Badminton World Federation. This tournament has been an International Challenge level before it went into hiatus in 2014. This tournament held at the Malé sports complex, and offered world ranking points with total prize money US$15,000.

In 2010, India won two titles from the men's and women's singles event. Anand Pawar won the men's singles title after defeated Dinuka Karunaratne of Sri Lanka with the score 21–14, 21–18, while his compatriot Trupti Murgunde won the women's singles title after Ann Venice Alcala Malvinne of Philippines retired with a hamstring injury at the score 21–10, 11–3. The men's doubles title goes to Pakistani Kashif Ali Sulehri and Rizwan Azam, and the Japanese pair Chinami Okui and Yukie Sumida won the women's doubles title. Kennevic Asuncion and Karyn Velez won the mixed doubles title outlasted Sri Lanka's Udara Nayanajith and Renu Chandrika Hettiarachchige, 24–22, 17–21, 21–13.

In 2011, Pablo Abián of Spain with his fast movement on the court, excellent physics, and speed of strokes won the men's singles title. The 15 years old, P. V. Sindhu produced a stunning performance to win the women's singles title. She beat Carolina Marín in the third round and Agnese Allegrini in the semi-final. The men's, women's, and mixed doubles title goes to Singapore (Ashton Chen Yong Zhao and Derek Wong Zi Liang), Japan (Miki Komori and Nao Miyoshi) and Canada (Toby Ng and Grace Gao) respectively.

In 2012, K. Srikanth emerged as the title winner by ending the men's singles final set in three games with a margin of 13–21, 21–11 and 21–16 of Zulfadli Zulkiffli. Japan won three titles from the women's singles, men's doubles and women's doubles event. Raj Popat of Wales and Devi Tika Permatasari of Indonesia emerged as the winner of the mixed doubles title after defeating Sri Lanka’s Hasitha Chanaka and Kavindi Ishandika Sirimannage.

In 2013, Indonesia managed to put 6 representatives in the final round, and won two titles in the men's singles and women's doubles event after created All Indonesian finals. Hanna Ramadini lost to Michelle Li of Canada in the women's singles final and Arya Maulana Aldiartama/Alfian Eko Prasetya defeated by the Taiwanese pair Tien Tzu-chieh and Wang Chi-lin. Indian pair K. Nandagopal and Maneesha Kukkapalli clinched the mixed doubles title after registering a straight-game victory over Kim Dae-sung and Oh Bo-kyung of South Korea.

== Previous winners ==
=== Maldives International Challenge ===
Year	Men's singles	Women's singles	Men's doubles	Women's doubles	Mixed doubles
2010	(India) Anand Pawar	(India) Trupti Murgunde	(Pakistan) Kashif Ali Sulehri (Pakistan) Rizwan Azam	(Japan) Chinami Okui (Japan) Yukie Sumida	(Philippines) Kennevic Asuncion (United States) Karyn Velez
2011	(Spain) Pablo Abián	(India) P. V. Sindhu	(Singapore) Ashton Chen Yong Zhao (Singapore) Derek Wong	(Japan) Miki Komori (Japan) Nao Miyoshi	(Canada) Toby Ng (Canada) Grace Gao
2012	(India) Srikanth Kidambi	(Japan) Sayaka Takahashi	(Japan) Kazuya Itani (Japan) Tomoya Takashina	(Japan) Naoko Fukuman (Japan) Kurumi Yonao	(Wales) Raj Popat (Indonesia) Devi Tika Permatasari
2013	(Indonesia) Fikri Ihsandi Hadmadi	(Canada) Michelle Li	(Chinese Taipei) Tien Tzu-chieh (Chinese Taipei) Wang Chi-lin	(Indonesia) Maretha Dea Giovani (Indonesia) Melvira Oklamona	(India) Nandagopal Kidambi (India) Maneesha Kukkapalli
2014– 2018	No competition				
2019	(India) Kaushal Dharmamer	(United States) Iris Wang	(Japan) Keiichiro Matsui (Japan) Yoshinori Takeuchi	(Japan) Sayaka Hobara (Japan) Natsuki Sone	(Thailand) Chaloempon Charoenkitamorn (Thailand) Chasinee Korepap
2020	Cancelled (Note: This tournament, originally to be played from 22 to 27 September, was later cancelled due to the COVID-19 pandemic in Maldives.)				
2021	Cancelled (Note: This tournament, originally to be played from 15 to 21 March, was later cancelled due to the COVID-19 pandemic in Maldives.)				
2022	(Spain) Luís Enrique Peñalver	(India) Aakarshi Kashyap	(India) Rohan Kapoor (India) B. Sumeeth Reddy	(Japan) Chisato Hoshi (Japan) Miyu Takahashi	(India) Rohan Kapoor (India) N. Sikki Reddy
2023	(India) Ravi	(India) Ashmita Chaliha	(Thailand) Pharanyu Kaosamaang (Thailand) Worrapol Thongsa-nga	(Thailand) Laksika Kanlaha (Thailand) Phataimas Muenwong	(Malaysia) Hoo Pang Ron (Malaysia) Teoh Mei Xing
2024	Cancelled (Note: This tournament, originally to be played from 12 to 18 August, was later cancelled.)				

=== Maldives International Series ===
Year	Men's singles	Women's singles	Men's doubles	Women's doubles	Mixed doubles
2021	Cancelled (Note: This tournament, originally to be played from 11 to 17 October, was later cancelled due to the COVID-19 pandemic in Maldives.)				
2022	No competition				
2023	(Indonesia) Krishna Adi Nugraha	(Japan) Sorano Yoshikawa	(Malaysia) Choi Jian Sheng (Malaysia) Bryan Goonting	(Malaysia) Ho Lo Ee (Malaysia) Amanda Yap	(India) Sathish Kumar Karunakaran (India) Aadya Variyath
2024	No competition				

=== Maldives Future Series ===
Year	Men's singles	Women's singles	Men's doubles	Women's doubles	Mixed doubles
2019	(Thailand) Kantawat Leelavechabutr	(India) Malvika Bansod	(India) Vaibhaav (India) Prakash Raj	(Chinese Taipei) Kuo Yu-wen (Chinese Taipei) Lin Wan-ching	(Chinese Taipei) Lu Chia-pin (Chinese Taipei) Lin Wan-ching
2020	Cancelled (Note: This tournament, originally to be played from 15 to 20 September, was later cancelled due to the COVID-19 pandemic in Maldives.)				
2021	Cancelled (Note: This tournament, originally to be played from 4 to 10 October, was later cancelled due to the COVID-19 pandemic in Maldives.)				
2022– 2024	No competition				

== Performances by nation ==
=== Maldives International Challenge ===
As of the 2023 edition

Pos	Nation	MS	WS	MD	WD	XD	Total
1	India	4	4	1	0	2	11
2	Japan	0	1	2	5	0	8
3	Thailand	0	0	1	1	1	3
4	Indonesia	1	0	0	1	0.5	2.5
5	Canada	0	1	0	0	1	2
5	Spain	2	0	0	0	0	2
7	United States	0	1	0	0	0.5	1.5
8	Chinese Taipei	0	0	1	0	0	1
8	Malaysia	0	0	0	0	1	1
8	Pakistan	0	0	1	0	0	1
8	Singapore	0	0	1	0	0	1
12	Philippines	0	0	0	0	0.5	0.5
12	Wales	0	0	0	0	0.5	0.5
Total		7	7	7	7	7	35

=== Maldives International Series ===
As of the 2023 edition

Pos	Nation	MS	WS	MD	WD	XD	Total
1	Malaysia	0	0	1	1	0	2
2	India	0	0	0	0	1	1
2	Indonesia	1	0	0	0	0	1
2	Japan	0	1	0	0	0	1
Total		1	1	1	1	1	5

=== Maldives Future Series ===
As of the 2019 edition

Pos	Nation	MS	WS	MD	WD	XD	Total
1	Chinese Taipei	0	0	0	1	1	2
1	India	0	1	1	0	0	2
3	Thailand	1	0	0	0	0	1
Total		1	1	1	1	1	5
