= Lanny Tria Mayasari =

Indonesian badminton player (born 2002)

Personal information
- Born: 8 May 2002 (age 24) Sleman, SR Yogyakarta, Indonesia

Sport
- Country: Indonesia
- Sport: Badminton
- Handedness: Right

Women's doubles
- Highest ranking: 13 (with Siti Fadia Silva Ramadhanti, 2 September 2025); 25 (with Ribka Sugiarto, 10 October 2023)
- Current ranking: 41 (with Siti Fadia Silva Ramadhanti); 54 (with Amallia Cahaya Pratiwi) (17 February 2026)
- BWF profile
Medal record
Women's badminton
Representing Indonesia
Sudirman Cup
Bronze medal – third place	2025 Xiamen	Mixed team
Uber Cup
Silver medal – second place	2024 Chengdu	Women's team
Asia Mixed Team Championships
Gold medal – first place	2025 Qingdao	Mixed team
Asia Team Championships
Gold medal – first place	2022 Selangor	Women's team
Bronze medal – third place	2024 Selangor	Women's team

Lanny Tria Mayasari (born 8 May 2002) is an Indonesian badminton player affiliated with Jaya Raya Satria Yogyakarta club. She was part of the Indonesian women's winning team at the 2022 Asia Team Championships.

== Career ==
Mayasari won her first international title at the 2018 Jakarta Open Junior International Championships in the U-17 girls' doubles event partnered with Tryola Nadia. She made her debut in the BWF World Tour in the 2018 Bangka Belitung Indonesia Masters, but she had to suffer defeat in the early round.

In February 2020, Mayasari advanced to the finals of the Italian Junior International in both girls' and mixed doubles events, but the tournament was canceled due to the outbreak of COVID-19 in Italy. She then took part at the Dutch Junior International, and won the girls' doubles event with Jesita Putri Miantoro.

=== 2022 ===
She was selected to join the national team participated in the 2022 Asia Team Championships and Uber Cup, and the team won the Asia title after beating South Korea in the final. In the Uber Cup, the team was stopped in the quarter-finals to China. Mayasari and Miantoro then reached the finals in the senior tournament, Bonn International, and had to finished the tournament as runner-up. In July, they lost in the first round of the Singapore Open from 5th seed Chinese pair Zhang Shuxian and Zheng Yu.

In October, Mayasari was paired with Ribka Sugiarto and lost in the second round of 2022 Vietnam Open, but won the Malang Indonesia International, her first senior title. In December, Mayasari and Sugiarto won their second titles at the Bahrain International Challenge.

=== 2023 ===
Mayasari and her partner, Ribka Sugiarto, started the BWF tour in the home tournament, Indonesia Masters, but lost in the second round from Indian pair Tanisha Crasto and Ashwini Ponnappa. In the next tournament, they lost in the quarter-finals of the Thailand Masters from Korean pair Baek Ha-na and Lee So-hee.

In February, Mayasari join the Indonesia national badminton team to compete at the Badminton Asia Mixed Team Championships, but unfortunately the teams lost in the quarter-finals from team Korea.

In March, Mayasari and Sugiarto competed in the European tour at the Swiss Open but lost in the first round from fellow Indonesian pair Febriana Dwipuji Kusuma and Amalia Cahaya Pratiwi. In the next tour, they competed in the Spain Masters, but had to lose in the first round again from Thai pair Supissara Paewsampran and Puttita Supajirakul.

In April, Mayasari and Sugiarto competed at the Orléans Masters in France, but had to lose in the semi-finals from Chinese youngster pair Liu Shengshu and Tan Ning. In late April, they competed at the Asian Championships in Dubai, United Arab Emirates, but had to lose in the first round from Indian pair Treesa Jolly and Gayatri Gopichand.

In May, Mayasari alongside the Indonesian team competed at the 2023 Sudirman Cup in Suzhou, China. She played a match in the group stage, won against Catherine Choi and Michelle Li of Canada. Indonesia advanced to the knockout stage but lost at the quarterfinals against China. In the following week, Mayasari and Sugiarto competed in the second Asian Tour at the Malaysia Masters. Unfortunately, they lost in the first round from Korean pair Baek Ha-na and Lee So-hee. In the next tour, they lost in the second round of the Thailand Open from 1st seed Korean pair Kim So-yeong and Kong Hee-yong.

In June, Mayasari and Sugiarto competed at the Singapore Open, but lost in the first round from fellow Indonesian pair Febriana Dwipuji Kusuma and Amalia Cahaya Pratiwi. In the next tour, they competed at the home tournament, Indonesia Open, but lost in the first round from fellow Indonesian pair Febriana Dwipuji Kusuma and Amalia Cahaya Pratiwi for second consecutive tournament and third time which makes their head to head became 3–1.

In late August, Mayasari and Sugiarto competed at the World Championships, but lost in the second round from 1st seed Chinese pair and defending world champions Chen Qingchen and Jia Yifan.

=== 2024 ===
She was selected as a member of the Indonesian women's team at the Asia Team Championships in February, and the Uber Cup in May, where the team won a bronze medal at the Asian Championships, and then made history by reaching the final at the Uber Cup since 2008. In the final Indonesia lost to China 0–3.

== Achievements ==
=== BWF World Tour (4 titles, 1 runner-up) ===
The BWF World Tour, which was announced on 19 March 2017 and implemented in 2018, is a series of elite badminton tournaments sanctioned by the Badminton World Federation (BWF). The BWF World Tours are divided into levels of World Tour Finals, Super 1000, Super 750, Super 500, Super 300, and the BWF Tour Super 100.

Women's doubles
Year	Tournament	Level	Partner	Opponent	Score	Result	Ref.
2023 (I)	Indonesia Masters	Super 100	(Indonesia) Ribka Sugiarto	(Chinese Taipei) Chang Ching-hui (Chinese Taipei) Yang Ching-tun	22–20, 21–10	(gold) Winner	
2023 (II)	Indonesia Masters	Super 100	(Indonesia) Ribka Sugiarto	(Indonesia) Meilysa Trias Puspita Sari (Indonesia) Rachel Allessya Rose	21–12, 21–16	(gold) Winner	
2024	Swiss Open	Super 300	(Indonesia) Ribka Sugiarto	(Chinese Taipei) Hsu Ya-ching (Chinese Taipei) Lin Wan-ching	13–21, 21–16, 21–8	(gold) Winner	
2024 (II)	Indonesia Masters	Super 100	(Indonesia) Siti Fadia Silva Ramadhanti	(Chinese Taipei) Hsieh Pei-shan (Chinese Taipei) Hung En-tzu	19–21, 15–21	(silver) Runner-up	
2025	Thailand Masters	Super 300	(Indonesia) Siti Fadia Silva Ramadhanti	(Thailand) Laksika Kanlaha (Thailand) Phataimas Muenwong	15–21, 21–13, 21–8	(gold) Winner	

=== BWF International Challenge/Series (4 titles, 2 runners-up) ===
Women's doubles
Year	Tournament	Partner	Opponent	Score	Result	Ref.
2022	Bonn International	(Indonesia) Jesita Putri Miantoro	(Chinese Taipei) Hsu Ya-ching (Chinese Taipei) Lin Wan-ching	19–21, 21–12, 16–21	(silver) Runner-up	
2022 (II)	Indonesia International	(Indonesia) Ribka Sugiarto	(Japan) Sayaka Hobara (Japan) Hinata Suzuki	21–16, 21–18	(gold) Winner	
2022	Bahrain International	(Indonesia) Ribka Sugiarto	(India) Treesa Jolly (India) Gayatri Gopichand	21–18, 21–16	(gold) Winner	
2024 (II)	Indonesia International	(Indonesia) Siti Fadia Silva Ramadhanti	(Chinese Taipei) Hsieh Pei-shan (Chinese Taipei) Hung En-tzu	21–9, 21–16	(gold) Winner	
2025	Astana International	(Indonesia) Amallia Cahaya Pratiwi	(Ukraine) Polina Buhrova (Ukraine) Yevheniia Kantemyr	12–21, 21–11, 13–21	(silver) Runner-up	
2026 (III)	Indonesia International	(Indonesia) Ester Nurumi Tri Wardoyo	(Malaysia) Cheng Su Hui (Malaysia) Chong Jie Yu	21–9, 22–20	(gold) Winner	

BWF International Challenge tournament
BWF International Series tournament
BWF Future Series tournament

=== BWF Junior International (1 title) ===
Girls' doubles
Year	Tournament	Partner	Opponent	Score	Result	Ref.
2020	Dutch Junior International	(Indonesia) Jesita Putri Miantoro	(South Korea) Kim Min-sol (South Korea) Yoo A-yeon	21–10, 21–10	(gold) Winner	

BWF Junior International Grand Prix tournament
BWF Junior International Challenge tournament
BWF Junior International Series tournament
BWF Junior Future Series tournament

== Performance timeline ==
Key

W	Won	F	Finalist	SF	Semi-finalist
QF	Quarter-finalist	#R	Rounds 4, 3, 2, 1	RR	Round-robin stage
Q#	Qualification round	A	Absent	w/d	Withdrew
G	Gold	S	Silver	B	Bronze
NH	Not held	N/A	Not applicable	DNQ	Did not qualify

=== National team ===
- Senior level

Team events	2022	2023	2024	2025	Ref
Asia Team Championships	G	NH	B	NH	
Asia Mixed Team Championships	NH	QF	NH	G	
Uber Cup	QF	NH	S	NH	
Sudirman Cup	NH	QF	NH	B	

=== Individual competitions ===
==== Senior level ====
===== Women's doubles =====
Events	2023	2024	2025	Ref
Asian Championships	1R	1R	1R	
World Championships	2R	NH	3R	

Tournament	BWF World Tour									Best	Ref
Tournament	2018	2019	2020	2021	2022	2023	2024	2025	2026	Best	Ref
Malaysia Open	A		NH		A			QF	A	QF ('25)	
India Open	A		NH		A				1R	1R ('26)	
Indonesia Masters	A					2R	SF	1R	SF	SF ('24, '26)	
Thailand Masters	A			NH		QF	2R	W	2R	W ('25)	
German Open	A		NH		A				2R	2R ('26)	
Ruichang China Masters	A		NH			A			SF	SF ('26)	
Swiss Open	A		NH	A		1R	W	A		W ('24)	
Orléans Masters	A		NH	A		SF	QF	A		SF ('23)	
Thailand Open	A			NH	A	2R	w/d	2R	1R	2R ('23, '25)	
Malaysia Masters	A			NH	A	1R	A	QF	2R	QF ('25)	
Singapore Open	A		NH		1R	1R	A			1R ('22, '23)	
Indonesia Open	A		NH	A		1R	A	2R	1R	2R ('25)	
Australian Open	A		NH		2R	A		2R	A	2R ('22, '25)	
Macau Open	A		NH				A		1R	1R ('26)	
Japan Open	A		NH		A			QF	A	QF ('25)	
China Open	A		NH			A		w/d	A	—	
Taipei Open	A		NH		A	w/d	2R	A		2R ('24)	
China Masters	A		NH			A	1R	1R	A	1R ('24, '25)	
Indonesia Masters Super 100	1R	1R	NH		QF	W	QF	A	QF	W ('23^{I}, '23^{II})	
Indonesia Masters Super 100	1R	1R	NH		QF	W	F	A	QF	W ('23^{I}, '23^{II})	
Vietnam Open	A		NH		2R	A				2R ('22)	
Arctic Open	N/A		NH			A		1R	A	1R ('25)	
Denmark Open	A							1R	A	1R ('25)	
Malaysia Super 100	N/A					A			2R	2R ('26)	
French Open	A		NH	A				2R	A	2R ('25)	
Japan Masters	NH					A	1R	A		1R ('24)	
Kaohsiung Masters	NH					A	QF	A		QF ('24)	
Hong Kong Open	A		NH			A		2R		2R ('25)	
Odisha Masters	NH				A			QF		QF ('25)	
Spain Masters	A				NH	1R	A	NH		1R ('23)	
Year-end ranking	616	346	333	460	74	30	52	17		13	
Tournament	2018	2019	2020	2021	2022	2023	2024	2025	2026	Best	Ref

===== Mixed doubles =====
Tournament	BWF World Tour								Best	Ref
Tournament	2019	2020	2021	2022	2023	2024	2025	2026	Best	Ref
Ruichang China Masters	A	NH			A			Q2	Q2 ('26)	
Indonesia Masters Super 100	1R	NH		A					1R ('19)	
Year-end ranking	420	403	452	—N/a	—N/a	—N/a	—N/a		403	
Tournament	2019	2020	2021	2022	2023	2024	2025	2026	Best	Ref
