= 2025 Australian Open (badminton) =

2025 badminton tournament in Sydney

Tournament details
- Dates: 18–23 November
- Edition: 34th
- Level: Super 500
- Total prize money: US$475,000
- Venue: State Sports Centre
- Location: Sydney, Australia

Champions
- Men's singles: (India) Lakshya Sen
- Women's singles: (South Korea) An Se-young
- Men's doubles: (Indonesia) Raymond Indra (Indonesia) Nikolaus Joaquin
- Women's doubles: (Indonesia) Rachel Allessya Rose (Indonesia) Febi Setianingrum
- Mixed doubles: (Malaysia) Chen Tang Jie (Malaysia) Toh Ee Wei

The 2025 Australian Open (officially known as the Sathio Group Australian Open 2025 for sponsorship reasons) was a badminton tournament which took place at the State Sports Centre in Sydney, Australia, from 18 to 23 November 2025 and had a total prize of US$ 475,000.

== Tournament ==
The 2025 Australian Open was the thirty-sixth tournament in the 2025 BWF World Tour. It was a part of the Australian Open, which had been held since 1975. This tournament was organized by Badminton Australia with sanction from the BWF.

The BWF's Time Clock system was trialled at the tournament, with its use limited to qualifying matches. Under the regulations, the clock started when the umpire updated the score, and players had 25 seconds to be ready to serve or receive. Umpires retained discretion to allow additional time in circumstances such as medical intervention or extended court mopping.

=== Venue ===
This international tournament was held at the State Sports Centre in Sydney, Australia.

=== Point distribution ===
Below is the point distribution table for each phase of the tournament based on the BWF points system for the BWF World Tour Super 500 event.

| Winner | Runner-up | 3/4 | 5/8 | 9/16 | 17/32 | 33/64 | 65/128 |
|---|---|---|---|---|---|---|---|
| 9,200 | 7,800 | 6,420 | 5,040 | 3,600 | 2,220 | 880 | 430 |

=== Prize money ===
The total prize money for this tournament was US$475,000. The distribution of the prize money will be in accordance with BWF regulations.

| Event | Winner | Finalist | Semi-finals | Quarter-finals | Last 16 |
| Singles | $35,625 | $18,050 | $6,887.50 | $2,850 | $1662.50 |
| Doubles | $37,525 | $18,050 | $6,650 | $3,443.75 | $1781.25 |

== Men's singles ==
=== Seeds ===
1. (Indonesia) Jonatan Christie (first round)
2. (Chinese Taipei) Chou Tien-chen (semi-finals)
3. (Singapore) Loh Kean Yew (withdrew)
4. (Japan) Kodai Naraoka (second round)
5. (Chinese Taipei) Lin Chun-yi (semi-finals)
6. (Japan) Kenta Nishimoto (second round)
7. (India) Lakshya Sen (champion)
8. (Indonesia) Alwi Farhan (quarter-finals)

=== Finals ===
Semi-finals
(Japan) Yushi Tanaka | 21 | 21
5 | (Chinese Taipei) Lin Chun-yi | 18 | 15
7 | (India) Lakshya Sen | 17 | 24 | 21
2 | (Chinese Taipei) Chou Tien-chen | 21 | 22 | 16

Final
(Japan) Yushi Tanaka | 15 | 11
7 | (India) Lakshya Sen | 21 | 21

=== Top half ===
==== Section 1 ====
First round
1 | (Indonesia) J Christie | 17 | 7
(Japan) Y Tanaka | 21 | 21
(Malaysia) Aidil S | 21 | 21
PFQ | (Malaysia) E Ewe | 15 | 12
6 | (Japan) K Nishimoto | 11 | 24 | 21
(India) K George | 21 | 22 | 17
(Denmark) R Gemke | 21 | 24
(Japan) K Watanabe | 16 | 22

Second round
(Japan) Y Tanaka | 21 | 21
(Malaysia) Aidil S | 15 | 12
6 | (Japan) K Nishimoto | 17 | 9
(Denmark) R Gemke | 21 | 21

Quarter-finals
(Japan) Y Tanaka | 22 | 21
(Denmark) R Gemke | 20 | 13

==== Section 2 ====
First round
5 | (Chinese Taipei) Lin C-y | 21 | 21
(Thailand) Pan Teeraratsakul | 14 | 14
(India) T Mannepalli | 21 | 17 | 21
(Denmark) M Johannesen | 13 | 21 | 19
SWM | (Chinese Taipei) Lee C-h | 19 | 21 | 15
(India) S Kidambi | 21 | 19 | 21
(Japan) S Ogawa | 21 | 16 | 21
PFQ | (New Zealand) E Lau | 16 | 21 | 10

Second round
5 | (Chinese Taipei) Lin C-y | 21 | 19 | 21
(India) T Mannepalli | 13 | 21 | 10
(India) S Kidambi | 20 | 16
(Japan) S Ogawa | 22 | 21

Quarter-finals
5 | (Chinese Taipei) Lin C-y | 21 | 21
(Japan) S Ogawa | 17 | 10

=== Bottom half ===
==== Section 3 ====
First round
(Chinese Taipei) Chi Y-j | 21 | 19 | 21
(Chinese Taipei) Wang T-w | 19 | 21 | 11
(Chinese Taipei) Su L-y | 17 | 13
7 | (India) L Sen | 21 | 21
(India) A Shetty | 21 | 21
PFQ | (Canada) S Yuan | 11 | 15
PFQ | (Canada) XD Sheng | 14 | 16
4 | (Japan) K Naraoka | 21 | 21

Second round
(Chinese Taipei) Chi Y-j | 17 | 21 | 13
7 | (India) L Sen | 21 | 13 | 21
(India) A Shetty | 21 | 21
4 | (Japan) K Naraoka | 17 | 16

Quarter-finals
7 | (India) L Sen | 23 | 21
(India) A Shetty | 21 | 11

==== Section 4 ====
First round
PFQ | (Indonesia) Y Marcellyno | 21 | 12 | 17
(India) Prannoy H. S. | 6 | 21 | 21
Q4 | (Australia) Chan J Y
8 | (Indonesia) A Farhan | w | / | o
Q1 | (Australia) A Ooi | 21 | 21
Q3 | (Australia) J Lim | 10 | 4
Q2 | (Australia) R Tang | 8 | 10
2 | (Chinese Taipei) Chou T-c | 21 | 21

Second round
(India) Prannoy H. S. | 19 | 10
8 | (Indonesia) A Farhan | 21 | 21
Q1 | (Australia) A Ooi | 12 | 10
2 | (Chinese Taipei) Chou T-c | 21 | 21

Quarter-finals
8 | (Indonesia) A Farhan | 21 | 21 | 16
2 | (Chinese Taipei) Chou T-c | 13 | 23 | 21

== Women's singles ==
=== Seeds ===
1. (South Korea) An Se-young (champion)
2. (Indonesia) Putri Kusuma Wardani (final)
3. (Japan) Tomoka Miyazaki (withdrew)
4. (Thailand) Ratchanok Intanon (semi-finals)
5. (Indonesia) Gregoria Mariska Tunjung (withdrew)
6. (Thailand) Supanida Katethong (quarter-finals)
7. (Canada) Michelle Li (semi-finals)
8. (Thailand) Busanan Ongbamrungphan (second round)

=== Finals ===
Semi-finals
1 | (South Korea) An Se-young | 21 | 21
4 | (Thailand) Ratchanok Intanon | 8 | 6
7 | (Canada) Michelle Li | 21 | 16 | 18
2 | (Indonesia) Putri Kusuma Wardani | 17 | 21 | 21

Final
1 | (South Korea) An Se-young | 21 | 21
2 | (Indonesia) Putri Kusuma Wardani | 16 | 14

=== Top half ===
==== Section 1 ====
First round
1 | (South Korea) An S-y | 21 | 21
PFQ | (New Zealand) S Li | 6 | 6
(Chinese Taipei) Tung C-t | 21 | 21
(Chinese Taipei) Hsieh Y-e | 7 | 10
8 | (Thailand) B Ongbamrungphan | 21 | 21
PFQ | (Australia) F Huo | 8 | 6
Q2 | (Australia) S Tjonadi | 11 | 7
(Japan) M Suizu | 21 | 21

Second round
1 | (South Korea) An S-y | 21 | 21
(Chinese Taipei) Tung C-t | 7 | 5
8 | (Thailand) B Ongbamrungphan | 7 | 16
(Japan) M Suizu | 21 | 21

Quarter-finals
1 | (South Korea) An S-y | 21 | 21
(Japan) M Suizu | 10 | 8

==== Section 2 ====
First round
4 | (Thailand) R Intanon | 21 | 21
Q3 | (Canada) J Dent | 10 | 6
(France) R Cloteaux-Foucault | 13 | 16
(Australia) T Ho | 21 | 21
6 | (Thailand) S Katethong | 21 | 16 | 21
(Malaysia) Letshanaa K | 18 | 21 | 18
(Chinese Taipei) Huang Y-h | 21 | 21
Q4 | (Australia) S Adepu | 10 | 7

Second round
4 | (Thailand) R Intanon | 21 | 21
(Australia) T Ho | 7 | 10
6 | (Thailand) S Katethong | 21 | 22
(Chinese Taipei) Huang Y-h | 17 | 20

Quarter-finals
4 | (Thailand) R Intanon | 17 | 21 | 23
6 | (Thailand) S Katethong | 21 | 11 | 21

=== Bottom half ===
==== Section 3 ====
First round
PFQ | (Australia) B Teoh | 12 | 11
PFQ | (Australia) S Kawakami | 21 | 21
(Chinese Taipei) Lin H-t | 25 | 21
SWM | (Vietnam) Nguyễn T L | 23 | 13
(Malaysia) Wong L C | 21 | 21
Q1 | (New Zealand) A Wang | 10 | 11
(Japan) N Nidaira | 21 | 18 | 20
7 | (Canada) M Li | 14 | 21 | 22

Second round
PFQ | (Australia) S Kawakami | 17 | 15
(Chinese Taipei) Lin H-t | 21 | 21
(Malaysia) Wong L C | 16 | 11
7 | (Canada) M Li | 21 | 21

Quarter-finals
(Chinese Taipei) Lin H-t | 13 | 10
7 | (Canada) M Li | 21 | 21

==== Section 4 ====
First round
(Chinese Taipei) Pai Y-p | 17 | 16
(Chinese Taipei) Chen S-y | 21 | 21
(Japan) A Takahashi | 8 | 15
SWM | (Chinese Taipei) Chiu P-c | 21 | 21
(Chinese Taipei) Hsu W-c | 21 | 21
(Peru) I Castillo | 11 | 12
(Chinese Taipei) Sung S-y | 12 | 8
2 | (Indonesia) P K Wardani | 21 | 21

Second round
(Chinese Taipei) Chen S-y | 21 | 20 | 21
SWM | (Chinese Taipei) Chiu P-c | 19 | 22 | 15
(Chinese Taipei) Hsu W-c | 15 | 10
2 | (Indonesia) P K Wardani | 21 | 21

Quarter-finals
(Chinese Taipei) Chen S-y | 8 | 10
2 | (Indonesia) P K Wardani | 21 | 21

== Men's doubles ==
=== Seeds ===
1. (India) Satwiksairaj Rankireddy / Chirag Shetty (quarter-finals)
2. (Malaysia) Goh Sze Fei / Nur Izzuddin (semi-finals)
3. (Malaysia) Man Wei Chong / Tee Kai Wun (quarter-finals)
4. (Indonesia) Sabar Karyaman Gutama / Muhammad Reza Pahlevi Isfahani (semi-finals)
5. (Indonesia) Fajar Alfian / Muhammad Shohibul Fikri (final)
6. (Japan) Takuro Hoki / Yugo Kobayashi (withdrew)
7. (Chinese Taipei) Lee Jhe-huei / Yang Po-hsuan (first round)
8. (Chinese Taipei) Chiu Hsiang-chieh / Wang Chi-lin (second round)

=== Finals ===
Semi-finals
5 | (Indonesia) Fajar Alfian (Indonesia) Muhammad Shohibul Fikri | 21 | 19 | 21
4 | (Indonesia) Sabar Karyaman Gutama (Indonesia) Muhammad Reza Pahlevi Isfahani | 15 | 21 | 16
(Indonesia) Raymond Indra (Indonesia) Nikolaus Joaquin | 21 | 21
2 | (Malaysia) Goh Sze Fei (Malaysia) Nur Izzuddin | 15 | 15

Final
5 | (Indonesia) Fajar Alfian (Indonesia) Muhammad Shohibul Fikri | 20 | 21 | 18
(Indonesia) Raymond Indra (Indonesia) Nikolaus Joaquin | 22 | 10 | 21

=== Top half ===
==== Section 1 ====
First round
1 | (India) S Rankireddy (India) C Shetty | 25 | 21
(Chinese Taipei) Chang K-c (Chinese Taipei) Po L-w | 23 | 16
(New Zealand) D Soedjasa (England) S Stallwood | 16 | 17
(Chinese Taipei) Su C-h (Chinese Taipei) Wu G-x | 21 | 21
5 | (Indonesia) F Alfian (Indonesia) M S Fikri | 21 | 21
(Malaysia) Lau Y S (Malaysia) Lim T J | 15 | 10
(Chinese Taipei) Chen Z-r (Chinese Taipei) Lin Y-c | 22 | 21
(South Korea) Jin Y (South Korea) Na S-s | 20 | 14

Second round
1 | (India) S Rankireddy (India) C Shetty | 21 | 21
(Chinese Taipei) Su C-h (Chinese Taipei) Wu G-x | 18 | 11
5 | (Indonesia) F Alfian (Indonesia) M S Fikri | 21 | 21
(Chinese Taipei) Chen Z-r (Chinese Taipei) Lin Y-c | 10 | 15

Quarter-finals
1 | (India) S Rankireddy (India) C Shetty | 19 | 15
5 | (Indonesia) F Alfian (Indonesia) M S Fikri | 21 | 21

==== Section 2 ====
First round
4 | (Indonesia) S K Gutama (Indonesia) M R Isfahani | 21 | 21
(Japan) H Midorikawa (Japan) K Yamashita | 19 | 16
(Chinese Taipei) Lee F-c (Chinese Taipei) Lee F-j | 22 | 21
Q2 | (Australia) K Igawa (Australia) Ooi Y H | 20 | 8
8 | (Chinese Taipei) Chiu H-c (Chinese Taipei) Wang C-l | w | / | o
Q1 | (Australia) Chan J Y (Australia) Kuo T-y
(Chinese Taipei) Chen C-k (Chinese Taipei) Lin B-w | 17 | 14
(Japan) K Kumagai (Japan) H Nishi | 21 | 21

Second round
4 | (Indonesia) S K Gutama (Indonesia) M R Isfahani | 22 | 17 | 22
(Chinese Taipei) Lee F-c (Chinese Taipei) Lee F-j | 20 | 21 | 20
8 | (Chinese Taipei) Chiu H-c (Chinese Taipei) Wang C-l | 11 | 22 | 21
(Japan) K Kumagai (Japan) H Nishi | 21 | 20 | 23

Quarter-finals
4 | (Indonesia) S K Gutama (Indonesia) M R Isfahani | 21 | 21
(Japan) K Kumagai (Japan) H Nishi | 17 | 13

=== Bottom half ===
==== Section 3 ====
First round
(Chinese Taipei) Lai P-y (Chinese Taipei) Tsai F-c | 18 | 23
(Indonesia) R Indra (Indonesia) N Joaquin | 21 | 25
(Malaysia) Choong H J (Malaysia) M Haikal | 21 | 21
7 | (Chinese Taipei) Lee J-h (Chinese Taipei) Yang P-hs | 10 | 13
(Malaysia) N M Azriyn (Malaysia) Tan W K | 19 | 21 | 20
(Denmark) C F Kjær (Denmark) R Kjær | 21 | 13 | 22
(Chinese Taipei) Chiang C-w (Chinese Taipei) Wu H-y | 21 | 16
3 | (Malaysia) Man W C (Malaysia) Tee K W | 23 | 21

Second round
(Indonesia) R Indra (Indonesia) N Joaquin | 18 | 21 | 21
(Malaysia) Choong H J (Malaysia) M Haikal | 21 | 17 | 15
(Denmark) C F Kjær (Denmark) R Kjær | 11 | 16
3 | (Malaysia) Man W C (Malaysia) Tee K W | 21 | 21

Quarter-finals
(Indonesia) R Indra (Indonesia) N Joaquin | 21 | 19 | 21
3 | (Malaysia) Man W C (Malaysia) Tee K W | 15 | 21 | 15

==== Section 4 ====
First round
PFQ | (New Zealand) R Deloy (New Zealand) A Jeffrey | 8 | 13
(South Korea) Choi S-g (Malaysia) Goh V S | 21 | 21
Q3 | (Australia) P Halim (Australia) L Kurniawan | 8 | 11
SWM | (Malaysia) J Arif (Malaysia) Yap R K | 21 | 21
Q4 | (Australia) R Hidayat (Australia) F Putra | 21 | 7 | 10
(Chinese Taipei) Liu K-h (Chinese Taipei) Yang P-ha | 16 | 21 | 21
(Chinese Taipei) He Z-w (Chinese Taipei) Huang J-h | 10 | 10
2 | (Malaysia) Goh S F (Malaysia) N Izzuddin | 21 | 21

Second round
(South Korea) Choi S-g (Malaysia) Goh V S | 21 | 21
SWM | (Malaysia) J Arif (Malaysia) Yap R K | 19 | 13
(Chinese Taipei) Liu K-h (Chinese Taipei) Yang P-ha | 23 | 17 | 10
2 | (Malaysia) Goh S F (Malaysia) N Izzuddin | 21 | 21 | 21

Quarter-finals
(South Korea) Choi S-g (Malaysia) Goh V S | 13 | 22 | 20
2 | (Malaysia) Goh S F (Malaysia) N Izzuddin | 21 | 20 | 22

== Women's doubles ==
=== Seeds ===
1. (Malaysia) Pearly Tan / Thinaah Muralitharan (withdrew)
2. (Japan) Rin Iwanaga / Kie Nakanishi (second round)
3. (Chinese Taipei) Hsieh Pei-shan / Hung En-tzu (first round)
4. (India) Treesa Jolly / Gayatri Gopichand (first round)
5. (Japan) Arisa Igarashi / Chiharu Shida (withdrew)
6. (Chinese Taipei) Hsu Yin-hui / Lin Jhih-yun (first round)
7. (Chinese Taipei) Chang Ching-hui / Yang Ching-tun (first round)
8. (South Korea) Jeong Na-eun / Lee Yeon-woo (withdrew)

=== Finals ===
Semi-finals
(Indonesia) Febriana Dwipuji Kusuma (Indonesia) Meilysa Trias Puspita Sari | 19 | 21 | 21
(Japan) Ririna Hiramoto (Japan) Kokona Ishikawa | 21 | 11 | 12
(United States) Francesca Corbett (United States) Jennie Gai | 18 | 19
(Indonesia) Rachel Allessya Rose (Indonesia) Febi Setianingrum | 21 | 21

Final
(Indonesia) Febriana Dwipuji Kusuma (Indonesia) Meilysa Trias Puspita Sari | 21 | 19 | 21
(Indonesia) Rachel Allessya Rose (Indonesia) Febi Setianingrum | 18 | 21 | 23

=== Top half ===
==== Section 1 ====
First round
4 | (India) T Jolly (India) G Gopichand | 10 | 14
(Indonesia) F D Kusuma (Indonesia) M T Puspitasari | 21 | 21
Q4 | (Australia) H Chan (Australia) Han SX | 10 | 12
PFQ | (Australia) A Bijomon (Australia) Liang XW | 21 | 21
SWM | (Japan) R Hirokami (Japan) S Hobara | 21 | 21
(Canada) J Dent (Canada) C Lai | 16 | 12
PFQ | (Australia) T Ho (Australia) F Huo | 4 | 9
(Chinese Taipei) Teng C-h (Chinese Taipei) Yang C-y | 21 | 21

Second round
(Indonesia) F D Kusuma (Indonesia) M T Puspitasari | 21 | 21
PFQ | (Australia) A Bijomon (Australia) Liang XW | 8 | 6
SWM | (Japan) R Hirokami (Japan) S Hobara | 21 | 21
(Chinese Taipei) Teng C-h (Chinese Taipei) Yang C-y | 12 | 15

Quarter-finals
(Indonesia) F D Kusuma (Indonesia) M T Puspitasari | 21 | 21
SWM | (Japan) R Hirokami (Japan) S Hobara | 11 | 16

==== Section 2 ====
First round
6 | (Chinese Taipei) Hsu Y-h (Chinese Taipei) Lin J-y | 13 | 15
(Chinese Taipei) Chen Y-f (Chinese Taipei) Sun L-c | 21 | 21
(Japan) R Hiramoto (Japan) K Ishikawa | 21 | 21
(Chinese Taipei) Chen S-y (Chinese Taipei) Hsieh Y-e | 17 | 16
SWM | (Chinese Taipei) Hsu Y-c (Chinese Taipei) Sung Y-h | 21 | 21
Q1 | (Australia) L Griselda (Australia) N Shimizu | 17 | 15
(Chinese Taipei) Lee C-c (Chinese Taipei) Lin Y-y | 18 | 21 | 14
(Chinese Taipei) Sung S-y (Chinese Taipei) Yu C-h | 21 | 17 | 21

Second round
(Chinese Taipei) Chen Y-f (Chinese Taipei) Sun L-c | 20 | 20
(Japan) R Hiramoto (Japan) K Ishikawa | 22 | 22
SWM | (Chinese Taipei) Hsu Y-c (Chinese Taipei) Sung Y-h | 17 | 21 | 21
(Chinese Taipei) Sung S-y (Chinese Taipei) Yu C-h | 21 | 17 | 12

Quarter-finals
(Japan) R Hiramoto (Japan) K Ishikawa | 22 | 21
SWM | (Chinese Taipei) Hsu Y-c (Chinese Taipei) Sung Y-h | 20 | 10

=== Bottom half ===
==== Section 3 ====
First round
PFQ | (Australia) J Lam (Australia) Lim Y-y | 8 | 6
(Thailand) B Aimsaard (Thailand) S S Wedler | 21 | 21
(Chinese Taipei) Hu L-f (Chinese Taipei) Jheng Y-c | 21 | 21
7 | (Chinese Taipei) Chang C-h (Chinese Taipei) Yang C-t | 19 | 17
Q2 | (Australia) Zhang YR (Australia) Zhao QQ | 4 | 12
(Indonesia) L T Mayasari (Indonesia) A C Pratiwi | 21 | 21
(United States) F Corbett (United States) J Gai | 21 | 21
3 | (Chinese Taipei) Hsieh P-s (Chinese Taipei) Hung E-t | 19 | 14

Second round
(Thailand) B Aimsaard (Thailand) S S Wedler | 16 | 21 | 12
(Chinese Taipei) Hu L-f (Chinese Taipei) Jheng Y-c | 21 | 12 | 21
(Indonesia) L T Mayasari (Indonesia) A C Pratiwi | 21 | 17 | 18
(United States) F Corbett (United States) J Gai | 18 | 21 | 21

Quarter-finals
(Chinese Taipei) Hu L-f (Chinese Taipei) Jheng Y-c | 21 | 10 | 12
(United States) F Corbett (United States) J Gai | 10 | 21 | 21

==== Section 4 ====
First round
(Japan) N Hara (Japan) R Kiyose | 21 | 21
(Australia) S Kawakami (Australia) P Kustiadi | 10 | 4
Q3 | (Australia) S Tjonadi (Australia) V Tjonadi | 10 | 6
SWM | (Indonesia) A Rahayu (Indonesia) S F S Ramadhanti | 21 | 21
(Australia) G Somerville (Australia) A Yu | 21 | 14 | 15
(Indonesia) R A Rose (Indonesia) F Setianingrum | 17 | 21 | 21
(Chinese Taipei) Lin X-m (Chinese Taipei) Wang Y-q | 21 | 14 | 14
2 | (Japan) R Iwanaga (Japan) K Nakanishi | 18 | 21 | 21

Second round
(Japan) N Hara (Japan) R Kiyose | 11 | 21 | 10
SWM | (Indonesia) A Rahayu (Indonesia) S F S Ramadhanti | 21 | 12 | 21
(Indonesia) R A Rose (Indonesia) F Setianingrum | 25 | 25
2 | (Japan) R Iwanaga (Japan) K Nakanishi | 23 | 23

Quarter-finals
SWM | (Indonesia) A Rahayu (Indonesia) S F S Ramadhanti | 10 | 19
(Indonesia) R A Rose (Indonesia) F Setianingrum | 21 | 21

== Mixed doubles ==
=== Seeds ===
1. (Malaysia) Chen Tang Jie / Toh Ee Wei (champions)
2. (Indonesia) Jafar Hidayatullah / Felisha Pasaribu (final)
3. (Thailand) Ruttanapak Oupthong / Jhenicha Sudjaipraparat (semi-finals)
4. (Chinese Taipei) Yang Po-hsuan / Hu Ling-fang (quarter-finals)
5. (Chinese Taipei) Ye Hong-wei / Nicole Gonzales Chan (quarter-finals)
6. (Denmark) Mathias Christiansen / Alexandra Bøje (quarter-finals)
7. (Malaysia) Hoo Pang Ron / Cheng Su Yin (first round)
8. (Indonesia) Adnan Maulana / Indah Cahya Sari Jamil (second round)

=== Finals ===
Semi-finals
1 | (Malaysia) Chen Tang Jie (Malaysia) Toh Ee Wei | 21 | 21
(Thailand) Pakkapon Teeraratsakul (Thailand) Sapsiree Taerattanachai | 16 | 14
3 | (Thailand) Ruttanapak Oupthong (Thailand) Jhenicha Sudjaipraparat | 21 | 13 | 14
2 | (Indonesia) Jafar Hidayatullah (Indonesia) Felisha Pasaribu | 19 | 21 | 21

Final
1 | (Malaysia) Chen Tang Jie (Malaysia) Toh Ee Wei | 21 | 21
2 | (Indonesia) Jafar Hidayatullah (Indonesia) Felisha Pasaribu | 16 | 11

=== Top half ===
==== Section 1 ====
First round
1 | (Malaysia) Chen T J (Malaysia) Toh E W | 21 | 21
(Malaysia) Wong T C (Malaysia) Lim C S | 19 | 9
(Chinese Taipei) Lu M-c (Chinese Taipei) Hung E-t | 18 | 14
(Chinese Taipei) Liu K-h (Chinese Taipei) Jheng Y-c | 21 | 21
5 | (Chinese Taipei) Ye H-w (Chinese Taipei) N G Chan | 21 | 21
PFQ | (Australia) J Lim (Australia) V Tjonadi | 10 | 11
Q1 | (Chinese Taipei) Lin Y-c (Chinese Taipei) Lee C-c | 21 | 21
Q4 | (Chinese Taipei) Huang J-h (Chinese Taipei) Chen Y-f | 16 | 10

Second round
1 | (Malaysia) Chen T J (Malaysia) Toh E W | 21 | 21
(Chinese Taipei) Liu K-h (Chinese Taipei) Jheng Y-c | 16 | 14
5 | (Chinese Taipei) Ye H-w (Chinese Taipei) N G Chan | 21 | 21
Q1 | (Chinese Taipei) Lin Y-c (Chinese Taipei) Lee C-c | 10 | 15

Quarter-finals
1 | (Malaysia) Chen T J (Malaysia) Toh E W | 21 | 21
5 | (Chinese Taipei) Ye H-w (Chinese Taipei) N G Chan | 17 | 15

==== Section 2 ====
First round
4 | (Chinese Taipei) Yang P-hs (Chinese Taipei) Hu L-f | 21 | 21
(Chinese Taipei) Po L-w (Chinese Taipei) Chang C-h | 12 | 14
(Chinese Taipei) He Z-w (Chinese Taipei) Sun L-c | 21 | 17 | 21
Q2 | (Australia) M Owen (Australia) S Kurniawan | 15 | 21 | 13
8 | (Indonesia) A Maulana (Indonesia) I C S Jamil | 21 | 21
(New Zealand) E Lau (New Zealand) S Li | 14 | 9
(Thailand) Pak Teeraratsakul (Thailand) S Taerattanachai | 21 | 9 | 21
(Japan) A Koga (Japan) M Matsutomo | 14 | 21 | 17

Second round
4 | (Chinese Taipei) Yang P-hs (Chinese Taipei) Hu L-f | 21 | 21
(Chinese Taipei) He Z-w (Chinese Taipei) Sun L-c | 13 | 16
8 | (Indonesia) A Maulana (Indonesia) I C S Jamil | 21 | 5 | 14
(Thailand) Pak Teeraratsakul (Thailand) S Taerattanachai | 19 | 21 | 21

Quarter-finals
4 | (Chinese Taipei) Yang P-hs (Chinese Taipei) Hu L-f | 21 | 15 | 12
(Thailand) Pak Teeraratsakul (Thailand) S Taerattanachai | 17 | 21 | 21

=== Bottom half ===
==== Section 3 ====
First round
(Australia) R Agustino (Australia) P Kustiadi | 17 | 12
(Thailand) P Horbanluekit (Thailand) B Aimsaard | 21 | 21
(Australia) A Ramadiansyah (Australia) N Shimizu | 14 | 21 | 21
7 | (Malaysia) Hoo P R (Malaysia) Cheng S Y | 21 | 16 | 18
(Canada) N Yakura (Canada) C Lai | 21 | 21
(India) M Jaglan (India) L Jaglan | 12 | 16
(Chinese Taipei) Wu H-y (Chinese Taipei) Yang C-y | 15 | 15
3 | (Thailand) R Oupthong (Thailand) J Sudjaipraparat | 21 | 21

Second round
(Thailand) P Horbanluekit (Thailand) B Aimsaard | 21 | 21
(Australia) A Ramadiansyah (Australia) N Shimizu | 17 | 17
(Canada) N Yakura (Canada) C Lai | 18 | 10
3 | (Thailand) R Oupthong (Thailand) J Sudjaipraparat | 21 | 21

Quarter-finals
(Thailand) P Horbanluekit (Thailand) B Aimsaard | 12 | 15
3 | (Thailand) R Oupthong (Thailand) J Sudjaipraparat | 21 | 21

==== Section 4 ====
First round
Q3 | (Australia) K Igawa (Australia) S Tjonadi | 11 | 10
(Chinese Taipei) Chen C-k (Chinese Taipei) Hsu Y-h | 21 | 21
(South Korea) Kim J-h (South Korea) Jeong N-e | 12 | 21 | 17
6 | (Denmark) M Christiansen (Denmark) A Bøje | 21 | 17 | 21
(Chinese Taipei) Wu G-x (Chinese Taipei) Lee C-h | 21 | 21
(Germany) C Devereux (Germany) D Toepffer | 3 | 4
(Malaysia) J Wong (Malaysia) Lai P J | 16 | 18
2 | (Indonesia) J Hidayatullah (Indonesia) F Pasaribu | 21 | 21

Second round
(Chinese Taipei) Chen C-k (Chinese Taipei) Hsu Y-h | 9 | 8
6 | (Denmark) M Christiansen (Denmark) A Bøje | 21 | 21
(Chinese Taipei) Wu G-x (Chinese Taipei) Lee C-h | 22 | 14
2 | (Indonesia) J Hidayatullah (Indonesia) F Pasaribu | 24 | 21

Quarter-finals
6 | (Denmark) M Christiansen (Denmark) A Bøje | 21 | 16 | 13
2 | (Indonesia) J Hidayatullah (Indonesia) F Pasaribu | 17 | 21 | 21

| Preceded by 2025 Japan Masters | BWF World Tour; 2025 BWF season | Succeeded by 2025 Syed Modi International |
