= 2023 Indonesia Masters Super 100 I =

Badminton tournament in Indonesia

Tournament details
- Dates: 5–10 September
- Edition: 4th
- Level: Super 100
- Total prize money: US$100,000
- Venue: GOR PBSI Pancing
- Location: Deli Serdang, North Sumatra, Indonesia

Champions
- Men's singles: (India) Kiran George
- Women's singles: (Indonesia) Ester Nurumi Tri Wardoyo
- Men's doubles: (Indonesia) Sabar Karyaman Gutama (Indonesia) Muhammad Reza Pahlevi Isfahani
- Women's doubles: (Indonesia) Lanny Tria Mayasari (Indonesia) Ribka Sugiarto
- Mixed doubles: (Malaysia) Yap Roy King (Malaysia) Valeree Siow

The 2023 Indonesia Masters Super 100 I (officially known as the BNI Indonesia Masters I 2023 for sponsorship reasons) was a badminton tournament which took place at GOR PBSI Pancing in Deli Serdang, North Sumatra, Indonesia, from 5 to 10 September 2023 and had a total purse of $100,000.

== Tournament ==
The 2023 Indonesia Masters Super 100 I was the twenty-second tournament of the 2023 BWF World Tour and also part of the Indonesia Masters Super 100 championships, which had been held since 2018. This tournament was organized by the Badminton Association of Indonesia and sanctioned by the BWF.

=== Venue ===
This tournament was held at GOR PBSI Pancing in Deli Serdang, North Sumatra, Indonesia.

=== Point distribution ===
Below is the point distribution table for each phase of the tournament based on the BWF points system for the BWF Tour Super 100 event.

Winner	Runner-up	3/4	5/8	9/16	17/32	33/64	65/128	129/256
5,500	4,680	3,850	3,030	2,110	1,290	510	240	100

=== Prize pool ===
The total prize money was US$100,000 with the distribution of the prize money in accordance with BWF regulations.

Event	Winner	Finalist	Semi-finals	Quarter-finals	Last 16
Singles	$7,500	$3,800	$1,450	$600	$350
Doubles	$7,900	$3,800	$1,400	$725	$375

== Men's singles ==
=== Seeds ===
1. (Japan) Koki Watanabe (third round)
2. (Chinese Taipei) Su Li-yang (quarter-finals)
3. (Chinese Taipei) Lee Chia-hao (second round)
4. (France) Arnaud Merklé (second round)
5. (Chinese Taipei) Chi Yu-jen (third round)
6. (Malaysia) Leong Jun Hao (third round)
7. (Malaysia) Cheam June Wei (second round)
8. (France) Alex Lanier (withdrew)

=== Finals ===
Semi-finals
(Japan) Yushi Tanaka	7	17
(Japan) Koo Takahashi	21	21
(India) Kiran George	23	16	21
(Indonesia) Tommy Sugiarto	21	21	8

Final
(Japan) Koo Takahashi	19	20
(India) Kiran George	21	22

=== Top half ===
==== Section 1 ====
First round
(Chinese Taipei) Kuo K-l	21	21	21
Q5	(Australia) J Yu	23	19	6
(Indonesia) A Farhan	13	21
(Malaysia) S Aidil	21	23
(Malaysia) Ong Z Y	21	19	21
(Chinese Taipei) Yang Y	15	21	16
Q3	(India) R Sanjeevi	17	21	16
(Japan) Y Tanaka	21	12	21

Second round
1	(Japan) K Watanabe	21	21
(Chinese Taipei) Kuo K-l	14	17
PFQ	(United States) E Asuncion	16	16
(Malaysia) S Aidil	21	21
6	(Malaysia) Leong J H	21	21
(Malaysia) Ong Z Y	19	19
(Sri Lanka) V Nettasinghe	21	16	17
(Japan) Y Tanaka	17	21	21

Third round
1	(Japan) K Watanabe	19	14
(Malaysia) S Aidil	21	21
6	(Malaysia) Leong J H	8	18
(Japan) Y Tanaka	21	21

Quarter-finals
(Malaysia) S Aidil
(Japan) Y Tanaka	w	/	o

==== Section 2 ====
First round
(India) M Maisnam	15	21	12
(Indonesia) I Rumbay	21	11	21
(Chinese Taipei) Liao J-f	15	21	21
(Germany) S Hsiao	21	18	9
(Chinese Taipei) Lin K-t	15	21
(Japan) K Takahashi	21	23
Q1	(Japan) R Muramoto	23	10
(India) S Gupta	25	21

Second round
3	(Chinese Taipei) Lee C-h	17	9
(Indonesia) I Rumbay	21	21
(Chinese Taipei) Wang P-w	21	21
(Chinese Taipei) Liao J-f	8	13
PFQ	(Australia) J Schueler	8	5
(Japan) K Takahashi	21	21
(India) A Mishra	21	21
(India) S Gupta	18	14

Third round
(Indonesia) I Rumbay	19	21	15
(Chinese Taipei) Wang P-w	21	15	21
(Japan) K Takahashi	21	21
(India) A Mishra	19	16

Quarter-finals
(Chinese Taipei) Wang P-w	17	15
(Japan) K Takahashi	21	21

=== Bottom half ===
==== Section 3 ====
First round
(India) K George	21	21
(Chinese Taipei) Huang Y-k	13	16
(Japan) T Obayashi	7	21	21
(Hong Kong) Chan Y C	21	15	12
(Malaysia) Soong J V	21	21
Q6	(Malaysia) Lim C K	17	13
Q7	(Indonesia) Y S Marcellyno	21	19	21
(Japan) R Hatano	17	21	6

Second round
(India) K George	21	21
(Singapore) J Koh	14	8
(Japan) T Obayashi	12	21	21
7	(Malaysia) Cheam J W	21	14	13
(Malaysia) Soong J V	18	21	18
Q4	(Thailand) P Teeraratsakul	21	17	21
Q7	(Indonesia) Y S Marcellyno	21	21	21
4	(France) A Merklé	15	23	15

Third round
(India) K George	18	21	21
(Japan) T Obayashi	21	19	19
Q4	(Thailand) P Teeraratsakul	21	17	21
Q7	(Indonesia) Y S Marcellyno	16	21	17

Quarter-finals
(India) K George	21	21
Q4	(Thailand) P Teeraratsakul	9	19

==== Section 4 ====
First round
(Malaysia) Ong K Y	21	21
(Singapore) J Teh	19	13
(Hong Kong) J Gunawan	15	17
(Indonesia) I D Syahputra	21	21
(Chinese Taipei) Chen C-t	23	15	21
(India) S Subramanian	21	21	16
(Indonesia) B Setiabudi	7	15
Q2	(India) Ravi	21	21

Second round
(Malaysia) Ong K Y	12	6
(Indonesia) T Sugiarto	21	21
(Indonesia) I D Syahputra	14	15
5	(Chinese Taipei) Chi Y-j	21	21
(Chinese Taipei) Chen C-t	21	21
Q8	(Indonesia) J C Alexander	18	13
Q2	(India) Ravi	22	18
2	(Chinese Taipei) Su L-y	24	21

Third round
(Indonesia) T Sugiarto	21	21
5	(Chinese Taipei) Chi Y-j	16	10
(Chinese Taipei) Chen C-t	17	11
2	(Chinese Taipei) Su L-y	21	21

Quarter-finals
(Indonesia) T Sugiarto	24	12	21
2	(Chinese Taipei) Su L-y	22	21	13

== Women's singles ==
=== Seeds ===
1. (Japan) Nozomi Okuhara (quarter-finals)
2. (Chinese Taipei) Lin Hsiang-ti (first round)
3. (India) Malvika Bansod (second round)
4. (Indonesia) Komang Ayu Cahya Dewi (semi-finals)
5. (Chinese Taipei) Huang Yu-hsun (quarter-finals)
6. (Japan) Riko Gunji (quarter-finals)
7. (Thailand) Pitchamon Opatniput (second round)
8. (Chinese Taipei) Huang Ching-ping (first round)

=== Finals ===
Semi-finals
Q4	(Japan) Tomoka Miyazaki	19	18
(Chinese Taipei) Chiu Pin-chian	21	21
4	(Indonesia) Komang Ayu Cahya Dewi	21	15	15
(Indonesia) Ester Nurumi Tri Wardoyo	19	21	21

Final
(Chinese Taipei) Chiu Pin-chian	15	19
(Indonesia) Ester Nurumi Tri Wardoyo	21	21

=== Top half ===
==== Section 1 ====
First round
1	(Japan) N Okuhara	18	21	21
(India) I Sharma	21	12	12
Q2	(Japan) S Saito	21	21
(India) A Upadhyaya	11	7
7	(Thailand) P Opatniput	21	17	21
PFQ	(France) R O Pancasari	16	21	18
PFQ	(Chinese Taipei) Lin S Y	21	18	13
Q4	(Japan) T Miyazaki	10	21	21

Second round
1	(Japan) N Okuhara	21	21
Q2	(Japan) S Saito	12	10
7	(Thailand) P Opatniput	12	24	9
Q4	(Japan) T Miyazaki	21	22	21

Quarter-finals
1	(Japan) N Okuhara	19	21	19
Q4	(Japan) T Miyazaki	21	15	21

==== Section 2 ====
First round
3	(India) M Bansod	21	21
(Chinese Taipei) Liang T-y	16	17
(Indonesia) B Prasista	15	21	12
PFQ	(India) M Singh	21	13	21
8	(Chinese Taipei) Huang C-p	15	16
(Chinese Taipei) Chiu P-c	21	21
(India) A Bhatt	21	19	21
Q3	(Hong Kong) Lo S Y	8	21	10

Second round
3	(India) M Bansod	21	22	16
PFQ	(India) M Singh	23	20	21
(Chinese Taipei) Chiu P-c	23	21
(India) A Bhatt	21	14

Quarter-finals
PFQ	(India) M Singh	16	18
(Chinese Taipei) Chiu P-c	21	21

=== Bottom half ===
==== Section 3 ====
First round
(Malaysia) Letshanaa K	21	21
(Bulgaria) K Nalbantova	13	19
(Indonesia) Y Y Susanto	19	13
5	(Chinese Taipei) Huang Y-h	21	21
(Indonesia) S Widjaja	16	22	21
(Myanmar) Thet Htar T	21	20	19
(Chinese Taipei) Chen S-y	17	19
4	(Indonesia) K A C Dewi	21	21

Second round
(Malaysia) Letshanaa K	15	18
5	(Chinese Taipei) Huang Y-h	21	21
(Indonesia) S Widjaja	17	21	14
4	(Indonesia) K A C Dewi	21	12	21

Quarter-finals
5	(Chinese Taipei) Huang Y-h	19	13
4	(Indonesia) K A C Dewi	21	21

==== Section 4 ====
First round
(India) Gadde R S	11	6
Q1	(Indonesia) D H Nurtertiati	21	21
(Canada) R Chan	20	16
6	(Japan) R Gunji	22	21
(Thailand) P Choeikeewong	21	21
PFQ	(Chinese Taipei) Tung C-t	13	15
(Indonesia) E N T Wardoyo	21	21
2	(Chinese Taipei) Lin H-t	19	19

Second round
Q1	(Indonesia) D H Nurtertiati	22	13	13
6	(Japan) R Gunji	20	21	21
(Thailand) P Choeikeewong	15	21	12
(Indonesia) E N T Wardoyo	21	12	21

Quarter-finals
6	(Japan) R Gunji	11	21	22
(Indonesia) E N T Wardoyo	21	10	24

== Men's doubles ==
=== Seeds ===
1. (Thailand) Pharanyu Kaosamaang / Worrapol Thongsa-nga (second round)
2. (Philippines) Christian Bernardo / Alvin Morada (withdrew)
3. (Chinese Taipei) Lin Yu-chieh / Su Li-wei (second round)
4. (Indonesia) Sabar Karyaman Gutama / Muhammad Reza Pahlevi Isfahani (champions)
5. (Malaysia) Junaidi Arif / Yap Roy King (semi-finals)
6. (Japan) Kenya Mitsuhashi / Hiroki Okamura (quarter-finals)
7. (Malaysia) Low Hang Yee / Ng Eng Cheong (quarter-finals)
8. (Chinese Taipei) Chen Zhi-ray / Lu Chen (semi-finals)

=== Finals ===
Semi-finals
(Japan) Kakeru Kumagai (Japan) Kota Ogawa	21	11	21
8	(Chinese Taipei) Chen Zhi-ray (Chinese Taipei) Lu Chen	16	21	16
4	(Indonesia) Sabar Karyaman Gutama (Indonesia) Muhammad Reza Pahlevi Isfahani	21	21
5	(Malaysia) Junaidi Arif (Malaysia) Yap Roy King	13	19

Final
(Japan) Kakeru Kumagai (Japan) Kota Ogawa	18	15
4	(Indonesia) Sabar Karyaman Gutama (Indonesia) Muhammad Reza Pahlevi Isfahani	21	21

=== Top half ===
==== Section 1 ====
First round
1	(Thailand) P Kaosamaang (Thailand) W Thongsa-nga	21	21
Q3	(Japan) Y Okimoto (Japan) D Tanioka	14	18
(Japan) K Kumagai (Japan) K Ogawa	21	21
Q4	(Thailand) P Tangsrirapeephan (Thailand) A Teerawiwat	17	19
6	(Japan) K Mitsuhashi (Japan) H Okamura	21	21
(Malaysia) Boon X Y (Malaysia) Wong T C	18	16
(Thailand) P Sukphun (Thailand) P Teeraratsakul	15	8
(Chinese Taipei) Chen C-k (Chinese Taipei) Chen S-f	21	21

Second round
1	(Thailand) P Kaosamaang (Thailand) W Thongsa-nga	21	19	17
(Japan) K Kumagai (Japan) K Ogawa	13	21	21
6	(Japan) K Mitsuhashi (Japan) H Okamura	21	21
(Chinese Taipei) Chen C-k (Chinese Taipei) Chen S-f	16	13

Quarter-finals
(Japan) K Kumagai (Japan) K Ogawa	22	21
6	(Japan) K Mitsuhashi (Japan) H Okamura	20	18

==== Section 2 ====
First round
3	(Chinese Taipei) Lin Y-c (Chinese Taipei) Su L-w	21	21
(Indonesia) P Erwiansyah (Indonesia) P H Rindorindo	14	18
Q1	(Malaysia) D Khoo (Malaysia) Tan L B	5	9
Q2	(Indonesia) M A Farizi (Indonesia) N Joaquin	21	21
8	(Chinese Taipei) Chen Z-r (Chinese Taipei) Lu C	21	21
(Indonesia) Hardianto (Indonesia) A Y Santoso	19	16
PFQ	(Malaysia) Lau Y S (Malaysia) Lee Y B	21	21
(Indonesia) R Indra (Indonesia) D E Marvino	18	15

Second round
3	(Chinese Taipei) Lin Y-c (Chinese Taipei) Su L-w	11	21	13
Q2	(Indonesia) M A Farizi (Indonesia) N Joaquin	21	14	21
8	(Chinese Taipei) Chen Z-r (Chinese Taipei) Lu C	21	14	21
PFQ	(Malaysia) Lau Y S (Malaysia) Lee Y B	18	21	10

Quarter-finals
Q2	(Indonesia) M A Farizi (Indonesia) N Joaquin	15	18
8	(Chinese Taipei) Chen Z-r (Chinese Taipei) Lu C	21	21

=== Bottom half ===
==== Section 3 ====
First round
(Chinese Taipei) Lu M-c (Chinese Taipei) Tang K-w	12	20
(Malaysia) Choong H J (Malaysia) M Haikal	21	22
(Chinese Taipei) Chiang C-w (Chinese Taipei) Wu H-y	18	21	11
7	(Malaysia) Low H Y (Malaysia) Ng E C	21	19	21
(Malaysia) Chia W J (Malaysia) Liew X	21	21
(Australia) K M Edison (Australia) J Yu	6	4
(Malaysia) Beh C M (Malaysia) Goh B Z	19	13
4	(Indonesia) S K Gutama (Indonesia) M R P Isfahani	21	21

Second round
(Malaysia) Choong H J (Malaysia) M Haikal	18	19
7	(Malaysia) Low H Y (Malaysia) Ng E C	21	21
(Malaysia) Chia W J (Malaysia) Liew X	16	15
4	(Indonesia) S K Gutama (Indonesia) M R P Isfahani	21	21

Quarter-finals
7	(Malaysia) Low H Y (Malaysia) Ng E C	16	14
4	(Indonesia) S K Gutama (Indonesia) M R P Isfahani	21	21

==== Section 4 ====
First round
PFQ	(Indonesia) T S C Hutomo (Indonesia) C D Wijaya	21	21
(Chinese Taipei) Wei C-w (Chinese Taipei) Wu G-x	17	19
(Thailand) T Punpanich (Thailand) W Sothon	19	16
5	(Malaysia) J Arif (Malaysia) Yap R K	21	21
(Chinese Taipei) Lin B-w (Chinese Taipei) Tseng P-c	21	13	21
(Thailand) W Phakjarung (Thailand) T Viriyangkura	11	21	19
(Malaysia) Lwi S H (Malaysia) J Wong	21	22	14
PFQ	(Philippines) S Padiz (Philippines) J Villabrille	10	24	21

Second round
PFQ	(Indonesia) T S C Hutomo (Indonesia) C D Wijaya	16	16
5	(Malaysia) J Arif (Malaysia) Yap R K	21	21
(Chinese Taipei) Lin B-w (Chinese Taipei) Tseng P-c	21	12	21
PFQ	(Philippines) S Padiz (Philippines) J Villabrille	17	21	14

Quarter-finals
5	(Malaysia) J Arif (Malaysia) Yap R K	21	21
(Chinese Taipei) Lin B-w (Chinese Taipei) Tseng P-c	5	15

== Women's doubles ==
=== Seeds ===
1. (Indonesia) Lanny Tria Mayasari / Ribka Sugiarto (champions)
2. (Chinese Taipei) Chang Ching-hui / Yang Ching-tun (final)
3. (Indonesia) Meilysa Trias Puspita Sari / Rachel Allessya Rose (quarter-finals)
4. (Chinese Taipei) Hsieh Pei-shan / Tseng Yu-chi (first round)
5. (Hong Kong) Lui Lok Lok / Ng Wing Yung (second round)
6. (Chinese Taipei) Hung En-tzu / Lin Yu-pei (quarter-finals)
7. (India) Tanisha Crasto / Ashwini Ponnappa (semi-finals)
8. (Thailand) Laksika Kanlaha / Phataimas Muenwong (quarter-finals)

=== Finals ===
Semi-finals
1	(Indonesia) Lanny Tria Mayasari (Indonesia) Ribka Sugiarto	20	21	21
7	(India) Tanisha Crasto (India) Ashwini Ponnappa	22	16	13
(Chinese Taipei) Sung Yu-hsuan (Chinese Taipei) Wang Szu-min	14	18
2	(Chinese Taipei) Chang Ching-hui (Chinese Taipei) Yang Ching-tun	21	21

Final
1	(Indonesia) Lanny Tria Mayasari (Indonesia) Ribka Sugiarto	22	21
2	(Chinese Taipei) Chang Ching-hui (Chinese Taipei) Yang Ching-tun	20	10

=== Top half ===
==== Section 1 ====
First round
1	(Indonesia) L T Mayasari (Indonesia) R Sugiarto	21	21
(Chinese Taipei) Lin C-c (Chinese Taipei) Wu M-c	9	11
PFQ	(Chinese Taipei) Jiang Y-h (Chinese Taipei) Li Z-q	24	21
(Chinese Taipei) Hsu Y-h (Chinese Taipei) Lin J-y	22	16
8	(Thailand) L Kanlaha (Thailand) P Muenwong	21	21
(India) R Panda (India) S Panda	11	17
Q1	(Thailand) O Jongsathapornparn (Thailand) N Samart
(Indonesia) A Kamila (Indonesia) A Z D Ramadhani	w	/	o

Second round
1	(Indonesia) L T Mayasari (Indonesia) R Sugiarto	21	21
PFQ	(Chinese Taipei) Jiang Y-h (Chinese Taipei) Li Z-q	6	7
8	(Thailand) L Kanlaha (Thailand) P Muenwong	16	21	23
(Indonesia) A Kamila (Indonesia) A Z D Ramadhani	21	19	21

Quarter-finals
1	(Indonesia) L T Mayasari (Indonesia) R Sugiarto	21	21
8	(Thailand) L Kanlaha (Thailand) P Muenwong	19	12

==== Section 2 ====
First round
3	(Indonesia) M T Puspita Sari (Indonesia) R A Rose	21	22
PFQ	(Indonesia) S A M Asharunnisa (Indonesia) S S Azzahra	17	20
(Indonesia) A N T Munggaran (Indonesia) A S Rahayu	21	21
Q4	(Chinese Taipei) Hung H-e (Chinese Taipei) Hung Y-e	11	18
7	(India) T Crasto (India) A Ponnappa	21	21
(Malaysia) Go P K (Malaysia) V Siow	18	14
(India) A Gahlawat (India) S Gahlawat	15	13
(Thailand) S Mingchua (Thailand) P Rungruengpramong	21	21

Second round
3	(Indonesia) M T Puspita Sari (Indonesia) R A Rose	21	21
(Indonesia) A N T Munggaran (Indonesia) A S Rahayu	8	18
7	(India) T Crasto (India) A Ponnappa	21	21
(Thailand) S Mingchua (Thailand) P Rungruengpramong	16	16

Quarter-finals
3	(Indonesia) M T Puspita Sari (Indonesia) R A Rose	21	17	11
7	(India) T Crasto (India) A Ponnappa	14	21	21

=== Bottom half ===
==== Section 3 ====
First round
(Japan) M Sudo (Japan) N Yamakita	21	17	14
(Indonesia) R A Fatasya (Indonesia) K Larissa	18	21	21
(Indonesia) T Nadia (Indonesia) P Syaikah	15	20
6	(Chinese Taipei) Hung E-t (Chinese Taipei) Lin Y-p	21	22
(Chinese Taipei) Sung Y-h (Chinese Taipei) Wang S-m	21	21
(Indonesia) R Amelia (Indonesia) M G Islami	14	16
Q3	(Malaysia) Lee X J (Malaysia) Tan Z Y	21	23
4	(Chinese Taipei) Hsieh P-s (Chinese Taipei) Tseng Y-c	19	21

Second round
(Indonesia) R A Fatasya (Indonesia) K Larissa	17	22
6	(Chinese Taipei) Hung E-t (Chinese Taipei) Lin Y-p	21	24
(Chinese Taipei) Sung Y-h (Chinese Taipei) Wang S-m	21	20	21
Q3	(Malaysia) Lee X J (Malaysia) Tan Z Y	15	22	10

Quarter-finals
6	(Chinese Taipei) Hung E-t (Chinese Taipei) Lin Y-p	15	19
(Chinese Taipei) Sung Y-h (Chinese Taipei) Wang S-m	21	21

==== Section 4 ====
First round
(India) Nik Rapria (India) Nis Rapria	9	12
(Indonesia) J P Miantoro (Indonesia) F Setianingrum	21	21
(Chinese Taipei) N G Chan (Chinese Taipei) Yang C-y	11	19
5	(Hong Kong) Lui L L (Hong Kong) Ng W Y	21	21
Q2	(Indonesia) M R Fitria (Indonesia) M A Putri	21	19	16
(Chinese Taipei) Chiu P-c (Chinese Taipei) Tung C-t	15	21	21
(Chinese Taipei) Cheng Y-p (Chinese Taipei) Sun W-p	16	16
2	(Chinese Taipei) Chang C-h (Chinese Taipei) Yang C-t	21	21

Second round
(Indonesia) J P Miantoro (Indonesia) F Setianingrum	21	21
5	(Hong Kong) Lui L L (Hong Kong) Ng W Y	15	19
(Chinese Taipei) Chiu P-c (Chinese Taipei) Tung C-t	10	16
2	(Chinese Taipei) Chang C-h (Chinese Taipei) Yang C-t	21	21

Quarter-finals
(Indonesia) J P Miantoro (Indonesia) F Setianingrum	17	9
2	(Chinese Taipei) Chang C-h (Chinese Taipei) Yang C-t	21	21

== Mixed doubles ==
=== Seeds ===
1. (Indonesia) Zachariah Josiahno Sumanti / Hediana Julimarbela (first round)
2. (Thailand) Ruttanapak Oupthong / Jhenicha Sudjaipraparat (first round)
3. (Indonesia) Jafar Hidayatullah / Aisyah Salsabila Putri Pranata (first round)
4. (Indonesia) Amri Syahnawi / Winny Oktavina Kandow (first round)
5. (India) K. Sai Pratheek / Tanisha Crasto (first round)
6. (India) Bokka Navaneeth / K. Maneesha (first round)
7. (Indonesia) Muhammad Reza Pahlevi Isfahani / Marsheilla Gischa Islami (second round)
8. (Philippines) Alvin Morada / Alyssa Leonardo (withdrew)

=== Finals ===
Semi-finals
(Malaysia) Yap Roy King (Malaysia) Valeree Siow	13	21	21
(Indonesia) Marwan Faza (Indonesia) Jessica Rismawardani	21	19	9
(Japan) Hiroki Nishi (Japan) Akari Sato	21	12	21
(Malaysia) Choong Hon Jian (Malaysia) Go Pei Kee	18	21	18

Final
(Malaysia) Yap Roy King (Malaysia) Valeree Siow	13	21	21
(Japan) Hiroki Nishi (Japan) Akari Sato	21	14	14

=== Top half ===
==== Section 1 ====
First round
1	(Indonesia) Z J Sumanti (Indonesia) H Julimarbela	15	19
(Thailand) P Teeraratsakul (Thailand) P Muenwong	21	21
(Chinese Taipei) Su L-w (Chinese Taipei) Lin Y-y	21	17	21
(Chinese Taipei) Chen Z-r (Chinese Taipei) Sun W-p	13	21	19
6	(India) B Navaneeth (India) K. Maneesha	9	21	18
(Malaysia) Yap R K (Malaysia) V Siow	21	19	21
Q4	(Chinese Taipei) Lu M-c (Chinese Taipei) Hung E-t	21	19	19
(Japan) K Kumagai (Japan) An Sato	18	21	21

Second round
(Thailand) P Teeraratsakul (Thailand) P Muenwong	21	21
(Chinese Taipei) Su L-w (Chinese Taipei) Lin Y-y	11	8
(Malaysia) Yap R K (Malaysia) V Siow	21	21
(Japan) K Kumagai (Japan) An Sato	15	9

Quarter-finals
(Thailand) P Teeraratsakul (Thailand) P Muenwong	19	18
(Malaysia) Yap R K (Malaysia) V Siow	21	21

==== Section 2 ====
First round
3	(Indonesia) J Hidayatullah (Indonesia) A Pranata	21	11	18
(Thailand) P Nipornram (Thailand) N Laisuan	13	21	21
(Thailand) W Phakjarung (Thailand) O Jongsathapornparn	21	21
(Chinese Taipei) Chen X-y (Chinese Taipei) Tsai R-l	13	17
7	(Indonesia) M R P Isfahani (Indonesia) M G Islami	19	21	21
(Chinese Taipei) Wei C-w (Chinese Taipei) N G Chan	21	17	18
(India) Kona T (India) S K P Kudaravalli	10	14
(Indonesia) M Faza (Indonesia) J Rismawardani	21	21

Second round
(Thailand) P Nipornram (Thailand) N Laisuan	21	21
(Thailand) W Phakjarung (Thailand) O Jongsathapornparn	17	15
7	(Indonesia) M R P Isfahani (Indonesia) M G Islami	12	19
(Indonesia) M Faza (Indonesia) J Rismawardani	21	21

Quarter-finals
(Thailand) P Nipornram (Thailand) N Laisuan	21	13	19
(Indonesia) M Faza (Indonesia) J Rismawardani	15	21	21

=== Bottom half ===
==== Section 3 ====
First round
(Japan) H Nishi (Japan) Ak Sato	w	/	o
Q1
(Thailand) R Makkasasithorn (Thailand) C Korepap	21	21
PFQ	(Indonesia) V Y Mulia (Indonesia) P V Elsadai	10	15
(Philippines) S Padiz (Philippines) E Inlayo	19	21	9
(Chinese Taipei) Lin B-w (Chinese Taipei) Lee C-c	21	18	21
(Thailand) T Viriyangkura (Thailand) A Sapniti	16	21	21
4	(Indonesia) A Syahnawi (Indonesia) W O Kandow	21	16	14

Second round
(Japan) H Nishi (Japan) Ak Sato	21	19	21
(Thailand) R Makkasasithorn (Thailand) C Korepap	16	21	17
(Chinese Taipei) Lin B-w (Chinese Taipei) Lee C-c	20	21	21
(Thailand) T Viriyangkura (Thailand) A Sapniti	22	16	13

Quarter-finals
(Japan) H Nishi (Japan) Ak Sato	21	19	21
(Chinese Taipei) Lin B-w (Chinese Taipei) Lee C-c	14	21	17

==== Section 4 ====
First round
(Indonesia) Z Nabawi (Indonesia) F Pasaribu	21	21
Q3	(Chinese Taipei) Lu C (Chinese Taipei) Cheng Y-p	14	11
(Chinese Taipei) Wu H-y (Chinese Taipei) Yang C-y	21	21
5	(India) K S Pratheek (India) T Crasto	15	17
Q2	(Chinese Taipei) Lin Y-c (Chinese Taipei) Hung Y-e	21	7	12
(Chinese Taipei) Tseng P-c (Chinese Taipei) Sung Y-h	15	21	21
(Malaysia) Choong H J (Malaysia) Go P K	21	21
2	(Thailand) R Oupthong (Thailand) J Sudjaipraparat	11	17

Second round
(Indonesia) Z Nabawi (Indonesia) F Pasaribu	21	21
(Chinese Taipei) Wu H-y (Chinese Taipei) Yang C-y	10	19
(Chinese Taipei) Tseng P-c (Chinese Taipei) Sung Y-h	15	19
(Malaysia) Choong H J (Malaysia) Go P K	21	21

Quarter-finals
(Indonesia) Z Nabawi (Indonesia) F Pasaribu	16	21	20
(Malaysia) Choong H J (Malaysia) Go P K	21	18	22

Preceded by 2022 Indonesia Masters Super 100	Indonesia Masters Super 100	Succeeded by 2023 Indonesia Masters Super 100 II
Preceded by 2023 Australian Open	BWF World Tour; 2023 BWF season	Succeeded by 2023 Hong Kong Open; 2023 Vietnam Open
