= Febi Setianingrum =

Indonesian badminton player (born 2004)

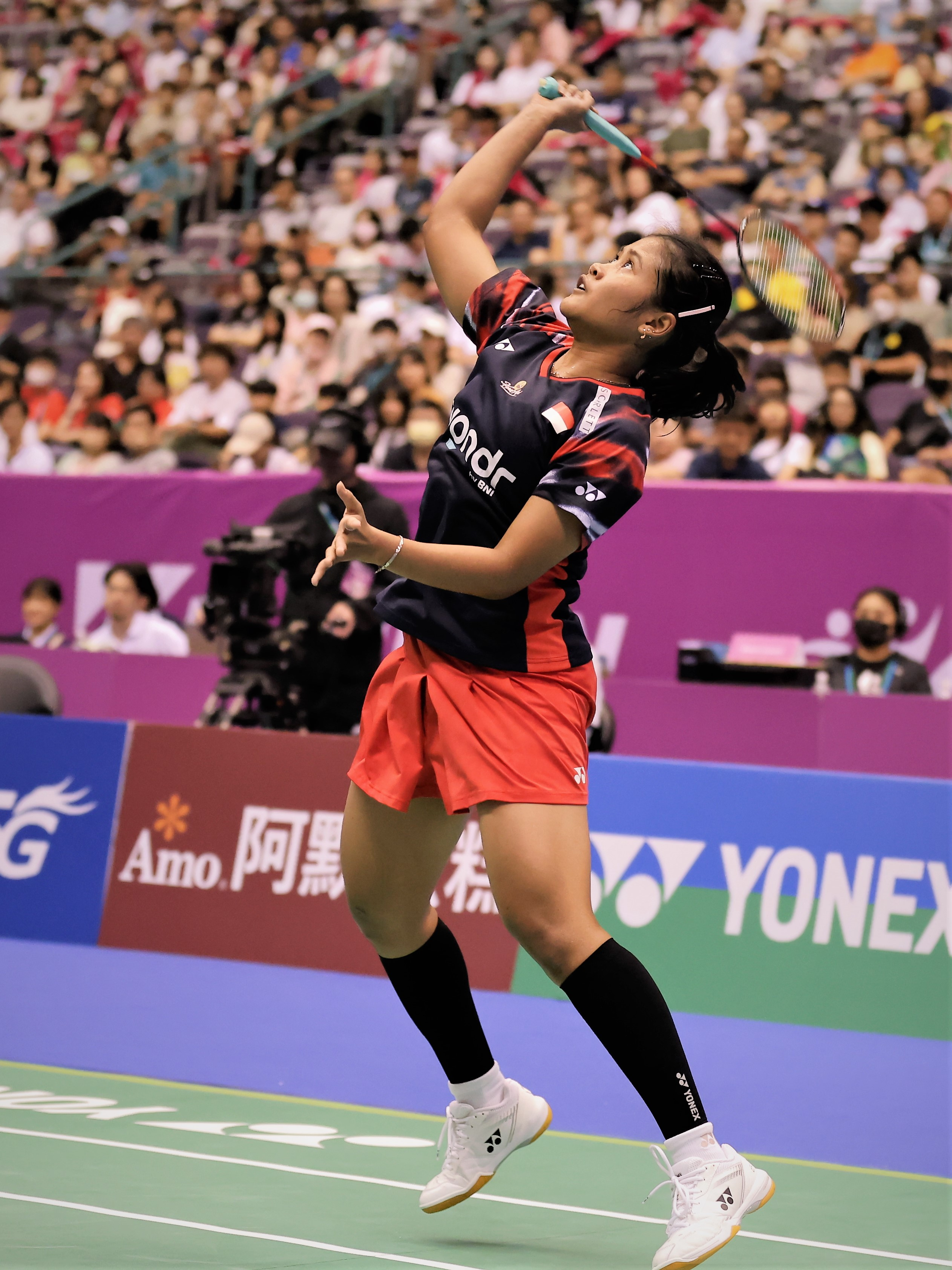
- Setianingrum at the 2024 Taipei Open

Personal information
- Born: 29 February 2004 (age 22) Tangerang, Banten, Indonesia

Sport
- Country: Indonesia
- Sport: Badminton
- Handedness: Right

Women's doubles
- Highest ranking: 6 (with Rachel Allessya Rose, 27 October 2026); 30 (with Jesita Putri Miantoro, 8 October 2024)
- Current ranking: 7 (with Rachel Allessya Rose, 17 November 2026)
- BWF profile
Medal record
Women's badminton
Representing Indonesia
Uber Cup
Bronze medal – third place	2026 Horsens	Women's team
Asian Games
Bronze medal – third place	2026 Aichi–Nagoya	Women's team
Asia Team Championships
Bronze medal – third place	2026 Qingdao	Women's team
SEA Games
Silver medal – second place	2025 Thailand	Women's team
Bronze medal – third place	2025 Thailand	Women's doubles

Febi Setianingrum (born 29 February 2004) is an Indonesian badminton player affiliated with Djarum club. She was invited to be part of Indonesia's national badminton team in 2022. She is the sister of fellow badminton athlete, Jafar Hidayatullah.

== Career ==
=== 2022 ===
In June, Setianingrum with Nethania Irawan won the Lithuanian International after beating fellow Indonesian pair Sofy Al Mushira Asharunissa and Ridya Aulia Fatasya in the final.

In October, Setianingrum was paired with Jesita Putri Miantoro and lost in the semi-finals of Indonesia Masters Super 100 from 5th seed Japanese pair Rena Miyaura and Ayako Sakuramoto.

=== 2023 ===
Setianingrum and her partner Jesita Putri Miantoro opened the 2023 season at Iran Fajr International. They won the title defeating Malaysian pair Go Pei Kee and Teoh Mei Xing. In March, they lost in the final of Vietnam International from Korean pair Lee Yu-lim and Shin Seung-chan.

In September, they won the Indonesia International tournament in Medan, defeating her juniors pair Velisha Christina and Bernadine Wardana in straight games. In the next tournament, they competed at the Indonesia Masters Super 100 I but lost at the quarter-finals from 2nd seed and eventual finalist Chinese Taipei player Chang Ching-hui and Yang Ching-tun in straight games.

=== 2025 ===
In August, the Indonesian Badminton Association reshuffled all of the women's doubles pairs in the senior team, in which Setianingrum was paired with Rachel Allessya Rose. Their first tournament together was the Hong Kong Open, where they lost in three games against seniors Apriyani Rahayu and Siti Fadia Silva Ramadhanti in the first round. Setianingrum and Rose had to fall through the European tournaments against more seasoned pairs, namely Rin Iwanaga and Kie Nakanishi at the Arctic Open; Pearly Tan and Thinaah Muralitharan at the Denmark Open; and Baek Ha-na and Lee So-hee at the French Open, where the Indonesians managed to take one game.

Entering their Super 500 debut at the Australian Open, Setianingrum and Rose created the first ever all-Indonesian women's doubles final at a Super 500 tournament and above, after reaching the finals with compatriots Febriana Dwipuji Kusuma and Meilysa Trias Puspita Sari. In a tense final match lasting for 109 minutes, Setianingrum and Rose emerged as champions, thus sealing their first ever Super 500 title. In December, Setianingrum made her debut at the SEA Games. Playing as the first women's doubles with Rose in the team event, they managed to help the team reach the final, but were defeated by defending champions Thailand, securing the silver medal.

=== 2026 ===
Setianingrum made her debut at the Asian Games in 2026 Aichi–Nagoya, winning a bronze medal in the women's team event. In the individual women's doubles, she and her partner Rose were knocked out in the early rounds by the Malaysian pair Pearly Tan and Thinaah Muralitharan.

== Achievements ==
=== SEA Games ===
Women's doubles
Year	Venue	Partner	Opponent	Score	Result	Ref.
2025	Gymnasium 4, Thammasat University Rangsit Campus; Pathum Thani, Thailand	(Indonesia) Rachel Allessya Rose	(Malaysia) Pearly Tan (Malaysia) Thinaah Muralitharan	14–21, 21–19, 16–21	Bronze	

=== BWF World Tour (3 titles, 1 runner-up) ===
The BWF World Tour, which was announced on 19 March 2017 and implemented in 2018, is a series of elite badminton tournaments sanctioned by the Badminton World Federation (BWF). The BWF World Tours are divided into levels of World Tour Finals, Super 1000, Super 750, Super 500, Super 300, and the BWF Tour Super 100.

Women's doubles
Year	Tournament	Level	Partner	Opponent	Score	Result	Ref.
2024	Kaohsiung Masters	Super 100	(Indonesia) Jesita Putri Miantoro	(Chinese Taipei) Sung Shuo-yun (Chinese Taipei) Yu Chien-hui	21–14, 21–18	(gold) Winner	
2024 (I)	Indonesia Masters	Super 100	(Indonesia) Jesita Putri Miantoro	(Japan) Mizuki Otake (Japan) Miyu Takahashi	21–15, 21–13	(gold) Winner	
2024	Taipei Open	Super 300	(Indonesia) Jesita Putri Miantoro	(Indonesia) Febriana Dwipuji Kusuma (Indonesia) Amallia Cahaya Pratiwi	15–21, 16–21	(silver) Runner-up	
2025	Australian Open	Super 500	(Indonesia) Rachel Allessya Rose	(Indonesia) Febriana Dwipuji Kusuma (Indonesia) Meilysa Trias Puspita Sari	18–21, 21–19, 23–21	(gold) Winner	

=== BWF International Challenge/Series (3 titles, 1 runner-up) ===
Women's doubles
Year	Tournament	Partner	Opponent	Score	Result	Ref.
2022	Lithuanian International	(Indonesia) Nethania Irawan	(Indonesia) Sofy Al Mushira Asharunissa (Indonesia) Ridya Aulia Fatasya	21–10, 23–21	(gold) Winner	
2023	Iran Fajr International	(Indonesia) Jesita Putri Miantoro	(Malaysia) Go Pei Kee (Malaysia) Teoh Mei Xing	20–22, 21–16, 21–17	(gold) Winner	
2023	Vietnam International	(Indonesia) Jesita Putri Miantoro	(South Korea) Lee Yu-lim (South Korea) Shin Seung-chan	18–21, 10–21	(silver) Runner-up	
2023 (I)	Indonesia International	(Indonesia) Jesita Putri Miantoro	(Indonesia) Velisha Christina (Indonesia) Bernadine Wardana	21–17, 21–11	(gold) Winner	

BWF International Challenge tournament
BWF International Series tournament
BWF Future Series tournament

== Performance timeline ==
Key

W	Won	F	Finalist	SF	Semi-finalist
QF	Quarter-finalist	#R	Rounds 4, 3, 2, 1	RR	Round-robin stage
Q#	Qualification round	A	Absent	w/d	Withdrew
G	Gold	S	Silver	B	Bronze
NH	Not held	N/A	Not applicable	DNQ	Did not qualify

=== National team ===
- Senior level

Team events	2025	2026	Ref
SEA Games	S	NH	
Asia Team Championships	NH	B	
Asian Games	NH	B	
Uber Cup	NH	B	

=== Individual competitions ===
==== Senior level ====
===== Women's doubles =====
Event	2025	2026	Ref
SEA Games	B	NH	
Asian Championships	A	QF	
Asian Games	NH	1R	
World Championships	DNQ	QF	

Tournament	BWF World Tour					Best	Ref
Tournament	2022	2023	2024	2025	2026	Best	Ref
Indonesia Masters	A		2R	A	SF	SF ('26)	
Thailand Masters	A		QF	A	QF	QF ('24, '26)	
All England Open	A				1R	1R ('26)	
Swiss Open	A		2R	A	1R	2R ('24)	
Orléans Masters	A				SF	SF ('26)	
Thailand Open	A			1R	A	1R ('25)	
Malaysia Masters	A			SF	A	SF ('25)	
Indonesia Open	A		1R	2R	SF	SF ('26)	
Australian Open	A			W	SF	W ('25)	
Macau Open	NH		2R	QF	A	QF ('25)	
Japan Open	A				1R	1R ('26)	
China Open	NH	A			QF	QF ('26)	
Taipei Open	A		F	2R	A	F ('24)	
Korea Masters	A		1R	A		1R ('24)	
China Masters	NH	A		2R	A	2R ('25)	
Indonesia Masters Super 100	SF	QF	W	A		W ('24 I)	
Indonesia Masters Super 100	SF	SF	A			W ('24 I)	
Arctic Open	NH	A		2R	A	2R ('25)	
Denmark Open	A			1R	2R	2R ('26)	
French Open	A			2R	SF	SF ('26)	
Hylo Open	A				1R	1R ('26)	
Japan Masters	NH	A	1R	A	w/d	1R ('24)	
Kaohsiung Masters	NH	A	W	A		W ('24)	
Hong Kong Open	NH	A		1R	A	1R ('25)	
Guwahati Masters	NH	QF	A			QF ('23)	
Odisha Masters	A	SF	A			SF ('23)	
Spain Masters	NH	A	1R	NH		1R ('24)	
Year-end ranking	151	43	33	59		6	
Tournament	2022	2023	2024	2025	2026	Best	Ref
