= 2024 Taipei Open =

Tournament details
- Dates: 3–8 September
- Edition: 41st
- Level: Super 300
- Total prize money: US$210,000
- Venue: Taipei Arena
- Location: Taipei, Taiwan

Champions
- Men's singles: (Chinese Taipei) Lin Chun-yi
- Women's singles: (South Korea) Sim Yu-jin
- Men's doubles: (Chinese Taipei) Lee Jhe-huei (Chinese Taipei) Yang Po-hsuan
- Women's doubles: (Indonesia) Febriana Dwipuji Kusuma (Indonesia) Amallia Cahaya Pratiwi
- Mixed doubles: (Thailand) Pakkapon Teeraratsakul (Thailand) Phataimas Muenwong

The 2024 Taipei Open (officially known as the Yonex Taipei Open 2024) was a badminton tournament which took place at Taipei Arena in Taipei, Taiwan, from 3 to 8 September 2024 and had a total purse of $210,000.

== Tournament ==
The 2024 Taipei Open was the twenty-fourth tournament of the 2024 BWF World Tour and also part of the Taipei Open championships, which had been held since 1980. This tournament was organized by the Chinese Taipei Badminton Association with sanction from the BWF.

=== Venue ===
This international tournament was held at Taipei Arena, in Taipei, Taiwan.

=== Point distribution ===
Below is the point distribution table for each phase of the tournament based on the BWF points system for the BWF World Tour Super 300 event.

Winner	Runner-up	3/4	5/8	9/16	17/32	33/64	65/128
7,000	5,950	4,900	3,850	2,750	1,670	660	320

=== Prize pool ===
The total prize money was US$210,000 with the distribution of the prize money in accordance with BWF regulations.

Event	Winner	Finalist	Semi-finals	Quarter-finals	Last 16
Singles	$15,750	$7,980	$3,045	$1,260	$735
Doubles	$16,590	$7,980	$2,940	$1,522.50	$787.50

== Men's singles ==
=== Seeds ===
1. (Chinese Taipei) Chou Tien-chen (semi-finals)
2. (Chinese Taipei) Lin Chun-yi (champion)
3. (Chinese Taipei) Wang Tzu-wei (quarter-finals)
4. (Chinese Taipei) Lee Chia-hao (semi-finals)
5. (Chinese Taipei) Su Li-yang (second round)
6. (India) Kiran George (first round)
7. (Thailand) Kantaphon Wangcharoen (first round)
8. (South Korea) Jeon Hyeok-jin (second round)

=== Finals ===
Semi-finals
1	(Chinese Taipei) Chou Tien-chen	21	11	17
(Chinese Taipei) Chi Yu-jen	19	21	21
4	(Chinese Taipei) Lee Chia-hao	12	19
2	(Chinese Taipei) Lin Chun-yi	21	21

Final
(Chinese Taipei) Chi Yu-jen	17	13
2	(Chinese Taipei) Lin Chun-yi	21	21

=== Top half ===
==== Section 1 ====
First round
1	(Chinese Taipei) Chou T-c	21	21
(Thailand) S Jamsri	13	13
(Malaysia) Soong J V	21	21
Q2	(Malaysia) Tan J J	18	11
6	(India) K George	21	8	16
(Indonesia) Y S Marcellyno	15	21	21
(France) A Merklé	21	14	13
(Malaysia) J Hoh	10	21	21

Second round
1	(Chinese Taipei) Chou T-c	21	21
(Malaysia) Soong J V	8	17
(Indonesia) Y S Marcellyno	21	9	14
(Malaysia) J Hoh	12	21	21

Quarter-finals
1	(Chinese Taipei) Chou T-c	21	21
(Malaysia) J Hoh	12	14

==== Section 2 ====
First round
3	(Chinese Taipei) Wang T-w	22	9	21
Q1	(Hong Kong) Chan Y C	20	21	19
Q4	(Chinese Taipei) Cheng K	17	21	9
(Hong Kong) J Gunawan	21	18	21
5	(Chinese Taipei) Su L-y	21	21
Q3	(Chinese Taipei) Chen C-t	13	13
(Malaysia) Cheam J W	19	13
(Chinese Taipei) Chi Y-j	21	21

Second round
3	(Chinese Taipei) Wang T-w	21	21
(Hong Kong) J Gunawan	14	15
5	(Chinese Taipei) Su L-y	16	21	12
(Chinese Taipei) Chi Y-j	21	18	21

Quarter-finals
3	(Chinese Taipei) Wang T-w	14	10
(Chinese Taipei) Chi Y-j	21	21

=== Bottom half ===
==== Section 3 ====
First round
(Chinese Taipei) Huang Y-k	21	15	17
(Thailand) Pan Teeraratsakul	19	21	21
(Singapore) J Teh	8	21	17
8	(South Korea) Jeon H-j	21	18	21
(Indonesia) A Farhan	21	21
(Kazakhstan) D Panarin	14	14
(Canada) V Lai	13	12
4	(Chinese Taipei) Lee C-h	21	21

Second round
(Thailand) Pan Teeraratsakul	21	16	21
8	(South Korea) Jeon H-j	19	21	16
(Indonesia) A Farhan	21	20	17
4	(Chinese Taipei) Lee C-h	18	22	21

Quarter-finals
(Thailand) Pan Teeraratsakul	21	13	15
4	(Chinese Taipei) Lee C-h	14	21	21

==== Section 4 ====
First round
(Chinese Taipei) Kuo K-l	21	21
(Chinese Taipei) Wang P-w	6	10
(India) S Karunakaran	24	23
7	(Thailand) K Wangcharoen	22	21
(India) S Subramanian	21	19	21
(Finland) J Oldorff	12	21	11
(Chinese Taipei) Liao J-f	17	24	19
2	(Chinese Taipei) Lin C-y	21	22	21

Second round
(Chinese Taipei) Kuo K-l	21	21
(India) S Karunakaran	19	19
(India) S Subramanian	22	12
2	(Chinese Taipei) Lin C-y	24	21

Quarter-finals
(Chinese Taipei) Kuo K-l	19	12
2	(Chinese Taipei) Lin C-y	21	21

== Women's singles ==
=== Seeds ===
1. (Chinese Taipei) Tai Tzu-ying (quarter-finals)
2. (India) P. V. Sindhu (withdrew)
3. (Chinese Taipei) Hsu Wen-chi (second round)
4. (Chinese Taipei) Sung Shuo-yun (first round)
5. (Japan) Natsuki Nidaira (quarter-finals)
6. (Chinese Taipei) Pai Yu-po (quarter-finals)
7. (Indonesia) Putri Kusuma Wardani (final)
8. (South Korea) Sim Yu-jin (champion)

=== Finals ===
Semi-finals
7	(Indonesia) Putri Kusuma Wardani	16	21	21
(Chinese Taipei) Chiu Pin-chian	21	16	11
(Japan) Kaoru Sugiyama	21	11	13
8	(South Korea) Sim Yu-jin	19	21	21

Final
7	(Indonesia) Putri Kusuma Wardani	17	13
8	(South Korea) Sim Yu-jin	21	21

=== Top half ===
==== Section 1 ====
First round
1	(Chinese Taipei) Tai T-y	21	21
(India) T Hemanth	11	10
Q1	(Chinese Taipei) Yang Y-c	21	21
(Hungary) Á Kőrösi	8	10
7	(Indonesia) P K Wardani	21	21	21
PFQ	(South Korea) Kim G-r	23	16	13
PFQ	(Malaysia) Kisona S	21	21
(Myanmar) Thet Htar T	17	17

Second round
1	(Chinese Taipei) Tai T-y	21	21
Q1	(Chinese Taipei) Yang Y-c	16	17
7	(Indonesia) P K Wardani	21	21
PFQ	(Malaysia) Kisona S	8	16

Quarter-finals
1	(Chinese Taipei) Tai T-y	21	16	22
7	(Indonesia) P K Wardani	18	21	24

==== Section 2 ====
First round
4	(Chinese Taipei) Sung S-y	13	15
(Chinese Taipei) Chiu P-c	21	21
(India) A Upadhyaya	21	19	11
(United States) L Lam	17	21	21
5	(Japan) N Nidaira	21	21
(Canada) R Chan	12	13
PFQ	(Chinese Taipei) Huang C-p	21	21
(Chinese Taipei) Huang Y-h	17	15

Second round
(Chinese Taipei) Chiu P-c	22	21
(United States) L Lam	20	16
5	(Japan) N Nidaira	20	21	21
PFQ	(Chinese Taipei) Huang C-p	22	10	10

Quarter-finals
(Chinese Taipei) Chiu P-c	15	21	21
5	(Japan) N Nidaira	21	19	16

=== Bottom half ===
==== Section 3 ====
First round
Q2	(Thailand) T Nithiittikrai	11	22
(Japan) K Sugiyama	21	24
(India) A Kashyap	19	18
SWM	(Thailand) P Choeikeewong	21	21
(Chinese Taipei) Lin S-y	6	7
Q4	(Chinese Taipei) Hung Y-t	21	21
PFQ	(Chinese Taipei) Lee Y-h	12	7
6	(Chinese Taipei) Pai Y-p	21	21

Second round
(Japan) K Sugiyama	21	21
SWM	(Thailand) P Choeikeewong	11	6
Q4	(Chinese Taipei) Hung Y-t	12	19
6	(Chinese Taipei) Pai Y-p	21	21

Quarter-finals
(Japan) K Sugiyama	21	21
6	(Chinese Taipei) Pai Y-p	19	13

==== Section 4 ====
First round
(Chinese Taipei) Liang T-y	21	21
(Indonesia) K A C Dewi	15	15
(Chinese Taipei) Lin H-t	19	21	15
8	(South Korea) Sim Y-j	21	15	21
PFQ	(India) R Ramraj	19	13
(Japan) A Takahashi	21	21
Q3	(South Korea) Kim J-e	19	20
3	(Chinese Taipei) Hsu W-c	21	22

Second round
(Chinese Taipei) Liang T-y	13	21	12
8	(South Korea) Sim Y-j	21	17	21
(Japan) A Takahashi	13	21	21
3	(Chinese Taipei) Hsu W-c	21	15	18

Quarter-finals
8	(South Korea) Sim Y-j	21	21
(Japan) A Takahashi	15	13

== Men's doubles ==
=== Seeds ===
1. (Chinese Taipei) Lee Yang / Wang Chi-lin (second round)
2. (Chinese Taipei) Lee Jhe-huei / Yang Po-hsuan (champions)
3. (Chinese Taipei) Lee Fang-chih / Lee Fang-jen (first round)
4. (Thailand) Peeratchai Sukphun / Pakkapon Teeraratsakul (second round)
5. (Chinese Taipei) Lin Bing-wei / Su Ching-heng (quarter-finals)
6. (South Korea) Choi Sol-gyu / Heo Kwang-hee (first round)
7. (United States) Chen Zhi Yi / Presley Smith (first round)
8. (Chinese Taipei) Chen Cheng-kuan / Chen Sheng-fa (first round)

=== Finals ===
Semi-finals
(Chinese Taipei) Liu Kuang-heng (Chinese Taipei) Yang Po-han	17	19
(Chinese Taipei) Chiang Chien-wei (Chinese Taipei) Wu Hsuan-yi	21	21
(France) Éloi Adam (France) Léo Rossi	10	11
2	(Chinese Taipei) Lee Jhe-huei (Chinese Taipei) Yang Po-hsuan	21	21

Final
(Chinese Taipei) Chiang Chien-wei (Chinese Taipei) Wu Hsuan-yi	7	23
2	(Chinese Taipei) Lee Jhe-huei (Chinese Taipei) Yang Po-hsuan	21	25

=== Top half ===
==== Section 1 ====
First round
1	(Chinese Taipei) Lee Y (Chinese Taipei) Wang C-l	21	21
(France) M Cattoen (France) L Renoir	7	9
(Chinese Taipei) Liu K-h (Chinese Taipei) Yang P-ha	21	15	21
(Chinese Taipei) Lu C-y (Chinese Taipei) Wei C-w	15	21	10
6	(South Korea) Choi S-g (South Korea) Heo K-h	21	15	10
(Chinese Taipei) Chang K-c (Chinese Taipei) Chen X-y	18	21	21
(Malaysia) Kang K X (Malaysia) A Tai	21	21
Q1	(Chinese Taipei) Chang K-h (Chinese Taipei) Wu G-x	15	17

Second round
1	(Chinese Taipei) Lee Y (Chinese Taipei) Wang C-l	21	15	20
(Chinese Taipei) Liu K-h (Chinese Taipei) Yang P-ha	15	21	22
(Chinese Taipei) Chang K-c (Chinese Taipei) Chen X-y	10	21	21
(Malaysia) Kang K X (Malaysia) A Tai	21	14	15

Quarter-finals
(Chinese Taipei) Liu K-h (Chinese Taipei) Yang P-ha	21	21
(Chinese Taipei) Chang K-c (Chinese Taipei) Chen X-y	17	13

==== Section 2 ====
First round
4	(Thailand) P Sukphun (Thailand) Pak Teeraratsakul	21	21
(Australia) K M Edison (Australia) J Yu	11	11
(Chinese Taipei) Chiang C-w (Chinese Taipei) Wu H-y	21	21
Q4	(Chinese Taipei) Lai P-y (Chinese Taipei) Tsai F-c	19	17
8	(Chinese Taipei) Chen C-k (Chinese Taipei) Chen S-f	21	10	17
(Indonesia) R Hidayat (Indonesia) Y Rambitan	18	21	21
(Chinese Taipei) Chiu H-c (Chinese Taipei) Chiu S-h	21	21
(Japan) T Nomura (Japan) Y Shimogami	18	13

Second round
4	(Thailand) P Sukphun (Thailand) Pak Teeraratsakul	19	17
(Chinese Taipei) Chiang C-w (Chinese Taipei) Wu H-y	21	21
(Indonesia) R Hidayat (Indonesia) Y Rambitan	10	15
(Chinese Taipei) Chiu H-c (Chinese Taipei) Chiu S-h	21	21

Quarter-finals
(Chinese Taipei) Chiang C-w (Chinese Taipei) Wu H-y	23	21
(Chinese Taipei) Chiu H-c (Chinese Taipei) Chiu S-h	21	15

=== Bottom half ===
==== Section 3 ====
First round
Q2	(Chinese Taipei) Chan Y-l (Chinese Taipei) Chu B-r	12	16
(Chinese Taipei) Lu M-c (Chinese Taipei) Tang K-w	21	21
(Chinese Taipei) Bao Xin D G L W (Chinese Taipei) Tseng P-c	11	19
5	(Chinese Taipei) Lin B-w (Chinese Taipei) Su C-h	21	21
(Thailand) P Thongkham (Thailand) W Thongkham	14	15
(France) É Adam (France) L Rossi	21	21
(Chinese Taipei) Chen Z-r (Chinese Taipei) Lin Y-c	21	12	21
3	(Chinese Taipei) Lee F-c (Chinese Taipei) Lee F-j	17	21	19

Second round
(Chinese Taipei) Lu M-c (Chinese Taipei) Tang K-w	19	21	19
5	(Chinese Taipei) Lin B-w (Chinese Taipei) Su C-h	21	9	21
(France) É Adam (France) L Rossi	21	15	21
(Chinese Taipei) Chen Z-r (Chinese Taipei) Lin Y-c	19	21	15

Quarter-finals
5	(Chinese Taipei) Lin B-w (Chinese Taipei) Su C-h	11	19
(France) É Adam (France) L Rossi	21	21

==== Section 4 ====
First round
Q3	(Chinese Taipei) Lin C-y (Chinese Taipei) Lin Y-s	21	21
(Malaysia) Boon X Y (Malaysia) Goh V S	14	16
(Malaysia) Lau Y S (Malaysia) Lee Y B	21	21
7	(United States) Chen Z-y (United States) P Smith	17	13
(Hong Kong) Law C H (Hong Kong) Yeung S C	12	16
(Malaysia) N M Azriyn Ayub (Malaysia) Tan W K	21	21
(Chinese Taipei) Lu C (Chinese Taipei) Po L-w	8	17
2	(Chinese Taipei) Lee J-h (Chinese Taipei) Yang P-hs	21	21

Second round
Q3	(Chinese Taipei) Lin C-y (Chinese Taipei) Lin Y-s	22	21
(Malaysia) Lau Y S (Malaysia) Lee Y B	20	11
(Malaysia) N M Azriyn Ayub (Malaysia) Tan W K	13	13
2	(Chinese Taipei) Lee J-h (Chinese Taipei) Yang P-hs	21	21

Quarter-finals
Q3	(Chinese Taipei) Lin C-y (Chinese Taipei) Lin Y-s	10	8
2	(Chinese Taipei) Lee J-h (Chinese Taipei) Yang P-hs	21	21

== Women's doubles ==
=== Seeds ===
1. (Thailand) Benyapa Aimsaard / Nuntakarn Aimsaard (semi-finals)
2. (Indonesia) Febriana Dwipuji Kusuma / Amallia Cahaya Pratiwi (champions)
3. (Thailand) Laksika Kanlaha / Phataimas Muenwong (semi-finals)
4. (Chinese Taipei) Chang Ching-hui / Yang Ching-tun (quarter-finals)
5. (Chinese Taipei) Sung Shuo-yun / Yu Chien-hui (first round)
6. (Chinese Taipei) Hsu Yin-hui / Lin Jhih-yun (first round)
7. (Indonesia) Jesita Putri Miantoro / Febi Setianingrum (final)
8. (India) Rutaparna Panda / Swetaparna Panda (first round)

=== Finals ===
Semi-finals
1	(Thailand) Benyapa Aimsaard (Thailand) Nuntakarn Aimsaard	21	9	18
7	(Indonesia) Jesita Putri Miantoro (Indonesia) Febi Setianingrum	17	21	21
3	(Thailand) Laksika Kanlaha (Thailand) Phataimas Muenwong	23	16
2	(Indonesia) Febriana Dwipuji Kusuma (Indonesia) Amallia Cahaya Pratiwi	25	21

Final
7	(Indonesia) Jesita Putri Miantoro (Indonesia) Febi Setianingrum	15	16
2	(Indonesia) Febriana Dwipuji Kusuma (Indonesia) Amallia Cahaya Pratiwi	21	21

=== Top half ===
==== Section 1 ====
First round
1	(Thailand) B Aimsaard (Thailand) N Aimsaard	21	21
Q3	(Chinese Taipei) Chou Y-a (Chinese Taipei) Huang K-x	15	5
(Chinese Taipei) Hsu Y-c (Chinese Taipei) Sung Y-h	21	21
(Sweden) M Sjöö (Sweden) T Sjöö	19	15
6	(Chinese Taipei) Hsu Y-h (Chinese Taipei) Lin J-y	16	21	24
(Australia) N Shimizu (Australia) G Somerville	21	17	26
Q4	(Chinese Taipei) Tsai R-l (Chinese Taipei) Wang Y-z	9	10
Q1	(Chinese Taipei) Hu L-f (Chinese Taipei) Jheng Y-c	21	21

Second round
1	(Thailand) B Aimsaard (Thailand) N Aimsaard	21	21
(Chinese Taipei) Hsu Y-c (Chinese Taipei) Sung Y-h	10	18
(Australia) N Shimizu (Australia) G Somerville	21	18	21
Q1	(Chinese Taipei) Hu L-f (Chinese Taipei) Jheng Y-c	17	21	16

Quarter-finals
1	(Thailand) B Aimsaard (Thailand) N Aimsaard	21	21
(Australia) N Shimizu (Australia) G Somerville	14	12

==== Section 2 ====
First round
4	(Chinese Taipei) Chang C-h (Chinese Taipei) Yang C-t	15	21	21
(Chinese Taipei) Hsieh P-s (Chinese Taipei) Hung E-t	21	11	11
(Chinese Taipei) N G Chan (Chinese Taipei) Yang C-y	19	18
(Chinese Taipei) Lin W-c (Chinese Taipei) Liu C-y	21	21
7	(Indonesia) J P Miantoro (Indonesia) F Setianingrum	21	21
(Chinese Taipei) Lee C-c (Chinese Taipei) Lin Y-y	14	17
(Chinese Taipei) Hsieh M-y (Chinese Taipei) Hsieh Y-t	21	10	6
(Chinese Taipei) Lin X-m (Chinese Taipei) Wang Y-q	15	21	21

Second round
4	(Chinese Taipei) Chang C-h (Chinese Taipei) Yang C-t	21	21
(Chinese Taipei) Lin W-c (Chinese Taipei) Liu C-y	16	15
7	(Indonesia) J P Miantoro (Indonesia) F Setianingrum	21	21
(Chinese Taipei) Lin X-m (Chinese Taipei) Wang Y-q	18	15

Quarter-finals
4	(Chinese Taipei) Chang C-h (Chinese Taipei) Yang C-t	19	18
7	(Indonesia) J P Miantoro (Indonesia) F Setianingrum	21	21

=== Bottom half ===
==== Section 3 ====
First round
(Chinese Taipei) Lin C-c (Chinese Taipei) Teng C-h	21	23
(Hong Kong) Leung Y Y (Hong Kong) Ng W Y	12	21
(Hong Kong) Lui L L (Hong Kong) Tsang H Y	21	21
8	(India) R Panda (India) S Panda	12	16
(Chinese Taipei) Chiu P-c (Chinese Taipei) Tung C-t	12	15
(Chinese Taipei) Chen Y-f (Chinese Taipei) Sun L-c	21	21
(Chinese Taipei) Cheng Y-p (Chinese Taipei) Sun Y-h	7	21	14
3	(Thailand) L Kanlaha (Thailand) P Muenwong	21	16	21

Second round
(Chinese Taipei) Lin C-c (Chinese Taipei) Teng C-h	17	20
(Hong Kong) Lui L L (Hong Kong) Tsang H Y	21	22
(Chinese Taipei) Chen Y-f (Chinese Taipei) Sun L-c	16	22	15
3	(Thailand) L Kanlaha (Thailand) P Muenwong	21	20	21

Quarter-finals
(Hong Kong) Lui L L (Hong Kong) Tsang H Y	14	7
3	(Thailand) L Kanlaha (Thailand) P Muenwong	21	21

==== Section 4 ====
First round
(Chinese Taipei) Hung H-e (Chinese Taipei) Hung Y-e	14	12
(Indonesia) L T Mayasari (Indonesia) R A Rose	21	21
(Japan) M Otake (Japan) M Takahashi	21	21
5	(Chinese Taipei) Sung S-y (Chinese Taipei) Yu C-h	18	16
Q2	(Chinese Taipei) Lee Y-h (Chinese Taipei) Wang Y-y	18	14
(Hong Kong) Fan K Y (Hong Kong) Yau M Y	21	21
(Chinese Taipei) Chen Y-h (Chinese Taipei) Lin Y-h	18	9
2	(Indonesia) F D Kusuma (Indonesia) A C Pratiwi	21	21

Second round
(Indonesia) L T Mayasari (Indonesia) R A Rose	12	14
(Japan) M Otake (Japan) M Takahashi	21	21
(Hong Kong) Fan K Y (Hong Kong) Yau M Y	11	2
2	(Indonesia) F D Kusuma (Indonesia) A C Pratiwi	21	21

Quarter-finals
(Japan) M Otake (Japan) M Takahashi	14	21	9
2	(Indonesia) F D Kusuma (Indonesia) A C Pratiwi	21	19	21

== Mixed doubles ==
=== Seeds ===
1. (Chinese Taipei) Ye Hong-wei / Lee Chia-hsin (semi-finals)
2. (Chinese Taipei) Yang Po-hsuan / Hu Ling-fang (final)
3. (Thailand) Ruttanapak Oupthong / Jhenicha Sudjaipraparat (first round)
4. (Thailand) Pakkapon Teeraratsakul / Phataimas Muenwong (champions)
5. (India) Sathish Kumar Karunakaran / Aadya Variyath (first round)
6. (Chinese Taipei) Chen Cheng-kuan / Hsu Yin-hui (second round)
7. (Japan) Yuichi Shimogami / Sayaka Hobara (first round)
8. (Chinese Taipei) Lu Ming-che / Hung En-tzu (quarter-finals)

=== Finals ===
Semi-finals
1	(Chinese Taipei) Ye Hong-wei (Chinese Taipei) Lee Chia-hsin	19	0^{r}
4	(Thailand) Pakkapon Teeraratsakul (Thailand) Phataimas Muenwong	21	0
(Chinese Taipei) Lai Po-yu (Chinese Taipei) Lin Xiao-min	7	17
2	(Chinese Taipei) Yang Po-hsuan (Chinese Taipei) Hu Ling-fang	21	21

Final
4	(Thailand) Pakkapon Teeraratsakul (Thailand) Phataimas Muenwong	21	21
2	(Chinese Taipei) Yang Po-hsuan (Chinese Taipei) Hu Ling-fang	17	19

=== Top half ===
==== Section 1 ====
First round
1	(Chinese Taipei) Ye H-w (Chinese Taipei) Lee C-hs	21	22
Q4	(Chinese Taipei) Tseng M-h (Chinese Taipei) Hsieh P-s	11	20
(Chinese Taipei) Chen Ze-r (Chinese Taipei) Wang S-m	16	17
(Chinese Taipei) Chiu H-c (Chinese Taipei) Lin J-y	21	21
5	(India) S Karunakaran (India) A Variyath	21	20	18
(Hong Kong) Lui C W (Hong Kong) Fu C Y	19	22	21
(Malaysia) Wong T C (Malaysia) Lim C S	17	15
(Chinese Taipei) Lin B-w (Chinese Taipei) Lin C-c	21	21

Second round
1	(Chinese Taipei) Ye H-w (Chinese Taipei) Lee C-hs	21	23
(Chinese Taipei) Chiu H-c (Chinese Taipei) Lin J-y	12	21
(Hong Kong) Lui C W (Hong Kong) Fu C Y	15	21	15
(Chinese Taipei) Lin B-w (Chinese Taipei) Lin C-c	21	19	21

Quarter-finals
1	(Chinese Taipei) Ye H-w (Chinese Taipei) Lee C-hs	21	21
(Chinese Taipei) Lin B-w (Chinese Taipei) Lin C-c	19	14

==== Section 2 ====
First round
4	(Thailand) Pak Teeraratsakul (Thailand) P Muenwong	21	21
(India) A Surya (India) A Pramuthesh	13	19
Q3	(Chinese Taipei) Huang J-h (Chinese Taipei) Sung Y-h	21	12	13
(Chinese Taipei) Chen S-f (Chinese Taipei) Tsai R-l	17	21	21
7	(Japan) Y Shimogami (Japan) S Hobara	21	15
(Chinese Taipei) Chang K-c (Chinese Taipei) Lin Y-y	23	21
(India) D Kapila (India) T Crasto	21	13	21
(Chinese Taipei) Liao C-p (Chinese Taipei) Lin Y-h	17	21	16

Second round
4	(Thailand) Pak Teeraratsakul (Thailand) P Muenwong	21	21
(Chinese Taipei) Chen S-f (Chinese Taipei) Tsai R-l	9	11
(Chinese Taipei) Chang K-c (Chinese Taipei) Lin Y-y	13	20
(India) D Kapila (India) T Crasto	21	22

Quarter-finals
4	(Thailand) Pak Teeraratsakul (Thailand) P Muenwong	22	21
(India) D Kapila (India) T Crasto	20	12

=== Bottom half ===
==== Section 3 ====
First round
(Chinese Taipei) Chen Z-r (Chinese Taipei) Yang C-t	18	17
(Macau) Leong I C (Macau) Ng W C	21	21
(Chinese Taipei) Wei C-w (Chinese Taipei) N G Chan	16	16
8	(Chinese Taipei) Lu M-c (Chinese Taipei) Hung E-t	21	21
(Chinese Taipei) Lai P-y (Chinese Taipei) Lin X-m	19	21	21
Q2	(Chinese Taipei) He Z-w (Chinese Taipei) Chen Y-f	21	16	14
(Chinese Taipei) Chen B-y (Chinese Taipei) Sun L-c	21	21
3	(Thailand) R Oupthong (Thailand) J Sudjaipraparat	19	18

Second round
(Macau) Leong I C (Macau) Ng W C	11	17
8	(Chinese Taipei) Lu M-c (Chinese Taipei) Hung E-t	21	21
(Chinese Taipei) Lai P-y (Chinese Taipei) Lin X-m	21	21
(Chinese Taipei) Chen B-y (Chinese Taipei) Sun L-c	12	17

Quarter-finals
8	(Chinese Taipei) Lu M-c (Chinese Taipei) Hung E-t	22	21	17
(Chinese Taipei) Lai P-y (Chinese Taipei) Lin X-m	24	18	21

==== Section 4 ====
First round
(Chinese Taipei) Wu H-y (Chinese Taipei) Yang C-y	21	21
(Chinese Taipei) Lin Y-c (Chinese Taipei) Wang Y-z	16	18
(Chinese Taipei) Cheng K-w (Chinese Taipei) Liu C-y	21	14	13
6	(Chinese Taipei) Chen C-k (Chinese Taipei) Hsu Y-h	19	21	21
(Chinese Taipei) Lu C (Chinese Taipei) Lee C-c	12	20
(Chinese Taipei) Po L-w (Chinese Taipei) Chang C-h	21	22
Q1	(Hong Kong) Hung K C (Hong Kong) Tsang H Y	12	11
2	(Chinese Taipei) Yang P-hs (Chinese Taipei) Hu L-f	21	21

Second round
(Chinese Taipei) Wu H-y (Chinese Taipei) Yang C-y	21	21
6	(Chinese Taipei) Chen C-k (Chinese Taipei) Hsu Y-h	14	16
(Chinese Taipei) Po L-w (Chinese Taipei) Chang C-h	10	11
2	(Chinese Taipei) Yang P-hs (Chinese Taipei) Hu L-f	21	21

Quarter-finals
(Chinese Taipei) Wu H-y (Chinese Taipei) Yang C-y	17	21	16
2	(Chinese Taipei) Yang P-hs (Chinese Taipei) Hu L-f	21	19	21

Preceded by 2024 Korea Open; 2024 Indonesia Masters Super 100 I	BWF World Tour; 2024 BWF season	Succeeded by 2024 Hong Kong Open; 2024 Vietnam Open
