= Sim Yu-jin =

South Korean badminton player (born 1999)

Sim Yu-jin 심유진
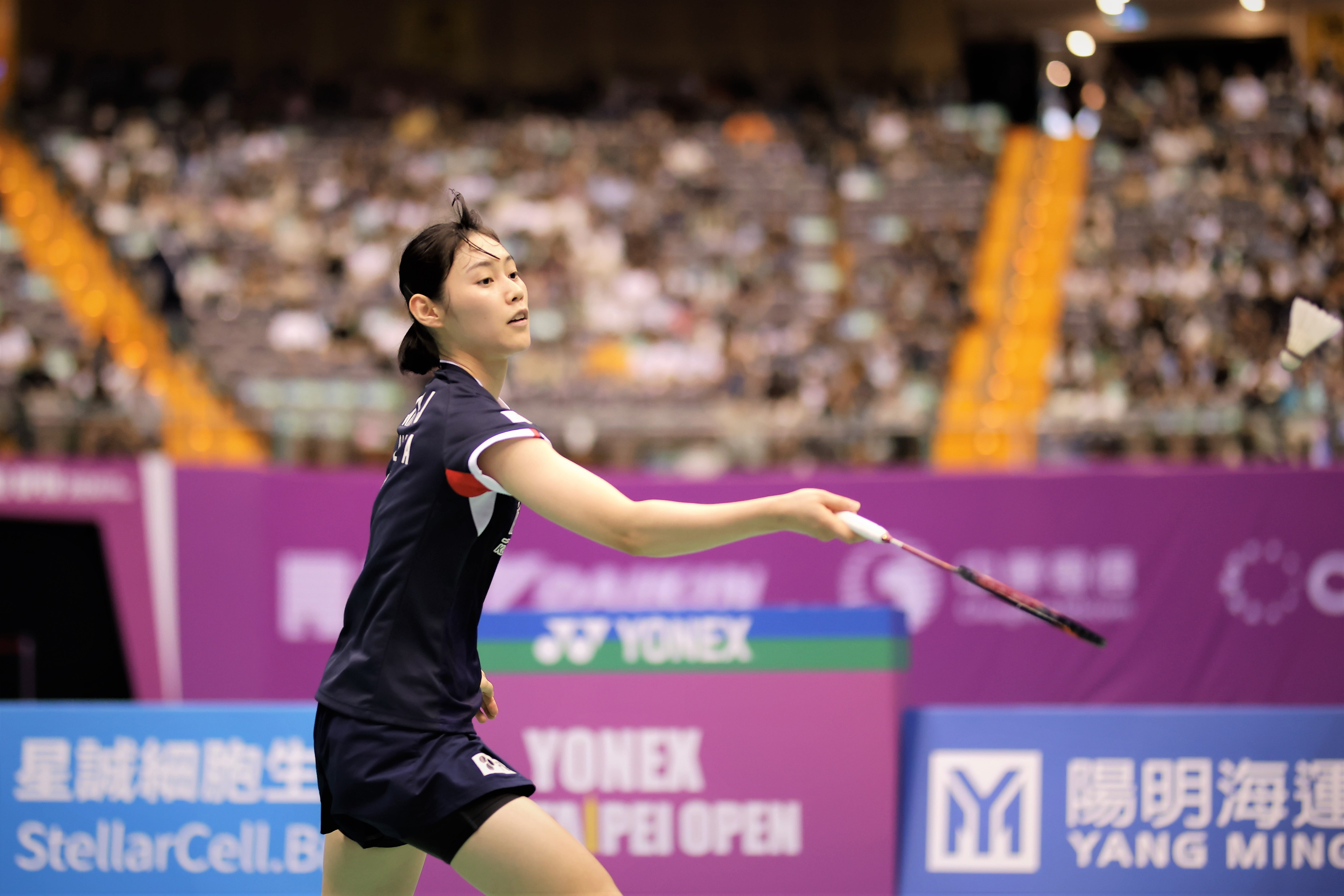
- Sim at the 2024 Taipei Open

Personal information
- Born: Shim Ye-rim 심예림; 13 May 1999 (age 27) Chungju, North Chungcheong, South Korea

Sport
- Country: South Korea
- Sport: Badminton
- Handedness: Right
- Coached by: Sung Ji-hyun

Women's singles
- Highest ranking: 10 (21 October 2025)
- Current ranking: 15 (10 November 2026)
- BWF profile
Medal record
Women's badminton
Representing South Korea
Sudirman Cup
Silver medal – second place	2025 Xiamen	Mixed team
Uber Cup
Gold medal – first place	2022 Bangkok	Women's team
Gold medal – first place	2026 Horsens	Women's team
Bronze medal – third place	2020 Aarhus	Women's team
Bronze medal – third place	2024 Chengdu	Women's team
Asian Games
Bronze medal – third place	2026 Aichi–Nagoya	Women's team
Asian Championships
Bronze medal – third place	2025 Ningbo	Women's singles
Bronze medal – third place	2026 Ningbo	Women's singles
Asia Mixed Team Championships
Silver medal – second place	2023 Dubai	Mixed team
Asia Team Championships
Silver medal – second place	2020 Manila	Women's team
Silver medal – second place	2022 Selangor	Women's team
Asian Junior Championships
Gold medal – first place	2017 Jakarta	Mixed team
Silver medal – second place	2015 Bangkok	Mixed team

- Sim Yu-jin
- Hangul: 심유진
- Hanja: 沈有振
- RR: Sim Yujin
- MR: Sim Yujin

Former name
- Hangul: 심예림
- Hanja: 沈譽林
- RR: Sim Yerim
- MR: Sim Yerim

Sim Yu-jin (Korean: 심유진; born Shim Ye-rim, 13 May 1999) is a South Korean badminton player. She won a bronze medal in the women's singles at the 2025 Asian Championships.

Sim is well known for her pivotal role in the 2022 Uber Cup, where she helped the Korean team to lift the Uber Cup trophy by beating China in the final in which she scored the decisive victory against Wang Zhiyi. In 2024, she claimed her first world tour title at the 2024 Taipei Open after defeating Indonesia's Putri Kusuma Wardani in the final. She also part of the Korea winning team in the 2026 Uber Cup.

== Early life ==
Sim was born as Shim Ye-rim on 13 May 1999 in Chungju, North Chungcheong, South Korea. She began playing badminton under the influence of her mother, who is also a badminton player.

== Achievements ==
=== Asian Championships ===
Women's singles

Year	Venue	Opponent	Score	Result	Ref
2025	Ningbo Olympic Sports Center Gymnasium, Ningbo, China	(China) Chen Yufei	11–21, 11–21	Bronze	
2026	Ningbo Olympic Sports Center Gymnasium, Ningbo, China	(South Korea) An Se-young	14–21, 9–21	Bronze	

=== BWF World Tour (1 title, 1 runner-up) ===
The BWF World Tour, which was announced on 19 March 2017 and implemented in 2018, is a series of elite badminton tournaments sanctioned by the Badminton World Federation (BWF). The BWF World Tour is divided into levels of World Tour Finals, Super 1000, Super 750, Super 500, Super 300 (part of the HSBC World Tour), and the BWF Tour Super 100.

Women's singles

Year	Tournament	Level	Opponent	Score	Result	Ref
2024	Taipei Open	Super 300	(Indonesia) Putri Kusuma Wardani	21–17, 21–13	(gold) Winner	
2025	Indonesia Masters	Super 500	(Thailand) Ratchanok Intanon	18–21, 17–21	(silver) Runner-up	

=== BWF International Challenge/Series (3 titles, 1 runner-up) ===
Women's singles

Year	Tournament	Opponent	Score	Result
2018	Norwegian International	(South Korea) Kim Ga-eun	21–8, 18–21, 21–16	(gold) Winner
2019	Mongolia International	(Thailand) Supanida Katethong	19–21, 21–19, 9–21	(silver) Runner-up
2023 (II)	Indonesia International	(South Korea) Kim Ga-ram	21–16, 21–13	(gold) Winner
2024	Vietnam International	(South Korea) Kim Ga-ram	21–9, 15–21, 21–8	(gold) Winner

BWF International Challenge tournament
BWF International Series tournament
BWF Future Series tournament

=== BWF Junior International (2 titles, 2 runners-up) ===
Girls' singles

Year	Tournament	Opponent	Score	Result
2015	Malaysia Junior International	(Malaysia) Thinaah Muralitharan	21–15, 22–20	(gold) Winner

Girls' doubles

Year	Tournament	Partner	Opponent	Score	Result
2015	German Junior International	(South Korea) Kim Hyang-im	(South Korea) Kim Hye-jeong (South Korea) Park Keun-hye	17–21, 17–21	(silver) Runner-up
2017	Dutch Junior International	(South Korea) Park Ga-eun	(South Korea) Kim Min-ji (South Korea) Seong Ah-yeong	16–21, 18–21	(silver) Runner-up

Mixed doubles

Year	Tournament	Partner	Opponent	Score	Result
2016	Korean Junior International	(South Korea) Kang Min-hyuk	(South Korea) Woo Seung-hoon (South Korea) Kim Min-ji	12–10, 11–7, 10–12, 11–6	(gold) Winner

BWF Junior International Grand Prix tournament
BWF Junior International Challenge tournament
BWF Junior International Series tournament
BWF Junior Future Series tournament
