= Jesita Putri Miantoro =

Indonesian badminton player (born 2002)

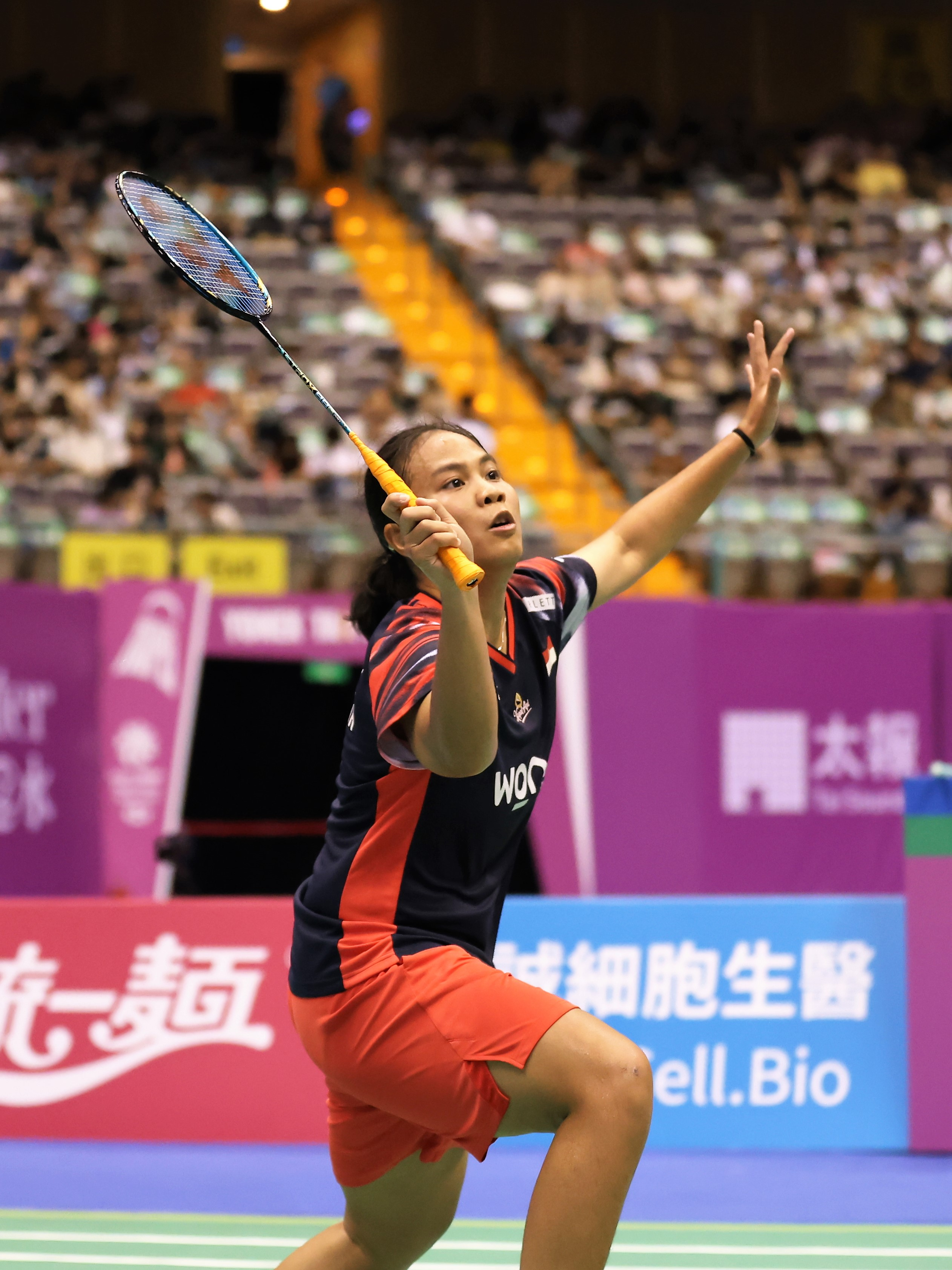
- Miantoro at the 2024 Taipei Open

Personal information
- Born: 1 May 2002 (age 24) Depok, West Java, Indonesia

Sport
- Country: Indonesia
- Sport: Badminton
- Handedness: Right

Women's doubles
- Highest ranking: 30 (with Febi Setianingrum, 8 October 2024)
- BWF profile
Medal record
Women's badminton
Representing Indonesia
Asia Team Championships
Gold medal – first place	2022 Selangor	Women's team

Jesita Putri Miantoro (born 1 May 2002) is an Indonesian badminton player affiliated with Exist Badminton Club. She was invited to be part of Indonesia's national badminton team in 2020. She was part of the Indonesian women's winning team at the 2022 Asia Team Championships.

== Career ==
In February 2020, Miantoro advanced to the finals of the Italian Junior International in girls' doubles events, but the tournament was canceled due to the outbreak of COVID-19 in Italy. She then took part at the Dutch Junior International, and won the girls' doubles event with Lanny Tria Mayasari.

=== 2021 ===
In October, Miantoro and her partner Febby Valencia Dwijayanti Gani won the Czech Open.

=== 2022 ===
She was selected to join the national team participated in the 2022 Asia Team Championships and Uber Cup, and the team won the Asia title after beating South Korea in the final. In the Uber Cup, the team was stopped in the quarter-finals to China. Miantoro and Mayasari then reached the finals in the senior tournament, Bonn International, and had to finished the tournament as runner-up. In July, they lost in the first round of the Singapore Open from 5th seed Chinese pair Zhang Shuxian and Zheng Yu.

In October, Miantoro was paired with Febi Setianingrum and lost in the semi-finals of Indonesia Masters Super 100 from 5th seed Japanese pair Rena Miyaura and Ayako Sakuramoto.

=== 2023 ===
Miantoro and her partner Febi Setianingrum opened the 2023 season at Iran Fajr International. They won the title defeating Malaysian pair Go Pei Kee and Teoh Mei Xing. In March, they lost in the final of Vietnam International from Korean pair Lee Yu-lim and Shin Seung-chan.

In September, they won the Indonesia International tournament in Medan, defeating her juniors pair Velisha Christina and Bernadine Anindya Wardana in straight games. In the next tournament, they competed at the Indonesia Masters Super 100 I but lost at the quarter-finals from 2nd seed and eventual finalist Chinese Taipei player Chang Ching-hui and Yang Ching-tun in straight games.

== Achievements ==
=== BWF World Tour (2 titles, 1 runner-up) ===
The BWF World Tour, which was announced on 19 March 2017 and implemented in 2018, is a series of elite badminton tournaments sanctioned by the Badminton World Federation (BWF). The BWF World Tours are divided into levels of World Tour Finals, Super 1000, Super 750, Super 500, Super 300, and the BWF Tour Super 100.

Women's doubles
Year	Tournament	Level	Partner	Opponent	Score	Result	Ref.
2024	Kaohsiung Masters	Super 100	(Indonesia) Febi Setianingrum	(Chinese Taipei) Sung Shuo-yun (Chinese Taipei) Yu Chien-hui	21–14, 21–18	(gold) Winner	
2024 (I)	Indonesia Masters	Super 100	(Indonesia) Febi Setianingrum	(Japan) Mizuki Otake (Japan) Miyu Takahashi	21–15, 21–13	(gold) Winner	
2024	Taipei Open	Super 300	(Indonesia) Febi Setianingrum	(Indonesia) Febriana Dwipuji Kusuma (Indonesia) Amallia Cahaya Pratiwi	15–21, 16–21	(silver) Runner-up	

=== BWF International Challenge/Series (2 titles, 3 runners-up) ===
Women's' doubles
Year	Tournament	Partner	Opponent	Score	Result	Ref.
2021	Czech Open	(Indonesia) Febby Valencia Dwijayanti Gani	(Malaysia) Anna Cheong (Malaysia) Teoh Mei Xing	15–21, 21–16, 17–21	(silver) Runner-up	
2022	Bonn International	(Indonesia) Lanny Tria Mayasari	(Chinese Taipei) Hsu Ya-ching (Chinese Taipei) Lin Wan-ching	19–21, 21–12, 16–21	(silver) Runner-up	
2023	Iran Fajr International	(Indonesia) Febi Setianingrum	(Malaysia) Go Pei Kee (Malaysia) Teoh Mei Xing	20–22, 21–16, 21–17	(gold) Winner	
2023	Vietnam International	(Indonesia) Febi Setianingrum	(South Korea) Lee Yu-lim (South Korea) Shin Seung-chan	18–21, 10–21	(silver) Runner-up	
2023 (I)	Indonesia International	(Indonesia) Febi Setianingrum	(Indonesia) Velisha Christina (Indonesia) Bernadine Anindya Wardana	21–17, 21–11	(gold) Winner	

BWF International Challenge tournament
BWF International Series tournament
BWF Future Series tournament

=== BWF Junior International (1 title) ===
Girls' doubles
Year	Tournament	Partner	Opponent	Score	Result	Ref.
2020	Dutch Junior International	(Indonesia) Lanny Tria Mayasari	(South Korea) Kim Min-sol (South Korea) Yoo A-yeon	21–10, 21–10	(gold) Winner	

BWF Junior International Grand Prix tournament
BWF Junior International Challenge tournament
BWF Junior International Series tournament
BWF Junior Future Series tournament

== Performance timeline ==
Key

W	Won	F	Finalist	SF	Semi-finalist
QF	Quarter-finalist	#R	Rounds 4, 3, 2, 1	RR	Round-robin stage
Q#	Qualification round	A	Absent	w/d	Withdrew
G	Gold	S	Silver	B	Bronze
NH	Not held	N/A	Not applicable	DNQ	Did not qualify

=== National team ===
- Senior level

Team events	2022	Ref
Asia Team Championships	G	
Uber Cup	QF	

=== Individual competitions ===
==== Senior level ====
===== Women's doubles =====
Tournament	BWF World Tour				Best	Ref
Tournament	2022	2023	2024	2025	Best	Ref
Indonesia Masters	A		2R	A	2R ('24)	
Thailand Masters	A		QF	A	QF ('24)	
Swiss Open	A		2R	A	2R ('24)	
Spain Masters	NH	A	1R	NH	1R ('24)	
Taipei Open	A		F	A	F ('24)	
Singapore Open	1R	A			1R ('22)	
Indonesia Open	A		1R	A	1R ('24)	
Macau Open	NH		2R	A	2R ('24)	
Indonesia Masters Super 100	SF	QF	W	Ret.	W ('24 I)	
Indonesia Masters Super 100	SF	SF	A	Ret.	W ('24 I)	
Kaohsiung Masters	NH	A	W	Ret.	W ('24)	
Korea Masters	A		1R	Ret.	1R ('24)	
Japan Masters	NH	A	1R	Ret.	1R ('24)	
Guwahati Masters	NH	QF	A	Ret.	QF ('23)	
Odisha Masters	A	SF	A	Ret.	SF ('23)	
Year-end ranking	100	43	33	–	30	
