= Rachel Allessya Rose =

Indonesian badminton player (born 2004)

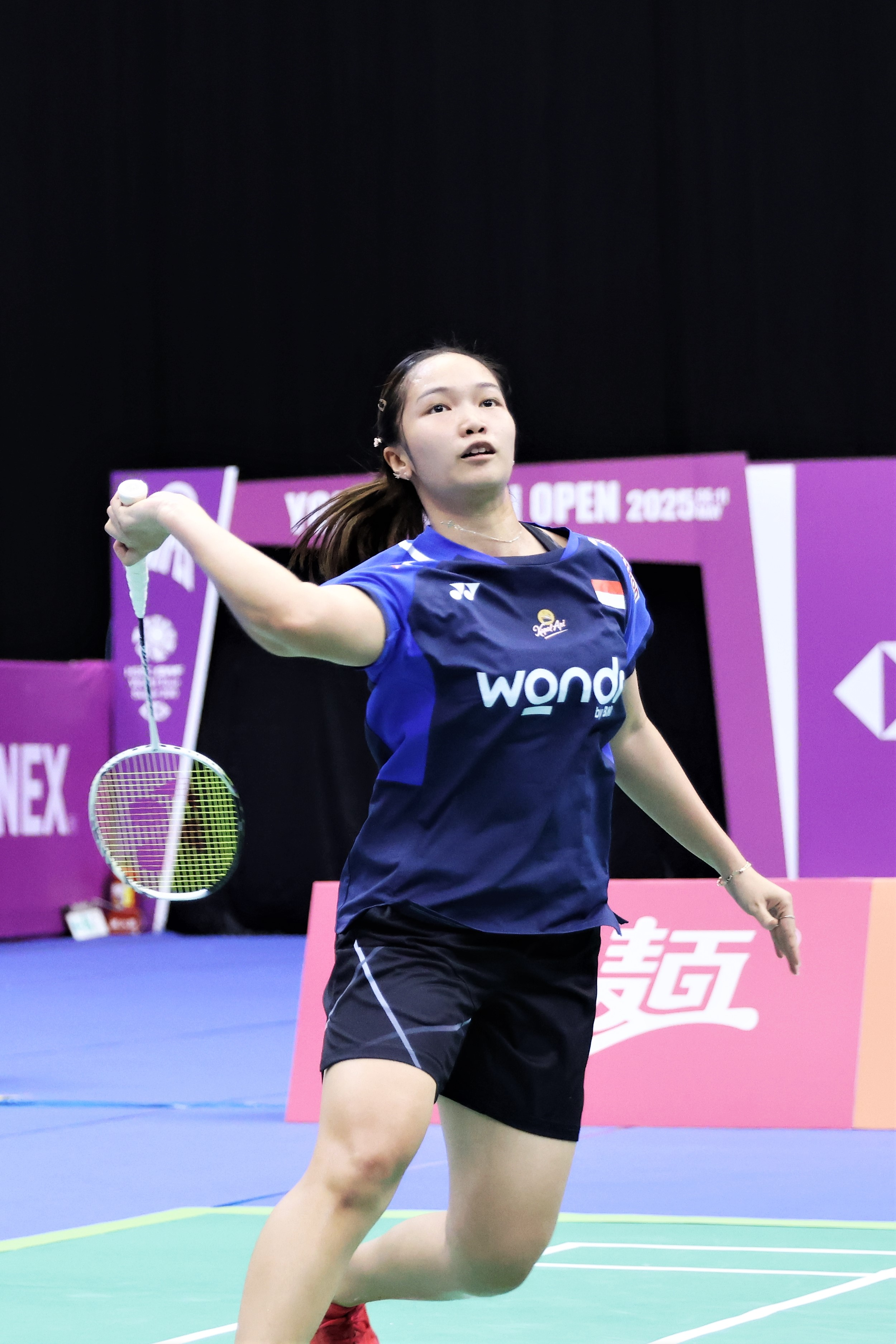
- Rose at the 2025 Taipei Open

Personal information
- Born: 30 June 2004 (age 22) Bogor, West Java, Indonesia

Sport
- Country: Indonesia
- Sport: Badminton
- Handedness: Right

Women's doubles
- Highest ranking: 6 (with Febi Setianingrum, 27 October 2026); 24 (with Meilysa Trias Puspita Sari, 10 June 2024)
- Current ranking: 7 (with Febi Setianingrum, 17 November 2026)
- BWF profile
Medal record
Women's badminton
Representing Indonesia
Uber Cup
Silver medal – second place	2024 Chengdu	Women's team
Bronze medal – third place	2026 Horsens	Women's team
Asian Games
Bronze medal – third place	2026 Aichi–Nagoya	Women's team
Asia Mixed Team Championships
Gold medal – first place	2025 Qingdao	Mixed team
Asia Team Championships
Bronze medal – third place	2024 Selangor	Women's team
Bronze medal – third place	2026 Qingdao	Women's team
SEA Games
Silver medal – second place	2023 Cambodia	Women's doubles
Silver medal – second place	2023 Cambodia	Women's team
Silver medal – second place	2025 Thailand	Women's team
Bronze medal – third place	2025 Thailand	Women's doubles
World Junior Championships
Silver medal – second place	2022 Santander	Girls' doubles
Bronze medal – third place	2022 Santander	Mixed team

Rachel Allessya Rose (born 30 June 2004) is an Indonesian badminton player. She was part of Indonesia squad that won a bronze medal in the 2022 World Junior Championships and a silver medal in the girls' doubles event.

== Career ==
=== 2022 ===
Rose and her partner Meilysa Trias Puspita Sari made their Asian Championships debut in April, where they lost to Yuki Fukushima and Sayaka Hirota in the first round. In May, Rose and Puspita Sari won their first senior title at the Slovenian International. They also made a surprise win at the Indonesia Masters against experienced Indian pair Ashwini Ponnappa and N. Sikki Reddy in the first round, before bowing out to world no. 1 Chen Qingchen and Jia Yifan in the second round.

Rose and Puspita Sari participated at the World Junior Championships as the second seeds in the individual event, but lost to Liu Shengshu and Wang Tingge in the final.

=== 2023 ===
In the first semester of 2023, Rose and Puspita Sari joined several BWF World Tour tournaments. Their journey was a rather uphill one, with first-round exits at the Indonesia Masters, Thailand Masters, Orléans Masters, Malaysia Masters, Thailand Open, Singapore Open, Indonesia Open and the Taipei Open, as well at the Asian Championships. They also lost in the qualifying round of the Swiss Open. Their best results were reaching the quarter-finals at the Spain Masters.

At the end of the year, Rose made her debut at the SEA Games. Together with the women's team, she earned a silver medal after losing against Thailand, and later on became runner-ups in the individual women's doubles event against seniors Febriana Dwipuji Kusuma and Amallia Cahaya Pratiwi.

In the second semester of 2023, they reached the quarterfinals of the Indonesia Masters I in Medan and Guwahati Masters and made it to the finals of the Indonesia Masters II in Surabaya. The pair closed the 2023 season with their first World Tour title at the Odisha Masters.

=== 2024 ===
Rose reached a women's team bronze at the Asia Team Championships in February. In March, she and Puspita Sari won their first ever World Tour title together at the Orléans Masters, after defeating fourth seed Rui Hirokami and Yuna Kato. She was also called up for the Uber Cup in May, in which the Indonesian team reached their first Uber Cup final since 2008. Rose and Puspita Sari did not play in the finals as Indonesia lost to first seed China 0–3.

Due to Puspita Sari's hiatus following a knee injury while preparing for the Thailand Open, Rose was temporarily partnered with Lanny Tria Mayasari for the Kaohsiung Masters, where they reached the quarter-finals. The pair also played at two home tournaments, the Indonesia International Challenge and the Indonesia Masters Super 100 I, both in Pekanbaru. Their journey ended at the second round of the Taipei Open after losing against Japanese Pair Mizuki Otake and Miyu Takahashi. Rose spent the rest of the 2024 season in another temporary partnership with Kelly Larissa, in which she finished at the second round of the Indonesia International Challenge and the quarter-finals of Indonesia Masters Super 100 II, both in Surabaya.

=== 2025 ===
Rose resumed her partnership with Puspita Sari following her partner's return to the court. They started out at the Indonesia Masters, where they fell against eventual champions Kim Hye-jeong and Kong Hee-yong in the first round. Resuming the partnership proved challenging, with their best results being semi-final finishes at the Thailand Masters and the Macau Open between a string of first- and second-round exits, as well as one quarter-final finish at the Thailand Open.

In August, the Indonesian Badminton Association reshuffled all of the women's doubles pairs in the senior team, in which Rose was paired with Febi Setianingrum. Their first tournament together was the Hong Kong Open, where they lost in three games against seniors Apriyani Rahayu and Siti Fadia Silva Ramadhanti in the first round. Rose and Setianingrum had to fall through the European tournaments against more seasoned pairs, namely Rin Iwanaga and Kie Nakanishi at the Arctic Open; Pearly Tan and Thinaah Muralitharan at the Denmark Open; and Baek Ha-na and Lee So-hee at the French Open.

Entering their Super 500 debut at the Australian Open, Rose and Setianingrum created the first ever all-Indonesian women's doubles final at a Super 500 and above tournament, together with compatriots Febriana Dwipuji Kusuma and Meilysa Trias Puspita Sari. In a tense final match lasting 109 minutes, Rose and Setianingrum emerged as champions, thus sealing their first ever Super 500 title. In December, Rose made her second appearance at the SEA Games. Playing as first doubles with Setianingrum in the team event, they helped the team reach the finals, but again conceded to Thailand. Rose and Setianingrum also obtained a bronze medal in the individual event after a close match against first seeds Tan and Muralitharan in the semi-finals.

=== 2026 ===
Rose's first tournament of the year was at the Indonesia Masters, where she improved her previous results by reaching the semi-finals with Setianingrum. They were eliminated by Arisa Igarashi and Miyu Takahashi. They later made it to the quarter-finals of the Thailand Masters. At the Asia Team Championships, Rose and Setianingrum won both their group stage matches against Hong Kong and Japan, the latter being an three-game upset against veterans Arisa Igarashi and Chiharu Shida. However, they were unable to replicate their success in the knockout stage, as they lost to Korean scratch pair Baek Ha-na and Kim Hye-jeong in the semi-finals. Rose made her debut at the Asian Games in 2026 Aichi–Nagoya, winning a bronze medal in the women's team event. In the individual women's doubles, she and her partner Setianingrum were knocked out in the early rounds by the Malaysian pair Pearly Tan and Thinaah Muralitharan.

== Achievements ==
=== SEA Games ===
Women's doubles
Year	Venue	Partner	Opponent	Score	Result	Ref.
2023	Morodok Techo Badminton Hall; Phnom Penh, Cambodia	(Indonesia) Meilysa Trias Puspita Sari	(Indonesia) Febriana Dwipuji Kusuma (Indonesia) Amalia Cahaya Pratiwi	17–21, 16–21	Silver	
2025	Gymnasium 4, Thammasat University Rangsit Campus; Pathum Thani, Thailand	(Indonesia) Febi Setianingrum	(Malaysia) Pearly Tan (Malaysia) Thinaah Muralitharan	14–21, 21–19, 16–21	Bronze	

=== World Junior Championships ===
Girls' doubles
Year	Venue	Partner	Opponent	Score	Result	Ref.
2022	Palacio de Deportes de Santander; Santander, Spain	(Indonesia) Meilysa Trias Puspita Sari	(China) Liu Shengshu (China) Wang Tingge	14–21, 16–21	Silver	

=== BWF World Tour (3 titles, 1 runner-up) ===
The BWF World Tour, which was announced on 19 March 2017 and implemented in 2018, is a series of elite badminton tournaments sanctioned by the Badminton World Federation (BWF). The BWF World Tours are divided into levels of World Tour Finals, Super 1000, Super 750, Super 500, Super 300, and the BWF Tour Super 100.

Women's doubles
Year	Tournament	Level	Partner	Opponent	Score	Result	Ref.
2023 (II)	Indonesia Masters	Super 100	(Indonesia) Meilysa Trias Puspita Sari	(Indonesia) Lanny Tria Mayasari (Indonesia) Ribka Sugiarto	12–21, 16–21	(silver) Runner-up	
2023	Odisha Masters	Super 100	(Indonesia) Meilysa Trias Puspita Sari	(India) Tanisha Crasto (India) Ashwini Ponnappa	21–14, 21–17	(gold) Winner	
2024	Orléans Masters	Super 300	(Indonesia) Meilysa Trias Puspita Sari	(Japan) Rui Hirokami (Japan) Yuna Kato	21–12, 21–18	(gold) Winner	
2025	Australian Open	Super 500	(Indonesia) Febi Setianingrum	(Indonesia) Febriana Dwipuji Kusuma (Indonesia) Meilysa Trias Puspita Sari	18–21, 21–19, 23–21	(gold) Winner	

=== BWF International Challenge/Series (1 title) ===
Women's doubles
Year	Tournament	Partner	Opponent	Score	Result	Ref.
2022	Slovenian International	(Indonesia) Meilysa Trias Puspita Sari	(Italy) Martina Corsini (Italy) Judith Mair	21–18, 21–14	(gold) Winner	

BWF International Challenge tournament
BWF International Series tournament
BWF Future Series tournament

=== BWF Junior International (3 titles) ===
Girls' doubles
Year	Tournament	Partner	Opponent	Score	Result
2021	Denmark Junior	(Indonesia) Meilysa Trias Puspita Sari	(Indonesia) Savira Nurul Husnia (Indonesia) Kelly Larissa	21–7, 21–10	(gold) Winner
2021	Finnish Junior	(Indonesia) Meilysa Trias Puspita Sari	(Estonia) Catlyn Kruus (Estonia) Ramona Üprus	21–11, 21–15	(gold) Winner
2022	Alpes International U19	(Indonesia) Meilysa Trias Puspita Sari	(Indonesia) Anisanaya Kamila (Indonesia) Az Zahra Ditya Ramadhani	21–17, 21–12	(gold) Winner

BWF Junior International Grand Prix tournament
BWF Junior International Challenge tournament
BWF Junior International Series tournament
BWF Junior Future Series tournament

== Performance timeline ==
Key

W	Won	F	Finalist	SF	Semi-finalist
QF	Quarter-finalist	#R	Rounds 4, 3, 2, 1	RR	Round-robin stage
Q#	Qualification round	A	Absent	w/d	Withdrew
G	Gold	S	Silver	B	Bronze
NH	Not held	N/A	Not applicable	DNQ	Did not qualify

=== National team ===
- Junior level

Team events	2022	Ref
World Junior Championships	B	

- Senior level

Team events	2023	2024	2025	2026	Ref
SEA Games	S	NH	S	NH	
Asia Team Championships	NH	B	NH	B	
Asia Mixed Team Championships	A	NH	G	NH	
Asian Games	NH			B	
Uber Cup	NH	S	NH	B	

=== Individual competitions ===
==== Junior level ====
- Girls' doubles

Events	2022	Ref
World Junior Championships	S	

==== Senior level ====
- Women's doubles

Event	2022	2023	2024	2025	2026	Ref
SEA Games	NH	S	NH	B	NH	
Asian Championships	1R	2R	1R	1R	QF	
Asian Games	A	NH			1R	
World Championships	DNQ	DNQ	NH	DNQ	QF	

Tournament	BWF World Tour					Best	Ref
Tournament	2022	2023	2024	2025	2026	Best	Ref
Indonesia Masters	2R	1R	2R	1R	SF	SF ('26)	
Thailand Masters	NH	2R	1R	SF	QF	SF ('25)	
German Open	A			2R	A	2R ('25)	
All England Open	A				1R	1R ('26)	
Swiss Open	A	Q1	1R	A	1R	1R ('24, '26)	
Orléans Masters	A	2R	W	2R	SF	W ('24)	
Thailand Open	A	1R	w/d	QF	A	QF ('25)	
Malaysia Masters	A	1R	A	1R	A	1R ('23, '25)	
Singapore Open	1R	1R	A			1R ('22, '23)	
Indonesia Open	A	2R	A	1R	SF	SF ('26)	
Australian Open	2R	A		W	SF	W ('25)	
Macau Open	NH		A	SF	A	SF ('25)	
Japan Open	A				1R	1R ('26)	
China Open	NH	A			QF	QF ('26)	
Taipei Open	A	2R	2R	SF	A	SF ('25)	
China Masters	NH	A		2R	A	2R ('25)	
Indonesia Masters Super 100	A	QF	QF	A		F ('23 II)	
Indonesia Masters Super 100	A	F	QF	A		F ('23 II)	
Arctic Open	NH	A		2R	A	2R ('25)	
Denmark Open	A			1R	2R	2R ('26)	
French Open	A		1R	2R	SF	SF ('26)	
Hylo Open	A				1R	1R ('26)	
Japan Masters	NH	A			w/d	—	
Kaohsiung Masters	NH	A	QF	A		QF ('24)	
Hong Kong Open	NH	A		1R	A	1R ('25)	
Guwahati Masters	NH	QF	A			QF ('23)	
Odisha Masters	A	W	A			W ('23)	
Spain Masters	NH	QF	A	NH		QF ('23)	
Year-end ranking	58	34	64	30		6	
Tournament	2022	2023	2024	2025	Best	Ref	
