= 2019 BWF World Junior Championships – Teams event group stage =

The group stage of the 2019 BWF World Junior Championships – Teams event was the first stage of the competition. It was held at Kazan Gymnastics Center in Kazan, Russia, from 30 September to 5 October.

== Group composition ==
The draw for 41 teams competing in the tournament were announced on 4 September 2019.

Group A		Group B	Group C		Group D	
A1	A2	Group B	C1	C2	Group D	
1. Indonesia; 2. Finland; 3. Uganda	1. Spain; 2. Hungary; 3. Kazakhstan	1. Russia; 2. Canada; 3. Macau; 4. Hong Kong; 5. Malaysia	1. Thailand; 2. Belarus; 3. Latvia	1. Switzerland; 2. Mongolia; 3. Estonia	1. England; 2. France; 3. Czech Republic; 4. Sweden; 5. Portugal	
Group E		Group F	Group G		Group H	
Group E		Group F	Group G		H1	H2
1. India; 2. Japan; 3. Australia; 4. Armenia; 5. United States		1. South Korea; 2. Singapore; 3. Sri Lanka; 4. Slovakia; 5. Peru	1. Denmark; 2. Chinese Taipei; 3. Uzbekistan; 4. Faroe Islands; 5. New Zealand		1. China; 2. Scotland; 3. Norway	1. Germany; 2. Iceland; 3. Lithuania

== Group A ==
=== Group A1 ===
Pos	Team	Pld	W	L	MF	MA	MD	GF	GA	GD	PF	PA	PD	Pts	Qualification
1	Indonesia [1]	2	2	0	10	0	+10	20	0	+20	420	154	+266	2	Advance to Play-off A1
2	Finland [17/43]	2	1	1	5	5	0	10	10	0	308	353	−45	1	Advance to Play-off A2
3	Uganda [17/43]	2	0	2	0	10	−10	0	20	−20	199	420	−221	0	Advance to Play-off A3

Updated to match(es) played on 1 October 2019. Source: TS

==== Indonesia vs Uganda ====
Indonesia
5
Kazan Gymnastics Center, Court 1
30 September 2019, 12:00 UTC+3

Uganda
0

			1	2	3
1	(Indonesia) (Uganda)	Stephanie Widjaja; Fadilah Mohamed Rafi	21; 2	21; 4
2	(Indonesia) (Uganda)	Syabda Perkasa Belawa; Brian Kasirye	21; 14	21; 11
3	(Indonesia) (Uganda)	Febriana Dwipuji Kusuma / Amalia Cahaya Pratiwi; Husina Kobugabe / Tracy Naluwooza	21; 3	21; 3
4	(Indonesia) (Uganda)	M. Lucky Andres Apriyanda / Daniel Marthin; Arshath Mohamed Nazurudheen Vaheed / Samuel Wasswa	21; 1	21; 1
5	(Indonesia) (Uganda)	Dwiki Rafian Restu / Metya Inayah Cindiani; Brian Kasirye / Husina Kobugabe	21; 9	21; 8

==== Finland vs Uganda ====
Finland
5
Kazan Gymnastics Center, Court 5
30 September 2019, 19:30 UTC+3

Uganda
0

			1	2	3
1	(Finland) (Uganda)	Tuuli Vasikkaniemi; Husina Kobugabe	21; 14	21; 15
2	(Finland) (Uganda)	Joakim Oldorff; Brian Kasirye	21; 17	21; 15
3	(Finland) (Uganda)	Johanna Kelavuori / Noora Nokkala; Fadilah Mohamed Rafi / Tracy Naluwooza	21; 14	21; 10
4	(Finland) (Uganda)	Safin Emran / Juuso Kuoppala; Arshath Mohamed Nazurudheen Vaheed / Samuel Wasswa	21; 10	21; 13
5	(Finland) (Uganda)	Tony Lindelöf / Julia Salonen; Brian Kasirye / Husina Kobugabe	21; 16	21; 19

==== Indonesia vs Finland ====
Indonesia
5
Kazan Gymnastics Center, Court 1
1 October 2019, 12:00 UTC+3

Finland
0

			1	2	3
1	(Indonesia) (Finland)	Christian Adinata; Joakim Oldorff	21; 14	21; 10
2	(Indonesia) (Finland)	Putri Kusuma Wardani; Julia Salonen	21; 7	21; 6
3	(Indonesia) (Finland)	Leo Rolly Carnando / Daniel Marthin; Tony Lindelöf / Joakim Oldorff	21; 11	21; 16
4	(Indonesia) (Finland)	Nita Violina Marwah / Putri Syaikah; Johanna Kelavuori / Noora Nokkala	21; 7	21; 10
5	(Indonesia) (Finland)	Dwiki Rafian Restu / Indah Cahya Sari Jamil; Tony Lindelöf / Julia Salonen	21; 8	21; 9

=== Group A2 ===
Pos	Team	Pld	W	L	MF	MA	MD	GF	GA	GD	PF	PA	PD	Pts	Qualification
1	Spain [9/16]	2	2	0	8	2	+6	17	4	+13	414	268	+146	2	Advance to Play-off A1
2	Hungary [17/43]	2	1	1	7	3	+4	14	7	+7	395	333	+62	1	Advance to Play-off A2
3	Kazakhstan [17/43]	2	0	2	0	10	−10	0	20	−20	212	420	−208	0	Advance to Play-off A3

First match(es) will be played: 30 September 2019. Source: TS

==== Spain vs Kazakhstan ====
Spain
5
Kazan Gymnastics Center, Court 4
30 September 2019, 12:00 UTC+3

Kazakhstan
0

			1	2	3
1	(Spain) (Kazakhstan)	Alvaro Leal / Laura Solis; Viktor Zeiferling / Vassilissa Li Zhe Yu	21; 2	21; 4
2	(Spain) (Kazakhstan)	Lucia Rodriguez; Daria Moiseenko	21; 6	21; 13
3	(Spain) (Kazakhstan)	Marc Cardona; Damir Abdullayev	21; 8	21; 6
4	(Spain) (Kazakhstan)	Fatima Albin / Elena Lorenzo; Darya Chotonova / Nargiza Rakhmetullayeva	21; 7	21; 10
5	(Spain) (Kazakhstan)	Joan Monroy / Carlos Piris; Bogdan Nazarov / Andrey Shalagin	21; 8	21; 19

==== Hungary vs Kazakhstan ====
Hungary
5
Kazan Gymnastics Center, Court 6
30 September 2019, 19:30 UTC+3

Kazakhstan
0

			1	2	3
1	(Hungary) (Kazakhstan)	Gergely Szita / Vivien Sandorhazi; Bogdan Nazarov / Nargiza Rakhmetullayeva	21; 12	21; 12
2	(Hungary) (Kazakhstan)	Petra Meszaros; Darya Chotonova	21; 12	21; 16
3	(Hungary) (Kazakhstan)	Sebestyen Nagy; Andrey Shalagin	21; 12	21; 15
4	(Hungary) (Kazakhstan)	Fanni Dora Kiss / Vivien Sandorhazi; Vassilissa Li Zhe Yu / Daria Moiseenko	21; 10	21; 14
5	(Hungary) (Kazakhstan)	Bene Benjamin Kiss / Gergely Szita; Vladislav Chernikov / Artem Korolev	21; 14	21; 12

==== Spain vs Hungary ====
Spain
3
Kazan Gymnastics Center, Court 2
1 October 2019, 12:00 UTC+3

Hungary
2

			1	2	3
1	(Spain) (Hungary)	Alvaro Leal / Laura Solis; Gergely Szita / Fanni Dora Kiss	21; 11	21; 17
2	(Spain) (Hungary)	Ania Setien; Vivien Sandorhazi	15; 21	17; 21
3	(Spain) (Hungary)	Marc Cardona; Kristof Toth	21; 11	21; 18
4	(Spain) (Hungary)	Fatima Albin / Elena Lorenzo; Fanni Dora Kiss / Vivien Sandorhazi	21; 16	15; 21	10; 21
5	(Spain) (Hungary)	Joan Monroy / Carlos Piris; Bene Benjamin Kiss / Gergely Szita	21; 14	21; 14

=== Group A play-offs ===
Play-off A1
Indonesia [1]	3
Spain [9/16]	0

Play-off A2
Finland [17/43]	1
Hungary [17/43]	3

Play-off A3
Uganda [17/43]	1
Kazakhstan [17/43]	3

==== Play-off A1: Indonesia vs Spain ====
Indonesia
3
Kazan Gymnastics Center, Court 1
2 October 2019, 12:00 UTC+3

Spain
0

			1	2	3
1	(Indonesia) (Spain)	Dwiki Rafian Restu / Indah Cahya Sari Jamil; Alvaro Leal / Laura Solis	21; 14	21; 11
2	(Indonesia) (Spain)	Putri Kusuma Wardani; Lucia Rodriguez	21; 12	21; 7
3	(Indonesia) (Spain)	Bobby Setiabudi; Tomas Toledano	21; 13	29; 27
4	(Indonesia) (Spain)	Nita Violina Marwah / Putri Syaikah; Elena Lorenzo / Ruth Veiguela				not played
5	(Indonesia) (Spain)	Leo Rolly Carnando / Daniel Marthin; Joan Monroy / Carlos Piris				not played

==== Play-off A2: Finland vs Hungary ====
Finland
1
Kazan Gymnastics Center, Court 8
1 October 2019, 19:00 UTC+3

Hungary
3

			1	2	3
1	(Finland) (Hungary)	Tony Lindelöf / Julia Salonen; Gergely Szita / Fanni Dora Kiss	19; 21	21; 19	17; 21
2	(Finland) (Hungary)	Johanna Kelavuori; Vivien Sandorhazi	11; 21	9; 21
3	(Finland) (Hungary)	Joakim Oldorff; Sebestyen Nagy	21; 13	21; 10
4	(Finland) (Hungary)	Julia Salonen / Tuuli Vasikkaniemi; Fanni Dora Kiss / Vivien Sandorhazi	16; 21	12; 21
5	(Finland) (Hungary)	Tony Lindelöf / Joakim Oldorff; Bene Benjamin Kiss / Gergely Szita				not played

==== Play-off A3: Uganda vs Kazakhstan ====
Uganda
1
Kazan Gymnastics Center, Court 7
1 October 2019, 19:00 UTC+3

Kazakhstan
3

			1	2	3
1	(Uganda) (Kazakhstan)	Husina Kobugabe; Daria Moiseenko	17; 21	12; 21
2	(Uganda) (Kazakhstan)	Brian Kasirye; Damir Abdullayev	21; 11	21; 12
3	(Uganda) (Kazakhstan)	Fadilah Mohamed Rafi / Tracy Naluwooza; Daria Moiseenko / Nargiza Rakhmetullayeva	15; 21	22; 20	18; 21
4	(Uganda) (Kazakhstan)	Arshath Mohamed Nazurudheen Vaheed / Samuel Wasswa; Bogdan Nazarov / Andrey Shalagin	10; 21	21; 18	17; 21
5	(Uganda) (Kazakhstan)	Brian Kasirye / Husina Kobugabe; Andrey Shalagin / Nargiza Rakhmetullayeva				not played

== Group B ==
Pos	Team	Pld	W	L	MF	MA	MD	GF	GA	GD	PF	PA	PD	Pts	Qualification
1	Hong Kong [17/43]	4	4	0	15	5	+10	35	14	+21	961	794	+167	4	Qualified to knockout stage 1st to 8th
2	Malaysia [17/43]	4	3	1	14	6	+8	31	18	+13	948	733	+215	3	Qualified to knockout stage 9th to 16th place
3	Russia [5/8]	4	2	2	11	9	+2	26	21	+5	865	785	+80	2	Qualified to knockout stage 17th to 24th place
4	Canada [9/16]	4	1	3	9	11	−2	21	24	−3	740	818	−78	1	Qualified to knockout stage 25th to 32nd place
5	Macau [17/43]	4	0	4	1	19	−18	3	39	−36	483	867	−384	0	Qualified to knockout stage 33rd to 40th

First match(es) will be played: 30 September 2019. Source: TS

=== Russia vs Malaysia ===
Russia
2
Kazan Gymnastics Center, Court 5
30 September 2019, 8:30 UTC+3

Malaysia
3

			1	2	3
1	(Russia) (Malaysia)	Egor Kholkin / Georgii Lebedev; Ooi Jhy Dar / Yap Roy King	11; 21	23; 21	13; 21
2	(Russia) (Malaysia)	Anastasiia Shapovalova; Letshanaa Karupathevan	19; 21	21; 17	21; 17
3	(Russia) (Malaysia)	Georgii Karpov; Shahyar Shaqeem	21; 14	21; 13
4	(Russia) (Malaysia)	Viktoriia Kozyreva / Anastasiia Shapovalova; Low Yeen Yuan / Valeree Siow	24; 22	16; 21	11; 21
5	(Russia) (Malaysia)	Egor Kholkin / Mariia Sukhova; Yap Roy King / Gan Jing Err	15; 21	11; 21

=== Canada vs Hong Kong ===
Canada
1
Kazan Gymnastics Center, Court 6
30 September 2019, 8:30 UTC+3

Hong Kong
4

			1	2	3
1	(Canada) (Hong Kong)	Jonathan Chien / Crystal Lai; Ko Shing Hei / Yeung Pui Lam	10; 21	15; 21
2	(Canada) (Hong Kong)	Wenyu Zhang; Cheng Sin Yan	22; 24	12; 21
3	(Canada) (Hong Kong)	Alexander Bianchini; Jason Gunawan	14; 21	10; 21
4	(Canada) (Hong Kong)	Catherine Choi / Talia Ng; Tsang Hiu Yan / Yeung Pui Lam	21; 16	19; 21	21; 19
5	(Canada) (Hong Kong)	Yunzhi Chen / Colin Jia; Ko Shing Hei / Lui Chun Wai	24; 22	5; 21	14; 21

=== Macau vs Malaysia ===
Macau
0
Kazan Gymnastics Center, Court 1
30 September 2019, 15:30 UTC+3

Malaysia
5

			1	2	3
1	(Macau) (Malaysia)	Leong Iok Chong / Wong Cheng Wa; Junaidi Arif / Valeree Siow	12; 21	7; 21
2	(Macau) (Malaysia)	Pui Chi Wa; Myisha Mohd Khairul	10; 21	2; 21
3	(Macau) (Malaysia)	Pui Chi Chon; Wyman Goh	10; 21	16; 21
4	(Macau) (Malaysia)	Chio Weng U / Pui Chi Wa; Go Pei Kee / Teoh Le Xuan	6; 21	5; 21
5	(Macau) (Malaysia)	Lam Hou In / Ng Ka Seng; Ching Kai Feng / Lwi Sheng Hao	11; 21	5; 21

=== Russia vs Hong Kong ===
Russia
2
Kazan Gymnastics Center, Court 2
30 September 2019, 15:30 UTC+3

Hong Kong
3

			1	2	3
1	(Russia) (Hong Kong)	Egor Kholkin / Anastasiia Shapovalova; Ko Shing Hei / Yeung Pui Lam	15; 21	9; 21
2	(Russia) (Hong Kong)	Georgii Karpov; Jason Gunawan	21; 17	19; 21	21; 13
3	(Russia) (Hong Kong)	Anastasiia Shapovalova; Happy Serena Cheng Sin Yan	16; 21	21; 16	19; 21
4	(Russia) (Hong Kong)	Georgii Karpov / Georgii Lebedev; Ko Shing Hei / Lui Chun Wai	25; 23	15; 21	21; 12
5	(Russia) (Hong Kong)	Viktoriia Kozyreva / Mariia Sukhova; Leung Sze Lok / Yeung Pui Lam	17; 21	18; 21

=== Canada vs Malaysia ===
Canada
1
Kazan Gymnastics Center, Court 3
1 October 2019, 8:30 UTC+3

Malaysia
4

			1	2	3
1	(Canada) (Malaysia)	Jonathan Chien / Crystal Lai; Yap Roy King / Gan Jing Err	11; 21	21; 11	16; 21
2	(Canada) (Malaysia)	Talia Ng; Tan Zhing Yi	21; 10	21; 14
3	(Canada) (Malaysia)	Yunzhi Chen; Kok Jing Hong	7; 21	4^{r} 11
4	(Canada) (Malaysia)	Catherine Choi / Wenyu Zhang; Go Pei Kee / Teoh Le Xuan	12; 21	21; 18	13; 21
5	(Canada) (Malaysia)	Alexander Bianchini / Colin Jia; Ching Kai Feng / Lwi Sheng Hao	9; 21	13; 21

=== Russia vs Macau ===
Russia
4
Kazan Gymnastics Center, Court 4
1 October 2019, 8:30 UTC+3

Macau
1

			1	2	3
1	(Russia) (Macau)	Mariia Golubeva; Wong Cheng Wa	21; 16	21; 9
2	(Russia) (Macau)	Georgii Lebedev; Lee Rui Huan	21; 8	21; 17
3	(Russia) (Macau)	Anastasiia Kurdyukova / Anastasiia Shapovalova; Chio Weng U / Pui Chi Wa	21; 2	21; 4
4	(Russia) (Macau)	Georgii Karpov / Egor Kholkin; Ng Ka Seng / Vong Kok Weng	21; 18	21; 4
5	(Russia) (Macau)	Lev Barinov / Anastasiia Boiarun; Leong Iok Chong / Wong Cheng Wa	21; 11	13; 21	15; 21

=== Hong Kong vs Malaysia ===
Hong Kong
3
Kazan Gymnastics Center, Court 7
1 October 2019, 15:30 UTC+3

Malaysia
2

			1	2	3
1	(Hong Kong) (Malaysia)	Hung Kuei Chun / Lui Chun Wai; Ching Kai Feng / Lwi Sheng Hao	21; 18	13; 21	18; 21
2	(Hong Kong) (Malaysia)	Lui Lok Lok / Tsang Hiu Yan; Go Pei Kee / Teoh Le Xuan	21; 23	21; 19	21; 13
3	(Hong Kong) (Malaysia)	Jason Gunawan; Kok Jing Hong	11; 21	21; 19	5; 21
4	(Hong Kong) (Malaysia)	Happy Serena Cheng Sin Yan; Letshanaa Karupathevan	21; 17	17; 21	21; 19
5	(Hong Kong) (Malaysia)	Lui Chun Wai / Yeung Pui Lam; Yap Roy King / Gan Jing Err	21; 19	21; 14

=== Canada vs Macau ===
Canada
5
Kazan Gymnastics Center, Court 8
1 October 2019, 15:30 UTC+3

Macau
0

			1	2	3
1	(Canada) (Macau)	Colin Jia / Jacqueline Cheung; Leong Iok Chong / Wong Cheng Wa	21; 12	19; 21	22; 20
2	(Canada) (Macau)	Rachel Chan; Pui Chi Wa	21; 6	21; 12
3	(Canada) (Macau)	Alexander Bianchini; Ao Fei Long	21; 15	21; 15
4	(Canada) (Macau)	Crystal Lai / Wenyu Zhang; Pui Chi Wa / Wong Cheng Wa	21; 13	21; 14
5	(Canada) (Macau)	Jonathan Chien / Colin Jia; Leong Iok Chong / Vong Kok Weng	21; 18	21; 18

=== Russia vs Canada ===
Russia
3
Kazan Gymnastics Center, Court 1
2 October 2019, 8:30 UTC+3

Canada
2

			1	2	3
1	(Russia) (Canada)	Egor Kholkin / Mariia Sukhova; Jonathan Chien / Crystal Lai	8; 21	20; 22
2	(Russia) (Canada)	Anastasiia Shapovalova; Talia Ng	21; 18	21; 14
3	(Russia) (Canada)	Georgii Lebedev; Alexander Bianchini	21; 12	21; 8
4	(Russia) (Canada)	Anastasiia Kurdyukova / Anastasiia Shapovalova; Catherine Choi / Wenyu Zhang	15; 21	15; 21
5	(Russia) (Canada)	Georgii Karpov / Georgii Lebedev; Jonathan Chien / Colin Jia	21; 7	21; 10

=== Macau vs Hong Kong ===
Macau
0
Kazan Gymnastics Center, Court 5
2 October 2019, 8:30 UTC+3

Hong Kong
5

			1	2	3
1	(Macau) (Hong Kong)	Vong Kok Weng / Pui Chi Wa; Hung Kuei Chun / Tsang Hiu Yan	12; 21	14; 21
2	(Macau) (Hong Kong)	Wong Cheng Wa; Saloni Samirbhai Mehta	9; 21	10; 21
3	(Macau) (Hong Kong)	Lee Rui Huan; Jason Gunawan	8; 21	6; 21
4	(Macau) (Hong Kong)	Chio Weng U / Wong Cheng Wa; Leung Sze Lok / Lui Lok Lok	9; 21	7; 21
5	(Macau) (Hong Kong)	Lam Hou In / Ng Ka Seng; Jason Gunawan / Hung Kuei Chun	14; 21	15; 21

== Group C ==
=== Group C1 ===
Pos	Team	Pld	W	L	MF	MA	MD	GF	GA	GD	PF	PA	PD	Pts	Qualification
1	Thailand [3/4]	2	2	0	10	0	+10	20	0	+20	420	140	+280	2	Advance to Play-off C1
2	Belarus [17/43]	2	1	1	5	5	0	10	10	0	295	335	−40	1	Advance to Play-off C2
3	Latvia [17/43]	2	0	2	0	10	−10	0	20	−20	180	420	−240	0	Advance to Play-off C3

First match(es) will be played: 30 September 2019. Source: TS

==== Thailand vs Latvia ====
Thailand
5
Kazan Gymnastics Center, Court 5
30 September 2019, 12:00 UTC+3

Latvia
0

			1	2	3
1	(Thailand) (Latvia)	Ratchapol Makkasasithorn / Benyapa Aimsaard; Alens Zandovskis / Amanda Azarova	21; 6	21; 7
2	(Thailand) (Latvia)	Phittayaporn Chaiwan; Diāna Stognija	21; 6	21; 4
3	(Thailand) (Latvia)	Kunlavut Vitidsarn; Mārtiņš Ķirkums	21; 4	21; 7
4	(Thailand) (Latvia)	Pornpicha Choeikeewong / Pornnicha Suwatnodom; Anna Kupča / Annija Rulle-Titava	21; 2	21; 7
5	(Thailand) (Latvia)	Tanadon Punpanich / Sirawit Sothon; Kristaps Vārna / Alens Zandovskis	21; 3	21; 9

==== Belarus vs Latvia ====
Belarus
5
Kazan Gymnastics Center, Court 1
30 September 2019, 19:30 UTC+3

Latvia
0

			1	2	3
1	(Belarus) (Latvia)	Hleb Shvdkou / Aliaksandra Vasileuskaya; Alens Zandovskis / Anna Kupča	21; 16	21; 15
2	(Belarus) (Latvia)	Veranika Tarusava; Diāna Stognija	21; 11	21; 15
3	(Belarus) (Latvia)	Ilya Larushyn; Mārtiņš Ķirkums	21; 10	21; 8
4	(Belarus) (Latvia)	Hanna Bandarenka / Veranika Tarusava; Anna Kupča / Annija Rulle-Titava	21; 19	21; 9
5	(Belarus) (Latvia)	Aliaksandr Aliaksandrovich / Ilya Larushyn; Kristaps Varna / Alens Zandovskis	21; 8	21; 14

==== Thailand vs Belarus ====
Thailand
5
Kazan Gymnastics Center, Court 7
1 October 2019, 12:00 UTC+3

Belarus
0

			1	2	3
1	(Thailand) (Belarus)	Sirawit Sothon / Pornnicha Suwatnodom; Aliaksandr Aliaksandrovich / Aliaksandra Vasileuskaya	21; 8	21; 10
2	(Thailand) (Belarus)	Benyapa Aimsaard; Veranika Tarusava	21; 7	21; 7
3	(Thailand) (Belarus)	Varot Uraiwong; Hleb Shvdkou	21; 8	21; 6
4	(Thailand) (Belarus)	Pichamon Phatcharaphisutsin / Pitchayanin Ungka; Hanna Bandarenka / Veranika Tarusava	21; 10	21; 12
5	(Thailand) (Belarus)	Thanawin Madee / Ratchapol Makkasasithorn; Aliaksandr Aliaksandrovich / Ilya Larushyn	21; 5	21; 12

=== Group C2 ===
Pos	Team	Pld	W	L	MF	MA	MD	GF	GA	GD	PF	PA	PD	Pts	Qualification
1	Switzerland [9/16]	2	2	0	9	1	+8	18	3	+15	433	261	+172	2	Advance to Play-off C1
2	Estonia [17/43]	2	1	1	6	4	+2	13	9	+4	392	333	+59	1	Advance to Play-off C2
3	Mongolia [17/43]	2	0	2	0	10	−10	1	20	−19	213	444	−231	0	Advance to Play-off C3

First match(es) will be played: 30 September 2019. Source: TS

==== Switzerland vs Estonia ====
Switzerland
4
Kazan Gymnastics Center, Court 6
30 September 2019, 12:00 UTC+3

Estonia
1

			1	2	3
1	(Switzerland) (Estonia)	Yann Orteu / Julie Franconville; Artur Ajupov / Ramona Üprus	21; 11	21; 11
2	(Switzerland) (Estonia)	Doubia Pelupessy; Catlyn Kruus	19; 21	21; 14	21; 16
3	(Switzerland) (Estonia)	Arthur Boudier; Hans-Kristjan Pilve	15; 21	18; 21
4	(Switzerland) (Estonia)	Dounia Pelupessy / Milena Schnider; Catlyn Kruus / Ramona Üprus	21; 16	21; 19
5	(Switzerland) (Estonia)	Yann Orteu / Pham Minh Quang; Artur Ajupov / Hans-Kristjan Pilve	21; 9	21; 12

==== Mongolia vs Estonia ====
Mongolia
0
Kazan Gymnastics Center, Court 2
30 September 2019, 19:30 UTC+3

Estonia
5

			1	2	3
1	(Mongolia) (Estonia)	Yesun- Erdene Munkhbaatar / Munkhnar Lkhagvasuren; Artur Ajupov / Ramona Üprus	4; 21	9; 21
2	(Mongolia) (Estonia)	Kherlen Darkhanbaatar; Catlyn Kruus	13; 21	4; 21
3	(Mongolia) (Estonia)	Sumiyasuren Enkhbat; Hans-Kristjan Pilve	10; 21	10; 21
4	(Mongolia) (Estonia)	Kherlen Darkhanbaatar / Munkhnar Lkhagvasuren; Catlyn Kruus / Ramona Üprus	7; 21	10; 21
5	(Mongolia) (Estonia)	Sumiyasuren Enkhbat / Yesun- Erdene Munkhbaatar; Artur Ajupov / Hans-Kristjan Pilve	23; 21	11; 21	12; 21

==== Switzerland vs Mongolia ====
Switzerland
5
Kazan Gymnastics Center, Court 8
1 October 2019, 12:00 UTC+3

Mongolia
0

			1	2	3
1	(Switzerland) (Mongolia)	Pham Minh Quang / Caroline Racloz; Yesun-Erdene Munkhbaatar / Munkhnar Lkhagvasuren	21; 9	21; 6
2	(Switzerland) (Mongolia)	Milena Schnider; Kherlen Darkhanbaatar	21; 5	21; 5
3	(Switzerland) (Mongolia)	Arthur Boudier; Sumiyasuren Enkhbat	21; 18	24; 22
4	(Switzerland) (Mongolia)	Julie Franconville / Caroline Racloz; Kherlen Darkhanbaatar / Munkhnar Lkhagvasuren	21; 7	21; 8
5	(Switzerland) (Mongolia)	Yann Orteu / Pham Minh Quang; Sumiyasuren Enkhbat / Yesun-Erdene Munkhbaatar	21; 14	21; 6

=== Group C play-offs ===
Play-off C1
Thailand [3/4]	3
Switzerland [9/16]	0

Play-off C2
Belarus [17/43]	1
Estonia [17/43]	3

Play-off C3
Latvia [17/43]	3
Mongolia [17/43]	1

==== Play-off C1: Thailand vs Switzerland ====
Thailand
3
Kazan Gymnastics Center, Court 8
2 October 2019, 12:00 UTC+3

Switzerland
0

			1	2	3
1	(Thailand) (Switzerland)	Ratchapol Makkasasithorn / Benyapa Aimsaard; Pham Minh Quang / Milena Schnider	21; 7	21; 8
2	(Thailand) (Switzerland)	Phittayaporn Chaiwan; Dounia Pelupessy	21; 13	21; 8
3	(Thailand) (Switzerland)	Kunlavut Vitidsarn; Arthur Boudier	21; 8	21; 6
4	(Thailand) (Switzerland)	Pornpicha Choeikeewong / Pornnicha Suwatnodom; Julie Franconville / Caroline Racloz				not played
5	(Thailand) (Switzerland)	Thanawin Madee / Setthanan Piyawatcharavijit; Yann Orteu / Pham Minh Quang				not played

==== Play-off C2: Belarus vs Estonia ====
Belarus
1
Kazan Gymnastics Center, Court 4
1 October 2019, 19:00 UTC+3

Estonia
3

			1	2	3
1	(Belarus) (Estonia)	Ilya Larushyn / Hanna Bandarenka; Artur Ajupov / Ramona Üprus	21; 16	21; 17
2	(Belarus) (Estonia)	Veranika Tarusava; Catlyn Kruus	12; 21	19; 21
3	(Belarus) (Estonia)	Hleb Shvdkou; Hans-Kristjan Pilve	11; 21	18; 21
4	(Belarus) (Estonia)	Hanna Bandarenka / Veranika Tarusava; Catlyn Kruus / Ramona Üprus	16; 21	15; 21
5	(Belarus) (Estonia)	Aliaksandr Aliaksandrovich / Ilya Larushyn; Artur Ajupov / Hans-Kristjan Pilve				not played

==== Play-off C3: Latvia vs Mongolia ====
Latvia
3
Kazan Gymnastics Center, Court 3
1 October 2019, 19:00 UTC+3

Mongolia
1

			1	2	3
1	(Latvia) (Mongolia)	Alens Zandovskis / Amanda Azarova; Yesun-Erdene Munkhbaatar / Kherlen Darkhanbaatar	21; 17	21; 18
2	(Latvia) (Mongolia)	Diāna Stognija; Munkhnar Lkhagvasuren	21; 9	21; 1
3	(Latvia) (Mongolia)	Kristaps Vārna; Sumiyasuren Enkhbat	3; 21	4; 21
4	(Latvia) (Mongolia)	Anna Kupca / Annija Rulle-Titava; Kherlen Darkhanbaatar / Munkhnar Lkhagvasuren	21; 11	18; 21	21; 6
5	(Latvia) (Mongolia)	Martins Kirkums / Kristaps Vārna; Sumiyasuren Enkhbat / Yesun-Erdene Munkhbaatar				not played

== Group D ==
Pos	Team	Pld	W	L	MF	MA	MD	GF	GA	GD	PF	PA	PD	Pts	Qualification
1	France [9/16]	4	4	0	14	6	+8	33	17	+16	949	813	+136	4	Qualified to knockout stage 1st to 8th
2	England [5/8]	4	2	2	13	7	+6	29	20	+9	906	757	+149	2	Qualified to knockout stage 9th to 16th place
3	Czech Republic [17/43]	4	2	2	12	8	+4	27	20	+7	863	824	+39	2	Qualified to knockout stage 17th to 24th place
4	Sweden [17/43]	4	2	2	11	9	+2	29	22	+7	915	877	+38	2	Qualified to knockout stage 25th to 32nd place
5	Portugal [17/43]	4	0	4	0	20	−20	1	40	−39	496	858	−362	0	Qualified to knockout stage 33rd to 40th

First match(es) will be played: 30 September 2019. Source: TS

=== England vs Portugal ===
England
5
Kazan Gymnastics Center, Court 1
30 September 2019, 8:30 UTC+3

Portugal
0

			1	2	3
1	(England) (Portugal)	Rory Easton / Hope Warner; Rodrigo Almeida / Mariana Neves	21; 7	21; 10
2	(England) (Portugal)	Harry Huang; Hugo Fernandes	21; 6	21; 5
3	(England) (Portugal)	Pamela Reyes; Mariana Afonso	21; 3	21; 4
4	(England) (Portugal)	William Jones / Brandon Yap Zhi Hao; Joao Chang / Diogo Glória	21; 10	21; 8
5	(England) (Portugal)	Asmita Chaudhari / Annie Lado; Ana Fernandes / Mariana Neves	22; 20	21; 15

=== France vs Sweden ===
France
3
Kazan Gymnastics Center, Court 2
30 September 2019, 8:30 UTC+3

Sweden
2

			1	2	3
1	(France) (Sweden)	Kenji Lovang / Juliette Moinard; Gustav Bjorkler / Edith Urell	16; 21	21; 14	14; 21
2	(France) (Sweden)	Romane Cloteaux-Foucault; Cecilia Wang	21; 16	19; 21	21; 15
3	(France) (Sweden)	Christo Popov; Ludvig Petre Olsson	21; 15	17; 21	21; 15
4	(France) (Sweden)	Juliette Moinard / Flavie Vallet; Edith Urell / Cecilia Wang	21; 15	14; 21	11; 21
5	(France) (Sweden)	Kenji Lovang / Christo Popov; Jakob Ekman / Joel Hansson	21; 18	21; 10

=== Czech Republic vs Portugal ===
Czech Republic
5
Kazan Gymnastics Center, Court 5
30 September 2019, 15:30 UTC+3

Portugal
0

			1	2	3
1	(Czech Republic) (Portugal)	Tomáš Švejda / KateřIna Zuzakova; Rodrido Almeida / Mariana Neves	21; 17	21; 6
2	(Czech Republic) (Portugal)	KateřIna Mikelova; Ana Fernandes	21; 18	21; 16
3	(Czech Republic) (Portugal)	Jan Janostik; Diogo Gloria	21; 12	21; 16
4	(Czech Republic) (Portugal)	Lucie Krpatova / KateřIna Zuzakova; Ana Fernandes / Mariana Neves	21; 8	21; 13
5	(Czech Republic) (Portugal)	VíT Kulisek / Tomáš Švejda; Rodrido Almeida / Diogo Gloria	21; 18	21; 19

=== England vs Sweden ===
England
4
Kazan Gymnastics Center, Court 6
30 September 2019, 15:30 UTC+3

Sweden
1

			1	2	3
1	(England) (Sweden)	Rory Easton / Hope Warner; Gustav Bjorkler / Edith Urell	21; 14	14; 21	21; 13
2	(England) (Sweden)	Pamela Reyes; Cecilia Wang	21; 8	7; 21	21; 16
3	(England) (Sweden)	Harry Huang; Ludvig Petre Olsson	13; 21	21; 4	21; 9
4	(England) (Sweden)	Abbygael Harris / Hope Warner; Edith Urell / Cecilia Wang	17; 21	19; 21
5	(England) (Sweden)	Rory Easton / Ethan van Leeuwen; Gustav Bjorkler / Joel Hansson	21; 19	21; 13

=== France vs Portugal ===
France
5
Kazan Gymnastics Center, Court 7
1 October 2019, 8:30 UTC+3

Portugal
0

			1	2	3
1	(France) (Portugal)	Yanis Gaudin; Diogo Glória	21; 10	21; 18
2	(France) (Portugal)	Romane Cloteaux-Foucault; Cláudia Lourenço	21; 10	21; 14
3	(France) (Portugal)	Alex Lanier / Kenji Lovang; Hugo Fernandes / Diogo Glória	21; 9	21; 7
4	(France) (Portugal)	Flavie Vallet / Emilie Vercelot; Ana Fernandes / Cláudia Lourenço	21; 14	21; 16
5	(France) (Portugal)	Yanis Gaudin / Juliette Moinard; Rodrigo Almeida / Mariana Afonso	21; 7	21; 14

=== England vs Czech Republic ===
England
2
Kazan Gymnastics Center, Court 8
1 October 2019, 8:30 UTC+3

Czech Republic
3

			1	2	3
1	(England) (Czech Republic)	Ethan van Leeuwen / Annie Lado; Tomáš Švejda / Kateřina Zuzáková	14; 21	23; 25
2	(England) (Czech Republic)	Harry Huang; Jan Janoštík	10; 21	21; 14	21; 8
3	(England) (Czech Republic)	Pamela Reyes; Kateřina Mikelová	21; 14	21; 5
4	(England) (Czech Republic)	William Jones / Brandon Yap; Vít Kulíšek / Tomáš Švejda	21; 13	14; 21	14; 21
5	(England) (Czech Republic)	Asmita Chaudhari / Annie Lado; Lucie Krpatová / Kateřina Zuzáková	18; 21	21; 23

=== Sweden vs Portugal ===
Sweden
5
Kazan Gymnastics Center, Court 3
1 October 2019, 15:30 UTC+3

Portugal
0

			1	2	3
1	(Sweden) (Portugal)	Joel Hansson / Cecilia Wang; Rodrigo Almeida / Mariana Neves	21; 11	21; 12
2	(Sweden) (Portugal)	Edith Urell; Ana Fernandes	21; 13	21; 8
3	(Sweden) (Portugal)	Gustav Bjorkler; João Chang	17; 21	21; 18	21; 14
4	(Sweden) (Portugal)	Edith Urell / Cecilia Wang; Ana Fernandes / Cláudia Lourenço	21; 13	21; 6
5	(Sweden) (Portugal)	Jakob Ekman / Filip Karlborg; Rodrigo Almeida / Diogo Glória	21; 17	21; 13

=== France vs Czech Republic ===
France
3
Kazan Gymnastics Center, Court 4
1 October 2019, 15:30 UTC+3

Czech Republic
2

			1	2	3
1	(France) (Czech Republic)	Kenji Lovang / Juliette Moinard; Tomáš Švejda / Kateřina Zuzáková	21; 13	21; 16
2	(France) (Czech Republic)	Romane Cloteaux-Foucault; Kateřina Mikelová	12; 21	22; 20	11; 21
3	(France) (Czech Republic)	Christo Popov; Jan Janoštík	21; 12	21; 11
4	(France) (Czech Republic)	Juliette Moinard / Flavie Vallet; Lucie Krpatová / Kateřina Zuzáková	22; 24	9; 21
5	(France) (Czech Republic)	Kenji Lovang / Christo Popov; Vít Kulíšek / Tomáš Švejda	17; 21	21; 14	21; 18

=== England vs France ===
England
2
Kazan Gymnastics Center, Court 3
2 October 2019, 8:30 UTC+3

France
3

			1	2	3
1	(England) (France)	Rory Easton / Hope Warner; Kenji Lovang / Juliette Moinard	17; 21	12; 21
2	(England) (France)	Pamela Reyes; Romane Cloteaux-Foucault	17; 21	21; 11	21; 15
3	(England) (France)	Harry Huang; Christo Popov	14; 21	21; 18	13; 21
4	(England) (France)	Abbygael Harris / Annie Lado; Juliette Moinard / Emilie Vercelot	21; 15	11; 21	16; 21
5	(England) (France)	Rory Easton / Ethan van Leeuwen; Kenji Lovang / Christo Popov	12; 21	21; 17	21; 17

=== Czech Republic vs Sweden ===
Czech Republic
2
Kazan Gymnastics Center, Court 7
2 October 2019, 8:30 UTC+3

Sweden
3

			1	2	3
1	(Czech Republic) (Sweden)	Tomáš Švejda / Kateřina Zuzáková; Gustav Bjorkler / Cecilia Wang	15; 21	21; 13	21; 18
2	(Czech Republic) (Sweden)	Kateřina Mikelová; Edith Urell	17; 21	15; 21
3	(Czech Republic) (Sweden)	Jan Janoštík; Ludvig Petre Olsson	18; 21	19; 21
4	(Czech Republic) (Sweden)	Lucie Krpatová / Kateřina Zuzáková; Edith Urell / Cecilia Wang	18; 21	21; 14	13; 21
5	(Czech Republic) (Sweden)	Vít Kulíšek / Tomáš Švejda; Jakob Ekman / Joel Hansson	14; 21	21; 12	21; 18

== Group E ==
Pos	Team	Pld	W	L	MF	MA	MD	GF	GA	GD	PF	PA	PD	Pts	Qualification
1	Japan [9/16]	4	4	0	19	1	+18	38	4	+34	876	485	+391	4	Qualified to knockout stage 1st to 8th
2	India [5/8]	4	3	1	14	6	+8	30	15	+15	884	655	+229	3	Qualified to knockout stage 9th to 16th place
3	United States [17/43]	4	2	2	10	10	0	23	23	0	805	774	+31	2	Qualified to knockout stage 17th to 24th place
4	Australia [17/43]	4	1	3	7	13	−6	19	28	−9	781	829	−48	1	Qualified to knockout stage 25th to 32nd place
5	Armenia [17/43]	4	0	4	0	20	−20	0	40	−40	237	840	−603	0	Qualified to knockout stage 33rd to 40th

First match(es) will be played: 30 September 2019. Source: TS

=== India vs United States ===
India
4
Kazan Gymnastics Center, Court 3
30 September 2019, 8:30 UTC+3

United States
1

			1	2	3
1	(India) (United States)	Ishaan Bhatnagar / Tanisha Crasto; Jacob Zhang / Jessica Wang	22; 20	21; 9
2	(India) (United States)	Meiraba Maisnam; Alexander Zheng	21; 9	21; 11
3	(India) (United States)	Tasnim Mir; Natalie Chi	21; 19	25; 23
4	(India) (United States)	Manjit Singh / Khwairakpam Iman Sonowal; William Hu / Joshua Yuan	23; 25	19; 21
5	(India) (United States)	Aditi Bhatt / Tanisha Crasto; Katelin Ngo / Esther Shi	21; 16	15; 21	21; 7

=== Japan vs Armenia ===
Japan
5
Kazan Gymnastics Center, Court 4
30 September 2019, 8:30 UTC+3

Armenia
0

			1	2	3
1	(Japan) (Armenia)	Tsubasa Kawamura / Rui Hirokami; Mikayel Harutyunyan / Elen Tiraturyan	21; 4	21; 5
2	(Japan) (Armenia)	Akari Kurihara; Gayane Mamajanyan	21; 2	21; 4
3	(Japan) (Armenia)	Shotaro Inamitsu; Arman Vardanyan	21; 7	21; 7
4	(Japan) (Armenia)	Atsumi Miyazaki / Chihiro Uchiyama; Gayane Mamahanyan / Elen Tiraturyan	21; 6	21; 6
5	(Japan) (Armenia)	Hiroki Nishi / Takumi Shibata; Mikayel Harutyunyan / Arman Vardanyan	21; 4	21; 3

=== Australia vs United States ===
Australia
1
Kazan Gymnastics Center, Court 7
30 September 2019, 15:30 UTC+3

United States
4

			1	2	3
1	(Australia) (United States)	Jack Yu / Kaitlyn Ea; Jacob Zhang / Jessia Wang	18; 21	19; 21
2	(Australia) (United States)	Angela Yu; Esther Shi	21; 18	19; 21	15; 21
3	(Australia) (United States)	Rio Agustino; Alexander Zheng	13; 21	21; 17	14; 21
4	(Australia) (United States)	Kaitlyn Ea / Angela Yu; Natalie Chi / Katelin Ngo	17; 21	21; 13	17; 21
5	(Australia) (United States)	Ricky Tang / Otto Zhao; William Hu / Joshua Yuan	14; 21	22; 20	21; 18

=== India vs Armenia ===
India
5
Kazan Gymnastics Center, Court 8
30 September 2019, 15:30 UTC+3

Armenia
0

			1	2	3
1	(India) (Armenia)	Ishaan Bhatnagar / Tanisha Crasto; Mikayel Harutyunyan / Elen Tiraturyan	21; 2	21; 4
2	(India) (Armenia)	Trisha Hegde; Gayane Mamajanyan	21; 6	21; 4
3	(India) (Armenia)	Sathish Karunakaran; Arman Vardanyan	21; 6	21; 7
4	(India) (Armenia)	Treesa Jolly / Varshini Viswanath Sri; Gayane Mamajanyan / Elen Tiraturyan	21; 4	21; 1
5	(India) (Armenia)	Manjit Singh Khwairakpam / Dingku Singh Konthoujam; Mikayel Harutyunyan / Arman Vardanyan	21; 3	21; 4

=== Japan vs United States ===
Japan
5
Kazan Gymnastics Center, Court 5
1 October 2019, 8:30 UTC+3

United States
0

			1	2	3
1	(Japan) (United States)	Tsubasa Kawamura / Rui Hirokami; Jacob Zhang / Jessica Wang	23; 21	18; 21	21; 7
2	(Japan) (United States)	Riko Gunji; Katelin Ngo	21; 9	21; 10
3	(Japan) (United States)	Takuma Kawamoto; Alexander Zheng	21; 8	21; 9
4	(Japan) (United States)	Kaho Osawa / Hinata Suzuki; Natalie Chi / Katelin Ngo	21; 15	21; 14
5	(Japan) (United States)	Yoshifumi Fujisawa / Kakeru Kumagai; William Hu / Joshua Yuan	21; 13	21; 12

=== India vs Australia ===
India
4
Kazan Gymnastics Center, Court 6
1 October 2019, 8:30 UTC+3

Australia
1

			1	2	3
1	(India) (Australia)	Ishaan Bhatnagar / Tanisha Crasto; Jack Yu / Kaitlyn Ea	21; 17	20; 22	21; 11
2	(India) (Australia)	Meiraba Maisnam; Rio Agustino	21; 17	21; 11
3	(India) (Australia)	Tasnim Mir; Angela Yu	21; 11	21; 15
4	(India) (Australia)	Manjit Singh Khwairakpam / Dingku Singh Konthoujam; Ricky Tang / Otto Zhao	17; 21	21; 8	21; 14
5	(India) (Australia)	Aditi Bhatt / Tanisha Crasto; Victoria He / Angela Yu	17; 21	21; 18	15; 21

=== Armenia vs United States ===
Armenia
0
Kazan Gymnastics Center, Court 1
1 October 2019, 15:30 UTC+3

United States
5

			1	2	3
1	(Armenia) (United States)	Mikayel Harutyunyan / Elen Tiraturyan; Alexander Zheng / Esther Shi	4; 21	5; 21
2	(Armenia) (United States)	Gayane Mamajanyan; Natalie Chi	8; 21	4; 21
3	(Armenia) (United States)	Arman Vardanyan; Jacob Zhang	7; 21	6; 21
4	(Armenia) (United States)	Gayane Mamajanyan / Elen Tiraturyan; Esther Shi / Jessica Wang	8; 21	9; 21
5	(Armenia) (United States)	Mikayel Harutyunyan / Arman Vardanyan; William Hu / Joshua Yuan	7; 21	4; 21

=== Japan vs Australia ===
Japan
5
Kazan Gymnastics Center, Court 2
1 October 2019, 15:30 UTC+3

Australia
0

			1	2	3
1	(Japan) (Australia)	Kakeru Kumagai / Atsumi Miyazaki; Jack Yu / Victoria He	21; 15	21; 14
2	(Japan) (Australia)	Chihiro Uchiyama; Bernice Teoh	21; 5	21; 10
3	(Japan) (Australia)	Riki Takei; Rio Agustino	21; 8	21; 12
4	(Japan) (Australia)	Rui Hirokami / Mizuki Otake; Kaitlyn Ea / Angela Yu	21; 14	21; 16
5	(Japan) (Australia)	Takuma Kawamoto / Tsubasa Kawamura; Ricky Tang / Otto Zhao	21; 8	21; 10

=== India vs Japan ===
India
1
Kazan Gymnastics Center, Court 4
2 October 2019, 8:30 UTC+3

Japan
4

			1	2	3
1	(India) (Japan)	Ishaan Bhatnagar / Tanisha Crasto; Kakeru Kumagai / Atsumi Miyazaki	21; 18	21; 18
2	(India) (Japan)	Tasnim Mir; Riko Gunji	9; 21	12; 21
3	(India) (Japan)	Meiraba Maisnam; Takuma Kawamoto	17; 21	21; 17	21; 23
4	(India) (Japan)	Treesa Jolly / Varshini Viswanath Sri; Kaho Osawa / Hinata Suzuki	12; 21	22; 24
5	(India) (Japan)	Manjit Singh Khwairakpam / Dingku Singh Konthoujam; Yoshifumi Fujisawa / Kakeru Kumagai	16; 21	14; 21

=== Australia vs Armenia ===
Australia
5
Kazan Gymnastics Center, Court 8
2 October 2019, 8:30 UTC+3

Armenia
0

			1	2	3
1	(Australia) (Armenia)	Jack Yu / Angela Yu; Mikayel Harutyunyan / Elen Tiraturyan	21; 7	21; 10
2	(Australia) (Armenia)	Bernice Teoh; Gayane Mamajanyan	21; 11	21; 7
3	(Australia) (Armenia)	Jack Yu; Arman Vardanyan	21; 7	21; 8
4	(Australia) (Armenia)	Kaitlyn Ea / Victoria He; Gayane Mamajanyan / Elen Tiraturyan	21; 5	21; 11
5	(Australia) (Armenia)	Ricky Tang / Otto Zhao; Mikayel Harutyunyan / Arman Vardanyan	21; 10	21; 10

== Group F ==
Pos	Team	Pld	W	L	MF	MA	MD	GF	GA	GD	PF	PA	PD	Pts	Qualification
1	South Korea [3/4]	4	4	0	17	3	+14	35	8	+27	854	581	+273	4	Qualified to knockout stage 1st to 8th
2	Singapore [9/16]	4	3	1	15	5	+10	33	15	+18	958	757	+201	3	Qualified to knockout stage 9th to 16th place
3	Slovakia [17/43]	4	2	2	9	11	−2	20	23	−3	730	787	−57	2	Qualified to knockout stage 17th to 24th place
4	Sri Lanka [17/43]	4	1	3	7	13	−6	16	28	−12	699	831	−132	1	Qualified to knockout stage 25th to 32nd place
5	Peru [17/43]	4	0	4	2	18	−16	6	36	−30	580	865	−285	0	Qualified to knockout stage 33rd to 40th

First match(es) will be played: 30 September 2019. Source: TS

=== South Korea vs Peru ===
South Korea
5
Kazan Gymnastics Center, Court 7
30 September 2019, 12:00 UTC+3

Peru
0

			1	2	3
1	(South Korea) (Peru)	Choi Hyo-won; Fernanda Saponara	21; 10	21; 13
2	(South Korea) (Peru)	Kim Byung-jae; Nicolas Macias	21; 14	21; 8
3	(South Korea) (Peru)	Jeong Da-yeon / Kim Ae-lin; Micaela Flores / Inés Mendoza	21; 9	21; 9
4	(South Korea) (Peru)	An Yun-seong / Lee Yoo-jun; Mariano Novoa / Brian Roque	21; 9	21; 5
5	(South Korea) (Peru)	Jo Seong-min / Kim Yun-ju; Nicolas Macias / Fernanda Saponara	21; 17	21; 12

=== Singapore vs Slovakia ===
Singapore
4
Kazan Gymnastics Center, Court 8
30 September 2019, 12:00 UTC+3

Slovakia
1

			1	2	3
1	(Singapore) (Slovakia)	Darrion Michael Ng / Ong Xi Qing; Jakub Horak / Mia Tarcalova	19; 21	25; 23	19; 21
2	(Singapore) (Slovakia)	Nigel Yap; Andrej Antoska	15; 21	21; 14	21; 11
3	(Singapore) (Slovakia)	Insyirah Khan; Sofia Slosiarikova	21; 12	21; 8
4	(Singapore) (Slovakia)	Howin Wong / Aaron Yong; Andrej Antoska / Jakub Horak	21; 11	21; 17
5	(Singapore) (Slovakia)	Joey Koh / Megan Lee; Mia Tarcalova / Lucia Vojtekova	21; 19	21; 17

=== Sri Lanka vs Peru ===
Sri Lanka
4
Kazan Gymnastics Center, Court 3
30 September 2019, 19:30 UTC+3

Peru
1

			1	2	3
1	(Sri Lanka) (Peru)	Thulith Thewmika Palliyaguru / Anurangi Masakorala; Mariano Novoa / Inés Mendoza	20; 22	15; 21
2	(Sri Lanka) (Peru)	Dilmi Dias; Fernanda Saponara	21; 13	21; 14
3	(Sri Lanka) (Peru)	Lochana de Silva; Nicolas Macias	21; 16	19; 21	21; 15
4	(Sri Lanka) (Peru)	Dilmi Dias / Anurangi Masakorala; Micaela Flores / Fernanda Saponara	21; 15	21; 16
5	(Sri Lanka) (Peru)	Lochana de Silva / Thulith Thewmika Palliyaguru; Nicolas Macias / Brian Roque	21; 13	21; 16

=== South Korea vs Slovakia ===
South Korea
5
Kazan Gymnastics Center, Court 4
30 September 2019, 19:30 UTC+3

Slovakia
0

			1	2	3
1	(South Korea) (Slovakia)	Jo Seong-min / Kim Yun-ju; Andrej Antoska / Lucia Vojtekova	18; 21	21; 14	21; 13
2	(South Korea) (Slovakia)	Seo Bo-hyun; Sofia Slosiarikova	21; 5	21; 7
3	(South Korea) (Slovakia)	Kim Tae-rim; Jakub Horak	21; 10	21; 11
4	(South Korea) (Slovakia)	Jeong Da-yeon / Kim Ae-lin; Mia Tarcalova / Lucia Vojtekova	21; 16	21; 19
5	(South Korea) (Slovakia)	An Yun-seong / Lee Yoo-jun; Andrej Antoska / Jakub Horak	21; 19	21; 11

=== Singapore vs Peru ===
Singapore
5
Kazan Gymnastics Center, Court 5
1 October 2019, 12:00 UTC+3

Peru
0

			1	2	3
1	(Singapore) (Peru)	Aaron Yong / Joey Koh; Nicolás Macías / Fernanda Saponara	21; 16	18; 23	21; 12
2	(Singapore) (Peru)	Megan Lee; Micaela Flores	21; 9	21; 15
3	(Singapore) (Peru)	Benjamin Lee; Brian Roque	21; 14	21; 16
4	(Singapore) (Peru)	Insyirah Khan / Ong Xi Qing; Micaela Flores / Inés Mendoza	21; 18	21; 13
5	(Singapore) (Peru)	Darrion Michael Ng / Justyn Sim; Nicolás Macías / Brian Roque	21; 7	21; 7

=== South Korea vs Sri Lanka ===
South Korea
5
Kazan Gymnastics Center, Court 6
1 October 2019, 12:00 UTC+3

Sri Lanka
0

			1	2	3
1	(South Korea) (Sri Lanka)	Jo Seong-min / Kim Yun-ju; Thulith Palliyaguru / Anurangi Masakorala	21; 13	21; 9
2	(South Korea) (Sri Lanka)	Lee Na-rin; Dilmi Dias	17; 21	12; 21
3	(South Korea) (Sri Lanka)	Kim Byung-jae; Lochana de Silva	21; 12	21; 11
4	(South Korea) (Sri Lanka)	Jeong Da-yeon / Kim Ae-lin; Chamudi Abeywickrama / Panchali Adhikari	21; 2	21; 6
5	(South Korea) (Sri Lanka)	An Yun-seong / Lee Yoo-jun; Chamath Dias / Chirath Illeperumachchi	21; 9	21; 9

=== Slovakia vs Peru ===
Slovakia
4
Kazan Gymnastics Center, Court 1
1 October 2019, 19:00 UTC+3

Peru
1

			1	2	3
1	(Slovakia) (Peru)	Jakub Horák / Mia Tarcalová; Brian Roque / Micaela Flores	21; 17	21; 5
2	(Slovakia) (Peru)	Sofia Slosiariková; Fernanda Saponara	21; 23	13; 21
3	(Slovakia) (Peru)	Andrej Antoška; Nicolás Macías	21; 18	21; 11
4	(Slovakia) (Peru)	Mia Tarcalová / Lucia Vojteková; Micaela Flores / Inés Mendoza	21; 15	21; 9
5	(Slovakia) (Peru)	Andrej Antoška / Jakub Horák; Mariano Novoa / Brian Roque	21; 12	21; 11

=== Singapore vs Sri Lanka ===
Singapore
4
Kazan Gymnastics Center, Court 2
1 October 2019, 19:00 UTC+3

Sri Lanka
1

			1	2	3
1	(Singapore) (Sri Lanka)	Darrion Michael Ng / Ong Xi Qing; Chamath Dias / Anurangi Masakorala	21; 9	21; 15
2	(Singapore) (Sri Lanka)	Insyirah Khan; Dilmi Dias	21; 5	21; 18
3	(Singapore) (Sri Lanka)	Nigel Yap; Lochana de Silva	22; 24	21; 12	21; 10
4	(Singapore) (Sri Lanka)	Joey Koh / Megan Lee; Dilmi Dias / Anurangi Masakorala	19; 21	21; 17	19; 21
5	(Singapore) (Sri Lanka)	Howin Wong / Aaron Yong; Lochana de Silva / Thulith Palliyaguru	16; 21	21; 10	21; 10

=== South Korea vs Singapore ===
South Korea
3
Kazan Gymnastics Center, Court 4
2 October 2019, 12:00 UTC+3

Singapore
2

			1	2	3
1	(South Korea) (Singapore)	Jo Seong-min / Kim Yun-ju; Darrion Michael Ng / Ong Xi Qing	21; 19	21; 19
2	(South Korea) (Singapore)	Choi Hyo-won; Insyirah Khan	15; 21	7; 21
3	(South Korea) (Singapore)	Kim Tae-rim; Nigel Yap	21; 16	18; 21	16; 21
4	(South Korea) (Singapore)	Jeong Da-yeon / Kim Ae-lin; Joey Koh / Megan Lee	21; 11	21; 13
5	(South Korea) (Singapore)	An Yun-seong / Lee Yoo-jun; Howin Wong / Aaron Yong	21; 13	15; 21	22; 20

=== Sri Lanka vs Slovakia ===
Sri Lanka
1
Kazan Gymnastics Center, Court 5
2 October 2019, 12:00 UTC+3

Slovakia
4

			1	2	3
1	(Sri Lanka) (Slovakia)	Chamath Dias / Anurangi Masakorala; Jakub Horák / Mia Tarcalová	17; 21	17; 21
2	(Sri Lanka) (Slovakia)	Dilmi Dias; Sofia Slosiariková	21; 8	21; 11
3	(Sri Lanka) (Slovakia)	Lochana de Silva; Andrej Antoška	19; 21	12; 21
4	(Sri Lanka) (Slovakia)	Dilmi Dias / Anurangi Masakorala; Mia Tarcalová / Lucia Vojteková	19; 21	16; 21
5	(Sri Lanka) (Slovakia)	Lochana De Silva / Thulith Palliyaguru; Andrej Antoška / Jakub Horák	18; 21	11; 21

== Group G ==
Pos	Team	Pld	W	L	MF	MA	MD	GF	GA	GD	PF	PA	PD	Pts	Qualification
1	Denmark [5/8]	4	4	0	18	2	+16	36	7	+29	870	519	+351	4	Qualified to knockout stage 1st to 8th
2	Chinese Taipei [9/16]	4	3	1	17	3	+14	36	6	+30	858	476	+382	3	Qualified to knockout stage 9th to 16th place
3	New Zealand [17/43]	4	2	2	10	10	0	21	20	+1	646	710	−64	2	Qualified to knockout stage 17th to 24th place
4	Uzbekistan [17/43]	4	1	3	4	16	−12	8	33	−25	552	802	−250	1	Qualified to knockout stage 25th to 32nd place
5	Faroe Islands [17/43]	4	0	4	1	19	−18	3	38	−35	438	857	−419	0	Qualified to knockout stage 33rd to 40th

First match(es) will be played: 30 September 2019. Source: TS

=== Denmark vs New Zealand ===
Denmark
5
Kazan Gymnastics Center, Court 7
30 September 2019, 8:30 UTC+3

New Zealand
0

			1	2	3
1	(Denmark) (New Zealand)	Rasmus Espersen / Christine Busch; Jack Wang / Janice Jiang	21; 9	21; 8
2	(Denmark) (New Zealand)	Magnus Johannesen; Edward Lau	21; 17	18; 21	21; 13
3	(Denmark) (New Zealand)	Sophia Grundtvig; Ella Smith	21; 8	21; 6
4	(Denmark) (New Zealand)	William Kryger Boe / Mads Vestergaard; Joshua Feng / Ryan Tong	21; 8	21; 15
5	(Denmark) (New Zealand)	Christine Busch / Amalie Schulz; Catelyn Rozario / Jenny Zhu	21; 9	21; 11

=== Chinese Taipei vs Faroe Islands ===
Chinese Taipei
5
Kazan Gymnastics Center, Court 8
30 September 2019, 8:30 UTC+3

Faroe Islands
0

			1	2	3
1	(Chinese Taipei) (Faroe Islands)	Wei Chun-wei / Wu Guan-xun; Árant á Mýrini / Ari M. Jacobsen	21; 6	21; 8
2	(Chinese Taipei) (Faroe Islands)	Tung Ciou-tong; Lena Maria Joensen	21; 9	21; 3
3	(Chinese Taipei) (Faroe Islands)	Yu Sheng-po; Jonas Djurhuus	21; 8	21; 3
4	(Chinese Taipei) (Faroe Islands)	Chiang Yi-hsuan / Sun Wen-pei; Alma Kentsdóttir Mohr Pedersen / Sissal Thomsen	21; 2	21; 8
5	(Chinese Taipei) (Faroe Islands)	Wang Po-wei / Yeo Ying-chee; Árant á Mýrini / Lena Maria Joensen	21; 14	21; 12

=== Uzbekistan vs New Zealand ===
Uzbekistan
0
Kazan Gymnastics Center, Court 3
30 September 2019, 15:30 UTC+3

New Zealand
5

			1	2	3
1	(Uzbekistan) (New Zealand)	Asadbek Olimjanov / Madina Ganieva; Edward Lau / Janice Jiang	9; 21	13; 21
2	(Uzbekistan) (New Zealand)	Sevinch Sodikova; Jenny Zhu	18; 21	11; 21
3	(Uzbekistan) (New Zealand)	Abdurashid Muminov; Ryan Tong	11; 21	16; 21
4	(Uzbekistan) (New Zealand)	Gulassar Bokieva / Sevinch Sodikova; Janice Jiang / Ella Smith	18; 21	18; 21
5	(Uzbekistan) (New Zealand)	Biloliddin Kuchkarboev / Azamat Sultanov; Joshua Feng / Edward Lau	15; 21	16; 21

=== Denmark vs Faroe Islands ===
Denmark
5
Kazan Gymnastics Center, Court 4
30 September 2019, 15:30 UTC+3

Faroe Islands
0

			1	2	3
1	(Denmark) (Faroe Islands)	William Kryger Boe / Amalie Cecilie Kudsk; Jonas Djurhuus / Sissal Thomsen	21; 8	21; 9
2	(Denmark) (Faroe Islands)	Frederikke Lund; Alma Kentsdóttir Mohr Pedersen	21; 8	21; 3
3	(Denmark) (Faroe Islands)	Christopher Vittoriani; Árant Á. Mýrini	21; 5	21; 7
4	(Denmark) (Faroe Islands)	Natasja P. Anthonisen / Clara Graversen; Lena Maria Joensen / Alma Kentsdóttir Mohr Pedersen	21; 5	21; 2
5	(Denmark) (Faroe Islands)	Rasmus Espersen / Marcus Rindshøj; Jonas Djurhuus / Ari M. Jacobsen	21; 11	21; 8

=== Chinese Taipei vs New Zealand ===
Chinese Taipei
5
Kazan Gymnastics Center, Court 1
1 October 2019, 8:30 UTC+3

New Zealand
0

			1	2	3
1	(Chinese Taipei) (New Zealand)	Chiang Chien-wei / Wang Xin-yu; Jack Wang / Janice Jiang	21; 15	21; 4
2	(Chinese Taipei) (New Zealand)	Hung En-tzu; Catelyn Rozario	21; 7	21; 10
3	(Chinese Taipei) (New Zealand)	Su Li-yang; Joshua Feng	21; 9	21; 6
4	(Chinese Taipei) (New Zealand)	Chiang Yi-hsuan / Sun Yu-hsing; Ella Smith / Jenny Zhu	21; 14	21; 13
5	(Chinese Taipei) (New Zealand)	Chen Zhi-ray / Cheng Kai-wen; Ryan Tong / Jack Wang	21; 11	21; 10

=== Denmark vs Uzbekistan ===
Denmark
5
Kazan Gymnastics Center, Court 2
1 October 2019, 8:30 UTC+3

Uzbekistan
0

			1	2	3
1	(Denmark) (Uzbekistan)	Marcus Rindshøj / Clara Graversen; Asadbek Olimjanov / Madina Ganieva	21; 9	21; 8
2	(Denmark) (Uzbekistan)	Amalie Schulz; Gulassar Bokieva	21; 9	21; 13
3	(Denmark) (Uzbekistan)	Mads Juel Møller; Abdurashid Muminov	21; 8	21; 11
4	(Denmark) (Uzbekistan)	Sophia Grundtvig / Amalie Cecilie Kudsk; Gulassar Bokieva / Sevinch Sodikova	21; 13	21; 6
5	(Denmark) (Uzbekistan)	William Kryger Boe / Mads Vestergaard; Biloliddin Kuchkarboev / Abdurashid Muminov	21; 7	21; 16

=== Faroe Islands vs New Zealand ===
Faroe Islands
0
Kazan Gymnastics Center, Court 5
1 October 2019, 15:30 UTC+3

New Zealand
5

			1	2	3
1	(Faroe Islands) (New Zealand)	Jonas Djurhuus / Ari M. Jacobsen; Ryan Tong / Jack Wang	11; 21	13; 21
2	(Faroe Islands) (New Zealand)	Alma Kentsdóttir Mohr Pedersen / Sissal Thomsen; Janice Jiang / Catelyn Rozario	21; 23	13; 21
3	(Faroe Islands) (New Zealand)	Árant á Mýrini; Edward Lau	8; 21	5; 21
4	(Faroe Islands) (New Zealand)	Lena Maria Joensen; Jenny Zhu	14; 21	14; 21
5	(Faroe Islands) (New Zealand)	Jonas Djurhuus / Alma Kentsdóttir Mohr Pedersen; Edward Lau / Janice Jiang	14; 21	14; 21

=== Chinese Taipei vs Uzbekistan ===
Chinese Taipei
5
Kazan Gymnastics Center, Court 6
1 October 2019, 15:30 UTC+3

Uzbekistan
0

			1	2	3
1	(Chinese Taipei) (Uzbekistan)	Chiang Chien-wei / Sun Yu-hsing; Azamat Sultanov / Kunduzoy Ollaberganova	21; 5	21; 11
2	(Chinese Taipei) (Uzbekistan)	Tsai Hsin-pei; Sevinch Sodikova	21; 6	21; 7
3	(Chinese Taipei) (Uzbekistan)	Lin Kuan-ting; Biloliddin Kuchkarboev	21; 17	21; 8
4	(Chinese Taipei) (Uzbekistan)	Jiang Pin-yue / Ting Ya-yun; Gulassar Bokieva / Sevinch Sodikova	21; 7	21; 11
5	(Chinese Taipei) (Uzbekistan)	Wei Chun-wei / Wu Guan-xun; Biloliddin Kuchkarboev / Asadbek Olimjanov	21; 2	21; 8

=== Denmark vs Chinese Taipei ===
Denmark
3
Kazan Gymnastics Center, Court 2
2 October 2019, 8:30 UTC+3

Chinese Taipei
2

			1	2	3
1	(Denmark) (Chinese Taipei)	Rasmus Espersen / Christine Busch; Chiang Chien-wei / Sun Yu-hsing	11; 21	22; 20	21; 14
2	(Denmark) (Chinese Taipei)	Amalie Schulz; Hung En-tzu	18; 21	21; 15	21; 18
3	(Denmark) (Chinese Taipei)	Magnus Johannesen; Yu Sheng-po	16; 21	18; 21
4	(Denmark) (Chinese Taipei)	Christine Busch / Amalie Schulz; Chiang Yi-hsuan / Sun Yu-hsing	21; 18	21; 17
5	(Denmark) (Chinese Taipei)	Marcus Rindshøj / Mads Vestergaard; Chen Zhi-ray / Cheng Kai-wen	18; 21	14; 21

=== Uzbekistan vs Faroe Islands ===
Uzbekistan
4
Kazan Gymnastics Center, Court 6
2 October 2019, 8:30 UTC+3

Faroe Islands
1

			1	2	3
1	(Uzbekistan) (Faroe Islands)	Azamat Sultanov / Sevinch Sodikova; Jonas Djurhuus / Alma Kentsdóttir Mohr Pedersen	21; 11	21; 16
2	(Uzbekistan) (Faroe Islands)	Gulassar Bokieva; Sissal Thomsen	21; 7	19; 21	21; 17
3	(Uzbekistan) (Faroe Islands)	Biloliddin Kuchkarboev; Árant á Mýrini	21; 16	21; 14
4	(Uzbekistan) (Faroe Islands)	Gulassar Bokieva / Sevinch Sodikova; Alma Kentsdóttir Mohr Pedersen / Sissal Thomsen	21; 9	21; 19
5	(Uzbekistan) (Faroe Islands)	Biloliddin Kuchkarboev / Abdurashid Muminov; Jonas Djurhuus / Ari M. Jacobsen	19; 21	19; 21

== Group H ==
=== Group H1 ===
Pos	Team	Pld	W	L	MF	MA	MD	GF	GA	GD	PF	PA	PD	Pts	Qualification
1	China [2]	2	2	0	10	0	+10	20	0	+20	420	149	+271	2	Advance to Play-off H1
2	Scotland [17/43]	2	1	1	5	5	0	10	10	0	284	356	−72	1	Advance to Play-off H2
3	Norway [17/43]	2	0	2	0	5	−5	0	20	−20	221	420	−199	0	Advance to Play-off H3

First match(es) will be played: 30 September 2019. Source: TS

==== China vs Norway ====
China
5
Kazan Gymnastics Center, Court 3
30 September 2019, 12:00 UTC+3

Norway
0

			1	2	3
1	(China) (Norway)	Feng Yanzhe / Lin Fangling; Jonas Østhassel / Aimee Hong	21; 16	21; 3
2	(China) (Norway)	Tan Ning; Sofia Macsali	21; 9	21; 7
3	(China) (Norway)	Li Yunze; Ludvig Smith-Meyer	21; 4	21; 6
4	(China) (Norway)	Li Yijing / Zhang Chi; Sofia Macsali / Emilia Petersen Norberg	21; 8	21; 9
5	(China) (Norway)	Di Zijian / Wang Chang; Ludvig Smith-Meyer / Jonas Østhassel	21; 6	21; 7

==== Scotland vs Norway ====
Scotland
5
Kazan Gymnastics Center, Court 7
30 September 2019, 19:30 UTC+3

Norway
0

			1	2	3
1	(Scotland) (Norway)	Adam Pringle / Rachel Andrew; Jonas Østhassel / Aimee Hong	21; 13	21; 7
2	(Scotland) (Norway)	Rachel Sugden; Sofia Macsali	21; 16	21; 15
3	(Scotland) (Norway)	Joshua Apiliga; Danila Gataullin	21; 19	21; 18
4	(Scotland) (Norway)	Rachel Andrew / Rachel Sugden; Sofia Macsali / Emilia Petersen Norberg	21; 18	21; 15
5	(Scotland) (Norway)	Joshua Apiliga / Adam Pringle; Ludvig Smith-Meyer / Jonas Østhassel	21; 11	21; 14

==== China vs Scotland ====
China
5
Kazan Gymnastics Center, Court 1
1 October 2019, 12:00 UTC+3

Scotland
0

			1	2	3
1	(China) (Scotland)	Feng Yanzhe / Lin Fangling; Adam Pringle / Rachel Andrew	21; 10	21; 7
2	(China) (Scotland)	Zhou Meng; Rachel Cameron	21; 7	21; 4
3	(China) (Scotland)	Liu Liang; Callum Smith	21; 10	21; 5
4	(China) (Scotland)	Li Yijing / Tan Ning; Alice Campbell / Rachel Sugden	21; 4	21; 9
5	(China) (Scotland)	Di Zijian / Wang Chang; Joshua Apiliga / Michael McGuire	21; 10	21; 8

=== Group H2 ===
Pos	Team	Pld	W	L	MF	MA	MD	GF	GA	GD	PF	PA	PD	Pts	Qualification
1	Germany [9/16]	2	2	0	10	0	+10	20	0	+20	420	204	+216	2	Advance to Play-off H1
2	Lithuania [17/43]	2	1	1	5	5	0	10	10	0	331	329	+2	1	Advance to Play-off H2
3	Iceland [17/43]	2	0	2	0	10	−10	0	20	−20	202	420	−218	0	Advance to Play-off H3

First match(es) will be played: 30 September 2019. Source: TS

==== Germany vs Lithuania ====
Germany
5
Kazan Gymnastics Center, Court 4
30 September 2019, 12:00 UTC+3

Lithuania
0

			1	2	3
1	(Germany) (Lithuania)	Aaron Sonnenschein / Leona Michalski; Jonas Petkus / Gabija Mockutė	21; 9	21; 17
2	(Germany) (Lithuania)	Ann-Kathrin Spöri; Samanta Golubickaite	21; 9	21; 16
3	(Germany) (Lithuania)	Matthias Kicklitz; Danielius Beržanskis	21; 8	21; 19
4	(Germany) (Lithuania)	Leona Michalski / Emma Moszczynski; Samanta Golubickaite / Gabija Mockutė	21; 9	21; 11
5	(Germany) (Lithuania)	Marvin Datko / Kian-yu Oei; Danielius Beržanskis / Jonas Petkus	21; 11	21; 12

==== Iceland vs Lithuania ====
Iceland
0
Kazan Gymnastics Center, Court 8
30 September 2019, 19:30 UTC+3

Lithuania
5

			1	2	3
1	(Iceland) (Lithuania)	Brynjar Mar Ellertsson / Juliana Karitas Johannsdottir; Danielius Beržanskis / Gabija Mockutė	11; 21	15; 21
2	(Iceland) (Lithuania)	Lilja Bu; Samanta Golubickaite	7; 21	14; 21
3	(Iceland) (Lithuania)	Andri Broddason; Jonas Petkus	16; 21	11; 21
4	(Iceland) (Lithuania)	Juliana Karitas Johannsdottir / Karolina Prus; Samanta Golubickaite / Gabija Mockutė	17; 21	10; 21
5	(Iceland) (Lithuania)	Brynjar Mar Ellertsson / Gustav Nilsson; Danielius Beržanskis / Jonas Petkus	8; 21	10; 21

==== Germany vs Iceland ====
Germany
5
Kazan Gymnastics Center, Court 2
1 October 2019, 12:00 UTC+3

Iceland
0

			1	2	3
1	(Germany) (Iceland)	Marvin Datko / Emma Moszczynski; Gustav Nilsson / Juliana Karitas Johannsdottir	21; 6	21; 13
2	(Germany) (Iceland)	Aaron Sonnenschein; Andri Broddason	21; 8	21; 9
3	(Germany) (Iceland)	Leona Michalski; Juliana Karitas Johannsdottir	21; 8	21; 8
4	(Germany) (Iceland)	Matthias Kicklitz / Kian-yu Oei; Brynjar Mar Ellertsson / Gustav Nilsson	21; 9	21; 7
5	(Germany) (Iceland)	Emma Moszczynski / Ann-Kathrin Spöri; Lilja Bu / Karolina Prus	21; 9	21; 6

==== Group H play-offs ====
Play-off H1
China [2]	3
Germany [9/16]	0

Play-off H2
Scotland [17/43]	3
Lithuania [17/43]	0

Play-off H3
Norway [17/43]	3
Iceland [17/43]	0

==== Play-off H1: China vs Germany ====
China
5
Kazan Gymnastics Center, Court 1
2 October 2019, 12:00 UTC+3

Germany
0

			1	2	3
1	(China) (Germany)	Feng Yanzhe / Lin Fangling; Aaron Sonnenschein / Leona Michalski	21; 9	21; 8
2	(China) (Germany)	Zhou Meng; Ann-Kathrin Spoeri	21; 10	21; 11
3	(China) (Germany)	Liu Liang; Matthias Kicklitz	21; 12	21; 6
4	(China) (Germany)	Li Yijing / Tan Ning; Leona Michalski / Emma Moszczynski				w/o
5	(China) (Germany)	Di Zijian / Wang Chang; Marvin Datko / Aaron Sonnenschein	21; 17	21; 12

==== Play-off H2: Scotland vs Lithuania ====
Scotland
3
Kazan Gymnastics Center, Court 8
1 October 2019, 19:00 UTC+3

Lithuania
0

			1	2	3
1	(Scotland) (Lithuania)	Adam Pringle / Rachel Andrew; Jonas Petkus / Gabija Mockutė	21; 9	21; 12
2	(Scotland) (Lithuania)	Rachel Sugden; Samanta Golubickaite	21; 11	21; 15
3	(Scotland) (Lithuania)	Callum Smith; Danielius Beržanskis	21; 17	21; 17
4	(Scotland) (Lithuania)	Joshua Apiliga / Adam Pringle; Danielius Beržanskis / Jonas Petkus				not played
5	(Scotland) (Lithuania)	Rachel Andrew / Rachel Cameron; Samanta Golubickaite / Gabija Mockutė				not played

==== Play-off H3: Norway vs Iceland ====
Norway
3
Kazan Gymnastics Center, Court 7
1 October 2019, 19:00 UTC+3

Iceland
0

			1	2	3
1	(Norway) (Iceland)	Ludvig Smith-Meyer / Emilia Petersen Norberg; Gustav Nilsson / Juliana Karitas Johannsdottir	21; 8	21; 14
2	(Norway) (Iceland)	Marie Mørk; Lilja Bu	21; 8	21; 10
3	(Norway) (Iceland)	Danila Gataullin; Andri Broddason	21; 14	21; 8
4	(Norway) (Iceland)	Ludvig Smith-Meyer / Jonas Østhassel; Brynjar Mar Ellertsson / Gustav Nilsson				not played
5	(Norway) (Iceland)	Aimee Hong / Sofia Macsali; Juliana Karitas Johannsdottir / Karolina Prus				not played
