= 2019 BWF World Junior Championships – Girls' singles =

2019 BWF World Junior Championships Girls' Singles
Tournament details
- Dates: 7 – 13 October 2019
- Edition: 21st
- Level: International
- Venue: Kazan Gymnastics Center
- Location: Kazan, Russia

The girls' singles of the tournament 2019 BWF World Junior Championships held from 7 to 13 October 2019. Goh Jin Wei from Malaysia was the champion in the last edition.

== Seeds ==
Click on the seed number of a player to go to their draw section.

1. (Thailand) Phittayaporn Chaiwan (semifinals)
2. (China) Zhou Meng (final)
3. (Thailand) Benyapa Aimsaard (fourth round)
4. (Indonesia) Putri Kusuma Wardani (quarterfinals)
5. (China) Han Qianxi (fourth round)
6. (Hungary) Vivien Sandorhazi (fourth round)
7. (Japan) Riko Gunji (champion)
8. (Indonesia) Yasnita Enggira Setiawan (fourth round)

9. (Russia) Anastasiia Shapovalova (fourth round)
10. (Canada) Talia Ng (third round)
11. (China) Dai Wang (semifinals)
12. (Chinese Taipei) Hung En-tzu (quarterfinals)
13. (Thailand) Atitaya Povanon (third round)
14. (Indonesia) Stephanie Widjaja (quarterfinals)
15. (Belgium) Clara Lassaux (first round)
16. (Switzerland) Milena Schnider (first round)

== Draw ==
=== Finals ===
Quarterfinals
1	(Thailand) Phittayaporn Chaiwan	21	21
(Japan) Akari Kurihara	13	17
4	(Indonesia) Putri Kusuma Wardani	12	12
7	(Japan) Riko Gunji	21	21
11	(China) Dai Wang	21	21
12	(Chinese Taipei) Hung En-tzu	13	19
14	(Indonesia) Stephanie Widjaja	7	11
2	(China) Zhou Meng	21	21

Semifinals
1	(Thailand) Phittayaporn Chaiwan	16	19
7	(Japan) Riko Gunji	21	21
11	(China) Dai Wang	16	14
2	(China) Zhou Meng	21	21

Finals
7	(Japan) Riko Gunji	21	12	21
2	(China) Zhou Meng	13	21	14

=== Top half ===
==== Section 1 ====
First Round
(South Korea) Lee N-r	21	21
(United States) K Ngo	14	17
(Finland) J Salonen	19	17
(Czech Republic) K Mikelová	21	21
(India) U Bisht	21	21
(New Zealand) C Rozario	18	11
9	(Russia) A Shapovalova	21	21
(England) A Harris	17	8
(Sri Lanka) C Abeywickrama	21	21
(Iceland) J K Jóhannsdóttir	10	16
(Belarus) H Bandarenka	21	19	19
(Uzbekistan) G Bokieva	16	21	21
(Estonia) C Kruus	15	10
(Switzerland) D Pelupessy	21	21

Second Round
1	(Thailand) P Chaiwan	21	21
(South Korea) Lee N-r	13	13
(Czech Republic) K Mikelová	17	16
(India) U Bisht	21	21
9	(Russia) A Shapovalova	21	21
(Sri Lanka) C Abeywickrama	9	10
(Uzbekistan) G Bokieva	12	8
(Switzerland) D Pelupessy	21	21

Third Round
1	(Thailand) P Chaiwan	21	21
(India) U Bisht	12	7
9	(Russia) A Shapovalova	21	19	21
(Switzerland) D Pelupessy	19	21	18

Fourth Round
1	(Thailand) P Chaiwan	20	21	21
9	(Russia) A Shapovalova	22	14	15

==== Section 2 ====
First Round
5	(China) Han QX	21	21
(Slovakia) S Slosiarikova	7	6
(Malaysia) Letshanaa K	21	21
(Norway) E P Norberg	7	6
(Uganda) T Naluwooza	7	15
(Sweden) J Silvennoinen	21	21
(Portugal) C Lourenço	3	13
(Chinese Taipei) Tung C-t	21	21
10	(Canada) T Ng	21	21
(Australia) K Ea	15	13
(Hong Kong) Lui L L	21	21
(Hungary) P Meszaros	11	18
(Indonesia) A S Fatetani	21	21
(Latvia) D Stognija	6	8
(Mongolia) K Darkhanbaatar	5	1
(Japan) A Kurihara	21	21

Second Round
5	(China) Han QX	21	21
(Malaysia) Letshanaa K	14	8
(Sweden) J Silvennoinen	5	9
(Chinese Taipei) Tung C-t	21	21
10	(Canada) T Ng	21	15	21
(Hong Kong) Lui L L	7	21	13
(Indonesia) A S Fatetani	16	16
(Japan) A Kurihara	21	21

Third Round
5	(China) Han QX	21	21
(Chinese Taipei) Tung C-t	18	13
10	(Canada) T Ng	10	21	14
(Japan) A Kurihara	21	18	21

Fourth Round
5	(China) Han QX	11	11
(Japan) A Kurihara	21	21

==== Section 3 ====
First Round
(Scotland) R Cameron	12	10
(Malaysia) A Samin	21	21
(Kazakhstan) D Chotonova	5	13
(New Zealand) J Zhu	21	21
(Netherlands) A Tan	21	21
(Armenia) G Mamajanyan	6	10
13	(Thailand) A Povanon	21	21
(Peru) I Mendoza	13	9
(Chinese Taipei) Tsai H-p	21	21
(Sweden) C Wang	8	9
(Spain) L Solis	21	21
(Uganda) F M Rafi	8	17
(Australia) B Teoh	12	10
(India) A Bhatt	21	21

Second Round
4	(Indonesia) P K Wardani	21	21
(Malaysia) A Samin	13	13
(New Zealand) J Zhu	16	17
(Netherlands) A Tan	21	21
13	(Thailand) A Povanon	21	15	21
(Chinese Taipei) Tsai H-p	11	21	9
(Spain) L Solis	16	10
(India) A Bhatt	21	21

Third Round
4	(Indonesia) P K Wardani	21	21
(Netherlands) A Tan	12	7
13	(Thailand) A Povanon	21	14	20
(India) A Bhatt	14	21	22

Fourth Round
4	(Indonesia) P K Wardani	21	21
(India) A Bhatt	11	15

==== Section 4 ====
First Round
7	(Japan) R Gunji	21	21
(Hong Kong) S S Mehta	15	17
(Lithuania) S Golubickaite	23	15
(Norway) M Mørk	25	21
(Sri Lanka) P Adhikari	21	21
(Belarus) A Vasileuskaya	13	15
(Denmark) A Schulz	21	14	21
(United States) E Shi	17	21	10
15	(Belgium) C Lassaux	22	17
(Germany) L Michalski	24	21
(Macau) Pui C W	13	12
(China) Tan N	21	21
(Singapore) I Khan	16	21	11
(South Korea) Seo B-h	21	15	21
(Uzbekistan) K Ollaberganova	7	10
(Finland) J Kelavuori	21	21

Second Round
7	(Japan) R Gunji	21	21
(Norway) M Mørk	5	6
(Sri Lanka) P Adhikari	10	12
(Denmark) A Schulz	21	21
(Germany) L Michalski	9	9
(China) Tan N	21	21
(South Korea) Seo B-h	21	21
(Finland) J Kelavuori	3	8

Third Round
7	(Japan) R Gunji	21	21
(Denmark) A Schulz	15	12
(China) Tan N	21	21
(South Korea) Seo B-h	15	13

Fourth Round
7	(Japan) R Gunji	13	21	21
(China) Tan N	21	13	19

=== Bottom half ===
==== Section 5 ====
First Round
(Spain) L Rodriguez	21	21
(Macau) Wong C W	8	1
(Armenia) E Tiraturyan	7	1
(Sweden) E Urell	21	21
(Scotland) R Sugden	21	21
(Latvia) A Rulle-Titava	8	6
(Estonia) R Üprus	5	5
11	(China) Dai W	21	21
(Greece) G Sotiriou	21	21
(Uganda) H Kobugabe	13	9
(England) P Reyes	21	16	5
(Denmark) F Lund	14	21	21
(Malaysia) M M Khairul	21	20	21
(Russia) V Kozyreva	18	22	18
(Netherlands) M Versteeg	12	13
8	(Indonesia) Y E Setiawan	21	21

Second Round
(Spain) L Rodriguez	21	11	22
(Sweden) E Urell	17	21	20
(Scotland) R Sugden	15	18
11	(China) Dai W	21	21
(Greece) G Sotiriou	16	16
(Denmark) F Lund	21	21
(Malaysia) M M Khairul	14	16
8	(Indonesia) Y E Setiawan	21	21

Third Round
(Spain) L Rodriguez	8	9
11	(China) Dai W	21	21
(Denmark) F Lund	21	9	8
8	(Indonesia) Y E Setiawan	18	21	21'

Fourth Round
11	(China) Dai W	21	17	21
8	(Indonesia) Y E Setiawan	18	21	12

==== Section 6 ====
First Round
(Finland) T Vasikkaniemi	24	21
(Kazakhstan) V Li-Zhe-Yu	22	13
(Switzerland) J Franconville	14	4
(India) T Mir	21	21
(Singapore) M Lee	21	21
(Belarus) V Tarusava	11	13
(Iceland) K Prus	6	4
12	(Chinese Taipei) Hung E-t	21	21
(Canada) WY Zhang	21	21
(Japan) K Sugiyama	12	15
(Israel) D Danilenko	10	18
(South Korea) Choi H-w	21	21
(Portugal) A Fernandes	15	6
(Sri Lanka) D Dias	21	21

Second Round
(Finland) T Vasikkaniemi	4	8
(India) T Mir	21	21
(Singapore) M Lee	5	13
12	(Chinese Taipei) Hung E-t	21	21
(Canada) WY Zhang	21	21
(South Korea) Choi H-w	9	18
(Sri Lanka) D Dias	10	15
3	(Thailand) B Aimsaard	21	21

Third Round
(India) T Mir	13	19
12	(Chinese Taipei) Hung E-t	21	21
(Canada) WY Zhang	12	14
3	(Thailand) B Aimsaard	21	21

Fourth Round
12	(Chinese Taipei) Hung E-t	12	21	21
3	(Thailand) B Aimsaard	21	17	11

==== Section 7 ====
First Round
(Australia) A Yu	17	21	21
(Norway) S Macsali	21	18	5
(Canada) R Chan	23	21
(Germany) A-K Spöri	21	12
(Kazakhstan) D Moiseenko	7	13
(Singapore) Ong X Q	21	21
(Chinese Taipei) Huang C-p	21	14	7
14	(Indonesia) S Widjaja	17	21	21
(Moldova) E-A Diordiev	12	9
(India) T Hegde	21	21
(Malaysia) Tan Z Y	21	26
(South Korea) Kim A-l	19	24
(France) R Cloteaux-Foucault	21	21
(New Zealand) E Smith	6	12
(Peru) F Saponara	14	15
6	(Hungary) V Sandorhazi	21	21

Second Round
(Australia) A Yu	12	17
(Canada) R Chan	21	21
(Singapore) Ong X Q	12	10
14	(Indonesia) S Widjaja	21	21
(India) T Hegde	21	21
(Malaysia) Tan Z Y	13	12
(France) R Cloteaux-Foucault	13	14
6	(Hungary) V Sandorhazi	21	21

Third Round
(Canada) R Chan	21	18	12
14	(Indonesia) S Widjaja	19	21	21
(India) T Hegde	16	12
6	(Hungary) V Sandorhazi	21	21

Fourth Round
14	(Indonesia) S Widjaja	21	21
6	(Hungary) V Sandorhazi	12	16

==== Section 8 ====
First Round
(Czech Republic) K Zuzáková	21	21
(Iceland) L Bu	4	11
(Russia) M Golubeva	21	21
(Lithuania) G Mockute	7	6
(Japan) C Uchiyama	21	21
(Hong Kong) Cheng S Y	14	12
(Denmark) S Grundtvig	21	21
16	(Switzerland) M Schnider	13	11
(Spain) A Setien	21	21
(Uzbekistan) S Sodikova	15	13
(Latvia) A Kupča	18	18
(United States) M Ilango	21	21
(Mongolia) M Lkhagvasuren	8	4
(Portugal) M Afonso	21	21

Second Round
(Czech Republic) K Zuzáková	23	20
(Russia) M Golubeva	25	22
(Japan) C Uchiyama	21	16	21
(Denmark) S Grundtvig	13	21	8
(Spain) A Setien	21	11	21
(United States) M Ilango	15	21	18
(Portugal) M Afonso	8	6
2	(China) Zhou M	21	21

Third Round
(Russia) M Golubeva	13	13
(Japan) C Uchiyama	21	21
(Spain) A Setien	9	12
2	(China) Zhou M	21	21

Fourth Round
(Japan) C Uchiyama	18	15
2	(China) Zhou M	21	21
