= Badminton at the 2024 BRICS Games – Mixed doubles =

Badminton event

Men's doubles at the 2024 BRICS Games
- Venue: Kazan Gymnastics Center
- Dates: 14 – 16 June 2024

Medalists
gold medal	Gleb Stepakov; Alina Davletova	Russia
silver medal	Vladislav Dobychkin; Mariia Golubeva	Russia
bronze medal	Mikhail Makarav; Sofiya Yanouskaya	Belarus
bronze medal	Pavel Monich; Daria Kharlampovich	Russia

The mixed doubles badminton tournament at the 2024 BRICS Games took place from 14 to 16 June 2024 at the Kazan Gymnastics Center at Kazan.

Gleb Stepakov and Alina Davletova emerged as champions in the mixed doubles event after defeating compatriots Vladislav Dobychkin and Mariia Golubeva in the final.

== Competition format ==
Similar to the Olympics, the tournament started with a group phase round-robin followed by a knockout stage. There were three groups of three teams each; the top two highest-ranked pairs from each group advanced to the knockout stage.

Matches were played best-of-three games. Each game was played to 21, except that a team must win by 2 unless the score reaches 30–29.

== Schedule ==
The tournament was held over a 3-day period.

Legend

P	Preliminaries	QF	Quarter-finals	SF	Semi-finals	M	Medal matches

Date	14 Jun	15 Jun		16 Jun
Mixed doubles	P	QF	SF	M

== Group stage ==
The group stage was played on 14 June. The winner and runner-up of each group advanced to the knockout rounds.

=== Group 1 ===
Pos	Team	Pld	W	L	GF	GA	GD	PF	PA	PD	Pts	Qualification
1	Gleb Stepakov (RUS) Alina Davletova (RUS) (H)	2	2	0	4	0	+4	84	18	+66	2	Advance to semi-finals
2	Hussam Aldin Rae (SYR) Ranim Alhasbani (SYR)	2	1	1	2	2	0	51	63	−12	1	Advance to quarter-finals
3	Aboul Fatao Tapsoba (BUR) Rachidatou Bilogo (BUR)	2	0	2	0	4	−4	30	84	−54	0	

Source: Yandex
(H) Host

Date	Time	Player 1	Score	Player 2	Set 1	Set 2	Set 3
14 June	10:00	Hussam Aldin Rae (Syria); Ranim Alhasbani (Syria)	2–0	(Burkina Faso) Aboul Fatao Tapsoba (Burkina Faso) Rachidatou Bilogo	21–8	21–13	
14 June	11:00	Gleb Stepakov (Russia); Alina Davletova (Russia)	2–0	(Burkina Faso) Aboul Fatao Tapsoba (Burkina Faso) Rachidatou Bilogo	21–3	21–6	
14 June	12:00	Gleb Stepakov (Russia); Alina Davletova (Russia)	2–0	(Syria) Hussam Aldin Rae (Syria) Ranim Alhasbani	21–4	21–5	

=== Group 2 ===
Pos	Team	Pld	W	L	GF	GA	GD	PF	PA	PD	Pts	Qualification
1	Pavel Monich (RUS) Daria Kharlampovich (RUS) (H)	2	2	0	4	0	+4	84	33	+51	2	Advance to semi-finals
2	Welton Menezes (BRA) Sayane Regina Lima (BRA)	2	1	1	2	2	0	65	68	−3	1	Advance to quarter-finals
3	Shadi Alasari (SYR) Fulla Alnajjar (SYR)	2	0	2	0	4	−4	36	84	−48	0	

Source: Yandex
(H) Host

Date	Time	Player 1	Score	Player 2	Set 1	Set 2	Set 3
14 June	10:20	Welton Menezes (Brazil); Sayane Regina Lima (Brazil)	2–0	(Syria) Shadi Alasari (Syria) Fulla Alnajjar	21–14	21–12	
14 June	11:20	Pavel Monich (Russia); Daria Kharlampovich (Russia)	2–0	(Syria) Shadi Alasari (Syria) Fulla Alnajjar	21–4	21–6	
14 June	12:20	Pavel Monich (Russia); Daria Kharlampovich (Russia)	2–0	(Brazil) Welton Menezes (Brazil) Sayane Regina Lima	21–12	21–11	

=== Group 3 ===
Pos	Team	Pld	W	L	GF	GA	GD	PF	PA	PD	Pts	Qualification
1	Vladislav Dobychkin (RUS) Mariia Golubeva (RUS) (H)	2	2	0	4	0	+4	84	46	+38	2	Advance to quarter-finals
2	Mikhail Makarav (BLR) Sofiya Yanouskaya (BLR)	2	1	1	2	2	0	70	74	−4	1	Advance to quarter-finals
3	Pedro Taveira (BRA) Julia Viana Vieira (BRA)	2	0	2	0	4	−4	50	84	−34	0	

Source: Yandex
(H) Host

Date	Time	Player 1	Score	Player 2	Set 1	Set 2	Set 3
14 June	10:40	Vladislav Dobychkin (Russia); Mariia Golubeva (Russia)	2–0	(Brazil) Pedro Taveira (Brazil) Julia Viana Vieira	21–10	21–8	
14 June	11:40	Mikhail Makarav (Belarus); Sofiya Yanouskaya (Belarus)	2–0	(Brazil) Pedro Taveira (Brazil) Julia Viana Vieira	21–13	21–19	
14 June	12:40	Vladislav Dobychkin (Russia); Mariia Golubeva (Russia)	2–0	(Belarus) Mikhail Makarav (Belarus) Sofiya Yanouskaya	21–10	21–18	

== Finals ==
The knockout stage was played from 15 to 16 June.

Quarter-finals
Mikhail Makarav (BLR); Sofiya Yanouskaya (BLR)	21	19	21
Welton Menezes (BRA); Sayane Regina Lima (BRA)	9	21	17
Hussam Aldin Rae (SYR); Ranim Alhasbani (SYR)	2	3
Vladislav Dobychkin (RUS); Mariia Golubeva (RUS)	21	21

Semi-finals
Gleb Stepakov (RUS); Alina Davletova (RUS)	21	21
Mikhail Makarav (BLR); Sofiya Yanouskaya (BLR)	8	9
Vladislav Dobychkin (RUS); Mariia Golubeva (RUS)	19	21	21
Pavel Monich (RUS); Daria Kharlampovich (RUS)	21	16	18

Gold medal match
Gleb Stepakov (RUS); Alina Davletova (RUS)	21	21
Vladislav Dobychkin (RUS); Mariia Golubeva (RUS)	13	18
