= Badminton at the 2024 BRICS Games – Men's doubles =

Badminton event

Men's doubles at the 2024 BRICS Games
- Venue: Kazan Gymnastics Center
- Dates: 13 – 16 June 2024

Medalists
gold medal	Artur Pechenkin; Gleb Stepakov	Russia
silver medal	Pavel Monich; Sergey Sirant	Russia
bronze medal	Hussam Aldin Rae; Shadi Alansari	Syria
bronze medal	Mikhail Makarav; Hleb Shvydkov	Belarus

The men's doubles badminton tournament at the 2024 BRICS Games took place from 13 to 16 June 2024 at the Kazan Gymnastics Center at Kazan.

Artur Pechenkin and Gleb Stepakov emerged as champions in the men's doubles event after defeating compatriots Pavel Monich and Sergey Sirant in the final.

== Competition format ==
Similar to the Olympics, the tournament started with a group phase round-robin followed by a knockout stage. There were three groups of between three and four teams each; the top two highest-ranked pairs from each group advanced to the knockout stage.

Matches were played best-of-three games. Each game was played to 21, except that a team must win by 2 unless the score reaches 30–29.

== Schedule ==
The tournament was held over a 4-day period.

Legend

P	Preliminaries	QF	Quarter-finals	SF	Semi-finals	M	Medal matches

Date	13 Jun	14 Jun	15 Jun	16 Jun
Men's doubles	P	QF	SF	M

== Group stage ==
The group stage was played on 13 June. The winner and runner-up of each group advanced to the knockout rounds.

=== Group 1 ===
Pos	Team	Pld	W	L	GF	GA	GD	PF	PA	PD	Pts	Qualification
1	Artur Pechenkin (RUS) Gleb Stepakov (RUS) (H)	2	2	0	4	0	+4	84	27	+57	2	Advance to semi-finals
2	Welton Menezes (BRA) Pedro Taveira (BRA)	2	1	1	2	2	0	59	57	+2	1	Advance to quarter-finals
3	Elham Akbari (AFG) Mohammad Ibrahim Jamshidi (AFG)	2	0	2	0	4	−4	25	84	−59	0	

Source: Yandex
(H) Host

Date	Time	Player 1	Score	Player 2	Set 1	Set 2	Set 3
13 June	15:30	Welton Menezes (Brazil); Pedro Taveira (Brazil)	2–0	Elham Akbari; Mohammad Ibrahim Jamshidi	21–4	21–11	
13 June	16:30	Artur Pechenkin (Russia); Gleb Stepakov (Russia)	2–0	Elham Akbari; Mohammad Ibrahim Jamshidi	21–6	21–4	
13 June	17:30	Artur Pechenkin (Russia); Gleb Stepakov (Russia)	2–0	(Brazil) Welton Menezes (Brazil) Pedro Taveira	21–9	21–8	

=== Group 2 ===
Pos	Team	Pld	W	L	GF	GA	GD	PF	PA	PD	Pts	Qualification
1	Pavel Monich (RUS) Sergey Sirant (RUS) (H)	3	3	0	6	0	+6	126	27	+99	3	Advance to semi-finals
2	Ali Kaboré (BUR) Aboul Fatao Tapsoba (BUR)	3	2	1	4	3	+1	116	132	−16	2	Advance to quarter-finals
3	Mohammad Sadiq Barakzai (AFG) Irshadullhaq Sadiqi (AFG)	3	1	2	3	4	−1	100	128	−28	1	
4	Traoré Souleymane (MLI) Boubacar Traoré (MLI)	3	0	3	0	6	−6	73	128	−55	0	

Source: Yandex
(H) Host

Date	Time	Player 1	Score	Player 2	Set 1	Set 2	Set 3
13 June	15:00	Pavel Monich (Russia); Sergey Sirant (Russia)	2–0	(Burkina Faso) Ali Kaboré (Burkina Faso) Aboul Fatao Tapsoba	21–8	21–4	
13 June	15:00	Pavel Monich (Russia); Sergey Sirant (Russia)	2–0	(Mali) Traoré Souleymane (Mali) Boubacar Traoré	21–4	21–3	
13 June	15:00	Ali Kaboré (Burkina Faso); Aboul Fatao Tapsoba (Burkina Faso)	2–1	Mohammad Sadiq Barakzai; Irshadullhaq Sadiqi	21–17	18–21	21–12
13 June	16:00	Mohammad Sadiq Barakzai; Irshadullhaq Sadiqi	2–0	(Mali) Traoré Souleymane (Mali) Boubacar Traoré	21–11	21–15	
13 June	17:00	Pavel Monich (Russia); Sergey Sirant (Russia)	2–0	Mohammad Sadiq Barakzai; Irshadullhaq Sadiqi	21–7	21–1	
13 June	17:00	Ali Kaboré (Burkina Faso); Aboul Fatao Tapsoba (Burkina Faso)	2–0	(Mali) Traoré Souleymane (Mali) Boubacar Traoré	23–21	21–19	

=== Group 3 ===
Pos	Team	Pld	W	L	GF	GA	GD	PF	PA	PD	Pts	Qualification
1	Mikhail Makarav (BLR) Hleb Shvydkov (BLR)	3	3	0	6	0	+6	126	27	+99	3	Advance to quarter-finals
2	Hussam Aldin Rae (SYR) Shadi Alansari (SYR)	3	2	1	4	3	+1	116	132	−16	2	Advance to quarter-finals
3	Ismail Jahid (AFG) Inamulhaq Sadiqi (AFG)	3	1	2	3	4	−1	100	128	−28	1	
4	Alfousseini Hasseye Assarki (MLI) Massiré Savane (MLI)	3	0	3	0	6	−6	73	128	−55	0	

Source: Yandex

Date	Time	Player 1	Score	Player 2	Set 1	Set 2	Set 3
13 June	15:00	Ismail Jahid; Inamulhaq Sadiqi	2–0	(Mali) Alfousseini Hasseye Assarki (Mali) Massiré Savane	21–12	25–23	
13 June	15:00	Mikhail Makarav (Belarus); Hleb Shvydkov (Belarus)	2–0	(Syria) Hussam Aldin Rae (Syria) Shadi Alansari	21–4	21–11	
13 June	16:00	Mikhail Makarav (Belarus); Hleb Shvydkov (Belarus)	2–0	(Mali) Alfousseini Hasseye Assarki (Mali) Massiré Savane	21–7	21–7	
13 June	16:00	Hussam Aldin Rae (Syria); Shadi Alansari (Syria)	2–0	Ismail Jahid; Inamulhaq Sadiqi	21–13	21–12	
13 June	17:00	Hussam Aldin Rae (Syria); Shadi Alansari (Syria)	2–0	(Mali) Alfousseini Hasseye Assarki (Mali) Massiré Savane	21–14	21–7	
13 June	17:00	Mikhail Makarav (Belarus); Hleb Shvydkov (Belarus)	2–0	Ismail Jahid; Inamulhaq Sadiqi	21–10	21–9	

== Finals ==
The knockout stage was played from 14 to 16 June.

Quarter-finals
Hussam Aldin Rae (SYR); Shadi Alansari (SYR)	21	21
Ali Kaboré (BUR); Aboul Fatao Tapsoba (BUR)	14	9
Welton Menezes (BRA); Pedro Taveira (BRA)	14	17
Mikhail Makarav (BLR); Hleb Shvydkov (BLR)	21	21

Semi-finals
Artur Pechenkin (RUS); Gleb Stepakov (RUS)	21	21
Hussam Aldin Rae (SYR); Shadi Alansari (SYR)	6	7
Mikhail Makarav (BLR); Hleb Shvydkov (BLR)	13	8
Pavel Monich (RUS); Sergey Sirant (RUS)	21	21

Gold medal match
Artur Pechenkin (RUS); Gleb Stepakov (RUS)	21	21
Pavel Monich (RUS); Sergey Sirant (RUS)	15	7
