= Riko Gunji =

Japanese badminton player (born 2002)

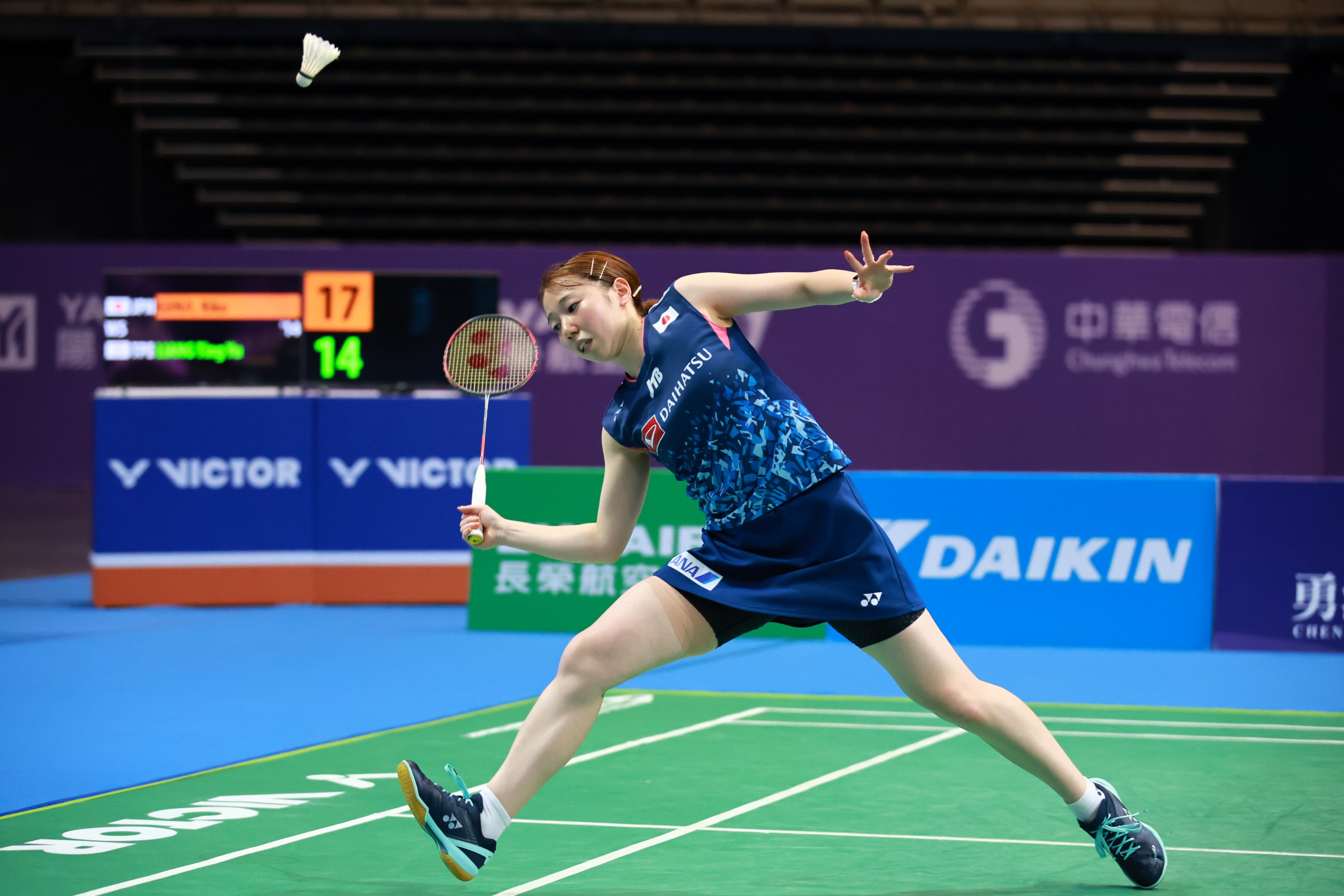
- Gunji at the 2023 Kaohsiung Masters

Personal information
- Native name: 郡司 莉子
- Born: 31 July 2002 (age 24) Ebina, Kanagawa, Japan
- Height: 1.60 m (5 ft 3 in)

Sport
- Country: Japan
- Sport: Badminton
- Handedness: Right
- Coached by: Takako Ida; Tatsuya Watanabe

Women's singles
- Career record: 202 wins, 64 losses (75.94%)
- Highest ranking: 18 (2 June 2026)
- Current ranking: 19 (10 November 2026)
- BWF profile
Medal record
Women's badminton
Representing Japan
Uber Cup
Bronze medal – third place	2022 Bangkok	Women's team
Bronze medal – third place	2026 Horsens	Women's team
Asian Games
Silver medal – second place	2026 Aichi–Nagoya	Women's team
Asia Team Championships
Gold medal – first place	2020 Manila	Women's team
Bronze medal – third place	2022 Selangor	Women's team
World Junior Championships
Gold medal – first place	2019 Kazan	Girls' singles
Bronze medal – third place	2018 Markham	Mixed team
Bronze medal – third place	2019 Kazan	Mixed team
Asian Junior Championships
Silver medal – second place	2018 Jakarta	Mixed team

Riko Gunji (郡司 莉子, Gunji Riko; born 31 July 2002) is a Japanese badminton player who competes in women's singles. A member of the Japanese national team, she plays for the Kumamoto Saishunkan team and has reached a career-high world ranking of No. 18. She is the gold medalist at the 2019 BWF World Junior Championships in the girls' singles. She secured her maiden BWF World Tour title at the 2024 Indonesia Masters Super 100 and won her first Super 300 title at the 2026 Canada Open. In team competitions, she was a member of the Japanese squad that won gold at the 2020 Asia Team Championships and earned bronze medals at the 2022 and 2026 Uber Cup.

== Career ==
Gunji was the finalist in the Under-15 at the 2016 Singapore Youth International Series. In the same tournament, she won the girls' doubles title with partner Akari Nakashizu. She was the girls' singles Under-17 champion of 2017 Singapore Youth International Series beating Peeraya Khantaruangsakul of Thailand. She won the bronze medal in 2018 BWF World Junior Championships mixed team event. In the girls' singles, she lost in the second round to China's Wang Zhiyi.

In 2019, she reached the final of Dutch Junior International where she earned second best position after losing to China's Han Qianxi. She lost another final at the India Junior International event to Thai player Benyapa Aimsaard. In 2019 World Junior Championships, she entered the tournament seeded 7th. She went on to stun several higher seeded players in the tournament. She defeated Thailand's Phittayaporn Chaiwan in semifinal, who was a top seeded player in 2 straight games. In the final she won the World Junior title, beating out China's Zhou Meng.

=== 2020–2022 ===
Moving to senior competition, Gunji was part of the Japanese women's team that won gold at the 2020 Asia Team Championships. In 2021, she secured her first senior international title at the Belgian International. The 2022 season saw Gunji win three more International Challenge titles at the Mexican International, Réunion Open, and Irish Open, while finishing as runner-up at the Indonesia International and Norwegian International. She also reached her first BWF World Tour final at the 2022 Indonesia Masters Super 100, finishing in second place. In team events, she contributed to Japan's bronze medals at both the 2022 Asia Team Championships and the Uber Cup.

=== 2023 ===
Gunji began the 2023 season by reaching the second round of the Thailand Masters. She then competed in Europe, exiting in the first round of the German Open by then-world No. 2 An Se-young and advanced to the second round of the Swiss Open. At the Spain Masters, she retired from her opening match after sustaining a right hamstring muscle tear. This injury required a six-month break, causing her world ranking to fall from the 30s to over 100. She returned to competition in September, reaching the quarterfinals of the Super 100 Indonesia Masters and finishing as the runner-up at the Super 100 Kaohsiung Masters. In late October, Gunji suffered a second injury: a sprained right ankle with partial tears to two ligaments.

=== 2024–2025 ===
In 2024, Gunji won her first BWF World Tour title at the Indonesia Masters Super 100, defeating compatriot Hina Akechi in the final. On the International Challenge circuit, she won four titles: the Thailand International, Denmark Challenge, Saipan International, and Malaysia International. Additionally, she was the runner-up at the Luxembourg Open.

In 2025, Gunji began competing in higher-tier World Tour events. She reached the semifinals of the German Open, followed by quarterfinal finishes at the Orléans Masters and the Taipei Open. In July, she reached her first Super 750 semifinal at the Japan Open, defeating fourth seed Han Yue in the quarterfinals before losing to world No. 1 An Se-young. Later that year, Gunji made her Super 1000 debut at the China Open, where she was eliminated in the second round by eventual champion Wang Zhiyi.

=== 2026 ===
Gunji began her 2026 season in January with first-round exits at two consecutive tournaments, the Malaysia Open and the India Open. In February, she represented Japan at the Asia Team Championships, where the women's team finished fifth. During the European tour in March, Gunji advanced to the second round of the All England Open and reached the quarterfinals of both the Swiss Open and the Orléans Masters. Making her debut at the Asian Championships in April, she defeated Kim Ga-eun in the second round before falling to Wang Zhiyi in the quarterfinals. In May, Gunji contributed to Japan's bronze medal finish at the Uber Cup in Horsens. In July, Gunji won her first Super 300 title at the Canada Open. She defeated home favorite Michelle Li in the semifinals before overcoming Denmark's Line Christophersen in the final. She made her World Championships debut in August, where she was eliminated in the first round.

== Achievements ==
=== World Junior Championships ===
Girls' singles
Year	Venue	Opponent	Score	Result	Ref.
2019	Kazan Gymnastics Center; Kazan, Russia	(China) Zhou Meng	21–13, 12–21, 21–14	Gold	

=== BWF World Tour (2 titles, 2 runners-up) ===
The BWF World Tour, which was announced on 19 March 2017 and implemented in 2018, is a series of elite badminton tournaments sanctioned by the Badminton World Federation (BWF). The BWF World Tour is divided into levels of World Tour Finals, Super 1000, Super 750, Super 500, Super 300 (part of the HSBC World Tour), and the BWF Tour Super 100.

Women's singles
Year	Tournament	Level	Opponent	Score	Result	Ref.
2022	Indonesia Masters	Super 100	(China) Gao Fangjie	10–21, 12–21	(silver) Runner-up	
2023	Kaohsiung Masters	Super 100	(Chinese Taipei) Liang Ting-yu	20–22, 21–15, 14–21	(silver) Runner-up	
2024 (I)	Indonesia Masters	Super 100	(Japan) Hina Akechi	21–10, 22–20	(gold) Winner	
2026	Canada Open	Super 300	(Denmark) Line Christophersen	21–15, 15–21, 21–6	(gold) Winner	

=== BWF International Challenge/Series (8 titles, 3 runners-up) ===
Women's singles
Year	Tournament	Opponent	Score	Result	Ref.
2021	Belgian International	(Chinese Taipei) Hsu Wen-chi	12–21, 21–16, 23–21	(gold) Winner	
2022	Mexican International	(Japan) Natsuki Nidaira	21–14, 19–21, 21–14	(gold) Winner	
2022	Réunion Open	(Japan) Natsuki Oie	21–5, 21–14	(gold) Winner	
2022 (II)	Indonesia International	(China) Gao Fangjie	9–21, 11–21	(silver) Runner-up	
2022	Norwegian International	(Japan) Natsuki Nidaira	21–14, 18–21, 16–21	(silver) Runner-up	
2022	Irish Open	(Japan) Natsuki Nidaira	21–13, 21–11	(gold) Winner	
2024	Thailand International	(Indonesia) Mutiara Ayu Puspitasari	21–14, 21–15	(gold) Winner	
2024	Luxembourg Open	(Japan) Hina Akechi	16–21, 14–21	(silver) Runner-up	
2024	Denmark Challenge	(Japan) Hina Akechi	20–22, 21–16, 21–11	(gold) Winner	
2024	Saipan International	(Japan) Asuka Takahashi	21–14, 14–21, 21–16	(gold) Winner	
2024	Malaysia International	(Indonesia) Ruzana	19–21, 21–15, 21–11	(gold) Winner	

BWF International Challenge tournament
BWF International Series tournament

=== BWF Junior International (2 runners-up) ===
Girls' singles
Year	Tournament	Opponent	Score	Result	Ref.
2019	Dutch Junior International	(China) Han Qianxi	13–21, 21–23	(silver) Runner-up	
2019	India Junior International	(Thailand) Benyapa Aimsaard	19–21, 21–18, 21–23	(silver) Runner-up	

BWF Junior International Grand Prix tournament

== Performance timeline ==
Key

W	Won	F	Finalist	SF	Semi-finalist
QF	Quarter-finalist	#R	Rounds 4, 3, 2, 1	RR	Round-robin stage
Q#	Qualification round	A	Absent	w/d	Withdrew
G	Gold	S	Silver	B	Bronze
NH	Not held	N/A	Not applicable	DNQ	Did not qualify

=== National team ===
- Junior level

Team events	2018	2019	Ref
Asian Junior Championships	S	QF	
World Junior Championships	B	B	

- Senior level

Team events	2020	2021	2022	2023	2024	2025	2026	Ref
Asia Team Championships	G	NH	B	NH	A	NH	5th	
Asian Games	NH		A	NH			S	
Uber Cup	NH	A	B	NH	A	NH	B	

=== Individual competitions ===
- Junior level

Events	2018	2019	Ref
Asian Junior Championships	1R	A	
World Junior Championships	4R	G	

- Senior level

Event	2026	Ref
Asian Championships	QF	
World Championships	1R	

Tournament	BWF World Tour					Best	Ref
Tournament	2022	2023	2024	2025	2026	Best	Ref
Malaysia Open	A				1R	1R ('26)	
India Open	A				1R	1R ('26)	
Thailand Masters	NH	2R	A			2R ('23)	
German Open	A	1R	A	SF	A	SF ('25)	
All England Open	A				2R	2R ('26)	
Swiss Open	A	1R	A		QF	QF ('26)	
Ruichang China Masters	NH	A	1R	A		1R ('24)	
Orléans Masters	A			QF	QF	QF ('25, '26)	
Thailand Open	A			2R	2R	2R ('25, '26)	
Singapore Open	A				2R	2R ('26)	
Indonesia Open	A				1R	1R ('26)	
Macau Open	NH		QF	SF	A	SF ('25)	
U.S. Open	NH	A			QF	QF ('26)	
Canada Open	QF	A			W	W ('26)	
Japan Open	A			SF	1R	SF ('25)	
China Open	NH	A		2R	2R	2R ('25, '26)	
Taipei Open	A			QF	A	QF ('25)	
China Masters	NH	A		1R	1R	1R ('25, '26)	
Indonesia Masters Super 100	F	QF	W	A		W ('24)	
Indonesia Masters Super 100	F	w/d	A	A		W ('24)	
Vietnam Open	A	1R	A			1R ('23)	
Arctic Open	NH	A		2R	2R	2R ('25, '26)	
Denmark Open	A			1R	2R	2R ('26)	
French Open	A			2R	2R	2R ('25, '26)	
Korea Open	A				QF	QF ('26)	
Japan Masters	NH		2R	w/d	QF	QF ('26)	
Kaohsiung Masters	N/A	F	A			F ('23)	
Hong Kong Open	NH	A		2R	A	2R ('25)	
Syed Modi International	A				Q	('26)	
Spain Masters	NH	1R	A	NH		1R ('23)	
Year-end ranking	42	103	39	27		27	
Tournament	2022	2023	2024	2025	2026	Best	Ref

== Wins over top-10 ranked players ==
Wins over players who were ranked in the world's top 10 at the time the match was played.

#	Opponent	Rk	Tournament	Rd	Score	Rk	Ref.
1	(Thailand) Ratchanok Intanon	8	2023 Swiss Open	1R	21–15 retired	36	
2	(Indonesia) Gregoria Mariska Tunjung	8	2025 Japan Open	1R	21–10, 21–12	32	
3	(China) Han Yue	4	2025 Japan Open	QF	21–17, 21–10	32	
4	(China) Han Yue	5	2026 All England Open	1R	20–22, 21–17, 21–18	26	
5	(Indonesia) Putri Kusuma Wardani	9	2026 Japan Masters	1R	21–13, 22–20	19	

== Record against selected opponents ==
Record against Year-end Finals finalists, World Championships semi-finalists, and Olympic quarter-finalists. Accurate as of 15 November 2026.

Player	M	W	L	Diff.
(China) Han Yue	3	2	1	+1
(China) Wang Zhiyi	3	0	3	–3
(India) P. V. Sindhu	3	0	3	–3
(Indonesia) Gregoria Mariska Tunjung	1	1	0	+1
(Indonesia) Putri Kusuma Wardani	5	4	1	+3
(Japan) Aya Ohori	1	0	1	–1

Player	M	W	L	Diff.
(Japan) Nozomi Okuhara	1	0	1	–1
(Japan) Akane Yamaguchi	3	0	3	–3
(South Korea) An Se-young	3	0	3	–3
(Thailand) Pornpawee Chochuwong	1	0	1	–1
(Thailand) Ratchanok Intanon	2	1	1	0
