= Aisyah Sativa Fatetani =

Indonesian badminton player (born 2002)

Personal information
- Born: 14 May 2002 (age 24) Banyumas, Central Java, Indonesia

Sport
- Country: Indonesia
- Sport: Badminton
- Handedness: Right

Women's singles
- Highest ranking: 109 (3 October 2023)
- Current ranking: 161 (18 June 2024)
- BWF profile

Aisyah Sativa Fatetani (born 14 May 2002) is an Indonesian badminton player.

== Career ==
In 2021, she won her first title at the Bahrain International defeating fellow Indonesian Komang Ayu Cahya Dewi.

In 2022, she won her second title at the Lithuanian International defeating fellow Indonesian Saifi Rizka Nurhidayah.

In 2023, she competed at the Indonesia Masters Super 100 I but lost in the final qualifications from fellow Indonesian Deswanti Hujansih Nurtertiati.

== Achievements ==
=== BWF International Challenge/Series (2 titles) ===
Women's singles
| Year | Tournament | Opponent | Score | Result | Ref. |
|---|---|---|---|---|---|
| 2021 | Bahrain International | (Indonesia) Komang Ayu Cahya Dewi | 14–21, 21–14, 21–19 | (gold) Winner | |
| 2022 | Lithuanian International | (Indonesia) Saifi Rizka Nurhidayah | 21–16, 19–21, 24–22 | (gold) Winner | |

BWF International Challenge tournament
BWF International Series tournament
BWF Future Series tournament

=== BWF Junior International (1 runner-up) ===
Girls' singles
| Year | Tournament | Opponent | Score | Result |
|---|---|---|---|---|
| 2019 | Malaysia Junior International | (China) Tan Ning | 21–17, 19–21, 8–21 | (silver) Runner-up |

BWF Junior International Grand Prix tournament
BWF Junior International Challenge tournament
BWF Junior International Series tournament
BWF Junior Future Series tournament

== Performance timeline ==
Key

| W | Won | F | Finalist | SF | Semi-finalist |
| QF | Quarter-finalist | #R | Rounds 4, 3, 2, 1 | RR | Round-robin stage |
| Q# | Qualification round | A | Absent | w/d | Withdrew |
| G | Gold | S | Silver | B | Bronze |
| NH | Not held | N/A | Not applicable | DNQ | Did not qualify |

=== National team ===
- Senior level

| Team events | 2022 |
|---|---|
| Uber Cup | QF |

=== Individual competitions ===
==== Junior level ====
- Girls' singles

| Event | 2019 |
|---|---|
| World Junior Championships | 2R |

==== Senior level ====
- Women's singles

| Tournament | BWF World Tour | | | | Best | Ref |
| Tournament | 2022 | 2023 | 2024 | 2025 | Best | Ref |
|---|---|---|---|---|---|---|
| Vietnam Open | A | 2R | 1R | Q2 | 2R ('23) | |
| Indonesia Masters Super 100 | 1R | Q2 | 2R | Q1 | 2R ('23 II, '24 I) | |
| Indonesia Masters Super 100 | 1R | 2R | 1R | 1R | 2R ('23 II, '24 I) | |
| Kaohsiung Masters | NA | A | 1R | A | 1R ('24) | |
| Malaysia Super 100 | NA | 1R | 1R | A | 1R ('23, '24) | |
| Year-end ranking | 132 | 135 | 150 | 162 | 109 | |
| Tournament | 2022 | 2023 | 2024 | 2025 | Best | Ref |
