= 2019 Badminton Asia Junior Championships – Girls' singles =

Tournament details
- Dates: 24 – 28 July 2019
- Edition: 22
- Venue: Suzhou Olympic Sports Centre
- Location: Suzhou, China

The girls' singles tournament of the 2019 Badminton Asia Junior Championships will be held from 24 to 28 July. Wang Zhiyi from China clinched this title in the last edition.

== Seeds ==
Seeds were announced on 2 July.

1. (Thailand) Phittayaporn Chaiwan (second round)
2. (China) Zhou Meng (champion)
3. (Indonesia) Putri Kusuma Wardani (quarterfinals)
4. (China) Han Qianxi (final)
5. (Thailand) Benyapa Aimsaard (semifinals)
6. (South Korea) Lee So-yul (third round)
7. (Indonesia) Yasnita Enggira Setiawan (second round)
8. (Indonesia) Stephanie Widjaja (second round)

== Draw ==
=== Finals ===
Quarterfinals
(China) Tan Ning	21	21
(South Korea) Kim Ga-lam	17	12
4	(China) Han Qianxi	21	21
(China) Wu Luoyu	14	19
5	(Thailand) Benyapa Aimsaard	21	21
3	(Indonesia) Putri Kusuma Wardani	16	14
(China) Dai Wang	18	14
2	(China) Zhou Meng	21	21

Semifinals
(China) Tan Ning	21	18	10
4	(China) Han Qianxi	11	21	21
5	(Thailand) Benyapa Aimsaard	10	18
2	(China) Zhou Meng	21	21

Final
4	(China) Han Qianxi	12	9
2	(China) Zhou Meng	21	21

=== Top half ===
==== Section 1 ====
First round
(Vietnam) Vũ T A T	11	21	19
(India) M Bansod	21	19	21
(China) Tan N	21	21
(Macau) Pui C W	6	6
(Malaysia) M K Myisha	13	15
(South Korea) Kim G-l	21	21
(Singapore) I Khan	21	21
(Mongolia) K Darkhanbaatar	7	2

Second round
1	(Thailand) P Chaiwan	18	19
(India) M Bansod	21	21
(Chinese Taipei) Tung C-t	13	10
(China) Tan N	21	21
8	(Indonesia) S Widjaja	19	22	15
(South Korea) Kim G-l	21	20	21
(Hong Kong) Cheng S Y	21	21
(Singapore) I Khan	11	15

Third round
(India) M Bansod	14	8
(China) Tan N	21	21
(South Korea) Kim G-l	10	21	21
(Hong Kong) Cheng S Y	21	18	17

Quarterfinals
(China) Tan N	21	21
(South Korea) Kim G-l	17	12

==== Section 2 ====
First round
(India) A Bhatt	21	23
(South Korea) Choi H-j	17	21
(Hong Kong) Lui L L	21	16	17
(Sri Lanka) D Dias	18	21	21
(Chinese Taipei) Huang C-p	10	21
(China) Wu LY	21	23
(Thailand) A Povanon	21	21
(Singapore) Ong X Q	11	10
(Vietnam) Nguyễn T N L	21	21
(Nepal) S Rajbanshi	9	12

Second round
4	(China) Han QX	21	21
(India) A Bhatt	13	15
(Malaysia) L Karupathevan	14	21	21
(Sri Lanka) D Dias	21	13	17
7	(Indonesia) Y E Setiawan	18	11
(China) Wu LY	21	21
(Thailand) A Povanon	21	21
(Vietnam) Nguyễn T N L	7	4

Third round
4	(China) Han QX	21	21
(Malaysia) L Karupathevan	12	18
(China) Wu LY	19	21	21
(Thailand) A Povanon	21	13	12

Quarterfinals
4	(China) Han QX	21	21
(China) Wu LY	14	19

=== Bottom half ===
==== Section 3 ====
First round
(Malaysia) I Liau B Y	12	13
(India) U Bisht	21	21
(Hong Kong) Ng T Y	21	21
(Nepal) J Gurung	9	8
(Singapore) M Lee	22	20	21
(Vietnam) Thân V A	20	22	17
(Chinese Taipei) Hung E-t	21	21
(Mongolia) M Lkhagvasuren	2	4
(South Korea) Chung D-j	21	21
(Sri Lanka) Y Kuruppu	2	6

Second round
(India) U Bisht	21	21
(Hong Kong) Ng T Y	6	10
(Singapore) M Lee	8	16
5	(Thailand) B Aimsaard	21	21
(Chinese Taipei) Hung E-t	21	12	21
(China) Wu YQ	16	21	15
(South Korea) Chung D-j	14	17
3	(Indonesia) P K Wardani	21	21

Third round
(India) U Bisht	8	13
5	(Thailand) B Aimsaard	21	21
(Chinese Taipei) Hung E-t	15	16
3	(Indonesia) P K Wardani	21	21

Quarterfinals
5	(Thailand) B Aimsaard	21	21
3	(Indonesia) P K Wardani	16	14

==== Section 4 ====
First round
(Iran) N Safaei	8	10
(China) Dai W	21	21
(Singapore) Chiu J Y	10	7
(Thailand) P Choeikeewong	21	21
(Indonesia) A G Maheswari	21	21
(Hong Kong) S S Mehta	19	5
(India) A Rawat	21	21
(Chinese Taipei) Yeo Y-c	13	10

Second round
(China) Dai W	21	21
(Malaysia) Tan Z Y	15	6
(Thailand) P Choeikeewong	9	7
6	(South Korea) Lee S-y	21	21
(Indonesia) A G Maheswari	21	21
(Macau) Wong C W	6	9
(India) A Rawat	10	14
2	(China) Zhou M	21	21

Third round
(China) Dai W	21	21
6	(South Korea) Lee S-y	14	13
(Indonesia) A G Maheswari	17	21	10
2	(China) Zhou M	21	16	21

Quarterfinals
(China) Dai W	18	14
2	(China) Zhou M	21	21
