= Han Qianxi =

Chinese badminton player (born 2002)

Han Qianxi 韩千禧
Personal information
- Born: 29 January 2002 (age 24) Lin'an, Zhejiang, China

Sport
- Country: China
- Sport: Badminton
- Handedness: Right

Women's singles
- Highest ranking: 26 (10 November 2026)
- Current ranking: 26 (10 November 2026)
- BWF profile
Medal record
Women's badminton
Representing China
Asian Games
| Gold medal – first place | 2026 Aichi–Nagoya | Women's team |
Asia Team Championships
| Silver medal – second place | 2026 Qingdao | Women's team |
Asian Junior Championships
| Silver medal – second place | 2019 Suzhou | Girls' singles |
| Bronze medal – third place | 2019 Suzhou | Mixed team |

Han Qianxi (Chinese: 韩千禧; pinyin: Hán Qiānxǐ; born 29 January 2002) is a Chinese badminton player.

== Achievements ==
=== Asian Junior Championships ===
Girls' singles
| Year | Venue | Opponent | Score | Result |
|---|---|---|---|---|
| 2019 | Suzhou Olympic Sports Centre; Suzhou, China | (China) Zhou Meng | 12–21, 9–21 | Silver |

=== BWF World Tour (2 titles, 3 runners-up) ===
The BWF World Tour, which was announced on 19 March 2017 and implemented in 2018, is a series of elite badminton tournaments sanctioned by the Badminton World Federation (BWF). The BWF World Tour is divided into levels of World Tour Finals, Super 1000, Super 750, Super 500, Super 300 (part of the HSBC World Tour), and the BWF Tour Super 100.

Women's singles
| Year | Tournament | Level | Opponent | Score | Result | Ref. |
|---|---|---|---|---|---|---|
| 2024 | Baoji China Masters | Super 100 | (China) Dai Wang | 21–23, 21–18, 22–20 | (gold) Winner | |
| 2024 | Korea Masters | Super 300 | (Indonesia) Putri Kusuma Wardani | 14–21, 14–21 | (silver) Runner-up | |
| 2025 | Ruichang China Masters | Super 100 | (China) Zhang Yiman | 13–21, 14–21 | (silver) Runner-up | |
| 2026 | German Open | Super 300 | (China) Wang Zhiyi | 21–19, 22–20 | (gold) Winner | |
| 2026 | Korea Masters | Super 300 | (India) Ashmita Chaliha | 21–14, 14–21, 14–21 | (silver) Runner-up | |

=== BWF Junior International (2 titles,1 runner-up) ===
Girls' singles
| Year | Tournament | Opponent | Score | Result |
|---|---|---|---|---|
| 2018 | Malaysia International Junior Open | (Indonesia) Stephanie Widjaja | 21–12, 21–11 | (gold) Winner |
| 2019 | Dutch Junior International | (Japan) Riko Gunji | 21–13, 23–21 | (gold) Winner |
| 2019 | German Junior International | (China) Zhou Meng | 14–21, 17–21 | (silver) Runner-up |

BWF Junior International Grand Prix tournament
BWF Junior International Challenge tournament
BWF Junior International Series tournament
BWF Junior Future Series tournament
