= Stephanie Widjaja =

Indonesian badminton player

Personal information
- Born: 19 February 2003 (age 23) Jakarta, Indonesia

Sport
- Country: Indonesia
- Sport: Badminton
- Handedness: Right

Women's singles
- Highest ranking: 82 (18 April 2023)
- Current ranking: 115 (27 August 2024)
- BWF profile
Medal record
Women's badminton
Representing Indonesia
Asia Team Championships
Gold medal – first place	2022 Selangor	Women's team
Bronze medal – third place	2024 Selangor	Women's team
SEA Games
Silver medal – second place	2021 Vietnam	Women's team
Silver medal – second place	2023 Cambodia	Women's team
World Junior Championships
Gold medal – first place	2019 Kazan	Mixed team
Bronze medal – third place	2018 Markham	Mixed team
Asian Junior Championships
Silver medal – second place	2019 Suzhou	Mixed team
Bronze medal – third place	2018 Jakarta	Mixed team

Stephanie Widjaja (born 19 February 2003) is an Indonesian badminton player affiliated with Jaya Raya Jakarta club. She was part of the national junior team that won the first Suhandinata Cup for Indonesia in 2019 BWF World Junior Championships. She also featured in the Indonesian women's winning team at the 2022 Asia Team Championships.

== Career ==
In May 2023, Widjaja join the women's team at the 2023 SEA Games – women's team event and took the silver medal after losing to Thai team.

In September, Widjaja lost at the second round of Indonesia Masters Super 100 I from 4th seed fellow Indonesian player Komang Ayu Cahya Dewi in straight games.

== Achievements ==
=== BWF International Challenge/Series (1 title, 1 runner-up) ===
Women's singles
Year	Tournament	Opponent	Score	Result
2022	Bonn International	(Chinese Taipei) Sung Shuo-yun	21–18, 21–15	(gold) Winner
2022	Indonesia International	(Indonesia) Mutiara Ayu Puspitasari	21–15, 10–21, 20–22	(silver) Runner-up

BWF International Challenge tournament
BWF International Series tournament
BWF Future Series tournament

=== BWF Junior International (2 runners-up) ===
Girls' singles
Year	Tournament	Opponent	Score	Result
2018	Malaysia International Junior Open	(China) Han Qianxi	12–21, 11–21	(silver) Runner-up
2020	German Junior	(Japan) Manami Suizu	21–18, 15–21, 17–21	(silver) Runner-up

BWF Junior International Grand Prix tournament
BWF Junior International Challenge tournament
BWF Junior International Series tournament
BWF Junior Future Series tournament

== Performance timeline ==
Key

W	Won	F	Finalist	SF	Semi-finalist
QF	Quarter-finalist	#R	Rounds 4, 3, 2, 1	RR	Round-robin stage
Q#	Qualification round	A	Absent	w/d	Withdrew
G	Gold	S	Silver	B	Bronze
NH	Not held	N/A	Not applicable	DNQ	Did not qualify

=== National team ===
- Junior level

Team events	2018	2019
Asian Junior Championships	B	S
World Junior Championships	B	G

- Senior level

Team events	2021	2022	2023	2024	Ref
SEA Games	S	NH	S	NH	
Asia Team Championships	NH	G	NH	B	

=== Individual competitions ===
- Junior level

Events	2018	2019
Asian Junior Championships	2R	2R
World Junior Championships	2R	QF

- Senior level

Events	2022
Asian Championships	1R

Tournament	BWF World Tour							Best	Ref
Tournament	2018	2019	2020	2021	2022	2023	2024	Best	Ref
Ruichang China Masters	A		NH			w/d	A	—	
Indonesia Masters Super 100	1R	A	NH		1R	2R	QF	QF ('23 II, '24 I)	
Indonesia Masters Super 100	1R	A	NH		1R	QF	A	QF ('23 II, '24 I)	
Guwahati Masters	NH					1R	A	1R ('23)	
Odisha Masters	NH				A	2R	A	2R ('23)	
Year-end ranking	267	266	333	283	111	95	205	82	
