= Kazan Gymnastics Center =

Indoor sports arena in Kazan, Russia

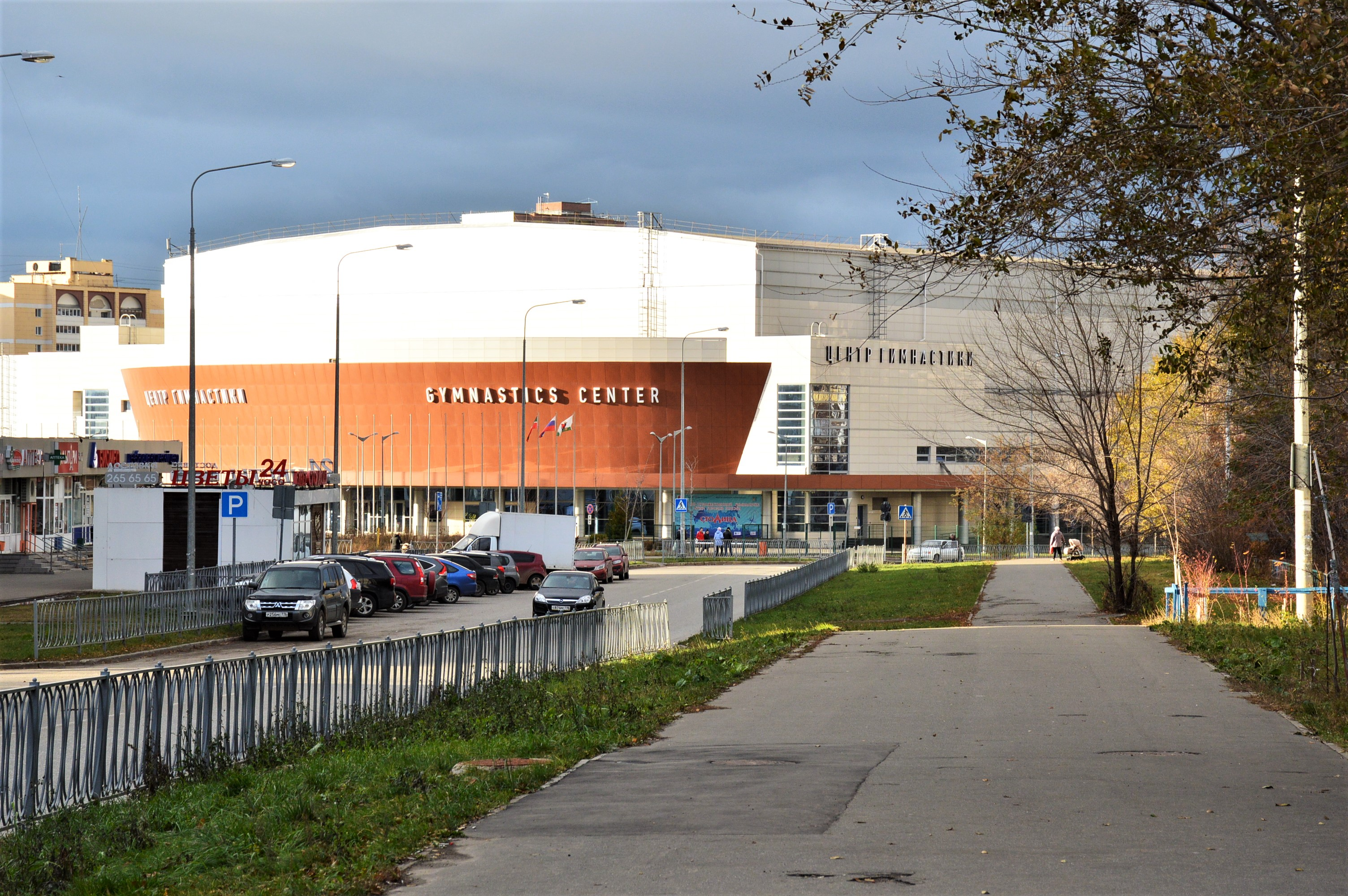
- Interactive map of Kazan Gymnastics Center
- Address: Syrtlanovoy 6 Kazan, Russia
- Coordinates: 55.7487°N 49.1962°E
- Capacity: 3,200
- Field size: 72 × 48 m

Construction
- Built: 2010
- Opened: 14 November 2012
- Cost: ₽ 1 billion

The Kazan Gymnastics Center (Russian: центр гимнастики Казань) is an indoor sports arena in Kazan, Russia. Built for 2013 Summer Universiade, it was inaugurated on 14 November 2012. Currently it is used for training athletes from Kazan Youth Sports Schools and Volga Region State Academy of Physical Culture, Sport and Tourism. There are also daily classes conducted by Olympic champion Yulia Barsukova

== Tournament hosted ==
- 2013 Summer Universiade gymnastics competitions
- 2014 European Badminton Championships
- 2016 and 2018 European Men's and Women's Team Badminton Championships
- 2017 World Wushu Championships
- Rhythmic Gymnastics World Cup
- 2019 BWF World Junior Championships
