= 2022 Uber Cup group stage =

Badminton Team Tournament in Bangkok

The 2022 Uber Cup group stage was held at the Impact Arena in Bangkok, Thailand, from 8 to 11 May 2022.

The group stage will be the first stage of the tournament where only the two highest-placing teams in each of the four groups will advance to the knockout stage.

== Draw ==
The original draw for the tournament was conducted on 1 April 2022, at 15:00 ICT, at Arnoma Grand Bangkok in Bangkok, Thailand. The 16 teams will be drawn into four groups each containing four teams and were allocated to four pots based on the World Team Rankings of 22 February 2022.

Pot 1	Pot 2	Pot 3	Pot 4
Japan; South Korea; China; Thailand	Indonesia; Denmark; India; Chinese Taipei	Malaysia; Spain; Canada; France	Germany; United States; Australia; Egypt

=== Group composition ===
Group
Group A	Group B	Group C	Group D
Japan; Indonesia; France; Germany	China; Chinese Taipei; Spain; Australia	Thailand (Host); Denmark; Malaysia; Egypt	South Korea; India; Canada; United States

== Group A ==
Pos	Team	Pld	W	L	GF	GA	GD	PF	PA	PD	Pts	Qualification
1	Japan	3	3	0	28	3	+25	647	405	+242	3	Advance to quarter-finals
2	Indonesia	3	2	1	23	13	+10	672	594	+78	2	Advance to quarter-finals
3	Germany	3	1	2	8	25	−17	474	623	−149	1	
4	France	3	0	3	8	26	−18	511	682	−171	0	

Source: Tournament software
Rules for classification: Tiebreakers

=== Indonesia vs France ===
Indonesia
5
Impact Arena Court 3
8 May 2022, 9:00 UTC+7

France
0

			1	2	3
1	(Indonesia) (France)	Komang Ayu Cahya Dewi; Qi Xuefei	22; 20	19; 21	21; 18
2	(Indonesia) (France)	Febriana Dwipuji Kusuma / Amalia Cahaya Pratiwi; Vimala Hériau / Margot Lambert	21; 13	27; 25
3	(Indonesia) (France)	Aisyah Sativa Fatetani; Léonice Huet	12; 21	21; 13	21; 15
4	(Indonesia) (France)	Nita Violina Marwah / Lanny Tria Mayasari; Flavie Vallet / Émilie Vercelot	21; 14	21; 11
5	(Indonesia) (France)	Bilqis Prasista; Yaëlle Hoyaux	17; 21	21; 14	21; 18

=== Japan vs Germany ===
Japan
5
Impact Arena Court 2
8 May 2022, 19:00 UTC+7

Germany
0

			1	2	3
1	(Japan) (Germany)	Akane Yamaguchi; Yvonne Li	21; 17	21; 19
2	(Japan) (Germany)	Mayu Matsumoto / Wakana Nagahara; Linda Efler / Emma Moszczynski	21; 11	21; 12
3	(Japan) (Germany)	Nozomi Okuhara; Ann-Kathrin Spoeri	21; 7	21; 8
4	(Japan) (Germany)	Nami Matsuyama / Chiharu Shida; Annabella Jäger / Leona Michalski	21; 17	21; 15
5	(Japan) (Germany)	Saena Kawakami; Selin Hübsch	21; 6	21; 12

=== Japan vs France ===
Japan
5
Impact Arena Court 1
10 May 2022, 9:00 UTC+7

France
0

			1	2	3
1	(Japan) (France)	Akane Yamaguchi; Léonice Huet	21; 6	21; 8
2	(Japan) (France)	Yuki Fukushima / Sayaka Hirota; Vimala Hériau / Margot Lambert	21; 9	21; 12
3	(Japan) (France)	Sayaka Takahashi; Yaëlle Hoyaux	21; 7	21; 8
4	(Japan) (France)	Mayu Matsumoto / Misaki Matsutomo; Flavie Vallet / Émilie Vercelot	21; 14	21; 13
5	(Japan) (France)	Riko Gunji; Émilie Drouin	21; 16	21; 17

=== Indonesia vs Germany ===
Indonesia
5
Impact Arena Court 2
10 May 2022, 9:00 UTC+7

Germany
0

			1	2	3
1	(Indonesia) (Germany)	Komang Ayu Cahya Dewi; Yvonne Li	21; 15	21; 13
2	(Indonesia) (Germany)	Febriana Dwipuji Kusuma / Amalia Cahaya Pratiwi; Linda Efler / Emma Moszczynski	21; 11	21; 2
3	(Indonesia) (Germany)	Aisyah Sativa Fatetani; Ann-Kathrin Spoeri	21; 7	14; 21	21; 14
4	(Indonesia) (Germany)	Nita Violina Marwah / Lanny Tria Mayasari; Annabella Jäger / Leona Michalski	21; 10	21; 10
5	(Indonesia) (Germany)	Bilqis Prasista; Florentine Schöffski	21; 12	12; 21	21; 7

=== Japan vs Indonesia ===
Japan
4
Impact Arena Court 1
11 May 2022, 9:00 UTC+7

Indonesia
1

			1	2	3
1	(Japan) (Indonesia)	Akane Yamaguchi; Bilqis Prasista	19; 21	19; 21
2	(Japan) (Indonesia)	Nami Matsuyama / Chiharu Shida; Melani Mamahit / Tryola Nadia	21; 16	18; 21	21; 15
3	(Japan) (Indonesia)	Sayaka Takahashi; Tasya Farahnailah	21; 9	21; 5
4	(Japan) (Indonesia)	Yuki Fukushima / Mayu Matsumoto; Lanny Tria Mayasari / Jesita Putri Miantoro	21; 14	21; 15
5	(Japan) (Indonesia)	Riko Gunji; Siti Sarah Azzahra	21; 12	24; 22

=== France vs Germany ===
France
2
Impact Arena Court 3
11 May 2022, 9:00 UTC+7

Germany
3

			1	2	3
1	(France) (Germany)	Qi Xuefei; Yvonne Li	15; 21	7; 21
2	(France) (Germany)	Vimala Hériau / Margot Lambert; Linda Efler / Leona Michalski	21; 17	21; 13
3	(France) (Germany)	Yaëlle Hoyaux; Ann-Kathrin Spoeri	21; 16	10; 21	15; 21
4	(France) (Germany)	Flavie Vallet / Émilie Vercelot; Stine Kuespert / Emma Moszczynski	11; 21	14; 21
5	(France) (Germany)	Émilie Drouin; Florentine Schöffski	21; 18	21; 17

== Group B ==
Pos	Team	Pld	W	L	GF	GA	GD	PF	PA	PD	Pts	Qualification
1	China	3	3	0	30	1	+29	650	357	+293	3	Advance to quarter-finals
2	Chinese Taipei	3	2	1	20	12	+8	594	487	+107	2	Advance to quarter-finals
3	Spain	3	1	2	10	22	−12	441	609	−168	1	
4	Australia	3	0	3	3	28	−25	373	605	−232	0	

Source: Tournament software
Rules for classification: Tiebreakers

=== Chinese Taipei vs Spain ===
Chinese Taipei
4
Impact Arena Court 1
8 May 2022, 9:00 UTC+7

Spain
1

			1	2	3
1	(Chinese Taipei) (Spain)	Tai Tzu-ying; Clara Azurmendi	21; 5	21; 14
2	(Chinese Taipei) (Spain)	Hsu Wen-chi; Lucía Rodríguez	21; 16	21; 15
3	(Chinese Taipei) (Spain)	Sung Shuo-yun; Ania Setién	21; 12	21; 15
4	(Chinese Taipei) (Spain)	Hsu Ya-ching / Lee Chia-hsin; Clara Azurmendi / Beatriz Corrales	18; 21	21; 11	14; 21
5	(Chinese Taipei) (Spain)	Chang Ching-hui / Lee Chih-chen; Lucía Rodríguez / Ania Setién	21; 10	21; 18

=== China vs Australia ===
China
5
Impact Arena Court 4
8 May 2022, 19:00 UTC+7

Australia
0

			1	2	3
1	(China) (Australia)	Chen Yufei; Chen Hsuan-yu	21; 19	21; 10
2	(China) (Australia)	Zhang Shuxian / Zheng Yu; Joyce Choong / Angela Yu	21; 12	21; 12
3	(China) (Australia)	He Bingjiao; Louisa Ma	21; 6	21; 6
4	(China) (Australia)	Du Yue / Li Wenmei; Kaitlyn Ea / Gronya Somerville	21; 11	21; 5
5	(China) (Australia)	Zhang Yiman; Tiffany Ho	21; 6	21; 9

=== China vs Spain ===
China
5
Impact Arena Court 3
9 May 2022, 19:00 UTC+7

Spain
0

			1	2	3
1	(China) (Spain)	Chen Yufei; Clara Azurmendi	21; 16	23; 21
2	(China) (Spain)	He Bingjiao; Lucía Rodríguez	21; 2	21; 8
3	(China) (Spain)	Wang Zhiyi; Ania Setién	21; 10	21; 6
4	(China) (Spain)	Chen Qingchen / Jia Yifan; Beatriz Corrales / Lorena Uslé	21; 9	21; 9
5	(China) (Spain)	Du Yue / Li Wenmei; Lucía Rodríguez / Ania Setién	21; 5	21; 12

=== Chinese Taipei vs Australia ===
Chinese Taipei
5
Impact Arena Court 4
9 May 2022, 19:00 UTC+7

Australia
0

			1	2	3
1	(Chinese Taipei) (Australia)	Tai Tzu-ying; Chen Hsuan-yu	21; 6	21; 5
2	(Chinese Taipei) (Australia)	Hsu Ya-ching / Lin Wan-ching; Sylvina Kurniawan / Angela Yu	21; 7	21; 14
3	(Chinese Taipei) (Australia)	Wen Chi-hsu; Louisa Ma	21; 9	21; 12
4	(Chinese Taipei) (Australia)	Lee Chia-hsin / Teng Chun-hsun; Kaitlyn Ea / Gronya Somerville	21; 10	21; 13
5	(Chinese Taipei) (Australia)	Chen Su-yu; Tiffany Ho	21; 12	21; 13

=== China vs Chinese Taipei ===
China
5
Impact Arena Court 1
10 May 2022, 19:00 UTC+7

Chinese Taipei
0

			1	2	3
1	(China) (Chinese Taipei)	Chen Yufei; Hsu Wen-chi	21; 15	21; 13
2	(China) (Chinese Taipei)	Chen Qingchen / Jia Yifan; Lee Chia-hsin / Teng Chun-hsun	21; 12	21; 11
3	(China) (Chinese Taipei)	He Bingjiao; Sung Shuo-yun	18; 21	21; 15	21; 18
4	(China) (Chinese Taipei)	Huang Dongping / Li Wenmei; Chang Ching-hui / Lee Chih-chen	21; 10	21; 13
5	(China) (Chinese Taipei)	Wang Zhiyi; Chen Su-yu	21; 16	21; 19

=== Spain vs Australia ===
Spain
4
Impact Arena Court 3
10 May 2022, 19:00 UTC+7

Australia
1

			1	2	3
1	(Spain) (Australia)	Carolina Marín; Chen Hsuan-yu	21; 12	21; 18
2	(Spain) (Australia)	Clara Azurmendi; Louisa Ma	21; 11	21; 13
3	(Spain) (Australia)	Beatriz Corrales; Tiffany Ho	21; 14	17; 21	21; 14
4	(Spain) (Australia)	Lucía Rodríguez / Ania Setién; Kaitlyn Ea / Angela Yu	21; 16	21; 15
5	(Spain) (Australia)	Clara Azurmendi / Beatriz Corrales; Chen Hsuan-yu / Gronya Somerville				w/o

== Group C ==
Pos	Team	Pld	W	L	GF	GA	GD	PF	PA	PD	Pts	Qualification
1	Thailand (H)	3	3	0	29	7	+22	726	461	+265	3	Advance to quarter-finals
2	Denmark	3	2	1	21	14	+7	627	528	+99	2	Advance to quarter-finals
3	Malaysia	3	1	2	17	16	+1	565	549	+16	1	
4	Egypt	3	0	3	0	30	−30	250	630	−380	0	

Source: Tournament software
Rules for classification: Tiebreakers
(H) Host

=== Denmark vs Malaysia ===
Denmark
3
Impact Arena Court 1
8 May 2022, 14:00 UTC+7

Malaysia
2

			1	2	3
1	(Denmark) (Malaysia)	Mia Blichfeldt; Kisona Selvaduray	21; 14	21; 15
2	(Denmark) (Malaysia)	Maiken Fruergaard / Sara Thygesen; Pearly Tan / Thinaah Muralitharan	19; 21	19; 21
3	(Denmark) (Malaysia)	Line Christophersen; Goh Jin Wei	12; 21	21; 11	5; 21
4	(Denmark) (Malaysia)	Alexandra Bøje / Amalie Magelund; Anna Cheong / Teoh Mei Xing	21; 14	21; 10
5	(Denmark) (Malaysia)	Line Kjærsfeldt; Myisha Mohd Khairul	21; 12	21; 9

=== Thailand vs Egypt ===
Thailand
5
Impact Arena Court 4
8 May 2022, 14:00 UTC+7

Egypt
0

			1	2	3
1	(Thailand) (Egypt)	Pornpawee Chochuwong; Doha Hany	21; 12	21; 5
2	(Thailand) (Egypt)	Busanan Ongbamrungphan; Nour Ahmed Youssri	21; 6	21; 2
3	(Thailand) (Egypt)	Phittayaporn Chaiwan; Hana Tarek	21; 4	21; 8
4	(Thailand) (Egypt)	Laksika Kanlaha / Phataimas Muenwong; Jana Ashraf / Jana Abdelkader	21; 6	21; 8
5	(Thailand) (Egypt)	Benyapa Aimsaard / Nuntakarn Aimsaard; Nour Ahmed Youssri / Hana Tarek	21; 3	21; 6

=== Thailand vs Malaysia ===
Thailand
4
Impact Arena Court 1
9 May 2022, 14:00 UTC+7

Malaysia
1

			1	2	3
1	(Thailand) (Malaysia)	Ratchanok Intanon; Goh Jin Wei	14; 21	21; 14	21; 15
2	(Thailand) (Malaysia)	Jongkolphan Kititharakul / Rawinda Prajongjai; Pearly Tan / Thinaah Muralitharan	21; 16	19; 21	17; 21
3	(Thailand) (Malaysia)	Pornpawee Chochuwong; Myisha Mohd Khairul	22; 20	21; 10
4	(Thailand) (Malaysia)	Benyapa Aimsaard / Nuntakarn Aimsaard; Valeree Siow / Teoh Mei Xing	21; 9	21; 14
5	(Thailand) (Malaysia)	Busanan Ongbamrungphan; Tan Zhing Yi	21; 19	21; 6

=== Denmark vs Egypt ===
Denmark
5
Impact Arena Court 4
9 May 2022, 14:00 UTC+7

Egypt
0

			1	2	3
1	(Denmark) (Egypt)	Line Christophersen; Doha Hany	21; 10	21; 11
2	(Denmark) (Egypt)	Line Kjærsfeldt; Nour Ahmed Youssri	21; 6	21; 6
3	(Denmark) (Egypt)	Julie Dawall Jakobsen; Hana Tarek	21; 3	21; 7
4	(Denmark) (Egypt)	Amalie Schulz / Sara Thygesen; Jana Ashraf / Jana Abdelkader	21; 10	21; 7
5	(Denmark) (Egypt)	Alexandra Bøje / Amalie Magelund; Nour Ahmed Youssri / Hana Tarek	21; 12	21; 11

=== Thailand vs Denmark ===
Thailand
5
Impact Arena Court 2
10 May 2022, 19:00 UTC+7

Denmark
0

			1	2	3
1	(Thailand) (Denmark)	Ratchanok Intanon; Mia Blichfeldt	21; 13	21; 19
2	(Thailand) (Denmark)	Jongkolphan Kititharakul / Rawinda Prajongjai; Maiken Fruergaard / Sara Thygesen	14; 21	21; 19	21; 9
3	(Thailand) (Denmark)	Pornpawee Chochuwong; Line Christophersen	18; 21	21; 6	21; 7
4	(Thailand) (Denmark)	Benyapa Aimsaard / Nuntakarn Aimsaard; Alexandra Bøje / Amalie Magelund	21; 15	16; 21	21; 17
5	(Thailand) (Denmark)	Busanan Ongbamrungphan; Line Kjærsfeldt	21; 10	18; 21	21; 16

=== Malaysia vs Egypt ===
Malaysia
5
Impact Arena Court 4
10 May 2022, 19:00 UTC+7

Egypt
0

			1	2	3
1	(Malaysia) (Egypt)	Myisha Mohd Khairul; Doha Hany	21; 5	21; 19
2	(Malaysia) (Egypt)	Tan Zhing Yi; Nour Ahmed Youssri	21; 12	21; 14
3	(Malaysia) (Egypt)	Chan Wen Tse; Hana Tarek	21; 16	21; 16
4	(Malaysia) (Egypt)	Low Yeen Yuan / Valeree Siow; Jana Ashraf / Jana Abdelkader	21; 6	21; 10
5	(Malaysia) (Egypt)	Anna Cheong / Teoh Mei Xing; Nour Ahmed Youssri / Hana Tarek	21; 5	21; 4

== Group D ==
Pos	Team	Pld	W	L	GF	GA	GD	PF	PA	PD	Pts	Qualification
1	South Korea	3	3	0	29	4	+25	677	465	+212	3	Advance to quarter-finals
2	India	3	2	1	17	16	+1	577	580	−3	2	Advance to quarter-finals
3	Canada	3	1	2	16	22	−6	666	727	−61	1	
4	United States	3	0	3	7	27	−20	535	683	−148	0	

Source: Tournament software
Rules for classification: Tiebreakers

=== South Korea vs United States ===
South Korea
5
Impact Arena Court 4
8 May 2022, 9:00 UTC+7

United States
0

			1	2	3
1	(South Korea) (United States)	Kim Ga-eun; Lauren Lam	21; 15	23; 21
2	(South Korea) (United States)	Lee So-hee / Shin Seung-chan; Francesca Corbett / Allison Lee	21; 7	21; 11
3	(South Korea) (United States)	Sim Yu-jin; Esther Shi	21; 14	21; 10
4	(South Korea) (United States)	Baek Ha-na / Lee Yu-rim; Jennie Gai / Sanchita Pandey	21; 9	21; 8
5	(South Korea) (United States)	Lee Seo-jin; Natalie Chi	21; 19	21; 9

=== India vs Canada ===
India
4
Impact Arena Court 3
8 May 2022, 19:00 UTC+7

Canada
1

			1	2	3
1	(India) (Canada)	P. V. Sindhu; Michelle Li	21; 17	21; 10
2	(India) (Canada)	Shruti Mishra / Simran Singhi; Rachel Honderich / Kristen Tsai	19; 21	12; 21
3	(India) (Canada)	Aakarshi Kashyap; Wen Yu Zhang	17; 21	21; 18	21; 17
4	(India) (Canada)	Tanisha Crasto / Treesa Jolly; Catherine Choi / Josephine Wu	21; 9	21; 15
5	(India) (Canada)	Ashmita Chaliha; Rachel Chan	12; 21	21; 11	22; 20

=== India vs United States ===
India
4
Impact Arena Court 3
10 May 2022, 9:00 UTC+7

United States
1

			1	2	3
1	(India) (United States)	P. V. Sindhu; Jennie Gai	21; 10	21; 11
2	(India) (United States)	Tanisha Crasto / Treesa Jolly; Francesca Corbett / Allison Lee	21; 19	21; 10
3	(India) (United States)	Aakarshi Kashyap; Esther Shi	21; 18	21; 11
4	(India) (United States)	Simran Singhi / Ritika Thaker; Lauren Lam / Kodi Tang Lee	12; 21	21; 17	13; 21
5	(India) (United States)	Ashmita Chaliha; Natalie Chi	21; 18	21; 13

=== South Korea vs Canada ===
South Korea
4
Impact Arena Court 4
10 May 2022, 9:00 UTC+7

Canada
1

			1	2	3
1	(South Korea) (Canada)	An Se-young; Michelle Li	21; 19	21; 13
2	(South Korea) (Canada)	Kim So-yeong / Kong Hee-yong; Rachel Honderich / Kristen Tsai	17; 21	22; 20	21; 14
3	(South Korea) (Canada)	Kim Ga-eun; Wen Yu Zhang	17; 21	21; 14	20; 22
4	(South Korea) (Canada)	Jeong Na-eun / Kim Hye-jeong; Catherine Choi / Crystal Lai	21; 9	21; 14
5	(South Korea) (Canada)	Sim Yu-jin; Talia Ng	11; 21	21; 8	21; 12

=== South Korea vs India ===
South Korea
5
Impact Arena Court 2
11 May 2022, 9:00 UTC+7

India
0

			1	2	3
1	(South Korea) (India)	An Se-young; P. V. Sindhu	21; 15	21; 14
2	(South Korea) (India)	Lee So-hee / Shin Seung-chan; Shruti Mishra / Simran Singhi	21; 13	21; 12
3	(South Korea) (India)	Kim Ga-eun; Aakarshi Kashyap	21; 10	21; 10
4	(South Korea) (India)	Kim Hye-jeong / Kong Hee-yong; Tanisha Crasto / Treesa Jolly	21; 14	21; 11
5	(South Korea) (India)	Sim Yu-jin; Ashmita Chaliha	21; 18	21; 17

=== Canada vs United States ===
Canada
3
Impact Arena Court 4
11 May 2022, 9:00 UTC+7

United States
2

			1	2	3
1	(Canada) (United States)	Michelle Li; Lauren Lam	25; 23	14; 21	20; 22
2	(Canada) (United States)	Rachel Honderich / Kristen Tsai; Francesca Corbett / Allison Lee	16; 21	21; 17	21; 16
3	(Canada) (United States)	Talia Ng; Jennie Gai	21; 12	12; 21	22; 24
4	(Canada) (United States)	Crystal Lai / Josephine Wu; Kodi Tang Lee / Sanchita Pandey	22; 20	21; 11
5	(Canada) (United States)	Rachel Chan; Natalie Chi	21; 17	21; 18
