= 2022 Thomas & Uber Cup =

Biennial international badminton team championship

2022 Thomas & Uber Cup โธมัส-อูเบอร์ คัพ 2022

Tournament details
- Dates: 8–15 May 2022
- Edition: 32nd (Thomas Cup); 29th (Uber Cup)
- Level: International
- Nations: 16 (Thomas Cup); 16 (Uber Cup)
- Venue: Impact Arena
- Location: Nonthaburi, Thailand
- Official website: bwfthomasubercups.com

The 2022 Thomas & Uber Cup (officially known as the TotalEnergies BWF Thomas & Uber Cup Finals 2022 for sponsorship reasons) was the 32nd edition of the Thomas Cup and the 29th edition of the Uber Cup, the biennial international badminton championship contested by the men and women's national teams of the member associations of Badminton World Federation (BWF). The tournament was hosted at Bangkok, Thailand in the Impact Arena from 8 to 15 May 2022. This marks the third time Thailand has hosted the Thomas Cup, and second time for the Uber Cup. The tournament returns to its usual two-year cycle after the previous tournament was delayed for a year to 2021 due to the COVID-19 pandemic.

Indonesia were the defending champions for the men's team, and China for the women's team.

The tournament was contested by 16 nations each in the men's and women's discipline, with a format of group stage from which top two teams qualify for the knockout stage. Denmark, India, Indonesia and Japan reached the semi-finals of the Thomas Cup while China, Japan, South Korea and Thailand were qualified to play the semi-finals of the Uber Cup.

The men's event finals was between Indonesia and India. India won 3–0 for their first title. The women's event finals was between China and South Korea in which the South Korean team won 3–2 for their second title.

== Host selection ==
Bangkok was named as the host in November 2018 during BWF Council meeting at Kuala Lumpur, Malaysia, where the BWF also announced the host for 18 major events, including Thomas and Uber Cup, Sudirman Cup, BWF World Championships, BWF World Junior Championships, and BWF World Senior Championships from 2019 to 2025.

== Qualification ==
Thailand qualified automatically as hosts, while Indonesia qualified as the trophy holder.

=== Thomas Cup ===
Means of qualification	Date	Venue	Slot	Qualified teams
Host country	29 November 2018	Bangkok	1	Thailand
2020 Thomas Cup	9–17 October 2021	Aarhus	1	Indonesia
2022 All Africa Team Championships	14–17 February 2022	Kampala	1	Algeria
2022 Asia Team Championships	15–20 February 2022	Shah Alam	3	Malaysia
2022 Asia Team Championships	15–20 February 2022	Shah Alam	3	South Korea
2022 Asia Team Championships	15–20 February 2022	Shah Alam	3	Singapore
2022 Pan Am Male & Female Cup	17–20 February 2022	Acapulco	1	Canada
World Team Rankings for Europe	22 February 2022	-	4	Denmark
World Team Rankings for Europe	22 February 2022	-	4	France
World Team Rankings for Europe	22 February 2022	-	4	England
World Team Rankings for Europe	22 February 2022	-	4	Germany
World Team Rankings for Oceania	22 February 2022	-	1	~~New Zealand~~^{B}
World Team Rankings for Asia	22 February 2022	-	1	Japan^{A}
World Team Rankings	22 February 2022	-	3	Chinese Taipei
World Team Rankings	22 February 2022	-	3	India
World Team Rankings	22 February 2022	-	3	China
World Team Rankings	22 February 2022	-	3	United States^{B}
Total			16	

- ^A Since Indonesia, one of the semifinalists for the Asian qualification tournament had already qualified as the defending champion, the spot was given to the best Asian team from World Team Ranking.
- ^B New Zealand withdrew from the tournament due to a significant number of their squad being unable to participate after testing positive for COVID-19. They will be replaced by United States as no other Oceanian member association was able to fulfil the continental quota place. Hong Kong and Spain, the next highest ranking member associations (overall), were also unable to participate.

=== Uber Cup ===
Means of qualification	Date	Venue	Slot	Qualified teams
Host country	29 November 2018	Kuala Lumpur	1	Thailand
2020 Uber Cup	9–17 October 2021	Aarhus	1	China
2022 All Africa Team Championships	14–17 February 2022	Kampala	1	Egypt
2022 Asia Team Championships	15–20 February 2022	Shah Alam	4	Indonesia
2022 Asia Team Championships	15–20 February 2022	Shah Alam	4	South Korea
2022 Asia Team Championships	15–20 February 2022	Shah Alam	4	Japan
2022 Asia Team Championships	15–20 February 2022	Shah Alam	4	Malaysia
2022 Pan Am Male & Female Cup	17–20 February 2022	Acapulco	1	United States
World Team Rankings for Europe	22 February 2022	Kuala Lumpur	4	Denmark
World Team Rankings for Europe	22 February 2022	Kuala Lumpur	4	Spain
World Team Rankings for Europe	22 February 2022	Kuala Lumpur	4	France
World Team Rankings for Europe	22 February 2022	Kuala Lumpur	4	~~Russia~~^{1}
World Team Rankings for Europe	22 February 2022	Kuala Lumpur	4	Germany^{1}
World Team Rankings for Oceania	22 February 2022	Kuala Lumpur	1	Australia
World Team Rankings	22 February 2022	Kuala Lumpur	3	India
World Team Rankings	22 February 2022	Kuala Lumpur	3	Chinese Taipei
World Team Rankings	22 February 2022	Kuala Lumpur	3	Canada
Total			16	

Note

- ^1 Russia suspended from any BWF events until further notice. Therefore, the quota was given to Germany as the next highest ranked team for Europe.

== Draw ==
The draw for the tournament was conducted on 1 April 2022, at 15:00 ICT, at Arnoma Grand Bangkok in Bangkok, Thailand. The 16 men and 16 women teams were drawn into four groups of four.

For the Thomas Cup draw, the teams were allocated to four pots based on the World Team Rankings of 22 February 2022. Pot 1 contained the top seed Indonesia (which were assigned to position A1), the second seed Japan (which were assigned to position D1) and the next two best teams, Denmark and Chinese Taipei. Pot 2 contained the next best four teams, Pot 3 contained the ninth to twelfth seeds, and Pot 4 for the thirteenth to sixteenth seeds.

A similar procedure was applied for the Uber Cup draw, where top seed Japan (were assigned to position A1), the second seed, South Korea (were assigned to position D1), China and Thailand were in Pot 1.

Thomas Cup

Pot 1	Pot 2	Pot 3	Pot 4
Indonesia; Japan; Denmark; Chinese Taipei	India; Malaysia; China; South Korea	Thailand; France; England; Germany	Canada; Singapore; Algeria; New Zealand

Uber Cup

Pot 1	Pot 2	Pot 3	Pot 4
Japan; South Korea; China; Thailand	Indonesia; Denmark; India; Chinese Taipei	Malaysia; Spain; Canada; France	Germany; United States; Australia; Egypt

== Tiebreakers ==
The rankings of teams in each group were determined per BWF Statutes Section 5.1, Article 16.3:

1. Number of matches won;
2. Match result between the teams in question;
3. Match difference in all group matches;
4. Game difference in all group matches;
5. Point difference in all group matches.

== Medal summary ==
=== Medalists ===
Event	Gold	Silver	Bronze
Thomas Cup	India; Lakshya Sen; Srikanth Kidambi; Prannoy H. S. Priyanshu Rajawat; Satwiksairaj Rankireddy; Chirag Shetty; Arjun M. R. Dhruv Kapila; Krishna Prasad Garaga; Vishnuvardhan Goud Panjala	Indonesia; Anthony Sinisuka Ginting; Jonatan Christie; Shesar Hiren Rhustavito; Tegar Sulistio; Syabda Perkasa Belawa; Kevin Sanjaya Sukamuljo; Mohammad Ahsan; Hendra Setiawan; Fajar Alfian; Muhammad Rian Ardianto; Bagas Maulana; Muhammad Shohibul Fikri	Denmark; Viktor Axelsen; Anders Antonsen; Rasmus Gemke; Hans-Kristian Vittinghus; Victor Svendsen; Kim Astrup; Anders Skaarup Rasmussen; Rasmus Kjær; Lasse Mølhede; Jeppe Bay; Mathias Christiansen; Frederik Søgaard
Thomas Cup	India; Lakshya Sen; Srikanth Kidambi; Prannoy H. S. Priyanshu Rajawat; Satwiksairaj Rankireddy; Chirag Shetty; Arjun M. R. Dhruv Kapila; Krishna Prasad Garaga; Vishnuvardhan Goud Panjala	Indonesia; Anthony Sinisuka Ginting; Jonatan Christie; Shesar Hiren Rhustavito; Tegar Sulistio; Syabda Perkasa Belawa; Kevin Sanjaya Sukamuljo; Mohammad Ahsan; Hendra Setiawan; Fajar Alfian; Muhammad Rian Ardianto; Bagas Maulana; Muhammad Shohibul Fikri	Japan; Kento Momota; Kanta Tsuneyama; Kenta Nishimoto; Kodai Naraoka; Riku Hatano; Takuro Hoki; Yugo Kobayashi; Yuta Watanabe; Akira Koga; Taichi Saito; Yoshinori Takeuchi; Keiichiro Matsui
Uber Cup	South Korea; An Se-young; Kim Ga-eun; Sim Yu-jin; Lee Seo-jin; Shin Seung-chan; Kim So-yeong; Kong Hee-yong; Baek Ha-na; Jeong Na-eun; Kim Hye-jeong; Lee Yu-rim	China; Chen Yufei; He Bingjiao; Wang Zhiyi; Han Yue; Zhang Yiman; Chen Qingchen; Jia Yifan; Zheng Yu; Li Wenmei; Zhang Shuxian; Du Yue; Huang Dongping	Japan; Akane Yamaguchi; Nozomi Okuhara; Sayaka Takahashi; Saena Kawakami; Riko Gunji; Yuki Fukushima; Sayaka Hirota; Mayu Matsumoto; Wakana Nagahara; Chiharu Shida; Nami Matsuyama; Misaki Matsutomo
Uber Cup	South Korea; An Se-young; Kim Ga-eun; Sim Yu-jin; Lee Seo-jin; Shin Seung-chan; Kim So-yeong; Kong Hee-yong; Baek Ha-na; Jeong Na-eun; Kim Hye-jeong; Lee Yu-rim	China; Chen Yufei; He Bingjiao; Wang Zhiyi; Han Yue; Zhang Yiman; Chen Qingchen; Jia Yifan; Zheng Yu; Li Wenmei; Zhang Shuxian; Du Yue; Huang Dongping	Thailand; Ratchanok Intanon; Pornpawee Chochuwong; Busanan Ongbamrungphan; Phittayaporn Chaiwan; Supanida Katethong; Pitchamon Opatniput; Rawinda Prajongjai; Benyapa Aimsaard; Nuntakarn Aimsaard; Phataimas Muenwong; Laksika Kanlaha

=== Medal table ===
* Host nation (Thailand)

Rank	Nation	Gold	Silver	Bronze	Total
1	India	1	0	0	1
1	South Korea	1	0	0	1
3	China	0	1	0	1
3	Indonesia	0	1	0	1
5	Japan	0	0	2	2
6	Denmark	0	0	1	1
6	Thailand*	0	0	1	1
Totals (7 entries)		2	2	4	8

== Thomas Cup ==
=== Group stage ===
In the initial stage of the tournament, the teams were placed in groups of four where they contested against each other. Winning a match nets one point for the team. The top two teams from each of the four groups advanced to the knockout stage. The matches were played from 8 to 11 May 2022.

==== Group A ====
Pos	Team	Pld	W	L	GF	GA	GD	PF	PA	PD	Pts	Qualification
1	Indonesia	3	3	0	25	12	+13	717	629	+88	**3**	Advance to quarter-finals
2	South Korea	3	2	1	19	18	+1	633	655	−22	**2**	Advance to quarter-finals
3	Thailand (H)	3	1	2	14	21	−7	624	650	−26	**1**	
4	Singapore	3	0	3	15	22	−7	650	690	−40	**0**	

Source: Tournament software
Rules for classification: Tiebreakers
(H) Host

8 May 2022
14:00 UTC+7

**Indonesia**	4–1	**Singapore**
Report

Impact Arena Court 2, Nonthaburi

8 May 2022
19:00 UTC+7

**South Korea**	3–2	**Thailand**
Report

Impact Arena Court 1, Nonthaburi

9 May 2022
19:00 UTC+7

**Indonesia**	4–1	**Thailand**
Report

Impact Arena Court 1, Nonthaburi

9 May 2022
19:00 UTC+7

**South Korea**	3–2	**Singapore**
Report

Impact Arena Court 2, Nonthaburi

11 May 2022
14:00 UTC+7

**Indonesia**	3–2	**South Korea**
Report

Impact Arena Court 1, Nonthaburi

11 May 2022
14:00 UTC+7

**Thailand**	3–2	**Singapore**
Report

Impact Arena Court 3, Nonthaburi

==== Group B ====
Pos	Team	Pld	W	L	GF	GA	GD	PF	PA	PD	Pts	Qualification
1	Denmark	3	3	0	27	6	+21	659	473	+186	**3**	Advance to quarter-finals
2	China	3	2	1	26	9	+17	698	543	+155	**2**	Advance to quarter-finals
3	France	3	1	2	12	20	−8	561	561	0	**1**	
4	Algeria	3	0	3	0	30	−30	289	630	−341	**0**	

Source: Tournament software
Rules for classification: Tiebreakers

9 May 2022
09:00 UTC+7

**China**	5–0	**France**
Report

Impact Arena Court 1, Nonthaburi

9 May 2022
09:00 UTC+7

**Denmark**	5–0	**Algeria**
Report

Impact Arena Court 4, Nonthaburi

10 May 2022
14:00 UTC+7

**Denmark**	5–0	**France**
Report

Impact Arena Court 2, Nonthaburi

10 May 2022
14:00 UTC+7

**China**	5–0	**Algeria**
Report

Impact Arena Court 3, Nonthaburi

11 May 2022
19:00 UTC+7

**Denmark**	3–2	**China**
Report

Impact Arena Court 1, Nonthaburi

11 May 2022
19:00 UTC+7

**France**	5–0	**Algeria**
Report

Impact Arena Court 4, Nonthaburi

==== Group C ====
Pos	Team	Pld	W	L	GF	GA	GD	PF	PA	PD	Pts	Qualification
1	Chinese Taipei	3	3	0	27	11	+16	754	635	+119	**3**	Advance to quarter-finals
2	India	3	2	1	26	11	+15	737	598	+139	**2**	Advance to quarter-finals
3	Germany	3	1	2	14	24	−10	641	719	−78	**1**	
4	Canada	3	0	3	7	28	−21	525	705	−180	**0**	

Source: Tournament software
Rules for classification: Tiebreakers

8 May 2022
09:00 UTC+7

**India**	5–0	**Germany**
Report

Impact Arena Court 2, Nonthaburi

8 May 2022
14:00 UTC+7

**Chinese Taipei**	5–0	**Canada**
Report

Impact Arena Court 3, Nonthaburi

9 May 2022
14:00 UTC+7

**Chinese Taipei**	5–0	**Germany**
Report

Impact Arena Court 2, Nonthaburi

9 May 2022
14:00 UTC+7

**India**	5–0	**Canada**
Report

Impact Arena Court 3, Nonthaburi

11 May 2022
14:00 UTC+7

**Chinese Taipei**	3–2	**India**
Report

Impact Arena Court 2, Nonthaburi

11 May 2022
14:00 UTC+7

**Germany**	3–2	**Canada**
Report

Impact Arena Court 4, Nonthaburi

==== Group D ====
Pos	Team	Pld	W	L	GF	GA	GD	PF	PA	PD	Pts	Qualification
1	Malaysia	3	3	0	27	6	+21	663	503	+160	**3**	Advance to quarter-finals
2	Japan	3	2	1	24	9	+15	646	460	+186	**2**	Advance to quarter-finals
3	England	3	1	2	13	22	−9	537	626	−89	**1**	
4	United States	3	0	3	2	29	−27	377	634	−257	**0**	

Source: Tournament software
Rules for classification: Tiebreakers

9 May 2022
09:00 UTC+7

**Malaysia**	5–0	**England**
Report

Impact Arena Court 2, Nonthaburi

9 May 2022
09:00 UTC+7

**Japan**	5–0	**United States**
Report

Impact Arena Court 3, Nonthaburi

10 May 2022
14:00 UTC+7

**Japan**	5–0	**England**
Report

Impact Arena Court 1, Nonthaburi

10 May 2022
14:00 UTC+7

**Malaysia**	5–0	**United States**
Report

Impact Arena Court 4, Nonthaburi

11 May 2022
19:00 UTC+7

**Japan**	2–3	**Malaysia**
Report

Impact Arena Court 2, Nonthaburi

11 May 2022
19:00 UTC+7

**England**	4–1	**United States**
Report

Impact Arena Court 3, Nonthaburi

=== Knockout stage ===
The knockout stage of the tournament started from 12 May 2022 on which the quarter-finals were held. Semi-finals were held on 13 May 2022 while the finals was held on 15 May 2022. Below is the bracket for the knockout round of the tournament, teams in bold denote match winners.

The draw was conducted on 11 May 2022, after the last match of the group stage.

Quarter-finals
**Indonesia**	**3**
China	0
Chinese Taipei	2
**Japan**	**3**
**India**	**3**
Malaysia	2
South Korea	2
**Denmark**	**3**

Semi-finals
**Indonesia**	**3**
Japan	2
**India**	**3**
Denmark	2

Final
Indonesia	0
**India**	**3**

==== Quarter-finals ====
12 May 2022
19:00 UTC+7

**Indonesia**	3–0	**China**
Report

Impact Arena Court 1, Nonthaburi

12 May 2022
14:00 UTC+7

**Chinese Taipei**	2–3	**Japan**
Report

Impact Arena Court 2, Nonthaburi

12 May 2022
19:00 UTC+7

**India**	3–2	**Malaysia**
Report

Impact Arena Court 3, Nonthaburi

12 May 2022
19:00 UTC+7

**South Korea**	2–3	**Denmark**
Report

Impact Arena Court 2, Nonthaburi

==== Semi-finals ====
13 May 2022
18:00 UTC+7

**Indonesia**	3–2	**Japan**
Report

Impact Arena Court 2, Nonthaburi

13 May 2022
18:00 UTC+7

**India**	3–2	**Denmark**
Report

Impact Arena Court 1, Nonthaburi

==== Final ====
15 May 2022
13:00 UTC+7

**Indonesia**	0–3	**India**
Report

Impact Arena Court 1, Nonthaburi

2022 Thomas Cup champions

**India**
**First title**

=== Final ranking ===
Pos	Team	Pld	W	L	Pts	MD	GD	PD	Final result
1st place, gold medalist(s)	India	6	5	1	5	+14	+20	+152	Champions
2nd place, silver medalist(s)	Indonesia	6	5	1	5	+8	+15	+117	Runners-up
3rd place, bronze medalist(s)	Denmark	5	4	1	4	+11	+22	+193	Eliminated in semi-finals
3rd place, bronze medalist(s)	Japan	5	3	2	3	+9	+16	+202	Eliminated in semi-finals
5	Malaysia	4	3	1	3	+10	+19	+136	Eliminated in quarter-finals
6	Chinese Taipei	4	3	1	3	+10	+14	+100	Eliminated in quarter-finals
7	China	4	2	2	2	+6	+12	+124	Eliminated in quarter-finals
8	South Korea	4	2	2	2	0	+1	–14	Eliminated in quarter-finals
9	Thailand	3	1	2	1	–3	–7	–26	Eliminated in group stage
10	France	3	1	2	1	–5	–8	0	Eliminated in group stage
11	England	3	1	2	1	–7	–9	–89	Eliminated in group stage
12	Germany	3	1	2	1	−9	−10	−78	Eliminated in group stage
13	Singapore	3	0	3	0	–5	–7	–40	Eliminated in group stage
14	Canada	3	0	3	0	−11	−21	−180	Eliminated in group stage
15	United States	3	0	3	0	–13	–27	–257	Eliminated in group stage
16	Algeria	3	0	3	0	–15	–30	–341	Eliminated in group stage

== Uber Cup ==
=== Group stage ===
==== Group A ====
Pos	Team	Pld	W	L	GF	GA	GD	PF	PA	PD	Pts	Qualification
1	Japan	3	3	0	28	3	+25	647	405	+242	**3**	Advance to quarter-finals
2	Indonesia	3	2	1	23	13	+10	672	594	+78	**2**	Advance to quarter-finals
3	Germany	3	1	2	8	25	−17	474	623	−149	**1**	
4	France	3	0	3	8	26	−18	511	682	−171	**0**	

Source: Tournament software
Rules for classification: Tiebreakers

8 May 2022
09:00 UTC+7

**Indonesia**	5–0	**France**
Report

Impact Arena Court 3, Nonthaburi

8 May 2022
19:00 UTC+7

**Japan**	5–0	**Germany**
Report

Impact Arena Court 2, Nonthaburi

10 May 2022
09:00 UTC+7

**Japan**	5–0	**France**
Report

Impact Arena Court 1, Nonthaburi

10 May 2022
09:00 UTC+7

**Indonesia**	5–0	**Germany**
Report

Impact Arena Court 2, Nonthaburi

11 May 2022
09:00 UTC+7

**Japan**	4–1	**Indonesia**
Report

Impact Arena Court 1, Nonthaburi

11 May 2022
09:00 UTC+7

**France**	2–3	**Germany**
Report

Impact Arena Court 3, Nonthaburi

==== Group B ====
Pos	Team	Pld	W	L	GF	GA	GD	PF	PA	PD	Pts	Qualification
1	China	3	3	0	30	1	+29	650	357	+293	**3**	Advance to quarter-finals
2	Chinese Taipei	3	2	1	20	12	+8	594	487	+107	**2**	Advance to quarter-finals
3	Spain	3	1	2	10	22	−12	441	609	−168	**1**	
4	Australia	3	0	3	3	28	−25	373	605	−232	**0**	

Source: Tournament software
Rules for classification: Tiebreakers

8 May 2022
09:00 UTC+7

**Chinese Taipei**	4–1	**Spain**
Report

Impact Arena Court 1, Nonthaburi

8 May 2022
19:00 UTC+7

**China**	5–0	**Australia**
Report

Impact Arena Court 4, Nonthaburi

9 May 2022
19:00 UTC+7

**China**	5–0	**Spain**
Report

Impact Arena Court 3, Nonthaburi

9 May 2022
19:00 UTC+7

**Chinese Taipei**	5–0	**Australia**
Report

Impact Arena Court 4, Nonthaburi

10 May 2022
19:00 UTC+7

**China**	5–0	**Chinese Taipei**
Report

Impact Arena Court 1, Nonthaburi

10 May 2022
19:00 UTC+7

**Spain**	4–1	**Australia**
Report

Impact Arena Court 3, Nonthaburi

==== Group C ====
Pos	Team	Pld	W	L	GF	GA	GD	PF	PA	PD	Pts	Qualification
1	Thailand (H)	3	3	0	29	7	+22	726	461	+265	**3**	Advance to quarter-finals
2	Denmark	3	2	1	21	14	+7	627	528	+99	**2**	Advance to quarter-finals
3	Malaysia	3	1	2	17	16	+1	565	549	+16	**1**	
4	Egypt	3	0	3	0	30	−30	250	630	−380	**0**	

Source: Tournament software
Rules for classification: Tiebreakers
(H) Host

8 May 2022
14:00 UTC+7

**Denmark**	3–2	**Malaysia**
Report

Impact Arena Court 1, Nonthaburi

8 May 2022
14:00 UTC+7

**Thailand**	5–0	**Egypt**
Report

Impact Arena Court 4, Nonthaburi

9 May 2022
14:00 UTC+7

**Thailand**	4–1	**Malaysia**
Report

Impact Arena Court 1, Nonthaburi

9 May 2022
14:00 UTC+7

**Denmark**	5–0	**Egypt**
Report

Impact Arena Court 4, Nonthaburi

10 May 2022
19:00 UTC+7

**Thailand**	5–0	**Denmark**
Report

Impact Arena Court 2, Nonthaburi

10 May 2022
19:00 UTC+7

**Malaysia**	5–0	**Egypt**
Report

Impact Arena Court 4, Nonthaburi

==== Group D ====
Pos	Team	Pld	W	L	GF	GA	GD	PF	PA	PD	Pts	Qualification
1	South Korea	3	3	0	29	4	+25	677	465	+212	**3**	Advance to quarter-finals
2	India	3	2	1	17	16	+1	577	580	−3	**2**	Advance to quarter-finals
3	Canada	3	1	2	16	22	−6	666	727	−61	**1**	
4	United States	3	0	3	7	27	−20	535	683	−148	**0**	

Source: Tournament software
Rules for classification: Tiebreakers

8 May 2022
09:00 UTC+7

**South Korea**	5–0	**United States**
Report

Impact Arena Court 4, Nonthaburi

8 May 2022
19:00 UTC+7

**India**	4–1	**Canada**
Report

Impact Arena Court 3, Nonthaburi

10 May 2022
09:00 UTC+7

**India**	4–1	**United States**
Report

Impact Arena Court 3, Nonthaburi

10 May 2022
09:00 UTC+7

**South Korea**	4–1	**Canada**
Report

Impact Arena Court 4, Nonthaburi

11 May 2022
09:00 UTC+7

**South Korea**	5–0	**India**
Report

Impact Arena Court 2, Nonthaburi

11 May 2022
09:00 UTC+7

**Canada**	3–2	**United States**
Report

Impact Arena Court 4, Nonthaburi

=== Knockout stage ===
The quarter and semi-finals were held between 12 and 13 May 2022 while the finals was held on 14 May 2022. Below is the bracket for the knockout round of the tournament, teams in bold denote match winners.

The draw was conducted on 11 May 2022, after the last match of the group stage.

Quarter-finals
**Japan**	**3**
Chinese Taipei	0
**South Korea**	**3**
Denmark	0
India	0
**Thailand**	**3**
Indonesia	0
**China**	**3**

Semi-finals
Japan	0
**South Korea**	**3**
Thailand	0
**China**	**3**

Final
**South Korea**	**3**
China	2

==== Quarter-finals ====
12 May 2022
09:00 UTC+7

**Japan**	3–0	**Chinese Taipei**
Report

Impact Arena Court 2, Nonthaburi

12 May 2022
14:00 UTC+7

**South Korea**	3–0	**Denmark**
Report

Impact Arena Court 3, Nonthaburi

12 May 2022
14:00 UTC+7

**India**	0–3	**Thailand**
Report

Impact Arena Court 1, Nonthaburi

12 May 2022
09:00 UTC+7

**Indonesia**	0–3	**China**
Report

Impact Arena Court 1, Nonthaburi

==== Semi-finals ====
13 May 2022
12:00 UTC+7

**Japan**	0–3	**South Korea**
Report

Impact Arena Court 2, Nonthaburi

13 May 2022
12:00 UTC+7

**Thailand**	0–3	**China**
Report

Impact Arena Court 1, Nonthaburi

==== Final ====
14 May 2022
13:00 UTC+7

**South Korea**	3–2	**China**
Report

Impact Arena Court 1, Nonthaburi

2022 Uber Cup champions

**South Korea**
**Second title**

=== Final ranking ===
Pos	Team	Pld	W	L	Pts	MD	GD	PD	Final result
1st place, gold medalist(s)	South Korea	6	6	0	6	+20	+33	+236	Champions
2nd place, silver medalist(s)	China	6	5	1	5	+20	+38	+374	Runners-up
3rd place, bronze medalist(s)	Japan	5	4	1	4	+13	+24	+273	Eliminated in semi-finals
3rd place, bronze medalist(s)	Thailand	5	4	1	4	+13	+22	+269	Eliminated in semi-finals
5	Indonesia	4	2	2	2	+4	+5	+37	Eliminated in quarter-finals
6	Chinese Taipei	4	2	2	2	0	+5	+63	Eliminated in quarter-finals
7	Denmark	4	2	2	2	–2	+4	+82	Eliminated in quarter-finals
8	India	4	2	2	2	–2	–4	–41	Eliminated in quarter-finals
9	Malaysia	3	1	2	1	+1	+1	+16	Eliminated in group stage
10	Canada	3	1	2	1	–5	–6	–61	Eliminated in group stage
11	Spain	3	1	2	1	–5	–12	–168	Eliminated in group stage
12	Germany	3	1	2	1	–9	–17	–149	Eliminated in group stage
13	United States	3	0	3	0	–9	–20	–148	Eliminated in group stage
14	France	3	0	3	0	–11	–18	–171	Eliminated in group stage
15	Australia	3	0	3	0	−13	−25	−232	Eliminated in group stage
16	Egypt	3	0	3	0	−15	−30	−380	Eliminated in group stage
