= 2022 Uber Cup knockout stage =

Badminton championships

The knockout stage for the 2022 Uber Cup in Bangkok, Thailand, began on 12 May 2022 with the quarter-finals and will end on 14 May with the final tie.

== Qualified teams ==
The top two placed teams from each of the eight groups will qualify for this stage.

Group	Winners	Runners-up
A	Japan	Indonesia
B	China	Chinese Taipei
C	Thailand	Denmark
D	South Korea	India

== Bracket ==
The draw was conducted on 11 May 2022, after the last match of the group stage.

Quarter-finals
Japan	3
Chinese Taipei	0
South Korea	3
Denmark	0
India	0
Thailand	3
Indonesia	0
China	3

Semi-finals
Japan	0
South Korea	3
Thailand	0
China	3

Final
South Korea	3
China	2

== Quarter-finals ==
=== Japan vs Chinese Taipei ===
Japan
3
Impact Arena Court 2
12 May 2022 09:00 UTC+7

Chinese Taipei
0

			1	2	3
1	(Japan) (Chinese Taipei)	Akane Yamaguchi; Tai Tzu-ying	21; 10	19; 21	21; 19
2	(Japan) (Chinese Taipei)	Yuki Fukushima / Sayaka Hirota; Hsu Ya-ching / Lin Wan-ching	19; 21	21; 7	21; 14
3	(Japan) (Chinese Taipei)	Nozomi Okuhara; Hsu Wen-chi	15; 21	21; 13	21; 9
4	(Japan) (Chinese Taipei)	Mayu Matsumoto / Wakana Nagahara; Lee Chih-chen / Teng Chun-hsun				not played
5	(Japan) (Chinese Taipei)	Sayaka Takahashi; Sung Shuo-yun				not played

=== South Korea vs Denmark ===
South Korea
3
Impact Arena Court 3
12 May 2022 14:00 UTC+7

Denmark
0

			1	2	3
1	(South Korea) (Denmark)	An Se-young; Mia Blichfeldt	18; 21	21; 15	21; 18
2	(South Korea) (Denmark)	Lee So-hee / Shin Seung-chan; Maiken Fruergaard / Sara Thygesen	21; 23	21; 16	21; 19
3	(South Korea) (Denmark)	Kim Ga-eun; Line Christophersen	10; 21	21; 9	21; 16
4	(South Korea) (Denmark)	Kim Hye-jeong / Kong Hee-yong; Alexandra Bøje / Amalie Magelund				not played
5	(South Korea) (Denmark)	Sim Yu-jin; Line Kjærsfeldt				not played

=== India vs Thailand ===
India
0
Impact Arena Court 1
12 May 2022 14:00 UTC+7

Thailand
3

			1	2	3
1	(India) (Thailand)	P. V. Sindhu; Ratchanok Intanon	21; 18	17; 21	12; 21
2	(India) (Thailand)	Shruti Mishra / Simran Singhi; Jongkolphan Kititharakul / Rawinda Prajongjai	16; 21	13; 21
3	(India) (Thailand)	Aakarshi Kashyap; Pornpawee Chochuwong	16; 21	11; 21
4	(India) (Thailand)	Tanisha Crasto / Treesa Jolly; Benyapa Aimsaard / Nuntakarn Aimsaard				not played
5	(India) (Thailand)	Ashmita Chaliha; Busanan Ongbamrungphan				not played

=== Indonesia vs China ===
Indonesia
0
Impact Arena Court 1
12 May 2022 09:00 UTC+7

China
3

			1	2	3
1	(Indonesia) (China)	Komang Ayu Cahya Dewi; Chen Yufei	12; 21	11; 21
2	(Indonesia) (China)	Febriana Dwipuji Kusuma / Amalia Cahaya Pratiwi; Chen Qingchen / Jia Yifan	19; 21	16; 21
3	(Indonesia) (China)	Bilqis Prasista; He Bingjiao	21; 19	18; 21	7; 21
4	(Indonesia) (China)	Nita Violina Marwah / Lanny Tria Mayasari; Huang Dongping / Zheng Yu				not played
5	(Indonesia) (China)	Siti Sarah Azzahra; Wang Zhiyi				not played

== Semi-finals ==
=== Japan vs South Korea ===
Japan
0
Impact Arena Court 2
13 May 2022 12:00 UTC+7

South Korea
3

			1	2	3
1	(Japan) (South Korea)	Akane Yamaguchi; An Se-young	21; 15	18; 21	18; 21
2	(Japan) (South Korea)	Nami Matsuyama / Chiharu Shida; Lee So-hee / Shin Seung-chan	16; 21	17; 21
3	(Japan) (South Korea)	Nozomi Okuhara; Kim Ga-eun	12; 21	21; 11	16; 21
4	(Japan) (South Korea)	Yuki Fukushima / Mayu Matsumoto; Kim Hye-jeong / Kong Hee-yong				not played
5	(Japan) (South Korea)	Sayaka Takahashi; Sim Yu-jin				not played

=== Thailand vs China ===
Thailand
0
Impact Arena Court 1
13 May 2022 12:00 UTC+7

China
3

			1	2	3
1	(Thailand) (China)	Ratchanok Intanon; Chen Yufei	18; 21	12; 21
2	(Thailand) (China)	Jongkolphan Kititharakul / Rawinda Prajongjai; Chen Qingchen / Jia Yifan	21; 17	13; 21	15; 21
3	(Thailand) (China)	Pornpawee Chochuwong; He Bingjiao	15; 21	15; 21
4	(Thailand) (China)	Benyapa Aimsaard / Nuntakarn Aimsaard; Huang Dongping / Li Wenmei				not played
5	(Thailand) (China)	Busanan Ongbamrungphan; Wang Zhiyi				not played

== Final ==
South Korea
3
Impact Arena Court 1
14 May 2022 13:00 UTC+7

China
2

			1	2	3
1	(South Korea) (China)	An Se-young; Chen Yufei	21; 17	15; 21	20; 22
2	(South Korea) (China)	Lee So-hee / Shin Seung-chan; Chen Qingchen / Jia Yifan	12; 21	21; 18	21; 18
3	(South Korea) (China)	Kim Ga-eun; He Bingjiao	12; 21	13; 21
4	(South Korea) (China)	Kim Hye-jeong / Kong Hee-yong; Huang Dongping / Li Wenmei	22; 20	21; 17
5	(South Korea) (China)	Sim Yu-jin; Wang Zhiyi	28; 26	18; 21	21; 8
