= 2022 Thomas Cup group stage =

Badminton Team Tournament in Bangkok

The 2022 Thomas Cup group stage was held at the Impact Arena in Bangkok, Thailand, from 8 to 11 May 2022.

The group stage was first stage of the tournament where only the two highest-placing teams in each of the four groups advanced to the knockout stage.

== Draw ==
The original draw for the tournament was conducted on 1 April 2022, at 15:00 ICT, at Arnoma Grand Bangkok in Bangkok, Thailand. The 16 teams will be drawn into four groups each containing four teams and were allocated to four pots based on the World Team Rankings of 22 February 2022.

| Pot 1 | Pot 2 | Pot 3 | Pot 4 |
|---|---|---|---|
| Indonesia; Japan; Denmark; Chinese Taipei | India; Malaysia; China; South Korea | Thailand; France; England; Germany | Canada; Singapore; Algeria; New Zealand |

=== Group composition ===
Group
| Group A | Group B | Group C | Group D |
|---|---|---|---|
| Indonesia; South Korea; Thailand (Host); Singapore | Denmark; China; France; Algeria | Chinese Taipei; India; Germany; Canada | Japan; Malaysia; England; ~~New Zealand~~^{1} United States^{1} |

- ^1 New Zealand team has withdrawn from the tournament and will be replaced by United States team

== Group A ==
| Pos | Team | Pld | W | L | GF | GA | GD | PF | PA | PD | Pts | Qualification |
|---|---|---|---|---|---|---|---|---|---|---|---|---|
| 1 | Indonesia | 3 | 3 | 0 | 25 | 12 | +13 | 717 | 629 | +88 | 3 | Advance to quarter-finals |
| 2 | South Korea | 3 | 2 | 1 | 19 | 18 | +1 | 633 | 655 | −22 | 2 | Advance to quarter-finals |
| 3 | Thailand (H) | 3 | 1 | 2 | 14 | 21 | −7 | 624 | 650 | −26 | 1 | |
| 4 | Singapore | 3 | 0 | 3 | 15 | 22 | −7 | 650 | 690 | −40 | 0 | |

Source: Tournament software
Rules for classification: Tiebreakers
(H) Host

=== Indonesia vs Singapore ===
Indonesia
4
Impact Arena Court 2
8 May 2022, 14:00 UTC+7

Singapore
1

| | | | 1 | 2 | 3 |
|---|---|---|---|---|---|
| 1 | (Indonesia) (Singapore) | Anthony Sinisuka Ginting; Loh Kean Yew | 13; 21 | 14; 21 |
| 2 | (Indonesia) (Singapore) | Fajar Alfian / Muhammad Rian Ardianto; Terry Hee / Loh Kean Hean | 21; 14 | 19; 21 | 21; 12 |
| 3 | (Indonesia) (Singapore) | Jonatan Christie; Jason Teh | 21; 19 | 21; 13 |
| 4 | (Indonesia) (Singapore) | Muhammad Shohibul Fikri / Bagas Maulana; Danny Bawa Chrisnanta / Andy Kwek | 24; 22 | 21; 14 |
| 5 | (Indonesia) (Singapore) | Shesar Hiren Rhustavito; Joel Koh | 21; 16 | 21; 7 |

=== South Korea vs Thailand ===
South Korea
3
Impact Arena Court 1
8 May 2022, 19:00 UTC+7

Thailand
2

| | | | 1 | 2 | 3 |
|---|---|---|---|---|---|
| 1 | (South Korea) (Thailand) | Heo Kwang-hee; Kunlavut Vitidsarn | 14; 21 | 6; 21 |
| 2 | (South Korea) (Thailand) | Kang Min-hyuk / Seo Seung-jae; Chaloempon Charoenkitamorn / Nanthakarn Yordphaisong | 22; 20 | 21; 15 |
| 3 | (South Korea) (Thailand) | Jeon Hyeok-jin; Kantaphon Wangcharoen | 21; 12 | 21; 12 |
| 4 | (South Korea) (Thailand) | Choi Sol-gyu / Kim Won-ho; Peeratchai Sukphun / Pakkapon Teeraratsakul | 21; 17 | 21; 9 |
| 5 | (South Korea) (Thailand) | Lee Yun-gyu; Sitthikom Thammasin | 10; 21 | 9; 21 |

=== Indonesia vs Thailand ===
Indonesia
4
Impact Arena Court 1
9 May 2022, 19:00 UTC+7

Thailand
1

| | | | 1 | 2 | 3 |
|---|---|---|---|---|---|
| 1 | (Indonesia) (Thailand) | Anthony Sinisuka Ginting; Kunlavut Vitidsarn | 12; 21 | 21; 15 | 9; 21 |
| 2 | (Indonesia) (Thailand) | Mohammad Ahsan / Hendra Setiawan; Chaloempon Charoenkitamorn / Nanthakarn Yordphaisong | 21; 12 | 26; 28 | 21; 11 |
| 3 | (Indonesia) (Thailand) | Jonatan Christie; Kantaphon Wangcharoen | 22; 20 | 21; 16 |
| 4 | (Indonesia) (Thailand) | Bagas Maulana / Kevin Sanjaya Sukamuljo; Peeratchai Sukphun / Pakkapon Teeraratsakul | 24; 22 | 21; 11 |
| 5 | (Indonesia) (Thailand) | Shesar Hiren Rhustavito; Sitthikom Thammasin | 21; 19 | 21; 14 |

=== South Korea vs Singapore ===
South Korea
3
Impact Arena Court 2
9 May 2022, 19:00 UTC+7

Singapore
2

| | | | 1 | 2 | 3 |
|---|---|---|---|---|---|
| 1 | (South Korea) (Singapore) | Heo Kwang-hee; Loh Kean Yew | 14; 21 | 12; 21 |
| 2 | (South Korea) (Singapore) | Kang Min-hyuk / Seo Seung-jae; Terry Hee / Loh Kean Hean | 15; 21 | 21; 17 | 21; 19 |
| 3 | (South Korea) (Singapore) | Jeon Hyeok-jin; Jason Teh | 14; 21 | 21; 13 | 21; 14 |
| 4 | (South Korea) (Singapore) | Choi Sol-gyu / Kim Won-ho; Wesley Koh / Junsuke Kubo | 21; 14 | 21; 13 |
| 5 | (South Korea) (Singapore) | Lee Yun-gyu; Joel Koh | 15; 21 | 21; 10 | 11; 21 |

=== Indonesia vs South Korea ===
Indonesia
3
Impact Arena Court 1
11 May 2022, 14:00 UTC+7

South Korea
2

| | | | 1 | 2 | 3 |
|---|---|---|---|---|---|
| 1 | (Indonesia) (South Korea) | Anthony Sinisuka Ginting; Heo Kwang-hee | 16; 21 | 21; 15 | 14; 21 |
| 2 | (Indonesia) (South Korea) | Mohammad Ahsan / Kevin Sanjaya Sukamuljo; Kang Min-hyuk / Seo Seung-jae | 18; 21 | 21; 13 | 12; 21 |
| 3 | (Indonesia) (South Korea) | Shesar Hiren Rhustavito; Jeon Hyeok-jin | 19; 21 | 21; 8 | 21; 10 |
| 4 | (Indonesia) (South Korea) | Fajar Alfian / Muhammad Rian Ardianto; Jin Yong / Na Sung-seung | 23; 21 | 21; 16 |
| 5 | (Indonesia) (South Korea) | Syabda Perkasa Belawa; Lee Yun-gyu | 21; 14 | 11; 21 | 21; 16 |

=== Thailand vs Singapore ===
Thailand
3
Impact Arena Court 3
11 May 2022, 14:00 UTC+7

Singapore
2

| | | | 1 | 2 | 3 |
|---|---|---|---|---|---|
| 1 | (Thailand) (Singapore) | Khosit Phetpradab; Loh Kean Yew | 15; 21 | 18; 21 |
| 2 | (Thailand) (Singapore) | Tanadon Punpanich / Wachirawit Sothon; Terry Hee / Loh Kean Hean | 21; 16 | 18; 21 | 15; 21 |
| 3 | (Thailand) (Singapore) | Adulrach Namkul; Jason Teh | 23; 21 | 14; 21 | 21; 17 |
| 4 | (Thailand) (Singapore) | Peeratchai Sukphun / Pakkapon Teeraratsakul; Danny Bawa Chrisnanta / Andy Kwek | 21; 14 | 21; 18 |
| 5 | (Thailand) (Singapore) | Panitchaphon Teeraratsakul; Joel Koh | 14; 21 | 23; 21 | 21; 11 |

== Group B ==
| Pos | Team | Pld | W | L | GF | GA | GD | PF | PA | PD | Pts | Qualification |
|---|---|---|---|---|---|---|---|---|---|---|---|---|
| 1 | Denmark | 3 | 3 | 0 | 27 | 6 | +21 | 659 | 473 | +186 | 3 | Advance to quarter-finals |
| 2 | China | 3 | 2 | 1 | 26 | 9 | +17 | 698 | 543 | +155 | 2 | Advance to quarter-finals |
| 3 | France | 3 | 1 | 2 | 12 | 20 | −8 | 561 | 561 | 0 | 1 | |
| 4 | Algeria | 3 | 0 | 3 | 0 | 30 | −30 | 289 | 630 | −341 | 0 | |

Source: Tournament software
Rules for classification: Tiebreakers

=== China vs France ===
China
5
Impact Arena Court 1
9 May 2022, 9:00 UTC+7

France
0

| | | | 1 | 2 | 3 |
|---|---|---|---|---|---|
| 1 | (China) (France) | Lu Guangzu; Christo Popov | 25; 23 | 24; 26 | 21; 15 |
| 2 | (China) (France) | Zhao Junpeng; Arnaud Merklé | 21; 19 | 21; 10 |
| 3 | (China) (France) | He Jiting / Zhou Haodong; Fabien Delrue / William Villeger | 21; 17 | 21; 15 |
| 4 | (China) (France) | Li Shifeng; Alex Lanier | 21; 14 | 21; 14 |
| 5 | (China) (France) | Liu Yuchen / Ou Xuanyi; Christo Popov / Toma Junior Popov | 20; 22 | 21; 16 | 21; 16 |

=== Denmark vs Algeria ===
Denmark
5
Impact Arena Court 4
9 May 2022, 9:00 UTC+7

Algeria
0

| | | | 1 | 2 | 3 |
|---|---|---|---|---|---|
| 1 | (Denmark) (Algeria) | Viktor Axelsen; Youcef Sabri Medel | 21; 9 | 21; 11 |
| 2 | (Denmark) (Algeria) | Anders Antonsen; Mohamed Abderrahime Belarbi | 21; 5 | 21; 8 |
| 3 | (Denmark) (Algeria) | Hans-Kristian Vittinghus; Adel Hamek | 21; 13 | 21; 14 |
| 4 | (Denmark) (Algeria) | Mathias Christiansen / Anders Skaarup Rasmussen; Koceila Mammeri / Youcef Sabri Medel | 21; 15 | 21; 10 |
| 5 | (Denmark) (Algeria) | Jeppe Bay / Lasse Mølhede; Mohamed Abderrahime Belarbi / Adel Hamek | 21; 6 | 21; 8 |

=== Denmark vs France ===
Denmark
5
Impact Arena Court 2
10 May 2022, 14:00 UTC+7

France
0

| | | | 1 | 2 | 3 |
|---|---|---|---|---|---|
| 1 | (Denmark) (France) | Viktor Axelsen; Toma Junior Popov | 21; 8 | 21; 11 |
| 2 | (Denmark) (France) | Anders Antonsen; Christo Popov | 21; 12 | 21; 13 |
| 3 | (Denmark) (France) | Mathias Christiansen / Frederik Søgaard; Fabien Delrue / William Villeger | 21; 17 | 21; 16 |
| 4 | (Denmark) (France) | Rasmus Gemke; Arnaud Merklé | 21; 17 | 21; 13 |
| 5 | (Denmark) (France) | Kim Astrup / Anders Skaarup Rasmussen; Christo Popov / Toma Junior Popov | 21; 18 | 21; 19 |

=== China vs Algeria ===
China
5
Impact Arena Court 3
10 May 2022, 14:00 UTC+7

Algeria
0

| | | | 1 | 2 | 3 |
|---|---|---|---|---|---|
| 1 | (China) (Algeria) | Zhao Junpeng; Koceila Mammeri | 21; 11 | 21; 15 |
| 2 | (China) (Algeria) | Li Shifeng; Mohamed Abderrahime Belarbi | 21; 7 | 21; 10 |
| 3 | (China) (Algeria) | Ren Xiangyu / Tan Qiang; Sifeddine Larbaoui / Mohamed Abdelaziz Ouchefoun | 21; 4 | 21; 4 |
| 4 | (China) (Algeria) | Weng Hongyang; Adel Hamek | 21; 11 | 21; 10 |
| 5 | (China) (Algeria) | Liu Yuchen / Ou Xuanyi; Koceila Mammeri / Youcef Sabri Medel | 21; 8 | 21; 17 |

=== Denmark vs China ===
Denmark
3
Impact Arena Court 1
11 May 2022, 19:00 UTC+7

China
2

| | | | 1 | 2 | 3 |
|---|---|---|---|---|---|
| 1 | (Denmark) (China) | Viktor Axelsen; Lu Guangzu | 17; 21 | 21; 10 | 21; 9 |
| 2 | (Denmark) (China) | Kim Astrup / Mathias Christiansen; Liu Yuchen / Ou Xuanyi | 16; 21 | 11; 21 |
| 3 | (Denmark) (China) | Anders Antonsen; Li Shifeng | 21; 15 | 19; 21 | 13; 21 |
| 4 | (Denmark) (China) | Anders Skaarup Rasmussen / Frederik Søgaard; He Jiting / Zhou Haodong | 21; 16 | 21; 17 |
| 5 | (Denmark) (China) | Hans-Kristian Vittinghus; Weng Hongyang | 16; 21 | 21; 19 | 21; 18 |

=== France vs Algeria ===
France
5
Impact Arena Court 4
11 May 2022, 19:00 UTC+7

Algeria
0

| | | | 1 | 2 | 3 |
|---|---|---|---|---|---|
| 1 | (France) (Algeria) | Toma Junior Popov; Mohamed Abderrahime Belarbi | 21; 10 | 21; 5 |
| 2 | (France) (Algeria) | Arnaud Merklé; Adel Hamek | 21; 10 | 21; 8 |
| 3 | (France) (Algeria) | Alex Lanier; Sifeddine Larbaoui | 21; 5 | 21; 8 |
| 4 | (France) (Algeria) | Christo Popov / Toma Junior Popov; Koceila Mammeri / Youcef Sabri Medel | 21; 17 | 21; 17 |
| 5 | (France) (Algeria) | Fabien Delrue / William Villeger; Mohamed Abderrahime Belarbi / Adel Hamek | 21; 7 | 21; 6 |

== Group C ==
| Pos | Team | Pld | W | L | GF | GA | GD | PF | PA | PD | Pts | Qualification |
|---|---|---|---|---|---|---|---|---|---|---|---|---|
| 1 | Chinese Taipei | 3 | 3 | 0 | 27 | 11 | +16 | 754 | 635 | +119 | 3 | Advance to quarter-finals |
| 2 | India | 3 | 2 | 1 | 26 | 11 | +15 | 737 | 598 | +139 | 2 | Advance to quarter-finals |
| 3 | Germany | 3 | 1 | 2 | 14 | 24 | −10 | 641 | 719 | −78 | 1 | |
| 4 | Canada | 3 | 0 | 3 | 7 | 28 | −21 | 525 | 705 | −180 | 0 | |

Source: Tournament software
Rules for classification: Tiebreakers

=== India vs Germany ===
India
5
Impact Arena Court 2
8 May 2022, 9:00 UTC+7

Germany
0

| | | | 1 | 2 | 3 |
|---|---|---|---|---|---|
| 1 | (India) (Germany) | Lakshya Sen; Max Weißkirchen | 21; 16 | 21; 13 |
| 2 | (India) (Germany) | Satwiksairaj Rankireddy / Chirag Shetty; Jones Ralfy Jansen / Marvin Seidel | 21; 15 | 10; 21 | 21; 13 |
| 3 | (India) (Germany) | Srikanth Kidambi; Kai Schäfer | 18; 21 | 21; 9 | 21; 11 |
| 4 | (India) (Germany) | Arjun M.R. / Dhruv Kapila; Bjarne Geiss / Jan Colin Völker | 25; 23 | 21; 15 |
| 5 | (India) (Germany) | Prannoy H. S. Matthias Kicklitz | 21; 9 | 21; 9 |

=== Chinese Taipei vs Canada ===
Chinese Taipei
5
Impact Arena Court 3
8 May 2022, 14:00 UTC+7

Canada
0

| | | | 1 | 2 | 3 |
|---|---|---|---|---|---|
| 1 | (Chinese Taipei) (Canada) | Chou Tien-chen; Brian Yang | 21; 19 | 21; 12 |
| 2 | (Chinese Taipei) (Canada) | Lee Yang / Wang Chi-lin; Adam Dong / Nyl Yakura | 21; 14 | 21; 11 |
| 3 | (Chinese Taipei) (Canada) | Wang Tzu-wei; Jason Ho-Shue | 21; 15 | 21; 9 |
| 4 | (Chinese Taipei) (Canada) | Su Ching-heng / Ye Hong-wei; Victor Lai / Kevin Lee | 21; 13 | 21; 16 |
| 5 | (Chinese Taipei) (Canada) | Lu Chia-hung; B. R. Sankeerth | 21; 18 | 16; 21 | 21; 5 |

=== Chinese Taipei vs Germany ===
Chinese Taipei
5
Impact Arena Court 2
9 May 2022, 14:00 UTC+7

Germany
0

| | | | 1 | 2 | 3 |
|---|---|---|---|---|---|
| 1 | (Chinese Taipei) (Germany) | Chou Tien-chen; Max Weißkirchen | 20; 22 | 21; 15 | 21; 14 |
| 2 | (Chinese Taipei) (Germany) | Lee Yang / Wang Chi-lin; Marvin Seidel / Jan Colin Völker | 21; 16 | 21; 18 |
| 3 | (Chinese Taipei) (Germany) | Wang Tzu-wei; Kai Schäfer | 15; 21 | 21; 18 | 21; 16 |
| 4 | (Chinese Taipei) (Germany) | Lu Ching-yao / Yang Po-han; Bjarne Geiss / Daniel Hess | 19; 21 | 21; 11 | 21; 12 |
| 5 | (Chinese Taipei) (Germany) | Liao Jhuo-fu; Samuel Hsiao | 21; 17 | 14; 21 | 21; 15 |

=== India vs Canada ===
India
5
Impact Arena Court 3
9 May 2022, 14:00 UTC+7

Canada
0

| | | | 1 | 2 | 3 |
|---|---|---|---|---|---|
| 1 | (India) (Canada) | Srikanth Kidambi; Brian Yang | 20; 22 | 21; 11 | 21; 15 |
| 2 | (India) (Canada) | Satwiksairaj Rankireddy / Chirag Shetty; Jason Ho-Shue / Kevin Lee | 21; 12 | 21; 11 |
| 3 | (India) (Canada) | Prannoy H. S. B. R. Sankeerth | 21; 15 | 21; 12 |
| 4 | (India) (Canada) | Krishna Prasad Garaga / Vishnuvardhan Goud Panjala; Adam Dong / Nyl Yakura | 21; 15 | 21; 11 |
| 5 | (India) (Canada) | Priyanshu Rajawat; Victor Lai | 21; 13 | 20; 22 | 21; 14 |

=== Chinese Taipei vs India ===
Chinese Taipei
3
Impact Arena Court 2
11 May 2022, 14:00 UTC+7

India
2

| | | | 1 | 2 | 3 |
|---|---|---|---|---|---|
| 1 | (Chinese Taipei) (India) | Chou Tien-chen; Lakshya Sen | 21; 19 | 13; 21 | 21; 17 |
| 2 | (Chinese Taipei) (India) | Lee Yang / Wang Chi-lin; Satwiksairaj Rankireddy / Chirag Shetty | 21; 11 | 21; 19 |
| 3 | (Chinese Taipei) (India) | Wang Tzu-wei; Srikanth Kidambi | 19; 21 | 16; 21 |
| 4 | (Chinese Taipei) (India) | Lu Ching-yao / Yang Po-han; Arjun M.R. / Dhruv Kapila | 21; 17 | 19; 21 | 21; 19 |
| 5 | (Chinese Taipei) (India) | Lu Chia-hung; Prannoy H. S. | 18; 21 | 21; 17 | 18; 21 |

=== Germany vs Canada ===
Germany
3
Impact Arena Court 4
11 May 2022, 14:00 UTC+7

Canada
2

| | | | 1 | 2 | 3 |
|---|---|---|---|---|---|
| 1 | (Germany) (Canada) | Max Weißkirchen; Brian Yang | 21; 16 | 13; 21 | 14; 21 |
| 2 | (Germany) (Canada) | Mark Lamsfuß / Marvin Seidel; Adam Dong / Nyl Yakura | 21; 11 | 21; 17 |
| 3 | (Germany) (Canada) | Kai Schäfer; Jason Ho-Shue | 21; 8 | 21; 18 |
| 4 | (Germany) (Canada) | Jones Ralfy Jansen / Jan Colin Völker; B. R. Sankeerth / Kevin Lee | 21; 19 | 18; 21 | 16; 21 |
| 5 | (Germany) (Canada) | Samuel Hsiao; Victor Lai | 21; 14 | 21; 12 |

== Group D ==
| Pos | Team | Pld | W | L | GF | GA | GD | PF | PA | PD | Pts | Qualification |
|---|---|---|---|---|---|---|---|---|---|---|---|---|
| 1 | Malaysia | 3 | 3 | 0 | 27 | 6 | +21 | 663 | 503 | +160 | 3 | Advance to quarter-finals |
| 2 | Japan | 3 | 2 | 1 | 24 | 9 | +15 | 646 | 460 | +186 | 2 | Advance to quarter-finals |
| 3 | England | 3 | 1 | 2 | 13 | 22 | −9 | 537 | 626 | −89 | 1 | |
| 4 | United States | 3 | 0 | 3 | 2 | 29 | −27 | 377 | 634 | −257 | 0 | |

Source: Tournament software
Rules for classification: Tiebreakers

=== Malaysia vs England ===
Malaysia
5
Impact Arena Court 2
9 May 2022, 9:00 UTC+7

England
0

| | | | 1 | 2 | 3 |
|---|---|---|---|---|---|
| 1 | (Malaysia) (England) | Lee Zii Jia; Toby Penty | 21; 10 | 21; 15 |
| 2 | (Malaysia) (England) | Aaron Chia / Soh Wooi Yik; Ben Lane / Sean Vendy | 19; 21 | 21; 15 | 21; 16 |
| 3 | (Malaysia) (England) | Ng Tze Yong; Johnnie Torjussen | 21; 16 | 19; 21 | 21; 11 |
| 4 | (Malaysia) (England) | Goh Sze Fei / Nur Izzuddin; Rory Easton / Zach Russ | 21; 13 | 21; 9 |
| 5 | (Malaysia) (England) | Leong Jun Hao; Cholan Kayan | 21; 11 | 21; 18 |

=== Japan vs United States ===
Japan
5
Impact Arena Court 3
9 May 2022, 9:00 UTC+7

United States
0

| | | | 1 | 2 | 3 |
|---|---|---|---|---|---|
| 1 | (Japan) (United States) | Kenta Nishimoto; Enrico Asuncion | 21; 13 | 21; 12 |
| 2 | (Japan) (United States) | Kodai Naraoka; Don Henley Averia | 21; 8 | 21; 6 |
| 3 | (Japan) (United States) | Riku Hatano; William Hu | 21; 12 | 21; 13 |
| 4 | (Japan) (United States) | Keiichiro Matsui / Yoshinori Takeuchi; Adrian Mar King-Sun / Henry Tang | 21; 15 | 21; 9 |
| 5 | (Japan) (United States) | Akira Koga / Taichi Saito; Enrico Asuncion / William Hu | 21; 8 | 21; 12 |

=== Japan vs England ===
Japan
5
Impact Arena Court 1
10 May 2022, 14:00 UTC+7

England
0

| | | | 1 | 2 | 3 |
|---|---|---|---|---|---|
| 1 | (Japan) (England) | Kento Momota; Toby Penty | 21; 18 | 21; 11 |
| 2 | (Japan) (England) | Takuro Hoki / Yuta Watanabe; Ben Lane / Sean Vendy | 12; 21 | 21; 11 | 21; 9 |
| 3 | (Japan) (England) | Kanta Tsuneyama; Johnnie Torjussen | 13; 21 | 21; 12 | 21; 9 |
| 4 | (Japan) (England) | Akira Koga / Taichi Saito; Callum Hemming / Steven Stallwood | 21; 13 | 21; 9 |
| 5 | (Japan) (England) | Kodai Naraoka; Sid Palakkal | 21; 6 | 21; 7 |

=== Malaysia vs United States ===
Malaysia
5
Impact Arena Court 4
10 May 2022, 14:00 UTC+7

United States
0

| | | | 1 | 2 | 3 |
|---|---|---|---|---|---|
| 1 | (Malaysia) (United States) | Liew Daren; Enrico Asuncion | 21; 13 | 21; 16 |
| 2 | (Malaysia) (United States) | Ng Tze Yong; Don Henley Averia | 21; 11 | 21; 9 |
| 3 | (Malaysia) (United States) | Aidil Sholeh; William Hu | 21; 16 | 21; 17 |
| 4 | (Malaysia) (United States) | Chia Wei Jie / Goh Sze Fei; Adrian Mar King-Sun / Henry Tang | 21; 12 | 21; 8 |
| 5 | (Malaysia) (United States) | Ong Yew Sin / Teo Ee Yi; Enrico Asuncion / William Hu | 21; 16 | 21; 8 |

=== Japan vs Malaysia ===
Japan
2
Impact Arena Court 2
11 May 2022, 19:00 UTC+7

Malaysia
3

| | | | 1 | 2 | 3 |
|---|---|---|---|---|---|
| 1 | (Japan) (Malaysia) | Kento Momota; Lee Zii Jia | 17; 21 | 8; 21 |
| 2 | (Japan) (Malaysia) | Takuro Hoki / Yugo Kobayashi; Goh Sze Fei / Nur Izzuddin | 19; 21 | 16; 21 |
| 3 | (Japan) (Malaysia) | Kanta Tsuneyama; Liew Daren | 21; 16 | 22; 20 |
| 4 | (Japan) (Malaysia) | Akira Koga / Yuta Watanabe; Aaron Chia / Teo Ee Yi | 20; 22 | 17; 21 |
| 5 | (Japan) (Malaysia) | Kenta Nishimoto; Leong Jun Hao | 21; 6 | 19; 21 | 21; 15 |

=== England vs United States ===
England
4
Impact Arena Court 3
11 May 2022, 19:00 UTC+7

United States
1

| | | | 1 | 2 | 3 |
|---|---|---|---|---|---|
| 1 | (England) (United States) | Toby Penty; Enrico Asuncion | 21; 5 | 21; 7 |
| 2 | (England) (United States) | Johnnie Torjussen; Don Henley Averia | 21; 12 | 21; 11 |
| 3 | (England) (United States) | Rory Easton / Zach Russ; Adrian Mar King-Sun / Henry Tang | 21; 12 | 21; 14 |
| 4 | (England) (United States) | Cholan Kayan; William Hu | 21; 18 | 17; 21 | 8; 21 |
| 5 | (England) (United States) | Callum Hemming / Steven Stallwood; Enrico Asuncion / Don Henley Averia | 21; 13 | 21; 9 |
