= 2022 Thomas Cup knockout stage =

Badminton tournament in Bangkok

The knockout stage for the 2022 Thomas Cup in Bangkok, Thailand, began on 12 May 2022 with the quarter-finals and ended on 15 May with the final tie.

== Qualified teams ==
The top two placed teams from each of the eight groups will qualify for this stage.

| Group | Winners | Runners-up |
|---|---|---|
| A | Indonesia | South Korea |
| B | Denmark | China |
| C | Chinese Taipei | India |
| D | Malaysia | Japan |

== Bracket ==
The draw was conducted on 11 May 2022, after the last match of the group stage.

Quarter-finals
Indonesia | 3
China | 0
Chinese Taipei | 2
Japan | 3
India | 3
Malaysia | 2
South Korea | 2
Denmark | 3

Semi-finals
Indonesia | 3
Japan | 2
India | 3
Denmark | 2

Final
Indonesia | 0
India | 3

== Quarter-finals ==
=== Indonesia vs China ===
Indonesia
3
Impact Arena Court 1
12 May 2022 19:00 UTC+7

China
0

| | | | 1 | 2 | 3 |
|---|---|---|---|---|---|---|
| 1 | (Indonesia) (China) | Anthony Sinisuka Ginting; Zhao Junpeng | 21; 12 | 25; 27 | 21; 17 |
| 2 | (Indonesia) (China) | Mohammad Ahsan / Kevin Sanjaya Sukamuljo; Liu Yuchen / Ou Xuanyi | 21; 17 | 21; 16 |
| 3 | (Indonesia) (China) | Jonatan Christie; Li Shifeng | 21; 13 | 21; 18 |
| 4 | (Indonesia) (China) | Fajar Alfian / Muhammad Rian Ardianto; Ren Xiangyu / Tan Qiang | | | | not played |
| 5 | (Indonesia) (China) | Shesar Hiren Rhustavito; Weng Hongyang | | | | not played |

=== Chinese Taipei vs Japan ===
Chinese Taipei
2
Impact Arena Court 2
12 May 2022 14:00 UTC+7

Japan
3

| | | | 1 | 2 | 3 |
|---|---|---|---|---|---|
| 1 | (Chinese Taipei) (Japan) | Chou Tien-chen; Kento Momota | 18; 21 | 13; 21 |
| 2 | (Chinese Taipei) (Japan) | Lee Yang / Wang Chi-lin; Takuro Hoki / Yugo Kobayashi | 21; 14 | 21; 15 |
| 3 | (Chinese Taipei) (Japan) | Wang Tzu-wei; Kanta Tsuneyama | 22; 20 | 21; 17 |
| 4 | (Chinese Taipei) (Japan) | Lu Ching-yao / Yang Po-han; Akira Koga / Yuta Watanabe | 22; 24 | 14; 21 |
| 5 | (Chinese Taipei) (Japan) | Liao Jhuo-fu; Kenta Nishimoto | 13; 21 | 11; 21 |

=== India vs Malaysia ===
India
3
Impact Arena Court 3
12 May 2022 19:00 UTC+7

Malaysia
2

| | | | 1 | 2 | 3 |
|---|---|---|---|---|---|
| 1 | (India) (Malaysia) | Lakshya Sen; Lee Zii Jia | 21; 23 | 9; 21 |
| 2 | (India) (Malaysia) | Satwiksairaj Rankireddy / Chirag Shetty; Goh Sze Fei / Nur Izzuddin | 21; 19 | 21; 15 |
| 3 | (India) (Malaysia) | Srikanth Kidambi; Ng Tze Yong | 21; 11 | 21; 17 |
| 4 | (India) (Malaysia) | Krishna Prasad Garaga / Vishnuvardhan Goud Panjala; Aaron Chia / Teo Ee Yi | 19; 21 | 17; 21 |
| 5 | (India) (Malaysia) | Prannoy H. S. Leong Jun Hao | 21; 13 | 21; 8 |

=== South Korea vs Denmark ===
South Korea
2
Impact Arena Court 2
12 May 2022 19:00 UTC+7

Denmark
3

| | | | 1 | 2 | 3 |
|---|---|---|---|---|---|
| 1 | (South Korea) (Denmark) | Heo Kwang-hee; Viktor Axelsen | 21; 13 | 17; 21 | 19; 21 |
| 2 | (South Korea) (Denmark) | Kang Min-hyuk / Seo Seung-jae; Kim Astrup / Mathias Christiansen | 21; 18 | 21; 18 |
| 3 | (South Korea) (Denmark) | Jeon Hyeok-jin; Anders Antonsen | 21; 19 | 21; 12 |
| 4 | (South Korea) (Denmark) | Choi Sol-gyu / Kim Won-ho; Anders Skaarup Rasmussen / Frederik Søgaard | 21; 18 | 21; 23 | 17; 21 |
| 5 | (South Korea) (Denmark) | Lee Yun-gyu; Rasmus Gemke | 19; 21 | 15; 21 |

== Semi-finals ==
=== Indonesia vs Japan ===
Indonesia
3
Impact Arena Court 2
13 May 2022 18:00 UTC+7

Japan
2

| | | | 1 | 2 | 3 |
|---|---|---|---|---|---|
| 1 | (Indonesia) (Japan) | Anthony Sinisuka Ginting; Kento Momota | 21; 13 | 14; 21 | 21; 12 |
| 2 | (Indonesia) (Japan) | Mohammad Ahsan / Kevin Sanjaya Sukamuljo; Takuro Hoki / Yugo Kobayashi | 22; 20 | 8; 21 | 24; 22 |
| 3 | (Indonesia) (Japan) | Jonatan Christie; Kenta Nishimoto | 20; 22 | 13; 21 |
| 4 | (Indonesia) (Japan) | Fajar Alfian / Muhammad Rian Ardianto; Akira Koga / Yuta Watanabe | 14; 21 | 21; 13 | 18; 21 |
| 5 | (Indonesia) (Japan) | Shesar Hiren Rhustavito; Kodai Naraoka | 21; 17 | 21; 11 |

=== India vs Denmark ===
India
3
Impact Arena Court 1
13 May 2022 18:00 UTC+7

Denmark
2

| | | | 1 | 2 | 3 |
|---|---|---|---|---|---|
| 1 | (India) (Denmark) | Lakshya Sen; Viktor Axelsen | 13; 21 | 13; 21 |
| 2 | (India) (Denmark) | Satwiksairaj Rankireddy / Chirag Shetty; Kim Astrup / Mathias Christiansen | 21; 18 | 21; 23 | 22; 20 |
| 3 | (India) (Denmark) | Srikanth Kidambi; Anders Antonsen | 21; 18 | 12; 21 | 21; 15 |
| 4 | (India) (Denmark) | Krishna Prasad Garaga / Vishnuvardhan Goud Panjala; Anders Skaarup Rasmussen / Frederik Søgaard | 14; 21 | 13; 21 |
| 5 | (India) (Denmark) | Prannoy H. S. Rasmus Gemke | 13; 21 | 21; 9 | 21; 12 |

== Final ==
Indonesia
0
Impact Arena Court 1
15 May 2022 13:00 UTC+7

India
3

| | | | 1 | 2 | 3 |
|---|---|---|---|---|---|---|
| 1 | (Indonesia) (India) | Anthony Sinisuka Ginting; Lakshya Sen | 21; 8 | 17; 21 | 16; 21 |
| 2 | (Indonesia) (India) | Mohammad Ahsan / Kevin Sanjaya Sukamuljo; Satwiksairaj Rankireddy / Chirag Shetty | 21; 18 | 21; 23 | 19; 21 |
| 3 | (Indonesia) (India) | Jonatan Christie; Srikanth Kidambi | 15; 21 | 21; 23 |
| 4 | (Indonesia) (India) | Fajar Alfian / Muhammad Rian Ardianto; Arjun M.R. / Dhruv Kapila | | | | not played |
| 5 | (Indonesia) (India) | Shesar Hiren Rhustavito; Prannoy H. S. | | | | not played |
