= 2022 Badminton Asia Team Championships women's team squads =

This article will list the confirmed women's squads lists for the 2022 Badminton Asia Team Championships. The ranking stated are based on the BWF World Ranking date on 8 February 2022 as per tournament's prospectus. Due to the COVID-19 pandemic, Chinese Taipei and Thailand have withdrawn from the tournament, and Singapore subsequently withdrew from the tournament after 3 players in the team recently recovered from COVID-19.

== Group Y ==
=== Japan ===
8 players are scheduled to represent Japan in the women's team competition of the 2022 Badminton Asia Team Championships.

Name	DoB/Age	Ranking of event	
Name	DoB/Age	WS	WD
Riko Gunji	31 July 2002 (aged 19)	181	656
Natsuki Nidaira	12 July 1998 (aged 23)	72	-
Hirari Mizui	22 July 2000 (aged 21)	104	-
Natsuki Oie	13 July 1998 (aged 23)	112	-
Yuna Kato	26 June 2002 (aged 19)	-	656
Rui Hirokami	26 July 2002 (aged 19)	-	656
Hina Akechi	14 March 2005 (aged 16)	-	-
Maya Taguchi	9 October 2005 (aged 16)	-	-

=== India ===
10 players are scheduled to represent India in the women's team competition of the 2022 Badminton Asia Team Championships.

Name	DoB/Age	Ranking of event	
Name	DoB/Age	WS	WD
Aakarshi Kashyap	24 August 2001 (aged 20)	56	-
Malvika Bansod	15 September 2001 (aged 20)	61	-
Ashmita Chaliha	18 October 1999 (aged 22)	62	-
Tara Shah	16 March 2005 (aged 16)	-	-
Simran Shingi	11 April 2002 (aged 19)	736	78
Khushi Gupta	3 June 2001 (aged 20)	-	167
Nila Valluvan	26 May 2001 (aged 20)	-	232
Arul Bala Radhakrishnan	30 March 2002 (aged 19)	-	232
Arathi Sara Sunil	1 October 1994 (aged 27)	-	188
Riza Mehreen	23 January 2003 (aged 19)	-	188

=== Malaysia ===
12 players are scheduled to represent Malaysia in the women's team competition of the 2022 Badminton Asia Team Championships.

Name	DoB/Age	Ranking of event	
Name	DoB/Age	WS	WD
Kisona Selvaduray	1 October 1998 (aged 23)	64	-
Eoon Qi Xuan	2 November 2000 (aged 21)	126	856
Siti Nurshuhaini	1 September 2004 (aged 17)	309	856
Myisha Mohd Khairul	27 July 2002 (aged 19)	369	-
Tan Zhing Yi	1 August 2003 (aged 18)	1484	856
Pearly Tan	14 March 2000 (aged 21)	-	15
Thinaah Muralitharan	3 January 1998 (aged 24)	766	15
Teoh Mei Xing	6 March 1997 (aged 24)	-	81
Anna Cheong	15 March 1998 (aged 23)	-	74
Valeree Siow	18 March 2002 (aged 19)	-	91
Low Yeen Yuan	9 March 2002 (aged 19)	-	91
Go Pei Kee	18 April 2002 (aged 19)	-	269

== Group Z ==
=== South Korea ===
8 players are scheduled to represent South Korea in the women's team competition of the 2022 Badminton Asia Team Championships.

Name	DoB/Age	Ranking of event	
Name	DoB/Age	WS	WD
Baek Ha-na	22 September 2000 (aged 21)	-	14
Kim Joo-eun	10 January 1997 (aged 25)	-	-
Kim Min-ji	31 May 1999 (aged 22)	-	421
Lee Se-yeon	14 April 1995 (aged 26)	213	-
Lee Seo-jin	23 December 2004 (aged 17)	-	-
Park Min-jeong	14 August 1997 (aged 24)	-	-
Seong Seung-yeon	24 February 1997 (aged 24)	-	-
Sim Yu-jin	13 May 1999 (aged 22)	49	-

=== Indonesia ===
10 players are scheduled to represent Indonesia in the women's team competition of the 2022 Badminton Asia Team Championships.

Name	DoB/Age	Ranking of event	
Name	DoB/Age	WS	WD
Gregoria Mariska Tunjung	11 August 1999 (aged 22)	27	-
Putri Kusuma Wardani	20 July 2002 (aged 19)	76	-
Stephanie Widjaja	19 February 2003 (aged 18)	296	-
Bilqis Prasista	24 May 2003 (aged 18)	478	-
Saifi Rizka Nurhidayah	24 August 2002 (aged 19)	766	-
Nita Violina Marwah	25 March 2001 (aged 20)	-	38
Febriana Dwipuji Kusuma	19 February 2001 (aged 20)	-	121
Amalia Cahaya Pratiwi	14 October 2001 (aged 20)	-	121
Jesita Putri Miantoro	1 May 2002 (aged 19)	-	379
Lanny Tria Mayasari	8 May 2002 (aged 19)	-	490

=== Hong Kong ===
10 players are scheduled to represent Hong Kong in the women's team competition of the 2022 Badminton Asia Team Championships.

Name	DoB/Age	Ranking of event	
Name	DoB/Age	WS	WD
Cheung Ying Mei	4 April 1994 (aged 27)	204	-
Lo Sin Yan	25 February 2003 (aged 18)	-	-
Saloni Samirbhai Mehta	27 August 2002 (aged 19)	-	-
Leung Sze Lok	11 May 2001 (aged 20)	-	-
Yeung Pui Lam	26 October 2001 (aged 20)	-	220
Yau Mau Ying	24 October 1999 (aged 22)	-	304
Yeung Nga Ting	13 October 1998 (aged 23)	-	52
Yeung Sum Yee	18 August 1999 (aged 22)	225	-
Yuen Sin Ying	13 January 1994 (aged 28)	-	49
Fan Ka Yan	27 January 1997 (aged 25)	-	214

=== Kazakhstan ===
5 players are scheduled to represent Kazakhstan in the women's team competition of the 2022 Badminton Asia Team Championships.

Name	DoB/Age	Ranking of event	
Name	DoB/Age	WS	WD
Nargiza Rakhmetullayeva	16 July 2004 (aged 17)	964	856
Arina Sazonova	23 December 1998 (aged 23)	731	568
Kamila Smagulova	14 June 1997 (aged 24)	429	365
Aisha Zhumabek	7 June 2000 (aged 21)	370	365
Dilyara Dzhumadilova	20 August 2004 (aged 17)	964	856
