= 2022 Badminton Asia Championships =

Badminton tournament, Manila, Philippines

Tournament details
- Dates: 26 April – 1 May
- Total prize money: US$400,000
- Venue: Muntinlupa Sports Complex
- Location: Muntinlupa, Metro Manila, Philippines

The 2022 Badminton Asia Championships (officially known as the Smart Badminton Asia Championship 2022 for sponsorship reasons) was a badminton tournament held at the Muntinlupa Sports Complex, Muntinlupa in the Philippines from 26 April to 1 May 2022. The prior tournament was held in 2019, with no tournament held for the ensuing two years due to the COVID-19 pandemic.

== Tournament ==
The 2022 Badminton Asia Championships was the 39th edition of the Badminton Asia Championships. This tournament is hosted by the Philippines Badminton Association, with the sanction of Badminton Asia.

=== Venue ===
This international tournament was held at the Muntinlupa Sport Complex in Muntinlupa, Philippines.

=== Point distribution ===
This tournament is graded based on the BWF points system equivalent to the BWF World Tour Super 1000 event.

| Winner | Runner-up | 3/4 | 5/8 | 9/16 | 17/32 |
|---|---|---|---|---|---|
| 12,000 | 10,200 | 8,400 | 6,600 | 4,800 | 3,000 |

=== Prize money ===
The total prize money for this year tournament is US$400,000. Distribution of prize money is in accordance with BWF regulations.

| Event | Winner | Finals | Semifinals | Quarterfinals | Last 16 |
| Singles | $30,000 | $15,200 | $5,800 | $2,400 | $1,400 |
| Doubles | $31,600 | $15,200 | $5,600 | $2,900 | $1,500 |

== Medal summary ==
=== Medalists ===
| Event | Gold | Silver | Bronze |
|---|---|---|---|
| Men's singles | (Malaysia) Lee Zii Jia | (Indonesia) Jonatan Christie | (Indonesia) Chico Aura Dwi Wardoyo |
| Men's singles | (Malaysia) Lee Zii Jia | (Indonesia) Jonatan Christie | (China) Weng Hongyang |
| Women's singles | (China) Wang Zhiyi | (Japan) Akane Yamaguchi | (India) P. V. Sindhu |
| Women's singles | (China) Wang Zhiyi | (Japan) Akane Yamaguchi | (South Korea) An Se-young |
| Men's doubles | (Indonesia) Pramudya Kusumawardana (Indonesia) Yeremia Rambitan | (Malaysia) Aaron Chia (Malaysia) Soh Wooi Yik | (Malaysia) Goh Sze Fei (Malaysia) Nur Izzuddin |
| Men's doubles | (Indonesia) Pramudya Kusumawardana (Indonesia) Yeremia Rambitan | (Malaysia) Aaron Chia (Malaysia) Soh Wooi Yik | (Indonesia) Fajar Alfian (Indonesia) Muhammad Rian Ardianto |
| Women's doubles | (China) Chen Qingchen (China) Jia Yifan | (Japan) Rin Iwanaga (Japan) Kie Nakanishi | (China) Du Yue (China) Li Wenmei |
| Women's doubles | (China) Chen Qingchen (China) Jia Yifan | (Japan) Rin Iwanaga (Japan) Kie Nakanishi | (Japan) Yuki Fukushima (Japan) Sayaka Hirota |
| Mixed doubles | (China) Zheng Siwei (China) Huang Yaqiong | (China) Wang Yilyu (China) Huang Dongping | (Indonesia) Praveen Jordan (Indonesia) Melati Daeva Oktavianti |
| Mixed doubles | (China) Zheng Siwei (China) Huang Yaqiong | (China) Wang Yilyu (China) Huang Dongping | (Japan) Yuta Watanabe (Japan) Arisa Higashino |

=== Medal table ===
* Host nation (Philippines)

| Rank | Nation | Gold | Silver | Bronze | Total |
|---|---|---|---|---|---|
| 1 | China | 3 | 1 | 2 | 6 |
| 2 | Indonesia | 1 | 1 | 3 | 5 |
| 3 | Malaysia | 1 | 1 | 1 | 3 |
| 4 | Japan | 0 | 2 | 2 | 4 |
| 5 | India | 0 | 0 | 1 | 1 |
| 5 | South Korea | 0 | 0 | 1 | 1 |
| Totals (6 entries) | | 5 | 5 | 10 | 20 |

== Group stage ==
=== Final standings ===
| Group | Men's singles | Women's singles | Women's doubles |
|---|---|---|---|
| A | (Jordan) Bahaedeen Ahmad Alshannik | (Malaysia) Tan Zhing Yi | — |
| B | (China) Weng Hongyang | (Indonesia) Stephanie Widjaja | — |
| C | (Kazakhstan) Dmitriy Panarin | (South Korea) Lee Seo-jin | (Hong Kong) Fan Ka Yan (Hong Kong) Yau Mau Ying |
| D | (China) Lei Lanxi | (Indonesia) Komang Ayu Cahya Dewi | (Philippines) Eleanor Inlayo (Philippines) Susmita Ramos |

=== Men's singles ===
==== Group A ====
| Rank | Player | Pts | Pld | W | L | SF | SA | PF | PA |
|---|---|---|---|---|---|---|---|---|---|
| | (Thailand) Adulrach Namkul | Promoted to Main Draw | | | | | | | |
| 1 | (Jordan) Bahaedeen Ahmad Alshannik | 0 | 0 | 0 | 0 | 0 | 0 | 0 | 0 |

==== Group B ====
| Rank | Player | Pts | Pld | W | L | SF | SA | PF | PA |
|---|---|---|---|---|---|---|---|---|---|
| 1 | (China) Weng Hongyang | 2 | 2 | 2 | 0 | 4 | 0 | 84 | 37 |
| 2 | (Myanmar) Phone Pyae Naing | 1 | 2 | 1 | 1 | 2 | 2 | 59 | 63 |
| 3 | (Maldives) Hussein Zayan Shaheed | 0 | 2 | 0 | 2 | 0 | 4 | 41 | 84 |

| Date | | Score | | Set 1 | Set 2 | Set 3 |
|---|---|---|---|---|---|---|
| April 26; 09:00 | Weng Hongyang (China) | 2–0 | (Maldives) Hussein Zayan Shaheed | 21–11 | 21–9 | |
| April 26; 10:29 | Phane Pyoe Naing (Myanmar) | 2–0 | (Maldives) Hussein Zayan Shaheed | 21–13 | 21–8 | |
| April 26; 11:43 | Weng Hongyang (China) | 2–0 | (Myanmar) Phone Pyae Naing | 21–10 | 21–7 | |

==== Group C ====
| Rank | Player | Pts | Pld | W | L | SF | SA | PF | PA |
|---|---|---|---|---|---|---|---|---|---|
| 1 | (Kazakhstan) Dmitriy Panarin | 2 | 2 | 2 | 0 | 4 | 0 | 84 | 48 |
| 2 | (Philippines) Ros Leonard Pedrosa | 1 | 2 | 1 | 1 | 2 | 2 | 64 | 69 |
| 3 | (Bahrain) Adnan Ebrahim | 0 | 2 | 0 | 2 | 0 | 4 | 53 | 84 |

| Date | | Score | | Set 1 | Set 2 | Set 3 |
|---|---|---|---|---|---|---|
| April 26; 09:00 | Dmitriy Panarin (Kazakhstan) | 2–0 | (Bahrain) Adnan Ebrahim | 21–12 | 21–14 | |
| April 26; 11:00 | Ros Leonard Pedrosa (Philippines) | 2–0 | (Bahrain) Adnan Ebrahim | 21–19 | 21–8 | |
| April 26; 12:00 | Dmitriy Panarin (Kazakhstan) | 2–0 | (Philippines) Ros Leonard Pedrosa | 21–14 | 21–8 | |

==== Group D ====
| Rank | Player | Pts | Pld | W | L | SF | SA | PF | PA |
|---|---|---|---|---|---|---|---|---|---|
| 1 | (China) Lei Lanxi | 2 | 2 | 2 | 0 | 4 | 1 | 97 | 80 |
| 2 | (Hong Kong) Chan Yin Chak | 1 | 2 | 1 | 1 | 3 | 2 | 90 | 73 |
| 3 | (Philippines) Jewel Angelo Albo | 0 | 2 | 0 | 2 | 0 | 4 | 50 | 84 |

| Date | | Score | | Set 1 | Set 2 | Set 3 |
|---|---|---|---|---|---|---|
| April 26; 09:25 | Lei Lanxi (China) | 2–0 | (Philippines) Jewel Angelo Albo | 21–17 | 21–15 | |
| April 26; 11:00 | Chan Yin Chak (Hong Kong) | 2–0 | (Philippines) Jewel Angelo Albo | 21–8 | 21–10 | |
| April 26; 11:35 | Lei Lanxi (China) | 2–1 | (Hong Kong) Chan Yin Chak | 21–16 | 13–21 | 21–11 |

=== Women's singles ===
==== Group A ====
| Rank | Player | Pts | Pld | W | L | SF | SA | PF | PA |
|---|---|---|---|---|---|---|---|---|---|
| | (Hong Kong) Yeung Sum Yee | Promoted to Main Draw | | | | | | | |
| 1 | (Malaysia) Tan Zhing Yi | 1 | 1 | 1 | 0 | 2 | 0 | 42 | 23 |
| 2 | (Jordan) Domou Amro | 0 | 1 | 0 | 1 | 0 | 2 | 23 | 42 |

| Date | | Score | | Set 1 | Set 2 | Set 3 |
|---|---|---|---|---|---|---|
| April 26; 10:36 | Domou Amro (Jordan) | 0–2 | (Malaysia) Tan Zhing Yi | 8–21 | 15–21 | |

==== Group B ====
| Rank | Player | Pts | Pld | W | L | SF | SA | PF | PA |
|---|---|---|---|---|---|---|---|---|---|
| 1 | (Indonesia) Stephanie Widjaja | 2 | 2 | 2 | 0 | 4 | 0 | 84 | 30 |
| 2 | (Philippines) Janelle Anne Andres | 1 | 2 | 1 | 1 | 2 | 2 | 60 | 66 |
| 3 | (Maldives) Fathimath Nabaaha Abdul Razzaq | 0 | 2 | 0 | 2 | 0 | 4 | 36 | 84 |

| Date | | Score | | Set 1 | Set 2 | Set 3 |
|---|---|---|---|---|---|---|
| April 26; 09:00 | Fathimath Nabaaha Abdul Razzaq (Maldives) | 0–2 | (Indonesia) Stephanie Widjaja | 4–21 | 8–21 | |
| April 26; 10:04 | Janelle Anne Andres (Philippines) | 0–2 | (Indonesia) Stephanie Widjaja | 10–21 | 8–21 | |
| April 26; 10:36 | Fathimath Nabaaha Abdul Razzaq (Maldives) | 0–2 | (Philippines) Janelle Anne Andres | 17–21 | 7–21 | |

==== Group C ====
| Rank | Player | Pts | Pld | W | L | SF | SA | PF | PA |
|---|---|---|---|---|---|---|---|---|---|
| 1 | (South Korea) Lee Seo-jin | 2 | 2 | 2 | 0 | 4 | 0 | 84 | 64 |
| 2 | (Malaysia) Siti Nurshuhaini | 1 | 2 | 1 | 1 | 2 | 3 | 88 | 98 |
| 3 | (Hong Kong) Saloni Samirbhai Mehta | 0 | 2 | 0 | 2 | 1 | 4 | 90 | 100 |

| Date | | Score | | Set 1 | Set 2 | Set 3 |
|---|---|---|---|---|---|---|
| April 26; 09:35 | Siti Nurshuhaini (Malaysia) | 2–1 | (Hong Kong) Saloni Samirbhai Mehta | 21–17 | 16–21 | 21–18 |
| April 26; 11:35 | Lee Seo-jin (South Korea) | 2–0 | (Hong Kong) Saloni Samirbhai Mehta | 21–17 | 21–17 | |
| April 26; 12:46 | Siti Nurshuhaini (Malaysia) | 0–2 | (South Korea) Lee Seo-jin | 13–21 | 17–21 | |

==== Group D ====
| Rank | Player | Pts | Pld | W | L | SF | SA | PF | PA |
|---|---|---|---|---|---|---|---|---|---|
| 1 | (Indonesia) Komang Ayu Cahya Dewi | 2 | 2 | 2 | 0 | 4 | 0 | 88 | 58 |
| 2 | (Malaysia) Myisha Mohd Khairul | 1 | 2 | 1 | 1 | 2 | 3 | 82 | 92 |
| 3 | (Philippines) Mikaela de Guzman | 0 | 2 | 0 | 2 | 1 | 4 | 81 | 101 |

| Date | | Score | | Set 1 | Set 2 | Set 3 |
|---|---|---|---|---|---|---|
| April 26; 09:35 | Myisha Mohd Khairul (Malaysia) | 2–1 | (Philippines) Mikalea de Guzman | 13–21 | 21–15 | 21–14 |
| April 26; 11:19 | Komang Ayu Cahya Dewi (Indonesia) | 2–0 | (Philippines) Mikaela de Guzman | 25–23 | 21–8 | |
| April 26; 13:00 | Myisha Mohd Khairul (Malaysia) | 0–2 | (Indonesia) Komang Ayu Cahya Dewi | 18–21 | 9–21 | |

=== Women's doubles ===
==== Group B ====
| Rank | Player | Pts | Pld | W | L | SF | SA | PF | PA |
|---|---|---|---|---|---|---|---|---|---|
| | (Chinese Taipei) Lee Chia-hsin (Chinese Taipei) Teng Chun-hsun | Withdrawn | | | | | | | |
| 1 | (Vietnam) Đinh Thị Phương Hồng (Vietnam) Phạm Thị Khánh | Promoted to Main Draw | | | | | | | |

==== Group C ====
| Rank | Player | Pts | Pld | W | L | SF | SA | PF | PA |
|---|---|---|---|---|---|---|---|---|---|
| | (Philippines) Nicole Albo (Philippines) Thea Pomar | Promoted to Main Draw | | | | | | | |
| 1 | (Hong Kong) Fan Ka Yan (Hong Kong) Yau Mau Ying | 0 | 0 | 0 | 0 | 0 | 0 | 0 | 0 |

==== Group D ====
| Rank | Player | Pts | Pld | W | L | SF | SA | PF | PA |
|---|---|---|---|---|---|---|---|---|---|
| | (Hong Kong) Leung Sze Lok (Hong Kong) Yuen Sin Ying | Promoted to Main Draw | | | | | | | |
| 1 | (Philippines) Eleanor Inlayo (Philippines) Susmita Ramos | 0 | 0 | 0 | 0 | 0 | 0 | 0 | 0 |

== Men's singles ==
=== Seeds ===
1. (Japan) Kento Momota (first round)
2. (Indonesia) Anthony Sinisuka Ginting (quarter-finals)
3. (Malaysia) Lee Zii Jia (champion)
4. (Indonesia) Jonatan Christie (final)
5. (India) Lakshya Sen (first round)
6. (Singapore) Loh Kean Yew (quarter-finals)
7. (India) Srikanth Kidambi (second round)
8. (Japan) Kanta Tsuneyama (quarter-finals)

=== Finals ===
Semifinals
(Indonesia) Chico Aura Dwi Wardoyo | 9 | 21 | 16
4 | (Indonesia) Jonatan Christie | 21 | 18 | 21
3 | (Malaysia) Lee Zii Jia | 21 | 21
B1 | (China) Weng Hongyang | 11 | 19

Final
4 | (Indonesia) Jonatan Christie | 17 | 21
3 | (Malaysia) Lee Zii Jia | 21 | 23

=== Top half ===
==== Section 1 ====
First Round
1 | (Japan) K Momota | 21 | 17 | 7
(Indonesia) C A Dwi Wardoyo | 17 | 21 | 21
(Hong Kong) Lee C Y | 18 | 21 | 21
A1 | (Jordan) B A Alshannik | 21 | 11 | 15
5 | (India) L Sen | 21 | 10 | 19
(China) Li SF | 12 | 21 | 21
(Chinese Taipei) Wang T-w | 21 | 9 | 21
(Malaysia) A Sholeh | 14 | 21 | 18

Second Round
(Indonesia) C A Dwi Wardoyo | 21 | 22
(Hong Kong) Lee C Y | 19 | 20
(China) Li SF | 22 | 23
(Chinese Taipei) Wang T-w | 20 | 21

Quarterfinals
(Indonesia) C A Dwi Wardoyo | 21 | 21
(China) Li SF | 17 | 14

==== Section 2 ====
First Round
4 | (Indonesia) J Christie | 21 | 21
(India) B. Sai Praneeth | 17 | 13
(South Korea) Heo K-h | 21 | 10 | 15
(Malaysia) Liew D | 8 | 21 | 21
6 | (Singapore) Loh K Y | 21 | 15 | 21
(Thailand) K Wangcharoen | 16 | 21 | 17
C1 | (Kazakhstan) D Panarin | 18 | 14
(Japan) K Watanabe | 21 | 21

Second Round
4 | (Indonesia) J Christie | 21 | 13 | 21
(Malaysia) Liew D | 14 | 21 | 19
6 | (Singapore) Loh K Y | 21 | 21
(Japan) K Watanabe | 16 | 6

Quarterfinals
4 | (Indonesia) J Christie | 22 | 23
6 | (Singapore) Loh K Y | 20 | 21

=== Bottom half ===
==== Section 3 ====
First Round
(Vietnam) Nguyễn T M | 21 | 21
(Thailand) K Phetpradab | 19 | 17
D1 | (China) Lei LX | 21 | 14 | 17
8 | (Japan) K Tsuneyama | 11 | 21 | 21
(Chinese Taipei) Lin C-y | 21 | 20 | 19
(Indonesia) S H Rhustavito | 14 | 22 | 21
(China) Sun FX | 21 | 14 | 14
3 | (Malaysia) Lee Z J | 19 | 21 | 21

Second Round
(Vietnam) Nguyễn T M | 9 | 10
8 | (Japan) K Tsuneyama | 21 | 21
(Indonesia) S H Rhustavito | 14 | 20
3 | (Malaysia) Lee Z J | 21 | 22

Quarterfinals
8 | (Japan) K Tsuneyama | 13 | 11
3 | (Malaysia) Lee Z J | 21 | 21

==== Section 4 ====
First Round
B1 | (China) Weng HY | 22 | 21
(Singapore) J Teh | 20 | 17
(Malaysia) Ng T Y | 20 | 15
7 | (India) S Kidambi | 22 | 21
PFQ | (Thailand) A Namkul | 21 | 17 | 14
(Japan) K Nishimoto | 16 | 21 | 21
(Thailand) S Thammasin | 13 | 21 | 13
2 | (Indonesia) A S Ginting | 21 | 17 | 21

Second Round
B1 | (China) Weng HY | 21 | 17 | 21
7 | (India) S Kidambi | 16 | 21 | 17
(Japan) K Nishimoto | 14 | 21 | 13
2 | (Indonesia) A S Ginting | 21 | 13 | 21

Quarterfinals
B1 | (China) Weng HY | 21 | 16 | 21
2 | (Indonesia) A S Ginting | 13 | 21 | 11

== Women's singles ==
=== Seeds ===
1. (Japan) Akane Yamaguchi (final)
2. (South Korea) An Se-young (semi-finals)
3. (Japan) Nozomi Okuhara (first round)
4. (India) P. V. Sindhu (semi-finals)
5. (China) He Bingjiao (quarter-finals)
6. (Thailand) Pornpawee Chochuwong (quarter-finals)
7. (Thailand) Busanan Ongbamrungphan (first round)
8. (Japan) Sayaka Takahashi (quarter-finals)

=== Finals ===
Semifinals
1 | (Japan) Akane Yamaguchi | 13 | 21 | 21
4 | (India) P. V. Sindhu | 21 | 19 | 16
(China) Wang Zhiyi | 10 | 21 | 21
2 | (South Korea) An Se-young | 21 | 12 | 16

Final
1 | (Japan) Akane Yamaguchi | 21 | 13 | 19
(China) Wang Zhiyi | 15 | 21 | 21

=== Top half ===
==== Section 1 ====
First Round
1 | (Japan) A Yamaguchi | 21 | 21
(India) A Kashyap | 15 | 9
D1 | (Indonesia) K A C Dewi | 21 | 21
(China) Han Y | 14 | 12
6 | (Thailand) P Chochuwong | 21 | 21
(Chinese Taipei) Sung S-y | 12 | 15
(South Korea) Kim G-e | 21 | 12 | 15
(Indonesia) P K Wardani | 10 | 21 | 21

Second Round
1 | (Japan) A Yamaguchi | 21 | 21 | 21
D1 | (Indonesia) K A C Dewi | 23 | 9 | 19
6 | (Thailand) P Chochuwong | 21 | 21
(Indonesia) P K Wardani | 12 | 11

Quarterfinals
1 | (Japan) A Yamaguchi | 9 | 21 | 21
6 | (Thailand) P Chochuwong | 21 | 15 | 17

==== Section 2 ====
First Round
4 | (India) P. V. Sindhu | 18 | 27 | 21
(Chinese Taipei) Pai Y-p | 21 | 25 | 9
(Singapore) J Hooi | 21 | 21
C1 | (South Korea) Lee S-j | 18 | 10
5 | (China) He BJ | 18 | 21 | 21
(Japan) A Ohori | 21 | 13 | 13
(Malaysia) Kisona S | 21 | 22
PFQ | (Hong Kong) Yeung S Y | 10 | 20

Second Round
4 | (India) P. V. Sindhu | 21 | 21
(Singapore) J Hooi | 16 | 16
5 | (China) He BJ | 21 | 21
(Malaysia) Kisona S | 18 | 14

Quarterfinals
4 | (India) P. V. Sindhu | 21 | 13 | 21
5 | (China) He BJ | 9 | 21 | 19

=== Bottom half ===
==== Section 3 ====
First Round
(South Korea) Sim Y-j | 15 | 21 | 13
(India) S Nehwal | 21 | 17 | 21
(China) Wang ZY | 12 | 21 | 21
7 | (Thailand) B Ongbamrungphan | 21 | 15 | 15
A1 | (Malaysia) Tan Z Y | 7 | 10
(Chinese Taipei) Hsu W-c | 21 | 21
(Myanmar) Thet Htar T | 21
3 | (Japan) N Okuhara | 18^{r}

Second Round
(India) S Nehwal | 21 | 7 | 13
(China) Wang ZY | 12 | 21 | 21
(Chinese Taipei) Hsu W-c | 21 | 13 | 21
(Myanmar) Thet Htar T | 12 | 21 | 19

Quarterfinals
(China) Wang ZY | 21 | 21
(Chinese Taipei) Hsu W-c | 19 | 9

==== Section 4 ====
First Round
(Singapore) Yeo J M | 9 | 21 | 26
(India) M Bansod | 21 | 17 | 24
(Vietnam) Nguyễn T L | 21 | 17 | 16
8 | (Japan) S Takahashi | 16 | 21 | 21
(Indonesia) G M Tunjung | 22 | 22 | 15
(China) Zhang YM | 20 | 24 | 21
B1 | (Indonesia) S Widjaja | 16 | 21 | 16
2 | (South Korea) An S-y | 21 | 16 | 21

Second Round
(Singapore) Yeo J M | 12 | 21 | 16
8 | (Japan) S Takahashi | 21 | 14 | 21
(China) Zhang YM | 7 | 19
2 | (South Korea) An S-y | 21 | 21

Quarterfinals
8 | (Japan) S Takahashi | 15 | 11
2 | (South Korea) An S-y | 21 | 21

== Men's doubles ==
=== Seeds ===
1. (Indonesia) Mohammad Ahsan / Hendra Setiawan (second round)
2. (Japan) Takuro Hoki / Yugo Kobayashi (quarter-finals)
3. (India) Satwiksairaj Rankireddy / Chirag Shetty (quarter-finals)
4. (Indonesia) Fajar Alfian / Muhammad Rian Ardianto (semi-finals)
5. (Malaysia) Aaron Chia / Soh Wooi Yik (final)
6. (Malaysia) Ong Yew Sin / Teo Ee Yi (second round)
7. (South Korea) Choi Sol-gyu / Seo Seung-jae (withdrew)
8. (Malaysia) Goh Sze Fei / Nur Izzuddin (semi-finals)

=== Finals ===
Semifinals
8 | (Malaysia) Goh Sze Fei (Malaysia) Nur Izzuddin | 13 | 15
5 | (Malaysia) Aaron Chia (Malaysia) Soh Wooi Yik | 21 | 21
4 | (Indonesia) Fajar Alfian (Indonesia) Muhammad Rian Ardianto | 20 | 21 | 18
(Indonesia) Pramudya Kusumawardana (Indonesia) Yeremia Rambitan | 22 | 13 | 21

Final
5 | (Malaysia) Aaron Chia (Malaysia) Soh Wooi Yik | 21 | 10
(Indonesia) Pramudya Kusumawardana (Indonesia) Yeremia Rambitan | 23 | 21

=== Top half ===
==== Section 1 ====
First Round
1 | (Indonesia) M Ahsan (Indonesia) H Setiawan | w | / | o
(Japan) H Okamura (Japan) M Onodera
(Thailand) C Charoenkitamorn (Thailand) N Yordphaisong | 13 | 19
(China) Ren XY (China) Tan Q | 21 | 21
8 | (Malaysia) Goh S F (Malaysia) N Izzuddin | 21 | 21
(Philippines) S Padiz (Philippines) J Villabrille | 9 | 14
(India) K P Garaga (India) V G Panjala | 10 | 21 | 16
(South Korea) Kang M-h (South Korea) Kim W-h | 21 | 19 | 21

Second Round
1 | (Indonesia) M Ahsan (Indonesia) H Setiawan | 9 | 15
(China) Ren XY (China) Tan Q | 21 | 21
8 | (Malaysia) Goh S F (Malaysia) N Izzuddin | 21 | 21
(South Korea) Kang M-h (South Korea) Kim W-h | 17 | 17

Quarterfinals
(China) Ren XY (China) Tan Q | 19 | 14
8 | (Malaysia) Goh S F (Malaysia) N Izzuddin | 21 | 21

==== Section 2 ====
First Round
3 | (India) S Rankireddy (India) C Shetty | 21 | 21
(Thailand) A Gaterahong (Thailand) N Tulamok | 13 | 9
(Indonesia) M S Fikri (Indonesia) B Maulana | 21 | 17 | 17
(Japan) A Koga (Japan) T Saito | 18 | 21 | 21
5 | (Malaysia) A Chia (Malaysia) Soh W Y | 18 | 21 | 21
(China) He JT (China) Zhou HD | 21 | 12 | 18
(Singapore) D B Chrisnanta (Singapore) A Kwek | 21 | 22
(Hong Kong) Chow H L (Hong Kong) Lui C W | 10 | 20

Second Round
3 | (India) S Rankireddy (India) C Shetty | 21 | 21
(Japan) A Koga (Japan) T Saito | 17 | 15
5 | (Malaysia) A Chia (Malaysia) Soh W Y | 21 | 21
(Singapore) D B Chrisnanta (Singapore) A Kwek | 16 | 19

Quarterfinals
3 | (India) S Rankireddy (India) C Shetty | 21 | 14 | 16
5 | (Malaysia) A Chia (Malaysia) Soh W Y | 12 | 21 | 21

=== Bottom half ===
==== Section 3 ====
First Round
(Malaysia) Man W C (Malaysia) Tee K W | 21 | 17 | 21
(Thailand) W Phakjarung (Thailand) W Thongkham | 16 | 21 | 12
(Philippines) C Bernardo (Philippines) P J Pantig | w | / | o
7 | (South Korea) Choi S-g (South Korea) Seo S-j
(China) Liu YC (China) Ou XY | 21 | 18 | 21
(Hong Kong) Law C H (Hong Kong) Lee C H | 9 | 21 | 16
(India) Arjun M. R. (India) D Kapila | 16 | 22
4 | (Indonesia) F Alfian (Indonesia) M R Ardianto | 21 | 24

Second Round
(Malaysia) Man W C (Malaysia) Tee K W | 21 | 21
(Philippines) C Bernardo (Philippines) P J Pantig | 7 | 12
(China) Liu YC (China) Ou XY | 19 | 21 | 19
4 | (Indonesia) F Alfian (Indonesia) M R Ardianto | 21 | 18 | 21

Quarterfinals
(Malaysia) Man W C (Malaysia) Tee K W | 16 | 16
4 | (Indonesia) F Alfian (Indonesia) M R Ardianto | 21 | 21

==== Section 4 ====
First Round
(Indonesia) P Kusumawardana (Indonesia) Y Rambitan | w | / | o
(India) M Attri (India) B. S Reddy
(Hong Kong) Chang T C (Hong Kong) Yeung M N | 18 | 17
6 | (Malaysia) Ong Y S (Malaysia) Teo E Y | 21 | 21
(Singapore) T Hee (Singapore) Loh K H | w | / | o
(Sri Lanka) S Dias (Sri Lanka) B Goonethilleka
(Chinese Taipei) Lu C-y (Chinese Taipei) Yang P-h | 21 | 17 | 16
2 | (Japan) T Hoki (Japan) Y Kobayashi | 13 | 21 | 21

Second Round
(Indonesia) P Kusumawardana (Indonesia) Y Rambitan | 21 | 18 | 21
6 | (Malaysia) Ong Y S (Malaysia) Teo E Y | 16 | 21 | 16
(Singapore) T Hee (Singapore) Loh K H | 10 | 12
2 | (Japan) T Hoki (Japan) Y Kobayashi | 21 | 21

Quarterfinals
(Indonesia) P Kusumawardana (Indonesia) Y Rambitan | 21 | 19 | 21
2 | (Japan) T Hoki (Japan) Y Kobayashi | 15 | 21 | 19

== Women's doubles ==
=== Seeds ===
1. (China) Chen Qingchen / Jia Yifan (champions)
2. (South Korea) Lee So-hee / Shin Seung-chan (quarter-finals)
3. (South Korea) Kim So-yeong / Kong Hee-yong (first round)
4. (Japan) Yuki Fukushima / Sayaka Hirota (semi-finals)
5. (Japan) Nami Matsuyama / Chiharu Shida (quarter-finals)
6. (Thailand) Jongkolphan Kititharakul / Rawinda Prajongjai (second round)
7. (Malaysia) Pearly Tan / Thinaah Muralitharan (quarter-finals)
8. (India) Ashwini Ponnappa / N. Sikki Reddy (withdrew)

=== Finals ===
Semifinals
1 | (China) Chen Qingchen (China) Jia Yifan | 21 | 21
(China) Du Yue (China) Li Wenmei | 12 | 17
4 | (Japan) Yuki Fukushima (Japan) Sayaka Hirota | 21 | 15 | 19
(Japan) Rin Iwanaga (Japan) Kie Nakanishi | 16 | 21 | 21

Final
1 | (China) Chen Qingchen (China) Jia Yifan | 21 | 21
(Japan) Rin Iwanaga (Japan) Kie Nakanishi | 11 | 15

=== Top half ===
==== Section 1 ====
First Round
1 | (China) Chen QC (China) Jia YF | 21 | 21
(South Korea) Jeong N-e (South Korea) Kim H-j | 12 | 19
(Malaysia) A Cheong (Malaysia) Teoh M X | 21 | 21
(India) K A Bhat (India) S Gautam | 19 | 12
5 | (Japan) N Matsuyama (Japan) C Shida | 21 | 21
D1 | (Philippines) E Inlayo (Philippines) S Ramos | 6 | 11
PFQ | (Philippines) N Albo (Philippines) T Pomar | 8 | 15
(Hong Kong) Ng T Y (Hong Kong) Tsang H Y | 21 | 21

Second Round
1 | (China) Chen QC (China) Jia YF | 21 | 21
(Malaysia) A Cheong (Malaysia) Teoh M X | 18 | 16
5 | (Japan) N Matsuyama (Japan) C Shida | 21 | 21
(Hong Kong) Ng T Y (Hong Kong) Tsang H Y | 7 | 13

Quarterfinals
1 | (China) Chen QC (China) Jia YF | 21 | 21
5 | (Japan) N Matsuyama (Japan) C Shida | 15 | 19

==== Section 2 ====
First round
3 | (South Korea) Kim S-y (South Korea) Kong H-y | 17 | 22 | 11
(Indonesia) S F S Ramadhanti (Indonesia) R Sugiarto | 21 | 20 | 21
(Chinese Taipei) Chang C-h (Chinese Taipei) Lee C-c | 21 | 21
PFQ | (Hong Kong) Leung S L (Hong Kong) Yuen S Y | 10 | 13
6 | (Thailand) J Kititharakul (Thailand) R Prajongjai | 21 | 21
(Malaysia) V Hoo (Malaysia) Lim C S | 10 | 13

Second round
(Indonesia) S F S Ramadhanti (Indonesia) R Sugiarto | 21 | 21
(Chinese Taipei) Chang C-h (Chinese Taipei) Lee C-c | 13 | 15
6 | (Thailand) J Kititharakul (Thailand) R Prajongjai | 11 | 21 | 17
(China) Du Y (China) Li WM | 21 | 18 | 21

Quarter-finals
(Indonesia) S F S Ramadhanti (Indonesia) R Sugiarto | 10 | 12
(China) Du Y (China) Li WM | 21 | 21

=== Bottom half ===
==== Section 3 ====
First Round
(South Korea) Baek H-n (South Korea) Lee Y-r | 17 | 17
(Hong Kong) Yeung N T (Hong Kong) Yeung P L | 21 | 21
(India) S Singhi (India) R Thaker | 15 | 11
7 | (Malaysia) P Tan (Malaysia) Thinaah M | 21 | 21
C1 | (Hong Kong) Fan K Y (Hong Kong) Yau M Y | 12 | 21 | 15
(Thailand) C Korepap (Thailand) J Sudjaipraparat | 21 | 18 | 21
PFQ | (Indonesia) M T Puspita Sari (Indonesia) R A Rose | 25 | 10 | 10
4 | (Japan) Y Fukushima (Japan) S Hirota | 23 | 21 | 21

Second Round
(Hong Kong) Yeung N T (Hong Kong) Yeung P L | 13 | 21
7 | (Malaysia) P Tan (Malaysia) Thinaah M | 21 | 23
(Thailand) C Korepap (Thailand) J Sudjaipraparat | 13 | 18
4 | (Japan) Y Fukushima (Japan) S Hirota | 21 | 21

Quarterfinals
7 | (Malaysia) P Tan (Malaysia) Thinaah M | 21 | 19 | 16
4 | (Japan) Y Fukushima (Japan) S Hirota | 14 | 21 | 21

==== Section 4 ====
First round
(Japan) R Iwanaga (Japan) K Nakanishi | 21 | 21
(Malaysia) Low Y Y (Malaysia) V Siow | 19 | 13
(Indonesia) F D Kusuma (Indonesia) A C Pratiwi | 17 | 11
(China) Zhang SX (China) Zheng Y | 21 | 21
(Maldives) A N Abdul Razzaq (Maldives) F N Abdul Razzaq | 5 | 10
2 | (South Korea) Lee S-h (South Korea) Shin S-c | 21 | 21

Second round
(Japan) R Iwanaga (Japan) K Nakanishi | 21 | 21
PFQ | (Vietnam) Đinh T P H (Vietnam) Phạm T K | 9 | 16
(China) Zhang SX (China) Zheng Y | 21 | 15
2 | (South Korea) Lee S-h (South Korea) Shin S-c | 23 | 21

Quarter-finals
(Japan) R Iwanaga (Japan) K Nakanishi | 21 | 21 | 21
2 | (South Korea) Lee S-h (South Korea) Shin S-c | 23 | 15 | 15

== Mixed doubles ==
=== Seeds ===
1. (China) Zheng Siwei / Huang Yaqiong (champions)
2. (Japan) Yuta Watanabe / Arisa Higashino (semi-finals)
3. (China) Wang Yilyu / Huang Dongping (final)
4. (Indonesia) Praveen Jordan / Melati Daeva Oktavianti (semi-finals)
5. (South Korea) Seo Seung-jae / Chae Yoo-jung (withdrew)
6. (Hong Kong) Tang Chun Man / Tse Ying Suet (first round)
7. (Malaysia) Tan Kian Meng / Lai Pei Jing (quarter-finals)
8. (Malaysia) Goh Soon Huat / Shevon Jemie Lai (second round)

=== Finals ===
Semifinals
1 | (China) Zheng Siwei (China) Huang Yaqiong | 21
4 | (Indonesia) Praveen Jordan (Indonesia) Melati Daeva Oktavianti | 8^{r}
3 | (China) Wang Yilyu (China) Huang Dongping | 21 | 24
2 | (Japan) Yuta Watanabe (Japan) Arisa Higashino | 12 | 22

Final
1 | (China) Zheng Siwei (China) Huang Yaqiong | 21 | 21
3 | (China) Wang Yilyu (China) Huang Dongping | 17 | 8

=== Top half ===
==== Section 1 ====
First Round
1 | (China) Zheng SW (China) Huang YQ | 21 | 22
(Thailand) R Makkasasithorn (Thailand) J Sudjaipraparat | 16 | 20
(Singapore) A Kwek (Singapore) Jin YJ
(Indonesia) A Maulana (Indonesia) M C Bandaso | w | / | o
8 | (Malaysia) Goh S H (Malaysia) S J Lai | 21 | 21
(Jordan) B A Alshannik (Jordan) D Amro | 9 | 9
(Japan) Y Kaneko (Japan) M Matsutomo | 21 | 21
(Hong Kong) Lee C H (Hong Kong) Ng T Y | 18 | 16

Second Round
1 | (China) Zheng SW (China) Huang YQ | 21 | 21
(Indonesia) A Maulana (Indonesia) M C Bandaso | 11 | 13
8 | (Malaysia) Goh S H (Malaysia) S J Lai | 19 | 21 | 13
(Japan) Y Kaneko (Japan) M Matsutomo | 21 | 16 | 21

Quarterfinals
1 | (China) Zheng SW (China) Huang YQ | 21 | 22
(Japan) Y Kaneko (Japan) M Matsutomo | 10 | 20

==== Section 2 ====
First Round
4 | (Indonesia) P Jordan (Indonesia) M D Oktavianti | 21 | 21
(India) V G Prasad (India) J Dewangan | 9 | 13
(Malaysia) Hoo P R (Malaysia) Cheah Y S | 23 | 12 | 20
(China) Feng YZ (China) Lin FL | 21 | 21 | 22
5 | (South Korea) Seo S-j (South Korea) Chae Y-j
(Japan) K Yamashita (Japan) N Shinoya | w | / | o
(Hong Kong) Chang T C (Hong Kong) Ng W Y | 15 | 21 | 23
(Philippines) A Morada (Philippines) T Pomar | 21 | 14 | 21

Second Round
4 | (Indonesia) P Jordan (Indonesia) M D Oktavianti | 22 | 16 | 21
(China) Feng YZ (China) Lin FL | 20 | 21 | 11
(Japan) K Yamashita (Japan) N Shinoya | 21 | 21
(Hong Kong) Chang T C (Hong Kong) Ng W Y | 15 | 17

Quarterfinals
4 | (Indonesia) P Jordan (Indonesia) M D Oktavianti | 21 | 22
(Japan) K Yamashita (Japan) N Shinoya | 17 | 20

=== Bottom half ===
==== Section 3 ====
First Round
(Maldives) H Z Shaheed (Maldives) F N Abdul Razzaq | w | / | o
(Japan) H Midorikawa (Japan) N Saito
(Indonesia) R Rivaldy (Indonesia) P H Mentari | 21 | 21
6 | (Hong Kong) Tang C M (Hong Kong) Tse Y S | 10 | 19
(Malaysia) Chen T J (Malaysia) Peck Y W | 21 | 21
(Philippines) S Padiz (Philippines) E Inlayo | 10 | 16
(Thailand) R Oupthong (Thailand) C Korepap | 10 | 10
3 | (China) Wang YL (China) Huang DP | 21 | 21

Second Round
(Maldives) H Z Shaheed (Maldives) F N Abdul Razzaq | 7 | 6
(Indonesia) R Rivaldy (Indonesia) P H Mentari | 21 | 21
(Malaysia) Chen T J (Malaysia) Peck Y W | 9 | 19
3 | (China) Wang YL (China) Huang DP | 21 | 21

Quarterfinals
(Indonesia) R Rivaldy (Indonesia) P H Mentari | 13 | 11
3 | (China) Wang YL (China) Huang DP | 21 | 21

==== Section 4 ====
First Round
(Hong Kong) Law C H (Hong Kong) Yeung N T | 15 | 17
(India) I Bhatnagar (India) T Crasto | 21 | 21
(South Korea) Kim W-h (South Korea) Jeong N-e | 21 | 8 | 11
7 | (Malaysia) Tan K M (Malaysia) Lai P J | 19 | 21 | 21
(Singapore) T Hee (Singapore) Tan W H | w | / | o
(Sri Lanka) S Dias (Sri Lanka) T Hendahewa
(Indonesia) R N Kusharjanto (Indonesia) L A Kusumawati | 5 | 12
2 | (Japan) Y Watanabe (Japan) A Higashino | 21 | 21

Second Round
(India) I Bhatnagar (India) T Crasto | 18 | 18
7 | (Malaysia) Tan K M (Malaysia) Lai P J | 21 | 21
(Singapore) T Hee (Singapore) Tan W H | 20 | 16
2 | (Japan) Y Watanabe (Japan) A Higashino | 22 | 21

Quarterfinals
7 | (Malaysia) Tan K M (Malaysia) Lai P J | 18 | 5
2 | (Japan) Y Watanabe (Japan) A Higashino | 21 | 21
