= 2022 Badminton Asia Team Championships – Women's team event =

Women's team at the 2022 Badminton Asia Team Championships
- Venue: Setia City Convention Centre
- Location: Shah Alam, Selangor, Malaysia
- Dates: 15–20 February 2022
- Nations: 7

Medalists
gold medal	Malaysia
silver medal	Indonesia
bronze medal	South Korea
bronze medal	Singapore

The women's team event at the 2022 Badminton Asia Team Championships took place from 15 to 20 February at the Setia City Convention Centre in Shah Alam, Selangor, Malaysia. Japan were the defending champions.

== Seeds ==
The seeds were announced on 25 January 2022 based on the BWF World Team Rankings.

1. Japan (semi-finals)
2. South Korea (final)

== Group stage ==
The draw was held on 8 February 2022. The women's team group stages consist of 2 groups: Y and Z.

Group Y	Group Z
Malaysia; Japan (1); India; Singapore (WDN)	Indonesia; South Korea (2); Hong Kong; Kazakhstan

== Group stage ==
All times are Malaysia Standard Time (UTC+08:00).

=== Group Y ===
Pos	Team	Pld	W	L	MF	MA	MD	GF	GA	GD	PF	PA	PD	Pts	Qualification
1	Malaysia (H)	2	2	0	6	4	+2	12	9	+3	387	343	+44	2	Knockout stage
2	Japan	2	1	1	6	4	+2	13	9	+4	420	367	+53	1	Knockout stage
3	India	2	0	2	3	7	−4	8	15	−7	351	448	−97	0	

Source: TS
(H) Host

==== Japan vs Malaysia ====
Japan
2
Setia City Convention Centre, Court 3
15 February 2022, 16:00

Malaysia
3

			1	2	3
1	(Japan) (Malaysia)	Natsuki Nidaira; Kisona Selvaduray	21; 12	21; 16
2	(Japan) (Malaysia)	Riko Gunji; Eoon Qi Xuan	21; 17	21; 7
3	(Japan) (Malaysia)	Hina Akechi; Siti Nurshuhaini	16; 21	20; 22
4	(Japan) (Malaysia)	Rui Hirokami / Yuna Kato; Valeree Siow / Pearly Tan	22; 24	18; 21
5	(Japan) (Malaysia)	Hina Akechi / Riko Gunji; Anna Cheong / Teoh Mei Xing	12; 21	5; 21

==== India vs Malaysia ====
India
2
Setia City Convention Centre, Court 3
16 February 2022, 16:00

Malaysia
3

			1	2	3
1	(India) (Malaysia)	Aakarshi Kashyap; Kisona Selvaduray	16; 21	21; 18	16; 21
2	(India) (Malaysia)	Khushi Gupta / Riza Mehreen; Valeree Siow / Pearly Tan	1; 21	6; 21
3	(India) (Malaysia)	Ashmita Chaliha; Siti Nurshuhaini	21; 11	21; 19
4	(India) (Malaysia)	Arul Bala Radhakrishnan / Nila Valluvan; Anna Cheong / Teoh Mei Xing	10; 21	12; 21
5	(India) (Malaysia)	Tara Shah; Myisha Mohd Khairul	21; 16	21; 15

==== Japan vs India ====
Japan
4
Setia City Convention Centre, Court 3
18 February 2022, 10:00

India
1

			1	2	3
1	(Japan) (India)	Natsuki Nidaira; Aakarshi Kashyap	21; 13	18; 21	21; 15
2	(Japan) (India)	Riko Gunji; Ashmita Chaliha	17; 21	21; 10	19; 21
3	(Japan) (India)	Rui Hirokami / Yuna Kato; Khushi Gupta / Simran Shingi	21; 15	21; 16
4	(Japan) (India)	Hina Akechi; Tara Shah	21; 12	21; 16
5	(Japan) (India)	Riko Gunji / Natsuki Nidaira; Arul Bala Radhakrishnan / Nila Valluvan	21; 10	21; 15

=== Group Z ===
Pos	Team	Pld	W	L	MF	MA	MD	GF	GA	GD	PF	PA	PD	Pts	Qualification
1	Indonesia	3	3	0	12	3	+9	25	7	+18	652	420	+232	3	Knockout stage
2	South Korea	3	2	1	12	3	+9	24	10	+14	656	513	+143	2	Knockout stage
3	Hong Kong	3	1	2	6	9	−3	17	19	−2	641	585	+56	1	
4	Kazakhstan	3	0	3	0	15	−15	0	30	−30	199	630	−431	0	

Source: TS

==== Indonesia vs Hong Kong ====
Indonesia
4
Setia City Convention Centre, Court 1
15 February 2022, 10:00

Hong Kong
1

			1	2	3
1	(Indonesia) (Hong Kong)	Gregoria Mariska Tunjung; Cheung Ying Mei	21; 16	21; 12
2	(Indonesia) (Hong Kong)	Febriana Dwipuji Kusuma / Amalia Cahaya Pratiwi; Yeung Nga Ting / Yeung Pui Lam	19; 21	21; 19	21; 23
3	(Indonesia) (Hong Kong)	Putri Kusuma Wardani; Yeung Sum Yee	21; 14	21; 5
4	(Indonesia) (Hong Kong)	Lanny Tria Mayasari / Jesita Putri Miantoro; Fan Ka Yan / Yau Mau Ying	12; 21	21; 14	21; 19
5	(Indonesia) (Hong Kong)	Stephanie Widjaja; Saloni Samirbhai Mehta	21; 18	21; 13

==== South Korea vs Kazakhstan ====
South Korea
5
Setia City Convention Centre, Court 2
15 February 2022, 10:00

Kazakhstan
0

			1	2	3
1	(South Korea) (Kazakhstan)	Lee Se-yeon; Aisha Zhumabek	21; 7	21; 12
2	(South Korea) (Kazakhstan)	Kim Joo-eun; Kamila Smagulova	21; 8	21; 10
3	(South Korea) (Kazakhstan)	Park Min-jeong; Nargiza Rakhmetullayeva	21; 10	21; 6
4	(South Korea) (Kazakhstan)	Baek Ha-na / Kim Min-ji; Arina Sazonova / Kamila Smagulova	21; 8	21; 5
5	(South Korea) (Kazakhstan)	Lee Seo-jin / Seong Seung-yeon; Nargiza Rakhmetullayeva / Aisha Zhumabek	21; 6	21; 4

==== South Korea vs Hong Kong ====
South Korea
5
Setia City Convention Centre, Court 1
16 February 2022, 10:00

Hong Kong
0

			1	2	3
1	(South Korea) (Hong Kong)	Sim Yu-jin; Cheung Ying Mei	21; 18	13; 21	21; 11
2	(South Korea) (Hong Kong)	Baek Ha-na / Seong Seung-yeon; Yeung Nga Ting / Yeung Pui Lam	21; 17	21; 16
3	(South Korea) (Hong Kong)	Lee Se-yeon; Yeung Sum Yee	21; 17	19; 21	21; 13
4	(South Korea) (Hong Kong)	Kim Min-ji / Park Min-jeong; Leung Sze Lok / Yuen Sin Ying	17; 21	21; 12	21; 12
5	(South Korea) (Hong Kong)	Lee Seo-jin; Lo Sin Yan	21; 16	17; 21	22; 20

==== Indonesia vs Kazakhstan ====
Indonesia
5
Setia City Convention Centre, Court 2
16 February 2022, 10:00

Kazakhstan
0

			1	2	3
1	(Indonesia) (Kazakhstan)	Putri Kusuma Wardani; Aisha Zhumabek	21; 8	21; 7
2	(Indonesia) (Kazakhstan)	Bilqis Prasista; Kamila Smagulova	21; 4	21; 6
3	(Indonesia) (Kazakhstan)	Saifi Rizka Nurhidayah; Nargiza Rakhmetullayeva	21; 4	21; 8
4	(Indonesia) (Kazakhstan)	Febriana Dwipuji Kusuma / Amalia Cahaya Pratiwi; Arina Sazonova / Aisha Zhumabek	21; 3	21; 5
5	(Indonesia) (Kazakhstan)	Lanny Tria Mayasari / Jesita Putri Miantoro; Nargiza Rakhmetullayeva / Kamila Smagulova	21; 6	21; 5

==== Hong Kong vs Kazakhstan ====
Hong Kong
5
Setia City Convention Centre, Court 3
17 February 2022, 10:00

Kazakhstan
0

			1	2	3
1	(Hong Kong) (Kazakhstan)	Yeung Sum Yee; Aisha Zhumabek	21; 11	21; 6
2	(Hong Kong) (Kazakhstan)	Saloni Samirbhai Mehta; Kamila Smagulova	21; 12	21; 10
3	(Hong Kong) (Kazakhstan)	Lo Sin Yan; Nargiza Rakhmetullayeva	21; 4	21; 6
4	(Hong Kong) (Kazakhstan)	Fan Ka Yan / Yau Mau Ying; Arina Sazonova / Kamila Smagulova	21; 7	21; 4
5	(Hong Kong) (Kazakhstan)	Leung Sze Lok / Yuen Sin Ying; Nargiza Rakhmetullayeva / Aisha Zhumabek	21; 2	21; 5

==== South Korea vs Indonesia ====
South Korea
2
Setia City Convention Centre, Court 3
17 February 2022, 16:00

Indonesia
3

			1	2	3
1	(South Korea) (Indonesia)	Sim Yu-jin; Gregoria Mariska Tunjung	6; 21	18; 21
2	(South Korea) (Indonesia)	Baek Ha-na / Seong Seung-yeon; Febriana Dwipuji Kusuma / Amalia Cahaya Pratiwi	22; 20	21; 19
3	(South Korea) (Indonesia)	Lee Se-yeon; Putri Kusuma Wardani	21; 16	21; 19
4	(South Korea) (Indonesia)	Kim Min-ji / Lee Seo-jin; Nita Violina Marwah / Lanny Tria Mayasari	16; 21	20; 22
5	(South Korea) (Indonesia)	Kim Joo-eun; Stephanie Widjaja	11; 21	13; 21

== Knockout stage ==
=== Bracket ===
Semi-finals
19 February 10:00
Malaysia	0
South Korea (2)	3
19 February 10:00
Japan (1)
Indonesia	w/o

Final
20 February 10:00
South Korea (2)	1
Indonesia	3

=== Semi-finals ===
==== Indonesia vs Japan ====
Indonesia
-
Setia City Convention Centre, Court 1
19 February 2022, 10:00

Japan
Withdrew

		1	2	3
1	(Indonesia) (Japan)
2	(Indonesia) (Japan)
3	(Indonesia) (Japan)
4	(Indonesia) (Japan)
5	(Indonesia) (Japan)

==== South Korea vs Malaysia ====
South Korea
3
Setia City Convention Centre, Court 1
19 February 2022, 10:00

Malaysia
0

			1	2	3
1	(South Korea) (Malaysia)	Sim Yu-jin; Kisona Selvaduray	21; 16	21; 17
2	(South Korea) (Malaysia)	Baek Ha-na / Seong Seung-yeon; Valeree Siow / Pearly Tan	21; 15	21; 14
3	(South Korea) (Malaysia)	Lee Se-yeon; Siti Nurshuhaini	21; 11	15; 21	21; 13
4	(South Korea) (Malaysia)	Kim Min-ji / Park Min-jeong; Anna Cheong / Teoh Mei Xing				not played
5	(South Korea) (Malaysia)	Lee Seo-jin; Myisha Mohd Khairul				not played

==== Indonesia vs South Korea ====
Indonesia
3
Setia City Convention Centre, Court 1
20 February 2022, 10:00

South Korea
1

			1	2	3
1	(Indonesia) (South Korea)	Gregoria Mariska Tunjung; Sim Yu-jin	21; 9	21; 10
2	(Indonesia) (South Korea)	Febriana Dwipuji Kusuma / Amalia Cahaya Pratiwi; Baek Ha-na / Seong Seung-yeon	15; 21	21; 14	14; 21
3	(Indonesia) (South Korea)	Putri Kusuma Wardani; Lee Se-yeon	21; 10	21; 18
4	(Indonesia) (South Korea)	Nita Violina Marwah / Lanny Tria Mayasari; Kim Min-ji / Park Min-jeong	23; 21	21; 11
5	(Indonesia) (South Korea)	Stephanie Widjaja; Lee Seo-jin				not played

== Final ranking ==
Pos	Team	Pld	W	L	Pts	MD	GD	PD	Final result
1st place, gold medalist(s)	Indonesia	5	5	0	10	+11	+23	+275	Champions
2nd place, silver medalist(s)	South Korea	5	5	1	10	+10	+14	+134	Runners-up
3rd place, bronze medalist(s)	Japan	5	1	2	2	+2	+4	+53	Eliminated in semi-finals
3rd place, bronze medalist(s)	Malaysia	5	2	2	4	−1	−2	+10	Eliminated in semi-finals
5	Hong Kong	4	2	2	4	−3	−2	+56	Eliminated in group stage
6	India	4	2	2	4	−4	−7	−97	Eliminated in group stage
7	Kazakhstan	4	2	2	4	−15	−30	−431	Eliminated in group stage
