= 2022 Uber Cup qualification =

Tournament details
- Dates: 14–20 February 2022
- Venue: BA: Setia City Convention Centre; BCA: Lugogo Arena; BE: Lahti Energia Arena; BO: Badminton North Harbour Center; BPA: Mundo Imperial
- Location: BA: Selangor, Malaysia; BCA: Kampala, Uganda; BE: Lahti, Finland; BO: Auckland, New Zealand; BPA: Acapulco, Mexico

The 2022 Uber Cup qualification process is a series of tournaments organised by the five BWF confederations to decide 14 of the 16 teams which will play in the 2022 Uber Cup, with Thailand qualifying automatically as hosts, and China qualifying automatically as trophy holder.

== Qualification process ==
The number of teams participating in the final tournament is 16. The allocation of slots for each confederation is the same allocation from 2016 tournament; 4 from each Asia and Europe, and 1 from each Africa, Oceania and Pan Am. Two automatic qualifiers are the host and defending champion. The remaining quota will be filled by world team ranking.

=== Qualified teams ===
Country	Confederation	Qualified as	Qualified on	World Team Rankings	Final appearance
Thailand	Badminton Asia	Host country	29 November 2018	4th	8th
China	Badminton Asia	2020 Uber Cup winners	16 October 2021	3rd	20th
Indonesia	Badminton Asia	2022 Asia Team Championships winners	16 February 2022	5th	26th
South Korea	Badminton Asia	2022 Asia Team Championships runner-up	16 February 2022	2nd	20th
Malaysia	Badminton Asia	2022 Asia Team Championships semifinalists	16 February 2022	9th	14th
Egypt	Badminton Africa	2022 All Africa Team Championships winners	17 February 2022	27th	2nd
Japan	Badminton Asia	2022 Asia Team Championships semifinalists	18 February 2022	1st	26th
United States	Badminton Pan Am	2022 Pan Am Female Cup winners	20 February 2022	15th	12th
Denmark	Badminton Europe	Best ranking (Europe)	22 February 2022	6th	22nd
Spain	Badminton Europe	Best ranking (Europe)	22 February 2022	10th	3rd
France	Badminton Europe	Best ranking (Europe)	22 February 2022	12th	3rd
Germany^{1}	Badminton Europe	Best ranking (Europe)	22 February 2022	14th	11th
Australia	Badminton Oceania	Best ranking (Oceania)	22 February 2022	24th	9th
India	Badminton Asia	Best ranking (overall)	22 February 2022	7th	8th
Chinese Taipei	Badminton Asia	Best ranking (overall)	22 February 2022	8th	8th
Canada	Badminton Pan Am	Best ranking (Overall)	22 February 2022	11th	13th
Disqualified
Russia^{1}	Badminton Europe	Best ranking (Europe)	22 February 2022	13th	—N/a

- ^1 Russia suspended from any BWF events until further notice. Therefore, the quota was given to Germany as the next highest ranked team for Europe.

== Confederation qualification ==
=== Badminton Confederation of Africa ===
The qualification for the African teams was held from 14 to 17 February 2022, at the Lugogo Arena, in Kampala, Uganda. The winners of the African qualification will qualified for the Uber Cup.

==== Teams in contention ====
Teams qualified for the Group stage

- Algeria
- Egypt
- Mauritius
- Réunion
- South Africa
- Uganda
- Zimbabwe

==== First round (group stage) ====
Advance to Knockout stage

Group A

Pos	Team	Pld	Pts
1	Mauritius	2	1
2	South Africa	2	1
3	Réunion	2	1

Source: TS
Group B

Pos	Team	Pld	Pts
1	Uganda (H)	3	2
2	Egypt	3	2
3	Algeria	3	2
4	Zimbabwe	3	0

Source: TS
(H) Host

==== Second round (knockout stage) ====
Semi-finals
16 February
Mauritius	0
Egypt	3
16 February
South Africa	0
Uganda	3

Final
17 February
Egypt	3
Uganda	1

=== Badminton Asia ===
The qualification for the Asian teams was held from 15 to 20 February 2022, at the Setia City Convention Centre in Shah Alam, Selangor, Malaysia. The semifinalist of the Asian qualification will qualified for the Uber Cup.

==== Teams in contention ====
Teams qualified for the Group stage

- Hong Kong
- India
- Indonesia
- Japan
- Kazakhstan
- South Korea
- Malaysia

==== First round (group stage) ====
Advance to Knockout stage

Group Y

Pos	Team	Pld	Pts
1	Malaysia (H)	2	2
2	Japan	2	1
3	India	2	0

Source: TS
(H) Host
Group Z

Pos	Team	Pld	Pts
1	Indonesia	3	3
2	South Korea	3	2
3	Hong Kong	3	1
4	Kazakhstan	3	0

Source: TS

==== Second round (knockout stage) ====
Semi-finals
19 February 10:00
Malaysia	0
South Korea (2)	3
19 February 10:00
Japan (1)
Indonesia	w/o

Final
20 February 10:00
South Korea (2)	1
Indonesia	3

=== Badminton Europe ===
The 2022 European Men’s & Women’s Team Championships were cancelled due to Covid-19. Therefore, the qualification for European women's teams are through World Ranking. The best four of the European women's team rankings will qualified for the Uber Cup.

=== Badminton Oceania ===
The 2022 Oceania Badminton Team Championships were cancelled due to Covid-19. Therefore, the qualification for Oceania teams are through World Ranking. The best one of the Oceania women's team rankings will qualified for the Uber Cup.

=== Badminton Pan Am ===
The qualification for the Pan Am teams was held from 17 to 20 February 2022, at the Mundo Imperial in Acapulco, Mexico. The winner of the Pan Am qualification will qualified for the Uber Cup.

==== Teams in contention ====
Teams qualified for the Group stage

- Brazil
- Canada
- Guatemala
- Mexico
- Peru
- United States

==== First round (group stage) ====
Advance to First to fourth place

Group A

Pos	Team	Pld	Pts
1	Canada	2	2
2	Guatemala	2	1
3	Peru	2	0

Source: TS
Group B

Pos	Team	Pld	Pts
1	United States	2	2
2	Brazil	2	1
3	Mexico	2	0

Source: TS

==== Second round (knockout stage) ====
Semi-finals
19 February
Canada	3
Guatemala	0
19 February
Brazil	0
United States	3

Final
20 February
Canada	0
United States	3
Third place
20 February
Guatemala	0
Brazil	3

== World team rankings ==
=== Summary of qualification ===
Below is the chart of the BWF World Team Ranking calculated by adding World Ranking points of top three Women's Singles players and top two Women's Doubles pairs on 22 February 2022.

Rank	Conf.	Nation	Points	Continental results	Qualification status
1	BA	Japan	463,190	Semifinalists	Qualified as BA semifinalists
2	BA	South Korea	408,712	Runner-up	Qualified as BA runner-up
3	BA	China	404,011	Trophy Holder	Qualified as trophy holder
4	BA	Thailand	364,105		Qualified as host country
5	BA	Indonesia	260,663	Winner	Qualified as the winner of BA
6	BE	Denmark	259,238		Qualified by ranking (Europe)
7	BA	India	250,156	Group stage	Qualified by ranking (overall)
8	BA	Chinese Taipei	244,011		Qualified by ranking (overall)
9	BA	Malaysia	204,277	Semifinals	Qualified as BA semifinalists
10	BE	Spain	201,313		Qualified by ranking (Europe)
11	BPA	Canada	199,003	Runner-up	Qualified by ranking (overall)
12	BE	France	172,959		Qualified by ranking (Europe)
13	BE	Russia	160,434		Qualified by ranking (Europe), Disqualified^{1}
14	BE	Germany	155,414		Qualified by ranking (Europe)^{1}
15	BPA	United States	152,323	Winner	Qualified as the winner of BPA
16	BA	Hong Kong	146,758	Group stage	
17	BE	England	139,268		
18	BE	Turkey	136,710		
19	BE	Bulgaria	134,570		
20	BE	Netherlands	133,399		
21	BE	Scotland	108,623		
22	BA	Singapore	108,590		
23	BE	Ukraine	101,977		
24	BO	Australia	101,926		Qualified by ranking (Oceania)
25	BE	Switzerland	101,411		
26	BE	Sweden	97,850		
27	BCA	Egypt	96,089	Winner	Qualified as the winner of BCA
28	BPA	Peru	92,570	6th Place	
29	BPA	Brazil	90,846	3rd Place	
30	BE	Estonia	83,981		
31	BE	Hungary	76,210		
32	BPA	Guatemala	74,281	4th Place	
33	BE	Czech Republic	73,201		
34	BA	Vietnam	66,831		
35	BE	Poland	65,161		
36	BPA	Mexico	64,258	5th Place	
37	BE	Belgium	61,502		
38	BE	Ireland	59,144		
39	BE	Italy	56,490		
40	BCA	Nigeria	50,813		
41	BCA	South Africa	49,043	Semifinals	
42	BA	Iran	43,940		
43	BE	Israel	42,645		
44	BCA	Algeria	42,387	Group stage	
45	BCA	Mauritius	40,934	Semifinals	
46	BA	Maldives	39,300		
47	BE	Slovakia	39,023		
48	BCA	Uganda	37,764	Runner-up	
49	BPA	Dominican Republic	36,410		
50	BE	Slovenia	36,089		
50+ participants
72	BA	Kazakhstan	14,052	Group stage	
81	BCA	Réunion	9,860	Group stage	
106	BCA	Zimbabwe	3,510	Group stage	

- ^1 Russia suspended from any BWF events until further notice. Therefore, the quota was given to Germany as the next highest ranked team for Europe.
