= Siti Nurshuhaini =

Malaysian badminton player (born 2004)

Personal information
- Born: Siti Nurshuhaini Azman; 1 September 2004 (age 22) Rawang, Selangor, Malaysia
- Height: 1.54 m (5 ft 1 in)

Sport
- Country: Malaysia
- Sport: Badminton
- Handedness: Right

Women's singles & doubles
- Highest ranking: 162 (WS 15 November 2022); 679 (WD with Khor Jing Wen) (25 May 2021)
- Current ranking: 213 (11 June 2024)
- BWF profile
Medal record
Women's badminton
Representing Malaysia
Asia Team Championships
Bronze medal – third place	2022 Selangor	Women's team

Siti Nurshuhaini Azman (born 1 September 2004) is a Malaysian badminton player. Her best result was being the runner-up of the women's singles event in the 2021 Czech Open. She was nominated to represent Malaysia in the 2020 Uber Cup.

== Personal life ==
Siti was born into a family of badminton players and took up the sport at the age of five, with six out of seven of her siblings being players who have made a name for themselves on the local scene. One of her siblings, Muhammad Nurfirdaus Azman, is also currently a doubles player in the national senior team. She used to train under her father who is the founder and coach of Azman Amman Badminton Academy.

== Achievement ==
=== BWF International Series (1 title, 2 runners-up) ===
Women singles

Year	Tournament	Opponent	Score	Result
2021	Czech Open	(Indonesia) Putri Kusuma Wardani	16–21, 5–21	(silver) Runner-up
2022	Dutch International	(Malaysia) Myisha Mohd Khairul	19–21, 21–18, 19–21	(silver) Runner-up
2024	Lithuanian International	(India) Purva Barve	22–20, 23–21	(gold) Winner

BWF International Challenge tournament
BWF International Series tournament
BWF Future Series tournament
