= Myisha Mohd Khairul =

Malaysian badminton player (born 2002)

Personal information
- Born: Myisha Mohd Khairul; 27 July 2002 (age 24) Johor Bahru, Johor, Malaysia
- Height: 1.64 m (5 ft 5 in)

Sport
- Country: Malaysia
- Sport: Badminton
- Handedness: Right

Women's singles
- Highest ranking: 120 (20 December 2022)
- BWF profile
Medal record
Women's badminton
Representing Malaysia
Asia Team Championships
Bronze medal – third place	2022 Selangor	Women's team

Myisha Mohd Khairul (born 27 July 2002) is a Malaysian badminton player. She was among the players in the Malaysian team who helped bring home a bronze medal at the 2022 Badminton Asia Team Championships.

== Personal life ==
Myisha has two other siblings and spent most of her life in her hometown, Johor Bahru. Her parents initially wanted her to become a ballerina at a young age. She tried to pursue a career in taekwondo but she did not enjoy the sport because it was too rough. At the age of 9, she took up badminton after accompanying her brother to his first badminton class.

== Career ==
=== 2022: First international title and leaving BAM ===
In April, Myisha captured her first international title at the Dutch International, becoming the first women's singles player from Malaysia to win the title.

In December, she took to social media to announce her premature departure from the national team after she was dropped by the Badminton Association of Malaysia (BAM) for her underwhelming performances. She had served the senior team for only two years.

== Achievements ==
=== BWF International Challenge/Series (1 title) ===
Women singles

Year	Tournament	Opponent	Score	Result
2022	Dutch International	(Malaysia) Siti Nurshuhaini	21–19, 18–21, 21–19	(gold) Winner

BWF International Challenge tournament
BWF International Series tournament
BWF Future Series tournament
