= 2026 Badminton Asia Team Championships squads =

This article provides the confirmed squad list for the 2026 Badminton Asia Team Championships. The rankings used to determine the order of play are based on the BWF World Rankings as of January 6, 2026. The tournament will feature 12 teams competing in the men's category and 11 teams in the women's category.

== Men's Teams ==
=== Group A ===
China

Name	Date of Birth (Age)	Ranking of event	
Name	Date of Birth (Age)	MS	MD
Chen Junting			
Dong Tianyao			
He Jiting			
Hu Keyuan			
Hu Zhe'an			
Lin Xiangyi			
Liu Junrong			
Ren Xiangyu			
Wang Zhengxing			
Zhu Xuanchen			

Thailand

Thailand announced their squad on 15 January 2026.

Name	Date of Birth (Age)	Ranking of event	
Name	Date of Birth (Age)	MS	MD
Panitchaphon Teeraratsakul	11 November 2004 (aged 21)	47	—N/a
Kantaphon Wangcharoen	18 September 1998 (aged 27)	56	—N/a
Puritat Arree	28 January 2003 (aged 23)	146	—N/a
Tanawat Yimjit	7 December 2004 (aged 21)	381	—N/a
Pakkapon Teeraratsakul	11 November 2004 (aged 21)	—N/a	48
Peeratchai Sukphun	31 August 2004 (aged 21)	—N/a	48
Worrapol Thongsa-nga	29 October 1995 (aged 30)	—N/a	60
Chaloempon Charoenkitamorn	15 April 1997 (aged 28)	—N/a	60
Tanadon Punpanich	1 October 2002 (aged 23)	—N/a	61
Pharanyu Kaosamaang	6 March 2003 (aged 22)	—N/a	61

Macau

Name	Date of Birth (Age)	Ranking of event	
Name	Date of Birth (Age)	MS	MD
Fei Long Ao			
Lok Chong Leong			
Ka Seng Ng			
Chi Chon Pui			
Pang Fong Pui			
Chon In Tong			
Kok Weng Vong			

=== Group B ===
Chinese Taipei

Name	Date of Birth (Age)	Ranking of event	
Name	Date of Birth (Age)	MS	MD
Chi Yu-jen			
Chiu Hsiang-chieh			
Lee Chia-hao			
Lee Fang-chih			
Lee Fang-jen			
Lee Jhe-huei			
Lin Chun-yi			
Wang Chi-lin			
Wang Tzu-wei			
Yang Po-hsuan			

South Korea

Name	Date of Birth (Age)	Ranking of event	
Name	Date of Birth (Age)	MS	MD
Cho Hyeon-woo			
Cho Song-hyun			
Choi Ji-hoon			
Jin Yong			
Kang Min-hyuk			
Ki Dong-ju			
Kim Won-ho			
Park Sang-yong			
Seo Seung-jae			
Yoo Tae-bin			

=== Group C ===
Japan

Japan announced their squad on 19 December 2025.

Name	Date of Birth (Age)	Ranking of event	
Name	Date of Birth (Age)	MS	MD
Kenta Nishimoto	30 August 1994 (aged 31)	14	—N/a
Yushi Tanaka	5 October 1999 (aged 26)	19	—N/a
Koki Watanabe	29 January 1999 (aged 27)	25	—N/a
Yudai Okimoto	28 May 2005 (aged 20)	42	—N/a
Takuro Hoki	14 August 1995 (aged 30)	—N/a	11
Yugo Kobayashi	10 July 1995 (aged 30)	—N/a	11
Kakeru Kumagai	5 January 2002 (aged 24)	—N/a	34
Hiroki Nishi	21 March 2003 (aged 22)	—N/a	34
Takumi Nomura	7 August 1997 (aged 28)	—N/a	35
Yuichi Shimogami	5 March 1998 (aged 27)	—N/a	35

India

India announced their squad on 6 December 2025.

Name	Date of Birth (Age)	Ranking of event	
Name	Date of Birth (Age)	MS	MD
Lakshya Sen	16 August 2001 (aged 24)	13	—N/a
Ayush Shetty	3 May 2005 (aged 20)	32	—N/a
Kidambi Srikanth	7 February 1993 (aged 32)	34	—N/a
Prannoy H. S.	17 July 1992 (aged 33)	36	—N/a
Tharun Mannepalli	24 August 2001 (aged 24)	43	—N/a
Satwiksairaj Rankireddy	13 August 2000 (aged 25)	—N/a	3
Chirag Shetty	4 July 1997 (aged 28)	—N/a	3
Pruthvi Roy	13 July 2002 (aged 23)	—N/a	46
Sai Pratheek	3 May 2000 (aged 25)	—N/a	46
Hariharan Amsakarunan	18 May 2003 (aged 22)	—N/a	55

Singapore

Singapore's team lineup was announced by Badminton Asia on 17 January 2026.

Name	Date of Birth (Age)	Ranking of event	
Name	Date of Birth (Age)	MS	MD
Loh Kean Yew	26 June 1997 (aged 28)	10	—N/a
Jason Teh	25 August 2000 (aged 25)	23	—N/a
Joel Koh	23 December 2000 (aged 25)	157	—N/a
Ryan Tan	28 July 2004 (aged 21)	843	—N/a
Wesley Koh	13 July 2002 (aged 23)	—N/a	50
Junsuke Kubo	11 May 2002 (aged 23)	—N/a	50
Donovan Wee	15 January 2003 (aged 23)	—N/a	76
Howin Wong	17 April 2001 (aged 24)	—N/a	76
Nge Joo Jie	7 January 2004 (aged 22)	—N/a	270
Terry Hee	6 June 1995 (aged 30)	—N/a	—N/a

=== Group D ===
Indonesia

Name	Date of Birth (Age)	Ranking of event	
Name	Date of Birth (Age)	MS	MD
Zaki Ubaidillah	26 June 2007 (aged 18)	46	—N/a
Prahdiska Bagas Shujiwo	2 September 2005 (aged 20)	47	—N/a
Anthony Sinisuka Ginting	20 October 1996 (aged 29)	76	—N/a
Richie Duta Richardo	23 November 2007 (aged 18)	125	—N/a
Muhammad Rian Ardianto	13 February 1996 (aged 29)	—N/a	17
Leo Rolly Carnando	29 July 2001 (aged 24)	—N/a	20
Bagas Maulana	20 July 1998 (aged 27)	—N/a	20
Raymond Indra	24 April 2004 (aged 21)	—N/a	23
Nikolaus Joaquin	14 September 2005 (aged 20)	—N/a	23
Rahmat Hidayat	17 June 2003 (aged 22)	—N/a	81

Malaysia

Name	Date of Birth (Age)	Ranking of event	
Name	Date of Birth (Age)	MS	MD
Justin Hoh	1 April 2004 (aged 21)	37	—N/a
Aidil Sholeh	9 January 2000 (aged 26)	43	—N/a
Eogene Ewe	18 February 2005 (aged 20)	85	—N/a
Kong Wei Xiang	5 September 2008 (aged 17)	343	—N/a
Junaidi Arif	6 June 2002 (aged 23)	—N/a	19
Yap Roy King	10 February 2001 (aged 24)	—N/a	19
Choong Hon Jian	2 July 2000 (aged 25)	—N/a	34
Muhammad Haikal	26 December 2002 (aged 23)	—N/a	34
Kang Khai Xing	25 April 2006 (aged 19)	—N/a	36
Aaron Tai	27 October 2006 (aged 19)	—N/a	36

== Women's team ==
=== Group W ===
China

Name	Date of Birth (Age)	Ranking of event	
Name	Date of Birth (Age)	WS	WD
Chen Fanshutian			
Gao Fangjie			
Han Qianxi			
Jia Yifan			
Liu Jiayue			
Luo Yi			
Wang Tingge			
Xu Wenjing			
Yuan Anqi			
Zhang Shuxian			

Malaysia

Name	Date of Birth (Age)	Ranking of event	
Name	Date of Birth (Age)	WS	WD
Letshanaa Karupathevan	19 August 2003 (aged 22)	38	—N/a
Wong Ling Ching	7 October 2003 (aged 22)	43	—N/a
Siti Zulaikha	26 July 2006 (aged 19)	90	—N/a
Oo Shan Zi	5 January 2007 (aged 19)	160	—N/a
Ong Xin Yee	23 October 2006 (aged 19)	—N/a	25
Carmen Ting	8 June 2006 (aged 19)	—N/a	25
Chong Jie Yu	8 December 2005 (aged 20)	—N/a	74
Vanessa Ng	18 March 2003 (aged 22)	—N/a	74
Low Zi Yu	21 August 2010 (aged 15)	—N/a	288
Noraqilah Maisarah	11 July 2007 (aged 18)	—N/a	288

=== Group X ===
Japan

Japan announced their squad on 19 December 2025.

Name	Date of Birth (Age)	Ranking of event	
Name	Date of Birth (Age)	WS	WD
Riko Gunji	31 July 2002 (aged 23)	27	—N/a
Hina Akechi	14 March 2005 (aged 20)	34	—N/a
Yuzuno Watanabe	9 January 2010 (aged 16)	—N/a	—N/a
Kie Nakanishi	24 December 1995 (aged 30)	—N/a	7
Arisa Igarashi	1 August 1996 (aged 29)	—N/a	23
Chiharu Shida	29 April 1997 (aged 28)	—N/a	23
Hinata Suzuki	26 March 2002 (aged 23)	—N/a	41
Nao Yamakita	30 October 2005 (aged 20)	—N/a	41
Miyu Takahashi	14 May 2002 (aged 23)	—N/a	52
~~Kaoru Sugiyama~~	~~6 June 2003 (aged 22)~~	~~54~~	—N/a

Indonesia

Name	Date of Birth (Age)	Ranking of event	
Name	Date of Birth (Age)	WS	WD
Thalita Ramadhani Wiryawan	21 September 2007 (aged 18)	72	—N/a
Mutiara Ayu Puspitasari	7 May 2005 (aged 20)	75	—N/a
Ni Kadek Dhinda Amartya Pratiwi	13 June 2006 (aged 19)	82	—N/a
Ester Nurumi Tri Wardoyo	26 August 2004 (aged 21)	153	—N/a
Febriana Dwipuji Kusuma	20 February 2001 (aged 24)	—N/a	10
Amallia Cahaya Pratiwi	14 October 2001 (aged 24)	—N/a	10
Siti Fadia Silva Ramadhanti	16 November 2000 (aged 25)	—N/a	26
Meilysa Trias Puspita Sari	11 May 2004 (aged 21)	—N/a	31
Rachel Allessya Rose	30 June 2004 (aged 21)	—N/a	31
Febi Setianingrum	29 February 2004 (aged 21)	—N/a	60

=== Group Y ===
Thailand

Thailand announced their squad on 15 January 2026.

Name	Date of Birth (Age)	Ranking of event	
Name	Date of Birth (Age)	WS	WD
Busanan Ongbamrungphan	22 March 1996 (aged 29)	19	—N/a
Pitchamon Opatniputh	4 January 2007 (aged 19)	37	—N/a
Pornpicha Choeikeewong	24 January 2003 (aged 23)	39	—N/a
Anyapat Phichitpreechasak	10 May 2008 (aged 17)	330	—N/a
Tidapron Kleebyeesun	5 November 2004 (aged 21)	74	57
Nattamon Laisuan	26 January 1998 (aged 28)	—N/a	57
Hathaithip Mijad	12 September 2007 (aged 18)	—N/a	58
Napakorn Tungkasatan	10 February 2008 (aged 17)	—N/a	58
Phattharin Aiamvareesrisakul	23 July 2009 (aged 16)	—N/a	75
Sarisa Janpeng	1 September 2010 (aged 15)	—N/a	75

India

India announced their squad on 6 December 2025.

Name	Date of Birth (Age)	Ranking of event	
Name	Date of Birth (Age)	WS	WD
P. V. Sindhu	5 July 1995 (aged 30)	30	—N/a
Unnati Hooda	20 September 2007 (aged 18)	23	—N/a
Tanvi Sharma	22 December 2008 (aged 17)	42	—N/a
Rakshitha Ramraj	4 April 2007 (aged 18)	45	—N/a
Malvika Bansod	15 September 2001 (aged 24)	50	—N/a
Treesa Jolly	27 May 2003 (aged 22)	—N/a	20
Gayatri Gopichand	4 March 2003 (aged 22)	—N/a	20
Priya Konjengbam	11 March 2001 (aged 24)	—N/a	46
Shruti Mishra	13 August 2002 (aged 23)	—N/a	46
Tanisha Crasto	5 May 2003 (aged 22)	—N/a	103

=== Group Z ===
South Korea

Name	Date of Birth (Age)	Ranking of event	
Name	Date of Birth (Age)	WS	WD
An Se-young			
Baek Ha-na			
Kim Ga-eun			
Kim Hye-jeong			
Kim Min-ji			
Kong Hee-yong			
Lee Seo-jin			
Lee So-hee			
Lee Yeon-woo			
Park Ga-eun			

Chinese Taipei

Name	Date of Birth (Age)	Ranking of event	
Name	Date of Birth (Age)	WS	WD
Chang Ching-hui			
Chiu Pin-chian			
Hsu Wen-chi			
Hsu Ya-ching			
Hsu Yin-hui			
Lin Hsiang-ti			
Lin Jhih-yun			
Sung Shuo-yun			
Sung Yu-hsuan			
Yang Ching-tun			

Singapore

Singapore's team lineup was announced by Badminton Asia on 17 January 2026.

Name	Date of Birth (Age)	Ranking of event	
Name	Date of Birth (Age)	WS	WD
Yeo Jia Min	1 February 1999 (aged 27)	28	—N/a
Insyirah Khan	12 September 2001 (aged 24)	149	372
Megan Lee	27 May 2005 (aged 20)	152	372
Jaslyn Hooi	5 August 2000 (aged 25)	189	—N/a
Jin Yujia	6 February 1997 (aged 28)	—N/a	160
Xiao En Heng	9 June 2006 (aged 19)	—N/a	160
Andrea Tay	17 June 2006 (aged 19)	—N/a	251
Zheng Yan Li	31 August 2008 (aged 17)	—N/a	712
Zheng Hong Li	14 August 2007 (aged 18)	—N/a	—N/a
Elsa Lai	24 February 2005 (aged 20)	—N/a	—N/a
