= 2025 Badminton Asia Mixed Team Championships squads =

Badminton teams

This article lists the squads lists for badminton's 2025 Badminton Asia Mixed Team Championships. Ranking used to determine the seeding for both the Group Stage & the Knock Out Stage based on the BWF World Ranking as of 14 January 2025.

== Group A ==
Group A consists of China, Chinese Taipei, and Singapore.

=== China ===
| Name | Age | Ranking of event | | | | |
| Name | Age | MS | WS | MD | WD | XD |
|---|---|---|---|---|---|---|
| Zhu Xuanchen | 18 January 2004 (aged 21) | 168 | | | | |
| Hu Zhean | 27 July 2006 (aged 18) | 186 | | | | |
| Chen Yufei | 1 March 1998 (aged 26) | | 6 | | | |
| Xu Wenjing | 11 July 2007 (aged 17) | | 433 | | | |
| Huang Di | 27 May 2001 (aged 23) | | | 76 | | |
| Liu Yang | 14 May 2003 (aged 21) | | | 76 | | |
| Chen Xujun | 4 March 2001 (aged 23) | | | 154 | | |
| Guo Ruohan | 2 April 2000 (aged 24) | | | 154 | | |
| Gao Jiaxuan | 27 March 2005 (aged 19) | | | 370 | | 129 |
| Chen Qingchen | 23 June 1997 (aged 27) | | | | 4 | |
| Keng Shuliang | 20 May 2001 (aged 23) | | | | 36 | |
| Wang Tingge | 13 March 2004 (aged 20) | | | | 89 | 704 |
| Li Huazhou | 28 January 2005 (aged 20) | | | | 105 | 263 |
| Bao Lijing | 16 January 2003 (aged 22) | | | | 128 | 90 |
| Wu Mengying | 14 March 2003 (aged 21) | | | | 197 | 305 |
| Li Hongyi | 16 June 2007 (aged 17) | | | | | 704 |

=== Chinese Taipei ===
| Name | DoB/Age | Ranking of event | | | | |
| Name | DoB/Age | MS | WS | MD | WD | XD |
|---|---|---|---|---|---|---|
| Lin Chun-yi | 2 October 1999 (aged 25) | 15 | | | | |
| Lee Chia-hao | 4 June 1999 (aged 25) | 23 | | | | |
| Sung Shuo-yun | 15 June 1997 (aged 27) | | 24 | | 18 | |
| Hsu Wen-chi | 28 September 1997 (aged 27) | | 33 | | | |
| Huang Yu-hsun | 24 October 2003 (aged 21) | | 64 | | 94 | |
| Yu Chien-hui | 8 May 1995 (aged 29) | | 164 | | 18 | |
| Lee Jhe-huei | 20 March 1994 (aged 30) | | | 8 | | |
| Yang Po-hsuan | 23 August 1996 (aged 28) | | | 8 | | 9 |
| Chiu Hsiang-chieh | 11 November 2002 (aged 22) | | | 32 | | 85 |
| Wang Chi-lin | 18 January 1995 (aged 30) | | | 32 | | 190 |
| Liu Kuang-heng | 15 August 2003 (aged 21) | | | 34 | | 99 |
| Chen Cheng-kuan | 15 October 2003 (aged 21) | | | 68 | | 28 |
| Hung En-tzu | 16 July 2001 (aged 23) | | | | 19 | 40 |
| Hsu Yin-hui | 18 March 2003 (aged 21) | | | | 25 | 28 |
| Hu Ling-fang | 6 April 1998 (aged 26) | | | | 43 | 9 |
| Teng Chun-hsun | 27 September 2000 (aged 24) | | | | 59 | 996 |

=== Singapore ===
| Name | DoB/Age | Ranking of event | | | | |
| Name | DoB/Age | MS | WS | MD | WD | XD |
|---|---|---|---|---|---|---|
| Loh Kean Yew | 26 June 1997 (aged 27) | 13 | | | | |
| Jason Teh | 25 August 2000 (aged 24) | 35 | | | | |
| Joel Koh | 23 November 2000 (aged 24) | 91 | | | | |
| Yeo Jia Min | 1 February 1999 (aged 26) | | 13 | | | |
| Megan Lee | 27 May 2005 (aged 19) | | 138 | | | |
| Insyirah Khan | 12 September 2001 (aged 23) | | 165 | | | |
| Wesley Koh | 13 July 2002 (aged 22) | | | 121 | | 146 |
| Junsuke Kubo | 11 May 2002 (aged 22) | | | 121 | | |
| Loh Kean Hean | 12 March 1995 (aged 29) | | | 189 | | |
| Howin Wong | 17 April 2001 (aged 23) | | | 189 | | |
| Heng Xiao En | 9 June 2006 (aged 18) | | | | 239 | 420 |
| Jin Yujia | 6 February 1997 (aged 28) | | | | 239 | 103 |
| Li Zheng Yan | 31 August 2008 (aged 16) | | | | 888 | |
| Terry Hee | 6 July 1995 (aged 29) | | | | | 30 |

== Group B ==
Group B consists of Indonesia, Malaysia, and Hong Kong.

=== Indonesia ===
| Name | Age | Ranking of event | | | | |
| Name | Age | MS | WS | MD | WD | XD |
|---|---|---|---|---|---|---|
| Alwi Farhan | 12 May 2005 (aged 19) | 38 | | | | |
| Yohanes Saut Marcellyno | 2 May 2003 (aged 21) | 52 | | | | |
| Putri Kusuma Wardani | 20 July 2002 (aged 22) | | 16 | | | |
| Komang Ayu Cahya Dewi | 21 October 2002 (aged 22) | | 59 | | | |
| Muhammad Shohibul Fikri | 16 November 1999 (aged 25) | | | 28 | | |
| Daniel Marthin | 31 July 2001 (aged 23) | | | 28 | | |
| Yeremia Rambitan | 15 October 1999 (aged 25) | | | 42 | | |
| Rahmat Hidayat | 17 June 2003 (aged 21) | | | 42 | | |
| Lanny Tria Mayasari | 8 May 2002 (aged 22) | | | | 27 | |
| Siti Fadia Silva Ramadhanti | 16 November 2000 (aged 24) | | | | 8 | 78 |
| Meilysa Trias Puspita Sari | 11 May 2004 (aged 20) | | | | 32 | |
| Rachel Allessya Rose | 30 June 2004 (aged 20) | | | | 32 | |
| Lisa Ayu Kusumawati | 15 January 2000 (aged 25) | | | | | 21 |
| Rinov Rivaldy | 12 November 1999 (aged 25) | | | | | 14 |
| Dejan Ferdinansyah | 21 January 2000 (aged 25) | | | | | 8 |

=== Malaysia ===
| Name | Age | Ranking of event | | | | |
| Name | Age | MS | WS | MD | WD | XD |
|---|---|---|---|---|---|---|
| Leong Jun Hao | 13 July 1999 (aged 25) | 27 | | | | |
| Justin Hoh | 1 April 2004 (aged 20) | 53 | | | | |
| Letshanaa Karupathevan | 19 August 2003 (aged 21) | | 59 | | | |
| Wong Ling Ching | 7 October 2003 (aged 21) | | 95 | | | |
| Man Wei Chong | 5 September 1999 (aged 25) | | | 13 | | |
| Tee Kai Wun | 17 April 2000 (aged 24) | | | 13 | | |
| Junaidi Arif | 6 June 2002 (aged 22) | | | 20 | | |
| Yap Roy King | 10 February 2001 (aged 24) | | | 20 | | |
| Go Pei Kee | 18 April 2002 (aged 22) | | | | 66 | |
| Teoh Mei Xing | 6 March 1997 (aged 27) | | | | 66 | |
| Cheng Su Hui | 16 June 2003 (aged 21) | | | | 122 | |
| Tan Zhing Yi | 1 August 2003 (aged 21) | | | | 122 | |
| Goh Soon Huat | 27 June 1990 (aged 34) | | | | | 4 |
| Shevon Jemie Lai | 8 August 1993 (aged 31) | | | | | 4 |
| Hoo Pang Ron | 29 March 1998 (aged 26) | | | | | 18 |
| Cheng Su Yin | 16 June 2003 (aged 21) | | | | | 18 |

=== Hong Kong ===
| Name | Age | Ranking of event | | | | |
| Name | Age | MS | WS | MD | WD | XD |
|---|---|---|---|---|---|---|
| Ng Ka Long | 24 June 1994 (aged 30) | 16 | | | | |
| Lee Cheuk Yiu | 28 August 1996 (aged 28) | 20 | | | | |
| Jason Gunawan | 18 June 2004 (aged 20) | 42 | | | | |
| Saloni Samirbhai Mehta | 27 August 2002 (aged 22) | | 101 | | | |
| Yeung Sum Yee | 18 August 1999 (aged 25) | | 189 | | | |
| Law Cheuk Him | 26 June 1994 (aged 30) | | | 117 | | |
| Yeung Shing Choi | 21 March 1996 (aged 28) | | | 117 | | 186 |
| Hung Kuei Chun | 15 September 2003 (aged 21) | | | 145 | | 123 |
| Lui Chun Wai | 10 January 2001 (aged 24) | | | 145 | | 67 |
| Yeung Nga Ting | 13 October 1998 (aged 26) | | | | 14 | |
| Yeung Pui Lam | 26 October 2001 (aged 23) | | | | 14 | |
| Lui Lok Lok | 22 September 2002 (aged 22) | | | | 48 | 186 |
| Tsang Hiu Yan | 22 February 2002 (aged 22) | | | | 48 | 123 |
| Tang Chun Man | 20 March 1995 (aged 29) | | | 1029 | | 5 |
| Ng Tsz Yau | 24 April 1998 (aged 26) | | | | | 27 |
| Fu Chi Yan | 1 April 2003 (aged 21) | | | | 476 | 67 |

== Group C ==
Group C consists of Japan, Thailand, and Kazakhstan.

=== Japan ===
| Name | Age | Ranking of event | | | | |
| Name | Age | MS | WS | MD | WD | XD |
|---|---|---|---|---|---|---|
| Kenta Nishimoto | 30 August 1994 (aged 30) | 14 | | | | |
| Yushi Tanaka | 5 October 1999 (aged 25) | 25 | | | | |
| Tomoka Miyazaki | 17 August 2006 (aged 18) | | 11 | | | |
| Kaoru Sugiyama | 6 June 2003 (aged 21) | | 39 | | | |
| Kenya Mitsuhashi | 11 July 1997 (aged 27) | | | 19 | | |
| Hiroki Okamura | 6 December 1998 (aged 26) | | | 19 | | |
| Takumi Nomura | 7 August 1997 (aged 27) | | | 61 | | |
| Yuichi Shimogami | 5 March 1998 (aged 26) | | | 61 | | |
| Rin Iwanaga | 21 May 1999 (aged 25) | | | | 5 | |
| Kie Nakanishi | 24 December 1995 (aged 29) | | | | 5 | |
| Arisa Igarashi | 1 August 1996 (aged 28) | | | | 180 | |
| Ayako Sakuramoto | 19 August 1995 (aged 29) | | | | 180 | |
| Hiroki Midorikawa | 17 May 2000 (aged 24) | | | | | 13 |
| Natsu Saito | 9 June 2000 (aged 24) | | | | | 13 |
| Hiroki Nishi | 21 March 2003 (aged 21) | | | | | 59 |
| Akari Sato | 31 March 2001 (aged 23) | | | | | 59 |

=== Thailand ===
| Name | Age | Ranking of event | | | | |
| Name | Age | MS | WS | MD | WD | XD |
|---|---|---|---|---|---|---|
| Panitchaphon Teeraratsakul | 11 November 2004 (aged 20) | 52 | | | | |
| Wongsup Wongsup-in | 11 July 2005 (aged 19) | 152 | | | | |
| Busanan Ongbamrungphan | 22 March 1996 (aged 28) | | 9 | | | |
| Pornpawee Chochuwong | 22 January 1998 (aged 27) | | 12 | | | |
| Supak Jomkoh | 4 September 1996 (aged 28) | | | 17 | | 29 |
| Peeratchai Sukphun | 31 August 2004 (aged 20) | | | 31 | | |
| Pakkapon Teeraratsakul | 11 November 2004 (aged 20) | | | 31 | | 26 |
| Chaloempon Charoenkitamorn | 15 April 1997 (aged 27) | | | 69 | | 355 |
| Worrapol Thongsa-nga | 29 October 1995 (aged 29) | | | 69 | | 73 |
| Ratchapol Makkasasithorn | 1 December 2001 (aged 23) | | | 798 | | 503 |
| Benyapa Aimsaard | 29 August 2002 (aged 22) | | | | 15 | |
| Nuntakarn Aimsaard | 23 May 1999 (aged 25) | | | | 15 | |
| Laksika Kanlaha | 17 December 1997 (aged 27) | | | | 17 | |
| Phataimas Muenwong | 5 July 1995 (aged 29) | | | | 17 | 26 |
| Nattamon Laisuan | 26 January 1998 (aged 27) | | | | 84 | 126 |
| Sapsiree Taerattanachai | 18 April 1992 (aged 32) | | | | | 7 |

=== Kazakhstan ===
| Name | Age | Ranking of event | | | | |
| Name | Age | MS | WS | MD | WD | XD |
|---|---|---|---|---|---|---|
| Dmitriy Panarin | 8 January 2000 (aged 25) | 76 | | 657 | | 414 |
| Makhsut Tajibullayev | 3 October 2004 (aged 20) | 657 | | 657 | | 779 |
| Khaitmurat Kulmatov | 19 February 1996 (aged 28) | 885 | | 745 | | 779 |
| Kamila Smagulova | 14 June 1997 (aged 27) | | 284 | | 537 | 739 |
| Aisha Zhumabek | 7 June 2000 (aged 24) | | 495 | | 386 | 414 |
| Nargiza Rakhmetullayeva | 6 December 1998 (aged 26) | | 706 | | 386 | 453 |
| Diana Namenova | 16 July 2004 (aged 20) | | 900 | | 537 | 779 |
| Artur Niyazov | 30 August 1993 (aged 31) | | | | | |

== Group D ==
Group D consists of South Korea, India, and Macau.

=== South Korea ===
| Name | Age | Ranking of event | | | | |
| Name | Age | MS | WS | MD | WD | XD |
|---|---|---|---|---|---|---|
| Cho Geon-yeop | 1 April 1996 (aged 28) | 138 | | | | |
| Park Sang-yong | 30 September 2001 (aged 23) | 501 | | | | |
| Sim Yu-jin | 13 May 1999 (aged 25) | | 26 | | | |
| Park Ga-eun | 3 January 2001 (aged 24) | | 195 | | | |
| Jin Yong | 8 April 2003 (aged 21) | | | 82 | | |
| Na Sung-seung | 28 August 1999 (aged 25) | | | 82 | | |
| Lee Jong-min | 27 August 2006 (aged 18) | | | 241 | | 308 |
| Kim Jae-hyeon | 20 December 2002 (aged 22) | | | 257 | | |
| Kim Min-ji | 31 May 1999 (aged 25) | | | | 517 | |
| Kim Yu-jung | 22 March 2003 (aged 21) | | | | 219 | 232 |
| Lee Ye-na | 17 November 1999 (aged 25) | | | | | |
| Kim Joo-eun | 10 January 1997 (aged 28) | | | | | |
| Jeong Na-eun | 27 June 2000 (aged 24) | | | | 14 | 3 |
| Ki Dong-ju | 12 April 2001 (aged 23) | | | 257 | | 242 |
| Lee Yeon-woo | 13 January 2001 (aged 24) | | | | 91 | 242 |

=== India ===
| Name | Age | Ranking of event | | | | |
| Name | Age | MS | WS | MD | WD | XD |
|---|---|---|---|---|---|---|
| Lakshya Sen | 16 August 2001 (aged 23) | 12 | | | | |
| Prannoy H. S. | 17 July 1992 (aged 32) | 26 | | | | |
| P.V. Sindhu (withdrew) | 5 July 1995 (aged 29) | | 16 | | | |
| Malvika Bansod | 15 September 2001 (aged 23) | | 27 | | | |
| Satwiksairaj Rankireddy | 13 August 2000 (aged 24) | | | 9 | | |
| Chirag Shetty | 4 July 1997 (aged 27) | | | 9 | | |
| Arjun M. R. | 11 May 1997 (aged 27) | | | 66 | | |
| Dhruv Kapila | 1 February 2000 (aged 25) | | | 66 | | 56 |
| Gayatri Gopichand | 4 March 2003 (aged 21) | | | | 9 | |
| Treesa Jolly | 27 May 2003 (aged 21) | | | | 9 | |
| Tanisha Crasto | 5 May 2003 (aged 21) | | | | 22 | 56 |
| Ashwini Ponnappa | 18 September 1989 (aged 35) | | | | 22 | |
| Sathish Karunakaran | 20 May 2001 (aged 23) | | | | | 32 |
| Aadya Variyath | 2 December 2001 (aged 23) | | | | | 32 |

=== Macau ===
| Name | Age | Ranking of event | | | | |
| Name | Age | MS | WS | MD | WD | XD |
|---|---|---|---|---|---|---|
| Pui Pang Fong | 13 March 2000 (aged 24) | 157 | | 363 | | 289 |
| Pui Chi Chon | 27 April 2003 (aged 21) | 524 | | 363 | | |
| Ao Fei Long | 2 February 2002 (aged 23) | 1523 | | | | |
| Pui Chi Wa | 1 February 2005 (aged 20) | | 259 | | 324 | 289 |
| Leong Iok Chong | 8 February 2002 (aged 23) | | | 546 | | 82 |
| Vong Kok Weng | 10 February 2002 (aged 23) | | | 546 | | |
| Ng Weng Chi | 31 March 1998 (aged 26) | | | | 324 | 82 |
| Chan Hao Wai | 2 September 2008 (aged 16) | | | | | |
| Ieong Sam Kio | 30 December 2006 (aged 18) | | | | | |
| Tong Chon In | 22 January 2006 (aged 19) | | | | | |
| Wang Wai Kei | 4 July 2006 (aged 18) | | | | | |
