= 2026 Badminton Asia Team Championships – Men's team event =

Men's team at the 2026 Badminton Asia Team Championships
- Venue: Conson Gymnasium
- Location: Qingdao, China
- Dates: 3–8 February 2026
- Nations: 12

Medalists
gold medal	Japan
silver medal	China
bronze medal	South Korea
bronze medal	Indonesia

The men's team event at the 2026 Badminton Asia Team Championships took placed from 3 to 8 February at the Conson Gymnasium, Qingdao, China. China were the champion of the last edition.

== Seeds ==
The seeds were announced on 6 January 2026 based on the BWF World Team Rankings.

1. China (final)
2. Indonesia (semi-finals)
3. Chinese Taipei (quarter-finals)
4. Japan (champions)

== Groups ==
The draw was held on 9 January 2026. The men's team group stages consist of 4 groups: A, B, C, and D.

Group A	Group B	Group C	Group D
China (1, H); Thailand; Macau	Chinese Taipei (3); South Korea; Hong Kong	Japan (4); India; Singapore	Indonesia (2); Malaysia; Myanmar

== Group stage ==
All times are China Standard Time (UTC+08:00).

=== Group A ===
Pos	Team	Pld	W	L	MF	MA	MD	GF	GA	GD	PF	PA	PD	Pts	Qualification	(China)	(Thailand)	(Macau)
1	China (H)	2	2	0	8	2	+6	18	5	+13	460	321	+139	2	Qualified for Quarter-finals	—	3–2	5–0
2	Thailand	2	1	1	7	3	+4	15	8	+7	423	357	+66	1	Qualified for Quarter-finals	2–3	—	5–0
3	Macau	2	0	2	0	10	−10	0	20	−20	215	420	−205	0		0–5	0–5	—

Source: Badminton World Federation
Rules for classification: Tournament criteria
(H) Host

==== China vs Macau ====
China
5
Conson Gymnasium, Court 1
3 February 2026, 17:00

Macau
0

			1	2	3
1	(China) (Macau)	Wang Zhengxing; Pui Pang Fong	21; 16	21; 15
2	(China) (Macau)	Hu Keyuan / Lin Xiangyi; Ng Ka Seng / Tong Chon In	21; 16	21; 8
3	(China) (Macau)	Hu Zhe'an; Pui Chi Chon	21; 3	21; 7
4	(China) (Macau)	Chen Junting / Liu Junrong; Leong Iok Chong / Vong Kok Weng	21; 10	21; 10
5	(China) (Macau)	Zhu Xuanchen; Ao Fei Long	21; 10	21; 13

==== Thailand vs Macau ====
Thailand
5
Conson Gymnasium, Court 2
4 February 2026, 17:00

Macau
0

			1	2	3
1	(Thailand) (Macau)	Kantaphon Wangcharoen; Pui Pang Fong	21; 15	21; 15
2	(Thailand) (Macau)	Pharanyu Kaosamaang / Tanadon Punpanich; Ng Ka Seng / Pui Chi Chon	21; 9	21; 9
3	(Thailand) (Macau)	Puritat Arree; Ao Fei Long	21; 12	21; 12
4	(Thailand) (Macau)	Peeratchai Sukphun / Pakkapon Teeraratsakul; Leong Iok Chong / Vong Kok Weng	21; 7	21; 9
5	(Thailand) (Macau)	Tanawat Yimjit; Tong Chon In	21; 13	21; 6

==== China vs Thailand ====
China
3
Conson Gymnasium, Court 1
5 February 2026, 17:00

Thailand
2

			1	2	3
1	(China) (Thailand)	Wang Zhengxing; Panitchaphon Teeraratsakul	21; 19	19; 21	18; 21
2	(China) (Thailand)	Hu Keyuan / Lin Xiangyi; Chaloempon Charoenkitamorn / Worrapol Thongsa-nga	21; 19	18; 21	21; 13
3	(China) (Thailand)	Hu Zhe'an; Kantaphon Wangcharoen	21; 9	21; 13
4	(China) (Thailand)	He Jiting / Ren Xiangyu; Peeratchai Sukphun / Pakkapon Teeraratsakul	18; 21	22; 20	8; 21
5	(China) (Thailand)	Dong Tianyao; Tanawat Yimjit	21; 4	21; 11

=== Group B ===
Pos	Team	Pld	W	L	MF	MA	MD	GF	GA	GD	PF	PA	PD	Pts	Qualification	South Korea	Chinese Taipei for Olympic games	Hong Kong
1	South Korea	2	2	0	6	4	+2	14	11	+3	475	429	+46	2	Qualified for Quarter-finals	—	3–2	3–2
2	Chinese Taipei	2	1	1	5	5	0	13	10	+3	420	430	−10	1	Qualified for Quarter-finals	2–3	—	3–2
3	Hong Kong	2	0	2	4	6	−2	8	14	−6	380	416	−36	0		2–3	2–3	—

Source: Badminton World Federation
Rules for classification: Tournament criteria

==== Chinese Taipei vs Hong Kong ====
Chinese Taipei
3
Conson Gymnasium, Court 2
3 February 2026, 17:00

Hong Kong
2

			1	2	3
1	(Chinese Taipei) (Hong Kong)	Lin Chun-yi; Lee Cheuk Yiu	17; 21	15; 21
2	(Chinese Taipei) (Hong Kong)	Chiu Hsiang-chieh / Wang Chi-lin; Hung Kuei Chun / Lui Chun Wai	21; 19	22; 20
3	(Chinese Taipei) (Hong Kong)	Lee Chia-hao; Jason Gunawan	16; 21	13; 21
4	(Chinese Taipei) (Hong Kong)	Lee Fang-chih / Lee Fang-jen; Lee Chun Hei / Yeung Shing Choi	21; 10	21; 13
5	(Chinese Taipei) (Hong Kong)	Chi Yu-jen; Lam Ka To	21; 18	21; 19

==== South Korea vs Hong Kong ====
South Korea
3
Conson Gymnasium, Court 3
4 February 2026, 17:00

Hong Kong
2

			1	2	3
1	(South Korea) (Hong Kong)	Yoo Tae-bin; Lee Cheuk Yiu	19; 21	21; 18	10; 21
2	(South Korea) (Hong Kong)	Jin Yong / Kim Won-ho; Hung Kuei Chun / Lui Chun Wai	21; 9	21; 10
3	(South Korea) (Hong Kong)	Choi Ji-hoon; Ng Ka Long	21; 19	22; 20
4	(South Korea) (Hong Kong)	Kang Min-hyuk / Ki Dong-ju; Law Cheuk Him / Lee Chun Hei	21; 10	21; 11
5	(South Korea) (Hong Kong)	Park Sang-yong; Jason Gunawan	19; 21	21; 16	11; 21

==== Chinese Taipei vs South Korea ====
Chinese Taipei
2
Conson Gymnasium, Court 4
5 February 2026, 17:00

South Korea
3

			1	2	3
1	(Chinese Taipei) (South Korea)	Lin Chun-yi; Yoo Tae-bin	21; 18	11; 21	15; 21
2	(Chinese Taipei) (South Korea)	Lee Jhe-huei / Yang Po-hsuan; Cho Song-hyun / Kim Won-ho	22; 20	9; 21	16; 21
3	(Chinese Taipei) (South Korea)	Wang Tzu-wei; Park Sang-yong	21; 19	21; 17
4	(Chinese Taipei) (South Korea)	Chiu Hsiang-chieh / Wang Chi-lin; Kang Min-hyuk / Ki Dong-ju	17; 21	21; 17	16; 21
5	(Chinese Taipei) (South Korea)	Chi Yu-jen; Cho Hyeon-woo	21; 17	21; 13

=== Group C ===
Pos	Team	Pld	W	L	MF	MA	MD	GF	GA	GD	PF	PA	PD	Pts	Qualification	Japan	India	Singapore
1	Japan	2	2	0	7	3	+4	16	9	+7	473	421	+52	2	Qualified for Quarter-finals	—	3–2	4–1
2	India	2	1	1	5	5	0	13	12	+1	453	434	+19	1	Qualified for Quarter-finals	2–3	—	3–2
3	Singapore	2	0	2	3	7	−4	8	16	−8	404	475	−71	0		1–4	2–3	—

Source: Badminton World Federation
Rules for classification: Tournament criteria

==== Japan vs Singapore ====
Japan
4
Conson Gymnasium, Court 3
3 February 2026, 17:00

Singapore
1

			1	2	3
1	(Japan) (Singapore)	Kenta Nishimoto; Loh Kean Yew	17; 21	17; 21
2	(Japan) (Singapore)	Takuro Hoki / Yugo Kobayashi; Wesley Koh / Donovan Wee	22; 20	21; 19
3	(Japan) (Singapore)	Koki Watanabe; Jason Teh	21; 15	21; 16
4	(Japan) (Singapore)	Takumi Nomura / Yuichi Shimogami; Terry Hee / Howin Wong	22; 20	17; 21	21; 12
5	(Japan) (Singapore)	Yudai Okimoto; Joel Koh	13; 21	21; 11	21; 12

==== India vs Singapore ====
India
3
Conson Gymnasium, Court 1
4 February 2026, 17:00

Singapore
2

			1	2	3
1	(India) (Singapore)	Lakshya Sen; Loh Kean Yew	16; 21	21; 19	16; 21
2	(India) (Singapore)	Satwiksairaj Rankireddy / Chirag Shetty; Wesley Koh / Junsuke Kubo	21; 10	21; 8
3	(India) (Singapore)	Ayush Shetty; Jason Teh	21; 17	21; 15
4	(India) (Singapore)	Pruthvi Krishnamurthy Roy / Sai Pratheek K. Nge Joo Jie / Donovan Wee	21; 8	21; 23	20; 22
5	(India) (Singapore)	Srikanth Kidambi; Joel Koh	21; 15	21; 16

==== Japan vs India ====
Japan
3
Conson Gymnasium, Court 2
5 February 2026, 17:00

India
2

			1	2	3
1	(Japan) (India)	Kenta Nishimoto; Ayush Shetty	18; 21	21; 15	11; 21
2	(Japan) (India)	Takuro Hoki / Yugo Kobayashi; Satwiksairaj Rankireddy / Chirag Shetty	18; 21	21; 15	12; 21
3	(Japan) (India)	Yushi Tanaka; Prannoy H. S.	21; 17	21; 11
4	(Japan) (India)	Kakeru Kumagai / Hiroki Nishi; Hariharan Amsakarunan / Pruthvi Krishnamurthy Roy	21; 14	21; 10
5	(Japan) (India)	Koki Watanabe; Tharun Mannepalli	12; 21	21; 14	21; 11

=== Group D ===
Pos	Team	Pld	W	L	MF	MA	MD	GF	GA	GD	PF	PA	PD	Pts	Qualification	Indonesia	Malaysia	Myanmar
1	Indonesia	2	2	0	8	2	+6	17	7	+10	461	351	+110	2	Qualified for Quarter-finals	—	3–2	5–0
2	Malaysia	2	1	1	7	3	+4	17	7	+10	459	370	+89	1	Qualified for Quarter-finals	2–3	—	5–0
3	Myanmar	2	0	2	0	10	−10	0	20	−20	221	420	−199	0		0–5	0–5	—

Source: Badminton World Federation
Rules for classification: Tournament criteria

==== Indonesia vs Myanmar ====
Indonesia
5
Conson Gymnasium, Court 4
3 February 2026, 17:00

Myanmar
0

			1	2	3
1	(Indonesia) (Myanmar)	Prahdiska Bagas Shujiwo; Hein Htut	21; 14	21; 19
2	(Indonesia) (Myanmar)	Anthony Sinisuka Ginting; Nyan Shaine Lin	21; 5	21; 11
3	(Indonesia) (Myanmar)	Richie Duta Richardo; Lal Zuidika	21; 5	21; 2
4	(Indonesia) (Myanmar)	Muhammad Rian Ardianto / Rahmat Hidayat; Hein Htut / Phone Htet Zaw	21; 13	21; 12
5	(Indonesia) (Myanmar)	Leo Rolly Carnando / Bagas Maulana; Phyo Thurain Kyaw / Lal Zuidika	21; 4	21; 17

==== Malaysia vs Myanmar ====
Malaysia
5
Conson Gymnasium, Court 4
4 February 2026, 17:00

Myanmar
0

			1	2	3
1	(Malaysia) (Myanmar)	Justin Hoh; Hein Htut	21; 18	21; 19
2	(Malaysia) (Myanmar)	Eogene Ewe; Nyan Shaine Lin	21; 10	21; 14
3	(Malaysia) (Myanmar)	Kong Wei Xiang; Lal Zuidika	21; 11	21; 11
4	(Malaysia) (Myanmar)	Aaron Tai / Yap Roy King; Nyan Shaine Lin / Phone Htet Zaw	21; 11	21; 9
5	(Malaysia) (Myanmar)	Choong Hon Jian / Muhammad Haikal; Phyo Thurain Kyaw / Lal Zuidika	21; 9	21; 7

==== Indonesia vs Malaysia ====
Indonesia
3
Conson Gymnasium, Court 3
5 February 2026, 17:00

Malaysia
2

			1	2	3
1	(Indonesia) (Malaysia)	Zaki Ubaidillah; Justin Hoh	16; 21	19; 21
2	(Indonesia) (Malaysia)	Leo Rolly Carnando / Bagas Maulana; Junaidi Arif / Yap Roy King	13; 21	21; 12	13; 21
3	(Indonesia) (Malaysia)	Prahdiska Bagas Shujiwo; Eogene Ewe	21; 12	14; 21	21; 15
4	(Indonesia) (Malaysia)	Raymond Indra / Nikolaus Joaquin; Choong Hon Jian / Muhammad Haikal	16; 21	21; 11	21; 19
5	(Indonesia) (Malaysia)	Anthony Sinisuka Ginting; Kong Wei Xiang	21; 17	13; 21	21; 16

== Knockouts ==
All times are China Standard Time (UTC+08:00).

=== Bracket ===
Quarter-finals
6 February, 17:00
China (1)	3
Chinese Taipei (3)	1
6 February, 17:00
South Korea	3
India	1
6 February, 17:00
Malaysia	0
Japan (4)	3
6 February, 17:00
Thailand	2
Indonesia (2)	3

Semi-finals
7 February, 17:00
China (1)	3
South Korea	2
7 February, 17:00
Japan (4)	3
Indonesia (2)	1

Final
8 February, 18:00
China (1)	0
Japan (4)	3

=== Quarter-finals ===
==== China vs Chinese Taipei ====
China
3
Conson Gymnasium, Court 2
6 February 2026, 17:00

Chinese Taipei
1

			1	2	3
1	(China) (Chinese Taipei)	Wang Zhengxing; Lin Chun-yi	21; 11	21; 10
2	(China) (Chinese Taipei)	Hu Keyuan / Lin Xiangyi; Lee Jhe-huei / Yang Po-hsuan	24; 26	21; 19	21; 18
3	(China) (Chinese Taipei)	Hu Zhe'an; Wang Tzu-wei	16; 21	18; 21
4	(China) (Chinese Taipei)	He Jiting / Ren Xiangyu; Chiu Hsiang-chieh / Wang Chi-lin	21; 11	22; 20
5	(China) (Chinese Taipei)	Dong Tianyao; Chi Yu-jen				not played

==== South Korea vs India ====
South Korea
3
Conson Gymnasium, Court 3
6 February 2026, 17:00

India
1

			1	2	3
1	(South Korea) (India)	Yoo Tae-bin; Ayush Shetty	18; 21	21; 14	26; 24
2	(South Korea) (India)	Cho Song-hyun / Kim Won-ho; Hariharan Amsakarunan / Chirag Shetty	21; 11	21; 13
3	(South Korea) (India)	Choi Ji-hoon; Srikanth Kidambi	15; 21	16; 21
4	(South Korea) (India)	Jin Yong / Ki Dong-ju; Pruthvi Krishnamurthy Roy / Sai Pratheek K.	21; 11	21; 16
5	(South Korea) (India)	Cho Hyeon-woo; Tharun Mannepalli				not played

==== Malaysia vs Japan ====
Malaysia
0
Conson Gymnasium, Court 1
6 February 2026, 17:00

Japan
3

			1	2	3
1	(Malaysia) (Japan)	Justin Hoh; Yushi Tanaka	17; 21	22; 20	11; 21
2	(Malaysia) (Japan)	Junaidi Arif / Yap Roy King; Takuro Hoki / Yugo Kobayashi	14; 21	12; 21
3	(Malaysia) (Japan)	Aidil Sholeh; Koki Watanabe	22; 20	11; 21	3; 21
4	(Malaysia) (Japan)	Choong Hon Jian / Muhammad Haikal; Kakeru Kumagai / Hiroki Nishi				not played
5	(Malaysia) (Japan)	Eogene Ewe; Yudai Okimoto				not played

==== Thailand vs Indonesia ====
Thailand
2
Conson Gymnasium, Court 4
6 February 2026, 17:00

Indonesia
3

			1	2	3
1	(Thailand) (Indonesia)	Panitchaphon Teeraratsakul; Zaki Ubaidillah	13; 21	20; 22
2	(Thailand) (Indonesia)	Peeratchai Sukphun / Pakkapon Teeraratsakul; Leo Rolly Carnando / Bagas Maulana	14; 21	21; 15	21; 17
3	(Thailand) (Indonesia)	Puritat Arree; Prahdiska Bagas Shujiwo	7; 21	21; 17	18; 21
4	(Thailand) (Indonesia)	Pharanyu Kaosamaang / Worrapol Thongsa-nga; Raymond Indra / Nikolaus Joaquin	21; 19	21; 18
5	(Thailand) (Indonesia)	Tanawat Yimjit; Richie Duta Richardo	5; 21	17; 21

=== Semi-finals ===
==== China vs South Korea ====
China
3
Conson Gymnasium, Court 1
7 February 2026, 17:00

South Korea
2

			1	2	3
1	(China) (South Korea)	Wang Zhengxing; Yoo Tae-bin	19; 21	21; 16	13; 21
2	(China) (South Korea)	He Jiting / Ren Xiangyu; Jin Yong / Kim Won-ho	15; 21	17; 21
3	(China) (South Korea)	Hu Zhe'an; Choi Ji-hoon	21; 13	21; 19
4	(China) (South Korea)	Chen Junting / Liu Junrong; Cho Song-hyun / Ki Dong-ju	21; 15	21; 14
5	(China) (South Korea)	Dong Tianyao; Cho Hyeon-woo	21; 6	21; 19

==== Japan vs Indonesia ====
Japan
3
Conson Gymnasium, Court 2
7 February 2026, 17:00

Indonesia
1

			1	2	3
1	(Japan) (Indonesia)	Kenta Nishimoto; Zaki Ubaidillah	20; 22	16; 21
2	(Japan) (Indonesia)	Kakeru Kumagai / Hiroki Nishi; Muhammad Rian Ardianto / Leo Rolly Carnando	21; 16	21; 17
3	(Japan) (Indonesia)	Yushi Tanaka; Prahdiska Bagas Shujiwo	21; 11	21; 15
4	(Japan) (Indonesia)	Takumi Nomura / Yuichi Shimogami; Raymond Indra / Nikolaus Joaquin	21; 17	21; 15
5	(Japan) (Indonesia)	Yudai Okimoto; Richie Duta Richardo				not played

=== Final ===
==== China vs Japan ====
China
0
Conson Gymnasium, Court 1
8 February 2026, 18:00

Japan
3

			1	2	3
1	(China) (Japan)	Hu Zhe'an; Yushi Tanaka	10; 21	18; 21
2	(China) (Japan)	He Jiting / Ren Xiangyu; Kakeru Kumagai / Hiroki Nishi	17; 21	21; 14	15; 21
3	(China) (Japan)	Zhu Xuanchen; Koki Watanabe	24; 22	17; 21	18; 21
4	(China) (Japan)	Chen Junting / Liu Junrong; Takumi Nomura / Yuichi Shimogami				not played
5	(China) (Japan)	Dong Tianyao; Yudai Okimoto				not played

== Final rankings ==
Pos	Team	Pld	W	L	Pts	MD	GD	PD	Final result
1st place, gold medalist(s)	Japan	5	5	0	5	+12	+19	+156	Champions
2nd place, silver medalist(s)	China	5	4	1	4	+6	+15	+170	Runners-up
3rd place, bronze medalist(s)	Indonesia	4	3	1	3	+5	+8	+117	Eliminated in semi-finals
3rd place, bronze medalist(s)	South Korea	4	3	1	3	+3	+3	+49	Eliminated in semi-finals
5	Thailand	3	1	2	1	+3	+5	+31	Eliminated in quarter-finals
6	Malaysia	3	1	2	1	+1	+6	+35	Eliminated in quarter-finals
7	Chinese Taipei	3	1	2	1	−2	0	−38	Eliminated in quarter-finals
8	India	3	1	2	1	−2	−2	−9	Eliminated in quarter-finals
9	Hong Kong	2	0	2	0	−2	−6	−36	Eliminated in group stage
10	Singapore	2	0	2	0	−4	−8	−71	Eliminated in group stage
11	Myanmar	2	0	2	0	−10	−20	−199	Eliminated in group stage
12	Macau	2	0	2	0	−10	−20	−205	Eliminated in group stage
