= 2025 Taipei Open =

Tournament details
- Dates: 6–11 May
- Edition: 42nd
- Level: Super 300
- Total prize money: US$240,000
- Venue: Taipei Arena
- Location: Taipei, Taiwan

Champions
- Men's singles: (Singapore) Loh Kean Yew
- Women's singles: (Japan) Tomoka Miyazaki
- Men's doubles: (Chinese Taipei) Chiu Hsiang-chieh (Chinese Taipei) Wang Chi-lin
- Women's doubles: (Chinese Taipei) Hsieh Pei-shan (Chinese Taipei) Hung En-tzu
- Mixed doubles: (Indonesia) Jafar Hidayatullah (Indonesia) Felisha Pasaribu

The 2025 Taipei Open (officially known as the Yonex Taipei Open 2025) was a badminton tournament that took place at Taipei Arena in Taipei, Taiwan, from 6 to 11 May 2025 and had a total prize of $240,000.

== Tournament ==
The 2025 Taipei Open was the tenth tournament of the 2025 BWF World Tour and also part of the Taipei Open championships, which have been held since 1980. This tournament was organized by the Chinese Taipei Badminton Association with sanction from the BWF.

=== Venue ===
This international tournament was held at Taipei Arena, in Taipei, Taiwan.

=== Point distribution ===
Below is the point distribution table for each phase of the tournament based on the BWF points system for the BWF World Tour Super 300 event.

Winner	Runner-up	3/4	5/8	9/16	17/32	33/64	65/128
7,000	5,950	4,900	3,850	2,750	1,670	660	320

=== Prize pool ===
The total prize money was US$240,000 with the distribution of the prize money in accordance with BWF regulations.

Event	Winner	Finalist	Semi-finals	Quarter-finals	Last 16
Singles	$18,000	$9,120	$3,480	$1,440	$840
Doubles	$18,960	$9,120	$3,360	$1,740	$900

== Men's singles ==
=== Seeds ===
1. (Chinese Taipei) Chou Tien-chen (final)
2. (Singapore) Loh Kean Yew (champion)
3. (Chinese Taipei) Lee Chia-hao (first round)
4. (Chinese Taipei) Lin Chun-yi (second round)
5. (Chinese Taipei) Wang Tzu-wei (semi-finals)
6. (Chinese Taipei) Chi Yu-jen (first round)
7. (Canada) Brian Yang (quarter-finals)
8. (Indonesia) Alwi Farhan (withdrew)

=== Finals ===
Semi-finals
1	(Chinese Taipei) Chou Tien-chen	21	21
(India) Ayush Shetty	18	17
5	(Chinese Taipei) Wang Tzu-wei	18	9
2	(Singapore) Loh Kean Yew	21	21

Final
1	(Chinese Taipei) Chou Tien-chen	14	21	20
2	(Singapore) Loh Kean Yew	21	15	22

=== Top half ===
==== Section 1 ====
First round
1	(Chinese Taipei) Chou T-c	21	9	21
(Japan) T Obayashi	12	21	15
(Malaysia) Aidil S	21	11	21
Q2	(Malaysia) Tan J J	13	21	8
6	(Chinese Taipei) Chi Y-j	21	17	11
Q4	(Indonesia) Z Ubaidillah	9	21	21
(India) T Mannepalli	21	19	21
(Japan) S Ogawa	17	21	12

Second round
1	(Chinese Taipei) Chou T-c	21	21
(Malaysia) Aidil S	14	16
Q4	(Indonesia) Z Ubaidillah	21	21
(India) T Mannepalli	13	9

Quarter-finals
1	(Chinese Taipei) Chou T-c	16	21	21
Q4	(Indonesia) Z Ubaidillah	21	18	19

==== Section 2 ====
First round
3	(Chinese Taipei) Lee C-h	17	18
(India) A Shetty	21	21
(India) S Kidambi	21	21
(India) S Subramanian	16	15
7	(Canada) B Yang	23	21
(India) M Maisnam	21	12
(Malaysia) Ng T Y	21	18	17
Q1	(Chinese Taipei) Wang P-w	18	21	21

Second round
(India) A Shetty	21	15	21
(India) S Kidambi	16	21	17
7	(Canada) B Yang	25	16	21
Q1	(Chinese Taipei) Wang P-w	23	21	16

Quarter-finals
(India) A Shetty	16	21	21
7	(Canada) B Yang	21	19	14

=== Bottom half ===
==== Section 3 ====
First round
(South Korea) Jeon H-j	21	21
(Thailand) K Wangcharoen	14	15
(Malaysia) Cheam J W	14	11
5	(Chinese Taipei) Wang T-w	21	21
(Malaysia) J Hoh	21	21
(Chinese Taipei) Su L-y	16	13
(Belgium) J Carraggi	11	9
4	(Chinese Taipei) Lin C-y	21	21

Second round
(South Korea) Jeon H-j	11	18
5	(Chinese Taipei) Wang T-w	21	21
(Malaysia) J Hoh	21	21
4	(Chinese Taipei) Lin C-y	17	18

Quarter-finals
5	(Chinese Taipei) Wang T-w	21	21
(Malaysia) J Hoh	13	15

==== Section 4 ====
First round
(Thailand) P Teeraratsakul	15	23	21
(Japan) K Takahashi	21	21	13
(Japan) R Hatano	16	15
SWM	(Hong Kong) J Gunawan	21	21
(Finland) J Oldorff	21	21
PFQ	(Chinese Taipei) Huang P-h	13	13
Q3	(Hong Kong) Chan Y C	13	21	12
2	(Singapore) Loh K Y	21	15	21

Second round
(Thailand) P Teeraratsakul	21	6	21
(Hong Kong) J Gunawan	16	21	11
(Finland) J Oldorff	17	12
2	(Singapore) Loh K Y	21	21

Quarter-finals
(Thailand) P Teeraratsakul	18	12
2	(Singapore) Loh K Y	21	21

== Women's singles ==
=== Seeds ===
1. (Japan) Tomoka Miyazaki (champion)
2. (South Korea) Sim Yu-jin (semi-finals)
3. (Chinese Taipei) Sung Shuo-yun (second round)
4. (Chinese Taipei) Hsu Wen-chi (first round)
5. (Chinese Taipei) Chiu Pin-chian (second round)
6. (Chinese Taipei) Lin Hsiang-ti (quarter-finals)
7. (Japan) Kaoru Sugiyama (first round)
8. (Japan) Riko Gunji (quarter-finals)

=== Finals ===
Semi-finals
1	(Japan) Tomoka Miyazaki	21	21
(India) Unnati Hooda	19	11
Q4	(Thailand) Pitchamon Opatniputh	12	21	21
2	(South Korea) Sim Yu-jin	21	15	13

Final
1	(Japan) Tomoka Miyazaki	21	20	21
Q4	(Thailand) Pitchamon Opatniputh	12	22	14

=== Top half ===
==== Section 1 ====
First round
1	(Japan) T Miyazaki	21	21
(Chinese Taipei) Huang C-p	16	10
(Canada) WY Zhang	16	17
Q1	(Chinese Taipei) Chen S-y	21	21
6	(Chinese Taipei) Lin H-t	26	18	21
(Thailand) P Choeikeewong	24	21	14
(Japan) H Akechi	18	22
(Japan) N Okuhara	21	24

Second round
1	(Japan) T Miyazaki	21	21
Q1	(Chinese Taipei) Chen S-y	15	10
6	(Chinese Taipei) Lin H-t	21	14	21
(Japan) N Okuhara	11	21	16

Quarter-finals
1	(Japan) T Miyazaki	17	21	21
6	(Chinese Taipei) Lin H-t	21	8	17

==== Section 2 ====
First round
3	(Chinese Taipei) Sung S-y	21	12	21
PFQ	(Myanmar) Thet Htar T	17	21	14
(Chinese Taipei) Hung Y-t	21	21
(India) A Kashyap	9	12
7	(Japan) K Sugiyama	20	17
Q3	(Chinese Taipei) Lin S-y	22	21
(India) U Hooda	21	21
(India) A Upadhyaya	13	17

Second round
3	(Chinese Taipei) Sung S-y	17	21	16
(Chinese Taipei) Hung Y-t	21	12	21
Q3	(Chinese Taipei) Lin S-y	12	7
(India) U Hooda	21	21

Quarter-finals
(Chinese Taipei) Hung Y-t	8	21	19
(India) U Hooda	21	19	21

=== Bottom half ===
==== Section 3 ====
First round
(Japan) A Takahashi	10	26	21
(Chinese Taipei) Huang Y-h	21	24	14
(Chinese Taipei) Tung C-t	17	13
8	(Japan) R Gunji	21	21
(Indonesia) E N T Wardoyo	11	11
Q4	(Thailand) P Opatniputh	21	21
(Turkey) N Arın	21	21
4	(Chinese Taipei) Hsu W-c	17	17

Second round
(Japan) A Takahashi	12	14
8	(Japan) R Gunji	21	21
Q4	(Thailand) P Opatniputh	19	21	21
(Turkey) N Arın	21	15	9

Quarter-finals
8	(Japan) R Gunji	16	17
Q4	(Thailand) P Opatniputh	21	21

==== Section 4 ====
First round
(Indonesia) K A C Dewi	19	13
(Malaysia) Letshanaa K	21	21
(Chinese Taipei) Liang T-y	19	15
5	(Chinese Taipei) Chiu P-c	21	21
(India) A Kharb	17	12
Q2	(Thailand) T Nithiittikrai	21	21
(India) R Ramraj	7	15
2	(South Korea) Sim Y-j	21	21

Second round
(Malaysia) Letshanaa K	21	17	26
5	(Chinese Taipei) Chiu P-c	19	21	24
Q2	(Thailand) T Nithiittikrai	10	9
2	(South Korea) Sim Y-j	21	21

Quarter-finals
(Malaysia) Letshanaa K	16	21	15
2	(South Korea) Sim Y-j	21	13	21

== Men's doubles ==
=== Seeds ===
1. (Chinese Taipei) Lee Jhe-huei / Yang Po-hsuan (withdrew)
2. (Chinese Taipei) Chiu Hsiang-chieh / Wang Chi-lin (champions)
3. (Chinese Taipei) Liu Kuang-heng / Yang Po-han (first round)
4. (Chinese Taipei) Lee Fang-chih / Lee Fang-jen (first round)
5. (South Korea) Jin Yong / Na Sung-seung (second round)
6. (Malaysia) Choong Hon Jian / Muhammad Haikal (first round)
7. (Japan) Hiroki Midorikawa / Kyohei Yamashita (semi-finals)
8. (Chinese Taipei) Lu Ming-che / Tang Kai-wei (second round)

=== Finals ===
Semi-finals
7	(Japan) Hiroki Midorikawa (Japan) Kyohei Yamashita	19	13
(South Korea) Kang Min-hyuk (South Korea) Ki Dong-ju	21	21
(Japan) Takumi Nomura (Japan) Yuichi Shimogami	11	12
2	(Chinese Taipei) Chiu Hsiang-chieh (Chinese Taipei) Wang Chi-lin	21	21

Final
(South Korea) Kang Min-hyuk (South Korea) Ki Dong-ju	18	15
2	(Chinese Taipei) Chiu Hsiang-chieh (Chinese Taipei) Wang Chi-lin	21	21

=== Top half ===
==== Section 1 ====
First round
3	(Chinese Taipei) Liu K-h (Chinese Taipei) Yang P-ha	21	18	6^{r}
(Chinese Taipei) He Z-w (Chinese Taipei) Huang J-h	14	21	14
(Japan) K Matsui (Japan) K Tamate	21	21
(Chinese Taipei) Lin C-y (Chinese Taipei) Lin Y-s	10	11
7	(Japan) H Midorikawa (Japan) K Yamashita	21	21
(Japan) T Aizawa (Japan) D Sano	12	19
(Malaysia) Low H Y (Malaysia) Ng E C	21	21	19
Q2	(Chinese Taipei) Su C-h (Chinese Taipei) Wu G-x	23	14	21

Second round
(Chinese Taipei) He Z-w (Chinese Taipei) Huang J-h	21	18	18
(Japan) K Matsui (Japan) K Tamate	17	21	21
7	(Japan) H Midorikawa (Japan) K Yamashita	21	21
Q2	(Chinese Taipei) Su C-h (Chinese Taipei) Wu G-x	15	16

Quarter-finals
(Japan) K Matsui (Japan) K Tamate	14	15
7	(Japan) H Midorikawa (Japan) K Yamashita	21	21

==== Section 2 ====
First round
5	(South Korea) Jin Y (South Korea) Na S-s	21	21
(Canada) J Lai (Canada) N Yakura	7	13
PFQ	(Chinese Taipei) Chan Y-l (Chinese Taipei) Chu B-r	10	16
(South Korea) Kang M-h (South Korea) Ki D-j	21	21
SWM	(Chinese Taipei) Chen Z-r (Chinese Taipei) Lin Y-c	17	21	12
(Japan) K Shibata (Japan) N Yamada	21	17	21
(Vietnam) Nguyễn Đ H (Vietnam) Trần Đ M	14	12
(Chinese Taipei) Chang K-c (Chinese Taipei) Po L-w	21	21

Second round
5	(South Korea) Jin Y (South Korea) Na S-s	17	21
(South Korea) Kang M-h (South Korea) Ki D-j	21	23
(Japan) K Shibata (Japan) N Yamada	21	9	17
(Chinese Taipei) Chang K-c (Chinese Taipei) Po L-w	13	21	21

Quarter-finals
(South Korea) Kang M-h (South Korea) Ki D-j	21	17	21
(Chinese Taipei) Chang K-c (Chinese Taipei) Po L-w	9	21	14

=== Bottom half ===
==== Section 3 ====
First round
(Indonesia) R Hidayat (Indonesia) Y Rambitan	23	21	21
(Malaysia) Chia W J (Malaysia) Lwi S H	21	23	14
(Singapore) W Koh (Singapore) J Kubo	13	21	21
6	(Malaysia) Choong H J (Malaysia) M Haikal	21	16	12
(Japan) T Nomura (Japan) Y Shimogami	25	21
Q1	(Malaysia) Goh B Z (Malaysia) Loo B K	23	12
Q3	(Malaysia) Chen T J (Malaysia) Wong V S	22	21
4	(Chinese Taipei) Lee F-c (Chinese Taipei) Lee F-j	20	17

Second round
(Indonesia) R Hidayat (Indonesia) Y Rambitan	21	21
(Singapore) W Koh (Singapore) J Kubo	15	16
(Japan) T Nomura (Japan) Y Shimogami	21	21
Q3	(Malaysia) Chen T J (Malaysia) Wong V S	19	18

Quarter-finals
(Indonesia) R Hidayat (Indonesia) Y Rambitan	18	13
(Japan) T Nomura (Japan) Y Shimogami	21	21

==== Section 4 ====
First round
(Chinese Taipei) Lu C-y (Chinese Taipei) Wei C-w	21	22
Q4	(Chinese Taipei) Lai P-y (Chinese Taipei) Tsai F-c	17	20
(Japan) K Kumagai (Japan) H Nishi	20	19
8	(Chinese Taipei) Lu M-c (Chinese Taipei) Tang K-w	22	21
(Malaysia) Kang K X (Malaysia) A Tai	9	21	15
(Chinese Taipei) Chen C-k (United States) Chen Z Y	21	15	21
(Chinese Taipei) Chiang C-w (Chinese Taipei) Wu H-y	17	19
2	(Chinese Taipei) Chiu H-c (Chinese Taipei) Wang C-l	21	21

Second round
(Chinese Taipei) Lu C-y (Chinese Taipei) Wei C-w	21	21
8	(Chinese Taipei) Lu M-c (Chinese Taipei) Tang K-w	6	19
(Chinese Taipei) Chen C-k (United States) Chen Z Y	19	7
2	(Chinese Taipei) Chiu H-c (Chinese Taipei) Wang C-l	21	21

Quarter-finals
(Chinese Taipei) Lu C-y (Chinese Taipei) Wei C-w	14	13
2	(Chinese Taipei) Chiu H-c (Chinese Taipei) Wang C-l	21	21

== Women's doubles ==
=== Seeds ===
1. (Chinese Taipei) Hsieh Pei-shan / Hung En-tzu (champions)
2. (Chinese Taipei) Sung Shuo-yun / Yu Chien-hui (second round)
3. (Chinese Taipei) Chang Ching-hui / Yang Ching-tun (quarter-finals)
4. (Chinese Taipei) Hsu Yin-hui / Lin Jhih-yun (first round)
5. (Chinese Taipei) Teng Chun-hsun / Yang Chu-yun (withdrew)
6. (Indonesia) Apriyani Rahayu / Febi Setianingrum (second round)
7. (Chinese Taipei) Hu Ling-fang / Jheng Yu-chieh (second round)
8. (Indonesia) Meilysa Trias Puspita Sari / Rachel Allessya Rose (semi-finals)

=== Finals ===
Semi-finals
1	(Chinese Taipei) Hsieh Pei-shan (Chinese Taipei) Hung En-tzu	21	21
(Japan) Rui Hirokami (Japan) Sayaka Hobara	13	15
(Japan) Mizuki Otake (Japan) Miyu Takahashi	21	21
8	(Indonesia) Meilysa Trias Puspita Sari (Indonesia) Rachel Allessya Rose	14	19

Final
1	(Chinese Taipei) Hsieh Pei-shan (Chinese Taipei) Hung En-tzu	21	21
(Japan) Mizuki Otake (Japan) Miyu Takahashi	14	15

=== Top half ===
==== Section 1 ====
First round
1	(Chinese Taipei) Hsieh P-s (Chinese Taipei) Hung E-t	21	21
(Canada) J Dent (Canada) C Lai	14	15
(Chinese Taipei) Hsieh C-y (Chinese Taipei) Ko R-h	15	21	11
(Chinese Taipei) Cheng Y-p (Chinese Taipei) Wang S-m	21	11	21
6	(Indonesia) A Rahayu (Indonesia) F Setianingrum	21	21
Q4	(Malaysia) Cheng S H (Malaysia) Tan Z Y	16	13
(Chinese Taipei) Chen S-y (Chinese Taipei) Hsieh Y-e	15	11
(South Korea) Jeong N-e (South Korea) Lee Y-w	21	21

Second round
1	(Chinese Taipei) Hsieh P-s (Chinese Taipei) Hung E-t	21	21
(Chinese Taipei) Cheng Y-p (Chinese Taipei) Wang S-m	8	13
6	(Indonesia) A Rahayu (Indonesia) F Setianingrum	21	18	8
(South Korea) Jeong N-e (South Korea) Lee Y-w	16	21	21

Quarter-finals
1	(Chinese Taipei) Hsieh P-s (Chinese Taipei) Hung E-t	21	21
(South Korea) Jeong N-e (South Korea) Lee Y-w	13	18

==== Section 2 ====
First round
3	(Chinese Taipei) Chang C-h (Chinese Taipei) Yang C-t	21	21
(Hong Kong) Fan K Y (Hong Kong) Yau M Y	18	19
Q2	(Chinese Taipei) Sung Y-h (Chinese Taipei) Yang Y-h	13	18
(Hong Kong) Fu C Y (Hong Kong) Leung Y Y	21	21
7	(Chinese Taipei) Hu L-f (Chinese Taipei) Jheng Y-c	21	21
PFQ	(Chinese Taipei) Chou Y-a (Chinese Taipei) Huang K-x	10	14
(India) R Ganesh (India) S Sikkandar	8	10
(Japan) R Hirokami (Japan) S Hobara	21	21

Second round
3	(Chinese Taipei) Chang C-h (Chinese Taipei) Yang C-t	21	21
(Hong Kong) Fu C Y (Hong Kong) Leung Y Y	15	15
7	(Chinese Taipei) Hu L-f (Chinese Taipei) Jheng Y-c	21	18	9
(Japan) R Hirokami (Japan) S Hobara	17	21	21

Quarter-finals
3	(Chinese Taipei) Chang C-h (Chinese Taipei) Yang C-t	11	19
(Japan) R Hirokami (Japan) S Hobara	21	21

=== Bottom half ===
==== Section 3 ====
First round
(Japan) M Otake (Japan) M Takahashi	21	21
PFQ	(Chinese Taipei) Chen H-y (Chinese Taipei) Wang Y-y	10	10
(Chinese Taipei) Hsieh M-y (Chinese Taipei) Li Z-q	18	19
SWM	(Thailand) O Jongsathapornparn (Thailand) S Suwachai	21	21
Q3	(Chinese Taipei) Lin C-c (Chinese Taipei) Lin W-c	21	15	15
(Japan) N Hara (Japan) R Kiyose	18	21	21
(Chinese Taipei) Hsu Y-c (Chinese Taipei) Sung Y-h	21	21
4	(Chinese Taipei) Hsu Y-h (Chinese Taipei) Lin J-y	18	19

Second round
(Japan) M Otake (Japan) M Takahashi	21	21
SWM	(Thailand) O Jongsathapornparn (Thailand) S Suwachai	10	9
(Japan) N Hara (Japan) R Kiyose	21	20	21
(Chinese Taipei) Hsu Y-c (Chinese Taipei) Sung Y-h	17	22	23

Quarter-finals
(Japan) M Otake (Japan) M Takahashi	21	21
(Chinese Taipei) Hsu Y-c (Chinese Taipei) Sung Y-h	13	16

==== Section 4 ====
First round
(Malaysia) Ong X Y (Malaysia) C Ting	21	21
Q1	(Chinese Taipei) Chung C-e (Chinese Taipei) Huang T-l	19	19
(Canada) J Cheung (Canada) C Choi	12	16
8	(Indonesia) M T Puspita Sari (Indonesia) R A Rose	21	21
(Chinese Taipei) Chen Y-f (Chinese Taipei) Sun L-c	21	21
(Thailand) P Phatcharaphisutsin (Thailand) N Sukklad	8	12
(Chinese Taipei) Chung K-y (Chinese Taipei) Tseng Y-c	9	14
2	(Chinese Taipei) Sung S-y (Chinese Taipei) Yu C-h	21	21

Second round
(Malaysia) Ong X Y (Malaysia) C Ting	17	18
8	(Indonesia) M T Puspita Sari (Indonesia) R A Rose	21	21
(Chinese Taipei) Chen Y-f (Chinese Taipei) Sun L-c	21	21
2	(Chinese Taipei) Sung S-y (Chinese Taipei) Yu C-h	16	15

Quarter-finals
8	(Indonesia) M T Puspita Sari (Indonesia) R A Rose	21	21
(Chinese Taipei) Chen Y-f (Chinese Taipei) Sun L-c	16	15

== Mixed doubles ==
=== Seeds ===
1. (Chinese Taipei) Yang Po-hsuan / Hu Ling-fang (withdrew)
2. (Japan) Hiroki Midorikawa / Natsu Saito (second round)
3. (Chinese Taipei) Chen Cheng-kuan / Hsu Yin-hui (second round)
4. (Indonesia) Jafar Hidayatullah / Felisha Pasaribu (champions)
5. (Indonesia) Rehan Naufal Kusharjanto / Gloria Emanuelle Widjaja (second round)
6. (Malaysia) Loo Bing Kun / Toh Ee Wei (quarter-finals)
7. (Malaysia) Chen Tang Jie / Chan Wen Tse (semi-finals)
8. (Chinese Taipei) Ye Hong-wei / Nicole Gonzales Chan (quarter-finals)

=== Finals ===
Semi-finals
(Japan) Yuichi Shimogami (Japan) Sayaka Hobara	19	17
(Indonesia) Dejan Ferdinansyah (Indonesia) Siti Fadia Silva Ramadhanti	21	21
4	(Indonesia) Jafar Hidayatullah (Indonesia) Felisha Pasaribu	21	21
7	(Malaysia) Chen Tang Jie (Malaysia) Chan Wen Tse	11	15

Final
(Indonesia) Dejan Ferdinansyah (Indonesia) Siti Fadia Silva Ramadhanti	21	13	17
4	(Indonesia) Jafar Hidayatullah (Indonesia) Felisha Pasaribu	18	21	21

=== Top half ===
==== Section 1 ====
First round
3	(Chinese Taipei) Chen C-k (Chinese Taipei) Hsu Y-h	21	21
(Singapore) T Hee (Singapore) Jin YJ	17	16
(Japan) Y Shimogami (Japan) S Hobara	21	21
(Indonesia) V Y Mulia (Indonesia) L A Kusumawati	8	13
5	(Indonesia) R N Kusharjanto (Indonesia) G E Widjaja	21	18	22
(Chinese Taipei) Wu G-x (Chinese Taipei) Lee C-h	13	21	20
PFQ	(Chinese Taipei) Chang K-c (Chinese Taipei) Lin J-y	14	19
(Thailand) P Horbanluekit (Thailand) S Taerattanachai	21	21

Second round
3	(Chinese Taipei) Chen C-k (Chinese Taipei) Hsu Y-h	16	15
(Japan) Y Shimogami (Japan) S Hobara	21	21
5	(Indonesia) R N Kusharjanto (Indonesia) G E Widjaja	21	15	13
(Thailand) P Horbanluekit (Thailand) S Taerattanachai	13	21	21

Quarter-finals
(Japan) Y Shimogami (Japan) S Hobara	21	21
(Thailand) P Horbanluekit (Thailand) S Taerattanachai	11	18

==== Section 2 ====
First round
6	(Malaysia) Loo B K (Malaysia) Toh E W	21	21
Q4	(Vietnam) Phạm V H (Vietnam) Thân V A	14	10
(Japan) H Nishi (Japan) A Sato	16	21
(South Korea) Ki D-j (South Korea) Jeong N-e	21	23
SWM	(Chinese Taipei) Lu M-c (Chinese Taipei) Hung E-t	21	21
(Indonesia) A Maulana (Indonesia) I C S Jamil	18	13
Q3	(Chinese Taipei) Chen B-y (Chinese Taipei) Sun L-c	13	14
(Indonesia) D Ferdinansyah (Indonesia) S F S Ramadhanti	21	21

Second round
6	(Malaysia) Loo B K (Malaysia) Toh E W	15	23	21
(South Korea) Ki D-j (South Korea) Jeong N-e	21	21	8
SWM	(Chinese Taipei) Lu M-c (Chinese Taipei) Hung E-t	14	16
(Indonesia) D Ferdinansyah (Indonesia) S F S Ramadhanti	21	21

Quarter-finals
6	(Malaysia) Loo B K (Malaysia) Toh E W	22	17	12
(Indonesia) D Ferdinansyah (Indonesia) S F S Ramadhanti	20	21	21

=== Bottom half ===
==== Section 3 ====
First round
(Indonesia) A Syahnawi (Indonesia) N V Marwah	20	21	21
Q1	(Chinese Taipei) Tsai F-c (Chinese Taipei) Sung Y-h	22	11	16
(Macau) Leong I C (Macau) Ng W C	11	16
8	(Chinese Taipei) Ye H-w (Chinese Taipei) N G Chan	21	21
PFQ	(Canada) J Lai (Canada) C Lai	12	17
(Chinese Taipei) Po L-w (Chinese Taipei) Chang C-h	21	21
(Chinese Taipei) Cheng K-w (Chinese Taipei) Liu C-y	10	21
4	(Indonesia) J Hidayatullah (Indonesia) F Pasaribu	21	23

Second round
(Indonesia) A Syahnawi (Indonesia) N V Marwah	16	16
8	(Chinese Taipei) Ye H-w (Chinese Taipei) N G Chan	21	21
(Chinese Taipei) Po L-w (Chinese Taipei) Chang C-h	13	12
4	(Indonesia) J Hidayatullah (Indonesia) F Pasaribu	21	21

Quarter-finals
8	(Chinese Taipei) Ye H-w (Chinese Taipei) N G Chan	16	15
4	(Indonesia) J Hidayatullah (Indonesia) F Pasaribu	21	21

==== Section 4 ====
First round
Q2	(Hong Kong) Chan Y C (Hong Kong) Ng T Y	15	21	17
(Indonesia) M Faza (Indonesia) A S P Pranata	21	11	21
(Hong Kong) Lui C W (Hong Kong) Fu C Y	17	17
7	(Malaysia) Chen T J (Malaysia) Chan W T	21	21
(Indonesia) B Setiabudi (Indonesia) M D Oktavianti	23	21
(Chinese Taipei) Liu K-h (Chinese Taipei) Jheng Y-c	21	16
(Chinese Taipei) Lai P-y (Chinese Taipei) Lin X-m	15	21	14
2	(Japan) H Midorikawa (Japan) N Saito	21	18	21

Second round
(Indonesia) M Faza (Indonesia) A S P Pranata	21	18	17
7	(Malaysia) Chen T J (Malaysia) Chan W T	18	21	21
(Indonesia) B Setiabudi (Indonesia) M D Oktavianti	21	21
2	(Japan) H Midorikawa (Japan) N Saito	11	16

Quarter-finals
7	(Malaysia) Chen T J (Malaysia) Chan W T	22	21
(Indonesia) B Setiabudi (Indonesia) M D Oktavianti	20	10

Preceded by 2025 Swiss Open	BWF World Tour; 2025 BWF season	Succeeded by 2025 Thailand Open
