= Kakeru Kumagai =

Japanese badminton player (born 2002)

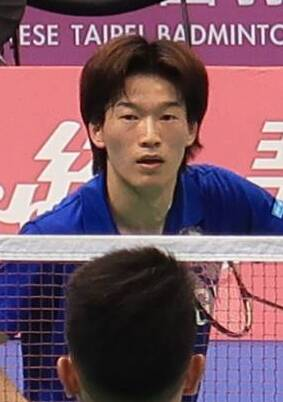
- Kumagai at the 2025 Taipei Open

Personal information
- Born: 5 January 2002 (age 24) Ōsaki, Miyagi Prefecture, Japan
- Height: 1.72 m (5 ft 8 in)
- Weight: 68 kg (150 lb)

Sport
- Country: Japan
- Sport: Badminton
- Handedness: Left
- Coached by: Lee Wan Wah; Hiroyuki Endo

Men's doubles
- Career record: 79 wins, 44 losses (64.23%)
- Highest ranking: 16 (with Hiroki Nishi, 10 November 2026)
- Current ranking: 16 (with Hiroki Nishi, 10 November 2026)
- BWF profile
Medal record
Men's badminton
Representing Japan
Asia Team Championships
Gold medal – first place	2026 Qingdao	Men's team
World Junior Championships
Bronze medal – third place	2019 Kazan	Mixed team

Kakeru Kumagai (熊谷 翔, Kumagai Kakeru; born 5 January 2002) is a Japanese badminton player who competes in men's doubles. A left-handed player, he is a member of the Japanese national team and represents the BIPROGY badminton team. Partnering with Hiroki Nishi, he reached a career-high world ranking of No. 16. Kumagai won his first BWF World Tour title at the 2025 Kaohsiung Masters (Super 100), and was a member of the Japanese squad that won the country's first men's team gold medal at the 2026 Asia Team Championships. A graduate of sport science at Nihon University, Kumagai won the men's doubles title at the 2023 All Japan Inter-Collegiate Championships.

== Early career ==
=== Junior career ===
Kumagai began playing badminton at the Sendai Yamato Junior club before attending Saint Ursula Gakuin Eichi Junior and Senior High School. In 2018, he partnered with Yoshifumi Fujisawa to win the boys' doubles title at the All Japan Junior Championships.

The following year, Kumagai represented Japan at the 2019 World Junior Championships, winning a bronze medal in the mixed team event. In the individual mixed doubles event, he and partner Mizuki Otake reached the quarterfinals, where they were defeated by the Chinese pair Jiang Zhenbang and Li Yijing in three games match (20–22, 21–18, 21–23).

=== University career ===
Kumagai studied sport science at Nihon University. Partnering with Kota Ogawa, he won the men's doubles title at the 2023 All Japan Student Championships (Inter-Collegiate). Consequently selected for the Japanese national B team, the pair made their World Tour debut at the 2023 Indonesia Masters I Super 100, finishing as runners-up.

== Career ==
=== 2024 ===
After graduating from university in April, Kumagai joined the BIPROGY badminton team. He formed a men's doubles partnership with Hiroki Nishi, training under former national players Hiroyuki Endo and Kenichi Hayakawa. In their debut season, the pair finished as runners-up at the Super 100 Odisha Masters and the Kazakhstan International. Domestically, at the All Japan Corporate Team Championships, Kumagai partnered with Yuta Watanabe to defeat the former world No. 1 pair, Takuro Hoki and Yugo Kobayashi, in the final. This victory secured the team title and earned the pair the Men's MVP award.

=== 2025 ===
Kumagai and Nishi claimed their first international title as a pair at the Northern Marianas Open in August, defeating compatriots Haruki Kawabe and Kenta Matsukawa in the final. They subsequently won their first World Tour title at the Super 100 Kaohsiung Masters. The pair also finished as runners-up at the Super 100 Indonesia Masters I and reached the quarterfinals of two Super 500 tournaments: the Japan Masters and the Australian Open. Following these results, they reached a career-high world ranking of No. 32 in November.

=== 2026 ===
Kumagai and Nishi opened the season by making their Super 1000 debut at the Malaysia Open. The pair advanced to the second round, where they were defeated by their compatriots Takuro Hoki and Yugo Kobayashi. He was part of the Japanese team that won Japan's first men's team title at the Asia Team Championships. In the final against China, Kumagai and Nishi defeated He Jiting and Ren Xiangyu in three games to help secure the victory. In April, Kumagai made his Asian Championships debut in Ningbo, China, partnering with Nishi in men's doubles. They defeated Peeratchai Sukphun and Pakkapon Teeraratsakul in the first round before being eliminated in the second round by Liang Weikeng and Wang Chang. In May, Kumagai competed in his first Thomas Cup in Horsens, where the team finished in fifth place. He achieved a career-high world ranking of 16 in November.

== Achievements ==
=== BWF World Tour (1 title, 3 runners-up) ===
The BWF World Tour, which was introduced on 19 March 2017 and was held in 2018, is a series of elite badminton tournaments sanctioned by the Badminton World Federation (BWF). The BWF World Tours are divided into levels of World Tour Finals, Super 1000, Super 750, Super 500, Super 300, and the BWF Tour Super 100.

Men's doubles
Year	Tournament	Level	Partner	Opponent	Score	Result	Ref.
2023 (I)	Indonesia Masters	Super 100	(Japan) Kota Ogawa	(Indonesia) Sabar Karyaman Gutama (Indonesia) Muhammad Reza Pahlevi Isfahani	18–21, 15–21	(silver) Runner-up	
2024	Odisha Masters	Super 100	(Japan) Hiroki Nishi	(China) Huang Di (China) Liu Yang	13–21, 21–19, 25–27	(silver) Runner-up	
2025 (I)	Indonesia Masters	Super 100	(Japan) Hiroki Nishi	(South Korea) Jin Yong (South Korea) Na Sung-seung	19–21, 21–13, 13–21	(silver) Runner-up	
2025	Kaohsiung Masters	Super 100	(Japan) Hiroki Nishi	(Chinese Taipei) Su Ching-heng (Chinese Taipei) Wu Guan-xun	21–18, 21–17	(gold) Winner	

=== BWF International Challenge/Series (1 title, 1 runner-up) ===
Men's doubles
Year	Tournament	Partner	Opponent	Score	Result	Ref.
2024	Kazakhstan International	(Japan) Hiroki Nishi	(France) Lucas Corvée (France) Ronan Labar	14–21, 19–21	(silver) Runner-up	
2025	Northern Marianas Open	(Japan) Hiroki Nishi	(Japan) Haruki Kawabe (Japan) Kenta Matsukawa	21–15, 23–25, 21–13	(gold) Winner	

BWF International Challenge tournament

== Performance timeline ==
Key

W	Won	F	Finalist	SF	Semi-finalist
QF	Quarter-finalist	#R	Rounds 4, 3, 2, 1	RR	Round-robin stage
Q#	Qualification round	A	Absent	w/d	Withdrew
G	Gold	S	Silver	B	Bronze
NH	Not held	N/A	Not applicable	DNQ	Did not qualify

=== National team ===
- Junior level

Team events	2019	Ref.
World Junior Championships	B	

- Senior level

Team events	2023	2024	2025	2026	Ref.
Asia Team Championships	NH	A	NH	G	
Asian Games	A	NH		5th	
Thomas Cup	NH	A	NH	5th	
World University Games	QF	NH	A	NH	

=== Individual competitions ===
==== Junior level ====
- Boys' doubles

Events	2019
World Junior Championships	2R

- Mixed doubles

Events	2019	Ref.
World Junior Championships	QF	

==== Senior level ====
===== Men's doubles =====
Events	2023	2024	2025	2026	Ref.
Asian Championships	A			2R	
Asian Games	A	NH		QF	
World Championships	DNQ	NH	DNQ	2R	
World University Games	3R	NH	A	NH	

Tournament	BWF World Tour				Best	Ref.
Tournament	2023	2024	2025	2026	Best	Ref.
Malaysia Open	A			2R	2R ('26)	
All England Open	A			1R	1R ('26)	
Swiss Open	A			2R	2R ('26)	
Ruichang China Masters	A		2R	A	2R ('25)	
Orléans Masters	A			QF	QF ('26)	
Thailand Open	A		1R	A	1R ('25)	
Malaysia Masters	A			QF	QF ('26)	
Singapore Open	A			1R	1R ('26)	
Indonesia Open	A			1R	1R ('26)	
Australian Open	A		QF	A	QF ('25)	
Macau Open	NH	A	2R	A	2R ('25)	
Japan Open	A			2R	2R ('26)	
China Open	A			QF	QF ('26)	
Taipei Open	A		1R	A	1R ('25)	
Korea Masters	1R	A	1R	A	1R ('23, '25)	
China Masters	A			1R	1R ('26)	
Indonesia Masters Super 100	F	A	F	A	F ('23, '25)	
Indonesia Masters Super 100	2R	A	QF	A	F ('23, '25)	
Arctic Open	A			1R	1R ('26)	
Denmark Open	A			QF	QF ('26)	
Malaysia Super 100	A		SF	A	SF ('25)	
French Open	A			1R	1R ('26)	
Korea Open	A			QF	QF ('26)	
Japan Masters	1R	A	QF	1R	QF ('25)	
Kaohsiung Masters	1R	A	W	A	W ('25)	
Hong Kong Open	A			2R	2R ('26)	
Guwahati Masters	A	QF	A		QF ('24)	
Odisha Masters	A	F	A		F ('24)	
Year-end ranking	82	108	34		16	
Tournament	2023	2024	2025	2026	Best	Ref.

== Wins over top-10 ranked pairs ==
Wins over pairs who were ranked in the world's top 10 at the time the match was played.

#	Partner	Opponent	Rk	Tournament	Rd	Score	Rk	Ref.
1	(Japan) Hiroki Nishi	(England) Ben Lane (England) Sean Vendy	9	2026 Denmark Open	2R	21–19, 23–21	19	

== Record against selected opponents ==
Record against year-end Finals finalists, World Championships semi-finalists, and Olympic quarter-finalists. Accurate as of 16 October 2026.

=== Hiroki Nishi ===
Players	M	W	L	Diff.
(China) Liang Weikeng & Wang Chang	1	0	1	–1
(Chinese Taipei) Lee Jhe-huei & Yang Po-hsuan	1	1	0	+1
(India) Satwiksairaj Rankireddy & Chirag Shetty	1	0	1	–1
(Japan) Takuro Hoki & Yugo Kobayashi	1	0	1	–1
(Malaysia) Goh Sze Fei & Nur Izzuddin	2	0	2	–2
(South Korea) Kim Won-ho & Seo Seung-jae	4	0	4	–4
