= Takumi Nomura =

Japanese badminton player (born 1997)

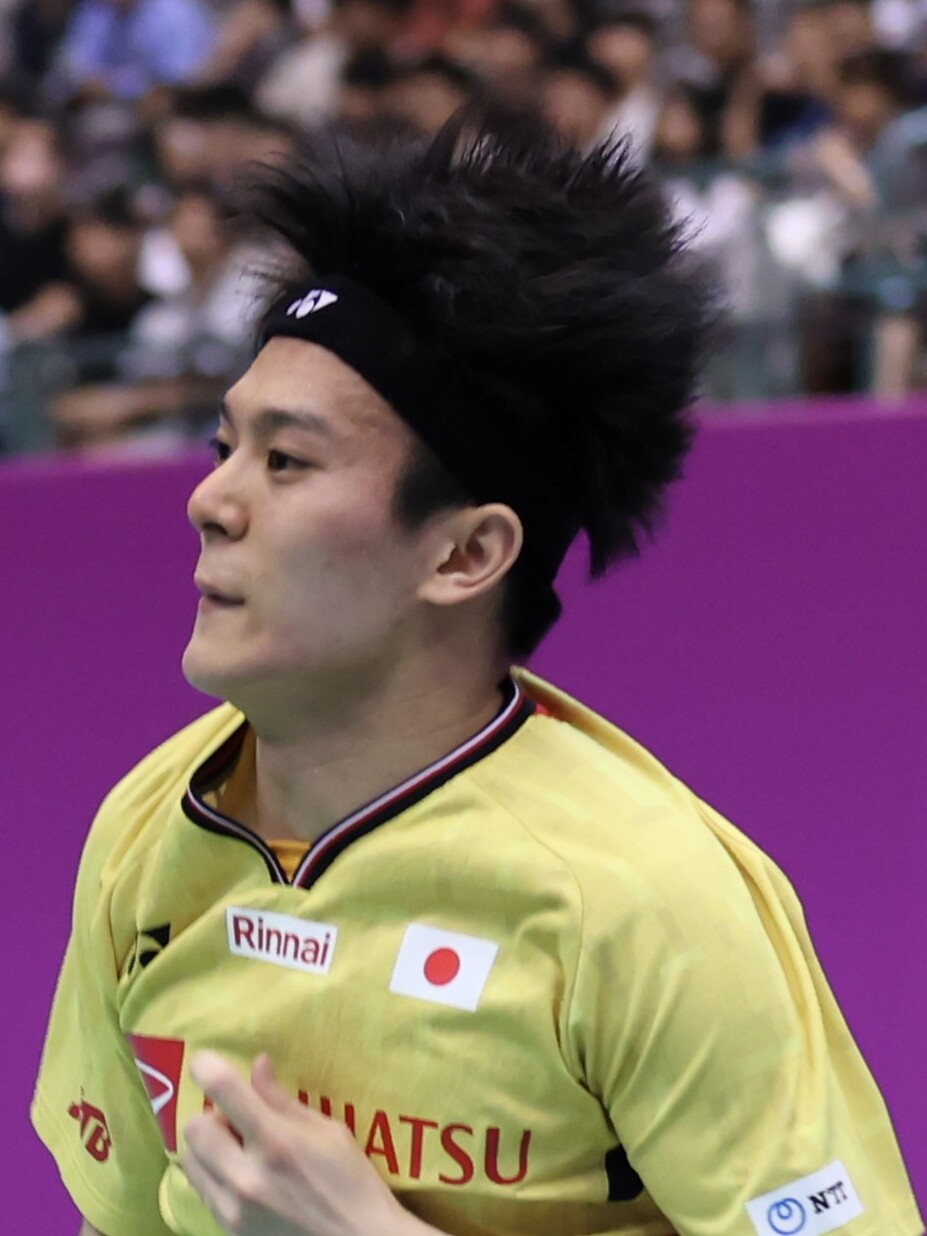
- Nomura at the 2025 Taipei Open

Personal information
- Born: 7 August 1997 (age 29) Miyagi Prefecture, Japan
- Height: 1.71 m (5 ft 7 in)
- Weight: 69 kg (152 lb)

Sport
- Country: Japan
- Sport: Badminton
- Handedness: Right
- Coached by: Lee Wan Wah; Harmono Yuwono

Men's doubles
- Highest ranking: 25 (with Yuichi Shimogami, 6 October 2026)
- Current ranking: 33 (with Yuichi Shimogami, 27 October 2026)
- BWF profile
Medal record
Men's badminton
Representing Japan
Asia Team Championships
Gold medal – first place	2026 Qingdao	Men's team
Asia Mixed Team Championships
Bronze medal – third place	2025 Qingdao	Mixed team

Takumi Nomura (野村 拓海, Nomura Takumi; born 7 August 1997) is a Japanese badminton player from Miyagi Prefecture who competes in men's doubles. A member of the Japanese National Team and Hitachi Information & Telecommunication Engineering team, he has partnered with Yuichi Shimogami since 2022. Together they have won three International Challenge titles. Nomura was part of the Japanese team that won a bronze medal at the 2025 Asia Mixed Team Championships and Japan's first men's team title at the 2026 Asia Team Championships.

== Career ==
=== 2017–2019 ===
Nomura made his international debut in 2017 at the Osaka International, where he reached the men's doubles semifinals with partner Yujiro Nishikawa. After a two-year break from international competition, he returned in August 2019. Partnering with Yoshiki Tsukamoto, he made his BWF World Tour debut at the Super 100 Akita Masters, where they were eliminated in the second round by former world champion Liu Cheng and his partner Huang Kaixiang. This was his only international tournament in 2019.

=== 2022 ===
After another three-year absence from international competition, Nomura returned in 2022 with a new partnership with Yuichi Shimogami. They reached the quarterfinals of the Mongolia International in August. The following month, they competed in two consecutive tournaments in Indonesia, reaching the quarterfinals of the Indonesia International Series before winning their first international title at the Indonesia International Challenge.

=== 2023 ===
In 2023, Nomura and Shimogami competed in several International Challenge tournaments, reaching the quarterfinals at the Maldives International, the Mongolia International, and the Indonesia International. On the BWF World Tour, their best result was reaching the second round at the Vietnam Open. As of 12 June 2023, they entered the world's top 100 for the first time, reaching a career-high ranking of No. 98

=== 2024 ===
In 2024, Nomura and Shimogami joined Japan's national B team. They won back-to-back International Challenge titles in July at the Northern Marianas Open and the Saipan International. The pair also reached the semifinals at the Indonesia International in August and the Vietnam Open in September. They concluded the year as runners-up at the All Japan Championships, where they were defeated in the final by Kyohei Yamashita and Hiroki Midorikawa.

=== 2025 ===
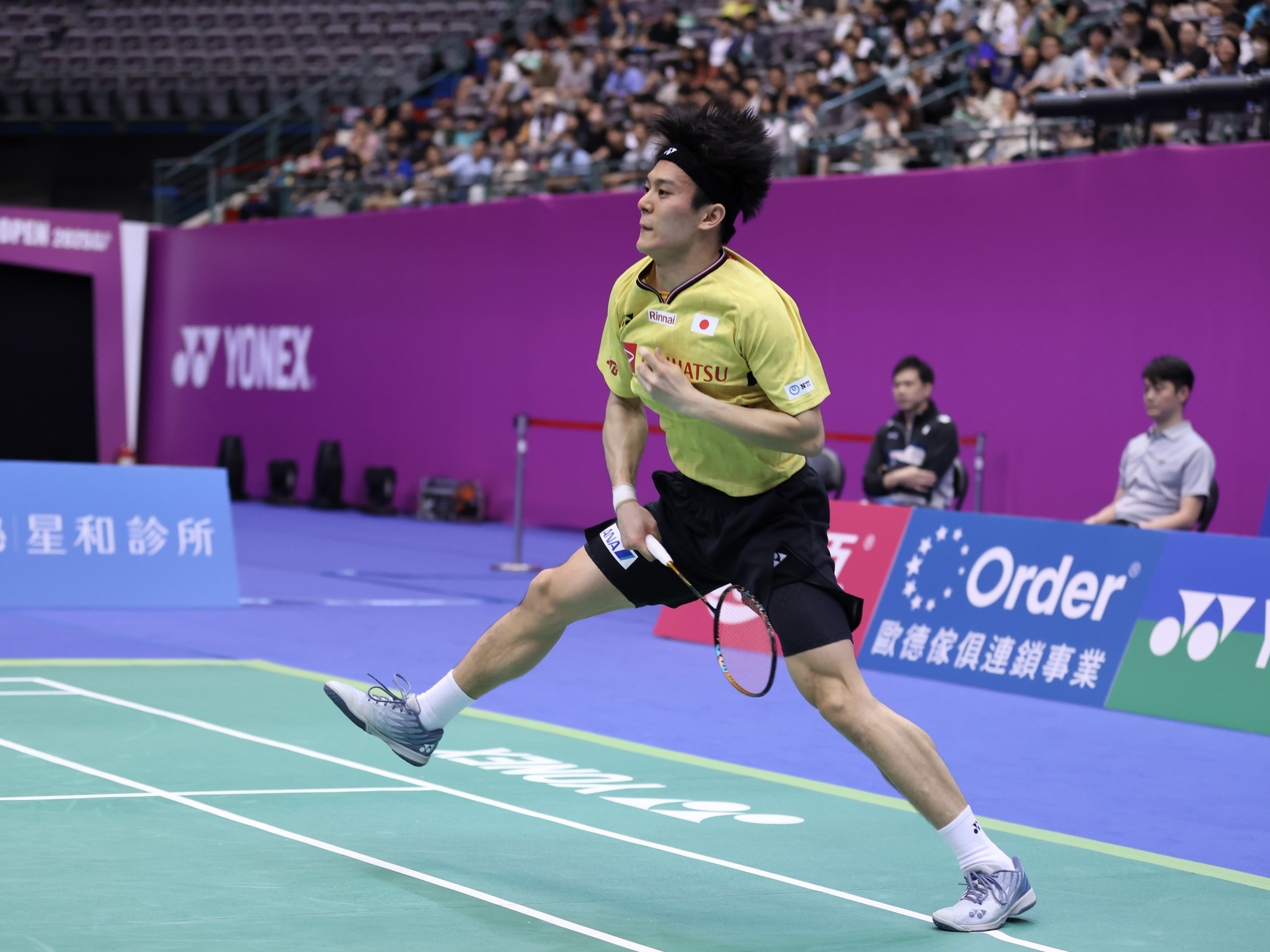
Nomura competing at the 2025 Kaohsiung Masters.

In 2025, Nomura and Shimogami were selected for the Japanese national team. They began the season at the Asia Mixed Team Championships in Qingdao, China, contributing to Japan's bronze medal. On the BWF World Tour, they reached the semifinals of two Super 300 tournaments: the German Open in March and the Taipei Open in May. They debuted at the Asian Championships in April with a first-round elimination. In June, they competed in their first Super 1000 tournament at the Indonesia Open, where they were eliminated in the second round by the eventual champions Kim Won-ho and Seo Seung-jae of South Korea (17–21, 21–11, 19–21). As of 10 June 2025, Nomura and Shimogami had achieved a career-high world ranking of No. 32.

=== 2026 ===
Nomura was part of the Japanese team that won Japan's first men's team title at the Asia Team Championships. In May, he competed in his first Thomas Cup in Horsens, where the team finished in fifth place. During the group stage, Nomura and Shimogami played in the second doubles match and defeated Malaysia's Nur Izzuddin and Soh Wooi Yik, contributing to a 3–2 overall victory that secured Japan's advancement as group winners.

== Achievements ==
=== BWF International Challenge/Series (3 titles) ===
Men's doubles
Year	Tournament	Partner	Opponent	Score	Result	Ref
2022 (I)	Indonesia International	(Japan) Yuichi Shimogami	(Indonesia) Berry Angriawan (Indonesia) Rian Agung Saputro	21–16, 21–15	(gold) Winner	
2024	Northern Marianas Open	(Japan) Yuichi Shimogami	(Japan) Mahiro Kaneko (Japan) Shunya Ota	22–20, 21–18	(gold) Winner	
2024	Saipan International	(Japan) Yuichi Shimogami	(Japan) Tori Aizawa (Japan) Daisuke Sano	21–19, 23–21	(gold) Winner	
