= Yuichi Shimogami =

Japanese badminton player (born 1998)

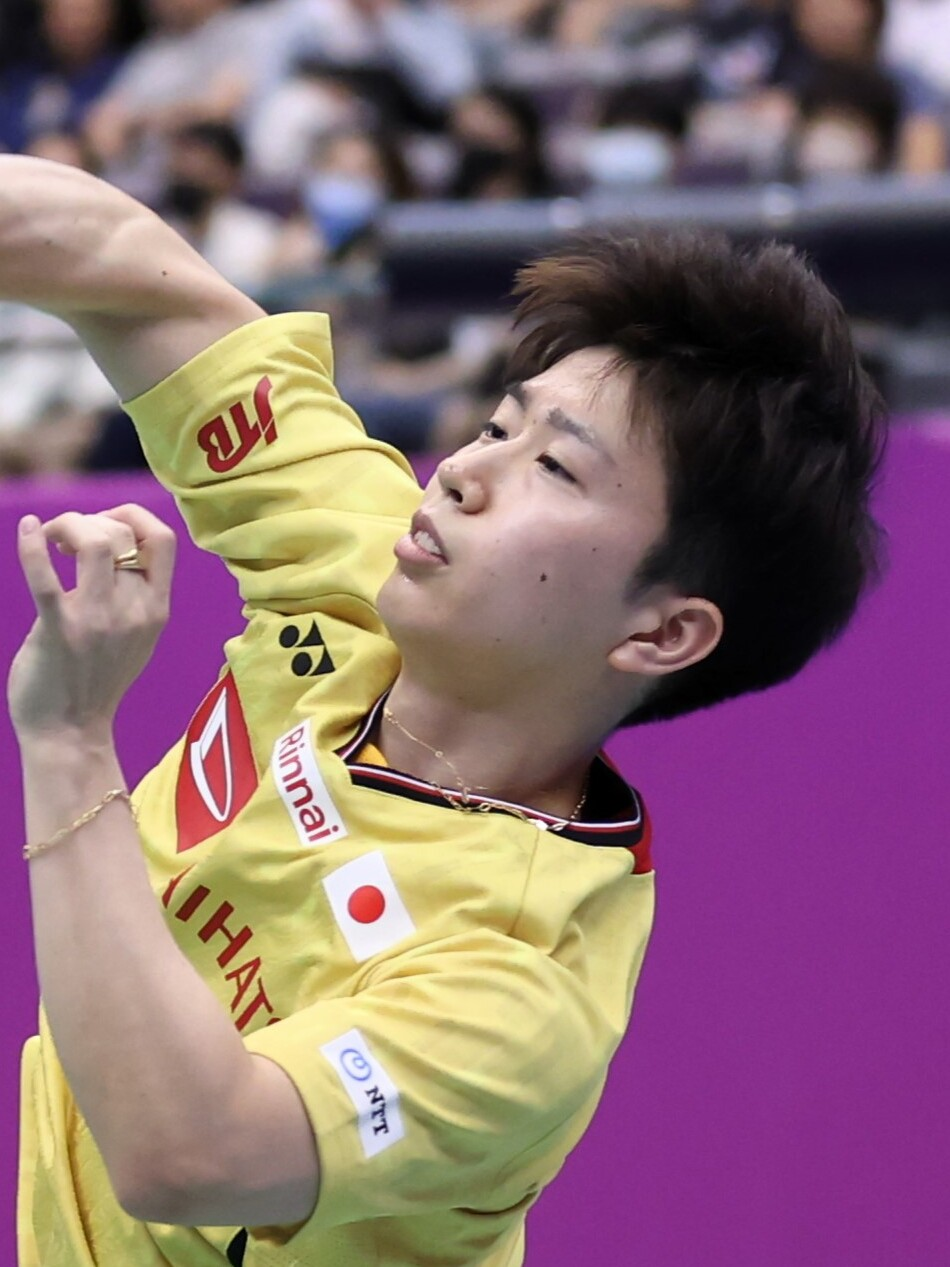
- Shimogami at the 2025 Taipei Open

Personal information
- Born: 5 March 1998 (age 28) Kumamoto Prefecture, Japan
- Height: 1.67 m (5 ft 6 in)
- Weight: 63.4 kg (140 lb)

Sport
- Country: Japan
- Sport: Badminton
- Handedness: Right
- Coached by: Lee Wan Wah; Harmono Yuwono (Hitachi)

Men's & mixed doubles
- Career record: XD 43 wins, 24 losses (64.18%); MD 45 wins, 32 losses (58.44%)
- Highest ranking: 25 (MD with Takumi Nomura, 6 October 2026); 13 (XD with Sayaka Hobara, 21 July 2026)
- Current ranking: 33 (MD with Takumi Nomura); 19 (XD with Sayaka Hobara) (10 November 2026)
- BWF profile
Medal record
Men's badminton
Representing Japan
Sudirman Cup
Bronze medal – third place	2025 Xiamen	Mixed team
Asia Team Championships
Gold medal – first place	2026 Qingdao	Men's team
Asia Mixed Team Championships
Bronze medal – third place	2025 Qingdao	Mixed team

Yuichi Shimogami (霜上 雄一, Shimogami Yūichi; born 5 March 1998) is a Japanese badminton player from Kumamoto Prefecture who specializes in doubles. He is a member of the Japanese national team and plays for the Hitachi Information & Telecommunication Engineering badminton team. Shimogami reached a career-high world ranking of No. 25 in men's doubles with Takumi Nomura, and No. 13 in mixed doubles with Sayaka Hobara. Shimogami won both the men's and mixed doubles titles at the 2024 Northern Marianas Open. In mixed doubles, he finished as runners-up at the 2024 Malaysia Super 100.

In team events, he contributed to Japan securing bronze medals at the 2025 Sudirman Cup and the 2025 Asia Mixed Team Championships, as well as the country's first men's team title at the 2026 Asia Team Championships.

== Early life and education ==
Yuichi Shimogami was born in Kumamoto Prefecture, Japan. He began playing badminton at the age of 10. His father, Kazuhiro Shimogami, is a former Japanese men's singles player who represented Japan at the 1998 Asian Games and also won the 1992 All Japan Championships. During his youth, Shimogami played for the Frame Club while attending Sumiyoshi Elementary School and Taimei Junior High School. He later enrolled at Yatsushiro Higashi High School. In 2015, he reached the boys' singles quarterfinals at both the National High School Invitational Tournament and the National High School Championships (Inter-High).

Shimogami subsequently attended his father's alma mater, Nippon Sport Science University. There, he placed third in the men's doubles event at the 2019 Inter-College Championships. Following his graduation in 2020, he joined the corporate badminton team at Hitachi Information & Telecommunication Engineering.

== Career ==
=== 2022–2023 ===
In 2022, Shimogami formed a men's doubles partnership with Takumi Nomura. He made his senior international debut, notably without having competed on the international junior circuit. The following month, they won their first title together at the Indonesia International. In 2023, he made his World Tour debut at the Vietnam Open in September, reaching the second round. As of 12 June 2023, they broke into the world's top 100 for the first time, reaching a new career-high ranking of No. 98.

=== 2024 ===
In 2024, Shimogami was selected for the Japan's national B team. He began the season in March, reaching the mixed doubles semifinals with Sayaka Hobara at the Ruichang China Masters in March. In July, he won three International Challenge titles: both the men's and mixed doubles events at the Northern Marianas Open, followed by another men's doubles title at the Saipan International a week later. He also reached the semifinals in both disciplines at the Vietnam Open in September. In October, Shimogami and Hobara were mixed doubles runners-up at the Malaysia Super 100. The year concluded in December at the All Japan Championships, where he and Nomura finished as men's doubles runners-up, defeated by Kyohei Yamashita and Hiroki Midorikawa in the final.

=== 2025 ===
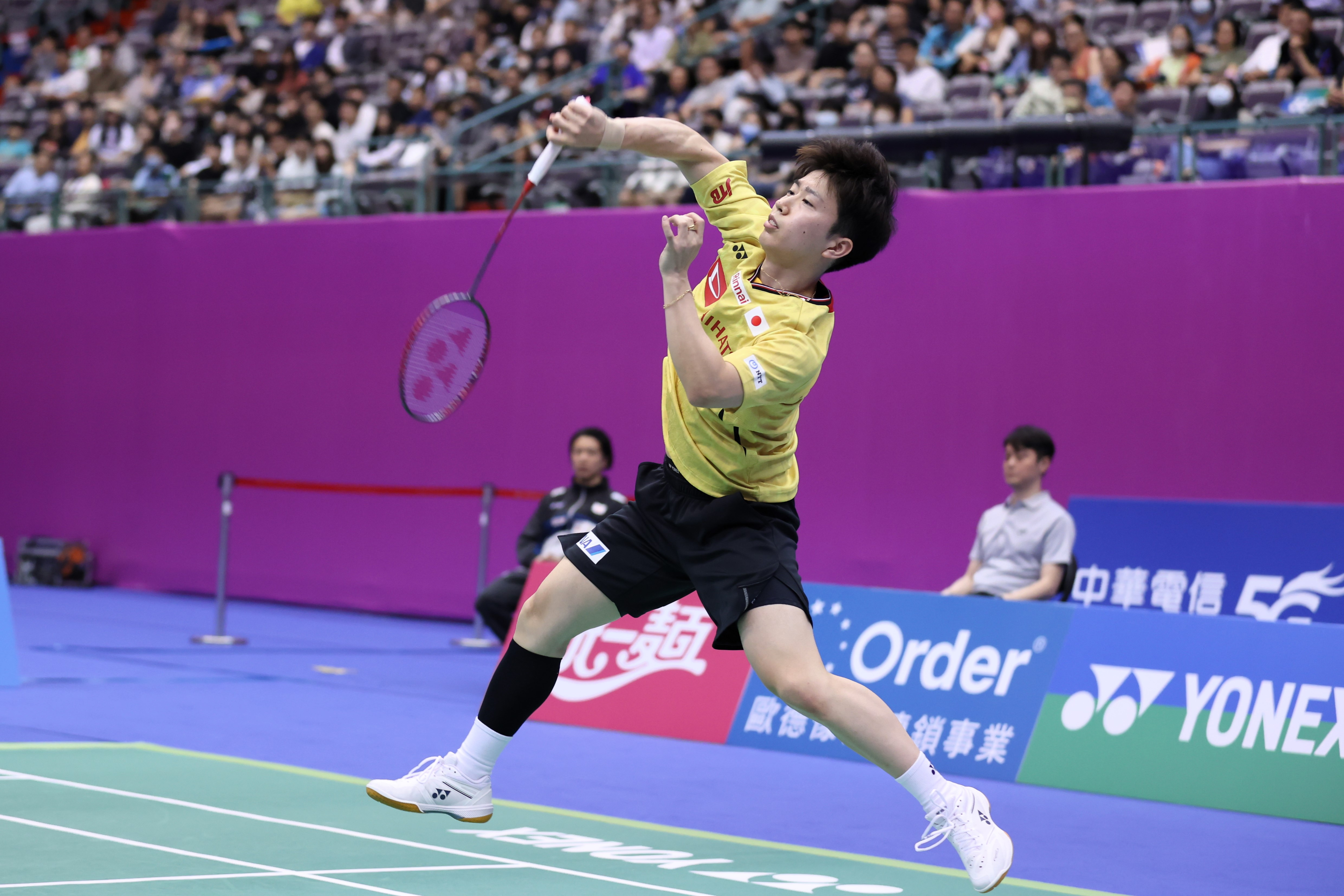
Shimogami competing at the 2025 Kaohsiung Masters.

Promoted to the national team in 2025, Shimogami continued competing with Nomura and Hobara. He contributed to Japan's bronze medals at the Asia Mixed Team Championships in February and the Sudirman Cup in May. On the World Tour, Shimogami and Nomura reached the semifinals of the German Open in March and the Taipei Open in May. They also debuted at the Asian Championships in April with a first-round exit. In June, they competed in their first Super 1000 tournament at the Indonesia Open, where they were eliminated in the second round by eventual champions Kim Won-ho and Seo Seung-jae of South Korea. By 22 July 2025, Shimogami achieved a career-high world ranking of No. 31 in men's doubles with Nomura.

In mixed doubles, Shimogami and Hobara reached the quarterfinals of the Singapore Open and the semifinals of the Taipei Open. They also debuted at the Asian Championships and competed in their first Super 1000 tournament at the Indonesia Open, advancing to the second round of both tournaments. Shimogami reached a new career-high of No. 20 in mixed doubles with Hobara on 29 July 2025.

=== 2026 ===
Shimogami was part of the Japanese team that won Japan's first men's team title at the Asia Team Championships. In May, he competed in his first Thomas Cup in Horsens, where the team finished in fifth place. During the group stage, Shimogami and Nomura played in the second doubles match and defeated Malaysia's Nur Izzuddin and Soh Wooi Yik, contributing to a 3–2 overall victory that secured Japan's advancement as group winners.

In mixed doubles, Shimogami and Hobara reached their first Super 750 final at the Singapore Open, marking the best finish of their partnership to date. During their tournament run, they defeated All England champions Ye Hong-wei and Nicole Gonzales Chan in the first round, followed by a quarterfinal upset over second-seeded defending champions Dechapol Puavaranukroh and Supissara Paewsampran. They finished as runners-up, losing the final to Denmark's Mathias Christiansen and Alexandra Bøje.

Ahead of the Asian Games, Shimogami sustained a right knee injury that affected his movement during the mixed doubles event. The injury continued to hamper his performance at the Japan Masters, where he and Hobara withdrew from the second round.

== Achievements ==
=== BWF World Tour (2 runners-up) ===
The BWF World Tour, which was announced on 19 March 2017 and implemented in 2018, is a series of elite badminton tournaments sanctioned by the Badminton World Federation (BWF). The BWF World Tours are divided into levels of World Tour Finals, Super 1000, Super 750, Super 500, Super 300, and the BWF Tour Super 100.

Mixed doubles
Year	Tournament	Level	Partner	Opponent	Score	Result	Ref.
2024	Malaysia Super 100	Super 100	(Japan) Sayaka Hobara	(Chinese Taipei) Ye Hong-wei (Chinese Taipei) Nicole Gonzales Chan	19–21, 21–12, 20–22	(silver) Runner-up	
2026	Singapore Open	Super 750	(Japan) Sayaka Hobara	(Denmark) Mathias Christiansen (Denmark) Alexandra Bøje	21–17, 12–21, 12–21	(silver) Runner-up	

=== BWF International Challenge/Series (4 titles, 1 runner-up) ===
Men's doubles
Year	Tournament	Partner	Opponent	Score	Result	Ref.
2022 (I)	Indonesia International	(Japan) Takumi Nomura	(Indonesia) Berry Angriawan (Indonesia) Rian Agung Saputro	21–16, 21–15	(gold) Winner	
2024	Northern Marianas Open	(Japan) Takumi Nomura	(Japan) Mahiro Kaneko (Japan) Shunya Ota	22–20, 21–18	(gold) Winner	
2024	Saipan International	(Japan) Takumi Nomura	(Japan) Tori Aizawa (Japan) Daisuke Sano	21–19, 23–21	(gold) Winner	

Mixed doubles
Year	Tournament	Partner	Opponent	Score	Result	Ref.
2024	Northern Marianas Open	(Japan) Sayaka Hobara	(Japan) Tori Aizawa (Japan) Hina Osawa	21–19, 21–12	(gold) Winner	
2024	Saipan International	(Japan) Sayaka Hobara	(Japan) Hiroki Nishi (Japan) Akari Sato	11–21, 10–21	(silver) Runner-up	

BWF International Challenge tournament
