= Hiroki Nishi =

Japanese badminton player (born 2003)

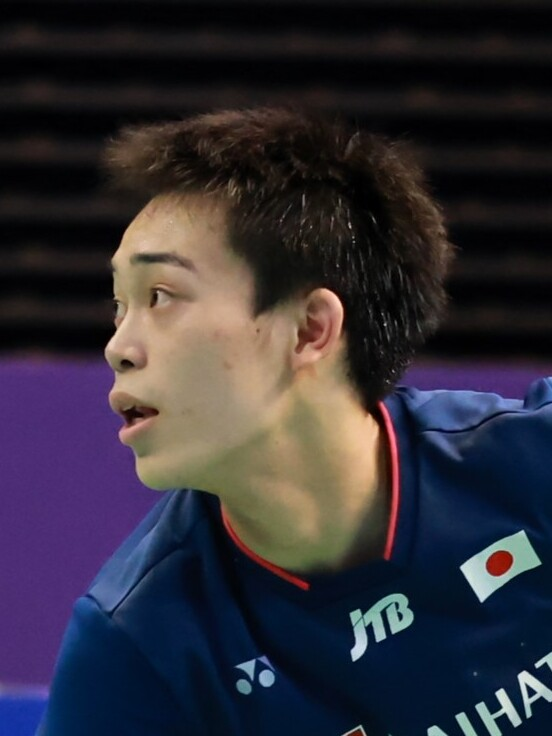
- Nishi in 2023

Personal information
- Born: 21 March 2003 (age 23) Kyoto, Kyoto Prefecture, Japan
- Height: 1.70 m (5 ft 7 in)
- Weight: 64 kg (141 lb)

Sport
- Country: Japan
- Sport: Badminton
- Handedness: Right
- Coached by: Lee Wan Wah; Hiroyuki Endo

Men's & mixed doubles
- Career record: MD: 58 wins, 29 losses (66.67%); XD: 45 wins, 21 losses (68.18%)
- Highest ranking: 16 (MD with Kakeru Kumagai, 10 November 2026); 30 (XD with Akari Sato, 30 July 2024)
- Current ranking: 16 (MD with Kakeru Kumagai, 10 November 2026)
- BWF profile
Medal record
Men's badminton
Representing Japan
Asia Team Championships
Gold medal – first place	2026 Qingdao	Men's team
Asia Mixed Team Championships
Bronze medal – third place	2025 Qingdao	Mixed team
World Junior Championships
Bronze medal – third place	2019 Kazan	Mixed team

Hiroki Nishi (西 大輝, Nishi Hiroki; born 21 March 2003) is a Japanese badminton player who specializes in doubles. He is a member of the Japanese national team and plays for the BIPROGY team. Nishi has won three BWF World Tour Super 100 titles: two in mixed doubles with Akari Sato and one in men's doubles with Kakeru Kumagai. He has achieved a career-high world ranking of No. 16 in men's doubles and No. 30 in mixed doubles. In team events, he contributed to Japan securing bronze medals at the 2025 Asia Mixed Team Championships, as well as the country's first men's team title at the 2026 Asia Team Championships.

== Early career ==
Nishi began playing badminton at the Nagaokakyo City Sports Shonendan junior club. He attended Oharano Junior High School and Kyoto Prefectural Otokuni High School. He represented Japan at the 2019 World Junior Championships, where the team earned a bronze medal in the mixed team event.

After graduating in 2021, Nishi enrolled at Ryukoku University, where he studied Sports Science. During his time at university, he partnered with Akari Sato in mixed doubles. The pair placed third at the All Japan Championships, which led to their selection for the 2023 Japanese national B team. They were the first student-athletes from the Ryukoku University Badminton Club to be selected for the national team. In his final year at university, Nishi won the mixed doubles title at the 2024 All Japan Inter-Collegiate Championships with partner Sumire Nakade.

== Career ==
=== 2023 ===
In 2023, Nishi and Sato won three international titles. They secured their first World Tour title at the Vietnam Open, defeating Ruttanapak Oupthong and Jhenicha Sudjaipraparat in the final. The pair subsequently won the Kaohsiung Masters by defeating the top-seeded Indonesian pair of Dejan Ferdinansyah and Gloria Emanuelle Widjaja. They also won the Indonesia International and finished as runners-up at the Indonesia Masters Super 100.

=== 2024 ===
In 2024, Nishi competed in both men's and mixed doubles. He formed a men's doubles partnership with Kakeru Kumagai. The pair finished as runners-up at the Super 100 Odisha Masters and the Kazakhstan International. In mixed doubles, Nishi and Sato won the Saipan International title and advanced to the quarter-finals of the Super 300 Orléans Masters. The pair achieved a career-high world ranking of No. 30 on 30 July. On the national circuit, they finished as runners-up at the All Japan Championships after an injury to Sato forced them to retire in the final.

=== 2025 ===
Nishi turned professional on 1 April, joining the BIPROGY team following his graduation from university. He was part of the Japanese squad that earned a bronze medal at the Asia Mixed Team Championships. In mixed doubles, he and Sato made their Asian Championships debut, eliminated in the first round after winning their initial round-robin matches. The pair later secured their first national title at the Japan Ranking Circuit, defeating Olympic medalist Yuta Watanabe and Misaki Matsutomo in the final. Their partnership concluded on 1 July, following Sato's retirement from professional badminton.

Focusing on men's doubles with Kumagai, Nishi won his first international title as a pair at the Northern Marianas Open. On the World Tour, the duo won the Super 100 Kaohsiung Masters and finished as runners-up at the Super 100 Indonesia Masters I. They also reached the semi-finals of the Malaysia Super 100 and the quarter-finals at both the Australian Open and the Japan Masters. These results helped Nishi reach a career-high world ranking of 32 in men's doubles by late November.

=== 2026 ===
Nishi and Kumagai began the season with their Super 1000 debut at the Malaysia Open. The pair advanced to the second round, where they lost to compatriots Takuro Hoki and Yugo Kobayashi. He was part of the Japanese team that won Japan's first men's team title at the Asia Team Championships. In the final against China, Nishi and Kumagai defeated He Jiting and Ren Xiangyu in three games. In April, Nishi competed in men's doubles at the Asian Championships in Ningbo, China, alongside Kumagai. They defeated Peeratchai Sukphun and Pakkapon Teeraratsakul in the first round before being eliminated in the second round by Liang Weikeng and Wang Chang. In May, Nishi competed in his first Thomas Cup in Horsens, where the team finished in fifth place. He achieved a career-high world ranking of 16 in November.

== Achievements ==
=== BWF World Tour (3 titles, 3 runners-up) ===
The BWF World Tour, which was announced on 19 March 2017 and implemented in 2018, is a series of elite badminton tournaments sanctioned by the Badminton World Federation (BWF). The BWF World Tours are divided into levels of World Tour Finals, Super 1000, Super 750, Super 500, Super 300, and the BWF Tour Super 100.

Men's doubles
Year	Tournament	Level	Partner	Opponent	Score	Result	Ref.
2024	Odisha Masters	Super 100	(Japan) Kakeru Kumagai	(China) Huang Di (China) Liu Yang	13–21, 21–19, 25–27	(silver) Runner-up	
2025 (I)	Indonesia Masters	Super 100	(Japan) Kakeru Kumagai	(South Korea) Jin Yong (South Korea) Na Sung-seung	19–21, 21–13, 13–21	(silver) Runner-up	
2025	Kaohsiung Masters	Super 100	(Japan) Kakeru Kumagai	(Chinese Taipei) Su Ching-heng (Chinese Taipei) Wu Guan-xun	21–18, 21–17	(gold) Winner	

Mixed doubles
Year	Tournament	Level	Partner	Opponent	Score	Result	Ref.
2023 (I)	Indonesia Masters	Super 100	(Japan) Akari Sato	(Malaysia) Yap Roy King (Malaysia) Valeree Siow	21–13, 14–21, 14–21	(silver) Runner-up	
2023	Vietnam Open	Super 100	(Japan) Akari Sato	(Thailand) Ruttanapak Oupthong (Thailand) Jhenicha Sudjaipraparat	15–21, 21–18, 21–14	(gold) Winner	
2023	Kaohsiung Masters	Super 100	(Japan) Akari Sato	(Indonesia) Dejan Ferdinansyah (Indonesia) Gloria Emanuelle Widjaja	22–20, 12–21, 21–14	(gold) Winner	

=== BWF International Challenge/Series (3 titles, 1 runner-up) ===
Men's doubles
Year	Tournament	Partner	Opponent	Score	Result	Ref.
2024	Kazakhstan International	(Japan) Kakeru Kumagai	(France) Lucas Corvée (France) Ronan Labar	14–21, 19–21	(silver) Runner-up	
2025	Northern Marianas Open	(Japan) Kakeru Kumagai	(Japan) Haruki Kawabe (Japan) Kenta Matsukawa	21–15, 23–25, 21–13	(gold) Winner	

Mixed doubles
Year	Tournament	Partner	Opponent	Score	Result	Ref.
2023 (II)	Indonesia International	(Japan) Akari Sato	(Malaysia) Choong Hon Jian (Malaysia) Go Pei Kee	22–20, 18–21, 21–14	(gold) Winner	
2024	Saipan International	(Japan) Akari Sato	(Japan) Yuichi Shimogami (Japan) Sayaka Hobara	21–11, 21–10	(gold) Winner	

BWF International Challenge tournament

== Performance timeline ==
Key

W	Won	F	Finalist	SF	Semi-finalist
QF	Quarter-finalist	#R	Rounds 4, 3, 2, 1	RR	Round-robin stage
Q#	Qualification round	A	Absent	w/d	Withdrew
G	Gold	S	Silver	B	Bronze
NH	Not held	N/A	Not applicable	DNQ	Did not qualify

=== National team ===
- Junior level

Team events	2019	Ref
World Junior Championships	B	

- Senior level

Team events	2026	Ref
Asia Team Championships	G	
Asian Games	5th	
Thomas Cup	5th	

=== Individual competitions ===
==== Junior level ====
- Boys' doubles

Events	2019
World Junior Championships	3R

- Mixed doubles

Events	2019	Ref
World Junior Championships	3R	

==== Senior level ====
===== Men's doubles =====
Events	2026	Ref
Asian Championships	2R	
Asian Games	QF	
World Championships	2R	

Tournament	BWF World Tour			Best	Ref
Tournament	2024	2025	2026	Best	Ref
Malaysia Open	A		2R	2R ('26)	
All England Open	A		1R	1R ('26)	
Swiss Open	A		2R	2R ('26)	
Ruichang China Masters	A	2R	A	2R ('25)	
Orléans Masters	A		QF	QF ('26)	
Thailand Open	A	1R	A	1R ('25)	
Malaysia Masters	A		QF	QF ('26)	
Singapore Open	A		1R	1R ('26)	
Indonesia Open	A		1R	1R ('26)	
Australian Open	A	QF	A	QF ('25)	
Macau Open	A	2R	A	2R ('25)	
Japan Open	A		2R	2R ('26)	
China Open	A		QF	QF ('26)	
Taipei Open	A	1R	A	1R ('25)	
Korea Masters	A	1R	A	1R ('23, '25)	
China Masters	A		1R	1R ('26)	
Indonesia Masters Super 100	A	F	A	F ('23, '25)	
Indonesia Masters Super 100	A	QF	A	F ('23, '25)	
Arctic Open	A		1R	1R ('26)	
Denmark Open	A		QF	QF ('26)	
Malaysia Super 100	A	SF	A	SF ('25)	
French Open	A		1R	1R ('26)	
Korea Open	A		QF	QF ('26)	
Japan Masters	A	QF	1R	QF ('25)	
Kaohsiung Masters	A	W	A	W ('25)	
Hong Kong Open	A		2R	2R ('26)	
Guwahati Masters	QF	A		QF ('24)	
Odisha Masters	F	A		F ('24)	
Year-end ranking	108	34		16	
Tournament	2024	2025	2026	Best	Ref

== Wins over top-10 ranked pairs ==
Wins over pairs who were ranked in the world's top 10 at the time the match was played.

#	Partner	Opponent	Rk	Tournament	Rd	Score	Rk	Ref.
1	(Japan) Kakeru Kumagai	(England) Ben Lane (England) Sean Vendy	9	2026 Denmark Open	2R	21–19, 23–21	19	

== Record against selected opponents ==
Record against year-end Finals finalists, World Championships semi-finalists, and Olympic quarter-finalists. Accurate as of 16 October 2026.

=== Kakeru Kumagai ===
Players	M	W	L	Diff.
(China) Liang Weikeng & Wang Chang	1	0	1	–1
(Chinese Taipei) Lee Jhe-huei & Yang Po-hsuan	1	1	0	+1
(India) Satwiksairaj Rankireddy & Chirag Shetty	1	0	1	–1

Players	M	W	L	Diff.
(Japan) Takuro Hoki & Yugo Kobayashi	1	0	1	–1
(Malaysia) Goh Sze Fei & Nur Izzuddin	2	0	2	–2
(South Korea) Kim Won-ho & Seo Seung-jae	4	0	4	–4

=== Akari Sato ===
Players	M	W	L	Diff.
(China) Jiang Zhenbang & Wei Yaxin	1	0	1	–1
(Indonesia) Amri Syahnawi & Nita Violina Marwah	2	0	2	–2
(South Korea) Kim Won-ho & Jeong Na-eun	1	0	1	–1
