= Northern Marianas Open =

International badminton tournament

The Northern Marianas Open is an international badminton tournament held in Saipan, Commonwealth of the Northern Mariana Islands. The event is part of the Badminton World Federation's International Challenge and part of the Badminton Oceania circuit. It was held for the first time in 2023.

The 2026 edition, sponsored as the Yonex Northern Marianas Open, represents a significant recovery milestone for the region. It is the first international sporting events hosted on the islands since Super Typhoon Sinlaku struck in April 2026.

== List of winners ==
=== Northern Marianas Open ===
Year	Men's singles	Women's singles	Men's doubles	Women's doubles	Mixed doubles	Ref
2023	(Chinese Taipei) Liao Jhuo-fu	(South Korea) Kim Ga-ram	(Chinese Taipei) Wei Chun-wei (Chinese Taipei) Wu Guan-xun	(Chinese Taipei) Hsu Ya-ching (Chinese Taipei) Lin Wan-ching	(South Korea) Wang Chan (South Korea) Shin Seung-chan	
2024	(Chinese Taipei) Cheng Kai	(Japan) Kaoru Sugiyama	(Japan) Takumi Nomura (Japan) Yuichi Shimogami	(Japan) Mizuki Otake (Japan) Miyu Takahashi	(Japan) Yuichi Shimogami (Japan) Sayaka Hobara	
2025	(Japan) Yudai Okimoto	(Japan) Sakura Masuki	(Japan) Kakeru Kumagai (Japan) Hiroki Nishi	(Japan) Ririna Hiramoto (Japan) Kokona Ishikawa	(Japan) Akira Koga (Japan) Yuho Imai	
2026	(South Korea) Park Sang-yong	(Japan) Sakura Masuki	(Japan) Tori Aizawa (Japan) Daisuke Sano	(South Korea) Moon In-seo (South Korea) Park Seul	(South Korea) Lee Hyeong-woo (South Korea) Park Seul	

=== Northern Marianas International ===
Year	Men's singles	Women's singles	Men's doubles	Women's doubles	Mixed doubles	Ref
2025	(South Korea) Yoo Tae-bin	(South Korea) Park Ga-eun	(South Korea) Kim Jae-hyeon (South Korea) Lee Sang-won	(South Korea) Jang Eun-seo (South Korea) Kim Yu-jung	(South Korea) Kim Jae-hyeon (South Korea) Kim Min-ji	

== Performances by nation ==
=== Northern Marianas Open ===
As of 2026 edition

Pos	Nation	MS	WS	MD	WD	XD	Total
1	Japan	1	3	3	2	2	11
2	South Korea	1	1	0	1	2	5
3	Chinese Taipei	2	0	1	1	0	4
Total		4	4	4	4	4	20

=== Northern Marianas International ===
As of 2025 edition

Pos	Nation	MS	WS	MD	WD	XD	Total
1	South Korea	1	1	1	1	1	5
Total		1	1	1	1	1	5
