= 2026 Badminton Asia Team Championships =

Tournament details
- Dates: 3–8 February 2026
- Edition: 6th
- Venue: Qingdao Conson Gymnasium
- Location: Qingdao, China

Champions
- Men's teams: Japan
- Women's teams: South Korea

The 2026 Badminton Asia Team Championships (officially known as the Tsingtao Badminton Asia Team Championships 2026 for sponsorship reasons) was the sixth edition of the Badminton Asia Team Championships. The tournament was organised by Badminton Asia and took place at the Qingdao Conson Gymnasium in Qingdao, China, from 3 to 8 February 2026. It served as the Asian qualifiers for the 2026 Thomas & Uber Cup to be held in Horsens, Denmark.

== Background ==
The 2026 Badminton Asia Team Championships crowned the top male and female national badminton teams in Asia and has also served as the Asian qualification event for the 2026 Thomas & Uber Cup. It is sanctioned by the Badminton World Federation. China and India were the defending champions of the men's and women's categories, respectively.

=== Competition format ===
The competition begins with a group stage: all participating teams are divided into four groups of two or three teams each. Each team plays each other once, with the top two teams advancing to the knockout stage. A match is won by the team that first wins three games. The eight teams that qualify will be drawn and compete in a knockout format until the final.

Tie-breaker

Team ranking within a group is determined based on the following criteria: number of wins; match difference; game difference; and points difference. If two teams are tied after a criterion is applied, the winner of the match between the two teams will be ranked higher. A draw will be held to determine ranking if there are still teams tied after all criteria are applied.

=== Hosting ===
China will be hosting the Badminton Asia Team Championships for the first time ever, with Qingdao selected as the host city. They previously hosted the 2025 Badminton Asia Mixed Team Championships at the same venue.

== Schedule ==
| Day, Date | Time | Phase |
|---|---|---|
| Tuesday, 3 February | 11.00 | Group Stage |
| Tuesday, 3 February | 17.00 | Group Stage |
| Wednesday, 4 February | 11.00 | Group Stage |
| Wednesday, 4 February | 17.00 | Group Stage |
| Thursday, 5 February | 11.00 | Group Stage |
| Thursday, 5 February | 17.00 | Group Stage |
| Friday, 6 February | 10.00 | Quarter-finals |
| Friday, 6 February | 17.00 | Quarter-finals |
| Saturday, 7 February | 10.00 | Semi-finals |
| Saturday, 7 February | 17.00 | Semi-finals |
| Sunday, 8 February | 09.30 | Finals |
| Sunday, 8 February | 18.00 | Finals |
Note: All times are in China Standard Time (UTC+08:00)

== Teams ==
=== Participating members ===
The tournament will feature 12 teams competing in the men's category and 11 teams in the women's category.

| Nation | Men's | Women's | Nation | Men's | Women's |
|---|---|---|---|---|---|
| China | Yes | Yes | South Korea | Yes | Yes |
| Chinese Taipei | Yes | Yes | Macau | Yes | —N/a |
| Hong Kong | Yes | Yes | Malaysia | Yes | Yes |
| India | Yes | Yes | Myanmar | Yes | Yes |
| Indonesia | Yes | Yes | Singapore | Yes | Yes |
| Japan | Yes | Yes | Thailand | Yes | Yes |

== Draw ==
=== Seedings ===
Seeding was determined based on the world team rankings released on January 6, 2025.

- Men's team
1. China
2. Indonesia
3. Chinese Taipei
4. Japan
- Women's team
1. China
2. South Korea
3. Japan
4. Thailand

=== Drawn groups ===
The draw was held on 9 January 2026. Both the men's and women's team group stages consist of 4 groups: A, B, C, and D (men's) and W, X, Y, and Z (women's). All groups consist of 3 teams except for group W (2 teams).

Men's team
| Group A | Group B | Group C | Group D |
|---|---|---|---|
| China (1, H); Thailand; Macau | Chinese Taipei (3); South Korea; Hong Kong | Japan (4); India; Singapore | Indonesia (2); Malaysia; Myanmar |

Women's team
| Group W | Group X | Group Y | Group Z |
|---|---|---|---|
| China (1, H); Malaysia | Japan (3); Indonesia; Hong Kong | Thailand (4); India; Myanmar | South Korea (2); Chinese Taipei; Singapore |

== Medal summary ==
=== Medal tally ===
* Host nation (China)

| Rank | Nation | Gold | Silver | Bronze | Total |
|---|---|---|---|---|---|
| 1 | South Korea | 1 | 0 | 1 | 2 |
| 2 | Japan | 1 | 0 | 0 | 1 |
| 3 | China* | 0 | 2 | 0 | 2 |
| 4 | Indonesia | 0 | 0 | 2 | 2 |
| 5 | Chinese Taipei | 0 | 0 | 1 | 1 |
| Totals (5 entries) | | 2 | 2 | 4 | 8 |

=== Medalists ===
| Event | Gold | Silver | Bronze |
|---|---|---|---|
| Men's team | Japan; Takuro Hoki; Yugo Kobayashi; Kakeru Kumagai; Hiroki Nishi; Kenta Nishimoto; Takumi Nomura; Yudai Okimoto; Yuichi Shimogami; Yushi Tanaka; Koki Watanabe | China; Chen Junting; Dong Tianyao; He Jiting; Hu Keyuan; Hu Zhe'an; Lin Xiangyi; Liu Junrong; Ren Xiangyu; Wang Zhengxing; Zhu Xuanchen | South Korea; Cho Hyeon-woo; Cho Song-hyun; Choi Ji-hoon; Jin Yong; Kang Min-hyuk; Ki Dong-ju; Kim Won-ho; Park Sang-yong; Seo Seung-jae; Yoo Tae-bin |
| Men's team | Japan; Takuro Hoki; Yugo Kobayashi; Kakeru Kumagai; Hiroki Nishi; Kenta Nishimoto; Takumi Nomura; Yudai Okimoto; Yuichi Shimogami; Yushi Tanaka; Koki Watanabe | China; Chen Junting; Dong Tianyao; He Jiting; Hu Keyuan; Hu Zhe'an; Lin Xiangyi; Liu Junrong; Ren Xiangyu; Wang Zhengxing; Zhu Xuanchen | Indonesia; Muhammad Rian Ardianto; Leo Rolly Carnando; Anthony Sinisuka Ginting; Rahmat Hidayat; Raymond Indra; Nikolaus Joaquin; Bagas Maulana; Richie Duta Richardo; Prahdiska Bagas Shujiwo; Zaki Ubaidillah |
| Women's team | South Korea; An Se-young; Baek Ha-na; Kim Ga-eun; Kim Hye-jeong; Kim Min-ji; Kong Hee-yong; Lee Seo-jin; Lee So-hee; Lee Yeon-woo; Park Ga-eun | China; Chen Fanshutian; Gao Fangjie; Han Qianxi; Jia Yifan; Liu Jiayue; Luo Yi; Wang Tingge; Xu Wenjing; Yuan Anqi; Zhang Shuxian | Chinese Taipei; Chang Ching-hui; Chiu Pin-chian; Hsu Wen-chi; Hsu Ya-ching; Hsu Yin-hui; Lin Hsiang-ti; Lin Jhih-yun; Sung Shuo-yun; Sung Yu-hsuan; Yang Ching-tun |
| Women's team | South Korea; An Se-young; Baek Ha-na; Kim Ga-eun; Kim Hye-jeong; Kim Min-ji; Kong Hee-yong; Lee Seo-jin; Lee So-hee; Lee Yeon-woo; Park Ga-eun | China; Chen Fanshutian; Gao Fangjie; Han Qianxi; Jia Yifan; Liu Jiayue; Luo Yi; Wang Tingge; Xu Wenjing; Yuan Anqi; Zhang Shuxian | Indonesia; Febriana Dwipuji Kusuma; Amallia Cahaya Pratiwi; Ni Kadek Dhinda Amartya Pratiwi; Meilysa Trias Puspita Sari; Mutiara Ayu Puspitasari; Siti Fadia Silva Ramadhanti; Rachel Allessya Rose; Febi Setianingrum; Ester Nurumi Tri Wardoyo; Thalita Ramadhani Wiryawan |
