= Jin Yong (badminton) =

South Korean badminton player (born 2003)

Personal information
- Born: 8 April 2003 (age 23) Dangjin, South Chungcheong, South Korea
- Height: 170 cm (5 ft 7 in)

Sport
- Country: South Korea
- Sport: Badminton
- Handedness: Left

Men's doubles
- Highest ranking: 28 (with Na Sung-seung, 28 May 2024)
- Current ranking: 60 (with Na Sung-seung, 16 June 2026)
- BWF profile
Medal record
Men's badminton
Representing South Korea
Asian Games
Bronze medal – third place	2022 Hangzhou	Men's team
Asia Mixed Team Championships
Silver medal – second place	2023 Dubai	Mixed team
Asia Team Championships
Bronze medal – third place	2022 Selangor	Men's team
Bronze medal – third place	2024 Selangor	Men's team
Bronze medal – third place	2026 Qingdao	Men's team
World University Games
Gold medal – first place	2025 Rhine-Ruhr	Men's doubles
Bronze medal – third place	2021 Chengdu	Mixed doubles
Bronze medal – third place	2025 Rhine-Ruhr	Mixed team
Asian Junior Championships
Bronze medal – third place	2019 Suzhou	Mixed team

Jin Yong (Korean: 진용; born 8 April 2003) is a South Korean badminton player. He won his first senior international title at the Denmark Masters with Na Sung-seung.

== Background ==
Jin began playing badminton in second grade at Dangjin Elementary School under the influence of his mother, Lee Mi-kyung, who is a former badminton player. In August 2021, as a third-year student at Dangjin Information High School, he won the men's doubles event at the national selection tournament and joined the national team. In 2022, he joined the Yonex Korea team.

== Achievements ==
=== World University Games ===
Men's doubles
Year	Venue	Partner	Opponent	Score	Result
2025	Westenergie Sporthalle; Mülheim, Germany	(South Korea) Lee Jong-min	(China) Cui Hechen (China) Peng Jianqin	15–10, 15–10	Gold

Mixed doubles
Year	Venue	Partner	Opponent	Score	Result
2021	Shuangliu Sports Centre Gymnasium; Chengdu, China	(South Korea) Ji Young-bin	(Chinese Taipei) Lee Fang-chih (Chinese Taipei) Teng Chun-hsun	13–21, 25–27	Bronze

=== BWF World Tour (6 titles, 3 runners-up) ===
The BWF World Tour, which was announced on 19 March 2017 and implemented in 2018, is a series of elite badminton tournaments sanctioned by the Badminton World Federation (BWF). The BWF World Tours are divided into levels of World Tour Finals, Super 1000, Super 750, Super 500, Super 300, and the BWF Tour Super 100.

Men's doubles
Year	Tournament	Level	Partner	Opponent	Score	Result
2024	Malaysia Masters	Super 500	(South Korea) Na Sung-seung	(Denmark) Kim Astrup (Denmark) Anders Skaarup Rasmussen	18–21, 14–21	(silver) Runner-up
2024	Korea Masters	Super 300	(South Korea) Kim Won-ho	(Malaysia) Aaron Chia (Malaysia) Soh Wooi Yik	23–21, 19–21, 14–21	(silver) Runner-up
2024	China Masters	Super 750	(South Korea) Seo Seung-jae	(Indonesia) Sabar Karyaman Gutama (Indonesia) Muhammad Reza Pahlevi Isfahani	21–16, 21–16	(gold) Winner
2025	Thailand Masters	Super 300	(South Korea) Seo Seung-jae	(Indonesia) Muhammad Shohibul Fikri (Indonesia) Daniel Marthin	21–18, 21–17	(gold) Winner
2025	Vietnam Open	Super 100	(South Korea) Na Sung-seung	(China) Chen Xujun (China) Guo Ruohan	21–10, 21–14	(gold) Winner
2025 (I)	Indonesia Masters	Super 100	(South Korea) Na Sung-seung	(Japan) Kakeru Kumagai (Japan) Hiroki Nishi	21–19, 13–21, 21–13	(gold) Winner
2026	Macau Open	Super 300	(South Korea) Lee Jong-min	(Indonesia) Ali Faathir Rayhan (Indonesia) Devin Artha Wahyudi	18–21, 21–19, 21–10	(gold) Winner
2026	Malaysia Super 100	Super 100	(South Korea) Jo Song-hyun	(South Korea) Na Sung-seung (South Korea) Wang Chan	21–17, 21–18	(gold) Winner
2026 (II)	Indonesia Masters	Super 100	(South Korea) Jo Song-hyun	(Indonesia) Muhammad Rian Ardianto (Indonesia) Daniel Edgar Marvino	19–21, 12–21	(silver) Runner-up

=== BWF International Challenge/Series (2 titles, 1 runner-up) ===
Men's doubles
Year	Tournament	Partner	Opponent	Score	Result
2022	Denmark Masters	(South Korea) Na Sung-seung	(Chinese Taipei) Chiu Hsiang-chieh (Chinese Taipei) Yang Ming-tse	21–13, 21–16	(gold) Winner
2023	Vietnam International	(South Korea) Na Sung-seung	(Indonesia) Alfian Eko Prasetya (Indonesia) Ade Yusuf Santoso	21–8, 21–6	(gold) Winner
2023	Northern Marianas Open	(South Korea) Na Sung-seung	(Chinese Taipei) Wei Chun-wei (Chinese Taipei) Wu Guan-xun	11–21, 21–15, 18–21	(silver) Runner-up

BWF International Challenge tournament
BWF Future Series tournament
