= Badminton Asia Team Championships =

Badminton Championships

The Badminton Asia Team Championships is a biennial tournament organized by Badminton Asia to crown the best men's and women's national badminton teams in Asia.

It started as a standalone event for both men's and women's teams since 2016 and both the team events are conducted simultaneously by Badminton Asia Confederation.

== History ==
Asian team championships exclusively for Men's team were conducted together with Asian Badminton Championships until 1993 after which the team tournament stopped altogether, only to be commenced 23 years later in 2016 including Women's team event, which also serves as qualification tournament for the Thomas and Uber Cups Finals.

== Editions ==
| Year | Host | Ref |
|---|---|---|
| 2016 | Hyderabad, India | |
| 2018 | Alor Setar, Malaysia | |
| 2020 | Manila, Philippines | |
| 2022 | Shah Alam, Malaysia | |
| 2024 | Shah Alam, Malaysia | |
| 2026 | Qingdao, China | |

=== Locations ===
Host cities of Badminton Asia Team Championship

== List of medalists ==
=== Men's team ===
| Year | Host city | Host country | Gold | Score | Silver | Bronze | |
|---|---|---|---|---|---|---|---|
| 2016 | Hyderabad | India | Indonesia | 3–2 | Japan | South Korea | India (H) |
| 2018 | Alor Setar | Malaysia | Indonesia | 3–1 | China | Malaysia (H) | South Korea |
| 2020 | Manila | Philippines | Indonesia | 3–1 | Malaysia | India | Japan |
| 2022 | Shah Alam | Malaysia | Malaysia (H) | 3–0 | Indonesia | South Korea | Singapore |
| 2024 | Shah Alam | Malaysia | China | 3–0 | Malaysia (H) | Japan | South Korea |
| 2026 | Qingdao | China | Japan | 3–0 | China (H) | Indonesia | South Korea |

(H) = Host

=== Women's team ===
| Year | Host city | Host country | Gold | Score | Silver | Bronze | |
|---|---|---|---|---|---|---|---|
| 2016 | Hyderabad | India | China | 3–2 | Japan | South Korea | Thailand |
| 2018 | Alor Setar | Malaysia | Japan | 3–0 | China | Indonesia | South Korea |
| 2020 | Manila | Philippines | Japan | 3–0 | South Korea | Malaysia | Thailand |
| 2022 | Shah Alam | Malaysia | Indonesia | 3–1 | South Korea | Japan | Malaysia (H) |
| 2024 | Shah Alam | Malaysia | India | 3–2 | Thailand | Indonesia | Japan |
| 2026 | Qingdao | China | South Korea | 3–0 | China (H) | Indonesia | Chinese Taipei |

(H) = Host

== Medal table ==
=== Men's team ===
| Rank | NOC | Gold | Silver | Bronze | Total |
|---|---|---|---|---|---|
| 1 | Indonesia | 3 | 1 | 1 | 5 |
| 2 | Malaysia | 1 | 2 | 1 | 4 |
| 3 | China | 1 | 2 | 0 | 3 |
| 4 | Japan | 1 | 1 | 2 | 4 |
| 5 | South Korea | 0 | 0 | 5 | 5 |
| 6 | India | 0 | 0 | 2 | 2 |
| 7 | Singapore | 0 | 0 | 1 | 1 |
| Totals (7 entries) | | 6 | 6 | 12 | 24 |

=== Women's team ===
| Rank | NOC | Gold | Silver | Bronze | Total |
|---|---|---|---|---|---|
| 1 | Japan | 2 | 1 | 2 | 5 |
| 2 | South Korea | 1 | 2 | 2 | 5 |
| 3 | China | 1 | 2 | 0 | 3 |
| 4 | Indonesia | 1 | 0 | 3 | 4 |
| 5 | India | 1 | 0 | 0 | 1 |
| 6 | Thailand | 0 | 1 | 2 | 3 |
| 7 | Malaysia | 0 | 0 | 2 | 2 |
| 8 | Chinese Taipei | 0 | 0 | 1 | 1 |
| Totals (8 entries) | | 6 | 6 | 12 | 24 |

=== Overall (men's and women's team) ===
| Rank | NOC | Gold | Silver | Bronze | Total |
|---|---|---|---|---|---|
| 1 | Indonesia | 4 | 1 | 4 | 9 |
| 2 | Japan | 3 | 2 | 4 | 9 |
| 3 | China | 2 | 4 | 0 | 6 |
| 4 | South Korea | 1 | 2 | 7 | 10 |
| 5 | Malaysia | 1 | 2 | 3 | 6 |
| 6 | India | 1 | 0 | 2 | 3 |
| 7 | Thailand | 0 | 1 | 2 | 3 |
| 8 | Chinese Taipei | 0 | 0 | 1 | 1 |
| 8 | Singapore | 0 | 0 | 1 | 1 |
| Totals (9 entries) | | 12 | 12 | 24 | 48 |
