= 2025 Swiss Open (badminton) =

Badminton tournament in Switzerland

Tournament details
- Dates: 18–23 March
- Edition: 62nd
- Level: Super 300
- Total prize money: US$250,000
- Venue: St. Jakobshalle
- Location: Basel, Switzerland

Champions
- Men's singles: (China) Weng Hongyang
- Women's singles: (China) Chen Yufei
- Men's doubles: (Thailand) Kittinupong Kedren (Thailand) Dechapol Puavaranukroh
- Women's doubles: (China) Jia Yifan (China) Zhang Shuxian
- Mixed doubles: (China) Feng Yanzhe (China) Wei Yaxin

The 2025 Swiss Open (officially known as the Yonex Swiss Open 2025 for sponsorship reasons) was a badminton tournament that took place at the St. Jakobshalle, Basel, Switzerland, from 18 to 23 March 2025 and had a total prize of US$250,000.

== Tournament ==
The 2025 Swiss Open was the ninth tournament of the 2025 BWF World Tour and was part of the Swiss Open championships, which have been held since 1955. This tournament is organized by the Yonex Swiss Open with sanction from the BWF.

=== Venue ===
This tournament was held at the St. Jakobshalle in Basel, Switzerland.

=== Point distribution ===
Below is the point distribution table for each phase of the tournament based on the BWF points system for the BWF World Tour Super 300 event.

Winner	Runner-up	3/4	5/8	9/16	17/32	33/64	65/128
7,000	5,950	4,900	3,850	2,750	1,670	660	320

=== Prize pool ===
The total prize money is US$250,000 with the distribution of the prize money in accordance with BWF regulations.

Event	Winner	Finalist	Semi-finals	Quarter-finals	Last 16
Singles	$18,750	$9,500	$3,625	$1,500	$875
Doubles	$19,750	$9,500	$3,500	$1,812	$937

== Men's singles ==
=== Seeds ===
1. (China) Shi Yuqi (withdrew)
2. (Denmark) Anders Antonsen (second round)
3. (Thailand) Kunlavut Vitidsarn (quarter-finals)
4. (China) Li Shifeng (semi-finals)
5. (Malaysia) Lee Zii Jia (withdrew)
6. (Chinese Taipei) Chou Tien-chen (first round)
7. (Chinese Taipei) Lin Chun-yi (semi-finals)
8. (China) Weng Hongyang (champion)

=== Finals ===
Semi-finals
7	(Chinese Taipei) Lin Chun-yi	21	16
8	(China) Weng Hongyang	23	21
4	(China) Li Shifeng	19	14
(France) Christo Popov	21	21

Final
8	(China) Weng Hongyang	21	21
(France) Christo Popov	18	3

=== Top half ===
==== Section 1 ====
First round
3	(Thailand) K Vitidsarn	21	21
(Chinese Taipei) Lee C-h	15	16
(India) K George	21	17	10
(Denmark) R Gemke	18	21	21
7	(Chinese Taipei) Lin C-y	22	21
(Chinese Taipei) Chi Y-j	20	14
(Chinese Taipei) Su L-y	21	10	21
(China) Lu GZ	12	21	14

Second round
3	(Thailand) K Vitidsarn	21	20	21
(Denmark) R Gemke	10	22	13
7	(Chinese Taipei) Lin C-y	21	21
(Chinese Taipei) Su L-y	17	11

Quarter-finals
3	(Thailand) K Vitidsarn	16	15
7	(Chinese Taipei) Lin C-y	21	21

==== Section 2 ====
First round
8	(China) Weng HY	21	0
(Chinese Taipei) Wang T-w	10	0^{r}
PFQ	(Hong Kong) J Gunawan	21	15	19
PFQ	(Japan) R Hatano	17	21	21
SWM	(Japan) K Nishimoto	21	21
Q1	(India) A Shetty	15	19
PFQ	(Japan) K Takahashi	19	20
(Malaysia) Leong J H	21	22

Second round
8	(China) Weng HY	21	21
PFQ	(Japan) R Hatano	9	19
SWM	(Japan) K Nishimoto	21	20	22
(Malaysia) Leong J H	17	22	20

Quarter-finals
8	(China) Weng HY	21	21
SWM	(Japan) K Nishimoto	10	16

=== Bottom half ===
==== Section 3 ====
First round
(India) P Rajawat	21	21
WC	(Switzerland) T Künzi	10	11
(Hong Kong) Ng K L	18	16
SWM	(France) T J Popov	21	21
PFQ	(India) S Kidambi	23	23
(India) Prannoy H. S.	21	21
(Thailand) K Wangcharoen	13	10
4	(China) Li SF	21	21

Second round
(India) P Rajawat	15	17
SWM	(France) T J Popov	21	21
PFQ	(India) S Kidambi	15	11
4	(China) Li SF	21	21

Quarter-finals
SWM	(France) T J Popov	15	18
4	(China) Li SF	21	21

==== Section 4 ====
First round
(Japan) Y Tanaka	21	21
Q4	(Malaysia) J Hoh	7	13
(France) C Popov	21	21	21
6	(Chinese Taipei) Chou T-c	23	19	14
Q2	(Denmark) M Johannesen	5	16
Q3	(India) S Subramanian	21	21
(China) Lei LX	21	13	12
2	(Denmark) A Antonsen	18	21	21

Second round
(Japan) Y Tanaka	17	21	21
(France) C Popov	21	15	23
Q3	(India) S Subramanian	18	21	21
2	(Denmark) A Antonsen	21	12	5

Quarter-finals
(France) C Popov	21	21
Q3	(India) S Subramanian	10	14

== Women's singles ==
=== Seeds ===
1. (Thailand) Pornpawee Chochuwong (quarter-finals)
2. (Thailand) Supanida Katethong (quarter-finals)
3. (Thailand) Ratchanok Intanon (withdrew)
4. (Indonesia) Putri Kusuma Wardani (semi-finals)
5. (China) Chen Yufei (champion)
6. (United States) Beiwen Zhang (first round)
7. (India) P. V. Sindhu (first round)
8. (Chinese Taipei) Sung Shuo-yun (withdrew)

=== Finals ===
Semi-finals
SWM	(Denmark) Line Kjærsfeldt	21	12	21
SWM	(Canada) Michelle Li	14	21	17
4	(Indonesia) Putri Kusuma Wardani	15	14
5	(China) Chen Yufei	21	21

Final
SWM	(Denmark) Line Kjærsfeldt	17	17
5	(China) Chen Yufei	21	21

=== Top half ===
==== Section 1 ====
First round
1	(Thailand) P Chochuwong	21	21
Q4	(Chinese Taipei) Chen S-y	12	12
(China) Wu LY	21	22
WC	(Switzerland) M Schnider	14	20
SWM	(Denmark) L Kjærsfeldt	21	21
(Chinese Taipei) Lin H-t	14	18
PFQ	(China) Dai W	18	22	21
(Vietnam) Nguyễn T L	21	20	15

Second round
1	(Thailand) P Chochuwong	21	21
(China) Wu LY	11	15
SWM	(Denmark) L Kjærsfeldt	21	15	21
PFQ	(China) Dai W	14	21	19

Quarter-finals
1	(Thailand) P Chochuwong	18	19
SWM	(Denmark) L Kjærsfeldt	21	21

==== Section 2 ====
First round
7	(India) P. V. Sindhu	17	19
(Denmark) J D Jakobsen	21	21
(Thailand) P Choeikeewong	21	12	15
(Ukraine) P Buhrova	17	21	21
SWM	(Canada) M Li	20	21	21
(India) M Bansod	22	14	19
PFQ	(Chinese Taipei) Huang Y-h	13	17
(Chinese Taipei) Tung C-t	21	21

Second round
(Denmark) J D Jakobsen	21	21
(Ukraine) P Buhrova	9	19
SWM	(Canada) M Li	21	20	21
(Chinese Taipei) Tung C-t	18	22	13

Quarter-finals
(Denmark) J D Jakobsen	21	13	17
SWM	(Canada) M Li	18	21	21

=== Bottom half ===
==== Section 3 ====
First round
Q2	(India) I Baruah	18	21	22
(India) A Kashyap	21	17	20
Q1	(China) Han QX	10	21	21
6	(United States) BW Zhang	21	19	14
PFQ	(India) A Kharb	14	13
(India) A Upadhyaya	21	21
(Chinese Taipei) Chiu P-c	17	18
4	(Indonesia) P K Wardani	21	21

Second round
Q2	(India) I Baruah	19	21	18
Q1	(China) Han QX	21	18	21
(India) A Upadhyaya	17	19
4	(Indonesia) P K Wardani	21	21

Quarter-finals
Q1	(China) Han QX	7	12
4	(Indonesia) P K Wardani	21	21

==== Section 4 ====
First round
(Denmark) L Christophersen	21	21
(India) R Ramraj	11	17
(Scotland) K Gilmour	19	9
5	(China) Chen YF	21	21
(Chinese Taipei) Pai Y-p	18	12
(Malaysia) Goh J W	21	21
Q3	(Bulgaria) K Nalbantova	21	11	18
2	(Thailand) S Katethong	19	21	21

Second round
(Denmark) L Christophersen	21	11	13
5	(China) Chen YF	18	21	21
(Malaysia) Goh J W	9	21	22
2	(Thailand) S Katethong	21	18	24

Quarter-finals
5	(China) Chen YF	w	/	o
2	(Thailand) S Katethong

== Men's doubles ==
=== Seeds ===
1. (Malaysia) Goh Sze Fei / Nur Izzuddin (first round)
2. (Indonesia) Sabar Karyaman Gutama / Muhammad Reza Pahlevi Isfahani (quarter-finals)
3. (Chinese Taipei) Lee Jhe-huei / Yang Po-hsuan (quarter-finals)
4. (England) Ben Lane / Sean Vendy (quarter-finals)
5. (China) Liu Yi / Wang Chang (quarter-finals)
6. (Thailand) Kittinupong Kedren / Dechapol Puavaranukroh (champions)
7. (China) Huang Di / Liang Weikeng (withdrew)
8. (Denmark) Rasmus Kjær / Frederik Søgaard (withdrew)

=== Finals ===
Semi-finals
(Japan) Hiroki Midorikawa (Japan) Kyohei Yamashita	16	14
6	(Thailand) Kittinupong Kedren (Thailand) Dechapol Puavaranukroh	21	21
SWM	(Indonesia) Muhammad Shohibul Fikri (Indonesia) Daniel Marthin	21	26
(Chinese Taipei) Lee Fang-chih (Chinese Taipei) Lee Fang-jen	17	24

Final
6	(Thailand) Kittinupong Kedren (Thailand) Dechapol Puavaranukroh	21	18	21
SWM	(Indonesia) Muhammad Shohibul Fikri (Indonesia) Daniel Marthin	15	21	14

=== Top half ===
==== Section 1 ====
First round
1	(Malaysia) Goh S F (Malaysia) N Izzuddin	23	21	11
(Japan) H Midorikawa (Japan) K Yamashita	25	15	21
Q2	(Chinese Taipei) Chen C-k (Chinese Taipei) Lin B-w	19	21	18
(Chinese Taipei) Chiu H-c (Chinese Taipei) Wang C-l	21	18	21
5	(China) Liu Yi (China) Wang C	21	21
(Chinese Taipei) Chang K-c (Chinese Taipei) Po L-w	13	10
(Chinese Taipei) Liu K-h (Chinese Taipei) Yang P-ha	21	21
PFQ	(Germany) B Geiss (Germany) J C Völker	16	18

Second round
(Japan) H Midorikawa (Japan) K Yamashita	21	11	21
(Chinese Taipei) Chiu H-c (Chinese Taipei) Wang C-l	19	21	14
5	(China) Liu Yi (China) Wang C	18	21	21
(Chinese Taipei) Liu K-h (Chinese Taipei) Yang P-ha	21	16	18

Quarter-finals
(Japan) H Midorikawa (Japan) K Yamashita	21	21	21
5	(China) Liu Yi (China) Wang C	23	16	15

==== Section 2 ====
First round
4	(England) B Lane (England) S Vendy	21	21
Q3	(France) J Maio (France) W Villeger	18	14
(China) Liu Y (China) Zeng WH	21	21
WC	(Switzerland) N Franconville (Switzerland) M Q Pham	12	10
6	(Thailand) K Kedren (Thailand) D Puavaranukroh	21	22
(Denmark) W K Boe (Denmark) C F Kjær	19	20
(Thailand) P Sukphun (Thailand) P Teeraratsakul	21	21	20
(France) C Popov (France) T J Popov	17	23	22

Second round
4	(England) B Lane (England) S Vendy	21	21
(China) Liu Y (China) Zeng WH	19	19
6	(Thailand) K Kedren (Thailand) D Puavaranukroh	21	21
(France) C Popov (France) T J Popov	18	17

Quarter-finals
4	(England) B Lane (England) S Vendy	18	22	18
6	(Thailand) K Kedren (Thailand) D Puavaranukroh	21	20	21

=== Bottom half ===
==== Section 3 ====
First round
(Malaysia) N M Azriyn A (Malaysia) Tan W K	21	18
(Denmark) A Søndergaard (Denmark) J Toft	23	21
(China) Chen BY (China) Xie HN	12	21	15
SWM	(Indonesia) M S Fikri (Indonesia) D Marthin	21	19	21
(Denmark) D Lundgaard (Denmark) M Vestergaard	21	21	13
(Chinese Taipei) Chen Z-r (Chinese Taipei) Lin Y-c	23	17	21
(Malaysia) Ong Y S (Malaysia) Teo E Y	18	26
3	(Chinese Taipei) Lee J-h (Chinese Taipei) Yang P-hs	21	28

Second round
(Denmark) A Søndergaard (Denmark) J Toft	15	22	19
SWM	(Indonesia) M S Fikri (Indonesia) D Marthin	21	20	21
(Chinese Taipei) Chen Z-r (Chinese Taipei) Lin Y-c	9	14
3	(Chinese Taipei) Lee J-h (Chinese Taipei) Yang P-hs	21	21

Quarter-finals
SWM	(Indonesia) M S Fikri (Indonesia) D Marthin	21	21
3	(Chinese Taipei) Lee J-h (Chinese Taipei) Yang P-hs	19	17

==== Section 4 ====
First round
(Scotland) C Grimley (Scotland) M Grimley	16	21	11
(Chinese Taipei) Lee F-c (Chinese Taipei) Lee F-j	21	19	21
Q4	(Germany) D Eckerlin (Germany) S Krax	11^{r}
SWM	(Indonesia) L R Carnando (Indonesia) B Maulana	16
PFQ	(England) C Hemming (England) E van Leeuwen	21	19	21
(Chinese Taipei) Chiang C-w (Chinese Taipei) Wu H-y	16	21	16
Q1	(Republic of Ireland) D Bennett (Republic of Ireland) R Kong	6	11
2	(Indonesia) S K Gutama (Indonesia) M R P Isfahani	21	21

Second round
(Chinese Taipei) Lee F-c (Chinese Taipei) Lee F-j	21	23
SWM	(Indonesia) L R Carnando (Indonesia) B Maulana	19	21
PFQ	(England) C Hemming (England) E van Leeuwen	18	21	13
2	(Indonesia) S K Gutama (Indonesia) M R P Isfahani	21	16	21

Quarter-finals
(Chinese Taipei) Lee F-c (Chinese Taipei) Lee F-j	21	14	21
2	(Indonesia) S K Gutama (Indonesia) M R P Isfahani	19	21	13

== Women's doubles ==
=== Seeds ===
1. (China) Liu Shengshu / Tan Ning (final)
2. (China) Li Yijing / Luo Xumin (first round)
3. (Indonesia) Febriana Dwipuji Kusuma / Amallia Cahaya Pratiwi (semi-finals)
4. (India) Treesa Jolly / Gayatri Gopichand (semi-finals)
5. (China) Jia Yifan / Zhang Shuxian (champions)
6. (Indonesia) Apriyani Rahayu / Siti Fadia Silva Ramadhanti (withdrew)
7. (Thailand) Laksika Kanlaha / Phataimas Muenwong (quarter-finals)
8. (Hong Kong) Yeung Nga Ting / Yeung Pui Lam (quarter-finals)

=== Finals ===
Semi-finals
1	(China) Liu Shengshu (China) Tan Ning	15	21	21
4	(India) Treesa Jolly (India) Gayatri Gopichand	21	15	12
3	(Indonesia) Febriana Dwipuji Kusuma (Indonesia) Amalia Cahaya Pratiwi	11	12
5	(China) Jia Yifan (China) Zhang Shuxian	21	21

Final
1	(China) Liu Shengshu (China) Tan Ning	19	21	17
5	(China) Jia Yifan (China) Zhang Shuxian	21	14	21

=== Top half ===
==== Section 1 ====
First round
(Thailand) B Aimsaard (Thailand) N Aimsaard	21	21
(Ukraine) P Buhrova (Ukraine) Y Kantemyr	10	12
SWM	(Chinese Taipei) Hsieh P-s (Chinese Taipei) Hung E-t	w	/	o
(Chinese Taipei) Sung S-y (Chinese Taipei) Yu C-h
(Switzerland) L Amiguet (Switzerland) C Racloz	21	9	16
(Chinese Taipei) Chang C-h (Chinese Taipei) Yang C-t	18	21	21

Second round
1	(China) Liu SS (China) Tan N	21	21
(Thailand) B Aimsaard (Thailand) N Aimsaard	13	10
SWM	(Chinese Taipei) Hsieh P-s (Chinese Taipei) Hung E-t	21	21
(Chinese Taipei) Chang C-h (Chinese Taipei) Yang C-t	18	8

Quarter-finals
1	(China) Liu SS (China) Tan N	21	21
SWM	(Chinese Taipei) Hsieh P-s (Chinese Taipei) Hung E-t	14	10

==== Section 2 ====
First round
4	(India) T Jolly (India) G Gopichand	21	21
(Switzerland) A Müller (Netherlands) K van Buiten	16	17
(Germany) S Hübsch (Germany) A Lehmann	21	21
(Austria) S Dlapka (Austria) L Rumpold	15	14
8	(Hong Kong) Yeung N T (Hong Kong) Yeung P L	21	21
(Chinese Taipei) Chen S-y (Chinese Taipei) Hsieh Y-e	16	18
(Chinese Taipei) Chiu P-c (Chinese Taipei) Tung C-t	21	21
(Bulgaria) M Chepisheva (Bulgaria) T Popivanova	5	6

Second round
4	(India) T Jolly (India) G Gopichand	21	21
(Germany) S Hübsch (Germany) A Lehmann	12	8
8	(Hong Kong) Yeung N T (Hong Kong) Yeung P L	21	21
(Chinese Taipei) Chiu P-c (Chinese Taipei) Tung C-t	14	10

Quarter-finals
4	(India) T Jolly (India) G Gopichand	21	21
8	(Hong Kong) Yeung N T (Hong Kong) Yeung P L	18	14

=== Bottom half ===
==== Section 3 ====
First round
(Switzerland) C Brand (Switzerland) J Franconville	12	13
7	(Thailand) L Kanlaha (Thailand) P Muenwong	21	21
(France) L Schaffner (Ukraine) M Stoliarenko	7	14
(Chinese Taipei) Hsu Y-h (Chinese Taipei) Lin J-y	21	21
(France) A Cuevas (France) K Desmots-Chacun	9	13
3	(Indonesia) F D Kusuma (Indonesia) A C Pratiwi	21	21

Second round
(Chinese Taipei) Hung H-e (Chinese Taipei) Lee C-c	18	11
7	(Thailand) L Kanlaha (Thailand) P Muenwong	21	21
(Chinese Taipei) Hsu Y-h (Chinese Taipei) Lin J-y	21	11	13
3	(Indonesia) F D Kusuma (Indonesia) A C Pratiwi	17	21	21

Quarter-finals
7	(Thailand) L Kanlaha (Thailand) P Muenwong	13	15
3	(Indonesia) F D Kusuma (Indonesia) A C Pratiwi	21	21

==== Section 4 ====
First round
(India) P Konjengbam (India) S Mishra	11	19
(Turkey) B Erçetin (Turkey) N İnci	21	21
(Denmark) N P Anthonisen (Denmark) M Fruergaard	18	16
5	(China) Jia YF (China) Zhang SX	21	21
(India) A S Sunil (India) V Viswanath Sri	13	13
(Netherlands) D Jille (Denmark) S Thygesen	21	21
(Chinese Taipei) Hu L-f (Chinese Taipei) Jheng Y-c	22	22	21
2	(China) Li YJ (China) Luo XM	24	20	17

Second round
(Turkey) B Erçetin (Turkey) N İnci	16	10
5	(China) Jia YF (China) Zhang SX	21	21
(Netherlands) D Jille (Denmark) S Thygesen	16	16
(Chinese Taipei) Hu L-f (Chinese Taipei) Jheng Y-c	21	21

Quarter-finals
5	(China) Jia YF (China) Zhang SX	21	21
(Chinese Taipei) Hu L-f (Chinese Taipei) Jheng Y-c	18	11

== Mixed doubles ==
=== Seeds ===
1. (Malaysia) Goh Soon Huat / Shevon Jemie Lai (quarter-finals)
2. (Chinese Taipei) Yang Po-hsuan / Hu Ling-fang (first round)
3. (China) Guo Xinwa / Chen Fanghui (second round)
4. (France) Thom Gicquel / Delphine Delrue (quarter-finals)
5. (China) Jiang Zhenbang / Huang Dongping (second round)
6. (China) Feng Yanzhe / Wei Yaxin (champions)
7. (Denmark) Jesper Toft / Amalie Magelund (first round)
8. (Thailand) Dechapol Puavaranukroh / Supissara Paewsampran (semi-finals)

=== Finals ===
Semi-finals
8	(Thailand) Dechapol Puavaranukroh (Thailand) Supissara Paewsampran	8	16
5	(China) Feng Yanzhe (China) Wei Yaxin	21	21
(China) Zhu Yijun (China) Zhang Chi	23	22
(Chinese Taipei) Liu Kuang-heng (Chinese Taipei) Jheng Yu-chieh	21	20

Final
5	(China) Feng Yanzhe (China) Wei Yaxin	21	21
(China) Zhu Yijun (China) Zhang Chi	13	15

=== Top half ===
==== Section 1 ====
First round
1	(Malaysia) Goh S H (Malaysia) S J Lai	21	21
Q2	(Chinese Taipei) Chen Z-r (Chinese Taipei) Yang C-t	8	18
Q4	(France) T Gardon (France) K Desmots-Chacun	12	11
(Thailand) R Oupthong (Thailand) J Sudjaipraparat	21	21
8	(Thailand) D Puavaranukroh (Thailand) S Paewsampran	21	21
(Indonesia) D Ferdinansyah (Indonesia) S F S Ramadhanti	9	7
(Ukraine) O Titov (Ukraine) Y Kantemyr	21	21
(United States) L Wang (United States) E Wang	10	6

Second round
1	(Malaysia) Goh S H (Malaysia) S J Lai	20	25	21
(Thailand) R Oupthong (Thailand) J Sudjaipraparat	22	23	11
8	(Thailand) D Puavaranukroh (Thailand) S Paewsampran	21	21
(Ukraine) O Titov (Ukraine) Y Kantemyr	6	5

Quarter-finals
1	(Malaysia) Goh S H (Malaysia) S J Lai	18	10
8	(Thailand) D Puavaranukroh (Thailand) S Paewsampran	21	21

==== Section 2 ====
First round
4	(France) T Gicquel (France) D Delrue	25	21
PFQ	(Chinese Taipei) Po L-w (Chinese Taipei) Chang C-h	23	13
(Malaysia) Wong T C (Malaysia) Lim C S	21	21
Q1	(Macau) Leong I C (Macau) Ng W C	14	10
5	(China) Feng YZ (China) Wei YX	21	21
PFQ	(Germany) J C Völker (Germany) F Volkmann	6	10
(Chinese Taipei) Chen C-k (Chinese Taipei) Hsu Y-h	22	21
(Chinese Taipei) Lin B-w (Chinese Taipei) Lee C-c	20	16

Second round
4	(France) T Gicquel (France) D Delrue	21	21
(Malaysia) Wong T C (Malaysia) Lim C S	16	10
5	(China) Feng YZ (China) Wei YX	21	21
(Chinese Taipei) Chen C-k (Chinese Taipei) Hsu Y-h	9	9

Quarter-finals
4	(France) T Gicquel (France) D Delrue	18	16
5	(China) Feng YZ (China) Wei YX	21	21

=== Bottom half ===
==== Section 3 ====
First round
Q3	(India) A Agarwal (India) S Mishra	18	9
(Thailand) P Teeraratsakul (Thailand) P Muenwong	21	21
(England) C Hemming (England) Es van Leeuwen	12	17
5	(China) Jiang ZB (China) Huang DP	21	21
(India) A Surya (India) A Pramuthesh	10	9
(China) Zhu YJ (China) Zhang C	21	21
(Chinese Taipei) Ye H-w (Chinese Taipei) N G Chan	17	15
3	(China) Guo XW (China) Chen FH	21	21

Second round
(Thailand) P Teeraratsakul (Thailand) P Muenwong	21	21
5	(China) Jiang ZB (China) Huang DP	16	19
(China) Zhu YJ (China) Zhang C	22	21
3	(China) Guo XW (China) Chen FH	20	14

Quarter-finals
(Thailand) P Teeraratsakul (Thailand) P Muenwong	19	11
(China) Zhu YJ (China) Zhang C	21	21

==== Section 4 ====
First round
(India) S Karunakaran (India) A Variyath	21	22
(Algeria) K Mammeri (Algeria) T Mammeri	15	20
(Chinese Taipei) Liu K-h (Chinese Taipei) Jheng Y-c	24	19	21
7	(Denmark) J Toft (Denmark) A Magelund	22	21	15
(Netherlands) R Tabeling (Denmark) A Bøje	17	21	21
(France) J Maio (France) L Palermo	21	13	16
(Denmark) M Vestergaard (Denmark) C Busch	21	13	21
2	(Chinese Taipei) Yang P-hs (Chinese Taipei) Hu L-f	13	21	19

Second round
(India) S Karunakaran (India) A Variyath	14	16
(Chinese Taipei) Liu K-h (Chinese Taipei) Jheng Y-c	21	21
(Netherlands) R Tabeling (Denmark) A Bøje	21	23	21
(Denmark) M Vestergaard (Denmark) C Busch	18	25	23

Quarter-finals
(Chinese Taipei) Liu K-h (Chinese Taipei) Jheng Y-c	21	21
(Denmark) M Vestergaard (Denmark) C Busch	18	18

Preceded by 2025 All England Open; 2025 Ruichang China Masters	BWF World Tour; 2025 BWF season	Succeeded by 2025 Taipei Open
