= 2024 Korea Open (badminton) =

Badminton tournament in Korea

Tournament details
- Dates: 27 August–1 September
- Edition: 31st
- Level: Super 500
- Total prize money: US$420,000
- Venue: Mokpo Indoor Stadium
- Location: Mokpo, South Korea

Champions
- Men's singles: (China) Lu Guangzu
- Women's singles: (South Korea) Kim Ga-eun
- Men's doubles: (Indonesia) Leo Rolly Carnando (Indonesia) Bagas Maulana
- Women's doubles: (South Korea) Jeong Na-eun (South Korea) Kim Hye-jeong
- Mixed doubles: (Malaysia) Chen Tang Jie (Malaysia) Toh Ee Wei

The 2024 Korea Open was a badminton tournament which took place at Mokpo Indoor Stadium in Mokpo, South Korea, from 27 August to 1 September 2024. The tournament had a total prize pool of $420,000.

== Tournament ==
The 2024 Korea Open was the twenty-second tournament of the 2024 BWF World Tour and was part of the Korea Open championships, which had been held since 1991. This tournament was organized by the Badminton Korea Association with sanction from the BWF.

=== Venue ===
This international tournament was held at Mokpo Indoor Stadium in Mokpo, South Korea.

=== Point distribution ===
Below is the point distribution table for each phase of the tournament based on the BWF points system for the BWF World Tour Super 500 event.

Winner	Runner-up	3/4	5/8	9/16	17/32	33/64	65/128
9,200	7,800	6,420	5,040	3,600	2,220	880	430

=== Prize pool ===
The total prize money was US$420,000 with the distribution of the prize money in accordance with BWF regulations.

Event	Winner	Finalist	Semi-finals	Quarter-finals	Last 16
Singles	$31,500	$15,960	$6,090	$2,520	$1,470
Doubles	$33,180	$15,960	$5,880	$3,045	$1,575

== Men's singles ==
=== Seeds ===
1. (China) Shi Yuqi (quarter-finals)
2. (Denmark) Anders Antonsen (quarter-finals)
3. (China) Li Shifeng (quarter-finals)
4. (Japan) Kodai Naraoka (quarter-finals)
5. (Chinese Taipei) Chou Tien-chen (withdrew)
6. (Japan) Kenta Nishimoto (first round)
7. (China) Lu Guangzu (champion)
8. (Chinese Taipei) Lin Chun-yi (semi-finals)

=== Finals ===
Semi-finals
SWM	(Hong Kong) Lee Cheuk Yiu	21	19	12
7	(China) Lu Guangzu	13	21	21
(Chinese Taipei) Lee Chia-hao	21	22
8	(Chinese Taipei) Lin Chun-yi	18	20

Final
7	(China) Lu Guangzu	21	20	21
(Chinese Taipei) Lee Chia-hao	16	22	18

=== Top half ===
==== Section 1 ====
First round
1	(China) Shi YQ	21	21
Q2	(South Korea) Son W-h	13	18
(Hong Kong) Ng K L	22	14	23
(France) A Lanier	20	21	21
SWM	(Hong Kong) Lee C Y	21	21
Q1	(South Korea) Kim D-h	18	17
(Indonesia) C A D Wardoyo	17	15
PFQ	(Hong Kong) J Gunawan	21	21

Second round
1	(China) Shi YQ	21	21
(Hong Kong) Ng K L	16	12
SWM	(Hong Kong) Lee C Y	21	20	21
PFQ	(Hong Kong) J Gunawan	17	22	11

Quarter-finals
1	(China) Shi YQ	13	15
SWM	(Hong Kong) Lee C Y	21	21

==== Section 2 ====
First round
4	(Japan) K Naraoka	0
PFQ	(Chinese Taipei) Wang P-w	1^{r}
Q4	(Chinese Taipei) Huang Y-k	20	23	13
(Canada) B Yang	22	21	21
7	(China) Lu GZ	21	10	21
(China) Weng HY	13	21	16
(France) A Merklé	18	21	21
(Denmark) R Gemke	21	18	23

Second round
4	(Japan) K Naraoka	21	7	21
(Canada) B Yang	15	21	19
7	(China) Lu GZ	21	21
(Denmark) R Gemke	16	11

Quarter-finals
4	(Japan) K Naraoka	22	20	12
7	(China) Lu GZ	20	22	21

=== Bottom half ===
==== Section 3 ====
First round
(Chinese Taipei) Lee C-h	22	10	21
(South Korea) Jeon H-j	20	21	19
(Chinese Taipei) Su L-y	16	22	21
6	(Japan) K Nishimoto	21	20	15
(Japan) K Takahashi	21	18	20
(Thailand) K Wangcharoen	11	21	22
(Chinese Taipei) Chi Y-j	15	14
3	(China) Li SF	21	21

Second round
(Chinese Taipei) Lee C-h	21	21
(Chinese Taipei) Su L-y	11	18
(Thailand) K Wangcharoen	11	10
3	(China) Li SF	21	21

Quarter-finals
(Chinese Taipei) Lee C-h	21	21
3	(China) Li SF	14	18

==== Section 4 ====
First round
(Japan) T Obayashi	22	21
(Malaysia) Leong J H	20	14
(Japan) Y Tanaka	21	16	8
8	(Chinese Taipei) Lin C-y	18	21	21
(Singapore) J Teh	19	19
(China) Lei LX	21	21
Q3	(Hong Kong) Chan Y C	11	8
2	(Denmark) A Antonsen	21	21

Second round
(Japan) T Obayashi	17	9
8	(Chinese Taipei) Lin C-y	21	21
(China) Lei LX	21	14	19
2	(Denmark) A Antonsen	19	21	21

Quarter-finals
8	(Chinese Taipei) Lin C-y	21	17	21
2	(Denmark) A Antonsen	13	21	19

== Women's singles ==
=== Seeds ===
1. (Japan) Akane Yamaguchi (first round)
2. (China) Wang Zhiyi (final)
3. (China) Han Yue (quarter-finals)
4. (Japan) Nozomi Okuhara (withdrew)
5. (Thailand) Supanida Katethong (withdrew)
6. (Thailand) Busanan Ongbamrungphan (second round)
7. (South Korea) Kim Ga-eun (champion)
8. (China) Zhang Yiman (second round)

=== Finals ===
Semi-finals
Q1	(Chinese Taipei) Lin Hsiang-ti	10	14
7	(South Korea) Kim Ga-eun	21	21
(South Korea) Sim Yu-jin	21	13	22
2	(China) Wang Zhiyi	19	21	24

Final
7	(South Korea) Kim Ga-eun	w	/	o
2	(China) Wang Zhiyi

=== Top half ===
==== Section 1 ====
First round
1	(Japan) A Yamaguchi	17	18
(Hong Kong) Lo S Y	21	21
Q1	(Chinese Taipei) Lin H-t	21	13	22
(Indonesia) E N T Wardoyo	9	21	20
6	(Thailand) B Ongbamrungphan	21	21
(Chinese Taipei) Pai Y-p	16	10
Q3	(South Korea) Kim J-e	19	5
(Chinese Taipei) Chiu P-c	21	21

Second round
(Hong Kong) Lo S Y	17	14
Q1	(Chinese Taipei) Lin H-t	21	21
6	(Thailand) B Ongbamrungphan	20	2^{r}
(Chinese Taipei) Chiu P-c	22	7

Quarter-finals
Q1	(Chinese Taipei) Lin H-t	21	22	21
(Chinese Taipei) Chiu P-c	14	24	15

==== Section 2 ====
First round
3	(China) Han Y	21	8	21
Q2	(South Korea) Kim G-r	15	21	15
(Canada) W Y Zhang	14	11
(Japan) M Suizu	21	21
7	(South Korea) Kim G-e	21	14	21
(Chinese Taipei) Hsu W-c	19	21	16
(Denmark) L Christophersen	21	21
(India) A Kashyap	15	15

Second round
3	(China) Han Y	21	13	21
(Japan) M Suizu	13	21	15
7	(South Korea) Kim G-e	21	21
(Denmark) L Christophersen	17	16

Quarter-finals
3	(China) Han Y	19	21	17
7	(South Korea) Kim G-e	21	19	21

=== Bottom half ===
==== Section 3 ====
First round
(Japan) T Miyazaki	18	21	16
(Thailand) P Choeikeewong	21	10	21
(Canada) M Li	19	11
SWM	(Singapore) Yeo J M	21	21
PFQ	(Chinese Taipei) Liang T-y	16	6
(South Korea) Sim Y-j	21	21
Q4	(Japan) A Kurihara	21	12
8	(China) Zhang YM	23	21

Second round
(Thailand) P Choeikeewong	16	17
SWM	(Singapore) Yeo J M	21	21
(South Korea) Sim Y-j	21	21
8	(China) Zhang YM	16	19

Quarter-finals
SWM	(Singapore) Yeo J M	21	14	5
(South Korea) Sim Y-j	13	21	21

==== Section 4 ====
First round
(India) M Bansod	21	15	17
(Denmark) L Kjærsfeldt	18	21	21
(India) A Chaliha	8	13
SWM	(Thailand) P Chochuwong	21	21
PFQ	(Chinese Taipei) Huang Y-h	21	21
(United States) L Lam	9	18
(Japan) N Nidaira	21	9
2	(China) Wang ZY	23	21

Second round
(Denmark) L Kjærsfeldt	21	9	17
SWM	(Thailand) P Chochuwong	17	21	21
PFQ	(Chinese Taipei) Huang Y-h	14	10
2	(China) Wang ZY	21	21

Quarter-finals
SWM	(Thailand) P Chochuwong	17	19
2	(China) Wang ZY	21	21

== Men's doubles ==
=== Seeds ===
1. (South Korea) Kang Min-hyuk / Seo Seung-jae (final)
2. (China) He Jiting / Ren Xiangyu (quarter-finals)
3. (Chinese Taipei) Lee Jhe-huei / Yang Po-hsuan (second round)
4. (Malaysia) Goh Sze Fei / Nur Izzuddin (first round)
5. (Malaysia) Man Wei Chong / Tee Kai Wun (first round)
6. (Thailand) Supak Jomkoh / Kittinupong Kedren (quarter-finals)
7. (Indonesia) Leo Rolly Carnando / Bagas Maulana (champions)
8. (Indonesia) Muhammad Shohibul Fikri / Daniel Marthin (semi-finals)

=== Finals ===
Semi-finals
1	(South Korea) Kang Min-hyuk (South Korea) Seo Seung-jae	25	25	21
(Chinese Taipei) Chiu Hsiang-chieh (Chinese Taipei) Wang Chi-lin	27	23	11
7	(Indonesia) Leo Rolly Carnando (Indonesia) Bagas Maulana	21	21
8	(Indonesia) Muhammad Shohibul Fikri (Indonesia) Daniel Marthin	9	14

Final
1	(South Korea) Kang Min-hyuk (South Korea) Seo Seung-jae	21	9	8
7	(Indonesia) Leo Rolly Carnando (Indonesia) Bagas Maulana	18	21	21

=== Top half ===
==== Section 1 ====
First round
1	(South Korea) Kang M-h (South Korea) Seo S-j	21	22
(Chinese Taipei) Lin B-w (Chinese Taipei) Su C-h	13	20
(Malaysia) Boon X Y (Malaysia) Goh V S	17	23	21
(United States) Chen Z-y (United States) P Smith	21	21	11
6	(Thailand) S Jomkoh (Thailand) K Kedren	21	16	22
(Denmark) D Lundgaard (Denmark) M Vestergaard	15	21	20
(Denmark) A Søndergaard (Denmark) J Toft	21	21
(Germany) B Geiss (Germany) J C Voelker	15	12

Second round
1	(South Korea) Kang M-h (South Korea) Seo S-j	21	21
(Malaysia) Boon X Y (Malaysia) Goh V S	13	11
6	(Thailand) S Jomkoh (Thailand) K Kedren	21	21
(Denmark) A Søndergaard (Denmark) J Toft	14	19

Quarter-finals
1	(South Korea) Kang M-h (South Korea) Seo S-j	21	21
6	(Thailand) S Jomkoh (Thailand) K Kedren	12	15

==== Section 2 ====
First round
3	(Chinese Taipei) Lee J-h (Chinese Taipei) Yang P-hs	21	21
(Chinese Taipei) Chen Z-r (Chinese Taipei) Lin Y-c	13	15
(Chinese Taipei) Chiu H-c (Chinese Taipei) Wang C-l	21	19	25
(South Korea) Ko S-h (South Korea) Shin B-c	12	21	23
5	(Malaysia) Man W C (Malaysia) Tee K W	15	19
(South Korea) Kim G-j (South Korea) Kim S-r	21	21
(China) Xie HN (China) Zheng WH	17	21	21
(Chinese Taipei) Liu K-h (Chinese Taipei) Yang P-ha	21	19	18

Second round
3	(Chinese Taipei) Lee J-h (Chinese Taipei) Yang P-hs	17	21	19
(Chinese Taipei) Chiu H-c (Chinese Taipei) Wang C-l	21	11	21
(South Korea) Kim G-j (South Korea) Kim S-r	21	13	21
(China) Xie HN (China) Zheng WH	12	21	17

Quarter-finals
(Chinese Taipei) Chiu H-c (Chinese Taipei) Wang C-l	21	21
(South Korea) Kim G-j (South Korea) Kim S-r	16	16

=== Bottom half ===
==== Section 3 ====
First round
(Canada) K Lee (Canada) T A Lindeman	19	11
(Malaysia) N M Azriyn Ayub (Malaysia) Tan W K	21	21
(Chinese Taipei) Lu M-c (Chinese Taipei) Tang K-w	13	16
7	(Indonesia) L R Carnando (Indonesia) B Maulana	21	21
(South Korea) Choi S-g (South Korea) Heo K-h	23	15	21
(Chinese Taipei) Lu C-y (Chinese Taipei) Wei C-w	21	21	19
(Malaysia) Choong H J (Malaysia) M Haikal	13	21	21
4	(Malaysia) Goh S F (Malaysia) N Izzuddin	21	16	16

Second round
(Malaysia) N M Azriyn Ayub (Malaysia) Tan W K	17	11
7	(Indonesia) L R Carnando (Indonesia) B Maulana	21	21
(South Korea) Choi S-g (South Korea) Heo K-h	21	12	21
(Malaysia) Choong H J (Malaysia) M Haikal	18	21	17

Quarter-finals
7	(Indonesia) L R Carnando (Indonesia) B Maulana	21	21
(South Korea) Choi S-g (South Korea) Heo K-h	17	17

==== Section 4 ====
First round
(Chinese Taipei) Lee F-c (Chinese Taipei) Lee F-j	21	27
(Malaysia) Low HY (Malaysia) Ng EC	16	25
(Chinese Taipei) Chen C-k (Chinese Taipei) Chen S-f	13	16
8	(Indonesia) M S Fikri (Indonesia) D Marthin	21	21
(China) Chen BY (China) Liu Y	23	15	22
(China) Huang D (China) Zhou HD	21	21	20
(Chinese Taipei) Chiang C-w (Chinese Taipei) Wu H-y	23	19	15
2	(China) He JT (China) Ren XY	21	21	21

Second round
(Chinese Taipei) Lee F-c (Chinese Taipei) Lee F-j	19	21	16
8	(Indonesia) M S Fikri (Indonesia) D Marthin	21	15	21
(China) Chen BY (China) Liu Y	17	18
2	(China) He JT (China) Ren XY	21	21

Quarter-finals
8	(Indonesia) M S Fikri (Indonesia) D Marthin	22	13	21
2	(China) He JT (China) Ren XY	20	21	16

== Women's doubles ==
=== Seeds ===
1. (South Korea) Baek Ha-na / Lee So-hee (semi-finals)
2. (Japan) Nami Matsuyama / Chiharu Shida (second round)
3. (South Korea) Kim So-yeong / Kong Hee-yong (second round)
4. (Malaysia) Pearly Tan / Thinaah Muralitharan (final)
5. (China) Li Yijing / Luo Xumin (quarter-finals)
6. (South Korea) Jeong Na-eun / Kim Hye-jeong (champions)
7. (China) Keng Shuliang / Zhang Shuxian (second round)
8. (South Korea) Lee Yu-lim / Shin Seung-chan (semi-finals)

=== Finals ===
Semi-finals
1	(South Korea) Baek Ha-na (South Korea) Lee So-hee	18	13
4	(Malaysia) Pearly Tan (Malaysia) Thinaah Muralitharan	21	21
6	(South Korea) Jeong Na-eun (South Korea) Kim Hye-jeong	21	21
8	(South Korea) Lee Yu-lim (South Korea) Shin Seung-chan	14	11

Final
4	(Malaysia) Pearly Tan (Malaysia) Thinaah Muralitharan	12	11
6	(South Korea) Jeong Na-eun (South Korea) Kim Hye-jeong	21	21

=== Top half ===
==== Section 1 ====
First round
(Canada) J Cheung (Canada) C Choi	13	16
(Malaysia) Go P K (Malaysia) Teoh M X	21	21
(Chinese Taipei) Chang C-h (Chinese Taipei) Yang C-t	21	18	8
(United States) F Corbett (United States) A Lee	19	21	21

Second round
1	(South Korea) Baek H-n (South Korea) Lee S-h	21	21
(Malaysia) Go P K (Malaysia) Teoh M X	14	10
5	(China) Li YJ (China) Luo XM	23	21
(United States) F Corbett (United States) A Lee	21	13

Quarter-finals
1	(South Korea) Baek H-n (South Korea) Lee S-h	21	21
5	(China) Li YJ (China) Luo XM	18	17

==== Section 2 ====
First round
(Chinese Taipei) N G Chan (Chinese Taipei) Lin C-c	21	21
(Chinese Taipei) Jiang Y-h (Chinese Taipei) Li Z-q	12	13
(Chinese Taipei) Teng C-h (Chinese Taipei) Yang C-y	21	21
(Thailand) O Jongsathapornparn (Thailand) S Suwachai	15	5

Second round
4	(Malaysia) P Tan (Malaysia) Thinaah M	21	21	21
(Chinese Taipei) N G Chan (Chinese Taipei) Lin C-c	23	12	12
7	(China) Keng SL (China) Zhang SX	21	20	18
(Chinese Taipei) Teng C-h (Chinese Taipei) Yang C-y	17	22	21

Quarter-finals
4	(Malaysia) P Tan (Malaysia) Thinaah M	21	21
(Chinese Taipei) Teng C-h (Chinese Taipei) Yang C-y	19	15

=== Bottom half ===
==== Section 3 ====
First round
(Chinese Taipei) Hsu Y-c (Chinese Taipei) Liu C-y	22	22	13
(Japan) K Ishikawa (Japan) M Konegawa	20	24	21
(Chinese Taipei) Hu L-f (Chinese Taipei) Jheng Y-c	21	20	15
(Chinese Taipei) Hsu Y-h (Chinese Taipei) Lin J-y	17	22	21

Second round
(Japan) K Ishikawa (Japan) M Konegawa	13	10
6	(South Korea) Jeong N-e (South Korea) Kim H-j	21	21
(Chinese Taipei) Hsu Y-h (Chinese Taipei) Lin J-y	9	21	21
3	(South Korea) Kim S-y (South Korea) Kong H-y	21	18	15

Quarter-finals
6	(South Korea) Jeong N-e (South Korea) Kim H-j	21	21
(Chinese Taipei) Hsu Y-h (Chinese Taipei) Lin J-y	17	9

==== Section 4 ====
First round
(Chinese Taipei) Sung Y-h (Chinese Taipei) Wang Y-q	21	21
(Malaysia) Lai P J (Malaysia) Lim C S	15	11
(Chinese Taipei) Hsieh P-s (Chinese Taipei) Hung E-t	21	21
(India) R Panda (India) S Panda	18	5

Second round
(Chinese Taipei) Sung Y-h (Chinese Taipei) Wang Y-q	4	8
8	(South Korea) Lee Y-l (South Korea) Shin S-c	21	21
(Chinese Taipei) Hsieh P-s (Chinese Taipei) Hung E-t	3
2	(Japan) N Matsuyama (Japan) C Shida	1^{r}

Quarter-finals
8	(South Korea) Lee Y-l (South Korea) Shin S-c	21	21
(Chinese Taipei) Hsieh P-s (Chinese Taipei) Hung E-t	16	14

== Mixed doubles ==
=== Seeds ===
1. (South Korea) Seo Seung-jae / Chae Yoo-jung (withdrew)
2. (China) Jiang Zhenbang / Wei Yaxin (second round)
3. (South Korea) Kim Won-ho / Jeong Na-eun (semi-finals)
4. (Malaysia) Chen Tang Jie / Toh Ee Wei (champions)
5. (Malaysia) Goh Soon Huat / Shevon Jemie Lai (quarter-finals)
6. (Malaysia) Tan Kian Meng / Lai Pei Jing (second round)
7. (Singapore) Terry Hee / Jessica Tan (first round)
8. (Indonesia) Dejan Ferdinansyah / Gloria Emanuelle Widjaja (first round)

=== Finals ===
Semi-finals
3	(South Korea) Kim Won-ho (South Korea) Jeong Na-eun	14	24	10
(China) Guo Xinwa (China) Li Qian	21	22	21
4	(Malaysia) Chen Tang Jie (Malaysia) Toh Ee Wei	22	21
(China) Cheng Xing (China) Zhang Chi	20	19

Final
(China) Guo Xinwa (China) Li Qian	21	13	13
4	(Malaysia) Chen Tang Jie (Malaysia) Toh Ee Wei	17	21	21

=== Top half ===
==== Section 1 ====
First round
(United States) Chen Z-y (United States) F Corbett	7	14
(Indonesia) R N Kusharjanto (Indonesia) L A Kusumawati	21	21
6	(Malaysia) Tan K M (Malaysia) Lai P J	21	21
(United States) P Smith (United States) A Lee	14	11
(Chinese Taipei) Yang P-hs (Chinese Taipei) Hu L-f	21	21
(Chinese Taipei) Chen C-k (Chinese Taipei) Hsu Y-h	17	15

Second round
3	(South Korea) Kim W-h (South Korea) Jeong N-e	19	21	23
(Indonesia) R N Kusharjanto (Indonesia) L A Kusumawati	21	10	21
6	(Malaysia) Tan K M (Malaysia) Lai P J	21	16	14
(Chinese Taipei) Yang P-hs (Chinese Taipei) Hu L-f	14	21	21

Quarter-finals
3	(South Korea) Kim W-h (South Korea) Jeong N-e	15	21	21
(Chinese Taipei) Yang P-hs (Chinese Taipei) Hu L-f	21	17	13

==== Section 2 ====
First round
7	(Singapore) T Hee (Singapore) J Tan	15	21	9
(China) Guo XW (China) Li Q	21	15	21
(India) A R Gupta (India) S Swain	7	12
(South Korea) Ko S-h (South Korea) Eom H-w	21	21
SWM	(Japan) H Midorikawa (Japan) N Saito	9	21	12
(Denmark) J Toft (Denmark) A Magelund	21	14	21
(Denmark) M Vestergaard (Denmark) C Busch	16	17
(China) Zhou ZH (China) Yang JY	21	21

Second round
(China) Guo XW (China) Li Q	18	21	21
(South Korea) Ko S-h (South Korea) Eom H-w	21	9	8
(Denmark) J Toft (Denmark) A Magelund	21	22
(China) Zhou ZH (China) Yang JY	18	20

Quarter-finals
(China) Guo XW (China) Li Q	21	14	21
(Denmark) J Toft (Denmark) A Magelund	14	21	11

=== Bottom half ===
==== Section 3 ====
First round
(Malaysia) Choong H J (Malaysia) Go P K	12	21	12
5	(Malaysia) Goh S H (Malaysia) S J Lai	21	15	21
(Chinese Taipei) Liu K-h (Chinese Taipei) Jheng Y-c	21	17	21
(Malaysia) Hoo P R (Malaysia) Cheng S Y	18	21	14
(Chinese Taipei) Lin B-w (Chinese Taipei) Lin C-c	17	10
4	(Malaysia) Chen T J (Malaysia) Toh E W	21	21

Second round
(Chinese Taipei) Chen Z-r (Chinese Taipei) Yang C-t	13	17
5	(Malaysia) Goh S H (Malaysia) S J Lai	21	21
(Chinese Taipei) Liu K-h (Chinese Taipei) Jheng Y-c	16	19
4	(Malaysia) Chen T J (Malaysia) Toh E W	21	21

Quarter-finals
5	(Malaysia) Goh S H (Malaysia) S J Lai	18	11
4	(Malaysia) Chen T J (Malaysia) Toh E W	21	21

==== Section 4 ====
First round
(Chinese Taipei) Chiu H-c (Chinese Taipei) Lin J-y	11	16
(Malaysia) Wong T C (Malaysia) Lim C S	21	21
(Chinese Taipei) Ye H-w (Chinese Taipei) N G Chan	21	11	21
8	(Indonesia) D Ferdinansyah (Indonesia) G E Widjaja	16	21	7
(China) Cheng X (China) Zhang C	18	21	21
(Chinese Taipei) Lu M-c (Chinese Taipei) Hung E-t	21	18	17
(Chinese Taipei) Wu H-y (Chinese Taipei) Yang C-y	21	14	13
2	(China) Jiang ZB (China) Wei YX	18	21	21

Second round
(Malaysia) Wong T C (Malaysia) Lim C S	18	17
(Chinese Taipei) Ye H-w (Chinese Taipei) N G Chan	21	21
(China) Cheng X (China) Zhang C	21	16	25
2	(China) Jiang ZB (China) Wei YX	17	21	23

Quarter-finals
(Chinese Taipei) Ye H-w (Chinese Taipei) N G Chan	9	19
(China) Cheng X (China) Zhang C	21	21

Preceded by 2024 Japan Open	BWF World Tour; 2024 BWF season	Succeeded by 2024 Taipei Open
