= 2024 Orléans Masters =

Badminton tournament in France

Tournament details
- Dates: 12–17 March
- Edition: 12th
- Level: Super 300
- Total prize money: US$210,000
- Venue: Palais des Sports
- Location: Orléans, France

Champions
- Men's singles: (Japan) Yushi Tanaka
- Women's singles: (Japan) Tomoka Miyazaki
- Men's doubles: (Malaysia) Choong Hon Jian (Malaysia) Muhammad Haikal
- Women's doubles: (Indonesia) Meilysa Trias Puspita Sari (Indonesia) Rachel Allessya Rose
- Mixed doubles: (China) Cheng Xing (China) Zhang Chi

The 2024 Orléans Masters (officially known as the Orléans Masters Badminton presented by Victor 2024 for sponsorship reasons) was a badminton tournament that took place at the Palais des Sports, Orléans, France, from 12 to 17 March 2024 and had a total prize of US$210,000.

== Tournament ==
The 2024 Orléans Masters was the eighth tournament of the 2024 BWF World Tour and was part of the Orléans Masters championships, which had been held since 2012. This tournament was organized by the Orléans Masters with sanction from the BWF.

=== Venue ===
This tournament was held at the Palais des Sports in Orléans, France.

=== Point distribution ===
Below is the point distribution table for each phase of the tournament based on the BWF points system for the BWF World Tour Super 300 event.

Winner	Runner-up	3/4	5/8	9/16	17/32	33/64	65/128
7,000	5,950	4,900	3,850	2,750	1,670	660	320

=== Prize pool ===
The total prize money was US$210,000 with the distribution of the prize money in accordance with BWF regulations.

Event	Winner	Finalist	Semi-finals	Quarter-finals	Last 16
Singles	$15,750	$7,980	$3,045	$1,260	$735
Doubles	$16,590	$7,980	$2,940	$1,522.5	$787.5

== Men's singles ==
=== Seeds ===
1. (Japan) Takuma Obayashi (quarter-finals)
2. (China) Lei Lanxi (semi-finals)
3. (India) Kiran George (first round)
4. (Malaysia) Leong Jun Hao (first round)
5. (Chinese Taipei) Chi Yu-jen (semi-finals)
6. (Guatemala) Kevin Cordón (first round)
7. (Republic of Ireland) Nhat Nguyen (quarter-finals)
8. (Thailand) Kantaphon Wangcharoen (first round)

=== Finals ===
Semi-finals
5	(Chinese Taipei) Chi Yu-jen	19	12
(Japan) Koo Takahashi	21	21
(Japan) Yushi Tanaka	19	21	21
2	(China) Lei Lanxi	21	19	15

Final
(Japan) Koo Takahashi	18	10
(Japan) Yushi Tanaka	21	21

=== Top half ===
==== Section 1 ====
First round
1	(Japan) T Obayashi	14	21	21
(Brazil) J Matias	21	13	15
(Brazil) Y Coelho	21	19	21
(Singapore) J Teh	17	21	17
5	(Chinese Taipei) Chi Y-j	21	21
Q4	(Germany) M Weißkirchen	7	12
(Italy) G Toti	19	20
(Czech Republic) J Louda	21	22

Second round
1	(Japan) T Obayashi	22	21
(Brazil) Y Coelho	20	12
5	(Chinese Taipei) Chi Y-j	w	/	o
(Czech Republic) J Louda

Quarter-finals
1	(Japan) T Obayashi	21	13	19
5	(Chinese Taipei) Chi Y-j	14	21	21

==== Section 2 ====
First round
4	(Malaysia) Leong J H	21	8	17
(South Korea) Jeon H-j	17	21	21
(Malaysia) Cheam J W	21	21
(Israel) M Zilberman	13	13
8	(Thailand) K Wangcharoen	16	21	13
(Denmark) M Christophersen	21	10	21
(Japan) K Takahashi	21	19	21
Q3	(Israel) D Dubovenko	9	21	7

Second round
(South Korea) Jeon H-j	18	25
(Malaysia) Cheam J W	21	27
(Denmark) M Christophersen	20	14
(Japan) K Takahashi	22	21

Quarter-finals
(Malaysia) Cheam J W	13	8
(Japan) K Takahashi	21	21

=== Bottom half ===
==== Section 3 ====
First round
(India) S Subramanian	19	16
(France) A Lanier	21	21
(Finland) K Koljonen	21	21
6	(Guatemala) K Cordón	18	18
(Netherlands) M Caljouw	13	22	9
(Japan) Y Tanaka	21	20	21
(India) S K Karunakaran	21	17	23
3	(India) K George	7	21	21

Second round
(France) A Lanier	21	21
(Finland) K Koljonen	15	10
(Japan) Y Tanaka	21	21
(India) S K Karunakaran	19	7

Quarter-finals
(France) A Lanier	8	22	10
(Japan) Y Tanaka	21	20	21

==== Section 4 ====
First round
(Spain) P Abián	19	21	21
Q2	(Kazakhstan) D Panarin	21	9	14
Q1	(France) E Roy	18	11
7	(Republic of Ireland) N Nguyen	21	21
(Azerbaijan) A R Dwicahyo	21	21
(India) M Manjunath	18	15
PFQ	(Finland) J Oldorff	8	18
2	(China) Lei LX	21	21

Second round
(Spain) P Abián	17	7
7	(Republic of Ireland) N Nguyen	21	21
(Azerbaijan) A R Dwicahyo	9	22	13
2	(China) Lei LX	21	20	21

Quarter-finals
7	(Republic of Ireland) N Nguyen	17	17
2	(China) Lei LX	21	21

== Women's singles ==
=== Seeds ===
1. (Japan) Natsuki Nidaira (first round)
2. (Denmark) Line Christophersen (quarter-finals)
3. (Japan) Tomoka Miyazaki (champion)
4. (Chinese Taipei) Lin Hsiang-ti (first round)
5. (Denmark) Julie Dawall Jakobsen (first round)
6. (Thailand) Pornpicha Choeikeewong (first round)
7. (United States) Iris Wang (quarter-finals)
8. (India) Malvika Bansod (first round)

=== Finals ===
Semi-finals
Q2	(China) Chen Lu	10^{r}
3	(Japan) Tomoka Miyazaki	5
Q1	(Japan) Hina Akechi	21	21
(Japan) Manami Suizu	11	15

Final
3	(Japan) Tomoka Miyazaki	21	21
Q1	(Japan) Hina Akechi	18	12

=== Top half ===
==== Section 1 ====
First round
1	(Japan) N Nidaira	21	12	13
Q2	(China) Chen L	19	21	21
(France) R O Pancasari	10	21	15
(France) L Huet	21	17	21
5	(Denmark) J D Jakobsen	10	16
(Azerbaijan) K F Azzahra	21	21
(Japan) A Takahashi	21	19	21
(Ukraine) P Buhrova	19	21	19

Second round
Q2	(China) Chen L	21	21
(France) L Huet	14	15
(Azerbaijan) K F Azzahra	14	12
(Japan) A Takahashi	21	21

Quarter-finals
Q2	(China) Chen L	21	21
(Japan) A Takahashi	10	12

==== Section 2 ====
First round
3	(Japan) T Miyazaki	21	0
(Switzerland) J Stadelmann	15	0^{r}
(India) Samiya I F	21	20	12
(Belgium) L Tan	19	22	21
8	(India) M Bansod	10	15
(Hungary) V Sándorházi	21	21
(Brazil) J Vieira	21	13	11
Q3	(Denmark) A Schulz	16	21	21

Second round
3	(Japan) T Miyazaki	21	21
(Belgium) L Tan	10	15
(Hungary) V Sándorházi	19	21	16
Q3	(Denmark) A Schulz	21	17	21

Quarter-finals
3	(Japan) T Miyazaki	21	21
Q3	(Denmark) A Schulz	14	14

=== Bottom half ===
==== Section 3 ====
First round
(Chinese Taipei) Huang Y-h	19	21	11
(Hong Kong) Lo S Y	21	15	21
(France) Qi XF	15	21	8
7	(United States) I Wang	21	19	21
Q4	(India) A Upadhyaya	21	21
(Bulgaria) K Nalbantova	7	5
Q1	(Japan) H Akechi	21	21
4	(Chinese Taipei) Lin H-t	16	15

Second round
(Hong Kong) Lo S Y	19	15
7	(United States) I Wang	21	21
Q4	(India) A Upadhyaya	22	15	10
Q1	(Japan) H Akechi	20	21	21

Quarter-finals
7	(United States) I Wang	15	21	18
Q1	(Japan) H Akechi	21	15	21

==== Section 4 ====
First round
(Japan) M Suizu	21	21
(Republic of Ireland) R Darragh	8	7
(Spain) C Azurmendi	15	21	21
6	(Thailand) P Choeikeewong	21	19	17
PFQ	(India) T Hemanth	14	11
(Chinese Taipei) Liang T-y	21	21
(Czech Republic) T Švábíková	11	18
2	(Denmark) L Christophersen	21	21

Second round
(Japan) M Suizu	21	21
(Spain) C Azurmendi	9	11
(Chinese Taipei) Liang T-y	21	18	7
2	(Denmark) L Christophersen	18	21	21

Quarter-finals
(Japan) M Suizu	17	21	21
2	(Denmark) L Christophersen	21	12	18

== Men's doubles ==
=== Seeds ===
1. (Germany) Mark Lamsfuß / Marvin Seidel (withdrew)
2. (Denmark) Daniel Lundgaard / Mads Vestergaard (quarter-finals)
3. (Thailand) Pharanyu Kaosamaang / Worrapol Thongsa-nga (first round)
4. (Malaysia) Choong Hon Jian / Muhammad Haikal (champions)
5. (India) Arjun M. R. / Dhruv Kapila (second round)
6. (Indonesia) Sabar Karyaman Gutama / Muhammad Reza Pahlevi Isfahani (final)
7. (Denmark) Andreas Søndergaard / Jesper Toft (second round)
8. (Malaysia) Low Hang Yee / Ng Eng Cheong (second round)

=== Finals ===
Semi-finals
7	(Denmark) Andreas Søndergaard (Denmark) Jesper Toft	18	16
4	(Malaysia) Choong Hon Jian (Malaysia) Muhammad Haikal	21	21
6	(Indonesia) Sabar Karyaman Gutama (Indonesia) Muhammad Reza Pahlevi Isfahani	21	23
(Chinese Taipei) Chen Zhi-ray (Chinese Taipei) Lin Yu-chieh	17	21

Final
4	(Malaysia) Choong Hon Jian (Malaysia) Muhammad Haikal	21	18	21
6	(Indonesia) Sabar Karyaman Gutama (Indonesia) Muhammad Reza Pahlevi Isfahani	15	21	14

=== Top half ===
==== Section 1 ====
First round
PFQ	(France) M Cattoen (France) L Renoir	21	17	25
(United States) Chen Z-y (United States) P Smith	17	21	23
(India) K P Garaga (India) K S Pratheek	21	21
(Bulgaria) I Rusev (Bulgaria) I Stoynov	10	18
7	(Denmark) A Søndergaard (Denmark) J Toft	21	21
Q1	(Poland) R Cybulski (Poland) S Slepecki	16	18
(China) Xie HN (China) Zeng WH	18	21	11
(Chinese Taipei) Wei C-w (Chinese Taipei) Wu G-x	21	19	21

Second round
PFQ	(France) M Cattoen (France) L Renoir	14	9
(India) K P Garaga (India) K S Pratheek	21	21
7	(Denmark) A Søndergaard (Denmark) J Toft	21	21
(Chinese Taipei) Wei C-w (Chinese Taipei) Wu G-x	18	16

Quarter-finals
(India) K P Garaga (India) K S Pratheek	17	16
7	(Denmark) A Søndergaard (Denmark) J Toft	21	21

==== Section 2 ====
First round
4	(Malaysia) Choong H J (Malaysia) M Haikal	21	20	21
(Malaysia) Lwi S H (Malaysia) J Wong	16	22	11
(Denmark) W K Boe (Denmark) C F Kjær	21	21
(Norway) T Flaatten (Norway) V Rikheim	12	13
5	(India) Arjun M. R. (India) D Kapila	21	21
(Chinese Taipei) Lu M-c (Chinese Taipei) Tang K-w	13	12
Q2	(Denmark) R Espersen (Denmark) M Rindshøj	14	15
(China) Huang D (China) Liu Yi	21	21

Second round
4	(Malaysia) Choong H J (Malaysia) M Haikal	21	21
(Denmark) W K Boe (Denmark) C F Kjær	15	18
5	(India) Arjun M. R. (India) D Kapila	15	17
(China) Huang D (China) Liu Yi	21	21

Quarter-finals
4	(Malaysia) Choong H J (Malaysia) M Haikal	21	21
(China) Huang D (China) Liu Yi	9	18

=== Bottom half ===
==== Section 3 ====
First round
(Chinese Taipei) Chen C-k (Chinese Taipei) Chen S-f	21	13	28
(Germany) B Geiss (Germany) J C Völker	17	21	26
(France) É Adam (France) L Rossi	17	16
6	(Indonesia) S K Gutama (Indonesia) M R P Isfahani	21	21
(Brazil) F Farias (Brazil) D Silva	21	8	11
Q3	(Germany) D Hess (Germany) P Scheiel	18	21	21
(England) C Hemming (England) Et van Leeuwen	21	14	21
3	(Thailand) P Kaosamaang (Thailand) W Thongsa-nga	17	21	19

Second round
(Chinese Taipei) Chen C-k (Chinese Taipei) Chen S-f	22	18	17
6	(Indonesia) S K Gutama (Indonesia) M R P Isfahani	20	21	21
Q3	(Germany) D Hess (Germany) P Scheiel	18	19
(England) C Hemming (England) Et van Leeuwen	21	21

Quarter-finals
6	(Indonesia) S K Gutama (Indonesia) M R P Isfahani	21	21
(England) C Hemming (England) Et van Leeuwen	16	8

==== Section 4 ====
First round
(Mexico) J Castillo (Mexico) L Montoya	13	21	13
(Chinese Taipei) Chen Z-r (Chinese Taipei) Lin Y-c	21	18	21
Q4	(Spain) R García (Spain) C Piris	23	15	15
8	(Malaysia) Low H Y (Malaysia) Ng E C	21	21	21
(Scotland) C Grimley (Scotland) M Grimley	21	21
(Germany) J R Jansen (Germany) K Neumann	12	8	to
(China) Chen BY (China) Liu Ya	15	16
2	(Denmark) D Lundgaard (Denmark) M Vestergaard	21	21

Second round
(Chinese Taipei) Chen Z-r (Chinese Taipei) Lin Y-c	21	21
8	(Malaysia) Low H Y (Malaysia) Ng E C	18	17
(Scotland) C Grimley (Scotland) M Grimley	22	21	18
2	(Denmark) D Lundgaard (Denmark) M Vestergaard	24	16	21

Quarter-finals
(Chinese Taipei) Chen Z-r (Chinese Taipei) Lin Y-c	14	21	21
2	(Denmark) D Lundgaard (Denmark) M Vestergaard	21	19	18

== Women's doubles ==
=== Seeds ===
1. (Indonesia) Febriana Dwipuji Kusuma / Amallia Cahaya Pratiwi (second round)
2. (France) Margot Lambert / Anne Tran (semi-finals)
3. (Bulgaria) Gabriela Stoeva / Stefani Stoeva (semi-finals)
4. (Japan) Rui Hirokami / Yuna Kato (final)
5. (Indonesia) Lanny Tria Mayasari / Ribka Sugiarto (quarter-finals)
6. (Indonesia) Meilysa Trias Puspita Sari / Rachel Allessya Rose (champions)
7. (Germany) Linda Efler / Isabel Lohau (withdrew)
8. (Chinese Taipei) Chang Ching-hui / Yang Ching-tun (second round)

=== Finals ===
Semi-finals
6	(Indonesia) Meilysa Trias Puspita Sari (Indonesia) Rachel Allessya Rose	16	21	21
3	(Bulgaria) Gabriela Stoeva (Bulgaria) Stefani Stoeva	21	19	19
4	(Japan) Rui Hirokami (Japan) Yuna Kato	13	21	21
2	(France) Margot Lambert (France) Anne Tran	21	18	18

Final
6	(Indonesia) Meilysa Trias Puspita Sari (Indonesia) Rachel Allessya Rose	21	21
4	(Japan) Rui Hirokami (Japan) Yuna Kato	12	18

=== Top half ===
==== Section 1 ====
First round
1	(Indonesia) F D Kusuma (Indonesia) A C Pratiwi	21	21
PFQ	(Uganda) F Mohamed Rafi (Uganda) T Naluwooza	4	6
(China) Wang TG (China) Wang YD	13	21	21
Q3	(England) C Birch (England) Es van Leeuwen	21	12	17
6	(Indonesia) M T Puspita Sari (Indonesia) R A Rose	21	22
(India) S Singhi (India) R Thaker	9	20
(France) S Bauer (France) E Vercelot	21	21
(South Africa) A Ackerman (South Africa) D Laurens	18	15

Second round
1	(Indonesia) F D Kusuma (Indonesia) A C Pratiwi	19	10
(China) Wang TG (China) Wang YD	21	21
6	(Indonesia) M T Puspita Sari (Indonesia) R A Rose	21	21
(France) S Bauer (France) E Vercelot	7	11

Quarter-finals
(China) Wang TG (China) Wang YD	9	18
6	(Indonesia) M T Puspita Sari (Indonesia) R A Rose	21	21

==== Section 2 ====
First round
3	(Bulgaria) G Stoeva (Bulgaria) S Stoeva	21	22
(Scotland) J MacPherson (Scotland) C Torrance	8	20
Q4	(Chinese Taipei) Huang Y-h (Chinese Taipei) Liang T-y	21	8	21
(China) Keng SL (China) Zhang C	18	21	13
PFQ	(Poland) P Hankiewicz (Poland) K Marczak	17	22	15
(France) T Margueritte (France) F Vallet	21	20	21
(Brazil) J Lima (Brazil) S Lima	15	18
(Spain) P López (Spain) L Rodríguez	21	21

Second round
3	(Bulgaria) G Stoeva (Bulgaria) S Stoeva	21	21
Q4	(Chinese Taipei) Huang Y-h (Chinese Taipei) Liang T-y	16	14
(France) T Margueritte (France) F Vallet	19	21	12
(Spain) P López (Spain) L Rodríguez	21	17	21

Quarter-finals
3	(Bulgaria) G Stoeva (Bulgaria) S Stoeva	21	21
(Spain) P López (Spain) L Rodríguez	10	10

=== Bottom half ===
==== Section 3 ====
First round
(Denmark) A C Kudsk (Denmark) S Schulz	21	21
Q1	(France) E Jacob (France) C Pognante	9	14
(Austria) S Au Yeong (Austria) K Hochmeir	8	17
8	(Chinese Taipei) Chang C-h (Chinese Taipei) Yang C-t	21	21
(Chinese Taipei) Hsu Y-h (Chinese Taipei) Lin J-y	21	21
(India) P Konjengbam (India) S Mishra	13	13
Q2
4	(Japan) R Hirokami (Japan) Y Kato	w	/	o

Second round
(Denmark) A C Kudsk (Denmark) S Schulz	21	21
8	(Chinese Taipei) Chang C-h (Chinese Taipei) Yang C-t	14	14
(Chinese Taipei) Hsu Y-h (Chinese Taipei) Lin J-y	22	22	24
4	(Japan) R Hirokami (Japan) Y Kato	24	20	26

Quarter-finals
(Denmark) A C Kudsk (Denmark) S Schulz	8	17
4	(Japan) R Hirokami (Japan) Y Kato	21	21

==== Section 4 ====
First round
(Sweden) M Sjöö (Sweden) T Sjöö	21	21
(Uganda) H Kobugabe (Uganda) G Mbabazi	14	10
(Poland) A Khomich (Poland) D Zimnol	12	15
5	(Indonesia) L T Mayasari (Indonesia) R Sugiarto	21	21
(Denmark) J Finne-Ipsen (Denmark) M Surrow	17	21
(Denmark) N P Anthonisen (Netherlands) A Tirtosentono	21	23
(Germany) J Meyer (Germany) L Michalski	7	6
2	(France) M Lambert (France) A Tran	21	21

Second round
(Sweden) M Sjöö (Sweden) T Sjöö	15	20
5	(Indonesia) L T Mayasari (Indonesia) R Sugiarto	21	22
(Denmark) N P Anthonisen (Netherlands) A Tirtosentono	14	16
2	(France) M Lambert (France) A Tran	21	21

Quarter-finals
5	(Indonesia) L T Mayasari (Indonesia) R Sugiarto	13	17
2	(France) M Lambert (France) A Tran	21	21

== Mixed doubles ==
=== Seeds ===
1. (Indonesia) Rinov Rivaldy / Pitha Haningtyas Mentari (final)
2. (Germany) Mark Lamsfuß / Isabel Lohau (withdrew)
3. (Denmark) Mads Vestergaard / Christine Busch (semi-finals)
4. (Malaysia) Chan Peng Soon / Cheah Yee See (first round)
5. (Japan) Hiroki Nishi / Akari Sato (quarter-finals)
6. (Denmark) Jesper Toft / Clara Graversen (quarter-finals)
7. (Malaysia) Hoo Pang Ron / Cheng Su Yin (semi-finals)
8. (Germany) Jan Colin Völker / Stine Küspert (withdrew)

=== Finals ===
Semi-finals
1	(Indonesia) Rinov Rivaldy (Indonesia) Pitha Haningtyas Mentari	21	22
3	(Denmark) Mads Vestergaard (Denmark) Christine Busch	11	20
7	(Malaysia) Hoo Pang Ron (Malaysia) Cheng Su Yin	24	16	25
(China) Cheng Xing (China) Zhang Chi	22	21	27

Final
1	(Indonesia) Rinov Rivaldy (Indonesia) Pitha Haningtyas Mentari	21	18	15
(China) Cheng Xing (China) Zhang Chi	16	21	21

=== Top half ===
==== Section 1 ====
First round
1	(Indonesia) R Rivaldy (Indonesia) P H Mentari	21	21
(Brazil) D Silva (Brazil) S Lima	10	14
(Slovenia) M Ivančič (Slovenia) P Polanc	17	11
(Germany) M Bourakkadi (Germany) L Michalski	21	21
5	(Japan) H Nishi (Japan) A Sato	21	21
Q3	(Spain) R García (Spain) L Rodríguez	11	15
(Scotland) C Grimley (Scotland) J MacPherson	16	21	21
(Denmark) R Espersen (Denmark) A C Kudsk	21	19	13

Second round
1	(Indonesia) R Rivaldy (Indonesia) P H Mentari	21	21
(Germany) M Bourakkadi (Germany) L Michalski	13	16
5	(Japan) H Nishi (Japan) A Sato	14	21	21
(Scotland) C Grimley (Scotland) J MacPherson	21	16	18

Quarter-finals
1	(Indonesia) R Rivaldy (Indonesia) P H Mentari	21	21
5	(Japan) H Nishi (Japan) A Sato	17	11

==== Section 2 ====
First round
3	(Denmark) M Vestergaard (Denmark) C Busch	21	21
Q2	(Scotland) A Pringle (Scotland) R Andrew	19	19
Q1	(England) Et van Leeuwen (England) C Birch	11	19
(England) C Hemming (England) Es van Leeuwen	21	21
PFQ	(France) E Adam (France) S Bauer	11	16
(Chinese Taipei) Chen Z-r (Chinese Taipei) Yang C-t	21	21
(Netherlands) T van der Lecq (Netherlands) A Tirtosentono	21	19	16
(Chinese Taipei) Lu C (Chinese Taipei) Chang C-h	16	21	21

Second round
3	(Denmark) M Vestergaard (Denmark) C Busch	21	21
(England) C Hemming (England) Es van Leeuwen	14	8
(Chinese Taipei) Chen Z-r (Chinese Taipei) Yang C-t	19	21	19
(Chinese Taipei) Lu C (Chinese Taipei) Chang C-h	21	18	21

Quarter-finals
3	(Denmark) M Vestergaard (Denmark) C Busch	17	21	21
(Chinese Taipei) Lu C (Chinese Taipei) Chang C-h	21	19	14

=== Bottom half ===
==== Section 3 ====
First round
(India) B S Reddy (India) N S Reddy	21	19	17
Q4	(France) J Maio (France) L Palermo	17	21	21
(Germany) J R Jansen (Germany) T P Nguyen	20	12
7	(Malaysia) Hoo P R (Malaysia) Cheng S Y	22	21
(Germany) P Scheiel (Germany) F Volkmann	14	18
(India) S K Karunakaran (India) A Variyath	21	21
(Chinese Taipei) Chen C-k (Chinese Taipei) Hsu Y-h	22	20	21
4	(Malaysia) Chan P S (Malaysia) Cheah Y S	20	22	9

Second round
Q4	(France) J Maio (France) L Palermo	16	18
7	(Malaysia) Hoo P R (Malaysia) Cheng S Y	21	21
(India) S K Karunakaran (India) A Variyath	21	20	15
(Chinese Taipei) Chen C-k (Chinese Taipei) Hsu Y-h	12	22	21

Quarter-finals
7	(Malaysia) Hoo P R (Malaysia) Cheng S Y	21	21
(Chinese Taipei) Chen C-k (Chinese Taipei) Hsu Y-h	18	11

==== Section 4 ====
First round
(India) A Surya (India) A Pramuthesh	21	21
(Israel) M Zilberman (Israel) S Zilberman	12	16
(Malaysia) Ting S W (Malaysia) Gan J E	15	14
6	(Denmark) J Toft (Denmark) C Graversen	21	21
(China) Cheng X (China) Zhang C	16	21	21
(Chinese Taipei) Chen S-f (Chinese Taipei) Lin J-y	21	12	18
(Brazil) F Farias (Brazil) J Lima	13	21	21
PFQ	(France) L Renoir (France) T Margueritte	21	19	19

Second round
(India) A Surya (India) A Pramuthesh	12	13
6	(Denmark) J Toft (Denmark) C Graversen	21	21
(China) Cheng X (China) Zhang C	21	21
(Brazil) F Farias (Brazil) J Lima	15	12

Quarter-finals
6	(Denmark) J Toft (Denmark) C Graversen	20	21	13
(China) Cheng X (China) Zhang C	22	17	21

Preceded by 2024 French Open	BWF World Tour; 2024 BWF season	Succeeded by 2024 Swiss Open; 2024 Ruichang China Masters
