= Yushi Tanaka =

Japanese badminton player (born 1999)

Yūshi Tanaka
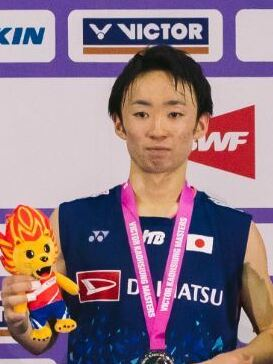
- Tanaka in 2023

Personal information
- Native name: 田中 湧士
- Born: 5 October 1999 (age 27) Kikuchi, Kumamoto, Japan
- Height: 1.70 m (5 ft 7 in)

Sport
- Country: Japan
- Sport: Badminton
- Handedness: Right
- Coached by: Kento Momota (NTT East); Sho Sasaki (BAJ)

Men's singles
- Career record: 134 wins, 70 losses (65.69%)
- Highest ranking: 16 (17 November 2026)
- Current ranking: 16 (17 November 2026)
- BWF profile
Medal record
Men's badminton
Representing Japan
Asia Team Championships
Gold medal – first place	2026 Qingdao	Men's team
Asia Mixed Team Championships
Bronze medal – third place	2025 Qingdao	Mixed team

Yushi Tanaka (田中 湧士, Tanaka Yūshi; born 5 October 1999) is a Japanese badminton player who competes in the men's singles event. He achieved a career-high world ranking of No. 16. Hailing from Kikuchi, Kumamoto, he is a member of the Japan national team and plays for the NTT East Badminton Team since graduating from Nihon University in April 2022. In 2024, Tanaka won his first BWF World Tour title at the Super 300 Orléans Masters. He subsequently won two additional Super 300 titles, the 2024 U.S. Open and the 2026 Swiss Open, and finished as the runner-up at the 2025 Australian Open (Super 500). Representing Japan, Tanaka was part of the squad that won the country's first men's team gold medal at the 2026 Asia Team Championships. Domestically, he is a two-time men's singles champion at the All Japan Championships, winning the title in 2021 and 2024.

== Career ==
=== 2020–2021: International debut and first titles ===
Tanaka made his senior international debut in 2020 and was selected for the Japanese national team for the first time, notably without having competed on the international junior circuit. That year, he won his first international title at the Peru Future Series and finished as the runner-up at the Jamaica International, facing compatriot Takuma Obayashi in both finals. Although the COVID-19 pandemic curtailed his 2021 international season, Tanaka won his first All Japan Championships title. In the final, he defeated pre-tournament favorite Kodai Naraoka.

=== 2022: Two International Challenge titles and world's top 100 ===
In 2022, Tanaka secured two international titles and broke into the world's top 100 for the first time. He won the Polish International, defeating Jan Louda, and the North Harbour International, where he overcame Riku Hatano. He also finished as the runner-up to Hatano at the Réunion Open. Earlier in the year, after graduating from Nihon University, Tanaka joined the NTT East Badminton Team in April. By the end of the year, his performances propelled him to a world ranking of No. 91.

=== 2023–2024: Two Super 300 titles and top-30 ranking ===
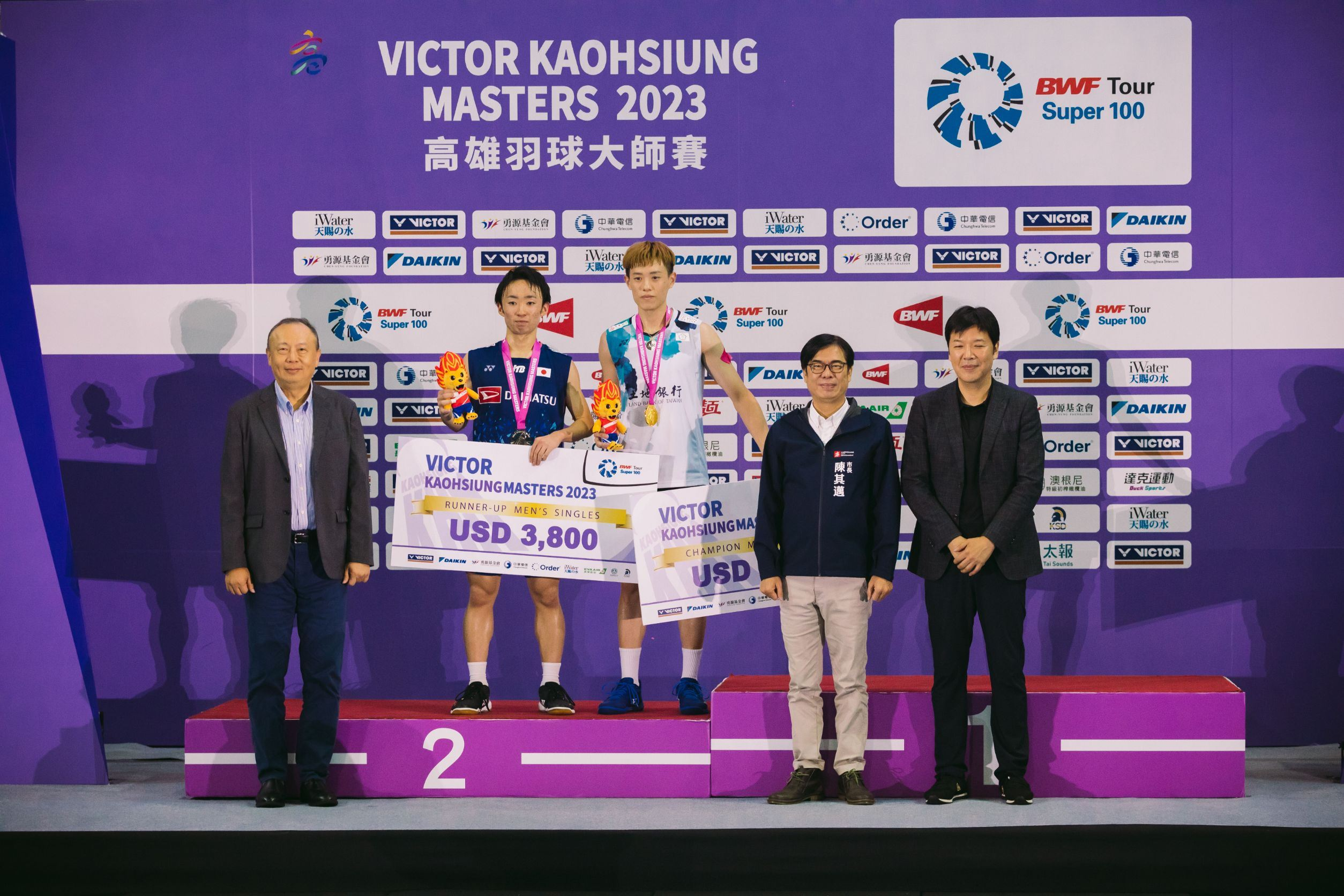
Tanaka (left) on the podium as the runner-up at the 2023 Kaohsiung Masters.

In 2023, Tanaka finished as the runner-up at the Super 100 Kaohsiung Masters, where he lost to Lin Chun-yi. He also won the Estonian International, where he defeated Alex Lanier, and the Osaka International, where he defeated Alwi Farhan. Following these results, Tanaka achieved a career-high world ranking of No. 41 in October.

In 2024, Tanaka won two Super 300 titles. He won his first BWF World Tour title at the Orléans Masters, defeating compatriot Koo Takahashi, followed by the U.S. Open title, where he defeated Lei Lanxi. He also won the Denmark Challenge, where he defeated Lanier. Over the course of the year, his world ranking rose from No. 56 to a new career high of No. 27.

Nationally, Tanaka won the Japan Ranking Circuit and claimed his second All Japan Championships title after defeating top seed Kodai Naraoka in the semifinal. Both victories came under the guidance of two-time world champion Kento Momota.

=== 2025: World Championships debut and Australian Open runner-up ===
In February, Tanaka contributed to the bronze medal win at the Asia Mixed Team Championships. On the BWF World Tour, at the Super 1000 All England Open in March, he defeated eighth-seed Kodai Naraoka in the opening round. He later reached the semifinals of the Super 500 Malaysia Masters in May, where he was defeated by Srikanth Kidambi. Following a second-round appearance at the Super 1000 Indonesia Open, Tanaka achieved a career-high world ranking of No. 19 on 24 June.

In August, Tanaka made his World Championships debut, upsetting world No. 4 Li Shifeng in the first round before being eliminated in the second round. He concluded the season with a runner-up finish at the Super 500 Australian Open in November. During the tournament, Tanaka eliminated top seed Jonatan Christie and Lin Chun-yi to reach the final, where he lost to Lakshya Sen.

=== 2026: Historic team title and Swiss Open champion ===
Tanaka began the season at the Malaysia Open, where he was eliminated in the first round. He was part of the Japanese team that won Japan's first men's team title at the Asia Team Championships. In the final against China, he defeated Hu Zhe'an in straight games. He won his first title of the year in the Swiss Open against Alwi Farhan. In April, Tanaka competed at the Asian Championships in Ningbo, China. He defeated Jeon Hyeok-jin in the first round before being eliminated in the second round by Kunlavut Vitidsarn. In July, Tanaka reached his first Super 750 semifinal at the Japan Open. In the opening round, he defeated the eighth seed, Li Shifeng, securing his second consecutive victory over the player. He then advanced to the semifinals by upsetting world No. 2 Kunlavut Vitidsarn in the quarterfinals.

In October, Tanaka reached the final of the Super 500 Arctic Open. In the quarterfinals, he upset world No. 1 and top seed Kunlavut Vitidsarn of Thailand in three games. He subsequently defeated compatriot Koki Watanabe in the semifinals before finishing as runner-up to Denmark's Anders Antonsen, losing a closely contested final 21–16, 16–21, 25–27.

== Playing style ==
Tanaka has described his playing style as attacking, relying on speed and a determination to retrieve every shuttle. His motto, "one last push after getting tired," reflects his determination to keep the shuttle in play.

Two-time world champion Kento Momota has described Tanaka as exceptionally fast, rating his movement into the rear court as world-class. Momota also noted the sharpness of Tanaka's strokes, his defensive ability, and his capacity to establish an attacking rhythm while remaining patient during rallies. Jonatan Christie similarly praised Tanaka's movement, technique, and shot quality, observing that his style compares favourably with that of other Japanese players. Christie also highlighted the accuracy of Tanaka's attacking and defensive play, as well as his patience during rallies.

Momota also observed that Tanaka's eagerness during matches could lead to unforced errors. Tanaka acknowledged this, stating that he sometimes focused too heavily on imposing his own game rather than adapting to his opponent. He identified reducing errors, improving tactical awareness, and refining his technique as areas for development.

== Endorsements ==
In December 2025, Tanaka entered into a support agreement with Japanese company Alles Inc., which agreed to provide products from its Colovany conditioning brand to support his athletic activities.

== Personal life ==
Tanaka married on 5 February 2025.

== Achievements ==
=== BWF World Tour (3 titles, 3 runners-up) ===
The BWF World Tour, which was announced on 19 March 2017 and implemented in 2018, is a series of elite badminton tournaments sanctioned by the Badminton World Federation (BWF). The BWF World Tours are divided into levels of World Tour Finals, Super 1000, Super 750, Super 500, Super 300 (part of the HSBC World Tour), and the BWF Tour Super 100.

Men's singles
Year	Tournament	Level	Opponent	Score	Result	Ref.
2023	Kaohsiung Masters	Super 100	(Chinese Taipei) Lin Chun-yi	21–11, 17–21, 14–21	(silver) Runner-up	
2024	Orléans Masters	Super 300	(Japan) Koo Takahashi	21–18, 21–10	(gold) Winner	
2024	U.S. Open	Super 300	(China) Lei Lanxi	15–21, 21–18, 21–15	(gold) Winner	
2025	Australian Open	Super 500	(India) Lakshya Sen	15–21, 11–21	(silver) Runner-up	
2026	Swiss Open	Super 300	(Indonesia) Alwi Farhan	21–18, 21–12	(gold) Winner	
2026	Arctic Open	Super 500	(Denmark) Anders Antonsen	21–16, 16–21, 25–27	(silver) Runner-up	

=== BWF International Challenge/Series (6 titles, 2 runners-up) ===
Men's singles
Year	Tournament	Opponent	Score	Result	Ref.
2020	Jamaica International	(Japan) Takuma Obayashi	11–21, 21–17, 12–21	(silver) Runner-up	
2020	Peru Future Series	(Japan) Takuma Obayashi	21–13, 8–21, 21–18	(gold) Winner	
2022	Réunion Open	(Japan) Riku Hatano	16–21, 17–21	(silver) Runner-up	
2022	Polish International	(Czech Republic) Jan Louda	21–13, 21–15	(gold) Winner	
2022	North Harbour International	(Japan) Riku Hatano	21–13, 21–18	(gold) Winner	
2023	Estonian International	(France) Alex Lanier	21–13, 15–21, 21–12	(gold) Winner	
2023	Osaka International	(Indonesia) Alwi Farhan	15–21, 21–14, 21–17	(gold) Winner	
2024	Denmark Challenge	(France) Alex Lanier	15–21, 21–12, 21–11	(gold) Winner	

BWF International Challenge tournament
BWF International Series tournament
BWF Future Series tournament

== Performance timeline ==
Key

W	Won	F	Finalist	SF	Semi-finalist
QF	Quarter-finalist	#R	Rounds 4, 3, 2, 1	RR	Round-robin stage
Q#	Qualification round	A	Absent	w/d	Withdrew
G	Gold	S	Silver	B	Bronze
NH	Not held	N/A	Not applicable	DNQ	Did not qualify

=== National team ===
Team events	2025	2026	Ref.
Asia Mixed Team Championships	B	NH	
Asia Team Championships	NH	G	
Asian Games	NH	5th	
Thomas Cup	NH	5th	

=== Individual competitions ===
Men's singles

Event	2025	2026	Ref.
Asian Championships	2R	2R	
World Championships	2R	3R	

Tournament	BWF World Tour				Best	Ref.
Tournament	2023	2024	2025	2026	Best	Ref.
Malaysia Open	A		2R	1R	2R ('25)	
India Open	A		1R	1R	1R ('25, '26)	
Indonesia Masters	A		1R	QF	QF ('26)	
All England Open	A		2R	1R	2R ('25)	
Swiss Open	A	1R	2R	W	W ('26)	
Orléans Masters	A	W	2R	2R	W ('24)	
Thailand Open	A		1R	2R	2R ('26)	
Baoji China Masters	N/A	SF	A		SF ('24)	
Malaysia Masters	A		SF	A	SF ('25)	
Singapore Open	A		1R	1R	1R ('25, '26)	
Indonesia Open	A		2R	QF	QF ('26)	
Australian Open	A		F	2R	F ('25)	
U.S. Open	2R	W	A		W ('24)	
Canada Open	A	SF	A		SF ('24)	
Japan Open	A	QF	1R	SF	SF ('26)	
China Open	A	1R	1R	1R	1R ('24, '25, '26)	
Korea Masters	2R	A			2R ('23)	
China Masters	A	1R	1R	1R	1R ('24, '25, '26)	
Indonesia Masters Super 100	SF	A			SF ('23)	
Indonesia Masters Super 100	QF	A			SF ('23)	
Vietnam Open	3R	A			3R ('23)	
Arctic Open	A	2R	2R	F	F ('26)	
Denmark Open	A	1R	2R	1R	2R ('25)	
French Open	A		1R	1R	1R ('25, '26)	
Korea Open	A	1R	1R	2R	2R ('26)	
Japan Masters	A	1R	2R	QF	QF ('26)	
Kaohsiung Masters	F	A			F ('23)	
Hong Kong Open	A	1R	1R	A	1R ('24, '25)	
Spain Masters	A	QF	NH		QF ('24)	
Year-end ranking	56	27	19		19	
Tournament	2023	2024	2025	2026	Best	Ref.

== Wins over top-10 ranked players ==
Wins over players who were ranked in the world's top 10 at the time the match was played.

#	Opponent	Rk	Tournament	Rd	Score	Rk	Ref.
1	(Indonesia) Anthony Sinisuka Ginting	9	2024 Japan Open	1R	21–17, 5–4 retired	31	
2	(Japan) Kodai Naraoka	8	2025 All England Open	1R	21–13, 15–21, 21–9	26	
3	(China) Li Shifeng	4	2025 World Championships	1R	19–21, 21–11, 21–15	27	
4	(Indonesia) Jonatan Christie	4	2025 Australian Open	1R	21–17, 21–7	26	
5	(China) Shi Yuqi	1	2026 Indonesia Open	2R	21–16, 21–11	21	
6	(China) Li Shifeng	8	2026 Japan Open	1R	21–17, 19–21, 21–15	22	
7	(Thailand) Kunlavut Vitidsarn	2	2026 Japan Open	QF	20–22, 21–16, 21–18	22	
8	(Thailand) Kunlavut Vitidsarn	1	2026 Arctic Open	QF	14–21, 21–13, 21–16	18	
9	(Canada) Victor Lai	4	2026 Japan Masters	2R	21–16, 21–19	17	

== Record against selected opponents ==
Record against Year-end Finals finalists, World Championships semi-finalists, and Olympic quarter-finalists. Accurate as of 14 November 2026.

Player	M	W	L	Diff.
(Canada) Victor Lai	2	1	1	0
(China) Shi Yuqi	4	1	3	–2
(Chinese Taipei) Chou Tien-chen	4	0	4	–4
(Denmark) Anders Antonsen	4	0	4	–4
(Denmark) Viktor Axelsen	2	0	2	–2
(France) Alex Lanier	4	3	1	+2
(France) Christo Popov	2	1	1	0
(Guatemala) Kevin Cordón	1	1	0	+1

Player	M	W	L	Diff.
(India) Srikanth Kidambi	2	1	1	0
(India) Prannoy H. S.	2	2	0	+2
(India) Lakshya Sen	3	0	3	–3
(Indonesia) Anthony Sinisuka Ginting	3	2	1	+1
(Japan) Kodai Naraoka	2	1	1	0
(Malaysia) Lee Zii Jia	1	0	1	–1
(Singapore) Loh Kean Yew	1	0	1	–1
(Thailand) Kunlavut Vitidsarn	5	2	3	–1
