= Li Shifeng =

Chinese badminton player

Li Shifeng 李诗沣
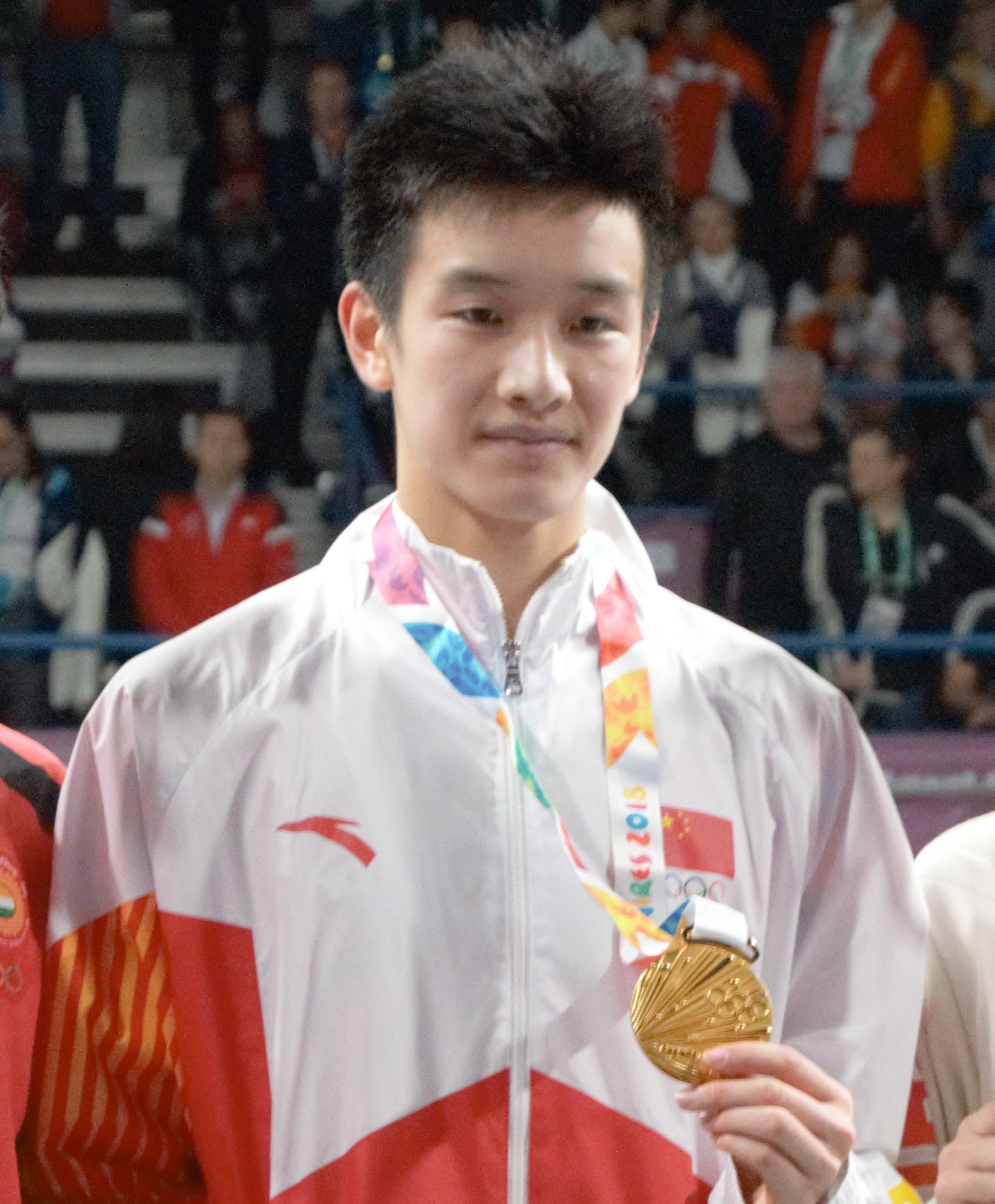
- Li with his gold medal of the 2018 Summer Youth Olympics

Personal information
- Born: 9 January 2000 (age 26) Nanchang, Jiangxi, China
- Height: 1.85 m (6 ft 1 in)

Sport
- Country: China
- Sport: Badminton
- Handedness: Right

Men's singles
- Career record: 218 wins, 84 losses
- Highest ranking: 3 (31 October 2023)
- Current ranking: 17 (17 November 2026)
- BWF profile
Medal record
Men's badminton
Representing China
Sudirman Cup
Gold medal – first place	2021 Vantaa	Mixed team
Gold medal – first place	2023 Suzhou	Mixed team
Gold medal – first place	2025 Xiamen	Mixed team
Thomas Cup
Gold medal – first place	2024 Chengdu	Men's team
Gold medal – first place	2026 Horsens	Men's team
Silver medal – second place	2020 Aarhus	Men's team
Asian Games
Gold medal – first place	2022 Hangzhou	Men's singles
Gold medal – first place	2022 Hangzhou	Men's team
Silver medal – second place	2026 Aichi–Nagoya	Men's team
Asian Championships
Silver medal – second place	2024 Ningbo	Men's singles
Bronze medal – third place	2025 Ningbo	Men's singles
Youth Olympic Games
Gold medal – first place	2018 Buenos Aires	Boys' singles
World Junior Championships
Gold medal – first place	2017 Yogyakarta	Mixed team
Gold medal – first place	2018 Markham	Mixed team
Bronze medal – third place	2018 Markham	Boys' singles
Asian Junior Championships
Gold medal – first place	2018 Jakarta	Mixed team

Li Shifeng (Chinese: 李诗沣; pinyin: Lǐ Shīfēng; born 9 January 2000) is a Chinese badminton player. He is a gold medallist in the men's singles at the 2022 Asian Games. He was part of the winning Chinese team at the 2021, 2023, and 2025 Sudirman Cup; 2022 Asian Games, and also at the 2024 and 2026 Thomas Cup. Li reached a career high as world number 3 in the BWF World rankings on 31 October 2023. Li is the 2018 Olympic Youth boys' singles gold medallist competing at the 2018 Summer Youth Olympics in Buenos Aires, Argentina.

He was part of the Chinese junior team that won the gold medals at the 2017, 2018 World Junior Championships, and 2018 Asian Junior Championships.

== Early life ==
Li began playing badminton at the age of 6 with support from his father. Li then practiced in the Jiangxi team when he was in the elementary school. When Li was 12, he visited Fuzhou's Bayi team, eventually joining and training with them. He subsequently finished as a runner up at a national competition. At the age of 14, he participated in the National youth team training centre in Shenyang and entered the National second team in 2017.

From a young age, he was noted to display exceptional skill and determination on court, quickly rising through the ranks in China's competitive youth badminton scene, emerging as one of China's brightest badminton talents at the time. Whilst growing up and training, he stated that both Lin Dan and Lee Chong Wei were his idols whilst expressing deep admiration for Japan's Kento Momota. Li said that he had a desire to incorporate their playing styles into his gameplay.

== Career ==
=== 2024 ===
Li started off the 2024 season poorly, he participated in the 2024 Malaysia Open, beating Lee Chia-hao and Weng Hongyang in three games. However, he lost in the quarter-finals to Lin Chun-yi. He subsequently suffered multiple first and second round exits to Koki Watanabe at the India Open, Brian Yang at the Indonesia Masters, Lakshya Sen at the French Open and Toma Junior Popov at the All England Open.

Li found more success during the Asian Championships, reaching the final, but losing to Indonesia's Jonatan Christie in straight games, marking Li's first medal in this competition. He would go on to participate in the 2024 edition of the Thomas Cup, as China's second men's singles choice. He found some more success during the Thomas Cup, however, he lost to Lakshya Sen during the quarter-finals and Jonatan Christie during the finals. China would still eventually win the Thomas cup that year, marking Li's first Thomas Cup gold medal.

Li participated in the Malaysia Masters, avenging his defeat by Toma Junior Popov but ultimately losing in the quarter-finals to Ng Ka Long. At the Singapore Open, he reached his first final of 2024 beating Lei Lanxi, Lee Cheuk Yiu and Loh Kean Yew along with a semi-finals walkover from Viktor Axelsen. He lost the final to his compatriot Shi Yuqi. He would lose again to Shi Yuqi in the semi-finals of the Indonesia Open, who eventually won the tournament.

At the 2024 Olympic Games, Li was eliminated by Loh Kean Yew in the knockout stages. What followed this was a string of first, second and quarter-final round exits, losing at the Korea Open to Lee Chia-hao, China Open to Chou Tien-chen, Arctic Open to Lee Cheuk Yiu, Denmark Open to Anders Antonsen. His title drought of 2024 came to an end, winning the Japan Masters, comfortably beating 1st seed and reigning Olympic champion Viktor Axelsen in the semi-finals and Lee Chia-hao in the finals. He lost to Lin Chun-yi at the China Masters in the first round.

Li qualified for the 2024 World Tour Finals, where he would lose to Anders Antonsen in his first group stage match, but go on to beat Chou Tien-chen in three games and Lee Zii Jia by retirement. Ultimately this was not enough to advance into the knockout stages, thus ending the 2024 season for Li.

=== 2025–2026 ===
Li started off the 2025 season at the Malaysia Open. He reached the semi-finals before subsequently being beaten by the eventual champion Shi Yuqi in three games. Li then suffered a first round defeat to Malaysia's Leong Jun Hao marking his first ever loss to Leong. Li subsequently suffered a quarter-finals exit to Taiwan's Wang Tzu-wei at the Indonesia Masters.

After taking a 2-month break, he entered the 2025 edition of the All England Open. Competing as the 2023 former champion he reached the semi finals, having beaten his youth rival Lakshya Sen in two games, however he lost to his compatriot Shi Yuqi once again in three games. Li lost in the semi-finals at the Swiss Open to Christo Popov in two straight games. he then won a bronze medal at the Asian Championships, losing in the semi-finals to Lu Guangzu, marking his second medal at the Asia Championships.

Li won the Malaysia Masters, defeating all of his opponents in two games, and dominating India's Srikanth Kidambi with scores of 21-11 and 21–9, marking his first title of the season, and subsequently becoming the first Chinese men's singles player to win a title in the Malaysia Masters since its inception in 2009.

Li claimed his second title of the year at the 2025 Hong Kong Open, comfortably defeating Lakshya Sen in two straight games of 21-15 and 21-12.

In 2026, Li helps the Chinese team to win the 2026 Thomas Cup. He then won his first title of the year by retain the Malaysia Masters title.

== Achievements ==
=== Asian Games ===
Men's singles
Year	Venue	Opponent	Score	Result	Ref.
2022	Binjiang Gymnasium; Hangzhou, China	(China) Shi Yuqi	23–21, 21–13	Gold	

=== Asian Championships ===
Men's singles
Year	Venue	Opponent	Score	Result	Ref.
2024	Ningbo Olympic Sports Center Gymnasium; Ningbo, China	(Indonesia) Jonatan Christie	15–21, 16–21	Silver	
2025	Ningbo Olympic Sports Center Gymnasium, Ningbo, China	(China) Lu Guangzu	21–19, 10–21, 14–21	Bronze	

=== Youth Olympic Games ===
Boys' singles
Year	Venue	Opponent	Score	Result	Ref.
2018	Tecnópolis; Buenos Aires, Argentina	(India) Lakshya Sen	21–15, 21–19	Gold	

=== World Junior Championships ===
Boys' singles
Year	Venue	Opponent	Score	Result	Ref.
2018	Markham Pan Am Centre; Markham, Canada	(Japan) Kodai Naraoka	11–21, 21–19, 17–21	Bronze	

=== World Tour (7 titles, 5 runners-up) ===
The BWF World Tour, which was announced on 19 March 2017 and implemented in 2018, is a series of elite badminton tournaments sanctioned by the Badminton World Federation (BWF). The BWF World Tour is divided into levels of World Tour Finals, Super 1000, Super 750, Super 500, Super 300, and the BWF Tour Super 100.

Men's singles
Year	Tournament	Level	Opponent	Score	Result	Ref.
2019	Canada Open	Super 100	(India) Parupalli Kashyap	20–22, 21–14, 21–17	(gold) Winner	
2022	Thailand Open	Super 500	(Malaysia) Lee Zii Jia	21–17, 11–21, 21–23	(silver) Runner-up	
2023	German Open	Super 300	(Hong Kong) Ng Ka Long	22–20, 18–21, 18–21	(silver) Runner-up	
2023	All England Open	Super 1000	(China) Shi Yuqi	26–24, 21–5	(gold) Winner	
2023	Canada Open	Super 500	(India) Lakshya Sen	18–21, 20–22	(silver) Runner-up	
2023	U.S. Open	Super 300	(Thailand) Kunlavut Vitidsarn	21–15, 21–18	(gold) Winner	
2023	French Open	Super 750	(Indonesia) Jonatan Christie	21–16, 15–21, 14–21	(silver) Runner-up	
2024	Singapore Open	Super 750	(China) Shi Yuqi	21–17, 19–21, 19–21	(silver) Runner-up	
2024	Japan Masters	Super 500	(Malaysia) Leong Jun Hao	21–10, 21–13	(gold) Winner	
2025	Malaysia Masters	Super 500	(India) Srikanth Kidambi	21–11, 21–9	(gold) Winner	
2025	Hong Kong Open	Super 500	(India) Lakshya Sen	21–15, 21–12	(gold) Winner	
2026	Malaysia Masters	Super 500	(Thailand) Panitchaphon Teeraratsakul	21–16, 21–17	(gold) Winner	

=== International Challenge / Series (2 runners-up) ===
Men's singles
Year	Tournament	Opponent	Score	Result	Ref.
2019	Austrian Open	(Netherlands) Mark Caljouw	21–8, 21–23, 9–21	(silver) Runner-up	
2019	Iran Fajr International	(Thailand) Kunlavut Vitidsarn	18–21, 17–21	(silver) Runner-up	

BWF International Challenge tournament
BWF International Series tournament
BWF Future Series tournament

=== Junior International (3 runners-up) ===
Boys' singles
Year	Tournament	Opponent	Score	Result
2017	Korea Junior International	(China) Bai Yupeng	16–21, 13–21	(silver) Runner-up
2018	Dutch Junior International	(Thailand) Kunlavut Vitidsarn	18–21, 14–21	(silver) Runner-up
2018	German Junior International	(Thailand) Kunlavut Vitidsarn	15–21, 11–21	(silver) Runner-up

BWF Junior International Grand Prix tournament
BWF Junior International Challenge tournament
BWF Junior International Series tournament
BWF Junior Future Series tournament

== Record against selected opponents ==
Record against Year-end Finals finalists, World Championships semi-finalists, and Olympic quarter-finalists. Accurate as of 3 March 2026.

Player	Matches	Win	Lost	Diff
(Canada) Victor Lai	1	1	0	+1
(China) Shi Yuqi	8	2	6	–4
(Chinese Taipei) Chou Tien-Chen	5	2	3	–1
(Denmark) Viktor Axelsen	1	1	0	+1
(Denmark) Anders Antonsen	6	2	4	–2
(Denmark) Hans-Kristian Vittinghus	2	2	0	+2
(France) Christo Popov	4	3	1	+2
(India) Srikanth Kidambi	5	4	1	+3
(India) B. Sai Praneeth	3	3	0	+3
(India) Prannoy H. S.	5	2	3	–1
(India) Lakshya Sen	16	8	8	0

Player	Matches	Win	Lost	Diff
(Indonesia) Anthony Sinisuka Ginting	7	3	4	–1
(Indonesia) Tommy Sugiarto	1	1	0	+1
(Japan) Kento Momota	1	1	0	+1
(Japan) Kodai Naraoka	10	6	4	+2
(Malaysia) Lee Zii Jia	6	4	2	+2
(Malaysia) Liew Daren	1	1	0	+1
(Singapore) Loh Kean Yew	7	2	5	–3
(South Korea) Son Wan-ho	1	1	0	+1
(Thailand) Kunlavut Vitidsarn	11	6	5	+1
(Thailand) Kantaphon Wangcharoen	7	6	1	+5
