= Koo Takahashi =

Japanese badminton player (born 2001)

Personal information
- Born: 20 September 2001 (age 25) Fukuoka Prefecture, Japan
- Height: 1.69 m (5 ft 7 in)
- Weight: 58 kg (128 lb)

Sport
- Country: Japan
- Sport: Badminton
- Handedness: Right

Men's singles
- Career record: 87 wins, 50 losses (63.50%)
- Highest ranking: 40 (4 March 2025)
- Current ranking: 159 (3 November 2026)
- BWF profile

Koo Takahashi (高橋 洸士, Takahashi Kō; born 20 September 2001) is a Japanese badminton player. He is from Fukuoka prefecture and a former member of the Japan national team. He joined Tonami Transportation team on 1 April 2020.

== Career ==
=== 2022–2024 ===
Takahashi represented Japan at the 2022 Asia Team Championships, where the team was eliminated in the group stage. Later that year, he reached his first international final at the 2022 Santo Domingo Open, an International Series event, where he finished as the runner-up.

In 2023, Takahashi reached the quarterfinals of both the U.S. Open and the Vietnam Open. He also advanced to his first BWF World Tour final at the 2023 Indonesia Masters Super 100 I, finishing as the runner-up to India's Kiran George.

In 2024, Takahashi reached the final of the Super 300 Orléans Masters, finishing as the runner-up to compatriot Yushi Tanaka. Later in the year, he claimed his first international title by winning the Indonesia International, defeating fellow Japanese player Riku Hatano.

=== 2025–present ===
Takahashi reached a career-high world ranking of 40 on 4 March 2025. Early in the 2025 season, he reached the semifinals of the Super 300 German Open. During the tournament, he defeated fourth seed Christo Popov in the second round before losing to Loh Kean Yew.

== Achievements ==
=== BWF World Tour (2 runners-up) ===
The BWF World Tour, which was announced on 19 March 2017 and implemented in 2018, is a series of elite badminton tournaments sanctioned by the Badminton World Federation (BWF). The BWF World Tours are divided into levels of World Tour Finals, Super 1000, Super 750, Super 500, Super 300 (part of the HSBC World Tour), and the BWF Tour Super 100.

Men's singles
Year	Tournament	Level	Opponent	Score	Result	Ref.
2023 (I)	Indonesia Masters	Super 100	(India) Kiran George	19–21, 20–22	(silver) Runner-up	
2024	Orléans Masters	Super 300	(Japan) Yushi Tanaka	18–21, 10–21	(silver) Runner-up	

=== BWF International Challenge/Series (1 title, 2 runners-up) ===
Men's singles
Year	Tournament	Opponent	Score	Result	Ref.
2022	Santo Domingo Open	(Israel) Misha Zilberman	16–21, 15–21	(silver) Runner-up	
2024 (II)	Indonesia International	(Japan) Riku Hatano	21–18, 21–11	(gold) Winner	
2026	Northern Marianas Open	(South Korea) Park Sang-yong	19–21, 21–19, 15–21	(silver) Runner-up	

BWF International Challenge tournament
BWF International Series tournament

== Performance timeline ==
Key

W	Won	F	Finalist	SF	Semi-finalist
QF	Quarter-finalist	#R	Rounds 4, 3, 2, 1	RR	Round-robin stage
Q#	Qualification round	A	Absent	w/d	Withdrew
G	Gold	S	Silver	B	Bronze
NH	Not held	N/A	Not applicable	DNQ	Did not qualify

=== National team ===
Team events	2022	Ref
Asia Team Championships	5th	

=== Individual competitions ===
Tournament	BWF World Tour				Best	Ref
Tournament	2023	2024	2025	2026	Best	Ref
German Open	A		SF	A	SF ('25)	
Swiss Open	A	Q1	1R	A	1R ('25)	
Ruichang China Masters	A			3R	3R ('26)	
Orléans Masters	A	F	1R	A	F ('24)	
Thailand Open	A	1R	Q2	A	1R ('24)	
Baoji China Masters	A			2R	2R ('26)	
Malaysia Masters	A	2R	A		2R ('24)	
Macau Open	NH	QF	A		QF ('24)	
U.S. Open	QF	1R	A		QF ('23)	
Canada Open	A	1R	1R	Q2	1R ('24, '25)	
Japan Open	A	2R	A		2R ('24)	
Taipei Open	A		1R	A	1R ('25)	
Korea Masters	1R	1R	1R	A	1R ('23, '24, '25)	
Indonesia Masters Super 100	F	A	3R	A	F ('23)	
Indonesia Masters Super 100	QF	A	2R	A	F ('23)	
Vietnam Open	QF	A			QF ('23)	
Arctic Open	A		1R	A	1R ('25)	
Malaysia Super 100	A	SF	1R	A	SF ('24)	
Korea Open	A	1R	A		1R ('24)	
Japan Masters	Q2	1R	Q1	A	1R ('24)	
Kaohsiung Masters	1R	A	2R	1R	2R ('25)	
Syed Modi International	A			Q	('26)	
Spain Masters	A	2R	NH		2R ('24)	
Year-end ranking	65	44	91		44	
Tournament	2023	2024	2025	2026	Best	Ref

== Record against selected opponents ==
Record against Year-end Finals finalists, World Championships semi-finalists, and Olympic quarter-finalists. Accurate as of 23 December 2025.

Player	M	W	L	Diff.
(Chinese Taipei) Chou Tien-chen	1	0	1	–1
(France) Christo Popov	2	2	0	+2
(India) Srikanth Kidambi	2	1	1	0
(India) Parupalli Kashyap	1	1	0	+1

Player	M	W	L	Diff.
(Japan) Kodai Naraoka	2	0	2	–2
(Singapore) Loh Kean Yew	1	0	1	–1
(Thailand) Kantaphon Wangcharoen	1	0	1	–1
