= 2023 U.S. Open (badminton) =

Badminton championships

Tournament details
- Dates: 11–16 July
- Level: Super 300
- Total prize money: US$210,000
- Venue: Mid-America Center
- Location: Council Bluffs, Iowa, United States

Champions
- Men's singles: (China) Li Shifeng
- Women's singles: (Thailand) Supanida Katethong
- Men's doubles: (Malaysia) Goh Sze Fei (Malaysia) Nur Izzuddin
- Women's doubles: (China) Liu Shengshu (China) Tan Ning
- Mixed doubles: (Chinese Taipei) Ye Hong-wei (Chinese Taipei) Lee Chia-hsin

The 2023 U.S. Open (officially known as the Yonex US Open 2023 for sponsorship reasons) was a badminton tournament which took place at Council Bluffs, Iowa, United States, from 11 to 16 July 2023 and had a total purse of $210,000.

== Tournament ==
The 2023 U.S. Open is the sixteenth tournament of the 2023 BWF World Tour and is also a part of the U.S. Open championships which has been held since 1954. This tournament is organized by the USA Badminton and sanctioned by the BWF.

=== Venue ===
This international tournament is going to be held at Council Bluffs, Iowa, United States.

=== Point distribution ===
Below is the point distribution table for each phase of the tournament based on the BWF points system for the BWF World Tour Super 300 event.

Winner	Runner-up	3/4	5/8	9/16	17/32	33/64	65/128
7,000	5,950	4,900	3,850	2,750	1,670	660	320

=== Prize money ===
The total prize money for this tournament was US$210,000. Distribution of prize money was in accordance with BWF regulations.

Event	Winner	Finals	Semi-finals	Quarter-finals	Last 16
Singles	$15,750	$7,980	$3,045	$1,260	$735
Doubles	$16,590	$7,980	$2,940	$1,522.50	$787.50

== Men's singles ==
=== Seeds ===
1. (Thailand) Kunlavut Vitidsarn (Final)
2. (China) Li Shifeng (Champion)
3. (India) Lakshya Sen (Semi-finals)
4. (Chinese Taipei) Lin Chun-yi (Semi-finals)
5. (China) Weng Hongyang (Second round)
6. (Canada) Brian Yang (First round)
7. (Thailand) Kantaphon Wangcharoen (First round)
8. (Republic of Ireland) Nhat Nguyen (First round)

=== Finals ===
Semi-finals
1	(Thailand) Kunlavut Vitidsarn	21	21
4	(Chinese Taipei) Lin Chun-yi	14	17
3	(India) Lakshya Sen	17	24	17
2	(China) Li Shifeng	21	22	21

Final
1	(Thailand) Kunlavut Vitidsarn	15	18
2	(China) Li Shifeng	21	21

=== Top half ===
==== Section 1 ====
First round
1	(Thailand) K Vitidsarn	16	21	21
(Brazil) Y Coelho	21	13	16
(Spain) L E Peñalver	15	12
(Denmark) M Christophersen	21	21
7	(Thailand) K Wangcharoen	15	8
(Japan) T Obayashi	21	21
(Japan) R Hatano	10	13
(Denmark) M Johannesen	21	21

Second round
1	(Thailand) K Vitidsarn	21	21
(Denmark) M Christophersen	12	11
(Japan) T Obayashi	21	21
(Denmark) M Johannesen	18	9

Quarter-finals
1	(Thailand) K Vitidsarn	21	21
(Japan) T Obayashi	17	14

==== Section 2 ====
First round
4	(Chinese Taipei) Lin C-y	21	21
Q1	(China) Lei LX	19	16
(Japan) Y Tanaka	21	21
(Guatemala) K Cordón	16	17
6	(Canada) B Yang	17	21	24
(Brazil) J Matias	21	12	26
(Germany) K Schäfer	14	16
Q2	(Japan) K Takahashi	21	21

Second round
4	(Chinese Taipei) Lin C-y	21	21
(Japan) Y Tanaka	13	13
(Brazil) J Matias	16	5
Q2	(Japan) K Takahashi	21	21

Quarter-finals
4	(Chinese Taipei) Lin c-y	21	21
Q2	(Japan) K Takahashi	11	13

=== Bottom half ===
==== Section 3 ====
First round
Q3	(France) E Roy	16	21	16
(Israel) M Zilberman	21	18	21
Q4	(India) S Subramanian	21	21
8	(Republic of Ireland) N Nguyen	11	16
(Czech Republic) J Louda	21	21
(France) A Merklé	8	18
(Finland) K Koljonen	8	16
3	(India) L Sen	21	21

Second round
(Israel) M Zilberman	18	23	13
Q4	(India) S Subramanian	21	21	21
(Czech Republic) J Louda	8	21
3	(India) L Sen	21	23

Quarter-finals
Q4	(India) S Subramanian	10	17
3	(India) L Sen	21	21

==== Section 4 ====
First round
(Chinese Taipei) Su L-y	21	21
(El Salvador) U Canjura	7	6
(Chinese Taipei) Lee C-h	20	21
5	(China) Weng HY	22	23
(Belgium) J Carraggi	10	15
(Chinese Taipei) Chi Y-j	21	21
(India) B S Praneeth	21	14	19
2	(China) Li SF	16	21	21

Second round
(Chinese Taipei) Su L-y	21	19	21
5	(China) Weng HY	19	21	13
(Chinese Taipei) Chi Y-j	18	16
2	(China) Li SF	21	21

Quarter-finals
(Chinese Taipei) Su L-y	14	16
2	(China) Li SF	21	21

== Women's singles ==
=== Seeds ===
1. (Thailand) Ratchanok Intanon (Semi-finals)
2. (Thailand) Busanan Ongbamrungphan (Withdrew)
3. (India) P. V. Sindhu (Quarter-finals)
4. (United States) Beiwen Zhang (Withdrew)
5. (Chinese Taipei) Hsu Wen-chi (First round)
6. (Thailand) Supanida Katethong (Champion)
7. (Vietnam) Nguyễn Thùy Linh (Quarter-finals)
8. (Denmark) Line Christophersen (Semi-finals)

=== Finals ===
Semi-finals
1	(Thailand) Ratchanok Intanon	21	17	9
(China) Gao Fangjie	14	21	21
6	(Thailand) Supanida Katethong	21	21
8	(Denmark) Line Christophersen	12	19

Final
(China) Gao Fangjie	15	16
6	(Thailand) Supanida Katethong	21	21

=== Top half ===
==== Section 1 ====
First round
1	(Thailand) R Intanon	21	21
PFQ	(Republic of Ireland) R Darragh	9	9
(Canada) W Y Zhang	21	21
(United States) L Lam	14	15
7	(Vietnam) Nguyễn T L	18	21	21
Q4	(United States) E Shi	21	4	13
(United States) I Wang	21	21
Q1	(Canada) J Dent	17	2

Second round
1	(Thailand) R Intanon	21	21
(Canada) W Y Zhang	16	12
7	(Vietnam) Nguyễn T L	26	17	21
(United States) I Wang	24	21	8

Quarter-finals
1	(Thailand) R Intanon	14	21	21
7	(Vietnam) Nguyễn T L	21	16	7

==== Section 2 ====
First round
3	(India) P. V. Sindhu	21	21
Q2	(United States) D Gupta	15	10
(Chinese Taipei) Sung S-y	21	22
(Denmark) A Schulz	17	20
5	(Chinese Taipei) Hsu W-c	10	21	16
(China) Gao FJ	21	11	21
(Canada) R Chan	21	18	21
(Ukraine) P Buhrova	13	21	18

Second round
3	(India) P. V. Sindhu	21	21
(Chinese Taipei) Sung S-y	14	12
(China) Gao FJ	21	21
(Canada) R Chan	13	10

Quarter-finals
3	(India) P. V. Sindhu	20	13
(China) Gao FJ	22	21

=== Bottom half ===
==== Section 3 ====
First round
(Chinese Taipei) Lin H-t	21	21
(India) Gadde R S	11	14
PFQ	(Peru) I Castillo	6	5
6	(Thailand) S Katethong	21	21
PFQ	(Mexico) V García	17	21	19
PFQ	(Mexico) S Solís	21	16	21
PFQ	(Mexico) H Gaitán	13	10
PFQ	(Denmark) J D Jakobsen	21	21

Second round
(Chinese Taipei) Lin H-t	14	21	13
6	(Thailand) S Katethong	21	16	21
PFQ	(Mexico) S Solís	7	8
PFQ	(Denmark) J D Jakobsen	21	21

Quarter-finals
6	(Thailand) S Katethong	21	21
PFQ	(Denmark) J D Jakobsen	7	11

==== Section 4 ====
First round
(Brazil) J Vieira	18	17
(Hungary) V Sándorházi	21	21
PFQ	(Czech Republic) T Švábíková	16	21
8	(Denmark) L Christophersen	21	23
(France) L Huet	21	19	18
Q3	(Canada) E Zhang	12	21	21
(United States) J Gai	19	20
PFQ	(Israel) K Polikarpova	21	22

Second round
(Hungary) V Sándorházi	16	10
8	(Denmark) L Christophersen	21	21
Q3	(Canada) E Zhang	21	21
PFQ	(Israel) K Polikarpova	7	18

Quarter-finals
8	(Denmark) L Christophersen	17	21	21
Q3	(Canada) E Zhang	21	12	15

== Men's doubles ==
=== Seeds ===
1. (Chinese Taipei) Su Ching-heng / Ye Hong-wei (Quarter-finals)
2. (France) Lucas Corvée / Ronan Labar (Quarter-finals)
3. (Malaysia) Goh Sze Fei / Nur Izzuddin (Champions)
4. (Chinese Taipei) Chang Ko-chi / Po Li-wei (Quarter-finals)
5. (China) Chen Boyang / Liu Yi (Semi-finals)
6. (India) Krishna Prasad Garaga / Vishnuvardhan Goud Panjala (First round)
7. (Chinese Taipei) Lee Fang-chih / Lee Fang-jen (Final)
8. (Denmark) Rasmus Kjær / Frederik Søgaard (First round)

=== Finals ===
Semi-finals
(Chinese Taipei) Lin Yu-chieh (Chinese Taipei) Su Li-wei	17	12
7	(Chinese Taipei) Lee Fang-chih (Chinese Taipei) Lee Fang-jen	21	21
3	(Malaysia) Goh Sze Fei (Malaysia) Nur Izzuddin	21	21
5	(China) Chen Boyang (China) Liu Yi	14	17

Final
7	(Chinese Taipei) Lee Fang-chih (Chinese Taipei) Lee Fang-jen	9	10
3	(Malaysia) Goh Sze Fei (Malaysia) Nur Izzuddin	21	21

=== Top half ===
==== Section 1 ====
First round
1	(Chinese Taipei) Su C-h (Chinese Taipei) Ye H-w	21	21
(Brazil) F Farias (Brazil) D Silva	17	17
(United States) V Chiu (United States) J Yuan	20	10
(Chinese Taipei) Chen Z-r (Chinese Taipei) Lu C	22	21
6	(India) K P Garaga (India) V G Panjala	14	14
(Chinese Taipei) Lin Y-c (Chinese Taipei) Su L-w	21	21
(Canada) K M Deraj (Canada) V Ho	7	10
(Japan) K Mitsuhashi (Japan) H Okamura	21	21

Second round
1	(Chinese Taipei) Su C-h (Chinese Taipei) Ye H-w	21	21
(Chinese Taipei) Chen Z-r (Chinese Taipei) Lu C	13	11
(Chinese Taipei) Lin Y-c (Chinese Taipei) Su L-w	21	16	21
(Japan) K Mitsuhashi (Japan) H Okamura	11	21	19

Quarter-finals
1	(Chinese Taipei) Su C-h (Chinese Taipei) Ye H-w	19	16
(Chinese Taipei) Lin Y-c (Chinese Taipei) Su L-w	21	21

==== Section 2 ====
First round
4	(Chinese Taipei) Chang K-c (Chinese Taipei) Po L-w	21	26
(Canada) K Lee (Canada) T A Lindeman	8	24
(Japan) S Mezaki (Japan) H Nishida	21	21
(Canada) A Dong (Canada) N Yakura	19	14
7	(Chinese Taipei) Lee F-c (Chinese Taipei) Lee F-j	21	21
(Canada) Chung L Y (Canada) J Yang	12	10
(United States) E Asuncion (United States) A Mar	w	/	o
(Norway) T Flåtten (Norway) V Rikheim

Second round
4	(Chinese Taipei) Chang K-c (Chinese Taipei) Po L-w	21	19	21
(Japan) S Mezaki (Japan) H Nishida	12	21	17
7	(Chinese Taipei) Lee F-c (Chinese Taipei) Lee F-j	21	21
(United States) E Asuncion (United States) A Mar	16	10

Quarter-finals
4	(Chinese Taipei) Chang K-c (Chinese Taipei) Po L-w	11	18
7	(Chinese Taipei) Lee F-c (Chinese Taipei) Lee F-j	21	21

=== Bottom half ===
==== Section 3 ====
First round
(Republic of Ireland) J Magee (Republic of Ireland) P Reynolds	22	13
(England) R Easton (England) Z Russ	24	21
(Chinese Taipei) Chiu h-c (Chinese Taipei) Yang M-t	21	16	22
8	(Denmark) R Kjær (Denmark) F Søgaard	19	21	20
(Canada) K Barkman (France) S Lenik	11	12
(United States) Chen Z-y (United States) P Smith	21	21
(Mexico) J Castillo (Mexico) L Montoya	16	13
3	(Malaysia) Goh S F (Malaysia) N Izzuddin	21	21

Second round
(England) R Easton (England) Z Russ	16	15
(Chinese Taipei) Chiu h-c (Chinese Taipei) Yang M-t	21	21
(Chinese Taipei) Chen Z Y (United States) P Smith	22	13	19
3	(Malaysia) Goh S F (Malaysia) N Izzuddin	20	21	21

Quarter-finals
(Chinese Taipei) Chiu h-c (Chinese Taipei) Yang M-t	15	19
3	(Malaysia) Goh S F (Malaysia) N Izzuddin	21	21

==== Section 4 ====
First round
(Scotland) C Grimley (Scotland) M Grimley	21	18	22
(Canada) L W Lok (Canada) L Pong	19	21	20
(Canada) H Bagheri (Canada) D Yu	1	6
5	(China) Chen BY (China) Liu Y	21	21
(France) J Maio (France) W Villeger
(Germany) B Geiss (Germany) J C Völker	w	/	o
(United States) Chua K W (Malaysia) M Syazmil I Z A	21	14	17
2	(France) L Corvée (France) R Labar	18	21	21

Second round
(Scotland) C Grimley (Scotland) M Grimley	12	15
5	(China) Chen BY (China) Liu Y	21	21
(Germany) B Geiss (Germany) J C Völker	20	17
2	(France) L Corvée (France) R Labar	22	21

Quarter-finals
5	(China) Chen BY (China) Liu Y	21	23
2	(France) L Corvée (France) R Labar	17	21

== Women's doubles ==
=== Seeds ===
1. (Denmark) Maiken Fruergaard / Sara Thygesen (Final)
2. (Chinese Taipei) Lee Chia-hsin / Teng Chun-hsun (Quarter-finals)
3. (France) Margot Lambert / Anne Tran (Second round)
4. (Chinese Taipei) Hsu Ya-ching / Lin Wan-ching (Semi-finals)
5. (China) Liu Shengshu / Tan Ning (Champions)
6. (Canada) Catherine Choi / Josephine Wu (First round)
7. (Chinese Taipei) Chang Ching-hui / Yang Ching-tun (Quarter-finals)
8. (United States) Annie Xu / Kerry Xu (Quarter-finals)

=== Finals ===
Semi-finals
1	(Denmark) Maiken Fruergaard (Denmark) Sara Thygesen	21	21
4	(Chinese Taipei) Hsu Ya-ching (Chinese Taipei) Lin Wan-ching	19	11
(China) Li Yijing (China) Luo Xumin	16	21	19
5	(China) Liu Shengshu (China) Tan Ning	21	19	21

Final
1	(Denmark) Maiken Fruergaard (Denmark) Sara Thygesen	19	19
5	(China) Liu Shengshu (China) Tan Ning	21	21

=== Top half ===
==== Section 1 ====
First round
(India) A Nayak (India) R C Venkatesh
(Canada) J Chow (Canada) E Zhang	w	/	o
(United States) F Corbett (United States) A Lee	21	20	21
(Australia) K Ea (Australia) G Somerville	18	22	17

Second round
1	(Denmark) M Fruergaard (Denmark) S Thygesen	21	21
(Canada) J Chow (Canada) E Zhang	12	17
8	(United States) A Xu (United States) K Xu	21	19	21
(United States) F Corbett (United States) A Lee	16	21	10

Quarter-finals
1	(Denmark) M Fruergaard (Denmark) S Thygesen	21	21
8	(United States) A Xu (United States) K Xu	14	18

==== Section 2 ====
First round
(India) R Panda (India) S Panda
(Canada) J Dent (Canada) C Lai	w	/	o
7	(Chinese Taipei) Chang C-h (Chinese Taipei) Yang C-t	21	16	21
(Germany) S Küspert (Germany) E Moszczynski	16	21	16
(United States) N Ju (United States) K Sheung	16	13
(United States) P L Cao Hok (United States) L Lam	21	21

Second round
4	(Chinese Taipei) Hsu Y-c (Chinese Taipei) Lin W-c	21	21
(Canada) J Dent (Canada) C Lai	9	10
7	(Chinese Taipei) Chang C-h (Chinese Taipei) Yang C-t	21	23	21
(United States) P L Cao Hok (United States) L Lam	16	25	13

Quarter-finals
4	(Chinese Taipei) Hsu Y-c (Chinese Taipei) Lin W-c	20	21	22
7	(Chinese Taipei) Chang C-h (Chinese Taipei) Yang C-t	22	17	20

=== Bottom half ===
==== Section 3 ====
First round
(Brazil) J Lima (Brazil) S Lima
(China) Keng SL (China) Zhang C	w	/	o
(Australia) S Mapasa (Australia) A Yu	22	21
6	(Canada) C Choi (Canada) J Wu	20	17
(Chinese Taipei) Hsu Y-h (Chinese Taipei) Lee C-c	19	12
(China) Li YJ (China) Luo XM	21	21

Second round
(China) Keng SL (China) Zhang C	21	16	21
(Australia) S Mapasa (Australia) A Yu	19	21	11
(China) Li YJ (China) Luo XM	21	21
3	(France) M Lambert (France) A Tran	15	7

Quarter-finals
(China) Keng SL (China) Zhang C	13	7
(China) Li YJ (China) Luo XM	21	21

==== Section 4 ====
First round
(Mexico) H Gaitán (Mexico) S Solis	11	12
(Japan) S Hobara (Japan) Y Suizu	21	21
(Canada) T Ng (Canada) W Y Zhang
(Brazil) S Lima (Brazil) J V Vieira	w	/	o

Second round
(Japan) S Hobara (Japan) Y Suizu	14	15
5	(China) Liu SS (China) Tan N	21	21
(Brazil) S Lima (Brazil) J V Vieira	7	12
2	(Chinese Taipei) Lee C-h (Chinese Taipei) Teng C-h	21	21

Quarter-finals
5	(China) Liu SS (China) Tan N	21	21
2	(Chinese Taipei) Lee C-h (Chinese Taipei) Teng C-h	18	13

== Mixed doubles ==
=== Seeds ===
1. (Chinese Taipei) Ye Hong-wei / Lee Chia-hsin (Champions)
2. (Chinese Taipei) Chang Ko-chi / Lee Chih-chen (Second round)
3. (Denmark) Mathias Thyrri / Amalie Magelund (Final)
4. (Chinese Taipei) Yang Po-hsuan / Hu Ling-fang (Semi-finals)
5. (United States) Vinson Chiu / Jennie Gai (Quarter-finals)
6. (Canada) Ty Alexander Lindeman / Josephine Wu (Quarter-finals)
7. (Thailand) Ruttanapak Oupthong / Jhenicha Sudjaipraparat (Withdrew)
8. (Brazil) Fabrício Farias / Jaqueline Lima (Withdrew)

=== Finals ===
Semi-finals
1	(Chinese Taipei) Ye Hong-wei (Chinese Taipei) Lee Chia-hsin	21	21
4	(Chinese Taipei) Yang Po-hsuan (Chinese Taipei) Hu Ling-fang	16	18
3	(Denmark) Mathias Thyrri (Denmark) Amalie Magelund	21	21
(United States) Presley Smith (United States) Allison Lee	13	17

Final
1	(Chinese Taipei) Ye Hong-wei (Chinese Taipei) Lee Chia-hsin	13	21	21
3	(Denmark) Mathias Thyrri (Denmark) Amalie Magelund	21	6	18

=== Top half ===
==== Section 1 ====
First round
(United States) D Bielin (United States) N Ju	11	17
(Germany) J C Völker (Germany) S Küspert	21	21
7	(Thailand) R Oupthong (Thailand) J Sudjaipraparat
(Egypt) A H Elgamal (Egypt) D Hany	w	/	o
(Chinese Taipei) Lee F-j (Chinese Taipei) Hsu Y-h	14	14
(Chinese Taipei) Chen Z-r (Chinese Taipei) Yang C-t	21	21

Second round
1	(Chinese Taipei) Ye H-w (Chinese Taipei) Lee C-h	21	21
(Germany) J C Völker (Germany) S Küspert	12	18
(Egypt) A H Elgamal (Egypt) D Hany	9	11
(Chinese Taipei) Chen Z-r (Chinese Taipei) Yang C-t	21	21

Quarter-finals
1	(Chinese Taipei) Ye H-w (Chinese Taipei) Lee C-h	21	21
(Chinese Taipei) Chen Z-r (Chinese Taipei) Yang C-t	17	17

==== Section 2 ====
First round
4	(Chinese Taipei) Yang P-hs (Chinese Taipei) Hu L-f	21	21
(United States) Chua K W (United States) K Sheung	11	11
(China) Cheng X (China) Chen FH	21	21
(Brazil) D Silva (Brazil) S Lima	11	9
6	(Canada) T A Lindeman (Canada) J Wu	21	21
(United States) T Tan (United States) K Ngo	12	11
(Canada) K Lee (Canada) E Zhang	14	17
(Chinese Taipei) Po L-w (Chinese Taipei) Chang C-h	21	21

Second round
4	(Chinese Taipei) Yang P-hs (Chinese Taipei) Hu L-f	10	21	21
(China) Cheng X (China) Chen FH	21	16	19
6	(Canada) T A Lindeman (Canada) J Wu	21	21
(Chinese Taipei) Po L-w (Chinese Taipei) Chang C-h	14	16

Quarter-finals
4	(Chinese Taipei) Yang P-hs (Chinese Taipei) Hu L-f	17	21	21
6	(Canada) T A Lindeman (Canada) J Wu	21	7	11

=== Bottom half ===
==== Section 3 ====
First round
(France) S Lenik (France) E Boyer	20	11
(Malaysia) M Syazmil I Z A (United States) E Shi	22	21
(Canada) N Yakura (Canada) C Lai	11	15
5	(United States) V Chiu (United States) J Gai	21	21
(Canada) D Zhou (Canada) J Dent	17	22
(Israel) M Zilberman (Israel) S Zilberman	21	24
(Denmark) M Mikkelsen (Denmark) R Søby Hansen	21	21	12
3	(Denmark) M Thyrri (Denmark) A Magelund	16	23	21

Second round
(Malaysia) M Syazmil I Z A (United States) E Shi	12	21	16
5	(United States) V Chiu (United States) J Gai	21	18	21
(Israel) M Zilberman (Israel) S Zilberman	10	8
3	(Denmark) M Thyrri (Denmark) A Magelund	21	21

Quarter-finals
5	(United States) V Chiu (United States) J Gai	10	22	14
3	(Denmark) M Thyrri (Denmark) A Magelund	21	20	21

==== Section 4 ====
First round
(United States) P Smith (United States) A Lee	21	23
(Germany) P Scheiel (Germany) F Volkmann	11	21
(Canada) Lam W L (Canada) J Chow	w	/	o
8	(Brazil) F Farias (Brazil) J Lima
(Australia) J Yu (Australia) S Mapasa	16	10
(Australia) K Choo (Australia) G Somerville	21	21

Second round
(United States) P Smith (United States) A Lee	21	18	21
(Canada) Lam W L (Canada) J Chow	13	21	11
(Australia) K Choo (Australia) G Somerville	24	23
2	(Chinese Taipei) Chang K-c (Chinese Taipei) Lee C-c	22	21

Quarter-finals
(United States) P Smith (United States) A Lee	9	22	21
(Australia) K Choo (Australia) G Somerville	21	20	15

Preceded by 2023 Canada Open	BWF World Tour; 2023 BWF season	Succeeded by 2023 Korea Open
