= Lee Fang-jen =

Taiwanese badminton player (born 1997)

Lee Fang-jen 李芳任
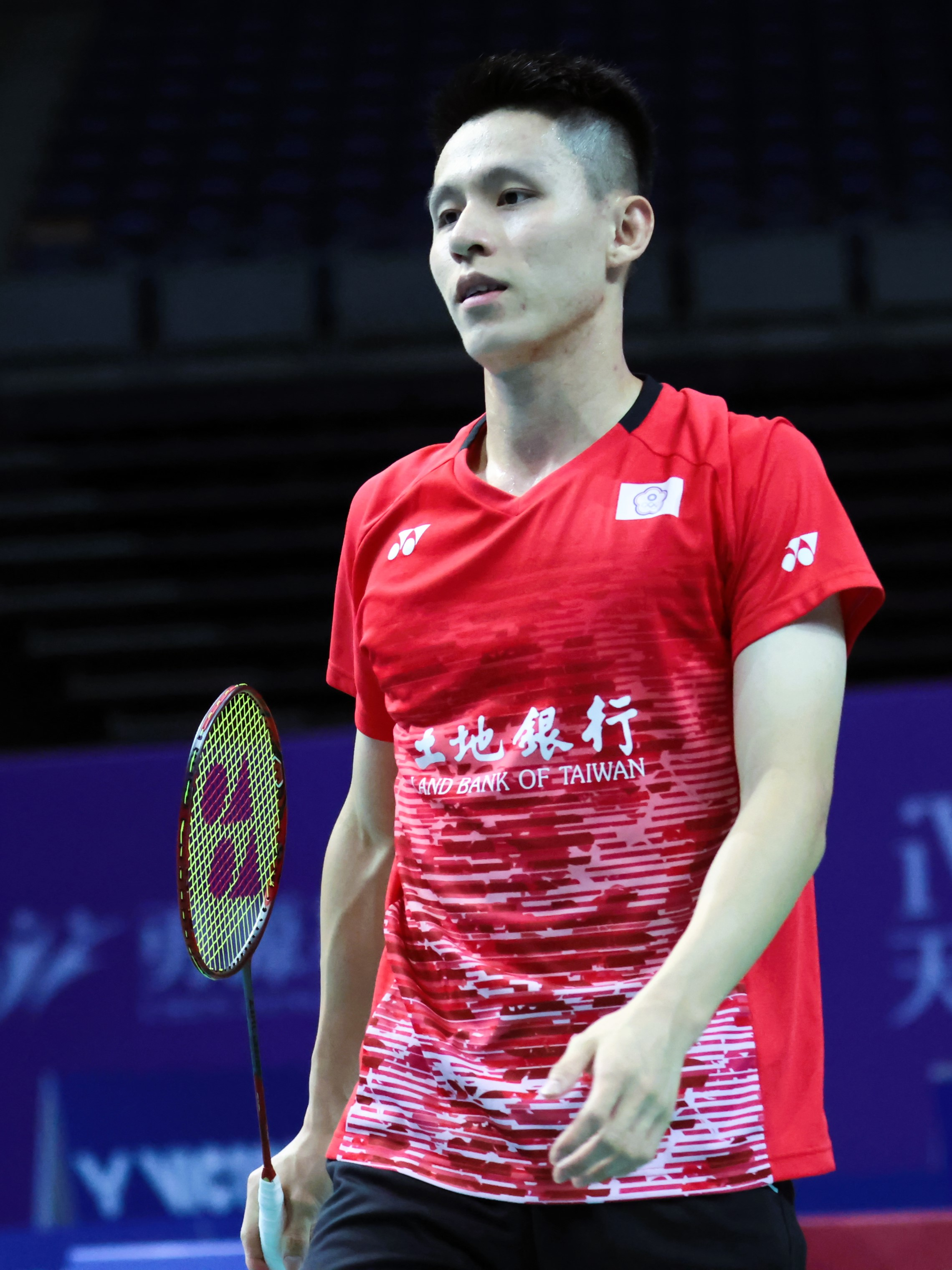
- Lee at the 2023 Kaohsiung Masters

Personal information
- Born: 20 September 1997 (age 29)

Sport
- Country: Republic of China (Taiwan)
- Sport: Badminton
- Handedness: Right

Men's & mixed doubles
- Highest ranking: 17 (MD with Lee Fang-chih, 23 September 2025); 125 (XD with Chang Hsin-tien, 14 May 2019)
- Current ranking: 21 (MD with Lee Fang-chih, 3 November 2026)
- BWF profile

Lee Fang-jen (Chinese: 李芳任; pinyin: Lǐ Fāngrèn; born 20 September 1997) is a Taiwanese badminton player. He plays men's doubles with his twin brother Lee Fang-chih.

== Achievements ==
=== BWF World Tour (2 titles, 2 runners-up) ===
The BWF World Tour, which was announced on 19 March 2017 and implemented in 2018, is a series of elite badminton tournaments sanctioned by the Badminton World Federation (BWF). The BWF World Tour is divided into levels of World Tour Finals, Super 1000, Super 750, Super 500, Super 300, and the BWF Tour Super 100.

Men's doubles
Year	Tournament	Level	Partner	Opponent	Score	Result	Ref.
2023	Spain Masters	Super 300	(Chinese Taipei) Lee Fang-chih	(China) He Jiting (China) Zhou Haodong	5–21, 12–21	(silver) Runner-up	
2023	U.S. Open	Super 300	(Chinese Taipei) Lee Fang-chih	(Malaysia) Goh Sze Fei (Malaysia) Nur Izzuddin	9–21, 10–21	(silver) Runner-up	
2025	Canada Open	Super 300	(Chinese Taipei) Lee Fang-chih	(Chinese Taipei) Chang Ko-chi (Chinese Taipei) Po Li-wei	21–19, 21–19	(gold) Winner	
2026	Swiss Open	Super 300	(Chinese Taipei) Lee Fang-chih	(Denmark) Daniel Lundgaard (Denmark) Mads Vestergaard	21–18, 21–13	(gold) Winner	

=== BWF International Challenge/Series (5 titles, 2 runners-up) ===
Men's doubles
Year	Tournament	Partner	Opponent	Score	Result
2016	Sydney International	(Chinese Taipei) Lee Fang-chih	(South Korea) Jung Young-keun (South Korea) Lee Jae-woo	10–21, 21–17, 21–13	(gold) Winner
2019	Portugal International	(Chinese Taipei) Chang Ko-chi	(Scotland) Christopher Grimley (Scotland) Matthew Grimley	16–21, 21–16, 21–13	(gold) Winner
2019	Norwegian International	(Chinese Taipei) Lee Fang-chih	(Denmark) Steve Olesen (Denmark) Andreas Søndergaard	17–21, 21–16, 21–13	(gold) Winner
2022	Sydney International	(Chinese Taipei) Lee Fang-chih	(Canada) Adam Dong (Canada) Nyl Yakura	21–12, 16–21, 21–16	(gold) Winner
2022	Bendigo International	(Chinese Taipei) Lee Fang-chih	(Chinese Taipei) Chang Ko-chi (Chinese Taipei) Po Li-wei	15–21, 21–14, 20–22	(silver) Runner-up
2022	North Harbour International	(Chinese Taipei) Lee Fang-chih	(Chinese Taipei) Chang Ko-chi (Chinese Taipei) Po Li-wei	21–10, 20–22, 13–21	(silver) Runner-up
2023	Saipan International	(Chinese Taipei) Lee Fang-chih	(Chinese Taipei) Chang Ko-chi (Chinese Taipei) Po Li-wei	30–29, 22–20	(gold) Winner

BWF International Challenge tournament
BWF International Series tournament
BWF Future Series tournament
