= Lei Lanxi =

Chinese badminton player

Lei Lanxi 雷兰曦
Personal information
- Born: 25 January 1998 (age 28) Dongguan, Guangdong, China
- Years active: 2016–present
- Height: 180 cm (5 ft 11 in)

Sport
- Country: China
- Sport: Badminton
- Handedness: Left
- Coached by: Tang Xianhu

Men's singles
- Highest ranking: 22 (24 September 2024)
- Current ranking: 119 (4 March 2026)
- BWF profile
Medal record
Men's badminton
Representing China
Asia Mixed Team Championships
Gold medal – first place	2023 Dubai	Mixed team
Asia Team Championships
Gold medal – first place	2024 Selangor	Men's team
World Junior Championships
Gold medal – first place	2016 Bilbao	Mixed team

Lei Lanxi (Chinese: 雷兰曦; pinyin: Léi Lánxī; born 25 January 1998) is a Chinese badminton player. He won a gold medal at the 2016 BWF World Junior Championships in the mixed team event.

== Early life ==
Lei was born in Dongguan, Guangdong. He started playing badminton at the age of 9 and entered the Dongguan Sports School, where he received scholarship from Tang Xianhu.

== Career ==
In 2016, Lei competed in the BWF World Junior Championships mixed team event and was selected to play against the Armenian team in the group stage. In 2019, he won his first title at the Belarus International. He also reached the quarter-finals of the Vietnam Open.

In 2022, he competed in the Asian Championships and qualified for the first round of the main draw, but lost to Kanta Tsuneyama in three games. He reached his second final at the 2022 Malang Indonesia International.

In 2023, he helped the national team win the Asia Mixed Team Championships.

== Achievements ==
=== BWF World Tour (2 runners-up) ===
The BWF World Tour, which was announced on 19 March 2017 and implemented in 2018, is a series of elite badminton tournaments sanctioned by the Badminton World Federation (BWF). The BWF World Tours are divided into levels of World Tour Finals, Super 1000, Super 750, Super 500, Super 300 (part of the HSBC World Tour), and the BWF Tour Super 100.

Men's singles
Year	Tournament	Level	Opponent	Score	Result
2024	U.S. Open	Super 300	(Japan) Yushi Tanaka	21–15, 18–21, 15–21	(silver) Runner-up
2024	Hong Kong Open	Super 500	(Denmark) Viktor Axelsen	9–21, 12–21	(silver) Runner-up

=== BWF International Challenge/Series (2 titles, 3 runners-up) ===
Men's singles
Year	Tournament	Opponent	Score	Result
2019	Belarus International	(Estonia) Raul Must	21–10, 21–15	(gold) Winner
2022 (II)	Indonesia International	(China) Weng Hongyang	10–21, 10–21	(silver) Runner-up
2022	Vietnam International Series	(China) Liu Liang	10–21, 21–14, 18–21	(silver) Runner-up
2022	Malaysia International	(Indonesia) Syabda Perkasa Belawa	17–21, 18–21	(silver) Runner-up
2023	China International	(China) Liu Liang	21–7, 21–19	(gold) Winner

BWF International Challenge tournament
BWF International Series tournament
