= 2026 Malaysia Open (badminton) =

Badminton tournament in Malaysia

Tournament details
- Dates: 6–11 January
- Edition: 69th
- Level: Super 1000
- Total prize money: US$1,450,000
- Venue: Axiata Arena
- Location: Kuala Lumpur, Malaysia

Champions
- Men's singles: (Thailand) Kunlavut Vitidsarn
- Women's singles: (South Korea) An Se-young
- Men's doubles: (South Korea) Kim Won-ho (South Korea) Seo Seung-jae
- Women's doubles: (China) Liu Shengshu (China) Tan Ning
- Mixed doubles: (China) Feng Yanzhe (China) Huang Dongping

The 2026 Malaysia Open (officially known as the Petronas Malaysia Open 2026 for sponsorship reasons) was a badminton tournament which took place at the Axiata Arena, Kuala Lumpur, Malaysia, from 6 to 11 January 2026 and had a total prize of US$1,450,000.

== Tournament ==
The 2026 Malaysia Open was the first tournament of the 2026 BWF World Tour and was part of the Malaysia Open championships, which have been held since 1937. This tournament was organized by the Badminton Association of Malaysia with sanction from the BWF.

=== Venue ===
This tournament was held at the Axiata Arena inside the KL Sports City in Kuala Lumpur, Malaysia.

=== Point distribution ===
Below is the point distribution table for each phase of the tournament based on the BWF points system for the BWF World Tour Super 1000 event.

Winner	Runner-up	3/4	5/8	9/16	17/32
12,000	10,200	8,400	6,600	4,800	3,000

=== Prize pool ===
The total prize money was US$1,450,000 with the distribution of the prize money in accordance with BWF regulations.

Event	Winner	Finalist	Semi-finals	Quarter-finals	Last 16	Last 32
Singles	$101,500	$49,300	$20,300	$7,975	$4,350	$1,450
Doubles	$107,300	$50,750	$20,300	$9,062.50	$4,712.50	$1,450

== Men's singles ==
=== Seeds ===
1. (China) Shi Yuqi (final)
2. (Thailand) Kunlavut Vitidsarn (champion)
3. (Denmark) Anders Antonsen (semi-finals)
4. (Indonesia) Jonatan Christie (semi-finals)
5. (Chinese Taipei) Chou Tien-chen (second round)
6. (France) Christo Popov (first round)
7. (France) Alex Lanier (quarter-finals)
8. (Japan) Kodai Naraoka (quarter-finals)

=== Finals ===
Semi-finals
1	(China) Shi Yuqi	21	21
3	(Denmark) Anders Antonsen	13	14
4	(Indonesia) Jonatan Christie	16	16
2	(Thailand) Kunlavut Vitidsarn	21	21

Final
1	(China) Shi Yuqi	21	1^{r}
2	(Thailand) Kunlavut Vitidsarn	23	6

=== Top half ===
==== Section 1 ====
First round
1	(China) Shi YQ	23	21
(Denmark) R Gemke	21	15
(India) A Shetty	21	21
(Malaysia) Lee Z J	12	17
6	(France) C Popov	21	19	21
(Hong Kong) Lee C Y	13	21	23
(India) L Sen	21	15	21
(Singapore) J Teh	16	21	14

Second round
1	(China) Shi YQ	21	18	21
(India) A Shetty	18	21	12
(Hong Kong) Lee C Y	22	21
(India) L Sen	20	15

Quarter-finals
1	(China) Shi YQ	21	21
(Hong Kong) Lee C Y	10	7

==== Section 2 ====
First round
3	(Denmark) A Antonsen	21	14	21
(Singapore) Loh K Y	13	21	18
(Japan) Y Tanaka	21	21	7
(Canada) V Lai	16	23	21
5	(Chinese Taipei) Chou T-c	21	21
(Chinese Taipei) Lin C-y	14	12
(Japan) K Nishimoto	21	14	21
(France) T J Popov	14	21	5

Second round
3	(Denmark) A Antonsen	21	21
(Canada) V Lai	16	15
5	(Chinese Taipei) Chou T-c	17	15
(Japan) K Nishimoto	21	21

Quarter-finals
3	(Denmark) A Antonsen	21	21
(Japan) K Nishimoto	9	12

=== Bottom half ===
==== Section 3 ====
First round
(China) Lu GZ	21	21
(Hong Kong) Ng K L	17	15
(Chinese Taipei) Chi Y-j	18	18
8	(Japan) K Naraoka	21	21
(Malaysia) Leong J H	21	21
(China) Wang ZX	17	17
(Chinese Taipei) Lee C-h	18	14
4	(Indonesia) J Christie	21	21

Second round
(China) Lu GZ	18	21	16
8	(Japan) K Naraoka	21	16	21
(Malaysia) Leong J H	18	11
4	(Indonesia) J Christie	21	21

Quarter-finals
8	(Japan) K Naraoka	17	13
4	(Indonesia) J Christie	21	21

==== Section 4 ====
First round
(Republic of Ireland) N Nguyen	21	21
(Canada) B Yang	8	19
(Indonesia) A Farhan	13	21	13
7	(France) A Lanier	21	19	21
(Japan) K Watanabe	16	21	21
(China) Weng HY	21	7	13
(Chinese Taipei) Wang T-w	10	13
2	(Thailand) K Vitidsarn	21	21

Second round
(Republic of Ireland) N Nguyen	8	19
7	(France) A Lanier	21	21
(Japan) K Watanabe	12	14
2	(Thailand) K Vitidsarn	21	21

Quarter-finals
7	(France) A Lanier	21	10	13
2	(Thailand) K Vitidsarn	15	21	21

== Women's singles ==
=== Seeds ===
1. (South Korea) An Se-young (champion)
2. (China) Wang Zhiyi (final)
3. (Japan) Akane Yamaguchi (quarter-finals)
4. (China) Chen Yufei (semi-finals)
5. (China) Han Yue (second round)
6. (Indonesia) Putri Kusuma Wardani (quarter-finals)
7. (Thailand) Ratchanok Intanon (quarter-finals)
8. (Japan) Tomoka Miyazaki (second round)

=== Finals ===
Semi-finals
1	(South Korea) An Se-young	w	/	o
4	(China) Chen Yufei
(India) P. V. Sindhu	16	15
2	(China) Wang Zhiyi	21	21

Final
1	(South Korea) An Se-young	21	24
2	(China) Wang Zhiyi	15	22

=== Top half ===
==== Section 1 ====
First round
1	(South Korea) An S-y	19	21	21
(Canada) M Li	21	16	18
(Japan) N Okuhara	21	21
(Chinese Taipei) Pai Y-p	12	14
5	(China) Han Y	21	21
(South Korea) Kim G-e	16	10
PFR	(Chinese Taipei) Huang Y-h	13	16
(Denmark) L Kjærsfeldt	21	21

Second round
1	(South Korea) An S-y	21	21
(Japan) N Okuhara	17	7
5	(China) Han Y
(Denmark) L Kjærsfeldt	w	/	o

Quarter-finals
1	(South Korea) An S-y	21	21
(Denmark) L Kjærsfeldt	8	9

==== Section 2 ====
First round
4	(China) Chen YF	10	21	21
PFR	(Thailand) P Opatniputh	21	13	16
(Thailand) S Katethong	16	18
(Thailand) B Ongbamrungphan	21	21
7	(Thailand) R Intanon	21	21
(India) M Bansod	11	11
(Denmark) M Blichfeldt	21	21	22
(Japan) N Nidaira	15	23	20

Second round
4	(China) Chen YF	19	21	21
(Thailand) B Ongbamrungphan	21	12	9
7	(Thailand) R Intanon	21	21
(Denmark) M Blichfeldt	8	7

Quarter-finals
4	(China) Chen YF	21	21
7	(Thailand) R Intanon	13	14

=== Bottom half ===
==== Section 3 ====
First round
(India) P. V. Sindhu	21	22
(Chinese Taipei) Sung S-y	13	20
(South Korea) Sim Y-j	19	2^{r}
8	(Japan) T Miyazaki	21	1
(Japan) R Gunji	21	17	19
(China) Gao FJ	13	21	21
(Chinese Taipei) Hsu W-c	9	12
3	(Japan) A Yamaguchi	21	21

Second round
(India) P. V. Sindhu	21	21
8	(Japan) T Miyazaki	8	13
(China) Gao FJ	11	21	17
3	(Japan) A Yamaguchi	21	4	21

Quarter-finals
(India) P. V. Sindhu	21
3	(Japan) A Yamaguchi	11^{r}

==== Section 4 ====
First round
(Denmark) L Christophersen	14	21	9
(United States) BW Zhang	21	14	21
(Japan) M Suizu	8	16
6	(Indonesia) P K Wardani	21	21
(Chinese Taipei) Lin H-t	21	21
(Chinese Taipei) Chiu P-c	11	11
(Scotland) K Gilmour	17	9
2	(China) Wang ZY	21	21

Second round
(United States) BW Zhang	21	16	18
6	(Indonesia) P K Wardani	5	21	21
(Chinese Taipei) Lin H-t	15	8
2	(China) Wang ZY	21	21

Quarter-finals
6	(Indonesia) P K Wardani	17	18
2	(China) Wang ZY	21	21

== Men's doubles ==
=== Seeds ===
1. (South Korea) Kim Won-ho / Seo Seung-jae (champions)
2. (Malaysia) Aaron Chia / Soh Wooi Yik (final)
3. (India) Satwiksairaj Rankireddy / Chirag Shetty (quarter-finals)
4. (China) Liang Weikeng / Wang Chang (first round)
5. (Malaysia) Man Wei Chong / Tee Kai Wun (quarter-finals)
6. (Indonesia) Fajar Alfian / Muhammad Shohibul Fikri (semi-finals)
7. (Malaysia) Goh Sze Fei / Nur Izzuddin (second round)
8. (Indonesia) Sabar Karyaman Gutama / Muhammad Reza Pahlevi Isfahani (quarter-finals)

=== Finals ===
Semi-finals
1	(South Korea) Kim Won-ho (South Korea) Seo Seung-jae	8	21	21
(England) Ben Lane (England) Sean Vendy	21	11	18
6	(Indonesia) Fajar Alfian (Indonesia) Muhammad Shohibul Fikri	21	18
2	(Malaysia) Aaron Chia (Malaysia) Soh Wooi Yik	23	21

Final
1	(South Korea) Kim Won-ho (South Korea) Seo Seung-jae	21	12	21
2	(Malaysia) Aaron Chia (Malaysia) Soh Wooi Yik	15	21	18

=== Top half ===
==== Section 1 ====
First round
1	(South Korea) Kim W-h (South Korea) Seo S-j	21	21
(China) Chen BY (China) Liu Yi	18	17
(Malaysia) Ong Y S (Malaysia) Teo E Y	21	22	11
(Malaysia) N M Azriyn A (Malaysia) Tan W K	11	24	21
5	(Malaysia) Man W C (Malaysia) Tee K W	21	21
(Denmark) K Astrup (Denmark) A S Rasmussen	17	18
(Japan) H Midorikawa (Japan) K Yamashita	21	22
(India) H Amsakarunan (India) Arjun M. R.	10	20

Second round
1	(South Korea) Kim W-h (South Korea) Seo S-j	21	21
(Malaysia) N M Azriyn A (Malaysia) Tan W K	15	16
5	(Malaysia) Man W C (Malaysia) Tee K W	21	21
(Japan) H Midorikawa (Japan) K Yamashita	9	15

Quarter-finals
1	(South Korea) Kim W-h (South Korea) Seo S-j	21	21
5	(Malaysia) Man W C (Malaysia) Tee K W	17	14

==== Section 2 ====
First round
4	(China) Liang WK (China) Wang C	21	7	17
(Japan) T Hoki (Japan) Y Kobayashi	18	21	21
(Japan) K Kumagai (Japan) H Nishi	21	21
(Japan) T Nomura (Japan) Y Shimogami	16	11
7	(Malaysia) Goh S F (Malaysia) N Izzuddin	21	21
(Denmark) D Lundgaard (Denmark) M Vestergaard	15	13
(England) B Lane (England) S Vendy	16	21	21
(Malaysia) Choong H J (Malaysia) M Haikal	21	16	15

Second round
(Japan) T Hoki (Japan) Y Kobayashi	24	21
(Japan) K Kumagai (Japan) H Nishi	22	10
7	(Malaysia) Goh S F (Malaysia) N Izzuddin	13	17
(England) B Lane (England) S Vendy	21	21

Quarter-finals
(Japan) T Hoki (Japan) Y Kobayashi	20	19
(England) B Lane (England) S Vendy	22	21

=== Bottom half ===
==== Section 3 ====
First round
(Chinese Taipei) Chen Z-r (Chinese Taipei) Lin Y-c	19	21	21
(France) C Popov (France) T J Popov	21	17	13
(Chinese Taipei) Lee F-c (Chinese Taipei) Lee F-j	26	4	8
6	(Indonesia) F Alfian (Indonesia) M S Fikri	24	21	21
(Malaysia) J Arif (Malaysia) Yap R K	22	21
(South Korea) Choi S-g (Malaysia) Goh V S	20	12
(Chinese Taipei) Lee J-h (Chinese Taipei) Yang P-hs	13	15
3	(India) S Rankireddy (India) C Shetty	21	21

Second round
(Chinese Taipei) Chen Z-r (Chinese Taipei) Lin Y-c	19	19
6	(Indonesia) F Alfian (Indonesia) M S Fikri	21	21
(Malaysia) J Arif (Malaysia) Yap R K	18	11
3	(India) S Rankireddy (India) C Shetty	21	21

Quarter-finals
6	(Indonesia) F Alfian (Indonesia) M S Fikri	21	23
3	(India) S Rankireddy (India) C Shetty	10	21

==== Section 4 ====
First round
(South Korea) Kang M-h (South Korea) Ki D-j	23	18	21
(China) Huang D (China) Ren XY	21	21	14
(Indonesia) R Indra (Indonesia) N Joaquin	18	9
8	(Indonesia) S K Gutama (Indonesia) M R P Isfahani	21	21
(China) Chen XJ (China) Liu Ya	24	21
(Chinese Taipei) Liu K-h (Chinese Taipei) Yang P-ha	22	13
(United States) Chen Z-y (United States) P Smith	11	19
2	(Malaysia) A Chia (Malaysia) Soh W Y	21	21

Second round
(South Korea) Kang M-h (South Korea) Ki D-j	10	21	19
8	(Indonesia) S K Gutama (Indonesia) M R P Isfahani	21	14	21
(China) Chen XJ (China) Liu Ya	14	21	14
2	(Malaysia) A Chia (Malaysia) Soh W Y	21	14	21

Quarter-finals
8	(Indonesia) S K Gutama (Indonesia) M R P Isfahani	19	10
2	(Malaysia) A Chia (Malaysia) Soh W Y	21	21

== Women's doubles ==
=== Seeds ===
1. (China) Liu Shengshu / Tan Ning (champions)
2. (Malaysia) Pearly Tan / Thinaah Muralitharan (second round)
3. (South Korea) Kim Hye-jeong / Kong Hee-yong (second round)
4. (China) Jia Yifan / Zhang Shuxian (second round)
5. (Japan) Yuki Fukushima / Mayu Matsumoto (semi-finals)
6. (South Korea) Baek Ha-na / Lee So-hee (final)
7. (Chinese Taipei) Hsieh Pei-shan / Hung En-tzu (second round)
8. (Hong Kong) Yeung Nga Ting / Yeung Pui Lam (first round)

=== Finals ===
Semi-finals
1	(China) Liu Shengshu (China) Tan Ning	21	21
(South Korea) Jeong Na-eun (South Korea) Lee Yeon-woo	8	17
5	(Japan) Yuki Fukushima (Japan) Mayu Matsumoto	16	12
6	(South Korea) Baek Ha-na (South Korea) Lee So-hee	21	21

Final
1	(China) Liu Shengshu (China) Tan Ning	21	21
6	(South Korea) Baek Ha-na (South Korea) Lee So-hee	18	12

=== Top half ===
==== Section 1 ====
First round
1	(China) Liu SS (China) Tan N	21	21
(United States) F Corbett (United States) J Gai	8	16
(Malaysia) Ong X Y (Malaysia) C Ting	16	11
(Japan) R Hirokami (Japan) S Hobara	21	21
7	(Chinese Taipei) Hsieh P-s (Chinese Taipei) Hung E-t	21	21
(Chinese Taipei) Lin X-m (Chinese Taipei) Wang Y-q	15	17
(Hong Kong) Lui L L (Hong Kong) Tsang H Y	18	15
(Japan) R Hiramoto (Japan) K Ishikawa	21	21

Second round
1	(China) Liu SS (China) Tan N	21	21
(Japan) R Hirokami (Japan) S Hobara	19	9
7	(Chinese Taipei) Hsieh P-s (Chinese Taipei) Hung E-t	14	21	18
(Japan) R Hiramoto (Japan) K Ishikawa	21	15	21

Quarter-finals
1	(China) Liu SS (China) Tan N	21	21
(Japan) R Hiramoto (Japan) K Ishikawa	15	12

==== Section 2 ====
First round
3	(South Korea) Kim H-j (South Korea) Kong H-y	21	22
(Scotland) J MacPherson (Scotland) C Torrance	12	20
(Chinese Taipei) Chang C-h (Chinese Taipei) Yang C-t	12	22	11
(Japan) K Osawa (Japan) M Tanabe	21	20	21
8	(Hong Kong) Yeung N T (Hong Kong) Yeung P L	19	21	16
PFR	(Thailand) O Jongsathapornparn (Thailand) S Suwachai	21	11	21
(Japan) A Igarashi (Japan) C Shida	11	16
(South Korea) Jeong N-e (South Korea) Lee Y-w	21	21

Second round
3	(South Korea) Kim H-j (South Korea) Kong H-y	21	21	19
(Japan) K Osawa (Japan) M Tanabe	23	17	21
PFR	(Thailand) O Jongsathapornparn (Thailand) S Suwachai	14	13
(South Korea) Jeong N-e (South Korea) Lee Y-w	21	21

Quarter-finals
(Japan) K Osawa (Japan) M Tanabe	10	15
(South Korea) Jeong N-e (South Korea) Lee Y-w	21	21

=== Bottom half ===
==== Section 3 ====
First round
(Ukraine) P Buhrova (Ukraine) Y Kantemyr	19	21	14
(Poland) P Cybulska (Poland) K Marczak	21	19	21
PFR	(India) K Selvam (India) S Singhi	12	11
5	(Japan) Y Fukushima (Japan) M Matsumoto	21	21
(Canada) J Dent (Canada) C Lai	21	21
(Chinese Taipei) Hsu Y-h (Chinese Taipei) Lin J-y	23	23
(Chinese Taipei) Hsu Y-c (Chinese Taipei) Sung Y-h	19	10
4	(China) Jia YF (China) Zhang SX	21	21

Second round
(Poland) P Cybulska (Poland) K Marczak	6	14
5	(Japan) Y Fukushima (Japan) M Matsumoto	21	21
(Chinese Taipei) Hsu Y-h (Chinese Taipei) Lin J-y	w	/	o
4	(China) Jia YF (China) Zhang SX

Quarter-finals
5	(Japan) Y Fukushima (Japan) M Matsumoto	21	21
(Chinese Taipei) Hsu Y-h (Chinese Taipei) Lin J-y	11	17

==== Section 4 ====
First round
(France) M Lambert (France) C Pognante	17	13
(Chinese Taipei) Hu L-f (Chinese Taipei) Jheng Y-c	21	21
(Japan) N Hara (Japan) R Kiyose	13	9
6	(South Korea) Baek H-n (South Korea) Lee S-h	21	21
(India) T Jolly (India) G Gopichand	9	23	19
(Indonesia) F D Kusuma (Indonesia) M T Puspita Sari	21	21	21
(India) R Panda (India) S Panda	11	9
2	(Malaysia) P Tan (Malaysia) Thinaah M	21	21

Second round
(Chinese Taipei) Hu L-f (Chinese Taipei) Jheng Y-c	12	9
6	(South Korea) Baek H-n (South Korea) Lee S-h	21	21
(Indonesia) F D Kusuma (Indonesia) M T Puspita Sari	26	21
2	(Malaysia) P Tan (Malaysia) Thinaah M	24	17

Quarter-finals
6	(South Korea) Baek H-n (South Korea) Lee S-h	13	21	21
(Indonesia) F D Kusuma (Indonesia) M T Puspita Sari	21	19	13

== Mixed doubles ==
=== Seeds ===
1. (China) Feng Yanzhe / Huang Dongping (champions)
2. (China) Jiang Zhenbang / Wei Yaxin (final)
3. (Thailand) Dechapol Puavaranukroh / Supissara Paewsampran (quarter-finals)
4. (Malaysia) Chen Tang Jie / Toh Ee Wei (quarter-finals)
5. (France) Thom Gicquel / Delphine Delrue (first round)
6. (China) Guo Xinwa / Chen Fanghui (quarter-finals)
7. (Hong Kong) Tang Chun Man / Tse Ying Suet (semi-finals)
8. (Malaysia) Goh Soon Huat / Shevon Jemie Lai (second round)

=== Finals ===
Semi-finals
1	(China) Feng Yanzhe (China) Huang Dongping	21	21
7	(Hong Kong) Tang Chun Man (Hong Kong) Tse Ying Suet	14	14
(Denmark) Jesper Toft (Denmark) Amalie Magelund	15	14
2	(China) Jiang Zhenbang (China) Wei Yaxin	21	21

Final
1	(China) Feng Yanzhe (China) Huang Dongping	21	21
2	(China) Jiang Zhenbang (China) Wei Yaxin	19	19

=== Top half ===
==== Section 1 ====
First round
1	(China) Feng YZ (China) Huang DP	14
(Malaysia) Wong T C (Malaysia) Lim C S	2^{r}
(China) Cheng X (China) Zhang C	18	22	21
PFR	(Japan) H Midorikawa (Japan) N Matsuyama	21	20	15
6	(China) Guo XW (China) Chen FH	21	21
(Scotland) A Dunn (Scotland) J MacPherson	16	10
(Germany) M Seidel (Germany) T P Nguyen	18	21	21
(Chinese Taipei) Yang P-h (Chinese Taipei) Hu L-f	21	19	12

Second round
1	(China) Feng YZ (China) Huang DP	22	21
(China) Cheng X (China) Zhang C	20	16
6	(China) Guo XW (China) Chen FH	13	21	21
(Germany) M Seidel (Germany) T P Nguyen	21	16	10

Quarter-finals
1	(China) Feng YZ (China) Huang DP	21	21
6	(China) Guo XW (China) Chen FH	16	9

==== Section 2 ====
First round
4	(Malaysia) Chen T J (Malaysia) Toh E W	21	21
(Indonesia) J Hidayatullah (Indonesia) F Pasaribu	12	17
(Denmark) M Christiansen (Denmark) A Bøje	22	18	17
(Malaysia) Hoo P R (Malaysia) Cheng S Y	20	21	21
7	(Hong Kong) Tang C M (Hong Kong) Tse Y S	21	21
(Malaysia) J Wong (Malaysia) Lai P J	10	9
(Chinese Taipei) Chen C-k (Chinese Taipei) Hsu Y-h	21	19	21
(Denmark) M Vestergaard (Denmark) C Busch	19	21	17

Second round
4	(Malaysia) Chen T J (Malaysia) Toh E W	21	23
(Malaysia) Hoo P R (Malaysia) Cheng S Y	13	21
7	(Hong Kong) Tang C M (Hong Kong) Tse Y S	21	21
(Chinese Taipei) Chen C-k (Chinese Taipei) Hsu Y-h	14	19

Quarter-finals
4	(Malaysia) Chen T J (Malaysia) Toh E W	17	21	10
7	(Hong Kong) Tang C M (Hong Kong) Tse Y S	21	17	21

=== Bottom half ===
==== Section 3 ====
First round
(Indonesia) M Faza (Indonesia) A Pranata	21	16	16
(France) J Maio (France) L Palermo	9	21	21
(Denmark) J Toft (Denmark) A Magelund	21	17	21
5	(France) T Gicquel (France) D Delrue	13	21	9
(Japan) Y Shimogami (Japan) S Hobara	20	23	20
(Japan) A Koga (Japan) N Saito	22	21	22
(Chinese Taipei) Ye H-w (Chinese Taipei) N G Chan	16	18
3	(Thailand) D Puavaranukroh (Thailand) S Paewsampran	21	21

Second round
(France) J Maio (France) L Palermo	21	14	13
(Denmark) J Toft (Denmark) A Magelund	17	21	21
(Japan) A Koga (Japan) N Saito	21	8	19
3	(Thailand) D Puavaranukroh (Thailand) S Paewsampran	16	21	21

Quarter-finals
(Denmark) J Toft (Denmark) A Magelund	21	8	21
3	(Thailand) D Puavaranukroh (Thailand) S Paewsampran	12	21	19

==== Section 4 ====
First round
(India) D Kapila (India) T Crasto	15	21	15
(United States) P Smith (United States) J Gai	21	18	21
(Chinese Taipei) Wu G-x (Chinese Taipei) Lee C-h	21	19	14
8	(Malaysia) Goh S H (Malaysia) S J Lai	15	21	21
(Thailand) P Horbanluekit (Thailand) B Aimsaard	21	21
(India) A Surya (India) A Pramuthesh	11	9
(India) R Kapoor (India) R Gadde	10	17
2	(China) Jiang ZB (China) Wei YX	21	21

Second round
(United States) P Smith (United States) J Gai	21	21
8	(Malaysia) Goh S H (Malaysia) S J Lai	9	17
(Thailand) P Horbanluekit (Thailand) B Aimsaard	12	12
2	(China) Jiang ZB (China) Wei YX	21	21

Quarter-finals
(United States) P Smith (United States) J Gai	16	13
2	(China) Jiang ZB (China) Wei YX	21	21

Preceded by 2025 BWF World Tour Finals	BWF World Tour; 2026 BWF season	Succeeded by 2026 India Open
