= 2025 Hylo Open =

2025 badminton tournament in Saarbrücken

Tournament details
- Dates: 28 October–2 November
- Edition: 38th
- Level: Super 500
- Total prize money: US$475,000
- Venue: Saarlandhalle
- Location: Saarbrücken, Germany

Champions
- Men's singles: (Indonesia) Jonatan Christie
- Women's singles: (Denmark) Mia Blichfeldt
- Men's doubles: (Chinese Taipei) Chiu Hsiang-chieh (Chinese Taipei) Wang Chi-lin
- Women's doubles: (France) Margot Lambert (France) Camille Pognante
- Mixed doubles: (Denmark) Mathias Christiansen (Denmark) Alexandra Bøje
- Official website: hylo-open.de/en/

The 2025 Hylo Open was a badminton tournament which took place at the Saarlandhalle in Saarbrücken, Germany, from 28 October to 2 November 2025 and had a total prize of US$475,000.

== Tournament ==
The 2025 Hylo Open was the thirty-third tournament of the 2025 BWF World Tour. It is a part of the Hylo Open, which had been held since 1988. This tournament is organized by the 1. BC Bischmisheim with sanction from the BWF. It was upgraded from BWF World Tour Super 300 to Super 500.

=== Venue ===
This international tournament was held at the Saarlandhalle in Saarbrücken, Germany.

=== Point distribution ===
Below is the point distribution table for each phase of the tournament based on the BWF points system for the BWF World Tour Super 500 event.

Winner	Runner-up	3/4	5/8	9/16	17/32	33/64	65/128
9,200	7,800	6,420	5,040	3,600	2,220	880	430

=== Prize money ===
The total prize money is US$475,000 and will be distributed according to BWF regulations.

Event	Winner	Finalist	Semi-finals	Quarter-finals	Last 16
Singles	$35,625	$18,050	$6,887.50	$2,850	$1,662.50
Doubles	$37,525	$18,050	$6,650	$3,443.75	$1,781.25

== Men's singles ==
=== Seeds ===
1. (Denmark) Anders Antonsen (withdrew)
2. (Indonesia) Jonatan Christie (champion)
3. (Chinese Taipei) Chou Tien-chen (first round)
4. (France) Alex Lanier (semi-finals)
5. (France) Christo Popov (first round)
6. (Singapore) Loh Kean Yew (second round)
7. (Chinese Taipei) Lin Chun-yi (first round)
8. (France) Toma Junior Popov (second round)

=== Finals ===
Semi-finals
(Finland) Kalle Koljonen	13	13
Q4	(Denmark) Magnus Johannesen	21	21
4	(France) Alex Lanier	21	19	9
2	(Indonesia) Jonatan Christie	18	21	21

Final
Q4	(Denmark) Magnus Johannesen	14	14
2	(Indonesia) Jonatan Christie	21	21

=== Top half ===
==== Section 1 ====
First round
3	(Chinese Taipei) Chou T-c	19	21	18
(Finland) K Koljonen	21	19	21
Q1	(Azerbaijan) D Pangestu	11	14
(Republic of Ireland) N Nguyen	21	21
6	(Singapore) Loh K Y	21	21
(Finland) J Oldorff	10	12
(Canada) V Lai	11	21	18
(India) A Shetty	21	4	21

Second round
(Finland) K Koljonen	21	21
(Republic of Ireland) N Nguyen	18	13
6	(Singapore) Loh K Y	11	11
(India) A Shetty	21	21

Quarter-finals
(Finland) K Koljonen	19	21	22
(India) A Shetty	21	12	20

==== Section 2 ====
First round
7	(Chinese Taipei) Lin C-y	21	20	13
Q4	(Denmark) M Johannesen	15	22	21
PFQ	(Malaysia) Kok J H	19	18
(Thailand) K Wangcharoen	21	21
SWM	(Japan) K Nishimoto	20	19
(Belgium) J Carraggi	22	21
Q2	(Denmark) D J Holm	12	21	21
(France) A Merklé	21	15	18

Second round
Q4	(Denmark) M Johannesen	21	21
(Thailand) K Wangcharoen	10	11
(Belgium) J Carraggi	11	21	17
Q2	(Denmark) D J Holm	21	15	21

Quarter-finals
Q4	(Denmark) M Johannesen	24	21
Q2	(Denmark) D J Holm	22	18

=== Bottom half ===
==== Section 3 ====
First round
(Malaysia) Leong J H	14	21	16
(India) S Subramanian	21	18	21
(India) L Sen	21	22
5	(France) C Popov	16	20
(Denmark) R Gemke	21	21
(Chinese Taipei) Lee C-h	14	9
(Chinese Taipei) Wang T-w	18	19
4	(France) A Lanier	21	21

Second round
(India) S Subramanian	14	11
(India) L Sen	21	21
(Denmark) R Gemke	15	21	18
4	(France) A Lanier	21	18	21

Quarter-finals
(India) L Sen	17	21	15
4	(France) A Lanier	21	14	21

==== Section 4 ====
First round
(India) S Kidambi	19	11
(India) K George	21	21
PFQ	(England) H Huang	7	21	19
8	(France) T J Popov	21	19	21
Q3	(Israel) D Dubovenko	14	14
(Chinese Taipei) Chi Y-j	21	21
(India) T Mannepalli	11	12
2	(Indonesia) J Christie	21	21

Second round
(India) K George	18	21	21
8	(France) T J Popov	21	18	19
(Chinese Taipei) Chi Y-j	21	11	14
2	(Indonesia) J Christie	19	21	21

Quarter-finals
(India) K George	10	16
2	(Indonesia) J Christie	21	21

== Women's singles ==
=== Seeds ===
1. (Indonesia) Putri Kusuma Wardani (final)
2. (Denmark) Mia Blichfeldt (champion)
3. (Denmark) Line Kjærsfeldt (first round)
4. (Chinese Taipei) Lin Hsiang-ti (quarter-finals)
5. (United States) Beiwen Zhang (second round)
6. (Denmark) Line Christophersen (semi-finals)
7. (Scotland) Kirsty Gilmour (withdrew)
8. (Denmark) Julie Dawall Jakobsen (second round)

=== Finals ===
Semi-finals
1	(Indonesia) Putri Kusuma Wardani	21	21
(India) Unnati Hooda	7	13
6	(Denmark) Line Christophersen	18	21	19
2	(Denmark) Mia Blichfeldt	21	7	21

Final
1	(Indonesia) Putri Kusuma Wardani	11	21	12
2	(Denmark) Mia Blichfeldt	21	7	21

=== Top half ===
==== Section 1 ====
First round
1	(Indonesia) P K Wardani	21	21
Q2	(Denmark) A Ryberg	18	5
(Bulgaria) K Nalbantova	9	20
(Malaysia) Kisona S	21	22
5	(United States) BW Zhang	21	21
(Germany) Y Li	13	11
PFQ	(Bulgaria) S Stoeva	17	21	19
(Azerbaijan) K F Azzahra	21	14	21

Second round
1	(Indonesia) P K Wardani	21	21
(Malaysia) Kisona S	11	13
5	(United States) BW Zhang	21	18	18
(Azerbaijan) K F Azzahra	12	21	21

Quarter-finals
1	(Indonesia) P K Wardani	21	21
(Azerbaijan) K F Azzahra	18	19

==== Section 2 ====
First round
4	(Chinese Taipei) Lin H-t	21	21
(India) T Hemanth	14	13
(Chinese Taipei) Pai Y-p	24	11	21
(Denmark) A Schulz	22	21	18
8	(Denmark) J D Jakobsen	26	23
(India) A Kharb	24	21
(Brazil) J Vieira	4	13
(India) U Hooda	21	21

Second round
4	(Chinese Taipei) Lin H-t	21	13	21
(Chinese Taipei) Pai Y-p	12	21	13
8	(Denmark) J D Jakobsen	9	18
(India) U Hooda	21	21

Quarter-finals
4	(Chinese Taipei) Lin H-t	20	13
(India) U Hooda	22	21

=== Bottom half ===
==== Section 3 ====
First round
(India) A Upadhyaya	19	19
(Ukraine) P Buhrova	21	21
Q1	(Chinese Taipei) Liao Y-c	14	9
6	(Denmark) L Christophersen	21	21
(India) R Ramraj	21	21
(Spain) C Azurmendi	14	16
(India) S Valishetty	21	21
3	(Denmark) L Kjærsfeldt	19	12

Second round
(Ukraine) P Buhrova	14	8
6	(Denmark) L Christophersen	21	21
(India) R Ramraj	19	21	21
(India) S Valishetty	21	8	13

Quarter-finals
6	(Denmark) L Christophersen	21	21
(India) R Ramraj	7	19

==== Section 4 ====
First round
(Turkey) N Arın	21	21
(India) A Kashyap	15	15
Q4	(France) A Tatranova	14	21	15
SWM	(Chinese Taipei) Hsu W-c	21	19	21
(Chinese Taipei) Huang C-p	9	15
(Malaysia) Letshanaa K	21	21
Q3	(Ukraine) Y Kantemyr	11	7
2	(Denmark) M Blichfeldt	21	21

Second round
(Turkey) N Arın	11	23	21
SWM	(Chinese Taipei) Hsu W-c	21	21	11
(Malaysia) Letshanaa K	11	13
2	(Denmark) M Blichfeldt	21	21

Quarter-finals
(Turkey) N Arın	21	16	11
2	(Denmark) M Blichfeldt	12	21	21

== Men's doubles ==
=== Seeds ===
1. (Malaysia) Aaron Chia / Soh Wooi Yik (quarter-finals)
2. (Malaysia) Goh Sze Fei / Nur Izzuddin (second round)
3. (Malaysia) Man Wei Chong / Tee Kai Wun (semi-finals)
4. (Denmark) Kim Astrup / Anders Skaarup Rasmussen (quarter-finals)
5. (Indonesia) Fajar Alfian / Muhammad Shohibul Fikri (quarter-finals)
6. (Indonesia) Sabar Karyaman Gutama / Muhammad Reza Pahlevi Isfahani (final)
7. (England) Ben Lane / Sean Vendy (first round)
8. (Chinese Taipei) Lee Jhe-huei / Yang Po-hsuan (semi-finals)

=== Finals ===
Semi-finals
6	(Indonesia) Sabar Karyaman Gutama (Indonesia) Muhammad Reza Pahlevi Isfahani	21	21
3	(Malaysia) Man Wei Chong (Malaysia) Tee Kai Wun	16	15
(Chinese Taipei) Chiu Hsiang-chieh (Chinese Taipei) Wang Chi-lin	21	16	24
8	(Chinese Taipei) Lee Jhe-huei (Chinese Taipei) Yang Po-hsuan	17	21	22

Final
6	(Indonesia) Sabar Karyaman Gutama (Indonesia) Muhammad Reza Pahlevi Isfahani	19	18
(Chinese Taipei) Chiu Hsiang-chieh (Chinese Taipei) Wang Chi-lin	21	21

=== Top half ===
==== Section 1 ====
First round
1	(Malaysia) A Chia (Malaysia) Soh W Y	25	21
PFQ	(England) A Green (England) Z Russ	23	14
(Czech Republic) J Král (Czech Republic) O Král	21	21
Q2	(Germany) J Dresp (Germany) S Krax	16	10
6	(Indonesia) S K Gutama (Indonesia) M R P Isfahani	22	21
(France) É Adam (France) L Rossi	20	13
(India) P Roy (India) K. Sai Pratheek	15	18
(France) C Popov (France) T J Popov	21	21

Second round
1	(Malaysia) A Chia (Malaysia) Soh W Y	21	21
(Czech Republic) J Král (Czech Republic) O Král	14	19
6	(Indonesia) S K Gutama (Indonesia) M R P Isfahani	21	21
(France) C Popov (France) T J Popov	12	15

Quarter-finals
1	(Malaysia) A Chia (Malaysia) Soh W Y	21	14	17
6	(Indonesia) S K Gutama (Indonesia) M R P Isfahani	11	21	21

==== Section 2 ====
First round
3	(Malaysia) Man W C (Malaysia) Tee K W	21	19	21
(Malaysia) J Arif (Malaysia) Yap R K	16	21	16
(Indonesia) L R Carnando (Indonesia) B Maulana	21	21
(Malaysia) Ong Y S (Malaysia) Teo E Y	16	17
5	(Indonesia) F Alfian (Indonesia) M S Fikri	21	24
(Malaysia) N M Azriyn A (Malaysia) Tan W K	16	22
(Germany) B Geiss (Germany) J R Jansen	15	22	21
(France) M Cattoen (France) L Renoir	21	20	19

Second round
3	(Malaysia) Man W C (Malaysia) Tee K W	21	17	22
(Indonesia) L R Carnando (Indonesia) B Maulana	9	21	20
5	(Indonesia) F Alfian (Indonesia) M S Fikri	21	16	21
(Germany) B Geiss (Germany) J R Jansen	17	21	13

Quarter-finals
3	(Malaysia) Man W C (Malaysia) Tee K W	26	21
5	(Indonesia) F Alfian (Indonesia) M S Fikri	24	19

=== Bottom half ===
==== Section 3 ====
First round
(England) O Butler (England) S Jones	21	21
(Brazil) F Farias (Brazil) D Silva	19	19
(Chinese Taipei) Chiu H-c (Chinese Taipei) Wang C-l	13	21	21
7	(England) B Lane (England) S Vendy	21	16	19
(Spain) R García (Spain) C Piris	21	14	13
(Canada) J Lai (Canada) N Yakura	18	21	21
Q3	(Switzerland) Y Orteu (Switzerland) M Q Pham	13	9
4	(Denmark) K Astrup (Denmark) A S Rasmussen	21	21

Second round
(England) O Butler (England) S Jones	16	15
(Chinese Taipei) Chiu H-c (Chinese Taipei) Wang C-l	21	21
(Canada) J Lai (Canada) N Yakura	8	14
4	(Denmark) K Astrup (Denmark) A S Rasmussen	21	21

Quarter-finals
(Chinese Taipei) Chiu H-c (Chinese Taipei) Wang C-l	21	21
4	(Denmark) K Astrup (Denmark) A S Rasmussen	17	19

==== Section 4 ====
First round
(Indonesia) M R Ardianto (Indonesia) R Hidayat	17	21	21
Q1	(Denmark) R Espersen (Denmark) A Søndergaard	21	14	14
Q4	(Spain) J Fernandez (Spain) A Perals	20	6
8	(Chinese Taipei) Lee J-h (Chinese Taipei) Yang P-h	22	21
(France) J Maio (France) W Villeger	21	19
(Denmark) D Lundgaard (Denmark) M Vestergaard	23	21
(Scotland) A Dunn (Scotland) A Pringle	17	20
2	(Malaysia) Goh S F (Malaysia) N Izzuddin	21	22

Second round
(Indonesia) M R Ardianto (Indonesia) R Hidayat	21	16	18
8	(Chinese Taipei) Lee J-h (Chinese Taipei) Yang P-h	15	21	21
(Denmark) D Lundgaard (Denmark) M Vestergaard	21	21
2	(Malaysia) Goh S F (Malaysia) N Izzuddin	9	19

Quarter-finals
8	(Chinese Taipei) Lee J-h (Chinese Taipei) Yang P-h	21	15	21
(Denmark) D Lundgaard (Denmark) M Vestergaard	12	21	18

== Women's doubles ==
=== Seeds ===
1. (Bulgaria) Gabriela Stoeva / Stefani Stoeva (quarter-finals)
2. (Chinese Taipei) Hsu Yin-hui / Lin Jhih-yun (final)
3. (Chinese Taipei) Chang Ching-hui / Yang Ching-tun (semi-finals)
4. (Malaysia) Go Pei Kee / Teoh Mei Xing (quarter-finals)
5. (Ukraine) Polina Buhrova / Yevheniia Kantemyr (quarter-finals)
6. (Malaysia) Ong Xin Yee / Carmen Ting (quarter-finals)
7. (France) Margot Lambert / Camille Pognante (champions)
8. (Turkey) Bengisu Erçetin / Nazlıcan İnci (semi-finals)

=== Finals ===
Semi-finals
7	(France) Margot Lambert (France) Camille Pognante	21	21
3	(Chinese Taipei) Chang Ching-hui (Chinese Taipei) Yang Ching-tun	19	16
8	(Turkey) Bengisu Erçetin (Turkey) Nazlıcan İnci	26	15
2	(Chinese Taipei) Hsu Yin-hui (Chinese Taipei) Lin Jhih-yun	28	21

Final
7	(France) Margot Lambert (France) Camille Pognante	21	21
2	(Chinese Taipei) Hsu Yin-hui (Chinese Taipei) Lin Jhih-yun	16	10

=== Top half ===
==== Section 1 ====
First round
(Switzerland) L Amiguet (Switzerland) C Racloz	11	19
(Denmark) N P Anthonisen (Denmark) A C Kudsk	21	21
(Poland) J Piwowar (Poland) D Zimnol	13	12
(Brazil) J Lima (Brazil) S Lima	21	21

Second round
1	(Bulgaria) G Stoeva (Bulgaria) S Stoeva	21	21
(Denmark) N P Anthonisen (Denmark) A C Kudsk	7	13
7	(France) M Lambert (France) C Pognante	21	21
(Brazil) J Lima (Brazil) S Lima	12	14

Quarter-finals
1	(Bulgaria) G Stoeva (Bulgaria) S Stoeva	18	21	13
7	(France) M Lambert (France) C Pognante	21	16	21

==== Section 2 ====
First round
(Denmark) K Vang (Denmark) M Werge	17	16
(Scotland) J MacPherson (Scotland) C Torrance	21	21
5	(Ukraine) P Buhrova (Ukraine) Y Kantemyr	21	21
(Austria) S Au Yeong (Austria) A Hagspiel	11	16
(Netherlands) K de Wit (Netherlands) M Loos	17	17
(Germany) S Hübsch (Germany) A Lehmann	21	21

Second round
3	(Chinese Taipei) Chang C-h (Chinese Taipei) Yang C-t	21	21
(Scotland) J MacPherson (Scotland) C Torrance	17	17
5	(Ukraine) P Buhrova (Ukraine) Y Kantemyr	21	21
(Germany) S Hübsch (Germany) A Lehmann	14	10

Quarter-finals
3	(Chinese Taipei) Chang C-h (Chinese Taipei) Yang C-t	21	11	21
5	(Ukraine) P Buhrova (Ukraine) Y Kantemyr	19	21	9

=== Bottom half ===
==== Section 3 ====
First round
(Canada) C Choi (Canada) C Lai	22	21
(Spain) P López (Spain) L Rodríguez	20	18
(England) A Harris (England) L Tolman	14	21
8	(Turkey) B Erçetin (Turkey) N İnci	21	23
(Chinese Taipei) Teng C-h (Chinese Taipei) Yang C-y	10	21	21
(Thailand) B Aimsaard (Thailand) S S Wedler	21	19	18

Second round
(Canada) C Choi (Canada) C Lai	9	14
8	(Turkey) B Erçetin (Turkey) N İnci	21	21
(Chinese Taipei) Teng C-h (Chinese Taipei) Yang C-y	21	21	22
4	(Malaysia) Go P K (Malaysia) Teoh M X	9	23	24

Quarter-finals
8	(Turkey) B Erçetin (Turkey) N İnci	21	14
4	(Malaysia) Go P K (Malaysia) Teoh M X	13	13^{r}

==== Section 4 ====
First round
(Spain) N Carulla (Spain) C M Jimenez	w	/	o
(Denmark) S Pilgaard (Denmark) S Schulz
(Switzerland) A Müller (Netherlands) K van Buiten	8	14
(England) L Curtin (England) S Kelly	21	21

Second round
(Spain) N Carulla (Spain) C M Jimenez	23	14
6	(Malaysia) Ong X Y (Malaysia) C Ting	25	21
(England) L Curtin (England) S Kelly	17	11
2	(Chinese Taipei) Hsu Y-h (Chinese Taipei) Lin J-y	21	21

Quarter-finals
6	(Malaysia) Ong X Y (Malaysia) C Ting	17	16
2	(Chinese Taipei) Hsu Y-h (Chinese Taipei) Lin J-y	21	21

== Mixed doubles ==
=== Seeds ===
1. (Malaysia) Chen Tang Jie / Toh Ee Wei (withdrew)
2. (France) Thom Gicquel / Delphine Delrue (final)
3. (Denmark) Jesper Toft / Amalie Magelund (quarter-finals)
4. (Indonesia) Jafar Hidayatullah / Felisha Pasaribu (quarter-finals)
5. (Denmark) Mathias Christiansen / Alexandra Bøje (champions)
6. (Thailand) Ruttanapak Oupthong / Jhenicha Sudjaipraparat (semi-finals)
7. (Chinese Taipei) Yang Po-hsuan / Hu Ling-fang (second round)
8. (Indonesia) Amri Syahnawi / Nita Violina Marwah (second round)

=== Finals ===
Semi-finals
5	(Denmark) Mathias Christiansen (Denmark) Alexandra Bøje	21	21
(Spain) Rubén García (Spain) Lucía Rodríguez	12	12
6	(Thailand) Ruttanapak Oupthong (Thailand) Jhenicha Sudjaipraparat	9	21	16
2	(France) Thom Gicquel (France) Delphine Delrue	21	13	21

Final
5	(Denmark) Mathias Christiansen (Denmark) Alexandra Bøje	23	21
2	(France) Thom Gicquel (France) Delphine Delrue	21	15

=== Top half ===
==== Section 1 ====
First round
3	(Denmark) J Toft (Denmark) A Magelund	21	21
PFQ	(Germany) P Volkmann (Germany) F Volkmann	17	11
(England) S Jones (England) L Tolman	13	13
(Indonesia) A Maulana (Indonesia) I C S Jamil	21	21
5	(Denmark) M Christiansen (Denmark) A Bøje	21	21
Q4	(Netherlands) B Wassink (Netherlands) D Jille	3	9
(India) R Kapoor (India) R Gadde	21	21
(Canada) J Lai (Canada) C Lai	18	13

Second round
3	(Denmark) J Toft (Denmark) A Magelund	21	19	21
(Indonesia) A Maulana (Indonesia) I C S Jamil	10	21	14
5	(Denmark) M Christiansen (Denmark) A Bøje	21	21
(India) R Kapoor (India) R Gadde	16	11

Quarter-finals
3	(Denmark) J Toft (Denmark) A Magelund	17	20
5	(Denmark) M Christiansen (Denmark) A Bøje	21	22

==== Section 2 ====
First round
7	(Chinese Taipei) Yang P-h (Chinese Taipei) Hu L-f	21	22
(England) C Hemming (England) E van Leeuwen	11	20
Q1	(Bulgaria) E Panev (Bulgaria) G Stoeva	12	7
(France) J Maio (France) L Palermo	21	21
SWM	(Chinese Taipei) Ye H-w (Chinese Taipei) N G Chan	21	14	21
(Brazil) D Silva (Brazil) S Lima	19	21	17
(Spain) R García (Spain) L Rodríguez	21	19	21
(Czech Republic) O Král (Czech Republic) T Švábíková	15	21	8

Second round
7	(Chinese Taipei) Yang P-h (Chinese Taipei) Hu L-f	24	22	19
(France) J Maio (France) L Palermo	22	24	21
SWM	(Chinese Taipei) Ye H-w (Chinese Taipei) N G Chan	14	20
(Spain) R García (Spain) L Rodríguez	21	22

Quarter-finals
(France) J Maio (France) L Palermo	21	14
(Spain) R García (Spain) L Rodríguez	23	21

=== Bottom half ===
==== Section 3 ====
First round
(Malaysia) Wong T C (Malaysia) Lim C S	21	21
(Brazil) F Farias (Brazil) J Lima	14	17
(Thailand) P Horbanluekit (Thailand) B Aimsaard	14	13
6	(Thailand) R Oupthong (Thailand) J Sudjaipraparat	21	21
(Chinese Taipei) Chen C-k (Chinese Taipei) Hsu Y-h	21	21
Q3	(Switzerland) Y Orteu (Switzerland) C Racloz	12	10
(Denmark) K Kolding (Denmark) M Werge	11	12
4	(Indonesia) J Hidayatullah (Indonesia) F Pasaribu	21	21

Second round
(Malaysia) Wong T C (Malaysia) Lim C S	13	10
6	(Thailand) R Oupthong (Thailand) J Sudjaipraparat	21	21
(Chinese Taipei) Chen C-k (Chinese Taipei) Hsu Y-h	18	16
4	(Indonesia) J Hidayatullah (Indonesia) F Pasaribu	21	21

Quarter-finals
6	(Thailand) R Oupthong (Thailand) J Sudjaipraparat	21	21
4	(Indonesia) J Hidayatullah (Indonesia) F Pasaribu	14	13

==== Section 4 ====
First round
(Denmark) R Espersen (Denmark) A C Kudsk	13	16
(Germany) M Seidel (Germany) T P Nguyen	21	21
(Ukraine) O Titov (Ukraine) Y Kantemyr	14	12
8	(Indonesia) A Syahnawi (Indonesia) N V Marwah	21	21
(Denmark) M Vestergaard (Denmark) C Busch	w	/	o
(Scotland) A Dunn (Scotland) J MacPherson
Q2	(Germany) S Krax (Germany) A Lehmann	14	18
2	(France) T Gicquel (France) D Delrue	21	21

Second round
(Germany) M Seidel (Germany) T P Nguyen	21	22
8	(Indonesia) A Syahnawi (Indonesia) N V Marwah	17	20
(Denmark) M Vestergaard (Denmark) C Busch	19	13
2	(France) T Gicquel (France) D Delrue	21	21

Quarter-finals
(Germany) M Seidel (Germany) T P Nguyen	11	13
2	(France) T Gicquel (France) D Delrue	21	21

Preceded by 2025 French Open; 2025 Indonesia Masters Super 100 II	BWF World Tour; 2025 BWF season	Succeeded by 2025 Korea Masters
