= 2026 Arctic Open =

Tournament details
- Dates: 6–11 October
- Edition: 26th
- Level: Super 500
- Total prize money: US$500,000
- Venue: Energia Areena
- Location: Vantaa, Finland

Champions
- Men's singles: (Denmark) Anders Antonsen
- Women's singles: (Denmark) Mia Blichfeldt
- Men's doubles: (Malaysia) Aaron Tai (Malaysia) Yap Roy King
- Women's doubles: (China) Chen Fanshutian (China) Luo Xumin
- Mixed doubles: (China) Jiang Zhenbang (China) Wei Yaxin
- Official website: arcticopen.fi

The 2026 Arctic Open (officially known as the Clash of Clans Arctic Open 2026 powered by Yonex for sponsorship reasons) was a badminton tournament that took place at Energia Areena in Vantaa, Finland, from 6 to 11 October 2026 with a total purse of $500,000.

== Tournament ==
The 2026 Arctic Open was the twenty-fourth tournament of the 2026 BWF World Tour and also part of the Arctic Open championships (previously known as Finnish Open), which had been held since 1990. This tournament was organized by Badminton Finland and sanctioned by the BWF.

=== Venue ===
This tournament was held at Energia Areena in Vantaa, Finland.

=== Point distribution ===
Below was the point distribution table for each phase of the tournament based on the BWF points system for the BWF World Tour Super 500 event.

| Winner | Runner-up | 3/4 | 5/8 | 9/16 | 17/32 | 33/64 | 65/128 |
|---|---|---|---|---|---|---|---|
| 9,200 | 7,800 | 6,420 | 5,040 | 3,600 | 2,220 | 880 | 430 |

=== Prize pool ===
The total prize money was US$500,000 with the distribution of the prize money in accordance with BWF regulations.

| Event | Winner | Finalist | Semi-finals | Quarter-finals | Last 16 |
| Singles | $37,500 | $19,000 | $7,250 | $3,000 | $1,750 |
| Doubles | $39,500 | $19,000 | $7,000 | $3,625 | $1,875 |

== Men's singles ==
=== Seeds ===
1. (Thailand) Kunlavut Vitidsarn (quarter-finals)
2. (France) Christo Popov (quarter-finals)
3. (Chinese Taipei) Chou Tien-chen (quarter-finals)
4. (Denmark) Anders Antonsen (champion)
5. (Chinese Taipei) Lin Chun-yi (first round)
6. (China) Li Shifeng (second round)
7. (France) Toma Junior Popov (second round)
8. (Japan) Koki Watanabe (semi-finals)

=== Finals ===
Semi-finals
(Japan) Yushi Tanaka | 21 | 11 | 21
8 | (Japan) Koki Watanabe | 14 | 21 | 16
4 | (Denmark) Anders Antonsen | 21 | 15 | 21
Q2 | (Malaysia) Lee Zii Jia | 11 | 21 | 16

Final
(Japan) Yushi Tanaka | 21 | 16 | 25
4 | (Denmark) Anders Antonsen | 16 | 21 | 27

=== Top half ===
==== Section 1 ====
First round
1 | (Thailand) K Vitidsarn | 21 | 21
Q1 | (China) Zhu XC | 19 | 9
Q3 | (India) R Chouhan | 22 | 20 | 17
(China) Weng HY | 20 | 22 | 21
7 | (France) T J Popov | 21 | 21
(Denmark) R Gemke | 18 | 18
WC | (Finland) J Oldorff | 13 | 13
(Japan) Y Tanaka | 21 | 21

Second round
1 | (Thailand) K Vitidsarn | 10 | 21 | 21
(China) Weng HY | 21 | 11 | 13
7 | (France) T J Popov | 10 | 19
(Japan) Y Tanaka | 21 | 21

Quarter-finals
1 | (Thailand) K Vitidsarn | 21 | 13 | 16
(Japan) Y Tanaka | 14 | 21 | 21

==== Section 2 ====
First round
3 | (Chinese Taipei) Chou T-c | 21 | 19 | 21
(France) A Merklé | 13 | 21 | 13
(Japan) Y Okimoto | 21 | 21
PFQ | (Japan) M Koga | 13 | 8
8 | (Japan) K Watanabe | 21 | 21
(Chinese Taipei) Wang T-w | 14 | 18
(India) S Kidambi | 21 | 15 | 13
(Canada) B Yang | 15 | 21 | 21

Second round
3 | (Chinese Taipei) Chou T-c | 21 | 21
(Japan) Y Okimoto | 16 | 19
8 | (Japan) K Watanabe | 21 | 20 | 21
(Canada) B Yang | 17 | 22 | 15

Quarter-finals
3 | (Chinese Taipei) Chou T-c | 19 | 16
8 | (Japan) K Watanabe | 21 | 21

=== Bottom half ===
==== Section 3 ====
First round
(Chinese Taipei) Lee C-h | 10 | 14
(China) Hu ZA | 21 | 21
(Chinese Taipei) Chi Y-j | 13 | 16
6 | (China) Li SF | 21 | 21
(Republic of Ireland) N Nguyen | 21 | 16 | 21
(Singapore) J Teh | 14 | 21 | 23
(India) Prannoy H. S. | 10 | 9
4 | (Denmark) A Antonsen | 21 | 21

Second round
(China) Hu ZA | 21 | 21
6 | (China) Li SF | 10 | 16
(Singapore) J Teh | 18 | 14
4 | (Denmark) A Antonsen | 21 | 21

Quarter-finals
(China) Hu ZA | 20 | 19
4 | (Denmark) A Antonsen | 22 | 21

==== Section 4 ====
First round
Q2 | (Malaysia) Lee Z J | 21 | 21
(China) Dong TY | 18 | 14
(Chinese Taipei) Su L-y | 21 | 21
5 | (Chinese Taipei) Lin C-y | 17 | 6
(Denmark) M Johannesen | 16 | 14
Q4 | (India) T Mannepalli | 21 | 21
(Hong Kong) J Gunawan | 12 | 21 | 8
2 | (France) C Popov | 21 | 18 | 21

Second round
Q2 | (Malaysia) Lee Z J | 21 | 21
(Chinese Taipei) Su L-y | 17 | 12
Q4 | (India) T Mannepalli | 14 | 19
2 | (France) C Popov | 21 | 21

Quarter-finals
Q2 | (Malaysia) Lee Z J | 21 | 21
2 | (France) C Popov | 11 | 16

== Women's singles ==
=== Seeds ===
1. (Thailand) Ratchanok Intanon (final)
2. (Japan) Tomoka Miyazaki (quarter-finals)
3. (China) Han Yue (quarter-finals)
4. (Thailand) Pornpawee Chochuwong (quarter-finals)
5. (Japan) Nozomi Okuhara (semi-finals)
6. (India) P. V. Sindhu (quarter-finals)
7. (Denmark) Line Christophersen (semi-finals)
8. (Denmark) Mia Blichfeldt (champion)

=== Finals ===
Semi-finals
1 | (Thailand) Ratchanok Intanon | 17 | 21 | 21
7 | (Denmark) Line Christophersen | 21 | 10 | 13
8 | (Denmark) Mia Blichfeldt | 21 | 21
5 | (Japan) Nozomi Okuhara | 11 | 7

Final
1 | (Thailand) Ratchanok Intanon | 17 | 13
8 | (Denmark) Mia Blichfeldt | 21 | 21

=== Top half ===
==== Section 1 ====
First round
1 | (Thailand) R Intanon | 21 | 21
(India) I Baruah | 10 | 15
(India) T Sharma | 21 | 21
(Chinese Taipei) Chiu P-c | 15 | 17
6 | (India) P. V. Sindhu | 21 | 21
Q2 | (Canada) W Y Zhang | 8 | 11
(Chinese Taipei) Lin H-t | 16 | 21 | 16
(Japan) R Gunji | 21 | 19 | 21

Second round
1 | (Thailand) R Intanon | 21 | 21
(India) T Sharma | 18 | 7
6 | (India) P. V. Sindhu | 21 | 21
(Japan) R Gunji | 15 | 15

Quarter-finals
1 | (Thailand) R Intanon | 21 | 19 | 21
6 | (India) P. V. Sindhu | 11 | 21 | 18

==== Section 2 ====
First round
4 | (Thailand) P Chochuwong | 21 | 21
Q1 | (Germany) Y Li | 14 | 12
(Japan) H Akechi | 21 | 18 | 22
(Denmark) A Schulz | 7 | 21 | 24
7 | (Denmark) L Christophersen | 21 | 14 | 26
(India) A Chaliha | 7 | 21 | 24
Q4 | (Hong Kong) Lo S Y | 21 | 18 | 21
(Denmark) L Kjærsfeldt | 10 | 21 | 19

Second round
4 | (Thailand) P Chochuwong | 21 | 21
(Denmark) A Schulz | 12 | 15
7 | (Denmark) L Christophersen | 21 | 21
Q4 | (Hong Kong) Lo S Y | 15 | 8

Quarter-finals
4 | (Thailand) P Chochuwong | 21 | 14 | 19
7 | (Denmark) L Christophersen | 18 | 21 | 21

=== Bottom half ===
==== Section 3 ====
First round
(Vietnam) Nguyễn T L | 19 | 21 | 21
(Singapore) Yeo J M | 21 | 19 | 15
WC | (Finland) P Saarnivaara | 4 | 8
8 | (Denmark) M Blichfeldt | 21 | 21
Q3 | (India) M Bansod | 18 | 13
(Scotland) K Gilmour | 21 | 21
(Thailand) S Katethong | 16 | 21 | 18
3 | (China) Han Y | 21 | 18 | 21

Second round
(Vietnam) Nguyễn T L | 19 | 21
8 | (Denmark) M Blichfeldt | 21 | 23
(Scotland) K Gilmour | 10 | 11
3 | (China) Han Y | 21 | 21

Quarter-finals
8 | (Denmark) M Blichfeldt | 21 | 24
3 | (China) Han Y | 18 | 22

==== Section 4 ====
First round
(Chinese Taipei) Huang Y-h | 12 | 21 | 15
(Turkey) N Arın | 21 | 11 | 21
(Bulgaria) K Nalbantova | 19 | 21 | 18
5 | (Japan) N Okuhara | 21 | 19 | 21
(India) U Hooda | 16 | 21 | 22
(China) Han QX | 21 | 15 | 24
(Japan) N Nidaira | 13 | 14
2 | (Japan) T Miyazaki | 21 | 21

Second round
(Turkey) N Arın | 13 | 11
5 | (Japan) N Okuhara | 21 | 21
(China) Han QX | 9 | 13
2 | (Japan) T Miyazaki | 21 | 21

Quarter-finals
5 | (Japan) N Okuhara | 17 | 21 | 21
2 | (Japan) T Miyazaki | 21 | 17 | 19

== Men's doubles ==
=== Seeds ===
1. (England) Ben Lane / Sean Vendy (first round)
2. (Japan) Takuro Hoki / Yugo Kobayashi (quarter-finals)
3. (Denmark) Daniel Lundgaard / Mads Vestergaard (first round)
4. (Chinese Taipei) Chiu Hsiang-chieh / Wang Chi-lin (first round)
5. (China) He Jiting / Ren Xiangyu (first round)
6. (Denmark) Kim Astrup / Anders Skaarup Rasmussen (first round)
7. (Chinese Taipei) Lee Fang-chih / Lee Fang-jen (second round)
8. (China) Hu Keyuan / Lin Xiangyi (first round)

=== Finals ===
Semi-finals
(Denmark) Christian Faust Kjær (Denmark) Rasmus Kjær | 14 | 16
(Malaysia) Aaron Tai (Malaysia) Yap Roy King | 21 | 21
PFQ | (Chinese Taipei) Lai Po-yu (Chinese Taipei) Tsai Fu-cheng | 21 | 19 | 21
(France) Julien Maio (France) William Villeger | 15 | 21 | 13

Final
(Malaysia) Aaron Tai (Malaysia) Yap Roy King | 21 | 21
PFQ | (Chinese Taipei) Lai Po-yu (Chinese Taipei) Tsai Fu-cheng | 19 | 19

=== Top half ===
==== Section 1 ====
First round
1 | (England) B Lane (England) S Vendy | 11 | 21 | 14
(Denmark) C F Kjær (Denmark) R Kjær | 21 | 12 | 21
Q2 | (Sweden) M Molin (Sweden) M Svensson | 9 | 15
(France) C Popov (France) T J Popov | 21 | 21
5 | (China) He JT (China) Ren XY | 21 | 18 | 20
(India) K P Garaga (India) P Roy | 10 | 21 | 22
(England) O Butler (England) S Jones | 22 | 21
(Japan) K Kumagai (Japan) H Nishi | 20 | 18

Second round
(Denmark) C F Kjær (Denmark) R Kjær | 21 | 21
(France) C Popov (France) T J Popov | 17 | 12
(India) K P Garaga (India) P Roy | 21 | 22
(England) O Butler (England) S Jones | 19 | 20

Quarter-finals
(Denmark) C F Kjær (Denmark) R Kjær | 21 | 21
(India) K P Garaga (India) P Roy | 13 | 14

==== Section 2 ====
First round
3 | (Denmark) D Lundgaard (Denmark) M Vestergaard | 17 | 21 | 17
(Thailand) P Sukhpun (Thailand) P Teeraratsakul | 21 | 18 | 21
Q3 | (Finland) J Honkanen (Finland) J Paul | 8 | 8
(Scotland) C Grimley (Scotland) M Grimley | 21 | 21
7 | (Chinese Taipei) Lee F-c (Chinese Taipei) Lee F-j | 21 | 21
Q4 | (Italy) A Gozzini (Italy) L Zhou | 8 | 10
(Malaysia) A Tai (Malaysia) Yap R K | 21 | 21
(Malaysia) N M Azriyn A (Malaysia) Tan W K | 12 | 13

Second round
(Thailand) P Sukhpun (Thailand) P Teeraratsakul | 21 | 21
(Scotland) C Grimley (Scotland) M Grimley | 18 | 11
7 | (Chinese Taipei) Lee F-c (Chinese Taipei) Lee F-j | 19 | 11
(Malaysia) A Tai (Malaysia) Yap R K | 21 | 21

Quarter-finals
(Thailand) P Sukhpun (Thailand) P Teeraratsakul | 13 | 19
(Malaysia) A Tai (Malaysia) Yap R K | 21 | 21

=== Bottom half ===
==== Section 3 ====
First round
Q1 | (Lithuania) D Beržanskis (Lithuania) D Paksys | 12 | 12
(Malaysia) Chia W J (Malaysia) Teo E Y | 21 | 21
PFQ | (Chinese Taipei) Lai P-y (Chinese Taipei) Tsai F-c | 21 | 21
6 | (Denmark) K Astrup (Denmark) A S Rasmussen | 15 | 17
PFQ | (Denmark) R Nebel (Denmark) J Søby | 23 | 14 | 21
(Japan) H Okamura (Japan) K Yamashita | 21 | 21 | 16
(Chinese Taipei) Chen Z-r (Chinese Taipei) Lin Y-c | 21 | 22
4 | (Chinese Taipei) Chiu H-c (Chinese Taipei) Wang C-l | 18 | 20

Second round
(Malaysia) Chia W J (Malaysia) Teo E Y | 22 | 20 | 16
PFQ | (Chinese Taipei) Lai P-y (Chinese Taipei) Tsai F-c | 20 | 22 | 21
PFQ | (Denmark) R Nebel (Denmark) J Søby | 21 | 14 | 21
(Chinese Taipei) Chen Z-r (Chinese Taipei) Lin Y-c | 14 | 21 | 14

Quarter-finals
PFQ | (Chinese Taipei) Lai P-y (Chinese Taipei) Tsai F-c | 21 | 21
PFQ | (Denmark) R Nebel (Denmark) J Søby | 19 | 17

==== Section 4 ====
First round
PFQ | (Scotland) A Dunn (Scotland) A Pringle | 21 | 14 | 21
(England) A Green (England) Z Russ | 15 | 21 | 15
(France) J Maio (France) W Villeger | 22 | 26
8 | (China) Hu KY (China) Lin XY | 20 | 24
(Czech Republic) J Král (Czech Republic) O Král | 17 | 21 | 13
(Chinese Taipei) Chen C-k (Chinese Taipei) Liu K-h | 21 | 18 | 21
(Germany) B Geiss (Germany) J R Jansen | 9 | 12
2 | (Japan) T Hoki (Japan) Y Kobayashi | 21 | 21

Second round
PFQ | (Scotland) A Dunn (Scotland) A Pringle | 18 | 19
(France) J Maio (France) W Villeger | 21 | 21
(Chinese Taipei) Chen C-k (Chinese Taipei) Liu K-h | 21 | 16 | 13
2 | (Japan) T Hoki (Japan) Y Kobayashi | 19 | 21 | 21

Quarter-finals
(France) J Maio (France) W Villeger | 21 | 21
2 | (Japan) T Hoki (Japan) Y Kobayashi | 13 | 13

== Women's doubles ==
=== Seeds ===
1. (Japan) Rin Iwanaga / Kie Nakanishi (second round)
2. (Chinese Taipei) Hsu Yin-hui / Lin Jhih-yun (final)
3. (Bulgaria) Gabriela Stoeva / Stefani Stoeva (quarter-finals)
4. (Japan) Rui Hirokami / Sayaka Hobara (first round)
5. (China) Bao Lijing / Cao Zihan (semi-finals)
6. (Japan) Sumire Nakade / Miyu Takahashi (second round)
7. (Japan) Sayaka Hirota / Ayako Sakuramoto (quarter-finals)
8. (Chinese Taipei) Hsu Ya-ching / Sung Yu-hsuan (semi-finals)

=== Finals ===
Semi-finals
(China) Chen Fanshutian (China) Luo Xumin | 21 | 21
8 | (Chinese Taipei) Hsu Ya-ching (Chinese Taipei) Sung Yu-hsuan | 14 | 19
5 | (China) Bao Lijing (China) Cao Zihan | 21 | 14 | 18
2 | (Chinese Taipei) Hsu Yin-hui (Chinese Taipei) Lin Jhih-yun | 17 | 21 | 21

Final
(China) Chen Fanshutian (China) Luo Xumin | 21 | 21
2 | (Chinese Taipei) Hsu Yin-hui (Chinese Taipei) Lin Jhih-yun | 18 | 19

=== Top half ===
==== Section 1 ====
First round
1 | (Japan) R Iwanaga (Japan) K Nakanishi | 21 | 21
(China) Li YJ (China) Wang YD | 14 | 16
Q2 | (Finland) S A Brahmakal (Finland) A Övermark | 4 | 2
(China) Chen FST (China) Luo XM | 21 | 21
7 | (Japan) S Hirota (Japan) A Sakuramoto | 21 | 21
Q3 | (Lithuania) J Kavaliauskaitė (Lithuania) J Šalnaitė | 7 | 4
(Denmark) K Vang (Denmark) M Werge | 21 | 21
(Austria) S Dlapka (Austria) L Rumpold | 13 | 8

Second round
1 | (Japan) R Iwanaga (Japan) K Nakanishi | 7 | 20
(China) Chen FST (China) Luo XM | 21 | 22
7 | (Japan) S Hirota (Japan) A Sakuramoto | 24 | 21
(Denmark) K Vang (Denmark) M Werge | 22 | 14

Quarter-finals
(China) Chen FST (China) Luo XM | 21 | 12 | 21
7 | (Japan) S Hirota (Japan) A Sakuramoto | 18 | 21 | 11

==== Section 2 ====
First round
4 | (Japan) R Hirokami (Japan) S Hobara | 16 | 21 | 19
(China) Luo Y (China) Wang TG | 21 | 13 | 21
(England) A Harris (England) E van Leeuwen | 14 | 21 | 21
(United States) L Lam (United States) A Lee | 21 | 19 | 19
8 | (Chinese Taipei) Hsu Y-c (Chinese Taipei) Sung Y-h | 21 | 21
(Chinese Taipei) Chen Y-f (Chinese Taipei) Hsieh P-s | 8 | 18
(Chinese Taipei) Chang C-h (Chinese Taipei) Yang C-t | 21 | 21
(England) S Kelly (England) L Tolman | 13 | 17

Second round
(China) Luo Y (China) Wang TG | 21 | 17 | 22
(England) A Harris (England) E van Leeuwen | 18 | 21 | 20
8 | (Chinese Taipei) Hsu Y-c (Chinese Taipei) Sung Y-h | 12 | 21 | 21
(Chinese Taipei) Chang C-h (Chinese Taipei) Yang C-t | 21 | 16 | 15

Quarter-finals
(China) Luo Y (China) Wang TG | 19 | 17
8 | (Chinese Taipei) Hsu Y-c (Chinese Taipei) Sung Y-h | 21 | 21

=== Bottom half ===
==== Section 3 ====
First round
(Republic of Ireland) O Flynn (Republic of Ireland) S Flynn | 15 | 18
(Germany) L Michalski (Denmark) S Schulz | 21 | 21
(Scotland) J MacPherson (Scotland) C Torrance | 14 | 19
5 | (China) Bao LJ (China) Cao ZH | 21 | 21
(Sweden) F Hallberg (Sweden) E Öhling | 16 | 16
(Italy) M Corsini (Italy) E Piccinin | 21 | 21
Q4 | (Germany) S Küspert (Germany) I Lohau | 10 | 11
3 | (Bulgaria) G Stoeva (Bulgaria) S Stoeva | 21 | 21

Second round
(Germany) L Michalski (Denmark) S Schulz | 10 | 12
5 | (China) Bao LJ (China) Cao ZH | 21 | 21
(Italy) M Corsini (Italy) E Piccinin | 10 | 7
3 | (Bulgaria) G Stoeva (Bulgaria) S Stoeva | 21 | 21

Quarter-finals
5 | (China) Bao LJ (China) Cao ZH | 21 | 17 | 21
3 | (Bulgaria) G Stoeva (Bulgaria) S Stoeva | 14 | 21 | 15

==== Section 4 ====
First round
(Chinese Taipei) Lin C-c (Chinese Taipei) Yang C-y | 21 | 21
(Germany) S Hübsch (Germany) A Lehmann | 10 | 5
(Poland) P Cybulska (Poland) K Marczak | 7 | 15
6 | (Japan) S Nakade (Japan) M Takahashi | 21 | 21
(Denmark) L Hvid (Denmark) A Klausholm | 17 | 17
(Ukraine) P Buhrova (Ukraine) Y Kantemyr | 21 | 21
Q1 | (Denmark) A C Kudsk (Denmark) S Pilgaard | 11 | 11
2 | (Chinese Taipei) Hsu Y-h (Chinese Taipei) Lin J-y | 21 | 21

Second round
(Chinese Taipei) Lin C-c (Chinese Taipei) Yang C-y | 21 | 19 | 21
6 | (Japan) S Nakade (Japan) M Takahashi | 18 | 21 | 16
(Ukraine) P Buhrova (Ukraine) Y Kantemyr | 13 | 12
2 | (Chinese Taipei) Hsu Y-h (Chinese Taipei) Lin J-y | 21 | 21

Quarter-finals
(Chinese Taipei) Lin C-c (Chinese Taipei) Yang C-y | 14 | 22 | 19
2 | (Chinese Taipei) Hsu Y-h (Chinese Taipei) Lin J-y | 21 | 20 | 21

== Mixed doubles ==
=== Seeds ===
1. (China) Feng Yanzhe / Huang Dongping (semi-finals)
2. (Denmark) Mathias Christiansen / Alexandra Bøje (withdrew)
3. (China) Jiang Zhenbang / Wei Yaxin (champions)
4. (Thailand) Dechapol Puavaranukroh / Supissara Paewsampran (first round)
5. (China) Guo Xinwa / Chen Fanghui (second round)
6. (Chinese Taipei) Ye Hong-wei / Nicole Gonzales Chan (quarter-finals)
7. (China) Cheng Xing / Zhang Chi (first round)
8. (Malaysia) Goh Soon Huat / Shevon Jemie Lai (first round)

=== Finals ===
Semi-finals
1 | (China) Feng Yanzhe (China) Huang Dongping | 18 | 17
3 | (China) Jiang Zhenbang (China) Wei Yaxin | 21 | 21
(Chinese Taipei) Liu Kuang-heng (Chinese Taipei) Hsu Yin-hui | 11 | 14
(China) Gao Jiaxuan (China) Wu Mengying | 21 | 21

Final
3 | (China) Jiang Zhenbang (China) Wei Yaxin | 21 | 21
(China) Gao Jiaxuan (China) Wu Mengying | 18 | 16

=== Top half ===
==== Section 1 ====
First round
1 | (China) Feng YZ (China) Huang DP | 21 | 21
(Denmark) J Toft (Denmark) A C Kudsk | 11 | 9
(Malaysia) Hoo P R (Malaysia) Lai P J | 15 | 16
(Malaysia) Chen T J (Malaysia) Chan W T | 21 | 21
8 | (Malaysia) Goh S H (Malaysia) S J Lai | 27 | 18 | 15
(England) S Jones (England) L Tolman | 25 | 21 | 21
PFQ | (Germany) S Krax (Germany) A Lehmann | 17 | 9
Q3 | (Sweden) F Karlborg (Sweden) T Sjöö | 21 | 21

Second round
1 | (China) Feng YZ (China) Huang DP | 21 | 21
(Malaysia) Chen T J (Malaysia) Chan W T | 15 | 14
(England) S Jones (England) L Tolman | 14 | 17
Q3 | (Sweden) F Karlborg (Sweden) T Sjöö | 21 | 21

Quarter-finals
1 | (China) Feng YZ (China) Huang DP | 21 | 21
Q3 | (Sweden) F Karlborg (Sweden) T Sjöö | 7 | 17

==== Section 2 ====
First round
3 | (China) Jiang ZB (China) Wei YX | 21 | 21
Q2 | (Chinese Taipei) Tsai F-c (Chinese Taipei) Sung Y-h | 10 | 12
(Denmark) K Kolding (Denmark) M Werge | 21 | 15
(Scotland) A Dunn (Scotland) J MacPherson | 23 | 21
6 | (Chinese Taipei) Ye H-w (Chinese Taipei) N G Chan | 21 | 16 | 21
(Spain) R García (Spain) L Rodríguez | 17 | 21 | 16
(France) J Maio (France) L Palermo | 21 | 21
Q4 | (Sweden) M Molin (Sweden) E Öhling | 15 | 13

Second round
3 | (China) Jiang ZB (China) Wei YX | 21 | 21
(Scotland) A Dunn (Scotland) J MacPherson | 9 | 12
6 | (Chinese Taipei) Ye H-w (Chinese Taipei) N G Chan | 21 | 18 | 21
(France) J Maio (France) L Palermo | 12 | 21 | 12

Quarter-finals
3 | (China) Jiang ZB (China) Wei YX | 21 | 21
6 | (Chinese Taipei) Ye H-w (Chinese Taipei) N G Chan | 10 | 15

=== Bottom half ===
==== Section 3 ====
First round
(Chinese Taipei) Liu K-h (Chinese Taipei) Hsu Y-h | 21 | 12 | 21
PFQ | (Denmark) J Søby (Denmark) S Røjkjær | 17 | 21 | 11
PFQ | (India) I Bhatnagar (India) S Mishra | 3 | 6
SWM | (Thailand) P Teeraratsakul (Thailand) S Taerattanachai | 21 | 21
(China) Zhu YJ (China) Li Q | 21 | 12 | 21
(Chinese Taipei) Wu H-y (Chinese Taipei) Yang C-y | 6 | 21 | 19
(Malaysia) Wong T C (Malaysia) Lim C S | 15 | 18
5 | (China) Guo XW (China) Chen FH | 21 | 21

Second round
(Chinese Taipei) Liu K-h (Chinese Taipei) Hsu Y-h | 21 | 21
SWM | (Thailand) P Teeraratsakul (Thailand) S Taerattanachai | 12 | 17
(China) Zhu YJ (China) Li Q | 9
5 | (China) Guo XW (China) Chen FH | 4^{r}

Quarter-finals
(Chinese Taipei) Liu K-h (Chinese Taipei) Hsu Y-h | 19 | 21 | 21
(China) Zhu YJ (China) Li Q | 21 | 19 | 16

==== Section 4 ====
First round
(Chinese Taipei) Wu G-x (Chinese Taipei) Lee C-h | 20 | 13
(China) Gao JX (China) Wu MY | 22 | 21
(England) C Hemming (England) E van Leeuwen | 21 | 21
7 | (China) Cheng X (China) Zhang C | 17 | 17
Q1 | (Sweden) O Reuterhäll (Sweden) N Wang | 12 | 16
(Malaysia) J Wong (Malaysia) Cheng S Y | 21 | 21
(Japan) A Koga (Japan) N Saito | 6
4 | (Thailand) D Puavaranukroh (Thailand) S Paewsampran | 11^{r}

Second round
(China) Gao JX (China) Wu MY | 15 | 21 | 24
(England) C Hemming (England) E van Leeuwen | 21 | 14 | 22
(Malaysia) J Wong (Malaysia) Cheng S Y | 21 | 7 | 11
(Japan) A Koga (Japan) N Saito | 19 | 21 | 21

Quarter-finals
(China) Gao JX (China) Wu MY | 25 | 23
(Japan) A Koga (Japan) N Saito | 23 | 21

| Preceded by 2026 China Masters | BWF World Tour; 2026 BWF season | Succeeded by 2026 Denmark Open; 2026 Malaysia Super 100 |
