= Bendigo International =

Bendigo International can refer to several sporting events:

- Bendigo International (badminton), a badminton tournament
- Bendigo International (tennis), a ITF and ATP tennis tournament
