= Sydney International (badminton) =

Australian annual badminton championship

The Sydney International in badminton, is an international open held in Sydney, Australia. The event is part of the Badminton World Federation's International Series and part of the Badminton Oceania circuit.

== Previous winners ==
Year	Men's singles	Women's singles	Men's doubles	Women's doubles	Mixed doubles
1995	(Indonesia) Nunung Subandoro	(China) Han Jingna	(Indonesia) Davis Efraim (Indonesia) Halim Haryanto	(China) Peng Xinyong (China) Zhang Jin	(Indonesia) Halim Haryanto (Indonesia) Indarti Issolina
1996–2013	not held				
2014	(Japan) Riichi Takeshita	(Japan) Yuki Fukushima	(China) Bao Zilong (China) Qi Shuangshuang	(Japan) Yuki Fukushima (Japan) Sayaka Hirota	(Australia) Sawan Serasinghe (Australia) Setyana Mapasa
2015	(Vietnam) Nguyễn Tiến Minh	(Thailand) Pornpawee Chochuwong	(Malaysia) Jagdish Singh (Malaysia) Roni Tan Wee Long	(Thailand) Jongkolphan Kititharakul (Thailand) Rawinda Prajongjai	(Australia) Robin Middleton (Australia) Leanne Choo
2016	(Chinese Taipei) Lu Chia-hung	(Japan) Shiori Saito	(Chinese Taipei) Lee Fang-chih (Chinese Taipei) Lee Fang-jen	(Japan) Yuho Imai (Japan) Haruka Yonemoto	(Chinese Taipei) Yang Ming-tse (Chinese Taipei) Lee Chia-hsin
2017	(Chinese Taipei) Lin Chun-yi	(Chinese Taipei) Hung En-tzu	(Australia) Yohan Hadikusumo Wiratama (Australia) Albertus Susanto Njoto	(Chinese Taipei) Hung En-tzu (Chinese Taipei) Lin Jhih-yun	(Chinese Taipei) Ye Hong-wei (Chinese Taipei) Teng Chun-hsun
2018	(Japan) Riichi Takeshita	(Japan) Ayumi Mine	(Japan) Hiroki Okamura (Japan) Masayuki Onodera	(Chinese Taipei) Lee Chih-chen (Chinese Taipei) Liu Chiao-Yun	(Japan) Tadayuki Urai (Japan) Rena Miyaura
2019	(Japan) Yusuke Onodera	(Malaysia) Kisona Selvaduray	(Chinese Taipei) Chen Xin-yuan (Chinese Taipei) Lin Yu-chieh	(Chinese Taipei) Cheng Yu-chieh (Chinese Taipei) Tseng Yu-chi	(Philippines) Peter Gabriel Magnaye (Philippines) Thea Pomar
2020	Cancelled (Note: This tournament, originally to be played from 10 to 13 September, was later cancelled due to the COVID-19 pandemic in Australia.)				
2021	Cancelled (Note: This tournament, originally to be played from 21 to 26 September, was later cancelled due to the COVID-19 pandemic in Australia.)				
2022	(Chinese Taipei) Lin Chun-yi	(Chinese Taipei) Sung Shuo-yun	(Chinese Taipei) Lee Fang-chih (Chinese Taipei) Lee Fang-jen	(Chinese Taipei) Sung Shuo-yun (Chinese Taipei) Yu Chien-hui	(Chinese Taipei) Chen Xin-yuan (Chinese Taipei) Yang Ching-tun
2023	(Chinese Taipei) Ting Yen-chen	(Singapore) Jaslyn Hooi	(Chinese Taipei) Chen Cheng-kuan (Chinese Taipei) Chen Sheng-fa	(Australia) Setyana Mapasa (Australia) Angela Yu	(Chinese Taipei) Chen Sheng-fa (Chinese Taipei) Lin Jhih-yun
2024	(Chinese Taipei) Huang Ping-hsien	(Chinese Taipei) Tung Ciou-tong	(Japan) Hiroki Midorikawa (Japan) Kyohei Yamashita	(Chinese Taipei) Hsu Yin-hui (Chinese Taipei) Lin Jhih-yun	(Chinese Taipei) Chen Cheng-kuan (Chinese Taipei) Hsu Yin-hui
2025	(Chinese Taipei) Wang Yu-kai	(Chinese Taipei) Chen Su-yu	(Japan) Haruki Kawabe (Japan) Kenta Matsukawa	(Chinese Taipei) Chen Su-yu (Chinese Taipei) Hsieh Yi-en	(Chinese Taipei) Wu Guan-xun (Chinese Taipei) Lee Chia-hsin
2026	(Australia) Muhammad Rafi Zafran Ferary	(Chinese Taipei) Chen Su-yu	(Philippines) Solomon Padiz Jr. (Philippines) Julius Villabrille	(Japan) Arisa Ishida (Japan) Akari Sato	(Chinese Taipei) Lu Chen (Chinese Taipei) Chang Yun-jung

== Performances by nation ==
As of the 2026 edition

Pos	Nation	MS	WS	MD	WD	XD	Total
1	Chinese Taipei	6	5	4	6	7	28
2	Japan	3	3	3	3	1	13
3	Australia*	1		1	1	2	5
4	China		1	1	1		3
4	Indonesia	1		1		1	3
6	Malaysia		1	1			2
6	Philippines			1		1	2
6	Thailand		1		1		2
9	Singapore		1				1
9	Vietnam	1					1
Total		12	12	12	12	12	60

* Host nation
