= Badminton at the 2025 Summer World University Games – Mixed doubles =

Mixed doubles at the 2025 Summer World University Games
- Venue: Westenergie Sporthalle
- Location: Mülheim, Germany
- Dates: 22–26 July 2025
- Competitors: 128 from 32 nations

Medalists
gold medal	Wu Hsuan-yi (TPE); Yang Chu-yun (TPE)
silver medal	Chen Cheng-kuan (TPE); Hsu Yin-hui (TPE)
bronze medal	Liao Pinyi (CHN); Li Qian (CHN)
bronze medal	Lin Yu-chieh (TPE); Jheng Yu-chieh (TPE)

The mixed doubles badminton event at the 2025 Summer World University Games was held from 22 to 26 July at the Westenergie Sporthalle in Mülheim, Germany. A total of 128 competitors from 32 nations participated in the event.

== Draw ==
The draw published on 21 July 2025.

=== Finals ===
Semifinals
Chen Cheng-kuan (TPE); Hsu Yin-hui (TPE)	14	15	15
Lin Yu-chieh (TPE); Jheng Yu-chieh (TPE)	16	9	12
Liao Pinyi (CHN); Li Qian (CHN)	8	15	8
Wu Hsuan-yi (TPE); Yang Chu-yun (TPE)	15	10	15

Final
Chen Cheng-kuan (TPE); Hsu Yin-hui (TPE)	8	15
Wu Hsuan-yi (TPE); Yang Chu-yun (TPE)	15	17

=== Top half ===
==== Section 1 ====
First round
Chen C-k (TPE); Hsu Y-h (TPE)	15	15
S Cassar (MLT); F Clark (MLT)	4	7
Ł Cimosz (POL); A Khomich (POL)	15	15
K Deraj (CAN); S Wu (CAN)	8	7
J Wang (AUS); K Ea (AUS)	12	15	17
A Mohanty (IND); V Viswanath Sri (IND)	15	12	15
J Fernández (ESP); N Carulla (ESP)	15	15
G Alič (SLO); Š Alič (SLO)	12	6
Lee J-m (KOR); Kim Y-j (KOR)	15	15
A Niczyporuk (POL); J Piwowar (POL)	6	10
S Kadlec (SVK); O Kadlecová (SVK)	4	9
V Gázquez (ESP); A Torralba (ESP)	15	15
A Teerawiwat (THA); A Povanon (THA)	15	15
D Eckerlin (GER); M Wilson (GER)	8	8
R Ma (USA); V Yang (USA)	15	15
B Tóth (HUN); F Kiss (HUN)	8	12

Second round
Chen C-k (TPE); Hsu Y-h (TPE)	15	15
Ł Cimosz (POL); A Khomich (POL)	5	9
J Wang (AUS); K Ea (AUS)	8	13
J Fernández (ESP); N Carulla (ESP)	15	15
Lee J-m (KOR); Kim Y-j (KOR)	15	15
V Gázquez (ESP); A Torralba (ESP)	6	8
A Teerawiwat (THA); A Povanon (THA)	12	15	15
R Ma (USA); V Yang (USA)	15	12	11

Third round
Chen C-k (TPE); Hsu Y-h (TPE)	15	15
J Fernández (ESP); N Carulla (ESP)	7	13
Lee J-m (KOR); Kim Y-j (KOR)	11	17	15
A Teerawiwat (THA); A Povanon (THA)	15	15	11

Quarterfinals
Chen C-k (TPE); Hsu Y-h (TPE)	15	13	15
Lee J-m (KOR); Kim Y-j (KOR)	9	15	12

==== Section 2 ====
First round
M Bourakkadi (GER); L Michalski (GER)	15	15
N Yap (SGP); C Chan (SGP)	6	1
A Gabilov (AZE); H Nuriyeva (AZE)	15	7
D Franco (ESP); C Jiménez (ESP)	17	15
M Cattoen (FRA); F Vallet (FRA)	15	15
J Sim (SGP); G Tan (SGP)	7	5
Chan C L (HKG); Leung S L (HKG)	15	13	15
D Ng (SGP); S Lee (SGP)	9	15	10
Lin Y-c (TPE); Jheng Y-c (TPE)	15	16
Lau S H (HKG); S Mehta (HKG)	10	14
K Minamoto (JPN); Y Tanabe (JPN)	16	15
J Tang (CAN); S Nong (CAN)	14	7
T Budak (TUR); Y Bektaş (TUR)	9	14
S Sato (JPN); M Hirose (JPN)	15	16
M Shabanzade (AZE); N Samadova (AZE)	7	7
B Wassink (NED); A Tan (NED)	15	15

Second round
M Bourakkadi (GER); L Michalski (GER)	13	15	15
D Franco (ESP); Carmen Jiménez (ESP)	15	11	11
M Cattoen (FRA); F Vallet (FRA)	15	15
Chan C L (HKG); Leung S L (HKG)	6	12
Lin Y-c (TPE); Jheng Y-c (TPE)	15	15
K Minamoto (JPN); Y Tanabe (JPN)	10	13
S Sato (JPN); M Hirose (JPN)	13	15	15
B Wassink (NED); A Tan (NED)	15	10	8

Third round
M Bourakkadi (GER); L Michalski (GER)	15	9	15
M Cattoen (FRA); F Vallet (FRA)	13	15	12
Lin Y-c (TPE); Jheng Y-c (TPE)	15	15
S Sato (JPN); M Hirose (JPN)	10	8

Quarterfinals
M Bourakkadi (GER); L Michalski (GER)	8	9
Lin Y-c (TPE); Jheng Y-c (TPE)	15	15

=== Bottom half ===
==== Section 3 ====
First round
Kang G-h (KOR); Kim C-j (KOR)	12	15	15
Ko S H (HKG); Leung Y Y (HKG)	15	12	11
D Oliveira (BRA); A Ywata (BRA)	4	9
P Teeraratsakul (THA); C Korepap (THA)	15	15
F Onchiri (AIN); P Onyango (AIN)	6	4
T Punchihewa (SRI); S Vidanage (SRI)	15	15
A Yuan (USA); K Chou (USA)	13	11
Liao PY (CHN); Li Q (CHN)	15	15
T de Silva (SRI); J Amanda (SRI)	12	13
V Kuvale (IND); A Khan (IND)	15	15
M Tajibullayev (KAZ); D Jumadilova (KAZ)	5	6
J Dresp (GER); T P Nguyen (GER)	15	15
K Meusburger (AUT); L Rumpold (AUT)	15	15
S Rikreay (CAM); L Malynich (CAM)	11	13
Y Saigh (KSA); K Kawthar (KSA)	6	6
T Lock (CAN); C Hoang (CAN)	15	15

Second round
Kang G-h (KOR); Kim C-j (KOR)	4	10
P Teeraratsakul (THA); C Korepap (THA)	15	15
T Punchihewa (SRI); S Vidanage (SRI)	6	4
Liao PY (CHN); Li Q (CHN)	15	15
V Kuvale (IND); A Khan (IND)	15	8	9
J Dresp (GER); T P Nguyen (GER)	13	15	15
K Meusburger (AUT); L Rumpold (AUT)	14	6
T Lock (CAN); C Hoang (CAN)	16	15

Third round
P Teeraratsakul (THA); C Korepap (THA)	17	17	9
Liao PY (CHN); Li Q (CHN)	19	15	15
J Dresp (GER); T P Nguyen (GER)	15	15
T Lock (CAN); C Hoang (CAN)	7	12

Quarterfinals
Liao PY (CHN); Li Q (CHN)	15	15
J Dresp (GER); T P Nguyen (GER)	10	7

==== Section 4 ====
First round
Jin Y (KOR); Lee H-w (KOR)	15	15
O Zhao (AUS); P Kustiadi (AUS)	8	5
P Poho (ZAM); M Mukuka (ZAM)	1	3
Zhang LJ (CHN); Tang RZ (CHN)	15	15
B Kiss (HUN); H Szűcs (HUN)	5	4
Liew X (MAS); V Gobi (MAS)	15	15
B Butkus (POL); D Zimnol (POL)	5	8
S Karunakaran (IND); V Khadkekar (IND)	15	15
T Yoshida (JPN); S Nakade (JPN)	15	8	15
Wee Y H (MAS); C San (MAS)	10	15	11
B Ongeche (AIN); N Wandili (AIN)	5	6
A Lee (USA); K Ngo (USA)	15	15
D Panarin (KAZ); A Zhumabek (KAZ)	15	15
Ao F L (MAC); Wang W K (MAC)	11	7
L Kros (NED); I van Leijsen (NED)	10	16
Wu H-y (TPE); Yang C-y (TPE)	15	18

Second round
Jin Y (KOR); Lee H-w (KOR)	15	13	15
Zhang LJ (CHN); Tang RZ (CHN)	7	15	13
Liew X (MAS); V Gobi (MAS)	15	3
S Karunakaran (IND); V Khadkekar (IND)	9	1^{r}
T Yoshida (JPN); S Nakade (JPN)	15	16
A Lee (USA); K Ngo (USA)	12	14
D Panarin (KAZ); A Zhumabek (KAZ)	7	3
Wu H-y (TPE); Yang C-y (TPE)	15	15

Third round
Jin Y (KOR); Lee H-w (KOR)	15	15	15
Liew X (MAS); V Gobi (MAS)	8	17	8
T Yoshida (JPN); S Nakade (JPN)	6	18	6
Wu H-y (TPE); Yang C-y (TPE)	15	16	15

Quarterfinals
Jin Y (KOR); Lee H-w (KOR)	15	7	11
Wu H-y (TPE); Yang C-y (TPE)	10	15	15
