= 2026 Badminton Asia Team Championships – Women's team event =

Women's team at the 2026 Badminton Asia Team Championships
- Venue: Conson Gymnasium
- Location: Qingdao, China
- Dates: 3–8 February 2026
- Nations: 11

Medalists
gold medal	South Korea
silver medal	China
bronze medal	Indonesia
bronze medal	Chinese Taipei

The women's team event at the 2026 Badminton Asia Team Championships took place from 3 to 8 February at the Conson Gymnasium, Qingdao, China. India are the winner in the previous edition.

== Seeds ==
The seeds were announced on 6 January 2026 based on the BWF World Team Rankings.

1. China (final)
2. South Korea (champions)
3. Japan (quarter-finals)
4. Thailand (quarter-finals)

== Groups ==
The draw was held on 9 January 2026. The women's team group stages consist of 4 groups: W, X, Y, and Z.

Group W	Group X	Group Y	Group Z
China (1, H); Malaysia	Japan (3); Indonesia; Hong Kong	Thailand (4); India; Myanmar	South Korea (2); Chinese Taipei; Singapore

== Group stage ==
All times are China Standard Time (UTC+08:00).

=== Group W ===
Pos	Team	Pld	W	L	MF	MA	MD	GF	GA	GD	PF	PA	PD	Pts	Qualification	People's Republic of China	Malaysia
1	China (H)	1	1	0	4	1	+3	9	2	+7	224	144	+80	1	Qualified for Quarter-finals	—	4–1
2	Malaysia	1	0	1	1	4	−3	2	9	−7	144	224	−80	0	Qualified for Quarter-finals	1–4	—

Source: Badminton World Federation
Rules for classification: Tournament criteria
(H) Host

==== China vs Malaysia ====
China
4
Conson Gymnasium, Court 1
4 February 2026, 11:00

Malaysia
1

			1	2	3
1	(China) (Malaysia)	Han Qianxi; Letshanaa Karupathevan	21; 18	21; 10
2	(China) (Malaysia)	Jia Yifan / Zhang Shuxian; Ong Xin Yee / Carmen Ting	21; 10	21; 8
3	(China) (Malaysia)	Xu Wenjing; Wong Ling Ching	21; 14	21; 7
4	(China) (Malaysia)	Luo Yi / Wang Tingge; Low Zi Yu / Noraqilah Maisarah	21; 13	18; 21	17; 21
5	(China) (Malaysia)	Yuan Anqi; Oo Shan Zi	21; 11	21; 11

=== Group X ===
Pos	Team	Pld	W	L	MF	MA	MD	GF	GA	GD	PF	PA	PD	Pts	Qualification	Japan	Indonesia	Hong Kong
1	Japan	2	2	0	8	2	+6	17	4	+13	420	328	+92	2	Qualified for Quarter-finals	—	3–2	5–0
2	Indonesia	2	1	1	6	4	+2	12	10	+2	412	400	+12	1	Qualified for Quarter-finals	2–3	—	4–1
3	Hong Kong	2	0	2	1	9	−8	3	18	−15	339	443	−104	0		0–5	1–4	—

Source: Badminton World Federation
Rules for classification: Tournament criteria

==== Japan vs Hong Kong ====
Japan
5
Conson Gymnasium, Court 1
3 February 2026, 11:00

Hong Kong
0

			1	2	3
1	(Japan) (Hong Kong)	Riko Gunji; Saloni Samirbhai Mehta	21; 16	24; 22
2	(Japan) (Hong Kong)	Kie Nakanishi / Chiharu Shida; Yeung Nga Ting / Yeung Pui Lam	21; 7	21; 19
3	(Japan) (Hong Kong)	Hina Akechi; Liang Ka Wing	21; 10	21; 16
4	(Japan) (Hong Kong)	Hinata Suzuki / Nao Yamakita; Lui Lok Lok / Tsang Hiu Yan	21; 13	21; 12
5	(Japan) (Hong Kong)	Yuzuno Watanabe; Wong Yi	21; 17	21; 14

==== Indonesia vs Hong Kong ====
Indonesia
4
Conson Gymnasium, Court 2
4 February 2026, 11:00

Hong Kong
1

			1	2	3
1	(Indonesia) (Hong Kong)	Thalita Ramadhani Wiryawan; Lo Sin Yan	21; 23	19; 21
2	(Indonesia) (Hong Kong)	Febriana Dwipuji Kusuma / Meilysa Trias Puspita Sari; Yeung Nga Ting / Yeung Pui Lam	21; 16	21; 19
3	(Indonesia) (Hong Kong)	Mutiara Ayu Puspitasari; Saloni Samirbhai Mehta	21; 11	22; 20
4	(Indonesia) (Hong Kong)	Rachel Allessya Rose / Febi Setianingrum; Lui Lok Lok / Tsang Hiu Yan	21; 23	21; 18	21; 11
5	(Indonesia) (Hong Kong)	Ester Nurumi Tri Wardoyo; Wong Yi	21; 17	21; 14

==== Japan vs Indonesia ====
Japan
3
Conson Gymnasium, Court 2
5 February 2026, 11:00

Indonesia
2

			1	2	3
1	(Japan) (Indonesia)	Riko Gunji; Thalita Ramadhani Wiryawan	21; 14	21; 16
2	(Japan) (Indonesia)	Arisa Igarashi / Chiharu Shida; Rachel Allessya Rose / Febi Setianingrum	12; 21	21; 18	21; 23
3	(Japan) (Indonesia)	Hina Akechi; Mutiara Ayu Puspitasari	21; 2	21; 9
4	(Japan) (Indonesia)	Kie Nakanishi / Miyu Takahashi; Amalia Cahaya Pratiwi / Siti Fadia Silva Ramadhanti	22; 20	21; 16
5	(Japan) (Indonesia)	Yuzuno Watanabe; Ni Kadek Dhinda Amartya Pratiwi	6; 21	20; 22

=== Group Y ===
Pos	Team	Pld	W	L	MF	MA	MD	GF	GA	GD	PF	PA	PD	Pts	Qualification	Thailand	India	Myanmar
1	Thailand	2	2	0	8	2	+6	18	5	+13	455	329	+126	2	Qualified for Quarter-finals	—	3–2	5–0
2	India	2	1	1	7	3	+4	15	8	+7	449	358	+91	1	Qualified for Quarter-finals	2–3	—	5–0
3	Myanmar	2	0	2	0	10	−10	0	20	−20	203	420	−217	0		0–5	0–5	—

Source: Badminton World Federation
Rules for classification: Tournament criteria

==== Thailand vs Myanmar ====
Thailand
5
Conson Gymnasium, Court 2
3 February 2026, 11:00

Myanmar
0

			1	2	3
1	(Thailand) (Myanmar)	Busanan Ongbamrungphan; Thet Htar Thuzar	21; 10	21; 13
2	(Thailand) (Myanmar)	Pitchamon Opatniputh; Eaint Chit Phoo	21; 3	21; 6
3	(Thailand) (Myanmar)	Pornpicha Choeikeewong; Lin Lin Htet	21; 9	21; 7
4	(Thailand) (Myanmar)	Hathaithip Mijad / Napapakorn Tungkasatan; Eaint Chit Phoo / Thet Htar Thuzar	21; 5	21; 10
5	(Thailand) (Myanmar)	Phattharin Aiamvareesrisakul / Sarisa Janpeng; Lin Lin Htet / Su Latt	21; 15	21; 12

==== India vs Myanmar ====
India
5
Conson Gymnasium, Court 3
4 February 2026, 11:00

Myanmar
0

			1	2	3
1	(India) (Myanmar)	Tanvi Sharma; Thet Htar Thuzar	21; 13	21; 16
2	(India) (Myanmar)	Rakshitha Ramraj; Eaint Chit Phoo	21; 12	21; 6
3	(India) (Myanmar)	Malvika Bansod; Lin Lin Htet	21; 9	21; 12
4	(India) (Myanmar)	Priya Konjengbam / Shruti Mishra; Su Latt / Thet Htar Thuzar	21; 15	21; 16
5	(India) (Myanmar)	Treesa Jolly / Gayatri Gopichand Pullela; Lin Lin Htet / Eaint Chit Phoo	21; 8	21; 6

==== Thailand vs India ====
Thailand
3
Conson Gymnasium, Court 3
5 February 2026, 11:00

India
2

			1	2	3
1	(Thailand) (India)	Busanan Ongbamrungphan; Tanvi Sharma	14; 21	21; 17	18; 21
2	(Thailand) (India)	Tidapron Kleebyesun / Nattamon Laisuan; Treesa Jolly / Gayatri Gopichand Pullela	14; 21	22; 20	11; 21
3	(Thailand) (India)	Pitchamon Opatniputh; Rakshitha Ramraj	21; 19	21; 17
4	(Thailand) (India)	Hathaithip Mijad / Napapakorn Tungkasatan; Tanisha Crasto / Shruti Mishra	19; 21	21; 14	21; 15
5	(Thailand) (India)	Pornpicha Choeikeewong; Malvika Bansod	21; 18	21; 14

=== Group Z ===
Pos	Team	Pld	W	L	MF	MA	MD	GF	GA	GD	PF	PA	PD	Pts	Qualification	South Korea	Chinese Taipei for Olympic games	Singapore
1	South Korea	2	2	0	9	1	+8	18	5	+13	467	301	+166	2	Qualified for Quarter-finals	—	4–1	5–0
2	Chinese Taipei	2	1	1	6	4	+2	14	8	+6	383	350	+33	1	Qualified for Quarter-finals	1–4	—	5–0
3	Singapore	2	0	2	0	10	−10	1	20	−19	242	441	−199	0		0–5	0–5	—

Source: Badminton World Federation
Rules for classification: Tournament criteria

==== South Korea vs Singapore ====
South Korea
5
Conson Gymnasium, Court 3
3 February 2026, 11:00

Singapore
0

			1	2	3
1	(South Korea) (Singapore)	Kim Ga-eun; Yeo Jia Min	21; 8	21; 5
2	(South Korea) (Singapore)	Kim Hye-jeong / Kong Hee-yong; Heng Xiao En / Jin Yujia	21; 9	21; 11
3	(South Korea) (Singapore)	Park Ga-eun; Insyirah Khan	22; 20	21; 10
4	(South Korea) (Singapore)	Lee Seo-jin / Lee Yeon-woo; Li Zheng Hong / Li Zheng Yan	21; 4	21; 8
5	(South Korea) (Singapore)	Kim Min-ji; Megan Lee	17; 21	24; 22	21; 10

==== Chinese Taipei vs Singapore ====
Chinese Taipei
5
Conson Gymnasium, Court 4
4 February 2026, 11:00

Singapore
0

			1	2	3
1	(Chinese Taipei) (Singapore)	Chiu Pin-chian; Insyirah Khan	21; 12	21; 12
2	(Chinese Taipei) (Singapore)	Hsu Yin-hui / Lin Jhih-yun; Heng Xiao En / Jin Yujia	21; 13	21; 14
3	(Chinese Taipei) (Singapore)	Lin Hsiang-ti; Megan Lee	21; 11	21; 10
4	(Chinese Taipei) (Singapore)	Chang Ching-hui / Yang Ching-tun; Li Zheng Yan / Andrea Jacqui Tay	21; 12	21; 9
5	(Chinese Taipei) (Singapore)	Hsu Wen-chi; Jaslynn Hooi	21; 15	21; 6

==== South Korea vs Chinese Taipei ====
South Korea
4
Conson Gymnasium, Court 1
5 February 2026, 11:00

Chinese Taipei
1

			1	2	3
1	(South Korea) (Chinese Taipei)	An Se-young; Chiu Pin-chian	21; 10	21; 13
2	(South Korea) (Chinese Taipei)	Baek Ha-na / Kim Hye-jeong; Hsu Yin-hui / Lin Jhih-yun	21; 6	21; 6
3	(South Korea) (Chinese Taipei)	Kim Ga-eun; Lin Hsiang-ti	13; 21	21; 14	21; 14
4	(South Korea) (Chinese Taipei)	Lee Seo-jin / Lee Yeon-woo; Hsu Ya-ching / Sung Yu-hsuan	19; 21	19; 21
5	(South Korea) (Chinese Taipei)	Park Ga-eun; Sung Shuo-yun	21; 18	17; 21	21; 8

== Knockouts ==
All times are China Standard Time (UTC+08:00).

=== Bracket ===
Quarter-finals
6 February, 10:00
China (1)	3
India	0
6 February, 10:00
Japan (3)	2
Chinese Taipei	3
6 February, 10:00
Indonesia	3
Thailand (4)	2
6 February, 10:00
Malaysia	0
South Korea (2)	3

Semi-finals
7 February, 10:00
China (1)	3
Chinese Taipei	0
7 February, 10:00
Indonesia	1
South Korea (2)	3

Final
8 February, 09:30
China (1)	0
South Korea (2)	3

=== Quarter-finals ===
==== China vs India ====
China
3
Conson Gymnasium, Court 1
6 February 2026, 10:00

India
0

			1	2	3
1	(China) (India)	Gao Fangjie; Tanvi Sharma	21; 9	21; 9
2	(China) (India)	Jia Yifan / Zhang Shuxian; Treesa Jolly / Gayatri Gopichand Pullela	24; 22	21; 18
3	(China) (India)	Xu Wenjing; Rakshitha Ramraj	14; 21	21; 15	21; 17
4	(China) (India)	Chen Fanshutian / Liu Jiayue; Tanisha Crasto / Shruti Mishra				not played
5	(China) (India)	Yuan Anqi; Surya Tamiri				not played

==== Japan vs Chinese Taipei ====
Japan
2
Conson Gymnasium, Court 4
6 February 2026, 10:00

Chinese Taipei
3

			1	2	3
1	(Japan) (Chinese Taipei)	Riko Gunji; Chiu Pin-chian	21; 13	21; 16
2	(Japan) (Chinese Taipei)	Kie Nakanishi / Miyu Takahashi; Hsu Ya-ching / Sung Yu-hsuan	21; 15	21; 17
3	(Japan) (Chinese Taipei)	Hina Akechi; Lin Hsiang-ti	21; 17	19; 21	15; 21
4	(Japan) (Chinese Taipei)	Hinata Suzuki / Nao Yamakita; Hsu Yin-hui / Yang Ching-tun	20; 22	21; 12	13; 21
5	(Japan) (Chinese Taipei)	Yuzuno Watanabe; Hsu Wen-chi	18; 21	21; 8	15; 21

==== Indonesia vs Thailand ====
Indonesia
3
Conson Gymnasium, Court 3
6 February 2026, 10:00

Thailand
2

			1	2	3
1	(Indonesia) (Thailand)	Thalita Ramadhani Wiryawan; Busanan Ongbamrungphan	22; 24	18; 21
2	(Indonesia) (Thailand)	Febriana Dwipuji Kusuma / Meilysa Trias Puspita Sari; Tidapron Kleebyesun / Nattamon Laisuan	21; 14	21; 18
3	(Indonesia) (Thailand)	Ni Kadek Dhinda Amartya Pratiwi; Pitchamon Opatniputh	21; 19	17; 21	13; 21
4	(Indonesia) (Thailand)	Amallia Cahaya Pratiwi / Siti Fadia Silva Ramadhanti; Hathaithip Mijad / Napapakorn Tungkasatan	21; 13	21; 9
5	(Indonesia) (Thailand)	Ester Nurumi Tri Wardoyo; Pornpicha Choeikeewong	21; 13	21; 16

==== Malaysia vs South Korea ====
Malaysia
0
Conson Gymnasium, Court 2
6 February 2026, 10:00

South Korea
3

			1	2	3
1	(Malaysia) (South Korea)	Letshanaa Karupathevan; An Se-young	11; 21	11; 21
2	(Malaysia) (South Korea)	Ong Xin Yee / Carmen Ting; Baek Ha-na / Kim Hye-jeong	13; 21	9; 21
3	(Malaysia) (South Korea)	Wong Ling Ching; Park Ga-eun	16; 21	12; 21
4	(Malaysia) (South Korea)	Low Zi Yu / Noraqilah Maisarah; Kong Hee-yong / Lee Yeon-woo				not played
5	(Malaysia) (South Korea)	Siti Zulaikha; Kim Min-ji				not played

==== China vs Chinese Taipei ====
China
3
Conson Gymnasium, Court 1
7 February 2026, 10:00

Chinese Taipei
0

			1	2	3
1	(China) (Chinese Taipei)	Gao Fangjie; Chiu Pin-chian	18; 21	21; 17	21; 16
2	(China) (Chinese Taipei)	Jia Yifan / Zhang Shuxian; Hsu Ya-ching / Sung Yu-hsuan	21; 11	21; 7
3	(China) (Chinese Taipei)	Xu Wenjing; Lin Hsiang-ti	16; 21	21; 10	21; 13
4	(China) (Chinese Taipei)	Chen Fanshutian / Liu Jiayue; Hsu Yin-hui / Yang Ching-tun				not played
5	(China) (Chinese Taipei)	Yuan Anqi; Sung Shuo-yun				not played

==== Indonesia vs South Korea ====
Indonesia
1
Conson Gymnasium, Court 2
7 February 2026, 10:00

South Korea
3

			1	2	3
1	(Indonesia) (South Korea)	Thalita Ramadhani Wiryawan; Kim Ga-eun	5; 21	4; 21
2	(Indonesia) (South Korea)	Rachel Allessya Rose / Febi Setianingrum; Baek Ha-na / Kim Hye-jeong	14; 21	10; 21
3	(Indonesia) (South Korea)	Ni Kadek Dhinda Amartya Pratiwi; Park Ga-eun	21; 14	21; 13
4	(Indonesia) (South Korea)	Amallia Cahaya Pratiwi / Siti Fadia Silva Ramadhanti; Lee Seo-jin / Lee Yeon-woo	19; 21	19; 21
5	(Indonesia) (South Korea)	Ester Nurumi Tri Wardoyo; Kim Min-ji				not played

==== China vs South Korea ====
China
0
Conson Gymnasium, Court 1
8 February 2026, 09:30

South Korea
3

			1	2	3
1	(China) (South Korea)	Han Qianxi; An Se-young	7; 21	14; 21
2	(China) (South Korea)	Jia Yifan / Zhang Shuxian; Baek Ha-na / Kim Hye-jeong	22; 24	8; 21
3	(China) (South Korea)	Xu Wenjing; Kim Ga-eun	21; 19	10; 21	17; 21
4	(China) (South Korea)	Chen Fanshutian / Liu Jiayue; Lee Seo-jin / Lee Yeon-woo				not played
5	(China) (South Korea)	Yuan Anqi; Kim Min-ji				not played

== Final ranking ==
Pos	Team	Pld	W	L	Pts	MD	GD	PD	Final result
1st place, gold medalist(s)	South Korea	5	5	0	5	+16	+28	+248	Champions
2nd place, silver medalist(s)	China	4	3	1	3	+6	+11	+107	Runners-up
3rd place, bronze medalist(s)	Indonesia	4	2	2	2	+1	+1	0	Eliminated in semi-finals
3rd place, bronze medalist(s)	Chinese Taipei	4	2	2	2	0	+1	−33	Eliminated in semi-finals
5	Japan	3	2	1	2	+5	+14	+114	Eliminated in quarter-finals
6	Thailand	3	2	1	2	+5	+10	+98	Eliminated in quarter-finals
7	India	3	1	2	1	−1	+2	+59	Eliminated in quarter-finals
8	Malaysia	2	0	2	0	−6	−13	−134	Eliminated in quarter-finals
9	Hong Kong	2	0	2	0	−8	−15	−104	Eliminated in group stage
10	Singapore	2	0	2	0	−10	−19	−199	Eliminated in group stage
11	Myanmar	2	0	2	0	−10	−20	−217	Eliminated in group stage
