= Lin Jhih-yun =

Taiwanese badminton player

Lin Jhih-yun 林芝昀
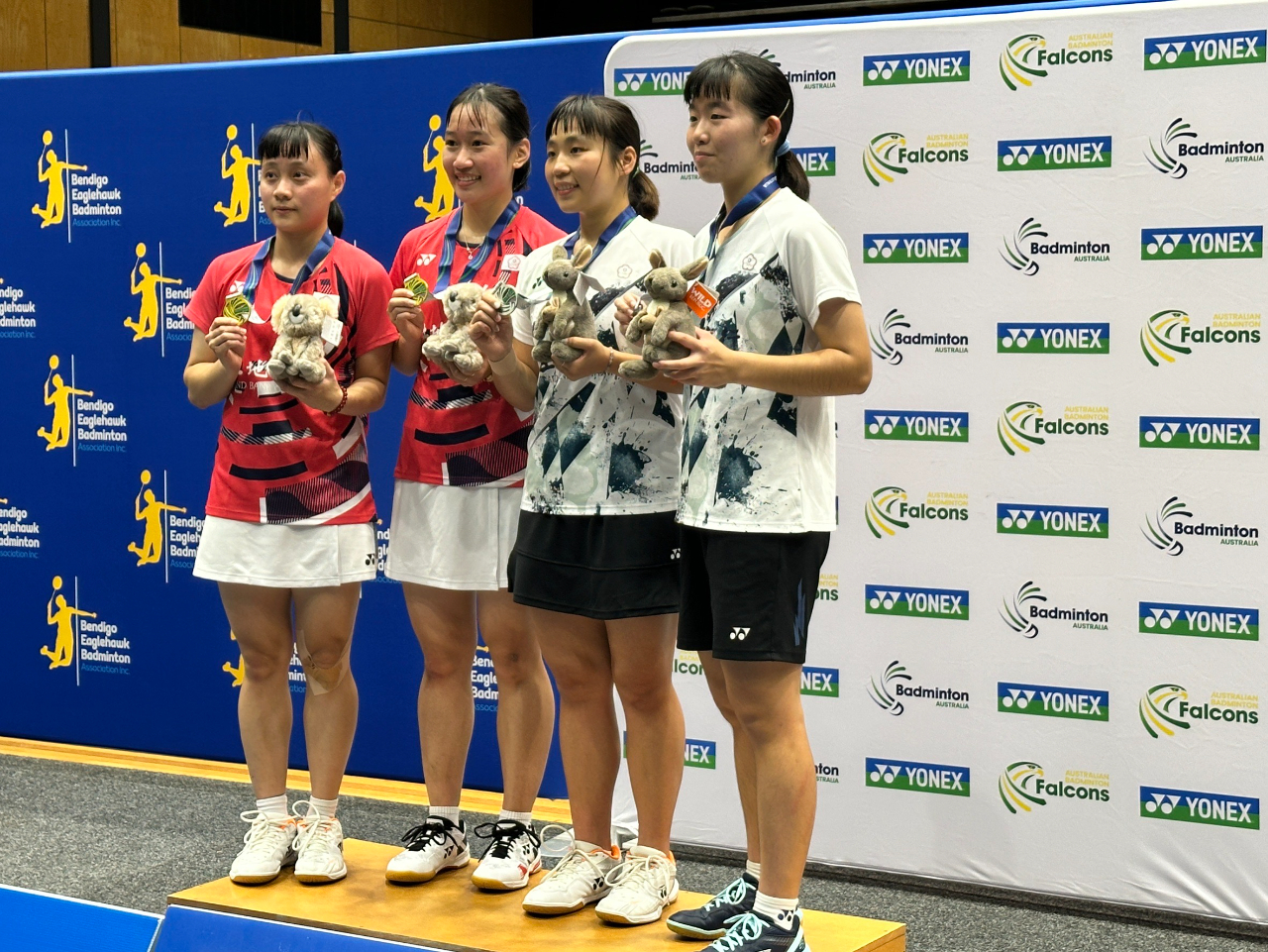
- Lin Jhih-yun (far left) on the podium at the 2024 Bendigo International

Personal information
- Born: 13 September 1999 (age 27) Taiwan
- Height: 1.6 m (5 ft 3 in)

Sport
- Country: Republic of China (Taiwan)
- Sport: Badminton
- Handedness: Right

Women's singles & doubles
- Highest ranking: 6 (WD with Hsu Yin-hui, 20 October 2026); 76 (XD with Chen Sheng-fa, 26 March 2024); 186 (WS, 10 March 2020)
- Current ranking: 6 (WD with Hsu Yin-hui); 216 (XD with Lin Bing-wei) (17 November 2026)
- BWF profile
Medal record
Women's badminton
Representing Chinese Taipei
Asia Team Championships
Bronze medal – third place	2026 Qingdao	Women's team

Lin Jhih-yun (born 13 September 1999) is a Taiwanese badminton player.

== Career ==
In 2026, Hsu won a bronze medal at the Badminton Asia Team Championships in the women's team event.

== Achievements ==
=== BWF World Tour (4 runners-up) ===
The BWF World Tour, which was announced on 19 March 2017 and implemented in 2018, is a series of elite badminton tournaments sanctioned by the Badminton World Federation (BWF). The BWF World Tour is divided into levels of World Tour Finals, Super 1000, Super 750, Super 500, Super 300, and the BWF Tour Super 100.

Women's doubles

Year	Tournament	Level	Partner	Opponent	Score	Result	Ref
2024	Canada Open	Super 500	(Chinese Taipei) Hsu Yin-hui	(Japan) Rin Iwanaga (Japan) Kie Nakanishi	13–21, 13–21	(silver) Runner-up	
2025	Hylo Open	Super 500	(Chinese Taipei) Hsu Yin-hui	(France) Margot Lambert (France) Camille Pognante	16–21, 10–21	(silver) Runner-up	
2026	Arctic Open	Super 500	(Chinese Taipei) Hsu Yin-hui	(China) Chen Fanshutian (China) Luo Xumin	18–21, 19–21	(silver) Runner-up	
2026	Hylo Open	Super 500	(Chinese Taipei) Hsu Yin-hui	(Indonesia) Amallia Cahaya Pratiwi (Indonesia) Siti Fadia Silva Ramadhanti	18–21, 19–21	(silver) Runner-up	

=== BWF International Challenge/Series (8 titles, 2 runners-up) ===
Women's singles
Year	Tournament	Opponent	Score	Result	Ref.
2019	Perth International	(Chinese Taipei) Liang Ting-yu	15–21, 21–17, 14–21	(silver) Runner-up	
2020	Slovak Open	(Chinese Taipei) Huang Yu-hsun	21–19, 21–4	(gold) Winner	

Women's doubles
Year	Tournament	Partner	Opponent	Score	Result	Ref.
2017	Sydney International	(Chinese Taipei) Hung En-tzu	(Australia) Wendy Chen (Australia) Sylvina Kurniawan	21–19, 21–19	(gold) Winner	
2020	Slovak Open	(Chinese Taipei) Lee Chia-hsin	(Chinese Taipei) Hsieh Pei-shan (Chinese Taipei) Wu Ti-jung	21–18, 21–18	(gold) Winner	
2023	Bendigo International	(Chinese Taipei) Hsu Yin-hui	(Australia) Setyana Mapasa (Australia) Angela Yu	21–18, 20–22, 25–27	(silver) Runner-up	
2024	Polish Open	(Chinese Taipei) Hsu Yin-hui	(Denmark) Amalie Cecilie Kudsk (Denmark) Signe Schulz	21–15, 21–16	(gold) Winner	
2024	Bendigo International	(Chinese Taipei) Hsu Yin-hui	(Chinese Taipei) Lee Chih-chen (Chinese Taipei) Lin Yen-yu	21–15, 21–16	(gold) Winner	
2024	Sydney International	(Chinese Taipei) Hsu Yin-hui	(Chinese Taipei) Lee Chih-chen (Chinese Taipei) Lin Yen-yu	21–12, 21–12	(gold) Winner	

Mixed doubles
Year	Tournament	Partner	Opponent	Score	Result	Ref.
2023	Bendigo International	(Chinese Taipei) Chen Sheng-fa	(Australia) Kenneth Choo (Australia) Gronya Somerville	12–21, 21–14, 21–11	(gold) Winner	
2023	Sydney International	(Chinese Taipei) Chen Sheng-fa	(Australia) Kenneth Choo (Australia) Gronya Somerville	21–18, 21–11	(gold) Winner	

BWF International Challenge tournament
BWF International Series tournament
BWF Future Series tournament
