= Hsu Yin-hui =

Taiwanese badminton player

Hsu Yin-hui 許尹鏸
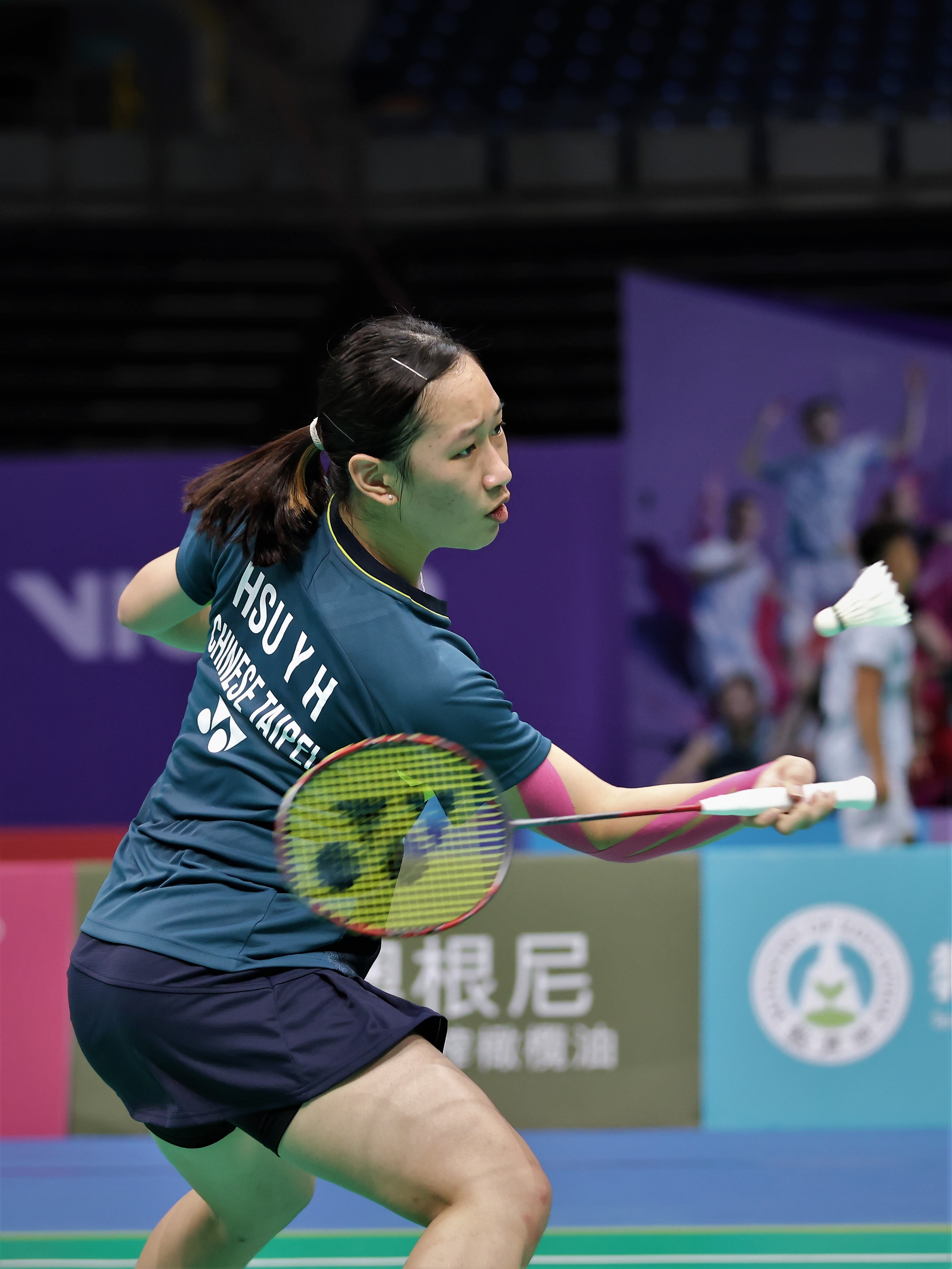
- Hsu Yin-hui at the 2024 Kaohsiung Masters

Personal information
- Born: 18 March 2003 (age 23) Taiwan
- Height: 1.67 m (5 ft 6 in)

Sport
- Country: Republic of China (Taiwan)
- Sport: Badminton
- Handedness: Right

Women's & mixed doubles
- Highest ranking: 6 (WD with Lin Jhih-yun, 20 October 2026); 18 (XD with Liu Kuang-heng, 27 October 2026); 19 (XD with Chen Cheng-kuan, 14 April 2026)
- Current ranking: 6 (WD with Lin Jhih-yun); 21 (XD with Liu Kuang-heng) (17 November 2026)
- BWF profile
Medal record
Women's badminton
Representing Chinese Taipei
Asia Team Championships
Bronze medal – third place	2026 Qingdao	Women's team
World University Games
Silver medal – second place	2025 Rhine-Ruhr	Mixed team
Silver medal – second place	2025 Rhine-Ruhr	Mixed doubles

Hsu Yin-hui (born 18 March 2003) is a Taiwanese badminton player.

== Career ==
In 2025, Hsu participated in the World University Games, where she won a silver medal in the mixed team event. She also won another silver medal in the mixed doubles event, partnering with Chen Cheng-kuan.

In 2026, Hsu won a bronze medal at the Badminton Asia Team Championships in the women's team event.

== Achievements ==
=== World University Games ===
Mixed doubles
Year	Venue	Partner	Opponent	Score	Result	Ref.
2025	Westenergie Sporthalle; Mülheim, Germany	(Chinese Taipei) Chen Cheng-kuan	(Chinese Taipei) Wu Hsuan-yi (Chinese Taipei) Yang Chu-yun	8–15, 15–17	Silver	

=== BWF World Tour (1 title, 5 runners-up) ===
The BWF World Tour, which was announced on 19 March 2017 and implemented in 2018, is a series of elite badminton tournaments sanctioned by the Badminton World Federation (BWF). The BWF World Tour is divided into levels of World Tour Finals, Super 1000, Super 750, Super 500, Super 300, and the BWF Tour Super 100.

Women's doubles

Year	Tournament	Level	Partner	Opponent	Score	Result	Ref
2024	Canada Open	Super 500	(Chinese Taipei) Lin Jhih-yun	(Japan) Rin Iwanaga (Japan) Kie Nakanishi	13–21, 13–21	(silver) Runner-up	
2025	Hylo Open	Super 500	(Chinese Taipei) Lin Jhih-yun	(France) Margot Lambert (France) Camille Pognante	16–21, 10–21	(silver) Runner-up	
2026	Arctic Open	Super 500	(Chinese Taipei) Lin Jhih-yun	(China) Chen Fanshutian (China) Luo Xumin	18–21, 19–21	(silver) Runner-up	
2026	Hylo Open	Super 500	(Chinese Taipei) Lin Jhih-yun	(Indonesia) Amallia Cahaya Pratiwi (Indonesia) Siti Fadia Silva Ramadhanti	18–21, 19–21	(silver) Runner-up	

Mixed doubles

Year	Tournament	Level	Partner	Opponent	Score	Result	Ref
2026	U.S. Open	Super 300	(Chinese Taipei) Liu Kuang-heng	(Chinese Taipei) Wu Hsuan-yi (Chinese Taipei) Yang Chu-yun	21–9, 21–11	(gold) Winner	
2026	Canada Open	Super 300	(Chinese Taipei) Liu Kuang-heng	(Japan) Akira Koga (Japan) Natsu Saito	17–21, 21–17, 17–21	(silver) Runner-up	

=== BWF International Challenge/Series (5 titles, 4 runners-up) ===
Women's doubles
Year	Tournament	Partner	Opponent	Score	Result	Ref.
2023	Dutch International	(Chinese Taipei) Lee Chih-chen	(Japan) Hina Osawa (Japan) Miku Shigeta	21–14, 21–17	(gold) Winner	
2023	Slovenia Open	(Chinese Taipei) Lee Chih-chen	(Chinese Taipei) Liu Chiao-yun (Chinese Taipei) Wang Yu-qiao	20–22, 18–21	(silver) Runner-up	
2023	Austrian International	(Chinese Taipei) Lee Chih-chen	(Chinese Taipei) Liu Chiao-yun (Chinese Taipei) Wang Yu-qiao	15–21, 17–21	(silver) Runner-up	
2023	Bendigo International	(Chinese Taipei) Lin Jhih-yun	(Australia) Setyana Mapasa (Australia) Angela Yu	21–18, 20–22, 25–27	(silver) Runner-up	
2024	Polish Open	(Chinese Taipei) Lin Jhih-yun	(Denmark) Amalie Cecilie Kudsk (Denmark) Signe Schulz	21–15, 21–16	(gold) Winner	
2024	Bendigo International	(Chinese Taipei) Lin Jhih-yun	(Chinese Taipei) Lee Chih-chen (Chinese Taipei) Lin Yen-yu	21–15, 21–16	(gold) Winner	
2024	Sydney International	(Chinese Taipei) Lin Jhih-yun	(Chinese Taipei) Lee Chih-chen (Chinese Taipei) Lin Yen-yu	21–12, 21–12	(gold) Winner	

Mixed doubles
Year	Tournament	Partner	Opponent	Score	Result	Ref.
2023	Malaysia International	(Chinese Taipei) Lin Yu-chieh	(Malaysia) Hoo Pang Ron (Malaysia) Cheng Su Yin	17–21, 19–21	(silver) Runner-up	
2024	Sydney International	(Chinese Taipei) Chen Cheng-kuan	(Australia) Andika Ramadiansyah (Australia) Nozomi Shimizu	26–24, 11–21, 21–11	(gold) Winner	

BWF International Challenge tournament
BWF International Series tournament
BWF Future Series tournament
