= Bendigo International (badminton) =

The Bendigo International is an international badminton tournament to be held for the first time in Bendigo, Victoria, Australia, in September 2020. The event is part of the Badminton World Federation's International Series and part of the Badminton Oceania circuit.

== Past winners ==
Year	Men's singles	Women's singles	Men's doubles	Women's doubles	Mixed doubles	Ref
2020	Cancelled (Note: This tournament, originally to be played from 17 to 20 September, was later cancelled due to the COVID-19 pandemic in Australia.)					
2021	Cancelled (Note: This tournament, originally to be played from 14 to 19 September, was later cancelled due to the COVID-19 pandemic in Australia.)					
2022	(Chinese Taipei) Lin Chun-yi	(Chinese Taipei) Sung Shuo-yun	(Chinese Taipei) Chang Ko-chi (Chinese Taipei) Po Li-wei	(Chinese Taipei) Lee Chia-hsin (Chinese Taipei) Teng Chun-hsun	(Chinese Taipei) Chang Ko-chi (Chinese Taipei) Lee Chih-chen	
2023	(Japan) Keita Makino	(Singapore) Jaslyn Hooi	(Chinese Taipei) Chen Cheng-kuan (Chinese Taipei) Chen Sheng-fa	(Australia) Setyana Mapasa (Australia) Angela Yu	(Chinese Taipei) Chen Sheng-fa (Chinese Taipei) Lin Jhih-yun	
2024	(Japan) Shogo Ogawa	(India) Tanya Hemanth	(Chinese Taipei) Chen Cheng-kuan (Chinese Taipei) Po Li-wei	(Chinese Taipei) Hsu Yin-hui (Chinese Taipei) Lin Jhih-yun	(Singapore) Wesley Koh (Singapore) Jin Yujia	
2025	(Japan) Toma Noda	(Japan) Nodoka Sunakawa	(Chinese Taipei) Chen Zhi-ray (Chinese Taipei) Lin Yu-chieh	(Chinese Taipei) Sung Yi-hsuan (Chinese Taipei) Tsai Hsin-pei	(Chinese Taipei) Wu Guan-xun (Chinese Taipei) Lee Chia-hsin	
2026	(Chinese Taipei) Liao Jhuo-fu	(Chinese Taipei) Liao Jui-chi	(Chinese Taipei) Chiu Shao-hua (Chinese Taipei) Lin Bing-wei	(Chinese Taipei) Liao Jui-chi (Chinese Taipei) Lin Yen-yu	(Australia) Andika Ramadiansyah (Australia) Nozomi Shimizu	

== Performances by nation ==
As of 2026 edition

Pos.	Nation	MS	WS	MD	WD	XD	Total
1	Chinese Taipei	2	2	5	4	3	16
2	Japan	3	1				4
3	Australia*				1	1	2
3	Singapore		1			1	2
5	India		1				1
Total		5	5	5	5	5	25

* Host nation
