= Lin Chun-yi (badminton) =

Taiwanese badminton player

Lin Chun-yi 林俊易
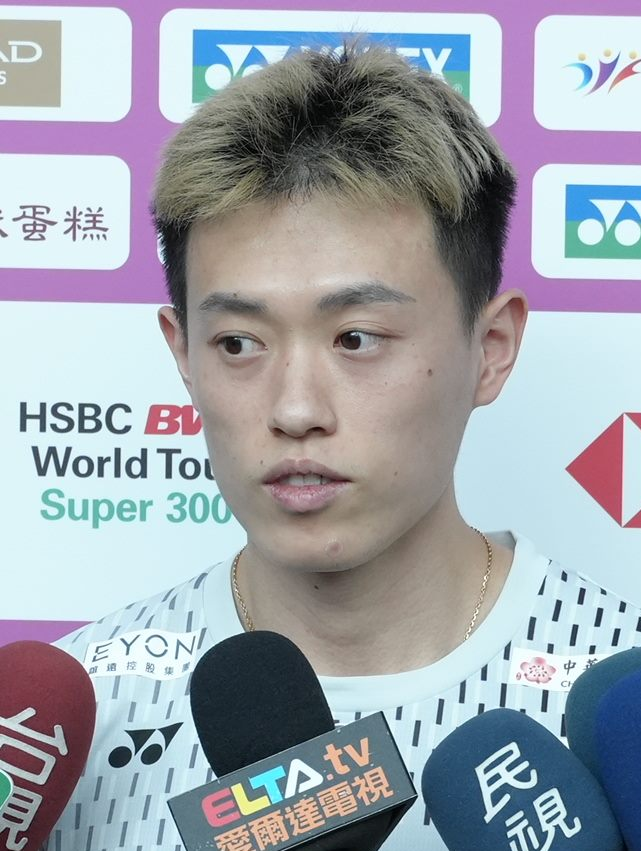
- Lin at the 2026 Taipei Open

Personal information
- Born: 2 October 1999 (age 27) Fangliao, Pingtung County, Taiwan
- Height: 1.81 m (5 ft 11 in)

Sport
- Country: Republic of China (Taiwan)
- Sport: Badminton
- Handedness: Left

Men's singles
- Highest ranking: 8 (10 March 2026)
- Current ranking: 14 (3 November 2026)
- BWF profile
Medal record
Men's badminton
Representing Chinese Taipei
Thomas Cup
Bronze medal – third place	2024 Chengdu	Men's team
World University Games
Gold medal – first place	2021 Chengdu	Mixed team

Lin Chun-yi (Chinese: 林俊易; pinyin: Lín Jùnyì; born 2 October 1999) is a Taiwanese badminton player. He is the champion of the 2026 All England Open.

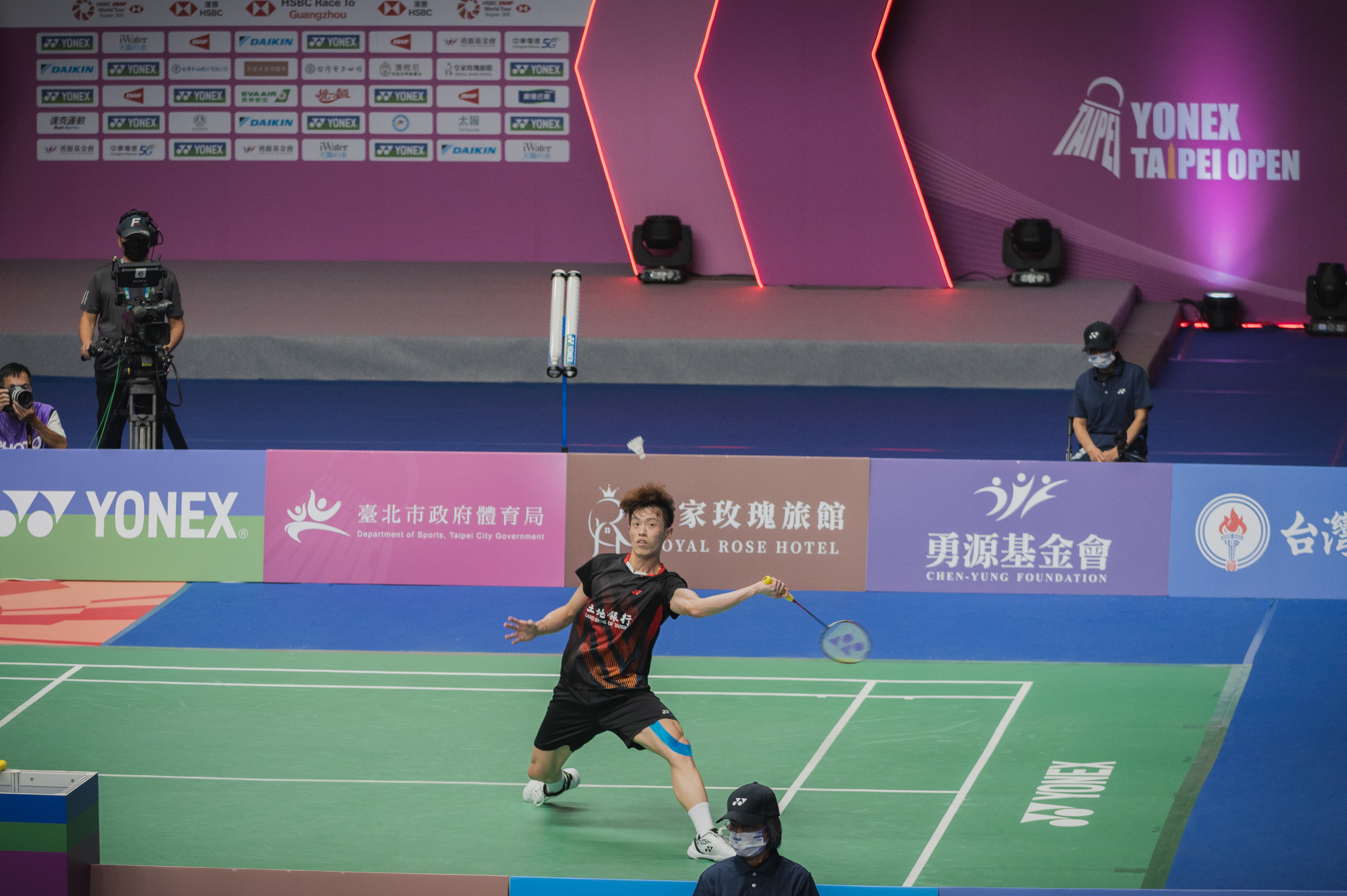
Lin at the 2022 Taipei Open

== Career ==
=== 2017–2020: First World Tour title ===
In September 2017, Lin participated in the Sydney International tournament and defeated his teammate Chen Shiau-cheng in the men's singles final, winning his first international title. In April 2019, he finished runner-up at the Finnish Open; in July, at the age of 19, Lin participated in the Super 300 U.S. Open, advancing from the qualifying rounds to the men's singles final, and defeated Tanongsak Saensomboonsuk in straight games, winning his first World Tour title.

In 2020, Lin transferred from Chung Leasing to Land Bank. Subsequently, due to a knee injury and the pressure of the U.S. Open title, his performance in domestic competitions fluctuated. Due to the impact of the severe COVID-19 pandemic, Lin was unable to participate in international competitions, and his world ranking remained at 69th.

=== 2021–2023: Thailand and Kaohsiung Masters title ===
In January 2021, Lin defeated Liao Jhuo-fu in the 110th National Ranking Tournament, winning his first group A ranking tournament title. In July 2022, Lin played in the Taipei Open on his home turf, and surprisingly defeated the second seed Wang Tzu-wei in the quarter-finals. In the semi-finals, he narrowly lost to the rising Japanese star Kodai Naraoka. In the second half of 2022, Lin competed in various BWF International Challenge/Series tournaments to gain points and improve his ranking. He won the Mongolia, Belgian, Sydney, Bendigo, and the Norwegian Internationals; while in the Hungarian International and Irish Open, he finished runners-up, quickly raising his ranking from 97th to 38th.

In February 2023, Lin reached the final of Thailand Masters by defeating the former World No. 2 men's singles Chinese player, Shi Yuqi in the semi-finals. In the final, he defeated the 4th seed Ng Ka Long to win his second BWF World Tour title. In October, he won the Kaohsiung Masters.

=== 2024–2025: Swiss and Taipei Open title ===
In 2024, Lin reached his first ever BWF Super 1000 semi-finals in the Malaysia Open. He defeated seeded players Vitidsarn and Li Shifeng en route to the semi-finals, before losing to Anders Antonsen. Lin then captured two BWF World Tour titles in the Swiss and Taipei Opens. In 2025, he achieved second place in the Orléans and China Masters.

=== 2026: All England title ===
In early 2026, Lin suffered a calf strain during his first-round match against Chou Tien-chen at the Malaysia Open. His injury was so severe that he was unable to walk for a time and considered withdrawing from the India Open a week later. However, after recovering well, he chose to continue competing. At the India Open, Lin defeated Lakshya Sen and Victor Lai in three-game matches over two consecutive days to advance to the final. In the final, he faced the third seed, Jonatan Christie, and defeated him 21–10, 21–18 to win the title, securing his first Super 750 title. He also became the first Taiwanese male singles player to win a title at this level on the BWF World Tour. In March, less than two months after winning the India Open, Lin defeated Wang Tzu-wei, the No. 4 seed Christie, the No. 5 seed Christo Popov, and the No. 2 seed Kunlavut Vitidsarn in succession to reach the final of the All England Open. In the final, he faced Lakshya Sen, ranked No. 12 in the world, and won in straight games, becoming the first Taiwanese to win the All England Open men's singles title.

== Achievements ==
=== BWF World Tour (7 titles, 2 runner-up) ===
The BWF World Tour, which was announced on 19 March 2017 and implemented in 2018, is a series of elite badminton tournaments sanctioned by the Badminton World Federation (BWF). The BWF World Tour is divided into levels of World Tour Finals, Super 1000, Super 750, Super 500, Super 300, and the BWF Tour Super 100.

Men's singles
Year	Tournament	Level	Opponent	Score	Result	Ref.
2019	U.S. Open	Super 300	(Thailand) Tanongsak Saensomboonsuk	21–10, 21–13	(gold) Winner	
2023	Thailand Masters	Super 300	(Hong Kong) Ng Ka Long	21–17, 21–14	(gold) Winner	
2023	Kaohsiung Masters	Super 100	(Japan) Yushi Tanaka	11–21, 21–17, 21–14	(gold) Winner	
2024	Swiss Open	Super 300	(Chinese Taipei) Chou Tien-chen	7–21, 22–20, 23–21	(gold) Winner	
2024	Taipei Open	Super 300	(Chinese Taipei) Chi Yu-jen	21–17, 21–13	(gold) Winner	
2025	Orléans Masters	Super 300	(France) Alex Lanier	13–21, 18–21	(silver) Runner-up	
2025	China Masters	Super 750	(China) Weng Hongyang	11–21, 15–21	(silver) Runner-up	
2026	India Open	Super 750	(Indonesia) Jonatan Christie	21–10, 21–18	(gold) Winner	
2026	All England Open	Super 1000	(India) Lakshya Sen	21–15, 22–20	(gold) Winner	

=== BWF International Challenge/Series (6 titles, 3 runners-up) ===
Men's singles
Year	Tournament	Opponent	Score	Result	Ref.
2017	Sydney International	(Chinese Taipei) Chen Shiau-cheng	21–18, 21–17	(gold) Winner	
2019	Finnish Open	(Thailand) Kunlavut Vitidsarn	16–21, 21–18, 14–21	(silver) Runner-up	
2022	Mongolia International	(Chinese Taipei) Su Li-yang	21–16, 21–14	(gold) Winner	
2022	Belgian International	(Denmark) Kim Bruun	21–14, 21–13	(gold) Winner	
2022	Sydney International	(Singapore) Joel Koh	21–11, 12–21, 21–10	(gold) Winner	
2022	Bendigo International	(Chinese Taipei) Su Li-yang	21–19, 22–20	(gold) Winner	
2022	Hungarian International	(Chinese Taipei) Lee Chia-hao	9–21, 14–21	(silver) Runner-up	
2022	Norwegian International	(Chinese Taipei) Lee Chia-hao	21–12, 21–11	(gold) Winner	
2022	Irish Open	(Denmark) Magnus Johannesen	14–21, 17–21	(silver) Runner-up	

BWF International Challenge tournament
BWF International Series tournament
