= Chen Cheng-kuan =

Taiwanese badminton player (born 2003)

Chen Cheng-kuan 陳政寬
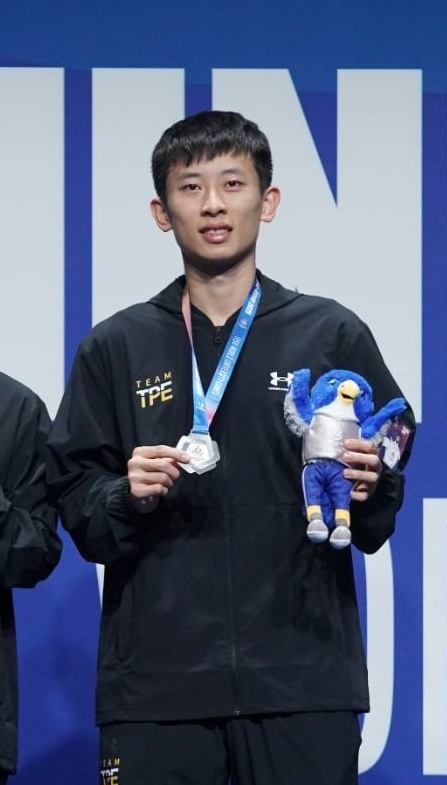

Personal information
- Born: 15 October 2003 (age 23)

Sport
- Country: Republic of China (Taiwan)
- Sport: Badminton
- Handedness: Right

Men's & mixed doubles
- Highest ranking: 40 (MD with Liu Kuan-heng, 3 November 2026); 49 (MD with Chen Sheng-fa, 10 September 2024); 19 (XD with Hsu Yin-hui, 18 March 2025)
- Current ranking: 40 (MD with Liu Kuan-heng); 37 (XD with Hsu Yin-hui) (3 November 2026)
- BWF profile
Medal record
Men's badminton
Representing Chinese Taipei
World University Games
Silver medal – second place	2025 Rhine-Ruhr	Mixed team
Silver medal – second place	2025 Rhine-Ruhr	Mixed doubles

Chen Cheng-kuan (Chinese: 陳政寬; pinyin: Chén Zhèngkuān; born 15 October 2003) is a Taiwanese badminton player. In 2023, Chen won his first title at a Super 100 level tournament in Malaysia and also won a silver in the mixed doubles at the world university games held in Mülheim with his partner Hsu Yin-hui in 2025.

== Achievements ==
=== World University Games ===
Mixed doubles
Year	Venue	Partner	Opponent	Score	Result
2025	Westenergie Sporthalle; Mülheim, Germany	(Chinese Taipei) Hsu Yin-hui	(Chinese Taipei) Wu Hsuan-yi (Chinese Taipei) Yang Chu-yun	8–15, 15–17	Silver

=== BWF World Tour (1 title) ===
The BWF World Tour, which was announced on 19 March 2017 and implemented in 2018, is a series of elite badminton tournaments sanctioned by the Badminton World Federation (BWF). The BWF World Tours are divided into levels of World Tour Finals, Super 1000, Super 750, Super 500, Super 300, and the BWF Tour Super 100.

Men's doubles
Year	Tournament	Level	Partner	Opponent	Score	Result
2023	Malaysia Super 100	Super 100	(Chinese Taipei) Chen Sheng-fa	(Malaysia) Low Hang Yee (Malaysia) Ng Eng Cheong	23–21, 21–17	(gold) Winner

=== BWF International Challenge/Series (6 titles, 1 runners-up) ===
Men's doubles
Year	Tournament	Partner	Opponent	Score	Result
2023	Sydney International	(Chinese Taipei) Chen Sheng-fa	(Chinese Taipei) Chan Yueh-lin (Chinese Taipei) Chu Bo-rong	21–16, 21–14	(gold) Winner
2023	Bendigo International	(Chinese Taipei) Chen Sheng-fa	(Chinese Taipei) Chan Yueh-lin (Chinese Taipei) Chu Bo-rong	Walkover	(gold) Winner
2024	Bendigo International	(Chinese Taipei) Po Li-wei	(India) Hariharan Amsakarunan (India) Ruban Kumar	21–17, 21–14	(gold) Winner
2024	Portugal International	(Chinese Taipei) Chen Sheng-fa	(Chinese Taipei) Chen Zhi-ray (Chinese Taipei) Lin Yu-chieh	18–21, 16–21	(gold) Winner

Mixed doubles
Year	Tournament	Partner	Opponent	Score	Result
2024	Bendigo International	(Chinese Taipei) Lee Chih-chen	(Singapore) Wesley Koh (Singapore) Jin Yujia	13–21, 21–19, 20–22	(silver) Runner-up
2024	Sydney International	(Chinese Taipei) Hsu Yin-hui	(Australia) Andika Ramadiansyah (Australia) Nozomi Shimizu	26–24, 11–21, 21–11	(gold) Winner
2024	North Harbour International	(Chinese Taipei) Lee Chih-chen	(Australia) Edward Lau (Australia) Shaunna Li	21–3, 21–10	(gold) Winner

BWF International Challenge tournament
BWF International Series tournament
BWF Future Series tournament
