= 2026 Denmark Open =

Tournament details
- Dates: 13–18 October
- Edition: 75th
- Level: Super 750
- Total prize money: US$950,000
- Venue: Arena Fyn
- Location: Odense, Denmark

Champions
- Men's singles: (France) Alex Lanier
- Women's singles: (South Korea) An Se-young
- Men's doubles: (Indonesia) Fajar Alfian (Indonesia) Muhammad Shohibul Fikri
- Women's doubles: (Malaysia) Pearly Tan (Malaysia) Thinaah Muralitharan
- Mixed doubles: (China) Jiang Zhenbang (China) Wei Yaxin
- Official website: denmarkopen.dk

The 2026 Denmark Open (officially known as the Victor Denmark Open 2026 for sponsorship reasons) was a badminton tournament which took place at the Arena Fyn in Odense, Denmark, from 13 to 18 October 2026 and had a total prize of US$950,000.

== Tournament ==
The 2026 Denmark Open was the twenty-fifth tournament of the 2026 BWF World Tour. It was a part of the Denmark Open, which had been held since 1936. This tournament was organized by Badminton Denmark with sanction from the BWF.

The tournament was one of several HSBC BWF World Tour events selected to trial the federation's Time Clock system, which will be implemented in all matches. Under the regulations, the clock starts when the umpire updates the score, and players have 25 seconds to be ready to serve or receive. Umpires retain discretion to allow additional time in exceptional circumstances, including injuries, disputes and referee interventions.

=== Venue ===
This tournament was held at the Arena Fyn in Odense, Denmark.

=== Point distribution ===
Below was the point distribution table for each phase of the tournament based on the BWF points system for the BWF World Tour Super 750 event.

Winner	Runner-up	3/4	5/8	9/16	17/32
11,000	9,350	7,700	6,050	4,320	2,660

=== Prize pool ===
The total prize money was US$950,000 with the distribution of the prize money in accordance with BWF regulations.

Event	Winner	Finalist	Semi-finals	Quarter-finals	Last 16	Last 32
Singles	$66,500	$32,300	$13,300	$5,225	$2,850	$950
Doubles	$70,300	$33,250	$13,300	$5,937.50	$3,087.50	$950

== Men's singles ==
=== Seeds ===
1. (Thailand) Kunlavut Vitidsarn (first round)
2. (France) Christo Popov (semi-finals)
3. (Chinese Taipei) Chou Tien-chen (quarter-finals)
4. (Indonesia) Jonatan Christie (second round)
5. (Denmark) Anders Antonsen (final)
6. (Japan) Kodai Naraoka (second round)
7. (France) Alex Lanier (champion)
8. (Canada) Victor Lai (semi-finals)

=== Finals ===
Semi-finals
8	(Canada) Victor Lai	19	10
7	(France) Alex Lanier	21	21
5	(Denmark) Anders Antonsen	9	21	21
2	(France) Christo Popov	21	16	13

Final
7	(France) Alex Lanier	21	13	21
5	(Denmark) Anders Antonsen	15	21	13

=== Top half ===
==== Section 1 ====
First round
1	(Thailand) K Vitidsarn	21	17	12
(Denmark) R Gemke	13	21	21
(Hong Kong) Ng K L	21	20	21
(Japan) Y Tanaka	12	22	15
8	(Canada) V Lai	21	21
(Indonesia) Z Ubaidillah	8	18
(Singapore) J Teh	23	21
(Chinese Taipei) Lee C-h	21	15

Second round
(Denmark) R Gemke	21	21
(Hong Kong) Ng K L	12	18
8	(Canada) V Lai	21	21
(Singapore) J Teh	7	13

Quarter-finals
(Denmark) R Gemke	21	16	14
8	(Canada) V Lai	19	21	21

==== Section 2 ====
First round
3	(Chinese Taipei) Chou T-c	21	13	21
(India) L Sen	18	21	15
(Japan) K Watanabe	21	21
(Malaysia) Leong J H	6	19
7	(France) A Lanier	21	21
PFR	(China) Hu ZA	18	13
(France) A Merklé	20	19
(India) S Kidambi	22	21

Second round
3	(Chinese Taipei) Chou T-c	21	22
(Japan) K Watanabe	19	20
7	(France) A Lanier	11	21	21
(India) S Kidambi	21	15	15

Quarter-finals
3	(Chinese Taipei) Chou T-c	16	12
7	(France) A Lanier	21	21

=== Bottom half ===
==== Section 3 ====
First round
(Japan) K Nishimoto	16	16
(Hong Kong) J Gunawan	21	21
(Hong Kong) Lee C Y	21	11	18
5	(Denmark) A Antonsen	16	21	21
(Indonesia) A Farhan	21	13	21
(India) A Shetty	11	21	10
(Chinese Taipei) Lin C-y	13	14
4	(Indonesia) J Christie	21	21

Second round
(Hong Kong) J Gunawan	10	12
5	(Denmark) A Antonsen	21	21
(Indonesia) A Farhan	21	21
4	(Indonesia) J Christie	14	9

Quarter-finals
5	(Denmark) A Antonsen	21	21
(Indonesia) A Farhan	17	16

==== Section 4 ====
First round
(France) T J Popov	10	12
(Japan) Y Okimoto	21	21
(Chinese Taipei) Chi Y-j	20	11
6	(Japan) K Naraoka	22	21
(Republic of Ireland) N Nguyen	21	17	16
(Thailand) Pan Teeraratsakul	19	21	21
(China) Weng HY	13	21	13
2	(France) C Popov	21	19	21

Second round
(Japan) Y Okimoto	21	21
6	(Japan) K Naraoka	16	14
(Thailand) Pan Teeraratsakul	21	16	16
2	(France) C Popov	18	21	21

Quarter-finals
(Japan) Y Okimoto
2	(France) C Popov	w	/	o

== Women's singles ==
=== Seeds ===
1. (South Korea) An Se-young (champion)
2. (China) Wang Zhiyi (semi-finals)
3. (Japan) Akane Yamaguchi (final)
4. (Thailand) Ratchanok Intanon (withdrew)
5. (Indonesia) Putri Kusuma Wardani (quarter-finals)
6. (Japan) Tomoka Miyazaki (quarter-finals)
7. (China) Han Yue (withdrew)
8. (Thailand) Pornpawee Chochuwong (quarter-finals)

=== Finals ===
Semi-finals
1	(South Korea) An Se-young	21	21
SWM	(Japan) Nozomi Okuhara	16	8
3	(Japan) Akane Yamaguchi	21	21
2	(China) Wang Zhiyi	10	19

Final
1	(South Korea) An Se-young	21	21	21
3	(Japan) Akane Yamaguchi	23	14	18

=== Top half ===
==== Section 1 ====
First round
1	(South Korea) An S-y	21	21
PFR	(Ukraine) P Buhrova	13	11
(Malaysia) Letshanaa K	5	18
(Denmark) L Christophersen	21	21
SWM	(India) P. V. Sindhu	21	23	19
PFR	(Germany) Y Li	13	25	21
(Japan) N Nidaira	17	21	19
(India) T Sharma	21	16	21

Second round
1	(South Korea) An S-y	21	21
(Denmark) L Christophersen	17	9
PFR	(Germany) Y Li	17	19
(India) T Sharma	21	21

Quarter-finals
1	(South Korea) An S-y	21	21
(India) T Sharma	15	13

==== Section 2 ====
First round
6	(Japan) T Miyazaki	21	21
(Vietnam) Nguyễn T L	17	17
(Chinese Taipei) Lin H-t	15	17
(Japan) H Akechi	21	21
SWM	(Japan) N Okuhara	21	15	21
(Denmark) L Kjærsfeldt	14	21	15
(Chinese Taipei) Chiu P-c	21	21
(South Korea) Sim Y-j	16	14

Second round
6	(Japan) T Miyazaki	21	21
(Japan) H Akechi	18	15
SWM	(Japan) N Okuhara	21	21
(Chinese Taipei) Chiu P-c	15	9

Quarter-finals
6	(Japan) T Miyazaki	21	14	4^{r}
SWM	(Japan) N Okuhara	17	21	7

=== Bottom half ===
==== Section 3 ====
First round
(Japan) R Gunji	19	21	21
(Malaysia) Wong L C	21	11	19
(India) D Sihag	13	14
8	(Thailand) P Chochuwong	21	21
(India) A Chaliha	21	22
(Bulgaria) K Nalbantova	18	20
(Denmark) M Blichfeldt	15	21	18
3	(Japan) A Yamaguchi	21	13	21

Second round
(Japan) R Gunji	21	8	15
8	(Thailand) P Chochuwong	17	21	21
(India) A Chaliha	18	10
3	(Japan) A Yamaguchi	21	21

Quarter-finals
8	(Thailand) P Chochuwong	14	20
3	(Japan) A Yamaguchi	21	22

==== Section 4 ====
First round
(Chinese Taipei) Huang Y-h	21	13	21
(Turkey) N Arın	6	21	14
(Thailand) S Katethong	16	13
5	(Indonesia) P K Wardani	21	21
(India) U Hooda	21	21	16
(China) Han QX	23	16	21
(Canada) M Li	14	3^{r}
2	(China) Wang ZY	21	12

Second round
(Chinese Taipei) Huang Y-h	19	8
5	(Indonesia) P K Wardani	21	21
(China) Han QX	11	9
2	(China) Wang ZY	21	21

Quarter-finals
5	(Indonesia) P K Wardani	17	16
2	(China) Wang ZY	21	21

== Men's doubles ==
=== Seeds ===
1. (South Korea) Kim Won-ho / Seo Seung-jae (semi-finals)
2. (China) Liang Weikeng / Wang Chang (semi-finals)
3. (Indonesia) Fajar Alfian / Muhammad Shohibul Fikri (champions)
4. (Malaysia) Aaron Chia / Soh Wooi Yik (final)
5. (India) Satwiksairaj Rankireddy / Chirag Shetty (first round)
6. (Malaysia) Goh Sze Fei / Nur Izzuddin (quarter-finals)
7. (Indonesia) Sabar Karyaman Gutama / Muhammad Reza Pahlevi Isfahani (first round)
8. (England) Ben Lane / Sean Vendy (second round)

=== Finals ===
Semi-finals
1	(South Korea) Kim Won-ho (South Korea) Seo Seung-jae	14	18
4	(Malaysia) Aaron Chia (Malaysia) Soh Wooi Yik	21	21
3	(Indonesia) Fajar Alfian (Indonesia) Muhammad Shohibul Fikri	21	16	21
2	(China) Liang Weikeng (China) Wang Chang	16	21	16

Final
4	(Malaysia) Aaron Chia (Malaysia) Soh Wooi Yik	8	11
3	(Indonesia) Fajar Alfian (Indonesia) Muhammad Shohibul Fikri	21	21

=== Top half ===
==== Section 1 ====
First round
1	(South Korea) Kim W-h (South Korea) Seo S-j	21	21
(Denmark) D Lundgaard (Denmark) M Vestergaard	14	14
(Indonesia) L R Carnando (Indonesia) D Marthin
(China) Chen BY (China) Liu Y	w	/	o
8	(England) B Lane (England) S Vendy	21	21
(Indonesia) R Indra (Indonesia) N Joaquin	19	17
(Japan) K Kumagai (Japan) H Nishi	21	21
(France) C Popov (France) T J Popov	14	18

Second round
1	(South Korea) Kim W-h (South Korea) Seo S-j	15	21	21
(China) Chen BY (China) Liu Y	21	13	16
8	(England) B Lane (England) S Vendy	19	21
(Japan) K Kumagai (Japan) H Nishi	21	23

Quarter-finals
1	(South Korea) Kim W-h (South Korea) Seo S-j	21	21
(Japan) K Kumagai (Japan) H Nishi	5	17

==== Section 2 ====
First round
4	(Malaysia) A Chia (Malaysia) Soh W Y	21	14	21
(Japan) T Hoki (Japan) Y Kobayashi	19	21	11
(South Korea) Kang M-h (South Korea) Lee J-m	21	18	19
(Malaysia) A Tai (Malaysia) Yap R K	13	21	21
7	(Indonesia) S K Gutama (Indonesia) M R P Isfahani	18	21	10
(Japan) H Okamura (Japan) K Yamashita	21	19	21
(Indonesia) A F Rayhan (Indonesia) D A Wahyudi	14	20
(China) Hu KY (China) Lin XY	21	22

Second round
4	(Malaysia) A Chia (Malaysia) Soh W Y	21	21
(Malaysia) A Tai (Malaysia) Yap R K	18	11
(Japan) H Okamura (Japan) K Yamashita	23	21
(China) Hu KY (China) Lin XY	21	12

Quarter-finals
4	(Malaysia) A Chia (Malaysia) Soh W Y	21	21
(Japan) H Okamura (Japan) K Yamashita	16	18

=== Bottom half ===
==== Section 3 ====
First round
(Thailand) P Sukphun (Thailand) Pak Teeraratsakul	12	21	21
(Chinese Taipei) Lee J-h (Chinese Taipei) Yang P-h	21	16	14
(China) He JT (China) Ren XY	12	21	21
5	(India) S Rankireddy (India) C Shetty	21	15	19
(Denmark) C F Kjær (Denmark) R Kjær	21	22
(Malaysia) Man W C (Malaysia) Tee K W	16	20
(Denmark) K Astrup (Denmark) A S Rasmussen	22	14
3	(Indonesia) F Alfian (Indonesia) M S Fikri	24	21

Second round
(Thailand) P Sukphun (Thailand) Pak Teeraratsakul	21	13	22
(China) He JT (China) Ren XY	17	21	20
(Denmark) C F Kjær (Denmark) R Kjær	19	10
3	(Indonesia) F Alfian (Indonesia) M S Fikri	21	21

Quarter-finals
(Thailand) P Sukphun (Thailand) Pak Teeraratsakul	17	16
3	(Indonesia) F Alfian (Indonesia) M S Fikri	21	21

==== Section 4 ====
First round
(Chinese Taipei) Chen Z-r (Chinese Taipei) Lin Y-c	16	15
(Malaysia) Chia W J (Malaysia) Teo E Y	21	21
(Malaysia) N M Azriyn A (Malaysia) Tan W K	14	11
6	(Malaysia) Goh S F (Malaysia) N Izzuddin	21	21
(United States) Chen Z-y (United States) P Smith	19	21	16
(Chinese Taipei) Lee F-c (Chinese Taipei) Lee F-j	21	10	21
(Chinese Taipei) Chiu H-c (Chinese Taipei) Wang C-l	17	15
2	(China) Liang WK (China) Wang C	21	21

Second round
(Malaysia) Chia W J (Malaysia) Teo E Y	18	11
6	(Malaysia) Goh S F (Malaysia) N Izzuddin	21	21
(Chinese Taipei) Lee F-c (Chinese Taipei) Lee F-j	19	15
2	(China) Liang WK (China) Wang C	21	21

Quarter-finals
6	(Malaysia) Goh S F (Malaysia) N Izzuddin	21	18	15
2	(China) Liang WK (China) Wang C	18	21	21

== Women's doubles ==
=== Seeds ===
1. (Japan) Yuki Fukushima / Mayu Matsumoto (second round)
2. (Malaysia) Pearly Tan / Thinaah Muralitharan (champions)
3. (Japan) Rin Iwanaga / Kie Nakanishi (first round)
4. (Chinese Taipei) Hsu Yin-hui / Lin Jhih-yun (first round)
5. (Indonesia) Rachel Allessya Rose / Febi Setianingrum (second round)
6. (China) Bao Lijing / Cao Zihan (semi-finals)
7. (Japan) Sumire Nakade / Miyu Takahashi (semi-finals)
8. (Indonesia) Febriana Dwipuji Kusuma / Meilysa Trias Puspita Sari (first round)

=== Finals ===
Semi-finals
(Japan) Hinata Suzuki (Japan) Nao Yamakita	21	18	21
7	(Japan) Sumire Nakade (Japan) Miyu Takahashi	18	21	18
6	(China) Bao Lijing (China) Cao Zihan	16	14
2	(Malaysia) Pearly Tan (Malaysia) Thinaah Muralitharan	21	21

Final
(Japan) Hinata Suzuki (Japan) Nao Yamakita	18	11
2	(Malaysia) Pearly Tan (Malaysia) Thinaah Muralitharan	21	21

=== Top half ===
==== Section 1 ====
First round
(Chinese Taipei) Hsu Y-c (Chinese Taipei) Sung Y-h	13	21	19
(Japan) H Suzuki (Japan) N Yamakita	21	18	21
8	(Indonesia) F D Kusuma (Indonesia) M T Puspita Sari	21	20	14
(United States) L Lam (United States) A Lee	9	22	21
(China) Luo Y (China) Wang TG	21	21
(Turkey) B Erçetin (Turkey) N İnci	14	9

Second round
1	(Japan) Y Fukushima (Japan) M Matsumoto	6^{r}
(Japan) H Suzuki (Japan) N Yamakita	11
(United States) L Lam (United States) A Lee	21	13	21
(China) Luo Y (China) Wang TG	17	21	17

Quarter-finals
(Japan) H Suzuki (Japan) N Yamakita	21	19	21
(United States) L Lam (United States) A Lee	17	21	19

==== Section 2 ====
First round
3	(Japan) R Iwanaga (Japan) K Nakanishi	14	21	16
(Japan) S Hirota (Japan) A Sakuramoto	21	11	21
(Japan) R Hirokami (Japan) S Hobara	21	21
(England) A Harris (England) E van Leeuwen	5	18
7	(Japan) S Nakade (Japan) M Takahashi	21	23
(Chinese Taipei) Lin C-c (Chinese Taipei) Yang C-y	12	21
(Hong Kong) Lui L L (Hong Kong) Tsang H Y	21	18	21
(United States) F Corbett (United States) J Gai	18	21	15

Second round
(Japan) S Hirota (Japan) A Sakuramoto	21	21
(Japan) R Hirokami (Japan) S Hobara	13	15
7	(Japan) S Nakade (Japan) M Takahashi	21	21
(Hong Kong) Lui L L (Hong Kong) Tsang H Y	9	19

Quarter-finals
(Japan) S Hirota (Japan) A Sakuramoto	14	10
7	(Japan) S Nakade (Japan) M Takahashi	21	21

=== Bottom half ===
==== Section 3 ====
First round
(Japan) K Ishikawa (Japan) M Kawazoe	21	21
(Ukraine) P Buhrova (Ukraine) Y Kantemyr	19	18
(India) R Panda (India) S Panda	14	14
6	(China) Bao LJ (China) Cao ZH	21	21
(Indonesia) A C Pratiwi (Indonesia) S F S Ramadhanti	17	16
(South Korea) Kim Y-j (South Korea) Lee Y-l	21	21
(Bulgaria) G Stoeva (Bulgaria) S Stoeva	21	21
4	(Chinese Taipei) Hsu Y-h (Chinese Taipei) Lin J-y	14	16

Second round
(Japan) K Ishikawa (Japan) M Kawazoe	21	16	9
6	(China) Bao LJ (China) Cao ZH	17	21	21
(South Korea) Kim Y-j (South Korea) Lee Y-l	12	21	18
(Bulgaria) G Stoeva (Bulgaria) S Stoeva	21	15	21

Quarter-finals
6	(China) Bao LJ (China) Cao ZH	21	26
(Bulgaria) G Stoeva (Bulgaria) S Stoeva	12	24

==== Section 4 ====
First round
(Chinese Taipei) Chen Y-f (Chinese Taipei) Hsieh P-s	20	14
(India) T Jolly (India) G Gopichand	22	21
(Chinese Taipei) Chang C-h (Chinese Taipei) Yang C-t	18	18
5	(Indonesia) R A Rose (Indonesia) F Setianingrum	21	21
(Hong Kong) Yeung N T (Hong Kong) Yeung P L	21	21
(Scotland) J MacPherson (Scotland) C Torrance	16	13

Second round
(India) T Jolly (India) G Gopichand	21	21
5	(Indonesia) R A Rose (Indonesia) F Setianingrum	16	17
(Hong Kong) Yeung N T (Hong Kong) Yeung P L	12	19
2	(Malaysia) P Tan (Malaysia) T Muralitharan	21	21

Quarter-finals
(India) T Jolly (India) G Gopichand	21	17	11
2	(Malaysia) P Tan (Malaysia) T Muralitharan	14	21	21

== Mixed doubles ==
=== Seeds ===
1. (China) Feng Yanzhe / Huang Dongping (final)
2. (China) Jiang Zhenbang / Wei Yaxin (champions)
3. (Denmark) Mathias Christiansen / Alexandra Bøje (quarter-finals)
4. (France) Thom Gicquel / Delphine Delrue (second round)
5. (Thailand) Dechapol Puavaranukroh / Supissara Paewsampran (second round)
6. (China) Guo Xinwa / Chen Fanghui (quarter-finals)
7. (Chinese Taipei) Ye Hong-wei / Nicole Gonzales Chan (quarter-finals)
8. (China) Cheng Xing / Zhang Chi (semi-finals)

=== Finals ===
Semi-finals
1	(China) Feng Yanzhe (China) Huang Dongping	21	21
(Malaysia) Hoo Pang Ron (Malaysia) Lai Pei Jing	13	13
8	(China) Cheng Xing (China) Zhang Chi	21	12	13
2	(China) Jiang Zhenbang (China) Wei Yaxin	17	21	21

Final
1	(China) Feng Yanzhe (China) Huang Dongping	18	21	16
2	(China) Jiang Zhenbang (China) Wei Yaxin	21	8	21

=== Top half ===
==== Section 1 ====
First round
1	(China) Feng YZ (China) Huang DP	21	21
(Chinese Taipei) Wu H-y (Chinese Taipei) Yang C-y	19	9
(Thailand) Pak Teeraratsakul (Thailand) S Taerattanachai	16	16
(Chinese Taipei) Liu K-h (Chinese Taipei) Hsu Y-h	21	21
7	(Chinese Taipei) Ye H-w (Chinese Taipei) N G Chan	19	21	21
(Malaysia) Wong T C (Malaysia) Lim C S	21	16	19
(Hong Kong) Chan Y C (Hong Kong) Ng T Y	17	21	12
(China) Zhu YJ (China) Li Q	21	5	21

Second round
1	(China) Feng YZ (China) Huang DP	12	21	21
(Chinese Taipei) Liu K-h (Chinese Taipei) Hsu Y-h	21	10	14
7	(Chinese Taipei) Ye H-w (Chinese Taipei) N G Chan	21	21
(China) Zhu YJ (China) Li Q	12	10

Quarter-finals
1	(China) Feng YZ (China) Huang DP	21	21
7	(Chinese Taipei) Ye H-w (Chinese Taipei) N G Chan	15	14

==== Section 2 ====
First round
4	(France) T Gicquel (France) D Delrue	19	21	21
(South Korea) Kim J-h (South Korea) Jang H-j	21	19	13
(Japan) A Koga (Japan) N Saito	21	21
(England) C Hemming (England) E van Leeuwen	16	19
5	(Thailand) D Puavaranukroh (Thailand) S Paewsampran	21	21
(Chinese Taipei) Wu G-x (Chinese Taipei) Lee C-h	18	14
(Malaysia) Hoo P R (Malaysia) Lai P J	21	21
(Spain) R García (Spain) L Rodríguez	18	16

Second round
4	(France) T Gicquel (France) D Delrue	20	19
(Japan) A Koga (Japan) N Saito	22	21
5	(Thailand) D Puavaranukroh (Thailand) S Paewsampran	7	11
(Malaysia) Hoo P R (Malaysia) Lai P J	21	21

Quarter-finals
(Japan) A Koga (Japan) N Saito	15	22
(Malaysia) Hoo P R (Malaysia) Lai P J	21	24

=== Bottom half ===
==== Section 3 ====
First round
(Japan) Y Watanabe (Japan) M Taguchi	22	21
(China) Gao JX (China) Wu MY	20	16
(United States) P Smith (United States) J Gai	19	17
8	(China) Cheng X (China) Zhang C	21	21
(Malaysia) Goh S H (Malaysia) S J Lai	21	21
(United States) Chen Z-y (United States) F Corbett	15	13
(Scotland) A Dunn (Scotland) J MacPherson	12	10
3	(Denmark) M Christiansen (Denmark) A Bøje	21	21

Second round
(Japan) Y Watanabe (Japan) M Taguchi	17	22	20
8	(China) Cheng X (China) Zhang C	21	20	22
(Malaysia) Goh S H (Malaysia) S J Lai	7	18
3	(Denmark) M Christiansen (Denmark) A Bøje	21	21

Quarter-finals
8	(China) Cheng X (China) Zhang C	21	21
3	(Denmark) M Christiansen (Denmark) A Bøje	18	19

==== Section 4 ====
First round
(Malaysia) Chen T J (Malaysia) Chan W T	21	21
(Malaysia) J Wong (Malaysia) Cheng S Y	19	16
(Indonesia) A Syahnawi (Indonesia) N V Marwah	22	11
6	(China) Guo XW (China) Chen FH	24	21
(Chinese Taipei) Yang P-h (Chinese Taipei) Hu L-f	21	21
(Indonesia) D Ferdinansyah (Indonesia) F Pasaribu	13	16
(Thailand) T Punpanich (Thailand) J Sudjaipraparat	16	17
2	(China) Jiang ZB (China) Wei YX	21	21

Second round
(Malaysia) Chen T J (Malaysia) Chan W T	23	18	20
6	(China) Guo XW (China) Chen FH	21	21	22
(Chinese Taipei) Yang P-h (Chinese Taipei) Hu L-f	9	11
2	(China) Jiang ZB (China) Wei YX	21	21

Quarter-finals
6	(China) Guo XW (China) Chen FH
2	(China) Jiang ZB (China) Wei YX	w	/	o

Preceded by 2026 Arctic Open	BWF World Tour; 2026 BWF season	Succeeded by 2026 French Open; 2026 Indonesia Masters Super 100 II
