= 2026 Orléans Masters =

Badminton tournament in France

Tournament details
- Dates: 17–22 March
- Edition: 14th
- Level: Super 300
- Total prize money: US$250,000
- Venue: Palais des Sports
- Location: Orléans, France

Champions
- Men's singles: (France) Alex Lanier
- Women's singles: (Japan) Nozomi Okuhara
- Men's doubles: (China) Hu Keyuan (China) Lin Xiangyi
- Women's doubles: (Japan) Sumire Nakade (Japan) Miyu Takahashi
- Mixed doubles: (France) Thom Gicquel (France) Delphine Delrue

The 2026 Orléans Masters (officially known as the Orléans Masters Badminton presented by Victor 2026 for sponsorship reasons) was badminton tournament that took place at the Palais des Sports, Orléans, France, from 17 to 22 March 2026 and had a total prize of US$250,000.

== Tournament ==
The 2026 Orléans Masters was the ninth tournament of the 2026 BWF World Tour and is part of the Orléans Masters championships, which have been held since 2012. This tournament is organized by the Orléans Masters with sanction from the BWF.

=== Venue ===
This tournament was held at the Palais des Sports in Orléans, France.

=== Point distribution ===
Below is the point distribution table for each phase of the tournament based on the BWF points system for the BWF World Tour Super 300 event.

Winner	Runner-up	3/4	5/8	9/16	17/32	33/64	65/128
7,000	5,950	4,900	3,850	2,750	1,670	660	320

=== Prize pool ===
The total prize money is US$250,000 with the distribution of the prize money in accordance with BWF regulations.

Event	Winner	Finalist	Semi-finals	Quarter-finals	Last 16
Singles	$18,750	$9,500	$3,625	$1,500	$875
Doubles	$19,750	$9,500	$3,500	$1,812.50	$937.50

== Men's singles ==
=== Seeds ===
1. (Chinese Taipei) Chou Tien-chen (quarter-finals)
2. (France) Alex Lanier (champion)
3. (Japan) Kenta Nishimoto (withdrew)
4. (France) Toma Junior Popov (final)
5. (Chinese Taipei) Chi Yu-jen (first round)
6. (Japan) Yushi Tanaka (second round)
7. (Denmark) Rasmus Gemke (first round)
8. (India) Ayush Shetty (second round)

=== Finals ===
Semi-finals
Q2	(China) Hu Zhe'an	16	14
4	(France) Toma Junior Popov	21	21
(Japan) Yudai Okimoto	14	12
2	(France) Alex Lanier	21	21

Final
4	(France) Toma Junior Popov	11	13
2	(France) Alex Lanier	21	21

=== Top half ===
==== Section 1 ====
First round
1	(Chinese Taipei) Chou T-c	21	21
PFQ	(Thailand) K Wangcharoen	13	17
(Indonesia) A S Ginting	22	21
PFQ	(Chinese Taipei) Liao J-f	20	5
6	(Japan) Y Tanaka	21	21
(Indonesia) Z Ubaidillah	15	11
Q2	(China) Hu ZA	21	21
(Hong Kong) J Gunawan	18	14

Second round
1	(Chinese Taipei) Chou T-c	21	21
(Indonesia) A S Ginting	14	10
6	(Japan) Y Tanaka	18	21	18
Q2	(China) Hu ZA	21	17	21

Quarter-finals
1	(Chinese Taipei) Chou T-c	21	18	16
Q2	(China) Hu ZA	12	21	21

==== Section 2 ====
First round
4	(France) T J Popov	21	21
Q1	(China) Zhu XC	17	13
(Chinese Taipei) Wang T-w	21	14	23
(India) T Mannepalli	18	21	21
7	(Denmark) R Gemke	17	13
(Chinese Taipei) Wang P-w	21	21
Q3	(China) Dong TY	21	21
(Finland) J Oldorff	17	15

Second round
4	(France) T J Popov	21	14	21
(Chinese Taipei) Wang T-w	19	21	15
(Chinese Taipei) Wang P-w	13	16
Q3	(China) Dong TY	21	21

Quarter-finals
4	(France) T J Popov	22	21
Q3	(China) Dong TY	20	13

=== Bottom half ===
==== Section 3 ====
First round
(India) S Kidambi	12	10
(Denmark) M Johannesen	21	21
(Chinese Taipei) Lee C-h	21	12	14
SWM	(China) Wang ZX	11	21	21
(Japan) Y Okimoto	21	21
Q4	(France) E Roy	13	17
(India) K George	21	10	17
8	(India) A Shetty	17	21	21

Second round
(Denmark) M Johannesen	17	21	21
SWM	(China) Wang ZX	21	19	12
(Japan) Y Okimoto	9	21	21
8	(India) A Shetty	21	18	9

Quarter-finals
(Denmark) M Johannesen	12	15
(Japan) Y Okimoto	21	21

==== Section 4 ====
First round
(Chinese Taipei) Su L-y	21	21
(Finland) K Koljonen	13	16
(Malaysia) J Hoh	21	14	24
5	(Chinese Taipei) Chi Y-j	9	21	22
(Belgium) J Carraggi	20	19
(Thailand) P Teeraratsakul	22	21
(France) A Merklé	13	16
2	(France) A Lanier	21	21

Second round
(Chinese Taipei) Su L-y	16	21	22
(Malaysia) J Hoh	21	17	20
(Thailand) P Teeraratsakul	12	16
2	(France) A Lanier	21	21

Quarter-finals
(Chinese Taipei) Su L-y	14	15
2	(France) A Lanier	21	21

== Women's singles ==
=== Seeds ===
1. (Chinese Taipei) Chiu Pin-chian (first round)
2. (Thailand) Supanida Katethong (first round)
3. (Chinese Taipei) Lin Hsiang-ti (first round)
4. (Denmark) Line Christophersen (first round)
5. (Japan) Nozomi Okuhara (champion)
6. (Japan) Natsuki Nidaira (quarter-finals)
7. (Japan) Riko Gunji (quarter-finals)
8. (United States) Beiwen Zhang (first round)

=== Finals ===
Semi-finals
(Thailand) Pitchamon Opatniputh	21	23
(India) Isharani Baruah	12	21
5	(Japan) Nozomi Okuhara	21	21
(India) Tanvi Sharma	9	16

Final
(Thailand) Pitchamon Opatniputh	15	15
5	(Japan) Nozomi Okuhara	21	21

=== Top half ===
==== Section 1 ====
First round
1	(Chinese Taipei) Chiu P-c	13	17
(Thailand) P Opatniputh	21	21
Q2	(Chinese Taipei) Pai Y-p	15	21	21
(Malaysia) Letshanaa K	21	16	9
7	(Japan) R Gunji	21	21
PFQ	(Germany) Y Li	12	16
(Singapore) Yeo J M	21	21
Q3	(India) A Kashyap	18	10

Second round
(Thailand) P Opatniputh	21	21
Q2	(Chinese Taipei) Pai Y-p	18	10
7	(Japan) R Gunji	21	21
(Singapore) Yeo J M	18	14

Quarter-finals
(Thailand) P Opatniputh	21	12	21
7	(Japan) R Gunji	19	21	16

==== Section 2 ====
First round
4	(Denmark) L Christophersen	13	16
(Canada) W Y Zhang	21	21
(India) I Baruah	21	21
Q1	(Denmark) A Schulz	19	19
8	(United States) BW Zhang	19	21	21
(Malaysia) Wong L C	21	13	23
(India) M Bansod	21	21
(Chinese Taipei) Sung S-y	18	14

Second round
(Canada) W Y Zhang	11	21	17
(India) I Baruah	21	14	21
(Malaysia) Wong L C	22	13
(India) M Bansod	24	21

Quarter-finals
(India) I Baruah	21	15
(India) M Bansod	9	7^{r}

=== Bottom half ===
==== Section 3 ====
First round
(Japan) M Suizu	21	21
(India) R Ramraj	9	15
(Japan) H Akechi	21	13	17
5	(Japan) N Okuhara	19	21	21
(India) D Sihag	21	14	15
Q4	(Hong Kong) Lo S Y	15	21	21
(Vietnam) Nguyễn T L	21	20	22
3	(Chinese Taipei) Lin H-t	19	22	20

Second round
(Japan) M Suizu	19	11
5	(Japan) N Okuhara	21	21
Q4	(Hong Kong) Lo S Y	12	14
(Vietnam) Nguyễn T L	21	21

Quarter-finals
5	(Japan) N Okuhara	21	21
(Vietnam) Nguyễn T L	18	8

==== Section 4 ====
First round
(Chinese Taipei) Hsu W-c	21	20	23
(Chinese Taipei) Huang Y-h	8	22	21
WC	(France) A Tatranova	12	20
6	(Japan) N Nidaira	21	22
(India) A Kharb	21	21
(Turkey) N Arın	12	16
(India) T Sharma	21	14
2	(Thailand) S Katethong	18	12^{r}

Second round
(Chinese Taipei) Hsu W-c	22	19	14
6	(Japan) N Nidaira	20	21	21
(India) A Kharb	14	17
(India) T Sharma	21	21

Quarter-finals
6	(Japan) N Nidaira	14	14
(India) T Sharma	21	21

== Men's doubles ==
=== Seeds ===
1. (Denmark) Kim Astrup / Anders Skaarup Rasmussen (withdrew)
2. (Indonesia) Raymond Indra / Nikolaus Joaquin (quarter-finals)
3. (Indonesia) Leo Rolly Carnando / Bagas Maulana (semi-finals)
4. (Chinese Taipei) Liu Kuang-heng / Yang Po-han (withdrew)
5. (Denmark) Daniel Lundgaard / Mads Vestergaard (withdrew)
6. (Japan) Kakeru Kumagai / Hiroki Nishi (quarter-finals)
7. (Malaysia) Kang Khai Xing / Aaron Tai (second round)
8. (Indonesia) Muhammad Rian Ardianto / Rahmat Hidayat (first round)

=== Finals ===
Semi-finals
3	(Indonesia) Leo Rolly Carnando (Indonesia) Bagas Maulana	19	10
(China) Hu Keyuan (China) Lin Xiangyi	21	21
SWM	(Japan) Hiroki Okamura (Japan) Kyohei Yamashita	21	21
(Denmark) Christian Faust Kjær (Denmark) Rasmus Kjær	18	19

Final
(China) Hu Keyuan (China) Lin Xiangyi	21	21
SWM	(Japan) Hiroki Okamura (Japan) Kyohei Yamashita	19	14

=== Top half ===
==== Section 1 ====
First round
3	(Indonesia) L R Carnando (Indonesia) B Maulana	21	21
(Chinese Taipei) Chen C-k (Chinese Taipei) Lin B-w	13	15
(France) B Labarthe (France) Q Ronget	20	21	21
PFQ	(Belgium) I van Delsen (Belgium) Y van Delsen	22	19	13
SWM	(India) H Amsakarunan (India) Arjun M. R.	21
(Czech Republic) J Král (Czech Republic) O Král	10^{r}
(Scotland) A Dunn (Scotland) A Pringle	w	/	o
Q2

Second round
3	(Indonesia) L R Carnando (Indonesia) B Maulana	21	21
(France) B Labarthe (France) Q Ronget	17	16
SWM	(India) H Amsakarunan (India) Arjun M. R.	26	21
(Scotland) A Dunn (Scotland) A Pringle	24	14

Quarter-finals
3	(Indonesia) L R Carnando (Indonesia) B Maulana	21	22
SWM	(India) H Amsakarunan (India) Arjun M. R.	12	20

==== Section 2 ====
First round
6	(Japan) K Kumagai (Japan) H Nishi	21	21
PFQ	(England) A Green (England) Z Russ	12	16
Q4
PFQ	(Serbia) M Tomic (France) A Tores	w	/	o
SWM	(Chinese Taipei) He Z-w (Chinese Taipei) Huang J-h	18	16
(China) Hu KY (China) Lin XY	21	21
(France) J Maio (France) W Villeger	17	25	21
(Thailand) P Sukphun (Thailand) P Teeraratsakul	21	23	13

Second round
6	(Japan) K Kumagai (Japan) H Nishi	21	21
PFQ	(Serbia) M Tomic (France) A Tores	19	9
(China) Hu KY (China) Lin XY	21	18	21
(France) J Maio (France) W Villeger	18	21	11

Quarter-finals
6	(Japan) K Kumagai (Japan) H Nishi	21	19	9
(China) Hu KY (China) Lin XY	12	21	21

=== Bottom half ===
==== Section 3 ====
First round
(Singapore) W Koh (Singapore) J Kubo	24	21	21
Q1	(Netherlands) A Buijk (Netherlands) B Wassink	26	9	13
(Scotland) C Grimley (Scotland) M Grimley	14^{r}
SWM	(Japan) H Okamura (Japan) K Yamashita	18
PFQ	(India) A Doddavarapu (India) A Pochana	7	9
(Chinese Taipei) Lai P-y (Chinese Taipei) Tsai F-c	21	21
PFQ	(Germany) B Geiss (Germany) J R Jansen	21	16	21
8	(Indonesia) M R Ardianto (Indonesia) R Hidayat	19	21	16

Second round
(Singapore) W Koh (Singapore) J Kubo	8	15
SWM	(Japan) H Okamura (Japan) K Yamashita	21	21
(Chinese Taipei) Lai P-y (Chinese Taipei) Tsai F-c	21	21
PFQ	(Germany) B Geiss (Germany) J R Jansen	12	16

Quarter-finals
SWM	(Japan) H Okamura (Japan) K Yamashita	17	21	21
(Chinese Taipei) Lai P-y (Chinese Taipei) Tsai F-c	21	19	13

==== Section 4 ====
First round
(Denmark) C F Kjær (Denmark) R Kjær	21	21
(Chinese Taipei) Chang K-c (Chinese Taipei) Po L-w	7	13
(Individual Neutral Athletes) R Alimov (Individual Neutral Athletes) M Ogloblin	11	17
7	(Malaysia) Kang K X (Malaysia) A Tai	21	21
Q3
(France) M Cattoen (France) L Renoir	w	/	o
(Singapore) D Wee (Singapore) H Wong	13	16
2	(Indonesia) R Indra (Indonesia) N Joaquin	21	21

Second round
(Denmark) C F Kjær (Denmark) R Kjær	21	21
7	(Malaysia) Kang K X (Malaysia) A Tai	17	13
(France) M Cattoen (France) L Renoir	21	9	18
2	(Indonesia) R Indra (Indonesia) N Joaquin	19	21	21

Quarter-finals
(Denmark) C F Kjær (Denmark) R Kjær	21	12	21
2	(Indonesia) R Indra (Indonesia) N Joaquin	18	21	14

== Women's doubles ==
=== Seeds ===
1. (Bulgaria) Gabriela Stoeva / Stefani Stoeva (withdrew)
2. (Chinese Taipei) Hsu Yin-hui / Lin Jhih-yun (second round)
3. (Chinese Taipei) Hsu Ya-ching / Sung Yu-hsuan (quarter-finals)
4. (Japan) Rui Hirokami / Sayaka Hobara (semi-finals)
5. (Indonesia) Febriana Dwipuji Kusuma / Meilysa Trias Puspita Sari (second round)
6. (France) Margot Lambert / Camille Pognante (quarter-finals)
7. (Chinese Taipei) Chang Ching-hui / Yang Ching-tun (first round)
8. (Indonesia) Rachel Allessya Rose / Febi Setianingrum (semi-finals)

=== Finals ===
Semi-finals
8	(Indonesia) Rachel Allessya Rose (Indonesia) Febi Setianingrum	10	20
(Japan) Sumire Nakade (Japan) Miyu Takahashi	21	22
4	(Japan) Rui Hirokami (Japan) Sayaka Hobara	21	19	18
(Chinese Taipei) Lin Chih-chun (Chinese Taipei) Yang Chu-yun	17	21	21

Final
(Japan) Sumire Nakade (Japan) Miyu Takahashi	22	12	21
(Chinese Taipei) Lin Chih-chun (Chinese Taipei) Yang Chu-yun	20	21	18

=== Top half ===
==== Section 1 ====
First round
(Chinese Taipei) Hu L-f (Chinese Taipei) Jheng Y-c	19	13
(China) Luo Y (China) Wang TG	21	21
(Denmark) S Pilgaard (Denmark) S Schulz
(Chinese Taipei) Chen S-y (Chinese Taipei) Lee Y-h	w	/	o

Second round
3	(Chinese Taipei) Hsu Y-c (Chinese Taipei) Sung Y-h	21	22	21
(China) Luo Y (China) Wang TG	7	24	17
8	(Indonesia) R A Rose (Indonesia) F Setianingrum	14	21	21
(Chinese Taipei) Chen S-y (Chinese Taipei) Lee Y-h	21	6	13

Quarter-finals
3	(Chinese Taipei) Hsu Y-c (Chinese Taipei) Sung Y-h	14	15
8	(Indonesia) R A Rose (Indonesia) F Setianingrum	21	21

==== Section 2 ====
First round
5	(Indonesia) F D Kusuma (Indonesia) M T Puspita Sari	w	/	o
(Denmark) K Vang (Denmark) M Werge
(Japan) S Nakade (Japan) M Takahashi	21	21
(Netherlands) K de Wit (Netherlands) M Loos	16	15
SWM	(United States) L Lam (United States) A Lee	21	21
(Netherlands) D Jille (Germany) I Lohau	19	17
(France) E Guilbard (France) A Nambot	7	10
(Malaysia) Ong X Y (Malaysia) C Ting	21	21

Second round
5	(Indonesia) F D Kusuma (Indonesia) M T Puspita Sari	19	13
(Japan) S Nakade (Japan) M Takahashi	21	21
SWM	(United States) L Lam (United States) A Lee	21	21	22
(Malaysia) Ong X Y (Malaysia) C Ting	23	18	20

Quarter-finals
(Japan) S Nakade (Japan) M Takahashi	21	21
SWM	(United States) L Lam (United States) A Lee	12	14

=== Bottom half ===
==== Section 3 ====
First round
(Chinese Taipei) Lin X-m (Chinese Taipei) Wang Y-q	15	21	21
(China) Li YJ (China) Wang YD	21	14	11
(China) Bao LJ (China) Luo XM	21	21
7	(Chinese Taipei) Chang C-h (Chinese Taipei) Yang C-t	4	10
(Thailand) H Mijad (Thailand) N Tungkasatan	21	16	21
(Japan) H Suzuki (Japan) N Yamakita	18	21	18
(India) A Bhat (India) S Gautam
4	(Japan) R Hirokami (Japan) S Hobara	w	/	o

Second round
(Chinese Taipei) Lin X-m (Chinese Taipei) Wang Y-q	7	15
(China) Bao LJ (China) Luo XM	21	21
(Thailand) H Mijad (Thailand) N Tungkasatan	13	10
4	(Japan) R Hirokami (Japan) S Hobara	21	21

Quarter-finals
(China) Bao LJ (China) Luo XM	21	24	17
4	(Japan) R Hirokami (Japan) S Hobara	16	26	21

==== Section 4 ====
First round
(Indonesia) I S Meida (Indonesia) R K Nastine
(Turkey) B Erçetin (Turkey) N İnci	w	/	o
(Scotland) J MacPherson (Scotland) C Torrance
6	(France) M Lambert (France) C Pognante	w	/	o
(Republic of Ireland) K Frost (Republic of Ireland) P Woods	4	11
(Chinese Taipei) Lin C-c (Chinese Taipei) Yang C-y	21	21

Second round
(Turkey) B Erçetin (Turkey) N İnci	15	16
6	(France) M Lambert (France) C Pognante	21	21
(Chinese Taipei) Lin C-c (Chinese Taipei) Yang C-y	26	23
2	(Chinese Taipei) Hsu Y-h (Chinese Taipei) Lin J-y	24	21

Quarter-finals
6	(France) M Lambert (France) C Pognante	24	14	13
(Chinese Taipei) Lin C-c (Chinese Taipei) Yang C-y	22	21	21

== Mixed doubles ==
=== Seeds ===
1. (France) Thom Gicquel / Delphine Delrue (champions)
2. (Denmark) Mathias Christiansen / Alexandra Bøje (final)
3. (Chinese Taipei) Ye Hong-wei / Nicole Gonzales Chan (withdrew)
4. (Denmark) Jesper Toft / Amalie Magelund (withdrew)
5. (China) Cheng Xing / Zhang Chi (quarter-finals)
6. (Thailand) Ruttanapak Oupthong / Jhenicha Sudjaipraparat (first round)
7. (Indonesia) Amri Syahnawi / Nita Violina Marwah (quarter-finals)
8. (Indonesia) Adnan Maulana / Indah Cahya Sari Jamil (first round)

=== Finals ===
Semi-finals
1	(France) Thom Gicquel (France) Delphine Delrue	18	21	21
(Chinese Taipei) Liu Kuang-heng (Chinese Taipei) Jheng Yu-chieh	21	18	16
(Spain) Ruben Garcia (Spain) Lucia Rodriguez	18	21	14
2	(Denmark) Mathias Christiansen (Denmark) Alexandra Bøje	21	14	21

Final
1	(France) Thom Gicquel (France) Delphine Delrue	21	21
2	(Denmark) Mathias Christiansen (Denmark) Alexandra Bøje	19	13

=== Top half ===
==== Section 1 ====
First round
1	(France) T Gicquel (France) D Delrue	21	21
(Chinese Taipei) Chen C-k (Chinese Taipei) Hsu Y-h	17	10
Q1	(Chinese Taipei) Tsai F-c (Chinese Taipei) Sung Y-hs	15	9
(India) R Kapoor (India) R Gadde	21	21
5	(China) Cheng X (China) Zhang C	21	10	21
(Thailand) P Teeraratsakul (Thailand) S Taerattanachai	11	21	14
(Scotland) A Dunn (Scotland) J MacPherson	21	21
(Denmark) R Espersen (Denmark) A C Kudsk	17	14

Second round
1	(France) T Gicquel (France) D Delrue	19	21	21
(India) R Kapoor (India) R Gadde	21	9	14
5	(China) Cheng X (China) Zhang C	21	21
(Scotland) A Dunn (Scotland) J MacPherson	14	19

Quarter-finals
1	(France) T Gicquel (France) D Delrue	21	21	21
5	(China) Cheng X (China) Zhang C	9	23	17

==== Section 2 ====
First round
4	(Denmark) J Toft (Denmark) A Magelund
Q4	(Algeria) K Mammeri (Algeria) T Mammeri	w	/	o
(Chinese Taipei) Wu G-x (Chinese Taipei) Lee C-h	12	13
(Chinese Taipei) Liu K-h (Chinese Taipei) Jheng Y-c	21	21
8	(Indonesia) A Maulana (Indonesia) I C Jamil	24	21	21
PFQ	(Japan) Y Watanabe (Japan) M Taguchi	26	14	23
(England) C Hemming (England) E van Leeuwen	23	21	21
(China) Gao JX (China) Wu MY	25	19	11

Second round
Q4	(Algeria) K Mammeri (Algeria) T Mammeri	14	12
(Chinese Taipei) Liu K-h (Chinese Taipei) Jheng Y-c	21	21
PFQ	(Japan) Y Watanabe (Japan) M Taguchi	21	21
(England) C Hemming (England) E van Leeuwen	9	12

Quarter-finals
(Chinese Taipei) Liu K-h (Chinese Taipei) Jheng Y-c	21	21
PFQ	(Japan) Y Watanabe (Japan) M Taguchi	12	15

=== Bottom half ===
==== Section 3 ====
First round
(Serbia) M Tomic (Serbia) A Vitman	18	15
(China) Zhu YJ (China) Li Q	21	21
(Indonesia) D Ferdinansyah (Indonesia) B Wardana	21	21
SWM	(India) D Kapila (India) T Crasto	14	18
PFQ	(Japan) A Koga (Japan) N Saito	21	21
(Malaysia) Wong T C (Malaysia) Lim C S	17	4
(Spain) R Garcia (Spain) L Rodriguez	21	25
6	(Thailand) R Oupthong (Thailand) J Sudjaipraparat	17	23

Second round
(China) Zhu YJ (China) Li Q	21	18	22
(Indonesia) D Ferdinansyah (Indonesia) B Wardana	14	21	20
PFQ	(Japan) A Koga (Japan) N Saito	22	21	19
(Spain) R Garcia (Spain) L Rodriguez	20	23	21

Quarter-finals
(China) Zhu YJ (China) Li Q	23	21	19
(Spain) R Garcia (Spain) L Rodriguez	21	23	21

==== Section 4 ====
First round
PFQ	(France) N Begga (France) E Jacob	20	17
Q3	(Netherlands) B Wassink (Netherlands) D Jille	22	21
(Thailand) P Horbanluekit (Thailand) B Aimsaard	21	18	16
7	(Indonesia) A Syahnawi (Indonesia) N V Marwah	17	21	21
(Chinese Taipei) Yang P-hs (Chinese Taipei) Hu L-f	16	22	18
(Chinese Taipei) Wu H-y (Chinese Taipei) Yang C-y	21	20	21
Q2	(Chinese Taipei) Lai P-y (Chinese Taipei) Lin X-m	11	14
2	(Denmark) M Christiansen (Denmark) A Bøje	21	21

Second round
Q3	(Netherlands) B Wassink (Netherlands) D Jille	13	12
7	(Indonesia) A Syahnawi (Indonesia) N V Marwah	21	21
(Chinese Taipei) Wu H-y (Chinese Taipei) Yang C-y	21	19	12
2	(Denmark) M Christiansen (Denmark) A Bøje	18	21	21

Quarter-finals
7	(Indonesia) A Syahnawi (Indonesia) N V Marwah	19	16
2	(Denmark) M Christiansen (Denmark) A Bøje	21	21

Preceded by 2026 Swiss Open; 2026 Ruichang China Masters	BWF World Tour; 2026 BWF season	Succeeded by 2026 Thailand Open; 2026 Baoji China Masters
