= 2026 China Masters =

2026 badminton tournament in China

Tournament details
- Dates: 1–6 September
- Edition: 19th
- Level: Super 750
- Total prize money: US$1,250,000
- Venue: Shenzhen Arena
- Location: Shenzhen, China

Champions
- Men's singles: (Hong Kong) Jason Gunawan
- Women's singles: (South Korea) An Se-young
- Men's doubles: (India) Satwiksairaj Rankireddy (India) Chirag Shetty
- Women's doubles: (Japan) Sumire Nakade (Japan) Miyu Takahashi
- Mixed doubles: (China) Feng Yanzhe (China) Huang Dongping

The 2026 China Masters (officially known as the Li-Ning China Masters 2026 for sponsorship reasons) was a badminton tournament that took place at Shenzhen Arena in Shenzhen, China, from 1 to 6 September 2026, and featured a total prize pool of $1,250,000.

== Tournament ==
The 2026 China Masters was the twenty-third tournament of the 2026 BWF World Tour and is also part of the China Masters championships, which have been held since 2005. This tournament is organized by the Chinese Badminton Association and is sanctioned by the BWF.

=== Venue ===
This international tournament was held at Shenzhen Arena in Shenzhen, China.

=== Point distribution ===
Below is the point distribution table for each phase of the tournament based on the BWF points system for the BWF World Tour Super 750 event.

Winner	Runner-up	3/4	5/8	9/16	17/32
11,000	9,350	7,700	6,050	4,320	2,660

=== Prize money ===
The total prize money for this tournament was US$1,250,000. Distribution of prize money was in accordance with BWF regulations.

Event	Winner	Finals	Semi-finals	Quarter-finals	Last 16	Last 32
Singles	$85,100	$40,250	$17,500	$6,875	$3,750	$1,250
Doubles	$92,500	$43,750	$17,500	$7,812.50	$4,062.50	$1,250

== Men's singles ==
=== Seeds ===
1. (Indonesia) Jonatan Christie (second round)
2. (France) Christo Popov (semi-finals)
3. (Thailand) Kunlavut Vitidsarn (quarter-finals)
4. (Chinese Taipei) Chou Tien-chen (first round)
5. (Denmark) Anders Antonsen (semi-finals)
6. (China) Shi Yuqi (first round)
7. (France) Alex Lanier (withdrew)
8. (Japan) Kodai Naraoka (quarter-finals)

=== Finals ===
Semi-finals
(Hong Kong) Jason Gunawan	15	22	21
5	(Denmark) Anders Antonsen	21	20	16
(Hong Kong) Lee Cheuk Yiu	21	21
2	(France) Christo Popov	15	19

Final
(Hong Kong) Jason Gunawan	21	21
(Hong Kong) Lee Cheuk Yiu	9	16

=== Top half ===
==== Section 1 ====
First round
1	(Indonesia) J Christie	21	21
(Malaysia) Leong J H	17	19
(Japan) K Watanabe	12	17
(Hong Kong) J Gunawan	21	21
6	(China) Shi YQ	11	10
(Singapore) Loh K Y	21	21
(Singapore) J Teh	13	12
(China) Weng HY	21	21

Second round
1	(Indonesia) J Christie	16	16
(Hong Kong) J Gunawan	21	21
(Singapore) Loh K Y	18	21	17
(China) Weng HY	21	11	21

Quarter-finals
(Hong Kong) J Gunawan	21	21
(China) Weng HY	18	13

==== Section 2 ====
First round
3	(Thailand) K Vitidsarn	15	21	22
(Japan) Y Tanaka	21	14	20
(China) Lu GZ	21	21
PFR	(England) Wang YH	3	5
5	(Denmark) A Antonsen	19	21	21
(China) Hu ZA	21	11	16
(Denmark) R Gemke	17	14
(Japan) K Nishimoto	21	21

Second round
3	(Thailand) K Vitidsarn	21	21
(China) Lu GZ	17	12
5	(Denmark) A Antonsen	21	21
(Japan) K Nishimoto	11	9

Quarter-finals
3	(Thailand) K Vitidsarn	21	17	18
5	(Denmark) A Antonsen	18	21	21

=== Bottom half ===
==== Section 3 ====
First round
(Chinese Taipei) Chi Y-j	16	15
(India) S Kidambi	21	21
(India) L Sen	14	7
SWM	(Canada) V Lai	21	21
(Hong Kong) Ng K L	8	21	17
(Hong Kong) Lee C Y	21	18	21
(France) T J Popov	22	21
4	(Chinese Taipei) Chou T-c	20	15

Second round
(India) S Kidambi	21	21
SWM	(Canada) V Lai	18	19
(Hong Kong) Lee C Y	21	24
(France) T J Popov	19	22

Quarter-finals
(India) S Kidambi	16	16
(Hong Kong) Lee C Y	21	21

==== Section 4 ====
First round
(Chinese Taipei) Lee C-h	5	16
(Canada) B Yang	21	21
(China) Li SF	18	7
8	(Japan) K Naraoka	21	21
PFR	(Belgium) J Carraggi	21	12	21
(Japan) Y Okimoto	13	21	18
(Thailand) Pan Teeraratsakul	21	21	16
2	(France) C Popov	9	23	21

Second round
(Canada) B Yang	16	11
8	(Japan) K Naraoka	21	21
PFR	(Belgium) J Carraggi	14	21	6
2	(France) C Popov	21	10	21

Quarter-finals
8	(Japan) K Naraoka	10	14
2	(France) C Popov	21	21

== Women's singles ==
=== Seeds ===
1. (South Korea) An Se-young (champion)
2. (China) Wang Zhiyi (semi-finals)
3. (Japan) Akane Yamaguchi (semi-finals)
4. (China) Chen Yufei (withdrew)
5. (China) Han Yue (withdrew)
6. (Thailand) Ratchanok Intanon (second round)
7. (Indonesia) Putri Kusuma Wardani (withdrew)
8. (Thailand) Pornpawee Chochuwong (first round)

=== Finals ===
Semi-finals
1	(South Korea) An Se-young	21	21
3	(Japan) Akane Yamaguchi	13	15
SWM	(Japan) Tomoka Miyazaki	21	23
2	(China) Wang Zhiyi	19	21

Final
1	(South Korea) An Se-young	21	21
SWM	(Japan) Tomoka Miyazaki	17	6

=== Top half ===
==== Section 1 ====
First round
1	(South Korea) An S-y	21	21
(Chinese Taipei) Lin H-t	11	3
(China) Han QX	21	21
PFR	(Chinese Taipei) Pai Y-p	10	9
SWM	(South Korea) Kim G-e	21	21
(India) U Hooda	10	18
(Denmark) L Christophersen	21	11	21
(Japan) R Gunji	15	21	11

Second round
1	(South Korea) An S-y	21	21
(China) Han QX	14	7
SWM	(South Korea) Kim G-e	21	21
(Denmark) L Christophersen	17	19

Quarter-finals
1	(South Korea) An S-y	21	21
SWM	(South Korea) Kim G-e	11	10

==== Section 2 ====
First round
3	(Japan) A Yamaguchi	21	21
(Chinese Taipei) Huang Y-h	11	14
(South Korea) Sim Y-j	21	21
(Chinese Taipei) Sung S-y	9	13
8	(Thailand) P Chochuwong	14	15
(Chinese Taipei) Chiu P-c	21	21
(Thailand) S Katethong	21	21
(Malaysia) Wong L C	14	14

Second round
3	(Japan) A Yamaguchi	21	21
(South Korea) Sim Y-j	15	16
(Chinese Taipei) Chiu P-c	27	15
(Thailand) S Katethong	29	21

Quarter-finals
3	(Japan) A Yamaguchi	21	21
(Thailand) S Katethong	18	16

=== Bottom half ===
==== Section 3 ====
First round
(India) T Sharma	21	21
(Denmark) A Schulz	16	17
(Japan) H Akechi	21	17	19
SWM	(Japan) T Miyazaki	19	21	21
(India) D Sihag	18	15
(Bulgaria) K Nalbantova	21	21
(Chinese Taipei) Tung C-t	16	14
6	(Thailand) R Intanon	21	21

Second round
(India) T Sharma	17	21	16
SWM	(Japan) T Miyazaki	21	18	21
(Bulgaria) K Nalbantova	22	21
6	(Thailand) R Intanon	20	17

Quarter-finals
SWM	(Japan) T Miyazaki	21	21
(Bulgaria) K Nalbantova	12	11

==== Section 4 ====
First round
(Canada) M Li	21	21
PFR	(Germany) Y Li	13	15
(Japan) N Nidaira	15	19
SWM	(Japan) N Okuhara	21	21
(Malaysia) Letshanaa K	21	21
PFR	(England) K Feng	6	3
PFR	(Thailand) Tonr Saeheng	6	14
2	(China) Wang ZY	21	21

Second round
(Canada) M Li	18	14
SWM	(Japan) N Okuhara	21	21
(Malaysia) Letshanaa K	10	8
2	(China) Wang ZY	21	21

Quarter-finals
SWM	(Japan) N Okuhara	6	10
2	(China) Wang ZY	21	21

== Men's doubles ==
=== Seeds ===
1. (South Korea) Kim Won-ho / Seo Seung-jae (first round)
2. (Indonesia) Fajar Alfian / Muhammad Shohibul Fikri (withdrew)
3. (China) Liang Weikeng / Wang Chang (withdrew)
4. (India) Satwiksairaj Rankireddy / Chirag Shetty (champions)
5. (Malaysia) Goh Sze Fei / Nur Izzuddin (first round)
6. (Indonesia) Sabar Karyaman Gutama / Muhammad Reza Pahlevi Isfahani (quarter-finals)
7. (England) Ben Lane / Sean Vendy (second round)
8. (Japan) Takuro Hoki / Yugo Kobayashi (first round)

=== Finals ===
Semi-finals
(Malaysia) Tee Kai Wun (Malaysia) Yap Roy King	21	21	17
(China) He Jiting (China) Ren Xiangyu	23	17	21
(Malaysia) Nur Mohd Azriyn Ayub (Malaysia) Tan Wee Kiong	16	21	11
4	(India) Satwiksairaj Rankireddy (India) Chirag Shetty	21	18	21

Final
(China) He Jiting (China) Ren Xiangyu	21	13	17
4	(India) Satwiksairaj Rankireddy (India) Chirag Shetty	11	21	21

=== Top half ===
==== Section 1 ====
First round
1	(South Korea) Kim W-h (South Korea) Seo S-j	19	19
(Indonesia) L R Carnando (Indonesia) D Marthin	21	21
(Japan) T Nomura (Japan) Y Shimogami	21	21
(Chinese Taipei) Chen Z-r (Chinese Taipei) Lin Y-c	12	16
5	(Malaysia) Goh S F (Malaysia) N Izzuddin	16	0^{r}
(Indonesia) A F Rayhan (Indonesia) D A Wahyudi	21	0
PFR	(Chinese Taipei) He Z-w (Chinese Taipei) Huang J-h	21	16	9
(Malaysia) Tee K W (Malaysia) Yap R K	18	21	21

Second round
(Indonesia) L R Carnando (Indonesia) D Marthin	21	16	19
(Japan) T Nomura (Japan) Y Shimogami	14	21	21
(Indonesia) A F Rayhan (Indonesia) D A Wahyudi	16	19
(Malaysia) Tee K W (Malaysia) Yap R K	21	21

Quarter-finals
(Japan) T Nomura (Japan) Y Shimogami	13	21	12
(Malaysia) Tee K W (Malaysia) Yap R K	21	19	21

==== Section 2 ====
First round
8	(Japan) T Hoki (Japan) Y Kobayashi	9^{r}
(China) Hu KY (China) Lin XY	11
(Chinese Taipei) Lee J-h (Chinese Taipei) Yang P-h	12	19
(China) He JT (China) Ren XY	21	21
SWM	(China) Chen BY (China) Liu Y	11
(India) H Amsakarunan (India) Arjun M. R.	8^{r}
(Malaysia) Soh W Y (Malaysia) A Tai	18	21	21
(Japan) H Okamura (Japan) K Yamashita	21	12	15

Second round
(China) Hu KY (China) Lin XY	18	21	19
(China) He JT (China) Ren XY	21	15	21
SWM	(China) Chen BY (China) Liu Y	13	18
(Malaysia) Soh W Y (Malaysia) A Tai	21	21

Quarter-finals
(China) He JT (China) Ren XY	21	17	21
(Malaysia) Soh W Y (Malaysia) A Tai	16	21	16

=== Bottom half ===
==== Section 3 ====
First round
(Japan) K Kumagai (Japan) H Nishi	21	19	20
PFR	(Malaysia) Chia W J (Malaysia) Teo E Y	16	21	22
(Malaysia) N M Azriyn A (Malaysia) Tan W K	14	21	21
SWM	(Malaysia) A Chia (Malaysia) Man W C	21	15	19
(Denmark) D Lundgaard (Denmark) M Vestergaard	19	22	21
(United States) Chen Z-y (United States) P Smith	21	20	10
(South Korea) Kang M-h (South Korea) Ki D-j	18	16
6	(Indonesia) S K Gutama (Indonesia) M R P Isfahani	21	21

Second round
PFR	(Malaysia) Chia W J (Malaysia) Teo E Y	18	21	17
(Malaysia) N M Azriyn A (Malaysia) Tan W K	21	16	21
(Denmark) D Lundgaard (Denmark) M Vestergaard	15	15
6	(Indonesia) S K Gutama (Indonesia) M R P Isfahani	21	21

Quarter-finals
(Malaysia) N M Azriyn A (Malaysia) Tan W K	21	16	21
6	(Indonesia) S K Gutama (Indonesia) M R P Isfahani	17	21	19

==== Section 4 ====
First round
(Denmark) C F Kjær (Denmark) R Kjær	14	21	17
(Denmark) K Astrup (Denmark) A S Rasmussen	21	13	21
(Chinese Taipei) Chiu H-c (Chinese Taipei) Wang C-l	15	17
7	(England) B Lane (England) S Vendy	21	21
(France) C Popov (France) T J Popov	21	21
(Chinese Taipei) Lee F-c (Chinese Taipei) Lee F-j	18	7
(Malaysia) J Arif (Malaysia) Kang K X	11	16
4	(India) S Rankireddy (India) C Shetty	21	21

Second round
(Denmark) K Astrup (Denmark) A S Rasmussen	21	12	21
7	(England) B Lane (England) S Vendy	8	21	11
(France) C Popov (France) T J Popov	17	24	9
4	(India) S Rankireddy (India) C Shetty	21	22	21

Quarter-finals
(Denmark) K Astrup (Denmark) A S Rasmussen	13	21	18
4	(India) S Rankireddy (India) C Shetty	21	16	21

== Women's doubles ==
=== Seeds ===
1. (China) Liu Shengshu / Tan Ning (withdrew)
2. (South Korea) Baek Ha-na / Lee So-hee (withdrew)
3. (Japan) Yuki Fukushima / Mayu Matsumoto (withdrew)
4. (China) Jia Yifan / Zhang Shuxian (semi-finals)
5. (Malaysia) Pearly Tan / Thinaah Muralitharan (second round)
6. (Japan) Rin Iwanaga / Kie Nakanishi (second round)
7. (China) Li Yijing / Luo Xumin (first round)
8. (Bulgaria) Gabriela Stoeva / Stefani Stoeva (withdrew)

=== Finals ===
Semi-finals
4	(China) Jia Yifan (China) Zhang Shuxian	14	13
SWM	(China) Bao Lijing (China) Cao Zihan	21	21
(Japan) Sumire Nakade (Japan) Miyu Takahashi	21	24	21
SWM	(Japan) Ayako Sakuramoto (Japan) Sayaka Hirota	16	26	16

Final
SWM	(China) Bao Lijing (China) Cao Zihan	18	18
(Japan) Sumire Nakade (Japan) Miyu Takahashi	21	21

=== Top half ===
==== Section 1 ====
First round
SWM	(Chinese Taipei) Hsu Y-h (Chinese Taipei) Lin J-y	21	15	21
(Canada) J Dent (Canada) C Lai	18	21	13
(Malaysia) Ong X Y (Malaysia) C Ting	16	15
(Chinese Taipei) Hsu Y-c (Chinese Taipei) Sung Y-h	21	21

Second round
4	(China) Jia YF (China) Zhang SX	21	21
(Malaysia) Low Z Y (Malaysia) N Maisarah	13	16
SWM	(Chinese Taipei) Hsu Y-h (Chinese Taipei) Lin J-y	14	21	21
(Chinese Taipei) Hsu Y-c (Chinese Taipei) Sung Y-h	21	14	14

Quarter-finals
4	(China) Jia YF (China) Zhang SX	21	21
SWM	(Chinese Taipei) Hsu Y-h (Chinese Taipei) Lin J-y	12	11

==== Section 2 ====
First round
SWM	(China) Bao LJ (China) Cao ZH	21	21
(Hong Kong) Yeung N T (Hong Kong) Yeung P L	12	12
(United States) L Lam (United States) A Lee	21	21
(Chinese Taipei) Hu L-f (Chinese Taipei) Jheng Y-c	9	12

Second round
6	(Japan) R Iwanaga (Japan) K Nakanishi	20	15
(United States) F Corbett (United States) J Gai	22	21
SWM	(China) Bao LJ (China) Cao ZH	22	21
(United States) L Lam (United States) A Lee	20	17

Quarter-finals
(United States) F Corbett (United States) J Gai	12	15
SWM	(China) Bao LJ (China) Cao ZH	21	21

=== Bottom half ===
==== Section 3 ====
First round
(Chinese Taipei) Chang C-h (Chinese Taipei) Yang C-t	22	13	16
(Hong Kong) Lui L L (Hong Kong) Tsang H Y	20	21	21
(China) Luo Y (China) Wang TG	21	8	21
SWM	(Japan) R Hirokami (Japan) S Hobara	17	21	5
(Japan) S Nakade (Japan) M Takahashi	13	21	21
7	(China) Li YJ (China) Luo XM	21	17	16

Second round
(Hong Kong) Lui L L (Hong Kong) Tsang H Y	15	16
(China) Luo Y (China) Wang TG	21	21
(Canada) C Choi (Canada) E Kwan	8	7
(Japan) S Nakade (Japan) M Takahashi	21	21

Quarter-finals
(China) Luo Y (China) Wang TG	10	21	23
(Japan) S Nakade (Japan) M Takahashi	21	13	25

==== Section 4 ====
First round
(Chinese Taipei) Lin C-c (Chinese Taipei) Yang C-y	21	17
SWM	(Japan) S Hirota (Japan) A Sakuramoto	23	21
(Japan) K Osawa (Japan) M Tanabe	19	12
(Thailand) B Aimsaard (Thailand) N Aimsaard	21	21

Second round
(Germany) Y Li (United States) I Wang	14	7
SWM	(Japan) A Sakuramoto (Japan) S Hirota	21	21
(Thailand) B Aimsaard (Thailand) N Aimsaard	21	17	21
5	(Malaysia) P Tan (Malaysia) Thinaah M	16	21	19

Quarter-finals
SWM	(Japan) A Sakuramoto (Japan) S Hirota	19	21	21
(Thailand) B Aimsaard (Thailand) N Aimsaard	21	13	18

== Mixed doubles ==
=== Seeds ===
1. (China) Feng Yanzhe / Huang Dongping (champions)
2. (Denmark) Mathias Christiansen / Alexandra Bøje (first round)
3. (China) Jiang Zhenbang / Wei Yaxin (second round)
4. (France) Thom Gicquel / Delphine Delrue (first round)
5. (China) Guo Xinwa / Chen Fanghui (second round)
6. (China) Cheng Xing / Zhang Chi (second round)
7. (Chinese Taipei) Ye Hong-wei / Nicole Gonzales Chan (quarter-finals)
8. (Malaysia) Goh Soon Huat / Shevon Jemie Lai (semi-finals)

=== Finals ===
Semi-finals
1	(China) Feng Yanzhe (China) Huang Dongping	21	24
8	(Malaysia) Goh Soon Huat (Malaysia) Shevon Jemie Lai	11	22
(Malaysia) Hoo Pang Ron (Malaysia) Lai Pei Jing	21	21
(China) Zhu Yijun (China) Li Qian	12	10

Final
1	(China) Feng Yanzhe (China) Huang Dongping	21	21
(Malaysia) Hoo Pang Ron (Malaysia) Lai Pei Jing	19	16

=== Top half ===
==== Section 1 ====
First round
1	(China) Feng YZ (China) Huang DP	21	19	27
(Japan) Y Watanabe (Japan) M Taguchi	9	21	25
(Chinese Taipei) Yang P-h (Chinese Taipei) Hu L-f	21	13	11
(Thailand) Pak Teeraratsakul (Thailand) S Taerattanachai	13	21	21
7	(Chinese Taipei) Ye H-w (Chinese Taipei) N G Chan	6	21	24
(Malaysia) Wong T C (Malaysia) Lim C S	21	12	22
(Chinese Taipei) Wu H-y (Chinese Taipei) Yang C-y	17	15
(United States) P Smith (United States) J Gai	21	21

Second round
1	(China) Feng YZ (China) Huang DP	15	23	21
(Thailand) Pak Teeraratsakul (Thailand) S Taerattanachai	21	21	17
7	(Chinese Taipei) Ye H-w (Chinese Taipei) N G Chan	21	13	21
(United States) P Smith (United States) J Gai	14	21	17

Quarter-finals
1	(China) Feng YZ (China) Huang DP	21	15	21
7	(Chinese Taipei) Ye H-w (Chinese Taipei) N G Chan	10	21	12

==== Section 2 ====
First round
3	(China) Jiang ZB (China) Wei YX	21	21
(Japan) Y Shimogami (Japan) S Hobara	11	15
(China) Gao JX (China) Wu MY	21	21
(France) J Maio (France) L Palermo	14	15
8	(Malaysia) Goh S H (Malaysia) S J Lai	21	21
(United States) Chen Z-y (United States) F Corbett	14	19
(Malaysia) Par T A (Venezuela) J Z Gabriela	14	10
(Japan) A Koga (Japan) N Saito	21	21

Second round
3	(China) Jiang ZB (China) Wei YX	21	18	17
(China) Gao JX (China) Wu MY	15	21	21
8	(Malaysia) Goh S H (Malaysia) S J Lai	21	19	21
(Japan) A Koga (Japan) N Saito	14	21	10

Quarter-finals
(China) Gao JX (China) Wu MY	15	11
8	(Malaysia) Goh S H (Malaysia) S J Lai	21	21

=== Bottom half ===
==== Section 3 ====
First round
(Hong Kong) Chan Y C (Hong Kong) Ng T Y	12	21	11
(Malaysia) Hoo P R (Malaysia) Lai P J	21	16	21
(Canada) J Lai (Canada) C Lai	13	12
6	(China) Cheng X (China) Zhang C	21	21
(Thailand) Tonk Saeheng (Thailand) Tonr Saeheng	8	9
(India) D Kapila (India) T Crasto	21	21
(Chinese Taipei) Liu K-h (Chinese Taipei) Hsu Y-h	23	21
4	(France) T Gicquel (France) D Delrue	21	10

Second round
(Malaysia) Hoo P R (Malaysia) Lai P J	24	21
6	(China) Cheng X (China) Zhang C	22	19
(India) D Kapila (India) T Crasto	18	18
(Chinese Taipei) Liu K-h (Chinese Taipei) Hsu Y-h	21	21

Quarter-finals
(Malaysia) Hoo P R (Malaysia) Lai P J	24	21
(Chinese Taipei) Liu K-h (Chinese Taipei) Hsu Y-h	22	5

==== Section 4 ====
First round
PFR	(England) Zhang JQ (England) K Feng	5	3
(China) Zhu YJ (China) Li Q	21	21
(Malaysia) Chen T J (Malaysia) Cheng S Y	14	19
5	(China) Guo XW (China) Chen FH	21	21
(Chinese Taipei) Wu G-x (Chinese Taipei) Lee C-h	21	21
(India) R Kapoor (India) R Gadde	16	18
(Germany) M Seidel (Germany) T P Nguyen	15	21	21
2	(Denmark) M Christiansen (Denmark) A Bøje	21	13	13

Second round
(China) Zhu YJ (China) Li Q	21	23
5	(China) Guo XW (China) Chen FH	10	21
(Chinese Taipei) Wu G-x (Chinese Taipei) Lee C-h	21	21	21
(Germany) M Seidel (Germany) T P Nguyen	23	11	9

Quarter-finals
(China) Zhu YJ (China) Li Q	24	21
(Chinese Taipei) Wu G-x (Chinese Taipei) Lee C-h	22	12

Preceded by 2026 Korea Masters	BWF World Tour; 2026 BWF season	Succeeded by 2026 Vietnam Open
