= Badminton at the 2025 Summer World University Games – Women's doubles =

Women's doubles at the 2025 Summer World University Games
- Venue: Westenergie Sporthalle
- Location: Mülheim, Germany
- Dates: 22–26 July 2025
- Competitors: 88 from 26 nations

Medalists
gold medal	Li Qian (CHN); Wang Yiduo (CHN)
silver medal	Jheng Yu-chieh (TPE); Sung Yu-hsuan (TPE)
bronze medal	Sumire Nakade (JPN); Yumi Tanabe (JPN)
bronze medal	Liu Jiayue (CHN); Tang Ruizhi (CHN)

The women's doubles badminton event at the 2025 Summer World University Games was held from 22 to 26 July at the Westenergie Sporthalle in Mülheim, Germany. A total of 88 competitors from 26 nations participated in the event.

== Draw ==
The draw published on 21 July 2025.

=== Finals ===
Semifinals
Sumire Nakade (JPN); Yumi Tanabe (JPN)	9	7
Jheng Yu-chieh (TPE); Sung Yu-hsuan (TPE)	15	15
Liu Jiayue (CHN); Tang Ruizhi (CHN)	8	15	9
Li Qian (CHN); Wang Yiduo (CHN)	15	6	15

Final
Jheng Yu-chieh (TPE); Sung Yu-hsuan (TPE)	8	15	9
Li Qian (CHN); Wang Yiduo (CHN)	15	7	15

=== Top half ===
==== Section 1 ====
First round
V Gobi (MAS); C San (MAS)	11	17
S Nakade (JPN); Y Tanabe (JPN)	15	19
Huang C-p (TPE); Wang P-y (TPE)	15	15
P Choden (BHU); K Wangmo (BHU)	2	3

Second round
V Khadkekar (IND); A Khan (IND)	11	8
Y Bektaş (TUR); T Korkmaz (TUR)	15	15
A Khomich (POL); U Volskaya (POL)	7	10
S Nakade (JPN); Y Tanabe (JPN)	15	15
Hsu Y-h (TPE); Yang C-y (TPE)	15	15
A Ramírez (ESP); A Torralba (ESP)	5	3
S Go (AUS); YL Zhang (AUS)	8	9
Huang C-p (TPE); Wang P-y (TPE)	15	15

Third round
Y Bektaş (TUR); T Korkmaz (TUR)	8	12
S Nakade (JPN); Y Tanabe (JPN)	15	15
Hsu Y-h (TPE); Yang C-y (TPE)	15	15
Huang C-p (TPE); Wang P-y (TPE)	5	11

Quarterfinals
S Nakade (JPN); Y Tanabe (JPN)	15	15
Hsu Y-h (TPE); Yang C-y (TPE)	5	13

==== Section 2 ====
First round
A Alymova (UKR); S Lavrova (UKR)	11	15
A Imaizumi (JPN); Y Kobayashi (JPN)	15	17
S Danial (SGP); J Wu (SGP)	4	5
Lee X J (MAS); Low Y Y (MAS)	15	15
E Lin (USA); K Ngo (USA)	15	15
K Ea (AUS); P Kustiadi (AUS)	11	8

Second round
L Michalski (GER); T P Nguyen (GER)	15	15
J Abdelkader (EGY); K Rabie (EGY)	6	3
F M Rafi (UGA); K Nalumansi (UGA)	6	6
A Imaizumi (JPN); Y Kobayashi (JPN)	15	15
Jheng Y-c (TPE); Sung Y-h (TPE)	11	15	15
Lee X J (MAS); Low Y Y (MAS)	15	6	8
Kim C-j (KOR); Lee H-w (KOR)	15	15
E Lin (USA); K Ngo (USA)	5	9

Third round
L Michalski (GER); T P Nguyen (GER)	15	4	13
A Imaizumi (JPN); Y Kobayashi (JPN)	13	15	15
Jheng Y-c (TPE); Sung Y-h (TPE)	15	15
Kim C-j (KOR); Lee H-w (KOR)	2	12

Quarterfinals
A Imaizumi (JPN); Y Kobayashi (JPN)	9	11
Jheng Y-c (TPE); Sung Y-h (TPE)	15	15

=== Bottom half ===
==== Section 3 ====
First round
R Cloteaux-Foucault (FRA); F Vallet (FRA)	15	15
Ieong S K (MAC); Wang W K (MAC)	3	10
L Chaiwan (THA); T Kleebyeesun (THA)	11	21	10
Liu JY (CHN); Tang RZ (CHN)	15	19	15
A Bhatt (IND); D Sihag (IND)	15	0
A Nepal (NEP); N Subba (NEP)	3	0^{r}

Second round
R Cloteaux-Foucault (FRA); F Vallet (FRA)	12	4
M Hirose (JPN); S Nakahara (JPN)	15	15
Liu JY (CHN); Tang RZ (CHN)	15	15
Leung S L (HKG); Leung Y Y (HKG)	7	5
A Bhatt (IND); D Sihag (IND)	15	15
C Chan (SGP); D Choo (SGP)	5	8
J Piwowar (POL); D Zimnol (POL)	16	15
D Odijk (NED); I van Leijsen (NED)	18	17

Third round
M Hirose (JPN); S Nakahara (JPN)	15	3	11
Liu JY (CHN); Tang RZ (CHN)	9	15	15
A Bhatt (IND); D Sihag (IND)	15	15
D Odijk (NED); I van Leijsen (NED)	5	11

Quarterfinals
Liu JY (CHN); Tang RZ (CHN)	15	17
A Bhatt (IND); D Sihag (IND)	11	15

==== Section 4 ====
First round
A Novoa (ESP); C Teruel (ESP)	9	2
Kim Y-j (KOR); Lee C-e (KOR)	15	15
F Kiss (HUN); H Szűcs (HUN)	2	5
K Chou (USA); X Huang (USA)	15	15

Second round
Kim Y-j (KOR); Lee C-e (KOR)	15	15
R Shah (CAN); A Yu (CAN)	5	10
S Nong (CAN); E Zhang (CAN)	5	5
Li Q (CHN); Wang YD (CHN)	15	15
K Chou (USA); X Huang (USA)	9	5
A Povanon (THA); P Srisawat (THA)	15	15
S Lee (SGP); G Tan (SGP)	9	6
N Carulla (ESP); C Jiménez (ESP)	15	15

Third round
Kim Y-j (KOR); Lee C-e (KOR)	15	11	9
Li Q (CHN); Wang YD (CHN)	11	15	15
A Povanon (THA); P Srisawat (THA)	15	15
N Carulla (ESP); C Jiménez (ESP)	6	10

Quarterfinals
Li Q (CHN); Wang YD (CHN)	15	10	15
A Povanon (THA); P Srisawat (THA)	13	15	6
