= Sumire Nakade =

Japanese badminton player (born 2004)

Personal information
- Native name: 中出 すみれ
- Born: 28 February 2004 (age 22) Himi, Toyama Prefecture, Japan
- Height: 1.66 m (5 ft 5 in)

Sport
- Country: Japan
- Sport: Badminton
- Handedness: Right
- Coached by: Hiroyuki Endo

Women's doubles
- Career record: 36 wins, 5 losses (87.80%)
- Highest ranking: 11 (with Miyu Takahashi, 27 October 2026)
- Current ranking: 11 (with Miyu Takahashi, 17 November 2026)
- BWF profile
Medal record
Women's badminton
Representing Japan
World University Games
Bronze medal – third place	2025 Mülheim	Women's doubles

Sumire Nakade (中出 すみれ, Nakade Sumire; born 28 February 2004) is a Japanese badminton player who competes in doubles events. A member of the Japanese national team, she plays for the BIPROGY badminton team and has reached a career-high women's doubles world ranking of No. 11. A graduate of Ryukoku University, she won a bronze medal in women's doubles at the 2025 World University Games.

In 2026, she partnered with Miyu Takahashi to win five BWF World Tour titles, including the Super 750 China Masters and Super 300 titles at the Orléans Masters, U.S. Open, and Taipei Open.

== Early life and career ==
Nakade was born in Toyama Prefecture and began playing badminton at the age of six. She attended Takaoka Seibu Junior High School and then Toyama University of International Studies Affiliated High School, before enrolling in the Faculty of Law (Sports Science Course) at Ryukoku University.

During her collegiate career, Nakade won the women's doubles titles at the All Japan Inter-Collegiate Championships in 2023 and 2025, as well as the All Japan Student Mixed Doubles Championship in 2024.

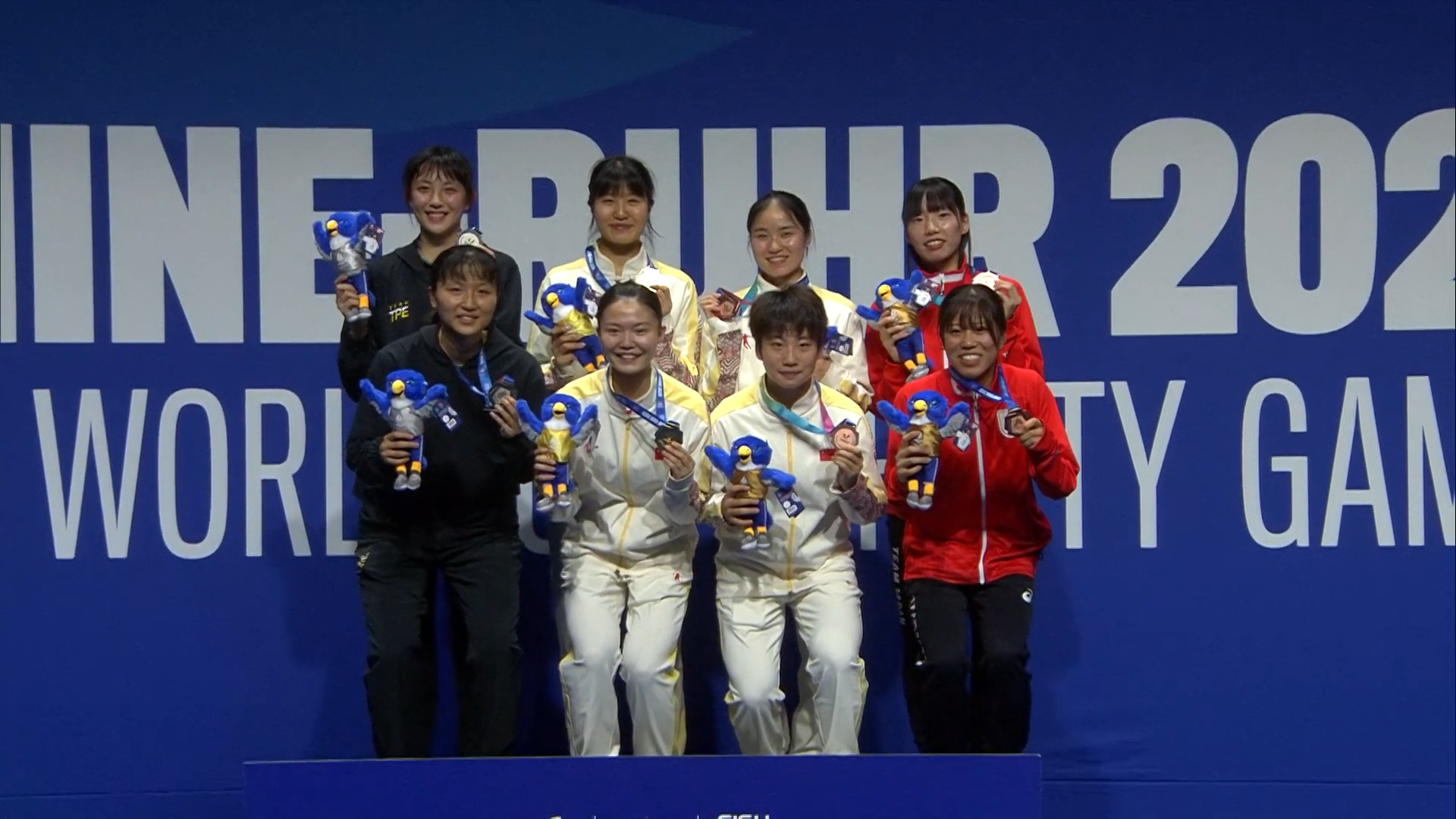
Nakade (back right) on the podium at the 2025 World University Games.

Nakade made her international debut representing Japan at the 2025 World University Games in Mülheim, Germany. Competing in women's doubles with Yumi Tanabe, the pair secured a bronze medal.

Following her university graduation, Nakade joined the BIPROGY badminton team. In her debut professional season, she was named the Women's Rookie of the Year award at the 2025 Japan Badminton S/J League.

== Career ==
=== 2026: Five World Tour titles ===
Nakade and Takahashi during the prize presentation at the 2026 China Masters.

In 2026, Nakade formed a new partnership with Miyu Takahashi. Competing together for the first time, they won the Super 300 Orléans Masters, defeating Lin Chih-chun and Yang Chu-yun in the final to secure Nakade's maiden BWF World Tour title. This tournament marked Nakade's first appearance at both a World Tour event and an international Open, as her previous international experience was limited to the World University Games. They secured two more consecutive titles shortly afterwards: the Super 100 Baoji China Masters, where they defeated the Malaysian pair Low Zi Yu and Noraqilah Maisarah, and the Super 300 U.S. Open, where they once again defeated Lin and Yang in the final. In August, they claimed their fourth title at the Super 300 Taipei Open by defeating the top-seeded Malaysian pair, Pearly Tan and Thinaah Muralitharan.

In September, Nakade made her Super 750 debut at the China Masters, where she and Takahashi defeated China's Bao Lijing and Cao Zihan in the final to win their first Super 750 title. En route to the title, they defeated 2026 World Championships bronze medallists Li Yijing and Luo Xumin in the first round. They also became the first unseeded women's doubles champions at the tournament since Bao Yixin and Yu Xiaohan in 2017. In October, Nakade and Takahashi reached the semifinals of the Denmark Open, where they lost to compatriots Hinata Suzuki and Nao Yamakita. One month later, Nakade and Takahashi got to the final of Hong Kong Open but lost against Malaysian's Pearly Tan and Thinaah Muralitharan in straight games.

== Playing style ==
At the 2026 China Masters, commentators Gillian Clark and Steen Pedersen observed Nakade's interceptions and sharp shots from the midcourt and forecourt, noting her speed and anticipation at the front of the court. They characterised her play in these areas as aggressive, emphasising her movement and pursuit of attacking opportunities rather than the power of her shots. In the final, the same commentators highlighted her ability to intercept shots at the net, rapid movement, willingness to take risks, and proactive play in the forecourt.

== Achievements ==
=== World University Games ===
Women's doubles
Year	Venue	Partner	Opponent	Score	Result	Ref.
2025	Westenergie Sporthalle; Mülheim, Germany	(Japan) Yumi Tanabe	(Chinese Taipei) Jheng Yu-chieh (Chinese Taipei) Sung Yu-hsuan	9–15, 7–15	Bronze	

=== BWF World Tour (5 titles, 1 runner-up) ===
The BWF World Tour, which was announced on 19 March 2017 and implemented in 2018, is a series of elite badminton tournaments sanctioned by the Badminton World Federation (BWF). The BWF World Tour is divided into levels of World Tour Finals, Super 1000, Super 750, Super 500, Super 300, and the BWF Tour Super 100.

Women's doubles
Year	Tournament	Level	Partner	Opponent	Score	Result	Ref.
2026	Orléans Masters	Super 300	(Japan) Miyu Takahashi	(Chinese Taipei) Lin Chih-chun (Chinese Taipei) Yang Chu-yun	22–20, 12–21, 21–18	(gold) Winner	
2026	Baoji China Masters	Super 100	(Japan) Miyu Takahashi	(Malaysia) Low Zi Yu (Malaysia) Noraqilah Maisarah	21–13, 21–17	(gold) Winner	
2026	U.S. Open	Super 300	(Japan) Miyu Takahashi	(Chinese Taipei) Lin Chih-chun (Chinese Taipei) Yang Chu-yun	21–16, 21–10	(gold) Winner	
2026	Taipei Open	Super 300	(Japan) Miyu Takahashi	(Malaysia) Pearly Tan (Malaysia) Thinaah Muralitharan	21–16, 21–18	(gold) Winner	
2026	China Masters	Super 750	(Japan) Miyu Takahashi	(China) Bao Lijing (China) Cao Zihan	21–18, 21–18	(gold) Winner	
2026	Hong Kong Open	Super 500	(Japan) Miyu Takahashi	(Malaysia) Pearly Tan (Malaysia) Thinaah Muralitharan	20–22, 16–21	(silver) Runner-up	

== Performance timeline ==
Key

W	Won	F	Finalist	SF	Semi-finalist
QF	Quarter-finalist	#R	Rounds 4, 3, 2, 1	RR	Round-robin stage
Q#	Qualification round	A	Absent	w/d	Withdrew
G	Gold	S	Silver	B	Bronze
NH	Not held	N/A	Not applicable	DNQ	Did not qualify

=== National team ===
Team events	2025	Ref.
World University Games	5th	

=== Individual competitions ===
==== Women's doubles ====
Events	2025	Ref.
World University Games	B	

Tournament	BWF World Tour	Best	Ref.
Tournament	2026	Best	Ref.
Orléans Masters	W	W ('26)	
Baoji China Masters	W	W ('26)	
U.S. Open	W	W ('26)	
Canada Open	1R	1R ('26)	
Taipei Open	W	W ('26)	
Korea Masters	QF	QF ('26)	
China Masters	W	W ('26)	
Arctic Open	2R	2R ('26)	
Denmark Open	SF	SF ('26)	
French Open	2R	2R ('26)	
Japan Masters	2R	2R ('26)	
Hong Kong Open	F	F ('26)	
Year-end ranking			
Tournament	2026	Best	Ref.

==== Mixed doubles ====
Tournament	BWF World Tour	Best	Ref.
Tournament	2026	Best	Ref.
Korea Masters	1R	1R ('26)	
Year-end ranking			
Tournament	2026	Best	Ref.

== Wins over top-10 ranked pairs ==
Wins over pairs who were ranked in the world's top 10 at the time the match was played.

#	Partner	Opponent	Rk	Tournament	Rd	Score	Rk	Ref.
1	(Japan) Miyu Takahashi	(Chinese Taipei) Hsieh Pei-shan (Chinese Taipei) Hung En-tzu	10	2026 Taipei Open	2R	21–17, 22–20	71	
2	(Japan) Miyu Takahashi	(Malaysia) Pearly Tan (Malaysia) Thinaah Muralitharan	5	2026 Taipei Open	F	21–16, 21–18	71	
3	(Japan) Miyu Takahashi	(China) Li Yijing (China) Luo Xumin	8	2026 China Masters	1R	13–21, 21–17, 21–16	42	
4	(Japan) Miyu Takahashi	(Bulgaria) Gabriela Stoeva (Bulgaria) Stefani Stoeva	9	2026 Hong Kong Open	2R	15–21, 21–18, 21–18	11	
6	(Japan) Miyu Takahashi	(Japan) Rin Iwanaga (Japan) Kie Nakanishi	5	2026 Hong Kong Open	QF	21–19, 22–20	11	

== Record against selected opponents ==
Record against year-end Finals finalists, World Championships semi-finalists, and Olympic quarter-finalists. Accurate as of 5 September 2026.

=== Miyu Takahashi ===
Players	M	W	L	Diff.
(China) Li Yijing & Luo Xumin	1	1	0	+1
(India) Gayatri Gopichand & Treesa Jolly	1	1	0	+1
(Malaysia) Pearly Tan & Thinaah Muralitharan	1	1	0	+1
