= Badminton at the 2025 Summer World University Games – Mixed team =

Mixed team at the 2025 Summer World University Games
- Venue: Westenergie Sporthalle
- Location: Mülheim, Germany
- Dates: 17–20 July 2025
- Competitors: 195 from 21 nations

Medalists
gold medal	China (CHN)
silver medal	Chinese Taipei (TPE)
bronze medal	India (IND)
bronze medal	South Korea (KOR)

The mixed team badminton event at the 2025 Summer World University Games was held from 17 to 20 July at the Westenergie Sporthalle in Mülheim, Germany. A total of 195 competitors from 21 nations participated in the event.

China won the gold medal after defeating Chinese Taipei 3–1 in the final. The bronze medals were awarded to the losing semi-finalists, India and South Korea.

== Group composition ==
Group A	Group B	Group C	Group D	Group E	Group F	Group G	Group H
China; Spain	Thailand; Australia; Azerbaijan	France; United States; Hungary	Malaysia; Canada	South Korea; Singapore; Ukraine	India; Hong Kong; Macau	Japan; Poland; Netherlands	Chinese Taipei; Germany

== Group A ==
Pos	Team	Pld	W	L	MF	MA	MD	GF	GA	GD	PF	PA	PD	Pts	Qualification	People's Republic of China	Spain
1	China	1	1	0	5	0	+5	10	1	+9	159	97	+62	1	Advance to the knockout stage	—	5–0
2	Spain	1	0	1	0	5	−5	1	10	−9	97	159	−62	0	Advance to the knockout stage		—

Source: rhineruhr2025.com

=== China vs Spain ===
China
5
Westenergie Sporthalle Court 1
18 July 2025, 09:00 UTC+2

Spain
0

			1	2	3
1	(China) (Spain)	Cui Hechen / Peng Jianqin; Daniel Franco / Carlos Piris	15; 11	9; 15	15; 13
2	(China) (Spain)	Yuan Anqi; Cristina Teruel	15; 2	15; 6
3	(China) (Spain)	Wang Zijun; Álvaro Leal	15; 7	15; 10
4	(China) (Spain)	Liu Jiayue / Tang Ruizhi; Nikol Carulla / Carmen Jiménez	15; 11	15; 7
5	(China) (Spain)	Liao Pinyi / Li Qian; Vicente Gázquez / Amaia Torralba	15; 8	15; 7

== Group B ==
Pos	Team	Pld	W	L	MF	MA	MD	GF	GA	GD	PF	PA	PD	Pts	Qualification	Thailand	Australia	Azerbaijan
1	Thailand	2	2	0	10	0	+10	20	1	+19	317	147	+170	2	Advance to the knockout stage	—	5–0	5–0
2	Australia	2	1	1	5	5	0	11	11	0	265	253	+12	1	Advance to the knockout stage		—	5–0
3	Azerbaijan	2	0	2	0	10	−10	1	20	−19	128	310	−182	0	Advance to the 17th–21st place classification			—

Source: rhineruhr2025.com

=== Thailand vs Azerbaijan ===
Thailand
5
Westenergie Sporthalle Court 2
17 July 2025, 09:00 UTC+2

Azerbaijan
0

			1	2	3
1	(Thailand) (Azerbaijan)	Pakkapon Teeraratsakul / Chasinee Korepap; Murad Shabanzade / Nigar Samadova	15; 4	15; 2
2	(Thailand) (Azerbaijan)	Panitchaphon Teeraratsakul; Agil Gabilov	15; 6	15; 5
3	(Thailand) (Azerbaijan)	Tidapron Kleebyeesun; Hajar Nuriyeva	15; 5	15; 2
4	(Thailand) (Azerbaijan)	Narut Saengkham / Apichasit Teerawiwat; Agil Gabilov / Murad Shabanzade	15; 5	15; 4
5	(Thailand) (Azerbaijan)	Atitaya Povanon / Patida Srisawat; Hajar Nuriyeva / Nigar Samadova	15; 5	15; 4

=== Australia vs Azerbaijan ===
Australia
5
Westenergie Sporthalle Court 1
17 July 2025, 16:00 UTC+2

Azerbaijan
0

			1	2	3
1	(Australia) (Azerbaijan)	Jordan Wang / Kaitlyn Ea; Murad Shabanzade / Nigar Samadova	15; 4	15; 5
2	(Australia) (Azerbaijan)	Asher Ooi; Agil Gabilov	15; 8	15; 5
3	(Australia) (Azerbaijan)	Sydney Go; Hajar Nuriyeva	15; 8	10; 15	15; 9
4	(Australia) (Azerbaijan)	Jordan Wang / Otto Zhao; Agil Gabilov / Murad Shabanzade	15; 9	15; 11
5	(Australia) (Azerbaijan)	Kaitlyn Ea / Priska Kustiadi; Hajar Nuriyeva / Nigar Samadova	15; 8	15; 4

=== Thailand vs Australia ===
Thailand
5
Westenergie Sporthalle Court 4
18 July 2025, 09:00 UTC+2

Australia
0

			1	2	3
1	(Thailand) (Australia)	Peeratchai Sukphun / Pakkapon Teeraratsakul; Jordan Wang / Otto Zhao	15; 5	15; 8
2	(Thailand) (Australia)	Thamonwan Nithiittikrai; Yuelin Zhang	15; 4	15; 9
3	(Thailand) (Australia)	Wongsup Wongsup-In; Asher Ooi	15; 11	14; 16	15; 9
4	(Thailand) (Australia)	Lalinrat Chaiwan / Tidapron Kleebyeesun; Kaitlyn Ea / Sydney Go	15; 12	15; 9
5	(Thailand) (Australia)	Apichasit Teerawiwat / Atitaya Povanon; Otto Zhao / Priska Kustiadi	18; 16	15; 6

== Group C ==
Pos	Team	Pld	W	L	MF	MA	MD	GF	GA	GD	PF	PA	PD	Pts	Qualification	United States	France	Hungary
1	United States	2	1	1	5	5	0	11	11	0	265	253	+12	1	Advance to the knockout stage	—		5–0
2	France	2	2	0	10	0	+10	20	1	+19	317	147	+170	2	Advance to the knockout stage	2–3	—	5–0
3	Hungary	2	0	2	0	10	−10	1	20	−19	128	310	−182	0	Advance to the 17th–21st place classification			—

Source: rhineruhr2025.com

=== France vs Hungary ===
France
5
Westenergie Sporthalle Court 1
17 July 2025, 09:00 UTC+2

Hungary
0

			1	2	3
1	(France) (Hungary)	Maël Cattoen / Flavie Vallet; Barnabás Tóth / Fanni Kiss	15; 6	15; 6
2	(France) (Hungary)	Enogat Roy; Bálint Pápai	15; 4	15; 5
3	(France) (Hungary)	Romane Cloteaux-Foucault; Tünde Takács	14; 16	15; 4	15; 4
4	(France) (Hungary)	Natan Begga / Baptiste Labarthe; Zsombor Dúlcz / Bene Kiss	15; 9	15; 8
5	(France) (Hungary)	Romane Cloteaux-Foucault / Flavie Vallet; Fanni Kiss / Hella Szűcs	15; 5	15; 3

=== United States vs Hungary ===
United States
5
Westenergie Sporthalle Court 2
17 July 2025, 16:00 UTC+2

Hungary
0

			1	2	3
1	(United States) (Hungary)	Ella Lin; Tünde Takács	15; 4	15; 4
2	(United States) (Hungary)	Ryan Ma; Balázs Pápai	15; 13	15; 7
3	(United States) (Hungary)	Koyu Chou / Xin Huang; Fanni Kiss / Hella Szűcs	15; 6	15; 7
4	(United States) (Hungary)	Andre Chim / Andrew Yuan; Bene Kiss / Bálint Pápai	15; 7	15; 11
5	(United States) (Hungary)	Arthur Lee / Katelin Ngo; Barnabás Tóth / Fanni Kiss	15; 6	15; 10

=== France vs United States ===
France
2
Westenergie Sporthalle Court 2
18 July 2025, 09:00 UTC+2

United States
3

			1	2	3
1	(France) (United States)	Maël Cattoen / Flavie Vallet; Arthur Lee / Katelin Ngo	13; 15	15; 10	20; 21
2	(France) (United States)	Enogat Roy; Kelvin Chong	15; 8	15; 4
3	(France) (United States)	Romane Cloteaux-Foucault; Natalie Chi	11; 15	9; 15
4	(France) (United States)	Maël Cattoen / Lucas Renoir; Andre Chim / Andrew Yuan	15; 12	12; 15	15; 6
5	(France) (United States)	Romane Cloteaux-Foucault / Flavie Vallet; Koyu Chou / Xin Huang	14; 16	12; 15

== Group D ==
Pos	Team	Pld	W	L	MF	MA	MD	GF	GA	GD	PF	PA	PD	Pts	Qualification	Malaysia	Canada
1	Malaysia	1	1	0	4	1	+3	8	3	+5	146	111	+35	1	Advance to the knockout stage	—	4–1
2	Canada	1	0	1	1	4	−3	3	8	−5	111	146	−35	0	Advance to the knockout stage		—

Source: rhineruhr2025.com

=== Malaysia vs Canada ===
Malaysia
4
Westenergie Sporthalle Court 3
18 July 2025, 09:00 UTC+2

Canada
1

			1	2	3
1	(Malaysia) (Canada)	Bryan Goonting / Fazriq Razif; Nathan Mills / Harold Tan	15; 10	15; 5
2	(Malaysia) (Canada)	Wong Ling Ching; Alena Yu	15; 10	15; 8
3	(Malaysia) (Canada)	Kok Jing Hong; Victor Lai	6; 15	15; 8	15; 12
4	(Malaysia) (Canada)	Lee Xin Jie / Low Yeen Yuan; Sophia Nong / Eliana Zhang	15; 3	15; 10
5	(Malaysia) (Canada)	Liew Xun / Vannee Gobi; Timothy Lock / Chloe Hoang	11; 15	9; 15

== Group E ==
Pos	Team	Pld	W	L	MF	MA	MD	GF	GA	GD	PF	PA	PD	Pts	Qualification	South Korea	Ukraine	Singapore
1	South Korea	2	2	0	10	0	+10	20	0	+20	300	119	+181	2	Advance to the knockout stage	—	5–0	5–0
2	Ukraine	2	1	1	4	6	−2	8	14	−6	212	278	−66	1	Advance to the knockout stage		—	
3	Singapore	2	0	2	1	9	−8	4	18	−14	189	304	−115	0	Advance to the 17th–21st place classification		1–4	—

Source: rhineruhr2025.com

=== South Korea vs Ukraine ===
South Korea
5
Westenergie Sporthalle Court 3
17 July 2025, 12:30 UTC+2

Ukraine
0

			1	2	3
1	(South Korea) (Ukraine)	Jin Yong / Kim Yun-ju; Dmytro Shcherbatiuk / Sofiia Lavrova	15; 9	15; 5
2	(South Korea) (Ukraine)	Park Si-hyun; Vitaliy Reva	15; 5	15; 4
3	(South Korea) (Ukraine)	Lee So-yul; Anastasiia Alymova	15; 7	15; 4
4	(South Korea) (Ukraine)	Kang Geon-hui / Park Seung-min; Vitaliy Reva / Dmytro Shcherbatiuk	15; 7	15; 4
5	(South Korea) (Ukraine)	Kim Chae-jung / Lee Hye-won; Anastasiia Alymova / Sofiia Lavrova	15; 7	15; 6

=== Singapore vs Ukraine ===
Singapore
1
Westenergie Sporthalle Court 2
17 July 2025, 19:30 UTC+2

Ukraine
4

			1	2	3
1	(Singapore) (Ukraine)	Darrion Ng / Sabrina Lee; Vitaliy Reva / Anastasiia Alymova	10; 15	10; 15
2	(Singapore) (Ukraine)	Timothy Phang; Dmytro Shcherbatiuk	15; 7	6; 15	9; 15
3	(Singapore) (Ukraine)	Sharifah Danial; Sofiia Lavrova	7; 15	7; 15
4	(Singapore) (Ukraine)	Darrion Ng / Justyn Sim; Vitaliy Reva / Dmytro Shcherbatiuk	15; 7	15; 8
5	(Singapore) (Ukraine)	Sabrina Lee / Grace Tan; Anastasiia Alymova / Sofiia Lavrova	15; 12	10; 15	9; 15

=== South Korea vs Singapore ===
South Korea
5
Westenergie Sporthalle Court 2
18 July 2025, 12:30 UTC+2

Singapore
0

			1	2	3
1	(South Korea) (Singapore)	Jin Yong / Park Seung-min; Darrion Ng / Justyn Sim	15; 6	15; 5
2	(South Korea) (Singapore)	Choi Hyo-won; Joanna Wu	15; 7	15; 2
3	(South Korea) (Singapore)	Choi Ji-hoon; Melcom Lim	15; 13	15; 11
4	(South Korea) (Singapore)	Kim Yun-ju / Lee Chae-eun; Chloe Chan / Desiree Choo	15; 2	15; 4
5	(South Korea) (Singapore)	Lee Jong-min / Lee Hye-won; Sim Jie Bin / Grace Tan	15; 6	15; 5

== Group F ==
Pos	Team	Pld	W	L	MF	MA	MD	GF	GA	GD	PF	PA	PD	Pts	Qualification	Hong Kong	India	Macau
1	Hong Kong	2	2	0	8	2	+6	16	5	+11	287	215	+72	2	Advance to the knockout stage	—		5–0
2	India	2	1	1	7	3	+4	15	6	+9	283	230	+53	1	Advance to the knockout stage	2–3	—	5–0
3	Macau	2	0	2	0	10	−10	0	20	−20	178	303	−125	0	Advance to the 17th–21st place classification			—

Source: rhineruhr2025.com

=== India vs Macau ===
India
5
Westenergie Sporthalle Court 1
17 July 2025, 12:30 UTC+2

Macau
0

			1	2	3
1	(India) (Macau)	Saneeth Dayanand / Sathish Karunakaran; Pui Chi Chon / Vong Kok Weng	15; 13	16; 14
2	(India) (Macau)	Devika Sihag; Pui Chi Wa	15; 7	15; 13
3	(India) (Macau)	Saneeth Dayanand; Ao Fei Long	15; 4	15; 4
4	(India) (Macau)	Tasnim Mir / Varshini Viswanath Sri; Ieong Sam Kio / Wang Wai Kei	15; 12	15; 9
5	(India) (Macau)	Sathish Karunakaran / Vaishnavi Khadkekar; Vong Kok Weng / Pui Chi Wa	15; 9	15; 10

=== Hong Kong vs Macau ===
Hong Kong
5
Westenergie Sporthalle Court 3
17 July 2025, 19:30 UTC+2

Macau
0

			1	2	3
1	(Hong Kong) (Macau)	Ko Shing Hei / Leung Yuet Yee; Pui Chi Chon / Ieong Sam Kio	15; 5	15; 9
2	(Hong Kong) (Macau)	Joshua Wang; Vong Kok Weng	15; 6	15; 9
3	(Hong Kong) (Macau)	Chan Cheuk Lok / Lau Sin Hei; Ao Fei Long / Pui Chi Chon	15; 8	17; 15
4	(Hong Kong) (Macau)	Saloni Mehta; Pui Chi Wa	15; 11	15; 9
5	(Hong Kong) (Macau)	Fu Chi Yan / Leung Sze Lok; Ieong Sam Kio / Wang Wai Kei	15; 8	15; 3

=== India vs Hong Kong ===
India
2
Westenergie Sporthalle Court 3
18 July 2025, 12:30 UTC+2

Hong Kong
3

			1	2	3
1	(India) (Hong Kong)	Saneeth Dayanand; Joshua Wang	15; 8	15; 4
2	(India) (Hong Kong)	Devika Sihag; Saloni Mehta	12; 15	15; 6	7; 15
3	(India) (Hong Kong)	Saneeth Dayanand / Sathish Karunakaran; Ko Shing Hei / Lau Sin Hei	16; 14	15; 13
4	(India) (Hong Kong)	Tasnim Mir / Varshini Viswanath Sri; Leung Sze Lok / Leung Yuet Yee	6; 15	9; 15
5	(India) (Hong Kong)	Sathish Karunakaran / Vaishnavi Khadkekar; Ko Shing Hei / Fu Chi Yan	9; 15	13; 15

== Group G ==
Pos	Team	Pld	W	L	MF	MA	MD	GF	GA	GD	PF	PA	PD	Pts	Qualification	Japan	Netherlands	Poland
1	Japan	2	2	0	10	0	+10	20	0	+20	300	175	+125	2	Advance to the knockout stage	—	5–0	5–0
2	Netherlands	2	1	1	4	6	−2	8	14	−6	244	284	−40	1	Advance to the knockout stage		—	
3	Poland	2	0	2	1	9	−8	4	18	−14	223	308	−85	0	Advance to the 17th–21st place classification		1–4	—

Source: rhineruhr2025.com

=== Japan vs Netherlands ===
Japan
5
Westenergie Sporthalle Court 2
17 July 2025, 12:30 UTC+2

Netherlands
0

			1	2	3
1	(Japan) (Netherlands)	Kazuya Minamoto / Osuke Sakurai; Ties van der Lecq / Brian Wassink	15; 11	15; 7
2	(Japan) (Netherlands)	Asuka Imaizumi; Amy Tan	15; 9	15; 11
3	(Japan) (Netherlands)	Rei Miyashita; Lars Kros	15; 8	15; 8
4	(Japan) (Netherlands)	Mirai Hirose / Suzu Nakahara; Diede Odijk / Amy Tan	15; 8	15; 4
5	(Japan) (Netherlands)	Tsubasa Yoshida / Sumire Nakade; Brian Wassink / Iris van Leijsen	15; 12	15; 8

=== Poland vs Netherlands ===
Poland
1
Westenergie Sporthalle Court 1
17 July 2025, 19:30 UTC+2

Netherlands
4

			1	2	3
1	(Poland) (Netherlands)	Łukasz Cimosz / Anastasia Khomich; Ties van der Lecq / Iris van Leijsen	8; 15	6; 15
2	(Poland) (Netherlands)	Ulyana Volskaya; Amy Tan	15; 9	9; 15	11; 15
3	(Poland) (Netherlands)	Łukasz Cimosz; Lars Kros	13; 15	15; 11	8; 15
4	(Poland) (Netherlands)	Anastasia Khomich / Daria Zimnol; Diede Odijk / Iris van Leijsen	15; 9	15; 9
5	(Poland) (Netherlands)	Bartłomiej Butkus / Jan Wilczak; Ties van der Lecq / Brian Wassink	13; 15	6; 15

=== Japan vs Poland ===
Japan
5
Westenergie Sporthalle Court 4
18 July 2025, 12:30 UTC+2

Poland
0

			1	2	3
1	(Japan) (Poland)	Shiina Sato / Tsubasa Yoshida; Bartłomiej Butkus / Jan Wilczak	15; 5	15; 9
2	(Japan) (Poland)	Yuka Kobayashi; Ulyana Volskaya	15; 11	15; 9
3	(Japan) (Poland)	Kosuke Masumoto; Łukasz Cimosz	15; 7	15; 9
4	(Japan) (Poland)	Sumire Nakade / Yumi Tanabe; Anastasia Khomich / Daria Zimnol	15; 11	15; 9
5	(Japan) (Poland)	Rei Miyashita / Mirai Hirose; Bartłomiej Butkus / Julia Piwowar	15; 9	15; 10

== Group H ==
Pos	Team	Pld	W	L	MF	MA	MD	GF	GA	GD	PF	PA	PD	Pts	Qualification	Chinese Taipei for Universiade	Germany
1	Chinese Taipei	1	1	0	3	2	+1	6	5	+1	147	140	+7	1	Advance to the knockout stage	—	3–2
2	Germany	1	0	1	2	3	−1	5	6	−1	140	147	−7	0	Advance to the knockout stage		—

Source: rhineruhr2025.com

=== Chinese Taipei vs Germany ===
Chinese Taipei
3
Westenergie Sporthalle Court 1
18 July 2025, 12:30 UTC+2

Germany
2

			1	2	3
1	(Chinese Taipei) (Germany)	Chen Cheng-kuan / Hsu Yin-hui; Malik Bourakkadi / Leona Michalski	11; 15	8; 15
2	(Chinese Taipei) (Germany)	Su Li-yang; Matthias Kicklitz	12; 15	13; 15
3	(Chinese Taipei) (Germany)	Chen Zhi-ray / Lin Yu-chieh; Jonathan Dresp / Simon Krax	15; 9	10; 15	18; 16
4	(Chinese Taipei) (Germany)	Wang Pei-yu; Miranda Wilson	15; 6	15; 12
5	(Chinese Taipei) (Germany)	Jheng Yu-chieh / Sung Yu-hsuan; Leona Michalski / Thuc Phuong Nguyen	15; 12	15; 10

== Knockout stage ==
=== Top 16 ===
9th place
H2	Germany	3
A2	Spain	0

9th to 11th places
H2	Germany	3
D2	Canada	1
C1	United States	2
A2	Spain	3

9th to 13th places
H2	Germany	3
G2	Netherlands	0
B2	Australia	0
D2	Canada	3
C1	United States	3
C2	France	2
E2	Ukraine	1
A2	Spain	3

Round 16
A1	China	3
H2	Germany	0
B1	Thailand	3
G2	Netherlands	0
E1	South Korea	3
B2	Australia	0
F1	Hong Kong	3
D2	Canada	1
F2	India	3
C1	United States	1
C2	France	0
D1	Malaysia	3
E2	Ukraine	0
G1	Japan	3
A2	Spain	0
H1	Chinese Taipei	3

Quarterfinals
A1	China	3
B1	Thailand	0
E1	South Korea	3
F1	Hong Kong	0
F2	India	3
D1	Malaysia	2
G1	Japan	1
H1	Chinese Taipei	3

Semifinals
A1	China	3
E1	South Korea	1
F2	India	1
H1	Chinese Taipei	3

Final
A1	China	3
H1	Chinese Taipei	1

==== Round 16 ====
China
3
Westenergie Sporthalle Court 1
18 July 2025 19:30 UTC+2

Germany
0

			1	2	3
1	(China) (Germany)	Liao Pinyi / Li Qian; Malik Bourakkadi / Leona Michalski	15; 10	15; 8
2	(China) (Germany)	Zhou Xinyu; Matthias Kicklitz	15; 7	15; 11
3	(China) (Germany)	Cui Hechen / Peng Jianqin; Jonathan Dresp / Simon Krax	15; 11	16; 14
4	(China) (Germany)	Dai Qinyi; Miranda Wilson				not played
5	(China) (Germany)	Liu Jiayue / Wang Yiduo; Leona Michalski / Thuc Phuong Nguyen				not played

Thailand
3
Westenergie Sporthalle Court 3
18 July 2025 19:30 UTC+2

Netherlands
0

			1	2	3
1	(Thailand) (Netherlands)	Peeratchai Sukphun / Pakkapon Teeraratsakul; Ties van der Lecq / Brian Wassink	15; 10	15; 12
2	(Thailand) (Netherlands)	Lalinrat Chaiwan; Diede Odijk	15; 8	15; 6
3	(Thailand) (Netherlands)	Panitchaphon Teeraratsakul; Lars Kros	15; 10	15; 7
4	(Thailand) (Netherlands)	Chasinee Korepap / Patida Srisawat; Diede Odijk / Iris van Leijsen				not played
5	(Thailand) (Netherlands)	Pakkapon Teeraratsakul / Atitaya Povanon; Brian Wassink / Amy Tan				not played

South Korea
3
Westenergie Sporthalle Court 4
18 July 2025 19:30 UTC+2

Australia
0

			1	2	3
1	(South Korea) (Australia)	Jin Yong / Lee Jong-min; Jordan Wang / Otto Zhao	15; 6	15; 6
2	(South Korea) (Australia)	Lee So-yul; Sydney Go	15; 5	15; 1
3	(South Korea) (Australia)	Choi Ji-hoon; Asher Ooi	15; 12	15; 8
4	(South Korea) (Australia)	Choi Hyo-won / Lee Hye-won; Priska Kustiadi / Yuelin Zhang				not played
5	(South Korea) (Australia)	Jin Yong / Kim Yun-ju; Jordan Wang / Kaitlyn Ea				not played

Hong Kong
3
Westenergie Sporthalle Court 2
18 July 2025 19:30 UTC+2

Canada
1

			1	2	3
1	(Hong Kong) (Canada)	Joshua Wang; Victor Lai	9; 15	15; 13	13; 15
2	(Hong Kong) (Canada)	Saloni Mehta; Eliana Zhang	11; 15	15; 2	16; 14
3	(Hong Kong) (Canada)	Ko Shing Hei / Lau Sin Hei; Victor Lai / Jasper Tang	15; 8	15; 12
4	(Hong Kong) (Canada)	Leung Sze Lok / Leung Yuet Yee; Ritu Shah / Alena Yu	15; 5	15; 6
5	(Hong Kong) (Canada)	Ko Shing Hei / Fu Chi Yan; Timothy Lock / Chloe Hoang				not played

India
3
Westenergie Sporthalle Court 3
19 July 2025 09:00 UTC+2

United States
1

			1	2	3
1	(India) (United States)	Saneeth Dayanand; Ryan Ma	15; 8	10; 15	15; 7
2	(India) (United States)	Devika Sihag; Ella Lin	11; 15	20; 21
3	(India) (United States)	Saneeth Dayanand / Sathish Karunakaran; Andre Chim / Samuel Li	15; 9	15; 9
4	(India) (United States)	Sathish Karunakaran / Vaishnavi Khadkekar; Arthur Lee / Katelin Ngo	11; 15	15; 3	15; 12
5	(India) (United States)	Tasnim Mir / Varshini Viswanath Sri; Koyu Chou / Veronica Yang				not played

France
0
Westenergie Sporthalle Court 1
19 July 2025 09:00 UTC+2

Malaysia
3

			1	2	3
1	(France) (Malaysia)	Lucas Renoir / Flavie Vallet; Wee Yee Hern / Clarissa San	13; 15	16; 14	12; 15
2	(France) (Malaysia)	Enogat Roy; Kok Jing Hong	15; 17	15; 13	11; 15
3	(France) (Malaysia)	Romane Cloteaux-Foucault; Wong Ling Ching	10; 15	15; 11	13; 15
4	(France) (Malaysia)	Maël Cattoen / Lucas Renoir; Bryan Goonting / Fazriq Razif				not played
5	(France) (Malaysia)	Romane Cloteaux-Foucault / Flavie Vallet; Lee Xin Jie / Low Yeen Yuan				not played

Ukraine
0
Westenergie Sporthalle Court 4
19 July 2025 09:00 UTC+2

Japan
3

			1	2	3
1	(Ukraine) (Japan)	Dmytro Shcherbatiuk / Sofiia Lavrova; Rei Miyashita / Sumire Nakade	9; 15	6; 15
2	(Ukraine) (Japan)	Vitaliy Reva; Kosuke Masumoto	9; 15	10; 15
3	(Ukraine) (Japan)	Anastasiia Alymova; Yuka Kobayashi	7; 15	8; 15
4	(Ukraine) (Japan)	Vitaliy Reva / Dmytro Shcherbatiuk; Shiina Sato / Tsubasa Yoshida				not played
5	(Ukraine) (Japan)	Anastasiia Alymova / Sofiia Lavrova; Mirai Hirose / Suzu Nakahara				not played

Spain
0
Westenergie Sporthalle Court 2
19 July 2025 09:00 UTC+2

Chinese Taipei
3

			1	2	3
1	(Spain) (Chinese Taipei)	Jacobo Fernández / Carlos Piris; Chen Zhi-ray / Lin Yu-chieh	8; 15	10; 15
2	(Spain) (Chinese Taipei)	Ana Nóvoa; Huang Ching-ping	4; 15	8; 15
3	(Spain) (Chinese Taipei)	Miguel Esteve; Ting Yen-chen	9; 15	12; 15
4	(Spain) (Chinese Taipei)	Ana Ramírez / Amaia Torralba; Jheng Yu-chieh / Sung Yu-hsuan				not played
5	(Spain) (Chinese Taipei)	Daniel Franco / Carmen Jiménez; Wu Hsuan-yi / Yang Chu-yun				not played

==== Quarterfinals ====
South Korea
3
Westenergie Sporthalle Court 2
19 July 2025 19:30 UTC+2

Hong Kong
0

			1	2	3
1	(South Korea) (Hong Kong)	Jin Yong / Lee Jong-min; Chan Cheuk Lok / Lau Sin Hei	15; 5	15; 12
2	(South Korea) (Hong Kong)	Choi Hyo-won / Lee Hye-won; Fu Chi Yan / Yuet Yee Leung	10; 8			retired
3	(South Korea) (Hong Kong)	Choi Ji-hoon; Ko Shing Hei				not played
4	(South Korea) (Hong Kong)	Lee So-yul; Saloni Mehta				not played
5	(South Korea) (Hong Kong)	Lee Jong-min / Kim Yun-ju; Ko Shing Hei / Fu Chi Yan				w/o

India
3
Westenergie Sporthalle Court 4
19 July 2025 19:30 UTC+2

Malaysia
2

			1	2	3
1	(India) (Malaysia)	Sathish Karunakaran / Vaishnavi Khadkekar; Wee Yee Hern / Clarissa San	15; 9	11; 15	15; 11
2	(India) (Malaysia)	Saneeth Dayanand; Kok Jing Hong	15; 9	13; 15	11; 15
3	(India) (Malaysia)	Devika Sihag; Siti Zulaikha	15; 5	8; 15	15; 12
4	(India) (Malaysia)	Saneeth Dayanand / Sathish Karunakaran; Bryan Goonting / Fazriq Razif	8; 15	6; 15
5	(India) (Malaysia)	Tasnim Mir / Varshini Viswanath Sri; Lee Xin Jie / Low Yeen Yuan	9; 15	15; 13	15; 13

China
3
Westenergie Sporthalle Court 3
19 July 2025 19:30 UTC+2

Thailand
0

			1	2	3
1	(China) (Thailand)	Liao Pinyi / Li Qian; Pakkapon Teeraratsakul / Chasinee Korepap	15; 11	15; 10
2	(China) (Thailand)	Wang Zijun; Panitchaphon Teeraratsakul	16; 14	15; 9
3	(China) (Thailand)	Yuan Anqi; Lalinrat Chaiwan	16; 14	15; 11
4	(China) (Thailand)	Cui Hechen / Peng Jianqin; Peeratchai Sukphun / Pakkapon Teeraratsakul				not played
5	(China) (Thailand)	Liu Jiayue / Wang Yiduo; Chasinee Korepap / Patida Srisawat				not played

Japan
1
Westenergie Sporthalle Court 1
19 July 2025 19:30 UTC+2

Chinese Taipei
3

			1	2	3
1	(Japan) (Chinese Taipei)	Rei Miyashita / Sumire Nakade; Wu Hsuan-yi / Yang Chu-yun	13; 15	15; 13	15; 10
2	(Japan) (Chinese Taipei)	Kosuke Masumoto; Su Li-yang	12; 15	16; 14	13; 15
3	(Japan) (Chinese Taipei)	Shiina Sato / Tsubasa Yoshida; Chen Zhi-ray / Lin Yu-chieh	10; 15	6; 15
4	(Japan) (Chinese Taipei)	Yuka Kobayashi; Wang Pei-yu	15; 11	16; 18	12; 15
5	(Japan) (Chinese Taipei)	Mirai Hirose / Suzu Nakahara; Jheng Yu-chieh / Yang Chu-yun				not played

==== Semifinals ====
China
3
Westenergie Sporthalle Court 1
20 July 2025 12:30 UTC+2

South Korea
1

			1	2	3
1	(China) (South Korea)	Cui Hechen / Peng Jianqin; Jin Yong / Lee Jong-min	12; 15	11; 15
2	(China) (South Korea)	Yuan Anqi; Lee So-yul	15; 13	15; 10
3	(China) (South Korea)	Wang Zijun; Choi Ji-hoon	19; 17	15; 12
4	(China) (South Korea)	Liu Jiayue / Wang Yiduo; Choi Hyo-won / Lee Hye-won	15; 11	13; 15	15; 9
5	(China) (South Korea)	Liao Pinyi / Li Qian; Jin Yong / Kim Yun-ju				not played

India
1
Westenergie Sporthalle Court 2
20 July 2025 12:30 UTC+8

Chinese Taipei
3

			1	2	3
1	(India) (Chinese Taipei)	Sathish Karunakaran; Su Li-yang	13; 15	15; 13	10; 15
2	(India) (Chinese Taipei)	Devika Sihag; Huang Ching-ping	15; 10	15; 10
3	(India) (Chinese Taipei)	Saneeth Dayanand / Sathish Karunakaran; Chen Zhi-ray / Lin Yu-chieh	8; 15	13; 15
4	(India) (Chinese Taipei)	Tasnim Mir / Varshini Viswanath Sri; Hsu Yin-hui / Yang Chu-yun	3; 15	8; 15
5	(India) (Chinese Taipei)	Saneeth Dayanand / Vaishnavi Khadkekar; Wu Hsuan-yi / Jheng Yu-chieh				not played

==== Final ====
China
3
Westenergie Sporthalle Court 1
20 July 2025 19:30 UTC+2

Chinese Taipei
1

			1	2	3
1	(China) (Chinese Taipei)	Cui Hechen / Peng Jianqin; Chen Zhi-ray / Lin Yu-chieh	15; 13	15; 10
2	(China) (Chinese Taipei)	Yuan Anqi; Wang Pei-yu	12; 15	15; 12	15; 7
3	(China) (Chinese Taipei)	Wang Zijun; Su Li-yang	15; 13	14; 16	12; 15
4	(China) (Chinese Taipei)	Liu Jiayue / Wang Yiduo; Jheng Yu-chieh / Sung Yu-hsuan	15; 8	15; 13
5	(China) (Chinese Taipei)	Liao Pinyi / Li Qian; Chen Cheng-kuan / Hsu Yin-hui				not played

=== 9th to 13th place classification round ===
==== 9th to 13th places ====
Germany
3
Westenergie Sporthalle Court 1
19 July 2025 16:00 UTC+2

Netherlands
0

			1	2	3
1	(Germany) (Netherlands)	Malik Bourakkadi / Thuc Phuong Nguyen; Brian Wassink / Iris van Leijsen	15; 9	19; 17
2	(Germany) (Netherlands)	Kian-Yu Oei; Lars Kros	15; 5	15; 9
3	(Germany) (Netherlands)	Jonathan Dresp / Simon Krax; Ties van der Lecq / Brian Wassink	12; 15	15; 13	15; 13
4	(Germany) (Netherlands)	Miranda Wilson; Amy Tan				not played
5	(Germany) (Netherlands)	Leona Michalski / Thuc Phuong Nguyen; Diede Odijk / Iris van Leijsen				not played

Australia
0
Westenergie Sporthalle Court 4
19 July 2025 16:00 UTC+2

Canada
3

			1	2	3
1	(Australia) (Canada)	Asher Ooi; Timothy Lock	8; 15	9; 15
2	(Australia) (Canada)	Yuelin Zhang; Chloe Hoang	8; 15	7; 15
3	(Australia) (Canada)	Jordan Wang / Otto Zhao; Kiren Milan Deraj / Nathan Mills	7; 15	9; 15
4	(Australia) (Canada)	Sydney Go / Priska Kustiadi; Sophia Nong / Sherry Wu				not played
5	(Australia) (Canada)	Jordan Wang / Sydney Go; Timothy Lock / Chloe Hoang				not played

United States
3
Westenergie Sporthalle Court 2
19 July 2025 16:00 UTC+2

France
2

			1	2	3
1	(United States) (France)	Arthur Lee / Katelin Ngo; Lucas Renoir / Flavie Vallet	16; 18	15; 13	15; 8
2	(United States) (France)	Ryan Ma; Enogat Roy	5; 15	7; 15
3	(United States) (France)	Natalie Chi; Romane Cloteaux-Foucault	10; 15	15; 11	15; 5
4	(United States) (France)	Samuel Li / Andrew Yuan; Natan Begga / Baptiste Labarthe	11; 15	17; 15	6; 15
5	(United States) (France)	Koyu Chou / Xin Huang; Romane Cloteaux-Foucault / Flavie Vallet	15; 11	15; 8

Ukraine
1
Westenergie Sporthalle Court 3
19 July 2025 16:00 UTC+2

Spain
3

			1	2	3
1	(Ukraine) (Spain)	Vitaliy Reva / Anastasiia Alymova; Daniel Franco / Carmen Jiménez	14; 16	16; 18
2	(Ukraine) (Spain)	Dmytro Shcherbatiuk; Álvaro Leal	15; 8	5; 15	9; 15
3	(Ukraine) (Spain)	Sofiia Lavrova; Ana Ramírez	15; 8	15; 7
4	(Ukraine) (Spain)	Vitaliy Reva / Dmytro Shcherbatiuk; Daniel Franco / Carlos Piris	9; 15	7; 15
5	(Ukraine) (Spain)	Anastasiia Alymova / Sofiia Lavrova; Nikol Carulla / Carmen Jiménez				not played

==== 9th to 11th places ====
Germany
3
Westenergie Sporthalle Court 1
20 July 2025 09:00 UTC+2

Canada
1

			1	2	3
1	(Germany) (Canada)	Malik Bourakkadi / Leona Michalski; Timothy Lock / Chloe Hoang	13; 15	15; 8	15; 13
2	(Germany) (Canada)	Matthias Kicklitz; Victor Lai	6; 15	14; 16
3	(Germany) (Canada)	Malik Bourakkadi / David Eckerlin; Nathan Mills / Harold Tan	15; 11	15; 5
4	(Germany) (Canada)	Miranda Wilson; Chloe Hoang	15; 11	11; 15	15; 6
5	(Germany) (Canada)	Leona Michalski / Thuc Phuong Nguyen; Sophia Nong / Sherry Wu				not played

United States
2
Westenergie Sporthalle Court 2
20 July 2025 09:00 UTC+2

Spain
3

			1	2	3
1	(United States) (Spain)	Arthur Lee / Katelin Ngo; Daniel Franco / Carmen Jiménez	16; 14	15; 8
2	(United States) (Spain)	Ryan Ma; Miguel Esteve	11; 15	15; 6	13; 15
3	(United States) (Spain)	Andre Chim / Andrew Yuan; Daniel Franco / Carlos Piris	10; 15	13; 15
4	(United States) (Spain)	Ella Lin; Cristina Teruel	15; 6	15; 13
5	(United States) (Spain)	Koyu Chou / Veronica Yang; Nikol Carulla / Carmen Jiménez	15; 13	13; 15	8; 15

==== 9th place ====
Germany
3
Westenergie Sporthalle Court 1
20 July 2025 16:00 UTC+2

Spain
0

			1	2	3
1	(Germany) (Spain)	Malik Bourakkadi / Leona Michalski; Jacobo Fernández / Nikol Carulla	15; 12	15; 13
2	(Germany) (Spain)	Kian-Yu Oei; Álvaro Leal	15; 13	15; 11
3	(Germany) (Spain)	Jonathan Dresp / Simon Krax; Daniel Franco / Carlos Piris	8; 15	15; 13	15; 13
4	(Germany) (Spain)	Miranda Wilson; Cristina Teruel				not played
5	(Germany) (Spain)	Leona Michalski / Thuc Phuong Nguyen; Nikol Carulla / Carmen Jiménez				not played

=== 17th to 21st place classification round ===
17th to 21st places
E3	Singapore	3
F3	Macau	2

17th to 19th places
B3	Azerbaijan	3
C3	Hungary	2
E3	Singapore	2
G3	Poland	3

17th place
B3	Azerbaijan	0
G3	Poland	3

==== 17th to 21st places ====
Singapore
3
Westenergie Sporthalle Court 1
19 July 2025 12:30 UTC+2

Macau
2

			1	2	3
1	(Singapore) (Macau)	Justyn Sim / Grace Tan; Pui Chi Chon / Ieong Sam Kio	8; 15	18; 20
2	(Singapore) (Macau)	Melcom Lim; Ao Fei Long	15; 1	15; 5
3	(Singapore) (Macau)	Sharifah Danial; Pui Chi Wa	4; 15	12; 15
4	(Singapore) (Macau)	Darrion Ng / Justyn Sim; Pui Chi Chon / Vong Kok Weng	15; 6	15; 12
5	(Singapore) (Macau)	Sabrina Lee / Grace Tan; Pui Chi Wa / Wang Wai Kei	15; 6	15; 12

==== 17th to 19th places ====
Azerbaijan
3
Westenergie Sporthalle Court 4
20 July 2025 09:00 UTC+2

Hungary
2

			1	2	3
1	(Azerbaijan) (Hungary)	Murad Shabanzade / Nigar Samadova; Barnabás Tóth / Fanni Kiss	10; 15	7; 15
2	(Azerbaijan) (Hungary)	Agil Gabilov; Balázs Pápai	15; 13	12; 15	15; 9
3	(Azerbaijan) (Hungary)	Hajar Nuriyeva; Tünde Takács	9; 15	15; 8	17; 15
4	(Azerbaijan) (Hungary)	Agil Gabilov / Murad Shabanzade; Bene Kiss / Bálint Pápai	15; 12	12; 15	15; 17
5	(Azerbaijan) (Hungary)	Hajar Nuriyeva / Nigar Samadova; Fanni Kiss / Hella Szűcs	15; 5	15; 13

Singapore
2
Westenergie Sporthalle Court 3
20 July 2025 09:00 UTC+2

Poland
3

			1	2	3
1	(Singapore) (Poland)	Darrion Ng / Timothy Phang; Bartłomiej Butkus / Jan Wilczak	15; 10	15; 10
2	(Singapore) (Poland)	Joanna Wu; Weronika Górniak	10; 15	12; 15
3	(Singapore) (Poland)	Melcom Lim; Andrzej Niczyporuk	5; 15	15; 13	15; 10
4	(Singapore) (Poland)	Sabrina Lee / Grace Tan; Anastasia Khomich / Julia Piwowar	15; 10	12; 15	14; 16
5	(Singapore) (Poland)	Timothy Phang / Chloe Chan; Bartłomiej Butkus / Daria Zimnol	17; 19	14; 16

==== 17th place ====
Azerbaijan
0
Westenergie Sporthalle Court 2
20 July 2025 16:00 UTC+2

Poland
3

			1	2	3
1	(Azerbaijan) (Poland)	Agil Gabilov / Hajar Nuriyeva; Łukasz Cimosz / Julia Piwowar	10; 15	16; 18
2	(Azerbaijan) (Poland)	Murad Shabanzade; Andrzej Niczyporuk	5; 15	2; 15
3	(Azerbaijan) (Poland)	Nigar Samadova; Weronika Górniak	16; 18	8; 15
4	(Azerbaijan) (Poland)	Agil Gabilov / Murad Shabanzade; Łukasz Cimosz / Jan Wilczak				not played
5	(Azerbaijan) (Poland)	Hajar Nuriyeva / Nigar Samadova; Ulyana Volskaya / Daria Zimnol				not played

== Final ranking ==
Pos	Team
1st place, gold medalist(s)	China
2nd place, silver medalist(s)	Chinese Taipei
3rd place, bronze medalist(s)	India
3rd place, bronze medalist(s)	South Korea
5	Hong Kong
5	Japan
5	Malaysia
5	Thailand
9	Germany
10	Spain
11	Canada
11	United States
13	Australia
13	France
13	Netherlands
13	Ukraine
17	Poland
18	Azerbaijan
19	Hungary
19	Singapore
21	Macau
