= Sung Yu-hsuan =

Taiwanese badminton player

Sung Yu-hsuan 宋祐媗
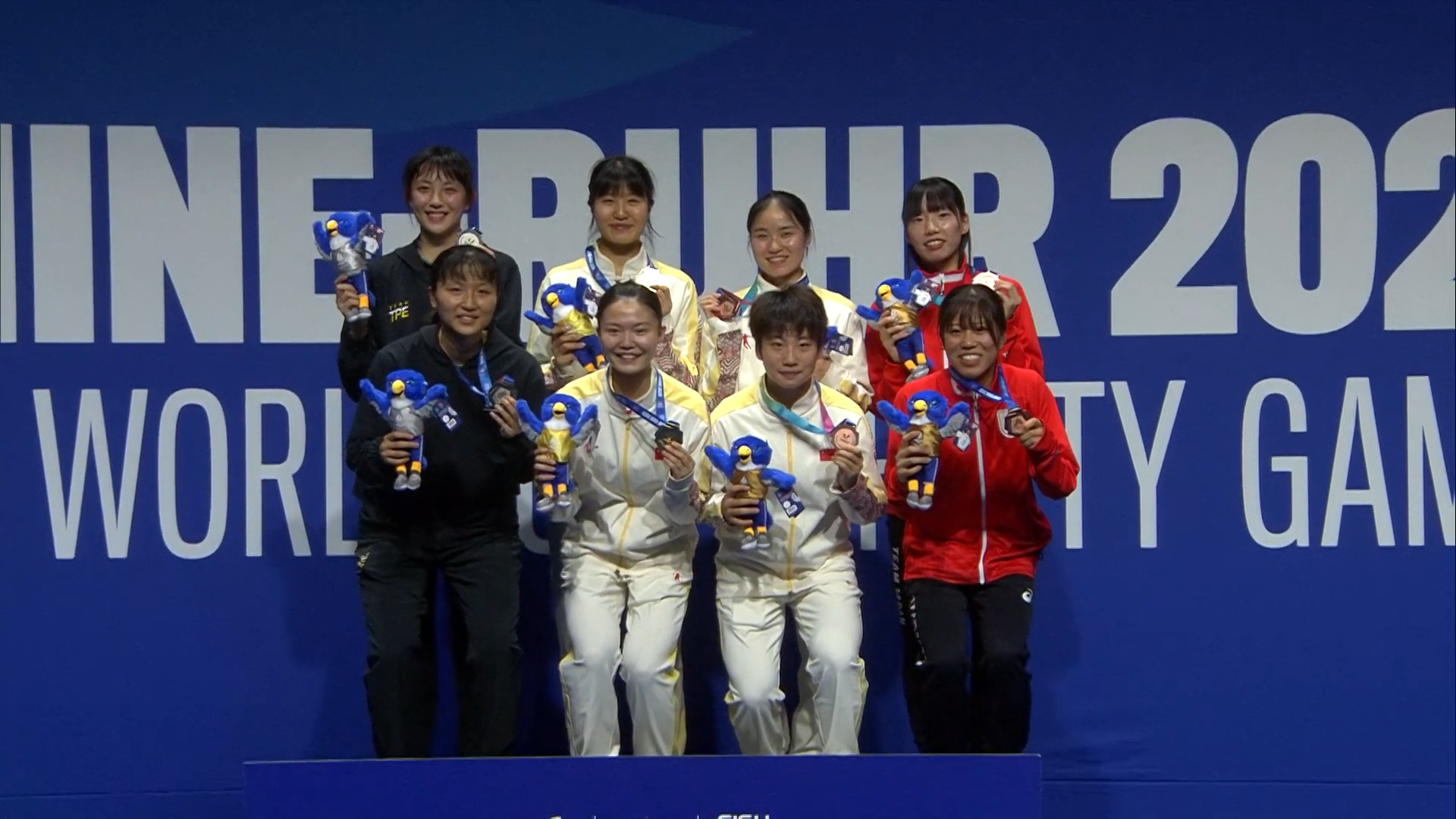
- Sung Yu-hsuan (back row, far left) at the women's doubles medal ceremony at the 2025 Summer World University Games

Personal information
- Born: 8 April 2003 (age 23) Taiwan
- Height: 1.77 m (5 ft 10 in)

Sport
- Country: Republic of China (Taiwan)
- Sport: Badminton
- Handedness: Right

Women's & mixed doubles
- Highest ranking: 13 (WD with Hsu Ya-ching, 10 March 2026); 121 (XD with Tsai Fu-cheng, 3 November 2026)
- Current ranking: 18 (WD with Hsu Ya-ching); 123 (XD with Tsai Fu-cheng) (10 November 2026)
- BWF profile
Medal record
Women's badminton
Representing Chinese Taipei
Asia Team Championships
Bronze medal – third place	2026 Qingdao	Women's team
World University Games
Silver medal – second place	2025 Rhine-Ruhr	Mixed team
Silver medal – second place	2025 Rhine-Ruhr	Women's doubles

Sung Yu-hsuan (born April 8, 2003) is a badminton player that born in Taiwan, representing Chinese Taipei.

== Career ==
In 2025, Sung participated in the World University Games, where she won a silver medal in the mixed team event. She also won another silver medal in the women's doubles event, partnering with Jheng Yu-chieh.

In 2026, Sung won a bronze medal at the Badminton Asia Team Championships in the women's team event.

== Achievement ==
=== World University Games ===
Women's doubles
Year	Venue	Partner	Opponent	Score	Result	Ref.
2025	Westenergie Sporthalle; Mülheim, Germany	(Chinese Taipei) Jheng Yu-chieh	(China) Li Qian (China) Wang Yiduo	8–15, 15–7, 9–15	Silver	

=== BWF World Tour (1 runner-up) ===
The BWF World Tour, which was announced on 19 March 2017 and implemented in 2018, is a series of elite badminton tournaments sanctioned by the Badminton World Federation (BWF). The BWF World Tour is divided into levels of World Tour Finals, Super 1000, Super 750, Super 500, Super 300, and the BWF Tour Super 100.

Women's doubles

Year	Tournament	Level	Partner	Opponent	Score	Result	Ref
2025	U.S. Open	Super 300	(Chinese Taipei) Hsu Ya-ching	(Thailand) Benyapa Aimsaard (Thailand) Nuntakarn Aimsaard	15–21, 15–21	(silver) Runner-up	

=== BWF International Challenge/Series & Future Series (1 title, 2 runners-up) ===
Women's doubles
Year	Tournament	Partner	Opponent	Score	Result	Ref.
2022	Indonesia International	(Chinese Taipei) Wang Szu-min	(Indonesia) Anggia Shitta Awanda (Indonesia) Putri Larasati	19–21, 20–22	(silver) Runner-up	
2023	Malaysia International	(Chinese Taipei) Lin Chih-chun	(Malaysia) Ng Qi Xuan (Malaysia) Yap Yee	21–11, 21–18	(gold) Winner	
2025	Vietnam International	(Chinese Taipei) Hsu Ya-ching	(Japan) Hina Osawa (Japan) Akari Sato	13–21, 12–21	(silver) Runner-up	

BWF International Challenge tournament
BWF International Series tournament
BWF Future Series tournament
