= Devika Sihag =

Indian badminton player (born 2005)

Personal information
- Born: 18 April 2005 (age 21) Haryana, India

Sport
- Country: India
- Sport: Badminton
- Handedness: Right

Women's singles
- Highest ranking: 31 (30 June 2026)
- Current ranking: 35 (3 November 2026)
- BWF profile
Medal record
Women's badminton
Representing India
World University Games
Bronze medal – third place	2025 Rhine-Ruhr	Mixed team

Devika Sihag (born 18 April 2005) is an Indian badminton player.

== Achievements ==
=== BWF World Tour (1 title, 1 runner-up) ===
The BWF World Tour, which was announced on 19 March 2017 and implemented in 2018, is a series of elite badminton tournaments sanctioned by the Badminton World Federation (BWF). The BWF World Tours are divided into levels of World Tour Finals, Super 1000, Super 750, Super 500, Super 300 (part of the HSBC World Tour), and the BWF Tour Super 100.

Women's singles
Year	Tournament	Level	Opponent	Score	Result
2025 (II)	Indonesia Masters	Super 100	(Japan) Nozomi Okuhara	11–21, 9–21	(silver) Runner-up
2026	Thailand Masters	Super 300	(Malaysia) Goh Jin Wei	21–8, 6–3 retired	(gold) Winner

=== BWF International (4 titles, 2 runners-up) ===
Women's singles
Year	Tournament	Opponent	Score	Result
2024	Estonian International	(France) Rosy Pancasari	19–21, 14–21	(silver) Runner-up
2024	Swedish Open	(France) Léonice Huet	16–21, 21–14, 21–19	(gold) Winner
2024	Portugal International	(Canada) Rachel Chan	21–16, 21–16	(gold) Winner
2024	Dutch International	(India) Isharani Baruah	21–19, 21–23, 14–21	(silver) Runner-up
2025	Malaysia International	(India) Isharani Baruah	15–7, 15–12	(gold) Winner
2026	Azerbaijan International	(India) Navya Kanderi	21–10, 21–13	(gold) Winner

BWF International Challenge tournament
BWF International Series tournament
BWF Future Series tournament
