= Westenergie Sporthalle =

Indoor sports arena in Mülheim, Germany

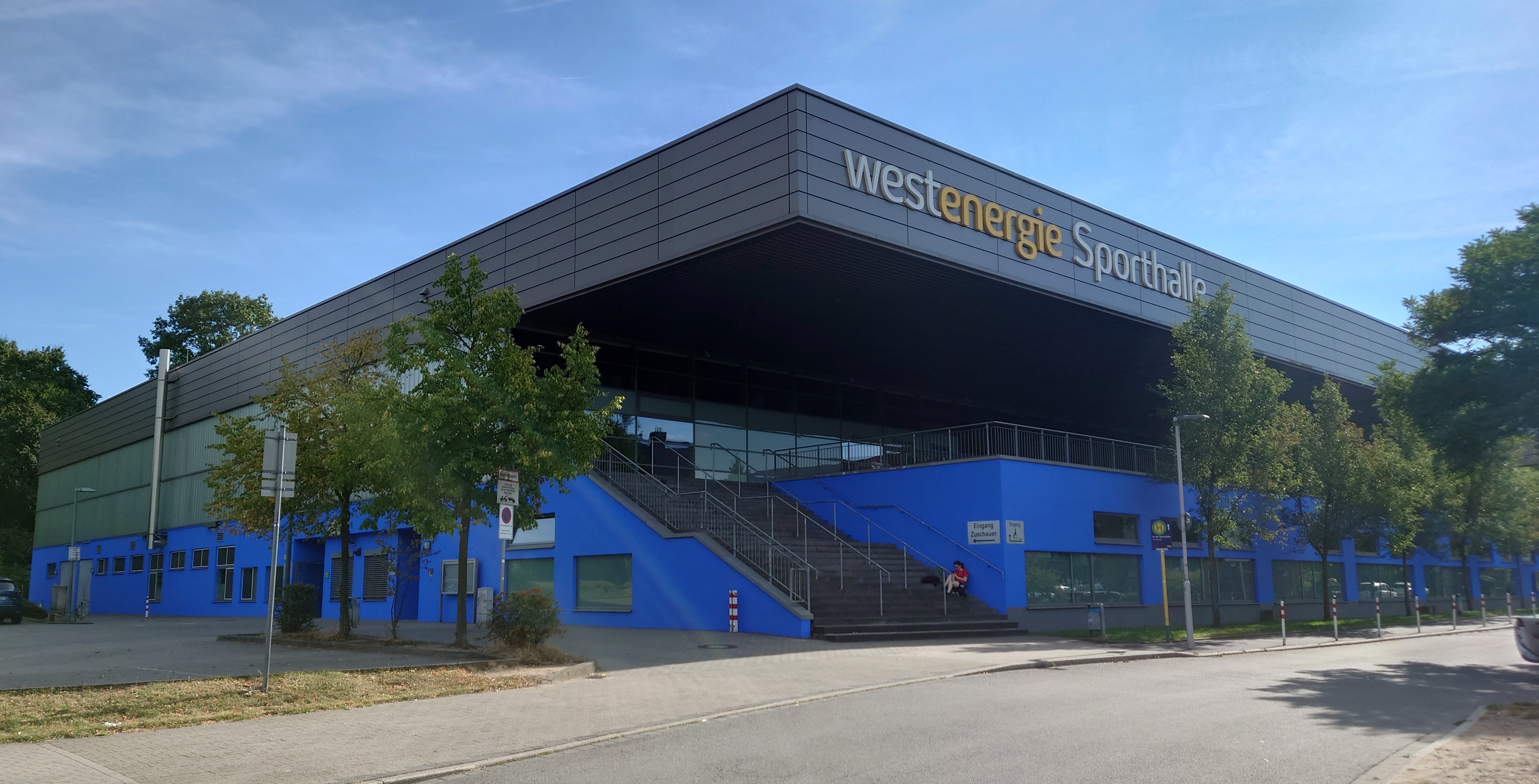
- Interactive map of Westenergie Sporthalle
- Address: An den Sportstätten 6 Mülheim an der Ruhr, Germany
- Coordinates: 51°25′24″N 6°53′35″E
- Capacity: 4,000 (incl. 1,000 standing)
- Field size: 31 × 57.5 m

Construction
- Groundbreaking: 2003
- Built: 2003-2005
- Opened: 5 February 2005

Tenants
- German Open (badminton); HSG Mülheim (handball)

Westenergie Sporthalle (formerly known as RWE Rhein-Ruhr Sporthalle, RWE-Sporthalle or Innogy Sporthalle), is an indoor sports arena in Mülheim an der Ruhr, Germany. The arena is commonly used for badminton, boxing, and handball competitions. Its current name is part of partnership with German energy company Westenergie, a subsidiary of E.ON.

== History ==
The first foundation stone was laid on 3 July 2003 and the construction time took 19 months. During the first month of opening, it hosted city-level indoor football championships, followed by German Open badminton championships. It also hosted some events of 2005 World Games.
