= 2017 BWF World Junior Championships – Boys' doubles =

2017 BWF World Junior Championships Boys' doubles
Tournament details
- Dates: 16 October 2017 – 22 October 2017
- Edition: 19th
- Level: International
- Venue: Among Rogo Sports Hall
- Location: Yogyakarta

The boys' doubles event of the 2017 BWF World Junior Championships was held on 16–22 October. The defending champions were Han Chengkai and Zhou Haodong from China.

== Seeds ==
1. (South Korea) Kang Min-hyuk / Kim Won-ho (semifinals)
2. (Chinese Taipei) Su Li-wei / Ye Hong-wei (second round)
3. (India) Krishna Prasad Garaga / Dhruv Kapila (fourth round)
4. (Japan) Mahiro Kaneko / Yunosuke Kubota (champion)
5. (Thailand) Wachirawit Sothon / Natthapat Trinkajee (quarterfinals)
6. (Republic of Ireland) Nhat Nguyen / Paul Reynolds (third round)
7. (France) Eloi Adam / Samy Corvee (third round)
8. (Scotland) Christopher Grimley / Matthew Grimley (fourth round)

9. (Sweden) Adam Gozzi / Carl Harrbacka (second round)
10. (China) Chen Sihang / Fan Qiuyue (fourth round)
11. (Indonesia) Rinov Rivaldy / Yeremia Rambitan (semifinals)
12. (Russia) Georgii Karpov / Mikhail Lavrikov (second round)
13. (China) Di Zijian / Wang Chang (final)
14. (Belgium) Julien Carraggi / Jona van Nieuwkerke (second round)
15. (France) Thom Gicquel / Leo Rossi (fourth round)
16. (Italy) Fabio Caponio / Giovanni Toti (third round)

Click on the seed number of a player to go to their draw section.

== Draw ==
=== Finals ===
Quarterfinals
1	(South Korea) Kang Min-hyuk (South Korea) Kim Won-ho	21	21
5	(Thailand) Wachirawit Sothon (Thailand) Natthapat Trinkajee	12	10
4	(Japan) Mahiro Kaneko (Japan) Yunosuke Kubota	21	26
(Malaysia) Kwek Yee Jian (Malaysia) Man Wei Chong	15	24
(Chinese Taipei) Chuang Pu-sheng (Chinese Taipei) Lin Yu-chieh	14	17
11	(Indonesia) Rinov Rivaldy (Indonesia) Yeremia Rambitan	21	21
(Japan) Keita Chikugo (Japan) Naoki Yamada	26	18
13	(China) Di Zijian (China) Wang Chang	28	21

Semifinals
1	(South Korea) Kang Min-hyuk (South Korea) Kim Won-ho	21	17	19
4	(Japan) Mahiro Kaneko (Japan) Yunosuke Kubota	19	21	21
11	(Indonesia) Rinov Rivaldy (Indonesia) Yeremia Rambitan	15	17
13	(China) Di Zijian (China) Wang Chang	21	21

Finals
4	(Japan) Mahiro Kaneko (Japan) Yunosuke Kubota	21	15	21
13	(China) Di Zijian (China) Wang Chang	14	21	13

=== Top half ===
==== Section 1 ====
First round
(Spain) A Martin (Spain) J Molares	21	23	21
(Philippines) R D Cabalquinto (Philippines) J R Villarante	16	25	15
(United States) R Liuzhou (United States) Wu YT	18	18
(Poland) R Cybulski (Poland) T Malik	21	21

Second round
1	(South Korea) Kang M-h (South Korea) Kim W-h	21	21
(Germany) T Fischer (Germany) H Graalmann	10	9
(Hong Kong) Lee C L (Hong Kong) Lui C W	21	21
(Spain) A Martin (Spain) J Molares	14	16
14	(Belgium) J Carraggi (Belgium) J van Nieuwkerke	15	15
(Indonesia) M S Fikri (Indonesia) A Maulana	21	21
(Iraq) K Hussein (Iraq) M Talib	9	12
(Poland) R Cybulski (Poland) T Malik	21	21

Third round
1	(South Korea) Kang M-h (South Korea) Kim W-h	21	21
(Hong Kong) Lee C L (Hong Kong) Lui C W	6	11
(Indonesia) M S Fikri (Indonesia) A Maulana	21	21
(Poland) R Cybulski (Poland) T Malik	9	11

Fourth round
1	(South Korea) Kang M-h (South Korea) Kim W-h	21	21
(Indonesia) M S Fikri (Indonesia) A Maulana	9	18

==== Section 2 ====
First round
(Chinese Taipei) Lu-c (Chinese Taipei) Su P-w	21	21
(Bulgaria) A Popov (Bulgaria) I Stoynov	15	13
(New Zealand) O Guo (New Zealand) D Vong	21	21
(Georgia (country)) L Ninoshvili (Georgia (country)) Pavel Piltoyan	10	11
(Denmark) S Gronbjerg (Denmark) D Lundgaard	21	21
(Timor-Leste) M A Sarmento (Timor-Leste) C M D Anjos	7	5

Second round
5	(Thailand) W Sothon (Thailand) N Trinkajee	21	21
(Armenia) G Grigoryan (Armenia) A Vardanyan	4	3
(Singapore) A Tan (Singapore) Toh H Z	21	18	21
(Chinese Taipei) Lu C (Chinese Taipei) Su P-w	13	21	19
10	(China) Chen SH (China) Fan QY	21	21
(Macau) Che P N (Macau) Lam H H	10	14
(New Zealand) O Guo (New Zealand) D Vong	18	14
(Denmark) S Gronbjerg (Denmark) D Lundgaard	21	21

Third round
5	(Thailand) W Sothon (Thailand) N Trinkajee	21	21
(Singapore) A Tan (Singapore) Toh H Z	11	12
10	(China) Chen SH (China) Fan QY	21	21
(Denmark) S Gronbjerg (Denmark) D Lundgaard	13	12

Fourth round
5	(Thailand) W Sothon (Thailand) N Trinkajee	15	21	22
10	(China) Chen SH (China) Fan QY	21	14	20

==== Section 3 ====
First round
(Norway) O H Imset (Norway) B Norden	4	11
(Brazil) F Farias (Brazil) W V E Santos	21	21
(Canada) D Wang (Canada) B Yang	21	21
(Turkey) B Cicen (Turkey) T Tasdemir	14	11
(Latvia) A Kelpe (Latvia) M Loiko	4	10
(Finland) A Monnberg (Finland) J Paul	21	21

Second round
4	(Japan) M Kaneko (Japan) Y Kubota	21	21
(India) M S Khwairakpam (India) D S Konthoujam	11	18
(South Africa) J Elliot (South Africa) S Noone	8	10
(Brazil) F Farias (Brazil) W V E Santos	21	21
15	(France) T Gicquel (France) L Rossi	21	21
(Brunei) M H H Bakri (Brunei) Lee J S	7	10
(Canada) D Wang (Canada) B Yang	16	21	18
(Finland) A Monnberg (Finland) J Paul	21	17	21

Third round
4	(Japan) M Kaneko (Japan) Y Kubota	21	21
(Brazil) F Farias (Brazil) W V E Santos	16	17
15	(France) T Gicquel (France) L Rossi	21	21
(Finland) A Monnberg (Finland) J Paul	15	7

Fourth round
4	(Japan) M Kaneko (Japan) Y Kubota	21	17	21
15	(France) T Gicquel (France) L Rossi	13	21	12

==== Section 4 ====
First round
(Saudi Arabia) M Al Ghamdi (Saudi Arabia) N Al Ghamdi	7	6
(Slovakia) A Horak (Slovakia) P Hrncar	21	21
(Australia) M Kong (Australia) P Yan	21	21
(Egypt) M M Kamel (Egypt) B T Abdelrahim	7	6
(Malaysia) Chia W J (Malaysia) Tee K W	21	21
(Maldives) M A Ali (Maldives) A Nibal	6	5

Second round
6	(Republic of Ireland) N Nguyen (Republic of Ireland) P Reynolds	21	21
(Vietnam) Le T L (Vietnam) Nguyen X M	11	11
(Malaysia) Kwek Y J (Malaysia) Man W C	21	21
(Slovakia) A Horak (Slovakia) P Hrncar	9	7
12	(Russia) G Karpov (Russia) M Lavrikov	9	18
(England) R Easton (England) H Huang	21	21
(Australia) M Kong (Australia) P Yan	7	11
(Malaysia) Chia W J (Malaysia) Tee K W	21	21

Third round
6	(Republic of Ireland) N Nguyen (Republic of Ireland) P Reynolds	18	13
(Malaysia) Kwek Y J (Malaysia) Man W C	21	21
(England) R Easton (England) H Huang	15	16
(Malaysia) Chia W J (Malaysia) Tee K W	21	21

Fourth round
(Malaysia) Kwek Y J (Malaysia) Man W C	21	21
(Malaysia) Chia W J (Malaysia) Tee K W	14	14

=== Bottom half ===
==== Section 5 ====
First round
(Finland) J Honkanen (Finland) M Lahtinen	9	12
(Chinese Taipei) Chuang P-s (Chinese Taipei) Lin Y-c	21	21
(Bulgaria) D Marinov (Slovakia) L Milic
(Singapore) R Loh (Singapore) H Wong	w	/	o
(United States) B Kan (United States) E Low	20	21
(Nepal) P Maharjan (Nepal) R Maharjan	22	23

Second round
(Chinese Taipei) Chuang P-s (Chinese Taipei) Lin Y-c	21	21
(Singapore) R Loh (Singapore) H Wong	15	9
(Thailand) W Phakjarung (Thailand) P Saengvanich	23	12	21
9	(Sweden) A Gozzi (Sweden) C Harrbacka	21	21	18
(Nepal) P Maharjan (Nepal) R Maharjan	16	15
(Denmark) R E F Prasz (Denmark) M Thogersen	21	21
(Switzerland) D Orteu (Switzerland) J Scheiwiller	7	14
8	(Scotland) C Grimley (Scotland) M Grimley	21	21

Third round
(Chinese Taipei) Chuang P-s (Chinese Taipei) Lin Y-c	21	16	21
(Thailand) W Phakjarung (Thailand) P Saengvanich	15	21	16
(Denmark) R E F Prasz (Denmark) M Thogersen	21	15	13
8	(Scotland) C Grimley (Scotland) M Grimley	17	21	21

Fourth round
(Chinese Taipei) Chuang P-s (Chinese Taipei) Lin Y-c	20	21	21
8	(Scotland) C Grimley (Scotland) M Grimley	22	17	16

==== Section 6 ====
First round
(Kenya) U O Shah (Kenya) U O Shah	7	5
(Russia) V Kokhanov (Russia) N Lemeshko	21	21
(Hong Kong) Chow H L (Hong Kong) Mak P N	21	21
(Sri Lanka) K Amarasena (Sri Lanka) R Sasindu	13	18
(El Salvador) U Canjura (El Salvador) C Henrriquez	10	5
(India) S S Dhanraj (India) S Elango	21	21

Second round
(Russia) V Kokhanov (Russia) N Lemeshko	8	13
(Hong Kong) Chow H L (Hong Kong) Mak P N	21	21
(Japan) H Midorikawa (Japan) H Nakayama	19	17
11	(Indonesia) R Rivaldy (Indonesia) Y Rambitan	21	21
(India) S S Dhanraj (India) S Elango	14	11
(South Korea) Shin T-y (South Korea) Wang C	21	21
(Malaysia) Chang Y J (Malaysia) Ng E C	16	23	16
3	(India) K P Garaga (India) D Kapila	21	21	21

Third round
(Hong Kong) Chow H L (Hong Kong) Mak P N	8	19
11	(Indonesia) R Rivaldy (Indonesia) Y Rambitan	21	21
(South Korea) Shin T-y (South Korea) Wang C	12	16
3	(India) K P Garaga (India) D Kapila	21	21

Fourth round
11	(Indonesia) R Rivaldy (Indonesia) Y Rambitan	21	21
3	(India) K P Garaga (India) D Kapila	17	17

==== Section 7 ====
First round
(Thailand) P Nipornram (Thailand) W Sarapat	21	21
(Netherlands) G Duijs (Netherlands) W van der Aar	10	11
(Czech Republic) J Janostik (Czech Republic) T Svejda	21	21
(Macau) Leong I C (Macau) Pui P F	15	19
(Poland) K Ploch (Poland) A Szolc	12	13
(Japan) K Chikugo (Japan) N Yamada	21	21

Second round
(Thailand) P Nipornram (Thailand) W Sarapat	21	21
(Czech Republic) J Janostik (Czech Republic) T Svejda	18	10
(Mongolia) S Enkhbat (Mongolia) T Gombodorj	11	5
16	(Italy) F Caponio (Italy) G Toti	21	21
(Japan) K Chikugo (Japan) N Yamada	21	21
(Australia) Lin Y X (Australia) Teoh K C	9	12
(New Zealand) J Boyle (New Zealand) J Seto	9	8
7	(France) E Adam (France) S Corvee	21	21

Third round
(Thailand) P Nipornram (Thailand) W Sarapat	18	15
16	(Italy) F Caponio (Italy) G Toti	21	21
(Japan) K Chikugo (Japan) N Yamada	21	21
7	(France) E Adam (France) S Corvee	19	16

Fourth round
(Thailand) P Nipornram (Thailand) W Sarapat	18	9
(Japan) K Chikugo (Japan) N Yamada	21	21

==== Section 8 ====
First round
(Canada) M Morneau (Canada) N Nguyen	21	21
(Pakistan) Z K Khalil (Pakistan) S Riaz	10	13
(Philippines) A S Salvado (Philippines) L R Zafra	11	15
(Indonesia) G A Prihardika (Indonesia) A B S Ramadhany	21	21
(Germany) M Kicklitz (Germany) L Resch	21	21
(Ghana) E Andrews (Ghana) D Doe	17	10

Second round
(Canada) M Morneau (Canada) N Nguyen	8	10
(Indonesia) G A Prihardika (Indonesia) A B S Ramadhany	21	21
(Hungary) M Balint (Hungary) Z Dulcz	9	16
13	(China) Di ZJ (China) Wang C	21	21
(Germany) M Kicklitz (Germany) L Resch	14	12
(England) C Hemming (England) J Torjussen	21	21
(China) Guo RH (China) Shang YC	16	21	21
2	(Chinese Taipei) Su L-w (Chinese Taipei) Ye H-w	21	19	17

Third round
(Indonesia) G A Prihardika (Indonesia) A B S Ramadhany	14	19
13	(China) Di ZJ (China) Wang C	21	21
(England) C Hemming (England) J Torjussen	8	14
(China) Guo RH (China) Shang YC	21	21

Fourth round
13	(China) Di ZJ (China) Wang C	21	21
(China) Guo RH (China) Shang YC	15	13
