= Rinov Rivaldy =

Indonesian badminton player (born 1999)

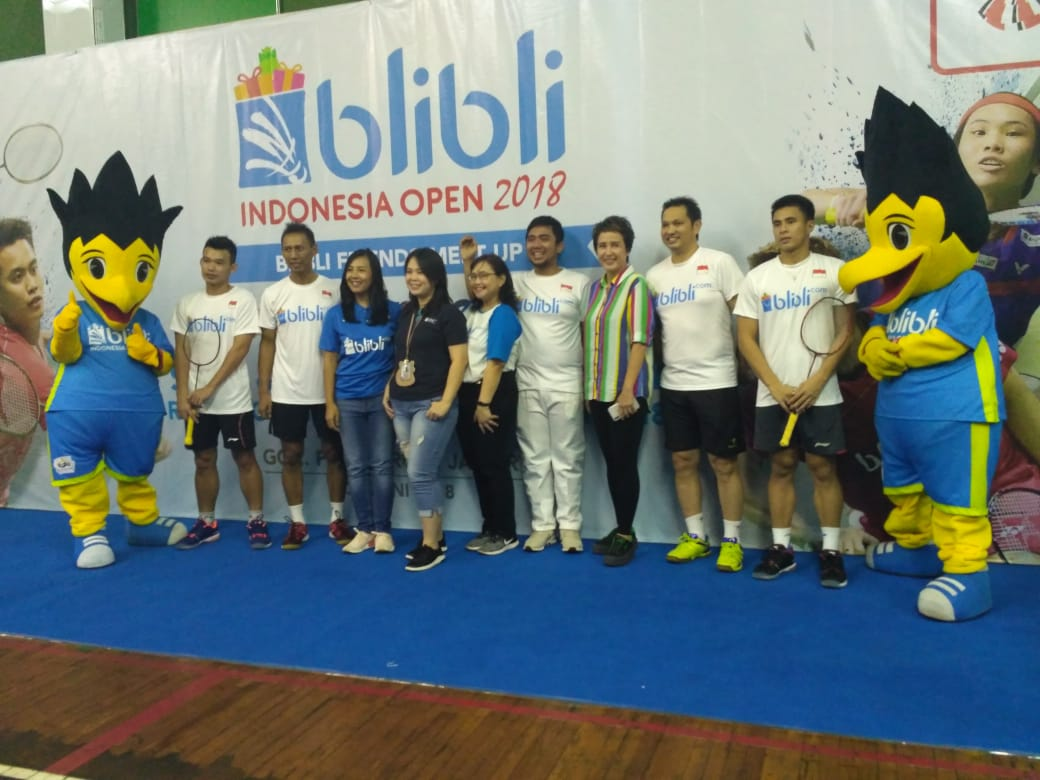

Personal information
- Born: 12 November 1999 (age 27) Bekasi, West Java, Indonesia
- Height: 1.74 m (5 ft 9 in)
- Spouse: Vania Arianti Sukoco (m. 2025)

Sport
- Country: Indonesia
- Sport: Badminton
- Handedness: Right

Men's & mixed doubles
- Highest ranking: 134 (MD with Andika Ramadiansyah, 1 September 2016); 9 (XD with Pitha Haningtyas Mentari, 27 December 2022)
- BWF profile
Medal record
Men's badminton
Representing Indonesia
Sudirman Cup
Bronze medal – third place	2025 Xiamen	Mixed team
Asia Mixed Team Championships
Gold medal – first place	2025 Qingdao	Mixed team
SEA Games
Gold medal – first place	2019 Philippines	Men's team
Bronze medal – third place	2019 Philippines	Mixed doubles
Bronze medal – third place	2021 Vietnam	Men's team
Bronze medal – third place	2021 Vietnam	Mixed doubles
World Junior Championships
Gold medal – first place	2017 Yogyakarta	Mixed doubles
Silver medal – second place	2015 Lima	Mixed team
Bronze medal – third place	2017 Yogyakarta	Boys' doubles
Asian Junior Championships
Silver medal – second place	2017 Jakarta	Mixed team
Bronze medal – third place	2016 Bangkok	Mixed doubles

Rinov Rivaldy (born 12 November 1999) is an Indonesian badminton player affiliated with Djarum club. He won the gold medal at the 2017 World Junior Championships, and bronze medals at the 2019 and 2021 SEA Games in the mixed doubles with Pitha Haningtyas Mentari.

== Career ==
In September–October 2021, Rivaldy alongside the Indonesian team competed at the 2021 Sudirman Cup in Vantaa, Finland. He won a match in the group stage against B. R. Sankeerth and Crystal Lai of Canada. Indonesia advanced to the knockout stage but lost at the quarterfinals against Malaysia.

=== 2023 ===
In January, Rivaldy and Pitha Haningtyas Mentari started 2023 BWF World Tour by losing in the first round of Malaysia Open from 8th seed Thom Gicquel and Delphine Delrue of France. In the next week, they also lost the first round of India Open from 4th seed Wang Yilyu and Huang Dongping of China. They competed in the home tournament, Indonesia Masters, but lost in the second round from unseeded Chinese pair Feng Yanzhe and Huang Dongping.

In February, Rivaldy join the Indonesia national badminton team to compete at the Badminton Asia Mixed Team Championships, but the teams lost in the quarter-finals from team Korea.

In March, Rivaldy and Mentari competed in the All England Open but had to lose in the first round from 6th seed Malaysian pair Tan Kian Meng and Lai Pei Jing. In the next tour, he competed in the Swiss Open, but had to retire in the quarter-finals from Chinese Taipei pair Ye Hong-wei and Lee Chia-hsin.

In late April, Rivaldy and Mentari competed at the Asian Championships in Dubai, United Arab Emirates, but had to lose in the quarter-finals from 8th seed Malaysian pair Goh Soon Huat and Shevon Jemie Lai in three games.

In May, Rivaldy alongside the Indonesian team competed at the 2023 Sudirman Cup in Suzhou, China. He won a match in the group stage, against Jones Ralfy Jansen and Linda Efler of Germany. Indonesia advanced to the knockout stage but lost at the quarterfinals against China, where he almost upsetting the world no. 1 Zheng Siwei and Huang Yaqiong in the first match with scrapped doubles partner Gloria Emanuelle Widjaja. In the following week, Rivaldy and Mentari competed in the second Asian Tour at the Malaysia Masters. They were lost in the quarter-finals from 3rd seed Korean pair Seo Seung-jae and Chae Yoo-jung.

In June, Rivaldy and Mentari competed at the Singapore Open, but had to lose in the second round from 2nd seed and eventual finalist Japanese pair Yuta Watanabe and Arisa Higashino. In the next tour, they competed at the home tournament, Indonesia Open, but lost in the quarter-finals from 2nd seed and eventual finalist Japanese pair Yuta Watanabe and Arisa Higashino for the second consecutive tour. In the next tour, they lost at the second round of the Taipei Open from their fellow Indonesian junior player Jafar Hidayatullah and Aisyah Pranata.

In late July, Rivaldy competed at the 2023 Japan Open, but lost in the first round against 6th seed Korean pair Seo Seung-jae and Chae Yoo-jung.

In early August, Rivaldy competed at the Australian Open, but had to lose in the quarter-finals from Chinese pair Cheng Xing and Chen Fanghui in straight games. In late August, he competed at the World Championships, but lost in the third round from 4th seed Thai pair Dechapol Puavaranukroh and Sapsiree Taerattanachai in straight games. He made his debut at the Asian Games in Hangzhou, but unable to win any medals both in the mixed doubles and team events.

=== 2025 ===
Starting 2025 with new partner Lisa Ayu Kusumawati, they played in India Open but lost since the first round to the fourth seed, Goh Soon Huat and Shevon Jemie Lai. They clinched semifinal at Indonesia Masters, but lost to the seventh seed Hiroki Midorikawa and Natsu Saito. Unfortunately they also lost in the first round on Thailand Masters to their compatriot as well as Kusumawati's ex-partner, Rehan Naufal Kusharjanto and Gloria Emanuelle Widjaja. He was a part of Indonesia's squad at Asia Mixed Team Championships in which he played with Kusumawati on group stage, defeating Lui Chun Wai and Fu Chi Yan from Hong Kong, and on the final match with Siti Fadia Silva Ramadhanti, defeating the home favorite Gao Jiaxuan and Wu Mengying, thus started Indonesia first reign on BAMTC since 2017. He was planned to be paired back with Pitha Haningtyas Mentari at Asia Championships on April.

== Achievements ==
=== SEA Games ===
Mixed doubles
Year	Venue	Partner	Opponent	Score	Result	Ref.
2019	Muntinlupa Sports Complex; Metro Manila, Philippines	(Indonesia) Pitha Haningtyas Mentari	(Malaysia) Goh Soon Huat (Malaysia) Shevon Jemie Lai	21–18, 11–21, 22–24	Bronze	
2021	Bac Giang Gymnasium; Bắc Giang, Vietnam	(Indonesia) Pitha Haningtyas Mentari	(Malaysia) Chen Tang Jie (Malaysia) Peck Yen Wei	22–20, 13–21, 18–21	Bronze	

=== World Junior Championships ===
Boys' doubles
Year	Venue	Partner	Opponent	Score	Result	Ref.
2017	GOR Among Rogo; Yogyakarta, Indonesia	(Indonesia) Yeremia Rambitan	(China) Di Zijian (China) Wang Chang	15–21, 17–21	Bronze	

Mixed doubles
Year	Venue	Partner	Opponent	Score	Result	Ref.
2017	GOR Among Rogo; Yogyakarta, Indonesia	(Indonesia) Pitha Haningtyas Mentari	(Indonesia) Rehan Naufal Kusharjanto (Indonesia) Siti Fadia Silva Ramadhanti	21–23, 21–15, 21–18	Gold	

=== Asian Junior Championships ===
Mixed doubles
Year	Venue	Partner	Opponent	Score	Result	Ref.
2016	CPB Badminton Training Center; Bangkok, Thailand	(Indonesia) Apriyani Rahayu	(South Korea) Kim Won-ho (South Korea) Lee Yu-rim	17–21, 20–22	Bronze	

=== BWF World Tour (3 titles, 5 runners-up) ===
The BWF World Tour, which was announced on 19 March 2017 and implemented in 2018, is a series of elite badminton tournaments sanctioned by the Badminton World Federation (BWF). The BWF World Tour is divided into levels of World Tour Finals, Super 1000, Super 750, Super 500, Super 300, and the BWF Tour Super 100.

Mixed doubles
Year	Tournament	Level	Partner	Opponent	Score	Result	Ref.
2018	Indonesia Masters	Super 100	(Indonesia) Pitha Haningtyas Mentari	(Thailand) Nipitphon Phuangphuapet (Thailand) Savitree Amitrapai	21–19, 21–18	(gold) Winner	
2018	Syed Modi International	Super 300	(Indonesia) Pitha Haningtyas Mentari	(China) Ou Xuanyi (China) Feng Xueying	20–22, 10–21	(silver) Runner-up	
2019	Swiss Open	Super 300	(Indonesia) Pitha Haningtyas Mentari	(Denmark) Mathias Bay-Smidt (Denmark) Rikke Søby Hansen	18–21, 21–12, 16–21	(silver) Runner-up	
2021	Spain Masters	Super 300	(Indonesia) Pitha Haningtyas Mentari	(Denmark) Niclas Nøhr (Denmark) Amalie Magelund	21–18, 21–15	(gold) Winner	
2022	Malaysia Masters	Super 500	(Indonesia) Pitha Haningtyas Mentari	(China) Zheng Siwei (China) Huang Yaqiong	17–21, 12–21	(silver) Runner-up	
2024	Orléans Masters	Super 300	(Indonesia) Pitha Haningtyas Mentari	(China) Cheng Xing (China) Zhang Chi	21–16, 18–21, 15–21	(silver) Runner-up	
2024	Spain Masters	Super 300	(Indonesia) Pitha Haningtyas Mentari	(China) Cheng Xing (China) Zhang Chi	17–21, 21–12, 21–13	(gold) Winner	
2024	Malaysia Masters	Super 500	(Indonesia) Pitha Haningtyas Mentari	(Malaysia) Goh Soon Huat (Malaysia) Shevon Jemie Lai	18–21, 19–21	(silver) Runner-up	

=== BWF International Challenge/Series (1 title) ===
Mixed doubles
Year	Tournament	Partner	Opponent	Score	Result	Ref.
2016	Vietnam International	(Indonesia) Vania Arianti Sukoco	(Indonesia) Andika Ramadiansyah (Indonesia) Angelica Wiratama	21–15, 22–20	(gold) Winner	

BWF International Challenge tournament
BWF International Series tournament

=== BWF Junior International (2 titles, 3 runners-up) ===
Boys' doubles
Year	Tournament	Partner	Opponent	Score	Result	Ref.
2015	Italian Junior	(Indonesia) Andika Ramadiansyah	(Indonesia) Yahya Adi Kumara (Indonesia) Yantoni Edy Saputra	23–21, 16–21, 20–22	(silver) Runner-up	
2016	Indonesia Junior International	(Indonesia) Andika Ramadiansyah	(Indonesia) Muhammad Fachrikar (Indonesia) Bagas Maulana	19–21, 21–14, 18–21	(silver) Runner-up	
2017	India Junior International	(Indonesia) Rehan Naufal Kusharjanto	(Thailand) Pacharapol Nipornram (Thailand) Kunlavut Vitidsarn	21–9, 21–13	(gold) Winner	

Mixed doubles
Year	Tournament	Partner	Opponent	Score	Result	Ref.
2016	Indonesia Junior International	(Indonesia) Apriyani Rahayu	(Indonesia) Andika Ramadiansyah (Indonesia) Vania Arianti Sukoco	21–15, 21–15	(gold) Winner	
2017	India Junior International	(Indonesia) Angelica Wiratama	(Japan) Takuma Obayashi (Japan) Natsu Saito	21–18, 16–21, 17–21	(silver) Runner-up	

BWF Junior International Grand Prix tournament
BWF Junior International Challenge tournament
BWF Junior International Series tournament
BWF Junior Future Series tournament

== Performance timeline ==
Key

W	Won	F	Finalist	SF	Semi-finalist
QF	Quarter-finalist	#R	Rounds 4, 3, 2, 1	RR	Round-robin stage
Q#	Qualification round	A	Absent	w/d	Withdrew
G	Gold	S	Silver	B	Bronze
NH	Not held	N/A	Not applicable	DNQ	Did not qualify

=== National team ===
- Junior level

Team events	2015	2016	2017
Asian Junior Championships	A	QF	S
World Junior Championships	S	5th	5th

- Senior level

Team events	2019	2020	2021	2022	2023	2024	2025	Ref
SEA Games	G	NH	B	NH	A	NH		
Asia Mixed Team Championships	A	NH			QF	NH	G	
Asian Games	NH			QF	NH			
Sudirman Cup	A	NH	QF	NH	QF	NH	B	

=== Individual competitions ===
==== Junior level ====
- Boys' doubles

Events	2015	2016	2017	Ref
Asian Junior Championships	2R	QF	2R	
World Junior Championships	2R	QF	B	

- Mixed doubles

Events	2016	2017	Ref
Asian Junior Championships	B	3R	
World Junior Championships	QF	G	

==== Senior level ====
===== Men's doubles =====
Tournament	BWF Superseries / Grand Prix				BWF World Tour	Best
Tournament	2014	2015	2016	2017	2018	Best
Singapore Open	A				1R	1R ('18)
Vietnam Open	A				1R	1R ('18)
Indonesia Masters Super 100	NH				1R	1R ('18)
Indonesia Masters	1R	1R	A	NH	A	1R ('14, '15)
Year-end ranking	539	373	170	591	409	134
Tournament	2014	2015	2016	2017	2018	Best

===== Mixed doubles =====
Events	2019	2020	2021	2022	2023	2024	2025	Ref
SEA Games	B	NH	B	NH	A	NH		
Asian Championships	2R	NH		QF	QF	2R	QF	
Asian Games	NH			2R	NH			
World Championships	2R	NH	w/d	3R	3R	NH	2R	
Olympic Games	NH	DNQ	NH			RR	NH	

Tournament	BWF Superseries / Grand Prix		BWF World Tour									Best	Ref
Tournament	2016	2017	2018	2019	2020	2021	2022	2023	2024	2025	2026	Best	Ref
Malaysia Open	A			2R	NH		2R	1R	1R	A		2R ('19, '22)	
India Open	A				NH		A	1R	1R	1R	A	1R ('23, '24, '25)	
Indonesia Masters	1R	NH	2R	2R	1R	1R	QF	2R	2R	SF	A	SF ('25)	
Thailand Masters	A				1R	NH		A	1R	1R	A	1R ('20, '24, '25)	
German Open	A			2R	NH		QF	A	2R	A		QF ('22)	
All England Open	A			1R	2R	A	1R	1R	A			2R ('20)	
Swiss Open	A			F	NH	2R	1R	QF	1R	A		F ('19)	
Lingshui China Masters	N/A		QF	A	NH			A				QF ('18)	
Orléans Masters	N/A		A		NH	A		w/d	F	A		F ('24)	
Thailand Open	A			2R	1R	NH	A		SF	A		SF ('24)	
Thailand Open	A			2R	1R	NH	A		SF	A		SF ('24)	
Malaysia Masters	A			1R	1R	NH	F	QF	F	A		F ('22, '24)	
Singapore Open	A		QF	2R	NH		2R	2R	A	1R	A	QF ('18)	
Indonesia Open	A			1R	NH	1R	1R	QF	1R	1R	A	QF ('23)	
Australian Open	A				NH		w/d	QF	A		1R	QF ('23)	
Macau Open	A				NH				A	1R	A	1R ('25)	
Japan Open	A			1R	NH		2R	1R	A			2R ('22)	
China Open	A			2R	NH			2R	A			2R ('19, '23)	
Taipei Open	A		QF	QF	NH		w/d	2R	A			QF ('18, '19)	
Vietnam Open	A		SF	A	NH		A					SF ('18)	
Hong Kong Open	A			1R	NH			QF	A			QF ('23)	
China Masters	A		2R	2R	NH			2R	A			2R ('18, '19, '23)	
Indonesia Masters Super 100	NH		W	A	NH		A					W ('18)	
Korea Open	A		1R	SF	NH		SF	A				SF ('19, '22)	
Arctic Open	N/A				NH			A	QF	A		QF ('24)	
Denmark Open	A			1R	A	2R	1R	1R	QF	A		QF ('24)	
French Open	A			2R	NH	1R	2R	1R	1R	A		2R ('19, '22)	
Hylo Open	A					SF	QF	A				SF ('21)	
Korea Masters	A		2R	A	NH		2R	A				2R ('18, '22)	
Japan Masters	NH							2R	2R	A		2R ('23, '24)	
Syed Modi International	A		F	A	NH		A					F ('18)	
Superseries / World Tour Finals	DNQ						SF	DNQ				SF ('22)	
Akita Masters	NH		SF	A	NH							SF ('18)	
New Zealand Open	A			1R	NH							1R ('19)	
Spain Masters	NH		A	QF	A	W	NH	w/d	W	NH		W ('21, '24)	
Year-end ranking	95	202	28	21	18	22	9	18	18	65		9	
Tournament	2016	2017	2018	2019	2020	2021	2022	2023	2024	2025	2026	Best	Ref
