= 2022 Indonesia Open =

Tournament details
- Dates: 14–19 June
- Level: Super 1000
- Total prize money: US$1,200,000
- Venue: Istora Gelora Bung Karno
- Location: Jakarta, Indonesia

Champions
- Men's singles: (Denmark) Viktor Axelsen
- Women's singles: (Chinese Taipei) Tai Tzu-ying
- Men's doubles: (China) Liu Yuchen (China) Ou Xuanyi
- Women's doubles: (Japan) Nami Matsuyama (Japan) Chiharu Shida
- Mixed doubles: (China) Zheng Siwei (China) Huang Yaqiong

The 2022 Indonesia Open (officially known as the East Ventures Indonesia Open 2022 for sponsorship reasons) was a badminton tournament which took place at the Istora Gelora Bung Karno in Jakarta, Indonesia, from 14 to 19 June 2022. It had a total prize of US$1,200,000.

The host country Indonesia failed to send any representatives in the tournament's semi-finals for the first time ever.

== Tournament ==
The 2022 Indonesia Open was one of the tournaments in 2022 BWF World Tour. It was a part of the Indonesia Open which had been held since 1982 and was organized by the Badminton Association of Indonesia with sanction from BWF.

=== Venue ===
This international tournament was held at the Istora Gelora Bung Karno inside the Gelora Bung Karno Sports Complex in Central Jakarta, Jakarta, Indonesia.

=== Point distribution ===
Below is the point distribution table for each phase of the tournament based on the BWF points system for the BWF World Tour Super 1000 event.

Winner	Runner-up	3/4	5/8	9/16	17/32
12,000	10,200	8,400	6,600	4,800	3,000

=== Prize money ===
The total prize money for this tournament was US$1,200,000. The distribution of the prize money was in accordance with BWF regulations.

Event	Winner	Finalist	Semi-finals	Quarter-finals	Last 16	Last 32
Singles	$84,000	$40,800	$16,800	$6,600	$3,600	$1,200
Doubles	$88,800	$42,000	$16,800	$7,500	$3,900	$1,200

== Men's singles ==
=== Seeds ===
1. (Denmark) Viktor Axelsen (champion)
2. (Japan) Kento Momota (first round)
3. (Denmark) Anders Antonsen (withdrew)
4. (Chinese Taipei) Chou Tien-chen (second round)
5. (Indonesia) Anthony Sinisuka Ginting (quarter-finals)
6. (Malaysia) Lee Zii Jia (semi-finals)
7. (Indonesia) Jonatan Christie (second round)
8. (India) Lakshya Sen (first round)

=== Finals ===
Semi-finals
1	(Denmark) Viktor Axelsen	19	21	23
6	(Malaysia) Lee Zii Jia	21	11	21
(China) Zhao Junpeng	21	21
(India) Prannoy H. S.	16	15

Final
1	(Denmark) Viktor Axelsen	21	21
(China) Zhao Junpeng	9	10

=== Top half ===
==== Section 1 ====
First round
1	(Denmark) V Axelsen	21	21
(Japan) K Tsuneyama	8	4
(China) Lu GZ	21	21
(Japan) K Nishimoto	18	13
5	(Indonesia) A S Ginting	21	22
(Indonesia) T Sugiarto	17	20
(Denmark) H-K Vittinghus	21	21
(India) B. Sai Praneeth	16	19

Second round
1	(Denmark) V Axelsen	21	21
(China) Lu GZ	17	9
5	(Indonesia) A S Ginting	21	21
(Denmark) H-K Vittinghus	17	9

Quarter-finals
1	(Denmark) V Axelsen	21	19	21
5	(Indonesia) A S Ginting	13	21	9

==== Section 2 ====
First round
PFR	(Republic of Ireland) N Nguyen	15	15
(France) T J Popov	21	21
(Singapore) Loh K Y	21	23
(South Korea) Heo K-h	12	21
6	(Malaysia) Lee Z J	21	21
(Thailand) S Thammasin	15	14
PFR	(France) T Rouxel	19	15
(India) S Verma	21	21

Second round
(France) T J Popov	16	9
(Singapore) Loh K Y	21	21
6	(Malaysia) Lee Z J	21	21
(India) S Verma	10	13

Quarter-finals
(Singapore) Loh K Y	18	21	20
6	(Malaysia) Lee Z J	21	16	22

=== Bottom half ===
==== Section 3 ====
First round
(Netherlands) M Caljouw	11	11
(China) Zhao JP	21	21
(Thailand) K Wangcharoen	20	8
7	(Indonesia) J Christie	22	21
(Hong Kong) Lee C Y	21	21
(Malaysia) Liew D	19	18
(Thailand) K Vitidsarn	20	21	12
4	(Chinese Taipei) Chou T-c	22	19	21

Second round
(China) Zhao JP	21	18	21
7	(Indonesia) J Christie	12	21	14
(Hong Kong) Lee C Y	21	21
4	(Chinese Taipei) Chou T-c	18	13

Quarter-finals
(China) Zhao JP	21	17	21
(Hong Kong) Lee C Y	14	21	11

==== Section 4 ====
First round
(Indonesia) S H Rhustavito	17	21	16
(Hong Kong) Ng K L	21	11	21
(India) Prannoy H. S.	21	21
8	(India) L Sen	10	9
PFR	(France) B Leverdez	23	21
(India) S Kidambi	21	10
(Denmark) R Gemke	21	19	21
2	(Japan) K Momota	19	21	14

Second round
(Hong Kong) Ng K L	11	18
(India) Prannoy H. S.	21	21
PFR	(France) B Leverdez	12	15
(Denmark) R Gemke	21	21

Quarter-finals
(India) Prannoy H. S.	21	21
(Denmark) R Gemke	14	12

== Women's singles ==
=== Seeds ===
1. (Japan) Akane Yamaguchi (quarter-finals)
2. (Chinese Taipei) Tai Tzu-ying (champion)
3. (South Korea) An Se-young (quarter-finals)
4. (China) Chen Yufei (semi-finals)
5. (Spain) Carolina Marín (second round)
6. (Japan) Nozomi Okuhara (quarter-finals)
7. (India) P. V. Sindhu (first round)
8. (Thailand) Ratchanok Intanon (second round)

=== Finals ===
Semi-finals
(China) Wang Zhiyi	21	21
(China) He Bingjiao	15	10
4	(China) Chen Yufei	21	24	12
2	(Chinese Taipei) Tai Tzu-ying	10	26	21

Final
(China) Wang Zhiyi	23	6	15
2	(Chinese Taipei) Tai Tzu-ying	21	21	21

=== Top half ===
==== Section 1 ====
First round
1	(Japan) A Yamaguchi	21	21
(Denmark) M Blichfeldt	15	18
(Japan) S Takahashi	21	21
(United States) BW Zhang	16	14
5	(Spain) C Marín	21	21
PFR	(Denmark) J D Jakobsen	17	17
(Canada) M Li	5	12
(China) Wang ZY	21	21

Second round
1	(Japan) A Yamaguchi	21	5
(Japan) S Takahashi	11	1^{r}
5	(Spain) C Marín	17	18
(China) Wang ZY	21	21

Quarter-finals
1	(Japan) A Yamaguchi	19	14
(China) Wang ZY	21	21

==== Section 2 ====
First round
3	(South Korea) An S-y	21	21
(Turkey) N Yiğit	13	10
(Denmark) L Christophersen	21	16	19
(Scotland) K Gilmour	17	21	21
7	(India) P. V. Sindhu	14	18
(China) He BJ	21	21
(China) Han Y	15	21	20
(Thailand) B Ongbamrungphan	21	12	22

Second round
3	(South Korea) An S-y	21	21
(Scotland) K Gilmour	14	11
(China) He BJ	21	21
(Thailand) B Ongbamrungphan	9	9

Quarter-finals
3	(South Korea) An S-y	21	17	14
(China) He BJ	15	21	21

=== Bottom half ===
==== Section 3 ====
First round
(Indonesia) G M Tunjung	17	21	12
(Thailand) P Chaiwan	21	10	21
(Chinese Taipei) Pai Y-p	14	18
6	(Japan) N Okuhara	21	21
(Thailand) S Katethong	6^{r}
(China) Zhang YM	13
(South Korea) Kim G-e	10	17
4	(China) Chen YF	21	21

Second round
(Thailand) P Chaiwan	16	8
6	(Japan) N Okuhara	21	21
(China) Zhang YM	10	21	12
4	(China) Chen YF	21	15	21

Quarter-finals
6	(Japan) N Okuhara	16	10
4	(China) Chen YF	21	21

==== Section 4 ====
First round
(Belgium) L Tan	16	8
(Denmark) L Kjærsfeldt	21	21
(Thailand) P Chochuwong	17	17
8	(Thailand) R Intanon	21	21
(Germany) Y Li	9	15
(United States) I Wang	21	21
(Singapore) Yeo J M	14	14
2	(Chinese Taipei) Tai T-y	21	21

Second round
(Denmark) L Kjærsfeldt	15	21	22
8	(Thailand) R Intanon	21	16	20
(United States) I Wang	21	16	9
2	(Chinese Taipei) Tai T-y	15	21	21

Quarter-finals
(Denmark) L Kjærsfeldt	13	13
2	(Chinese Taipei) Tai T-y	21	21

== Men's doubles ==
=== Seeds ===
1. (Indonesia) Marcus Fernaldi Gideon / Kevin Sanjaya Sukamuljo (second round)
2. (Indonesia) Mohammad Ahsan / Hendra Setiawan (first round)
3. (Japan) Takuro Hoki / Yugo Kobayashi (quarter-finals)
4. (Chinese Taipei) Lee Yang / Wang Chi-lin (second round)
5. (Malaysia) Aaron Chia / Soh Wooi Yik (semi-finals)
6. (Indonesia) Fajar Alfian / Muhammad Rian Ardianto (quarter-finals)
7. (India) Satwiksairaj Rankireddy / Chirag Shetty (withdrew)
8. (Denmark) Kim Astrup / Anders Skaarup Rasmussen (semi-finals)

=== Finals ===
Semi-finals
(South Korea) Choi Sol-gyu (South Korea) Kim Won-ho	13	21	21
8	(Denmark) Kim Astrup (Denmark) Anders Skaarup Rasmussen	21	12	18
5	(Malaysia) Aaron Chia (Malaysia) Soh Wooi Yik	18	13
PFR	(China) Liu Yuchen (China) Ou Xuanyi	21	21

Final
(South Korea) Choi Sol-gyu (South Korea) Kim Won-ho	17	21
PFR	(China) Liu Yuchen (China) Ou Xuanyi	21	23

=== Top half ===
==== Section 1 ====
First round
1	(Indonesia) M F Gideon (Indonesia) K S Sukamuljo	21	21
(Indonesia) W Nayaka (Indonesia) A Y Santoso	19	16
(South Korea) Kang M-h (South Korea) Seo S-j	21	21
(Indonesia) S K Gutama (Indonesia) M R P Isfahani	13	11
PFR	(Scotland) C Grimley (Scotland) M Grimley	18	19
(South Korea) Choi S-g (South Korea) Kim W-h	21	21
(Japan) A Koga (Japan) T Saito	21	22
(Germany) M Lamsfuß (Germany) M Seidel	18	20

Second round
1	(Indonesia) M F Gideon (Indonesia) K S Sukamuljo	14	12
(South Korea) Kang M-h (South Korea) Seo S-j	21	21
(South Korea) Choi S-g (South Korea) Kim W-h	21	21
(Japan) A Koga (Japan) T Saito	12	18

Quarter-finals
(South Korea) Kang M-h (South Korea) Seo S-j	21	13	18
(South Korea) Choi S-g (South Korea) Kim W-h	16	21	21

==== Section 2 ====
First round
3	(Japan) T Hoki (Japan) Y Kobayashi	21	21
(India) M Attri (India) B. S Reddy	8	11
(Denmark) J Bay (Denmark) L Mølhede	14	14
(Malaysia) Ong Y S (Malaysia) Teo E Y	21	21
8	(Denmark) K Astrup (Denmark) A S Rasmussen	21	21
(Chinese Taipei) Lu C-y (Chinese Taipei) Yang P-h	15	16
(France) F Delrue (France) W Villeger	16	17
(Indonesia) L R Carnando (Indonesia) D Marthin	21	21

Second round
3	(Japan) T Hoki (Japan) Y Kobayashi	21	14	21
(Malaysia) Ong Y S (Malaysia) Teo E Y	11	21	19
8	(Denmark) K Astrup (Denmark) A S Rasmussen	21	16	21
(Indonesia) L R Carnando (Indonesia) D Marthin	18	21	15

Quarter-finals
3	(Japan) T Hoki (Japan) Y Kobayashi	17	21	14
8	(Denmark) K Astrup (Denmark) A S Rasmussen	21	16	21

=== Bottom half ===
==== Section 3 ====
First round
(France) C Popov (France) T J Popov	21	17	15
(Netherlands) R Jille (Netherlands) T van der Lecq	18	21	21
PFR	(South Korea) Kim G-j (South Korea) Kim S-r	18	21	11
5	(Malaysia) A Chia (Malaysia) Soh W Y	21	11	21
(England) B Lane (England) S Vendy	19	15
(Indonesia) P Kusumawardana (Indonesia) Y Rambitan	21	21
(Thailand) S Jomkoh (Thailand) K Kedren	13	15
4	(Chinese Taipei) Lee Y (Chinese Taipei) Wang C-l	21	21

Second round
(Netherlands) R Jille (Netherlands) T van der Lecq	17	21	6
5	(Malaysia) A Chia (Malaysia) Soh W Y	21	16	21
(Indonesia) P Kusumawardana (Indonesia) Y Rambitan	21	17	21
4	(Chinese Taipei) Lee Y (Chinese Taipei) Wang C-l	16	21	14

Quarter-finals
5	(Malaysia) A Chia (Malaysia) Soh W Y	14	21	22
(Indonesia) P Kusumawardana (Indonesia) Y Rambitan	21	12	20

==== Section 4 ====
First round
(Indonesia) M S Fikri (Indonesia) B Maulana	21	21
(Scotland) A Dunn (Scotland) A Hall	16	16
(Malaysia) Goh S F (Malaysia) N Izzuddin	19	14
6	(Indonesia) F Alfian (Indonesia) M R Ardianto	21	21
(India) Arjun M.R. (India) D Kapila	27	18	21
(Japan) K Matsui (Japan) Y Takeuchi	25	21	19
PFR	(China) Liu YC (China) Ou XY	21	24
2	(Indonesia) M Ahsan (Indonesia) H Setiawan	17	22

Second round
(Indonesia) M S Fikri (Indonesia) B Maulana	10	21	15
6	(Indonesia) F Alfian (Indonesia) M R Ardianto	21	10	21
(India) Arjun M.R. (India) D Kapila	19	15
PFR	(China) Liu YC (China) Ou XY	21	21

Quarter-finals
6	(Indonesia) F Alfian (Indonesia) M R Ardianto	18	18
PFR	(China) Liu YC (China) Ou XY	21	21

== Women's doubles ==
=== Seeds ===
1. (China) Chen Qingchen / Jia Yifan (quarter-finals)
2. (South Korea) Lee So-hee / Shin Seung-chan (semi-finals)
3. (South Korea) Kim So-yeong / Kong Hee-yong (withdrew)
4. (Japan) Yuki Fukushima / Sayaka Hirota (final)
5. (Japan) Mayu Matsumoto / Wakana Nagahara (first round)
6. (Japan) Nami Matsuyama / Chiharu Shida (champions)
7. (Thailand) Jongkolphan Kititharakul / Rawinda Prajongjai (semi-finals)
8. (Bulgaria) Gabriela Stoeva / Stefani Stoeva (second round)

=== Finals ===
Semi-finals
7	(Thailand) Jongkolphan Kititharakul (Thailand) Rawinda Prajongjai	15	14
6	(Japan) Nami Matsuyama (Japan) Chiharu Shida	21	21
4	(Japan) Yuki Fukushima (Japan) Sayaka Hirota	9	21	21
2	(South Korea) Lee So-hee (South Korea) Shin Seung-chan	21	14	18

Final
6	(Japan) Nami Matsuyama (Japan) Chiharu Shida	18	21	21
4	(Japan) Yuki Fukushima (Japan) Sayaka Hirota	21	14	17

=== Top half ===
==== Section 1 ====
First round
1	(China) Chen QC (China) Jia YF	21	20	23
(South Korea) Baek H-n (South Korea) Lee Y-r	14	22	21
(India) S Gurazada (United States) I Jaiswal	15	8
(India) A Ponnappa (India) N. S Reddy	21	21
7	(Thailand) J Kititharakul (Thailand) R Prajongjai	21	16	21
(Canada) R Honderich (Canada) K Tsai	18	21	12
(Netherlands) D Jille (Netherlands) C Seinen	21	21
PFR	(Ukraine) M Stoliarenko (Ukraine) Y Zharka	16	10

Second round
1	(China) Chen QC (China) Jia YF	21	21
(India) A Ponnappa (India) N. S Reddy	16	13
7	(Thailand) J Kititharakul (Thailand) R Prajongjai	21	21
(Netherlands) D Jille (Netherlands) C Seinen	12	12

Quarter-finals
1	(China) Chen QC (China) Jia YF	19	15
7	(Thailand) J Kititharakul (Thailand) R Prajongjai	21	21

==== Section 2 ====
First round
PFR	(Malaysia) Low Y Y (Malaysia) V Siow	10	14
(China) Du Y (China) Li WM	21	21
(Malaysia) V Hoo (Malaysia) Lim C S	21	21
(Brazil) J Lima (Brazil) S Lima	10	5
6	(Japan) N Matsuyama (Japan) C Shida	21	24
(Denmark) J Finne-Ipsen (Denmark) M Surrow	14	22
(China) Liu XX (China) Xia YT	21	21
(Scotland) J MacPherson (Scotland) C Torrance	10	8

Second round
(China) Du Y (China) Li WM	21	13	21
(Malaysia) V Hoo (Malaysia) Lim C S	10	21	9
6	(Japan) N Matsuyama (Japan) C Shida	21	21
(China) Liu XX (China) Xia YT	17	15

Quarter-finals
(China) Du Y (China) Li WM	14	20
6	(Japan) N Matsuyama (Japan) C Shida	21	22

=== Bottom half ===
==== Section 3 ====
First round
(India) H M Harinarayanan (India) A Roy	9	8
(South Korea) Jeong N-e (South Korea) Kim H-j	21	21
(Japan) R Iwanaga (Japan) K Nakanishi
8	(Bulgaria) G Stoeva (Bulgaria) S Stoeva	w	/	o
(Malaysia) A Cheong (Malaysia) Teoh M X	12	16
(Malaysia) P Tan (Malaysia) Thinaah M	21	21
(Thailand) B Aimsaard (Thailand) N Aimsaard	14	15
4	(Japan) Y Fukushima (Japan) S Hirota	21	21

Second round
(South Korea) Jeong N-e (South Korea) Kim H-j	18	21	21
8	(Bulgaria) G Stoeva (Bulgaria) S Stoeva	21	12	15
(Malaysia) P Tan (Malaysia) Thinaah M	19	12
4	(Japan) Y Fukushima (Japan) S Hirota	21	21

Quarter-finals
(South Korea) Jeong N-e (South Korea) Kim H-j	18	9
4	(Japan) Y Fukushima (Japan) S Hirota	21	21

==== Section 4 ====
First round
(India) K. A Bhat (India) S Gautam	9	10
(China) Zhang SX (China) Zheng Y	21	21
(Indonesia) A Rahayu (Indonesia) S F S Ramadhanti	21	17	21
5	(Japan) M Matsumoto (Japan) W Nagahara	7	21	17
(France) M Lambert (France) A Tran	19	21	15
PFR	(Indonesia) F D Kusuma (Indonesia) A C Pratiwi	21	17	21
(Indonesia) F V D Gani (Indonesia) R Sugiarto	16	20
2	(South Korea) Lee S-h (South Korea) Shin S-c	21	22

Second round
(China) Zhang SX (China) Zheng Y	16	21	18
(Indonesia) A Rahayu (Indonesia) S F S Ramadhanti	21	16	21
PFR	(Indonesia) F D Kusuma (Indonesia) A C Pratiwi	23	11
2	(South Korea) Lee S-h (South Korea) Shin S-c	25	21

Quarter-finals
(Indonesia) A Rahayu (Indonesia) S F S Ramadhanti	14	19
2	(South Korea) Lee S-h (South Korea) Shin S-c	21	21

== Mixed doubles ==
=== Seeds ===
1. (Thailand) Dechapol Puavaranukroh / Sapsiree Taerattanachai (first round)
2. (China) Zheng Siwei / Huang Yaqiong (champions)
3. (Japan) Yuta Watanabe / Arisa Higashino (final)
4. (China) Wang Yilyu / Huang Dongping (semi-finals)
5. (Indonesia) Praveen Jordan / Melati Daeva Oktavianti (second round)
6. (South Korea) Seo Seung-jae / Chae Yoo-jung (semi-finals)
7. (Hong Kong) Tang Chun Man / Tse Ying Suet (withdrew)
8. (Malaysia) Tan Kian Meng / Lai Pei Jing (first round)

=== Finals ===
Semi-finals
6	(South Korea) Seo Seung-jae (South Korea) Chae Yoo-jung	18	21	15
3	(Japan) Yuta Watanabe (Japan) Arisa Higashino	21	17	21
4	(China) Wang Yilyu (China) Huang Dongping	6	14
2	(China) Zheng Siwei (China) Huang Yaqiong	21	21

Final
3	(Japan) Yuta Watanabe (Japan) Arisa Higashino	14	16
2	(China) Zheng Siwei (China) Huang Yaqiong	21	21

=== Top half ===
==== Section 1 ====
First round
1	(Thailand) D Puavaranukroh (Thailand) S Taerattanachai	18	21	20
(Malaysia) Goh S H (Malaysia) S J Lai	21	7	22
(Malaysia) Hoo P R (Malaysia) Toh E W	21	21
(Japan) Y Kaneko (Japan) M Matsutomo	14	19
6	(South Korea) Seo S-j (South Korea) Chae Y-j	21	21
(Indonesia) R Rivaldy (Indonesia) P H Mentari	19	11
(Hong Kong) Chang T C (Hong Kong) Ng W Y	21	21
(India) I Bhatnagar (India) T Crasto	14	11

Second round
(Malaysia) Goh S H (Malaysia) S J Lai	19	19
(Malaysia) Hoo P R (Malaysia) Toh E W	21	21
6	(South Korea) Seo S-j (South Korea) Chae Y-j	21	28
(Hong Kong) Chang T C (Hong Kong) Ng W Y	19	26

Quarter-finals
(Malaysia) Hoo P R (Malaysia) Toh E W	16	17
6	(South Korea) Seo S-j (South Korea) Chae Y-j	21	21

==== Section 2 ====
First round
3	(Japan) Y Watanabe (Japan) A Higashino	27	21	21
(Netherlands) R Tabeling (Netherlands) S Piek	25	23	15
(Malaysia) Soong J V (Malaysia) Goh L Y	21	22
(Indonesia) H Faizal (Indonesia) S Kani	13	20
PFR	(Brazil) F Farias (Brazil) J Lima	13	8
(France) T Gicquel (France) D Delrue	21	21
(Indonesia) R N Kusharjanto (Indonesia) L A Kusumawati	13	21	17
(Germany) M Lamsfuß (Germany) I Lohau	21	16	21

Second round
3	(Japan) Y Watanabe (Japan) A Higashino	21	21
(Malaysia) Soong J V (Malaysia) Goh L Y	17	12
(France) T Gicquel (France) D Delrue	22	21	21
(Germany) M Lamsfuß (Germany) I Lohau	20	23	11

Quarter-finals
3	(Japan) Y Watanabe (Japan) A Higashino	22	21	21
(France) T Gicquel (France) D Delrue	24	11	13

=== Bottom half ===
==== Section 3 ====
First round
PFR	(Malaysia) Choong H J (Malaysia) Peck Y W	17	14
(Malaysia) Chen T J (Malaysia) V Siow	21	21
(Scotland) A Hall (Scotland) J MacPherson	6	18
5	(Indonesia) P Jordan (Indonesia) M D Oktavianti	21	21
(England) M Ellis (England) L Smith	15	16
(Malaysia) Chan P S (Malaysia) Cheah Y S	21	21
(Singapore) T Hee (Singapore) Tan W H	21	19	24
4	(China) Wang YL (China) Huang DP	13	21	26

Second round
(Malaysia) Chen T J (Malaysia) V Siow	w	/	o
5	(Indonesia) P Jordan (Indonesia) M D Oktavianti
(Malaysia) Chan P S (Malaysia) Cheah Y S	11	14
4	(China) Wang YL (China) Huang DP	21	21

Quarter-finals
(Malaysia) Chen T J (Malaysia) V Siow	12	14
4	(China) Wang YL (China) Huang DP	21	21

==== Section 4 ====
First round
(South Korea) Ko S-h (South Korea) Eom H-w	21	19	21
(Japan) K Yamashita (Japan) N Shinoya	14	21	16
(Denmark) M Christiansen (Denmark) A Bøje	21	21
8	(Malaysia) Tan K M (Malaysia) Lai P J	15	16
(Thailand) S Jomkoh (Thailand) S Paewsampran	21	13	21
(South Korea) Kim W-h (South Korea) Jeong N-e	17	21	15
(China) Guo XW (China) Zhang SX	17	19
2	(China) Zheng SW (China) Huang YQ	21	21

Second round
(South Korea) Ko S-h (South Korea) Eom H-w	15	21	17
(Denmark) M Christiansen (Denmark) A Bøje	21	17	21
(Thailand) S Jomkoh (Thailand) S Paewsampran	15	16
2	(China) Zheng SW (China) Huang YQ	21	21

Quarter-finals
(Denmark) M Christiansen (Denmark) A Bøje	18	21	17
2	(China) Zheng SW (China) Huang YQ	21	14	21

Preceded by 2022 Indonesia Masters	BWF World Tour; 2022 BWF season	Succeeded by 2022 Malaysia Open
