= Badminton at the 2021 SEA Games – Individual event =

Tournament details
- Dates: 19–22 May 2022
- Venue: Bắc Giang Gymnasium
- Location: Bắc Giang, Vietnam

Champions
- Men's singles: (Thailand) Kunlavut Vitidsarn
- Women's singles: (Thailand) Pornpawee Chochuwong
- Men's doubles: (Indonesia) Leo Rolly Carnando (Indonesia) Daniel Marthin
- Women's doubles: (Indonesia) Apriyani Rahayu (Indonesia) Siti Fadia Silva Ramadhanti
- Mixed doubles: (Malaysia) Chen Tang Jie (Malaysia) Peck Yen Wei

The individual events for badminton at the 2021 SEA Games will be held from 19 to 22 May 2022 at the Bac Giang Gymnasium, Bắc Giang, Vietnam. It will be contesting 5 events: the men's singles, women's singles, men's doubles, women's doubles and mixed doubles.

== Men's singles ==
=== Seeds ===
1. (Singapore) Loh Kean Yew (silver medalist)
2. (Thailand) Kunlavut Vitidsarn (gold medalist)
3. (Indonesia) Chico Aura Dwi Wardoyo (quarter-finals)
4. (Thailand) Khosit Phetpradab (quarter-finals)

=== Draw ===
First round
1	(Singapore) Loh Kean Yew	18	21	21
(Malaysia) Kok Jing Hong	21	15	11
(Cambodia) Heng Meng Ly	14	7
(Philippines) Jewel Albo	21	21
4	(Thailand) Khosit Phetpradab	21	21
(Laos) Vixunnalath Phichith	15	12
(Vietnam) Nguyễn Tiến Minh	21	21
(Indonesia) Christian Adinata	12	19
(Singapore) Jason Teh	21	21
(Philippines) Ros Pedrosa	16	6
(Cambodia) Sok Rikreay	10	12
3	(Indonesia) Chico Aura Dwi Wardoyo	21	21
(Malaysia) Lee Shun Yang	21	21
(Laos) Phonesack Sokthavy	5	4
(Vietnam) Lê Đức Phát	12	19
2	(Thailand) Kunlavut Vitidsarn	21	21

Quarter-final
1	(Singapore) Loh Kean Yew	21	21
(Philippines) Jewel Albo	7	8
4	(Thailand) Khosit Phetpradab	1^{r}
(Vietnam) Nguyễn Tiến Minh	17
(Singapore) Jason Teh	21	21
3	(Indonesia) Chico Aura Dwi Wardoyo	16	16
(Malaysia) Lee Shun Yang	11	11
2	(Thailand) Kunlavut Vitidsarn	21	21

Semi-final
1	(Singapore) Loh Kean Yew	21	10	23
(Vietnam) Nguyễn Tiến Minh	15	21	21
(Singapore) Jason Teh	11	12
2	(Thailand) Kunlavut Vitidsarn	21	21

Final
1	(Singapore) Loh Kean Yew	13	13
2	(Thailand) Kunlavut Vitidsarn	21	21

== Women's singles ==
=== Seeds ===
1. (Thailand) Pornpawee Chochuwong (gold medalist)
2. (Singapore) Yeo Jia Min (quarter-finals)

=== Draw ===
First round
(Singapore) Jaslyn Hooi	19	11
(Malaysia) Siti Nurshuhaini	21	21
(Cambodia) Sok Somalyta	0	3
(Philippines) Sarah Barredo	21	21
(Vietnam) Nguyễn Thùy Linh	9	17
(Indonesia) Putri Kusuma Wardani	21	21
(Philippines) Mikaela de Guzman	21	21
(Malaysia) Loh Zhi Wei	14	17
(Vietnam) Vũ Thị Trang	21	5	14
(Indonesia) Gregoria Mariska Tunjung	17	21	21
(Cambodia) Phon Chenda	3	8
(Thailand) Phittayaporn Chaiwan	21	21

Quarter-final
1	(Thailand) Pornpawee Chochuwong	21	21
(Malaysia) Siti Nurshuhaini	17	8
(Philippines) Sarah Barredo	11	9
(Indonesia) Putri Kusuma Wardani	21	21
(Philippines) Mikaela de Guzman	9	7
(Indonesia) Gregoria Mariska Tunjung	21	21
(Thailand) Phittayaporn Chaiwan	21	21
2	(Singapore) Yeo Jia Min	12	16

Semi-final
1	(Thailand) Pornpawee Chochuwong	21	21
(Indonesia) Putri Kusuma Wardani	16	9
(Indonesia) Gregoria Mariska Tunjung	18	15
(Thailand) Phittayaporn Chaiwan	21	21

Final
1	(Thailand) Pornpawee Chochuwong	21	21
(Thailand) Phittayaporn Chaiwan	14	16

== Men's doubles ==
=== Seeds ===
1. (Indonesia) Pramudya Kusumawardana / Yeremia Rambitan (silver medalist)
2. (Indonesia) Leo Rolly Carnando / Daniel Marthin (gold medalist)
3. (Malaysia) Man Wei Chong / Tee Kai Wun (withdrew)
4. (Singapore) Terry Hee / Loh Kean Hean (bronze medalist)

=== Draw ===
First round
1	(Indonesia) Pramudya Kusumawardana (Indonesia) Yeremia Rambitan	21	17	21
(Malaysia) Junaidi Arif (Malaysia) Muhammad Haikal	13	21	14
(Vietnam) Nguyễn Đinh Hoàng (Vietnam) Trần Đình Mạnh	23	15
(Philippines) Solomon Padiz Jr. (Philippines) Julius Villabrille	25	21
4	(Singapore) Terry Hee (Singapore) Loh Kean Hean	21	21
(Cambodia) Sorn Liza (Cambodia) Phal Risatsya	6	13
(Thailand) Peeratchai Sukphun (Thailand) Pakkapon Teeraratsakul	21	21
(Laos) Namboun Luangamath (Laos) Daomixay Vorlasing	16	16
(Cambodia) Heng Mengleap (Cambodia) Yam Samnang	14	6
(Philippines) Christian Bernardo (Philippines) Paul Pantig	21	21
(Vietnam) Đỗ Tuấn Đức (Vietnam) Phạm Hồng Nam	w	/	o
3	(Malaysia) Man Wei Chong (Malaysia) Tee Kai Wun
(Singapore) Danny Bawa Chrisnanta (Singapore) Andy Kwek	14	21
(Thailand) Chaloempon Charoenkitamorn (Thailand) Nanthakarn Yordphaisong	21	23
(Laos) Vixunnalath Phichith (Laos) Bounpaseuth Vanthanouvong	9	13
2	(Indonesia) Leo Rolly Carnando (Indonesia) Daniel Marthin	21	21

Quarter-final
1	(Indonesia) Pramudya Kusumawardana (Indonesia) Yeremia Rambitan	21	21
(Philippines) Solomon Padiz Jr. (Philippines) Julius Villabrille	17	14
4	(Singapore) Terry Hee (Singapore) Loh Kean Hean	21	21
(Thailand) Peeratchai Sukphun (Thailand) Pakkapon Teeraratsakul	18	13
(Philippines) Christian Bernardo (Philippines) Paul Pantig	10	17
(Vietnam) Đỗ Tuấn Đức (Vietnam) Phạm Hồng Nam	21	21
(Thailand) Chaloempon Charoenkitamorn (Thailand) Nanthakarn Yordphaisong	15	21	15
2	(Indonesia) Leo Rolly Carnando (Indonesia) Daniel Marthin	21	17	21

Semi-final
1	(Indonesia) Pramudya Kusumawardana (Indonesia) Yeremia Rambitan	15	21	21
4	(Singapore) Terry Hee (Singapore) Loh Kean Hean	21	17	19
(Vietnam) Đỗ Tuấn Đức (Vietnam) Phạm Hồng Nam	20	16
2	(Indonesia) Leo Rolly Carnando (Indonesia) Daniel Marthin	22	21

Final
1	(Indonesia) Pramudya Kusumawardana (Indonesia) Yeremia Rambitan	17	19
2	(Indonesia) Leo Rolly Carnando (Indonesia) Daniel Marthin	21	21

== Women's doubles ==
=== Seeds ===
1. (Thailand) Jongkolphan Kititharakul / Rawinda Prajongjai (quarter-finals)
2. (Thailand) Benyapa Aimsaard / Nuntakarn Aimsaard (silver medalist)

=== Draw ===
First round
(Indonesia) Apriyani Rahayu (Indonesia) Siti Fadia Silva Ramadhanti	21	21
(Vietnam) Đinh Thị Phương Hồng (Vietnam) Đỗ Thị Hoài	15	15
(Philippines) Eleanor Inlayo (Philippines) Susmita Ramos	21	21
(Laos) Vilakone Kommanivanh (Laos) Thidachane Sypaseuth	10	12
(Singapore) Insyirah Khan (Singapore) Bernice Lim	10	21	21
(Malaysia) Go Pei Kee (Malaysia) Yap Ling	21	14	18
(Vietnam) Phạm Thị Khánh (Vietnam) Thân Vân Anh	17	21	14
(Malaysia) Cheah Yee See (Malaysia) Cheng Su Hui	21	13	21
(Cambodia) Phon Chenda (Cambodia) Sok Somalyta	11	9
(Philippines) Nicole Albo (Philippines) Thea Pomar	21	21
(Indonesia) Febby Valencia Dwijayanti Gani (Indonesia) Ribka Sugiarto	21	21
(Singapore) Jin Yujia (Singapore) Crystal Wong	17	18

Quarter-final
1	(Thailand) Jongkolphan Kititharakul (Thailand) Rawinda Prajongjai	15	20
(Indonesia) Apriyani Rahayu (Indonesia) Siti Fadia Silva Ramadhanti	21	22
(Philippines) Eleanor Inlayo (Philippines) Susmita Ramos	15	19
(Singapore) Insyirah Khan (Singapore) Bernice Lim	21	21
(Malaysia) Cheah Yee See (Malaysia) Cheng Su Hui	21	21
(Philippines) Nicole Albo (Philippines) Thea Pomar	13	11
(Indonesia) Febby Valencia Dwijayanti Gani (Indonesia) Ribka Sugiarto	17	20
2	(Thailand) Benyapa Aimsaard (Thailand) Nuntakarn Aimsaard	21	22

Semi-final
(Indonesia) Apriyani Rahayu (Indonesia) Siti Fadia Silva Ramadhanti	21	21
(Singapore) Insyirah Khan (Singapore) Bernice Lim	10	7
(Malaysia) Cheah Yee See (Malaysia) Cheng Su Hui	16	6
2	(Thailand) Benyapa Aimsaard (Thailand) Nuntakarn Aimsaard	21	21

Final
(Indonesia) Apriyani Rahayu (Indonesia) Siti Fadia Silva Ramadhanti	21	21
2	(Thailand) Benyapa Aimsaard (Thailand) Nuntakarn Aimsaard	17	14

== Mixed doubles ==
=== Seeds ===
1. (Indonesia) Rinov Rivaldy / Pitha Haningtyas Mentari (bronze medalist)
2. (Malaysia) Hoo Pang Ron / Cheah Yee See (silver medalist)
3. (Indonesia) Adnan Maulana / Mychelle Crhystine Bandaso (bronze medalist)
4. (Malaysia) Chen Tang Jie / Peck Yen Wei (gold medalist)

=== Draw ===
First round
1	(Indonesia) Rinov Rivaldy (Indonesia) Pitha Haningtyas Mentari	21	19	21
(Philippines) Alvin Morada (Philippines) Thea Pomar	15	21	15
(Laos) Bounpaseuth Vanthanouvong (Laos) Thidachane Sypaseuth	10	12
(Thailand) Panitchaphon Teeraratsakul (Thailand) Phataimas Muenwong	21	21
4	(Malaysia) Chen Tang Jie (Malaysia) Peck Yen Wei	21	21
(Cambodia) Vannthoun Vath (Cambodia) Sok Somalyta	5	9
(Singapore) Terry Hee (Singapore) Tan Wei Han	21	22
(Vietnam) Phạm Văn Hải (Vietnam) Thân Vân Anh	14	20
(Philippines) Solomon Padiz Jr. (Philippines) Eleanor Inlayo	11	12
(Vietnam) Đỗ Tuấn Đức (Vietnam) Phạm Như Thảo	21	21
(Cambodia) Heng Mengleap (Cambodia) Phon Chenda	4	6
3	(Indonesia) Adnan Maulana (Indonesia) Mychelle Crhystine Bandaso	21	21
(Singapore) Andy Kwek (Singapore) Jin Yujia	20	15
(Thailand) Chaloempon Charoenkitamorn (Thailand) Laksika Kanlaha	22	21
(Laos) Daomixay Vorlasing (Laos) Vilakone Kommanivanh	7	7
2	(Malaysia) Hoo Pang Ron (Malaysia) Cheah Yee See	21	21

Quarter-final
1	(Indonesia) Rinov Rivaldy (Indonesia) Pitha Haningtyas Mentari	21	16	21
(Thailand) Panitchaphon Teeraratsakul (Thailand) Phataimas Muenwong	10	21	15
4	(Malaysia) Chen Tang Jie (Malaysia) Peck Yen Wei	21	21
(Singapore) Terry Hee (Singapore) Tan Wei Han	19	19
(Vietnam) Đỗ Tuấn Đức (Vietnam) Phạm Như Thảo	9	10
3	(Indonesia) Adnan Maulana (Indonesia) Mychelle Crhystine Bandaso	21	21
(Thailand) Chaloempon Charoenkitamorn (Thailand) Laksika Kanlaha	8	16
2	(Malaysia) Hoo Pang Ron (Malaysia) Cheah Yee See	21	21

Semi-final
1	(Indonesia) Rinov Rivaldy (Indonesia) Pitha Haningtyas Mentari	22	13	18
4	(Malaysia) Chen Tang Jie (Malaysia) Peck Yen Wei	20	21	21
3	(Indonesia) Adnan Maulana (Indonesia) Mychelle Crhystine Bandaso	21	16	17
2	(Malaysia) Hoo Pang Ron (Malaysia) Cheah Yee See	18	21	21

Final
4	(Malaysia) Chen Tang Jie (Malaysia) Peck Yen Wei	15	21	21
2	(Malaysia) Hoo Pang Ron (Malaysia) Cheah Yee See	21	19	13

== See also ==
- Men's team tournament
- Women's team tournament
