= 2023 Indonesia Masters =

Badminton tournament in Indonesia

Tournament details
- Dates: 24–29 January
- Level: Super 500
- Total prize money: US$420,000
- Venue: Istora Gelora Bung Karno
- Location: Jakarta, Indonesia

Champions
- Men's singles: (Indonesia) Jonatan Christie
- Women's singles: (South Korea) An Se-young
- Men's doubles: (Indonesia) Leo Rolly Carnando (Indonesia) Daniel Marthin
- Women's doubles: (China) Liu Shengshu (China) Zhang Shuxian
- Mixed doubles: (China) Feng Yanzhe (China) Huang Dongping

The 2023 Indonesia Masters (officially known as the Daihatsu Indonesia Masters 2023 for sponsorship reasons) was a badminton tournament that took place at the Istora Gelora Bung Karno, Jakarta, Indonesia, from 24 to 29 January 2023 and had a total prize of US$420,000.

== Tournament ==
The 2023 Indonesia Masters was the third tournament of the 2023 BWF World Tour and was part of the Indonesia Masters championships, which had been held since 2010. This tournament was organized by the Badminton Association of Indonesia with sanction from the BWF.

=== Venue ===
This international tournament was held at the Istora Gelora Bung Karno in Jakarta, Indonesia.

=== Point distribution ===
Below is the point distribution table for each phase of the tournament based on the BWF points system for the BWF World Tour Super 500 event.

Winner	Runner-up	3/4	5/8	9/16	17/32	33/64	65/128
9,200	7,800	6,420	5,040	3,600	2,220	880	430

=== Prize pool ===
The total prize money was US$420,000 with the distribution of the prize money in accordance with BWF regulations.

Event	Winner	Finalist	Semi-finals	Quarter-finals	Last 16
Singles	$31,500	$15,960	$6,090	$2,520	$1,470
Doubles	$33,180	$15,960	$5,880	$3,045	$1,575

== Men's singles ==
=== Seeds ===
1. (Denmark) Viktor Axelsen (withdrew)
2. (Malaysia) Lee Zii Jia (second round)
3. (Singapore) Loh Kean Yew (second round)
4. (Indonesia) Jonatan Christie (champion)
5. (Indonesia) Anthony Sinisuka Ginting (second round)
6. (Chinese Taipei) Chou Tien-chen (first round)
7. (India) Lakshya Sen (quarter-finals)
8. (India) Prannoy H. S. (first round)

=== Finals ===
Semi-finals
PFQ	(China) Shi Yuqi	13	21	19
4	(Indonesia) Jonatan Christie	21	15	21
(Indonesia) Chico Aura Dwi Wardoyo	17	27	22
(Hong Kong) Ng Ka Long	21	25	20

Final
4	(Indonesia) Jonatan Christie	21	21
(Indonesia) Chico Aura Dwi Wardoyo	15	13

=== Top half ===
==== Section 1 ====
First round
PFQ	(Thailand) S Thammasin	21	17	11
(China) Lu GZ	9	21	21
(France) T J Popov	11	21	21
(Chinese Taipei) Wang T-w	21	17	13
5	(Indonesia) A S Ginting	21	21
(Hong Kong) Lee C Y	10	12
PFQ	(China) Shi YQ	21	21
(Japan) K Momota	18	7

Second round
(China) Lu GZ	21	17	21
(France) T J Popov	17	21	12
5	(Indonesia) A S Ginting	19	16
PFQ	(China) Shi YQ	21	21

Quarter-finals
(China) Lu GZ	10	17
PFQ	(China) Shi YQ	21	21

==== Section 2 ====
First round
4	(Indonesia) J Christie	21	21	21
(Republic of Ireland) N Nguyen	23	11	6
(India) S Kidambi	10	22
(Indonesia) S H Rhustavito	21	24
7	(India) L Sen	21	21
(Japan) K Naraoka	12	11
(Denmark) H-K Vittinghus	7	14
(Malaysia) Ng T Y	21	21

Second round
4	(Indonesia) J Christie	21	21
(Indonesia) S H Rhustavito	16	15
7	(India) L Sen	19	21	21
(Malaysia) Ng T Y	21	8	17

Quarter-finals
4	(Indonesia) J Christie	15	21	21
7	(India) L Sen	21	10	13

=== Bottom half ===
==== Section 3 ====
First round
Q4	(Indonesia) C Adinata	21	10	18
(Japan) K Nishimoto	16	21	21
(Canada) B Yang	21	21
6	(Chinese Taipei) Chou T-c	9	14
(Indonesia) C A Dwi Wardoyo	18	21	21
Q2	(India) P Rajawat	21	18	18
(China) Li SF	14	16
3	(Singapore) Loh K Y	21	21

Second round
(Japan) K Nishimoto	13	21	18
(Canada) B Yang	21	10	21
(Indonesia) C A Dwi Wardoyo	21	21
3	(Singapore) Loh K Y	18	15

Quarter-finals
(Canada) B Yang	16	16
(Indonesia) C A Dwi Wardoyo	21	21

==== Section 4 ====
First round
(Denmark) A Antonsen	21	21
PFQ	(China) Weng HY	15	16
(Japan) K Tsuneyama	21	21
8	(India) Prannoy H. S.	19	10
Q3	(Malaysia) Cheam J W	6	15
(Hong Kong) Ng K L	21	21
Q1	(Chinese Taipei) Lin C-y	18	17
2	(Malaysia) Lee Z J	21	21

Second round
(Denmark) A Antonsen	16	10
(Japan) K Tsuneyama	21	21
(Hong Kong) Ng K L	16	22	21
2	(Malaysia) Lee Z J	21	20	13

Quarter-finals
(Japan) K Tsuneyama	19	19
(Hong Kong) Ng K L	21	21

== Women's singles ==
=== Seeds ===
1. (Japan) Akane Yamaguchi (withdrew)
2. (China) Chen Yufei (withdrew)
3. (South Korea) An Se-young (champion)
4. (China) He Bingjiao (second round)
5. (Thailand) Ratchanok Intanon (quarter-finals)
6. (China) Wang Zhiyi (semi-finals)
7. (Spain) Carolina Marín (final)
8. (China) Han Yue (semi-finals)

=== Finals ===
Semi-finals
6	(China) Wang Zhiyi	9	21	16
3	(South Korea) An Se-young	21	10	21
8	(China) Han Yue	15	14
7	(Spain) Carolina Marín	21	21

Final
3	(South Korea) An Se-young	18	21	21
7	(Spain) Carolina Marín	21	18	13

=== Top half ===
==== Section 1 ====
First round
1	(Japan) A Yamaguchi
(Thailand) P Chochuwong	w	/	o
(United States) BW Zhang	21	17	21
(South Korea) Kim G-e	13	21	19
6	(China) Wang ZY	21	21
Q2	(Estonia) K Kuuba	17	6
(Germany) Y Li	17	16
(Denmark) M Blichfeldt	21	21

Second round
(Thailand) P Chochuwong	13	21	21
(United States) BW Zhang	21	16	19
6	(China) Wang ZY	21	21
(Denmark) M Blichfeldt	12	16

Quarter-finals
(Thailand) P Chochuwong	12	6
6	(China) Wang ZY	21	21

==== Section 2 ====
First round
3	(South Korea) An S-y	20	18
(Canada) M Li	22	6^{r}
(Japan) A Ohori	17	25	21
Q3	(Indonesia) P K Wardani	21	23	23
5	(Thailand) R Intanon	21	21
(India) M Bansod	15	13
(Denmark) L Kjærsfeldt	21	21
(Thailand) S Katethong	18	18

Second round
3	(South Korea) An S-y	18	21	21
Q3	(Indonesia) P K Wardani	21	7	10
5	(Thailand) R Intanon	21	17	21
(Denmark) L Kjærsfeldt	12	21	11

Quarter-finals
3	(South Korea) An S-y	21	21
5	(Thailand) R Intanon	15	15

=== Bottom half ===
==== Section 3 ====
First round
(India) S Nehwal	21	17	21
(Chinese Taipei) Pai Y-p	15	21	15
(China) Zhang YM	14	17
8	(China) Han Y	21	21
(Indonesia) G M Tunjung	12	21	21
Q1	(Chinese Taipei) Sung S-y	21	18	11
(Japan) N Okuhara	21	12	7
4	(China) He BJ	15	21	21

Second round
(India) S Nehwal	15	7
8	(China) Han Y	21	21
(Indonesia) G M Tunjung	21	21
4	(China) He BJ	19	17

Quarter-finals
8	(China) Han Y	19	21	21
(Indonesia) G M Tunjung	21	8	16

==== Section 4 ====
First round
(Thailand) B Ongbamrungphan	21	21
Q4	(United States) L Lam	4	9
(Chinese Taipei) Hsu W-c	10	10
7	(Spain) C Marín	21	21
(Singapore) Yeo J M	20	21	20
(Denmark) L Christophersen	22	14	22
PFQ	(India) A Kashyap	17	15
PFQ	(Spain) C Azurmendi	21	21

Second round
(Thailand) B Ongbamrungphan	19	13
7	(Spain) C Marín	21	21
(Denmark) L Christophersen	21	21
PFQ	(Spain) C Azurmendi	14	5

Quarter-finals
7	(Spain) C Marín	22	21
(Denmark) L Christophersen	20	9

== Men's doubles ==
=== Seeds ===
1. (Indonesia) Fajar Alfian / Muhammad Rian Ardianto (quarter-finals)
2. (Japan) Takuro Hoki / Yugo Kobayashi (semi-finals)
3. (Indonesia) Mohammad Ahsan / Hendra Setiawan (second round)
4. (Malaysia) Aaron Chia / Soh Wooi Yik (quarter-finals)
5. (China) Liu Yuchen / Ou Xuanyi (semi-finals)
6. (Denmark) Kim Astrup / Anders Skaarup Rasmussen (first round)
7. (Malaysia) Goh Sze Fei / Nur Izzuddin (withdrew)
8. (South Korea) Choi Sol-gyu / Kim Won-ho (first round)

=== Finals ===
Semi-finals
5	(China) Liu Yuchen (China) Ou Xuanyi	14	16
(China) He Jiting (China) Zhou Haodong	21	21
(Indonesia) Leo Rolly Carnando (Indonesia) Daniel Marthin	18	21	21
2	(Japan) Takuro Hoki (Japan) Yugo Kobayashi	21	17	3

Final
(China) He Jiting (China) Zhou Haodong	17	16
(Indonesia) Leo Rolly Carnando (Indonesia) Daniel Marthin	21	21

=== Top half ===
==== Section 1 ====
First round
1	(Indonesia) F Alfian (Indonesia) M R Ardianto	18	21	21
(Indonesia) P Kusumawardana (Indonesia) Y Rambitan	21	14	10
(France) C Popov (France) T J Popov	16	21	15
Q1	(Chinese Taipei) Chang K-c (Chinese Taipei) Po L-w	21	17	21
5	(China) Liu YC (China) Ou XY	21	21
Q2	(Denmark) R Kjær (Denmark) F Søgaard	10	13
(Indonesia) M F Gideon (Indonesia) K S Sukamuljo	21	21
(South Korea) Kang M-h (South Korea) Seo S-j	17	12

Second round
1	(Indonesia) F Alfian (Indonesia) M R Ardianto	13	21	21
Q1	(Chinese Taipei) Chang K-c (Chinese Taipei) Po L-w	21	9	14
5	(China) Liu YC (China) Ou XY	19	21	11
(Indonesia) M F Gideon (Indonesia) K S Sukamuljo	21	8	6^{r}

Quarter-finals
1	(Indonesia) F Alfian (Indonesia) M R Ardianto	21	13	23
5	(China) Liu YC (China) Ou XY	11	21	25

==== Section 2 ====
First round
4	(Malaysia) A Chia (Malaysia) Soh W Y	21	21
Q4	(Malaysia) Boon X Y (Malaysia) Wong T C	14	9
(China) Liang WK (China) Wang C	21	22
(Germany) M Lamsfuß (Germany) M Seidel	18	20
PFQ	(India) I Bhatnagar (India) K. S Pratheek	11	12
(China) He JT (China) Zhou HD	21	21
PFQ	(Indonesia) S K Gutama (Indonesia) M R P Isfahani	21	19	21
(Netherlands) R Jille (Netherlands) T van der Lecq	18	21	19

Second round
4	(Malaysia) A Chia (Malaysia) Soh W Y	22	21
(China) Liang WK (China) Wang C	20	13
(China) He JT (China) Zhou HD	22	21
PFQ	(Indonesia) S K Gutama (Indonesia) M R P Isfahani	20	17

Quarter-finals
4	(Malaysia) A Chia (Malaysia) Soh W Y	17	10
(China) He JT (China) Zhou HD	21	21

=== Bottom half ===
==== Section 3 ====
First round
(Malaysia) Tan K M (Malaysia) Tan W K	21	21
(India) K P Garaga (India) V G Panjala	17	9
(Japan) K Matsui (Japan) Y Takeuchi	18	21	21
8	(South Korea) Choi S-g (South Korea) Kim W-h	21	16	18
(South Korea) Ko S-h (South Korea) Shin B-c	11	16
(Indonesia) L R Carnando (Indonesia) D Marthin	21	21
(Japan) A Koga (Japan) T Saito	21	19	10
3	(Indonesia) M Ahsan (Indonesia) H Setiawan	17	21	21

Second round
(Malaysia) Tan K M (Malaysia) Tan W K	17	17
(Japan) K Matsui (Japan) Y Takeuchi	21	21
(Indonesia) L R Carnando (Indonesia) D Marthin	21	21
3	(Indonesia) M Ahsan (Indonesia) H Setiawan	14	17

Quarter-finals
(Japan) K Matsui (Japan) Y Takeuchi	13	11
(Indonesia) L R Carnando (Indonesia) D Marthin	21	21

==== Section 4 ====
First round
PFQ	(South Korea) Jin Y (South Korea) Na S-s	10	21	19
(Indonesia) M S Fikri (Indonesia) B Maulana	21	14	21
(China) Ren XY (China) Tan Q	22	10	21
6	(Denmark) K Astrup (Denmark) A S Rasmussen	20	21	17
PFQ	(Thailand) C Charoenkitamorn (Thailand) N Yordphaisong	19	13
(France) L Corvée (France) R Labar	21	21
Q3	(Chinese Taipei) Su C-h (Chinese Taipei) Ye H-w	16	16
2	(Japan) T Hoki (Japan) Y Kobayashi	21	21

Second round
(Indonesia) M S Fikri (Indonesia) B Maulana	21	21
(China) Ren XY (China) Tan Q	14	14
(France) L Corvée (France) R Labar	10	9
2	(Japan) T Hoki (Japan) Y Kobayashi	21	21

Quarter-finals
(Indonesia) M S Fikri (Indonesia) B Maulana	11	13
2	(Japan) T Hoki (Japan) Y Kobayashi	21	21

== Women's doubles ==
=== Seeds ===
1. (Japan) Nami Matsuyama / Chiharu Shida (second round)
2. (South Korea) Jeong Na-eun / Kim Hye-jeong (withdrew)
3. (South Korea) Kim So-yeong / Kong Hee-yong (second round)
4. (Thailand) Jongkolphan Kititharakul / Rawinda Prajongjai (semi-finals)
5. (Japan) Mayu Matsumoto / Wakana Nagahara (withdrew)
6. (Malaysia) Pearly Tan / Thinaah Muralitharan (semi-finals)
7. (Indonesia) Apriyani Rahayu / Siti Fadia Silva Ramadhanti (quarter-finals)
8. (Bulgaria) Gabriela Stoeva / Stefani Stoeva (withdrew)

=== Finals ===
Semi-finals
(China) Liu Shengshu (China) Zhang Shuxian	21	21
4	(Thailand) Jongkolphan Kititharakul (Thailand) Rawinda Prajongjai	11	9
6	(Malaysia) Pearly Tan (Malaysia) Thinaah Muralitharan	14	19
(Japan) Yuki Fukushima (Japan) Sayaka Hirota	21	21

Final
(China) Liu Shengshu (China) Zhang Shuxian	22	21
(Japan) Yuki Fukushima (Japan) Sayaka Hirota	20	19

=== Top half ===
==== Section 1 ====
First round
1	(Japan) N Matsuyama (Japan) C Shida	19	21	21
(Germany) L Efler (Germany) I Lohau	21	18	16
(Canada) C Choi (Canada) J Wu	13	17
(China) Liu SS (China) Zhang SX	21	21
PFQ	(China) Tan N (China) Xia YT	21	21
(Japan) R Iwanaga (Japan) K Nakanishi	12	14
(Netherlands) D Jille (Netherlands) C Seinen	14	16
(Hong Kong) Yeung N T (Hong Kong) Yeung P L	21	21

Second round
1	(Japan) N Matsuyama (Japan) C Shida	11	12
(China) Liu SS (China) Zhang SX	21	21
PFQ	(China) Tan N (China) Xia YT	21	18	21
(Hong Kong) Yeung N T (Hong Kong) Yeung P L	11	21	17

Quarter-finals
(China) Liu SS (China) Zhang SX	21	14	21
PFQ	(China) Tan N (China) Xia YT	15	21	8

==== Section 2 ====
First round
4	(Thailand) J Kititharakul (Thailand) R Prajongjai	21	21
(India) A Bhat (India) S Gautam	12	14
Q1	(Indonesia) M T P Sari (Indonesia) R A Rose	21	19	18
PFQ	(United States) F Corbett (United States) A Lee	8	21	21
7	(Indonesia) A Rahayu (Indonesia) S F S Ramadhanti	21	21
Q2	(Chinese Taipei) Chang C-h (Chinese Taipei) Yang C-t	14	9
Q4	(Chinese Taipei) Hu L-f (Chinese Taipei) Lin X-m	21	21
(Spain) C Azurmendi (Spain) B Corrales	15	12

Second round
4	(Thailand) J Kititharakul (Thailand) R Prajongjai	21	21
PFQ	(United States) F Corbett (United States) A Lee	10	9
7	(Indonesia) A Rahayu (Indonesia) S F S Ramadhanti	22	21
Q4	(Chinese Taipei) Hu L-f (Chinese Taipei) Lin X-m	20	16

Quarter-finals
4	(Thailand) J Kititharakul (Thailand) R Prajongjai	16	21	21
7	(Indonesia) A Rahayu (Indonesia) S F S Ramadhanti	21	17	18

=== Bottom half ===
==== Section 3 ====
First round
(Malaysia) V Hoo (Malaysia) Lim C S	21	21
(Chinese Taipei) Lee C-h (Chinese Taipei) Teng C-h	18	17
(Singapore) Jin YJ (Singapore) C Wong	8	13
6	(Malaysia) P Tan (Malaysia) Thinaah M	21	21
(Indonesia) F D Kusuma (Indonesia) A C Pratiwi	17	21	20
(China) Li WM (China) Liu XX	21	13	22
PFQ	(Hong Kong) Ng T Y (Hong Kong) Tsang H Y	19	7
3	(South Korea) Kim S-y (South Korea) Kong H-y	21	21

Second round
(Malaysia) V Hoo (Malaysia) Lim C S	13	16
6	(Malaysia) P Tan (Malaysia) Thinaah M	21	21
(China) Li WM (China) Liu XX	22	22	21
3	(South Korea) Kim S-y (South Korea) Kong H-y	20	24	12

Quarter-finals
6	(Malaysia) P Tan (Malaysia) Thinaah M	21	21
(China) Li WM (China) Liu XX	10	12

==== Section 4 ====
First round
(Indonesia) L T Mayasari (Indonesia) R Sugiarto	21	21
Q3	(United States) A Xu (United States) K Xu	11	11
(India) H Manazhiyil (India) A Roy	10	7
PFQ	(India) T Crasto (India) A Ponnappa	21	21
(Japan) Y Fukushima (Japan) S Hirota	24	21
(France) M Lambert (France) A Tran	22	8
(South Korea) Baek H-n (South Korea) Lee S-h	w	/	o
2	(South Korea) Jeong N-e (South Korea) Kim H-j

Second round
(Indonesia) L T Mayasari (Indonesia) R Sugiarto	21	18	21
PFQ	(India) T Crasto (India) A Ponnappa	19	21	23
(Japan) Y Fukushima (Japan) S Hirota	21	21
(South Korea) Baek H-n (South Korea) Lee S-h	17	18

Quarter-finals
PFQ	(India) T Crasto (India) A Ponnappa	13	18
(Japan) Y Fukushima (Japan) S Hirota	21	21

== Mixed doubles ==
=== Seeds ===
1. (Japan) Yuta Watanabe / Arisa Higashino (withdrew)
2. (Malaysia) Tan Kian Meng / Lai Pei Jing (second round)
3. (France) Thom Gicquel / Delphine Delrue (semi-finals)
4. (Germany) Mark Lamsfuß / Isabel Lohau (first round)
5. (South Korea) Seo Seung-jae / Chae Yoo-jung (first round)
6. (Malaysia) Goh Soon Huat / Shevon Jemie Lai (quarter-finals)
7. (Indonesia) Rinov Rivaldy / Pitha Haningtyas Mentari (second round)
8. (Netherlands) Robin Tabeling / Selena Piek (first round)

=== Finals ===
Semi-finals
Q2	(China) Jiang Zhenbang (China) Wei Yaxin	21	21
(Japan) Yuki Kaneko (Japan) Misaki Matsutomo	16	16
3	(France) Thom Gicquel (France) Delphine Delrue	13	19
(China) Feng Yanzhe (China) Huang Dongping	21	21

Final
Q2	(China) Jiang Zhenbang (China) Wei Yaxin	15	21	19
(China) Feng Yanzhe (China) Huang Dongping	21	16	21

=== Top half ===
==== Section 1 ====
First round
PFQ	(United States) V Chiu (United States) J Gai	21	19	11
Q1	(Netherlands) T van der Lecq (Netherlands) D Jille	17	21	21
(China) Wang YL (China) Du Y	27	21
PFQ	(Canada) T A Lindeman (Canada) J Wu	25	18
5	(South Korea) Seo S-j (South Korea) Chae Y-j	13	21	17
Q2	(China) Jiang ZB (China) Wei YX	21	17	21
(Japan) K Yamashita (Japan) N Shinoya	21	21
(Indonesia) R N Kusharjanto (Indonesia) L A Kusumawati	16	18

Second round
Q1	(Netherlands) T van der Lecq (Netherlands) D Jille	18	20
(China) Wang YL (China) Du Y	21	22
Q2	(China) Jiang ZB (China) Wei YX	15	21	21
(Japan) K Yamashita (Japan) N Shinoya	21	9	18

Quarter-finals
(China) Wang YL (China) Du Y	11	15
Q2	(China) Jiang ZB (China) Wei YX	21	21

==== Section 2 ====
First round
4	(Germany) M Lamsfuß (Germany) I Lohau	12	21	19
(Hong Kong) Lee C H (Hong Kong) Ng T Y	21	11	21
(Hong Kong) Tang C M (Hong Kong) Tse Y S	17	16
(Indonesia) D Ferdinansyah (Indonesia) G E Widjaja	21	21
8	(Netherlands) R Tabeling (Netherlands) S Piek	14	21	21
(Japan) Y Kaneko (Japan) M Matsutomo	21	19	23
(England) G Mairs (England) J Moore	21	21
(Indonesia) Z J Sumanti (Indonesia) H Julimarbela	15	16

Second round
(Hong Kong) Lee C H (Hong Kong) Ng T Y	19	21	12
(Indonesia) D Ferdinansyah (Indonesia) G E Widjaja	21	12	21
(Japan) Y Kaneko (Japan) M Matsutomo	21	21
(England) G Mairs (England) J Moore	15	19

Quarter-finals
(Indonesia) D Ferdinansyah (Indonesia) G E Widjaja	21	18	13
(Japan) Y Kaneko (Japan) M Matsutomo	15	21	21

=== Bottom half ===
==== Section 3 ====
First round
(Chinese Taipei) Chang K-c (Chinese Taipei) Lee C-c	15	20
PFQ	(Denmark) M Thyrri (Denmark) A Magelund	21	22
(Denmark) M Christiansen (Denmark) A Bøje	6	21
6	(Malaysia) Goh S H (Malaysia) S J Lai	21	23
(Chinese Taipei) Ye H-w (Chinese Taipei) Lee C-h	w	/	o
(South Korea) Kim W-h (South Korea) Jeong N-e
(India) I Bhatnagar (India) T Crasto	16	15
3	(France) T Gicquel (France) D Delrue	21	21

Second round
PFQ	(Denmark) M Thyrri (Denmark) A Magelund	19	16
6	(Malaysia) Goh S H (Malaysia) S J Lai	21	21
(Chinese Taipei) Ye H-w (Chinese Taipei) Lee C-h	21	13	18
3	(France) T Gicquel (France) D Delrue	12	21	21

Quarter-finals
6	(Malaysia) Goh S H (Malaysia) S J Lai	16	19
3	(France) T Gicquel (France) D Delrue	21	21

==== Section 4 ====
First round
(Indonesia) P Jordan (Indonesia) M D Oktavianti	17	13
(China) Feng YZ (China) Huang DP	21	21
(Japan) H Midorikawa (Japan) N Saito	19	14
7	(Indonesia) R Rivaldy (Indonesia) P H Mentari	21	21
Q3	(Indonesia) J Hidayatullah (Indonesia) A S P Pranata	12	23	21
Q4	(India) R Kapoor (India) N S Reddy	21	21	16
(Germany) J R Jansen (Germany) L Efler	10	10
2	(Malaysia) Tan K M (Malaysia) Lai P J	21	21

Second round
(China) Feng YZ (China) Huang DP	21	21
7	(Indonesia) R Rivaldy (Indonesia) P H Mentari	16	8
Q3	(Indonesia) J Hidayatullah (Indonesia) A S P Pranata	21	7	21
2	(Malaysia) Tan K M (Malaysia) Lai P J	15	21	14

Quarter-finals
(China) Feng YZ (China) Huang DP	21	21
Q3	(Indonesia) J Hidayatullah (Indonesia) A S P Pranata	13	13

Preceded by 2023 India Open	BWF World Tour; 2023 BWF season	Succeeded by 2023 Thailand Masters
