= 2023 Australian Open (badminton) =

2023 badminton tournament in Sydney

Tournament details
- Dates: 1–6 August
- Level: Super 500
- Total prize money: US$420,000
- Venue: State Sports Centre
- Location: Sydney, Australia

Champions
- Men's singles: (China) Weng Hongyang
- Women's singles: (United States) Beiwen Zhang
- Men's doubles: (South Korea) Kang Min-hyuk (South Korea) Seo Seung-jae
- Women's doubles: (South Korea) Kim So-yeong (South Korea) Kong Hee-yong
- Mixed doubles: (China) Feng Yanzhe (China) Huang Dongping

The 2023 Australian Open (officially known as the Sathio Group Australian Open 2023 for sponsorship reasons) was a badminton tournament which took place at the State Sports Centre in Sydney, Australia, from 1 to 6 August 2023 and had a total prize of US$420,000.

== Tournament ==
The 2023 Australian Open was the nineteenth tournament in the 2023 BWF World Tour. It was a part of the Australian Open, which had been held since 1975. This tournament was organized by Badminton Australia with sanction from the BWF. The tournament was upgraded to a BWF World Tour Super 500 event starting from this edition.

=== Venue ===
This international tournament was held at the State Sports Centre in Sydney, Australia.

=== Point distribution ===
Below is the point distribution table for each phase of the tournament based on the BWF points system for the BWF World Tour Super 500 event.

Winner	Runner-up	3/4	5/8	9/16	17/32	33/64	65/128
9,200	7,800	6,420	5,040	3,600	2,220	880	430

=== Prize money ===
The total prize money for this tournament was US$420,000. The distribution of the prize money will be in accordance with BWF regulations.

Event	Winner	Finalist	Semi-finals	Quarter-finals	Last 16
Singles	$31,500	$15,960	$6,090	$2,520	$1470
Doubles	$33,180	$15,960	$5,880	$3,045	$1575

== Men's singles ==
=== Seeds ===
1. (Indonesia) Anthony Sinisuka Ginting (Quarter-finals)
2. (Japan) Kodai Naraoka (First round)
3. (China) Shi Yuqi (Withdrew)
4. (Singapore) Loh Kean Yew (First round)
5. (Chinese Taipei) Chou Tien-chen (Quarter-finals)
6. (India) Prannoy H. S. (Final)
7. (Indonesia) Jonatan Christie (Second round)
8. (China) Li Shifeng (Withdrew)

=== Finals ===
Semi-finals
6	(India) Prannoy H. S.	21	21
(India) Priyanshu Rajawat	18	12
(Malaysia) Lee Zii Jia	19	21	13
(China) Weng Hongyang	21	13	21

Final
6	(India) Prannoy H. S.	9	23	20
(China) Weng Hongyang	21	21	22

=== Top half ===
==== Section 1 ====
First round
1	(Indonesia) A S Ginting	21	18	21
(Hong Kong) Ng K L	18	21	12
PFQ	(India) K George	5
(India) L Sen	0^{r}
6	(India) Prannoy H. S.	21	16	21
(Hong Kong) Lee C Y	18	21	15
(Canada) B Yang	11	5
PFQ	(Chinese Taipei) Chi Y-j	21	21

Second round
1	(Indonesia) A S Ginting	21	21
PFQ	(India) K George	15	18
6	(India) Prannoy H. S.	19	21	21
PFQ	(Chinese Taipei) Chi Y-j	21	19	13

Quarter-finals
1	(Indonesia) A S Ginting	21	17	14
6	(India) Prannoy H. S.	16	21	21

==== Section 2 ====
First round
PFQ	(South Korea) Jeon H-j	21	14	7
(Chinese Taipei) Wang T-w	15	21	21
(India) P Rajawat	21	21
WC	(Australia) N Tang	12	16
PFQ	(Chinese Taipei) Su L-y	21	21
Q4	(Germany) K Schäfer	12	12
(India) S Kidambi	21	21
(Japan) K Nishimoto	18	7

Second round
(Chinese Taipei) Wang T-w	8	21	19
(India) P Rajawat	21	13	21
PFQ	(Chinese Taipei) Su L-y	10	17
(India) S Kidambi	21	21

Quarter-finals
(India) P Rajawat	21	21
(India) S Kidambi	13	8

=== Bottom half ===
==== Section 3 ====
First round
(Malaysia) Ng T Y	21	21
(Japan) K Tsuneyama	18	8
(Japan) K Momota	23	14	12
7	(Indonesia) J Christie	21	21	21
(Malaysia) Lee Z J	12	21	21
Q2	(Malaysia) Leong J H	21	17	16
(India) M Manjunath	21	21
4	(Singapore) Loh K Y	19	19

Second round
(Malaysia) Ng T Y	22	21
7	(Indonesia) J Christie	20	15
(Malaysia) Lee Z J	21	12	21
(India) M Manjunath	13	21	19

Quarter-finals
(Malaysia) Ng T Y	21	24	19
(Malaysia) Lee Z J	17	26	21

==== Section 4 ====
First round
(China) Zhao JP	21	21
Q3	(Australia) R Tang	13	15
Q1	(Hong Kong) Chan Y C	21	7	10
5	(Chinese Taipei) Chou T-c	7	21	21
(Indonesia) S H Rhustavito	21	21
(Thailand) K Wangcharoen	12	19
(China) Weng HY	21	21
2	(Japan) K Naraoka	19	11

Second round
(China) Zhao JP	21	20	10
5	(Chinese Taipei) Chou T-c	16	22	21
(Indonesia) S H Rhustavito	21	10	9
(China) Weng HY	16	21	21

Quarter-finals
5	(Chinese Taipei) Chou T-c	10	16
(China) Weng HY	21	21

== Women's singles ==
=== Seeds ===
1. (South Korea) An Se-young (Withdrew)
2. (Thailand) Ratchanok Intanon (Semi-finals)
3. (Thailand) Pornpawee Chochuwong (First round)
4. (United States) Beiwen Zhang (Champion)
5. (India) P. V. Sindhu (Quarter-finals)
6. (Thailand) Supanida Katethong (Quarter-finals)
7. (South Korea) Kim Ga-eun (Final)
8. (Japan) Aya Ohori (Semi-finals)

=== Finals ===
Semi-finals
8	(Japan) Aya Ohori	10	11
7	(South Korea) Kim Ga-eun	21	21
4	(United States) Beiwen Zhang	21	8
2	(Thailand) Ratchanok Intanon	17	3^{r}

Final
7	(South Korea) Kim Ga-eun	22	16	8
4	(United States) Beiwen Zhang	20	21	21

=== Top half ===
==== Section 1 ====
First round
PFQ	(Chinese Taipei) Liang T-y	21	21
(Canada) WY Zhang	13	19
(India) M Bansod	20	11
(Chinese Taipei) Pai Y-p	22	21
8	(Japan) A Ohori	21	21
Q1	(Australia) Tse Y	2	4
(Indonesia) K A C Dewi	21	21
(India) T Mir	13	7

Second round
PFQ	(Chinese Taipei) Liang T-y	9	19
(Chinese Taipei) Pai Y-p	21	21
8	(Japan) A Ohori	21	21
(Indonesia) K A C Dewi	12	10

Quarter-finals
(Chinese Taipei) Pai Y-p	15	14
8	(Japan) A Ohori	21	21

==== Section 2 ====
First round
3	(Thailand) P Chochuwong	14	11
(Singapore) Yeo J M	21	21
Q2	(Australia) Teoh K Q	8	6
(Germany) Y Li	21	21
7	(South Korea) Kim G-e	21	21
Q4	(Ukraine) P Buhrova	10	19
(Indonesia) P K Wardani	21	13
(South Korea) Sim Y-j	23	21

Second round
(Singapore) Yeo J M	21	21
(Germany) Y Li	11	5
7	(South Korea) Kim G-e	21	21
(South Korea) Sim Y-j	18	17

Quarter-finals
(Singapore) Yeo J M	19	18
7	(South Korea) Kim G-e	21	21

=== Bottom half ===
==== Section 3 ====
First round
(India) A Kashyap	21	21
(Malaysia) Goh J W	15	17
(India) A Chaliha	18	13
5	(India) P. V. Sindhu	21	21
(United States) L Lam	4^{r}
(Chinese Taipei) Huang Y-h	12
WC	(Australia) T Ho	14	4
4	(United States) BW Zhang	21	21

Second round
(India) A Kashyap	14	10
5	(India) P. V. Sindhu	21	21
(Chinese Taipei) Huang Y-h	21	10	12
4	(United States) BW Zhang	19	21	21

Quarter-finals
5	(India) P. V. Sindhu	12	17
4	(United States) BW Zhang	21	21

==== Section 4 ====
First round
(Japan) S Kawakami	21	18	14
PFQ	(Chinese Taipei) Lin H-t	18	21	21
(Indonesia) E N T Wardoyo	7	11
6	(Thailand) S Katethong	21	21
(Belgium) L Tan	23	14
Q3	(Chinese Taipei) Huang C-p	25	21
(China) Gao FJ	10^{r}
2	(Thailand) R Intanon	12

Second round
PFQ	(Chinese Taipei) Lin H-t	15	17
6	(Thailand) S Katethong	21	21
Q3	(Chinese Taipei) Huang C-p	10	21	19
2	(Thailand) R Intanon	21	16	21

Quarter-finals
6	(Thailand) S Katethong	13	14
2	(Thailand) R Intanon	21	21

== Men's doubles ==
=== Seeds ===
1. (Indonesia) Fajar Alfian / Muhammad Rian Ardianto (Quarter-finals)
2. (Malaysia) Aaron Chia / Soh Wooi Yik (Quarter-finals)
3. (Japan) Takuro Hoki / Yugo Kobayashi (Final)
4. (Malaysia) Ong Yew Sin / Teo Ee Yi (Second round)
5. (Indonesia) Mohammad Ahsan / Hendra Setiawan (Second round)
6. (Indonesia) Leo Rolly Carnando / Daniel Marthin (Second round)
7. (South Korea) Choi Sol-gyu / Kim Won-ho (Withdrew)
8. (South Korea) Kang Min-hyuk / Seo Seung-jae (Champions)

=== Finals ===
Semi-finals
8	(South Korea) Kang Min-hyuk (South Korea) Seo Seung-jae	21	21
(Chinese Taipei) Lee Yang (Chinese Taipei) Wang Chi-lin	16	6
3	(Japan) Takuro Hoki (Japan) Yugo Kobayashi	21	21
(Chinese Taipei) Lu Ching-yao (Chinese Taipei) Yang Po-han	16	18

Final
8	(South Korea) Kang Min-hyuk (South Korea) Seo Seung-jae	21	21
3	(Japan) Takuro Hoki (Japan) Yugo Kobayashi	17	17

=== Top half ===
==== Section 1 ====
First round
1	(Indonesia) F Alfian (Indonesia) M R Ardianto	21	21
PFQ	(New Zealand) R Tong (New Zealand) J Wang	14	9
PFQ	(Chinese Taipei) Chiang C-w (Chinese Taipei) Wu H-y	21	21
(Malaysia) Man W C (Malaysia) Tee K W	18	17
8	(South Korea) Kang M-h (South Korea) Seo S-j	21	21
(China) Chen BY (China) Liu Y	14	16
PFQ	(Chinese Taipei) Lu M-c (Chinese Taipei) Tang K-w	15	14
(Malaysia) Goh S F (Malaysia) N Izzuddin	21	21

Second round
1	(Indonesia) F Alfian (Indonesia) M R Ardianto	21	21
PFQ	(Chinese Taipei) Chiang C-w (Chinese Taipei) Wu H-y	10	10
8	(South Korea) Kang M-h (South Korea) Seo S-j	21	23
(Malaysia) Goh S F (Malaysia) N Izzuddin	16	21

Quarter-finals
1	(Indonesia) F Alfian (Indonesia) M R Ardianto	16	21	14
8	(South Korea) Kang M-h (South Korea) Seo S-j	21	15	21

==== Section 2 ====
First round
4	(Malaysia) Ong Y S (Malaysia) Teo E Y	20	21	21
(Canada) A Dong (Canada) N Yakura	22	6	14
(Chinese Taipei) Lee Y (Chinese Taipei) Wang C-l	21	16	21
(Malaysia) N M Azriyn A (Malaysia) Tan W K	16	21	17
PFQ	(Australia) S Madaan (Australia) Y Madaan	w	/	o
Q4
(Indonesia) S K Gutama (Indonesia) M R P Isfahani	19	16
(Japan) A Koga (Japan) T Saito	21	21

Second round
4	(Malaysia) Ong Y S (Malaysia) Teo E Y	21	17	19
(Chinese Taipei) Lee Y (Chinese Taipei) Wang C-l	18	21	21
PFQ	(Australia) S Madaan (Australia) Y Madaan	4	5
(Japan) A Koga (Japan) T Saito	21	21

Quarter-finals
(Chinese Taipei) Lee Y (Chinese Taipei) Wang C-l	24	21
(Japan) A Koga (Japan) T Saito	22	14

=== Bottom half ===
==== Section 3 ====
First round
(Indonesia) P Kusumawardana (Indonesia) Y Rambitan	w	/	o
Q1
PFQ	(Australia) R Hidayat (Australia) F W Putra	8	21	12
6	(Indonesia) L R Carnando (Indonesia) D Marthin	21	19	21
PFQ	(Australia) K Igawa (Australia) R Tam	6	10
(South Korea) Kim G-j (South Korea) Kim S-r	21	21
Q2
3	(Japan) T Hoki (Japan) Y Kobayashi	w	/	o

Second round
(Indonesia) P Kusumawardana (Indonesia) Y Rambitan	21	21
6	(Indonesia) L R Carnando (Indonesia) D Marthin	18	17
(South Korea) Kim G-j (South Korea) Kim S-r	13	13
3	(Japan) T Hoki (Japan) Y Kobayashi	21	21

Quarter-finals
(Indonesia) P Kusumawardana (Indonesia) Y Rambitan	6	16
3	(Japan) T Hoki (Japan) Y Kobayashi	21	21

==== Section 4 ====
First round
(Japan) K Matsui (Japan) Y Takeuchi	17	18
(Chinese Taipei) Lu C-y (Chinese Taipei) Yang P-h	21	21
(Canada) K Lee (Canada) T A Lindeman
5	(Indonesia) M Ahsan (Indonesia) H Setiawan	w	/	o
(Chinese Taipei) Chiu H-c (Chinese Taipei) Yang M-t	21	21
(Japan) A Endo (Japan) Y Takei	18	19
PFR	(Australia) A Fang (Australia) M Su	5	6
2	(Malaysia) A Chia (Malaysia) Soh W Y	21	21

Second round
(Chinese Taipei) Lu C-y (Chinese Taipei) Yang P-h	21	21
5	(Indonesia) M Ahsan (Indonesia) H Setiawan	10	13
(Chinese Taipei) Chiu H-c (Chinese Taipei) Yang M-t	19	14
2	(Malaysia) A Chia (Malaysia) Soh W Y	21	21

Quarter-finals
(Chinese Taipei) Lu C-y (Chinese Taipei) Yang P-h	21	21
2	(Malaysia) A Chia (Malaysia) Soh W Y	15	17

== Women's doubles ==
=== Seeds ===
1. (South Korea) Baek Ha-na / Lee So-hee (Withdrew)
2. (South Korea) Kim So-yeong / Kong Hee-yong (Champions)
3. (China) Zhang Shuxian / Zheng Yu (Quarter-finals)
4. (Japan) Mayu Matsumoto / Wakana Nagahara (Quarter-finals)
5. (South Korea) Jeong Na-eun / Kim Hye-jeong (Withdrew)
6. (Japan) Yuki Fukushima / Sayaka Hirota (Semi-finals)
7. (Indonesia) Apriyani Rahayu / Siti Fadia Silva Ramadhanti (Second round)
8. (Thailand) Jongkolphan Kititharakul / Rawinda Prajongjai (First round)

=== Finals ===
Semi-finals
(Japan) Rena Miyaura (Japan) Ayako Sakuramoto	17	21	14
(China) Liu Shengshu (China) Tan Ning	21	17	21
6	(Japan) Yuki Fukushima (Japan) Sayaka Hirota	11	13
2	(South Korea) Kim So-yeong (South Korea) Kong Hee-yong	21	21

Final
(China) Liu Shengshu (China) Tan Ning	18	16
2	(South Korea) Kim So-yeong (South Korea) Kong Hee-yong	21	21

=== Top half ===
==== Section 1 ====
First round
PFQ	(United States) P L Cao Hok (United States) L Lam	7	7
(Japan) R Miyaura (Japan) A Sakuramoto	21	21
(Indonesia) F D Kusuma (Indonesia) A C Pratiwi	21	14	21
PFQ	(India) T Crasto (India) A Ponnappa	11	21	17
PFQ	(Chinese Taipei) Liu C-y (Chinese Taipei) Wang Y-q	15	19
(Japan) R Iwanaga (Japan) K Nakanishi	21	21
(Japan) N Matsuyama (Japan) C Shida	22	21
Q3	(Chinese Taipei) Hsu Y-h (Chinese Taipei) Lee C-c	20	8

Second round
(Japan) R Miyaura (Japan) A Sakuramoto	21	21
(Indonesia) F D Kusuma (Indonesia) A C Pratiwi	17	11
(Japan) R Iwanaga (Japan) K Nakanishi	21	21
(Japan) N Matsuyama (Japan) C Shida	17	16

Quarter-finals
(Japan) R Miyaura (Japan) A Sakuramoto	21	21
(Japan) R Iwanaga (Japan) K Nakanishi	13	19

==== Section 2 ====
First round
3	(China) Zhang SX (China) Zheng Y	22	17	21
(Malaysia) P Tan (Malaysia) Thinaah M	20	21	17
(Singapore) Jin YJ (Singapore) C Wong	11	21	21
(Malaysia) V Hoo (Malaysia) Lim C S	21	18	19
8	(Thailand) J Kititharakul (Thailand) R Prajongjai	12	17
(China) Liu SS (China) Tan N	21	21
(China) Li YJ (China) Luo XM	16	21	21
(Chinese Taipei) Hsu Y-c (Chinese Taipei) Lin W-c	21	19	12

Second round
3	(China) Zhang SX (China) Zheng Y	18	21	21
(Singapore) Jin YJ (Singapore) C Wong	21	15	9
(China) Liu SS (China) Tan N	21	21
(China) Li YJ (China) Luo XM	14	15

Quarter-finals
3	(China) Zhang SX (China) Zheng Y	17	14
(China) Liu SS (China) Tan N	21	21

=== Bottom half ===
==== Section 3 ====
First round
Q2	(Australia) K Ea (Australia) G Somerville	16	14
(Germany) L Efler (Germany) I Lohau	21	21
(Hong Kong) Yeung N T (Hong Kong) Yeung P L	7	4
6	(Japan) Y Fukushima (Japan) S Hirota	21	21
(India) G Gopichand (India) T Jolly	21	21
(Canada) C Choi (Canada) J Wu	16	17
(Chinese Taipei) Hsieh P-s (Chinese Taipei) Tseng Y-c	8	14
4	(Japan) M Matsumoto (Japan) W Nagahara	21	21

Second round
(Germany) L Efler (Germany) I Lohau	16	9
6	(Japan) Y Fukushima (Japan) S Hirota	21	21
(India) G Gopichand (India) T Jolly	10	20
4	(Japan) M Matsumoto (Japan) W Nagahara	21	22

Quarter-finals
6	(Japan) Y Fukushima (Japan) S Hirota	15	21	21
4	(Japan) M Matsumoto (Japan) W Nagahara	21	14	15

==== Section 4 ====
First round
(Thailand) B Aimsaard (Thailand) N Aimsaard	21	21
Q1	(Australia) S Tjonadi (Australia) V Tjonadi	4	9
(South Korea) Lee Y-l (South Korea) Shin S-c	22	15
7	(Indonesia) A Rahayu (Indonesia) S F S Ramadhanti	24	21
Q4	(Australia) S Mapasa (Australia) A Yu	21	18	22
(Japan) R Hirokami (Japan) Y Kato	14	21	24
(United States) A Xu (United States) K Xu	11	14
2	(South Korea) Kim S-y (South Korea) Kong H-y	21	21

Second round
(Thailand) B Aimsaard (Thailand) N Aimsaard	21	23
7	(Indonesia) A Rahayu (Indonesia) S F S Ramadhanti	19	21
(Japan) R Hirokami (Japan) Y Kato	15	15
2	(South Korea) Kim S-y (South Korea) Kong H-y	21	21

Quarter-finals
(Thailand) B Aimsaard (Thailand) N Aimsaard	9	10
2	(South Korea) Kim S-y (South Korea) Kong H-y	21	21

== Mixed doubles ==
=== Seeds ===
1. (Japan) Yuta Watanabe / Arisa Higashino (Withdrew)
2. (China) Feng Yanzhe / Huang Dongping (Champions)
3. (South Korea) Seo Seung-jae / Chae Yoo-jung (Semi-finals)
4. (South Korea) Kim Won-ho / Jeong Na-eun (Withdrew)
5. (Malaysia) Goh Soon Huat / Shevon Jemie Lai (Second round)
6. (China) Jiang Zhenbang / Wei Yaxin (Quarter-finals)
7. (Indonesia) Rehan Naufal Kusharjanto / Lisa Ayu Kusumawati (First round)
8. (Malaysia) Chen Tang Jie / Toh Ee Wei (Second round)

=== Finals ===
Semi-finals
PFQ	(China) Cheng Xing (China) Chen Fanghui	19	19
(Japan) Hiroki Midorikawa (Japan) Natsu Saito	21	21
3	(South Korea) Seo Seung-jae (South Korea) Chae Yoo-jung	14	28	14
2	(China) Feng Yanzhe (China) Huang Dongping	21	26	21

Final
(Japan) Hiroki Midorikawa (Japan) Natsu Saito	14	21	15
2	(China) Feng Yanzhe (China) Huang Dongping	21	16	21

=== Top half ===
==== Section 1 ====
First round
PFQ	(Australia) R Wang (Australia) A Yu	23	21
Q1	(Australia) A Reynardi (Australia) V Tjonadi	21	17
PFQ	(China) Cheng X (China) Chen FH	21	21
(Japan) Y Kaneko (Japan) M Matsutomo	19	18
8	(Malaysia) Chen T J (Malaysia) Toh E W	21	21
Q2	(South Korea) Lee J-s (Australia) C Ho	10	4
(Indonesia) R Rivaldy (Indonesia) P H Mentari	14	21	21
(Indonesia) D Ferdinansyah (Indonesia) G E Widjaja	21	15	15

Second round
PFQ	(Australia) R Wang (Australia) A Yu	16	10
PFQ	(China) Cheng X (China) Chen FH	21	21
8	(Malaysia) Chen T J (Malaysia) Toh E W	16	21	19
(Indonesia) R Rivaldy (Indonesia) P H Mentari	21	17	21

Quarter-finals
PFQ	(China) Cheng X (China) Chen FH	21	21
(Indonesia) R Rivaldy (Indonesia) P H Mentari	16	16

==== Section 2 ====
First round
PFQ	(Chinese Taipei) Lee J-h (Chinese Taipei) Hsu Y-c	21	21
(United States) V Chiu (United States) J Gai	12	13
(Japan) K Yamashita (Japan) N Shinoya	21	21
Q3	(Australia) R Hidayat (Australia) J Choong	11	14
5	(Malaysia) Goh S H (Malaysia) S J Lai	21	11	21
Q4	(Chinese Taipei) Lu M-c (Chinese Taipei) Hu E-t	12	21	13
PFQ	(India) B S Reddy (India) A Ponnappa	13	12
(Japan) H Midorikawa (Japan) N Saito	21	21

Second round
PFQ	(Chinese Taipei) Lee J-h (Chinese Taipei) Hsu Y-c	21	21	12
(Japan) K Yamashita (Japan) N Shinoya	19	23	21
5	(Malaysia) Goh S H (Malaysia) S J Lai	17	21	17
(Japan) H Midorikawa (Japan) N Saito	21	18	21

Quarter-finals
(Japan) K Yamashita (Japan) N Shinoya	21	14	11
(Japan) H Midorikawa (Japan) N Saito	18	21	21

=== Bottom half ===
==== Section 3 ====
First round
(Chinese Taipei) Chang K-c (Chinese Taipei) Lee C-c	19	19
(Indonesia) P Jordan (Indonesia) M D Oktavianti	21	21
(Hong Kong) Tang C M (Hong Kong) Tse Y S	20	21	21
7	(Indonesia) R N Kusharjanto (Indonesia) L A Kusumawati	22	11	10
(Malaysia) Hoo P R (Malaysia) Teoh M X	21	21
(Singapore) T Hee (Singapore) J Tan	15	17
(India) R Kapoor (India) S Reddy	14	18
3	(South Korea) Seo S-j (South Korea) Chae Y-j	21	21

Second round
(Indonesia) P Jordan (Indonesia) M D Oktavianti	13	10
(Hong Kong) Tang C M (Hong Kong) Tse Y S	21	21
(Malaysia) Hoo P R (Malaysia) Teoh M X	20	21	12
3	(South Korea) Seo S-j (South Korea) Chae Y-j	22	11	21

Quarter-finals
(Hong Kong) Tang C M (Hong Kong) Tse Y S	18	9
3	(South Korea) Seo S-j (South Korea) Chae Y-j	21	21

==== Section 4 ====
First round
PFQ	(Australia) K Choo (Australia) G Somerville	18	14
(Hong Kong) Lee C H (Hong Kong) Ng T Y	21	21
(Canada) T A Lindeman (Canada) J Wu
6	(China) Jiang ZB (China) Wei YX	w	/	o
(Indonesia) A Maulana (Indonesia) N V Marwah	21	21
(Malaysia) Chan P S (Malaysia) Cheah Y S	16	10
(Malaysia) Tan K M (Malaysia) Lai P J	10	21	16
2	(China) Feng YZ (China) Huang DP	21	14	21

Second round
(Hong Kong) Lee C H (Hong Kong) Ng T Y	17	14
6	(China) Jiang ZB (China) Wei YX	21	21
(Indonesia) A Maulana (Indonesia) N V Marwah	9	13
2	(China) Feng YZ (China) Huang DP	21	21

Quarter-finals
6	(China) Jiang ZB (China) Wei YX	17	19
2	(China) Feng YZ (China) Huang DP	21	21

Preceded by 2022 Australian Open	Australian Open	Succeeded by 2024 Australian Open
Preceded by 2023 Japan Open	BWF World Tour; 2023 BWF season	Succeeded by 2023 China Open; 2023 Indonesia Masters Super 100 I
