= Yeremia Rambitan =

Indonesian badminton player (born 1999)

Personal information
- Born: Yeremia Erich Yoche Yacob Rambitan; 15 October 1999 (age 27) Jakarta, Indonesia
- Height: 1.75 m (5 ft 9 in)

Sport
- Country: Indonesia
- Sport: Badminton
- Handedness: Right
- Coached by: Herry Iman Pierngadi; Aryono Miranat

Men's doubles
- Highest ranking: 11 (with Pramudya Kusumawardana, 8 November 2022)
- BWF profile
Medal record
Men's badminton
Representing Indonesia
Asian Championships
Gold medal – first place	2022 Manila	Men's doubles
Asia Mixed Team Championships
Gold medal – first place	2025 Qingdao	Mixed team
Asia Team Championships
Silver medal – second place	2022 Selangor	Men's team
SEA Games
Gold medal – first place	2023 Cambodia	Men's doubles
Gold medal – first place	2023 Cambodia	Men's team
Silver medal – second place	2021 Vietnam	Men's doubles
Bronze medal – third place	2021 Vietnam	Men's team
World Junior Championships
Bronze medal – third place	2017 Yogyakarta	Boys' doubles
Asian Junior Championships
Silver medal – second place	2017 Jakarta	Mixed team

Yeremia Erich Yotje Yacob Rambitan (born 15 October 1999) is an Indonesian badminton player, who also plays for Exist Jakarta in the national event. He won the gold medals at the 2022 Asian Championships and 2023 SEA Games. In his young age, Rambitan won the mixed doubles Junior National Championships title in 2016, and the boys' doubles bronze medal at the World Junior Championships in 2017.

== Early and personal life ==
Yeremia Erich Yotje Yacob Rambitan, sometimes spelled as Yeremia Erich Yoche Yacob Rambitan, was born on 15 October 1999. He started to playing badminton at the PB Kasih, trained by his father, Timothy Rambitan. In 2015, he entered the Ragunan Sports School under Luluk Hadiyanto, and then was recruited to join the Exist Jakarta team.

== Career ==
In the junior event, Rambitan managed to claim the 2016 Junior National Championships mixed doubles title partnered with Winny Oktavina Kandow, and led him to join national team in 2017. In September 2017, he won the U-19 mixed doubles title at the Malaysia International Junior Open with Angelica Wiratama. He later took part at the 2017 World Junior Championships, and won the bronze medal in the boys' doubles event with Rinov Rivaldy.

In 2019, Rambitan reached the final of the International Challenge tournament in Iran with Pramudya Kusumawardana, but was defeated to their compatriots Adnan Maulana and Ghifari Anandaffa Prihardika in straight game. In March, they lost in the second round of 2019 Orléans Masters from Chinese Taipei pair. In July, they lost in the second round of Russian Open from Russian pair Vladimir Ivanov and Ivan Sozonov. In August, they participated in Hyderabad Open in India but lost in the first round. In September, they lost in the second round of Vietnam Open.

In 2020, Rambitan who competed with Kusumawardana lost in the first round of 2020 Spain Masters. Due to the COVID-19 pandemic, numerous tournaments on the 2020 BWF World Tour were either cancelled or rescheduled for later in the year. In June, he participated at the PBSI home tournament and emerged as the men's doubles champions partnered with Fajar Alfian. The duo were unbeaten throughout the competition and out of five matches, they have only lost one game. He also part of Rajawali winning team at the PBSI Thomas Cup simulation.

=== 2021 ===
In January, Rambitan and Kusumawardana participated in Thailand tour and lost in the first round of 2020 Yonex Thailand Open, and in the second round of 2020 Toyota Thailand Open from the same pair of Mohammad Ahsan and Hendra Setiawan. In March European tour, they lost in the second round of Swiss Open, but took their first tournament victory as a combination in the 2021 Spain Masters, beating fellow Indonesian pair Sabar Karyaman Gutama and Muhammad Reza Pahlevi Isfahani. In October, they reached the second round of 2021 Denmark Open and won the Belgian International beating Muhammad Shohibul Fikri and Bagas Maulana in the final. In November, they lost in the semi-finals of 2021 Hylo Open from fellow Indonesian Leo Rolly Carnando and Daniel Marthin. They participated in the Indonesia Badminton Festival in Bali and reach the quarter-finals of 2021 Indonesia Masters from fellow Indonesian Marcus Fernaldi Gideon and Kevin Sanjaya Sukamuljo. In the next tour, they lost in the second round of 2021 Indonesia Open. They qualified for 2021 BWF World Tour Finals but only managed to book one win and eliminated in group stage.

=== 2022 ===
In February, Rambitan and Kusumawardana participated in 2022 Badminton Asia Team Championships with Indonesia and lost the title to Malaysia. In March, they participated in European tour and lost in the first round of 2022 All England Open, and reach the semi-finals of Swiss Open. In April, they lost in second round of Korea Open from teammate Muhammad Shohibul Fikri and Bagas Maulana, and the first round of Korea Masters.

In May, Rambitan and Kusumawardana won the 2022 Badminton Asia Championships gold medal in the men's doubles discipline after defeating Malaysian pair Aaron Chia and Soh Wooi Yik, ending Indonesia's 13-year wait for a men's doubles gold medal at the championships, which was won by Hendra Setiawan and Markis Kido. In latter May, he won a silver medal in the men's doubles with Kusumawardana and a bronze medal in the men's team at the SEA Games. In June, they lost in second round of 2022 Indonesia Masters from teammate Fajar Alfian and Muhammad Rian Ardianto. In the next tour, they lost in the quarter-final of 2022 Indonesia Open in which Rambitan get injured when they just needed one point.

=== 2023–2024 ===
Rambitan and Kusumawardana back as pair after 6 months recovery and opened the 2023 season at the Malaysia Open, but defeated in the second round to fellow Indonesian pair Mohammad Ahsan and Hendra Setiawan. They competed at the home tournament, Indonesia Masters, but had to lose in the first round from fellow Indonesian pair 1st seeds Fajar Alfian and Muhammad Rian Ardianto. In the next tournament, they lost in the quarter-finals of the Thailand Masters from Chinese Taipei pair Su Ching-heng and Ye Hong-wei.

In February, Rambitan join the Indonesia national badminton team to compete at the Badminton Asia Mixed Team Championships, but unfortunately the teams lost in the quarter-finals from team Korea.

In March, Rambitan and Kusumawardana competed in the All England Open but had to lose in the first round from 3rd seed fellow Indonesian pair Mohammad Ahsan and Hendra Setiawan. In the next tour, they lost again in the first round of Swiss Open from new combination Japanese pair Kenya Mitsuhashi and Hiroki Okamura who came from qualification. In the next tour, they competed in the Spain Masters, but had to lose in the quarter-finals from Chinese pair Ren Xiangyu and Tan Qiang.

In April, Rambitan and Kusumawardana competed at the Orléans Masters in France, but had to lose in the second round from French pair Julien Maio and William Villeger.

In May, Rambitan made his second appearance at the SEA Games, and won the gold medals in the men's team and doubles event. In late May, Rambitan and Kusumawardana competed in the second Asian tour at the Malaysia Masters, but had to lose in the first rounds from 2nd seed Malaysian pair Aaron Chia and Soh Wooi Yik. In the next tour, they competed in the Thailand Open, but lost in the second round from Chinese pair Ren Xiangyu and Tan Qiang in rubber games.

In June, Rambitan competed at the Singapore Open, but lost in the second round from 8th seed Malaysian pair Ong Yew Sin and Teo Ee Yi in straight games. In the next tour, he competed at the home tournament, Indonesia Open, but lost in the semi-finals from 2nd seed Malaysian pair Aaron Chia and Soh Wooi Yik in tight matches.

In July, Rambitan competed at the Korea Open, but had to lose in the second round from 5th seed Japanese pair Takuro Hoki and Yugo Kobayashi in straight games. In the next tour, they competed at the 2023 Japan Open, but lost in the first round against 2nd seed Chinese pair Liang Weikeng and Wang Chang.

In early August, Rambitan competed at the Australian Open, but had to lose in the quarter-finals from 3rd seed Japanese pair Takuro Hoki and Yugo Kobayashi in straight games.

In December, after his partner, Kusumawardana left the national team, the men's doubles head coach, Aryono Miranat, decided to pair him with Rahmat Hidayat. Starting from an unsatisfactory debut at the 2024 Thailand Masters, Rambitan and Hidayat then won their first title as a pair at the Sri Lanka International.

== Achievements ==
=== Asian Championships ===
Men's doubles
Year	Venue	Partner	Opponent	Score	Result	Ref.
2022	Muntinlupa Sports Complex; Metro Manila, Philippines	(Indonesia) Pramudya Kusumawardana	(Malaysia) Aaron Chia (Malaysia) Soh Wooi Yik	23–21, 21–10	Gold	

=== SEA Games ===
Men's doubles
Year	Venue	Partner	Opponent	Score	Result	Ref.
2021	Bac Giang Gymnasium; Bắc Giang, Vietnam	(Indonesia) Pramudya Kusumawardana	(Indonesia) Leo Rolly Carnando (Indonesia) Daniel Marthin	17–21, 19–21	Silver	
2023	Morodok Techo Badminton Hall; Phnom Penh, Cambodia	(Indonesia) Pramudya Kusumawardana	(Thailand) Peeratchai Sukphun (Thailand) Pakkapon Teeraratsakul	21–17, 21–19	Gold	

=== World Junior Championships ===
Boys' doubles
Year	Venue	Partner	Opponent	Score	Result	Ref.
2017	GOR Among Rogo; Yogyakarta, Indonesia	(Indonesia) Rinov Rivaldy	(China) Di Zijian (China) Wang Chang	15–21, 17–21	Bronze	

=== BWF World Tour (2 titles, 2 runners-up) ===
The BWF World Tour, which was announced on 19 March 2017 and implemented in 2018, is a series of elite badminton tournaments sanctioned by the Badminton World Federation (BWF). The BWF World Tours are divided into levels of World Tour Finals, Super 1000, Super 750, Super 500, Super 300 (part of the HSBC World Tour), and the BWF Tour Super 100.

Men's doubles
Year	Tournament	Level	Partner	Opponent	Score	Result	Ref.
2021	Spain Masters	Super 300	(Indonesia) Pramudya Kusumawardana	(Indonesia) Sabar Karyaman Gutama (Indonesia) Muhammad Reza Pahlevi Isfahani	21–15, 18–21, 21–14	(gold) Winner	
2024 (I)	Indonesia Masters	Super 100	(Indonesia) Rahmat Hidayat	(Thailand) Chaloempon Charoenkitamorn (Thailand) Worrapol Thongsa-nga	19–21, 15–21	(silver) Runner-up	
2024 (II)	Indonesia Masters	Super 100	(Indonesia) Rahmat Hidayat	(Indonesia) Raymond Indra (Indonesia) Patra Harapan Rindorindo	23–21, 21–18	(gold) Winner	
2026 (I)	Indonesia Masters	Super 100	(Indonesia) Patra Harapan Rindorindo	(Chinese Taipei) Lin Chia-yen (Chinese Taipei) Lin Yong-sheng	21–11, 19–21, 20–22	(silver) Runner-up	

=== BWF International Challenge/Series (3 titles, 5 runners-up) ===
Men's doubles
Year	Tournament	Partner	Opponent	Score	Result	Ref.
2019	Iran Fajr International	(Indonesia) Pramudya Kusumawardana	(Indonesia) Adnan Maulana (Indonesia) Ghifari Anandaffa Prihardika	18–21, 13–21	(silver) Runner-up	
2021	Belgian International	(Indonesia) Pramudya Kusumawardana	(Indonesia) Muhammad Shohibul Fikri (Indonesia) Bagas Maulana	21–18, 22–20	(gold) Winner	
2024	Sri Lanka International	(Indonesia) Rahmat Hidayat	(Malaysia) Bryan Goonting (Malaysia) Fazriq Razif	18–21, 21–15, 21–15	(gold) Winner	
2024	Slovenia Open	(Indonesia) Rahmat Hidayat	(Indonesia) Muhammad Al Farizi (Indonesia) Nikolaus Joaquin	15–21, 20–22	(silver) Runner-up	
2024 (II)	Indonesia International	(Indonesia) Rahmat Hidayat	(Chinese Taipei) Lu Ching-yao (Chinese Taipei) Wu Guan-xun	23–21, 23–21	(gold) Winner	
2026	Singapore International	(Indonesia) Patra Harapan Rindorindo	(Indonesia) Taufik Aderya (Indonesia) Daniel Edgar Marvino	19–21, 22–24	(silver) Runner-up	
2026 (I)	Indonesia International	(Indonesia) Patra Harapan Rindorindo	(Indonesia) Wahyu Agung Prasetyo (Indonesia) Pulung Ramadhan	20–22, 15–21	(silver) Runner-up	
2026 (II)	Indonesia International	(Indonesia) Patra Harapan Rindorindo	(Indonesia) Taufik Aderya (Indonesia) Alexius Ongkytama Subagio	9–21, 9–21	(silver) Runner-up	

BWF International Challenge tournament
BWF International Series tournament

=== BWF Junior International (1 title) ===
Mixed doubles
Year	Tournament	Partner	Opponent	Score	Result	Ref.
2017	Malaysia International Junior Open	(Indonesia) Angelica Wiratama	(Indonesia) Rehan Naufal Kusharjanto (Indonesia) Siti Fadia Silva Ramadhanti	21–11, 21–16	(gold) Winner	

BWF Junior International Grand Prix tournament
BWF Junior International Challenge tournament
BWF Junior International Series tournament
BWF Junior Future Series tournament

== Performance timeline ==
Key

W	Won	F	Finalist	SF	Semi-finalist
QF	Quarter-finalist	#R	Rounds 4, 3, 2, 1	RR	Round-robin stage
Q#	Qualification round	A	Absent	w/d	Withdrew
G	Gold	S	Silver	B	Bronze
NH	Not held	N/A	Not applicable	DNQ	Did not qualify

=== National team ===
- Junior level

Team events	2017
Asian Junior Championships	S
World Junior Championships	5th

- Senior level

Team events	2021	2022	2023	2024	2025	Ref
SEA Games	B	NH	G	NH		
Asia Team Championships	NH	S	NH	QF	NH	
Asia Mixed Team Championships	NH		QF	NH	G	

=== Individual competitions ===
==== Junior level ====
Boys' doubles

Events	2017	Ref
World Junior Championships	B	

Mixed doubles

Events	2017
World Junior Championships	QF

==== Senior level ====
===== Men's doubles =====
Events	2021	2022	2023	Ref
SEA Games	S	NH	G	
Asian Championships	NH	G	A	

Tournament	BWF World Tour									Best	Ref
Tournament	2018	2019	2020	2021	2022	2023	2024	2025	2026	Best	Ref
Malaysia Open	A		NH		A	2R	A			2R ('23)	
Indonesia Masters	A			QF	2R	1R	A	1R	A	QF ('21)	
Thailand Masters	A			NH		QF	2R	2R	A	QF ('23)	
All England Open	A				1R	1R	A			1R ('22, 23)	
Swiss Open	A		NH	2R	SF	1R	A			SF ('22)	
Ruichang China Masters	A		NH		NA	A		2R	A	2R ('25)	
Orléans Masters	A	2R	NH	A		2R	A			2R ('19, '23)	
Baoji China Masters	NA						A		Q1	Q1 ('26)	
Thailand Open	A		1R	NH	A	2R	A			2R ('20, '23)	
Thailand Open	A		2R	NH	A	2R	A			2R ('20, '23)	
Malaysia Masters	A			NH	A	1R	A			1R ('23)	
Singapore Open	A		NH		w/d	2R	A			2R ('23)	
Indonesia Open	A		NH	2R	QF	SF	1R	A		SF ('23)	
Australian Open	A		NH		A	QF	A			QF ('23)	
Macau Open	A		NH				1R	2R	A	2R ('25)	
Japan Open	A		NH		A	1R	A			1R ('23)	
China Open	A		NH			2R	A			2R ('23)	
Taipei Open	A		NH		A		2R	QF	A	QF ('25)	
Korea Masters	A		NH		1R	A				1R ('22)	
China Masters	A		NH			QF	A	1R	A	QF ('23)	
Indonesia Masters Super 100	1R	2R	NH		A	A	F	A	F	W ('24 II)	
Indonesia Masters Super 100	1R	2R	NH		A	A	W	A	QF	W ('24 II)	
Vietnam Open	A	2R	NH		A					2R ('19)	
Arctic Open	N/A		NH			QF	A			QF ('23)	
Denmark Open	A			2R	A	1R	A			2R ('21)	
French Open	A		NH	A		1R	A			1R ('23)	
Hylo Open	A			SF	A					SF ('21)	
Korea Open	A		NH		2R	2R	A	1R	A	2R ('22, '23)	
Japan Masters	NH					2R	A			2R ('23)	
Kaohsiung Masters	NH					A	2R	A		2R ('24)	
Hong Kong Open	A		NH			2R	A			2R ('23)	
Syed Modi International	A		NH		A				Q	('26)	
Guwahati Masters	NH					A			Q	('26)	
World Tour Finals	DNQ			RR	DNQ					RR ('21)	
Hyderabad Open	A	1R	NH							1R ('19)	
Russian Open	A	2R	NH							2R ('19)	
Spain Masters	A		1R	W	NH	QF	A	NH		W ('21)	
Year-end ranking	423	62	65	22	25	18	44	126		11	
Tournament	2018	2019	2020	2021	2022	2023	2024	2025	2026	Best	Ref

===== Mixed doubles =====
Tournament	BWF World Tour	Best
Tournament	2018	Best
Indonesia Masters Super 100	1R	1R ('18)
Year-end ranking	354	328
