= 2017 BWF World Junior Championships =

Tournament details
- Dates: 9–22 October
- Edition: 19th
- Level: International
- Venue: Among Rogo Sports Hall
- Location: Yogyakarta, Special Region of Yogyakarta, Indonesia

The 2017 BWF World Junior Championships (officially known as the Blibli.com Yonex-Sunrise BWF World Junior Championships 2017 for sponsorship reasons) was the nineteenth tournament of the BWF World Junior Championships. It was held in Yogyakarta, Indonesia at the Among Rogo Sports Hall between 9 and 22 October 2017.

== Host city selection ==
Bilbao (Spain) and Yogyakarta (Indonesia) originally submitted bids to host the 2016 competition. Badminton World Federation later awarded the event to Bilbao while Yogyakarta was appointed as host for the next edition. According to the Indonesian delegation, the Spanish bid for the 2016 edition was approved due to fears of political instability should Bilbao awarded the 2017 edition.

== Medalists ==
Event	Gold	Silver	Bronze
Teams	China; Bai Yupeng; Chen Sihang; Di Zijian; Fan Qiuyue; Gao Zhengze; Gu Junfeng; Guo Ruohan; Li Shifeng; Liu Shiwen; Shang Yichen; Wang Chang; Cai Yanyan; Han Yue; Li Wenmei; Liu Xuanxuan; Qiao Shijun; Wang Zhiyi; Xia Yuting; Zhang Shuxian; Zhou Meng	Malaysia; Aidil Sholeh; Chang Yee Jun; Chia Wei Jie; Kwek Yee Jian; Leong Jun Hao; Man Wei Chong; Ng Eng Cheong; Ng Tze Yong; Sim Fong Hau; Tee Kai Wun; Eng Sin Jou; Eoon Qi Xuan; Goh Jin Wei; Lim Mei Chen; Ng Wan Win; Pearly Tan Koong Le; Tan Sueh Jeou; Toh Ee Wei; Yap Ling	Japan; Keita Chikugo; Mahiro Kaneko; Yunosuke Kubota; Hiroki Midorikawa; Hiroki Nakayama; Kodai Naraoka; Takuma Obayashi; Naoki Yamada; Moto Hayashi; Rin Iwanaga; Hirari Mizui; Natsu Saito; Yui Suizu; Yuki Suzuki; Asuka Takahashi; Moe Yamaguchi
Teams	China; Bai Yupeng; Chen Sihang; Di Zijian; Fan Qiuyue; Gao Zhengze; Gu Junfeng; Guo Ruohan; Li Shifeng; Liu Shiwen; Shang Yichen; Wang Chang; Cai Yanyan; Han Yue; Li Wenmei; Liu Xuanxuan; Qiao Shijun; Wang Zhiyi; Xia Yuting; Zhang Shuxian; Zhou Meng	Malaysia; Aidil Sholeh; Chang Yee Jun; Chia Wei Jie; Kwek Yee Jian; Leong Jun Hao; Man Wei Chong; Ng Eng Cheong; Ng Tze Yong; Sim Fong Hau; Tee Kai Wun; Eng Sin Jou; Eoon Qi Xuan; Goh Jin Wei; Lim Mei Chen; Ng Wan Win; Pearly Tan Koong Le; Tan Sueh Jeou; Toh Ee Wei; Yap Ling	South Korea; Kang Min-hyuk; Ki Dong-ju; Kim Moon-jun; Kim Seong-jae; Kim Won-ho; Na Sung-seung; Shin Tae-yang; Wang Chan; An Se-young; Baek Ha-na; Jeong Min; Kim Min-ji; Lee Yu-rim; Park Ga-eun; Seong Ah-yeong
Boys' singles	(Thailand) Kunlavut Vitidsarn	(Malaysia) Leong Jun Hao	(China) Gao Zhengze
Boys' singles	(Thailand) Kunlavut Vitidsarn	(Malaysia) Leong Jun Hao	(Japan) Kodai Naraoka
Girls' singles	(Indonesia) Gregoria Mariska Tunjung	(China) Han Yue	(China) Cai Yanyan
Girls' singles	(Indonesia) Gregoria Mariska Tunjung	(China) Han Yue	(Malaysia) Goh Jin Wei
Boys' doubles	(Japan) Mahiro Kaneko (Japan) Yunosuke Kubota	(China) Di Zijian (China) Wang Chang	(South Korea) Kang Min-hyuk (South Korea) Kim Won-ho
Boys' doubles	(Japan) Mahiro Kaneko (Japan) Yunosuke Kubota	(China) Di Zijian (China) Wang Chang	(Indonesia) Rinov Rivaldy (Indonesia) Yeremia Rambitan
Girls' doubles	(South Korea) Baek Ha-na (South Korea) Lee Yu-rim	(Indonesia) Jauza Fadhila Sugiarto (Indonesia) Ribka Sugiarto	(China) Li Wenmei (China) Liu Xuanxuan
Girls' doubles	(South Korea) Baek Ha-na (South Korea) Lee Yu-rim	(Indonesia) Jauza Fadhila Sugiarto (Indonesia) Ribka Sugiarto	(China) Xia Yuting (China) Zhang Shuxian
Mixed doubles	(Indonesia) Rinov Rivaldy (Indonesia) Pitha Haningtyas Mentari	(Indonesia) Rehan Naufal Kusharjanto (Indonesia) Siti Fadia Silva Ramadhanti	(China) Fan Qiuyue (China) Liu Xuanxuan
Mixed doubles	(Indonesia) Rinov Rivaldy (Indonesia) Pitha Haningtyas Mentari	(Indonesia) Rehan Naufal Kusharjanto (Indonesia) Siti Fadia Silva Ramadhanti	(China) Liu Shiwen (China) Li Wenmei

== Medal table ==
Rank	Nation	Gold	Silver	Bronze	Total
1	Indonesia (INA)	2	2	1	5
2	China (CHN)	1	2	6	9
3	Japan (JPN)	1	0	2	3
3	South Korea (KOR)	1	0	2	3
5	Thailand (THA)	1	0	0	1
6	Malaysia (MAS)	0	2	1	3
Totals (6 entries)		6	6	12	24
