= Peck Yen Wei =

Malaysian badminton player

Peck Yen Wei 白燕微
Personal information
- Born: 10 February 1996 (age 30) Kuala Lumpur, Malaysia
- Height: 1.62 m (5 ft 4 in)

Sport
- Country: Malaysia
- Sport: Badminton
- Handedness: Right

Women's & mixed doubles
- Highest ranking: 65 (WD with Goh Yea Ching 17 November 2016); 21 (XD with Chen Tang Jie 8 November 2022)
- BWF profile
Medal record
Women's badminton
Representing Malaysia
Sudirman Cup
Bronze medal – third place	2021 Vantaa	Mixed team
SEA Games
Gold medal – first place	2021 Vietnam	Mixed doubles

Peck Yen Wei (Chinese: 白燕微; Pe̍h-ōe-jī: Pe̍k Iàn-bî, born 10 February 1996) is a Malaysian badminton player. She started playing badminton at aged ten in Sekolah Jenis Kebangsaan (C) Jinjang Utara. She made her debut in the international tournament in 2014, and at the same year she selected to join the national team.

== Career ==
In the junior event, she was the champion at the U-18 2013 Thailand Junior Championship in the girls' doubles event. Peck won her first senior international title at the 2016 Portugal International tournament in the women's doubles event partnered with Goh Yea Ching. Teamed-up with the Olympic silver medalist Chan Peng Soon in the mixed doubles event, they reached the semi-final round at the 2017 Indonesia Open, defeated by the 2016 Rio mixed doubles gold medalist from Indonesia Tontowi Ahmad and Liliyana Natsir in straight games. She won the mixed doubles title at the 2018 Malaysia International Challenge tournament partnered with Chen Tang Jie.

Peck resigned from Badminton Association of Malaysia (BAM) on 1 November 2022 due to splitting up with long-time partner Chen Tang Jie and an untimely ankle injury. She has joined CPS Badminton (founded by Chan Peng Soon) in Petaling Jaya as one of their coaches.

== Achievements ==
=== SEA Games ===
Mixed doubles
Year	Venue	Partner	Opponent	Score	Result
2021	Bac Giang Gymnasium; Bắc Giang, Vietnam	(Malaysia) Chen Tang Jie	(Malaysia) Hoo Pang Ron (Malaysia) Cheah Yee See	15–21, 21–19, 21–13	Gold

=== BWF World Tour (1 runner-up) ===
The BWF World Tour, which was announced on 19 March 2017 and implemented in 2018, is a series of elite badminton tournaments sanctioned by the Badminton World Federation (BWF). The BWF World Tours are divided into levels of World Tour Finals, Super 1000, Super 750, Super 500, Super 300, and the BWF Tour Super 100.

Mixed doubles
Year	Tournament	Level	Partner	Opponent	Score	Result
2022	India Open	Super 500	(Malaysia) Chen Tang Jie	(Singapore) Terry Hee (Singapore) Tan Wei Han	15–21, 18–21	(silver) Runner-up

=== BWF International Challenge/Series (2 titles, 4 runners-up) ===
Women's doubles
Year	Tournament	Partner	Opponent	Score	Result
2016	Portugal International	(Malaysia) Goh Yea Ching	(England) Chloe Birch (England) Sarah Walker	21–9, 21–15	(gold) Winner
2016	Romanian International	(Malaysia) Goh Yea Ching	(England) Jessica Pugh (Netherlands) Cheryl Seinen	19–21, 15–21	(silver) Runner-up

Mixed doubles
Year	Tournament	Partner	Opponent	Score	Result
2014	Bangladesh International	(Malaysia) Tan Wee Gieen	(Malaysia) Tan Chee Tean (Malaysia) Shevon Jemie Lai	17–21, 18–21	(silver) Runner-up
2015	Vietnam International Series	(Malaysia) Tan Kian Meng	(Indonesia) Rian Swastedian (Indonesia) Masita Mahmudin	13–21, 21–19, 17–21	(silver) Runner-up
2016	Romanian International	(Malaysia) Ong Yew Sin	(Malaysia) Wong Fai Yin (Malaysia) Shevon Jemie Lai	15–21, 17–21	(silver) Runner-up
2018	Malaysia International	(Malaysia) Chen Tang Jie	(Indonesia) Andika Ramadiansyah (Indonesia) Mychelle Crhystine Bandaso	12–21, 23–21, 21–13	(gold) Winner

BWF International Challenge tournament
BWF International Series tournament
BWF Future Series tournament
