= Pramudya Kusumawardana =

Indonesian-Australian badminton player (born 2000)

Personal information
- Born: Pramudya Kusumawardana Riyanto; 13 December 2000 (age 25) Sukabumi, West Java, Indonesia
- Height: 1.73 m (5 ft 8 in)
- Weight: 73 kg (161 lb)

Sport
- Country: Indonesia; Australia (since 2024)
- Sport: Badminton
- Handedness: Right
- Coached by: Herry Iman Pierngadi; Aryono Miranat

Men's & mixed doubles
- Highest ranking: 11 (MD with Yeremia Rambitan 8 November 2022); 229 (XD with Ribka Sugiarto 12 February 2019)
- Current ranking: 23 (MD with Yeremia Rambitan 30 April 2024)
- BWF profile
Medal record
Men's badminton
Representing Indonesia
Asian Championships
Gold medal – first place	2022 Manila	Men's doubles
Asia Team Championships
Silver medal – second place	2022 Selangor	Men's team
SEA Games
Gold medal – first place	2023 Cambodia	Men's doubles
Gold medal – first place	2023 Cambodia	Men's team
Silver medal – second place	2021 Vietnam	Men's doubles
Bronze medal – third place	2021 Vietnam	Men's team
World Junior Championships
Bronze medal – third place	2018 Markham	Mixed team
Asian Junior Championships
Bronze medal – third place	2018 Jakarta	Boys' doubles
Bronze medal – third place	2018 Jakarta	Mixed team

Pramudya Kusumawardana Riyanto (born 13 December 2000) is an Indonesian Australians badminton player. He was a men's doubles gold medalists at the 2022 Asian Championships and 2023 SEA Games. He was part of the Indonesian junior team that won the bronze medals at the 2018 Asian and World Junior Championships, and also the boys' doubles bronze in the 2018 Asian Junior Championships.

== Career ==
=== Early years ===
Kusumawardana is a member of Djarum badminton club. He won the boys' doubles junior title at the 2016 North Sumatera and Surabaya Opens and also the mixed doubles cadet title at the 2017 East Java Open. He then selected to join the Indonesia junior team competed at the 2018 Asian Junior Championships, and winning the bronze medals in the boys' doubles and mixed team events, later clinched the mixed team bronze at the 2018 World Junior Championships. Together with Ribka Sugiarto in the mixed doubles, he won a Junior Grand Prix title in the India Junior International tournament. He also became runner-up at the Finnish Open with Rehan Naufal Kusharjanto.

In 2019, Kusumawardana reached the final of the International Challenge tournament in Iran with Yeremia Rambitan, but was defeated by their compatriots Adnan Maulana and Ghifari Anandaffa Prihardika in straight games. In March, they lost in the second round of 2019 Orléans Masters to Chinese Taipei pair. In July, they lost in the second round of Russian Open to Russian pair Vladimir Ivanov and Ivan Sozonov. In August, they participated in Hyderabad Open in India but lost in the first round. In September, they lost in the second round of Vietnam Open.

In 2020, Kusumawardana competed with Yeremia Rambitan at the 2020 Spain Masters and lost in the first round.

=== 2021 ===
In January, Kusumawardana and Rambitan participated in Thailand tour and lost in the first round of 2020 Yonex Thailand Open, and in the second round of the next tour 2020 Toyota Thailand Open from the same pair of Mohammad Ahsan and Hendra Setiawan. In March European tour, they lost in the second round of Swiss Open, but took their first tournament victory as a pair in the 2021 Spain Masters, beating fellow Indonesian pair Sabar Karyaman Gutama and Muhammad Reza Pahlevi Isfahani.

In October, they reached the second round of 2021 Denmark Open and won the Belgian International beating Muhammad Shohibul Fikri and Bagas Maulana in the final. In November, they lost in the semi-finals of 2021 Hylo Open to fellow Indonesians Leo Rolly Carnando and Daniel Marthin. They reached the quarterfinals of 2021 Indonesia Masters to face fellow Indonesians Marcus Fernaldi Gideon and Kevin Sanjaya Sukamuljo. In the next tour, they lost in the second round of 2021 Indonesia Open. They qualified for 2021 BWF World Tour Finals but only managed one win and was eliminated in group stage.

=== 2022 ===
In February, Kusumawardana and Rambitan participated in Badminton Asia Team Championships with Indonesia and lost the title to Malaysia. In March, they participated in European tour and lost in the first round of All England Open, and reach the semi-finals of Swiss Open. In April, they lost in the second round of the Korea Open to teammates Muhammad Shohibul Fikri and Bagas Maulana, and the first round of the Korea Masters.

In May, they won the Badminton Asia Championships gold medal in men's doubles after defeating Malaysian pair Aaron Chia and Soh Wooi Yik, this ending Indonesia's 13-year wait for a men's doubles gold medal at the championships. In May, he won a silver medal in the men's doubles with Rambitan and a bronze medal in the men's team at the SEA Games. In June, they lost in the second round of the Indonesia Masters to teammates Fajar Alfian and Muhammad Rian Ardianto.

At the quarterfinals of the Indonesia Open, Kusumawardana's partner Rambitan injured his knee upon match point against Aaron Chia and Soh Wooi Yik, and the Indonesians end up losing the match. Upon Rambitan's diagnosis of anterior cruciate ligament injury, Kusumawardana opted to wait for his partner to recover. While waiting, Kusumawardana temporarily played with his junior Rahmat Hidayat in October. They managed to convert their only two appearances into titles: the Malang Indonesia International against Hiroki Okamura and Masayuki Onodera, and the Indonesia Masters Super 100 against first seeds He Jiting and Zhou Haodong.

=== 2023 ===
Kusumawardana and Rambitan opened the 2023 season at the Malaysia Open, where they lost in the second round by fellow Indonesian pair Mohammad Ahsan and Hendra Setiawan. They competed at the home tournament, Indonesia Masters, but lost to first seeds and seniors Fajar Alfian and Muhammad Rian Ardianto. Afterwards, they were stopped at the quarterfinals of Thailand Masters by Chinese Taipei pair Su Ching-heng and Ye Hong-wei.

In February, Kusumawardana was called up to the Indonesian team for Badminton Asia Mixed Team Championships, where he only played one match.

In March, Kusumawardana and Rambitan competed in the All England Open but lost to eventual runner-ups Mohammad Ahsan and Hendra Setiawan. They had another early exit at the Swiss Open to qualifiers Kenya Mitsuhashi and Hiroki Okamura. At the Spain Masters, they lost the quarter-finals to Chinese pair Ren Xiangyu and Tan Qiang.

In April, Kusumawardana and Rambitan competed at the Orléans Masters in France. They lost to home pair Julien Maio and William Villeger.

In May, Kusumawardana made his second appearance at the SEA Games and won the gold medals in the men's team and doubles event. In late May, Kusumawardana and Rambitan went to the Malaysia Masters, but lost at the first round to second seeds Aaron Chia and Soh Wooi Yik. Their next tournament, the Thailand Open, was yet another early exit, this time to Ren Xiangyu and Tan Qiang. He also lost at the second round of the Singapore Open to Ong Yew Sin and Teo Ee Yi. They later became semifinalists at home tournament Indonesia Open, losing to second seeds Aaron Chia and Soh Wooi Yik in three games.

Kusumawardana conceded defeat at the second round of Korea Open to Takuro Hoki and Yugo Kobayashi, and at the first round of the 2023 Japan Open against second seeds Liang Weikeng and Wang Chang. They reached the quarterfinals of the Australian Open before losing to Hoki and Kobayashi.

In December 2023, Kusumawardana officially announced his decision to depart from the national badminton team to pursue Sports Science & Sports Psychology in Sydney, Australia.

== Achievements ==
=== Asian Championships ===
Men's doubles
Year	Venue	Partner	Opponent	Score	Result	Ref.
2022	Muntinlupa Sports Complex; Metro Manila, Philippines	(Indonesia) Yeremia Rambitan	(Malaysia) Aaron Chia (Malaysia) Soh Wooi Yik	23–21, 21–10	Gold	

=== SEA Games ===
Men's doubles
Year	Venue	Partner	Opponent	Score	Result	Ref.
2021	Bac Giang Gymnasium; Bắc Giang, Vietnam	(Indonesia) Yeremia Rambitan	(Indonesia) Leo Rolly Carnando (Indonesia) Daniel Marthin	17–21, 19–21	Silver	
2023	Morodok Techo Badminton Hall; Phnom Penh, Cambodia	(Indonesia) Yeremia Rambitan	(Thailand) Peeratchai Sukphun (Thailand) Pakkapon Teeraratsakul	21–17, 21–19	Gold	

=== Asian Junior Championships ===
Boys' doubles
Year	Venue	Partner	Opponent	Score	Result	Ref.
2018	Jaya Raya Sports Hall Training Center; Jakarta, Indonesia	(Indonesia) Ghifari Anandaffa Prihardika	(China) Di Zijian (China) Wang Chang	15–21, 20–22	Bronze	

=== BWF World Tour (2 titles) ===
The BWF World Tour, which was announced on 19 March 2017 and implemented in 2018, is a series of elite badminton tournaments sanctioned by the Badminton World Federation (BWF). The BWF World Tours are divided into levels of World Tour Finals, Super 1000, Super 750, Super 500, Super 300 (part of the HSBC World Tour), and the BWF Tour Super 100.

Men's doubles
Year	Tournament	Level	Partner	Opponent	Score	Result	Ref.
2021	Spain Masters	Super 300	(Indonesia) Yeremia Rambitan	(Indonesia) Sabar Karyaman Gutama (Indonesia) Muhammad Reza Pahlevi Isfahani	21–15, 18–21, 21–14	(gold) Winner	
2022	Indonesia Masters	Super 100	(Indonesia) Rahmat Hidayat	(China) He Jiting (China) Zhou Haodong	21–18, 21–19	(gold) Winner	

=== BWF International Challenge/Series (4 titles, 2 runners-up) ===
Men's doubles
Year	Tournament	Partner	Opponent	Score	Result	Ref.
2018	Finnish Open	(Indonesia) Rehan Naufal Kusharjanto	(Indonesia) Akbar Bintang Cahyono (Indonesia) Muhammad Reza Pahlevi Isfahani	14–21, 17–21	(silver) Runner-up	
2019	Iran Fajr International	(Indonesia) Yeremia Rambitan	(Indonesia) Adnan Maulana (Indonesia) Ghifari Anandaffa Prihardika	18–21, 13–21	(silver) Runner-up	
2021	Belgian International	(Indonesia) Yeremia Rambitan	(Indonesia) Muhammad Shohibul Fikri (Indonesia) Bagas Maulana	21–18, 22–20	(gold) Winner	
2022 (II)	Indonesia International	(Indonesia) Rahmat Hidayat	(Japan) Hiroki Okamura (Japan) Masayuki Onodera	23–21, 16–21, 21–15	(gold) Winner	
2025	Guatemala International	(Australia) Jack Yu	(United States) Samuel Wales Li (United States) Joshua Yang	21–14, 21–15	(gold) Winner	
2025	El Salvador International	(Australia) Jack Yu	(United States) Ryan Nibu (United States) Srinivas Subash	Walkover	(gold) Winner	

BWF International Challenge tournament
BWF International Series tournament
BWF Future Series tournament

=== BWF Junior International (1 title, 3 runners-up) ===
Boys' doubles
Year	Tournament	Partner	Opponent	Score	Result	Ref.
2017	Jakarta Junior International	(Indonesia) Haffiz Nur Adila	(Indonesia) Ghifari Anandaffa Prihardika (Indonesia) Ferdian Mahardika Ranialdy	21–18, 14–21, 15–21	(silver) Runner-up	
2018	India Junior International	(Indonesia) Ghifari Anandaffa Prihardika	(Indonesia) Leo Rolly Carnando (Indonesia) Daniel Marthin	12–21, 14–21	(silver) Runner-up	
2018	Malaysia International Junior Open	(Indonesia) Rehan Naufal Kusharjanto	(Indonesia) Leo Rolly Carnando (Indonesia) Daniel Marthin	17–21, 12–21	(silver) Runner-up	

Mixed doubles
Year	Tournament	Partner	Opponent	Score	Result	Ref.
2018	India Junior International	(Indonesia) Ribka Sugiarto	(Indonesia) Leo Rolly Carnando (Indonesia) Metya Inayah Cindiani	21–16, 21–12	(gold) Winner	

BWF Junior International Grand Prix tournament
BWF Junior International Challenge tournament
BWF Junior International Series tournament
BWF Junior Future Series tournament

== Performance timeline ==
Key

W	Won	F	Finalist	SF	Semi-finalist
QF	Quarter-finalist	#R	Rounds 4, 3, 2, 1	RR	Round-robin stage
Q#	Qualification round	A	Absent	w/d	Withdrew
G	Gold	S	Silver	B	Bronze
NH	Not held	N/A	Not applicable	DNQ	Did not qualify

=== National team ===
- Junior level

Team events	2018
Asian Junior Championships	B
World Junior Championships	B

- Senior level

Team events	2021	2022	2023	Ref
SEA Games	B	NH	G	
Asia Team Championships	NH	S	NH	
Asia Mixed Team Championships	NH		QF	

=== Individual competitions ===
==== Junior level ====
Boys' doubles

Events	2018	Ref
Asian Junior Championships	B	
World Junior Championships	2R	

Mixed doubles

Events	2017	2018
Asian Junior Championships	2R	QF
World Junior Championships	A	QF

==== Senior level ====
===== Men's doubles =====
Events	2021	2022	2023	Ref
SEA Games	S	NH	G	
Asian Championships	NH	G	A	

Tournament	BWF World Tour									Best	Ref
Tournament	2018	2019	2020	2021	2022	2023	2024	2025	2026	Best	Ref
Malaysia Open	A		NH		A	2R	A			2R ('23)	
Indonesia Masters	A			QF	2R	1R	A			QF ('21)	
Thailand Masters	A			NH		QF	A			QF ('23)	
All England Open	A				1R	1R	A			1R ('22, 23)	
Swiss Open	A		NH	2R	SF	1R	A			SF ('22)	
Ruichang China Masters	A		NH			A			1R	1R ('26)	
Orléans Masters	1R	2R	NH	A		2R	A			2R ('19, '23)	
Thailand Open	A		1R	NH	A	2R	A			2R ('20, '23)	
Thailand Open	A		2R	NH	A	2R	A			2R ('20, '23)	
Malaysia Masters	A			NH	A	1R	A			1R ('23)	
Singapore Open	A		NH		w/d	2R	A			2R ('23)	
Indonesia Open	A		NH	2R	QF	SF	A			SF ('23)	
Australian Open	A		NH		A	QF	QF	A		QF ('23, '24)	
Japan Open	A		NH		A	1R	A			1R ('23)	
China Open	A		NH			2R	A			2R ('23)	
Korea Masters	A		NH		1R	A				1R ('22)	
China Masters	A		NH			QF	A			QF ('23)	
Indonesia Masters Super 100	1R	2R	NH		W	A				W ('22)	
Vietnam Open	A	2R	NH		A					2R ('19)	
Arctic Open	N/A		NH			QF	A			QF ('23)	
Denmark Open	A			2R	A	1R	A			2R ('21)	
French Open	A		NH	A		1R	A			1R ('23)	
Hylo Open	A			SF	A					SF ('21)	
Korea Open	A		NH		2R	2R	A			2R ('22, '23)	
Japan Masters	NH					2R	A			2R ('23)	
Hong Kong Open	A		NH			2R	A			2R ('23)	
World Tour Finals	DNQ			RR	DNQ					RR ('21)	
Hyderabad Open	A	1R	NH							1R ('19)	
Russian Open	A	2R	NH							2R ('19)	
Spain Masters	A		1R	W	NH	QF	A	NH		W ('21)	
Year-end ranking	235	62	65	22	25	18	156	189		11	
Tournament	2018	2019	2020	2021	2022	2023	2024	2025	2026	Best	Ref

===== Mixed doubles =====
Tournament	BWF World Tour							Best
Tournament	2018	2019	2020	2021	2022	2023	2024	Best
Orléans Masters	1R	A	NH	A				1R ('18)
Australian Open	A		NH		A		1R	1R ('24)
Indonesia Masters Super 100	2R	A	NH		A			2R ('18)
Year-end ranking	239	—N/a	—N/a	—N/a	—N/a	—N/a		229
