= 2019 SaarLorLux Open =

2019 badminton tournament in Saarbrücken

Tournament details
- Dates: 29 October – 3 November
- Level: Super 100
- Total prize money: US$75,000
- Venue: Saarlandhalle
- Location: Saarbrücken, Germany

Champions
- Men's singles: (India) Lakshya Sen
- Women's singles: (China) Li Yun
- Men's doubles: (China) Di Zijian (China) Wang Chang
- Women's doubles: (China) Liu Xuanxuan (China) Xia Yuting
- Mixed doubles: (China) Guo Xinwa (China) Zhang Shuxian

The 2019 SaarLorLux Open was a badminton tournament which took place at Saarlandhalle in Saarbrücken, Germany, from 29 October to 3 November 2019 and had a total prize of $75,000.

== Tournament ==
The 2019 SaarLorLux Open was the tenth and last Super 100 tournament of the 2019 BWF World Tour and also part of the SaarLorLux Open championships, which has been held since 1988. This tournament was organized by German Badminton Association and sanctioned by the BWF.

=== Venue ===
This international tournament was held at Saarlandhalle in Saarbrücken, Saarland, Germany.

=== Point distribution ===
Below is the point distribution table for each phase of the tournament based on the BWF points system for the BWF Tour Super 100 event.

Winner	Runner-up	3/4	5/8	9/16	17/32	33/64	65/128
5,500	4,680	3,850	3,030	2,110	1,290	510	240

=== Prize money ===
The total prize money for this tournament was US$75,000. Distribution of prize money was in accordance with BWF regulations.

Event	Winner	Finals	Semi-finals	Quarter-finals	Last 16
Singles	$5,625	$2,850	$1,087.50	$450	$262.5
Doubles	$5,925	$2,850	$1,050	$543.75	$281.25

== Men's singles ==
=== Seeds ===
1. (Netherlands) Mark Caljouw (withdrew)
2. (Israel) Misha Zilberman (second round)
3. (France) Lucas Corvée (third round)
4. (Brazil) Ygor Coelho de Oliveira (third round)
5. (England) Toby Penty (semi-finals)
6. (France) Toma Junior Popov (second round)
7. (Chinese Taipei) Lin Yu-hsien (third round)
8. (India) Lakshya Sen (champion)

=== Finals ===
Semi-finals
(India) Kiran George	13	21	9
8	(India) Lakshya Sen	21	14	21
(China) Weng Hongyang	21	21
5	(England) Toby Penty	12	11

Final
8	(India) Lakshya Sen	17	21	21
(China) Weng Hongyang	21	18	16

=== Top half ===
==== Section 1 ====
First Round
(Denmark) D Kim	17	13
(Austria) W Gnedt	21	21
(China) Lei LX	21	21
PFQ	(Denmark) J Godt	16	16
(India) K George	21	21
(China) Liu HC	17	13
(Netherlands) J Kweekel	22	21
(Belgium) J Carraggi	20	13

Second Round
PFQ	(England) E Rose	16	13
(Austria) W Gnedt	21	21
(France) C Popov	21	12	21
(China) Lei LX	17	21	13
6	(France) T J Popov	18	11
(India) K George	21	21
Q2	(Germany) C Klauer	14	15
(Netherlands) J Kweekel	21	21

Third Round
(Austria) W Gnedt	15	15
(France) C Popov	21	21
(India) K George	21	21
(Netherlands) J Kweekel	14	16

Quarter-finals
(France) C Popov	14	21
(India) K George	21	23

==== Section 2 ====
First Round
(Ukraine) A Pochtarov	13	21	21
(Malaysia) Lim C W	21	15	8
Q8	(Germany) S Hsiao	15	23	17
(Germany) M Weißkirchen	21	21	21
PFQ	(Germany) F Hammes	17	14
(Finland) E Heino	21	21
(Romania) C V Filimon	21	21
(Uzbekistan) A Savatyugin	12	13

Second Round
3	(France) L Corvée	21	21
(Ukraine) A Pochtarov	12	16
Q6	(Germany) L Resch	19	14
(Germany) M Weißkirchen	21	21
8	(India) L Sen	21	18	22
(Finland) E Heino	18	21	20
(Germany) L Schänzler	21	21
(Romania) C V Filimon	11	19

Third Round
3	(France) L Corvée	15	16
(Germany) M Weißkirchen	21	21
8	(India) L Sen	w	/	o
(Germany) L Schänzler

Quarter-finals
(Germany) M Weißkirchen	13	16
8	(India) L Sen	21	21

=== Bottom half ===
==== Section 3 ====
First Round
(Uzbekistan) A Bakhshullaev	15	4
(Chinese Taipei) Chen C-t	21	21
Q1	(Germany) T Fuchs	9	18
Q5	(Austria) R Gnedt	21	21
Q7	(Germany) J Scheller	17	19
(Denmark) K Bruun	21	21
Q3	(Germany) A Kirste	4	6
Q4	(Germany) B Holtschke	21	21

Second Round
(Chinese Taipei) Chen C-t	12	9
(China) Weng HY	21	21
Q5	(Austria) R Gnedt	14	6
7	(Chinese Taipei) Lin Y-h	21	21
(Denmark) K Bruun	21	21
(China) Bai YP	13	15
Q4	(Germany) B Holtschke	21	13	19
4	(Brazil) Y Coelho de Oliveira	13	21	21

Third Round
(China) Weng HY	21	21
7	(Chinese Taipei) Lin Y-h	14	10
(Denmark) K Bruun	23	21
4	(Brazil) Y Coelho de Oliveira	21	13

Quarter-finals
(China) Weng HY	21	21
(Denmark) K Bruun	13	7

==== Section 4 ====
First Round
(Malaysia) Chong Y H	21	22
(Finland) J Korhonen	14	20
(Republic of Ireland) J Magee	21	21
(Sweden) F Burestedt	18	9
(India) B.M. R Bharadwaj	21	21
PFQ	(Belgium) R Scheurkogel	15	9
(Republic of Ireland) N Nguyen	21	21
(France) A Merklé	18	15

Second Round
(Malaysia) Chong Y H	15	14
(India) M Manjunath	21	21
(Republic of Ireland) J Magee	10	12
5	(England) T Penty	21	21
(India) B.M. R Bharadwaj	21	21
(Germany) K Schäfer	13	15
(Republic of Ireland) N Nguyen	21	21
2	(Israel) M Zilberman	15	12

Third Round
(India) M Manjunath	21	19	11
5	(England) T Penty	15	21	21
(India) B.M. R Bharadwaj	18	14
(Republic of Ireland) N Nguyen	21	21

Quarter-finals
5	(England) T Penty	21	21
(Republic of Ireland) N Nguyen	9	15

== Women's singles ==
=== Seeds ===
1. (India) Saina Nehwal (withdrew)
2. (Spain) Carolina Marín (withdrew)
3. (Germany) Yvonne Li (semi-finals)
4. (Switzerland) Sabrina Jaquet (second round)
5. (Belgium) Lianne Tan (quarter-finals)
6. (Denmark) Julie Dawall Jakobsen (second round)
7. (China) Ji Shuting (withdrew)
8. (Israel) Ksenia Polikarpova (second round)

=== Finals ===
Semi-finals
(China) Li Yun	21	21
(Russia) Natalia Perminova	8	7
3	(Germany) Yvonne Li	21	11	14
(Denmark) Line Christophersen	16	21	21

Final
(China) Li Yun	21	21
(Denmark) Line Christophersen	12	13

=== Top half ===
==== Section 1 ====
First Round
PFQ	(Germany) A Diks	8	19
(Germany) F Deprez	21	21
(Netherlands) S de Visch Eijbergen	w	/	o
Q1
6	(Denmark) J D Jakobsen	21	21
(Ukraine) M Ilyinskaya	18	14
(Germany) B Stepper	14	14
(China) Li Y	21	21

Second Round
(Germany) F Deprez	11	13
(Netherlands) S de Visch Eijbergen	21	21
6	(Denmark) J D Jakobsen	21	10
(China) Li Y	23	21

Quarter-finals
(Netherlands) S de Visch Eijbergen	10	18
(China) Li Y	21	21

==== Section 2 ====
First Round
4	(Switzerland) S Jaquet	21	21
(Germany) T Isenberg	13	14
(Russia) N Perminova	21	21
(Germany) A Molitor	7	10
5	(Belgium) L Tan	21	18	21
(Wales) J Hart	19	21	15
Q3	(Germany) A-K Spöri	21	14	15
(Estonia) K Kuuba	17	21	21

Second Round
4	(Switzerland) S Jaquet	3	20
(Russia) N Perminova	21	22
5	(Belgium) L Tan	21	21
(Estonia) K Kuuba	7	18

Quarter-finals
(Russia) N Perminova	19	22	21
5	(Belgium) L Tan	21	20	19

=== Bottom half ===
==== Section 3 ====
First Round
Q2	(Germany) A-K Hippchen	8	17
(Ukraine) N Voytsekh	21	21
(Germany) M Wilson	21	13	15
8	(Israel) K Polikarpova	16	21	21
Q4	(Switzerland) N Fankhauser	18	14
(Slovakia) M Repiská	21	21
(Bulgaria) M Mitsova	18	23
3	(Germany) Y Li	21	25

Second Round
(Ukraine) N Voytsekh	21	21
8	(Israel) K Polikarpova	13	19
(Slovakia) M Repiská	14	11
3	(Germany) Y Li	21	21

Quarter-finals
(Ukraine) N Voytsekh	12	13
3	(Germany) Y Li	21	21

==== Section 4 ====
First Round
(Denmark) L Christophersen	21	22
(Russia) A Semenova	11	20
(Denmark) I A Andersen	21	21
PFQ	(Latvia) M Radovska	6	15
(China) Zheng SY	21	21
(Finland) A Mikkelä	18	18
(Peru) D Macías	21	11
PFQ	(Switzerland) I Dickhaeuser	13	4^{r}

Second Round
(Denmark) L Christophersen	21	21
(Denmark) I A Andersen	19	13
(China) Zheng SY	21	21
(Peru) D Macías	16	15

Quarter-finals
(Denmark) L Christophersen	21	21
(China) Zheng SY	18	12

== Men's doubles ==
=== Seeds ===
1. (England) Marcus Ellis / Chris Langridge (quarter-finals)
2. (Germany) Mark Lamsfuß / Marvin Emil Seidel (withdrew)
3. (England) Ben Lane / Sean Vendy (semi-finals)
4. (Scotland) Alexander Dunn / Adam Hall (quarter-finals)
5. (China) Di Zijian / Wang Chang (champions)
6. (Germany) Jones Ralfy Jansen / Peter Käsbauer (semi-finals)
7. (Denmark) Mathias Bay-Smidt / Lasse Mølhede (final)
8. (Denmark) Mads Pieler Kolding / Carsten Mogensen (second round)

=== Finals ===
Semi-finals
5	(China) Di Zijian (China) Wang Chang	21	15	21
6	(Germany) Jones Ralfy Jansen (Germany) Peter Käsbauer	15	21	12
3	(England) Ben Lane (England) Sean Vendy	18	20
7	(Denmark) Mathias Bay-Smidt (Denmark) Lasse Mølhede	21	22

Final
5	(China) Di Zijian (China) Wang Chang	21	21
7	(Denmark) Mathias Bay-Smidt (Denmark) Lasse Mølhede	17	15

=== Top half ===
==== Section 1 ====
First Round
(Chinese Taipei) Lee F-c (Chinese Taipei) Lee F-j	21	21
(Uzbekistan) A Bakhshullaev (Uzbekistan) A Savatyugin	17	8
5	(China) Di ZJ (China) Wang C	23	21
(France) E Adam (France) J Maio	21	19
(China) Liang WK (China) Shang YC	21	21
(Netherlands) R Jille (England) G Mairs	12	18

Second Round
1	(England) M Ellis (England) C Langridge	21	21
(Chinese Taipei) Lee F-c (Chinese Taipei) Lee F-j	14	18
5	(China) Di ZJ (China) Wang C	21	19	21
(China) Liang WK (China) Shang YC	18	21	15

Quarter-finals
1	(England) M Ellis (England) C Langridge	19	21	15
5	(China) Di ZJ (China) Wang C	21	14	21

==== Section 2 ====
First Round
4	(Scotland) A Dunn (Scotland) A Hall	21	21
(Germany) H Graalmann (Germany) P Scheiel	16	14
(Malaysia) A Ameer (Malaysia) M I Zainal	21	14	16
(India) Vaibhaav (India) P Raj	16	21	21
6	(Germany) J R Jansen (Germany) P Käsbauer	21	21
(Germany) F Kruchten (Switzerland) I Santoro	3	4
(Republic of Ireland) J Magee (Republic of Ireland) P Reynolds	17	15
(Germany) B Geiss (Germany) J C Völker	21	21

Second Round
4	(Scotland) A Dunn (Scotland) A Hall	21	21
(India) Vaibhaav (India) P Raj	9	8
6	(Germany) J R Jansen (Germany) P Käsbauer	21	21
(Germany) B Geiss (Germany) J C Völker	16	17

Quarter-finals
4	(Scotland) A Dunn (Scotland) A Hall	26	21	19
6	(Germany) J R Jansen (Germany) P Käsbauer	28	19	21

=== Bottom half ===
==== Section 3 ====
First Round
(France) M Briot (Belgium) J Van Nieuwkerke
(France) S Corvée (France) W Villeger	w	/	o
(China) Fan QY (China) Ren XY	21	17	11
8	(Denmark) M P Kolding (Denmark) C Mogensen	14	21	21
(Germany) D Hess (Germany) J Pistorius	7^{r}
(Germany) T Fuchs (Germany) T Mund	4
(Denmark) J Eipe (Denmark) R Kjær
3	(England) B Lane (England) S Vendy	w	/	o

Second Round
(France) S Corvée (France) W Villeger	21	18	21
8	(Denmark) M P Kolding (Denmark) C Mogensen	18	21	18
(Germany) T Fuchs (Germany) T Mund	14	13
3	(England) B Lane (England) S Vendy	21	21

Quarter-finals
(France) S Corvée (France) W Villeger	21	15	15
3	(England) B Lane (England) S Vendy	19	21	21

==== Section 4 ====
First Round
(Germany) J Lohau (Germany) J Scheller	14	11
(Chinese Taipei) Liao K-h (Chinese Taipei) Po L-w	21	21
(France) C Popov (France) T J Popov	21	16	14
7	(Denmark) M Bay-Smidt (Denmark) L Mølhede	16	21	21
(Germany) F Hammes (Germany) C Klauer	20	21	21
(Russia) V Nikulov (Russia) A Serpionov	22	11	9
(France) F Delrue (France) K Lovang	w	/	o
2	(Germany) M Lamsfuß (Germany) M E Seidel

Second Round
(Chinese Taipei) Liao K-h (Chinese Taipei) Po L-w	19	19
7	(Denmark) M Bay-Smidt (Denmark) L Mølhede	21	21
(Germany) F Hammes (Germany) C Klauer	21	19	21
(France) F Delrue (France) K Lovang	14	21	14

Quarter-finals
7	(Denmark) M Bay-Smidt (Denmark) L Mølhede	21	21
(Germany) F Hammes (Germany) C Klauer	12	9

== Women's doubles ==
=== Seeds ===
1. (Denmark) Maiken Fruergaard / Sara Thygesen (semi-finals)
2. (England) Chloe Birch / Lauren Smith (final)
3. (China) Liu Xuanxuan / Xia Yuting (champions)
4. (Germany) Linda Efler / Isabel Herttrich (semi-finals)
5. (India) Pooja Dandu / Sanjana Santosh (second round)
6. (Russia) Anastasiia Akchurina / Olga Morozova (quarter-finals)
7. (China) Chen Xiaofei / Zhou Chaomin (second round)
8. (England) Jenny Moore / Victoria Williams (quarter-finals)

=== Finals ===
Semi-finals
1	(Denmark) Maiken Fruergaard (Denmark) Sara Thygesen	14	11
3	(China) Liu Xuanxuan (China) Xia Yuting	21	21
4	(Germany) Linda Efler (Germany) Isabel Herttrich	22	19
2	(England) Chloe Birch (England) Lauren Smith	24	21

Final
3	(China) Liu Xuanxuan (China) Xia Yuting	21	21
2	(England) Chloe Birch (England) Lauren Smith	16	13

=== Top half ===
==== Section 1 ====
First Round
(France) S Bauer (France) J Moinard	11	10
(Germany) E Janssens (Germany) K Ostermeyer	21	21

Second Round
1	(Denmark) M Fruergaard (Denmark) S Thygesen	21	21
(Germany) A Diks (Germany) A Molitor	9	16
8	(England) J Moore (England) V Williams	21	21
(Germany) E Janssens (Germany) K Ostermeyer	17	17

Quarter-finals
1	(Denmark) M Fruergaard (Denmark) S Thygesen	16	21	21
8	(England) J Moore (England) V Williams	21	17	15

==== Section 2 ====
First Round
(Germany) J Petrikowski (Germany) F Volkmann	17	15
(Germany) A Jäger (Germany) S Küspert	21	21
(Denmark) J Finne-Ipsen (Denmark) M Surrow	21	21
(Germany) E Moszczynski (Germany) L Schwarz	8	12

Second Round
3	(China) Liu XX (China) Xia YT	21	21
(Germany) A Jäger (Germany) S Küspert	14	11
5	(India) P Dandu (India) S Santosh	17	21	14
(Denmark) J Finne-Ipsen (Denmark) M Surrow	21	17	21

Quarter-finals
3	(China) Liu XX (China) Xia YT	21	21
(Denmark) J Finne-Ipsen (Denmark) M Surrow	8	9

=== Bottom half ===
==== Section 3 ====
First Round
(Belgium) L Jaques (Germany) L Käpplein	10	11
(China) Huang J (China) Zhang SX	21	21
(Switzerland) N Fankhauser (Netherlands) I Tabeling	21	11	19
(France) V Hériau (France) M Lambert	12	21	21

Second Round
(China) Huang J (China) Zhang SX	21	21
7	(China) Chen XF (China) Zhou CM	15	18
(France) V Hériau (France) M Lambert	11	20
4	(Germany) L Efler (Germany) I Herttrich	21	22

Quarter-finals
(China) Huang J (China) Zhang SX	23	17
4	(Germany) L Efler (Germany) I Herttrich	25	21

==== Section 4 ====
First Round
(Germany) T Isenberg (Germany) B Stepper	10	16
(Peru) D Macías (Peru) D Nishimura	21	21
(Ukraine) M Ilyinskaya (Ukraine) Y Zharka	22	22
(Germany) L Kaminski (Germany) H Pohl	20	20

Second Round
(Peru) D Macías (Peru) D Nishimura	11	18
6	(Russia) A Akchurina (Russia) O Morozova	21	21
(Ukraine) M Ilyinskaya (Ukraine) Y Zharka	19	11
2	(England) C Birch (England) L Smith	21	21

Quarterfinals
6	(Russia) A Akchurina (Russia) O Morozova	17	16
2	(England) C Birch (England) L Smith	21	21

== Mixed doubles ==
=== Seeds ===
1. (England) Marcus Ellis / Lauren Smith (quarter-finals)
2. (Germany) Mark Lamsfuß / Isabel Herttrich (withdrew)
3. (Germany) Marvin Emil Seidel / Linda Efler (quarter-finals)
4. (Republic of Ireland) Sam Magee / Chloe Magee (quarter-finals)
5. (China) Ren Xiangyu / Zhou Chaomin (final)
6. (China) Guo Xinwa / Zhang Shuxian (champions)
7. (China) Dong Weijie / Chen Xiaofei (semi-finals)
8. (Denmark) Niclas Nøhr / Sara Thygesen (semi-finals)

=== Finals ===
Semi-finals
8	(Denmark) Niclas Nøhr (Denmark) Sara Thygesen	11	20
5	(China) Ren Xiangyu (China) Zhou Chaomin	21	22
7	(China) Dong Weijie (China) Chen Xiaofei	16	22
6	(China) Guo Xinwa (China) Zhang Shuxian	21	24

Final
5	(China) Ren Xiangyu (China) Zhou Chaomin	18	19
6	(China) Guo Xinwa (China) Zhang Shuxian	21	21

=== Top half ===
==== Section 1 ====
First Round
(Denmark) M Bay-Smidt (Denmark) R Søby
(Germany) J C Völker (Germany) E Janssens	w	/	o
8	(Denmark) N Nøhr (Denmark) S Thygesen	21	23
(Germany) J R Jansen (Germany) K Ostermeyer	18	21
(Scotland) A Hall (Scotland) J MacPherson	21	21
(France) J Maio (France) J Moinard	8	12

Second Round
1	(England) M Ellis (England) L Smith	21	21
(Germany) J C Völker (Germany) E Janssens	13	13
8	(Denmark) N Nøhr (Denmark) S Thygesen	21	16	21
(Scotland) A Hall (Scotland) J MacPherson	15	21	19

Quarter-finals
1	(England) M Ellis (England) L Smith	15	15
8	(Denmark) N Nøhr (Denmark) S Thygesen	21	21

==== Section 2 ====
First Round
4	(Republic of Ireland) S Magee (Republic of Ireland) C Magee	21	21
(Germany) B Geiss (Germany) E Moszczynski	17	15
(France) E Adam (France) M Lambert	21	13	21
(India) R Kapoor (India) S Santosh	19	21	14
5	(China) Ren XY (China) Zhou CM	21	21
(Switzerland) I Santoro (Latvia) M Radovska	6	6
(China) Fan QY (China) Huang J	21	21
(Germany) J Lohau (Germany) A Diks	13	12

Second Round
4	(Republic of Ireland) S Magee (Republic of Ireland) C Magee	21	21
(France) E Adam (France) M Lambert	18	17
5	(China) Ren XY (China) Zhou CM	21	21
(China) Fan QY (China) Huang J	14	8

Quarter-finals
4	(Republic of Ireland) S Magee (Republic of Ireland) C Magee	15	19
5	(China) Ren XY (China) Zhou CM	21	21

=== Bottom half ===
==== Section 3 ====
First Round
(Germany) H Graalmann (Germany) A Jäger	22	12	21
(Germany) J Pistorius (Germany) J Petrikowski	20	21	10
(Germany) C Klauer (Germany) A Molitor	13	14
7	(China) Dong WJ (China) Chen XF	21	21
(Germany) P Käsbauer (Germany) L Käpplein	21	12	21
(France) W Villeger (France) S Bauer	14	21	17
(England) G Mairs (England) V Williams	12	3
3	(Germany) M E Seidel (Germany) L Efler	21	21

Second Round
(Germany) H Graalmann (Germany) A Jäger	16	14
7	(China) Dong WJ (China) Chen XF	21	21
(Germany) P Käsbauer (Germany) L Käpplein	11	12
3	(Germany) M E Seidel (Germany) L Efler	21	21

Quarter-finals
7	(China) Dong WJ (China) Chen XF	21	21
3	(Germany) M E Seidel (Germany) L Efler	18	19

==== Section 4 ====
First Round
(Germany) F Kruchten (Germany) A-K Hippchen	12	8
(Belgium) J Van Nieuwkerke (Belgium) L Jaques	21	21
(France) F Delrue (France) V Hériau	11	15
6	(China) Guo XW (China) Zhang SX	21	21
(Russia) V Nikulov (Russia) A Semenova	12	23
(Germany) P Scheiel (Germany) F Volkmann	21	25

Second Round
(Belgium) J Van Nieuwkerke (Belgium) L Jaques	13	16
6	(China) Guo XW (China) Zhang SX	21	21
(Germany) P Scheiel (Germany) F Volkmann	w	/	o
2	(Germany) M Lamsfuß (Germany) I Herttrich

Quarter-finals
6	(China) Guo XW (China) Zhang SX	21	21
(Germany) P Scheiel (Germany) F Volkmann	15	16

Preceded by 2019 Macau Open	BWF World Tour; 2019 BWF season	Succeeded by 2019 Fuzhou China Open
