= 2018 Badminton Asia Junior Championships – Boys' doubles =

Badminton championships

Tournament details
- Dates: 18–22 July 2017
- Edition: 21
- Venue: Jaya Raya Sports Hall Training Center
- Location: Jakarta, Indonesia

The boys' doubles tournament of the 2018 Badminton Asia Junior Championships was held from July 18 to 22. The defending champion from the last edition were Di Zijian and Wang Chang from China. Di / Wang of China and Shin Tae-yang / Wang Chan of South Korea are the top two seeded this year.

== Seeded ==
1. (China) Di Zijian / Wang Chang (champions)
2. (South Korea) Shin Tae-yang / Wang Chan (semifinals)
3. (China) Liang Weikeng / Shang Yichen (final)
4. (Indonesia) Ghifari Anandaffa Prihardika / Pramudya Kusumawardana (semifinals)
5. (China) Guo Xinwa / Liu Shiwen (quarterfinals)
6. (Singapore) Abel Tan Wen Xing / Toh Han Zhuo (second round)
7. (Thailand) Thanawin Madee / Wachirawit Sothon (third round)
8. (Japan) Hiroki Midorikawa / Hiroki Nakayama (second round)

== Draw ==
=== Finals ===
Quarterfinals
1	(China) Di Zijian (China) Wang Chang	21	21
(India) Manjit Singh Khwairakpam (India) Dingku Singh Konthoujam	7	15
4	(Indonesia) Ghifari Anandaffa Prihardika (Indonesia) Pramudya Kusumawardana	21	21
(Malaysia) Chang Yee Jun (Malaysia) Choong Hon Jian	17	9
(Hong Kong) Chow Hin Long (Hong Kong) Lui Chun Wai	15	10
3	(China) Liang Weikeng (China) Shang Yichen	21	21
5	(China) Guo Xinwa (China) Liu Shiwen	18	15
2	(South Korea) Shin Tae-yang (South Korea) Wang Chan	21	21

Semifinals
1	(China) Di Zijian (China) Wang Chang	21	22
4	(Indonesia) Ghifari Anandaffa Prihardika (Indonesia) Pramudya Kusumawardana	15	20
3	(China) Liang Weikeng (China) Shang Yichen	21	26
2	(South Korea) Shin Tae-yang (South Korea) Wang Chan	18	24

Final
1	(China) Di Zijian (China) Wang Chang	18	24	21
3	(China) Liang Weikeng (China) Shang Yichen	21	22	19

=== Top half ===
==== Section 1 ====
First round
(Sri Lanka) T N Ambegoda (Sri Lanka) V Fernando	14	7
(Indonesia) S D Arafixqli (Indonesia) S D Arafixqli	21	21
(Indonesia) M C Chaniago (Indonesia) H A Hanifa	20	21
(India) M S Khwairakpam (India) D S Konthoujam	22	23

Second round
1	(China) Di ZJ (China) Wang C	21	21
(South Korea) Ki D-j (South Korea) Kim S-h	15	19
(Chinese Taipei) Chang F-c (Chinese Taipei) Chen Z-r	19	19
(Indonesia) S D Arafixqli (Indonesia) S D Arafixqli	21	21
7	(Thailand) T Madee (Thailand) W Sothon	21	21
(Mongolia) S Enkhbat (Mongolia) T Gombodorj	5	5
(Hong Kong) Ko S H (Hong Kong) Mak P N	14	15
(India) M S Khwairakpam (India) D S Konthoujam	21	21

Third round
1	(China) Di ZJ (China) Wang C	21	21
(Indonesia) S D Arafixqli (Indonesia) S D Arafixqli	13	13
7	(Thailand) T Madee (Thailand) W Sothon	22	21	17
(India) M S Khwairakpam (India) D S Konthoujam	24	16	21

Quarterfinal
1	(China) Di ZJ (China) Wang C	21	21
(India) M S Khwairakpam (India) D S Konthoujam	7	15

==== Section 2 ====
First round
(Saudi Arabia) A Alharthi (Saudi Arabia) A Alothman	9	7
(Macau) Che P N (Macau) Pui P F	21	21
(Malaysia) Chang Y J (Malaysia) Choong H J	21	21
(Bangladesh) S S M S Ullah (Bangladesh) A Solaiman	7	15
(Kazakhstan) D Abdullayev (Kazakhstan) D Panarin	11	8
(Chinese Taipei) Wei C-w (Chinese Taipei) Wu G-x	21	21

Second round
4	(Indonesia) G A Prihardika (Indonesia) P Kusumawardana	21	21
(South Korea) Oh S-w (South Korea) Park G-w	12	19
(Singapore) D M Ng W S (Singapore) A Yong C S	21	21
(Macau) Che P N (Macau) Pui P F	19	13
8	(Japan) H Midorikawa (Japan) H Nakayama	17	24	16
(Malaysia) Chang Y J (Malaysia) Choong H J	21	22	21
(India) S R Bomboji (India) A Chandran	14	15
(Chinese Taipei) Wei C-w (Chinese Taipei) Wu G-x	21	21

Third round
4	(Indonesia) G A Prihardika (Indonesia) P Kusumawardana	21	16	21
(Singapore) D M Ng W S (Singapore) A Yong C S	12	21	8
(Malaysia) Chang Y J (Malaysia) Choong H J	21	21
(Chinese Taipei) Wei C-w (Chinese Taipei) Wu G-x	14	14

Quarterfinal
4	(Indonesia) G A Prihardika (Indonesia) P Kusumawardana	21	21
(Malaysia) Chang Y J (Malaysia) Choong H J	17	9

=== Bottom half ===
==== Section 3 ====
First round
(Japan) M Ikebata (Japan) T Kawamoto	16	21	17
(Thailand) A Teerawiwat (Thailand) K Vitidsarn	21	16	21
(Hong Kong) Chow H L (Hong Kong) Lui C W	21	21
(Indonesia) A Kusuma (Indonesia) B F Sani	14	18
(Vietnam) Nguyen A G H (Vietnam) Nguyen H D	13	15
(Malaysia) Chua Y C (Malaysia) Lwi S H	21	21

Second round
(Thailand) A Teerawiwat (Thailand) K Vitidsarn	21	21
(India) V V G Panjala (India) S S K Podile	19	14
(Hong Kong) Chow H L (Hong Kong) Lui C W	14	21	21
6	(Singapore) A Tan W X (Singapore) Toh H Z	21	17	13
(Malaysia) Chua Y C (Malaysia) Lwi S H	21	21
(Macau) Lee R H (Macau) Leong I C	15	18
(Saudi Arabia) M Alghamdi (Saudi Arabia) N Alghamdi	1	4
3	(China) Liang WK (China) Shang YC	21	21

Third round
(Thailand) A Teerawiwat (Thailand) K Vitidsarn	19	21
(Hong Kong) Chow H L (Hong Kong) Lui C W	21	23
(Malaysia) Chua Y C (Malaysia) Lwi S H	13	21	14
3	(China) Liang WK (China) Shang YC	21	15	21

Quarterfinal
(Hong Kong) Chow H L (Hong Kong) Lui C W	15	10
3	(China) Liang WK (China) Shang YC	21	21

==== Section 4 ====
First round
(Japan) T Kato (Japan) Y Takei	21	24	21
(Indonesia) L R Carnando (Indonesia) D Marthin	23	22	19
(Thailand) R Makkasasitorn (Thailand) W Phakjarung	21	21
(Hong Kong) J Gunawan (Hong Kong) J Wang	11	14
(Myanmar) Kaung A (Myanmar) Naing Z Y	11	10
(Bangladesh) M A H Lukman (Bangladesh) G Singha	21	21

Second round
(Japan) T Kato (Japan) Y Takei	21	16	11
(Chinese Taipei) Chang H-c (Chinese Taipei) Lin Y-c	16	21	21
(Thailand) R Makkasasitorn (Thailand) W Phakjarung	20	10
5	(China) Guo XW (China) Liu SW	22	21
(Bangladesh) M A H Lukman (Bangladesh) G Singha	22	21
(Sri Lanka) L De Silva (Sri Lanka) C Dias	20	16
(Malaysia) Ooi J D (Malaysia) Yap R K	26	16
2	(South Korea) Shin T-y (South Korea) Wang C	28	21

Third round
(Chinese Taipei) Chang H-c (Chinese Taipei) Lin Y-c	11	21	13
5	(China) Guo XW (China) Liu SW	21	15	21
(Bangladesh) M A H Lukman (Bangladesh) G Singha	6	9
2	(South Korea) Shin T-y (South Korea) Wang C	21	21

Quarterfinal
5	(China) Guo XW (China) Liu SW	18	15
2	(South Korea) Shin T-y (South Korea) Wang C	21	21
