= 2018 Lingshui China Masters =

Tournament details
- Dates: 10–15 April
- Edition: 1st
- Level: Super 100
- Total prize money: US$75,000
- Venue: Agile Stadium
- Location: Lingshui, Hainan, China

Champions
- Men's singles: (Chinese Taipei) Lin Yu-hsien
- Women's singles: (China) Li Xuerui
- Men's doubles: (China) Han Chengkai (China) Zhou Haodong
- Women's doubles: (China) Du Yue (China) Li Yinhui
- Mixed doubles: (China) Guo Xinwa (China) Liu Xuanxuan

The 2018 Lingshui China Masters was a badminton tournament which took place at Agile Stadium in China from 10 to 15 April 2018 and had a total purse of $75,000.

== Tournament ==
The 2018 Lingshui China Masters was the second Super 100 tournament of the 2018 BWF World Tour and also part of the Lingshui China Masters championships. This tournament was organized by the Chinese Badminton Association with the sanction from the Badminton Asia and BWF.

=== Venue ===
This international tournament was held at Agile Stadium which located inside the Lingshui Culture and Sports Square in Lingshui, Hainan, China.

=== Point distribution ===
Below is the point distribution for each phase of the tournament based on the BWF points system for the BWF Tour Super 100 event.

Winner	Runner-up	3/4	5/8	9/16	17/32	33/64	65/128	129/256
5,500	4,680	3,850	3,030	2,110	1,290	510	240	100

=== Prize money ===
The total prize money for this tournament was US$75,000. Distribution of prize money was in accordance with BWF regulations.

Event	Winner	Finals	Semi-finals	Quarter-finals	Last 16
Singles	$5,625	$2,850	$1,087.50	$450	$262.5
Doubles	$5,925	$2,850	$1,050	$543.75	$281.25

== Men's singles ==
=== Seeds ===
1. (Chinese Taipei) Hsu Jen-hao (third round)
2. (Malaysia) Liew Daren (quarter-finals)
3. (Indonesia) Ihsan Maulana Mustofa (third round)
4. (Malaysia) Lee Zii Jia (second round)
5. (Vietnam) Nguyễn Tiến Minh (second round)
6. (Malaysia) Chong Wei Feng (semi-finals)
7. (Malaysia) Iskandar Zulkarnain (quarter-finals)
8. (Thailand) Pannawit Thongnuam (third round)

=== Finals ===
Semi-finals
(Chinese Taipei) Lin Yu-hsien	21	16	23
6	(Malaysia) Chong Wei Feng	17	21	21
(China) Sun Feixiang	21	12	15
(China) Lu Guangzu	13	21	21

Final
(Chinese Taipei) Lin Yu-hsien	12	21	21
(China) Lu Guangzu	21	12	14

=== Top half ===
==== Section 1 ====
First round
(Chinese Taipei) Lin Y-h	21	21
(Indonesia) F A Kholik	16	14
(Indonesia) S Vicky Angga	21	15	12
(China) Ren PB	19	21	21
(China) Cao YF	21	21
(Chinese Taipei) Lu C-h	18	17

Second round
1	(Chinese Taipei) Hsu J-h	24	19	21
(Indonesia) C A Dwi Wardoyo	22	21	14
(England) Wang YH	13	8
(Chinese Taipei) Lin Y-h	21	21
7	(Malaysia) I Zulkarnain	21	21
(China) Ren PB	17	14
(China) Weng HY	21	21
(China) Cao YF	16	15

Third round
1	(Chinese Taipei) Hsu J-h	24	17	4
(Chinese Taipei) Lin Y-h	22	21	21
7	(Malaysia) I Zulkarnain	21	21
(China) Weng HY	19	9

Quarter-finals
(Chinese Taipei) Lin Y-h	21	17	21
7	(Malaysia) I Zulkarnain	14	21	14

==== Section 2 ====
First round
(Chinese Taipei) Liu W-c	17	9
(Israel) M Zilberman	21	21
(China) Zhou ZQ	21	21
(South Korea) Son S-h	17	16
(China) Liu SM	21	21
(Chile) Q Zheng	12	19
(China) Zezhou Z	12	11
(Chinese Taipei) Yang C-c	21	21

Second round
3	(Indonesia) I M Mustofa	21	21
(Israel) M Zilberman	19	15
(South Korea) Ha Y-w	16	19
(China) Zhou ZQ	21	21
6	(Malaysia) Chong W F	21	21
(China) Liu SM	8	18
(Vietnam) Phạm C C	10	20
(Chinese Taipei) Yang C-c	21	22

Third round
3	(Indonesia) I M Mustofa	16	21	18
(China) Zhou ZQ	21	8	21
6	(Malaysia) Chong W F	21	21
(Chinese Taipei) Yang C-c	18	19

Quarter-finals
(China) Zhou ZQ	18	11
6	(Malaysia) Chong W F	21	21

=== Bottom half ===
==== Section 3 ====
First round
(China) Yu JH	11	11
(Chinese Taipei) Chi Y-j	21	21
(Chinese Taipei) Shih K-c	21	18	11
(China) Liu HC	18	21	21
(China) Sun FX	21	21
(India) A Jayaram	13	11
(India) K Gulshan Kumar	21	11	11
(China) Li SF	14	21	21

Second round
(Chinese Taipei) Chi Y-j	21	8	15
(Indonesia) P A Maulana	17	21	21
(China) Liu HC	21	15	19
8	(Thailand) P Thongnuam	18	21	21
(China) Sun FX	21	21
(Indonesia) A Marteen	16	14
(China) Li SF	21	21
4	(Malaysia) Lee Z J	18	17

Third round
(Indonesia) P A Maulana	19	21	22
8	(Thailand) P Thongnuam	21	11	20
(China) Sun FX	21	21
(China) Li SF	15	16

Quarter-finals
(Indonesia) P A Maulana	15	21	16
(China) Sun FX	21	18	21

==== Section 4 ====
First round
(China) Ye HK	16	13
(Chinese Taipei) Chen C-t	21	21
(South Korea) Lee Y-k	18	14
(China) Lu GZ	21	21
(China) Li X	15	13
(South Korea) Heo K-h	21	21

Second round
(Chinese Taipei) Chen C-t	24	21
(China) Ren CM	22	15
(China) Lu GZ	21	21
5	(Vietnam) Nguyễn T M	18	9
(South Korea) Heo K-h	21	21
(Chinese Taipei) Lee C-h	16	13
(China) Bai YP	15	14
2	(Malaysia) Liew D	21	21

Third round
(Chinese Taipei) Chen C-t	7	19
(China) Lu GZ	21	21
(South Korea) Heo K-h	21	17	19
2	(Malaysia) Liew D	13	21	21

Quarter-finals
(China) Lu GZ	21	21
2	(Malaysia) Liew D	18	5

== Women's singles ==
=== Seeds ===
1. (Chinese Taipei) Chen Su-yu (second round)
2. (Vietnam) Vũ Thị Trang (second round)
3. (Chinese Taipei) Sung Shuo-yun (quarter-finals)
4. (India) Sri Krishna Priya Kudaravalli (withdrew)
5. (Indonesia) Yulia Yosephine Susanto (withdrew)
6. (India) Sai Uttejitha Rao Chukka (withdrew)
7. (China) Cai Yanyan (quarter-finals)
8. (Thailand) Thamolwan Poopradubsil (first round)

=== Finals ===
Semi-finals
(China) Wang Zhiyi	19	17
(China) Li Xuerui	21	21
(South Korea) Sim Yu-jin	11	11
(South Korea) Kim Ga-eun	21	21

Final
(China) Li Xuerui	16	21	21
(South Korea) Kim Ga-eun	21	16	18

=== Top half ===
==== Section 1 ====
First round
1	(Chinese Taipei) Chen S-y	21	21
Q4	(China) Zheng SY	19	9
(China) Han Y	21	21
Q3	(China) Dai W	16	11
PFQ	(China) Zhou M	17	21
(South Korea) Jeon J-i	21	23
(China) Wang ZY	21	21
(Japan) N Shimoda	14	13

Second round
1	(Chinese Taipei) Chen S-y	11	14
(China) Han Y	21	21
(South Korea) Jeon J-i	15	19
(China) Wang ZY	21	21

Quarter-finals
(China) Han Y	21	13	13
(China) Wang ZY	13	21	21

==== Section 2 ====
First round
PFQ	(China) Yang RW	14	15
(Hong Kong) Deng X	21	21
(China) Zhang YM	21	21
(Chinese Taipei) Liang T-y	13	15
PFQ	(China) Chen NZ	18	16
(China) Li XR	21	21
(Chinese Taipei) Cheng C-y	14	23	25
(China) Fan MY	21	21	27

Second round
(Hong Kong) Deng X	21	17	21
(China) Zhang YM	17	21	15
(China) Li XR	21	21
(China) Fan MY	16	14

Quarter-finals
(Hong Kong) Deng X	17	21	14
(China) Li XR	21	11	21

=== Bottom half ===
==== Section 3 ====
First round
(South Korea) Sim Y-j	21	21
(Chinese Taipei) Chen H-h	19	12
(China) Wei YX	16	21	21
8	(Thailand) T Poopradubsil	21	13	10
(Chinese Taipei) Lin Y-c	19	19
(Japan) Y Nakai	21	21
Q1	(China) Han QX	22	9
3	(Chinese Taipei) Sung S-y	24	21

Second round
(South Korea) Sim Y-j	21	21
(China) Wei YX	18	12
(Japan) Y Nakai	16	12
3	(Chinese Taipei) Sung S-y	21	21

Quarter-finals
(South Korea) Sim Y-j	21	15	21
3	(Chinese Taipei) Sung S-y	17	21	19

==== Section 4 ====
First round
(China) Ji ST	21	21
(South Korea) Lee S-y	15	18
(Chinese Taipei) Yu C-h	17	12
7	(China) Cai YY	21	21
(China) Li Y	23	13
(South Korea) Kim G-e	25	21
Q2	Bye
2	(Vietnam) Vũ T T

Second round
(China) Ji ST	12	10
7	(China) Cai YY	21	21
(South Korea) Kim G-e	21	21	21
2	(Vietnam) Vũ T T	19	23	13

Quarter-finals
7	(China) Cai YY	19	21	16
(South Korea) Kim G-e	21	13	21

== Men's doubles ==
=== Seeds ===
1. (China) Han Chengkai / Zhou Haodong (champions)
2. (Chinese Taipei) Po Li-wei / Yang Ming-tse (semi-finals)
3. (South Korea) Choi Hyuk-gyun / Park Kyung-hoon (quarter-finals)
4. (China) Chai Biao / Wang Zekang (second round)

=== Finals ===
Semi-finals
1	(China) Han Chengkai (China) Zhou Haodong	17	25	21
(South Korea) Kang Min-hyuk (South Korea) Kim Won-ho	21	23	18
(China) Di Zijian (China) Wang Chang	21	18	23
2	(Chinese Taipei) Po Li-wei (Chinese Taipei) Yang Ming-tse	13	21	21

Final
1	(China) Han Chengkai (China) Zhou Haodong	19	21	21
(China) Di Zijian (China) Wang Chang	21	17	16

=== Top half ===
==== Section 1 ====
First round
(China) Ou XY (China) Ren XY	21	21
(Chinese Taipei) Lin S-k (Chinese Taipei) Tseng M-h	17	15
(Chinese Taipei) Lee F-c (Chinese Taipei) Lee F-j	21	21
(China) Feng YZ (China) Liu SW	19	19
(Thailand) P Thongnuam (Thailand) N Tulamok	21	21	16
(China) Dai ZY (China) Liang YW	23	17	21

Second round
1	(China) Han CK (China) Zhou HD	21	21
(China) Ou XY (China) Ren XY	14	14
(Chinese Taipei) Lee F-c (Chinese Taipei) Lee F-j	21	21
(China) Dai ZY (China) Liang YW	14	12

Quarter-finals
1	(China) Han CK (China) Zhou HD	21	21
(Chinese Taipei) Lee F-c (Chinese Taipei) Lee F-j	14	13

==== Section 2 ====
First round
(South Korea) Kang M-h (South Korea) Kim W-h	21	21
(Chinese Taipei) Chang K-c (Chinese Taipei) Lu C-p	16	15
(Chinese Taipei) Chen X-y (Chinese Taipei) Wu Y-c	21	13	21
(China) Liang WK (China) Shang YC	16	21	23
(Malaysia) A Chia (Malaysia) Soh W Y	17	18
(Chinese Taipei) Lee S-m (Chinese Taipei) Yang P-h	21	21

Second round
4	(China) Chai B (China) Wang ZK	14	21	12
(South Korea) Kang M-h (South Korea) Kim W-h	21	18	21
(China) Liang WK (China) Shang YC	19	21	6
(Chinese Taipei) Lee S-m (Chinese Taipei) Yang P-h	21	14	21

Quarter-finals
(South Korea) Kang M-h (South Korea) Kim W-h	21	21
(Chinese Taipei) Lee S-m (Chinese Taipei) Yang P-h	19	18

=== Bottom half ===
==== Section 3 ====
First round
(Chinese Taipei) Lee C-h (Chinese Taipei) Lin Y-h	17	11
(China) Dai EY (China) Guo XW	21	21
(Chinese Taipei) Lee C-h (Chinese Taipei) Lin C-y	9	21	14
(China) Di ZJ (China) Wang C	21	16	21
(Chinese Taipei) Chen C-t (Chinese Taipei) Yang C-c	18	21	21
(China) Guan ZC (China) Zeng WH	21	14	16

Second round
(China) Dai EY (China) Guo XW	21	26	15
(China) Di ZJ (China) Wang C	19	28	21
(Chinese Taipei) Chen C-t (Chinese Taipei) Yang C-c	13	12
3	(South Korea) Choi H-g (South Korea) Park K-h	21	21

Quarter-finals
(China) Di ZJ (China) Wang C	21	21
3	(South Korea) Choi H-g (South Korea) Park K-h	18	14

==== Section 4 ====
First round
(South Korea) Jung J-w (South Korea) Kim J-h	21	21
(China) Guo RH (China) Zheng BB	10	14
(China) Jiang ZB (China) Zhang BR	21	21
(Chinese Taipei) Chi Y-j (Chinese Taipei) Liu W-c	15	16
(China) Chen SH (China) Dong WJ	21	21
(Chinese Taipei) Lu C-h (Chinese Taipei) Shih K-c	9	16

Second round
(South Korea) Jung J-w (South Korea) Kim J-h	17	21	21
(China) Jiang ZB (China) Zhang BR	21	13	19
(China) Chen SH (China) Dong WJ	21	19	19
2	(Chinese Taipei) Po L-w (Chinese Taipei) Yang M-t	18	21	21

Quarter-finals
(South Korea) Jung J-w (South Korea) Kim J-h	17	21	20
2	(Chinese Taipei) Po L-w (Chinese Taipei) Yang M-t	21	18	22

== Women's doubles ==
=== Seeds ===
1. (Thailand) Chayanit Chaladchalam / Phataimas Muenwong (semi-finals)
2. (Chinese Taipei) Chiang Kai-hsin / Hung Shih-han (second round)
3. (China) Du Yue / Li Yinhui (champions)
4. (Chinese Taipei) Chang Ching-hui / Yang Ching-tun (second round)

=== Finals ===
Semi-finals
1	(Thailand) Chayanit Chaladchalam (Thailand) Phataimas Muenwong	9	12
(China) Huang Dongping (China) Li Wenmei	21	21
3	(China) Du Yue (China) Li Yinhui	21	21
(China) Tang Jinhua (China) Yu Xiaohan	18	16

Final
(China) Huang Dongping (China) Li Wenmei	16	17
3	(China) Du Yue (China) Li Yinhui	21	21

=== Top half ===
==== Section 1 ====
First round
(China) Dong WJ (China) Feng XY	21	21
(Indonesia) Y Barkah (Indonesia) R E Putri Sari	16	15
(Chinese Taipei) Cheng Y-c (Chinese Taipei) Hsieh P-s	19	21	21
(China) Guo LZ (China) Zhang SX	21	14	10

Second round
1	(Thailand) C Chaladchalam (Thailand) P Muenwong	21	21
(China) Dong WJ (China) Feng XY	15	15
(Japan) N Matsuyama (Japan) C Shida
(Chinese Taipei) Cheng Y-c (Chinese Taipei) Hsieh P-s	w	/	o

Quarter-finals
1	(Thailand) C Chaladchalam (Thailand) P Muenwong	21	18	21
(Chinese Taipei) Cheng Y-c (Chinese Taipei) Hsieh P-s	14	21	15

==== Section 2 ====
First round
(Thailand) K Dubthuk (Thailand) N Saengchote	21	18	21
(China) Feng ZX (China) Li JJ	19	21	16
(China) Huang DP (China) Li WM	21	21
(Chinese Taipei) Chang H-t (Chinese Taipei) Yu C-h	17	12

Second round
4	(Chinese Taipei) Chang C-h (Chinese Taipei) Yang C-t	20	21	19
(Thailand) K Dubthuk (Thailand) N Saengchote	22	18	21
(China) Luo XM (China) Zhou XR	17	15
(China) Huang DP (China) Li WM	21	21

Quarter-finals
(Thailand) K Dubthuk (Thailand) N Saengchote	12	5
(China) Huang DP (China) Li WM	21	21

=== Bottom half ===
==== Section 3 ====
First round
(Indonesia) A S Awanda (Indonesia) M C Sahputri	21	21
(China) Chen L (China) Xu Y	12	16
(China) Chen FH (China) Zhou SQ	21	21
(Chinese Taipei) Lin T-y (Chinese Taipei) Lin Y-c	15	19
(China) Chen YX (China) Li YJ	13	7
(Indonesia) N K M Istarani (Indonesia) N K Maheswari	21	21

Second round
(Indonesia) A S Awanda (Indonesia) M C Sahputri	21	21
(China) Chen FH (China) Zhou SQ	12	14
(Indonesia) N K M Istarani (Indonesia) N K Maheswari	19	19
3	(China) Du Y (China) Li YH	21	21

Quarter-finals
(Indonesia) A S Awanda (Indonesia) M C Sahputri	16	15
3	(China) Du Y (China) Li YH	21	21

==== Section 4 ====
First round
(Chinese Taipei) Chen H-h (Chinese Taipei) Hu L-f	14	14
(China) Tang JH (China) Yu XH	21	21
(China) Liu XX (China) Xia YT	21	21
(Chinese Taipei) Cheng C-y (Chinese Taipei) Sung S-y	13	16

Second round
(China) Tang JH (China) Yu XH	21	21
(China) Chen YY (China) Lin FL	14	16
(China) Liu XX (China) Xia YT	21	21
2	(Chinese Taipei) Chiang K-h (Chinese Taipei) Hung S-h	17	15

Quarter-finals
(China) Tang JH (China) Yu XH	21	20	21
(China) Liu XX (China) Xia YT	17	22	17

== Mixed doubles ==
=== Seeds ===
1. (Indonesia) Ronald Alexander / Annisa Saufika (final)
2. (Chinese Taipei) Po Li-wei / Chang Ching-hui (second round)
3. (Chinese Taipei) Wu Yuan-cheng / Yang Ching-tun (second round)
4. (Chinese Taipei) Chang Ko-chi / Cheng Chi-ya (quarter-finals)

=== Finals ===
Semi-finals
1	(Indonesia) Ronald Alexander (Indonesia) Annisa Saufika	14	21	21
(China) Ou Xuanyi (China) Chen Lu	21	19	19
(China) Guo Xinwa (China) Liu Xuanxuan	21	21
(China) Di Zijian (China) Li Yijing	15	16

Final
1	(Indonesia) Ronald Alexander (Indonesia) Annisa Saufika	17	21	19
(China) Guo Xinwa (China) Liu Xuanxuan	21	7	21

=== Top half ===
==== Section 1 ====
First round
(Thailand) P Thongnuam (Thailand) K Dubthuk	19	16
(China) Dong WJ (China) Xu Y	21	21
(Thailand) N Tulamok (Thailand) N Saengchote	16	21	21
(China) Shang YC (China) Zhou SQ	21	10	19
(China) Jiang ZB (China) Luo XM	13	18
(Chinese Taipei) Lee F-j (Chinese Taipei) Yu C-h	21	21

Second round
1	(Indonesia) R Alexander (Indonesia) A Saufika	21	21
(China) Dong WJ (China) Xu Y	10	12
(Thailand) N Tulamok (Thailand) N Saengchote	12	13
(Chinese Taipei) Lee F-j (Chinese Taipei) Yu C-h	21	21

Quarter-finals
1	(Indonesia) R Alexander (Indonesia) A Saufika	21	21
(Chinese Taipei) Lee F-j (Chinese Taipei) Yu C-h	14	14

==== Section 2 ====
First Round
4	(Chinese Taipei) Chang K-c (Chinese Taipei) Cheng C-y	21	24
(China) Liang WK (China) Chen YY	16	22
(Chinese Taipei) Chi Y-j (Chinese Taipei) Hsieh P-s	21	21
(China) Guo RH (China) Feng ZX	16	13
(China) Ou XY (China) Chen L	21	21
(Chinese Taipei) Tseng M-h (Chinese Taipei) Cheng Y-c	10	19
(China) Feng YZ (China) Lin FL	24	18	21
(Chinese Taipei) Lin S-k (Chinese Taipei) Hu L-f	22	21	17

Second Round
4	(Chinese Taipei) Chang K-c (Chinese Taipei) Cheng C-y	21	21
(Chinese Taipei) Chi Y-j (Chinese Taipei) Hsieh P-s	14	8
(China) Ou XY (China) Chen L	21	21
(China) Feng YZ (China) Lin FL	12	18

Quarter-finals
4	(Chinese Taipei) Chang K-c (Chinese Taipei) Cheng C-y	12	21	19
(China) Ou XY (China) Chen L	21	17	21

=== Bottom half ===
==== Section 3 ====
First Round
(Chinese Taipei) Yang M-t (Chinese Taipei) Sung S-y	24	21
(China) Zeng WH (China) Chen FH	22	16
(Indonesia) R Rivaldy (Indonesia) P H Mentari	21	21
(China) Zeng BB (China) Chen YX	8	13
(Chinese Taipei) Lu C-p (Chinese Taipei) Chang H-t	21	12	18
(China) Guo XW (China) Liu XX	15	21	21
(China) Guan ZC (China) Li JJ	16	21	16
3	(Chinese Taipei) Wu Y-c (Chinese Taipei) Yang C-t	21	18	21

Second Round
(Chinese Taipei) Yang M-t (Chinese Taipei) Sung S-y	15	16
(Indonesia) R Rivaldy (Indonesia) P H Mentari	21	21
(China) Guo XW (China) Liu XX	21	21
3	(Chinese Taipei) Wu Y-c (Chinese Taipei) Yang C-t	13	13

Quarter-finals
(Indonesia) R Rivaldy (Indonesia) P H Mentari	20	17
(China) Guo XW (China) Liu XX	22	21

==== Section 4 ====
First round
(Indonesia) R K Suwardi (Indonesia) D Susanto
(China) Di ZJ (China) Li YJ	w	/	o
(China) Dai EY (China) Zhou XR	21	10	21
(China) Wang ZK (China) Dong WJ	19	21	18
(South Korea) Kim H-t (South Korea) Kim H-j	22	21
(China) Liu SW (China) Zhang SX	20	17

Second round
(China) Di ZJ (China) Li YJ	21	21
(China) Dai EY (China) Zhou XR	17	13
(South Korea) Kim H-t (South Korea) Kim H-j	12	21	22
2	(Chinese Taipei) Po L-w (Chinese Taipei) Chang C-h	21	18	20

Quarter-finals
(China) Di ZJ (China) Li YJ	17	21	21
(South Korea) Kim H-t (South Korea) Kim H-j	21	17	11

Preceded by 2018 Orléans Masters	BWF World Tour; 2018 BWF season	Succeeded by 2018 New Zealand Open
