= 2018 BWF World Junior Championships – Boys' doubles =

2018 BWF World Junior Championships Boys' Doubles
Tournament details
- Dates: 12 – 18 November 2018
- Edition: 20th
- Level: International
- Venue: Markham Pan Am Centre
- Location: Markham, Canada

The boys' doubles of the tournament 2018 BWF World Junior Championships was held on 12–18 November. The defending champions from the last edition are Mahiro Kaneko / Yunosuke Kubota from Japan.

== Seeds ==
1. (China) Di Zijian / Wang Chang (champions)
2. (Indonesia) Ghifari Anandaffa Prihardika / Pramudya Kusumawardana (second round)
3. (China) Liang Weikeng / Shang Yichen (semifinals)
4. (Scotland) Christopher Grimley / Matthew Grimley (fourth round)
5. (India) Krishna Prasad Garaga / Dhruv Kapila (third round)
6. (France) Fabien Delrue / William Villeger (third round)
7. (Indonesia) Leo Rolly Carnando / Daniel Marthin (fourth round)
8. (Thailand) Ratchapol Makkasasithorn / Weeraphat Phakrajung (third round)

9. (Italy) Enrico Baroni / Giovanni Toti (third round)
10. (South Korea) Shin Tae-yang / Wang Chan (final)
11. (Thailand) Thanawin Madee / Wachirawit Sothon (semifinals)
12. (India) Vishnu Vardhan Goud Panjala / Srikrishna Sai Kumar Podile (quarterfinals)
13. (France) Kenji Lovang / Christo Popov (second round)
14. (England) Rory Easton / Zach Russ (third round)
15. (Spain) Joan Monroy / Carlos Piris (third round)
16. (France) Maxime Briot / Yanis Gaudin (third round)

Click on the seed number of a player to go to their draw section.

== Draw ==
=== Finals ===
Quarterfinals
1	(China) Di Zijian (China) Wang Chang	21	21
(China) Dai Enyi (China) Feng Yanzhe	18	11
11	(Thailand) Thanawin Madee (Thailand) Wachirawit Sothon	21	21
(Chinese Taipei) Cheng Kai-wen (Chinese Taipei) Lu Chih-wei	19	14
(Thailand) Apichasit Teerawirat (Thailand) Kunlavut Vitidsarn	13	6
3	(China) Liang Weikeng (China) Shang Yichen	21	21
10	(South Korea) Shin Tae-yang (South Korea) Wang Chan	21	21
12	(India) Vishnu Vardhan Goud Panjala (India) Srikrishna Sai Kumar Podile	11	8

Semifinals
1	(China) Di Zijian (China) Wang Chang	21	21
11	(Thailand) Thanawin Madee (Thailand) Wachirawit Sothon	15	10
3	(China) Liang Weikeng (China) Shang Yichen	12	15
10	(South Korea) Shin Tae-yang (South Korea) Wang Chan	21	21

Finals
1	(China) Di Zijian (China) Wang Chang	21	22
10	(South Korea) Shin Tae-yang (South Korea) Wang Chan	19	20

=== Top half ===
==== Section 1 ====
First round
(Kenya) Ur O Shah (Kenya) Uj O Shah	7	10
(Macau) Che P N (Macau) Lam H H	21	21

Second round
1	(China) Di ZJ (China) Wang C	21	21
(Australia) Teoh K C (Australia) P Yan	7	14
(South Korea) Ki D-j (South Korea) Kim S-h	21	21
(New Zealand) O Guo (New Zealand) D Vong	11	9
15	(Spain) J Monroy (Spain) C Piris	21	21
(Uganda) E Emuddu (Uganda) A M N Vaheed	6	10
(England) W Jones (England) E van Leeuwen	21	21
(Macau) Che P N (Macau) Lam H H	14	9

Third round
1	(China) Di ZJ (China) Wang C	19	21	21
(South Korea) Ki D-j (South Korea) Kim S-h	21	17	12
15	(Spain) J Monroy (Spain) C Piris	16	17
(England) W Jones (England) E van Leeuwen	21	21

Fourth round
1	(China) Di ZJ (China) Wang C	21	21
(England) W Jones (England) E van Leeuwen	10	10

==== Section 2 ====
First round
(Denmark) M Muurholm (Denmark) M Vestergaard	21	21
(Ukraine) D Bosniuk (Ukraine) I Medynskiy	12	19

Second round
5	(India) K P Garaga (India) D Kapila	21	21
(Canada) A Choi (Canada) V Lu	8	9
(United States) T Liuzhou (United States) D Tan	6	10
(China) Dai EY (China) Feng YZ	21	21
9	(Italy) E Baroni (Italy) G Toti	21	14	21
(Sri Lanka) S Gunatilleke (Sri Lanka) G D Moragoda	16	21	18
(Mongolia) S Enkhbat (Mongolia) T Gombodorj	10	12
(Denmark) M Muurholm (Denmark) M Vestergaard	21	21

Third round
5	(India) K P Garaga (India) D Kapila	19	18
(China) Dai EY (China) Feng YZ	21	21
9	(Italy) E Baroni (Italy) G Toti	11	30	11
(Denmark) M Muurholm (Denmark) M Vestergaard	21	29	21

Fourth round
(China) Dai EY (China) Feng YZ	21	21
(Denmark) M Muurholm (Denmark) M Vestergaard	9	14

==== Section 3 ====
First round
(Switzerland) Y Orteu (Switzerland) M Q Pham	21	21
(Czech Republic) J Kral (Czech Republic) V Kullisek	12	11

Second round
4	(Scotland) C Grimley (Scotland) M Grimley	22	21
(Germany) B Holtschke (Austria) K Meusburger	20	19
(Peru) S de la Oliva (Peru) N Matias	6	9
(Japan) H Midorikawa (Japan) H Nakayama	21	21
11	(Thailand) T Madee (Thailand) W Sothon	24	21
(Mexico) A Gaitan (Mexico) L A Montoya	22	11
(Netherlands) G Duijs (Netherlands) B Wassink	21	21
(Switzerland) Y Orteu (Switzerland) M Q Pham	14	13

Third round
4	(Scotland) C Grimley (Scotland) M Grimley	19	21	21
(Japan) H Midorikawa (Japan) H Nakayama	21	12	19
11	(Thailand) T Madee (Thailand) W Sothon	22	21
(Netherlands) G Duijs (Netherlands) B Wassink	20	14

Fourth round
4	(Scotland) C Grimley (Scotland) M Grimley	21	18	14
11	(Thailand) T Madee (Thailand) W Sothon	12	21	21

==== Section 4 ====
First round
(Poland) A Niczyporuk (Poland) M Szymanowski	16	12
(Slovakia) A Antoska (Slovakia) J Horak	21	21
(Chinese Taipei) Cheng K-w (Chinese Taipei) Lu C-w	21	21
(Portugal) F Pires (Portugal) L A Silva	7	7

Second round
7	(Indonesia) L R Carnando (Indonesia) D Marthin	21	21
(Malaysia) Chia W J (Malaysia) Choong H J	15	19
(India) M S Khwairakpam (India) D S Konthoujam	21	21
(Slovakia) A Antoska (Slovakia) J Horak	14	8
13	(France) K Lovang (France) C Popov	8	20
(Singapore) A Tan (Singapore) Toh H Z	21	22
(Hong Kong) Chow H L (Hong Kong) Lui C W	20	13
(Chinese Taipei) Cheng K-w (Chinese Taipei) Lu C-w	22	21

Third round
7	(Indonesia) L R Carnando (Indonesia) D Marthin	21	21
(India) M S Khwairakpam (India) D S Konthoujam	14	11
(Singapore) A Tan (Singapore) Toh H Z	15	23	20
(Chinese Taipei) Cheng K-w (Chinese Taipei) Lu C-w	21	21	22

Fourth round
7	(Indonesia) L R Carnando (Indonesia) D Marthin	18	22	18
(Chinese Taipei) Cheng K-w (Chinese Taipei) Lu C-w	21	20	21

=== Bottom half ===
==== Section 5 ====
First round
(Australia) R Tang (Australia) R Venpin	14	12
(Thailand) A Teerawiwat (Thailand) K Vitidsarn	21	21
(Peru) B Barrueto (Peru) D Subauste	9	13
(Japan) T Kawamoto (Japan) T Kawamura	21	21

Second round
(Thailand) A Teerawiwat (Thailand) K Vitidsarn	21	21
(Malaysia) Chua Y C (Malaysia) Lwi S H	14	13
(Sri Lanka) C Dias (Sri Lanka) C Illeperumachchi	11	6
14	(England) R Easton (England) Z Russ	21	21
(Japan) T Kawamoto (Japan) T Kawamura	21	21
(Norway) B Norden (Norway) J Osthassel	15	10
(Faroe Islands) A A Myrini (Faroe Islands) A M Jacobsen	11	13
8	(Thailand) R Makkasasithorn (Thailand) W Phakrajung	21	21

Third round
(Thailand) A Teerawiwat (Thailand) K Vitidsarn	21	21
14	(England) R Easton (England) Z Russ	19	12
(Japan) T Kawamoto (Japan) T Kawamura	21	18	21
8	(Thailand) R Makkasasithorn (Thailand) W Phakrajung	19	21	17

Fourth round
(Thailand) A Teerawiwat (Thailand) K Vitidsarn	21	17	22
(Japan) T Kawamoto (Japan) T Kawamura	17	21	20

==== Section 6 ====
First round
(Hong Kong) Ko S H (Hong Kong) Mak P N	6	21	19
(Denmark) R Espersen (Denmark) S Gronbjerg	21	15	21

Second round
(Denmark) R Espersen (Denmark) S Gronbjerg	21	21
(United States) W Tsai (United States) R Zheng	19	9
(Ukraine) G Beketov (Ukraine) M Makhnovskiy	17	11
16	(France) M Briot (France) Y Gaudin	21	21
(Scotland) J Apiliga (Scotland) A Pringle	19	26	17
(Germany) M Kicklitz (Germany) A Sonnenschein	21	24	21
(Guyana) A Haynes (Guyana) T Jeffrey	5	4
3	(China) Liang WK (China) Shang YC	21	21

Third round
(Denmark) R Espersen (Denmark) S Gronbjerg	20	21	21
16	(France) M Briot (France) Y Gaudin	22	17	18
(Germany) M Kicklitz (Germany) A Sonnenschein	12	13
3	(China) Liang WK (China) Shang YC	21	21

Fourth round
(Denmark) R Espersen (Denmark) S Gronbjerg	15	8
3	(China) Liang WK (China) Shang YC	21	21

==== Section 7 ====
First round
(Canada) S Feng (Canada) B Yang	21	21
(Brazil) I Batalha (Brazil) J Matias	16	14

Second round
(Canada) S Feng (Canada) B Yang	10	12
(Singapore) Lee W H (Singapore) D M Ng	21	21
(South Korea) Kim J-y (South Korea) Noh M-w	6	23	17
10	(South Korea) Shin T-y (South Korea) Wang C	21	21	21
(Japan) T Kato (Japan) Y Takei	21	21
(Macau) Lee R H (Macau) Leong I C	13	10
(Chinese Taipei) Su P-w (Chinese Taipei) Wang T-c	12	18
6	(France) F Delrue (France) W Villeger	21	21

Third round
(Singapore) Lee W H (Singapore) D M Ng	14	7
10	(South Korea) Shin T-y (South Korea) Wang C	21	21
(Japan) T Kato (Japan) Y Takei	21	14	21
6	(France) F Delrue (France) W Villeger	16	21	15

Fourth round
10	(South Korea) Shin T-y (South Korea) Wang C	21	21	21
(Japan) T Kato (Japan) Y Takei	23	18	19

==== Section 8 ====
First round
(Mexico) J Rodriguez (Mexico) G Saavedra	10	10
(Sweden) J Hansson (Sweden) M Z-Bexell	21	21

Second round
(Sweden) J Hansson (Sweden) M Z-Bexell	21	21
(Poland) K Budny (Poland) M Wrzalik	16	19
(Spain) M Cardona (Spain) M San Luis	13	13
12	(India) V V G Panjala (India) S S K Podile	21	21
(Netherlands) W van der Aar (Netherlands) T van der Lecq	21	21
(South Africa) J Elliott (South Africa) R Summers	8	4
(Indonesia) D R Restu (Indonesia) B B K Wardana	21	16	21
2	(Indonesia) G A Prihardika (Indonesia) P Kusumawardana	19	21	13

Third round
(Sweden) J Hansson (Sweden) M Z-Bexell	18	14
12	(India) V V G Panjala (India) S S K Podile	21	21
(Netherlands) W van der Aar (Netherlands) T van der Lecq	16	17
(Indonesia) D R Restu (Indonesia) B B K Wardana	21	21

Fourth round
12	(India) V V G Panjala (India) S S K Podile	21	21
(Indonesia) D R Restu (Indonesia) B B K Wardana	11	17
