= Wang Chan =

South Korean badminton player (born 2000)

Personal information
- Born: 7 September 2000 (age 26)

Sport
- Country: South Korea
- Sport: Badminton

Men's & mixed doubles
- Highest ranking: 43 (MD with Na Sung-seung, 10 March 2020); 68 (XD with Shin Seung-chan, 25 July 2023)
- BWF profile
Medal record
Men's badminton
Representing South Korea
World Junior Championships
Silver medal – second place	2018 Markham	Boys' doubles
Silver medal – second place	2018 Markham	Mixed team
Bronze medal – third place	2017 Yogyakarta	Mixed team
Asian Junior Championships
Gold medal – first place	2017 Jakarta	Mixed team
Silver medal – second place	2018 Jakarta	Mixed doubles
Bronze medal – third place	2017 Jakarta	Boys' doubles
Bronze medal – third place	2018 Jakarta	Boys' doubles

Wang Chan (Korean: 왕찬; born 7 September 2000) is a South Korean badminton player. As a junior player, Wang have won a silver in the boys' doubles and a bronze in the mixed doubles at the 2018 World Junior Championships. He also won bronze medals in the boys' doubles in the 2017 and 2018 Asian Junior Championships, and a silver in the mixed doubles in 2018. He also helps Korean junior team to clinched the mixed team title at the 2017 Asian Junior Championships.

== Career ==
Wang began his career as a badminton player since in the elementary school, and has been making achievements since his junior career. He educated at the Seoul Physical Education High School, and was selected to join the national team to compete in the 2017 Asian Junior Championships, and managed to win a gold medal in the mixed team event and a bronze in the boys' doubles. In 2018, he won the boys' doubles title at the German Junior International. He later played at the 2018 Asian Junior Championships, clinched a mixed doubles silver and a boys' doubles bronze at that tournament.

== Achievements ==
=== World Junior Championships ===
Boys' doubles
Year	Venue	Partner	Opponent	Score	Result
2018	Markham Pan Am Centre; Markham, Canada	(South Korea) Shin Tae-yang	(China) Di Zijian (China) Wang Chang	19–21, 20–22	Silver

Mixed doubles
Year	Venue	Partner	Opponent	Score	Result
2018	Markham Pan Am Centre; Markham, Canada	(South Korea) Jeong Na-eun	(Indonesia) Rehan Naufal Kusharjanto (Indonesia) Siti Fadia Silva Ramadhanti	18–21, 18–21	Bronze

=== Asian Junior Championships ===
Boys' doubles
Year	Venue	Partner	Opponent	Score	Result	Ref.
2017	Jaya Raya Sports Hall Training Center; Jakarta, Indonesia	(South Korea) Shin Tae-yang	(South Korea) Lee Sang-min (South Korea) Na Sung-seung	21–18, 10–21, 19–11	Bronze	
2018	Jaya Raya Sports Hall Training Center; Jakarta, Indonesia	(South Korea) Shin Tae-yang	(China) Liang Weikeng (China) Shang Yichen	18–21, 24–26	Bronze	

Mixed doubles
Year	Venue	Partner	Opponent	Score	Result	Ref.
2018	Jaya Raya Sports Hall Training Center; Jakarta, Indonesia	(South Korea) Jeong Na-eun	(China) Guo Xinwa (China) Liu Xuanxuan	21–15, 19–21, 15–21	Silver	

=== BWF World Tour (1 title, 3 runners-up) ===
The BWF World Tour, which was announced on 19 March 2017 and implemented in 2018, is a series of elite badminton tournaments sanctioned by the Badminton World Federation (BWF). The BWF World Tours are divided into levels of World Tour Finals, Super 1000, Super 750, Super 500, Super 300, and the BWF Tour Super 100.

Men's doubles
Year	Tournament	Level	Partner	Opponent	Score	Result
2019	Hyderabad Open	Super 100	(South Korea) Na Sung-seung	(Indonesia) Muhammad Shohibul Fikri (Indonesia) Bagas Maulana	18–21, 18–21	(silver) Runner-up
2019	Vietnam Open	Super 100	(South Korea) Na Sung-seung	(South Korea) Choi Sol-gyu (South Korea) Seo Seung-jae	21–18, 16–21, 14–21	(silver) Runner-up
2025	Korea Masters	Super 300	(South Korea) Lee Jong-min	(Indonesia) Raymond Indra (Indonesia) Nikolaus Joaquin	16–21, 21–16, 21–6	(gold) Winner
2026	Malaysia Super 100	Super 100	(South Korea) Na Sung-seung	(South Korea) Jin Yong (South Korea) Jo Song-hyun	17–21, 18–21	(silver) Runner-up

=== BWF International Challenge/Series (2 titles, 1 runner-up) ===
Men's doubles
Year	Tournament	Partner	Opponent	Score	Result
2025	Scottish Open	(South Korea) Lee Jong-min	(Denmark) Daniel Lundgaard (Denmark) Mads Vestergaard	21–23, 21–14, 14–21	(silver) Runner-up

Mixed doubles
Year	Tournament	Partner	Opponent	Score	Result
2023	Osaka International	(South Korea) Shin Seung-chan	(South Korea) Kim Young-hyuk (South Korea) Lee Yu-lim	21–14, 14–21, 21–15	(gold) Winner
2023	Northern Marianas Open	(South Korea) Shin Seung-chan	(Japan) Hashiru Shimono (Japan) Miku Shigeta	21–13, 21–15	(gold) Winner

BWF International Challenge tournament
BWF International Series tournament
