= Guo Xinwa =

Chinese badminton player (born 2000)

Guo Xinwa 郭新娃
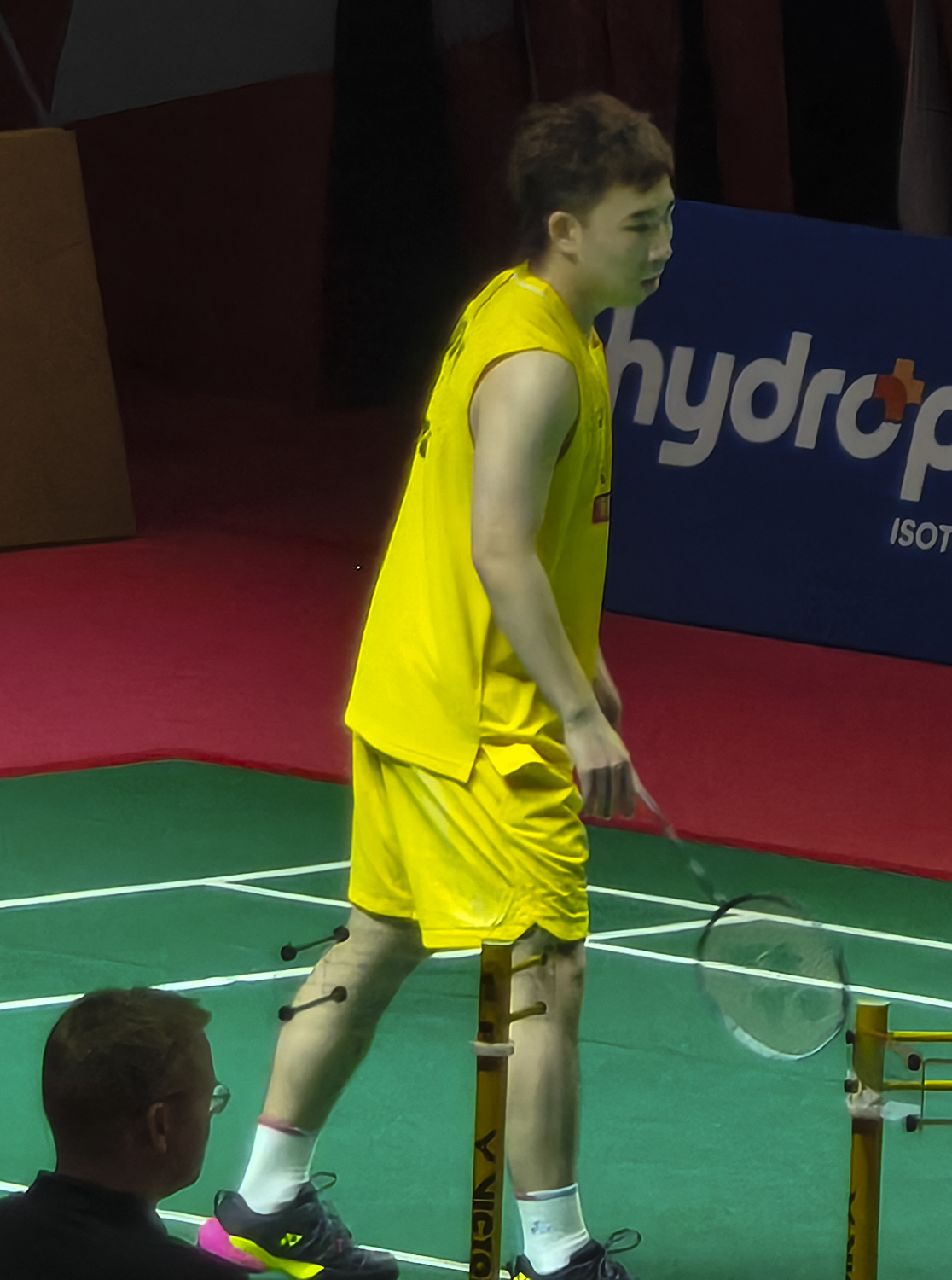

Personal information
- Born: 6 January 2000 (age 26) Jinzhou, Liaoning, China

Sport
- Country: China
- Sport: Badminton
- Handedness: Left

Mixed doubles
- Highest ranking: 5 (with Chen Fanghui, 18 March 2025)
- Current ranking: 5 (with Chen Fanghui, 17 November 2026)
- BWF profile
Medal record
Men's badminton
Representing China
World Championships
Bronze medal – third place	2025 Paris	Mixed doubles
Sudirman Cup
Gold medal – first place	2025 Xiamen	Mixed team
World Junior Championships
Gold medal – first place	2018 Markham	Mixed team
Asian Junior Championships
Gold medal – first place	2018 Jakarta	Mixed team
Gold medal – first place	2018 Jakarta	Mixed doubles

Guo Xinwa (Chinese: 郭新娃; pinyin: Guō Xīnwá; born 6 January 2000) is a Chinese badminton player. Guo won 2018 Asian Junior Championships in the mixed doubles with partner Liu Xuanxuan. In his early career, he joined the Jinzhou Sports School badminton team for training at the age of 8, and afterwards joined the Shandong team at the age of 13. When he turned 17, he represented the Shandong team in the National Games and won 2–1 against Beijing team where he registered an upset victory over Lin Dan.

== Achievements ==
=== World Championships ===
Mixed doubles
Year	Venue	Partner	Opponent	Score	Result
2025	Adidas Arena, Paris, France	(China) Chen Fanghui	(China) Jiang Zhenbang (China) Wei Yaxin	21–11, 21–23, 18–21	Bronze

=== Asian Junior Championships ===
Mixed doubles
Year	Venue	Partner	Opponent	Score	Result
2018	Jaya Raya Sports Hall Training Center; Jakarta, Indonesia	(China) Liu Xuanxuan	(South Korea) Wang Chan (South Korea) Jeong Na-eun	15–21, 21–19, 21–15	Gold

=== BWF World Tour (10 titles, 8 runners-up) ===
The BWF World Tour, which was announced on 19 March 2017 and implemented in 2018, is a series of elite badminton tournaments sanctioned by the Badminton World Federation (BWF). The BWF World Tour is divided into levels of World Tour Finals, Super 1000, Super 750, Super 500, Super 300 (part of the HSBC World Tour), and the BWF Tour Super 100.

Mixed doubles
Year	Tournament	Level	Partner	Opponent	Score	Result
2018	Lingshui China Masters	Super 100	(China) Liu Xuanxuan	(Indonesia) Ronald Alexander (Indonesia) Annisa Saufika	21–17, 7–21, 21–19	(gold) Winner
2019	Lingshui China Masters	Super 100	(China) Liu Xuanxuan	(Hong Kong) Tang Chun Man (Hong Kong) Ng Tsz Yau	21–16, 14–21, 13–21	(silver) Runner-up
2019	Canada Open	Super 100	(China) Zhang Shuxian	(South Korea) Ko Sung-hyun (South Korea) Eom Hye-won	19–21, 19–21	(silver) Runner-up
2019	Vietnam Open	Super 100	(China) Zhang Shuxian	(Chinese Taipei) Lee Jhe-huei (Chinese Taipei) Hsu Ya-ching	18–21, 22–20, 21–8	(gold) Winner
2019	Indonesia Masters	Super 100	(China) Zhang Shuxian	(Indonesia) Adnan Maulana (Indonesia) Mychelle Crhystine Bandaso	21–18, 16–21, 28–26	(gold) Winner
2019	SaarLorLux Open	Super 100	(China) Zhang Shuxian	(China) Ren Xiangyu (China) Zhou Chaomin	21–18, 21–19	(gold) Winner
2023	Hong Kong Open	Super 500	(China) Wei Yaxin	(Hong Kong) Tang Chun Man (Hong Kong) Tse Ying Suet	21–13, 21–19	(gold) Winner
2024	Ruichang China Masters	Super 100	(China) Li Qian	(China) Zhou Zhihong (China) Yang Jiayi	15–21, 15–21	(silver) Runner-up
2024	Thailand Open	Super 500	(China) Chen Fanghui	(Thailand) Dechapol Puavaranukroh (Thailand) Sapsiree Taerattanachai	12–21, 21–12, 21–18	(gold) Winner
2024	Australian Open	Super 500	(China) Chen Fanghui	(China) Jiang Zhenbang (China) Wei Yaxin	12–21, 21–16, 12– 21	(silver) Runner-up
2024	Korea Open	Super 500	(China) Li Qian	(Malaysia) Chen Tang Jie (Malaysia) Toh Ee Wei	21–17, 13–21, 13–21	(silver) Runner-up
2024	Macau Open	Super 300	(China) Chen Fanghui	(Indonesia) Dejan Ferdinansyah (Indonesia) Gloria Emanuelle Widjaja	21–15, 21–18	(gold) Winner
2024	Korea Masters	Super 300	(China) Chen Fanghui	(Indonesia) Dejan Ferdinansyah (Indonesia) Gloria Emanuelle Widjaja	21–10, 21–12	(gold) Winner
2025	Indonesia Masters	Super 500	(China) Chen Fanghui	(Japan) Hiroki Midorikawa (Japan) Natsu Saito	15–21, 17–21	(silver) Runner-up
2025	All England Open	Super 1000	(China) Chen Fanghui	(China) Feng Yanzhe (China) Wei Yaxin	21–16, 10–21, 23–21	(gold) Winner
2025	Hong Kong Open	Super 500	(China) Chen Fanghui	(China) Feng Yanzhe (China) Huang Dongping	14–21, 14–21	(silver) Runner-up
2026	Australian Open	Super 500	(China) Chen Fanghui	(China) Feng Yanzhe (China) Huang Dongping	17–21, 19–21	(silver) Runner-up
2026	China Open	Super 1000	(China) Chen Fanghui	(China) Feng Yanzhe (China) Huang Dongping	25–23, 20–22, 15–21	(gold) Winner

=== BWF International Challenge/Series (1 title, 3 runners-up) ===
Men's doubles
Year	Tournament	Partner	Opponent	Score	Result
2019	Austrian Open	(China) Liu Shiwen	(Denmark) Joel Eipe (Denmark) Rasmus Kjær	21–15, 20–22, 21–16	(gold) Winner

Mixed doubles
Year	Tournament	Partner	Opponent	Score	Result
2019	Osaka International	(China) Zhang Shuxian	(South Korea) Kim Won-ho (South Korea) Jeong Na-eun	17–21, 15–21	(silver) Runner-up
2019	Belarus International	(China) Zhang Shuxian	(China) Ren Xiangyu (China) Zhou Chaomin	20–22, 19–21	(silver) Runner-up
2023	China International	(China) Li Qian	(China) Cheng Xing (China) Chen Fanghui	19–21, 14–21	(silver) Runner-up

BWF International Challenge tournament
BWF International Series tournament

=== BWF Junior International (1 title, 2 runners-up) ===
Men's doubles
Year	Tournament	Partner	Opponent	Score	Result
2019	German Junior International	(China) Di Zijian	(South Korea) Ki Dong-ju (South Korea) Wang Chan	15–21, 16–21	(silver) Runner-up
2019	Jaya Raya Junior International	(China) Liu Shiwen	(China) Di Zijian (China) Wang Chang	13–21, 20–22	(silver) Runner-up

Mixed doubles
Year	Tournament	Partner	Opponent	Score	Result
2019	Dutch Junior International	(China) Liu Xuanxuan	(Japan) Hiroki Midorikawa (Japan) Natsu Saito	16–21, 21–18, 21–19	(gold) Winner

BWF Junior International Grand Prix tournament
BWF Junior International Challenge tournament
BWF Junior International Series tournament
BWF Junior Future Series tournament
