= Yuta Takei =

Japanese badminton player (born 2000)

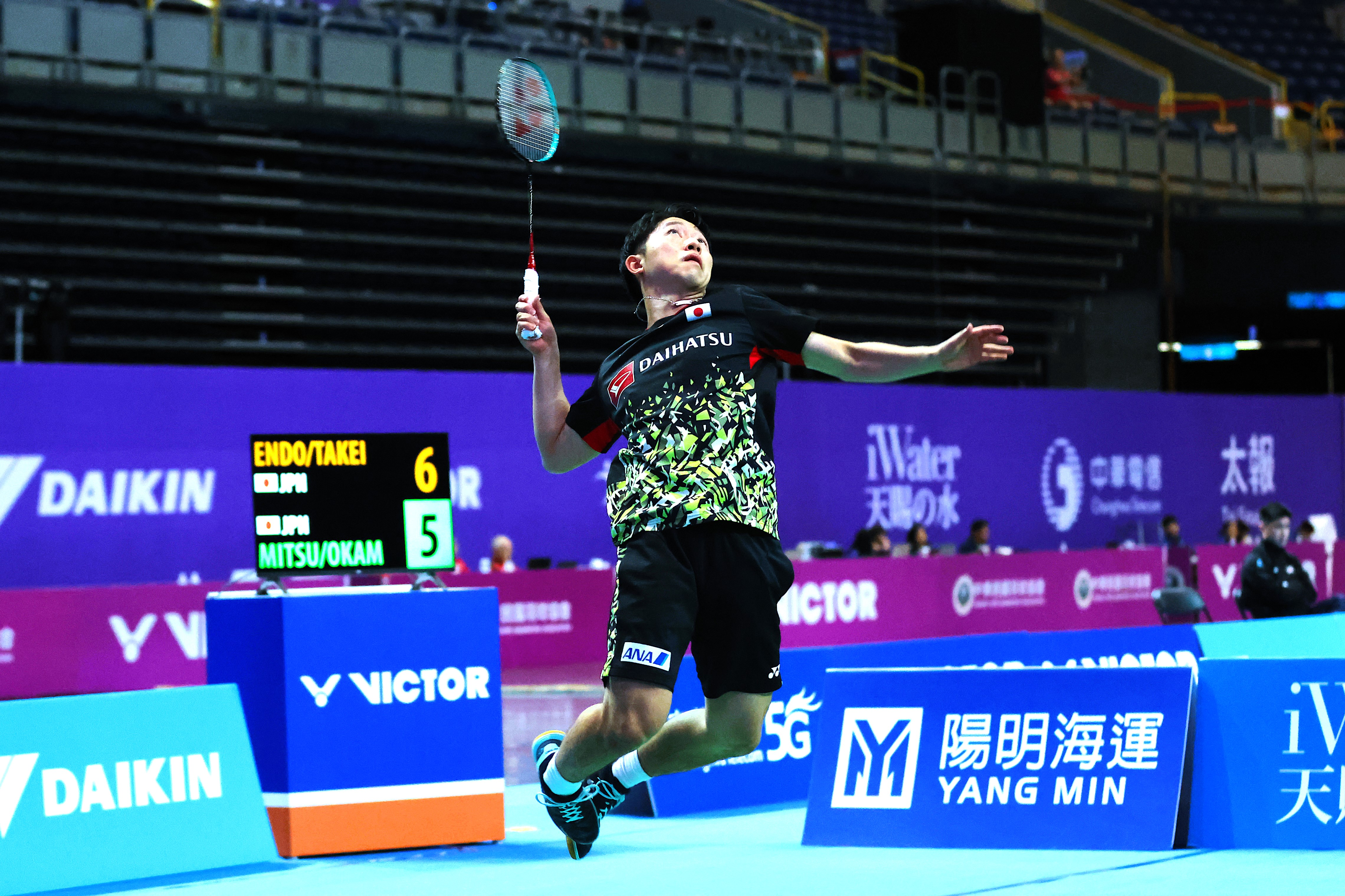
- Takei at the 2023 Kaohsiung Masters

Personal information
- Born: 29 November 2000 (age 25) Tokyo, Japan
- Height: 1.63 m (5 ft 4 in)

Sport
- Country: Japan
- Sport: Badminton
- Handedness: Right

Men's doubles
- Career record: 51 wins, 32 losses (61.45%)
- Highest ranking: 25 (with Ayato Endo, 16 May 2023)
- BWF profile
Medal record
Men's badminton
Representing Japan
World Junior Championships
Bronze medal – third place	2018 Markham	Mixed team
Asian Junior Championships
Silver medal – second place	2018 Jakarta	Mixed team

Yuta Takei (武井 優太, Takei Yūta; born 29 November 2000) is a Japanese badminton player from Tokyo. He graduated from the Meiji University, and joined NTT East badminton team on 1 April 2023.

== Achievements ==
=== BWF World Tour (1 title) ===
The BWF World Tour, which was announced on 19 March 2017 and implemented in 2018, is a series of elite badminton tournaments sanctioned by the Badminton World Federation (BWF). The BWF World Tour is divided into levels of World Tour Finals, Super 1000, Super 750, Super 500, Super 300 (part of the HSBC World Tour), and the BWF Tour Super 100.

Men's doubles

Year	Tournament	Level	Partner	Opponent	Score	Result	Ref
2022	Canada Open	Super 100	(Japan) Ayato Endo	(Japan) Takuto Inoue (Japan) Kenya Mitsuhashi	21–15, 21–8	(gold) Winner	

=== BWF International Challenge/Series (3 titles, 1 runner-up) ===
Men's doubles

Year	Tournament	Partner	Opponent	Score	Result	Ref
2022	Santo Domingo Open	(Japan) Ayato Endo	(Cuba) Osleni Guerrero (Cuba) Leodannis Martínez	21–13, 21–9	(gold) Winner	
2022	Mongolia International	(Japan) Ayato Endo	(Japan) Takuto Inoue (Japan) Kenya Mitsuhashi	21–14, 12–21, 21–19	(gold) Winner	
2022	Norwegian International	(Japan) Ayato Endo	(Chinese Taipei) Chen Zhi-ray (Chinese Taipei) Lu Chen	19–21, 19–21	(silver) Runner-up	
2022	Irish Open	(Japan) Ayato Endo	(Denmark) Rasmus Kjær (Denmark) Frederik Søgaard	21–18, 21–12	(gold) Winner	

BWF International Challenge tournament
BWF International Series tournament
