= Shang Yichen =

Chinese badminton player (born 2000)

Shang Yichen 商亦辰
Personal information
- Born: 9 April 2000 (age 26) Shanghai, China

Sport
- Country: China
- Sport: Badminton
- Handedness: Right

Men's and mixed doubles
- Highest ranking: 74 (MD with Liang Weikeng 7 January 2020); 482 (XD with Zhang Shuxian 19 March 2019)
- Current ranking: 521 (MD with Chen Sihang); 669 (XD with Qiao Shijun) (25 October 2022)
- BWF profile
Medal record
Men's badminton
Representing China
World Junior Championships
Gold medal – first place	2017 Yogyakarta	Mixed team
Gold medal – first place	2018 Markham	Mixed team
Bronze medal – third place	2018 Markham	Boys' doubles
Bronze medal – third place	2018 Markham	Mixed doubles
Asian Junior Championships
Gold medal – first place	2018 Jakarta	Mixed team
Silver medal – second place	2018 Jakarta	Boys' doubles

Shang Yichen (Chinese: 商亦辰; pinyin: Shāng Yìchén; born 9 April 2000) is a Chinese badminton player from Shanghai. He is part of the Chinese team that won gold in the 2018 BWF World Junior Championships.

== Career ==
Shang partnered with Liang Weikeng and won a bronze medal at the 2018 BWF World Junior Championships in the men's doubles event. He also won a bronze in mixed doubles with Zhang Shuxian. Shang won a silver medal with Liang at the 2018 Badminton Asia Junior Championships after losing to compatriots Di Zijian and Wang Chang in the final.

In 2019, Shang and Liang achieved runner-up position at the Malaysia International.

In 2022, he formed a partnership with Chen Sihang in men's doubles. They reached the quarterfinals of the Polish International in September.

== Achievements ==
=== World Junior Championships ===
Boys' doubles
Year	Venue	Partner	Opponent	Score	Result
2018	Markham Pan Am Centre; Markham, Canada	(China) Liang Weikeng	(South Korea) Shin Tae-yang (South Korea) Wang Chan	12–21, 15–21	Bronze

=== Asian Junior Championships ===
Boys' doubles
Year	Venue	Partner	Opponent	Score	Result
2018	Jaya Raya Sports Hall Training Center; Jakarta, Indonesia	(China) Liang Weikeng	(China) Wang Chang (China) Di Zijian	21–18, 22–24, 19–21	Silver

=== BWF International Challenge/Series (2 titles, 1 runner-up) ===
Men's doubles
Year	Tournament	Partner	Opponent	Score	Result
2019	Malaysia International	(China) Liang Weikeng	(Japan) Hiroki Midorikawa (Japan) Kyohei Yamashita	21–18, 10–21, 16–21	(silver) Runner-up

Mixed doubles
Year	Tournament	Partner	Opponent	Score	Result
2024	Malaysia International	(China) Lin Fangling	(China) Chen Sihang (China) Zhou Xinru	21–13, 21–16	(gold) Winner
2024 (II)	Vietnam International	(China) Lin Fangling	(Vietnam) Phạm Văn Hải (Vietnam) Thân Văn Anh	21–13, 21–17	(gold) Winner

BWF International Challenge tournament
BWF International Series tournament

=== BWF Junior International (2 titles) ===
Boys' doubles
Year	Tournament	Partner	Opponent	Score	Result
2018	Banthongyord Junior International	(China) Liang Weikeng	(Japan) Riku Hatano (Japan) Takuma Kawamoto	18–21, 21–16, 21–11	(gold) Winner
2018	Dutch Junior International	(China) Liang Weikeng	(India) Krishna Prasad Garaga (India) Dhruv Kapila	22–20, 21–16	(gold) Winner

BWF Junior International Grand Prix tournament
BWF Junior International Challenge tournament
BWF Junior International Series tournament
BWF Junior Future Series tournament
