= Di Zijian =

Chinese badminton player (born 2001)

Di Zijian 邸子健
Personal information
- Born: 27 February 2001 (age 25) Liaoyang, Liaoning, China

Sport
- Country: China
- Sport: Badminton
- Handedness: Right

Men's & mixed doubles
- Highest ranking: 33 (MD with Wang Chang 3 December 2019); 243 (XD with Li Yijing 17 March 2020)
- BWF profile
Medal record
Men's badminton
Representing China
Thomas Cup
Silver medal – second place	2020 Aarhus	Men's team
World Junior Championships
Gold medal – first place	2017 Yogyakarta	Mixed team
Gold medal – first place	2018 Markham	Boys' doubles
Gold medal – first place	2018 Markham	Mixed team
Silver medal – second place	2017 Yogyakarta	Boys' doubles
Silver medal – second place	2019 Kazan	Boys' doubles
Silver medal – second place	2019 Kazan	Mixed team
Asian Junior Championships
Gold medal – first place	2017 Jakarta	Boys' doubles
Gold medal – first place	2018 Jakarta	Boys' doubles
Gold medal – first place	2018 Jakarta	Mixed team
Silver medal – second place	2019 Suzhou	Boys' doubles
Bronze medal – third place	2019 Suzhou	Mixed team

Di Zijian (Chinese: 邸子健; pinyin: Dǐ Zǐjiàn; born 27 February 2001) is a Chinese badminton player. Born in Liaoyang, Liaoning, he started practicing badminton at the age of 10 and entered the Liaoning team when he was 14. Di was selected to join the national youth team in 2017, then became the national second team players at the beginning of 2018. He was two times boys' doubles gold medalists at the Asian Junior Championships in 2017 and 2018, also won the mixed team title with the national junior team in 2018. At the World Junior Championships, he helped the team clinch the gold medal in 2017 and 2018, and won the silver medals in the boys' doubles event in 2017 and 2019. He also showed his achievement in the senior tournament level by reaching the final at the 2018 Lingshui China Masters and finished as the runner-up in the men's doubles event. Di won his first BWF World Tour title in 2019 SaarLorLux Open.

== Controversy ==
In February 2022, Di was accused of match fixing in his match against Muhammad Shohibul Fikri and Bagas Maulana at the 2021 Denmark Open. According to chat screenshots posted on Weibo by Di's ex-girlfriend, Di purposely forfeited the first game of the match to get around RMB 100,000; they did end up losing against the Indonesian pair, 6-21, 19–21. The Weibo post also shared screenshots of Di sharing his dislike for a teammate from Zhejiang for being 'too lazy', which fans speculate to be his former partner Wang Chang, who comes from the province. As a result, he was expelled from the Chinese National Team.

== Achievements ==
=== World Junior Championships ===
Boys' doubles
Year	Venue	Partner	Opponent	Score	Result
2017	GOR Among Rogo; Yogyakarta, Indonesia	(China) Wang Chang	(Japan) Mahiro Kaneko (Japan) Yunosuke Kubota	14–21, 21–15, 13–21	Silver
2018	Markham Pan Am Centre; Markham, Canada	(China) Wang Chang	(South Korea) Shin Tae-yang (South Korea) Wang Chan	21–19, 22–20	Gold
2019	Kazan Gymnastics Center; Kazan, Russia	(China) Wang Chang	(Indonesia) Leo Rolly Carnando (Indonesia) Daniel Marthin	19–21, 18–21	Silver

=== Asian Junior Championships ===
Boys' doubles
Year	Venue	Partner	Opponent	Score	Result
2017	Jaya Raya Sports Hall Training Center; Jakarta, Indonesia	(China) Wang Chang	(South Korea) Lee Sang-min (South Korea) Na Sung-seung	21–19, 21–11	Gold
2018	Jaya Raya Sports Hall Training Center; Jakarta, Indonesia	(China) Wang Chang	(China) Liang Weikeng (China) Shang Yichen	18–21, 24–22, 21–19	Gold
2019	Suzhou Olympic Sports Centre; Suzhou, China	(China) Wang Chang	(Indonesia) Leo Rolly Carnando (Indonesia) Daniel Marthin	9–21, 21–15, 19–21	Silver

=== BWF World Tour (1 title, 1 runner-up) ===
The BWF World Tour, which was announced on 19 March 2017 and implemented in 2018, is a series of elite badminton tournaments sanctioned by the Badminton World Federation (BWF). The BWF World Tours are divided into levels of World Tour Finals, Super 1000, Super 750, Super 500, Super 300 (part of the HSBC World Tour), and the BWF Tour Super 100.

Men's doubles
Year	Tournament	Level	Partner	Opponent	Score	Result
2018	Lingshui China Masters	Super 100	(China) Wang Chang	(China) Han Chengkai (China) Zhou Haodong	21–19, 17–21, 16–21	(silver) Runner-up
2019	SaarLorLux Open	Super 100	(China) Wang Chang	(Denmark) Mathias Bay-Smidt (Denmark) Lasse Mølhede	21–17, 21–15	(gold) Winner
