= 2018 BWF World Junior Championships =

Tournament details
- Dates: 5–18 November
- Edition: 20th
- Level: International
- Venue: Markham Pan Am Centre
- Location: Markham, Ontario, Canada

The 2018 BWF World Junior Championships (officially known as the Li-Ning BWF World Junior Championships 2018 for sponsorship reasons) was the twentieth edition of the BWF World Junior Championships. It was held in Markham, Canada at Markham Pan Am Centre from 5 to 18 November 2018. This was the second time Canada had hosted the Badminton World Junior Championships.

== Host city selection ==
Canada was the only bidder for this event and the bid was approved by the Badminton World Federation in June 2017.

== Medalists ==
Event	Gold	Silver	Bronze
Teams	China; Bai Yupeng; Dai Enyi; Di Zijian; Feng Yanzhe; Guo Xinwa; Li Shifeng; Liang Weikeng; Shang Yichen; Wang Chang; Zhang Weiyi; Chen Yingxue; Chen Yingying; Li Yijing; Lin Fangling; Liu Xuanxuan; Wang Zhiyi; Wei Yaxin; Xia Yuting; Zhang Shuxian; Zhou Meng	South Korea; Choi Ji-hoon; Jeong U-min; Ki Dong-ju; Kim Joon-young; Kim Seung-hyun; Lee Hak-joo; Noh Min-woo; Park Hyeon-seung; Shin Tae-yang; Wang Chan; Chung Da-jeong; Jang Eun-seo; Jeong Na-eun; Kim A-young; Kim Ga-lam; Kim So-jung; Lee Jung-hyun; Lee So-yul; Park Ga-eun	Japan; Ryota Ichii; Taiki Kato; Takuma Kawamoto; Tsubasa Kawamura; Hiroki Midorikawa; Hiroki Nakayama; Kodai Naraoka; Yuta Takei; Shiena Fukumoto; Riko Gunji; Saki Kimura; Hirari Mizui; Yu Oishi; Natsu Saito; Miyu Takahashi; Rumi Yoshida
Teams	China; Bai Yupeng; Dai Enyi; Di Zijian; Feng Yanzhe; Guo Xinwa; Li Shifeng; Liang Weikeng; Shang Yichen; Wang Chang; Zhang Weiyi; Chen Yingxue; Chen Yingying; Li Yijing; Lin Fangling; Liu Xuanxuan; Wang Zhiyi; Wei Yaxin; Xia Yuting; Zhang Shuxian; Zhou Meng	South Korea; Choi Ji-hoon; Jeong U-min; Ki Dong-ju; Kim Joon-young; Kim Seung-hyun; Lee Hak-joo; Noh Min-woo; Park Hyeon-seung; Shin Tae-yang; Wang Chan; Chung Da-jeong; Jang Eun-seo; Jeong Na-eun; Kim A-young; Kim Ga-lam; Kim So-jung; Lee Jung-hyun; Lee So-yul; Park Ga-eun	Indonesia; Christian Adinata; Leo Rolly Carnando; Karono; Rehan Naufal Kusharjanto; Daniel Marthin; Ghifari Anandaffa Prihardika; Pramudya Kusumawardana; Ikhsan Rumbay; Bernardus Bagas Kusuma Wardana; Alberto Alvin Yulianto; Agatha Imanuela; Febriana Dwipuji Kusuma; Lisa Ayu Kusumawati; Nita Violina Marwah; Siti Fadia Silva Ramadhanti; Yasnita Enggira Setiawan; Ribka Sugiarto; Putri Syaikah; Putri Kusuma Wardani; Stephanie Widjaja
Boys' singles	(Thailand) Kunlavut Vitidsarn	(Japan) Kodai Naraoka	(India) Lakshya Sen
Boys' singles	(Thailand) Kunlavut Vitidsarn	(Japan) Kodai Naraoka	(China) Li Shifeng
Girls' singles	(Malaysia) Goh Jin Wei	(Denmark) Line Christophersen	(China) Wang Zhiyi
Girls' singles	(Malaysia) Goh Jin Wei	(Denmark) Line Christophersen	(China) Wei Yaxin
Boys' doubles	(China) Di Zijian (China) Wang Chang	(South Korea) Shin Tae-yang (South Korea) Wang Chan	(Thailand) Thanawin Madee (Thailand) Wachirawit Sothon
Boys' doubles	(China) Di Zijian (China) Wang Chang	(South Korea) Shin Tae-yang (South Korea) Wang Chan	(China) Liang Weikeng (China) Shang Yichen
Girls' doubles	(China) Liu Xuanxuan (China) Xia Yuting	(Malaysia) Pearly Tan Koong Le (Malaysia) Toh Ee Wei	(Indonesia) Agatha Imanuela (Indonesia) Siti Fadia Silva Ramadhanti
Girls' doubles	(China) Liu Xuanxuan (China) Xia Yuting	(Malaysia) Pearly Tan Koong Le (Malaysia) Toh Ee Wei	(Indonesia) Febriana Dwipuji Kusuma (Indonesia) Ribka Sugiarto
Mixed doubles	(Indonesia) Leo Rolly Carnando (Indonesia) Indah Cahya Sari Jamil	(Indonesia) Rehan Naufal Kusharjanto (Indonesia) Siti Fadia Silva Ramadhanti	(China) Shang Yichen (China) Zhang Shuxian
Mixed doubles	(Indonesia) Leo Rolly Carnando (Indonesia) Indah Cahya Sari Jamil	(Indonesia) Rehan Naufal Kusharjanto (Indonesia) Siti Fadia Silva Ramadhanti	(South Korea) Wang Chan (South Korea) Jeong Na-eun

== Medal table ==
Rank	Nation	Gold	Silver	Bronze	Total
1	China (CHN)	3	0	5	8
2	Indonesia (INA)	1	1	3	5
3	Malaysia (MAS)	1	1	0	2
4	Thailand (THA)	1	0	1	2
5	South Korea (KOR)	0	2	1	3
6	Japan (JPN)	0	1	1	2
7	Denmark (DEN)	0	1	0	1
8	India (IND)	0	0	1	1
Totals (8 entries)		6	6	12	24
