= Liang Weikeng =

Chinese badminton player

Liang Weikeng 梁伟铿
Personal information
- Born: 30 November 2000 (age 25) Baiyun District, Guangzhou, Guangdong, China
- Height: 1.77 m (5 ft 10 in)

Sport
- Country: China
- Sport: Badminton
- Handedness: Right

Men's doubles
- Highest ranking: 1 (with Wang Chang, 31 October 2023); 74 (with Shang Yichen, 7 January 2020)
- Current ranking: 3 (with Wang Chang, 10 November 2026)
- BWF profile
Medal record
Men's badminton
Representing China
Olympic Games
Silver medal – second place	2024 Paris	Men's doubles
World Championships
Gold medal – first place	2026 New Delhi	Men's doubles
Bronze medal – third place	2023 Copenhagen	Men's doubles
Sudirman Cup
Gold medal – first place	2023 Suzhou	Mixed team
Gold medal – first place	2025 Xiamen	Mixed team
Thomas Cup
Gold medal – first place	2024 Chengdu	Men's team
Gold medal – first place	2026 Horsens	Men's team
Asian Games
Gold medal – first place	2022 Hangzhou	Men's team
Silver medal – second place	2026 Aichi–Nagoya	Men's team
Silver medal – second place	2026 Aichi–Nagoya	Men's doubles
Asian Championships
Gold medal – first place	2024 Ningbo	Men's doubles
Bronze medal – third place	2025 Ningbo	Men's doubles
World Junior Championships
Gold medal – first place	2018 Markham	Mixed team
Bronze medal – third place	2018 Markham	Boys' doubles
Asian Junior Championships
Gold medal – first place	2018 Jakarta	Mixed team
Silver medal – second place	2018 Jakarta	Boys' doubles

Liang Weikeng (Chinese: 梁伟铿; pinyin: Liáng Wěikēng; Jyutping: loeng4 wai5 hang1; born 30 November 2000) is a Chinese badminton player. He was part of Chinese winning team at the 2023 Sudirman Cup, and at the same year won the men's doubles bronze medal at the BWF World Championships partnered with Wang Chang. Liang and Wang won their first title as a pair in the 2022 Japan Open.

In the junior events, Liang was a member of the Chinese junior squad that won gold medals in the 2018 World Junior Championships in Markham and the Asia Junior Championships in Jakarta.

== Career ==
Liang partnered with Shang Yichen and won a bronze medal at the 2018 BWF World Junior Championships in the men's doubles event. He also won a silver medal with Shang at the 2018 Badminton Asia Junior Championships after losing to compatriots Di Zijian and Wang Chang in the final.

After a long hiatus, Liang returned to the international court at the 2022 Thailand Open with a new partner, Wang Chang. They were able to break in the men's doubles competition by beating a few top pairs, including Tokyo 2020 bronze medalists Aaron Chia and Soh Wooi Yik and also world number 1 Marcus Fernaldi Gideon and Kevin Sanjaya Sukamuljo to advance to the final of the Indonesia Masters. In the final, they lost 10–21, 17–21 to home favorites Fajar Alfian and Muhammad Rian Ardianto. In the next tournament, they defeated the reigning World Champions Takuro Hoki and Yugo Kobayashi to reach the semi-finals of the Malaysia Masters, but were then stopped by Mohammad Ahsan and Hendra Setiawan in straight games. Liang then won his first international title in the Japan Open, where he and Wang defeating Kim Astrup and Anders Skaarup Rasmussen in the final in three games.

In the first half of the 2023 season, Liang and his partner Wang Chang showed quite significant progress. They were able to win 2 BWF World Tour titles in India and Thailand, as well as being runners-up in Malaysia and Singapore. Apart from that, Liang was part of the Chinese team that won the Sudirman Cup. Liang and Wang's achievements were able to bring them to 2nd place in the BWF world rankings on 13 June 2023.

In August, Liang and Wang won the bronze medal at the World Championships in Copenhagen. They were defeated by home pair Kim Astrup and Anders Skaarup Rasmussen in a close rubber game. The Chinese rising pair then claimed their first ever BWF World Tour Super 1000 title at the China Open.

== Achievements ==
=== Olympic Games ===
Men's doubles
Year	Venue	Partner	Opponent	Score	Result	Ref.
2024	Porte de La Chapelle Arena, Paris, France	(China) Wang Chang	(Chinese Taipei) Lee Yang (Chinese Taipei) Wang Chi-lin	17–21, 21–18, 19–21	Silver	

=== World Championships ===
Men's doubles
Year	Venue	Partner	Opponent	Score	Result	Ref.
2023	Royal Arena, Copenhagen, Denmark	(China) Wang Chang	(Denmark) Kim Astrup (Denmark) Anders Skaarup Rasmussen	21–17, 18–21, 19–21	Bronze	
2026	Indira Gandhi Arena, New Delhi, India	(China) Wang Chang	(Malaysia) Aaron Chia (Malaysia) Soh Wooi Yik	21–17, 21–16	Gold	

=== Asian Games ===
Men's doubles
Year	Venue	Partner	Opponent	Score	Result	Ref.
2026	Ichinomiya City Municipal Gymnasium, Ichinomiya, Japan	(China) Wang Chang	(Indonesia) Leo Rolly Carnando (Indonesia) Daniel Marthin	21–19, 13–21, 18–21	Silver	

=== Asian Championships ===
Men's doubles
Year	Venue	Partner	Opponent	Score	Result	Ref.
2024	Ningbo Olympic Sports Center Gymnasium, Ningbo, China	(China) Wang Chang	(Malaysia) Goh Sze Fei (Malaysia) Nur Izzuddin	21–17, 15–21, 21–10	Gold	
2025	Ningbo Olympic Sports Center Gymnasium, Ningbo, China	(China) Wang Chang	(Malaysia) Aaron Chia (Malaysia) Soh Wooi Yik	12–21, 14–21	Bronze	

=== World Junior Championships ===
Boys' doubles
Year	Venue	Partner	Opponent	Score	Result	Ref.
2018	Markham Pan Am Centre, Markham, Canada	(China) Shang Yichen	(South Korea) Shin Tae-yang (South Korea) Wang Chan	12–21, 15–21	Bronze	

=== Asian Junior Championships ===
Boys' doubles
Year	Venue	Partner	Opponent	Score	Result	Ref.
2018	Jaya Raya Sports Hall Training Center, Jakarta, Indonesia	(China) Shang Yichen	(China) Wang Chang (China) Di Zijian	21–18, 22–24, 19–21	Silver	

=== BWF World Tour (10 titles, 6 runners-up) ===
The BWF World Tour, which was announced on 19 March 2017 and implemented in 2018, is a series of elite badminton tournaments sanctioned by the Badminton World Federation (BWF). The BWF World Tours are divided into levels of World Tour Finals, Super 1000, Super 750, Super 500, Super 300, and the BWF Tour Super 100.

Men's doubles
Year	Tournament	Level	Partner	Opponent	Score	Result	Ref.
2022	Indonesia Masters	Super 500	(China) Wang Chang	(Indonesia) Fajar Alfian (Indonesia) Muhammad Rian Ardianto	10–21, 17–21	(silver) Runner-up	
2022	Japan Open	Super 750	(China) Wang Chang	(Denmark) Kim Astrup (Denmark) Anders Skaarup Rasmussen	21–18, 13–21, 21–17	(gold) Winner	
2023	Malaysia Open	Super 1000	(China) Wang Chang	(Indonesia) Fajar Alfian (Indonesia) Muhammad Rian Ardianto	18–21, 21–18, 13–21	(silver) Runner-up	
2023	India Open	Super 750	(China) Wang Chang	(Malaysia) Aaron Chia (Malaysia) Soh Wooi Yik	14–21, 21–19, 21–18	(gold) Winner	
2023	Thailand Open	Super 500	(China) Wang Chang	(Indonesia) Muhammad Shohibul Fikri (Indonesia) Bagas Maulana	21–10, 21–15	(gold) Winner	
2023	Singapore Open	Super 750	(China) Wang Chang	(Japan) Takuro Hoki (Japan) Yugo Kobayashi	13–21, 18–21	(silver) Runner-up	
2023	China Open	Super 1000	(China) Wang Chang	(Malaysia) Aaron Chia (Malaysia) Soh Wooi Yik	21–12, 21–14	(gold) Winner	
2023	China Masters	Super 750	(China) Wang Chang	(India) Satwiksairaj Rankireddy (India) Chirag Shetty	21–19, 18–21, 21–19	(gold) Winner	
2023	BWF World Tour Finals	World Tour Finals	(China) Wang Chang	(South Korea) Kang Min-hyuk (South Korea) Seo Seung-jae	17–21, 20–22	(silver) Runner-up	
2024	Malaysia Open	Super 1000	(China) Wang Chang	(India) Satwiksairaj Rankireddy (India) Chirag Shetty	9–21, 21–18, 21–17	(gold) Winner	
2024	Indonesia Open	Super 1000	(China) Wang Chang	(Malaysia) Man Wei Chong (Malaysia) Tee Kai Wun	19–21, 21–16, 21–12	(gold) Winner	
2024	Denmark Open	Super 750	(China) Wang Chang	(Denmark) Kim Astrup (Denmark) Anders Skaarup Rasmussen	21–18, 21–17	(gold) Winner	
2025	Orléans Masters	Super 300	(China) Wang Chang	(South Korea) Kang Min-hyuk (South Korea) Ki Dong-ju	13–21, 21–18, 18–21	(silver) Runner-up	
2025	Hong Kong Open	Super 500	(China) Wang Chang	(India) Satwiksairaj Rankireddy (India) Chirag Shetty	19–21, 21–14, 21–17	(gold) Winner	
2025	BWF World Tour Finals	World Tour Finals	(China) Wang Chang	(South Korea) Kim Won-ho (South Korea) Seo Seung-jae	18–21, 14–21	(silver) Runner-up	
2026	India Open	Super 750	(China) Wang Chang	(Japan) Hiroki Midorikawa (Japan) Kyohei Yamashita	17–21, 25–23, 21–16	(gold) Winner	

=== BWF International Challenge/Series (1 runner-up) ===
Men's doubles
Year	Tournament	Partner	Opponent	Score	Result	Ref.
2019	Malaysia International	(China) Shang Yichen	(Japan) Hiroki Midorikawa (Japan) Kyohei Yamashita	21–18, 10–21, 16–21	(silver) Runner-up	

=== BWF Junior International (2 titles) ===
Boys' doubles
Year	Tournament	Partner	Opponent	Score	Result	Ref.
2018	Banthongyord Junior International	(China) Shang Yichen	(Japan) Riku Hatano (Japan) Takuma Kawamoto	18–21, 21–16, 21–11	(gold) Winner	
2018	Dutch Junior International	(China) Shang Yichen	(India) Krishna Prasad Garaga (India) Dhruv Kapila	22–20, 21–16	(gold) Winner	

BWF Junior International Grand Prix tournament
BWF Junior International Challenge tournament
BWF Junior International Series tournament
BWF Junior Future Series tournament
