= 2018 BWF World Junior Championships – Teams event =

2018 BWF World Junior Championships Teams event
Tournament details
- Dates: 5 – 10 November 2018
- Edition: 20th
- Level: International
- Nations: 39
- Venue: Markham Pan Am Centre
- Location: Markham, Canada

The teams event of the 2018 BWF World Junior Championships was held on 5–10 November 2018. The event was also known as the 2018 Suhandinata Cup. China was the champion of the last edition held in Yogyakarta, Indonesia, and also 12-time defending champion in this event.

41 countries representing all five continental federations competed in this event. The group draw was done at the BWF Head Office, Kuala Lumpur, on 26 September. China were drawn with Australia and Germany in group A1. Canada as the host were drawn with Malaysia, Ukraine, Poland and Sweden in group B. Algeria and Dominican Republic withdrew before the start of the championships.

== Group stage ==
=== Group A ===
==== Group A1 ====
Pos	Team	Pld	W	L	MW	ML	GW	GL	PW	PL	Pts	Qualification
1	China [1]	2	2	0	10	0	20	0	420	190	2	Play-off A1
2	Germany	2	1	1	5	5	10	11	320	370	1	Play-off A2
3	Australia	2	0	2	0	10	1	20	258	438	0	Play-off A3

==== Group A2 ====
Pos	Team	Pld	W	L	MW	ML	GW	GL	PW	PL	Pts	Qualification
1	Hong Kong	2	2	0	10	0	20	0	447	313	2	Play-off A1
2	Netherlands [9/16]	2	1	1	3	7	8	15	385	439	1	Play-off A2
3	New Zealand	2	0	2	2	8	6	17	356	436	0	Play-off A3

==== Group A play-offs ====
Play-off A1
1	China	3
17/41	Hong Kong	0

Play-off A2
17/41	Germany	3
9/16	Netherlands	1

Play-off A3
17/41	Australia	1
17/41	New Zealand	3

=== Group B ===
Pos	Team	Pld	W	L	MW	ML	GW	GL	PW	PL	Pts	Qualification
1	Malaysia [5/8]	4	4	0	19	1	39	6	935	558	4	Final Stage 1st to 8th
2	Sweden	4	3	1	12	8	28	17	833	733	3	Final Stage 9th to 16th
3	Canada	4	2	2	13	7	28	19	874	803	2	Final Stage 17th to 24th
4	Ukraine [9/16]	4	1	3	5	15	14	33	725	923	1	Final Stage 25th to 32nd
5	Poland	4	0	4	1	19	5	39	553	903	0	Final Stage 33rd to 39th

=== Group C ===
Pos	Team	Pld	W	L	MW	ML	GW	GL	PW	PL	Pts	Qualification
1	Japan [9/16]	4	4	0	18	2	38	6	876	465	4	Final Stage 1st to 8th
2	Thailand [3/4]	4	3	1	17	3	36	8	877	469	3	Final Stage 9th to 16th
3	Peru	4	2	2	10	10	20	20	592	645	2	Final Stage 17th to 24th
4	South Africa	4	1	3	4	16	9	33	529	767	1	Final Stage 25th to 32nd
5	Mongolia	4	0	4	1	19	3	39	340	868	0	Final Stage 33rd to 39th

=== Group D ===
Pos	Team	Pld	W	L	MW	ML	GW	GL	PW	PL	Pts	Qualification
1	Chinese Taipei [5/8]	4	4	0	18	2	36	7	883	528	4	Final Stage 1st to 8th
2	France [9/16]	4	3	1	15	5	32	11	853	604	3	Final Stage 9th to 16th
3	Brazil	4	2	2	11	9	24	20	660	341	2	Final Stage 17th to 24th
4	Norway	4	1	3	6	14	14	28	611	757	1	Final Stage 25th to 32nd
5	Uganda	4	0	4	0	20	0	40	336	840	0	Final Stage 33rd to 39th

=== Group E ===
Pos	Team	Pld	W	L	MW	ML	GW	GL	PW	PL	Pts	Qualification
1	India [5/8]	3	3	0	15	0	30	1	644	241	3	Final Stage 1st to 8th
2	Sri Lanka	3	2	1	10	5	21	11	555	439	2	Final Stage 9th to 16th
3	Faroe Islands	3	1	2	5	10	10	21	418	549	1	Final Stage 17th to 24th
4	Kenya	3	0	3	0	15	2	30	277	665	0	Final Stage 25th to 32nd
	Algeria [9/16]	0	0	0	0	0	0	0	0	0	0	Withdrew

=== Group F ===
Pos	Team	Pld	W	L	MW	ML	GW	GL	PW	PL	Pts	Qualification
1	South Korea [3/4]	4	4	0	20	0	40	0	843	407	4	Final Stage 1st to 8th
2	Scotland [9/16]	4	3	1	13	7	28	18	835	771	3	Final Stage 9th to 16th
3	Czech Republic	4	2	2	7	13	16	30	767	863	2	Final Stage 17th to 24th
4	Spain	4	1	3	6	14	17	32	783	946	1	Final Stage 25th to 32nd
5	Slovakia	4	0	4	4	16	13	34	681	922	0	Final Stage 33rd to 39th

=== Group G ===
Pos	Team	Pld	W	L	MW	ML	GW	GL	PW	PL	Pts	Qualification
1	Denmark [5/8]	3	3	0	13	2	27	4	646	374	3	Final Stage 1st to 8th
2	Singapore [9/16]	3	2	1	11	4	22	8	580	421	2	Final Stage 9th to 16th
3	United States	3	1	2	6	9	12	19	534	480	1	Final Stage 17th to 24th
4	Guyana	3	0	3	0	15	0	30	145	630	0	Final Stage 25th to 32nd
	Dominican Republic	0	0	0	0	0	0	0	0	0	0	Withdrew

=== Group H ===
Pos	Team	Pld	W	L	MW	ML	GW	GL	PW	PL	Pts	Qualification
1	Indonesia [2]	4	4	0	20	0	40	0	841	415	4	Final Stage 1st to 8th
2	England [9/16]	4	3	1	13	7	28	16	822	655	3	Final Stage 9th to 16th
3	Mexico	4	2	2	7	13	15	28	657	811	2	Final Stage 17th to 24th
4	Austria	4	1	3	9	11	19	24	696	791	1	Final Stage 25th to 32nd
5	Macau	4	0	4	1	19	4	38	513	856	0	Final Stage 33rd to 39th

== Final stage ==
=== 1st to 8th ===
5th–6th place match
B	Malaysia	3
E	India	1
7th–8th place match
D	Chinese Taipei	3
G	Denmark	1

5th to 8th semifinals
B	Malaysia	3
D	Chinese Taipei	1
E	India	3
G	Denmark	2

1st to 8th quarterfinals
A	China	3
B	Malaysia	1
C	Japan	3
D	Chinese Taipei	0
E	India	1
F	South Korea	3
G	Denmark	0
H	Indonesia	3

1st to 4th semifinals
A	China	3
C	Japan	2
F	South Korea	3
H	Indonesia	1

Final
A	China	3
F	South Korea	1
Third place
C	Japan	np
H	Indonesia

==== 1st to 8th quarterfinals ====
China
3
Markham Pan Am Centre, Court 1
7 November 2018
19:00 UTC−3

Malaysia
1

			1	2	3
1	(China) (Malaysia)	Guo Xinwa / Liu Xuanxuan; Chia Wei Jie / Toh Ee Wei	16; 21	17; 21
2	(China) (Malaysia)	Li Shifeng; Ng Tze Yong	21; 7	21; 19
3	(China) (Malaysia)	Di Zijian / Wang chang Chia Wei Jie / Chua Yue Chern	21; 14	24; 22
4	(China) (Malaysia)	Wang Zhiyi; Goh Jin Wei	21; 19	21; 14
5	(China) (Malaysia)	Liu Xuanxuan / Xia Yuting; Pearly Tan Koong Le / Toh Ee Wei				not played

Japan
3
Markham Pan Am Centre, Court 2
7 November 2018
19:00 UTC−3

Chinese Taipei
0

			1	2	3
1	(Japan) (Chinese Taipei)	Hiroki Midorikawa / Natsu Saito; Chen Shiau-cheng / Li Zi-qing	21; 18	21; 13
2	(Japan) (Chinese Taipei)	Kodai Naraoka; Yu Sheng-po	21; 17	21; 15
3	(Japan) (Chinese Taipei)	Hiroki Midorikawa / Hiroki Nakayama; Lin Yu-chieh / Su Po-wei	21; 18	21; 17
4	(Japan) (Chinese Taipei)	Hirari Mizui; Lin Sih-yun				not played
5	(Japan) (Chinese Taipei)	Natsu Saito / Shiena Fukumoto; Li Zi-qing / Teng Chun-hsun				not played

India
1
Markham Pan Am Centre, Court 3
8 November 2018
08:30 UTC−3

South Korea
3

			1	2	3
1	(India) (South Korea)	Dhruv Kapila / Tanisha Crasto; Wang Chan / Jeong Na-eun	22; 20	14; 21	12; 21
2	(India) (South Korea)	Lakshya Sen; Choi Ji-hoon	16; 21	21; 18	21; 13
3	(India) (South Korea)	Krishna Prasad Garaga / Dhruv Kapila; Shin Tae-yang / Wang Chan	21; 19	19; 21	11; 21
4	(India) (South Korea)	Malvika Bansod; Park Ga-eun	17; 21	12; 21
5	(India) (South Korea)	Tanisha Crasto / Gayathri Gopichand; Jang Eun-seo / Lee Jung-hyun				not played

Denmark
0
Markham Pan Am Centre, Court 4
8 November 2018
08:30 UTC−3

Indonesia
3

			1	2	3
1	(Denmark) (Indonesia)	Daniel Lundgaard / Amalie Magelund; Rehan Naufal Kusharjanto / Siti Fadia Silva Ramadhanti	12; 21	22; 20	17; 21
2	(Denmark) (Indonesia)	Magnus Johannesen; Ikhsan Rumbay	13; 21	11; 21
3	(Denmark) (Indonesia)	Rasmus Espersen / Sebastian Gronbjerg; Leo Rolly Carnando / Daniel Marthin	14; 21	14; 21
4	(Denmark) (Indonesia)	Line Christophersen; Putri Kusuma Wardani				not played
5	(Denmark) (Indonesia)	Amalie Magelund / Freja Ravn; Febriana Dwipuji Kusuma / Ribka Sugiarto				not played

==== 5th to 8th semifinals ====
Malaysia
3
Markham Pan Am Centre, Court 2
8 November 2018
15:30 UTC−3

Chinese Taipei
1

			1	2	3
1	(Malaysia) (Chinese Taipei)	Chia Wei Jie / Toh Ee Wei; Yu Sheng-po / Teng Chun-hsun	21; 13	21; 13
2	(Malaysia) (Chinese Taipei)	Aidil Sholeh Ali Sadikin; Chen Shiau-cheng	17; 21	21; 19	24; 22
3	(Malaysia) (Chinese Taipei)	Chua Yue Chern / Sheng Hao Lwi; Chang Kai-wen / Lu Chih-wei	21; 23	11; 21
4	(Malaysia) (Chinese Taipei)	Eoon Qi Xuan; Lin Sih-yun	21; 11	21; 7
5	(Malaysia) (Chinese Taipei)	Pearly Tan Koong Le / Toh Ee Wei; Li Zi-qing / Teng Chun-hsun				not played

India
3
Markham Pan Am Centre, Court 1
8 November 2018
15:30 UTC−3

Denmark
2

			1	2	3
1	(India) (Denmark)	Krishna Prasad Garaga / Dhruv Kapila; Mads Muurholm / Mads Vestergaard	21; 18	21; 15
2	(India) (Denmark)	Gayathri Gopichand; Line Christophersen	16; 21	21; 11	13; 21
3	(India) (Denmark)	Kiran George; Oscar Sunakaer	21; 13	21; 8
4	(India) (Denmark)	Tanisha Crasto / Gayathri Gopichand; Amalie Magelund / Freja Ravn	19; 21	17; 21
5	(India) (Denmark)	Srikrishna Sai Kumar Podile / Srishti Jupudi; Rasmus Espersen / Christine Busch	12; 21	21; 17	21; 19

==== 7th–8th place match ====
Chinese Taipei
3
Markham Pan Am Centre, Court 4
10 November 2018
08:30 UTC−3

Denmark
1

			1	2	3
1	(Chinese Taipei) (Denmark)	Chang Kai-wen / Lu Chih-wei; Mads Muurholm / Mads Vestergaard	21; 11	21; 19
2	(Chinese Taipei) (Denmark)	Hung En-tzu; Line Christophersen	14; 21	21; 17	18; 21
3	(Chinese Taipei) (Denmark)	Yu Sheng-po; Magnus Johannesen	21; 5	21; 16
4	(Chinese Taipei) (Denmark)	Li Zi-qing / Teng Chun-hsun; Christine Busch / Amalie Schulz	21; 16	21; 13
5	(Chinese Taipei) (Denmark)	Lin Yu-chieh / Wang Yu-qiao; Daniel Lundgaard / Amalie Magelund				not played

==== 5th–6th place match ====
Malaysia
3
Markham Pan Am Centre, Court 1
10 November 2018
08:30 UTC−3

India
1

			1	2	3
1	(Malaysia) (India)	Chia Wei Jie / Chua Yue Chern; Dhruv Kapila / Krishna Prasad Garaga	19; 21	21; 15	18; 21
2	(Malaysia) (India)	Eoon Qi Xuan; Purva Barve	17; 21	21; 14	21; 16
3	(Malaysia) (India)	Ng Tze Yong; Lakshya Sen	21; 18	21; 14
4	(Malaysia) (India)	Goh Jin Wei / Pearly Tan Koong Le; Gayathri Gopichand / Tanisha Crasto	21; 11	21; 15
5	(Malaysia) (India)	Chia Wei Jie / Toh Ee Wei; Srikrishna Sai Kumar Podile / Srishti Jupudi				not played

==== 1st to 4th semifinals ====
China
3
Markham Pan Am Centre, Court 1
9 November 2018
16:30 UTC−3

Japan
2

			1	2	3
1	(China) (Japan)	Guo Xinwa / Liu Xuanxuan; Hiroki Midorikawa / Natsu Saito	21; 17	21; 23	12; 21
2	(China) (Japan)	Li Shifeng; Kodai Naraoka	12; 21	21; 19	18; 21
3	(China) (Japan)	Di Zijian / Wang Chang; Hiroki Midorikawa / Hiroki Nakayama	21; 14	21; 17
4	(China) (Japan)	Wang Zhiyi; Hirari Mizui	14; 21	21; 12	22; 20
5	(China) (Japan)	Liu Xuanxuan / Xia Yuting; Shiena Fukumoto / Natsu Saito	21; 13	21; 15

South Korea
3
Markham Pan Am Centre, Court 4
9 November 2018
16:30 UTC−3

Indonesia
1

			1	2	3
1	(South Korea) (Indonesia)	Shin Tae-yang / Wang Chan; Leo Rolly Carnando / Daniel Marthin	21; 18	16; 21	21; 17
2	(South Korea) (Indonesia)	Park Ga-eun; Putri Kusuma Wardani	21; 18	21; 18
3	(South Korea) (Indonesia)	Jeong U-min; Ikhsan Rumbay	7; 21	14; 21
4	(South Korea) (Indonesia)	Jang Eun-seo / Lee Jung-hyun; Febriana Dwipuji Kusuma / Ribka Sugiarto	21; 19	21; 17
5	(South Korea) (Indonesia)	Jeong Na-eun / Wang Chan; Rehan Naufal Kusharjanto / Siti Fadia Silva Ramadhanti				not played

==== Final ====
China
3
Markham Pan Am Centre, Court 1
10 November 2018
14:00 UTC−3

South Korea
1

			1	2	3
1	(China) (South Korea)	Di Zijian / Wang Chang; Shin Tae-yang / Wang Chan	21; 18	17; 21	16; 21
2	(China) (South Korea)	Wang Zhiyi; Park Ga-eun	21; 23	21; 16	21; 10
3	(China) (South Korea)	Li Shifeng; Choi Ji-hoon	21; 13	22; 20
4	(China) (South Korea)	Liu Xuanxuan / Xia Yuting; Jang Eun-seo / Lee Jung-hyun	21; 14	21; 15
5	(China) (South Korea)	Guo Xinwa / Li Yijing; Wang Chan / Jeong Na-eun				not played

=== 9th to 16th ===
13th–14th place match
B	Sweden	3
H	England	2
15th–16th place match
D	France	3
E	Sri Lanka	1

13th to 16th semifinals
B	Sweden	3
D	France	2
E	Sri Lanka	0
H	England	3

9th to 16th quarterfinals
A	Hong Kong	3
B	Sweden	0
C	Thailand	3
D	France	2
E	Sri Lanka	1
F	Scotland	3
G	Singapore	3
H	England	0

9th to 12th semifinals
A	Hong Kong	0
C	Thailand	3
F	Scotland	1
G	Singapore	3

9th–10th place match
C	Thailand	3
G	Singapore	0
11th–12th place match
A	Hong Kong	3
F	Scotland	0

=== 17th to 24th ===
21st–22nd place match
A	Germany	3
H	Mexico	0
23rd–24th place match
C	Peru	3
E	Faroe Islands	1

21st to 24th semifinals
A	Germany	3
C	Peru	0
E	Faroe Islands	0
H	Mexico	3

17th to 24th quarterfinals
A	Germany	1
B	Canada	3
C	Peru	1
D	Brazil	3
E	Faroe Islands	0
F	Czech Republic	3
G	United States	3
H	Mexico	2

17th to 20th semifinals
B	Canada	3
D	Brazil	1
F	Czech Republic	0
G	United States	3

17th–18th place match
B	Canada	3
G	United States	1
19th–20th place match
D	Brazil	3
F	Czech Republic	0

=== 25th to 32nd ===
29th–30th place match
A	Netherlands	3
E	Kenya	0
31st–32nd place match
C	South Africa	3
G	Guyana	0

29th to 32nd semifinals
A	Netherlands	3
C	South Africa	0
E	Kenya	3
G	Guyana	2

25th to 32nd quarterfinals
A	Netherlands	1
B	Ukraine	3
C	South Africa	0
D	Norway	3
E	Kenya	0
F	Spain	3
G	Guyana	0
H	Austria	3

25th to 28th semifinals
B	Ukraine	3
D	Norway	1
F	Spain	3
H	Austria	2

25th–26th place match
B	Ukraine	3
F	Spain	0
27th–28th place match
D	Norway	3
H	Austria	2

=== 33rd to 39th ===
37th–38th place match
B	Poland	3
H	Macau	2
39th place
C	Mongolia

37th to 39th semifinals
B	Poland	3
C	Mongolia	1
BYE
H	Macau

33rd to 39th quarterfinals
A	New Zealand	3
B	Poland	1
C	Mongolia	0
D	Uganda	3
BYE
F	Slovakia
A	Australia	3
H	Macau	1

33rd to 36th semifinals
A	New Zealand	3
D	Uganda	0
F	Slovakia	3
A	Australia	1

33rd–34th place match
A	New Zealand	1
F	Slovakia	3
35th–36th place match
D	Uganda	0
A	Australia	3

== Final standings ==
1. China
2. South Korea
3. Japan
3. Indonesia
5. Malaysia
6. India
7. Chinese Taipei
8. Denmark
9. Thailand
10. Singapore
11. Hong Kong
12. Scotland
13. Sweden
14. England
15. France
16. Sri Lanka
17. Canada
18. United States
19. Brazil
20. Czech Republic
21. Germany
22. Mexico
23. Peru
24. Faroe Islands
25. Ukraine
26. Spain
27. Norway
28. Austria
29. Netherlands
30. Kenya
31. South Africa
32. Guyana
33. Slovakia
34. New Zealand
35. Australia
36. Uganda (Debut)
37. Poland
38. Macau
39. Mongolia
