= 2023 German Open (badminton) =

Badminton tournament in Mülheim

Tournament details
- Dates: 7–12 March
- Edition: 64th
- Level: Super 300
- Total prize money: US$210,000
- Venue: Westenergie Sporthalle
- Location: Mülheim, Germany

Champions
- Men's singles: (Hong Kong) Ng Ka Long
- Women's singles: (Japan) Akane Yamaguchi
- Men's doubles: (South Korea) Choi Sol-gyu (South Korea) Kim Won-ho
- Women's doubles: (South Korea) Baek Ha-na (South Korea) Lee So-hee
- Mixed doubles: (China) Feng Yanzhe (China) Huang Dongping

The 2023 German Open (officially known as the Yonex German Open 2023 for sponsorship reasons) was a badminton tournament that took place at the Westenergie Sporthalle in Mülheim, Germany, from 7 to 12 March 2023 and had a total prize pool of $210,000.

== Tournament ==
The 2023 German Open was the fifth tournament of the 2023 BWF World Tour and was part of the German Open championships, which had been held since 1955. The tournament was organized by Vermarktungsgesellschaft Badminton Deutschland (VBD) mbH for the German Badminton Association with sanction from the Badminton World Federation.

=== Venue ===
This international tournament was held at the Westenergie Sporthalle at Mülheim, Germany.

=== Point distribution ===
Below is the point distribution table for each phase of the tournament based on the BWF points system for the BWF World Tour Super 300 event.

Winner	Runner-up	3/4	5/8	9/16	17/32	33/64	65/128
7,000	5,950	4,900	3,850	2,750	1,670	660	320

=== Prize pool ===
The total prize money for this tournament was US$210,000, distributed of the prize money in accordance with BWF regulations.

Event	Winner	Finalist	Semi-finals	Quarter-finals	Last 16
Singles	$15,750	$7,980	$3,045	$1,260	$735
Doubles	$16,590	$7,980	$2,940	$1,522.50	$787.50

== Men's singles ==
=== Seeds ===
1. (Malaysia) Lee Zii Jia (second round)
2. (Thailand) Kunlavut Vitidsarn (first round)
3. (Japan) Kodai Naraoka (first round)
4. (Singapore) Loh Kean Yew (second round)
5. (China) Lu Guangzu (quarter-finals)
6. (India) Lakshya Sen (first round)
7. (China) Zhao Junpeng (second round)
8. (China) Shi Yuqi (first round)

=== Finals ===
Semi-finals
(Hong Kong) Lee Cheuk Yiu	14	21	15
(Hong Kong) Ng Ka Long	21	14	21
(Japan) Kento Momota	11	7
(China) Li Shifeng	21	21

Final
(Hong Kong) Ng Ka Long	20	21	21
(China) Li Shifeng	22	18	18

=== Top half ===
==== Section 1 ====
First round
1	(Malaysia) Lee Z J	21	21
Q3	(Denmark) M Johannesen	11	5
(Israel) M Zilberman	8	11
PFQ	(Chinese Taipei) Lee C-h	21	21
6	(India) L Sen	19	16
(France) C Popov	21	21
(Denmark) V Svendsen	14	19
(Hong Kong) Lee C Y	21	21

Second round
1	(Malaysia) Lee Z J	21	20	21
PFQ	(Chinese Taipei) Lee C-h	15	22	23
(France) C Popov	19	19
(Hong Kong) Lee C Y	21	21

Quarter-finals
PFQ	(Chinese Taipei) Lee C-h	21	14
(Hong Kong) Lee C Y	23	21

==== Section 2 ====
First round
3	(Japan) K Naraoka	23	14	5^{r}
(Hong Kong) Ng K L	21	21	11
PFQ	(Spain) L E Peñalver	16	21	22
PFQ	(Denmark) M Christophersen	21	19	20
5	(China) Lu GZ	21	21
Q2	(Czech Republic) J Louda	12	17
(Malaysia) Liew D	18	17
(Japan) K Tsuneyama	21	21

Second round
(Hong Kong) Ng K L	21	21
PFQ	(Spain) L E Peñalver	16	12
5	(China) Lu GZ	21	22
(Japan) K Tsuneyama	12	20

Quarter-finals
(Hong Kong) Ng K L	17	8
5	(China) Lu GZ	21	6^{r}

=== Bottom half ===
==== Section 3 ====
First round
(France) T J Popov	14	19
(Canada) B Yang	21	21
(Japan) K Momota	21	21
8	(China) Shi YQ	16	15
(Japan) K Nishimoto	21	21
(Malaysia) Cheam J W	10	15
(India) M Manjunath	8	21	11
4	(Singapore) Loh K Y	21	19	21

Second round
(Canada) B Yang	16	10
(Japan) K Momota	21	21
(Japan) K Nishimoto	21	13	21
4	(Singapore) Loh K Y	17	21	19

Quarter-finals
(Japan) K Momota	15	21	21
(Japan) K Nishimoto	21	17	12

==== Section 4 ====
First round
(Chinese Taipei) Lin C-y	18	21	21
(Netherlands) M Caljouw	21	12	10
Q1	(Azerbaijan) A R Dwicahyo	18	17
7	(China) Zhao JP	21	21
(Denmark) H-K Vittinghus	21	21
Q4	(France) A Lanier	19	16
(China) Li SF	21	7
2	(Thailand) K Vitidsarn	15	4^{r}

Second round
(Chinese Taipei) Lin C-y	23	15	21
7	(China) Zhao JP	21	21	17
(Denmark) H-K Vittinghus	14	12
(China) Li SF	21	21

Quarter-finals
(Chinese Taipei) Lin C-y	7	20
(China) Li SF	21	22

== Women's singles ==
=== Seeds ===
1. (Japan) Akane Yamaguchi (champion)
2. (South Korea) An Se-young (final)
3. (China) Chen Yufei (semi-finals)
4. (China) He Bingjiao (semi-finals)
5. (China) Wang Zhiyi (quarter-finals)
6. (Thailand) Ratchanok Intanon (withdrew)
7. (China) Han Yue (first round)
8. (Thailand) Pornpawee Chochuwong (quarter-finals)

=== Finals ===
Semi-finals
1	(Japan) Akane Yamaguchi	21	21
3	(China) Chen Yufei	18	16
4	(China) He Bingjiao	12	13
2	(South Korea) An Se-young	21	21

Final
1	(Japan) Akane Yamaguchi	21	21
2	(South Korea) An Se-young	11	14

=== Top half ===
==== Section 1 ====
First round
1	(Japan) A Yamaguchi	21	21
(Thailand) L Chaiwan	19	14
(Scotland) K Gilmour	21	14	13
(China) Zhang YM	18	21	21
5	(China) Wang ZY	21	21
(India) M Bansod	13	14
(Japan) A Ohori	19	20
(Germany) Y Li	21	22

Second round
1	(Japan) A Yamaguchi	21	21
(China) Zhang YM	11	14
5	(China) Wang ZY	21	21
(Germany) Y Li	12	16

Quarter-finals
1	(Japan) A Yamaguchi	21	16	21
5	(China) Wang ZY	18	21	14

==== Section 2 ====
First round
3	(China) Chen YF	21	21
(United States) I Wang	9	11
(France) Qi XF	21	21
(Spain) C Azurmendi	10	9
8	(Thailand) P Chochuwong	21	21
Q3	(India) T Mir	8	10
(Belgium) L Tan	21	13
(Malaysia) Goh J W	23	21

Second round
3	(China) Chen YF	21	21
(France) Qi XF	13	13
8	(Thailand) P Chochuwong	21	21
(Malaysia) Goh J W	13	10

Quarter-finals
3	(China) Chen YF	21	21
8	(Thailand) P Chochuwong	15	18

=== Bottom half ===
==== Section 3 ====
First round
Q2	(Switzerland) J Stadelmann	12	17
PFQ	(Canada) Zhang W Y	21	21
(Chinese Taipei) Hsu W-c	21	21
PFQ	(France) L Huet	11	5
(Japan) S Kawakami	21	21
PFQ	(United States) L Lam	18	13
(Estonia) K Kuuba	15	17
4	(China) He BJ	21	21

Second round
PFQ	(Canada) Zhang W Y	20	15
(Chinese Taipei) Hsu W-c	22	21
(Japan) S Kawakami	21	9	14
4	(China) He BJ	15	21	21

Quarter-finals
(Chinese Taipei) Hsu W-c	17	13
4	(China) He BJ	21	21

==== Section 4 ====
First round
(South Korea) Kim G-e	21	21
Q4	(Myanmar) Thet Htar T	9	11
(Thailand) S Katethong	21	18	21
7	(China) Han Y	16	21	17
Q1	(Ukraine) P Buhrova	21	17	17
(Chinese Taipei) Sung S-y	16	21	21
(Japan) R Gunji	13	8
2	(South Korea) An S-y	21	21

Second round
(South Korea) Kim G-e	21	21
(Thailand) S Katethong	14	13
(Chinese Taipei) Sung S-y	12	6
2	(South Korea) An S-y	21	21

Quarter-finals
(South Korea) Kim G-e	18	6
2	(South Korea) An S-y	21	21

== Men's doubles ==
=== Seeds ===
1. (Malaysia) Aaron Chia / Soh Wooi Yik (second round)
2. (Japan) Takuro Hoki / Yugo Kobayashi (quarter-finals)
3. (China) Liu Yuchen / Ou Xuanyi (first round)
4. (Denmark) Kim Astrup / Anders Skaarup Rasmussen (quarter-finals)
5. (Malaysia) Ong Yew Sin / Teo Ee Yi (second round)
6. (China) Liang Weikeng / Wang Chang (first round)
7. (South Korea) Choi Sol-gyu / Kim Won-ho (champions)
8. (Germany) Mark Lamsfuß / Marvin Seidel (second round)

=== Finals ===
Semi-finals
(Japan) Akira Koga (Japan) Taichi Saito	21	16	12
7	(South Korea) Choi Sol-gyu (South Korea) Kim Won-ho	18	21	21
(South Korea) Kang Min-hyuk (South Korea) Seo Seung-jae	21	21
(Chinese Taipei) Lee Jhe-huei (Chinese Taipei) Yang Po-hsuan	13	19

Final
7	(South Korea) Choi Sol-gyu (South Korea) Kim Won-ho	21	18	21
(South Korea) Kang Min-hyuk (South Korea) Seo Seung-jae	19	21	19

=== Top half ===
==== Section 1 ====
First round
(Malaysia) Man W C (Malaysia) Tee K W
(Japan) A Koga (Japan) T Saito	w	/	o
8	(Germany) M Lamsfuß (Germany) M Seidel	19	21	21
(Germany) B Geiss (Germany) J C Völker	21	14	18
(Germany) D Hess (Germany) P Scheiel
(Denmark) J Bay (Denmark) L Mølhede	w	/	o

Second round
1	(Malaysia) A Chia (Malaysia) Soh W Y	13	18
(Japan) A Koga (Japan) T Saito	21	21
8	(Germany) M Lamsfuß (Germany) M Seidel	17	15
(Denmark) J Bay (Denmark) L Mølhede	21	21

Quarter-finals
(Japan) A Koga (Japan) T Saito	21	21
(Denmark) J Bay (Denmark) L Mølhede	9	18

==== Section 2 ====
First round
4	(Denmark) K Astrup (Denmark) A S Rasmussen	21	21
(Japan) K Matsui (Japan) Y Takeuchi	15	17
(Azerbaijan) A R Dwicahyo (Azerbaijan) A Qowimuramadhoni	12	12
(South Korea) Kim G-j (South Korea) Kim S-r	21	21
7	(South Korea) Choi S-g (South Korea) Kim W-h	21	21
(Republic of Ireland) J Magee (Republic of Ireland) P Reynolds	10	12
(Denmark) R Kjær (Denmark) F Søgaard	21	21
(Netherlands) R Jille (Netherlands) T van der Lecq	16	16

Second round
4	(Denmark) K Astrup (Denmark) A S Rasmussen	21	15	21
(South Korea) Kim G-j (South Korea) Kim S-r	19	21	19
7	(South Korea) Choi S-g (South Korea) Kim W-h	22	21
(Denmark) R Kjær (Denmark) F Søgaard	20	15

Quarter-finals
4	(Denmark) K Astrup (Denmark) A S Rasmussen	22	17
7	(South Korea) Choi S-g (South Korea) Kim W-h	24	21

=== Bottom half ===
==== Section 3 ====
First round
(Scotland) C Grimley (Scotland) M Grimley	18	15
(France) L Corvée (France) R Labar	21	21
(Chinese Taipei) Chang K-c (Chinese Taipei) Wang C-l	21	21
6	(China) Liang WK (China) Wang C	18	13
(Scotland) A Dunn (Scotland) A Hall
(Malaysia) Tan K M (Malaysia) Tan W K	w	/	o
(South Korea) Kang M-h (South Korea) Seo S-j	21	21
3	(China) Liu YC (China) Ou XY	19	19

Second round
(France) L Corvée (France) R Labar	14	11
(Chinese Taipei) Chang K-c (Chinese Taipei) Wang C-l	21	21
(Malaysia) Tan K M (Malaysia) Tan W K	15	17
(South Korea) Kang M-h (South Korea) Seo S-j	21	21

Quarter-finals
(Chinese Taipei) Chang K-c (Chinese Taipei) Wang C-l	17	19
(South Korea) Kang M-h (South Korea) Seo S-j	21	21

==== Section 4 ====
First round
(Canada) A Dong (Canada) N Yakura	8	9
(Chinese Taipei) Lee J-h (Chinese Taipei) Yang P-hs	21	21
(Chinese Taipei) Lee F-c (Chinese Taipei) Lee Y	21	20	15
5	(Malaysia) Ong Y S (Malaysia) Teo E Y	17	22	21
(Czech Republic) O Král (Czech Republic) A Mendrek	21	21
(Switzerland) I Santoro (England) R Webster	4	2
(France) C Popov (France) T J Popov	21	8
2	(Japan) T Hoki (Japan) Y Kobayashi	23	21

Second round
(Chinese Taipei) Lee J-h (Chinese Taipei) Yang P-hs	18	21	21
5	(Malaysia) Ong Y S (Malaysia) Teo E Y	21	18	18
(Czech Republic) O Král (Czech Republic) A Mendrek	17	11
2	(Japan) T Hoki (Japan) Y Kobayashi	21	21

Quarter-finals
(Chinese Taipei) Lee J-h (Chinese Taipei) Yang P-hs	21	21
2	(Japan) T Hoki (Japan) Y Kobayashi	15	19

== Women's doubles ==
=== Seeds ===
1. (Japan) Nami Matsuyama / Chiharu Shida (final)
2. (South Korea) Jeong Na-eun / Kim Hye-jeong (quarter-finals)
3. (Malaysia) Pearly Tan / Thinaah Muralitharan (semi-finals)
4. (South Korea) Kim So-yeong / Kong Hee-yong (semi-finals)
5. (Japan) Yuki Fukushima / Sayaka Hirota (quarter-finals)
6. (Japan) Mayu Matsumoto / Wakana Nagahara (quarter-finals)
7. (Bulgaria) Gabriela Stoeva / Stefani Stoeva (quarter-finals)
8. (South Korea) Baek Ha-na / Lee So-hee (champions)

=== Finals ===
Semi-finals
1	(Japan) Nami Matsuyama (Japan) Chiharu Shida	24	21
3	(Malaysia) Pearly Tan (Malaysia) Thinaah Muralitharan	22	13
4	(South Korea) Kim So-yeong (South Korea) Kong Hee-yong	18	18
8	(South Korea) Baek Ha-na (South Korea) Lee So-hee	21	21

Final
1	(Japan) Nami Matsuyama (Japan) Chiharu Shida	19	15
8	(South Korea) Baek Ha-na (South Korea) Lee So-hee	21	21

=== Top half ===
==== Section 1 ====
First round
1	(Japan) N Matsuyama (Japan) C Shida	21	21
(Estonia) K-K Marran (Estonia) H Rüütel	14	7
(Germany) S Küspert (Germany) E Moszczynski	21	21
Q2	(Netherlands) K de Wit (Netherlands) A Tirtosentono	18	19
5	(Japan) Y Fukushima (Japan) S Hirota	21	21
(Ukraine) M Stoliarenko (Ukraine) Y Zharka	10	7
(Japan) R Hirokami (Japan) Y Kato	21	21
(Italy) M Corsini (Italy) J Mair	12	15

Second round
1	(Japan) N Matsuyama (Japan) C Shida	21	21
(Germany) S Küspert (Germany) E Moszczynski	12	16
5	(Japan) Y Fukushima (Japan) S Hirota	21	21
(Japan) R Hirokami (Japan) Y Kato	12	17

Quarter-finals
1	(Japan) N Matsuyama (Japan) C Shida	27	21
5	(Japan) Y Fukushima (Japan) S Hirota	25	15

==== Section 2 ====
First round
3	(Malaysia) P Tan (Malaysia) Thinaah M	21	21
(Republic of Ireland) K Frost (Republic of Ireland) M Ryan	7	8
PFQ	(United States) P L Cao Hok (United States) L Lam	17	15
(Scotland) J MacPherson (Scotland) C Torrance	21	21
(United States) A Xu (United States) K Xu	15	12
(Hong Kong) Yeung N T (Hong Kong) Yeung P L	21	21

Second round
3	(Malaysia) P Tan (Malaysia) Thinaah M	21	21
(Scotland) J MacPherson (Scotland) C Torrance	18	15
6	(Japan) M Matsumoto (Japan) W Nagahara	21	21
(Hong Kong) Yeung N T (Hong Kong) Yeung P L	12	16

Quarter-finals
3	(Malaysia) P Tan (Malaysia) Thinaah M	21	18	21
6	(Japan) M Matsumoto (Japan) W Nagahara	17	21	11

=== Bottom half ===
==== Section 3 ====
First round
(France) M Lambert (France) A Tran	19	18
(Japan) R Iwanaga (Japan) K Nakanishi	21	21
(Netherlands) D Jille (Netherlands) C Seinen
7	(Bulgaria) G Stoeva (Bulgaria) S Stoeva	w	/	o
(England) C Birch (England) L Smith	21	21
(Germany) L Efler (Germany) I Lohau	19	16
(China) Li WM (China) Liu XX	21	15	19
4	(South Korea) Kim S-y (South Korea) Kong H-y	18	21	21

Second round
(Japan) R Iwanaga (Japan) K Nakanishi	20	16
7	(Bulgaria) G Stoeva (Bulgaria) S Stoeva	22	21
(England) C Birch (England) L Smith	13	10
4	(South Korea) Kim S-y (South Korea) Kong H-y	21	21

Quarter-finals
7	(Bulgaria) G Stoeva (Bulgaria) S Stoeva	21	15	13
4	(South Korea) Kim S-y (South Korea) Kong H-y	18	21	21

==== Section 4 ====
First round
(United States) S Gurazada (United States) I Jaiswal	11	15
(Hong Kong) Ng T Y (Hong Kong) Tsang H Y	21	21
(Denmark) M Fruergaard (Denmark) S Thygesen	13	16
8	(South Korea) Baek H-n (South Korea) Lee S-h	21	21
Q3	(China) Du Y (China) Xia YT	21	21
Q4	(Austria) S Au Yeong (Austria) K Hochmeir	4	9
(Malaysia) V Hoo (Malaysia) Lim C S	12	0^{r}
2	(South Korea) Jeong N-e (South Korea) Kim H-j	21	0

Second round
(Hong Kong) Ng T Y (Hong Kong) Tsang H Y	8	13
8	(South Korea) Baek H-n (South Korea) Lee S-h	21	21
Q3	(China) Du Y (China) Xia YT	14	5
2	(South Korea) Jeong N-e (South Korea) Kim H-j	21	21

Quarter-finals
8	(South Korea) Baek H-n (South Korea) Lee S-h	21	18	23
2	(South Korea) Jeong N-e (South Korea) Kim H-j	11	21	21

== Mixed doubles ==
=== Seeds ===
1. (Japan) Yuta Watanabe / Arisa Higashino (second round)
2. (France) Thom Gicquel / Delphine Delrue (quarter-finals)
3. (Malaysia) Tan Kian Meng / Lai Pei Jing (first round)
4. (Germany) Mark Lamsfuß / Isabel Lohau (second round)
5. (China) Feng Yanzhe / Huang Dongping (champions)
6. (South Korea) Seo Seung-jae / Chae Yoo-jung (second round)
7. (Netherlands) Robin Tabeling / Selena Piek (withdrew)
8. (Japan) Yuki Kaneko / Misaki Matsutomo (second round)

=== Finals ===
Semi-finals
(South Korea) Kim Won-ho (South Korea) Jeong Na-eun	14	21	21
(Japan) Kyohei Yamashita (Japan) Naru Shinoya	21	19	19
5	(China) Feng Yanzhe (China) Huang Dongping	21	21
(Japan) Hiroki Midorikawa (Japan) Natsu Saito	16	16

Final
(South Korea) Kim Won-ho (South Korea) Jeong Na-eun	4	15
5	(China) Feng Yanzhe (China) Huang Dongping	21	21

=== Top half ===
==== Section 1 ====
First round
1	(Japan) Y Watanabe (Japan) A Higashino	14	21	21
(South Korea) Ko S-h (South Korea) Eom H-w	21	13	10
(Israel) M Zilberman (Israel) S Zilberman	7	11
(South Korea) Kim W-h (South Korea) Jeong N-e	21	21
6	(South Korea) Seo S-j (South Korea) Chae Y-j	21	21
Q4	(Republic of Ireland) J Magee (Republic of Ireland) M Ryan	8	11
(Malaysia) Chen T J (Malaysia) Toh E W	21	20	21
(Malaysia) Hoo P R (Malaysia) Teoh M X	12	22	14

Second round
1	(Japan) Y Watanabe (Japan) A Higashino	15	16
(South Korea) Kim W-h (South Korea) Jeong N-e	21	21
6	(South Korea) Seo S-j (South Korea) Chae Y-j	11	22
(Malaysia) Chen T J (Malaysia) Toh E W	21	24

Quarter-finals
(South Korea) Kim W-h (South Korea) Jeong N-e	22	21
(Malaysia) Chen T J (Malaysia) Toh E W	20	14

==== Section 2 ====
First round
3	(Malaysia) Tan K M (Malaysia) Lai P J	14	14
(Indonesia) D Ferdinansyah (Indonesia) G E Widjaja	21	21
(Hong Kong) Lee C H (Hong Kong) Ng T Y	21	21
PFQ	(Germany) J C Völker (Germany) S Küspert	9	12
PFQ	(Serbia) M Tomic (Serbia) A Vitman	10	17
(Hong Kong) Tang C M (Hong Kong) Tse Y S	21	21
(Japan) K Yamashita (Japan) N Shinoya	21	21
(England) G Mairs (England) J Moore	13	19

Second round
(Indonesia) D Ferdinansyah (Indonesia) G E Widjaja	19	19
(Hong Kong) Lee C H (Hong Kong) Ng T Y	21	21
(Hong Kong) Tang C M (Hong Kong) Tse Y S	8	19
(Japan) K Yamashita (Japan) N Shinoya	21	21

Quarter-finals
(Hong Kong) Lee C H (Hong Kong) Ng T Y	14	13
(Japan) K Yamashita (Japan) N Shinoya	21	21

=== Bottom half ===
==== Section 3 ====
First round
(Indonesia) P Jordan (Indonesia) M D Oktavianti	21	19	21
Q1	(Germany) B Geiss (Germany) E Moszczynski	13	21	13
Q2	(Germany) P Scheiel (Germany) F Volkmann	15	10
5	(China) Feng YZ (China) Huang DP	21	21
(Chinese Taipei) Yang P-hs (Chinese Taipei) Hu L-f	22	16	21
(Germany) J R Jansen (Germany) L Efler	20	21	10
(Algeria) K Mammeri (Algeria) T Mammeri	10	11
4	(Germany) M Lamsfuß (Germany) I Lohau	21	21

Second round
(Indonesia) P Jordan (Indonesia) M D Oktavianti	15	19
5	(China) Feng YZ (China) Huang DP	21	21
(Chinese Taipei) Yang P-hs (Chinese Taipei) Hu L-f	21	21
4	(Germany) M Lamsfuß (Germany) I Lohau	13	18

Quarter-finals
5	(China) Feng YZ (China) Huang DP	21	21
(Chinese Taipei) Yang P-hs (Chinese Taipei) Hu L-f	7	14

==== Section 4 ====
First round
Q3	(Denmark) S Bugtrup (Denmark) M Surrow	18	21	19
(Japan) H Midorikawa (Japan) N Saito	21	17	21
(Chinese Taipei) Chang K-c (Chinese Taipei) Lee C-c	10	11
8	(Japan) Y Kaneko (Japan) M Matsutomo	21	21
(India) B. S Reddy (India) A Ponnappa	10	12
(Scotland) A Hall (Scotland) J MacPherson	21	21
(Denmark) J Toft (Denmark) C Graversen	19	17
2	(France) T Gicquel (France) D Delrue	21	21

Second round
(Japan) H Midorikawa (Japan) N Saito	21	21
8	(Japan) Y Kaneko (Japan) M Matsutomo	16	19
(Scotland) A Hall (Scotland) J MacPherson	13	18
2	(France) T Gicquel (France) D Delrue	21	21

Quarter-finals
(Japan) H Midorikawa (Japan) N Saito	21	21
2	(France) T Gicquel (France) D Delrue	16	13

Preceded by 2023 Thailand Masters	BWF World Tour; 2023 BWF season	Succeeded by 2023 All England Open; 2023 Ruichang China Masters
