= 2023 Canada Open =

Tournament details
- Dates: 4 July – 9 July
- Edition: 58th
- Level: Super 500
- Total prize money: US$420,000
- Venue: Markin-MacPhail Centre
- Location: Calgary, Alberta, Canada

Champions
- Men's singles: (India) Lakshya Sen
- Women's singles: (Japan) Akane Yamaguchi
- Men's doubles: (Denmark) Kim Astrup (Denmark) Anders Skaarup Rasmussen
- Women's doubles: (Japan) Nami Matsuyama (Japan) Chiharu Shida
- Mixed doubles: (Japan) Hiroki Midorikawa (Japan) Natsu Saito

The 2023 Canada Open (officially known as the Yonex Canada Open 2023 for sponsorship reasons) was a badminton tournament which took place at Markin-MacPhail Centre in Calgary, Canada, from 4 July to 9 July 2023 and had a total purse of $420,000.

== Tournament ==
The 2023 Canada Open will be the fourth Super 500 tournament of the 2023 BWF World Tour and also part of the Canada Open championships, which has been held since 1957. This tournament is organized by the Badminton Alberta and Badminton Canada and sanctioned by the BWF. Started from 2023, the Canada Open has moved from the entry level of BWF World Tour Super 100 up two levels to Super 500.

=== Venue ===
This international tournament was held at the Markin-MacPhail Centre, WinSport in Calgary, Alberta, Canada.

=== Point distribution ===
Below is the point distribution table for each phase of the tournament based on the BWF points system for the BWF World Tour Super 500 event.

Winner	Runner-up	3/4	5/8	9/16	17/32	33/64	65/128
9,200	7,800	6,420	5,040	3,600	2,220	880	430

=== Prize pool ===
The total prize money was US$420,000 with the distribution of the prize money in accordance with BWF regulations.

Event	Winner	Finalist	Semi-finals	Quarter-finals	Last 16
Singles	$31,500	$15,960	$6,090	$2,520	$1,470
Doubles	$33,180	$15,960	$5,880	$3,045	$1,575

== Men's singles ==
=== Seeds ===
1. (Denmark) Viktor Axelsen (Withdrew)
2. (Thailand) Kunlavut Vitidsarn (First round)
3. (Japan) Kodai Naraoka (Semi-finals)
4. (Japan) Kenta Nishimoto (Semi-finals)
5. (China) Li Shifeng (Final)
6. (Hong Kong) Lee Cheuk Yiu (Second round)
7. (Japan) Kanta Tsuneyama (First round)
8. (Hong Kong) Ng Ka Long (Second round)

=== Finals ===
Semi-finals
5	(China) Li Shifeng	21	21
3	(Japan) Kodai Naraoka	8	11
4	(Japan) Kenta Nishimoto	17	14
(India) Lakshya Sen	21	21

Final
5	(China) Li Shifeng	18	20
(India) Lakshya Sen	21	22

=== Top half ===
==== Section 1 ====
First round
PFQ	(France) A Merklé	21	21
Q3	(Spain) P Abián	8	13
(Republic of Ireland) N Nguyen	14	11
(Japan) K Watanabe	21	21
5	(China) Li SF	8	21	21
(Denmark) H-K Vittinghus	21	16	10
Q1	(Germany) F Roth	21	21
(Japan) K Momota	17	16

Second round
PFQ	(France) A Merklé	16	21	14
(Japan) K Watanabe	21	19	21
5	(China) Li SF	21	21
Q1	(Germany) F Roth	7	14

Quarter-finals
(Japan) K Watanabe	21	21	12
5	(China) Li SF	15	23	21

==== Section 2 ====
First round
3	(Japan) K Naraoka	21	21
(Spain) L E Peñalver	12	11
(China) Weng HY	20	12
(Czech Republic) J Louda	22	21
8	(Hong Kong) Ng K L	21	21
(Chinese Taipei) Lee C-h	16	12
Q4	(China) Lei LX	21	21
(Thailand) K Wangcharoen	11	10

Second round
3	(Japan) K Naraoka	21	21
(Czech Republic) J Louda	18	12
8	(Hong Kong) Ng K L	21	17
Q4	(China) Lei LX	23	21

Quarter-finals
3	(Japan) K Naraoka	21	18	21
Q4	(China) Lei LX	18	21	14

=== Bottom half ===
==== Section 3 ====
First round
(Denmark) M Johannesen	21	21
PFQ	(Denmark) M Christophersen	13	10
(Malaysia) Cheam J W	16	15
6	(Hong Kong) Lee C Y	21	21
(Chinese Taipei) Lin C-y	20	17
(Chinese Taipei) Chi Y-j	22	21
(Chinese Taipei) Su L-y	14	10
4	(Japan) K Nishimoto	21	21

Second round
(Denmark) M Johannesen	21	22
6	(Hong Kong) Lee C Y	13	20
(Chinese Taipei) Chi Y-j	21	11	15
4	(Japan) K Nishimoto	16	21	21

Quarter-finals
(Denmark) M Johannesen	15	21	14
4	(Japan) K Nishimoto	21	7	21

==== Section 4 ====
First round
(Israel) M Zilberman	21	13	21
(Canada) B Yang	13	21	15
Q2	(Belgium) J Carraggi	21	19	21
7	(Japan) K Tsuneyama	16	21	15
PFQ	(Brazil) Y Coelho	21	21
PFQ	(India) B S Praneeth	12	17
(India) L Sen	21	21
2	(Thailand) K Vitidsarn	18	15

Second round
(Israel) M Zilberman	21	13
Q2	(Belgium) J Carraggi	23	21
PFQ	(Brazil) Y Coelho	15	11
(India) L Sen	21	21

Quarter-finals
Q2	(Belgium) J Carraggi	8	21	10
(India) L Sen	21	17	21

== Women's singles ==
=== Seeds ===
1. (Japan) Akane Yamaguchi (Champion)
2. (Thailand) Ratchanok Intanon (Final)
3. (Thailand) Busanan Ongbamrungphan (First round)
4. (India) P. V. Sindhu (Semi-finals)
5. (Canada) Michelle Li (Second round)
6. (United States) Beiwen Zhang (Semi-finals)
7. (Chinese Taipei) Hsu Wen-chi (Quarter-finals)
8. (Japan) Nozomi Okuhara (Withdrew)

=== Finals ===
Semi-finals
1	(Japan) Akane Yamaguchi	21	21
4	(India) P. V. Sindhu	14	15
6	(United States) Beiwen Zhang
2	(Thailand) Ratchanok Intanon	w	/	o

Final
1	(Japan) Akane Yamaguchi	21	21
2	(Thailand) Ratchanok Intanon	19	16

=== Top half ===
==== Section 1 ====
First round
1	(Japan) A Yamaguchi	22	21
(Brazil) J Vieira	20	12
(Canada) W Y Zhang	23	9
(Denmark) J D Jakobsen	25	21
5	(Canada) M Li	21	21
Q2	(Republic of Ireland) R Darragh	9	8
PFQ	(Hungary) V Sándorházi	13	19
(Vietnam) Nguyễn T L	21	21

Second round
1	(Japan) A Yamaguchi	15	21	21
(Denmark) J D Jakobsen	21	17	16
5	(Canada) M Li	11	17
(Vietnam) Nguyễn T L	21	21

Quarter-finals
1	(Japan) A Yamaguchi	21	21
(Vietnam) Nguyễn T L	14	13

==== Section 2 ====
First round
4	(India) P. V. Sindhu	21	21
(Canada) T Ng	16	9
(Japan) N Nidaira	21	21
PFQ	(Canada) R Chan	19	13
PFQ	(Switzerland) J Stadelmann	21	21
Q1	(Czech Republic) T Švábíková	18	18
(Denmark) L Christophersen	21	13	14
(China) Gao FJ	19	21	21

Second round
4	(India) P. V. Sindhu	w	/	o
(Japan) N Nidaira
PFQ	(Switzerland) J Stadelmann	14	20
(China) Gao FJ	21	22

Quarter-finals
4	(India) P. V. Sindhu	21	21
(China) Gao FJ	13	7

=== Bottom half ===
==== Section 3 ====
First round
(Chinese Taipei) Lin H-t	22	17	21
PFQ	(Ukraine) P Buhrova	20	21	15
(Estonia) K Kuuba	11	12
6	(United States) BW Zhang	21	21
(Chinese Taipei) Sung S-y	15	21	21
(Belgium) L Tan	21	14	12
(Japan) S Kawakami	11
3	(Thailand) B Ongbamrungphan	5^{r}

Second round
(Chinese Taipei) Lin H-t	15	19
6	(United States) BW Zhang	21	21
(Chinese Taipei) Sung S-y	21	21
(Japan) S Kawakami	12	18

Quarter-finals
6	(United States) BW Zhang	21	24
(Chinese Taipei) Sung S-y	12	22

==== Section 4 ====
First round
Q3	(Canada) E Zhang	21	26
(France) L Huet	19	24
PFQ	(Denmark) A Schulz	5	12
7	(Chinese Taipei) Hsu W-c	21	21
(Thailand) S Katethong	21	21
(India) Gadde R S	12	3
Q4	(Israel) K Polikarpova	13	8
2	(Thailand) R Intanon	21	21

Second round
Q3	(Canada) E Zhang	12	7
7	(Chinese Taipei) Hsu W-c	21	21
(Thailand) S Katethong	15	15
2	(Thailand) R Intanon	21	21

Quarter-finals
7	(Chinese Taipei) Hsu W-c	13	10
2	(Thailand) R Intanon	21	21

== Men's doubles ==
=== Seeds ===
1. (Japan) Takuro Hoki / Yugo Kobayashi (Quarter-finals)
2. (Indonesia) Mohammad Ahsan / Hendra Setiawan (Quarter-finals)
3. (Denmark) Kim Astrup / Anders Skaarup Rasmussen (Champions)
4. (Chinese Taipei) Lu Ching-yao / Yang Po-han (Second round)
5. (Chinese Taipei) Lee Yang / Wang Chi-lin (Semi-finals)
6. (Chinese Taipei) Lee Jhe-huei / Yang Po-hsuan (Second round)
7. (Japan) Akira Koga / Taichi Saito (Semi-finals)
8. (Japan) Ayato Endo / Yuta Takei (First round)

=== Finals ===
Semi-finals
7	(Japan) Akira Koga (Japan) Taichi Saito	17	21	19
(Denmark) Rasmus Kjær (Denmark) Frederik Søgaard	21	14	21
3	(Denmark) Kim Astrup (Denmark) Anders Skaarup Rasmussen	21	21
5	(Chinese Taipei) Lee Yang (Chinese Taipei) Wang Chi-lin	15	14

Final
(Denmark) Rasmus Kjær (Denmark) Frederik Søgaard	25	16	12
3	(Denmark) Kim Astrup (Denmark) Anders Skaarup Rasmussen	23	21	21

=== Top half ===
==== Section 1 ====
First round
1	(Japan) T Hoki (Japan) Y Kobayashi	21	21
(China) Chen BY (China) Liu Y	14	13
(Republic of Ireland) J Magee (Republic of Ireland) P Reynolds	12	21	9
(Chinese Taipei) Lee F-c (Chinese Taipei) Lee F-j	21	16	21
7	(Japan) A Koga (Japan) T Saito	w	/	o
(Norway) T Flåtten (Norway) V Rikheim
(France) L Corvée (France) R Labar	w	/	o
Q1

Second round
1	(Japan) T Hoki (Japan) Y Kobayashi	21	21
(Chinese Taipei) Lee F-c (Chinese Taipei) Lee F-j	19	11
7	(Japan) A Koga (Japan) T Saito	21	21	21
(France) L Corvée (France) R Labar	23	12	16

Quarter-finals
1	(Japan) T Hoki (Japan) Y Kobayashi	20	18
7	(Japan) A Koga (Japan) T Saito	22	21

==== Section 2 ====
First round
4	(Chinese Taipei) Lu C-y (Chinese Taipei) Yang P-h	21	21
Q2	(Canada) Chung L Y (Canada) J Yang	14	9
(Chinese Taipei) Lin Y-c (Chinese Taipei) Su L-w	9	15
(Denmark) R Kjær (Denmark) F Søgaard	21	21
8	(Japan) A Endo (Japan) Y Takei	12	21	16
(Chinese Taipei) Chang K-c (Chinese Taipei) Po L-w	21	19	21
Q4	(Brazil) F Farias (Brazil) D Silva	17	13
(Chinese Taipei) Chiu h-c (Chinese Taipei) Yang M-t	21	21

Second round
4	(Chinese Taipei) Lu C-y (Chinese Taipei) Yang P-h	17	9
(Denmark) R Kjær (Denmark) F Søgaard	21	21
(Chinese Taipei) Chang K-c (Chinese Taipei) Po L-w	17	19
(Chinese Taipei) Chiu h-c (Chinese Taipei) Yang M-t	21	21

Quarter-finals
(Denmark) R Kjær (Denmark) F Søgaard	21	21
(Chinese Taipei) Chiu h-c (Chinese Taipei) Yang M-t	14	10

=== Bottom half ===
==== Section 3 ====
First round
(Japan) K Matsui (Japan) Y Takeuchi	21	21
(Canada) A Dong (Canada) N Yakura	17	16
(Scotland) C Grimley (Scotland) M Grimley	18	19
6	(Chinese Taipei) Lee J-h (Chinese Taipei) Yang P-hs	21	21
(Chinese Taipei) Su C-h (Chinese Taipei) Ye H-w	21	23	21
(Canada) K Lee (Canada) T A Lindeman	19	25	11
(Germany) B Geiss (Germany) J C Völker	7	9
3	(Denmark) K Astrup (Denmark) A S Rasmussen	21	21

Second round
(Japan) K Matsui (Japan) Y Takeuchi	14	21	21
6	(Chinese Taipei) Lee J-h (Chinese Taipei) Yang P-hs	21	14	18
(Chinese Taipei) Su C-h (Chinese Taipei) Ye H-w	16	14
3	(Denmark) K Astrup (Denmark) A S Rasmussen	21	21

Quarter-finals
(Japan) K Matsui (Japan) Y Takeuchi	13	10
3	(Denmark) K Astrup (Denmark) A S Rasmussen	21	21

==== Section 4 ====
First round
(United States) V Chiu (United States) J Yuan	21	21
(England) R Easton (England) Z Russ	14	12
PFQ	(Canada) L W Lok (Canada) L Pong	18	19
5	(Chinese Taipei) Lee Y (Chinese Taipei) Wang C-l	21	21
PFQ	(Chinese Taipei) Chen Z-r (Chinese Taipei) Lu C	14	16
(India) K P Garaga (India) V G Panjala	21	21
Q3	(United States) Chen Z-y (United States) P Smith	14	13
2	(Indonesia) M Ahsan (Indonesia) H Setiawan	21	21

Second round
(United States) V Chiu (United States) J Yuan	13	16
5	(Chinese Taipei) Lee Y (Chinese Taipei) Wang C-l	21	21
(India) K P Garaga (India) V G Panjala	9	11
2	(Indonesia) M Ahsan (Indonesia) H Setiawan	21	21

Quarter-finals
5	(Chinese Taipei) Lee Y (Chinese Taipei) Wang C-l	21	21
2	(Indonesia) M Ahsan (Indonesia) H Setiawan	17	13

== Women's doubles ==
=== Seeds ===
1. (Japan) Nami Matsuyama / Chiharu Shida (Champions)
2. (Thailand) Jongkolphan Kititharakul / Rawinda Prajongjai (Semi-finals)
3. (Japan) Yuki Fukushima / Sayaka Hirota (Semi-finals)
4. (Japan) Mayu Matsumoto / Wakana Nagahara (Final)
5. (Thailand) Benyapa Aimsaard / Nuntakarn Aimsaard (Quarter-finals)
6. (Japan) Rena Miyaura / Ayako Sakuramoto (Quarter-finals)
7. (Denmark) Maiken Fruergaard / Sara Thygesen (Second round)
8. (Japan) Rui Hirokami / Yuna Kato (First round)

=== Finals ===
Semi-finals
1	(Japan) Nami Matsuyama (Japan) Chiharu Shida	13	21	27
3	(Japan) Yuki Fukushima (Japan) Sayaka Hirota	21	15	25
4	(Japan) Mayu Matsumoto (Japan) Wakana Nagahara	21	21
2	(Thailand) Jongkolphan Kititharakul (Thailand) Rawinda Prajongjai	16	18

Final
1	(Japan) Nami Matsuyama (Japan) Chiharu Shida	22	21
4	(Japan) Mayu Matsumoto (Japan) Wakana Nagahara	20	16

=== Top half ===
==== Section 1 ====
First round
(India) R Panda (India) S Panda	21	15	9
(Canada) J Cheung (Canada) J Chow	15	21	21
5	(Thailand) B Aimsaard (Thailand) N Aimsaard	21	21
(Chinese Taipei) Hsu Y-h (Chinese Taipei) Lee C-c	18	13
(Japan) R Iwanaga (Japan) K Nakanishi	21	21
(Canada) J Xu (Canada) A Yu	8	10

Second round
1	(Japan) N Matsuyama (Japan) C Shida	21	21
(Canada) J Cheung (Canada) J Chow	3	9
5	(Thailand) B Aimsaard (Thailand) N Aimsaard	21	21
(Japan) R Iwanaga (Japan) K Nakanishi	18	14

Quarter-finals
1	(Japan) N Matsuyama (Japan) C Shida	21	17	21
5	(Thailand) B Aimsaard (Thailand) N Aimsaard	12	21	15

==== Section 2 ====
First round
3	(Japan) Y Fukushima (Japan) S Hirota	21	21
(China) Keng SL (China) Zhang C	15	10
(Canada) T Ng (Canada) W Y Zhang	18	21	19
(Brazil) S Lima (Brazil) J Vieira	21	13	21
6	(Japan) R Miyaura (Japan) A Sakuramoto	21	21
(United States) A Xu (United States) K Xu	10	6
(Canada) J Dent (Canada) C Lai	23	16	16
(Canada) C Choi (Canada) J Wu	21	21	21

Second round
3	(Japan) Y Fukushima (Japan) S Hirota	21	21
(Brazil) S Lima (Brazil) J Vieira	11	9
6	(Japan) R Miyaura (Japan) A Sakuramoto	26	21
(Canada) C Choi (Canada) J Wu	24	12

Quarter-finals
3	(Japan) Y Fukushima (Japan) S Hirota	21	12	21
6	(Japan) R Miyaura (Japan) A Sakuramoto	16	21	15

=== Bottom half ===
==== Section 3 ====
First round
(Australia) S Mapasa (Australia) A Yu	15	17
(China) Liu SS (China) Tan N	21	21
(Chinese Taipei) Chang C-h (Chinese Taipei) Yang C-t	16	21
7	(Denmark) M Fruergaard (Denmark) S Thygesen	21	23
(United States) F Corbett (United States) A Lee	w	/	o
(Brazil) J Lima (Brazil) S Lima
(France) M Lambert (France) A Tran	17	7
4	(Japan) M Matsumoto (Japan) W Nagahara	21	21

Second round
(China) Liu SS (China) Tan N	21	21
7	(Denmark) M Fruergaard (Denmark) S Thygesen	15	12
(United States) F Corbett (United States) A Lee	11	10
4	(Japan) M Matsumoto (Japan) W Nagahara	21	21

Quarter-finals
(China) Liu SS (China) Tan N	18	20
4	(Japan) M Matsumoto (Japan) W Nagahara	21	22

==== Section 4 ====
First round
(Chinese Taipei) Lee C-h (Chinese Taipei) Teng C-h	13	21	11
(China) Li YJ (China) Luo XM	21	17	21
(Chinese Taipei) Hsu Y-c (Chinese Taipei) Lin W-c	21	21
8	(Japan) R Hirokami (Japan) Y Kato	14	16
(Australia) K Ea (Australia) G Somerville	w	/	o
(India) T Crasto (India) A Ponnappa
(Germany) S Küspert (Germany) E Moszczynski	8	12
2	(Thailand) J Kititharakul (Thailand) R Prajongjai	21	21

Second round
(China) Li YJ (China) Luo XM	27	21	21
(Chinese Taipei) Hsu Y-c (Chinese Taipei) Lin W-c	29	8	15
(Australia) K Ea (Australia) G Somerville	15	17
2	(Thailand) J Kititharakul (Thailand) R Prajongjai	21	21

Quarter-finals
(China) Li YJ (China) Luo XM	14	19
2	(Thailand) J Kititharakul (Thailand) R Prajongjai	21	21

== Mixed doubles ==
=== Seeds ===
1. (Japan) Yuta Watanabe / Arisa Higashino (Quarter-finals)
2. (Japan) Kyohei Yamashita / Naru Shinoya (Semi-finals)
3. (Japan) Yuki Kaneko / Misaki Matsutomo (Quarter-finals)
4. (Chinese Taipei) Ye Hong-wei / Lee Chia-hsin (Second round)
5. (Japan) Hiroki Midorikawa / Natsu Saito (Champions)
6. (Chinese Taipei) Chang Ko-chi / Lee Chih-chen (First round)
7. (Denmark) Mathias Thyrri / Amalie Magelund (Final)
8. (England) Gregory Mairs / Jenny Moore (Withdrew)

=== Finals ===
Semi-finals
(Chinese Taipei) Lee Jhe-huei (Chinese Taipei) Hsu Ya-ching	11	19
7	(Denmark) Mathias Thyrri (Denmark) Amalie Magelund	21	21
5	(Japan) Hiroki Midorikawa (Japan) Natsu Saito	21	21
2	(Japan) Kyohei Yamashita (Japan) Naru Shinoya	19	12

Final
7	(Denmark) Mathias Thyrri (Denmark) Amalie Magelund	17	21	13
5	(Japan) Hiroki Midorikawa (Japan) Natsu Saito	21	16	21

=== Top half ===
==== Section 1 ====
First round
1	(Japan) Y Watanabe (Japan) A Higashino	21	21
(Canada) T A Lindeman (Canada) J Wu	16	13
(Germany) J C Völker (Germany) S Küspert	21	21
PFQ	(Canada) Lam W L (Canada) J Chow	18	16
PFQ	(Australia) J Yu (Australia) S Mapasa	18	13
(Chinese Taipei) Lee J-h (Chinese Taipei) Hsu Y-c	21	21
(Brazil) D Silva (Brazil) S Lima	21	21
(Israel) M Zilberman (Israel) S Zilberman	17	9

Second round
1	(Japan) Y Watanabe (Japan) A Higashino	21	21
(Germany) J C Völker (Germany) S Küspert	14	10
(Chinese Taipei) Lee J-h (Chinese Taipei) Hsu Y-c	20	21	21
(Brazil) D Silva (Brazil) S Lima	22	16	18

Quarter-finals
1	(Japan) Y Watanabe (Japan) A Higashino	18	24
(Chinese Taipei) Lee J-h (Chinese Taipei) Hsu Y-c	21	26

==== Section 2 ====
First round
3	(Japan) Y Kaneko (Japan) M Matsutomo	w	/	o
(India) B. S Reddy (India) A Ponnappa
(Algeria) K Mammeri (Algeria) T Mammeri
(Denmark) M Mikkelsen (Denmark) R Søby Hansen	w	/	o
7	(Denmark) M Thyrri (Denmark) A Magelund	w	/	o
Q2
(United States) R Zheng (Canada) J Cheung	w	/	o
Q1

Second round
3	(Japan) Y Kaneko (Japan) M Matsutomo	21	21
(Denmark) M Mikkelsen (Denmark) R Søby Hansen	18	16
7	(Denmark) M Thyrri (Denmark) A Magelund	21	21
(United States) R Zheng (Canada) J Cheung	8	6

Quarter-finals
3	(Japan) Y Kaneko (Japan) M Matsutomo	18	21	19
7	(Denmark) M Thyrri (Denmark) A Magelund	21	17	21

=== Bottom half ===
==== Section 3 ====
First round
(United States) V Chiu (United States) J Gai	21	21
(Canada) K Lee (Canada) E Zhang	17	14
(Germany) P Scheiel (Germany) F Volkmann	13	16
5	(Japan) H Midorikawa (Japan) N Saito	21	21
PFQ	(Chinese Taipei) Lee F-j (Chinese Taipei) Hsu Y-h	21	11
PFQ	(Chinese Taipei) Po L-w (Chinese Taipei) Chang C-h	12	4^{r}
(Australia) K Choo (Australia) G Somerville	16	18
4	(Chinese Taipei) Ye H-w (Chinese Taipei) Lee C-h	21	21

Second round
(United States) V Chiu (United States) J Gai	21	15	13
5	(Japan) H Midorikawa (Japan) N Saito	18	21	21
PFQ	(Chinese Taipei) Lee F-j (Chinese Taipei) Hsu Y-h	9	21	21
4	(Chinese Taipei) Ye H-w (Chinese Taipei) Lee C-h	21	19	18

Quarter-finals
5	(Japan) H Midorikawa (Japan) N Saito	21	21
PFQ	(Chinese Taipei) Lee F-j (Chinese Taipei) Hsu Y-h	12	13

==== Section 4 ====
First round
(Chinese Taipei) Yang P-hs (Chinese Taipei) Hu L-f	21	21
(Canada) N Yakura (Canada) C Lai	9	9
(China) Cheng X (China) Chen FH	22	18	21
6	(Chinese Taipei) Chang K-c (Chinese Taipei) Lee C-c	20	21	17
Q3	d	n	s
Q4	d	n	s
PFQ	(Chinese Taipei) Chen Z-r (Chinese Taipei) Yang C-t	16	15
2	(Japan) K Yamashita (Japan) N Shinoya	21	21

Second round
(Chinese Taipei) Yang P-hs (Chinese Taipei) Hu L-f	21	16	12
(China) Cheng X (China) Chen FH	15	21	21
2	(Japan) K Yamashita (Japan) N Shinoya	w	/	o

Quarter-finals
(China) Cheng X (China) Chen FH	12	19
2	(Japan) K Yamashita (Japan) N Shinoya	21	21

Preceded by 2022 Canada Open	Canada Open	Succeeded by 2024 Canada Open
Preceded by 2023 Taipei Open	BWF World Tour; 2023 BWF season	Succeeded by 2023 U.S. Open
