= 2025 Badminton Asia Championships =

Badminton tournament in China

Tournament details
- Dates: 8–13 April
- Edition: 42nd
- Total prize money: US$500,000
- Venue: Ningbo Olympic Sports Center Gymnasium
- Location: Ningbo, China

Champions
- Men's singles: (Thailand) Kunlavut Vitidsarn
- Women's singles: (China) Chen Yufei
- Men's doubles: (Malaysia) Aaron Chia (Malaysia) Soh Wooi Yik
- Women's doubles: (China) Liu Shengshu (China) Tan Ning
- Mixed doubles: (Hong Kong) Tang Chun Man (Hong Kong) Tse Ying Suet

The 2025 Badminton Asia Championships (officially known as the Bank of Ningbo Badminton Asia Championships 2025 for sponsorship reasons) was a badminton tournament that took place at the Ningbo Olympic Sports Center Gymnasium, Ningbo, China, from 8 to 13 April 2025 and had a total prize of US$500,000.

== Tournament ==
The 2025 Badminton Asia Championships was the 42nd edition of the Badminton Asia Championships. This tournament was organized by Badminton Asia and hosted by the Chinese Badminton Association.

=== Venue ===
This tournament was held at the Ningbo Olympic Sports Center Gymnasium in Ningbo, Zhejiang, China.

=== Point distribution ===
Below is the point distribution table for each phase of the tournament based on the BWF points system for the Badminton Asia Championships, which is equivalent to a BWF World Tour Super 1000.

Winner	Runner-up	3/4	5/8	9/16	17/32	33/64
12,000	10,200	8,400	6,600	4,800	3,000	1,200

=== Prize pool ===
The total prize money was US$500,000 with the distribution of the prize money in accordance with BWF regulations.

Event	Winner	Finalist	Semi-finals	Quarter-finals	Last 16	Last 32
Singles	$35,000	$17,000	$7,000	$2,750	$1,500	$500
Doubles	$37,000	$17,500	$7,000	$3,125	$1,625	$500

== Medal summary ==
=== Medalists ===
Event	Gold	Silver	Bronze
Men's singles	(Thailand) Kunlavut Vitidsarn	(China) Lu Guangzu	(Singapore) Loh Kean Yew
Men's singles	(Thailand) Kunlavut Vitidsarn	(China) Lu Guangzu	(China) Li Shifeng
Women's singles	(China) Chen Yufei	(China) Han Yue	(South Korea) Sim Yu-jin
Women's singles	(China) Chen Yufei	(China) Han Yue	(China) Gao Fangjie
Men's doubles	(Malaysia) Aaron Chia (Malaysia) Soh Wooi Yik	(China) Chen Boyang (China) Liu Yi	(Indonesia) Leo Rolly Carnando (Indonesia) Bagas Maulana
Men's doubles	(Malaysia) Aaron Chia (Malaysia) Soh Wooi Yik	(China) Chen Boyang (China) Liu Yi	(China) Liang Weikeng (China) Wang Chang
Women's doubles	(China) Liu Shengshu (China) Tan Ning	(Japan) Nami Matsuyama (Japan) Chiharu Shida	(China) Zhang Shuxian (China) Zheng Yu
Women's doubles	(China) Liu Shengshu (China) Tan Ning	(Japan) Nami Matsuyama (Japan) Chiharu Shida	(China) Chen Qingchen (China) Jia Yifan
Mixed doubles	(Hong Kong) Tang Chun Man (Hong Kong) Tse Ying Suet	(Japan) Hiroki Midorikawa (Japan) Natsu Saito	(China) Jiang Zhenbang (China) Wei Yaxin
Mixed doubles	(Hong Kong) Tang Chun Man (Hong Kong) Tse Ying Suet	(Japan) Hiroki Midorikawa (Japan) Natsu Saito	(Indonesia) Jafar Hidayatullah (Indonesia) Felisha Pasaribu

=== Medal table ===
* Host nation (China)

Rank	Nation	Gold	Silver	Bronze	Total
1	China*	2	3	6	11
2	Hong Kong	1	0	0	1
2	Malaysia	1	0	0	1
2	Thailand	1	0	0	1
5	Japan	0	2	0	2
6	Indonesia	0	0	2	2
7	Singapore	0	0	1	1
7	South Korea	0	0	1	1
Totals (8 entries)		5	5	10	20

== Qualification ==
=== Final standings ===
Group	Men's singles	Women's singles	Men's doubles	Women's doubles	Mixed doubles
A	(Malaysia) Justin Hoh	(Malaysia) Wong Ling Ching	(Macau) Pui Chi Chon (Macau) Pui Pang Fong	(Sri Lanka) Isuri Attanayake (Sri Lanka) Sithumi De Silva	(Japan) Hiroki Nishi (Japan) Akari Sato
B	(Sri Lanka) Viren Nettasinghe	(Sri Lanka) Ranithma Liyanage	(Sri Lanka) Madhuka Dulanjana (Sri Lanka) Lahiru Weerasinghe	(Hong Kong) Fu Chi Yan (Hong Kong) Leung Sze Lok	(Philippines) Julius Villabrille (Philippines) Airah Albo
C	(Macau) Pui Pang Fong	(Hong Kong) Saloni Samirbhai Mehta	(Bangladesh) Jumar Al-Amin (Bangladesh) Moajjam Hossain Ohidul	(Singapore) Heng Xiao En (Singapore) Jin Yujia	(Sri Lanka) Thulith Palliyaguru (Sri Lanka) Panchali Adhikari
D	(Kazakhstan) Dmitriy Panarin	(Chinese Taipei) Huang Yu-hsun	(Hong Kong) Hung Kuei Chun (Hong Kong) Lui Chun Wai	(Vietnam) Phạm Thị Dieu Ly (Vietnam) Phạm Thị Khánh	(Macau) Leong Iok Chong (Macau) Ng Weng Chi

== Men's singles ==
=== Seeds ===
1. (China) Shi Yuqi (quarter-finals)
2. (Indonesia) Jonatan Christie (quarter-finals)
3. (Thailand) Kunlavut Vitidsarn (champion)
4. (China) Li Shifeng (semi-finals)
5. (Japan) Kodai Naraoka (quarter-finals)
6. (Chinese Taipei) Chou Tien-chen (first round)
7. (Chinese Taipei) Lin Chun-yi (second round)
8. (Singapore) Loh Kean Yew (semi-finals)

=== Finals ===
Semi-finals
8	(Singapore) Loh Kean Yew	21	10
3	(Thailand) Kunlavut Vitidsarn	23	21
4	(China) Li Shifeng	21	10	14
(China) Lu Guangzu	19	21	21

Final
3	(Thailand) Kunlavut Vitidsarn	21	11
(China) Lu Guangzu	12	6^{r}

=== Top half ===
==== Section 1 ====
First round
1	(China) Shi YQ	21	21
C1	(Macau) Pui P F	15	10
(Hong Kong) Ng K L	19	21	10
(Japan) Y Tanaka	21	12	21
8	(Singapore) Loh K Y	21	22
(Indonesia) C A Dwi Wardoyo	12	20
(India) L Sen	18	10
(Chinese Taipei) Lee C-h	21	21

Second round
1	(China) Shi YQ	21	21
(Japan) Y Tanaka	16	12
8	(Singapore) Loh K Y	21	21
(Chinese Taipei) Lee C-h	15	17

Quarter-finals
1	(China) Shi YQ	19	21	16
8	(Singapore) Loh K Y	21	13	21

==== Section 2 ====
First round
3	(Thailand) K Vitidsarn	21	21
(Malaysia) Ng T Y	9	12
D1	(Kazakhstan) D Panarin	16	8
(India) K George	21	21
6	(Chinese Taipei) Chou T-c	17	17
(Japan) K Nishimoto	21	21
(Indonesia) A Farhan	21	21
(China) Weng HY	9	14

Second round
3	(Thailand) K Vitidsarn	19	21	21
(India) K George	21	13	16
(Japan) K Nishimoto	21	21
(Indonesia) A Farhan	14	16

Quarter-finals
3	(Thailand) K Vitidsarn	21	13	23
(Japan) K Nishimoto	12	21	21

=== Bottom half ===
==== Section 3 ====
First round
(Thailand) K Wangcharoen	22	12	10
(India) P Rajawat	20	21	21
(Hong Kong) Lee C Y	9	11
5	(Japan) K Naraoka	21	21
(Singapore) J Teh	14	19
(Chinese Taipei) Chi Y-j	21	21
B1	(Sri Lanka) V Nettasinghe	19	19
4	(China) Li SF	21	21

Second round
(India) P Rajawat	14	17
5	(Japan) K Naraoka	21	21
(Chinese Taipei) Chi Y-j	16	19
4	(China) Li SF	21	21

Quarter-finals
5	(Japan) K Naraoka	21	10
4	(China) Li SF	23	21

==== Section 4 ====
First round
(China) Lu GZ	21	12	21
(India) Prannoy H. S.	16	21	11
(Malaysia) Leong J H	11	19
7	(Chinese Taipei) Lin C-y	21	21
A1	(Malaysia) J Hoh	14	22	21
(South Korea) Jeon H-j	21	20	16
(Japan) K Watanabe	21	12	18
2	(Indonesia) J Christie	16	21	21

Second round
(China) Lu GZ	16	21	21
7	(Chinese Taipei) Lin C-y	21	15	11
A1	(Malaysia) J Hoh	13	19
2	(Indonesia) J Christie	21	21

Quarter-finals
(China) Lu GZ	21	21
2	(Indonesia) J Christie	13	13

== Women's singles ==
=== Seeds ===
1. (China) Wang Zhiyi (second round)
2. (China) Han Yue (final)
3. (Japan) Akane Yamaguchi (quarter-finals)
4. (Indonesia) Gregoria Mariska Tunjung (second round)
5. (Thailand) Pornpawee Chochuwong (withdrew)
6. (Japan) Tomoka Miyazaki (second round)
7. (Thailand) Supanida Katethong (quarter-finals)
8. (Thailand) Ratchanok Intanon (second round)

=== Finals ===
Semi-finals
(South Korea) Sim Yu-jin	11	11
(China) Chen Yufei	21	21
(China) Gao Fangjie	14	16
2	(China) Han Yue	21	21

Final
(China) Chen Yufei	11	21	21
2	(China) Han Yue	21	14	9

=== Top half ===
==== Section 1 ====
First round
1	(China) Wang ZY	20	21	21
(Indonesia) P K Wardani	22	16	12
(Chinese Taipei) Chiu P-c	17	22
(South Korea) Sim Y-j	21	24
8	(Thailand) R Intanon	21	21
(India) A Upadhyaya	13	14
B1	(Sri Lanka) R Liyanage	16	7
(Japan) N Nidaira	21	21

Second round
1	(China) Wang ZY	13	21	13
(South Korea) Sim Y-j	21	10	21
8	(Thailand) R Intanon	17	12
(Japan) N Nidaira	21	21

Quarter-finals
(South Korea) Sim Y-j	21	21
(Japan) N Nidaira	8	16

==== Section 2 ====
First round
3	(Japan) A Yamaguchi	21	21
(Vietnam) Nguyễn T L	18	17
(Indonesia) E N T Wardoyo	15	19
(India) P. V. Sindhu	21	21
SWM	(Thailand) B Ongbamrungphan	21	21
C1	(Hong Kong) S S Mehta	12	11
(Chinese Taipei) Lin H-t	15	16
(China) Chen YF	21	21

Second round
3	(Japan) A Yamaguchi	21	16	21
(India) P. V. Sindhu	11	21	16
SWM	(Thailand) B Ongbamrungphan	16	17
(China) Chen YF	21	21

Quarter-finals
3	(Japan) A Yamaguchi	19	13
(China) Chen YF	21	21

=== Bottom half ===
==== Section 3 ====
First round
(India) M Bansod	14	8
(China) Gao FJ	21	21
PFQ	(Malaysia) Letshanaa K	15	11
6	(Japan) T Miyazaki	21	21
(Singapore) Yeo J M
(South Korea) Kim G-e	w	/	o
D1	(Chinese Taipei) Huang Y-h	12	16
4	(Indonesia) G M Tunjung	21	21

Second round
(China) Gao FJ	21	14	21
6	(Japan) T Miyazaki	17	21	16
(South Korea) Kim G-e	21	18	21
4	(Indonesia) G M Tunjung	17	21	12

Quarter-finals
(China) Gao FJ	21	21
(South Korea) Kim G-e	17	16

==== Section 4 ====
First round
(Malaysia) Goh J W	21	21
(Chinese Taipei) Sung S-y	16	13
PFQ	(Hong Kong) Lo S Y	14	16
7	(Thailand) S Katethong	21	21
(Indonesia) K A C Dewi	21	16	21
A1	(Malaysia) Wong L C	17	21	17
(India) A Kashyap	13	7
2	(China) Han Y	21	21

Second round
(Malaysia) Goh J W	15	16
7	(Thailand) S Katethong	21	21
(Indonesia) K A C Dewi	14	11
2	(China) Han Y	21	21

Quarter-finals
7	(Thailand) S Katethong	13	9
2	(China) Han Y	21	21

== Men's doubles ==
=== Seeds ===
1. (Malaysia) Goh Sze Fei / Nur Izzuddin (quarter-finals)
2. (China) Liang Weikeng / Wang Chang (semi-finals)
3. (Indonesia) Fajar Alfian / Muhammad Rian Ardianto (quarter-finals)
4. (China) He Jiting / Ren Xiangyu (withdrew)
5. (South Korea) Kim Won-ho / Seo Seung-jae (second round)
6. (Malaysia) Aaron Chia / Soh Wooi Yik (champions)
7. (Indonesia) Sabar Karyaman Gutama / Muhammad Reza Pahlevi Isfahani (first round)
8. (Malaysia) Man Wei Chong / Tee Kai Wun (second round)

=== Finals ===
Semi-finals
(China) Chen Boyang (China) Liu Yi	13	21	21
(Indonesia) Leo Rolly Carnando (Indonesia) Bagas Maulana	21	18	12
6	(Malaysia) Aaron Chia (Malaysia) Soh Wooi Yik	21	21
2	(China) Liang Weikeng (China) Wang Chang	12	14

Final
(China) Chen Boyang (China) Liu Yi	19	17
6	(Malaysia) Aaron Chia (Malaysia) Soh Wooi Yik	21	21

=== Top half ===
==== Section 1 ====
First round
1	(Malaysia) Goh S F (Malaysia) N Izzuddin	21	21
(Japan) T Hoki (Japan) Y Kobayashi	18	16
(Thailand) K Kedren (Thailand) D Puavaranukroh	21	21
C1	(Bangladesh) J Al-Amin (Bangladesh) M H Ohidul	12	13
7	(Indonesia) S K Gutama (Indonesia) M R P Isfahani	21	12	19
(China) Chen BY (China) Liu Y	11	21	21
(Chinese Taipei) Chiu H-c (Chinese Taipei) Wang C-l	21	21
(India) P Roy (India) Sai P K	19	12

Second round
1	(Malaysia) Goh S F (Malaysia) N Izzuddin	21	22
(Thailand) K Kedren (Thailand) D Puavaranukroh	18	20
(China) Chen BY (China) Liu Y	21	22
(Chinese Taipei) Chiu H-c (Chinese Taipei) Wang C-l	17	20

Quarter-finals
1	(Malaysia) Goh S F (Malaysia) N Izzuddin	16	21	20
(China) Chen BY (China) Liu Y	21	18	22

==== Section 2 ====
First round
8	(Malaysia) Man W C (Malaysia) Tee K W	21	21
(Hong Kong) Law C H (Hong Kong) Yeung S C	14	12
D1	(Hong Kong) Hung K C (Hong Kong) Lui C W	21	16	12
(Chinese Taipei) Liu K-h (Chinese Taipei) Yang P-ha	19	21	21
SWM	(Chinese Taipei) Lee J-h (Chinese Taipei) Yang P-hs	21	21
(United Arab Emirates) De Ayyappan (United Arab Emirates) Dh Ayyappan	15	10
(Indonesia) L R Carnando (Indonesia) B Maulana	22	21
(Japan) T Nomura (Japan) Y Shimogami	20	17

Second round
8	(Malaysia) Man W C (Malaysia) Tee K W	12	21	18
(Chinese Taipei) Liu K-h (Chinese Taipei) Yang P-ha	21	16	21
SWM	(Chinese Taipei) Lee J-h (Chinese Taipei) Yang P-hs	11	21	11
(Indonesia) L R Carnando (Indonesia) B Maulana	21	19	21

Quarter-finals
(Chinese Taipei) Liu K-h (Chinese Taipei) Yang P-ha	16	17
(Indonesia) L R Carnando (Indonesia) B Maulana	21	21

=== Bottom half ===
==== Section 3 ====
First round
(India) H Amsakarunan (India) R Kumar	21	21
B1	(Sri Lanka) M Dulanjana (Sri Lanka) L Weerasinghe	3	12
(Japan) K Mitsuhashi (Japan) H Okamura	18	15
6	(Malaysia) A Chia (Malaysia) Soh W Y	21	21
PFQ	(Japan) K Shibata (Japan) N Yamada	21	17	16
(Thailand) C Charoenkitamorn (Thailand) W Thongsa-nga	18	21	21
(China) Xie HN (China) Zeng WH	19	15
3	(Indonesia) F Alfian (Indonesia) M R Ardianto	21	21

Second round
(India) H Amsakarunan (India) R Kumar	15	14
6	(Malaysia) A Chia (Malaysia) Soh W Y	21	21
(Thailand) C Charoenkitamorn (Thailand) W Thongsa-nga	19	21
3	(Indonesia) F Alfian (Indonesia) M R Ardianto	21	23

Quarter-finals
6	(Malaysia) A Chia (Malaysia) Soh W Y	21	21
3	(Indonesia) F Alfian (Indonesia) M R Ardianto	16	11

==== Section 4 ====
First round
A1	(Macau) Pui C C (Macau) Pui P F	15	8
(Indonesia) M S Fikri (Indonesia) D Marthin	21	21
PFQ	(Thailand) P Thongkham (Thailand) W Thongkham	10	16
5	(South Korea) Kim W-h (South Korea) Seo S-j	21	21
(Malaysia) J Arif (Malaysia) Yap R K	21	21
(Singapore) W Koh (Singapore) J Kubo	17	19
(Chinese Taipei) Lee F-c (Chinese Taipei) Lee F-j	12	9
2	(China) Liang WK (China) Wang C	21	21

Second round
(Indonesia) M S Fikri (Indonesia) D Marthin	18	21	21
5	(South Korea) Kim W-h (South Korea) Seo S-j	21	17	15
(Malaysia) J Arif (Malaysia) Yap R K	21	14	11
2	(China) Liang WK (China) Wang C	17	21	21

Quarter-finals
(Indonesia) M S Fikri (Indonesia) D Marthin	19	19
2	(China) Liang WK (China) Wang C	21	21

== Women's doubles ==
=== Seeds ===
1. (China) Liu Shengshu / Tan Ning (champions)
2. (South Korea) Baek Ha-na / Lee So-hee (withdrew)
3. (Japan) Nami Matsuyama / Chiharu Shida (final)
4. (Japan) Rin Iwanaga / Kie Nakanishi (quarter-finals)
5. (China) Chen Qingchen / Jia Yifan (semi-finals)
6. (Malaysia) Pearly Tan / Thinaah Muralitharan (first round)
7. (China) Li Yijing / Luo Xumin (quarter-finals)
8. (Japan) Yuki Fukushima / Mayu Matsumoto (second round)

=== Finals ===
Semi-finals
1	(China) Liu Shengshu (China) Tan Ning	21	21
(China) Zhang Shuxian (China) Zheng Yu	12	15
5	(China) Chen Qingchen (China) Jia Yifan	17	10
3	(Japan) Nami Matsuyama (Japan) Chiharu Shida	21	21

Final
1	(China) Liu Shengshu (China) Tan Ning	21	21
3	(Japan) Nami Matsuyama (Japan) Chiharu Shida	15	19

=== Top half ===
==== Section 1 ====
First round
1	(China) Liu SS (China) Tan N	21	21
(Chinese Taipei) Hsieh P-s (Chinese Taipei) Hung E-t	16	14
PFQ	(United Arab Emirates) M O Khan (United Arab Emirates) T Khan	13	6
B1	(Hong Kong) Fu C Y (Hong Kong) Leung S L	21	21
8	(Japan) Y Fukushima (Japan) M Matsumoto	21	19	21
PFQ	(Thailand) T Kleebyeesun (Thailand) N Laisuan	19	21	14
(Hong Kong) Yeung N T (Hong Kong) Yeung P L	21	18	21
(Indonesia) L T Mayasari (Indonesia) S F S Ramadhanti	17	21	16

Second round
1	(China) Liu SS (China) Tan N	21	21
B1	(Hong Kong) Fu C Y (Hong Kong) Leung S L	7	15
8	(Japan) Y Fukushima (Japan) M Matsumoto
(Hong Kong) Yeung N T (Hong Kong) Yeung P L	w	/	o

Quarter-finals
1	(China) Liu SS (China) Tan N	21	21
(Hong Kong) Yeung N T (Hong Kong) Yeung P L	11	14

==== Section 2 ====
First round
4	(Japan) R Iwanaga (Japan) K Nakanishi	21	21
D1	(Vietnam) Phạm T D L (Vietnam) Phạm T K	13	10
(Indonesia) S S Azzahra (Indonesia) A S Rahayu	21	21
(Chinese Taipei) Hsu Y-h (Chinese Taipei) Lin J-y	17	19
6	(Malaysia) P Tan (Malaysia) Thinaah M	19	26
(South Korea) Kim H-j (South Korea) Kong H-y	21	28
(Thailand) O Jongsathapornparn (Thailand) S Suwachai	9	11
(China) Zhang SX (China) Zheng Y	21	21

Second round
4	(Japan) R Iwanaga (Japan) K Nakanishi	21	21
(Indonesia) S S Azzahra (Indonesia) A S Rahayu	14	19
(South Korea) Kim H-j (South Korea) Kong H-y	15	18
(China) Zhang SX (China) Zheng Y	21	21

Quarter-finals
4	(Japan) R Iwanaga (Japan) K Nakanishi	16	12
(China) Zhang SX (China) Zheng Y	21	21

=== Bottom half ===
==== Section 3 ====
First round
PFQ	(Malaysia) Ong X Y (Malaysia) C Ting	21	19	16
(Malaysia) Go P K (Malaysia) Teoh M X	18	21	21
A1	(Sri Lanka) I Attanayake (Sri Lanka) S de Silva	5	5
5	(China) Chen QC (China) Jia YF	21	21
(Chinese Taipei) Sung S-y (Chinese Taipei) Yu C-h	21	21
(India) P Konjengbam (India) S Mishra	11	13
(Hong Kong) Lui L L (Hong Kong) Tsang H Y	22	19
7	(China) Li YJ (China) Luo XM	24	21

Second round
(Malaysia) Go P K (Malaysia) Teoh M X	5	13
5	(China) Chen QC (China) Jia YF	21	21
(Chinese Taipei) Sung S-y (Chinese Taipei) Yu C-h	18	9
7	(China) Li YJ (China) Luo XM	21	21

Quarter-finals
5	(China) Chen QC (China) Jia YF	21	21
7	(China) Li YJ (China) Luo XM	12	15

==== Section 4 ====
First round
(Chinese Taipei) Chang C-h (Chinese Taipei) Yang C-t	12	22	16
(Hong Kong) Fan K Y (Hong Kong) Yau M Y	21	20	21
(Indonesia) M T Puspita Sari (Indonesia) R A Rose	13	21	10
SWM	(Indonesia) F D Kusuma (Indonesia) A C Pratiwi	21	16	21
(Thailand) L Kanlaha (Thailand) P Muenwong	21	21
C1	(Singapore) Heng X E (Singapore) Jin YJ	15	13
(Japan) M Otake (Japan) M Takahashi	13	18
3	(Japan) N Matsuyama (Japan) C Shida	21	21

Second round
(Hong Kong) Fan K Y (Hong Kong) Yau M Y	21	6	13
SWM	(Indonesia) F D Kusuma (Indonesia) A C Pratiwi	18	21	21
(Thailand) L Kanlaha (Thailand) P Muenwong	12	13
3	(Japan) N Matsuyama (Japan) C Shida	21	21

Quarter-finals
SWM	(Indonesia) F D Kusuma (Indonesia) A C Pratiwi	16	16
3	(Japan) N Matsuyama (Japan) C Shida	21	21

== Mixed doubles ==
=== Seeds ===
1. (China) Jiang Zhenbang / Wei Yaxin (semi-finals)
2. (China) Feng Yanzhe / Huang Dongping (quarter-finals)
3. (Malaysia) Goh Soon Huat / Shevon Jemie Lai (quarter-finals)
4. (China) Guo Xinwa / Chen Fanghui (first round)
5. (Hong Kong) Tang Chun Man / Tse Ying Suet (champions)
6. (Chinese Taipei) Yang Po-hsuan / Hu Ling-fang (first round)
7. (China) Cheng Xing / Zhang Chi (first round)
8. (Japan) Hiroki Midorikawa / Natsu Saito (final)

=== Finals ===
Semi-finals
1	(China) Jiang Zhenbang (China) Wei Yaxin	16	17
5	(Hong Kong) Tang Chun Man (Hong Kong) Tse Ying Suet	21	21
(Indonesia) Jafar Hidayatullah (Indonesia) Felisha Pasaribu	21	21	11
8	(Japan) Hiroki Midorikawa (Japan) Natsu Saito	15	23	21

Final
5	(Hong Kong) Tang Chun Man (Hong Kong) Tse Ying Suet	21	17	21
8	(Japan) Hiroki Midorikawa (Japan) Natsu Saito	15	21	13

=== Top half ===
==== Section 1 ====
First round
1	(China) Jiang ZB (China) Wei YX	21	21
(Thailand) P Teeraratsakul (Thailand) P Muenwong	9	9
C1	(Sri Lanka) T Palliyaguru (Sri Lanka) P Adhikari	9	11
(India) A Surya (India) A Pramuthesh	21	21
6	(Chinese Taipei) Yang P-hs (Chinese Taipei) Hu L-f	12	18
(Indonesia) R Rivaldy (Indonesia) P H Mentari	21	21
(Malaysia) Wong T C (Malaysia) Lim C S	16	14
(Japan) Y Shimogami (Japan) S Hobara	21	21

Second round
1	(China) Jiang ZB (China) Wei YX	21	21
(India) A Surya (India) A Pramuthesh	11	14
(Indonesia) R Rivaldy (Indonesia) P H Mentari	21	21
(Japan) Y Shimogami (Japan) S Hobara	14	8

Quarter-finals
1	(China) Jiang ZB (China) Wei YX	21	21
(Indonesia) R Rivaldy (Indonesia) P H Mentari	4	15

==== Section 2 ====
First round
4	(China) Guo XW (China) Chen FH	19	21	19
(Chinese Taipei) Ye H-w (Chinese Taipei) N G Chan	21	13	21
(India) D Kapila (India) T Crasto	15	21	21
(Malaysia) Hoo P R (Malaysia) Cheng S Y	21	12	11
5	(Hong Kong) Tang C M (Hong Kong) Tse Y S	21	21
(Thailand) R Oupthong (Thailand) J Sudjaipraparat	9	15
(Indonesia) A Syahnawi (Indonesia) N V Marwah	19	23	21
A1	(Japan) H Nishi (Japan) A Sato	21	21	19

Second round
(Chinese Taipei) Ye H-w (Chinese Taipei) N G Chan	21	16	18
(India) D Kapila (India) T Crasto	12	21	21
5	(Hong Kong) Tang C M (Hong Kong) Tse Y S	21	21
(Indonesia) A Syahnawi (Indonesia) N V Marwah	15	14

Quarter-finals
(India) D Kapila (India) T Crasto	20	13
5	(Hong Kong) Tang C M (Hong Kong) Tse Y S	22	21

=== Bottom half ===
==== Section 3 ====
First round
(Hong Kong) Lui C W (Hong Kong) Fu C Y	16	22	18
(Chinese Taipei) Chen C-k (Chinese Taipei) Hsu Y-h	21	20	21
(Indonesia) J Hidayatullah (Indonesia) F Pasaribu	14	21	21
7	(China) Cheng X (China) Zhang C	21	15	19
(Thailand) D Puavaranukroh (Thailand) S Paewsampran	21	21
B1	(Philippines) J Villabrille (Philippines) A Albo	13	7
(India) S Karunakaran (India) A Variyath	18	19
3	(Malaysia) Goh S H (Malaysia) S J Lai	21	21

Second round
(Chinese Taipei) Chen C-k (Chinese Taipei) Hsu Y-h	9	7
(Indonesia) J Hidayatullah (Indonesia) F Pasaribu	21	21
(Thailand) D Puavaranukroh (Thailand) S Paewsampran	17	14
3	(Malaysia) Goh S H (Malaysia) S J Lai	21	21

Quarter-finals
(Indonesia) J Hidayatullah (Indonesia) F Pasaribu	21	21
3	(Malaysia) Goh S H (Malaysia) S J Lai	15	11

==== Section 4 ====
First round
(Malaysia) Yap R K (Malaysia) V Siow	18	21	21
(India) R Kapoor (India) R Gadde	21	17	17
D1	(Macau) Leong I C (Macau) Ng W C	13	14
8	(Japan) H Midorikawa (Japan) N Saito	21	21
(Chinese Taipei) Lu M-c (Chinese Taipei) Hung E-t	12	21	21
(Singapore) T Hee (Singapore) Jin YJ	21	16	16
(Indonesia) D Ferdinansyah (Indonesia) S F S Ramadhanti	11	16
2	(China) Feng YZ (China) Huang DP	21	21

Second round
(Malaysia) Yap R K (Malaysia) V Siow	6	16
8	(Japan) H Midorikawa (Japan) N Saito	21	21
(Chinese Taipei) Lu M-c (Chinese Taipei) Hung E-t	11	10
2	(China) Feng YZ (China) Huang DP	21	21

Quarter-finals
8	(Japan) H Midorikawa (Japan) N Saito	16	21	21
2	(China) Feng YZ (China) Huang DP	21	18	13

== Players ==
Nation	MS	WS	MD	WD	XD	Total	Number of players
Afghanistan	1	–	–	–	–	1	1
Bangladesh	1	–	1	–	1	3	5
Brunei	1	–	1	–	–	2	3
China (H)	4	4	4	4	4	20	32
Chinese Taipei	4	4	4	4	4	20	32
Hong Kong	2	1	1	4	4	12	21
India	3	4	4	4	4	19	31
Indonesia	3	4	4	4	4	19	31
Iran	1	–	1	–	–	2	3
Japan	4	4	4	4	4	20	32
Kazakhstan	1	1	1	–	1	4	6
Laos	1	–	–	–	–	1	1
Macau	1	1	1	1	1	5	8
Malaysia	3	4	4	4	4	19	31
Myanmar	1	1	–	–	–	2	2
Philippines	1	1	–	1	1	4	6
Saudi Arabia	1	1	1	–	1	4	6
Singapore	2	1	1	1	1	6	9
South Korea	1	3	1	2	–	7	10
Sri Lanka	1	1	1	1	1	5	8
Thailand	1	4	4	4	4	17	29
United Arab Emirates	1	–	1	1	–	3	5
Vietnam	1	1	1	1	1	5	8
Total (23 nations)	40	40	40	40	40	200	320

== Performance by nation ==
Nation	GS	R32	R16	QF	SF	F	W	Total
China	—	20	15	14	11	5	2	
Thailand	—	17	8	2	1	1	1	
Hong Kong	4	12	4	2	1	1	1	
Malaysia	3	19	9	3	1	1	1	
Japan	—	20	11	7	2	2		
Indonesia	—	19	12	7	2			
South Korea	—	7	4	2	1			
Singapore	2	6	1	1	1			
Chinese Taipei	1	20	10	1				
India	—	19	6	1				
Vietnam	5	1						
Sri Lanka	5	5						
Macau	5	3						
Philippines	4	1						
Kazakhstan	4	1						
Saudi Arabia	4							
United Arab Emirates	1	2						
Bangladesh	3	1						
Myanmar	2							
Iran	2							
Brunei	2							
Total	47	200	80	40	20	10	5	200
