= Natsu Saito =

Japanese badminton player

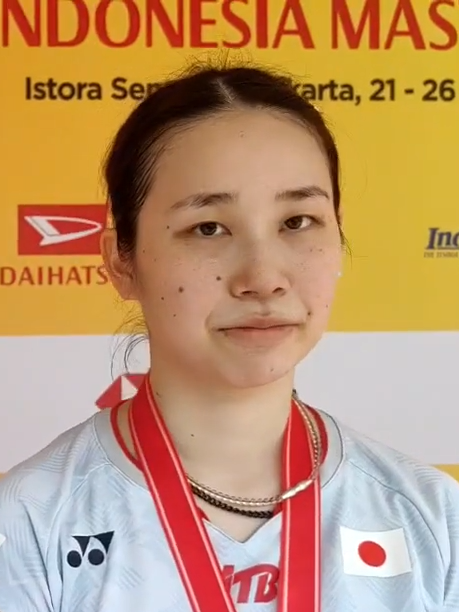
- Saito in 2025

Personal information
- Born: 9 June 2000 (age 26) Saitama Prefecture, Japan
- Height: 1.68 m (5 ft 6 in)
- Weight: 64 kg (141 lb)

Sport
- Country: Japan
- Sport: Badminton
- Handedness: Right
- Coached by: Norio Imai

Women's & mixed doubles
- Highest ranking: 7 (XD with Hiroki Midorikawa, 21 October 2025); 127 (WD with Minami Kawashima, 17 March 2020)
- Current ranking: 13 (XD with Akira Koga) (10 November 2026)
- BWF profile
Medal record
Women's badminton
Representing Japan
Sudirman Cup
Bronze medal – third place	2025 Xiamen	Mixed team
Asian Championships
Silver medal – second place	2025 Ningbo	Mixed doubles
Asia Mixed Team Championships
Bronze medal – third place	2025 Qingdao	Mixed team
World Junior Championships
Bronze medal – third place	2017 Yogyakarta	Mixed team
Bronze medal – third place	2018 Markham	Mixed team
Asian Junior Championships
Silver medal – second place	2018 Jakarta	Mixed team
Bronze medal – third place	2017 Jakarta	Mixed team

Natsu Saito (齋藤 夏, Saito Natsu; born 9 June 2000) is a Japanese badminton player. As of 2025, she is affiliated with the Plenty Global Linx badminton team. Saito is a mixed doubles specialist, best known for her partnership with Hiroki Midorikawa. Together, they reached a career-high world ranking of 7, won two World Tour Super 500 titles, and secured the silver medal at the 2025 Asian Championships.

== Career ==
=== 2015–2018: Junior career ===
Saito made her international debut at the junior level in 2015, reaching the final of the girls' doubles at the Asian U17 Junior Championships with Rumi Yoshida. In 2017, she represented Japan at the World Junior Championships, helping the team secure a bronze medal. That same year, she won the mixed doubles title at the India Junior International with Takuma Obayashi.

In 2018, Saito and partner Hiroki Midorikawa won the mixed doubles title at the German Junior. She was also part of the Japanese squads that won silver at the Asian Junior Championships and a bronze at the World Junior Championships.

=== 2019–2020: Senior debut ===
Saito began competing in senior international tournaments in 2019. In mixed doubles with Midorikawa, she won titles at the Waikato International and the Vietnam International. She also competed in women's doubles with Naru Shinoya, winning the Malaysia International and reaching the final of the Indonesia International. Additionally, she reached the final of the White Nights tournament with Minami Kawashima. By March 2020, Saito reached a career-high world ranking of 127 in women's doubles.

=== 2021–2022: International Challenge titles and Super 100 final ===
In October 2021, Saito and Midorikawa won the mixed doubles title at the Belgian International. The pair defended this title during the 2022 season. In September 2022, they reached the final of the Super 100 Canada Open, finishing as runners-up. Saito competed in her first Super 500 event at the Korea Open in April 2022, reaching the quarterfinals. In women's doubles, she reached the semifinals of the Bendigo International with Kawashima.

=== 2023: First World Tour title ===
Saito and Midorikawa began 2023 by reaching the semifinal of the Thailand Masters. In July, they won their first World Tour title at the Super 500 Canada Open, defeating the Danish pair Mathias Thyrri and Amalie Magelund. The following month, Saito reached the final of the Super 500 Australian Open, finishing as runner-up to Feng Yanzhe and Huang Dongping. In the latter half of the season, she reached the semifinal at both the Hong Kong Open and the Arctic Open.

=== 2024: Super 500 final and first World Tour Finals ===
Saito and Midorikawa after finishing as runners-up at the 2024 Indonesia Masters.

Saito and Midorikawa opened the season with a quarterfinal finish at the Malaysia Open. In late January, they reached the final of the Super 500 Indonesia Masters, finishing as runners-up to the Chinese pair Zheng Siwei and Huang Yaqiong. Throughout the year, the pair achieved semifinal finishes at the Thailand Masters and the Baoji China Masters, as well as quarterfinal appearances at the China Open and the Japan Masters. Their performance over the season qualified them for their first BWF World Tour Finals in December, where they were eliminated in the group stage.

=== 2025: Super 500 title and partnership conclusion ===
Saito and Midorikawa began the 2025 season with quarterfinal finishes at the Malaysia Open and India Open. In late January, the pair won the Super 500 Indonesia Masters title, defeating Guo Xinwa and Chen Fanghui in straight games. They became the first Japanese mixed doubles pair to win the title in the tournament's history. In March, Saito transferred to the Plenty Global Linx badminton team. At the Asian Championships in Ningbo, she and Midorikawa advanced to the final but were defeated by Hong Kong's Tang Chun Man and Tse Ying Suet, securing the silver medal. En route to the final, they defeated defending champions Feng Yanzhe and Huang Dongping in the quarterfinals. Their silver was Japan's first in mixed doubles at the Asian Championships in 49 years, following Shoichi Toganoo and Etsuko Toganoo's runner-up finish in 1976.

Saito also represented Japan in team events, winning bronze medals at both the Asia Mixed Team Championships in February and the Sudirman Cup in April. Later in the season, the pair reached the quarterfinals of the World Championships and the semifinals of the Denmark Open. In October, they achieved a career-high world ranking of 7. Saito and Midorikawa concluded their partnership at the BWF World Tour Finals in December, where they advanced to the semifinals.

=== 2026: New partnership and Canada Open title ===
Saito formed a new mixed doubles pairing with Akira Koga. The pair made their international debut at the season-opening Malaysia Open, where they reached the second round, before advancing to the semifinals of the Thailand Masters. In July, the pair won the Canada Open, marking their first Super 300 title together.

Later in the season they reached the semifinals of the Japan Open and the quarterfinals of the Denmark Open, where they defeated the reigning world champions Thom Gicquel and Delphine Delrue.

== Achievements ==
=== Asian Championships ===
Mixed doubles
Year	Venue	Partner	Opponent	Score	Result	Ref.
2025	Ningbo Olympic Sports Center Gymnasium; Ningbo, China	(Japan) Hiroki Midorikawa	(Hong Kong) Tang Chun Man (Hong Kong) Tse Ying Suet	15–21, 21–17, 13–21	Silver	

=== BWF World Tour (3 titles, 3 runners-up) ===
The BWF World Tour, which was announced on 19 March 2017 and implemented in 2018, is a series of elite badminton tournaments sanctioned by the Badminton World Federation (BWF). The BWF World Tour is divided into levels of World Tour Finals, Super 1000, Super 750, Super 500, Super 300, and the BWF Tour Super 100.

Mixed doubles
Year	Tournament	Level	Partner	Opponent	Score	Result	Ref.
2022	Canada Open	Super 100	(Japan) Hiroki Midorikawa	(Chinese Taipei) Ye Hong-wei (Chinese Taipei) Lee Chia-hsin	21–12, 12–21, 15–21	(silver) Runner-up	
2023	Canada Open	Super 500	(Japan) Hiroki Midorikawa	(Denmark) Mathias Thyrri (Denmark) Amalie Magelund	21–17, 16–21, 21–13	(gold) Winner	
2023	Australian Open	Super 500	(Japan) Hiroki Midorikawa	(China) Feng Yanzhe (China) Huang Dongping	14–21, 21–16, 15–21	(silver) Runner-up	
2024	Indonesia Masters	Super 500	(Japan) Hiroki Midorikawa	(China) Zheng Siwei (China) Huang Yaqiong	15–21, 16–21	(silver) Runner-up	
2025	Indonesia Masters	Super 500	(Japan) Hiroki Midorikawa	(China) Guo Xinwa (China) Chen Fanghui	21–15, 21–17	(gold) Winner	
2026	Canada Open	Super 300	(Japan) Akira Koga	(Chinese Taipei) Liu Kuang-heng (Chinese Taipei) Hsu Yin-hui	21–17, 17–21, 21–17	(gold) Winner	

=== BWF International Challenge/Series (5 titles, 2 runners-up) ===
Women's doubles
Year	Tournament	Partner	Opponent	Score	Result	Ref.
2019	White Nights	(Japan) Minami Kawashima	(Japan) Yukino Nakai (Japan) Nao Ono	21–18, 17–21, 13–21	(silver) Runner-up	
2019	Indonesia International	(Japan) Naru Shinoya	(Indonesia) Anggia Shitta Awanda (Indonesia) Pia Zebadiah Bernadet	19–21, 18–21	(silver) Runner-up	
2019	Malaysia International	(Japan) Naru Shinoya	(Indonesia) Yulfira Barkah (Indonesia) Agatha Imanuela	21–15, 21–23, 21–9	(gold) Winner	

Mixed doubles
Year	Tournament	Partner	Opponent	Score	Result	Ref.
2019	Waikato International	(Japan) Hiroki Midorikawa	(Australia) Simon Leung (Australia) Gronya Somerville	21–15, 21–13	(gold) Winner	
2019	Vietnam International	(Japan) Hiroki Midorikawa	(Thailand) Vichayapong Kanjanakeereewong (Thailand) Ruethaichanok Laisuan	21–16, 21–8	(gold) Winner	
2021	Belgian International	(Japan) Hiroki Midorikawa	(Denmark) Jesper Toft (Denmark) Clara Graversen	21–18, 21–9	(gold) Winner	
2022	Belgian International	(Japan) Hiroki Midorikawa	(Chinese Taipei) Chiu Hsiang-chieh (Chinese Taipei) Lin Xiao-min	21–13, 21–17	(gold) Winner	

BWF International Challenge tournament
BWF International Series tournament

=== BWF Junior International (2 titles, 3 runners-up) ===
Girls' doubles
Year	Tournament	Partner	Opponent	Score	Result	Ref.
2017	German Junior	(Japan) Rin Iwanaga	(South Korea) Kim Min-ji (South Korea) Seong Ah-yeong	16–21, 14–21	(silver) Runner-up	

Mixed doubles
Year	Tournament	Partner	Opponent	Score	Result	Ref.
2017	India Junior International	(Japan) Takuma Obayashi	(Indonesia) Rinov Rivaldy (Indonesia) Angelica Wiratama	18–21, 21–16, 21–17	(gold) Winner	
2018	Dutch Junior	(Japan) Hiroki Midorikawa	(China) Guo Xinwa (China) Liu Xuanxuan	21–16, 18–21, 19–21	(silver) Runner-up	
2018	German Junior	(Japan) Hiroki Midorikawa	(South Korea) Wang Chan (South Korea) Jeong Na-eun	19–21, 21–18, 21–17	(gold) Winner	
2018	Banthongyord Junior International	(Japan) Hiroki Midorikawa	(Thailand) Kunlavut Vitidsarn (Thailand) Lalinrat Chaiwan	21–23, 18–21	(silver) Runner-up	

BWF Junior International Grand Prix tournament
BWF Junior International Challenge tournament

== Record against selected opponents ==
Record against year-end Finals finalists, World Championships semi-finalists, and Olympic quarter-finalists. Accurate as of 7 November 2026.

=== Akira Koga ===
Players	M	W	L	Diff.
(China) Feng Yanzhe & Huang Dongping	2	0	2	–2
(China) Guo Xinwa & Chen Fanghui	1	0	1	–1
(China) Jiang Zhenbang & Wei Yaxin	1	0	1	–1

Players	M	W	L	Diff.
(France) Thom Gicquel & Delphine Delrue	1	1	0	+1
(Indonesia) Amri Syahnawi & Nita Violina Marwah	1	0	1	–1

=== Hiroki Midorikawa ===
Players	M	W	L	Diff.
(China) Feng Yanzhe & Huang Dongping	11	1	10	–9
(China) Guo Xinwa & Chen Fanghui	2	1	1	0
(China) Jiang Zhenbang & Wei Yaxin	6	1	5	–4
(China) Zheng Siwei & Huang Yaqiong	6	1	5	–4
(England) Marcus Ellis & Lauren Smith	1	0	1	–1
(France) Thom Gicquel & Delphine Delrue	4	2	2	0
(Germany) Mark Lamsfuß & Isabel Lohau	2	1	1	0
(Hong Kong) Tang Chun Man & Tse Ying Suet	2	1	1	0

Players	M	W	L	Diff.
(Indonesia) Amri Syahnawi & Nita Violina Marwah	3	2	1	+1
(Indonesia) Praveen Jordan & Melati Daeva Oktavianti	1	1	0	+1
(Japan) Yuta Watanabe & Arisa Higashino	2	0	2	–2
(Japan) Kyohei Yamashita & Naru Shinoya	4	3	1	+2
(Malaysia) Chen Tang Jie & Toh Ee Wei	6	2	4	–2
(South Korea) Kim Won-ho & Jeong Na-eun	4	1	3	–2
(Thailand) Dechapol Puavaranukroh & Sapsiree Taerattanachai	1	1	0	+1
