= Hiroki Midorikawa =

Japanese badminton player (born 2000)

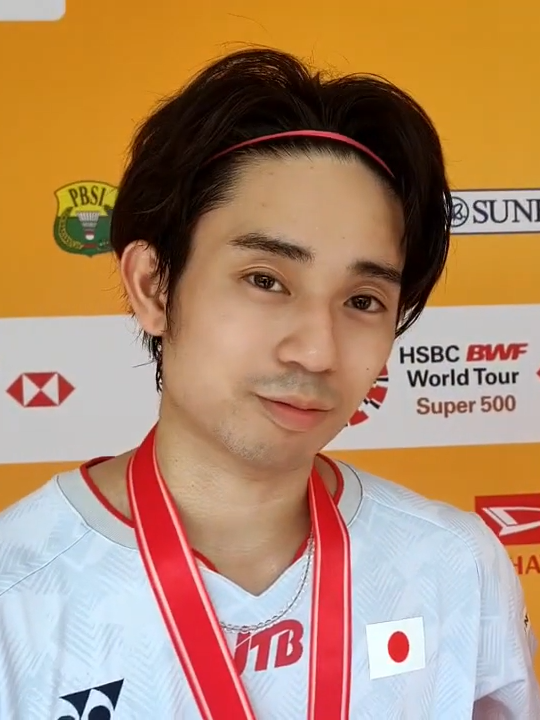
- Midorikawa in 2025

Personal information
- Born: 17 May 2000 (age 26) Saitama Prefecture, Japan
- Height: 1.61 m (5 ft 3 in)
- Weight: 56 kg (123 lb)

Sport
- Country: Japan
- Sport: Badminton
- Handedness: Right
- Coached by: Norio Imai

Men's & mixed doubles
- Highest ranking: 7 (XD with Natsu Saito, 21 October 2025); 17 (MD with Kyohei Yamashita, 20 March 2026)
- Current ranking: 87 (XD with Nami Matsuyama) (27 October 2026)
- BWF profile
Medal record
Men's badminton
Representing Japan
Sudirman Cup
| Bronze medal – third place | 2025 Xiamen | Mixed team |
Asian Championships
| Silver medal – second place | 2025 Ningbo | Mixed doubles |
Asia Mixed Team Championships
| Bronze medal – third place | 2025 Qingdao | Mixed team |
World Junior Championships
| Bronze medal – third place | 2017 Yogyakarta | Mixed team |
| Bronze medal – third place | 2018 Markham | Mixed team |
Asian Junior Championships
| Silver medal – second place | 2018 Jakarta | Mixed team |
| Bronze medal – third place | 2017 Jakarta | Mixed team |

Hiroki Midorikawa (緑川 大輝, Midorikawa Hiroki; born 17 May 2000) is a Japanese badminton player who competes in doubles. He plays for the NTT East team and is a member of the Japanese national team. He primarily competes in mixed doubles with Natsu Saito, reaching a career-high world ranking of No. 7. The pair won two World Tour Super 500 titles – the 2023 Canada Open and the 2025 Indonesia Masters – and were silver medalists at the 2025 Asian Championships. In men's doubles, he partners with Kyohei Yamashita, achieving a career-high world ranking of 17.

== Early life ==
Hiroki Midorikawa was born on 17 May 2000 in Saitama Prefecture. Encouraged by his parents and older sister, he began playing badminton at the age of seven. He attended Saitama Sakae Junior and Senior High School. During junior high school, Midorikawa won the team title and finished as runner-up in singles at the National Junior High School Tournament. In 2017, during his second year of high school, Midorikawa won the boys' doubles title at the All Japan Junior Championships. That same year, he formed a mixed doubles partnership with his classmate Natsu Saito. In 2018, during his final year at Saitama Sakae High School, he achieved a triple crown at the Inter-High School Championships by winning the team, singles and boys' doubles titles.

From 2019 to 2023, Midorikawa studied sports science at Waseda University. In October 2021, he won the men's singles title and finished as runner-up in men's doubles with Shuta Machida at the All Japan Intercollegiate Championships. The following month, he won the All Japan Student Mixed Doubles Championships with Rumi Yoshida.

== Career ==
=== 2017–2019: Junior career and early international titles ===
At the international junior level, Midorikawa represented Japan in team competitions, winning bronze medals in the mixed team events at both the 2017 and 2018 World Junior Championships. He also earned a bronze medal in 2017 and a silver medal in 2018 at the Asian Junior Championships. In mixed doubles with Natsu Saito, he won the German Junior title in 2018 and finished as runner-up at the Dutch Junior and Banthongyord Junior International.

In 2019, Midorikawa and Saito won their first senior international title together at the Waikato International, followed by another title at the Vietnam International. In men's doubles, Midorikawa partnered Kyohei Yamashita to win the Malaysia International later that year, defeating Liang Weikeng and Shang Yichen in the final.

=== 2021–2022: International Challenge titles and national champions ===
In the 2021 season, Midorikawa and Natsu Saito were selected for Japan's B national team in mixed doubles. In October, the pair won the mixed doubles title at the Belgian International, defeating Denmark's Jesper Toft and Clara Graversen in the final. In December, they won the mixed doubles title at the All Japan Championships, defeating Sumiya Nihei and Minami Asakura in the final.

The following year, Midorikawa and Saito successfully defended their Belgian International title by defeating Chiu Hsiang-chieh and Lin Xiao-min of Chinese Taipei. In October, they reached their first BWF World Tour final at the Super 100 Canada Open, finishing as runners-up to Ye Hong-wei and Lee Chia-hsin.

=== 2023–2024: Professional debut and first World Tour title ===
Midorikawa and Saito after finishing as runners-up at the 2024 Indonesia Masters.

After graduating from Waseda University, Midorikawa joined the NTT East corporate badminton team in April 2023. He and Saito were subsequently promoted to the Japanese national A team under coach Jeremy Gan. The pair won their first World Tour title at the Super 500 Canada Open, defeating Mathias Thyrri and Amalie Magelund in the final. They also finished as runners-up at the Australian Open and reached the semi-finals of both the Hong Kong Open and Arctic Open. In men's doubles, Midorikawa partnered Kyohei Yamashita to win the Osaka International title.

Midorikawa and Saito opened 2024 by reaching the mixed doubles final at the Indonesia Masters, finishing as runners-up to top seeds Zheng Siwei and Huang Yaqiong. They later qualified for their first season-ending BWF World Tour Finals, where they were eliminated in the round-robin stage.

In men's doubles, Midorikawa and Yamashita resumed international partnership in August 2024, winning back-to-back titles at the Sydney International and the North Harbour International. Domestically, the pair completed a treble by winning all three major Japanese national tournaments: the Japan Ranking Circuit, the All Japan Members Championships, and the All Japan Championships.

=== 2025: Second Super 500 title, Asian Championships silver ===
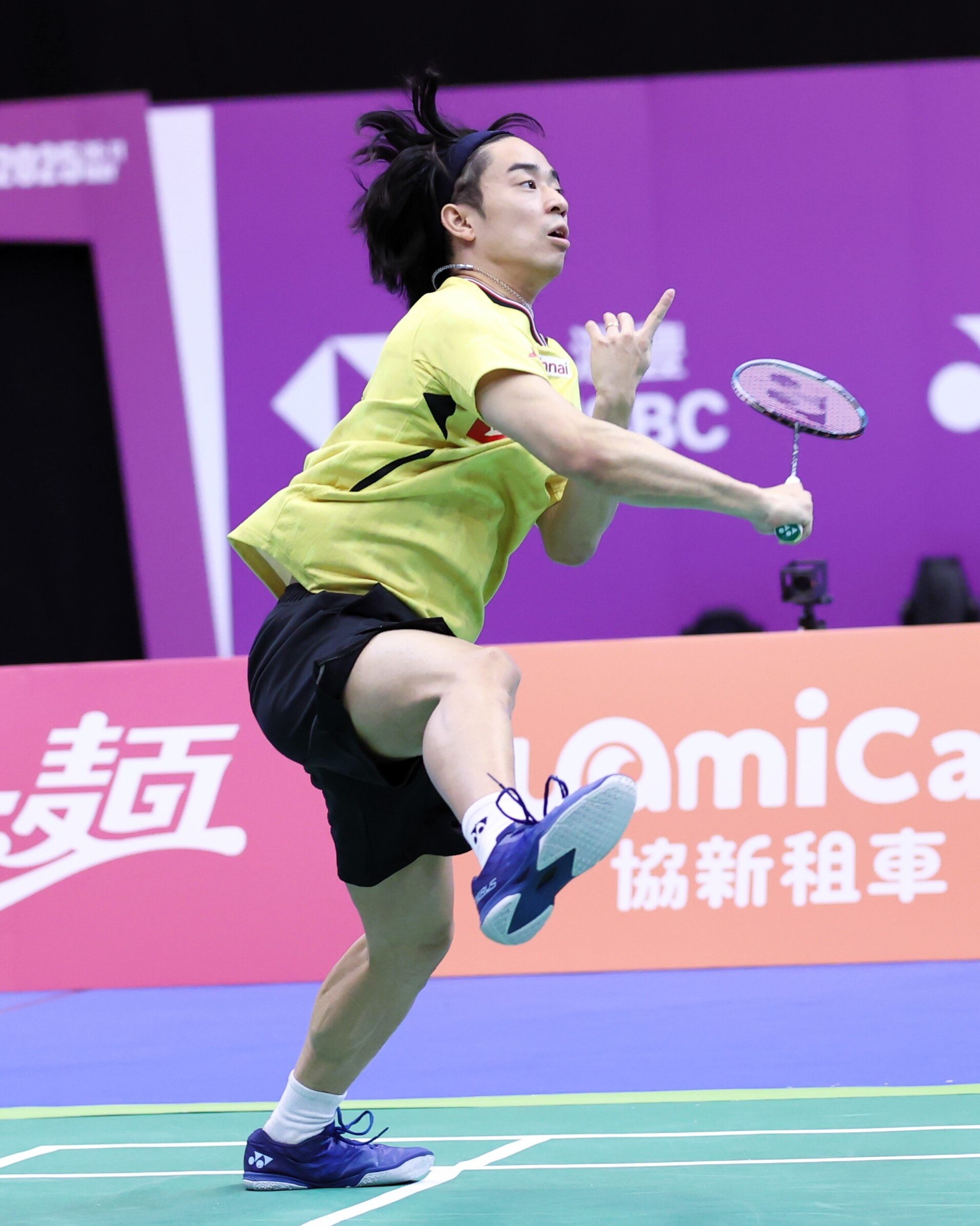
Midorikawa competing at the 2025 Taipei Open.

Midorikawa was selected for the Japanese national team in both mixed and men's doubles. He contributed to the Japanese squads that earned bronze medals at the Asia Mixed Team Championships and at the Sudirman Cup.

In mixed doubles, Midorikawa and Saito claimed the Super 500 Indonesia Masters title in January by defeating Guo Xinwa and Chen Fanghui, becoming the first Japanese pair to win the mixed doubles event in tournament history. In April, they secured silver at the Asian Championships, Japan's first mixed doubles silver at the tournament in 49 years, following Shoichi Toganoo and Etsuko Toganoo's runner-up finish in 1976. En route to the final, they defeated defending champions Feng Yanzhe and Huang Dongping in the quarterfinals. The pair reached the semifinals of the Denmark Open and the quarterfinals of the World Championships. They achieved a career-high world ranking of No. 7 in October. In November, Midorikawa announced a new mixed doubles partnership with Nami Matsuyama, with the pair aiming to compete at the 2028 Summer Olympics. Midorikawa and Saito played their final tournament together at the World Tour Finals in December, reaching the semifinals.

In men's doubles, Midorikawa and Yamashita reached the semifinals of the Swiss Open in March and the Taipei Open in May. They achieved a career-high world ranking of No. 25 in September. The pair concluded the season with a runner-up finish at the Super 500 Japan Masters in November, losing to Kim Won-ho and Seo Seung-jae.

At the All Japan Championships in December, Midorikawa and Yamashita successfully defended their men's doubles title, defeating Hiroki Okamura and Kenya Mitsuhashi in the final. In mixed doubles, Midorikawa made his first official tournament appearance with Matsuyama. The new pair reached the final, where they finished as runners-up to Yuta Watanabe and Maya Taguchi.

=== 2026 ===
Midorikawa and Nami Matsuyama made their international debut as a pair at the Super 1000 Malaysia Open in January, losing in the first round to Cheng Xing and Zhang Chi. At the India Open the following week, they were eliminated in the second round by fifth seeds Thom Gicquel and Delphine Delrue. They won their first title together at the Polish Open in March, defeating Jeppe Søby and Sofie Røjkjær in the final. Later that month, they reached the final of the Vietnam International, but finished as runners-up after retiring due to a knee injury sustained by Matsuyama. Following Matsuyama's surgery, Midorikawa briefly partnered Misaki Matsutomo in July, suffering first-round exits at both the Japan Open and the China Open. He was entered with Mao Yamakita for the Japan Masters in November.

In men's doubles, Midorikawa and Yamashita reached their first Super 750 final at the India Open, marking the best finish of their partnership. En route to the final, they defeated Satwiksairaj Rankireddy and Chirag Shetty in the second round, and Aaron Chia and Soh Wooi Yik in the semifinals. They finished as runners-up to Liang Weikeng and Wang Chang after losing the final in three games. They made their final tournament appearance together at the Indonesia Masters, exiting in the second round, before both players declined selection for the 2026 national team. In May, Midorikawa was called up to Japan's Thomas Cup squad as an injury replacement for Yugo Kobayashi, with the team finishing fifth. He subsequently partnered Yuto Nakashizu for the Taipei Open and Korea Masters, where they were eliminated in the early rounds of both tournaments.

== Playing style ==
Standing at 1.61 metres (5 ft 3 in), Midorikawa describes himself as "self-paced and positive." When a shoulder injury prevented him from smashing, instead of being discouraged, he proactively used the opportunity to improve the precision of his drop shots and clears, as well as his footwork. Midorikawa views his relatively short stature as an advantage, believing his high energy and mobility help overcome limitations sometimes associated with shorter players, contrasting the common view that taller players have a natural advantage.

== Personal life ==
Midorikawa married on 2 February 2025. He is a fan of the Saitama Seibu Lions, a baseball team based in his hometown of Tokorozawa.

== Achievements ==
=== Asian Championships ===
Mixed doubles
| Year | Venue | Partner | Opponent | Score | Result | Ref. |
|---|---|---|---|---|---|---|
| 2025 | Ningbo Olympic Sports Center Gymnasium; Ningbo, China | (Japan) Natsu Saito | (Hong Kong) Tang Chun Man (Hong Kong) Tse Ying Suet | 15–21, 21–17, 13–21 | Silver | |

=== BWF World Tour (2 titles, 5 runners-up) ===
The BWF World Tour, which was announced on 19 March 2017 and implemented in 2018, is a series of elite badminton tournaments sanctioned by the Badminton World Federation (BWF). The BWF World Tour is divided into levels of World Tour Finals, Super 1000, Super 750, Super 500, Super 300, and the BWF Tour Super 100.

Men's doubles
| Year | Tournament | Level | Partner | Opponent | Score | Result | Ref. |
|---|---|---|---|---|---|---|---|
| 2025 | Japan Masters | Super 500 | (Japan) Kyohei Yamashita | (South Korea) Kim Won-ho (South Korea) Seo Seung-jae | 22–20, 11–21, 16–21 | (silver) Runner-up | |
| 2026 | India Open | Super 750 | (Japan) Kyohei Yamashita | (China) Liang Weikeng (China) Wang Chang | 21–17, 23–25, 16–21 | (silver) Runner-up | |

Mixed doubles
| Year | Tournament | Level | Partner | Opponent | Score | Result | Ref. |
|---|---|---|---|---|---|---|---|
| 2022 | Canada Open | Super 100 | (Japan) Natsu Saito | (Chinese Taipei) Ye Hong-wei (Chinese Taipei) Lee Chia-hsin | 21–12, 12–21, 15–21 | (silver) Runner-up | |
| 2023 | Canada Open | Super 500 | (Japan) Natsu Saito | (Denmark) Mathias Thyrri (Denmark) Amalie Magelund | 21–17, 16–21, 21–13 | (gold) Winner | |
| 2023 | Australian Open | Super 500 | (Japan) Natsu Saito | (China) Feng Yanzhe (China) Huang Dongping | 14–21, 21–16, 15–21 | (silver) Runner-up | |
| 2024 | Indonesia Masters | Super 500 | (Japan) Natsu Saito | (China) Zheng Siwei (China) Huang Yaqiong | 15–21, 16–21 | (silver) Runner-up | |
| 2025 | Indonesia Masters | Super 500 | (Japan) Natsu Saito | (China) Guo Xinwa (China) Chen Fanghui | 21–15, 21–17 | (gold) Winner | |

=== BWF International Challenge/Series (9 titles, 1 runner-up) ===
Men's doubles
| Year | Tournament | Partner | Opponent | Score | Result | Ref. |
|---|---|---|---|---|---|---|
| 2019 | Malaysia International | (Japan) Kyohei Yamashita | (China) Liang Weikeng (China) Shang Yichen | 18–21, 21–10, 21–16 | (gold) Winner | |
| 2023 | Osaka International | (Japan) Kyohei Yamashita | (Chinese Taipei) Wei Chun-wei (Chinese Taipei) Wu Guan-xun | 21–14, 21–14 | (gold) Winner | |
| 2024 | Sydney International | (Japan) Kyohei Yamashita | (Chinese Taipei) Lai Po-yu (Chinese Taipei) Tsai Fu-cheng | 21–14, 21–16 | (gold) Winner | |
| 2024 | North Harbour International | (Japan) Kyohei Yamashita | (Chinese Taipei) Lai Po-yu (Chinese Taipei) Tsai Fu-cheng | 16–21, 21–14, 21–14 | (gold) Winner | |

Mixed doubles
| Year | Tournament | Partner | Opponent | Score | Result | Ref. |
|---|---|---|---|---|---|---|
| 2019 | Waikato International | (Japan) Natsu Saito | (Australia) Simon Leung (Australia) Gronya Somerville | 21–15, 21–13 | (gold) Winner | |
| 2019 | Vietnam International | (Japan) Natsu Saito | (Thailand) Vichayapong Kanjanakeereewong (Thailand) Ruethaichanok Laisuan | 21–16, 21–8 | (gold) Winner | |
| 2021 | Belgian International | (Japan) Natsu Saito | (Denmark) Jesper Toft (Denmark) Clara Graversen | 21–18, 21–9 | (gold) Winner | |
| 2022 | Belgian International | (Japan) Natsu Saito | (Chinese Taipei) Chiu Hsiang-chieh (Chinese Taipei) Lin Xiao-min | 21–13, 21–17 | (gold) Winner | |
| 2026 | Polish Open | (Japan) Nami Matsuyama | (Denmark) Jeppe Søby (Denmark) Sofie Røjkjær | 21–11, 21–13 | (gold) Winner | |
| 2026 | Vietnam International | (Japan) Nami Matsuyama | (Hong Kong) Chan Yin Chak (Hong Kong) Ng Tsz Yau | 17–14 retired | (silver) Runner-up | |

BWF International Challenge tournament
BWF International Series tournament

=== BWF Junior International (1 title, 2 runners-up) ===
Mixed doubles
| Year | Tournament | Partner | Opponent | Score | Result | Ref. |
|---|---|---|---|---|---|---|
| 2018 | Dutch Junior | (Japan) Natsu Saito | (China) Guo Xinwa (China) Liu Xuanxuan | 21–16, 18–21, 19–21 | (silver) Runner-up | |
| 2018 | German Junior | (Japan) Natsu Saito | (South Korea) Wang Chan (South Korea) Jeong Na-eun | 19–21, 21–18, 21–17 | (gold) Winner | |
| 2018 | Banthongyord Junior International | (Japan) Natsu Saito | (Thailand) Kunlavut Vitidsarn (Thailand) Lalinrat Chaiwan | 21–23, 18–21 | (silver) Runner-up | |

BWF Junior International Grand Prix tournament
BWF Junior International Challenge tournament

== Record against selected opponents ==
Record against year-end Finals finalists, World Championships semi-finalists, and Olympic quarter-finalists. Accurate as of 24 December 2025.

=== Natsu Saito ===
| Players | M | W | L | Diff. |
|---|---|---|---|---|
| (China) Feng Yanzhe & Huang Dongping | 11 | 1 | 10 | –9 |
| (China) Guo Xinwa & Chen Fanghui | 2 | 1 | 1 | 0 |
| (China) Jiang Zhenbang & Wei Yaxin | 6 | 1 | 5 | –4 |
| (China) Zheng Siwei & Huang Yaqiong | 6 | 1 | 5 | –4 |
| (England) Marcus Ellis & Lauren Smith | 1 | 0 | 1 | –1 |
| (France) Thom Gicquel & Delphine Delrue | 4 | 2 | 2 | 0 |
| (Germany) Mark Lamsfuß & Isabel Lohau | 2 | 1 | 1 | 0 |

| Players | M | W | L | Diff. |
|---|---|---|---|---|
| (Hong Kong) Tang Chun Man & Tse Ying Suet | 2 | 1 | 1 | 0 |
| (Indonesia) Praveen Jordan & Melati Daeva Oktavianti | 1 | 1 | 0 | +1 |
| (Japan) Yuta Watanabe & Arisa Higashino | 2 | 0 | 2 | –2 |
| (Japan) Kyohei Yamashita & Naru Shinoya | 4 | 3 | 1 | +2 |
| (Malaysia) Chen Tang Jie & Toh Ee Wei | 6 | 2 | 4 | –2 |
| (South Korea) Kim Won-ho & Jeong Na-eun | 4 | 1 | 3 | –2 |
| (Thailand) Dechapol Puavaranukroh & Sapsiree Taerattanachai | 1 | 1 | 0 | +1 |
