= Naru Shinoya =

Japanese badminton player (born 1994)

Personal information
- Born: 18 March 1994 (age 32) Ōbu, Aichi, Japan
- Height: 1.60 m (5 ft 3 in)

Sport
- Country: Japan
- Sport: Badminton
- Handedness: Right
- Coached by: Jeremy Gan
- Retired: 30 December 2024

Women's & mixed doubles
- Highest ranking: 13 (XD with Kyohei Yamashita, 27 December 2022); 22 (WD with Ayane Kurihara, 19 March 2015)
- BWF profile
Medal record
Women's badminton
Representing Japan
World Championships
Bronze medal – third place	2021 Huelva	Mixed doubles
Sudirman Cup
Bronze medal – third place	2023 Suzhou	Mixed team
Asian Games
Bronze medal – third place	2022 Hangzhou	Women's team

Naru Shinoya (篠谷 菜留, Shinoya Naru; born 18 March 1994) is a former Japanese badminton player who competed for the NTT East team. She won a bronze medal in mixed doubles at the 2021 World Championships. Shinoya achieved a career-high world ranking of No. 13 in mixed doubles with her partner Kyohei Yamashita in December 2022. After retiring from professional competition in December 2024, she became the women's doubles coach for NTT East in April 2025.

== Career ==
=== 2021 ===
Shinoya and Kyohei Yamashita made their Super 750 debut at the Indonesia Masters, where they were eliminated in the first round. The following week, they advanced to the second round at the Indonesia Open, marking their Super 1000 debut. The pair concluded the season by capturing the mixed doubles bronze medal at the 2021 World Championships in Huelva, Spain, following a semifinal defeat to compatriots Yuta Watanabe and Arisa Higashino.

=== 2022–2023 ===
Shinoya and Yamashita's best results on the 2022 World Tour were quarterfinal finishes at the Denmark Open and Australian Open. They ended the year by reaching their career-best world ranking of No. 13.

In 2023, Shinoya helped Japan win a bronze medal at the Sudirman Cup. On the World Tour, she and Yamashita reached the quarterfinals of the All England Open and the semifinals of the German Open and the Canada Open.

=== 2024 ===
In the first half of 2024, Shinoya and Yamashita competed in mixed doubles to qualify for the 2024 Paris Olympics. Their best World Tour result was a quarterfinal finish at the Thailand Masters. After failing to secure Olympic qualification, Shinoya retired from the national team in April, ending her partnership with Yamashita.

Continuing to compete for her corporate team, NTT East, Shinoya partnered with Nao Yamakita in women's doubles and won the Malaysia International in September. Shinoya officially concluded her professional playing career at the All Japan Championships in December, where she secured the mixed doubles title alongside Kazuki Shibata before formally announcing her retirement from the sport.

== Coaching career ==
In April 2025, Shinoya became the women's doubles coach for NTT East, tasked with developing junior players for the national team. The following month, Hinata Suzuki and Nao Yamakita, a pair representing NTT East, won the women's doubles title at the Japan Ranking Circuit by defeating Arisa Igarashi and Kie Nakanishi. Following this victory, Suzuki and Yamakita were selected for the Japanese national team on 6 June 2025.

== Achievements ==
=== World Championships ===
Mixed doubles
Year	Venue	Partner	Opponent	Score	Result
2021	Palacio de los Deportes Carolina Marín; Huelva, Spain	(Japan) Kyohei Yamashita	(Japan) Yuta Watanabe (Japan) Arisa Higashino	13–21, 8–21	Bronze

=== BWF World Tour (2 runners-up) ===
The BWF World Tour, which was announced on 19 March 2017 and implemented in 2018, is a series of elite badminton tournaments sanctioned by the Badminton World Federation (BWF). The BWF World Tour is divided into levels of World Tour Finals, Super 1000, Super 750, Super 500, Super 300 (part of the HSBC World Tour), and the BWF Tour Super 100.

Women's doubles
Year	Tournament	Level	Partner	Opponent	Score	Result
2018	Chinese Taipei Open	Super 300	(Japan) Ayane Kurihara	(Japan) Nami Matsuyama (Japan) Chiharu Shida	10–21, 17–21	(silver) Runner-up

Mixed doubles
Year	Tournament	Level	Partner	Opponent	Score	Result
2019	Akita Masters	Super 100	(Japan) Kyohei Yamashita	(South Korea) Ko Sung-hyun (South Korea) Eom Hye-won	10–21, 17–21	(silver) Runner-up

=== BWF Grand Prix (3 runners-up) ===
The BWF Grand Prix had two levels, the Grand Prix and Grand Prix Gold. It was a series of badminton tournaments sanctioned by the Badminton World Federation (BWF) and played between 2007 and 2017.

Women's doubles
Year	Tournament	Partner	Opponent	Score	Result
2015	Swiss Open	(Japan) Ayane Kurihara	(China) Bao Yixin (China) Tang Yuanting	19–21, 21–14, 17–21	(silver) Runner-up
2015	U.S. Open	(Japan) Ayane Kurihara	(China) Yu Yang (China) Zhong Qianxin	14–21, 10–21	(silver) Runner-up
2017	Canada Open	(Japan) Chisato Hoshi	(Japan) Mayu Matsumoto (Japan) Wakana Nagahara	16–21, 21–16, 18–21	(silver) Runner-up

BWF Grand Prix Gold tournament
BWF Grand Prix tournament

=== BWF International Challenge/Series (8 titles, 5 runners-up) ===
Women's doubles
Year	Tournament	Partner	Opponent	Score	Result
2014	Polish Open	(Japan) Ayane Kurihara	(Russia) Anastasia Chervaykova (Russia) Nina Vislova	21–15, 17–21, 20–22	(silver) Runner-up
2014	Malaysia International	(Japan) Ayane Kurihara	(Indonesia) Maretha Dea Giovani (Indonesia) Rosyita Eka Putri Sari	21–14, 21–17	(gold) Winner
2015	China International	(Japan) Ayane Kurihara	(China) Ou Dongni (China) Yu Xiaohan	21–14, 18–21, 21–23	(silver) Runner-up
2015	Portugal International	(Japan) Ayane Kurihara	(Germany) Carola Bott (Germany) Jennifer Karnott	21–13, 21–16	(gold) Winner
2016	Brazil International	(Japan) Chisato Hoshi	(Australia) Setyana Mapasa (Australia) Gronya Somerville	21–13, 21–19	(gold) Winner
2016	Peru International	(Japan) Chisato Hoshi	(Turkey) Cemre Fere (Turkey) Ebru Yazgan	21–5, 21–7	(gold) Winner
2017	Portugal International	(Japan) Chisato Hoshi	(Denmark) Emilie Juul Moller (Denmark) Mai Surrow	21–13, 21–6	(gold) Winner
2017	Finnish Open	(Japan) Chisato Hoshi	(Japan) Misato Aratama (Japan) Akane Watanabe	18–21, 13–21	(silver) Runner-up
2017	Smiling Fish International	(Japan) Chisato Hoshi	(Japan) Nami Matsuyama (Japan) Chiharu Shida	19–21, 14–21	(silver) Runner-up
2019	Indonesia International	(Japan) Natsu Saito	(Indonesia) Anggia Shitta Awanda (Indonesia) Pia Zebadiah Bernadet	19–21, 18–21	(silver) Runner-up
2019	Malaysia International	(Japan) Natsu Saito	(Indonesia) Yulfira Barkah (Indonesia) Agatha Imanuela	21–15, 21–23, 21–9	(gold) Winner
2024	Malaysia International	(Japan) Nao Yamakita	(Japan) Hinata Suzuki (Japan) An Uesugi	21–13, 12–21, 21–17	(gold) Winner

Mixed doubles
Year	Tournament	Partner	Opponent	Score	Result
2017	Malaysia International	(Japan) Hiroki Okamura	(Malaysia) Yogendran Khrishnan (India) Prajakta Sawant	21–10, 24–22	(gold) Winner

BWF International Challenge tournament
BWF International Series tournament

== Record against selected opponents ==
Record against year-end Finals finalists, World Championships semi-finalists, and Olympic quarter-finalists. Accurate as of 23 August 2026.

=== Kyohei Yamashita ===
Players	M	W	L	Diff.
(China) Feng Yanzhe & Huang Dongping	5	1	4	–3
(China) Jiang Zhenbang & Wei Yaxin	2	0	2	–2
(China) Zheng Siwei & Huang Yaqiong	2	0	2	–2
(England) Marcus Ellis & Lauren Smith	3	3	0	+3
(France) Thom Gicquel & Delphine Delrue	1	0	1	–1
(Germany) Mark Lamsfuß & Isabel Lohau	3	3	0	+3
(Hong Kong) Tang Chun Man & Tse Ying Suet	3	1	2	–1

Players	M	W	L	Diff.
(Indonesia) Praveen Jordan & Melati Daeva Oktavianti	2	0	2	–2
(Japan) Yuta Watanabe & Arisa Higashino	3	0	3	–3
(Malaysia) Chen Tang Jie & Toh Ee Wei	1	0	1	–1
(South Korea) Kim Won-ho & Jeong Na-eun	8	1	7	–6
(South Korea) Seo Seung-jae & Chae Yoo-jung	2	0	2	–2
(Thailand) Dechapol Puavaranukroh & Sapsiree Taerattanachai	3	1	2	–1

=== Ayane Kurihara ===
Players	M	W	L	Diff.
(Bulgaria) Gabriela Stoeva & Stefani Stoeva	1	1	0	+1
(China) Chen Qingchen & Jia Yifan	1	1	0	+1
(China) Luo Ying & Luo Yu	1	0	1	–1
(China) Wang Xiaoli & Yu Yang	1	0	1	–1
(Denmark) Christinna Pedersen & Kamilla Rytter Juhl	1	0	1	–1
(India) Jwala Gutta & Ashwini Ponnappa	2	1	1	0
(Indonesia) Nitya Krishinda Maheswari & Greysia Polii	3	0	3	–3
(Japan) Nami Matsuyama & Chiharu Shida	1	0	1	–1

Players	M	W	L	Diff.
(Japan) Naoko Fukuman & Kurumi Yonao	1	1	0	+1
(Japan) Reika Kakiiwa & Miyuki Maeda	1	1	0	+1
(Japan) Shiho Tanaka & Koharu Yonemoto	1	1	0	+1
(Japan) Yuki Fukushima & Sayaka Hirota	1	1	0	+1
(Malaysia) Vivian Hoo & Woon Khe Wei	1	0	1	–1
(South Korea) Chang Ye-na & Lee So-hee	1	0	1	–1
(South Korea) Jung Kyung-eun & Shin Seung-chan	1	0	1	–1

=== Chisato Hoshi ===
Players	M	W	L	Diff.
(Denmark) Maiken Fruergaard & Sara Thygesen	1	0	1	–1
(Japan) Mayu Matsumoto & Wakana Nagahara	1	0	1	–1
(Japan) Nami Matsuyama & Chiharu Shida	2	1	1	0
(South Korea) Lee So-hee & Shin Seung-chan	2	1	1	0

=== Yuki Fukushima ===
Players	M	W	L	Diff.
(China) Zhang Shuxian & Zheng Yu	1	0	1	–1
(South Korea) Lee So-hee & Shin Seung-chan	1	0	1	–1

=== Arisa Higashino ===
Players	M	W	L	Diff.
(South Korea) Chang Ye-na & Lee So-hee	1	0	1	–1
