= Kyohei Yamashita =

Japanese badminton player (born 1998)

Kyōhei Yamashita
- Yamashita at the 2026 Canada Open

Personal information
- Native name: 山下 恭平
- Born: October 12, 1998 (age 28) Okayama Prefecture, Japan
- Height: 1.66 m (5 ft 5 in)
- Weight: 69 kg (152 lb)

Sport
- Country: Japan
- Sport: Badminton
- Handedness: Right
- Coached by: Taichi Saito

Men's & mixed doubles
- Highest ranking: 17 (MD with Hiroki Midorikawa, 10 March 2026); 13 (XD with Naru Shinoya, 27 December 2022)
- Current ranking: 24 (MD with Hiroki Okamura, 17 November 2026)
- BWF profile
Medal record
Men's badminton
Representing Japan
World Championships
| Bronze medal – third place | 2021 Huelva | Mixed doubles |
Sudirman Cup
| Bronze medal – third place | 2023 Suzhou | Mixed team |
| Bronze medal – third place | 2025 Xiamen | Mixed team |
Asian Games
| Bronze medal – third place | 2022 Hangzhou | Men's team |
Asian Junior Championships
| Bronze medal – third place | 2016 Bangkok | Mixed team |

Kyohei Yamashita (山下 恭平, Yamashita Kyōhei; born 12 October 1998) is a Japanese badminton player from Okayama Prefecture who competes in men's and mixed doubles. A member of the Japanese national team, he plays for the NTT East team and has reached career-high world rankings of No. 13 in mixed doubles and No. 17 in men's doubles. Yamashita won a bronze medal in mixed doubles at the 2021 World Championships and two Super 300 titles: his maiden BWF World Tour title at the 2026 U.S. Open and the 2026 Canada Open. He has represented Japan in team competitions, winning bronze medals at the 2022 Asian Games and the Sudirman Cup in 2023 and 2025.

== Early career ==
In 2016, Yamashita competed at junior international level, partnering Naoki Yamazawa in boys' doubles. The pair finished as runners-up at the Dutch Junior before winning the German Junior; they faced Hiroki Okamura and Masayuki Onodera in both finals. That year, Yamashita also represented Japan at the Asian Junior Championships in Bangkok, where the team won a bronze medal.

== Career ==
=== 2019–2021: World Championship bronze ===
Yamashita formed a mixed doubles partnership with Naru Shinoya on the BWF World Tour. In 2019, they reached the final of the Akita Masters (Super 100), losing to South Korea's Ko Sung-hyun and Eom Hye-won. That same year, he won the Malaysia International men's doubles title alongside Hiroki Midorikawa.

In 2021, Yamashita and Shinoya made their Super 750 debut at the Indonesia Masters, where they were eliminated in the first round. They subsequently competed in their first Super 1000 tournament at the Indonesia Open, advancing to the second round. Unseeded and ranked world No. 52 at the World Championships in Huelva, Yamashita and Shinoya defeated sixth seeds Marcus Ellis and Lauren Smith in the second round and Robin Tabeling and Selena Piek in the third round. In the quarterfinals, they defeated reigning European champions Rodion Alimov and Alina Davletova, winning five consecutive points after trailing 16–19 in the deciding game to secure a bronze medal. Their run ended in the semifinals with a loss to compatriots Yuta Watanabe and Arisa Higashino.

=== 2022–2023: World top 15 and team medals ===
Yamashita and Shinoya reached a career-high mixed doubles world ranking of 13 in December 2022. Their 2022 season was highlighted by quarterfinal appearances at the Denmark Open and the Australian Open. At the All Japan Championships in December, they finished as runners-up in mixed doubles after losing to Yuki Kaneko and Misaki Matsutomo.

In 2023, Yamashita and Shinoya reached the semifinals of the German Open and the Canada Open, as well as the quarterfinals of the All England Open. Representing Japan at the 2023 Sudirman Cup, Yamashita and Shinoya won all three of their mixed doubles matches, including victories over the world No. 3 pair of Dechapol Puavaranukroh and Sapsiree Taerattanachai in the quarterfinals and Feng Yanzhe and Huang Dongping in the semifinals, helping Japan earn a bronze medal. Yamashita also won a bronze medal in the men's team event at the 2022 Asian Games. In men's doubles, he won the Osaka International with Midorikawa. At the end of the year, Yamashita and Shinoya won their first national mixed doubles title at the All Japan Championships, defeating defending champions Kaneko and Matsutomo.

=== 2024–2025: World top 30 and first Super 500 final ===
Yamashita competing at the 2025 Taipei Open.

Yamashita and Shinoya began the year pursuing qualification for the 2024 Paris Olympics in mixed doubles. The pair did not qualify, and their partnership ended in April when Shinoya retired from the national team. Yamashita then resumed his men's doubles partnership with Midorikawa. They won consecutive titles at the Sydney International and the North Harbour International. Domestically, the duo won three major titles that year: the Japan Ranking Circuit, the All Japan Members Championships, and the All Japan Championships.

In 2025, Yamashita and Midorikawa reached the semifinals of the Swiss Open, having defeated the world No. 2 pair Goh Sze Fei and Nur Izzuddin in the first round, and also advanced to the semifinals at the Taipei Open. Yamashita also won another bronze medal with the Japanese team at the Sudirman Cup. The pair reached a career-high men's doubles ranking of 25 in September 2025 and finished the season as runners-up at the Super 500 Japan Masters, losing the final to South Korea's Kim Won-ho and Seo Seung-jae. In December, they retained their All Japan Championships men's doubles title.

=== 2026: Maiden World Tour titles ===
Yamashita (left) and Hiroki Okamura, the 2026 Canada Open men's doubles champions.

In January, Yamashita and Midorikawa reached their first Super 750 final at the India Open, defeating the world No. 3 pair of Satwiksairaj Rankireddy and Chirag Shetty in the second round and the world No. 2 pair of Aaron Chia and Soh Wooi Yik in the semifinals before finishing as runners-up to Liang Weikeng and Wang Chang. Yamashita and Midorikawa played their final tournament together at the Indonesia Masters, where they were eliminated in the second round. They subsequently declined selection to Japan's 2026 national team. Yamashita and Midorikawa reached a career-high world ranking of No. 17 on 10 March.

Yamashita then formed a new partnership with Hiroki Okamura, a former junior rival. In their second tournament together, they finished as runners-up at the Super 300 Orléans Masters in March. In June, Yamashita secured his maiden BWF World Tour title by winning the Super 300 U.S. Open, defeating reigning European champions Ben Lane and Sean Vendy in the semifinals before beating Chen Zhi-ray and Lin Yu-chieh in the final. In July, Yamashita and Okamura won a second consecutive Super 300 title at the Canada Open, defeating Christian Faust Kjær and Rasmus Kjær in the final.

At the Japan Masters, Yamashita and Okamura defeated second seeds Fajar Alfian and Muhammad Shohibul Fikri in the first round.

== Achievements ==
=== World Championships ===
Mixed doubles
| Year | Venue | Partner | Opponent | Score | Result | Ref. |
|---|---|---|---|---|---|---|
| 2021 | Palacio de los Deportes Carolina Marín; Huelva, Spain | (Japan) Naru Shinoya | (Japan) Yuta Watanabe (Japan) Arisa Higashino | 13–21, 8–21 | Bronze | |

=== BWF World Tour (2 titles, 4 runners-up) ===
The BWF World Tour, which was announced on 19 March 2017 and implemented in 2018, is a series of elite badminton tournaments sanctioned by the Badminton World Federation (BWF). The BWF World Tour is divided into levels of World Tour Finals, Super 1000, Super 750, Super 500, Super 300 (part of the HSBC World Tour), and the BWF Tour Super 100.

Men's doubles
| Year | Tournament | Level | Partner | Opponent | Score | Result | Ref. |
|---|---|---|---|---|---|---|---|
| 2025 | Japan Masters | Super 500 | (Japan) Hiroki Midorikawa | (South Korea) Kim Won-ho (South Korea) Seo Seung-jae | 22–20, 11–21, 16–21 | (silver) Runner-up | |
| 2026 | India Open | Super 750 | (Japan) Hiroki Midorikawa | (China) Liang Weikeng (China) Wang Chang | 21–17, 23–25, 16–21 | (silver) Runner-up | |
| 2026 | Orléans Masters | Super 300 | (Japan) Hiroki Okamura | (China) Hu Keyuan (China) Lin Xiangyi | 19–21, 14–21 | (silver) Runner-up | |
| 2026 | U.S. Open | Super 300 | (Japan) Hiroki Okamura | (Chinese Taipei) Chen Zhi-ray (Chinese Taipei) Lin Yu-chieh | 21–18, 16–21, 21–16 | (gold) Winner | |
| 2026 | Canada Open | Super 300 | (Japan) Hiroki Okamura | (Denmark) Christian Faust Kjær (Denmark) Rasmus Kjær | 13–21, 21–10, 21–17 | (gold) Winner | |

Mixed doubles
| Year | Tournament | Level | Partner | Opponent | Score | Result | Ref. |
|---|---|---|---|---|---|---|---|
| 2019 | Akita Masters | Super 100 | (Japan) Naru Shinoya | (South Korea) Ko Sung-hyun (South Korea) Eom Hye-won | 10–21, 17–21 | (silver) Runner-up | |

=== BWF International Challenge/Series (4 titles) ===
Men's doubles
| Year | Tournament | Partner | Opponent | Score | Result | Ref. |
|---|---|---|---|---|---|---|
| 2019 | Malaysia International | (Japan) Hiroki Midorikawa | (China) Liang Weikeng (China) Shang Yichen | 18–21, 21–10, 21–16 | (gold) Winner | |
| 2023 | Osaka International | (Japan) Hiroki Midorikawa | (Chinese Taipei) Wei Chun-wei (Chinese Taipei) Wu Guan-xun | 21–14, 21–14 | (gold) Winner | |
| 2024 | Sydney International | (Japan) Hiroki Midorikawa | (Chinese Taipei) Lai Po-yu (Chinese Taipei) Tsai Fu-cheng | 21–14, 21–16 | (gold) Winner | |
| 2024 | North Harbour International | (Japan) Hiroki Midorikawa | (Chinese Taipei) Lai Po-yu (Chinese Taipei) Tsai Fu-cheng | 16–21, 21–14, 21–14 | (gold) Winner | |

BWF International Challenge tournament

=== BWF Junior International (1 title, 1 runner-up) ===
Boys' doubles
| Year | Tournament | Partner | Opponent | Score | Result | Ref. |
|---|---|---|---|---|---|---|
| 2016 | Dutch Junior | (Japan) Naoki Yamazawa | (Japan) Hiroki Okamura (Japan) Masayuki Onodera | 21–17, 11–21, 20–22 | (silver) Runner-up | |
| 2016 | German Junior | (Japan) Naoki Yamazawa | (Japan) Hiroki Okamura (Japan) Masayuki Onodera | 21–14, 21–19 | (gold) Winner | |

BWF Junior International Grand Prix tournament

== Performance timeline ==
Key

| W | Won | F | Finalist | SF | Semi-finalist |
| QF | Quarter-finalist | #R | Rounds 4, 3, 2, 1 | RR | Round-robin stage |
| Q# | Qualification round | A | Absent | w/d | Withdrew |
| G | Gold | S | Silver | B | Bronze |
| NH | Not held | N/A | Not applicable | DNQ | Did not qualify |

=== National team ===
- Junior level

| Team events | 2016 | Ref. |
|---|---|---|
| Asian Junior Championships | B | |

- Senior level

| Team events | 2022 | 2023 | 2024 | 2025 | 2026 | Ref. |
|---|---|---|---|---|---|---|
| Asian Games | B | NH | | | A | |
| Sudirman Cup | NH | B | NH | B | NH | |

=== Individual competitions ===
==== Senior level ====
===== Men's doubles =====
| Tournament | BWF World Tour | | | | | | Best | Ref. |
| Tournament | 2018 | 2019 | 2023 | 2024 | 2025 | 2026 | Best | Ref. |
|---|---|---|---|---|---|---|---|---|
| Malaysia Open | A | | | | | 2R | 2R ('26) | |
| India Open | A | | | | | F | F ('26) | |
| Indonesia Masters | A | | | | QF | 2R | QF ('25) | |
| Swiss Open | A | | | | SF | 2R | SF ('25) | |
| Orléans Masters | A | | | | 2R | F | F ('26) | |
| Thailand Open | A | | | | 2R | 1R | 2R ('25) | |
| Baoji China Masters | N/A | | | QF | A | | QF ('24) | |
| Malaysia Masters | A | | | | 2R | A | 2R ('25) | |
| Singapore Open | A | | | | 1R | A | 1R ('25) | |
| Indonesia Open | A | | | | 1R | A | 1R ('25) | |
| Australian Open | A | | | | 1R | A | 1R ('25) | |
| U.S. Open | A | | | | | W | W ('26) | |
| Canada Open | A | | | | | W | W ('26) | |
| Japan Open | A | | | | 2R | A | 2R ('25) | |
| Taipei Open | A | | | | SF | SF | SF ('25, '26) | |
| China Masters | A | | | | 1R | 1R | 1R ('25, '26) | |
| Arctic Open | N/A | | A | | | 1R | 1R ('26) | |
| Denmark Open | A | | | | 1R | QF | QF ('26) | |
| French Open | A | | | | 1R | 1R | 1R ('25, '26) | |
| Korea Open | A | | | | 2R | 2R | 2R ('25, '26) | |
| Japan Masters | N/A | | A | | F | QF | F ('25) | |
| Hong Kong Open | A | | | | 1R | 1R | 1R ('25, '26) | |
| Syed Modi International | A | | 1R | A | | | 1R ('23) | |
| Indonesia Masters Super 100 | A | 1R | A | | | | 1R ('19) | |
| Akita Masters | QF | A | N/A | | | | QF ('18) | |
| Year-end ranking | 265 | 214 | 211 | 131 | 26 | | 26 | |
| Tournament | 2018 | 2019 | 2023 | 2024 | 2025 | 2026 | Best | Ref. |

===== Mixed doubles =====
| Event | 2021 | 2022 | 2023 | 2024 | Ref. |
|---|---|---|---|---|---|
| Asian Championships | NH | QF | 1R | 1R | |
| Asian Games | NH | 1R | NH | | |
| World Championships | B | 3R | 2R | NH | |

| Tournament | BWF World Tour | | | | | | Best | Ref. |
| Tournament | 2019 | 2020 | 2021 | 2022 | 2023 | 2024 | Best | Ref. |
|---|---|---|---|---|---|---|---|---|
| Malaysia Open | A | NH | | 1R | 1R | 2R | 2R ('24) | |
| India Open | A | NH | | A | QF | 1R | QF ('23) | |
| Indonesia Masters | A | | 1R | A | 2R | 2R | 2R ('23,'24) | |
| Thailand Masters | A | 2R | NH | | A | QF | QF ('24) | |
| German Open | A | NH | | 1R | SF | A | SF ('23) | |
| French Open | A | NH | A | 2R | 2R | 1R | 2R ('22,'23) | |
| All England Open | A | | | 1R | QF | 1R | QF ('23) | |
| Swiss Open | A | NH | A | 1R | 2R | A | 2R ('23) | |
| Thailand Open | A | | NH | QF | A | | QF ('22) | |
| Malaysia Masters | A | | NH | 1R | QF | A | QF ('23) | |
| Singapore Open | A | NH | | A | 1R | A | 1R ('23) | |
| Indonesia Open | A | | 2R | 1R | 1R | A | 2R ('21) | |
| Australian Open | A | NH | | QF | QF | A | QF ('22,'23) | |
| Canada Open | A | NH | | A | SF | A | SF ('23) | |
| Japan Open | A | NH | | 1R | 1R | A | 1R ('22,'23) | |
| Korea Open | A | NH | | A | 1R | A | 1R ('23) | |
| Hong Kong Open | A | NH | | | 1R | A | 1R ('23) | |
| Vietnam Open | 2R | NH | | A | | | 2R ('19) | |
| China Open | A | NH | | | 2R | A | 2R ('23) | |
| Denmark Open | A | | | QF | 1R | A | QF ('22) | |
| Japan Masters | N/A | | | | QF | A | QF ('23) | |
| China Masters | A | NH | | | 2R | A | 2R ('23) | |
| Syed Modi International | A | NH | | A | QF | A | QF ('23) | |
| Indonesia Masters Super 100 | 1R | NH | | A | | | 1R ('19) | |
| Akita Masters | F | NH | | | N/A | | F ('19) | |
| Year-end ranking | 73 | 73 | 42 | 13 | 17 | 60 | 13 | |
| Tournament | 2019 | 2020 | 2021 | 2022 | 2023 | 2024 | Best | Ref. |

== Record against selected opponents ==
Record against year-end Finals finalists, World Championships semi-finalists, and Olympic quarter-finalists. Accurate as of 17 November 2026.

=== Naru Shinoya ===
| Players | M | W | L | Diff. |
|---|---|---|---|---|
| (China) Feng Yanzhe & Huang Dongping | 5 | 1 | 4 | –3 |
| (China) Jiang Zhenbang & Wei Yaxin | 2 | 0 | 2 | –2 |
| (China) Zheng Siwei & Huang Yaqiong | 2 | 0 | 2 | –2 |
| (England) Marcus Ellis & Lauren Smith | 3 | 3 | 0 | +3 |
| (France) Thom Gicquel & Delphine Delrue | 1 | 0 | 1 | –1 |
| (Germany) Mark Lamsfuß & Isabel Lohau | 3 | 3 | 0 | +3 |
| (Hong Kong) Tang Chun Man & Tse Ying Suet | 3 | 1 | 2 | –1 |

| Players | M | W | L | Diff. |
|---|---|---|---|---|
| (Indonesia) Praveen Jordan & Melati Daeva Oktavianti | 2 | 0 | 2 | –2 |
| (Japan) Yuta Watanabe & Arisa Higashino | 3 | 0 | 3 | –3 |
| (Malaysia) Chen Tang Jie & Toh Ee Wei | 1 | 0 | 1 | –1 |
| (South Korea) Kim Won-ho & Jeong Na-eun | 8 | 1 | 7 | –6 |
| (South Korea) Seo Seung-jae & Chae Yoo-jung | 2 | 0 | 2 | –2 |
| (Thailand) Dechapol Puavaranukroh & Sapsiree Taerattanachai | 3 | 1 | 2 | –1 |

=== Hiroki Midorikawa ===
| Players | M | W | L | Diff. |
|---|---|---|---|---|
| (China) Chen Boyang & Liu Yi | 2 | 0 | 2 | –2 |
| (China) Liang Weikeng & Wang Chang | 1 | 0 | 1 | –1 |
| (Chinese Taipei) Lee Jhe-huei & Yang Po-hsuan | 1 | 0 | 1 | –1 |
| (India) Satwiksairaj Rankireddy & Chirag Shetty | 1 | 1 | 0 | +1 |

| Players | M | W | L | Diff. |
|---|---|---|---|---|
| (Malaysia) Aaron Chia & Soh Wooi Yik | 2 | 1 | 1 | 0 |
| (Malaysia) Goh Sze Fei & Nur Izzuddin | 3 | 2 | 1 | +1 |
| (Malaysia) Ong Yew Sin & Teo Ee Yi | 1 | 1 | 0 | +1 |
| (South Korea) Kim Won-ho & Seo Seung-jae | 3 | 0 | 3 | –3 |

=== Hiroki Okamura ===
| Players | M | W | L | Diff. |
|---|---|---|---|---|
| (China) Liang Weikeng & Wang Chang | 1 | 0 | 1 | –1 |
| (India) Satwiksairaj Rankireddy & Chirag Shetty | 1 | 0 | 1 | –1 |
| (Malaysia) Aaron Chia & Soh Wooi Yik | 1 | 0 | 1 | –1 |
| (Malaysia) Goh Sze Fei & Nur Izzuddin | 1 | 0 | 1 | –1 |
