= 2025 BWF World Tour Finals =

2025 badminton tournament in Hangzhou, China

Tournament details
- Dates: 17–21 December
- Edition: 8th
- Level: World Tour Finals
- Total prize money: US$3,000,000
- Venue: Hangzhou Olympic Sports Centre Gymnasium
- Location: Hangzhou, China

Champions
- Men's singles: (France) Christo Popov
- Women's singles: (South Korea) An Se-young
- Men's doubles: (South Korea) Kim Won-ho (South Korea) Seo Seung-jae
- Women's doubles: (South Korea) Baek Ha-na (South Korea) Lee So-hee
- Mixed doubles: (China) Feng Yanzhe (China) Huang Dongping

The 2025 BWF World Tour Finals (officially was the HSBC BWF World Tour Finals 2025 for sponsorship reasons) was the final tournament of the 2025 BWF World Tour. It has been held from 17 to 21 December 2025 in Hangzhou, China and features a total prize pool of $3,000,000.

== Tournament ==
The 2025 BWF World Tour was the eighth edition of the BWF World Tour Finals and was organized by the Chinese Badminton Association with sanction from the BWF.

=== Point distribution ===
Below is the point distribution table for each phase of the tournament based on the BWF points system for the BWF World Tour Finals event.

Winner(s)	Runner(s)-up	Semi-finalists	3rd in group	4th in group
14,000	12,000	10,000	8,900	7,800

=== Prize money ===
The total prize money for this year's tournament is US$3,000,000. Distribution of prize money was in accordance with BWF regulations.

Achievement	Winner(s)	Runner(s)-up	Semi-finalist(s)	3rd in group	4th in group
Singles	$240,000	$120,000	$60,000	$33,000	$18,000
Doubles	$252,000	$120,000	$60,000	$39,000	$21,000

== Players ==
Below are the eligible players for World Tour Finals. The top eight players, or pairs in doubles categories, in the BWF World Ranking are eligible to play in the tournament, with a maximum of two players or pairs representing each national member association.

=== Men's singles ===
Seeds	Rank	NOCs	Players	Performances		
Seeds	Rank	NOCs	Players	Winner	Runner-up	Semifinalists
1	1	Thailand (1)	Kunlavut Vitidsarn	3 Super 750: Singapore Open; Super 500: Indonesia Masters, Thailand Open	1 Super 500: Arctic Open	2 Super 1000: Indonesia Open; Super 750: French Open
2	2	China (1)	Li Shifeng	2 Super 500: Malaysia Masters, Hong Kong Open		4 Super 1000: Malaysia Open, All England Open; Super 750: French Open; Super 300: Swiss Open
3/4	3	Chinese Taipei (1)	Chou Tien-chen	1 Super 500: Arctic Open	2 Super 1000: Indonesia Open; Super 300: Taipei Open	7 Super 1000: China Open; Super 750: French Open; Super 500: Korea Open, Hong Kong Open, Australian Open; Super 300: Swiss Open, U.S. Open
3/4	4	Denmark (1)	Anders Antonsen	2 Super 1000: Indonesia Open; Super 750: French Open	3 Super 1000: Malaysia Open; Super 500: Thailand Open, Korea Open	2 Super 1000: China Open; Super 750: China Masters
5/8	5	France (1)	Christo Popov		2 Super 750: French Open; Super 300: Swiss Open	4 Super 750: Singapore Open, Japan Open, China Masters; Super 500: Hong Kong Open
5/8	6	Indonesia (1)	Jonatan Christie	3 Super 750: Denmark Open; Super 500: Korea Open, Hylo Open	1 Super 500: Indonesia Masters	2 Super 750: India Open; Super 300: Orléans Masters
5/8	7	China (2)	Shi Yuqi	4 Super 1000: Malaysia Open, All England Open, China Open; Super 750: Japan Open	1 Super 750: Denmark Open	2 Super 1000: Indonesia Open; Super 500: Indonesia Masters
5/8	8	Japan (1)	Kodai Naraoka	1 Super 500: Japan Masters		3 Super 1000: Malaysia Open; Super 500: Malaysia Masters; Super 300: Canada Open

=== Women's singles ===
Seeds	Rank	NOCs	Players	Performances		
Seeds	Rank	NOCs	Players	Winner	Runner-up	Semifinalists
1	1	South Korea (1)	An Se-young	10; Super 1000: Malaysia Open, All England Open, Indonesia Open; Super 750: India Open, Japan Open, China Masters, Denmark Open, French Open; Super 500:Australian Open; Super 300: Orléans Masters	1 Super 500: Korea Open	1 Super 1000: China Open
2	2	China (1)	Wang Zhiyi	3 Super 1000: China Open; Super 500: Malaysia Masters, Hong Kong Open	7 Super 1000: Malaysia Open, All England Open, Indonesia Open; Super 750: Singapore Open, Japan Open, Denmark Open, French Open	
3/4	3	China (2)	Han Yue		3 Super 750: China Masters; Super 500: Malaysia Masters, Hong Kong Open	8 Super 1000: All England Open, Indonesia Open, China Open; Super 750: Singapore Open, Japan Open, China Masters, Denmark Open; Super 500: Malaysia Masters
3/4	4	Japan (1)	Akane Yamaguchi	2 Super 500: Korea Open, Arctic Open		8 Super 1000: All England Open, Indonesia Open, China Open; Super 750: Singapore Open, Japan Open, China Masters, Denmark Open; Super 500: Malaysia Masters
5/8	5	Indonesia (1)	Putri Kusuma Wardani		2 Super 500: Hylo Open, Australian Open	3 Super 500: Korea Open; Super 300: Thailand Masters, Swiss Open
5/8	6	Thailand (1)	Pornpawee Chochuwong	1 Super 300: Thailand Masters	2 Super 750: India Open; Super 500: Thailand Open	1 Super 500: Korea Open
5/8	7	Thailand (2)	Ratchanok Intanon	2 Super 500: Indonesia Masters, Japan Masters		3 Super 1000: Malaysia Open; Super 500: Arctic Open, Australian Open
5/8	8	Japan (2)	Tomoka Miyazaki	1 Super 300: Taipei Open		2 Super 750: India Open; Super 500: Thailand Open

=== Men's doubles ===
Seeds	Rank	NOCs	Players	Performances		
Seeds	Rank	NOCs	Players	Winner	Runner-up	Semifinalists
1	1	South Korea (1)	Kim Won-ho; Seo Seung-jae	9 Super 1000: Malaysia Open, All England Open, Indonesia Open; Super 750:Japan Open, China Masters, French Open; Super 500: Korea Open, Japan Masters; Super 300: German Open	2 Super 750: India Open, Singapore Open	1 Super 300: Orléans Masters
2	2	Malaysia (1)	Aaron Chia; Soh Wooi Yik	2 Super 750: Singapore Open; Super 500: Thailand Open	3 Super 1000: China Open; Super 500: Malaysia Masters, Arctic Open	5 Super 1000: China Open; Super 750: India Open, China Masters, French Open; Super 500: Indonesia Masters
3/4	3	India (1)	Satwiksairaj Rankireddy; Chirag Shetty		2 Super 750: China Masters; Super 500: Hong Kong Open	5 Super 1000: Malaysia Open, China Open; Super 750: India Open, Singapore Open, Denmark Open
3/4	4	Malaysia (2)	Man Wei Chong; Tee Kai Wun	2 Super 500: Indonesia Masters, Malaysia Masters		4 Super 1000: Malaysia Open, Indonesia Open; Super 500:Hylo Open
5/8	5	Indonesia (1)	Sabar Karyaman Gutama; Muhammad Reza Pahlevi Isfahani		3 Super 1000: Indonesia Open; Super 500: Hylo Open; Super 300: Macau Open	2 Super 1000: All England Open; Super 500: Australian Open
5/8	6	China (1)	Liang Weikeng; Wang Chang	1 Super 500: Hong Kong Open	1 Super 300: Orléans Masters	2 Super 1000: China Open; Super 750: Denmark Open
5/8	7	Chinese Taipei (1)	Chiu Hsiang-chieh; Wang Chi-lin	2 Super 500: Hylo Open; Super 300: Taipei Open		1 Super 500: Japan Masters
5/8	8	Indonesia (2)	Fajar Alfian; Muhammad Shohibul Fikri	1 Super 1000: China Open	4 Super 750: Denmark Open, French Open; Super 500: Korea Open, Australian Open	1 Super 750: China Masters

=== Women's doubles ===
Seeds	Rank	NOCs	Players	Performances		
Seeds	Rank	NOCs	Players	Winner	Runner-up	Semifinalists
1	1	Malaysia (1)	Pearly Tan; Thinaah Muralitharan	3 Super 500: Thailand Open, Arctic Open, Japan Masters	3 Super 1000: Indonesia Open; Super 750: Japan Open; Super 500: Indonesia Masters	4 Super 1000: China Open; Super 750: India Open; Malaysia Masters, Hong Kong Open
2	2	South Korea (1)	Kim Hye-jeong; Kong Hee-yong	4 Super 750: Singapore Open; Super 500: Indonesia Masters, Korea Open; Super 300: Orléans Masters	3 Super 750: India Open, China Masters, Denmark Open	1 Super 1000: China Open
3/4	3	China (1)	Liu Shengshu; Tan Ning	4 Super 1000: Indonesia Open, China Open; Super 750: Japan Open; Super 500: Malaysia Masters	1 Super 300: Swiss Open	4 Super 1000: Malaysia Open, All England Open; Super 750: Singapore Open, China Masters
3/4	4	China (2)	Jia Yifan; Zhang Shuxian	3 Super 750: China Masters; Super 500: Hong Kong Open; Super 300: Swiss Open	3 Super 1000: Malaysia Open, China Open; Super 500: Malaysia Masters	5 Super 1000: All England Open; Super 750: Singapore Open, Japan Open; Super 500: Indonesia Masters; Super 300: Orléans Masters
5/8	5	Japan (1)	Yuki Fukushima; Mayu Matsumoto	2 Super 1000: Malaysia Open; Super 750: French Open	1 Super 1000: All England Open	4 Super 750: Denmark Open; Super 500: Korea Open, Kumamoto Masters; Super 300: Orléans Masters
5/8	6	South Korea (2)	Baek Ha-na; Lee So-hee	1 Super 750: Denmark Open	1 Super 300: Orléans Masters	3 Super 1000: Indonesia Open; Super 750: China Masters; Super 500: Korea Open
5/8	7	Japan (2)	Rin Iwanaga; Kie Nakanishi		5 Super 750: Singapore Open; Super 500: Hong Kong Open, Korea Open, Arctic Open, Japan Masters	
5/8	8	Chinese Taipei (1)	Hsieh Pei-shan; Hung En-tzu	2 Super 300: Taipei Open, Macau Open		1 Super 500: Arctic Open

=== Mixed doubles ===
Seeds	Rank	NOCs	Players	Performances		
Seeds	Rank	NOCs	Players	Winner	Runner-up	Semifinalists
1	1	Thailand (1)	Dechapol Puavaranukroh; Supissara Paewsampran	5 Super 1000: Malaysia Open; Super 750: Singapore Open, China Masters; Super 500: Kumamoto Masters; Super 300: Thailand Masters	3 Super 1000: Indonesia Open; Super 750: Japan Open, French Open	3 Super 500: Indonesia Masters, Arctic Open
2	2	China (1)	Feng Yanzhe; Huang Dongping	7 Super 1000: China Open; Super 750: Denmark Open, French Open; Super 500: Thailand Open, Malaysia Masters, Hong Kong Open, Korea Open	2 Super 1000: Malaysia Open; Super 500: Arctic Open	2 Super 750: Japan Open, China Masters
3/4	3	Malaysia (1)	Chen Tang Jie; Toh Ee Wei	1 Super 500: Australian Open	2 Super 750: China Masters	6 Super 1000: Malaysia Open, Indonesia Open; Super 750: India Open, Japan Open, Denmark Open; Super 300: Macau Open
3/4	4	China (2)	Jiang Zhenbang; Wei Yaxin	3 Super 750: India Open, Japan Open; Super 500: Arctic Open	4 Super 1000: China Open; Super 750: Denmark Open; Malaysia Masters, Korea Open	1 Super 750: China Masters
5/8	5	Malaysia (2)	Goh Soon Huat; Shevon Jemie Lai			2 Super 1000: Malaysia Open; Super 750: India Open
5/8	6	France (1)	Thom Gicquel; Delphine Delrue	1 Super 1000: Indonesia Open	3 Super 750: India Open; Super 500: Hylo Open, Japan Masters	
5/8	7	Japan (1)	Hiroki Midorikawa; Natsu Saito	1 Super 500: Indonesia Masters		
5/8	8	Indonesia (1)	Jafar Hidayatullah; Felisha Pasaribu	1 Super 300: Taipei Open	1 Super 500: Australian Open	2 Super 1000: China Open; Super 300:Thailand Masters

== Representatives by nation ==
Top Nation
Rank	Nation	MS	WS	MD	WD	XD	Total	Players
1	China (H)	2	2	1	2	2	9	14
2	Japan	1	2		2	1	6	9
3	Indonesia	1	1	2		1	5	8
3	Malaysia			2	1	2	5	10
4	South Korea		1	1	2		4	7
4	Thailand	1	2			1	4	5
5	Chinese Taipei	1		1	1		3	5
6	France	1				1	2	3
7	Denmark	1					1	1
7	India			1			1	2
Total		8	8	8	8	8	40	64

== Performance by nation ==
Nation	Group stage	Semi-finals	Final	Winner(s)
South Korea	4	3	3	3
China (H)	9	6	5	1
France	2	1	1	1
Japan	6	4	1	
Malaysia	5	2		
Thailand	4	2		
Indonesia	5	1		
India	1	1		
Chinese Taipei	3			
Denmark	1			
Total	40	20	10	5

== Men's singles ==
=== Seeds ===
1. (Thailand) Kunlavut Vitidsarn (semi-finals)
2. (China) Li Shifeng (withdrew)
3. (Chinese Taipei) Chou Tien-chen (group stage)
4. (Denmark) Anders Antonsen (group stage)

=== Group A ===
Rank	Players	Pld	W	L	GF	GA	GD	PF	PA	PD	Pts	Qualification
1	(France) Christo Popov	3	3	0	6	3	+3	174	145	+29	3	Advance to semi-finals
2	(Thailand) Kunlavut Vitidsarn	3	2	1	5	3	+2	144	133	+11	2	Advance to semi-finals
3	(Denmark) Anders Antonsen	3	1	2	4	4	0	144	144	0	1	Eliminated
4	(Indonesia) Jonatan Christie	3	0	3	1	6	–5	104	144	–40	0	Eliminated

Date	Player 1	Score	Player 2	Set 1	Set 2	Set 3
17 Dec	Kunlavut Vitidsarn (Thailand)	2–0	(Indonesia) Jonatan Christie	21–10	21–14	
17 Dec	Anders Antonsen (Denmark)	1–2	(France) Christo Popov	13–21	21–12	19–21
18 Dec	Anders Antonsen (Denmark)	2–0	(Indonesia) Jonatan Christie	21–16	21–14	
18 Dec	Kunlavut Vitidsarn (Thailand)	1–2	(France) Christo Popov	11–21	21–18	10–21
19 Dec	Christo Popov (France)	2–1	(Indonesia) Jonatan Christie	18–21	21–16	21–13
19 Dec	Kunlavut Vitidsarn (Thailand)	2–1	(Denmark) Anders Antonsen	21–15	18–21	21–13

=== Group B ===
Rank	Players	Pld	W	L	GF	GA	GD	PF	PA	PD	Pts	Qualification
1	(China) Shi Yuqi	2	2	0	4	1	+3	103	67	+36	2	Advance to semi-finals
2	(Japan) Kodai Naraoka	2	1	1	2	2	0	62	77	–15	1	Advance to semi-finals
3	(Chinese Taipei) Chou Tien-chen	2	0	2	1	4	–3	82	103	–21	0	Eliminated
4	(China) Li Shifeng (Z)	–	–	–	–	–	–	–	–	–	–	Withdrew

(Z) Withdrew due to a right ankle injury

Date	Player 1	Score	Player 2	Set 1	Set 2	Set 3
17 Dec	~~Li Shifeng~~ (China)	~~0–2~~ (voided)	(China) ~~Shi Yuqi~~	~~13–21~~	~~21–23~~	
17 Dec	Chou Tien-chen (Chinese Taipei)	0–2	(Japan) Kodai Naraoka	17–21	18–21	
18 Dec	~~Li Shifeng~~ (China)	~~0–2~~ (voided)	(Japan) ~~Kodai Naraoka~~	~~16–21~~	~~15–21~~	
18 Dec	Chou Tien-chen (Chinese Taipei)	1–2	(China) Shi Yuqi	11–21	21–19	15–21
19 Dec	~~Li Shifeng~~ (China)	~~1–0~~ (voided)	(Chinese Taipei) ~~Chou Tien-chen~~	~~21–14~~	~~14^{r}–11~~	
19 Dec	Shi Yuqi (China)	2–0	(Japan) Kodai Naraoka	21–9	21–11	

=== Finals ===
Semi-finals
(France) Christo Popov	21	21
(Japan) Kodai Naraoka	19	8
1	(Thailand) Kunlavut Vitidsarn	16	13
(China) Shi Yuqi	21	21

Final
(France) Christo Popov	21	21
(China) Shi Yuqi	19	9

== Women's singles ==
=== Seeds ===
1. (South Korea) An Se-young (champion)
2. (China) Wang Zhiyi (final)
3. (China) Han Yue (group stage)
4. (Japan) Akane Yamaguchi (semi-finals)

=== Group A ===
Rank	Players	Pld	W	L	GF	GA	GD	PF	PA	PD	Pts	Qualification
1	(South Korea) An Se-young	3	3	0	6	2	+4	148	100	+48	3	Advance to semi-finals
2	(Japan) Akane Yamaguchi	3	2	1	5	3	+2	146	143	+3	2	Advance to semi-finals
3	(Indonesia) Putri Kusuma Wardani	3	1	2	4	4	0	143	140	+3	1	Eliminated
4	(Japan) Tomoka Miyazaki	3	0	3	0	6	–6	72	126	–54	0	Eliminated

Date	Player 1	Score	Player 2	Set 1	Set 2	Set 3
17 Dec	An Se-young (South Korea)	2–1	(Indonesia) Putri Kusuma Wardani	21–16	8–21	21–8
17 Dec	Akane Yamaguchi (Japan)	2–0	(Japan) Tomoka Miyazaki	21–14	21–17	
18 Dec	Akane Yamaguchi (Japan)	2–1	(Indonesia) Putri Kusuma Wardani	22–24	21–19	21–13
18 Dec	An Se-young (South Korea)	2–0	(Japan) Tomoka Miyazaki	21–9	21–6	
19 Dec	Putri Kusuma Wardani (Indonesia)	2–0	(Japan) Tomoka Miyazaki	21–17	21–9	
19 Dec	An Se-young (South Korea)	2–1	(Japan) Akane Yamaguchi	14–21	21–5	21–14

=== Group B ===
Rank	Players	Pld	W	L	GF	GA	GD	PF	PA	PD	Pts	Qualification
1	(China) Wang Zhiyi	2	2	0	4	0	+4	84	55	+29	2	Advance to semi-finals
2	(Thailand) Ratchanok Intanon	2	1	1	2	2	0	78	69	+9	1	Advance to semi-finals
3	(China) Han Yue	2	0	2	0	4	–4	19	42	–23	0	Eliminated
4	(Thailand) Pornpawee Chochuwong (Z)	–	–	–	–	–	–	–	–	–	–	Withdrew

(Z) Withdrew due to a left calf injury

Date	Player 1	Score	Player 2	Set 1	Set 2	Set 3
17 Dec	Wang Zhiyi (China)	2–0	(China) Han Yue	21–14	21–5	
17 Dec	~~Pornpawee Chochuwong~~ (Thailand)	~~2–1~~ (voided)	(Thailand) ~~Ratchanok Intanon~~	~~21–18~~	~~14–21~~	~~21–10~~
18 Dec	Wang Zhiyi (China)	2–0	(Thailand) Ratchanok Intanon	21–17	21–19	
18 Dec	Han Yue (China)	N/P	(Thailand) Pornpawee Chochuwong	Cancelled		
19 Dec	Han Yue (China)	0–2	(Thailand) Ratchanok Intanon	17–21	10–21	
19 Dec	Wang Zhiyi (China)	N/P	(Thailand) Pornpawee Chochuwong	Cancelled		

=== Finals ===
Semi-finals
1	(South Korea) An Se-young	21	21
4	(Japan) Akane Yamaguchi	15	12
(Thailand) Ratchanok Intanon	21	17	11
2	(China) Wang Zhiyi	15	21	21

Final
1	(South Korea) An Se-young	21	18	21
2	(China) Wang Zhiyi	13	21	10

== Men's doubles ==
=== Seeds ===
1. (South Korea) Kim Won-ho / Seo Seung-jae (champions)
2. (Malaysia) Aaron Chia / Soh Wooi Yik (group stage)
3. (India) Satwiksairaj Rankireddy / Chirag Shetty (semi-finals)
4. (Malaysia) Man Wei Chong / Tee Kai Wun (group stage)

=== Group A ===
Rank	Players	Pld	W	L	GF	GA	GD	PF	PA	PD	Pts	Qualification
1	(South Korea) Kim Won-ho (South Korea) Seo Seung-jae	3	3	0	6	2	+4	168	158	+10	3	Advance to semi-finals
2	(Indonesia) Sabar Karyaman Gutama (Indonesia) Muhammad Reza Pahlevi Isfahani	3	2	1	4	3	+1	143	139	+4	2	Advance to semi-finals
3	(Malaysia) Man Wei Chong (Malaysia) Tee Kai Wun	3	1	2	3	4	–1	145	141	+4	1	Eliminated
4	(Chinese Taipei) Chiu Hsiang-chieh (Chinese Taipei) Wang Chi-lin	3	0	3	2	6	–4	151	169	–18	0	Eliminated

Date	Player 1	Score	Player 2	Set 1	Set 2	Set 3
17 Dec	Man Wei Chong (Malaysia); Tee Kai Wun (Malaysia)	0–2	(Indonesia) Sabar Karyaman Gutama (Indonesia) Muhammad Reza Pahlevi Isfahani	21–23	19–21	
17 Dec	Kim Won-ho (South Korea); Seo Seung-jae (South Korea)	2–1	(Chinese Taipei) Chiu Hsiang-chieh (Chinese Taipei) Wang Chi-lin	21–19	23–25	21–14
18 Dec	Kim Won-ho (South Korea); Seo Seung-jae (South Korea)	2–0	(Indonesia) Sabar Karyaman Gutama (Indonesia) Muhammad Reza Pahlevi Isfahani	22–20	21–17	
18 Dec	Man Wei Chong (Malaysia); Tee Kai Wun (Malaysia)	2–0	(Chinese Taipei) Chiu Hsiang-chieh (Chinese Taipei) Wang Chi-lin	21–18	21–19	
19 Dec	Chiu Hsiang-chieh (Chinese Taipei); Wang Chi-lin (Chinese Taipei)	1–2	(Indonesia) Sabar Karyaman Gutama (Indonesia) Muhammad Reza Pahlevi Isfahani	19–21	22–20	15–21
19 Dec	Kim Won-ho (South Korea); Seo Seung-jae (South Korea)	2–1	(Malaysia) Man Wei Chong (Malaysia) Tee Kai Wun	25–23	14–21	21–19

=== Group B ===
Rank	Players	Pld	W	L	GF	GA	GD	PF	PA	PD	Pts	Qualification
1	(India) Satwiksairaj Rankireddy (India) Chirag Shetty	3	3	0	6	3	+3	172	152	+20	3	Advance to semi-finals
2	(China) Liang Weikeng (China) Wang Chang	3	2	1	5	2	+3	139	118	+21	2	Advance to semi-finals
3	(Malaysia) Aaron Chia (Malaysia) Soh Wooi Yik	3	1	2	3	5	–2	150	162	–12	1	Eliminated
4	(Indonesia) Fajar Alfian (Indonesia) Muhammad Shohibul Fikri	3	0	3	2	6	–4	135	164	–29	0	Eliminated

Date	Player 1	Score	Player 2	Set 1	Set 2	Set 3
17 Dec	Satwiksairaj Rankireddy (India); Chirag Shetty (India)	2–1	(China) Liang Weikeng (China) Wang Chang	12–21	22–20	21–14
17 Dec	Aaron Chia (Malaysia); Soh Wooi Yik (Malaysia)	2–1	(Indonesia) Fajar Alfian (Indonesia) Muhammad Shohibul Fikri	22–24	21–18	21–19
18 Dec	Aaron Chia (Malaysia); Soh Wooi Yik (Malaysia)	0–2	(China) Liang Weikeng (China) Wang Chang	14–21	18–21	
18 Dec	Satwiksairaj Rankireddy (India); Chirag Shetty (India)	2–1	(Indonesia) Fajar Alfian (Indonesia) Muhammad Shohibul Fikri	21–11	16–21	21–11
19 Dec	Liang Weikeng (China); Wang Chang (China)	2–0	(Indonesia) Fajar Alfian (Indonesia) Muhammad Shohibul Fikri	21–17	21–14	
19 Dec	Aaron Chia (Malaysia); Soh Wooi Yik (Malaysia)	1–2	(India) Satwiksairaj Rankireddy (India) Chirag Shetty	21–17	18–21	15–21

=== Finals ===
Semi-finals
1	(South Korea) Kim Won-ho (South Korea) Seo Seung-jae	21	21
(Indonesia) Sabar Karyaman Gutama (Indonesia) Muhammad Reza Pahlevi Isfahani	9	11
(China) Liang Weikeng (China) Wang Chang	10	21	21
3	(India) Satwiksairaj Rankireddy (India) Chirag Shetty	21	17	13

Final
1	(South Korea) Kim Won-ho (South Korea) Seo Seung-jae	21	21
(China) Liang Weikeng (China) Wang Chang	18	14

== Women's doubles ==
=== Seeds ===
1. (Malaysia) Pearly Tan / Thinaah Muralitharan (semi-finals)
2. (South Korea) Kim Hye-jeong / Kong Hee-yong (group stage)
3. (China) Liu Shengshu / Tan Ning (semi-finals)
4. (China) Jia Yifan / Zhang Shuxian (group stage)

=== Group A ===
Rank	Players	Pld	W	L	GF	GA	GD	PF	PA	PD	Pts	Qualification
1	(Malaysia) Pearly Tan (Malaysia) Thinaah Muralitharan	3	2	1	5	2	+3	139	117	+22	2	Advance to semi-finals
2	(Japan) Yuki Fukushima (Japan) Mayu Matsumoto	3	2	1	5	3	+2	156	141	+15	2	Advance to semi-finals
3	(China) Jia Yifan (China) Zhang Shuxian	3	2	1	4	3	+1	128	117	+11	2	Eliminated
4	(Japan) Rin Iwanaga (Japan) Kie Nakanishi	3	0	3	0	6	–6	78	126	–48	0	Eliminated

Date	Player 1	Score	Player 2	Set 1	Set 2	Set 3
17 Dec	Pearly Tan (Malaysia); Thinaah Muralitharan (Malaysia)	2–0	(China) Jia Yifan (China) Zhang Shuxian	21–17	21–11	
17 Dec	Yuki Fukushima (Japan); Mayu Matsumoto (Japan)	2–0	(Japan) Rin Iwanaga (Japan) Kie Nakanishi	21–14	21–14	
18 Dec	Pearly Tan (Malaysia); Thinaah Muralitharan (Malaysia)	2–0	(Japan) Rin Iwanaga (Japan) Kie Nakanishi	21–13	21–18	
18 Dec	Jia Yifan (China); Zhang Shuxian (China)	2–1	(Japan) Yuki Fukushima (Japan) Mayu Matsumoto	21–19	16–21	21–16
19 Dec	Pearly Tan (Malaysia); Thinaah Muralitharan (Malaysia)	1–2	(Japan) Yuki Fukushima (Japan) Mayu Matsumoto	15–21	21–16	19–21
19 Dec	Jia Yifan (China); Zhang Shuxian (China)	2–0	(Japan) Rin Iwanaga (Japan) Kie Nakanishi	21–11	21–8	

=== Group B ===
Rank	Players	Pld	W	L	GF	GA	GD	PF	PA	PD	Pts	Qualification
1	(China) Liu Shengshu (China) Tan Ning	3	3	0	6	0	+6	126	69	+57	3	Advance to semi-finals
2	(South Korea) Baek Ha-na (South Korea) Lee So-hee	3	2	1	4	2	+2	101	105	–4	2	Advance to semi-finals
3	(South Korea) Kim Hye-jeong (South Korea) Kong Hee-yong	3	1	2	2	5	–3	113	125	–12	1	Eliminated
4	(Chinese Taipei) Hsieh Pei-shan (Chinese Taipei) Hung En-tzu	3	0	3	1	6	–5	101	142	–41	0	Eliminated

Date	Player 1	Score	Player 2	Set 1	Set 2	Set 3
17 Dec	Kim Hye-jeong (South Korea); Kong Hee-yong (South Korea)	0–2	(South Korea) Baek Ha-na (South Korea) Lee So-hee	15–21	12–21	
17 Dec	Liu Shengshu (China); Tan Ning (China)	2–0	(Chinese Taipei) Hsieh Pei-shan (Chinese Taipei) Hung En-tzu	21–10	21–14	
18 Dec	Kim Hye-jeong (South Korea); Kong Hee-yong (South Korea)	2–1	(Chinese Taipei) Hsieh Pei-shan (Chinese Taipei) Hung En-tzu	21–7	16–21	21–13
18 Dec	Liu Shengshu (China); Tan Ning (China)	2–0	(South Korea) Baek Ha-na (South Korea) Lee So-hee	21–7	21–10	
19 Dec	Baek Ha-na (South Korea); Lee So-hee (South Korea)	2–0	(Chinese Taipei) Hsieh Pei-shan (Chinese Taipei) Hung En-tzu	21–17	21–19	
19 Dec	Kim Hye-jeong (South Korea); Kong Hee-yong (South Korea)	0–2	(China) Liu Shengshu (China) Tan Ning	17–21	11–21	

=== Finals ===
Semi-finals
1	(Malaysia) Pearly Tan (Malaysia) Thinaah Muralitharan	19	13
(Japan) Yuki Fukushima (Japan) Mayu Matsumoto	21	21
(South Korea) Baek Ha-na (South Korea) Lee So-hee	15	21	21
3	(China) Liu Shengshu (China) Tan Ning	21	16	19

Final
(Japan) Yuki Fukushima (Japan) Mayu Matsumoto	17	11
(South Korea) Baek Ha-na (South Korea) Lee So-hee	21	21

== Mixed doubles ==
=== Seeds ===
1. (Thailand) Dechapol Puavaranukroh / Supissara Paewsampran (group stage)
2. (China) Feng Yanzhe / Huang Dongping (champions)
3. (Malaysia) Chen Tang Jie / Toh Ee Wei (semi-finals)
4. (China) Jiang Zhenbang / Wei Yaxin (final)

=== Group A ===
Rank	Players	Pld	W	L	GF	GA	GD	PF	PA	PD	Pts	Qualification
1	(China) Jiang Zhenbang (China) Wei Yaxin	3	3	0	6	1	+5	142	109	+33	3	Advance to semi-finals
2	(Japan) Hiroki Midorikawa (Japan) Natsu Saito	3	2	1	4	3	+1	138	130	+8	2	Advance to semi-finals
3	(France) Thom Gicquel (France) Delphine Delrue	3	1	2	4	5	–1	161	174	–13	1	Eliminated
4	(Thailand) Dechapol Puavaranukroh (Thailand) Supissara Paewsampran	3	0	3	1	6	–5	112	140	–28	0	Eliminated

Date	Player 1	Score	Player 2	Set 1	Set 2	Set 3
17 Dec	Jiang Zhenbang (China); Wei Yaxin (China)	2–1	(France) Thom Gicquel (France) Delphine Delrue	16–21	21–16	21–17
17 Dec	Dechapol Puavaranukroh (Thailand); Supissara Paewsampran (Thailand)	0–2	(Japan) Hiroki Midorikawa (Japan) Natsu Saito	19–21	18–21	
18 Dec	Dechapol Puavaranukroh (Thailand); Supissara Paewsampran (Thailand)	1–2	(France) Thom Gicquel (France) Delphine Delrue	21–14	14–21	18–21
18 Dec	Jiang Zhenbang (China); Wei Yaxin (China)	2–0	(Japan) Hiroki Midorikawa (Japan) Natsu Saito	21–17	21–16	
19 Dec	Thom Gicquel (France); Delphine Delrue (France)	1–2	(Japan) Hiroki Midorikawa (Japan) Natsu Saito	14–21	23–21	14–21
19 Dec	Dechapol Puavaranukroh (Thailand); Supissara Paewsampran (Thailand)	0–2	(China) Jiang Zhenbang (China) Wei Yaxin	10–21	12–21	

=== Group B ===
Rank	Players	Pld	W	L	GF	GA	GD	PF	PA	PD	Pts	Qualification
1	(China) Feng Yanzhe (China) Huang Dongping	3	3	0	6	1	+5	155	132	+23	3	Advance to semi-finals
2	(Malaysia) Chen Tang Jie (Malaysia) Toh Ee Wei	3	2	1	4	3	+1	143	123	+20	2	Advance to semi-finals
3	(Indonesia) Jafar Hidayatullah (Indonesia) Felisha Pasaribu	3	1	2	3	4	–1	126	135	–9	1	Eliminated
4	(Malaysia) Goh Soon Huat (Malaysia) Shevon Jemie Lai	3	0	3	1	6	–5	116	150	–34	0	Eliminated

Date	Player 1	Score	Player 2	Set 1	Set 2	Set 3
17 Dec	Feng Yanzhe (China); Huang Dongping (China)	2–0	(Indonesia) Jafar Hidayatullah (Indonesia) Felisha Pasaribu	21–18	21–16	
17 Dec	Chen Tang Jie (Malaysia); Toh Ee Wei (Malaysia)	2–0	(Malaysia) Goh Soon Huat (Malaysia) Shevon Jemie Lai	21–13	21–13	
18 Dec	Chen Tang Jie (Malaysia); Toh Ee Wei (Malaysia)	2–1	(Indonesia) Jafar Hidayatullah (Indonesia) Felisha Pasaribu	17–21	21–14	21–15
18 Dec	Feng Yanzhe (China); Huang Dongping (China)	2–1	(Malaysia) Goh Soon Huat (Malaysia) Shevon Jemie Lai	23–25	21–11	22–20
19 Dec	Feng Yanzhe (China); Huang Dongping (China)	2–0	(Malaysia) Chen Tang Jie (Malaysia) Toh Ee Wei	21–18	26–24	
19 Dec	Goh Soon Huat (Malaysia); Shevon Jemie Lai (Malaysia)	0–2	(Indonesia) Jafar Hidayatullah (Indonesia) Felisha Pasaribu	17–21	17–21	

=== Finals ===
Semi-finals
4	(China) Jiang Zhenbang (China) Wei Yaxin	9	21	21
3	(Malaysia) Chen Tang Jie (Malaysia) Toh Ee Wei	21	11	17
(Japan) Hiroki Midorikawa (Japan) Natsu Saito	20	21	9
2	(China) Feng Yanzhe (China) Huang Dongping	22	17	21

Final
4	(China) Jiang Zhenbang (China) Wei Yaxin	12	17
2	(China) Feng Yanzhe (China) Huang Dongping	21	21

Preceded by 2025 Odisha Masters	BWF World Tour; 2025 BWF season	Succeeded by 2026 Malaysia Open
