= 2025 Orléans Masters =

Badminton tournament in France

Tournament details
- Dates: 4–9 March
- Edition: 13th
- Level: Super 300
- Total prize money: US$240,000
- Venue: Palais des Sports
- Location: Orléans, France

Champions
- Men's singles: (France) Alex Lanier
- Women's singles: (South Korea) An Se-young
- Men's doubles: (South Korea) Kang Min-hyuk (South Korea) Ki Dong-ju
- Women's doubles: (South Korea) Kim Hye-jeong (South Korea) Kong Hee-yong
- Mixed doubles: (Denmark) Jesper Toft (Denmark) Amalie Magelund

The 2025 Orléans Masters (officially known as the Orléans Masters Badminton presented by Victor 2025 for sponsorship reasons) was a badminton tournament that took place at the Palais des Sports, Orléans, France, from 4 to 9 March 2025 and had a total prize of US$240,000.

== Tournament ==
The 2025 Orléans Masters was the sixth tournament of the 2025 BWF World Tour and was part of the Orléans Masters championships, which have been held since 2012. This tournament was organized by the Orléans Masters with sanction from the BWF.

=== Venue ===
This tournament has been held at the Palais des Sports in Orléans, France.

=== Point distribution ===
Below is the point distribution table for each phase of the tournament based on the BWF points system for the BWF World Tour Super 300 event.

Winner	Runner-up	3/4	5/8	9/16	17/32	33/64	65/128
7,000	5,950	4,900	3,850	2,750	1,670	660	320

=== Prize pool ===
The total prize money is US$240,000 with the distribution of the prize money in accordance with BWF regulations.

Event	Winner	Finalist	Semi-finals	Quarter-finals	Last 16
Singles	$18,000	$9,120	$3,480	$1,440	$840
Doubles	$18,960	$9,120	$3,360	$1,740	$900

== Men's singles ==
=== Seeds ===
1. (Malaysia) Lee Zii Jia (quarter-finals)
2. (Chinese Taipei) Lin Chun-yi (final)
3. (Singapore) Loh Kean Yew (first round)
4. (France) Alex Lanier (champion)
5. (Japan) Kenta Nishimoto (quarter-finals)
6. (France) Toma Junior Popov (withdrew)
7. (Hong Kong) Ng Ka Long (first round)
8. (Hong Kong) Lee Cheuk Yiu (first round)

=== Finals ===
Semi-finals
(Republic of Ireland) Nhat Nguyen	19	18
4	(France) Alex Lanier	21	21
PFQ	(India) Ayush Shetty	13	15
2	(Chinese Taipei) Lin Chun-yi	21	21

Final
4	(France) Alex Lanier	21	21
2	(Chinese Taipei) Lin Chun-yi	13	18

=== Top half ===
==== Section 1 ====
First round
1	(Malaysia) Lee Z J	17	21	21
(Chinese Taipei) Chi Y-j	21	17	17
(Japan) K Takahashi	19	14
Q3	(India) S Kidambi	21	21
SWM	(Japan) Y Tanaka	21	21
Q4	(Belgium) J Carraggi	14	11
(Republic of Ireland) N Nguyen	21	21
(India) S Karunakaran	18	11

Second round
1	(Malaysia) Lee Z J	21	21
Q3	(India) S Kidambi	11	17
SWM	(Japan) Y Tanaka	5	2^{r}
(Republic of Ireland) N Nguyen	21	8

Quarter-finals
1	(Malaysia) Lee Z J	21	7
(Republic of Ireland) N Nguyen	23	21

==== Section 2 ====
First round
4	(France) A Lanier	21	21
(India) P Rajawat	17	7
(Japan) T Obayashi	14	21	21
(Canada) B Yang	21	16	17
5	(Japan) K Nishimoto	21	21
Q1	(India) S Subramanian	13	8
(Chinese Taipei) Su L-y	18	16
(South Korea) Jeon H-j	21	21

Second round
4	(France) A Lanier	21	21
(Japan) T Obayashi	14	15
5	(Japan) K Nishimoto	21	21
(South Korea) Jeon H-j	17	16

Quarter-finals
4	(France) A Lanier	21	13	21
5	(Japan) K Nishimoto	17	21	14

=== Bottom half ===
==== Section 3 ====
First round
(Denmark) R Gemke	21	14	21
(China) Wang ZX	15	21	10
(Thailand) K Wangcharoen	14	21	21
8	(Hong Kong) Lee C Y	21	13	11
PFQ	(Indonesia) A Farhan	14	21	17
(Hong Kong) J Gunawan	21	13	21
PFQ	(India) A Shetty	21	21
3	(Singapore) Loh K Y	17	9

Second round
(Denmark) R Gemke	21	21
(Thailand) K Wangcharoen	17	13
(Hong Kong) J Gunawan	17	17
PFQ	(India) A Shetty	21	21

Quarter-finals
(Denmark) R Gemke	16	23	17
PFQ	(India) A Shetty	21	21	21

==== Section 4 ====
First round
(Singapore) J Teh	15	21	21
(India) K George	21	16	10
(Chinese Taipei) Lee C-h	21	21
7	(Hong Kong) Ng K L	18	12
(India) Prannoy H. S.	21	20	21
(Chinese Taipei) Wang T-w	11	22	9
Q2	(Malaysia) Cheam J W	20	15
2	(Chinese Taipei) Lin C-y	22	21

Second round
(Singapore) J Teh	5	21	19
(Chinese Taipei) Lee C-h	21	11	21
(India) Prannoy H. S.	18	9
2	(Chinese Taipei) Lin C-y	21	21

Quarter-finals
(Chinese Taipei) Lee C-h	21	20	12
2	(Chinese Taipei) Lin C-y	18	22	21

== Women's singles ==
=== Seeds ===
1. (South Korea) An Se-young (champion)
2. (China) Wang Zhiyi (quarter-finals)
3. (China) Han Yue (first round)
4. (Thailand) Pornpawee Chochuwong (second round)
5. (Japan) Tomoka Miyazaki (quarter-finals)
6. (Thailand) Supanida Katethong (first round)
7. (Thailand) Ratchanok Intanon (first round)
8. (China) Chen Yufei (final)

=== Finals ===
Semi-finals
1	(South Korea) An Se-young	20	21	21
(China) Gao Fangjie	22	7	14
(United States) Beiwen Zhang	21	13	12
8	(China) Chen Yufei	15	21	21

Final
1	(South Korea) An Se-young	21	21
8	(China) Chen Yufei	14	15

=== Top half ===
==== Section 1 ====
First round
1	(South Korea) An S-y	21	21
Q1	(India) U Hooda	9	15
(Thailand) P Choeikeewong	24	21
(Chinese Taipei) Chiu P-c	22	14
5	(Japan) T Miyazaki	21	21
(Chinese Taipei) Pai Y-p	12	11
Q4	(India) I Baruah	13	13
Q2	(Japan) A Takahashi	21	21

Second round
1	(South Korea) An S-y	21	21
(Thailand) P Choeikeewong	8	4
5	(Japan) T Miyazaki	21	21
Q2	(Japan) A Takahashi	16	18

Quarter-finals
1	(South Korea) An S-y	21	21
5	(Japan) T Miyazaki	6	9

==== Section 2 ====
First round
3	(China) Han Y	19	21	19
(Chinese Taipei) Lin H-t	21	7	21
(Japan) R Gunji	21	15
(India) M Bansod	6	6^{r}
7	(Thailand) R Intanon	20	20
(Japan) N Nidaira	22	22
(China) Gao FJ	21	21	22
(Denmark) L Christophersen	23	15	20

Second round
(Chinese Taipei) Lin H-t	8	12
(Japan) R Gunji	21	21
(Japan) N Nidaira	19	12
(China) Gao FJ	21	21

Quarter-finals
(Japan) R Gunji	13	21	17
(China) Gao FJ	21	19	21

=== Bottom half ===
==== Section 3 ====
First round
(Scotland) K Gilmour	w	/	o
(Singapore) Yeo J M
Q3	(Hong Kong) Lo S Y	21	21	21
6	(Thailand) S Katethong	6	23	11
(Canada) M Li	15	15
(United States) BW Zhang	21	21
(Chinese Taipei) Sung S-y	19	10
4	(Thailand) P Chochuwong	21	21

Second round
(Scotland) K Gilmour	21	21
Q3	(Hong Kong) Lo S Y	10	12
(United States) BW Zhang	21	21
4	(Thailand) P Chochuwong	19	17

Quarter-finals
(Scotland) K Gilmour	20	12
(United States) BW Zhang	22	21

==== Section 4 ====
First round
(South Korea) Sim Y-j	23	21
(Denmark) L Kjærsfeldt	21	7
PFQ	(Japan) H Akechi	23	21	16
8	(China) Chen YF	25	19	21
(South Korea) Kim G-e	21	21
(Japan) K Sugiyama	19	9
PFQ	(Indonesia) K A C Dewi	13	8
2	(China) Wang ZY	21	21

Second round
(South Korea) Sim Y-j	21	18	12
8	(China) Chen YF	18	21	21
(South Korea) Kim G-e	12	14
2	(China) Wang ZY	21	21

Quarter-finals
8	(China) Chen YF	21	21
2	(China) Wang ZY	10	11

== Men's doubles ==
=== Seeds ===
1. (China) Liang Weikeng / Wang Chang (final)
2. (Malaysia) Aaron Chia / Soh Wooi Yik (first round)
3. (China) He Jiting / Ren Xiangyu (first round)
4. (Chinese Taipei) Lee Jhe-huei / Yang Po-hsuan (quarter-finals)
5. (Malaysia) Man Wei Chong / Tee Kai Wun (first round)
6. (China) Chen Boyang / Liu Yi (quarter-finals)
7. (Chinese Taipei) Chiu Hsiang-chieh / Wang Chi-lin (second round)
8. (Malaysia) Junaidi Arif / Yap Roy King (semi-finals)

=== Finals ===
Semi-finals
1	(China) Liang Weikeng (China) Wang Chang	21	21
8	(Malaysia) Junaidi Arif (Malaysia) Yap Roy King	14	13
(South Korea) Kim Won-ho (South Korea) Seo Seung-jae	18	21	19
(South Korea) Kang Min-hyuk (South Korea) Ki Dong-ju	21	9	21

Final
1	(China) Liang Weikeng (China) Wang Chang	13	21	18
(South Korea) Kang Min-hyuk (South Korea) Ki Dong-ju	21	18	21

=== Top half ===
==== Section 1 ====
First round
1	(China) Liang WK (China) Wang C	21	22
PFQ	(Malaysia) Kang K X (Malaysia) A Tai	13	20
(Chinese Taipei) Chang K-c (Chinese Taipei) Po L-w	10	22	21
(Chinese Taipei) Lu M-c (Chinese Taipei) Tang K-w	21	20	16
6	(China) Chen BY (China) Liu Y	15	21	21
(Chinese Taipei) Lee F-c (Chinese Taipei) Lee F-j	21	15	19
Q4	(France) J Maio (France) W Villeger	14	12
(Denmark) A Søndergaard (Denmark) J Toft	21	21

Second round
1	(China) Liang WK (China) Wang C	21	21
(Chinese Taipei) Chang K-c (Chinese Taipei) Po L-w	12	16
6	(China) Chen BY (China) Liu Y	21	22
(Denmark) A Søndergaard (Denmark) J Toft	16	20

Quarter-finals
1	(China) Liang WK (China) Wang C	21	26
6	(China) Chen BY (China) Liu Y	16	24

==== Section 2 ====
First round
4	(Chinese Taipei) Lee J-h (Chinese Taipei) Yang P-hs	21	21
(Chinese Taipei) Liu K-h (Chinese Taipei) Yang P-ha	17	16
(Denmark) W K Boe (Denmark) C F Kjær	15	18
(India) P Roy (India) K S Pratheek	21	21
8	(Malaysia) J Arif (Malaysia) Yap R K	17	21	21
(India) H Amsakarunan (India) R Kumar	21	7	17
(Chinese Taipei) Chiang C-w (Chinese Taipei) Wu H-y	21	19	20
(United States) Chen Z-y (United States) P Smith	18	21	22

Second round
4	(Chinese Taipei) Lee J-h (Chinese Taipei) Yang P-hs	21	21
(India) P Roy (India) K S Pratheek	16	13
8	(Malaysia) J Arif (Malaysia) Yap R K	21	21
(United States) Chen Z-y (United States) P Smith	18	11

Quarter-finals
4	(Chinese Taipei) Lee J-h (Chinese Taipei) Yang P-hs	19	18
8	(Malaysia) J Arif (Malaysia) Yap R K	21	21

=== Bottom half ===
==== Section 3 ====
First round
(Thailand) P Sukphun (Thailand) P Teeraratsakul	21	17	21
(Malaysia) N M Azriyn A (Malaysia) Tan W K	17	21	13
(South Korea) Kim W-h (South Korea) Seo S-j	21	21
5	(Malaysia) Man W C (Malaysia) Tee K W	16	14
(Japan) H Midorikawa (Japan) K Yamashita	17	22	21
(Malaysia) Low H Y (Malaysia) Ng E C	21	20	17
(Chinese Taipei) Chen Z-r (Chinese Taipei) Lin Y-c	21	21
3	(China) He JT (China) Ren XY	18	17

Second round
(Thailand) P Sukphun (Thailand) P Teeraratsakul	20	13
(South Korea) Kim W-h (South Korea) Seo S-j	22	21
(Japan) H Midorikawa (Japan) K Yamashita	11	19
(Chinese Taipei) Chen Z-r (Chinese Taipei) Lin Y-c	21	21

Quarter-finals
(South Korea) Kim W-h (South Korea) Seo S-j	21	21
(Chinese Taipei) Chen Z-r (Chinese Taipei) Lin Y-c	10	7

==== Section 4 ====
First round
(South Korea) Kang M-h (South Korea) Ki D-j	21	21
Q3	(Chinese Taipei) Su C-h (Chinese Taipei) Wu G-x	16	13
Q1	(Chinese Taipei) Chen C-k (Chinese Taipei) Lin B-w
7	(Chinese Taipei) Chiu H-c (Chinese Taipei) Wang C-l	w	/	o
(France) É Adam (France) L Rossi	21	11	18
(Scotland) C Grimley (Scotland) M Grimley	18	21	21
Q2	(China) Sun WJ (China) Zhu YJ	21	21
2	(Malaysia) A Chia (Malaysia) Soh W Y	18	8

Second round
(South Korea) Kang M-h (South Korea) Ki D-j	21	22
7	(Chinese Taipei) Chiu H-c (Chinese Taipei) Wang C-l	19	20
(Scotland) C Grimley (Scotland) M Grimley	21	21	19
Q2	(China) Sun WJ (China) Zhu YJ	23	17	21

Quarter-finals
(South Korea) Kang M-h (South Korea) Ki D-j	21	21
Q2	(China) Sun WJ (China) Zhu YJ	16	16

== Women's doubles ==
=== Seeds ===
1. (South Korea) Baek Ha-na / Lee So-hee (final)
2. (Malaysia) Pearly Tan / Thinaah Muralitharan (quarter-finals)
3. (Thailand) Laksika Kanlaha / Phataimas Muenwong (first round)
4. (Hong Kong) Yeung Nga Ting / Yeung Pui Lam (quarter-finals)
5. (Japan) Yuki Fukushima / Mayu Matsumoto (semi-finals)
6. (South Korea) Kim Hye-jeong / Kong Hee-yong (champions)
7. (China) Jia Yifan / Zhang Shuxian (semi-finals)
8. (China) Chen Qingchen / Wang Tingge (first round)

=== Finals ===
Semi-finals
1	(South Korea) Baek Ha-na (South Korea) Lee So-hee	21
5	(Japan) Yuki Fukushima (Japan) Mayu Matsumoto	16^{r}
6	(South Korea) Kim Hye-jeong (South Korea) Kong Hee-yong	19	21	21
7	(China) Jia Yifan (China) Zhang Shuxian	21	9	15

Final
1	(South Korea) Baek Ha-na (South Korea) Lee So-hee	18	21
6	(South Korea) Kim Hye-jeong (South Korea) Kong Hee-yong	21	23

=== Top half ===
==== Section 1 ====
First round
1	(South Korea) Baek H-n (South Korea) Lee S-h	21	21
Q2	(China) Luo Y (China) Wang ZM	13	14
(France) E Jacob (France) A Tran	21	14	21
PFQ	(Canada) J Cheung (Canada) C Choi	19	21	16
8	(China) Chen QC (China) Wang TG	21	21	18
(Denmark) J Finne-Ipsen (Denmark) M Surrow	23	17	21
(Chinese Taipei) Sung S-y (Chinese Taipei) Yu C-h	11	17
(Indonesia) A Rahayu (Indonesia) S F S Ramadhanti	21	21

Second round
1	(South Korea) Baek H-n (South Korea) Lee S-h	21	21
(France) E Jacob (France) A Tran	8	9
(Denmark) J Finne-Ipsen (Denmark) M Surrow	18	19
(Indonesia) A Rahayu (Indonesia) S F S Ramadhanti	21	21

Quarter-finals
1	(South Korea) Baek H-n (South Korea) Lee S-h	21	21
(Indonesia) A Rahayu (Indonesia) S F S Ramadhanti	18	10

==== Section 2 ====
First round
4	(Hong Kong) Yeung N T (Hong Kong) Yeung P L	21	13	21
(Chinese Taipei) Lin X-m (Chinese Taipei) Wang Y-q	18	21	18
Q3	(Chinese Taipei) Hung H-e (Chinese Taipei) Lee C-c	9	17
(Denmark) A C Kudsk (Denmark) S Schulz	21	21
5	(Japan) Y Fukushima (Japan) M Matsumoto	21	21
(Chinese Taipei) Hu L-f (Chinese Taipei) Jheng Y-c	13	14
(Sweden) M Sjöö (Sweden) T Sjöö	15	14
(Chinese Taipei) Chang C-h (Chinese Taipei) Yang C-t	21	21

Second round
4	(Hong Kong) Yeung N T (Hong Kong) Yeung P L	21	21
(Denmark) A C Kudsk (Denmark) S Schulz	13	17
5	(Japan) Y Fukushima (Japan) M Matsumoto	21	21
(Chinese Taipei) Chang C-h (Chinese Taipei) Yang C-t	15	15

Quarter-finals
4	(Hong Kong) Yeung N T (Hong Kong) Yeung P L	13	13
5	(Japan) Y Fukushima (Japan) M Matsumoto	21	21

=== Bottom half ===
==== Section 3 ====
First round
(Thailand) B Aimsaard (Thailand) N Aimsaard	21	11	21
Q1	(China) Keng SL (China) Li HZ	14	21	9
(India) P Konjengbam (India) S Mishra	4	9
6	(South Korea) Kim H-j (South Korea) Kong H-y	21	21
(Malaysia) Go P K (Malaysia) Teoh M X	21	21
(Turkey) B Erçetin (Turkey) N İnci	19	17
(Indonesia) M T Puspitasari (Indonesia) R A Rose	21	23
3	(Thailand) L Kanlaha (Thailand) P Muenwong	11	21

Second round
(Thailand) B Aimsaard (Thailand) N Aimsaard	21	18	11
6	(South Korea) Kim H-j (South Korea) Kong H-y	19	21	21
(Malaysia) Go P K (Malaysia) Teoh M X	21	21
(Indonesia) M T Puspitasari (Indonesia) R A Rose	18	15

Quarter-finals
6	(South Korea) Kim H-j (South Korea) Kong H-y	21	21
(Malaysia) Go P K (Malaysia) Teoh M X	13	11

==== Section 4 ====
First round
(Scotland) J MacPherson (Scotland) C Torrance	18	14
(Chinese Taipei) Hsu Y-h (Chinese Taipei) Lin J-y	21	21
(Chinese Taipei) Hsieh P-s (Chinese Taipei) Hung E-t	20	21	15
7	(China) Jia YF (China) Zhang SX	22	19	21
(Chinese Taipei) Chen S-y (Chinese Taipei) Hsieh Y-e	9	14
(South Korea) Jeong N-e (South Korea) Lee Y-w	21	21
Q4	(Chinese Taipei) N G Chan (Chinese Taipei) Lin C-c	23	8
2	(Malaysia) P Tan (Malaysia) Thinaah M	25	21

Second round
(Chinese Taipei) Hsu Y-h (Chinese Taipei) Lin J-y	7	13
7	(China) Jia YF (China) Zhang SX	21	21
(South Korea) Jeong N-e (South Korea) Lee Y-w	20	21	14
2	(Malaysia) P Tan (Malaysia) Thinaah M	22	11	21

Quarter-finals
7	(China) Jia YF (China) Zhang SX	21	21
2	(Malaysia) P Tan (Malaysia) Thinaah M	15	19

== Mixed doubles ==
=== Seeds ===
1. (Malaysia) Chen Tang Jie / Toh Ee Wei (second round)
2. (France) Thom Gicquel / Delphine Delrue (first round)
3. (Chinese Taipei) Yang Po-hsuan / Hu Ling-fang (quarter-finals)
4. (Japan) Hiroki Midorikawa / Natsu Saito (quarter-finals)
5. (Denmark) Jesper Toft / Amalie Magelund (champions)
6. (Malaysia) Hoo Pang Ron / Cheng Su Yin (quarter-finals)
7. (South Korea) Lee Jong-min / Chae Yu-jung (semi-finals)
8. (Singapore) Terry Hee / Jin Yujia (first round)

=== Finals ===
Semi-finals
(Indonesia) Rehan Naufal Kusharjanto (Indonesia) Gloria Emanuelle Widjaja	21	18	21
7	(South Korea) Lee Jong-min (South Korea) Chae Yu-jung	16	21	13
5	(Denmark) Jesper Toft (Denmark) Amalie Magelund	21	21
(Thailand) Ruttanapak Oupthong (Thailand) Jhenicha Sudjaipraparat	12	16

Final
(Indonesia) Rehan Naufal Kusharjanto (Indonesia) Gloria Emanuelle Widjaja	17	13
5	(Denmark) Jesper Toft (Denmark) Amalie Magelund	21	21

=== Top half ===
==== Section 1 ====
First round
1	(Malaysia) Chen T J (Malaysia) Toh E W	21	21
PFQ	(India) A Surya (India) A Pramuthesh	10	15
(South Korea) Ki D-j (South Korea) Jeong N-e	21	20	14
(Indonesia) R N Kusharjanto (Indonesia) G E Widjaja	17	22	21
6	(Malaysia) Hoo P R (Malaysia) Cheng S Y	21	21
Q3	(Germany) J R Jansen (Germany) T P Nguyen	17	15
(Chinese Taipei) Lu M-c (Chinese Taipei) Hung E-t	16	21	21
(Canada) T A Lindeman (Canada) J Wu	21	9	15

Second round
1	(Malaysia) Chen T J (Malaysia) Toh E W	8	17
(Indonesia) R N Kusharjanto (Indonesia) G E Widjaja	21	21
6	(Malaysia) Hoo P R (Malaysia) Cheng S Y	16	21	21
(Chinese Taipei) Lu M-c (Chinese Taipei) Hung E-t	21	13	16

Quarter-finals
(Indonesia) R N Kusharjanto (Indonesia) G E Widjaja	w	/	o
6	(Malaysia) Hoo P R (Malaysia) Cheng S Y

==== Section 2 ====
First round
4	(Japan) H Midorikawa (Japan) N Saito	21	23
(Thailand) P Teeraratsakul (Thailand) P Muenwong	18	21
(China) Zhu YJ (China) Zhang C	21	21
(Malaysia) Wong T C (Malaysia) Lim C S	9	16
7	(South Korea) Lee J-m (South Korea) Chae Y-j	21	22
(India) D Kapila (India) T Crasto	16	20
(India) S Karunakaran (India) A Variyath	18	19
Q1	(England) R Easton (England) L Tolman	21	21

Second round
4	(Japan) H Midorikawa (Japan) N Saito	21	21
(China) Zhu YJ (China) Zhang C	17	15
7	(South Korea) Lee J-m (South Korea) Chae Y-j	21	19	21
Q1	(England) R Easton (England) L Tolman	8	21	6

Quarter-finals
4	(Japan) H Midorikawa (Japan) N Saito	17	21	19
7	(South Korea) Lee J-m (South Korea) Chae Y-j	21	11	21

=== Bottom half ===
==== Section 3 ====
First round
(Chinese Taipei) Wu H-y (Chinese Taipei) Yang C-y	16	17
(Indonesia) J Hidayatullah (Indonesia) F Pasaribu	21	21
(Chinese Taipei) Chen C-k (Chinese Taipei) Hsu Y-h	16	21	19
5	(Denmark) J Toft (Denmark) A Magelund	21	16	21
(India) R Kapoor (India) R Gadde	20	24	21
(Chinese Taipei) Ye H-w (Chinese Taipei) N G Chan	22	22	16
(Algeria) K Mammeri (Algeria) T Mammeri	16	17
3	(Chinese Taipei) Yang P-hs (Chinese Taipei) Hu L-f	21	21

Second round
(Indonesia) J Hidayatullah (Indonesia) F Pasaribu	13	21	19
5	(Denmark) J Toft (Denmark) A Magelund	21	16	21
(India) R Kapoor (India) R Gadde
3	(Chinese Taipei) Yang P-hs (Chinese Taipei) Hu L-f	w	/	o

Quarter-finals
5	(Denmark) J Toft (Denmark) A Magelund	21	21
3	(Chinese Taipei) Yang P-hs (Chinese Taipei) Hu L-f	13	17

==== Section 4 ====
First round
(Scotland) A Dunn (Scotland) J MacPherson	14	13
(Indonesia) A Syahnawi (Indonesia) N V Marwah	21	21
(Thailand) R Oupthong (Thailand) J Sudjaipraparat	21	21
8	(Singapore) T Hee (Singapore) Jin YJ	18	15
(Indonesia) A Maulana (Indonesia) I C S Jamil	21	21
Q4	(Japan) Y Shimogami (Japan) S Hobara	18	16
Q2	(Chinese Taipei) Liu K-h (Chinese Taipei) Jheng Y-c	18	21	21
2	(France) T Gicquel (France) D Delrue	21	13	12

Second round
(Indonesia) A Syahnawi (Indonesia) N V Marwah	18	26	14
(Thailand) R Oupthong (Thailand) J Sudjaipraparat	21	24	21
(Indonesia) A Maulana (Indonesia) I C S Jamil	21	21
Q2	(Chinese Taipei) Liu K-h (Chinese Taipei) Jheng Y-c	13	14

Quarter-finals
(Thailand) R Oupthong (Thailand) J Sudjaipraparat	21	21
(Indonesia) A Maulana (Indonesia) I C S Jamil	11	12

Preceded by 2025 German Open	BWF World Tour; 2025 BWF season	Succeeded by 2025 All England Open; 2025 Ruichang China Masters
