= 2018 BWF World Junior Championships – Mixed doubles =

2018 BWF World Junior Championships Mixed Doubles
Tournament details
- Dates: 12 – 18 November 2018
- Edition: 20th
- Level: International
- Venue: Markham Pan Am Centre
- Location: Markham, Canada

The mixed doubles of the tournament 2018 BWF World Junior Championships was held on 12–18 November. The defending champions from the last edition are Rinov Rivaldy / Pitha Haningtyas Mentari from Indonesia.

== Seeds ==
1. (China) Guo Xinwa / Liu Xuanxuan (third round)
2. (Indonesia) Rehan Naufal Kusharjanto / Siti Fadia Silva Ramadhanti (final)
3. (Indonesia) Pramudya Kusumawardana / Ribka Sugiarto (quarterfinals)
4. (Indonesia) Ghifari Anandaffa Prihardika / Lisa Ayu Kusumawati (quarterfinals)
5. (China) Di Zijian / Li Yijing (second round)
6. (Brazil) Fabricio Farias / Jaqueline Lima (second round)
7. (France) Fabien Delrue / Juliette Moinard (fourth round)
8. (China) Shang Yichen / Zhang Shuxian (semifinals)

9. (South Korea) Wang Chan / Jeong Na-eun (semifinals)
10. (Japan) Hiroki Midorikawa / Natsu Saito (fourth round)
11. (France) William Villeger / Sharone Bauer (third round)
12. (Thailand) Weeraphat Phakrajung / Chasinee Korepap (second round)
13. (France) Maxime Briot / Ainoa Desmons (second round)
14. (Netherlands) Wessel van der Aar / Alyssa Tirtosentono (second round)
15. (Peru) Bruno Barrueto Deza / Fernanda Saponara Rivva (second round)
16. (South Korea) Shin Tae-yang / Lee Jung-hyun (fourth round)

Click on the seed number of a player to go to their draw section.

== Draw ==
=== Finals ===
Quarterfinals
(Indonesia) Leo Rolly Carnando (Indonesia) Indah Cahya Sari Jamil | 21 | 21
(Malaysia) Chia Wei Jie (Malaysia) Toh Ee Wei | 12 | 17
3 | (Indonesia) Pramudya Kusumawardana (Indonesia) Ribka Sugiarto | 15 | 22
8 | (China) Shang Yichen (China) Zhang Shuxian | 21 | 24
9 | (South Korea) Wang Chan (South Korea) Jeong Na-eun | 21 | 12 | 30
4 | (Indonesia) Ghifari Anandaffa Prihardika (Indonesia) Lisa Ayu Kusumawati | 16 | 21 | 28
(Malaysia) Choong Hon Jian (Malaysia) Pearly Tan Koong Le | 10 | 17
2 | (Indonesia) Rehan Naufal Kusharjanto (Indonesia) Siti Fadia Silva Ramadhanti | 21 | 21

Semifinals
(Indonesia) Leo Rolly Carnando (Indonesia) Indah Cahya Sari Jamil | 21 | 21 | 21
8 | (China) Shang Yichen (China) Zhang Shuxian | 13 | 23 | 19
9 | (South Korea) Wang Chan (South Korea) Jeong Na-eun | 18 | 18
2 | (Indonesia) Rehan Naufal Kusharjanto (Indonesia) Siti Fadia Silva Ramadhanti | 21 | 21

Finals
(Indonesia) Leo Rolly Carnando (Indonesia) Indah Cahya Sari Jamil | 21 | 21
2 | (Indonesia) Rehan Naufal Kusharjanto (Indonesia) Siti Fadia Silva Ramadhanti | 15 | 9

=== Top half ===
==== Section 1 ====
First round
(India) A Shetty (India) R Lambe | 13 | 14
(Canada) K Wang (Canada) W Zhang | 21 | 21
(Czech Republic) V Kulisek (Czech Republic) L Krpatova | 22 | 9
(Indonesia) L R Carnando (Indonesia) I C S Jamil | 24 | 21
(Ukraine) G Beketov (Ukraine) V Masaylo | 19 | 18
(Scotland) A Pringle (Scotland) R Andrew | 21 | 21
(Macau) Che P N (Macau) Wong C W | 21 | 21
(Uganda) E Emuddu (Uganda) F S M Rafi | 9 | 10
(Chinese Taipei) Yu S-p (Chinese Taipei) Li Z-q | 21 | 21
(Scotland) M Grimley (Scotland) S Sidebottom | 15 | 18

Second round
1 | (China) Guo XW (China) Liu XX | 21 | 21
(Slovakia) J Horak (Slovakia) M Tarcalova | 9 | 10
(Canada) K Wang (Canada) W Zhang | 8 | 9
(Indonesia) L R Carnando (Indonesia) I C S Jamil | 21 | 21
11 | (France) W Villeger (France) S Bauer | 21 | 21
(Scotland) A Pringle (Scotland) R Andrew | 18 | 13
(Macau) Che P N (Macau) Wong C W | 7 | 10
(Chinese Taipei) Yu S-p (Chinese Taipei) Li Z-q | 21 | 21

Third round
1 | (China) Guo XW (China) Liu XX | 13 | 21 | 15
(Indonesia) L R Carnando (Indonesia) I C S Jamil | 21 | 15 | 21
11 | (France) W Villeger (France) S Bauer | 13 | 22
(Chinese Taipei) Yu S-p (Chinese Taipei) Li Z-q | 21 | 24

Fourth round
(Indonesia) L R Carnando (Indonesia) I C S Jamil | 21 | 20 | 21
(Chinese Taipei) Yu S-p (Chinese Taipei) Li Z-q | 18 | 22 | 10

==== Section 2 ====
First round
(Ukraine) I Medynskiy (Ukraine) V Rudakova | 16 | 20
(Singapore) Toh H Z (Singapore) B Lim | 21 | 22
(India) S S K Podile (India) S Jupudi | 12 | 9
(Germany) L Resch (Germany) E Moszczynski | 21 | 21
(Faroe Islands) A A Myrini (Faroe Islands) L M Joensen | 8 | 8
(United States) R Nibu (United States) A Lee | 21 | 21
(Thailand) R Makkasasithorn (Thailand) P Suwatnodom | 21 | 21
(Faroe Islands) A M Jacobsen (Faroe Islands) A K M Pedersen | 5 | 16
(Malaysia) Chia W J (Malaysia) Toh E W | 21 | 21
(Kenya) U O Shah (Kenya) K Ghia | 3 | 4
(New Zealand) D Vong (New Zealand) R Apalisok | 17 | 21 | 15
(England) E van Leeuwen (England) A Lado | 21 | 18 | 21

Second round
6 | (Brazil) F Farias (Brazil) J Lima | 18 | 21 | 18
(Singapore) Toh H Z (Singapore) B Lim | 21 | 15 | 21
(Germany) L Resch (Germany) E Moszczynski | 21 | 21
(United States) R Nibu (United States) A Lee | 12 | 14
15 | (Peru) B Barrueto (Peru) F Saponara | 16 | 11
(Thailand) R Makkasasithorn (Thailand) P Suwatnodom | 21 | 21
(Malaysia) Chia W J (Malaysia) Toh E W | 21 | 21
(England) E van Leeuwen (England) A Lado | 8 | 9

Third round
(Singapore) Toh H Z (Singapore) B Lim | 16 | 21 | 12
(Germany) L Resch (Germany) E Moszczynski | 21 | 17 | 21
(Thailand) R Makkasasithorn (Thailand) P Suwatnodom | 12 | 21 | 9
(Malaysia) Chia W J (Malaysia) Toh E W | 21 | 15 | 21

Fourth round
(Germany) L Resch (Germany) E Moszczynski | 11 | 12
(Malaysia) Chia W J (Malaysia) Toh E W | 21 | 21

==== Section 3 ====
First round
(Australia) P Yan (Australia) J Vega | 18 | 11
(Singapore) D M Ng (Singapore) J R Sito | 21 | 21
(Hong Kong) Chow H L (Hong Kong) Leung S L | 21 | 21
(South Africa) J Elliott (South Africa) M de Beer | 16 | 10
(Switzerland) M Q Pham (Switzerland) M Schnider | 10 | 22 | 21
(New Zealand) E Lau (New Zealand) J Yu | 21 | 20 | 17
(Germany) A Sonnenschein (Germany) L Michalski | 21 | 6
(United States) C Cade (United States) S Pandey | 10 | 2^{r}
(Thailand) A Teerawiwat (Thailand) P Chaiwan | 21 | 18 | 21
(Sweden) J Azelius (Sweden) M Norrman | 17 | 21 | 19

Second round
3 | (Indonesia) P Kusumawardana (Indonesia) R Sugiarto | 21 | 21
(Japan) T Kawamoto (Japan) S Fukamoto | 11 | 17
(Singapore) D M Ng (Singapore) J R Sito | 21 | 21
(Hong Kong) Chow H L (Hong Kong) Leung S L | 13 | 16
16 | (South Korea) Shin T-y (South Korea) Lee J-h | 21 | 21
(Switzerland) M Q Pham (Switzerland) M Schnider | 12 | 10
(Germany) A Sonnenschein (Germany) L Michalski | 23 | 18 | 21
(Thailand) A Teerawiwat (Thailand) P Chaiwan | 21 | 21 | 18

Third round
3 | (Indonesia) P Kusumawardana (Indonesia) R Sugiarto | 23 | 21
(Singapore) D M Ng (Singapore) J R Sito | 21 | 14
16 | (South Korea) Shin T-y (South Korea) Lee J-h | 21 | 21
(Germany) A Sonnenschein (Germany) L Michalski | 14 | 10

Fourth round
3 | (Indonesia) P Kusumawardana (Indonesia) R Sugiarto | 21 | 21
16 | (South Korea) Shin T-y (South Korea) Lee J-h | 18 | 18

==== Section 4 ====
First round
(Netherlands) G Duijs (Netherlands) M Linders | 15 | 10
(Denmark) D Lundgaard (Denmark) A Magelund | 21 | 21
(Norway) J Osthassel (Norway) E Waland | 11 | 21
(Denmark) R Espersen (Denmark) C Busch | 21 | 23
(Mongolia) T Gombodorj (Mongolia) M Lkhagvasuren | 5 | 9
(Austria) K Meusburger (Austria) R Winkler | 21 | 21
(China) Feng YZ (China) Lin FL | 21 | 21
(Netherlands) T van der Lecq (Netherlands) M Lugters | 9 | 9
(Sri Lanka) C Illeperumachchi (Sri Lanka) T A Ratnayaka | 10 | 22 | 18
(Poland) M Wrzalik (Poland) A Foryta | 21 | 20 | 21
(India) S K. Krishnaprasad (India) A Bhat K. | 21 | 21
(Mexico) G Saavedra (Mexico) F Rio | 16 | 4

Second round
8 | (China) Shang YC (China) Zhang SX | 16 | 21 | 21
(Denmark) D Lundgaard (Denmark) A Magelund | 21 | 18 | 16
(Denmark) R Espersen (Denmark) C Busch | 21 | 21
(Austria) K Meusburger (Austria) R Winkler | 8 | 18
10 | (Japan) H Midorikawa (Japan) N Saito | 21 | 28
(China) Feng YZ (China) Lin FL | 17 | 26
(Poland) M Wrzalik (Poland) A Foryta | 10 | 13
(India) S K. Krishnaprasad (India) A Bhat K. | 21 | 21

Third round
8 | (China) Shang YC (China) Zhang SX | 21 | 14 | 21
(Denmark) R Espersen (Denmark) C Busch | 18 | 21 | 18
10 | (Japan) H Midorikawa (Japan) N Saito | 21 | 21
(India) S K. Krishnaprasad (India) A Bhat K. | 14 | 14

Fourth round
8 | (China) Shang YC (China) Zhang SX | 21 | 21
10 | (Japan) H Midorikawa (Japan) N Saito | 19 | 19

=== Bottom half ===
==== Section 5 ====
First round
(India) N Bokka (India) S Bandi | 8 | 21 | 16
(Chinese Taipei) Chen S-c (Chinese Taipei) Wang Y-q | 21 | 18 | 21
(New Zealand) R Tong (New Zealand) E Smith | 21 | 21
(Peru) S O Alzamora (Peru) S Chen Y C | 17 | 13
(Hong Kong) Liu C W (Hong Kong) Yeung P L | 21 | 21
(Kenya) M Solanki (Kenya) S Patel | 1 | 8
(United States) D Tan (United States) I Rusli | 21 | 13 | 18
(Sri Lanka) C Dias (Sri Lanka) H N Ambalangodage | 17 | 21 | 21
(Singapore) A Tan (Singapore) J Hooi | 21 | 23
(Czech Republic) J Janostik (Czech Republic) T S van Coppenolle | 4 | 21
(South Africa) R Summers (South Africa) C Yiatses | 10 | 19
(Poland) A Niczyporuk (Poland) J Plawecka | 21 | 21

Second round
(Chinese Taipei) Chen S-c (Chinese Taipei) Wang Y-q | 21 | 21
(New Zealand) R Tong (New Zealand) E Smith | 9 | 17
(Hong Kong) Liu C W (Hong Kong) Yeung P L | 16 | 21 | 17
9 | (South Korea) Wang C (South Korea) Jeong N-e | 21 | 11 | 21
(Sri Lanka) C Dias (Sri Lanka) H N Ambalangodage | 11 | 17
(Singapore) A Tan (Singapore) J Hooi | 21 | 21
(Poland) A Niczyporuk (Poland) J Plawecka | 6 | 6
7 | (France) F Delrue (France) J Moinard | 21 | 21

Third round
(Chinese Taipei) Chen S-c (Chinese Taipei) Wang Y-q | 15 | 13
9 | (South Korea) Wang C (South Korea) Jeong N-e | 21 | 21
(Singapore) A Tan (Singapore) J Hooi | 19 | 19
7 | (France) F Delrue (France) J Moinard | 21 | 21

Fourth round
9 | (South Korea) Wang C (South Korea) Jeong N-e | 21 | 21
7 | (France) F Delrue (France) J Moinard | 16 | 18

==== Section 6 ====
First round
(Australia) Teoh K C (Australia) A Yu | 6 | 17
(South Korea) Ki D-j (South Korea) Kim A-y | 21 | 21
(Denmark) S Gronbjerg (Denmark) F Ravn | 21 | 21
(Sri Lanka) N Punchihewa (Sri Lanka) V Edirisinghe | 12 | 15
(England) R Easton (England) H Warner | 21 | 21
(Mexico) L A Montoya (Mexico) A Quinones | 19 | 17
(Mongolia) S Ankhbat (Mongolia) B Batbayar | 10 | 8
(Chinese Taipei) Cheng K-w (Chinese Taipei) Tung C-t | 21 | 21
(Guyana) T Jeffrey (Guyana) P Ramdhani | 12 | 18
(Macau) Leong I C (Macau) Cheong I T | 21 | 21
(Germany) M Kicklitz (Germany) T P Nguyen | 10 | 21
(Japan) Y Takei (Japan) R Yoshida | 21 | 23

Second round
(South Korea) Ki D-j (South Korea) Kim A-y | 21 | 21
(Denmark) S Gronbjerg (Denmark) F Ravn | 13 | 16
(England) R Easton (England) H Warner | 21 | 21
13 | (France) M Briot (France) A Desmons | 16 | 14
(Chinese Taipei) Cheng K-w (Chinese Taipei) Tung C-t | 21 | 21
(Macau) Leong I C (Macau) Cheong I T | 11 | 12
(Japan) Y Takei (Japan) R Yoshida | 14 | 14
4 | (Indonesia) G A Prihardika (Indonesia) L A Kusumawati | 21 | 21

Third round
(South Korea) Ki D-j (South Korea) Kim A-y | 21 | 21
(England) R Easton (England) H Warner | 16 | 10
(Chinese Taipei) Cheng K-w (Chinese Taipei) Tung C-t | 15 | 11
4 | (Indonesia) G A Prihardika (Indonesia) L A Kusumawati | 21 | 21

Fourth round
(South Korea) Ki D-j (South Korea) Kim A-y | 21 | 16 | 7
4 | (Indonesia) G A Prihardika (Indonesia) L A Kusumawati | 19 | 21 | 21

==== Section 7 ====
First round
(France) K Lovang (France) M Le Turdu | 14 | 21 | 20
(Sweden) M Z-Bexell (Sweden) T Sjoo | 21 | 19 | 22
(Thailand) R Oupthong (Thailand) P Khantaruangsakul | 21 | 21
(Austria) N Rudolf (Austria) S Au Yeong | 14 | 13
(Canada) B Yang (Canada) K Ho-Shue | 21 | 21
(Scotland) J Apiliga (Scotland) R Sugden | 19 | 12
(Ukraine) M Makhnovskiy (Ukraine) A Prozorova | 10 | 12
(Malaysia) Choong H J (Malaysia) P Tan | 21 | 21
(Hong Kong) Ko S H (Hong Kong) Leung Y Y | 21 | 21
(Slovakia) A Antoska (Slovakia) A Remenova | 12 | 8
(Spain) A Leal (Spain) L Solis | 18 | 5
(Japan) T Kawamura (Japan) C Uchiyama | 21 | 21

Second round
(Sweden) M Z-Bexell (Sweden) T Sjoo | 13 | 16
(Thailand) R Oupthong (Thailand) P Khantaruangsakul | 21 | 21
(Canada) B Yang (Canada) K Ho-Shue | 14 | 22 | 21
12 | (Thailand) W Phakrajung (Thailand) C Korepap | 21 | 20 | 14
(Malaysia) Choong H J (Malaysia) P Tan | 22 | 21
(Hong Kong) Ko S H (Hong Kong) Leung Y Y | 20 | 17
(Japan) T Kawamura (Japan) C Uchiyama | 21 | 21
5 | (China) Di ZJ (China) Li YJ | 19 | 17

Third round
(Thailand) R Oupthong (Thailand) P Khantaruangsakul | 21 | 21
(Canada) B Yang (Canada) K Ho-Shue | 18 | 15
(Malaysia) Choong H J (Malaysia) P Tan | 21 | 21
(Japan) T Kawamura (Japan) C Uchiyama | 12 | 13

Fourth round
(Thailand) R Oupthong (Thailand) P Khantaruangsakul | 19 | 14
(Malaysia) Choong H J (Malaysia) P Tan | 21 | 21

==== Section 8 ====
First round
(Norway) M Barth (Norway) S Macsali | 19 | 21 | 21
(Peru) N Macias (Peru) M F Castillo | 21 | 16 | 14
(Canada) K To (Canada) C Lai | 21 | 21
(Poland) K Budny (Poland) D Kwasnik | 9 | 6
(Norway) B Norden (Norway) M Christensen | 10 | 4
(South Korea) Kim S-h (South Korea) Jang E-s | 21 | 21
(Uganda) B Kasirye (Uganda) T Naluwooza | 4 | 19
(Mexico) A Gaitan (Mexico) J J Bautista | 21 | 21
(Australia) R Venpin (Australia) K Ea | 21 | 21
(Faroe Islands) J Djurhuus (Faroe Islands) S Thomsen | 4 | 8

Second round
(Norway) M Barth (Norway) S Macsali | 13 | 18
(Canada) K To (Canada) C Lai | 21 | 21
(South Korea) Kim S-h (South Korea) Jang E-s | 21 | 21
14 | (Netherlands) W van der Aar (Netherlands) A Tirtosentono | 15 | 10
(Mexico) A Gaitan (Mexico) J J Bautista | 21 | 21
(Australia) R Venpin (Australia) K Ea | 14 | 17
(England) W Jones (England) A Chaudhari | 9 | 14
2 | (Indonesia) R N Kusharjanto (Indonesia) S F S Ramadhanti | 21 | 21

Third round
(Canada) K To (Canada) C Lai | 21 | 8 | 8
(South Korea) Kim S-h (South Korea) Jang E-s | 18 | 21 | 21
(Mexico) A Gaitan (Mexico) J J Bautista | 8 | 4
2 | (Indonesia) R N Kusharjanto (Indonesia) S F S Ramadhanti | 21 | 21

Fourth round
(South Korea) Kim S-h (South Korea) Jang E-s | 18 | 21 | 15
2 | (Indonesia) R N Kusharjanto (Indonesia) S F S Ramadhanti | 21 | 15 | 21
