= 2018 Badminton Asia Junior Championships – Mixed doubles =

Tournament details
- Dates: 18–22 July 2017
- Edition: 21
- Venue: Jaya Raya Sports Hall Training Center
- Location: Jakarta, Indonesia

The mixed doubles tournament of the 2018 Badminton Asia Junior Championships was held from July 18 to 22. The defending champion of the last edition were Rehan Naufal Kusharjanto and Siti Fadia Silva Ramadhanti from Indonesia. Kusharjanto / Ramadhanti of Indonesia and Guo Xinwa / Liu Xuanxuan of China are the top 2 seeded this year.

== Seeded ==
1. (Indonesia) Rehan Naufal Kusharjanto / Siti Fadia Silva Ramadhanti (quarterfinals)
2. (China) Guo Xinwa / Liu Xuanxuan (champions)
3. (Japan) Hiroki Midorikawa / Natsu Saito (third round)
4. (Malaysia) Chang Yee Jun / Pearly Tan Koong Le (third round)
5. (China) Liu Shiwen / Zhang Shuxian (third round)
6. (South Korea) Wang Chan / Jeong Na-eun (final)
7. (China) Shang Yichen / Li Yijing (quarterfinals)
8. (Indonesia) Pramudya Kusumawardana / Ribka Sugiarto (quarterfinals)

== Draw ==
=== Finals ===
Quarterfinals
1	(Indonesia) Rehan Naufal Kusharjanto (Indonesia) Siti Fadia Silva Ramadhanti	21	16	18
6	(South Korea) Wang Chan (South Korea) Jeong Na-eun	16	21	21
(South Korea) Ki Dong-ju (South Korea) Lee Eun-ji	21	21
(Chinese Taipei) Wei Chun-wei (Chinese Taipei) Li Zi-qing	17	12
7	(China) Shang Yichen (China) Li Yijing	21	18	12
(South Korea) Shin Tae-yang (South Korea) Lee Jung-hyun	17	21	21
8	(Indonesia) Pramudya Kusumawardana (Indonesia) Ribka Sugiarto	14	20
2	(China) Guo Xinwa (China) Liu Xuanxuan	21	22

Semifinals
6	(South Korea) Wang Chan (South Korea) Jeong Na-eun	17	22	21
(South Korea) Ki Dong-ju (South Korea) Lee Eun-ji	21	20	9
(South Korea) Shin Tae-yang (South Korea) Lee Jung-hyun	13	10
2	(China) Guo Xinwa (China) Liu Xuanxuan	21	21

Final
6	(South Korea) Wang Chan (South Korea) Jeong Na-eun	21	19	15
2	(China) Guo Xinwa (China) Liu Xuanxuan	15	21	21

=== Top half ===
==== Section 1 ====
First round
(Chinese Taipei) Chang H-c (Chinese Taipei) Hung E-t	19	17
(China) Guo RH (China) Lin FL	21	21
(Malaysia) Chua Y C (Malaysia) Eng S J	21	22
(Hong Kong) Chow H L (Hong Kong) Leung S L	17	20
(Singapore) Toh H Z (Singapore) B Lim	16	17
(Thailand) R Makkasasithorn (Thailand) S Chueboca	21	21

Second round
1	(Indonesia) R N Kusharjanto (Indonesia) S F S Ramadhanti	21	21
(Japan) Y Takei (Japan) R Yoshida	16	13
(Sri Lanka) T N Ambegoda (Sri Lanka) A Masakorala	11	11
(China) Guo RH (China) Lin FL	21	21
6	(South Korea) Wang C (South Korea) Jeong N-e	21	21
(Malaysia) Chua Y C (Malaysia) Eng S J	18	15
(Myanmar) Kaung M H (Myanmar) Wai W	7	9
(Thailand) R Makkasasithorn (Thailand) S Chueboca	21	21

Third round
1	(Indonesia) R N Kusharjanto (Indonesia) S F S Ramadhanti	21	21
(China) Guo RH (China) Lin FL	14	14
6	(South Korea) Wang C (South Korea) Jeong N-e	21	21
(Thailand) R Makkasasithorn (Thailand) S Chueboca	8	16

Quarterfinal
1	(Indonesia) R N Kusharjanto (Indonesia) S F S Ramadhanti	21	16	18
6	(South Korea) Wang C (South Korea) Jeong N-e	16	21	21

==== Section 2 ====
First round
(Thailand) A Teerawiwat (Thailand) P Chaiwan	19	10
(Indonesia) A R Mauthuthihona (Indonesia) R V Salsabila	21	21
(South Korea) Ki D-j (South Korea) Lee E-j	21	21
(Kazakhstan) K Tajbullayev (Kazakhstan) A Zhumabek	3	7
(Indonesia) M J Elgiffani (Indonesia) W S Mulyani	17	21	21
(India) S S K Podile (India) S Jupudi	21	13	15
(Mongolia) T Gombodorj (Mongolia) O Amartaivan
(Hong Kong) Ko S H (Hong Kong) Lui L L	w	/	o

Second round
4	(Malaysia) Chang Y J (Malaysia) P Tan	21	28
(Indonesia) A R Mauthuthihona (Indonesia) R V Salsabila	14	26
(Japan) M Ikebata (Japan) K Osawa	17	11
(South Korea) Ki D-j (South Korea) Lee E-j	21	21
5	(China) Liu SW (China) Zhang SX	22	21	21
(Indonesia) M J Elgiffani (Indonesia) W S Mulyani	24	17	19
(Chinese Taipei) Wei C-w (Chinese Taipei) Li Z-q	21	21
(Hong Kong) Ko S H (Hong Kong) Lui L L	13	13

Third round
4	(Malaysia) Chang Y J (Malaysia) P Tan	15	19
(South Korea) Ki D-j (South Korea) Lee E-j	21	21
5	(China) Liu SW (China) Zhang SX	19	19
(Chinese Taipei) Wei C-w (Chinese Taipei) Li Z-q	21	21

Quarterfinal
(South Korea) Ki D-j (South Korea) Lee E-j	21	21
(Chinese Taipei) Wei C-w (Chinese Taipei) Li Z-q	17	12

=== Bottom half ===
==== Section 3 ====
First round
(Indonesia) L R Carnando (Indonesia) M I Cindiani	21	10
(Chinese Taipei) Wu G-x (Chinese Taipei) Teng C-h	23	21
(Malaysia) Choong H J (Malaysia) Toh E W	21	21
(Sri Lanka) C Dias (Sri Lanka) D Dias	16	2
(Hong Kong) J Gunawan (Hong Kong) Tsang H Y	12	18
(Indonesia) G A Prihardika (Indonesia) L A Kusumawati	21	21
(Macau) Leong I C (Macau) Wong C W	5	8
(Thailand) W Phakjarung (Thailand) C Korepap	21	21

Second round
(Chinese Taipei) Wu G-x (Chinese Taipei) Teng C-h	21	21
(India) E Joy (India) N S Siraj	17	13
(Malaysia) Choong H J (Malaysia) Toh E W	12	26	15
7	(China) Shang YC (China) Li YJ	21	24	21
(Indonesia) G A Prihardika (Indonesia) L A Kusumawati	21	12	17
(South Korea) Shin T-y (South Korea) Lee J-h	11	21	21
(Thailand) W Phakjarung (Thailand) C Korepap	13	15
3	(Japan) H Midorikawa (Japan) N Saito	21	21

Third round
(Chinese Taipei) Wu G-x (Chinese Taipei) Teng C-h	21	19	21
7	(China) Shang YC (China) Li YJ	19	21	23
(South Korea) Shin T-y (South Korea) Lee J-h	16	21	21
3	(Japan) H Midorikawa (Japan) N Saito	21	17	19

Quarterfinal
7	(China) Shang YC (China) Li YJ	21	18	12
(South Korea) Shin T-y (South Korea) Lee J-h	17	21	21

==== Section 4 ====
First round
(Sri Lanka) V Fernando (Sri Lanka) J Amanda	12	11
(Hong Kong) Lui C W (Hong Kong) Yeung P L	21	21
(India) O Chaliha (India) P Konadam	15	18
(Chinese Taipei) Lin Y-c (Chinese Taipei) Cheng Y-p	21	21
(Mongolia) S Enkhbat (Mongolia) K Darkhanbaatar
(Kazakhstan) D Panarin (Kazakhstan) I Gordeyeva	w	/	o
(Japan) T Kawamoto (Japan) S Fukumoto	16	21	23
(Thailand) S Piyawatcharavijit (Thailand) P Suwatnodom	21	19	21

Second round
(Hong Kong) Lui C W (Hong Kong) Yeung P L	21	21
(Malaysia) Lwi S H (Malaysia) Teoh L X	10	19
(Chinese Taipei) Lin Y-c (Chinese Taipei) Cheng Y-p	14	16
8	(Indonesia) P Kusumawardana (Indonesia) R Sugiarto	21	21
(Kazakhstan) D Panarin (Kazakhstan) I Gordeyeva	4	11
(South Korea) Kim S-h (South Korea) Jang E-s	21	21
(Japan) T Kawamoto (Japan) S Fukumoto	13	13
2	(China) Guo XW (China) Liu XX	21	21

Third round
(Hong Kong) Lui C W (Hong Kong) Yeung P L	19	18
8	(Indonesia) P Kusumawardana (Indonesia) R Sugiarto	21	21
(South Korea) Kim S-h (South Korea) Jang E-s	21	19	11
2	(China) Guo XW (China) Liu XX	18	21	21

Quarterfinal
8	(Indonesia) P Kusumawardana (Indonesia) R Sugiarto	14	20
2	(China) Guo XW (China) Liu XX	21	22
