= Jafar Hidayatullah =

Indonesian badminton player (born 2003)

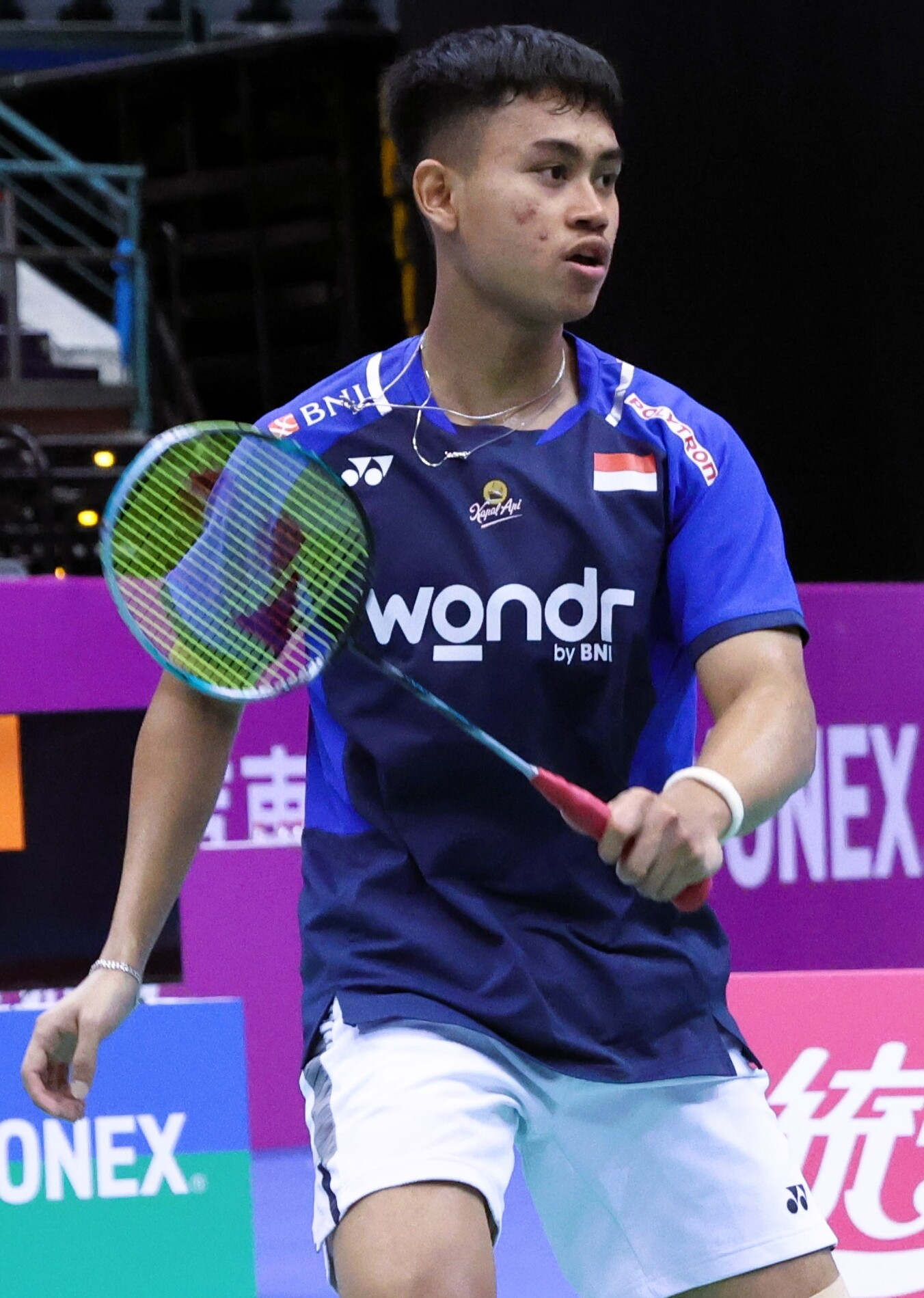
- Hidayatullah at the 2025 Taipei Open

Personal information
- Born: 9 January 2003 (age 23) Tangerang, Banten, Indonesia
- Height: 170 cm (5 ft 7 in)
- Weight: 65 kg (143 lb)

Sport
- Country: Indonesia
- Sport: Badminton
- Handedness: Left

Mixed doubles
- Highest ranking: 9 (with Felisha Pasaribu, 13 January 2026); 41 (with Aisyah Pranata, 1 June 2023)
- Current ranking: 23 (with Felisha Pasaribu, 27 October 2026)
- BWF profile
Medal record
Men's badminton
Representing Indonesia
Asian Championships
Bronze medal – third place	2025 Ningbo	Mixed doubles
SEA Games
Gold medal – first place	2025 Thailand	Men's team
Bronze medal – third place	2025 Thailand	Mixed doubles

Jafar Hidayatullah (born 9 January 2003) is an Indonesian badminton player affiliated with Rajawali badminton club. He is a bronze medalists in the mixed doubles at the 2025 Asian Championships.

== Personal life ==
Hidayatullah is the brother of fellow badminton athlete, Febi Setianingrum.

== Career ==
=== 2022 ===
In 2022, Jafar Hidayatullah was paired with Aisyah Pranata. They lost from Chinese pair Cheng Xing and Chen Fanghui in the semi-finals of the Indonesia Masters Super 100.

=== 2023 ===
In January, Hidayatullah with Pranata competed in the home tournament, Indonesia Masters, but unfortunately lost in the quarter-finals from Chinese pair and eventual winner Feng Yanzhe and Huang Dongping.

In March, Hidayatullah won his first title at the Vietnam International, defeating Thai pair Tanupat Viriyangkura and Ornnicha Jongsathapornparn.

In May, Hidayatullah won his second title at the Swedish Open, defeating Danish pair Sebastian Bugtrup and Mai Surrow. In late May, he competed in the Thailand Open, but lost in the qualifying round from Taiwanese pair Chiu Hsiang-chieh and Lin Xiao-min.

In June, Hidayatullah competed in the Taipei Open, but lost in the quarter-finals from eventual finalist Taiwanese pair Chiu Hsiang-chieh and Lin Xiao-min for second time this season.

In September, Hidayatullah as the 3rd seed lost at the first round of Indonesia Masters Super 100 I from Thai pair Phatharathorn Nipornram and Nattamon Laisuan in rubber games.

=== 2025 ===
In April, Hidayatullah made an impressive run as semifinalist at Asia Championships with his new partner, Felisha Pasaribu by beating the seventh seed Cheng Xing and Zhang Chi at the first round and third seed Goh Soon Huat and Lai Shevon Jemie at the quarterfinal. They went to win Taipei Open defeated their compatriots Dejan Ferdinansyah and Siti Fadia Silva Ramadhanti. At Japan Open, they defeated All England's champions Guo Xinwa and Chen Fanghui but lost to Chen Tang Jie and Toh Ee Wei. They avenged their Asia Championships defeat by beating Hiroki Midorikawa and Natsu Saito at the first round of China Masters but lost the next round to the reigning world champion's Chen Tang Jie and Toh Ee Wei. They reached the final in Australian Open but losing out again to the Chen and Toh. In December, he competed in the SEA Games, and won the gold medal in the team event.

== Achievements ==
=== Asian Championships ===
Mixed doubles
Year	Venue	Partner	Opponent	Score	Result	Ref.
2025	Ningbo Olympic Sports Center Gymnasium; Ningbo, China	(Indonesia) Felisha Pasaribu	(Japan) Hiroki Midorikawa (Japan) Natsu Saito	21–15, 21–23, 11–21	Bronze	

=== SEA Games ===
Mixed doubles
Year	Venue	Partner	Opponent	Score	Result	Ref.
2025	Gymnasium 4, Thammasat University Rangsit Campus; Pathum Thani, Thailand	(Indonesia) Felisha Pasaribu	(Thailand) Dechapol Puavaranukroh (Thailand) Supissara Paewsampran	17–21, 15–21	Bronze	

=== BWF World Tour (3 titles, 1 runner-up) ===
The BWF World Tour, which was announced on 19 March 2017 and implemented in 2018, is a series of elite badminton tournaments sanctioned by the Badminton World Federation (BWF). The BWF World Tours are divided into levels of World Tour Finals, Super 1000, Super 750, Super 500, Super 300, and the BWF Tour Super 100.

Mixed doubles
Year	Tournament	Level	Partner	Opponent	Score	Result	Ref.
2023 (II)	Indonesia Masters	Super 100	(Indonesia) Aisyah Pranata	(Thailand) Ruttanapak Oupthong (Thailand) Jhenicha Sudjaipraparat	21–17, 21–19	(gold) Winner	
2024 (I)	Indonesia Masters	Super 100	(Indonesia) Felisha Pasaribu	(Indonesia) Adnan Maulana (Indonesia) Indah Cahya Sari Jamil	21–11, 21–19	(gold) Winner	
2025	Taipei Open	Super 300	(Indonesia) Felisha Pasaribu	(Indonesia) Dejan Ferdinansyah (Indonesia) Siti Fadia Silva Ramadhanti	18–21, 21–13, 21–17	(gold) Winner	
2025	Australian Open	Super 500	(Indonesia) Felisha Pasaribu	(Malaysia) Chen Tang Jie (Malaysia) Toh Ee Wei	16–21, 11–21	(silver) Runner-up	

=== BWF International Challenge/Series (4 titles) ===
Mixed doubles
Year	Tournament	Partner	Opponent	Score	Result	Ref.
2023	Vietnam International	(Indonesia) Aisyah Pranata	(Thailand) Tanupat Viriyangkura (Thailand) Ornnicha Jongsathapornparn	19–21, 21–14, 22–20	(gold) Winner	
2023	Swedish Open	(Indonesia) Aisyah Pranata	(Denmark) Sebastian Bugtrup (Denmark) Mai Surrow	21–19, 19–21, 21–13	(gold) Winner	
2024 (I)	Indonesia International	(Indonesia) Felisha Pasaribu	(Indonesia) Adnan Maulana (Indonesia) Indah Cahya Sari Jamil	21–18, 21–10	(gold) Winner	
2024 (II)	Indonesia International	(Indonesia) Felisha Pasaribu	(Indonesia) Amri Syahnawi (Indonesia) Nita Violina Marwah	21–13, 21–15	(gold) Winner	

BWF International Challenge tournament
BWF International Series tournament

== Performance timeline ==
Key

W	Won	F	Finalist	SF	Semi-finalist
QF	Quarter-finalist	#R	Rounds 4, 3, 2, 1	RR	Round-robin stage
Q#	Qualification round	A	Absent	w/d	Withdrew
G	Gold	S	Silver	B	Bronze
NH	Not held	N/A	Not applicable	DNQ	Did not qualify

=== National team ===
- Senior level

Team event	2025	Ref
SEA Games	G	

=== Individual competitions ===
==== Senior level ====
===== Mixed doubles =====
Events	2025	2026	Ref
SEA Games	B	NH	
Asian Championships	B	2R	
World Championships	3R	Dec.	

Tournament	BWF World Tour					Best	Ref
Tournament	2022	2023	2024	2025	2026	Best	Ref
Malaysia Open	A				1R	1R ('26)	
Indonesia Masters	A	QF	1R	2R	SF	SF ('26)	
Thailand Masters	NH	A	1R	SF	w/d	SF ('25)	
German Open	A			QF	A	QF ('25)	
All England Open	A				2R	2R ('26)	
Swiss Open	A		Q2	A	QF	QF ('26)	
Orléans Masters	A			2R	A	2R ('25)	
Thailand Open	A	Q1	QF	2R	2R	QF ('24)	
Malaysia Masters	A		1R	A	1R	1R ('24, '26)	
Singapore Open	A			QF	A	QF ('25)	
Indonesia Open	A			2R	2R	2R ('25, '26)	
Australian Open	A		2R	F	A	F ('25)	
Japan Open	A			2R	A	2R ('25)	
China Open	NH	A		SF	A	SF ('25)	
Taipei Open	A	QF	A	W	A	W ('25)	
China Masters	NH	A		2R	A	2R ('25)	
Indonesia Masters Super 100	SF	1R	W	A		W ('23^{II}, '24^{I})	
Indonesia Masters Super 100	SF	W	SF	A		W ('23^{II}, '24^{I})	
Vietnam Open	A		QF	A		QF ('24)	
Denmark Open	A			1R	A	1R ('25)	
French Open	A			2R	A	2R ('25)	
Hylo Open	A			QF	A	QF ('25)	
Korea Open	A			2R	1R	2R ('25)	
Kaohsiung Masters	NH	A			SF	SF ('26)	
Hong Kong Open	NH	A		2R	A	2R ('25)	
Syed Modi International	A				Q	('26)	
Guwahati Masters	NH	1R	A			1R ('23)	
World Tour Finals	DNQ			RR	DNQ	RR ('25)	
Spain Masters	NH	A	2R	NH		2R ('24)	
Year-end ranking	84	51	63	10		9	
Tournament	2022	2023	2024	2025	2026	Best	Ref
