= Jeong Na-eun =

South Korean badminton player (born 2000)

- Jeong at the 2026 Kaohsiung Masters

Personal information
- Born: 27 June 2000 (age 26) Seoul, South Korea
- Height: 1.67 m (5 ft 6 in)

Sport
- Country: South Korea
- Sport: Badminton
- Handedness: Right

Women's and mixed doubles
- Highest ranking: 3 (WD with Kim Hye-jeong, 27 December 2022); 3 (XD with Kim Won-ho, 31 December 2024)
- Current ranking: 48 (WD with Lee Yeon-woo, 6 October 2026)
- BWF profile
Medal record
Women's badminton
Representing South Korea
Olympic Games
Silver medal – second place	2024 Paris	Mixed doubles
Sudirman Cup
Silver medal – second place	2023 Suzhou	Mixed team
Silver medal – second place	2025 Xiamen	Mixed team
Uber Cup
Gold medal – first place	2022 Bangkok	Women's team
Gold medal – first place	2026 Horsens	Women's team
Bronze medal – third place	2024 Chengdu	Women's team
Asian Games
Gold medal – first place	2022 Hangzhou	Women's team
Bronze medal – third place	2026 Aichi–Nagoya	Women's team
Asia Mixed Team Championships
Silver medal – second place	2023 Dubai	Mixed team
World Junior Championships
Silver medal – second place	2018 Markham	Mixed team
Bronze medal – third place	2018 Markham	Mixed doubles
Asian Junior Championships
Silver medal – second place	2018 Jakarta	Mixed doubles

Jeong Na-eun (Korean: 정나은; born 27 June 2000) is a South Korean badminton player affiliated with Hwasun County team. She was the silver medalist in the mixed doubles at the 2024 Summer Olympics. She was part of Korean winning team in the 2022 and 2026 Uber Cup, as well at the 2022 Asian Games. Jeong reached a career-high as world number 3 in women's doubles with Kim Hye-jeong and in mixed doubles with Kim Won-ho.

In her junior, Jeong won a bronze medal at the 2018 World Junior Championships and a silver at the Asian Junior Championships with her partner Wang Chan.

== Career ==
Partnered with Kim Hye-jeong, they reached the finals of the Indonesia Masters in 2021 but lost to Nami Matsuyama and Chiharu Shida of Japan.

In 2022, they were semi-finalists at the All England Open. Months later, they would go onto win the Korea Open by beating Benyapa Aimsaard and Nuntakarn Aimsaard with a score of 21–16, 21–12. She was part of the South Korean team that won gold in the 2022 Uber Cup.

In 2026, Jeong competed in the Uber Cup with the Korean team, which went on to become champions after the team defeating China in the final.

== Achievements ==
=== Olympic Games ===
Mixed doubles
Year	Venue	Partner	Opponent	Score	Result
2024	Porte de La Chapelle Arena, Paris, France	(South Korea) Kim Won-ho	(China) Zheng Siwei (China) Huang Yaqiong	8–21, 11–21	Silver

=== BWF World Junior Championships ===
Mixed doubles
Year	Venue	Partner	Opponent	Score	Result
2018	Markham Pan Am Centre; Markham, Canada	(South Korea) Wang Chan	(Indonesia) Rehan Naufal Kusharjanto (Indonesia) Siti Fadia Silva Ramadhanti	18–21, 18–21	Bronze

=== Asian Junior Championships ===
Mixed doubles
Year	Venue	Partner	Opponent	Score	Result
2018	Jaya Raya Sports Hall Training Center; Jakarta, Indonesia	(South Korea) Wang Chan	(China) Guo Xinwa (China) Liu Xuanxuan	21–15, 19–21, 15–21	Silver

=== BWF World Tour (6 titles, 7 runners-up) ===
The BWF World Tour, which was announced on 19 March 2017 and implemented in 2018, is a series of elite badminton tournaments sanctioned by the Badminton World Federation (BWF). The BWF World Tour is divided into levels of World Tour Finals, Super 1000, Super 750, Super 500, Super 300, and the BWF Tour Super 100.

Women's doubles
Year	Tournament	Level	Partner	Opponent	Score	Result
2021	Indonesia Masters	Super 750	(South Korea) Kim Hye-jeong	(Japan) Nami Matsuyama (Japan) Chiharu Shida	9–21, 11–21	(silver) Runner-up
2022	Korea Open	Super 500	(South Korea) Kim Hye-jeong	(Thailand) Benyapa Aimsaard (Thailand) Nuntakarn Aimsaard	21–16, 21–12	(gold) Winner
2022	Japan Open	Super 750	(South Korea) Kim Hye-jeong	(South Korea) Baek Ha-na (South Korea) Lee Yu-lim	23–21, 28–26	(gold) Winner
2023	Korea Masters	Super 300	(South Korea) Kim Hye-jeong	(Japan) Rui Hirokami (Japan) Yuna Kato	21–12, 21–19	(gold) Winner
2024	Korea Open	Super 500	(South Korea) Kim Hye-jeong	(Malaysia) Pearly Tan (Malaysia) Thinaah Muralitharan	21–12, 21–11	(gold) Winner
2025	Thailand Open	Super 500	(South Korea) Lee Yeon-woo	(Malaysia) Pearly Tan (Malaysia) Thinaah Muralitharan	16–21, 17–21	(silver) Runner-up

Mixed doubles
Year	Tournament	Level	Partner	Opponent	Score	Result
2022	Australian Open	Super 300	(South Korea) Kim Won-ho	(South Korea) Seo Seung-jae (South Korea) Chae Yoo-jung	9–21, 17–21	(silver) Runner-up
2023	German Open	Super 300	(South Korea) Kim Won-ho	(China) Feng Yanzhe (China) Huang Dongping	4–21, 15–21	(silver) Runner-up
2023	Thailand Open	Super 500	(South Korea) Kim Won-ho	(Thailand) Dechapol Puavaranukroh (Thailand) Sapsiree Taerattanachai	11–21, 21–19, 22–20	(gold) Winner
2024	Malaysia Open	Super 1000	(South Korea) Kim Won-ho	(Japan) Yuta Watanabe (Japan) Arisa Higashino	18–21, 15–21	(silver) Runner-up
2024	German Open	Super 300	(South Korea) Kim Won-ho	(Hong Kong) Tang Chun Man (Hong Kong) Tse Ying Suet	13–21, 19–21	(silver) Runner-up
2025	Korea Masters	Super 300	(South Korea) Kim Jae-hyeon	(Malaysia) Jimmy Wong (Malaysia) Lai Pei Jing	24–22, 21–18	(gold) Winner
2026	Kaohsiung Masters	Super 100	(South Korea) Ki Dong-ju	(Malaysia) Wee Yee Hern (Malaysia) Vannee Gobi	22–24, 17–21	(silver) Runner-up

=== BWF International Challenge/Series (2 titles, 2 runners-up) ===
Women's doubles
Year	Tournament	Partner	Opponent	Score	Result
2019	Mongolia International	(South Korea) Jang Eun-seo	(Singapore) Shinta Mulia Sari (Singapore) Crystal Wong	21–15, 19–21, 18–21	(silver) Runner-up

Mixed doubles
Year	Tournament	Partner	Opponent	Score	Result
2019	Osaka International	(South Korea) Kim Won-ho	(China) Guo Xinwa (China) Zhang Shuxian	21–17, 21–15	(gold) Winner
2026	Phuket International	(South Korea) Cho Song-hyun	(Thailand) Ratchapol Makkasasithorn (Thailand) Nattamon Laisuan	17–21, 15–21	(silver) Runner-up
2026	Saipan International	(South Korea) Cho Song-hyun	(Japan) Yuto Nakashizu (Japan) Mao Yamakita	21–13, 21–15	(gold) Winner

BWF International Challenge tournament
BWF International Series tournament
BWF Future Series tournament
