= Ki Dong-ju =

South Korean badminton player (born 2001)

Ki Dong-ju 기동주
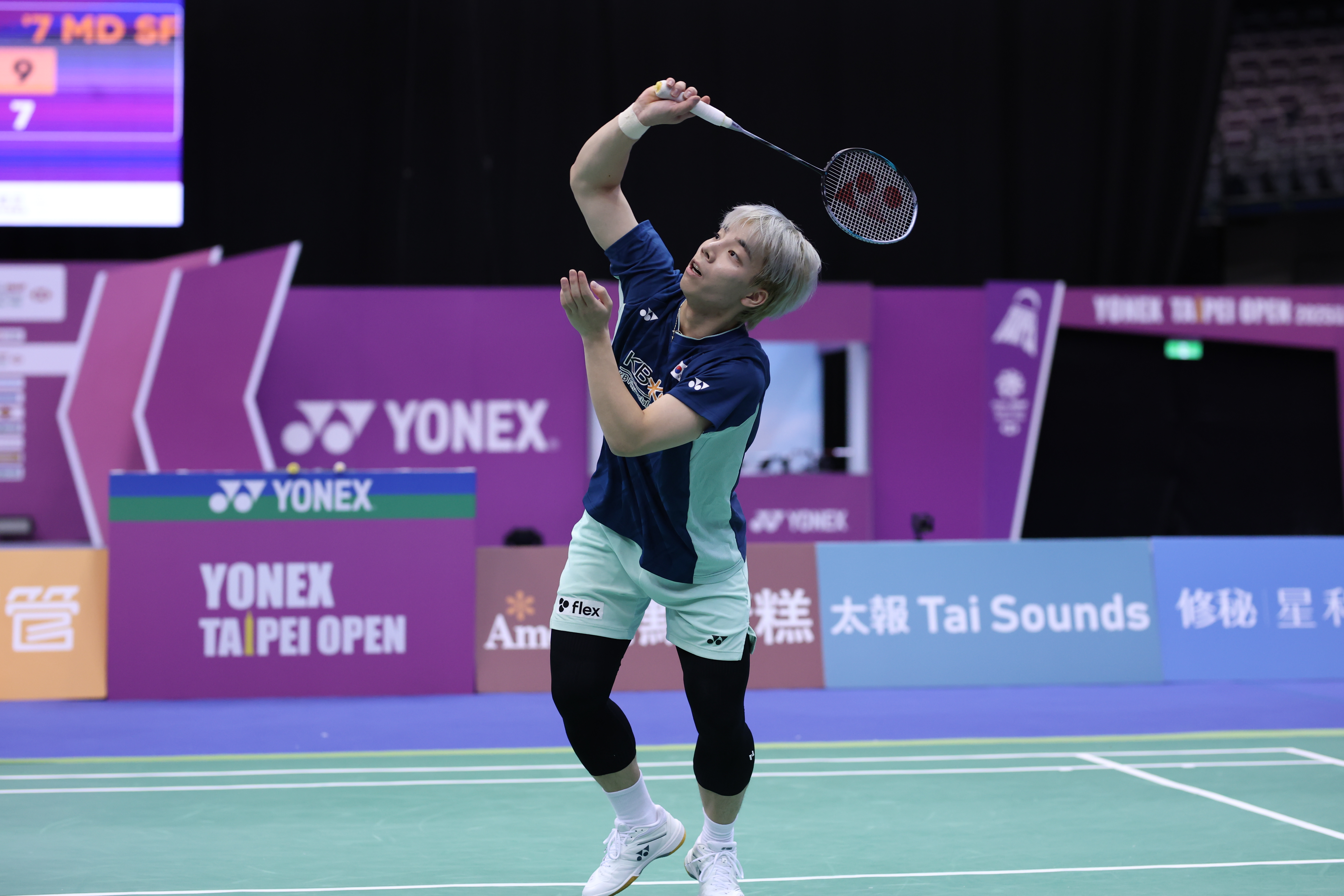
- Ki at the 2025 Taipei Open

Personal information
- Born: 12 April 2001 (age 25) Gwangmyeong, South Korea
- Height: 1.74 m (5 ft 9 in)

Sport
- Country: South Korea
- Sport: Badminton
- Handedness: Right

Men's & mixed doubles
- Highest ranking: 9 (MD with Kang Min-hyuk, 20 October 2026); 79 (XD with Jeong Na-eun, 17 June 2025)
- Current ranking: 11 (MD with Kang Min-hyuk, 10 November 2026)
- BWF profile
Medal record
Men's badminton
Representing South Korea
Sudirman Cup
Silver medal – second place	2025 Xiamen	Mixed team
Asian Championships
Silver medal – second place	2026 Ningbo	Men's doubles
Asia Team Championships
Bronze medal – third place	2024 Selangor	Men's team
Bronze medal – third place	2026 Qingdao	Men's team
World Junior Championships
Silver medal – second place	2018 Markham	Mixed team
Bronze medal – third place	2017 Yogyakarta	Mixed team
Asian Junior Championships
Bronze medal – third place	2018 Jakarta	Mixed doubles
Bronze medal – third place	2019 Suzhou	Mixed team

Ki Dong-ju (Korean: 기동주; born 12 April 2001) is a South Korean badminton player affiliated with Incheon Skymons International Airport team. He was part of South Korean team that won the silver medal in the 2018 BWF World Junior Championships. He won his first BWF World Tour title at the 2025 Orléans Masters with Kang Min-hyuk.

== Career ==
In 2022, Ki partnered with Kim Hye-rin finished runner-up in the mixed doubles at the Mongolia International.

In 2023, Ki with Kim Jae-hwan became a runner-up in the men's doubles at the Indonesia International.

In 2024, Ki won his first BWF International Challenge title in the Indonesia International, after he and his men's doubles partner, Kim Jae-hyeon, beating host pair Raymond Indra and Patra Harapan Rindorindo in straight game.

In 2025, Ki claimed his first ever World Tour title in the Orléans Masters together with his senior doubles partner Kang Min-hyuk. He managed to score another final in Taipei Open but lost to the local pair of Chiu Hsiang-chieh and Wang Chi-lin.

== Achievements ==
=== Asian Championships ===
Men's doubles
Year	Venue	Partner	Opponent	Score	Result
2026	Ningbo Olympic Sports Center Gymnasium, Ningbo, China	(South Korea) Kang Min-hyuk	(South Korea) Kim Won-ho (South Korea) Seo Seung-jae	13–21, 17–21	Silver

=== Asian Junior Championships ===
Mixed doubles
Year	Venue	Partner	Opponent	Score	Result
2018	Jaya Raya Sports Hall Training Center, Jakarta, Indonesia	(South Korea) Lee Eun-ji	(South Korea) Wang Chan (South Korea) Jeong Na-eun	21–17, 20–22, 9–21	Bronze

=== BWF World Tour (1 title, 2 runners-up) ===
The BWF World Tour, which was announced on 19 March 2017 and implemented in 2018, is a series of elite badminton tournaments sanctioned by the Badminton World Federation (BWF). The BWF World Tour is divided into levels of World Tour Finals, Super 1000, Super 750, Super 500, Super 300, and the BWF Tour Super 100.

Men's doubles
Year	Tournament	Level	Partner	Opponent	Score	Result	Ref.
2025	Orléans Masters	Super 300	(South Korea) Kang Min-hyuk	(China) Liang Weikeng (China) Wang Chang	21–13, 18–21, 21–18	(gold) Winner	
2025	Taipei Open	Super 300	(South Korea) Kang Min-hyuk	(Chinese Taipei) Chiu Hsiang-chieh (Chinese Taipei) Wang Chi-lin	18–21, 15–21	(silver) Runner-up	

Mixed doubles
Year	Tournament	Level	Partner	Opponent	Score	Result	Ref.
2026	Kaohsiung Masters	Super 100	(South Korea) Jeong Na-eun	(Malaysia) Wee Yee Hern (Malaysia) Vannee Gobi	22–24, 17–21	(silver) Runner-up	

=== BWF International Challenge/Series (1 titles, 2 runners-up) ===
Men's doubles
Year	Tournament	Partner	Opponent	Score	Result	Ref.
2023 (II)	Indonesia International	(South Korea) Kim Jae-hwan	(Japan) Kenya Mitsuhashi (Japan) Hiroki Okamura	22–20, 16–21, 8–21	(silver) Runner-up	
2024 (I)	Indonesia International	(South Korea) Kim Jae-hyeon	(Indonesia) Raymond Indra (Indonesia) Patra Harapan Rindorindo	21–15, 21–12	(gold) Winner	

Mixed doubles
Year	Tournament	Partner	Opponent	Score	Result	Ref.
2022	Mongolia International	(South Korea) Kim Hye-rin	(South Korea) Choi Hyun-beom (South Korea) Yoon Min-ah	21–13, 13–21, 15–21	(silver) Runner-up	

BWF International Challenge tournament
BWF International Series tournament
