= Chiu Hsiang-chieh =

Taiwanese badminton player (born 2002)

Chiu Hsiang-chieh 邱相榤
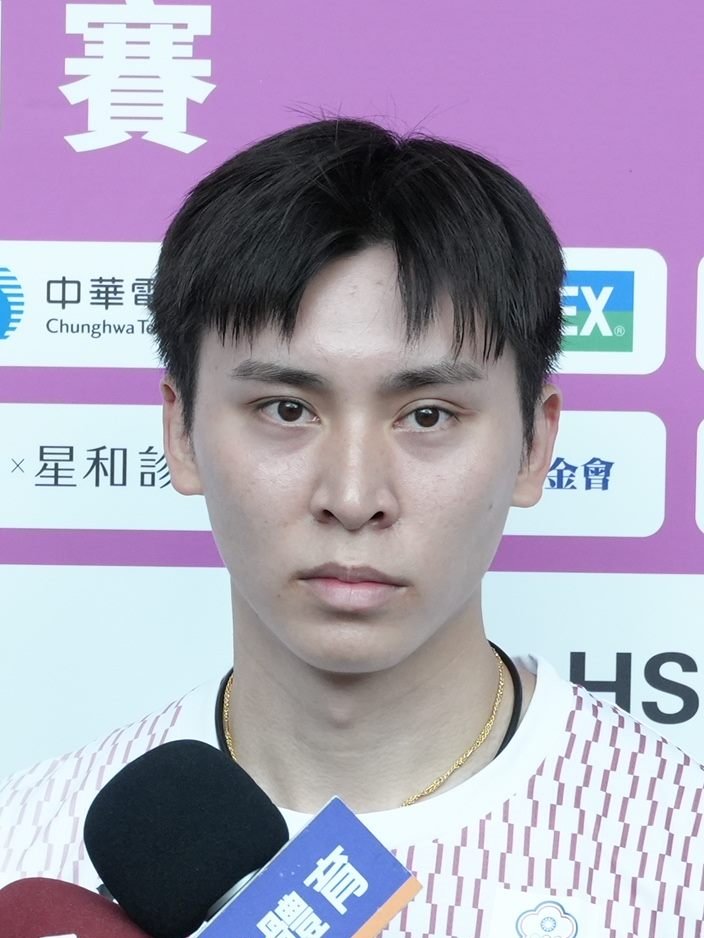
- Chiu at the 2026 Taipei Open

Personal information
- Born: 11 November 2002 (age 24) Hsinchu, Taiwan
- Height: 1.89 m (6 ft 2 in)

Sport
- Country: Republic of China (Taiwan)
- Sport: Badminton
- Handedness: Left
- Coached by: Chen Hung-ling

Men's & mixed doubles
- Highest ranking: 11 (MD with Wang Chi-lin, 10 February 2026); 37 (MD with Yang Ming-tse, 19 September 2023); 43 (XD with Lin Xiao-min, 3 October 2023)
- Current ranking: 20 (MD with Wang Chi-lin, 17 November 2026)
- BWF profile

Chiu Hsiang-chieh (Chinese: 邱相榤; pinyin: Qiū Xiāngjié; Wade–Giles: Chiu Hsiang-chieh; born 11 November 2002) is a Taiwanese badminton player. He is currently affiliated with the Land Bank of Taiwan badminton team.

== Early life and education ==
Chiu was born on 11 November 2002 in Hsinchu, Taiwan, into a sports-oriented family. His father, Chiu Wen-sheng, is a former professional baseball pitcher, and his mother studied dance. He has a younger brother, Chiu Shao-hua, who is also a badminton player.

Growing up, Chiu was exposed to various sports. Until the second grade of elementary school, he played golf. However, he broke his arm and had to stop playing for one year. After recovery, he joined his school's badminton team in third grade and fell in love with the sport. Like his father, he also played baseball. However, because he cannot tolerate the sun when playing outdoors, he chose to focus on badminton.

Originally a singles player, he switched to doubles when attending Shi-Yuan High School in Taichung. He said he likes the speed of badminton and enjoys "the back-and-forth ball speed, flat block, and fast-paced offensive and defensive mode" of doubles. He was then promoted to the first team before graduating high school. He now attends the National Taiwan University of Sport.

== Career ==
=== 2022 ===
Together with Yang Ming-tse, they won the Bonn International, Polish International, Croatian International, and Dutch Open men's doubles titles. Chiu and Yang also reached the finals of the Denmark Challenge, Bulgarian International, and Czech Open. In mixed doubles, he clinched the Polish International, Croatian International, and Bulgarian International titles with Lin Xiao-min, as well as finishing second at the Belgian International and Czech Open.

=== 2023 ===
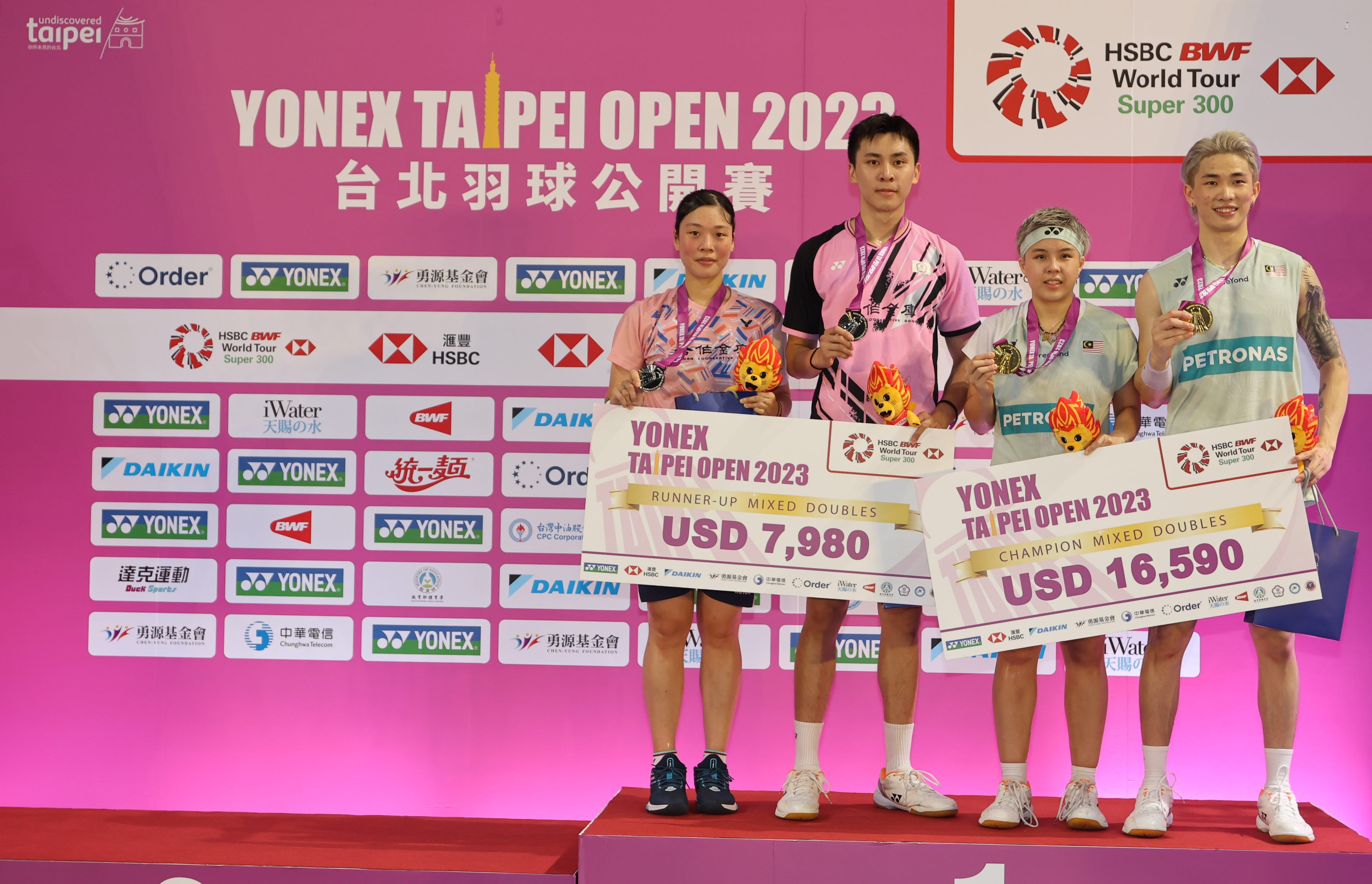
Chiu (second from left) on the 2023 Taipei Open mixed doubles podium

In June, Chiu and Lin advanced to their first BWF World Tour tournament final at their home event, the Taipei Open. They finished as the runner-up after losing to Chen Tang Jie and Toh Ee Wei in straight games.

In September, the pair made the semi-finals of the Kaohsiung Masters but lost out to the top seeds, Dejan Ferdinansyah and Gloria Emanuelle Widjaja.

=== 2024 ===
In March, he won the Vietnam International men's doubles title with Liu Kuang-heng. He also reached the mixed doubles semi-finals with Lin.

In August, Chiu was announced as the new partner for Olympic champion Wang Chi-lin following the retirement of Wang's former partner, Lee Yang. The duo's debut tournament was the Japan Open.

=== 2025 ===
In May, Chiu and Wang won their first title as a pair at their home event, the Taipei Open, without dropping a game.

In November, the pair defeated higher-ranked Sabar Karyaman Gutama and Muhammad Reza Pahlevi Isfahani in the final of the Hylo Open to win their first Super 500 title.

== Personal life ==
Chiu is in a relationship with Lo Chia-ling, a national taekwondo athlete.

He has an interest in photography.

== Achievements ==
=== BWF World Tour (2 titles, 1 runner-up) ===
The BWF World Tour, which was announced on 19 March 2017 and implemented in 2018, is a series of elite badminton tournaments sanctioned by the Badminton World Federation (BWF). The BWF World Tour is divided into levels of World Tour Finals, Super 1000, Super 750, Super 500, Super 300 (part of the HSBC World Tour), and the BWF Tour Super 100.

Men's doubles
| Year | Tournament | Level | Partner | Opponent | Score | Result |
|---|---|---|---|---|---|---|
| 2025 | Taipei Open | Super 300 | (Chinese Taipei) Wang Chi-lin | (South Korea) Kang Min-hyuk (South Korea) Ki Dong-ju | 21–18, 21–15 | (gold) Winner |
| 2025 | Hylo Open | Super 500 | (Chinese Taipei) Wang Chi-lin | (Indonesia) Sabar Karyaman Gutama (Indonesia) Muhammad Reza Pahlevi Isfahani | 21–19, 21–18 | (gold) Winner |

Mixed doubles
| Year | Tournament | Level | Partner | Opponent | Score | Result |
|---|---|---|---|---|---|---|
| 2023 | Taipei Open | Super 300 | (Chinese Taipei) Lin Xiao-min | (Malaysia) Chen Tang Jie (Malaysia) Toh Ee Wei | 12–21, 8–21 | (silver) Runner-up |

=== BWF International Challenge/Series (8 titles, 5 runners-up) ===
Men's doubles
| Year | Tournament | Partner | Opponent | Score | Result |
|---|---|---|---|---|---|
| 2022 | Denmark Masters | (Chinese Taipei) Yang Ming-tse | (South Korea) Jin Yong (South Korea) Na Sung-seung | 13–21, 16–21 | (silver) Runner-up |
| 2022 | Bonn International | (Chinese Taipei) Yang Ming-tse | (Chinese Taipei) Liao Chao-pang (Chinese Taipei) Lin Chia-yu | 21–15, 21–14 | (gold) Winner |
| 2022 | Polish International | (Chinese Taipei) Yang Ming-tse | (Japan) Masato Takano (Japan) Katsuki Tamate | 21–11, 21–15 | (gold) Winner |
| 2022 | Croatian International | (Chinese Taipei) Yang Ming-tse | (Chinese Taipei) Chen Yu-che (Chinese Taipei) Lin Bing-wei | 21–15, 21–7 | (gold) Winner |
| 2022 | Bulgarian International | (Chinese Taipei) Yang Ming-tse | (Chinese Taipei) Chiang Chien-wei (Chinese Taipei) Wu Hsuan-yi | 17–21, 21–18, 20–22 | (silver) Runner-up |
| 2022 | Dutch Open | (Chinese Taipei) Yang Ming-tse | (England) Callum Hemming (England) Ethan van Leeuwen | 21–16, 21–13 | (gold) Winner |
| 2022 | Czech Open | (Chinese Taipei) Yang Ming-tse | (Thailand) Pharanyu Kaosamaang (Thailand) Worrapol Thongsa-Nga | 15–21, 15–21 | (silver) Runner-up |
| 2024 | Vietnam International | (Chinese Taipei) Liu Kuang-heng | (Chinese Taipei) Chiang Chien-wei (Chinese Taipei) Wu Hsuan-yi | 21–12, 15–21, 21–15 | (gold) Winner |

Mixed doubles
| Year | Tournament | Partner | Opponent | Score | Result |
|---|---|---|---|---|---|
| 2022 | Belgian International | (Chinese Taipei) Lin Xiao-min | (Japan) Hiroki Midorikawa (Japan) Natsu Saito | 13–21, 17–21 | (silver) Runner-up |
| 2022 | Polish International | (Chinese Taipei) Lin Xiao-min | (Chinese Taipei) Lu Ming-che (Chinese Taipei) Chung Kan-yu | 21–16, 21–18 | (gold) Winner |
| 2022 | Croatian International | (Chinese Taipei) Lin Xiao-min | (Chinese Taipei) Liao Chao-pang (Chinese Taipei) Liu Chiao-yun | 21–17, 23–21 | (gold) Winner |
| 2022 | Bulgarian International | (Chinese Taipei) Lin Xiao-min | (Chinese Taipei) Liao Chao-pang (Chinese Taipei) Liu Chiao-yun | 21–16, 21–10 | (gold) Winner |
| 2022 | Czech Open | (Chinese Taipei) Lin Xiao-min | (Denmark) Mads Vestergaard (Denmark) Christine Busch | 12–21, 16–21 | (silver) Runner-up |

BWF International Challenge tournament
BWF International Series tournament
BWF Future Series tournament
