= Zhang Shuxian =

Chinese badminton player

Zhang Shuxian 张殊贤
Personal information
- Born: 2 January 2000 (age 26) Luzhou, Sichuan, China
- Years active: 2018 - 2026

Sport
- Country: China
- Sport: Badminton
- Handedness: Right
- Retired: 8 October 2026

Women's doubles
- Highest ranking: 2 (WD with Jia Yifan, 16 June 2026); 2 (WD with Zheng Yu, 23 May 2023); 30 (XD with Guo Xinwa, 27 December 2022)
- BWF profile
Medal record
Women's badminton
Representing China
World Championships
Bronze medal – third place	2023 Copenhagen	Women's doubles
Sudirman Cup
Gold medal – first place	2023 Suzhou	Mixed team
Gold medal – first place	2023 Xiamen	Mixed team
Uber Cup
Gold medal – first place	2024 Chengdu	Women's team
Silver medal – second place	2022 Bangkok	Women's team
Silver medal – second place	2026 Horsens	Women's team
Asian Games
Gold medal – first place	2026 Aichi–Nagoya	Women's team
Silver medal – second place	2022 Hangzhou	Women's team
Asian Championships
Silver medal – second place	2024 Ningbo	Women's doubles
Bronze medal – third place	2025 Ningbo	Women's doubles
Asia Team Championships
Silver medal – second place	2026 Qingdao	Women's team
World Junior Championships
Gold medal – first place	2017 Yogyakarta	Mixed team
Gold medal – first place	2018 Markham	Mixed team
Bronze medal – third place	2017 Yogyakarta	Girls' doubles
Bronze medal – third place	2018 Markham	Mixed doubles
Asian Junior Championships
Gold medal – first place	2018 Jakarta	Mixed team

Zhang Shuxian (pinyin: Zhāng Shūxián; born 2 January 2000) is a Chinese badminton player. She is a prominent Chinese women's doubles specialist who notably securing a bronze medal at the 2023 BWF World Championships and contributing to China's victories at the 2023 and 2025 Sudirman Cup as well at the 2024 Uber Cup. Beyond her success in team events, Zhang has consistently performed at the highest level of the BWF World Tour, reached a career-high world ranking of No. 2 in May 2023 alongside her partner, Zheng Yu.

== Career ==
=== Early career ===
Zhang attended Luzhou Zilu Road School. Later, she was recommended by the city sports school to enter the Sichuan badminton team training, and was transferred to the Sichuan team as an official member in 2016, and was selected for the Chinese national youth team in the same year. In July 2017, Zhang represented China for the first time in the international competition at the 2017 Asian Junior Championships and reached the quarter-finals of the women's doubles. She also participated at the World Junior Championships in 2017 and 2018, winning gold medals in the team event, and also bronze medals in the girls' (2017) and mixed doubles events (2018).

=== 2022 ===
Starting from 2022, Zhang partnered with Zheng Yu and finished as the runners-up at the All England Open, Malaysia Open and Singapore Open, before finally winning the Australian Open. As a result, the pair qualified for the year-end final. They reached the semi-finals before bowing out to compatriots Chen Qingchen and Jia Yifan.

=== 2023 ===
In the first half of the 2023 season, Zhang did not win any title with Zheng Yu. The duo opened the year by reaching the semi-finals of the BWF Super 1000 tournament, the Malaysia Open, but was stunned by Korean pairing Baek Ha-na and Lee Yu-lim. Other semi-finals finished were at the All England and the Singapore Opens. Zhang and Zheng also reached the quarter-finals in the India, Swiss, and Indonesia Opens. During the 2023 Indonesia Masters, Zhang partnered Liu Shengshu, the reigning World Junior Champion in two categories. They eventually won the title. Zhang was also part of the China winning squad in the Sudirman Cup. Their achievement was able to bring them up to 2nd place in the BWF rankings. In August, Zhang and Zheng finished as semi-finalists in the BWF World Championships, losing to their compatriots Chen Qingchen and Jia Yifan. The defeat exacerbated the head-to-head record over Chen and Jia to 0–6. On November 6, in the 2023 Hylo Open Women's Doubles Final, Zhang Shuxian/Zheng Yu 18–21, 1–1 Apriyani Rahayu/ Siti Fadia Silva Ramadhanti(withdrawal) won the 2023 Hylo Open Women's Doubles Championship. On November 19, in the women's doubles final of the 2023 Japan Masters, Zhang Shuxian/Zheng Yu defeated Liu Shengshu/Tan Ning 12–21, 21–12, 21–17 and won the championship.

== Achievements ==
=== World Championships ===
Women's doubles
Year	Venue	Partner	Opponent	Score	Result
2023	Royal Arena, Copenhagen, Denmark	(China) Zheng Yu	(China) Chen Qingchen (China) Jia Yifan	14–21, 16–21	Bronze

=== Asian Championships ===
Women's doubles
Year	Venue	Partner	Opponent	Score	Result
2024	Ningbo Olympic Sports Center Gymnasium, Ningbo, China	(China) Zheng Yu	(South Korea) Baek Ha-na (South Korea) Lee So-hee	21–23, 12–21	Silver
2025	Ningbo Olympic Sports Center Gymnasium, Ningbo, China	(China) Zheng Yu	(China) Liu Shengshu (China) Tan Ning	12–21, 15–21	Bronze

=== World Junior Championships ===
Girls' doubles
Year	Venue	Partner	Opponent	Score	Result
2017	Among Rogo Sports Hall, Yogyakarta, Indonesia	(China) Xia Yuting	(Indonesia) Jauza Fadhila Sugiarto (Indonesia) Ribka Sugiarto	17–21, 21–19, 11–21	Bronze

Mixed doubles
Year	Venue	Partner	Opponent	Score	Result
2018	Markham Pan Am Centre, Markham, Canada	(China) Shang Yichen	(Indonesia) Leo Rolly Carnando (Indonesia) Indah Cahya Sari Jamil	13–21, 23–21, 19–21	Bronze

=== BWF World Tour (13 titles, 14 runners-up) ===
The BWF World Tour, which was announced on 19 March 2017 and implemented in 2018, is a series of elite badminton tournaments sanctioned by the Badminton World Federation (BWF). The BWF World Tour is divided into levels of World Tour Finals, Super 1000, Super 750, Super 500, Super 300 (part of the BWF World Tour), and the BWF Tour Super 100.

Women's doubles
Year	Tournament	Level	Partner	Opponent	Score	Result
2019	Vietnam Open	Super 100	(China) Huang Jia	(Indonesia) Della Destiara Haris (Indonesia) Rizki Amelia Pradipta	18–21, 17–21	(silver) Runner-up
2022	All England Open	Super 1000	(China) Zheng Yu	(Japan) Nami Matsuyama (Japan) Chiharu Shida	13–21, 9–21	(silver) Runner-up
2022	Malaysia Open	Super 750	(China) Zheng Yu	(Indonesia) Apriyani Rahayu (Indonesia) Siti Fadia Silva Ramadhanti	18–21, 21–12, 19–21	(silver) Runner-up
2022	Singapore Open	Super 500	(China) Zheng Yu	(Indonesia) Apriyani Rahayu (Indonesia) Siti Fadia Silva Ramadhanti	14–21, 17–21	(silver) Runner-up
2022	Australian Open	Super 300	(China) Zheng Yu	(Thailand) Benyapa Aimsaard (Thailand) Nuntakarn Aimsaard	21–19, 21–13	(gold) Winner
2023	Indonesia Masters	Super 500	(China) Liu Shengshu	(Japan) Yuki Fukushima (Japan) Sayaka Hirota	22–20, 21–19	(gold) Winner
2023	Hylo Open	Super 300	(China) Zheng Yu	(Indonesia) Apriyani Rahayu (Indonesia) Siti Fadia Silva Ramadhanti	18–21, 1–1^{r}	(gold) Winner
2023	Japan Masters	Super 500	(China) Zheng Yu	(China) Liu Shengshu (China) Tan Ning	12–21, 21–12, 21–17	(gold) Winner
2024	Malaysia Open	Super 1000	(China) Zheng Yu	(China) Liu Shengshu (China) Tan Ning	18–21, 18–21	(silver) Runner-up
2024	India Open	Super 750	(China) Zheng Yu	(Japan) Mayu Matsumoto (Japan) Wakana Nagahara	12–21, 13–21	(silver) Runner-up
2024	Indonesia Masters	Super 500	(China) Zheng Yu	(China) Liu Shengshu (China) Tan Ning	21–10, 19–21, 20–22	(silver) Runner-up
2024	China Open	Super 1000	(China) Li Wenmei	(China) Li Yijing (China) Luo Xumin	21–11, 18–21, 8–21	(silver) Runner-up
2024	Macau Open	Super 300	(China) Li Wenmei	(Chinese Taipei) Hsieh Pei-shan (Chinese Taipei) Hung En-tzu	25–23, 18–21, 22–20	(gold) Winner
2025	Malaysia Open	Super 1000	(China) Jia Yifan	(Japan) Yuki Fukushima (Japan) Mayu Matsumoto	21–17, 15–21, 15–21	(silver) Runner-up
2025	Swiss Open	Super 300	(China) Jia Yifan	(China) Liu Shengshu (China) Tan Ning	21–19, 14–21, 21–17	(gold) Winner
2025	Malaysia Masters	Super 500	(China) Jia Yifan	(China) Liu Shengshu (China) Tan Ning	17–21, 18–21	(silver) Runner-up
2025	China Open	Super 1000	(China) Jia Yifan	(China) Liu Shengshu (China) Tan Ning	22–24, 21–17, 14–21	(silver) Runner-up
2025	Hong Kong Open	Super 500	(China) Jia Yifan	(Japan) Rin Iwanaga (Japan) Kie Nakanishi	21–17, 21–15	(gold) Winner
2025	China Masters	Super 750	(China) Jia Yifan	(South Korea) Kim Hye-jeong (South Korea) Kong Hee-yong	21–19, 16–21, 21–13	(gold) Winner
2026	Swiss Open	Super 300	(China) Jia Yifan	(China) Li Yijing (China) Wang Yiduo	10–21, 20–22	(silver) Runner-up
2026	Singapore Open	Super 750	(China) Jia Yifan	(China) Liu Shengshu (China) Tan Ning	22–20, 21–19	(gold) Winner
2026	Australian Open	Super 500	(China) Jia Yifan	(Indonesia) Febriana Dwipuji Kusuma (Indonesia) Meilysa Trias Puspita Sari	24–22, 21–13	(gold) Winner
2026	Japan Open	Super 750	(China) Jia Yifan	(South Korea) Kim Hye-jeong (South Korea) Kong Hee-yong	21–14, 15–21, 29–30	(silver) Runner-up

Mixed doubles
Year	Tournament	Level	Partner	Opponent	Score	Result
2019	Canada Open	Super 100	(China) Guo Xinwa	(South Korea) Ko Sung-hyun (South Korea) Eom Hye-won	19–21, 19–21	(silver) Runner-up
2019	Vietnam Open	Super 100	(China) Guo Xinwa	(Chinese Taipei) Lee Jhe-huei (Chinese Taipei) Hsu Ya-ching	18–21, 22–20, 21–8	(gold) Winner
2019	Indonesia Masters	Super 100	(China) Guo Xinwa	(Indonesia) Adnan Maulana (Indonesia) Mychelle Crhystine Bandaso	21–18, 16–21, 28–26	(gold) Winner
2019	SaarLorLux Open	Super 100	(China) Guo Xinwa	(China) Ren Xiangyu (China) Zhou Chaomin	21–18, 21–19	(gold) Winner

=== BWF International Challenge/Series (1 title, 2 runners-up) ===
Women's doubles
Year	Tournament	Partner	Opponent	Score	Result
2019	Belarus International	(China) Yu Xiaohan	(England) Jenny Moore (England) Victoria Williams	21–12, 21–15	(gold) Winner

Mixed doubles
Year	Tournament	Partner	Opponent	Score	Result
2019	Osaka International	(China) Guo Xinwa	(South Korea) Jeong Na-eun (South Korea) Kim Won-ho	17–21, 15–21	(silver) Runner-up
2019	Belarus International	(China) Guo Xinwa	(China) Ren Xiangyu (China) Zhou Chaomin	20–22, 19–21	(silver) Runner-up

BWF International Challenge tournament
BWF International Series tournament

=== BWF Junior International (2 titles, 2 runners-up) ===
Women's doubles
Year	Tournament	Partner	Opponent	Score	Result
2017	Korea Junior International	(China) Xia Yuting	(Japan) An Sato (Japan) Shiena Fukumoto	21–11, 21–19	(gold) Winner
2018	German Junior International	(China) Liu Xuanxuan	(South Korea) Jang Eun-seo (South Korea) Lee Jung-hyun	21–14, 24–22	(gold) Winner
2018	Jaya Raya Junior International	(China) Chen Yingying	(China) Liu Xuanxuan (China) Xia Yuting	16–21, 18–21	(silver) Runner-up

Mixed doubles
Year	Tournament	Partner	Opponent	Score	Result
2017	Korea Junior International	(China) Feng Yanzhe	(China) Liu Shiwen (China) Xia Yuting	15–21, 17–21	(silver) Runner-up

BWF Junior International Grand Prix tournament
BWF Junior International Challenge tournament
BWF Junior International Series tournament
BWF Junior Future Series tournament
