= 2017 Badminton Asia Junior Championships – Girls' doubles =

Tournament details
- Dates: 26–30 July 2017
- Edition: 20
- Venue: Jaya Raya Sports Hall Training Center
- Location: Jakarta, Indonesia

The girls' doubles tournament of the 2017 Asian Junior Badminton Championships was held from July 26 to 30. The defending champions of the last edition were Du Yue and Xu Ya from China. The No. 3 seed from South Korea Baek Ha-na and Lee Yu-rim claim the title after defeat the Chinese pair Liu Xuanxuan and Xia Yuting in straight games with the score 21–12, 21–19.

== Seeds ==
1. (South Korea) Kim Min-ji / Seong Ah-yeong (third round)
2. (Indonesia) Agatha Imanuela / Siti Fadia Silva Ramadhanti (semifinals)
3. (South Korea) Baek Ha-na / Lee Yu-rim (champion)
4. (Indonesia) Jauza Fadhila Sugiarto / Ribka Sugiarto (semifinals)
5. (Malaysia) Pearly Tan Koong Le / Toh Ee Wei (quarterfinals)
6. (Thailand) Supisara Paewsampran / Kwanchanok Sudjaipraparat (third round)
7. (Indonesia) Serena Kani / Pitha Haningtyas Mentari (quarterfinals)
8. (Malaysia) Ng Wan Win / Yap Ling (third round)

== Draw ==
=== Finals ===
Quarterfinals
(China) Liu Xuanxuan (China) Xia Yuting	21	21
7	(Indonesia) Serena Kani (Indonesia) Pitha Haningtyas Mentari	13	17
4	(Indonesia) Jauza Fadhila Sugiarto (Indonesia) Ribka Sugiarto	21	21
(China) Yan Chenxue (China) Zhou Meng	12	15
5	(Malaysia) Pearly Tan Koong Le (Malaysia) Toh Ee Wei	14	12
3	(South Korea) Baek Ha-na (South Korea) Lee Yu-rim	21	21
(Chinese Taipei) Chang Yen-ting (Chinese Taipei) Tseng Yu-chi	11	12
2	(Indonesia) Agatha Imanuela (Indonesia) Siti Fadia Silva Ramadhanti	21	21

Semifinals
(China) Liu Xuanxuan (China) Xia Yuting	21	21
4	(Indonesia) Jauza Fadhila Sugiarto (Indonesia) Ribka Sugiarto	16	17
3	(South Korea) Baek Ha-na (South Korea) Lee Yu-rim	21	21
2	(Indonesia) Agatha Imanuela (Indonesia) Siti Fadia Silva Ramadhanti	18	12

Final
(China) Liu Xuanxuan (China) Xia Yuting	12	19
3	(South Korea) Baek Ha-na (South Korea) Lee Yu-rim	21	21

=== Top half ===
==== Section 1 ====
First round	Second round				Third round
	1	(South Korea) Kim M-j (South Korea) Seong A-y	21	21
		(Malaysia) Eng S J (Malaysia) Tan S J	18	12
					1	(South Korea) Kim M-j (South Korea) Seong A-y	14	18
						(China) Liu XX (China) Xia YT	21	21
		(Philippines) A M N Albo (Philippines) A Geverjuan	11	13
		(China) Liu XX (China) Xia YT	21	21

==== Section 2 ====
First round
(Thailand) B Aimsaard (Thailand) N Aimsaard	21	21
(Sri Lanka) N Teshani (Sri Lanka) H C Wijayarathne	11	5

Second round
7	(Indonesia) S Kani (Indonesia) P H Mentari	21	21
(Vietnam) Pham N B (Vietnam) Tran T P T	6	7
(India) R Farhath (India) A Vijayakumar	9	7
(Thailand) B Aimsaard (Thailand) N Aimsaard	21	21

Third round
7	(Indonesia) S Kani (Indonesia) P H Mentari	21	21
(Thailand) B Aimsaard (Thailand) N Aimsaard	16	19

==== Section 3 ====
First round
(Thailand) S Chueboca (Thailand) T Thamnopakao	21	21
(India) A B Kangila (India) A Nayak	18	10

Second round
4	(Indonesia) J F Sugiarto (Indonesia) R Sugiarto	21	21
(Hong Kong) Wong C C (Hong Kong) Yeung S Y	7	8
(Macau) Wong C W (Macau) Zou Z L	7	10
(Thailand) S Chueboca (Thailand) T Thamnopakao	21	21

Third round
4	(Indonesia) J F Sugiarto (Indonesia) R Sugiarto	21	21
(Thailand) S Chueboca (Thailand) T Thamnopakao	17	16

==== Section 4 ====
First round
(South Korea) Park G-e (South Korea) Sim Y-j	12	23
(China) Yan CX (China) Zhou M	21	25

Second round
8	(Malaysia) Ng W W (Malaysia) Yap L	21	17	21
(Chinese Taipei) Chang Y-h (Chinese Taipei) Lo P-t	17	21	19
(Sri Lanka) H N Ambalangodae (Sri Lanka) G A Mahesha	7	8
(China) Yan CX (China) Zhou M	21	21

Third round
8	(Malaysia) Ng W W (Malaysia) Yap L	19	16
(China) Yan CX (China) Zhou M	21	21

=== Bottom half ===
==== Section 5 ====
First round
(Singapore) N I Khan (Singapore) J R Sito	14	12
(China) Qiao SJ (China) Zhang SX	21	21

Second round
(China) Qiao SJ (China) Zhang SX	21	12	21
(Indonesia) F V D Gani (Indonesia) L A Kusumawati	9	21	14
(Hong Kong) Leung Y Y (Hong Kong) Yeung P L	11	17
5	(Malaysia) P Tan (Malaysia) Toh E W	21	21

Third round
(China) Qiao SJ (China) Zhang SX	12	21	20
5	(Malaysia) P Tan (Malaysia) Toh E W	21	15	22

==== Section 6 ====
First round
(Indonesia) M I Cindiani (Indonesia) F D Kusuma	11	13
(Chinese Taipei) Li Z-q (Chinese Taipei) Teng C-h	21	21

Second round
(Chinese Taipei) Li Z-q (Chinese Taipei) Teng C-h	21	21
(Kazakhstan) I Gordeyeva (Kazakhstan) A Zhumabek	6	5
(Sri Lanka) D Dias (Sri Lanka) L Hettiarachchi	5	9
3	(South Korea) Baek H-n (South Korea) Lee Y-r	21	21

Third round
(Chinese Taipei) Li Z-q (Chinese Taipei) Teng C-h	10	19
3	(South Korea) Baek H-n (South Korea) Lee Y-r	21	21

==== Section 7 ====
First round
(Myanmar) Phyo L L (Myanmar) Oo T T	21	21
(Mongolia) G Baatarsuren (Mongolia) K Darkhanbaatar	12	17

Second round
(Myanmar) Phyo L L (Myanmar) Oo T T	4	10
(Chinese Taipei) Chang Y-t (Chinese Taipei) Tseng Y-c	21	21
(Macau) Ao I K (Macau) Gong X X	18	12
6	(Thailand) S Paewsampran (Thailand) K Sudjaipraparat	21	21

Third round
(Chinese Taipei) Chang Y-t (Chinese Taipei) Tseng Y-c	21	11	21
6	(Thailand) S Paewsampran (Thailand) K Sudjaipraparat	17	21	19

==== Section 8 ====
First round
(Hong Kong) Leung S L (Hong Kong) Wong H C	21	21
(Nepal) J Gurung (Nepal) R Maharjan	5	10

Second round
(Hong Kong) Leung S L (Hong Kong) Wong H C	21	21
(Uzbekistan) S Shavkatova (Uzbekistan) S Sodikova	7	8
(India) R Panda (India) M Umakant	16	21	14
2	(Indonesia) A Imanuela (Indonesia) S F S Ramadhanti	21	16	21

Third round
(Hong Kong) Leung S L (Hong Kong) Wong H C	10	3
2	(Indonesia) A Imanuela (Indonesia) S F S Ramadhanti	21	21
