= 2018 Badminton Asia Junior Championships – Girls' doubles =

Tournament details
- Dates: 18–22 July 2017
- Edition: 21
- Venue: Jaya Raya Sports Hall Training Center
- Location: Jakarta, Indonesia

The girls' doubles tournament of the 2018 Badminton Asia Junior Championships was held from July 18 to 22. The defending champion of the last edition were Baek Ha-na and Lee Yu-rim from South Korea. The top seeds in this event this year are the returning silver medallists Liu Xuanxuan / Xia Yuting from China, Agatha Imanuela / Siti Fadia Silva Ramadhanti of Indonesia seeded in the second place.

== Seeded ==
1. (China) Liu Xuanxuan / Xia Yuting (semifinals)
2. (Indonesia) Agatha Imanuela / Siti Fadia Silva Ramadhanti (semifinals)
3. (Malaysia) Pearly Tan Koong Le / Toh Ee Wei (final)
4. (Indonesia) Febriana Dwipuji Kusuma / Ribka Sugiarto (champions)
5. (Chinese Taipei) Li Zi-qing / Teng Chun-hsun (third round)
6. (China) Chen Yingying / Zhang Shuxian (third round)
7. (Indonesia) Metya Inayah Cindiani / Febby Valencia Dwijayanti Gani (quarterfinals)
8. (Indonesia) Indah Cahya Sari Jamil / Lisa Ayu Kusumawati (quarterfinals)

== Draw ==
=== Finals ===
Quarterfinals
1 | (China) Liu Xuanxuan (China) Xia Yuting | 21 | 22
8 | (Indonesia) Indah Cahya Sari Jamil (Indonesia) Lisa Ayu Kusumawati | 19 | 20
4 | (Indonesia) Febriana Dwipuji Kusuma (Indonesia) Ribka Sugiarto | 21 | 21
(China) Guo Lizhi (China) Li Yijing | 13 | 15
7 | (Indonesia) Metya Inayah Cindiani (Indonesia) Febby Valencia Dwijayanti Gani | 6 | 18
3 | (Malaysia) Pearly Tan Koong Le (Malaysia) Toh Ee Wei | 21 | 21
(South Korea) Jang Eun-seo (South Korea) Lee Jung-hyun | 19 | 17
2 | (Indonesia) Agatha Imanuela (Indonesia) Siti Fadia Silva Ramadhanti | 21 | 21

Semifinals
1 | (China) Liu Xuanxuan (China) Xia Yuting | 23 | 21 | 15
4 | (Indonesia) Febriana Dwipuji Kusuma (Indonesia) Ribka Sugiarto | 25 | 14 | 21
3 | (Malaysia) Pearly Tan Koong Le (Malaysia) Toh Ee Wei | 21 | 23
2 | (Indonesia) Agatha Imanuela (Indonesia) Siti Fadia Silva Ramadhanti | 15 | 21

Final
4 | (Indonesia) Febriana Dwipuji Kusuma (Indonesia) Ribka Sugiarto | 21 | 21
3 | (Malaysia) Pearly Tan Koong Le (Malaysia) Toh Ee Wei | 12 | 16

=== Top half ===
==== Section 1 ====
First round
(South Korea) Chung D-j (South Korea) Kim S-j | 21 | 14
(Japan) S Fukumoto (Japan) A Uesugi | 23 | 21

Second round
1 | (China) Liu XX (China) Xia YT | 21 | 21
(India) S Singhi (India) R Thaker | 15 | 16
(Myanmar) Seng J N (Myanmar) Zar K T | 6 | 5
(Hong Kong) Leung Y Y (Hong Kong) S S Mehta | 21 | 21
8 | (Indonesia) I C S Jamil (Indonesia) L A Kusumawati | 21 | 21
(Singapore) I Khan (Singapore) B Lim | 13 | 15
(Sri Lanka) J Amanda (Sri Lanka) A Samaranayke | 4 | 8
(Japan) S Fukumoto (Japan) A Uesugi | 21 | 21

Third round
1 | (China) Liu XX (China) Xia YT | 21 | 21
(Hong Kong) Leung Y Y (Hong Kong) S S Mehta | 12 | 10
8 | (Indonesia) I C S Jamil (Indonesia) L A Kusumawati | 13 | 21 | 21
(Japan) S Fukumoto (Japan) A Uesugi | 21 | 18 | 15

Quarterfinal
1 | (China) Liu XX (China) Xia YT | 21 | 22
8 | (Indonesia) I C S Jamil (Indonesia) L A Kusumawati | 19 | 20

==== Section 2 ====
First round
(China) Guo LZ (China) Li YJ | 21 | 21
(India) N S Siraj (India) M Shashidharan | 9 | 18

Second round
4 | (Indonesia) F D Kusuma (Indonesia) R Sugiarto | 21 | 21
(Thailand) P Choeikeewong (Thailand) P Suwatnodom | 14 | 5
(Malaysia) Eng S J (Malaysia) Yap L | 17 | 21 | 10
(South Korea) Jeong N-e (South Korea) Lee E-j | 21 | 16 | 21
5 | (Chinese Taipei) Li Z-q (Chinese Taipei) Teng C-h | 21 | 21
(Japan) K Osawa (Japan) H Suzuki | 17 | 16
(Mongolia) O Amartaivan (Mongolia) K Darkhanbaatar
(China) Guo LZ (China) Li YJ | w | / | o

Third round
4 | (Indonesia) F D Kusuma (Indonesia) R Sugiarto | 21 | 21
(South Korea) Jeong N-e (South Korea) Lee E-j | 17 | 12
5 | (Chinese Taipei) Li Z-q (Chinese Taipei) Teng C-h | 15 | 12
(China) Guo LZ (China) Li YJ | 21 | 21

Quarterfinal
4 | (Indonesia) F D Kusuma (Indonesia) R Sugiarto | 21 | 21
(China) Guo LZ (China) Li YJ | 13 | 15

=== Bottom half ===
==== Section 3 ====
First round
(Singapore) S Loo (Singapore) F Low | 21 | 18 | 5
(Sri Lanka) D Dias (Sri Lanka) A Masakorala | 16 | 21 | 21
(Kazakhstan) I Gordeyeva (Kazakhstan) A Zhumabek | 10 | 6
(Hong Kong) Leung S L (Hong Kong) Yeung P L | 21 | 21

Second round
(Sri Lanka) D Dias (Sri Lanka) A Masakorala | 21 | 21
(Macau) Chio W U (Macau) Wong C W | 14 | 11
(Chinese Taipei) Jiang Y-h (Chinese Taipei) Sun W-p | 16 | 24
7 | (Indonesia) M I Cindiani (Indonesia) F V D Gani | 21 | 26
(Hong Kong) Leung S L (Hong Kong) Yeung P L | 21 | 21
(India) S Jupudi (India) P Konadam | 18 | 12
(Thailand) S Chueboca (Thailand) S Silprakob | 14 | 14
3 | (Malaysia) P Tan (Malaysia) Toh E W | 21 | 21

Third round
(Sri Lanka) D Dias (Sri Lanka) A Masakorala | 13 | 10
7 | (Indonesia) M I Cindiani (Indonesia) F V D Gani | 21 | 21
(Hong Kong) Leung S L (Hong Kong) Yeung P L | 10 | 21 | 15
3 | (Malaysia) P Tan (Malaysia) Toh E W | 21 | 17 | 21

Quarterfinal
7 | (Indonesia) M I Cindiani (Indonesia) F V D Gani | 6 | 18
3 | (Malaysia) P Tan (Malaysia) Toh E W | 21 | 21

==== Section 4 ====
First round
(Japan) N Saito (Japan) R Yoshida | 21 | 21 | 21
(Thailand) B Aimsaard (Thailand) P Khantaruangsakul | 23 | 15 | 16

Second round
(Japan) N Saito (Japan) R Yoshida | 19 | 5
(South Korea) Jang E-s (South Korea) Lee J-h | 21 | 21
(Indonesia) N V Marwah (Indonesia) P Syaikah | 10 | 22 | 19
6 | (China) Chen YY (China) Zhang SX | 21 | 20 | 21
(Malaysia) Go P K (Malaysia) Teoh L X | 14 | 13
(Chinese Taipei) Cheng Y-p (Chinese Taipei) Hung E-t | 21 | 21
(Hong Kong) Lui L L (Hong Kong) Tsang H Y | 11 | 17
2 | (Indonesia) A Imanuela (Indonesia) S F S Ramadhanti | 21 | 21

Third round
(South Korea) Jang E-s (South Korea) Lee J-h | 21 | 12 | 21
6 | (China) Chen YY (China) Zhang SX | 14 | 21 | 18
(Chinese Taipei) Cheng Y-p (Chinese Taipei) Hung E-t | 14 | 17
2 | (Indonesia) A Imanuela (Indonesia) S F S Ramadhanti | 21 | 21

Quarterfinal
(South Korea) Jang E-s (South Korea) Lee J-h | 19 | 17
2 | (Indonesia) A Imanuela (Indonesia) S F S Ramadhanti | 21 | 21
