= Lisa Ayu Kusumawati =

Indonesian badminton player (born 2000)

Personal information
- Born: 15 January 2000 (age 26) Sleman, Yogyakarta, Indonesia

Sport
- Country: Indonesia
- Sport: Badminton
- Handedness: Right

Women's & mixed doubles
- Highest ranking: 167 (WD with Febby Valencia Dwijayanti Gani 3 May 2018); 10 (XD with Rehan Naufal Kusharjanto 2 May 2023)
- Current ranking: 23 (XD with Rehan Naufal Kusharjanto); 106 (XD with Rinov Rivaldy) (11 March 2025)
- BWF profile
Medal record
Women's badminton
Representing Indonesia
Asia Mixed Team Championships
Gold medal – first place	2025 Qingdao	Mixed team
SEA Games
Gold medal – first place	2023 Cambodia	Mixed doubles
Silver medal – second place	2023 Cambodia	Women's team
World Junior Championships
Bronze medal – third place	2018 Markham	Mixed team
Asian Junior Championships
Bronze medal – third place	2018 Jakarta	Mixed team

Lisa Ayu Kusumawati (born 15 January 2000) is an Indonesian badminton player affiliated with Djarum club.

== Career ==
Kusumawati was born in Sleman, Yogyakarta, and joining Djarum club in 2012. She has won four U17 National circuit titles. She won her first international title at the 2019 Finnish Open in the mixed doubles event partnered with Rehan Naufal Kusharjanto.

=== 2022 ===
In March, Kusumawati and Rehan Naufal Kusharjanto reached their first BWF Tour final in the Orléans Masters but lost to Singaporean pair of Terry Hee and Tan Wei Han. In October, they reached another final in the Vietnam Open but lost to fellow Indonesian pair of Dejan Ferdinansyah and Gloria Emanuelle Widjaja. In November, they claimed their first ever BWF World Tour title in the Hylo Open by defeating Feng Yanzhe and Huang Dongping in the final in straight games.

=== 2023 ===
Kusumawati and Kusharjanto opened the 2023 season at the Malaysia Open, but defeated in the second round to Malaysian pair Chen Tang Jie and Toh Ee Wei. In the next tournament, they lost again in second round of the India Open from top seed Zheng Siwei and Huang Yaqiong. They competed at the home tournament, Indonesia Masters, but had to lose in the first round from Japanese pair Kyohei Yamashita and Naru Shinoya. For the fourth consecutive time, they lost early in the second round of the Thailand Masters, this time from Korean pair Kim Won-ho and Jeong Na-eun.

In February, Kusumawati join the Indonesia national badminton team to compete at the Badminton Asia Mixed Team Championships, but unfortunately the teams lost in the quarter-finals from team Korea.

In March, Kusumawati and Kusharjanto competed in the European tour. They able to reached the All England Open semi-finals, but must admit the toughness of the world number 1 mixed doubles pair Zheng Siwei and Huang Yaqiong in a close rubber games. In the next tour, they lost in the second round of Swiss Open, and bounced back by reaching the quarter-finals of the Spain Masters, and then the semi-finals of the Orléans Masters.

In late April, Kusumati with her partner, Kursharjanto, then competed at the Asian Championships in Dubai, United Arab Emirates, but had to retire in the first round from Chinese Taipei pair Chang Ko-chi and Lee Chih-chen.

In May, Kusumati made his debut at the 2023 Cambodia SEA Games in May, and emerged victorious in the mixed doubles with Kusharjanto. Her names also included in the Indonesia squad that won the silver medal in the women's team. In late May, they competed in the second Asian Tour at the Malaysia Masters. Unfortunately, they lost in the second round from Thai pair Supak Jomkoh and Supissara Paewsampran in straight games.

In June, Kusumawati and Kusharjanto competed at the Singapore Open, but lost in the first round from 7th seed Malaysian pair Goh Soon Huat and Shevon Jemie Lai. In the next tour, they competed at the home tournament, Indonesia Open, but lost in the second round from Danish pair Mathias Thyrri and Amalie Magelund. In the next tour, they also lost in the second round at the Taipei Open from 331st ranked host pair Tseng Min-hao and Hsieh Pei-shan.

In late July, Kusumawati and Kusharjanto competed at the 2023 Japan Open, but lost in the first round against Hong Kong pair Tang Chun Man and Tse Ying Suet.

In August, Kusumawati and Kusharjanto competed at the Australian Open, but had to lose in the first round from Hong Kong pair Tang Chun Man and Tse Ying Suet for second consecutive match. She and her partner then played at the World Championships, but lost in the third round from 2nd seed Japanese pair Yuta Watanabe and Arisa Higashino in straight games. Kusumawati made her debut at the Asian Games in Hangzhou, but failed to bring home any medals after lost in the opening round of the mixed doubles, while the Indonesia team was eliminated in the quarter-finals.

== Achievements ==
=== SEA Games ===
Mixed doubles
Year	Venue	Partner	Opponent	Score	Result	Ref.
2023	Morodok Techo Badminton Hall; Phnom Penh, Cambodia	(Indonesia) Rehan Naufal Kusharjanto	(Malaysia) Yap Roy King (Malaysia) Cheng Su Yin	20–22, 21–8, 21–16	Gold	

=== BWF World Tour (1 title, 3 runners-up) ===
The BWF World Tour, which was announced on 19 March 2017 and implemented in 2018, is a series of elite badminton tournaments sanctioned by the Badminton World Federation (BWF). The BWF World Tours are divided into levels of World Tour Finals, Super 1000, Super 750, Super 500, Super 300, and the BWF Tour Super 100.

Mixed doubles
Year	Tournament	Level	Partner	Opponent	Score	Result	Ref.
2022	Orléans Masters	Super 100	(Indonesia) Rehan Naufal Kusharjanto	(Singapore) Terry Hee (Singapore) Tan Wei Han	12–21, 21–16, 13–21	(silver) Runner-up	
2022	Vietnam Open	Super 100	(Indonesia) Rehan Naufal Kusharjanto	(Indonesia) Dejan Ferdinansyah (Indonesia) Gloria Emanuelle Widjaja	13–21, 18–21	(silver) Runner-up	
2022	Hylo Open	Super 300	(Indonesia) Rehan Naufal Kusharjanto	(China) Feng Yanzhe (China) Huang Dongping	21–17, 21–15	(gold) Winner	
2023	Hylo Open	Super 300	(Indonesia) Rehan Naufal Kusharjanto	(Hong Kong) Tang Chun Man (Hong Kong) Tse Ying Suet	21–15, 15–21, 14–21	(silver) Runner-up	

=== BWF International Challenge/Series (1 title) ===
Mixed doubles
Year	Tournament	Partner	Opponent	Score	Result	Ref.
2019	Finnish Open	(Indonesia) Rehan Naufal Kusharjanto	(Denmark) Mathias Bay-Smidt (Denmark) Rikke Søby Hansen	22–20, 15–21, 21–14	(gold) Winner	

BWF International Challenge tournament
BWF International Series tournament

=== BWF Junior International (1 title) ===
Mixed doubles
Year	Tournament	Partner	Opponent	Score	Result	Ref.
2018	Malaysia Junior International	(Indonesia) Ghifari Anandaffa Prihardika	(Indonesia) Rehan Naufal Kusharjanto (Indonesia) Siti Fadia Silva Ramadhanti	21–19, 14–21, 21–16	(gold) Winner	

BWF Junior International Grand Prix tournament
BWF Junior International Challenge tournament
BWF Junior International Series tournament
BWF Junior Future Series tournament

== Performance timeline ==
Key

W	Won	F	Finalist	SF	Semi-finalist
QF	Quarter-finalist	#R	Rounds 4, 3, 2, 1	RR	Round-robin stage
Q#	Qualification round	A	Absent	w/d	Withdrew
G	Gold	S	Silver	B	Bronze
NH	Not held	N/A	Not applicable	DNQ	Did not qualify

=== National team ===
- Junior level

Team events	2018
Asian Junior Championships	B

- Senior level

Team events	2022	2023	2024	2025	Ref
SEA Games	NH	S	NH		
Asia Mixed Team Championships	NH	QF	NH	G	
Asian Games	QF	NH			

=== Individual competitions ===
==== Junior level ====
- Girls' doubles

Events	2017	2018
Asian Junior Championships	2R	QF

- Mixed doubles

Events	2017	2018
Asian Junior Championships	2R	2R
World Junior Championships	A	QF

==== Senior level ====
===== Women's doubles =====
Tournament	BWF Superseries / Grand Prix		BWF World Tour	Best
Tournament	2016	2017	2018	Best
Indonesia Masters Super 100	N/A		1R	1R ('18)
Indonesia Masters	A	NH	1R	1R ('18)
Indonesia Open	w/d	Q1	A	Q1 ('17)
Year-end ranking		323	316	167
Tournament	2016	2017	2018	Best

===== Mixed doubles =====
Events	2021	2022	2023	2024	Ref
SEA Games	A	NH	G	NH	
Asian Championships	NH	1R	1R	1R	
Asian Games	NH	1R	NH		
World Championships	w/d	3R	3R	NH	

Tournament	BWF World Tour								Best	Ref
Tournament	2018	2019	2020	2021	2022	2023	2024	2025	Best	Ref
Malaysia Open	A		NH		2R	2R	2R	A	2R ('22, '23, '24)	
India Open	A		NH		A	2R	2R	1R	2R ('23, '24)	
Indonesia Masters	A			1R	2R	1R	QF	SF	SF ('25)	
Thailand Masters	A			NH		2R	SF	1R	SF ('24)	
German Open	A		NH		A		SF	A	SF ('24)	
Orléans Masters	A	SF	NH	A	F	SF	A		F ('22)	
All England Open	A					SF	1R	A	SF ('23)	
Swiss Open	A		NH	A	SF	2R	2R	A	SF ('22)	
Spain Masters	A				NH	QF	QF	NH	QF ('23, '24)	
Taipei Open	A		NH		w/d	2R	A	1R	2R ('23)	
Thailand Open	A			NH	1R	A	QF	1R	QF ('24)	
Malaysia Masters	A			NH	1R	2R	QF	2R	QF ('24)	
Singapore Open	A		NH		1R	1R	A		1R ('22, '23)	
Indonesia Open	A		NH	1R	1R	2R	1R	A	2R ('23)	
Japan Open	A		NH		1R	1R	2R	A	2R ('24)	
China Open	A		NH			1R	A		1R ('23)	
Vietnam Open	A	1R	NH		F	A		1R	F ('22)	
Hong Kong Open	A		NH			2R	A		2R ('23)	
China Masters	A		NH			1R	A		2R ('23)	
Indonesia Masters Super 100	2R	SF	NH		A	A		1R	SF ('19)	
Indonesia Masters Super 100	2R	SF	NH		A	A			SF ('19)	
Korea Open	A		NH		A		2R	A	2R ('24)	
Arctic Open	N/A		NH			A	QF	A	QF ('24)	
Denmark Open	A				1R	1R	2R	A	2R ('24)	
French Open	A		NH	A	SF	QF	1R	A	SF ('22)	
Hylo Open	A				W	F	A		W ('22)	
Japan Masters	NH					1R	2R	A	2R ('24)	
Australian Open	A		NH		A	1R	1R	A	1R ('23, '24)	
Hyderabad Open	A	QF	NH						QF ('19)	
Russian Open	A	QF	NH						QF ('19)	
Year-end ranking	463	55	48	54	14	19	22	102	10	
Tournament	2018	2019	2020	2021	2022	2023	2024	2025	Best	Ref
