= Badminton at the 2021 SEA Games – Women's team =

Badminton – Women's team at the 2021 SEA Games
- Venue: Bac Giang Gymnasium
- Dates: 16–18 May 2022
- Nations: 6

Medalists
gold medal	Thailand (THA)
silver medal	Indonesia (INA)
bronze medal	Singapore (SGP)
bronze medal	Vietnam (VIE)

The badminton women's team tournament at the 2021 SEA Games was held from 16 to 18 May 2022 at the Bac Giang Gymnasium, Bắc Giang, Vietnam.

== Schedule ==
All times are Vietnam Standard Time (UTC+07:00)

Date	Time	Event
Monday, 16 May	09:00	Quarter-final
Tuesday, 17 May	09:00	Semi-final
Wednesday, 18 May	13:00	Gold medal match

== Bracket ==
Quarter-finals
3/4	Singapore (SGP)	3
Philippines (PHI)	0
Vietnam (VIE)	3
3/4	Malaysia (MAS)	1

Semi-finals
1	Thailand (THA)	3
3/4	Singapore (SGP)	0
Vietnam (VIE)	1
2	Indonesia (INA)	3

Final
1	Thailand (THA)	3
2	Indonesia (INA)	0

== Quarter-finals ==
=== Singapore vs Philippines ===
Singapore
3
Bac Giang Gymnasium Court 2
16 May 2022 09:00 UTC+7

Philippines
0

			1	2	3
1	(Singapore) (Philippines)	Yeo Jia Min; Janelle Andres	21; 12	21; 8
2	(Singapore) (Philippines)	Jin Yujia / Crystal Wong; Nicole Albo / Thea Pomar	21; 14	21; 19
3	(Singapore) (Philippines)	Jaslyn Hooi; Mikaela de Guzman	21; 17	21; 17
4	(Singapore) (Philippines)	Grace Chua / Bernice Lim; Eleanor Inlayo / Susmita Ramos				not played
5	(Singapore) (Philippines)	Insyirah Khan; Sarah Barredo				not played

=== Vietnam vs Malaysia ===
Vietnam
3
Bac Giang Gymnasium Court 1
16 May 2022 09:00 UTC+7

Malaysia
1

			1	2	3
1	(Vietnam) (Malaysia)	Nguyễn Thùy Linh; Siti Nurshuhaini	21; 9	21; 8
2	(Vietnam) (Malaysia)	Vũ Thị Trang; Siti Zulaikha	21; 9	21; 7
3	(Vietnam) (Malaysia)	Đinh Thị Phương Hồng / Đỗ Thị Hoài; Go Pei Kee / Yap Ling	21; 12	15; 21	16; 21
4	(Vietnam) (Malaysia)	Vũ Thị Anh Thư; Ong Xin Yee	21; 13	21; 15
5	(Vietnam) (Malaysia)	Nguyễn Thùy Linh / Vũ Thị Trang; Cheah Yee See / Cheng Su Hui				not played

== Semi-finals ==
=== Thailand vs Singapore ===
Thailand
3
Bac Giang Gymnasium Court 2
17 May 2022 09:00 UTC+7

Singapore
0

			1	2	3
1	(Thailand) (Singapore)	Pornpawee Chochuwong; Yeo Jia Min	21; 17	21; 13
2	(Thailand) (Singapore)	Jongkolphan Kititharakul / Rawinda Prajongjai; Jin Yujia / Crystal Wong	21; 19	21; 15
3	(Thailand) (Singapore)	Phittayaporn Chaiwan; Insyirah Khan	21; 15	23; 21
4	(Thailand) (Singapore)	Benyapa Aimsaard / Nuntakarn Aimsaard; Grace Chua / Bernice Lim				not played
5	(Thailand) (Singapore)	Supanida Katethong; Megan Lee				not played

=== Vietnam vs Indonesia ===
Vietnam
1
Bac Giang Gymnasium Court 1
17 May 2022 09:00 UTC+7

Indonesia
3

			1	2	3
1	(Vietnam) (Indonesia)	Nguyễn Thùy Linh; Gregoria Mariska Tunjung	14; 21	21; 17	21; 16
2	(Vietnam) (Indonesia)	Phạm Thị Khánh / Thân Vân Anh; Apriyani Rahayu / Siti Fadia Silva Ramadhanti	3; 21	9; 21
3	(Vietnam) (Indonesia)	Vũ Thị Trang; Putri Kusuma Wardani	19; 21	21; 16	15; 21
4	(Vietnam) (Indonesia)	Đỗ Thị Hoài / Phạm Như Thảo; Febby Valencia Dwijayanti Gani / Ribka Sugiarto	13; 21	14; 21
5	(Vietnam) (Indonesia)	Vũ Thị Anh Thư; Stephanie Widjaja				not played

== Finals ==
=== Thailand vs Indonesia ===
Thailand
3
Bac Giang Gymnasium Court 1
18 May 2022 13:00 UTC+7

Indonesia
0

			1	2	3
1	(Thailand) (Indonesia)	Pornpawee Chochuwong; Putri Kusuma Wardani	21; 16	22; 20
2	(Thailand) (Indonesia)	Jongkolphan Kititharakul / Rawinda Prajongjai; Apriyani Rahayu / Siti Fadia Silva Ramadhanti	21; 16	21; 12
3	(Thailand) (Indonesia)	Supanida Katethong; Stephanie Widjaja	21; 14	21; 8
4	(Thailand) (Indonesia)	Benyapa Aimsaard / Nuntakarn Aimsaard; Febby Valencia Dwijayanti Gani / Ribka Sugiarto				not played
5	(Thailand) (Indonesia)	Pitchamon Opatniputh; Saifi Rizka Nurhidayah				not played

== See also ==
- Individual event
- Men's team tournament
