= Liu Xuanxuan =

Chinese badminton player (born 2000)

Liu Xuanxuan 刘玄炫
Personal information
- Born: 18 June 2000 (age 26) Hunan, China
- Years active: 2016–present
- Height: 1.68 m (5 ft 6 in)

Sport
- Country: China
- Sport: Badminton
- Handedness: Right
- Coached by: Zhao Yunlei

Women's & mixed doubles
- Highest ranking: 14 (WD with Li Wenmei 25 July 2023); 70 (XD 28 June 2018)
- Current ranking: 16 (WD with Li Wenmei 16 January 2024)
- BWF profile
Medal record
Women's badminton
Representing China
Uber Cup
Gold medal – first place	2020 Aarhus	Women's team
World University Games
Gold medal – first place	2021 Chengdu	Women's doubles
Silver medal – second place	2021 Chengdu	Mixed team
World Junior Championships
Gold medal – first place	2017 Yogyakarta	Mixed team
Gold medal – first place	2018 Markham	Girls' doubles
Gold medal – first place	2018 Markham	Mixed team
Bronze medal – third place	2017 Yogyakarta	Girls' doubles
Bronze medal – third place	2017 Yogyakarta	Mixed doubles
Asian Junior Championships
Gold medal – first place	2018 Jakarta	Mixed team
Gold medal – first place	2018 Jakarta	Mixed doubles
Silver medal – second place	2017 Jakarta	Girls' doubles
Bronze medal – third place	2018 Jakarta	Girls' doubles

Liu Xuanxuan (Chinese: 刘玄炫; pinyin: Liú Xuánxuàn; born 18 June 2000) is a Chinese badminton player from Hunan. She was part of the national junior team that won the mixed team title at the 2017 and 2018 World Junior Championships and also at the 2018 Asian Junior Championships. In the individual junior event, she was the girls' doubles champion at the 2018 World Junior Championships partnered with Xia Yuting. Liu won her first senior international title at the 2018 Lingshui China Masters in the mixed doubles event partnered with Guo Xinwa.

== Achievements ==
=== World University Games ===
Women's doubles
Year	Venue	Partner	Opponent	Score	Result	Ref.
2021	Shuangliu Sports Centre Gymnasium; Chengdu, China	(China) Li Wenmei	(China) Du Yue (China) Xia Yuting	18–21, 21–19, 21–14	Gold	

=== World Junior Championships ===
Girls' doubles
Year	Venue	Partner	Opponent	Score	Result
2017	Among Rogo Sports Hall; Yogyakarta, Indonesia	(China) Li Wenmei	(South Korea) Baek Ha-na (South Korea) Lee Yu-rim	21–17, 18–21, 13–21	Bronze
2018	Markham Pan Am Centre; Markham, Canada	(China) Xia Yuting	(Malaysia) Pearly Tan (Malaysia) Toh Ee Wei	21–16, 21–16	Gold

Mixed doubles
Year	Venue	Partner	Opponent	Score	Result
2017	Among Rogo Sports Hall; Yogyakarta, Indonesia	(China) Fan Qiuyue	(Indonesia) Rehan Naufal Kusharjanto (Indonesia) Siti Fadia Silva Ramadhanti	15–21, 14–21	Bronze

=== Asian Junior Championships ===
Girls' doubles
Year	Venue	Partner	Opponent	Score	Result
2017	Jaya Raya Sports Hall Training Center; Jakarta, Indonesia	(China) Xia Yuting	(South Korea) Baek Ha-na (South Korea) Lee Yu-rim	12–21, 19–21	Silver
2018	Jaya Raya Sports Hall Training Center; Jakarta, Indonesia	(China) Xia Yuting	(Indonesia) Febriana Dwipuji Kusuma (Indonesia) Ribka Sugiarto	23–25, 21–14, 15–21	Bronze

Mixed doubles
Year	Venue	Partner	Opponent	Score	Result
2018	Jaya Raya Sports Hall Training Center; Jakarta, Indonesia	(China) Guo Xinwa	(South Korea) Wang Chan (South Korea) Jeong Na-eun	15–21, 21–19, 21–15	Gold

=== BWF World Tour (2 titles, 2 runners-up) ===
The BWF World Tour, which was announced on 19 March 2017 and implemented in 2018, is a series of elite badminton tournaments sanctioned by the Badminton World Federation (BWF). The BWF World Tour is divided into levels of World Tour Finals, Super 1000, Super 750, Super 500, Super 300 (part of the HSBC World Tour), and the BWF Tour Super 100.

Women's doubles
Year	Tournament	Level	Partner	Opponent	Score	Result
2019	Lingshui China Masters	Super 100	(China) Xia Yuting	(South Korea) Baek Ha-na (South Korea) Kim Hye-rin	14–21, 21–14, 15–21	(silver) Runner-up
2019	SaarLorLux Open	Super 100	(China) Xia Yuting	(England) Chloe Birch (England) Lauren Smith	21–16, 21–13	(gold) Winner

Mixed doubles
Year	Tournament	Level	Partner	Opponent	Score	Result
2018	Lingshui China Masters	Super 100	(China) Guo Xinwa	(Indonesia) Ronald Alexander (Indonesia) Annisa Saufika	21–17, 7–21, 21–19	(gold) Winner
2019	Lingshui China Masters	Super 100	(China) Guo Xinwa	(Hong Kong) Tang Chun Man (Hong Kong) Ng Tsz Yau	21–16, 14–21, 13–21	(silver) Runner-up

=== BWF International Challenge/Series (1 title) ===
Women's doubles
Year	Tournament	Partner	Opponent	Score	Result
2019	Austrian Open	(China) Xia Yuting	(Russia) Anastasiia Akchurina (Russia) Olga Morozova	21–17, 21–15	(gold) Winner

BWF International Challenge tournament
BWF International Series tournament
