= 2018 BWF World Junior Championships – Girls' doubles =

2018 BWF World Junior Championships Girls' Doubles
Tournament details
- Dates: 12 – 18 November 2018
- Edition: 20th
- Level: International
- Venue: Markham Pan Am Centre
- Location: Markham, Canada

The girls' doubles of the tournament 2018 BWF World Junior Championships was held on 12–18 November. The defending champions from the last edition are Baek Ha-na / Lee Yu-rim from Korea.

== Seeds ==
1. (China) Liu Xuanxuan / Xia Yuting (champions)
2. (Indonesia) Febriana Dwipuji Kusuma / Ribka Sugiarto (semifinals)
3. (Malaysia) Pearly Tan Koong Le / Toh Ee Wei (final)
4. (Indonesia) Agatha Imanuela / Siti Fadia Silva Ramadhanti (semifinals)
5. (Denmark) Amalie Magelund / Freja Ravn (quarterfinals)
6. (Ukraine) Anastasiya Prozorova / Valeriya Rudakova (second round)
7. (China) Chen Yingying / Zhang Shuxian (quarterfinals)
8. (Netherlands) Milou Lugters / Alyssa Tirtosentono (second round)

9. (South Korea) Jang Eun-seo / Lee Jung-hyun (fourth round)
10. (Chinese Taipei) Li Zi-qing /Teng Chun-hsun (fourth round)
11. (Spain) Elena Andreu / Ana Carbon (second round)
12. (Indonesia) Nita Violina Marwah / Putri Syaikah (fourth round)
13. (Denmark) Christine Busch / Amalie Schulz (fourth round)
14. (France) Sharone Bauer / Ainoa Desmons (third round)
15. (Thailand) Pornpicha Choeikeewong / Pornnicha Suwatnodom (third round)
16. (France) Léonice Huet / Juliette Moinard (second round)

Click on the seed number of a player to go to their draw section.

== Draw ==
=== Finals ===
Quarterfinals
1	(China) Liu Xuanxuan (China) Xia Yuting	21	21
5	(Denmark) Amalie Magelund (Denmark) Freja Ravn	9	9
4	(Indonesia) Agatha Imanuela (Indonesia) Siti Fadia Silva Ramadhanti	21	21
(China) Chen Yingxue (China) Li Yijing	13	19
(Japan) Shiena Fukumoto (Japan) Natsu Saito	12	10
3	(Malaysia) Pearly Tan Koong Le (Malaysia) Toh Ee Wei	21	21
7	(China) Chen Yingying (China) Zhang Shuxian	21	9	15
2	(Indonesia) Febriana Dwipuji Kusuma (Indonesia) Ribka Sugiarto	14	21	21

Semifinals
1	(China) Liu Xuanxuan (China) Xia Yuting	21	21
4	(Indonesia) Agatha Imanuela (Indonesia) Siti Fadia Silva Ramadhanti	18	13
3	(Malaysia) Pearly Tan Koong Le (Malaysia) Toh Ee Wei	21	21
2	(Indonesia) Febriana Dwipuji Kusuma (Indonesia) Ribka Sugiarto	19	19

Finals
1	(China) Liu Xuanxuan (China) Xia Yuting	21	21
3	(Malaysia) Pearly Tan Koong Le (Malaysia) Toh Ee Wei	16	16

=== Top half ===
==== Section 1 ====
First round

Second round
1	(China) Liu XX (China) Xia YT	21	21
(Faroe Islands) A K M Pedersen (Faroe Islands) S Thomsen	5	3
(Sweden) T Sjoo (Sweden) E Urell	12	10
(Japan) C Uchiyama (Japan) R Yoshida	21	21
12	(Indonesia) N V Marwah (Indonesia) P Syaikah	21	21
(Netherlands) M Linders (Netherlands) M Versteeg	7	8
(Macau) Chio W U (Macau) Wong C W	9	11
(United States) M Huang (United States) A Lee	21	21

Third round
1	(China) Liu XX (China) Xia YT	21	21
(Japan) C Uchiyama (Japan) R Yoshida	17	15
12	(Indonesia) N V Marwah (Indonesia) P Syaikah	21	21
(United States) M Huang (United States) A Lee	17	7

Fourth round
1	(China) Liu XX (China) Xia YT	21	21
12	(Indonesia) N V Marwah (Indonesia) P Syaikah	12	17

==== Section 2 ====
First round
(Japan) S Kimura (Japan) Y Oishi	13	19
(South Korea) Jeong N-e (South Korea) Park G-e	21	21

Second round
5	(Denmark) A Magelund (Denmark) F Ravn	21	21
(New Zealand) R Apalisok (New Zealand) J Yu	13	2
(Peru) Y Y Cao (Peru) S Y C Chen	21	21
(Mexico) J J Bautista (Mexico) F Rio	12	19
15	(Thailand) P Choeikeewong (Thailand) P Suwatnodom	21	21
(Germany) L Michalski (Germany) T P Nguyen	8	14
(Slovakia) A Remenova (Slovakia) M Tarcalova	14	10
(South Korea) Jeong N-e (South Korea) Park G-e	21	21

Third round
5	(Denmark) A Magelund (Denmark) F Ravn	21	21
(Peru) Y Y Cao (Peru) S Y C Chen	11	10
15	(Thailand) P Choeikeewong (Thailand) P Suwatnodom	12	16
(South Korea) Jeong N-e (South Korea) Park G-e	21	21

Fourth round
5	(Denmark) A Magelund (Denmark) F Ravn	21	5	22
(South Korea) Jeong N-e (South Korea) Park G-e	15	21	20

==== Section 3 ====
First round

Second round
4	(Indonesia) A Imanuela (Indonesia) S F S Ramadhanti	21	21
(England) A Chaudhari (England) A Lado	15	9
(Czech Republic) L Krtapova (Czech Republic) K Zuzakova	21	21
(Kenya) K Ghia (Kenya) S Patel	3	3
11	(Spain) E Andreu (Spain) A Carbon	18	15
(Sri Lanka) D Dias (Sri Lanka) A Masakorala	21	21
(Hong Kong) Leung Y Y (Hong Kong) S S Mehta	15	21	12
(India) A Bhatt (India) T Crasto	21	13	21

Third round
4	(Indonesia) A Imanuela (Indonesia) S F S Ramadhanti	21	21
(Czech Republic) L Krtapova (Czech Republic) K Zuzakova	15	9
(Sri Lanka) D Dias (Sri Lanka) A Masakorala	20	10
(India) A Bhatt (India) T Crasto	22	21

Fourth round
4	(Indonesia) A Imanuela (Indonesia) S F S Ramadhanti	21	21
(India) A Bhatt (India) T Crasto	13	11

==== Section 4 ====
First round
(China) Chen YX (China) Li YJ	21	6
(India) A Bhat K. (India) S Jupudi	16	1^{r}

Second round
6	(Ukraine) A Prozorova (Ukraine) V Rudakova	19	16
(Chinese Taipei) Liang C-w (Chinese Taipei) Wang Y-q	21	21
(Poland) J Plawecka (Poland) J Podedworny	9	16
(Canada) C Lai (Canada) W Zhang	21	21
16	(France) L Huet (France) J Moinard	14	12
(Scotland) L Middleton (Scotland) S Sidebottom	21	21
(Australia) K Ea (Australia) A Yu	14	8
(China) Chen YX (China) Li YJ	21	21

Third round
(Chinese Taipei) Liang C-w (Chinese Taipei) Wang Y-q	21	17	21
(Canada) C Lai (Canada) W Zhang	13	21	11
(Scotland) L Middleton (Scotland) S Sidebottom	11	13
(China) Chen YX (China) Li YJ	21	21

Fourth round
(Chinese Taipei) Liang C-w (Chinese Taipei) Wang Y-q	13	16
(China) Chen YX (China) Li YJ	21	21

=== Bottom half ===
==== Section 5 ====
First round
(Thailand) S Chueboca (Thailand) S Silprakob	21	21
(Peru) M F Castillo (Peru) I Mendoza	8	8

Second round
(Thailand) S Chueboca (Thailand) S Silprakob	21	21
(Uganda) F S M Rafi (Uganda) T Naluwooza	4	1
(England) M Chapman (England) F Redfearn	20	12
13	(Denmark) C Busch (Denmark) A Schulz	22	21
(New Zealand) S Li (New Zealand) E Smith	13	13
(India) S Bandi (India) T Ramesh	21	21
(Japan) S Fukumoto (Japan) N Saito	21	21
8	(Netherlands) M Lugters (Netherlands) A Tirtosentono	8	13

Third round
(Thailand) S Chueboca (Thailand) S Silprakob	18	13
13	(Denmark) C Busch (Denmark) A Schulz	21	21
(India) S Bandi (India) T Ramesh	8	11
(Japan) S Fukumoto (Japan) N Saito	21	21

Fourth round
13	(Denmark) C Busch (Denmark) A Schulz	14	13
(Japan) S Fukumoto (Japan) N Saito	21	21

==== Section 6 ====
First round

Second round
(Austria) S Au Yeong (Austria) R Winkler	10	14
(Germany) E Moszczynski (Germany) J Petrikowski	21	21
(Australia) Z Fung (Australia) J Vega	15	16
14	(France) S Bauer (France) A Desmons	21	21
(Scotland) R Andrew (Scotland) R Sugden	17	8
(Thailand) B Aimsaard (Thailand) P Khantaruangsakul	21	21
(Brazil) J Lima (Brazil) S Lima	12	13
3	(Malaysia) P Tan (Malaysia) Toh E W	21	21

Third round
(Germany) E Moszczynski (Germany) J Petrikowski	21	21	21
14	(France) S Bauer (France) A Desmons	23	14	12
(Thailand) B Aimsaard (Thailand) P Khantaruangsakul	27	15
3	(Malaysia) P Tan (Malaysia) Toh E W	29	21

Fourth round
(Germany) E Moszczynski (Germany) J Petrikowski	10	11
3	(Malaysia) P Tan (Malaysia) Toh E W	21	21

==== Section 7 ====
First round
(Poland) A Foryta (Poland) D Kwasnik	21	21
(South Africa) M de Beer (South Africa) C Yiatses	10	9

Second round
(Poland) A Foryta (Poland) D Kwasnik	13	17
(Sweden) M Norrman (Sweden) A Pillai	21	21
(Singapore) B Lim (Singapore) J R Sito	13	15
9	(South Korea) Jang E-s (South Korea) Lee J-h	21	21
(South Korea) Kim A-y (South Korea) Kim S-j	21	21
(United States) S Pandey (United States) E Shi	17	12
(Sri Lanka) J Amanda (Sri Lanka) T A Ratnayaka	9	5
7	(China) Chen YY (China) Zhang SX	21	21

Third round
(Sweden) M Norrman (Sweden) A Pillai	9	5
9	(South Korea) Jang E-s (South Korea) Lee J-h	21	21
(South Korea) Kim A-y (South Korea) Kim S-j	13	10
7	(China) Chen YY (China) Zhang SX	21	21

Fourth round
9	(South Korea) Jang E-s (South Korea) Lee J-h	19	19
7	(China) Chen YY (China) Zhang SX	21	21

==== Section 8 ====
First round

Second round
(Mongolia) B Batbayar (Mongolia) M Lkhagvasuren	8	6
(Spain) N Diaz (Spain) C Leal	21	21
(Hungary) R Madarasz (Hungary) V Sandorhazi	15	11
10	(Chinese Taipei) Li Z-q (Chinese Taipei) Teng C-h	21	21
(Canada) K Ho-Shue (Canada) E Zhang	16	21	7
(Hong Kong) Leung S L (Hong Kong) Yeung P L	21	14	21
(Norway) S Macsali (Norway) E Waaland	16	11
2	(Indonesia) F D Kusuma (Indonesia) R Sugiarto	21	21

Third round
(Spain) N Diaz (Spain) C Leal	10	10
10	(Chinese Taipei) Li Z-q (Chinese Taipei) Teng C-h	21	21
(Hong Kong) Leung S L (Hong Kong) Yeung P L	15	18
2	(Indonesia) F D Kusuma (Indonesia) R Sugiarto	21	21

Fourth round
10	(Chinese Taipei) Li Z-q (Chinese Taipei) Teng C-h	18	15
2	(Indonesia) F D Kusuma (Indonesia) R Sugiarto	21	21
