= Putri Syaikah =

Indonesian badminton player

Personal information
- Nickname: Chika
- Born: Putri Syaikah Ulima Hidayat; 1 September 2001 (age 25) Padang, West Sumatra, Indonesia
- Height: 1.70 m (5 ft 7 in)
- Weight: 63 kg (139 lb)

Sport
- Country: Indonesia
- Sport: Badminton
- Handedness: Right

Women's doubles
- Highest ranking: 35 (with Nita Violina Marwah 9 November 2021)
- Current ranking: 54 (with Nita Violina Marwah 27 September 2022)
- BWF profile
Medal record
Women's badminton
Representing Indonesia
World Junior Championships
Gold medal – first place	2019 Kazan	Mixed team
Bronze medal – third place	2018 Markham	Mixed team
Asian Junior Championships
Silver medal – second place	2019 Suzhou	Mixed team
Bronze medal – third place	2018 Jakarta	Mixed team

Putri Syaikah Ulima Hidayat (born 1 September 2001) is an Indonesian badminton player affiliated with Exist Jakarta club. She was part of the national junior team that won the first Suhandinata Cup for Indonesia in 2019 BWF World Junior Championships.

== Career ==
In September 2023, Putri Syaikah and her partner Tryola Nadia lost at the first round of Indonesia Masters Super 100 I from Chinese Taipei pair Hung En-tzu and Lin Yu-pei in straight games.

== Achievements ==
=== BWF World Tour (1 runner-up) ===
The BWF World Tour, which was announced on 19 March 2017 and implemented in 2018, is a series of elite badminton tournaments sanctioned by the Badminton World Federation (BWF). The BWF World Tours are divided into levels of World Tour Finals, Super 1000, Super 750, Super 500, Super 300 (part of the HSBC World Tour), and the BWF Tour Super 100.

Women's doubles
Year	Tournament	Level	Partner	Opponent	Score	Result
2019	Akita Masters	Super 100	(Indonesia) Nita Violina Marwah	(Japan) Ayako Sakuramoto (Japan) Yukiko Takahata	17–21, 21–14, 15–21	(silver) Runner-up

=== BWF International Challenge/Series (3 titles) ===
Women's doubles
Year	Tournament	Partner	Opponent	Score	Result
2018	Turkey International	(Indonesia) Nita Violina Marwah	(Indonesia) Metya Inayah Cindiani (Indonesia) Indah Cahya Sari Jamil	21–15, 21–7	(gold) Winner
2019	Iran Fajr International	(Indonesia) Nita Violina Marwah	(Turkey) Bengisu Erçetin (Turkey) Nazlıcan İnci	21–17, 21–18	(gold) Winner
2019	Vietnam International	(Indonesia) Nita Violina Marwah	(Chinese Taipei) Hsieh Pei-shan (Chinese Taipei) Lin Xiao-min	21–19, 21–16	(gold) Winner

BWF International Challenge tournament
BWF International Series tournament

=== BWF Junior International (1 title, 2 runners-up) ===
Girls' doubles
Year	Tournament	Partner	Opponent	Score	Result
2019	Dutch Junior International	(Indonesia) Nita Violina Marwah	(China) Luo Xumin (China) Zhou Xinru	21–16, 21–16	(gold) Winner
2019	German Junior	(Indonesia) Nita Violina Marwah	(China) Guo Lizhi (China) Li Yijing	21–16, 19–21, 20–22	(silver) Runner-up
2019	Jaya Raya Junior International	(Indonesia) Nita Violina Marwah	(China) Luo Xumin (China) Zhou Xinru	16–21, 18–21	(silver) Runner-up

BWF Junior International Grand Prix tournament
BWF Junior International Challenge tournament
BWF Junior International Series tournament
BWF Junior Future Series tournament

== Performance timeline ==
Key

W	Won	F	Finalist	SF	Semi-finalist
QF	Quarter-finalist	#R	Rounds 4, 3, 2, 1	RR	Round-robin stage
Q#	Qualification round	A	Absent	w/d	Withdrew
G	Gold	S	Silver	B	Bronze
NH	Not held	N/A	Not applicable	DNQ	Did not qualify

=== National team ===
- Junior level

Team events	2018	2019
Asian Junior Championships	B	S
World Junior Championships	B	G

- Senior level

Team events	2020	2021	2022
Uber Cup	QF	NH	A

=== Individual competitions ===
==== Junior level ====
Event	2018	2019
Asian Junior Championships	2R	2R
World Junior Championships	4R	QF

==== Senior level ====
===== Women's doubles =====
Events	2021	2022
World Championships	A	A

Tournament	BWF World Tour						Best	Ref
Tournament	2018	2019	2020	2021	2022	2023	Best	Ref
Indonesia Masters	A		Q1	1R	A		1R ('21)	
Spain Masters	A			QF	NH	A	QF ('21)	
Orléans Masters	A		NH	2R	A		2R ('21)	
Indonesia Open	A		NH	1R	A		1R ('21)	
Indonesia Masters Super 100	2R	A	NH		A	1R	2R ('18)	
Denmark Open	A			2R	A		2R ('21)	
French Open	A		NH	2R	A		2R ('21)	
Hylo Open	A			QF	A		QF ('21)	
Akita Masters	A	F	NH			NA	F ('19)	
Macau Open	A	1R	NH			NA	1R ('19)	
Year-end ranking	154	57	62	37	—N/a		35	
Tournament	2018	2019	2020	2021	2022	2023	Best	
