= 2024 Swiss Open (badminton) =

Badminton tournament in Switzerland

Tournament details
- Dates: 19–24 March
- Edition: 61st
- Level: Super 300
- Total prize money: US$210,000
- Venue: St. Jakobshalle
- Location: Basel, Switzerland

Champions
- Men's singles: (Chinese Taipei) Lin Chun-yi
- Women's singles: (Spain) Carolina Marín
- Men's doubles: (England) Ben Lane (England) Sean Vendy
- Women's doubles: (Indonesia) Lanny Tria Mayasari (Indonesia) Ribka Sugiarto
- Mixed doubles: (Malaysia) Goh Soon Huat (Malaysia) Shevon Jemie Lai

The 2024 Swiss Open (officially known as the Yonex Swiss Open 2024 for sponsorship reasons) is a badminton tournament that took place at the St. Jakobshalle, Basel, Switzerland, from 19 to 24 March 2024 and had a total prize of US$210,000.

== Tournament ==
The 2024 Swiss Open is the ninth tournament of the 2024 BWF World Tour and was part of the Swiss Open championships, which had been held since 1955. This tournament was organized by the Swiss Badminton with sanction from the BWF.

=== Venue ===
This tournament will be held at the St. Jakobshalle in Basel, Switzerland.

=== Point distribution ===
Below is the point distribution table for each phase of the tournament based on the BWF points system for the BWF World Tour Super 300 event.

Winner	Runner-up	3/4	5/8	9/16	17/32	33/64	65/128
7,000	5,950	4,900	3,850	2,750	1,670	660	320

=== Prize pool ===
The total prize money is US$210,000 with the distribution of the prize money in accordance with BWF regulations.

Event	Winner	Finalist	Semi-finals	Quarter-finals	Last 16
Singles	$15,750	$7,980	$3,045	$1,260	$735
Doubles	$16,590	$7,980	$2,940	$1,522.5	$787.5

== Men's singles ==
=== Seeds ===
1. (Malaysia) Lee Zii Jia (second round)
2. (Japan) Kenta Nishimoto (second round)
3. (Singapore) Loh Kean Yew (first round)
4. (Hong Kong) Lee Cheuk Yiu (first round)
5. (Chinese Taipei) Chou Tien-chen (final)
6. (Japan) Kanta Tsuneyama (first round)
7. (India) Lakshya Sen (second round)
8. (Japan) Koki Watanabe (first round)

=== Wildcard ===
Swiss Badminton awarded a wildcard entry to Tobias Künzi.

=== Finals ===
Semi-finals
(India) Srikanth Kidambi	21	9	18
(Chinese Taipei) Lin Chun-yi	15	21	21
5	(Chinese Taipei) Chou Tien-chen	19	21	21
(Denmark) Rasmus Gemke	21	11	12

Final
(Chinese Taipei) Lin Chun-yi	7	22	23
5	(Chinese Taipei) Chou Tien-chen	21	20	21

=== Top half ===
==== Section 1 ====
First round
1	(Malaysia) Lee Z J	21	21
(Chinese Taipei) Su L-y	19	12
(Chinese Taipei) Wang T-w	17	18
(India) S Kidambi	21	21
7	(India) L Sen	21	15	21
(Malaysia) Leong J H	19	21	11
(France) T J Popov	20	11
(Chinese Taipei) Lee C-h	22	21

Second round
1	(Malaysia) Lee Z J	16	15
(India) S Kidambi	21	21
7	(India) L Sen	17	15
(Chinese Taipei) Lee C-h	21	21

Quarter-finals
(India) S Kidambi	21	21
(Chinese Taipei) Lee C-h	10	14

==== Section 2 ====
First round
3	(Singapore) Loh K Y	18	13
(Chinese Taipei) Lin C-y	21	21
(Chinese Taipei) Chi Y-j	21	21
Q4	(Japan) Y Tanaka	18	12
6	(Japan) K Tsuneyama	14	12
Q2	(Indonesia) A Farhan	21	21
(Denmark) M Johannesen	18	21	21
(France) A Merklé	21	18	19

Second round
(Chinese Taipei) Lin C-y	17	21	21
(Chinese Taipei) Chi Y-j	21	11	19
Q2	(Indonesia) A Farhan	18	17
(Denmark) M Johannesen	21	21

Quarter-finals
(Chinese Taipei) Lin C-y	21	21
(Denmark) M Johannesen	18	7

=== Bottom half ===
==== Section 3 ====
First round
Q3	(South Korea) Jeon H-j	21	21
(Thailand) K Wangcharoen	15	8
(France) C Popov	21	16	17
5	(Chinese Taipei) Chou T-c	13	21	21
PFQ	(Belgium) J Carraggi	19	9
(China) Lei LX	21	21
(India) P Rajawat	21	21
4	(Hong Kong) Lee C Y	12	15

Second round
Q3	(South Korea) Jeon H-j	16	21	16
5	(Chinese Taipei) Chou T-c	21	12	21
(China) Lei LX	14	13
(India) P Rajawat	21	21

Quarter-finals
5	(Chinese Taipei) Chou T-c	21	21
(India) P Rajawat	15	19

==== Section 4 ====
First round
(India) K George	21	21
(Japan) T Obayashi	18	19
(France) A Lanier	22	18	21
8	(Japan) K Watanabe	20	21	19
Q1	(Chinese Taipei) Huang Y-k	15	16
(Denmark) R Gemke	21	21
WC	(Switzerland) T Künzi	13	19
2	(Japan) K Nishimoto	21	21

Second round
(India) K George	18	22	21
(France) A Lanier	21	20	18
(Denmark) R Gemke	21	14	21
2	(Japan) K Nishimoto	13	21	18

Quarter-finals
(India) K George	23	17	15
(Denmark) R Gemke	21	21	21

== Women's singles ==
=== Seeds ===
1. (Spain) Carolina Marín (champion)
2. (Indonesia) Gregoria Mariska Tunjung (final)
3. (United States) Beiwen Zhang (quarter-finals)
4. (India) P. V. Sindhu (second round)
5. (Japan) Aya Ohori (quarter-finals)
6. (South Korea) Kim Ga-eun (quarter-finals)
7. (Thailand) Ratchanok Intanon (first round)
8. (Thailand) Pornpawee Chochuwong (quarter-finals)

=== Finals ===
Semi-finals
1	(Spain) Carolina Marín	21	21
(Japan) Tomoka Miyazaki	18	12
(Japan) Nozomi Okuhara	15	17
2	(Indonesia) Gregoria Mariska Tunjung	21	21

Final
1	(Spain) Carolina Marín	21	13	22
2	(Indonesia) Gregoria Mariska Tunjung	19	21	20

=== Top half ===
==== Section 1 ====
First round
1	(Spain) C Marín	21	21
(Chinese Taipei) Lin H-t	15	10
Q1	(Chinese Taipei) Liang T-y	15	21	11
(Chinese Taipei) Sung S-y	21	19	21
6	(South Korea) Kim G-e	21	21
(Myanmar) Thet Htar T	15	10
(Denmark) L Christophersen	21	16	21
Q3	(United States) L Lam	14	21	10

Second round
1	(Spain) C Marín	21	21
(Chinese Taipei) Sung S-y	11	14
6	(South Korea) Kim G-e	21	18	24
(Denmark) L Christophersen	10	21	22

Quarter-finals
1	(Spain) C Marín	21	21
6	(South Korea) Kim G-e	19	18

==== Section 2 ====
First round
4	(India) P. V. Sindhu	21	21
PFQ	(Thailand) P Choeikeewong	12	13
(Japan) T Miyazaki	7	21	21
Q2	(Japan) M Suizu	21	16	19
5	(Japan) A Ohori	21	21
(Thailand) B Ongbamrungphan	15	9
(Denmark) L Kjærsfeldt	13	21	21
(Japan) N Nidaira	21	18	15

Second round
4	(India) P. V. Sindhu	21	19	16
(Japan) T Miyazaki	16	21	21
5	(Japan) A Ohori	20	21	21
(Denmark) L Kjærsfeldt	22	8	16

Quarter-finals
(Japan) T Miyazaki	21	18	21
5	(Japan) A Ohori	17	21	17

=== Bottom half ===
==== Section 3 ====
First round
PFQ	(Belgium) L Tan	13	15
PFQ	(Canada) W Y Zhang	21	21
(Japan) N Okuhara	21	22
7	(Thailand) R Intanon	13	20
(Thailand) S Katethong	22	21
(Denmark) M Blichfeldt	20	17
Q4	(Japan) A Takahashi	18	20
3	(United States) BW Zhang	21	22

Second round
PFQ	(Canada) W Y Zhang	6	15
(Japan) N Okuhara	21	21
(Thailand) S Katethong	21	16	10
3	(United States) BW Zhang	19	21	21

Quarter-finals
(Japan) N Okuhara	21	22
3	(United States) BW Zhang	17	20

==== Section 4 ====
First round
PFQ	(Denmark) J D Jakobsen	21	12
(Chinese Taipei) Pai Y-p	17	8^{r}
(Indonesia) P K Wardani	11	10
8	(Thailand) P Chochuwong	21	21
(Vietnam) Nguyễn T L	21	19	21
(Indonesia) E N T Wardoyo	16	21	19
(Chinese Taipei) Hsu W-c	12	15
2	(Indonesia) G M Tunjung	21	21

Second round
PFQ	(Denmark) J D Jakobsen	15	17
8	(Thailand) P Chochuwong	21	21
(Vietnam) Nguyễn T L	6	13
2	(Indonesia) G M Tunjung	21	21

Quarter-finals
8	(Thailand) P Chochuwong	13	13
2	(Indonesia) G M Tunjung	21	21

== Men's doubles ==
=== Seeds ===
1. (Indonesia) Muhammad Shohibul Fikri / Bagas Maulana (final)
2. (Chinese Taipei) Lee Yang / Wang Chi-lin (quarter-finals)
3. (Indonesia) Leo Rolly Carnando / Daniel Marthin (semi-finals)
4. (Malaysia) Ong Yew Sin / Teo Ee Yi (withdrew)
5. (Japan) Akira Koga / Taichi Saito (withdrew)
6. (Malaysia) Man Wei Chong / Tee Kai Wun (quarter-finals)
7. (Malaysia) Goh Sze Fei / Nur Izzuddin (second round)
8. (England) Ben Lane / Sean Vendy (champions)

=== Finals ===
Semi-finals
1	(Indonesia) Muhammad Shohibul Fikri (Indonesia) Bagas Maulana	21	21
3	(Indonesia) Leo Rolly Carnando (Indonesia) Daniel Marthin	19	15
(Indonesia) Sabar Karyaman Gutama (Indonesia) Muhammad Reza Pahlevi Isfahani	22	8	15
8	(England) Ben Lane (England) Sean Vendy	20	21	21

Final
1	(Indonesia) Muhammad Shohibul Fikri (Indonesia) Bagas Maulana	22	26
8	(England) Ben Lane (England) Sean Vendy	24	28

=== Top half ===
==== Section 1 ====
First round
1	(Indonesia) M S Fikri (Indonesia) B Maulana	21	21
Q2	(China) Huang D (China) Liu Yi	16	18
(United States) V Chiu (United States) J Yuan	11	19
Q3	(Chinese Taipei) Lu M-c (Chinese Taipei) Tang K-w	21	21
7	(Malaysia) Goh S F (Malaysia) N Izzuddin	22	21
(Canada) A Dong (Canada) N Yakura	20	18
(Thailand) S Jomkoh (Thailand) K Kedren	21	21
(France) L Corvée (France) R Labar	12	16

Second round
1	(Indonesia) M S Fikri (Indonesia) B Maulana	21	21
Q3	(Chinese Taipei) Lu M-c (Chinese Taipei) Tang K-w	18	15
7	(Malaysia) Goh S F (Malaysia) N Izzuddin	21	19	15
(Thailand) S Jomkoh (Thailand) K Kedren	17	21	21

Quarter-finals
1	(Indonesia) M S Fikri (Indonesia) B Maulana	21	21
(Thailand) S Jomkoh (Thailand) K Kedren	19	11

==== Section 2 ====
First round
3	(Indonesia) L R Carnando (Indonesia) D Marthin	21	19	21
(Japan) S Mezaki (Japan) H Nishida	16	21	11
(Malaysia) Low H Y (Malaysia) Ng E C	21	21
(Mexico) J Castillo (Mexico) L Montoya	8	18
6	(Malaysia) Man W C (Malaysia) Tee K W	20	21	21
(Chinese Taipei) Lee F-c (Chinese Taipei) Lee F-j	22	11	19
(Malaysia) J Arif (Malaysia) Yap R K	21	21
(Denmark) A Søndergaard (Denmark) J Toft	19	18

Second round
3	(Indonesia) L R Carnando (Indonesia) D Marthin	16	21	21
(Malaysia) Low H Y (Malaysia) Ng E C	21	13	12
6	(Malaysia) Man W C (Malaysia) Tee K W	21	21
(Malaysia) J Arif (Malaysia) Yap R K	10	11

Quarter-finals
3	(Indonesia) L R Carnando (Indonesia) D Marthin	21	23
6	(Malaysia) Man W C (Malaysia) Tee K W	14	21

=== Bottom half ===
==== Section 3 ====
First round
(China) Xie HN (China) Zeng WH	21	14	21
Q4	(China) Chen BY (China) Liu Ya	16	21	10
(Indonesia) S K Gutama (Indonesia) M R P Isfahani	21	21
PFQ	(Republic of Ireland) J Magee (Republic of Ireland) P Reynolds	8	19
(Thailand) P Kaosamaang (Thailand) W Thongsa-nga	21	16	21
(France) C Popov (France) T J Popov	16	21	15
(Malaysia) Choong H J (Malaysia) M Haikal	21	21
PFQ	(Algeria) K Mammeri (Algeria) Y S Medel	14	10

Second round
(China) Xie HN (China) Zeng WH	21	14	19
(Indonesia) S K Gutama (Indonesia) M R P Isfahani	15	21	21
(Thailand) P Kaosamaang (Thailand) W Thongsa-nga	12	17
(Malaysia) Choong H J (Malaysia) M Haikal	21	21

Quarter-finals
(Indonesia) S K Gutama (Indonesia) M R P Isfahani	21	22
(Malaysia) Choong H J (Malaysia) M Haikal	16	20

==== Section 4 ====
First round
PFQ	(Chinese Taipei) Lu C (Chinese Taipei) Po L-w	15	17
(Chinese Taipei) Wei C-w (Chinese Taipei) Wu G-x	21	21
(Germany) B Geiss (Germany) J C Völker	9	14
8	(England) B Lane (England) S Vendy	21	21
(Japan) K Mitsuhashi (Japan) H Okamura	21	21
Q1	(India) H Amsakarunan (India) R K Rethinasabapathi	19	14
(Brazil) F Farias (Brazil) D Silva	7	9
2	(Chinese Taipei) Lee Y (Chinese Taipei) Wang C-l	21	21

Second round
(Chinese Taipei) Wei C-w (Chinese Taipei) Wu G-x	17	21
8	(England) B Lane (England) S Vendy	21	23
(Japan) K Mitsuhashi (Japan) H Okamura	19	21	17
2	(Chinese Taipei) Lee Y (Chinese Taipei) Wang C-l	21	19	21

Quarter-finals
8	(England) B Lane (England) S Vendy	21	21
2	(Chinese Taipei) Lee Y (Chinese Taipei) Wang C-l	18	16

== Women's doubles ==
=== Seeds ===
1. (Indonesia) Apriyani Rahayu / Siti Fadia Silva Ramadhanti (semi-finals)
2. (Japan) Rin Iwanaga / Kie Nakanishi (quarter-finals)
3. (Indonesia) Febriana Dwipuji Kusuma / Amallia Cahaya Pratiwi (second round)
4. (Hong Kong) Yeung Nga Ting / Yeung Pui Lam (second round)
5. (Denmark) Maiken Fruergaard / Sara Thygesen (first round)
6. (India) Tanisha Crasto / Ashwini Ponnappa (second round)
7. (France) Margot Lambert / Anne Tran (quarter-finals)
8. (India) Treesa Jolly / Gayatri Gopichand (quarter-finals)

=== Finals ===
Semi-finals
1	(Indonesia) Apriyani Rahayu (Indonesia) Siti Fadia Silva Ramadhanti	21	10	21
(Indonesia) Lanny Tria Mayasari (Indonesia) Ribka Sugiarto	13	21	23
(Australia) Setyana Mapasa (Australia) Angela Yu	12	13
(Chinese Taipei) Hsu Ya-ching (Chinese Taipei) Lin Wan-ching	21	21

Final
(Indonesia) Lanny Tria Mayasari (Indonesia) Ribka Sugiarto	13	21	21
(Chinese Taipei) Hsu Ya-ching (Chinese Taipei) Lin Wan-ching	21	16	8

=== Top half ===
==== Section 1 ====
First round
1	(Indonesia) A Rahayu (Indonesia) S F S Ramadhanti	21	21
(India) R Panda (India) S Panda	4	6
(United States) F Corbett (United States) A Lee	21	21
PFQ	(South Africa) A Ackerman (South Africa) D Laurens	7	10
7	(France) M Lambert (France) A Tran	21	21
Q1	(Switzerland) J Jann (Switzerland) L Zarrouk	10	14
(United States) P L Cao Hok (United States) L Lam	21	21
PFQ	(Uganda) H Kobugabe (Uganda) G Mbabazi	12	10

Second round
1	(Indonesia) A Rahayu (Indonesia) S F S Ramadhanti	21	21
(United States) F Corbett (United States) A Lee	9	15
7	(France) M Lambert (France) A Tran	21	19	21
(United States) P L Cao Hok (United States) L Lam	10	21	14

Quarter-finals
1	(Indonesia) A Rahayu (Indonesia) S F S Ramadhanti	21	21
7	(France) M Lambert (France) A Tran	13	13

==== Section 2 ====
First round
4	(Hong Kong) Yeung N T (Hong Kong) Yeung P L	21	16	21
(India) K A Bhat (India) S Gautam	13	21	14
PFQ	(India) S Singhi (India) R Thaker	17	7
(Indonesia) L T Mayasari (Indonesia) R Sugiarto	21	21
6	(India) T Crasto (India) A Ponnappa	21	12	21
(Indonesia) M T Puspita Sari (Indonesia) R A Rose	18	21	19
(Japan) R Hirokami (Japan) Y Kato	21	21
(Brazil) J Lima (Brazil) S Lima	12	18

Second round
4	(Hong Kong) Yeung N T (Hong Kong) Yeung P L	12	13
(Indonesia) L T Mayasari (Indonesia) R Sugiarto	21	21
6	(India) T Crasto (India) A Ponnappa	17	16
(Japan) R Hirokami (Japan) Y Kato	21	21

Quarter-finals
(Indonesia) L T Mayasari (Indonesia) R Sugiarto	21	21
(Japan) R Hirokami (Japan) Y Kato	18	17

=== Bottom half ===
==== Section 3 ====
First round
Q4	(Chinese Taipei) Huang Y-h (Chinese Taipei) Liang T-y	13	19
(India) P Konjengbam (India) S Mishra	21	21
(United States) A Xu (United States) K Xu	15	12
8	(India) T Jolly (India) G Gopichand	21	21
(China) Keng SL (China) Zhang C	19	17
(Australia) S Mapasa (Australia) A Yu	21	21
Q3	(Denmark) N P Anthonisen (Netherlands) A Tirtosentono	16	22	18
3	(Indonesia) F D Kusuma (Indonesia) A C Pratiwi	21	20	21

Second round
(India) P Konjengbam (India) S Mishra	10	12
8	(India) T Jolly (India) G Gopichand	21	21
(Australia) S Mapasa (Australia) A Yu	23	13	21
3	(Indonesia) F D Kusuma (Indonesia) A C Pratiwi	21	21	17

Quarter-finals
8	(India) T Jolly (India) G Gopichand	14	15
(Australia) S Mapasa (Australia) A Yu	21	21

==== Section 4 ====
First round
(Chinese Taipei) Hsu Y-c (Chinese Taipei) Lin W-c	21	21
Q2	(France) E Jacob (France) C Pognante	16	10
(Indonesia) J P Miantoro (Indonesia) F Setianingrum	18	21	21
5	(Denmark) M Fruergaard (Denmark) S Thygesen	21	15	14
(Chinese Taipei) Lee C-h (Chinese Taipei) Teng C-h	13	21	21
(China) Wang TG (China) Wang YD	21	18	12
(Chinese Taipei) Chang C-h (Chinese Taipei) Yang C-t	15	15
2	(Japan) R Iwanaga (Japan) K Nakanishi	21	21

Second round
(Chinese Taipei) Hsu Y-c (Chinese Taipei) Lin W-c	21	21
(Indonesia) J P Miantoro (Indonesia) F Setianingrum	14	17
(Chinese Taipei) Lee C-h (Chinese Taipei) Teng C-h	18	14
2	(Japan) R Iwanaga (Japan) K Nakanishi	21	21

Quarter-finals
(Chinese Taipei) Hsu Y-c (Chinese Taipei) Lin W-c	21	17	21
2	(Japan) R Iwanaga (Japan) K Nakanishi	17	21	13

== Mixed doubles ==
=== Seeds ===
1. (China) Jiang Zhenbang / Wei Yaxin (withdrew)
2. (Thailand) Dechapol Puavaranukroh / Sapsiree Taerattanachai (first round)
3. (Malaysia) Chen Tang Jie / Toh Ee Wei (final)
4. (Denmark) Mathias Christiansen / Alexandra Bøje (quarter-finals)
5. (Japan) Hiroki Midorikawa / Natsu Saito (quarter-finals)
6. (Chinese Taipei) Ye Hong-wei / Lee Chia-hsin (semi-finals)
7. (France) Thom Gicquel / Delphine Delrue (first round)
8. (Malaysia) Goh Soon Huat / Shevon Jemie Lai (champions)

=== Wildcard ===
Swiss Badminton awarded a wildcard entry to Minh Quang Pham and Aline Müller.

=== Finals ===
Semi-finals
6	(Chinese Taipei) Ye Hong-wei (Chinese Taipei) Lee Chia-hsin	16	12
3	(Malaysia) Chen Tang Jie (Malaysia) Toh Ee Wei	21	21
8	(Malaysia) Goh Soon Huat (Malaysia) Shevon Jemie Lai	21	21
(Netherlands) Robin Tabeling (Netherlands) Selena Piek	18	16

Final
3	(Malaysia) Chen Tang Jie (Malaysia) Toh Ee Wei	16	13
8	(Malaysia) Goh Soon Huat (Malaysia) Shevon Jemie Lai	21	21

=== Top half ===
==== Section 1 ====
First round
PFQ	(Algeria) K Mammeri (Algeria) T Mammeri	13	7
Q2	(China) Cheng X (China) Zhang C	21	21
(Indonesia) D Ferdinansyah (Indonesia) G E Widjaja	21	21
(England) M Ellis (England) L Smith	12	10
6	(Chinese Taipei) Ye H-w (Chinese Taipei) Lee C-h	19	21	21
(Indonesia) R Rivaldy (Indonesia) P H Mentari	21	15	15
(Indonesia) A Maulana (Indonesia) N V Marwah	15	19
(Japan) Y Kaneko (Japan) M Matsutomo	21	21

Second round
Q2	(China) Cheng X (China) Zhang C	21	21
(Indonesia) D Ferdinansyah (Indonesia) G E Widjaja	18	14
6	(Chinese Taipei) Ye H-w (Chinese Taipei) Lee C-h	16	22	21
(Japan) Y Kaneko (Japan) M Matsutomo	21	20	17

Quarter-finals
Q2	(China) Cheng X (China) Zhang C	18	21	19
6	(Chinese Taipei) Ye H-w (Chinese Taipei) Lee C-h	21	16	21

==== Section 2 ====
First round
3	(Malaysia) Chen T J (Malaysia) Toh E W	21	19	21
(Singapore) T Hee (Singapore) J Tan	12	21	15
PFQ	(Malaysia) Yap R K (Malaysia) V Siow	18	21	19
PFQ	(India) S K Karunakaran (India) A Variyath	21	11	21
7	(France) T Gicquel (France) D Delrue	14	18
(Thailand) S Jomkoh (Thailand) S Paewsampran	21	21
(United States) V Chiu (United States) J Gai	26	17	12
(Chinese Taipei) Chang K-c (Chinese Taipei) Lee C-c	24	21	21

Second round
3	(Malaysia) Chen T J (Malaysia) Toh E W	21	21
PFQ	(India) S K Karunakaran (India) A Variyath	17	14
(Thailand) S Jomkoh (Thailand) S Paewsampran	21	21
(Chinese Taipei) Chang K-c (Chinese Taipei) Lee C-c	19	10

Quarter-finals
3	(Malaysia) Chen T J (Malaysia) Toh E W	21	17	21
(Thailand) S Jomkoh (Thailand) S Paewsampran	18	21	15

=== Bottom half ===
==== Section 3 ====
First round
WC	(Switzerland) M Q Pham (Switzerland) A Müller	6^{r}
(Japan) H Nishi (Japan) A Sato	16
(Australia) K Choo (Australia) G Somerville	19	16
8	(Malaysia) Goh S H (Malaysia) S J Lai	21	21
Q4	(Germany) M Bourakkadi (Germany) L Michalski	4	9
(Indonesia) R N Kusharjanto (Indonesia) L A Kusumawati	21	21
(Denmark) J Toft (Denmark) C Graversen	15	10
4	(Denmark) M Christiansen (Denmark) A Bøje	21	21

Second round
(Japan) H Nishi (Japan) A Sato	17	21	11
8	(Malaysia) Goh S H (Malaysia) S J Lai	21	19	21
(Indonesia) R N Kusharjanto (Indonesia) L A Kusumawati	19	16
4	(Denmark) M Christiansen (Denmark) A Bøje	21	21

Quarter-finals
8	(Malaysia) Goh S H (Malaysia) S J Lai	21	21
4	(Denmark) M Christiansen (Denmark) A Bøje	15	10

==== Section 4 ====
First round
(Malaysia) Hoo P R (Malaysia) Cheng S Y	17	16
(Malaysia) Chan P S (Malaysia) Cheah Y S	21	21
Q1	(Chinese Taipei) Po L-w (Chinese Taipei) Chang C-h	16	15
5	(Japan) H Midorikawa (Japan) N Saito	21	21
(Thailand) R Oupthong (Thailand) J Sudjaipraparat	14	13
(Netherlands) R Tabeling (Netherlands) S Piek	21	21
Q3	(India) B S Reddy (India) N S Reddy	11
2	(Thailand) D Puavaranukroh (Thailand) S Taerattanachai	3^{r}

Second round
(Malaysia) Chan P S (Malaysia) Cheah Y S	22	21	19
5	(Japan) H Midorikawa (Japan) N Saito	24	11	21
(Netherlands) R Tabeling (Netherlands) S Piek	21	21
Q3	(India) B S Reddy (India) N S Reddy	11	14

Quarter-finals
5	(Japan) H Midorikawa (Japan) N Saito	19	21	18
(Netherlands) R Tabeling (Netherlands) S Piek	21	19	21

Preceded by 2024 All England Open; 2024 Orléans Masters	BWF World Tour; 2024 BWF season	Succeeded by 2024 Spain Masters
