= Ribka Sugiarto =

Indonesian badminton player (born 2000)

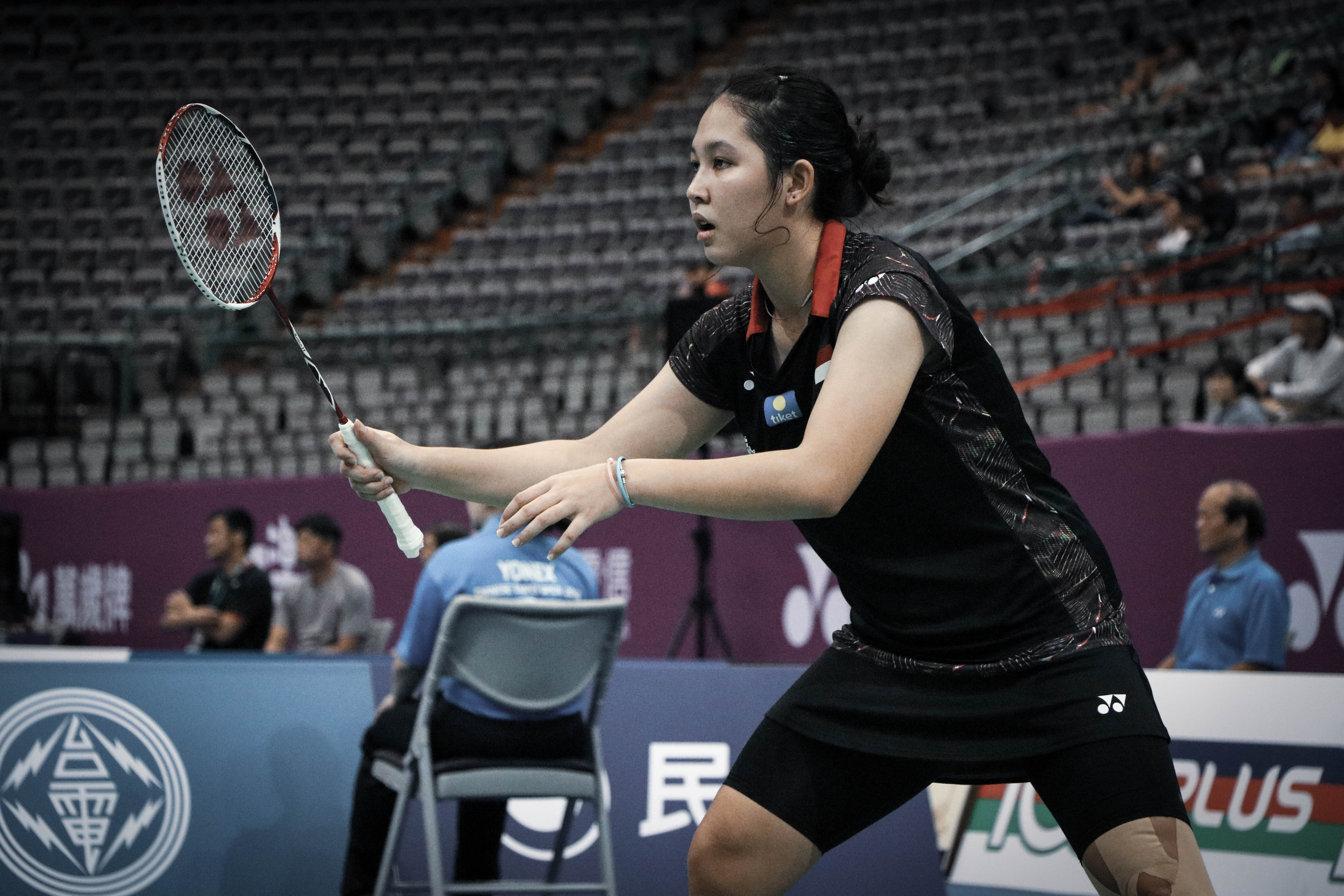
- Sugiarto at the 2018 Chinese Taipei Open

Personal information
- Born: 22 January 2000 (age 26) Karanganyar Regency, Central Java, Indonesia
- Height: 1.60 m (5 ft 3 in)
- Spouse: Muhammad Rian Ardianto (m. 2024)

Sport
- Country: Indonesia
- Sport: Badminton
- Handedness: Right

Women's doubles
- Highest ranking: 25 (with Lanny Tria Mayasari, 10 October 2023); 26 (with Siti Fadia Silva Ramadhanti, 9 November 2021)
- Current ranking: 27 (with Lanny Tria Mayasari, 9 April 2024)
- BWF profile
Medal record
Women's badminton
Representing Indonesia
Uber Cup
| Silver medal – second place | 2024 Chengdu | Women's team |
Asia Team Championships
| Bronze medal – third place | 2024 Selangor | Women's team |
SEA Games
| Silver medal – second place | 2019 Philippines | Women's team |
| Silver medal – second place | 2021 Vietnam | Women's team |
World Junior Championships
| Silver medal – second place | 2017 Yogyakarta | Girls' doubles |
| Bronze medal – third place | 2018 Markham | Girls' doubles |
| Bronze medal – third place | 2018 Markham | Mixed team |
Asian Junior Championships
| Gold medal – first place | 2018 Jakarta | Girls' doubles |
| Silver medal – second place | 2017 Jakarta | Mixed team |
| Bronze medal – third place | 2017 Jakarta | Girls' doubles |
| Bronze medal – third place | 2018 Jakarta | Mixed team |

Ribka Sugiarto (born 22 January 2000) is a former Indonesian badminton player specializing in doubles. Born in Karanganyar, she was selected to join the Djarum club in 2013. Sugiarto was the gold medalist at the 2018 Asian Junior Championships partnered with Febriana Dwipuji Kusuma, and won her first senior international title in 2019 Indonesia Masters, a Super 100 tournament with Siti Fadia Silva Ramadhanti.

== Career ==
In September–October 2021, Sugiarto alongside the Indonesian team competed at the 2021 Sudirman Cup in Vantaa, Finland. She won a match in the group stage against Evgeniya Kosetskaya and Ekaterina Malkova of Russia. Indonesia advanced to the knockout stage but lost at the quarterfinals against Malaysia.

=== 2022 ===
In June, Ribka Sugiarto was paired with Febby Valencia Dwijayanti Gani and lost in the quarter-finals of Indonesia Masters. In July, they also lost in the quarter-finals of Malaysia Open.

In October, Ribka Sugiarto was paired with Lanny Tria Mayasari and lost in the second round of 2022 Vietnam Open, but won the Malang Indonesia International, her first senior title. In December, they won their second titles at the Bahrain International Challenge.

=== 2023 ===
Sugiarto and her partner, Lanny Tria Mayasari, started the BWF tour in the home tournament, Indonesia Masters, but lost in the second round from Indian pair Tanisha Crasto and Ashwini Ponnappa. In the next tournament, they lost in the quarter-finals of the Thailand Masters from Korean pair Baek Ha-na and Lee So-hee.

In February, Sugiarto join the Indonesia national team to compete at the Asia Mixed Team Championships, but unfortunately the teams lost in the quarter-finals to South Korea.

In March, Sugiarto and Mayasari competed in the Europe tour at the Swiss Open but lost in the first round from fellow Indonesian pair Febriana Dwipuji Kusuma and Amalia Cahaya Pratiwi. In the next tour, they competed in the Spain Masters, but had to lose in the first round again from Thai pair Supissara Paewsampran and Puttita Supajirakul.

In April, Sugiarto and Mayasari competed at the Orléans Masters in France, but had to lose in the semi-finals from Chinese youngster pair Liu Shengshu and Tan Ning. In late April, they competed at the Asian Championships in Dubai, United Arab Emirates, but had to lose in the first round from Indian pair Treesa Jolly and Gayatri Gopichand.

In May, Sugiarto alongside the Indonesian team competed at the 2023 Sudirman Cup in Suzhou, China. She played a match in the group stage, won against Catherine Choi and Michelle Li of Canada. Indonesia advanced to the knockout stage but lost at the quarterfinals against China. In the following week, Sugiarto and Mayasari competed in the second Asian Tour at the Malaysia Masters. Unfortunately, they lost in the first round from Korean pair Baek Ha-na and Lee So-hee. In the next tour, they lost in the second round of the Thailand Open from 1st seed Korean pair Kim So-yeong and Kong Hee-yong.

In June, Sugiarto and Mayasari competed at the Singapore Open, but lost in the first round from fellow Indonesian pair Febriana Dwipuji Kusuma and Amalia Cahaya Pratiwi. In the next tour, they competed at the home tournament, Indonesia Open, but lost in the first round from fellow Indonesian pair Febriana Dwipuji Kusuma and Amalia Cahaya Pratiwi for second consecutive tournament and third time which makes their head to head became 3–1.

In late August, Sugiarto and Mayasari competed at the World Championships, but lost in the second round from 1st seed Chinese pair and defending world champions Chen Qingchen and Jia Yifan.

=== 2024 ===
She was selected as a member of the Indonesian women's team at the Asia Team Championships in February, and the Uber Cup in May, where the team won a bronze medal at the Asian Championships, and then made history by reaching the final at the Uber Cup since 2008. In the final Indonesia lost to China 0–3.

== Personal life ==
Sugiarto has been in a relationship with fellow shuttler Muhammad Rian Ardianto since 2020. The couple became officially engaged in December 2023. On 28 September 2024, Sugiarto and Ardianto were married. Their wedding ceremony was held in Karanganyar Regency, Sugiarto's hometown.

== Achievements ==
=== World Junior Championships ===
Girls' doubles
| Year | Venue | Partner | Opponent | Score | Result |
|---|---|---|---|---|---|
| 2017 | GOR Among Rogo; Yogyakarta, Indonesia | (Indonesia) Jauza Fadhila Sugiarto | (South Korea) Baek Ha-na (South Korea) Lee Yu-rim | 21–18, 11–21, 3–21 | Silver |
| 2018 | Markham Pan Am Centre; Markham, Canada | (Indonesia) Febriana Dwipuji Kusuma | (Malaysia) Pearly Tan (Malaysia) Toh Ee Wei | 19–21, 19–21 | Bronze |

=== Asian Junior Championships ===
Girls' doubles
| Year | Venue | Partner | Opponent | Score | Result |
|---|---|---|---|---|---|
| 2017 | Jaya Raya Sports Hall Training Center; Jakarta, Indonesia | (Indonesia) Jauza Fadhila Sugiarto | (China) Liu Xuanxuan (China) Xia Yuting | 16–21, 17–21 | Bronze |
| 2018 | Jaya Raya Sports Hall Training Center; Jakarta, Indonesia | (Indonesia) Febriana Dwipuji Kusuma | (Malaysia) Pearly Tan (Malaysia) Toh Ee Wei | 21–12, 21–16 | Gold |

=== BWF World Tour (4 titles) ===
The BWF World Tour, which was announced on 19 March 2017 and implemented in 2018, is a series of elite badminton tournaments sanctioned by the Badminton World Federation (BWF). The BWF World Tour is divided into levels of World Tour Finals, Super 1000, Super 750, Super 500, Super 300 (part of the HSBC World Tour), and the BWF Tour Super 100.

Women's doubles
| Year | Tournament | Level | Partner | Opponent | Score | Result | Ref. |
|---|---|---|---|---|---|---|---|
| 2019 | Indonesia Masters | Super 100 | (Indonesia) Siti Fadia Silva Ramadhanti | (Indonesia) Della Destiara Haris (Indonesia) Rizki Amelia Pradipta | 23–21, 21–15 | (gold) Winner | |
| 2023 (I) | Indonesia Masters | Super 100 | (Indonesia) Lanny Tria Mayasari | (Chinese Taipei) Chang Ching-hui (Chinese Taipei) Yang Ching-tun | 22–20, 21–10 | (gold) Winner | |
| 2023 (II) | Indonesia Masters | Super 100 | (Indonesia) Lanny Tria Mayasari | (Indonesia) Meilysa Trias Puspita Sari (Indonesia) Rachel Allessya Rose | 21–12, 21–16 | (gold) Winner | |
| 2024 | Swiss Open | Super 300 | (Indonesia) Lanny Tria Mayasari | (Chinese Taipei) Hsu Ya-ching (Chinese Taipei) Lin Wan-ching | 13–21, 21–16, 21–8 | (gold) Winner | |

=== BWF International Challenge/Series (2 titles, 2 runners-up) ===
Women's doubles
| Year | Tournament | Partner | Opponent | Score | Result | Ref. |
|---|---|---|---|---|---|---|
| 2019 | Finnish Open | (Indonesia) Febriana Dwipuji Kusuma | (Japan) Erina Honda (Japan) Nozomi Shimizu | 15–21, 14–21 | (silver) Runner-up | |
| 2019 | Malaysia International | (Indonesia) Febriana Dwipuji Kusuma | (Malaysia) Pearly Tan (Malaysia) Thinaah Muralitharan | 16–21, 21–11, 18–21 | (silver) Runner-up | |
| 2022 (II) | Indonesia International | (Indonesia) Lanny Tria Mayasari | (Japan) Sayaka Hobara (Japan) Hinata Suzuki | 21–16, 21–18 | (gold) Winner | |
| 2022 | Bahrain International | (Indonesia) Lanny Tria Mayasari | (India) Treesa Jolly (India) Gayatri Gopichand | 21–18, 21–16 | (gold) Winner | |

BWF International Challenge tournament
BWF International Series tournament

=== BWF Junior International (3 titles, 2 runners-up) ===
Girls' doubles
| Year | Tournament | Partner | Opponent | Score | Result |
|---|---|---|---|---|---|
| 2016 | Malaysia Junior International | (Indonesia) Febriana Dwipuji Kusuma | (Malaysia) Thinaah Muralitharan (Malaysia) Sueh Jeou Tan | 11–7, 12–14, 4–11, 11–6, 11–9 | (gold) Winner |
| 2017 | Malaysia Junior International | (Indonesia) Jauza Fadhila Sugiarto | (Malaysia) Pearly Tan (Malaysia) Toh Ee Wei | 21–17, 21–18 | (gold) Winner |
| 2018 | India Junior International | (Indonesia) Febriana Dwipuji Kusuma | (Indonesia) Metya Inayah Cindiani (Indonesia) Febby Valencia Dwijayanti Gani | 19–21, 19–21 | (silver) Runner-up |
| 2018 | Malaysia Junior International | (Indonesia) Febriana Dwipuji Kusuma | (Malaysia) Pearly Tan (Malaysia) Toh Ee Wei | 13–21, 18–21 | (silver) Runner-up |

Mixed doubles
| Year | Tournament | Partner | Opponent | Score | Result |
|---|---|---|---|---|---|
| 2018 | India Junior International | (Indonesia) Pramudya Kusumawardana | (Indonesia) Leo Rolly Carnando (Indonesia) Metya Inayah Cindiani | 21–16, 21–12 | (gold) Winner |

BWF Junior International Grand Prix tournament
BWF Junior International Challenge tournament
BWF Junior International Series tournament
BWF Junior Future Series tournament

== Performance timeline ==
Key

| W | Won | F | Finalist | SF | Semi-finalist |
| QF | Quarter-finalist | #R | Rounds 4, 3, 2, 1 | RR | Round-robin stage |
| Q# | Qualification round | A | Absent | w/d | Withdrew |
| G | Gold | S | Silver | B | Bronze |
| NH | Not held | N/A | Not applicable | DNQ | Did not qualify |

=== National team ===
- Junior level

| Team events | 2017 | 2018 |
|---|---|---|
| Asian Junior Championships | S | B |
| World Junior Championships | QF | B |

- Senior level

| Team events | 2019 | 2020 | 2021 | 2022 | 2023 | 2024 | Ref |
|---|---|---|---|---|---|---|---|
| SEA Games | S | NH | S | NH | A | NH | |
| Asia Team Championships | NH | QF | NH | A | NH | B | |
| Asia Mixed Team Championships | A | NH | | | QF | NH | |
| Uber Cup | NH | QF | NH | A | NH | S | |
| Sudirman Cup | A | NH | QF | NH | QF | NH | |

=== Individual competitions ===
==== Junior level ====
Girls' doubles

| Event | 2017 | 2018 |
|---|---|---|
| Asian Junior Championships | B | G |
| World Junior Championships | S | B |

Mixed doubles

| Event | 2017 | 2018 |
|---|---|---|
| Asian Junior Championships | 3R | QF |
| World Junior Championships | A | QF |

==== Senior level ====
===== Women's doubles =====
| Event | 2019 | 2020 | 2021 | 2022 | 2023 | 2024 | Ref |
|---|---|---|---|---|---|---|---|
| SEA Games | QF | NH | QF | NH | A | NH | |
| Asian Championships | DNQ | NH | | QF | 1R | 1R | |
| World Championships | DNQ | NH | w/d | 2R | 2R | NH | |

| Tournament | BWF Superseries / Grand Prix | | BWF World Tour | | | | | | | Best | Ref |
| Tournament | 2016 | 2017 | 2018 | 2019 | 2020 | 2021 | 2022 | 2023 | 2024 | Best | Ref |
|---|---|---|---|---|---|---|---|---|---|---|---|
| Malaysia Open | A | | | | NH | | QF | A | | QF ('22) | |
| Indonesia Masters | A | NH | 2R | 1R | 1R | 1R | QF | 2R | SF | SF ('24) | |
| Thailand Masters | A | | | 2R | A | NH | | QF | 2R | QF ('23) | |
| French Open | A | | | | NH | QF | A | | | QF ('21) | |
| All England Open | A | | | | 2R | A | | | | 2R ('20) | |
| Orléans Masters | N/A | | 2R | A | NH | w/d | A | SF | QF | SF ('23) | |
| Swiss Open | A | | | | NH | A | | 1R | W | W ('24) | |
| Ruichang China Masters | N/A | | A | 2R | NH | | | A | | 2R ('19) | |
| Spain Masters | NH | | A | | | | NH | 1R | A | 1R ('23) | |
| Thailand Open | A | | | 1R | 1R | NH | A | 2R | Ret. | 2R ('23) | |
| Thailand Open | A | | | 1R | 1R | NH | A | 2R | Ret. | 2R ('23) | |
| Malaysia Masters | A | | | Q2 | 1R | NH | 2R | 1R | Ret. | 2R ('22) | |
| Singapore Open | A | | | | NH | | A | 1R | Ret. | 1R ('23) | |
| Indonesia Open | 1R | Q2 | A | | NH | w/d | 1R | 1R | Ret. | 1R ('16, '22, '23) | |
| Australian Open | A | | | | NH | | 2R | A | Ret. | 2R ('22) | |
| Taipei Open | A | | 2R | SF | NH | | A | w/d | Ret. | SF ('19) | |
| Vietnam Open | A | | | 1R | NH | | 2R | A | Ret. | 2R ('22) | |
| Indonesia Masters Super 100 | NH | | SF | W | NH | | QF | W | Ret. | W ('19, '23^{I}, '23^{II}) | |
| Indonesia Masters Super 100 | NH | | SF | W | NH | | QF | W | Ret. | W ('19, '23^{I}, '23^{II}) | |
| Denmark Open | A | | | | | 1R | A | | Ret. | 1R ('21) | |
| Hylo Open | A | | | | | SF | A | | Ret. | SF ('21) | |
| Hong Kong Open | A | | | 1R | NH | | | A | Ret. | 1R ('19) | |
| Macau Open | A | | | QF | NH | | | | Ret. | QF ('19) | |
| Hyderabad Open | NH | | 2R | 2R | NH | | | | Ret. | 2R ('18, '19) | |
| Russian Open | A | | | QF | NH | | | | Ret. | QF ('19) | |
| Year-end ranking | 159 | 217 | 80 | 53 | 32 | 28 | 74 | 30 | 52 | 25 | |
| Tournament | 2016 | 2017 | 2018 | 2019 | 2020 | 2021 | 2022 | 2023 | 2024 | Best | Ref |

===== Mixed doubles =====
| Tournament | BWF World Tour | Best |
| Tournament | 2018 | Best |
|---|---|---|
| Orléans Masters | 1R | 1R ('18) |
| Indonesia Masters Super 100 | 2R | 2R ('18) |
| Year-end ranking | 239 | 229 |
