= 2017 BWF World Junior Championships – Teams event =

2017 BWF World Junior Championships Teams event
Tournament details
- Dates: 9–14 October
- Edition: 19th
- Level: International
- Nations: 44
- Venue: Among Rogo Sports Hall
- Location: Yogyakarta, Indonesia

The teams event of the 2017 BWF World Junior Championships was held on 9–14 October. The event also known as the 2017 Suhandinata Cup. The defending champions were China, who defeated Malaysia in the previous edition. The group draw was done at the Hotel Indonesia Kempinski, Jakarta, on 28 September. China were drawn with Chinese Taipei, Denmark, Algeria, and Hong Kong in group G. Indonesia as the host were drawn with Mongolia and Brazil in group H1.

China won the cup after defeating Malaysia 3–1 in the final.

== Group stage ==
=== Group A ===
==== Group A1 ====
Pos	Team	Pld	W	L	MW	ML	GW	GL	PW	PL	Pts	Qualification
1	South Korea [1]	2	2	0	9	1	18	4	440	324	4	Play-off A1
2	Canada	2	1	1	5	5	13	11	427	419	2	Play-off A2
3	Sri Lanka	2	0	2	1	9	3	19	325	449	0	Play-off A3

==== Group A2 ====
Pos	Team	Pld	W	L	MW	ML	GW	GL	PW	PL	Pts	Qualification
1	Russia [9/16]	2	2	0	9	1	19	2	435	283	4	Play-off A1
2	Germany	2	1	1	6	4	12	9	390	326	2	Play-off A2
3	Nepal	2	0	2	0	10	0	20	204	420	0	Play-off A3

==== Group A play-offs ====
Play-off A1
South Korea	3
Russia	1

Play-off A2
Canada	3
Germany	2

Play-off A3
Sri Lanka	3
Nepal	0

=== Group B ===
==== Group B1 ====
Pos	Team	Pld	W	L	MW	ML	GW	GL	PW	PL	Pts	Qualification
1	France [5/8]	2	2	0	8	2	18	4	436	312	4	Play-off B1
2	Scotland	2	1	1	4	6	8	13	352	364	2	Play-off B2
3	Bulgaria	2	0	2	3	7	6	15	296	408	0	Play-off B3

==== Group B2 ====
Pos	Team	Pld	W	L	MW	ML	GW	GL	PW	PL	Pts	Qualification
1	Singapore [9/16]	2	2	0	10	0	20	0	420	196	4	Play-off B1
2	South Africa	2	1	1	3	7	6	14	313	381	2	Play-off B2
3	Ghana	2	0	2	2	8	4	16	238	394	0	Play-off B3

==== Group B play-offs ====
Play-off B1
France	3
Singapore	1

Play-off B2
Scotland	3
South Africa	0

Play-off B3
Bulgaria	3
Ghana	0

=== Group C ===
==== Group C1 ====
Pos	Team	Pld	W	L	MW	ML	GW	GL	PW	PL	Pts	Qualification
1	Malaysia [3/4]	2	2	0	10	0	20	0	420	153	4	Play-off C1
2	New Zealand	2	1	1	5	5	10	10	330	287	2	Play-off C2
3	Armenia	2	0	2	0	10	0	20	110	420	0	Play-off C3

==== Group C2 ====
Pos	Team	Pld	W	L	MW	ML	GW	GL	PW	PL	Pts	Qualification
1	Poland [9/16]	2	2	0	9	1	18	3	426	272	4	Play-off C1
2	Norway	2	1	1	6	4	13	8	379	320	2	Play-off C2
3	Egypt	2	0	2	0	10	0	20	207	420	0	Play-off C3

==== Group C play-offs ====
Play-off C1
Malaysia	3
Poland	0

Play-off C2
New Zealand	3
Norway	0

Play-off C3
Armenia	0
Egypt	3

=== Group D ===
Pos	Team	Pld	W	L	MW	ML	GW	GL	PW	PL	Pts	Qualification
1	India [5/8]	4	4	0	18	2	37	6	893	598	8	Final Stage 1st to 8th
2	Sweden [9/16]	4	2	2	11	9	26	21	892	842	4	Final Stage 9th to 16th
3	United States	4	2	2	10	10	23	21	835	803	4	Final Stage 17th to 24th
4	Hungary	4	2	2	8	12	16	27	663	790	4	Final Stage 25th to 32nd
5	Australia	4	0	4	3	17	8	35	620	870	0	Final Stage 33rd to 40th

=== Group E ===
Pos	Team	Pld	W	L	MW	ML	GW	GL	PW	PL	Pts	Qualification
1	Japan [5/8]	4	4	0	19	1	39	3	859	390	8	Final Stage 1st to 8th
2	England [9/16]	4	3	1	14	6	31	14	862	581	6	Final Stage 9th to 16th
3	Macau	4	2	2	9	11	19	23	622	681	4	Final Stage 17th to 24th
4	Latvia	4	1	2	8	12	17	28	648	797	2	Final Stage 25th to 32nd
5	Georgia	4	0	4	0	20	2	40	334	876	0	Final Stage 33rd to 40th

=== Group F ===
==== Group F1 ====
Pos	Team	Pld	W	L	MW	ML	GW	GL	PW	PL	Pts	Qualification
1	Thailand [3/4]	2	2	0	9	1	19	2	427	292	4	Play-off F1
2	Philippines	2	1	1	4	6	8	13	354	408	2	Play-off F2
3	Netherlands	2	0	2	2	8	5	17	351	431	0	Play-off F3

==== Group F2 ====
Pos	Team	Pld	W	L	MW	ML	GW	GL	PW	PL	Pts	Qualification
1	Belgium	2	2	0	6	4	15	8	438	395	4	Play-off F1
2	Slovakia	2	1	1	5	5	11	13	425	456	2	Play-off F2
3	Czech Republic [9/16]	2	1	1	4	6	9	14	426	438	0	Play-off F3

==== Group F play-offs ====
Play-off F1
Thailand	3
Belgium	0

Play-off F2
Philippines	3
Slovakia	0

Play-off F3
Netherlands	3
Czech Republic	0

=== Group G ===
Pos	Team	Pld	W	L	MW	ML	GW	GL	PW	PL	Pts	Qualification
1	China [9/16]	3	3	0	14	1	28	4	657	451	6	Final Stage 1st to 8th
2	Chinese Taipei [5/8]	3	2	1	9	6	19	14	615	566	4	Final Stage 9th to 16th
3	Denmark	3	1	2	6	9	14	21	613	673	2	Final Stage 17th to 24th
4	Hong Kong	3	0	3	1	14	7	29	541	736	0	Final Stage 25th to 32nd
5	Algeria	0	0	0	0	0	0	0	0	0	0	Withdrew

=== Group H ===
==== Group H1 ====
Pos	Team	Pld	W	L	MW	ML	GW	GL	PW	PL	Pts	Qualification
1	Indonesia [2]	2	2	0	10	0	20	0	420	170	4	Play-off H1
2	Brazil	2	1	1	5	5	10	10	329	267	2	Play-off H2
3	Mongolia	2	0	2	0	10	0	20	108	420	0	Play-off H3

==== Group H2 ====
Pos	Team	Pld	W	L	MW	ML	GW	GL	PW	PL	Pts	Qualification
1	Spain	2	2	0	8	2	18	4	436	293	4	Play-off H1
2	Finland [9/16]	2	1	1	5	5	11	11	384	375	2	Play-off H2
3	El Salvador	2	0	2	2	8	4	18	274	426	0	Play-off H3

==== Group H play-offs ====
Play-off H1
Indonesia	3
Spain	0

Play-off H2
Brazil	3
Finland	0

Play-off H3
Mongolia	1
El Salvador	3

== Final stage ==
=== 1st to 8th ===
5th–6th place match
D	India	1
H	Indonesia	3
7th–8th place match
B	France	0
F	Thailand	3

5th to 8th semifinals
B	France	0
D	India	3
F	Thailand	1
H	Indonesia	3

1st to 8th quarterfinals
A	South Korea	3
B	France	2
C	Malaysia	3
D	India	0
E	Japan	3
F	Thailand	2
G	China	3
H	Indonesia	1

1st to 4th semifinals
A	South Korea	0
C	Malaysia	3
E	Japan	1
G	China	3

Final
C	Malaysia	1
G	China	3
Third place
A	South Korea	np
E	Japan

==== 1st to 8th quarterfinals ====
South Korea
3
GOR Among Rogo, Court 5
12 October 2017
08:30 UTC+7

France
2

			1	2	3
1	(South Korea) (France)	Jeong-min / Ki Dong-ju; Thom Gicquel / Vimala Hériau	11; 21	8; 21
2	(South Korea) (France)	Kim Seong-jae; Arnaud Merklé	10; 21	3; 21
3	(South Korea) (France)	An Se-young; Léonice Huet	21; 15	21; 15
4	(South Korea) (France)	Ki Dong-ju / Kim Seong-jae; Thom Gicquel / Léo Rossi	21; 15	19; 21	21; 19
5	(South Korea) (France)	An Se-young / Jeong-min; Vimala Hériau / Léonice Huet	21; 16	16; 21	21; 15

Malaysia
3
GOR Among Rogo, Court 6
12 October 2017
08:30 UTC+7

India
0

			1	2	3
1	(Malaysia) (India)	Ng Eng Cheong / Tan Sueh Jeou; Dhruv Kapila / Mithula U.K.	21; 18	21; 10
2	(Malaysia) (India)	Leong Jun Hao; Lakshya Sen	21; 13	21; 15
3	(Malaysia) (India)	Goh Jin Wei; Ashmita Chaliha	21; 12	21; 12
4	(Malaysia) (India)	Chang Yee Jun / Man Wei Chong; Krishna Prasad Garaga / Dhruv Kapila				not played
5	(Malaysia) (India)	Pearly Tan Koong Le / Toh Ee Wei; Rutuparna Panda / Mithula U.K.				not played

Japan
3
GOR Among Rogo, Court 7
12 October 2017
08:30 UTC+7

Thailand
2

			1	2	3
1	(Japan) (Thailand)	Takuma Obayashi / Natsu Saito; Pacharapol Nipornram / Chasinee Korepap	21; 14	18; 21	21; 17
2	(Japan) (Thailand)	Kodai Naraoka; Kunlavut Vitidsarn	12; 21	17; 21
3	(Japan) (Thailand)	Mahiro Kaneko / Yunosuke Kubota; Pacharapol Nipornram / Natthapat Trinkajee	10; 21	21; 9	21; 12
4	(Japan) (Thailand)	Hirari Mizui; Pattarasuda Chaiwan	17; 21	17; 21
5	(Japan) (Thailand)	Rin Iwanaga / Natsu Saito; Supisara Paewsampran / Kwanchanok Sudjaipraparat	17; 21	21; 11	21; 14

China
3
GOR Among Rogo, Court 1
12 October 2017
08:30 UTC+7

Indonesia
1

			1	2	3
1	(China) (Indonesia)	Fan Qiuyue / Wang Chang; Muhammad Shohibul Fikri / Adnan Maulana	13; 21	21; 18	21; 15
2	(China) (Indonesia)	Han Yue; Gregoria Mariska Tunjung	17; 21	17; 21
3	(China) (Indonesia)	Bai Yupeng; Gatjra Piliang Fiqihilahi Cupu	16; 21	21; 15	21; 13
4	(China) (Indonesia)	Liu Xuanxuan / Xia Yuting; Jauza Fadhila Sugiarto / Ribka Sugiarto	21; 9	21; 15
5	(China) (Indonesia)	Fan Qiuyue / Li Wenmei; Rinov Rivaldy / Siti Fadia Silva Ramadhanti				not played

==== 5th to 8th semifinals ====
France
0
GOR Among Rogo, Court 3
12 October 2017
19:00 UTC+7

India
3

			1	2	3
1	(France) (India)	Eloi Adam / Juliette Moinard; Dhruv Kapila / Rutaparna Panda	22; 20	18; 21	22; 24
2	(France) (India)	Christo Popov; Lakshya Sen	22; 20	13; 21	9; 21
3	(France) (India)	Margot Lambert; Aakarshi Kashyap	13; 21	13; 21
4	(France) (India)	Eloi Adam / Samy Corvee; Krishna Prasad Garaga / Dhruv Kapila				not played
5	(France) (India)	Margot Lambert / Juliette Moinard; Rutaparna Panda / Mithula U.K.				not played

Thailand
1
GOR Among Rogo, Court 4
12 October 2017
19:00 UTC+7

Indonesia
3

			1	2	3
1	(Thailand) (Indonesia)	Weeraphat Phakjarung / Panthorn Saengvanich; Rehan Naufal Kusharjanto / Rinov Rivaldy	11; 21	15; 21
2	(Thailand) (Indonesia)	Nuntakarn Aimsaard; Aurum Oktavia Winata	22; 20	21; 12
3	(Thailand) (Indonesia)	Ruttanapak Oupthong; Ikhsan Rumbay	18; 21	16; 21
4	(Thailand) (Indonesia)	Thanapim Kaweenuntavong / Suphapich Silprakob; Agatha Imanuela / Siti Fadia Silva Ramadhanti	15; 21	21; 23
5	(Thailand) (Indonesia)	Wachirawit Sothon / Chasinee Korepap; Yeremia Rambitan / Angelica Wiratama				not played

==== 1st to 4th semifinals ====
South Korea
0
GOR Among Rogo, Court 7
13 October 2017
13:00 UTC+7

Malaysia
3

			1	2	3
1	(South Korea) (Malaysia)	Jeong-min / Kim Seong-jae; Ng Eng Cheong / Tan Sueh Jeou	9; 21	12; 21
2	(South Korea) (Malaysia)	Ki Dong-ju; Leong Jun Hao	6; 21	19; 21
3	(South Korea) (Malaysia)	An Se-young; Goh Jin Wei	16; 21	19; 21
4	(South Korea) (Malaysia)	Kim Seong-jae / Ki Dong-ju; Man Wei Chong / Chang Yee Jun				not played
5	(South Korea) (Malaysia)	Jeong-min / An Se-young; Toh Ee Wei / Pearly Tan Koong Le				not played

Japan
1
GOR Among Rogo, Court 1
13 October 2017
13:00 UTC+7

China
3

			1	2	3
1	(Japan) (China)	Takuma Obayashi / Natsu Saito; Fan Qiuyue / Li Wenmei	13; 21	13; 21
2	(Japan) (China)	Kadai Naraoka; Bai Yupeng	21; 13	21; 8
3	(Japan) (China)	Mahiro Kaneko / Yunosoke Kubota; Fan Qiuyue / Wang Chang	15; 21	12; 21
4	(Japan) (China)	Moto Hayashi; Han Yue	11; 21	12; 21
5	(Japan) (China)	Rin Iwanaga / Natsu Saito; Liu Xuanxuan / Xia Yuting				not played

==== 7th–8th place match ====
France
0
GOR Among Rogo, Court 6
13 October 2017
19:00 UTC+7

Thailand
3

			1	2	3
1	(France) (Thailand)	Eloi Adam / Samy Corvee; Wachirawit Sothon / Natthapat Trinkajee	21; 17	15; 21	14; 21
2	(France) (Thailand)	Léonice Huet; Chasinee Korepap	14; 21	11; 21
3	(France) (Thailand)	Léo Rossi; Ruttanapak Oupthong	19; 21	28; 21
4	(France) (Thailand)	Margot Lambert / Juliette Moinard; Supisara Paewsampran / Kwanchanok Sudjaipraparat				not played
5	(France) (Thailand)	Thom Gicquel / Vimala Heriau; Weeraphat Phakjarung /Thanapim Kaweenuntavong				not played

==== 5th–6th place match ====
India
1
GOR Among Rogo, Court 7
13 October 2017
19:00 UTC+7

Indonesia
3

			1	2	3
1	(India) (Indonesia)	Dhruv Kapila / Rituparna Panda; Rinov Rivaldy / Siti Fadia Silva Ramadhanti	11; 21	6; 21
2	(India) (Indonesia)	Kartikey Gulshan Kumar; Ikhsan Rumbay	16; 21	20; 22
3	(India) (Indonesia)	Krishna Prasad Garaga / Dhruv Kapila; Muhammad Shohibul Fikri / Adnan Maulana	24; 22	23; 21
4	(India) (Indonesia)	Aakarshi Kashyap; Gregoria Mariska Tunjung	14; 21	11; 21
5	(India) (Indonesia)	Rutaparna Panda / Mithula U.K. Agatha Imanuela / Siti Fadia Silva Ramadhanti				not played

==== Final ====
Malaysia
1
GOR Among Rogo, Court 1
14 October 2017
13:00 UTC+7

China
3

			1	2	3
1	(Malaysia) (China)	Man Wei Chong / Pearly Tan Koong Le; Fan Qiuyue / Li Wenmei	21; 12	9; 21	21; 17
2	(Malaysia) (China)	Leong Jun Hao; Gao Zhengze	14; 21	18; 21
3	(Malaysia) (China)	Chang Yee Jun / Ng Eng Cheong; Fan Qiuyue / Wang Chang	19; 21	17; 21
4	(Malaysia) (China)	Goh Jin Wei; Han Yue	16; 21	22; 20	8; 21
5	(Malaysia) (China)	Tan Sueh Jeou / Toh Ee Wei; Li Wenmei / Liu Xuanxuan				not played

=== 9th to 16th ===
13th–14th place match
A	Russia	2
H	Spain	3
15th–16th place match
C	Poland	3
F	Belgium	2

13th to 16th semifinals
A	Russia	3
C	Poland	0
F	Belgium	1
H	Spain	3

9th to 16th quarterfinals
A	Russia	1
B	Singapore	3
C	Poland	0
D	Sweden	3
E	England	3
F	Belgium	0
G	Chinese Taipei	3
H	Spain	1

9th to 12th semifinals
B	Singapore	1
D	Sweden	3
E	England	3
G	Chinese Taipei	2

9th–10th place match
D	Sweden	1
E	England	3
11th–12th place match
B	Singapore	0
G	Chinese Taipei	3

=== 17th to 24th ===
21st–22nd place match
D	United States	0
H	Brazil	3
23rd–24th place match
B	Scotland	3
E	Macau	1

21st to 24th semifinals
B	Scotland	2
D	United States	3
E	Macau	0
H	Brazil	3

17th to 24th quarterfinals
A	Canada	3
B	Scotland	1
C	New Zealand	3
D	United States	1
E	Macau	0
F	Philippines	3
G	Denmark	3
H	Brazil	2

17th to 20th semifinals
A	Canada	3
C	New Zealand	0
F	Philippines	0
G	Denmark	3

17th–18th place match
A	Canada	1
G	Denmark	3
19th–20th place match
C	New Zealand	1
F	Philippines	3

=== 25th to 32nd ===
29th–30th place match
C	Norway	2
H	Finland	3
31st–32nd place match
B	South Africa	3
E	Latvia	2

29th to 32nd semifinals
B	South Africa	0
C	Norway	3
E	Latvia	0
H	Finland	3

25th to 32nd quarterfinals
A	Germany	3
B	South Africa	0
C	Norway	0
D	Hungary	3
E	Latvia	0
F	Slovakia	3
G	Hong Kong	3
H	Finland	0

25th to 28th semifinals
A	Germany	3
D	Hungary	2
F	Slovakia	0
G	Hong Kong	3

25th–26th place match
A	Germany	1
G	Hong Kong	3
27th–28th place match
D	Hungary	3
F	Slovakia	1

=== 33rd to 40th ===
37th–38th place match
A	Sri Lanka	3
H	El Salvador	0
39th–40th place match
C	Egypt	3
E	Georgia	0

37th to 40th semifinals
A	Sri Lanka	3
C	Egypt	0
E	Georgia	1
H	El Salvador	3

33rd to 40th quarterfinals
A	Sri Lanka	1
B	Bulgaria	3
C	Egypt	0
D	Australia	3
E	Georgia	0
F	Netherlands	3
B	Ghana	3
H	El Salvador	1

33rd to 36th semifinals
B	Bulgaria	3
D	Australia	2
F	Netherlands	3
B	Ghana	0

33rd–34th place match
B	Bulgaria	1
F	Netherlands	3
35th–36th place match
D	Australia	3
B	Ghana	0

=== 41st to 44th ===
Pos	Team	Pld	W	L	MW	ML	GW	GL	PW	PL	Pts	Final ranking
1	Czech Republic	3	3	0	15	0	28	1	608	261	6	41st place
2	Nepal	3	2	1	10	5	20	11	562	436	4	42nd place
3	Mongolia	3	1	2	3	12	8	23	383	591	2	43rd place
4	Armenia	3	0	3	2	13	5	26	340	605	0	44th place

== Final standings ==
1. China
2. Malaysia
3. South Korea
3. Japan
5. Indonesia
6. India
7. Thailand
8. France
9. England
10. Sweden
11. Chinese Taipei
12. Singapore
13. Spain
14. Russia
15. Poland
16. Belgium
17. Denmark
18. Canada
19. Philippines
20. New Zealand
21. Brazil (Debut)
22. United States
23. Scotland
24. Macau
25. Hong Kong
26. Germany
27. Hungary
28. Slovakia
29. Finland
30. Norway
31. South Africa
32. Latvia
33. Netherlands
34. Bulgaria
35. Australia
36. Ghana (Debut)
37. Sri Lanka
38. El Salvador
39. Egypt
40. Georgia
41. Czech Republic
42. Nepal (Debut)
43. Mongolia
44. Armenia
