= Xia Yuting =

Chinese badminton player (born 2000)

Xia Yuting 夏玉婷
Personal information
- Born: 29 May 2000 (age 26) Jiangsu, China
- Years active: 2016–present
- Height: 1.72 m (5 ft 8 in)

Sport
- Country: China
- Sport: Badminton
- Handedness: Right

Women's & mixed doubles
- Highest ranking: 16 (WD 12 November 2019); 232 (XD 5 April 2018)
- BWF profile
Medal record
Women's badminton
Representing China
Uber Cup
Gold medal – first place	2020 Aarhus	Women's team
World University Games
Silver medal – second place	2021 Chengdu	Women's doubles
Silver medal – second place	2021 Chengdu	Mixed team
World Junior Championships
Gold medal – first place	2017 Yogyakarta	Mixed team
Gold medal – first place	2018 Markham	Girls' doubles
Gold medal – first place	2018 Markham	Mixed team
Bronze medal – third place	2017 Yogyakarta	Girls' doubles
Asian Junior Championships
Gold medal – first place	2018 Jakarta	Mixed team
Silver medal – second place	2017 Jakarta	Girls' doubles
Bronze medal – third place	2018 Jakarta	Girls' doubles

Xia Yuting (Chinese: 夏玉婷; pinyin: Xià Yùtíng; born 29 May 2000) is a Chinese badminton player from Jiangsu. She was part of the national junior team that won the mixed team title at the 2017 and 2018 World Junior Championships and also at the 2018 Asian Junior Championships. In the individual junior event, she was the girls' doubles champion at the 2018 World Junior Championships partnered with Liu Xuanxuan.

== Achievements ==
=== World University Games ===
Women's doubles
Year	Venue	Partner	Opponent	Score	Result	Ref.
2021	Shuangliu Sports Centre Gymnasium; Chengdu, China	(China) Du Yue	(China) Li Wenmei (China) Liu Xuanxuan	21–18, 19–21, 14–21	Silver	

=== World Junior Championships ===
Girls' doubles
Year	Venue	Partner	Opponent	Score	Result
2017	Among Rogo Sports Hall; Yogyakarta, Indonesia	(China) Zhang Shuxian	(Indonesia) Jauza Fadhila Sugiarto (Indonesia) Ribka Sugiarto	17–21, 21–19, 11–21	Bronze
2018	Markham Pan Am Centre; Markham, Canada	(China) Liu Xuanxuan	(Malaysia) Pearly Tan (Malaysia) Toh Ee Wei	21–16, 21–16	Gold

=== Asian Junior Championships ===
Girls' doubles
Year	Venue	Partner	Opponent	Score	Result
2017	Jaya Raya Sports Hall Training Center; Jakarta, Indonesia	(China) Liu Xuanxuan	(South Korea) Baek Ha-na (South Korea) Lee Yu-rim	12–21, 19–21	Silver
2018	Jaya Raya Sports Hall Training Center; Jakarta, Indonesia	(China) Liu Xuanxuan	(Indonesia) Febriana Dwipuji Kusuma (Indonesia) Ribka Sugiarto	23–25, 21–14, 15–21	Bronze

=== BWF World Tour (1 title, 1 runner-up) ===
The BWF World Tour, which was announced on 19 March 2017 and implemented in 2018, is a series of elite badminton tournaments sanctioned by the Badminton World Federation (BWF). The BWF World Tour is divided into levels of World Tour Finals, Super 1000, Super 750, Super 500, Super 300 (part of the HSBC World Tour), and the BWF Tour Super 100.

Women's doubles
Year	Tournament	Level	Partner	Opponent	Score	Result
2019	Lingshui China Masters	Super 100	(China) Liu Xuanxuan	(South Korea) Baek Ha-na (South Korea) Kim Hye-rin	14–21, 21–14, 15–21	(silver) Runner-up
2019	SaarLorLux Open	Super 100	(China) Liu Xuanxuan	(England) Chloe Birch (England) Lauren Smith	21–16, 21–13	(gold) Winner

=== BWF International Challenge/Series (2 titles) ===
Women's doubles
Year	Tournament	Partner	Opponent	Score	Result
2019	Austrian Open	(China) Liu Xuanxuan	(Russia) Anastasiia Akchurina (Russia) Olga Morozova	21–17, 21–15	(gold) Winner
2023	China International	(China) Zhou Xinru	(China) Keng Shuliang (China) Zhang Chi	21–15, 21–15	(gold) Winner

BWF International Challenge tournament
BWF International Series tournament
