= Febby Valencia Dwijayanti Gani =

Indonesian badminton player (born 2000)

Personal information
- Born: 11 February 2000 (age 26) Semarang, Central Java, Indonesia
- Height: 1.73 m (5 ft 8 in)

Sport
- Country: Indonesia
- Sport: Badminton
- Handedness: Right

Women's doubles
- Highest ranking: 127 (WD with Yulfira Barkah 25 May 2021); 60 (WD with Ribka Sugiarto 3 January 2023)
- Current ranking: 60 (WD with Ribka Sugiarto 10 January 2023)
- BWF profile
Medal record
Women's badminton
Representing Indonesia
SEA Games
Silver medal – second place	2021 Vietnam	Women's team

Febby Valencia Dwijayanti Gani (born 11 February 2000) is an Indonesian badminton player from Semarang, who affiliate with Djarum club. She won the girls' doubles title at the 2017 Indonesian National Junior Championships.

== Career ==
Gani is a member of Djarum badminton club, and has joined the club since 2016. She won the National circuit tournaments at the 2017 North Sulawesi, Central Java, and East Java Opens in the girls' doubles cadets events partnered with Lisa Ayu Kusumawati. She and Kusumawati then closed the 2017 circuits by winning the Indonesian National Junior Championships. For her achievements in 2017, Gani was selected to join the National training camp in 2018.

In 2018, Gani won the Junior Grand Prix event in India. Partnered with Metya Inayah Cindiani, the duo defeated the 2018 Asian Junior Champion, Febriana Dwipuji Kusuma and Ribka Sugiarto in straight games.

In 2021, Gani won her first World Tour title at the 2021 Spain Masters together with Yulfira Barkah, beating the top seeds from Denmark, Amalie Magelund and Freja Ravn. In September 2022, Gani left the Indonesian national badminton training centre (Pelatnas PBSI), a decision confirmed by women's doubles coach Eng Hian as the federation reorganised its women's doubles partnerships.

== Achievements ==
=== BWF World Tour (1 title) ===
The BWF World Tour, which was announced on 19 March 2017 and implemented in 2018, is a series of elite badminton tournaments sanctioned by the Badminton World Federation (BWF). The BWF World Tour is divided into levels of World Tour Finals, Super 1000, Super 750, Super 500, Super 300 (part of the HSBC World Tour), and the BWF Tour Super 100.

Women's doubles
Year	Tournament	Level	Partner	Opponent	Score	Result	Ref.
2021	Spain Masters	Super 300	(Indonesia) Yulfira Barkah	(Denmark) Amalie Magelund (Denmark) Freja Ravn	21–16, 21–14	(gold) Winner	

=== BWF International Challenge/Series (1 runner-up) ===
Women's doubles
Year	Tournament	Partner	Opponent	Score	Result
2021	Czech Open	(Indonesia) Jesita Putri Miantoro	(Malaysia) Anna Cheong (Malaysia) Teoh Mei Xing	15–21, 21–16, 17–21	(silver) Runner-up

BWF International Challenge tournament
BWF International Series tournament
BWF Future Series tournament

=== BWF Junior International (1 title) ===
Girls' doubles
Year	Tournament	Partner	Opponent	Score	Result
2018	India Junior International	(Indonesia) Metya Inayah Cindiani	(Indonesia) Febriana Dwipuji Kusuma (Indonesia) Ribka Sugiarto	21–19, 21–19	(gold) Winner

BWF Junior International Grand Prix tournament
BWF Junior International Challenge tournament
BWF Junior International Series tournament
BWF Junior Future Series tournament

== Performance timeline ==
Key

W	Won	F	Finalist	SF	Semi-finalist
QF	Quarter-finalist	#R	Rounds 4, 3, 2, 1	RR	Round-robin stage
Q#	Qualification round	A	Absent	w/d	Withdrew
G	Gold	S	Silver	B	Bronze
NH	Not held	N/A	Not applicable	DNQ	Did not qualify

=== National team ===
- Senior level

Team events	2020	2021
Uber Cup	QF	NH
SEA Games	NH	S

=== Individual competitions ===
- Junior level

Event	2018
Asian Junior Championships	QF

- Senior level

Team events	2021
SEA Games	QF

Tournament	BWF Superseries / Grand Prix		BWF World Tour					Best	Ref
Tournament	2016	2017	2018	2019	2020	2021	2022	Best	Ref
Spain Masters	NH		A			W	NH	W ('21)	
Orléans Masters	N/A		A		NH	2R	A	2R ('21)	
Indonesia Masters	A	NH	1R	A		w/d	QF	QF ('22)	
Indonesia Open	1R	Q1	A		NH	w/d	1R	1R ('16, '22)	
Malaysia Open	A				NH		QF	QF ('22)	
Malaysia Masters	A					NH	2R	2R ('22)	
Taipei Open	A				NH		w/d		
Indonesia Masters Super 100	N/A		1R	A	NH		A	1R ('18)	
Year-end ranking	256	323	316	274	308	157	62	60	
2016	2017	2018	2019	2020	2021	2022	Best	Ref	
