= 2018 Badminton Asia Junior Championships =

Tournament details
- Dates: 14–22 July 2018
- Edition: 21
- Level: International
- Venue: Jaya Raya Sports Hall Training Center
- Location: South Tangerang, Indonesia

The 2018 Badminton Asia Junior Championships is the 21st edition of the Asia continental junior championships to crown the best U-19 badminton players across Asia. This tournament was held in Bintaro, South Tangerang, Indonesia, between 14 and 22 July 2018.

== Tournament ==
The 2018 Badminton Asia Junior Championships was organized by the Badminton Association of Indonesia, sanctioned by Badminton Asia. This tournament consists of team and individual events. There were 14 teams competing in the mixed team event, which was held from 14–17 July, while the individual events were held from 18–22 July. There were 244 athletes from 18 countries across Asia competing in this tournament.

=== Venue ===
This international tournament was held at Jaya Raya Sport Hall Training Center in South Tangerang, Indonesia.

== Medalists ==
=== Events ===
Event	Gold	Silver	Bronze
Teams	China; Bai Yupeng; Di Zijian; Guo Ruohan; Guo Xinwa; Li Shifeng; Liang Weikeng; Shang Yichen; Wang Chang; Chen Yingying; Li Yijing; Liu Xuanxuan; Wang Zhiyi; Wei Yaxin; Xia Yuting; Zhang Shuxian; Zhou Meng	Japan; Riku Hatano; Ryota Ichii; Motoya Ikebata; Taiki Kato; Takuma Kawamoto; Hiroki Midorikawa; Hiroki Nakayama; Yuta Takei; Shiena Fukumoto; Riko Gunji; Akari Kurihara; Hirari Mizui; Natsu Saito; Chihiro Uchiyama; An Uesugi; Rumi Yoshida	Indonesia; Leo Rolly Carnando; Karono; Rehan Naufal Kusharjanto; Daniel Marthin; Ghifari Anandaffa Prihardika; Pramudya Kusumawardana; Ikhsan Rumbay; Alberto Alvin Yulianto; Agatha Imanuela; Febriana Dwipuji Kusuma; Lisa Ayu Kusumawati; Siti Fadia Silva Ramadhanti; Stephanie Widjaja; Ribka Sugiarto; Putri Syaikah; Putri Kusuma Wardani
Teams	China; Bai Yupeng; Di Zijian; Guo Ruohan; Guo Xinwa; Li Shifeng; Liang Weikeng; Shang Yichen; Wang Chang; Chen Yingying; Li Yijing; Liu Xuanxuan; Wang Zhiyi; Wei Yaxin; Xia Yuting; Zhang Shuxian; Zhou Meng	Japan; Riku Hatano; Ryota Ichii; Motoya Ikebata; Taiki Kato; Takuma Kawamoto; Hiroki Midorikawa; Hiroki Nakayama; Yuta Takei; Shiena Fukumoto; Riko Gunji; Akari Kurihara; Hirari Mizui; Natsu Saito; Chihiro Uchiyama; An Uesugi; Rumi Yoshida	Malaysia; Chang Yee Jun; Chia Wei Jie; Choong Hon Jian; Chua Yue Chern; Lim Chong King; Lwi Sheng Hao; Ng Tze Yong; Ooi Jhy Dar; Letshanaa Karupathevan; Eng Sin Jou; Eoon Qi Xuan; Go Pei Kee; Pearly Tan Koong Le; Teoh Le Xuan; Toh Ee Wei; Yap Ling
Boys' singles	(India) Lakshya Sen	(Thailand) Kunlavut Vitidsarn	(China) Bai Yupeng
Boys' singles	(India) Lakshya Sen	(Thailand) Kunlavut Vitidsarn	(Indonesia) Ikhsan Rumbay
Girls' singles	(China) Wang Zhiyi	(China) Zhou Meng	(Japan) Hirari Mizui
Girls' singles	(China) Wang Zhiyi	(China) Zhou Meng	(China) Wei Yaxin
Boys' doubles	(China) Di Zijian (China) Wang Chang	(China) Liang Weikeng (China) Shang Yichen	(Indonesia) Ghifari Anandaffa Prihardika (Indonesia) Pramudya Kusumawardana
Boys' doubles	(China) Di Zijian (China) Wang Chang	(China) Liang Weikeng (China) Shang Yichen	(South Korea) Shin Tae-yang (South Korea) Wang Chan
Girls' doubles	(Indonesia) Febriana Dwipuji Kusuma (Indonesia) Ribka Sugiarto	(Malaysia) Pearly Tan Koong Le (Malaysia) Toh Ee Wei	(Indonesia) Agatha Imanuela (Indonesia) Siti Fadia Silva Ramadhanti
Girls' doubles	(Indonesia) Febriana Dwipuji Kusuma (Indonesia) Ribka Sugiarto	(Malaysia) Pearly Tan Koong Le (Malaysia) Toh Ee Wei	(China) Liu Xuanxuan (China) Xia Yuting
Mixed doubles	(China) Guo Xinwa (China) Liu Xuanxuan	(South Korea) Wang Chan (South Korea) Jeong Na-eun	(South Korea) Ki Dong-ju (South Korea) Lee Eun-ji
Mixed doubles	(China) Guo Xinwa (China) Liu Xuanxuan	(South Korea) Wang Chan (South Korea) Jeong Na-eun	(South Korea) Shin Tae-yang (South Korea) Lee Jung-hyun

=== Medal table ===
Rank	Nation	Gold	Silver	Bronze	Total
1	China	4	2	3	9
2	Indonesia*	1	0	4	5
3	India	1	0	0	1
4	South Korea	0	1	3	4
5	Japan	0	1	1	2
5	Malaysia	0	1	1	2
7	Thailand	0	1	0	1
Totals (7 entries)		6	6	12	24

== Team event ==
China emerged as the champion after winning three matches against Japan in the final. This was China's eighth title since the junior team championships became a mixed team event in 2006. Indonesia and Malaysia finished as the semifinalists, and took the bronze medals.

Quarter-finals
16 July
China	3
Chinese Taipei	0
16 July
Thailand	1
Indonesia	3
16 July
India	1
Japan	3
16 July
Malaysia	3
South Korea	2

Semi-finals
16 July
China	3
Indonesia	1
16 July
Japan	3
Malaysia	0

Final
17 July
China	3
Japan	0
