= Toh Ee Wei =

Malaysian badminton player (born 2000)

Toh Ee Wei 杜依蔚
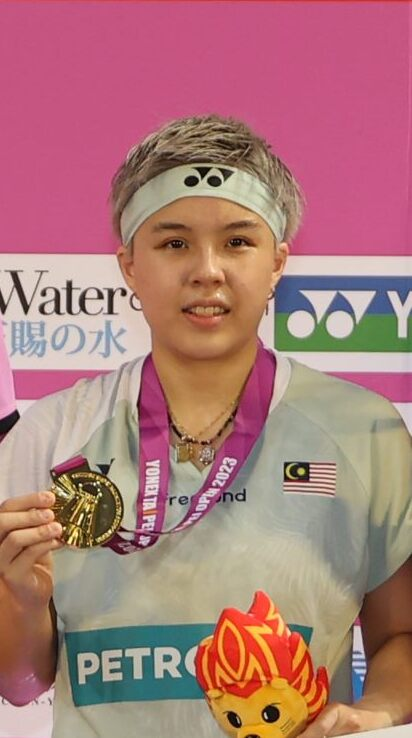
- Toh Ee Wei at the 2023 Taipei Open

Personal information
- Born: 18 September 2000 (age 26) Malacca, Malaysia
- Height: 1.62 m (5 ft 4 in)

Sport
- Country: Malaysia
- Sport: Badminton
- Handedness: Right
- Coached by: Nova Widianto

Mixed doubles
- Highest ranking: 3 (with Chen Tang Jie, 14 January 2025); 20 (with Hoo Pang Ron, 3 January 2023)
- Current ranking: 21 (with Chen Tang Jie, 10 November 2026)
- BWF profile
Medal record
Women's badminton
Representing Malaysia
World Championships
| Gold medal – first place | 2025 Paris | Mixed doubles |
Sudirman Cup
| Bronze medal – third place | 2023 Suzhou | Mixed team |
SEA Games
| Bronze medal – third place | 2025 Thailand | Women's team |
| Bronze medal – third place | 2025 Thailand | Mixed doubles |
World Junior Championships
| Silver medal – second place | 2016 Bilbao | Mixed team |
| Silver medal – second place | 2017 Yogyakarta | Mixed team |
| Silver medal – second place | 2018 Markham | Girls' doubles |
| Bronze medal – third place | 2016 Bilbao | Mixed doubles |
Asian Junior Championships
| Silver medal – second place | 2018 Jakarta | Girls' doubles |
| Bronze medal – third place | 2017 Jakarta | Mixed team |
| Bronze medal – third place | 2018 Jakarta | Mixed team |

Toh Ee Wei PPT (Chinese: 杜依蔚; pinyin: Dù Yíwéi; Pe̍h-ōe-jī: Tō͘ Î-ûi; born 18 September 2000) is a Malaysian badminton player. A world champion, she and her partner Chen Tang Jie won the mixed doubles title at the 2025 World Championships. She and Chen became the first ever world badminton champions in mixed doubles and the second ever world badminton champions from Malaysia after Aaron Chia and Soh Wooi Yik. She was the girls' doubles silver medalist at the 2018 Asian and World Junior Championships. She also won the 2016 World Junior bronze medal in the mixed doubles event. Partnered with Chen Tang Jie, she entered the mixed doubles top 10 of the BWF world ranking in September 2023.

== Achievements ==
=== BWF World Championships ===
Mixed doubles
| Year | Venue | Partner | Opponent | Score | Result |
|---|---|---|---|---|---|
| 2025 | Adidas Arena, Paris, France | (Malaysia) Chen Tang Jie | (China) Jiang Zhenbang (China) Wei Yaxin | 21–15, 21–14 | Gold |

=== SEA Games ===
Mixed doubles
| Year | Venue | Partner | Opponent | Score | Result |
|---|---|---|---|---|---|
| 2025 | Gymnasium 4, Thammasat University Rangsit Campus, Pathum Thani, Thailand | (Malaysia) Chen Tang Jie | (Thailand) Ruttanapak Oupthong (Thailand) Jhenicha Sudjaipraparat | 15–21, 16–21 | Bronze |

=== World Junior Championships ===
Girls' doubles
| Year | Venue | Partner | Opponent | Score | Result |
|---|---|---|---|---|---|
| 2018 | Markham Pan Am Centre, Markham, Canada | (Malaysia) Pearly Tan | (China) Liu Xuanxuan (China) Xia Yuting | 16–21, 16–21 | Silver |

Mixed doubles
| Year | Venue | Partner | Opponent | Score | Result |
|---|---|---|---|---|---|
| 2016 | Bilbao Arena, Bilbao, Spain | (Malaysia) Chen Tang Jie | (China) He Jiting (China) Du Yue | 14–21, 11–21 | Bronze |

=== Asian Junior Championships ===
Girls' doubles
| Year | Venue | Partner | Opponent | Score | Result |
|---|---|---|---|---|---|
| 2018 | Jaya Raya Sports Hall Training Center, Jakarta, Indonesia | (Malaysia) Pearly Tan | (Indonesia) Febriana Dwipuji Kusuma (Indonesia) Ribka Sugiarto | 12–21, 16–21 | Silver |

=== BWF World Tour (5 titles, 4 runners-up) ===
The BWF World Tour, which was announced on 19 March 2017 and implemented in 2018, is a series of elite badminton tournaments sanctioned by the Badminton World Federation (BWF). The BWF World Tours are divided into levels of World Tour Finals, Super 1000, Super 750, Super 500, Super 300 (part of the BWF World Tour), and the BWF Tour Super 100.

Mixed doubles
| Year | Tournament | Level | Partner | Opponent | Score | Result |
|---|---|---|---|---|---|---|
| 2023 | Orléans Masters | Super 300 | (Malaysia) Chen Tang Jie | (Chinese Taipei) Ye Hong-wei (Chinese Taipei) Lee Chia-hsin | 21–19, 21–17 | (gold) Winner |
| 2023 | Taipei Open | Super 300 | (Malaysia) Chen Tang Jie | (Chinese Taipei) Chiu Hsiang-chieh (Chinese Taipei) Lin Xiao-min | 21–12, 21–8 | (gold) Winner |
| 2024 | Thailand Masters | Super 300 | (Malaysia) Chen Tang Jie | (Thailand) Dechapol Puavaranukroh (Thailand) Sapsiree Taerattanachai | 12–21, 18–21 | (silver) Runner-up |
| 2024 | Swiss Open | Super 300 | (Malaysia) Chen Tang Jie | (Malaysia) Goh Soon Huat (Malaysia) Shevon Jemie Lai | 16–21, 13–21 | (silver) Runner-up |
| 2024 | Korea Open | Super 500 | (Malaysia) Chen Tang Jie | (China) Guo Xinwa (China) Li Qian | 17–21, 21–13, 21–13 | (gold) Winner |
| 2024 | BWF World Tour Finals | World Tour Finals | (Malaysia) Chen Tang Jie | (China) Zheng Siwei (China) Huang Yaqiong | 18–21, 21–14, 17–21 | (silver) Runner-up |
| 2025 | China Masters | Super 750 | (Malaysia) Chen Tang Jie | (Thailand) Dechapol Puavaranukroh (Thailand) Supissara Paewsampran | 8–21, 17–21 | (silver) Runner-up |
| 2025 | Australian Open | Super 500 | (Malaysia) Chen Tang Jie | (Indonesia) Jafar Hidayatullah (Indonesia) Felisha Pasaribu | 21–16, 21–11 | (gold) Winner |
| 2026 | Indonesia Masters | Super 500 | (Malaysia) Chen Tang Jie | (Denmark) Mathias Christiansen (Denmark) Alexandra Bøje | 15–21, 21–17, 21–11 | (gold) Winner |

=== BWF International Challenge/Series (5 titles, 1 runner-up) ===
Mixed doubles
| Year | Tournament | Partner | Opponent | Score | Result |
|---|---|---|---|---|---|
| 2021 | Polish Open | (Malaysia) Choong Hon Jian | (Switzerland) Nicolas A. Müller (Switzerland) Ronja Stern | 21–16, 21–12 | (gold) Winner |
| 2021 | Slovenian International | (Malaysia) Choong Hon Jian | (Indonesia) Putra Erwiansyah (Indonesia) Sofy Al Mushira Asharunnisa | 21–18, 21–18 | (gold) Winner |
| 2021 | Austrian Open | (Malaysia) Choong Hon Jian | (France) William Villeger (France) Sharone Bauer | 16–21, 21–9, 21–19 | (gold) Winner |
| 2022 | Bangladesh International | (Malaysia) Chen Tang Jie | (Thailand) Phatharathorn Nipornram (Thailand) Alisa Sapniti | 21–15, 21–13 | (gold) Winner |
| 2022 | Malaysia International | (Malaysia) Chen Tang Jie | (Malaysia) Hoo Pang Ron (Malaysia) Teoh Mei Xing | 21–18, 15–21, 19–21 | (silver) Runner-up |
| 2023 | Iran Fajr International | (Malaysia) Chen Tang Jie | (Malaysia) Hoo Pang Ron (Malaysia) Teoh Mei Xing | 21–19, 21–15 | (gold) Winner |

BWF International Challenge tournament
BWF International Series tournament

== Honours ==
=== Honours of Malaysia ===
- Perak
  - Distinguished Conduct Medal (PPT) (2025)
