= Yap Ling =

Malaysian badminton player (born 2000)

Yap Ling 叶灵
Personal information
- Born: 1 April 2000 (age 26) Malacca, Malaysia
- Height: 1.72 m (5 ft 8 in)

Sport
- Country: Malaysia
- Sport: Badminton
- Handedness: Right

Women's & mixed doubles
- Highest ranking: 67 (WD with Teoh Mei Xing, 17 March 2020); 258 (XD with Jeremy Juan, 5 September 2023)
- Current ranking: 260 (XD with Jeremy Juan, 19 September 2023)
- BWF profile
Medal record
Women's badminton
Representing Malaysia
Sudirman Cup
Bronze medal – third place	2021 Vantaa	Mixed team
World Junior Championships
Silver medal – second place	2017 Yogyakarta	Mixed team
Asian Junior Championships
Bronze medal – third place	2017 Jakarta	Mixed team
Bronze medal – third place	2018 Jakarta	Mixed team

Yap Ling (simplified Chinese: 叶灵; traditional Chinese: 葉靈; pinyin: Yè Líng; born 1 April 2000) is a Malaysian badminton player. She was part of the Malaysian squad that won a bronze medal in the 2021 Sudirman Cup. She also participated in the 2020 Thomas & Uber Cup.

== Career ==
In 2017, Yap represented Malaysia as a team member and won the bronze and silver medal in the mixed team events of the Badminton Asia Junior Championships and the BWF World Junior Championships respectively. At the 2018 Badminton Asia Junior Championships, she won the bronze medal in the mixed team event. Yap was then transferred from the Bukit Jalil Sports School (youth team) to the national team.

She partnered with Go Pei Kee and were semifinalists at the 2021 Czech Open. They participated in the 2021 SEA Games.

== Achievements ==
=== BWF International Challenge/Series (1 runner-up) ===
Women's doubles
Year	Tournament	Partner	Opponent	Score	Result
2019	India International	(Malaysia) Teoh Mei Xing	(Malaysia) Pearly Tan (Malaysia) Thinaah Muralitharan	18–21, 14–21	(silver) Runner-up

BWF International Challenge tournament
BWF International Series tournament
BWF Future Series tournament
