= 2023 Taipei Open =

Tournament details
- Dates: 20–25 June
- Edition: 40th
- Level: Super 300
- Total prize money: US$210,000
- Venue: Tian-mu Arena, University of Taipei
- Location: Taipei, Taiwan

Champions
- Men's singles: (Indonesia) Chico Aura Dwi Wardoyo
- Women's singles: (Chinese Taipei) Tai Tzu-ying
- Men's doubles: (Malaysia) Man Wei Chong (Malaysia) Tee Kai Wun
- Women's doubles: (South Korea) Lee Yu-lim (South Korea) Shin Seung-chan
- Mixed doubles: (Malaysia) Chen Tang Jie (Malaysia) Toh Ee Wei

The 2023 Taipei Open (officially known as the Yonex Taipei Open 2023) was a badminton tournament which took place at Tian-mu Arena, University of Taipei in Taipei, Taiwan, from 20 to 25 June 2023 and had a total purse of $210,000.

== Tournament ==
The 2023 Taipei Open was the fifteenth tournament of the 2023 BWF World Tour and also part of the Taipei Open championships, which had been held since 1980. This tournament was organized by the Chinese Taipei Badminton Association with sanction from the BWF.

=== Venue ===
This international tournament was held at Tian-mu Arena, University of Taipei in Taipei, Taiwan.

=== Point distribution ===
Below is the point distribution table for each phase of the tournament based on the BWF points system for the BWF World Tour Super 300 event.

Winner	Runner-up	3/4	5/8	9/16	17/32	33/64	65/128
7,000	5,950	4,900	3,850	2,750	1,670	660	320

=== Prize pool ===
The total prize money was US$210,000 with the distribution of the prize money in accordance with BWF regulations.

Event	Winner	Finalist	Semi-finals	Quarter-finals	Last 16
Singles	$15,750	$7,980	$3,045	$1,260	$735
Doubles	$16,590	$7,980	$2,940	$1,522.50	$787.50

== Men's singles ==
=== Seeds ===
1. (Japan) Kodai Naraoka (Withdrew)
2. (Chinese Taipei) Chou Tien-chen (Second round)
3. (India) Prannoy H. S. (Quarter-finals)
4. (Japan) Kenta Nishimoto (Quarter-finals)
5. (Hong Kong) Ng Ka Long (Semi-finals)
6. (Japan) Kanta Tsuneyama (Second round)
7. (Hong Kong) Lee Cheuk Yiu (First round)
8. (Indonesia) Chico Aura Dwi Wardoyo (Champion)

=== Finals ===
Semi-finals
(Chinese Taipei) Su Li-yang	21	21
5	(Hong Kong) Ng Ka Long	11	15
8	(Indonesia) Chico Aura Dwi Wardoyo	21	21
(Chinese Taipei) Wang Tzu-wei	6	18

Final
(Chinese Taipei) Su Li-yang	21	15
8	(Indonesia) Chico Aura Dwi Wardoyo	23	21

=== Top half ===
==== Section 1 ====
First round
PFQ	(India) Parupalli K	21	21
Q4	(Germany) S Hsiao	15	16
(Chinese Taipei) Su L-y	23	21
Q2	(Chinese Taipei) Liao J-f	21	15
6	(Japan) K Tsuneyama	21	21
(India) S Subramanian	13	5
(Chinese Taipei) Lin K-t	21	12	19
(Malaysia) Yeoh S Z	17	21	21

Second round
PFQ	(India) Parupalli K	16	17
(Chinese Taipei) Su L-y	21	21
6	(Japan) K Tsuneyama	19	15
(Malaysia) Yeoh S Z	21	21

Quarter-finals
(Chinese Taipei) Su L-y	21	21
(Malaysia) Yeoh S Z	5	17

==== Section 2 ====
First round
3	(India) Prannoy H. S.	21	21
Q1	(Chinese Taipei) Lin Y-h	11	10
(Chinese Taipei) Chen C-t	21	12	17
(Indonesia) T Sugiarto	18	21	21
5	(Hong Kong) Ng K L	21	21
(India) M L Maisnam	18	17
(South Korea) Jeon H-j	21	16
(Malaysia) Cheam J W	23	21

Second round
3	(India) Prannoy H. S.	21	21
(Indonesia) T Sugiarto	9	17
5	(Hong Kong) Ng K L	21	21
(Malaysia) Cheam J W	14	13

Quarter-finals
3	(India) Prannoy H. S.	19	8
5	(Hong Kong) Ng K L	21	21

=== Bottom half ===
==== Section 3 ====
First round
(Malaysia) Leong J H	22	12	21
(India) K George	20	21	9
(Chinese Taipei) Lu C-h	17	6
8	(Indonesia) C A D Wardoyo	21	21
(Malaysia) Soong J V	16	14
(Hong Kong) Chan Y C	21	21
Q3	(Malaysia) A Sholeh	13	4
4	(Japan) K Nishimoto	21	21

Second round
(Malaysia) Leong J H	18	21	16
8	(Indonesia) C A D Wardoyo	21	14	21
(Hong Kong) Chan Y C	17	14
4	(Japan) K Nishimoto	21	21

Quarter-finals
8	(Indonesia) C A D Wardoyo	21	21
4	(Japan) K Nishimoto	13	15

==== Section 4 ====
First round
(India) S Karunakaran	10	10
(Chinese Taipei) Chi Y-j	21	21
(Chinese Taipei) Wang T-w	21	21
7	(Hong Kong) Lee C Y	16	18
(Chinese Taipei) Lin C-y	21	21
(Chinese Taipei) Lee C-h	12	18
(India) M Manjunath	18	21	16
2	(Chinese Taipei) Chou T-c	21	14	21

Second round
(Chinese Taipei) Chi Y-j	12	17
(Chinese Taipei) Wang T-w	21	21
(Chinese Taipei) Lin C-y	21	11	21
2	(Chinese Taipei) Chou T-c	19	21	15

Quarter-finals
(Chinese Taipei) Wang T-w	21	24
(Chinese Taipei) Lin C-y	13	22

== Women's singles ==
=== Seeds ===
1. (Chinese Taipei) Tai Tzu-ying (Champion)
2. (Thailand) Busanan Ongbamrungphan (Withdrew)
3. (United States) Beiwen Zhang (Final)
4. (Chinese Taipei) Hsu Wen-chi (First round)
5. (Chinese Taipei) Pai Yu-po (Quarter-finals)
6. (Thailand) Supanida Katethong (Quarter-finals)
7. (South Korea) Kim Ga-eun (First round)
8. (Malaysia) Goh Jin Wei (First round)

=== Finals ===
Semi-finals
1	(Chinese Taipei) Tai Tzu-ying	21	21
(Thailand) Pornpicha Choeikeewong	12	16
3	(United States) Beiwen Zhang	21	21
(Thailand) Pitchamon Opatniput	18	15

Final
1	(Chinese Taipei) Tai Tzu-ying	21	21
3	(United States) Beiwen Zhang	14	17

=== Top half ===
==== Section 1 ====
First round
1	(Chinese Taipei) Tai T-y	21	21
(Chinese Taipei) Liang T-y	16	17
(Hungary) Á Kőrösi	7	17
(India) T Hemanth	21	21
6	(Thailand) S Katethong	21	17	21
(United States) J Gai	10	21	8
PFQ	(Azerbaijan) K F Azzahra
(Vietnam) Nguyễn T L	w	/	o

Second round
1	(Chinese Taipei) Tai T-y	21	21
(India) T Hemanth	11	6
6	(Thailand) S Katethong	21	21
(Vietnam) Nguyễn T L	15	14

Quarter-finals
1	(Chinese Taipei) Tai T-y	21	21
6	(Thailand) S Katethong	16	6

==== Section 2 ====
First round
4	(Chinese Taipei) Hsu W-c	21	11	8
(South Korea) Sim Y-j	16	21	21
PFQ	(Indonesia) Y Y Susanto	17	21	19
(Thailand) P Choeikeewong	21	15	21
5	(Chinese Taipei) Pai Y-p	21	21
Q2	(Chinese Taipei) Hung Y-t	12	14
(United States) I Wang	21	21
(Chinese Taipei) Lin H-t	14	18

Second round
(South Korea) Sim Y-j	17	21	19
(Thailand) P Choeikeewong	21	13	21
5	(Chinese Taipei) Pai Y-p	21	21
(United States) I Wang	16	19

Quarter-finals
(Thailand) P Choeikeewong	21	21
5	(Chinese Taipei) Pai Y-p	14	18

=== Bottom half ===
==== Section 3 ====
First round
Q1	(Chinese Taipei) Chiang Y-l	16	13
(Indonesia) P K Wardani	21	21
(Chinese Taipei) Huang C-p	22	21
8	(Malaysia) Goh J W	20	15
(Chinese Taipei) Chiu P-c	21	21
(India) G R Shivani	12	15
PFQ	(Australia) T Ho	7	10
3	(United States) BW Zhang	21	21

Second round
(Indonesia) P K Wardani	21	21
(Chinese Taipei) Huang C-p	13	19
(Chinese Taipei) Chiu P-c	18	11
3	(United States) BW Zhang	21	21

Quarter-finals
(Indonesia) P K Wardani	15	17
3	(United States) BW Zhang	21	21

==== Section 4 ====
First round
(Chinese Taipei) Sung S-y	21	21
Q3	(United States) D Gupta	8	9
Q4	(Chinese Taipei) Wang Y-s	21	21
7	(South Korea) Kim G-e	19	14
(Chinese Taipei) Huang Y-h	10	21	21
(India) A Kashyap	21	16	11
(Thailand) P Opatniput	14	21	21
PFQ	(Chinese Taipei) Chen S-y	21	10	9

Second round
(Chinese Taipei) Sung S-y	21	17	21
Q4	(Chinese Taipei) Wang Y-s	12	21	12
(Chinese Taipei) Huang Y-h	21	17
(Thailand) P Opatniput	23	21

Quarter-finals
(Chinese Taipei) Sung S-y	21	14	8
(Thailand) P Opatniput	19	21	21

== Men's doubles ==
=== Seeds ===
1. (Malaysia) Ong Yew Sin / Teo Ee Yi (Semi-finals)
2. (Chinese Taipei) Lu Ching-yao / Yang Po-han (Final)
3. (Chinese Taipei) Lee Yang / Wang Chi-lin (Second round)
4. (Chinese Taipei) Lee Jhe-huei / Yang Po-hsuan (Quarter-finals)
5. (Malaysia) Man Wei Chong / Tee Kai Wun (Champions)
6. (Chinese Taipei) Su Ching-heng / Ye Hong-wei (First round)
7. (Chinese Taipei) Chang Ko-chi / Po Li-wei (Second round)
8. (India) Krishna Prasad Garaga / Vishnuvardhan Goud Panjala (First round)

=== Finals ===
Semi-finals
1	(Malaysia) Ong Yew Sin (Malaysia) Teo Ee Yi	21	19	9
5	(Malaysia) Man Wei Chong (Malaysia) Tee Kai Wun	17	21	21
Q2	(Chinese Taipei) Lin Chia-yu (Chinese Taipei) Lin Yong-sheng	16	16
2	(Chinese Taipei) Lu Ching-yao (Chinese Taipei) Yang Po-han	21	21

Final
5	(Malaysia) Man Wei Chong (Malaysia) Tee Kai Wun	20	21	21
2	(Chinese Taipei) Lu Ching-yao (Chinese Taipei) Yang Po-han	22	17	14

=== Top half ===
==== Section 1 ====
First round
1	(Malaysia) Ong Y S (Malaysia) Teo E Y	15	21	21
(Chinese Taipei) Chiu H-c (Chinese Taipei) Yang M-t	21	12	15
(Malaysia) N M Azriyn A (Malaysia) Tan W K	21	18	23
(South Korea) Kim Y-h (South Korea) Wang C	17	21	21
6	(Chinese Taipei) Su C-h (Chinese Taipei) Ye H-w	21	17	14
Q4	(Chinese Taipei) Lin B-w (Chinese Taipei) Tseng P-c	18	21	21
(Chinese Taipei) Chiang C-w (Chinese Taipei) Wu H-y	12	15
(Chinese Taipei) Lee F-c (Chinese Taipei) Lee F-j	21	21

Second round
1	(Malaysia) Ong Y S (Malaysia) Teo E Y	18	21	21
(Malaysia) N M Azriyn A (Malaysia) Tan W K	21	15	18
Q4	(Chinese Taipei) Lin B-w (Chinese Taipei) Tseng P-c	9	15
(Chinese Taipei) Lee F-c (Chinese Taipei) Lee F-j	21	21

Quarter-finals
1	(Malaysia) Ong Y S (Malaysia) Teo E Y	15	21	21
(Chinese Taipei) Lee F-c (Chinese Taipei) Lee F-j	21	19	17

==== Section 2 ====
First round
4	(Chinese Taipei) Lee J-h (Chinese Taipei) Yang P-hs	21	17	21
(Chinese Taipei) Lin Y-c (Chinese Taipei) Su L-w	16	21	13
(Malaysia) Goh V S (Malaysia) Lim K W	17	14
(Chinese Taipei) Chen Z-r (Chinese Taipei) Lu C	21	21
5	(Malaysia) Man W C (Malaysia) Tee K W	21	21
(Canada) Lam W L (Canada) L K K Pong	12	11
(Philippines) C Bernardo (Philippines) A Morada	21	21
Q3	(Chinese Taipei) Cheng K-w (Chinese Taipei) Liao C-p	18	12

Second round
4	(Chinese Taipei) Lee J-h (Chinese Taipei) Yang P-hs	21	21
(Chinese Taipei) Chen Z-r (Chinese Taipei) Lu C	7	17
5	(Malaysia) Man W C (Malaysia) Tee K W	21	21
(Philippines) C Bernardo (Philippines) A Morada	11	15

Quarter-finals
4	(Chinese Taipei) Lee J-h (Chinese Taipei) Yang P-hs	19	19
5	(Malaysia) Man W C (Malaysia) Tee K W	21	21

=== Bottom half ===
==== Section 3 ====
First round
(Malaysia) Boon X Y (Malaysia) Wong T C	17	23	15
(South Korea) Jin Y (South Korea) Na S-s	21	21	21
(South Korea) Ko S-h (South Korea) Shin B-c	1^{r}
7	(Chinese Taipei) Chang K-c (Chinese Taipei) Po L-w	0
(Chinese Taipei) Lai C-l (Chinese Taipei) Lin S-k	10	14
Q2	(Chinese Taipei) Lin C-y (Chinese Taipei) Lin Y-s	21	21
(Algeria) K Mammeri (Algeria) Y S Medel	9	11
3	(Chinese Taipei) Lee Y (Chinese Taipei) Wang C-l	21	21

Second round
(South Korea) Jin Y (South Korea) Na S-s	21	19	21
7	(Chinese Taipei) Chang K-c (Chinese Taipei) Po L-w	16	21	15
Q2	(Chinese Taipei) Lin C-y (Chinese Taipei) Lin Y-s	21	23
3	(Chinese Taipei) Lee Y (Chinese Taipei) Wang C-l	15	21

Quarter-finals
(South Korea) Jin Y (South Korea) Na S-s	18	18
Q2	(Chinese Taipei) Lin C-y (Chinese Taipei) Lin Y-s	21	21

==== Section 4 ====
First round
(Chinese Taipei) Wei C-w (Chinese Taipei) Wu G-x	21	21
(United States) Chen Z-y (United States) P Smith	19	14
(United States) V Chiu (United States) J Yuan	21	20	21
8	(India) K P Garaga (India) V G Panjala	18	22	16
(Chinese Taipei) Chen C-k (Chinese Taipei) Chen S-f	17	19
Q1	(Chinese Taipei) Lee C-h (Chinese Taipei) Liu K-h	21	21
(Chinese Taipei) Lu M-c (Chinese Taipei) Tang K-w	22	20	11
2	(Chinese Taipei) Lu C-y (Chinese Taipei) Yang P-h	20	22	21

Second round
(Chinese Taipei) Wei C-w (Chinese Taipei) Wu G-x	21	21
(United States) V Chiu (United States) J Yuan	12	14
Q1	(Chinese Taipei) Lee C-h (Chinese Taipei) Liu K-h	17	22	12
2	(Chinese Taipei) Lu C-y (Chinese Taipei) Yang P-h	21	20	21

Quarter-finals
(Chinese Taipei) Wei C-w (Chinese Taipei) Wu G-x	17	21	18
2	(Chinese Taipei) Lu C-y (Chinese Taipei) Yang P-h	21	12	21

== Women's doubles ==
=== Seeds ===
1. (Indonesia) Febriana Dwipuji Kusuma / Amalia Cahaya Pratiwi (Final)
2. (Malaysia) Vivian Hoo / Lim Chiew Sien (Second round)
3. (Chinese Taipei) Lee Chia-hsin / Teng Chun-hsun (Semi-finals)
4. (Indonesia) Lanny Tria Mayasari / Ribka Sugiarto (Withdrew)
5. (South Korea) Lee Yu-lim / Shin Seung-chan (Champions)
6. (Hong Kong) Ng Wing Yung / Lui Lok Lok (Quarter-finals)
7. (Chinese Taipei) Hsu Ya-ching / Lin Wan-ching (First round)
8. (United States) Annie Xu / Kerry Xu (Quarter-finals)

=== Finals ===
Semi-finals
1	(Indonesia) Febriana Dwipuji Kusuma (Indonesia) Amalia Cahaya Pratiwi	21	21
3	(Chinese Taipei) Lee Chia-hsin (Chinese Taipei) Teng Chun-hsun	16	19
5	(South Korea) Lee Yu-lim (South Korea) Shin Seung-chan	21	21
(Chinese Taipei) Hung En-tzu (Chinese Taipei) Lin Yu-pei	11	9

Final
1	(Indonesia) Febriana Dwipuji Kusuma (Indonesia) Amalia Cahaya Pratiwi	21	17	17
5	(South Korea) Lee Yu-lim (South Korea) Shin Seung-chan	18	21	21

=== Top half ===
==== Section 1 ====
First round
1	(Indonesia) F D Kusuma (Indonesia) A C Pratiwi	21	21
Q4	(Chinese Taipei) Chen Y-f (Chinese Taipei) Sun L-c	18	15
(Chinese Taipei) Cheng Y-p (Chinese Taipei) Sun W-p	21	28	21
(India) R Panda (India) S Panda	7	30	12
8	(United States) A Xu (United States) K Xu	21	8	21
(Australia) S Mapasa (Australia) A Yu	13	21	19
Q2	(Chinese Taipei) Chung C-e (Chinese Taipei) Huang T-l	19	21	19
(New Zealand) E Calder-Hawkins (New Zealand) A Pak	21	17	21

Second round
1	(Indonesia) F D Kusuma (Indonesia) A C Pratiwi	21	21
(Chinese Taipei) Cheng Y-p (Chinese Taipei) Sun W-p	19	11
8	(United States) A Xu (United States) K Xu	21	21
(New Zealand) E Calder-Hawkins (New Zealand) A Pak	12	7

Quarter-finals
1	(Indonesia) F D Kusuma (Indonesia) A C Pratiwi	21	21
8	(United States) A Xu (United States) K Xu	14	15

==== Section 2 ====
First round
3	(Chinese Taipei) Lee C-h (Chinese Taipei) Teng C-h	21	21
(Thailand) P Pattanawaritthipan (Thailand) A Povanon	13	15
(Australia) K Ea (Australia) G Somerville	21	21
(Chinese Taipei) Lin C-c (Chinese Taipei) Wu M-c	18	10
7	(Chinese Taipei) Hsu Y-c (Chinese Taipei) Lin W-c	20	21	17
(Chinese Taipei) Liu C-y (Chinese Taipei) Wang Y-q	22	12	21
(Hong Kong) Fan K Y (Hong Kong) Yau M Y	19	21	21
(Chinese Taipei) Chang C-h (Chinese Taipei) Yang C-t	21	9	14

Second round
3	(Chinese Taipei) Lee C-h (Chinese Taipei) Teng C-h	21	21
(Australia) K Ea (Australia) G Somerville	9	9
(Chinese Taipei) Liu C-y (Chinese Taipei) Wang Y-q	9	21	21
(Hong Kong) Fan K Y (Hong Kong) Yau M Y	21	11	17

Quarter-finals
3	(Chinese Taipei) Lee C-h (Chinese Taipei) Teng C-h	21	21
(Chinese Taipei) Liu C-y (Chinese Taipei) Wang Y-q	13	11

=== Bottom half ===
==== Section 3 ====
First round
(Indonesia) M T Puspita Sari (Indonesia) R A Rose	25	23
(Chinese Taipei) Hsieh P-s (Chinese Taipei) Tseng Y-c	23	21
Q3	(Chinese Taipei) Huang Z-l (Chinese Taipei) Jiang Y-h	10	8
5	(South Korea) Lee Y-l (South Korea) Shin S-c	21	21
(Chinese Taipei) Hu L-f (Chinese Taipei) Lin X-m	23	21
(Chinese Taipei) Li Z-q (Chinese Taipei) Wang Y-z	21	17
(Chinese Taipei) Hsieh Y-e (Chinese Taipei) Peng L-t	23	13	11
PFQ	(Chinese Taipei) Lee Y-h (Chinese Taipei) Wei W-y	21	21	21

Second round
(Indonesia) M T Puspita Sari (Indonesia) R A Rose	15	18
5	(South Korea) Lee Y-l (South Korea) Shin S-c	21	21
(Chinese Taipei) Hu L-f (Chinese Taipei) Lin X-m	21	21
PFQ	(Chinese Taipei) Lee Y-h (Chinese Taipei) Wei W-y	12	15

Quarter-finals
5	(South Korea) Lee Y-l (South Korea) Shin S-c	21	21
(Chinese Taipei) Hu L-f (Chinese Taipei) Lin X-m	16	11

==== Section 4 ====
First round
(Chinese Taipei) Chiu P-c (Chinese Taipei) Sung S-y	16	21	21
(Chinese Taipei) Chen S-y (Chinese Taipei) Jheng Y-c	21	11	12
(Chinese Taipei) Sung Y-h (Chinese Taipei) Wang S-m	10	13
6	(Hong Kong) Ng W Y (Hong Kong) Lui L L	21	21
(Chinese Taipei) Hung E-t (Chinese Taipei) Lin Y-p	17	21	21
(Chinese Taipei) Liu Z-x (Chinese Taipei) Yang Y-h	21	17	15
Q1
2	(Malaysia) V Hoo (Malaysia) Lim C S	w	/	o

Second round
(Chinese Taipei) Chiu P-c (Chinese Taipei) Sung S-y	11	19
6	(Hong Kong) Ng W Y (Hong Kong) Lui L L	21	21
(Chinese Taipei) Hung E-t (Chinese Taipei) Lin Y-p	21	21
2	(Malaysia) V Hoo (Malaysia) Lim C S	19	18

Quarter-finals
6	(Hong Kong) Ng W Y (Hong Kong) Lui L L	18	22	19
(Chinese Taipei) Hung E-t (Chinese Taipei) Lin Y-p	21	20	21

== Mixed doubles ==
=== Seeds ===
1. (Malaysia) Goh Soon Huat / Shevon Jemie Lai (withdrew)
2. (Indonesia) Rehan Naufal Kusharjanto / Lisa Ayu Kusumawati (Second round)
3. (Indonesia) Rinov Rivaldy / Pitha Haningtyas Mentari (Second round)
4. (Malaysia) Chen Tang Jie / Toh Ee Wei (Champions)
5. (Chinese Taipei) Ye Hong-wei / Lee Chia-hsin (Semi-finals)
6. (Chinese Taipei) Chang Ko-chi / Lee Chih-chen (Quarter-finals)
7. (Chinese Taipei) Yang Po-hsuan / Hu Ling-fang (Quarter-finals)
8. (Malaysia) Chan Peng Soon / Cheah Yee See (First round)

=== Finals ===
Semi-finals
5	(Chinese Taipei) Ye Hong-wei (Chinese Taipei) Lee Chia-hsin	14	19
4	(Malaysia) Chen Tang Jie (Malaysia) Toh Ee Wei	21	21
(Chinese Taipei) Chiu Hsiang-chieh (Chinese Taipei) Lin Xiao-min	21	21
Q4	(Chinese Taipei) Tseng Min-hao (Chinese Taipei) Hsieh Pei-shan	10	8

Final
4	(Malaysia) Chen Tang Jie (Malaysia) Toh Ee Wei	21	21
(Chinese Taipei) Chiu Hsiang-chieh (Chinese Taipei) Lin Xiao-min	12	8

=== Top half ===
==== Section 1 ====
First round
PFQ	(South Korea) Wang C (South Korea) Shin S-c	14	15
(South Korea) Kim Y-h (South Korea) Lee Y-l	21	21
(Chinese Taipei) Lee F-c (Chinese Taipei) Sun W-p	13	11
(Malaysia) Hoo P R (Malaysia) Teoh M X	21	21
5	(Chinese Taipei) Ye H-w (Chinese Taipei) Lee C-h	21	23
Q2	(Malaysia) Wong T C (Malaysia) Lim C S	19	21
(Chinese Taipei) Po L-w (Chinese Taipei) Chang C-h	21	21
PFQ	(Thailand) T Viriyangkura (Thailand) O Jongsathapornparn	14	19

Second round
(South Korea) Kim Y-h (South Korea) Lee Y-l	21	16	14
(Malaysia) Hoo P R (Malaysia) Teoh M X	19	21	21
5	(Chinese Taipei) Ye H-w (Chinese Taipei) Lee C-h	7	21	21
(Chinese Taipei) Po L-w (Chinese Taipei) Chang C-h	21	13	14

Quarter-finals
(Malaysia) Hoo P R (Malaysia) Teoh M X	18	14
5	(Chinese Taipei) Ye H-w (Chinese Taipei) Lee C-h	21	21

==== Section 2 ====
First round
4	(Malaysia) Chen T J (Malaysia) Toh E W	21	21
(Algeria) K Mammeri (Algeria) T Mammeri	12	11
(Thailand) R Oupthong (Thailand) J Sudjaipraparat	24	19	21
(Indonesia) A Maulana (Indonesia) N V Marwah	22	21	16
7	(Chinese Taipei) Yang P-hs (Chinese Taipei) Hu L-f	21	21
(Chinese Taipei) Chen X-y (Chinese Taipei) Yang C-t	9	13
(Chinese Taipei) Lin B-w (Chinese Taipei) Lin C-c	21	15
(Chinese Taipei) Lee J-h (Chinese Taipei) Hsu Y-c	23	21

Second round
4	(Malaysia) Chen T J (Malaysia) Toh E W	21	21
(Thailand) R Oupthong (Thailand) J Sudjaipraparat	13	13
7	(Chinese Taipei) Yang P-hs (Chinese Taipei) Hu L-f	14	21	21
(Chinese Taipei) Lee J-h (Chinese Taipei) Hsu Y-c	21	19	18

Quarter-finals
4	(Malaysia) Chen T J (Malaysia) Toh E W	21	21
7	(Chinese Taipei) Yang P-hs (Chinese Taipei) Hu L-f	15	14

=== Bottom half ===
==== Section 3 ====
First round
(India) B Navaneeth (India) P Konjengbam	14	17
(India) R Kapoor (India) N. S. Reddy	21	21
(Chinese Taipei) Chiu H-c (Chinese Taipei) Lin X-m	24	21
8	(Malaysia) Chan P S (Malaysia) Cheah Y S	22	12
(Chinese Taipei) Lu M-c (Chinese Taipei) Chung K-y	10	18
(Indonesia) J Hidayatullah (Indonesia) A S P Pranata	21	21
(Australia) K Choo (Australia) G Somerville	16	14
3	(Indonesia) R Rivaldy (Indonesia) P H Mentari	21	21

Second round
(India) R Kapoor (India) N. S. Reddy	13	18
(Chinese Taipei) Chiu H-c (Chinese Taipei) Lin X-m	21	21
(Indonesia) J Hidayatullah (Indonesia) A S P Pranata	15	21	21
3	(Indonesia) R Rivaldy (Indonesia) P H Mentari	21	13	19

Quarter-finals
(Chinese Taipei) Chiu H-c (Chinese Taipei) Lin X-m	21	19	21
(Indonesia) J Hidayatullah (Indonesia) A S P Pranata	12	21	17

==== Section 4 ====
First round
Q3	(Chinese Taipei) Lin C-y (Chinese Taipei) Liu Z-x	15	13
(Hong Kong) Yeung S C (Hong Kong) Fan K Y	21	21
(Chinese Taipei) Liao C-p (Chinese Taipei) Liu C-y	11	17
6	(Chinese Taipei) Chang K-c (Chinese Taipei) Lee C-c	21	21
Q1	(Chinese Taipei) Chen Z-r (Chinese Taipei) Jiang Y-h	15	14
Q4	(Chinese Taipei) Tseng M-h (Chinese Taipei) Hsieh P-s	21	21
(United States) V Chiu (United States) J Gai	16	12
2	(Indonesia) R N Kusharjanto (Indonesia) L A Kusumawati	21	21

Second round
(Hong Kong) Yeung S C (Hong Kong) Fan K Y	9	23
6	(Chinese Taipei) Chang K-c (Chinese Taipei) Lee C-c	21	25
Q4	(Chinese Taipei) Tseng M-h (Chinese Taipei) Hsieh P-s	25	16	21
2	(Indonesia) R N Kusharjanto (Indonesia) L A Kusumawati	23	21	19

Quarter-finals
6	(Chinese Taipei) Chang K-c (Chinese Taipei) Lee C-c	20	21	15
Q4	(Chinese Taipei) Tseng M-h (Chinese Taipei) Hsieh P-s	22	12	21

Preceded by 2023 Indonesia Open	BWF World Tour; 2023 BWF season	Succeeded by 2023 Canada Open
