= Febriana Dwipuji Kusuma =

Indonesian badminton player (born 2001)

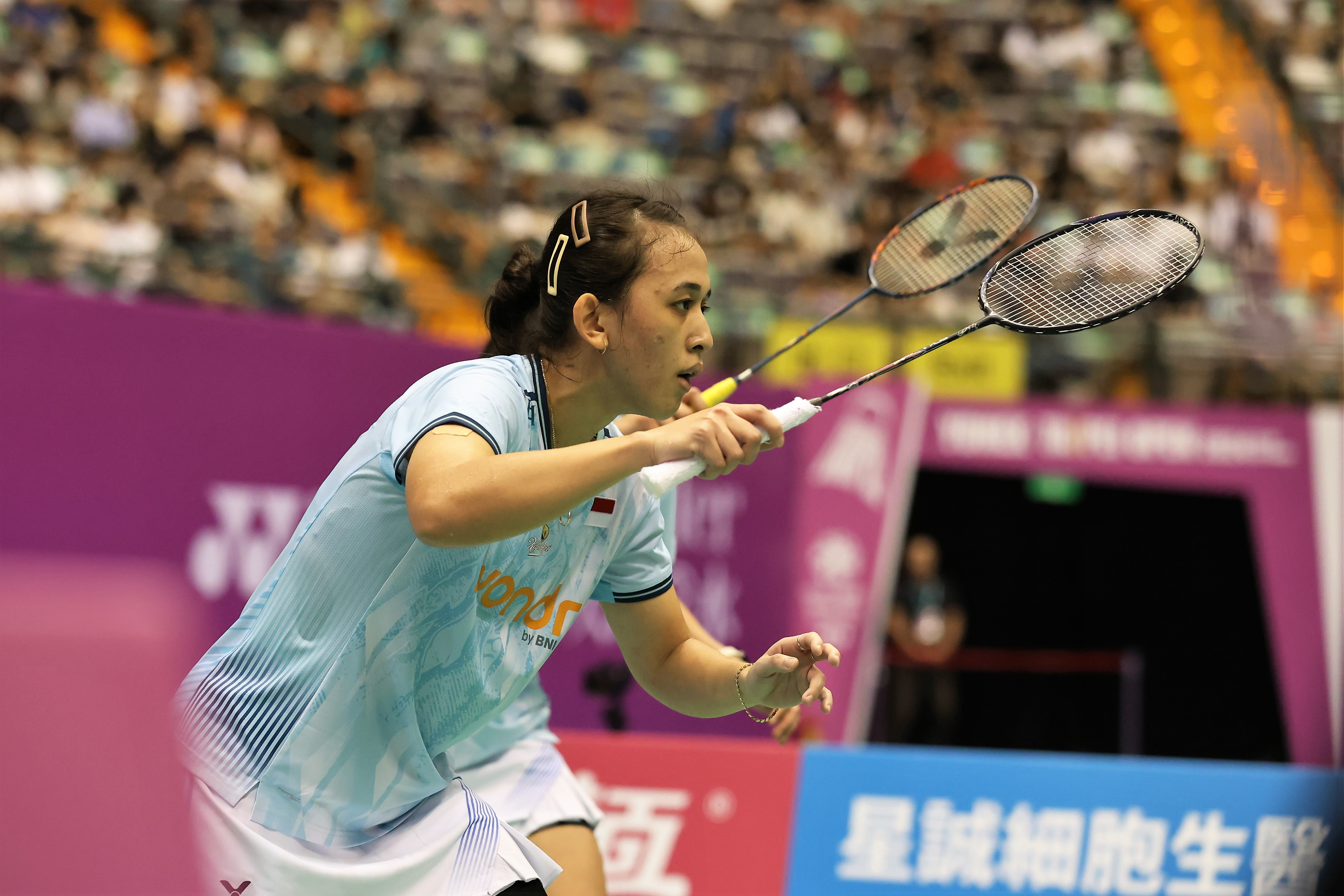
- Kusuma at the 2024 Taipei Open

Personal information
- Born: 20 February 2001 (age 25) Jember, East Java, Indonesia
- Height: 1.63 m (5 ft 4 in)

Sport
- Country: Indonesia
- Sport: Badminton
- Handedness: Right

Women's doubles
- Highest ranking: 8 (with Amallia Cahaya Pratiwi, 14 January 2025); 8 (with Meilysa Trias Puspita Sari, 20 October 2026)
- Current ranking: 10 (with Meilysa Trias Puspita Sari, 10 November 2026)
- BWF profile
Medal record
Women's badminton
Representing Indonesia
Sudirman Cup
Bronze medal – third place	2025 Xiamen	Mixed team
Uber Cup
Bronze medal – third place	2026 Horsens	Women's team
Asian Games
Bronze medal – third place	2026 Aichi–Nagoya	Women's team
Asia Team Championships
Gold medal – first place	2022 Selangor	Women's team
Bronze medal – third place	2024 Selangor	Women's team
Bronze medal – third place	2026 Qingdao	Women's team
SEA Games
Gold medal – first place	2023 Cambodia	Women's doubles
Silver medal – second place	2023 Cambodia	Women's team
Silver medal – second place	2025 Thailand	Women's doubles
Silver medal – second place	2025 Thailand	Women's team
World Junior Championships
Gold medal – first place	2019 Kazan	Mixed team
Silver medal – second place	2019 Kazan	Girls' doubles
Bronze medal – third place	2018 Markham	Girls' doubles
Bronze medal – third place	2018 Markham	Mixed team
Asian Junior Championships
Gold medal – first place	2018 Jakarta	Girls' doubles
Silver medal – second place	2019 Suzhou	Mixed team
Bronze medal – third place	2018 Jakarta	Mixed team

Febriana Dwipuji Kusuma (born 20 February 2001) is an Indonesian badminton player affiliated with the Djarum club. She was part of the national junior team that won the first Suhandinata Cup for Indonesia in 2019 BWF World Junior Championships. She also featured in the Indonesian women's winning team at the 2022 Asia Team Championships.

== Career ==
=== 2022 ===
In September, Febriana Dwipuji Kusuma with her partner Amallia Cahaya Pratiwi competed at the Japan Open, but lost in the quarter-finals against eventual winner Korean pair Jeong Na-eun and Kim Hye-jeong.

In October, Kusuma competed at the Vietnam Open as 2nd seed, but lost in the final from 1st seed Thai pair Benyapa Aimsaard and Nuntakarn Aimsaard.

=== 2023 ===
In January, Febriana Dwipuji Kusuma with her partner Amallia Cahaya Pratiwi lost in the second round of the Malaysia Open from first seed Chinese pair Chen Qingchen and Jia Yifan. They competed at the home tournament, Indonesia Masters, but had to lose in the first round from Chinese pair Li Wenmei and Liu Xuanxuan in a dramatic match. In the next tournament, they lost in the second round of the Thailand Masters from youngster Chinese pair Li Yijing and Luo Xumin who started from qualification.

In March, Kusuma and Pratiwi competed in the Swiss Open but had to lose in the second round from Japanese pair Rena Miyaura and Ayako Sakuramoto. In the next tour, they competed in the Spain Masters, but had to lose in the second round from Chinese pair Liu Shengshu and Tan Ning.

In April, Kusuma and Pratiwi competed at the Orléans Masters in France, but had to lose in the quarter-finals from fellow Indonesian pair Lanny Tria Mayasari and Ribka Sugiarto. In late April, she competed at the Asian Championships in Dubai, United Arab Emirates, but had to lose in the quarter-finals from Thai pair Jongkolphan Kititharakul and Rawinda Prajongjai.

In May, Kusuma made her debut at the SEA Games, and won a silver medal in the team event, and later clinched the women's doubles gold with Pratiwi. In late May, Kusuma competed in the second Asian tour at the Malaysia Masters, but had to lose in the first round from Korean pair Lee Yu-lim and Shin Seung-chan in straight games. In the following week, she were lost at the first round of the Thailand Open from the same Korean pair Lee Yu-lim and Shin Seung-chan in three games.

In June, Kusuma competed at the Singapore Open, but had to lose in the second round from 7th seed Japanese pair Mayu Matsumoto and Wakana Nagahara in three games. In the next tour, she competed at the home tournament, Indonesia Open, but lost in the second round again from 1st seed Chinese pair Chen Qingchen and Jia Yifan in straight games. In late June, she competed at the Taipei Open as 1st seed, but lost in the final from 5th seed Korean pair Lee Yu-lim and Shin Seung-chan for the thrice time.

In late July, Kusuma competed at the Japan Open, but lost in the quarter-finals against 4th seed Korean pair Kim So-yeong and Kong Hee-yong.

In early August, Kusuma competed at the Australian Open, but had to lose in the second round from Thai pair Rena Miyaura and Ayako Sakuramoto in straight games. In late August, she competed at the World Championships, but lost in the third round from 8th seed Thai pair Jongkolphan Kititharakul and Rawinda Prajongjai in rubber games. Kusuma made her first appearance at the Asian Games in 2022 Hangzhou, but she failed to win any medals in the women's doubles and team events.

=== 2025 ===
In 2025, Kusuma made her second appearance at the SEA Games, this time with her new partner Meilysa Trias Puspita Sari. Playing as the second women's doubles in the team event, they managed to help the team reach the final, but were defeated again by defending champions Thailand, securing the silver medal. In individual women's doubles event, Kusuma and Puspita Sari managed to reach the final but lost against Pearly Tan and Thinaah Muralitharan.

=== 2026 ===
In 2026, Kusuma made her second appearance at the Asian Games in Aichi–Nagoya. She won the bronze medal in the women's team event. In the individual women's doubles, she and her partner Puspita Sari were knocked-out by number 2 seed Baek Ha-na and Lee So-hee in the early rounds.

== Achievements ==
=== SEA Games ===
Women's doubles
Year	Venue	Partner	Opponent	Score	Result	Ref.
2023	Morodok Techo Badminton Hall; Phnom Penh, Cambodia	(Indonesia) Amallia Cahaya Pratiwi	(Indonesia) Meilysa Trias Puspita Sari (Indonesia) Rachel Allessya Rose	21–17, 21–16	Gold	
2025	Gymnasium 4, Thammasat University Rangsit Campus; Pathum Thani, Thailand	(Indonesia) Meilysa Trias Puspita Sari	(Malaysia) Pearly Tan (Malaysia) Thinaah Muralitharan	16–21, 21–19, 17–21	Silver	

=== BWF World Junior Championships ===
Girls' doubles
Year	Venue	Partner	Opponent	Score	Result
2018	Markham Pan Am Centre; Markham, Canada	(Indonesia) Ribka Sugiarto	(Malaysia) Pearly Tan (Malaysia) Toh Ee Wei	19–21, 19–21	Bronze
2019	Kazan Gymnastics Center; Kazan, Russia	(Indonesia) Amallia Cahaya Pratiwi	(China) Lin Fangling (China) Zhou Xinru	20–22, 21–11, 14–21	Silver

=== Asian Junior Championships ===
Girls' doubles
Year	Venue	Partner	Opponent	Score	Result
2018	Jaya Raya Sports Hall Training Center; Jakarta, Indonesia	(Indonesia) Ribka Sugiarto	(Malaysia) Pearly Tan (Malaysia) Toh Ee Wei	21–12, 21–16	Gold

=== BWF World Tour (2 titles, 6 runners-up) ===
The BWF World Tour, which was announced on 19 March 2017 and implemented in 2018, is a series of elite badminton tournaments sanctioned by the Badminton World Federation (BWF). The BWF World Tour is divided into levels of World Tour Finals, Super 1000, Super 750, Super 500, Super 300 (part of the HSBC World Tour), and the BWF Tour Super 100.

Women's doubles
Year	Tournament	Level	Partner	Opponent	Score	Result	Ref.
2022	Vietnam Open	Super 100	(Indonesia) Amallia Cahaya Pratiwi	(Thailand) Benyapa Aimsaard (Thailand) Nuntakarn Aimsaard	16–21, 25–27	(silver) Runner-up	
2023	Taipei Open	Super 300	(Indonesia) Amallia Cahaya Pratiwi	(South Korea) Lee Yu-lim (South Korea) Shin Seung-chan	21–18, 17–21, 17–21	(silver) Runner-up	
2024	Spain Masters	Super 300	(Indonesia) Amallia Cahaya Pratiwi	(Japan) Rin Iwanaga (Japan) Kie Nakanishi	21–12, 8–21, 16–21	(silver) Runner-up	
2024	Thailand Open	Super 500	(Indonesia) Amallia Cahaya Pratiwi	(Thailand) Jongkolphan Kititharakul (Thailand) Rawinda Prajongjai	14–21, 14–21	(silver) Runner-up	
2024	Australian Open	Super 500	(Indonesia) Amallia Cahaya Pratiwi	(Malaysia) Lai Pei Jing (Malaysia) Lim Chiew Sien	12–21, 21–7, 21–13	(gold) Winner	
2024	Taipei Open	Super 300	(Indonesia) Amallia Cahaya Pratiwi	(Indonesia) Jesita Putri Miantoro (Indonesia) Febi Setianingrum	21–15, 21–16	(gold) Winner	
2025	Australian Open	Super 500	(Indonesia) Meilysa Trias Puspita Sari	(Indonesia) Rachel Allessya Rose (Indonesia) Febi Setianingrum	21–18, 19–21, 21–23	(silver) Runner-up	
2026	Australian Open	Super 500	(Indonesia) Meilysa Trias Puspita Sari	(China) Jia Yifan (China) Zhang Shuxian	22–24, 13–21	(silver) Runner-up	

=== BWF International Challenge/Series (1 title, 2 runners-up) ===
Women's doubles
Year	Tournament	Partner	Opponent	Score	Result
2017	Indonesia International	(Indonesia) Tiara Rosalia Nuraidah	(Indonesia) Agatha Imanuela (Indonesia) Siti Fadia Silva Ramadhanti	21–19, 21–18	(gold) Winner
2019	Finnish Open	(Indonesia) Ribka Sugiarto	(Japan) Erina Honda (Japan) Nozomi Shimizu	15–21, 14–21	(silver) Runner-up
2019	Malaysia International	(Indonesia) Ribka Sugiarto	(Malaysia) Pearly Tan (Malaysia) Thinaah Muralitharan	16–21, 21–11, 18–21	(silver) Runner-up

BWF International Challenge tournament
BWF International Series tournament

=== BWF Junior International (3 titles, 2 runners-up) ===
Girls' doubles
Year	Tournament	Partner	Opponent	Score	Result
2016	Malaysia Junior International	(Indonesia) Ribka Sugiarto	(Malaysia) Thinaah Muralitharan (Malaysia) Tan Sueh Jeou	11–7, 12–14, 4–11, 11–6, 11–9	(gold) Winner
2018	India Junior International	(Indonesia) Ribka Sugiarto	(Indonesia) Metya Inayah Cindiani (Indonesia) Febby Valencia Dwijayanti Gani	19–21, 19–21	(silver) Runner-up
2018	Malaysia Junior International	(Indonesia) Ribka Sugiarto	(Malaysia) Pearly Tan (Malaysia) Toh Ee Wei	13–21, 18–21	(silver) Runner-up
2019	Jakarta Junior International	(Indonesia) Amallia Cahaya Pratiwi	(Indonesia) Melanni Mamahit (Indonesia) Tryola Nadia	21–15, 21–16	(gold) Winner
2019	Malaysia Junior International	(Indonesia) Amallia Cahaya Pratiwi	(Indonesia) Helena Ayu Puspitasari (Indonesia) Aldira Rizki Putri	22–20, 21–12	(gold) Winner

BWF Junior International Grand Prix tournament
BWF Junior International Challenge tournament
BWF Junior International Series tournament
BWF Junior Future Series tournament

== Performance timeline ==
Key

W	Won	F	Finalist	SF	Semi-finalist
QF	Quarter-finalist	#R	Rounds 4, 3, 2, 1	RR	Round-robin stage
Q#	Qualification round	A	Absent	w/d	Withdrew
G	Gold	S	Silver	B	Bronze
NH	Not held	N/A	Not applicable	DNQ	Did not qualify

=== National team ===
- Junior level

Event	2018	2019	Ref
Asian Junior Championships	B	S	
World Junior Championships	B	G	

- Senior level

Team events	2022	2023	2024	2025	2026	Ref
SEA Games	NH	S	NH	S	NH	
Asia Team Championships	G	NH	B	NH	B	
Asian Games	QF	NH			B	
Uber Cup	QF	NH	A	NH	B	
Sudirman Cup	NH	A	NH	B	NH	

=== Individual competitions ===
==== Junior level ====
- Girls' doubles

Event	2017	2018	2019
Asian Junior Championships	1R	G	2R
World Junior Championships	A	B	S

==== Senior level ====
- Women's doubles

Event	2022	2023	2024	2025	2026	Ref
SEA Games	NH	G	NH	S	NH	
Asian Championships	1R	QF	w/d	QF	1R	
Asian Games	2R	NH			2R	
World Championships	1R	3R	NH	QF	QF	

Tournament	BWF Superseries / Grand Prix		BWF World Tour									Best	Ref
Tournament	2016	2017	2018	2019	2020	2021	2022	2023	2024	2025	2026	Best	Ref
Malaysia Open	A				NH		2R	2R	A	1R	QF	QF ('26)	
Indonesia Masters	A	NH	2R	1R	A	1R	1R	1R	1R	QF	2R	QF ('25)	
Thailand Masters	A			2R	A	NH		2R	SF	1R	SF	SF ('24, '26)	
All England Open	A									2R	QF	QF ('26)	
Swiss Open	A				NH	A		2R	2R	SF	2R	SF ('25)	
Lingshui China Masters	N/A		A	2R	NH			A				2R ('19)	
Orléans Masters	N/A		2R	A	NH	w/d	A	QF	2R	A	2R	QF ('23)	
Thailand Open	A					NH	1R	1R	F	QF	A	F ('24)	
Malaysia Masters	A			Q2	A	NH	2R	1R	2R	QF	A	QF ('25)	
Singapore Open	A				NH		QF	2R	A			QF ('22)	
Indonesia Open	1R	Q2	A		NH	QF	2R	2R	1R	QF	QF	QF ('21, '25, '26)	
Australian Open	A				NH		2R	2R	W	F	F	W ('24)	
Japan Open	A				NH		QF	QF	A	2R	QF	QF ('22, '23, '26)	
China Open	A				NH			1R	A	2R	1R	2R ('25)	
Taipei Open	A				NH		w/d	F	W	A		W ('24)	
Korea Masters	A				NH		A		SF	A		SF ('24)	
China Masters	A				NH			w/d	QF	1R	A	QF ('24)	
Indonesia Masters Super 100	NH		SF	A	NH		A					SF ('18)	
Vietnam Open	A				NH		F	A				F ('22)	
Arctic Open	N/A				NH			A		2R	A	2R ('25)	
Denmark Open	A						1R	QF	A	2R	1R	QF ('23)	
French Open	A				NH	A	2R	1R	A	2R	1R	2R ('22, '25)	
Hylo Open	A						1R	2R	A		QF	QF ('26)	
Japan Masters	NH							1R	2R	A	QF	QF ('26)	
Hong Kong Open	A				NH			1R	QF	2R	1R	QF ('23)	
Superseries / World Tour Finals	DNQ								RR	DNQ		RR ('24)	
Hyderabad Open	NH		2R	A	NH							2R ('18)	
Spain Masters	NH		A			1R	NH	2R	F	NH		F ('24)	
Year-end ranking	159	224	80	84	126	117	22	17	9	10		8	
Tournament	2016	2017	2018	2019	2020	2021	2022	2023	2024	2025	2026	Best	Ref
