= Amallia Cahaya Pratiwi =

Indonesian badminton player (born 2001)

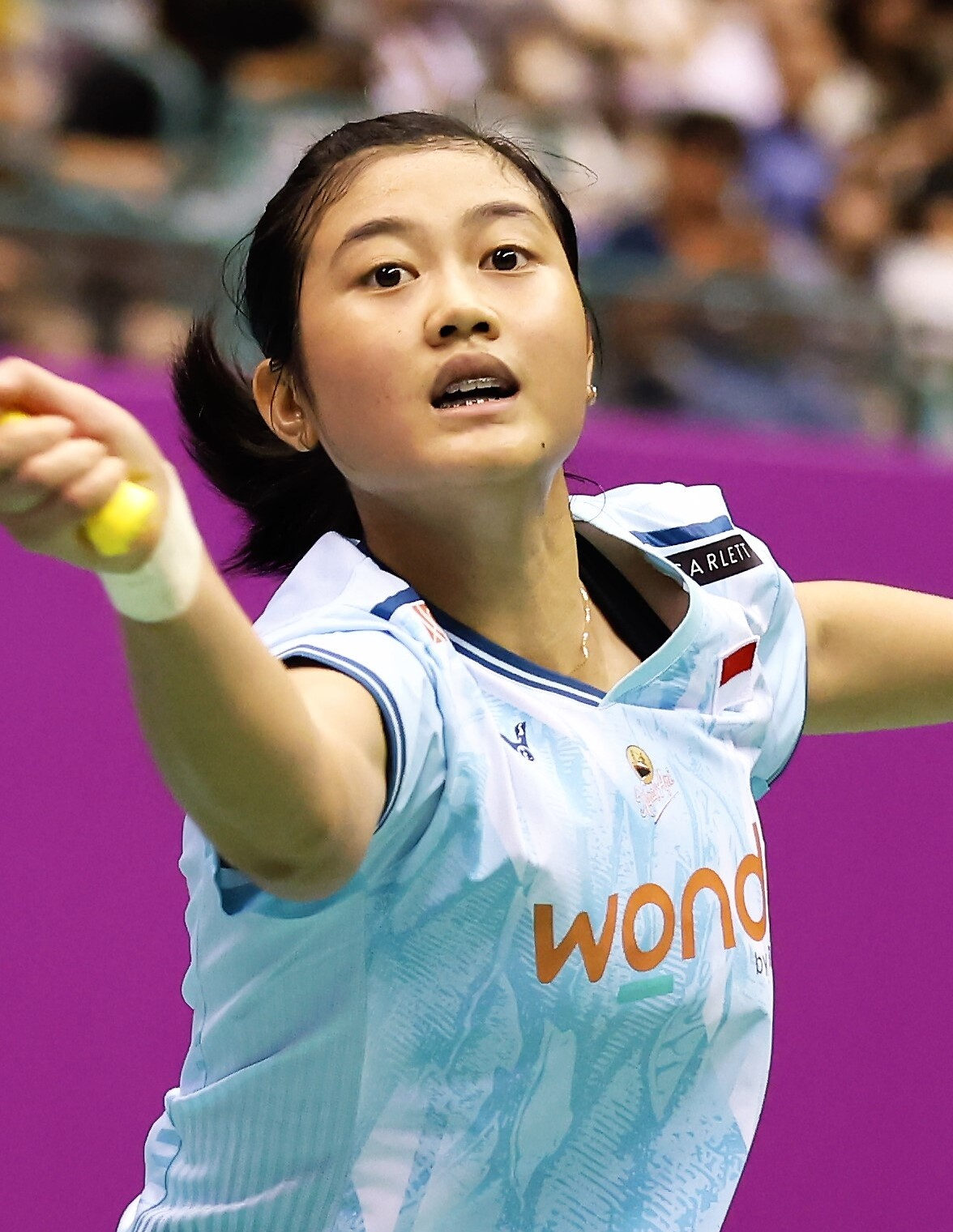
- Pratiwi at the 2024 Taipei Open

Personal information
- Born: 14 October 2001 (age 25) Sukoharjo, Central Java, Indonesia
- Height: 1.70 m (5 ft 7 in)

Sport
- Country: Indonesia
- Sport: Badminton
- Handedness: Right

Women's doubles
- Highest ranking: 8 (with Febriana Dwipuji Kusuma, 14 January 2025); 8 (with Siti Fadia Silva Ramadhanti, 3 November 2026)
- Current ranking: 8 (with Siti Fadia Silva Ramadhanti, 3 November 2026)
- BWF profile
Medal record
Women's badminton
Representing Indonesia
Sudirman Cup
| Bronze medal – third place | 2025 Xiamen | Mixed team |
Uber Cup
| Bronze medal – third place | 2026 Horsens | Women's team |
Asian Championships
| Bronze medal – third place | 2026 Ningbo | Women's doubles |
Asia Team Championships
| Gold medal – first place | 2022 Selangor | Women's team |
| Bronze medal – third place | 2024 Selangor | Women's team |
| Bronze medal – third place | 2026 Qingdao | Women's team |
SEA Games
| Gold medal – first place | 2023 Cambodia | Women's doubles |
| Silver medal – second place | 2023 Cambodia | Women's team |
World Junior Championships
| Gold medal – first place | 2019 Kazan | Mixed team |
| Silver medal – second place | 2019 Kazan | Girls' doubles |
Asian Junior Championships
| Silver medal – second place | 2019 Suzhou | Mixed team |

Amallia Cahaya Pratiwi (born 14 October 2001) is an Indonesian badminton player affiliated with Mutiara Cardinal Bandung club. She was part of the national junior team that won the first Suhandinata Cup for Indonesia in 2019 BWF World Junior Championships. She also featured in the Indonesian women's winning team at the 2022 Asia Team Championships.

== Career ==
=== 2022 ===
In September, Pratiwi with her partner Febriana Dwipuji Kusuma competed at the Japan Open, but lost in the quarter-finals against eventual winner Korean pair Jeong Na-eun and Kim Hye-jeong.

In October 2022, Pratiwi competed at the Vietnam Open as 2nd seed, but lost in the final from 1st seed Thai pair Benyapa Aimsaard and Nuntakarn Aimsaard.

=== 2023 ===
In January, Pratiwi with her partner Febriana Dwipuji Kusuma lost in the second round of Malaysia Open from first seed Chinese pair Chen Qingchen and Jia Yifan. They competed at the home tournament, Indonesia Masters, but had to lose in the first round from Chinese pair Li Wenmei and Liu Xuanxuan in a dramatic match. In the next tournament, they lost in the second round of the Thailand Masters from youngster Chinese pair Li Yijing and Luo Xumin who started from qualification.

In March, Pratiwi and Kusuma competed in the Swiss Open but had to lose in the second round from Japanese pair Rena Miyaura and Ayako Sakuramoto. In the next tour, they competed in the Spain Masters, but had to lose in the second round from Chinese younster pair Liu Shengshu and Tan Ning.

In April, Pratiwi and Kusuma competed at the Orléans Masters in France as top seeds, but had to lose in the quarter-finals from fellow Indonesian pair Lanny Tria Mayasari and Ribka Sugiarto. In late April, she competed at the Asian Championships in Dubai, United Arab Emirates, but had to lose in the quarter-finals from Thai pair Jongkolphan Kititharakul and Rawinda Prajongjai.

In May, Pratiwi made her debut at the SEA Games, and took the silver medal in the women's team, and later clinched the women's doubles gold medal with her partner Kusuma. In late May, Pratiwi competed in the second Asian tour at the Malaysia Masters, but had to lose in the first round from Korean pair Lee Yu-lim and Shin Seung-chan in straight games. In the following week, she were lost at the first round of the Thailand Open from the same Korean pair Lee Yu-lim and Shin Seung-chan in three games.

In June, Pratiwi competed at the Singapore Open, but had to lose in the second round from 7th seed Japanese pair Mayu Matsumoto and Wakana Nagahara in three games. In the next tour, she competed at the home tournament, Indonesia Open, but lost in the second round again from 1st seed Chinese pair Chen Qingchen and Jia Yifan in straight games. In late June, she competed at the Taipei Open as 1st seed, but lost in the final from 5th seed Korean pair Lee Yu-lim and Shin Seung-chan for the thrice time.

In late July, Pratiwi competed at the Japan Open, but lost in the quarter-finals against 4th seed Korean pair Kim So-yeong and Kong Hee-yong.

In early August, Pratiwi competed at the Australian Open, but had to lose in the second round from Japanese pair Rena Miyaura and Ayako Sakuramoto in straight games. In late August, she competed at the World Championships, but lost in the third round from 8th seed Thai pair Jongkolphan Kititharakul and Rawinda Prajongjai in rubber games. She made her debut at the Asian Games in 2022 Hangzhou, but did not obtained a medals in the women's doubles and team events.

== Achievements ==
=== Asian Championships ===
Women's doubles
| Year | Venue | Partner | Opponent | Score | Result | Ref. |
|---|---|---|---|---|---|---|
| 2026 | Ningbo Olympic Sports Center Gymnasium; Ningbo, China | (Indonesia) Siti Fadia Silva Ramadhanti | (China) Liu Shengshu (China) Tan Ning | 10–21, 12–21 | Bronze | |

=== SEA Games ===
Women's doubles
| Year | Venue | Partner | Opponent | Score | Result | Ref. |
|---|---|---|---|---|---|---|
| 2023 | Morodok Techo Badminton Hall; Phnom Penh, Cambodia | (Indonesia) Febriana Dwipuji Kusuma | (Indonesia) Meilysa Trias Puspita Sari (Indonesia) Rachel Allessya Rose | 21–17, 21–16 | Gold | |

=== BWF World Junior Championships ===
Girls' doubles
| Year | Venue | Partner | Opponent | Score | Result | Ref. |
|---|---|---|---|---|---|---|
| 2019 | Kazan Gymnastics Center; Kazan, Russia | (Indonesia) Febriana Dwipuji Kusuma | (China) Lin Fangling (China) Zhou Xinru | 20–22, 21–11, 14–21 | Silver | |

=== BWF World Tour (4 titles, 4 runners-up) ===
The BWF World Tour, which was announced on 19 March 2017 and implemented in 2018, is a series of elite badminton tournaments sanctioned by the Badminton World Federation (BWF). The BWF World Tour is divided into levels of World Tour Finals, Super 1000, Super 750, Super 500, Super 300 (part of the HSBC World Tour), and the BWF Tour Super 100.

Women's doubles
| Year | Tournament | Level | Partner | Opponent | Score | Result | Ref. |
|---|---|---|---|---|---|---|---|
| 2022 | Vietnam Open | Super 100 | (Indonesia) Febriana Dwipuji Kusuma | (Thailand) Benyapa Aimsaard (Thailand) Nuntakarn Aimsaard | 16–21, 25–27 | (silver) Runner-up | |
| 2023 | Taipei Open | Super 300 | (Indonesia) Febriana Dwipuji Kusuma | (South Korea) Lee Yu-lim (South Korea) Shin Seung-chan | 21–18, 17–21, 17–21 | (silver) Runner-up | |
| 2024 | Spain Masters | Super 300 | (Indonesia) Febriana Dwipuji Kusuma | (Japan) Rin Iwanaga (Japan) Kie Nakanishi | 21–12, 8–21, 16–21 | (silver) Runner-up | |
| 2024 | Thailand Open | Super 500 | (Indonesia) Febriana Dwipuji Kusuma | (Thailand) Jongkolphan Kititharakul (Thailand) Rawinda Prajongjai | 14–21, 14–21 | (silver) Runner-up | |
| 2024 | Australian Open | Super 500 | (Indonesia) Febriana Dwipuji Kusuma | (Malaysia) Lai Pei Jing (Malaysia) Lim Chiew Sien | 12–21, 21–7, 21–13 | (gold) Winner | |
| 2024 | Taipei Open | Super 300 | (Indonesia) Febriana Dwipuji Kusuma | (Indonesia) Jesita Putri Miantoro (Indonesia) Febi Setianingrum | 21–15, 21–16 | (gold) Winner | |
| 2026 | Thailand Masters | Super 300 | (Indonesia) Siti Fadia Silva Ramadhanti | (China) Bao Lijing (China) Li Yijing | 15–21, 21–15, 21–18 | (gold) Winner | |
| 2026 | Hylo Open | Super 500 | (Indonesia) Siti Fadia Silva Ramadhanti | (Chinese Taipei) Hsu Yin-hui (Chinese Taipei) Lin Jhih-yun | 21–18, 21–19 | (gold) Winner | |

=== BWF International Challenge/Series (1 runner-up) ===
Women's doubles
| Year | Tournament | Partner | Opponent | Score | Result | Ref. |
|---|---|---|---|---|---|---|
| 2025 | Astana International | (Indonesia) Lanny Tria Mayasari | (Ukraine) Polina Buhrova (Ukraine) Yevheniia Kantemyr | 12–21, 21–11, 13–21 | (silver) Runner-up | |

BWF International Challenge tournament
BWF International Series tournament
BWF Future Series tournament

=== BWF Junior International (2 titles) ===
Girls' doubles
| Year | Tournament | Partner | Opponent | Score | Result | Ref. |
|---|---|---|---|---|---|---|
| 2019 | Jakarta Junior International | (Indonesia) Febriana Dwipuji Kusuma | (Indonesia) Melanni Mamahit (Indonesia) Tryola Nadia | 21–15, 21–16 | (gold) Winner | |
| 2019 | Malaysia Junior International | (Indonesia) Febriana Dwipuji Kusuma | (Indonesia) Helena Ayu Puspitasari (Indonesia) Aldira Rizki Putri | 22–20, 21–12 | (gold) Winner | |

BWF Junior International Grand Prix tournament
BWF Junior International Challenge tournament
BWF Junior International Series tournament
BWF Junior Future Series tournament

== Performance timeline ==
Key

| W | Won | F | Finalist | SF | Semi-finalist |
| QF | Quarter-finalist | #R | Rounds 4, 3, 2, 1 | RR | Round-robin stage |
| Q# | Qualification round | A | Absent | w/d | Withdrew |
| G | Gold | S | Silver | B | Bronze |
| NH | Not held | N/A | Not applicable | DNQ | Did not qualify |

=== National team ===
- Junior level

| Event | 2019 | Ref |
|---|---|---|
| Asian Junior Championships | S | |
| World Junior Championships | G | |

- Senior level

| Team events | 2022 | 2023 | 2024 | 2025 | 2026 | Ref |
|---|---|---|---|---|---|---|
| SEA Games | NH | S | NH | A | NH | |
| Asia Team Championships | G | NH | B | NH | B | |
| Asian Games | QF | NH | | | | |
| Uber Cup | QF | NH | A | NH | B | |
| Sudirman Cup | NH | A | NH | B | NH | |

=== Individual competitions ===
==== Junior level ====
- Girls' doubles

| Event | 2019 |
|---|---|
| Asian Junior Championships | 2R |
| World Junior Championships | S |

==== Senior level ====
- Women's doubles

| Event | 2022 | 2023 | 2024 | 2025 | 2026 | Ref |
|---|---|---|---|---|---|---|
| SEA Games | NH | G | NH | A | NH | |
| Asian Championships | 1R | QF | w/d | QF | B | |
| Asian Games | 2R | NH | | | | |
| World Championships | 1R | 3R | NH | QF | DNQ | |

| Tournament | BWF World Tour | | | | | | | | Best | Ref |
| Tournament | 2019 | 2020 | 2021 | 2022 | 2023 | 2024 | 2025 | 2026 | Best | Ref |
|---|---|---|---|---|---|---|---|---|---|---|
| Malaysia Open | A | NH | | 2R | 2R | A | 1R | A | 2R ('22, '23) | |
| India Open | A | NH | | A | | | | 1R | 1R ('26) | |
| Indonesia Masters | Q2 | A | 1R | 1R | 1R | 1R | QF | QF | QF ('25, '26) | |
| Thailand Masters | A | | NH | | 2R | SF | 1R | W | W ('26) | |
| German Open | A | NH | | A | | | | SF | SF ('26) | |
| All England Open | A | | | | | | 2R | 2R | 2R ('25, '26) | |
| Swiss Open | A | NH | A | | 2R | 2R | SF | 2R | SF ('25) | |
| Orléans Masters | A | NH | w/d | A | QF | 2R | A | | QF ('23) | |
| Thailand Open | A | | NH | 1R | 1R | F | QF | A | F ('24) | |
| Malaysia Masters | A | | NH | 2R | 1R | 2R | QF | A | QF ('25) | |
| Singapore Open | A | NH | | QF | 2R | A | | 1R | QF ('22) | |
| Indonesia Open | A | NH | QF | 2R | 2R | 1R | QF | QF | QF ('21, '25, '26) | |
| Australian Open | A | NH | | 2R | 2R | W | 2R | A | W ('24) | |
| Macau Open | A | NH | | | | A | | SF | SF ('26) | |
| Japan Open | A | NH | | QF | QF | A | 2R | 1R | QF ('22, '23) | |
| China Open | A | NH | | | 1R | A | 2R | 1R | 2R ('25) | |
| Taipei Open | A | NH | | w/d | F | W | A | w/d | W ('24) | |
| Korea Masters | A | NH | | A | | SF | A | | SF ('24) | |
| China Masters | A | NH | | | w/d | QF | 1R | A | QF ('24) | |
| Vietnam Open | A | NH | | F | A | | | | F ('22) | |
| Arctic Open | N/A | NH | | | A | | 1R | A | 1R ('25) | |
| Denmark Open | A | | | 1R | QF | A | 1R | 1R | QF ('23) | |
| French Open | A | NH | A | 2R | 1R | A | 2R | QF | QF ('26) | |
| Hylo Open | A | | | 1R | 2R | A | | W | W ('26) | |
| Japan Masters | NH | | | | 1R | 2R | A | QF | QF ('26) | |
| Hong Kong Open | A | NH | | | 1R | QF | 2R | SF | SF ('26) | |
| Odisha Masters | NH | | | A | | | QF | A | QF ('25) | |
| World Tour Finals | DNQ | | | | | RR | DNQ | Q | RR ('24) | |
| Spain Masters | A | | 1R | NH | 2R | F | NH | | F ('24) | |
| Year-end ranking | 409 | 396 | 117 | 22 | 17 | 9 | 10 | | 8 | |
| Tournament | 2019 | 2020 | 2021 | 2022 | 2023 | 2024 | 2025 | 2026 | Best | Ref |
