= 2019 BWF World Junior Championships – Girls' doubles =

2019 BWF World Junior Championships Girls' Doubles
Tournament details
- Dates: 7 – 13 October 2019
- Edition: 21st
- Level: International
- Venue: Kazan Gymnastics Center
- Location: Kazan, Russia

The girls' doubles of the tournament 2019 BWF World Junior Championships will be held from 7 to 13 October 2019. The defending champions is Liu Xuanxuan/Xia Yuting from China.

== Seeds ==
Click on the seed number of a player to go to their draw section.

1. (Indonesia) Nita Violina Marwah / Putri Syaikah (quarterfinals)
2. (China) Li Yijing / Luo Xumin (semifinals)
3. (Indonesia) Febriana Dwipuji Kusuma / Amalia Cahaya Pratiwi (final)
4. (China) Lin Fangling / Zhou Xinru (champions)
5. (Thailand) Pornpicha Choeikeewong / Pornnicha Suwatnodom (third round)
6. (Denmark) Christine Busch / Amalie Schulz (quarterfinals)
7. (Indonesia) Melani Mamahit / Tryola Nadia (quarterfinals)
8. (Turkey) Bengisu Erçetin / Zehra Erdem (second round)

9. (Switzerland) Dounia Pelupessy / Milena Schnider (second round)
10. (Germany) Leona Michalski / Emma Moszczynski (fourth round)
11. (England) Asmita Chaudhari / Annie Lado (second round)
12. (India) Aditi Bhatt / Tanisha Crasto (fourth round)
13. (Japan) Kaho Osawa / Hinata Suzuki (semifinals)
14. (Switzerland) Julie Franconville / Caroline Racloz (third round)
15. (Russia) Anastasiia Kurdyukova / Anastasiia Shapovalova (third round)
16. (Czech Republic) Lucie Krpatová / Kateřina Zuzáková (second round)

== Draw ==
=== Finals ===
Quarterfinals
1 | (Indonesia) Nita Violina Marwah (Indonesia) Putri Syaikah | 16 | 19
13 | (Japan) Kaho Osawa (Japan) Hinata Suzuki | 21 | 21
4 | (China) Lin Fangling (China) Zhou Xinru | 18 | 21 | 21
6 | (Denmark) Christine Busch (Denmark) Amalie Schulz | 21 | 13 | 15
(Japan) Atsumi Miyazaki (Japan) Chihiro Uchiyama | 22 | 21 | 17
3 | (Indonesia) Febriana Dwipuji Kusuma (Indonesia) Amalia Cahaya Pratiwi | 24 | 17 | 21
7 | (Indonesia) Melani Mamahit (Indonesia) Tryola Nadia | 13 | 13
2 | (China) Li Yijing (China) Luo Xumin | 21 | 21

Semifinals
13 | (Japan) Kaho Osawa (Japan) Hinata Suzuki | 7 | 21 | 17
4 | (China) Lin Fangling (China) Zhou Xinru | 21 | 16 | 21
3 | (Indonesia) Febriana Dwipuji Kusuma (Indonesia) Amalia Cahaya Pratiwi | 21 | 23
2 | (China) Li Yijing (China) Luo Xumin | 17 | 21

Finals
4 | (China) Lin Fangling (China) Zhou Xinru | 22 | 11 | 21
3 | (Indonesia) Febriana Dwipuji Kusuma (Indonesia) Amalia Cahaya Pratiwi | 20 | 21 | 14

=== Top half ===
==== Section 1 ====
First Round
(Armenia) G Mamajanyan (Armenia) E Tiraturyan | 15 | 13
(New Zealand) E Smith (New Zealand) J Zhu | 21 | 21
(Portugal) A Fernandes (Portugal) C Lourenço | 6 | 10
(Chinese Taipei) Chiang Y-h (Chinese Taipei) Sun W-p | 21 | 21

Second Round
1 | (Indonesia) N V Marwah (Indonesia) P Syaikah | 21 | 21
(Spain) F Albin (Spain) E Lorenzo | 6 | 13
(Sri Lanka) D Dias (Sri Lanka) A Masakorala | 21 | 21
(New Zealand) E Smith (New Zealand) J Zhu | 10 | 9
16 | (Czech Republic) L Krpatová (Czech Republic) K Zuzáková | 16 | 18
(Russia) A Boiarun (Russia) A Iakovleva | 21 | 21
(Kazakhstan) D Chotonova (Kazakhstan) N Rakhmetullayeva | 5 | 9
(Chinese Taipei) Chiang Y-h (Chinese Taipei) Sun W-p | 21 | 21

Third Round
1 | (Indonesia) N V Marwah (Indonesia) P Syaikah | 21 | 21
(Sri Lanka) D Dias (Sri Lanka) A Masakorala | 6 | 15
(Russia) A Boiarun (Russia) A Iakovleva | 21 | 22
(Chinese Taipei) Chiang Y-h (Chinese Taipei) Sun W-p | 19 | 20

Fourth Round
1 | (Indonesia) N V Marwah (Indonesia) P Syaikah | 21 | 21
(Russia) A Boiarun (Russia) A Iakovleva | 13 | 16

==== Section 2 ====
First Round
(Malaysia) Gan J E (Malaysia) Tan Z Y | 13 | 21 | 21
(Estonia) C Kruus (Estonia) R Üprus | 21 | 16 | 14
(Sweden) E Urell (Sweden) C Wang | 21 | 21
(Uganda) H Kobugabe (Uganda) T Neluwooza | 11 | 9

Second Round
5 | (Thailand) P Choeikeewong (Thailand) P Suwatnodom | 19 | 21 | 21
(India) T Jolly (India) V V Sri | 21 | 12 | 17
(China) Chen YX (China) Zhang C | 21 | 21
(Malaysia) Gan J E (Malaysia) Tan Z Y | 13 | 16
13 | (Japan) K Osawa (Japan) H Suzuki | 21 | 21
(England) A Harris (England) H Warner | 14 | 12
(Italy) M Corsini (Italy) C Passeri | 21 | 19 | 12
(Sweden) E Urell (Sweden) C Wang | 18 | 21 | 21

Third Round
5 | (Thailand) P Choeikeewong (Thailand) P Suwatnodom | 16 | 16
(China) Chen YX (China) Zhang C | 21 | 21
13 | (Japan) K Osawa (Japan) H Suzuki | 21 | 21
(Sweden) E Urell (Sweden) C Wang | 7 | 19

Fourth Round
(China) Chen YX (China) Zhang C | 19 | 17
13 | (Japan) K Osawa (Japan) H Suzuki | 21 | 21

==== Section 3 ====
First Round
(Hong Kong) Lui L L (Hong Kong) Tsang H Y | 21 | 21
(Norway) A Hong (Norway) M Mørk | 5 | 9
(Canada) C Choi (Canada) T Ng | 21 | 24
(South Korea) Kim Y-j (South Korea) Lee N-r | 18 | 22

Second Round
4 | (China) Lin FL (China) Zhou XR | 21 | 21
(Finland) J Kelavuori (Finland) N Nokkala | 5 | 4
(India) S Mishra (India) S Singh | 13 | 14
(Hong Kong) Lui L L (Hong Kong) Tsang H Y | 21 | 21
14 | (Switzerland) J Franconville (Switzerland) C Racloz | 21 | 21
(Singapore) J Koh (Singapore) M Lee | 11 | 15
(Scotland) A Campbell (Scotland) R Sugden | 15 | 8
(Canada) C Choi (Canada) T Ng | 21 | 21

Third Round
4 | (China) Lin FL (China) Zhou XR | 21 | 22
(Hong Kong) Lui L L (Hong Kong) Tsang H Y | 16 | 20
14 | (Switzerland) J Franconville (Switzerland) C Racloz | 15 | 11
(Canada) C Choi (Canada) T Ng | 21 | 21

Fourth Round
4 | (China) Lin FL (China) Zhou XR | 21 | 21
(Canada) C Choi (Canada) T Ng | 11 | 18

==== Section 4 ====
First Round
(Chinese Taipei) Hung E-t (Chinese Taipei) Tsai H-p | 21 | 21
(France) J Moinard (France) F Vallet | 17 | 17
(Australia) V He (Australia) B Teoh K Q | 21 | 21
(Latvia) A Azarova (Latvia) D Stognija | 9 | 13

Second Round
6 | (Denmark) C Busch (Denmark) A Schulz | 21 | 21
(United States) J Fan (United States) K Lee T | 14 | 5
(Belarus) H Bandarenka (Belarus) V Tarusava | 10 | 13
(Chinese Taipei) Hung E-t (Chinese Taipei) Tsai H-p | 21 | 21
10 | (Germany) L Michalski (Germany) E Moszczynski | 21 | 21
(Macau) Chio W U (Macau) Pui C W | 10 | 12
(Uzbekistan) G Bokieva (Uzbekistan) S Sodikova | 21 | 22
(Australia) V He (Australia) B Teoh K Q | 15 | 20

Third Round
6 | (Denmark) C Busch (Denmark) A Schulz | 21 | 16 | 21
(Chinese Taipei) Hung E-t (Chinese Taipei) Tsai H-p | 16 | 21 | 16
10 | (Germany) L Michalski (Germany) E Moszczynski | 21 | 21
(Uzbekistan) G Bokieva (Uzbekistan) S Sodikova | 9 | 5

Fourth Round
6 | (Denmark) C Busch (Denmark) A Schulz | 20 | 22 | 21
10 | (Germany) L Michalski (Germany) E Moszczynski | 22 | 20 | 13

=== Bottom half ===
==== Section 5 ====
First Round
(Slovakia) M Tarcalova (Slovakia) L Vojtekova | 10 | 9
(Chinese Taipei) Jiang P-y (Chinese Taipei) Ting Y-y | 21 | 21
(Netherlands) K van Buiten (Netherlands) M Versteeg | 6 | 14
(Spain) L Rodriguez (Spain) A Setien | 21 | 21
(Japan) A Miyazaki (Japan) C Uchiyama | 21 | 21
(Portugal) M Afonso (Portugal) M Neves | 5 | 7

Second Round
(Chinese Taipei) Jiang P-y (Chinese Taipei) Ting Y-y | 21 | 21
(Spain) L Rodriguez (Spain) A Setien | 14 | 19
(Iceland) J K Johannsdottir (Iceland) K Prus | 6 | 5
12 | (India) A Bhatt (India) T Crasto | 21 | 21
(Japan) A Miyazaki (Japan) C Uchiyama | 21 | 21
(Scotland) R Andrew (Scotland) R Cameron | 16 | 6
(Canada) C Lai (Canada) WY Zhang | 21 | 21
8 | (Turkey) B Erçetin (Turkey) Z Erdem | 18 | 19

Third Round
(Chinese Taipei) Jiang P-y (Chinese Taipei) Ting Y-y | 17 | 11
12 | (India) A Bhatt (India) T Crasto | 21 | 21
(Japan) A Miyazaki (Japan) C Uchiyama | 21 | 21
(Canada) C Lai (Canada) WY Zhang | 12 | 18

Fourth Round
12 | (India) A Bhatt (India) T Crasto | 11 | 14
(Japan) A Miyazaki (Japan) C Uchiyama | 21 | 21

==== Section 6 ====
First Round
(Hong Kong) Leung S L (Hong Kong) Yeung P L | 21 | 21
(Peru) M Castillo (Peru) F Saponara | 7 | 12
(South Korea) Jeong D-y (South Korea) Kim A-l | 21 | 22 | 21
(Norway) S Macsali (Norway) E P Norberg | 11 | 24 | 18

Second Round
(Hong Kong) Leung S L (Hong Kong) Yeung P L | 21 | 21
(France) L Jaffrennou (France) E Vercelot | 18 | 7
(Malaysia) Go P K (Malaysia) Teoh L X | 21 | 21
9 | (Switzerland) H Pelupessy (Switzerland) M Schnider | 11 | 11
(South Korea) Jeong D-y (South Korea) Kim A-l | 21 | 21
(New Zealand) J Jiang (New Zealand) C Rozario | 11 | 18
(Denmark) S Grundtvig (Denmark) A C Kudsk | 11 | 14
3 | (Indonesia) F D Kusuma (Indonesia) A C Pratiwi | 21 | 21

Third Round
(Hong Kong) Leung S L (Hong Kong) Yeung P L | 21 | 21
(Malaysia) Go P K (Malaysia) Teoh L X | 6 | 12
(South Korea) Jeong D-y (South Korea) Kim A-l | 9 | 11
3 | (Indonesia) F D Kusuma (Indonesia) A C Pratiwi | 21 | 21

Fourth Round
(Hong Kong) Leung S L (Hong Kong) Yeung P L | 17 | 10
3 | (Indonesia) F D Kusuma (Indonesia) A C Pratiwi | 21 | 21

==== Section 7 ====
First Round
(Mongolia) K Darkhanbaatar (Mongolia) M Lkhagvasuren | 2 | 6
(Malaysia) Low Y Y (Malaysia) V Siow | 21 | 21
(Hungary) P Meszaros (Czech Republic) K Mikelová | 21 | 21
(Kazakhstan) V Li-Zhe-Yu (Kazakhstan) D Moiseenko | 11 | 13

Second Round
(Malaysia) Low Y Y (Malaysia) V Siow | 21 | 21
(Uzbekistan) M Ganieva (Uzbekistan) K Ollaberganova | 6 | 9
(Finland) J Salonen (Finland) T Vasikkaniemi | 11 | 4
15 | (Russia) A Kurdyukova (Russia) A Shapovalova | 21 | 21
(Hungary) P Meszaros (Czech Republic) K Mikelová | 21 | 21
(Latvia) A Kupča (Latvia) A Rulle-Titava | 12 | 16
(South Korea) Choi H-w (South Korea) Seo B-h | 18 | 11
7 | (Indonesia) M Mamahit (Indonesia) T Nadia | 21 | 21

Third Round
(Malaysia) Low Y Y (Malaysia) V Siow | 21 | 21
15 | (Russia) A Kurdyukova (Russia) A Shapovalova | 12 | 19
(Hungary) P Meszaros (Czech Republic) K Mikelová | 10 | 4
7 | (Indonesia) M Mamahit (Indonesia) T Nadia | 21 | 21

Fourth Round
(Malaysia) Low Y Y (Malaysia) V Siow | 21 | 10 | 14
7 | (Indonesia) M Mamahit (Indonesia) T Nadia | 17 | 21 | 21

==== Section 8 ====
First Round
(Sri Lanka) P Adhikari (Sri Lanka) C Abeywickrama | 7 | 15
(Japan) R Hirokami (Japan) M Otake | 21 | 21
(Australia) K Ea (Australia) A Yu | 21 | 11 | 21
(Hungary) F D Kiss (Hungary) V Sandorhazi | 19 | 21 | 17

Second Round
(Japan) R Hirokami (Japan) M Otake | 21 | 21
(Lithuania) S Golubickaite (Lithuania) G Mockute | 2 | 10
(United States) N Chi (United States) K Ngo | 21 | 23
11 | (England) A Chaudhari (England) A Lado | 19 | 21
(Australia) K Ea (Australia) A Yu | 11 | 14
(Thailand) P Phatcharaphisutsin (Thailand) P Ungka | 21 | 21
(Denmark) N P. Anthonisen (Denmark) C Graversen | 15 | 11
2 | (China) Li YJ (China) Luo XM | 21 | 21

Third Round
(Japan) R Hirokami (Japan) M Otake | 21 | 21
(United States) N Chi (United States) K Ngo | 8 | 10
(Thailand) P Phatcharaphisutsin (Thailand) P Ungka | 10 | 11
2 | (China) Li YJ (China) Luo XM | 21 | 21

Fourth Round
(Japan) R Hirokami (Japan) M Otake | 22 | 19
2 | (China) Li YJ (China) Luo XM | 24 | 21
