= 2024 Australian Open (badminton) =

2024 badminton tournament in Sydney

Tournament details
- Dates: 11–16 June
- Edition: 33rd
- Level: Super 500
- Total prize money: US$420,000
- Venue: State Sports Centre
- Location: Sydney, Australia

Champions
- Men's singles: (Malaysia) Lee Zii Jia
- Women's singles: (Japan) Aya Ohori
- Men's doubles: (China) He Jiting (China) Ren Xiangyu
- Women's doubles: (Indonesia) Febriana Dwipuji Kusuma (Indonesia) Amallia Cahaya Pratiwi
- Mixed doubles: (China) Jiang Zhenbang (China) Wei Yaxin

The 2024 Australian Open (officially known as the Sathio Group Australian Open 2024 for sponsorship reasons) was a badminton tournament which took place at the State Sports Centre in Sydney, Australia, from 11 to 16 June 2024 and had a total prize of US$ 420,000.

== Tournament ==
The 2024 Australian Open was the sixteenth tournament in the 2024 BWF World Tour. It was a part of the Australian Open, which had been held since 1975. This tournament was organized by Badminton Australia with sanction from the BWF.

=== Venue ===
This international tournament was held at the State Sports Centre in Sydney, Australia.

=== Point distribution ===
Below is the point distribution table for each phase of the tournament based on the BWF points system for the BWF World Tour Super 500 event.

Winner	Runner-up	3/4	5/8	9/16	17/32	33/64	65/128
9,200	7,800	6,420	5,040	3,600	2,220	880	430

=== Prize money ===
The total prize money for this tournament was US$420,000. The distribution of the prize money will be in accordance with BWF regulations.

Event	Winner	Finalist	Semi-finals	Quarter-finals	Last 16
Singles	$31,500	$15,960	$6,090	$2,520	$1470
Doubles	$33,180	$15,960	$5,880	$3,045	$1575

== Men's singles ==
=== Seeds ===
1. (Indonesia) Jonatan Christie (withdrew)
2. (Japan) Kodai Naraoka (final)
3. (Malaysia) Lee Zii Jia (champion)
4. (Indonesia) Anthony Sinisuka Ginting (withdrew)
5. (India) Prannoy H. S. (quarter-finals)
6. (Chinese Taipei) Chou Tien-chen (quarter-finals)
7. (Japan) Kenta Nishimoto (quarter-finals)
8. (Singapore) Loh Kean Yew (second round)

=== Finals ===
Semi-finals
3	(Malaysia) Lee Zii Jia	10	21	21
(Chinese Taipei) Lee Chia-hao	21	15	10
(Chinese Taipei) Lin Chun-yi	20	21
2	(Japan) Kodai Naraoka	22	23

Final
3	(Malaysia) Lee Zii Jia	21	11	21
2	(Japan) Kodai Naraoka	19	21	18

=== Top half ===
==== Section 1 ====
First round
3	(Malaysia) Lee Z J	21	18	21
(India) S Subramanian	16	21	10
(Canada) V Lai	12	16
(Malaysia) Soong J V	21	21
7	(Japan) K Nishimoto	21	21
PFQ	(United States) E Ascunsion	10	12
(Canada) X Sheng	17	10
(India) K George	21	21

Second round
3	(Malaysia) Lee Z J	21	21
(Malaysia) Soong J V	18	14
7	(Japan) K Nishimoto	22	21
(India) K George	20	6

Quarter-finals
3	(Malaysia) Lee Z J	16	21	21
7	(Japan) K Nishimoto	21	12	12

==== Section 2 ====
First round
6	(Chinese Taipei) Chou T-c	21	21
(India) R Mariswamy	6	8
(Chinese Taipei) Chi Y-j	21	21
(Vietnam) Nguyễn H Đ	11	11
(Indonesia) C A Dwi Wardoyo	21	21
Q4	(Australia) J Yu	19	11
(Chinese Taipei) Lee C-h	21	21
Q3	(New Zealand) E Lau	9	13

Second round
6	(Chinese Taipei) Chou T-c	12	21	21
(Chinese Taipei) Chi Y-j	21	14	15
(Indonesia) C A Dwi Wardoyo	19	11
(Chinese Taipei) Lee C-h	21	21

Quarter-finals
6	(Chinese Taipei) Chou T-c	20	20
(Chinese Taipei) Lee C-h	22	22

=== Bottom half ===
==== Section 3 ====
First round
(Indonesia) A Farhan	21	21
(India) M Manjunath	17	17
(India) Ravi	6	13
(Chinese Taipei) Lin C-y	21	21
(India) S Verma	21	21
PFQ	(Australia) R Tang	10	10
(Finland) K Koljonen	15	13
8	(Singapore) Loh K Y	21	21

Second round
(Indonesia) A Farhan	17	22	23
(Chinese Taipei) Lin C-y	21	20	25
(India) S Verma	21	14	21
8	(Singapore) Loh K Y	14	21	19

Quarter-finals
(Chinese Taipei) Lin C-y	21	21
(India) S Verma	12	13

==== Section 4 ====
First round
Q1	(India) A Yeligar	9	15
(Israel) M Zilberman	21	21
(Brazil) Y Coelho	10	21
5	(India) Prannoy H. S.	21	23
(Thailand) K Wangcharoen	21	21
(Vietnam) Lê Đ P	14	10
Q2	(Australia) Karono	10	8
2	(Japan) K Naraoka	21	21

Second round
(Israel) M Zilberman	17	15
5	(India) Prannoy H. S.	21	21
(Thailand) K Wangcharoen	17	18
2	(Japan) K Naraoka	21	21

Quarter-finals
5	(India) Prannoy H. S.	19	13
2	(Japan) K Naraoka	21	21

== Women's singles ==
=== Seeds ===
1. (Japan) Akane Yamaguchi (withdrew)
2. (Japan) Aya Ohori (champion)
3. (Chinese Taipei) Pai Yu-po (semi-finals)
4. (Germany) Yvonne Li (first round)
5. (Chinese Taipei) Sung Shuo-yun (semi-finals)
6. (Indonesia) Putri Kusuma Wardani (quarter-finals)
7. (Indonesia) Ester Nurumi Tri Wardoyo (final)
8. (India) Aakarshi Kashyap (quarter-finals)

=== Finals ===
Semi-finals
3	(Chinese Taipei) Pai Yu-po	15	16
7	(Indonesia) Ester Nurumi Tri Wardoyo	21	21
5	(Chinese Taipei) Sung Shuo-yun	4	8^{r}
2	(Japan) Aya Ohori	21	11

Final
7	(Indonesia) Ester Nurumi Tri Wardoyo	21	19	16
2	(Japan) Aya Ohori	17	21	21

=== Top half ===
==== Section 1 ====
First round
3	(Chinese Taipei) Pai Y-p	21	21	24
(India) Samiya I F	23	13	22
(Malaysia) Letshanaa K	21	21
Q1	(Australia) I S Acharya	6	5
8	(India) A Kashyap	21	21
(Ukraine) P Buhrova	14	11
(Australia) K Q Teoh	21	21
Q4	(Australia) YL Zhang	15	13

Second round
3	(Chinese Taipei) Pai Y-p	21	21
(Malaysia) Letshanaa K	14	18
8	(India) A Kashyap	21	21
(Australia) K Q Teoh	16	13

Quarter-finals
3	(Chinese Taipei) Pai Y-p	21	21
8	(India) A Kashyap	17	12

==== Section 2 ====
First round
7	(Indonesia) E N T Wardoyo	21	21
(Chinese Taipei) Huang Y-s	9	15
(India) K Mopati	10	8
(India) M Bansod	21	21
(Indonesia) K A C Dewi	21	21
Q3	(Australia) V Tjonadi	10	12
Q2	(Australia) L Ma	10	10
(United States) L Lam	21	21

Second round
7	(Indonesia) E N T Wardoyo	21	23
(India) M Bansod	17	21
(Indonesia) K A C Dewi	21	21
(United States) L Lam	17	13

Quarter-finals
7	(Indonesia) E N T Wardoyo	21	21
(Indonesia) K A C Dewi	18	15

=== Bottom half ===
==== Section 3 ====
First round
(Chinese Taipei) Tung C-t	21	14	21
(Germany) M Wilson	14	21	15
(Chinese Taipei) Chiu P-c	21	17	15
5	(Chinese Taipei) Sung S-y	11	21	21
(Australia) T Ho	21	21
(Australia) S Tjonadi	6	15
PFQ	(Chinese Taipei) Yu C-h	18	21	21
4	(Germany) Y Li	21	17	18

Second round
(Chinese Taipei) Tung C-t	12	17
5	(Chinese Taipei) Sung S-y	21	21
(Australia) T Ho	19	5
PFQ	(Chinese Taipei) Yu C-h	21	21

Quarter-finals
5	(Chinese Taipei) Sung S-y	21	21
PFQ	(Chinese Taipei) Yu C-h	17	18

==== Section 4 ====
First round
(Malaysia) Wong L C	14	21
(India) A Upadhyaya	21	23
(Vietnam) Vũ T A T	13	12
6	(Indonesia) P K Wardani	21	21
PFQ	(Ukraine) Y Kantemyr	20	18
(Peru) I Castillo	22	21
(Chinese Taipei) Lee Y-h	13	4
2	(Japan) A Ohori	21	21

Second round
(India) A Upadhyaya	11	18
6	(Indonesia) P K Wardani	21	21
(Peru) I Castillo	4	8
2	(Japan) A Ohori	21	21

Quarter-finals
6	(Indonesia) P K Wardani	19	13
2	(Japan) A Ohori	21	21

== Men's doubles ==
=== Seeds ===
1. (China) He Jiting / Ren Xiangyu (champions)
2. (Indonesia) Mohammad Ahsan / Hendra Setiawan (final)
3. (Malaysia) Choong Hon Jian / Muhammad Haikal (semi-finals)
4. (Malaysia) Junaidi Arif / Yap Roy King (quarter-finals)
5. (Malaysia) Nur Mohd Azriyn Ayub / Tan Wee Kiong (second round)
6. (Australia) Pramudya Kusumawardana / Andika Ramadiansyah (quarter-finals)
7. (Malaysia) Kang Khai Xing / Aaron Tai (quarter-finals)
8. (Thailand) Pongsakorn Thongkham / Wongsathorn Thongkham (first round)

=== Finals ===
Semi-finals
1	(China) He Jiting (China) Ren Xiangyu	21	21
3	(Malaysia) Choong Hon Jian (Malaysia) Muhammad Haikal	18	9
(Chinese Taipei) Chen Zhi-ray (Chinese Taipei) Lin Yu-chieh	14	21	11
2	(Indonesia) Mohammad Ahsan (Indonesia) Hendra Setiawan	21	17	21

Final
1	(China) He Jiting (China) Ren Xiangyu	21	21
2	(Indonesia) Mohammad Ahsan (Indonesia) Hendra Setiawan	11	10

=== Top half ===
==== Section 1 ====
First round
1	(China) He J T (China) Ren X Y	21	21
Q4	(Australia) K M Chan (Australia) R Rajkumar	9	11
(Australia) A Fang (Australia) M Su	20	20
(Australia) K M Edison (Australia) J Yu	22	22
7	(Malaysia) Kang K X (Malaysia) A Tai	21	21
(Australia) B Wang (Australia) J Wang	10	9
(Australia) K Igawa (Australia) K Richardson	21	21
(Australia) S Aroliveettil (Australia) E Billoso	17	8

Second round
1	(China) He J T (China) Ren X Y	21	21
(Australia) K M Edison (Australia) J Yu	15	12
7	(Malaysia) Kang K X (Malaysia) A Tai	21	21
(Australia) K Igawa (Australia) K Richardson	14	8

Quarter-finals
1	(China) He J T (China) Ren X Y	21	21
7	(Malaysia) Kang K X (Malaysia) A Tai	14	12

==== Section 2 ====
First round
3	(Malaysia) Choong H J (Malaysia) M Haikal	21	21
(Australia) J Yang (Australia) F Zhao	9	11
Q3	(Australia) A Nirmal (Australia) Em Stephen Sam	w	/	o
Q2	(India) R Abhimanyu (India) A Nandal
5	(Malaysia) N M Azriyn Ayub (Malaysia) Tan W K	21	21
(Australia) T Elbert (Australia) H Tang	11	16
(New Zealand) A Jeffrey (New Zealand) D Soedjasa	16	16
(Australia) R Hidayat (Australia) F W Putra	21	21

Second round
3	(Malaysia) Choong H J (Malaysia) M Haikal	21	21
Q3	(Australia) A Nirmal (Australia) Em Stephen Sam	12	8
5	(Malaysia) N M Azriyn Ayub (Malaysia) Tan W K	21	21	19
(Australia) R Hidayat (Australia) F W Putra	14	21	21

Quarter-finals
3	(Malaysia) Choong H J (Malaysia) M Haikal	21	18	21
(Australia) R Hidayat (Australia) F W Putra	16	21	12

=== Bottom half ===
==== Section 3 ====
First round
(Malaysia) K Chok (Malaysia) A Y T Kok	21	21
Q1	(Australia) P S Low (Australia) T Wong	8	12
(Chinese Taipei) Chen Z-r (Chinese Taipei) Lin Y-c	21	21
8	(Thailand) P Thongkham (Thailand) W Thongkham	14	12
(Australia) Ooi Y H (England) S Stallwood	21	21
(Australia) P Halim (Australia) L Kurniawan	11	14
(Australia) H L Chin (Australia) Z Q Fu	8	7
4	(Malaysia) J Arif (Malaysia) Yap R K	21	21

Second round
(Malaysia) K Chok (Malaysia) A Y T Kok	9	8
(Chinese Taipei) Chen Z-r (Chinese Taipei) Lin Y-c	21	21
(Australia) Ooi Y H (England) S Stallwood	10	9
4	(Malaysia) J Arif (Malaysia) Yap R K	21	21

Quarter-finals
(Chinese Taipei) Chen Z-r (Chinese Taipei) Lin Y-c	21	21
4	(Malaysia) J Arif (Malaysia) Yap R K	14	17

==== Section 4 ====
First round
(Australia) A Srinivas (Australia) Ep Stephen Sam	21	15	21
(Australia) B Halim (Australia) F Kurniawan	13	21	15
(Australia) K Choo (Australia) Lim M C	17	12
6	(Australia) P Kusumawardana (Australia) A Ramadiansyah	21	21
(Australia) B L-C Kwok (Australia) M S H Lim	12	11
(Australia) Kuo T-y (South Korea) Lee J-s	21	21
(Australia) L Defolky (Australia) R Tang	14	12
2	(Indonesia) M Ahsan (Indonesia) H Setiawan	21	21

Second round
(Australia) A Srinivas (Australia) Ep Stephen Sam	5	8
6	(Australia) P Kusumawardana (Australia) A Ramadiansyah	21	21
(Australia) Kuo T-y (South Korea) Lee J-s	9	16
2	(Indonesia) M Ahsan (Indonesia) H Setiawan	21	21

Quarter-finals
6	(Australia) P Kusumawardana (Australia) A Ramadiansyah	14	17
2	(Indonesia) M Ahsan (Indonesia) H Setiawan	21	21

== Women's doubles ==
=== Seeds ===
1. (Japan) Nami Matsuyama / Chiharu Shida (withdrew)
2. (Indonesia) Febriana Dwipuji Kusuma / Amallia Cahaya Pratiwi (champions)
3. (Hong Kong) Yeung Nga Ting / Yeung Pui Lam (semi-finals)
4. (Australia) Setyana Mapasa / Angela Yu (semi-finals)
5. (Japan) Rui Hirokami / Yuna Kato (withdrew)
6. (Chinese Taipei) Sung Shuo-yun / Yu Chien-hui (quarter-finals)
7. (India) Rutaparna Panda / Swetaparna Panda (second round)
8. (Denmark) Julie Finne-Ipsen / Mai Surrow (second round)

=== Finals ===
Semi-finals
3	(Hong Kong) Yeung Nga Ting (Hong Kong) Yeung Pui Lam	13	21	14
(Malaysia) Lai Pei Jing (Malaysia) Lim Chiew Sien	21	18	21
4	(Australia) Setyana Mapasa (Australia) Angela Yu	13	7
2	(Indonesia) Febriana Dwipuji Kusuma (Indonesia) Amalia Cahaya Pratiwi	21	21

Final
(Malaysia) Lai Pei Jing (Malaysia) Lim Chiew Sien	21	7	13
2	(Indonesia) Febriana Dwipuji Kusuma (Indonesia) Amalia Cahaya Pratiwi	12	21	21

=== Top half ===
==== Section 1 ====
First round

Second round
3	(Hong Kong) Yeung N T (Hong Kong) Yeung P L	21	21
(Australia) S Kurniawan (Australia) Poon L Y	16	9
8	(Denmark) J F Ipsen (Denmark) M Surrow	19	21	14
(Chinese Taipei) Chiu P-c (Chinese Taipei) Tung C-t	21	18	21

Quarter-finals
3	(Hong Kong) Yeung N T (Hong Kong) Yeung P L	21	21
(Chinese Taipei) Chiu P-c (Chinese Taipei) Tung C-t	9	12

==== Section 2 ====
First round

Second round
7	(India) R Panda (India) S Panda	5	9
(Malaysia) Lai P J (Malaysia) Lim C S	21	21
(Ukraine) P Buhrova (Ukraine) Y Kantemyr	21	21
(Australia) Yu C (Australia) YR Zhang	6	12

Quarter-finals
(Malaysia) Lai P J (Malaysia) Lim C S	21	21
(Ukraine) P Buhrova (Ukraine) Y Kantemyr	17	19

=== Bottom half ===
==== Section 3 ====
First round
(India) H Rout (India) S Swain	19	19
(Australia) D Nugroho (Australia) K Q Teoh	21	21

Second round
(Australia) D Nugroho (Australia) K Q Teoh	7	8
6	(Chinese Taipei) Sung S-y (Chinese Taipei) Yu C-h	21	21
(Australia) K Lew (Australia) Lim Y-y	4	11
4	(Australia) S Mapasa (Australia) A Yu	21	21

Quarter-finals
6	(Chinese Taipei) Sung S-y (Chinese Taipei) Yu C-h	22	15	18
4	(Australia) S Mapasa (Australia) A Yu	20	21	21

==== Section 4 ====
First round
(Australia) S Tjonadi (Australia) V Tjonadi	21	21
(Australia) R Bairy (Australia) A Bijomon	10	11

Second round
(Australia) S Tjonadi (Australia) V Tjonadi	10	12
(Australia) K Ea (Australia) G Somerville	21	21
(Australia) P Kustiadi (Australia) N Shimizu	9	9
2	(Indonesia) F D Kusuma (Indonesia) A C Pratiwi	21	21

Quarter-finals
(Australia) K Ea (Australia) G Somerville	15	13
2	(Indonesia) F D Kusuma (Indonesia) A C Pratiwi	21	21

== Mixed doubles ==
=== Seeds ===
1. (China) Jiang Zhenbang / Wei Yaxin (champions)
2. (Hong Kong) Tang Chun Man / Tse Ying Suet (semi-finals)
3. (Singapore) Terry Hee / Jessica Tan (quarter-finals)
4. (Indonesia) Rehan Naufal Kusharjanto / Lisa Ayu Kusumawati (first round)
5. (Malaysia) Tan Kian Meng / Lai Pei Jing (semi-finals)
6. (Hong Kong) Lee Chun Hei / Ng Tsz Yau (quarter-finals)
7. (China) Guo Xinwa / Chen Fanghui (final)
8. (India) B. Sumeeth Reddy / N. Sikki Reddy (quarter-finals)

=== Finals ===
Semi-finals
1	(China) Jiang Zhenbang (China) Wei Yaxin	21	21
5	(Malaysia) Tan Kian Meng (Malaysia) Lai Pei Jing	11	11
7	(China) Guo Xinwa (China) Chen Fanghui	21	22
2	(Hong Kong) Tang Chun Man (Hong Kong) Tse Ying Suet	19	20

Final
1	(China) Jiang Zhenbang (China) Wei Yaxin	21	16	21
7	(China) Guo Xinwa (China) Chen Fanghui	12	21	12

=== Top half ===
==== Section 1 ====
First round
1	(China) Jiang Z B (China) Wei Y X	21	21
Q3	(United States) L Wang (United States) E Wang	8	13
(Malaysia) Hoo P R (Malaysia) Cheng S Y	21	21
(India) T Kona (India) S K P Kudaravalli	6	11
8	(India) B S Reddy (India) N S Reddy	21	21
(Malaysia) Wong T C (Malaysia) Lim C S	17	19
(Australia) K C Teoh (Australia) K Q Teoh	14	21	21
(Australia) F Zhao (Australia) YL Zhang	21	13	15

Second round
1	(China) Jiang Z B (China) Wei Y X	21	21
(Malaysia) Hoo P R (Malaysia) Cheng S Y	17	18
8	(India) B S Reddy (India) N S Reddy	21	21
(Australia) K C Teoh (Australia) K Q Teoh	11	11

Quarter-finals
1	(China) Jiang Z B (China) Wei Y X	21	21
8	(India) B S Reddy (India) N S Reddy	12	14

==== Section 2 ====
First round
4	(Indonesia) R N Kusharjanto (Indonesia) L A Kusumawati	26	17	14
(Malaysia) Choong H J (Malaysia) Go P K	24	21	21
(Israel) M Zilberman (Israel) S Zilberman	18	8
Q2	(Australia) T Elbert (Australia) M C Wijaya	21	21
5	(Malaysia) Tan K M (Malaysia) Lai P J	21	21
(Australia) Ep Stephen Sam (Australia) D Nugroho	13	13
Q1	(Australia) F Kurniawan (Australia) V Li	16	10
(New Zealand) A Jeffrey (New Zealand) J Villegas	21	21

Second round
(Malaysia) Choong H J (Malaysia) Go P K	21	21
Q2	(Australia) T Elbert (Australia) M C Wijaya	14	6
5	(Malaysia) Tan K M (Malaysia) Lai P J	21	21
(New Zealand) A Jeffrey (New Zealand) J Villegas	7	7

Quarter-finals
(Malaysia) Choong H J (Malaysia) Go P K	15	21
5	(Malaysia) Tan K M (Malaysia) Lai P J	21	23

=== Bottom half ===
==== Section 3 ====
First round
(Australia) K Igawa (Australia) V Tjonadi	15	17
(Australia) R Wang (Australia) K Ea	21	21
(New Zealand) E Lau (Australia) G Somerville	16	14
7	(China) Guo X W (China) Chen F H	21	21
(India) A R Gupta (India) S Swain	16	10
(Australia) J Yang (Australia) S Tjonadi	21	21
Q4	(Australia) M C Lim (Australia) S Kurniawan	9	16
3	(Singapore) T Hee (Singapore) J Tan	21	21

Second round
(Australia) R Wang (Australia) K Ea	8	14
7	(China) Guo X W (China) Chen F H	21	21
(Australia) J Yang (Australia) S Tjonadi	4	11
3	(Singapore) T Hee (Singapore) J Tan	21	21

Quarter-finals
7	(China) Guo X W (China) Chen F H	24	19	21
3	(Singapore) T Hee (Singapore) J Tan	22	21	16

==== Section 4 ====
First round
(Australia) V Lawrencio (Australia) L Ma	4	5
(Malaysia) Yap R K (Malaysia) V Siow	21	21
(Australia) K Lew (Australia) Lim Y-y	9	10
6	(Hong Kong) Lee C H (Hong Kong) Ng T Y	21	21
(Australia) P Kusumawardana (Australia) N Shimizu	20	19
(Indonesia) J Hidayatullah (Indonesia) A S P Pranata	22	21
(Ukraine) O Titov (Ukraine) Y Kantemyr	9	19
2	(Hong Kong) Tang C M (Hong Kong) Tse Y S	21	21

Second round
(Malaysia) Yap R K (Malaysia) V Siow	21	19	21
6	(Hong Kong) Lee C H (Hong Kong) Ng T Y	17	21	23
(Indonesia) J Hidayatullah (Indonesia) A S P Pranata	18	12
2	(Hong Kong) Tang C M (Hong Kong) Tse Y S	21	21

Quarter-finals
6	(Hong Kong) Lee C H (Hong Kong) Ng T Y	13	12
2	(Hong Kong) Tang C M (Hong Kong) Tse Y S	21	21

Preceded by 2024 Indonesia Open	BWF World Tour; 2024 BWF season	Succeeded by 2024 Kaohsiung Masters
