= 2023 Thailand Masters (badminton) =

Badminton tournament in Thailand

Tournament details
- Dates: 31 January – 5 February
- Level: Super 300
- Total prize money: US$210,000
- Venue: Nimibutr Stadium
- Location: Bangkok, Thailand

Champions
- Men's singles: (Chinese Taipei) Lin Chun-yi
- Women's singles: (China) Zhang Yiman
- Men's doubles: (Indonesia) Leo Rolly Carnando (Indonesia) Daniel Marthin
- Women's doubles: (Thailand) Benyapa Aimsaard (Thailand) Nuntakarn Aimsaard
- Mixed doubles: (China) Feng Yanzhe (China) Huang Dongping

The 2023 Thailand Masters (officially known as the Princess Sirivannavari Thailand Masters 2023 for sponsorship reasons) was a badminton tournament that took place at the Nimibutr Stadium, Bangkok, Thailand, from 31 January to 5 February 2023 and had a total prize of US$210,000.

== Tournament ==
The 2023 Thailand Masters was the fourth tournament of the 2023 BWF World Tour and was part of the Thailand Masters championships, which had been held since 2016. This tournament was organized by the Badminton Association of Thailand with sanction from the BWF.

=== Venue ===
This international tournament was held at the Nimibutr Stadium in Bangkok, Thailand.

=== Point distribution ===
Below is the point distribution table for each phase of the tournament based on the BWF points system for the BWF World Tour Super 300 event.

| Winner | Runner-up | 3/4 | 5/8 | 9/16 | 17/32 | 33/64 | 65/128 |
|---|---|---|---|---|---|---|---|
| 7,000 | 5,950 | 4,900 | 3,850 | 2,750 | 1,670 | 660 | 320 |

=== Prize pool ===
The total prize money was US$210,000 with the distribution of the prize money in accordance with BWF regulations.

| Event | Winner | Finalist | Semi-finals | Quarter-finals | Last 16 |
| Singles | $15,750 | $7,980 | $3,045 | $1,260 | $735 |
| Doubles | $16,590 | $7,980 | $2,940 | $1,522.50 | $787.50 |

== Men's singles ==
=== Seeds ===
1. (Thailand) Kunlavut Vitidsarn (withdrew)
2. (China) Lu Guangzu (withdrew)
3. (Hong Kong) Lee Cheuk Yiu (quarter-finals)
4. (Hong Kong) Ng Ka Long (final)
5. (Japan) Kenta Nishimoto (quarter-finals)
6. (China) Li Shifeng (semi-finals)
7. (Canada) Brian Yang (first round)
8. (Malaysia) Ng Tze Yong (quarter-finals)

=== Finals ===
Semi-finals
(Chinese Taipei) Lin Chun-yi | 21 | 21
(China) Shi Yuqi | 15 | 19
4 | (Hong Kong) Ng Ka Long | 19 | 21 | 21
6 | (China) Li Shifeng | 21 | 8 | 19

Final
(Chinese Taipei) Lin Chun-yi | 21 | 21
4 | (Hong Kong) Ng Ka Long | 17 | 14

=== Top half ===
==== Section 1 ====
First round
PFQ | (Indonesia) T Sugiarto | 21 | 20 | 17
Q2 | (Indonesia) C Adinata | 9 | 22 | 21
(China) Weng HY | 21 | 18 | 19
(Chinese Taipei) Lin C-y | 15 | 21 | 21
5 | (Japan) K Nishimoto | 21 | 21
(India) M Manjunath | 18 | 12
(Thailand) S Thammasin | 15 | 19
(Denmark) A Antonsen | 21 | 21

Second round
Q2 | (Indonesia) C Adinata | 17 | 13
(Chinese Taipei) Lin C-y | 21 | 21
5 | (Japan) K Nishimoto | 23 | 14 | 21
(Denmark) A Antonsen | 21 | 21 | 16

Quarter-finals
(Chinese Taipei) Lin C-y | 21 | 21
5 | (Japan) K Nishimoto | 12 | 11

==== Section 2 ====
First round
3 | (Hong Kong) Lee C Y | 21 | 21
Q3 | (Japan) R Hatano | 19 | 12
(Chinese Taipei) Lee C-h | 17 | 21 | 21
(India) K George | 21 | 19 | 23
7 | (Canada) B Yang | 19 | 15
(Japan) K Watanabe | 21 | 21
(Netherlands) M Caljouw | 22 | 8 | 16
(China) Shi YQ | 20 | 21 | 21

Second round
3 | (Hong Kong) Lee C Y | 20 | 21 | 22
(India) K George | 22 | 15 | 20
(Japan) K Watanabe | 18 | 21 | 12
(China) Shi YQ | 21 | 12 | 21

Quarter-finals
3 | (Hong Kong) Lee C Y | 9 | 11
(China) Shi YQ | 21 | 21

=== Bottom half ===
==== Section 3 ====
First round
(India) P Rajawat | 21 | 19 | 25
(South Korea) Heo K-h | 14 | 21 | 27
(Brazil) Y Coelho | 19 | 10
8 | (Malaysia) Ng T Y | 21 | 21
(Malaysia) Cheam J W | 21 | 21
(Thailand) K Wangcharoen | 18 | 17
(Israel) M Zilberman | 13 | 9
4 | (Hong Kong) Ng K L | 21 | 21

Second round
(South Korea) Heo K-h | 16 | 8
8 | (Malaysia) Ng T Y | 21 | 21
(Malaysia) Cheam J W | 9 | 21 | 9
4 | (Hong Kong) Ng K L | 21 | 12 | 21

Quarter-finals
8 | (Malaysia) Ng T Y | 14 | 20
4 | (Hong Kong) Ng K L | 21 | 22

==== Section 4 ====
First round
(Malaysia) Soong J V | 16 | 25 | 20
Q1 | (Hong Kong) Chan Y C | 21 | 23 | 22
(India) Sa Verma | 14 | 16
6 | (China) Li SF | 21 | 21
(Denmark) V Svendsen | 16 | 9
Q4 | (South Korea) Jeon H-j | 21 | 21
(India) B. Sai Praneeth | 21 | 21
PFQ | (Denmark) M Christophersen | 13 | 14

Second round
Q1 | (Hong Kong) Chan Y C | 19 | 18
6 | (China) Li SF | 21 | 21
Q4 | (South Korea) Jeon H-j | 22 | 21 | 20
(India) B. Sai Praneeth | 24 | 7 | 22

Quarter-finals
6 | (China) Li SF | 21 | 21 | 21
(India) B. Sai Praneeth | 17 | 23 | 18

== Women's singles ==
=== Seeds ===
1. (Thailand) Ratchanok Intanon (withdrew)
2. (Spain) Carolina Marín (withdrew)
3. (Thailand) Busanan Ongbamrungphan (withdrew)
4. (China) Han Yue (final)
5. (Thailand) Pornpawee Chochuwong (withdrew)
6. (Denmark) Line Kjærsfeldt (quarter-finals)
7. (China) Zhang Yiman (champion)
8. (South Korea) Kim Ga-eun (quarter-finals)

=== Finals ===
Semi-finals
(Thailand) Supanida Katethong | 21 | 18 | 20
7 | (China) Zhang Yiman | 15 | 21 | 22
4 | (China) Han Yue | 21 | 21
(Chinese Taipei) Hsu Wen-chi | 11 | 11

Final
7 | (China) Zhang Yiman | 15 | 21 | 21
4 | (China) Han Yue | 21 | 13 | 18

=== Top half ===
==== Section 1 ====
First round
PFQ | (South Korea) Sim Y-j | 21 | 21
PFQ | (Canada) WY Zhang | 15 | 14
(United States) BW Zhang | 21 | 21
(Indonesia) P K Wardani | 12 | 15
PFQ | (Thailand) P Opatniput | 27 | 21
(United States) L Lam | 25 | 17
(Thailand) S Katethong | 21 | 14 | 21
Q1 | (Singapore) I Khan | 10 | 21 | 15

Second round
PFQ | (South Korea) Sim Y-j | 21 | 21
(United States) BW Zhang | 12 | 17
PFQ | (Thailand) P Opatniput | 11 | 16
(Thailand) S Katethong | 21 | 21

Quarter-finals
PFQ | (South Korea) Sim Y-j | 16 | 9
(Thailand) S Katethong | 21 | 21

==== Section 2 ====
First round
PFQ | (Canada) R Chan | 13 | 12
(Japan) R Gunji | 21 | 21
(Chinese Taipei) Pai Y-p | 21 | 13 | 21
(Japan) S Kawakami | 16 | 21 | 16
7 | (China) Zhang YM | 21 | 14 | 21
PFQ | (Myanmar) Thet Htar T | 11 | 21 | 10
Q3 | (Thailand) P Choeikeewong | 21 | 15 | 21
(Malaysia) Kisona S | 19 | 21 | 12

Second round
(Japan) R Gunji | 12 | 20
(Chinese Taipei) Pai Y-p | 21 | 22
7 | (China) Zhang YM | 21 | 21
Q3 | (Thailand) P Choeikeewong | 11 | 13

Quarter-finals
(Chinese Taipei) Pai Y-p | 16 | 20
7 | (China) Zhang YM | 21 | 22

=== Bottom half ===
==== Section 3 ====
First round
(India) A Upadhyaya | 16 | 19
(India) A Chaliha | 21 | 21
PFQ | (Ukraine) P Buhrova | 12 | 12
6 | (Denmark) L Kjærsfeldt | 21 | 21
(Denmark) M Blichfeldt | 21 | 21
PFQ | (Canada) T Ng | 9 | 10
(Japan) N Nidaira | 21 | 15 | 12
4 | (China) Han Y | 18 | 21 | 21

Second round
(India) A Chaliha | 21 | 13 | 27
6 | (Denmark) L Kjærsfeldt | 19 | 21 | 29
(Denmark) M Blichfeldt | 8 | 1^{r}
4 | (China) Han Y | 21 | 7

Quarter-finals
6 | (Denmark) L Kjærsfeldt | 13 | 10
4 | (China) Han Y | 21 | 21

==== Section 4 ====
First round
(Chinese Taipei) Sung S-y | 21 | 18 | 21
Q4 | (Thailand) T Nithiittikrai | 14 | 21 | 15
(Denmark) L Christophersen | 18 | 14
8 | (South Korea) Kim G-e | 21 | 21
(Belgium) L Tan | 21 | 21
Q2 | (Republic of Ireland) K Frost | 8 | 19
(Chinese Taipei) Hsu W-c | 21 | 16 | 21
PFQ | (Indonesia) K A C Dewi | 15 | 21 | 15

Second round
(Chinese Taipei) Sung S-y | 21 | 18 | 19
8 | (South Korea) Kim G-e | 17 | 21 | 21
(Belgium) L Tan | 13 | 17
(Chinese Taipei) Hsu W-c | 21 | 21

Quarter-finals
8 | (South Korea) Kim G-e | 21 | 14 | 16
(Chinese Taipei) Hsu W-c | 17 | 21 | 21

== Men's doubles ==
=== Seeds ===
1. (India) Satwiksairaj Rankireddy / Chirag Shetty (withdrew)
2. (Malaysia) Ong Yew Sin / Teo Ee Yi (withdrew)
3. (Indonesia) Muhammad Shohibul Fikri / Bagas Maulana (semi-finals)
4. (Indonesia) Leo Rolly Carnando / Daniel Marthin (champions)
5. (China) He Jiting / Zhou Haodong (first round)
6. (Indonesia) Pramudya Kusumawardana / Yeremia Rambitan (quarter-finals)
7. (China) Ren Xiangyu / Tan Qiang (first round)
8. (Denmark) Jeppe Bay / Lasse Mølhede (withdrew)

=== Finals ===
Semi-finals
(Chinese Taipei) Su Ching-heng (Chinese Taipei) Ye Hong-wei | 21 | 13 | 21
3 | (Indonesia) Muhammad Shohibul Fikri (Indonesia) Bagas Maulana | 17 | 21 | 19
4 | (Indonesia) Leo Rolly Carnando (Indonesia) Daniel Marthin | 18 | 21 | 21
(Thailand) Supak Jomkoh (Thailand) Kittinupong Kedren | 21 | 17 | 17

Final
(Chinese Taipei) Su Ching-heng (Chinese Taipei) Ye Hong-wei | 16 | 17
4 | (Indonesia) Leo Rolly Carnando (Indonesia) Daniel Marthin | 21 | 21

=== Top half ===
==== Section 1 ====
First round
PFQ | (Malaysia) Boon X Y (Malaysia) Wong T C | 21 | 21 | 15
(Chinese Taipei) Su C-h (Chinese Taipei) Ye H-w | 23 | 19 | 21
Q4 | (Thailand) W Phakjarung (Thailand) W Thongkham | 21 | 21
(Republic of Ireland) J Magee (Republic of Ireland) P Reynolds | 16 | 17
6 | (Indonesia) P Kusumawardana (Indonesia) Y Rambitan | 21 | 19 | 21
PFQ | (Malaysia) Goh V S (Malaysia) Lim K W | 19 | 21 | 14
PFQ | (China) Chen BY (China) Liu Y | 17 | 16
Q3 | (Thailand) P Sukphun (Thailand) P Teeraratsakul | 21 | 21

Second round
(Chinese Taipei) Su C-h (Chinese Taipei) Ye H-w | 21 | 21
Q4 | (Thailand) W Phakjarung (Thailand) W Thongkham | 19 | 19
6 | (Indonesia) P Kusumawardana (Indonesia) Y Rambitan | 22 | 21
Q3 | (Thailand) P Sukphun (Thailand) P Teeraratsakul | 20 | 13

Quarter-finals
(Chinese Taipei) Su C-h (Chinese Taipei) Ye H-w | 21 | 19 | 21
6 | (Indonesia) P Kusumawardana (Indonesia) Y Rambitan | 17 | 21 | 19

==== Section 2 ====
First round
3 | (Indonesia) M S Fikri (Indonesia) B Maulana | 21 | 21
(Thailand) P Kaosamaang (Thailand) W Thongsa-nga | 17 | 14
(Indonesia) S K Gutama (Indonesia) M R P Isfahani | 25 | 16
Q1 | (Malaysia) Low H Y (Malaysia) Ng E C | 27 | 21
5 | (China) He JT (China) Zhou HD | 21 | 20 | 16
(Thailand) C Charoenkitamorn (Thailand) N Yordphaisong | 17 | 22 | 21
PFQ | (Indonesia) R Fadillah (Indonesia) R Hidayat | 21 | 21
(Canada) A Dong (Canada) N Yakura | 11 | 12

Second round
3 | (Indonesia) M S Fikri (Indonesia) B Maulana | 21 | 21
Q1 | (Malaysia) Low H Y (Malaysia) Ng E C | 10 | 15
(Thailand) C Charoenkitamorn (Thailand) N Yordphaisong | 24 | 19 | 16
PFQ | (Indonesia) R Fadillah (Indonesia) R Hidayat | 22 | 21 | 21

Quarter-finals
3 | (Indonesia) M S Fikri (Indonesia) B Maulana | 21 | 16 | 21
PFQ | (Indonesia) R Fadillah (Indonesia) R Hidayat | 16 | 21 | 15

=== Bottom half ===
==== Section 3 ====
First round
Q2 | (Thailand) T Punpanich (Thailand) W Sothon | 17 | 21 | 21
(Chinese Taipei) Lee F-c (Chinese Taipei) Lee F-j | 21 | 18 | 19
(India) I Bhatnagar (India) K. S Pratheek | 21 | 21
PFQ | (United States) V Chiu (United States) J Yuan | 18 | 12
(India) P. S. Ravikrishna (India) S P Udayakumar | 21 | 18 | 10
(Chinese Taipei) Lee J-h (Chinese Taipei) Yang P-hs | 16 | 21 | 21
(Denmark) R Kjær (Denmark) F Søgaard | 11 | 21 | 19
4 | (Indonesia) L R Carnando (Indonesia) D Marthin | 21 | 18 | 21

Second round
Q2 | (Thailand) T Punpanich (Thailand) W Sothon | 21 | 18 | 26
(India) I Bhatnagar (India) K. S Pratheek | 14 | 21 | 24
(Chinese Taipei) Lee J-h (Chinese Taipei) Yang P-hs | 13 | 20
4 | (Indonesia) L R Carnando (Indonesia) D Marthin | 21 | 22

Quarter-finals
Q2 | (Thailand) T Punpanich (Thailand) W Sothon | 15 | 19
4 | (Indonesia) L R Carnando (Indonesia) D Marthin | 21 | 21

==== Section 4 ====
First round
(Thailand) S Jomkoh (Thailand) K Kedren | 21 | 21
PFQ | (Australia) H Tang (Thailand) T Viriyangkura | 11 | 13
(Chinese Taipei) Chang K-c (Chinese Taipei) Po L-w | 17 | 21 | 24
7 | (China) Ren XY (China) Tan Q | 21 | 18 | 22
(Chinese Taipei) Chiu H-c (Chinese Taipei) Yang M-t | 21 | 13 | 21
(Japan) A Endo (Japan) Y Takei | 7 | 21 | 16
(South Korea) Jin Y (South Korea) Na S-s | 14 | 18
PFQ | (Malaysia) N M Azriyn A (Malaysia) Low J S | 21 | 21

Second round
(Thailand) S Jomkoh (Thailand) K Kedren | 21 | 21
(Chinese Taipei) Chang K-c (Chinese Taipei) Po L-w | 18 | 15
(Chinese Taipei) Chiu H-c (Chinese Taipei) Yang M-t | 14 | 21 | 21
PFQ | (Malaysia) N M Azriyn A (Malaysia) Low J S | 21 | 19 | 16

Quarter-finals
(Thailand) S Jomkoh (Thailand) K Kedren | 21 | 21
(Chinese Taipei) Chiu H-c (Chinese Taipei) Yang M-t | 14 | 19

== Women's doubles ==
=== Seeds ===
1. (Thailand) Jongkolphan Kititharakul / Rawinda Prajongjai (second round)
2. (Thailand) Benyapa Aimsaard / Nuntakarn Aimsaard (champions)
3. (India) Treesa Jolly / Gayatri Gopichand (first round)
4. (Indonesia) Febriana Dwipuji Kusuma / Amalia Cahaya Pratiwi (second round)
5. (China) Li Wenmei / Liu Xuanxuan (semi-finals)
6. (China) Liu Shengshu / Zhang Shuxian (second round)
7. (Japan) Rui Hirokami / Yuna Kato (quarter-finals)
8. (Hong Kong) Ng Tsz Yau / Tsang Hiu Yan (first round)

=== Finals ===
Semi-finals
(South Korea) Baek Ha-na (South Korea) Lee So-hee | 21 | 21
5 | (China) Li Wenmei (China) Liu Xuanxuan | 16 | 19
(China) Tan Ning (China) Xia Yuting | 16 | 18
2 | (Thailand) Benyapa Aimsaard (Thailand) Nuntakarn Aimsaard | 21 | 21

Final
(South Korea) Baek Ha-na (South Korea) Lee So-hee | 6 | 11
2 | (Thailand) Benyapa Aimsaard (Thailand) Nuntakarn Aimsaard | 21 | 21

=== Top half ===
==== Section 1 ====
First round
1 | (Thailand) J Kititharakul (Thailand) R Prajongjai | 21 | 21
PFQ | (Thailand) L Kanlaha (Thailand) P Muenwong | 10 | 10
(South Korea) Baek H-n (South Korea) Lee S-h | 21 | 21
(Chinese Taipei) Hu L-f (Chinese Taipei) Lin X-m | 16 | 14
8 | (Hong Kong) Ng T Y (Hong Kong) Tsang H Y | 16 | 19
(Indonesia) L T Mayasari (Indonesia) R Sugiarto | 21 | 21
(Chinese Taipei) Hsieh P-s (Chinese Taipei) Tseng Y-c | 18 | 21 | 11
(Chinese Taipei) Chang C-h (Chinese Taipei) Yang C-t | 21 | 12 | 21

Second round
1 | (Thailand) J Kititharakul (Thailand) R Prajongjai | 13 | 17
(South Korea) Baek H-n (South Korea) Lee S-h | 21 | 21
(Indonesia) L T Mayasari (Indonesia) R Sugiarto | 21 | 21
(Chinese Taipei) Chang C-h (Chinese Taipei) Yang C-t | 15 | 15

Quarter-finals
(South Korea) Baek H-n (South Korea) Lee S-h | 21 | 21
(Indonesia) L T Mayasari (Indonesia) R Sugiarto | 12 | 14

==== Section 2 ====
First round
4 | (Indonesia) F D Kusuma (Indonesia) A C Pratiwi | 21 | 21
Q1 | (Thailand) T Kleebyeesun (Thailand) P Laisuan | 14 | 10
Q3 | (China) Li YJ (China) Luo XM | 21 | 21
(Canada) C Choi (Canada) J Wu | 8 | 17
5 | (China) Li WM (China) Liu XX | 21 | 21
(Republic of Ireland) K Frost (Republic of Ireland) M Ryan | 7 | 12
(Thailand) P Phatcharaphisutsin (Thailand) N Sukklad | 14 | 18
(Indonesia) M T Puspita Sari (Indonesia) R A Rose | 21 | 21

Second round
4 | (Indonesia) F D Kusuma (Indonesia) A C Pratiwi | 12 | 17
Q3 | (China) Li YJ (China) Luo XM | 21 | 21
5 | (China) Li WM (China) Liu XX | 26 | 21
(Indonesia) M T Puspita Sari (Indonesia) R A Rose | 24 | 13

Quarter-finals
Q3 | (China) Li YJ (China) Luo XM | 16 | 21 | 11
5 | (China) Li WM (China) Liu XX | 21 | 18 | 21

=== Bottom half ===
==== Section 3 ====
First round
Q2 | (South Korea) Lee Y-l (South Korea) Shin S-c | 21 | 21
PFQ | (United States) P L Cao Hok (United States) L Lam | 13 | 14
(India) S Singhi (India) R Thaker | 8 | 10
6 | (China) Liu SS (China) Zhang SX | 21 | 21
(India) T Crasto (India) A Ponnappa | 15 | 18
(China) Tan N (China) Xia YT | 21 | 21
(Japan) R Miyaura (Japan) A Sakuramoto | 21 | 21
3 | (India) T Jolly (India) G Gopichand | 9 | 10

Second round
Q2 | (South Korea) Lee Y-l (South Korea) Shin S-c | 21 | 21
6 | (China) Liu SS (China) Zhang SX | 18 | 17
(China) Tan N (China) Xia YT | 13 | 21 | 21
(Japan) R Miyaura (Japan) A Sakuramoto | 21 | 15 | 14

Quarter-finals
Q2 | (South Korea) Lee Y-l (South Korea) Shin S-c | 16 | 16
(China) Tan N (China) Xia YT | 21 | 21

==== Section 4 ====
First round
Q4 | (Hong Kong) Fan K Y (Hong Kong) Yau M Y | 21 | 21
(United States) A Xu (United States) K Xu | 12 | 11
PFQ | (Chinese Taipei) Liu C-y (Chinese Taipei) Wang Y-q | 15 | 14
7 | (Japan) R Hirokami (Japan) Y Kato | 21 | 21
(Chinese Taipei) Hsu Y-c (Chinese Taipei) Lin W-c | 21 | 21 | 21
(Thailand) S Paewsampran (Thailand) P Supajirakul | 23 | 14 | 17
(United States) F Corbett (United States) A Lee | 10 | 12
2 | (Thailand) B Aimsaard (Thailand) N Aimsaard | 21 | 21

Second round
Q4 | (Hong Kong) Fan K Y (Hong Kong) Yau M Y | 15 | 14
7 | (Japan) R Hirokami (Japan) Y Kato | 21 | 21
(Chinese Taipei) Hsu Y-c (Chinese Taipei) Lin W-c | 12 | 15
2 | (Thailand) B Aimsaard (Thailand) N Aimsaard | 21 | 21

Quarter-finals
7 | (Japan) R Hirokami (Japan) Y Kato | 20 | 16
2 | (Thailand) B Aimsaard (Thailand) N Aimsaard | 22 | 21

== Mixed doubles ==
=== Seeds ===
1. (Malaysia) Tan Kian Meng / Lai Pei Jing (withdrew)
2. (Malaysia) Goh Soon Huat / Shevon Jemie Lai (second round)
3. (Thailand) Supak Jomkoh / Supissara Paewsampran (second round)
4. (Indonesia) Rehan Naufal Kusharjanto / Lisa Ayu Kusumawati (second round)
5. (South Korea) Seo Seung-jae / Chae Yoo-jung (final)
6. (China) Feng Yanzhe / Huang Dongping (champions)
7. (Singapore) Terry Hee / Jessica Tan (first round)
8. (India) Ishaan Bhatnagar / Tanisha Crasto (second round)

=== Finals ===
Semi-finals
5 | (South Korea) Seo Seung-jae (South Korea) Chae Yoo-jung | 21 | 15 | 22
(South Korea) Kim Won-ho (South Korea) Jeong Na-eun | 13 | 21 | 20
6 | (China) Feng Yanzhe (China) Huang Dongping | 21 | 21
(Japan) Hiroki Midorikawa (Japan) Natsu Saito | 18 | 11

Final
5 | (South Korea) Seo Seung-jae (South Korea) Chae Yoo-jung | 21 | 15 | 12
6 | (China) Feng Yanzhe (China) Huang Dongping | 18 | 21 | 21

=== Top half ===
==== Section 1 ====
First round
PFQ | (United States) J Yuan (United States) A Lee | 14 | 7
Q3 | (Indonesia) A Syahnawi (Indonesia) W O Kandow | 21 | 21
(Malaysia) Chan P S (Malaysia) Cheah Y S | 18 | 21 | 21
(Chinese Taipei) Chang K-c (Chinese Taipei) Lee C-c | 21 | 19 | 15
5 | (South Korea) Seo S-j (South Korea) Chae Y-j | 12 | 21 | 21
(China) Jiang ZB (China) Wei YX | 21 | 17 | 9
Q4 | (South Korea) Jin Y (South Korea) Shin S-c | 21 | 21
(Denmark) M Thyrri (Denmark) A Magelund | 16 | 16

Second round
Q3 | (Indonesia) A Syahnawi (Indonesia) W O Kandow | 21 | 21
(Malaysia) Chan P S (Malaysia) Cheah Y S | 19 | 15
5 | (South Korea) Seo S-j (South Korea) Chae Y-j | 21 | 21
Q4 | (South Korea) Jin Y (South Korea) Shin S-c | 10 | 14

Quarter-finals
Q3 | (Indonesia) A Syahnawi (Indonesia) W O Kandow | 14 | 12
5 | (South Korea) Seo S-j (South Korea) Chae Y-j | 21 | 21

==== Section 2 ====
First round
4 | (Indonesia) R N Kusharjanto (Indonesia) L A Kusumawati | 21 | 21
(India) B. S Reddy (India) A Ponnappa | 11 | 17
(Thailand) R Oupthong (Thailand) J Sudjaipraparat | 18 | 12
(South Korea) Kim W-h (South Korea) Jeong N-e | 21 | 21
7 | (Singapore) T Hee (Singapore) J Tan | 12 | 21 | 19
PFQ | (Chinese Taipei) Chiu H-c (Chinese Taipei) Lin X-m | 21 | 18 | 21
Q1 | (Thailand) V Kanjanakeereewong (Thailand) N Laisuan | 12 | 15
(Indonesia) Z J Sumanti (Indonesia) H Julimarbela | 21 | 21

Second round
4 | (Indonesia) R N Kusharjanto (Indonesia) L A Kusumawati | 14 | 10
(South Korea) Kim W-h (South Korea) Jeong N-e | 21 | 21
PFQ | (Chinese Taipei) Chiu H-c (Chinese Taipei) Lin X-m | 14 | 12
(Indonesia) Z J Sumanti (Indonesia) H Julimarbela | 21 | 21

Quarter-finals
(South Korea) Kim W-h (South Korea) Jeong N-e | 21 | 19 | 21
(Indonesia) Z J Sumanti (Indonesia) H Julimarbela | 16 | 21 | 15

=== Bottom half ===
==== Section 3 ====
First round
(Canada) T A Lindeman (Canada) J Wu | 11 | 16
(India) R Kapoor (India) N. S Reddy | 21 | 21
(Chinese Taipei) Yang P-h (Chinese Taipei) Hu L-f | 21 | 13
6 | (China) Feng YZ (China) Huang DP | 23 | 21
(Indonesia) D Ferdinansyah (Indonesia) G E Widjaja | 14 | 21 | 21
Q2 | (Chinese Taipei) Po L-w (Chinese Taipei) Chang C-h | 21 | 8 | 18
(United States) V Chiu (United States) J Gai | 12 | 9
3 | (Thailand) S Jomkoh (Thailand) S Paewsampran | 21 | 21

Second round
(India) R Kapoor (India) N. S Reddy | 11 | 10
6 | (China) Feng YZ (China) Huang DP | 21 | 21
(Indonesia) D Ferdinansyah (Indonesia) G E Widjaja | 19 | 21 | 21
3 | (Thailand) S Jomkoh (Thailand) S Paewsampran | 21 | 19 | 16

Quarter-finals
6 | (China) Feng YZ (China) Huang DP | 21 | 21
(Indonesia) D Ferdinansyah (Indonesia) G E Widjaja | 18 | 11

==== Section 4 ====
First round
(Chinese Taipei) Lee J-h (Chinese Taipei) Hsu Y-c | 17 | 21 | 18
(Indonesia) A B Cahyono (Indonesia) M G Islami | 21 | 18 | 21
PFQ | (Thailand) R Makkasasithorn (Thailand) C Korepap | 17 | 5
8 | (India) I Bhatnagar (India) T Crasto | 21 | 21
(Japan) H Midorikawa (Japan) N Saito | 21 | 22
PFQ | (China) Cheng X (China) Chen FH | 16 | 20
(Israel) M Zilberman (Israel) S Zilberman | 9 | 14
2 | (Malaysia) Goh S H (Malaysia) S J Lai | 21 | 21

Second round
(Indonesia) A B Cahyono (Indonesia) M G Islami | 21 | 21
8 | (India) I Bhatnagar (India) T Crasto | 19 | 16
(Japan) H Midorikawa (Japan) N Saito | 21 | 21
2 | (Malaysia) Goh S H (Malaysia) S J Lai | 15 | 10

Quarter-finals
(Indonesia) A B Cahyono (Indonesia) M G Islami | 12 | 23
(Japan) H Midorikawa (Japan) N Saito | 21 | 25

| Preceded by 2023 Indonesia Masters | BWF World Tour; 2023 BWF season | Succeeded by 2023 German Open |
