= Lim Chiew Sien =

Malaysian badminton player (born 1994)

Lim Chiew Sien 林秋仙
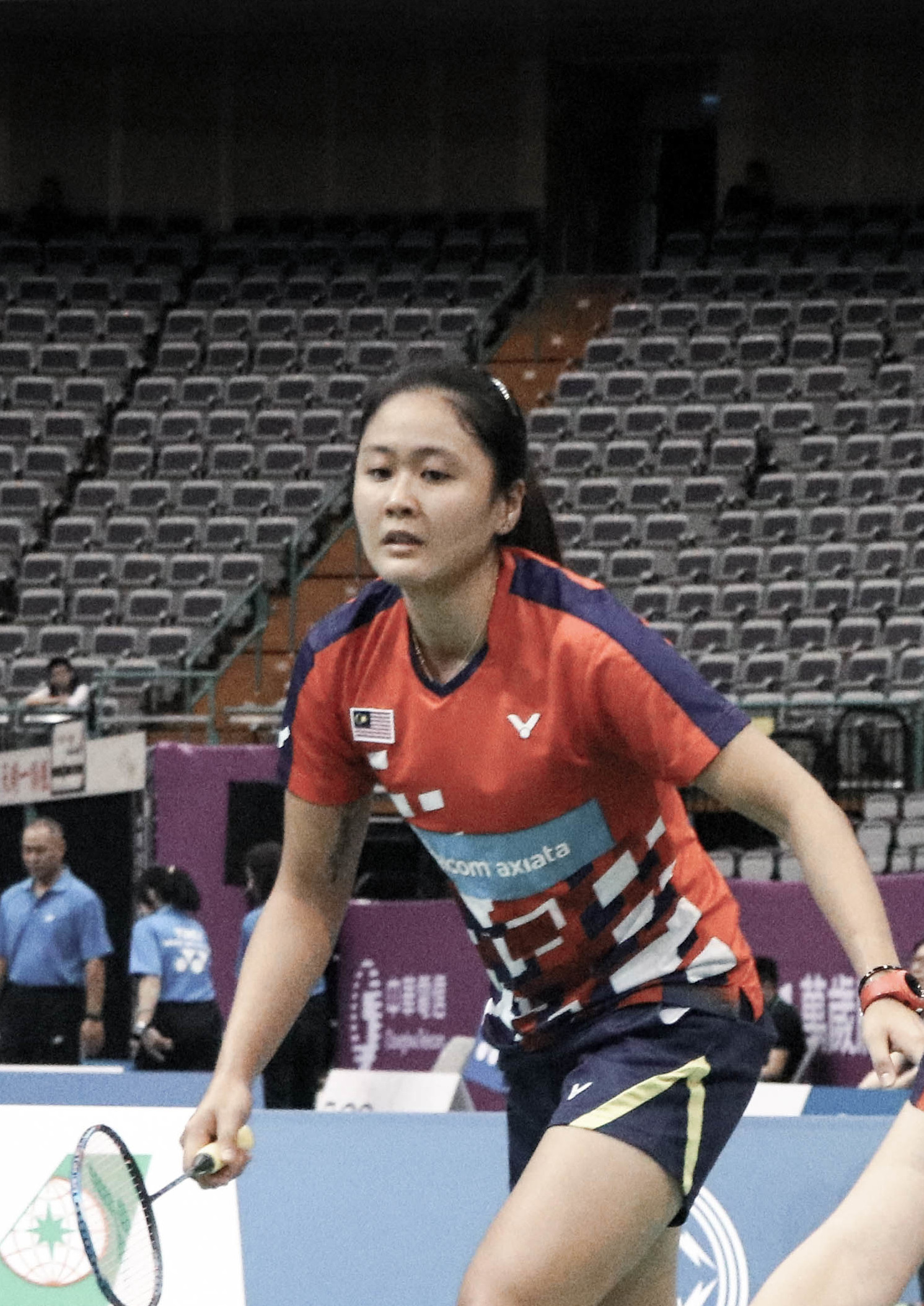
- Lim at the 2018 Chinese Taipei Open

Personal information
- Born: 14 May 1994 (age 32) Johor, Malaysia
- Height: 1.72 m (5 ft 8 in)
- Weight: 68 kg (150 lb)

Sport
- Country: Malaysia
- Sport: Badminton
- Handedness: Right
- Coached by: Chew Choon Eng

Women's & mixed doubles
- Highest ranking: 15 (WD with Vivian Hoo, 27 December 2022); 26 (XD with Wong Tien Ci, 1 April 2025)
- Current ranking: 37 (XD with Wong Tien Ci, 7 July 2026)
- BWF profile
Medal record
Women's badminton
Representing Malaysia
World Junior Championships
Gold medal – first place	2011 Taipei	Mixed team
Asian Junior Championships
Bronze medal – third place	2012 Gimcheon	Mixed team

Lim Chiew Sien (Chinese: 林秋仙; pinyin: Lín Qiūxiān; born 14 May 1994) is a Malaysian badminton player. She competed at the 2013 Southeast Asian Games and 2014 Asian Games.

== Career ==
Lim joined the Malaysian national team when she was 16, played as a singles player for six years before switching to doubles in 2016.

In March 2020, Lim left the national team and started her badminton career as an independent player.

== Achievements ==
=== BWF World Tour (1 runner-up) ===
The BWF World Tour, which was announced on 19 March 2017 and implemented in 2018, is a series of elite badminton tournaments, sanctioned by Badminton World Federation (BWF). The BWF World Tour is divided into six levels, namely World Tour Finals, Super 1000, Super 750, Super 500, Super 300 (part of the HSBC World Tour), and the BWF Tour Super 100.

Women's doubles
Year	Tournament	Level	Partner	Opponent	Score	Result
2024	Australian Open	Super 500	(Malaysia) Lai Pei Jing	(Indonesia) Febriana Dwipuji Kusuma (Indonesia) Amallia Cahaya Pratiwi	21–12, 7–21, 13–21	(silver) Runner-up

=== BWF International Challenge/Series (2 titles, 3 runners-up) ===
Women's singles
Year	Tournament	Opponent	Score	Result
2015	Polish International	(Malaysia) Ho Yen Mei	16–21, 12–21	(silver) Runner-up

Women's doubles
Year	Tournament	Partner	Opponent	Score	Result
2016	India International Series	(Malaysia) Goh Yea Ching	(Malaysia) Joyce Choong (Malaysia) Lim Jee Lynn	11–6, 11–7, 6–11, 11–7	(gold) Winner
2018	Indonesia International	(Malaysia) Tan Sueh Jeou	(Indonesia) Shella Devi Aulia (Indonesia) Pia Zebadiah Bernadet	17–21, 12–21	(silver) Runner-up
2018	Malaysia International	(Malaysia) Tan Sueh Jeou	(Malaysia) Soong Fie Cho (Malaysia) Tee Jing Yi	13–21, 10–21	(silver) Runner-up

Mixed doubles
Year	Tournament	Partner	Opponent	Score	Result
2024	Kazakhstan International	(Malaysia) Wong Tien Ci	(India) Sanjai Srivatsa Dhanraj (India) K. Maneesha	9–21, 21–7, 21–12	(gold) Winner

BWF International Challenge tournament
BWF International Series tournament
BWF Future Series tournament
