= 2019 Swiss Open (badminton) =

Badminton tournament in Basel

Tournament details
- Dates: 12–17 March
- Level: Super 300
- Total prize money: US$150,000
- Venue: St. Jakobshalle
- Location: Basel, Switzerland

Champions
- Men's singles: (China) Shi Yuqi
- Women's singles: (China) Chen Yufei
- Men's doubles: (Indonesia) Fajar Alfian (Indonesia) Muhammad Rian Ardianto
- Women's doubles: (South Korea) Chang Ye-na (South Korea) Jung Kyung-eun
- Mixed doubles: (Denmark) Mathias Bay-Smidt (Denmark) Rikke Søby Hansen

The 2019 Swiss Open (officially known as the Yonex Swiss Open 2019 for sponsorship reasons) was a badminton tournament which took place at St. Jakobshalle in Basel, Switzerland, from 12 to 17 March 2019 and had a total purse of $150,000.

== Tournament ==
The 2019 Swiss Open was the seventh tournament of the 2019 BWF World Tour and also part of the Swiss Open championships which had been held since 1955. This tournament was organized by the Swiss Badminton and sanctioned by the BWF.

=== Venue ===
This international tournament was held at St. Jakobshalle in Basel, Switzerland.

=== Point distribution ===
Below is the point distribution table for each phase of the tournament based on the BWF points system for the BWF World Tour Super 300 event.

Winner	Runner-up	3/4	5/8	9/16	17/32	33/64	65/128
7,000	5,950	4,900	3,850	2,750	1,670	660	320

=== Prize money ===
The total prize money for this tournament was US$150,000. Distribution of prize money was in accordance with BWF regulations.

Event	Winner	Finals	Semi-finals	Quarter-finals	Last 16
Singles	$11,250	$5,700	$2,175	$900	$525
Doubles	$11,850	$5,700	$2,100	$1,087.50	$562.50

== Men's singles ==
=== Seeds ===
1. (China) Shi Yuqi (champion)
2. (China) Chen Long (semi-finals)
3. (Denmark) Viktor Axelsen (withdrew)
4. (Indonesia) Anthony Sinisuka Ginting (semi-finals)
5. (Indonesia) Jonatan Christie (second round)
6. (Indonesia) Tommy Sugiarto (first round)
7. (China) Lin Dan (quarter-finals)
8. (India) Sameer Verma (second round)

=== Wild card ===
Swiss Badminton awarded a wild card entry to Christian Kirchmayr of Switzerland.

=== Finals ===
Semi-finals
1	(China) Shi Yuqi	21	21
4	(Indonesia) Anthony Sinisuka Ginting	9	17
(India) B. Sai Praneeth	21	21
2	(China) Chen Long	18	13

Final
1	(China) Shi Yuqi	19	21	21
(India) B. Sai Praneeth	21	18	12

=== Top half ===
==== Section 1 ====
First Round
1	(China) Shi YQ	21	21	21
PFQ	(Russia) V Malkov	10	23	17
Q2	(Finland) K Koljonen	21	17	18
(Brazil) Y Coelho	11	21	21
6	(Indonesia) T Sugiarto	21	10	17
(Netherlands) M Caljouw	17	21	21
(India) Parupalli K	21	21
Q1	(Sweden) F Burestedt	19	17

Second Round
1	(China) Shi YQ	16	21	21
(Brazil) Y Coelho	21	15	11
(Netherlands) M Caljouw	21	21
(India) Parupalli K	15	16

Quarter-finals
1	(China) Shi YQ	21	21
(Netherlands) M Caljouw	17	9

==== Section 2 ====
First Round
4	(Indonesia) A S Ginting	21	21
(France) T Rouxel	19	14
(France) T J Popov	12	19
(Malaysia) Liew D	21	21
7	(China) Lin D	21	21
WC	(Switzerland) C Kirchmayr	11	6
(South Korea) Lee D-k	21	21
(Denmark) R Gemke	18	14

Second Round
4	(Indonesia) A S Ginting	21	21
(Malaysia) Liew D	13	17
7	(China) Lin D	21	21
(South Korea) Lee D-k	19	17

Quarter-finals
4	(Indonesia) A S Ginting	14	21	21
7	(China) Lin D	21	8	11

=== Bottom half ===
==== Section 3 ====
First Round
(India) B. Sai Praneeth	11
(England) R Ouseph	5^{r}
PFQ	(India) A Jayaram	18	15
8	(India) Sa Verma	21	21
(Denmark) V Svendsen	10	20
PFQ	(Chinese Taipei) Lin Y-h	21	22
(France) L Corvée	21	21
PFQ	(England) T Penty	19	19

Second Round
(India) B. Sai Praneeth	21	22
8	(India) Sa Verma	14	20
PFQ	(Chinese Taipei) Lin Y-h	19	23	15
(France) L Corvée	21	21	21

Quarter-finals
(India) B. Sai Praneeth	21	21
(France) L Corvée	13	11

==== Section 4 ====
First Round
Q4	(France) L Claerbout	19	17
(India) S Dey	21	21
(Malaysia) Lee Z J	9	17
5	(Indonesia) J Christie	21	21
(China) Huang YX	24	21
Q3	(Estonia) R Must	22	16
(Japan) Y Igarashi	12	11
2	(China) Chen L	21	21

Second Round
(India) S Dey	12	22	21
5	(Indonesia) J Christie	21	20	17
(China) Huang YX	15	21	11
2	(China) Chen L	21	16	21

Quarter-finals
(India) S Dey	18	17
2	(China) Chen L	21	21

== Women's singles ==
=== Seeds ===
1. (China) Chen Yufei (champion)
2. (China) He Bingjiao (withdrew)
3. (India) Saina Nehwal (withdrew)
4. (South Korea) Sung Ji-hyun (semi-finals)
5. (United States) Beiwen Zhang (semi-finals)
6. (Canada) Michelle Li (second round)
7. (Denmark) Mia Blichfeldt (withdrew)
8. (Russia) Evgeniya Kosetskaya (quarter-finals)

=== Finals ===
Semi-finals
1	(China) Chen Yufei	21	21
4	(South Korea) Sung Ji-hyun	14	15
(Japan) Saena Kawakami	21	21
5	(United States) Beiwen Zhang	19	17

Final
1	(China) Chen Yufei	21	21
(Japan) Saena Kawakami	9	16

=== Top half ===
==== Section 1 ====
First Round
1	(China) Chen YF	21	21
(France) Qi XF	14	11
(India) V R Jakka	12	23	9
(Estonia) K Kuuba	21	21	21
6	(Canada) M Li	21	21
PFQ	(India) V Gummadi	14	11
(Bulgaria) L Zetchiri	23	15	8
Q3	(India) R Mookerjee	21	21	21

Second Round
1	(China) Chen YF	21	20	21
(Estonia) K Kuuba	12	22	13
6	(Canada) M Li	16^{r}
Q3	(India) R Mookerjee	18

Quarter-finals
1	(China) Chen YF	21	21
Q3	(India) R Mookerjee	10	8

==== Section 2 ====
First Round
4	(South Korea) Sung J-h	23	19	12
(Switzerland) S Jaquet	21	21	3^{r}
(Netherlands) S de Visch Eijbergen	14	23
(Canada) B Tam	21	25
8	(Russia) E Kosetskaya	21	21
(England) C Birch	17	15
(Bulgaria) M Mitsova	21	21
(Slovakia) M Repiská	13	19

Second Round
4	(South Korea) Sung J-h	21	21
(Canada) B Tam	18	11
8	(Russia) E Kosetskaya	21	21
(Bulgaria) M Mitsova	18	19

Quarter-finals
4	(South Korea) Sung J-h	21	21
8	(Russia) E Kosetskaya	18	11

=== Bottom half ===
==== Section 3 ====
First Round
(Germany) F Deprez	21	11	21
(Chinese Taipei) Lee C-h	17	21	19
(Japan) S Kawakami	21	21
PFQ	(Spain) S Peñalver	10	10
(Belgium) L Tan	21	21
(Russia) N Perminova	10	12
Q4	(Spain) C Azurmendi	21	21
PFQ	(United States) I Zhong	4	6

Second Round
(Germany) F Deprez	6	9
(Japan) S Kawakami	21	21
(Belgium) L Tan	7	21	20
Q4	(Spain) C Azurmendi	21	18	22

Quarter-finals
(Japan) S Kawakami	21	21
Q4	(Spain) C Azurmendi	16	14

==== Section 4 ====
First Round
Q2	(Switzerland) J Stadelmann	14	17
(Denmark) J D Jakobsen	21	21
(Israel) K Polikarpova	8	13
5	(United States) BW Zhang	21	21
(Japan) A Mine	21	21
Q1	(Hungary) D Gonda	6	7
(Germany) Y Li	23	21
PFQ	(Denmark) I A Andersen	21	19

Second Round
(Denmark) J D Jakobsen	7	16
5	(United States) BW Zhang	21	21
(Japan) A Mine	21	21
(Germany) Y Li	11	16

Quarter-finals
5	(United States) BW Zhang	21	17	21
(Japan) A Mine	13	21	9

== Men's doubles ==
=== Seeds ===
1. (China) Li Junhui / Liu Yuchen (withdrew)
2. (Denmark) Kim Astrup / Anders Skaarup Rasmussen (first round)
3. (Indonesia) Mohammad Ahsan / Hendra Setiawan (quarter-finals)
4. (Indonesia) Fajar Alfian / Muhammad Rian Ardianto (champions)
5. (China) Liu Cheng / Zhang Nan (first round)
6. (England) Marcus Ellis / Chris Langridge (semi-finals)
7. (Indonesia) Berry Angriawan / Hardianto (second round)
8. (Chinese Taipei) Lee Yang / Wang Chi-lin (final)

=== Finals ===
Semi-finals
(South Korea) Kim Gi-jung (South Korea) Lee Yong-dae	20	21	20
8	(Chinese Taipei) Lee Yang (Chinese Taipei) Wang Chi-lin	22	13	22
4	(Indonesia) Fajar Alfian (Indonesia) Muhammad Rian Ardianto	21	21
6	(England) Marcus Ellis (England) Chris Langridge	16	19

Final
8	(Chinese Taipei) Lee Yang (Chinese Taipei) Wang Chi-lin	19	16
4	(Indonesia) Fajar Alfian (Indonesia) Muhammad Rian Ardianto	21	21

=== Top half ===
==== Section 1 ====
First Round
PFQ	(India) A George (India) S Shukla	21	21
(Chinese Taipei) Lu C-y (Chinese Taipei) Yang P-h	16	9
(Japan) K Matsui (Japan) Y Takeuchi	21	19	19
(Malaysia) M Arif A L (Malaysia) N M Azriyn A	14	21	21
5	(China) Liu C (China) Zhang N	12	17
(Japan) H Okamura (Japan) M Onodera	21	21
(Netherlands) J Maas (Netherlands) R Tabeling	16	17
(South Korea) Kim G-j (South Korea) Lee Y-d	21	21

Second Round
PFQ	(India) A George (India) S Shukla	17	13
(Malaysia) M Arif A L (Malaysia) N M Azriyn A	21	21
(Japan) H Okamura (Japan) M Onodera	8	10
(South Korea) Kim G-j (South Korea) Lee Y-d	21	21

Quarter-finals
(Malaysia) M Arif A L (Malaysia) N M Azriyn A	21	20	15
(South Korea) Kim G-j (South Korea) Lee Y-d	18	22	21

==== Section 2 ====
First Round
3	(Indonesia) M Ahsan (Indonesia) H Setiawan	21	21
(Denmark) M Bay-Smidt (Denmark) L Mølhede	16	18
(Germany) M Lamsfuß (Germany) M Seidel	21	22
(India) Arjun M. R. (India) R Shlok	18	20
8	(Chinese Taipei) Lee Y (Chinese Taipei) Wang C-l	21	21
Q2	(Germany) D Hess (Germany) J Zurwonne	13	9
WC	(Switzerland) N A. Müller (Switzerland) J Scheiwiller	13	12
Q4	(India) K P Garaga (India) D Kapila	21	21

Second Round
3	(Indonesia) M Ahsan (Indonesia) H Setiawan	16	21	21
(Germany) M Lamsfuß (Germany) M Seidel	21	19	17
8	(Chinese Taipei) Lee Y (Chinese Taipei) Wang C-l	21	21
Q4	(India) K P Garaga (India) D Kapila	13	17

Quarter-finals
3	(Indonesia) M Ahsan (Indonesia) H Setiawan	26	7	12
8	(Chinese Taipei) Lee Y (Chinese Taipei) Wang C-l	24	21	21

=== Bottom half ===
==== Section 3 ====
First Round
(Netherlands) J Arends (Netherlands) R Jille	21	21	19
(Indonesia) W Nayaka (Indonesia) A Y Santoso	23	18	21
(Japan) A Koga (Japan) T Saito	16	21	13
7	(Indonesia) B Angriawan (Indonesia) Hardianto	21	19	21
(India) M Attri (India) B. S Reddy	21	17	10
(Denmark) D Daugaard (Denmark) F Søgaard	18	21	21
Q1	(Japan) M Kaneko (Japan) Y Kubota	14	17
4	(Indonesia) F Alfian (Indonesia) M R Ardianto	21	21

Second Round
(Indonesia) W Nayaka (Indonesia) A Y Santoso	21	10	22
7	(Indonesia) B Angriawan (Indonesia) Hardianto	19	21	20
(Denmark) D Daugaard (Denmark) F Søgaard	14	18
4	(Indonesia) F Alfian (Indonesia) M R Ardianto	21	21

Quarter-finals
(Indonesia) W Nayaka (Indonesia) A Yusuf	10	17
4	(Indonesia) F Alfian (Indonesia) M R Ardianto	21	21

==== Section 4 ====
First Round
(United States) P Chew (United States) R Chew	9	12
(England) B Lane (England) S Vendy	21	21
(France) T Gicquel (France) R Labar	21	18	15
6	(England) M Ellis (England) C Langridge	14	21	21
(Canada) J Ho-Shue (Canada) N Yakura	21	23
PFQ	(Germany) J R Jansen (Germany) P Käsbauer	18	21
Q3	(India) P Chopra (India) C Shetty	21	21
2	(Denmark) K Astrup (Denmark) A S Rasmussen	16	18

Second Round
(England) B Lane (England) S Vendy	20	16
6	(England) M Ellis (England) C Langridge	22	21
(Canada) J Ho-Shue (Canada) N Yakura	21	14	13
Q3	(India) P Chopra (India) C Shetty	18	21	21

Quarter-finals
6	(England) M Ellis (England) C Langridge	21	28
Q3	(India) P Chopra (India) C Shetty	11	26

== Women's doubles ==
=== Seeds ===
1. (China) Chen Qingchen / Jia Yifan (quarter-finals)
2. (Bulgaria) Gabriela Stoeva / Stefani Stoeva (semi-finals)
3. (Japan) Nami Matsuyama / Chiharu Shida (final)
4. (South Korea) Chang Ye-na / Jung Kyung-eun (champions)
5. (Denmark) Maiken Fruergaard / Sara Thygesen (withdrew)
6. (China) Li Wenmei / Zheng Yu (semi-finals)
7. (France) Émilie Lefel / Anne Tran (first round)
8. (Netherlands) Selena Piek / Cheryl Seinen (withdrew)

=== Finals ===
Semi-finals
6	(China) Li Wenmei (China) Zheng Yu	20	21	17
3	(Japan) Nami Matsuyama (Japan) Chiharu Shida	22	14	21
4	(South Korea) Chang Ye-na (South Korea) Jung Kyung-eun	21	21
2	(Bulgaria) Gabriela Stoeva (Bulgaria) Stefani Stoeva	19	10

Final
3	(Japan) Nami Matsuyama (Japan) Chiharu Shida	16	13
4	(South Korea) Chang Ye-na (South Korea) Jung Kyung-eun	21	21

=== Top half ===
==== Section 1 ====
First Round
1	(China) Chen QC (China) Jia YF	21	21
Q4	(Germany) J Petrikowski (Germany) F Volkmann	5	5
(United States) E Kan (United States) I Zhong	5	10
(Indonesia) A Imanuela (Indonesia) S F S Ramadhanti	21	21
6	(China) Li WM (China) Zheng Y	21	21
(Japan) S Hobara (Japan) N Sone	10	17
(Italy) S Garino (Italy) L Iversen	8	11
(Japan) A Araki (Japan) R Imai	21	21

Second Round
1	(China) Chen QC (China) Jia YF	21	21
(Indonesia) A Imanuela (Indonesia) S F S Ramadhanti	17	14
6	(China) Li WM (China) Zheng Y	21	16	21
(Japan) A Araki (Japan) R Imai	19	21	16

Quarter-finals
1	(China) Chen QC (China) Jia YF	21	14	14
6	(China) Li WM (China) Zheng Y	18	21	21

==== Section 2 ====
First Round
3	(Japan) N Matsuyama (Japan) C Shida	19	21	21
PFQ	(Germany) A Jäger (Germany) S Küspert	21	11	10
(Czech Republic) A Bášová (Czech Republic) M Fuchsová	6	10
(Germany) L Efler (Germany) I Herttrich	21	21
PFQ	(Switzerland) N Fankhauser (Netherlands) I Tabeling	12	21	21
(India) P Dandu (India) S Santosh	21	15	16
(India) A Ponnappa (India) N. S Reddy	21	21
(Russia) A Akchurina (Russia) O Morozova	16	17

Second Round
3	(Japan) N Matsuyama (Japan) C Shida	21	21
(Germany) L Efler (Germany) I Herttrich	17	18
PFQ	(Switzerland) N Fankhauser (Netherlands) I Tabeling	14	17
(India) A Ponnappa (India) N. S Reddy	21	21

Quarter-finals
3	(Japan) N Matsuyama (Japan) C Shida	21	21
(India) A Ponnappa (India) N. S Reddy	17	17

=== Bottom half ===
==== Section 3 ====
First Round
(England) C Birch (England) L Smith	17	21	21
(Canada) R Honderich (Canada) K Tsai	21	14	23
Q3	(Denmark) A Bøje (Denmark) M Poulsen	21	17	22
PFQ	(Chinese Taipei) Cheng C-y (Chinese Taipei) Lee C-c	19	21	20
Q2	(Denmark) J Finne-Ipsen (Denmark) M Surrow	14	22	14
(China) Chen L (China) Xu Y	21	20	21
(Denmark) A Magelund (Denmark) F Ravn	10	10
4	(South Korea) Chang Y-n (South Korea) Jung K-e	21	21

Second Round
(Canada) R Honderich (Canada) K Tsai	12	16
Q3	(Denmark) A Bøje (Denmark) M Poulsen	21	21
(China) Chen L (China) Xu Y	7	12
4	(South Korea) Chang Y-n (South Korea) Jung K-e	21	21

Quarter-finals
Q3	(Denmark) A Bøje (Denmark) M Poulsen	10	14
4	(South Korea) Chang Y-n (South Korea) Jung K-e	21	21

==== Section 4 ====
First Round
Q1	(Estonia) K-K Marran (Estonia) H Rüütel	11	13
(Chinese Taipei) Chang C-h (Chinese Taipei) Yang C-t	21	21
(Germany) J Goliszewski (Germany) L Käpplein	21	25
7	(France) É Lefel (France) A Tran	13	23
(Indonesia) Y Barkah (Indonesia) J F Sugiarto	21	21
(Japan) M Kashihara (Japan) M Kato	13	19
(Chinese Taipei) Hsu Y-c (Chinese Taipei) Hu L-f	18	12
2	(Bulgaria) G Stoeva (Bulgaria) S Stoeva	21	21

Second Round
(Chinese Taipei) Chang C-h (Chinese Taipei) Yang C-t	22	11
(Germany) J Goliszewski (Germany) L Käpplein	24	21
(Indonesia) Y Barkah (Indonesia) J F Sugiarto	20	12
2	(Bulgaria) G Stoeva (Bulgaria) S Stoeva	22	21

Quarter-finals
(Germany) J Goliszewski (Germany) L Käpplein	14	10
2	(Bulgaria) G Stoeva (Bulgaria) S Stoeva	21	21

== Mixed doubles ==
=== Seeds ===
1. (England) Chris Adcock / Gabby Adcock (withdrew)
2. (England) Marcus Ellis / Lauren Smith (quarter-finals)
3. (Denmark) Mathias Christiansen / Christinna Pedersen (quarter-finals)
4. (Germany) Mark Lamsfuß / Isabel Herttrich (quarter-finals)
5. (China) Lu Kai / Chen Lu (semi-finals)
6. (Denmark) Niclas Nøhr / Sara Thygesen (withdrew)
7. (Germany) Marvin Seidel / Linda Efler (second round)
8. (Indonesia) Rinov Rivaldy / Pitha Haningtyas Mentari (final)

=== Finals ===
Semi-finals
PFQ	(Denmark) Mathias Bay-Smidt (Denmark) Rikke Søby Hansen	20	21	23
5	(China) Lu Kai (China) Chen Lu	22	19	21
Q1	(Chinese Taipei) Lu Ching-yao (Chinese Taipei) Lee Chia-hsin	13	21	9
8	(Indonesia) Rinov Rivaldy (Indonesia) Pitha Haningtyas Mentari	21	19	21

Final
PFQ	(Denmark) Mathias Bay-Smidt (Denmark) Rikke Søby Hansen	21	12	21
8	(Indonesia) Rinov Rivaldy (Indonesia) Pitha Haningtyas Mentari	18	21	16

=== Top half ===
==== Section 1 ====
First Round
PFQ	(Germany) J R Jansen (Germany) K Ostermeyer	15	17
(India) P Chopra (India) N. S Reddy	21	21
(Chinese Taipei) Po L-w (Chinese Taipei) Chang C-h	16	18
(India) Arjun M. R. (India) K. Maneesha	21	21
PFQ	(Denmark) M Bay-Smidt (Denmark) R Søby Hansen	21	21
(Canada) N Yakura (Canada) K Tsai	15	15
PFQ	(Bulgaria) A Vlaar (Bulgaria) M Mitsova	10	21	21
Q4	(France) F Delrue (France) J Moinard	21	18	18

Second Round
(India) P Chopra (India) N. S Reddy	16	21	15
(India) Arjun M. R. (India) K. Maneesha	21	16	21
PFQ	(Denmark) M Bay-Smidt (Denmark) R Søby Hansen	17	21	27
PFQ	(Bulgaria) A Vlaar (Bulgaria) M Mitsova	21	19	25

Quarter-finals
(India) Arjun M. R. (India) K. Maneesha	19	16
PFQ	(Denmark) M Bay-Smidt (Denmark) R Søby Hansen	21	21

==== Section 2 ====
First Round
3	(Denmark) M Christiansen (Denmark) C Pedersen	21	21
PFQ	(Germany) J C Völker (Germany) E Janssens	19	9
(United States) M Fogarty (United States) I Zhong	7	5
(England) B Lane (England) J Pugh	21	21
5	(China) Lu K (China) Chen L	21	21
Q2	(Denmark) F Søgaard (Denmark) A Bøje	11	17
Q3	(Spain) A Zapico (Spain) L Uslé	21	17	21
(India) D Kapila (India) K Garg	13	21	19

Second Round
3	(Denmark) M Christiansen (Denmark) C Pedersen	18	21	24
(England) B Lane (England) J Pugh	21	16	22
5	(China) Lu K (China) Chen L	21	21
Q3	(Spain) A Zapico (Spain) L Uslé	11	8

Quarter-finals
3	(Denmark) M Christiansen (Denmark) C Pedersen	19	23	17
5	(China) Lu K (China) Chen L	21	21	21

=== Bottom half ===
==== Section 3 ====
First Round
(France) R Labar (France) A Tran	19	19
Q1	(Chinese Taipei) Lu C-y (Chinese Taipei) Lee C-h	21	21
(Netherlands) R Jille (Netherlands) I van der Aar	21	17	22
7	(Germany) M Seidel (Germany) L Efler	17	21	24
(Chinese Taipei) Chang K-c (Chinese Taipei) Lee C-c	12	19
(Chinese Taipei) Lee Y (Chinese Taipei) Yang C-t	21	21
(Chinese Taipei) Wang C-l (Chinese Taipei) Cheng C-y	17	12
4	(Germany) M Lamsfuß (Germany) I Herttrich	21	21

Second Round
Q1	(Chinese Taipei) Lu C-y (Chinese Taipei) Lee C-h	22	22	21
7	(Germany) M Seidel (Germany) L Efler	24	20	18
(Chinese Taipei) Lee Y (Chinese Taipei) Yang C-t	11	16
4	(Germany) M Lamsfuß (Germany) I Herttrich	21	21

Quarter-finals
Q1	(Chinese Taipei) Lu C-y (Chinese Taipei) Lee C-h	21	22
4	(Germany) M Lamsfuß (Germany) I Herttrich	18	20

==== Section 4 ====
First Round
(Indonesia) R Alexander (Indonesia) A Saufika	16	21	21
(Russia) E Dremin (Russia) E Dimova	21	15	16
(Czech Republic) J Bitman (Czech Republic) A Bášová	13	14
8	(Indonesia) R Rivaldy (Indonesia) P H Mentari	21	21
(Poland) P Śmiłowski (Poland) M Świerczyńska	21	19
(France) G Mittelheisser (France) A Mittelheisser	23	21
(Netherlands) J Arends (Netherlands) C Seinen	20	19
2	(England) M Ellis (England) L Smith	22	21

Second Round
(Indonesia) R Alexander (Indonesia) A Saufika	14	22
8	(Indonesia) R Rivaldy (Indonesia) P H Mentari	21	24
(France) G Mittelheisser (France) A Mittelheisser	13	15
2	(England) M Ellis (England) L Smith	21	21

Quarter-finals
8	(Indonesia) R Rivaldy (Indonesia) P H Mentari	19	21	21
2	(England) M Ellis (England) L Smith	21	14	17

Preceded by 2019 Lingshui China Masters	BWF World Tour; 2019 BWF season	Succeeded by 2019 Orléans Masters
