= 2020 Indonesia Masters =

2020 badminton tournament in Jakarta

Tournament details
- Dates: 14–19 January
- Edition: 10th
- Level: Super 500
- Total prize money: US$400,000
- Venue: Istora Gelora Bung Karno
- Location: Jakarta, Indonesia

Champions
- Men's singles: (Indonesia) Anthony Sinisuka Ginting
- Women's singles: (Thailand) Ratchanok Intanon
- Men's doubles: (Indonesia) Marcus Fernaldi Gideon (Indonesia) Kevin Sanjaya Sukamuljo
- Women's doubles: (Indonesia) Greysia Polii (Indonesia) Apriyani Rahayu
- Mixed doubles: (China) Zheng Siwei (China) Huang Yaqiong

The 2020 Indonesia Masters (officially known as the Daihatsu Indonesia Masters 2020 for sponsorship reasons) was a badminton tournament that took place at the Istora Gelora Bung Karno in Indonesia from 14 to 19 January 2020 and had a total purse of $400,000.

== Tournament ==
The 2020 Indonesia Masters was the second tournament of the 2020 BWF World Tour and also part of the Indonesia Masters championships, which had been held since 2010. This tournament was organized by the Badminton Association of Indonesia with sanction from the BWF.

=== Venue ===
This international tournament was held at the Istora Gelora Bung Karno in Jakarta, Indonesia.

=== Point distribution ===
Below is the point distribution for each phase of the tournament based on the BWF points system for the BWF World Tour Super 500 event.

Winner	Runner-up	3/4	5/8	9/16	17/32	33/64	65/128
9,200	7,800	6,420	5,040	3,600	2,220	880	430

=== Prize money ===
The total prize money for this tournament was US$400,000. Distribution of prize money was in accordance with BWF regulations.

Event	Winner	Finals	Semi-finals	Quarter-finals	Last 16
Singles	$30,000	$15,200	$5,800	$2,400	$1,400
Doubles	$31,600	$15,200	$5,600	$2,900	$1,500

== Men's singles ==
=== Seeds ===
1. (Japan) Kento Momota (withdrew)
2. (Chinese Taipei) Chou Tien-chen (first round)
3. (China) Chen Long (withdrew)
4. (Denmark) Anders Antonsen (final)
5. (Denmark) Viktor Axelsen (semi-finals)
6. (Indonesia) Jonatan Christie (quarter-finals)
7. (Indonesia) Anthony Sinisuka Ginting (champion)
8. (China) Shi Yuqi (quarter-finals)

=== Finals ===
Semi-finals
5	(Denmark) Viktor Axelsen	20	11
7	(Indonesia) Anthony Sinisuka Ginting	22	21
4	(Denmark) Anders Antonsen	21	21
(Hong Kong) Lee Cheuk Yiu	9	14

Final
7	(Indonesia) Anthony Sinisuka Ginting	17	21	21
4	(Denmark) Anders Antonsen	21	15	9

=== Top half ===
==== Section 1 ====
First Round
PFQ	(Singapore) Loh K Y	24	21
(Japan) K Tsuneyama	22	9
Q1	(China) Zhao JP	13	21	21
Q4	(Denmark) H-K Vittinghus	21	14	19
5	(Denmark) V Axelsen	21	21
(China) Lin D	12	14
(India) S Kidambi	21	12	14
(Indonesia) S H Rhustavito	18	21	21

Second Round
PFQ	(Singapore) Loh K Y	9	21
Q1	(China) Zhao JP	21	23
5	(Denmark) V Axelsen	21	21
(Indonesia) S H Rhustavito	17	14

Quarter-finals
Q1	(China) Zhao JP	22	13	7
5	(Denmark) V Axelsen	20	21	21

==== Section 2 ====
First Round
PFQ	(India) So Verma	21	15	10
(China) Lu GZ	17	21	21
PFQ	(China) Huang YX	17	23	21
(Malaysia) Lee Z J	21	21	12
7	(Indonesia) A S Ginting	21	21
(India) Parupalli K	14	12
(India) Sa Verma	17	21	10
(Indonesia) T Sugiarto	21	19	21

Second Round
(China) Lu GZ	18	21
PFQ	(China) Huang YX	21	23
7	(Indonesia) A S Ginting	21	21
(Indonesia) T Sugiarto	16	15

Quarter-finals
PFQ	(China) Huang YX	11	14
7	(Indonesia) A S Ginting	21	21

=== Bottom half ===
==== Section 3 ====
First Round
(Thailand) K Wangcharoen	12	16
(Chinese Taipei) Wang T-w	21	21
(India) Prannoy K	17	14
6	(Indonesia) J Christie	21	21
(Japan) K Nishimoto	21	21
(Denmark) R Gemke	15	18
(South Korea) Son W-h	10	18
4	(Denmark) A Antonsen	21	21

Second Round
(Chinese Taipei) Wang T-w	15	15
6	(Indonesia) J Christie	21	21
(Japan) K Nishimoto	21	21	13
4	(Denmark) A Antonsen	23	4	21

Quarter-finals
6	(Indonesia) J Christie	14	21	12
4	(Denmark) A Antonsen	21	10	21

==== Section 4 ====
First Round
(Denmark) J Ø. Jørgensen	21	16	18
(Hong Kong) Ng K L	18	21	21
(India) B. Sai Praneeth	21	18	10
8	(China) Shi YQ	16	21	21
Q2	(South Korea) Heo K-h	21	21	21
Q3	(France) B Leverdez	23	15	17
(Hong Kong) Lee C Y	21	21
2	(Chinese Taipei) Chou T-c	12	17

Second Round
(Hong Kong) Ng K L	29	10	18
8	(China) Shi YQ	27	21	21
Q2	(South Korea) Heo K-h	13	21	12
(Hong Kong) Lee C Y	21	15	21

Quarter-finals
8	(China) Shi YQ	17	17
(Hong Kong) Lee C Y	21	21

== Women's singles ==
=== Seeds ===
1. (China) Chen Yufei (first round)
2. (Japan) Akane Yamaguchi (second round)
3. (Japan) Nozomi Okuhara (second round)
4. (Thailand) Ratchanok Intanon (champion)
5. (India) P. V. Sindhu (second round)
6. (China) He Bingjiao (semi-finals)
7. (Canada) Michelle Li (quarter-finals)
8. (South Korea) An Se-young (quarter-finals)

=== Finals ===
Semi-finals
6	(China) He Bingjiao	11	19
(Spain) Carolina Marín	21	21
4	(Thailand) Ratchanok Intanon	21	23
(China) Wang Zhiyi	12	21

Final
(Spain) Carolina Marín	19	21	18
4	(Thailand) Ratchanok Intanon	21	11	21

=== Top half ===
==== Section 1 ====
First Round
1	(China) Chen YF	18	14
(Denmark) L Kjærsfeldt	21	21
Q4	(China) Zhang YM	18	21
(United States) B Zhang	21	23
6	(China) He BJ	21	21
Q2	(Thailand) P Buranaprasertsuk	19	18
(Hong Kong) Cheung N Y	15	15
(South Korea) Kim G-e	21	21

Second Round
(Denmark) L Kjærsfeldt	11	14
(United States) B Zhang	21	21
6	(China) He BJ	21	21
(South Korea) Kim G-e	17	17

Quarter-finals
(United States) B Zhang	16	20
6	(China) He BJ	21	22

==== Section 2 ====
First Round
3	(Japan) N Okuhara	21	21
(Russia) E Kosetskaya	16	13
(Spain) C Marín	21	21
(Thailand) N Jindapol	13	15
8	(South Korea) An S-y	21	12	21
(South Korea) Sung J-h	17	21	15
PFQ	(Scotland) K Gilmour	21	21
(Singapore) Yeo J M	15	14

Second Round
3	(Japan) N Okuhara	13	15
(Spain) C Marín	21	21
8	(South Korea) An S-y	21	21
PFQ	(Scotland) K Gilmour	14	15

Quarter-finals
(Spain) C Marín	21	21
8	(South Korea) An S-y	17	6

=== Bottom half ===
==== Section 3 ====
First Round
(Indonesia) Fitriani	6	17
(China) Han Y	21	21
Q3	(Indonesia) R Hartawan	14	15
7	(Canada) M Li	21	21
(Thailand) P Chochuwong	17	21	11
(Thailand) B Ongbamrungphan	21	16	21
(China) Cai YY	15	17
4	(Thailand) R Intanon	21	21

Second Round
(China) Han Y	14	17
7	(Canada) M Li	21	21
(Thailand) B Ongbamrungphan	16	20
4	(Thailand) R Intanon	21	22

Quarter-finals
7	(Canada) M Li	14	11
4	(Thailand) R Intanon	21	21

==== Section 4 ====
First Round
(Japan) S Takahashi	19	21	21
(India) S Nehwal	21	13	5
(Japan) A Ohori	21	15	11
5	(India) P. V. Sindhu	14	21	21
Q1	(Belgium) L Tan	6	13
(China) Wang ZY	21	21
(Indonesia) G M Tunjung	21	15	22
2	(Japan) A Yamaguchi	12	21	24

Second Round
(Japan) S Takahashi	16	21	21
5	(India) P. V. Sindhu	21	16	19
(China) Wang ZY	17	21	26
2	(Japan) A Yamaguchi	21	11	24

Quarter-finals
(Japan) S Takahashi	19	11
(China) Wang ZY	21	21

== Men's doubles ==
=== Seeds ===
1. (Indonesia) Marcus Fernaldi Gideon / Kevin Sanjaya Sukamuljo (champions)
2. (Indonesia) Mohammad Ahsan / Hendra Setiawan (final)
3. (Japan) Takeshi Kamura / Keigo Sonoda (withdrew)
4. (China) Li Junhui / Liu Yuchen (first round)
5. (Indonesia) Fajar Alfian / Muhammad Rian Ardianto (semi-finals)
6. (Japan) Hiroyuki Endo / Yuta Watanabe (withdrew)
7. (Chinese Taipei) Lee Yang / Wang Chi-lin (quarter-finals)
8. (Malaysia) Aaron Chia / Soh Wooi Yik (semi-finals)

=== Finals ===
Semi-finals
1	(Indonesia) Marcus Fernaldi Gideon (Indonesia) Kevin Sanjaya Sukamuljo	21	21
8	(Malaysia) Aaron Chia (Malaysia) Soh Wooi Yik	19	19
5	(Indonesia) Fajar Alfian (Indonesia) Muhammad Rian Ardianto	12	21	17
2	(Indonesia) Mohammad Ahsan (Indonesia) Hendra Setiawan	21	18	21

Final
1	(Indonesia) Marcus Fernaldi Gideon (Indonesia) Kevin Sanjaya Sukamuljo	21	21
2	(Indonesia) Mohammad Ahsan (Indonesia) Hendra Setiawan	15	16

=== Top half ===
==== Section 1 ====
First Round
1	(Indonesia) M F Gideon (Indonesia) K S Sukamuljo	21	19	26
(England) M Ellis (England) C Langridge	12	21	24
(Japan) T Hoki (Japan) Y Kobayashi	10	14
(China) He JT (China) Tan Q	21	21
PFQ	(China) Di ZJ (China) Wang C	21	21
(China) Huang KX (China) Liu C	13	11
(Malaysia) Goh S F (Malaysia) N Izzuddin	21	18	21
(Russia) V Ivanov (Russia) I Sozonov	15	21	16

Second Round
1	(Indonesia) M F Gideon (Indonesia) K S Sukamuljo	21	21
(China) He JT (China) Tan Q	19	13
PFQ	(China) Di ZJ (China) Wang C	14	18
(Malaysia) Goh S F (Malaysia) N Izzuddin	21	21

Quarter-finals
1	(Indonesia) M F Gideon (Indonesia) K S Sukamuljo	21	23
(Malaysia) Goh S F (Malaysia) N Izzuddin	13	21

==== Section 2 ====
First Round
PFQ	(Canada) J Ho-Shue (Canada) N Yakura	20	21
Q1	(Germany) J R Jansen (Germany) P Käsbauer	22	23
(Malaysia) Ong Y S (Malaysia) Teo E Y	21	21
(China) Han CK (China) Zhou HD	18	17
8	(Malaysia) A Chia (Malaysia) Soh W Y	21	22
(Indonesia) W Nayaka (Indonesia) A Yusuf	17	20
(Denmark) M Boe (Denmark) M Conrad-Petersen	21	22
(Chinese Taipei) Lee J-h (Chinese Taipei) Yang P-hs	14	20

Second Round
Q1	(Germany) J R Jansen (Germany) P Käsbauer	17	12
(Malaysia) Ong Y S (Malaysia) Teo E Y	21	21
8	(Malaysia) A Chia (Malaysia) Soh W Y	21	21
(Denmark) M Boe (Denmark) M Conrad-Petersen	15	13

Quarter-finals
(Malaysia) Ong Y S (Malaysia) Teo E Y	26	19
8	(Malaysia) A Chia (Malaysia) Soh W Y	28	21

=== Bottom half ===
==== Section 3 ====
First Round
(South Korea) Choi S-g (South Korea) Seo S-j	14	21	20
(China) Ou XY (China) Zhang N	21	13	22
(Japan) A Koga (Japan) T Saito	19	21	13
5	(Indonesia) F Alfian (Indonesia) M R Ardianto	21	16	21
(Denmark) K Astrup (Denmark) A S Rasmussen	21	21
Q3	(Netherlands) J Maas (Netherlands) R Tabeling	16	16
Q4	(South Korea) Kim G-j (South Korea) Lee Y-d	21	21
4	(China) Li JH (China) Liu YC	19	12

Second Round
(China) Ou XY (China) Zhang N	10	21	19
5	(Indonesia) F Alfian (Indonesia) M R Ardianto	21	12	21
(Denmark) K Astrup (Denmark) A S Rasmussen	21	21
Q4	(South Korea) Kim G-j (South Korea) Lee Y-d	14	7

Quarter-finals
5	(Indonesia) F Alfian (Indonesia) M R Ardianto	18	21	21
(Denmark) K Astrup (Denmark) A S Rasmussen	21	13	17

==== Section 4 ====
First Round
(Malaysia) Goh V S (Malaysia) Tan W K	21	21
(Chinese Taipei) Liao M-c (Chinese Taipei) Su C-h	18	17
Q2	(South Korea) Kang M-h (South Korea) Kim J-h	21	19	18
7	(Chinese Taipei) Lee Y (Chinese Taipei) Wang C-l	18	21	21
(England) B Lane (England) S Vendy	17	18
(Chinese Taipei) Lu C-y (Chinese Taipei) Yang P-ha	21	21
(India) S Rankireddy (India) C Shetty	20	15
2	(Indonesia) M Ahsan (Indonesia) H Setiawan	22	21

Second Round
(Malaysia) Goh V S (Malaysia) Tan W K	13	21	17
7	(Chinese Taipei) Lee Y (Chinese Taipei) Wang C-l	21	16	21
(Chinese Taipei) Lu C-y (Chinese Taipei) Yang P-ha	19	20
2	(Indonesia) M Ahsan (Indonesia) H Setiawan	21	22

Quarter-finals
7	(Chinese Taipei) Lee Y (Chinese Taipei) Wang C-l	21	15	19
2	(Indonesia) M Ahsan (Indonesia) H Setiawan	9	21	21

== Women's doubles ==
=== Seeds ===
1. (China) Chen Qingchen / Jia Yifan (second round)
2. (Japan) Yuki Fukushima / Sayaka Hirota (second round)
3. (Japan) Mayu Matsumoto / Wakana Nagahara (second round)
4. (Japan) Misaki Matsutomo / Ayaka Takahashi (semi-finals)
5. (South Korea) Kim So-yeong / Kong Hee-yong (semi-finals)
6. (South Korea) Lee So-hee / Shin Seung-chan (quarter-finals)
7. (China) Du Yue / Li Yinhui (second round)
8. (Indonesia) Greysia Polii / Apriyani Rahayu (champions)

=== Finals ===
Semi-finals
8	(Indonesia) Greysia Polii (Indonesia) Apriyani Rahayu	21	21
5	(South Korea) Kim So-yeong (South Korea) Kong Hee-yong	19	15
4	(Japan) Misaki Matsutomo (Japan) Ayaka Takahashi	20	20
(Denmark) Maiken Fruergaard (Denmark) Sara Thygesen	22	22

Final
8	(Indonesia) Greysia Polii (Indonesia) Apriyani Rahayu	18	21	23
(Denmark) Maiken Fruergaard (Denmark) Sara Thygesen	21	11	21

=== Top half ===
==== Section 1 ====
First Round
1	(China) Chen QC (China) Jia YF	21	21
(Malaysia) V Hoo K M (Malaysia) Yap C W	12	16
PFQ	(Germany) L Efler (Germany) I Herttrich	18	20
(Japan) N Matsuyama (Japan) C Shida	21	22
8	(Indonesia) G Polii (Indonesia) A Rahayu	22	21	21
(China) Liu XX (China) Xia YT	24	17	15
(France) D Delrue (France) L Palermo	17	21	12
(Canada) R Honderich (Canada) K Tsai	21	19	21

Second Round
1	(China) Chen QC (China) Jia YF	14	21	19
(Japan) N Matsuyama (Japan) C Shida	21	11	21
8	(Indonesia) G Polii (Indonesia) A Rahayu	21	21
(Canada) R Honderich (Canada) K Tsai	19	10

Quarter-finals
(Japan) N Matsuyama (Japan) C Shida	15	16
8	(Indonesia) G Polii (Indonesia) A Rahayu	21	21

==== Section 2 ====
First Round
3	(Japan) M Matsumoto (Japan) W Nagahara	w	/	o
(Netherlands) S Piek (Netherlands) C Seinen
(Bulgaria) G Stoeva (Bulgaria) S Stoeva	15	12
(South Korea) Chang Y-n (South Korea) Kim H-r	21	21
5	(South Korea) Kim S-y (South Korea) Kong H-y	21	23
(Chinese Taipei) Hsu Y-c (Chinese Taipei) Hu L-f	9	21
Q1	(Indonesia) N K M Istarani (Indonesia) T O Kusumah	21	21
Q3	(Indonesia) S F S Ramadhanti (Indonesia) R Sugiarto	18	18

Second Round
3	(Japan) M Matsumoto (Japan) W Nagahara	18	20
(South Korea) Chang Y-n (South Korea) Kim H-r	21	22
5	(South Korea) Kim S-y (South Korea) Kong H-y	21	21
Q1	(Indonesia) N K M Istarani (Indonesia) T O Kusumah	13	15

Quarter-finals
(South Korea) Chang Y-n (South Korea) Kim H-r	14	21	22
5	(South Korea) Kim S-y (South Korea) Kong H-y	21	16	24

=== Bottom half ===
==== Section 3 ====
First Round
(Thailand) J Kititharakul (Thailand) R Prajongjai	18	15
(South Korea) Baek H-n (South Korea) Jung K-e	21	21
Q2	(Denmark) A Bøje (Denmark) M Poulsen	13	18
6	(South Korea) Lee S-h (South Korea) Shin S-c	21	21
Q4	(Chinese Taipei) Chang C-h (Chinese Taipei) Yang C-t	14	16
(Malaysia) Chow M K (Malaysia) Lee M Y	21	21
(Australia) S Mapasa (Australia) G Somerville	13	21	9
4	(Japan) M Matsutomo (Japan) A Takahashi	21	17	21

Second Round
(South Korea) Baek H-n (South Korea) Jung K-e	19	30	15
6	(South Korea) Lee S-h (South Korea) Shin S-c	21	29	21
(Malaysia) Chow M K (Malaysia) Lee M Y	16	12
4	(Japan) M Matsutomo (Japan) A Takahashi	21	21

Quarter-finals
6	(South Korea) Lee S-h (South Korea) Shin S-c	21	25	6
4	(Japan) M Matsutomo (Japan) A Takahashi	23	23	21

==== Section 4 ====
First Round
(China) Dong WJ (China) Feng XY	12	9
(Thailand) P Supajikarul (Thailand) S Taerattanachai	21	21
(Russia) E Bolotova (Russia) A Davletova	15	14
7	(China) Du Y (China) Li YH	21	21
(England) C Birch (England) L Smith	14	14
(Denmark) M Fruergaard (Denmark) S Thygesen	21	21
(China) Li WM (China) Zheng Y	16	16
2	(Japan) Y Fukushima (Japan) S Hirota	21	21

Second Round
(Thailand) P Supajikarul (Thailand) S Taerattanachai	21	21
7	(China) Du Y (China) Li YH	16	13
(Denmark) M Fruergaard (Denmark) S Thygesen	18	23	21
2	(Japan) Y Fukushima (Japan) S Hirota	21	21	10

Quarter-finals
(Thailand) P Supajikarul (Thailand) S Taerattanachai	15	20
(Denmark) M Fruergaard (Denmark) S Thygesen	21	22

== Mixed doubles ==
=== Seeds ===
1. (China) Zheng Siwei / Huang Yaqiong (champions)
2. (China) Wang Yilyu / Huang Dongping (final)
3. (Japan) Yuta Watanabe / Arisa Higashino (withdrew)
4. (Thailand) Dechapol Puavaranukroh / Sapsiree Taerattanachai (second round)
5. (Indonesia) Praveen Jordan / Melati Daeva Oktavianti (quarter-finals)
6. (Malaysia) Chan Peng Soon / Goh Liu Ying (quarter-finals)
7. (South Korea) Seo Seung-jae / Chae Yoo-jung (first round)
8. (Malaysia) Goh Soon Huat / Shevon Jemie Lai (second round)

=== Finals ===
Semi-finals
1	(China) Zheng Siwei (China) Huang Yaqiong	21	21
(Malaysia) Tan Kian Meng (Malaysia) Lai Pei Jing	15	15
(France) Thom Gicquel (France) Delphine Delrue	19	16
2	(China) Wang Yilyu (China) Huang Dongping	21	21

Final
1	(China) Zheng Siwei (China) Huang Yaqiong	21	21
2	(China) Wang Yilyu (China) Huang Dongping	9	9

=== Top half ===
==== Section 1 ====
First Round
1	(China) Zheng SW (China) Huang YQ	21	21
(Indonesia) H Faizal (Indonesia) G E Widjaja	14	13
(Hong Kong) Tang C M (Hong Kong) Tse Y S	14	17
(Denmark) M Christiansen (Denmark) A Bøje	21	21
6	(Malaysia) Chan P S (Malaysia) Goh L Y	21	21
(Germany) M Lamsfuß (Germany) I Herttrich	17	17
(Indonesia) R Rivaldy (Indonesia) P H Mentari	15	13
(Chinese Taipei) Lee J-h (Chinese Taipei) Hsu Y-c	21	21

Second Round
1	(China) Zheng SW (China) Huang YQ	21	21
(Denmark) M Christiansen (Denmark) A Bøje	14	11
6	(Malaysia) Chan P S (Malaysia) Goh L Y	21	21
(Chinese Taipei) Lee J-h (Chinese Taipei) Hsu Y-c	15	17

Quarter-finals
1	(China) Zheng SW (China) Huang YQ	21	21
6	(Malaysia) Chan P S (Malaysia) Goh L Y	14	13

==== Section 2 ====
First Round
PFQ	(Indonesia) A Maulana (Indonesia) M C Bandaso	14	12
(Malaysia) Tan K M (Malaysia) Lai P J	21	21
(Canada) J Hurlburt-Yu (Canada) J Wu	13	21	16
Q1	(Indonesia) A E Prasetya (Indonesia) A Saufika	21	19	21
8	(Malaysia) Goh S H (Malaysia) S J Lai	21	21
Q4	(Denmark) N Nøhr (Denmark) S Thygesen	13	6
Q2	(South Korea) Ko S-h (South Korea) Eom H-w	21	21
(India) P Chopra (India) N. S Reddy	8	14

Second Round
(Malaysia) Tan K M (Malaysia) Lai P J	21	21
Q1	(Indonesia) A E Prasetya (Indonesia) A Saufika	13	11
8	(Malaysia) Goh S H (Malaysia) S J Lai	15	14
Q2	(South Korea) Ko S-h (South Korea) Eom H-w	21	21

Quarter-finals
(Malaysia) Tan K M (Malaysia) Lai P J	21	21
Q2	(South Korea) Ko S-h (South Korea) Eom H-w	7	18

=== Bottom half ===
==== Section 3 ====
First Round
(Republic of Ireland) S Magee (Republic of Ireland) C Magee	10	15
PFQ	(Chinese Taipei) Lee Y (Chinese Taipei) Yang C-t	21	21
(Netherlands) R Tabeling (Netherlands) S Piek
5	(Indonesia) P Jordan (Indonesia) M D Oktavianti	w	/	o
(Chinese Taipei) Wang C-l (Chinese Taipei) Cheng C-y	21	17	8
(France) T Gicquel (France) D Delrue	14	21	21
(China) He JT (China) Du Y	12	12
4	(Thailand) D Puavaranukroh (Thailand) S Taerattanachai	21	21

Second Round
PFQ	(Chinese Taipei) Lee Y (Chinese Taipei) Yang C-t	22	12	12
5	(Indonesia) P Jordan (Indonesia) M D Oktavianti	20	21	21
(France) T Gicquel (France) D Delrue	21	21
4	(Thailand) D Puavaranukroh (Thailand) S Taerattanachai	11	16

Quarter-finals
5	(Indonesia) P Jordan (Indonesia) M D Oktavianti	19	21	18
(France) T Gicquel (France) D Delrue	21	14	21

==== Section 4 ====
First Round
(Japan) T Hoki (Japan) W Nagahara	21	16	20
(England) C Adcock (England) G Adcock	19	21	22
Q3	(Indonesia) T Ahmad (Indonesia) A Rahayu	6
7	(South Korea) Seo S-j (South Korea) Chae Y-j	1^{r}
(England) M Ellis (England) L Smith	21	21
(Russia) R Alimov (Russia) A Davletova	17	10
(Indonesia) R Karanda Suwardi (Indonesia) P Z Bernadeth	9	15
2	(China) Wang YL (China) Huang DP	21	21

Second Round
(England) C Adcock (England) G Adcock	21	21
Q3	(Indonesia) T Ahmad (Indonesia) A Rahayu	9	12
(England) M Ellis (England) L Smith	15	12
2	(China) Wang YL (China) Huang DP	21	21

Quarter-finals
(England) C Adcock (England) G Adcock	21	18	15
2	(China) Wang YL (China) Huang DP	14	21	21

Preceded by 2020 Malaysia Masters	BWF World Tour; 2020 BWF season	Succeeded by 2020 Thailand Masters
