= 2022 German Open (badminton) =

Badminton tournament in Mülheim

Tournament details
- Dates: 8–13 March
- Edition: 63rd
- Level: Super 300
- Total prize money: US$180,000
- Venue: Westenergie Sporthalle
- Location: Mülheim, Germany

Champions
- Men's singles: (Thailand) Kunlavut Vitidsarn
- Women's singles: (China) He Bingjiao
- Men's doubles: (Malaysia) Goh Sze Fei (Malaysia) Nur Izzuddin
- Women's doubles: (China) Chen Qingchen (China) Jia Yifan
- Mixed doubles: (Thailand) Dechapol Puavaranukroh (Thailand) Sapsiree Taerattanachai

The 2022 German Open (officially known as the Yonex Gainward German Open 2022 for sponsorship reasons) was a badminton tournament that took place at the Westenergie Sporthalle in Mülheim, Germany, from 8 to 13 March 2022 and had a total prize pool of $180,000.

== Tournament ==
The 2022 German Open was the fourth tournament of the 2022 BWF World Tour and was part of the German Open championships, which had been held since 1955. The tournament was organized by Vermarktungsgesellschaft Badminton Deutschland (VBD) mbH for the German Badminton Association with sanction from the Badminton World Federation.

=== Venue ===
This international tournament was held at the Westenergie Sporthalle at Mülheim, Germany.

=== Point distribution ===
Below is the point distribution table for each phase of the tournament based on the BWF points system for the BWF World Tour Super 300 event.

| Winner | Runner-up | 3/4 | 5/8 | 9/16 | 17/32 |
|---|---|---|---|---|---|
| 7,000 | 5,950 | 4,900 | 3,850 | 2,750 | 1,670 |

=== Prize pool ===
The total prize money for this tournament was US$180,000. The distribution of the prize money was in accordance with BWF regulations.

| Event | Winner | Finalist | Semi-finals | Quarter-finals | Last 16 |
| Singles | $13,500 | $6,840 | $2,610 | $1,080 | $630 |
| Doubles | $14,220 | $6,840 | $2,520 | $1,305 | $675 |

== Men's singles ==
=== Seeds ===
1. (Denmark) Viktor Axelsen (semi-finals)
2. (Japan) Kento Momota (first round)
3. (Denmark) Anders Antonsen (withdrew)
4. (Indonesia) Anthony Sinisuka Ginting (second round)
5. (Malaysia) Lee Zii Jia (semi-finals)
6. (Indonesia) Jonatan Christie (second round)
7. (Hong Kong) Ng Ka Long (first round)
8. (India) Srikanth Kidambi (quarter-finals)

=== Finals ===
Semi-finals
1 | (Denmark) Viktor Axelsen | 13 | 21 | 20
(India) Lakshya Sen | 21 | 12 | 22
5 | (Malaysia) Lee Zii Jia | 13 | 12
(Thailand) Kunlavut Vitidsarn | 21 | 21

Final
(India) Lakshya Sen | 18 | 15
(Thailand) Kunlavut Vitidsarn | 21 | 21

=== Top half ===
==== Section 1 ====
First round
1 | (Denmark) V Axelsen | 21 | 21
PFR | (Germany) M Weißkirchen | 11 | 14
(Republic of Ireland) N Nguyen | 16 | 14
(France) T J Popov | 21 | 21
8 | (India) S Kidambi | 21 | 13 | 21
(France) B Leverdez | 10 | 21 | 7
(France) T Rouxel | 13 | 8
(China) Lu GZ | 21 | 21

Second round
1 | (Denmark) V Axelsen | 21 | 21
(France) T J Popov | 17 | 10
8 | (India) S Kidambi | 21 | 21 | 21
(China) Lu GZ | 16 | 23 | 18

Quarter-finals
1 | (Denmark) V Axelsen | 21 | 23
8 | (India) S Kidambi | 10 | 21

==== Section 2 ====
First round
4 | (Indonesia) A S Ginting | 21 | 23
PFR | (Spain) P Abián | 14 | 21
(India) L Sen | 21 | 22
(Thailand) K Wangcharoen | 6 | 20
7 | (Hong Kong) Ng K L | 14 | 19
(India) Prannoy K | 21 | 21
(Hong Kong) Lee C Y | 21 | 14 | 21
(Indonesia) S H Rhustavito | 16 | 21 | 18

Second round
4 | (Indonesia) A S Ginting | 7 | 9
(India) L Sen | 21 | 21
(India) Prannoy K | 21 | 24
(Hong Kong) Lee C Y | 19 | 22

Quarter-finals
(India) L Sen | 21 | 21
(India) Prannoy K | 15 | 16

=== Bottom half ===
==== Section 3 ====
First round
(Israel) M Zilberman | 19 | 18
PFR | (France) C Popov | 21 | 21
(Netherlands) M Caljouw | 21 | 13 | 8
5 | (Malaysia) Lee Z J | 19 | 21 | 21
(China) Zhao JP | 21 | 21
PFR | (India) S Dey | 15 | 8
(South Korea) Heo K-h | 21 | 18 | 21
PFR | (Finland) K Koljonen | 13 | 21 | 16

Second round
PFR | (France) C Popov | 13 | 21 | 12
5 | (Malaysia) Lee Z J | 21 | 18 | 21
(China) Zhao JP | 21 | 21
(South Korea) Heo K-h | 10 | 10

Quarter-finals
5 | (Malaysia) Lee Z J | 21 | 21
(China) Zhao JP | 12 | 18

==== Section 4 ====
First round
(India) Parupalli K | 13 | 13
(Thailand) K Vitidsarn | 21 | 21
PFR | (China) Li SF | 16 | 21 | 15
6 | (Indonesia) J Christie | 21 | 18 | 21
(Singapore) Loh K Y | 21 | 16 | 18
(Canada) B Yang | 12 | 21 | 21
(Japan) K Nishimoto | 23 | 21
2 | (Japan) K Momota | 21 | 9

Second round
(Thailand) K Vitidsarn | 22 | 21
6 | (Indonesia) J Christie | 20 | 9
(Canada) B Yang | 19 | 11
(Japan) K Nishimoto | 21 | 21

Quarter-finals
(Thailand) K Vitidsarn | 19 | 21 | 21
(Japan) K Nishimoto | 21 | 18 | 18

== Women's singles ==
=== Seeds ===
1. (Chinese Taipei) Tai Tzu-ying (second round)
2. (Japan) Akane Yamaguchi (second round)
3. (China) Chen Yufei (final)
4. (South Korea) An Se-young (semi-finals)
5. (Japan) Nozomi Okuhara (withdrew)
6. (Spain) Carolina Marín (withdrew)
7. (India) P. V. Sindhu (second round)
8. (Thailand) Ratchanok Intanon (quarter-finals)

=== Finals ===
Semi-finals
(China) Zhang Yiman | 13 | 21 | 13
3 | (China) Chen Yufei | 21 | 19 | 21
4 | (South Korea) An Se-young | 12 | 15
(China) He Bingjiao | 21 | 21

Final
3 | (China) Chen Yufei | 14 | 25
(China) He Bingjiao | 21 | 27

=== Top half ===
==== Section 1 ====
First round
1 | (Chinese Taipei) Tai T-y | 21 | 21
(United States) I Wang | 11 | 15
(France) Qi XF | 11 | 14^{r}
(Japan) S Takahashi | 21 | 14
7 | (India) P. V. Sindhu | 21 | 21
(Thailand) B Ongbamrungphan | 8 | 7
(China) Zhang YM | 21 | 21
PFR | (Spain) B Corrales | 15 | 14

Second round
1 | (Chinese Taipei) Tai T-y | 15 | 18
(Japan) S Takahashi | 21 | 21
7 | (India) P. V. Sindhu | 14 | 21 | 14
(China) Zhang YM | 21 | 15 | 21

Quarter-finals
(Japan) S Takahashi | 19 | 19
(China) Zhang YM | 21 | 21

==== Section 2 ====
First round
3 | (China) Chen YF | 21 | 21
(Thailand) P Chaiwan | 13 | 9
(Thailand) S Katethong | 21 | 11 | 21
(Scotland) K Gilmour | 16 | 21 | 18
PFR | (Italy) J Mair | 8 | 8
(Belgium) L Tan | 21 | 21
(Germany) Y Li | 16 | 21 | 21
(Denmark) J D Jakobsen | 21 | 14 | 14

Second round
3 | (China) Chen YF | 21 | 21
(Thailand) S Katethong | 8 | 15
(Belgium) L Tan | 21 | 12 | 15
(Germany) Y Li | 16 | 21 | 21

Quarter-finals
3 | (China) Chen YF | 21 | 21
(Germany) Y Li | 5 | 16

=== Bottom half ===
==== Section 3 ====
First round
(Denmark) L Kjærsfeldt | 21 | 21
PFR | (India) A Kashyap | 15 | 14
(Canada) M Li | 21 | 20 | 21
PFR | (India) M Bansod | 18 | 22 | 9
PFR | (France) L Huet | 22 | 8 | 7
(China) Han Y | 20 | 21 | 21
(Denmark) L Christophersen | 16 | 11
4 | (South Korea) An S-y | 21 | 21

Second round
(Denmark) L Kjærsfeldt | 17 | 19
(Canada) M Li | 21 | 21
(China) Han Y | 19 | 24 | 15
4 | (South Korea) An S-y | 21 | 22 | 21

Quarter-finals
(Canada) M Li | 11 | 13
4 | (South Korea) An S-y | 21 | 21

==== Section 4 ====
First round
PFR | (Spain) C Azurmendi | 15 | 21 | 14
(India) S Nehwal | 21 | 17 | 21
(China) Wang ZY | 11 | 18
8 | (Thailand) R Intanon | 21 | 21
(Japan) A Ohori | 20 | 17
(China) He BJ | 22 | 21
PFR | (Estonia) K Kuuba | 6 | 14
2 | (Japan) A Yamaguchi | 21 | 21

Second round
(India) S Nehwal | 10 | 15
8 | (Thailand) R Intanon | 21 | 21
(China) He BJ | 21 | 21
2 | (Japan) A Yamaguchi | 17 | 11

Quarter-finals
8 | (Thailand) R Intanon
(China) He BJ | w | / | o

== Men's doubles ==
=== Seeds ===
1. (Japan) Takuro Hoki / Yugo Kobayashi (quarter-finals)
2. (Malaysia) Aaron Chia / Soh Wooi Yik (withdrew)
3. (India) Satwiksairaj Rankireddy / Chirag Shetty (withdrew)
4. (Indonesia) Fajar Alfian / Muhammad Rian Ardianto (second round)
5. (Denmark) Kim Astrup / Anders Skaarup Rasmussen (semi-finals)
6. (Malaysia) Ong Yew Sin / Teo Ee Yi (quarter-finals)
7. (Russia) Vladimir Ivanov / Ivan Sozonov (Banned)
8. (Germany) Mark Lamsfuß / Marvin Seidel (second round)

=== Finals ===
Semi-finals
5 | (Denmark) Kim Astrup (Denmark) Anders Skaarup Rasmussen | 18 | 17
(China) Liu Yuchen (China) Ou Xuanyi | 21 | 21
(China) He Jiting (China) Zhou Haodong | 12 | 18
(Malaysia) Goh Sze Fei (Malaysia) Nur Izzuddin | 21 | 21

Final
(China) Liu Yuchen (China) Ou Xuanyi | 21 | 21 | 14
(Malaysia) Goh Sze Fei (Malaysia) Nur Izzuddin | 23 | 16 | 21

=== Top half ===
==== Section 1 ====
First round
1 | (Japan) T Hoki (Japan) Y Kobayashi | 21 | 21
(Malaysia) Tan K M (Malaysia) Tan W K | 13 | 13
(Netherlands) R Jille (Netherlands) T van der Lecq | 15 | 21 | 21
(France) C Popov (France) T J Popov | 21 | 17 | 19
5 | (Denmark) K Astrup (Denmark) A S Rasmussen | 21 | 17 | 21
(Scotland) C Grimley (Scotland) M Grimley | 13 | 21 | 11
(Thailand) S Jomkoh (Thailand) K Kedren | 21 | 21
(China) Liu C (China) Zhang N | 19 | 19

Second round
1 | (Japan) T Hoki (Japan) Y Kobayashi | 21 | 21
(Netherlands) R Jille (Netherlands) T van der Lecq | 17 | 12
5 | (Denmark) K Astrup (Denmark) A S Rasmussen | 21 | 21
(Thailand) S Jomkoh (Thailand) K Kedren | 13 | 17

Quarter-finals
1 | (Japan) T Hoki (Japan) Y Kobayashi | 24 | 21 | 21
5 | (Denmark) K Astrup (Denmark) A S Rasmussen | 26 | 19 | 23

==== Section 2 ====
First round
PFR | (Denmark) R Kjær (Denmark) F Søgaard | 15 | 20
(China) Liu YC (China) Ou XY | 21 | 22
(China) Ren XY (China) Tan Q | 18 | 21 | 15
(Japan) A Koga (Japan) T Saito | 21 | 12 | 21
8 | (Germany) M Lamsfuß (Germany) M Seidel | 21 | 23
(France) L Corvée (France) R Labar | 18 | 21
(Republic of Ireland) J Magee (Republic of Ireland) P Reynolds | 14 | 11
(Japan) K Matsui (Japan) Y Takeuchi | 21 | 21

Second round
(China) Liu YC (China) Ou XY | 21 | 21
(Japan) A Koga (Japan) T Saito | 18 | 15
8 | (Germany) M Lamsfuß (Germany) M Seidel | 21 | 22 | 19
(Japan) K Matsui (Japan) Y Takeuchi | 19 | 24 | 21

Quarter-finals
(China) Liu YC (China) Ou XY | 21 | 21
(Japan) K Matsui (Japan) Y Takeuchi | 12 | 16

=== Bottom half ===
==== Section 3 ====
First round
(India) K P Garaga (India) V G Panjala | 24 | 21
(Japan) H Okamura (Japan) M Onodera | 22 | 11
(England) C Hemming (England) S Stallwood | 15 | 16
PFR | (India) I Bhatnagar (India) K. Sai Pratheek | 21 | 21
(France) F Delrue (France) W Villeger | 15 | 16
(China) He JT (China) Zhou HD | 21 | 21
(Denmark) J Bay (Denmark) L Mølhede | 14 | 21 | 14
4 | (Indonesia) F Alfian (Indonesia) M R Ardianto | 21 | 9 | 21

Second round
(India) K P Garaga (India) V G Panjala | 23 | 16 | 21
PFR | (India) I Bhatnagar (India) K. Sai Pratheek | 21 | 21 | 14
(China) He JT (China) Zhou HD | 21 | 17 | 21
4 | (Indonesia) F Alfian (Indonesia) M R Ardianto | 15 | 21 | 14

Quarter-finals
(India) K P Garaga (India) V G Panjala | 11 | 21
(China) He JT (China) Zhou HD | 21 | 23

==== Section 4 ====
First round
(Scotland) A Dunn (Scotland) A Hall | 16 | 19
(England) B Lane (England) S Vendy | 21 | 21
(India) Arjun M.R. (India) D Kapila | 13 | 22 | 19
6 | (Malaysia) Ong Y S (Malaysia) Teo E Y | 21 | 20 | 21
(Malaysia) Man W C (Malaysia) Tee K W | 13 | 17
(Malaysia) Goh S F (Malaysia) N Izzuddin | 21 | 21
PFR | (Algeria) K Mammeri (Algeria) Y S Medel
PFR | (Denmark) J Eipe (Denmark) D Lundgaard | w | / | o

Second round
(England) B Lane (England) S Vendy | 15 | 21 | 17
6 | (Malaysia) Ong Y S (Malaysia) Teo E Y | 21 | 14 | 21
(Malaysia) Goh S F (Malaysia) N Izzuddin | 21 | 21
PFR | (Denmark) J Eipe (Denmark) D Lundgaard | 13 | 14

Quarter-finals
6 | (Malaysia) Ong Y S (Malaysia) Teo E Y | 15 | 22 | 19
(Malaysia) Goh S F (Malaysia) N Izzuddin | 21 | 20 | 21

== Women's doubles ==
=== Seeds ===
1. (China) Chen Qingchen / Jia Yifan (champions)
2. (South Korea) Lee So-hee / Shin Seung-chan (second round)
3. (South Korea) Kim So-yeong / Kong Hee-yong (quarter-finals)
4. (Japan) Mayu Matsumoto / Wakana Nagahara (withdrew)
5. (Japan) Nami Matsuyama / Chiharu Shida (second round)
6. (Thailand) Jongkolphan Kititharakul / Rawinda Prajongjai (semi-finals)
7. (Bulgaria) Gabriela Stoeva / Stefani Stoeva (final)
8. (Malaysia) Pearly Tan / Thinaah Muralitharan (first round)

=== Finals ===
Semi-finals
1 | (China) Chen Qingchen (China) Jia Yifan | 21 | 21
6 | (Thailand) Jongkolphan Kititharakul (Thailand) Rawinda Prajongjai | 17 | 12
7 | (Bulgaria) Gabriela Stoeva (Bulgaria) Stefani Stoeva | 16 | 21 | 21
(China) Zhang Shuxian (China) Zheng Yu | 21 | 18 | 9

Final
1 | (China) Chen Qingchen (China) Jia Yifan | 21 | 29 | 21
7 | (Bulgaria) Gabriela Stoeva (Bulgaria) Stefani Stoeva | 16 | 30 | 19

=== Top half ===
==== Section 1 ====
First round
1 | (China) Chen QC (China) Jia YF | 21 | 21
(England) C Birch (England) J Pugh | 15 | 9
(Netherlands) D Jille (Netherlands) C Seinen | 15 | 12
(India) T Jolly (India) G Gopichand | 21 | 21
8 | (Malaysia) P Tan (Malaysia) Thinaah M | 17 | 14
(Scotland) J MacPherson (Scotland) C Torrance | 21 | 21
(Estonia) K-K Marran (Estonia) H Rüütel | 14 | 20
(Malaysia) V Hoo (Malaysia) Lim C S | 21 | 22

Second round
1 | (China) Chen QC (China) Jia YF | 21 | 21
(India) T Jolly (India) G Gopichand | 16 | 12
(Scotland) J MacPherson (Scotland) C Torrance | 14 | 21 | 16
(Malaysia) V Hoo (Malaysia) Lim C S | 21 | 19 | 21

Quarter-finals
1 | (China) Chen QC (China) Jia YF | 21 | 22
(Malaysia) V Hoo (Malaysia) Lim C S | 15 | 20

==== Section 2 ====
First round
PFR | (China) Du Y (China) Li WM | 21 | 21
(Germany) L Efler (Germany) I Lohau | 6 | 9
(Thailand) B Aimsaard (Thailand) N Aimsaard | 21 | 21
(Denmark) M Fruergaard (Denmark) S Thygesen | 15 | 19
6 | (Thailand) J Kititharakul (Thailand) R Prajongjai | w | / | o
(Denmark) A Magelund (Denmark) F Ravn
PFR | (Italy) M Corsini (Italy) J Mair | 21 | 21
(India) H Harinarayanan (India) A Roy | 9 | 10

Second round
PFR | (China) Du Y (China) Li WM | 21 | 21
(Thailand) B Aimsaard (Thailand) N Aimsaard | 16 | 13
6 | (Thailand) J Kititharakul (Thailand) R Prajongjai | 21 | 21
PFR | (Italy) M Corsini (Italy) J Mair | 11 | 12

Quarter-finals
PFR | (China) Du Y (China) Li WM | 24 | 19 | 19
6 | (Thailand) J Kititharakul (Thailand) R Prajongjai | 22 | 21 | 21

=== Bottom half ===
==== Section 3 ====
First round
(France) M Lambert (France) A Tran | 16 | 10
(Japan) R Iwanaga (Japan) K Nakanishi | 21 | 21
(Thailand) S Paewsampran (Thailand) P Supajirakul | 21 | 17 | 12
7 | (Bulgaria) G Stoeva (Bulgaria) S Stoeva | 14 | 21 | 21
PFR | (Denmark) A C Kudsk (Denmark) S Schulz | 15 | 12
(China) Liu XX (China) Xia YT | 21 | 21
(Japan) C Hoshi (Japan) A Matsuda
3 | (South Korea) Kim S-y (South Korea) Kong H-y | w | / | o

Second round
(Japan) R Iwanaga (Japan) K Nakanishi | 9 | 19
7 | (Bulgaria) G Stoeva (Bulgaria) S Stoeva | 21 | 21
(China) Liu XX (China) Xia YT | 9 | 18
3 | (South Korea) Kim S-y (South Korea) Kong H-y | 21 | 21

Quarter-finals
7 | (Bulgaria) G Stoeva (Bulgaria) S Stoeva | 13 | 21 | 21
3 | (South Korea) Kim S-y (South Korea) Kong H-y | 21 | 14 | 15

==== Section 4 ====
First round
PFR | (Germany) Y Li (United States) I Wang | 14 | 10
(South Korea) Jeong N-e (South Korea) Kim H-j | 21 | 21
(India) A Ponnappa (India) N. S Reddy | 13 | 13
5 | (Japan) N Matsuyama (Japan) C Shida | 21 | 21
(China) Zhang SX (China) Zheng Y | 21 | 21
(South Korea) Baek H-n (South Korea) Lee Y-r | 16 | 16
(Spain) C Azurmendi (Spain) B Corrales | 11 | 8
2 | (South Korea) Lee S-h (South Korea) Shin S-c | 21 | 21

Second round
(South Korea) Jeong N-e (South Korea) Kim H-j | 21 | 21
5 | (Japan) N Matsuyama (Japan) C Shida | 18 | 18
(China) Zhang SX (China) Zheng Y | 21 | 15 | 21
2 | (South Korea) Lee S-h (South Korea) Shin S-c | 19 | 21 | 14

Quarter-finals
(South Korea) Jeong N-e (South Korea) Kim H-j | 14 | 12
(China) Zhang SX (China) Zheng Y | 21 | 21

== Mixed doubles ==
=== Seeds ===
1. (Thailand) Dechapol Puavaranukroh / Sapsiree Taerattanachai (champions)
2. (China) Wang Yilyu / Huang Dongping (second round)
3. (Japan) Yuta Watanabe / Arisa Higashino (first round)
4. (Indonesia) Praveen Jordan / Melati Daeva Oktavianti (withdrew)
5. (England) Marcus Ellis / Lauren Smith (semi-finals)
6. (Malaysia) Tan Kian Meng / Lai Pei Jing (quarter-finals)
7. (France) Thom Gicquel / Delphine Delrue (quarter-finals)
8. (Malaysia) Goh Soon Huat / Shevon Jemie Lai (first round)

=== Finals ===
Semi-finals
1 | (Thailand) Dechapol Puavaranukroh (Thailand) Sapsiree Taerattanachai | 21 | 21
(Scotland) Adam Hall (Scotland) Julie MacPherson | 11 | 17
5 | (England) Marcus Ellis (England) Lauren Smith | 18 | 19
(China) Ou Xuanyi (China) Huang Yaqiong | 21 | 21

Final
1 | (Thailand) Dechapol Puavaranukroh (Thailand) Sapsiree Taerattanachai | 21 | 21
(China) Ou Xuanyi (China) Huang Yaqiong | 11 | 9

=== Top half ===
==== Section 1 ====
First round
1 | (Thailand) D Puavaranukroh (Thailand) S Taerattanachai | 21 | 21
(India) K. Sai Pratheek (India) N. S Reddy | 19 | 8
(Germany) J R Jansen (Germany) L Efler | 21 | 21
(China) Zheng SW (China) Zhang SX | 19 | 17
6 | (Malaysia) Tan K M (Malaysia) Lai P J | 15 | 21 | 21
(France) W Villeger (France) A Tran | 21 | 14 | 12
(India) I Bhatnagar (India) T Crasto | 19 | 22 | 9
PFR | (England) G Mairs (England) J Moore | 21 | 20 | 21

Second round
1 | (Thailand) D Puavaranukroh (Thailand) S Taerattanachai | 21 | 21
(Germany) J R Jansen (Germany) L Efler | 10 | 15
6 | (Malaysia) Tan K M (Malaysia) Lai P J | 21 | 10 | 21
PFR | (England) G Mairs (England) J Moore | 16 | 21 | 18

Quarter-finals
1 | (Thailand) D Puavaranukroh (Thailand) S Taerattanachai | 21 | 21
6 | (Malaysia) Tan K M (Malaysia) Lai P J | 11 | 18

==== Section 2 ====
First round
PFR | (India) D Kapila (India) G Gopichand | 19 | 19
(Indonesia) A Maulana (Indonesia) M C Bandaso | 21 | 21
(Denmark) M Mikkelsen (Denmark) R Søby Hansen | 24 | 21
(Germany) M Lamsfuß (Germany) I Lohau | 22 | 13
8 | (Malaysia) Goh S H (Malaysia) S J Lai | 21 | 13 | 12
(England) C Hemming (England) J Pugh | 14 | 21 | 21
(Scotland) A Hall (Scotland) J MacPherson | 21 | 21
(Malaysia) Ong Y S (Malaysia) Goh L Y | 16 | 13

Second round
(Indonesia) A Maulana (Indonesia) M C Bandaso | 21 | 21
(Denmark) M Mikkelsen (Denmark) R Søby Hansen | 13 | 14
(England) C Hemming (England) J Pugh | 17 | 19
(Scotland) A Hall (Scotland) J MacPherson | 21 | 21

Quarter-finals
(Indonesia) A Maulana (Indonesia) M C Bandaso | 17 | 21 | 18
(Scotland) A Hall (Scotland) J MacPherson | 21 | 14 | 21

=== Bottom half ===
==== Section 3 ====
First round
(Thailand) S Jomkoh (Thailand) S Paewsampran | 21 | 21
(Malaysia) Hoo P R (Malaysia) Cheah Y S | 18 | 16
(Malaysia) Chen T J (Malaysia) Peck Y W | 12 | 21 | 21
5 | (England) M Ellis (England) L Smith | 21 | 13 | 23
(Indonesia) R Rivaldy (Indonesia) P H Mentari | 21 | 21
(New Zealand) O Leydon-Davis (New Zealand) A Pak | 10 | 6
(Japan) Y Kaneko (Japan) M Matsutomo | 21 | 21
3 | (Japan) Y Watanabe (Japan) A Higashino | 15 | 19

Second round
(Thailand) S Jomkoh (Thailand) S Paewsampran | 21 | 11 | 13
5 | (England) M Ellis (England) L Smith | 19 | 21 | 21
(Indonesia) R Rivaldy (Indonesia) P H Mentari | 21 | 21
(Japan) Y Kaneko (Japan) M Matsutomo | 9 | 16

Quarter-finals
5 | (England) M Ellis (England) L Smith | 16 | 21 | 21
(Indonesia) R Rivaldy (Indonesia) P H Mentari | 21 | 16 | 19

==== Section 4 ====
First round
(Netherlands) R Tabeling (Netherlands) S Piek | 21 | 21
(Japan) K Yamashita (Japan) N Shinoya | 17 | 15
PFR | (India) Arjun M.R. (India) T Jolly | 9 | 18
7 | (France) T Gicquel (France) D Delrue | 21 | 21
(Denmark) M Christiansen (Denmark) A Bøje | 21 | 16 | 14
(China) Ou XY (China) Huang YQ | 16 | 21 | 21
(Denmark) M Thyrri (Denmark) A Magelund | 14 | 18
2 | (China) Wang YL (China) Huang DP | 21 | 21

Second round
(Netherlands) R Tabeling (Netherlands) S Piek | 21 | 14
7 | (France) T Gicquel (France) D Delrue | 23 | 21
(China) Ou XY (China) Huang YQ | 21 | 21
2 | (China) Wang YL (China) Huang DP | 13 | 18

Quarter-finals
7 | (France) T Gicquel (France) D Delrue | 15 | 21 | 16
(China) Ou XY (China) Huang YQ | 21 | 16 | 21

| Preceded by 2022 Odisha Open | BWF World Tour; 2022 BWF season | Succeeded by 2022 All England Open |
