= 2017 BWF World Junior Championships – Mixed doubles =

2017 BWF World Junior Championships Mixed doubles
Tournament details
- Dates: 16–22 October
- Edition: 19th
- Level: International
- Venue: Among Rogo Sports Hall
- Location: Yogyakarta, Indonesia

The mixed doubles event of the 2017 BWF World Junior Championships was a badminton world junior individual championships for the Eye Level Cups, held on between 16 and 22 October 2017. The defending champions were He Jiting and Du Yue from China.

== Seeds ==
1. (South Korea) Kim Won-ho / Lee Yu-rim (fourth round)
2. (South Korea) Na Sung-seung / Seong Ah-yeong (fourth round)
3. (Indonesia) Rehan Naufal Kusharjanto / Siti Fadia Silva Ramadhanti (final)
4. (Indonesia) Yeremia Rambitan / Angelica Wiratama (quarter-finals)
5. (South Korea) Wang Chan / Kim Min-ji (fourth round)
6. (France) Thom Gicquel / Vimala Hériau (third round)
7. (Thailand) Ruttanapak Oupthong / Chasinee Korepap (fourth round)
8. (Chinese Taipei) Ye Hong-wei / Teng Chun-hsun (second round)

9. (Malaysia) Ng Eng Cheong / Toh Ee Wei (quarter-finals)
10. (Poland) Robert Cybulski / Wiktoria Dabczynska (second round)
11. (Indonesia) Rinov Rivaldy / Pitha Haningtyas Mentari (champions)
12. (Sweden) Carl Harrbacka / Tilda Sjoo (second round)
13. (Malaysia) Chang Yee Jun / Pearly Tan Koong Le (fourth round)
14. (France) Eloi Adam / Juliette Moinard (second round)
15. (India) Dhruv Kapila / Mithula Umakant (second round)
16. (Chinese Taipei) Su Li-wei / Li Zi-qing (second round)

Click on the seed number of a player to go to their draw section.

== Draw ==
=== Finals ===
Quarter-finals
11	(Indonesia) Rinov Rivaldy (Indonesia) Pitha Haningtyas Mentari	13	21	21
(Thailand) Natthapat Trinkajee (Thailand) Kwanchanok Sudjaipraparat	21	17	16
4	(Indonesia) Yeremia Rambitan (Indonesia) Angelica Wiratama	21	13	15
(China) Liu Shiwen (China) Li Wenmei	19	21	21
9	(Malaysia) Ng Eng Cheong (Malaysia) Toh Ee Wei	21	14	15
3	(Indonesia) Rehan Naufal Kusharjanto (Indonesia) Siti Fadia Silva Ramadhanti	18	21	21
(Denmark) Daniel Lundgaard (Denmark) Amalie Magelund	21	8	17
(China) Fan Qiuyue (China) Liu Xuanxuan	17	21	21

Semi-finals
11	(Indonesia) Rinov Rivaldy (Indonesia) Pitha Haningtyas Mentari	18	21	21
(China) Liu Shiwen (China) Li Wenmei	21	16	13
3	(Indonesia) Rehan Naufal Kusharjanto (Indonesia) Siti Fadia Silva Ramadhanti	21	21
(China) Fan Qiuyue (China) Liu Xuanxuan	15	14

Finals
11	(Indonesia) Rinov Rivaldy (Indonesia) Pitha Haningtyas Mentari	21	21	21
3	(Indonesia) Rehan Naufal Kusharjanto (Indonesia) Siti Fadia Silva Ramadhanti	23	15	18

=== Top half ===
==== Section 1 ====
First round
(Hong Kong) Lee C L (Hong Kong) Leung S L	21	22
(Spain) A Martin (Spain) P Lopez	14	20
(Brazil) F Farias (Brazil) J Lima	9	19
(Indonesia) R Samosir (Indonesia) H Julimarbela	21	21
(United States) R Liuzhou (United States) C Yuan	21	21
(India) S Kerhalkar (India) D Choudhary	8	12
(Japan) T Obayashi (Japan) N Saito	21	21
(Netherlands) W van der Aar (Netherlands) A Tirtosentono	16	10
(New Zealand) J Boyle (New Zealand) E Smith	15	17
(Czech Republic) T Švedja (Czech Republic) K Zuzáková	21	21
(Scotland) M Grimley (Scotland) L Middleton	19	21	21
(United States) B Zhu (United States) R Yan	21	12	19

Second round
1	(South Korea) Kim W-h (South Korea) Lee Y-r	21	21
(Hong Kong) Lee C L (Hong Kong) Leung S L	13	14
(Indonesia) R Samosir (Indonesia) H Julimarbela	21	21
(United States) R Liuzhou (United States) C Yuan	12	11
11	(Indonesia) R Rivaldy (Indonesia) P H Mentari	21	18	21
(Japan) T Obayashi (Japan) N Saito	15	21	16
(Czech Republic) T Švedja (Czech Republic) K Zuzáková	18	19
(Scotland) M Grimley (Scotland) L Middleton	21	21

Third round
1	(South Korea) Kim W-h (South Korea) Lee Y-r	21	24
(Indonesia) R Samosir (Indonesia) H Julimarbela	10	22
11	(Indonesia) R Rivaldy (Indonesia) P H Mentari	21	21
(Scotland) M Grimley (Scotland) L Middleton	9	10

Fourth round
1	(South Korea) Kim W-h (South Korea) Lee Y-r	17	17
11	(Indonesia) R Rivaldy (Indonesia) P H Mentari	21	21

==== Section 2 ====
First round
(Thailand) N Trinkajee (Thailand) K Sudjaipraparat	21	21
(Ghana) D Doe (Ghana) J Abitty	5	10
(Philippines) R D Cabalquinto (Philippines) E M Canillo	15	8
(Hungary) G Pytel (Hungary) R Madarasz	21	21
(Georgia (country)) L Ninoshvili (Georgia (country)) M Khachaturyan
(India) S S K Podile (India) R Panda	w	/	o
(Australia) Y X Lin (Australia) V He	21	21
(Egypt) M M Kamel (Egypt) H H Mohamed	14	13
(England) C Hemming (England) H Warner	21	21
(El Salvador) U Canjura (El Salvador) K Lara	8	7
(Denmark) R E F Prasz (Denmark) C Busch	19	22	21
(Philippines) S Padiz Jr. (Philippines) A Geverjuan	21	20	23

Second round
8	(Chinese Taipei) Ye H-w (Chinese Taipei) Teng C-h	14	21	20
(Thailand) N Trinkajee (Thailand) K Sudjaipraparat	21	17	22
(Hungary) G Pytel (Hungary) R Madarasz	16	14
(India) S S K Podile (India) R Panda	21	21
13	(Malaysia) Chang Y J (Malaysia) P Tan	21	21
(Australia) Y X Lin (Australia) V He	13	10
(England) C Hemming (England) H Warner	21	18	23
(Philippines) S Padiz Jr. (Philippines) A Geverjuan	16	21	21

Third round
(Thailand) N Trinkajee (Thailand) K Sudjaipraparat	21	14	21
(India) S S K Podile (India) R Panda	15	21	18
13	(Malaysia) Chang Y J (Malaysia) P Tan	21	21
(England) C Hemming (England) H Warner	18	12

Fourth round
(Thailand) N Trinkajee (Thailand) K Sudjaipraparat	21	26	21
13	(Malaysia) Chang Y J (Malaysia) P Tan	19	28	19

==== Section 3 ====
First round
(Finland) M Lahtinen (Finland) H-L Lindberg	21	22
(Latvia) M Loiko (Latvia) U Berga	12	20
(New Zealand) E Lau (New Zealand) A Tagle	21	21
(Norway) B Norden (Norway) V Ellingsen	10	18
(Singapore) A Tan (Singapore) N I Khan	17	16
(India) A Das Gupta (India) S Jupudi	21	21
(Switzerland) J Scheiwiller (Switzerland) J Stadelmann	21	21
(Denmark) S Grønbjerg (Denmark) F Ravn	18	16
(Pakistan) S Riaz (Pakistan) A Muneeb	15	17
(Norway) M Barth (Norway) E Wåland	21	21
(Nepal) P Maharjan (Nepal) R Maharjan	14	21	21
(South Africa) R Summers (South Africa) M de Beer	21	17	18

Second round
4	(Indonesia) Y Rambitan (Indonesia) A Wiratama	21	21
(Finland) M Lahtinen (Finland) H-L Lindberg	12	12
(New Zealand) E Lau (New Zealand) A Tagle	13	14
(India) A Das Gupta (India) S Jupudi	21	21
14	(France) E Adam (France) J Moinard	13	15
(Switzerland) J Scheiwiller (Switzerland) J Stadelmann	21	21
(Norway) M Barth (Norway) E Wåland	21	21
(Nepal) P Maharjan (Nepal) R Maharjan	13	5

Third round
4	(Indonesia) Y Rambitan (Indonesia) A Wiratama	21	16	21
(India) A Das Gupta (India) S Jupudi	13	21	7
(Switzerland) J Scheiwiller (Switzerland) J Stadelmann	21	21
(Norway) M Barth (Norway) E Wåland	10	14

Fourth round
4	(Indonesia) Y Rambitan (Indonesia) A Wiratama	21	21
11	(Switzerland) J Scheiwiller (Switzerland) J Stadelmann	9	16

==== Section 4 ====
First round
(Germany) T Fischer (Germany) J Petrikowski	21	13	8
(Canada) B Yang (Canada) K Ho-shue	12	21	21
(Belgium) A Lallemand (Belgium) E Pondant	10	11
(Denmark) J Toft (Denmark) A Bøje	21	21
(Russia) G Karpov (Russia) A Shapovalova	21	21
(Nepal) R Maharjan (Nepal) S Mukhiya	6	15
10	(Poland) R Cybulski (Poland) W Dabczynska	21	15	21
(Hong Kong) Mak P N (Hong Kong) Yau M Y	18	21	19
(South Africa) S Noone (South Africa) A Bestbier	10	18
(China) Di ZJ (China) Zhang SX	21	21
(Japan) H Nakayama (Japan) M Yamaguchi	13	17
(China) Liu SW (China) Li WM	21	21
(Macau) Pui P F (Macau) Gong X X	15	17
(Scotland) C Grimley (Scotland) C Torrance	21	21

Second round
5	(South Korea) Wang C (South Korea) Kim M-j	17	25	21
(Canada) B Yang (Canada) K Ho-shue	21	23	15
(Denmark) J Toft (Denmark) A Bøje	21	21
(Russia) G Karpov (Russia) A Shapovalova	16	9
10	(Poland) R Cybulski (Poland) W Dabczynska	10	15
(China) Di ZJ (China) Zhang SX	21	21
(China) Liu SW (China) Li WM	18	21	21
(Scotland) C Grimley (Scotland) C Torrance	21	13	16

Third round
5	(South Korea) Wang C (South Korea) Kim M-j	14	24	21
(Denmark) J Toft (Denmark) A Bøje	21	22	10
(China) Di ZJ (China) Zhang SX	21	19	18
(China) Liu SW (China) Li WM	19	21	21

Fourth round
5	(South Korea) Wang C (South Korea) Kim M-j	19	15
(China) Liu SW (China) Li WM	21	21

=== Bottom half ===
==== Section 5 ====
First round
(China) Feng YZ (China) Chen YX	21	21
(Latvia) A Kelpe (Latvia) L Lencevica	8	7
(Philippines) J R Villarante (Philippines) T M Opon	21	21
(South Africa) J Elliot (South Africa) J Scholtz	12	11
(Brazil) W V E Santos (Brazil) J Viana	21	21
(Georgia (country)) P Piltoyan (Georgia (country)) L Lanchava	6	7
(Germany) H Graalmann (Germany) S S Küspert	22	15	14
9	(Malaysia) Ng E C (Malaysia) Toh E W	20	21	21
(El Salvador) C Henrriquez (El Salvador) C Navas	7	7
(Australia) M Kong (Australia) M Chan	21	21
(Canada) N Nguyen (Canada) A Mocanu	20	17
(Russia) V Kokhanov (Russia) E Filippova	22	21
(Scotland) C Pringle (Scotland) R Sugden	21	19	21
(Czech Republic) J Janoštík (Czech Republic) L Krpatová	16	21	14

Second round
(China) Feng YZ (China) Chen YX	21	21
(Philippines) J R Villarante (Philippines) T M Opon	10	11
(Brazil) W V E Santos (Brazil) J Viana	11	11
9	(Malaysia) Ng E C (Malaysia) Toh E W	21	21
(Australia) M Kong (Australia) M Chan	10	13
(Russia) V Kokhanov (Russia) E Filippova	21	21
(Scotland) C Pringle (Scotland) R Sugden	17	12
7	(Thailand) R Oupthong (Thailand) C Korepap	21	21

Third round
(China) Feng YZ (China) Chen YX	12	9
9	(Malaysia) Ng E C (Malaysia) Toh E W	21	21
(Russia) V Kokhanov (Russia) E Filippova	13	17
7	(Thailand) R Oupthong (Thailand) C Korepap	21	21

Fourth round
9	(Malaysia) Ng E C (Malaysia) Toh E W	21	21
7	(Thailand) R Oupthong (Thailand) C Korepap	17	18

==== Section 6 ====
First round
(New Zealand) J Seto (New Zealand) J Yu	14	21
(Sri Lanka) R Sasindu (Sri Lanka) D Dias	21	23
(Singapore) Toh H Z (Singapore) C Wong	21	21
(Nepal) P Kumar Lingthen (Nepal) J Gurung	9	4
(Bulgaria) I Stoynov (Bulgaria) H Popovska	16	18
(Chinese Taipei) Lu C (Chinese Taipei) Lin J-y	21	21
(Egypt) B T Abdelrahim (Egypt) J Ashraf	7	9
(Poland) K Ploch (Poland) A Goszczynska	21	21
(Finland) J Honkanen (Finland) P Lindberg	14	16
(Belgium) J van Nieuwkerke (Belgium) J de Langhe	21	21
(England) H Huang (England) P Reyes	21	21
(Ghana) E Andrews (Ghana) E Yaa Migbodzi	9	10

Second round
(Sri Lanka) R Sasindu (Sri Lanka) D Dias	19	16
(Singapore) Toh H Z (Singapore) C Wong	21	21
(Chinese Taipei) Lu C (Chinese Taipei) Lin J-y	21	21
16	(Chinese Taipei) Su L-w (Chinese Taipei) Li Z-q	16	15
(Poland) K Ploch (Poland) A Goszczynska	21	23
(Belgium) J van Nieuwkerke (Belgium) J de Langhe	18	21
(England) H Huang (England) P Reyes	8	16
3	(Indonesia) R N Kusharjanto (Indonesia) S F S Ramadhanti	21	21

Third round
(Singapore) Toh H Z (Singapore) C Wong	21	19	17
(Chinese Taipei) Lu C (Chinese Taipei) Lin J-y	14	21	21
(Poland) K Ploch (Poland) A Goszczynska	10	9
3	(Indonesia) R N Kusharjanto (Indonesia) S F S Ramadhanti	21	21

Fourth round
(Chinese Taipei) Lu C (Chinese Taipei) Lin J-y	16	21
3	(Indonesia) R N Kusharjanto (Indonesia) S F S Ramadhanti	21	23

==== Section 7 ====
First round
(Russia) M Lavrikov (Russia) A Pustinskaia	22	19	16
(Germany) L Resch (Germany) Moszczynski	20	21	21
(Thailand) W Sothon (Thailand) S Paewsampran	22	11	19
(Denmark) D Lundgaard (Denmark) A Magelund	20	21	21
(Malaysia) Chia W J (Malaysia) Ng W W	14	22	21
(Japan) N Yamada (Japan) R Iwanaga	21	20	16
(Vietnam) Nguyen H D (Vietnam) Vu T A T	21	21
12	(Sweden) C Harrbacka (Sweden) T Sjoo	23	23
(Norway) O H Imset (Norway) M Christensen	15	13
(Netherlands) G Duijs (Netherlands) M Linders	21	21
(Turkey) E Sonmez (Turkey) I N Ozelgul	15	9
(Malaysia) Man W C (Malaysia) Tan S J	21	21
(Poland) T Malik (Poland) I Pajek	12	15
(England) R Easton (England) A Lado	21	21

Second round
(Germany) L Resch (Germany) Moszczynski	17	21	14
(Denmark) D Lundgaard (Denmark) A Magelund	21	14	21
(Malaysia) Chia W J (Malaysia) Ng W W	21	21
12	(Sweden) C Harrbacka (Sweden) T Sjoo	15	17
(Netherlands) G Duijs (Netherlands) M Linders	9	16
(Malaysia) Man W C (Malaysia) Tan S J	21	21
(England) R Easton (England) A Lado	15	14
6	(France) T Gicquel (France) V Hériau	21	21

Third round
(Denmark) D Lundgaard (Denmark) A Magelund	21	21
(Malaysia) Chia W J (Malaysia) Ng W W	17	11
(Malaysia) Man W C (Malaysia) Tan S J	21	24
6	(France) T Gicquel (France) V Hériau	15	22

Fourth round
(Denmark) D Lundgaard (Denmark) A Magelund	19	24	21
(Malaysia) Man W C (Malaysia) Tan S J	21	22	13

==== Section 8 ====
First round
(Hong Kong) Lui C W (Hong Kong) Yeung P L	21	21
(Spain) J Molares (Spain) L Santos	14	9
(Slovakia) A Horak (Slovakia) M Tarcalova	14	4
(Japan) K Chikugo (Japan) N Yura	21	21
(China) Fan QY (China) Liu XX	21	21
(Australia) P Yan (Australia) L Lim	9	7
(Canada) K To (Canada) C Lai	13	24
(Singapore) R Loh (Singapore) B Lim	21	26
(Hungary) Z Dulcz (Hungary) K Szotak	21	21
(Brunei) J S Lee (Brunei) S Lee	12	11
(Chinese Taipei) Lin Y-c (Chinese Taipei) Liang C-w	21	21
(United States) Y Wu (United States) B Chi	19	14

Second round
(Hong Kong) Lui C W (Hong Kong) Yeung P L	21	15	21
(Japan) K Chikugo (Japan) N Yura	18	21	11
(China) Fan QY (China) Liu XX	21	21
15	(India) D Kapila (India) M Umakant	18	16
(Singapore) R Loh (Singapore) B Lim	21	21
(Hungary) Z Dulcz (Hungary) K Szotak	17	16
(Chinese Taipei) Lin Y-c (Chinese Taipei) Liang C-w	14	18
2	(South Korea) Na S-s (South Korea) Seong A-y	21	21

Third round
(Hong Kong) Lui C W (Hong Kong) Yeung P L	8	14
(China) Fan QY (China) Liu XX	21	21
(Singapore) R Loh (Singapore) B Lim	10	5
2	(South Korea) Na S-s (South Korea) Seong A-y	21	21

Fourth round
(China) Fan QY (China) Liu XX	21	21
2	(South Korea) Na S-s (South Korea) Seong A-y	19	17
