= 2020 Malaysia Masters =

Badminton tournament in Kuala Lumpur

Tournament details
- Dates: 7–12 January 2020
- Level: Super 500
- Total prize money: US$400,000
- Venue: Axiata Arena
- Location: Kuala Lumpur, Malaysia

Champions
- Men's singles: (Japan) Kento Momota
- Women's singles: (China) Chen Yufei
- Men's doubles: (South Korea) Kim Gi-jung (South Korea) Lee Yong-dae
- Women's doubles: (China) Li Wenmei (China) Zheng Yu
- Mixed doubles: (China) Zheng Siwei (China) Huang Yaqiong

The 2020 Malaysia Masters (officially known as the Perodua Malaysia Masters 2020 for sponsorship reasons) was a badminton tournament that took place at the Axiata Arena in Malaysia from 7 to 12 January 2020 and had a total purse of $400,000.

== Tournament ==
The 2020 Malaysia Masters was the first tournament of the 2020 BWF World Tour and also part of the Malaysia Masters championships, which had been held since 2009. This tournament was organized by the Badminton Association of Malaysia and sanctioned by the BWF.

=== Venue ===
This international tournament was held at the Axiata Arena in Kuala Lumpur, Malaysia.

=== Point distribution ===
Below is the point distribution for each phase of the tournament based on the BWF points system for the BWF World Tour Super 500 event.

Winner	Runner-up	3/4	5/8	9/16	17/32	33/64	65/128
9,200	7,800	6,420	5,040	3,600	2,220	880	430

=== Prize money ===
The total prize money for this tournament was US$400,000. Distribution of prize money was in accordance with BWF regulations.

Event	Winner	Finals	Semi-finals	Quarter-finals	Last 16
Singles	$30,000	$15,200	$5,800	$2,400	$1,400
Doubles	$31,600	$15,200	$5,600	$2,900	$1,500

== Men's singles ==
=== Seeds ===
1. (Japan) Kento Momota (champion)
2. (Chinese Taipei) Chou Tien-chen (second round)
3. (Denmark) Anders Antonsen (first round)
4. (China) Chen Long (quarter-finals)
5. (Denmark) Viktor Axelsen (final)
6. (Indonesia) Jonatan Christie (quarter-finals)
7. (China) Shi Yuqi (quarter-finals)
8. (Indonesia) Anthony Sinisuka Ginting (first round)

=== Finals ===
Semi-finals
1	(Japan) Kento Momota	21	21
(Malaysia) Lee Zii Jia	10	19
5	(Denmark) Viktor Axelsen	21	21
(Hong Kong) Ng Ka Long	14	18

Final
1	(Japan) Kento Momota	24	21
5	(Denmark) Viktor Axelsen	22	11

=== Top half ===
==== Section 1 ====
First Round
1	(Japan) K Momota	21	21
(India) Parupalli K	17	16
(Japan) K Tsuneyama	9	17
(India) Prannoy K	21	21
8	(Indonesia) A S Ginting	16	20
PFQ	(China) Huang YX	21	22
(China) Lin D	19	18
(Denmark) J Ø. Jørgensen	21	21

Second Round
1	(Japan) K Momota	21	21
(India) Prannoy K	14	16
PFQ	(China) Huang YX	14	21	21
(Denmark) J Ø. Jørgensen	21	19	18

Quarter-finals
1	(Japan) K Momota	21	19	21
PFQ	(China) Huang YX	13	21	9

==== Section 2 ====
First Round
3	(Denmark) A Antonsen	21	15	8
(Malaysia) Lee Z J	14	21	21
(India) Sa Verma	21	21
(Thailand) K Wangcharoen	16	15
7	(China) Shi YQ	21	22
(Chinese Taipei) Wang T-w	12	20
Q3	(Denmark) H-K Vittinghus	11	21	16
(China) Lu GZ	21	18	21

Second Round
(Malaysia) Lee Z J	21	22
(India) Sa Verma	19	20
7	(China) Shi YQ	21	21
(China) Lu GZ	16	12

Quarter-finals
(Malaysia) Lee Z J	12	21	21
7	(China) Shi YQ	21	16	19

=== Bottom half ===
==== Section 3 ====
First Round
(Japan) K Nishimoto	23	21
Q4	(China) Sun FX	21	10
(Indonesia) T Sugiarto	13	8
5	(Denmark) V Axelsen	21	21
(Hong Kong) Lee C Y	21	21
(Indonesia) S H Rhustavito	18	16
(South Korea) Son W-h	16	14
4	(China) Chen L	21	21

Second Round
(Japan) K Nishimoto	6	17
5	(Denmark) V Axelsen	21	21
(Hong Kong) Lee C Y	18	13
4	(China) Chen L	21	21

Quarter-finals
5	(Denmark) V Axelsen	21	12	22
4	(China) Chen L	11	21	20

==== Section 4 ====
First Round
(Denmark) R Gemke	21	21
(India) B. Sai Praneeth	11	15
Q2	(Malaysia) Liew D	10	21	15
6	(Indonesia) J Christie	21	16	21
Q1	(Japan) K Watanabe	21	20	7
(Hong Kong) Ng K L	17	22	21
(India) S Kidambi	17	5
2	(Chinese Taipei) Chou T-c	21	21

Second Round
(Denmark) R Gemke	20	13
6	(Indonesia) J Christie	22	21
(Hong Kong) Ng K L	23	21
2	(Chinese Taipei) Chou T-c	21	17

Quarter-finals
6	(Indonesia) J Christie	21	12	18
(Hong Kong) Ng K L	15	21	21

== Women's singles ==
=== Seeds ===
1. (Chinese Taipei) Tai Tzu-ying (final)
2. (China) Chen Yufei (champion)
3. (Japan) Nozomi Okuhara (quarter-finals)
4. (Japan) Akane Yamaguchi (first round)
5. (Thailand) Ratchanok Intanon (second round)
6. (India) P. V. Sindhu (quarter-finals)
7. (China) He Bingjiao (semi-finals)
8. (South Korea) An Se-young (second round)

=== Finals ===
Semi-finals
1	(Chinese Taipei) Tai Tzu-ying	21	21
7	(China) He Bingjiao	17	12
(Spain) Carolina Marín	15	14
2	(China) Chen Yufei	21	21

Final
1	(Chinese Taipei) Tai Tzu-ying	17	10
2	(China) Chen Yufei	21	21

=== Top half ===
==== Section 1 ====
First Round
1	(Chinese Taipei) Tai T-y	21	21
PFQ	(China) Zhang YM	14	10
(Thailand) P Chochuwong	16	15
(South Korea) Sung J-h	21	21
6	(India) P. V. Sindhu	21	21
(Russia) E Kosetskaya	15	13
(Japan) A Ohori	21	14	21
(Thailand) B Ongbamrungphan	9	21	15

Second Round
1	(Chinese Taipei) Tai T-y	21	16	21
(South Korea) Sung J-h	18	21	10
6	(India) P. V. Sindhu	21	21
(Japan) A Ohori	10	15

Quarter-finals
1	(Chinese Taipei) Tai T-y	21	21
6	(India) P. V. Sindhu	16	16

==== Section 2 ====
First Round
3	(Japan) N Okuhara	21	21	21
Q4	(Hong Kong) Yip P Y	16	23	13
(Japan) S Takahashi	21	20	21
(United States) B Zhang	12	22	15
7	(China) He BJ	13	21	21
(South Korea) Kim G-e	21	11	14
Q2	(Indonesia) R Hartawan	10	21	21
(Singapore) Yeo J M	21	11	16

Second Round
3	(Japan) N Okuhara	21	21
(Japan) S Takahashi	14	9
7	(China) He BJ	21	21
Q2	(Indonesia) R Hartawan	13	17

Quarter-finals
3	(Japan) N Okuhara	17	10
7	(China) He BJ	21	21

=== Bottom half ===
==== Section 3 ====
First Round
(India) S Nehwal	21	21
Q3	(Belgium) L Tan	15	17
PFQ	(Thailand) P Buranaprasertsuk	12	9
8	(South Korea) An S-y	21	21
(China) Cai YY	21	21
(Indonesia) Fitriani	10	12
(Spain) C Marín	21	24
4	(Japan) A Yamaguchi	4	22

Second Round
(India) S Nehwal	25	21
8	(South Korea) An S-y	23	12
(China) Cai YY	16	18
(Spain) C Marín	21	21

Quarter-finals
(India) S Nehwal	8	7
(Spain) C Marín	21	21

==== Section 4 ====
First Round
Q1	(France) Qi XF	21	11	11
(China) Wang ZY	12	21	21
(Indonesia) G M Tunjung	24	19	15
5	(Thailand) R Intanon	22	21	21
(Thailand) N Jindapol	21	22
(China) Han Y	17	20
(Denmark) L Kjærsfeldt	12	22	12
2	(China) Chen YF	21	20	21

Second Round
(China) Wang ZY	19	21	22
5	(Thailand) R Intanon	21	11	20
(Thailand) N Jindapol	12	13
2	(China) Chen YF	21	21

Quarter-finals
(China) Wang ZY	19	14
2	(China) Chen YF	21	21

== Men's doubles ==
=== Seeds ===
1. (Indonesia) Marcus Fernaldi Gideon / Kevin Sanjaya Sukamuljo (quarter-finals)
2. (Indonesia) Mohammad Ahsan / Hendra Setiawan (semi-finals)
3. (China) Li Junhui / Liu Yuchen (final)
4. (Japan) Takeshi Kamura / Keigo Sonoda (second round)
5. (Indonesia) Fajar Alfian / Muhammad Rian Ardianto (semi-finals)
6. (Japan) Hiroyuki Endo / Yuta Watanabe (withdrew)
7. (Chinese Taipei) Lee Yang / Wang Chi-lin (quarter-finals)
8. (China) Han Chengkai / Zhou Haodong (second round)

=== Finals ===
Semi-finals
5	(Indonesia) Fajar Alfian (Indonesia) Muhammad Rian Ardianto	21	19	15
PFQ	(South Korea) Kim Gi-jung (South Korea) Lee Yong-dae	14	21	21
3	(China) Li Junhui (China) Liu Yuchen	22	19	24
2	(Indonesia) Mohammad Ahsan (Indonesia) Hendra Setiawan	20	21	22

Final
PFQ	(South Korea) Kim Gi-jung (South Korea) Lee Yong-dae	21	21
3	(China) Li Junhui (China) Liu Yuchen	14	16

=== Top half ===
==== Section 1 ====
First Round
1	(Indonesia) M F Gideon (Indonesia) K S Sukamuljo	21	21
Q2	(Chinese Taipei) Lin C-y (Chinese Taipei) Yang M-t	17	8
(Malaysia) Goh V S (Malaysia) Tan W K	19	18
(Malaysia) A Chia (Malaysia) Soh W Y	21	21
5	(Indonesia) F Alfian (Indonesia) M R Ardianto	21	21
(Denmark) M Boe (Denmark) M Conrad-Petersen	17	14
(China) He JT (China) Tan Q	21	18	15
(South Korea) Choi S-g (South Korea) Seo S-j	17	21	21

Second Round
1	(Indonesia) M F Gideon (Indonesia) K S Sukamuljo	21	21
(Malaysia) A Chia (Malaysia) Soh W Y	15	11
5	(Indonesia) F Alfian (Indonesia) M R Ardianto	21	21
(South Korea) Choi S-g (South Korea) Seo S-j	16	14

Quarter-finals
1	(Indonesia) M F Gideon (Indonesia) K S Sukamuljo	19	21	21
5	(Indonesia) F Alfian (Indonesia) M R Ardianto	21	17	23

==== Section 2 ====
First Round
4	(Japan) T Kamura (Japan) K Sonoda	21	21
(Indonesia) W Nayaka (Indonesia) A Yusuf	10	19
(Chinese Taipei) Lu C-y (Chinese Taipei) Yang P-ha	18	17
PFQ	(South Korea) Kim G-j (South Korea) Lee Y-d	21	21
8	(China) Han CK (China) Zhou HD	15	22	21
Q3	(Germany) J R Jansen (Germany) P Käsbauer	21	20	14
(India) S Rankireddy (India) C Shetty	15	21	15
(Malaysia) Ong Y S (Malaysia) Teo E Y	21	18	21

Second Round
4	(Japan) T Kamura (Japan) K Sonoda	15	17
PFQ	(South Korea) Kim G-j (South Korea) Lee Y-d	21	21
8	(China) Han CK (China) Zhou HD	13	18
(Malaysia) Ong Y S (Malaysia) Teo E Y	21	21

Quarter-finals
PFQ	(South Korea) Kim G-j (South Korea) Lee Y-d	19	21	22
(Malaysia) Ong Y S (Malaysia) Teo E Y	21	15	20

=== Bottom half ===
==== Section 3 ====
First Round
(China) Huang KX (China) Liu C	22	10	21
(Denmark) K Astrup (Denmark) A S Rasmussen	20	21	10
(South Korea) Ko S-h (South Korea) Shin B-c	13	12
PFQ	(Japan) A Koga (Japan) T Saito	21	21
(Chinese Taipei) Lee J-h (Chinese Taipei) Yang P-hs	21	19	21
Q1	(China) Di ZJ (China) Wang C	17	21	16
PFQ	(Netherlands) J Maas (Netherlands) R Tabeling	11	12
3	(China) Li JH (China) Liu YC	21	21

Second Round
(China) Huang KX (China) Liu C	10	21	21
PFQ	(Japan) A Koga (Japan) T Saito	21	16	23
(Chinese Taipei) Lee J-h (Chinese Taipei) Yang P-hs	21	17	13
3	(China) Li JH (China) Liu YC	18	21	21

Quarter-finals
PFQ	(Japan) A Koga (Japan) T Saito	12	15
3	(China) Li JH (China) Liu YC	21	21

==== Section 4 ====
First Round
Q4	(South Korea) Kim D-y (South Korea) Kim S-r	21	21
(Malaysia) Goh S F (Malaysia) N Izzuddin	15	17
(Russia) V Ivanov (Russia) I Sozonov	13	17
7	(Chinese Taipei) Lee Y (Chinese Taipei) Wang C-l	21	21
(England) B Lane (England) S Vendy	16	18
(Chinese Taipei) Liao M-c (Chinese Taipei) Su C-h	21	21
(China) Ou XY (China) Zhang N	19	22
2	(Indonesia) M Ahsan (Indonesia) H Setiawan	21	24

Second Round
Q4	(South Korea) Kim D-y (South Korea) Kim S-r	21	18	9
7	(Chinese Taipei) Lee Y (Chinese Taipei) Wang C-l	19	21	21
(Chinese Taipei) Liao M-c (Chinese Taipei) Su C-h	11	15
2	(Indonesia) M Ahsan (Indonesia) H Setiawan	21	21

Quarter-finals
7	(Chinese Taipei) Lee Y (Chinese Taipei) Wang C-l	22	18	19
2	(Indonesia) M Ahsan (Indonesia) H Setiawan	20	21	21

== Women's doubles ==
=== Seeds ===
1. (China) Chen Qingchen / Jia Yifan (second round)
2. (Japan) Yuki Fukushima / Sayaka Hirota (second round)
3. (Japan) Mayu Matsumoto / Wakana Nagahara (withdrew)
4. (Japan) Misaki Matsutomo / Ayaka Takahashi (quarter-finals)
5. (South Korea) Lee So-hee / Shin Seung-chan (quarter-finals)
6. (South Korea) Kim So-yeong / Kong Hee-yong (quarter-finals)
7. (China) Du Yue / Li Yinhui (final)
8. (Indonesia) Greysia Polii / Apriyani Rahayu (semi-finals)

=== Finals ===
Semi-finals
(Japan) Nami Matsuyama (Japan) Chiharu Shida	14	21	11
7	(China) Du Yue (China) Li Yinhui	21	19	21
8	(Indonesia) Greysia Polii (Indonesia) Apriyani Rahayu	19	21	19
(China) Li Wenmei (China) Zheng Yu	21	18	21

Final
7	(China) Du Yue (China) Li Yinhui	19	21	19
(China) Li Wenmei (China) Zheng Yu	21	16	21

=== Top half ===
==== Section 1 ====
First Round
1	(China) Chen QC (China) Jia YF	21	21
(China) Dong WJ (China) Feng XY	17	19
Q1	(Malaysia) Teoh M X (Malaysia) Yap L	19	14
(Japan) N Matsuyama (Japan) C Shida	21	21
5	(South Korea) Lee S-h (South Korea) Shin S-c	21	21
(Denmark) M Fruergaard (Denmark) S Thygesen	19	10
(France) D Delrue (France) L Palermo	6	15
(Netherlands) S Piek (Netherlands) C Seinen	21	21

Second Round
1	(China) Chen QC (China) Jia YF	15	12
(Japan) N Matsuyama (Japan) C Shida	21	21
5	(South Korea) Lee S-h (South Korea) Shin S-c	21	21
(Netherlands) S Piek (Netherlands) C Seinen	15	19

Quarter-finals
(Japan) N Matsuyama (Japan) C Shida	16	21	21
5	(South Korea) Lee S-h (South Korea) Shin S-c	21	15	17

==== Section 2 ====
First Round
4	(Japan) M Matsutomo (Japan) A Takahashi	21	21
(Thailand) J Kititharakul (Thailand) R Prajongjai	10	17
(Germany) L Efler (Germany) I Herttrich	14	21	19
(Russia) E Bolotova (Russia) A Davletova	21	16	21
7	(China) Du Y (China) Li YH	21	21
(Malaysia) Chou M K (Malaysia) Lee M Y	13	18
(Thailand) P Supajirakul (Thailand) S Taerattanachai	21	21
(Australia) S Mapasa (Australia) G Somerville	13	16

Second Round
4	(Japan) M Matsutomo (Japan) A Takahashi	21	21
(Russia) E Bolotova (Russia) A Davletova	17	9
7	(China) Du Y (China) Li YH	21	21
(Thailand) P Supajirakul (Thailand) S Taerattanachai	18	14

Quarter-finals
4	(Japan) M Matsutomo (Japan) A Takahashi	21	19	20
7	(China) Du Y (China) Li YH	17	21	22

=== Bottom half ===
==== Section 3 ====
First Round
Q4	(Malaysia) P Tan K L (Malaysia) M Thinaah	21	21
Q3	(Malaysia) A Cheong C Y (Malaysia) Lim C S	15	10
(South Korea) Baek H-n (South Korea) Jung K-e	17	22	21
8	(Indonesia) G Polii (Indonesia) A Rahayu	21	20	23
(South Korea) Chang Y-n (South Korea) Kim H-r	21	21
PFQ	(Chinese Taipei) Cheng C-y (Chinese Taipei) Lee C-c	18	18
(Chinese Taipei) Hsu Y-c (Chinese Taipei) Hu L-f	15	21	21
PFQ	(Denmark) A Bøje (Denmark) M Poulsen	21	14	19

Second Round
Q4	(Malaysia) P Tan K L (Malaysia) M Thinaah	20	15
8	(Indonesia) G Polii (Indonesia) A Rahayu	22	21
(South Korea) Chang Y-n (South Korea) Kim H-r	21	21
(Chinese Taipei) Hsu Y-c (Chinese Taipei) Hu L-f	17	14

Quarter-finals
8	(Indonesia) G Polii (Indonesia) A Rahayu	21	21
(South Korea) Chang Y-n (South Korea) Kim H-r	19	19

==== Section 4 ====
First Round
(China) Liu XX (China) Xia YT	21	21
(Malaysia) V Hoo K M (Malaysia) Yap C W	16	10
(Chinese Taipei) Chang C-h (Chinese Taipei) Yang C-t	9	15
6	(South Korea) Kim S-y (South Korea) Kong H-y	21	21
(China) Li WM (China) Zheng Y	14	21	21
Q2	(Indonesia) S F S Ramadhanti (Indonesia) R Sugiarto	21	10	9
(Canada) R Honderich (Canada) K Tsai	10	9
2	(Japan) Y Fukushima (Japan) S Hirota	21	21

Second Round
(China) Liu XX (China) Xia YT	17	21	15
6	(South Korea) Kim S-y (South Korea) Kong H-y	21	19	21
(China) Li WM (China) Zheng Y	18	24	21
2	(Japan) Y Fukushima (Japan) S Hirota	21	22	17

Quarter-finals
6	(South Korea) Kim S-y (South Korea) Kong H-y	16	12
(China) Li WM (China) Zheng Y	21	21

== Mixed doubles ==
=== Seeds ===
1. (China) Zheng Siwei / Huang Yaqiong (champions)
2. (China) Wang Yilyu / Huang Dongping (final)
3. (Japan) Yuta Watanabe / Arisa Higashino (withdrew)
4. (Thailand) Dechapol Puavaranukroh / Sapsiree Taerattanachai (second round)
5. (Indonesia) Praveen Jordan / Melati Daeva Oktavianti (first round)
6. (Malaysia) Chan Peng Soon / Goh Liu Ying (semi-finals)
7. (South Korea) Seo Seung-jae / Chae Yoo-jung (first round)
8. (Malaysia) Goh Soon Huat / Shevon Jemie Lai (quarter-finals)

=== Finals ===
Semi-finals
1	(China) Zheng Siwei (China) Huang Yaqiong	21	21
(Indonesia) Hafiz Faizal (Indonesia) Gloria Emanuelle Widjaja	13	12
6	(Malaysia) Chan Peng Soon (Malaysia) Goh Liu Ying	10	13
2	(China) Wang Yilyu (China) Huang Dongping	21	21

Final
1	(China) Zheng Siwei (China) Huang Yaqiong	21	21
2	(China) Wang Yilyu (China) Huang Dongping	19	12

=== Top half ===
==== Section 1 ====
First Round
1	(China) Zheng SW (China) Huang YQ	21	21
(India) P Chopra (India) N. S Reddy	10	10
(Canada) J Hurlburt-Yu (Canada) J Wu	10	14
(Hong Kong) Tang C M (Hong Kong) Tse Y S	21	21
8	(Malaysia) Goh S H (Malaysia) S J Lai	21	21
(China) He JT (China) Du Y	12	19
(Hong Kong) Chang T C (Hong Kong) Ng W Y	16	21	17
(France) T Gicquel (France) D Delrue	21	19	21

Second Round
1	(China) Zheng SW (China) Huang YQ	21	21
(Hong Kong) Tang C M (Hong Kong) Tse Y S	12	9
8	(Malaysia) Goh S H (Malaysia) S J Lai	21	21
(France) T Gicquel (France) D Delrue	16	14

Quarter-finals
1	(China) Zheng SW (China) Huang YQ	21	21
8	(Malaysia) Goh S H (Malaysia) S J Lai	11	9

==== Section 2 ====
First Round
PFQ	(Chinese Taipei) Lee Y (Chinese Taipei) Yang C-t	21	16	21
(Indonesia) R Rivaldy (Indonesia) P H Mentari	18	21	18
Q2	(South Korea) Ko S-h (South Korea) Eom H-w	20	21	21
(England) C Adcock (England) G Adcock	22	19	12
5	(Indonesia) P Jordan (Indonesia) M D Oktavianti	18	13
Q4	(Malaysia) Man W C (Malaysia) P Tan K L	21	21
(Germany) M Lamsfuß (Germany) I Herttrich	16	19
(Indonesia) H Faizal (Indonesia) G E Widjaja	21	21

Second Round
PFQ	(Chinese Taipei) Lee Y (Chinese Taipei) Yang C-t	21	13	21
Q2	(South Korea) Ko S-h (South Korea) Eom H-w	19	21	18
Q4	(Malaysia) Man W C (Malaysia) P Tan K L	12	14
(Indonesia) H Faizal (Indonesia) G E Widjaja	21	21

Quarter-finals
PFQ	(Chinese Taipei) Lee Y (Chinese Taipei) Yang C-t	19	20
(Indonesia) H Faizal (Indonesia) G E Widjaja	21	22

=== Bottom half ===
==== Section 3 ====
First Round
Q3	(South Korea) Choi S-g (South Korea) Shin S-c	23	21	21
(Chinese Taipei) Wang C-l (Chinese Taipei) Cheng C-y	25	10	12
Q1	(Malaysia) Low H Y (Malaysia) Lim C S	7	11
6	(Malaysia) Chan P S (Malaysia) Goh L Y	21	21
(Japan) T Hoki (Japan) W Nagahara	21	21
(Republic of Ireland) S Magee (Republic of Ireland) C Magee	12	14
(Chinese Taipei) Lee J-h (Chinese Taipei) Hsu Y-c	13	20
4	(Thailand) D Puavaranukroh (Thailand) S Taerattanachai	21	22

Second Round
Q3	(South Korea) Choi S-g (South Korea) Shin S-c	13	13
6	(Malaysia) Chan P S (Malaysia) Goh L Y	21	21
(Japan) T Hoki (Japan) W Nagahara	21	23
4	(Thailand) D Puavaranukroh (Thailand) S Taerattanachai	17	21

Quarter-finals
6	(Malaysia) Chan P S (Malaysia) Goh L Y	21	21
(Japan) T Hoki (Japan) W Nagahara	15	18

==== Section 4 ====
First Round
(Russia) R Alimov (Russia) A Davletova	18	16
(Netherlands) R Tabeling (Netherlands) S Piek	21	21
(Denmark) M Christiansen (Denmark) A Bøje	2
7	(South Korea) Seo S-j (South Korea) Chae Y-j	3^{r}
(Indonesia) R K Suwardi (Indonesia) P Z Bernadeth	21	21
(Malaysia) Tan K M (Malaysia) Lai P J	17	4
PFQ	(Malaysia) Hoo P R (Malaysia) Cheah Y S	13	10
2	(China) Wang YL (China) Huang DP	21	21

Second Round
(Netherlands) R Tabeling (Netherlands) S Piek	21	11	21
(Denmark) M Christiansen (Denmark) A Bøje	18	21	10
(Indonesia) R K Suwardi (Indonesia) P Z Bernadeth	13	23
2	(China) Wang YL (China) Huang DP	21	25

Quarter-finals
(Netherlands) R Tabeling (Netherlands) S Piek	21	8	15
2	(China) Wang YL (China) Huang DP	19	21	21

Preceded by 2019 BWF World Tour Finals	BWF World Tour; 2020 BWF season	Succeeded by 2020 Indonesia Masters
