= Pitha Haningtyas Mentari =

Indonesian badminton player (born 1999)

Personal information
- Born: 1 July 1999 (age 27) Jakarta, Indonesia
- Height: 1.57 m (5 ft 2 in)

Sport
- Country: Indonesia
- Sport: Badminton
- Handedness: Right

Women's & mixed doubles
- Highest ranking: 130 (WD with Rosyita Eka Putri Sari, 9 July 2019); 9 (XD with Rinov Rivaldy, 27 December 2022)
- BWF profile
Medal record
Women's badminton
Representing Indonesia
Sudirman Cup
Bronze medal – third place	2025 Xiamen	Mixed team
SEA Games
Silver medal – second place	2019 Philippines	Women's team
Silver medal – second place	2021 Vietnam	Women's team
Bronze medal – third place	2019 Philippines	Mixed doubles
Bronze medal – third place	2021 Vietnam	Mixed doubles
World Junior Championships
Gold medal – first place	2017 Yogyakarta	Mixed doubles

Pitha Haningtyas Mentari (born 1 July 1999) is an Indonesian badminton player affiliated with Jaya Raya Jakarta badminton club. She won the gold medal at the 2017 World Junior Championships, and bronze medals at the 2019 and 2021 SEA Games in the mixed doubles with Rinov Rivaldy. Mentari was also a member of the Indonesian women's team that won the silver medal in 2019 and 2021 SEA Games.

== Career ==
In September–October 2021, Mentari alongside the Indonesian team competed at the 2021 Sudirman Cup in Vantaa, Finland. She won a match in the group stage against B. R. Sankeerth and Crystal Lai of Canada. Indonesia advanced to the knockout stage but lost at the quarter-finals against Malaysia.

=== 2023 ===
In January, Mentari and her partner Rinov Rivaldy started the season with unsatisfactory results. They had to lose in the early rounds of the Malaysia Open, India Open, and in the Indonesia Masters. She then competed at the Asia Mixed Team Championships in February, but unfortunately the teams lost in the quarter-finals to South Korea. She and her partner failed to go further in the All England Open, and then made it to the quarter-finals at the Swiss Open. In the quarter-final match against Ye Hong-wei and Lee Chia-hsin, Mentari and Rivaldy had to retire from the match due to an injury. In April, Mentari and Rivaldy reached the quarter-finals in the Asian Championships in Dubai, United Arab Emirates, lost the match to 8th seed Goh Soon Huat and Shevon Jemie Lai in three games.

In May, Mentari made her second appearance in the Sudirman Cup, but the team was eliminated in the quarter-finals. In the following week, Mentari competed in the second Asian Tour at the Malaysia Masters. Unfortunately, they lost in the quarter-finals to 3rd seed Korean pair Seo Seung-jae and Chae Yoo-jung.

In June, Mentari competed at the Singapore Open, but had to lose in the second round from 2nd seed and eventual finalist Japanese pair Yuta Watanabe and Arisa Higashino. In the next tour, she competed at the home tournament, Indonesia Open, but lost in the quarter-finals from 2nd seed and eventual finalist Japanese pair Yuta Watanabe and Arisa Higashino for the second consecutive tour. In the next tour, she lost at the second round of the Taipei Open from their fellow Indonesian junior player Jafar Hidayatullah and Aisyah Pranata.

In late July, Mentari competed at the 2023 Japan Open, but lost in the first round against 6th seed Korean pair Seo Seung-jae and Chae Yoo-jung.

In August, Mentari and her partner, Rivaldy, competed at the Australian Open, but had to lose in the quarter-finals from Chinese pair Cheng Xing and Chen Fanghui in straight games. At the World Championships, she and her partner lost in the third round from 4th seed Thai pair Dechapol Puavaranukroh and Sapsiree Taerattanachai in straight games. She then played at the Asian Games in Hangzhou, but unable to win any medals both in the mixed doubles and team events.

He also competed for Indonesia at the 2024 Summer Olympics.

== Achievements ==
=== SEA Games ===
Mixed doubles
Year	Venue	Partner	Opponent	Score	Result	Ref.
2019	Muntinlupa Sports Complex; Metro Manila, Philippines	(Indonesia) Rinov Rivaldy	(Malaysia) Goh Soon Huat (Malaysia) Shevon Jemie Lai	21–18, 11–21, 22–24	Bronze	
2021	Bac Giang Gymnasium; Bắc Giang, Vietnam	(Indonesia) Rinov Rivaldy	(Malaysia) Chen Tang Jie (Malaysia) Peck Yen Wei	22–20, 13–21, 18–21	Bronze	

=== BWF World Junior Championships ===
Mixed doubles
Year	Venue	Partner	Opponent	Score	Result	Ref.
2017	GOR Among Rogo; Yogyakarta, Indonesia	(Indonesia) Rinov Rivaldy	(Indonesia) Rehan Naufal Kusharjanto (Indonesia) Siti Fadia Silva Ramadhanti	21–23, 21–15, 21–18	Gold	

=== BWF World Tour (3 titles, 5 runners-up) ===
The BWF World Tour, which was announced on 19 March 2017 and implemented in 2018, is a series of elite badminton tournaments sanctioned by the Badminton World Federation (BWF). The BWF World Tour is divided into levels of World Tour Finals, Super 1000, Super 750, Super 500, Super 300, and the BWF Tour Super 100.

Mixed doubles
Year	Tournament	Level	Partner	Opponent	Score	Result	Ref.
2018	Indonesia Masters	Super 100	(Indonesia) Rinov Rivaldy	(Thailand) Nipitphon Phuangphuapet (Thailand) Savitree Amitrapai	21–19, 21–18	(gold) Winner	
2018	Syed Modi International	Super 300	(Indonesia) Rinov Rivaldy	(China) Ou Xuanyi (China) Feng Xueying	20–22, 10–21	(silver) Runner-up	
2019	Swiss Open	Super 300	(Indonesia) Rinov Rivaldy	(Denmark) Mathias Bay-Smidt (Denmark) Rikke Søby Hansen	18–21, 21–12, 16–21	(silver) Runner-up	
2021	Spain Masters	Super 300	(Indonesia) Rinov Rivaldy	(Denmark) Niclas Nøhr (Denmark) Amalie Magelund	21–18, 21–15	(gold) Winner	
2022	Malaysia Masters	Super 500	(Indonesia) Rinov Rivaldy	(China) Zheng Siwei (China) Huang Yaqiong	17–21, 12–21	(silver) Runner-up	
2024	Orléans Masters	Super 300	(Indonesia) Rinov Rivaldy	(China) Cheng Xing (China) Zhang Chi	21–16, 18–21, 15–21	(silver) Runner-up	
2024	Spain Masters	Super 300	(Indonesia) Rinov Rivaldy	(China) Cheng Xing (China) Zhang Chi	17–21, 21–12, 21–13	(gold) Winner	
2024	Malaysia Masters	Super 500	(Indonesia) Rinov Rivaldy	(Malaysia) Goh Soon Huat (Malaysia) Shevon Jemie Lai	18–21, 19–21	(silver) Runner-up	

=== BWF Junior International (2 titles, 1 runner-up) ===
Girls' doubles
Year	Tournament	Partner	Opponent	Score	Result	Ref.
2016	Granular Junior Open	(Indonesia) Virni Putri	(Thailand) Ruethaichanok Laisuan (Thailand) Alisa Sapniti	11–21, 21–13, 21–18	(gold) Winner	
2016	Indonesia Junior International	(Indonesia) Virni Putri	(Indonesia) Monika Insani (Indonesia) Dianita Saraswati	21–13, 21–14	(gold) Winner	

Mixed doubles
Year	Tournament	Partner	Opponent	Score	Result	Ref.
2016	Granular Junior Open	(Indonesia) Alfandy Rizki Kasturo	(Thailand) Pacharapol Nipornram (Thailand) Ruethaichanok Laisuan	12–21, 22–24	(silver) Runner-up	

BWF Junior International Grand Prix tournament
BWF Junior International Challenge tournament
BWF Junior International Series tournament
BWF Junior Future Series tournament

== Performance timeline ==
Key

W	Won	F	Finalist	SF	Semi-finalist
QF	Quarter-finalist	#R	Rounds 4, 3, 2, 1	RR	Round-robin stage
Q#	Qualification round	A	Absent	w/d	Withdrew
G	Gold	S	Silver	B	Bronze
NH	Not held	N/A	Not applicable	DNQ	Did not qualify

=== National team ===
- Senior level

Team events	2019	2020	2021	2022	2023	2024	2025	Ref
SEA Games	S	NH	S	NH	A	NH	A	
Asia Mixed Team Championships	A	NH			QF	NH	A	
Asian Games	NH			QF	NH			
Sudirman Cup	A	NH	QF	NH	QF	NH	B	

=== Individual competitions ===
==== Junior level ====
- Girls' doubles

Events	2017
Asian Junior Championships	QF
World Junior Championships	2R

- Mixed doubles

Events	2017	Ref
Asian Junior Championships	3R	
World Junior Championships	G	

==== Senior level ====
===== Women's doubles =====
Tournament	BWF Superseries / Grand Prix		BWF World Tour									Best	Ref
Tournament	2016	2017	2018	2019	2020	2021	2022	2023	2024	2025	2026	Best	Ref
Macau Open	A		1R	A	NH				A			1R ('18)	
Chinese Taipei Open	A		2R	A	NH		A					2R ('18)	
Indonesia Masters Super 100	NA		1R	A	NH		A	A			2R	2R ('26 I)	
Indonesia Masters Super 100	NA		1R	A	NH		A	A			1R	2R ('26 I)	
Vietnam Open	1R	A	SF	A	NH		A					SF ('18)	
Year-end ranking	215	182	155	—N/a	—N/a	—N/a	—N/a	—N/a	—N/a	—N/a	—N/a	130	
Tournament	2016	2017	2018	2019	2020	2021	2022	2023	2024	2025	2026	Best	Ref

===== Mixed doubles =====
Events	2019	2020	2021	2022	2023	2024	2025	Ref
SEA Games	B	NH	B	NH	A	NH		
Asian Championships	2R	NH		QF	QF	2R	QF	
Asian Games	NH			2R	NH			
World Championships	2R	NH	w/d	3R	3R	NH	2R	
Olympic Games	NH	DNQ	NH			RR	NH	

Tournament	BWF World Tour									Best	Ref
Tournament	2018	2019	2020	2021	2022	2023	2024	2025	2026	Best	Ref
Malaysia Open	A	2R	NH		2R	1R	1R	A		2R ('19, '22)	
India Open	A		NH		A	1R	1R	A		1R ('23, '24)	
Indonesia Masters	A	2R	1R	1R	QF	2R	2R	1R	A	QF ('22)	
Thailand Masters	A		1R	NH		A	1R	1R	A	1R ('20, '24, '25)	
German Open	A	2R	NH		QF	A	2R	A		QF ('22)	
All England Open	A	1R	2R	A	1R	1R	A			2R ('20)	
Swiss Open	A	F	NH	2R	1R	QF	1R	A		F ('19)	
Ruichang China Masters	QF	A	NH			A				QF ('18)	
Orléans Masters	A		NH	A		w/d	F	A		F ('24)	
Thailand Open	A	2R	1R	NH	A		SF	A		SF ('24)	
Thailand Open	A	2R	1R	NH	A		SF	A		SF ('24)	
Malaysia Masters	A	1R	1R	NH	F	QF	F	A		F ('22, '24)	
Singapore Open	QF	2R	NH		2R	2R	A	1R	A	QF ('18)	
Indonesia Open	A	1R	NH	1R	1R	QF	1R	1R	A	QF ('23)	
Australian Open	A		NH		w/d	QF	A			QF ('23)	
Macau Open	A		NH				A	1R	A	1R ('25)	
Japan Open	A	1R	NH		2R	1R	A			2R ('22)	
China Open	A	2R	NH			2R	A			2R ('19, '23)	
Taipei Open	QF	QF	NH		w/d	2R	A			QF ('18, '19)	
Korea Masters	2R	A	NH		2R	A				2R ('18, '22)	
China Masters	A	2R	NH			2R	A			2R ('19, '23)	
Indonesia Masters Super 100	W	A	NH		A	A			2R	W ('18)	
Indonesia Masters Super 100	W	A	NH		A	A			Q1	W ('18)	
Vietnam Open	SF	A	NH		A					SF ('18)	
Arctic Open	N/A		NH			A	QF	A		QF ('24)	
Denmark Open	A	1R	A	2R	1R	1R	QF	A		QF ('24)	
French Open	A	2R	NH	1R	2R	1R	1R	A		2R ('19, '22)	
Hylo Open	A			SF	QF	A				SF ('21)	
Korea Open	1R	SF	NH		SF	A				SF ('19, '22)	
Japan Masters	NH					2R	2R	A		2R ('23, '24)	
Hong Kong Open	A	1R	NH			QF	A			QF ('23)	
Syed Modi International	F	A	NH		A					F ('18)	
Superseries / World Tour Finals	DNQ				SF	DNQ				SF ('22)	
Akita Masters	SF	A	NH							SF ('18)	
New Zealand Open	A	1R	NH							1R ('19)	
Spain Masters	A	QF	A	W	NH	w/d	W	NH		W ('21, '24)	
Year-end ranking	28	21	18	22	9	18	18	65		9	
Tournament	2018	2019	2020	2021	2022	2023	2024	2025	2026	Best	Ref
