= Li Wenmei =

Chinese badminton player

Li Wenmei 李汶妹
Personal information
- Born: 2 November 1999 (age 27) Maoping, Hubei, China
- Height: 1.72 m (5 ft 8 in)

Sport
- Country: China
- Sport: Badminton
- Handedness: Right

Women's doubles
- Highest ranking: 9 (with Zheng Yu 14 January 2020)
- Current ranking: 83 (with Liu Xuanxuan 25 February 2025)
- BWF profile
Medal record
Women's badminton
Representing China
Sudirman Cup
Gold medal – first place	2021 Vantaa	Mixed team
Uber Cup
Gold medal – first place	2020 Aarhus	Women's team
Silver medal – second place	2022 Bangkok	Women's team
Asian Championships
Bronze medal – third place	2022 Manila	Women's doubles
World University Games
Gold medal – first place	2021 Chengdu	Women's doubles
Silver medal – second place	2021 Chengdu	Mixed team
World Junior Championships
Gold medal – first place	2017 Yogyakarta	Mixed team
Bronze medal – third place	2017 Yogyakarta	Girls' doubles
Bronze medal – third place	2017 Yogyakarta	Mixed doubles

Li Wenmei (Chinese: 李汶妹; pinyin: Lǐ Wènmèi; born 2 November 1999) is a Chinese badminton player from Maoping, Hubei. She began to play badminton at the age of seven and entered the Hubei team training centre in June 2010 as the singles player. She was selected to join the second team of Hubei province, who was trained by the former World Champion, Wei Yili, in April 2013. She represented Hubei province competed at the 2017 National Games of China in Tianjin, helps the team as the first singles and second doubles player achieved their best record for 42 years history by winning the silver medal at the Games. Li was part of the national junior team that won the gold medal at the 2017 World Junior Championships, and also claimed the bronze medals in the girls' and mixed doubles event. She won her first senior international title at the BWF Super 500 tournament 2020 Malaysia Masters partnered with Zheng Yu.

== Achievements ==
=== Asian Championships ===
Women's doubles
Year	Venue	Partner	Opponent	Score	Result
2022	Muntinlupa Sports Complex; Metro Manila, Philippines	(China) Du Yue	(China) Chen Qingchen (China) Jia Yifan	12–21, 17–21	Bronze

=== World University Games ===
Women's doubles
Year	Venue	Partner	Opponent	Score	Result	Ref.
2021	Shuangliu Sports Centre Gymnasium; Chengdu, China	(China) Liu Xuanxuan	(China) Du Yue (China) Xia Yuting	18–21, 21–19, 21–14	Gold	

=== World Junior Championships ===
Girls' doubles
Year	Venue	Partner	Opponent	Score	Result
2017	GOR Among Rogo; Yogyakarta, Indonesia	(China) Liu Xuanxuan	(South Korea) Baek Ha-na (South Korea) Lee Yu-rim	21–17, 18–21, 13–21	Bronze

Mixed' doubles
Year	Venue	Partner	Opponent	Score	Result
2017	GOR Among Rogo; Yogyakarta, Indonesia	(China) Liu Shiwen	(Indonesia) Rinov Rivaldy (Indonesia) Pitha Haningtyas Mentari	21–18, 16–21, 13–21	Bronze

=== BWF World Tour (2 titles, 3 runners-up) ===
The BWF World Tour, which was announced on 19 March 2017 and implemented in 2018, is a series of elite badminton tournaments sanctioned by the Badminton World Federation (BWF). The BWF World Tour is divided into levels of World Tour Finals, Super 1000, Super 750, Super 500, Super 300 (part of the HSBC World Tour), and the BWF Tour Super 100.

Women's doubles
Year	Tournament	Level	Partner	Opponent	Score	Result
2018	Lingshui China Masters	Super 100	(China) Huang Dongping	(China) Du Yue (China) Li Yinhui	16–21, 17–21	(silver) Runner-up
2019	Thailand Masters	Super 300	(China) Zheng Yu	(Thailand) Puttita Supajirakul (Thailand) Sapsiree Taerattanachai	21–15, 15–21, 10–21	(silver) Runner-up
2020	Malaysia Masters	Super 500	(China) Zheng Yu	(China) Du Yue (China) Li Yinhui	21–19, 16–21, 21–12	(gold) Winner
2024	China Open	Super 1000	(China) Zhang Shuxian	(China) Li Yijing (China) Luo Xumin	21–11, 18–21, 8–21	(silver) Runner-up
2024	Macau Open	Super 300	(China) Zhang Shuxian	(Chinese Taipei) Hsieh Pei-shan (Chinese Taipei) Hung En-tzu	25–23, 18–21, 22–20	(gold) Winner
