= Rehan Naufal Kusharjanto =

Indonesian badminton player (born 2000)

Personal information
- Born: 28 February 2000 (age 26) Bekasi, West Java, Indonesia
- Height: 168
- Weight: 70

Sport
- Country: Indonesia
- Sport: Badminton
- Handedness: Right

Men's & mixed doubles
- Highest ranking: 209 (MD with Pramudya Kusumawardana, 24 May 2018); 10 (XD with Lisa Ayu Kusumawati, 2 May 2023); 13 (XD with Gloria Emanuelle Widjaja, 23 September 2025); 78 (XD with Siti Fadia Silva Ramadhanti, 27 September 2018)
- Current ranking: 57 (XD with Gloria Emanuelle Widjaja, 16 June 2026)
- BWF profile
Medal record
Men's badminton
Representing Indonesia
Sudirman Cup
Bronze medal – third place	2025 Xiamen	Mixed team
SEA Games
Gold medal – first place	2023 Cambodia	Mixed doubles
Gold medal – first place	2023 Cambodia	Men's team
World Junior Championships
Silver medal – second place	2017 Yogyakarta	Mixed doubles
Silver medal – second place	2018 Markham	Mixed doubles
Bronze medal – third place	2018 Markham	Mixed team
Asian Junior Championships
Gold medal – first place	2017 Jakarta	Mixed doubles
Silver medal – second place	2017 Jakarta	Mixed team
Bronze medal – third place	2018 Jakarta	Mixed team

Rehan Naufal Kusharjanto (born 28 February 2000) is an Indonesian badminton player affiliated with Djarum club. He won the mixed doubles and men's team gold medals in 2023 SEA Games.

== Early life ==
His father Tri Kusharjanto, is an Olympic silver medalist in badminton in 2000, and his mother Sri Untari, was an Asian Champion in 1992. He started practicing badminton with his father at the age of 5, and joined the Djarum club in 2013. He was the champion at the 2016 Asian U-17 Junior Championships in the boys' doubles event partnered with Haffiz Nur Adila, and in 2017, he clinched the mixed doubles title at the Asian Junior Championships with Siti Fadia Silva Ramadhanti. He was also a two-times mixed doubles World Junior Championship silver medalists in 2017 and 2018 with Ramadhanti.

== Senior career ==
=== 2022 ===
In March, Kusharjanto and his partner Lisa Ayu Kusumawati reached their first BWF World Tour final in the Orléans Masters, but lost to Singaporean pair Terry Hee and Tan Wei Han. This year, they debuted at the BWF World Championships. In October, they reached another final in the Vietnam Open but lost to fellow Indonesians Dejan Ferdinansyah and Gloria Emanuelle Widjaja. They also reached the semi-finals of the French Open, but lost to Dutch pair Robin Tabeling and Selena Piek. In November, they claimed their first ever BWF World Tour title at the Hylo Open by defeating Feng Yanzhe and Huang Dongping in the final in straight games. Their progress, particularly their victory at the Hylo Open, led them to break through the world top 20 in mixed doubles.

=== 2023 ===
In the beginning of the 2023 season, Kusharjanto with his partner Kusumawati suffered a fourth consecutive early exit. They lost in the second round of the Malaysia Open, India Open, Thailand Masters, and in the first round of the Indonesia Masters. He then was called up to the Indonesian team for the Asia Mixed Team Championships, but the teams lost in the quarter-finals from South Korea. In March–April, Kusharjanto and Kusumawati reached the semi-finals in the All England Open and Orléans Masters, and also reached the quarter-finals in the Spain Masters. In Europe tour, they only suffered an early exits in the Swiss Open. He and his partner competed at the Asian Championships in Dubai, United Arab Emirates, but had to retire in the first round due to injury he suffered before the tournament begin. Kusharjanto made his debut at the SEA Games in Cambodia, and won the gold medals in the mixed doubles and team events. He and his father, Tri Kusharjanto, are the first parent-child pair who won SEA Games badminton gold medal.

Kusharjanto and Kusumawati then suffered a sixth consecutive early exit, stopped in the second round of the Malaysia Masters, Indonesia Open, and Taipei Open, and also in the first round of the Singapore Open, 2023 Japan Open, and Australian Open. In his second appearance at the World Championships, he and his partner lost in the third round from 2nd seed Japanese pair Yuta Watanabe and Arisa Higashino in straight games. The inconsistency in performance shown by the pair of Kusharjanto and Kusumawati continued into the China and Hong Kong Opens, where the pair again failed in the early rounds. Indonesian badminton fans then criticized Kusharjanto's posture which looked too fat, disproportionate like an athlete. Indonesia's mixed doubles coach, Herry IP, confirmed this; However, the Indonesian national team nutritionist, Paulina Toding, stated that Kusharjanto's fat mass index was normal close to the upper limit.

Kusharjanto made his debut at the Asian Games in Hangzhou, but unable to win any medals both in the mixed doubles and team events.

== Achievements ==
=== SEA Games ===
Mixed doubles
Year	Venue	Partner	Opponent	Score	Result	Ref.
2023	Morodok Techo Badminton Hall; Phnom Penh, Cambodia	(Indonesia) Lisa Ayu Kusumawati	(Malaysia) Yap Roy King (Malaysia) Cheng Su Yin	20–22, 21–8, 21–16	Gold	

=== World Junior Championships ===
Mixed doubles
Year	Venue	Partner	Opponent	Score	Result	Ref.
2017	GOR Among Rogo; Yogyakarta, Indonesia	(Indonesia) Siti Fadia Silva Ramadhanti	(Indonesia) Rinov Rivaldy (Indonesia) Pitha Haningtyas Mentari	23–21, 15–21, 18–21	Silver	
2018	Markham Pan Am Centre; Markham, Canada	(Indonesia) Siti Fadia Silva Ramadhanti	(Indonesia) Leo Rolly Carnando (Indonesia) Indah Cahya Sari Jamil	15–21, 9–21	Silver	

=== Asian Junior Championships ===
Mixed doubles
Year	Venue	Partner	Opponent	Score	Result	Ref.
2017	Jaya Raya Sports Hall Training Center; Jakarta, Indonesia	(Indonesia) Siti Fadia Silva Ramadhanti	(South Korea) Na Sung-seung (South Korea) Seong Ah-yeong	21–19, 19–21, 21–9	Gold	

=== BWF World Tour (1 title, 5 runners-up) ===
The BWF World Tour, which was announced on 19 March 2017 and implemented in 2018, is a series of elite badminton tournaments sanctioned by the Badminton World Federation (BWF). The BWF World Tours are divided into levels of World Tour Finals, Super 1000, Super 750, Super 500, Super 300, and the BWF Tour Super 100.

Mixed doubles
Year	Tournament	Level	Partner	Opponent	Score	Result	Ref.
2022	Orléans Masters	Super 100	(Indonesia) Lisa Ayu Kusumawati	(Singapore) Terry Hee (Singapore) Tan Wei Han	12–21, 21–16, 13–21	(silver) Runner-up	
2022	Vietnam Open	Super 100	(Indonesia) Lisa Ayu Kusumawati	(Indonesia) Dejan Ferdinansyah (Indonesia) Gloria Emanuelle Widjaja	13–21, 18–21	(silver) Runner-up	
2022	Hylo Open	Super 300	(Indonesia) Lisa Ayu Kusumawati	(China) Feng Yanzhe (China) Huang Dongping	21–17, 21–15	(gold) Winner	
2023	Hylo Open	Super 300	(Indonesia) Lisa Ayu Kusumawati	(Hong Kong) Tang Chun Man (Hong Kong) Tse Ying Suet	21–15, 15–21, 14–21	(silver) Runner-up	
2025	German Open	Super 300	(Indonesia) Gloria Emanuelle Widjaja	(Netherlands) Robin Tabeling (Denmark) Alexandra Bøje	17–21, 12–21	(silver) Runner-up	
2025	Orléans Masters	Super 300	(Indonesia) Gloria Emanuelle Widjaja	(Denmark) Jesper Toft (Denmark) Amalie Magelund	17–21, 13–21	(silver) Runner-up	

=== BWF International Challenge/Series (4 titles, 1 runner-up) ===
Men's doubles
Year	Tournament	Partner	Opponent	Score	Result	Ref.
2018	Finnish Open	(Indonesia) Pramudya Kusumawardana	(Indonesia) Akbar Bintang Cahyono (Indonesia) Muhammad Reza Pahlevi Isfahani	14–21, 17–21	(silver) Runner-up	

Mixed doubles
Year	Tournament	Partner	Opponent	Score	Result	Ref.
2017	Indonesia International	(Indonesia) Siti Fadia Silva Ramadhanti	(Indonesia) Irfan Fadhilah (Indonesia) Pia Zebadiah Bernadet	21–9, 21–18	(gold) Winner	
2019	Finnish Open	(Indonesia) Lisa Ayu Kusumawati	(Denmark) Mathias Bay-Smidt (Denmark) Rikke Søby Hansen	22–20, 15–21, 21–14	(gold) Winner	
2025	Polish Open	(Indonesia) Gloria Emanuelle Widjaja	(Denmark) Kristoffer Kolding (Denmark) Mette Werge	21–16, 14–21, 21–10	(gold) Winner	
2026 (II)	Indonesia International	(Indonesia) Melati Daeva Oktavianti	(Indonesia) Bagas Maulana (Indonesia) Apriyani Rahayu	21–19, 21–15	(gold) Winner	

BWF International Challenge tournament
BWF Future Series tournament

=== BWF Junior International (1 title, 3 runners-up) ===
Boys' doubles
Year	Tournament	Partner	Opponent	Score	Result	Ref.
2017	India Junior International	(Indonesia) Rinov Rivaldy	(Thailand) Pacharapol Nipornram (Thailand) Kunlavut Vitidsarn	21–9, 21–13	(gold) Winner	
2018	Malaysia Junior International	(Indonesia) Pramudya Kusumawardana	(Indonesia) Leo Rolly Carnando (Indonesia) Daniel Marthin	17–21, 12–21	(silver) Runner-up	

Mixed doubles
Year	Tournament	Partner	Opponent	Score	Result	Ref.
2017	Malaysia Junior International	(Indonesia) Siti Fadia Silva Ramadhanti	(Indonesia) Yeremia Rambitan (Indonesia) Angelica Wiratama	11–21, 16–21	(silver) Runner-up	
2018	Malaysia Junior International	(Indonesia) Siti Fadia Silva Ramadhanti	(Indonesia) Ghifari Anandaffa Prihardika (Indonesia) Lisa Ayu Kusumawati	19–21, 21–14, 16–21	(silver) Runner-up	

BWF Junior International Grand Prix tournament
BWF Junior International Challenge tournament
BWF Junior International Series tournament
BWF Junior Future Series tournament

== Performance timeline ==
Key

W	Won	F	Finalist	SF	Semi-finalist
QF	Quarter-finalist	#R	Rounds 4, 3, 2, 1	RR	Round-robin stage
Q#	Qualification round	A	Absent	w/d	Withdrew
G	Gold	S	Silver	B	Bronze
NH	Not held	N/A	Not applicable	DNQ	Did not qualify

=== National team ===
- Junior level

Team events	2017	2018
Asian Junior Championships	S	B
World Junior Championships	QF	B

- Senior level

Team events	2022	2023	2024	2025	Ref
SEA Games	NH	G	NH	A	
Asia Mixed Team Championships	NH	QF	NH	A	
Asian Games	QF	NH			
Sudirman Cup	NH	A	NH	B	

=== Individual competitions ===
==== Junior level ====
- Mixed doubles

Events	2017	2018	Ref
Asian Junior Championships	G	QF	
World Junior Championships	S	S	

==== Senior level ====
===== Men's doubles =====
Tournament	BWF World Tour	Best
Tournament	2018	Best
Orléans Masters	1R	1R ('18)
Vietnam Open	1R	1R ('18)
Year-end ranking	235	209
Tournament	2018	Best

===== Mixed doubles =====
Events	2021	2022	2023	2024	2025	2026	Ref
SEA Games	A	NH	G	NH	A	NH	
Asia Championships	NH	1R	1R	1R	A		
Asian Games	NH	1R	NH|				
World Championships	w/d	3R	3R	NH	DNQ	2R	

Tournament	BWF World Tour									Best	Ref
Tournament	2018	2019	2020	2021	2022	2023	2024	2025	2026	Best	Ref
Malaysia Open	A		NH		2R	2R	2R	A		2R ('22, '23, '24)	
India Open	A		NH		A	2R	2R	A		2R ('23, '24)	
Indonesia Masters	A	1R	A	1R	2R	1R	QF	A		QF ('24)	
Thailand Masters	2R	1R	A	NH		2R	SF	2R	A	SF ('24)	
German Open	A		NH		A		SF	F	A	F ('25)	
All England Open	A					SF	1R	QF	A	SF ('23)	
Swiss Open	A		NH	A	SF	2R	2R	A		SF ('22)	
Orléans Masters	2R	SF	NH	A	F	SF	A	F	A	F ('22, '25)	
Thailand Open	A			NH	1R	A	QF	A		QF ('24)	
Malaysia Masters	A			NH	1R	2R	QF	A		QF ('24)	
Singapore Open	A		NH		1R	1R	A	2R	1R	2R ('25)	
Indonesia Open	A		NH	1R	1R	2R	1R	1R	1R	2R ('23)	
Australian Open	A		NH		A	1R	1R	A	QF	QF ('25)	
Macau Open	A		NH				A	QF	A	QF ('25)	
Japan Open	A		NH		1R	1R	2R	2R	A	2R ('24, '25)	
China Open	A		NH			1R	A	QF	2R	QF ('25)	
Taipei Open	A		NH		w/d	2R	A	2R	SF	SF ('26)	
China Masters	A		NH			1R	A			2R ('23)	
Indonesia Masters Super 100	2R	SF	NH		A	A			SF	SF ('19, '26 I)	
Indonesia Masters Super 100	2R	SF	NH		A	A			1R	SF ('19, '26 I)	
Vietnam Open	2R	1R	NH		F	A			QF	F ('22)	
Arctic Open	N/A		NH			A	QF	A		QF ('24)	
Denmark Open	A				1R	1R	2R	A		2R ('24)	
Malaysia Super 100	N/A					A			SF	SF ('26)	
French Open	A		NH	A	SF	QF	1R	A		SF ('22)	
Hylo Open	A				W	F	A			W ('22)	
Korea Open	A		NH		A		2R	A		2R ('24)	
Japan Masters	NH					1R	2R	A		2R ('24)	
Kaohsiung Masters	NH					A			Q	('26)	
Hong Kong Open	A		NH			2R	A			2R ('23)	
Syed Modi International	A		NH		A				Q	('26)	
Hyderabad Open	2R	QF	NH							QF ('19)	
Russian Open	A	QF	NH							QF ('19)	
Spain Masters	A				NH	QF	QF	NH		QF ('23, '24)	
Year-end ranking	102	55	48	54	14	19	22	15		10	
Tournament	2018	2019	2020	2021	2022	2023	2024	2025	2026	Best	Ref
