= 2017 Badminton Asia Junior Championships – Mixed doubles =

Tournament details
- Dates: 26–30 July 2017
- Edition: 20
- Venue: Jaya Raya Sports Hall Training Center
- Location: Jakarta, Indonesia

The mixed doubles tournament of the 2017 Asian Junior Badminton Championships was held from July 26 to 30. The defending champions of the last edition were He Jiting and Du Yue from China. The host pair, No 5. seeds Rehan Naufal Kusharjanto and Siti Fadia Silva Ramadhanti claim the title after defeat the No. 3 seed from South Korea Na Sung-seung and Seong Ah-yeong in rubber games with the score 21–19, 19–21, 21–9.

== Seeded ==
1. (Indonesia) Rinov Rivaldy / Angelica Wiratama (third round)
2. (South Korea) Kim Moon-jun / Lee Yu-rim (third round)
3. (South Korea) Na Sung-seung / Seong Ah-yeong (Finals)
4. (Malaysia) Ng Eng Cheong / Toh Ee Wei (third round)
5. (Indonesia) Rehan Naufal Kusharjanto / Siti Fadia Silva Ramadhanti (champion)
6. (Malaysia) Chang Yee Jun / Pearly Tan Koong Le (quarterfinals)
7. (South Korea) Wang Chan / Kim Min-ji (semifinals)
8. (Indonesia) Yeremia Rambitan / Ribka Sugiarto (third round)

== Draw ==
=== Finals ===
Quarterfinals
(South Korea) Kang Min-hyuk (South Korea) Baek Ha-na	21	21
6	(Malaysia) Chang Yee Jun (Malaysia) Pearly Tan Koong Le	18	14
3	(South Korea) Na Sung-seung (South Korea) Seong Ah-yeong	21	21
(India) Dhruv Kapila (India) Mithula Umakant	18	11
7	(South Korea) Wang Chan (South Korea) Kim Min-ji	14	22	21
(China) Fan Qiuyue (China) Liu Xuanxuan	21	20	15
5	(Indonesia) Rehan Naufal Kusharjanto (Indonesia) Siti Fadia Silva Ramadhanti	21	19	21
(Malaysia) Man Wei Chong (Malaysia) Tan Sueh Jeou	18	21	17

Semifinals
(South Korea) Kang Min-hyuk (South Korea) Baek Ha-na	20	21	19
3	(South Korea) Na Sung-seung (South Korea) Seong Ah-yeong	22	18	21
7	(South Korea) Wang Chan (South Korea) Kim Min-ji	17	20
5	(Indonesia) Rehan Naufal Kusharjanto (Indonesia) Siti Fadia Silva Ramadhanti	21	22

Final
3	(South Korea) Na Sung-seung (South Korea) Seong Ah-yeong	19	21	9
5	(Indonesia) Rehan Naufal Kusharjanto (Indonesia) Siti Fadia Silva Ramadhanti	21	19	21

=== Top half ===
==== Section 1 ====
First round
(India) K P Garaga (India) R Panda	21	21
(Sri Lanka) R Hendahewa (Sri Lanka) L Hettiarachchi	6	12
(South Korea) Kang M-h (South Korea) Baek H-n	22	21
(Thailand) K Vitidsarn (Thailand) P Chaiwan	20	12

Second round
1	(Indonesia) R Rivaldy (Indonesia) A Wiratama	21	20	21
(India) K P Garaga (India) R Panda	12	22	18
(Kazakhstan) D Panarin (Kazakhstan) I Gordeyeva	9	9
(South Korea) Kang M-h (South Korea) Baek H-n	21	21

Third round
1	(Indonesia) R Rivaldy (Indonesia) A Wiratama	19	21	16
(South Korea) Kang M-h (South Korea) Baek H-n	21	19	21

==== Section 2 ====
First round
(Philippines) S Padiz Jr (Philippines) S J Barredo	14	16
(China) Wang C (China) Zhang SX	21	21
(Hong Kong) Lee C L (Hong Kong) Leung S L	13	18
(Chinese Taipei) Su L-w (Chinese Taipei) Li Z-q	21	21

Second round
6	(Malaysia) Chang Y J (Malaysia) P Tan	24	18	21
(China) Wang C (China) Zhang SX	22	21	17
(Myanmar) Aung M H (Myanmar) Thet H T	21	16	9
(Chinese Taipei) Su L-w (Chinese Taipei) Li Z-q	10	21	21

Third round
6	(Malaysia) Chang Y J (Malaysia) P Tan	21	23	28
(Chinese Taipei) Su L-w (Chinese Taipei) Li Z-q	17	25	26

==== Section 3 ====
First round
(Indonesia) R Samosir (Indonesia) H Julimarbela	21	21
(Nepal) P Maharjan (Nepal) R Maharjan	11	10
(Hong Kong) Lui C W (Hong Kong) Yeung P L	21	15	21
(Singapore) Toh H Z (Singapore) N I Khan	12	21	18

Second round
3	(South Korea) Na S-s (South Korea) Seong A-y	21	17	21
(Indonesia) R Samosir (Indonesia) H Julimarbela	18	21	12
(Thailand) N Trinkajee (Thailand) K Sudjaipraparat	21	22
(Hong Kong) Lui C W (Hong Kong) Yeung P L	9	20

Third round
3	(South Korea) Na s-s (South Korea) Seong A-y	21	21
(Thailand) N Trinkajee (Thailand) K Sudjaipraparat	18	19

==== Section 4 ====
First round
(Mongolia) S Enkhbat (Mongolia) G Baatarsuren	w	/	o
(Malaysia) Kwek Y J (Malaysia) Ng W W
(Chinese Taipei) Lu C (Chinese Taipei) Chang Y-t	24	18	20
(India) D Kapila (India) M Umakant	22	21	22
(China) Wu YF (China) Guo XY	21	21
(Uzbekistan) T Turakhonov (Uzbekistan) S Sodikova	9	5

Second round
8	(Indonesia) Y Rambitan (Indonesia) R Sugiarto	21	21
(Malaysia) Kwek Y J (Malaysia) Ng W W	16	8
(India) D Kapila (India) M Umakant	21	21
(China) Wu YF (China) Guo XY	19	16

Third round
8	(Indonesia) Y Rambitan (Indonesia) R Sugiarto	21	17	19
(India) D Kapila (India) M Umakant	15	21	21

=== Bottom half ===
==== Section 5 ====
First round
(Kazakhstan) I Yuldashev (Kazakhstan) A Zhumabek	13	13
(Singapore) R Loh (Singapore) J R Sito	21	21
(Indonesia) I L Prasetya (Indonesia) P H Mentari	21	21
(Uzbekistan) A Khadjaev (Uzbekistan) S Shavkatova	9	10
(Mongolia) M Batsukh (Mongolia) K Darkhanbaatar	7	3
(Chinese Taipei) Su P-w (Chinese Taipei) Tseng Y-c	21	21

Second round
(Singapore) R Loh (Singapore) J R Sito	11	18
(Indonesia) I L Prasetya (Indonesia) P H Mentari	21	21
(Chinese Taipei) Su P-w (Chinese Taipei) Tseng Y-c	17	21	8
7	(South Korea) Wang C (South Korea) Kim M-j	21	15	21

Third round
(Indonesia) I L Prasetya (Indonesia) P H Mentari	17	17
7	(South Korea) Wang C (South Korea) Kim M-j	21	21

==== Section 6 ====
First round
(Thailand) W Sothon (Thailand) S Paewsampran	10	24
(China) Fan QY (China) Liu XX	21	26
(Hong Kong) Chow H L (Hong Kong) Yeung S Y	21	21
(Sri Lanka) C Dias (Sri Lanka) D Dias	12	14

Second round
(China) Fan QY (China) Liu XX	16	21	21
(Indonesia) P K Riyanto (Indonesia) L A Kusumawati	21	13	16
(Hong Kong) Chow H L (Hong Kong) Yeung S Y	7	7
4	(Malaysia) Ng E C (Malaysia) Toh E W	21	21

Third round
(China) Fan QY (China) Liu XX	21	23
4	(Malaysia) Ng E C (Malaysia) Toh E W	19	21

==== Section 7 ====
First round
(Thailand) P Nipornram (Thailand) C Korepap	21	18	21
(China) Di ZJ (China) Zhou M	18	21	15
(Singapore) A Tan (Singapore) B Lim	12	15
(Chinese Taipei) Ye H-w (Chinese Taipei) Teng C-h	21	21

Second round
(Thailand) P Nipornram (Thailand) C Korepap	21	14	21
(Hong Kong) Ko S H (Hong Kong) Leung Y Y	18	21	16
(Chinese Taipei) Ye H-w (Chinese Taipei) Teng C-h	18	13
5	(Indonesia) R N Kusharjanto (Indonesia) S F S Ramadhanti	21	21

Third round
(Thailand) P Nipornram (Thailand) C Korepap	16	19
5	(Indonesia) R N Kusharjanto (Indonesia) S F S Ramadhanti	21	21

==== Section 8 ====
First round
(Macau) Pui P F (Macau) Gong X X	12	19
(Malaysia) Man W C (Malaysia) Tan S J	21	21
(Vietnam) Tran Q D (Vietnam) Pham N B	21	21
(Nepal) P K Lingthen (Nepal) S Mukhiya	13	11

Second round
(Malaysia) Man W C (Malaysia) Tan S J	21	21
(India) S S Dhanraj (India) T Samantaray	16	17
(Vietnam) Tran Q D (Vietnam) Pham N B	5	11
2	(South Korea) Kim M-j (South Korea) Lee Y-r	21	21

Third round
(Malaysia) Man W C (Malaysia) Tan S J	21	21
2	(South Korea) Kim M-j (South Korea) Lee Y-r	13	15
