= 2022 Indonesia Masters =

Badminton tournament in Indonesia

Tournament details
- Dates: 7–12 June
- Level: Super 500
- Total prize money: US$360,000
- Venue: Istora Gelora Bung Karno
- Location: Jakarta, Indonesia

Champions
- Men's singles: (Denmark) Viktor Axelsen
- Women's singles: (China) Chen Yufei
- Men's doubles: (Indonesia) Fajar Alfian (Indonesia) Muhammad Rian Ardianto
- Women's doubles: (China) Chen Qingchen (China) Jia Yifan
- Mixed doubles: (China) Zheng Siwei (China) Huang Yaqiong

The 2022 Indonesia Masters (officially known as the Daihatsu Indonesia Masters 2022 for sponsorship reasons) was a badminton tournament that took place at the Istora Gelora Bung Karno, Jakarta, Indonesia, from 7 to 12 June 2022 and had a total prize of US$360,000.

== Tournament ==
The 2022 Indonesia Masters was the tenth tournament of the 2022 BWF World Tour and was part of the Indonesia Masters championships, which had been held since 2010. This tournament was organized by the Badminton Association of Indonesia with sanction from the BWF.

=== Venue ===
This international tournament took place at the Istora Gelora Bung Karno inside the Gelora Bung Karno Sports Complex in Central Jakarta, Jakarta, Indonesia.

=== Point distribution ===
Below is the point distribution table for each phase of the tournament based on the BWF points system for the BWF World Tour Super 500 event.

| Winner | Runner-up | 3/4 | 5/8 | 9/16 | 17/32 | 33/64 | 65/128 |
|---|---|---|---|---|---|---|---|
| 9,200 | 7,800 | 6,420 | 5,040 | 3,600 | 2,220 | 880 | 430 |

=== Prize pool ===
The total prize money was US$360,000 with the distribution of the prize money in accordance with BWF regulations.

| Event | Winner | Finalist | Semi-finals | Quarter-finals | Last 16 |
| Singles | $27,000 | $13,680 | $5,220 | $2,160 | $1,260 |
| Doubles | $28,440 | $13,680 | $5,040 | $2,610 | $1,350 |

=== Controversy ===
On 10 June, reports emerged that players from several countries were hospitalized for food poisoning. The situation is currently being investigated by the Badminton Association of Indonesia and the Badminton World Federation.

== Men's singles ==
=== Seeds ===
1. (Denmark) Viktor Axelsen (champion)
2. (Denmark) Anders Antonsen (withdrew)
3. (Chinese Taipei) Chou Tien-chen (final)
4. (Indonesia) Anthony Sinisuka Ginting (semi-finals)
5. (Malaysia) Lee Zii Jia (quarter-finals)
6. (Indonesia) Jonatan Christie (first round)
7. (India) Lakshya Sen (quarter-finals)
8. (Singapore) Loh Kean Yew (semi-finals)

=== Finals ===
Semi-finals
1 | (Denmark) Viktor Axelsen | 21 | 21
4 | (Indonesia) Anthony Sinisuka Ginting | 15 | 15
3 | (Chinese Taipei) Chou Tien-chen | 21 | 8 | 21
8 | (Singapore) Loh Kean Yew | 16 | 21 | 19

Final
1 | (Denmark) Viktor Axelsen | 21 | 21
3 | (Chinese Taipei) Chou Tien-chen | 10 | 12

=== Top half ===
==== Section 1 ====
First round
1 | (Denmark) V Axelsen | 21 | 21
(Indonesia) S H Rhustavito | 14 | 7
(Chinese Taipei) Wang T-w | 21 | 21
PFQ | (Republic of Ireland) N Nguyen | 14 | 16
6 | (Indonesia) J Christie | 21 | 14 | 11
(China) Zhao JP | 10 | 21 | 21
(Hong Kong) Ng K L | 21 | 21
Q1 | (China) Weng HY | 18 | 17

Second round
1 | (Denmark) V Axelsen | 21 | 21
(Chinese Taipei) Wang T-w | 10 | 13
(China) Zhao JP | 9 | 21 | 10
(Hong Kong) Ng K L | 21 | 19 | 21

Quarter-finals
1 | (Denmark) V Axelsen | 21 | 21
(Hong Kong) Ng K L | 13 | 9

==== Section 2 ====
First round
4 | (Indonesia) A S Ginting | 16 | 21 | 21
(Thailand) K Vitidsarn | 21 | 16 | 18
PFQ | (Thailand) K Phetpradab | 24 | 11 | 11
(Thailand) S Thammasin | 22 | 21 | 21
5 | (Malaysia) Lee Z J | 21 | 21
(Thailand) K Wangcharoen | 16 | 12
Q2 | (China) Sun FX | 17 | 17
(Netherlands) M Caljouw | 21 | 21

Second round
4 | (Indonesia) A S Ginting | 21 | 21
(Thailand) S Thammasin | 13 | 14
5 | (Malaysia) Lee Z J | 21 | 21
(Netherlands) M Caljouw | 17 | 14

Quarter-finals
4 | (Indonesia) A S Ginting | 18 | 21 | 21
5 | (Malaysia) Lee Z J | 21 | 16 | 15

=== Bottom half ===
==== Section 3 ====
First round
(Denmark) R Gemke | 21 | 21
PFQ | (France) B Leverdez | 19 | 17
(Denmark) H-K Vittinghus | 10 | 18
7 | (India) L Sen | 21 | 21
(Indonesia) T Sugiarto | 21 | 9 | 17
(Hong Kong) Lee C Y | 17 | 21 | 21
Q3 | (Malaysia) Soong J V | 15 | 20
3 | (Chinese Taipei) Chou T-c | 21 | 22

Second round
(Denmark) R Gemke | 18 | 15
7 | (India) L Sen | 21 | 21
(Hong Kong) Lee C Y | 11 | 21 | 16
3 | (Chinese Taipei) Chou T-c | 21 | 18 | 21

Quarter-finals
7 | (India) L Sen | 16 | 21 | 14
3 | (Chinese Taipei) Chou T-c | 21 | 12 | 21

==== Section 4 ====
First round
(India) Sa Verma | 17 | 15
Q4 | (Indonesia) C A Dwi Wardoyo | 21 | 21
(France) T J Popov | 14 | 13
8 | (Singapore) Loh K Y | 21 | 21
(China) Lu GZ | 21 | 23
(Malaysia) Liew D | 16 | 21
(South Korea) Heo K-h | w | / | o
2 | (Denmark) A Antonsen

Second round
Q4 | (Indonesia) C A Dwi Wardoyo | 11 | 14
8 | (Singapore) Loh K Y | 21 | 21
(China) Lu GZ | 21 | 21
(South Korea) Heo K-h | 12 | 12

Quarter-finals
8 | (Singapore) Loh K Y | 21 | 21
(China) Lu GZ | 15 | 19

== Women's singles ==
=== Seeds ===
1. (China) Chen Yufei (champion)
2. (South Korea) An Se-young (second round)
3. (Spain) Carolina Marín (withdrew)
4. (India) P. V. Sindhu (quarter-finals)
5. (Thailand) Ratchanok Intanon (final)
6. (China) He Bingjiao (semi-finals)
7. (Thailand) Pornpawee Chochuwong (second round)
8. (Canada) Michelle Li (first round)

=== Finals ===
Semi-finals
1 | (China) Chen Yufei | 21 | 21
6 | (China) He Bingjiao | 17 | 14
5 | (Thailand) Ratchanok Intanon | 13 | 21 | 21
(China) Han Yue | 21 | 14 | 18

Final
1 | (China) Chen Yufei | 21 | 18 | 21
5 | (Thailand) Ratchanok Intanon | 16 | 21 | 15

=== Top half ===
==== Section 1 ====
First round
1 | (China) Chen YF | 21 | 21
(China) Wang ZY | 13 | 18
(United States) BW Zhang | 21 | 21
Q1 | (India) A Kashyap | 12 | 11
8 | (Canada) M Li | 12 | 21 | 14
(Thailand) B Ongbamrungphan | 21 | 17 | 21
(Belgium) L Tan | 17 | 8
(South Korea) Kim G-e | 21 | 21

Second round
1 | (China) Chen YF | 21 | 21
(United States) BW Zhang | 10 | 19
(Thailand) B Ongbamrungphan | 21 | 21
(South Korea) Kim G-e | 8 | 14

Quarter-finals
1 | (China) Chen YF | 21 | 21
(Thailand) B Ongbamrungphan | 11 | 15

==== Section 2 ====
First round
PFQ | (Japan) S Kawakami | 24 | 21
Q4 | (South Korea) Sim Y-j | 22 | 14
PFQ | (Denmark) J D Jakobsen | 5 | 12
(Denmark) L Kjærsfeldt | 21 | 21
6 | (China) He BJ | 21 | 21
Q2 | (Indonesia) P K Wardani | 16 | 14
(Thailand) S Katethong | 21 | 22
(Singapore) Yeo J M | 15 | 20

Second round
PFQ | (Japan) S Kawakami | 13 | 21 | 13
(Denmark) L Kjærsfeldt | 21 | 18 | 21
6 | (China) He BJ | 21 | 21
(Thailand) S Katethong | 14 | 15

Quarter-finals
(Denmark) L Kjærsfeldt | 20 | 14
6 | (China) He BJ | 22 | 21

=== Bottom half ===
==== Section 3 ====
First round
(Scotland) K Gilmour | 21 | 12 | 21
(China) Zhang YM | 17 | 21 | 15
PFQ | (Indonesia) R Hartawan | 13 | 16
5 | (Thailand) R Intanon | 21 | 21
(Indonesia) G M Tunjung | 21 | 21
(Thailand) P Chaiwan | 14 | 15
(Denmark) L Christophersen | 21 | 15 | 11
4 | (India) P. V. Sindhu | 18 | 21 | 21

Second round
(Scotland) K Gilmour | 17 | 21 | 15
5 | (Thailand) R Intanon | 21 | 19 | 21
(Indonesia) G M Tunjung | 21 | 22 | 11
4 | (India) P. V. Sindhu | 23 | 20 | 21

Quarter-finals
5 | (Thailand) R Intanon | 21 | 21
4 | (India) P. V. Sindhu | 12 | 10

==== Section 4 ====
First round
(China) Han Y | 13 | 21 | 21
(Japan) A Ohori | 21 | 15 | 9
Q3 | (Japan) A Takahashi | 18 | 8
7 | (Thailand) P Chochuwong | 21 | 21
(Chinese Taipei) Pai Y-p | 16 | 7
(United States) I Wang | 21 | 21
(Denmark) M Blichfeldt | 10 | 12
2 | (South Korea) An S-y | 21 | 21

Second round
(China) Han Y | 12 | 21 | 21
7 | (Thailand) P Chochuwong | 21 | 18 | 18
(United States) I Wang | 21 | 4
2 | (South Korea) An S-y | 19 | 1^{r}

Quarter-finals
(China) Han Y | 15 | 21 | 21
(United States) I Wang | 21 | 18 | 18

== Men's doubles ==
=== Seeds ===
1. (Indonesia) Marcus Fernaldi Gideon / Kevin Sanjaya Sukamuljo (semi-finals)
2. (Indonesia) Mohammad Ahsan / Hendra Setiawan (second round)
3. (Chinese Taipei) Lee Yang / Wang Chi-lin (quarter-finals)
4. (Malaysia) Aaron Chia / Soh Wooi Yik (quarter-finals)
5. (Indonesia) Fajar Alfian / Muhammad Rian Ardianto (champions)
6. (Denmark) Kim Astrup / Anders Skaarup Rasmussen (second round)
7. (Malaysia) Ong Yew Sin / Teo Ee Yi (first round)
8. (Malaysia) Goh Sze Fei / Nur Izzuddin (quarter-finals)

=== Finals ===
Semi-finals
1 | (Indonesia) Marcus Fernaldi Gideon (Indonesia) Kevin Sanjaya Sukamuljo | 17 | 10
Q2 | (China) Liang Weikeng (China) Wang Chang | 21 | 21
5 | (Indonesia) Fajar Alfian (Indonesia) Muhammad Rian Ardianto | 21 | 21
Q1 | (China) He Jiting (China) Zhou Haodong | 17 | 17

Final
Q2 | (China) Liang Weikeng (China) Wang Chang | 10 | 17
5 | (Indonesia) Fajar Alfian (Indonesia) Muhammad Rian Ardianto | 21 | 21

=== Top half ===
==== Section 1 ====
First round
1 | (Indonesia) M F Gideon (Indonesia) K S Sukamuljo | 21 | 21
(France) C Popov (France) T J Popov | 16 | 19
(Scotland) C Grimley (Scotland) M Grimley | 17 | 16
(Thailand) S Jomkoh (Thailand) K Kedren | 21 | 21
8 | (Malaysia) Goh S F (Malaysia) N Izzuddin | 21 | 21
(Scotland) A Dunn (Scotland) A Hall | 9 | 14
(Indonesia) S K Gutama (Indonesia) M R P Isfahani | 19 | 21 | 21
(Indonesia) M S Fikri (Indonesia) B Maulana | 21 | 12 | 16

Second round
1 | (Indonesia) M F Gideon (Indonesia) K S Sukamuljo | 21 | 8 | 21
(Thailand) S Jomkoh (Thailand) K Kedren | 14 | 21 | 18
8 | (Malaysia) Goh S F (Malaysia) N Izzuddin | 23 | 17 | 21
(Indonesia) S K Gutama (Indonesia) M R P Isfahani | 21 | 21 | 9

Quarter-finals
1 | (Indonesia) M F Gideon (Indonesia) K S Sukamuljo | 10 | 21 | 21
8 | (Malaysia) Goh S F (Malaysia) N Izzuddin | 21 | 11 | 18

==== Section 2 ====
First round
4 | (Malaysia) A Chia (Malaysia) Soh W Y | 21 | 21
Q4 | (Malaysia) Tan K M (Malaysia) Tan W K | 11 | 19
(England) B Lane (England) S Vendy | 21 | 13 | 12
(Indonesia) L R Carnando (Indonesia) D Marthin | 10 | 21 | 21
7 | (Malaysia) Ong Y S (Malaysia) Teo E Y | 15 | 19
Q3 | (China) Liu YC (China) Ou XY | 21 | 21
(Japan) H Okamura (Japan) M Onodera | 15 | 21
Q2 | (China) Liang WK (China) Wang C | 21 | 23

Second round
4 | (Malaysia) A Chia (Malaysia) Soh W Y | 27 | 21
(Indonesia) L R Carnando (Indonesia) D Marthin | 25 | 14
Q3 | (China) Liu YC (China) Ou XY | 17 | 13
Q2 | (China) Liang WK (China) Wang C | 21 | 21

Quarter-finals
4 | (Malaysia) A Chia (Malaysia) Soh W Y | 21 | 13 | 17
Q2 | (China) Liang WK (China) Wang C | 16 | 21 | 21

=== Bottom half ===
==== Section 3 ====
First round
(Indonesia) P Kusumawardana (Indonesia) Y Rambitan | 19 | 21 | 21
(India) M Attri (India) B. S Reddy | 21 | 11 | 8
PFQ | (Malaysia) Goh V S (Malaysia) Low J S | 14 | 17
5 | (Indonesia) F Alfian (Indonesia) M R Ardianto | 21 | 21
(Malaysia) N M Azriyn A (Malaysia) Lim K W | 21 | 15 | 17
(Singapore) T Hee (Singapore) Loh K H | 14 | 21 | 21
(Chinese Taipei) Lu C-y (Chinese Taipei) Yang P-ha | 15 | 17
3 | (Chinese Taipei) Lee Y (Chinese Taipei) Wang C-l | 21 | 21

Second round
(Indonesia) P Kusumawardana (Indonesia) Y Rambitan | 21 | 17 | 13
5 | (Indonesia) F Alfian (Indonesia) M R Ardianto | 16 | 21 | 21
(Singapore) T Hee (Singapore) Loh K H | 21 | 16
3 | (Chinese Taipei) Lee Y (Chinese Taipei) Wang C-l | 23 | 21

Quarter-finals
5 | (Indonesia) F Alfian (Indonesia) M R Ardianto | 21 | 21
3 | (Chinese Taipei) Lee Y (Chinese Taipei) Wang C-l | 15 | 18

==== Section 4 ====
First round
Q1 | (China) He JT (China) Zhou HD | 21 | 21
(South Korea) Kim G-j (South Korea) Kim S-r | 16 | 11
(France) F Delrue (France) W Villeger | 20 | 4
6 | (Denmark) K Astrup (Denmark) A S Rasmussen | 22 | 21
(South Korea) Choi S-g (South Korea) Kim W-h | 17 | 22
(South Korea) Kang M-h (South Korea) Seo S-j | 21 | 24
(Denmark) J Bay (Denmark) L Mølhede | 12 | 19
2 | (Indonesia) M Ahsan (Indonesia) H Setiawan | 21 | 21

Second round
Q1 | (China) He JT (China) Zhou HD | 22 | 21
6 | (Denmark) K Astrup (Denmark) A S Rasmussen | 20 | 13
(South Korea) Kang M-h (South Korea) Seo S-j | 21 | 18 | 21
2 | (Indonesia) M Ahsan (Indonesia) H Setiawan | 19 | 21 | 19

Quarter-finals
Q1 | (China) He JT (China) Zhou HD | 21 | 26 | 21
(South Korea) Kang M-h (South Korea) Seo S-j | 16 | 28 | 19

== Women's doubles ==
=== Seeds ===
1. (China) Chen Qingchen / Jia Yifan (champions)
2. (South Korea) Lee So-hee / Shin Seung-chan (quarter-finals)
3. (South Korea) Kim So-yeong / Kong Hee-yong (withdrew)
4. (Thailand) Jongkolphan Kititharakul / Rawinda Prajongjai (quarter-finals)
5. (Bulgaria) Gabriela Stoeva / Stefani Stoeva (first round)
6. (Malaysia) Pearly Tan / Thinaah Muralitharan (semi-finals)
7. (Indonesia) Apriyani Rahayu / Siti Fadia Silva Ramadhanti (final)
8. (China) Liu Xuanxuan / Xia Yuting (quarter-finals)

=== Finals ===
Semi-finals
1 | (China) Chen Qingchen (China) Jia Yifan | 21 | 21
(South Korea) Jeong Na-eun (South Korea) Kim Hye-jeong | 12 | 13
6 | (Malaysia) Pearly Tan (Malaysia) Thinaah Muralitharan | 23 | 14 | 14
7 | (Indonesia) Apriyani Rahayu (Indonesia) Siti Fadia Silva Ramadhanti | 21 | 21 | 21

Final
1 | (China) Chen Qingchen (China) Jia Yifan | 21 | 21
7 | (Indonesia) Apriyani Rahayu (Indonesia) Siti Fadia Silva Ramadhanti | 18 | 12

=== Top half ===
==== Section 1 ====
First round
1 | (China) Chen QC (China) Jia YF | 21 | 21
(Indonesia) F D Kusuma (Indonesia) A C Pratiwi | 12 | 13
PFQ | (Indonesia) M T Puspita Sari (Indonesia) R A Rose | 21 | 21
(India) A Ponnappa (India) N. S Reddy | 18 | 9
8 | (China) Liu XX (China) Xia YT | w | / | o
Q1
Q2 | (Indonesia) A N T Munggaran (Indonesia) A S Rahayu | 21 | 21
(Malaysia) Low Y Y (Malaysia) V Siow | 18 | 16

Second round
1 | (China) Chen QC (China) Jia YF | 21 | 21
PFQ | (Indonesia) M T Puspita Sari (Indonesia) R A Rose | 9 | 16
8 | (China) Liu XX (China) Xia YT | 21 | 21
Q2 | (Indonesia) A N T Munggaran (Indonesia) A S Rahayu | 7 | 13

Quarter-finals
1 | (China) Chen QC (China) Jia YF | 21 | 21
8 | (China) Liu XX (China) Xia YT | 8 | 13

==== Section 2 ====
First round
PFQ | (Indonesia) R Amelia (Indonesia) V Putri | 9 | 17
(Thailand) B Aimsaard (Thailand) N Aimsaard | 21 | 21
(South Korea) Jeong N-e (South Korea) Kim H-j | 21 | 21
(China) Zhang SX (China) Zheng Y | 16 | 19
5 | (Bulgaria) G Stoeva (Bulgaria) S Stoeva | 21 | 12 | 14
(Indonesia) F V D Gani (Indonesia) R Sugiarto | 18 | 21 | 21
PFQ | (Indonesia) A S Awanda (Indonesia) P Larasati | 9 | 21 | 16
(Indonesia) M Mamahit (Indonesia) T Nadia | 21 | 17 | 21

Second round
(Thailand) B Aimsaard (Thailand) N Aimsaard | 15 | 21 | 17
(South Korea) Jeong N-e (South Korea) Kim H-j | 21 | 18 | 21
(Indonesia) F V D Gani (Indonesia) R Sugiarto | 21 | 21
(Indonesia) M Mamahit (Indonesia) T Nadia | 10 | 12

Quarter-finals
(South Korea) Jeong N-e (South Korea) Kim H-j | 21 | 21
(Indonesia) F V D Gani (Indonesia) R Sugiarto | 16 | 18

=== Bottom half ===
==== Section 3 ====
First round
(Malaysia) A Cheong (Malaysia) Teoh M X | 14 | 13
(South Korea) Baek H-n (South Korea) Lee Y-r | 21 | 21
(France) M Lambert (France) A Tran | 13 | 18
6 | (Malaysia) P Tan (Malaysia) Thinaah M | 21 | 21
Q3 | (Indonesia) T M Rahma (Indonesia) B Wardana | 14 | 21 | 15
PFQ | (Indonesia) A Kamila (Indonesia) A Z D Ramadhani | 21 | 18 | 21
(Ukraine) M Stoliarenko (Ukraine) Y Zharka | 8 | 14
4 | (Thailand) J Kititharakul (Thailand) R Prajongjai | 21 | 21

Second round
(South Korea) Baek H-n (South Korea) Lee Y-r | 23 | 17 | 15
6 | (Malaysia) P Tan (Malaysia) Thinaah M | 21 | 21 | 21
PFQ | (Indonesia) A Kamila (Indonesia) A Z D Ramadhani | 6 | 15
4 | (Thailand) J Kititharakul (Thailand) R Prajongjai | 21 | 21

Quarter-finals
6 | (Malaysia) P Tan (Malaysia) Thinaah M | 21 | 21
4 | (Thailand) J Kititharakul (Thailand) R Prajongjai | 11 | 16

==== Section 4 ====
First round
(Denmark) J F-Ipsen (Denmark) M Surrow | 17 | 7
(Malaysia) V Hoo (Malaysia) Lim C S | 21 | 21
(Netherlands) D Jille (Netherlands) C Seinen | 12 | 9
7 | (Indonesia) A Rahayu (Indonesia) S F S Ramadhanti | 21 | 21
(China) Du Y (China) Li WM | 21 | 21
Q4 | (Indonesia) I S Meida (Indonesia) R K Nastine | 8 | 8
(India) S Singhi (India) R Thaker | 10 | 11
2 | (South Korea) Lee S-h (South Korea) Shin S-c | 21 | 21

Second round
(Malaysia) V Hoo (Malaysia) Lim C S | 17 | 19
7 | (Indonesia) A Rahayu (Indonesia) S F S Ramadhanti | 21 | 21
(China) Du Y (China) Li WM | 14 | 14
2 | (South Korea) Lee S-h (South Korea) Shin S-c | 21 | 21

Quarter-finals
7 | (Indonesia) A Rahayu (Indonesia) S F S Ramadhanti | 15 | 21 | 21
2 | (South Korea) Lee S-h (South Korea) Shin S-c | 21 | 16 | 16

== Mixed doubles ==
=== Seeds ===
1. (Thailand) Dechapol Puavaranukroh / Sapsiree Taerattanachai (first round)
2. (China) Zheng Siwei / Huang Yaqiong (champions)
3. (China) Wang Yilyu / Huang Dongping (quarter-finals)
4. (Indonesia) Praveen Jordan / Melati Daeva Oktavianti (second round)
5. (South Korea) Seo Seung-jae / Chae Yoo-jung (semi-finals)
6. (Hong Kong) Tang Chun Man / Tse Ying Suet (quarter-finals)
7. (Malaysia) Tan Kian Meng / Lai Pei Jing (first round)
8. (England) Marcus Ellis / Lauren Smith (second round)

=== Finals ===
Semi-finals
(France) Thom Gicquel (France) Delphine Delrue | 22 | 21
(Thailand) Supak Jomkoh (Thailand) Supissara Paewsampran | 20 | 12
5 | (South Korea) Seo Seung-jae (South Korea) Chae Yoo-jung | 21 | 14 | 12
2 | (China) Zheng Siwei (China) Huang Yaqiong | 19 | 21 | 21

Final
(France) Thom Gicquel (France) Delphine Delrue | 13 | 14
2 | (China) Zheng Siwei (China) Huang Yaqiong | 21 | 21

=== Top half ===
==== Section 1 ====
First round
1 | (Thailand) D Puavaranukroh (Thailand) S Taerattanachai | 19 | 16
(France) T Gicquel (France) D Delrue | 21 | 21
(Denmark) M Christiansen (Denmark) A Bøje | 21 | 11 | 21
Q4 | (Malaysia) Choong H J (Malaysia) Peck Y W | 13 | 21 | 19
6 | (Hong Kong) Tang C M (Hong Kong) Tse Y S | 21 | 21
(Netherlands) R Tabeling (Netherlands) S Piek | 9 | 16
(Malaysia) Hoo P R (Malaysia) Toh E W | 21 | 21
(Hong Kong) Chang T C (Hong Kong) Ng W Y | 19 | 13

Second round
(France) T Gicquel (France) D Delrue | 22 | 21 | 22
(Denmark) M Christiansen (Denmark) A Bøje | 24 | 19 | 20
6 | (Hong Kong) Tang C M (Hong Kong) Tse Y S | 20 | 21 | 21
(Malaysia) Hoo P R (Malaysia) Toh E W | 22 | 5 | 15

Quarter-finals
(France) T Gicquel (France) D Delrue | 21 | 21
6 | (Hong Kong) Tang C M (Hong Kong) Tse Y S | 15 | 10

==== Section 2 ====
First round
4 | (Indonesia) P Jordan (Indonesia) M D Oktavianti | 21 | 16 | 21
(India) I Bhatnagar (India) T Crasto | 14 | 21 | 12
(Indonesia) R Rivaldy (Indonesia) P H Mentari | 21 | 21
(Malaysia) Chen T J (Malaysia) V Siow | 17 | 7
7 | (Malaysia) Tan K M (Malaysia) Lai P J | 21 | 19 | 17
Q1 | (Japan) H Midorikawa (Japan) N Saito | 8 | 21 | 21
(Malaysia) Goh S H (Malaysia) S J Lai | 17 | 17
(Thailand) S Jomkoh (Thailand) S Paewsampran | 21 | 21

Second round
4 | (Indonesia) P Jordan (Indonesia) M D Oktavianti | 16 | 16
(Indonesia) R Rivaldy (Indonesia) P H Mentari | 21 | 21
Q1 | (Japan) H Midorikawa (Japan) N Saito | 12 | 22 | 20
(Thailand) S Jomkoh (Thailand) S Paewsampran | 21 | 20 | 22

Quarter-finals
(Indonesia) R Rivaldy (Indonesia) P H Mentari | 13 | 14
(Thailand) S Jomkoh (Thailand) S Paewsampran | 21 | 21

=== Bottom half ===
==== Section 3 ====
First round
(Malaysia) Soong J V (Malaysia) Goh L Y | 17 | 10
(Malaysia) Chan P S (Malaysia) Cheah Y S | 21 | 21
(Indonesia) A Maulana (Indonesia) M C Bandaso | 2^{r}
5 | (South Korea) Seo S-j (South Korea) Chae Y-j | 6
(Indonesia) R N Kusharjanto (Indonesia) L A Kusumawati | 21 | 22
(Scotland) A Hall (Scotland) J MacPherson | 11 | 20
(China) Guo XW (China) Zhang SX | 18 | 18
3 | (China) Wang YL (China) Huang DP | 21 | 21

Second round
(Malaysia) Chan P S (Malaysia) Cheah Y S
5 | (South Korea) Seo S-j (South Korea) Chae Y-j | w | / | o
(Indonesia) R N Kusharjanto (Indonesia) L A Kusumawati | 18 | 9
3 | (China) Wang YL (China) Huang DP | 21 | 21

Quarter-finals
5 | (South Korea) Seo S-j (South Korea) Chae Y-j | 19 | 21 | 21
3 | (China) Wang YL (China) Huang DP | 21 | 10 | 14

==== Section 4 ====
First round
Q3 | (China) Feng YZ (China) Lin FL | 18 | 16
(South Korea) Ko S-h (South Korea) Eom H-w | 21 | 21
(Egypt) A H Elgamal (Egypt) D Hany | 7 | 11
8 | (England) M Ellis (England) L Smith | 21 | 21
Q2 | (India) B. S Reddy (India) A Ponnappa | 21 | 21
(Indonesia) H Faizal (Indonesia) S Kani | 15 | 14
(Singapore) T Hee (Singapore) Tan W H | 10 | 8
2 | (China) Zheng SW (China) Huang YQ | 21 | 21

Second round
(South Korea) Ko S-h (South Korea) Eom H-w | 21 | 13 | 21
8 | (England) M Ellis (England) L Smith | 10 | 21 | 11
Q2 | (India) B. S Reddy (India) A Ponnappa | 18 | 13
2 | (China) Zheng SW (China) Huang YQ | 21 | 21

Quarter-finals
(South Korea) Ko S-h (South Korea) Eom H-w | 8 | 14
2 | (China) Zheng SW (China) Huang YQ | 21 | 21

| Preceded by 2022 Thailand Open | BWF World Tour; 2022 BWF season | Succeeded by 2022 Indonesia Open |
