= 2025 All England Open =

Badminton tournament in England

Tournament details
- Dates: 11–16 March
- Edition: 115th
- Level: Super 1000
- Total prize money: US$1,450,000
- Venue: Utilita Arena Birmingham
- Location: Birmingham, England

Champions
- Men's singles: (China) Shi Yuqi
- Women's singles: (South Korea) An Se-young
- Men's doubles: (South Korea) Kim Won-ho (South Korea) Seo Seung-jae
- Women's doubles: (Japan) Nami Matsuyama (Japan) Chiharu Shida
- Mixed doubles: (China) Guo Xinwa (China) Chen Fanghui

The 2025 All England Open, officially known as the Yonex All England Open Badminton Championships 2025 for sponsorship reasons, was an badminton tournament that took place at the Utilita Arena Birmingham, Birmingham, England, from 11 to 16 March 2025 and had a total prize of US$1,450,000.

== Tournament ==
The 2025 All England Open was the seventh tournament of the 2025 BWF World Tour and wa part of the All England Open championships, which have been held since 1899. This tournament is organized by the Badminton England with sanction from the BWF.

=== Venue ===
This tournament has been held at the Utilita Arena Birmingham in Birmingham, England.

=== Point distribution ===
Below is the point distribution table for each phase of the tournament based on the BWF points system for the BWF World Tour Super 1000 event.

Winner	Runner-up	3/4	5/8	9/16	17/32
12,000	10,200	8,400	6,600	4,800	3,000

=== Prize pool ===
The total prize money is US$1,450,000 with the distribution of the prize money in accordance with BWF regulations.

Event	Winner	Finalist	Semi-finals	Quarter-finals	Last 16	Last 32
Singles	$101,500	$49,300	$20,300	$7,975	$4,350	$1,450
Doubles	$107,300	$50,750	$20,300	$9,062.50	$4,712.50	$1,450

== Men's singles ==
=== Seeds ===
1. (China) Shi Yuqi (champion)
2. (Denmark) Anders Antonsen (second round)
3. (Indonesia) Jonatan Christie (second round)
4. (Denmark) Viktor Axelsen (first round)
5. (Thailand) Kunlavut Vitidsarn (second round)
6. (China) Li Shifeng (semi-finals)
7. (Malaysia) Lee Zii Jia (first round)
8. (Japan) Kodai Naraoka (first round)

=== Finals ===
Semi-finals
1	(China) Shi Yuqi	21	20	21
6	(China) Li Shifeng	9	22	19
(Chinese Taipei) Lee Chia-hao	19	21	21
(France) Alex Lanier	21	14	17

Final
1	(China) Shi Yuqi	21	21
(Chinese Taipei) Lee Chia-hao	17	19

=== Top half ===
==== Section 1 ====
First round
1	(China) Shi YQ	21	21
(Indonesia) C A D Wardoyo	13	8
(Chinese Taipei) Chou T-c	21	21
(France) C Popov	10	12
7	(Malaysia) Lee Z J	21	16	12
(Hong Kong) Ng K L	19	21	21
(Singapore) J Teh	18	21	16
(Singapore) Loh K Y	21	19	21

Second round
1	(China) Shi YQ	21	21
(Chinese Taipei) Chou T-c	11	19
(Hong Kong) Ng K L	15	17
(Singapore) Loh K Y	21	21

Quarter-finals
1	(China) Shi YQ	21	21
(Singapore) Loh K Y	18	16

==== Section 2 ====
First round
3	(Indonesia) J Christie	21	21
(Malaysia) Leong J H	11	19
PFR	(Chinese Taipei) Su L-y	21	17	15
(India) L Sen	13	21	21
6	(China) Li SF	21	18	21
PFR	(Canada) B Yang	11	21	16
(France) T J Popov	21	21
(India) Prannoy H. S.	19	16

Second round
3	(Indonesia) J Christie	13	10
(India) L Sen	21	21
6	(China) Li SF	21	17	21
(France) T J Popov	18	21	15

Quarter-finals
(India) L Sen	10	16
6	(China) Li SF	21	21

=== Bottom half ===
==== Section 3 ====
First round
(Chinese Taipei) Lee C-h	21	16	25
(Hong Kong) Lee C Y	16	21	23
(Japan) Y Tanaka	21	15	21
8	(Japan) K Naraoka	13	21	9
(Japan) K Nishimoto	21	21
(China) Lei LX	19	15
(Chinese Taipei) Lin C-y	21	13	21
4	(Denmark) V Axelsen	19	21	11

Second round
(Chinese Taipei) Lee C-h	21	21
(Japan) Y Tanaka	18	8
(Japan) K Nishimoto	21	21
(Chinese Taipei) Lin C-y	10	18

Quarter-finals
(Chinese Taipei) Lee C-h	21	21
(Japan) K Nishimoto	9	18

==== Section 4 ====
First round
(Denmark) R Gemke	10	18
(France) A Lanier	21	21
(China) Weng HY	20	11
5	(Thailand) K Vitidsarn	22	21
(China) Lu GZ	13	16
(Chinese Taipei) Wang T-w	21	21
(Chinese Taipei) Chi Y-j	15	8
2	(Denmark) A Antonsen	21	21

Second round
(France) A Lanier	22	21
5	(Thailand) K Vitidsarn	20	15
(Chinese Taipei) Wang T-w	21	21
2	(Denmark) A Antonsen	10	13

Quarter-finals
(France) A Lanier	21	21
(Chinese Taipei) Wang T-w	19	13

== Women's singles ==
=== Seeds ===
1. (South Korea) An Se-young (champion)
2. (China) Wang Zhiyi (finals)
3. (Japan) Akane Yamaguchi (semi-finals)
4. (China) Han Yue (semi-finals)
5. (Indonesia) Gregoria Mariska Tunjung (quarter-finals)
6. (Thailand) Pornpawee Chochuwong (quarter-finals)
7. (Japan) Tomoka Miyazaki (quarter-finals)
8. (Thailand) Supanida Katethong (first round)

=== Finals ===
Semi-finals
1	(South Korea) An Se-young	21	21
3	(Japan) Akane Yamaguchi	12	17
4	(China) Han Yue	10	19
2	(China) Wang Zhiyi	21	21

Final
1	(South Korea) An Se-young	13	21	21
2	(China) Wang Zhiyi	21	18	18

=== Top half ===
==== Section 1 ====
First round
1	(South Korea) An S-y	21	21
(China) Gao FJ	16	14
(Chinese Taipei) Sung S-y	18	16
(Scotland) K Gilmour	21	21
8	(Thailand) S Katethong	13	11
(Indonesia) P K Wardani	21	21
(Denmark) L Kjærsfeldt	10	18
(China) Chen YF	21	21

Second round
1	(South Korea) An S-y	21	16	21
(Scotland) K Gilmour	12	21	8
(Indonesia) P K Wardani	14	24	10
(China) Chen YF	21	22	21

Quarter-finals
1	(South Korea) An S-y	21	21
(China) Chen YF	9	14

==== Section 2 ====
First round
3	(Japan) A Yamaguchi	21	21
(Vietnam) Nguyễn T L	19	12
(Singapore) Yeo J M	13	21	17
(India) M Bansod	21	10	21
7	(Japan) T Miyazaki	21	21
(Denmark) J D Jakobsen	6	17
(United States) BW Zhang	12	21	21
(Thailand) R Intanon	21	18	19

Second round
3	(Japan) A Yamaguchi	21	21
(India) M Bansod	16	13
7	(Japan) T Miyazaki	21	10	21
(United States) BW Zhang	18	21	17

Quarter-finals
3	(Japan) A Yamaguchi	26	21
7	(Japan) T Miyazaki	24	16

=== Bottom half ===
==== Section 3 ====
First round
(South Korea) Sim Y-j	21	21
(Japan) K Sugiyama	6	17
(Canada) M Li	18	17
5	(Indonesia) G M Tunjung	21	21
(South Korea) Kim G-e	19	21	21
(India) P. V. Sindhu	21	13	13
(Chinese Taipei) Pai Y-p	11	9
4	(China) Han Y	21	21

Second round
(South Korea) Sim Y-j	18	19
5	(Indonesia) G M Tunjung	21	21
(South Korea) Kim G-e	5^{r}
4	(China) Han Y	14

Quarter-finals
5	(Indonesia) G M Tunjung	15	17
4	(China) Han Y	21	21

==== Section 4 ====
First round
(Thailand) B Ongbamrungphan	16	9
(Chinese Taipei) Chiu P-c	21	21
(Japan) N Nidaira	21	13	16
6	(Thailand) P Chochuwong	19	21	21
(Denmark) M Blichfeldt	18	16
(Chinese Taipei) Hsu W-c	21	21
(Japan) N Okuhara	6	9
2	(China) Wang ZY	21	21

Second round
(Chinese Taipei) Chiu P-c	13	7
6	(Thailand) P Chochuwong	21	21
(Chinese Taipei) Hsu W-c	11	16
2	(China) Wang ZY	21	21

Quarter-finals
6	(Thailand) P Chochuwong	16	12
2	(China) Wang ZY	21	21

== Men's doubles ==
=== Seeds ===
1. (Denmark) Kim Astrup / Anders Skaarup Rasmussen (first round)
2. (Malaysia) Goh Sze Fei / Nur Izzuddin (second round)
3. (China) Liang Weikeng / Wang Chang (first round)
4. (Indonesia) Fajar Alfian / Muhammad Rian Ardianto (second round)
5. (Malaysia) Aaron Chia / Soh Wooi Yik (first round)
6. (China) He Jiting / Ren Xiangyu (semi-finals)
7. (India) Satwiksairaj Rankireddy / Chirag Shetty (second round)
8. (Chinese Taipei) Lee Jhe-huei / Yang Po-hsuan (quarter-finals)

=== Finals ===
Semi-finals
(Indonesia) Leo Rolly Carnando (Indonesia) Bagas Maulana	21	17	21
(Indonesia) Sabar Karyaman Gutama (Indonesia) Muhammad Reza Pahlevi Isfahani	14	21	15
6	(China) He Jiting (China) Ren Xiangyu	21	13	13
(South Korea) Kim Won-ho (South Korea) Seo Seung-jae	16	21	21

Final
(Indonesia) Leo Rolly Carnando (Indonesia) Bagas Maulana	19	19
(South Korea) Kim Won-ho (South Korea) Seo Seung-jae	21	21

=== Top half ===
==== Section 1 ====
First round
1	(Denmark) K Astrup (Denmark) A S Rasmussen	20	18
(Indonesia) M S Fikri (Indonesia) D Marthin	22	21
(Chinese Taipei) Lee F-c (Chinese Taipei) Lee F-j	14	11
(Indonesia) L R Carnando (Indonesia) B Maulana	21	21
8	(Chinese Taipei) Lee J-h (Chinese Taipei) Yang P-hs	21	16	21
(Japan) K Mitsuhashi (Japan) H Okamura	13	21	7
(Malaysia) Ong Y S (Malaysia) Teo E Y	18	19
(England) B Lane (England) S Vendy	21	21

Second round
(Indonesia) M S Fikri (Indonesia) D Marthin	19	17
(Indonesia) L R Carnando (Indonesia) B Maulana	21	21
8	(Chinese Taipei) Lee J-h (Chinese Taipei) Yang P-hs	23	23
(England) B Lane (England) S Vendy	21	21

Quarter-finals
(Indonesia) L R Carnando (Indonesia) B Maulana	21	20	22
8	(Chinese Taipei) Lee J-h (Chinese Taipei) Yang P-hs	11	22	20

==== Section 2 ====
First round
3	(China) Liang WK (China) Wang C	17	20
(Indonesia) S K Gutama (Indonesia) M R P Isfahani	21	22
(China) Huang D (China) Liu Y	21	16	21
(Malaysia) J Arif (Malaysia) Yap R K	18	21	17
5	(Malaysia) A Chia (Malaysia) Soh W Y	16	21	18
(Denmark) R Kjær (Denmark) F Søgaard	21	16	21
(Chinese Taipei) Liu K-h (Chinese Taipei) Yang P-ha	21	21
(France) C Popov (France) T J Popov	17	18

Second round
(Indonesia) S K Gutama (Indonesia) M R P Isfahani	21	21
(China) Huang D (China) Liu Y	6	18
(Denmark) R Kjær (Denmark) F Søgaard	15	16
(Chinese Taipei) Liu K-h (Chinese Taipei) Yang P-ha	21	21

Quarter-finals
(Indonesia) S K Gutama (Indonesia) M R P Isfahani	21	21
(Chinese Taipei) Liu K-h (Chinese Taipei) Yang P-ha	11	17

=== Bottom half ===
==== Section 3 ====
First round
(Thailand) P Sukphun (Thailand) P Teeraratsakul	21	21
(Denmark) A Søndergaard (Denmark) J Toft	11	18
(Malaysia) Man W C (Malaysia) Tee K W	15	8
6	(China) He JT (China) Ren XY	21	21
(Malaysia) N M Azriyn A (Malaysia) Tan W K	14	12
(South Korea) Kang M-h (South Korea) Ki D-j	21	21
(China) Chen BY (China) Liu Y	17	21	17
4	(Indonesia) F Alfian (Indonesia) M R Ardianto	21	15	21

Second round
(Thailand) P Sukphun (Thailand) P Teeraratsakul	11	18
6	(China) He JT (China) Ren XY	21	21
(South Korea) Kang M-h (South Korea) Ki D-j	21	25	23
4	(Indonesia) F Alfian (Indonesia) M R Ardianto	18	27	21

Quarter-finals
6	(China) He JT (China) Ren XY	21	21
(South Korea) Kang M-h (South Korea) Ki D-j	19	15

==== Section 4 ====
First round
(Chinese Taipei) Chiu H-c (Chinese Taipei) Wang C-l	19	21	21
(China) Xie HN (China) Zeng WH	21	15	23
(Denmark) D Lundgaard (Denmark) M Vestergaard	17	15
7	(India) S Rankireddy (India) C Shetty	21	21
(Thailand) K Kedren (Thailand) D Puavaranukroh	13	7
(South Korea) Kim W-h (South Korea) Seo S-j	21	21
(South Korea) Kim G-j (South Korea) Kim S-r	17	14
2	(Malaysia) Goh S F (Malaysia) N Izzuddin	21	21

Second round
(China) Xie HN (China) Zeng WH	21	2
7	(India) S Rankireddy (India) C Shetty	16	2^{r}
(South Korea) Kim W-h (South Korea) Seo S-j	21	21
2	(Malaysia) Goh S F (Malaysia) N Izzuddin	16	13

Quarter-finals
(China) Xie HN (China) Zeng WH	19	10
(South Korea) Kim W-h (South Korea) Seo S-j	21	21

== Women's doubles ==
=== Seeds ===
1. (South Korea) Baek Ha-na / Lee So-hee (second round)
2. (China) Liu Shengshu / Tan Ning (semi-finals)
3. (Japan) Nami Matsuyama / Chiharu Shida (champions)
4. (Japan) Rin Iwanaga / Kie Nakanishi (quarter-finals)
5. (Malaysia) Pearly Tan / Thinaah Muralitharan (quarter-finals)
6. (Japan) Yuki Fukushima / Mayu Matsumoto (final)
7. (China) Li Yijing / Luo Xumin (quarter-finals)
8. (South Korea) Kim Hye-jeong / Kong Hee-yong (second round)

=== Finals ===
Semi-finals
(China) Jia Yifan (China) Zhang Shuxian	16	17
6	(Japan) Yuki Fukushima (Japan) Mayu Matsumoto	21	21
3	(Japan) Nami Matsuyama (Japan) Chiharu Shida	21	21
2	(China) Liu Shengshu (China) Tan Ning	9	17

Final
6	(Japan) Yuki Fukushima (Japan) Mayu Matsumoto	16	21	17
3	(Japan) Nami Matsuyama (Japan) Chiharu Shida	21	14	21

=== Top half ===
==== Section 1 ====
First round
1	(South Korea) Baek H-n (South Korea) Lee S-h	21	21
(India) P Konjengbam (India) S Mishra	9	4
(China) Jia YF (China) Zhang SX	21	21
(Scotland) J MacPherson (Scotland) C Torrance	12	6
7	(China) Li YJ (China) Luo XM	21	21
(Ukraine) P Buhrova (Ukraine) Y Kantemyr	16	15
(Chinese Taipei) Hsieh P-s (Chinese Taipei) Hung E-t	22	21
(India) T Crasto (India) A Ponnappa	20	18

Second round
1	(South Korea) Baek H-n (South Korea) Lee S-h	18	18
(China) Jia YF (China) Zhang SX	21	21
7	(China) Li YJ (China) Luo XM	21	21
(Chinese Taipei) Hsieh P-s (Chinese Taipei) Hung E-t	7	14

Quarter-finals
(China) Jia YF (China) Zhang SX	21	21
7	(China) Li YJ (China) Luo XM	11	12

==== Section 2 ====
First round
4	(Japan) R Iwanaga (Japan) K Nakanishi	17	21	21
(Hong Kong) Yeung N T (Hong Kong) Yeung P L	21	12	16
PFR	(United States) F Corbett (United States) J Gai	21	23
(Denmark) A C Kudsk (Denmark) S Schulz	15	21
6	(Japan) Y Fukushima (Japan) M Matsumoto	21	21
(Chinese Taipei) Hu L-f (Chinese Taipei) Jheng Y-c	15	13
(Indonesia) F D Kusuma (Indonesia) A C Pratiwi	21	21
(Thailand) L Kanlaha (Thailand) P Muenwong	7	9

Second round
4	(Japan) R Iwanaga (Japan) K Nakanishi	21	21
PFR	(United States) F Corbett (United States) J Gai	16	18
6	(Japan) Y Fukushima (Japan) M Matsumoto	21	19	21
(Indonesia) F D Kusuma (Indonesia) A C Pratiwi	12	21	16

Quarter-finals
4	(Japan) R Iwanaga (Japan) K Nakanishi	15	21	15
6	(Japan) Y Fukushima (Japan) M Matsumoto	21	10	21

=== Bottom half ===
==== Section 3 ====
First round
(Chinese Taipei) Hsu Y-h (Chinese Taipei) Lin J-y	21	20	19
(Indonesia) A Rahayu (Indonesia) S F S Ramadhanti	17	22	21
(Chinese Taipei) Teng C-h (Chinese Taipei) Yang C-y	21	15	13
5	(Malaysia) P Tan (Malaysia) Thinaah M	19	21	21
(Chinese Taipei) Chang C-h (Chinese Taipei) Yang C-t	14	11
(Bulgaria) G Stoeva (Bulgaria) S Stoeva	21	21
(Denmark) J Finne-Ipsen (Denmark) M Surrow	13	17
3	(Japan) N Matsuyama (Japan) C Shida	21	21

Second round
(Indonesia) A Rahayu (Indonesia) S F S Ramadhanti	16	14
5	(Malaysia) P Tan (Malaysia) Thinaah M	21	21
(Bulgaria) G Stoeva (Bulgaria) S Stoeva	14	19
3	(Japan) N Matsuyama (Japan) C Shida	21	21

Quarter-finals
5	(Malaysia) P Tan (Malaysia) Thinaah M	17	19
3	(Japan) N Matsuyama (Japan) C Shida	21	21

==== Section 4 ====
First round
(Chinese Taipei) Sung S-y (Chinese Taipei) Yu C-h	17	13
(India) T Jolly (India) G Gopichand	21	21
(South Korea) Jeong N-e (South Korea) Lee Y-w	22	16	19
8	(South Korea) Kim H-j (South Korea) Kong H-y	20	21	21
(Thailand) B Aimsaard (Thailand) N Aimsaard	21	21
(Poland) P Hankiewicz (Poland) K Marczak	16	15
(Canada) J Cheung (Canada) C Choi	18	11
2	(China) Liu SS (China) Tan N	21	21

Second round
(India) T Jolly (India) G Gopichand	15	21	21
8	(South Korea) Kim H-j (South Korea) Kong H-y	21	18	18
(Thailand) B Aimsaard (Thailand) N Aimsaard	6	19
2	(China) Liu SS (China) Tan N	21	21

Quarter-finals
(India) T Jolly (India) G Gopichand	14	10
2	(China) Liu SS (China) Tan N	21	21

== Mixed doubles ==
=== Seeds ===
1. (Malaysia) Goh Soon Huat / Shevon Jemie Lai (quarter-finals)
2. (Malaysia) Chen Tang Jie / Toh Ee Wei (first round)
3. (France) Thom Gicquel / Delphine Delrue (quarter-finals)
4. (Chinese Taipei) Yang Po-hsuan / Hu Ling-fang (second round)
5. (China) Jiang Zhenbang / Huang Dongping (semi-finals)
6. (China) Feng Yanzhe / Wei Yaxin (final)
7. (China) Guo Xinwa / Chen Fanghui (champions)
8. (Japan) Hiroki Midorikawa / Natsu Saito (first round)

=== Finals ===
Semi-finals
5	(China) Jiang Zhenbang (China) Huang Dongping	15	26	16
7	(China) Guo Xinwa (China) Chen Fanghui	21	24	21
(South Korea) Lee Jong-min (South Korea) Chae Yu-jung	14	18
5	(China) Feng Yanzhe (China) Wei Yaxin	21	21

Final
7	(China) Guo Xinwa (China) Chen Fanghui	21	10	23
5	(China) Feng Yanzhe (China) Wei Yaxin	16	21	21

=== Top half ===
==== Section 1 ====
First round
1	(Malaysia) Goh S H (Malaysia) S J Lai	22	9	21
(Thailand) D Puavaranukroh (Thailand) S Paewsampran	20	21	18
(Canada) T A Lindeman (Canada) J Wu	9	20
(Scotland) A Dunn (Scotland) J MacPherson	21	22
5	(China) Jiang ZB (China) Huang DP	21	21
(Singapore) T Hee (Singapore) Jin YJ	7	9
(Chinese Taipei) Lu M-c (Chinese Taipei) Hung E-t	13	22	21
(Denmark) R Espersen (Denmark) A C Kudsk	21	20	18

Second round
1	(Malaysia) Goh S H (Malaysia) S J Lai	21	21
(Scotland) A Dunn (Scotland) J MacPherson	9	10
5	(China) Jiang ZB (China) Huang DP	21	21
(Chinese Taipei) Lu M-c (Chinese Taipei) Hung E-t	13	17

Quarter-finals
1	(Malaysia) Goh S H (Malaysia) S J Lai	21	8	10
5	(China) Jiang ZB (China) Huang DP	18	21	21

==== Section 2 ====
First round
3	(France) T Gicquel (France) D Delrue	22	21
(China) Zhu YJ (China) Zhang C	20	15
(Chinese Taipei) Chen C-k (Chinese Taipei) Hsu Y-h	21	22
(Malaysia) Tan K M (Malaysia) Lai P J	18	20
7	(China) Guo XW (China) Chen FH	21	21
(India) S Karunakaran (India) A Variyath	6	15
(South Korea) Ki D-j (South Korea) Jeong N-e	21	21
(Malaysia) Hoo P R (Malaysia) Cheng S Y	17	18

Second round
3	(France) T Gicquel (France) D Delrue	19	21	21
(Chinese Taipei) Chen C-k (Chinese Taipei) Hsu Y-h	21	17	14
7	(China) Guo XW (China) Chen FH	21	21
(South Korea) Ki D-j (South Korea) Jeong N-e	12	14

Quarter-finals
3	(France) T Gicquel (France) D Delrue	21	10	17
7	(China) Guo XW (China) Chen FH	14	21	21

=== Bottom half ===
==== Section 3 ====
First round
(Thailand) R Oupthong (Thailand) J Sudjaipraparat	21	21
(India) D Kapila (India) T Crasto	17	14
(England) G Mairs (England) J Mairs	21	13	21
8	(Japan) H Midorikawa (Japan) N Saito	17	21	13
(South Korea) Lee J-m (South Korea) Chae Y-j	21	17	21
(Denmark) M Vestergaard (Denmark) C Busch	15	21	13
(England) C Hemming (England) Es van Leeuwen	21	12	19
4	(Chinese Taipei) Yang P-hs (Chinese Taipei) Hu L-f	17	21	21

Second round
(Thailand) R Oupthong (Thailand) J Sudjaipraparat	19	16
(England) G Mairs (England) J Mairs	21	21
(South Korea) Lee J-m (South Korea) Chae Y-j	21	21
4	(Chinese Taipei) Yang P-hs (Chinese Taipei) Hu L-f	17	13

Quarter-finals
(England) G Mairs (England) J Mairs	19	14
(South Korea) Lee J-m (South Korea) Chae Y-j	21	21

==== Section 4 ====
First round
(India) R Kapoor (India) R Gadde	21	17	24
(Chinese Taipei) Ye H-w (Chinese Taipei) N G Chan	10	21	22
(Thailand) P Teeraratsakul (Thailand) P Muenwong	14	14
5	(China) Feng YZ (China) Wei YX	21	21
(Denmark) J Toft (Denmark) A Magelund	21	21
(Malaysia) Wong T C (Malaysia) Lim C S	16	19
(Indonesia) R N Kusharjanto (Indonesia) G E Widjaja	18	22	21
2	(Malaysia) Chen T J (Malaysia) Toh E W	21	20	11

Second round
(India) R Kapoor (India) R Gadde	10	12
5	(China) Feng YZ (China) Wei YX	21	21
(Denmark) J Toft (Denmark) A Magelund	16	22	12
(Indonesia) R N Kusharjanto (Indonesia) G E Widjaja	21	20	21

Quarter-finals
5	(China) Feng YZ (China) Wei YX	21	21
(Indonesia) R N Kusharjanto (Indonesia) G E Widjaja	10	14

Preceded by 2025 Orléans Masters	BWF World Tour; 2025 BWF season	Succeeded by 2025 Swiss Open
