= Siti Fadia Silva Ramadhanti =

Indonesian badminton player (born 2000)

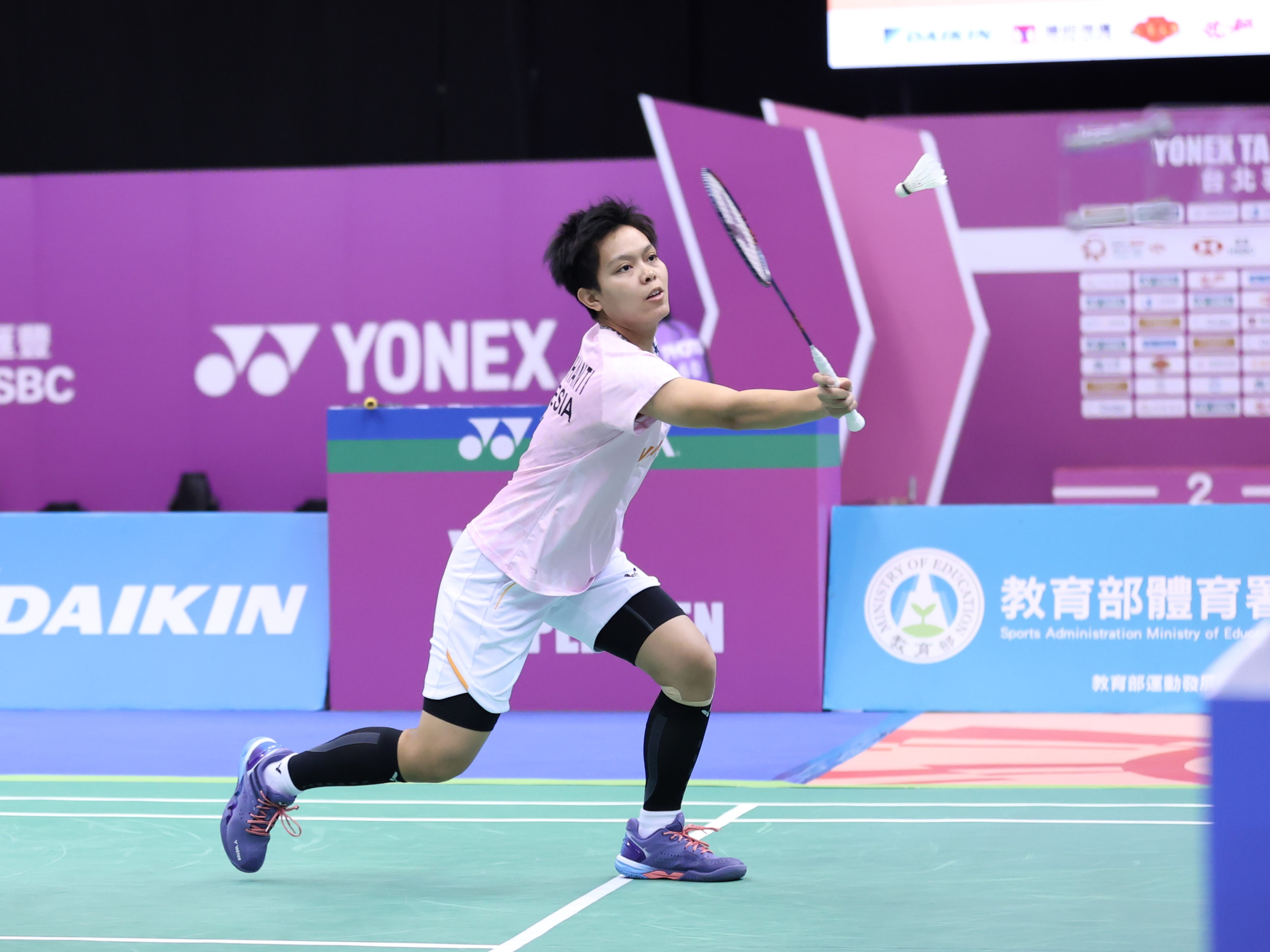
- Ramadhanti at the 2025 Taipei Open

Personal information
- Nickname: Fadia
- Born: 16 November 2000 (age 26) Bogor, West Java, Indonesia

Sport
- Country: Indonesia
- Sport: Badminton
- Handedness: Right

Women's & mixed doubles
- Highest ranking: 4 (WD with Apriyani Rahayu, 18 April 2023); 8 (WD with Amallia Cahaya Pratiwi, 3 November 2026); 14 (WD with Lanny Tria Mayasari, 5 August 2025); 26 (WD with Ribka Sugiarto, 9 November 2021); 28 (WD with Agatha Imanuela, 26 October 2018); 27 (XD with Dejan Ferdinansyah, 1 July 2025); 78 (XD with Rehan Naufal Kusharjanto, 27 September 2018)
- Current ranking: 8 (WD with Amallia Cahaya Pratiwi, 3 November 2026)
- BWF profile
Medal record
Women's badminton
Representing Indonesia
World Championships
Silver medal – second place	2023 Copenhagen	Women's doubles
Sudirman Cup
Bronze medal – third place	2025 Xiamen	Mixed team
Uber Cup
Silver medal – second place	2024 Chengdu	Women's team
Bronze medal – third place	2026 Horsens	Women's team
Asian Games
Bronze medal – third place	2026 Aichi–Nagoya	Women's team
Asian Championships
Bronze medal – third place	2026 Ningbo	Women's doubles
Asia Mixed Team Championships
Gold medal – first place	2025 Qingdao	Mixed team
Asia Team Championships
Bronze medal – third place	2026 Qingdao	Women's team
SEA Games
Gold medal – first place	2021 Vietnam	Women's doubles
Silver medal – second place	2019 Philippines	Women's team
Silver medal – second place	2021 Vietnam	Women's team
World Junior Championships
Silver medal – second place	2017 Yogyakarta	Mixed doubles
Silver medal – second place	2018 Markham	Mixed doubles
Bronze medal – third place	2018 Markham	Girls' doubles
Bronze medal – third place	2018 Markham	Mixed team
Asian Junior Championships
Gold medal – first place	2017 Jakarta	Mixed doubles
Silver medal – second place	2017 Jakarta	Mixed team
Bronze medal – third place	2017 Jakarta	Girls' doubles
Bronze medal – third place	2018 Jakarta	Girls' doubles
Bronze medal – third place	2018 Jakarta	Mixed team

Siti Fadia Silva Ramadhanti (born 16 November 2000) is an Indonesian badminton player affiliated with the Djarum club. She won the gold medal in the mixed doubles at the 2017 Asian Junior Championships, and in the women's doubles at the 2021 SEA Games. She also won the silver medal in the 2023 World Championships with Apriyani Rahayu.

== Career ==
Born in Kampung Bantar Jati, Klapanunggal, Jonggol, Bogor Regency, Ramadhanti grew up training in her father's badminton club before badminton legend Tri Kusharjanto noticed her talent and supported her in trying out for the Djarum badminton club. She joined the club in 2014 as a women's singles player, but was transferred to the doubles sector in 2015 to partner Agatha Imanuela in women's doubles and Rehan Naufal Kusharjanto in mixed doubles.

=== 2016–2018: Asian junior champions ===
In 2016, Ramadhanti won the Jakarta Open Junior International tournament in the U-17 girls' doubles event partnered with Agatha Imanuela. Ramadhanti made her BWF Superseries debut with Imanuela at the Indonesia Open. She joined the Badminton Asia U-17 Junior Championships in October and won the girls' doubles gold with Imanuela and mixed doubles bronze with Rehan Naufal Kusharjanto. In 2017, she reached the girls' doubles semi-finals at the German Junior, Thailand Junior, mixed doubles semi-finals at the India Junior Grand Prix, girls' doubles final at the Jaya Raya Junior Grand Prix, India Junior Grand Prix, and also mixed doubles final at the Malaysia Junior tournaments.

Ramadhanti was called up to the national team in 2017 after winning the 2017 National Championships with Kusharjanto. In August 2017, Ramadhanti won the mixed doubles gold, mixed team silver, and girls' doubles bronze at the Asian Junior Championships. Ramadhanti was selected to join the Indonesia national team for the 2017 World Junior Championships, where she and Kusharjanto became runners-up to compatriots Rinov Rivaldy and Pitha Haningtyas Mentari in three games. Later on, Ramadhanti reached the semi-finals of Indonesia International Series with Imanuela. She won her first senior international tournament at the Indonesia International Challenge in the mixed doubles event with Kusharjanto.

In 2018, Ramadhanti achieving success across multiple categories. In the mixed doubles, she continued her partnership with Kusharjanto, notably securing a silver medal at the 2018 World Junior Championships in Canada, after an all-Indonesian final against Leo Rolly Carnando and Indah Cahya Sari Jamil. Earlier that year, the duo also reached the quarter-finals of the Asian Junior Championships. In the girls' doubles, Ramadhanti primarily competed alongside Imanuella. Together, they reached the semi-finals of the Asian Junior Championships to earn a bronze medal and followed this with a silver medal at the World Junior Championships. Additionally, they transitioned into senior-level competition, reaching the quarter-finals in the Thailand Masters, and semi-finals of both the Finnish Open and the Hyderabad Open. Throughout the year, Ramadhanti was also a key contributor to the Indonesian junior squad, helping the team secure bronze medals at both the Asian and World Junior Mixed Team Championships.

=== 2019–2021: Partnership with Ribka Sugiarto, climbing up the senior team ranks ===
In the first half of the 2019 season, Ramadhanti's partnership with Imanuela did not show satisfactory results, with their best result were being a semi-finals in the Orléans Masters. She was then paired with Ribka Sugiarto, and made their debut as the quarter-finalists at the Russian Open in July. Not long after they were paired, Ramadhanti and Sugiarto won their first World Tour title at the Indonesia Masters Super 100. Some of their achievements were also being semi-finalists in the Chinese Taipei Open, where they beat second seed Lee So-hee and Shin Seung-chan; and also being quarter-finalists in the Macau Open. She took part in the 2019 SEA Games and obtained silver for Indonesia in the women's team event. In the individual event, Ramadhanti and Sugiarto lost at the quarter-finals to second seed Chow Mei Kuan and Lee Meng Yean.

In 2021, Ramadhanti competed at the 2021 Sudirman Cup in Vantaa, Finland. She played one match in the group stage against Russia. She continued her journey at the 2020 Uber Cup in Denmark, where she and Sugiarto won the second doubles tie against Thailand in the quarterfinals. During the European leg, her best finishes was the quarter-finals at the French Open and the semi-finals at the Hylo Open. After exiting the Indonesia Masters at the first round, Ramadhanti and Sugiarto were withdrawn from the Indonesia Open as Sugiarto was diagnosed with anterior cruciate ligament injury.

=== 2022: New partnership with Apriyani Rahayu, SEA Games gold ===
Following the announcement of Greysia Polii's impending retirement, Ramadhanti emerged as a primary candidate to partner with Apriyani Rahayu. Before the transition, Ramadhanti continued her partnership with Ribka Sugiarto, notably reaching the quarter-finals of the Badminton Asia Championships in March. Although the Ramadhanti-Rahayu duo was scheduled to debut at the Swiss Open, their start was delayed after Rahayu sustained a calf injury during the All England Open—the final tournament of her career with Polii. The Indonesian Badminton Federation (PBSI) officially confirmed the new partnership in May 2022. The pair enjoyed an immediate and decorated debut at the SEA Games, securing a silver medal in the team event and won the gold medal in the individual women's doubles after defeating Benyapa and Nuntakarn Aimsaard. This momentum continued as they secured titles at both the Malaysia and Singapore Opens, alongside a runner-up finish at the Indonesia Masters.

During this period, Ramadhanti made her final appearance with Sugiarto at the World Championships, concluding their partnership in the round of 32. Despite their rapid ascent in the rankings, the pair faced challenges later in the season, struggling to find form at the Denmark and French Opens. However, their cumulative performance throughout the year earned them a spot in the World Tour Finals, following the withdrawal of Nami Matsuyama and Chiharu Shida due to Matsuyama's injury. In their debut at the season-ending event, they finished third in group B after securing one victory and two losses. Nevertheless, their stellar debut year saw them skyrocket from being unranked as a pair in May to finishing the year in the top 15.

=== 2023: Early year struggle, World Championships debut ===
The first half of 2023 for Ramadhanti and her partner, Rahayu, was heavily defined by a recurring struggle with injuries. During the Malaysia Open semi-finals in January, Ramadhanti sustained an ankle injury in the second game, forcing the pair to retire against Chen Qingchen and Jia Yifan. A similar misfortune occurred at the Swiss Open semi-finals, where they withdrew during their match against Yuki Fukushima and Sayaka Hirota due to Rahayu's right shoulder injury. Despite these setbacks, their consistent semi-final appearances propelled them to world number 5. Throughout this period, Ramadhanti also reached the quarter-finals of several tournaments, including the Indonesia Masters, All England Open, Malaysia Masters, and the Indonesia Open. However, the pair suffered early exits at the Asian Championships and the Thailand and Singapore Opens. In team competitions, Ramadhanti represented Indonesia at the Asia Mixed Team Championships, where a quarter-final loss to Baek Ha-na and Lee So-hee led to Indonesia's elimination. During the Sudirman Cup group stage, she secured a victory over Jongkolphan Kititharakul and Rawinda Prajongjai; however, she did not feature in the quarter-finals as Indonesia was eliminated by China in a 0–3 sweep. In April 2023, the duo achieved a career milestone by reaching their highest world rank of number 4.

In August, Ramadhanti and Rahayu reached the finals of the World Championships in Copenhagen, becoming the first Indonesian women's doubles pair to do so in 28 years. The duo then won their first title of the year at the Hong Kong Open as the tournament's first ever women's doubles champion from Indonesia. At her Asian Games debut, Ramadhanti narrowly lost against Chen Qingchen and Jia Yifan at the team event, and the pair retired against Yuki Fukushima and Sayaka Hirota at the second round of the individual event due to Rahayu's calf injury. They withdrew from the Denmark Open to let Rahayu recuperate. The pair returned for the French Open, where they were stopped at the semi-finals by eventual champions Liu Shengshu and Tan Ning. Ramadhanti and Rahayu later managed to reach the finals of the Hylo Open. Despite winning the first game and leading at the second game interval against Zhang Shuxian and Zheng Yu, they were forced to retire Rahayu slipped and injured her right leg. Although they qualified for the World Tour Finals, the pair was eliminated during the group stage.

=== 2024: Olympic debut, partnership with Lanny Tria Mayasari ===
Ramadhanti was selected as a member of the Indonesian women's team at the Uber Cup in May, where the team made history by reaching the final at the Uber Cup since 2008. In the final Indonesia lost to China 0–3.

Ramadhanti and Rahayu's journey towards the 2024 Summer Olympics was plagued with multiple early exits, with their best finish being a semi-finalists at the Swiss Open. Placed in the 'group of death' with fierce rivals Pearly Tan and Thinaah Muralitharan, Chen Qingchen and Jia Yifan, and also Mayu Matsumoto and Wakana Nagahara, Ramadhanti's Olympic debut ended without winning a single game at the group stage.

As Rahayu was sidelined for recovery, Ramadhanti was paired with Lanny Tria Mayasari and struck gold in their partnership debut at the Indonesia International Challenge. Their first World Tour tournament was the Kumamoto Japan Masters, where they lost in the first round to Nami Matsuyama and Chiharu Shida. They retired from their next tournament, the China Masters, due to an injury on Mayasari's arm. At the end of the year, PBSI announced that Ramadhanti will be playing in both the women's and mixed doubles. She was paired with Dejan Ferdinansyah, who was called up to the national team after his performance with Gloria Emanuelle Widjaja under the Djarum badminton club.

=== 2025: Brief comeback to mixed doubles, new women's doubles partner ===
Ramadhanti started the 2025 year at the Malaysia Open. Although she and Mayasari managed to beat home favorites Tan and Muralitharan in the first round, they exited in the quarter-finals to old rival Jia Yifan's new partnership with Zhang Shuxian. The pair also lost to Yuki Fukushima and Mayu Matsumoto at the Indonesia Masters.

Ramadhanti's first appearance in the mixed doubles with Ferdinansyah was at the India Open, which ended in the second round against Jiang Zhenbang and Wei Yaxin. She reached both the mixed doubles and women's doubles finals of the Thailand Masters, becoming mixed doubles runner-up to Dechapol Puavaranukroh and Supissara Paewsampran and winning the women's doubles title with Mayasari over Laksika Kanlaha and Phataimas Muenwong. At the Asia Mixed Team Championships, Ramadhanti was fielded in both the women's and mixed doubles. As Ferdinansyah suffered a knee injury before the finals, she was paired with Rinov Rivaldy at the mixed doubles tie of the match and helped Indonesia achieve its first ever title in the tournament.

Ramadhanti briefly played again with Rahayu for the Orléans Masters and the All England Open. While they managed to reach the quarter-finals at Orléans, they fell short at the All England, losing in the second round to Tan and Muralitharan. She helped Indonesia secure its first bronze at the Sudirman Cup since 2019, winning the women's doubles tie against Thailand to advance the team to the semi-finals. At the semis, she and Ferdinansyah lost to world champions Seo Seung-jae and Chae Yoo-jung, but with Indonesia evening the score, Ramadhanti played the deciding tie with Amallia Cahaya Pratiwi. In a dramatic match lasting 91 minutes, the scratch pair narrowly lost to the more experienced Baek Ha-na and Lee So-hee. Later on, Ramadhanti reached her second mixed doubles final at the Taipei Open, where she lost to her juniors Jafar Hidayatullah and Felisha Pasaribu. Ramadhanti qualified for the 2025 World Championships with Mayasari in the women's doubles. They were unable to get a medal as they lost to Tan and Muralitharan in the third round. Her first title of the year came with Rahayu at the Indonesia Masters Super 100 in Medan.

=== 2026: Partnership with Amallia Pratiwi ===
In December 2025, PBSI officially announced Ramadhanti's new partnership with Amallia Cahaya Pratiwi. The duo commenced their journey with a quarter-finals finish at the Indonesia Masters. They snatched their first title as a pair at the Thailand Masters, which also marks Ramadhanti's second time winning the tournament. Making up for a subpar run at the European tournaments, Ramadhanti and Pratiwi secured Indonesia's first Asian Championships medal in women's doubles since Della Destiara Haris and Rizki Amelia Pradipta in 2019. In September, Ramadhanti made her second appearance at the Asian Games in Aichi–Nagoya. Entrusted as captain, she led the Indonesia squad to win the bronze medal in the women's tean event. However, in the individual event, she did not compete in the women's doubles but rather in the mixed doubles alongside Nikolaus Joaquin; the pair was eliminated in the early rounds.

== Achievements ==
=== World Championships ===
Women's doubles
Year	Venue	Partner	Opponent	Score	Result	Ref.
2023	Royal Arena, Copenhagen, Denmark	(Indonesia) Apriyani Rahayu	(China) Chen Qingchen (China) Jia Yifan	16–21, 12–21	Silver	

=== Asian Championships ===
Women's doubles
Year	Venue	Partner	Opponent	Score	Result	Ref.
2026	Ningbo Olympic Sports Center Gymnasium, Ningbo, China	(Indonesia) Amallia Cahaya Pratiwi	(China) Liu Shengshu (China) Tan Ning	10–21, 12–21	Bronze	

=== SEA Games ===
Women's doubles
Year	Venue	Partner	Opponent	Score	Result	Ref.
2021	Bac Giang Gymnasium, Bắc Giang, Vietnam	(Indonesia) Apriyani Rahayu	(Thailand) Benyapa Aimsaard (Thailand) Nuntakarn Aimsaard	21–17, 21–14	Gold	

=== World Junior Championships ===
Girls' doubles
Year	Venue	Partner	Opponent	Score	Result	Ref.
2018	Markham Pan Am Centre, Markham, Canada	(Indonesia) Agatha Imanuela	(China) Liu Xuanxuan (China) Xia Yuting	18–21, 13–21	Bronze	

Mixed doubles
Year	Venue	Partner	Opponent	Score	Result	Ref.
2017	GOR Among Rogo, Yogyakarta, Indonesia	(Indonesia) Rehan Naufal Kusharjanto	(Indonesia) Rinov Rivaldy (Indonesia) Pitha Haningtyas Mentari	23–21, 15–21, 18–21	Silver	
2018	Markham Pan Am Centre, Markham, Canada	(Indonesia) Rehan Naufal Kusharjanto	(Indonesia) Leo Rolly Carnando (Indonesia) Indah Cahya Sari Jamil	15–21, 9–21	Silver	

=== Asian Junior Championships ===
Girls' doubles
Year	Venue	Partner	Opponent	Score	Result	Ref.
2017	Jaya Raya Sports Hall Training Center, Jakarta, Indonesia	(Indonesia) Agatha Imanuela	(South Korea) Baek Ha-na (South Korea) Lee Yu-rim	18–21, 12–21	Bronze	
2018	Jaya Raya Sports Hall Training Center, Jakarta, Indonesia	(Indonesia) Agatha Imanuela	(Malaysia) Pearly Tan (Malaysia) Toh Ee Wei	15–21, 21–23	Bronze	

Mixed doubles
Year	Venue	Partner	Opponent	Score	Result	Ref.
2017	Jaya Raya Sports Hall Training Center, Jakarta, Indonesia	(Indonesia) Rehan Naufal Kusharjanto	(South Korea) Na Sung-seung (South Korea) Seong Ah-yeong	21–19, 19–21, 21–9	Gold	

=== BWF World Tour (8 titles, 5 runners-up) ===
The BWF World Tour, which was announced on 19 March 2017 and implemented in 2018, is a series of elite badminton tournaments sanctioned by the Badminton World Federation (BWF). The BWF World Tour is divided into levels of World Tour Finals, Super 1000, Super 750, Super 500, Super 300 (part of the HSBC World Tour), and the BWF Tour Super 100.

Women's doubles
Year	Tournament	Level	Partner	Opponent	Score	Result	Ref.
2019	Indonesia Masters	Super 100	(Indonesia) Ribka Sugiarto	(Indonesia) Della Destiara Haris (Indonesia) Rizki Amelia Pradipta	23–21, 21–15	(gold) Winner	
2022	Indonesia Masters	Super 500	(Indonesia) Apriyani Rahayu	(China) Chen Qingchen (China) Jia Yifan	18–21, 12–21	(silver) Runner-up	
2022	Malaysia Open	Super 750	(Indonesia) Apriyani Rahayu	(China) Zhang Shuxian (China) Zheng Yu	21–18, 12–21, 21–19	(gold) Winner	
2022	Singapore Open	Super 500	(Indonesia) Apriyani Rahayu	(China) Zhang Shuxian (China) Zheng Yu	21–14, 21–17	(gold) Winner	
2023	Hong Kong Open	Super 500	(Indonesia) Apriyani Rahayu	(Malaysia) Pearly Tan (Malaysia) Thinaah Muralitharan	14–21, 24–22, 21–9	(gold) Winner	
2023	Hylo Open	Super 300	(Indonesia) Apriyani Rahayu	(China) Zhang Shuxian (China) Zheng Yu	21–18, 1^{r}–1	(silver) Runner-up	
2024 (II)	Indonesia Masters	Super 100	(Indonesia) Lanny Tria Mayasari	(Chinese Taipei) Hsieh Pei-shan (Chinese Taipei) Hung En-tzu	19–21, 15–21	(silver) Runner-up	
2025	Thailand Masters	Super 300	(Indonesia) Lanny Tria Mayasari	(Thailand) Laksika Kanlaha (Thailand) Phataimas Muenwong	15–21, 21–13, 21–8	(gold) Winner	
2025 (II)	Indonesia Masters	Super 100	(Indonesia) Apriyani Rahayu	(Indonesia) Isyana Syahira Meida (Indonesia) Rinjani Kwinnara Nastine	21–11, 21–17	(gold) Winner	
2026	Thailand Masters	Super 300	(Indonesia) Amallia Cahaya Pratiwi	(China) Bao Lijing (China) Li Yijing	15–21, 21–15, 21–18	(gold) Winner	
2026	Hylo Open	Super 500	(Indonesia) Amallia Cahaya Pratiwi	(Chinese Taipei) Hsu Yin-hui (Chinese Taipei) Lin Jhih-yun	21–18, 21–19	(gold) Winner	

Mixed doubles
Year	Tournament	Level	Partner	Opponent	Score	Result	Ref.
2025	Thailand Masters	Super 300	(Indonesia) Dejan Ferdinansyah	(Thailand) Dechapol Puavaranukroh (Thailand) Supissara Paewsampran	21–19, 17–21, 13–21	(silver) Runner-up	
2025	Taipei Open	Super 300	(Indonesia) Dejan Ferdinansyah	(Indonesia) Jafar Hidayatullah (Indonesia) Felisha Pasaribu	21–18, 13–21, 17–21	(silver) Runner-up	

=== BWF International Challenge/Series (2 titles, 1 runner-up) ===
Women's doubles
Year	Tournament	Partner	Opponent	Score	Result	Ref.
2017	Indonesia International	(Indonesia) Agatha Imanuela	(Indonesia) Febriana Dwipuji Kusuma (Indonesia) Tiara Rosalia Nuraidah	19–21, 18–21	(silver) Runner-up	
2024 (II)	Indonesia International	(Indonesia) Lanny Tria Mayasari	(Chinese Taipei) Hsieh Pei-shan (Chinese Taipei) Hung En-tzu	21–9, 21–16	(gold) Winner	

Mixed doubles
Year	Tournament	Partner	Opponent	Score	Result	Ref.
2017	Indonesia International	(Indonesia) Rehan Naufal Kusharjanto	(Indonesia) Irfan Fadhilah (Indonesia) Pia Zebadiah Bernadet	21–9, 21–18	(gold) Winner	

BWF International Challenge tournament
BWF International Series tournament

=== BWF Junior International (4 runners-up) ===
Women's doubles
Year	Tournament	Partner	Opponent	Score	Result	Ref.
2017	Jaya Raya Junior International	(Indonesia) Agatha Imanuela	(South Korea) Baek Ha-na (South Korea) Lee Yu-rim	18–21, 21–16, 16–21	(silver) Runner-up	
2017	India Junior International	(Indonesia) Agatha Imanuela	(South Korea) Kim Min-ji (South Korea) Seong Ah-yeong	15–21, 19–21	(silver) Runner-up	

Mixed doubles
Year	Tournament	Partner	Opponent	Score	Result	Ref.
2017	Malaysia International Junior Open	(Indonesia) Rehan Naufal Kusharjanto	(Indonesia) Yeremia Rambitan (Indonesia) Angelica Wiratama	11–21, 16–21	(silver) Runner-up	
2018	Malaysia International Junior Open	(Indonesia) Rehan Naufal Kusharjanto	(Indonesia) Ghifari Anandaffa Prihardika (Indonesia) Lisa Ayu Kusumawati	19–21, 21–14, 16–21	(silver) Runner-up	

BWF Junior International Grand Prix tournament
BWF Junior International Challenge tournament
BWF Junior International Series tournament
BWF Junior Future Series tournament

== Performance timeline ==
Key

W	Won	F	Finalist	SF	Semi-finalist
QF	Quarter-finalist	#R	Rounds 4, 3, 2, 1	RR	Round-robin stage
Q#	Qualification round	A	Absent	w/d	Withdrew
G	Gold	S	Silver	B	Bronze
NH	Not held	N/A	Not applicable	DNQ	Did not qualify

=== National team ===
- Junior level

Team events	2017	2018	Ref
Asian Junior Championships	S	B	
World Junior Championships	QF	B	

- Senior level

Team events	2019	2020	2021	2022	2023	2024	2025	2026	Ref
SEA Games	S	NH	S	NH	A	NH	A	NH	
Asia Team Championships	NH	QF	NH	A	NH	A	NH	B	
Asia Mixed Team Championships	A	NH			QF	NH	G	NH	
Asian Games	NH			QF	NH			B	
Uber Cup	NH	QF	NH	A	NH	S	NH	B	
Sudirman Cup	A	NH	QF	NH	QF	NH	B	NH	

=== Individual competitions ===
==== Junior level ====
Girls' doubles

Events	2017	2018	Ref
Asian Junior Championships	B	B	
World Junior Championships	4R	B	

Mixed doubles

Events	2017	2018	Ref
Asian Junior Championships	G	QF	
World Junior Championships	S	S	

==== Senior level ====
===== Women's doubles =====
Events	2018	2019	2020	2021	2022	2023	2024	2025	2026	Ref
SEA Games	NH	QF	NH	G	NH	A	NH	A	NH	
Asian Championships	A	1R	NH		QF	1R	w/d	1R	B	
Asian Games	A	NH			2R	NH			A	
World Championships	1R	DNQ	NH	w/d	2R	S	NH	3R	DNQ	
Olympic Games	NH		DNQ	NH			RR	NH		

Tournament	BWF Superseries / Grand Prix		BWF World Tour									Best	Ref
Tournament	2016	2017	2018	2019	2020	2021	2022	2023	2024	2025	2026	Best	Ref
Malaysia Open	A			1R	NH		W	SF	w/d	QF	A	W ('22)	
India Open	A				NH		A		w/d	A		—	
Indonesia Masters	A		2R	1R	1R	1R	F	QF	1R	1R	QF	F ('22)	
Thailand Masters	A		QF	1R	A	NH		A		W	W	W ('25, '26)	
German Open	A				NH		A				SF	SF ('26)	
All England Open	A				2R	A		QF	2R	2R	2R	QF ('23)	
Swiss Open	A			2R	NH	A	w/d	SF	SF	w/d	2R	SF ('23, '24)	
Orléans Masters	N/A		2R	SF	NH	w/d	w/d	A		QF	A	SF ('19)	
Thailand Open	A			1R	1R	NH	A	2R	A	2R	A	2R ('23, '25)	
Thailand Open	A			1R	1R	NH	A	2R	A	2R	A	2R ('23, '25)	
Malaysia Masters	A			1R	1R	NH	QF	QF	A	QF	A	QF ('22, '23, '25)	
Singapore Open	A				NH		W	2R	QF	A	1R	W ('22)	
Indonesia Open	1R	1R	2R	A	NH	w/d	QF	QF	2R	2R	QF	QF ('22' 23, '26)	
Australian Open	A			1R	NH		A	2R	A	QF	A	QF ('25)	
Macau Open	A			QF	NH				A		SF	SF ('26)	
Japan Open	A				NH		QF	1R	A	QF	1R	QF ('22, '25)	
China Open	A				NH			QF	A	w/d	1R	QF ('23)	
Taipei Open	A		QF	SF	NH		w/d	A			w/d	SF ('19)	
China Masters	A				NH			2R	1R	A		2R ('23)	
Indonesia Masters Super 100	NH		QF	W	NH		A	A				W ('19, '25 II)	
Indonesia Masters Super 100	NH		QF	W	NH		A	A	F	W	A	W ('19, '25 II)	
Vietnam Open	A		QF	1R	NH		A					QF ('18)	
Denmark Open	A					1R	QF	w/d	A		1R	QF ('22)	
French Open	A				NH	QF	1R	SF	2R	A	QF	SF ('23)	
Hylo Open	A					SF	A	F	A		W	W ('26)	
Korea Open	A				NH		A			2R	A	2R ('25)	
Japan Masters	NH							A	1R	2R	QF	QF ('26)	
Hong Kong Open	A			1R	NH			W	A	2R	SF	W ('23)	
Syed Modi International	A				NH		A			w/d	A	—	
Superseries / World Tour Finals	DNQ						RR	RR	DNQ		Q	RR ('22, '23)	
Hyderabad Open	NH		SF	2R	NH							SF ('18)	
New Zealand Open	A			1R	NH							1R ('19)	
Russian Open	A			QF	NH							QF ('19)	
Spain Masters	NH		A				NH	w/d	A	NH		—	
Year-end ranking	184	127	34	53	32	28	11	6	30	17		4	
Tournament	2016	2017	2018	2019	2020	2021	2022	2023	2024	2025	2026	Best	Ref

===== Mixed doubles =====
Event	2025	2026	Ref
Asian Championships	1R	A	
Asian Games	NH	2R	

Tournament	BWF World Tour								Best	Ref
Tournament	2018	2019	2020	2021	2022	2023	2024	2025	Best	Ref
India Open	A		NH		A			2R	2R ('25)	
Indonesia Masters	A	1R	A					1R	1R ('19, '25)	
Thailand Masters	2R	1R	A	NH		A		F	F ('25)	
Orléans Masters	2R	A	NH	A					2R ('18)	
Swiss Open	A		NH	A				1R	1R ('25)	
Taipei Open	2R	A	NH		A			F	F ('25)	
Thailand Open	A			NH	A			1R	1R ('25)	
Malaysia Masters	A			NH	A			QF	QF ('25)	
Indonesia Open	A		NH	A				1R	1R ('25)	
Vietnam Open	2R	A	NH		A				2R ('18)	
Indonesia Masters Super 100	2R	A	NH		A				2R ('18)	
Hyderabad Open	2R	A	NH						2R ('18)	
Year-end ranking	102	258	—	—	—	—	—	31	27	
Tournament	2018	2019	2020	2021	2022	2023	2024	2025	Best	Ref

== Record against selected opponents ==
Record against year-end Finals finalists, World Championships semi-finalists, and Olympic quarter-finalists. Accurate as of 10 October 2023.

=== Apriyani Rahayu ===
Players	M	W	L	Diff.
(China) Chen Qingchen & Jia Yifan	7	1	6	–5 (Note: Tournament software did not included the women's team event of the 2022 Asian Games results for head-to-head.)
(China) Zhang Shuxian & Zheng Yu	4	3	1	+2
(Japan) Yuki Fukushima & Sayaka Hirota	4	1	3	–2
(Japan) Mayu Matsumoto & Wakana Nagahara	1	1	0	+1
(Japan) Nami Matsuyama & Chiharu Shida	3	1	2	–1
(South Korea) Kim So-yeong & Kong Hee-yong	2	2	0	+2
(South Korea) Lee So-hee & Shin Seung-chan	2	1	1	0
(Thailand) Benyapa Aimsaard & Nuntakarn Aimsaard	3	1	2	–1
