= 2023 Swiss Open (badminton) =

Badminton tournament in Basel

Tournament details
- Dates: 21–26 March
- Level: Super 300
- Total prize money: US$210,000
- Venue: St. Jakobshalle
- Location: Basel, Switzerland

Champions
- Men's singles: (Japan) Koki Watanabe
- Women's singles: (Thailand) Pornpawee Chochuwong
- Men's doubles: (India) Satwiksairaj Rankireddy (India) Chirag Shetty
- Women's doubles: (Japan) Rena Miyaura (Japan) Ayako Sakuramoto
- Mixed doubles: (China) Jiang Zhenbang (China) Wei Yaxin

The 2023 Swiss Open (officially known as Yonex Swiss Open 2023 for sponsorship reasons) was a badminton tournament which took place in St. Jakobshalle at Basel, Switzerland from 21 to 26 March 2023, with a total prize of $210,000.

== Tournament ==
The 2023 Swiss Open was the eighth tournament of the 2023 BWF World Tour and was part of the Swiss Open championships which had been held since 1955. It was organized by the Swiss Badminton with sanction from the Badminton World Federation.

=== Venue ===
This tournament was held at St. Jakobshalle in Basel, Switzerland.

=== Point distribution ===
Below is the point distribution table for each phase of the tournament based on the BWF point system for the BWF World Tour Super 300 event.

Winner	Runner-up	3/4	5/8	9/16	17/32
7,000	5,950	4,900	3,850	2,750	1,670

=== Prize pool ===
The total prize money was US$210,000 with the distribution of the prize money in accordance with BWF regulations.

Event	Winner	Finalist	Semi-finals	Quarter-finals	Last 16
Singles	$15,750	$7,980	$3,045	$1,260	$735
Doubles	$16,590	$7,980	$2,940	$1,522.50	$787.50

== Men's singles ==
=== Seeds ===
1. (Denmark) Viktor Axelsen (semi-finals)
2. (Malaysia) Lee Zii Jia (semi-finals)
3. (Chinese Taipei) Chou Tien-chen (final)
4. (Thailand) Kunlavut Vitidsarn (withdrew)
5. (India) Prannoy H. S. (second round)
6. (China) Lu Guangzu (withdrew)
7. (China) Zhao Junpeng (first round)
8. (India) Lakshya Sen (first round)

=== Wildcard ===
Swiss Badminton awarded a wild card entry to Tobias Künzi of Switzerland.

=== Finals ===
Semi-finals
1	(Denmark) Viktor Axelsen	10	15
3	(Chinese Taipei) Chou Tien-chen	21	21
PFQ	(Japan) Koki Watanabe	21	21
2	(Malaysia) Lee Zii Jia	11	14

Final
3	(Chinese Taipei) Chou Tien-chen	20	21	12
PFQ	(Japan) Koki Watanabe	22	18	21

=== Top half ===
==== Section 1 ====
First round
1	(Denmark) V Axelsen	5
(Indonesia) C A Dwi Wardoyo	1^{r}
(Chinese Taipei) Lin C-y	17	21	21
(Canada) B Yang	21	17	17
5	(India) Prannoy H. S.	21	19	21
(China) Shi YQ	17	21	17
PFQ	(India) K George	14	15
PFQ	(France) C Popov	21	21

Second round
1	(Denmark) V Axelsen	21	21
(Chinese Taipei) Lin C-y	11	7
5	(India) Prannoy H. S.	8	8
PFQ	(France) C Popov	21	21

Quarter-finals
1	(Denmark) V Axelsen	21	21
PFQ	(France) C Popov	12	17

==== Section 2 ====
First round
3	(Chinese Taipei) Chou T-c	22	21
(Chinese Taipei) Wang T-w	20	16
WC	(Switzerland) T Künzi	12	23
Q2	(Chinese Taipei) Chi Y-j	21	25
PFQ	(Malaysia) Cheam J W	21	21
(Malaysia) Liew D	14	13
(Malaysia) Ng T Y	23	21	13
Q1	(Malaysia) Soong J V	25	17	4^{r}

Second round
3	(Chinese Taipei) Chou T-c	23	21	21
Q2	(Chinese Taipei) Chi Y-j	25	18	9
PFQ	(Malaysia) Cheam J W	12	17
(Malaysia) Ng T Y	21	21

Quarter-finals
3	(Chinese Taipei) Chou T-c	21	2
(Malaysia) Ng T Y	11	0^{r}

=== Bottom half ===
==== Section 3 ====
First round
(China) Weng HY	16	21	18
(India) S Kidambi	21	15	21
(Hong Kong) Lee C Y	21	21
8	(India) L Sen	18	11
(Denmark) H-K Vittinghus	19	16
(France) T J Popov	21	21
(Thailand) S Thammasin	8	9
PFQ	(Japan) K Watanabe	21	21

Second round
(India) S Kidambi	20	17
(Hong Kong) Lee C Y	22	21
(France) T J Popov	11	24	5
PFQ	(Japan) K Watanabe	21	22	21

Quarter-finals
(Hong Kong) Lee C Y	12	15
PFQ	(Japan) K Watanabe	21	21

==== Section 4 ====
First round
Q3	(Netherlands) J Kweekel	8	17
PFQ	(India) M Manjunath	21	21
Q4	(Chinese Taipei) Lee C-h	21	21
7	(China) Zhao JP	12	13
(Indonesia) S H Rhustavito	19	17
(Republic of Ireland) N Nguyen	21	21
(China) Li SF	21	18	21
2	(Malaysia) Lee Z J	18	21	23

Second round
PFQ	(India) M Manjunath	19	10
Q4	(Chinese Taipei) Lee C-h	21	21
(Republic of Ireland) N Nguyen	19	15
2	(Malaysia) Lee Z J	21	21

Quarter-finals
Q4	(Chinese Taipei) Lee C-h	12	17
2	(Malaysia) Lee Z J	21	21

== Women's singles ==
=== Seeds ===
1. (China) Wang Zhiyi (first round)
2. (Spain) Carolina Marín (withdrew)
3. (Thailand) Ratchanok Intanon (first round)
4. (India) P. V. Sindhu (second round)
5. (China) Han Yue (second round)
6. (Thailand) Pornpawee Chochuwong (champion)
7. (Thailand) Busanan Ongbumrungphan (withdrew)
8. (Japan) Nozomi Okuhara (second round)

=== Wildcard ===
Swiss Badminton awarded a wild card entry to Jenjira Stadelmann of Switzerland.

=== Finals ===
Semi-finals
(Denmark) Mia Blichfeldt	19	21	21
(United States) Beiwen Zhang	21	19	18
6	(Thailand) Pornpawee Chochuwong	18	21	21
(Indonesia) Gregoria Mariska Tunjung	21	13	17

Final
(Denmark) Mia Blichfeldt	16	18
6	(Thailand) Pornpawee Chochuwong	21	21

=== Top half ===
==== Section 1 ====
First round
1	(China) Wang ZY	21	18	10
(China) Zhang YM	7	21	21
(Denmark) L Christophersen	15	21
(Denmark) M Blichfeldt	21	23
5	(China) Han Y	21	21
(Chinese Taipei) Hsu W-c	18	16
(South Korea) Kim G-e	21	21
Q3	(India) M Bansod	14	15

Second round
(China) Zhang YM	14	16
(Denmark) M Blichfeldt	21	21
5	(China) Han Y	18	13
(South Korea) Kim G-e	21	21

Quarter-finals
(Denmark) M Blichfeldt	17	21	21
(South Korea) Kim G-e	21	19	18

==== Section 2 ====
First round
3	(Thailand) R Intanon	15	0^{r}
(Japan) R Gunji	21	0
(United States) BW Zhang	21	23
(Japan) N Nidaira	16	21
8	(Japan) N Okuhara	21	23
Q2	(France) Qi XF	19	21
(Belgium) L Tan	11	9
(Chinese Taipei) Pai Y-p	21	21

Second round
(Japan) R Gunji	14	11
(United States) BW Zhang	21	21
8	(Japan) N Okuhara
(Chinese Taipei) Pai Y-p	w	/	o

Quarter-finals
(United States) BW Zhang	21	21
(Chinese Taipei) Pai Y-p	15	13

=== Bottom half ===
==== Section 3 ====
First round
(Malaysia) Goh J W	12	21	21
(Denmark) L Kjærsfeldt	21	17	13
Q1	(Myanmar) Thet Htar T	21	11	6
6	(Thailand) P Chochuwong	19	21	21
(Thailand) L Chaiwan	13	13
PFQ	(Indonesia) P K Wardani	21	21
WC	(Switzerland) J Stadelmann	9	16
4	(India) P. V. Sindhu	21	21

Second round
(Malaysia) Goh J W	4^{r}
6	(Thailand) P Chochuwong	13
PFQ	(Indonesia) P K Wardani	21	12	21
4	(India) P. V. Sindhu	15	21	18

Quarter-finals
6	(Thailand) P Chochuwong	21	21
PFQ	(Indonesia) P K Wardani	12	14

==== Section 4 ====
First round
Q4	(Malaysia) Kisona S	9	16
(Scotland) K Gilmour	21	21
(Germany) Y Li	21	21
PFQ	(India) A Kashyap	15	17
(Canada) M Li	21	11	21
(Chinese Taipei) Sung S-y	15	21	17
(Indonesia) G M Tunjung	21	21
PFQ	(Spain) C Azurmendi	13	12

Second round
(Scotland) K Gilmour	21	21
(Germany) Y Li	17	17
(Canada) M Li	21	16	16
(Indonesia) G M Tunjung	17	21	21

Quarter-finals
(Scotland) K Gilmour	10	19
(Indonesia) G M Tunjung	21	21

== Men's doubles ==
=== Seeds ===
1. (Malaysia) Aaron Chia / Soh Wooi Yik (second round)
2. (India) Satwiksairaj Rankireddy / Chirag Shetty (champions)
3. (Malaysia) Ong Yew Sin / Teo Ee Yi (semi-finals)
4. (China) Liang Weikeng / Wang Chang (withdrew)
5. (Indonesia) Leo Rolly Carnando / Daniel Marthin (first round)
6. (Indonesia) Muhammad Shohibul Fikri / Bagas Maulana (quarter-finals)
7. (Chinese Taipei) Lu Ching-yao / Yang Po-han (second round)
8. (Germany) Mark Lamsfuß / Marvin Seidel (first round)

=== Wildcard ===
Swiss Badminton awarded a wild card entry to Arthur Boudier and Minh Quang Pham of Switzerland.

=== Finals ===
Semi-finals
(China) Ren Xiangyu (China) Tan Qiang	21	21
(England) Ben Lane (England) Sean Vendy	10	17
3	(Malaysia) Ong Yew Sin (Malaysia) Teo Ee Yi	19	21	17
2	(India) Satwiksairaj Rankireddy (India) Chirag Shetty	21	17	21

Final
(China) Ren Xiangyu (China) Tan Qiang	19	22
2	(India) Satwiksairaj Rankireddy (India) Chirag Shetty	21	24

=== Top half ===
==== Section 1 ====
First round
1	(Malaysia) A Chia (Malaysia) Soh W Y	21	21
WC	(Switzerland) A Boudier (Switzerland) M Q Pham	10	10
(Japan) A Koga (Japan) T Saito	17	21	21
(India) Arjun M. R. (India) D Kapila	21	18	11
7	(Chinese Taipei) Lu C-y (Chinese Taipei) Yang P-ha	21	21
(Thailand) C Charoenkitamorn (Thailand) N Yordphaisong	8	12
Q2	(Japan) S Mezaki (Japan) H Nishida	15	17
(China) Ren XY (China) Tan Q	21	21

Second round
1	(Malaysia) A Chia (Malaysia) Soh W Y	21	16	17
(Japan) A Koga (Japan) T Saito	17	21	21
7	(Chinese Taipei) Lu C-y (Chinese Taipei) Yang P-ha	15	17
(China) Ren XY (China) Tan Q	21	21

Quarter-finals
(Japan) A Koga (Japan) T Saito	10	18
(China) Ren XY (China) Tan Q	21	21

==== Section 2 ====
First round
PFQ	(Chinese Taipei) Chiu H-c (Chinese Taipei) Yang M-t	21	18	21
(Chinese Taipei) Su C-h (Chinese Taipei) Ye H-w	17	21	15
(France) L Corvée (France) R Labar	17	21	13
(Japan) A Endo (Japan) Y Takei	21	15	21
8	(Germany) M Lamsfuß (Germany) M Seidel	11	17
(China) He JT (China) Zhou HD	21	21
(France) C Popov (France) T J Popov	17	7
(England) B Lane (England) S Vendy	21	21

Second round
PFQ	(Chinese Taipei) Chiu H-c (Chinese Taipei) Yang M-t	20	19
(Japan) A Endo (Japan) Y Takei	22	21
(China) He JT (China) Zhou HD	19	21	17
(England) B Lane (England) S Vendy	21	15	21

Quarter-finals
(Japan) A Endo (Japan) Y Takei	23	18	17
(England) B Lane (England) S Vendy	21	21	21

=== Bottom half ===
==== Section 3 ====
First round
(Malaysia) Tan K M (Malaysia) Tan W K	12	21	11
(Chinese Taipei) Lee J-h (Chinese Taipei) Yang P-hs	21	15	21
(India) K P Garaga (India) V G Panjala	16	14
6	(Indonesia) M S Fikri (Indonesia) B Maulana	21	21
Q4	(Japan) K Mitsuhashi (Japan) H Okamura	26	15	21
(Indonesia) P Kusumawardana (Indonesia) Y Rambitan	24	21	17
(Scotland) A Dunn (Scotland) A Hall	20	13
3	(Malaysia) Ong Y S (Malaysia) Teo E Y	22	21

Second round
(Chinese Taipei) Lee J-h (Chinese Taipei) Yang P-hs	8	21	16
6	(Indonesia) M S Fikri (Indonesia) B Maulana	21	15	21
Q4	(Japan) K Mitsuhashi (Japan) H Okamura	21	13	15
3	(Malaysia) Ong Y S (Malaysia) Teo E Y	15	21	21

Quarter-finals
6	(Indonesia) M S Fikri (Indonesia) B Maulana	21	12	19
3	(Malaysia) Ong Y S (Malaysia) Teo E Y	16	21	21

==== Section 4 ====
First round
(Denmark) R Kjær (Denmark) F Søgaard	21	13^{r}
Q1	(Algeria) K Mammeri (Algeria) Y S Medel	16	6
(Denmark) J Bay (Denmark) L Mølhede	22	24
5	(Indonesia) L R Carnando (Indonesia) D Marthin	20	22
PFQ	(Chinese Taipei) Lee F-c (Chinese Taipei) Lee F-j	21	21
(Thailand) S Jomkoh (Thailand) K Kedren	17	19
Q3	(Malaysia) Boon X Y (Malaysia) Wong T C	15	18
2	(India) S Rankireddy (India) C Shetty	21	21

Second round
Q1	(Algeria) K Mammeri (Algeria) Y S Medel	13	24
(Denmark) J Bay (Denmark) L Mølhede	21	26
PFQ	(Chinese Taipei) Lee F-c (Chinese Taipei) Lee F-j	21	17	26
2	(India) S Rankireddy (India) C Shetty	12	21	28

Quarter-finals
(Denmark) J Bay (Denmark) L Mølhede	21	11	14
2	(India) S Rankireddy (India) C Shetty	15	21	21

== Women's doubles ==
=== Seeds ===
1. (China) Zhang Shuxian / Zheng Yu (quarter-finals)
2. (Indonesia) Apriyani Rahayu / Siti Fadia Silva Ramadhanti (semi-finals)
3. (Malaysia) Pearly Tan / Thinaah Muralitharan (first round)
4. (Thailand) Jongkolphan Kititharakul / Rawinda Prajongjai (second round)
5. (South Korea) Baek Ha-na / Lee So-hee (semi-finals)
6. (Japan) Yuki Fukushima / Sayaka Hirota (final)
7. (Thailand) Benyapa Aimsaard / Nuntakarn Aimsaard (first round)
8. (Bulgaria) Gabriela Stoeva / Stefani Stoeva (first round)

=== Wildcard ===
Swiss Badminton awarded a wild card entry to Aline Müller and Caroline Racloz of Switzerland.

=== Finals ===
Semi-finals
(Japan) Rena Miyaura (Japan) Ayako Sakuramoto	21	21
5	(South Korea) Baek Ha-na (South Korea) Lee So-hee	17	19
6	(Japan) Yuki Fukushima (Japan) Sayaka Hirota	21	16
2	(Indonesia) Apriyani Rahayu (Indonesia) Siti Fadia Silva Ramadhanti	17	10^{r}

Final
(Japan) Rena Miyaura (Japan) Ayako Sakuramoto	w	/	o
6	(Japan) Yuki Fukushima (Japan) Sayaka Hirota

=== Top half ===
==== Section 1 ====
First round
1	(China) Zhang SX (China) Zheng Y	15	21	21
(Chinese Taipei) Hsu Y-c (Chinese Taipei) Lin W-c	21	15	16
WC	(Switzerland) A Müller (Switzerland) C Racloz	17	8
(Chinese Taipei) Chang C-h (Chinese Taipei) Yang C-t	21	21
8	(Bulgaria) G Stoeva (Bulgaria) S Stoeva	12	10
(Japan) R Miyaura (Japan) A Sakuramoto	21	21
(Indonesia) F D Kusuma (Indonesia) A C Pratiwi	19	21	21
(Indonesia) L T Mayasari (Indonesia) R Sugiarto	21	13	14

Second round
1	(China) Zhang SX (China) Zheng Y	21	21
(Chinese Taipei) Chang C-h (Chinese Taipei) Yang C-t	19	10
(Japan) R Miyaura (Japan) A Sakuramoto	20	22	21
(Indonesia) F D Kusuma (Indonesia) A C Pratiwi	22	20	17

Quarter-finals
1	(China) Zhang SX (China) Zheng Y	6	14
(Japan) R Miyaura (Japan) A Sakuramoto	21	21

==== Section 2 ====
First round
3	(Malaysia) P Tan (Malaysia) Thinaah M	15	21	16
(Chinese Taipei) Lee C-h (Chinese Taipei) Teng C-h	21	14	21
(Chinese Taipei) Hu L-f (Chinese Taipei) Lin X-m	21	15	21
(Germany) S Küspert (Germany) E Moszczynski	15	21	14
5	(South Korea) Baek H-n (South Korea) Lee S-h	21	21
(Denmark) M Fruergaard (Denmark) S Thygesen	11	19
(Malaysia) V Hoo (Malaysia) Lim C S	21	21
PFQ	(United States) A Xu (United States) K Xu	18	18

Second round
(Chinese Taipei) Lee C-h (Chinese Taipei) Teng C-h	12	21	21
(Chinese Taipei) Hu L-f (Chinese Taipei) Lin X-m	21	13	14
5	(South Korea) Baek H-n (South Korea) Lee S-h	13	21	21
(Malaysia) V Hoo (Malaysia) Lim C S	21	16	12

Quarter-finals
(Chinese Taipei) Lee C-h (Chinese Taipei) Teng C-h	17	17
5	(South Korea) Baek H-n (South Korea) Lee S-h	21	21

=== Bottom half ===
==== Section 3 ====
First round
Q3	(Japan) S Hobara (Japan) Y Suizu	21	21
Q2	(India) N S Reddy (India) A S Sunil	12	14
Q4	(China) Du Y (China) Xia YT	19	22	14
6	(Japan) Y Fukushima (Japan) S Hirota	21	20	21
(England) C Birch (England) L Smith	17	21	21
(Germany) L Efler (Germany) I Lohau	21	8	18
PFQ	(United States) F Corbett (United States) A Lee	12	13
4	(Thailand) J Kititharakul (Thailand) R Prajongjai	21	21

Second round
Q3	(Japan) S Hobara (Japan) Y Suizu	13	6
6	(Japan) Y Fukushima (Japan) S Hirota	21	21
(England) C Birch (England) L Smith	18
4	(Thailand) J Kititharakul (Thailand) R Prajongjai	14^{r}

Quarter-finals
6	(Japan) Y Fukushima (Japan) S Hirota	21	21
(England) C Birch (England) L Smith	12	8

==== Section 4 ====
First round
(China) Li WM (China) Liu XX	21	21
(Ukraine) M Stoliarenko (Ukraine) Y Zharka	12	11
Q1	(China) Li YJ (China) Luo XM	21	17	21
7	(Thailand) B Aimsaard (Thailand) N Aimsaard	19	21	19
(Thailand) S Paewsampran (Thailand) P Supajirakul	21	21
(India) A Bhat (India) S Gautam	17	12
(India) T Jolly (India) G Gopichand	14	14
2	(Indonesia) A Rahayu (Indonesia) S F S Ramadhanti	21	21

Second round
(China) Li WM (China) Liu XX	21	16	20
Q1	(China) Li YJ (China) Luo XM	18	21	22
(Thailand) S Paewsampran (Thailand) P Supajirakul	17	13
2	(Indonesia) A Rahayu (Indonesia) S F S Ramadhanti	21	21

Quarter-finals
Q1	(China) Li YJ (China) Luo XM	20	15
2	(Indonesia) A Rahayu (Indonesia) S F S Ramadhanti	22	21

== Mixed doubles ==
=== Seeds ===
1. (Thailand) Dechapol Puavaranukroh / Sapsiree Taerattanachai (first round)
2. (France) Thom Gicquel / Delphine Delrue (withdrew)
3. (Malaysia) Tan Kian Meng / Lai Pei Jing (first round)
4. (Germany) Mark Lamsfuß / Isabel Lohau (second round)
5. (China) Feng Yanzhe / Huang Dongping (withdrew)
6. (Malaysia) Goh Soon Huat / Shevon Jemie Lai (final)
7. (Indonesia) Rinov Rivaldy / Pitha Haningtyas Mentari (quarter-finals)
8. (Netherlands) Robin Tabeling / Selena Piek (semi-finals)

=== Wildcard ===
Swiss Badminton awarded a wild card entry to Nicolas A. Müller and Ronja Stern of Switzerland.

=== Finals ===
Semi-finals
8	(Netherlands) Robin Tabeling (Netherlands) Selena Piek	14	21
6	(Malaysia) Goh Soon Huat (Malaysia) Shevon Jemie Lai	21	23
(Chinese Taipei) Ye Hong-wei (Chinese Taipei) Lee Chia-hsin	13	21
(China) Jiang Zhenbang (China) Wei Yaxin	21	23

Final
6	(Malaysia) Goh Soon Huat (Malaysia) Shevon Jemie Lai	17	21	17
(China) Jiang Zhenbang (China) Wei Yaxin	21	19	21

=== Top half ===
==== Section 1 ====
First round
1	(Thailand) D Puavaranukroh (Thailand) S Taerattanachai	18	23	16
Q1	(China) He JT (China) Du Y	21	21	21
WC	(Switzerland) N A. Müller (Switzerland) R Stern	11	13
(Malaysia) Chen T J (Malaysia) Toh E W	21	21
8	(Netherlands) R Tabeling (Netherlands) S Piek	15	21	21
Q3	(Chinese Taipei) Lee J-h (Chinese Taipei) Hsu Y-c	21	11	17
(Singapore) T Hee (Singapore) J Tan	20	21	21
Q2	(India) R Kapoor (India) N S Reddy	22	19	15

Second round
Q1	(China) He JT (China) Du Y	21	14	14
(Malaysia) Chen T J (Malaysia) Toh E W	11	21	21
8	(Netherlands) R Tabeling (Netherlands) S Piek	21	21
(Singapore) T Hee (Singapore) J Tan	14	16

Quarter-finals
(Malaysia) Chen T J (Malaysia) Toh E W	19	21	19
8	(Netherlands) R Tabeling (Netherlands) S Piek	21	19	21

==== Section 2 ====
First round
4	(Germany) M Lamsfuß (Germany) I Lohau	18	21	21
(Malaysia) Hoo P R (Malaysia) Teoh M X	21	18	19
(Thailand) S Jomkoh (Thailand) S Paewsampran	21	21
(Germany) J R Jansen (Germany) L Efler	12	15
6	(Malaysia) Goh S H (Malaysia) S J Lai	13	21	22
(Indonesia) P Jordan (Indonesia) M D Oktavianti	21	15	20
Q4	(Chinese Taipei) Chiu H-c (Chinese Taipei) Lin X-m	15	21	21
(Indonesia) Z J Sumanti (Indonesia) H Julimarbela	21	18	10

Second round
4	(Germany) M Lamsfuß (Germany) I Lohau	22	16
(Thailand) S Jomkoh (Thailand) S Paewsampran	24	21
6	(Malaysia) Goh S H (Malaysia) S J Lai	21	14	21
Q4	(Chinese Taipei) Chiu H-c (Chinese Taipei) Lin X-m	15	21	14

Quarter-finals
(Thailand) S Jomkoh (Thailand) S Paewsampran	18	18
6	(Malaysia) Goh S H (Malaysia) S J Lai	21	21

=== Bottom half ===
==== Section 3 ====
First round
(Denmark) M Christiansen (Denmark) A Bøje	21	21
(England) M Ellis (England) L Smith	12	10
(Indonesia) D Ferdinansyah (Indonesia) G E Widjaja	21	16	11
7	(Indonesia) R Rivaldy (Indonesia) P H Mentari	14	21	21
(Scotland) A Hall (Scotland) J MacPherson	18	18
(Chinese Taipei) Ye H-w (Chinese Taipei) Lee C-h	21	21
(Chinese Taipei) Yang P-h (Chinese Taipei) Hu L-f	21	21
3	(Malaysia) Tan K M (Malaysia) Lai P J	16	16

Second round
(Denmark) M Christiansen (Denmark) A Bøje	23	19
7	(Indonesia) R Rivaldy (Indonesia) P H Mentari	25	21
(Chinese Taipei) Ye H-w (Chinese Taipei) Lee C-h	21	25
(Chinese Taipei) Yang P-h (Chinese Taipei) Hu L-f	17	23

Quarter-finals
7	(Indonesia) R Rivaldy (Indonesia) P H Mentari	18	0^{r}
(Chinese Taipei) Ye H-w (Chinese Taipei) Lee C-h	21	0

==== Section 4 ====
First round
(Japan) H Midorikawa (Japan) N Saito	21	21
(Malaysia) Chan P S (Malaysia) Cheah Y S	15	19
(Indonesia) R N Kusharjanto (Indonesia) L A Kusumawati	21	21
PFQ	(Algeria) K Mammeri (Algeria) T Mammeri	16	9
(Denmark) M Thyrri (Denmark) A Magelund	18	22	17
(Japan) K Yamashita (Japan) N Shinoya	21	20	21
(China) Jiang ZB (China) Wei YX	21	21
PFQ	(Indonesia) A B Cahyono (Indonesia) M G Islami	15	16

Second round
(Japan) H Midorikawa (Japan) N Saito	21	21	24
(Indonesia) R N Kusharjanto (Indonesia) L A Kusumawati	18	23	22
(Japan) K Yamashita (Japan) N Shinoya	12	19
(China) Jiang ZB (China) Wei YX	21	21

Quarter-finals
(Japan) H Midorikawa (Japan) N Saito	9	15
(China) Jiang ZB (China) Wei YX	21	21

Preceded by 2023 All England Open; 2023 Ruichang China Masters	BWF World Tour; 2023 BWF season	Succeeded by 2023 Spain Masters
