= 2023 Denmark Open =

Tournament details
- Dates: 17 – 22 October
- Edition: 72nd
- Level: Super 750
- Total prize money: US$850,000
- Venue: Arena Fyn
- Location: Odense, Denmark

Champions
- Men's singles: (China) Weng Hongyang
- Women's singles: (China) Chen Yufei
- Men's doubles: (Malaysia) Aaron Chia (Malaysia) Soh Wooi Yik
- Women's doubles: (China) Chen Qingchen (China) Jia Yifan
- Mixed doubles: (China) Feng Yanzhe (China) Huang Dongping

The 2023 Denmark Open (officially known as the Victor Denmark Open 2023 for sponsorship reasons) was a badminton tournament that took place at the Arena Fyn in Odense, Denmark, from 17 to 22 October 2023 and had a total prize of US$850,000.

== Tournament ==
The 2023 Denmark Open was the twenty-fifth tournament according to the 2023 BWF World Tour. It was a part of the Denmark Open, which had been held since 1935. This tournament was organized by Badminton Denmark with sanction from the BWF.

=== Venue ===
This tournament was held at the Arena Fyn in Odense, Denmark.

=== Point distribution ===
Below is the point distribution table for each phase of the tournament based on the BWF points system for the BWF World Tour Super 750 event.

Winner	Runner-up	3/4	5/8	9/16	17/32
11,000	9,350	7,700	6,050	4,320	2,660

=== Prize money ===
The total prize money for this tournament was US$750,000. Distribution of prize money was in accordance with BWF regulations.

Event	Winner	Finals	Semi-finals	Quarter-finals	Last 16	Last 32
Singles	$59,500	$28,900	$11,900	$4,675	$2,550	$850
Doubles	$62,900	$29,750	$11,900	$5,312.5	$2,762.5	$850

== Men's singles ==
=== Seeds ===
1. (Denmark) Viktor Axelsen (Second round)
2. (Indonesia) Anthony Sinisuka Ginting (Quarter-finals)
3. (Japan) Kodai Naraoka (First round)
4. (Thailand) Kunlavut Vitidsarn (First round)
5. (Indonesia) Jonatan Christie (First round)
6. (China) Shi Yuqi (Semi-finals)
7. (India) Prannoy H. S. (Withdrew)
8. (China) Li Shifeng (First round)

=== Finals ===
Semi-finals
(Malaysia) Lee Zii Jia	21	21
(Hong Kong) Lee Cheuk Yiu	15	17
6	(China) Shi Yuqi	19	14
(China) Weng Hongyang	21	21

Final
(Malaysia) Lee Zii Jia	12	6
(China) Weng Hongyang	21	21

=== Top half ===
==== Section 1 ====
First round
1	(Denmark) V Axelsen	21	21
(Denmark) M Johannesen	7	9
PFR	(Belgium) J Carraggi	21	15	10
(Malaysia) Lee Z J	19	21	21
5	(Indonesia) J Christie	17	12
(Chinese Taipei) Chou T-c	21	21
(China) Zhao JP	22	11	17
(Japan) K Nishimoto	20	21	21

Second round
1	(Denmark) V Axelsen
(Malaysia) Lee Z J	w	/	o
(Chinese Taipei) Chou T-c	21	19	14
(Japan) K Nishimoto	10	21	21

Quarter-finals
(Malaysia) Lee Z J	21	21
(Japan) K Nishimoto	18	18

==== Section 2 ====
First round
4	(Thailand) K Vitidsarn	15	21	19
(Denmark) R Gemke	21	15	21
(Chinese Taipei) Lin C-y	20	21	21
(Japan) K Tsuneyama	22	15	19
PFR	(Israel) M Zilberman	21	17	11
(Japan) K Watanabe	16	21	21
(Chinese Taipei) Wang T-w	21	10	13
(Hong Kong) Lee C Y	19	21	21

Second round
(Denmark) R Gemke	21	25
(Chinese Taipei) Lin C-y	18	23
(Japan) K Watanabe	21	21	14
(Hong Kong) Lee C Y	3	23	21

Quarter-finals
(Denmark) R Gemke	17	12
(Hong Kong) Lee C Y	21	21

=== Bottom half ===
==== Section 3 ====
First round
(Thailand) K Wangcharoen	21	21
(India) L Sen	16	18
(Hong Kong) Ng K L	13	0^{r}
6	(China) Shi YQ	21	3
(Denmark) A Antonsen	21	21
PFR	(Republic of Ireland) N Nguyen	18	13
(Singapore) Loh K Y	19	21	21
3	(Japan) K Naraoka	21	6	19

Second round
(Thailand) K Wangcharoen	7	23	18
6	(China) Shi YQ	21	21	21
(Denmark) A Antonsen	19	19
(Singapore) Loh K Y	21	21

Quarter-finals
6	(China) Shi YQ	21	21
(Singapore) Loh K Y	11	19

==== Section 4 ====
First round
(China) Weng HY	19	21	21
(India) S Kidambi	21	10	16
(France) T J Popov	12	21	21
8	(China) Li SF	21	6	17
(Malaysia) Ng T Y	18	11
(China) Lu GZ	21	21
(France) C Popov	15	15
2	(Indonesia) A S Ginting	21	21

Second round
(China) Weng HY	21	25
(France) T J Popov	16	23
(China) Lu GZ	14	20
2	(Indonesia) A S Ginting	21	22

Quarter-finals
(China) Weng HY	21	21
2	(Indonesia) A S Ginting	15	9

== Women's singles ==
=== Seeds ===
1. (South Korea) An Se-young (Withdrew)
2. (Japan) Akane Yamaguchi (Withdrew)
3. (China) Chen Yufei (Champion)
4. (Chinese Taipei) Tai Tzu-ying (Quarter-finals)
5. (China) He Bingjiao (Quarter-finals)
6. (Spain) Carolina Marín (Final)
7. (Indonesia) Gregoria Mariska Tunjung (Second round)
8. (China) Han Yue (Semi-finals)

=== Finals ===
Semi-finals
8	(China) Han Yue	18	12
3	(China) Chen Yufei	21	21
6	(Spain) Carolina Marín	21	19	21
(India) P. V. Sindhu	18	21	7

Final
3	(China) Chen Yufei	21	21
6	(Spain) Carolina Marín	14	19

=== Top half ===
==== Section 1 ====
First round
PFR	(Spain) C Azurmendi	8	20
(China) Zhang YM	21	22
(Denmark) L Christophersen	21	21
(Denmark) M Blichfeldt	18	14
8	(China) Han Y	21	21
(Chinese Taipei) Pai Y-p	7	12
(Chinese Taipei) Hsu W-c	15	19
(Vietnam) Nguyễn T L	21	21

Second round
(China) Zhang YM	21	21
(Denmark) L Christophersen	19	11
8	(China) Han Y	21	21
(Vietnam) Nguyễn T L	14	10

Quarter-finals
(China) Zhang YM	14	21	17
8	(China) Han Y	21	12	21

==== Section 2 ====
First round
3	(China) Chen YF	21	21
(Indonesia) P K Wardani	9	9
(China) Wang ZY	21	21
(Japan) S Kawakami	15	13
5	(China) He BJ	21	21
(Malaysia) Goh J W	11	10
(Denmark) L Kjærsfeldt	19	21	22
(Thailand) P Chochuwong	21	17	24

Second round
3	(China) Chen YF	21	21
(China) Wang ZY	14	16
5	(China) He BJ	17	21	22
(Thailand) P Chochuwong	21	17	20

Quarter-finals
3	(China) Chen YF	21	21
5	(China) He BJ	15	18

=== Bottom half ===
==== Section 3 ====
First round
(South Korea) Kim G-e	11	15
(Chinese Taipei) Sung S-y	21	21
(China) Gao FJ	8^{r}
6	(Spain) C Marín	11
(Japan) A Ohori	10	13
(Thailand) B Ongbamrungphan	21	21
(Singapore) Yeo J M	11	20
4	(Chinese Taipei) Tai T-y	21	22

Second round
(Chinese Taipei) Sung S-y	20	20
6	(Spain) C Marín	22	22
(Thailand) B Ongbamrungphan	20	12
4	(Chinese Taipei) Tai T-y	22	21

Quarter-finals
6	(Spain) C Marín	19	21	21
4	(Chinese Taipei) Tai T-y	21	15	18

==== Section 4 ====
First round
(Scotland) K Gilmour	14	21	10
(India) P. V. Sindhu	21	18	21
(Japan) N Okuhara	11	12
7	(Indonesia) G M Tunjung	21	21
(Thailand) S Katethong	23	21
(Japan) N Nidaira	21	13
(Germany) Y Li	21	20	12
PFR	(India) A Kashyap	10	22	21

Second round
(India) P. V. Sindhu	18	21	21
7	(Indonesia) G M Tunjung	21	15	13
(Thailand) S Katethong	21	21
PFR	(India) A Kashyap	18	8

Quarter-finals
(India) P. V. Sindhu	21	21
(Thailand) S Katethong	19	12

== Men's doubles ==
=== Seeds ===
1. (Indonesia) Fajar Alfian / Muhammad Rian Ardianto (Semi-finals)
2. (China) Liang Weikeng / Wang Chang (First round)
3. (India) Satwiksairaj Rankireddy / Chirag Shetty (Withdrew)
4. (South Korea) Kang Min-hyuk / Seo Seung-jae (Second round)
5. (Malaysia) Aaron Chia / Soh Wooi Yik (Champions)
6. (Japan) Takuro Hoki / Yugo Kobayashi (Second round)
7. (Denmark) Kim Astrup / Anders Skaarup Rasmussen (Semi-finals)
8. (China) Liu Yuchen / Ou Xuanyi (First round)

=== Finals ===
Semi-finals
1	(Indonesia) Fajar Alfian (Indonesia) Muhammad Rian Ardianto	11	21	12
(Indonesia) Muhammad Shohibul Fikri (Indonesia) Bagas Maulana	21	16	21
7	(Denmark) Kim Astrup (Denmark) Anders Skaarup Rasmussen	21	15	15
5	(Malaysia) Aaron Chia (Malaysia) Soh Wooi Yik	16	21	21

Final
(Indonesia) Muhammad Shohibul Fikri (Indonesia) Bagas Maulana	13	17
5	(Malaysia) Aaron Chia (Malaysia) Soh Wooi Yik	21	21

=== Top half ===
==== Section 1 ====
First round
1	(Indonesia) F Alfian (Indonesia) M R Ardianto	21	21
(Chinese Taipei) Lu C-y (Chinese Taipei) Yang P-ha	19	14
(China) Chen BY (China) Liu Y	14	21	16
(England) B Lane (England) S Vendy	21	12	21
6	(Japan) T Hoki (Japan) Y Kobayashi	21	21
(France) L Corvée (France) R Labar	9	7
(South Korea) Jin Y (South Korea) Na S-s	16	21	21
(Indonesia) L R Carnando (Indonesia) D Marthin	21	12	15

Second round
1	(Indonesia) F Alfian (Indonesia) M R Ardianto	19	21	21
(England) B Lane (England) S Vendy	21	19	19
6	(Japan) T Hoki (Japan) Y Kobayashi	18	21	18
(South Korea) Jin Y (South Korea) Na S-s	21	13	21

Quarter-finals
1	(Indonesia) F Alfian (Indonesia) M R Ardianto	21	21
(South Korea) Jin Y (South Korea) Na S-s	15	14

==== Section 2 ====
First round
4	(South Korea) Kang M-h (South Korea) Seo S-j	21	21
PFR	(Thailand) P Thongkam (Thailand) W Thongkam	7	10
(Indonesia) M S Fikri (Indonesia) B Maulana	21	21
(Scotland) A Dunn (Scotland) A Hall	17	15
8	(China) Liu YC (China) Ou XY	17	16
(Chinese Taipei) Lee J-h (Chinese Taipei) Yang P-hs	21	21
(Chinese Taipei) Lee Y (Chinese Taipei) Wang C-l	21	21
(Thailand) S Jomkoh (Thailand) K Kedren	17	8

Second round
4	(South Korea) Kang M-h (South Korea) Seo S-j	17	22
(Indonesia) M S Fikri (Indonesia) B Maulana	21	24
(Chinese Taipei) Lee J-h (Chinese Taipei) Yang P-hs	21	21
(Chinese Taipei) Lee Y (Chinese Taipei) Wang C-l	13	15

Quarter-finals
(Indonesia) M S Fikri (Indonesia) B Maulana	22	19	21
(Chinese Taipei) Lee J-h (Chinese Taipei) Yang P-hs	20	21	15

=== Bottom half ===
==== Section 3 ====
First round
(Germany) M Lamsfuß (Germany) M Seidel	17	21	21
(China) Tan Q (China) Zhou HD	21	16	17
(Japan) K Matsui (Japan) Y Takeuchi	14	17
7	(Denmark) K Astrup (Denmark) A S Rasmussen	21	21
(Japan) A Koga (Japan) T Saito	21	21
(Malaysia) Man W C (Malaysia) Tee K W	18	16
(Malaysia) Ong Y S (Malaysia) Teo E Y	w	/	o
3	(India) S Rankireddy (India) C Shetty

Second round
(Germany) M Lamsfuß (Germany) M Seidel	22	11	18
7	(Denmark) K Astrup (Denmark) A S Rasmussen	20	21	21
(Japan) A Koga (Japan) T Saito	17	20
(Malaysia) Ong Y S (Malaysia) Teo E Y	21	22

Quarter-finals
7	(Denmark) K Astrup (Denmark) A S Rasmussen	21	11	21
(Malaysia) Ong Y S (Malaysia) Teo E Y	19	21	14

==== Section 4 ====
First round
(Indonesia) P Kusumawardana (Indonesia) Y Rambitan	28	15
(Indonesia) M Ahsan (Indonesia) H Setiawan	30	21
(France) C Popov (France) T J Popov	16	18
5	(Malaysia) A Chia (Malaysia) Soh W Y	21	21
(China) He JT (China) Ren XY	w	/	o
(South Korea) Choi S-g (South Korea) Kim W-h
(Denmark) R Kjær (Denmark) F Søgaard	18	21	21
2	(China) Liang WK (China) Wang C	21	19	18

Second round
(Indonesia) M Ahsan (Indonesia) H Setiawan	21	5	15
5	(Malaysia) A Chia (Malaysia) Soh W Y	16	21	21
(China) He JT (China) Ren XY	21	21
(Denmark) R Kjær (Denmark) F Søgaard	15	5

Quarter-finals
5	(Malaysia) A Chia (Malaysia) Soh W Y	24	18	21
(China) He JT (China) Ren XY	22	21	12

== Women's doubles ==
=== Seeds ===
1. (China) Chen Qingchen / Jia Yifan (Champions)
2. (South Korea) Baek Ha-na / Lee So-hee (Withdrew)
3. (South Korea) Kim So-yeong / Kong Hee-yong (Withdrew)
4. (Japan) Yuki Fukushima / Sayaka Hirota (First round)
5. (Japan) Nami Matsuyama / Chiharu Shida (Finals)
6. (China) Zhang Shuxian / Zheng Yu (Quarter-finals)
7. (Indonesia) Apriyani Rahayu / Siti Fadia Silva Ramadhanti (Withdrew)
8. (Japan) Mayu Matsumoto / Wakana Nagahara (Semi-finals)

=== Finals ===
Semi-finals
1	(China) Chen Qingchen (China) Jia Yifan	21	21
(Japan) Rin Iwanaga (Japan) Kie Nakanishi	10	18
5	(Japan) Nami Matsuyama (Japan) Chiharu Shida	12	21	21
8	(Japan) Mayu Matsumoto (Japan) Wakana Nagahara	21	13	14

Final
1	(China) Chen Qingchen (China) Jia Yifan	21	21
5	(Japan) Nami Matsuyama (Japan) Chiharu Shida	16	13

=== Top half ===
==== Section 1 ====
First round
1	(China) Chen QC (China) Jia YF	22	21
(France) M Lambert (France) A Tran	20	16
(Malaysia) P Tan (Malaysia) Thinaah M
(Thailand) J Kititharakul (Thailand) R Prajongjai	w	/	o
7	(Indonesia) A Rahayu (Indonesia) S F S Ramadhanti
(Hong Kong) Yeung N T (Hong Kong) Yeung P L	w	/	o
(Malaysia) V Hoo (Malaysia) Lim C S	21	19	21
(Germany) L Efler (Germany) I Lohau	18	21	17

Second round
1	(China) Chen QC (China) Jia YF	21	21
(Thailand) J Kititharakul (Thailand) R Prajongjai	12	14
(Hong Kong) Yeung N T (Hong Kong) Yeung P L	21	17	22
(Malaysia) V Hoo (Malaysia) Lim C S	15	21	20

Quarter-finals
1	(China) Chen QC (China) Jia YF	21	21
(Hong Kong) Yeung N T (Hong Kong) Yeung P L	14	15

==== Section 2 ====
First round
3	(South Korea) Kim S-y (South Korea) Kong H-y
(China) Liu SS (China) Tan N	w	/	o
(Japan) R Iwanaga (Japan) K Nakanishi	21	21
(Denmark) M Fruergaard (Denmark) S Thygesen	16	15
6	(China) Zhang SX (China) Zheng Y	21	21
(Malaysia) A Cheong (Malaysia) Teoh M X	18	14
(Chinese Taipei) Lee C-h (Chinese Taipei) Teng C-h	21	6
(Netherlands) D Jille (Netherlands) C Seinen	10	5^{r}

Second round
(China) Liu SS (China) Tan N	15	15
(Japan) R Iwanaga (Japan) K Nakanishi	21	21
6	(China) Zhang SX (China) Zheng Y	21	21
(Chinese Taipei) Lee C-h (Chinese Taipei) Teng C-h	10	14

Quarter-finals
(Japan) R Iwanaga (Japan) K Nakanishi	17	21	23
6	(China) Zhang SX (China) Zheng Y	21	18	21

=== Bottom half ===
==== Section 3 ====
First round
(Bulgaria) G Stoeva (Bulgaria) S Stoeva	20	16
(Japan) R Miyaura (Japan) A Sakuramoto	22	21
PFR	(United States) F Corbett (United States) A Lee	20	14
5	(Japan) N Matsuyama (Japan) C Shida	22	21
PFR	(United States) P L Cao Hok (United States) L Lam	2	3^{r}
(Thailand) B Aimsaard (Thailand) N Aimsaard	21	12
(China) Li YJ (China) Luo XM	21	21	21
4	(Japan) Y Fukushima (Japan) S Hirota	15	23	18

Second round
(Japan) R Miyaura (Japan) A Sakuramoto	21	19	0^{r}
5	(Japan) N Matsuyama (Japan) C Shida	19	21	0
(Thailand) B Aimsaard (Thailand) N Aimsaard	23	21
(China) Li YJ (China) Luo XM	21	12

Quarter-finals
5	(Japan) N Matsuyama (Japan) C Shida	21	21
(Thailand) B Aimsaard (Thailand) N Aimsaard	16	14

==== Section 4 ====
First round
(South Korea) Jeong N-e (South Korea) Kim H-j	21	21
(South Korea) Lee Y-l (South Korea) Shin S-c	11	13
(Chinese Taipei) Hsu Y-c (Chinese Taipei) Lin W-c	11	16
8	(Japan) M Matsumoto (Japan) W Nagahara	21	21
(Indonesia) F D Kusuma (Indonesia) A C Pratiwi	21	21
(Scotland) J MacPherson (Scotland) C Torrance	14	17
(Japan) R Hirokami (Japan) Y Kato	12	21	21
PFR	(Chinese Taipei) Sung S-y (Chinese Taipei) Yu C-h	21	15	16

Second round
(South Korea) Jeong N-e (South Korea) Kim H-j	14	21	18
8	(Japan) M Matsumoto (Japan) W Nagahara	21	17	21
(Indonesia) F D Kusuma (Indonesia) A C Pratiwi	21	21
(Japan) R Hirokami (Japan) Y Kato	17	17

Quarter-finals
8	(Japan) M Matsumoto (Japan) W Nagahara	17	21	21
(Indonesia) F D Kusuma (Indonesia) A C Pratiwi	21	14	17

== Mixed doubles ==
=== Seeds ===
1. (China) Zheng Siwei / Huang Yaqiong (Final)
2. (Japan) Yuta Watanabe / Arisa Higashino (Second round)
3. (China) Feng Yanzhe / Huang Dongping (Champions)
4. (South Korea) Seo Seung-jae / Chae Yoo-jung (Semi-finals)
5. (Thailand) Dechapol Puavaranukroh / Sapsiree Taerattanachai (Quarter-finals)
6. (South Korea) Kim Won-ho / Jeong Na-eun (Quarter-finals)
7. (France) Thom Gicquel / Delphine Delrue (Quarter-finals)
8. (China) Jiang Zhenbang / Wei Yaxin (Second round)

=== Finals ===
Semi-finals
1	(China) Zheng Siwei (China) Huang Yaqiong	21	21
4	(South Korea) Seo Seung-jae (South Korea) Chae Yoo-jung	16	16
3	(China) Feng Yanzhe (China) Huang Dongping	21	21
(Denmark) Mathias Christiansen (Denmark) Alexandra Bøje	13	19

Final
1	(China) Zheng Siwei (China) Huang Yaqiong	21	15	24
3	(China) Feng Yanzhe (China) Huang Dongping	16	21	26

=== Top half ===
==== Section 1 ====
First round
1	(China) Zheng SW (China) Huang YQ	22	21
(England) G Mairs (England) J Mairs	20	10
(Germany) M Lamsfuß (Germany) I Lohau	21	15	15
(Indonesia) D Ferdinansyah (Indonesia) G E Widjaja	13	21	21
5	(Thailand) D Puavaranukroh (Thailand) S Taerattanachai	17	21	21
(England) M Ellis (England) L Smith	21	15	19
(Denmark) M Thyrri (Denmark) A Magelund	15	21
(Malaysia) Chen T J (Malaysia) Toh E W	21	23

Second round
1	(China) Zheng SW (China) Huang YQ	21	21
(Indonesia) D Ferdinansyah (Indonesia) G E Widjaja	18	9
5	(Thailand) D Puavaranukroh (Thailand) S Taerattanachai	21	21
(Malaysia) Chen T J (Malaysia) Toh E W	15	12

Quarter-finals
1	(China) Zheng SW (China) Huang YQ	21	18	21
5	(Thailand) D Puavaranukroh (Thailand) S Taerattanachai	10	21	15

==== Section 2 ====
First round
4	(South Korea) Seo S-j (South Korea) Chae Y-j	21	21
(Hong Kong) Lee C H (Hong Kong) Ng T Y	11	17
(Indonesia) P Jordan (Indonesia) M D Oktavianti	21	18	14
(China) Cheng X (China) Chen FH	11	21	21
7	(France) T Gicquel (France) D Delrue	14	21	21
(Japan) Y Kaneko (Japan) M Matsutomo	21	9	17
(Chinese Taipei) Yang P-hs (Chinese Taipei) Hu L-f	21	21
(Scotland) A Hall (Scotland) J MacPherson	14	18

Second round
4	(South Korea) Seo S-j (South Korea) Chae Y-j	21	21
(China) Cheng X (China) Chen FH	14	12
7	(France) T Gicquel (France) D Delrue	19	21	21
(Chinese Taipei) Yang P-hs (Chinese Taipei) Hu L-f	21	13	19

Quarter-finals
4	(South Korea) Seo S-j (South Korea) Chae Y-j	22	21	22
7	(France) T Gicquel (France) D Delrue	24	19	20

=== Bottom half ===
==== Section 3 ====
First round
(Malaysia) Tan K M (Malaysia) Lai P J	16	10
(Netherlands) R Tabeling (Netherlands) S Piek	21	21
(Indonesia) R N Kusharjanto (Indonesia) L A Kusumawati	17	21	16
6	(South Korea) Kim W-h (South Korea) Jeong N-e	21	14	21
(Chinese Taipei) Lee J-h (Chinese Taipei) Hsu Y-c	21	21
(Thailand) S Jomkoh (Thailand) S Paewsampran	15	13
(Indonesia) R Rivaldy (Indonesia) P H Mentari	13	12
3	(China) Feng YZ (China) Huang DP	21	21

Second round
(Netherlands) R Tabeling (Netherlands) S Piek	18	18
6	(South Korea) Kim W-h (South Korea) Jeong N-e	21	21
(Chinese Taipei) Lee J-h (Chinese Taipei) Hsu Y-c	15	10
3	(China) Feng YZ (China) Huang DP	21	21

Quarter-finals
6	(South Korea) Kim W-h (South Korea) Jeong N-e	21	14	13
3	(China) Feng YZ (China) Huang DP	18	21	21

==== Section 4 ====
First round
(Denmark) M Christiansen (Denmark) A Bøje	21	18	21
(Hong Kong) Tang C M (Hong Kong) Tse Y S	17	21	19
(Japan) H Midorikawa (Japan) N Saito	15	16
8	(China) Jiang ZB (China) Wei YX	21	21
(Chinese Taipei) Ye H-w (Chinese Taipei) Lee C-h	19	22	21
(Malaysia) Goh S H (Malaysia) S J Lai	21	20	17
(Japan) K Yamashita (Japan) N Shinoya	12	11
2	(Japan) Y Watanabe (Japan) A Higashino	21	21

Second round
(Denmark) M Christiansen (Denmark) A Bøje	16	21	21
8	(China) Jiang ZB (China) Wei YX	21	14	18
(Chinese Taipei) Ye H-w (Chinese Taipei) Lee C-h	21	11	21
2	(Japan) Y Watanabe (Japan) A Higashino	18	21	18

Quarter-finals
(Denmark) M Christiansen (Denmark) A Bøje	21	18	21
(Chinese Taipei) Ye H-w (Chinese Taipei) Lee C-h	17	21	13

Preceded by 2022 Denmark Open	Denmark Open	Succeeded by 2024 Denmark Open
Preceded by 2023 Arctic Open	BWF World Tour; 2023 BWF season	Succeeded by 2023 French Open; 2023 Indonesia Masters Super 100 II
