= 2017 Badminton Asia Junior Championships – Boys' doubles =

Tournament details
- Dates: 26–30 July 2017
- Edition: 20
- Venue: Jaya Raya Sports Hall Training Center
- Location: Jakarta, Indonesia

The boys' doubles tournament of the 2017 Asian Junior Badminton Championships was held from July 26 to 30. The defending champions of the last edition were Han Chengkai and Zhou Haodong from China. The Chinese pair Di Zijian and Wang Chang claim the title after defeat the No. 2 seed from South Korea Lee Sang-min and Na Sung-seung in straight games with the score 21–19, 21–11.

== Seeded ==
1. (India) Krishna Prasad Garaga / Dhruv Kapila (quarterfinals)
2. (South Korea) Lee Sang-min / Na Sung-seung (Finals)
3. (Chinese Taipei) Su Li-wei / Ye Hong-wei (second round)
4. (Thailand) Wachirawit Sothon / Natthapat Trinkajee (quarterfinals)
5. (Indonesia) Rehan Naufal Kusharjanto / Rinov Rivaldy (second round)
6. (China) Chen Sihang / Fan Qiuyue (third round)
7. (Malaysia) Chang Yee Jun / Ng Eng Cheong (third round)
8. (Kazakhstan) Dmitriy Panarin / Ikramzhan Yuldashev (second round)

== Draw ==
=== Finals ===
Quarterfinals
1	(India) Krishna Prasad Garaga (India) Dhruv Kapila	21	11
(Malaysia) Chia Wei Jie (Malaysia) Ng Tze Yong	23	21
4	(Thailand) Wachirawit Sothon (Thailand) Natthapat Trinkajee	15	21	16
(China) Di Zijian (China) Wang Chang	21	19	21
(South Korea) Shin Tae-yang (South Korea) Wang Chan	21	21
(Indonesia) Abiyyu Fauzan Majid (Indonesia) Muhammad Shohibul Fikri	18	18
(Indonesia) Rizki Adam (Indonesia) Adnan Maulana	23	18	19
2	(South Korea) Lee Sang-min (South Korea) Na Sung-seung	21	21	21

Semifinals
(Malaysia) Chia Wei Jie (Malaysia) Ng Tze Yong	21	13
(China) Di Zijian (China) Wang Chang	23	21
(South Korea) Shin Tae-yang (South Korea) Wang Chan	21	10	19
2	(South Korea) Lee Sang-min (South Korea) Na Sung-seung	18	21	21

Final
(China) Di Zijian (China) Wang Chang	21	21
2	(South Korea) Lee Sang-min (South Korea) Na Sung-seung	19	11

=== Top half ===
==== Section 1 ====
First round
(Indonesia) G A Prihardika (Indonesia) F M Ranialdy	21	21
(Singapore) I Go (Singapore) R Loh	7	10
(Mongolia) M Batsukh (Mongolia) S Enkhbat	w	/	o
(Philippines) A S Salvado (Philippines) L R Zafra

Second round
1	(India) K P Garaga (India) D Kapila	21	21
(Indonesia) G A Prihardika (Indonesia) F M Ranialdy	19	19
(China) Chen K (China) Tang YZ	21	21
(Philippines) A S Salvado (Philippines) L R Zafra	12	16

Third round
1	(India) K P Garaga (India) D Kapila	18	22	21
(China) Chen K (China) Tang YZ	21	20	13

==== Section 2 ====
First round
(Iraq) K Hussein (Iraq) M Talib	6	8
(Chinese Taipei) Lu C (Chinese Taipei) Su P-w	21	21
(Malaysia) Chia W J (Malaysia) Ng T Y	21	2
(Myanmar) Arkar P M (Myanmar) Hein S T T	17	18

Second round
8	(Kazakhstan) D Panarin (Kazakhstan) I Yuldashev	11	9
(Chinese Taipei) Lu C (Chinese Taipei) Su P-w	21	21
(Hong Kong) Chow H L (Hong Kong) Lee C L	13	18
(Malaysia) Chia W J (Malaysia) Ng T Y	21	21

Third round
(Chinese Taipei) Lu C (Chinese Taipei) Su P-w	17	22
(Malaysia) Chia W J (Malaysia) Ng T Y	21	24

==== Section 3 ====
First round
(Macau) Ao F L (Macau) Pui P F	13	12
(Chinese Taipei) Chang H-c (Chinese Taipei) Yu Y	21	21
(Sri Lanka) S Gunatilleke (Sri Lanka) R Sasindu	21	21
(Cambodia) Oeng P L (Cambodia) Sum S S	12	12

Second round
4	(Thailand) W Sothon (Thailand) N Trinkajee	21	19	21
(Chinese Taipei) Chang H-c (Chinese Taipei) Yu Y	18	21	13
(Vietnam) Tran Q D (Vietnam) Vu M P	21	16	11
(Sri Lanka) S Gunatilleke (Sri Lanka) R Sasindu	16	21	21

Third round
4	(Thailand) W Sothon (Thailand) N Trinkajee	21	21
(Sri Lanka) S Gunatilleke (Sri Lanka) R Sasindu	11	15

==== Section 4 ====
First round
(Singapore) D M Ng (Singapore) H Wong	14	16
(China) Di ZJ (China) Wang C	21	21
(Pakistan) A B Khan (Pakistan) S Riaz	9	6
(South Korea) Kang M-h (South Korea) Woo S-h	21	21

Second round
5	(Indonesia) R N Kusharjanto (Indonesia) R Rivaldy	19	14
(China) Di ZJ (China) Wang C	21	21
(Malaysia) Kwek Y J (Malaysia) Man W C	12	19
(South Korea) Kang M-h (South Korea) Woo S-h	21	21

Third round
(China) Di ZJ (China) Wang C	21	19	21
(South Korea) Kang M-h (South Korea) Woo S-h	18	21	17

=== Bottom half ===
==== Section 5 ====
First round
(Sri Lanka) V Fernando (Sri Lanka) R Hendahewa	21	21
(Iraq) Y Alhumairi (Iraq) M Nabeel	13	11
(South Korea) Shin T-y (South Korea) Wang C	21	21
(Pakistan) S D Ali (Pakistan) R M Z Haider	7	1
(Indonesia) E R Febryto (Indonesia) A R Kasturo	21	21
(Uzbekistan) A Khadjaev (Uzbekistan) T Turakhonov	6	11

Second round
(Sri Lanka) V Fernando (Sri Lanka) R Hendahewa	7	7
(South Korea) Shin T-y (South Korea) Wang C	21	21
(Indonesia) E R Febryto (Indonesia) A R Kasturo	22	8	11
6	(China) Chen SY (China) Fan QY	20	21	21

Third round
(South Korea) Shin T-y (South Korea) Wang C	21	13	21
6	(China) Chen SY (China) Fan QY	19	21	16

==== Section 6 ====
First round
(Macau) Che P N (Macau) Lam H H	7	16
(India) V V G Panjala (India) S S K Podile	21	21
(Indonesia) A F Majid (Indonesia) M S Fikri	21	21
(Hong Kong) Ko S H (Hong Kong) Lui C W	14	15

Second round
(India) V V G Panjala (India) S S K Podile	27	15
(Thailand) P Nipornram (Thailand) K Vitidsarn	29	21
(Indonesia) A F Majid (Indonesia) M S Fikri	21	12	21
3	(Chinese Taipei) Su L-w (Chinese Taipei) Ye H-w	17	21	19

Third round
(Thailand) P Nipornram (Thailand) K Vitidsarn	19	17
(Indonesia) A F Majid (Indonesia) M S Fikri	21	21

==== Section 7 ====
First round
(Cambodia) Heng M L (Cambodia) Saom D	7	8
(Iran) A Hosseinkhani (Iran) A Jabbari	21	21
(Singapore) A Tan (Singapore) Toh H Z	21	16	19
(Thailand) W Jianpipatgun (Thailand) W Sarapat	18	21	21

Second round
(Iran) A Hosseinkhani (Iran) A Jabbari	9	18
(Indonesia) R Adam (Indonesia) A Maulana	21	21
(Thailand) W Jianpipatgun (Thailand) W Sarapat	22	16
7	(Malaysia) Chang Y J (Malaysia) Ng E C	24	21

Third round
(Indonesia) R Adam (Indonesia) A Maulana	21	14	22
7	(Malaysia) Chang Y J (Malaysia) Ng E C	13	21	20

==== Section 8 ====
First round
(Vietnam) Le T L (Vietnam) Nguyen X M	21	21
(Sri Lanka) C Dias (Sri Lanka) C Illeperumachchi	11	7
(Nepal) P Maharjan (Nepal) R Maharjan	12	15
(Hong Kong) Chan Y W (Hong Kong) Mak P N	21	21

Second round
(Vietnam) Le T L (Vietnam) Nguyen X M	17	12
(India) S Bora (India) S P Karri	21	21
(Hong Kong) Chan Y W (Hong Kong) Mak P N	9	16
2	(South Korea) Lee S-m (South Korea) Na S-s	21	21

Third round
(India) S Bora (India) S P Karri	19	19
2	(South Korea) Lee S-m (South Korea) Na S-s	21	21
