= 2023 Thailand Open (badminton) =

2023 badminton tournament in Thailand

Tournament details
- Dates: 30 May–4 June
- Edition: 35th
- Level: Super 500
- Total prize money: US$420,000
- Venue: Indoor Stadium Huamark
- Location: Bangkok, Thailand

Champions
- Men's singles: (Thailand) Kunlavut Vitidsarn
- Women's singles: (South Korea) An Se-young
- Men's doubles: (China) Liang Weikeng (China) Wang Chang
- Women's doubles: (South Korea) Kim So-yeong (South Korea) Kong Hee-yong
- Mixed doubles: (South Korea) Kim Won-ho (South Korea) Jeong Na-eun

The 2023 Thailand Open (officially known as the Toyota Gazoo Racing Thailand Open 2023) was a badminton tournament that took place at Indoor Stadium Huamark in Bangkok, Thailand, from 30 May to 4 June 2023. The tournament had a total prize pool of $420,000.

== Tournament ==
The 2023 Thailand Open was the twelfth tournament of the 2023 BWF World Tour and was part of the Thailand Open championships, which had been held since 1984. This tournament was organized by the Badminton Association of Thailand with sanction from the BWF.

=== Venue ===
This international tournament was held at the Indoor Stadium Huamark in Bangkok, Thailand.

=== Point distribution ===
Below is the point distribution table for each phase of the tournament based on the BWF points system for the BWF World Tour Super 500 event.

Winner	Runner-up	3/4	5/8	9/16	17/32	33/64	65/128
9,200	7,800	6,420	5,040	3,600	2,220	880	430

=== Prize pool ===
The total prize money was US$420,000 with the distribution of the prize money in accordance with BWF regulations.

Event	Winner	Finalist	Semi-finals	Quarter-finals	Last 16
Singles	$31,500	$15,960	$6,090	$2,520	$1,470
Doubles	$33,180	$15,960	$5,880	$3,045	$1,575

== Men's singles ==
=== Seeds ===
1. (Chinese Taipei) Chou Tien-chen (Second round)
2. (Thailand) Kunlavut Vitidsarn (Champion)
3. (China) Shi Yuqi (First round)
4. (China) Li Shifeng (Second round)
5. (China) Lu Guangzu (Quarter-finals)
6. (Hong Kong) Ng Ka Long (Second round)
7. (China) Zhao Junpeng (withdrew)
8. (Hong Kong) Lee Cheuk Yiu (Final)

=== Finals ===
Semi-finals
8	(Hong Kong) Lee Cheuk Yiu	21	21
(France) Toma Junior Popov	14	16
(India) Lakshya Sen	21	17	13
2	(Thailand) Kunlavut Vitidsarn	13	21	21

Final
8	(Hong Kong) Lee Cheuk Yiu	12	10
2	(Thailand) Kunlavut Vitidsarn	21	21

=== Top half ===
==== Section 1 ====
First round
1	(Chinese Taipei) Chou T-c	18	21	21
(Chinese Taipei) Lin C-y	21	17	12
(Malaysia) Ng T Y	21	21
(India) P Rajawat	19	10
8	(Hong Kong) Lee C Y	15	21	21
(Denmark) R Gemke	21	9	18
Q1	(India) S Verma	15	15
(Denmark) M Johannesen	21	21

Second round
1	(Chinese Taipei) Chou T-c	21	21
(Malaysia) Ng T Y	23	23
8	(Hong Kong) Lee C Y	18	21	21
(Denmark) M Johannesen	21	9	18

Quarter-finals
(Malaysia) Ng T Y	19	21
8	(Hong Kong) Lee C Y	21	23

==== Section 2 ====
First round
3	(China) Shi YQ	18	20
Q3	(India) K George	21	22
(India) K Srikanth	8	21	14
(China) Weng HY	21	16	21
6	(Hong Kong) Ng K L	17	21	21
Q4	(Chinese Taipei) Lee C-h	21	12	17
(Republic of Ireland) N Nguyen	15	18
(France) T J Popov	21	21

Second round
Q3	(India) K George	21	21
(China) Weng HY	11	19
6	(Hong Kong) Ng K L	17	20
(France) T J Popov	21	22

Quarter-finals
Q3	(India) K George	16	17
(France) T J Popov	21	21

=== Bottom half ===
==== Section 3 ====
First round
(Thailand) S Thammasin	21	16	12
Q2	(Malaysia) Leong J H	16	21	21
(France) C Popov	21	21
PFQ	(India) B. Sai Praneeth	14	16
(India) L Sen	21	21	21
(Chinese Taipei) Wang T-w	23	15	15
PFQ	(Malaysia) Cheam J W	18	21	14
4	(China) Li SF	21	18	21

Second round
Q2	(Malaysia) Leong J H	20	21	21
(France) C Popov	22	13	19
(India) L Sen	21	21
4	(China) Li SF	17	15

Quarter-finals
Q2	(Malaysia) Leong J H	19	11
(India) L Sen	21	21

==== Section 4 ====
First round
(Thailand) K Wangcharoen	21	21
PFQ	(Spain) L E Peñalver	11	8
(Israel) M Zilberman	18	13
5	(China) Lu GZ	21	21
(Canada) B Yang	11	13
(Indonesia) C A Dwi Wardoyo	21	21
PFQ	(India) M Manjunath	21	8	15
2	(Thailand) K Vitidsarn	17	21	21

Second round
(Thailand) K Wangcharoen	21	14	22
5	(China) Lu GZ	16	21	24
(Indonesia) C A Dwi Wardoyo	21	10	20
2	(Thailand) K Vitidsarn	16	21	22

Quarter-finals
5	(China) Lu GZ	21	14	11
2	(Thailand) K Vitidsarn	18	21	21

== Women's singles ==
=== Seeds ===
1. (South Korea) An Se-young (Champion)
2. (China) Chen Yufei (withdrew)
3. (China) He Bingjiao (Final)
4. (Spain) Carolina Marín (Semi-finals)
5. (Thailand) Ratchanok Intanon (First round)
6. (China) Wang Zhiyi (Second round)
7. (China) Han Yue (Quarter-finals)
8. (Thailand) Pornpawee Chochuwong (Quarter-finals)

=== Finals ===
Semi-finals
1	(South Korea) An Se-young	21	21
4	(Spain) Carolina Marín	16	12
3	(China) He Bingjiao	21	21
(Denmark) Mia Blichfeldt	13	18

Final
1	(South Korea) An Se-young	21	21
3	(China) He Bingjiao	10	19

=== Top half ===
==== Section 1 ====
First round
1	(South Korea) An S-y	17	21	21
(Denmark) L Kjærsfeldt	21	12	16
(Malaysia) Goh J W	11	19
(Chinese Taipei) Hsu W-c	21	21
7	(China) Han Y	24	21
(South Korea) Kim G-e	22	17
PFQ	(Belgium) L Tan	21	18	7
(China) Zhang YM	19	21	21

Second round
1	(South Korea) An S-y	21	21
(Chinese Taipei) Hsu W-c	14	12
7	(China) Han Y	22	15	21
(China) Zhang YM	20	21	15

Quarter-finals
1	(South Korea) An S-y	21	21
7	(China) Han Y	16	18

==== Section 2 ====
First round
4	(Spain) C Marín	21	21
Q1	(Thailand) P Opatniput	17	13
PFR	(India) M Bansod	17	14
Q3	(India) A Chaliha	21	21
6	(China) Wang ZY	21	21
(Denmark) L Christophersen	12	15
(India) P. V. Sindhu	8	21	18
(Canada) M Li	21	18	21

Second round
4	(Spain) C Marín	21	21
Q3	(India) A Chaliha	18	13
6	(China) Wang ZY	20	17
(Canada) M Li	22	21

Quarter-finals
4	(Spain) C Marín	21	21
(Canada) M Li	19	12

=== Bottom half ===
==== Section 3 ====
First round
(Thailand) S Katethong	21	11	21
(Scotland) K Gilmour	11	21	15
(Chinese Taipei) Pai Y-p	16	18
8	(Thailand) P Chochuwong	21	21
Q4	(Canada) W Y Zhang	13	7
(India) S Nehwal	21	21
(Indonesia) P K Wardani	16	12
3	(China) He BJ	21	21

Second round
(Thailand) S Katethong	11	21	15
8	(Thailand) P Chochuwong	21	14	21
(India) S Nehwal	11	14
3	(China) He BJ	21	21

Quarter-finals
8	(Thailand) P Chochuwong	10	19
3	(China) He BJ	21	21

==== Section 4 ====
First round
(Chinese Taipei) Sung S-y	18	12
(Denmark) M Blichfeldt	21	21
Q2	(China) Gao FJ	12	21	21
5	(Thailand) R Intanon	21	17	19
(Singapore) Yeo J M	21	21
(United States) I Wang	10	8
(Japan) A Ohori	14	12
PFQ	(South Korea) Sim Y-j	21	21

Second round
(Denmark) M Blichfeldt	21	21
Q2	(China) Gao FJ	13	14
(Singapore) Yeo J M	25	12	21
PFQ	(South Korea) Sim Y-j	23	21	13

Quarter-finals
(Denmark) M Blichfeldt	21	21
(Singapore) Yeo J M	11	9

== Men's doubles ==
=== Seeds ===
1. (India) Satwiksairaj Rankireddy / Chirag Shetty (Second round)
2. (China) Liu Yuchen / Ou Xuanyi (First round)
3. (China) Liang Weikeng / Wang Chang (Champions)
4. (Malaysia) Ong Yew Sin / Teo Ee Yi (withdrew)
5. (South Korea) Choi Sol-gyu / Kim Won-ho (Semi-finals)
6. (Indonesia) Leo Rolly Carnando / Daniel Marthin (First round)
7. (Chinese Taipei) Lee Yang / Wang Chi-lin (Second round)
8. (China) He Jiting / Zhou Haodong (Second round)

=== Finals ===
Semi-finals
(Indonesia) Muhammad Shohibul Fikri (Indonesia) Bagas Maulana	22	13	21
5	(South Korea) Choi Sol-gyu (South Korea) Kim Won-ho	20	21	16
3	(China) Liang Weikeng (China) Wang Chang	21	21
(Indonesia) Marcus Fernaldi Gideon (Indonesia) Kevin Sanjaya Sukamuljo	13	19

Final
(Indonesia) Muhammad Shohibul Fikri (Indonesia) Bagas Maulana	10	15
3	(China) Liang Weikeng (China) Wang Chang	21	21

=== Top half ===
==== Section 1 ====
First round
1	(India) S Rankireddy (India) C Shetty	21	18	21
PFQ	(Denmark) R Kjær (Denmark) F Søgaard	13	21	17
PFQ	(Chinese Taipei) Chiu H-c (Chinese Taipei) Yang M-t	12	21	18
(Indonesia) M S Fikri (Indonesia) B Maulana	21	15	21
7	(Chinese Taipei) Lee Y (Chinese Taipei) Wang C-l	21	21
(Netherlands) R Jille (Netherlands) T van der Lecq	19	18
(Chinese Taipei) Lu C-y (Chinese Taipei) Yang P-h	21	21
(Chinese Taipei) Chang K-c (Chinese Taipei) Po L-w	9	19

Second round
1	(India) S Rankireddy (India) C Shetty	26	11	17
(Indonesia) M S Fikri (Indonesia) B Maulana	24	21	21
7	(Chinese Taipei) Lee Y (Chinese Taipei) Wang C-l
(Chinese Taipei) Lu C-y (Chinese Taipei) Yang P-h	w	/	o

Quarter-finals
(Indonesia) M S Fikri (Indonesia) B Maulana	21	19	21
(Chinese Taipei) Lu C-y (Chinese Taipei) Yang P-h	18	21	17

==== Section 2 ====
First round
PFQ	(Chinese Taipei) Lee F-c (Chinese Taipei) Lee F-j	16	13
(China) Ren XY (China) Tan Q	21	21
(Japan) A Endo (Japan) Y Takei	16	23	18
(Indonesia) P Kusumawardana (Indonesia) Y Rambitan	21	21	21
5	(South Korea) Choi S-g (South Korea) Kim W-h	21	21
(Chinese Taipei) Lee J-h (Chinese Taipei) Yang P-h	17	11
(Germany) M Lamsfuß (Germany) M Seidel	19	23
(Scotland) A Dunn (Scotland) A Hall	21	25

Second round
(China) Ren XY (China) Tan Q	16	21	23
(Indonesia) P Kusumawardana (Indonesia) Y Rambitan	21	7	21
5	(South Korea) Choi S-g (South Korea) Kim W-h	21	21	21
(Scotland) A Dunn (Scotland) A Hall	23	11	18

Quarter-finals
(China) Ren XY (China) Tan Q	16	14
5	(South Korea) Choi S-g (South Korea) Kim W-h	21	21

=== Bottom half ===
==== Section 3 ====
First round
(Chinese Taipei) Su C-h (Chinese Taipei) Ye H-w	21	21
(Thailand) S Jomkoh (Thailand) K Kedren	14	18
Q3	(Indonesia) S K Gutama (Indonesia) M R P Isfahani	21	20	21
6	(Indonesia) L R Carnando (Indonesia) D Marthin	16	22	16
(England) B Lane (England) S Vendy	21	19	21
Q1	(Thailand) P Sukphun (Thailand) P Teeraratsakul	15	21	10
(Japan) K Matsui (Japan) Y Takeuchi	18	17
3	(China) Liang WK (China) Wang C	21	21

Second round
(Chinese Taipei) Su C-h (Chinese Taipei) Ye H-w	13	19
Q3	(Indonesia) S K Gutama (Indonesia) M R P Isfahani	21	21
(England) B Lane (England) S Vendy	18	21	19
3	(China) Liang WK (China) Wang C	21	11	21

Quarter-finals
Q3	(Indonesia) S K Gutama (Indonesia) M R P Isfahani	21	15	12
3	(China) Liang WK (China) Wang C	16	21	21

==== Section 4 ====
First round
(Indonesia) M F Gideon (Indonesia) K S Sukamuljo	21	21
Q2	(Singapore) A Kwek (Singapore) Loh K H	18	17
(France) C Popov (France) T J Popov	6	21	15
8	(China) He JT (China) Zhou HD	21	19	21
Q4	(South Korea) Jin Y (South Korea) Na S-s	21	21
(South Korea) Kim G-j (South Korea) Kim S-r	7	16
(South Korea) Kang M-h (South Korea) Seo S-j	21	21
2	(China) Liu YC (China) Ou XY	9	17

Second round
(Indonesia) M F Gideon (Indonesia) K S Sukamuljo	22	23
8	(China) He JT (China) Zhou HD	20	21
Q4	(South Korea) Jin Y (South Korea) Na S-s	16	13
(South Korea) Kang M-h (South Korea) Seo S-j	21	21

Quarter-finals
(Indonesia) M F Gideon (Indonesia) K S Sukamuljo	17	22	21
(South Korea) Kang M-h (South Korea) Seo S-j	21	20	18

== Women's doubles ==
=== Seeds ===
1. (South Korea) Kim So-yeong / Kong Hee-yong (Champions)
2. (Indonesia) Apriyani Rahayu / Siti Fadia Silva Ramadhanti (Second round)
3. (South Korea) Baek Ha-na / Lee So-hee (Semi-finals)
4. (Thailand) Jongkolphan Kititharakul / Rawinda Prajongjai (Semi-finals)
5. (South Korea) Jeong Na-eun / Kim Hye-jeong (Quarter-finals)
6. (Thailand) Benyapa Aimsaard / Nuntakarn Aimsaard (Final)
7. (Indonesia) Febriana Dwipuji Kusuma / Amalia Cahaya Pratiwi (First round)
8. (Bulgaria) Stefani Stoeva / Gabriela Stoeva (Second round)

=== Finals ===
Semi-finals
1	(South Korea) Kim So-yeong (South Korea) Kong Hee-yong	21	21
4	(Thailand) Jongkolphan Kititharakul (Thailand) Rawinda Prajongjai	12	12
3	(South Korea) Baek Ha-na (South Korea) Lee So-hee	17	7
6	(Thailand) Benyapa Aimsaard (Thailand) Nuntakarn Aimsaard	21	21

Final
1	(South Korea) Kim So-yeong (South Korea) Kong Hee-yong	21	21
6	(Thailand) Benyapa Aimsaard (Thailand) Nuntakarn Aimsaard	13	17

=== Top half ===
==== Section 1 ====
First round
1	(South Korea) Kim S-y (South Korea) Kong H-y	21	21
(Netherlands) D Jille (Netherlands) C Seinen	12	13
(Indonesia) L T Mayasari (Indonesia) R Sugiarto	21	22
(Canada) C Choi (Canada) J Wu	15	20
7	(Indonesia) F D Kusuma (Indonesia) A C Pratiwi	14	22	19
(South Korea) Lee Y-l (South Korea) Shin S-c	21	20	21
(Japan) R Hirokami (Japan) Y Kato	21	21
(Chinese Taipei) Lee C-h (Chinese Taipei) Teng C-h	15	15

Second round
1	(South Korea) Kim S-y (South Korea) Kong H-y	21	21
(Indonesia) L T Mayasari (Indonesia) R Sugiarto	18	9
(South Korea) Lee Y-l (South Korea) Shin S-c	21	21
(Japan) R Hirokami (Japan) Y Kato	10	17

Quarter-finals
1	(South Korea) Kim S-y (South Korea) Kong H-y	15	21	21
(South Korea) Lee Y-l (South Korea) Shin S-c	21	11	7

==== Section 2 ====
First round
4	(Thailand) J Kititharakul (Thailand) R Prajongjai	21	21
PFQ	(Chinese Taipei) Chang C-h (Chinese Taipei) Yang C-t	19	18
(Denmark) M Fruergaard (Denmark) S Thygesen	w	/	o
Q1
5	(South Korea) Jeong N-e (South Korea) Kim H-j	21	18	21
(Japan) R Miyaura (Japan) A Sakuramoto	10	21	5
Q4	(Indonesia) M T Puspita Sari (Indonesia) R A Rose	21	19	11
(Malaysia) V Hoo (Malaysia) Lim C S	17	21	21

Second round
4	(Thailand) J Kititharakul (Thailand) R Prajongjai	21	21
(Denmark) M Fruergaard (Denmark) S Thygesen	12	11
5	(South Korea) Jeong N-e (South Korea) Kim H-j	21	16	21
(Malaysia) V Hoo (Malaysia) Lim C S	10	21	19

Quarter-finals
4	(Thailand) J Kititharakul (Thailand) R Prajongjai	21	21
5	(South Korea) Jeong N-e (South Korea) Kim H-j	17	14

=== Bottom half ===
==== Section 3 ====
First round
(China) Liu SS (China) Tan N	21	21
(Germany) L Efler (Germany) I Lohau	18	18
Q2	(Thailand) L Kanlaha (Thailand) P Muenwong	9	23
8	(Bulgaria) G Stoeva (Bulgaria) S Stoeva	21	25
(England) C Birch (England) L Smith	19	21	21
Q3	(Germany) S Küspert (Germany) E Moszczynski	21	19	7
(India) A Bhat (India) S Gautam	11	6
3	(South Korea) Baek H-n (South Korea) Lee S-h	21	21

Second round
(China) Liu SS (China) Tan N	21	21
8	(Bulgaria) G Stoeva (Bulgaria) S Stoeva	14	19
(England) C Birch (England) L Smith	10	21	17
3	(South Korea) Baek H-n (South Korea) Lee S-h	21	18	21

Quarter-finals
(China) Liu SS (China) Tan N	20	14
3	(South Korea) Baek H-n (South Korea) Lee S-h	22	21

==== Section 4 ====
First round
(Singapore) Jin YJ (Singapore) C Wong	10	13
(China) Li WM (China) Liu XX	21	21
(Chinese Taipei) Hsu Y-c (Chinese Taipei) Lin W-c	21	17	14
6	(Thailand) B Aimsaard (Thailand) N Aimsaard	18	21	21
(Hong Kong) Yeung N T (Hong Kong) Yeung P L	21	14	19
(Japan) R Iwanaga (Japan) K Nakanishi	10	21	21
(Scotland) J MacPherson (Scotland) C Torrance	11	12
2	(Indonesia) A Rahayu (Indonesia) S F S Ramadhanti	21	21

Second round
(China) Li WM (China) Liu XX	18	19
6	(Thailand) B Aimsaard (Thailand) N Aimsaard	21	21
(Japan) R Iwanaga (Japan) K Nakanishi	21	21
2	(Indonesia) A Rahayu (Indonesia) S F S Ramadhanti	12	13

Quarter-finals
6	(Thailand) B Aimsaard (Thailand) N Aimsaard	21	21
(Japan) R Iwanaga (Japan) K Nakanishi	17	7

== Mixed doubles ==
=== Seeds ===
1. (Thailand) Dechapol Puavaranukroh / Sapsiree Taerattanachai (Final)
2. (South Korea) Seo Seung-jae / Chae Yu-jung (First round)
3. (China) Feng Yanzhe / Huang Dongping (First round)
4. (Malaysia) Goh Soon Huat / Shevon Jemie Lai (Second round)
5. (South Korea) Kim Won-ho / Jeong Na-eun (Champions)
6. (Netherlands) Robin Tabeling / Selena Piek (Quarter-Finals)
7. (China) Jiang Zhenbang / Wei Yaxin (Second round)
8. (Thailand) Supak Jomkoh / Supissara Paewsampran (First round)

=== Finals ===
Semi-finals
1	(Thailand) Dechapol Puavaranukroh (Thailand) Sapsiree Taerattanachai	21	21
(Denmark) Mathias Christiansen (Denmark) Alexandra Bøje	10	11
5	(South Korea) Kim Won-ho (South Korea) Jeong Na-eun	15	21	21
(Chinese Taipei) Ye Hong-wei (Chinese Taipei) Lee Chia-hsin	21	15	15

Final
1	(Thailand) Dechapol Puavaranukroh (Thailand) Sapsiree Taerattanachai	21	19	20
5	(South Korea) Kim Won-ho (South Korea) Jeong Na-eun	11	21	22

=== Top half ===
==== Section 1 ====
First round
1	(Thailand) D Puavaranukroh (Thailand) S Taerattanachai	21	21
(Germany) M Lamsfuß (Germany) I Lohau	18	14
(England) G Mairs (England) J Moore	18	11
Q1	(Indonesia) A Maulana (Indonesia) N V Marwah	21	21
6	(Netherlands) R Tabeling (Netherlands) S Piek	25	21
(Canada) T A Lindeman (Canada) J Wu	23	11
(England) M Ellis (England) L Smith	8	19
(Denmark) M Thyrri (Denmark) A Magelund	21	21

Second round
1	(Thailand) D Puavaranukroh (Thailand) S Taerattanachai	21	21
Q1	(Indonesia) A Maulana (Indonesia) N V Marwah	16	11
6	(Netherlands) R Tabeling (Netherlands) S Piek	21	21
(Denmark) M Thyrri (Denmark) A Magelund	16	15

Quarter-finals
1	(Thailand) D Puavaranukroh (Thailand) S Taerattanachai	21	21
6	(Netherlands) R Tabeling (Netherlands) S Piek	16	12

==== Section 2 ====
First round
3	(China) Feng YZ (China) Huang DP	15	21	19
(Malaysia) Chen T J (Malaysia) Toh E W	21	19	21
(Japan) Y Kaneko (Japan) M Matsutomo	22	21
Q3	(Chinese Taipei) Lee J-h (Chinese Taipei) Hsu Y-c	20	18
8	(Thailand) S Jomkoh (Thailand) S Paewsampran	25	11	6
(Denmark) M Christiansen (Denmark) A Bøje	23	21	21
Q2	(Chinese Taipei) Chiu H-c (Chinese Taipei) Lin X-m	15	21	18
(Chinese Taipei) Yang P-h (Chinese Taipei) Hu L-f	21	17	21

Second round
(Malaysia) Chen T J (Malaysia) Toh E W	23	17	11
(Japan) Y Kaneko (Japan) M Matsutomo	21	21	21
(Denmark) M Christiansen (Denmark) A Bøje	20	21	21
(Chinese Taipei) Yang P-h (Chinese Taipei) Hu L-f	22	16	15

Quarter-finals
(Japan) Y Kaneko (Japan) M Matsutomo	16	11
(Denmark) M Christiansen (Denmark) A Bøje	21	21

=== Bottom half ===
==== Section 3 ====
First round
(Malaysia) Chan P S (Malaysia) Cheah Y S	15	21	22
(Singapore) T Hee (Singapore) J Tan	21	11	20
Q4	(Singapore) A Kwek (Singapore) C Wong	15	13
5	(South Korea) Kim W-h (South Korea) Jeong N-e	21	21
(Hong Kong) Tang C M (Hong Kong) Tse Y S	15	21	21
(South Korea) Ko S-h (South Korea) Eom H-w	21	16	15
(Hong Kong) Lee C H (Hong Kong) Ng T Y	21	15	15
4	(Malaysia) Goh S H (Malaysia) S J Lai	19	21	21

Second round
(Malaysia) Chan P S (Malaysia) Cheah Y S	13	17
5	(South Korea) Kim W-h (South Korea) Jeong N-e	21	21
(Hong Kong) Tang C M (Hong Kong) Tse Y S	21	21
4	(Malaysia) Goh S H (Malaysia) S J Lai	13	17

Quarter-finals
5	(South Korea) Kim W-h (South Korea) Jeong N-e	16	21	21
(Hong Kong) Tang C M (Hong Kong) Tse Y S	21	13	15

==== Section 4 ====
First round
(Chinese Taipei) Ye H-w (Chinese Taipei) Lee C-h	15	21	21
(Malaysia) Tan K M (Malaysia) Lai P J	21	16	16
(Germany) J R Jansen (Germany) L Efler	11	17
7	(China) Jiang ZB (China) Wei YX	21	21
(Japan) H Midorikawa (Japan) N Saito	21	21
(Indonesia) Z J Sumanti (Indonesia) H Julimarbela	19	12
(Scotland) A Hall (Scotland) J MacPherson	21	16	21
2	(South Korea) Seo S-j (South Korea) Chae Y-j	14	21	18

Second round
(Chinese Taipei) Ye H-w (Chinese Taipei) Lee C-h	20	21	22
7	(China) Jiang ZB (China) Wei YX	22	17	20
(Japan) H Midorikawa (Japan) N Saito	21	21
(Scotland) A Hall (Scotland) J MacPherson	16	11

Quarter-finals
(Chinese Taipei) Ye H-w (Chinese Taipei) Lee C-h	21	21
(Japan) H Midorikawa (Japan) N Saito	18	9

Preceded by 2023 Malaysia Masters	BWF World Tour; 2023 BWF season	Succeeded by 2023 Singapore Open
