= 2023 Arctic Open =

Badminton tournament in Finland

Tournament details
- Dates: 10–15 October
- Edition: 23rd
- Level: Super 500
- Total prize money: US$420,000
- Venue: Energia Areena
- Location: Vantaa, Finland

Champions
- Men's singles: (Malaysia) Lee Zii Jia
- Women's singles: (China) Han Yue
- Men's doubles: (Denmark) Kim Astrup (Denmark) Anders Skaarup Rasmussen
- Women's doubles: (China) Liu Shengshu (China) Tan Ning
- Mixed doubles: (China) Feng Yanzhe (China) Huang Dongping
- Official website: www.arcticopen.fi

The 2023 Arctic Open (officially known as the Clash of Clans Arctic Open 2023 powered by Yonex for sponsorship reasons) was a badminton tournament which took place at Energia Areena in Vantaa, Finland, from 10 to 15 October 2023 and had a total purse of $420,000.

== Tournament ==
The 2023 Arctic Open was the twenty-fourth tournament of the 2023 BWF World Tour and also part of the Arctic Open championships (previously known as Finnish Open), which had been held since 1990. This tournament was organized by Badminton Finland and sanctioned by the BWF.

=== Venue ===
This tournament was held at Energia Areena in Vantaa, Finland.

=== Point distribution ===
Below is the point distribution table for each phase of the tournament based on the BWF points system for the BWF World Tour Super 500 event.

Winner	Runner-up	3/4	5/8	9/16	17/32	33/64	65/128
9,200	7,800	6,420	5,040	3,600	2,220	880	430

=== Prize pool ===
The total prize money was US$420,000 with the distribution of the prize money in accordance with BWF regulations.

Event	Winner	Finalist	Semi-finals	Quarter-finals	Last 16
Singles	$31,500	$15,960	$6,090	$2,520	$1,470
Doubles	$33,180	$15,960	$5,880	$3,045	$1,575

== Men's singles ==
=== Seeds ===
1. (Denmark) Viktor Axelsen (withdrew)
2. (Thailand) Kunlavut Vitidsarn (First round)
3. (Denmark) Anders Antonsen (Semi-finals)
4. (China) Lu Guangzu (Quarter-finals)
5. (Chinese Taipei) Chou Tien-chen (Second round)
6. (India) Lakshya Sen (withdrew)
7. (Japan) Kanta Tsuneyama (Semi-finals)
8. (Malaysia) Lee Zii Jia (Champion)

=== Finals ===
Semi-finals
8	(Malaysia) Lee Zii Jia	21	13
3	(Denmark) Anders Antonsen	17	8^{r}
(Malaysia) Ng Tze Yong	21	21
7	(Japan) Kanta Tsuneyama	12	16

Final
8	(Malaysia) Lee Zii Jia	21	21
(Malaysia) Ng Tze Yong	14	15

=== Top half ===
==== Section 1 ====
First round
PFQ	(Malaysia) Leong J H	21	22
Q4	(Finland) J Oldorff	17	20
(Chinese Taipei) Lin C-y	13	25	16
PFQ	(France) A Merklé	21	23	21
8	(Malaysia) Lee Z J	21	21
Q3	(Denmark) M Christophersen	15	16
WC	(Finland) K Koljonen	14	16
(Indonesia) C A Dwi Wardoyo	21	21

Second round
PFQ	(Malaysia) Leong J H	15	21	21
PFQ	(France) A Merklé	21	17	19
8	(Malaysia) Lee Z J	21	18	21
(Indonesia) C A Dwi Wardoyo	17	21	11

Quarter-finals
PFQ	(Malaysia) Leong J H	16	21	7^{r}
8	(Malaysia) Lee Z J	21	19	11

==== Section 2 ====
First round
3	(Denmark) A Antonsen	w	/	o
Q2
PFQ	(India) M Manjunath	19	14
(China) Weng HY	21	21
PFQ	(Belgium) J Carraggi	14	11
(Republic of Ireland) N Nguyen	21	21
(Chinese Taipei) Wang T-w	17	21	6
(Japan) K Watanabe	21	19	21

Second round
3	(Denmark) A Antonsen	23	18	21
(China) Weng HY	21	21	16
(Republic of Ireland) N Nguyen	16	17
(Japan) K Watanabe	21	21

Quarter-finals
3	(Denmark) A Antonsen	21	22	21
(Japan) K Watanabe	9	24	14

=== Bottom half ===
==== Section 3 ====
First round
(Malaysia) Ng T Y	21	21
(Thailand) K Wangcharoen	15	16
(China) Zhao JP	21	16	23
5	(Chinese Taipei) Chou T-c	18	21	25
(France) T J Popov	22	21	15
PFQ	(India) K George	24	15	21
(Chinese Taipei) Lee C-h	16	25
4	(China) Lu GZ	21	27

Second round
(Malaysia) Ng T Y	21	21
5	(Chinese Taipei) Chou T-c	15	16
PFQ	(India) K George	10	20
4	(China) Lu GZ	21	22

Quarter-finals
(Malaysia) Ng T Y	21	21
4	(China) Lu GZ	11	18

==== Section 4 ====
First round
Q1	(Germany) M Weißkirchen	6^{r}
(India) S Kidambi	11
PFQ	(Indonesia) S H Rhustavito	19	12
7	(Japan) K Tsuneyama	21	21
PFQ	(China) Lei LX	17	21	21
(Denmark) M Johannesen	21	10	9
(France) C Popov	17	21	11
2	(Thailand) K Vitidsarn	21	12	7^{r}

Second round
(India) S Kidambi	15	12
7	(Japan) K Tsuneyama	21	21
PFQ	(China) Lei LX	21	20	21
(France) C Popov	16	22	17

Quarter-finals
7	(Japan) K Tsuneyama	21	21
PFQ	(China) Lei LX	19	12

== Women's singles ==
=== Seeds ===
1. (Chinese Taipei) Tai Tzu-ying (Quarter-finals)
2. (Thailand) Ratchanok Intanon (withdrew)
3. (China) Han Yue (Champion)
4. (United States) Beiwen Zhang (First round)
5. (China) Wang Zhiyi (Final)
6. (Thailand) Pornpawee Chochuwong (Semi-finals)
7. (Denmark) Mia Blichfeldt (Quarter-finals)
8. (India) P. V. Sindhu (Semi-finals)

=== Finals ===
Semi-finals
6	(Thailand) Pornpawee Chochuwong	22	19
3	(China) Han Yue	24	21
8	(India) P. V. Sindhu	12	21	7
5	(China) Wang Zhiyi	21	11	21

Final
3	(China) Han Yue	16	22	21
5	(China) Wang Zhiyi	21	20	12

=== Top half ===
==== Section 1 ====
First round
1	(Chinese Taipei) Tai T-y	21	21
Q3	(Estonia) C Kruus	7	11
PFQ	(India) M Bansod	10	5
(Thailand) S Katethong	21	21
6	(Thailand) P Chochuwong	21	21
(Scotland) K Gilmour	18	16
Q1	(Ukraine) P Buhrova	21	21
(Chinese Taipei) Sung S-y	11	15

Second round
1	(Chinese Taipei) Tai T-y	21	21
(Thailand) S Katethong	19	16
6	(Thailand) P Chochuwong	21	21
Q1	(Ukraine) P Buhrova	5	17

Quarter-finals
1	(Chinese Taipei) Tai T-y	19	21
6	(Thailand) P Chochuwong	21	23

==== Section 2 ====
First round
3	(China) Han Y	21	21
Q2	(Thailand) L Chaiwan	14	12
PFQ	(United States) L Lam	9	7
(Thailand) B Ongbamrungphan	21	21
7	(Denmark) M Blichfeldt	21	21
WC	(Finland) N Nyqvist	15	13
Q4	(Israel) H Neiman	7	12
(Japan) S Kawakami	21	21

Second round
3	(China) Han Y	21	21
(Thailand) B Ongbamrungphan	9	13
7	(Denmark) M Blichfeldt	21	21
(Japan) S Kawakami	14	10

Quarter-finals
3	(China) Han Y	21	13	21
7	(Denmark) M Blichfeldt	11	21	18

=== Bottom half ===
==== Section 3 ====
First round
(Denmark) L Christophersen	21	19	13
(Chinese Taipei) Hsu W-c	17	21	21
(Japan) N Okuhara	13	6
8	(India) P. V. Sindhu	21	21
(China) Zhang YM	21	21
PFQ	(Estonia) K Kuuba	19	10
(Vietnam) Nguyễn T L	17	21	24
4	(United States) BW Zhang	21	12	22

Second round
(Chinese Taipei) Hsu W-c	11	10
8	(India) P. V. Sindhu	21	21
(China) Zhang YM	17	21	14
(Vietnam) Nguyễn T L	21	13	21

Quarter-finals
8	(India) P. V. Sindhu	20	22	21
(Vietnam) Nguyễn T L	22	20	18

==== Section 4 ====
First round
(Belgium) L Tan	21	20	18
(India) A Kashyap	18	22	21
(Turkey) N Arın	13	17
5	(China) Wang ZY	21	21
(Denmark) L Kjærsfeldt	21	18	21
(Germany) Y Li	16	21	17
(Chinese Taipei) Pai Y-p	21	14	21
PFQ	(Chinese Taipei) Huang Y-h	19	21	13

Second round
(India) A Kashyap	8	12
5	(China) Wang ZY	21	21
(Denmark) L Kjærsfeldt	21	15
(Chinese Taipei) Pai Y-p	11	8^{r}

Quarter-finals
5	(China) Wang ZY	21	21
(Denmark) L Kjærsfeldt	17	11

== Men's doubles ==
=== Seeds ===
1. (India) Satwiksairaj Rankireddy / Chirag Shetty (withdrew)
2. (Malaysia) Aaron Chia / Soh Wooi Yik (First round)
3. (Malaysia) Ong Yew Sin / Teo Ee Yi (Quarter-finals)
4. (Denmark) Kim Astrup / Anders Skaarup Rasmussen (Champions)
5. (Indonesia) Mohammad Ahsan / Hendra Setiawan (Semi-finals)
6. (Indonesia) Muhammad Shohibul Fikri / Bagas Maulana (First round)
7. (Chinese Taipei) Lee Yang / Wang Chi-lin (Quarter-finals)
8. (Chinese Taipei) Lu Ching-yao / Yang Po-han (First round)

=== Finals ===
Semi-finals
5	(Indonesia) Mohammad Ahsan (Indonesia) Hendra Setiawan	19	12
4	(Denmark) Kim Astrup (Denmark) Anders Skaarup Rasmussen	21	21
(Denmark) Rasmus Kjær (Denmark) Frederik Søgaard	21	19	19
(Malaysia) Man Wei Chong (Malaysia) Tee Kai Wun	19	21	21

Final
4	(Denmark) Kim Astrup (Denmark) Anders Skaarup Rasmussen	21	21
(Malaysia) Man Wei Chong (Malaysia) Tee Kai Wun	18	17

=== Top half ===
==== Section 1 ====
First round
PFQ	(Czech Republic) O Král (Czech Republic) A Mendrek	18	21	21
PFQ	(Germany) B Geiss (Germany) J Völker	21	18	15
(United States) V Chiu (United States) J Yuan	21	21
Q3	(Germany) D Hess (Germany) P Scheiel	19	18
5	(Indonesia) M Ahsan (Indonesia) H Setiawan	21	21
PFQ	(Denmark) A Søndergaard (Denmark) J Toft	15	19
(Chinese Taipei) Lee J-h (Chinese Taipei) Yang P-hs	21	21	21
(China) Tan Q (China) Zhou HD	23	18	19

Second round
PFQ	(Czech Republic) O Král (Czech Republic) A Mendrek	21	21
(United States) V Chiu (United States) J Yuan	17	18
5	(Indonesia) M Ahsan (Indonesia) H Setiawan	21	21
(Chinese Taipei) Lee J-h (Chinese Taipei) Yang P-hs	13	19

Quarter-finals
PFQ	(Czech Republic) O Král (Czech Republic) A Mendrek	10	21	10
5	(Indonesia) M Ahsan (Indonesia) H Setiawan	21	19	21

==== Section 2 ====
First round
4	(Denmark) K Astrup (Denmark) A S Rasmussen	21	21
Q2	(United States) Chen Z-y (United States) P Smith	15	18
(Malaysia) Goh S F (Malaysia) N Izzuddin	21	21
(France) L Corvée (France) R Labar	18	8
7	(Chinese Taipei) Lee Y (Chinese Taipei) Wang C-l	21	21
(Thailand) S Jomkoh (Thailand) K Kedren	12	14
(China) He JT (China) Ren XY	21	21
(Chinese Taipei) Lee F-c (Chinese Taipei) Lee F-j	15	17

Second round
4	(Denmark) K Astrup (Denmark) A S Rasmussen	21	21
(Malaysia) Goh S F (Malaysia) N Izzuddin	14	19
7	(Chinese Taipei) Lee Y (Chinese Taipei) Wang C-l	20	21	21
(China) He JT (China) Ren XY	22	16	17

Quarter-finals
4	(Denmark) K Astrup (Denmark) A S Rasmussen	22	10	21
7	(Chinese Taipei) Lee Y (Chinese Taipei) Wang C-l	20	21	19

=== Bottom half ===
==== Section 3 ====
First round
(Denmark) R Kjær (Denmark) F Søgaard	21	21
Q4	(Republic of Ireland) J Magee (Republic of Ireland) P Reynolds	9	12
(England) B Lane (England) S Vendy	21	21
8	(Chinese Taipei) Lu C-y (Chinese Taipei) Yang P-ha	18	17
(Scotland) A Dunn (Scotland) A Hall	w	/	o
Q1
(Scotland) C Grimley (Scotland) M Grimley	11	16
3	(Malaysia) Ong Y S (Malaysia) Teo E Y	21	21

Second round
(Denmark) R Kjær (Denmark) F Søgaard	12	21	21
(England) B Lane (England) S Vendy	21	16	17
(Scotland) A Dunn (Scotland) A Hall	17	14
3	(Malaysia) Ong Y S (Malaysia) Teo E Y	21	21

Quarter-finals
(Denmark) R Kjær (Denmark) F Søgaard	16	21	21
3	(Malaysia) Ong Y S (Malaysia) Teo E Y	21	19	14

==== Section 4 ====
First round
(Denmark) D Lundgaard (Denmark) M Vestergaard	21	15	18
(China) Chen BY (China) Liu Y	18	21	21
(Indonesia) P Kusumawardana (Indonesia) Y Rambitan	21	19	22
6	(Indonesia) M S Fikri (Indonesia) B Maulana	15	21	20
(France) C Popov (France) T J Popov	19	17
(Japan) K Matsui (Japan) Y Takeuchi	21	21
(Malaysia) Man W C (Malaysia) Tee K W	21	21
2	(Malaysia) A Chia (Malaysia) Soh W Y	11	18

Second round
(China) Chen BY (China) Liu Y	22	20	13
(Indonesia) P Kusumawardana (Indonesia) Y Rambitan	20	22	21
(Japan) K Matsui (Japan) Y Takeuchi	20	22	19
(Malaysia) Man W C (Malaysia) Tee K W	22	20	21

Quarter-finals
(Indonesia) P Kusumawardana (Indonesia) Y Rambitan	20	18
(Malaysia) Man W C (Malaysia) Tee K W	22	21

== Women's doubles ==
=== Seeds ===
1. (Japan) Mayu Matsumoto / Wakana Nagahara (Semi-finals)
2. (Thailand) Jongkolphan Kititharakul / Rawinda Prajongjai (Final)
3. (Malaysia) Pearly Tan / Thinaah Muralitharan (Second round)
4. (Thailand) Benyapa Aimsaard / Nuntakarn Aimsaard (Quarter-finals)
5. (Japan) Rena Miyaura / Ayako Sakuramoto (First round)
6. (China) Li Wenmei / Liu Xuanxuan (withdrew)
7. (China) Liu Shengshu / Tan Ning (Champions)
8. (Japan) Rin Iwanaga / Kie Nakanishi (Semi-finals)

=== Finals ===
Semi-finals
1	(Japan) Mayu Matsumoto (Japan) Wakana Nagahara	18	16
7	(China) Liu Shengshu (China) Tan Ning	21	21
8	(Japan) Rin Iwanaga (Japan) Kie Nakanishi	15	14
2	(Thailand) Jongkolphan Kititharakul (Thailand) Rawinda Prajongjai	21	21

Final
7	(China) Liu Shengshu (China) Tan Ning	21	24
2	(Thailand) Jongkolphan Kititharakul (Thailand) Rawinda Prajongjai	13	22

=== Top half ===
==== Section 1 ====
First round
1	(Japan) M Matsumoto (Japan) W Nagahara	21	21
(Chinese Taipei) Hsu Y-c (Chinese Taipei) Lin W-c	14	8
(Malaysia) V Hoo (Malaysia) Lim C S	17	23	19
(Chinese Taipei) Sung S-y (Chinese Taipei) Yu C-h	21	21	21
6	(China) Li WM (China) Liu XX
(China) Li YJ (China) Luo XM	w	/	o
(Hong Kong) Yeung N T (Hong Kong) Yeung P L	23	21
(Germany) S Küspert (Germany) E Moszczynski	21	18

Second round
1	(Japan) M Matsumoto (Japan) W Nagahara	21	21
(Chinese Taipei) Sung S-y (Chinese Taipei) Yu C-h	12	16
(China) Li YJ (China) Luo XM	21	21
(Hong Kong) Yeung N T (Hong Kong) Yeung P L	14	15

Quarter-finals
1	(Japan) M Matsumoto (Japan) W Nagahara	21	21
(China) Li YJ (China) Luo XM	18	13

==== Section 2 ====
First round
4	(Thailand) B Aimsaard (Thailand) N Aimsaard	21	21
(Bulgaria) G Stoeva (Bulgaria) S Stoeva	13	19
(United States) A Xu (United States) K Xu	21	21
(Scotland) J MacPherson (Scotland) C Torrance	13	11
7	(China) Liu SS (China) Tan N	21	21
(India) R Panda (India) S Panda	9	10
(Sweden) M Sjöö (Sweden) T Sjöö	17	19
(Denmark) M Fruergaard (Denmark) S Thygesen	21	21

Second round
4	(Thailand) B Aimsaard (Thailand) N Aimsaard	21	21
(United States) A Xu (United States) K Xu	15	14
7	(China) Liu SS (China) Tan N	21	21
(Denmark) M Fruergaard (Denmark) S Thygesen	12	14

Quarter-finals
4	(Thailand) B Aimsaard (Thailand) N Aimsaard	19	19
7	(China) Liu SS (China) Tan N	21	21

=== Bottom half ===
==== Section 3 ====
First round
(Latvia) A Kupča (Latvia) J Romanova	14	15
(Germany) L Efler (Germany) I Lohau	21	21
(Estonia) C Kruus (Estonia) R Üprus	8	11
8	(Japan) R Iwanaga (Japan) K Nakanishi	21	21
(United States) P L Cao Hok (United States) L Lam	13	14
(Chinese Taipei) Lee C-h (Chinese Taipei) Teng C-h	21	21
(India) G Gopichand (India) T Jolly
3	(Malaysia) P Tan (Malaysia) Thinaah M	w	/	o

Second round
(Germany) L Efler (Germany) I Lohau	25	17
8	(Japan) R Iwanaga (Japan) K Nakanishi	27	21
(Chinese Taipei) Lee C-h (Chinese Taipei) Teng C-h	w	/	o
3	(Malaysia) P Tan (Malaysia) Thinaah M

Quarter-finals
8	(Japan) R Iwanaga (Japan) K Nakanishi	24	21
(Chinese Taipei) Lee C-h (Chinese Taipei) Teng C-h	22	16

==== Section 4 ====
First round
(France) M Lambert (France) A Tran	21	21
(Estonia) K-K Marran (Estonia) H Rüütel	16	11
(India) T Crasto (India) A Ponnappa	22	21
5	(Japan) R Miyaura (Japan) A Sakuramoto	20	19
(South Africa) A Ackerman (South Africa) D Laurens	11	10
(Malaysia) A Cheong (Malaysia) Teoh M X	21	21
(United States) F Corbett (United States) A Lee	11	11
2	(Thailand) J Kititharakul (Thailand) R Prajongjai	21	21

Second round
(France) M Lambert (France) A Tran	21	21
(India) T Crasto (India) A Ponnappa	19	16
(Malaysia) A Cheong (Malaysia) Teoh M X	13	13
2	(Thailand) J Kititharakul (Thailand) R Prajongjai	21	21

Quarter-finals
(France) M Lambert (France) A Tran	17	17
2	(Thailand) J Kititharakul (Thailand) R Prajongjai	21	21

== Mixed doubles ==
=== Seeds ===
1. (China) Feng Yanzhe / Huang Dongping (Champions)
2. (Thailand) Dechapol Puavaranukroh / Sapsiree Taerattanachai (Quarter-finals)
3. (France) Thom Gicquel / Delphine Delrue (First round)
4. (China) Jiang Zhenbang / Wei Yaxin (Final)
5. (Malaysia) Chen Tang Jie / Toh Ee Wei (Semi-finals)
6. (Denmark) Mathias Christiansen / Alexandra Bøje (Quarter-finals)
7. (Netherlands) Robin Tabeling / Selena Piek (Second round)
8. (Malaysia) Goh Soon Huat / Shevon Jemie Lai (First round)

=== Finals ===
Semi-finals
1	(China) Feng Yanzhe (China) Huang Dongping	21	21
(Japan) Hiroki Midorikawa (Japan) Natsu Saito	15	9
4	(China) Jiang Zhenbang (China) Wei Yaxin	17	21	21
5	(Malaysia) Chen Tang Jie (Malaysia) Toh Ee Wei	21	13	14

Final
1	(China) Feng Yanzhe (China) Huang Dongping	21	21
4	(China) Jiang Zhenbang (China) Wei Yaxin	14	15

=== Top half ===
==== Section 1 ====
First round
1	(China) Feng YZ (China) Huang DP	21	23
(Thailand) S Jomkoh (Thailand) S Paewsampran	16	21
Q2	(Serbia) M Tomić (Serbia) A Vitman	10	9
(Denmark) M Thyrri (Denmark) A Magelund	21	21
8	(Malaysia) Goh S H (Malaysia) S J Lai	8	19
(Hong Kong) Lee C H (Hong Kong) Ng T Y	21	21
(England) G Mairs (England) J Mairs	9	17
(Malaysia) Tan K M (Malaysia) Lai P J	21	21

Second round
1	(China) Feng YZ (China) Huang DP	21	26
(Denmark) M Thyrri (Denmark) A Magelund	16	24
(Hong Kong) Lee C H (Hong Kong) Ng T Y	21	21
(Malaysia) Tan K M (Malaysia) Lai P J	10	17

Quarter-finals
1	(China) Feng YZ (China) Huang DP	21	21
(Hong Kong) Lee C H (Hong Kong) Ng T Y	7	19

==== Section 2 ====
First round
3	(France) T Gicquel (France) D Delrue	11	21
(Indonesia) D Ferdinansyah (Indonesia) G E Widjaja	21	23
PFQ	(Germany) J Völker (Germany) S Küspert	17	18
(China) Cheng X (China) Chen FH	21	21
7	(Netherlands) R Tabeling (Netherlands) S Piek	21	21
Q4	(Scotland) A Dunn (Scotland) C Torrance	14	9
(Japan) H Midorikawa (Japan) N Saito	21	21
Q3	(India) K S Pratheek (India) T Crasto	14	18

Second round
(Indonesia) D Ferdinansyah (Indonesia) G E Widjaja	15	19
(China) Cheng X (China) Chen FH	21	21
7	(Netherlands) R Tabeling (Netherlands) S Piek	16	16
(Japan) H Midorikawa (Japan) N Saito	21	21

Quarter-finals
(China) Cheng X (China) Chen FH	13	21	18
(Japan) H Midorikawa (Japan) N Saito	21	16	21

=== Bottom half ===
==== Section 3 ====
First round
PFQ	(Denmark) M Vestergaard (Denmark) C Busch	21	21
(Scotland) A Hall (Scotland) J MacPherson	17	14
(United States) V Chiu (United States) J Gai	11	19
6	(Denmark) M Christiansen (Denmark) A Bøje	21	21
(Chinese Taipei) Lee J-h (Chinese Taipei) Hsu Y-c	21	19	21
Q1	(United States) P Smith (United States) A Lee	17	21	11
(Indonesia) P Jordan (Indonesia) M D Oktavianti	19	7
4	(China) Jiang ZB (China) Wei YX	21	21

Second round
PFQ	(Denmark) M Vestergaard (Denmark) C Busch	15	17
6	(Denmark) M Christiansen (Denmark) A Bøje	21	21
(Chinese Taipei) Lee J-h (Chinese Taipei) Hsu Y-c	12	20
4	(China) Jiang ZB (China) Wei YX	21	22

Quarter-finals
6	(Denmark) M Christiansen (Denmark) A Bøje	21	14	0^{r}
4	(China) Jiang ZB (China) Wei YX	19	21	0

==== Section 4 ====
First round
(Hong Kong) Tang C M (Hong Kong) Tse Y S	21	21
(Japan) Y Kaneko (Japan) M Matsutomo	14	15
(England) M Ellis (England) L Smith	14	17
5	(Malaysia) Chen T J (Malaysia) Toh E W	21	21
(Denmark) J Toft (Denmark) C Graversen	21	18	13
(Chinese Taipei) Ye H-w (Chinese Taipei) Lee C-h	15	21	21
(Chinese Taipei) Yang P-h (Chinese Taipei) Hu L-f	22	16	10
2	(Thailand) D Puavaranukroh (Thailand) S Taerattanachai	20	21	21

Second round
(Hong Kong) Tang C M (Hong Kong) Tse Y S	11	10
5	(Malaysia) Chen T J (Malaysia) Toh E W	21	21
(Chinese Taipei) Ye H-w (Chinese Taipei) Lee C-h	17	10
2	(Thailand) D Puavaranukroh (Thailand) S Taerattanachai	21	21

Quarter-finals
5	(Malaysia) Chen T J (Malaysia) Toh E W	21	21
2	(Thailand) D Puavaranukroh (Thailand) S Taerattanachai	14	17

Preceded by 2023 Kaohsiung Masters	BWF World Tour; 2023 BWF season	Succeeded by 2023 Denmark Open; 2023 Abu Dhabi Masters
