= Muhammad Shohibul Fikri =

Indonesian badminton player (born 1999)

Personal information
- Born: 16 November 1999 (age 27) Bandung, West Java, Indonesia
- Height: 1.76 m (5 ft 9 in)

Sport
- Country: Indonesia
- Sport: Badminton
- Handedness: Right

Men's doubles
- Highest ranking: 2 (with Fajar Alfian, 2 June 2026); 8 (with Bagas Maulana, 26 March 2024); 9 (with Daniel Marthin, 22 July 2025)
- Current ranking: 2 (with Fajar Alfian, 10 November 2026)
- BWF profile
Medal record
Men's badminton
Representing Indonesia
Sudirman Cup
Bronze medal – third place	2025 Xiamen	Mixed team
Thomas Cup
Silver medal – second place	2022 Bangkok	Men's team
Silver medal – second place	2024 Chengdu	Men's team
Asian Games
Gold medal – first place	2026 Aichi–Nagoya	Men's team
Bronze medal – third place	2026 Aichi–Nagoya	Men's doubles
Asian Championships
Bronze medal – third place	2026 Ningbo	Men's doubles
Asia Mixed Team Championships
Gold medal – first place	2025 Qingdao	Mixed team
Asia Team Championships
Silver medal – second place	2022 Selangor	Men's team
SEA Games
Gold medal – first place	2023 Cambodia	Men's team
Bronze medal – third place	2023 Cambodia	Men's doubles
Asian Junior Championships
Silver medal – second place	2017 Jakarta	Mixed team

Muhammad Shohibul Fikri (born 16 November 1999) is an Indonesian badminton player affiliated with SGS PLN Bandung club.

== Career ==
In 2018, Fikri teamed-up with Bagas Maulana, finished as runner-up at the Indonesia International. He and his partner won their first International title at the 2019 Finnish Open. He then claimed his first World Tour title at the Hyderabad Open.

In 2021, Fikri and Maulana finished as runner-up at the Belgian International defeated by their compatriots Pramudya Kusumawardana and Yeremia Rambitan in the final.

=== 2022 ===
In February, Fikri and his partner Bagas Maulana participated in Badminton Asia Team Championships with Indonesia and lost the title to Malaysia. In March, Fikri and his partner Bagas Maulana participated in 2022 All England Open for the first time. They defeated number 8 seeds Ong Yew Sin and Teo Ee Yi in the second round, the reigning world champion Takuro Hoki and Yugo Kobayashi in quarterfinals, World number 1 Marcus Fernaldi Gideon and Kevin Sanjaya Sukamuljo in the semifinals and World number 2 Mohammad Ahsan and Hendra Setiawan in the final, thus clinching their first Super 1000 title.

=== 2023 ===
Fikri and Maulana opened the 2023 season at the Malaysia Open, but were defeated in the second round by Indian pair Satwiksairaj Rankireddy and Chirag Shetty. In the next tournament, India Open, they suffered a second-round defeat to fellow Indonesian pair of Fajar Alfian and Muhammad Rian Ardianto. They competed in the home tournament, Indonesia Masters, but unfortunately lost in the quarter-finals to 2nd seed Japanese pair Takuro Hoki and Yugo Kobayashi. In the next tournament, Thailand Masters, they suffered a semi-final defeat to Chinese Taipei pair of Su Ching-heng and Ye Hong-wei.

In March, Fikri competed on the European tour, beginning with the All England Open, but lost in the quarterfinals to 1st seed fellow Indonesian pair Fajar Alfian and Muhammad Rian Ardianto. In the next tournament, they lost in the quarterfinals of Swiss Open to 3rd-seeded Malaysian pair Ong Yew Sin and Teo Ee Yi in three games. In the next tournament, they competed in the Spain Masters, but had to lose in the second round to Chinese Taipei pair Lee Fang-chih and Lee Fang-jen. In the last tournament on the European tour, they lost in the final of Orléans Masters to Chinese youngster pair Chen Boyang and Liu Yi.

In late April, Fikri competed at the Asian Championships in Dubai, United Arab Emirates, but had to lose in the quarter-finals from 4th seed Japanese pair Takuro Hoki and Yugo Kobayashi.

In May, Fikri made his debut at the Southeast Asian Games, and won the gold medal in the team event, and also won a bronze medal in the men's doubles with Maulana. In late May, Fikri competed in the second Asian tour at the Thailand Open, but had to lose in the final from 3rd seed Chinese pair Liang Weikeng and Wang Chang in straight games.

In June, Fikri and Maulana competed at the Singapore Open, but had to lose in the second round from 3rd seed Malaysian pair Aaron Chia and Soh Wooi Yik. In the next tour, they competed at the home tournament, Indonesia Open, but lost in the first round from 2nd seed Malaysian pair Aaron Chia and Soh Wooi Yik in two consecutive tour.

In July, Fikri and Maulana competed at the Korea Open, but had to lose in the first round from Korean pair Jin Yong and Na Sung-seung in only 27 minutes. In the next tour, they competed at the Japan Open, but lost in the second round against 4th seed Malaysian pair Aaron Chia and Soh Wooi Yik for the third time this season.

In late August, Fikri competed at the World Championships, but lost in the quarter-finals round from 3rd seed Chinese pair Liang Weikeng and Wang Chang in three games.

=== 2025 ===
He was selected to be part of Indonesian's team at Sudirman Cup. Partnered with Daniel Marthin, Fikri defeated Hariharan Amsakarunan and Ruban Rethinasabapathi of India, also Danish top pair Kim Astrup and Anders Skaarup Rasmussen at the group stage, leading the Indonesian team on top. Following Marthin's left knee injury, he was then played with his ex-partner Bagas Maulana, defeated Kim Won-ho and Seo Seung-jae at the semi-finals, in which the team was eventually defeated by South Korea 2–3. Fikri was paired with Fajar Alfian because Alfian's partner took a temporary leave from the tournament. The new pairing reached the quarter-finals in the Japan Open and won the China Open.

=== 2026 ===
Playing alongside his new partner, Alfian, Fikri opened the 2026 season as the runner-up at the Malaysia Open. The pair then won a bronze medal at the Asian Championships after being defeated by Kang Min-hyuk and Ki Dong-ju in the semi-finals. Together with the Indonesian men's team, he competed in the Thomas Cup, but the team was stopped in the group stage. His campaign with Alfian continued as they finished as runners-up at the Singapore Open. They then upset world number 1 pairing Kim Won-ho and Seo Seung-jae to claimed their first titles of the year at the Japan Open, and then defend their China Open title. At the World Championships in New Delhi, they were knocked out in the quarter-finals. On his Asian Games debut, he helped the Indonesian team advance to the final, where Indonesia won the gold medal in the men's team event.

== Achievements ==
=== Asian Games ===
Men's doubles
Year	Venue	Partner	Opponent	Score	Result	Ref.
2026	Ichinomiya City Municipal Gymnasium; Ichinomiya, Japan	(Indonesia) Fajar Alfian	(China) Liang Weikeng (China) Wang Chang	17–21, 21–13, 9–21	Bronze	

=== Asian Championships ===
Men's doubles
Year	Venue	Partner	Opponent	Score	Result	Ref.
2026	Ningbo Olympic Sports Center Gymnasium; Ningbo, China	(Indonesia) Fajar Alfian	(South Korea) Kang Min-hyuk (South Korea) Ki Dong-ju	13–21, 21–14, 16–21	Bronze	

=== SEA Games ===
Men's doubles
Year	Venue	Partner	Opponent	Score	Result	Ref.
2023	Morodok Techo Badminton Hall; Phnom Penh, Cambodia	(Indonesia) Bagas Maulana	(Thailand) Peeratchai Sukphun (Thailand) Pakkapon Teeraratsakul	12–21, 19–21	Bronze	

=== BWF World Tour (6 titles, 12 runners-up) ===
The BWF World Tour, which was announced on 19 March 2017 and implemented in 2018, is a series of elite badminton tournaments sanctioned by the Badminton World Federation (BWF). The BWF World Tours are divided into levels of World Tour Finals, Super 1000, Super 750, Super 500, Super 300, and the BWF Tour Super 100.

Men's doubles
Year	Tournament	Level	Partner	Opponent	Score	Result	Ref.
2019	Hyderabad Open	Super 100	(Indonesia) Bagas Maulana	(South Korea) Na Sung-seung (South Korea) Wang Chan	21–18, 21–18	(gold) Winner	
2022	All England Open	Super 1000	(Indonesia) Bagas Maulana	(Indonesia) Mohammad Ahsan (Indonesia) Hendra Setiawan	21–19, 21–13	(gold) Winner	
2023	Orléans Masters	Super 300	(Indonesia) Bagas Maulana	(China) Chen Boyang (China) Liu Yi	19–21, 17–21	(silver) Runner-up	
2023	Thailand Open	Super 500	(Indonesia) Bagas Maulana	(China) Liang Weikeng (China) Wang Chang	10–21, 15–21	(silver) Runner-up	
2023	Denmark Open	Super 750	(Indonesia) Bagas Maulana	(Malaysia) Aaron Chia (Malaysia) Soh Wooi Yik	13–21, 17–21	(silver) Runner-up	
2023	French Open	Super 750	(Indonesia) Bagas Maulana	(Denmark) Kim Astrup (Denmark) Anders Skaarup Rasmussen	14–21, 21–10, 18–21	(silver) Runner-up	
2024	Swiss Open	Super 300	(Indonesia) Bagas Maulana	(England) Ben Lane (England) Sean Vendy	22–24, 26–28	(silver) Runner-up	
2025	Thailand Masters	Super 300	(Indonesia) Daniel Marthin	(South Korea) Jin Yong (South Korea) Seo Seung-jae	18–21, 17–21	(silver) Runner-up	
2025	Swiss Open	Super 300	(Indonesia) Daniel Marthin	(Thailand) Kittinupong Kedren (Thailand) Dechapol Puavaranukroh	15–21, 21–18, 14–21	(silver) Runner-up	
2025	China Open	Super 1000	(Indonesia) Fajar Alfian	(Malaysia) Aaron Chia (Malaysia) Soh Wooi Yik	21–15, 21–14	(gold) Winner	
2025	Korea Open	Super 500	(Indonesia) Fajar Alfian	(South Korea) Kim Won-ho (South Korea) Seo Seung-jae	16–21, 21–23	(silver) Runner-up	
2025	Denmark Open	Super 750	(Indonesia) Fajar Alfian	(Japan) Takuro Hoki (Japan) Yugo Kobayashi	18–21, 21–15, 19–21	(silver) Runner-up	
2025	French Open	Super 750	(Indonesia) Fajar Alfian	(South Korea) Kim Won-ho (South Korea) Seo Seung-jae	21–10, 13–21, 12–21	(silver) Runner-up	
2025	Australian Open	Super 500	(Indonesia) Fajar Alfian	(Indonesia) Raymond Indra (Indonesia) Nikolaus Joaquin	20–22, 21–10, 18–21	(silver) Runner-up	
2026	Singapore Open	Super 750	(Indonesia) Fajar Alfian	(India) Satwiksairaj Rankireddy (India) Chirag Shetty	21–18, 17–21, 16–21	(silver) Runner-up	
2026	Japan Open	Super 750	(Indonesia) Fajar Alfian	(South Korea) Kim Won-ho (South Korea) Seo Seung-jae	21–19, 21–17	(gold) Winner	
2026	China Open	Super 1000	(Indonesia) Fajar Alfian	(South Korea) Kim Won-ho (South Korea) Seo Seung-jae	16–21, 21–19, 21–19	(gold) Winner	
2026	Denmark Open	Super 750	(Indonesia) Fajar Alfian	(Malaysia) Aaron Chia (Malaysia) Soh Wooi Yik	21–8, 21–11	(gold) Winner	

=== BWF International Challenge/Series (1 title, 2 runners-up) ===
Men's doubles
Year	Tournament	Partner	Opponent	Score	Result	Ref.
2018	Indonesia International	(Indonesia) Bagas Maulana	(Indonesia) Sabar Karyaman Gutama (Indonesia) Frengky Wijaya Putra	16–21, 15–21	(silver) Runner-up	
2019	Finnish Open	(Indonesia) Bagas Maulana	(Germany) Jones Ralfy Jansen (Germany) Peter Käsbauer	21–17, 21–17	(gold) Winner	
2021	Belgian International	(Indonesia) Bagas Maulana	(Indonesia) Pramudya Kusumawardana (Indonesia) Yeremia Rambitan	18–21, 20–22	(silver) Runner-up	

BWF International Challenge tournament
BWF International Series tournament

== Performance timeline ==
Key

W	Won	F	Finalist	SF	Semi-finalist
QF	Quarter-finalist	#R	Rounds 4, 3, 2, 1	RR	Round-robin stage
Q#	Qualification round	A	Absent	w/d	Withdrew
G	Gold	S	Silver	B	Bronze
NH	Not held	N/A	Not applicable	DNQ	Did not qualify

=== National team ===
- Junior level

Team events	2017
Asian Junior Championships	S
World Junior Championships	5th

- Senior level

Team events	2022	2023	2024	2025	2026	Ref
SEA Games	NH	G	NH	A	NH	
Asia Team Championships	S	NH	QF	NH		
Asia Mixed Team Championships	NH	A	NH	G	NH	
Asian Games	A	NH			G	
Thomas Cup	S	NH	S	NH	GS	
Sudirman Cup	NH	A	NH	B	NH	

=== Individual competitions ===
- Junior level

Events	2017
Asian Junior Championships	QF
World Junior Championships	4R

- Senior level

Events	2022	2023	2024	2025	2026	Ref
SEA Games	NH	B	NH	A	NH	
Asian Championships	1R	QF	1R	QF	B	
Asian Games	A	NH			B	
World Championships	2R	QF	NH	DNQ	QF	

Tournament	BWF World Tour									Best	Ref
Tournament	2018	2019	2020	2021	2022	2023	2024	2025	2026	Best	Ref
Malaysia Open	A		NH		2R	2R	1R	A	SF	SF ('26)	
India Open	A		NH		A	2R	1R	A		2R ('23)	
Indonesia Masters	A		Q1	2R	1R	QF	QF	2R	QF	QF ('23, '24, '26)	
Thailand Masters	A	1R	2R	NH		SF	SF	F	A	F ('25)	
All England Open	A				W	QF	QF	2R	2R	W ('22)	
Swiss Open	A		NH	1R	1R	QF	F	F	A	F ('24, '25)	
Orléans Masters	A	2R	NH	A		F	A			F ('23)	
Thailand Open	A		1R	NH	2R	F	2R	A		F ('23)	
Thailand Open	A		2R	NH	2R	F	2R	A		F ('23)	
Malaysia Masters	A			NH	1R	A				1R ('22)	
Singapore Open	A		NH		1R	2R	2R	A	F	F ('26)	
Indonesia Open	A		NH	2R	2R	1R	QF	A	1R	QF ('24)	
Australian Open	A		NH		A			F	w/d	F ('25)	
Macau Open	A		NH				2R	A		2R ('24)	
Japan Open	A		NH		2R	2R	SF	QF	W	W ('26)	
China Open	A		NH			QF	SF	W	W	W ('25, 26)	
Korea Masters	A		NH		QF	A	2R	A		QF ('22)	
China Masters	A		NH			1R	1R	SF	w/d	SF ('25)	
Indonesia Masters Super 100	2R	1R	NH		A					2R ('18)	
Vietnam Open	Q2	QF	NH		A					QF ('19)	
Arctic Open	N/A		NH			1R	A			1R ('23)	
Denmark Open	A			QF	2R	F	A	F	W	W ('26)	
French Open	A		NH	A	QF	F	1R	F	1R	F ('23, '25)	
Hylo Open	A			2R	1R	A		QF	A	QF ('25)	
Korea Open	A		NH		SF	1R	SF	F	A	F ('25)	
Japan Masters	NH					1R	QF	A	1R	QF ('24)	
Hong Kong Open	A		NH			2R	QF	A	2R	QF ('24)	
World Tour Finals	DNQ					RR	DNQ	RR	Q	RR ('23, '25)	
Hyderabad Open	A	W	NH							W ('19)	
New Zealand Open	A	1R	NH							1R ('19)	
Russian Open	A	2R	NH							2R ('19)	
Spain Masters	A		2R	QF	NH	2R	A	NH		QF ('21)	
Year-end ranking	154	57	48	29	12	9	17	6		3	
Tournament	2018	2019	2020	2021	2022	2023	2024	2025	2026	Best	Ref
