= Bagas Maulana =

Indonesian badminton player (born 1998)

Personal information
- Born: 20 July 1998 (age 28) Cilacap, Central Java, Indonesia
- Height: 1.82 m (6 ft 0 in)

Sport
- Country: Indonesia
- Sport: Badminton
- Handedness: Right

Men's & mixed doubles
- Highest ranking: 8 (MD with Muhammad Shohibul Fikri, 26 March 2024); 9 (MD with Leo Rolly Carnando, 15 April 2025)
- Current ranking: 30 (MD with Leo Rolly Carnando); 242 (XD with Indah Cahya Sari Jamil (8 September 2026)
- BWF profile
Medal record
Men's badminton
Representing Indonesia
Sudirman Cup
Bronze medal – third place	2025 Xiamen	Mixed team
Thomas Cup
Silver medal – second place	2022 Bangkok	Men's team
Silver medal – second place	2024 Chengdu	Men's team
Asian Championships
Bronze medal – third place	2025 Ningbo	Men's doubles
Asia Team Championships
Silver medal – second place	2022 Selangor	Men's team
Bronze medal – third place	2026 Qingdao	Men's team
SEA Games
Gold medal – first place	2023 Cambodia	Men's team
Gold medal – first place	2025 Thailand	Men's team
Bronze medal – third place	2023 Cambodia	Men's doubles
Bronze medal – third place	2025 Thailand	Men's doubles

Bagas Maulana (born 20 July 1998) is an Indonesian badminton player affiliated with Djarum club.

== Career ==
In the junior event, Maulana won a boys' doubles Junior Grand Prix title in 2016 partnered with Muhammad Fachrikar.

In 2018, Maulana teamed-up with Muhammad Shohibul Fikri, finished as runner-up at the Indonesia International. He and his partner won their first International title at the 2019 Finnish Open. He then claimed his first World Tour title at the Hyderabad Open.

In 2021, Maulana and Fikri finished as runner-up at the Belgian International defeated by their compatriots Pramudya Kusumawardana and Yeremia Rambitan in the final.

=== 2022 ===
In February, Maulana and his partner Muhammad Shohibul Fikri participated in Badminton Asia Team Championships with Indonesia and lost the title to Malaysia. In March, he and his partner Muhammad Shohibul Fikri participated in 2022 All England Open for the first time. They defeated number 8 seeds Ong Yew Sin and Teo Ee Yi in the second round, the reigning world champion Takuro Hoki and Yugo Kobayashi in quarterfinals, World number 1 Marcus Fernaldi Gideon and Kevin Sanjaya Sukamuljo in the semifinals and World number 2 Mohammad Ahsan and Hendra Setiawan in the final, thus clinching their first Super 1000 title.

=== 2023 ===
Maulana and his partner Fikri did not win any individual titles in 2023. Their best results were the finalists in the Orléans Masters, Thailand Open, Denmark Open, and at the French Open. They also reached the semi-finals in the Thailand Masters, the quarter-finals in the Indonesia Masters, All England Open, Swiss Open, Asian Championships, and the World Championships. The only result that brought them to the top of the podium was winning the gold medal at the SEA Games together with the Indonesian men's team, while in the men's doubles, he and his partner won the bronze medal. The bad results they experienced were being eliminated in the early rounds at the Malaysia Open, India Open, Spain Masters, Singapore Open, Indonesia Open, Korea Open, and at the Japan Open.

=== 2025–2026 ===
Kicked off the 2025 season in the home soil Indonesia Masters, Maulana with his partner Carnando were crushed in the first round. They then reached the quarter-finals in the Thailand Masters and also the semi-finals in the All England Open both losing to Seo Seung-jae with different partner. Maulana then clinched his first medal at the Asian Championships by winning the bronze in the men's doubles with Carnando. He competed at the SEA Games, captured the gold medal in the team event, and a bronze in the men's doubles with Carnando.

In 2026, Maulana and his partner Carnando, secured their second title at the Thailand Masters, waited approximately 17 months after their first title as a pair in the 2024 Korea Open.

== Achievements ==
=== Asian Championships ===
Men's doubles
Year	Venue	Partner	Opponent	Score	Result	Ref.
2025	Ningbo Olympic Sports Center Gymnasium; Ningbo, China	(Indonesia) Leo Rolly Carnando	(China) Chen Boyang (China) Liu Yi	21–13, 18–21, 12–21	Bronze	

=== SEA Games ===
Men's doubles
Year	Venue	Partner	Opponent	Score	Result	Ref.
2023	Morodok Techo Badminton Hall; Phnom Penh, Cambodia	(Indonesia) Muhammad Shohibul Fikri	(Thailand) Peeratchai Sukphun (Thailand) Pakkapon Teeraratsakul	12–21, 19–21	Bronze	
2025	Gymnasium 4 Thammasat University Rangsit Campus; Pathum Thani, Thailand	(Indonesia) Leo Rolly Carnando	(Malaysia) Aaron Chia (Malaysia) Soh Wooi Yik	16–21, 17–21	Bronze	

=== BWF World Tour (4 titles, 6 runners-up) ===
The BWF World Tour, which was announced on 19 March 2017 and implemented in 2018, is a series of elite badminton tournaments sanctioned by the Badminton World Federation (BWF). The BWF World Tours are divided into levels of World Tour Finals, Super 1000, Super 750, Super 500, Super 300, and the BWF Tour Super 100.

Men's doubles
Year	Tournament	Level	Partner	Opponent	Score	Result	Ref.
2019	Hyderabad Open	Super 100	(Indonesia) Muhammad Shohibul Fikri	(South Korea) Na Sung-seung (South Korea) Wang Chan	21–18, 21–18	(gold) Winner	
2022	All England Open	Super 1000	(Indonesia) Muhammad Shohibul Fikri	(Indonesia) Mohammad Ahsan (Indonesia) Hendra Setiawan	21–19, 21–13	(gold) Winner	
2023	Orléans Masters	Super 300	(Indonesia) Muhammad Shohibul Fikri	(China) Chen Boyang (China) Liu Yi	19–21, 17–21	(silver) Runner-up	
2023	Thailand Open	Super 500	(Indonesia) Muhammad Shohibul Fikri	(China) Liang Weikeng (China) Wang Chang	10–21, 15–21	(silver) Runner-up	
2023	Denmark Open	Super 750	(Indonesia) Muhammad Shohibul Fikri	(Malaysia) Aaron Chia (Malaysia) Soh Wooi Yik	13–21, 17–21	(silver) Runner-up	
2023	French Open	Super 750	(Indonesia) Muhammad Shohibul Fikri	(Denmark) Kim Astrup (Denmark) Anders Skaarup Rasmussen	14–21, 21–10, 18–21	(silver) Runner-up	
2024	Swiss Open	Super 300	(Indonesia) Muhammad Shohibul Fikri	(England) Ben Lane (England) Sean Vendy	22–24, 26–28	(silver) Runner-up	
2024	Korea Open	Super 500	(Indonesia) Leo Rolly Carnando	(South Korea) Kang Min-hyuk (South Korea) Seo Seung-jae	18–21, 21–9, 21–8	(gold) Winner	
2025	All England Open	Super 1000	(Indonesia) Leo Rolly Carnando	(South Korea) Kim Won-ho (South Korea) Seo Seung-jae	19–21, 19–21	(silver) Runner-up	
2026	Thailand Masters	Super 300	(Indonesia) Leo Rolly Carnando	(Indonesia) Raymond Indra (Indonesia) Nikolaus Joaquin	21–10, 21–17	(gold) Winner	

=== BWF International Challenge/Series (1 title, 3 runners-up) ===
Men's doubles
Year	Tournament	Partner	Opponent	Score	Result	Ref.
2018	Indonesia International	(Indonesia) Muhammad Shohibul Fikri	(Indonesia) Sabar Karyaman Gutama (Indonesia) Frengky Wijaya Putra	16–21, 15–21	(silver) Runner-up	
2019	Finnish Open	(Indonesia) Muhammad Shohibul Fikri	(Germany) Jones Ralfy Jansen (Germany) Peter Käsbauer	21–17, 21–17	(gold) Winner	
2021	Belgian International	(Indonesia) Muhammad Shohibul Fikri	(Indonesia) Pramudya Kusumawardana (Indonesia) Yeremia Rambitan	18–21, 20–22	(silver) Runner-up	

Mixed doubles
Year	Tournament	Partner	Opponent	Score	Result	Ref.
2026 (II)	Indonesia International	(Indonesia) Apriyani Rahayu	(Indonesia) Rehan Naufal Kusharjanto (Indonesia) Melati Daeva Oktavianti	19–21, 15–21	(silver) Runner-up	

BWF International Challenge tournament
BWF International Series tournament

=== BWF Junior International (1 title) ===
Boys' doubles
Year	Tournament	Partner	Opponent	Score	Result	Ref.
2016	Jaya Raya Junior International	(Indonesia) Muhammad Fachrikar	(Indonesia) Andika Ramadiansyah (Indonesia) Rinov Rivaldy	21–19, 14–21, 21–18	(gold) Winner	

BWF Junior International Grand Prix tournament
BWF Junior International Challenge tournament
BWF Junior International Series tournament
BWF Junior Future Series tournament

== Performance timeline ==
Key

W	Won	F	Finalist	SF	Semi-finalist
QF	Quarter-finalist	#R	Rounds 4, 3, 2, 1	RR	Round-robin stage
Q#	Qualification round	A	Absent	w/d	Withdrew
G	Gold	S	Silver	B	Bronze
NH	Not held	N/A	Not applicable	DNQ	Did not qualify

=== National team ===
- Junior level

Team events	2016
Asian Junior Championships	QF
World Junior Championships	5th

- Senior level

Team events	2022	2023	2024	2025	2026	Ref
SEA Games	NH	G	NH	G	NH	
Asia Team Championships	S	NH	QF	NH	B	
Thomas Cup	S	NH	S	NH		
Sudirman Cup	NH	A	NH	B	NH	

=== Individual competitions ===
==== Junior level ====
Events	2016
Asian Junior Championships	1R
World Junior Championships	3R

==== Senior level ====
===== Men's doubles =====
Events	2022	2023	2024	2025	Ref
SEA Games	NH	B	NH	B	
Asian Championships	1R	QF	1R	B	
World Championships	2R	QF	NH	3R	

Tournament	BWF Superseries / Grand Prix			BWF World Tour									Best	Ref
Tournament	2015	2016	2017	2018	2019	2020	2021	2022	2023	2024	2025	2026	Best	Ref
Malaysia Open	A					NH		2R	2R	1R	A		2R ('22, '23)	
India Open	A					NH		A	2R	1R	A		2R ('23)	
Indonesia Masters	Q1	Q2	NH	A		Q1	2R	1R	QF	QF	1R	2R	QF ('23, '24)	
Thailand Masters	NH	A			1R	2R	NH		SF	SF	QF	W	W ('26)	
All England Open	A							W	QF	QF	F	1R	W ('22)	
Swiss Open	A					NH	1R	1R	QF	F	2R	2R	F ('24)	
Orléans Masters	N/A			A	2R	NH	A		F	A		SF	F ('23)	
Thailand Open	A					1R	NH	2R	F	2R	A	1R	F ('23)	
Thailand Open	A					2R	NH	2R	F	2R	A	1R	F ('23)	
Malaysia Masters	A						NH	1R	A			1R	1R ('22, '26)	
Singapore Open	A					NH		1R	2R	2R	1R	A	2R ('23, '24)	
Indonesia Open	A	1R	1R	A		NH	2R	2R	1R	QF	1R	A	QF ('24)	
Australian Open	A					NH		A				1R	1R ('26)	
Macau Open	A					NH				A		1R	1R ('26)	
Japan Open	A					NH		2R	2R	SF	1R	A	SF ('24)	
China Open	A					NH			QF	2R	2R	A	QF ('23)	
Korea Masters	A					NH		QF	A				QF ('22)	
China Masters	A					NH			1R	1R	QF	A	QF ('25)	
Indonesia Masters Super 100	N/A			2R	1R	NH		A					2R ('18)	
Vietnam Open	A			Q2	QF	NH		A					QF ('19)	
Arctic Open	N/A					NH			1R	1R	A		1R ('23, '24)	
Denmark Open	A						QF	2R	F	2R	1R	A	F ('23)	
French Open	A					NH	A	QF	F	1R	1R	A	F ('23)	
Hylo Open	A						2R	1R	A		2R		2R ('21, '25)	
Korea Open	A					NH		SF	1R	W	1R		W ('24)	
Japan Masters	NH								1R	SF	A		SF ('24)	
Hong Kong Open	A					NH			2R	SF	2R		SF ('24)	
Superseries / World Tour Finals	DNQ								RR	DNQ			RR ('23)	
Hyderabad Open	NH			2R	W	NH							W ('19)	
New Zealand Open	A				1R	NH							1R ('19)	
Russian Open	A				2R	NH							2R ('19)	
Spain Masters	NH			A		2R	QF	NH	2R	A	NH		QF ('21)	
Year-end ranking	1198	216	143	154	57	48	29	12	9	17	19		8	
Tournament	2015	2016	2017	2018	2019	2020	2021	2022	2023	2024	2025	2026	Best	Ref

===== Mixed doubles =====
Tournament	BWF World Tour	Best	Ref
Tournament	2026	Best	Ref
Indonesia Masters Super 100	QF	QF ('26 I)	
Indonesia Masters Super 100	2R	QF ('26 I)	
Malaysia Super 100	2R	2R ('26)	
Syed Modi International	Q	('26)	
