= 2017 Badminton Asia Junior Championships =

Tournament details
- Dates: 22–30 July 2017
- Edition: 20
- Venue: Jaya Raya Sports Hall Training Center
- Location: South Tangerang, Indonesia

The 2017 Badminton Asia Junior Championships is the 20th edition of the Asia continental junior championships to crown the best U-19 badminton players across Asia. This tournament was held in South Tangerang, Indonesia, between 22 and 30 July 2017. There were 23 countries across Asia competing in this tournament.

== Venue ==
This tournament was held at Jaya Raya Sports Hall Training Center.

== Medalists ==
In the mixed team event, South Korea team clinched the gold medal after upset the host country Indonesia with the score 3–2. Japan and Malaysia share the bronze medals after lose in the semi-final match. In the individual event, China won 2 golds in the girls' singles and boys' doubles. Malaysia, South Korea, and Indonesia won a gold in boys' singles, girls' doubles and mixed doubles respectively.

Event	Gold	Silver	Bronze
Teams	South Korea; Kang Min-hyuk; Kim Moon-jun; Lee Sang-min; Na Sung-seung; Park Hyeon-seung; Shin Tae-yang; Wang Chan; Woo Seung-hoon; An Se-young; Baek Ha-na; Kim Min-ji; Kim Seong-min; Lee Yu-rim; Park Ga-eun; Seong Ah-yeong; Sim Yu-jin	Indonesia; Gatjra Piliang Fiqihilahi Cupu; Muhammad Shohibul Fikri; Rehan Naufal Kusharjanto; Adnan Maulana; Ghifari Anandaffa Prihardika; Rinov Rivaldy; Ikhsan Rumbay; Yeremia Rambitan; Agatha Imanuela; Serena Kani; Siti Fadia Silva Ramadhanti; Jauza Fadhila Sugiarto; Ribka Sugiarto; Gregoria Mariska Tunjung; Aurum Oktavia Winata; Angelica Wiratama	Japan; Mahiro Kaneko; Yunosuke Kubota; Hiroki Midorikawa; Hiroki Nakayama; Kodai Naraoka; Takuma Obayashi; Rin Iwanaga; Hirari Mizui; Natsu Saito; Yui Suizu; Moe Yamaguchi
Teams	South Korea; Kang Min-hyuk; Kim Moon-jun; Lee Sang-min; Na Sung-seung; Park Hyeon-seung; Shin Tae-yang; Wang Chan; Woo Seung-hoon; An Se-young; Baek Ha-na; Kim Min-ji; Kim Seong-min; Lee Yu-rim; Park Ga-eun; Seong Ah-yeong; Sim Yu-jin	Indonesia; Gatjra Piliang Fiqihilahi Cupu; Muhammad Shohibul Fikri; Rehan Naufal Kusharjanto; Adnan Maulana; Ghifari Anandaffa Prihardika; Rinov Rivaldy; Ikhsan Rumbay; Yeremia Rambitan; Agatha Imanuela; Serena Kani; Siti Fadia Silva Ramadhanti; Jauza Fadhila Sugiarto; Ribka Sugiarto; Gregoria Mariska Tunjung; Aurum Oktavia Winata; Angelica Wiratama	Malaysia; Chang Yee Jun; Chia Wei Jie; Kwek Yee Jian; Leong Jun Hao; Man Wei Chong; Ng Eng Cheong; Ng Tze Yong; Sim Fong Hau; Eoon Qi Xuan; Goh Jin Wei; Lim Mei Chen; Ng Wan Win; Pearly Tan; Tan Sueh Jeou; Toh Ee Wei; Yap Ling
Boys' singles	(Malaysia) Leong Jun Hao	(China) Bai Yupeng	(Chinese Taipei) Chen Chi-ting
Boys' singles	(Malaysia) Leong Jun Hao	(China) Bai Yupeng	(Thailand) Kunlavut Vitidsarn
Girls' singles	(China) Han Yue	(Thailand) Phittayaporn Chaiwan	(Malaysia) Eoon Qi Xuan
Girls' singles	(China) Han Yue	(Thailand) Phittayaporn Chaiwan	(Singapore) Yeo Jia Min
Boys' doubles	(China) Di Zijian (China) Wang Chang	(South Korea) Lee Sung-min (South Korea) Na Sung-seung	(Malaysia) Chia Wei Jie (Malaysia) Ng Tze Yong
Boys' doubles	(China) Di Zijian (China) Wang Chang	(South Korea) Lee Sung-min (South Korea) Na Sung-seung	(South Korea) Shin Tae-yang (South Korea) Wang Chan
Girls' doubles	(South Korea) Baek Ha-na (South Korea) Lee Yu-rim	(China) Liu Xuanxuan (China) Xia Yuting	(Indonesia) Agatha Imanuela (Indonesia) Siti Fadia Silva Ramadhanti
Girls' doubles	(South Korea) Baek Ha-na (South Korea) Lee Yu-rim	(China) Liu Xuanxuan (China) Xia Yuting	(Indonesia) Jauza Fadhila Sugiarto (Indonesia) Ribka Sugiarto
Mixed doubles	(Indonesia) Rehan Naufal Kusharjanto (Indonesia) Siti Fadia Silva Ramadhanti	(South Korea) Na Sung-seung (South Korea) Seong Ah-yeong	(South Korea) Kang Min-hyuk (South Korea) Baek Ha-na
Mixed doubles	(Indonesia) Rehan Naufal Kusharjanto (Indonesia) Siti Fadia Silva Ramadhanti	(South Korea) Na Sung-seung (South Korea) Seong Ah-yeong	(South Korea) Wang Chan (South Korea) Kim Min-ji

== Team competition ==
=== Final round ===
South Korea
3
South Tangerang, Indonesia
July 25, 2017

Indonesia
2

			1	2	3
1	(South Korea) (Indonesia)	Na Sung-seung / Seong Ah-yeong; Rinov Rivaldy / Siti Fadia Silva Ramadhanti	19; 21	21; 18	21; 23
2	(South Korea) (Indonesia)	Woo Seung-hoon; Ikhsan Rumbay	22; 24	21; 10	21; 8
3	(South Korea) (Indonesia)	Kang Min-hyuk / Kim Moon-jun; Muhammad Shohibul Fikri / Adnan Maulana	21; 18	19; 21	16; 21
4	(South Korea) (Indonesia)	An Se-young; Gregoria Mariska Tunjung	21; 19	7; 21	22; 20
5	(South Korea) (Indonesia)	Kim Min-ji / Lee Yu-rim; Agatha Imanuela / Siti Fadia Silva Ramadhanti	21; 19	21; 13

== Medal table ==
Rank	Nation	Gold	Silver	Bronze	Total
1	South Korea	2	2	3	7
2	China	2	2	0	4
3	Indonesia*	1	1	2	4
4	Malaysia	1	0	3	4
5	Thailand	0	1	1	2
6	Chinese Taipei	0	0	1	1
6	Japan	0	0	1	1
6	Singapore	0	0	1	1
Totals (8 entries)		6	6	12	24
