= Ng Tze Yong =

Malaysian badminton player (born 2000)

Ng Tze Yong 黄智勇
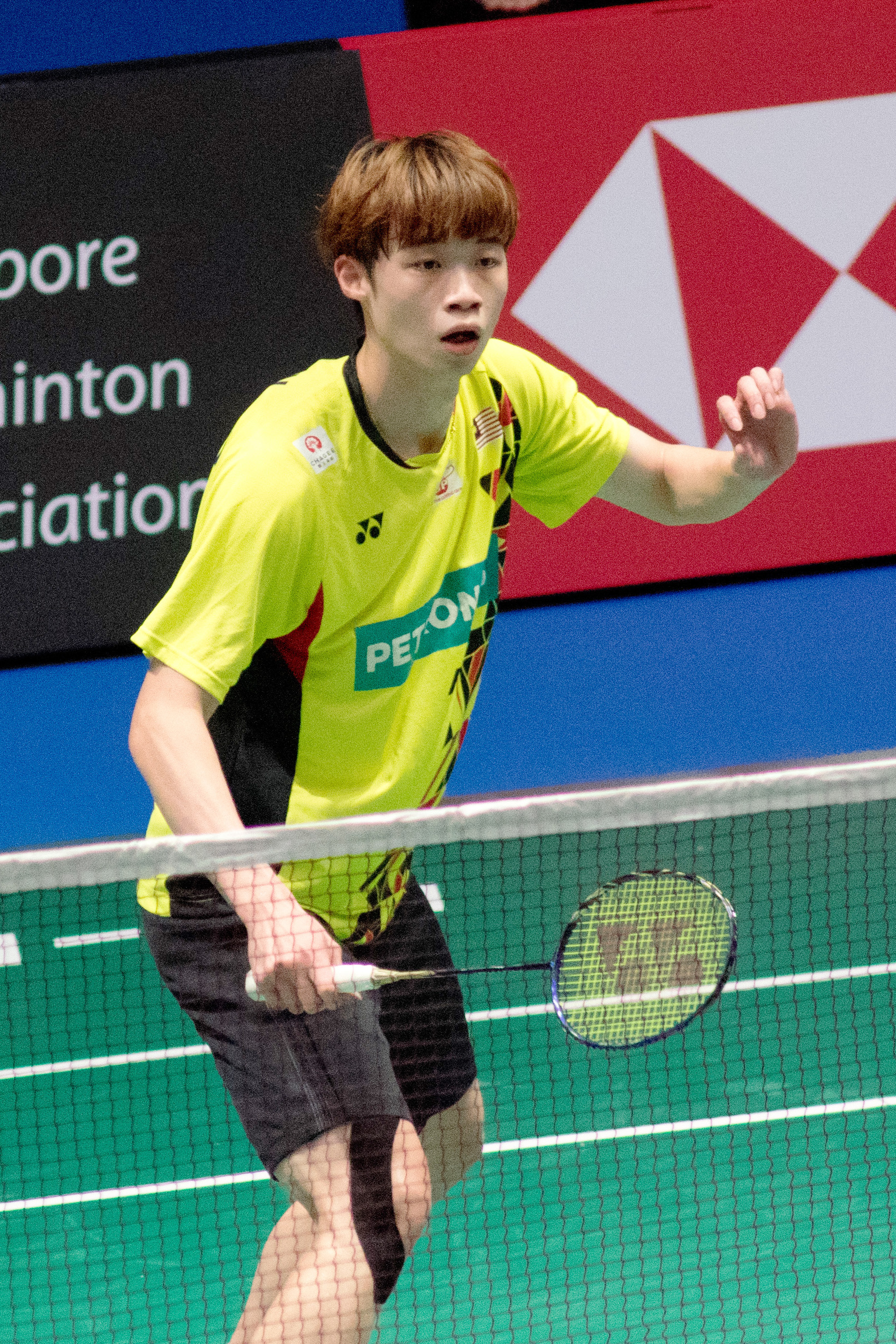
- Ng in 2022

Personal information
- Born: 16 May 2000 (age 26) Johor Bahru, Johor, Malaysia
- Years active: 2019–present
- Height: 1.80 m (5 ft 11 in)

Sport
- Country: Malaysia
- Sport: Badminton
- Handedness: Right
- Coached by: Soong Joo Ven

Men's singles
- Career record: 149 wins, 73 losses
- Highest ranking: 14 (21 November 2023)
- BWF profile
Medal record
Men's badminton
Representing Malaysia
Sudirman Cup
Bronze medal – third place	2021 Vantaa	Mixed team
Bronze medal – third place	2023 Suzhou	Mixed team
Commonwealth Games
Gold medal – first place	2022 Birmingham	Mixed team
Silver medal – second place	2022 Birmingham	Men's singles
Asia Team Championships
Gold medal – first place	2022 Selangor	Men's team
Silver medal – second place	2020 Manila	Men's team
Silver medal – second place	2024 Selangor	Men's team
World Junior Championships
Silver medal – second place	2017 Yogyakarta	Mixed team
Asian Junior Championships
Bronze medal – third place	2017 Jakarta	Boys' doubles
Bronze medal – third place	2017 Jakarta	Mixed team
Bronze medal – third place	2018 Jakarta	Mixed team

Ng Tze Yong (Chinese: 黃智勇; pinyin: Huáng Zhìyǒng; born 16 May 2000) is a Malaysian badminton player. Ng won a bronze medal at the 2021 Sudirman Cup. He also helped Malaysian team to win gold at the 2022 Badminton Asia Team Championships and 2022 Commonwealth Games.

== Early life and background ==
Ng was born in Johor Bahru to Angela Tan and badminton coach, Wilson Ng Soon Tuan. He is the eldest of three siblings. He started to take interest in badminton at the age of four after watching a local badminton match.

== Career ==
=== 2017 ===
In July, Ng competed at the 2017 Asian Junior Championships where he was part of Malaysia's mixed team that won bronze. He then went on to win another bronze medal in the boys' doubles event with Chia Wei Jie.

He was also one of the players that won a silver at the 2017 World Junior Championships mixed team event in October.

=== 2018 ===
In July, Ng won a second consecutive bronze medal in the mixed team event at the 2018 Asian Junior Championships. He then played the boys' singles event and crashed out in the quarter-finals.

In November, he competed at the 2018 World Junior Championships where he defeated the 13th and 2nd seeds in the third and fourth rounds respectively. However, his run ended in the quarter-finals to the eventual finalist, Kodai Naraoka.

=== 2019–2020 ===
In September, Ng won his first international title at the South Australia International after defeating top seed Lee Hyun-il in the final. In October, he reached the semi-finals of Indonesia International but lost out to home player Sony Dwi Kuncoro.

Ng was part of Malaysia's men's team that won silver at the 2020 Asia Team Championships in February 2020.

=== 2021 ===
After more than a year not competing due to pandemic, Ng made a return to international badminton at the Polish Open in March. He won the men's singles title after defeating Pablo Abián in the final.

He was then selected to represent Malaysia at the 2021 Sudirman Cup and 2020 Thomas Cup.

In October, he competed at the Czech Open and finished as runner-up. In the following week, he entered the final of Belgian International and emerged as the champion.

In November, he won his third title of the year at the Scottish Open, beating compatriot Soong Joo Ven in the final.

=== 2022: Commonwealth Games silver ===
In January, Ng competed at the India Open but lost in the semi-finals to Lakshya Sen in three games.

He was part of Malaysia's men's team that won gold at the 2022 Asia Team Championships in February. He delivered the point that crowned the team as champions when he defeated Ikhsan Rumbay of Indonesia.

In June, Ng was chosen to represent the national team at the 2022 Commonwealth Games in Birmingham, replacing Lee Zii Jia who opted to skip the games.

In August, he made his debut at the 2022 Commonwealth Games in the mixed team event. In the final, he beat Srikanth Kidambi to score a crucial point for Malaysia which eventually lead to Malaysia winning gold. He later competed in the men's singles event as the fifth seed. In the quarter-finals, he created an upset after beating the reigning world champion and top seed Loh Kean Yew. He then defeated Srikanth Kidambi once again in the semi-finals, securing himself a spot in the final. Ng's fine run was finally stopped in the final after he fell to Lakshya Sen, ending his debut campaign with a silver medal. Later that month, he made his debut at the 2022 World Championships.

In November, he reached the semi-finals of Australian Open but lost out to Lu Guangzu of China in straight games.

In December, he ended the 2022 season with a fifth career title at the Bahrain International, defeating the reigning world junior champion Kuo Kuan-lin in the final.

=== 2023: First BWF World Tour final ===
In January, Ng made his BWF World Tour Super 1000 debut at home event Malaysia Open but lost in the second round to Kodai Naraoka in rubber game.

In February, he reached the quarter-finals of the Thailand Masters but lost out to Ng Ka Long.

In March, he competed at the All England Open. In the second round, he won against the defending champion and top seed Viktor Axelsen in three games, earning himself the biggest scalp of his career. However, he was beaten in the next round by the eventual champion, Li Shifeng. In the following week, he reached his third quarter-finals of the year at the Swiss Open but had to retire due to an injury.

Ng was part of Malaysian team that won bronze at the 2023 Sudirman Cup in May. Later that month, he competed at the Thailand Open and defeated the top seed Chou Tien-chen in the second round. He then lost in the quarter-finals once again to Lee Cheuk Yiu.

In July, he lost in the quarter-finals of the Korea Open to Singapore's Loh Kean Yew. He was also selected as one of the players to represent Malaysia at the 2022 Asian Games.

In August, he reached his sixth quarter-final of the year at the Australian Open after overcoming 7th seed Jonatan Christie in the second round. However, he bowed out of the tournament after compatriot Lee Zii Jia prevailed against him in three tight games. A few weeks later, Ng attended his second World Championships, where he was defeated in the second round by the eventual bronze medalist, Anders Antonsen.

In September, he participated in the China Open. He unexpectedly lost to Shesar Hiren Rhustavito from Indonesia in the second round. In the following week, he competed at the Hong Kong Open, where he reached his first semi-final of the year before going down to Jonatan Christie in three games.

In October, Ng concluded his debut campaign at the 2022 Asian Games with first round and quarter-final finishes in the men's team and men's singles events respectively. He then competed at the Arctic Open in the following week. He defeated Kantaphon Wangcharoen, Chou Tien-chen, Lu Guangzu and Kanta Tsuneyama en route to his first BWF World Tour final. He finally fell to fellow countryman Lee Zii Jia in the final match, finishing as the runner-up.

=== 2024 - 2025: Injury-riddled season ===
At his home event, the Malaysia Open in January, Ng retired in the first round with a score of 8–12 against Koki Watanabe of Japan after hurting his back.

In February, he won a silver medal as a part of Malaysia's men's team at the 2024 Asia Team Championships. Ng played one match against Kan Kah Kit from Brunei which he won 21–7, 21–11. He then underwent a surgery for the back injury he sustained during the tournament, forcing him to withdraw from several tournaments.

In the following months, he withdrew from the Spain Masters and the 2024 Asian Championships to focus on recovery, ending his hopes for an Olympic debut. He was also omitted from Malaysia's lineup for the 2024 Thomas Cup.

On 13 August 2024, national coaching director Rexy Mainaky confirmed the absence of Ng in the remaining tournaments of the season and would only return in January 2025.

Ng returned to competitive action in April 2025 at the Badminton Asia Championships and fell 21–9, 21–12 in the first round to Thailand's world champion Kunlavut Vitidsarn. Subsequently, he competed at the Taipei Open, Thailand Masters and Malaysia Masters. Unfortunately, he had to retired from the first round match at the Malaysia Masters due to anterior cruciate ligament (ACL) injury. Ng undergone a surgery in Doha, Qatar on 7 July and will go through about four weeks of rehabilitation there before returning to Malaysia to continue his recovery.

== Achievements ==
=== Commonwealth Games ===
Men's singles
Year	Venue	Opponent	Score	Result
2022	National Exhibition Centre; Birmingham, England	(India) Lakshya Sen	21–19, 9–21, 16–21	Silver

=== Asian Junior Championships ===
Boys' doubles
Year	Venue	Partner	Opponent	Score	Result
2017	Jaya Raya Sports Hall Training Center; Jakarta, Indonesia	(Malaysia) Chia Wei Jie	(China) Di Zijian (China) Wang Chang	21–23, 13–21	Bronze

=== BWF World Tour (1 runner-up) ===
The BWF World Tour, which was announced on 19 March 2017 and implemented in 2018, is a series of elite badminton tournaments sanctioned by the Badminton World Federation (BWF). The BWF World Tour is divided into levels of World Tour Finals, Super 1000, Super 750, Super 500, Super 300, and the BWF Tour Super 100.

Men's singles
Year	Tournament	Level	Opponent	Score	Result	Ref.
2023	Arctic Open	Super 500	(Malaysia) Lee Zii Jia	14–21, 15–21	(silver) Runner-up	

=== BWF International Challenge/Series (5 titles, 1 runner-up) ===
Men's singles
Year	Tournament	Opponent	Score	Result
2019	South Australia International	(South Korea) Lee Hyun-il	23–21, 5–1^{r}	(gold) Winner
2021	Polish Open	(Spain) Pablo Abián	21–19, 21–11	(gold) Winner
2021	Czech Open	(Czech Republic) Jan Louda	21–16, 16–21, 25–27	(silver) Runner-up
2021	Belgian International	(India) Ajay Jayaram	21–14, 21–14	(gold) Winner
2021	Scottish Open	(Malaysia) Soong Joo Ven	21–18, 21–14	(gold) Winner
2022	Bahrain International	(Chinese Taipei) Kuo Kuan-lin	21–15, 20–22, 21–12	(gold) Winner

BWF International Challenge tournament
BWF International Series tournament
BWF Future Series tournament

== Record against selected opponents ==
Record against year-end Finals finalists, World Championships semi-finalists, and Olympic quarter-finalists. Accurate as of 19 November 2023.

Player	Matches	Win	Lost	Diff.
(Singapore) Loh Kean Yew	4	3	1	+2
(South Korea) Heo Kwang-hee	2	2	0	+2
(Thailand) Kantaphon Wangcharoen	2	2	0	+2
(Chinese Taipei) Chou Tien-chen	5	3	2	+1
(India) Prannoy H. S.	1	1	0	+1
(China) Zhao Junpeng	1	1	0	+1
(India) Srikanth Kidambi	4	2	2	0
(Denmark) Viktor Axelsen	2	1	1	0
(Denmark) Anders Antonsen	1	0	1	–1
(Indonesia) Anthony Sinisuka Ginting	1	0	1	–1
(China) Shi Yuqi	1	0	1	–1
(Thailand) Kunlavut Vitidsarn	2	0	2	–2
(Japan) Kodai Naraoka	3	0	3	–3
(India) Lakshya Sen	4	0	4	–4
