= Na Sung-seung =

South Korean badminton player (born 1999)

Na Sung-seung 나성승
Personal information
- Born: 28 August 1999 (age 27)
- Height: 1.69 m (5 ft 7 in)

Sport
- Country: South Korea
- Sport: Badminton
- Handedness: Right

Men's & mixed doubles
- Highest ranking: 28 (MD with Jin Yong, 28 May 2024); 43 (MD with Wang Chan, 10 March 2020); 110 (XD with Kim Min-ji, 24 January 2023)
- Current ranking: 60 (MD with Jin Yong, 16 June 2026)
- BWF profile
Medal record
Men's badminton
Representing South Korea
Sudirman Cup
Silver medal – second place	2023 Suzhou	Mixed team
Asian Games
Bronze medal – third place	2022 Hangzhou	Men's team
Asia Mixed Team Championships
Silver medal – second place	2023 Dubai	Mixed team
Asia Team Championships
Bronze medal – third place	2022 Selangor	Men's team
World Junior Championships
Bronze medal – third place	2017 Yogyakarta	Mixed team
Asian Junior Championships
Gold medal – first place	2017 Jakarta	Mixed team
Silver medal – second place	2016 Bangkok	Mixed team
Silver medal – second place	2017 Jakarta	Boys' doubles
Silver medal – second place	2017 Jakarta	Mixed doubles

Na Sung-seung (Korean: 나성승; Hanja: 羅聖勝; born 28 August 1999) is a South Korean badminton player.

== Achievements ==
=== Asian Junior Championships ===
Boys' doubles
Year	Venue	Partner	Opponent	Score	Result
2017	Jaya Raya Sports Hall Training Center; Jakarta, Indonesia	(South Korea) Lee Sang-min	(China) Di Zijian (China) Wang Chang	19–21, 11–21	Silver

Mixed doubles
Year	Venue	Partner	Opponent	Score	Result
2017	Jaya Raya Sports Hall Training Center; Jakarta, Indonesia	(South Korea) Seong Ah-yeong	(Indonesia) Rehan Naufal Kusharjanto (Indonesia) Siti Fadia Silva Ramadhanti	19–21, 21–19, 9–21	Silver

=== BWF World Tour (2 titles, 4 runners-up) ===
The BWF World Tour, which was announced on 19 March 2017 and implemented in 2018, is a series of elite badminton tournaments sanctioned by the Badminton World Federation (BWF). The BWF World Tours are divided into levels of World Tour Finals, Super 1000, Super 750, Super 500, Super 300, and the BWF Tour Super 100.

Men's doubles
Year	Tournament	Level	Partner	Opponent	Score	Result
2019	Hyderabad Open	Super 100	(South Korea) Wang Chan	(Indonesia) Muhammad Shohibul Fikri (Indonesia) Bagas Maulana	18–21, 18–21	(silver) Runner-up
2019	Vietnam Open	Super 100	(South Korea) Wang Chan	(South Korea) Choi Sol-gyu (South Korea) Seo Seung-jae	21–18, 16–21, 14–21	(silver) Runner-up
2024	Malaysia Masters	Super 500	(South Korea) Jin Yong	(Denmark) Kim Astrup (Denmark) Anders Skaarup Rasmussen	18–21, 14–21	(silver) Runner-up
2025	Vietnam Open	Super 100	(South Korea) Jin Yong	(China) Chen Xujun (China) Guo Ruohan	21–10, 21–14	(gold) Winner
2025 (I)	Indonesia Masters	Super 100	(South Korea) Jin Yong	(Japan) Kakeru Kumagai (Japan) Hiroki Nishi	21–19, 13–21, 21–13	(gold) Winner
2026	Malaysia Super 100	Super 100	(South Korea) Wang Chan	(South Korea) Jin Yong (South Korea) Jo Song-hyun	17–21, 18–21	(silver) Runner-up

=== BWF International Challenge/Series (2 titles, 1 runner-up) ===
Men's doubles
Year	Tournament	Partner	Opponent	Score	Result
2022	Denmark Masters	(South Korea) Jin Yong	(Chinese Taipei) Chiu Hsiang-chieh (Chinese Taipei) Yang Ming-tse	21–13, 21–16	(gold) Winner
2023	Vietnam International	(South Korea) Jin Yong	(Indonesia) Alfian Eko Prasetya (Indonesia) Ade Yusuf Santoso	21–8, 21–6	(gold) Winner
2023	Northern Marianas Open	(South Korea) Jin Yong	(Chinese Taipei) Wei Chun-wei (Chinese Taipei) Wu Guan-xun	11–21, 21–15, 18–21	(silver) Runner-up

BWF International Challenge tournament
BWF Future Series tournament
