= Ye Hong-wei =

Taiwanese badminton player (born 1999)

Ye Hong-wei 葉宏蔚
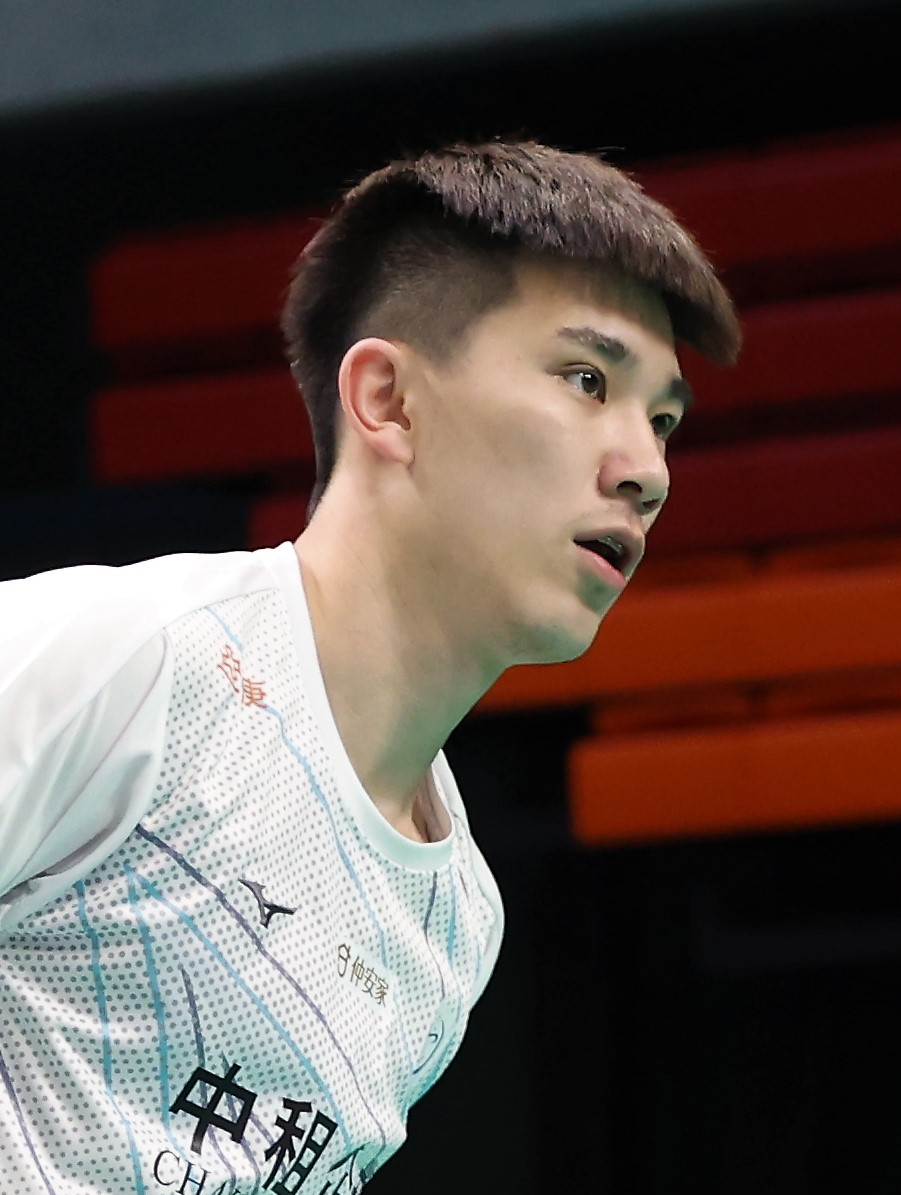
- Ye in 2025

Personal information
- Born: 1 November 1999 (age 27) Taichung, Taiwan
- Height: 1.85 m (6 ft 1 in)

Sport
- Country: Republic of China (Taiwan)
- Sport: Badminton
- Handedness: Left

Men's & mixed doubles
- Highest ranking: 27 (MD with Su Ching-heng, 30 May 2023); 10 (XD with Lee Chia-hsin, 11 June 2024); 7 (XD with Nicole Gonzales Chan, 6 October 2026)
- Current ranking: 8 (XD with Nicole Gonzales Chan, 17 November 2026)
- BWF profile
Medal record
Men's badminton
Representing Chinese Taipei
Thomas Cup
Bronze medal – third place	2024 Chengdu	Men's team
Asian Games
Bronze medal – third place	2026 Aichi–Nagoya	Mixed doubles
World University Games
Gold medal – first place	2021 Chengdu	Mixed doubles
Gold medal – first place	2021 Chengdu	Mixed team

Ye Hong-wei (Chinese: 葉宏蔚; pinyin: Yè Hóngwèi; Wade–Giles: Yeh Hung-wei; born 1 November 1999) is a Taiwanese badminton player. He was the mixed doubles gold medalist in the 2021 World University Games partnered with Lee Chia-hsin.

== Achievements ==
=== Asian Games ===
Mixed doubles
Year	Venue	Partner	Opponent	Score	Result	Ref.
2026	Ichinomiya City Municipal Gymnasium, Ichinomiya, Japan	(Chinese Taipei) Nicole Gonzales Chan	(China) Jiang Zhenbang (China) Wei Yaxin	13–21, 9–21	Bronze	

=== World University Games ===
Mixed doubles
Year	Venue	Partner	Opponent	Score	Result
2021	Shuangliu Sports Centre Gymnasium; Chengdu, China	(Chinese Taipei) Lee Chia-hsin	(Chinese Taipei) Lee Fang-chih (Chinese Taipei) Teng Chun-hsun	21–15, 21–17	Gold

=== BWF World Tour (4 titles, 2 runners-up) ===
The BWF World Tour, which was announced on 19 March 2017 and implemented in 2018, is a series of elite badminton tournaments sanctioned by the Badminton World Federation (BWF). The BWF World Tour is divided into levels of World Tour Finals, Super 1000, Super 750, Super 500, Super 300 (part of the HSBC World Tour), and the BWF Tour Super 100.

Men's doubles
Year	Tournament	Level	Partner	Opponent	Score	Result
2023	Thailand Masters	Super 300	(Chinese Taipei) Su Ching-heng	(Indonesia) Leo Rolly Carnando (Indonesia) Daniel Marthin	16–21, 17–21	(silver) Runner-up

Mixed doubles
Year	Tournament	Level	Partner	Opponent	Score	Result
2022	Canada Open	Super 100	(Chinese Taipei) Lee Chia-hsin	(Japan) Hiroki Midorikawa (Japan) Natsu Saito	12–21, 21–12, 21–15	(gold) Winner
2023	Orléans Masters	Super 300	(Chinese Taipei) Lee Chia-hsin	(Malaysia) Chen Tang Jie (Malaysia) Toh Ee Wei	19–21, 17–21	(silver) Runner-up
2023	U.S. Open	Super 300	(Chinese Taipei) Lee Chia-hsin	(Denmark) Mathias Thyrri (Denmark) Amalie Magelund	13–21, 21–6, 21–18	(gold) Winner
2024	Malaysia Super 100	Super 100	(Chinese Taipei) Nicole Gonzales Chan	(Japan) Yuichi Shimogami (Japan) Sayaka Hobara	21–19, 12–21, 22–20	(gold) Winner
2026	All England Open	Super 1000	(Chinese Taipei) Nicole Gonzales Chan	(France) Thom Gicquel (France) Delphine Delrue	21–19, 21–18	(gold) Winner

=== BWF International Challenge/Series (14 titles, 3 runners-up) ===
Men's doubles
Year	Tournament	Partner	Opponent	Score	Result
2017	Waikato International	(Chinese Taipei) Su Li-wei	(Malaysia) Chen Tang Jie (Malaysia) Soh Wooi Yik	21–16, 17–21, 21–19	(gold) Winner
2018	Austrian Open	(Chinese Taipei) Lu Chen	(New Zealand) Oliver Leydon-Davis (Denmark) Lasse Mølhede	25–23, 21–17	(gold) Winner
2018	Slovak Open	(Chinese Taipei) Lu Chen	(Thailand) Pakin Kuna-Anuvit (Thailand) Natthapat Trinkajee	21–18, 22–20	(gold) Winner
2018	Portugal International	(Chinese Taipei) Lu Chen	(Denmark) Mathias Bay-Smidt (Denmark) Frederik Søgaard	23–21, 21–18	(gold) Winner
2019	Welsh International	(Chinese Taipei) Chiang Chien-wei	(England) Zach Russ (England) Steven Stallwood	21–14, 21–14	(gold) Winner
2020	Estonian International	(Chinese Taipei) Chiang Chien-wei	(Chinese Taipei) Wei Chun-wei (Chinese Taipei) Wu Guan-xun	21–11, 21–19	(gold) Winner
2020	Swedish Open	(Chinese Taipei) Chiang Chien-wei	(Denmark) Daniel Lundgaard (Denmark) Mathias Thyrri	Walkover	(gold) Winner
2022	Portugal International	(Chinese Taipei) Su Ching-heng	(Chinese Taipei) Wei Chun-wei (Chinese Taipei) Wu Guan-xun	21–13, 21–14	(gold) Winner
2022	Polish Open	(Chinese Taipei) Su Ching-heng	(Denmark) Rasmus Kjær (Denmark) Frederik Søgaard	16–21, 21–17, 19–21	(silver) Runner-up
2022	Italian International	(Chinese Taipei) Su Ching-heng	(South Korea) Kim Jae-hwan (South Korea) Yoon Dae-il	14–21, 19–21	(silver) Runner-up
2022	Nantes International	(Chinese Taipei) Su Ching-heng	(Thailand) Chaloempon Charoenkitamorn (Thailand) Nanthakarn Yordphaisong	19–21, 21–17, 21–16	(gold) Winner

Mixed doubles
Year	Tournament	Partner	Opponent	Score	Result
2017	Waikato International	(Chinese Taipei) Teng Chun-hsun	(Indonesia) Riky Widianto (Indonesia) Richi Puspita Dili	15–21, 26–24	(silver) Runner-up
2017	Sydney International	(Chinese Taipei) Teng Chun-hsun	(Australia) Sawan Serasinghe (Australia) Setyana Mapasa	Walkover	(gold) Winner
2018	Slovak Open	(Chinese Taipei) Teng Chun-hsun	(Thailand) Pakin Kuna-Anuvit (Thailand) Supissara Paewsampran	21–16, 21–16	(gold) Winner
2022	Portugal International	(Chinese Taipei) Lee Chia-hsin	(Germany) Jan Colin Völker (Germany) Stine Küspert	21–10, 19–21, 21–9	(gold) Winner
2022	Polish Open	(Chinese Taipei) Lee Chia-hsin	(Poland) Paweł Śmiłowski (Poland) Wiktoria Adamek	22–20, 21–17	(gold) Winner
2022	Austrian Open	(Chinese Taipei) Lee Chia-hsin	(Chinese Taipei) Su Li-wei (Chinese Taipei) Chang Ching-hui	21–16, 23–21	(gold) Winner

BWF International Challenge tournament
BWF International Series tournament
BWF Future Series tournament
