= 2024 India Open =

Badminton tournament in India

Tournament details
- Dates: 16–21 January
- Edition: 22nd
- Level: Super 750
- Total prize money: US$850,000
- Venue: K. D. Jadhav Indoor Stadium
- Location: New Delhi, India

Champions
- Men's singles: (China) Shi Yuqi
- Women's singles: (Chinese Taipei) Tai Tzu-ying
- Men's doubles: (South Korea) Kang Min-hyuk (South Korea) Seo Seung-jae
- Women's doubles: (Japan) Mayu Matsumoto (Japan) Wakana Nagahara
- Mixed doubles: (Thailand) Dechapol Puavaranukroh (Thailand) Sapsiree Taerattanachai

The 2024 India Open, officially known as the Yonex Sunrise India Open 2024 for sponsorship reasons, was a badminton tournament that took place at the K. D. Jadhav Indoor Stadium, New Delhi, India, from 16 to 21 January 2024 and had a total prize of US$850,000.

== Tournament ==
The 2024 India Open was the second tournament of the 2024 BWF World Tour and was part of the India Open championships, which had been held since 1973. This tournament was organized by the Badminton Association of India with sanction from the BWF.

=== Venue ===
This tournament was held at the K. D. Jadhav Indoor Stadium in New Delhi, India.

=== Point distribution ===
Below is the point distribution table for each phase of the tournament based on the BWF points system for the BWF World Tour Super 750 event.

Winner	Runner-up	3/4	5/8	9/16	17/32
11,000	9,350	7,700	6,050	4,320	2,660

=== Prize pool ===
The total prize money is US$850,000 with the distribution of the prize money in accordance with BWF regulations.

Event	Winner	Finalist	Semi-finals	Quarter-finals	Last 16	Last 32
Singles	$59,500	$28,900	$11,900	$4,675	$2,550	$850
Doubles	$62,900	$29,750	$11,900	$5,312.5	$2,762.5	$850

== Men's singles ==
=== Seeds ===
1. (Denmark) Viktor Axelsen (withdrew)
2. (Japan) Kodai Naraoka (semi-finals)
3. (China) Li Shifeng (second round)
4. (Indonesia) Anthony Sinisuka Ginting (quarter-finals)
5. (Indonesia) Jonatan Christie (second round)
6. (China) Shi Yuqi (champion)
7. (Thailand) Kunlavut Vitidsarn (second round)
8. (India) Prannoy H. S. (semi-finals)

=== Finals ===
Semi-finals
8	(India) Prannoy H. S.	15	5
6	(China) Shi Yuqi	21	21
(Hong Kong) Lee Cheuk Yiu	21	15	21
2	(Japan) Kodai Naraoka	13	21	19

Final
6	(China) Shi Yuqi	23	21
(Hong Kong) Lee Cheuk Yiu	21	17

=== Top half ===
==== Section 1 ====
First round
PFR	(India) K George	12	15
(Chinese Taipei) Wang T-w	21	21
PFR	(Chinese Taipei) Su L-y	23	21
(France) C Popov	21	18
8	(India) Prannoy H. S.	21	21
(Chinese Taipei) Chou T-c	6	19
(India) L Sen	21	16	13
(India) P Rajawat	16	21	21

Second round
(Chinese Taipei) Wang T-w	23	6	21
PFR	(Chinese Taipei) Su L-y	21	21	5
8	(India) Prannoy H. S.	20	21	21
(India) P Rajawat	22	14	14

Quarter-finals
(Chinese Taipei) Wang T-w	11	21	18
8	(India) Prannoy H. S.	21	17	21

==== Section 2 ====
First round
3	(China) Li SF	19	21	21
PFR	(Thailand) K Wangcharoen	21	15	15
PFR	(Chinese Taipei) Lee C-h	21	19	11
(Japan) K Watanabe	13	21	21
6	(China) Shi YQ	11	21	21
(China) Weng HY	21	5	13
(Denmark) R Gemke	21	21
(Chinese Taipei) Lin C-y	19	16

Second round
3	(China) Li SF	14	21	9
(Japan) K Watanabe	21	13	21
6	(China) Shi YQ	25	21
(Denmark) R Gemke	23	6

Quarter-finals
(Japan) K Watanabe	21	13
6	(China) Shi YQ	23	21

=== Bottom half ===
==== Section 3 ====
First round
(India) S Kidambi	22	13
(Hong Kong) Lee C Y	24	21
(Denmark) M Johannesen	12	16
7	(Thailand) K Vitidsarn	21	21
(Japan) K Nishimoto	22	20	21
(China) Lu GZ	20	22	16
(Japan) K Tsuneyama	21	21	17
4	(Indonesia) A S Ginting	16	23	21

Second round
(Hong Kong) Lee C Y	16	22	23
7	(Thailand) K Vitidsarn	21	20	21
(Japan) K Nishimoto	8	17
4	(Indonesia) A S Ginting	21	21

Quarter-finals
(Hong Kong) Lee C Y	21	18	21
4	(Indonesia) A S Ginting	17	21	13

==== Section 4 ====
First round
(Canada) B Yang	17	19
(Malaysia) Lee Z J	21	21
(Hong Kong) Ng K L	13	7
5	(Indonesia) J Christie	21	21
(Japan) T Obayashi	22	21
PFR	(India) S K Karunakaran	20	16
(France) T J Popov	21	14	16
2	(Japan) K Naraoka	10	21	21

Second round
(Malaysia) Lee Z J	21	21
5	(Indonesia) J Christie	15	13
(Japan) T Obayashi	19	17
2	(Japan) K Naraoka	21	21

Quarter-finals
(Malaysia) Lee Z J	21	9	16
2	(Japan) K Naraoka	13	21	21

== Women's singles ==
=== Seeds ===
1. (South Korea) An Se-young (quarter-finals)
2. (China) Chen Yufei (final)
3. (Japan) Akane Yamaguchi (second round)
4. (Chinese Taipei) Tai Tzu-ying (champion)
5. (Spain) Carolina Marín (withdrew)
6. (China) He Bingjiao (quarter-finals)
7. (Indonesia) Gregoria Mariska Tunjung (second round)
8. (China) Han Yue (second round)

=== Finals ===
Semi-finals
(Singapore) Yeo Jia Min	13	18
4	(Chinese Taipei) Tai Tzu-ying	21	21
(China) Wang Zhiyi	13	18
2	(China) Chen Yufei	21	21

Final
4	(Chinese Taipei) Tai Tzu-ying	21	21
2	(China) Chen Yufei	16	12

=== Top half ===
==== Section 1 ====
First round
1	(South Korea) An S-y	16	21	21
(Thailand) R Intanon	21	13	16
(United States) BW Zhang	21	21
(Turkey) N Arın	15	15
7	(Indonesia) G M Tunjung	21	21
(Chinese Taipei) Sung S-y	10	15
(Chinese Taipei) Hsu W-c	18	21	13
(Singapore) Yeo J M	21	12	21

Second round
1	(South Korea) An S-y	21	14	21
(United States) BW Zhang	19	21	14
7	(Indonesia) G M Tunjung	23	14
(Singapore) Yeo J M	25	21

Quarter-finals
1	(South Korea) An S-y	19	0^{r}
(Singapore) Yeo J M	21	3

==== Section 2 ====
First round
4	(Chinese Taipei) Tai T-y	21	21
(China) Gao FJ	14	18
(Thailand) S Katethong	21	21
(Malaysia) Goh J W	10	14
6	(China) He BJ	21	21
(Canada) M Li	17	15
(Vietnam) Nguyễn T L	19	12
(Thailand) P Chochuwong	21	21

Second round
4	(Chinese Taipei) Tai T-y	21	21
(Thailand) S Katethong	12	11
6	(China) He BJ	21	21
(Thailand) P Chochuwong	6	11

Quarter-finals
4	(Chinese Taipei) Tai T-y	21	21
6	(China) He BJ	12	12

=== Bottom half ===
==== Section 3 ====
First round
(China) Zhang YM	7	14
(China) Wang ZY	21	21
(Scotland) K Gilmour	9	16
8	(China) Han Y	21	21
(Germany) Y Li	10	13
(Thailand) B Ongbamrungphan	21	21
(Denmark) M Blichfeldt	24	13
3	(Japan) A Yamaguchi	26	21

Second round
(China) Wang ZY	21	21
8	(China) Han Y	10	18
(Thailand) B Ongbamrungphan	21	21
3	(Japan) A Yamaguchi	11	19

Quarter-finals
(China) Wang ZY	22	21
(Thailand) B Ongbamrungphan	20	8

==== Section 4 ====
First round
(Japan) A Ohori	21	21
(Japan) N Nidaira	14	18
(Japan) N Okuhara	21	21
PFR	(Myanmar) Thet Htar T	11	12
(Chinese Taipei) Pai Y-p	14	21	21
(Denmark) L Kjærsfeldt	21	19	14
PFR	(India) A Kashyap	10	9
2	(China) Chen YF	21	21

Second round
(Japan) A Ohori	19	20
(Japan) N Okuhara	21	22
(Chinese Taipei) Pai Y-p	3	10
2	(China) Chen YF	21	21

Quarter-finals
(Japan) N Okuhara	9	13
2	(China) Chen YF	21	21

== Men's doubles ==
=== Seeds ===
1. (China) Liang Weikeng / Wang Chang (second round)
2. (India) Satwiksairaj Rankireddy / Chirag Shetty (final)
3. (South Korea) Kang Min-hyuk / Seo Seung-jae (champions)
4. (Malaysia) Aaron Chia / Soh Wooi Yik (semi-finals)
5. (Denmark) Kim Astrup / Anders Skaarup Rasmussen (quarter-finals)
6. (Indonesia) Fajar Alfian / Muhammad Rian Ardianto (quarter-finals)
7. (Japan) Takuro Hoki / Yugo Kobayashi (semi-finals)
8. (China) Liu Yuchen / Ou Xuanyi (quarter-finals)

=== Finals ===
Semi-finals
7	(Japan) Takuro Hoki (Japan) Yugo Kobayashi	19	14
3	(South Korea) Kang Min-hyuk (South Korea) Seo Seung-jae	21	21
4	(Malaysia) Aaron Chia (Malaysia) Soh Wooi Yik	18	14
2	(India) Satwiksairaj Rankireddy (India) Chirag Shetty	21	21

Final
3	(South Korea) Kang Min-hyuk (South Korea) Seo Seung-jae	15	21	21
2	(India) Satwiksairaj Rankireddy (India) Chirag Shetty	21	11	18

=== Top half ===
==== Section 1 ====
First round
1	(China) Liang WK (China) Wang C	21	21
(Chinese Taipei) Lee J-h (Chinese Taipei) Yang P-hs	18	18
(Scotland) A Dunn (Scotland) A Hall	21	19	16
(Thailand) S Jomkoh (Thailand) K Kedren	16	21	21
7	(Japan) T Hoki (Japan) Y Kobayashi	21	21
PFR	(France) C Popov (France) T J Popov	14	15
PFR	(India) Arjun M. R. (India) D Kapila	9	13
(Chinese Taipei) Lee Y (Chinese Taipei) Wang C-l	21	21

Second round
1	(China) Liang WK (China) Wang C	10	21	17
(Thailand) S Jomkoh (Thailand) K Kedren	21	18	21
7	(Japan) T Hoki (Japan) Y Kobayashi	15	21	21
(Chinese Taipei) Lee Y (Chinese Taipei) Wang C-l	21	15	9

Quarter-finals
(Thailand) S Jomkoh (Thailand) K Kedren	8	10
7	(Japan) T Hoki (Japan) Y Kobayashi	21	21

==== Section 2 ====
First round
3	(South Korea) Kang M-h (South Korea) Seo S-j	21	21
(Germany) M Lamsfuß (Germany) M Seidel	18	14
(China) He JT (China) Ren XY	18	21	14
(South Korea) Kim W-h (South Korea) Na S-s	21	18	21
6	(Indonesia) F Alfian (Indonesia) M R Ardianto	16	21	21
(Malaysia) Man W C (Malaysia) Tee K W	21	15	13
(Denmark) R Kjær (Denmark) F Søgaard	21	21
(Indonesia) L R Carnando (Indonesia) D Marthin	18	19

Second round
3	(South Korea) Kang M-h (South Korea) Seo S-j	21	21
(South Korea) Kim W-h (South Korea) Na S-s	16	15
6	(Indonesia) F Alfian (Indonesia) M R Ardianto	21	13	21
(Denmark) R Kjær (Denmark) F Søgaard	15	21	17

Quarter-finals
3	(South Korea) Kang M-h (South Korea) Seo S-j	21	21
6	(Indonesia) F Alfian (Indonesia) M R Ardianto	14	18

=== Bottom half ===
==== Section 3 ====
First round
(Canada) A Dong (Canada) N Yakura	11	5
(Malaysia) Goh S F (Malaysia) N Izzuddin	21	21
(France) L Corvée (France) R Labar	17	9
8	(China) Liu YC (China) Ou XY	21	21
(Japan) K Mitsuhashi (Japan) H Okamura	21	21
PFR	(India) K P Garaga (India) K S Pratheek	14	11
(Japan) A Koga (Japan) T Saito	9	21	14
4	(Malaysia) A Chia (Malaysia) Soh W Y	21	19	21

Second round
(Malaysia) Goh S F (Malaysia) N Izzuddin	19	21	17
8	(China) Liu YC (China) Ou XY	21	17	21
(Japan) K Mitsuhashi (Japan) H Okamura	10	14
4	(Malaysia) A Chia (Malaysia) Soh W Y	21	21

Quarter-finals
8	(China) Liu YC (China) Ou XY	19	19
4	(Malaysia) A Chia (Malaysia) Soh W Y	21	21

==== Section 4 ====
First round
(China) Chen BY (China) Liu Yi	21	21
(Japan) K Matsui (Japan) Y Takeuchi	18	15
(Indonesia) M S Fikri (Indonesia) B Maulana	18	21	14
5	(Denmark) K Astrup (Denmark) A S Rasmussen	21	17	21
(England) B Lane (England) S Vendy	11	16
(Chinese Taipei) Lu C-y (Chinese Taipei) Yang P-ha	21	21
(Chinese Taipei) Lee F-c (Chinese Taipei) Lee F-j	15	21	16
2	(India) S Rankireddy (India) C Shetty	21	19	21

Second round
(China) Chen BY (China) Liu Yi	21	20	11
5	(Denmark) K Astrup (Denmark) A S Rasmussen	13	22	21
(Chinese Taipei) Lu C-y (Chinese Taipei) Yang P-ha	14	15
2	(India) S Rankireddy (India) C Shetty	21	21

Quarter-finals
5	(Denmark) K Astrup (Denmark) A S Rasmussen	7	10
2	(India) S Rankireddy (India) C Shetty	21	21

== Women's doubles ==
=== Seeds ===
1. (China) Chen Qingchen / Jia Yifan (withdrew)
2. (South Korea) Baek Ha-na / Lee So-hee (semi-finals)
3. (South Korea) Kim So-yeong / Kong Hee-yong (quarter-finals)
4. (Japan) Nami Matsuyama / Chiharu Shida (quarter-finals)
5. (Indonesia) Apriyani Rahayu / Siti Fadia Silva Ramadhanti (withdrew)
6. (China) Zhang Shuxian / Zheng Yu (final)
7. (China) Liu Shengshu / Tan Ning (first round)
8. (Japan) Mayu Matsumoto / Wakana Nagahara (champions)

=== Finals ===
Semi-finals
(China) Li Wenmei (China) Liu Xuanxuan	21	17	18
6	(China) Zhang Shuxian (China) Zheng Yu	19	21	21
8	(Japan) Mayu Matsumoto (Japan) Wakana Nagahara	21	21
2	(South Korea) Baek Ha-na (South Korea) Lee So-hee	13	16

Final
6	(China) Zhang Shuxian (China) Zheng Yu	12	13
8	(Japan) Mayu Matsumoto (Japan) Wakana Nagahara	21	21

=== Top half ===
==== Section 1 ====
First round
PFR	(United States) P L Cao Hok (United States) L Lam	11	8
(China) Li WM (China) Liu XX	21	21
(United States) F Corbett (United States) A Lee	15	21	16
(Chinese Taipei) Hsu Y-c (Chinese Taipei) Lin W-c	21	15	21
PFR	(India) R Panda (India) S Panda	6	7
(Hong Kong) Yeung N T (Hong Kong) Yeung P L	21	21
(Malaysia) V Hoo (Malaysia) Lim C S	11	21	21
(United States) A Xu (United States) K Xu	21	17	13

Second round
(China) Li WM (China) Liu XX	21	24
(Chinese Taipei) Hsu Y-c (Chinese Taipei) Lin W-c	19	22
(Hong Kong) Yeung N T (Hong Kong) Yeung P L	21	15	21
(Malaysia) V Hoo (Malaysia) Lim C S	11	21	10

Quarter-finals
(China) Li WM (China) Liu XX	21	21
(Hong Kong) Yeung N T (Hong Kong) Yeung P L	15	11

==== Section 2 ====
First round
4	(Japan) N Matsuyama (Japan) C Shida	18	21	21
(India) T Jolly (India) G Gopichand	21	14	13
(Chinese Taipei) Lee C-h (Chinese Taipei) Teng C-h	12	11
(Malaysia) P Tan (Malaysia) Thinaah M	21	21
6	(China) Zhang SX (China) Zheng Y	21	21
(Netherlands) D Jille (Netherlands) C Seinen	18	18
(Canada) C Choi (Canada) J Wu	15	7
(South Korea) Lee Y-l (South Korea) Shin S-c	21	21

Second round
4	(Japan) N Matsuyama (Japan) C Shida	21	21
(Malaysia) P Tan (Malaysia) Thinaah M	16	13
6	(China) Zhang SX (China) Zheng Y	21	21
(South Korea) Lee Y-l (South Korea) Shin S-c	19	15

Quarter-finals
4	(Japan) N Matsuyama (Japan) C Shida	9	21	19
6	(China) Zhang SX (China) Zheng Y	21	11	21

=== Bottom half ===
==== Section 3 ====
First round
(Thailand) J Kititharakul (Thailand) R Prajongjai	21	18	21
(India) T Crasto (India) A Ponnappa	5	21	11
(Japan) R Hirokami (Japan) Y Kato	9	18
8	(Japan) M Matsumoto (Japan) W Nagahara	21	21
(France) M Lambert (France) A Tran	21	12	17
(China) Li YJ (China) Luo XM	18	21	21
PFR	(India) A Bhat (India) S Gautam	12	3
3	(South Korea) Kim S-y (South Korea) Kong H-y	21	21

Second round
(Thailand) J Kititharakul (Thailand) R Prajongjai	14	22	14
8	(Japan) M Matsumoto (Japan) W Nagahara	21	20	21
(China) Li YJ (China) Luo XM	18	26
3	(South Korea) Kim S-y (South Korea) Kong H-y	21	28

Quarter-finals
8	(Japan) M Matsumoto (Japan) W Nagahara	21	21
3	(South Korea) Kim S-y (South Korea) Kong H-y	13	14

==== Section 4 ====
First round
(Australia) S Mapasa (Australia) A Yu	18	10
(Bulgaria) G Stoeva (Bulgaria) S Stoeva	21	21
(Japan) R Miyaura (Japan) A Sakuramoto	21	21
7	(China) Liu SS (China) Tan N	13	12
(Japan) R Iwanaga (Japan) K Nakanishi	21	21
(Germany) L Efler (Germany) I Lohau	10	11
(Denmark) M Fruergaard (Denmark) S Thygesen	17	11
2	(South Korea) Baek H-n (South Korea) Lee S-h	21	21

Second round
(Bulgaria) G Stoeva (Bulgaria) S Stoeva	16	8
(Japan) R Miyaura (Japan) A Sakuramoto	21	21
(Japan) R Iwanaga (Japan) K Nakanishi	14	10
2	(South Korea) Baek H-n (South Korea) Lee S-h	21	21

Quarter-finals
(Japan) R Miyaura (Japan) A Sakuramoto	12	16
2	(South Korea) Baek H-n (South Korea) Lee S-h	21	21

== Mixed doubles ==
=== Seeds ===
1. (China) Zheng Siwei / Huang Yaqiong (withdrew)
2. (Japan) Yuta Watanabe / Arisa Higashino (quarter-finals)
3. (South Korea) Seo Seung-jae / Chae Yoo-jung (quarter-finals)
4. (China) Feng Yanzhe / Huang Dongping (quarter-finals)
5. (China) Jiang Zhenbang / Wei Yaxin (final)
6. (Thailand) Dechapol Puavaranukroh / Sapsiree Taerattanachai (champions)
7. (South Korea) Kim Won-ho / Jeong Na-eun (semi-finals)
8. (Hong Kong) Tang Chun Man / Tse Ying Suet (withdrew)

=== Finals ===
Semi-finals
5	(China) Jiang Zhenbang (China) Wei Yaxin	21	21
7	(South Korea) Kim Won-ho (South Korea) Jeong Na-eun	19	18
(Chinese Taipei) Ye Hong-wei (Chinese Taipei) Lee Chia-hsin	21	15	19
6	(Thailand) Dechapol Puavaranukroh (Thailand) Sapsiree Taerattanachai	18	21	21

Final
5	(China) Jiang Zhenbang (China) Wei Yaxin	16	16
6	(Thailand) Dechapol Puavaranukroh (Thailand) Sapsiree Taerattanachai	21	21

=== Top half ===
==== Section 1 ====
First round
PFR	(China) Cheng X (China) Zhang C	18	21	21
(Hong Kong) Lee C H (Hong Kong) Ng T Y	21	18	12
(France) T Gicquel (France) D Delrue	12	15
(Malaysia) Goh S H (Malaysia) S J Lai	21	21
5	(China) Jiang ZB (China) Wei YX	21	21
(Chinese Taipei) Chang K-c (Chinese Taipei) Lee C-c	18	13
(Japan) Y Kaneko (Japan) M Matsutomo	21	21
(Denmark) M Vestergaard (Denmark) C Busch	18	14

Second round
PFR	(China) Cheng X (China) Zhang C	24	10
(Malaysia) Goh S H (Malaysia) S J Lai	26	21
5	(China) Jiang ZB (China) Wei YX	21	21
(Japan) Y Kaneko (Japan) M Matsutomo	14	13

Quarter-finals
(Malaysia) Goh S H (Malaysia) S J Lai	13	13
5	(China) Jiang ZB (China) Wei YX	21	21

==== Section 2 ====
First round
4	(China) Feng YZ (China) Huang DP	21	21	21
(Indonesia) D Ferdinansyah (Indonesia) G E Widjaja	15	23	12
(Thailand) R Oupthong (Thailand) J Sudjaipraparat	19	18
(England) M Ellis (England) L Smith	21	21
7	(South Korea) Kim W-h (South Korea) Jeong N-e	21	21
(Canada) T A Lindeman (Canada) J Wu	8	14
(Japan) K Yamashita (Japan) N Shinoya	18	15
(Japan) H Midorikawa (Japan) N Saito	21	21

Second round
4	(China) Feng YZ (China) Huang DP	21	21
(England) M Ellis (England) L Smith	15	3
7	(South Korea) Kim W-h (South Korea) Jeong N-e	21	12	21
(Japan) H Midorikawa (Japan) N Saito	15	21	13

Quarter-finals
4	(China) Feng YZ (China) Huang DP	21	22	19
7	(South Korea) Kim W-h (South Korea) Jeong N-e	15	24	21

=== Bottom half ===
==== Section 3 ====
First round
(Singapore) T Hee (Singapore) J Tan	20	14
(Chinese Taipei) Ye H-w (Chinese Taipei) Lee C-h	22	21
(Indonesia) R N Kusharjanto (Indonesia) L A Kusumawati	w	/	o
8	(Hong Kong) Tang C M (Hong Kong) Tse Y S
(Chinese Taipei) Yang P-hs (Chinese Taipei) Hu L-f	15	13
(Netherlands) R Tabeling (Netherlands) S Piek	21	21
(Germany) M Lamsfuß (Germany) I Lohau	18	21	19
3	(South Korea) Seo S-j (South Korea) Chae Y-j	21	16	21

Second round
(Chinese Taipei) Ye H-w (Chinese Taipei) Lee C-h	10	21	21
(Indonesia) R N Kusharjanto (Indonesia) L A Kusumawati	21	10	16
(Netherlands) R Tabeling (Netherlands) S Piek	18	9
3	(South Korea) Seo S-j (South Korea) Chae Y-j	21	21

Quarter-finals
(Chinese Taipei) Ye H-w (Chinese Taipei) Lee C-h	21	21
3	(South Korea) Seo S-j (South Korea) Chae Y-j	19	19

==== Section 4 ====
First round
(Indonesia) R Rivaldy (Indonesia) P H Mentari	21	11	11
(Malaysia) Chen T J (Malaysia) Toh E W	14	21	21
(Thailand) S Jomkoh (Thailand) S Paewsampran	9	24
6	(Thailand) D Puavaranukroh (Thailand) S Taerattanachai	21	26
(United States) V Chiu (United States) J Gai	21	12	15
(Denmark) M Thyrri (Denmark) A Magelund	13	21	21
(Malaysia) Tan K M (Malaysia) Lai P J	7	12
2	(Japan) Y Watanabe (Japan) A Higashino	21	21

Second round
(Malaysia) Chen T J (Malaysia) Toh E W	19	16
6	(Thailand) D Puavaranukroh (Thailand) S Taerattanachai	21	21
(Denmark) M Thyrri (Denmark) A Magelund	14	15
2	(Japan) Y Watanabe (Japan) A Higashino	21	21

Quarter-finals
6	(Thailand) D Puavaranukroh (Thailand) S Taerattanachai	21	15	27
2	(Japan) Y Watanabe (Japan) A Higashino	17	21	25

Preceded by 2024 Malaysia Open	BWF World Tour; 2024 BWF season	Succeeded by 2024 Indonesia Masters
