= 2022 Japan Open =

Badminton tournament

Tournament details
- Dates: 30 August – 4 September
- Edition: 41st
- Level: Super 750
- Total prize money: US$750,000
- Venue: Maruzen Intec Arena Osaka
- Location: Osaka, Japan

Champions
- Men's singles: (Japan) Kenta Nishimoto
- Women's singles: (Japan) Akane Yamaguchi
- Men's doubles: (China) Liang Weikeng (China) Wang Chang
- Women's doubles: (South Korea) Jeong Na-eun (South Korea) Kim Hye-jeong
- Mixed doubles: (Thailand) Dechapol Puavaranukroh (Thailand) Sapsiree Taerattanachai

The 2022 Japan Open (officially known as the Daihatsu Yonex Japan Open Badminton Championships 2022) was a badminton tournament which took place at Maruzen Intec Arena Osaka in Osaka, Japan, from 30 August to 4 September 2022 and had a total purse of $750,000.

== Tournament ==
The 2022 Japan Open was the sixteenth tournament of the 2022 BWF World Tour and also part of the Japan Open championships, which had been held since 1982. This tournament was organized by the Nippon Badminton Association with sanction from the BWF.

=== Venue ===
This international tournament was held at Maruzen Intec Arena Osaka in Osaka, Japan.

=== Point distribution ===
Below is the point distribution table for each phase of the tournament based on the BWF points system for the BWF World Tour Super 750 event.

Winner	Runner-up	3/4	5/8	9/16	17/32
11,000	9,350	7,700	6,050	4,320	2,660

=== Prize pool ===
The total prize money was US$750,000 with the distribution of the prize money in accordance with BWF regulations.

Event	Winner	Finalist	Semi-finals	Quarter-finals	Last 16	Last 32
Singles	$52,500	$25,500	$10,500	$4,125	$2,250	$750
Doubles	$55,500	$26,250	$10,500	$4,687.50	$2,437.50	$750

== Men's singles ==
=== Seeds ===
1. (Denmark) Viktor Axelsen (withdrew)
2. (Japan) Kento Momota (first round)
3. (Denmark) Anders Antonsen (semi-finals)
4. (Chinese Taipei) Chou Tien-chen (final)
5. (Malaysia) Lee Zii Jia (first round)
6. (Indonesia) Anthony Sinisuka Ginting (withdrew)
7. (Indonesia) Jonatan Christie (second round)
8. (Singapore) Loh Kean Yew (second round)

=== Finals ===
Semi-finals
(China) Shi Yuqi	21	19	12
4	(Chinese Taipei) Chou Tien-chen	15	21	21
3	(Denmark) Anders Antonsen	20	19
(Japan) Kenta Nishimoto	22	21

Final
4	(Chinese Taipei) Chou Tien-chen	19	23	17
(Japan) Kenta Nishimoto	21	21	21

=== Top half ===
==== Section 1 ====
First round
PFR	(France) B Leverdez	21	9	21
(South Korea) Heo K-h	17	21	16
(Denmark) H-K Vittinghus	21	21	14
(China) Shi YQ	23	18	21
6	(Indonesia) A S Ginting
(Thailand) K Vitidsarn	w	/	o
(Thailand) K Wangcharoen	21	20	21
(China) Li SF	18	22	16

Second round
PFR	(France) B Leverdez	13	15
(China) Shi YQ	21	21
(Thailand) K Vitidsarn	19	7
(Thailand) K Wangcharoen	21	21

Quarter-finals
(China) Shi YQ	21	21
(Thailand) K Wangcharoen	6	13

==== Section 2 ====
First round
4	(Chinese Taipei) Chou T-c	18	21	21
(Hong Kong) Lee C Y	21	17	15
(China) Lu GZ	21	11	21
(Thailand) S Thammasin	11	21	17
8	(Singapore) Loh K Y	21	21
(China) Zhao JP	15	9
(India) Prannoy H. S.	11
(Hong Kong) Ng K L	10^{r}

Second round
4	(Chinese Taipei) Chou T-c	21	21
(China) Lu GZ	9	11
8	(Singapore) Loh K Y	20	19
(India) Prannoy H. S.	22	21

Quarter-finals
4	(Chinese Taipei) Chou T-c	21	15	22
(India) Prannoy H. S.	17	21	20

=== Bottom half ===
==== Section 3 ====
First round
(Chinese Taipei) Wang T-w	15	15
(Japan) K Tsuneyama	21	21
(India) S Kidambi	22	23
5	(Malaysia) Lee Z J	20	21
(Japan) K Naraoka	21	18	21
(Malaysia) Liew D	17	21	6
(France) T J Popov	13	10
3	(Denmark) A Antonsen	21	21

Second round
(Japan) K Tsuneyama	21	21
(India) S Kidambi	10	16
(Japan) K Naraoka	17	21	19
3	(Denmark) A Antonsen	21	16	21

Quarter-finals
(Japan) K Tsuneyama	11	12
3	(Denmark) A Antonsen	21	21

==== Section 4 ====
First round
(Japan) K Nishimoto	18	21	21
(India) L Sen	21	14	13
(Netherlands) M Caljouw	13	24	10
7	(Indonesia) J Christie	21	22	21
(Denmark) R Gemke	21	21
(Republic of Ireland) N Nguyen	16	16
(Indonesia) C A Dwi Wardoyo	21	22
2	(Japan) K Momota	15	20

Second round
(Japan) K Nishimoto	15	21	21
7	(Indonesia) J Christie	21	13	18
(Denmark) R Gemke	13	14
(Indonesia) C A Dwi Wardoyo	21	21

Quarter-finals
(Japan) K Nishimoto	14	21	21
(Indonesia) C A Dwi Wardoyo	21	17	18

== Women's singles ==
=== Seeds ===
1. (Japan) Akane Yamaguchi (champion)
2. (Chinese Taipei) Tai Tzu-ying (semi-finals)
3. (South Korea) An Se-young (final)
4. (China) Chen Yufei (semi-finals)
5. (Spain) Carolina Marín (quarter-finals)
6. (Japan) Nozomi Okuhara (withdrew)
7. (India) P. V. Sindhu (withdrew)
8. (Thailand) Ratchanok Intanon (quarter-finals)

=== Finals ===
Semi-finals
1	(Japan) Akane Yamaguchi	15	21	24
4	(China) Chen Yufei	21	16	22
3	(South Korea) An Se-young	21	14	21
2	(Chinese Taipei) Tai Tzu-ying	12	21	13

Final
1	(Japan) Akane Yamaguchi	21	21
3	(South Korea) An Se-young	9	15

=== Top half ===
==== Section 1 ====
First round
1	(Japan) A Yamaguchi	21	21
(India) S Nehwal	9	17
(China) He BJ	21	21
(Japan) S Takahashi	11	13
PFR	(Chinese Taipei) Hsu W-c	18	21
(China) Wang ZY	21	23
(Thailand) P Chochuwong	21	21
(Hong Kong) Cheung N Y	16	5

Second round
1	(Japan) A Yamaguchi	18	21	21
(China) He BJ	21	13	12
(China) Wang ZY	16	16
(Thailand) P Chochuwong	21	21

Quarter-finals
1	(Japan) A Yamaguchi	21	21
(Thailand) P Chochuwong	18	18

==== Section 2 ====
First round
4	(China) Chen YF	21	21
(Denmark) L Kjærsfeldt	12	15
(United States) BW Zhang	13	21	21
(Japan) S Kawakami	21	15	11
PFR	(Chinese Taipei) Pai Y-p	21	21
(Belgium) L Tan	14	10
(Germany) Y Li	9	7
(Indonesia) G M Tunjung	21	21

Second round
4	(China) Chen YF	21	21
(United States) BW Zhang	15	10
PFR	(Chinese Taipei) Pai Y-p	9	21	9
(Indonesia) G M Tunjung	21	18	21

Quarter-finals
4	(China) Chen YF	21	21
(Indonesia) G M Tunjung	17	6

=== Bottom half ===
==== Section 3 ====
First round
(United States) I Wang	24	11	19
(Denmark) L Christophersen	22	21	21
(China) Zhang YM	19	11
5	(Spain) C Marín	21	21
(Thailand) S Katethong	11	21	23
(Singapore) Yeo J M	21	16	21
(Japan) A Ohori	16	15
3	(South Korea) An S-y	21	21

Second round
(Denmark) L Christophersen	10	18
5	(Spain) C Marín	21	21
(Thailand) S Katethong	15	11
3	(South Korea) An S-y	21	21

Quarter-finals
5	(Spain) C Marín	18	21	17
3	(South Korea) An S-y	21	13	21

==== Section 4 ====
First round
(Scotland) K Gilmour	17	14
(China) Han Y	21	21
(Thailand) B Ongbamrungphan	20	17
8	(Thailand) R Intanon	22	21
(South Korea) Kim G-e	21	21
(Thailand) P Chaiwan	15	11
(Denmark) M Blichfeldt	21	15	14
2	(Chinese Taipei) Tai T-y	14	21	21

Second round
(China) Han Y	16	21	19
8	(Thailand) R Intanon	21	13	21
(South Korea) Kim G-e	21	13	10
2	(Chinese Taipei) Tai T-y	19	21	21

Quarter-finals
8	(Thailand) R Intanon	19	18
2	(Chinese Taipei) Tai T-y	21	21

== Men's doubles ==
=== Seeds ===
1. (Indonesia) Marcus Fernaldi Gideon / Kevin Sanjaya Sukamuljo (second round)
2. (Japan) Takuro Hoki / Yugo Kobayashi (first round)
3. (Indonesia) Mohammad Ahsan / Hendra Setiawan (second round)
4. (Chinese Taipei) Lee Yang / Wang Chi-lin (second round)
5. (Indonesia) Fajar Alfian / Muhammad Rian Ardianto (quarter-finals)
6. (Malaysia) Aaron Chia / Soh Wooi Yik (withdrew)
7. (Denmark) Kim Astrup / Anders Skaarup Rasmussen (final)
8. (Malaysia) Ong Yew Sin / Teo Ee Yi (quarter-finals)

=== Finals ===
Semi-finals
(South Korea) Kim Gi-jung (South Korea) Kim Sa-rang	21	18	11
7	(Denmark) Kim Astrup (Denmark) Anders Skaarup Rasmussen	13	21	21
(China) Liang Weikeng (China) Wang Chang	21	21
(South Korea) Choi Sol-gyu (South Korea) Kim Won-ho	16	16

Final
7	(Denmark) Kim Astrup (Denmark) Anders Skaarup Rasmussen	18	21	17
(China) Liang Weikeng (China) Wang Chang	21	13	21

=== Top half ===
==== Section 1 ====
First round
1	(Indonesia) M F Gideon (Indonesia) K S Sukamuljo	23	21
(Malaysia) Man W C (Malaysia) Tee K W	21	19
(Scotland) A Dunn (Scotland) A Hall	15	21	14
(South Korea) Kim G-j (South Korea) Kim S-r	21	19	21
PFR	(China) Ren XY (China) Tan Q	21	18	16
(China) Liu YC (China) Ou XY	9	21	21
(Indonesia) M S Fikri (Indonesia) B Maulana	21	18	21
(Malaysia) Goh S F (Malaysia) N Izzuddin	17	21	19

Second round
1	(Indonesia) M F Gideon (Indonesia) K S Sukamuljo	21	17	24
(South Korea) Kim G-j (South Korea) Kim S-r	17	21	26
(China) Liu YC (China) Ou XY	22	21
(Indonesia) M S Fikri (Indonesia) B Maulana	20	18

Quarter-finals
(South Korea) Kim G-j (South Korea) Kim S-r	21	21
(China) Liu YC (China) Ou XY	14	19

==== Section 2 ====
First round
4	(Chinese Taipei) Lee Y (Chinese Taipei) Wang C-l	21	28
(Chinese Taipei) Lu C-y (Chinese Taipei) Yang P-ha	12	26
(Japan) K Matsui (Japan) Y Takeuchi	14	21	13
(England) B Lane (England) S Vendy	21	17	21
7	(Denmark) K Astrup (Denmark) A S Rasmussen	21	21	21
(Singapore) T Hee (Singapore) Loh K H	23	13	18
(Denmark) J Bay (Denmark) L Mølhede	18	21	19
(Germany) M Lamsfuß (Germany) M Seidel	21	19	21

Second round
4	(Chinese Taipei) Lee Y (Chinese Taipei) Wang C-l	18	18
(England) B Lane (England) S Vendy	21	21
7	(Denmark) K Astrup (Denmark) A S Rasmussen	21	21
(Germany) M Lamsfuß (Germany) M Seidel	10	17

Quarter-finals
(England) B Lane (England) S Vendy	17	16
7	(Denmark) K Astrup (Denmark) A S Rasmussen	21	21

=== Bottom half ===
==== Section 3 ====
First round
(Malaysia) Goh V S (Malaysia) Lim K W	19	15
(Thailand) S Jomkoh (Thailand) K Kedren	21	21
(Japan) A Koga (Japan) T Saito	21	18
5	(Indonesia) F Alfian (Indonesia) M R Ardianto	23	21
(Chinese Taipei) Lee J-h (Chinese Taipei) Yang P-hs	19	19
(China) Liang WK (China) Wang C	21	21
(South Korea) Kang M-h (South Korea) Seo S-j	15	20
3	(Indonesia) M Ahsan (Indonesia) H Setiawan	21	22

Second round
(Thailand) S Jomkoh (Thailand) K Kedren	9	21	12
5	(Indonesia) F Alfian (Indonesia) M R Ardianto	21	17	21
(China) Liang WK (China) Wang C	21	21
3	(Indonesia) M Ahsan (Indonesia) H Setiawan	18	16

Quarter-finals
5	(Indonesia) F Alfian (Indonesia) M R Ardianto	18	21	16
(China) Liang WK (China) Wang C	21	19	21

==== Section 4 ====
First round
(India) K P Garaga (India) V G Panjala	18	17
(France) C Popov (France) T J Popov	21	21
(Netherlands) R Jille (Netherlands) T van der Lecq	17	9
8	(Malaysia) Ong Y S (Malaysia) Teo E Y	21	21
(India) Arjun M. R. (India) D Kapila	21	21	15
(South Korea) Choi S-g (South Korea) Kim W-h	19	23	21
(Indonesia) L R Carnando (Indonesia) D Marthin	21	21
2	(Japan) T Hoki (Japan) Y Kobayashi	14	17

Second round
(France) C Popov (France) T J Popov	13	13
8	(Malaysia) Ong Y S (Malaysia) Teo E Y	21	21
(South Korea) Choi S-g (South Korea) Kim W-h	21	21
(Indonesia) L R Carnando (Indonesia) D Marthin	15	13

Quarter-finals
8	(Malaysia) Ong Y S (Malaysia) Teo E Y	21	17	13
(South Korea) Choi S-g (South Korea) Kim W-h	17	21	21

== Women's doubles ==
=== Seeds ===
1. (China) Chen Qingchen / Jia Yifan (semi-finals)
2. (Japan) Yuki Fukushima / Sayaka Hirota (withdrew)
3. (South Korea) Lee So-hee / Shin Seung-chan (first round)
4. (South Korea) Kim So-yeong / Kong Hee-yong (semi-finals)
5. (Japan) Nami Matsuyama / Chiharu Shida (first round)
6. (Japan) Mayu Matsumoto / Wakana Nagahara (quarter-finals)
7. (Thailand) Jongkolphan Kititharakul / Rawinda Prajongjai (quarter-finals)
8. (Indonesia) Apriyani Rahayu / Siti Fadia Silva Ramadhanti (quarter-finals)

=== Finals ===
Semi-finals
1	(China) Chen Qingchen (China) Jia Yifan	21	18	19
(South Korea) Baek Ha-na (South Korea) Lee Yu-lim	12	21	21
4	(South Korea) Kim So-yeong (South Korea) Kong Hee-yong	10	21
(South Korea) Jeong Na-eun (South Korea) Kim Hye-jeong	21	23

Final
(South Korea) Baek Ha-na (South Korea) Lee Yu-lim	21	26
(South Korea) Jeong Na-eun (South Korea) Kim Hye-jeong	23	28

=== Top half ===
==== Section 1 ====
First round
1	(China) Chen QC (China) Jia YF	21	21
(Hong Kong) Yeung N T (Hong Kong) Yeung P L	14	8
(Malaysia) V Hoo (Malaysia) Lim C S	21	23
(Germany) L Efler (Germany) I Lohau	17	21
8	(Indonesia) A Rahayu (Indonesia) S F S Ramadhanti	21	21
(Canada) C Choi (Canada) J Wu	15	15
(China) Liu XX (China) Xia YT	21	21
(Malaysia) A Cheong (Malaysia) Teoh M X	9	14

Second round
1	(China) Chen QC (China) Jia YF	21	21
(Malaysia) V Hoo (Malaysia) Lim C S	16	14
8	(Indonesia) A Rahayu (Indonesia) S F S Ramadhanti	22	24
(China) Liu XX (China) Xia YT	20	22

Quarter-finals
1	(China) Chen QC (China) Jia YF	24	21	21
8	(Indonesia) A Rahayu (Indonesia) S F S Ramadhanti	26	16	14

==== Section 2 ====
First round
3	(South Korea) Lee S-h (South Korea) Shin S-c	21	14	18
(Malaysia) P Tan (Malaysia) Thinaah M	16	21	21
(South Korea) Baek H-n (South Korea) Lee Y-l	21	21
(India) K. A Bhat (India) S Gautam	15	9
6	(Japan) M Matsumoto (Japan) W Nagahara	21	21
(Japan) R Iwanaga (Japan) K Nakanishi	14	11
(Sweden) J Magnusson (Sweden) C Nistad	20	21	16
(France) M Lambert (France) A Tran	22	18	21

Second round
(Malaysia) P Tan (Malaysia) Thinaah M	21	19	11^{r}
(South Korea) Baek H-n (South Korea) Lee Y-l	13	21	16
6	(Japan) M Matsumoto (Japan) W Nagahara	21	19	21
(France) M Lambert (France) A Tran	16	21	16

Quarter-finals
(South Korea) Baek H-n (South Korea) Lee Y-l	21	21
6	(Japan) M Matsumoto (Japan) W Nagahara	17	17

=== Bottom half ===
==== Section 3 ====
First round
(Bulgaria) G Stoeva (Bulgaria) S Stoeva	15	16
(China) Zhang SX (China) Zheng Y	21	21
(India) T Jolly (India) G Gopichand	17	18
7	(Thailand) J Kititharakul (Thailand) R Prajongjai	21	21
(Thailand) B Aimsaard (Thailand) N Aimsaard	21	15	16
(China) Du Y (China) Li WM	11	21	21
(Canada) R Honderich (Canada) K Tsai	11	10
4	(South Korea) Kim S-y (South Korea) Kong H-y	21	21

Second round
(China) Zhang SX (China) Zheng Y	19	14
7	(Thailand) J Kititharakul (Thailand) R Prajongjai	21	21
(China) Du Y (China) Li WM	11	19
4	(South Korea) Kim S-y (South Korea) Kong H-y	21	21

Quarter-finals
7	(Thailand) J Kititharakul (Thailand) R Prajongjai	10	11
4	(South Korea) Kim S-y (South Korea) Kong H-y	21	21

==== Section 4 ====
First round
(Scotland) J MacPherson (Scotland) C Torrance	7	13
(Thailand) S Paewsampran (Thailand) P Supajirakul	21	21
(South Korea) Jeong N-e (South Korea) Kim H-j	23	21
5	(Japan) N Matsuyama (Japan) C Shida	21	19
(Netherlands) D Jille (Netherlands) C Seinen	16	20
(Indonesia) F D Kusuma (Indonesia) A C Pratiwi	21	22
(Denmark) M Fruergaard (Denmark) S Thygesen	21	21
PFR	(Ukraine) M Stoliarenko (Ukraine) Y Zharka	14	13

Second round
(Thailand) S Paewsampran (Thailand) P Supajirakul	13	21	7
(South Korea) Jeong N-e (South Korea) Kim H-j	21	19	21
(Indonesia) F D Kusuma (Indonesia) A C Pratiwi	21	22
(Denmark) M Fruergaard (Denmark) S Thygesen	9	20

Quarter-finals
(South Korea) Jeong N-e (South Korea) Kim H-j	19	21	21
(Indonesia) F D Kusuma (Indonesia) A C Pratiwi	21	10	16

== Mixed doubles ==
=== Seeds ===
1. (China) Zheng Siwei / Huang Yaqiong (semi-finals)
2. (Thailand) Dechapol Puavaranukroh / Sapsiree Taerattanachai (champions)
3. (Japan) Yuta Watanabe / Arisa Higashino (final)
4. (China) Wang Yilyu / Huang Dongping (semi-finals)
5. (Hong Kong) Tang Chun Man / Tse Ying Suet (quarter-finals)
6. (France) Thom Gicquel / Delphine Delrue (second round)
7. (Malaysia) Tan Kian Meng / Lai Pei Jing (quarter-finals)
8. (Germany) Mark Lamsfuß / Isabel Lohau (first round)

=== Finals ===
Semi-finals
1	(China) Zheng Siwei (China) Huang Yaqiong	17	21	21
3	(Japan) Yuta Watanabe (Japan) Arisa Higashino	21	12	23
4	(China) Wang Yilyu (China) Huang Dongping	18	18
2	(Thailand) Dechapol Puavaranukroh (Thailand) Sapsiree Taerattanachai	21	21

Final
3	(Japan) Yuta Watanabe (Japan) Arisa Higashino	21	21	18
2	(Thailand) Dechapol Puavaranukroh (Thailand) Sapsiree Taerattanachai	16	23	21

=== Top half ===
==== Section 1 ====
First round
1	(China) Zheng SW (China) Huang YQ	21	21
(India) V G Prasad (India) J Dewangan	11	10
(Denmark) M Mikkelsen (Denmark) R Søby Hansen	16	24	7
(Thailand) S Jomkoh (Thailand) S Paewsampran	21	22	21
8	(Germany) M Lamsfuß (Germany) I Lohau	21	15	17
(Netherlands) R Tabeling (Netherlands) S Piek	16	21	21
(Malaysia) Chen T J (Malaysia) Peck Y W	21	24	17
(Malaysia) Hoo P R (Malaysia) Toh E W	23	22	21

Second round
1	(China) Zheng SW (China) Huang YQ	21	21
(Thailand) S Jomkoh (Thailand) S Paewsampran	7	11
(Netherlands) R Tabeling (Netherlands) S Piek	30	18	11
(Malaysia) Hoo P R (Malaysia) Toh E W	29	21	21

Quarter-finals
1	(China) Zheng SW (China) Huang YQ	21	21
(Malaysia) Hoo P R (Malaysia) Toh E W	10	13

==== Section 2 ====
First round
3	(Japan) Y Watanabe (Japan) A Higashino	21	21
(Egypt) A H Elgamal (Egypt) D Hany	5	7
(Malaysia) Goh S H (Malaysia) S J Lai	20	21	21
(Indonesia) R N Kusharjanto (Indonesia) L A Kusumawati	22	19	12
5	(Hong Kong) Tang C M (Hong Kong) Tse Y S	21	21
(Chinese Taipei) Lee J-h (Chinese Taipei) Hsu Y-c	19	16
(Japan) Y Kaneko (Japan) M Matsutomo	24	17	21
(Japan) K Yamashita (Japan) N Shinoya	22	21	19

Second round
3	(Japan) Y Watanabe (Japan) A Higashino	21	21
(Malaysia) Goh S H (Malaysia) S J Lai	13	8
5	(Hong Kong) Tang C M (Hong Kong) Tse Y S	21	21
(Japan) Y Kaneko (Japan) M Matsutomo	18	14

Quarter-finals
3	(Japan) Y Watanabe (Japan) A Higashino	21	21
5	(Hong Kong) Tang C M (Hong Kong) Tse Y S	15	14

=== Bottom half ===
==== Section 3 ====
First round
(Hong Kong) Chang T C (Hong Kong) Ng W Y	20	15
(Chinese Taipei) Yang P-hs (Chinese Taipei) Hu L-f	22	21
(Malaysia) Chan P S (Malaysia) Cheah Y S	10	14
7	(Malaysia) Tan K M (Malaysia) Lai P J	21	21
(Indonesia) R Rivaldy (Indonesia) P H Mentari	21	19	21
(Germany) J R Jansen (Germany) L Efler	9	21	17
(Scotland) A Hall (Scotland) J MacPherson	12	11
4	(China) Wang YL (China) Huang DP	21	21

Second round
(Chinese Taipei) Yang P-hs (Chinese Taipei) Hu L-f	21	11	15
7	(Malaysia) Tan K M (Malaysia) Lai P J	14	21	21
(Indonesia) R Rivaldy (Indonesia) P H Mentari	13	18
4	(China) Wang YL (China) Huang DP	21	21

Quarter-finals
7	(Malaysia) Tan K M (Malaysia) Lai P J	16	15
4	(China) Wang YL (China) Huang DP	21	21

==== Section 4 ====
First round
(South Korea) Ko S-h (South Korea) Eom H-w	21	21
PFR	(Japan) Y Nishikawa (Japan) S Ozaki	15	15
(France) W Villeger (France) A Tran	16	24
6	(France) T Gicquel (France) D Delrue	21	26
(China) Guo XW (China) Zhang SX	14	21	12
(Singapore) T Hee (Singapore) Tan W H	21	17	21
PFR	(South Korea) Kim W-h (South Korea) Jeong N-e	16	19
2	(Thailand) D Puavaranukroh (Thailand) S Taerattanachai	21	21

Second round
(South Korea) Ko S-h (South Korea) Eom H-w	21	21
6	(France) T Gicquel (France) D Delrue	14	17
(Singapore) T Hee (Singapore) Tan W H	14	13
2	(Thailand) D Puavaranukroh (Thailand) S Taerattanachai	21	21

Quarter-finals
(South Korea) Ko S-h (South Korea) Eom H-w	11	18
2	(Thailand) D Puavaranukroh (Thailand) S Taerattanachai	21	21

Preceded by 2019 Japan Open	Japan Open	Succeeded by 2023 Japan Open
Preceded by 2022 Taipei Open	BWF World Tour; 2022 BWF season	Succeeded by 2022 Vietnam Open
