= 2023 Singapore Open (badminton) =

2023 badminton tournament

Tournament details
- Dates: 6–11 June
- Edition: 72nd
- Level: Super 750
- Total prize money: US$850,000
- Venue: Singapore Indoor Stadium
- Location: Kallang, Singapore

Champions
- Men's singles: (Indonesia) Anthony Sinisuka Ginting
- Women's singles: (South Korea) An Se-young
- Men's doubles: (Japan) Takuro Hoki (Japan) Yugo Kobayashi
- Women's doubles: (China) Chen Qingchen (China) Jia Yifan
- Mixed doubles: (Denmark) Mathias Christiansen (Denmark) Alexandra Bøje

The 2023 Singapore Open (officially known as the KFF Singapore Badminton Open 2023 for sponsorship reasons) was a badminton tournament which took place at Singapore Indoor Stadium in Singapore from 6 to 11 June 2023 and had a total purse of $850,000.

== Tournament ==
The 2023 Singapore Open was the thirteenth tournament of the 2023 BWF World Tour and also part of the Singapore Open championships, which had been held since 1929. This tournament was organized by the Singapore Badminton Association with sanction from the BWF

=== Venue ===
This international tournament was held at Singapore Indoor Stadium in Singapore.

=== Point distribution ===
Below is the point distribution table for each phase of the tournament based on the BWF points system for the BWF World Tour Super 750 event.

Winner	Runner-up	3/4	5/8	9/16	17/32
11,000	9,350	7,700	6,050	4,320	2,660

=== Prize pool ===
The total prize money is US$850,000 with the distribution of the prize money in accordance with BWF regulations.

Event	Winner	Finalist	Semi-finals	Quarter-finals	Last 16	Last 32
Singles	$59,500	$28,900	$11,900	$4,675	$2,550	$850
Doubles	$62,900	$29,750	$11,900	$5,312.5	$2,762.5	$850

== Men's singles ==
=== Seeds ===
1. (Denmark) Viktor Axelsen (Withdrew)
2. (Indonesia) Anthony Sinisuka Ginting (Champion)
3. (Japan) Kodai Naraoka (Semi-finals)
4. (Singapore) Loh Kean Yew (Second round)
5. (Chinese Taipei) Chou Tien-chen (Second round)
6. (Indonesia) Jonatan Christie (First round)
7. (Thailand) Kunlavut Vitidsarn (Semi-finals)
8. (Malaysia) Lee Zii Jia (First round)

=== Finals ===
Semi-finals
(Denmark) Anders Antonsen	19	21	21
3	(Japan) Kodai Naraoka	21	16	17
7	(Thailand) Kunlavut Vitidsarn	21	11	1^{r}
2	(Indonesia) Anthony Sinisuka Ginting	19	21	6

Final
(Denmark) Anders Antonsen	16	13
2	(Indonesia) Anthony Sinisuka Ginting	21	21

=== Top half ===
==== Section 1 ====
First round
PFR	(Chinese Taipei) Lee C-h	21	21
(Japan) K Nishimoto	18	18
(India) S Kidambi	21	21
(Thailand) K Wangcharoen	15	19
5	(Chinese Taipei) Chou T-c	18	21	21
(India) L Sen	21	17	13
(Denmark) A Antonsen	21	20	21
(France) T J Popov	16	22	19

Second round
PFR	(Chinese Taipei) Lee C-h	21	21
(India) S Kidambi	15	19
5	(Chinese Taipei) Chou T-c	12	15
(Denmark) A Antonsen	21	21

Quarter-finals
PFR	(Chinese Taipei) Lee C-h	21	13	11
(Denmark) A Antonsen	12	21	21

==== Section 2 ====
First round
3	(Japan) K Naraoka	21	21
(India) Prannoy H. S.	15	19
(Japan) K Tsuneyama	12	15
(India) P Rajawat	21	21
6	(Indonesia) J Christie	19	12
(China) Shi YQ	21	21
(Chinese Taipei) Lin C-y	18	18
(China) Lu GZ	21	21

Second round
3	(Japan) K Naraoka	21	21
(India) P Rajawat	17	16
(China) Shi YQ	18	25	21
(China) Lu GZ	21	23	19

Quarter-finals
3	(Japan) K Naraoka	21	21
(China) Shi YQ	14	16

=== Bottom half ===
==== Section 3 ====
First round
(Republic of Ireland) N Nguyen	17	21	15
(Malaysia) Ng T Y	21	18	21
(Chinese Taipei) Wang T-w	15	21	26
7	(Thailand) K Vitidsarn	21	14	28
(France) C Popov	21	21
(Israel) M Zilberman	10	18
(Hong Kong) Lee C Y	19	19
4	(Singapore) Loh K Y	21	21

Second round
(Malaysia) Ng T Y	18	24	13
7	(Thailand) K Vitidsarn	21	22	21
(France) C Popov	21	23
4	(Singapore) Loh K Y	10	21

Quarter-finals
7	(Thailand) K Vitidsarn	21	21
(France) C Popov	13	17

==== Section 4 ====
First round
(China) Li SF	21	19	21
PFR	(Malaysia) Cheam J W	16	21	14
(China) Weng HY	22	16	21
8	(Malaysia) Lee Z J	20	21	19
(Canada) B Yang	21	21
(Denmark) R Gemke	18	14
(Hong Kong) Ng K L	15	22
2	(Indonesia) A S Ginting	21	24

Second round
(China) Li SF	21	9	21
(China) Weng HY	9	21	19
(Canada) B Yang	19	11
2	(Indonesia) A S Ginting	21	21

Quarter-finals
(China) Li SF	13	21	12
2	(Indonesia) A S Ginting	21	16	21

== Women's singles ==
=== Seeds ===
1. (Japan) Akane Yamaguchi (Final)
2. (South Korea) An Se-young (Champion)
3. (Chinese Taipei) Tai Tzu-ying (Semi-finals)
4. (China) Chen Yufei (Semi-finals)
5. (China) He Bingjiao (Quarter-finals)
6. (Spain) Carolina Marín (Second round)
7. (Thailand) Ratchanok Intanon (Second round)
8. (China) Wang Zhiyi (Quarter-finals)

=== Finals ===
Semi-finals
1	(Japan) Akane Yamaguchi	21	18	21
4	(China) Chen Yufei	10	21	16
3	(Chinese Taipei) Tai Tzu-ying	16	14
2	(South Korea) An Se-young	21	21

Final
1	(Japan) Akane Yamaguchi	16	14
2	(South Korea) An Se-young	21	21

=== Top half ===
==== Section 1 ====
First round
1	(Japan) A Yamaguchi	18	21	21
(India) P. V. Sindhu	21	19	17
(Scotland) K Gilmour	11	15
(Canada) M Li	21	21
7	(Thailand) R Intanon	21	21
(India) S Nehwal	13	15
(Japan) A Ohori	19	21	21
(Chinese Taipei) Hsu W-c	21	19	19

Second round
1	(Japan) A Yamaguchi	21	21
(Canada) M Li	12	19
7	(Thailand) R Intanon	16	10
(Japan) A Ohori	21	21

Quarter-finals
1	(Japan) A Yamaguchi	21	19	21
(Japan) A Ohori	18	21	16

==== Section 2 ====
First round
4	(China) Chen YF	21	21
(Chinese Taipei) Pai Y-p	6	8
(Japan) S Kawakami	21	21
PFR	(United States) I Jaiswal	5	5
6	(Spain) C Marín	16	21	21
(Denmark) L Kjærsfeldt	21	17	12
(Thailand) S Katethong	21	21
PFR	(India) A Kashyap	17	9

Second round
4	(China) Chen YF	12	21	21
(Japan) S Kawakami	21	17	10
6	(Spain) C Marín	21	19	17
(Thailand) S Katethong	17	21	21

Quarter-finals
4	(China) Chen YF	21	21
(Thailand) S Katethong	18	15

=== Bottom half ===
==== Section 3 ====
First round
(China) Han Y	21	21
(Thailand) P Chochuwong	18	9
(United States) I Wang	15	13
5	(China) He BJ	21	21
(Indonesia) G M Tunjung	21	17	21
(United States) B Zhang	11	21	16
(Denmark) L Christophersen	15	12
3	(Chinese Taipei) Tai T-y	21	21

Second round
(China) Han Y	21	10	12
5	(China) He BJ	8	21	21
(Indonesia) G M Tunjung	10	19
3	(Chinese Taipei) Tai T-y	21	21

Quarter-finals
5	(China) He BJ	16	11
3	(Chinese Taipei) Tai T-y	21	21

==== Section 4 ====
First round
(Germany) Y Li	8	20
(Japan) N Nidaira	21	22
(Malaysia) Goh J W	11	11
8	(China) Wang ZY	21	21
(Singapore) Yeo J M	21	21
(China) Zhang YM	18	14
(South Korea) Kim G-e	16	16
2	(South Korea) An S-y	21	21

Second round
(Japan) N Nidaira	13	8
8	(China) Wang ZY	21	21
(Singapore) Yeo J M	12	11
2	(South Korea) An S-y	21	21

Quarter-finals
8	(China) Wang ZY	18	18
2	(South Korea) An S-y	21	21

== Men's doubles ==
=== Seeds ===
1. (Indonesia) Fajar Alfian / Muhammad Rian Ardianto (First round)
2. (Indonesia) Mohammad Ahsan / Hendra Setiawan (Second round)
3. (Malaysia) Aaron Chia / Soh Wooi Yik (Semi-finals)
4. (Japan) Takuro Hoki / Yugo Kobayashi (Champions)
5. (India) Satwiksairaj Rankireddy / Chirag Shetty (First round)
6. (China) Liu Yuchen / Ou Xuanyi (First round)
7. (China) Liang Weikeng / Wang Chang (Final)
8. (Malaysia) Ong Yew Sin / Teo Ee Yi (Quarter-finals)

=== Finals ===
Semi-finals
7	(China) Liang Weikeng (China) Wang Chang	16	21	21
3	(Malaysia) Aaron Chia (Malaysia) Soh Wooi Yik	21	15	17
4	(Japan) Takuro Hoki (Japan) Yugo Kobayashi	23	21
(South Korea) Choi Sol-gyu (South Korea) Kim Won-ho	21	14

Final
7	(China) Liang Weikeng (China) Wang Chang	13	18
4	(Japan) Takuro Hoki (Japan) Yugo Kobayashi	21	21

=== Top half ===
==== Section 1 ====
First round
1	(Indonesia) F Alfian (Indonesia) M R Ardianto	15	18
(England) B Lane (England) S Vendy	21	21
(France) L Corvée (France) R Labar	16	15
(India) Arjun M. R. (India) D Kapila	21	21
7	(China) Liang WK (China) Wang C	21	21
(Denmark) J Bay (Denmark) L Mølhede	16	16
(Germany) M Lamsfuß (Germany) M Seidel
(Malaysia) Man W C (Malaysia) Tee K W	w	/	o

Second round
(England) B Lane (England) S Vendy	21	21
(India) Arjun M. R. (India) D Kapila	15	19
7	(China) Liang WK (China) Wang C	21	18	21
(Malaysia) Man W C (Malaysia) Tee K W	18	21	13

Quarter-finals
(England) B Lane (England) S Vendy	11	11
7	(China) Liang WK (China) Wang C	21	21

==== Section 2 ====
First round
3	(Malaysia) A Chia (Malaysia) Soh W Y	21	21
(China) He JT (China) Zhou HD	16	17
(Indonesia) M S Fikri (Indonesia) B Maulana	21	21
(Chinese Taipei) Lee Y (Chinese Taipei) Wang C-l	18	19
6	(China) Liu YC (China) Ou XY	23	28	18
(South Korea) Kim G-j (South Korea) Kim S-r	25	26	21
(Thailand) S Jomkoh (Thailand) K Kedren	21	16	16
(Indonesia) L R Carnando (Indonesia) D Marthin	16	21	21

Second round
3	(Malaysia) A Chia (Malaysia) Soh W Y	21	21
(Indonesia) M S Fikri (Indonesia) B Maulana	18	17
(South Korea) Kim G-j (South Korea) Kim S-r	14	17
(Indonesia) L R Carnando (Indonesia) D Marthin	21	21

Quarter-finals
3	(Malaysia) A Chia (Malaysia) Soh W Y	18	21	22
(Indonesia) L R Carnando (Indonesia) D Marthin	21	16	20

=== Bottom half ===
==== Section 3 ====
First round
(Chinese Taipei) Lu C-y (Chinese Taipei) Yang P-h	12	11
(China) Ren XY (China) Tan Q	21	21
(Japan) A Koga (Japan) T Saito	21	14	21
5	(India) S Rankireddy (India) C Shetty	18	21	18
(Indonesia) M F Gideon (Indonesia) K S Sukamuljo	21	21
(Chinese Taipei) Su C-h (Chinese Taipei) Ye H-w	5	15
(South Korea) Kang M-h (South Korea) Seo S-j	20	16
4	(Japan) T Hoki (Japan) Y Kobayashi	22	21

Second round
(China) Ren XY (China) Tan Q	19	14
(Japan) A Koga (Japan) T Saito	21	21
(Indonesia) M F Gideon (Indonesia) K S Sukamuljo	18	9
4	(Japan) T Hoki (Japan) Y Kobayashi	21	21

Quarter-finals
(Japan) A Koga (Japan) T Saito	21	15	20
4	(Japan) T Hoki (Japan) Y Kobayashi	12	21	22

==== Section 4 ====
First round
(Denmark) K Astrup (Denmark) A S Rasmussen	21	18	19
(Indonesia) P Kusumawardana (Indonesia) Y Rambitan	12	21	21
(France) C Popov (France) T J Popov	18	13
8	(Malaysia) Ong Y S (Malaysia) Teo E Y	21	21
(South Korea) Choi S-g (South Korea) Kim W-h	21	21
(Scotland) A Dunn (Scotland) A Hall	12	18
(Chinese Taipei) Lee J-h (Chinese Taipei) Yang P-h	21	17	17
2	(Indonesia) M Ahsan (Indonesia) H Setiawan	19	21	21

Second round
(Indonesia) P Kusumawardana (Indonesia) Y Rambitan	17	18
8	(Malaysia) Ong Y S (Malaysia) Teo E Y	21	21
(South Korea) Choi S-g (South Korea) Kim W-h	23	21
2	(Indonesia) M Ahsan (Indonesia) H Setiawan	21	17

Quarter-finals
8	(Malaysia) Ong Y S (Malaysia) Teo E Y	22	24	22
(South Korea) Choi S-g (South Korea) Kim W-h	20	26	24

== Women's doubles ==
=== Seeds ===
1. (China) Chen Qingchen / Jia Yifan (Champions)
2. (Japan) Nami Matsuyama / Chiharu Shida (Quarter-finals)
3. (China) Zhang Shuxian / Zheng Yu (Semi-finals)
4. (Japan) Yuki Fukushima / Sayaka Hirota (Second round)
5. (South Korea) Kim So-yeong / Kong Hee-yong (Quarter-finals)
6. (Indonesia) Apriyani Rahayu / Siti Fadia Silva Ramadhanti (Second round)
7. (Japan) Mayu Matsumoto / Wakana Nagahara (Quarter-finals)
8. (South Korea) Baek Ha-na / Lee So-hee (Final)

=== Finals ===
Semi-finals
1	(China) Chen Qingchen (China) Jia Yifan	21	21
(China) Li Wenmei (China) Liu Xuanxuan	18	12
3	(China) Zhang Shuxian (China) Zheng Yu	21	18	10
8	(South Korea) Baek Ha-na (South Korea) Lee So-hee	16	21	21

Final
1	(China) Chen Qingchen (China) Jia Yifan	21	21
8	(South Korea) Baek Ha-na (South Korea) Lee So-hee	16	12

=== Top half ===
==== Section 1 ====
First round
1	(China) Chen QC (China) Jia YF	21	21
(Canada) C Choi (Canada) J Wu	12	13
(Japan) R Miyaura (Japan) A Sakuramoto	13	17
(Thailand) B Aimsaard (Thailand) N Aimsaard	21	21
5	(South Korea) Kim S-y (South Korea) Kong H-y	21	21
(United States) S Gurazada (United States) I Jaiswal	10	14
(Germany) L Efler (Germany) I Lohau	21	16	18
(South Korea) Jeong N-e (South Korea) Kim H-j	15	21	21

Second round
1	(China) Chen QC (China) Jia YF	21	21
(Thailand) B Aimsaard (Thailand) N Aimsaard	7	13
5	(South Korea) Kim S-y (South Korea) Kong H-y	21	21
(South Korea) Jeong N-e (South Korea) Kim H-j	10	10

Quarter-finals
1	(China) Chen QC (China) Jia YF	21	21
5	(South Korea) Kim S-y (South Korea) Kong H-y	12	14

==== Section 2 ====
First round
4	(Japan) Y Fukushima (Japan) S Hirota	21	21
(Malaysia) V Hoo (Malaysia) Lim C S	12	14
(Bulgaria) G Stoeva (Bulgaria) S Stoeva
(China) Li WM (China) Liu XX	w	/	o
7	(Japan) M Matsumoto (Japan) W Nagahara	19	22	21
(France) M Lambert (France) A Tran	21	20	17
(Indonesia) L T Mayasari (Indonesia) R Sugiarto	17	10
(Indonesia) F D Kusuma (Indonesia) A C Pratiwi	21	21

Second round
4	(Japan) Y Fukushima (Japan) S Hirota	15	19
(China) Li WM (China) Liu XX	21	21
7	(Japan) M Matsumoto (Japan) W Nagahara	21	14	21
(Indonesia) F D Kusuma (Indonesia) A C Pratiwi	16	21	14

Quarter-finals
(China) Li WM (China) Liu XX	22	21
7	(Japan) M Matsumoto (Japan) W Nagahara	20	19

=== Bottom half ===
==== Section 3 ====
First round
(Malaysia) P Tan (Malaysia) Thinaah M	13	21	9^{r}
(Japan) R Iwanaga (Japan) K Nakanishi	21	17	16
(Singapore) Jin YJ (Singapore) C Wong	21	19	15
6	(Indonesia) A Rahayu (Indonesia) S F S Ramadhanti	15	21	21
(Japan) R Hirokami (Japan) Y Kato	23	21
(Scotland) J MacPherson (Scotland) C Torrance	21	10
PFR	(Indonesia) M T Puspita Sari (Indonesia) R A Rose	14	13
3	(China) Zhang SX (China) Zheng Y	21	21

Second round
(Japan) R Iwanaga (Japan) K Nakanishi	21	19	21
6	(Indonesia) A Rahayu (Indonesia) S F S Ramadhanti	19	21	15
(Japan) R Hirokami (Japan) Y Kato	16	16
3	(China) Zhang SX (China) Zheng Y	21	21

Quarter-finals
(Japan) R Iwanaga (Japan) K Nakanishi	19	21	16
3	(China) Zhang SX (China) Zheng Y	21	19	21

==== Section 4 ====
First round
(India) T Jolly (India) G Gopichand	14	21	19
(Hong Kong) Yeung N T (Hong Kong) Yeung P L	21	18	21
(Chinese Taipei) Lee C-h (Chinese Taipei) Teng C-h	10	17
8	(South Korea) Baek H-n (South Korea) Lee S-h	21	21
(Thailand) J Kititharakul (Thailand) R Prajongjai	14	22	22
(England) C Birch (England) L Smith	21	20	20
(Netherlands) D Jille (Netherlands) C Seinen	22	20	14
2	(Japan) N Matsuyama (Japan) C Shida	20	22	21

Second round
(Hong Kong) Yeung N T (Hong Kong) Yeung P L	21	11
8	(South Korea) Baek H-n (South Korea) Lee S-h	23	21
(Thailand) J Kititharakul (Thailand) R Prajongjai	21	14	16
2	(Japan) N Matsuyama (Japan) C Shida	17	21	21

Quarter-finals
8	(South Korea) Baek H-n (South Korea) Lee S-h	21	20	23
2	(Japan) N Matsuyama (Japan) C Shida	17	22	21

== Mixed doubles ==
=== Seeds ===
1. (China) Zheng Siwei / Huang Yaqiong (Quarter-finals)
2. (Japan) Yuta Watanabe / Arisa Higashino (Final)
3. (Thailand) Dechapol Puavaranukroh / Sapsiree Taerattanachai (Second round)
4. (South Korea) Seo Seung-jae / Chae Yu-jung (First round)
5. (France) Thom Gicquel / Delphine Delrue (Second round)
6. (China) Feng Yanzhe / Huang Dong Ping (Quarter-finals)
7. (Malaysia) Goh Soon Huat / Shevon Jemie Lai (Second round)
8. (South Korea) Kim Won-ho / Jeong Na-eun (Semi-finals)

=== Finals ===
Semi-finals
8	(South Korea) Kim Won-ho (South Korea) Jeong Na-eun	19	9
(Denmark) Mathias Christiansen (Denmark) Alexandra Bøje	21	21
(Malaysia) Chen Tang Jie (Malaysia) Toh Ee Wei	17	22
2	(Japan) Yuta Watanabe (Japan) Arisa Higashino	21	24

Final
(Denmark) Mathias Christiansen (Denmark) Alexandra Bøje	21	20	21
2	(Japan) Yuta Watanabe (Japan) Arisa Higashino	14	22	16

=== Top half ===
==== Section 1 ====
First round
1	(China) Zheng SW (China) Huang YQ	21	21
(Chinese Taipei) Yang P-h (Chinese Taipei) Hu L-f	18	9
(Denmark) M Thyrri (Denmark) A Magelund	21	21
(Indonesia) D Ferdinansyah (Indonesia) G E Widjaja	17	19
8	(South Korea) Kim W-h (South Korea) Jeong N-e	21	14	21
(Malaysia) Tan K M (Malaysia) Lai P J	12	21	10
(England) M Ellis (England) L Smith	21	22
(Japan) H Midorikawa (Japan) N Saito	17	20

Second round
1	(China) Zheng SW (China) Huang YQ	21	21
(Denmark) M Thyrri (Denmark) A Magelund	13	12
8	(South Korea) Kim W-h (South Korea) Jeong N-e	21	21
(England) M Ellis (England) L Smith	8	10

Quarter-finals
1	(China) Zheng SW (China) Huang YQ	19	19
8	(South Korea) Kim W-h (South Korea) Jeong N-e	21	21

==== Section 2 ====
First round
3	(Thailand) D Puavaranukroh (Thailand) S Taerattanachai	14	21	21
(Japan) Y Kaneko (Japan) M Matsutomo	21	13	10
(Denmark) M Christiansen (Denmark) A Bøje	20	21	21
(Singapore) T Hee (Singapore) J Tan	22	13	13
5	(France) T Gicquel (France) D Delrue	18	21	21
(Hong Kong) Tang C M (Hong Kong) Tse Y S	21	18	14
(Thailand) S Jomkoh (Thailand) S Paewsampran	18	21	21
(England) G Mairs (England) J Moore	21	14	12

Second round
3	(Thailand) D Puavaranukroh (Thailand) S Taerattanachai	24	20
(Denmark) M Christiansen (Denmark) A Bøje	26	22
5	(France) T Gicquel (France) D Delrue	11	21
(Thailand) S Jomkoh (Thailand) S Paewsampran	21	23

Quarter-finals
(Denmark) M Christiansen (Denmark) A Bøje	21	19	21
(Thailand) S Jomkoh (Thailand) S Paewsampran	13	21	19

=== Bottom half ===
==== Section 3 ====
First round
(Hong Kong) Lee C H (Hong Kong) Ng T Y	21	17	21
(Scotland) A Hall (Scotland) J MacPherson	14	21	11
(Indonesia) R N Kusharjanto (Indonesia) L A Kusumawati	21	18	14
7	(Malaysia) Goh S H (Malaysia) S J Lai	15	21	21
(Japan) K Yamashita (Japan) N Shinoya	19	11
(Malaysia) Chen T J (Malaysia) Toh E W	21	21
(Netherlands) R Tabeling (Netherlands) S Piek	5
4	(South Korea) Seo S-j (South Korea) Chae Y-j	1^{r}

Second round
(Hong Kong) Lee C H (Hong Kong) Ng T Y	14	21	21
7	(Malaysia) Goh S H (Malaysia) S J Lai	21	16	9
(Malaysia) Chen T J (Malaysia) Toh E W	21	21
(Netherlands) R Tabeling (Netherlands) S Piek	17	17

Quarter-finals
(Hong Kong) Lee C H (Hong Kong) Ng T Y	14	21	18
(Malaysia) Chen T J (Malaysia) Toh E W	21	16	21

==== Section 4 ====
First round
(Chinese Taipei) Ye H-w (Chinese Taipei) Lee C-h	w	/	o
(Germany) M Lamsfuß (Germany) I Lohau
(China) Jiang ZB (China) Wei YX	14	9
6	(China) Feng YZ (China) Huang DP	21	21
(Indonesia) R Rivaldy (Indonesia) P H Mentari	21	19	21
(Indonesia) P Jordan (Indonesia) M D Oktavianti	17	21	16
(South Korea) Ko S-h (South Korea) Eom H-w	15	12
2	(Japan) Y Watanabe (Japan) A Higashino	21	21

Second round
(Chinese Taipei) Ye H-w (Chinese Taipei) Lee C-h	15	16
6	(China) Feng YZ (China) Huang DP	21	21
(Indonesia) R Rivaldy (Indonesia) P H Mentari	16	21	12
2	(Japan) Y Watanabe (Japan) A Higashino	21	17	21

Quarter-finals
6	(China) Feng YZ (China) Huang DP	21	21	17
2	(Japan) Y Watanabe (Japan) A Higashino	23	12	21

Preceded by 2023 Thailand Open	BWF World Tour; 2023 BWF season	Succeeded by 2023 Indonesia Open
