= Arisa Igarashi =

Japanese badminton player (born 1996)

Personal information
- Born: Arisa Higashino 東野 有紗; 1 August 1996 (age 30) Iwamizawa, Hokkaido, Japan
- Height: 1.60 m (5 ft 3 in)
- Weight: 54 kg (119 lb)
- Spouse: Yu Igarashi (m. 2024)

Sport
- Country: Japan
- Sport: Badminton
- Handedness: Right
- Coached by: Jeremy Gan (2018–2024)

Women's & mixed doubles
- Highest ranking: 12 (WD with Chiharu Shida, 2 June 2026); 1 (XD with Yuta Watanabe, 8 November 2022)
- BWF profile
Medal record
Women's badminton
Representing Japan
Olympic Games
| Bronze medal – third place | 2020 Tokyo | Mixed doubles |
| Bronze medal – third place | 2024 Paris | Mixed doubles |
World Championships
| Silver medal – second place | 2021 Huelva | Mixed doubles |
| Silver medal – second place | 2022 Tokyo | Mixed doubles |
| Bronze medal – third place | 2019 Basel | Mixed doubles |
| Bronze medal – third place | 2023 Copenhagen | Mixed doubles |
Sudirman Cup
| Silver medal – second place | 2019 Nanning | Mixed team |
| Silver medal – second place | 2021 Vantaa | Mixed team |
| Bronze medal – third place | 2017 Gold Coast | Mixed team |
| Bronze medal – third place | 2023 Suzhou | Mixed team |
| Bronze medal – third place | 2025 Xiamen | Mixed team |
Uber Cup
| Silver medal – second place | 2020 Aarhus | Women's team |
| Bronze medal – third place | 2026 Horsens | Women's team |
Asian Games
| Gold medal – first place | 2018 Jakarta–Palembang | Women's team |
| Silver medal – second place | 2022 Hangzhou | Mixed doubles |
| Bronze medal – third place | 2022 Hangzhou | Women's team |
Asian Championships
| Bronze medal – third place | 2022 Manila | Mixed doubles |
Asia Mixed Team Championships
| Gold medal – first place | 2017 Ho Chi Minh | Mixed team |
| Silver medal – second place | 2019 Hong Kong | Mixed team |
| Bronze medal – third place | 2025 Qingdao | Mixed team |
World Junior Championships
| Bronze medal – third place | 2014 Alor Setar | Mixed doubles |
| Bronze medal – third place | 2014 Alor Setar | Mixed team |
Asian Junior Championships
| Bronze medal – third place | 2013 Kota Kinabalu | Mixed team |
| Bronze medal – third place | 2014 Taipei | Mixed team |

Arisa Igarashi (五十嵐 有紗, Igarashi Arisa; née Higashino (東野); born 1 August 1996) is a Japanese badminton player. She won bronze in the mixed team event at the Asian Junior Championships in 2013 and 2014, and competed at the 2014 World Junior Championships, winning two bronzes in the mixed doubles and team event.

Higashino won her maiden Super 1000 tournament at the 2018 and 2021 All England Open in the mixed doubles event, partnering with Yuta Watanabe, and had also won 2 consecutive bronze medals in mixed doubles at the 2020 and 2024 Summer Olympics.

== Career ==
Higashino was born in Iwamizawa, graduated from the Tomioka Senior High School, and joined the Unisys team in 2015.

Higashino was selected to join national junior team, competed at the 2014 Asian Junior Championships, and helped the team win the bronze medal. At the World Junior Championships in Alor Setar, Malaysia, she won the bronze medals in the mixed doubles event with Yuta Watanabe and in the mixed team event. In June 2014, she made her first appearance in the senior international event at the Japan Open, competed in the mixed doubles with Watanabe, but the duo was defeated in the first round. She reached her first final in the senior international event at the 2015 Russian Open a BWF Grand Prix tournament, where she and her partner Watanabe were defeated by Chan Peng Soon and Goh Liu Ying.

In 2016, Higashino won her first senior title at Vietnam International Challenge in the mixed doubles paired-up with Watanabe. In 2017, Higashino and Watanabe have sufficient ranking points to entered the Superseries stage, and able to reached the semi-finals in the All England Open.

=== 2018: Break to top 5 BWF rankings, All England Open title ===
Significant progress occurs in 2018 season. Higashino with her partner Watanabe in the mixed doubles are able to break the international doubles stage by reaching third in the BWF rankings. Higashino and Watanabe became the first mixed doubles from Japan to win the All England Open since the tournament was first contested in 1899. En route to the finals, they beating the top three seeds, and then clinched the title after defeating the fifth seeded pair Zheng Siwei and Huang Yaqiong in the rubber game. Both also won the Hong Kong Open after beating Wang Yilyu and Huang Dongping in the finals. It was their first win over the world silver medallists in six meetings. Besides that, the duo finished in the semi-finals at the Malaysia, Japan, French, and Fuzhou China Opens; as well in the year-end tournament BWF World Tour Finals. Higashino also part of the Japanese national team that won the gold medal in the Asian Games.

=== 2019–2020: World Championships bronze ===
In the first half of the 2019 season, Higashino and Watanabe has won a title in the Malaysia Masters. She reached the finals in the All England Open, losing to Zheng Siwei and Huang Yaqiong. Together with the National team, she won the silver medal at the Asia Mixed Team Championships and at the Sudirman Cup. In the second half of 2019 season, Higashino added a cap by defending the Hong Kong Open title, and became a finalists in the Thailand Open. Their journey in the remainder of the season does look quite difficult. In four meetings against Zheng Siwei and Huang Yaqiong, they only managed to win once, in the group stage of the World Tour Finals; the rest were losses in the semi-finals of the World Championships, French Open and World Tour Finals. The head-to-head record between the pairs stood at 2–8.

Due to the COVID-19 pandemic, numerous tournaments on the 2020 BWF World Tour were either cancelled or rescheduled for later in the year. Higashino competed in the national events in December, and managed to claim his fourth mixed doubles consecutive title at the Japanese National Championships with Watanabe.

=== 2021: Second All England title, Olympic bronze, and World Championships silver ===
In March, Higashino and Watanabe won their second All England Open title, defeating teammates Yuki Kaneko and Misaki Matsutomo in the final. In July, she represented Japan at the 2020 Tokyo Olympics in mixed doubles with Watanabe. The pair won the bronze medal after defeating Hong Kong's Tang Chun Man and Tse Ying Suet in straight games.

Following the Olympics, Higashino helped Japan win silver medals at the Sudirman Cup in Vantaa and the Uber Cup in Aarhus. Higashino and Watanabe also reached five finals, winning the Denmark Open and French Open, and finishing as runners-up at the Indonesia Open and World Tour Finals. They concluded the season with a silver medal at the World Championships in Huelva, losing in the final to Thailand's Dechapol Puavaranukroh and Sapsiree Taerattanachai.

=== 2022–2023: World #1, third All England title, and first Japanese mixed doubles to win the Japan Open ===
In March 2022, Higashino and Watanabe successfully defended their title at the Super 1000 All England Open. Furthermore, she and her partner won the silver medal in the World Championships defeating by Zheng Siwei and Huang Yaqiong in the finals, and a bronze medal in the Asian Championships defeating by Wang Yilyu and Huang Dongping in the semi-finals. Another results that they achieved in 2022 were the finalists in the Indonesia and Japan Opens. Higashino and Watanabe then reached their career high as world number 1 in the BWF mixed doubles ranking on 8 November 2022.

Higashino started the 2023 season by competing in the Malaysia Open, where she and her partner, Watanabe, finished as the finalists. In the following week, they emerged as a champion in the India Open, after their opponent Wang Yilyu and Huang Dongping withdrawn from the final match. In March, they unable to defend their All England Open title, since Watanabe struggling with injury in the second round against Kim Won-ho and Jeong Na-eun. Higashino helps the national team advanced to the knocked out stage in the Sudirman Cup, where the team finished in the semi-finals. In June, Higashino and Watanabe reached the finals in the Singapore and Indonesia Opens. In the next tournaments, they stopped in the quarter-finals of the Canada Open to Taiwanese pairing Lee Jhe-huei and Hsu Ya-ching, and then in the semi-finals of the Korea Open to Chinese rising star Jiang Zhenbang and Wei Yaxin. The duo then won the Japan Open, becoming the first ever Japanaese pairing to claimed the Japan Open title since it was first contested in 1982. They clinched the bronze medal in the World Championships defeating by Seo Seung-jae and Chae Yoo-jung in the semi-finals. She competed in the 2022 Asian Games, won a silver in the mixed doubles and a gold in the women's team event. In the rest of the season, Higashino and Watanabe finished as the semi-finalists in the French Open, Japan Masters, as well in the year-end finals tournament the World Tour Finals.

=== 2024 ===
Higashino and Yuta Watanabe opened the 2024 season by winning the Super 1000 Malaysia Open. During the first half of the year, they reached the final of the All England Open, and the quarterfinals of the India Open, French Open, and Asian Championships. Prior to the Paris Olympics, the pair recorded early-round exits at the Singapore and Indonesia Opens. At the 2024 Paris Olympics, Higashino and Watanabe earned their second consecutive Olympic bronze medal in mixed doubles, defeating South Korea's Seo Seung-jae and Chae Yoo-jung in the bronze medal match. Following a quarterfinal loss at the Japan Open in August, the duo ended their 13-year partnership.

Following the Olympics, Higashino married and began competing under her married name, Arisa Igarashi. She subsequently shifted her focus to women's doubles and formed a new partnership with Ayako Sakuramoto. The pair made their World Tour debut at the Japan Masters in November, where they were eliminated in the second round by Nami Matsuyama and Chiharu Shida. In December, they finished as runners-up at the All Japan Championships after losing to Matsuyama and Shida in the final, after which they were selected to the Japanese national team for 2025.

=== 2025 ===
In January, Igarashi and Sakuramoto secured their first title as a pair at the Super 750 India Open, defeating Olympic silver medalists Liu Shengshu and Tan Ning of China in the quarterfinals, and South Korea's Kim Hye-jeong and Kong Hee-yong in the final. The following month, at the Asia Mixed Team Championships, their final tournament together as a pair, they won their women's doubles match against China's Chen Qingchen and Wang Tingge.

Their partnership officially dissolved in April following a decision reached in March after six months together, with Igarashi stating her intention to continue competing in women's doubles. On 8 July, it was announced that Igarashi would form a new partnership with Chiharu Shida, an Olympic bronze medalist. The new pair debuted at the Hong Kong Open in September, following the conclusion of Shida's partnership with Nami Matsuyama at the World Championships in August.

=== 2026 ===
In January, Igarashi briefly partnered with Miyu Takahashi, reaching the women's doubles final at the Super 500 Indonesia Masters before finishing as runners-up following a walkover. In June, Igarashi and Shida reached a peak women's doubles ranking of world No. 12.

On 31 July, Igarashi and Shida announced the dissolution of their partnership, citing differences in their future goals and approaches to the sport. Simultaneously, Igarashi announced her withdrawal from the Japanese national team. She subsequently partnered with high school student Yui Hoshino, also known as Yinfei Lu, for the Indonesia Masters Super 100 II in October.

== Personal life ==
On 28 August 2024, she announced her marriage to former badminton player, Yu Igarashi.

== Achievements ==
=== Olympic Games ===
Mixed doubles
| Year | Venue | Partner | Opponent | Score | Result | Ref. |
|---|---|---|---|---|---|---|
| 2020 | Musashino Forest Sport Plaza, Tokyo, Japan | (Japan) Yuta Watanabe | (Hong Kong) Tang Chun Man (Hong Kong) Tse Ying Suet | 21–17, 23–21 | Bronze | |
| 2024 | Porte de La Chapelle Arena, Paris, France | (Japan) Yuta Watanabe | (South Korea) Seo Seung-jae (South Korea) Chae Yoo-jung | 21–13, 22–20 | Bronze | |

=== World Championships ===
Mixed doubles
| Year | Venue | Partner | Opponent | Score | Result | Ref. |
|---|---|---|---|---|---|---|
| 2019 | St. Jakobshalle, Basel, Switzerland | (Japan) Yuta Watanabe | (China) Zheng Siwei (China) Huang Yaqiong | 11–21, 15–21 | Bronze | |
| 2021 | Palacio de los Deportes Carolina Marín, Huelva, Spain | (Japan) Yuta Watanabe | (Thailand) Dechapol Puavaranukroh (Thailand) Sapsiree Taerattanachai | 13–21, 14–21 | Silver | |
| 2022 | Tokyo Metropolitan Gymnasium, Tokyo, Japan | (Japan) Yuta Watanabe | (China) Zheng Siwei (China) Huang Yaqiong | 13–21, 16–21 | Silver | |
| 2023 | Royal Arena, Copenhagen, Denmark | (Japan) Yuta Watanabe | (South Korea) Seo Seung-jae (South Korea) Chae Yoo-jung | 15–21, 13–21 | Bronze | |

=== Asian Games ===
Mixed doubles
| Year | Venue | Partner | Opponent | Score | Result | Ref. |
|---|---|---|---|---|---|---|
| 2022 | Binjiang Gymnasium, Hangzhou, China | (Japan) Yuta Watanabe | (China) Zheng Siwei (China) Huang Yaqiong | 15–21, 14–21 | Silver | |

=== Asian Championships ===
Mixed doubles
| Year | Venue | Partner | Opponent | Score | Result | Ref. |
|---|---|---|---|---|---|---|
| 2022 | Muntinlupa Sports Complex, Metro Manila, Philippines | (Japan) Yuta Watanabe | (China) Wang Yilyu (China) Huang Dongping | 12–21, 22–24 | Bronze | |

=== World Junior Championships ===
Mixed doubles
| Year | Venue | Partner | Opponent | Score | Result | Ref. |
|---|---|---|---|---|---|---|
| 2014 | Stadium Sultan Abdul Halim, Alor Setar, Malaysia | (Japan) Yuta Watanabe | (China) Huang Kaixiang (China) Chen Qingchen | 19–21, 12–21 | Bronze | |

=== BWF World Tour (12 titles, 11 runners-up) ===
The BWF World Tour, which was announced on 19 March 2017 and implemented in 2018, is a series of elite badminton tournaments sanctioned by the Badminton World Federation (BWF). The BWF World Tour is divided into levels of World Tour Finals, Super 1000, Super 750, Super 500, Super 300, and the BWF Tour Super 100.

Women's doubles
| Year | Tournament | Level | Partner | Opponent | Score | Result | Ref. |
|---|---|---|---|---|---|---|---|
| 2025 | India Open | Super 750 | (Japan) Ayako Sakuramoto | (South Korea) Kim Hye-jeong (South Korea) Kong Hee-yong | 21–15, 21–13 | (gold) Winner | |
| 2026 | Indonesia Masters | Super 500 | (Japan) Miyu Takahashi | (Malaysia) Pearly Tan (Malaysia) Thinaah Muralitharan | Walkover | (silver) Runner-up | |

Mixed doubles
| Year | Tournament | Level | Partner | Opponent | Score | Result | Ref. |
|---|---|---|---|---|---|---|---|
| 2018 | All England Open | Super 1000 | (Japan) Yuta Watanabe | (China) Zheng Siwei (China) Huang Yaqiong | 15–21, 22–20, 21–16 | (gold) Winner | |
| 2018 | Hong Kong Open | Super 500 | (Japan) Yuta Watanabe | (China) Wang Yilyu (China) Huang Dongping | 21–18, 21–14 | (gold) Winner | |
| 2019 | Malaysia Masters | Super 500 | (Japan) Yuta Watanabe | (Thailand) Dechapol Puavaranukroh (Thailand) Sapsiree Taerattanachai | 21–18, 21–18 | (gold) Winner | |
| 2019 | All England Open | Super 1000 | (Japan) Yuta Watanabe | (China) Zheng Siwei (China) Huang Yaqiong | 17–21, 20–22 | (silver) Runner-up | |
| 2019 | Thailand Open | Super 500 | (Japan) Yuta Watanabe | (China) Wang Yilyu (China) Huang Dongping | 22–24, 21–23 | (silver) Runner-up | |
| 2019 | Hong Kong Open | Super 500 | (Japan) Yuta Watanabe | (China) He Jiting (China) Du Yue | 22–20, 21–16 | (gold) Winner | |
| 2021 | All England Open | Super 1000 | (Japan) Yuta Watanabe | (Japan) Yuki Kaneko (Japan) Misaki Matsutomo | 21–14, 21–13 | (gold) Winner | |
| 2021 | Denmark Open | Super 1000 | (Japan) Yuta Watanabe | (Thailand) Dechapol Puavaranukroh (Thailand) Sapsiree Taerattanachai | 21–18, 21–9 | (gold) Winner | |
| 2021 | French Open | Super 750 | (Japan) Yuta Watanabe | (Denmark) Mathias Christiansen (Denmark) Alexandra Bøje | 21–8, 21–17 | (gold) Winner | |
| 2021 | Indonesia Open | Super 1000 | (Japan) Yuta Watanabe | (Thailand) Dechapol Puavaranukroh (Thailand) Sapsiree Taerattanachai | 12–21, 13–21 | (silver) Runner-up | |
| 2021 | BWF World Tour Finals | World Tour Finals | (Japan) Yuta Watanabe | (Thailand) Dechapol Puavaranukroh (Thailand) Sapsiree Taerattanachai | 19–21, 11–21 | (silver) Runner-up | |
| 2022 | All England Open | Super 1000 | (Japan) Yuta Watanabe | (China) Wang Yilyu (China) Huang Dongping | 21–19, 21–19 | (gold) Winner | |
| 2022 | Indonesia Open | Super 1000 | (Japan) Yuta Watanabe | (China) Zheng Siwei (China) Huang Yaqiong | 14–21, 16–21 | (silver) Runner-up | |
| 2022 | Japan Open | Super 750 | (Japan) Yuta Watanabe | (Thailand) Dechapol Puavaranukroh (Thailand) Sapsiree Taerattanachai | 21–16, 21–23, 18–21 | (silver) Runner-up | |
| 2023 | Malaysia Open | Super 1000 | (Japan) Yuta Watanabe | (China) Zheng Siwei (China) Huang Yaqiong | 19–21, 11–21 | (silver) Runner-up | |
| 2023 | India Open | Super 750 | (Japan) Yuta Watanabe | (China) Wang Yilyu (China) Huang Dongping | Walkover | (gold) Winner | |
| 2023 | Singapore Open | Super 750 | (Japan) Yuta Watanabe | (Denmark) Mathias Christiansen (Denmark) Alexandra Bøje | 14–21, 22–20, 16–21 | (silver) Runner-up | |
| 2023 | Indonesia Open | Super 1000 | (Japan) Yuta Watanabe | (China) Zheng Siwei (China) Huang Yaqiong | 14–21, 11–21 | (silver) Runner-up | |
| 2023 | Japan Open | Super 750 | (Japan) Yuta Watanabe | (Thailand) Dechapol Puavaranukroh (Thailand) Sapsiree Taerattanachai | 17–21, 21–16, 21–15 | (gold) Winner | |
| 2024 | Malaysia Open | Super 1000 | (Japan) Yuta Watanabe | (South Korea) Kim Won-ho (South Korea) Jeong Na-eun | 21–18, 21–15 | (gold) Winner | |
| 2024 | All England Open | Super 1000 | (Japan) Yuta Watanabe | (China) Zheng Siwei (China) Huang Yaqiong | 16–21, 11–21 | (silver) Runner-up | |

=== BWF Grand Prix (1 runner-up) ===
The BWF Grand Prix had two levels, the Grand Prix and Grand Prix Gold. It was a series of badminton tournaments sanctioned by the Badminton World Federation (BWF) and played between 2007 and 2017.

Mixed doubles
| Year | Tournament | Partner | Opponent | Score | Result | Ref. |
|---|---|---|---|---|---|---|
| 2015 | Russian Open | (Japan) Yuta Watanabe | (Malaysia) Chan Peng Soon (Malaysia) Goh Liu Ying | 13–21, 21–23 | (silver) Runner-up | |

BWF Grand Prix tournament

=== BWF International Challenge/Series (1 title) ===
Mixed doubles
| Year | Tournament | Partner | Opponent | Score | Result | Ref. |
|---|---|---|---|---|---|---|
| 2016 | Vietnam International | (Japan) Yuta Watanabe | (Thailand) Tinn Isriyanet (Thailand) Pacharapun Chochuwong | 21–16, 21–14 | (gold) Winner | |

BWF International Challenge tournament
