= Badminton at the 2024 Summer Olympics – Mixed doubles =

Mixed doubles at the Games of the XXXIII Olympiad
- Venue: Porte de La Chapelle Arena
- Date: 27 July – 2 August 2024
- Competitors: 30 from 13 nations
- Teams: 15

Medalists
1st place, gold medalist(s)		Zheng Siwei; Huang Yaqiong	China
2nd place, silver medalist(s)		Kim Won-ho; Jeong Na-eun	South Korea
3rd place, bronze medalist(s)		Yuta Watanabe; Arisa Higashino	Japan

The mixed doubles badminton tournament at the 2024 Summer Olympics took place from 27 July to 2 August at the Porte de La Chapelle Arena in Paris. There were 15 pairs (30 players) from 13 nations competing.

China's Zheng Siwei and Huang Yaqiong, whom were the silver medalists in the mixed doubles event in 2020, defeated South Korea's Kim Won-ho and Jeong Na-eun in the final, 21–8, 21–11, to win the gold medal in mixed doubles badminton at the 2024 Summer Olympics. Zheng and Huang did not lose a game during the tournament, becoming the first mixed pair to achieve this feat since Tontowi Ahmad and Liliyana Natsir in 2016. Their win led China to claim their fifth gold medal in the mixed doubles discipline since badminton debuted as an official sport in the Olympics in 1992.

Defending bronze medalists Yuta Watanabe and Arisa Higashino of Japan defeated South Korea's Seo Seung-jae and Chae Yoo-jung 21–13, 22–20 to win Japan's second consecutive bronze medal in the mixed doubles event at the Olympics.

Chinese pair Wang Yilyu and Huang Dongping were the previous Olympic champions, but Wang retired from international badminton in June 2023. Huang partnered with Feng Yanzhe, but lost in the quarter-finals to eventual champions Zheng Siwei and Huang Yaqiong.

== Format ==
The 16 teams were split into four groups of four pairs each. Each pair played a round-robin tournament with the top-two ranked teams advancing to the knockout stage. Each match was played in a best-of-3.

== Schedule ==
The schedule was as follows.

Legend

P	Preliminaries	QF	Quarter-finals	SF	Semi-finals	M	Medal matches

27 Jul	28 Jul	29 Jul	30 Jul	31 Jul	1 Aug	2 Aug
P				QF	SF	M

== Draw ==
The group stage draw was held on 12 July 2024. The knockout stage draw was held on 29 July 2024.

== Seeds ==
The top four teams of the BWF World Ranking were seeded.

1. Zheng Siwei / Huang Yaqiong (CHN) (gold medalists)
2. Feng Yanzhe / Huang Dongping (CHN) (quarter-finals)
3. Seo Seung-jae / Chae Yoo-jung (KOR) (fourth place)
4. Yuta Watanabe / Arisa Higashino (JPN) (bronze medalists)

== Group stage ==
All times are local (UTC+2).

=== Group A ===
Pos	Team	Pld	W	L	GF	GA	GD	PF	PA	PD	Pts	Qualification
1	Zheng Siwei / Huang Yaqiong (CHN)	3	3	0	6	0	+6	128	75	+53	3	Quarter-finals
2	Kim Won-ho / Jeong Na-eun (KOR)	3	1	2	3	4	−1	130	135	−5	1	Quarter-finals
3	Thom Gicquel / Delphine Delrue (FRA) (H)	3	1	2	2	4	−2	113	115	−2	1	
4	Rinov Rivaldy / Pitha Haningtyas Mentari (INA)	3	1	2	2	5	−3	98	144	−46	1	

Source: Olympics
(H) Host

Date	Time	Player 1	Score	Player 2	Set 1	Set 2	Set 3	Report
27 July	15:40	Zheng Siwei (China); Huang Yaqiong (China)	2–0	(France) Thom Gicquel (France) Delphine Delrue	21–14	23–21		Report
27 July	15:40	Kim Won-ho (South Korea); Jeong Na-eun (South Korea)	1–2	(Indonesia) Rinov Rivaldy (Indonesia) Pitha Haningtyas Mentari	20–22	21–14	19–21	Report
28 July	14:00	Zheng Siwei (China); Huang Yaqiong (China)	2–0	(Indonesia) Rinov Rivaldy (Indonesia) Pitha Haningtyas Mentari	21–10	21–3		Report
28 July	14:50	Kim Won-ho (South Korea); Jeong Na-eun (South Korea)	2–0	(France) Thom Gicquel (France) Delphine Delrue	22–20	21–16		Report
29 July	09:20	Zheng Siwei (China); Huang Yaqiong (China)	2–0	(South Korea) Kim Won-ho (South Korea) Jeong Na-eun	21–13	21–14		Report
29 July	10:10	Rinov Rivaldy (Indonesia); Pitha Haningtyas Mentari (Indonesia)	0–2	(France) Thom Gicquel (France) Delphine Delrue	13–21	15–21		Report

=== Group B ===
Pos	Team	Pld	W	L	GF	GA	GD	PF	PA	PD	Pts	Qualification
1	Seo Seung-jae / Chae Yoo-jung (KOR)	3	3	0	6	1	+5	136	97	+39	3	Quarter-finals
2	Dechapol Puavaranukroh / Sapsiree Taerattanachai (THA)	3	2	1	5	2	+3	136	105	+31	2	Quarter-finals
3	Robin Tabeling / Selena Piek (NED)	3	1	2	2	4	−2	100	111	−11	1	
4	Koceila Mammeri / Tanina Mammeri (ALG)	3	0	3	0	6	−6	67	126	−59	0	

Source: Olympics

Date	Time	Player 1	Score	Player 2	Set 1	Set 2	Set 3	Report
27 July	08:30	Seo Seung-jae (South Korea); Chae Yoo-jung (South Korea)	2–0	(Algeria) Koceila Mammeri (Algeria) Tanina Mammeri	21–10	21–7		Report
27 July	10:00	Dechapol Puavaranukroh (Thailand); Sapsiree Taerattanachai (Thailand)	2–0	(Netherlands) Robin Tabeling (Netherlands) Selena Piek	21–14	21–16		Report
28 July	19:30	Dechapol Puavaranukroh (Thailand); Sapsiree Taerattanachai (Thailand)	2–0	(Algeria) Koceila Mammeri (Algeria) Tanina Mammeri	21–14	21–9		Report
28 July	21:10	Seo Seung-jae (South Korea); Chae Yoo-jung (South Korea)	2–0	(Netherlands) Robin Tabeling (Netherlands) Selena Piek	21–16	21–12		Report
29 July	14:00	Seo Seung-jae (South Korea); Chae Yoo-jung (South Korea)	2–1	(Thailand) Dechapol Puavaranukroh (Thailand) Sapsiree Taerattanachai	21–16	10–21	21–15	Report
29 July	15:40	Robin Tabeling (Netherlands); Selena Piek (Netherlands)	2–0	(Algeria) Koceila Mammeri (Algeria) Tanina Mammeri	21–18	21–9		Report

=== Group C ===
Pos	Team	Pld	W	L	GF	GA	GD	PF	PA	PD	Pts	Qualification
1	Yuta Watanabe / Arisa Higashino (JPN)	2	2	0	4	1	+3	98	83	+15	2	Quarter-finals
2	Tang Chun Man / Tse Ying Suet (HKG)	2	1	1	3	2	+1	98	82	+16	1	Quarter-finals
3	Ye Hong-wei / Lee Chia-hsin (TPE)	2	0	2	0	4	−4	53	84	−31	0	
4	Mathias Christiansen / Alexandra Bøje (DEN) (Note: Mathias Christiansen withdrew before the tournament.)	0	0	0	0	0	0	0	0	0	0	Withdrew

Source: Olympics
Notes:

Date	Time	Player 1	Score	Player 2	Set 1	Set 2	Set 3	Report
27 July	14:00	Tang Chun Man (Hong Kong); Tse Ying Suet (Hong Kong)	2–0	(Chinese Taipei) Ye Hong-wei (Chinese Taipei) Lee Chia-hsin	21–13	21–13		Report
28 July	21:10	Yuta Watanabe (Japan); Arisa Higashino (Japan)	2–0	(Chinese Taipei) Ye Hong-wei (Chinese Taipei) Lee Chia-hsin	21–14	21–13		Report
29 July	20:20	Yuta Watanabe (Japan); Arisa Higashino (Japan)	2–1	(Hong Kong) Tang Chun Man (Hong Kong) Tse Ying Suet	21–17	14–21	21–18	Report

=== Group D ===
Pos	Team	Pld	W	L	GF	GA	GD	PF	PA	PD	Pts	Qualification
1	Chen Tang Jie / Toh Ee Wei (MAS)	3	3	0	6	1	+5	148	122	+26	3	Quarter-finals
2	Feng Yanzhe / Huang Dongping (CHN)	3	2	1	5	2	+3	136	114	+22	2	Quarter-finals
3	Terry Hee / Jessica Tan (SGP)	3	1	2	2	4	−2	105	115	−10	1	
4	Vinson Chiu / Jennie Gai (USA)	3	0	3	0	6	−6	91	129	−38	0	

Source: Olympics

Date	Time	Player 1	Score	Player 2	Set 1	Set 2	Set 3	Report
27 July	08:30	Feng Yanzhe (China); Huang Dongping (China)	2–0	(United States) Vinson Chiu (United States) Jennie Gai	21–11	21–14		Report
27 July	09:20	Chen Tang Jie (Malaysia); Toh Ee Wei (Malaysia)	2–0	(Singapore) Terry Hee (Singapore) Jessica Tan	23–21	21–12		Report
28 July	08:30	Feng Yanzhe (China); Huang Dongping (China)	2–0	(Singapore) Terry Hee (Singapore) Jessica Tan	21–13	21–17		Report
28 July	11:00	Chen Tang Jie (Malaysia); Toh Ee Wei (Malaysia)	2–0	(United States) Vinson Chiu (United States) Jennie Gai	21–15	24–22		Report
29 July	08:30	Feng Yanzhe (China); Huang Dongping (China)	1–2	(Malaysia) Chen Tang Jie (Malaysia) Toh Ee Wei	21–17	15–21	16–21	Report
29 July	11:00	Terry Hee (Singapore); Jessica Tan (Singapore)	2–0	(United States) Vinson Chiu (United States) Jennie Gai	21–17	21–12		Report

== Knockout stage ==
Quarter-finals
Zheng Siwei (CHN); Huang Yaqiong (CHN)	21	21
Feng Yanzhe (CHN); Huang Dongping (CHN)	16	15
Yuta Watanabe (JPN); Arisa Higashino (JPN)	23	21
Dechapol Puavaranukroh (THA); Sapsiree Taerattanachai (THA)	21	14
Tang Chun Man (HKG); Tse Ying Suet (HKG)	15	10
Seo Seung-jae (KOR); Chae Yoo-jung (KOR)	21	21
Kim Won-ho (KOR); Jeong Na-eun (KOR)	21	21
Chen Tang Jie (MAS); Toh Ee Wei (MAS)	19	14

Semi-finals
Zheng Siwei (CHN); Huang Yaqiong (CHN)	21	21
Yuta Watanabe (JPN); Arisa Higashino (JPN)	14	15
Seo Seung-jae (KOR); Chae Yoo-jung (KOR)	16	22	21
Kim Won-ho (KOR); Jeong Na-eun (KOR)	21	20	23

Gold medal match
Zheng Siwei (CHN); Huang Yaqiong (CHN)	21	21
Kim Won-ho (KOR); Jeong Na-eun (KOR)	8	11
Bronze medal match
Yuta Watanabe (JPN); Arisa Higashino (JPN)	21	22
Seo Seung-jae (KOR); Chae Yoo-jung (KOR)	13	20
