= 2026 BWF World Championships – Men's doubles =

Badminton championships

Men's doubles at the 2026 BWF World Championships
- Venue: Indira Gandhi Arena
- Location: New Delhi, India
- Dates: 17–23 August
- Competitors: 48 from 27 nations

Medalists
gold medal	Liang Weikeng; Wang Chang	China
silver medal	Aaron Chia; Soh Wooi Yik	Malaysia
bronze medal	Kim Won-ho; Seo Seung-jae	South Korea
bronze medal	Lee Jhe-huei; Yang Po-hsuan	Chinese Taipei

The Men's doubles tournament of the 2026 BWF World Championships is currently taking place from 17 to 23 August 2026 at the Indira Gandhi Arena in New Delhi.

== Seeds ==
The seeding list was based on the World Rankings of 31 July 2026.

1. (South Korea) Kim Won-ho / Seo Seung-jae (semi-finals)
2. (Indonesia) Fajar Alfian / Muhammad Shohibul Fikri (quarter-finals)
3. (China) Liang Weikeng / Wang Chang (champions)
4. (Malaysia) Aaron Chia / Soh Wooi Yik (final)
5. (India) Satwiksairaj Rankireddy / Chirag Shetty (quarter-finals)
6. (Malaysia) Goh Sze Fei / Nur Izzuddin (quarter-finals)
7. (China) Chen Boyang / Liu Yi (second round)
8. (Japan) Takuro Hoki / Yugo Kobayashi (withdrew)
9. (Indonesia) Sabar Karyaman Gutama / Muhammad Reza Pahlevi Isfahani (third round)
10. (England) Ben Lane / Sean Vendy (third round)
11. (Malaysia) Man Wei Chong / Tee Kai Wun (third round)
12. (Indonesia) Raymond Indra / Nikolaus Joaquin (second round)
13. (Denmark) Daniel Lundgaard / Mads Vestergaard (third round)
14. (Chinese Taipei) Chiu Hsiang-chieh / Wang Chi-lin (third round)
15. (South Korea) Kang Min-hyuk / Ki Dong-ju (third round)
16. (Denmark) Kim Astrup / Anders Skaarup Rasmussen (third round)

== Draw ==
The drawing ceremony was held on 5 August.

=== Finals ===
Semi-finals
1	(South Korea) Kim Won-ho (South Korea) Seo Seung-jae	17	18
4	(Malaysia) Aaron Chia (Malaysia) Soh Wooi Yik	21	21
3	(China) Liang Weikeng (China) Wang Chang	21	21
SWM	(Chinese Taipei) Lee Jhe-huei (Chinese Taipei) Yang Po-hsuan	18	14

Final
4	(Malaysia) Aaron Chia (Malaysia) Soh Wooi Yik	17	16
3	(China) Liang Weikeng (China) Wang Chang	21	21

=== Top half ===
==== Section 1 ====
First round
(France) C Popov (France) T J Popov	13	17
(Japan) T Nomura (Japan) Y Shimogami	21	21
(Philippines) S Padiz Jr. (Philippines) J Villabrille	19	11
(Singapore) D Wee (Singapore) H Wong	21	21
(Scotland) C Grimley (Scotland) M Grimley	21	19	21
(Canada) K Lee (Canada) T A Lindeman	17	21	10
(Japan) K Kumagai (Japan) H Nishi	21	18	21
(Chinese Taipei) Lee F-j (Chinese Taipei) Lee F-c	12	21	18

Second round
1	(South Korea) Kim W-h (South Korea) Seo S-j	21	21
(Japan) T Nomura (Japan) Y Shimogami	16	13
10	(England) B Lane (England) S Vendy	21	19	21
(Singapore) D Wee (Singapore) H Wong	16	21	12
6	(Malaysia) Goh S F (Malaysia) N Izzuddin	21	15	21
(Scotland) C Grimley (Scotland) M Grimley	11	21	16
14	(Chinese Taipei) Chiu H-c (Chinese Taipei) Wang C-l	21	21
(Japan) K Kumagai (Japan) H Nishi	14	14

Third round
1	(South Korea) Kim W-h (South Korea) Seo S-j	21	21
10	(England) B Lane (England) S Vendy	13	16
6	(Malaysia) Goh S F (Malaysia) N Izzuddin	21	21
14	(Chinese Taipei) Chiu H-c (Chinese Taipei) Wang C-l	17	17

Quarter-finals
1	(South Korea) Kim W-h (South Korea) Seo S-j	21	21
6	(Malaysia) Goh S F (Malaysia) N Izzuddin	16	16

==== Section 2 ====
First round
(Germany) J Dresp (Germany) S Krax	12	21	11
(Thailand) P Sukphun (Thailand) Pak Teeraratsakul	21	15	21
(United States) Chen Z-y (United States) P Smith	14	16
PFR	(China) Huang D (China) Liu Ya	21	21
PFR	(China) Hu KY (China) Lin XY	21	21
(Switzerland) Y Orteu (Switzerland) M Q Pham	6	10
(Sweden) M Molin (Sweden) M Svensson	14	20
(Brazil) F Farias (Brazil) D Silva	21	22

Second round
4	(Malaysia) A Chia (Malaysia) Soh W Y	15	21	21
(Thailand) P Sukphun (Thailand) Pak Teeraratsakul	21	11	18
11	(Malaysia) Man W C (Malaysia) Tee K W	21	21
PFR	(China) Huang D (China) Liu Ya	14	15
7	(China) Chen BY (China) Liu Yi	18	18
PFR	(China) Hu KY (China) Lin XY	21	21
13	(Denmark) D Lundgaard (Denmark) M Vestergaard	21	21
(Brazil) F Farias (Brazil) D Silva	14	11

Third round
4	(Malaysia) A Chia (Malaysia) Soh W Y	w	/	o
11	(Malaysia) Man W C (Malaysia) Tee K W
PFR	(China) Hu KY (China) Lin XY	21	16	21
13	(Denmark) D Lundgaard (Denmark) M Vestergaard	14	21	16

Quarter-finals
4	(Malaysia) A Chia (Malaysia) Soh W Y	21	21
PFR	(China) Hu KY (China) Lin XY	11	17

=== Bottom half ===
==== Section 3 ====
First round
(Vietnam) Nguyễn Đ H (Vietnam) Trần Đ M	9	13
(Malaysia) J Arif (Malaysia) Yap R K	21	21
(Scotland) A Dunn (Scotland) A Pringle	21	21
(Thailand) C Charoenkitamorn (Thailand) W Thongsa-nga	10	19
(Germany) B Geiss (Germany) J R Jansen	21	12	16
(Singapore) W Koh (Singapore) J Kubo	16	21	21
(Individual Neutral Athletes) R Alimov (Individual Neutral Athletes) M Ogloblin	19	14
(England) A Green (England) Z Russ	21	21

Second round
(Malaysia) J Arif (Malaysia) Yap R K	21	21
12	(Indonesia) R Indra (Indonesia) N Joaquin	16	19
(Scotland) A Dunn (Scotland) A Pringle
5	(India) S Rankireddy (India) C Shetty	w	/	o
(Singapore) W Koh (Singapore) J Kubo	16	8
16	(Denmark) K Astrup (Denmark) A S Rasmussen	21	21
(England) A Green (England) Z Russ	22	12	18
3	(China) Liang WK (China) Wang C	20	21	21

Third round
(Malaysia) J Arif (Malaysia) Yap R K	23	19	17
5	(India) S Rankireddy (India) C Shetty	21	21	21
16	(Denmark) K Astrup (Denmark) A S Rasmussen	20	21	19
3	(China) Liang WK (China) Wang C	22	8	21

Quarter-finals
5	(India) S Rankireddy (India) C Shetty	18	9
3	(China) Liang WK (China) Wang C	21	21

==== Section 4 ====
First round
(Czech Republic) J Král (Czech Republic) O Král	21	21
(Canada) J Lai (Canada) N Yakura	13	10
(Hong Kong) Hung K C (Hong Kong) Lui C W	21	21
(Czech Republic) V Havlíček (Czech Republic) T Švejda	15	13
(Republic of Ireland) S Guildea (Republic of Ireland) P Reynolds	16	4^{r}
(India) H Amsakarunan (India) Arjun M. R.	21	6
(France) É Adam (France) L Rossi	21	21
(Spain) J Fernández (Spain) A Perals	8	13

Second round
(Czech Republic) J Král (Czech Republic) O Král	12	16
SWM	(Chinese Taipei) Lee J-h (Chinese Taipei) Yang P-h	21	21
(Hong Kong) Hung K C (Hong Kong) Lui C W	20	21	15
9	(Indonesia) S K Gutama (Indonesia) M R P Isfahani	22	14	21
(India) H Amsakarunan (India) Arjun M. R.	17	14
15	(South Korea) Kang M-h (South Korea) Ki D-j	21	21
(France) É Adam (France) L Rossi	14	13
2	(Indonesia) F Alfian (Indonesia) M S Fikri	21	21

Third round
SWM	(Chinese Taipei) Lee J-h (Chinese Taipei) Yang P-h	21	21
9	(Indonesia) S K Gutama (Indonesia) M R P Isfahani	11	13
15	(South Korea) Kang M-h (South Korea) Ki D-j	15	21	12
2	(Indonesia) F Alfian (Indonesia) M S Fikri	21	14	21

Quarter-finals
SWM	(Chinese Taipei) Lee J-h (Chinese Taipei) Yang P-h	21	21
2	(Indonesia) F Alfian (Indonesia) M S Fikri	19	16
