= Kim Won-ho =

South Korean badminton player (born 1999)

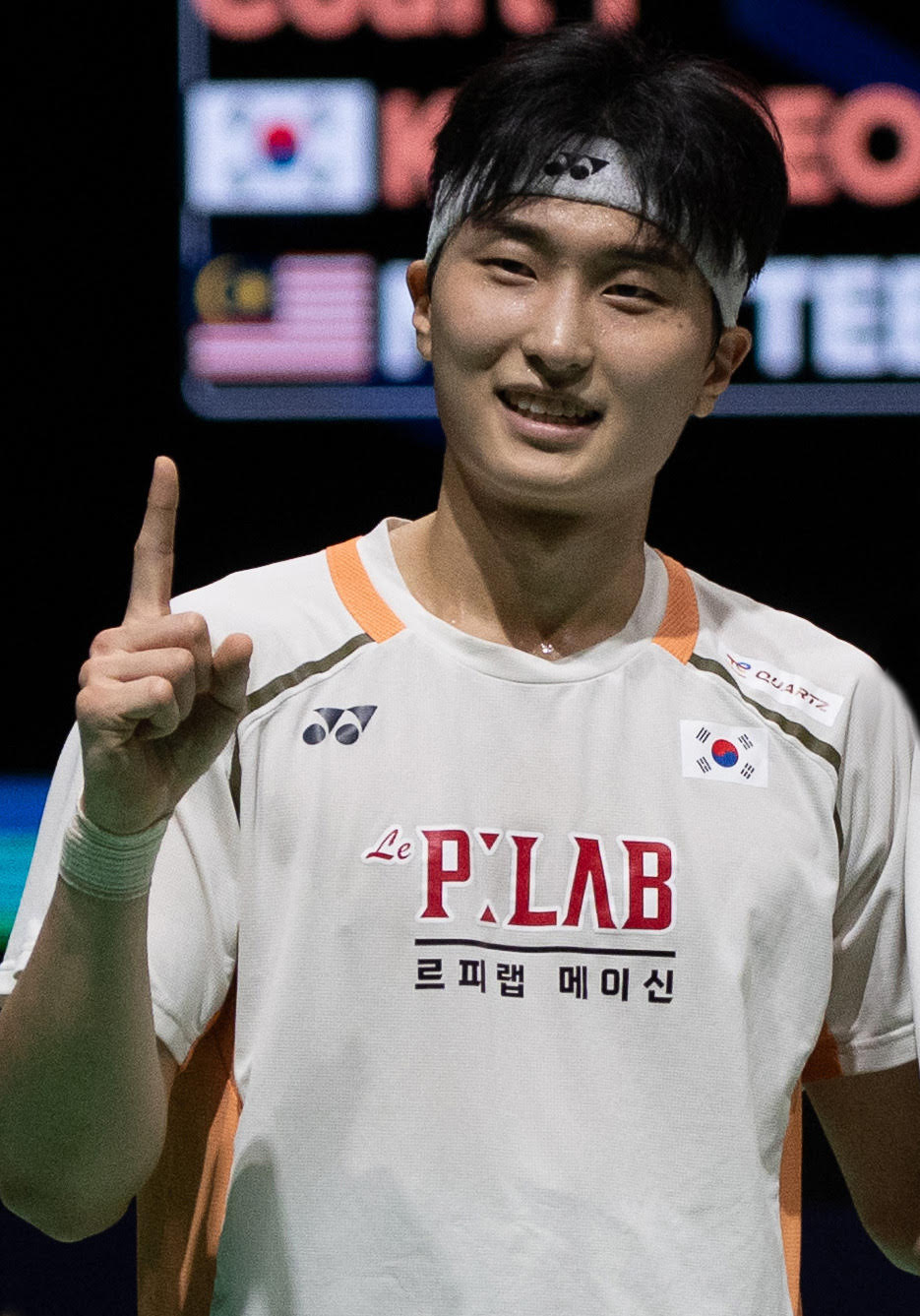
- Kim Won-ho at the Malaysia Open 2026

Personal information
- Born: 2 June 1999 (age 27) Suwon, South Korea
- Height: 1.84 m (6 ft 0 in)

Sport
- Country: South Korea
- Sport: Badminton
- Handedness: Right

Men's & mixed doubles
- Highest ranking: 1 (MD with Seo Seung-jae, 22 July 2025); 9 (MD with Choi Sol-gyu, 3 January 2023); 3 (XD with Jeong Na-eun, 31 December 2024)
- Current ranking: 1 (MD with Seo Seung-jae, 10 November 2026)
- BWF profile
Medal record
Men's badminton
Representing South Korea
Olympic Games
Silver medal – second place	2024 Paris	Mixed doubles
World Championships
Gold medal – first place	2025 Paris	Men's doubles
Bronze medal – third place	2026 New Delhi	Men's doubles
Sudirman Cup
Gold medal – first place	2017 Gold Coast	Mixed team
Silver medal – second place	2023 Suzhou	Mixed team
Silver medal – second place	2025 Xiamen	Mixed team
Bronze medal – third place	2021 Vantaa	Mixed team
Asian Games
Silver medal – second place	2022 Hangzhou	Men's doubles
Bronze medal – third place	2022 Hangzhou	Men's team
Bronze medal – third place	2026 Aichi–Nagoya	Men's doubles
Asia Championships
Gold medal – first place	2026 Ningbo	Men's doubles
Bronze medal – third place	2019 Wuhan	Men's doubles
Asia Mixed Team Championships
Silver medal – second place	2023 Dubai	Mixed team
Asia Team Championships
Bronze medal – third place	2018 Alor Setar	Men's team
Bronze medal – third place	2024 Selangor	Men's team
Bronze medal – third place	2026 Qingdao	Men's team
World Junior Championships
Bronze medal – third place	2017 Yogyakarta	Boys' doubles
Bronze medal – third place	2017 Yogyakarta	Mixed team
Asian Junior Championships
Silver medal – second place	2016 Bangkok	Mixed doubles
Silver medal – second place	2016 Bangkok	Mixed team

Kim Won-ho (Korean: 김원호; born 2 June 1999) is a South Korean badminton player. He is the 2025 World and 2026 Asian Champions in the men's doubles, having also won the silver medals in the mixed doubles at the 2024 Summer Olympics and in the men's doubles at the 2022 Asian Games. He was part of Korea winning team at the 2017 Sudirman Cup. Kim reached a career-high as world number 1 in men's doubles with Seo Seung-jae and world number 3 in mixed doubles with Jeong Na-eun.

Kim is the son of the Olympic gold medalist Gil Young-ah. When he was educated in the Maewon High School, he competed at the 2016 Asian Junior Championships, and won the silver medals in the mixed doubles and team event. He was also a bronze medalist at the 2017 World Junior Championships in the boys' doubles and team event. He was the youngest player from the Korean national team who competed at the 2017 Sudirman Cup. He played one match, in the opening tie with Russia in the round robin stage. In the final round, Korea won the title after beating China by the score of 3–2.

In 2025, Kim Won-ho, with his partner Seo Seung-jae, set the record for the most single-season victories in a calendar year with 11 titles in the BWF World Tour men’s doubles category, including the World Championships and the BWF World Tour Finals.

With Seo, he also achieved back-to-back victories at the All England Open in 2026. This marks the first time in 40 years since the pair of Park Joo-bong and Kim Moon-soo won the men’s doubles in 1985 and 1986 that a South Korean player has accomplished this feat. He received the Sports Grand Prize, the highest honour from the Korean Sport & Olympic Committee, in March 2026.

== Achievements ==
=== Olympic Games ===
Mixed doubles
Year	Venue	Partner	Opponent	Score	Result	Ref.
2024	Porte de La Chapelle Arena, Paris, France	(South Korea) Jeong Na-eun	(China) Zheng Siwei (China) Huang Yaqiong	8–21, 11–21	Silver	

=== World Championships ===
Men's doubles
Year	Venue	Partner	Opponent	Score	Result	Ref.
2025	Adidas Arena, Paris, France	(South Korea) Seo Seung-jae	(China) Chen Boyang (China) Liu Yi	21–17, 21–12	Gold	
2026	Indira Gandhi Arena, New Delhi, India	(South Korea) Seo Seung-jae	(Malaysia) Aaron Chia (Malaysia) Soh Wooi Yik	17–21, 18–21	Bronze	

=== Asian Games ===
Men's doubles
Year	Venue	Partner	Opponent	Score	Result
2022	Binjiang Gymnasium, Hangzhou, China	(South Korea) Choi Sol-gyu	(India) Satwiksairaj Rankireddy (India) Chirag Shetty	18–21, 16–21	Silver
2026	Ichinomiya City Municipal Gymnasium, Ichinomiya, Japan	(South Korea) Seo Seung-jae	(Indonesia) Leo Rolly Carnando (Indonesia) Daniel Marthin	11–21, 14–21	Bronze

=== Asian Championships ===
Men's doubles
Year	Venue	Partner	Opponent	Score	Result
2019	Wuhan Sports Center Gymnasium, Wuhan, China	(South Korea) Kang Min-hyuk	(Japan) Hiroyuki Endo (Japan) Yuta Watanabe	17–21, 22–20, 25–27	Bronze
2026	Ningbo Olympic Sports Center Gymnasium, Ningbo, China	(South Korea) Seo Seung-jae	(South Korea) Kang Min-hyuk (South Korea) Ki Dong-ju	21–13, 21–17	Gold

=== World Junior Championships ===
Boys' doubles
Year	Venue	Partner	Opponent	Score	Result
2017	GOR Among Rogo, Yogyakarta, Indonesia	(South Korea) Kang Min-hyuk	(Japan) Mahiro Kaneko (Japan) Yunosuke Kubota	21–19, 17–21, 19–21	Bronze

=== Asian Junior Championships ===
Mixed doubles
Year	Venue	Partner	Opponent	Score	Result
2016	CPB Badminton Training Center, Bangkok, Thailand	(South Korea) Lee Yu-rim	(China) He Jiting (China) Du Yue	12–21, 21–19, 19–21	Silver

=== BWF World Tour (15 titles, 12 runners-up) ===
The BWF World Tour, which was announced on 19 March 2017 and implemented in 2018, is a series of elite badminton tournaments sanctioned by the Badminton World Federation (BWF). The BWF World Tour is divided into levels of World Tour Finals, Super 1000, Super 750, Super 500, Super 300, and the BWF Tour Super 100.

Men's doubles
Year	Tournament	Level	Partner	Opponent	Score	Result
2018	U.S. Open	Super 300	(South Korea) Kang Min-hyuk	(China) Ou Xuanyi (China) Ren Xiangyu	21–16, 16–21, 17–21	(silver) Runner-up
2019	Spain Masters	Super 300	(South Korea) Seo Seung-jae	(Chinese Taipei) Lee Yang (Chinese Taipei) Wang Chi-lin	8–21, 21–23	(silver) Runner-up
2022	Indonesia Open	Super 1000	(South Korea) Choi Sol-gyu	(China) Liu Yuchen (China) Ou Xuanyi	17–21, 21–23	(silver) Runner-up
2023	German Open	Super 300	(South Korea) Choi Sol-gyu	(South Korea) Kang Min-hyuk (South Korea) Seo Seung-jae	21–19, 18–21, 21–19	(gold) Winner
2024	Korea Masters	Super 300	(South Korea) Jin Yong	(Malaysia) Aaron Chia (Malaysia) Soh Wooi Yik	23–21, 19–21, 14–21	(silver) Runner-up
2025	Malaysia Open	Super 1000	(South Korea) Seo Seung-jae	(China) Chen Boyang (China) Liu Yi	19–21, 21–12, 21–12	(gold) Winner
2025	India Open	Super 750	(South Korea) Seo Seung-jae	(Malaysia) Goh Sze Fei (Malaysia) Nur Izzuddin	15–21, 21–13, 16–21	(silver) Runner-up
2025	German Open	Super 300	(South Korea) Seo Seung-jae	(France) Christo Popov (France) Toma Junior Popov	21–19, 21–17	(gold) Winner
2025	All England Open	Super 1000	(South Korea) Seo Seung-jae	(Indonesia) Leo Rolly Carnando (Indonesia) Bagas Maulana	21–19, 21–19	(gold) Winner
2025	Singapore Open	Super 750	(South Korea) Seo Seung-jae	(Malaysia) Aaron Chia (Malaysia) Soh Wooi Yik	21–15, 18–21, 19–21	(silver) Runner-up
2025	Indonesia Open	Super 1000	(South Korea) Seo Seung-jae	(Indonesia) Sabar Karyaman Gutama (Indonesia) Muhammad Reza Pahlevi Isfahani	18–21, 21–19, 21–12	(gold) Winner
2025	Japan Open	Super 750	(South Korea) Seo Seung-jae	(Malaysia) Goh Sze Fei (Malaysia) Nur Izzuddin	21–16, 21–17	(gold) Winner
2025	China Masters	Super 750	(South Korea) Seo Seung-jae	(India) Satwiksairaj Rankireddy (India) Chirag Shetty	21–19, 21–15	(gold) Winner
2025	Korea Open	Super 500	(South Korea) Seo Seung-jae	(Indonesia) Fajar Alfian (Indonesia) Muhammad Shohibul Fikri	21–16, 23–21	(gold) Winner
2025	French Open	Super 750	(South Korea) Seo Seung-jae	(Indonesia) Fajar Alfian (Indonesia) Muhammad Shohibul Fikri	10–21, 21–13, 21–12	(gold) Winner
2025	Japan Masters	Super 500	(South Korea) Seo Seung-jae	(Japan) Hiroki Midorikawa (Japan) Kyohei Yamashita	20–22, 21–11, 21–16	(gold) Winner
2025	BWF World Tour Finals	World Tour Finals	(South Korea) Seo Seung-jae	(China) Liang Weikeng (China) Wang Chang	21–18, 21–14	(gold) Winner
2026	Malaysia Open	Super 1000	(South Korea) Seo Seung-jae	(Malaysia) Aaron Chia (Malaysia) Soh Wooi Yik	21–15, 12–21, 21–18	(gold) Winner
2026	All England Open	Super 1000	(South Korea) Seo Seung-jae	(Malaysia) Aaron Chia (Malaysia) Soh Wooi Yik	18–21, 21–12, 21–19	(gold) Winner
2026	Japan Open	Super 750	(South Korea) Seo Seung-jae	(Indonesia) Fajar Alfian (Indonesia) Muhammad Shohibul Fikri	19–21, 17–21	(silver) Runner-up
2026	China Open	Super 1000	(South Korea) Seo Seung-jae	(Indonesia) Fajar Alfian (Indonesia) Muhammad Shohibul Fikri	21–16, 19–21, 19–21	(silver) Runner-up
2026	Korea Open	Super 500	(South Korea) Seo Seung-jae	(Japan) Takuro Hoki (Japan) Yugo Kobayashi	21–12, 20–22, 21–19	(gold) Winner

Mixed doubles
Year	Tournament	Level	Partner	Opponent	Score	Result
2022	Australian Open	Super 300	(South Korea) Jeong Na-eun	(South Korea) Seo Seung-jae (South Korea) Chae Yoo-jung	9–21, 17–21	(silver) Runner-up
2023	German Open	Super 300	(South Korea) Jeong Na-eun	(China) Feng Yanzhe (China) Huang Dongping	4–21, 15–21	(silver) Runner-up
2023	Thailand Open	Super 500	(South Korea) Jeong Na-eun	(Thailand) Dechapol Puavaranukroh (Thailand) Sapsiree Taerattanachai	11–21, 21–19, 22–20	(gold) Winner
2024	Malaysia Open	Super 1000	(South Korea) Jeong Na-eun	(Japan) Yuta Watanabe (Japan) Arisa Higashino	18–21, 15–21	(silver) Runner-up
2024	German Open	Super 300	(South Korea) Jeong Na-eun	(Hong Kong) Tang Chun Man (Hong Kong) Tse Ying Suet	13–21, 19–21	(silver) Runner-up

=== BWF Grand Prix (2 titles, 3 runners-up) ===
The BWF Grand Prix had two levels, the Grand Prix and Grand Prix Gold. It was a series of badminton tournaments sanctioned by the Badminton World Federation (BWF) and played between 2007 and 2017.

Men's doubles
Year	Tournament	Partner	Opponent	Score	Result
2017	Canada Open	(South Korea) Seo Seung-jae	(England) Peter Briggs (England) Tom Wolfenden	20–22, 21–16, 19–21	(silver) Runner-up
2017	Macau Open	(South Korea) Seo Seung-jae	(Indonesia) Wahyu Nayaka (Indonesia) Ade Yusuf	13–21, 14–21	(silver) Runner-up
2017	Korea Masters	(South Korea) Seo Seung-jae	(South Korea) Jung Jae-wook (South Korea) Kim Gi-jung	21–15, 21–16	(gold) Winner

Mixed doubles
Year	Tournament	Partner	Opponent	Score	Result
2017	Canada Open	(South Korea) Shin Seung-chan	(South Korea) Choi Sol-gyu (South Korea) Chae Yoo-jung	21–19, 21–16	(gold) Winner
2017	U.S. Open	(South Korea) Shin Seung-chan	(South Korea) Seo Seung-jae (South Korea) Kim Ha-na	21–16, 14–21, 11–21	(silver) Runner-up

BWF Grand Prix Gold tournament
BWF Grand Prix tournament

=== BWF International Challenge/Series (3 titles) ===
Men's doubles
Year	Tournament	Partner	Opponent	Score	Result
2019	Mongolia International	(South Korea) Park Kyung-hoon	(South Korea) Kang Min-hyuk (South Korea) Kim Jae-hwan	14–21, 29–27, 21–14	(gold) Winner

Mixed doubles
Year	Tournament	Partner	Opponent	Score	Result
2018	Osaka International	(South Korea) Lee Yu-rim	(Japan) Yunosuke Kubota (Japan) Chiharu Shida	21–17, 21–12	(gold) Winner
2019	Osaka International	(South Korea) Jeong Na-eun	(China) Guo Xinwa (China) Zhang Shuxian	21–17, 21–15	(gold) Winner

BWF International Challenge tournament
BWF International Series tournament
