= Yang Po-hsuan =

Taiwanese badminton player (born 1996)

Yang Po-hsuan 楊博軒
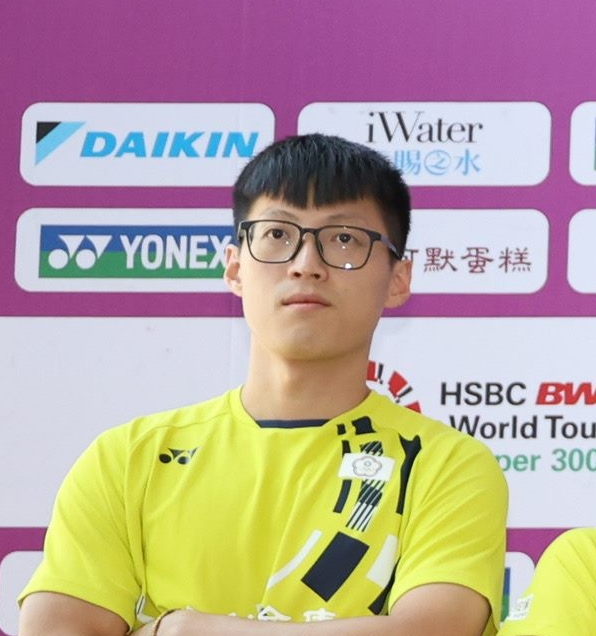
- Yang in 2024

Personal information
- Born: 23 August 1996 (age 30) Tainan, Taiwan
- Height: 1.86 m (6 ft 1 in)

Sport
- Country: Taiwan
- Sport: Badminton
- Handedness: Right

Men's & mixed doubles
- Highest ranking: 7 (MD with Lee Jhe-huei 21 January 2025); 6 (XD with Hu Ling-fang 11 March 2025)
- Current ranking: 15 (MD with Lee Jhe-huei); 11 (XD with Hu Ling-fang) (17 November 2026)
- BWF profile
Medal record
Men's badminton
Representing Chinese Taipei
World Championships
Bronze medal – third place	2026 New Delhi	Men's doubles
Thomas Cup
Bronze medal – third place	2024 Chengdu	Men's team
Asian Championships
Bronze medal – third place	2024 Ningbo	Men's doubles
Summer Universiade
Gold medal – first place	2017 Taipei	Mixed team

Yang Po-hsuan (Chinese: 楊博軒; pinyin: Yáng Bóxuān; born 23 August 1996) is a Taiwanese badminton player. He was part of the national university team that won the gold medal at the 2017 Summer Universiade.

== Achievements ==
=== World Championships ===
Men's doubles
Year	Venue	Partner	Opponent	Score	Result	Ref.
2026	Indira Gandhi Arena, New Delhi, India	(Chinese Taipei) Lee Jhe-huei	(China) Liang Weikeng (China) Wang Chang	18–21, 14–21	Bronze	

=== Asian Championships ===
Men's doubles
Year	Venue	Partner	Opponent	Score	Result
2024	Ningbo Olympic Sports Center Gymnasium; Ningbo, China	(Chinese Taipei) Lee Jhe-huei	(China) Liang Weikeng (China) Wang Chang	17–21, 17–21	Bronze

=== BWF World Tour (4 titles, 9 runners-up) ===
The BWF World Tour, which was announced on 19 March 2017 and implemented in 2018, is a series of elite badminton tournaments, sanctioned by Badminton World Federation (BWF). The BWF World Tour is divided into six levels, namely World Tour Finals, Super 1000, Super 750, Super 500, Super 300 (part of the HSBC World Tour), and the BWF Tour Super 100.

Men's doubles
Year	Tournament	Level	Partner	Opponent	Score	Result
2018	Vietnam Open	Super 100	(Chinese Taipei) Lee Sheng-mu	(South Korea) Ko Sung-hyun (South Korea) Shin Baek-cheol	20–22, 18–21	(silver) Runner-up
2019	Lingshui China Masters	Super 100	(Chinese Taipei) Lee Jhe-huei	(China) Ou Xuanyi (China) Ren Xiangyu	21–17, 21–16	(gold) Winner
2022	Hylo Open	Super 300	(Chinese Taipei) Lee Jhe-huei	(Chinese Taipei) Lu Ching-yao (Chinese Taipei) Yang Po-han	21–11, 17–21, 23–25	(silver) Runner-up
2023	Kaohsiung Masters	Super 100	(Chinese Taipei) Lee Jhe-huei	(Malaysia) Goh Sze Fei (Malaysia) Nur Izzuddin	14–21, 10–21	(silver) Runner-up
2023	Korea Masters	Super 300	(Chinese Taipei) Lee Jhe-huei	(Chinese Taipei) Lee Yang (Chinese Taipei) Wang Chi-lin	21–17, 21–19	(gold) Winner
2024	German Open	Super 300	(Chinese Taipei) Lee Jhe-huei	(China) He Jiting (China) Ren Xiangyu	15–21, 23–21, 23–21	(gold) Winner
2024	French Open	Super 750	(Chinese Taipei) Lee Jhe-huei	(India) Satwiksairaj Rankireddy (India) Chirag Shetty	11–21, 17–21	(silver) Runner-up
2024	Taipei Open	Super 300	(Chinese Taipei) Lee Jhe-huei	(Chinese Taipei) Chiang Chien-wei (Chinese Taipei) Wu Hsuan-yi	21–7, 25–23	(gold) Winner

Mixed doubles
Year	Tournament	Level	Partner	Opponent	Score	Result
2018	Chinese Taipei Open	Super 300	(Chinese Taipei) Wu Ti-jung	(Indonesia) Alfian Eko Prasetya (Indonesia) Marsheilla Gischa Islami	15–21, 11–21	(silver) Runner-up
2024	Singapore Open	Super 750	(Chinese Taipei) Hu Ling-fang	(China) Zheng Siwei (China) Huang Yaqiong	11–21, 19–21	(silver) Runner-up
2024	Kaohsiung Masters	Super 100	(Chinese Taipei) Hu Ling-fang	(Thailand) Ruttanapak Oupthong (Thailand) Jhenicha Sudjaipraparat	18–21, 13–21	(silver) Runner-up
2024	Taipei Open	Super 300	(Chinese Taipei) Hu Ling-fang	(Thailand) Pakkapon Teeraratsakul (Thailand) Phataimas Muenwong	17–21, 19–21	(silver) Runner-up
2026	Taipei Open	Super 300	(Chinese Taipei) Hu Ling-fang	(Japan) Yuta Watanabe (Japan) Maya Taguchi	19–21, 8–21	(silver) Runner-up

=== BWF International Challenge/Series (1 title, 2 runner-up) ===
Men's doubles
Year	Tournament	Partner	Opponent	Score	Result
2016	Waikato International	(Chinese Taipei) Su Ching-heng	(Chinese Taipei) Liu Wei-chen (Chinese Taipei) Yang Po-han	20–22, 10–21	(silver) Runner-up
2019	Polish Open	(Chinese Taipei) Lee Jhe-huei	(England) Ben Lane (England) Sean Vendy	21–19, 21–16	(gold) Winner

Mixed doubles
Year	Tournament	Partner	Opponent	Score	Result
2016	Malaysia International	(Chinese Taipei) Wen Hao-yun	(Malaysia) Goh Soon Huat (Malaysia) Shevon Jemie Lai	13–21, 17–21	(silver) Runner-up

BWF International Challenge tournament
BWF International Series tournament
BWF Future Series tournament
