= Lee Jhe-huei =

Taiwanese badminton player (born 1994)

Lee Jhe-huei 李哲輝
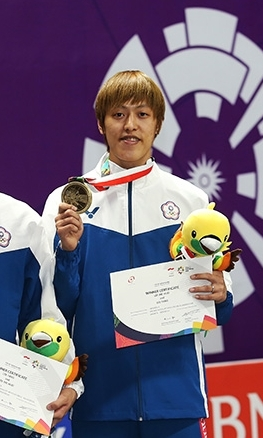
- Lee at the 2018 Asian Games

Personal information
- Born: 20 March 1994 (age 32) Taipei, Taiwan
- Height: 1.79 m (5 ft 10 in)

Sport
- Country: Republic of China (Taiwan)
- Sport: Badminton
- Handedness: Right

Men's & mixed doubles
- Highest ranking: 7 (MD with Lee Yang, 6 July 2017); 7 (MD with Yang Po-hsuan, 21 January 2025); 21 (XD with Hsu Ya-ching, 17 March 2020)
- Current ranking: 15 (MD with Yang Po-hsuan, 10 November 2026)
- BWF profile
Medal record
Men's badminton
Representing Chinese Taipei
World Championships
Bronze medal – third place	2026 New Delhi	Men's doubles
Thomas Cup
Bronze medal – third place	2024 Chengdu	Men's team
Asian Games
Bronze medal – third place	2018 Jakarta–Palembang	Men's doubles
Bronze medal – third place	2018 Jakarta–Palembang	Men's team
Asian Championships
Bronze medal – third place	2024 Ningbo	Men's doubles
Summer Universiade
Gold medal – first place	2017 Taipei	Mixed team
Bronze medal – third place	2017 Taipei	Men's doubles

Lee Jhe-huei (simplified Chinese: 李哲辉; traditional Chinese: 李哲輝; pinyin: Lǐ Zhéhuī; born 20 March 1994) is a Taiwanese badminton player.

== Career ==
He played in the men's doubles with Lee Yang. They were the champions at the 2016 Vietnam Open Grand Prix. In 2015, together they entered the 2015 Chinese Taipei Masters Grand Prix, 2015 Vietnam Open Grand Prix, and 2015 Korea Masters Grand Prix Gold. In 2016 they entered the 2016 Chinese Taipei Open Grand Prix Gold, 2016 Thailand Open Grand Prix Gold and 2016 Dutch Open Grand Prix. His best achievement is to win the men's doubles title at the 2017 French Open. In 2018, he competed at the Asian Games and won the bronze medals in the men's doubles and team events.

== Achievements ==
=== World Championships ===
Men's doubles
Year	Venue	Partner	Opponent	Score	Result
2026	Indira Gandhi Arena; New Delhi, India	(Chinese Taipei) Yang Po-hsuan	(China) Liang Weikeng (China) Wang Chang	18–21, 14–21	Bronze

=== Asian Games ===
Men's doubles
Year	Venue	Partner	Opponent	Score	Result
2018	Istora Gelora Bung Karno; Jakarta, Indonesia	(Chinese Taipei) Lee Yang	(Indonesia) Marcus Fernaldi Gideon (Indonesia) Kevin Sanjaya Sukamuljo	15–21, 22–20, 12–21	Bronze

=== Asian Championships ===
Men's doubles
Year	Venue	Partner	Opponent	Score	Result
2024	Ningbo Olympic Sports Center Gymnasium; Ningbo, China	(Chinese Taipei) Yang Po-hsuan	(China) Liang Weikeng (China) Wang Chang	17–21, 17–21	Bronze

=== Summer Universiade ===
Men's doubles
Year	Venue	Partner	Opponent	Score	Result
2017	Taipei Gymnasium; Taipei, Taiwan	(Chinese Taipei) Lee Yang	(Japan) Kenya Mitsuhashi (Japan) Katsuki Tamate	21–13, 14–21, 18–21	Bronze

=== World University Championships ===
Men's doubles
Year	Venue	Partner	Opponent	Score	Result
2016	Sports Palace "Borisoglebskiy"; Ramenskoe, Russia	(Chinese Taipei) Lee Yang	(South Korea) Choi Sol-gyu (South Korea) Kim Jae-hwan	21–19, 14–21, 17–21	Silver

=== BWF World Tour (5 titles, 4 runners-up) ===
The BWF World Tour, which was announced on 19 March 2017 and implemented in 2018, is a series of elite badminton tournaments sanctioned by the Badminton World Federation (BWF). The BWF World Tour is divided into levels of World Tour Finals, Super 1000, Super 750, Super 500, Super 300 (part of the HSBC World Tour), and the BWF Tour Super 100.

Men's doubles
Year	Tournament	Level	Partner	Opponent	Score	Result
2019	Lingshui China Masters	Super 100	(Chinese Taipei) Yang Po-hsuan	(China) Ou Xuanyi (China) Ren Xiangyu	21–17, 21–16	(gold) Winner
2022	Hylo Open	Super 300	(Chinese Taipei) Yang Po-hsuan	(Chinese Taipei) Lu Ching-yao (Chinese Taipei) Yang Po-han	21–11, 17–21, 23–25	(silver) Runner-up
2023	Kaohsiung Masters	Super 100	(Chinese Taipei) Yang Po-hsuan	(Malaysia) Goh Sze Fei (Malaysia) Nur Izzuddin	14–21, 10–21	(silver) Runner-up
2023	Korea Masters	Super 300	(Chinese Taipei) Yang Po-hsuan	(Chinese Taipei) Lee Yang (Chinese Taipei) Wang Chi-lin	21–17, 21–19	(gold) Winner
2024	German Open	Super 300	(Chinese Taipei) Yang Po-hsuan	(China) He Jiting (China) Ren Xiangyu	15–21, 23–21, 23–21	(gold) Winner
2024	French Open	Super 750	(Chinese Taipei) Yang Po-hsuan	(India) Satwiksairaj Rankireddy (India) Chirag Shetty	11–21, 17–21	(silver) Runner-up
2024	Taipei Open	Super 300	(Chinese Taipei) Yang Po-hsuan	(Chinese Taipei) Chiang Chien-wei (Chinese Taipei) Wu Hsuan-yi	21–7, 25–23	(gold) Winner

Mixed doubles
Year	Tournament	Level	Partner	Opponent	Score	Result
2019	U.S. Open	Super 300	(Chinese Taipei) Hsu Ya-ching	(France) Thom Gicquel (France) Delphine Delrue	21–17, 21–17	(gold) Winner
2019	Vietnam Open	Super 100	(Chinese Taipei) Hsu Ya-ching	(China) Guo Xinwa (China) Zhang Shuxian	21–18, 20–22, 8–21	(silver) Runner-up

=== BWF Superseries (1 title) ===
The BWF Superseries, which was launched on 14 December 2006 and implemented in 2007, was a series of elite badminton tournaments, sanctioned by the Badminton World Federation (BWF). BWF Superseries levels were Superseries and Superseries Premier. A season of Superseries consisted of twelve tournaments around the world that had been introduced since 2011. Successful players were invited to the Superseries Finals, which were held at the end of each year.

Men's doubles
Year	Tournament	Partner	Opponent	Score	Result
2017	French Open	(Chinese Taipei) Lee Yang	(Denmark) Mathias Boe (Denmark) Carsten Mogensen	21–19, 23–21	(gold) Winner

BWF Super Series tournament

=== BWF Grand Prix (3 titles, 2 runners-up) ===
The BWF Grand Prix had two levels, the Grand Prix and Grand Prix Gold. It was a series of badminton tournaments sanctioned by the Badminton World Federation (BWF) and played between 2007 and 2017.

Men's doubles
Year	Tournament	Partner	Opponent	Score	Result
2016	Vietnam Open	(Chinese Taipei) Lee Yang	(Malaysia) Koo Kien Keat (Malaysia) Tan Boon Heong	18–21, 21–14, 21–7	(gold) Winner
2016	Dutch Open	(Chinese Taipei) Lee Yang	(Denmark) Mathias Christiansen (Denmark) David Daugaard	21–17, 21–17	(gold) Winner
2016	Macau Open	(Chinese Taipei) Lee Yang	(China) Lu Kai (China) Zhang Nan	17–21, 21–18, 21–19	(gold) Winner
2016	Korea Masters	(Chinese Taipei) Lee Yang	(South Korea) Kim Jae-hwan (South Korea) Ko Sung-hyun	19–21, 18–21	(silver) Runner-up
2017	Chinese Taipei Open	(Chinese Taipei) Lee Yang	(Chinese Taipei) Chen Hung-ling (Chinese Taipei) Wang Chi-lin	16–21, 20–22	(silver) Runner-up

BWF Grand Prix Gold tournament
BWF Grand Prix tournament

=== BWF International Challenge/Series (1 title, 1 runner-up) ===
Men's doubles
Year	Tournament	Partner	Opponent	Score	Result
2015	Malaysia International	(Chinese Taipei) Lee Yang	(Chinese Taipei) Lin Chia-yu (Chinese Taipei) Wu Hsiao-lin	21–17, 16–21, 18–21	(silver) Runner-up
2019	Polish Open	(Chinese Taipei) Yang Po-hsuan	(England) Ben Lane (England) Sean Vendy	21–19, 21–16	(gold) Winner

BWF International Challenge tournament
BWF International Series tournament
