= Badminton at the 2022 Asian Games – Men's doubles =

Men's doubles at the 2022 Asian Games
- Venue: Binjiang Gymnasium
- Dates: 2–7 October 2023

Medalists
gold medal	Satwiksairaj Rankireddy; Chirag Shetty	India
silver medal	Choi Sol-gyu; Kim Won-ho	South Korea
bronze medal	Lee Yang; Wang Chi-lin	Chinese Taipei
bronze medal	Aaron Chia; Soh Wooi Yik	Malaysia

The badminton men's doubles tournament at the 2022 Asian Games in Hangzhou took place from 2 to 7 October 2023 at Binjiang Gymnasium.

== Schedule ==
All times are China Standard Time (UTC+08:00)

Date	Time	Event
Monday, 2 October 2023	10:00	Round of 32
Wednesday, 3 October 2023	10:00	Round of 16
Thursday, 5 October 2023	9:00	Quarterfinals
Friday, 6 October 2023	9:00	Semifinals
Saturday, 7 October 2023	15:20	Gold medal match

== Results ==
=== Seeds ===
1. Fajar Alfian / Muhammad Rian Ardianto (INA) (quarter-finals)
2. Satwiksairaj Rankireddy / Chirag Shetty (IND) (champions)
3. Liang Weikeng / Wang Chang (CHN) (second round)
4. Kang Min-hyuk / Seo Seung-jae (KOR) (second round)

=== Finals ===
Semi-finals
Lee Yang (TPE); Wang Chi-lin (TPE)	12	10
Choi Sol-gyu (KOR); Kim Won-ho (KOR)	21	21
Aaron Chia (MAS); Soh Wooi Yik (MAS)	17	12
2	Satwiksairaj Rankireddy (IND); Chirag Shetty (IND)	21	21

Final
Choi Sol-gyu (KOR); Kim Won-ho (KOR)	18	16
2	Satwiksairaj Rankireddy (IND); Chirag Shetty (IND)	21	21

=== Top half ===
==== Section 1 ====
First round
P Sukphun (THA); P Teeraratsakul (THA)	21	21
P Dahal (NEP); S Joshi (NEP)	8	5
Arjun M. R. (IND); D Kapila (IND)	3^{r}
T Hoki (JPN); Y Kobayashi (JPN)	13
Lee Y (TPE); Wang C-l (TPE)	21	21
Ong Y S (MAS); Teo E Y (MAS)	16	19

Second round
1	F Alfian (INA); M R Ardianto (INA)	21	21
P Sukphun (THA); P Teeraratsakul (THA)	15	15
T Hoki (JPN); Y Kobayashi (JPN)
Lee Y (TPE); Wang C-l (TPE)	w	/	o

Quarter-finals
1	F Alfian (INA); M R Ardianto (INA)	19	18
Lee Y (TPE); Wang C-l (TPE)	21	21

==== Section 2 ====
First round
3	Liang WK (CHN); Wang C (CHN)	21	21
M de Jesus (TLS); R Sing (TLS)	9	10
Choi S-g (KOR); Kim W-h (KOR)	21	21
A Kwek (SGP); Loh K H (SGP)	14	16
O Enkhbat (MGL); E Enkhbold (MGL)	18	14
M Ali (PAK); M I S Bhatti (PAK)	21	21
T A Mohamed (MDV); H Z Shaheed (MDV)	6	9
Law C H (HKG); Yeung S C (HKG)	21	21

Second round
3	Liang WK (CHN); Wang C (CHN)	10	21	21
Choi S-g (KOR); Kim W-h (KOR)	21	18	23
M Ali (PAK); M I S Bhatti (PAK)	14	11
Law C H (HKG); Yeung S C (HKG)	21	21

Quarter-finals
Choi S-g (KOR); Kim W-h (KOR)	21	21
Law C H (HKG); Yeung S C (HKG)	7	11

=== Bottom half ===
==== Section 3 ====
First round
Lu C-y (TPE); Yang P-h (TPE)	23	12	21
A Chia (MAS); Soh W Y (MAS)	21	21	23
A Gurung (BHU); J S Lhendup (BHU)	4	4
S Jomkoh (THA); K Kedren (THA)	21	21
K Byambajav (MGL); G Jargalsaikhan (MGL)	9	7
Liu YC (CHN); Ou XY (CHN)	21	21
A Koga (JPN); T Saito (JPN)	18	11
4	Kang M-h (KOR); Seo S-j (KOR)	21	21

Second round
A Chia (MAS); Soh W Y (MAS)	21	21
S Jomkoh (THA); K Kedren (THA)	12	14
Liu YC (CHN); Ou XY (CHN)	21	18	21
4	Kang M-h (KOR); Seo S-j (KOR)	19	21	13

Quarter-finals
A Chia (MAS); Soh W Y (MAS)	21	19	21
Liu YC (CHN); Ou XY (CHN)	18	21	18

==== Section 4 ====
First round
J Acharya (NEP); B Katwal (NEP)	21	21
A Nibal (MDV); M A Rasheed (MDV)	17	18
Nge J J (SGP); J Prajogo (SGP)	21	21
S Rikreay (CAM); V Vath (CAM)	11	11
Leong I C (MAC); Vong K W (MAC)	9	8
L R Carnando (INA); D Marthin (INA)	21	21
Chow H L (HKG); Lui C W (HKG)	11	16
2	S Rankireddy (IND); C Shetty (IND)	21	21

Second round
J Acharya (NEP); B Katwal (NEP)	11	4
Nge J J (SGP); J Prajogo (SGP)	21	21
L R Carnando (INA); D Marthin (INA)	22	21	12
2	S Rankireddy (IND); C Shetty (IND)	24	16	21

Quarter-finals
Nge J J (SGP); J Prajogo (SGP)	7	9
2	S Rankireddy (IND); C Shetty (IND)	21	21
