= 2026 Hong Kong Open (badminton) =

2026 badminton tournament

Tournament details
- Dates: 17–22 November
- Edition: 36th
- Level: Super 500
- Total prize money: US$500,000
- Venue: Kai Tak Arena
- Location: Kowloon, Hong Kong

Champions
- Men's singles: (Denmark) Anders Antonsen
- Women's singles: (China) Wang Zhiyi
- Men's doubles: (Malaysia) Man Wei Chong (Malaysia) Tee Kai Wun
- Women's doubles: (Malaysia) Pearly Tan (Malaysia) Thinaah Muralitharan
- Mixed doubles: (China) Feng Yanzhe (China) Huang Dongping

The 2026 Hong Kong Open (officially known as the Li-Ning Hong Kong Open 2026 for sponsorship reasons) was a badminton tournament which took place at the Kai Tak Arena in Hong Kong from 17 to 22 November 2026 and had a total prize of $500,000.

== Tournament ==
The 2026 Hong Kong Open was the thirty-third tournament of the 2026 BWF World Tour and also part of the Hong Kong Open championships, which had been held since 1982. This tournament was organized by Hong Kong Badminton Association and sanctioned by the BWF.

=== Venue ===
This tournament was held at the Kai Tak Arena in Kowloon, Hong Kong.

=== Point distribution ===
Below is the point distribution table for each phase of the tournament based on the BWF points system for the BWF World Tour Super 500 event.

Winner	Runner-up	3/4	5/8	9/16	17/32	33/64	65/128
9,200	7,800	6,420	5,040	3,600	2,220	880	430

=== Prize pool ===
The total prize money was US$500,000 with the distribution of the prize money in accordance with BWF regulations.

Event	Winner	Finalist	Semi-finals	Quarter-finals	Last 16
Singles	$37,500	$19,000	$7,250	$3,000	$1,750
Doubles	$39,500	$19,000	$7,000	$3,625	$1,875

== Men's singles ==
=== Seeds ===
1. (France) Christo Popov (withdrew)
2. (Thailand) Kunlavut Vitidsarn (final)
3. (Denmark) Anders Antonsen (champion)
4. (Canada) Victor Lai (withdrew)
5. (Chinese Taipei) Chou Tien-chen (first round)
6. (Japan) Kodai Naraoka (withdrew)
7. (Indonesia) Alwi Farhan (withdrew)
8. (Singapore) Loh Kean Yew (quarter-finals)

=== Finals ===
semi finals
3	(Denmark) Anders Antonsen	21	21
SWM	(India) Lakshya Sen	13	13
(Indonesia) Zaki Ubaidillah	21	15	16
2	(Thailand) Kunlavut Vitidsarn	18	21	21

Final
3	(Denmark) Anders Antonsen	w	/	o
2	(Thailand) Kunlavut Vitidsarn

=== Top half ===
==== Section 1 ====
First round
3	(Denmark) A Antonsen	21	21
Q1	(Malaysia) Cheam J W	15	14
(Thailand) Pan Teeraratsakul	13	15
(Hong Kong) J Gunawan	21	21
SWM	(Chinese Taipei) Lin C-y	15	21	21
(Canada) B Yang	21	16	14
Q4	(China) Zhu XC	21	21
PFQ	(Chinese Taipei) Su L-y	7	14

Second round
3	(Denmark) A Antonsen	21	21
(Hong Kong) J Gunawan	19	15
SWM	(Chinese Taipei) Lin C-y	21	11	17
Q4	(China) Zhu XC	16	21	21

Quarter-finals
3	(Denmark) A Antonsen	21	14	24
Q4	(China) Zhu XC	18	21	22

==== Section 2 ====
First round
8	(Singapore) Loh K Y	21	21	21
(Chinese Taipei) Chi Y-j	23	12	18
PFQ	(Chinese Taipei) Lee C-h	22	17
(Japan) K Nishimoto	24	21
SWM	(India) L Sen	14	21	25
(France) A Merklé	21	16	23
(Denmark) R Gemke	19	21	21
(Japan) Y Okimoto	21	19	18

Second round
8	(Singapore) Loh K Y	12	21	21
(Japan) K Nishimoto	21	9	14
SWM	(India) L Sen	21	21
(Denmark) R Gemke	11	18

Quarter-finals
8	(Singapore) Loh K Y	17	21	13
SWM	(India) L Sen	21	10	21

=== Bottom half ===
==== Section 3 ====
First round
(Malaysia) Leong J H	12	13
PFQ	(China) Dong TY	21	21
(Republic of Ireland) N Nguyen	17	17
SWM	(France) T J Popov	21	21
(Hong Kong) Ng K L	21	21
(Singapore) J Teh	19	15
(Indonesia) Z Ubaidillah	21	7	21
5	(Chinese Taipei) Chou T-c	19	21	19

Second round
PFQ	(China) Dong TY	9	20
SWM	(France) T J Popov	21	22
(Hong Kong) Ng K L	10	4^{r}
(Indonesia) Z Ubaidillah	21	13

Quarter-finals
SWM	(France) T J Popov	8	9
(Indonesia) Z Ubaidillah	21	21

==== Section 4 ====
First round
Q2	(Denmark) M Johannesen	18	15
(South Korea) Yoo T-b	21	21
(India) S Kidambi	21	16	21
SWM	(Japan) K Watanabe	16	21	9
PFQ	(China) Hu ZA	16	18
(Hong Kong) Lee C Y	21	21
Q3	(Japan) S Ogawa	7	21
2	(Thailand) K Vitidsarn	21	23

Second round
(South Korea) Yoo T-b	21	18	14
(India) S Kidambi	12	21	21
(Hong Kong) Lee C Y	14	14
2	(Thailand) K Vitidsarn	21	21

Quarter-finals
(India) S Kidambi	17	7
2	(Thailand) K Vitidsarn	21	21

== Women's singles ==
=== Seeds ===
1. (China) Wang Zhiyi (champion)
2. (China) Chen Yufei (second round)
3. (Thailand) Ratchanok Intanon (semi-finals)
4. (Japan) Tomoka Miyazaki (semi-finals)
5. (Thailand) Pornpawee Chochuwong (final)
6. (Indonesia) Putri Kusuma Wardani (quarter-finals)
7. (Japan) Nozomi Okuhara (withdrew)
8. (China) Han Yue (second round)

=== Finals ===
Semi-finals
1	(China) Wang Zhiyi	21	21
4	(Japan) Tomoka Miyazaki	15	15
3	(Thailand) Ratchanok Intanon	16	21	13
5	(Thailand) Pornpawee Chochuwong	21	18	21

Final
1	(China) Wang Zhiyi	21	21
5	(Thailand) Pornpawee Chochuwong	16	11

=== Top half ===
==== Section 1 ====
First round
1	(China) Wang ZY	21	21
PFQ	(Chinese Taipei) Pai Y-p	7	9
(Canada) R Chan	10	18
(Japan) N Nidaira	21	21
6	(Indonesia) P K Wardani	21	21
(Malaysia) Letshanaa K	15	12
(Chinese Taipei) Huang Y-h	16	17
Q2	(Thailand) T Saeheng	21	21

Second round
1	(China) Wang ZY	21	21
(Japan) N Nidaira	13	15
6	(Indonesia) P K Wardani	21	21
Q2	(Thailand) T Saeheng	15	9

Quarter-finals
1	(China) Wang ZY	22	22
6	(Indonesia) P K Wardani	20	20

==== Section 2 ====
First round
4	(Japan) T Miyazaki	21	21
(India) A Kharb	10	18
(Chinese Taipei) Chiu P-c	21	21
Q4	(Hong Kong) Lo S Y	15	11
SWM	(Japan) H Akechi	21	9	21
Q1	(China) Xu WJ	14	21	17
(India) A Chaliha	12	21	21
(India) I Baruah	21	13	12

Second round
4	(Japan) T Miyazaki	21	21
(Chinese Taipei) Chiu P-c	17	15
SWM	(Japan) H Akechi	21	21
(India) A Chaliha	17	12

Quarter-finals
4	(Japan) T Miyazaki	21	21
SWM	(Japan) H Akechi	11	9

=== Bottom half ===
==== Section 3 ====
First round
(Canada) M Li	19	21	21
(Chinese Taipei) Tung C-t	21	14	16
(India) U Hooda	21	19	17
8	(China) Han Y	17	21	21
(United States) I Jaiswal	21	17	15
(Malaysia) Wong L C	16	21	21
Q3	(Chinese Taipei) Peng Y-w	17	12
3	(Thailand) R Intanon	21	21

Second round
(Canada) M Li	21	11
8	(China) Han Y	14	5^{r}
(Malaysia) Wong L C	22	14	15
3	(Thailand) R Intanon	20	21	21

Quarter-finals
(Canada) M Li	19	16
3	(Thailand) R Intanon	21	21

==== Section 4 ====
First round
PFQ	(Chinese Taipei) Huang C-p	16	19
(Chinese Taipei) Lin H-t	21	21
(Denmark) L Kjærsfeldt	11	11
5	(Thailand) P Chochuwong	21	21
(India) R Ramraj	21	21
(Denmark) M Blichfeldt	18	18
(Denmark) A Schulz	12	14
2	(China) Chen YF	21	21

Second round
(Chinese Taipei) Lin H-t	11	12
5	(Thailand) P Chochuwong	21	21
(India) R Ramraj	21	24
2	(China) Chen YF	18	22

Quarter-finals
5	(Thailand) P Chochuwong	21	21
(India) R Ramraj	19	16

== Men's doubles ==
=== Seeds ===
1. (Indonesia) Fajar Alfian / Muhammad Shohibul Fikri (second round)
2. (China) Liang Weikeng / Wang Chang (quarter-finals)
3. (Malaysia) Aaron Chia / Soh Wooi Yik (withdrew)
4. (Malaysia) Goh Sze Fei / Nur Izzuddin (withdrew)
5. (India) Satwiksairaj Rankireddy / Chirag Shetty (semi-finals)
6. (Indonesia) Sabar Karyaman Gutama / Muhammad Reza Pahlevi Isfahani (first round)
7. (England) Ben Lane / Sean Vendy (second round)
8. (Malaysia) Man Wei Chong / Tee Kai Wun (champions)

=== Finals ===
Semi-finals
8	(Malaysia) Man Wei Chong (Malaysia) Tee Kai Wun	21	21
5	(India) Satwiksairaj Rankireddy (India) Chirag Shetty	18	19
(Indonesia) Leo Rolly Carnando (Indonesia) Daniel Marthin	21	21
PFQ	(South Korea) Kang Min-hyuk (South Korea) Lee Jong-min	18	11

Final
8	(Malaysia) Man Wei Chong (Malaysia) Tee Kai Wun	21	21
(Indonesia) Leo Rolly Carnando (Indonesia) Daniel Marthin	19	18

=== Top half ===
==== Section 1 ====
First round
1	(Indonesia) F Alfian (Indonesia) M S Fikri	21	21	21
PFQ	(Chinese Taipei) Chen Z-r (Chinese Taipei) Lin Y-c	15	23	19
(Denmark) D Lundgaard (Denmark) M Vestergaard	21	21
Q1	(South Korea) Choi S-g (Malaysia) Goh V S	17	19
8	(Malaysia) Man W C (Malaysia) Tee K W	21	21
Q4	(Thailand) P Sukphun (Thailand) Pak Teeraratsakul	10	14
Q2	(Chinese Taipei) He Z-w (Chinese Taipei) Huang J-h	22	21
(India) H Amsakarunan (India) Arjun M. R.	20	12

Second round
1	(Indonesia) F Alfian (Indonesia) M S Fikri	13	21	17
(Denmark) D Lundgaard (Denmark) M Vestergaard	21	16	21
8	(Malaysia) Man W C (Malaysia) Tee K W	21	21
Q2	(Chinese Taipei) He Z-w (Chinese Taipei) Huang J-h	16	16

Quarter-finals
(Denmark) D Lundgaard (Denmark) M Vestergaard	16	16
8	(Malaysia) Man W C (Malaysia) Tee K W	21	21

==== Section 2 ====
First round
5	(India) S Rankireddy (India) C Shetty	15	21	28
(Chinese Taipei) Lee J-h (Chinese Taipei) Yang P-h	21	17	26
(Malaysia) N M Azriyn A (Malaysia) Tan W K	21	17	21
Q3	(Japan) H Kawabe (Japan) K Matsukawa	16	21	19
SWM	(Indonesia) R Indra (Indonesia) N Joaquin	21	18	16
(China) Hu KY (China) Lin XY	17	21	21
(Chinese Taipei) Lee F-c (Chinese Taipei) Lee F-j	19	17
(Japan) K Kumagai (Japan) H Nishi	21	21

Second round
5	(India) S Rankireddy (India) C Shetty	21	21
(Malaysia) N M Azriyn A (Malaysia) Tan W K	19	16
(China) Hu KY (China) Lin XY	21	21
(Japan) K Kumagai (Japan) H Nishi	19	17

Quarter-finals
5	(India) S Rankireddy (India) C Shetty	21	13	21
(China) Hu KY (China) Lin XY	12	21	16

=== Bottom half ===
==== Section 3 ====
First round
(China) He JT (China) Ren XY	17	21	21
(Indonesia) A F Rayhan (Indonesia) D A Wahyudi	21	17	19
PFQ	(Denmark) C F Kjær (Denmark) R Kjær	17	12
SWM	(China) Chen BY (China) Liu Y	21	21
(Chinese Taipei) Chiu H-c (Chinese Taipei) Wang C-l	17	14
(Malaysia) A Tai (Malaysia) Yap R K	21	21
(Indonesia) L R Carnando (Indonesia) D Marthin	21	21
6	(Indonesia) S K Gutama (Indonesia) M R P Isfahani	13	15

Second round
(China) He JT (China) Ren XY	21	21
SWM	(China) Chen BY (China) Liu Y	15	11
(Malaysia) A Tai (Malaysia) Yap R K	11	21	19
(Indonesia) L R Carnando (Indonesia) D Marthin	21	18	21

Quarter-finals
(China) He JT (China) Ren XY	21	17	17
(Indonesia) L R Carnando (Indonesia) D Marthin	17	21	21

==== Section 4 ====
First round
PFQ	(South Korea) Kang M-h (South Korea) Lee J-m	21	21	21
(Denmark) K Astrup (Denmark) A S Rasmussen	11	23	16
(United States) Chen Z-y (United States) P Smith	12	16
7	(England) B Lane (England) S Vendy	21	21
(South Korea) Jin Y (South Korea) Jo S-h	16	21	12
PFQ	(Malaysia) Chia W J (Malaysia) Teo E Y	21	18	21
(Japan) H Okamura (Japan) K Yamashita	21	16	18
2	(China) Liang WK (China) Wang C	14	21	21

Second round
PFQ	(South Korea) Kang M-h (South Korea) Lee J-m	w	/	o
7	(England) B Lane (England) S Vendy
PFQ	(Malaysia) Chia W J (Malaysia) Teo E Y	21	18	19
2	(China) Liang WK (China) Wang C	19	21	21

Quarter-finals
PFQ	(South Korea) Kang M-h (South Korea) Lee J-m	21	19	21
2	(China) Liang WK (China) Wang C	19	21	18

== Women's doubles ==
=== Seeds ===
1. (Japan) Yuki Fukushima / Mayu Matsumoto (quarter-finals)
2. (Malaysia) Pearly Tan / Thinaah Muralitharan (champions)
3. (Japan) Rin Iwanaga / Kie Nakanishi (quarter-finals)
4. (Chinese Taipei) Hsu Yin-hui / Lin Jhih-yun (second round)
5. (Indonesia) Amallia Cahaya Pratiwi / Siti Fadia Silva Ramadhanti (semi-finals)
6. (Bulgaria) Gabriela Stoeva / Stefani Stoeva (second round)
7. (Indonesia) Febriana Dwipuji Kusuma / Meilysa Trias Puspita Sari (first round)
8. (Japan) Rui Hirokami / Sayaka Hobara (second round)

=== Finals ===
Semi-finals
5	(Indonesia) Amallia Cahaya Pratiwi (Indonesia) Siti Fadia Silva Ramadhanti	16	21
(Japan) Sumire Nakade (Japan) Miyu Takahashi	21	23
(Malaysia) Low Zi Yu (Malaysia) Noraqilah Maisarah	13	19
2	(Malaysia) Pearly Tan (Malaysia) Thinaah Muralitharan	21	21

Final
(Japan) Sumire Nakade (Japan) Miyu Takahashi	20	16
2	(Malaysia) Pearly Tan (Malaysia) Thinaah Muralitharan	22	21

=== Top half ===
==== Section 1 ====
First round
1	(Japan) Y Fukushima (Japan) M Matsumoto	21	17	21
(China) Jia YF (China) Zhang C	13	21	12
(Japan) S Hirota (Japan) A Sakuramoto	14	21	21
(China) Li YJ (China) Wang YD	21	7	5
5	(Indonesia) A C Pratiwi (Indonesia) S F S Ramadhanti	21	21
(Chinese Taipei) Chou Y-a (Chinese Taipei) Hsieh P-s	6	7
(Japan) R Hiramoto (Japan) C Shida	17	21	18
(Thailand) H Mijad (Thailand) N Tungkasatan	21	11	21

Second round
1	(Japan) Y Fukushima (Japan) M Matsumoto	21	21
(Japan) S Hirota (Japan) A Sakuramoto	14	15
5	(Indonesia) A C Pratiwi (Indonesia) S F S Ramadhanti	21	21
(Thailand) H Mijad (Thailand) N Tungkasatan	12	7

Quarter-finals
1	(Japan) Y Fukushima (Japan) M Matsumoto	16	15
5	(Indonesia) A C Pratiwi (Indonesia) S F S Ramadhanti	21	21

==== Section 2 ====
First round
3	(Japan) R Iwanaga (Japan) K Nakanishi	21	21
Q4	(England) A Harris (England) E van Leeuwen	17	12
(Chinese Taipei) Chang C-h (Chinese Taipei) Yang C-t	21	15	21
Q3	(South Korea) Kim H-j (South Korea) Lee Y-w	13	21	14
6	(Bulgaria) G Stoeva (Bulgaria) S Stoeva	21	21
(Japan) N Hara (Japan) R Kiyose	9	19
(Japan) S Nakade (Japan) M Takahashi	21	21
(Chinese Taipei) Hsu Y-c (Chinese Taipei) Sung Y-h	17	11

Second round
3	(Japan) R Iwanaga (Japan) K Nakanishi	21	21
(Chinese Taipei) Chang C-h (Chinese Taipei) Yang C-t	15	16
6	(Bulgaria) G Stoeva (Bulgaria) S Stoeva	21	18	18
(Japan) S Nakade (Japan) M Takahashi	15	21	21

Quarter-finals
3	(Japan) R Iwanaga (Japan) K Nakanishi	19	22
(Japan) S Nakade (Japan) M Takahashi	21	24

=== Bottom half ===
==== Section 3 ====
First round
(Canada) J Dent (Canada) C Lai	16	20
(United States) F Corbett (United States) J Gai	21	22
(Chinese Taipei) Chen Y-f (Chinese Taipei) Sun L-c	12	11
8	(Japan) R Hirokami (Japan) S Hobara	21	21
(Malaysia) Low Z Y (Malaysia) N Maisarah	21	21
Q1	(Thailand) O Jongsathapornparn (Thailand) S S Wedler	18	16
(Chinese Taipei) Lin C-c (Chinese Taipei) Yang C-y	23	17	14
4	(Chinese Taipei) Hsu Y-h (Chinese Taipei) Lin J-y	21	21	21

Second round
(United States) F Corbett (United States) J Gai	21	18	21
8	(Japan) R Hirokami (Japan) S Hobara	15	21	16
(Malaysia) Low Z Y (Malaysia) N Maisarah	21	21
4	(Chinese Taipei) Hsu Y-h (Chinese Taipei) Lin J-y	19	18

Quarter-finals
(United States) F Corbett (United States) J Gai	19	21	16
(Malaysia) Low Z Y (Malaysia) N Maisarah	21	16	21

==== Section 4 ====
First round
(India) T Jolly (India) G Gopichand	21	21
Q2	(Hong Kong) Fan K Y (Hong Kong) Leung Y Y	16	9
(United States) L Lam (United States) A Lee	21	13	21
7	(Indonesia) F D Kusuma (Indonesia) M T Puspita Sari	16	21	15
(Hong Kong) Lui L L (Hong Kong) Tsang H Y	12	21	17
(Hong Kong) Yeung N T (Hong Kong) Yeung P L	21	11	21
(China) Chen FST (China) Luo XM	13	16
2	(Malaysia) P Tan (Malaysia) Thinaah M	21	21

Second round
(India) T Jolly (India) G Gopichand	20	13
(United States) L Lam (United States) A Lee	22	21
(Hong Kong) Yeung N T (Hong Kong) Yeung P L	9	10
2	(Malaysia) P Tan (Malaysia) Thinaah M	21	21

Quarter-finals
(United States) L Lam (United States) A Lee	18	11
2	(Malaysia) P Tan (Malaysia) Thinaah M	21	21

== Mixed doubles ==
=== Seeds ===
1. (China) Feng Yanzhe / Huang Dongping (champions)
2. (China) Jiang Zhenbang / Wei Yaxin (final)
3. (Thailand) Dechapol Puavaranukroh / Supissara Paewsampran (first round)
4. (China) Guo Xinwa / Chen Fanghui (quarter-finals)
5. (Chinese Taipei) Ye Hong-wei / Nicole Gonzales Chan (withdrew)
6. (China) Cheng Xing / Zhang Chi (first round)
7. (Indonesia) Amri Syahnawi / Nita Violina Marwah (second round)
8. (Chinese Taipei) Yang Po-hsuan / Hu Ling-fang (first round)

=== Finals ===
Semi-finals
1	(China) Feng Yanzhe (China) Huang Dongping	21	21
SWM	(Malaysia) Goh Soon Huat (Malaysia) Shevon Jemie Lai	17	18
(Indonesia) Dejan Ferdinansyah (Indonesia) Felisha Pasaribu	13	13
2	(China) Jiang Zhenbang (China) Wei Yaxin	21	21

Final
1	(China) Feng Yanzhe (China) Huang Dongping	17	21	21
2	(China) Jiang Zhenbang (China) Wei Yaxin	21	9	15

=== Top half ===
==== Section 1 ====
First round
1	(China) Feng YZ (China) Huang DP	21	21
(Chinese Taipei) Liu K-h (Chinese Taipei) Hsu Y-h	10	10
(Malaysia) Wong T C (Malaysia) Lim C S	28	21
(India) H Amsakarunan (India) T Crasto	26	14
7	(Indonesia) A Syahnawi (Indonesia) N V Marwah	23	21
Q2	(Hong Kong) J Yu (Hong Kong) Tse Y S	21	17
Q1	(Chinese Taipei) Wu H-y (Chinese Taipei) Yang C-y	24	21
(Malaysia) J Wong (Malaysia) Cheng S Y	22	14

Second round
1	(China) Feng YZ (China) Huang DP	21	21
(Malaysia) Wong T C (Malaysia) Lim C S	8	17
7	(Indonesia) A Syahnawi (Indonesia) N V Marwah	16	21	17
Q1	(Chinese Taipei) Wu H-y (Chinese Taipei) Yang C-y	21	15	21

Quarter-finals
1	(China) Feng YZ (China) Huang DP	21	21
Q1	(Chinese Taipei) Wu H-y (Chinese Taipei) Yang C-y	9	10

==== Section 2 ====
First round
4	(China) Guo XW (China) Chen FH	21	21
Q3	(India) D Kapila (India) R Sharma	15	10
(Japan) Y Watanabe (Japan) M Taguchi	24	21
(Japan) A Koga (Japan) N Saito	22	16
SWM	(Malaysia) Goh S H (Malaysia) S J Lai	21	21
(United States) Chen Z-y (United States) F Corbett	17	14
(Japan) H Kawabe (Japan) K Ishikawa	13	21	22
(United States) P Smith (United States) J Gai	21	18	24

Second round
4	(China) Guo XW (China) Chen FH	21	21
(Japan) Y Watanabe (Japan) M Taguchi	14	8
SWM	(Malaysia) Goh S H (Malaysia) S J Lai	22	21
(United States) P Smith (United States) J Gai	20	19

Quarter-finals
4	(China) Guo XW (China) Chen FH	15	15
SWM	(Malaysia) Goh S H (Malaysia) S J Lai	21	21

=== Bottom half ===
==== Section 3 ====
First round
(Malaysia) Chen T J (Malaysia) Chan W T	14	16
PFQ	(Thailand) S Jomkoh (Thailand) J Sudjaipraparat	21	21
(Spain) R García (Spain) L Rodríguez	21	15	21
6	(China) Cheng X (China) Zhang C	18	21	18
(England) C Hemming (England) E van Leeuwen	15	19
(Hong Kong) Chan Y C (Hong Kong) Ng T Y	21	21
(Indonesia) D Ferdinansyah (Indonesia) F Pasaribu	21	21
3	(Thailand) D Puavaranukroh (Thailand) S Paewsampran	18	13

Second round
PFQ	(Thailand) S Jomkoh (Thailand) J Sudjaipraparat	21	13	15
(Spain) R García (Spain) L Rodríguez	15	21	21
(Hong Kong) Chan Y C (Hong Kong) Ng T Y	22	21	11
(Indonesia) D Ferdinansyah (Indonesia) F Pasaribu	24	19	21

Quarter-finals
(Spain) R García (Spain) L Rodríguez	13	17
(Indonesia) D Ferdinansyah (Indonesia) F Pasaribu	21	21

==== Section 4 ====
First round
(Thailand) Pak Teeraratsakul (Thailand) S Taerattanachai	21	21
Q4	(Canada) J Lai (Canada) C Lai	13	12
(China) Gao JX (China) Wu MY	21	21
8	(Chinese Taipei) Yang P-h (Chinese Taipei) Hu L-f	16	9
(Indonesia) M Faza (Indonesia) A Pranata	14	24	13
(Malaysia) Hoo P R (Malaysia) Lai P J	21	22	21
(India) D Rawat (India) K. Maneesha	9	15
2	(China) Jiang ZB (China) Wei YX	21	21

Second round
(Thailand) Pak Teeraratsakul (Thailand) S Taerattanachai	18	17
(China) Gao JX (China) Wu MY	21	21
(Malaysia) Hoo P R (Malaysia) Lai P J	21	8	13
2	(China) Jiang ZB (China) Wei YX	14	21	21

Quarter-finals
(China) Gao JX (China) Wu MY
2	(China) Jiang ZB (China) Wei YX	w	/	o

Preceded by 2026 Japan Masters; 2026 Kaohsiung Masters	BWF World Tour; 2026 BWF season	Succeeded by 2026 Syed Modi International
