= Badminton at the 2026 Asian Games =

- Venue: Ichinomiya City Municipal Gymnasium
- Location: Ichinomiya, Aichi Prefecture, Japan
- Dates: 20 – 29 September 2026
- Competitors: 248 from 24 nations

Badminton at the 2026 Asian Games was between 20 and 29 September at Ichinomiya City Municipal Gymnasium. This was the sport's seventeenth consecutive appearance as an official sport at the Games, since the 1962 edition.

== Schedule ==
The schedule is as follows:

P	Preliminary rounds	¼	Quarterfinals	½	Semifinals	F	Final

Event↓/Date →	20 Sun	21 Mon	22 Tue	23 Wed	24 Thu	25 Fri	26 Sat	27 Sun	28 Mon	29 Tue
Men's singles						P	P	¼	½	F
Men's doubles						P	¼		½	F
Men's team		P	¼	½	F					
Women's singles						P	¼		½	F
Women's doubles						P	P	¼	½	F
Women's team	P		¼	½	F					
Mixed doubles						P	¼		½	F

== Medal summary ==
=== Medal table ===
* Host nation (Japan)

Rank	Nation	Gold	Silver	Bronze	Total
1	China	2	3	3	8
2	Indonesia	2	1	3	6
3	South Korea	2	0	3	5
4	Thailand	1	0	1	2
5	Japan*	0	2	1	3
6	Singapore	0	1	0	1
7	Chinese Taipei	0	0	1	1
7	India	0	0	1	1
7	Malaysia	0	0	1	1
Totals (9 entries)		7	7	14	28

=== Medalists ===
Event	Gold	Silver	Bronze
Men's singles	Kunlavut Vitidsarn; Thailand	Loh Kean Yew; Singapore	Yoo Tae-bin; South Korea
Men's singles	Kunlavut Vitidsarn; Thailand	Loh Kean Yew; Singapore	Alwi Farhan; Indonesia
Women's singles	An Se-young; South Korea	Akane Yamaguchi; Japan	Chen Yufei; China
Women's singles	An Se-young; South Korea	Akane Yamaguchi; Japan	Wang Zhiyi; China
Men's doubles	Indonesia; Leo Rolly Carnando; Daniel Marthin	China; Liang Weikeng; Wang Chang	South Korea; Kim Won-ho; Seo Seung-jae
Men's doubles	Indonesia; Leo Rolly Carnando; Daniel Marthin	China; Liang Weikeng; Wang Chang	Indonesia; Fajar Alfian; Muhammad Shohibul Fikri
Women's doubles	South Korea; Baek Ha-na; Lee So-hee	China; Liu Shengshu; Tan Ning	Malaysia; Pearly Tan; Thinaah Muralitharan
Women's doubles	South Korea; Baek Ha-na; Lee So-hee	China; Liu Shengshu; Tan Ning	Japan; Rin Uesaka; Kie Nakanishi
Mixed doubles	China; Jiang Zhenbang; Wei Yaxin	Indonesia; Amri Syahnawi; Nita Violina Marwah	China; Feng Yanzhe; Huang Dongping
Mixed doubles	China; Jiang Zhenbang; Wei Yaxin	Indonesia; Amri Syahnawi; Nita Violina Marwah	Chinese Taipei; Ye Hong-wei; Nicole Gonzales Chan
Men's team	Indonesia; Fajar Alfian; Jonatan Christie; Alwi Farhan; Muhammad Shohibul Fikri; Nikolaus Joaquin; Daniel Marthin; Leo Rolly Carnando; Amri Syahnawi; Zaki Ubaidillah; Muhamad Yusuf	China; Feng Yanzhe; He Jiting; Jiang Zhenbang; Li Shifeng; Liang Weikeng; Liu Yi; Lu Guangzu; Shi Yuqi; Wang Chang; Weng Hongyang	Thailand; Puritat Arree; Chaloempon Charoenkitamorn; Ruttanapak Oupthong; Dechapol Puavaranukroh; Peeratchai Sukphun; Pakkapon Teeraratsakul; Panitchaphon Teeraratsakul; Worrapol Thongsa-nga; Kunlavut Vitidsarn; Tanawat Yimjit
Men's team	Indonesia; Fajar Alfian; Jonatan Christie; Alwi Farhan; Muhammad Shohibul Fikri; Nikolaus Joaquin; Daniel Marthin; Leo Rolly Carnando; Amri Syahnawi; Zaki Ubaidillah; Muhamad Yusuf	China; Feng Yanzhe; He Jiting; Jiang Zhenbang; Li Shifeng; Liang Weikeng; Liu Yi; Lu Guangzu; Shi Yuqi; Wang Chang; Weng Hongyang	India; Hariharan Amsakarunan; Prannoy H. S. Dhruv Kapila; Srikanth Kidambi; Arjun M. R. Tharun Mannepalli; Satwiksairaj Rankireddy; Lakshya Sen; Ayush Shetty; Chirag Shetty
Women's team	China; Chen Yufei; Han Qianxi; Han Yue; Huang Dongping; Jia Yifan; Liu Shengshu; Tan Ning; Wang Zhiyi; Wei Yaxin; Zhang Shuxian	Japan; Yuki Fukushima; Riko Gunji; Sayaka Hobara; Mayu Matsumoto; Tomoka Miyazaki; Kie Nakanishi; Nozomi Okuhara; Maya Taguchi; Rin Uesaka; Akane Yamaguchi	Indonesia; Ni Kadek Dhinda Amartya Pratiwi; Siti Fadia Silva Ramadhanti; Febi Setianingrum; Nita Violina Marwah; Febriana Dwipuji Kusuma; Meilysa Trias Puspita Sari; Mutiara Ayu Puspitasari; Putri Kusuma Wardani; Rachel Allessya Rose; Thalita Ramadhani Wiryawan
Women's team	China; Chen Yufei; Han Qianxi; Han Yue; Huang Dongping; Jia Yifan; Liu Shengshu; Tan Ning; Wang Zhiyi; Wei Yaxin; Zhang Shuxian	Japan; Yuki Fukushima; Riko Gunji; Sayaka Hobara; Mayu Matsumoto; Tomoka Miyazaki; Kie Nakanishi; Nozomi Okuhara; Maya Taguchi; Rin Uesaka; Akane Yamaguchi	South Korea; An Se-young; Baek Ha-na; Jang Ha-jeong; Jeong Na-eun; Kim Ga-eun; Kim Ga-ram; Kim Hye-jeong; Lee So-hee; Lee Yeon-woo; Sim Yu-jin

== Participating nations ==
- Bahrain (1)
- Bangladesh (5)
- China (20)
- Chinese Taipei (20)
- Hong Kong (20)
- India (20)
- Iran (2)
- Indonesia (20)
- Japan (20) (host)
- Kazakhstan (9)
- Laos (2)
- Macau (6)
- Malaysia (20)
- Maldives (4)
- Mongolia (16)
- Nepal (4)
- North Korea (2)
- Pakistan (2)
- Singapore (4)
- South Korea (20)
- Sri Lanka (3)
- Tajikistan (2)
- Thailand (20)
- Vietnam (6)
