= 2023 Korea Open (badminton) =

Badminton tournament in Korea

Tournament details
- Dates: 18–23 July
- Edition: 30th
- Level: Super 500
- Total prize money: US$420,000
- Venue: Jinnam Stadium
- Location: Yeosu, South Korea

Champions
- Men's singles: (Denmark) Anders Antonsen
- Women's singles: (South Korea) An Se-young
- Men's doubles: (India) Satwiksairaj Rankireddy (India) Chirag Shetty
- Women's doubles: (China) Chen Qingchen (China) Jia Yifan
- Mixed doubles: (China) Feng Yanzhe (China) Huang Dongping

The 2023 Korea Open was a badminton tournament which took place at Jinnam Stadium in Yeosu, South Korea, from 18 to 23 July 2023. The tournament had a total prize pool of $420,000.

== Tournament ==
The 2023 Korea Open was the fifth Super 500 tournament of the 2023 BWF World Tour and was part of the Korea Open championships, which had been held since 1991. This tournament was organized by the Badminton Korea Association with sanction from the BWF.

=== Venue ===
This international tournament was held at Jinnam Stadium in Yeosu, South Korea.

=== Point distribution ===
Below is the point distribution table for each phase of the tournament based on the BWF points system for the BWF World Tour Super 500 event.

Winner	Runner-up	3/4	5/8	9/16	17/32	33/64	65/128
9,200	7,800	6,420	5,040	3,600	2,220	880	430

=== Prize pool ===
The total prize money was US$420,000 with the distribution of the prize money in accordance with BWF regulations.

Event	Winner	Finalist	Semi-finals	Quarter-finals	Last 16
Singles	$31,500	$15,960	$6,090	$2,520	$1,470
Doubles	$33,180	$15,960	$5,880	$3,045	$1,575

== Men's singles ==
=== Seeds ===
1. (Japan) Kodai Naraoka (Semi-finals)
2. (Chinese Taipei) Chou Tien-chen (Second round)
3. (China) Shi Yuqi (Semi-finals)
4. (Singapore) Loh Kean Yew (Final)
5. (India) Prannoy H. S. (Second round)
6. (Japan) Kenta Nishimoto (Quarter-finals)
7. (China) Lu Guangzu (Quarter-finals)
8. (Malaysia) Lee Zii Jia (First round)

=== Finals ===
Semi-finals
1	(Japan) Kodai Naraoka	21	16	15
4	(Singapore) Loh Kean Yew	18	21	21
3	(China) Shi Yuqi	16	22
(Denmark) Anders Antonsen	21	24

Final
4	(Singapore) Loh Kean Yew	21	11	19
(Denmark) Anders Antonsen	11	21	21

=== Top half ===
==== Section 1 ====
First round
1	(Japan) K Naraoka	21	21
(Israel) M Zilberman	10	15
Q3	(South Korea) Choi J-h	15	19
(India) P Rajawat	21	21
5	(India) Prannoy H. S.	21	21
PFQ	(Belgium) J Carraggi	13	17
Q4	(South Korea) Lee Y-g	8	8
(Hong Kong) Lee C Y	21	21

Second round
1	(Japan) K Naraoka	21	18	21
(India) P Rajawat	14	21	17
5	(India) Prannoy H. S.	15	21	18
(Hong Kong) Lee C Y	21	19	21

Quarter-finals
1	(Japan) K Naraoka	21	21
(Hong Kong) Lee C Y	17	18

==== Section 2 ====
First round
4	(Singapore) Loh K Y	21	21
(Malaysia) Leong J H	10	14
(China) Zhao JP	17	21	21
Q2	(South Korea) Son W-h	21	18	17
8	(Malaysia) Lee Z J	15	21	17
(Hong Kong) Ng K L	21	18	21
(India) M Manjunath	11	4
(Malaysia) Ng T Y	21	21

Second round
4	(Singapore) Loh K Y	21	17	21
(China) Zhao JP	19	21	6
(Hong Kong) Ng K L	18	17
(Malaysia) Ng T Y	21	21

Quarter-finals
4	(Singapore) Loh K Y	22	21
(Malaysia) Ng T Y	20	19

=== Bottom half ===
==== Section 3 ====
First round
(India) K George	17	9
(Chinese Taipei) Wang T-w	21	21
(Japan) K Tsuneyama	9	21	16
7	(China) Lu GZ	21	17	21
(Japan) K Momota	12	24	21
(India) S Kidambi	21	22	17
(Canada) B Yang	13	15
3	(China) Shi YQ	21	21

Second round
(Chinese Taipei) Wang T-w	20	18
7	(China) Lu GZ	22	21
(Japan) K Momota	16	16
3	(China) Shi YQ	21	21

Quarter-finals
7	(China) Lu GZ	7	21	18
3	(China) Shi YQ	21	13	21

==== Section 4 ====
First round
(Indonesia) C A Dwi Wardoyo	21	19	11
(Japan) K Watanabe	19	21	21
Q1	(South Korea) Choi P-g	17	14
6	(Japan) K Nishimoto	21	21
PFQ	(South Korea) Jeon H-j	15	19
(Denmark) A Antonsen	21	21
(Malaysia) Cheam J W	13	11
2	(Chinese Taipei) Chou T-c	21	21

Second round
(Japan) K Watanabe	13	14
6	(Japan) K Nishimoto	21	21
(Denmark) A Antonsen	21	21
2	(Chinese Taipei) Chou T-c	13	19

Quarter-finals
6	(Japan) K Nishimoto	11	21	18
(Denmark) A Antonsen	21	10	21

== Women's singles ==
=== Seeds ===
1. (Japan) Akane Yamaguchi (Semi-finals)
2. (South Korea) An Se-young (Champion)
3. (China) Chen Yufei (Semi-finals)
4. (Chinese Taipei) Tai Tzu-ying (Final)
5. (China) He Bingjiao (Second round)
6. (Indonesia) Gregoria Mariska Tunjung (Second round)
7. (China) Han Yue (Second round)
8. (China) Wang Zhiyi (Quarter-finals)

=== Finals ===
Semi-finals
1	(Japan) Akane Yamaguchi	17	19
4	(Chinese Taipei) Tai Tzu-ying	21	21
3	(China) Chen Yufei	21	8	22
2	(South Korea) An Se-young	15	21	24

Final
4	(Chinese Taipei) Tai Tzu-ying	9	15
2	(South Korea) An Se-young	21	21

=== Top half ===
==== Section 1 ====
First round
1	(Japan) A Yamaguchi	21	12	21
(Thailand) P Chochuwong	17	21	19
PFQ	(Malaysia) Kisona S	21	21
(United States) L Lam	19	19
5	(China) He BJ	21	21
(Singapore) Yeo J M	19	19
(South Korea) Kim G-e	21	21
PFQ	(India) T Mir	11	18

Second round
1	(Japan) A Yamaguchi	20	21	21
PFQ	(Malaysia) Kisona S	22	14	14
5	(China) He BJ	9	17
(South Korea) Kim G-e	21	21

Quarter-finals
1	(Japan) A Yamaguchi	21	19	21
(South Korea) Kim G-e	17	21	12

==== Section 2 ====
First round
4	(Chinese Taipei) Tai T-y	21	21
(India) M Bansod	17	7
Q3	(Malaysia) Letshanaa K	21	15	21
Q4	(Chinese Taipei) Huang C-p	12	21	18
7	(China) Han Y	21	25
(Japan) A Ohori	18	23
(China) Zhang YM	21	21
(India) A Kashyap	12	17

Second round
4	(Chinese Taipei) Tai T-y	21	21
Q3	(Malaysia) Letshanaa K	15	5
7	(China) Han Y	10	17
(China) Zhang YM	21	21

Quarter-finals
4	(Chinese Taipei) Tai T-y	21	21
(China) Zhang YM	17	15

=== Bottom half ===
==== Section 3 ====
First round
PFQ	(India) T Hemanth	11	17
(Japan) S Kawakami	21	21
Q1	(South Korea) Kim J-e	11	13
8	(China) Wang ZY	21	21
(India) P. V. Sindhu	18	21	13
(Chinese Taipei) Pai Y-p	21	10	21
PFQ	(India) A Chaliha	13	12
3	(China) Chen YF	21	21

Second round
(Japan) S Kawakami	5	19
8	(China) Wang ZY	21	21
(Chinese Taipei) Pai Y-p	11	12
3	(China) Chen YF	21	21

Quarter-finals
8	(China) Wang ZY	21	23	12
3	(China) Chen YF	10	25	21

==== Section 4 ====
First round
(South Korea) Sim Y-j	21	21
Q2	(South Korea) Park G-e	14	11
(Spain) C Azurmendi	21	15	19
6	(Indonesia) G M Tunjung	16	21	21
(Indonesia) P K Wardani	21	14	21
(Malaysia) Goh J W	18	21	19
(Belgium) L Tan	10	14
2	(South Korea) An S-y	21	21

Second round
(South Korea) Sim Y-j	22	21
6	(Indonesia) G M Tunjung	20	17
(Indonesia) P K Wardani	7	12
2	(South Korea) An S-y	21	21

Quarter-finals
(South Korea) Sim Y-j	7	6
2	(South Korea) An S-y	21	21

== Men's doubles ==
=== Seeds ===
1. (Indonesia) Fajar Alfian / Muhammad Rian Ardianto (Final)
2. (China) Liang Weikeng / Wang Chang (Semi-finals)
3. (India) Satwiksairaj Rankireddy / Chirag Shetty (Champions)
4. (Malaysia) Aaron Chia / Soh Wooi Yik (Second round)
5. (Japan) Takuro Hoki / Yugo Kobayashi (Quarter-finals)
6. (Malaysia) Ong Yew Sin / Teo Ee Yi (Second round)
7. (Indonesia) Mohammad Ahsan / Hendra Setiawan (Withdrew)
8. (China) Liu Yuchen / Ou Xuanyi (Second round)

=== Finals ===
Semi-finals
1	(Indonesia) Fajar Alfian (Indonesia) Muhammad Rian Ardianto	17	21	21
(South Korea) Kang Min-hyuk (South Korea) Seo Seung-jae	21	16	18
3	(India) Satwiksairaj Rankireddy (India) Chirag Shetty	21	24
2	(China) Liang Weikeng (China) Wang Chang	15	22

Final
1	(Indonesia) Fajar Alfian (Indonesia) Muhammad Rian Ardianto	21	13	14
3	(India) Satwiksairaj Rankireddy (India) Chirag Shetty	17	21	21

=== Top half ===
==== Section 1 ====
First round
1	(Indonesia) F Alfian (Indonesia) M R Ardianto	1
Q4	(South Korea) Ko S-h (South Korea) Shin B-c	1^{r}
(Indonesia) L R Carnando (Indonesia) D Marthin	11	21	13
(Chinese Taipei) Lu C-y (Chinese Taipei) Yang P-h	21	16	21
6	(Malaysia) Ong Y S (Malaysia) Teo E Y	22	21
Q1	(South Korea) Cho S-h (South Korea) Na G-m	20	14
(Malaysia) Goh S F (Malaysia) N Izzuddin	10	21	21
(China) Ren XY (China) Tan Q	21	16	16

Second round
1	(Indonesia) F Alfian (Indonesia) M R Ardianto	21	21
(Chinese Taipei) Lu C-y (Chinese Taipei) Yang P-h	19	15
6	(Malaysia) Ong Y S (Malaysia) Teo E Y	23	15
(Malaysia) Goh S F (Malaysia) N Izzuddin	25	21

Quarter-finals
1	(Indonesia) F Alfian (Indonesia) M R Ardianto	21	23
(Malaysia) Goh S F (Malaysia) N Izzuddin	9	21

==== Section 2 ====
First round
4	(Malaysia) A Chia (Malaysia) Soh W Y	21	22
Q3	(South Korea) Ki D-j (South Korea) Kim J-h	18	20
(Japan) K Matsui (Japan) Y Takeuchi	21	21
PFQ	(Malaysia) Boon X Y (Malaysia) Wong T C	13	10
PFQ	(South Korea) Jin Y (South Korea) Na S-s	21	21
(Indonesia) M S Fikri (Indonesia) B Maulana	6	10
(Malaysia) Man W C (Malaysia) Tee K W	14	17
(South Korea) Kang M-h (South Korea) Seo S-j	21	21

Second round
4	(Malaysia) A Chia (Malaysia) Soh W Y	21	18	19
(Japan) K Matsui (Japan) Y Takeuchi	19	21	21
PFQ	(South Korea) Jin Y (South Korea) Na S-s	26	15	18
(South Korea) Kang M-h (South Korea) Seo S-j	24	21	21

Quarter-finals
(Japan) K Matsui (Japan) Y Takeuchi	20	21	14
(South Korea) Kang M-h (South Korea) Seo S-j	22	18	21

=== Bottom half ===
==== Section 3 ====
First round
(Indonesia) P Kusumawardana (Indonesia) Y Rambitan	21	21
(Denmark) J Bay (Denmark) L Mølhede	18	16
PFQ	(Philippines) C Bernardo (Philippines) A Morada	13	10
5	(Japan) T Hoki (Japan) Y Kobayashi	21	21
(Japan) A Koga (Japan) T Saito	16	17
(China) He JT (China) Zhou HD	21	21
(Thailand) S Jomkoh (Thailand) K Kedren	16	14
3	(India) S Rankireddy (India) C Shetty	21	21

Second round
(Indonesia) P Kusumawardana (Indonesia) Y Rambitan	15	15
5	(Japan) T Hoki (Japan) Y Kobayashi	21	21
(China) He JT (China) Zhou HD	17	15
3	(India) S Rankireddy (India) C Shetty	21	21

Quarter-finals
5	(Japan) T Hoki (Japan) Y Kobayashi	14	17
3	(India) S Rankireddy (India) C Shetty	21	21

==== Section 4 ====
First round
Q2	(South Korea) Kim Y-h (South Korea) Wang C	21	21
(South Korea) Kim G-j (South Korea) Kim S-r	14	12
(India) M.R. Arjun (India) D Kapila	5^{r}
8	(China) Liu YC (China) Ou XY	6
(Chinese Taipei) Lee J-h (Chinese Taipei) Yang P-hs	16	21	21
PFQ	(Malaysia) N M Azriyn A (Malaysia) Tan W K	21	15	16
(Japan) A Endo (Japan) Y Takei	15	18
2	(China) Liang WK (China) Wang C	21	21

Second round
Q2	(South Korea) Kim Y-h (South Korea) Wang C	21	16	21
8	(China) Liu YC (China) Ou XY	17	21	17
(Chinese Taipei) Lee J-h (Chinese Taipei) Yang P-hs
2	(China) Liang WK (China) Wang C	w	/	o

Quarter-finals
Q2	(South Korea) Kim Y-h (South Korea) Wang C	11	10
2	(China) Liang WK (China) Wang C	21	21

== Women's doubles ==
=== Seeds ===
1. (China) Chen Qingchen / Jia Yifan (Champions)
2. (South Korea) Baek Ha-na / Lee So-hee (Quarter-finals)
3. (China) Zhang Shuxian / Zheng Yu (Semi-finals)
4. (South Korea) Kim So-yeong / Kong Hee-yong (Final)
5. (Japan) Mayu Matsumoto / Wakana Nagahara (Semi-finals)
6. (South Korea) Jeong Na-eun / Kim Hye-jeong (First round)
7. (Japan) Yuki Fukushima / Sayaka Hirota (Second round)
8. (Japan) Nami Matsuyama / Chiharu Shida (First round)

=== Finals ===
Semi-finals
1	(China) Chen Qingchen (China) Jia Yifan	21	21
3	(China) Zhang Shuxian (China) Zheng Yu	12	12
4	(South Korea) Kim So-yeong (South Korea) Kong Hee-yong	21	19	21
5	(Japan) Mayu Matsumoto (Japan) Wakana Nagahara	16	21	12

Final
1	(China) Chen Qingchen (China) Jia Yifan	21	17	21
4	(South Korea) Kim So-yeong (South Korea) Kong Hee-yong	10	21	7

=== Top half ===
==== Section 1 ====
First round
(Malaysia) P Tan (Malaysia) T Muralitharan	21	15	21
(Japan) R Hirokami (Japan) Y Kato	17	21	15
8	(Japan) N Matsuyama (Japan) C Shida	17	16
(Japan) R Iwanaga (Japan) K Nakanishi	21	21
(United States) F Corbett (United States) A Lee
(Chinese Taipei) Liu C-y (Chinese Taipei) Wang Y-q	w	/	o

Second round
1	(China) Chen QC (China) Jia YF	21	17	21
(Malaysia) P Tan (Malaysia) T Muralitharan	17	21	19
(Japan) R Iwanaga (Japan) K Nakanishi	21	21
(Chinese Taipei) Liu C-y (Chinese Taipei) Wang Y-q	12	16

Quarter-finals
1	(China) Chen QC (China) Jia YF	15	21	21
(Japan) R Iwanaga (Japan) K Nakanishi	21	9	7

==== Section 2 ====
First round
(Singapore) Jin YJ (Singapore) C Wong	18	21	24
(South Korea) Kim H-r (South Korea) Lee J-h	21	15	22
6	(South Korea) Jeong N-e (South Korea) Kim H-j	12^{r}
(Chinese Taipei) Hu L-f (Chinese Taipei) Lin X-m	7
(Canada) C Choi (Canada) J Wu	d	n	s
(India) R Panda (India) S Panda	d	n	s

Second round
3	(China) Zhang SX (China) Zheng Y	21	21
(Singapore) Jin YJ (Singapore) C Wong	11	11
(Chinese Taipei) Hu L-f (Chinese Taipei) Lin X-m	w	/	o

Quarter-finals
3	(China) Zhang SX (China) Zheng Y	21	22
(Chinese Taipei) Hu L-f (Chinese Taipei) Lin X-m	12	20

=== Bottom half ===
==== Section 3 ====
First round
(Japan) R Miyaura (Japan) A Sakuramoto	18	21
(China) Li WM (China) Liu XX	21	23
(India) T Crasto (India) A Ponnappa
7	(Japan) Y Fukushima (Japan) S Hirota	w	/	o
(Thailand) P Pattanawaritthipan (Thailand) A Povanon	11	8
(South Korea) Lee Y-l (South Korea) Shin S-c	21	21

Second round
(China) Li WM (China) Liu XX	10	24	26
7	(Japan) Y Fukushima (Japan) S Hirota	21	22	24
(South Korea) Lee Y-l (South Korea) Shin S-c	13	10
4	(South Korea) Kim S-y (South Korea) Kong H-y	21	21

Quarter-finals
(China) Li WM (China) Liu XX	16	22	12
4	(South Korea) Kim S-y (South Korea) Kong H-y	21	20	21

==== Section 4 ====
First round
(United States) P L Cao Hok (United States) L Lam	19	17
(Hong Kong) Yeung N T (Hong Kong) Yeung P L	21	21
(Malaysia) V Hoo (Malaysia) Lim C S	10	10
5	(Japan) M Matsumoto (Japan) W Nagahara	21	21
(India) T Jolly (India) G G Pullela	w	/	o
(Bulgaria) G Stoeva (Bulgaria) S Stoeva

Second round
(Hong Kong) Yeung N T (Hong Kong) Yeung P L	15	16
5	(Japan) M Matsumoto (Japan) W Nagahara	21	21
(India) T Jolly (India) G G Pullela	11	4
2	(South Korea) Baek H-n (South Korea) Lee S-h	21	21

Quarter-finals
5	(Japan) M Matsumoto (Japan) W Nagahara	21	21
2	(South Korea) Baek H-n (South Korea) Lee S-h	19	17

== Mixed doubles ==
=== Seeds ===
1. (China) Zheng Siwei / Huang Yaqiong (Quarter-finals)
2. (Thailand) Dechapol Puavaranukroh / Sapsiree Taerattanachai (Semi-finals)
3. (Japan) Yuta Watanabe / Arisa Higashino (Semi-finals)
4. (China) Feng Yanzhe / Huang Dongping (Champions)
5. (South Korea) Kim Won-ho / Jeong Na-eun (Withdrew)
6. (South Korea) Seo Seung-jae / Chae Yoo-jung (Quarter-finals)
7. (Malaysia) Goh Soon Huat / Shevon Jemie Lai (Second round)
8. (China) Jiang Zhenbang / Wei Yaxin (Final)

=== Finals ===
Semi-finals
8	(China) Jiang Zhenbang (China) Wei Yaxin	21	20	21
3	(Japan) Yuta Watanabe (Japan) Arisa Higashino	12	22	12
4	(China) Feng Yanzhe (China) Huang Dongping	21	21
2	(Thailand) Dechapol Puavaranukroh (Thailand) Sapsiree Taerattanachai	18	14

Final
8	(China) Jiang Zhenbang (China) Wei Yaxin	16	13
4	(China) Feng Yanzhe (China) Huang Dongping	21	21

=== Top half ===
==== Section 1 ====
First round
1	(China) Zheng SW (China) Huang YQ	21	21
(Japan) K Yamashita (Japan) N Shinoya	3	16
(Singapore) T Hee (Singapore) J Tan
(Indonesia) P Jordan (Indonesia) M D Oktavianti	w	/	o
8	(China) Jiang ZB (China) Wei YX	21	21
(South Korea) Kim Y-h (South Korea) Lee Y-l	6	13
(India) B S Reddy (India) A Ponnappa	21	21	12
(South Korea) Cho S-h (South Korea) Lee J-h	23	13	21

Second round
1	(China) Zheng SW (China) Huang YQ	21	21
(Indonesia) P Jordan (Indonesia) M D Oktavianti	16	17
8	(China) Jiang ZB (China) Wei YX	21	21
(South Korea) Cho S-h (South Korea) Lee J-h	8	18

Quarter-finals
1	(China) Zheng SW (China) Huang YQ	16	17
8	(China) Jiang ZB (China) Wei YX	21	21

==== Section 2 ====
First round
3	(Japan) Y Watanabe (Japan) A Higashino	21	21
(Hong Kong) Lee C H (Hong Kong) Ng T Y	10	12
(Hong Kong) Tang C M (Hong Kong) Tse Y S	w	/	o
(Israel) M Zilberman (Israel) S Zilberman
5	(South Korea) Kim W-h (South Korea) Jeong N-e	d	n	s
(Canada) T A Lindeman (Canada) J Wu	d	n	s
(South Korea) Ko S-h (South Korea) Eom H-w	21	21
(Malaysia) Chan P S (Malaysia) Cheah Y S	19	17

Second round
3	(Japan) Y Watanabe (Japan) A Higashino	21	21
(Hong Kong) Tang C M (Hong Kong) Tse Y S	17	18
(South Korea) Ko S-h (South Korea) Eom H-w	w	/	o

Quarter-finals
3	(Japan) Y Watanabe (Japan) A Higashino	21	21
(South Korea) Ko S-h (South Korea) Eom H-w	17	9

=== Bottom half ===
==== Section 3 ====
First round
(Japan) H Midorikawa (Japan) N Saito	21	21
(Philippines) S J Padiz (Philippines) E C Inlayo	17	16
(Malaysia) Chen T J (Malaysia) Toh E W	16	16
7	(Malaysia) Goh S H (Malaysia) S J Lai	21	21
(Philippines) A Morada (Philippines) A Y Leonardo	17	17
(India) R Kapoor (India) S Reddy	21	21
(Thailand) S Jomkoh (Thailand) S Paewsampran	17	13
4	(China) Feng YZ (China) Huang DP	21	21

Second round
(Japan) H Midorikawa (Japan) N Saito	21	21
7	(Malaysia) Goh S H (Malaysia) S J Lai	17	13
(India) R Kapoor (India) S Reddy	15	12
4	(China) Feng YZ (China) Huang DP	21	21

Quarter-finals
(Japan) H Midorikawa (Japan) N Saito	10	15
4	(China) Feng YZ (China) Huang DP	21	21

==== Section 4 ====
First round
(Indonesia) D Ferdinansyah (Indonesia) G E Widjaja	21	20
(Chinese Taipei) Yang P-hs (Chinese Taipei) Hu L-f	10	17^{r}
(South Korea) Wang C (South Korea) Shin S-c	15	11
6	(South Korea) Seo S-j (South Korea) Chae Y-j	21	21
(Malaysia) Tan K M (Malaysia) Lai P J	21	27
(Japan) Y Kaneko (Japan) M Matsutomo	15	25
(Malaysia) Hoo P R (Malaysia) Teoh M X	17	10
2	(Thailand) D Puavaranukroh (Thailand) S Taerattanachai	21	21

Second round
(Indonesia) D Ferdinansyah (Indonesia) G E Widjaja	14	22	11
6	(South Korea) Seo S-j (South Korea) Chae Y-j	21	20	21
(Malaysia) Tan K M (Malaysia) Lai P J	9	7
2	(Thailand) D Puavaranukroh (Thailand) S Taerattanachai	21	21

Quarter-finals
6	(South Korea) Seo S-j (South Korea) Chae Y-j	21	14	19
2	(Thailand) D Puavaranukroh (Thailand) S Taerattanachai	18	21	21

Preceded by 2023 US Open	BWF World Tour; 2023 BWF season	Succeeded by 2023 Japan Open
