= 2019 BWF World Junior Championships – Boys' doubles =

2019 BWF World Junior Championships Boys' Doubles
Tournament details
- Dates: 7 – 13 October 2019
- Edition: 21st
- Level: International
- Venue: Kazan Gymnastics Center
- Location: Kazan, Russia

The boys' doubles of the tournament 2019 BWF World Junior Championships will be held from 7 to 13 October 2019. The defending champions is Di Zijian/Wang Chang from China.

== Seeds ==
Click on the seed number of a player to go to their draw section.

1. (China) Di Zijian / Wang Chang (final)
2. (Indonesia) Leo Rolly Carnando / Daniel Marthin (champions)
3. (China) Dai Enyi / Feng Yanzhe (semifinals)
4. (England) William Jones / Brandon Yap (fourth round)
5. (England) Rory Easton / Ethan van Leeuwen (quarterfinals)
6. (Japan) Takuma Kawamoto / Tsubasa Kawamura (semifinals)
7. (Thailand) Thanawin Madee / Ratchapol Makkasasithorn (third round)
8. (Malaysia) Ooi Jhy Dar / Yap Roy King (third round)

9. (Thailand) Tanadon Punpanich / Sirawit Sothon (fourth round)
10. (Chinese Taipei) Chen Zhi-ray / Cheng Kai-wen (fourth round)
11. (Indonesia) Dwiki Rafian Restu / Bernadus Bagas Kusuma Wardana (fourth round)
12. (Spain) Joan Monroy / Carlos Piris (fourth round)
13. (Singapore) Howin Wong / Aaron Yong (fourth round)
14. (Russia) Egor Kholkin / Georgii Lebedev (second round)
15. (Denmark) Rasmus Espersen / Marcus Rindshøj (fourth round)
16. (Chinese Taipei) Wei Chun-wei / Wu Guan-xun (third round)

== Draw ==
=== Finals ===
Quarterfinals
1	(China) Di Zijian (China) Wang Chang	21	21
(Hong Kong) Ko Shing Hei (Hong Kong) Lui Chun Wai	14	16
(China) Liu Dewei (China) Zhang Xunjin	13	15
6	(Japan) Takuma Kawamoto (Japan) Tsubasa Kawamura	21	21
(Malaysia) Junaidi Arif (Malaysia) Muhammad Haikal	13	15
3	(China) Dai Enyi (China) Feng Yanzhe	21	21
5	(England) Rory Easton (England) Ethan van Leeuwen	13	11
2	(Indonesia) Leo Rolly Carnando (Indonesia) Daniel Marthin	21	21

Semifinals
1	(China) Di Zijian (China) Wang Chang	21	21
6	(Japan) Takuma Kawamoto (Japan) Tsubasa Kawamura	11	18
3	(China) Dai Enyi (China) Feng Yanzhe	15	10
2	(Indonesia) Leo Rolly Carnando (Indonesia) Daniel Marthin	21	21

Finals
1	(China) Di Zijian (China) Wang Chang	19	18
2	(Indonesia) Leo Rolly Carnando (Indonesia) Daniel Marthin	21	21

=== Top half ===
==== Section 1 ====
First Round
(Germany) M Bourakkadi (Germany) Oei K-y	14	14
(South Korea) Kim B-j (South Korea) Kim T-r	21	21
(Switzerland) Y Orteu (Switzerland) Pham M Q	21	21
(Latvia) M Ķirkums (Latvia) K Vārna	5	5

Second Round
1	(China) Di ZJ (China) Wang C	21	21
(Sri Lanka) L de Silva (Sri Lanka) T Palliyaguru	7	8
(Uzbekistan) B Kuchkorbaev (Uzbekistan) A Muminov	2	10
(South Korea) Kim B-j (South Korea) Kim T-r	21	21
9	(Thailand) T Punpanich (Thailand) S Sothon	21	21
(Belarus) H Shvydkou (Latvia) A Zandovskis	4	5
(Scotland) J Apiliga (Scotland) A Pringle	21	21
(Switzerland) Y Orteu (Switzerland) Pham M Q	12	15

Third Round
1	(China) Di ZJ (China) Wang C	21	21
(South Korea) Kim B-j (South Korea) Kim T-r	7	11
9	(Thailand) T Punpanich (Thailand) S Sothon	21	21
(Scotland) J Apiliga (Scotland) A Pringle	11	17

Fourth Round
1	(China) Di ZJ (China) Wang C	21	21
9	(Thailand) T Punpanich (Thailand) S Sothon	14	8

==== Section 2 ====
First Round
(Hong Kong) Ko S H (Hong Kong) Lui C W	21	21
(New Zealand) R Tong (New Zealand) J Wang	8	4
(Russia) T Gareev (Russia) T Valiullin	18	21	16
(Denmark) W K Boe (Denmark) M Vestergaard	21	19	21

Second Round
8	(Malaysia) Ooi J D (Malaysia) Yap R K	21	21
(India) Y Raikwar (India) I Sonowal	12	6
(Indonesia) M G R Ramadhan (Indonesia) G A Satriyadi	12	21
(Hong Kong) Ko S H (Hong Kong) Lui C W	21	23
12	(Spain) J Monroy (Spain) C Piris	21	21
(Lithuania) D Berzanskis (Lithuania) J Petkus	9	14
(France) K Lovang (France) C Popov	19	21	17
(Denmark) W K Boe (Denmark) M Vestergaard	21	16	21

Third Round
8	(Malaysia) Ooi J D (Malaysia) Yap R K	18	17
(Hong Kong) Ko S H (Hong Kong) Lui C W	21	21
12	(Spain) J Monroy (Spain) C Piris	15	21	21
(Denmark) W K Boe (Denmark) M Vestergaard	21	14	15

Fourth Round
(Hong Kong) Ko S H (Hong Kong) Lui C W	21	21
12	(Spain) J Monroy (Spain) C Piris	10	10

==== Section 3 ====
First Round
(Singapore) D Ng (Singapore) J Sim	21	16	21
(India) Q M Mohammed (India) B Navaneeth	18	21	11
(Canada) A Bianchini (Canada) J Chien	21	21
(United States) H Tang (United States) J Yang	14	17

Second Round
4	(England) W Jones (England) B Yap	22	21
(South Korea) Jo S-m (South Korea) Lee Y-j	20	15
(Czech Republic) J Janoštík (Hungary) K Toth	14	10
(Singapore) D Ng (Singapore) J Sim	21	21
16	(Chinese Taipei) Wei C-w (Chinese Taipei) Wu G-x	21	21
(Macau) Lam H I (Macau) Ng K S	12	9
(China) Liu DW (China) Zhang XJ	21	21
(Canada) A Bianchini (Canada) J Chien	11	12

Third Round
4	(England) W Jones (England) B Yap	14	21	21
(Singapore) D Ng (Singapore) J Sim	21	18	15
16	(Chinese Taipei) Wei C-w (Chinese Taipei) Wu G-x	16	21	16
(China) Liu DW (China) Zhang XJ	21	19	21

Fourth Round
4	(England) W Jones (England) B Yap	16	21	16
(China) Liu DW (China) Zhang XJ	21	17	21

==== Section 4 ====
First Round
(Czech Republic) V Kulíšek (Czech Republic) T Švejda	21	21
(Mongolia) S Enkhbat (Mongolia) Y-E Munkhbaatar	8	2
(Kazakhstan) B Nazarov (Kazakhstan) A Shalagin	10	9
(Finland) T Lindelöf (Finland) J Oldorff	21	21

Second Round
6	(Japan) T Kawamoto (Japan) T Kawamura	21	21
(Australia) R Tang (Australia) O Zhao	14	16
(Portugal) H Fernandes (Portugal) D Gloria	11	8
(Czech Republic) V Kulíšek (Czech Republic) T Švejda	21	21
11	(Indonesia) D R Restu (Indonesia) B B Wardana	21	21
(Switzerland) A Boudier (Latvia) N Rudolf	12	12
(Norway) D Gataullin (Norway) A R Huus	18	13
(Finland) T Lindelöf (Finland) J Oldorff	21	21

Third Round
6	(Japan) T Kawamoto (Japan) T Kawamura	21	21
(Czech Republic) V Kulíšek (Czech Republic) T Švejda	18	12
11	(Indonesia) D R Restu (Indonesia) B B Wardana	21	21
(Finland) T Lindelöf (Finland) J Oldorff	14	9

Fourth Round
6	(Japan) T Kawamoto (Japan) T Kawamura	21	21
11	(Indonesia) D R Restu (Indonesia) B B Wardana	14	15

=== Bottom half ===
==== Section 5 ====
First Round
(Sri Lanka) C Dias (Sri Lanka) V Nettasinghe	21	21
(Peru) M Novoa (Peru) B Roque	6	12
(Uganda) B Kasirye (Uganda) A Vaheed	4	11
(Netherlands) F Achtoven (Netherlands) W van der Aar	21	21
(Malaysia) A Junaidi (Malaysia) M Haikal	21	21
(Kazakhstan) A Korolev (Kazakhstan) V Zeiferling	5	4

Second Round
(Sri Lanka) C Dias (Sri Lanka) V Nettasinghe	10	22
(Netherlands) F Achtoven (Netherlands) W van der Aar	21	24
(Germany) M Datko (Germany) K Maurer	13	13
10	(Chinese Taipei) Chen Z-r (Chinese Taipei) Cheng K-w	21	21
(Malaysia) A Junaidi (Malaysia) M Haikal	21	21
(Belarus) A Aliaksandrovich (Belarus) I Larushyn	10	12
(Norway) L Smith-Meyer (Norway) J Østhassel	11	13
7	(Thailand) T Madee (Thailand) R Makkasasithorn	21	21

Third Round
(Netherlands) F Achtoven (Netherlands) W van der Aar	10	11
10	(Chinese Taipei) Chen Z-r (Chinese Taipei) Cheng K-w	21	21
(Malaysia) A Junaidi (Malaysia) M Haikal	21	21
7	(Thailand) T Madee (Thailand) R Makkasasithorn	19	17

Fourth Round
10	(Chinese Taipei) Chen Z-r (Chinese Taipei) Cheng K-w	18	15
(Malaysia) A Junaidi (Malaysia) M Haikal	21	21

==== Section 6 ====
First Round
(Japan) H Nishi (Japan) T Shibata	21	21
(Canada) Chen YZ (Canada) C Jia	14	18
(South Korea) Heo T-y (South Korea) Park S-m	21	21
(Spain) A Baschwitz (Spain) T Toledano	16	12

Second Round
(Japan) H Nishi (Japan) T Shibata	21	21
(Macau) Leong I C (Macau) Vong K W	13	12
(Sweden) J Ekman (Sweden) J Hansson	11	13
13	(Singapore) H Wong (Singapore) A Yong	21	21
(South Korea) Heo T-y (South Korea) Park S-m	21	21
(Portugal) R Almeida (Portugal) J Chang	8	11
(Slovakia) A Antoska (Slovakia) J Horak	18	12
3	(China) Dai EY (China) Feng YZ	21	21

Third Round
(Japan) H Nishi (Japan) T Shibata	24	16
13	(Singapore) H Wong (Singapore) A Yong	26	21
(South Korea) Heo T-y (South Korea) Park S-m	13	11
3	(China) Dai EY (China) Feng YZ	21	21

Fourth Round
13	(Singapore) H Wong (Singapore) A Yong	10	11
3	(China) Dai EY (China) Feng YZ	21	21

==== Section 7 ====
First Round
(Australia) R Agustino (Australia) J Yu	21	21
(Hungary) B B Kiss (Hungary) G Szita	11	18
(New Zealand) J Feng (New Zealand) E Lau	12	12
(France) A Lanier (France) L Renoir	21	21

Second Round
(Australia) R Agustino (Australia) J Yu	9	12
(India) M S Khwairakpam (India) D S Konthoujam	21	21
(Chinese Taipei) Lin K-t (Chinese Taipei) Su L-y	21	17	21
14	(Russia) E Kholkin (Russia) G Lebedev	19	21	13
(France) A Lanier (France) L Renoir	21	21
(Israel) M Grinblat (Greece) V R Kiosses	14	12
(Hong Kong) J Gunawan (Hong Kong) Hung K C	13	17
5	(England) R Easton (England) E van Leeuwen	21	21

Third Round
(India) M S Khwairakpam (India) D S Konthoujam	21	21
(Chinese Taipei) Lin K-t (Chinese Taipei) Su L-y	16	17
(France) A Lanier (France) L Renoir	12	21	18
5	(England) R Easton (England) E van Leeuwen	21	18	21

Fourth Round
(India) M S Khwairakpam (India) D S Konthoujam	21	17	14
5	(England) R Easton (England) E van Leeuwen	16	21	21

==== Section 8 ====
First Round
(Iceland) A Broddason (Iceland) B M Ellertsson	14	9
(Scotland) M McGuire (Scotland) C Smith	21	21
(Uzbekistan) A Olimjanov (Uzbekistan) A Sultanov	12	2
(Malaysia) Ching K F (Malaysia) Lwi S H	21	21

Second Round
(Scotland) M McGuire (Scotland) C Smith	21	18	21
(United States) W Tsai (United States) J Zhang	19	21	19
(Armenia) M Harutyunyan (Armenia) A Vardanyan	4	6
15	(Denmark) R Espersen (Denmark) M Rindshøj	21	21
(Malaysia) Ching K F (Malaysia) Lwi S H	21	21
(Finland) S Emran (Finland) J Kuoppala	10	5
(Japan) Y Fujisawa (Japan) K Kumagai	18	18
2	(Indonesia) L R Carnando (Indonesia) D Marthin	21	21

Third Round
(Scotland) M McGuire (Scotland) C Smith	6	12
15	(Denmark) R Espersen (Denmark) M Rindshøj	21	21
(Malaysia) Ching K F (Malaysia) Lwi S H	11	19
2	(Indonesia) L R Carnando (Indonesia) D Marthin	21	21

Fourth Round
15	(Denmark) R Espersen (Denmark) M Rindshøj	17	9
2	(Indonesia) L R Carnando (Indonesia) D Marthin	21	21
