= 2019 Badminton Asia Junior Championships – Boys' doubles =

Tournament details
- Dates: 24 – 28 July 2019
- Edition: 22
- Venue: Suzhou Olympic Sports Centre
- Location: Suzhou, China

The boys' doubles tournament of the 2019 Badminton Asia Junior Championships will be held from 24 to 28 July. Di Zijian / Wang Chang from China clinched this title in the last edition.

== Seeds ==
Seeds were announced on 2 July.

1. (China) Di Zijian / Wang Chang (final)
2. (Indonesia) Leo Rolly Carnando / Daniel Marthin (champions)
3. (China) Dai Enyi / Feng Yanzhe (semifinals)
4. (Thailand) Thanawin Madee / Ratchapol Makkasasithorn (third round)
5. (Thailand) Tanadon Punpanich / Sirawit Sothon (second round)
6. (Chinese Taipei) Wei Chun-wei / Wu Guan-xun (second round)
7. (South Korea) Ki Dong-ju / Kim Joon-young (quarterfinals)
8. (China) Jiang Zhenbang / Liang Yongwang (third round)

== Draw ==
=== Finals ===
Quarterfinals
1 | (China) Di Zijian (China) Wang Chang | 21 | 21
(Malaysia) Ooi Jhy Dar (Malaysia) Yap Roy King | 9 | 13
(India) Ishaan Bhatnagar (India) Vishnu Vardhan Goud Panjala | 14 | 19
(Singapore) Howin Wong (Singapore) Aaron Yong | 21 | 21
(Chinese Taipei) Chen Zhi-ray (Chinese Taipei) Cheng Kai-wen | 8 | 21 | 13
3 | (China) Dai Enyi (China) Feng Yanzhe | 21 | 16 | 21
7 | (South Korea) Ki Dong-ju (South Korea) Kim Joon-young | 21 | 16 | 18
2 | (Indonesia) Leo Rolly Carnando (Indonesia) Daniel Marthin | 18 | 21 | 21

Semifinals
1 | (China) Di Zijian (China) Wang Chang | 21 | 21
(Singapore) Howin Wong (Singapore) Aaron Yong | 15 | 11
3 | (China) Dai Enyi (China) Feng Yanzhe | 13 | 21 | 15
2 | (Indonesia) Leo Rolly Carnando (Indonesia) Daniel Marthin | 21 | 11 | 21

Final
1 | (China) Di Zijian (China) Wang Chang | 9 | 21 | 19
2 | (Indonesia) Leo Rolly Carnando (Indonesia) Daniel Marthin | 21 | 15 | 21

=== Top half ===
==== Section 1 ====
First round

Second round
1 | (China) Di ZJ (China) Wang C | 21 | 21
(South Korea) Lee M-s (South Korea) Noh M-w | 14 | 14
(Indonesia) M. L A Apriyanda (Indonesia) Y Pamungkas | 21 | 21
(Thailand) P Tangsrirapeephan (Thailand) Apichasit Teerawiwat | 18 | 15
6 | (Chinese Taipei) Wei C-w (Chinese Taipei) Wu G-x | 22 | 21 | 16
(Malaysia) Ooi J D (Malaysia) Yap R K | 24 | 19 | 21
(Vietnam) Nguyen D H (Vietnam) Nguyen T T | w | / | o
(Mongolia) Y Baldandorj (Mongolia) S Lkhaasuren

Third round
1 | (China) Di ZJ (China) Wang C | 21 | 21
(Indonesia) M. L A Apriyanda (Indonesia) Y Pamungkas | 18 | 8
(Malaysia) Ooi J D (Malaysia) Yap R K | 21 | 20 | 21
(Vietnam) Nguyen D H (Vietnam) Nguyen T T | 11 | 22 | 14

Quarterfinals
1 | (China) Di ZJ (China) Wang C | 21 | 21
(Malaysia) Ooi J D (Malaysia) Yap R K | 9 | 13

==== Section 2 ====
First round
(Singapore) H Wong (Singapore) A Yong | 21 | 21
(Indonesia) D R Restu (Indonesia) B B K Wardana | 14 | 19

Second round
4 | (Thailand) T Madee (Thailand) R Makkasasithorn | 21 | 21
(Macau) Leong I C (Macau) Ng K S | 6 | 6
(India) I Bhatnagar (India) V V G Panjala | 21 | 21
(Bangladesh) Md. A H Lukman (Bangladesh) G Singha | 10 | 15
8 | (China) Jiang ZB (China) Liang YW | 21 | 21
(South Korea) Park H-s (South Korea) Park S-y | 14 | 14
(Hong Kong) J Gunawan (Hong Kong) Hung K C | 19 | 14
(Singapore) H Wong (Singapore) A Yong | 21 | 21

Third round
4 | (Thailand) T Madee (Thailand) R Makkasasithorn | 14 | 26 | 16
(India) I Bhatnagar (India) V V G Panjala | 21 | 24 | 21
8 | (China) Jiang ZB (China) Liang YW | 21 | 23 | 17
(Singapore) H Wong (Singapore) A Yong | 6 | 25 | 21

Quarterfinals
(India) I Bhatnagar (India) V V G Panjala | 14 | 19
(Singapore) H Wong (Singapore) A Yong | 21 | 21

=== Bottom half ===
==== Section 3 ====
First round
(Malaysia) Ching K F (Malaysia) Loo B K | 21 | 21
(Bangladesh) H Mohammad (Bangladesh) K A Soad | 10 | 8

Second round
(Malaysia) Ching K F (Malaysia) Loo B K | 20 | 11
(Chinese Taipei) Chen Z-r (Chinese Taipei) Cheng K-w | 22 | 21
(China) Liu DW (China) Zheng XJ | 21 | 21
5 | (Thailand) T Punpanich (Thailand) S Sothon | 14 | 17
(Hong Kong) Hong F (Hong Kong) Poon C L | 18 | 11
(India) P. S. Ravikrishna (India) M R Sumith | 21 | 21
(Nepal) P Dahal (Nepal) P Maharjan | 7 | 6
3 | (China) Dai EY (China) Feng YZ | 21 | 21

Third round
(Chinese Taipei) Chen Z-r (Chinese Taipei) Cheng K-w | 21 | 15 | 21
(China) Liu DW (China) Zheng XJ | 17 | 21 | 16
(India) P. S. Ravikrishna (India) M R Sumith | 9 | 12
3 | (China) Dai EY (China) Feng YZ | 21 | 21

Quarterfinals
(Chinese Taipei) Chen Z-r (Chinese Taipei) Cheng K-w | 8 | 21 | 13
3 | (China) Dai EY (China) Feng YZ | 21 | 16 | 21

==== Section 4 ====
First round
(India) M S Khwairakpam (India) D S Konthoujam | 21 | 21
(Singapore) D Ng (Singapore) J Sim | 8 | 14

Second round
(India) M S Khwairakpam (India) D S Konthoujam | 21 | 21
(Sri Lanka) C Dias (Sri Lanka) C Illeperumachchi | 10 | 11
(China) Peng JQ (China) Zeng WH | 21 | 18 | 24
7 | (South Korea) Ki D-j (South Korea) Kim J-y | 18 | 21 | 26
(Chinese Taipei) Hu H-s (Chinese Taipei) Liu C-k | w | / | o
(Malaysia) Chua Y C (Malaysia) Lwi S H
(Hong Kong) Ko S H (Hong Kong) Lui C W | 13 | 16
2 | (Indonesia) L R Carnando (Indonesia) D Marthin | 21 | 21

Third round
(India) M S Khwairakpam (India) D S Konthoujam | 10 | 21 | 10
7 | (South Korea) Ki D-j (South Korea) Kim J-y | 21 | 17 | 21
(Chinese Taipei) Hu H-s (Chinese Taipei) Liu C-k | 14 | 15
2 | (Indonesia) L R Carnando (Indonesia) D Marthin | 21 | 21

Quarterfinals
7 | (South Korea) Ki D-j (South Korea) Kim J-y | 21 | 16 | 18
2 | (Indonesia) L R Carnando (Indonesia) D Marthin | 18 | 21 | 21
