= Daniel Marthin =

Indonesian badminton player (born 2001)

Personal information
- Born: 31 July 2001 (age 25) Jakarta, Indonesia
- Height: 1.82 m (6 ft 0 in)

Sport
- Country: Indonesia
- Sport: Badminton
- Handedness: Right

Men's & mixed doubles
- Highest ranking: 9 (MD with Muhammad Shohibul Fikri, 22 July 2025); 9 (MD with Leo Rolly Carnando, 23 May 2023); 145 (XD with Nita Violina Marwah, 10 December 2019)
- Current ranking: 18 (MD with Leo Rolly Carnando, 17 November 2026)
- BWF profile
Medal record
Men's badminton
Representing Indonesia
Sudirman Cup
Bronze medal – third place	2025 Xiamen	Mixed team
Thomas Cup
Gold medal – first place	2020 Aarhus	Men's team
Silver medal – second place	2024 Chengdu	Men's team
Asian Games
Gold medal – first place	2026 Aichi–Nagoya	Men's team
Gold medal – first place	2026 Aichi–Nagoya	Men's doubles
Asia Mixed Team Championships
Gold medal – first place	2025 Qingdao	Mixed team
Asia Team Championships
Silver medal – second place	2022 Selangor	Men's team
SEA Games
Gold medal – first place	2021 Vietnam	Men's doubles
Bronze medal – third place	2021 Vietnam	Men's team
World Junior Championships
Gold medal – first place	2019 Kazan	Boys' doubles
Gold medal – first place	2019 Kazan	Mixed team
Bronze medal – third place	2018 Markham	Mixed team
Asian Junior Championships
Gold medal – first place	2019 Suzhou	Boys' doubles
Silver medal – second place	2019 Suzhou	Mixed team
Bronze medal – third place	2018 Jakarta	Mixed team

Daniel Marthin (born 31 July 2001) is an Indonesian badminton player affiliated with Djarum club since 2015. He was a champion at the 2019 Asian and World Junior Championships in the boys' doubles event. Marthin was part of Indonesia winning team at the 2020 Thomas Cup and 2026 Asian Games.

== Career ==
Since junior, Marthin has focused on playing in the doubles category. In 2016, he won the U–17 Jakarta Open Junior Championships partnered with Febriana Dwipuji Kusuma. He then won the boys' doubles title with Leo Rolly Carnando at the Astec Open Championships in Jakarta, and later at the Singapore Youth International Series. In 2018, Marthin alongside Indonesia team won the bronze medal at the Asian Junior Championships in Jakarta. Unfortunately, in the individual boys' doubles, Marthin and Carnando were defeated in the early stage. In the BWF junior circuit, Marthin with his partner Carnando won the boys' doubles title at the Malaysia and India International Junior tournaments. He later joined Indonesia team at the Markham World Junior Championships, and won a mixed team bronze medal. Marthin claimed his first senior International title by winning the Bangladesh International with Carnando. The duo later won the Turkey International. Together with Djarum team, he won the Junior Super League and Pembangunan Jaya Cup. At the Junior Super League, he is able to attract the attention of badminton observers, because of his attractive playing style.

In 2019, Marthin was selected to join the training at the Indonesia National training center. In March, he won a mixed doubles title with Nita Violina Marwah at the Dutch Junior International, and finished as runner-up in the boys' doubles with Leo Rolly Carnando in the German Junior. In May, he and Carnando won the Jaya Raya Junior Grand Prix beating number 1 seed Di Zijian and Wang Chang. The duo also won the Malaysia International Series, and managed to secure the gold medal at the Asian and World Junior Championships. In the team event, he also helps the National team finished as runner-up in Asian Junior and won the Suhandinata Cup after Indonesia juniors defeating China in the final.

In 2021, Marthin started the year as semi-finalists at the Thailand Open with Leo Rolly Carnando. They later stopped in the quarter-finals at the Swiss Open and Spain Masters. They then reached the finals of the Hylo Open, but was defeated by World number 1 Marcus Fernaldi Gideon and Kevin Sanjaya Sukamuljo in straight game. Marthin made his debut with Indonesia team at the 2020 Thomas Cup. He played two matches in the group stage, and the team won the 2020 Thomas Cup.

In February 2022, Marthin participated in 2022 Badminton Asia Team Championships with Indonesia and lost the title to Malaysia. In March, Marthin and Carnando lost in the quarter-finals All England and Swiss Opens. In May, he won a gold medal in the men's doubles with Carnando and a bronze medal in the men's team at the SEA Games. In July, Marthin and Carnando clinched their first World Tour title at the Singapore Open by beating Fajar Alfian and Muhammad Rian Ardianto in the final.

=== 2023–2025 ===
Kicked off the 2023 season, Marthin competing in four Asian tour. He and his partner, Carnando, had to accept early round defeats in the first two tournaments Malaysia and India Opens. They then emerged victorious in the Indonesia and Thailand Masters, entering them to the top 10 of the BWF world rankings. In the Europe tour from March to April, they opened the tour as the quarter-finalists in the All England Open, they then had to accept first round defeats in two tournaments of Swiss Open and Spain Masters. At the Orléans Masters in France, they reached the semi-finals losing to fellow Indonesian pair Muhammad Shohibul Fikri and Bagas Maulana.

Marthin made his debut at the Asian Championships in Dubai, United Arab Emirates, but he and his partner, Carnando, had to lose in the first round from 2nd seed Malaysian pair Aaron Chia and Soh Wooi Yik. Marthin alongside the Indonesian team competed at the 2023 Sudirman Cup in Suzhou, China. He and his partner played a match in the group stage, lost against Mark Lamsfuß and Marvin Seidel of Germany. Indonesia advanced to the knockout stage but lost at the quarter-finals against China.

Marthin and Carnando has had ups-and-downs on their subsequent tour. The duo reached the semi-finals in the Malaysia Masters, lost in the first round at the Thailand Open, then reached the quarter-finals in the Singapore, and Indonesia Opens. They then experienced four series early rounds exits in the Korea Open, Japan Open, Australian Open, and the BWF World Championships; before reaching the finals in the Hong Kong Open, settled for the runner-up. Marthin made his debut at the Asian Games in Hangzhou, but unable to win any medals in both the men's doubles and team events.

In 2024, after suffered two consecutive first round exits, in the Malaysia and India Opens, Marthin and his partner, Carnando, won their first title of the year and also defend their title in the Indonesia Masters. In August, Marthin made a new partnership with Muhammad Shohibul Fikri. In both of their first tournaments as a new pair, they were able to reach the semi-finals in the Japan and Korea Opens.

In 2025, Daniel continuing his partnership with Fikri and manage to finish as a runner-up to Seo Seung-jae and Jin Yong from Korea in Thailand Masters. They manage to snatch another runner-up spot in Swiss Open, losing to Kittinupong Kedren and Dechapol Puavaranukroh from Thailand.

== Awards and nominations ==
Award	Year	Category	Result	Ref.
BWF Awards	2019	Eddy Choong Most Promising Player of the Year with Leo Rolly Carnando	Nominated	
Gatra Awards	2021	Sports Category with 2020 Thomas Cup squad	Won	

== Achievements ==
=== Asian Games ===
Men's doubles
Year	Venue	Partner	Opponent	Score	Result	Ref.
2026	Ichinomiya City Municipal Gymnasium, Ichinomiya, Japan	(Indonesia) Leo Rolly Carnando	(China) Liang Weikeng (China) Wang Chang	19–21, 21–13, 21–18	Gold	

=== SEA Games ===
Men's doubles
Year	Venue	Partner	Opponent	Score	Result	Ref.
2021	Bac Giang Gymnasium, Bắc Giang, Vietnam	(Indonesia) Leo Rolly Carnando	(Indonesia) Pramudya Kusumawardana (Indonesia) Yeremia Rambitan	21–17, 21–19	Gold	

=== World Junior Championships ===
Boys' doubles
Year	Venue	Partner	Opponent	Score	Result	Ref.
2019	Kazan Gymnastics Center, Kazan, Russia	(Indonesia) Leo Rolly Carnando	(China) Di Zijian (China) Wang Chang	21–19, 21–18	Gold	

=== Asian Junior Championships ===
Boys' doubles
Year	Venue	Partner	Opponent	Score	Result	Ref.
2019	Suzhou Olympic Sports Centre, Suzhou, China	(Indonesia) Leo Rolly Carnando	(China) Di Zijian (China) Wang Chang	21–9, 15–21, 21–19	Gold	

=== BWF World Tour (6 titles, 5 runners-up) ===
The BWF World Tour, which was announced on 19 March 2017 and implemented in 2018, is a series of elite badminton tournaments sanctioned by the Badminton World Federation (BWF). The BWF World Tour is divided into levels of World Tour Finals, Super 1000, Super 750, Super 500, Super 300, and the BWF Tour Super 100.

Men's doubles
Year	Tournament	Level	Partner	Opponent	Score	Result	Ref.
2021	Hylo Open	Super 500	(Indonesia) Leo Rolly Carnando	(Indonesia) Marcus Fernaldi Gideon (Indonesia) Kevin Sanjaya Sukamuljo	14–21, 19–21	(silver) Runner-up	
2022	Singapore Open	Super 500	(Indonesia) Leo Rolly Carnando	(Indonesia) Fajar Alfian (Indonesia) Muhammad Rian Ardianto	9–21, 21–14, 21–16	(gold) Winner	
2023	Indonesia Masters	Super 500	(Indonesia) Leo Rolly Carnando	(China) He Jiting (China) Zhou Haodong	21–17, 21–16	(gold) Winner	
2023	Thailand Masters	Super 300	(Indonesia) Leo Rolly Carnando	(Chinese Taipei) Su Ching-heng (Chinese Taipei) Ye Hong-wei	21–16, 21–17	(gold) Winner	
2023	Hong Kong Open	Super 500	(Indonesia) Leo Rolly Carnando	(Denmark) Kim Astrup (Denmark) Anders Skaarup Rasmussen	10–21, 24–22, 19–21	(silver) Runner-up	
2024	Indonesia Masters	Super 500	(Indonesia) Leo Rolly Carnando	(Denmark) Kim Astrup (Denmark) Anders Skaarup Rasmussen	21–12, 20–22, 21–11	(gold) Winner	
2025	Thailand Masters	Super 300	(Indonesia) Muhammad Shohibul Fikri	(South Korea) Jin Yong (South Korea) Seo Seung-jae	18–21, 17–21	(silver) Runner-up	
2025	Swiss Open	Super 300	(Indonesia) Muhammad Shohibul Fikri	(Thailand) Kittinupong Kedren (Thailand) Dechapol Puavaranukroh	15–21, 21–18, 14–21	(silver) Runner-up	
2026	Thailand Open	Super 500	(Indonesia) Leo Rolly Carnando	(India) Satwiksairaj Rankireddy (India) Chirag Shetty	21–12, 25–23	(gold) Winner	
2026	Taipei Open	Super 300	(Indonesia) Leo Rolly Carnando	(Malaysia) Aaron Chia (Malaysia) Aaron Tai	23–21, 21–19	(gold) Winner	
2026	Hong Kong Open	Super 500	(Indonesia) Leo Rolly Carnando	(Malaysia) Man Wei Chong (Malaysia) Tee Kai Wun	19–21, 18–21	(silver) Runner-up	

=== BWF International Challenge/Series (3 titles) ===
Men's doubles
Year	Tournament	Partner	Opponent	Score	Result	Ref.
2018	Bangladesh International	(Indonesia) Leo Rolly Carnando	(Thailand) Supak Jomkoh (Thailand) Wachirawit Sothon	21–16, 21–11	(gold) Winner	
2018	Turkey International	(Indonesia) Leo Rolly Carnando	(England) Peter Briggs (England) Gregory Mairs	21–14, 13–21, 23–21	(gold) Winner	
2019	Malaysia International	(Indonesia) Leo Rolly Carnando	(Malaysia) Low Hang Yee (Malaysia) Ng Eng Cheong	17–21, 21–17, 21–11	(gold) Winner	

BWF International Challenge tournament
BWF International Series tournament

=== BWF Junior International (4 titles, 1 runner-up) ===
Boys' doubles
Year	Tournament	Partner	Opponent	Score	Result	Ref.
2018	India Junior International	(Indonesia) Leo Rolly Carnando	(Indonesia) Pramudya Kusumawardana (Indonesia) Ghifari Anandaffa Prihardika	21–12, 21–14	(gold) Winner	
2018	Malaysia International Junior Open	(Indonesia) Leo Rolly Carnando	(Indonesia) Rehan Naufal Kusharjanto (Indonesia) Pramudya Kusumawardana	21–17, 21–12	(gold) Winner	
2019	German Junior International	(Indonesia) Leo Rolly Carnando	(China) Di Zijian (China) Wang Chang	17–21, 13–21	(silver) Runner-up	
2019	Jaya Raya Junior International	(Indonesia) Leo Rolly Carnando	(China) Di Zijian (China) Wang Chang	21–15, 21–14	(gold) Winner	

Mixed doubles
Year	Tournament	Partner	Opponent	Score	Result	Ref.
2019	Dutch Junior International	(Indonesia) Nita Violina Marwah	(China) Feng Yanzhe (China) Lin Fangling	21–16, 21–16	(gold) Winner	

BWF Junior International Grand Prix tournament
BWF Junior International Challenge tournament
BWF Junior International Series tournament
BWF Junior Future Series tournament

== Performance timeline ==
Key

W	Won	F	Finalist	SF	Semi-finalist
QF	Quarter-finalist	#R	Rounds 4, 3, 2, 1	RR	Round-robin stage
Q#	Qualification round	A	Absent	w/d	Withdrew
G	Gold	S	Silver	B	Bronze
NH	Not held	N/A	Not applicable	DNQ	Did not qualify

=== National team ===
- Junior level

Team events	2018	2019	Ref
Asian Junior Championships	B	S	
World Junior Championships	B	G	

- Senior level

Team events	2020	2021	2022	2023	2024	2025	2026	Ref
SEA Games	NH	B	NH	A	NH	A	NH	
Asia Team Championships	A	NH	S	NH	QF	NH	A	
Asia Mixed Team Championships	NH			A	NH	G	NH	
Asian Games	NH		QF	NH			G	
Thomas Cup	G	NH	A	NH	S	NH	A	
Sudirman Cup	NH	A	NH	QF	NH	B	NH	

=== Individual competitions ===
==== Junior level ====
Boys' doubles

Events	2018	2019	Ref
Asian Junior Championships	1R	G	
World Junior Championships	4R	G	

==== Senior level ====
===== Men's doubles =====
Events	2021	2022	2023	2024	2025	2026	Ref
SEA Games	G	NH	A	NH	A	NH	
Asian Championships	NH	A	1R	1R	QF	A	
Asian Games	NH	2R	NH			G	
World Championships	DNQ		3R	NH	DNQ		

Tournament	BWF World Tour									Best	Ref
Tournament	2018	2019	2020	2021	2022	2023	2024	2025	2026	Best	Ref
Malaysia Open	A		NH		A	2R	1R	A		2R ('23)	
India Open	A		NH		A	1R	1R	A		1R ('23, '24)	
Indonesia Masters	A			1R	2R	W	W	2R	A	W ('23, '24)	
Thailand Masters	A		2R	NH		W	2R	F	A	W ('23)	
All England Open	A				QF	QF	1R	2R	A	QF ('22, '23)	
Swiss Open	A		NH	QF	QF	1R	SF	F	A	F ('25)	
Orléans Masters	A		NH	A		SF	A			SF ('23)	
Thailand Open	A		SF	NH	A	1R	1R	A	W	W ('26)	
Thailand Open	A		2R	NH	A	1R	1R	A	W	W ('26)	
Malaysia Masters	A			NH	A	SF	A		1R	SF ('23)	
Singapore Open	A		NH		W	QF	1R	A		W ('22)	
Indonesia Open	A		NH	1R	2R	QF	2R	A	1R	QF ('23)	
Australian Open	A		NH		A	2R	A		2R	2R ('23, '26)	
Macau Open	A		NH				2R	A	2R	2R ('24, '26)	
Japan Open	A		NH		2R	1R	SF	A		SF ('24)	
China Open	A		NH			1R	SF	A		SF ('24)	
Taipei Open	A		NH		w/d	A			W	W ('26)	
Korea Masters	A		NH		1R	A	2R	A		2R ('24)	
China Masters	A		NH			QF	1R	A	2R	QF ('23)	
Indonesia Masters Super 100	Q2	A	NH		A					Q2 ('18)	
Denmark Open	A			1R	QF	1R	A		w/d	QF ('22)	
French Open	A		NH	1R	2R	2R	1R	A	SF	SF ('26)	
Hylo Open	A			F	2R	A			w/d	F ('21)	
Korea Open	A		NH		2R	1R	SF	A		SF ('24)	
Japan Masters	NH					1R	QF	A		QF ('24)	
Hong Kong Open	A		NH			F	QF	A	Q	F ('23)	
Syed Modi International	A		NH		A				Q	('26)	
Akita Masters	A	QF	NH							QF ('19)	
Spain Masters	A		1R	QF	NH	1R	A	NH		QF ('21)	
Year-end ranking	177	84	70	28	15	11	25	39		9	
Tournament	2018	2019	2020	2021	2022	2023	2024	2025	2026	Best	Ref

===== Mixed doubles =====
Tournament	BWF World Tour	Best
Tournament	2018	Best
Indonesia Masters Super 100	1R	1R ('18)
Year-end ranking	263	145
