= Wang Chang (badminton) =

Chinese badminton player (born 2001)

Wang Chang 王昶
Personal information
- Born: 7 May 2001 (age 25) Ningbo, Zhejiang, China
- Height: 1.81 m (5 ft 11 in)
- Spouse: Qian Tianyi (m. 2026)

Sport
- Country: China
- Sport: Badminton
- Handedness: Right

Men's doubles
- Highest ranking: 1 (with Liang Weikeng, 31 October 2023); 33 (with Di Zijian, 3 December 2019)
- Current ranking: 3 (with Liang Weikeng, 10 November 2026)
- BWF profile
Medal record
Men's badminton
Representing China
Olympic Games
Silver medal – second place	2024 Paris	Men's doubles
World Championships
Gold medal – first place	2026 New Delhi	Men's doubles
Bronze medal – third place	2023 Copenhagen	Men's doubles
Sudirman Cup
Gold medal – first place	2023 Suzhou	Mixed team
Gold medal – first place	2025 Xiamen	Mixed team
Thomas Cup
Gold medal – first place	2024 Chengdu	Men's team
Gold medal – first place	2026 Horsens	Men's team
Silver medal – second place	2020 Aarhus	Men's team
Asian Games
Gold medal – first place	2022 Hangzhou	Men's team
Silver medal – second place	2026 Aichi–Nagoya	Men's team
Silver medal – second place	2026 Aichi–Nagoya	Men's doubles
Asian Championships
Gold medal – first place	2024 Ningbo	Men's doubles
Bronze medal – third place	2025 Ningbo	Men's doubles
World Junior Championships
Gold medal – first place	2017 Yogyakarta	Mixed team
Gold medal – first place	2018 Markham	Boys' doubles
Gold medal – first place	2018 Markham	Mixed team
Silver medal – second place	2017 Yogyakarta	Boys' doubles
Silver medal – second place	2019 Kazan	Boys' doubles
Silver medal – second place	2019 Kazan	Mixed team
Asian Junior Championships
Gold medal – first place	2017 Jakarta	Boys' doubles
Gold medal – first place	2018 Jakarta	Boys' doubles
Gold medal – first place	2018 Jakarta	Mixed team
Silver medal – second place	2019 Suzhou	Boys' doubles
Bronze medal – third place	2019 Suzhou	Mixed team

Wang Chang (Chinese: 王昶; pinyin: Wáng Chǎng; born 7 May 2001) is a Chinese badminton player. Partnering Di Zijian, Wang won the gold medal in boys' doubles at the 2017 Asian Junior Championships and the 2018 World Junior Championships. Partnering Liang Weikeng, Wang won the bronze medal in men's doubles at the 2023 World Championships, the silver medal at the 2024 Summer Olympics, and the gold medal at the 2026 World Championships. Wang was also a part of the Chinese winning team at the 2023 and 2025 Sudirman Cup and the 2024 and 2026 Thomas Cup. He reached a career-high ranking of No. 1 in men's doubles on 31 October 2023.

== Career ==
=== 2015–2019: Early and junior career – Asian and World junior champions ===
Born in Ningbo, Zhejiang, Wang who trained in Ningbo training centre, entered the provincial team in 2015, and in the national team in 2017. After being selected to join the national team, he started his partnership with Di Zijian in the men's doubles discipline. He made a debut in the international tournament at the 2017 Asian Junior Championships, and claimed the gold medal in the boys' doubles event. He also participated at the 2017 World Junior Championships where he helped the team to take the Suhandinata Cup, and he also won the silver medal in the boys' doubles event. In 2018, he won the boys' doubles and mixed team titles at the Asia and World Junior Championships.

=== 2022 ===
Starting from 2022, Wang started a new partnership with Liang Weikeng and advanced to the final of the Indonesia Masters from the qualifying rounds, defeating Tokyo 2020 bronze medalists Aaron Chia and Soh Wooi Yik and world number 1 Marcus Fernaldi Gideon and Kevin Sanjaya Sukamuljo en route. In the final, they lost 10–21, 17–21 to home favorites Fajar Alfian and Muhammad Rian Ardianto. In the next tournament, they defeated the reigning World Champions Takuro Hoki and Yugo Kobayashi to reach the semi-finals of the Malaysia Masters, but were then stopped by Mohammad Ahsan and Hendra Setiawan in straight games. Wang then won the Japan Open, where he and Liang defeated Kim Astrup and Anders Skaarup Rasmussen in the final in three games.

=== 2023 ===
In the first half of the 2023 season, Wang and his partner Liang showed quite significant progress. They were able to win 2 BWF World Tour titles in India and Thailand, as well as being runners-up in Malaysia and Singapore. Apart from that, Wang was part of the Chinese team that won the Sudirman Cup. Wang and Liang's achievements were able to bring them to 2nd place in the BWF world rankings on 13 June 2023.

In August, Wang and Liang won the bronze medal at the World Championships in Copenhagen. They were defeated by home pair Kim Astrup and Anders Skaarup Rasmussen in a close rubber game. The Chinese rising pair then claimed their first ever BWF World Tour Super 1000 title at the China Open.

== Personal life ==
On 7 February 2026, Wang announced on Weibo that he had registered his marriage with Chinese table tennis player Qian Tianyi, sharing photos of their marriage certificates, while Qian posted a video of Wang’s proposal.

== Achievements ==
=== Olympic Games ===
Men's doubles
Year	Venue	Partner	Opponent	Score	Result	Ref.
2024	Porte de La Chapelle Arena, Paris, France	(China) Liang Weikeng	(Chinese Taipei) Lee Yang (Chinese Taipei) Wang Chi-lin	17–21, 21–18, 19–21	Silver	

=== World Championships ===
Men's doubles
Year	Venue	Partner	Opponent	Score	Result	Ref.
2023	Royal Arena, Copenhagen, Denmark	(China) Liang Weikeng	(Denmark) Kim Astrup (Denmark) Anders Skaarup Rasmussen	21–17, 18–21, 19–21	Bronze	
2026	Indira Gandhi Arena, New Delhi, India	(China) Liang Weikeng	(Malaysia) Aaron Chia (Malaysia) Soh Wooi Yik	21–17, 21–16	Gold	

=== Asian Games ===
Men's doubles
Year	Venue	Partner	Opponent	Score	Result	Ref.
2026	Ichinomiya City Municipal Gymnasium, Ichinomiya, Japan	(China) Liang Weikeng	(Indonesia) Leo Rolly Carnando (Indonesia) Daniel Marthin	21–19, 13–21, 18–21	Silver	

=== Asian Championships ===
Men's doubles
Year	Venue	Partner	Opponent	Score	Result	Ref.
2024	Ningbo Olympic Sports Center Gymnasium, Ningbo, China	(China) Liang Weikeng	(Malaysia) Goh Sze Fei (Malaysia) Nur Izzuddin	21–17, 15–21, 21–10	Gold	
2025	Ningbo Olympic Sports Center Gymnasium, Ningbo, China	(China) Liang Weikeng	(Malaysia) Aaron Chia (Malaysia) Soh Wooi Yik	12–21, 14–21	Bronze	

=== World Junior Championships ===
Boys' doubles
Year	Venue	Partner	Opponent	Score	Result	Ref.
2017	GOR Among Rogo; Yogyakarta, Indonesia	(China) Di Zijian	(Japan) Mahiro Kaneko (Japan) Yunosuke Kubota	14–21, 21–15, 13–21	Silver	
2018	Markham Pan Am Centre; Markham, Canada	(China) Di Zijian	(South Korea) Shin Tae-yang (South Korea) Wang Chan	21–19, 22–20	Gold	
2019	Kazan Gymnastics Center; Kazan, Russia	(China) Di Zijian	(Indonesia) Leo Rolly Carnando (Indonesia) Daniel Marthin	19–21, 18–21	Silver	

=== Asian Junior Championships ===
Boys' doubles
Year	Venue	Partner	Opponent	Score	Result	Ref.
2017	Jaya Raya Sports Hall Training Center; Jakarta, Indonesia	(China) Di Zijian	(South Korea) Lee Sang-min (South Korea) Na Sung-seung	21–19, 21–11	Gold	
2018	Jaya Raya Sports Hall Training Center; Jakarta, Indonesia	(China) Di Zijian	(China) Liang Weikeng (China) Shang Yichen	18–21, 24–22, 21–19	Gold	
2019	Suzhou Olympic Sports Centre; Suzhou, China	(China) Di Zijian	(Indonesia) Leo Rolly Carnando (Indonesia) Daniel Marthin	9–21, 21–15, 19–21	Silver	

=== BWF World Tour (11 titles, 7 runners-up) ===
The BWF World Tour, which was announced on 19 March 2017 and implemented in 2018, is a series of elite badminton tournaments sanctioned by the Badminton World Federation (BWF). The BWF World Tours are divided into levels of World Tour Finals, Super 1000, Super 750, Super 500, Super 300, and the BWF Tour Super 100.

Men's doubles
Year	Tournament	Level	Partner	Opponent	Score	Result	Ref.
2018	Lingshui China Masters	Super 100	(China) Di Zijian	(China) Han Chengkai (China) Zhou Haodong	21–19, 17–21, 16–21	(silver) Runner-up	
2019	SaarLorLux Open	Super 100	(China) Di Zijian	(Denmark) Mathias Bay-Smidt (Denmark) Lasse Mølhede	21–17, 21–15	(gold) Winner	
2022	Indonesia Masters	Super 500	(China) Liang Weikeng	(Indonesia) Fajar Alfian (Indonesia) Muhammad Rian Ardianto	10–21, 17–21	(silver) Runner-up	
2022	Japan Open	Super 750	(China) Liang Weikeng	(Denmark) Kim Astrup (Denmark) Anders Skaarup Rasmussen	21–18, 13–21, 21–17	(gold) Winner	
2023	Malaysia Open	Super 1000	(China) Liang Weikeng	(Indonesia) Fajar Alfian (Indonesia) Muhammad Rian Ardianto	18–21, 21–18, 13–21	(silver) Runner-up	
2023	India Open	Super 750	(China) Liang Weikeng	(Malaysia) Aaron Chia (Malaysia) Soh Wooi Yik	14–21, 21–19, 21–18	(gold) Winner	
2023	Thailand Open	Super 500	(China) Liang Weikeng	(Indonesia) Muhammad Shohibul Fikri (Indonesia) Bagas Maulana	21–10, 21–15	(gold) Winner	
2023	Singapore Open	Super 750	(China) Liang Weikeng	(Japan) Takuro Hoki (Japan) Yugo Kobayashi	13–21, 18–21	(silver) Runner-up	
2023	China Open	Super 1000	(China) Liang Weikeng	(Malaysia) Aaron Chia (Malaysia) Soh Wooi Yik	21–12, 21–14	(gold) Winner	
2023	China Masters	Super 750	(China) Liang Weikeng	(India) Satwiksairaj Rankireddy (India) Chirag Shetty	21–19, 18–21, 21–19	(gold) Winner	
2023	BWF World Tour Finals	World Tour Finals	(China) Liang Weikeng	(South Korea) Kang Min-hyuk (South Korea) Seo Seung-jae	17–21, 20–22	(silver) Runner-up	
2024	Malaysia Open	Super 1000	(China) Liang Weikeng	(India) Satwiksairaj Rankireddy (India) Chirag Shetty	9–21, 21–18, 21–17	(gold) Winner	
2024	Indonesia Open	Super 1000	(China) Liang Weikeng	(Malaysia) Man Wei Chong (Malaysia) Tee Kai Wun	19–21, 21–16, 21–12	(gold) Winner	
2024	Denmark Open	Super 750	(China) Liang Weikeng	(Denmark) Kim Astrup (Denmark) Anders Skaarup Rasmussen	21–18, 21–17	(gold) Winner	
2025	Orléans Masters	Super 300	(China) Liang Weikeng	(South Korea) Kang Min-hyuk (South Korea) Ki Dong-ju	13–21, 21–18, 18–21	(silver) Runner-up	
2025	Hong Kong Open	Super 500	(China) Liang Weikeng	(India) Satwiksairaj Rankireddy (India) Chirag Shetty	19–21, 21–14, 21–17	(gold) Winner	
2025	BWF World Tour Finals	World Tour Finals	(China) Liang Weikeng	(South Korea) Kim Won-ho (South Korea) Seo Seung-jae	18–21, 14–21	(silver) Runner-up	
2026	India Open	Super 750	(China) Liang Weikeng	(Japan) Hiroki Midorikawa (Japan) Kyohei Yamashita	17–21, 25–23, 21–16	(gold) Winner	

== Performance timeline ==
Key

W	Won	F	Finalist	SF	Semi-finalist
QF	Quarter-finalist	#R	Rounds 4, 3, 2, 1	RR	Round-robin stage
Q#	Qualification round	A	Absent	w/d	Withdrew
G	Gold	S	Silver	B	Bronze
NH	Not held	N/A	Not applicable	DNQ	Did not qualify

=== National team ===
- Junior level

Team events	2017	2018	2019	Ref
Asian Junior Championships	QF	G	B	
World Junior Championships	G	G	S	

- Senior level

Team events	2020	2021	2022	2023	2024	2025	2026	Ref
Asian Games	NH		G	NH			S	
Thomas Cup	S	NH	A	NH	G	NH	G	
Sudirman Cup	NH	A	NH	G	NH	G	NH	

=== Individual competitions ===
==== Junior level ====
- Boys' doubles

Events	2017	2018	2019	Ref
Asian Junior Championships	G	G	S	
World Junior Championships	S	G	S	

- Mixed doubles

Event	2017
Asian Junior Championships	2R

==== Senior level ====
- Men's doubles

Tournaments	2021	2022	2023	2024	2025	2026	Ref
Asian Championships	NH	A	QF	G	B	QF	
Asian Games	NH	2R	NH			S	
World Championships	1R	A	B	NH	3R	G	
Olympic Games	NH			S	NH		

Tournament	BWF SS / GP	BWF World Tour									Best	Ref
Tournament	2017	2018	2019	2020	2021	2022	2023	2024	2025	2026	Best	Ref
Malaysia Open	A			NH		A	F	W	2R	1R	W ('24)	
India Open	A			NH		A	W	2R	QF	W	W ('23, '26)	
Indonesia Masters	NH	A		2R	A	F	2R	A			F ('22)	
Thailand Masters	A		QF	1R	NH		A				QF ('19)	
German Open	A			NH		A	1R	A		SF	SF ('26)	
All England Open	A			1R	A		SF	2R	1R	QF	SF ('23)	
Lingshui China Masters	NH	F	SF	NH			A				F ('18)	
Swiss Open	A			NH	A				QF	A	QF ('25)	
Orléans Masters	NA	A		NH	A				F	A	F ('25)	
Thailand Open	A		Q1	A	NH	2R	W	A			W ('23')	
Malaysia Masters	A		1R	1R	NH	SF	A		QF	A	SF ('22)	
Singapore Open	A			NH		2R	F	QF	QF	SF	F ('23)	
Indonesia Open	A		1R	NH	A		QF	W	2R	1R	W ('24)	
Australian Open	A			NH		QF	A			SF	SF ('26)	
Macau Open	1R	A		NH				A			1R ('17)	
U.S. Open	A	2R	A	NH			A				2R ('18)	
Canada Open	A	SF	A	NH		A					SF ('18)	
Japan Open	A			NH		W	2R	w/d	QF	QF	W ('22)	
China Open	Q2	A	1R	NH			W	2R	SF	SF	W ('23)	
Korea Masters	Q1	A	QF	NH		A					QF (19)	
China Masters	A			NH			W	2R	2R	w/d	W ('23)	
Vietnam Open	A		QF	NH		A					QF (19)	
Denmark Open	A		1R	A	1R	1R	1R	W	SF	SF	W ('24)	
French Open	A		1R	NH	A	QF	2R	2R	1R	1R	QF ('22)	
Hylo Open	A		W	A		QF	A				W ('19)	
Korea Open	A			NH		A	SF	A	1R	QF	SF ('23)	
Japan Masters	NH						A			SF	SF ('26)	
Hong Kong Open	A			NH			A		W	QF	W ('25)	
Syed Modi International	A		SF	NH		A					SF ('19)	
Superseries / Tour Finals	DNQ						F	DNQ	F		F ('23, '25)	
Year-end ranking	367	116	33	35	41	17	1	2	4		1	
Tournament	2017	2018	2019	2020	2021	2022	2023	2024	2025	2026	Best	Ref

- Mixed doubles

Tournament	BWF SS / GP
Tournament	2017
Korea Masters	Q2
