= Leo Rolly Carnando =

Indonesian badminton player (born 2001)

Personal information
- Born: 29 July 2001 (age 25) Klaten, Central Java, Indonesia
- Height: 1.71 m (5 ft 7 in)
- Spouse: Indah Cahya Sari Jamil (m. 2026)

Sport
- Country: Indonesia
- Sport: Badminton
- Handedness: Right

Men's & mixed doubles
- Highest ranking: 9 (MD with Daniel Marthin, 23 May 2023); 9 (MD with Bagas Maulana, 15 April 2025); 175 (XD with Indah Cahya Sari Jamil, 12 March 2019)
- Current ranking: 18 (MD with Daniel Marthin, 17 November 2026)
- BWF profile
Medal record
Men's badminton
Representing Indonesia
Thomas Cup
Gold medal – first place	2020 Aarhus	Men's team
Silver medal – second place	2024 Chengdu	Men's team
Asian Games
Gold medal – first place	2026 Aichi–Nagoya	Men's team
Gold medal – first place	2026 Aichi–Nagoya	Men's doubles
Asian Championships
Bronze medal – third place	2025 Ningbo	Men's doubles
Asia Team Championships
Silver medal – second place	2022 Selangor	Men's team
Bronze medal – third place	2026 Qingdao	Men's team
SEA Games
Gold medal – first place	2021 Vietnam	Men's doubles
Gold medal – first place	2025 Thailand	Men's team
Bronze medal – third place	2021 Vietnam	Men's team
Bronze medal – third place	2025 Thailand	Men's doubles
World Junior Championships
Gold medal – first place	2018 Markham	Mixed doubles
Gold medal – first place	2019 Kazan	Boys' doubles
Gold medal – first place	2019 Kazan	Mixed team
Silver medal – second place	2019 Kazan	Mixed doubles
Bronze medal – third place	2018 Markham	Mixed team
Asian Junior Championships
Gold medal – first place	2019 Suzhou	Boys' doubles
Gold medal – first place	2019 Suzhou	Mixed doubles
Silver medal – second place	2019 Suzhou	Mixed team
Bronze medal – third place	2018 Jakarta	Mixed team

Leo Rolly Carnando (born 29 July 2001) is an Indonesian badminton player affiliated with Djarum club. He was a World Junior Champions in the mixed doubles in 2018 and in the boys' doubles in 2019, also won double gold at the 2019 Asian Junior Championships in the boys' and mixed doubles events. Carnando was part of Indonesia winning team at the 2020 Thomas Cup and 2026 Asian Games.

== Career ==
Carnando was selected to join the Djarum club in 2015. He has focused on playing in the doubles category. In 2016, he won the boys' doubles titles at the USM Flypower Open, Astec Open Badminton Championships and Singapore Youth International Series. He also won the mixed doubles title at the Walikota Surabaya Open, National circuit in Lampung and West Java. In 2017, he clinched double title by winning the U17 boys' and mixed doubles events at the Jaya Raya Indonesia Junior International, then won the boys' doubles title at the Walikota Surabaya Bank Jatim Victor Open, National circuit in North Sulawesi, and also the mixed doubles title at the National circuit in Central Java.

Carnando was selected to join the Indonesia National training center in 2018. He alongside Indonesia team won the bronze medal at the Asian Junior Championships in Jakarta. Unfortunately, in the individual events, he was defeated in the early stage. Carnando claimed his first title in the BWF sanctioned tournament at the India Junior International, where he and Daniel Marthin beat their compatriot Pramudya Kusumawardana and Ghifari Anandaffa Prihardika in the final. A week later, the duo won the Malaysia International Junior Open. In November, he won the gold medal in the mixed doubles with partner Indah Cahya Sari Jamil at the Markham World Junior Championships. It was a surprise, because they entered the tournament as an unseeded pair, having only paired a few months earlier. While in the team event, he helped Indonesia win the bronze medal. Carnando claimed his first senior International title by winning the Bangladesh International in both mixed and men's doubles. He then reached two finals in the Turkey International, and won a title in the men's doubles. For his achievements in 2018, Carnado was nominated as Eddy Choong Most Promising Player of the Year with Marthin, and was named Djarum Outstanding Young Athlete with Jamil.

In March 2019, Carnando finished as runner-up in the boys' doubles with Daniel Marthin in the German Junior. In May, he clinched two titles at the Jaya Raya Junior Grand Prix, winning the boys' doubles with Marthin, and in the mixed doubles with Indah Cahya Sari Jamil. In June, he and Marthin also won the Malaysia International Series. At the Asian Junior Championships, Carnando took two gold medals. He topped the podium in the boys' doubles with Marthin, and in the mixed doubles with Jamil. Carnando and Marthin then won the Kazan World Junior Championships beating top seeds Di Zijian and Wang Chang. However, he was unable to defend his mixed doubles title with Jamil. In the team event, he also helped the National team finish as runner-up in Asian Junior and win the Suhandinata Cup by defeating China in the mixed team final of World Junior Championships.

Entering the senior level, Carnando focused on only playing in the men's doubles. He started the year as semi-finalists at the Thailand Open with Daniel Marthin. They later stopped in the quarter-finals at the Swiss Open and Spain Masters. They then reached the finals of the Hylo Open, but was defeated by World number 1 Marcus Fernaldi Gideon and Kevin Sanjaya Sukamuljo in straight game. Carnanado made his debut with Indonesia team at the 2020 Thomas Cup, which is Indonesia won the Thomas Cup after 19 years.

In February 2022, Carnando participated in 2022 Badminton Asia Team Championships with Indonesia and lost the title to Malaysia. In March, Marthin and Carnando lost in the quarter-finals in the All England and Swiss Opens. In May, he took part at the SEA Games, and won a gold medal in the men's doubles with Marthin and a bronze medal in the men's team event. In July, Carnando and Marthin clinched their first World Tour title at the Singapore Open by beating Fajar Alfian and Muhammad Rian Ardianto in the final.

=== 2023 ===
Carnando entered the 2023 season with less than satisfactory results, where he and his partner Marthin, had to lose in the early rounds at the Malaysia and India Opens. Carnando and Marthin then emerged victorious in the Indonesia and Thailand Masters, entering them to the top 10 of the BWF world rankings. At the Europe tour in March–April, Carnando and Marthin reached the semi-finals in the Orléans Masters in France, quarter-finals in the All England Open, and had to accept first round defeats in two tournaments of Swiss Open and Spain Masters. They again tasted defeat in the early rounds in the Asian Championships in Dubai from 2nd seed Aaron Chia and Soh Wooi Yik. In May, Carnando alongside the Indonesian team competed at the Sudirman Cup in Suzhou, China. He played a match in the group stage, lost against Mark Lamsfuß and Marvin Seidel of Germany. Indonesia advanced to the knockout stage but lost in the quarter-finals against China.

The performance of Carnando and Marthin are still inconsistent. Their journey has experienced ups and downs in the world's top-level competition. In the Malaysia Masters, they reached the semi-finals, while in the Singapore and Indonesia Opens they were stopped in the quarter-finals. A number of defeats in the early rounds occurred in the Thailand, Korea, Japan, and Australian Opens, as well at the World Championships. They later reached the finals at the Hong Kong, but were unable to produce a satisfactory result after losing the finals to Kim Astrup and Anders Skaarup Rasmussen. Carnando made his debut at the Asian Games in Hangzhou, but unable to win any medals in both the men's doubles and team events.

=== 2025 ===
Started the 2025 season in the Indonesia Masters, Carnando and Maulana were defeated in the first round. They then reached the quarter-finals in the Thailand Masters and also the semi-finals in the All England Open both losing to Seo Seung-jae with different partner. Carnando then captured his first medal at the Asian Championships by winning the bronze in the men's doubles with Maulana. In December, he made his second appearance at the SEA Games, helps to win the gold medal in the team event, and captured the bronze medal in the men's doubles with Maulana.

== Awards and nominations ==
Award	Year	Category	Result	Ref.
BWF Awards	2019	Eddy Choong Most Promising Player of the Year with Daniel Marthin	Nominated	
Gatra Awards	2021	Sports Category with 2020 Thomas Cup squad	Won	

== Achievements ==
=== Asian Games ===
Men's doubles
Year	Venue	Partner	Opponent	Score	Result	Ref.
2026	Ichinomiya City Municipal Gymnasium, Ichinomiya, Japan	(Indonesia) Daniel Marthin	(China) Liang Weikeng (China) Wang Chang	19–21, 21–13, 21–18	Gold	

=== Asian Championships ===
Men's doubles
Year	Venue	Partner	Opponent	Score	Result	Ref.
2025	Ningbo Olympic Sports Center Gymnasium, Ningbo, China	(Indonesia) Bagas Maulana	(China) Chen Boyang (China) Liu Yi	21–13, 18–21, 12–21	Bronze	

=== SEA Games ===
Men's doubles
Year	Venue	Partner	Opponent	Score	Result	Ref.
2021	Bac Giang Gymnasium, Bắc Giang, Vietnam	(Indonesia) Daniel Marthin	(Indonesia) Pramudya Kusumawardana (Indonesia) Yeremia Rambitan	21–17, 21–19	Gold	
2025	Gymnasium 4 Thammasat University Rangsit Campus, Pathum Thani, Thailand	(Indonesia) Bagas Maulana	(Malaysia) Aaron Chia (Malaysia) Soh Wooi Yik	16–21, 17–21	Bronze	

=== World Junior Championships ===
Boys' doubles
Year	Venue	Partner	Opponent	Score	Result	Ref.
2019	Kazan Gymnastics Center, Kazan, Russia	(Indonesia) Daniel Marthin	(China) Di Zijian (China) Wang Chang	21–19, 21–18	Gold	

Mixed doubles
Year	Venue	Partner	Opponent	Score	Result	Ref.
2018	Markham Pan Am Centre, Markham, Canada	(Indonesia) Indah Cahya Sari Jamil	(Indonesia) Rehan Naufal Kusharjanto (Indonesia) Siti Fadia Silva Ramadhanti	21–15, 21–9	Gold	
2019	Kazan Gymnastics Center, Kazan, Russia	(Indonesia) Indah Cahya Sari Jamil	(China) Feng Yanzhe (China) Lin Fangling	17–21, 17–21	Silver	

=== Asian Junior Championships ===
Boys' doubles
Year	Venue	Partner	Opponent	Score	Result	Ref.
2019	Suzhou Olympic Sports Centre, Suzhou, China	(Indonesia) Daniel Marthin	(China) Di Zijian (China) Wang Chang	21–9, 15–21, 21–19	Gold	

Mixed doubles
Year	Venue	Partner	Opponent	Score	Result	Ref.
2019	Suzhou Olympic Sports Centre, Suzhou, China	(Indonesia) Indah Cahya Sari Jamil	(China) Feng Yanzhe (China) Lin Fangling	16–21, 22–20, 22–20	Gold	

=== BWF World Tour (8 titles, 4 runners-up) ===
The BWF World Tour, which was announced on 19 March 2017 and implemented in 2018, is a series of elite badminton tournaments sanctioned by the Badminton World Federation (BWF). The BWF World Tour is divided into levels of World Tour Finals, Super 1000, Super 750, Super 500, Super 300, and the BWF Tour Super 100.

Men's doubles
Year	Tournament	Level	Partner	Opponent	Score	Result	Ref.
2021	Hylo Open	Super 500	(Indonesia) Daniel Marthin	(Indonesia) Marcus Fernaldi Gideon (Indonesia) Kevin Sanjaya Sukamuljo	14–21, 19–21	(silver) Runner-up	
2022	Singapore Open	Super 500	(Indonesia) Daniel Marthin	(Indonesia) Fajar Alfian (Indonesia) Muhammad Rian Ardianto	9–21, 21–14, 21–16	(gold) Winner	
2023	Indonesia Masters	Super 500	(Indonesia) Daniel Marthin	(China) He Jiting (China) Zhou Haodong	21–17, 21–16	(gold) Winner	
2023	Thailand Masters	Super 300	(Indonesia) Daniel Marthin	(Chinese Taipei) Su Ching-heng (Chinese Taipei) Ye Hong-wei	21–16, 21–17	(gold) Winner	
2023	Hong Kong Open	Super 500	(Indonesia) Daniel Marthin	(Denmark) Kim Astrup (Denmark) Anders Skaarup Rasmussen	10–21, 24–22, 19–21	(silver) Runner-up	
2024	Indonesia Masters	Super 500	(Indonesia) Daniel Marthin	(Denmark) Kim Astrup (Denmark) Anders Skaarup Rasmussen	21–12, 20–22, 21–11	(gold) Winner	
2024	Korea Open	Super 500	(Indonesia) Bagas Maulana	(South Korea) Kang Min-hyuk (South Korea) Seo Seung-jae	18–21, 21–9, 21–8	(gold) Winner	
2025	All England Open	Super 1000	(Indonesia) Bagas Maulana	(South Korea) Kim Won-ho (South Korea) Seo Seung-jae	19–21, 19–21	(silver) Runner-up	
2026	Thailand Masters	Super 300	(Indonesia) Bagas Maulana	(Indonesia) Raymond Indra (Indonesia) Nikolaus Joaquin	21–10, 21–17	(gold) Winner	
2026	Thailand Open	Super 500	(Indonesia) Daniel Marthin	(India) Satwiksairaj Rankireddy (India) Chirag Shetty	21–12, 25–23	(gold) Winner	
2026	Taipei Open	Super 300	(Indonesia) Daniel Marthin	(Malaysia) Aaron Chia (Malaysia) Aaron Tai	23–21, 21–19	(gold) Winner	
2026	Hong Kong Open	Super 500	(Indonesia) Daniel Marthin	(Malaysia) Man Wei Chong (Malaysia) Tee Kai Wun	19–21, 18–21	(silver) Runner-up	

=== BWF International Challenge/Series (4 titles, 1 runner-up) ===
Men's doubles
Year	Tournament	Partner	Opponent	Score	Result	Ref.
2018	Bangladesh International	(Indonesia) Daniel Marthin	(Thailand) Supak Jomkoh (Thailand) Wachirawit Sothon	21–16, 21–11	(gold) Winner	
2018	Turkey International	(Indonesia) Daniel Marthin	(England) Peter Briggs (England) Gregory Mairs	21–14, 13–21, 23–21	(gold) Winner	
2019	Malaysia International	(Indonesia) Daniel Marthin	(Malaysia) Low Hang Yee (Malaysia) Ng Eng Cheong	17–21, 21–17, 21–11	(gold) Winner	

Mixed doubles
Year	Tournament	Partner	Opponent	Score	Result	Ref.
2018	Bangladesh International	(Indonesia) Indah Cahya Sari Jamil	(Malaysia) Hoo Pang Ron (Malaysia) Cheah Yee See	21–16, 21–15	(gold) Winner	
2018	Turkey International	(Indonesia) Indah Cahya Sari Jamil	(Singapore) Danny Bawa Chrisnanta (Singapore) Tan Wei Han	19–21, 21–16, 12–21	(silver) Runner-up	

BWF International Challenge tournament
BWF International Series tournament

=== BWF Junior International (4 titles, 2 runners-up) ===
Boys' doubles
Year	Tournament	Partner	Opponent	Score	Result	Ref.
2018	India Junior International	(Indonesia) Daniel Marthin	(Indonesia) Pramudya Kusumawardana (Indonesia) Ghifari Anandaffa Prihardika	21–12, 21–14	(gold) Winner	
2018	Malaysia International Junior Open	(Indonesia) Daniel Marthin	(Indonesia) Rehan Naufal Kusharjanto (Indonesia) Pramudya Kusumawardana	21–17, 21–12	(gold) Winner	
2019	German Junior International	(Indonesia) Daniel Marthin	(China) Di Zijian (China) Wang Chang	17–21, 13–21	(silver) Runner-up	
2019	Jaya Raya Junior International	(Indonesia) Daniel Marthin	(China) Di Zijian (China) Wang Chang	21–15, 21–14	(gold) Winner	

Mixed doubles
Year	Tournament	Partner	Opponent	Score	Result	Ref.
2018	India Junior International	(Indonesia) Metya Inayah Cindiani	(Indonesia) Pramudya Kusumawardana (Indonesia) Ribka Sugiarto	16–21, 12–21	(silver) Runner-up	
2019	Jaya Raya Junior International	(Indonesia) Indah Cahya Sari Jamil	(China) Feng Yanzhe (China) Lin Fangling	21–14, 21–19	(gold) Winner	

BWF Junior International Grand Prix tournament
BWF Junior International Challenge tournament
BWF Junior International Series tournament
BWF Junior Future Series tournament

== Performance timeline ==
Key

W	Won	F	Finalist	SF	Semi-finalist
QF	Quarter-finalist	#R	Rounds 4, 3, 2, 1	RR	Round-robin stage
Q#	Qualification round	A	Absent	w/d	Withdrew
G	Gold	S	Silver	B	Bronze
NH	Not held	N/A	Not applicable	DNQ	Did not qualify

=== National team ===
- Junior level

Team events	2018	2019	Ref
Asian Junior Championships	B	S	
World Junior Championships	B	G	

- Senior level

Team events	2020	2021	2022	2023	2024	2025	2026	Ref
SEA Games	NH	B	NH	A	NH	G	NH	
Asia Team Championships	A	NH	S	NH	QF	NH	B	
Asian Games	NH		QF	NH			G	
Thomas Cup	G	NH	A	NH	S	NH	A	
Sudirman Cup	NH	A	NH	QF	NH	A	NH	

=== Individual competitions ===
==== Junior level ====
Boys' doubles

Events	2018	2019	Ref
Asian Junior Championships	1R	G	
World Junior Championships	4R	G	

Mixed doubles

Events	2018	2019	Ref
Asian Junior Championships	1R	G	
World Junior Championships	G	S	

==== Senior level ====
Men's doubles

Events	2021	2022	2023	2024	2025	2026	Ref
SEA Games	G	NH	A	NH	B	NH	
Asian Championships	NH	A	1R	1R	B	A	
Asian Games	NH	2R	NH			G	
World Championships	DNQ		3R	NH	3R	Decl.	

Tournament	BWF World Tour									Best	Ref
Tournament	2018	2019	2020	2021	2022	2023	2024	2025	2026	Best	Ref
Malaysia Open	A		NH		A	2R	1R	A		2R ('23)	
India Open	A		NH		A	1R	1R	A		1R ('23, '24)	
Indonesia Masters	A			1R	2R	W	W	1R	2R	W ('23, '24)	
Thailand Masters	A		2R	NH		W	2R	QF	W	W ('23, '26)	
All England Open	A				QF	QF	1R	F	1R	F ('25)	
Swiss Open	A		NH	QF	QF	1R	SF	2R	2R	SF ('23)	
Orléans Masters	A		NH	A		SF	A		SF	SF ('23, '26)	
Thailand Open	A		SF	NH	A	1R	1R	A	W	W ('26)	
Thailand Open	A		2R	NH	A	1R	1R	A	W	W ('26)	
Malaysia Masters	A			NH	A	SF	A		1R	SF ('23)	
Singapore Open	A		NH		W	QF	1R	1R	A	W ('22)	
Indonesia Open	A		NH	1R	2R	QF	2R	1R	1R	QF ('23)	
Australian Open	A		NH		A	2R	A		2R	2R ('23, '26)	
Macau Open	A		NH				A		2R	2R ('26)	
Japan Open	A		NH		2R	1R	SF	1R	A	SF ('24)	
China Open	A		NH			1R	2R	2R	A	2R ('24, '25)	
Taipei Open	A		NH		w/d	A			W	W ('26)	
Korea Masters	A		NH		1R	A				1R ('22)	
China Masters	A		NH			QF	1R	QF	2R	QF ('23, '25)	
Indonesia Masters Super 100	Q2	A	NH		A					Q2 ('18)	
Arctic Open	NA		NH			A	1R	A		1R ('24)	
Denmark Open	A			1R	QF	1R	2R	1R	w/d	QF ('22)	
French Open	A		NH	1R	2R	2R	1R	1R	SF	SF ('26)	
Hylo Open	A			F	2R	A		2R	w/d	F ('21)	
Korea Open	A		NH		2R	1R	W	1R	A	W ('24)	
Japan Masters	NH					1R	SF	A		SF ('24)	
Hong Kong Open	A		NH			F	SF	2R	Q	F ('23)	
Syed Modi International	A		NH		A				Q	('26)	
Akita Masters	A	QF	NH							QF ('19)	
Spain Masters	A		1R	QF	NH	1R	A	NH		QF ('21)	
Year-end ranking	177	84	70	28	15	11	22	19		9	
Tournament	2018	2019	2020	2021	2022	2023	2024	2025	2026	Best	Ref
