= Jivan Acharya =

Nepalese politician

- जिवन आचार्य

Member of the Koshi Provincial Assembly
- Incumbent
- Assumed office 26 December 2022
- Preceded by: Chum Narayan Tabadar
- Constituency: Morang 6 (A)

Personal details
- Born: 26 February 1986 (age 40) Nepal
- Party: Communist Party of Nepal (Maoist Centre)

Jivan Acharya (Nepali: जिवन आचार्य) is a Nepalese politician and member of the CPN (Maoist Centre) party. He is also serving as a member of the Koshi Provincial Assembly. In the 2022 Nepalese provincial election, he won the election from Morang 6 (A) constituency.

Acharya had previously served as the Minister for Economic Affairs and Planning and also Minister for Tourism, Forests and Environment in the Government of Koshi Province.

His private residence in Biratnagar was torched by protesters during the 2025 Nepalese Gen Z protests.
