= Badminton at the 2026 Asian Games – Men's doubles =

Men's Doubles at the 2026 Asian Games
- Venue: Ichinomiya City Municipal Gymnasium, Japan
- Dates: 25–29 September 2026
- Competitors: 31 pairs from 19 nations

Medalists
gold medal	Leo Rolly Carnando; Daniel Marthin	Indonesia
silver medal	Liang Weikeng; Wang Chang	China
bronze medal	Kim Won-ho; Seo Seung-jae	South Korea
bronze medal	Fajar Alfian; Muhammad Shohibul Fikri	Indonesia

The men's doubles badminton tournament at the 2026 Asian Games will be held from 25 to 29 September 2026 at the Ichinomiya City Municipal Gymnasium in Ichinomiya, Japan. Satwiksairaj Rankireddy and Chirag Shetty of India are the defending champions, but were eliminated in the first round.

== Schedule ==
All times are Japanese Standard Time (UTC+09:00)

Date	Day	Time	Event
25 September	Friday	15:00	Round of 32
26 September	Saturday	15:00	Round of 16
27 September	Sunday	09:30	Quarter-finals
28 September	Monday	09:30	Semifinals
29 September	Tuesday	11:00	Gold medal match

== Seeds ==
The top four Asian pairs were seeded based on the BWF World Rankings published on 25 August 2026.

1. Kim Won-ho / Seo Seung-jae (KOR) (semi-finals)
2. Fajar Alfian / Muhammad Shohibul Fikri (INA) (semi-finals)
3. Liang Weikeng / Wang Chang (CHN) (final)
4. Satwiksairaj Rankireddy / Chirag Shetty (IND) (first round)

== Results ==
=== Elimination Round ===
==== Section 1 ====
Round of 32
A Chia (MAS); Tee K W (MAS)	21	21
O Abdurakhimov (TJK); D Saidov (TJK)	6	6
Lee J-h (TPE); Yang P-h (TPE)	21	21
He JT (CHN); Liu Y (CHN)	15	19
Hung K C (HKG); Lui C W (HKG)	19	21	12
K Kumagai (JPN); H Nishi (JPN)	21	19	21

Round of 16
1	Kim W-h (KOR); Seo S-j (KOR)	21	21
A Chia (MAS); Tee K W (MAS)	19	16
Lee J-h (TPE); Yang P-h (TPE)	22	17	12
K Kumagai (JPN); H Nishi (JPN)	20	21	21

Quarter-finals
1	Kim W-h (KOR); Seo S-j (KOR)	15	21	21
K Kumagai (JPN); H Nishi (JPN)	21	17	15

==== Section 2 ====
Round of 32
4	S Rankireddy (IND); C Shetty (IND)	21	19	14
P Sukphun (THA); Pak Teeraratsakul (THA)	12	21	21
Leong I C (MAC); Vong K W (MAC)	8	9
L R Carnando (INA); D Marthin (INA)	21	21
D Khishigchuluun (MGL); U Uulensolongo (MGL)	3	8
Nguyễn Đ H (VIE); Trần Đ M (VIE)	21	21
K Kulmatov (KAZ); A Niyazov (KAZ)	8	12
A I Jaman (BAN); G Singha (BAN)	21	21

Round of 16
P Sukphun (THA); Pak Teeraratsakul (THA)	8	22
L R Carnando (INA); D Marthin (INA)	21	24
Nguyễn Đ H (VIE); Trần Đ M (VIE)	21	21
A I Jaman (BAN); G Singha (BAN)	6	11

Quarter-finals
L R Carnando (INA); D Marthin (INA)	21	21
Nguyễn Đ H (VIE); Trần Đ M (VIE)	6	10

==== Section 3 ====
Round of 32
Goh S F (MAS); N Izzuddin (MAS)	21	21
Chiu H-c (TPE); Wang C-l (TPE)	17	14
A-A Jumar (BAN); M Ohidul (BAN)	9	11
T Hoki (JPN); Y Kobayashi (JPN)	21	21
N Luangamath (LAO); P Sokthavy (LAO)	16	5
C Charoenkitamorn (THA); W Thongsa-nga (THA)	21	21
B Bayarsaikhan (MGL); B Odbayar (MGL)	5	13
3	Liang WK (CHN); Wang C (CHN)	21	21

Round of 16
Goh S F (MAS); N Izzuddin (MAS)	21	21
T Hoki (JPN); Y Kobayashi (JPN)	19	16
C Charoenkitamorn (THA); W Thongsa-nga (THA)	15	14
3	Liang WK (CHN); Wang C (CHN)	21	21

Quarter-finals
Goh S F (MAS); N Izzuddin (MAS)	13	17
3	Liang WK (CHN); Wang C (CHN)	21	21

==== Section 4 ====
Round of 32
Kang M-h (KOR); Ki D-j (KOR)	21	21
A Nibal (MDV); H Shaheed (MDV)	3	6
K Khanal (NEP); P Maharjan (NEP)	13	16
W Koh (SGP); J Kubo (SGP)	21	21
Pui C C (MAC); Pui P F (MAC)	12	14
Cheung S S (HKG); Deng C F (HKG)	21	21
H Amsakarunan (IND); Arjun M. R. (IND)	14	11
2	F Alfian (INA); M S Fikri (INA)	21	21

Round of 16
Kang M-h (KOR); Ki D-j (KOR)	21	21
W Koh (SGP); J Kubo (SGP)	14	12
Cheung S S (HKG); Deng C F (HKG)	10	17
2	F Alfian (INA); M S Fikri (INA)	21	21

Quarter-finals
Kang M-h (KOR); Ki D-j (KOR)	14	22	14
2	F Alfian (INA); M S Fikri (INA)	21	20	21

=== Finals ===
Semi-finals
1	Kim Won-ho (KOR); Seo Seung-jae (KOR)	11	14
Leo Rolly Carnando (INA); Daniel Marthin (INA)	21	21
3	Liang Weikeng (CHN); Wang Chang (CHN)	21	13	21
2	Fajar Alfian (INA); Muhammad Shohibul Fikri (INA)	17	21	9

Gold medal match
Leo Rolly Carnando (INA); Daniel Marthin (INA)	19	21	21
3	Liang Weikeng (CHN); Wang Chang (CHN)	21	13	18
