= Supak Jomkoh =

Thai badminton player (born 1996)

Supak Jomkoh สุภัค จอมเกาะ
Personal information
- Born: 4 September 1996 (age 30) Nakhon Ratchasima, Thailand
- Height: 1.80 m (5 ft 11 in)

Sport
- Country: Thailand
- Sport: Badminton
- Coached by: Tesana Panvisvas

Men's & mixed doubles
- Highest ranking: 16 (MD with Kittinupong Kedren, 3 September 2024); 10 (XD with Supissara Paewsampran, 20 December 2022)
- Current ranking: 46 (XD with Ornnicha Jongsathapornparn, 27 October 2026)
- BWF profile
Medal record
Men's badminton
Representing Thailand
Asia Mixed Team Championships
| Bronze medal – third place | 2025 Qingdao | Mixed team |
SEA Games
| Bronze medal – third place | 2025 Thailand | Men's team |
World Junior Championships
| Bronze medal – third place | 2014 Alor Setar | Mixed team |

Supak Jomkoh (Thai: สุภัค จอมเกาะ; born 4 September 1996) is a Thai badminton player affiliated with SCG academy who plays both in the mixed and men's doubles. He competed for Thailand at the 2022 Asian Games in the men's doubles with Kittinupong Kedren, mixed doubles with Supissara Paewsampran, and men's team events. Jomkoh and Kedren also competed for Thailand at the 2024 Summer Olympics in the men's doubles event.

== Achievements ==
=== BWF International Challenge/Series (5 titles, 1 runner-up) ===
Men's doubles
| Year | Tournament | Partner | Opponent | Score | Result |
|---|---|---|---|---|---|
| 2018 | Nepal International | (Thailand) Wachirawit Sothon | (Thailand) Warit Sarapat (Thailand) Panachai Worasaktayanan | 21–11, 21–15 | (gold) Winner |
| 2018 | Bangladesh International | (Thailand) Wachirawit Sothon | (Indonesia) Leo Rolly Carnando (Indonesia) Daniel Marthin | 16–21, 11–21 | (silver) Runner-up |
| 2019 | Slovak Open | (Thailand) Wachirawit Sothon | (Bulgaria) Daniel Nikolov (Bulgaria) Ivan Rusev | 21–13, 21–14 | (gold) Winner |

Mixed doubles
| Year | Tournament | Partner | Opponent | Score | Result |
|---|---|---|---|---|---|
| 2018 | Nepal International | (Thailand) Supissara Paewsampran | (Thailand) Panachai Worasaktayanan (Thailand) Pitchayanin Ungka | 19–21, 21–15, 21–14 | (gold) Winner |
| 2019 | Slovak Open | (Thailand) Supissara Paewsampran | (Spain) Alberto Zapico (Spain) Lorena Uslé | 21–18, 21–14 | (gold) Winner |
| 2019 | Nepal International | (Thailand) Supissara Paewsampran | (South Korea) Kim Sa-rang (South Korea) Kim Ha-na | 21–18, 21–16 | (gold) Winner |

BWF International Challenge tournament
BWF International Series tournament
BWF Future Series tournament
