= 2021 Indonesia Open =

2021 badminton tournament in Bali

Tournament details
- Dates: 23–28 November
- Level: Super 1000
- Total prize money: US$850,000
- Venue: Bali International Convention Center
- Location: Badung Regency, Bali, Indonesia

Champions
- Men's singles: (Denmark) Viktor Axelsen
- Women's singles: (South Korea) An Se-young
- Men's doubles: (Indonesia) Marcus Fernaldi Gideon (Indonesia) Kevin Sanjaya Sukamuljo
- Women's doubles: (Japan) Nami Matsuyama (Japan) Chiharu Shida
- Mixed doubles: (Thailand) Dechapol Puavaranukroh (Thailand) Sapsiree Taerattanachai

The 2021 Indonesia Open (officially known as the SimInvest Indonesia Open 2021 for sponsorship reasons) was a badminton tournament that took place at the Bali International Convention Center in Nusa Dua, Badung Regency, Bali, Indonesia, from 23 to 28 November 2021. It had a total prize of US$850,000.

== Tournament ==
The 2021 Indonesia Open was the ninth tournament according to the 2021 BWF World Tour after many tournaments got canceled due to the COVID-19 pandemic earlier of the year. It was a part of the Indonesia Open, which has been held since 1982 and was organized by the Badminton Association of Indonesia with sanction from BWF. It was also part of the Indonesia Badminton Festival in which three tournaments; the Indonesia Masters and World Tour Finals, together with this tournament were held at the same venue, played back-to-back.

=== Venue ===
This tournament was held at Bali International Convention Center in Nusa Dua, Badung Regency, Bali, Indonesia.

=== Point distribution ===
Below is the point distribution table for each phase of the tournament based on the BWF points system for the BWF World Tour Super 1000 event.

Winner	Runner-up	3/4	5/8	9/16	17/32
12,000	10,200	8,400	6,600	4,800	3,000

=== Prize money ===
The total prize money for this tournament was US$850,000. The distribution of the prize money was in accordance with BWF regulations.

Event	Winner	Finalist	Semi-finals	Quarter-finals	Last 16	Last 32
Singles	$59,500	$28,900	$11,900	$4,675	$2.550	$850
Doubles	$62,900	$29,750	$11,900	$5,312.50	$2,762.50	$850

== Men's singles ==
=== Seeds ===
1. (Japan) Kento Momota (second round)
2. (Denmark) Viktor Axelsen (champion)
3. (Denmark) Anders Antonsen (quarter-finals)
4. (Chinese Taipei) Chou Tien-chen (second round)
5. (Indonesia) Anthony Sinisuka Ginting (first round)
6. (Indonesia) Jonatan Christie (semi-finals)
7. (Malaysia) Lee Zii Jia (first round)
8. (Hong Kong) Ng Ka Long (first round)

=== Finals ===
Semi-finals
(Singapore) Loh Kean Yew	21	21
(Denmark) Rasmus Gemke	14	7
6	(Indonesia) Jonatan Christie	19	15
2	(Denmark) Viktor Axelsen	21	21

Final
(Singapore) Loh Kean Yew	13	21	13
2	(Denmark) Viktor Axelsen	21	9	21

=== Top half ===
==== Section 1 ====
First Round
1	(Japan) K Momota	23	21
(India) L Sen	21	15
(India) Parupalli K	11	14
(Singapore) Loh K Y	21	21
8	(Hong Kong) Ng K L	20	21	19
(Japan) K Tsuneyama	22	13	21
(Denmark) H-K Vittinghus	21	21
(Thailand) K Wangcharoen	18	12

Second Round
1	(Japan) K Momota	7	21	19
(Singapore) Loh K Y	21	17	21
(Japan) K Tsuneyama	21	18	13
(Denmark) H-K Vittinghus	10	21	21

Quarter-finals
(Singapore) Loh K Y	21	21
(Denmark) H-K Vittinghus	9	4

==== Section 2 ====
First Round
4	(Chinese Taipei) Chou T-c	21	21
(Hong Kong) Lee C Y	12	14
(France) T Rouxel	13	13
(Japan) K Nishimoto	21	21
7	(Malaysia) Lee Z J	21	23	16
(Denmark) R Gemke	13	25	21
(Indonesia) S H Rhustavito	21	15	21
(Thailand) S Thammasin	12	21	16

Second Round
4	(Chinese Taipei) Chou T-c	21	15	11
(Japan) K Nishimoto	18	21	21
(Denmark) R Gemke	21
(Indonesia) S H Rhustavito	12^{r}

Quarter-finals
(Japan) K Nishimoto	18	17
(Denmark) R Gemke	21	21

=== Bottom half ===
==== Section 3 ====
First Round
PFR	(Indonesia) C A Dwi Wardoyo	21	21
PFR	(Indonesia) H Kho Wibowo	11	18
(Malaysia) Liew D	14	15
6	(Indonesia) J Christie	21	21
(Chinese Taipei) Wang T-w	21	21
(Indonesia) T Sugiarto	17	17
(Thailand) K Vitidsarn	15	21	17
3	(Denmark) A Antonsen	21	17	21

Second Round
PFR	(Indonesia) C A Dwi Wardoyo	11	12
6	(Indonesia) J Christie	21	21
(Chinese Taipei) Wang T-w	21	13	14
3	(Denmark) A Antonsen	18	21	21

Quarter-finals
6	(Indonesia) J Christie	w	/	o
3	(Denmark) A Antonsen

==== Section 4 ====
First Round
(India) B. Sai Praneeth	21	21
(France) T J Popov	19	18
PFR	(France) C Popov	21	21
5	(Indonesia) A S Ginting	17	18
(India) S Kidambi	21	19	21
(India) Prannoy K	15	21	12
(Japan) K Watanabe	14	14
2	(Denmark) V Axelsen	21	21

Second Round
(India) B. Sai Praneeth	21	14	21
PFR	(France) C Popov	17	21	19
(India) S Kidambi	14	18
2	(Denmark) V Axelsen	21	21

Quarter-finals
(India) B. Sai Praneeth	12	8
2	(Denmark) V Axelsen	21	21

== Women's singles ==
=== Seeds ===
1. (Japan) Akane Yamaguchi (quarter-finals)
2. (Thailand) Ratchanok Intanon (final)
3. (India) P. V. Sindhu (semi-finals)
4. (South Korea) An Se-young (champion)
5. (Thailand) Pornpawee Chochuwong (semi-finals)
6. (Canada) Michelle Li (first round)
7. (Thailand) Busanan Ongbamrungphan (second round)
8. (Japan) Sayaka Takahashi (second round)

=== Finals ===
Semi-finals
5	(Thailand) Pornpawee Chochuwong	19	19
4	(South Korea) An Se-young	21	21
3	(India) P. V. Sindhu	21	9	14
2	(Thailand) Ratchanok Intanon	15	21	21

Final
4	(South Korea) An Se-young	21	22
2	(Thailand) Ratchanok Intanon	17	20

=== Top half ===
==== Section 1 ====
First Round
1	(Japan) A Yamaguchi	21	21
(Ukraine) M Ulitina	13	10
(Singapore) Yeo J M	21	21
(Poland) J Hart	9	10
5	(Thailand) P Chochuwong	21	21
(Belgium) L Tan	12	12
(Thailand) S Katethong	16	15
(Indonesia) G M Tunjung	21	21

Second Round
1	(Japan) A Yamaguchi	21	19	21
(Singapore) Yeo J M	15	21	14
5	(Thailand) P Chochuwong	11	21	22
(Indonesia) G M Tunjung	21	9	20

Quarter-finals
1	(Japan) A Yamaguchi	6	23	11
5	(Thailand) P Chochuwong	21	21	21

==== Section 2 ====
First Round
4	(South Korea) An S-y	21	21
(Indonesia) R Hartawan	11	8
(France) L Huet	22	21
(Spain) C Azurmendi	20	10
8	(Japan) S Takahashi	21	21
(Japan) S Kawakami	14	14
(Thailand) P Chaiwan	21	21
PFR	(Indonesia) Y Y Susanto	18	19

Second Round
4	(South Korea) An S-y	21	21
(France) L Huet	8	10
8	(Japan) S Takahashi	19	21	14
(Thailand) P Chaiwan	21	14	21

Quarter-finals
4	(South Korea) An S-y	21	21
(Thailand) P Chaiwan	13	11

=== Bottom half ===
==== Section 3 ====
First Round
(France) M Batomene	23	14	17
(Spain) B Corrales	21	21	21
(South Korea) Sim Y-j	21	21
6	(Canada) M Li	11	9
(Germany) Y Li	19	23	21
(Turkey) N Yiğit	21	21	13
(Japan) A Ohori	21	17	17
3	(India) P. V. Sindhu	17	21	21

Second Round
(Spain) B Corrales	13	14
(South Korea) Sim Y-j	21	21
(Germany) Y Li	12	18
3	(India) P. V. Sindhu	21	21

Quarter-finals
(South Korea) Sim Y-j	21	19	14
3	(India) P. V. Sindhu	14	21	21

==== Section 4 ====
First Round
(Indonesia) Fitriani	14	21	11
(Japan) A Takahashi	21	14	21
(Russia) E Kosetskaya	10	13
7	(Thailand) B Ongbamrungphan	21	21
(Chinese Taipei) Pai Y-p	14	21	21
(Denmark) L Christophersen	21	18	11
(South Korea) Kim G-e	19	12
2	(Thailand) R Intanon	21	21

Second Round
(Japan) A Takahashi	21	22
7	(Thailand) B Ongbamrungphan	7	20
(Chinese Taipei) Pai Y-p	11	16
2	(Thailand) R Intanon	21	21

Quarter-finals
(Japan) A Takahashi	17	12
2	(Thailand) R Intanon	21	21

== Men's doubles ==
=== Seeds ===
1. (Indonesia) Marcus Fernaldi Gideon / Kevin Sanjaya Sukamuljo (champions)
2. (Indonesia) Mohammad Ahsan / Hendra Setiawan (first round)
3. (Chinese Taipei) Lee Yang / Wang Chi-lin (second round)
4. (Indonesia) Fajar Alfian / Muhammad Rian Ardianto (quarter-finals)
5. (Malaysia) Aaron Chia / Soh Wooi Yik (second round)
6. (India) Chirag Shetty / Satwiksairaj Rankireddy (semi-finals)
7. (Denmark) Kim Astrup / Anders Skaarup Rasmussen (quarter-finals)
8. (Russia) Vladimir Ivanov / Ivan Sozonov (first round)

=== Finals ===
Semi-finals
1	(Indonesia) Marcus Fernaldi Gideon (Indonesia) Kevin Sanjaya Sukamuljo	21	21
6	(India) Satwiksairaj Rankireddy (India) Chirag Shetty	16	18
(Japan) Akira Koga (Japan) Taichi Saito	20	14
(Japan) Takuro Hoki (Japan) Yugo Kobayashi	22	21

Final
1	(Indonesia) Marcus Fernaldi Gideon (Indonesia) Kevin Sanjaya Sukamuljo	21	21
(Japan) Takuro Hoki (Japan) Yugo Kobayashi	14	18

=== Top half ===
==== Section 1 ====
First Round
1	(Indonesia) M F Gideon (Indonesia) K S Sukamuljo	12	21	21
(Japan) K Matsui (Japan) Y Takeuchi	21	18	15
(India) Arjun M.R. (India) D Kapila	20	13
(South Korea) Choi S-g (South Korea) Kim W-h	22	21
5	(Malaysia) A Chia (Malaysia) Soh W Y	25	21
(Germany) M Lamsfuß (Germany) M Seidel	23	12
(Malaysia) Ong Y S (Malaysia) Teo E Y	21	21
(Malaysia) Tan K M (Malaysia) Tan W K	11	11

Second Round
1	(Indonesia) M F Gideon (Indonesia) K S Sukamuljo	12	21	21
(South Korea) Choi S-g (South Korea) Kim W-h	21	19	18
5	(Malaysia) A Chia (Malaysia) Soh W Y	14	17
(Malaysia) Ong Y S (Malaysia) Teo E Y	21	21

Quarter-finals
1	(Indonesia) M F Gideon (Indonesia) K S Sukamuljo	14	21	21
(Malaysia) Ong Y S (Malaysia) Teo E Y	21	14	16

==== Section 2 ====
First Round
3	(Chinese Taipei) Lee Y (Chinese Taipei) Wang C-l	21	21
(Malaysia) Goh V S (Malaysia) Low J S	14	16
(Malaysia) Goh S F (Malaysia) N Izzuddin	22	21
(France) C Popov (France) T J Popov	20	10
6	(India) S Rankireddy (India) C Shetty	w	/	o
(South Korea) Kim J-h (South Korea) Na S-s
(Japan) H Okamura (Japan) M Onodera	21	14	16
(South Korea) Kang M-h (South Korea) Seo S-j	9	21	21

Second Round
3	(Chinese Taipei) Lee Y (Chinese Taipei) Wang C-l	15	21
(Malaysia) Goh S F (Malaysia) N Izzuddin	21	23
6	(India) S Rankireddy (India) C Shetty	21	19	23
(South Korea) Kang M-h (South Korea) Seo S-j	15	21	21

Quarter-finals
(Malaysia) Goh S F (Malaysia) N Izzuddin	19	19
6	(India) S Rankireddy (India) C Shetty	21	21

=== Bottom half ===
==== Section 3 ====
First Round
(Thailand) S Jomkoh (Thailand) K Kedren	19	11
(Japan) A Koga (Japan) T Saito	21	21
(Chinese Taipei) Lu C-y (Chinese Taipei) Yang P-h	21	15	21
8	(Russia) V Ivanov (Russia) I Sozonov	17	21	19
(Indonesia) S K Gutama (Indonesia) M R P Isfahani	18	20
(Indonesia) M S Fikri (Indonesia) B Maulana	21	22
(Indonesia) L R Carnando (Indonesia) D Marthin	17	20
4	(Indonesia) F Alfian (Indonesia) M R Ardianto	21	22

Second Round
(Japan) A Koga (Japan) T Saito	26	21
(Chinese Taipei) Lu C-y (Chinese Taipei) Yang P-h	24	7
(Indonesia) M S Fikri (Indonesia) B Maulana	11	10
4	(Indonesia) F Alfian (Indonesia) M R Ardianto	21	21

Quarter-finals
(Japan) A Koga (Japan) T Saito	21	13	21
4	(Indonesia) F Alfian (Indonesia) M R Ardianto	10	21	14

==== Section 4 ====
First Round
(Indonesia) P A S Dadiara (Indonesia) B S Elohim	14	11
(Japan) M Kaneko (Japan) Y Kubota	21	21
(France) L Corvée (France) R Labar	20	11
7	(Denmark) K Astrup (Denmark) A S Rasmussen	22	21
(Indonesia) P Kusumawardana (Indonesia) Y Rambitan	18	21	21
(England) B Lane (England) S Vendy	21	17	9
(Japan) T Hoki (Japan) Y Kobayashi	23	15	21
2	(Indonesia) M Ahsan (Indonesia) H Setiawan	21	21	15

Second Round
(Japan) M Kaneko (Japan) Y Kubota	11	14
7	(Denmark) K Astrup (Denmark) A S Rasmussen	21	21
(Indonesia) P Kusumawardana (Indonesia) Y Rambitan	23	25
(Japan) T Hoki (Japan) Y Kobayashi	25	27

Quarter-finals
7	(Denmark) K Astrup (Denmark) A S Rasmussen	21	15	14
(Japan) T Hoki (Japan) Y Kobayashi	14	21	21

== Women's doubles ==
=== Seeds ===
1. (South Korea) Kim So-yeong / Kong Hee-yong (quarter-finals)
2. (Indonesia) Greysia Polii / Apriyani Rahayu (final)
3. (Thailand) Jongkolphan Kititharakul / Rawinda Prajongjai (semi-finals)
4. (Japan) Nami Matsuyama / Chiharu Shida (champions)
5. (Bulgaria) Gabriela Stoeva / Stefani Stoeva (quarter-finals)
6. (England) Chloe Birch / Lauren Smith (second round)
7. (Japan) Mayu Matsumoto / Ayako Sakuramoto (quarter-finals)
8. (Malaysia) Pearly Tan / Thinaah Muralitharan (second round)

=== Finals ===
Semi-finals
(South Korea) Baek Ha-na (South Korea) Lee Yu-rim	19	18
4	(Japan) Nami Matsuyama (Japan) Chiharu Shida	21	21
3	(Thailand) Jongkolphan Kititharakul (Thailand) Rawinda Prajongjai	18	14
2	(Indonesia) Greysia Polii (Indonesia) Apriyani Rahayu	21	21

Final
4	(Japan) Nami Matsuyama (Japan) Chiharu Shida	21	21
2	(Indonesia) Greysia Polii (Indonesia) Apriyani Rahayu	19	19

=== Top half ===
==== Section 1 ====
First Round
(South Korea) Jeong N-e (South Korea) Kim H-j	20	21	21
(Thailand) B Aimsaard (Thailand) N Aimsaard	22	6	11
6	(England) C Birch (England) L Smith	21	21
(Denmark) J Finne-Ipsen (Denmark) M Surrow	15	11
(Germany) L Efler (Germany) I Lohau	17	13
(South Korea) Baek H-n (South Korea) Lee Y-r	21	21

Second Round
1	(South Korea) Kim S-y (South Korea) Kong H-y	21	18	21
(South Korea) Jeong N-e (South Korea) Kim H-j	19	21	16
6	(England) C Birch (England) L Smith	19	9
(South Korea) Baek H-n (South Korea) Lee Y-r	21	21

Quarter-finals
1	(South Korea) Kim S-y (South Korea) Kong H-y	21	19	15
(South Korea) Baek H-n (South Korea) Lee Y-r	18	21	21

==== Section 2 ====
First Round
(Indonesia) S F S Ramadhanti (Indonesia) R Sugiarto
(Thailand) P Supajirakul (Thailand) S Taerattanachai	w	/	o
8	(Malaysia) P Tan (Malaysia) Thinaah M	22	21
(Spain) C Azurmendi (Spain) B Corrales	20	19
(Indonesia) N V Marwah (Indonesia) P Syaikah	11	15
(Indonesia) F D Kusuma (Indonesia) A C Pratiwi	21	21

Second Round
4	(Japan) N Matsuyama (Japan) C Shida	21	21
(Thailand) P Supajirakul (Thailand) S Taerattanachai	17	16
8	(Malaysia) P Tan (Malaysia) Thinaah M	21	20	17
(Indonesia) F D Kusuma (Indonesia) A C Pratiwi	14	22	21

Quarter-finals
4	(Japan) N Matsuyama (Japan) C Shida	21	21
(Indonesia) F D Kusuma (Indonesia) A C Pratiwi	17	13

=== Bottom half ===
==== Section 3 ====
First Round
(Denmark) A Bøje (Denmark) M Poulsen	12	21	24
(Malaysia) Lee M Y (Malaysia) Yap C W	21	19	26
(India) A Ponnappa (India) N. S Reddy	27	18
5	(Bulgaria) G Stoeva (Bulgaria) S Stoeva	29	21
(Indonesia) M Mamahit (Indonesia) T Nadia	21	8	10
(Malaysia) V Hoo K M (Malaysia) Lim C S	15	21	21

Second Round
(Malaysia) Lee M Y (Malaysia) Yap C W	14	15
5	(Bulgaria) G Stoeva (Bulgaria) S Stoeva	21	21
(Malaysia) V Hoo K M (Malaysia) Lim C S	26	12	11
3	(Thailand) J Kititharakul (Thailand) R Prajongjai	24	21	21

Quarter-finals
5	(Bulgaria) G Stoeva (Bulgaria) S Stoeva	10	14
3	(Thailand) J Kititharakul (Thailand) R Prajongjai	21	21

==== Section 4 ====
First Round
(Japan) C Hoshi (Japan) A Matsuda	13	21	9
(Japan) R Iwanaga (Japan) K Nakanishi	21	14	21
(Ukraine) M Stoliarenko (Ukraine) Y Zharka	13	4
7	(Japan) M Matsumoto (Japan) A Sakuramoto	21	21
(Indonesia) F V D Gani (Indonesia) J P Miantoro
(Indonesia) Fitriani (Indonesia) Y Y Susanto	w	/	o

Second Round
(Japan) R Iwanaga (Japan) K Nakanishi	16	20
7	(Japan) M Matsumoto (Japan) A Sakuramoto	21	22
(Indonesia) Fitriani (Indonesia) Y Y Susanto	10	15
2	(Indonesia) G Polii (Indonesia) A Rahayu	21	21

Quarter-finals
7	(Japan) M Matsumoto (Japan) A Sakuramoto	16	21	18
2	(Indonesia) G Polii (Indonesia) A Rahayu	21	12	21

== Mixed doubles ==
=== Seeds ===
1. (Thailand) Dechapol Puavaranukroh / Sapsiree Taerattanachai (champions)
2. (Indonesia) Praveen Jordan / Melati Daeva Oktavianti (second round)
3. (Japan) Yuta Watanabe / Arisa Higashino (final)
4. (England) Marcus Ellis / Lauren Smith (first round)
5. (Malaysia) Chan Peng Soon / Goh Liu Ying (quarter-finals)
6. (Indonesia) Hafiz Faizal / Gloria Emanuelle Widjaja (quarter-finals)
7. (France) Thom Gicquel / Delphine Delrue (first round)
8. (Hong Kong) Tang Chun Man / Tse Ying Suet (quarter-finals)

=== Finals ===
Semi-finals
1	(Thailand) Dechapol Puavaranukroh (Thailand) Sapsiree Taerattanachai	21	18	21
(South Korea) Ko Sung-hyun (South Korea) Eom Hye-won	17	21	14
3	(Japan) Yuta Watanabe (Japan) Arisa Higashino	21	21
(Denmark) Mathias Christiansen (Denmark) Alexandra Bøje	16	12

Final
1	(Thailand) Dechapol Puavaranukroh (Thailand) Sapsiree Taerattanachai	21	21
3	(Japan) Yuta Watanabe (Japan) Arisa Higashino	12	13

=== Top half ===
==== Section 1 ====
First Round
1	(Thailand) D Puavaranukroh (Thailand) S Taerattanachai	21	21
(South Korea) Kim Y-h (South Korea) Chae Y-j	10	7
(Japan) Y Kaneko (Japan) M Matsutomo	21	18	15
(Malaysia) Chen T J (Malaysia) Peck Y W	19	21	21
7	(France) T Gicquel (France) D Delrue	17	17
(Indonesia) A Maulana (Indonesia) M C Bandaso	21	21
(Malaysia) Tan K M (Malaysia) Lai P J	22	21
(Malaysia) Goh S H (Malaysia) S J Lai	20	17

Second Round
1	(Thailand) D Puavaranukroh (Thailand) S Taerattanachai	21	21
(Malaysia) Chen T J (Malaysia) Peck Y W	15	14
(Indonesia) A Maulana (Indonesia) M C Bandaso	8	16
(Malaysia) Tan K M (Malaysia) Lai P J	21	21

Quarter-finals
1	(Thailand) D Puavaranukroh (Thailand) S Taerattanachai	21	21
(Malaysia) Tan K M (Malaysia) Lai P J	10	11

==== Section 2 ====
First Round
4	(England) M Ellis (England) L Smith	13	13
(South Korea) Ko S-h (South Korea) Eom H-w	21	21
(Germany) M Lamsfuß (Germany) I Lohau	23	15	21
(Thailand) S Jomkoh (Thailand) S Paewsampran	21	21	15
5	(Malaysia) Chan P S (Malaysia) Goh L Y	21	21
(Indonesia) Z J Sumanti (Indonesia) H Julimarbela	12	17
(India) V G Prasad (India) J Dewangan	12	4
(Germany) J R Jansen (Germany) L Efler	21	21

Second Round
(South Korea) Ko S-h (South Korea) Eom H-w	12	21	21
(Germany) M Lamsfuß (Germany) I Lohau	21	17	15
5	(Malaysia) Chan P S (Malaysia) Goh L Y	21	21
(Germany) J R Jansen (Germany) L Efler	9	13

Quarter-finals
(South Korea) Ko S-h (South Korea) Eom H-w	15	21	21
5	(Malaysia) Chan P S (Malaysia) Goh L Y	21	16	18

=== Bottom half ===
==== Section 3 ====
First Round
(India) D Kapila (India) N. S Reddy	7	12
(Japan) K Yamashita (Japan) N Shinoya	21	21
(South Korea) Seo S-j (South Korea) Kim H-j	12	21	19
8	(Hong Kong) Tang C M (Hong Kong) Tse Y S	21	19	21
(Indonesia) R N Kusharjanto (Indonesia) L A Kusumawati	20	21	16
(Hong Kong) Chang T C (Hong Kong) Ng W Y	22	16	21
(Malaysia) Hoo P R (Malaysia) Cheah Y S	18	12
3	(Japan) Y Watanabe (Japan) A Higashino	21	21

Second Round
(Japan) K Yamashita (Japan) N Shinoya	15	19
8	(Hong Kong) Tang C M (Hong Kong) Tse Y S	21	21
(Hong Kong) Chang T C (Hong Kong) Ng W Y	17	12
3	(Japan) Y Watanabe (Japan) A Higashino	21	21

Quarter-finals
8	(Hong Kong) Tang C M (Hong Kong) Tse Y S	17	8
3	(Japan) Y Watanabe (Japan) A Higashino	21	21

==== Section 4 ====
First Round
PFR	(Japan) T Hoki (Japan) N Matsuyama	22	21	21
(India) B. S Reddy (India) A Ponnappa	24	12	19
(New Zealand) O Leydon-Davis (New Zealand) A Pak	17	16
6	(Indonesia) H Faizal (Indonesia) G E Widjaja	21	21
(Denmark) M Christiansen (Denmark) A Bøje	21	13	21
(Indonesia) R Rivaldy (Indonesia) P H Mentari	14	21	16
(Japan) Y Nishikawa (Japan) S Ozaki	0^{r}
2	(Indonesia) P Jordan (Indonesia) M D Oktavianti	1

Second Round
PFR	(Japan) T Hoki (Japan) N Matsuyama	21	10	18
6	(Indonesia) H Faizal (Indonesia) G E Widjaja	19	21	21
(Denmark) M Christiansen (Denmark) A Bøje	23	21
2	(Indonesia) P Jordan (Indonesia) M D Oktavianti	21	14

Quarter-finals
6	(Indonesia) H Faizal (Indonesia) G E Widjaja	21	11	18
(Denmark) M Christiansen (Denmark) A Bøje	14	21	21

Preceded by 2021 Indonesia Masters	BWF World Tour; 2021 BWF season	Succeeded by 2021 BWF World Tour Finals
