= 2021 Indonesia Masters =

2021 badminton tournament in Bali

Tournament details
- Dates: 16–21 November
- Level: Super 750
- Total prize money: US$600,000
- Venue: Bali International Convention Center
- Location: Badung Regency, Bali, Indonesia

Champions
- Men's singles: (Japan) Kento Momota
- Women's singles: (South Korea) An Se-young
- Men's doubles: (Japan) Takuro Hoki (Japan) Yugo Kobayashi
- Women's doubles: (Japan) Nami Matsuyama (Japan) Chiharu Shida
- Mixed doubles: (Thailand) Dechapol Puavaranukroh (Thailand) Sapsiree Taerattanachai

The 2021 Indonesia Masters (officially known as the Daihatsu Indonesia Masters 2021 for sponsorship reasons) was a badminton tournament that took place at the Bali International Convention Center in Nusa Dua, Badung Regency, Bali, Indonesia, from 16 to 21 November 2021 and had a total prize of US$600,000.

In 2021, the tournament got upgraded from a Super 500 to a Super 750.

== Tournament ==
The 2021 Indonesia Masters was the 8th tournament according to the 2021 BWF World Tour as many tournaments got canceled due to the COVID-19 pandemic. It was a part of the Indonesia Masters, which had been held since 2010. The tournament was organized by the Badminton Association of Indonesia with sanction from BWF. It was also part of the Indonesia Badminton Festival in which three tournaments; the Indonesia Open and World Tour Finals, together with this tournament were held at the same venue, played back-to-back.

=== Venue ===
This tournament was held at Bali International Convention Center in Nusa Dua, Badung Regency, Bali, Indonesia.

=== Point distribution ===
Below is the point distribution table for each phase of the tournament based on the BWF points system for the BWF World Tour Super 750 event.

Winner	Runner-up	3/4	5/8	9/16	17/32
11,000	9,350	7,700	6,050	4,320	2,660

=== Prize money ===
The total prize money for this tournament was US$600,000. The distribution of the prize money was in accordance with BWF regulations.

Event	Winner	Finalist	Semi-finals	Quarter-finals	Last 16	Last 32
Singles	$42,000	$20,400	$8,400	$3,300	$1,800	$600
Doubles	$44,400	$21,000	$8,400	$3,750	$1,950	$600

== Men's singles ==
=== Seeds ===
1. (Japan) Kento Momota (champion)
2. (Denmark) Viktor Axelsen (second round)
3. (Denmark) Anders Antonsen (final)
4. (Chinese Taipei) Chou Tien-chen (semi-finals)
5. (Indonesia) Anthony Sinisuka Ginting (first round)
6. (Indonesia) Jonatan Christie (second round)
7. (Malaysia) Lee Zii Jia (first round)
8. (Hong Kong) Ng Ka Long (quarter-finals)

=== Finals ===
Semi-finals
1	(Japan) Kento Momota	21	21
4	(Chinese Taipei) Chou Tien-chen	19	11
3	(Denmark) Anders Antonsen	21	21
(India) Srikanth Kidambi	14	9

Final
1	(Japan) Kento Momota	21	21
3	(Denmark) Anders Antonsen	17	11

=== Top half ===
==== Section 1 ====
First Round
1	(Japan) K Momota	21	21
(Indonesia) T Sugiarto	12	16
(Japan) K Tsuneyama	17	21	17
(India) L Sen	21	18	21
7	(Malaysia) Lee Z J	9^{r}
(Denmark) R Gemke	11
(France) T J Popov	21	21
(South Korea) Heo K-h	17	14

Second Round
1	(Japan) K Momota	21	21
(India) L Sen	13	19
(Denmark) R Gemke	21	21
(France) T J Popov	15	16

Quarter-finals
1	(Japan) K Momota	21	21
(Denmark) R Gemke	15	5

==== Section 2 ====
First Round
4	(Chinese Taipei) Chou T-c	22	21
(France) T Rouxel	20	17
(Singapore) Loh K Y	17	21	21
(Chinese Taipei) Wang T-w	21	14	15
8	(Hong Kong) Ng K L	21	21
PFR	(Indonesia) C A D Wardoyo	16	19
(Japan) K Watanabe	21	21
(Thailand) K Wangcharoen	12	14

Second Round
4	(Chinese Taipei) Chou T-c	21	21
(Singapore) Loh K Y	10	12
8	(Hong Kong) Ng K L	21	21
(Japan) K Watanabe	16	14

Quarter-finals
4	(Chinese Taipei) Chou T-c	21	12	21
8	(Hong Kong) Ng K L	19	21	18

=== Bottom half ===
==== Section 3 ====
First Round
(Indonesia) S H Rhustavito	16	21	22
(India) B. Sai Praneeth	21	14	20
(Thailand) K Vitidsarn	19	21	21
5	(Indonesia) A S Ginting	21	14	13
(India) Parupalli K	10	19
(Denmark) H-K Vittinghus	21	21
(Japan) K Nishimoto	16	16
3	(Denmark) A Antonsen	21	21

Second Round
(Indonesia) S H Rhustavito	14	9
(Thailand) K Vitidsarn	21	21
(Denmark) H-K Vittinghus	17	16
3	(Denmark) A Antonsen	21	21

Quarter-finals
(Thailand) K Vitidsarn	11	17
3	(Denmark) A Antonsen	21	21

==== Section 4 ====
First Round
(India) S Kidambi	21	15	21
PFR	(France) C Popov	18	21	16
(Thailand) S Thammasin	18	22	17
6	(Indonesia) J Christie	21	20	21
(India) Prannoy K	22	21
(Malaysia) Liew D	20	19
(Hong Kong) Lee C Y	10	14
2	(Denmark) V Axelsen	21	21

Second Round
(India) S Kidambi	13	21	21
6	(Indonesia) J Christie	21	18	15
(India) Prannoy K	14	21	21
2	(Denmark) V Axelsen	21	19	16

Quarter-finals
(India) S Kidambi	21	21
(India) Prannoy K	7	18

== Women's singles ==
=== Seeds ===
1. (Japan) Akane Yamaguchi (final)
2. (Thailand) Ratchanok Intanon (second round)
3. (India) P. V. Sindhu (semi-finals)
4. (South Korea) An Se-young (champion)
5. (Thailand) Pornpawee Chochuwong (quarter-finals)
6. (Canada) Michelle Li (first round)
7. (Thailand) Busanan Ongbamrungphan (first round)
8. (Japan) Sayaka Takahashi (quarter-finals)

=== Finals ===
Semi-finals
1	(Japan) Akane Yamaguchi	21	21
3	(India) P. V. Sindhu	13	9
4	(South Korea) An Se-young	21	21
(Thailand) Phittayaporn Chaiwan	16	13

Final
1	(Japan) Akane Yamaguchi	17	19
4	(South Korea) An Se-young	21	21

=== Top half ===
==== Section 1 ====
First Round
1	(Japan) A Yamaguchi	21	21
(Indonesia) R Hartawan	12	14
(South Korea) Sim Y-j	14	21	15
(South Korea) Kim G-e	21	10	21
5	(Thailand) P Chochuwong	21	21
(France) M Batomene	8	13
(Japan) A Ohori	21	21
(Belgium) L Tan	15	10

Second Round
1	(Japan) A Yamaguchi	21	14	21
(South Korea) Kim G-e	17	21	16
5	(Thailand) P Chochuwong	21	21
(Japan) A Ohori	13	12

Quarter-finals
1	(Japan) A Yamaguchi	8	21	21
5	(Thailand) P Chochuwong	21	12	10

==== Section 2 ====
First Round
3	(India) P. V. Sindhu	21	21
(Thailand) S Katethong	15	19
(Spain) C Azurmendi	21	21
(Indonesia) Fitriani	18	14
6	(Canada) M Li	14	18
(Turkey) N Yiğit	21	21
(Ukraine) M Ulitina	21	21
(France) L Huet	17	12

Second Round
3	(India) P. V. Sindhu	17	21	21
(Spain) C Azurmendi	21	7	12
(Turkey) N Yiğit	21	21
(Ukraine) M Ulitina	18	13

Quarter-finals
3	(India) P. V. Sindhu	21	21
(Turkey) N Yiğit	13	10

=== Bottom half ===
==== Section 3 ====
First Round
(Spain) B Corrales	11	21	9
(Germany) Y Li	21	10	21
(Indonesia) G M Tunjung	18	21	20
8	(Japan) S Takahashi	21	11	22
(Russia) E Kosetskaya	21	19	21
(Chinese Taipei) Pai Y-p	19	21	11
(Poland) J Hart	8	9
4	(South Korea) An S-y	21	21

Second Round
(Germany) Y Li	18	12
8	(Japan) S Takahashi	21	21
(Russia) E Kosetskaya	11	12
4	(South Korea) An S-y	21	21

Quarter-finals
8	(Japan) S Takahashi	15	14
4	(South Korea) An S-y	21	21

==== Section 4 ====
First Round
(Denmark) L Christophersen	18	18
(Singapore) Yeo J M	21	21
(Japan) S Kawakami	16	21	21
7	(Thailand) B Ongbamrungphan	21	19	15
(Thailand) P Chaiwan	21	21
PFR	(Indonesia) Y Y Susanto	9	19
(Japan) A Takahashi	15	10
2	(Thailand) R Intanon	21	21

Second Round
(Singapore) Yeo J M	21	14	21
(Japan) S Kawakami	19	21	14
(Thailand) P Chaiwan	18	21	21
2	(Thailand) R Intanon	21	12	17

Quarter-finals
(Singapore) Yeo J M	12	13
(Thailand) P Chaiwan	21	21

== Men's doubles ==
=== Seeds ===
1. (Indonesia) Marcus Fernaldi Gideon / Kevin Sanjaya Sukamuljo (final)
2. (Indonesia) Mohammad Ahsan / Hendra Setiawan (second round)
3. (Chinese Taipei) Lee Yang / Wang Chi-lin (quarter-finals)
4. (Indonesia) Fajar Alfian / Muhammad Rian Ardianto (first round)
5. (Malaysia) Aaron Chia / Soh Wooi Yik (semi-finals)
6. (India) Chirag Shetty / Satwiksairaj Rankireddy (first round)
7. (Denmark) Kim Astrup / Anders Skaarup Rasmussen (quarter-finals)
8. (Russia) Vladimir Ivanov / Ivan Sozonov (first round)

=== Finals ===
Semi-finals
1	(Indonesia) Marcus Fernaldi Gideon (Indonesia) Kevin Sanjaya Sukamuljo	18	21	21
(Malaysia) Ong Yew Sin (Malaysia) Teo Ee Yi	21	17	11
5	(Malaysia) Aaron Chia (Malaysia) Soh Wooi Yik	18	21	17
(Japan) Takuro Hoki (Japan) Yugo Kobayashi	21	19	21

Final
1	(Indonesia) Marcus Fernaldi Gideon (Indonesia) Kevin Sanjaya Sukamuljo	11	21	19
(Japan) Takuro Hoki (Japan) Yugo Kobayashi	21	17	21

=== Top half ===
==== Section 1 ====
First Round
1	(Indonesia) M F Gideon (Indonesia) K S Sukamuljo	21	21
(South Korea) Choi S-g (South Korea) Kim W-h	19	17
(France) L Corvée (France) R Labar	21	21
(Malaysia) Goh V S (Malaysia) Low J S	18	18
8	(Russia) V Ivanov (Russia) I Sozonov	19	17
(Indonesia) P Kusumawardana (Indonesia) Y Rambitan	21	21
(Germany) M Lamsfuß (Germany) M Seidel	10^{r}
(Japan) A Koga (Japan) T Saito	11

Second Round
1	(Indonesia) M F Gideon (Indonesia) K S Sukamuljo	21	21
(France) L Corvée (France) R Labar	13	19
(Indonesia) P Kusumawardana (Indonesia) Y Rambitan	21	23
(Japan) A Koga (Japan) T Saito	18	21

Quarter-finals
1	(Indonesia) M F Gideon (Indonesia) K S Sukamuljo	22	21
(Indonesia) P Kusumawardana (Indonesia) Y Rambitan	20	17

==== Section 2 ====
First Round
4	(Indonesia) F Alfian (Indonesia) M R Ardianto	21	18	20
(Indonesia) M S Fikri (Indonesia) B Maulana	13	21	22
(South Korea) Kang M-h (South Korea) Seo S-j	10	17
(Malaysia) Goh S F (Malaysia) N Izzuddin	21	21
6	(India) S Rankireddy (India) C Shetty	17	15
(Malaysia) Ong Y S (Malaysia) Teo E Y	21	21
(Malaysia) Tan K M (Malaysia) Tan W K	21	14	17
(Indonesia) S K Gutama (Indonesia) M R P Isfahani	13	21	21

Second Round
(Indonesia) M S Fikri (Indonesia) B Maulana	18	20
(Malaysia) Goh S F (Malaysia) N Izzuddin	21	22
(Malaysia) Ong Y S (Malaysia) Teo E Y	21	21
(Indonesia) S K Gutama (Indonesia) M R P Isfahani	17	12

Quarter-finals
(Malaysia) Goh S F (Malaysia) N Izzuddin	13	21	18
(Malaysia) Ong Y S (Malaysia) Teo E Y	21	18	21

=== Bottom half ===
==== Section 3 ====
First Round
PFR	(Indonesia) P A S Dadiara (Indonesia) B S Elohim	21	16	21
(Indonesia) G D Putra (Indonesia) G C W Wijaya	18	21	10
(England) B Lane (England) S Vendy	11	21	8
5	(Malaysia) A Chia (Malaysia) Soh W Y	21	15	21
(Indonesia) L R Carnando (Indonesia) D Marthin	18	23
(Chinese Taipei) Lu C-y (Chinese Taipei) Yang P-h	21	25
(Japan) K Matsui (Japan) Y Takeuchi	21	12	12
3	(Chinese Taipei) Lee Y (Chinese Taipei) Wang C-l	18	21	21

Second Round
PFR	(Indonesia) P A S Dadiara (Indonesia) B S Elohim	12	8
5	(Malaysia) A Chia (Malaysia) Soh W Y	21	21
(Chinese Taipei) Lu C-y (Chinese Taipei) Yang P-h	13	16
3	(Chinese Taipei) Lee Y (Chinese Taipei) Wang C-l	21	21

Quarter-finals
5	(Malaysia) A Chia (Malaysia) Soh W Y	21	21
3	(Chinese Taipei) Lee Y (Chinese Taipei) Wang C-l	13	15

==== Section 4 ====
First Round
(Japan) H Okamura (Japan) M Onodera	21	23	19
(Thailand) S Jomkoh (Thailand) K Kedren	19	25	21
(Japan) M Kaneko (Japan) Y Kubota	10	15
7	(Denmark) K Astrup (Denmark) A S Rasmussen	21	21
(Japan) T Hoki (Japan) Y Kobayashi	21	21
(India) Arjun M.R. (India) D Kapila	17	12
(France) C Popov (France) T J Popov	17	14
2	(Indonesia) M Ahsan (Indonesia) H Setiawan	21	21

Second Round
(Thailand) S Jomkoh (Thailand) K Kedren	15	15
7	(Denmark) K Astrup (Denmark) A S Rasmussen	21	21
(Japan) T Hoki (Japan) Y Kobayashi	11	21	21
2	(Indonesia) M Ahsan (Indonesia) H Setiawan	21	15	12

Quarter-finals
7	(Denmark) K Astrup (Denmark) A S Rasmussen	21	14	19
(Japan) T Hoki (Japan) Y Kobayashi	19	21	21

== Women's doubles ==
=== Seeds ===
1. (South Korea) Kim So-yeong / Kong Hee-yong (semi-finals)
2. (Indonesia) Greysia Polii / Apriyani Rahayu (quarter-finals)
3. (Thailand) Jongkolphan Kititharakul / Rawinda Prajongjai (quarter-finals)
4. (Japan) Nami Matsuyama / Chiharu Shida (champions)
5. (Bulgaria) Gabriela Stoeva / Stefani Stoeva (second round)
6. (England) Chloe Birch / Lauren Smith (second round)
7. (Japan) Mayu Matsumoto / Ayako Sakuramoto (second round)
8. (Malaysia) Pearly Tan / Thinaah Muralitharan (quarter-finals)

=== Finals ===
Semi-finals
1	(South Korea) Kim So-yeong (South Korea) Kong Hee-yong	12	18
(South Korea) Jeong Na-eun (South Korea) Kim Hye-jeong	21	21
4	(Japan) Nami Matsuyama (Japan) Chiharu Shida	22	21	21
(Thailand) Puttita Supajirakul (Thailand) Sapsiree Taerattanachai	24	17	18

Final
(South Korea) Jeong Na-eun (South Korea) Kim Hye-jeong	9	11
4	(Japan) Nami Matsuyama (Japan) Chiharu Shida	21	21

=== Top half ===
==== Section 1 ====
First Round
(Malaysia) Lee M Y (Malaysia) Yap C W	19	19
(Germany) L Efler (Germany) I Lohau	21	21
6	(England) C Birch (England) L Smith	21	21
(Ukraine) M Stoliarenko (Ukraine) Y Zharka	10	13
(Thailand) B Aimsaard (Thailand) N Aimsaard	21	19	19
(Japan) C Hoshi (Japan) A Matsuda	14	21	21

Second Round
1	(South Korea) Kim S-y (South Korea) Kong H-y	21	21
(Germany) L Efler (Germany) I Lohau	3	4
6	(England) C Birch (England) L Smith	17	21	12
(Japan) C Hoshi (Japan) A Matsuda	21	15	21

Quarter-finals
1	(South Korea) Kim S-y (South Korea) Kong H-y	17	21	21
(Japan) C Hoshi (Japan) A Matsuda	21	11	13

==== Section 2 ====
First Round
(India) A Ponnappa (India) N. S Reddy	9	21	21
(Denmark) A Bøje (Denmark) M Poulsen	21	11	18
5	(Bulgaria) G Stoeva (Bulgaria) S Stoeva	21	21
(Indonesia) M Mamahit (Indonesia) T Nadia	13	9
(South Korea) Jeong N-e (South Korea) Kim H-j	24	21
(Japan) R Iwanaga (Japan) K Nakanishi	22	14

Second Round
3	(Thailand) J Kititharakul (Thailand) R Prajongjai	21	21
(India) A Ponnappa (India) N. S Reddy	18	12
5	(Bulgaria) G Stoeva (Bulgaria) S Stoeva	11	6
(South Korea) Jeong N-e (South Korea) Kim H-j	21	21

Quarter-finals
3	(Thailand) J Kititharakul (Thailand) R Prajongjai	11	16
(South Korea) Jeong N-e (South Korea) Kim H-j	21	21

=== Bottom half ===
==== Section 3 ====
First Round
(Indonesia) F V D Gani (Indonesia) J P Miantoro
(Indonesia) Fitriani (Indonesia) Y Y Susanto	w	/	o
(Malaysia) V Hoo (Malaysia) Lim C S	15	20
8	(Malaysia) P Tan (Malaysia) T Muralitharan	21	22
(Indonesia) F D Kusuma (Indonesia) A C Pratiwi	18	15
(South Korea) Baek H-n (South Korea) Lee Y-r	21	21

Second Round
(Indonesia) Fitriani (Indonesia) Y Y Susanto	8	14
8	(Malaysia) P Tan (Malaysia) T Muralitharan	21	21
(South Korea) Baek H-n (South Korea) Lee Y-r	21	15
4	(Japan) N Matsuyama (Japan) C Shida	23	21

Quarter-finals
8	(Malaysia) P Tan (Malaysia) T Muralitharan	14	15
4	(Japan) N Matsuyama (Japan) C Shida	21	21

==== Section 4 ====
First Round
(Indonesia) S F S Ramadhanti (Indonesia) R Sugiarto	13	21	16
(Thailand) P Supajirakul (Thailand) S Taerattanachai	21	15	21
(Indonesia) N V Marwah (Indonesia) P Syaikah	20	19
7	(Japan) M Matsumoto (Japan) A Sakuramoto	22	21
(Denmark) J Finne-Ipsen (Denmark) M Surrow	21	22	10
(Spain) C Azurmendi (Spain) B Corrales	12	24	21

Second Round
(Thailand) P Supajirakul (Thailand) S Taerattanachai	21	15	21
7	(Japan) M Matsumoto (Japan) A Sakuramoto	17	21	16
(Spain) C Azurmendi (Spain) B Corrales	17	9
2	(Indonesia) G Polii (Indonesia) A Rahayu	21	21

Quarter-finals
(Thailand) P Supajirakul (Thailand) S Taerattanachai	18	21	21
2	(Indonesia) G Polii (Indonesia) A Rahayu	21	13	19

== Mixed doubles ==
=== Seeds ===
1. (Thailand) Dechapol Puavaranukroh / Sapsiree Taerattanachai (champions)
2. (Indonesia) Praveen Jordan / Melati Daeva Oktavianti (first round)
3. (Japan) Yuta Watanabe / Arisa Higashino (semi-finals)
4. (England) Marcus Ellis / Lauren Smith (quarter-finals)
5. (Malaysia) Chan Peng Soon / Goh Liu Ying (first round)
6. (Indonesia) Hafiz Faizal / Gloria Emanuelle Widjaja (quarter-finals)
7. (Hong Kong) Tang Chun Man / Tse Ying Suet (final)
8. (France) Thom Gicquel / Delphine Delrue (first round)

=== Finals ===
Semi-finals
1	(Thailand) Dechapol Puavaranukroh (Thailand) Sapsiree Taerattanachai	26	21
(South Korea) Ko Sung-hyun (South Korea) Eom Hye-won	24	17
3	(Japan) Yuta Watanabe (Japan) Arisa Higashino	21	19	17
7	(Hong Kong) Tang Chun Man (Hong Kong) Tse Ying Suet	18	21	21

Final
1	(Thailand) Dechapol Puavaranukroh (Thailand) Sapsiree Taerattanachai	21	21
7	(Hong Kong) Tang Chun Man (Hong Kong) Tse Ying Suet	11	12

=== Top half ===
==== Section 1 ====
First Round
1	(Thailand) D Puavaranukroh (Thailand) S Taerattanachai	21	21
(Japan) Y Kaneko (Japan) M Matsutomo	12	15
(Malaysia) Chen T J (Malaysia) Peck Y W	21	21
(South Korea) Seo S-j (South Korea) Kim H-j	17	13
5	(Malaysia) Chan P S (Malaysia) Goh L Y	13	19
(Germany) J R Jansen (Germany) L Efler	21	21
(Japan) Y Nishikawa (Japan) S Ozaki	2^{r}
(Malaysia) Hoo P R (Malaysia) Cheah Y S	5

Second Round
1	(Thailand) D Puavaranukroh (Thailand) S Taerattanachai	21	16	21
(Malaysia) Chen T J (Malaysia) Peck Y W	17	21	17
(Germany) J R Jansen (Germany) L Efler	14	19
(Malaysia) Hoo P R (Malaysia) Cheah Y S	21	21

Quarter-finals
1	(Thailand) D Puavaranukroh (Thailand) S Taerattanachai	21	21
(Malaysia) Hoo P R (Malaysia) Cheah Y S	17	9

==== Section 2 ====
First Round
4	(England) M Ellis (England) L Smith	21	21
PFR	(Indonesia) A E Prasetya (Indonesia) M Mahmudin	18	15
(South Korea) Kim Y-h (South Korea) Chae Y-j	19	21	21
(Denmark) M Christiansen (Denmark) A Bøje	21	18	11
8	(France) T Gicquel (France) D Delrue	10	23	19
(South Korea) Ko S-h (South Korea) Eom H-w	21	21	21
(New Zealand) O Leydon-Davis (New Zealand) A Pak	15	10
(Indonesia) Z J Sumanti (Indonesia) H Julimarbela	21	21

Second Round
4	(England) M Ellis (England) L Smith	21	21
(South Korea) Kim Y-h (South Korea) Chae Y-j	14	17
(South Korea) Ko S-h (South Korea) Eom H-w	21	21
(Indonesia) Z J Sumanti (Indonesia) H Julimarbela	18	15

Quarter-finals
4	(England) M Ellis (England) L Smith	17	15
(South Korea) Ko S-h (South Korea) Eom H-w	21	21

=== Bottom half ===
==== Section 3 ====
First Round
(India) V G Prasad (India) J Dewangan	15	12
(Hong Kong) Chang T C (Hong Kong) Ng W Y	21	21
(India) B. S Reddy (India) A Ponnappa	15	16
6	(Indonesia) H Faizal (Indonesia) G E Widjaja	21	21
(Japan) K Yamashita (Japan) N Shinoya	11	21	16
(Indonesia) A Maulana (Indonesia) M C Bandaso	21	12	21
(Malaysia) Tan K M (Malaysia) Lai P J	10	21	16
3	(Japan) Y Watanabe (Japan) A Higashino	21	12	21

Second Round
(Hong Kong) Chang T C (Hong Kong) Ng W Y	21	15	11
6	(Indonesia) H Faizal (Indonesia) G E Widjaja	9	21	21
(Indonesia) A Maulana (Indonesia) M C Bandaso	19	11
3	(Japan) Y Watanabe (Japan) A Higashino	21	21

Quarter-finals
6	(Indonesia) H Faizal (Indonesia) G E Widjaja	21	17	9
3	(Japan) Y Watanabe (Japan) A Higashino	16	21	21

==== Section 4 ====
First Round
(Malaysia) Goh S H (Malaysia) S J Lai	21	21
(Germany) M Lamfuß (Germany) I Lohau	12	15
(Indonesia) R Rivaldy (Indonesia) P H Mentari	21	13	11
7	(Hong Kong) Tang C M (Hong Kong) Tse Y S	14	21	21
(Indonesia) R N Kusharjanto (Indonesia) L A Kusumawati	14	13
(Thailand) S Jomkoh (Thailand) S Paewsampran	21	21
(India) D Kapila (India) N. S Reddy	21	22
2	(Indonesia) P Jordan (Indonesia) M D Oktavianti	11	20

Second Round
(Malaysia) Goh S H (Malaysia) S J Lai	21	7	20
7	(Hong Kong) Tang C M (Hong Kong) Tse Y S	15	21	22
(Thailand) S Jomkoh (Thailand) S Paewsampran	21	21	21
(India) D Kapila (India) N. S Reddy	15	23	18

Quarter-finals
7	(Hong Kong) Tang C M (Hong Kong) Tse Y S	21	21
(Thailand) S Jomkoh (Thailand) S Paewsampran	11	11

Preceded by 2021 Hylo Open	BWF World Tour; 2021 BWF season	Succeeded by 2021 Indonesia Open
