= 2021 BWF World Tour Finals =

2021 badminton tournament in Indonesia

Tournament details
- Dates: 1–5 December
- Edition: 4th
- Level: World Tour Finals
- Total prize money: US$1,500,000
- Venue: Bali International Convention Center
- Location: Nusa Dua, South Kuta, Badung, Bali, Indonesia

Champions
- Men's singles: (Denmark) Viktor Axelsen
- Women's singles: (South Korea) An Se-young
- Men's doubles: (Japan) Takuro Hoki (Japan) Yugo Kobayashi
- Women's doubles: (South Korea) Kim So-yeong (South Korea) Kong Hee-yong
- Mixed doubles: (Thailand) Dechapol Puavaranukroh (Thailand) Sapsiree Taerattanachai

The 2021 BWF World Tour Finals (officially known as the HSBC BWF World Tour Finals 2021 for sponsorship reasons) was the final tournament of the 2021 BWF World Tour. It was held from 1 to 5 December 2021 in Bali, Indonesia and had a total prize of $1,500,000.

== Tournament ==
The 2021 BWF World Tour Finals was the fourth edition of the BWF World Tour Finals and was organized by Badminton Association of Indonesia with sanction from the BWF. This tournament was part of the Indonesia Badminton Festival in which three tournaments; the Indonesia Masters and Indonesia Open, together with this tournament were held at the same venue, played back-to-back. Participation in both tournaments was mandatory to qualify and the performance during the tournaments were counted for this World Tour Finals.

=== Venue ===
This tournament was held at the Bali International Convention Center in Nusa Dua, Badung Regency, Bali, Indonesia. It was originally due to be held for the fourth year in a row at the Tianhe Gymnasium in Guangzhou, China, but was relocated.

=== Point distribution ===
Below is the point distribution for each phase of the tournament based on the BWF points system for the BWF World Tour Finals event.

Winner(s)	Runner(s)-up	Semi-finalists	3rd in group	4th in group
12,000	10,200	8,400	6,600	4,800

=== Prize money ===
The total prize money for this tournament was US$1,500,000. Distribution of prize money was in accordance with BWF regulations.

Achievement	Winner(s)	Runner(s)-up	Semi-finalist(s)	3rd in group	4th in group
Singles	$120,000	$60,000	$30,000	$16,500	$9,000
Doubles	$126,000	$60,000	$30,000	$19,500	$10,500

== Representatives ==
=== Eligible players ===
Below are the eligible players for World Tour Finals. All gold medalists at the 2020 Summer Olympics were qualified for the tournament, but have to compete in both the Indonesia Masters and Indonesia Open to be eligible. Hence, Chinese women's singles player Chen Yufei and mixed pair Wang Yilyu and Huang Dongping had their qualification withdrawn.

Men's singles

Seeds	Rank	NOCs	Players	Performances		
Seeds	Rank	NOCs	Players	Winner(s)	Runner(s)-up	Semi-finalists
Olympic gold medalist
1	1	Denmark (1)	Viktor Axelsen	3: Super 1000: Denmark Open, Indonesia Open; Super 300: Swiss Open	1: Super 1000: All England Open	
Qualified by BWF World Tour rankings
2	2	Malaysia (1)	Lee Zii Jia	1: Super 1000: All England Open	1: Super 500: Hylo Open	1: Super 300: Swiss Open
3	3	India (1)	Srikanth Kidambi			3: Super 750: Indonesia Masters; Super 500: Hylo Open; Super 300: Swiss Open
4	4	Denmark (2)	Rasmus Gemke			1: Super 1000: Indonesia Open
	5	France (1)	Toma Junior Popov	2: Super 300: Spain Masters; Super 100: Orleans Masters		
	6	India (2)	Lakshya Sen			1: Super 500: Hylo Open
	7	Japan (1)	Kento Momota	1: Super 750: Indonesia Masters	1: Super 1000: Denmark Open	1: Super 750: French Open
	8	Thailand (1)	Kunlavut Vitidsarn		1: Super 300: Swiss Open	1: Super 100: Orleans Masters

Women's singles

Seeds	Rank	NOCs	Players	Performances		
Seeds	Rank	NOCs	Players	Winner(s)	Runner(s)-up	Semi-finalists
Qualified by BWF World Tour rankings
1	1	Thailand (1)	Pornpawee Chochuwong		1: Super 1000: All England Open	3: Super 1000: Indonesia Open; Super 300: Swiss Open; Super 100: Orléans Masters
2	2	Japan (1)	Akane Yamaguchi	2: Super 1000: Denmark Open; Super 750: French Open	2: Super 750: Indonesia Masters	
3	3	India (1)	P. V. Sindhu		1: Super 300: Swiss Open	4: Super 1000: All England Open, Indonesia Open; Super 750: French Open, Indonesia Masters
4	4	Thailand (2)	Busanan Ongbamrungphan	2: Super 500: Hylo Open; Super 100: Orleans Masters		
	5	South Korea (1)	An Se-young	2: Super 1000: Indonesia Open; Super 750: Indonesia Masters	1: Super 1000: Denmark Open	1: Super 750: French Open
	8	Denmark (1)	Line Christophersen		2: Super 300: Spain Masters; Super 100: Orleans Masters	
	9	Singapore (1)	Yeo Jia Min		1: Super 500: Hylo Open	
	10	Germany (1)	Yvonne Li			

Men's doubles

Seeds	Rank	NOCs	Players	Performances		
Seeds	Rank	NOCs	Players	Winner(s)	Runner(s)-up	Semi-finalists
Qualified by BWF World Tour rankings
1	1	Indonesia (1)	Marcus Fernaldi Gideon	2: Super 1000: Indonesia Open; Super 500: Hylo Open	2: Super 750: French Open, Indonesia Masters	
1	1	Indonesia (1)	Kevin Sanjaya Sukamuljo	2: Super 1000: Indonesia Open; Super 500: Hylo Open	2: Super 750: French Open, Indonesia Masters	
2	2	Japan (1)	Takuro Hoki	2: Super 1000: Denmark Open; Super 750: Indonesia Masters	1: Super 1000: Indonesia Open	
2	2	Japan (1)	Yugo Kobayashi	2: Super 1000: Denmark Open; Super 750: Indonesia Masters	1: Super 1000: Indonesia Open	
3	3	Denmark (1)	Kim Astrup	1: Super 300: Swiss Open	1: Super 1000: Denmark Open	1: Super 1000: All England Open
3	3	Denmark (1)	Anders Skaarup Rasmussen	1: Super 300: Swiss Open	1: Super 1000: Denmark Open	1: Super 1000: All England Open
4	4	Malaysia (1)	Ong Yew Sin			1: Super 750: Indonesia Masters
4	4	Malaysia (1)	Teo Ee Yi			1: Super 750: Indonesia Masters
	5	France (1)	Christo Popov			1: Super 300: Spain Masters
	5	France (1)	Toma Junior Popov			1: Super 300: Spain Masters
	6	Indonesia (2)	Pramudya Kusumawardana	1: Super 300: Spain Masters		1: Super 500: Hylo Open
	6	Indonesia (2)	Yeremia Rambitan	1: Super 300: Spain Masters		1: Super 500: Hylo Open
	7	India (1)	Satwiksairaj Rankireddy			2: Super 1000: Indonesia Open; Super 300: Swiss Open
	7	India (1)	Chirag Shetty			2: Super 1000: Indonesia Open; Super 300: Swiss Open
Olympic gold medalists
	25	Chinese Taipei (1)	Lee Yang			
	25	Chinese Taipei (1)	Wang Chi-lin			

Women's doubles

Seeds	Rank	NOCs	Players	Performances		
Seeds	Rank	NOCs	Players	Winner(s)	Runner(s)-up	Semi-finalists
Qualified by BWF World Tour rankings
1	1	Thailand (1)	Jongkolphan Kititharakul	1 Super 100: Orleans Masters		4 Super 1000: Denmark Open, Indonesia Open; Super 500: Hylo Open; Super 300: Swiss Open
1	1	Thailand (1)	Rawinda Prajongjai	1 Super 100: Orleans Masters		4 Super 1000: Denmark Open, Indonesia Open; Super 500: Hylo Open; Super 300: Swiss Open
2	2	Japan (1)	Nami Matsuyama	2 Super 1000: Indonesia Open; Super 750: Indonesia Masters		2 Super 1000: All England Open; Super 750: French Open
2	2	Japan (1)	Chiharu Shida	2 Super 1000: Indonesia Open; Super 750: Indonesia Masters		2 Super 1000: All England Open; Super 750: French Open
3	3	Bulgaria (1)	Gabriela Stoeva		2 Super 300: Swiss Open; Super 100: Orleans Masters	
3	3	Bulgaria (1)	Stefani Stoeva		2 Super 300: Swiss Open; Super 100: Orleans Masters	
4	4	South Korea (1)	Kim So-yeong		1 Super 750: French Open	2 Super 1000: Denmark Open; Super 750: Indonesia Masters
4	4	South Korea (1)	Kong Hee-yong		1 Super 750: French Open	2 Super 1000: Denmark Open; Super 750: Indonesia Masters
	5	Malaysia (1)	Pearly Tan	1 Super 300: Swiss Open		
	5	Malaysia (1)	Thinaah Muralitharan	1 Super 300: Swiss Open		
	6	England (1)	Chloe Birch			
	6	England (1)	Lauren Smith			
	7	India (1)	Ashwini Ponnappa			1 Super 100: Orleans Masters
	7	India (1)	N. Sikki Reddy			1 Super 100: Orleans Masters
Olympic gold medalists
	13	Indonesia (1)	Greysia Polii		1 Super 1000: Indonesia Open	
	13	Indonesia (1)	Apriyani Rahayu		1 Super 1000: Indonesia Open	

Mixed doubles

Seeds	Rank	NOCs	Players	Performances		
Seeds	Rank	NOCs	Players	Winner(s)	Runner(s)-up	Semi-finalists
Qualified by BWF World Tour rankings
1	1	Japan (1)	Yuta Watanabe	3: Super 1000: All England Open, Denmark Open; Super 750: French Open	1: Super 1000: Indonesia Open	1: Super 750: Indonesia Masters
1	1	Japan (1)	Arisa Higashino	3: Super 1000: All England Open, Denmark Open; Super 750: French Open	1: Super 1000: Indonesia Open	1: Super 750: Indonesia Masters
2	2	Thailand (1)	Dechapol Puavaranukroh	3: Super 1000: Indonesia Open; Super 750: Indonesia Masters; Super 500: Hylo Open	1: Super 1000: Denmark Open	1: Super 750: French Open
2	2	Thailand (1)	Sapsiree Taerattanachai	3: Super 1000: Indonesia Open; Super 750: Indonesia Masters; Super 500: Hylo Open	1: Super 1000: Denmark Open	1: Super 750: French Open
3	3	Denmark (1)	Mathias Christiansen	1: Super 100: Orleans Masters	2: Super 750: French Open; Super 300: Swiss Open	1: Super 1000: Indonesia Open
3	3	Denmark (1)	Alexandra Bøje	1: Super 100: Orleans Masters	2: Super 750: French Open; Super 300: Swiss Open	1: Super 1000: Indonesia Open
4	4	England (1)	Marcus Ellis			2: Super 1000: All England Open; Super 300: Swiss Open
4	4	England (1)	Lauren Smith			2: Super 1000: All England Open; Super 300: Swiss Open
	5	Malaysia (1)	Tan Kian Meng			1: Super 300: Swiss Open
	5	Malaysia (1)	Lai Pei Jing			1: Super 300: Swiss Open
	6	Malaysia (2)	Chan Peng Soon			1: Super 1000: All England Open
	6	Malaysia (2)	Goh Liu Ying			1: Super 1000: All England Open
	7	Hong Kong (1)	Tang Chun Man		1: Super 750: Indonesia Masters	1: Super 750: French Open
	7	Hong Kong (1)	Tse Ying Suet		1: Super 750: Indonesia Masters	1: Super 750: French Open
	9	Indonesia (1)	Praveen Jordan		1: Super 500: Hylo Open	1: Super 1000: Denmark Open
	9	Indonesia (1)	Melati Daeva Oktavianti		1: Super 500: Hylo Open	1: Super 1000: Denmark Open

=== Representatives by nation ===
Rank	Nation	MS	WS	MD	WD	XD	Total	Players
1	Malaysia	1		1	1	2	5	9
2	Japan	1	1	1	1	1	5	8
3	Indonesia (H)			2	1	1	4	8
4	Denmark	2	1	1		1	5	7
4	India	2	1	1	1		5	7
4	Thailand	1	2		1	1	5	7
7	England				1	1	2	3^{§}
7	South Korea		1		1		2	3
9	France	1		1			2	2^{§}
10	Bulgaria				1		1	2
10	Chinese Taipei			1			1	2
10	Hong Kong					1	1	2
13	Germany		1				1	1
13	Singapore		1				1	1
Total (14 NOCs)		8	8	8	8	8	40	62

§: Toma Junior Popov of France play in men's singles and men's doubles, while Lauren Smith of England play in women's and mixed doubles.

== Performances by nation ==
Nation	Group stage	Semi-finals	Final	Winner(s)
South Korea	2	2	2	2
Japan	5	4	3	1
Thailand	5	3	2	1
Denmark	5	1	1	1
India	5	2	1	
Indonesia (H)	4	2	1	
Malaysia	5	3		
Bulgaria	1	1		
Chinese Taipei	1	1		
Hong Kong	1	1		
England	2			
France	2			
Germany	1			
Singapore	1			
Total	40	20	10	5

== Men's singles ==
=== Seeds ===
1. (Denmark) Viktor Axelsen (champion)
2. (Malaysia) Lee Zii Jia (semi-finals)
3. (India) Srikanth Kidambi (group stage)
4. (Denmark) Rasmus Gemke (group stage)

=== Group A ===
Pos	Team	Pld	W	L	GF	GA	GD	PF	PA	PD	Pts	Qualification
1	(Denmark) Viktor Axelsen	1	1	0	2	0	+2	42	29	+13	1	Advance to semi-finals
2	(India) Lakshya Sen	1	0	1	0	2	−2	29	42	−13	0	Advance to semi-finals
3	(Denmark) Rasmus Gemke (Z)	0	0	0	0	0	0	0	0	0	0	
3	(Japan) Kento Momota (Z)	0	0	0	0	0	0	0	0	0	0	

Source: TS
(Z) Retired after one match.

Date	Player 1	Score	Player 2	Set 1	Set 2	Set 3
1 December	Viktor Axelsen (Denmark)	0–0	(Denmark) Rasmus Gemke	5–1^{r}		
1 December	Lakshya Sen (India)	0–0	(Japan) Kento Momota	1–1^{r}		
2 December	Viktor Axelsen (Denmark)	2–0	(India) Lakshya Sen	21–15	21–14	
2 December	Rasmus Gemke (Denmark)	N/P	(Japan) Kento Momota	Cancelled		
3 December	Viktor Axelsen (Denmark)	N/P	(Japan) Kento Momota	Cancelled		
3 December	Rasmus Gemke (Denmark)	N/P	(India) Lakshya Sen	Cancelled		

=== Group B ===
Pos	Team	Pld	W	L	GF	GA	GD	PF	PA	PD	Pts	Qualification
1	(Malaysia) Lee Zii Jia	3	3	0	6	0	+6	126	96	+30	3	Advance to semi-finals
2	(Thailand) Kunlavut Vitidsarn	3	2	1	4	3	+1	135	106	+29	2	Advance to semi-finals
3	(India) Srikanth Kidambi	3	1	2	2	4	−2	100	114	−14	1	
4	(France) Toma Junior Popov	3	0	3	1	6	−5	101	146	−45	0	

Source: TS

Date	Player 1	Score	Player 2	Set 1	Set 2	Set 3
1 December	Srikanth Kidambi (India)	2–0	(France) Toma Junior Popov	21–14	21–16	
1 December	Lee Zii Jia (Malaysia)	2–0	(Thailand) Kunlavut Vitidsarn	21–15	21–16	
2 December	Lee Zii Jia (Malaysia)	2–0	(France) Toma Junior Popov	21–13	21–19	
2 December	Srikanth Kidambi (India)	0–2	(Thailand) Kunlavut Vitidsarn	18–21	7–21	
3 December	Lee Zii Jia (Malaysia)	2–0	(India) Srikanth Kidambi	21–19	21–14	
3 December	Toma Junior Popov (France)	1–2	(Thailand) Kunlavut Vitidsarn	12–21	22–20	5–21

=== Finals ===
Semi-finals
1	(Denmark) Viktor Axelsen	21	21
(India) Lakshya Sen	13	11
(Thailand) Kunlavut Vitidsarn	21	21
2	(Malaysia) Lee Zii Jia	18	18

Final
1	(Denmark) Viktor Axelsen	21	21
(Thailand) Kunlavut Vitidsarn	12	8

== Women's singles ==
=== Seeds ===
1. (Thailand) Pornpawee Chochuwong (semi-finals)
2. (Japan) Akane Yamaguchi (semi-finals)
3. (India) P. V. Sindhu (final)
4. (Thailand) Busanan Ongbamrungphan (group stage)

=== Group A ===
Pos	Team	Pld	W	L	GF	GA	GD	PF	PA	PD	Pts	Qualification
1	(Thailand) Pornpawee Chochuwong	3	3	0	6	1	+5	148	124	+24	3	Advance to semi-finals
2	(India) P. V. Sindhu	3	2	1	5	2	+3	131	114	+17	2	Advance to semi-finals
3	(Denmark) Line Christophersen	3	1	2	2	4	−2	113	112	+1	1	
4	(Germany) Yvonne Li	3	0	3	0	6	−6	84	126	−42	0	

Source: TS

Date	Player 1	Score	Player 2	Set 1	Set 2	Set 3
1 December	Pornpawee Chochuwong (Thailand)	2–0	(Germany) Yvonne Li	21–18	21–18	
1 December	P. V. Sindhu (India)	2–0	(Denmark) Line Christophersen	21–14	21–16	
2 December	Pornpawee Chochuwong (Thailand)	2–0	(Denmark) Line Christophersen	22–20	23–21	
2 December	P. V. Sindhu (India)	2–0	(Germany) Yvonne Li	21–10	21–13	
3 December	Line Christophersen (Denmark)	2–0	(Germany) Yvonne Li	21–11	21–14	
3 December	Pornpawee Chochuwong (Thailand)	2–1	(India) P. V. Sindhu	21–12	19–21	21–14

=== Group B ===
Pos	Team	Pld	W	L	GF	GA	GD	PF	PA	PD	Pts	Qualification
1	(Japan) Akane Yamaguchi	2	2	0	4	1	+3	102	87	+15	2	Advance to semi-finals
2	(South Korea) An Se-young	2	1	1	3	2	+1	93	81	+12	1	Advance to semi-finals
3	(Thailand) Busanan Ongbamrungphan	2	0	2	0	4	−4	57	84	−27	0	
4	(Singapore) Yeo Jia Min (Z)	0	0	0	0	0	0	0	0	0	0	

Source: TS
(Z) Retired after two matches.

Date	Player 1	Score	Player 2	Set 1	Set 2	Set 3
1 December	Busanan Ongbamrungphan (Thailand)	0–2	(South Korea) An Se-young	16–21	5–21	
1 December	Akane Yamaguchi (Japan)	~~2–0~~ (voided)	(Singapore) Yeo Jia Min	~~21–11~~	~~21–14~~	
2 December	Busanan Ongbamrungphan (Thailand)	~~1–0~~ (voided)	(Singapore) Yeo Jia Min	~~21–7~~	15–9^{r}	
2 December	Akane Yamaguchi (Japan)	2–1	(South Korea) An Se-young	21–14	18–21	21–16
3 December	Akane Yamaguchi (Japan)	2–0	(Thailand) Busanan Ongbamrungphan	21–18	21–18	
3 December	An Se-young (South Korea)	N/P	(Singapore) Yeo Jia Min	Cancelled		

=== Finals ===
Semi-finals
1	(Thailand) Pornpawee Chochuwong	23	17
(South Korea) An Se-young	25	21
3	(India) P. V. Sindhu	21	15	21
2	(Japan) Akane Yamaguchi	15	21	19

Final
(South Korea) An Se-young	21	21
3	(India) P. V. Sindhu	16	12

== Men's doubles ==
=== Seeds ===
1. (Indonesia) Marcus Fernaldi Gideon / Kevin Sanjaya Sukamuljo (final)
2. (Japan) Takuro Hoki / Yugo Kobayashi (champions)
3. (Denmark) Kim Astrup / Anders Skaarup Rasmussen (group stage)
4. (Malaysia) Ong Yew Sin / Teo Ee Yi (semi-finals)

=== Group A ===
Pos	Team	Pld	W	L	GF	GA	GD	PF	PA	PD	Pts	Qualification
1	(Indonesia) Marcus Fernaldi Gideon (Indonesia) Kevin Sanjaya Sukamuljo	2	2	0	4	1	+3	104	85	+19	2	Advance to semi-finals
2	(Chinese Taipei) Lee Yang (Chinese Taipei) Wang Chi-lin	2	1	1	2	2	0	82	69	+13	1	Advance to semi-finals
3	(Denmark) Kim Astrup (Denmark) Anders Skaarup Rasmussen	2	0	2	1	4	−3	70	102	−32	0	
4	(India) Satwiksairaj Rankireddy (India) Chirag Shetty (Z)	0	0	0	0	0	0	0	0	0	0	

Source: TS
(Z) Walked over after one match.

Date	Pair 1	Score	Pair 2	Set 1	Set 2	Set 3
1 December	Marcus Fernaldi Gideon (Indonesia); Kevin Sanjaya Sukamuljo (Indonesia)	2–0	(Chinese Taipei) Lee Yang (Chinese Taipei) Wang Chi-lin	23–21	21–19	
1 December	Kim Astrup (Denmark); Anders Skaarup Rasmussen (Denmark)	~~2–0~~ (voided)	(India) Satwiksairaj Rankireddy (India) Chirag Shetty	~~21–16~~	~~21–5~~	
2 December	Marcus Fernaldi Gideon (Indonesia); Kevin Sanjaya Sukamuljo (Indonesia)	N/P	(India) Satwiksairaj Rankireddy (India) Chirag Shetty	Walkover		
2 December	Kim Astrup (Denmark); Anders Skaarup Rasmussen (Denmark)	0–2	(Chinese Taipei) Lee Yang (Chinese Taipei) Wang Chi-lin	13–21	12–21	
3 December	Marcus Fernaldi Gideon (Indonesia); Kevin Sanjaya Sukamuljo (Indonesia)	2–1	(Denmark) Kim Astrup (Denmark) Anders Skaarup Rasmussen	21–15	18–21	21–9
3 December	Satwiksairaj Rankireddy (India); Chirag Shetty (India)	N/P	(Chinese Taipei) Lee Yang (Chinese Taipei) Wang Chi-lin	Walkover		

=== Group B ===
Pos	Team	Pld	W	L	GF	GA	GD	PF	PA	PD	Pts	Qualification
1	(Japan) Takuro Hoki (Japan) Yugo Kobayashi	3	3	0	6	0	+6	138	107	+31	3	Advance to semi-finals
2	(Malaysia) Ong Yew Sin (Malaysia) Teo Ee Yi	3	2	1	4	3	+1	146	139	+7	2	Advance to semi-finals
3	(Indonesia) Pramudya Kusumawardana (Indonesia) Yeremia Rambitan	3	1	2	3	4	−1	125	127	−2	1	
4	(France) Christo Popov (France) Toma Junior Popov	3	0	3	0	6	−6	90	126	−36	0	

Source: TS

Date	Pair 1	Score	Pair 2	Set 1	Set 2	Set 3
1 December	Takuro Hoki (Japan); Yugo Kobayashi (Japan)	2–0	(Indonesia) Pramudya Kusumawardana (Indonesia) Yeremia Rambitan	21–14	21–19	
1 December	Ong Yew Sin (Malaysia); Teo Ee Yi (Malaysia)	2–0	(France) Christo Popov (France) Toma Junior Popov	21–16	21–19	
2 December	Ong Yew Sin (Malaysia); Teo Ee Yi (Malaysia)	2–1	(Indonesia) Pramudya Kusumawardana (Indonesia) Yeremia Rambitan	12–21	21–11	21–18
2 December	Takuro Hoki (Japan); Yugo Kobayashi (Japan)	2–0	(France) Christo Popov (France) Toma Junior Popov	21–9	21–15	
3 December	Takuro Hoki (Japan); Yugo Kobayashi (Japan)	2–1	(Malaysia) Ong Yew Sin (Malaysia) Teo Ee Yi	21–19	12–21	21–10
3 December	Christo Popov (France); Toma Junior Popov (France)	0–2	(Indonesia) Pramudya Kusumawardana (Indonesia) Yeremia Rambitan	15–21	16–21	

=== Finals ===
Semi-finals
1	(Indonesia) Marcus Fernaldi Gideon (Indonesia) Kevin Sanjaya Sukamuljo	18	23	21
(Chinese Taipei) Lee Yang (Chinese Taipei) Wang Chi-lin	21	21	17
4	(Malaysia) Ong Yew Sin (Malaysia) Teo Ee Yi	18	15
2	(Japan) Takuro Hoki (Japan) Yugo Kobayashi	21	21

Final
1	(Indonesia) Marcus Fernaldi Gideon (Indonesia) Kevin Sanjaya Sukamuljo	16	21	17
2	(Japan) Takuro Hoki (Japan) Yugo Kobayashi	21	13	21

== Women's doubles ==
=== Seeds ===
1. (Thailand) Jongkolphan Kititharakul / Rawinda Prajongjai (group stage)
2. (Japan) Nami Matsuyama / Chiharu Shida (final)
3. (Bulgaria) Gabriela Stoeva / Stefani Stoeva (semi-finals)
4. (South Korea) Kim So-yeong / Kong Hee-yong (champions)

=== Group A ===
Pos	Team	Pld	W	L	GF	GA	GD	PF	PA	PD	Pts	Qualification
1	(South Korea) Kim So-yeong (South Korea) Kong Hee-yong	3	3	0	6	1	+5	144	110	+34	3	Advance to semi-finals
2	(Indonesia) Greysia Polii (Indonesia) Apriyani Rahayu	3	2	1	4	2	+2	117	98	+19	2	Advance to semi-finals
3	(Malaysia) Pearly Tan (Malaysia) Thinaah Muralitharan	3	1	2	2	4	−2	101	119	−18	1	
4	(Thailand) Jongkolphan Kititharakul (Thailand) Rawinda Prajongjai	3	0	3	1	6	−5	111	146	−35	0	

Source: TS

Date	Pair 1	Score	Pair 2	Set 1	Set 2	Set 3
1 December	Kim So-yeong (South Korea); Kong Hee-yong (South Korea)	2–0	(Malaysia) Pearly Tan (Malaysia) Thinaah Muralitharan	21–14	21–14	
1 December	Jongkolphan Kititharakul (Thailand); Rawinda Prajongjai (Thailand)	0–2	(Indonesia) Greysia Polii (Indonesia) Apriyani Rahayu	15–21	12–21	
2 December	Kim So-yeong (South Korea); Kong Hee-yong (South Korea)	2–0	(Indonesia) Greysia Polii (Indonesia) Apriyani Rahayu	21–15	21–18	
2 December	Jongkolphan Kititharakul (Thailand); Rawinda Prajongjai (Thailand)	0–2	(Malaysia) Pearly Tan (Malaysia) Thinaah Muralitharan	21–23	14–21	
3 December	Pearly Tan (Malaysia); Thinaah Muralitharan (Malaysia)	0–2	(Indonesia) Greysia Polii (Indonesia) Apriyani Rahayu	18–21	11–21	
3 December	Jongkolphan Kititharakul (Thailand); Rawinda Prajongjai (Thailand)	1–2	(South Korea) Kim So-yeong (South Korea) Kong Hee-yong	21–18	20–22	8–21

=== Group B ===
Pos	Team	Pld	W	L	GF	GA	GD	PF	PA	PD	Pts	Qualification
1	(Japan) Nami Matsuyama (Japan) Chiharu Shida	3	3	0	6	0	+6	127	91	+36	3	Advance to semi-finals
2	(Bulgaria) Gabriela Stoeva (Bulgaria) Stefani Stoeva	3	2	1	4	2	+2	110	104	+6	2	Advance to semi-finals
3	(India) Ashwini Ponnappa (India) N. Sikki Reddy	3	1	2	2	5	−3	122	139	−17	1	
4	(England) Chloe Birch (England) Lauren Smith	3	0	3	1	6	−5	111	136	−25	0	

Source: TS

Date	Pair 1	Score	Pair 2	Set 1	Set 2	Set 3
1 December	Nami Matsuyama (Japan); Chiharu Shida (Japan)	2–0	(India) Ashwini Ponnappa (India) N. Sikki Reddy	21–14	21–18	
1 December	Gabriela Stoeva (Bulgaria); Stefani Stoeva (Bulgaria)	2–0	(England) Chloe Birch (England) Lauren Smith	21–12	21–11	
2 December	Nami Matsuyama (Japan); Chiharu Shida (Japan)	2–0	(England) Chloe Birch (England) Lauren Smith	22–20	21–14	
2 December	Gabriela Stoeva (Bulgaria); Stefani Stoeva (Bulgaria)	2–0	(India) Ashwini Ponnappa (India) N. Sikki Reddy	21–19	22–20	
3 December	Nami Matsuyama (Japan); Chiharu Shida (Japan)	2–0	(Bulgaria) Gabriela Stoeva (Bulgaria) Stefani Stoeva	21–9	21–16	
3 December	Chloe Birch (England); Lauren Smith (England)	1–2	(India) Ashwini Ponnappa (India) N. Sikki Reddy	19–21	21–9	14–21

=== Finals ===
Semi-finals
4	(South Korea) Kim So-yeong (South Korea) Kong Hee-yong	w	/	o
3	(Bulgaria) Gabriela Stoeva (Bulgaria) Stefani Stoeva
(Indonesia) Greysia Polii (Indonesia) Apriyani Rahayu	14	21	21
2	(Japan) Nami Matsuyama (Japan) Chiharu Shida	21	13	23

Final
4	(South Korea) Kim So-yeong (South Korea) Kong Hee-yong	21	21
2	(Japan) Nami Matsuyama (Japan) Chiharu Shida	14	14

== Mixed doubles ==
=== Seeds ===
1. (Japan) Yuta Watanabe / Arisa Higashino (final)
2. (Thailand) Dechapol Puavaranukroh / Sapsiree Taerattanachai (champions)
3. (Denmark) Mathias Christiansen / Alexandra Bøje (group stage)
4. (England) Marcus Ellis / Lauren Smith (group stage)

=== Group A ===
Pos	Team	Pld	W	L	GF	GA	GD	PF	PA	PD	Pts	Qualification
1	(Japan) Yuta Watanabe (Japan) Arisa Higashino	3	3	0	6	0	+6	126	76	+50	3	Advance to semi-finals
2	(Malaysia) Chan Peng Soon (Malaysia) Goh Liu Ying	3	2	1	4	3	+1	126	123	+3	2	Advance to semi-finals
3	(Denmark) Mathias Christiansen (Denmark) Alexandra Bøje	3	1	2	3	4	−1	123	135	−12	1	
4	(Malaysia) Tan Kian Meng (Malaysia) Lai Pei Jing	3	0	3	0	6	−6	85	126	−41	0	

Source: TS

Date	Pair 1	Score	Pair 2	Set 1	Set 2	Set 3
1 December	Tan Kian Meng (Malaysia); Lai Pei Jing (Malaysia)	0–2	(Malaysia) Chan Peng Soon (Malaysia) Goh Liu Ying	14–21	13–21	
1 December	Yuta Watanabe (Japan); Arisa Higashino (Japan)	2–0	(Denmark) Mathias Christiansen (Denmark) Alexandra Bøje	21–12	21–15	
2 December	Mathias Christiansen (Denmark); Alexandra Bøje (Denmark)	1–2	(Malaysia) Chan Peng Soon (Malaysia) Goh Liu Ying	17–21	21–19	16–21
2 December	Yuta Watanabe (Japan); Arisa Higashino (Japan)	2–0	(Malaysia) Tan Kian Meng (Malaysia) Lai Pei Jing	21–16	21–10	
3 December	Mathias Christiansen (Denmark); Alexandra Bøje (Denmark)	2–0	(Malaysia) Tan Kian Meng (Malaysia) Lai Pei Jing	21–15	21–17	
3 December	Yuta Watanabe (Japan); Arisa Higashino (Japan)	2–0	(Malaysia) Chan Peng Soon (Malaysia) Goh Liu Ying	21–11	21–12	

=== Group B ===
Pos	Team	Pld	W	L	GF	GA	GD	PF	PA	PD	Pts	Qualification
1	(Thailand) Dechapol Puavaranukroh (Thailand) Sapsiree Taerattanachai	3	3	0	6	2	+4	156	132	+24	3	Advance to semi-finals
2	(Hong Kong) Tang Chun Man (Hong Kong) Tse Ying Suet	3	2	1	5	2	+3	139	115	+24	2	Advance to semi-finals
3	(Indonesia) Praveen Jordan (Indonesia) Melati Daeva Oktavianti	3	1	2	3	4	−1	114	123	−9	1	
4	(England) Marcus Ellis (England) Lauren Smith	3	0	3	0	6	−6	87	126	−39	0	

Source: TS

Date	Pair 1	Score	Pair 2	Set 1	Set 2	Set 3
1 December	Marcus Ellis (England); Lauren Smith (England)	0–2	(Hong Kong) Tang Chun Man (Hong Kong) Tse Ying Suet	11–21	16–21	
1 December	Dechapol Puavaranukroh (Thailand); Sapsiree Taerattanachai (Thailand)	2–1	(Indonesia) Praveen Jordan (Indonesia) Melati Daeva Oktavianti	21–14	10–21	21–11
2 December	Marcus Ellis (England); Lauren Smith (England)	0–2	(Indonesia) Praveen Jordan (Indonesia) Melati Daeva Oktavianti	16–21	13–21	
2 December	Dechapol Puavaranukroh (Thailand); Sapsiree Taerattanachai (Thailand)	2–1	(Hong Kong) Tang Chun Man (Hong Kong) Tse Ying Suet	21–14	20–22	21–19
3 December	Tang Chun Man (Hong Kong); Tse Ying Suet (Hong Kong)	2–0	(Indonesia) Praveen Jordan (Indonesia) Melati Daeva Oktavianti	21–11	21–15	
3 December	Dechapol Puavaranukroh (Thailand); Sapsiree Taerattanachai (Thailand)	2–0	(England) Marcus Ellis (England) Lauren Smith	21–18	21–13	

=== Finals ===
Semi-finals
1	(Japan) Yuta Watanabe (Japan) Arisa Higashino	19	21	21
(Hong Kong) Tang Chun Man (Hong Kong) Tse Ying Suet	21	9	19
(Malaysia) Chan Peng Soon (Malaysia) Goh Liu Ying	8	18
2	(Thailand) Dechapol Puavaranukroh (Thailand) Sapsiree Taerattanachai	21	21

Final
1	(Japan) Yuta Watanabe (Japan) Arisa Higashino	19	11
2	(Thailand) Dechapol Puavaranukroh (Thailand) Sapsiree Taerattanachai	21	21

Preceded by 2021 Indonesia Open	BWF World Tour; 2021 BWF season	Succeeded by 2022 India Open
