= Takuro Hoki =

Japanese badminton player (born 1995)

Takurō Hoki
- Hoki at the 2023 Singapore Open

Personal information
- Born: 14 August 1995 (age 31) Yanai, Yamaguchi Prefecture, Japan
- Height: 1.66 m (5 ft 5 in)
- Weight: 62 kg (137 lb)
- Spouse: Rira Kawashima (m. 2020)

Sport
- Country: Japan
- Sport: Badminton
- Coached by: Lee Wan Wah

Men's & mixed doubles
- Highest ranking: 1 (MD with Yugo Kobayashi, 20 September 2022); 19 (XD with Wakana Nagahara, 9 July 2019)
- Current ranking: 10 (MD with Yugo Kobayashi, 10 November 2026)
- BWF profile
Medal record
Men's badminton
Representing Japan
World Championships
Gold medal – first place	2021 Huelva	Men's doubles
Silver medal – second place	2019 Basel	Men's doubles
Sudirman Cup
Silver medal – second place	2019 Nanning	Mixed team
Silver medal – second place	2021 Vantaa	Mixed team
Bronze medal – third place	2017 Gold Coast	Mixed team
Bronze medal – third place	2023 Suzhou	Mixed team
Bronze medal – third place	2025 Xiamen	Mixed team
Thomas Cup
Bronze medal – third place	2020 Aarhus	Men's team
Bronze medal – third place	2022 Bangkok	Men's team
Asian Games
Bronze medal – third place	2018 Jakarta–Palembang	Men's team
Bronze medal – third place	2022 Hangzhou	Men's team
Asian Championships
Bronze medal – third place	2023 Dubai	Men's doubles
Asia Mixed Team Championships
Gold medal – first place	2017 Ho Chi Minh	Mixed team
Silver medal – second place	2019 Hong Kong	Mixed team
Asia Team Championships
Gold medal – first place	2026 Qingdao	Men's team
Bronze medal – third place	2020 Manila	Men's team
Asian Junior Championships
Bronze medal – third place	2013 Kota Kinabalu	Mixed team

Takuro Hoki (保木 卓朗, Hoki Takurō; born 14 August 1995) is a Japanese badminton player who competes in men's doubles. A former world number one in men's doubles, he is a member of the Japanese national team and plays for the Tonami Transportation team. Partnering with Yugo Kobayashi, Hoki has achieved multiple historic milestones for Japanese badminton. They became the first Japanese men's doubles pair to win the World Championships, securing gold in 2021 after a silver-medal finish in 2019. The duo was also the first men's doubles pair from Japan to win the season-ending BWF World Tour Finals (2021) and to attain the world number-one ranking (20 September 2022). Together, they have won multiple BWF World Tour titles and competed at the 2024 Summer Olympics in Paris. In team events, Hoki has helped Japan win silver and bronze medals at the Sudirman Cup, Thomas Cup, and Asian Games. He was also a member of the squads that won gold at the inaugural Asia Mixed Team Championships in 2017, and Japan's first men's team title at the Asia Team Championships in 2026.

== Career ==
=== 2011–2016: Early international career ===
Hoki made his international debut at the 2011 Osaka International, reaching the second round in men's doubles with Keiichiro Matsui. At the 2013 Asian Junior Championships in Kota Kinabalu, he contributed to Japan's bronze medal in the mixed team event and competed in boys' doubles with Yugo Kobayashi and mixed doubles with Wakana Nagahara. Later that year, he made his senior Super Series debut at the Japan Open, reaching the second round with Kobayashi. He concluded his junior career at the 2013 World Junior Championships, helping Japan finish fourth in the mixed team event and reaching the third round of the mixed doubles with Rena Miyaura.

Continuing his men's doubles partnership with Kobayashi, Hoki won his first senior international title at the 2014 USA International. The pair reached the semifinals of both the U.S. Open and the Chinese Taipei Masters in 2015. In 2016, Hoki represented Japan at the Thomas Cup, where the team reached the quarterfinals. He and Kobayashi subsequently won the Spanish International and finished as runners-up at the U.S. Open. Later in the season, they reached the quarterfinals of the Korea Open in September. The following month, at the China Open, they defeated the third seeds Li Junhui and Liu Yuchen in the first round to reach the quarterfinals, where they were eliminated by the Indonesian pair Kevin Sanjaya Sukamuljo and Marcus Fernaldi Gideon.

=== 2017–2019: World Championships silver medal ===
In early 2017, Hoki helped Japan win the inaugural Asia Mixed Team Championships in Ho Chi Minh City and contributed to a bronze medal at the Sudirman Cup in Gold Coast. With Kobayashi, he reached the quarterfinals of the Asian Championships in his first appearance at the tournament and the semifinals of the Korea Open. In mixed doubles, Hoki partnered with Sayaka Hirota, reaching the final of the Japan Open, where they lost to Wang Yilyu and Huang Dongping, and the semifinals of the Hong Kong Open. Hoki and Kobayashi concluded the season with their first appearance at the Super Series Finals, where they were eliminated in the round-robin stage.

At the 2018 Asian Games in Jakarta, Hoki reached the mixed doubles quarterfinals with Koharu Yonemoto and helped Japan win bronze in the men's team, the Japan's first medal in the event in 48 years. In men's doubles, he and Kobayashi finished as runners-up at the Super 500 Korea Open, losing in three games to Hiroyuki Endo and Yuta Watanabe. In the second half of the year, Hoki formed a new mixed doubles partnership with Wakana Nagahara, reaching the quarterfinals of both the French Open and the Hong Kong Open.

In 2019, Hoki helped Japan secure silver medals at the Asia Mixed Team Championships in Hong Kong and the Sudirman Cup in Nanning. On the World Tour, he and Kobayashi reached the semifinals of the Malaysia Open and the Indonesia Open. At the World Championships in Basel, they defeated defending champions Li Junhui and Liu Yuchen in the semifinals before losing to Mohammad Ahsan and Hendra Setiawan in a three-game final, earning the silver medal. In mixed doubles, Hoki and Nagahara reached a career-high world ranking of No. 19 in July and advanced to the quarterfinals of the French Open in October.

=== 2020–2021: World champion and World Tour Finals winner ===
In early 2020, Hoki and Nagahara reached the mixed doubles quarterfinals of the Malaysia Masters, following a second-round victory over the fourth-seeded Thai pair Dechapol Puavaranukroh and Sapsiree Taerattanachai. Later that month, Hoki and Kobayashi reached the men's doubles quarterfinals at the Thailand Masters. Hoki also helped Japan win a bronze medal at the Asia Team Championships in Manila. Following a second-round exit at the All England Open, much of the remaining tournament calendar was suspended due to the COVID-19 pandemic.

After a first-round exit at the 2021 All England Open, Hoki helped Japan win silver at the Sudirman Cup in Vantaa and bronze at the Thomas Cup in Aarhus. In October, he and Kobayashi won their first BWF World Tour title at the Super 1000 Denmark Open, defeating the Kim Astrup and Anders Skaarup Rasmussen in the final. The following month, they won the Super 750 Indonesia Masters by defeating Marcus Fernaldi Gideon and Kevin Sanjaya Sukamuljo, before finishing as runners-up to the same pair at the Super 1000 Indonesia Open.

In December, Hoki and Kobayashi won the season-ending World Tour Finals, again defeating Gideon and Sukamuljo in the final to become the first Japanese men's doubles pair to win the event. Later that month, they claimed the gold medal at the World Championships in Huelva, defeating He Jiting and Tan Qiang in the final and becoming the first Japanese men's doubles pair to win the world title.

=== 2022–2024: World No. 1 and Olympic debut ===
In 2022, Hoki helped Japan win a bronze medal at the Thomas Cup in Bangkok. He and Kobayashi claimed their first title of the season at the Super 500 Thailand Open after their opponents, Fajar Alfian and Muhammad Rian Ardianto, retired during the final. The pair subsequently won the Super 750 Malaysia Open, again defeating Alfian and Ardianto in the final. On 20 September, they became the first Japanese men's doubles pair to attain the world number-one ranking.

In 2023, Hoki and Kobayashi won the Singapore Open, defeating Liang Weikeng and Wang Chang in the final. They also finished as runners-up at both the Japan Open and the Australian Open and earned a bronze medal at the Asian Championships. The pair reached the semifinals of the Indonesia Masters, Malaysia Masters, and China Open. In team events, Hoki helped Japan win bronze medals at both the Sudirman Cup and the Asian Games.

In 2024, Hoki and Kobayashi reached the semifinals of four Super 750 and Super 1000 events: the Malaysia Open, India Open, French Open, and All England Open. They represented Japan at the Summer Olympics in Paris, where they were eliminated in the round-robin stage of the men's doubles event. In November, they advanced to their first final of the year at the Japan Masters, finishing as runners-up to Fajar Alfian and Muhammad Rian Ardianto.

=== 2025–2026 ===
Hoki and Kobayashi began their 2025 season in April, following Kobayashi's recovery from a knee injury. They returned to competition at the Asian Championships, where they were eliminated in the first round. In May, Hoki helped Japan win a bronze medal at the Sudirman Cup in Xiamen. On the World Tour, he and Kobayashi reached the semifinals of the Malaysia Masters and the Korea Open. In October, they secured their first title of the year at the Super 750 Denmark Open. During the tournament, they defeated the Indian duo Satwiksairaj Rankireddy and Chirag Shetty in the semifinals—their first victory over the pair in six years. They claimed the title by overcoming the Indonesian pair Fajar Alfian and Muhammad Shohibul Fikri.

In early 2026, Hoki and Kobayashi reached the quarterfinals of the Malaysia Open and the India Open. The following month, Hoki was part of the Japanese squad that won Japan's first men's team title at the Asia Team Championships in Qingdao. In November, Hoki and Kobayashi reached back-to-back finals at two Super 500 tournaments, finishing as runners-up at both the Korea Open and Japan Masters.

== Personal life ==
Hoki married former NTT East badminton player Rira Kawashima in February 2020. They have three children: a son named Minato (born 8 April 2021), a daughter named Toa (born 9 June 2023), and a third child named Aoto (born 15 April 2026).

== Records ==
- First Japanese men's doubles pair to win gold at the BWF World Championships (2021, partnered with Yugo Kobayashi).
- First Japanese men's doubles pair to win the season-ending BWF World Tour Finals (2021, partnered with Yugo Kobayashi).
- First Japanese men's doubles pair to attain the World No. 1 ranking (20 September 2022, partnered with Yugo Kobayashi).

== Achievements ==
=== World Championships ===
Men's doubles
Year	Venue	Partner	Opponent	Score	Result	Ref.
2019	St. Jakobshalle; Basel, Switzerland	(Japan) Yugo Kobayashi	(Indonesia) Mohammad Ahsan (Indonesia) Hendra Setiawan	23–25, 21–9, 15–21	Silver	
2021	Palacio de los Deportes Carolina Marín; Huelva, Spain	(Japan) Yugo Kobayashi	(China) He Jiting (China) Tan Qiang	21–12, 21–18	Gold	

=== Asian Championships ===
Men's doubles
Year	Venue	Partner	Opponent	Score	Result	Ref.
2023	Sheikh Rashid Bin Hamdan Indoor Hall; Dubai, United Arab Emirates	(Japan) Yugo Kobayashi	(Malaysia) Ong Yew Sin (Malaysia) Teo Ee Yi	16–21, 24–26	Bronze	

=== BWF World Tour (7 titles, 7 runners-up) ===
The BWF World Tour, which was announced on 19 March 2017 and implemented in 2018, is a series of elite badminton tournaments sanctioned by the Badminton World Federation (BWF). The BWF World Tours are divided into levels of World Tour Finals, Super 1000, Super 750, Super 500, Super 300, and the BWF Tour Super 100.

Men's doubles
Year	Tournament	Level	Partner	Opponent	Score	Result	Ref.
2018	Korea Open	Super 500	(Japan) Yugo Kobayashi	(Japan) Hiroyuki Endo (Japan) Yuta Watanabe	21–9, 15–21, 10–21	(silver) Runner-up	
2021	Denmark Open	Super 1000	(Japan) Yugo Kobayashi	(Denmark) Kim Astrup (Denmark) Anders Skaarup Rasmussen	21–18, 21–12	(gold) Winner	
2021	Indonesia Masters	Super 750	(Japan) Yugo Kobayashi	(Indonesia) Marcus Fernaldi Gideon (Indonesia) Kevin Sanjaya Sukamuljo	21–11, 17–21, 21–19	(gold) Winner	
2021	Indonesia Open	Super 1000	(Japan) Yugo Kobayashi	(Indonesia) Marcus Fernaldi Gideon (Indonesia) Kevin Sanjaya Sukamuljo	14–21, 18–21	(silver) Runner-up	
2021	BWF World Tour Finals	World Tour Finals	(Japan) Yugo Kobayashi	(Indonesia) Marcus Fernaldi Gideon (Indonesia) Kevin Sanjaya Sukamuljo	21–16, 13–21, 21–17	(gold) Winner	
2022	Thailand Open	Super 500	(Japan) Yugo Kobayashi	(Indonesia) Fajar Alfian (Indonesia) Muhammad Rian Ardianto	13–4 retired	(gold) Winner	
2022	Malaysia Open	Super 750	(Japan) Yugo Kobayashi	(Indonesia) Fajar Alfian (Indonesia) Muhammad Rian Ardianto	24–22, 16–21, 21–9	(gold) Winner	
2023	Singapore Open	Super 750	(Japan) Yugo Kobayashi	(China) Liang Weikeng (China) Wang Chang	21–13, 21–18	(gold) Winner	
2023	Japan Open	Super 750	(Japan) Yugo Kobayashi	(Chinese Taipei) Lee Yang (Chinese Taipei) Wang Chi-lin	19–21, 13–21	(silver) Runner-up	
2023	Australian Open	Super 500	(Japan) Yugo Kobayashi	(South Korea) Kang Min-hyuk (South Korea) Seo Seung-jae	17–21, 17–21	(silver) Runner-up	
2024	Japan Masters	Super 500	(Japan) Yugo Kobayashi	(Indonesia) Fajar Alfian (Indonesia) Muhammad Rian Ardianto	15–21, 21–17, 17–21	(silver) Runner-up	
2025	Denmark Open	Super 750	(Japan) Yugo Kobayashi	(Indonesia) Fajar Alfian (Indonesia) Muhammad Shohibul Fikri	21–18, 15–21, 21–19	(gold) Winner	
2026	Korea Open	Super 500	(Japan) Yugo Kobayashi	(South Korea) Kim Won-ho (South Korea) Seo Seung-jae	12–21, 22–20, 19–21	(silver) Runner-up	
2026	Japan Masters	Super 500	(Japan) Yugo Kobayashi	(Malaysia) Aaron Tai (Malaysia) Yap Roy King	21–16, 13–21, 15–21	(silver) Runner-up	

=== BWF Superseries (1 runner-up) ===
The BWF Superseries, which was launched on 14 December 2006 and implemented in 2007, was a series of elite badminton tournaments, sanctioned by the Badminton World Federation (BWF). BWF Superseries levels were Superseries and Superseries Premier. A season of Superseries consisted of twelve tournaments around the world that had been introduced since 2011. Successful players were invited to the Superseries Finals, which were held at the end of each year.

Mixed doubles
Year	Tournament	Partner	Opponent	Score	Result	Ref.
2017	Japan Open	(Japan) Sayaka Hirota	(China) Wang Yilyu (China) Huang Dongping	13–21, 8–21	(silver) Runner-up	

BWF Super Series tournament

=== BWF Grand Prix (1 runner-up) ===
The BWF Grand Prix had two levels, the Grand Prix and Grand Prix Gold. It was a series of badminton tournaments sanctioned by the Badminton World Federation (BWF) and played between 2007 and 2017.

Men's doubles
Year	Tournament	Partner	Opponent	Score	Result	Ref.
2016	U.S. Open	(Japan) Yugo Kobayashi	(Denmark) Mathias Boe (Denmark) Carsten Mogensen	11–21, 20–22	(silver) Runner-up	

BWF Grand Prix Gold tournament

=== BWF International Challenge/Series (2 titles) ===
Men's doubles
Year	Tournament	Partner	Opponent	Score	Result	Ref.
2014	USA International	(Japan) Yugo Kobayashi	(Canada) Adrian Liu (Canada) Derrick Ng	21–17, 21–19	(gold) Winner	
2016	Spanish International	(Japan) Yugo Kobayashi	(Denmark) Mathias Christiansen (Denmark) David Daugaard	21–10, 21–6	(gold) Winner	

BWF International Challenge tournament

== Record against selected opponents ==
Record against year-end Finals finalists, World Championships semi-finalists, and Olympic quarter-finalists. Accurate as of 8 November 2026.

=== With Yugo Kobayashi ===
Players	M	W	L	Diff.
(China) Chai Biao & Hong Wei	1	0	1	–1
(China) Chen Boyang & Liu Yi	5	5	0	+5
(China) He Jiting & Tan Qiang	7	2	5	–3
(China) Li Junhui & Liu Yuchen	7	2	5	–3
(China) Liang Weikeng & Wang Chang	10	5	5	0
(China) Liu Cheng & Zhang Nan	5	2	3	–1
(China) Liu Yuchen & Ou Xuanyi	5	2	3	–1
(Chinese Taipei) Chen Hung-ling & Wang Chi-lin	2	2	0	+2
(Chinese Taipei) Lee Jhe-huei & Yang Po-hsuan	5	1	4	–3
(Chinese Taipei) Lee Yang & Wang Chi-lin	9	4	5	–1
(Denmark) Kim Astrup & Anders Skaarup Rasmussen	16	8	8	0
(Denmark) Mathias Boe & Carsten Mogensen	5	1	4	–3
(England) Marcus Ellis & Chris Langridge	1	0	1	–1
(India) Satwiksairaj Rankireddy & Chirag Shetty	7	2	5	–3
(Indonesia) Mohammad Ahsan & Rian Agung Saputro	1	0	1	–1
(Indonesia) Mohammad Ahsan & Hendra Setiawan	6	3	3	0

Players	M	W	L	Diff.
(Indonesia) Fajar Alfian & Muhammad Rian Ardianto	9	4	5	–1
(Indonesia) Marcus Fernaldi Gideon & Kevin Sanjaya Sukamuljo	15	4	11	–7
(Japan) Hiroyuki Endo & Yuta Watanabe	3	2	1	+1
(Japan) Takeshi Kamura & Keigo Sonoda	7	2	5	–3
(Malaysia) Aaron Chia & Soh Wooi Yik	12	9	3	+6
(Malaysia) Goh Sze Fei & Nur Izzuddin	7	3	4	–1
(Malaysia) Goh V Shem & Tan Wee Kiong	2	1	1	0
(Malaysia) Koo Kien Keat & Tan Boon Heong	1	0	1	–1
(Malaysia) Ong Yew Sin & Teo Ee Yi	11	9	2	+7
(Russia) Vladimir Ivanov & Ivan Sozonov	3	0	3	–3
(South Korea) Kang Min-hyuk & Seo Seung-jae	9	3	6	–3
(South Korea) Kim Gi-jung & Kim Sa-rang	1	1	0	+1
(South Korea) Kim Won-ho & Seo Seung-jae	7	0	7	–7
(South Korea) Ko Sung-hyun & Shin Baek-cheol	1	0	1	–1
(Thailand) Bodin Isara & Maneepong Jongjit	1	0	1	–1
(Thailand) Supak Jomkoh & Kittinupong Kedren	3	3	0	+3

=== With Wakana Nagahara ===
Players	M	W	L	Diff.
(China) Wang Yilyu & Huang Dongping	1	0	1	–1
(China) Zhang Nan & Li Yinhui	1	1	0	+1
(China) Zheng Siwei & Huang Yaqiong	3	0	3	–3
(England) Chris Adcock & Gabrielle Adcock	1	0	1	–1
(England) Marcus Ellis & Lauren Smith	1	0	1	–1
(Germany) Mark Lamsfuß & Isabel Lohau	1	1	0	+1
(Hong Kong) Tang Chun Man & Tse Ying Suet	1	0	1	–1

Players	M	W	L	Diff.
(Indonesia) Tontowi Ahmad & Liliyana Natsir	1	0	1	–1
(Indonesia) Praveen Jordan & Melati Daeva Oktavianti	1	0	1	–1
(Japan) Yuta Watanabe & Arisa Higashino	5	2	3	–1
(Malaysia) Chan Peng Soon & Goh Liu Ying	3	0	3	–3
(South Korea) Seo Seung-jae & Chae Yoo-jung	2	0	2	–2
(Thailand) Dechapol Puavaranukroh & Sapsiree Taerattanachai	1	1	0	+1

=== With Sayaka Hirota ===
Players	M	W	L	Diff.
(China) Wang Yilyu & Huang Dongping	1	0	1	–1
(China) Zhang Nan & Li Yinhui	1	0	1	–1
(Germany) Mark Lamsfuß & Isabel Lohau	1	1	0	+1
(Hong Kong) Lee Chun Hei & Chau Hoi Wah	1	1	0	+1
(Indonesia) Praveen Jordan & Debby Susanto	1	0	1	–1
(Japan) Kenta Kazuno & Ayane Kurihara	1	1	0	+1

=== With Koharu Yonemoto ===
Players	M	W	L	Diff.
(China) Wang Yilyu & Huang Dongping	1	0	1	–1
(China) Zheng Siwei & Huang Yaqiong	1	0	1	–1
(Hong Kong) Tang Chun Man & Tse Ying Suet	1	0	1	–1
(Indonesia) Praveen Jordan & Melati Daeva Oktavianti	1	0	1	–1
(Japan) Yuta Watanabe & Arisa Higashino	1	0	1	–1

=== With Ayako Sakuramoto ===
Players	M	W	L	Diff.
(China) Zhang Nan & Zhao Yunlei	1	0	1	–1
