= An Se-young =

South Korean badminton player (born 2002)

An Se-young 안세영
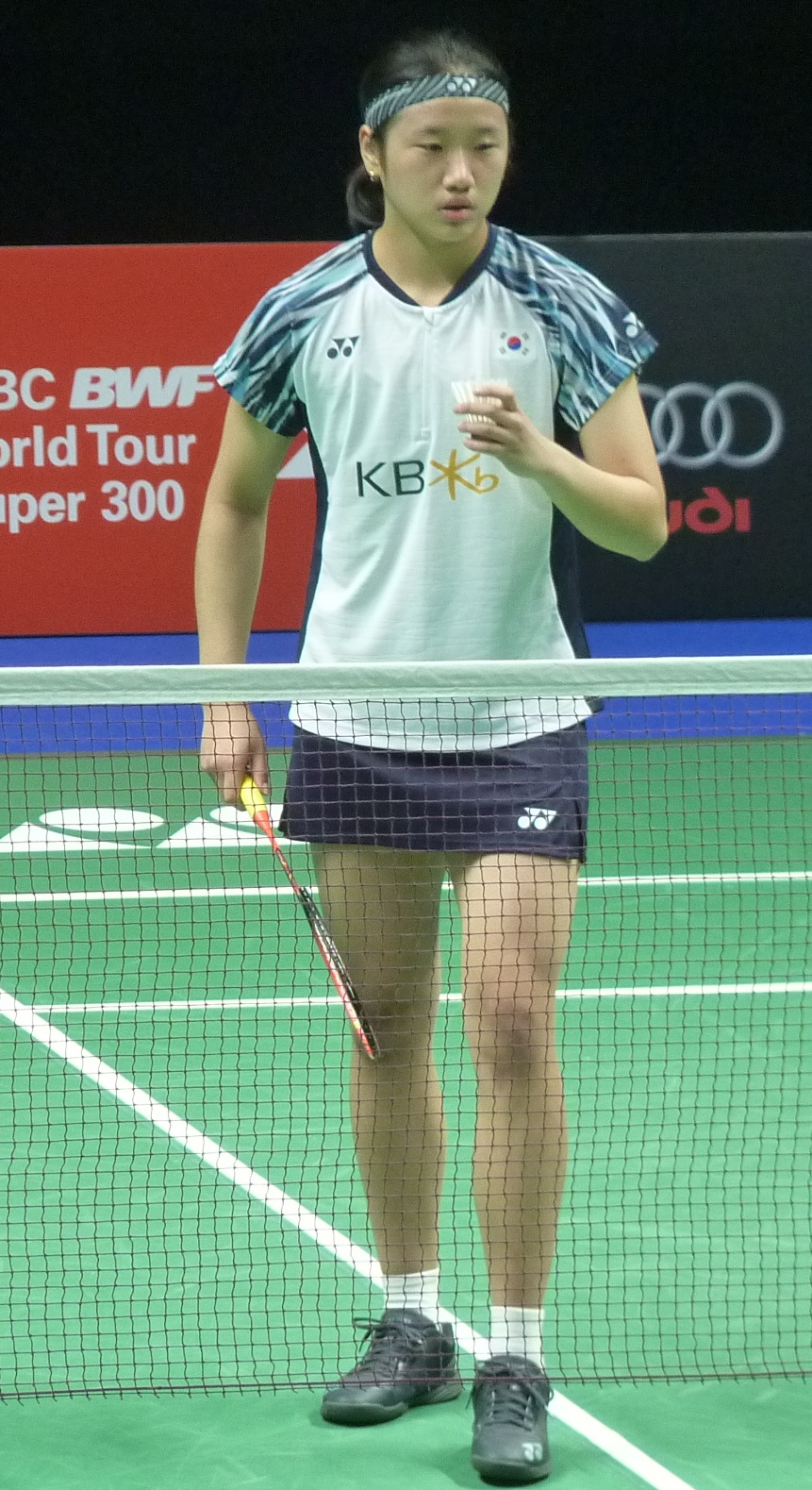
- An in 2022

Personal information
- Born: 5 February 2002 (age 24) Gwangju, South Korea
- Height: 1.70 m (5 ft 7 in)

Sport
- Country: South Korea
- Sport: Badminton
- Handedness: Right
- Coached by: Lee Hyun-il

Women's singles
- Career record: 432 wins, 75 losses
- Highest ranking: 1 (1 August 2023)
- Current ranking: 1 (6 October 2026)
- BWF profile
Medal record
Women's badminton
Representing South Korea
Olympic Games
Gold medal – first place	2024 Paris	Women's singles
World Championships
Gold medal – first place	2023 Copenhagen	Women's singles
Gold medal – first place	2026 New Delhi	Women's singles
Bronze medal – third place	2022 Tokyo	Women's singles
Bronze medal – third place	2025 Paris	Women's singles
Sudirman Cup
Silver medal – second place	2023 Suzhou	Mixed team
Silver medal – second place	2025 Xiamen	Mixed team
Bronze medal – third place	2021 Vantaa	Mixed team
Uber Cup
Gold medal – first place	2022 Bangkok	Women's team
Gold medal – first place	2026 Horsens	Women's team
Bronze medal – third place	2018 Bangkok	Women's team
Bronze medal – third place	2020 Aarhus	Women's team
Bronze medal – third place	2024 Chengdu	Women's team
Asian Games
Gold medal – first place	2022 Hangzhou	Women's singles
Gold medal – first place	2022 Hangzhou	Women's team
Gold medal – first place	2026 Aichi–Nagoya	Women's singles
Bronze medal – third place	2026 Aichi–Nagoya	Women's team
Asian Championships
Gold medal – first place	2026 Ningbo	Women's singles
Silver medal – second place	2023 Dubai	Women's singles
Bronze medal – third place	2022 Manila	Women's singles
Asia Team Championships
Gold medal – first place	2026 Qingdao	Women's team
Silver medal – second place	2020 Manila	Women's team
Bronze medal – third place	2018 Alor Setar	Women's team
World Junior Championships
Bronze medal – third place	2017 Yogyakarta	Mixed team
Asian Junior Championships
Gold medal – first place	2017 Jakarta	Mixed team

An Se-young (Korean: 안세영; Hanja: 安洗瑩; born 5 February 2002) is a South Korean badminton player, who won the gold medal at the 2024 Summer Olympics in the women's singles event. She was named 2019's Most Promising Player of the Year and 2023's Female Player of the Year by the BWF. She won the gold medals at the 2023 and 2026 World Championships, making history as the first Korean women's singles player to win the World Championships title. She then clinched the women's singles gold medal at the 2022 and 2026 Asian Games. An was also a part of South Korea's gold medal winning teams at the 2022 and 2026 Uber Cup as well at the 2022 Asian Games.

In 2018, An was selected to join the national team and became the first junior high school student on the South Korean national team. She was part of the national junior team that won the mixed team title at the 2017 Asian Junior Championships. An later represented her country at the 2018 Uber Cup in Bangkok and Asian Games in Jakarta, helping the team win a bronze medal in the former event. In 2019, she clinched her first BWF World Tour title at the Super 300 New Zealand Open, beating the 2012 Olympic gold medalist Li Xuerui in the final.

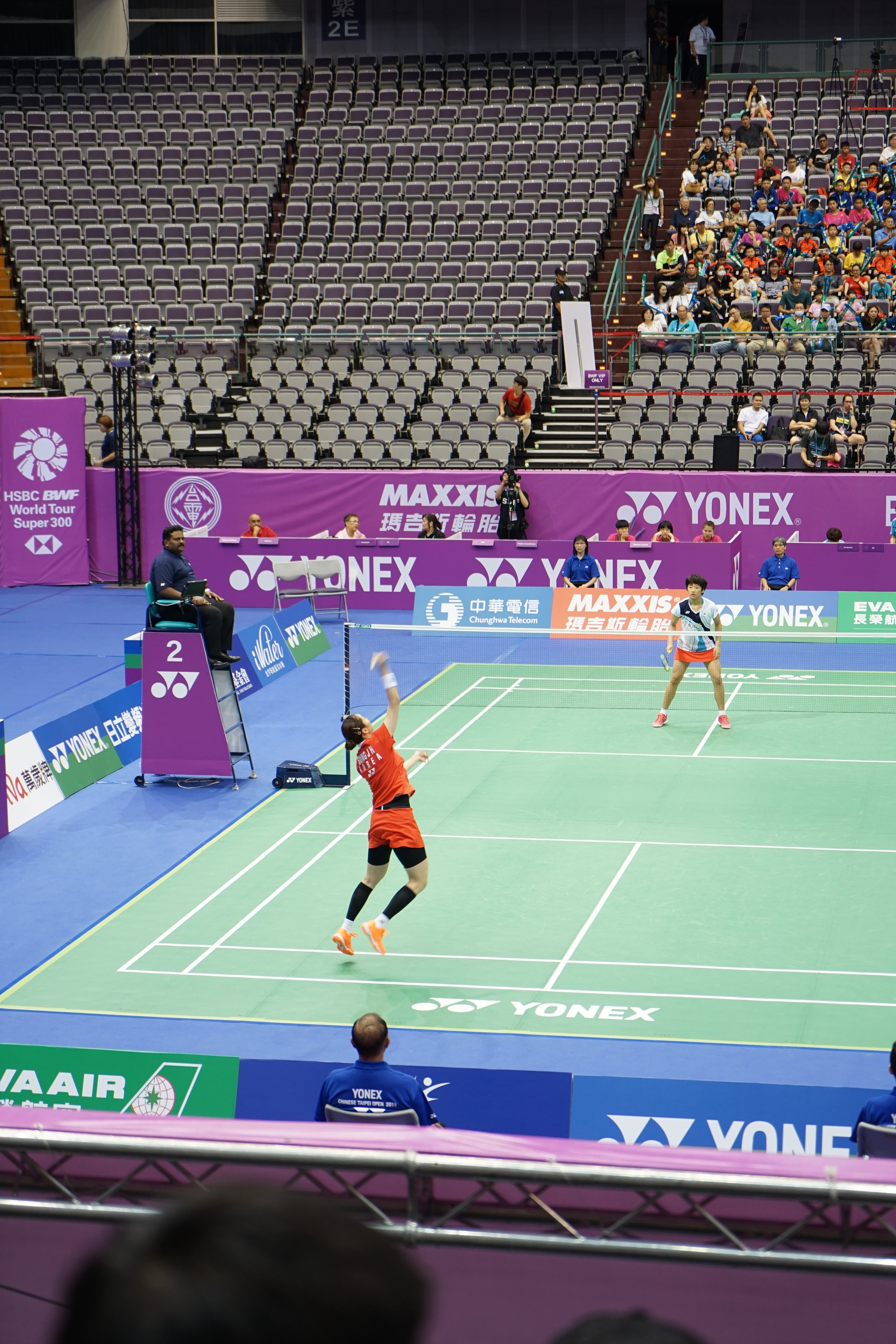
An Se-young against Sung Ji-hyun in the semi-final of 2019 Chinese Taipei Open

== Career ==
An Se-young entered her first international competition when she was only 13 years old, participating in the 2015 Asian Junior Championships where she finished as quarter-finalist in the U15 girls' singles and doubles. An won her first international junior title at the U15 Korea Junior Open in 2015. An increasingly dominated the 2016 U15 junior tournaments, winning the girls' singles title at the Jakarta Open Junior International, Jaya Raya Junior Grand Prix, Asian Junior Championships, and Korea Junior Open; she also won the women's doubles title at the Jaya Raya Junior Grand Prix and the Korea Junior Open.

In 2017, An Se-young competed in the U17 and U19 competitions, where she managed to win the U17 Korea Junior Open, but at the Asian and World Junior Championships, she was unable to win any medals in the individual event. Meanwhile, in the mixed team, An succeeded in helping her team win the Asian junior mixed team title and also won a bronze medal at the World Junior Championships. At the end of the year, An, 15 years old, was selected for the national senior team, becoming the first ever middle school student to join the South Korean national team.

She was then entrusted to strengthen the Korean team at the 2018 Asian Games, but did not manage to win any medals in the individual or team events. In the 2018 Indonesia International Challenge, An managed to reach the final round. She then won her first senior international title at the 2018 Irish Open, beating compatriot Kim Ga-eun in the final.

An Se-young won her maiden World Tour title at the 2019 New Zealand Open, beating the 2012 Olympic gold medalist Li Xuerui of China in the final. Her breakthroughs continued by winning the Canada Open, Akita Masters, French Open, and Korea Masters. The continuously improving performance she displayed in 2019 brought her into the women's singles top 10 in the BWF world rankings. In recognition of her achievements, the BWF awarded her the 2019 Most Promising Player of the Year.

Due to COVID-19, An only participated in five tournaments in 2020, with her best result being runner-up at the Thailand Masters, and together with the national team winning a silver medal at the Asian Women's Team Championship. In 2021, in her debut at the Olympic Games, she was eliminated in the quarter-finals by Chen Yufei. An then made her first final in a Super 1000 tournament, the Denmark Open, but she was unable to finish the match, and had to settle for runner-up to Akane Yamaguchi. At the Indonesia badminton festival held in Bali, An managed to win all three tournaments after in the final she beats Yamaguchi in the Indonesia Masters, Ratchanok Intanon in the Indonesia Open, and P. V. Sindhu in the World Tour Finals.

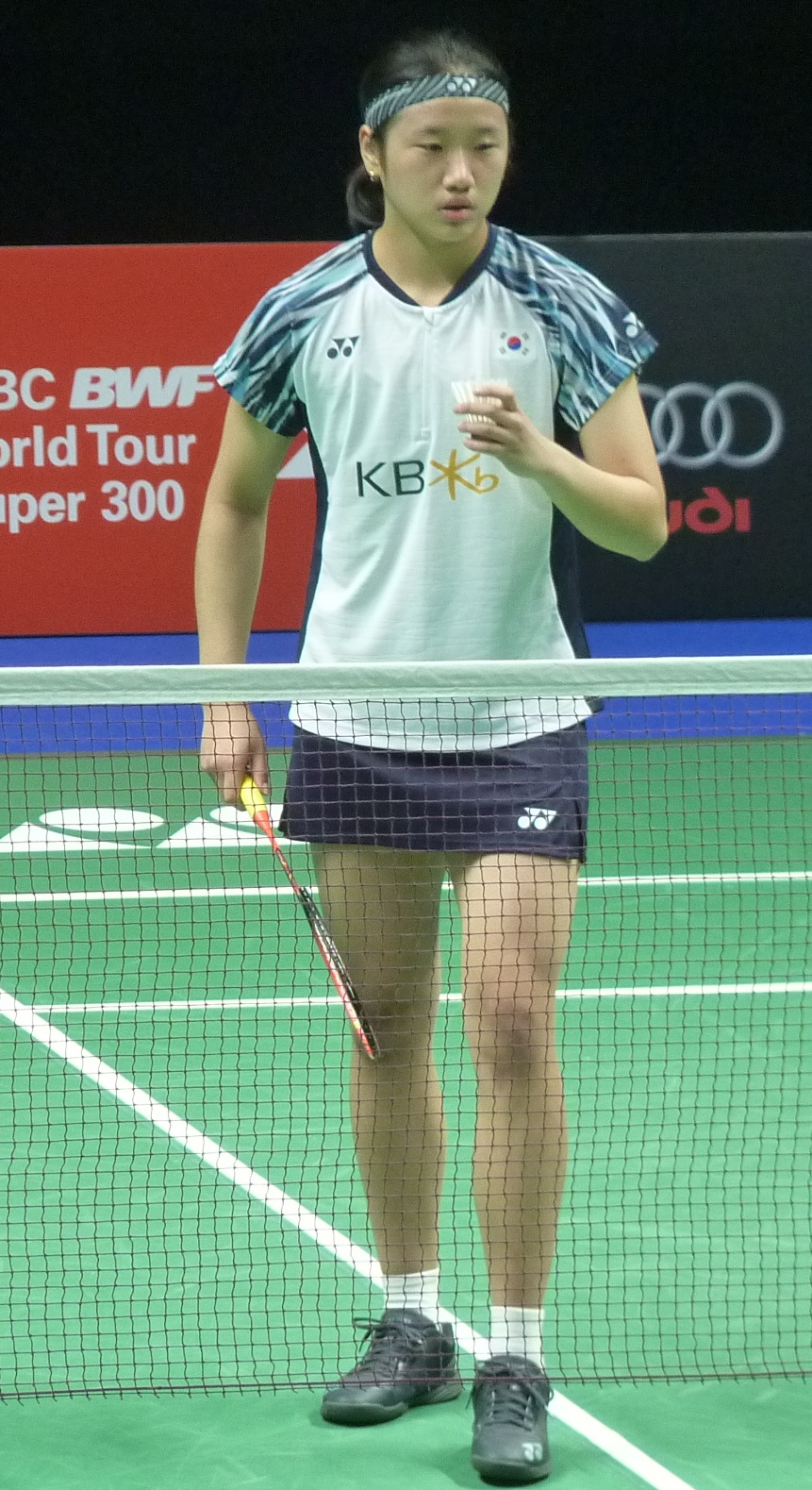
An at the 2022 German Open

In 2022, An reached five finals in the BWF World Tour, winning the Korea Open, Malaysia Masters, and the Australian Open; and also finished as runners-up in the All England and Japan Opens. She also claimed the bronze medals in the women's singles at the Asian and World Championships. Together with the South Korean women's team, she clinched the Uber Cup.

An marked huge milestones for Korean badminton in 2023. She became the first ever Korean women's singles to win the World Championships title in 2023 BWF World Championships, and was the first Korean women's singles to win the Asian Games in 29 years. She also won the gold medal in the women's team at the Asian Games. In the BWF World Tour, she claimed eight titles out of ten finals, and topped the women's singles ranking on 1 August 2023.

In the first half of 2024 season, An played seven individual tournaments, won 3 titles in the Malaysia, French, and the Singapore Opens, and also became finalist in the Indonesia Open. An clinched the gold medal in the women's singles final at the Paris 2024 Olympics, defeating China's He Bingjiao 2–0, marking South Korea's first gold in this event since Bang Soo-hyun's victory in 1996. Following her triumphant gold medal victory at the Paris 2024 Olympics, An Se-young entered a period of both reflection and recovery. After a brief hiatus to address long-standing injury concerns and navigating internal discussions with the Badminton Korea Association (BKA), she made a highly anticipated return to the international circuit at the Denmark Open, where she impressively reached the final and secured the runner-up position. Continuing her post-Olympic momentum, she showcased her unwavering resilience by clinching the title at the China Masters. She concluded her competitive season by finish as the semi-finalist in the World Tour Finals in December. An was honored as the BWF Female Player of the Year for the second year in a row.

A strong performance shown by An in the beginning of the 2025 season, where she emerged champion in the Malaysia and India Opens in January. In the next tournament in March, An is winning a tournament in France, the Orléans Masters. Carrying the momentum of that win, An won the All England Open the next week, gaining her second Super 1000 titles of the year. An continued her pursuit for S1000 "clean sweep" by winning the Indonesia Open in June. The next month, An extended her good form, winning the Japan Open. An lost in two successive semi-finals in China Open and 2025 BWF World Championships after that. An recovered well after those two tournament and snatched her second China Masters title. In October 2025, An was elected as BWF Athletes' Commission. An failed to win in her home tournament Korea Open, but bounced back by snatching both Denmark Open and French Open titles in two consecutive weeks. An broke her own record of most titles in one season for the women's singles in November when she won her tenth title which was Australian Open. An also sealed the season with a World Tour Finals win in December, making it her eleventh title of the year, equalling the long-lasting record of Kento Momota. For her achievements, she also awarded as Women's Singles Player of the Year for the third consecutive time and Women's Player's Player of the Year by the BWF.

An maintained her form into 2026 when she won the Malaysia Open for three consecutive years. She then proceed to win the India Open the next week after. The next month, An became the member of Korean women's badminton team that won the Asia Team Championships for the first time ever. In March, An's 36 match winning streak ended as she lost in the final of All England Open against Wang in straight sets. In April, An won her first Asian Championships title, beating Wang in the final in three games. She then led the Korean team to win the 2026 Uber Cup by defeating China in the final. In May, An won the Singapore Open against Yamaguchi in the final where she battled out from 16–19 score in the third game and gained five straight points with no return to win this tournament for the third time. She carried this momentum into June, capturing the Indonesia Open title by defeating Yamaguchi once again in a thrilling final. Two months later, An did not have any problems at the 2026 BWF World Championships as she beat Han Yue in the quarters, Wang Zhiyi in the semis and defeating Yamaguchi in the final, all in two games. In September, the Korean women's team grabbed the bronze medal after losing 1–3 to Japan in the women's team badminton semi finals despite An's winning effort against Yamaguchi. In the individual event, An managed to defend her title as she beat Yamaguchi once again in 2-0.In the second week of October, An beat Yamaguchi at the final stage once again in the Denmark Open, a win that saw her reached her ninth title of the year and also 47 titles in total, surpassing the previous record of 46 that was set by Susi Susanti. Onto the next week, she continued her hot streak of the year by winning the French Open in three games against the Indian veteran, P. V. Sindhu.

In 2026, An won 66 of her 67 matches and 10 titles, with her only defeat coming in the All England Open final against Wang Zhi Yi.

== Achievements ==
=== Olympic Games ===
Women's singles
Year	Venue	Opponent	Score	Result	Ref.
2024	Porte de La Chapelle Arena, Paris, France	(China) He Bingjiao	21–13, 21–16	Gold	

=== World Championships ===
Women's singles
Year	Venue	Opponent	Score	Result	Ref.
2022	Tokyo Metropolitan Gymnasium, Tokyo, Japan	(Japan) Akane Yamaguchi	19–21, 12–21	Bronze	
2023	Royal Arena, Copenhagen, Denmark	(Spain) Carolina Marín	21–12, 21–10	Gold	
2025	Adidas Arena, Paris, France	(China) Chen Yufei	15–21, 17–21	Bronze	
2026	Indira Gandhi Arena, New Delhi, India	(Japan) Akane Yamaguchi	21–17, 21–14	Gold	

=== Asian Games ===
Women's singles
Year	Venue	Opponent	Score	Result	Ref.
2022	Binjiang Gymnasium, Hangzhou, China	(China) Chen Yufei	21–18, 17–21, 21–8	Gold	
2026	Ichinomiya City Municipal Gymnasium, Ichinomiya, Japan	(Japan) Akane Yamaguchi	21–17, 21–9	Gold	

=== Asian Championships ===
Women's singles
Year	Venue	Opponent	Score	Result	Ref.
2022	Muntinlupa Sports Complex, Metro Manila, Philippines	(China) Wang Zhiyi	21–10, 12–21, 16–21	Bronze	
2023	Sheikh Rashid Bin Hamdan Indoor Hall, Dubai, United Arab Emirates	(Chinese Taipei) Tai Tzu-ying	10–21, 14–21	Silver	
2026	Ningbo Olympic Sports Center Gymnasium, Ningbo, China	(China) Wang Zhiyi	21–12, 17–21, 21–18	Gold	

=== BWF World Tour (42 titles, 11 runners-up) ===
The BWF World Tour, which was announced on 19 March 2017 and implemented in 2018, is a series of elite badminton tournaments sanctioned by the Badminton World Federation (BWF). The BWF World Tour is divided into levels of World Tour Finals, Super 1000, Super 750, Super 500, Super 300, and the BWF Tour Super 100.

Women's singles
Year	Tournament	Level	Opponent	Score	Result	Ref.
2019	New Zealand Open	Super 300	(China) Li Xuerui	21–19, 21–15	(gold) Winner	
2019	Canada Open	Super 100	(China) Wang Zhiyi	21–15, 22–20	(gold) Winner	
2019	Hyderabad Open	Super 100	(Singapore) Yeo Jia Min	21–12, 17–21, 19–21	(silver) Runner-up	
2019	Akita Masters	Super 100	(Japan) Haruko Suzuki	21–10, 17–21, 21–14	(gold) Winner	
2019	French Open	Super 750	(Spain) Carolina Marín	16–21, 21–18, 21–5	(gold) Winner	
2019	Korea Masters	Super 300	(South Korea) Sung Ji-hyun	21–13, 21–17	(gold) Winner	
2020	Thailand Masters	Super 300	(Japan) Akane Yamaguchi	16–21, 20–22	(silver) Runner-up	
2021	Denmark Open	Super 1000	(Japan) Akane Yamaguchi	21–18, 23–25, 5–16 retired	(silver) Runner-up	
2021	Indonesia Masters	Super 750	(Japan) Akane Yamaguchi	21–17, 21–19	(gold) Winner	
2021	Indonesia Open	Super 1000	(Thailand) Ratchanok Intanon	21–17, 22–20	(gold) Winner	
2021	BWF World Tour Finals	World Tour Finals	(India) P. V. Sindhu	21–16, 21–12	(gold) Winner	
2022	All England Open	Super 1000	(Japan) Akane Yamaguchi	15–21, 15–21	(silver) Runner-up	
2022	Korea Open	Super 500	(Thailand) Pornpawee Chochuwong	21–17, 21–18	(gold) Winner	
2022	Malaysia Masters	Super 500	(China) Chen Yufei	21–17, 21–5	(gold) Winner	
2022	Japan Open	Super 750	(Japan) Akane Yamaguchi	9–21, 15–21	(silver) Runner-up	
2022	Australian Open	Super 300	(Indonesia) Gregoria Mariska Tunjung	21–17, 21–9	(gold) Winner	
2023	Malaysia Open	Super 1000	(Japan) Akane Yamaguchi	21–12, 19–21, 11–21	(silver) Runner-up	
2023	India Open	Super 750	(Japan) Akane Yamaguchi	15–21, 21–16, 21–12	(gold) Winner	
2023	Indonesia Masters	Super 500	(Spain) Carolina Marín	18–21, 21–18, 21–13	(gold) Winner	
2023	German Open	Super 300	(Japan) Akane Yamaguchi	11–21, 14–21	(silver) Runner-up	
2023	All England Open	Super 1000	(China) Chen Yufei	21–17, 10–21, 21–19	(gold) Winner	
2023	Thailand Open	Super 500	(China) He Bingjiao	21–10, 21–19	(gold) Winner	
2023	Singapore Open	Super 750	(Japan) Akane Yamaguchi	21–16, 21–14	(gold) Winner	
2023	Korea Open	Super 500	(Chinese Taipei) Tai Tzu-ying	21–9, 21–15	(gold) Winner	
2023	Japan Open	Super 750	(China) He Bingjiao	21–15, 21–11	(gold) Winner	
2023	China Open	Super 1000	(Japan) Akane Yamaguchi	21–10, 21–19	(gold) Winner	
2024	Malaysia Open	Super 1000	(Chinese Taipei) Tai Tzu-ying	10–21, 21–10, 21–18	(gold) Winner	
2024	French Open	Super 750	(Japan) Akane Yamaguchi	18–21, 21–13, 21–10	(gold) Winner	
2024	Singapore Open	Super 750	(China) Chen Yufei	21–19, 16–21, 21–12	(gold) Winner	
2024	Indonesia Open	Super 1000	(China) Chen Yufei	14–21, 21–14, 18–21	(silver) Runner-up	
2024	Denmark Open	Super 750	(China) Wang Zhiyi	10–21, 12–21	(silver) Runner-up	
2024	China Masters	Super 750	(China) Gao Fangjie	21–12, 21–8	(gold) Winner	
2025	Malaysia Open	Super 1000	(China) Wang Zhiyi	21–17, 21–7	(gold) Winner	
2025	India Open	Super 750	(Thailand) Pornpawee Chochuwong	21–12, 21–9	(gold) Winner	
2025	Orléans Masters	Super 300	(China) Chen Yufei	21–14, 21–15	(gold) Winner	
2025	All England Open	Super 1000	(China) Wang Zhiyi	13–21, 21–18, 21–18	(gold) Winner	
2025	Indonesia Open	Super 1000	(China) Wang Zhiyi	13–21, 21–19, 21–15	(gold) Winner	
2025	Japan Open	Super 750	(China) Wang Zhiyi	21–12, 21–10	(gold) Winner	
2025	China Masters	Super 750	(China) Han Yue	21–11, 21–3	(gold) Winner	
2025	Korea Open	Super 500	(Japan) Akane Yamaguchi	18–21, 13–21	(silver) Runner-up	
2025	Denmark Open	Super 750	(China) Wang Zhiyi	21–5, 24–22	(gold) Winner	
2025	French Open	Super 750	(China) Wang Zhiyi	21–13, 21–7	(gold) Winner	
2025	Australian Open	Super 500	(Indonesia) Putri Kusuma Wardani	21–16, 21–14	(gold) Winner	
2025	BWF World Tour Finals	World Tour Finals	(China) Wang Zhiyi	21–13, 18–21, 21–10	(gold) Winner	
2026	Malaysia Open	Super 1000	(China) Wang Zhiyi	21–15, 24–22	(gold) Winner	
2026	India Open	Super 750	(China) Wang Zhiyi	21–13, 21–11	(gold) Winner	
2026	All England Open	Super 1000	(China) Wang Zhiyi	15–21, 19–21	(silver) Runner-up	
2026	Singapore Open	Super 750	(Japan) Akane Yamaguchi	21–11, 17–21, 21–19	(gold) Winner	
2026	Indonesia Open	Super 1000	(Japan) Akane Yamaguchi	23–21, 21–12	(gold) Winner	
2026	China Masters	Super 750	(Japan) Tomoka Miyazaki	21–17, 21–6	(gold) Winner	
2026	Denmark Open	Super 750	(Japan) Akane Yamaguchi	21–23, 21–14, 21–18	(gold) Winner	
2026	French Open	Super 750	(India) P. V. Sindhu	16–21, 21–11, 21–12	(gold) Winner	
2026	Korea Open	Super 500	(Japan) Akane Yamaguchi	21–12, 15–21, 21–16	(gold) Winner	

=== BWF International Challenge / Series (1 title, 2 runners-up) ===
Women's singles
Year	Tournament	Opponent	Score	Result	Ref.
2018	Indonesia International	(Japan) Shiori Saito	12–21, 13–21	(silver) Runner-up	
2018	Irish Open	(South Korea) Kim Ga-eun	26–24, 21–17	(gold) Winner	
2019	Vietnam International	(Japan) Hirari Mizui	19–21, 11–21	(silver) Runner-up	

BWF International Challenge tournament
BWF International Series tournament
BWF Future Series tournament

== Performance timeline ==
Key

W	Won	F	Finalist	SF	Semi-finalist
QF	Quarter-finalist	#R	Rounds 4, 3, 2, 1	RR	Round-robin stage
Q#	Qualification round	A	Absent	w/d	Withdrew
G	Gold	S	Silver	B	Bronze
NH	Not held	N/A	Not applicable	DNQ	Did not qualify

=== National team ===
- Junior level

Team events	2017	Ref
Asian Junior Championships	G	
World Junior Championships	B	

- Senior level

Team events	2018	2019	2020	2021	2022	2023	2024	2025	2026	Ref
Asia Team Championships	B	NH	S	NH	A	NH	A	NH	G	
Asian Games	QF	NH			G	NH			B	
Uber Cup	B	NH	B	NH	G	NH	B	NH	G	
Sudirman Cup	NH	QF	NH	B	NH	S	NH	S	NH	

=== Individual competitions ===
==== Women's singles ====
- Junior level

Events	2017
Asian Junior Championships	1R
World Junior Championships	4R

- Senior level

Events	2018	2019	2020	2021	2022	2023	2024	2025	2026	Ref
Asian Championships	A		NH		B	S	QF	A	G	
Asian Games	1R	NH			G	NH			G	
World Championships	DNQ		NH	QF	B	G	NH	B	G	
Olympic Games	NH		QF	NH			G	NH		

Tournament	BWF World Tour									Best	Ref
Tournament	2018	2019	2020	2021	2022	2023	2024	2025	2026	Best	Ref
Malaysia Open	A		NH		2R	F	W	W	W	W ('24, '25, '26)	
India Open	A		NH		A	W	QF	W	W	W ('23, '25, '26)	
Indonesia Masters	A		QF	W	2R	W	A			W ('21, '23)	
Thailand Masters	A		F	NH		A				F ('20)	
German Open	A		NH		SF	F	w/d	A		F ('23)	
All England Open	A		1R	A	F	W	SF	W	F	W ('23, '25)	
Ruichang China Masters	A	1R	NH			A				1R ('19)	
Orléans Masters	A		NH	A				W	A	W ('25)	
Thailand Open	A	1R	SF	NH	1R	W	A			W ('23)	
Thailand Open	A	1R	SF	NH	1R	W	A			W ('23)	
Malaysia Masters	A		2R	NH	W	A				W ('19)	
Singapore Open	A		NH		A	W	W	QF	W	W ('23, '24, '26)	
Indonesia Open	A		NH	W	QF	SF	F	W	W	W ('21, '25, '26)	
Australian Open	A		NH		W	w/d	A	W	A	W ('22, '25)	
Macau Open	Q2	w/d	NH				A			Q2 ('18)	
U.S. Open	A	QF	NH			A				QF ('19)	
Canada Open	A	W	NH		A					W ('19)	
Japan Open	A		NH		F	W	A	W	2R	W ('23, '25)	
China Open	A	2R	NH			W	w/d	SF	w/d	W ('23)	
Chinese Taipei Open	A	SF	NH		A					SF ('19)	
Korea Masters	1R	W	NH		SF	A				W ('19)	
China Masters	A	2R	NH			2R	W	W	W	W ('24, '25, '26)	
Denmark Open	A	QF	A	F	A	w/d	F	W	W	W ('25, '26)	
French Open	A	W	NH	SF	A	w/d	W	W	W	W ('19, '24, '25, '26)	
Korea Open	A	1R	NH		W	W	A	F	W	W ('22, '23, '26)	
Japan Masters	NH					SF	A			SF ('23)	
Hong Kong Open	A	2R	NH			A				2R ('19)	
Syed Modi International	A	2R	NH		A					2R ('19)	
World Tour Finals	DNQ		SF	W	RR	SF	SF	W		W ('21, '25)	
Akita Masters	A	W	NH							W ('19)	
Hyderabad Open	QF	F	NH							F ('19)	
New Zealand Open	A	W	NH							W ('19)	
Year-end ranking	99	9	9	4	4	1	1	1		1	
Tournament	2018	2019	2020	2021	2022	2023	2024	2025	2026	Best	Ref

==== Women's doubles ====
Tournament	BWF World Tour	Best
Tournament	2018	Best
Korea Masters	2R	2R ('18)
Year-end ranking	351	304

== Record against selected opponents ==
Record against year-end Finals finalists, World Championships semi-finalists, and Olympic quarter-finalists. Accurate as of Yonex French Open 2026

Players	Matches	Results		Difference
Players	Matches	Won	Lost	Difference
(China) Chen Yufei	32	18	14	+4
(China) Han Yue	13	11	2	+9
(China) He Bingjiao	14	9	5	+4
(China) Li Xuerui	1	1	0	+1
(China) Wang Zhiyi	26	21	5	+16
(China) Zhang Yiman	3	3	0	+3
(Chinese Taipei) Tai Tzu-ying	15	12	3	+9
(Hong Kong) Yip Pui Yin	1	1	0	+1
(India) Saina Nehwal	2	1	1	0
(India) P. V. Sindhu	11	11	0	+11

Players	Matches	Results		Difference
Players	Matches	Won	Lost	Difference
(Indonesia) Gregoria M Tunjung	11	11	0	+11
(Indonesia) Putri Kusuma Wardani	10	10	0	+10
(Japan) Aya Ohori	6	6	0	+6
(Japan) Nozomi Okuhara	7	7	0	+7
(Japan) Akane Yamaguchi	39	24	15	+9
(South Korea) Sung Ji-hyun	5	2	3	–1
(Spain) Carolina Marín	10	6	4	+2
(Thailand) Porntip Buranaprasertsuk	2	2	0	+2
(Thailand) Ratchanok Intanon	16	15	1	+14
(Thailand) Pornpawee Chochuwong	13	13	0	+13
