= Bali International Convention Center =

Coordinates: 8°42′37.2″S 115°10′30.5″E

- Location: Nusa Dua, Badung, Bali, Indonesia

Website
- Official website

Bali International Convention Center or BICC is a convention center located in Nusa Dua, Badung Regency, Bali, Indonesia. Since its inauguration, many important national and international conference, exhibition, fair, indoor sports and musical concerts were held at BICC including the 2007 United Nations Climate Change Conference, Miss World 2013, 2021 BWF World Tour Finals, and the 2022 G20 summit.
