= List of BWF World Tour Super 1000 winners =

Winners of BWF World Tour Super 1000 tournaments

This is a list of winners of tournaments designated as BWF World Tour Super 1000 since the tier was introduced in 2018. Super 1000 is a Level 2 category within the Badminton World Federation (BWF) Grade 2 structure and the highest tier of regular World Tour events, below the season-ending BWF World Tour Finals.

== Winners ==
=== 2018–2022 ===
Season	Tournament	Men's singles	Women's singles	Men's doubles	Women's doubles	Mixed doubles	Ref.
2018	All England Open	(China) Shi Yuqi	(Chinese Taipei) Tai Tzu-ying	(Indonesia) Marcus Fernaldi Gideon (Indonesia) Kevin Sanjaya Sukamuljo	(Denmark) Kamilla Rytter Juhl (Denmark) Christinna Pedersen	(Japan) Yuta Watanabe (Japan) Arisa Higashino	
2018	Indonesia Open	(Japan) Kento Momota	(Chinese Taipei) Tai Tzu-ying	(Indonesia) Marcus Fernaldi Gideon (Indonesia) Kevin Sanjaya Sukamuljo	(Japan) Yuki Fukushima (Japan) Sayaka Hirota	(Indonesia) Tontowi Ahmad (Indonesia) Liliyana Natsir	
2018	China Open	(Indonesia) Anthony Sinisuka Ginting	(Spain) Carolina Marín	(Denmark) Kim Astrup (Denmark) Anders Skaarup Rasmussen	(Japan) Misaki Matsutomo (Japan) Ayaka Takahashi	(China) Zheng Siwei (China) Huang Yaqiong	
2019	All England Open	(Japan) Kento Momota	(China) Chen Yufei	(Indonesia) Mohammad Ahsan (Indonesia) Hendra Setiawan	(China) Chen Qingchen (China) Jia Yifan	(China) Zheng Siwei (China) Huang Yaqiong	
2019	Indonesia Open	(Chinese Taipei) Chou Tien-chen	(Japan) Akane Yamaguchi	(Indonesia) Marcus Fernaldi Gideon (Indonesia) Kevin Sanjaya Sukamuljo	(Japan) Yuki Fukushima (Japan) Sayaka Hirota	(China) Zheng Siwei (China) Huang Yaqiong	
2019	China Open	(Japan) Kento Momota	(Spain) Carolina Marín	(Indonesia) Marcus Fernaldi Gideon (Indonesia) Kevin Sanjaya Sukamuljo	(China) Chen Qingchen (China) Jia Yifan	(China) Zheng Siwei (China) Huang Yaqiong	
2020	All England Open	(Denmark) Viktor Axelsen	(Chinese Taipei) Tai Tzu-ying	(Japan) Hiroyuki Endo (Japan) Yuta Watanabe	(Japan) Yuki Fukushima (Japan) Sayaka Hirota	(Indonesia) Praveen Jordan (Indonesia) Melati Daeva Oktavianti	
2020	Thailand Open (I)	(Denmark) Viktor Axelsen	(Spain) Carolina Marín	(Chinese Taipei) Lee Yang (Chinese Taipei) Wang Chi-lin	(Indonesia) Greysia Polii (Indonesia) Apriyani Rahayu	(Thailand) Dechapol Puavaranukroh (Thailand) Sapsiree Taerattanachai	
2020	Thailand Open (II)	(Denmark) Viktor Axelsen	(Spain) Carolina Marín	(Chinese Taipei) Lee Yang (Chinese Taipei) Wang Chi-lin	(South Korea) Kim So-yeong (South Korea) Kong Hee-yong	(Thailand) Dechapol Puavaranukroh (Thailand) Sapsiree Taerattanachai	
2021	All England Open	(Malaysia) Lee Zii Jia	(Japan) Nozomi Okuhara	(Japan) Hiroyuki Endo (Japan) Yuta Watanabe	(Japan) Mayu Matsumoto (Japan) Wakana Nagahara	(Japan) Yuta Watanabe (Japan) Arisa Higashino	
2021	Denmark Open	(Denmark) Viktor Axelsen	(Japan) Akane Yamaguchi	(Japan) Takuro Hoki (Japan) Yugo Kobayashi	(China) Huang Dongping (China) Zheng Yu	(Japan) Yuta Watanabe (Japan) Arisa Higashino	
2021	Indonesia Open	(Denmark) Viktor Axelsen	(South Korea) An Se-young	(Indonesia) Marcus Fernaldi Gideon (Indonesia) Kevin Sanjaya Sukamuljo	(Japan) Nami Matsuyama (Japan) Chiharu Shida	(Thailand) Dechapol Puavaranukroh (Thailand) Sapsiree Taerattanachai	
2022	All England Open	(Denmark) Viktor Axelsen	(Japan) Akane Yamaguchi	(Indonesia) Muhammad Shohibul Fikri (Indonesia) Bagas Maulana	(Japan) Nami Matsuyama (Japan) Chiharu Shida	(Japan) Yuta Watanabe (Japan) Arisa Higashino	
2022	Indonesia Open	(Denmark) Viktor Axelsen	(Chinese Taipei) Tai Tzu-ying	(China) Liu Yuchen (China) Ou Xuanyi	(Japan) Nami Matsuyama (Japan) Chiharu Shida	(China) Zheng Siwei (China) Huang Yaqiong	

=== 2023–2026 ===
Season	Tournament	Men's singles	Women's singles	Men's doubles	Women's doubles	Mixed doubles	Ref.
2023	Malaysia Open	(Denmark) Viktor Axelsen	(Japan) Akane Yamaguchi	(Indonesia) Fajar Alfian (Indonesia) Muhammad Rian Ardianto	(China) Chen Qingchen (China) Jia Yifan	(China) Zheng Siwei (China) Huang Yaqiong	
2023	All England Open	(China) Li Shifeng	(South Korea) An Se-young	(Indonesia) Fajar Alfian (Indonesia) Muhammad Rian Ardianto	(South Korea) Kim So-yeong (South Korea) Kong Hee-yong	(China) Zheng Siwei (China) Huang Yaqiong	
2023	Indonesia Open	(Denmark) Viktor Axelsen	(China) Chen Yufei	(India) Satwiksairaj Rankireddy (India) Chirag Shetty	(South Korea) Baek Ha-na (South Korea) Lee So-hee	(China) Zheng Siwei (China) Huang Yaqiong	
2023	China Open	(Denmark) Viktor Axelsen	(South Korea) An Se-young	(China) Liang Weikeng (China) Wang Chang	(China) Chen Qingchen (China) Jia Yifan	(South Korea) Seo Seung-jae (South Korea) Chae Yoo-jung	
2024	Malaysia Open	(Denmark) Anders Antonsen	(South Korea) An Se-young	(China) Liang Weikeng (China) Wang Chang	(China) Liu Shengshu (China) Tan Ning	(Japan) Yuta Watanabe (Japan) Arisa Higashino	
2024	All England Open	(Indonesia) Jonatan Christie	(Spain) Carolina Marín	(Indonesia) Fajar Alfian (Indonesia) Muhammad Rian Ardianto	(South Korea) Baek Ha-na (South Korea) Lee So-hee	(China) Zheng Siwei (China) Huang Yaqiong	
2024	Indonesia Open	(China) Shi Yuqi	(China) Chen Yufei	(China) Liang Weikeng (China) Wang Chang	(South Korea) Baek Ha-na (South Korea) Lee So-hee	(China) Jiang Zhenbang (China) Wei Yaxin	
2024	China Open	(China) Weng Hongyang	(China) Wang Zhiyi	(Malaysia) Goh Sze Fei (Malaysia) Nur Izzuddin	(China) Li Yijing (China) Luo Xumin	(China) Feng Yanzhe (China) Huang Dongping	
2025	Malaysia Open	(China) Shi Yuqi	(South Korea) An Se-young	(South Korea) Kim Won-ho (South Korea) Seo Seung-jae	(Japan) Yuki Fukushima (Japan) Mayu Matsumoto	(Thailand) Dechapol Puavaranukroh (Thailand) Supissara Paewsampran	
2025	All England Open	(China) Shi Yuqi	(South Korea) An Se-young	(South Korea) Kim Won-ho (South Korea) Seo Seung-jae	(Japan) Nami Matsuyama (Japan) Chiharu Shida	(China) Guo Xinwa (China) Chen Fanghui	
2025	Indonesia Open	(Denmark) Anders Antonsen	(South Korea) An Se-young	(South Korea) Kim Won-ho (South Korea) Seo Seung-jae	(China) Liu Shengshu (China) Tan Ning	(France) Thom Gicquel (France) Delphine Delrue	
2025	China Open	(China) Shi Yuqi	(China) Wang Zhiyi	(Indonesia) Fajar Alfian (Indonesia) Muhammad Shohibul Fikri	(China) Liu Shengshu (China) Tan Ning	(China) Feng Yanzhe (China) Huang Dongping	
2026	Malaysia Open	(Thailand) Kunlavut Vitidsarn	(South Korea) An Se-young	(South Korea) Kim Won-ho (South Korea) Seo Seung-jae	(China) Liu Shengshu (China) Tan Ning	(China) Feng Yanzhe (China) Huang Dongping	
2026	All England Open	(Chinese Taipei) Lin Chun-yi	(China) Wang Zhiyi	(South Korea) Kim Won-ho (South Korea) Seo Seung-jae	(China) Liu Shengshu (China) Tan Ning	(Chinese Taipei) Ye Hong-wei (Chinese Taipei) Nicole Gonzales Chan	
2026	Indonesia Open	(Canada) Victor Lai	(South Korea) An Se-young	(Malaysia) Goh Sze Fei (Malaysia) Nur Izzuddin	(Japan) Yuki Fukushima (Japan) Mayu Matsumoto	(Denmark) Mathias Christiansen (Denmark) Alexandra Bøje	
2026	China Open	(Chinese Taipei) Chou Tien-chen	(Japan) Akane Yamaguchi	(Indonesia) Fajar Alfian (Indonesia) Muhammad Shohibul Fikri	(China) Liu Shengshu (China) Tan Ning	(China) Guo Xinwa (China) Chen Fanghui	

== Records and statistics ==
As of the 2026 China Open

The following statistics are compiled from completed Super 1000 tournaments. In doubles events, each player in a winning partnership is credited with a title.

=== Most titles overall ===
The table below lists players who have won at least six Super 1000 titles across all disciplines.

Rank	Player	Discipline	Titles
1	(Denmark) Viktor Axelsen	Men's singles	10
2	(China) Huang Yaqiong	Mixed doubles	9
2	(China) Zheng Siwei	Mixed doubles	9
2	(South Korea) An Se-young	Women's singles	9
5	(Japan) Yuta Watanabe	Men's and mixed doubles	7
6	(China) Liu Shengshu	Women's doubles	6
6	(China) Tan Ning	Women's doubles	6
6	(South Korea) Seo Seung-jae	Men's and mixed doubles	6

=== Most titles by event ===
These tables display the leading Super 1000 title winners in each of the five disciplines.

==== Men's singles ====
Rank	Player	Titles
1	(Denmark) Viktor Axelsen	10
2	(China) Shi Yuqi	5
3	(Japan) Kento Momota	3
4	(Denmark) Anders Antonsen	2
4	(Chinese Taipei) Chou Tien-chen	2

==== Women's singles ====
Rank	Player	Titles
1	(South Korea) An Se-young	9
2	(Japan) Akane Yamaguchi	5
2	(Spain) Carolina Marín	5
4	(Chinese Taipei) Tai Tzu-ying	4
5	(China) Chen Yufei	3
5	(China) Wang Zhiyi	3

==== Men's doubles ====
Rank	Player	Titles
1	(Indonesia) Fajar Alfian	5
1	(Indonesia) Marcus Fernaldi Gideon	5
1	(Indonesia) Kevin Sanjaya Sukamuljo	5
1	(South Korea) Kim Won-ho	5
1	(South Korea) Seo Seung-jae	5
6	(China) Liang Weikeng	3
6	(China) Wang Chang	3
6	(Indonesia) Muhammad Rian Ardianto	3
6	(Indonesia) Muhammad Shohibul Fikri	3

==== Women's doubles ====
Rank	Player	Titles
1	(China) Liu Shengshu	6
1	(China) Tan Ning	6
3	(Japan) Yuki Fukushima	5
4	(China) Chen Qingchen	4
4	(China) Jia Yifan	4
4	(Japan) Nami Matsuyama	4
4	(Japan) Chiharu Shida	4

==== Mixed doubles ====
Rank	Player	Titles
1	(China) Huang Yaqiong	9
1	(China) Zheng Siwei	9
3	(Japan) Arisa Higashino	5
3	(Japan) Yuta Watanabe	5
5	(Thailand) Dechapol Puavaranukroh	4

=== Career Super 1000 sweeps ===
In badminton coverage, the terms "Super 1000 Grand Slam" or "Super 1000 sweep" describe the achievement of winning every designated Super 1000 tournament within a World Tour cycle in a single discipline over the course of a career. The tables below list players who completed this feat under each World Tour cycle's Super 1000 programme. The years indicate the players' first Super 1000 title at each respective tournament.

==== Three-tournament (2018–2022 cycle) ====
Player	Event	All England Open	Indonesia Open	China Open	Completed at
(China) Huang Yaqiong	Mixed doubles	2019	2019	2018	2019 Indonesia Open
(China) Zheng Siwei	Mixed doubles	2019	2019	2018	2019 Indonesia Open
(Japan) Kento Momota	Men's singles	2019	2018	2019	2019 China Open
(Indonesia) Marcus Fernaldi Gideon	Men's doubles	2018	2018	2019	2019 China Open
(Indonesia) Kevin Sanjaya Sukamuljo	Men's doubles	2018	2018	2019	2019 China Open

==== Four-tournament (2023–2026 cycle) ====
Player	Event	Malaysia Open	All England Open	Indonesia Open	China Open	Completed at
(China) Huang Yaqiong	Mixed doubles	2023	2019	2019	2018	2023 Malaysia Open
(China) Zheng Siwei	Mixed doubles	2023	2019	2019	2018	2023 Malaysia Open
(Denmark) Viktor Axelsen	Men's singles	2023	2020	2021	2023	2023 China Open
(South Korea) An Se-young	Women's singles	2024	2023	2021	2023	2024 Malaysia Open
(China) Shi Yuqi	Men's singles	2025	2018	2024	2025	2025 China Open
(China) Liu Shengshu	Women's doubles	2024	2026	2025	2025	2026 All England Open
(China) Tan Ning	Women's doubles	2024	2026	2025	2025	2026 All England Open
(Japan) Akane Yamaguchi	Women's singles	2023	2022	2019	2026	2026 China Open

=== Season records ===
==== Most titles in a single season ====
The record for the most Super 1000 titles won in the same event during a single season is three. This feat has been achieved eight times by six different players or pairs.

Season	Player	Event	Titles	No. of tournaments	Winning tournaments
2019	(China) Zheng Siwei (China) Huang Yaqiong	Mixed doubles	3	3	All England Open; Indonesia Open; China Open
2020	(Denmark) Viktor Axelsen	Men's singles	3	3	All England Open; Thailand Open (I); Thailand Open (II)
2023	(Denmark) Viktor Axelsen	Men's singles	3	4	Malaysia Open; Indonesia Open; China Open
2023	(China) Zheng Siwei (China) Huang Yaqiong	Mixed doubles	3	4	Malaysia Open; All England Open; Indonesia Open
2025	(China) Shi Yuqi	Men's singles	3	4	Malaysia Open; All England Open; China Open
2025	(South Korea) An Se-young	Women's singles	3	4	Malaysia Open; All England Open; Indonesia Open
2025	(South Korea) Kim Won-ho (South Korea) Seo Seung-jae	Men's doubles	3	4	Malaysia Open; All England Open; Indonesia Open
2026	(China) Liu Shengshu (China) Tan Ning	Women's doubles	3	4	Malaysia Open; All England Open; China Open

==== Season clean sweeps ====
A season clean sweep is achieved when a player or pair wins every completed Super 1000 tournament in the same event during a World Tour season. Sweeps have occurred in three seasons (2019, 2020, and 2022) with 2022 counting as a sweep across only two tournaments after the China Open was cancelled. No other season has produced a clean sweep in any event.

Season	Player	Event	Tournaments	Titles
2019	(China) Zheng Siwei (China) Huang Yaqiong	Mixed doubles	All England Open; Indonesia Open; China Open	3
2020	(Denmark) Viktor Axelsen	Men's singles	All England Open; Thailand Open (I); Thailand Open (II)	3
2022	(Denmark) Viktor Axelsen	Men's singles	All England Open; Indonesia Open	2
2022	(Japan) Nami Matsuyama (Japan) Chiharu Shida	Women's doubles	All England Open; Indonesia Open	2

=== Youngest and oldest champions ===
Liu Shengshu is the youngest overall Super 1000 champion, winning the women's doubles title at the 2024 Malaysia Open at 19 years old. Chou Tien-chen is the oldest overall Super 1000 champion, winning the men's singles title at the 2026 China Open at 36 years old. Players' ages are calculated as of the final day of the tournament at which the record was set.

Event	Youngest champion			Oldest champion		
Event	Player	Age	Tournament	Player	Age	Tournament
Men's singles	(Canada) Victor Lai	21 years, 170 days	2026 Indonesia Open	(Chinese Taipei) Chou Tien-chen	36 years, 199 days	2026 China Open
Women's singles	(South Korea) An Se-young	19 years, 296 days	2021 Indonesia Open	(Spain) Carolina Marín	30 years, 276 days	2024 All England Open
Men's doubles	(Indonesia) Muhammad Shohibul Fikri	22 years, 124 days	2022 All England Open	(Indonesia) Hendra Setiawan	34 years, 197 days	2019 All England Open
Women's doubles	(China) Liu Shengshu	19 years, 281 days	2024 Malaysia Open	(Denmark) Kamilla Rytter Juhl	34 years, 115 days	2018 All England Open
Mixed doubles	(Japan) Yuta Watanabe	20 years, 278 days	2018 All England Open	(Indonesia) Liliyana Natsir	32 years, 302 days	2018 Indonesia Open

Highlighted cells indicate the youngest and oldest Super 1000 champions overall.

== See also ==
- BWF World Tour
- List of BWF Super Series winners
- List of badminton players with the most Superseries, Grand Prix, and World Tour titles
