= 2019 China Open (badminton) =

2019 badminton tournament in Changzhou

Tournament details
- Dates: 17–22 September
- Level: Super 1000
- Total prize money: US$1,000,000
- Venue: Olympic Sports Center Xincheng Gymnasium
- Location: Changzhou, Jiangsu, China

Champions
- Men's singles: (Japan) Kento Momota
- Women's singles: (Spain) Carolina Marín
- Men's doubles: (Indonesia) Marcus Fernaldi Gideon (Indonesia) Kevin Sanjaya Sukamuljo
- Women's doubles: (China) Chen Qingchen (China) Jia Yifan
- Mixed doubles: (China) Zheng Siwei (China) Huang Yaqiong

The 2019 China Open (officially known as the Victor China Open 2019 for sponsorship reasons) was a badminton tournament which took place at Olympic Sports Center Xincheng Gymnasium in Changzhou, Jiangsu, China, from 17 to 22 September 2019 and had a total prize of $1,000,000.

== Tournament ==
The 2019 China Open was the eighteenth tournament of the 2019 BWF World Tour and also part of the China Open championships, which have been held since 1986. This tournament was organized by Chinese Badminton Association and sanctioned by the BWF.

=== Venue ===
This international tournament was held at Olympic Sports Center Xincheng Gymnasium in Changzhou, Jiangsu, China.

=== Point distribution ===
Below is the point distribution table for each phase of the tournament based on the BWF points system for the BWF World Tour Super 1000 event.

| Winner | Runner-up | 3/4 | 5/8 | 9/16 | 17/32 |
|---|---|---|---|---|---|
| 12,000 | 10,200 | 8,400 | 6,600 | 4,800 | 3,000 |

=== Prize money ===
The total prize money for this tournament was US$1,000,000. Distribution of prize money was in accordance with BWF regulations.

| Event | Winner | Finals | Semi-finals | Quarter-finals | Last 16 | Last 32 |
| Singles | $70,000 | $34,000 | $14,000 | $5,500 | $3,000 | $1,000 |
| Doubles | $74,000 | $35,000 | $14,000 | $6,250 | $3,250 | $1,000 |

== Men's singles ==
=== Seeds ===
1. (Japan) Kento Momota (champion)
2. (Chinese Taipei) Chou Tien-chen (quarter-finals)
3. (China) Shi Yuqi (first round)
4. (Indonesia) Jonatan Christie (first round)
5. (China) Chen Long (semi-finals)
6. (Denmark) Viktor Axelsen (first round)
7. (Indonesia) Anthony Sinisuka Ginting (final)
8. (Denmark) Anders Antonsen (semi-finals)

=== Finals ===
Semi-finals
1 | (Japan) Kento Momota | 19 | 21 | 21
5 | (China) Chen Long | 21 | 18 | 16
7 | (Indonesia) Anthony Sinisuka Ginting | 18 | 21 | 21
8 | (Denmark) Anders Antonsen | 21 | 5 | 14

Final
1 | (Japan) Kento Momota | 19 | 21 | 21
7 | (Indonesia) Anthony Sinisuka Ginting | 21 | 17 | 19

=== Top half ===
==== Section 1 ====
First Round
1 | (Japan) K Momota | 21 | 21
(China) Lin D | 14 | 14
(Hong Kong) Wong W K | 10 | 15
(Indonesia) T Sugiarto | 21 | 21
6 | (Denmark) V Axelsen | 21 | 14 | 16
(Japan) K Tsuneyama | 10 | 21 | 21
PFR | (Malaysia) Liew D | 13 | 21 | 21
(Thailand) S Thammasin | 21 | 19 | 15

Second Round
1 | (Japan) K Momota | 21 | 21
(Indonesia) T Sugiarto | 10 | 11
(Japan) K Tsuneyama | 21 | 21
PFR | (Malaysia) Liew D | 12 | 19

Quarter-finals
1 | (Japan) K Momota | 21 | 21
(Japan) K Tsuneyama | 11 | 8

==== Section 2 ====
First Round
4 | (Indonesia) J Christie | 21 | 21 | 10
(Indonesia) S H Rhustavito | 23 | 18 | 21
(Hong Kong) Ng K L | 9 | 21 | 21
PFR | (China) Zhao JP | 21 | 18 | 19
5 | (China) Chen L | 21 | 12 | 23
(Malaysia) Lee Z J | 16 | 21 | 21
(Chinese Taipei) Wang T-w | 21 | 21
(Denmark) H-K Vittinghus | 16 | 19

Second Round
(Indonesia) S H Rhustavito | 10 | 10
(Hong Kong) Ng K L | 21 | 21
5 | (China) Chen L | 21 | 21
(Chinese Taipei) Wang T-w | 10 | 17

Quarter-finals
(Hong Kong) Ng K L | 13 | 13
5 | (China) Chen L | 21 | 21

=== Bottom half ===
==== Section 3 ====
First Round
(India) P Kashyap | 21 | 21
PFR | (France) B Leverdez | 12 | 15
(Japan) K Nishimoto | 14 | 21 | 13
7 | (Indonesia) A S Ginting | 21 | 19 | 21
PFR | (Thailand) S Avihingsanon | 19 | 23 | 14
(India) B. Sai Praneeth | 21 | 21 | 21
(China) Lu GZ | 21 | 21
3 | (China) Shi YQ | 5 | 9

Second Round
(India) P Kashyap | 21 | 21 | 12
7 | (Indonesia) A S Ginting | 23 | 15 | 21
(India) B. Sai Praneeth | 21 | 21
(China) Lu GZ | 19 | 19

Quarter-finals
7 | (Indonesia) A S Ginting | 16 | 21 | 21
(India) B. Sai Praneeth | 21 | 6 | 16

==== Section 4 ====
First Round
(Denmark) R Gemke | 21 | 14 | 21
(Hong Kong) Lee C Y | 13 | 21 | 14
(Netherlands) M Caljouw | 0^{r}
8 | (Denmark) A Antonsen | 2
(China) Huang YX | 21 | 16 | 21
(Thailand) K Wangcharoen | 15 | 21 | 17
(Thailand) K Phetpradab | 12 | 10
2 | (Chinese Taipei) Chou T-c | 21 | 21

Second Round
(Denmark) R Gemke | 11 | 15
8 | (Denmark) A Antonsen | 21 | 21
(China) Huang YX | 19 | 18
2 | (Chinese Taipei) Chou T-c | 21 | 21

Quarter-finals
8 | (Denmark) A Antonsen | 21 | 21
2 | (Chinese Taipei) Chou T-c | 17 | 11

== Women's singles ==
=== Seeds ===
1. (Japan) Akane Yamaguchi (first round)
2. (Chinese Taipei) Tai Tzu-ying (final)
3. (China) Chen Yufei (semi-finals)
4. (Japan) Nozomi Okuhara (first round)
5. (India) P. V. Sindhu (second round)
6. (Thailand) Ratchanok Intanon (quarter-finals)
7. (China) He Bingjiao (quarter-finals)
8. (India) Saina Nehwal (first round)

=== Finals ===
Semi-finals
(Japan) Sayaka Takahashi | 22 | 13 | 18
(Spain) Carolina Marín | 20 | 21 | 21
3 | (China) Chen Yufei | 21 | 13 | 20
2 | (Chinese Taipei) Tai Tzu-ying | 6 | 21 | 22

Final
(Spain) Carolina Marín | 14 | 21 | 21
2 | (Chinese Taipei) Tai Tzu-ying | 21 | 17 | 18

=== Top half ===
==== Section 1 ====
First Round
1 | (Japan) A Yamaguchi | 22 | 17 | 22
(Russia) E Kosetskaya | 20 | 21 | 24
(Thailand) N Jindapol | 21 | 17 | 19
(Japan) S Takahashi | 12 | 21 | 21
6 | (Thailand) R Intanon | 21 | 21
(Denmark) L Kjærsfeldt | 17 | 17
(Hong Kong) Yip P Y | 12 | 13
(China) Chen XX | 21 | 21

Second Round
(Russia) E Kosetskaya | 17 | 15
(Japan) S Takahashi | 21 | 21
6 | (Thailand) R Intanon | 21 | 21
(China) Chen XX | 14 | 11

Quarter-finals
(Japan) S Takahashi | 14 | 21 | 22
6 | (Thailand) R Intanon | 21 | 14 | 20

==== Section 2 ====
First Round
4 | (Japan) N Okuhara | 16 | 18
(Spain) C Marín | 21 | 21
(Indonesia) G M Tunjung | 21 | 19 | 16
(United States) Zhang BW | 14 | 21 | 21
7 | (China) He BJ | 21 | 21
(China) Han Y | 18 | 17
(South Korea) Sung J-h | 21 | 22
(China) Cai YY | 11 | 20

Second Round
(Spain) C Marín | 21 | 21
(United States) Zhang BW | 17 | 12
7 | (China) He BJ | 21 | 21
(South Korea) Sung J-h | 15 | 11

Quarter-finals
(Spain) C Marín | 11 | 21 | 21
7 | (China) He BJ | 21 | 14 | 15

=== Bottom half ===
==== Section 3 ====
First Round
(Thailand) P Chochuwong | 23 | 11 | 21
(Canada) M Li | 21 | 21 | 19
(China) Li XR | 18 | 12
5 | (India) P. V. Sindhu | 21 | 21
PFR | (Germany) Y Li | 4 | 18
(South Korea) An S-y | 21 | 21
(Hong Kong) Deng X | 18 | 9
3 | (China) Chen YF | 21 | 21

Second Round
(Thailand) P Chochuwong | 12 | 21 | 21
5 | (India) P. V. Sindhu | 21 | 13 | 19
(South Korea) An S-y | 22 | 17 | 15
3 | (China) Chen YF | 20 | 21 | 21

Quarter-finals
(Thailand) P Chochuwong | 20 | 13
3 | (China) Chen YF | 22 | 21

==== Section 4 ====
First Round
(South Korea) Kim G-e | 12 | 21 | 21
(Indonesia) Fitriani | 21 | 12 | 13
(Thailand) B Ongbamrungphan | 21 | 21
8 | (India) S Nehwal | 10 | 17
(Hong Kong) Cheung N Y | 9 | 10
(Japan) A Ohori | 21 | 21
(Malaysia) S Cheah S Y | 9 | 16
2 | (Chinese Taipei) Tai T-y | 21 | 21

Second Round
(South Korea) Kim G-e | 19 | 16
(Thailand) B Ongbamrungphan | 21 | 21
(Japan) A Ohori | 19 | 14
2 | (Chinese Taipei) Tai T-y | 21 | 21

Quarter-finals
(Thailand) B Ongbamrungphan | 17 | 10
2 | (Chinese Taipei) Tai T-y | 21 | 21

== Men's doubles ==
=== Seeds ===
1. (Indonesia) Marcus Fernaldi Gideon / Kevin Sanjaya Sukamuljo (champions)
2. (Indonesia) Mohammad Ahsan / Hendra Setiawan (final)
3. (China) Li Junhui / Liu Yuchen (semi-finals)
4. (Japan) Takeshi Kamura / Keigo Sonoda (quarter-finals)
5. (Japan) Hiroyuki Endo / Yuta Watanabe (quarter-finals)
6. (China) Han Chengkai / Zhou Haodong (first round)
7. (Indonesia) Fajar Alfian / Muhammad Rian Ardianto (semi-finals)
8. (Denmark) Kim Astrup / Anders Skaarup Rasmussen (second round)

=== Finals ===
Semi-finals
1 | (Indonesia) Marcus Fernaldi Gideon (Indonesia) Kevin Sanjaya Sukamuljo | 21 | 21
7 | (Indonesia) Fajar Alfian (Indonesia) Muhammad Rian Ardianto | 8 | 16
3 | (China) Li Junhui (China) Liu Yuchen | 20 | 11
2 | (Indonesia) Mohammad Ahsan (Indonesia) Hendra Setiawan | 22 | 21

Final
1 | (Indonesia) Marcus Fernaldi Gideon (Indonesia) Kevin Sanjaya Sukamuljo | 21 | 17 | 21
2 | (Indonesia) Mohammad Ahsan (Indonesia) Hendra Setiawan | 18 | 21 | 15

=== Top half ===
==== Section 1 ====
First Round
1 | (Indonesia) M F Gideon (Indonesia) K S Sukamuljo | 21 | 21
(Japan) T Hoki (Japan) Y Kobayashi | 17 | 15
(South Korea) Ko S-h (South Korea) Shin B-c | 17 | 14
(South Korea) Choi S-g (South Korea) Seo S-j | 21 | 21
6 | (China) Han CK (China) Zhou HD | 19 | 18
(Denmark) M Boe (Denmark) M Conrad-Petersen | 21 | 21
(Netherlands) J Maas (Netherlands) R Tabeling | 6 | 9
(Malaysia) Goh V S (Malaysia) Tan W K | 21 | 21

Second Round
1 | (Indonesia) M F Gideon (Indonesia) K S Sukamuljo | 22 | 18 | 23
(South Korea) Choi S-g (South Korea) Seo S-j | 20 | 21 | 21
(Denmark) M Boe (Denmark) M Conrad-Petersen | 13 | 24 | 25
(Malaysia) Goh V S (Malaysia) Tan W K | 21 | 22 | 27

Quarter-finals
1 | (Indonesia) M F Gideon (Indonesia) K S Sukamuljo | 21 | 21
(Malaysia) Goh V S (Malaysia) Tan W K | 15 | 17

==== Section 2 ====
First Round
4 | (Japan) T Kamura (Japan) K Sonoda | 15 | 21 | 21
(Malaysia) Goh S F (Malaysia) N Izzuddin | 21 | 13 | 16
(India) S Rankireddy (India) C Shetty | 21 | 21
(Canada) J Ho-shue (Canada) N Yakura | 7 | 18
7 | (Indonesia) F Alfian (Indonesia) M R Ardianto | 21 | 21
(Thailand) B Isara (Thailand) M Jongjit | 14 | 11
(Chinese Taipei) Lu C-y (Chinese Taipei) Yang P-ha | 21 | 21
(Chinese Taipei) Liao M-c (Chinese Taipei) Su C-h | 17 | 17

Second Round
4 | (Japan) T Kamura (Japan) K Sonoda | 21 | 21
(India) S Rankireddy (India) C Shetty | 19 | 8
7 | (Indonesia) F Alfian (Indonesia) M R Ardianto | 21 | 21
(Chinese Taipei) Lu C-y (Chinese Taipei) Yang P-ha | 19 | 19

Quarter-finals
4 | (Japan) T Kamura (Japan) K Sonoda | 21 | 20
7 | (Indonesia) F Alfian (Indonesia) M R Ardianto | 23 | 22

=== Bottom half ===
==== Section 3 ====
First Round
(South Korea) Kim G-j (South Korea) Lee Y-d | 22 | 13 | 13
(Malaysia) Ong Y S (Malaysia) Teo E Y | 20 | 21 | 21
(Chinese Taipei) Lee J-h (Chinese Taipei) Yang P-hs | 14 | 11
8 | (Denmark) K Astrup (Denmark) A S Rasmussen | 21 | 21
(Indonesia) W Nayaka (Indonesia) A Yusuf | 22 | 21
(England) M Ellis (England) C Langridge | 20 | 19
(China) He JT (China) Tan Q | 9 | 19
3 | (China) Li JH (China) Liu YC | 21 | 21

Second Round
(Malaysia) Ong Y S (Malaysia) Teo E Y | 21 | 14 | 25
8 | (Denmark) K Astrup (Denmark) A S Rasmussen | 18 | 21 | 23
(Indonesia) W Nayaka (Indonesia) A Yusuf | 21 | 14 | 13
3 | (China) Li JH (China) Liu YC | 19 | 21 | 21

Quarter-finals
(Malaysia) Ong Y S (Malaysia) Teo E Y | 21 | 20 | 20
3 | (China) Li JH (China) Liu YC | 16 | 22 | 22

==== Section 4 ====
First Round
(Chinese Taipei) Lee Y (Chinese Taipei) Wang C-l | 21 | 21
(Russia) V Ivanov (Russia) I Sozonov | 17 | 16
(Malaysia) A Chia (Malaysia) Soh W Y | 14 | 17
5 | (Japan) H Endo (Japan) Y Watanabe | 21 | 21
(Germany) M Lamsfuß (Germany) M E Seidel | 17 | 19
(Japan) T Inoue (Japan) Y Kaneko | 21 | 21
(India) M Attri (India) B. S Reddy | 15 | 15
2 | (Indonesia) M Ahsan (Indonesia) H Setiawan | 21 | 21

Second Round
(Chinese Taipei) Lee Y (Chinese Taipei) Wang C-l | 11 | 11
5 | (Japan) H Endo (Japan) Y Watanabe | 21 | 21
(Japan) T Inoue (Japan) Y Kaneko | 21 | 17 | 16
2 | (Indonesia) M Ahsan (Indonesia) H Setiawan | 18 | 21 | 21

Quarter-finals
5 | (Japan) H Endo (Japan) Y Watanabe | 15 | 12
2 | (Indonesia) M Ahsan (Indonesia) H Setiawan | 21 | 21

== Women's doubles ==
=== Seeds ===
1. (Japan) Mayu Matsumoto / Wakana Nagahara (second round)
2. (Japan) Misaki Matsutomo / Ayaka Takahashi (final)
3. (Japan) Yuki Fukushima / Sayaka Hirota (semi-finals)
4. (China) Chen Qingchen / Jia Yifan (champions)
5. (Indonesia) Greysia Polii / Apriyani Rahayu (quarter-finals)
6. (South Korea) Lee So-hee / Shin Seung-chan (quarter-finals)
7. (China) Du Yue / Li Yinhui (quarter-finals)
8. (Japan) Shiho Tanaka / Koharu Yonemoto (withdrew)

=== Finals ===
Semi-finals
(South Korea) Chang Ye-na (South Korea) Kim Hye-rin | 13 | 25 | 16
4 | (China) Chen Qingchen (China) Jia Yifan | 21 | 23 | 21
3 | (Japan) Yuki Fukushima (Japan) Sayaka Hirota | 17 | 21 | 16
2 | (Japan) Misaki Matsutomo (Japan) Ayaka Takahashi | 21 | 15 | 21

Final
4 | (China) Chen Qingchen (China) Jia Yifan | 21 | 21
2 | (Japan) Misaki Matsutomo (Japan) Ayaka Takahashi | 14 | 18

=== Top half ===
==== Section 1 ====
First Round
1 | (Japan) M Matsumoto (Japan) W Nagahara | 21 | 22 | 21
(China) Dong WJ (China) Feng XY | 15 | 24 | 17
(Chinese Taipei) Hsu Y-c (Chinese Taipei) Hu L-f | 9 | 12
(South Korea) Chang Y-n (South Korea) Kim H-r | 21 | 21
PFR | (Germany) L Efler (Germany) I Herttrich | 16 | 14
(South Korea) Kim S-y (South Korea) Kong H-y | 21 | 21
(Malaysia) V Hoo K M (Malaysia) Yap C W | 12 | 21 | 14
(Thailand) P Supajirakul (Thailand) S Taerattanachai | 21 | 17 | 21

Second Round
1 | (Japan) M Matsumoto (Japan) W Nagahara | 21 | 17
(South Korea) Chang Y-n (South Korea) Kim H-r | 23 | 21
(South Korea) Kim S-y (South Korea) Kong H-y | 21 | 21
(Thailand) P Supajirakul (Thailand) S Taerattanachai | 13 | 13

Quarter-finals
(South Korea) Chang Y-n (South Korea) Kim H-r | 21 | 7 | 24
(South Korea) Kim S-y (South Korea) Kong H-y | 14 | 21 | 22

==== Section 2 ====
First Round
4 | (China) Chen QC (China) Jia YF | 21 | 21
(Malaysia) Chow M K (Malaysia) Lee M Y | 12 | 15
(Bulgaria) G Stoeva (Bulgaria) S Stoeva | 8 | 21 | 21
(Thailand) J Kititharakul (Thailand) R Prajongjai | 21 | 15 | 18
7 | (China) Du Y (China) Li YH | 21 | 21
(South Korea) Baek H-n (South Korea) Jung K-e | 17 | 15
(Canada) R Honderich (Canada) K Tsai | 18 | 21 | 26
(Russia) E Bolotova (Russia) A Davletova | 21 | 17 | 24

Second Round
4 | (China) Chen QC (China) Jia YF | 21 | 21
(Bulgaria) G Stoeva (Bulgaria) S Stoeva | 15 | 15
7 | (China) Du Y (China) Li YH | 21 | 23
(Canada) R Honderich (Canada) K Tsai | 15 | 21

Quarter-finals
4 | (China) Chen QC (China) Jia YF | 21 | 21
7 | (China) Du Y (China) Li YH | 19 | 11

=== Bottom half ===
==== Section 3 ====
First Round
PFR | (Chinese Taipei) Chang C-h (Chinese Taipei) Yang C-t | 11 | 12
(Australia) S Mapasa (Australia) G Somerville | 21 | 21
(China) Liu XX (China) Xia YT | 13 | 17
6 | (South Korea) Lee S-h (South Korea) Shin S-c | 21 | 21
(Netherlands) S Piek (Netherlands) C Seinen | 21 | 21
(France) D Delrue (France) L Palermo | 19 | 13
(Japan) A Sakuramoto (Japan) Y Takahata | 13 | 15
3 | (Japan) Y Fukushima (Japan) S Hirota | 21 | 21

Second Round
(Australia) S Mapasa (Australia) G Somerville | 21 | 16 | 10
6 | (South Korea) Lee S-h (South Korea) Shin S-c | 15 | 21 | 21
(Netherlands) S Piek (Netherlands) C Seinen | 7 | 8
3 | (Japan) Y Fukushima (Japan) S Hirota | 21 | 21

Quarter-finals
6 | (South Korea) Lee S-h (South Korea) Shin S-c | 12 | 16
3 | (Japan) Y Fukushima (Japan) S Hirota | 21 | 21

==== Section 4 ====
First Round
(France) É Lefel (France) A Tran | 20 | 18
(Denmark) M Fruergaard (Denmark) S Thygesen | 22 | 21
(England) C Birch (England) L Smith | 18 | 15
5 | (Indonesia) G Polii (Indonesia) A Rahayu | 21 | 21
(Chinese Taipei) Cheng C-y (Chinese Taipei) Lee C-c | 13 | 8^{r}
(India) A Ponnappa (India) N. S Reddy | 21 | 11
(China) Li WM (China) Zheng Y | 21 | 18 | 8
2 | (Japan) M Matsutomo (Japan) A Takahashi | 16 | 21 | 21

Second Round
(Denmark) M Fruergaard (Denmark) S Thygesen | 14 | 21 | 18
5 | (Indonesia) G Polii (Indonesia) A Rahayu | 21 | 15 | 21
(India) A Ponnappa (India) N. S Reddy | 12 | 17
2 | (Japan) M Matsutomo (Japan) A Takahashi | 21 | 21

Quarter-finals
5 | (Indonesia) G Polii (Indonesia) A Rahayu | 19 | 21 | 16
2 | (Japan) M Matsutomo (Japan) A Takahashi | 21 | 19 | 21

== Mixed doubles ==
=== Seeds ===
1. (China) Zheng Siwei / Huang Yaqiong (champions)
2. (China) Wang Yilyu / Huang Dongping (final)
3. (Japan) Yuta Watanabe / Arisa Higashino (quarter-finals)
4. (Thailand) Dechapol Puavaranukroh / Sapsiree Taerattanachai (semi-finals)
5. (Malaysia) Chan Peng Soon / Goh Liu Ying (second round)
6. (Indonesia) Praveen Jordan / Melati Daeva Oktavianti (first round)
7. (South Korea) Seo Seung-jae / Chae Yoo-jung (semi-finals)
8. (England) Marcus Ellis / Lauren Smith (second round)

=== Finals ===
Semi-finals
1 | (China) Zheng Siwei (China) Huang Yaqiong | 21 | 21
7 | (South Korea) Seo Seung-jae (South Korea) Chae Yoo-jung | 14 | 15
4 | (Thailand) Dechapol Puavaranukroh (Thailand) Sapsiree Taerattanachai | 16 | 10
2 | (China) Wang Yilyu (China) Huang Dongping | 21 | 21

Final
1 | (China) Zheng Siwei (China) Huang Yaqiong | 21 | 13 | 21
2 | (China) Wang Yilyu (China) Huang Dongping | 17 | 21 | 16

=== Top half ===
==== Section 1 ====
First Round
1 | (China) Zheng SW (China) Huang YQ | 21 | 21
(Japan) T Hoki (Japan) W Nagahara | 12 | 12
(France) T Gicquel (France) D Delrue | 14 | 16
(Germany) M E Seidel (Germany) L Efler | 21 | 21
6 | (Indonesia) P Jordan (Indonesia) M D Oktavianti | 20 | 21 | 17
(India) S Rankireddy (India) A Ponnappa | 22 | 17 | 21
(Japan) Y Kaneko (Japan) M Matsutomo | 21 | 21
(Republic of Ireland) S Magee (Republic of Ireland) C Magee | 9 | 7

Second Round
1 | (China) Zheng SW (China) Huang YQ | 21 | 21
(Germany) M E Seidel (Germany) L Efler | 9 | 10
(India) S Rankireddy (India) A Ponnappa | 11 | 21 | 12
(Japan) Y Kaneko (Japan) M Matsutomo | 21 | 16 | 21

Quarter-finals
1 | (China) Zheng SW (China) Huang YQ | 21 | 21
(Japan) Y Kaneko (Japan) M Matsutomo | 15 | 15

==== Section 2 ====
First Round
3 | (Japan) Y Watanabe (Japan) A Higashino | 17 | 21 | 21
(Hong Kong) Tang C M (Hong Kong) Tse Y S | 21 | 17 | 14
(Canada) J Hurlburt-Yu (Canada) J Wu | 11 | 10
(China) He JT (China) Du Y | 21 | 21
7 | (South Korea) Seo S-j (South Korea) Chae Y-j | 21 | 21
(China) Ou XY (China) Feng XY | 14 | 12
(Indonesia) R Rivaldy (Indonesia) P H Mentari | 21 | 16 | 21
(Malaysia) Tan K M (Malaysia) Lai P J | 18 | 21 | 12

Second Round
3 | (Japan) Y Watanabe (Japan) A Higashino | 21 | 21
(China) He JT (China) Du Y | 12 | 10
7 | (South Korea) Seo S-j (South Korea) Chae Y-j | 21 | 21
(Indonesia) R Rivaldy (Indonesia) P H Mentari | 15 | 18

Quarter-finals
3 | (Japan) Y Watanabe (Japan) A Higashino | 17 | 13
7 | (South Korea) Seo S-j (South Korea) Chae Y-j | 21 | 21

=== Bottom half ===
==== Section 3 ====
First Round
(Malaysia) Goh S H (Malaysia) S J Lai | 21 | 19 | 21
(Thailand) N Phuangphuapet (Thailand) S Amitrapai | 16 | 21 | 18
(England) C Adcock (England) G Adcock | 16 | 18
8 | (England) M Ellis (England) L Smith | 21 | 21
(Germany) M Lamsfuß (Germany) I Herttrich | 21 | 23
(India) P Chopra (India) N. S Reddy | 12 | 21
(Indonesia) H Faizal (Indonesia) G E Widjaja | 14 | 19
4 | (Thailand) D Puavaranukroh (Thailand) S Taerattanachai | 21 | 21

Second Round
(Malaysia) Goh S H (Malaysia) S J Lai | 18 | 21 | 22
8 | (England) M Ellis (England) L Smith | 21 | 17 | 20
(Germany) M Lamsfuß (Germany) I Herttrich | 21 | 10 | 11
4 | (Thailand) D Puavaranukroh (Thailand) S Taerattanachai | 19 | 21 | 21

Quarter-finals
(Malaysia) Goh S H (Malaysia) S J Lai | 17 | 16
4 | (Thailand) D Puavaranukroh (Thailand) S Taerattanachai | 21 | 21

==== Section 4 ====
First Round
(Russia) R Alimov (Russia) A Davletova | 13 | 21 | 24
(Indonesia) T Ahmad (Indonesia) W O Kandow | 21 | 16 | 26
(South Korea) Ko S-h (South Korea) Eom H-w | 16 | 10
5 | (Malaysia) Chan P S (Malaysia) Goh L Y | 21 | 21
(Netherlands) R Tabeling (Netherlands) S Piek | 16 | 18
(China) Lu K (China) Chen L | 21 | 21
(Japan) K Gondo (Japan) A Kurihara | 9 | 18
2 | (China) Wang YL (China) Huang DP | 21 | 21

Second Round
(Indonesia) T Ahmad (Indonesia) W O Kandow | 17 | 23 | 21
5 | (Malaysia) Chan P S (Malaysia) Goh L Y | 21 | 21 | 18
(China) Lu K (China) Chen L | 16 | 12
2 | (China) Wang YL (China) Huang DP | 21 | 21

Quarter-finals
(Indonesia) T Ahmad (Indonesia) W O Kandow | 22 | 17
2 | (China) Wang YL (China) Huang DP | 24 | 21

| Preceded by 2019 Vietnam Open | BWF World Tour; 2019 BWF season | Succeeded by 2019 Korea Open |
