= 2022 All England Open =

Badminton tournament in Birmingham

Tournament details
- Dates: 16–20 March
- Edition: 112th
- Level: Super 1000
- Total prize money: US$1,000,000
- Venue: Utilita Arena Birmingham
- Location: Birmingham, England

Champions
- Men's singles: (Denmark) Viktor Axelsen
- Women's singles: (Japan) Akane Yamaguchi
- Men's doubles: (Indonesia) Muhammad Shohibul Fikri (Indonesia) Bagas Maulana
- Women's doubles: (Japan) Nami Matsuyama (Japan) Chiharu Shida
- Mixed doubles: (Japan) Yuta Watanabe (Japan) Arisa Higashino

The 2022 All England Open (officially known as the Yonex All England Open Badminton Championships 2022 for sponsorship reasons) was a badminton tournament that took place at Utilita Arena Birmingham in Birmingham, England, from 16 to 20 March 2022 and had a total prize pool of $990,000.

== Tournament ==
The 2022 All England Open was the fifth tournament of the 2022 BWF World Tour and was part of the All England Open Badminton Championships, which had been held since 1899. The tournament was organized by the Badminton England with sanction from the Badminton World Federation.

=== Venue ===
This tournament took place at Utilita Arena Birmingham in Birmingham, England.

=== Point distribution ===
Below is the point distribution table for each phase of the tournament based on the BWF points system for the BWF World Tour Super 1000 event.

Winner	Runner-up	3/4	5/8	9/16	17/32
12,000	10,200	8,400	6,600	4,800	3,000

=== Prize pool ===
The total prize money was US$1,000,000 with the distribution of the prize money in accordance with BWF regulations.

Event	Winner	Finalist	Semi-finals	Quarter-finals	Last 16	Last 32
Singles	$70,000	$34,000	$14,000	$5,500	$3,000	$1,000
Doubles	$74,000	$35,000	$14,000	$6,250	$3,250	$1,000

== Men's singles ==
=== Seeds ===
1. (Denmark) Viktor Axelsen (champion)
2. (Japan) Kento Momota (quarter-finals)
3. (Denmark) Anders Antonsen (second round)
4. (Chinese Taipei) Chou Tien-chen (semi-finals)
5. (Indonesia) Anthony Sinisuka Ginting (quarter-finals)
6. (Malaysia) Lee Zii Jia (semi-finals)
7. (Indonesia) Jonatan Christie (quarter-finals)
8. (Hong Kong) Ng Ka Long (second round)

=== Finals ===
Semi-finals
1	(Denmark) Viktor Axelsen	21	21
4	(Chinese Taipei) Chou Tien-chen	13	15
(India) Lakshya Sen	21	12	21
6	(Malaysia) Lee Zii Jia	13	21	19

Final
1	(Denmark) Viktor Axelsen	21	21
(India) Lakshya Sen	10	15

=== Top half ===
==== Section 1 ====
First round
1	(Denmark) V Axelsen	22	21
(India) B. Sai Praneeth	20	11
(Netherlands) M Caljouw	21	21
(India) Sa Verma	18	11
5	(Indonesia) A S Ginting	21	21
(India) Parupalli K	11	18
(Thailand) K Wangcharoen	18	14
(India) S Kidambi	21	21

Second round
1	(Denmark) V Axelsen	21	21
(Netherlands) M Caljouw	14	13
5	(Indonesia) A S Ginting	9	21	21
(India) S Kidambi	21	18	19

Quarter-finals
1	(Denmark) V Axelsen	21	21
5	(Indonesia) A S Ginting	4	9

==== Section 2 ====
First round
4	(Chinese Taipei) Chou T-c	21	21
(Indonesia) S H Rhustavito	10	19
(Malaysia) Liew D	21	21
(France) T J Popov	15	19
7	(Indonesia) J Christie	21	16	21
PFR	(France) B Leverdez	9	21	17
(Thailand) K Vitidsarn	21	24
(India) Prannoy K	15	22

Second round
4	(Chinese Taipei) Chou T-c	18	21	21
(Malaysia) Liew D	21	13	9
7	(Indonesia) J Christie	21	21
(Thailand) K Vitidsarn	16	19

Quarter-finals
4	(Chinese Taipei) Chou T-c	21	21
7	(Indonesia) J Christie	10	15

=== Bottom half ===
==== Section 3 ====
First round
(China) Lu GZ	23	21	21
(China) Zhao JP	25	18	16
PFR	(France) T Rouxel	11	19
8	(Hong Kong) Ng K L	21	21
(India) So Verma	17	7
(India) L Sen	21	21
(Singapore) Loh K Y	15	21	13
3	(Denmark) A Antonsen	21	18	21

Second round
(China) Lu GZ	21	21
8	(Hong Kong) Ng K L	10	11
(India) L Sen	21	21
3	(Denmark) A Antonsen	16	18

Quarter-finals
(China) Lu GZ
(India) L Sen	w	/	o

==== Section 4 ====
First round
(Thailand) S Thammasin	21	19	20
(Canada) B Yang	16	21	22
(Japan) K Nishimoto	16	17
6	(Malaysia) Lee Z J	21	21
(Hong Kong) Lee C Y	13	21	16
(South Korea) Heo K-h	21	9	21
(Denmark) H-K Vittinghus	18	7^{r}
2	(Japan) K Momota	21	11

Second round
(Canada) B Yang	24	11
6	(Malaysia) Lee Z J	26	21
(South Korea) Heo K-h	16	12
2	(Japan) K Momota	21	21

Quarter-finals
6	(Malaysia) Lee Z J	21	13	21
2	(Japan) K Momota	7	21	11

== Women's singles ==
=== Seeds ===
1. (Chinese Taipei) Tai Tzu-ying (semi-finals)
2. (Japan) Akane Yamaguchi (champion)
3. (China) Chen Yufei (semi-finals)
4. (South Korea) An Se-young (final)
5. (Japan) Nozomi Okuhara (quarter-finals)
6. (India) P. V. Sindhu (second round)
7. (Thailand) Ratchanok Intanon (withdrew)
8. (China) He Bingjiao (quarter-finals)

=== Finals ===
Semi-finals
1	(Chinese Taipei) Tai Tzu-ying	19	13
4	(South Korea) An Se-young	21	21
3	(China) Chen Yufei	11	13
2	(Japan) Akane Yamaguchi	21	21

Final
4	(South Korea) An Se-young	15	15
2	(Japan) Akane Yamaguchi	21	21

=== Top half ===
==== Section 1 ====
First round
1	(Chinese Taipei) Tai T-y	21	21
(Belgium) L Tan	12	14
PFR	(France) L Huet	9	13
(Thailand) B Ongbamrungphan	21	21
5	(Japan) N Okuhara	21	21
(Denmark) L Christophersen	15	16
PFR	(France) M Batomene	9	13
(China) Han Y	21	21

Second round
1	(Chinese Taipei) Tai T-y	21	22
(Thailand) B Ongbamrungphan	19	20
5	(Japan) N Okuhara	21	21
(China) Han Y	15	18

Quarter-finals
1	(Chinese Taipei) Tai T-y	21	21
5	(Japan) N Okuhara	10	11

==== Section 2 ====
First round
4	(South Korea) An S-y	21	21
(Indonesia) G M Tunjung	16	4
(Scotland) K Gilmour	21	21
(United States) BW Zhang	16	13
PFR	(India) A Kashyap	18	18
(Canada) M Li	21	21
(France) Qi XF	16	21	7
(United States) I Wang	21	12	21

Second round
4	(South Korea) An S-y	21	21
(Scotland) K Gilmour	17	16
(Canada) M Li	15	14
(United States) I Wang	21	21

Quarter-finals
4	(South Korea) An S-y	21	21
(United States) I Wang	12	9

=== Bottom half ===
==== Section 3 ====
First round
(Spain) C Azurmendi	21	21
(Denmark) L Kjærsfeldt	19	11
PFR	(Ukraine) M Ulitina	8	6
8	(China) He BJ	21	21
(Germany) Y Li	15	21	18
(Denmark) J D Jakobsen	21	7	21
(China) Zhang YM
3	(China) Chen YF	w	/	o

Second round
(Spain) C Azurmendi	21	6	9
8	(China) He BJ	16	21	21
(Denmark) J D Jakobsen	10	12
3	(China) Chen YF	21	21

Quarter-finals
8	(China) He BJ
3	(China) Chen YF	w	/	o

==== Section 4 ====
First round
(Japan) S Takahashi	21	23
(Thailand) S Katethong	17	21
(China) Wang ZY	18	13
6	(India) P. V. Sindhu	21	21
PFR	(Spain) B Corrales	17	19
(India) S Nehwal	21	21
PFR	(Estonia) K Kuuba	13	13
2	(Japan) A Yamaguchi	21	21

Second round
(Japan) S Takahashi	21	16	21
6	(India) P. V. Sindhu	19	21	17
(India) S Nehwal	14	21	17
2	(Japan) A Yamaguchi	21	17	21

Quarter-finals
(Japan) S Takahashi	18	7
2	(Japan) A Yamaguchi	21	21

== Men's doubles ==
=== Seeds ===
1. (Indonesia) Marcus Fernaldi Gideon / Kevin Sanjaya Sukamuljo (semi-finals)
2. (Indonesia) Mohammad Ahsan / Hendra Setiawan (final)
3. (Japan) Takuro Hoki / Yugo Kobayashi (quarter-finals)
4. (Malaysia) Aaron Chia / Soh Wooi Yik (second round)
5. (India) Satwiksairaj Rankireddy / Chirag Shetty (quarter-finals)
6. (Indonesia) Fajar Alfian / Muhammad Rian Ardianto (first round)
7. (Denmark) Kim Astrup / Anders Skaarup Rasmussen (quarter-finals)
8. (Malaysia) Ong Yew Sin / Teo Ee Yi (second round)

=== Finals ===
Semi-finals
1	(Indonesia) Marcus Fernaldi Gideon (Indonesia) Kevin Sanjaya Sukamuljo	20	21	16
(Indonesia) Muhammad Shohibul Fikri (Indonesia) Bagas Maulana	22	13	21
(China) He Jiting (China) Tan Qiang	16	21	13
2	(Indonesia) Mohammad Ahsan (Indonesia) Hendra Setiawan	21	14	21

Final
(Indonesia) Muhammad Shohibul Fikri (Indonesia) Bagas Maulana	21	21
2	(Indonesia) Mohammad Ahsan (Indonesia) Hendra Setiawan	19	13

=== Top half ===
==== Section 1 ====
First round
1	(Indonesia) M F Gideon (Indonesia) K S Sukamuljo	21	21
PFR	(France) L Corvée (France) R Labar	12	18
(Japan) A Koga (Japan) T Saito	21	21
(France) C Popov (France) T J Popov	8	14
5	(India) S Rankireddy (India) C Shetty	21	21
(Scotland) A Dunn (Scotland) A Hall	17	19
(Germany) M Lamsfuß (Germany) M Seidel	21	21
(India) K P Garaga (India) V G Panjala	16	19

Second round
1	(Indonesia) M F Gideon (Indonesia) K S Sukamuljo	15	21	21
(Japan) A Koga (Japan) T Saito	21	18	18
5	(India) S Rankireddy (India) C Shetty	21	21
(Germany) M Lamsfuß (Germany) M Seidel	7	7

Quarter-finals
1	(Indonesia) M F Gideon (Indonesia) K S Sukamuljo	24	21
5	(India) S Rankireddy (India) C Shetty	22	17

==== Section 2 ====
First round
3	(Japan) T Hoki (Japan) Y Kobayashi	21	18	23
(Malaysia) Man W C (Malaysia) Tee K W	17	21	21
(England) B Lane (England) S Vendy	21	22
(Malaysia) Tan K M (Malaysia) Tan W K	14	20
8	(Malaysia) Ong Y S (Malaysia) Teo E Y	21	21
(England) C Hemming (England) S Stallwood	14	12
(Indonesia) M S Fikri (Indonesia) B Maulana	21	21
(Indonesia) P Kusumawardana (Indonesia) Y Rambitan	18	19

Second round
3	(Japan) T Hoki (Japan) Y Kobayashi	21	19	24
(England) B Lane (England) S Vendy	11	21	22
8	(Malaysia) Ong Y S (Malaysia) Teo E Y	22	21	17
(Indonesia) M S Fikri (Indonesia) B Maulana	24	13	21

Quarter-finals
3	(Japan) T Hoki (Japan) Y Kobayashi	21	16	20
(Indonesia) M S Fikri (Indonesia) B Maulana	16	21	22

=== Bottom half ===
==== Section 3 ====
First round
(Thailand) S Jomkoh (Thailand) K Kedren	15	12
(China) Liu YC (China) Zhou HD	21	21
(Indonesia) L R Carnando (Indonesia) D Marthin	21	22
6	(Indonesia) F Alfian (Indonesia) M R Ardianto	16	20
(China) He JT (China) Tan Q	21	19	21
(Malaysia) Goh S F (Malaysia) N Izzuddin	15	21	11
PFR	(Scotland) C Grimley (Scotland) M Grimley	14	19
4	(Malaysia) A Chia (Malaysia) Soh W Y	21	21

Second round
(China) Liu YC (China) Zhou HD	22	22	16
(Indonesia) L R Carnando (Indonesia) D Marthin	20	24	21
(China) He JT (China) Tan Q	21	21
4	(Malaysia) A Chia (Malaysia) Soh W Y	15	19

Quarter-finals
(Indonesia) L R Carnando (Indonesia) D Marthin	21	16	14
(China) He JT (China) Tan Q	15	21	21

==== Section 4 ====
First round
(France) F Delrue (France) W Villeger	18	11
(Japan) K Matsui (Japan) Y Takeuchi	21	21
(Netherlands) R Jille (Netherlands) T van der Lecq	13	25	10
7	(Denmark) K Astrup (Denmark) A S Rasmussen	21	23	21
(Denmark) J Bay (Denmark) L Mølhede	22	13
(China) Liu C (China) Zhang N	24	21
(India) Arjun M.R. (India) D Kapila	21	12	18
2	(Indonesia) M Ahsan (Indonesia) H Setiawan	15	21	21

Second round
(Japan) K Matsui (Japan) Y Takeuchi	12	7
7	(Denmark) K Astrup (Denmark) A S Rasmussen	21	21
(China) Liu C (China) Zhang N	21	17	14
2	(Indonesia) M Ahsan (Indonesia) H Setiawan	19	21	21

Quarter-finals
7	(Denmark) K Astrup (Denmark) A S Rasmussen	15	20
2	(Indonesia) M Ahsan (Indonesia) H Setiawan	21	22

== Women's doubles ==
=== Seeds ===
1. (China) Chen Qingchen / Jia Yifan (first round)
2. (South Korea) Lee So-hee / Shin Seung-chan (quarter-finals)
3. (South Korea) Kim So-yeong / Kong Hee-yong (quarter-finals)
4. (Japan) Yuki Fukushima / Sayaka Hirota (first round)
5. (Japan) Mayu Matsumoto / Wakana Nagahara (withdrew)
6. (Indonesia) Greysia Polii / Apriyani Rahayu (second round)
7. (Japan) Nami Matsuyama / Chiharu Shida (champions)
8. (Thailand) Jongkolphan Kititharakul / Rawinda Prajongjai (quarter-finals)

=== Finals ===
Semi-finals
(South Korea) Jeong Na-eun (South Korea) Kim Hye-jeong	8	12
7	(Japan) Nami Matsuyama (Japan) Chiharu Shida	21	21
(China) Zhang Shuxian (China) Zheng Yu	21	21
PFR	(India) Treesa Jolly (India) Gayatri Gopichand	17	16

Final
7	(Japan) Nami Matsuyama (Japan) Chiharu Shida	21	21
(China) Zhang Shuxian (China) Zheng Yu	13	9

=== Top half ===
==== Section 1 ====
First round
1	(China) Chen QC (China) Jia YF	15	16
(South Korea) Jeong N-e (South Korea) Kim H-j	21	21
(Thailand) S Paewsampran (Thailand) P Supajirakul	21	21
PFR	(India) M Jakkampudi (India) P S. Ram	5	3
PFR	(Brazil) J Lima (Brazil) S Lima	8	12
(Malaysia) P Tan (Malaysia) Thinaah M	21	21
(India) A Ponnappa (India) N. S Reddy	9	13
(Japan) R Iwanaga (Japan) K Nakanishi	21	21

Second round
(South Korea) Jeong N-e (South Korea) Kim H-j	19	21	21
(Thailand) S Paewsampran (Thailand) P Supajirakul	21	13	13
(Malaysia) P Tan (Malaysia) Thinaah M	18	21	21
(Japan) R Iwanaga (Japan) K Nakanishi	21	19	16

Quarter-finals
(South Korea) Jeong N-e (South Korea) Kim H-j	15	21	21
(Malaysia) P Tan (Malaysia) Thinaah M	21	17	9

==== Section 2 ====
First round
3	(South Korea) Kim S-y (South Korea) Kong H-y	21	21
PFR	(Malaysia) V Hoo (Malaysia) Lim C S	9	12
(India) S Gurazada (United States) I Jaiswal	9	4
(Canada) R Honderich (Canada) K Tsai	21	21
7	(Japan) N Matsuyama (Japan) C Shida	21	21
(Germany) L Efler (Germany) I Lohau	18	18
(Sweden) J Magnusson (Sweden) C Nistad	21	21
(Estonia) K-K Marran (Estonia) H Rüütel	19	10

Second round
3	(South Korea) Kim S-y (South Korea) Kong H-y	20	21	21
(Canada) R Honderich (Canada) K Tsai	22	18	8
7	(Japan) N Matsuyama (Japan) C Shida	21	21
(Sweden) J Magnusson (Sweden) C Nistad	19	19

Quarter-finals
3	(South Korea) Kim S-y (South Korea) Kong H-y	10	18
7	(Japan) N Matsuyama (Japan) C Shida	21	21

=== Bottom half ===
==== Section 3 ====
First round
(Spain) C Azurmendi (Spain) B Corrales	16	9
(Netherlands) D Jille (Netherlands) C Seinen	21	21
(Scotland) J MacPherson (Scotland) C Torrance	13	19
8	(Thailand) J Kititharakul (Thailand) R Prajongjai	21	21
(Denmark) C Busch (Denmark) A Schulz	21	18	14
(England) C Birch (England) J Pugh	11	21	21
(China) Zhang SX (China) Zheng Y	21	11	21
4	(Japan) Y Fukushima (Japan) S Hirota	19	21	11

Second round
(Netherlands) D Jille (Netherlands) C Seinen	18	21	23
8	(Thailand) J Kititharakul (Thailand) R Prajongjai	21	18	25
(England) C Birch (England) J Pugh	16	15
(China) Zhang SX (China) Zheng Y	21	21

Quarter-finals
8	(Thailand) J Kititharakul (Thailand) R Prajongjai	21	18	16
(China) Zhang SX (China) Zheng Y	19	21	21

==== Section 4 ====
First round
PFR	(India) T Jolly (India) G Gopichand	17	22	21
(Thailand) B Aimsaard (Thailand) N Aimsaard	21	20	14
(Denmark) M Fruergaard (Denmark) S Thygesen	17	22	14
6	(Indonesia) G Polii (Indonesia) A Rahayu	21	20	21
PFR	(France) M Lambert (France) A Tran	14	18
(China) Liu XX (China) Xia YT	21	21
(Bulgaria) G Stoeva (Bulgaria) S Stoeva	21	21	21
2	(South Korea) Lee S-h (South Korea) Shin S-c	16	23	23

Second round
PFR	(India) T Jolly (India) G Gopichand	18	19
6	(Indonesia) G Polii (Indonesia) A Rahayu	21	14^{r}
(China) Liu XX (China) Xia YT	8^{r}
2	(South Korea) Lee S-h (South Korea) Shin S-c	13

Quarter-finals
PFR	(India) T Jolly (India) G Gopichand	14	22	21
2	(South Korea) Lee S-h (South Korea) Shin S-c	21	20	15

== Mixed doubles ==
=== Seeds ===
1. (Thailand) Dechapol Puavaranukroh / Sapsiree Taerattanachai (semi-finals)
2. (China) Zheng Siwei / Huang Yaqiong (semi-finals)
3. (China) Wang Yilyu / Huang Dongping (final)
4. (Japan) Yuta Watanabe / Arisa Higashino (champions)
5. (Indonesia) Praveen Jordan / Melati Daeva Oktavianti (quarter-finals)
6. (England) Marcus Ellis / Lauren Smith (second round)
7. (Malaysia) Tan Kian Meng / Lai Pei Jing (quarter-finals)
8. (France) Thom Gicquel / Delphine Delrue (quarter-finals)

=== Finals ===
Semi-finals
1	(Thailand) Dechapol Puavaranukroh (Thailand) Sapsiree Taerattanachai	14	15
4	(Japan) Yuta Watanabe (Japan) Arisa Higashino	21	21
3	(China) Wang Yilyu (China) Huang Dongping	21	13	21
2	(China) Zheng Siwei (China) Huang Yaqiong	7	21	13

Final
4	(Japan) Yuta Watanabe (Japan) Arisa Higashino	21	21
3	(China) Wang Yilyu (China) Huang Dongping	19	19

=== Top half ===
==== Section 1 ====
First round
1	(Thailand) D Puavaranukroh (Thailand) S Taerattanachai	21	21
(Malaysia) Chen T J (Malaysia) Peck Y W	10	18
(Denmark) M Thyrri (Denmark) A Magelund	21	21
(Malaysia) Goh S H (Malaysia) S J Lai	18	16
8	(France) T Gicquel (France) D Delrue	21	14	21
(Japan) K Yamashita (Japan) N Shinoya	16	21	15
PFR	(New Zealand) O Leydon-Davis (New Zealand) A Pak	16	17
(Germany) J R Jansen (Germany) L Efler	21	21

Second round
1	(Thailand) D Puavaranukroh (Thailand) S Taerattanachai	21	21
(Denmark) M Thyrri (Denmark) A Magelund	11	13
8	(France) T Gicquel (France) D Delrue	21	20	21
(Germany) J R Jansen (Germany) L Efler	11	22	15

Quarter-finals
1	(Thailand) D Puavaranukroh (Thailand) S Taerattanachai	21	21
8	(France) T Gicquel (France) D Delrue	18	11

==== Section 2 ====
First round
4	(Japan) Y Watanabe (Japan) A Higashino	21	21
(Egypt) A H Elgamal (Egypt) D Hany	4	5
(Denmark) M Christiansen (Denmark) A Bøje	21	19	18
(Indonesia) D Ferdinansyah (Indonesia) G E Widjaja	11	21	21
6	(England) M Ellis (England) L Smith	21	21
(Indonesia) R Rivaldy (Indonesia) P H Mentari	17	19
(Netherlands) R Tabeling (Netherlands) S Piek	24	15	12
(Japan) Y Kaneko (Japan) M Matsutomo	22	21	21

Second round
4	(Japan) Y Watanabe (Japan) A Higashino	21	21
(Indonesia) D Ferdinansyah (Indonesia) G E Widjaja	19	17
6	(England) M Ellis (England) L Smith	15	23	20
(Japan) Y Kaneko (Japan) M Matsutomo	21	21	22

Quarter-finals
4	(Japan) Y Watanabe (Japan) A Higashino	21	21
(Japan) Y Kaneko (Japan) M Matsutomo	12	7

=== Bottom half ===
==== Section 3 ====
First round
(Malaysia) Hoo P R (Malaysia) Cheah Y S	21	21
(India) V G Prasad (India) J Dewangan	9	13
(India) I Bhatnagar (India) T Crasto	14	13
5	(Indonesia) P Jordan (Indonesia) M D Oktavianti	21	21
(Scotland) A Hall (Scotland) J MacPherson	14	21	23
(China) Ou XY (China) Zhang SX	21	18	21
(Denmark) M Mikkelsen (Denmark) R Søby Hansen	15	4
3	(China) Wang YL (China) Huang DP	21	21

Second round
(Malaysia) Hoo P R (Malaysia) Cheah Y S	16	14
5	(Indonesia) P Jordan (Indonesia) M D Oktavianti	21	21
(Scotland) A Hall (Scotland) J MacPherson	11	11
3	(China) Wang YL (China) Huang DP	21	21

Quarter-finals
5	(Indonesia) P Jordan (Indonesia) M D Oktavianti	23	19
3	(China) Wang YL (China) Huang DP	25	21

==== Section 4 ====
First round
(Thailand) S Jomkoh (Thailand) S Paewsampran	21	21
(Germany) M Lamsfuß (Germany) I Lohau	12	19
(Indonesia) A Maulana (Indonesia) M C Bandaso	14	21	16
7	(Malaysia) Tan K M (Malaysia) Lai P J	21	13	21
(England) C Hemming (England) J Pugh	21	17	11
(Malaysia) Ong Y S (Malaysia) Goh L Y	17	21	21
(France) W Villeger (France) A Tran	15	21	12
2	(China) Zheng SW (China) Huang YQ	21	18	21

Second round
(Thailand) S Jomkoh (Thailand) S Paewsampran	19	17
7	(Malaysia) Tan K M (Malaysia) Lai P J	21	21
(Malaysia) Ong Y S (Malaysia) Goh L Y	5	15
2	(China) Zheng SW (China) Huang YQ	21	21

Quarter-finals
7	(Malaysia) Tan K M (Malaysia) Lai P J	15	15
2	(China) Zheng SW (China) Huang YQ	21	21

Preceded by 2022 German Open	BWF World Tour; 2022 BWF season	Succeeded by 2022 Swiss Open
