= 2018 All England Open =

2018 badminton tournament in Birmingham

Tournament details
- Dates: 14–18 March
- Edition: 108th
- Level: Super 1000
- Total prize money: US$1,000,000
- Venue: Arena Birmingham
- Location: Birmingham, England

Champions
- Men's singles: (China) Shi Yuqi
- Women's singles: (Chinese Taipei) Tai Tzu-ying
- Men's doubles: (Indonesia) Marcus Fernaldi Gideon (Indonesia) Kevin Sanjaya Sukamuljo
- Women's doubles: (Denmark) Kamilla Rytter Juhl (Denmark) Christinna Pedersen
- Mixed doubles: (Japan) Yuta Watanabe (Japan) Arisa Higashino

The 2018 All England Open, officially the Yonex All England Open Badminton Championships 2018, was a badminton tournament which took place at Arena Birmingham in England from 14 to 18 March 2018. It had a total purse of $1 million.

== Tournament ==
The 2018 All England Open was the seventh tournament of the 2018 BWF World Tour and also part of the All England Open championships, which has been held since 1899. This tournament was organized by Badminton England and sanctioned by the BWF. It was also the first ever new Super 1000 Level 2 tournament of the BWF World Tour schedule.

=== Venue ===
This international tournament was held at Arena Birmingham in Birmingham, England.

=== Point distribution ===
Below is the point distribution for each phase of the tournament based on the BWF points system for the BWF World Tour Super 1000 event.

Winner	Runner-up	3/4	5/8	9/16	17/32
12,000	10,200	8,400	6,600	4,800	3,000

=== Prize money ===
The total prize money for this year's tournament was US$1,000,000. Distribution of prize money was in accordance with BWF regulations.

Event	Winner	Finals	Semi-finals	Quarter-finals	Last 16	Last 32
Singles	$70,000	$34,000	$14,000	$5,500	$3,000	$1,000
Doubles	$74,000	$35,000	$14,000	$6,250	$3,250	$1,000

== Men's singles ==
=== Seeds ===
1. (Denmark) Viktor Axelsen (withdrew)
2. (Malaysia) Lee Chong Wei (quarterfinals)
3. (India) Srikanth Kidambi (second round)
4. (China) Chen Long (quarterfinals)
5. (South Korea) Son Wan-ho (semifinals)
6. (China) Lin Dan (final)
7. (China) Shi Yuqi (champion)
8. (Chinese Taipei) Chou Tien-chen (first round)

=== Finals ===
Semifinals
5	(South Korea) Son Wan-ho	17	14
7	(China) Shi Yuqi	21	21
(China) Huang Yuxiang	14	21	11
6	(China) Lin Dan	21	13	21

Final
7	(China) Shi Yuqi	21	16	21
6	(China) Lin Dan	19	21	9

=== Top half ===
==== Section 1 ====
First Round
PFR	(Netherlands) M Caljouw	20	11
(Hong Kong) Ng K L	22	21
(Japan) K Nishimoto	21	21
(Japan) K Tsuneyama	8	18
5	(South Korea) Son W-h	13	21	21
(India) B. Sai Praneeth	21	15	11
(Hong Kong) Wong W K	7	13
(Indonesia) J Christie	21	21

Second Round
(Hong Kong) Ng K L	12	15
(Japan) K Nishimoto	21	21
5	(South Korea) Son W-h	21	21
(Indonesia) J Christie	16	12

Quarterfinals
(Japan) K Nishimoto	18	21	14
5	(South Korea) Son W-h	21	9	21

==== Section 2 ====
First Round
4	(China) Chen L	21	21
PFR	(China) Qiao B	13	11
(Chinese Taipei) Hsu J-h	14	14
(Thailand) K Phetpradab	21	21
7	(China) Shi YQ	21	21
(South Korea) Jeon H-j	18	19
(Denmark) A Antonsen	11	14
(South Korea) Lee H-i	21	21

Second Round
4	(China) Chen L	21	21
(Thailand) K Phetpradab	18	14
7	(China) Shi YQ	21	21
(South Korea) Lee H-i	11	19

Quarterfinals
4	(China) Chen L	10	17
7	(China) Shi YQ	21	21

=== Bottom half ===
==== Section 3 ====
First Round
(Indonesia) T Sugiarto	21	21
(Indonesia) A S Ginting	14	19
(India) Prannoy H. S.	9	21	21
8	(Chinese Taipei) Chou T-c	21	18	18
(China) Huang YX	21	21
(England) R Ouseph	13	14
(France) B Leverdez	21	14	20
3	(India) S Kidambi	7	21	22

Second Round
(Indonesia) T Sugiarto	10	19
(India) Prannoy H. S.	21	21
(China) Huang YX	21	15	22
3	(India) S Kidambi	11	21	20

Quarterfinals
(India) Prannoy H. S.	22	16	21
(China) Huang YX	20	21	23

==== Section 4 ====
First Round
(Chinese Taipei) Wang T-w	21	21
(Thailand) T Saensomboonsuk	17	18
(Denmark) H-K Vittinghus	19	16
6	(China) Lin D	21	21
(Denmark) J Ø. Jørgensen	21	10	17
(South Korea) Lee D-k	13	21	21
(Brazil) Y Coelho	15	17
2	(Malaysia) Lee C W	21	21

Second Round
(Chinese Taipei) Wang T-w	13	21
6	(China) Lin D	21	23
(South Korea) Lee D-k	6	21	18
2	(Malaysia) Lee C W	21	13	21

Quarterfinals
6	(China) Lin D	21	21
2	(Malaysia) Lee C W	16	17

== Women's singles ==
=== Seeds ===
1. (Chinese Taipei) Tai Tzu-ying (champion)
2. (Japan) Akane Yamaguchi (final)
3. (Thailand) Ratchanok Intanon (first round)
4. (India) P. V. Sindhu (semifinals)
5. (Spain) Carolina Marín (quarterfinals)
6. (South Korea) Sung Ji-hyun (first round)
7. (Japan) Nozomi Okuhara (quarterfinals)
8. (China) Chen Yufei (semifinals)

=== Finals ===
Semifinals
1	(Chinese Taipei) Tai Tzu-ying	21	20	21
8	(China) Chen Yufei	15	22	13
4	(India) P. V. Sindhu	21	19	18
2	(Japan) Akane Yamaguchi	19	21	21

Final
1	(Chinese Taipei) Tai Tzu-ying	22	21
2	(Japan) Akane Yamaguchi	20	13

=== Top half ===
==== Section 1 ====
First Round
1	(Chinese Taipei) Tai T-y	21	21
(India) S Nehwal	14	18
(Thailand) B Ongbumrungpan	21	21
(Scotland) K Gilmour	15	19
6	(South Korea) Sung J-h	16	17
(Japan) A Ohori	21	21
(Malaysia) Goh J W	6
(China) He BJ	1^{r}

Second Round
1	(Chinese Taipei) Tai T-y	21	21
(Thailand) B Ongbumrungpan	15	11
(Japan) A Ohori	24	21
(Malaysia) Goh J W	22	18

Quarterfinals
1	(Chinese Taipei) Tai T-y	21	21
(Japan) A Ohori	12	13

==== Section 2 ====
First Round
3	(Thailand) R Intanon	15	21	19
(Canada) M Li	21	14	21
(Denmark) M Blichfeldt	15	21	23
PFR	(Spain) B Corrales	21	13	21
8	(China) Chen YF	w	/	o
(China) Chen XX
(Denmark) L Kjærsfeldt	15	12
(South Korea) Kim H-m	21	21

Second Round
(Canada) M Li	19	14
(Denmark) M Blichfeldt	21	21
8	(China) Chen YF	21	21
(South Korea) Kim H-m	15	14

Quarterfinals
(Denmark) M Blichfeldt	17	12
8	(China) Chen YF	21	21

=== Bottom half ===
==== Section 3 ====
First Round
(Indonesia) Fitriani	16	21	21
(Malaysia) S Cheah	21	18	9
(Chinese Taipei) Pai Y-p	15	8
7	(Japan) N Okuhara	21	21
(United States) BW Zhang	18	14
(Thailand) N Jindapol	21	21
(Thailand) P Chochuwong	22	17	9
4	(India) P. V. Sindhu	20	21	21

Second Round
(Indonesia) Fitriani	13	15
7	(Japan) N Okuhara	21	21
(Thailand) N Jindapol	13	21	18
4	(India) P. V. Sindhu	21	13	21

Quarterfinals
7	(Japan) N Okuhara	22	18	18
4	(India) P. V. Sindhu	20	21	21

==== Section 4 ====
First Round
(Russia) E Kosetskaya	9	11
(Japan) S Kawakami	21	21
(South Korea) Lee J-m	17	8
5	(Spain) C Marín	21	21
(Japan) S Sato	21	21
(Hong Kong) Cheung N Y	10	14
(Chinese Taipei) Lee C-h	10	14
2	(Japan) A Yamaguchi	21	21

Second Round
(Japan) S Kawakami	13	17
5	(Spain) C Marín	21	21
(Japan) S Sato	21	10	12
2	(Japan) A Yamaguchi	18	21	21

Quarterfinals
5	(Spain) C Marín	15	18
2	(Japan) A Yamaguchi	21	21

== Men's doubles ==
=== Seeds ===
1. (Indonesia) Marcus Fernaldi Gideon / Kevin Sanjaya Sukamuljo (champions)
2. (Denmark) Mathias Boe / Carsten Mogensen (final)
3. (China) Li Junhui / Liu Yuchen (quarterfinals)
4. (China) Liu Cheng / Zhang Nan (first round)
5. (Japan) Takeshi Kamura / Keigo Sonoda (first round)
6. (Denmark) Mads Conrad-Petersen / Mads Pieler Kolding (semifinals)
7. (Chinese Taipei) Chen Hung-ling / Wang Chi-lin (quarterfinals)
8. (Chinese Taipei) Lee Jhe-huei / Lee Yang (second round)

=== Finals ===
Semifinals
1	(Indonesia) Marcus Fernaldi Gideon (Indonesia) Kevin Sanjaya Sukamuljo	21	21
6	(Denmark) Mads Conrad-Petersen (Denmark) Mads Pieler Kolding	11	19
(Japan) Hiroyuki Endo (Japan) Yuta Watanabe	17	17
2	(Denmark) Mathias Boe (Denmark) Carsten Mogensen	21	21

Final
1	(Indonesia) Marcus Fernaldi Gideon (Indonesia) Kevin Sanjaya Sukamuljo	21	21
2	(Denmark) Mathias Boe (Denmark) Carsten Mogensen	18	17

=== Top half ===
==== Section 1 ====
First Round
1	(Indonesia) M F Gideon (Indonesia) K S Sukamuljo	21	21
(Indonesia) A Pratama (Indonesia) R A Saputro	16	19
(Indonesia) F Alfian (Indonesia) M R Ardianto	16	21	21
(Malaysia) Ong Y S (Malaysia) Teo E Y	21	16	23
7	(Chinese Taipei) Chen H-l (Chinese Taipei) Wang C-l	21	21
(Japan) T Inoue (Japan) Y Kaneko	10	15
(England) P Briggs (England) T Wolfenden	19	15
(Denmark) M Christiansen (Denmark) D Daugaard	21	21

Second Round
1	(Indonesia) M F Gideon (Indonesia) K S Sukamuljo	21	20	21
(Malaysia) Ong Y S (Malaysia) Teo E Y	17	22	13
7	(Chinese Taipei) Chen H-l (Chinese Taipei) Wang C-l	19	21	21
(Denmark) M Christiansen (Denmark) D Daugaard	21	16	18

Quarterfinals
1	(Indonesia) M F Gideon (Indonesia) K S Sukamuljo	21	21
7	(Chinese Taipei) Chen H-l (Chinese Taipei) Wang C-l	15	13

==== Section 2 ====
First Round
3	(China) Li JH (China) Liu YC	21	21
(South Korea) Kim W-h (South Korea) Seo S-j	15	12
(Denmark) K Astrup (Denmark) A S Rasmussen	21	25
(Chinese Taipei) Lu C-y (Chinese Taipei) Yang P-h	15	23
6	(Denmark) M Conrad-Petersen (Denmark) M P Kolding	22	16	21
(Thailand) B Issara (Thailand) N Phuangphuapet	20	21	18
(Germany) M Lamsfuß (Germany) M E Seidel	14	21	16
(Germany) J R Jansen (Germany) J Zurwonne	21	19	21

Second Round
3	(China) Li JH (China) Liu YC	21	21
(Denmark) K Astrup (Denmark) A S Rasmussen	17	17
6	(Denmark) M Conrad-Petersen (Denmark) M P Kolding	22	19	21
(Germany) J R Jansen (Germany) J Zurwonne	20	21	11

Quarterfinals
3	(China) Li JH (China) Liu YC	21	15
6	(Denmark) M Conrad-Petersen (Denmark) M P Kolding	23	21

=== Bottom half ===
==== Section 3 ====
First Round
(Japan) H Endo (Japan) Y Watanabe	21	24
(Thailand) K Kedren (Thailand) D Puavaranukroh	8	22
(Russia) V Ivanov (Russia) I Sozonov	19	11
8	(Chinese Taipei) Lee J-h (Chinese Taipei) Lee Y	21	21
(Netherlands) J Arends (Netherlands) R Jille	16	11
(Indonesia) M Ahsan (Indonesia) H Setiawan	21	21
(Chinese Taipei) Liao M-c (Chinese Taipei) Su C-h	22	22
4	(China) Liu C (China) Zhang N	20	20

Second Round
(Japan) H Endo (Japan) Y Watanabe	16	21	22
8	(Chinese Taipei) Lee J-h (Chinese Taipei) Lee Y	21	16	20
(Indonesia) M Ahsan (Indonesia) H Setiawan	21	18	14
(Chinese Taipei) Liao M-c (Chinese Taipei) Su C-h	13	21	21

Quarterfinals
(Japan) H Endo (Japan) Y Watanabe	21	21
(Chinese Taipei) Liao M-c (Chinese Taipei) Su C-h	14	19

==== Section 4 ====
First Round
(India) M Attri (India) B. S Reddy	20	12
(England) M Ellis (England) C Langridge	22	21
(Malaysia) Goh V S (Malaysia) Tan W K	21	21
5	(Japan) T Kamura (Japan) K Sonoda	13	17
(Japan) T Hoki (Japan) Y Kobayashi	19	18
(India) S Rankireddy (India) C Shetty	21	21
(South Korea) Chung E-s (South Korea) Kim D-y	17	9
2	(Denmark) M Boe (Denmark) C Mogensen	21	21

Second Round
(England) M Ellis (England) C Langridge	21	21	12
(Malaysia) Goh V S (Malaysia) Tan W K	16	23	21
(India) S Rankireddy (India) C Shetty	16	21	21
2	(Denmark) M Boe (Denmark) C Mogensen	21	16	23

Quarterfinals
(Malaysia) Goh V S (Malaysia) Tan W K	20	11
2	(Denmark) M Boe (Denmark) C Mogensen	22	21

== Women's doubles ==
=== Seeds ===
1. (China) Chen Qingchen / Jia Yifan (quarterfinals)
2. (Japan) Misaki Matsutomo / Ayaka Takahashi (quarterfinals)
3. (Denmark) Kamilla Rytter Juhl / Christinna Pedersen (champions)
4. (Japan) Yuki Fukushima / Sayaka Hirota (final)
5. (Japan) Shiho Tanaka / Koharu Yonemoto (semifinals)
6. (Indonesia) Greysia Polii / Apriyani Rahayu (first round)
7. (South Korea) Lee So-hee / Shin Seung-chan (quarterfinals)
8. (Thailand) Jongkolphan Kititharakul / Rawinda Prajongjai (quarterfinals)

=== Finals ===
Semifinals
5	(Japan) Shiho Tanaka (Japan) Koharu Yonemoto	21	10	12
4	(Japan) Yuki Fukushima (Japan) Sayaka Hirota	16	21	21
3	(Denmark) Kamilla Rytter Juhl (Denmark) Christinna Pedersen	21	22
(Japan) Mayu Matsumoto (Japan) Wakana Nagahara	15	20

Final
4	(Japan) Yuki Fukushima (Japan) Sayaka Hirota	19	18
3	(Denmark) Kamilla Rytter Juhl (Denmark) Christinna Pedersen	21	21

=== Top half ===
==== Section 1 ====
First Round
1	(China) Chen QC (China) Jia YF	22	21
(Japan) N Fukuman (Japan) K Yonao	20	14
(Denmark) M Fruergaard (Denmark) S Thygesen	21	22
(Chinese Taipei) Chiang K-h (Chinese Taipei) Hung S-h	13	20
5	(Japan) S Tanaka (Japan) K Yonemoto	21	21
(India) M Jakkampudi (India) P S Ram	14	11
(Indonesia) A S Awanda (Indonesia) N K M Istirani	22	21
(England) C Birch (England) J Pugh	20	14

Second Round
1	(China) Chen QC (China) Jia YF	26	21
(Denmark) M Fruergaard (Denmark) S Thygesen	24	11
5	(Japan) S Tanaka (Japan) K Yonemoto	21	21
(Indonesia) A S Awanda (Indonesia) N K M Istirani	18	15

Quarterfinals
1	(China) Chen QC (China) Jia YF	21	17	15
5	(Japan) S Tanaka (Japan) K Yonemoto	14	21	21

==== Section 2 ====
First Round
4	(Japan) Y Fukushima (Japan) S Hirota	21	21
(France) D Delrue (France) L Palermo	12	16
PFR	(China) Tang JH (China) Yu XH	22	10	15
(South Korea) Kim S-y (South Korea) Kong H-y	20	21	21
8	(Thailand) J Kititharakul (Thailand) R Prajongjai	21	21
(Netherlands) S Piek (Netherlands) C Seinen	17	16
(Chinese Taipei) Hsu Y-c (Chinese Taipei) Wu T-j	15	16
(Thailand) C Chaladchalam (Thailand) P Muenwong	21	21

Second Round
4	(Japan) Y Fukushima (Japan) S Hirota	21	21
(South Korea) Kim S-y (South Korea) Kong H-y	13	13
8	(Thailand) J Kititharakul (Thailand) R Prajongjai	16	21	21
(Thailand) C Chaladchalam (Thailand) P Muenwong	21	17	17

Quarterfinals
4	(Japan) Y Fukushima (Japan) S Hirota	21	21
8	(Thailand) J Kititharakul (Thailand) R Prajongjai	16	18

=== Bottom half ===
==== Section 3 ====
First Round
(South Korea) Chae Y-j (South Korea) Jung K-e	21	21
(Denmark) J Finne-Ipsen (Denmark) R Søby Hansen	13	13
(France) É Lefel (France) A Tran	13	16
7	(South Korea) Lee S-h (South Korea) Shin S-c	21	21
(England) L Smith (England) S Walker	18	12
PFR	(China) Du Y (China) Li YH	21	21
(Australia) S Mapasa (Australia) G Somerville	18	21	18
3	(Denmark) K R Juhl (Denmark) C Pedersen	21	18	21

Second Round
(South Korea) Chae Y-j (South Korea) Jung K-e	18	25	11
7	(South Korea) Lee S-h (South Korea) Shin S-c	21	23	21
PFR	(China) Du Y (China) Li YH	22	24	16
3	(Denmark) K R Juhl (Denmark) C Pedersen	24	22	21

Quarterfinals
7	(South Korea) Lee S-h (South Korea) Shin S-c	15	14
3	(Denmark) K R Juhl (Denmark) C Pedersen	21	21

==== Section 4 ====
First Round
(Japan) M Matsumoto (Japan) W Nagahara	21	21
(Russia) A Chervyakova (Russia) O Morozova	17	5
(Bulgaria) G Stoeva (Bulgaria) S Stoeva	21	21
6	(Indonesia) G Polii (Indonesia) A Rahayu	11	19
(Indonesia) D D Haris (Indonesia) R A Pradipta	22	18	21
(South Korea) Chang Y-n (South Korea) Kim H-r	20	21	17
(India) A Ponnappa (India) N. S Reddy	14	13
2	(Japan) M Matsutomo (Japan) A Takahashi	21	21

Second Round
(Japan) M Matsumoto (Japan) W Nagahara	21	21
(Bulgaria) G Stoeva (Bulgaria) S Stoeva	10	12
(Indonesia) D D Haris (Indonesia) R A Pradipta	12	14
2	(Japan) M Matsutomo (Japan) A Takahashi	21	21

Quarterfinals
(Japan) M Matsumoto (Japan) W Nagahara	21	25
2	(Japan) M Matsutomo (Japan) A Takahashi	17	23

== Mixed doubles ==
=== Seeds ===
1. (Indonesia) Tontowi Ahmad / Liliyana Natsir (second round)
2. (China) Wang Yilü / Huang Dongping (quarterfinals)
3. (Hong Kong) Tang Chun Man / Tse Ying Suet (first round)
4. (Indonesia) Praveen Jordan / Debby Susanto (quarterfinals)
5. (China) Zheng Siwei / Huang Yaqiong (final)
6. (Denmark) Mathias Christiansen / Christinna Pedersen (semifinals)
7. (England) Chris Adcock / Gabrielle Adcock (quarterfinals)
8. (China) Zhang Nan / Li Yinhui (semifinals)

=== Finals ===
Semifinals
8	(China) Zhang Nan (China) Li Yinhui	14	18
(Japan) Yuta Watanabe (Japan) Arisa Higashino	21	21
6	(Denmark) Mathias Christiansen (Denmark) Christinna Pedersen	21	14	19
5	(China) Zheng Siwei (China) Huang Yaqiong	18	21	21

Final
(Japan) Yuta Watanabe (Japan) Arisa Higashino	15	22	21
5	(China) Zheng Siwei (China) Huang Yaqiong	21	20	16

=== Top half ===
==== Section 1 ====
First Round
1	(Indonesia) T Ahmad (Indonesia) L Natsir	21	21
(Russia) E Dremin (Russia) E Dimova	10	12
(Malaysia) Tan K M (Malaysia) Lai P J	18	11
(Indonesia) H Faizal (Indonesia) G E Widjaja	21	21
8	(China) Zhang N (China) Li YH	21	21
(France) R Labar (France) A Fontaine	17	16
(Malaysia) Chan P S (Malaysia) Goh L Y	18	24	21
(Republic of Ireland) S Magee (Republic of Ireland) C Magee	21	22	15

Second Round
1	(Indonesia) T Ahmad (Indonesia) L Natsir	21	15	29
(Indonesia) H Faizal (Indonesia) G E Widjaja	18	21	30
8	(China) Zhang N (China) Li YH	24	22
(Malaysia) Chan P S (Malaysia) Goh L Y	22	20

Quarterfinals
(Indonesia) H Faizal (Indonesia) G E Widjaja	14	21	18
8	(China) Zhang N (China) Li YH	21	18	21

==== Section 2 ====
First Round
3	(Hong Kong) Tang C M (Hong Kong) Tse Y S	21	18	16
(Japan) Y Watanabe (Japan) A Higashino	18	21	21
(Netherlands) J Arends (Netherlands) S Piek	24	21
(Denmark) J F Nielsen (Denmark) A Bøje	22	18
7	(England) C Adcock (England) G Adcock	21	21
(Malaysia) Goh S H (Malaysia) S J Lai	14	15
(Chinese Taipei) Wang C-l (Chinese Taipei) Lee C-h	22	21	12
(South Korea) Seo S-j (South Korea) Kim H-n	24	16	21

Second Round
(Japan) Y Watanabe (Japan) A Higashino	21	21
(Netherlands) J Arends (Netherlands) S Piek	17	19
7	(England) C Adcock (England) G Adcock	23	23
(South Korea) Seo S-j (South Korea) Kim H-n	21	21

Quarterfinals
(Japan) Y Watanabe (Japan) A Higashino	18	21	21
7	(England) C Adcock (England) G Adcock	21	15	15

=== Bottom half ===
==== Section 3 ====
First Round
(Hong Kong) Lee C H (Hong Kong) Chau H W	16	21	18
(Thailand) D Puavaranukroh (Thailand) S Taerattanachai	21	7	21
(Germany) M Lamsfuß (Germany) I Herttrich	21	17	12
6	(Denmark) M Christiansen (Denmark) C Pedersen	17	21	21
(England) M Ellis (England) L Smith	21	21
(Denmark) M Mikkelsen (Denmark) M Surrow	15	17
(Chinese Taipei) Lee Y (Chinese Taipei) Hsu Y-c	12	19
4	(Indonesia) P Jordan (Indonesia) D Susanto	21	21

Second Round
(Thailand) D Puavaranukroh (Thailand) S Taerattanachai	18	21	15
6	(Denmark) M Christiansen (Denmark) C Pedersen	21	18	21
(England) M Ellis (England) L Smith	12	17
4	(Indonesia) P Jordan (Indonesia) D Susanto	21	21

Quarterfinals
6	(Denmark) M Christiansen (Denmark) C Pedersen	21	21
4	(Indonesia) P Jordan (Indonesia) D Susanto	16	15

==== Section 4 ====
First Round
(China) Lu K (China) Cao TW	13	21	20
(Chinese Taipei) Lu C-y (Chinese Taipei) Chiang K-h	21	14	22
(England) B Lane (England) J Pugh	14	9
5	(China) Zheng SW (China) Huang YQ	21	21
(India) P Chopra (India) N. S Reddy	21	21
(Germany) M E Seidel (Germany) L Efler	19	13
(South Korea) Choi S-g (South Korea) Chae Y-j	15	17
2	(China) Wang YL (China) Huang DP	21	21

Second Round
(Chinese Taipei) Lu C-y (Chinese Taipei) Chiang K-h	5	5
5	(China) Zheng SW (China) Huang YQ	21	21
(India) P Chopra (India) N. S Reddy	6	10
2	(China) Wang YL (China) Huang DP	21	21

Quarterfinals
5	(China) Zheng SW (China) Huang YQ	21	16	21
2	(China) Wang YL (China) Huang DP	16	21	11

Preceded by 2018 German Open	BWF World Tour; 2018 BWF season	Succeeded by 2018 Orléans Masters
