= 2019 All England Open =

Badminton tournament in Birmingham

Tournament details
- Dates: 6–10 March
- Edition: 109th
- Level: Super 1000
- Total prize money: US$1,000,000
- Venue: Arena Birmingham
- Location: Birmingham, England

Champions
- Men's singles: (Japan) Kento Momota
- Women's singles: (China) Chen Yufei
- Men's doubles: (Indonesia) Mohammad Ahsan (Indonesia) Hendra Setiawan
- Women's doubles: (China) Chen Qingchen (China) Jia Yifan
- Mixed doubles: (China) Zheng Siwei (China) Huang Yaqiong

The 2019 All England Open (officially known as the Yonex All England Open Badminton Championships 2019 for sponsorship reasons) was a badminton tournament which took place at Arena Birmingham in England from 6 to 10 March 2019. It had a total purse of $1,000,000.

== Tournament ==
The 2019 All England Open was the sixth tournament of the 2019 BWF World Tour and also part of the All England Open championships, which had been held since 1899. This tournament was organized by Badminton England and sanctioned by the BWF. Ticket price for 2019 All England Open started at £16 for adults and at £5 for children.

=== Venue ===
This international tournament was held at Arena Birmingham in Birmingham, England.

=== Point distribution ===
Below is the point distribution for each phase of the tournament based on the BWF points system for the BWF World Tour Super 1000 event.

Winner	Runner-up	3/4	5/8	9/16	17/32
12,000	10,200	8,400	6,600	4,800	3,000

=== Prize money ===
The total prize money for this year's tournament was US$1,000,000. Distribution of prize money was in accordance with BWF regulations.

Event	Winner	Finals	Semi-finals	Quarter-finals	Last 16	Last 32
Singles	$70,000	$34,000	$14,000	$5,500	$3,000	$1,000
Doubles	$74,000	$35,000	$14,000	$6,250	$3,250	$1,000

== Men's singles ==
=== Seeds ===
1. (Japan) Kento Momota (champion)
2. (China) Shi Yuqi (semi-finals)
3. (Chinese Taipei) Chou Tien-chen (first round)
4. (China) Chen Long (first round)
5. (South Korea) Son Wan-ho (first round)
6. (Denmark) Viktor Axelsen (final)
7. (India) Srikanth Kidambi (quarter-finals)
8. (Indonesia) Anthony Sinisuka Ginting (first round)

=== Finals ===
Semi-finals
1	(Japan) Kento Momota	21	21
(Hong Kong) Ng Ka Long	19	11
6	(Denmark) Viktor Axelsen	22	13	21
2	(China) Shi Yuqi	20	21	9

Final
1	(Japan) Kento Momota	21	15	21
6	(Denmark) Viktor Axelsen	11	21	15

=== Top half ===
==== Section 1 ====
First Round
1	(Japan) K Momota	21	21
(Thailand) K Phetpradab	13	7
(Thailand) K Wangcharoen	23	14	22
(Chinese Taipei) Wang T-w	21	21	20
7	(India) S Kidambi	21	21
(France) B Leverdez	13	11
(Indonesia) J Christie	21	21
(South Korea) Lee D-k	16	19

Second Round
1	(Japan) K Momota	21	21
(Thailand) K Wangcharoen	19	11
7	(India) S Kidambi	21	11	21
(Indonesia) J Christie	17	21	12

Quarter-finals
1	(Japan) K Momota	21	21
7	(India) S Kidambi	12	16

==== Section 2 ====
First Round
3	(Chinese Taipei) Chou T-c	14	21	22
(China) Huang YX	21	16	24
(Indonesia) T Sugiarto	21	21
(England) R Ouseph	16	19
8	(Indonesia) A S Ginting	18	21	11
(Hong Kong) Ng K L	21	13	21
(India) B. Sai Praneeth	21	21
(India) Prannoy H. S.	19	19

Second Round
(China) Huang YX	24	17	16
(Indonesia) T Sugiarto	22	21	21
(Hong Kong) Ng K L	21	21
(India) B. Sai Praneeth	12	17

Quarter-finals
(Indonesia) T Sugiarto	21	14	15
(Hong Kong) Ng K L	16	21	21

=== Bottom half ===
==== Section 3 ====
First Round
(China) Lu GZ	20	21	21
(Denmark) H-K Vittinghus	22	15	11
(India) S Verma	21	18	14
6	(Denmark) V Axelsen	16	21	21
(Denmark) J Ø. Jørgensen	21	21
(Japan) K Sakai	10	17
(Denmark) R Gemke	21	21
4	(China) Chen L	15	17

Second Round
(China) Lu GZ	19	16
6	(Denmark) V Axelsen	21	21
(Denmark) J Ø. Jørgensen	21	22
(Denmark) R Gemke	17	20

Quarter-finals
6	(Denmark) V Axelsen	23	21
(Denmark) J Ø. Jørgensen	21	18

==== Section 4 ====
First Round
(China) Lin D	21	14	7
(Japan) K Tsuneyama	19	21	21
(Japan) K Nishimoto	23	14
5	(South Korea) Son W-h	21	5^{r}
(Thailand) S Avihingsanon	13	17
(Malaysia) Liew D	21	21
(Denmark) A Antonsen	17	16
2	(China) Shi YQ	21	21

Second Round
(Japan) K Tsuneyama	21	21
(Japan) K Nishimoto	19	13
(Malaysia) Liew D	8	10
2	(China) Shi YQ	21	21

Quarter-finals
(Japan) K Tsuneyama	14	7
2	(China) Shi YQ	21	21

== Women's singles ==
=== Seeds ===
1. (Chinese Taipei) Tai Tzu-ying (final)
2. (Japan) Nozomi Okuhara (semi-finals)
3. (China) Chen Yufei (champion)
4. (Japan) Akane Yamaguchi (semi-finals)
5. (India) P. V. Sindhu (first round)
6. (China) He Bingjiao (quarter-finals)
7. (Thailand) Ratchanok Intanon (first round)
8. (India) Saina Nehwal (quarter-finals)

=== Finals ===
Semi-finals
1	(Chinese Taipei) Tai Tzu-ying	21	10	21
4	(Japan) Akane Yamaguchi	13	21	8
3	(China) Chen Yufei	21	21
2	(Japan) Nozomi Okuhara	17	11

Final
1	(Chinese Taipei) Tai Tzu-ying	17	17
3	(China) Chen Yufei	21	21

=== Top half ===
==== Section 1 ====
First Round
1	(Chinese Taipei) Tai T-y	21	21
(Canada) M Li	12	15
(Thailand) N Jindapol	17	14
(United States) BW Zhang	21	21
8	(India) S Nehwal	21	21
(Scotland) K Gilmour	17	18
(China) Cai YY	23	15
(Denmark) L Kjærsfeldt	25	21

Second Round
1	(Chinese Taipei) Tai T-y	21	21
(United States) BW Zhang	15	14
8	(India) S Nehwal	8	21	21
(Denmark) L Kjærsfeldt	21	16	13

Quarter-finals
1	(Chinese Taipei) Tai T-y	21	21
8	(India) S Nehwal	15	19

==== Section 2 ====
First Round
4	(Japan) A Yamaguchi	21	21
(Spain) B Corrales	15	18
(Denmark) M Blichfeldt	22	21
(Hong Kong) Yip P Y	20	14
6	(China) He BJ	17	21	21
(Indonesia) Fitriani	21	15	10
(Thailand) P Chochuwong	21	21
(Thailand) B Ongbamrungphan	18	8

Second Round
4	(Japan) A Yamaguchi	21	21
(Denmark) M Blichfeldt	18	14
6	(China) He BJ	15	21	21
(Thailand) P Chochuwong	21	15	14

Quarter-finals
4	(Japan) A Yamaguchi	21	19	21
6	(China) He BJ	16	21	12

=== Bottom half ===
==== Section 3 ====
First Round
(Russia) E Kosetskaya	15	9
(Hong Kong) Cheung N Y	21	21
(South Korea) Sung J-h	21	20	21
5	(India) P. V. Sindhu	16	22	18
(Malaysia) S Cheah S Y	15	16
(Japan) A Ohori	21	21
(China) Han Y	10	14
3	(China) Chen YF	21	21

Second Round
(Hong Kong) Cheung N Y	11	21	18
(South Korea) Sung J-h	21	18	21
(Japan) A Ohori	6	21	19
3	(China) Chen YF	21	17	21

Quarter-finals
(South Korea) Sung J-h	12	16
3	(China) Chen YF	21	21

==== Section 4 ====
First Round
(China) Li XR	21	22
(Singapore) Yeo J M	19	20
(China) Chen XX	21	24	21
7	(Thailand) R Intanon	23	22	14
(Malaysia) Goh J W	20	13
(Japan) S Takahashi	22	21
(Indonesia) G M Tunjung	17	16
2	(Japan) N Okuhara	21	21

Second Round
(China) Li XR	21	21
(China) Chen XX	14	12
(Japan) S Takahashi	14	21
2	(Japan) N Okuhara	21	23

Quarter-finals
(China) Li XR	17	14
2	(Japan) N Okuhara	21	21

== Men's doubles ==
=== Seeds ===
1. (Indonesia) Marcus Fernaldi Gideon / Kevin Sanjaya Sukamuljo (first round)
2. (China) Li Junhui / Liu Yuchen (first round)
3. (Japan) Takeshi Kamura / Keigo Sonoda (semi-finals)
4. (Japan) Hiroyuki Endo / Yuta Watanabe (second round)
5. (Denmark) Kim Astrup / Anders Skaarup Rasmussen (second round)
6. (Indonesia) Mohammad Ahsan / Hendra Setiawan (champions)
7. (China) Han Chengkai / Zhou Haodong (quarter-finals)
8. (Indonesia) Fajar Alfian / Muhammad Rian Ardianto (semi-finals)

=== Finals ===
Semi-finals
(Malaysia) Aaron Chia (Malaysia) Soh Wooi Yik	12	22	21
8	(Indonesia) Fajar Alfian (Indonesia) Muhammad Rian Ardianto	21	20	19
3	(Japan) Takeshi Kamura (Japan) Keigo Sonoda	19	16
6	(Indonesia) Mohammad Ahsan (Indonesia) Hendra Setiawan	21	21

Final
(Malaysia) Aaron Chia (Malaysia) Soh Wooi Yik	21	14	12
6	(Indonesia) Mohammad Ahsan (Indonesia) Hendra Setiawan	11	21	21

=== Top half ===
==== Section 1 ====
First Round
1	(Indonesia) M F Gideon (Indonesia) K S Sukamuljo	19	22	17
(China) Liu C (China) Zhang N	21	20	21
(Chinese Taipei) Lee Y (Chinese Taipei) Wang C-l	21	21
(Thailand) B Isara (Thailand) M Jongjit	11	16
5	(Denmark) K Astrup (Denmark) A S Rasmussen	21	15	22
(Indonesia) W Nayaka (Indonesia) A Yusuf	18	21	20
(Chinese Taipei) Lu C-y (Chinese Taipei) Yang P-h	21	16	16
(Malaysia) A Chia (Malaysia) Soh W Y	12	21	21

Second Round
(China) Liu C (China) Zhang N	22	16	21
(Chinese Taipei) Lee Y (Chinese Taipei) Wang C-l	20	21	11
5	(Denmark) K Astrup (Denmark) A S Rasmussen	19	16
(Malaysia) A Chia (Malaysia) Soh W Y	21	21

Quarter-finals
(China) Liu C (China) Zhang N	19	21	12
(Malaysia) A Chia (Malaysia) Soh W Y	21	17	21

==== Section 2 ====
First Round
4	(Japan) H Endo (Japan) Y Watanabe	21	15	21
(Malaysia) Ong Y S (Malaysia) Teo E Y	13	21	15
(Indonesia) B Angriawan (Indonesia) Hardianto	14	21	17
(Malaysia) Goh V S (Malaysia) Tan W K	21	17	21
8	(Indonesia) F Alfian (Indonesia) M R Ardianto	23	21
(South Korea) Ko S-h (South Korea) Shin B-c	21	14
(India) M Attri (India) B. S Reddy	19	21	14
(China) Ou XY (China) Ren XY	21	16	21

Second Round
4	(Japan) H Endo (Japan) Y Watanabe	18	19
(Malaysia) Goh V S (Malaysia) Tan W K	21	21
8	(Indonesia) F Alfian (Indonesia) M R Ardianto	13	21	23
(China) Ou XY (China) Ren XY	21	19	21

Quarter-finals
(Malaysia) Goh V S (Malaysia) Tan W K	20	12
8	(Indonesia) F Alfian (Indonesia) M R Ardianto	22	21

=== Bottom half ===
==== Section 3 ====
First Round
(South Korea) Kim G-j (South Korea) Lee Y-d	17	14
(Chinese Taipei) Liao M-c (Chinese Taipei) Su C-h	21	21
(Thailand) T Isriyanet (Thailand) K Namdash	18	18
7	(China) Han CK (China) Zhou HD	21	21
(South Korea) Choi S-g (South Korea) Seo S-j	16	11
(Denmark) M Boe (Denmark) C Mogensen	21	21
(Japan) T Hoki (Japan) Y Kobayashi	17	21	9
3	(Japan) T Kamura (Japan) K Sonoda	21	19	21

Second Round
(Chinese Taipei) Liao M-c (Chinese Taipei) Su C-h	14	22	19
7	(China) Han CK (China) Zhou HD	21	20	21
(Denmark) M Boe (Denmark) C Mogensen	14	16
3	(Japan) T Kamura (Japan) K Sonoda	21	21

Quarter-finals
7	(China) Han CK (China) Zhou HD	12	17
3	(Japan) T Kamura (Japan) K Sonoda	21	21

==== Section 4 ====
First Round
(Japan) T Inoue (Japan) Y Kaneko	21	19	16
(Russia) V Ivanov (Russia) I Sozonov	15	21	21
(England) M Ellis (England) C Langridge	19	12
6	(Indonesia) M Ahsan (Indonesia) H Setiawan	21	21
(Germany) M Lamsfuß (Germany) M Seidel	21	21
(Netherlands) J Maas (Netherlands) R Tabeling	17	12
(China) He JT (China) Tan Q	18	21	24
2	(China) Li JH (China) Liu YC	21	18	22

Second Round
(Russia) V Ivanov (Russia) I Sozonov	19	18
6	(Indonesia) M Ahsan (Indonesia) H Setiawan	21	21
(Germany) M Lamsfuß (Germany) M Seidel	22	21
(China) He JT (China) Tan Q	20	14

Quarter-finals
6	(Indonesia) M Ahsan (Indonesia) H Setiawan	21	21
(Germany) M Lamsfuß (Germany) M Seidel	12	13

== Women's doubles ==
=== Seeds ===
1. (Japan) Yuki Fukushima / Sayaka Hirota (semi-finals)
2. (Japan) Misaki Matsutomo / Ayaka Takahashi (first round)
3. (Japan) Mayu Matsumoto / Wakana Nagahara (final)
4. (Indonesia) Greysia Polii / Apriyani Rahayu (quarter-finals)
5. (China) Chen Qingchen / Jia Yifan (champions)
6. (South Korea) Lee So-hee / Shin Seung-chan (second round)
7. (Japan) Shiho Tanaka / Koharu Yonemoto (semi-finals)
8. (Bulgaria) Gabriela Stoeva / Stefani Stoeva (quarter-finals)

=== Finals ===
Semi-finals
1	(Japan) Yuki Fukushima (Japan) Sayaka Hirota	18	21
5	(China) Chen Qingchen (China) Jia Yifan	21	23
3	(Japan) Mayu Matsumoto (Japan) Wakana Nagahara	21	21
7	(Japan) Shiho Tanaka (Japan) Koharu Yonemoto	11	12

Final
5	(China) Chen Qingchen (China) Jia Yifan	18	22	21
3	(Japan) Mayu Matsumoto (Japan) Wakana Nagahara	21	20	11

=== Top half ===
==== Section 1 ====
First Round
1	(Japan) Y Fukushima (Japan) S Hirota	21	21
(Hong Kong) Ng T Y (Hong Kong) Yuen S Y	17	12
(Sweden) E Karlsson (Sweden) J Magnusson	19	19
(France) É Lefel (France) A Tran	21	21
8	(Bulgaria) G Stoeva (Bulgaria) S Stoeva	21	21
(China) Du Y (China) Li YH	14	13
(China) Chen L (China) Xu Y	21	17	18
(Thailand) P Supajirakul (Thailand) S Taerattanachai	17	21	21

Second Round
1	(Japan) Y Fukushima (Japan) S Hirota	21	19	21
(France) É Lefel (France) A Tran	16	21	13
8	(Bulgaria) G Stoeva (Bulgaria) S Stoeva	21	25
(Thailand) P Supajirakul (Thailand) S Taerattanachai	18	23

Quarter-finals
1	(Japan) Y Fukushima (Japan) S Hirota	17	21	21
8	(Bulgaria) G Stoeva (Bulgaria) S Stoeva	21	15	19

==== Section 2 ====
First Round
4	(Indonesia) G Polii (Indonesia) A Rahayu	21	21
(England) C Birch (England) L Smith	19	15
(China) Dong WJ (China) Feng XY	21	21
(Hong Kong) Ng W Y (Hong Kong) Yeung N T	9	15
5	(China) Chen QC (China) Jia YF	21	21
(Canada) R Honderich (Canada) K Tsai	11	6
(Thailand) J Kititharakul (Thailand) R Prajongjai	22	21
(France) D Delrue (France) L Palermo	20	18

Second Round
4	(Indonesia) G Polii (Indonesia) A Rahayu	21	21
(China) Dong WJ (China) Feng XY	10	12
5	(China) Chen QC (China) Jia YF	21	21
(Thailand) J Kititharakul (Thailand) R Prajongjai	18	14

Quarter-finals
4	(Indonesia) G Polii (Indonesia) A Rahayu	19	17
5	(China) Chen QC (China) Jia YF	21	21

=== Bottom half ===
==== Section 3 ====
First Round
(China) Li WM (China) Zheng Y	21	21
(Netherlands) S Piek (Netherlands) C Seinen	14	10
(Indonesia) D D Haris (Indonesia) T O Kusumah	17	23
6	(South Korea) Lee S-h (South Korea) Shin S-c	21	25
(South Korea) Kim S-y (South Korea) Kong H-y	21	21
(Germany) J Goliszewski (Germany) L Käpplein	9	12
(Japan) A Sakuramoto (Japan) Y Takahata	18	16
3	(Japan) M Matsumoto (Japan) W Nagahara	21	21

Second Round
(China) Li WM (China) Zheng Y	21	21
6	(South Korea) Lee S-h (South Korea) Shin S-c	8	18
(South Korea) Kim S-y (South Korea) Kong H-y	22	14
3	(Japan) M Matsumoto (Japan) W Nagahara	24	21

Quarter-finals
(China) Li WM (China) Zheng Y	17	21	18
3	(Japan) M Matsumoto (Japan) W Nagahara	21	17	21

==== Section 4 ====
First Round
(India) M Jakkampudi (India) P S. Ram	21	12	12
(Russia) E Bolotova (Russia) A Davletova	18	21	21
(India) A Ponnappa (India) N. S Reddy	21	26	16
7	(Japan) S Tanaka (Japan) K Yonemoto	16	28	21
(Indonesia) N K M Istarani (Indonesia) R A Pradipta	11
(Denmark) M Fruergaard (Denmark) S Thygesen	12^{r}
(South Korea) Chang Y-n (South Korea) Jung K-e	21	10	21
2	(Japan) M Matsutomo (Japan) A Takahashi	17	21	19

Second Round
(Russia) E Bolotova (Russia) A Davletova	15	9
7	(Japan) S Tanaka (Japan) K Yonemoto	21	21
(Indonesia) N K M Istarani (Indonesia) R A Pradipta	21	21
(South Korea) Chang Y-n (South Korea) Jung K-e	13	11

Quarter-finals
7	(Japan) S Tanaka (Japan) K Yonemoto	21	21
(Indonesia) N K M Istarani (Indonesia) R A Pradipta	16	17

== Mixed doubles ==
=== Seeds ===
1. (China) Zheng Siwei / Huang Yaqiong (champions)
2. (China) Wang Yilyu / Huang Dongping (quarter-finals)
3. (Japan) Yuta Watanabe / Arisa Higashino (final)
4. (Thailand) Dechapol Puavaranukroh / Sapsiree Taerattanachai (quarter-finals)
5. (Malaysia) Chan Peng Soon / Goh Liu Ying (second round)
6. (England) Chris Adcock / Gabby Adcock (quarter-finals)
7. (England) Marcus Ellis / Lauren Smith (second round)
8. (Indonesia) Hafiz Faizal / Gloria Emanuelle Widjaja (first round)

=== Finals ===
Semi-finals
1	(China) Zheng Siwei (China) Huang Yaqiong	13	22	21
(Indonesia) Praveen Jordan (Indonesia) Melati Daeva Oktavianti	21	20	13
3	(Japan) Yuta Watanabe (Japan) Arisa Higashino	21	21
(Malaysia) Goh Soon Huat (Malaysia) Shevon Jemie Lai	16	13

Final
1	(China) Zheng Siwei (China) Huang Yaqiong	21	22
3	(Japan) Yuta Watanabe (Japan) Arisa Higashino	17	20

=== Top half ===
==== Section 1 ====
First Round
1	(China) Zheng SW (China) Huang YQ	21	21
(Russia) E Dremin (Russia) E Dimova	8	12
(Japan) K Gondo (Japan) A Kurihara	7
(Denmark) N Nøhr (Denmark) S Thygesen	3^{r}
6	(England) C Adcock (England) G Adcock	21	21
(Malaysia) Chen T J (Malaysia) Peck Y W	16	18
(England) B Lane (England) J Pugh	21	21
(Germany) M E Seidel (Germany) L Efler	13	16

Second Round
1	(China) Zheng SW (China) Huang YQ	21	21
(Japan) K Gondo (Japan) A Kurihara	10	10
6	(England) C Adcock (England) G Adcock	15	21	21
(England) B Lane (England) J Pugh	21	15	15

Quarter-finals
1	(China) Zheng SW (China) Huang YQ	21	21
6	(England) C Adcock (England) G Adcock	16	12

==== Section 2 ====
First Round
4	(Thailand) D Puavaranukroh (Thailand) S Taerattanachai	21	21
(Japan) Y Kaneko (Japan) M Matsutomo	11	15
(Russia) R Alimov (Russia) A Davletova	18	14
(Republic of Ireland) S Magee (Republic of Ireland) C Magee	21	21
8	(Indonesia) H Faizal (Indonesia) G E Widjaja	21	18	19
(Indonesia) P Jordan (Indonesia) M D Oktavianti	17	21	21
(Indonesia) R Rivaldy (Indonesia) P H Mentari	24	21	17
(Germany) M Lamsfuß (Germany) I Herttrich	22	23	21

Second Round
4	(Thailand) D Puavaranukroh (Thailand) S Taerattanachai	21	21
(Republic of Ireland) S Magee (Republic of Ireland) C Magee	9	11
(Indonesia) P Jordan (Indonesia) M D Oktavianti	21	21
(Germany) M Lamsfuß (Germany) I Herttrich	11	17

Quarter-finals
4	(Thailand) D Puavaranukroh (Thailand) S Taerattanachai	21	12	17
(Indonesia) P Jordan (Indonesia) M D Oktavianti	16	21	21

=== Bottom half ===
==== Section 3 ====
First Round
(Indonesia) T Ahmad (Indonesia) W O Kandow	21	21
(Indonesia) A E Prasetya (Indonesia) M G Islami	7	18
(Japan) T Hoki (Japan) W Nagahara	21	10	20
5	(Malaysia) Chan P S (Malaysia) Goh L Y	19	21	22
(South Korea) Seo S-j (South Korea) Chae Y-j	18	18
(China) Lu K (China) Chen L	21	21
(Denmark) M Christiansen (Denmark) C Pedersen	20	23	14
3	(Japan) Y Watanabe (Japan) A Higashino	22	21	21

Second Round
(Indonesia) T Ahmad (Indonesia) W O Kandow	21	16	23
5	(Malaysia) Chan P S (Malaysia) Goh L Y	15	21	21
(China) Lu K (China) Chen L	12	23	17
3	(Japan) Y Watanabe (Japan) A Higashino	21	21	21

Quarter-finals
(Indonesia) T Ahmad (Indonesia) W O Kandow	22	19
3	(Japan) Y Watanabe (Japan) A Higashino	24	21

==== Section 4 ====
First Round
(Indonesia) R Alexander (Indonesia) A Saufika	16	11
(Malaysia) Goh S H (Malaysia) S J Lai	21	21
(China) He JT (China) Du Y	21	19	19
7	(England) M Ellis (England) L Smith	12	21	21
(Hong Kong) Chang T C (Hong Kong) Ng W Y	23	21
(India) P Chopra (India) N. S Reddy	21	17
(Malaysia) Tan K M (Malaysia) Lai P J	21	16	12
2	(China) Wang YL (China) Huang DP	15	21	21

Second Round
(Malaysia) Goh S H (Malaysia) S J Lai	21	26
7	(England) M Ellis (England) L Smith	15	24
(Hong Kong) Chang T C (Hong Kong) Ng W Y	17	11
2	(China) Wang YL (China) Huang DP	21	21

Quarter-finals
(Malaysia) Goh S H (Malaysia) S J Lai	13	22	21
2	(China) Wang YL (China) Huang DP	21	20	18

Preceded by 2019 German Open	BWF World Tour; 2019 BWF season	Succeeded by 2019 Lingshui China Masters
