= 2026 China Open (badminton) =

Tournament details
- Dates: 21–26 July
- Edition: 35th
- Level: Super 1000
- Total prize money: US$2,000,000
- Venue: Olympic Sports Centre Gymnasium
- Location: Changzhou, Jiangsu, China

Champions
- Men's singles: (Chinese Taipei) Chou Tien-chen
- Women's singles: (Japan) Akane Yamaguchi
- Men's doubles: (Indonesia) Fajar Alfian (Indonesia) Muhammad Shohibul Fikri
- Women's doubles: (China) Liu Shengshu (China) Tan Ning
- Mixed doubles: (China) Guo Xinwa (China) Chen Fanghui

The 2026 China Open (officially known as the Victor China Open 2026 for sponsorship reasons) was a badminton tournament that took place at Olympic Sports Centre Gymnasium in Changzhou, Jiangsu, China from 21 to 26 July 2026 and had a total prize of $2,000,000.

== Tournament ==
The 2026 China Open was the twentieth tournament of the 2026 BWF World Tour and also part of the China Open championships, which had been held since 1986. This tournament was organized by Chinese Badminton Association, and sanctioned by the BWF.

=== Venue ===
The tournament was held at Olympic Sports Centre Gymnasium in Changzhou, Jiangsu, China.

=== Point distribution ===
Below is the tables with the point distribution for each phase of the tournament based on the new BWF points system for the BWF World Tour Super 1000 event.

Winner	Runner-up	3/4	5/8	9/16	17/32
13,500	11,500	9,500	7,400	5,400	3,300

=== Prize money ===
The total prize money for this year tournament was US$2,000,000. Distribution of prize money was in accordance with BWF regulations.

Event	Winner	Finalist	Semi-finals	Quarter-finals	Last 16	Last 32
Singles	$140,000	$68,000	$28,000	$11,000	$6,000	$2,000
Doubles	$148,000	$70,000	$28,000	$12,500	$6,500	$2,000

== Men's singles ==
=== Seeds ===
1. (China) Shi Yuqi (quarter-finals)
2. (Thailand) Kunlavut Vitidsarn (first round)
3. (Denmark) Anders Antonsen (first round)
4. (Indonesia) Jonatan Christie (quarter-finals)
5. (France) Christo Popov (second round)
6. (Chinese Taipei) Chou Tien-chen (champion)
7. (China) Li Shifeng (first round)
8. (Canada) Victor Lai (semi-finals)

=== Finals ===
Semi-finals
6	(Chinese Taipei) Chou Tien-chen	21	21
(Chinese Taipei) Lin Chun-yi	18	17
8	(Canada) Victor Lai	21	12	15
(France) Toma Junior Popov	14	21	21

Final
6	(Chinese Taipei) Chou Tien-chen	21	7	21
(France) Toma Junior Popov	15	21	13

=== Top half ===
==== Section 1 ====
First round
1	(China) Shi YQ	18	6
(Singapore) J Teh	21	2^{r}
(Thailand) Pan Teeraratsakul	21	21
(Japan) K Watanabe	19	19
6	(Chinese Taipei) Chou T-c	21	21
(Canada) B Yang	11	9
(Japan) K Naraoka	21	21
(Hong Kong) Ng K L	15	16

Second round
1	(China) Shi YQ	17	21	12
(Thailand) Pan Teeraratsakul	21	2	6^{r}
6	(Chinese Taipei) Chou T-c	21	21
(Japan) K Naraoka	13	15

Quarter-finals
1	(China) Shi YQ	14	21	15
6	(Chinese Taipei) Chou T-c	21	12	21

==== Section 2 ====
First round
3	(Denmark) A Antonsen	21	17	20
(China) Weng HY	15	21	22
(Malaysia) Leong J H	21	21
(India) Prannoy H. S.	10	14
5	(France) C Popov	21	8	21
(Hong Kong) Lee C Y	7	21	14
(China) Lu GZ	18	16
(Chinese Taipei) Lin C-y	21	21

Second round
(China) Weng HY	20	21	21
(Malaysia) Leong J H	22	11	18
5	(France) C Popov	18	13
(Chinese Taipei) Lin C-y	21	21

Quarter-finals
(China) Weng HY	25	14
(Chinese Taipei) Lin C-y	27	21

=== Bottom half ===
==== Section 3 ====
First round
(India) L Sen	22	15	21
(Japan) Y Tanaka	20	21	14
(Chinese Taipei) Chi Y-j	24	14	10
8	(Canada) V Lai	22	21	21
(Singapore) Loh K Y	21	21
(Japan) K Nishimoto	10	10
(Japan) Y Okimoto	17	21	13
4	(Indonesia) J Christie	21	6	21

Second round
(India) L Sen	19	11
8	(Canada) V Lai	21	21
(Singapore) Loh K Y	21	6	13
4	(Indonesia) J Christie	12	21	21

Quarter-finals
8	(Canada) V Lai	21	21
4	(Indonesia) J Christie	14	17

==== Section 4 ====
First round
(Indonesia) A Farhan	17	21	17
(India) A Shetty	21	5	21
(Republic of Ireland) N Nguyen	21	14	21
7	(China) Li SF	12	21	18
(France) T J Popov	21	15	21
(Chinese Taipei) Lee C-h	14	21	17
(Denmark) R Gemke	21	8	21
2	(Thailand) K Vitidsarn	13	21	19

Second round
(India) A Shetty	21	13	20
(Republic of Ireland) N Nguyen	15	21	22
(France) T J Popov	21	21
(Denmark) R Gemke	10	19

Quarter-finals
(Republic of Ireland) N Nguyen	21	10	15
(France) T J Popov	12	21	21

== Women's singles ==
=== Seeds ===
1. (South Korea) An Se-young (withdrew)
2. (China) Wang Zhiyi (semi-finals)
3. (Japan) Akane Yamaguchi (champion)
4. (China) Chen Yufei (final)
5. (China) Han Yue (quarter-finals)
6. (Indonesia) Putri Kusuma Wardani (quarter-finals)
7. (Thailand) Ratchanok Intanon (quarter-finals)
8. (Thailand) Pornpawee Chochuwong (first round)

=== Finals ===
Semi-finals
4	(China) Chen Yufei	21	21
SWM	(Japan) Tomoka Miyazaki	17	15
3	(Japan) Akane Yamaguchi	21	6	21
2	(China) Wang Zhiyi	10	21	16

Final
4	(China) Chen Yufei	18	16
3	(Japan) Akane Yamaguchi	21	21

=== Top half ===
==== Section 1 ====
First round
4	(China) Chen YF	19	21	21
(Japan) N Nidaira	21	19	18
(India) U Hooda	14	21	10
(India) P. V. Sindhu	21	9	21
7	(Thailand) R Intanon	21	12	21
(Canada) M Li	12	21	11
(Vietnam) Nguyễn T L	21	10	21
(Japan) H Akechi	10	21	14

Second round
4	(China) Chen YF	16	22	21
(India) P. V. Sindhu	21	20	18
7	(Thailand) R Intanon	17	21	21
(Vietnam) Nguyễn T L	21	16	15

Quarter-finals
4	(China) Chen YF	15	21	21
7	(Thailand) R Intanon	21	12	13

==== Section 2 ====
First round
6	(Indonesia) P K Wardani	21	21
PFR	(China) Han QX	16	16
(Thailand) B Ongbamrungphan	21	19	21
(India) D Sihag	19	21	13
SWM	(Japan) T Miyazaki	16	21	21
(Denmark) L Kjærsfeldt	21	7	11
(Malaysia) Letshanaa K	16	15
(United States) BW Zhang	21	21

Second round
6	(Indonesia) P K Wardani	21	21
(Thailand) B Ongbamrungphan	17	14
SWM	(Japan) T Miyazaki	w	/	o
(United States) BW Zhang

Quarter-finals
6	(Indonesia) P K Wardani	21	11	9
SWM	(Japan) T Miyazaki	16	21	21

=== Bottom half ===
==== Section 3 ====
First round
(Chinese Taipei) Lin H-t	12	21	22
(Thailand) P Opatniputh	21	16	20
(Turkey) N Arın	21	7	13
5	(China) Han Y	18	21	21
(Japan) R Gunji	21	21
PFR	(Chinese Taipei) Sung S-y	13	12
(Thailand) S Katethong	13	1
3	(Japan) A Yamaguchi	21	21

Second round
(Chinese Taipei) Lin H-t	7	13
5	(China) Han Y	21	21
(Japan) R Gunji	10	6
3	(Japan) A Yamaguchi	21	21

Quarter-finals
5	(China) Han Y	16	21	17
3	(Japan) A Yamaguchi	21	14	21

==== Section 4 ====
First round
(South Korea) Kim G-e	21	12	21
(Chinese Taipei) Chiu P-c	12	21	19
(Chinese Taipei) Huang Y-h	11
8	(Thailand) P Chochuwong	8^{r}
(Malaysia) Wong L C	21	16	17
(South Korea) Sim Y-j	17	21	21
(Scotland) K Gilmour	21	5	18
2	(China) Wang ZY	15	21	21

Second round
(South Korea) Kim G-e	21	21
(Chinese Taipei) Huang Y-h	12	17
(South Korea) Sim Y-j	16	15
2	(China) Wang ZY	21	21

Quarter-finals
(South Korea) Kim G-e	18	14
2	(China) Wang ZY	21	21

== Men's doubles ==
=== Seeds ===
1. (South Korea) Kim Won-ho / Seo Seung-jae (final)
2. (Indonesia) Fajar Alfian / Muhammad Shohibul Fikri (champions)
3. (India) Satwiksairaj Rankireddy / Chirag Shetty (withdrew)
4. (China) Liang Weikeng / Wang Chang (semi-finals)
5. (Malaysia) Goh Sze Fei / Nur Izzuddin (second round)
6. (Indonesia) Sabar Karyaman Gutama / Muhammad Reza Pahlevi Isfahani (second round)
7. (China) Chen Boyang / Liu Yi (quarter-finals)
8. (Japan) Takuro Hoki / Yugo Kobayashi (second round)

=== Finals ===
Semi-finals
1	(South Korea) Kim Won-ho (South Korea) Seo Seung-jae	21	21
(England) Ben Lane (England) Sean Vendy	19	13
4	(China) Liang Weikeng (China) Wang Chang	19	21	19
2	(Indonesia) Fajar Alfian (Indonesia) Muhammad Shohibul Fikri	21	14	21

Final
1	(South Korea) Kim Won-ho (South Korea) Seo Seung-jae	21	19	19
2	(Indonesia) Fajar Alfian (Indonesia) Muhammad Shohibul Fikri	16	21	21

=== Top half ===
==== Section 1 ====
First round
1	(South Korea) Kim W-h (South Korea) Seo S-j	22	21
(Chinese Taipei) Lee J-h (Chinese Taipei) Yang P-h	20	18
(Malaysia) N M Azriyn A (Malaysia) Tan W K	25	21
(Malaysia) Tee K W (Malaysia) Yap R K	23	17
7	(China) Chen BY (China) Liu Yi	21	21
(Scotland) C Grimley (Scotland) M Grimley	6	14
(Indonesia) R Indra (Indonesia) N Joaquin	21	19	21
(Chinese Taipei) Lee F-j (Chinese Taipei) Lee F-c	13	21	16

Second round
1	(South Korea) Kim W-h (South Korea) Seo S-j	21	21
(Malaysia) N M Azriyn A (Malaysia) Tan W K	13	19
7	(China) Chen BY (China) Liu Yi	21	21
(Indonesia) R Indra (Indonesia) N Joaquin	13	17

Quarter-finals
1	(South Korea) Kim W-h (South Korea) Seo S-j	21	21
7	(China) Chen BY (China) Liu Yi	13	17

==== Section 2 ====
First round
6	(Indonesia) S K Gutama (Indonesia) M R P Isfahani	21	21
(Malaysia) A Chia (Malaysia) A Tai	17	19
(England) B Lane (England) S Vendy	21	21
PFR	(Canada) K Lee (Canada) T A Lindeman	7	11
SWM	(Malaysia) Man W C (Malaysia) Soh W Y	21	21
(Malaysia) J Arif (Malaysia) Kang K X	12	15
(Chinese Taipei) Chiu H-c (Chinese Taipei) Wang C-l	6	23	11
(Japan) K Kumagai (Japan) H Nishi	21	21	21

Second round
6	(Indonesia) S K Gutama (Indonesia) M R P Isfahani	18	12
(England) B Lane (England) S Vendy	21	21
SWM	(Malaysia) Man W C (Malaysia) Soh W Y	16	17
(Japan) K Kumagai (Japan) H Nishi	21	21

Quarter-finals
(England) B Lane (England) S Vendy	21	18	21
(Japan) K Kumagai (Japan) H Nishi	9	21	17

=== Bottom half ===
==== Section 3 ====
First round
(China) Hu KY (China) Lin XY	18	22	16
(Denmark) D Lundgaard (Denmark) M Vestergaard	21	20	21
(Chinese Taipei) Chen Z-r (Chinese Taipei) Lin Y-c	21	15	16
5	(Malaysia) Goh S F (Malaysia) N Izzuddin	15	21	21
(China) He JT (China) Ren XY
(South Korea) Choi S-g (Malaysia) Goh V S	w	/	o
(India) H Amsakarunan (India) Arjun M. R.	16	7
4	(China) Liang WK (China) Wang C	21	21

Second round
(Denmark) D Lundgaard (Denmark) M Vestergaard	21	12	21
5	(Malaysia) Goh S F (Malaysia) N Izzuddin	19	21	19
(South Korea) Choi S-g (Malaysia) Goh V S	20	11
4	(China) Liang WK (China) Wang C	22	21

Quarter-finals
(Denmark) D Lundgaard (Denmark) M Vestergaard	11	20
4	(China) Liang WK (China) Wang C	21	22

==== Section 4 ====
First round
(South Korea) Kang M-h (South Korea) Ki D-j	21	13	21
(Denmark) K Astrup (Denmark) A S Rasmussen	10	21	19
(France) C Popov (France) T J Popov	12	23
8	(Japan) T Hoki (Japan) Y Kobayashi	21	25
(Japan) T Nomura (Japan) Y Shimogami	21	21
(United States) Chen Z-y (United States) P Smith	19	18
(China) Huang D (China) Liu Ya	15	22	9
2	(Indonesia) F Alfian (Indonesia) M S Fikri	21	20	21

Second round
(South Korea) Kang M-h (South Korea) Ki D-j	21	15	21
8	(Japan) T Hoki (Japan) Y Kobayashi	15	21	10
(Japan) T Nomura (Japan) Y Shimogami	19	11
2	(Indonesia) F Alfian (Indonesia) M S Fikri	21	21

Quarter-finals
(South Korea) Kang M-h (South Korea) Ki D-j	15	13
2	(Indonesia) F Alfian (Indonesia) M S Fikri	21	21

== Women's doubles ==
=== Seeds ===
1. (China) Liu Shengshu / Tan Ning (champions)
2. (China) Jia Yifan / Zhang Shuxian (first round)
3. (South Korea) Baek Ha-na / Lee So-hee (semi-finals)
4. (Japan) Yuki Fukushima / Mayu Matsumoto (final)
5. (Malaysia) Pearly Tan / Thinaah Muralitharan (quarter-finals)
6. (South Korea) Kim Hye-jeong / Kong Hee-yong (second round)
7. (Japan) Rin Iwanaga / Kie Nakanishi (quarter-finals)
8. (China) Li Yijing / Luo Xumin (semi-finals)

=== Finals ===
Semi-finals
1	(China) Liu Shengshu (China) Tan Ning	21	21
3	(South Korea) Baek Ha-na (South Korea) Lee So-hee	9	10
4	(Japan) Yuki Fukushima (Japan) Mayu Matsumoto	14	21	21
8	(China) Li Yijing (China) Luo Xumin	21	9	15

Final
1	(China) Liu Shengshu (China) Tan Ning	21	21
4	(Japan) Yuki Fukushima (Japan) Mayu Matsumoto	14	19

=== Top half ===
==== Section 1 ====
First round
1	(China) Liu SS (China) Tan N	21	22
(Chinese Taipei) Lin C-c (Chinese Taipei) Yang C-y	12	20
(Malaysia) Ong X Y (Malaysia) C Ting	23	20	14
(Chinese Taipei) Hu L-f (Chinese Taipei) Jheng Y-c	21	22	21
6	(South Korea) Kim H-j (South Korea) Kong H-y	17	22	21
(Indonesia) F D Kusuma (Indonesia) M T Puspita Sari	21	20	13
(United States) F Corbett (United States) J Gai	21	19	19
(Thailand) B Aimsaard (Thailand) N Aimsaard	19	21	21

Second round
1	(China) Liu SS (China) Tan N	21	21
(Chinese Taipei) Hu L-f (Chinese Taipei) Jheng Y-c	13	8
6	(South Korea) Kim H-j (South Korea) Kong H-y	19	9
(Thailand) B Aimsaard (Thailand) N Aimsaard	21	21

Quarter-finals
1	(China) Liu SS (China) Tan N	21	21
(Thailand) B Aimsaard (Thailand) N Aimsaard	9	8

==== Section 2 ====
First round
3	(South Korea) Baek H-n (South Korea) Lee S-h	18	21	21
(Chinese Taipei) Chang C-h (Chinese Taipei) Yang C-t	21	12	12
(Japan) S Hirota (Japan) A Sakuramoto	21	21
(Indonesia) A C Pratiwi (Indonesia) S F S Ramadhanti	16	4
7	(Japan) R Iwanaga (Japan) K Nakanishi	21	21
(Bulgaria) G Stoeva (Bulgaria) S Stoeva	14	15
(Turkey) B Erçetin (Turkey) N İnci	21	16	22
(Chinese Taipei) Hsieh P-s (Chinese Taipei) Hung E-t	18	21	20

Second round
3	(South Korea) Baek H-n (South Korea) Lee S-h	21	21
(Japan) S Hirota (Japan) A Sakuramoto	13	11
7	(Japan) R Iwanaga (Japan) K Nakanishi	21	21
(Turkey) B Erçetin (Turkey) N İnci	10	11

Quarter-finals
3	(South Korea) Baek H-n (South Korea) Lee S-h	21	26
7	(Japan) R Iwanaga (Japan) K Nakanishi	8	24

=== Bottom half ===
==== Section 3 ====
First round
(Japan) R Hirokami (Japan) S Hobara	21	21	19
(Ukraine) P Buhrova (Ukraine) Y Kantemyr	13	23	21
(Japan) R Hiramoto (Japan) K Ishikawa	16	12
5	(Malaysia) P Tan (Malaysia) Thinaah M	21	21
(Japan) K Osawa (Japan) M Tanabe	15	14
(Japan) H Suzuki (Japan) N Yamakita	21	21
(Chinese Taipei) Hsu Y-h (Chinese Taipei) Lin J-y	19	15
4	(Japan) Y Fukushima (Japan) M Matsumoto	21	21

Second round
(Ukraine) P Buhrova (Ukraine) Y Kantemyr	19	12
5	(Malaysia) P Tan (Malaysia) Thinaah M	21	21
(Japan) H Suzuki (Japan) N Yamakita	16	10
4	(Japan) Y Fukushima (Japan) M Matsumoto	21	21

Quarter-finals
5	(Malaysia) P Tan (Malaysia) Thinaah M	16	16
4	(Japan) Y Fukushima (Japan) M Matsumoto	21	21

==== Section 4 ====
First round
(Hong Kong) Yeung N T (Hong Kong) Yeung P L	19	21	21
(Hong Kong) Lui L L (Hong Kong) Tsang H Y	21	8	10
(China) Luo Y (China) Wang TG	21	21	18
8	(China) Li YJ (China) Luo XM	23	18	21
(Chinese Taipei) Hsu Y-c (Chinese Taipei) Sung Y-h	16	21	8
(United States) L Lam (United States) A Lee	21	7	21
(Indonesia) R A Rose (Indonesia) F Setianingrum	24	21
2	(China) Jia YF (China) Zhang SX	22	17

Second round
(Hong Kong) Yeung N T (Hong Kong) Yeung P L	16	11
8	(China) Li YJ (China) Luo XM	21	21
(United States) L Lam (United States) A Lee	21	11	19
(Indonesia) R A Rose (Indonesia) F Setianingrum	17	21	21

Quarter-finals
8	(China) Li YJ (China) Luo XM	21	21
(Indonesia) R A Rose (Indonesia) F Setianingrum	18	18

== Mixed doubles ==
=== Seeds ===
1. (China) Feng Yanzhe / Huang Dongping (final)
2. (China) Jiang Zhenbang / Wei Yaxin (quarter-finals)
3. (Denmark) Mathias Christiansen / Alexandra Bøje (quarter-finals)
4. (Thailand) Dechapol Puavaranukroh / Supissara Paewsampran (semi-finals)
5. (China) Guo Xinwa / Chen Fanghui (champions)
6. (France) Thom Gicquel / Delphine Delrue (semi-finals)
7. (Hong Kong) Tang Chun Man / Tse Ying Suet (first round)
8. (China) Cheng Xing / Zhang Chi (second round)

=== Finals ===
Semi-finals
1	(China) Feng Yanzhe (China) Huang Dongping	21	21
6	(France) Thom Gicquel (France) Delphine Delrue	19	14
4	(Thailand) Dechapol Puavaranukroh (Thailand) Supissara Paewsampran	21	19
5	(China) Guo Xinwa (China) Chen Fanghui	23	21

Final
1	(China) Feng Yanzhe (China) Huang Dongping	23	22	15
5	(China) Guo Xinwa (China) Chen Fanghui	25	20	21

=== Top half ===
==== Section 1 ====
First round
1	(China) Feng YZ (China) Huang DP	21	21
(India) R Kapoor (India) R Gadde	9	16
(China) Gao JX (China) Wu MY	21	15	24
(Thailand) R Oupthong (Thailand) J Sudjaipraparat	19	21	22
7	(Hong Kong) Tang C M (Hong Kong) Tse Y S	18	21	19
(Japan) Y Shimogami (Japan) S Hobara	21	19	21
(United States) Chen Z-y (United States) F Corbett	24	14	13
(Chinese Taipei) Yang P-h (Chinese Taipei) Hu L-f	22	21	21

Second round
1	(China) Feng YZ (China) Huang DP	21	21
(China) Gao JX (China) Wu MY	10	13
(Japan) Y Shimogami (Japan) S Hobara	21	15	19
(Chinese Taipei) Yang P-h (Chinese Taipei) Hu L-f	14	21	21

Quarter-finals
1	(China) Feng YZ (China) Huang DP	21	21
(Chinese Taipei) Yang P-h (Chinese Taipei) Hu L-f	15	11

==== Section 2 ====
First round
3	(Denmark) M Christiansen (Denmark) A Bøje	21	21
(Malaysia) Wong T C (Malaysia) Lim C S	18	13
(Indonesia) R N Kusharjanto (Indonesia) G E Widjaja	22	23	21
(Scotland) A Dunn (Scotland) J MacPherson	20	25	14
6	(France) T Gicquel (France) D Delrue	21	21
(China) Zhu YJ (China) Li Q	13	7
(Thailand) Pak Teeraratsakul (Thailand) S Taerattanachai	21	21
(Chinese Taipei) Wu G-x (Chinese Taipei) Lee C-h	8	13

Second round
3	(Denmark) M Christiansen (Denmark) A Bøje	21	21
(Indonesia) R N Kusharjanto (Indonesia) G E Widjaja	8	14
6	(France) T Gicquel (France) D Delrue	21	21
(Thailand) Pak Teeraratsakul (Thailand) S Taerattanachai	11	19

Quarter-finals
3	(Denmark) M Christiansen (Denmark) A Bøje	22	16
6	(France) T Gicquel (France) D Delrue	24	21

=== Bottom half ===
==== Section 3 ====
First round
(England) C Hemming (England) E van Leeuwen	15	21	16
(Japan) Y Watanabe (Japan) M Taguchi	21	16	21
(Hong Kong) Chan Y C (Hong Kong) Ng T Y	19	10
8	(China) Cheng X (China) Zhang C	21	21
(Chinese Taipei) Ye H-w (Chinese Taipei) N G Chan	21	21
PFR	(South Korea) Kim J-h (South Korea) Jang H-j	19	14
(Indonesia) A Syahnawi (Indonesia) N V Marwah	13	16
4	(Thailand) D Puavaranukroh (Thailand) S Paewsampran	21	21

Second round
(Japan) Y Watanabe (Japan) M Taguchi	21	21
8	(China) Cheng X (China) Zhang C	15	13
(Chinese Taipei) Ye H-w (Chinese Taipei) N G Chan	19	11
4	(Thailand) D Puavaranukroh (Thailand) S Paewsampran	21	21

Quarter-finals
(Japan) Y Watanabe (Japan) M Taguchi	11	21	19
4	(Thailand) D Puavaranukroh (Thailand) S Paewsampran	21	19	21

==== Section 4 ====
First round
(Japan) H Midorikawa (Japan) M Matsutomo	15	21	19
(Malaysia) Goh S H (Malaysia) S J Lai	21	16	21
(India) D Kapila (India) T Crasto	18	18
5	(China) Guo XW (China) Chen FH	21	21
(Germany) M Seidel (Germany) T P Nguyen	17	19
(Malaysia) Chen T J (Malaysia) C San	21	21
(United States) P Smith (United States) J Gai	21	19	19
2	(China) Jiang ZB (China) Wei YX	18	21	21

Second round
(Malaysia) Goh S H (Malaysia) S J Lai	21	15
5	(China) Guo XW (China) Chen FH	23	21
(Malaysia) Chen T J (Malaysia) C San	21	14	19
2	(China) Jiang ZB (China) Wei YX	11	21	21

Quarter-finals
5	(China) Guo XW (China) Chen FH	14	21	21
2	(China) Jiang ZB (China) Wei YX	21	18	18

Preceded by 2026 Japan Open	BWF World Tour; 2026 BWF season	Succeeded by 2026 Taipei Open
