= BWF World Tour Super 1000 =

Highest regular tier of the BWF World Tour

The BWF World Tour Super 1000 is the highest tier of regular badminton tournaments on the BWF World Tour. Classified by the Badminton World Federation (BWF) as a Level 2 event within the Grade 2 tour structure, it sits immediately below the season-ending BWF World Tour Finals. Among regular World Tour events, Super 1000 tournaments offer the highest world-ranking points and the largest minimum prize pools.

Introduced in 2018, the category originally comprised three tournaments: the All England Open, the China Open, and the Indonesia Open. The category expanded to four tournaments with the promotion of the Malaysia Open for the 2023–2026 cycle, and will expand to five when the Denmark Open joins the tier in 2027.

== History ==
Established in 2018, the BWF World Tour replaced the BWF Super Series. Under this structure, three former Superseries Premier events became the inaugural Super 1000 tournaments.

The initial 2018–2021 hosting cycle was extended through 2022 due to calendar disruptions caused by the COVID-19 pandemic. The Thailand Open (I) and Thailand Open (II) were staged in Bangkok in January 2021 as temporary Super 1000 events to complete the delayed 2020 season. The Denmark Open was also temporarily upgraded from Super 750 status for the 2021 season.

The regular Super 1000 programme expanded from three to four tournaments for the 2023–2026 cycle following the promotion of the Malaysia Open. In February 2026, the BWF announced that the Denmark Open would be promoted to Super 1000 status for the 2027–2030 cycle.

== Tournament structure and regulations ==
Through 2026, Super 1000 tournaments are held over six days. They feature a straight knockout format with no qualifying rounds, with 32-player or 32-pair main draws across five disciplines: men's singles, women's singles, men's doubles, women's doubles, and mixed doubles.

Beginning in 2027, Super 1000 events will expand to 11 days spanning two weekends. Singles competitions will feature 48-player draws beginning with a group stage before advancing to the knockout stage, while doubles events will retain a 32-pair straight knockout draw.

Under BWF player commitment regulations for the 2023–2026 cycle, the top 15 singles players and top 10 doubles pairs in the BWF world rankings are required to enter all Super 1000 events, subject to official exemptions.

== Ranking points and prize money ==
=== Ranking points ===
A standard Super 1000 tournament awards 12,000 world-ranking points to the winner. In April 2024, the BWF introduced enhanced ranking-point scales for events offering prize money above the mandatory minimum threshold.

Super 1000 world-ranking points as of August 2026
Prize-money provision	Winner	Runner-up	Semi-finals	Quarter-finals	Round of 16	Round of 32
Standard Super 1000	12,000	10,200	8,400	6,600	4,800	3,000
US$250,000–499,999 above minimum	12,700	10,800	9,000	7,000	5,100	3,150
At least US$500,000 above minimum	13,500	11,500	9,500	7,400	5,400	3,300

=== Prize money ===
At its introduction in 2018, Super 1000 tournaments were required to offer a minimum prize pool of US$1 million. The minimum was subsequently raised to US$1.1 million, temporarily reduced to US$850,000 for the pandemic-affected 2021 season, and increased to US$1.45 million by 2026. From 2027 onward, the minimum prize pool will be set at US$2 million per tournament.

== Tournaments ==
=== Tournaments by cycle ===
Cycle	No.	Tournaments	Changes from previous cycle
2018–2022	3	All England Open; China Open; Indonesia Open	Inaugural World Tour cycle; the original hosting agreements were extended through 2022.
2023–2026	4	All England Open; China Open; Indonesia Open; Malaysia Open	The Malaysia Open was promoted from Super 750 to Super 1000 status.
2027–2030	5	All England Open; China Open; Denmark Open; Indonesia Open; Malaysia Open	The Denmark Open was promoted from Super 750 to Super 1000 status.

=== Seasonal exceptions ===
To accommodate calendar disruptions caused by the COVID-19 pandemic, three tournaments temporarily held Super 1000 status for specific seasons. In addition, several scheduled tournaments were cancelled during this period: the China Open was cancelled from 2020 through 2022, and the Indonesia Open was cancelled in 2020.

Season	Tournament	Circumstance
2020	Thailand Open (I)	Designated as Super 1000 tournaments as part of the delayed Asian leg of the 2020 World Tour in Bangkok; both were played in January 2021.
2020	Thailand Open (II)	Designated as Super 1000 tournaments as part of the delayed Asian leg of the 2020 World Tour in Bangkok; both were played in January 2021.
2021	Denmark Open	Temporarily upgraded from Super 750 to Super 1000.

== Titles by country ==
As of the 2026 China Open

The following table lists the total number of Super 1000 titles won by players from each country.

Rank	Country	MS	WS	MD	WD	XD	Total
1	China	7	6	4	12	15	44
2	Japan	3	6	3	11	5	28
3	South Korea	0	9	5	5	1	20
4	Indonesia	2	0	12	1	2	17
5	Denmark	12	0	1	1	1	15
6	Chinese Taipei	3	4	2	0	1	10
7	Spain	0	5	0	0	0	5
7	Thailand	1	0	0	0	4	5
9	Malaysia	1	0	2	0	0	3
10	Canada	1	0	0	0	0	1
10	France	0	0	0	0	1	1
10	India	0	0	1	0	0	1
Total		30	30	30	30	30	150

== See also ==
- BWF World Tour
- List of BWF World Tour Super 1000 winners
- BWF World Tour Super 750
- BWF World Tour Super 500
- List of BWF Super Series winners
- BWF World Ranking
- BWF World Tour Finals
