= 2024 Badminton Asia Championships =

Badminton tournament in China

Tournament details
- Dates: 9–14 April
- Edition: 41st
- Total prize money: US$450,000
- Venue: Ningbo Olympic Sports Center Gymnasium
- Location: Ningbo, China

Champions
- Men's singles: (Indonesia) Jonatan Christie
- Women's singles: (China) Wang Zhiyi
- Men's doubles: (China) Liang Weikeng (China) Wang Chang
- Women's doubles: (South Korea) Baek Ha-na (South Korea) Lee So-hee
- Mixed doubles: (China) Feng Yanzhe (China) Huang Dongping

The 2024 Badminton Asia Championships (officially known as the Bank of Ningbo Badminton Asia Championships 2024 for sponsorship reasons) was a badminton tournament that took place at the Ningbo Olympic Sports Center Gymnasium, Ningbo, China, from 9 to 14 April 2024 and had a total prize of US$450,000.

== Tournament ==
The 2024 Badminton Asia Championships was the 41st edition of the Badminton Asia Championships. This tournament was organized by Badminton Asia and hosted by the Chinese Badminton Association.

=== Venue ===
This tournament was held at the Ningbo Olympic Sports Center Gymnasium in Ningbo, China.

=== Point distribution ===
Below is the point distribution table for each phase of the tournament based on the BWF points system for the Badminton Asia Championships, which is equivalent to a BWF World Tour Super 1000.

| Winner | Runner-up | 3/4 | 5/8 | 9/16 | 17/32 | 33/64 |
|---|---|---|---|---|---|---|
| 12,000 | 10,200 | 8,400 | 6,600 | 4,800 | 3,000 | 1,200 |

=== Prize pool ===
The total prize money is US$450,000 with the distribution of the prize money in accordance with BWF regulations.

| Event | Winner | Finalist | Semi-finals | Quarter-finals | Last 16 | Last 32 |
| Singles | $31,500 | $15,300 | $6,300 | $2,475 | $1,350 | $450 |
| Doubles | $33,300 | $15,750 | $6,300 | $2,812.5 | $1,462.5 | $450 |

== Medal summary ==
=== Medalists ===
| Event | Gold | Silver | Bronze |
|---|---|---|---|
| Men's singles | (Indonesia) Jonatan Christie | (China) Li Shifeng | (China) Shi Yuqi |
| Men's singles | (Indonesia) Jonatan Christie | (China) Li Shifeng | (Japan) Kodai Naraoka |
| Women's singles | (China) Wang Zhiyi | (China) Chen Yufei | (China) He Bingjiao |
| Women's singles | (China) Wang Zhiyi | (China) Chen Yufei | (China) Han Yue |
| Men's doubles | (China) Liang Weikeng (China) Wang Chang | (Malaysia) Goh Sze Fei (Malaysia) Nur Izzuddin | (Chinese Taipei) Lee Jhe-huei (Chinese Taipei) Yang Po-hsuan |
| Men's doubles | (China) Liang Weikeng (China) Wang Chang | (Malaysia) Goh Sze Fei (Malaysia) Nur Izzuddin | (Malaysia) Aaron Chia (Malaysia) Soh Wooi Yik |
| Women's doubles | (South Korea) Baek Ha-na (South Korea) Lee So-hee | (China) Zhang Shuxian (China) Zheng Yu | (China) Chen Qingchen (China) Jia Yifan |
| Women's doubles | (South Korea) Baek Ha-na (South Korea) Lee So-hee | (China) Zhang Shuxian (China) Zheng Yu | (China) Liu Shengshu (China) Tan Ning |
| Mixed doubles | (China) Feng Yanzhe (China) Huang Dongping | (South Korea) Seo Seung-jae (South Korea) Chae Yoo-jung | (China) Zheng Siwei (China) Huang Yaqiong |
| Mixed doubles | (China) Feng Yanzhe (China) Huang Dongping | (South Korea) Seo Seung-jae (South Korea) Chae Yoo-jung | (China) Jiang Zhenbang (China) Wei Yaxin |

=== Medal table ===
* Host nation (China)

| Rank | Nation | Gold | Silver | Bronze | Total |
|---|---|---|---|---|---|
| 1 | China* | 3 | 3 | 7 | 13 |
| 2 | South Korea | 1 | 1 | 0 | 2 |
| 3 | Indonesia | 1 | 0 | 0 | 1 |
| 4 | Malaysia | 0 | 1 | 1 | 2 |
| 5 | Chinese Taipei | 0 | 0 | 1 | 1 |
| 5 | Japan | 0 | 0 | 1 | 1 |
| Totals (6 entries) | | 5 | 5 | 10 | 20 |

== Qualification ==
=== Final standings ===
| Group | Men's singles | Women's singles | Men's doubles | Women's doubles | Mixed doubles |
|---|---|---|---|---|---|
| A | (Nepal) Prince Dahal | (Hong Kong) Lo Sin Yan | (India) Hariharan Amsakarunan (India) Ruban Kumar Rethinasabapathi | (India) Rutaparna Panda (India) Swetaparna Panda | (India) Sathish Karunakaran (India) Aadya Variyath |
| B | (Macau) Pui Pang Fong | (India) Malvika Bansod | (Thailand) Pongsakorn Thongkham (Thailand) Wongsathorn Thongkham | (Chinese Taipei) Hu Ling-fang (Chinese Taipei) Lin Xiao-min | (United Arab Emirates) Kuswanto (United Arab Emirates) Sreeyuktha Sreejith Parol |
| C | (Saudi Arabia) Mahd Shaikh | (Sri Lanka) Ranithma Liyanage | (United Arab Emirates) Dev Ayyappan (United Arab Emirates) Dhiren Ayyappan | (India) Simran Singhi (India) Ritika Thaker | (Vietnam) Phạm Văn Hải (Vietnam) Thân Văn Anh |
| D | (Philippines) Jewel Albo | (Macau) Pui Chi Wa | (Vietnam) Nguyễn Đình Hoàng (Vietnam) Trần Đình Mạnh | (Hong Kong) Fan Ka Yan (Hong Kong) Yau Mau Ying | (Thailand) Pakkapon Teeraratsakul (Thailand) Phataimas Muenwong |

== Men's singles ==
=== Seeds ===
1. (China) Shi Yuqi (semi-finals)
2. (Indonesia) Anthony Sinisuka Ginting (quarter-finals)
3. (Indonesia) Jonatan Christie (champion)
4. (Japan) Kodai Naraoka (semi-finals)
5. (China) Li Shifeng (final)
6. (Thailand) Kunlavut Vitidsarn (quarter-finals)
7. (India) Prannoy H. S. (second round)
8. (Malaysia) Lee Zii Jia (quarter-finals)

=== Finals ===
Semi-finals
1 | (China) Shi Yuqi | 21 | 19 | 12
3 | (Indonesia) Jonatan Christie | 18 | 21 | 21
4 | (Japan) Kodai Naraoka | 21 | 15 | 12
5 | (China) Li Shifeng | 14 | 21 | 21

Final
3 | (Indonesia) Jonatan Christie | 21 | 21
5 | (China) Li Shifeng | 15 | 16

=== Top half ===
==== Section 1 ====
First round
1 | (China) Shi YQ | 21 | 21
(India) L Sen | 19 | 15
(Singapore) Loh K Y | 21 | 18 | 17
(Japan) K Nishimoto | 18 | 21 | 21
6 | (Thailand) K Vitidsarn | 21 | 21
A1 | (Nepal) P Dahal | 3 | 11
(Sri Lanka) V Nettasinghe | 12 | 18
(Vietnam) Nguyễn H Đ | 21 | 21

Second round
1 | (China) Shi YQ | 21 | 21
(Japan) K Nishimoto | 15 | 15
6 | (Thailand) K Vitidsarn | 21 | 21
(Vietnam) Nguyễn H Đ | 7 | 3

Quarter-finals
1 | (China) Shi YQ | 22 | 21
6 | (Thailand) K Vitidsarn | 20 | 13

==== Section 2 ====
First round
3 | (Indonesia) J Christie | 21 | 21
D1 | (Philippines) J Albo | 12 | 12
(Japan) K Watanabe | 16 | 18
(Hong Kong) Lee C Y | 21 | 21
8 | (Malaysia) Lee Z J | 21 | 21
(India) P Rajawat | 9 | 13
(Chinese Taipei) Chou T-c | 21 | 0
(China) Weng HY | 16 | 0^{r}

Second round
3 | (Indonesia) J Christie | 21 | 21
(Hong Kong) Lee C Y | 14 | 16
8 | (Malaysia) Lee Z J | 21 | 21
(Chinese Taipei) Chou T-c | 15 | 17

Quarter-finals
3 | (Indonesia) J Christie | 21 | 21
8 | (Malaysia) Lee Z J | 11 | 6

=== Bottom half ===
==== Section 3 ====
First round
B1 | (Macau) Pui P F | 10 | 10
(Chinese Taipei) Lin C-y | 21 | 21
(China) Lu GZ | 21 | 21 | 21
7 | (India) Prannoy H. S. | 17 | 23 | 23
(Kazakhstan) D Panarin | 15 | 14
(South Korea) Jeon H-j | 21 | 21
(Hong Kong) Ng K L | 17 | 14
4 | (Japan) K Naraoka | 21 | 21

Second round
(Chinese Taipei) Lin C-y | 21 | 21
7 | (India) Prannoy H. S. | 18 | 11
(South Korea) Jeon H-j | 14 | 12
4 | (Japan) K Naraoka | 21 | 21

Quarter-finals
(Chinese Taipei) Lin C-y | 18 | 19
4 | (Japan) K Naraoka | 21 | 21

==== Section 4 ====
First round
(Malaysia) Ng T Y
(Chinese Taipei) Wang T-w | w | / | o
C1 | (Saudi Arabia) M Shaikh | 11 | 12
5 | (China) Li SF | 21 | 21
(United Arab Emirates) S Romdhani | 21 | 0
(Japan) K Tsuneyama | 18 | 0^{r}
(India) S Kidambi | 14 | 13
2 | (Indonesia) A S Ginting | 21 | 21

Second round
(Chinese Taipei) Wang T-w | 10 | 12
5 | (China) Li SF | 21 | 21
(United Arab Emirates) S Romdhani | 9 | 10
2 | (Indonesia) A S Ginting | 21 | 21

Quarter-finals
5 | (China) Li SF | 21 | 21
2 | (Indonesia) A S Ginting | 9 | 10

== Women's singles ==
=== Seeds ===
1. (South Korea) An Se-young (quarter-finals)
2. (China) Chen Yufei (final)
3. (Chinese Taipei) Tai Tzu-ying (second round)
4. (Japan) Akane Yamaguchi (quarter-finals)
5. (China) He Bingjiao (semi-finals)
6. (China) Han Yue (semi-finals)
7. (Indonesia) Gregoria Mariska Tunjung (quarter-finals)
8. (China) Wang Zhiyi (champion)

=== Finals ===
Semi-finals
5 | (China) He Bingjiao | 19 | 17
8 | (China) Wang Zhiyi | 21 | 21
6 | (China) Han Yue | 15 | 16
2 | (China) Chen Yufei | 21 | 21

Final
8 | (China) Wang Zhiyi | 21 | 21
2 | (China) Chen Yufei | 19 | 7

=== Top half ===
==== Section 1 ====
First round
1 | (South Korea) An S-y | 21 | 18 | 21
(Japan) N Okuhara | 15 | 21 | 17
(Thailand) B Ongbamrungphan | 21 | 21
(India) A Kashyap | 10 | 11
5 | (China) He BJ | 21 | 21
C1 | (Sri Lanka) R Liyanage | 13 | 9
(Indonesia) P K Wardani | 12 | 12
(Chinese Taipei) Sung S-y | 21 | 21

Second round
1 | (South Korea) An S-y | 21 | 21
(Thailand) B Ongbamrungphan | 18 | 9
5 | (China) He BJ | 21 | 20 | 21
(Chinese Taipei) Sung S-y | 8 | 22 | 16

Quarter-finals
1 | (South Korea) An S-y | 17 | 18
5 | (China) He BJ | 21 | 21

==== Section 2 ====
First round
3 | (Chinese Taipei) Tai T-y | 21 | 21
A1 | (Hong Kong) Lo S Y | 10 | 16
(Vietnam) Nguyễn T L | 14 | 5
(Japan) A Ohori | 21 | 21
8 | (China) Wang ZY | 21 | 21
(Indonesia) E N T Wardoyo | 9 | 10
(Thailand) P Chochuwong
(Singapore) Yeo J M | w | / | o

Second round
3 | (Chinese Taipei) Tai T-y | 20 | 14
(Japan) A Ohori | 22 | 21
8 | (China) Wang ZY | 21 | 21
(Singapore) Yeo J M | 13 | 14

Quarter-finals
(Japan) A Ohori | 21 | 12 | 11
8 | (China) Wang ZY | 15 | 21 | 21

=== Bottom half ===
==== Section 3 ====
First round
(Malaysia) Goh J W | 21 | 14 | 19
(India) P. V. Sindhu | 18 | 21 | 21
(Chinese Taipei) Hsu W-c | 14 | 14
6 | (China) Han Y | 21 | 21
(South Korea) Kim G-e | 21 | 21
(Thailand) R Intanon | 16 | 14
D1 | (Macau) Pui C W | 7 | 12
4 | (Japan) A Yamaguchi | 21 | 21

Second round
(India) P. V. Sindhu | 18 | 21 | 17
6 | (China) Han Y | 21 | 13 | 21
(South Korea) Kim G-e | 14 | 0^{r}
4 | (Japan) A Yamaguchi | 21 | 0

Quarter-finals
6 | (China) Han Y | 21 | 21
4 | (Japan) A Yamaguchi | 13 | 16

==== Section 4 ====
First round
(Myanmar) Thet Htar T | 12 | 14
(Chinese Taipei) Pai Y-p | 21 | 21
(Japan) N Nidaira | 9 | 14
7 | (Indonesia) G M Tunjung | 21 | 21
B1 | (India) M Bansod | 18 | 19
(South Korea) Sim Y-j | 21 | 21
(Thailand) S Katethong | 14 | 16
2 | (China) Chen YF | 21 | 21

Second round
(Chinese Taipei) Pai Y-p | 19 | 16
7 | (Indonesia) G M Tunjung | 21 | 21
(South Korea) Sim Y-j | 9 | 12
2 | (China) Chen YF | 21 | 21

Quarter-finals
7 | (Indonesia) G M Tunjung | 16 | 19
2 | (China) Chen YF | 21 | 21

== Men's doubles ==
=== Seeds ===
1. (India) Satwiksairaj Rankireddy / Chirag Shetty (withdrew)
2. (South Korea) Kang Min-hyuk / Seo Seung-jae (first round)
3. (China) Liang Weikeng / Wang Chang (champions)
4. (Malaysia) Aaron Chia / Soh Wooi Yik (semi-finals)
5. (Japan) Takuro Hoki / Yugo Kobayashi (quarter-finals)
6. (Indonesia) Fajar Alfian / Muhammad Rian Ardianto (quarter-finals)
7. (China) Liu Yuchen / Ou Xuanyi (quarter-finals)
8. (Indonesia) Muhammad Shohibul Fikri / Bagas Maulana (first round)

=== Finals ===
Semi-finals
(Chinese Taipei) Lee Jhe-huei (Chinese Taipei) Yang Po-hsuan | 17 | 17
3 | (China) Liang Weikeng (China) Wang Chang | 21 | 21
4 | (Malaysia) Aaron Chia (Malaysia) Soh Wooi Yik | 14 | 18
(Malaysia) Goh Sze Fei (Malaysia) Nur Izzuddin | 21 | 21

Final
3 | (China) Liang Weikeng (China) Wang Chang | 21 | 15 | 21
(Malaysia) Goh Sze Fei (Malaysia) Nur Izzuddin | 17 | 21 | 10

=== Top half ===
==== Section 1 ====
First round
1 | (India) S Rankireddy (India) C Shetty
(Chinese Taipei) Lee J-h (Chinese Taipei) Yang P-hs | w | / | o
(Malaysia) Man W C (Malaysia) Tee K W | 21 | 21
(China) Chen BY (China) Liu Y | 15 | 12
5 | (Japan) T Hoki (Japan) Y Kobayashi | 21 | 21
C1 | (United Arab Emirates) De Ayyappan (United Arab Emirates) Dh Ayyappan | 8 | 4
(South Korea) Jin Y (South Korea) Na S-s | 21 | 21
(Thailand) P Sukphun (Thailand) P Teeraratsakul | 19 | 13

Second round
(Chinese Taipei) Lee J-h (Chinese Taipei) Yang P-hs | 21 | 21
(Malaysia) Man W C (Malaysia) Tee K W | 18 | 17
5 | (Japan) T Hoki (Japan) Y Kobayashi | 21 | 22
(South Korea) Jin Y (South Korea) Na S-s | 5 | 20

Quarter-finals
(Chinese Taipei) Lee J-h (Chinese Taipei) Yang P-hs | 14 | 21 | 21
5 | (Japan) T Hoki (Japan) Y Kobayashi | 21 | 18 | 17

==== Section 2 ====
First round
3 | (China) Liang WK (China) Wang C | 21 | 21
(India) K P Garaga (India) Sai P K | 14 | 17
(Malaysia) Ong Y S (Malaysia) Teo E Y | 19 | 21 | 19
(Japan) A Endo (Japan) Y Takei | 21 | 15 | 21
6 | (Indonesia) F Alfian (Indonesia) M R Ardianto | 21 | 21
(Thailand) P Kaosamaang (Thailand) W Thongsa-nga | 16 | 16
(Chinese Taipei) Lu C-y (Chinese Taipei) Yang P-ha | 21 | 21
D1 | (Vietnam) Nguyễn Đ H (Vietnam) Trần Đ M | 11 | 8

Second round
3 | (China) Liang WK (China) Wang C | 21 | 21
(Japan) A Endo (Japan) Y Takei | 14 | 15
6 | (Indonesia) F Alfian (Indonesia) M R Ardianto | 21 | 21
(Chinese Taipei) Lu C-y (Chinese Taipei) Yang P-ha | 17 | 16

Quarter-finals
3 | (China) Liang WK (China) Wang C | 21 | 12 | 21
6 | (Indonesia) F Alfian (Indonesia) M R Ardianto | 19 | 21 | 17

=== Bottom half ===
==== Section 3 ====
First round
(South Korea) Kim Y-h (South Korea) Wang C | 13 | 21 | 23
(Indonesia) L R Carnando (Indonesia) D Marthin | 21 | 19 | 21
(India) Arjun M. R. (India) D Kapila | 21 | 21 | 24
7 | (China) Liu YC (China) Ou XY | 23 | 19 | 26
(Japan) K Mitsuhashi (Japan) H Okamura | 21 | 12 | 21
(Chinese Taipei) Lee F-c (Chinese Taipei) Lee F-j | 16 | 21 | 11
A1 | (India) H Amsakarunan (India) R K Rethinasabapathi | 15 | 14
4 | (Malaysia) A Chia (Malaysia) Soh W Y | 21 | 21

Second round
(South Korea) Kim Y-h (South Korea) Wang C | 16 | 20
7 | (China) Liu YC (China) Ou XY | 21 | 22
(Japan) K Mitsuhashi (Japan) H Okamura | 18 | 21 | 14
4 | (Malaysia) A Chia (Malaysia) Soh W Y | 21 | 14 | 21

Quarter-finals
7 | (China) Liu YC (China) Ou XY | 14 | 15
4 | (Malaysia) A Chia (Malaysia) Soh W Y | 21 | 21

==== Section 4 ====
First round
(Chinese Taipei) Lee Y (Chinese Taipei) Wang C-l | 21 | 22
(Japan) A Koga (Japan) T Saito | 17 | 20
(Thailand) S Jomkoh (Thailand) K Kedren | 15 | 21 | 21
8 | (Indonesia) M S Fikri (Indonesia) B Maulana | 21 | 16 | 17
B1 | (Thailand) P Thongkham (Thailand) W Thongkham | 14 | 13
(China) He JT (China) Ren XY | 21 | 21
(Malaysia) Goh S F (Malaysia) N Izzuddin | 21 | 21
2 | (South Korea) Kang M-h (South Korea) Seo S-j | 13 | 18

Second round
(Chinese Taipei) Lee Y (Chinese Taipei) Wang C-l | 21 | 21
(Thailand) S Jomkoh (Thailand) K Kedren | 11 | 14
(China) He JT (China) Ren XY | 11 | 0^{r}
(Malaysia) Goh S F (Malaysia) N Izzuddin | 21 | 0

Quarter-finals
(Chinese Taipei) Lee Y (Chinese Taipei) Wang C-l | 21 | 19 | 19
(Malaysia) Goh S F (Malaysia) N Izzuddin | 19 | 21 | 21

== Women's doubles ==
=== Seeds ===
1. (China) Chen Qingchen / Jia Yifan (semi-finals)
2. (South Korea) Baek Ha-na / Lee So-hee (champions)
3. (Japan) Nami Matsuyama / Chiharu Shida (quarter-finals)
4. (China) Liu Shengshu / Tan Ning (semi-finals)
5. (South Korea) Kim So-yeong / Kong Hee-yong (second round)
6. (Japan) Yuki Fukushima / Sayaka Hirota (first round)
7. (China) Zhang Shuxian / Zheng Yu (final)
8. (Japan) Mayu Matsumoto / Wakana Nagahara (quarter-finals)

=== Finals ===
Semi-finals
1 | (China) Chen Qingchen (China) Jia Yifan | 14 | 16
7 | (China) Zhang Shuxian (China) Zheng Yu | 21 | 21
4 | (China) Liu Shengshu (China) Tan Ning | 21 | 18 | 12
2 | (South Korea) Baek Ha-na (South Korea) Lee So-hee | 12 | 21 | 21

Final
7 | (China) Zhang Shuxian (China) Zheng Yu | 21 | 12
2 | (South Korea) Baek Ha-na (South Korea) Lee So-hee | 23 | 21

=== Top half ===
==== Section 1 ====
First round
1 | (China) Chen QC (China) Jia YF | 21 | 21
(Indonesia) L T Mayasari (Indonesia) R Sugiarto | 15 | 14
(Chinese Taipei) Hsu Y-c (Chinese Taipei) Lin W-c | 13 | 20
(Thailand) L Kanlaha (Thailand) P Muenwong | 21 | 22
5 | (South Korea) Kim S-y (South Korea) Kong H-y | 21 | 21
D1 | (Hong Kong) Fan K Y (Hong Kong) Yau M Y | 16 | 9
(Japan) R Miyaura (Japan) A Sakuramoto | w | / | o
(Hong Kong) Lui L L (Hong Kong) Ng W Y

Second round
1 | (China) Chen QC (China) Jia YF | 21 | 21
(Thailand) L Kanlaha (Thailand) P Muenwong | 9 | 16
5 | (South Korea) Kim S-y (South Korea) Kong H-y | 21 | 15 | 21
(Japan) R Miyaura (Japan) A Sakuramoto | 15 | 21 | 23

Quarter-finals
1 | (China) Chen QC (China) Jia YF | 21 | 18 | 21
(Japan) R Miyaura (Japan) A Sakuramoto | 10 | 21 | 19

==== Section 2 ====
First round
3 | (Japan) N Matsuyama (Japan) C Shida | 17 | 21 | 21
(Thailand) J Kititharakul (Thailand) R Prajongjai | 21 | 18 | 16
(India) T Crasto (India) A Ponnappa | w | / | o
(Indonesia) F D Kusuma (Indonesia) A C Pratiwi
7 | (China) Zhang SX (China) Zheng Y | 21 | 21
A1 | (India) R Panda (India) S Panda | 8 | 13
(South Korea) Jeong N-e (South Korea) Kim H-j | 21 | 21
(Malaysia) V Hoo (Malaysia) Lim C S | 11 | 10

Second round
3 | (Japan) N Matsuyama (Japan) C Shida | 21 | 21
(India) T Crasto (India) A Ponnappa | 17 | 12
7 | (China) Zhang SX (China) Zheng Y | 21 | 14 | 21
(South Korea) Jeong N-e (South Korea) Kim H-j | 17 | 21 | 18

Quarter-finals
3 | (Japan) N Matsuyama (Japan) C Shida | 7 | 16
7 | (China) Zhang SX (China) Zheng Y | 21 | 21

=== Bottom half ===
==== Section 3 ====
First round
(Hong Kong) Yeung N T (Hong Kong) Yeung P L | 18 | 21 | 21
(Indonesia) M T Puspita Sari (Indonesia) R A Rose | 21 | 14 | 19
(South Korea) Lee Y-l (South Korea) Shin S-c | 22 | 21
6 | (Japan) Y Fukushima (Japan) S Hirota | 20 | 18
(Chinese Taipei) Lee C-h (Chinese Taipei) Teng C-h | 12 | 21 | 12
B1 | (Chinese Taipei) Hu L-f (Chinese Taipei) Lin X-m | 21 | 15 | 21
(India) T Jolly (India) G Gopichand | 2 | 11
4 | (China) Liu SS (China) Tan N | 21 | 21

Second round
(Hong Kong) Yeung N T (Hong Kong) Yeung P L | 16 | 17
(South Korea) Lee Y-l (South Korea) Shin S-c | 21 | 21
B1 | (Chinese Taipei) Hu L-f (Chinese Taipei) Lin X-m | 13 | 16
4 | (China) Liu SS (China) Tan N | 21 | 21

Quarter-finals
(South Korea) Lee Y-l (South Korea) Shin S-c | 17 | 11
4 | (China) Liu SS (China) Tan N | 21 | 21

==== Section 4 ====
First round
(China) Li WM (China) Liu XX
(Chinese Taipei) Chang C-h (Chinese Taipei) Yang C-t | w | / | o
(Malaysia) P Tan (Malaysia) Thinaah M | 21 | 13 | 16
8 | (Japan) M Matsumoto (Japan) W Nagahara | 19 | 21 | 21
(Indonesia) A Rahayu (Indonesia) S F S Ramadhanti | n | / | m
(Thailand) B Aimsaard (Thailand) N Aimsaard | n | / | m
C1 | (India) S Singhi (India) R Thaker | 5 | 7
2 | (South Korea) Baek H-n (South Korea) Lee S-h | 21 | 21

Second round
(Chinese Taipei) Chang C-h (Chinese Taipei) Yang C-t | 16 | 6
8 | (Japan) M Matsumoto (Japan) W Nagahara | 21 | 21
2 | (South Korea) Baek H-n (South Korea) Lee S-h | w | / | o

Quarter-finals
8 | (Japan) M Matsumoto (Japan) W Nagahara | 8 | 17
2 | (South Korea) Baek H-n (South Korea) Lee S-h | 21 | 21

== Mixed doubles ==
=== Seeds ===
1. (China) Zheng Siwei / Huang Yaqiong (semi-finals)
2. (Japan) Yuta Watanabe / Arisa Higashino (quarter-finals)
3. (China) Feng Yanzhe / Huang Dongping (champions)
4. (South Korea) Seo Seung-jae / Chae Yoo-jung (final)
5. (China) Jiang Zhenbang / Wei Yaxin (semi-finals)
6. (Thailand) Dechapol Puavaranukroh / Sapsiree Taerattanachai (quarter-finals)
7. (South Korea) Kim Won-ho / Jeong Na-eun (quarter-finals)
8. (Hong Kong) Tang Chun Man / Tse Ying Suet (quarter-finals)

=== Finals ===
Semi-finals
1 | (China) Zheng Siwei (China) Huang Yaqiong | 21 | 13 | 16
4 | (South Korea) Seo Seung-jae (South Korea) Chae Yoo-jung | 9 | 21 | 21
3 | (China) Feng Yanzhe (China) Huang Dongping | 21 | 21
5 | (China) Jiang Zhenbang (China) Wei Yaxin | 10 | 14

Final
4 | (South Korea) Seo Seung-jae (South Korea) Chae Yoo-jung | 21 | 15 | 14
3 | (China) Feng Yanzhe (China) Huang Dongping | 13 | 21 | 21

=== Top half ===
==== Section 1 ====
First round
1 | (China) Zheng SW (China) Huang YQ | 21 | 21
(Malaysia) Chen T J (Malaysia) Toh E W | 15 | 15
(Chinese Taipei) Chang K-c (Chinese Taipei) Lee C-c | 19 | 9
(Singapore) T Hee (Singapore) J Tan | 21 | 21
8 | (Hong Kong) Tang C M (Hong Kong) Tse Y S | 21 | 21
B1 | (United Arab Emirates) Kuswanto (United Arab Emirates) S Sreejith Parol | 13 | 7
(Indonesia) A Maulana (Indonesia) N V Marwah | 8 | 12
(Japan) Y Kaneko (Japan) M Matsutomo | 21 | 21

Second round
1 | (China) Zheng SW (China) Huang YQ | 21 | 21
(Singapore) T Hee (Singapore) J Tan | 11 | 11
8 | (Hong Kong) Tang C M (Hong Kong) Tse Y S | 19 | 21 | 21
(Japan) Y Kaneko (Japan) M Matsutomo | 21 | 11 | 18

Quarter-finals
1 | (China) Zheng SW (China) Huang YQ | 21 | 22
8 | (Hong Kong) Tang C M (Hong Kong) Tse Y S | 11 | 20

==== Section 2 ====
First round
4 | (South Korea) Seo S-j (South Korea) Chae Y-j | 21 | 21
(Chinese Taipei) Ye H-w (Chinese Taipei) Lee C-h | 15 | 13
(Indonesia) R Rivaldy (Indonesia) P H Mentari | 21 | 14 | 21
(Japan) H Midorikawa (Japan) N Saito | 13 | 21 | 18
6 | (Thailand) D Puavaranukroh (Thailand) S Taerattanachai | 21 | 21
(Malaysia) Yap R K (Malaysia) V Siow | 8 | 15
(China) Cheng X (China) Chen FH | 21 | 21
C1 | (Vietnam) Phạm V H (Vietnam) Thân V A | 10 | 14

Second round
4 | (South Korea) Seo S-j (South Korea) Chae Y-j | 21 | 21
(Indonesia) R Rivaldy (Indonesia) P H Mentari | 18 | 14
6 | (Thailand) D Puavaranukroh (Thailand) S Taerattanachai | 21 | 7 | 21
(China) Cheng X (China) Chen FH | 16 | 21 | 18

Quarter-finals
4 | (South Korea) Seo S-j (South Korea) Chae Y-j | 17 | 21 | 21
6 | (Thailand) D Puavaranukroh (Thailand) S Taerattanachai | 21 | 11 | 13

=== Bottom half ===
==== Section 3 ====
First round
(Malaysia) Tan K M (Malaysia) Lai P J | 19 | 11
(Indonesia) D Ferdinansyah (Indonesia) G E Widjaja | 21 | 21
(Japan) K Yamashita (Japan) N Shinoya | 16 | 14
7 | (South Korea) Kim W-h (South Korea) Jeong N-e | 21 | 21
D1 | (Thailand) P Teeraratsakul (Thailand) P Muenwong | 15 | 21 | 17
(Thailand) S Jomkoh (Thailand) S Paewsampran | 21 | 12 | 21
(Chinese Taipei) Chiu H-c (Chinese Taipei) Lin X-m | 10 | 12
3 | (China) Feng YZ (China) Huang DP | 21 | 21

Second round
(Indonesia) D Ferdinansyah (Indonesia) G E Widjaja | 18 | 16
7 | (South Korea) Kim W-h (South Korea) Jeong N-e | 21 | 21
(Thailand) S Jomkoh (Thailand) S Paewsampran | 8 | 16
3 | (China) Feng YZ (China) Huang DP | 21 | 21

Quarter-finals
7 | (South Korea) Kim W-h (South Korea) Jeong N-e | 6 | 17
3 | (China) Feng YZ (China) Huang DP | 21 | 21

==== Section 4 ====
First round
A1 | (India) S Karunakaran (India) A Variyath | 12 | 13
(Hong Kong) Lee C H (Hong Kong) Ng T Y | 21 | 21
(Malaysia) Goh S H (Malaysia) S J Lai | 15 | 14
5 | (China) Jiang ZB (China) Wei YX | 21 | 21
(Thailand) R Oupthong (Thailand) J Sudjaipraparat | 14 | 14
(Chinese Taipei) Yang P-h (Chinese Taipei) Hu L-f | 21 | 21
(Indonesia) R N Kusharjanto (Indonesia) L A Kusumawati | 16 | 13
2 | (Japan) Y Watanabe (Japan) A Higashino | 21 | 21

Second round
(Hong Kong) Lee C H (Hong Kong) Ng T Y | 13 | 9
5 | (China) Jiang ZB (China) Wei YX | 21 | 21
(Chinese Taipei) Yang P-h (Chinese Taipei) Hu L-f | 13 | 10
2 | (Japan) Y Watanabe (Japan) A Higashino | 21 | 21

Quarter-finals
5 | (China) Jiang ZB (China) Wei YX | 21 | 21
2 | (Japan) Y Watanabe (Japan) A Higashino | 17 | 13
