= 2017 Macau Open Grand Prix Gold =

Tournament details
- Dates: 7 – 12 November 2017
- Level: Grand Prix Gold
- Total prize money: US$120,000
- Venue: Tap Seac Multisport Pavilion Macau
- Location: Macau

Champions
- Men's singles: (Japan) Kento Momota
- Women's singles: (China) Cai Yanyan
- Men's doubles: (Indonesia) Wahyu Nayaka (Indonesia) Ade Yusuf
- Women's doubles: (China) Huang Yaqiong (China) Yu Xiaohan
- Mixed doubles: (China) Zheng Siwei (China) Huang Yaqiong

The 2017 Macau Open was a badminton tournament which took place at Tap Seac Multisport Pavilion Macau in Macau from 7 to 12 November 2017 and had a total purse of $120,000.

== Tournament ==
The 2017 Macau Open Grand Prix Gold was the sixteenth Grand Prix badminton tournament of the 2017 BWF Grand Prix Gold and Grand Prix and also part of the Macau Open championships which has been held since 2006. This tournament was organized by the Badminton Federation of Macau and sanctioned by the BWF.

=== Venue ===
This international tournament was held at Tap Seac Multisport Pavilion Macau in Macau.

=== Point distribution ===
Below is the tables with the point distribution for each phase of the tournament based on the BWF points system for the Grand Prix Gold event.

| Winner | Runner-up | 3/4 | 5/8 | 9/16 | 17/32 | 33/64 | 65/128 | 129/256 | 257/512 | 513/1024 |
|---|---|---|---|---|---|---|---|---|---|---|
| 7,000 | 5,950 | 4,900 | 3,850 | 2,750 | 1,670 | 660 | 320 | 130 | 60 | 30 |

=== Prize money ===
The total prize money for this year tournament is US$120,000. Distribution of prize money will be in accordance with BWF regulations.

| Event | Winner | Finals | Semifinals | Quarterfinals | Last 16 |
| Singles | $9,000 | $4,560 | $1,740 | $720 | $420 |
| Doubles | $9,480 | $4,560 | $1,680 | $870 | $450 |

== Men's singles ==
=== Seeds ===
1. (Hong Kong) Ng Ka Long Angus (withdrew)
2. (Hong Kong) Wong Wing Ki (quarterfinals)
3. (South Korea) Lee Hyun-il (semifinals)
4. (Hong Kong) Hu Yun (first round)
5. (Chinese Taipei) Hsu Jen-hao (first round)
6. (Japan) Kanta Tsuneyama (quarterfinals)
7. (Malaysia) Chong Wei Feng (quarterfinals)
8. (China) Zhao Junpeng (third round)
9. (Chinese Taipei) Lin Yu-hsien (second round)
10. (Malaysia) Zulfadli Zulkiffli (semifinals)
11. (Malaysia) Liew Daren (second round)
12. (Hong Kong) Wei Nan (first round)
13. (Hong Kong) Lee Cheuk Yiu (second round)
14. (Indonesia) Ihsan Maulana Mustofa (final)
15. (Thailand) Pannawit Thongnuam (third round)
16. (Chinese Taipei) Hsueh Hsuan-yi (first round)

=== Finals ===
Quarterfinals
(Japan) Kento Momota | 21 | 21
6 | (Japan) Kanta Tsuneyama | 9 | 15
3 | (South Korea) Lee Hyun-il | 21 | 21 | 21
7 | (Malaysia) Chong Wei Feng | 23 | 10 | 11
(Chinese Taipei) Shih Kuei-chun | 21 | 18 | 6
10 | (Malaysia) Zulfadli Zulkiffli | 15 | 21 | 21
14 | (Indonesia) Ihsan Maulana Mustofa | 12 | 21 | 21
2 | (Hong Kong) Wong Wing Ki | 21 | 17 | 16

Semifinals
(Japan) Kento Momota | 21 | 21
3 | (South Korea) Lee Hyun-il | 8 | 10
10 | (Malaysia) Zulfadli Zulkiffli
14 | (Indonesia) Ihsan Maulana Mustofa | w | / | o

Final
(Japan) Kento Momota | 21 | 21
14 | (Indonesia) Ihsan Maulana Mustofa | 16 | 10

=== Top half ===
==== Section 1 ====
First round
PFQ | (Malaysia) A Lau | 21 | 18 | 21
PFQ | (England) K Tang | 18 | 21 | 15
(Japan) N Yamazawa | 21 | 21
(Indonesia) N E Sulistyo | 9 | 7
13 | (Hong Kong) Lee C Y | 21 | 24 | 21
(Japan) R Takeshita | 15 | 26 | 16
(Indonesia) K A Nugraha | 9 | 21 | 15
(Japan) K Momota | 21 | 14 | 21

Second round
PFQ | (Malaysia) A Lau | 21 | 12 | 9^{r}
(Japan) N Yamazawa | 12 | 21 | 17
13 | (Hong Kong) Lee C Y | 17 | 21 | 15
(Japan) K Momota | 21 | 15 | 21

Third round
(Japan) N Yamazawa | 17 | 7
(Japan) K Momota | 21 | 21

==== Section 2 ====
First round
6 | (Japan) K Tsuneyama | 21 | 21
(Russia) S Sirant | 10 | 12
Q3 | (Indonesia) R Perdana | 7 | 16
(China) Sun FX | 21 | 21
15 | (Thailand) P Thongnuam | 21 | 21
PFQ | (Macau) Pui P F | 6 | 12
(Chinese Taipei) Lin C-h | 21 | 21
(Vietnam) Nguyen H N | 16 | 14

Second round
6 | (Japan) K Tsuneyama | 21 | 21
(China) Sun FX | 7 | 14
15 | (Thailand) P Thongnuam | 21 | 21
(Chinese Taipei) Lin C-h | 11 | 11

Third round
6 | (Japan) K Tsuneyama | 21 | 21
15 | (Thailand) P Thongnuam | 14 | 10

==== Section 3 ====
First round
3 | (South Korea) Lee H-i | 21 | 21
(Malaysia) Cheam J W | 13 | 16
(Hong Kong) Chan Y C | 18 | 21 | 11
(Chinese Taipei) Lee C-h | 21 | 12 | 21
9 | (Chinese Taipei) Lin Y-h | 22 | 13 | 21
(China) Zhou ZQ | 20 | 21 | 19
(Indonesia) F A Kholik | 21 | 21
Q4 | (Malaysia) E S Misfahul Muneer | 10 | 9

Second round
3 | (South Korea) Lee H-i | 21 | 21
(Chinese Taipei) Lee C-h | 13 | 9
9 | (Chinese Taipei) Lin Y-h | 21 | 16 | 12
(Indonesia) F A Kholik | 17 | 21 | 21

Third round
3 | (South Korea) Lee H-i | 21 | 17 | 21
(Indonesia) F A Kholik | 16 | 21 | 6

==== Section 4 ====
First round
7 | (Malaysia) Chong W F | 21 | 21
(United States) H L Lee | 12 | 14
Q5 | (Malaysia) Yeoh S Z | 21 | 9 | 19
(Indonesia) P A Maulana | 15 | 21 | 21
11 | (Malaysia) D Liew | 21 | 21
(Thailand) M Narongrit | 19 | 11
(Japan) K Watanabe | 24 | 21
Q7 | (Chinese Taipei) Hung C-c | 22 | 9

Second round
7 | (Malaysia) Chong W F | 21 | 21
(Indonesia) P A Maulana | 18 | 14
11 | (Malaysia) D Liew | 14 | 19
(Japan) K Watanabe | 21 | 21

Third round
7 | (Malaysia) Chong W F | 21 | 21
(Japan) K Watanabe | 17 | 15

=== Bottom half ===
==== Section 5 ====
First round
(Chinese Taipei) Shih K-c | 21 | 21
(Malaysia) S Ramachandran | 11 | 14
(Thailand) K Wangcharoen | 21 | 21
16 | (Chinese Taipei) Hsueh H-y | 12 | 12
(Chinese Taipei) Chen C-w | 21 | 14 | 15
(Thailand) A Namkul | 18 | 21 | 21
(Thailand) T Sitthikom | 14
5 | (Chinese Taipei) Hsu J-h | 6^{r}

Second round
(Chinese Taipei) Shih K-c | 16 | 21 | 21
(Thailand) K Wangcharoen | 21 | 19 | 19
(Thailand) A Namkul | 19 | 8
(Thailand) T Sitthikom | 21 | 21

Third round
(Chinese Taipei) Shih K-c | 21 | 16 | 21
(Thailand) T Sitthikom | 15 | 21 | 17

==== Section 6 ====
First round
(England) H S Wong | 21 | 11 | 21
Q1 | (Macau) Ao F L | 15 | 21 | 10
Q2 | (Malaysia) V Phuah | 15 | 15
10 | (Malaysia) Z Zulkiffli | 21 | 21
(South Korea) Woo S-h | 14 | 14
(Malaysia) Lim C W | 21 | 21
(Japan) H Shimono | 21 | 11
4 | (Hong Kong) Hu Y | 12 | 3^{r}

Second round
(England) H S Wong | 7 | 9
10 | (Malaysia) Z Zulkiffli | 21 | 21
(Malaysia) Lim C W | 21 | 14 | 21
(Japan) H Shimono | 16 | 21 | 11

Third round
10 | (Malaysia) Z Zulkiffli | 21 | 14 | 21
(Malaysia) Lim C W | 11 | 21 | 15

==== Section 7 ====
First round
(Chinese Taipei) Lu C-h | 21 | 21
(Indonesia) K H Wibowo | 13 | 18
(Japan) Y Igarashi | 5 | 10
14 | (Indonesia) I M Mustofa | 21 | 21
Q6 | (Chinese Taipei) Lai Y-h | 12 | 10
(Indonesia) D H Rumbaka | 21 | 21
(Malaysia) Soong J V | 19 | 13
8 | (China) Zhao JP | 21 | 21

Second round
(Chinese Taipei) Lu C-h | 12 | 14
14 | (Indonesia) I M Mustofa | 21 | 21
(Indonesia) D H Rumbaka | 17 | 19
8 | (China) Zhao JP | 21 | 21

Third round
14 | (Indonesia) I M Mustofa | 21 | 15 | 21
8 | (China) Zhao JP | 17 | 21 | 8

==== Section 8 ====
First round
(Chinese Taipei) Kan C-y | 8 | 5
(China) Guo K | 21 | 21
(China) Ren PB | 16 | 21 | 21
12 | (Hong Kong) Wei N | 21 | 17 | 16
(Japan) K Naraoka | 21 | 21
Q8 | (Portugal) R Mendes | 6 | 8
(Indonesia) S H Rhustavito | 18 | 21 | 19
2 | (Hong Kong) Wong W K | 21 | 17 | 21

Second round
(China) Guo K | 21 | 9 | 10
(China) Ren PB | 9 | 21 | 21
(Japan) K Naraoka | 18 | 16
2 | (Hong Kong) Wong W K | 21 | 21

Third round
(China) Ren PB | 12 | 21 | 13
2 | (Hong Kong) Wong W K | 21 | 16 | 21

== Women's singles ==
=== Seeds ===
1. (Japan) Aya Ohori (quarterfinals)
2. (Hong Kong) Cheung Ngan Yi (semifinals)
3. (Japan) Saena Kawakami (first round)
4. (Indonesia) Fitriani (second round)
5. (Hong Kong) Yip Pui Yin (first round)
6. (Russia) Evgeniya Kosetskaya (second round)
7. (Japan) Haruko Suzuki (second round)
8. (Chinese Taipei) Chen Su-yu (quarterfinals)

=== Finals ===
Semifinals
(China) Zhang Yiman | 22 | 16 | 11
(Chinese Taipei) Pai Yu-po | 20 | 21 | 21
(China) Cai Yanyan | 21 | 21
2 | (Hong Kong) Cheung Ngan Yi | 16 | 13

Final
(Chinese Taipei) Pai Yu-po | 15 | 21 | 16
(China) Cai Yanyan | 21 | 17 | 21

=== Top half ===
==== Section 1 ====
First round
1 | (Japan) A Ohori | 21 | 21
(Israel) K Polikarpova | 11 | 11
(Indonesia) J Muljati | 19 | 8
(Chinese Taipei) Sung S-y | 21 | 21
5 | (Hong Kong) Yip P Y | 14 | 19
(China) Zhang YM | 21 | 21
(China) Gao FJ | 21 | 21
(Japan) S Saito | 10 | 14

Second round
1 | (Japan) A Ohori | 21 | 21
(Chinese Taipei) Sung S-y | 14 | 12
(China) Zhang YM | 21 | 18 | 21
(China) Gao FJ | 16 | 21 | 14

Quarterfinals
1 | (Japan) A Ohori | 21 | 21 | 19
(China) Zhang YM | 23 | 16 | 21

==== Section 2 ====
First round
4 | (Indonesia) Fitriani | 21 | 18 | 21
(Japan) A Mine | 12 | 21 | 19
(China) Han Y | 21 | 21
(Australia) Chen H-y | 4 | 18
6 | (Russia) E Kosetskaya | 21 | 21
Q2 | (Hong Kong) Fan K Y | 13 | 11
(Chinese Taipei) Pai Y-p | 21 | 21
(Indonesia) R Hartawan | 15 | 15

Second round
4 | (Indonesia) Fitriani | 19 | 21 | 14
(China) Han Y | 21 | 16 | 21
6 | (Russia) E Kosetskaya | 21 | 8 | 12
(Chinese Taipei) Pai Y-p | 13 | 21 | 21

Quarterfinals
(China) Han Y | 19 | 19
(Chinese Taipei) Pai Y-p | 21 | 21

=== Bottom half ===
==== Section 3 ====
First round
(China) Cai YY | 21 | 15 | 21
(Indonesia) G M Tunjung | 14 | 21 | 13
(Indonesia) Y Y Susanto | 15 | 16
7 | (Japan) H Suzuki | 21 | 21
(Indonesia) R A Riodingin | 17 | 10
(Malaysia) Ho Y M | 21 | 21
Q4 | (South Korea) Lee M-j | 12 | 21 | 21
3 | (Japan) S Kawakami | 21 | 13 | 18

Second round
(China) Cai YY | 21 | 21
7 | (Japan) H Suzuki | 18 | 18
(Malaysia) Ho Y M | 13 | 14
Q4 | (South Korea) Lee M-j | 21 | 21

Quarterfinals
(China) Cai YY | 21 | 21
Q4 | (South Korea) Lee M-j | 18 | 18

==== Section 4 ====
First round
Q3 | (South Korea) Jeon J-i | 21 | 11
(Japan) N Nidaira | 23 | 21
(Canada) B Tam | 15 | 15
8 | (Chinese Taipei) Chen S-y | 21 | 21
Q1 | (China) Li WM | 21 | 21
WC | (Macau) Ng W C | 11 | 12
(Japan) A Takahashi | 14 | 13
2 | (Hong Kong) Cheung N Y | 21 | 21

Second round
(Japan) N Nidaira | 14 | 21 | 12
8 | (Chinese Taipei) Chen S-y | 21 | 13 | 21
Q1 | (China) Li WM | 22 | 14 | 6
2 | (Hong Kong) Cheung N Y | 20 | 21 | 21

Quarterfinals
8 | (Chinese Taipei) Chen S-y | 17 | 18
2 | (Hong Kong) Cheung N Y | 21 | 21

== Men's doubles ==
=== Seeds ===
1. (Chinese Taipei) Lee Jhe-huei / Lee Yang (semifinals)
2. (Russia) Vladimir Ivanov / Ivan Sozonov (withdrew)
3. (Japan) Takuto Inoue / Yuki Kaneko (quarterfinals)
4. (Chinese Taipei) Liao Min-chun / Su Cheng-heng (quarterfinals)
5. (Hong Kong) Law Cheuk Him / Lee Chun Hei (first round)
6. (Hong Kong) Or Chin Chung / Tang Chun Man (semifinals)
7. (Malaysia) Goh Sze Fei / Nur Izzuddin (withdrew)
8. (South Korea) Chung Eui-seok / Kim Duk-young (second round)

=== Finals ===
Semifinals
1 | (Chinese Taipei) Lee Jhe-huei (Chinese Taipei) Lee Yang | 19 | 8
(South Korea) Kim Won-ho (South Korea) Seo Seung-jae | 21 | 21
(Indonesia) Wahyu Nayaka (Indonesia) Ade Yusuf | 16 | 21 | 21
6 | (Hong Kong) Or Chin Chung (Hong Kong) Tang Chun Man | 21 | 17 | 12

Final
(South Korea) Kim Won-ho (South Korea) Seo Seung-jae | 13 | 14
(Indonesia) Wahyu Nayaka (Indonesia) Ade Yusuf | 21 | 21

=== Top half ===
==== Section 1 ====
First round
1 | (Chinese Taipei) Lee J-h (Chinese Taipei) Lee Y | 21 | 21
(Vietnam) Bao M (Vietnam) Duong B D | 8 | 11
(Chinese Taipei) Lin S-k (Chinese Taipei) Tseng M-h | 17 | 21 | 17
(Malaysia) N M A Ayub (Malaysia) Ooi Z H | 21 | 14 | 14^{r}
5 | (Hong Kong) Law C H (Hong Kong) Lee C H | 18 | 16
(South Korea) Choi J-w (South Korea) Kim J-h | 21 | 21
(South Korea) Kang M-h (South Korea) Kim H-t | 17 | 18
(Japan) K Matsui (Japan) Y Takeuchi | 21 | 21

Second round
1 | (Chinese Taipei) Lee J-h (Chinese Taipei) Lee Y | 21 | 21
(Chinese Taipei) Lin S-k (Chinese Taipei) Tseng M-h | 19 | 13
(South Korea) Choi J-w (South Korea) Kim J-h | 17 | 14
(Japan) K Matsui (Japan) Y Takeuchi | 21 | 21

Quarterfinals
1 | (Chinese Taipei) Lee J-h (Chinese Taipei) Lee Y | 21 | 21
(Japan) K Matsui (Japan) Y Takeuchi | 13 | 16

==== Section 2 ====
First round
3 | (Japan) T Inoue (Japan) Y Kaneko | 21 | 21
Q1 | (Chinese Taipei) Lu C-h (Chinese Taipei) Shih K-c | 8 | 14
Q2 | (China) Ren XY (China) Wang ZK | 17 | 21 | 16
(Chinese Taipei) Chang K-c (Chinese Taipei) Lu C-p | 21 | 17 | 21
PFQ | (China) Di ZJ (China) Wang C | 12 | 21 | 18
(South Korea) Kim W-h (South Korea) Seo S-j | 21 | 18 | 21
(Indonesia) K A Haryanto (Indonesia) M R P Isfahani | 21 | 21
(Chinese Taipei) Po L-w (Chinese Taipei) Yang M-t | 17 | 18

Second round
3 | (Japan) T Inoue (Japan) Y Kaneko | 21 | 22 | 21
(Chinese Taipei) Chang K-c (Chinese Taipei) Lu C-p | 15 | 24 | 15
(South Korea) Kim W-h (South Korea) Seo S-j | 21 | 18 | 21
(Indonesia) K A Haryanto (Indonesia) M R P Isfahani | 17 | 21 | 15

Quarterfinals
3 | (Japan) T Inoue (Japan) Y Kaneko | 20 | 14
(South Korea) Kim W-h (South Korea) Seo S-j | 22 | 21

=== Bottom half ===
==== Section 3 ====
First round
(Indonesia) W Nayaka (Indonesia) A Yusuf | 16 | 23 | 21
(Japan) K Gondo (Japan) T Watanabe | 21 | 21 | 19
Q3 | (Chinese Taipei) Lee C-h (Chinese Taipei) Lin C-y | 15 | 18
8 | (South Korea) Chung E-s (South Korea) Kim D-y | 21 | 21
(Japan) M Kaneko (Japan) Y Kubota | 15 | 15
(China) Han CK (China) Zhou HD | 21 | 21
(Hong Kong) Mak H C (Hong Kong) Tam C H | 17 | 21 | 15
4 | (Chinese Taipei) Liao M-c (Chinese Taipei) Su C-h | 21 | 15 | 21

Second round
(Indonesia) W Nayaka (Indonesia) A Yusuf | 21 | 21
8 | (South Korea) Chung E-s (South Korea) Kim D-y | 17 | 17
(China) Han CK (China) Zhou HD | 9 | 16
4 | (Chinese Taipei) Liao M-c (Chinese Taipei) Su C-h | 21 | 21

Quarterfinals
(Indonesia) W Nayaka (Indonesia) A Yusuf | 21 | 21
4 | (Chinese Taipei) Liao M-c (Chinese Taipei) Su C-h | 17 | 19

==== Section 4 ====
First round
(Malaysia) M A Abdul Latif (Malaysia) M R Abdul Latif | 23 | 21
(Hong Kong) Chan T K (Hong Kong) Chang T C | 21 | 15
PFQ | (Malaysia) Chen J H (Malaysia) Yeoh S Z | 16 | 11
6 | (Hong Kong) Or C C (Hong Kong) Tang C M | 21 | 21
(Thailand) S Jomkoh (Thailand) P Kuna-Anuvit | 21 | 21
(Macau) Leong I C (Macau) Pui P F | 11 | 10
Q4 | (Thailand) C Charoenkiramorn (Thailand) M Narongrit | 19 | 21 | 16
PFQ | (Indonesia) C H Kudamassa (Indonesia) R Perdana | 21 | 18 | 21

Second round
(Malaysia) M A Abdul Latif (Malaysia) M R Abdul Latif | 8 | 9
6 | (Hong Kong) Or C C (Hong Kong) Tang C M | 21 | 21
(Thailand) S Jomkoh (Thailand) P Kuna-Anuvit | 21 | 21
PFQ | (Indonesia) C H Kudamassa (Indonesia) R Perdana | 14 | 12

Quarterfinals
6 | (Hong Kong) Or C C (Hong Kong) Tang C M | 21 | 21
(Thailand) S Jomkoh (Thailand) P Kuna-Anuvit | 15 | 18

== Women's doubles ==
=== Seeds ===
1. (Malaysia) Vivian Hoo Kah Mun / Woon Khe Wei (withdrew)
2. (Indonesia) Anggia Shitta Awanda / Ni Ketut Mahadewi Istirani (quarterfinals)
3. (Chinese Taipei) Hsu Ya-ching / Wu Ti-jung (second round)
4. (Malaysia) Lim Yin Loo / Yap Cheng Wen (second round)
5. (China) Huang Dongping / Jia Yifan (withdrew)
6. (South Korea) Kim Hye-rin / Lee So-hee (second round)
7. (South Korea) Kim So-yeong / Kong Hee-yong (semifinals)
8. (China) Huang Yaqiong / Yu Xiaohan (champion)

=== Finals ===
Semifinals
8 | (China) Huang Yaqiong (China) Yu Xiaohan | 21 | 21
(Indonesia) Della Destiara Haris (Indonesia) Tiara Rosalia Nuraidah | 18 | 15
(South Korea) Baek Ha-na (South Korea) Lee Yu-rim | 12 | 21 | 21
7 | (South Korea) Kim So-yeong (South Korea) Kong Hee-yong | 21 | 16 | 19

Final
8 | (China) Huang Yaqiong (China) Yu Xiaohan | 21 | 21
(South Korea) Baek Ha-na (South Korea) Lee Yu-lim | 10 | 17

=== Top half ===
==== Section 1 ====
First round
PFQ | (Macau) Gong X X (Macau) Ng W C | 7 | 7
Q1 | (Hong Kong) Tsang W C (Hong Kong) Wu Y T | 21 | 21
(Japan) C Hoshi (Japan) N Shinoya | 23 | 16 | 18
(China) Chen L (China) Tang JH | 21 | 21 | 21
8 | (China) Huang YQ (China) Yu XH | 21 | 21
(Indonesia) M I Tutiharta (Indonesia) V D Rumate | 8 | 6
(Indonesia) Y Barkah (Indonesia) N K Maheswari | 21 | 21
Q4 | (Indonesia) M Mawarti (Indonesia) G N Rahmadani | 12 | 10

Second round
Q1 | (Hong Kong) Tsang W C (Hong Kong) Wu Y T | 5 | 12
(China) Chen L (China) Tang JH | 21 | 21
8 | (China) Huang YQ (China) Yu XH | 21 | 21
(Indonesia) Y Barkah (Indonesia) N K Maheswari | 16 | 8

Quarterfinals
(China) Chen L (China) Tang JH | 19 | 12
8 | (China) Huang YQ (China) Yu XH | 21 | 21

==== Section 2 ====
First round
3 | (Chinese Taipei) Hsu Y-c (Chinese Taipei) Wu T-j | 21 | 21
(Hong Kong) Ng T Y (Hong Kong) Yeung N T | 14 | 19
Q2 | (Chinese Taipei) Chen H-h (Chinese Taipei) Hsieh P-s | 12 | 15
(Malaysia) Chow M K (Malaysia) Lee M Y | 21 | 21
6 | (South Korea) Kim H-r (South Korea) Lee S-h | 21 | 21
(Australia) S Mapasa (Australia) G Somerville | 12 | 14
(Indonesia) D D Haris (Indonesia) T R Nuraidah | 14 | 21 | 21
(Japan) M Aratama (Japan) A Watanabe | 21 | 9 | 17

Second round
3 | (Chinese Taipei) Hsu Y-c (Chinese Taipei) Wu T-j | 19 | 14
(Malaysia) Chow M K (Malaysia) Lee M Y | 21 | 21
6 | (South Korea) Kim H-r (South Korea) Lee S-h | 10 | 17
(Indonesia) D D Haris (Indonesia) T R Nuraidah | 21 | 21

Quarterfinals
(Malaysia) Chow M K (Malaysia) Lee M Y | 14 | 14
(Indonesia) D D Haris (Indonesia) T R Nuraidah | 21 | 21

=== Bottom half ===
==== Section 3 ====
First round
(Hong Kong) Poon L Y (Hong Kong) Tse Y S | 18 | 13
(Japan) M Matsumoto (Japan) W Nagahara | 21 | 21
(Hong Kong) Ng W Y (Hong Kong) Yuen S Y | 21 | 21
PFQ | (Thailand) S Paewsampran (Thailand) K Sudjaipraparat | 19 | 16
(South Korea) Baek H-n (South Korea) Lee Y-r | 21 | 16 | 21
(Chinese Taipei) Chiang K-h (Chinese Taipei) Hung S-h | 18 | 21 | 12
(Chinese Taipei) Lin X-m (Chinese Taipei) Wu F-c | 21 | 17 | 16
4 | (Malaysia) Lim Y L (Malaysia) Yap C W | 19 | 21 | 21

Second round
(Japan) M Matsumoto (Japan) W Nagahara | 21 | 21
(Hong Kong) Ng W Y (Hong Kong) Yuen S Y | 16 | 11
(South Korea) Baek H-n (South Korea) Lee Y-r | 21 | 21
4 | (Malaysia) Lim Y L (Malaysia) Yap C W | 12 | 15

Quarterfinals
(Japan) M Matsumoto (Japan) W Nagahara | 21 | 15 | 14
(South Korea) Baek H-n (South Korea) Lee Y-r | 19 | 21 | 21

==== Section 4 ====
First round
(Thailand) C Chaladchalam (Thailand) P Muenwong | 21 | 21
Q3 | (Thailand) R Iamratanamaetheekul (Thailand) S Katethong | 15 | 14
(Chinese Taipei) Chang H-t (Chinese Taipei) Yu C-h | 11 | 7
7 | (South Korea) Kim S-y (South Korea) Kong H-y | 21 | 21
(Chinese Taipei) Chang C-h (Chinese Taipei) Yang C-t | 21 | 14 | 13
(Japan) N Matsuyama (Japan) C Shida | 16 | 21 | 21
(Chinese Taipei) Cheng Y-c (Chinese Taipei) Hu L-f | 11 | 18
2 | (Indonesia) A S Awanda (Indonesia) N K M Istirani | 21 | 21

Second round
(Thailand) C Chaladchalam (Thailand) P Muenwong | 21 | 17 | 19
7 | (South Korea) Kim S-y (South Korea) Kong H-y | 17 | 21 | 21
(Japan) N Matsuyama (Japan) C Shida | 21 | 8 | 12
2 | (Indonesia) A S Awanda (Indonesia) N K M Istirani | 18 | 21 | 21

Quarterfinals
7 | (South Korea) Kim S-y (South Korea) Kong H-y | 21 | 16 | 21
2 | (Indonesia) A S Awanda (Indonesia) N K M Istirani | 16 | 21 | 17

== Mixed doubles ==
=== Seeds ===
1. (Hong Kong) Lee Chun Hei / Chau Hoi Wah (semifinals)
2. (Hong Kong) Tang Chun Man / Tse Ying Suet (quarterfinals)
3. (Singapore) Terry Hee Yong Kai / Tan Wei Han (quarterfinals)
4. (Russia) Evgenij Dremin / Evgenia Dimova (first round)
5. (China) Zheng Siwei / Huang Yaqiong (champion)
6. (South Korea) Seo Seung-jae / Kim Ha-na (final)
7. (China) Han Chengkai / Tang Jinhua (quarterfinals)
8. (Malaysia) Chan Peng Soon / Cheah Yee See (semifinals)

=== Finals ===
Semifinals
1 | (Hong Kong) Lee Chun Hei (Hong Kong) Chau Hoi Wah | 21 | 15 | 11
6 | (South Korea) Seo Seung-jae (South Korea) Kim Ha-na | 19 | 21 | 21
8 | (Malaysia) Chan Peng Soon (Malaysia) Cheah Yee See | 12 | 12
5 | (China) Zheng Siwei (China) Huang Yaqiong | 21 | 21

Final
6 | (South Korea) Seo Seung-jae (South Korea) Kim Ha-na | 14 | 11
5 | (China) Zheng Siwei (China) Huang Yaqiong | 21 | 21

=== Top half ===
==== Section 1 ====
First round
1 | (Hong Kong) Lee C H (Hong Kong) Chau H W | 21 | 21
(Chinese Taipei) Liao M-c (Chinese Taipei) Chen H-h | 17 | 10
PFQ | (Chinese Taipei) Po L-w (Chinese Taipei) Chang C-h | 21 | 21
WC | (Macau) Leong I C (Macau) Ng W C | 10 | 5
7 | (China) Han CK (China) Tang JH | 21 | 21
(Chinese Taipei) Chang K-c (Chinese Taipei) Yu C-h | 9 | 16
Q3 | (Chinese Taipei) Su C-h (Chinese Taipei) Hsieh P-s | 13 | 23 | 23
(Thailand) S Jomkoh (Thailand) K Sudjaipraparat | 21 | 21 | 21

Second round
1 | (Hong Kong) Lee C H (Hong Kong) Chau H W | 17 | 21 | 21
PFQ | (Chinese Taipei) Po L-w (Chinese Taipei) Chang C-h | 21 | 14 | 14
7 | (China) Han CK (China) Tang JH | 21 | 15 | 21
Q3 | (Chinese Taipei) Su C-h (Chinese Taipei) Hsieh P-s | 14 | 21 | 8

Quarterfinals
1 | (Hong Kong) Lee C H (Hong Kong) Chau H W | 21 | 21
7 | (China) Han CK (China) Tang JH | 14 | 8

==== Section 2 ====
First round
4 | (Russia) E Dremin (Russia) E Dimova | 21 | 17 | 13
(Hong Kong) Tam C H (Hong Kong) Ng T Y | 19 | 21 | 21
Q2 | (Indonesia) A E Prasetya (Indonesia) M D Oktavianti | 21 | 21
PFQ | (Chinese Taipei) Wu Y-c (Chinese Taipei) Yang C-t | 18 | 17
6 | (South Korea) Seo S-j (South Korea) Kim H-n | 24 | 13 | 21
(Chinese Taipei) Tseng M-h (Chinese Taipei) Hu L-f | 22 | 21 | 12
(Chinese Taipei) Yang P-h (Chinese Taipei) Wen H-y | 15 | 18
(Malaysia) Hoo P R (Malaysia) Peck Y W | 21 | 21

Second round
(Hong Kong) Tam C H (Hong Kong) Ng T Y | 15 | 21 | 21
Q2 | (Indonesia) A E Prasetya (Indonesia) M D Oktavianti | 21 | 15 | 13
6 | (South Korea) Seo S-j (South Korea) Kim H-n | 21 | 17 | 21
(Malaysia) Hoo P R (Malaysia) Peck Y W | 15 | 21 | 17

Quarterfinals
(Hong Kong) Tam C H (Hong Kong) Ng T Y | 15 | 16
6 | (South Korea) Seo S-j (South Korea) Kim H-n | 21 | 21

=== Bottom half ===
==== Section 3 ====
First round
(Hong Kong) Mak H C (Hong Kong) Yeung N T | 18 | 20
(Malaysia) M A Abdul Latif (Indonesia) R A Riodingin | 21 | 22
(Indonesia) Y E Saputra (Indonesia) M G Islami | 13 | 19
8 | (Malaysia) Chan P S (Malaysia) Cheah Y S | 21 | 21
(Chinese Taipei) Lu C-p (Chinese Taipei) Chang H-t | 14 | 12
Q1 | (Hong Kong) Chang T C (Hong Kong) Ng W Y | 21 | 21
(China) Zhou HD (China) Chen L | 19 | 12
3 | (Singapore) T Hee (Singapore) Tan W H | 21 | 21

Second round
(Malaysia) M A Abdul Latif (Indonesia) R A Riodingin | 18 | 10
8 | (Malaysia) Chan P S (Malaysia) Cheah Y S | 21 | 21
Q1 | (Hong Kong) Chang T C (Hong Kong) Ng W Y | 15 | 18
3 | (Singapore) T Hee (Singapore) Tan W H | 21 | 21

Quarterfinals
8 | (Malaysia) Chan P S (Malaysia) Cheah Y S | 21 | 21
3 | (Singapore) T Hee (Singapore) Tan W H | 18 | 10

==== Section 4 ====
First round
(Chinese Taipei) Lee Y (Chinese Taipei) Hsu Y-c | 21 | 21
(Hong Kong) Ho W L (Hong Kong) Yuen S Y | 14 | 12
(South Korea) Kim W-h (South Korea) Lee Y-r | 14 | 17
5 | (China) Zheng SW (China) Huang YQ | 21 | 21
(Thailand) P Kuna-Anuvit (Thailand) S Paewsampran | 14 | 19
(South Korea) Kim H-t (South Korea) Baek H-n | 21 | 21
Q4 | (Hong Kong) Law C H (Hong Kong) Poon L Y | 13 | 19
2 | (Hong Kong) Tang C M (Hong Kong) Tse Y S | 21 | 21

Second round
(Chinese Taipei) Lee Y (Chinese Taipei) Hsu Y-c | 12 | 14
5 | (China) Zheng SW (China) Huang YQ | 21 | 21
(South Korea) Kim H-t (South Korea) Baek H-n | 12 | 16
2 | (Hong Kong) Tang C M (Hong Kong) Tse Y S | 21 | 21

Quarterfinals
5 | (China) Zheng SW (China) Huang YQ | 21 | 21
2 | (Hong Kong) Tang C M (Hong Kong) Tse Y S | 18 | 18

| Preceded by 2017 Bitburger Open Grand Prix Gold | BWF Grand Prix Gold and Grand Prix; 2017 BWF Season | Succeeded by 2017 Scottish Open Grand Prix |
