= 2022 Korea Masters =

Badminton tournament in Korea

Tournament details
- Dates: 12–17 April
- Edition: 14th
- Level: Super 300
- Total prize money: US$180,000
- Venue: Gwangju Women's University Stadium
- Location: Gwangju, South Korea

Champions
- Men's singles: (South Korea) Jeon Hyeok-jin
- Women's singles: (China) He Bingjiao
- Men's doubles: (South Korea) Kim Gi-jung (South Korea) Kim Sa-rang
- Women's doubles: (South Korea) Kim So-yeong (South Korea) Kong Hee-yong
- Mixed doubles: (China) Wang Yilyu (China) Huang Dongping

The 2022 Korea Masters was a badminton tournament that took place at Gwangju Women's University Stadium in Gwangju, South Korea, from 12 to 17 April 2022 and had a total prize of $180,000.

== Tournament ==
The 2022 Korea Masters was the ninth tournament of the 2022 BWF World Tour and was part of the Korea Masters championships, which had been held since 2007. This tournament was organized by the Badminton Korea Association with sanction from the BWF.

=== Venue ===
This international tournament was held at Gwangju Women's University Stadium in Gwangju, South Korea.

=== Point distribution ===
Below is the point distribution table for each phase of the tournament based on the BWF points system for the BWF World Tour Super 300 event.

| Winner | Runner-up | 3/4 | 5/8 | 9/16 | 17/32 |
|---|---|---|---|---|---|
| 7,000 | 5,950 | 4,900 | 3,850 | 2,750 | 1,670 |

=== Prize pool ===
The total prize money was US$180,000 with the distribution of the prize money in accordance with BWF regulations.

| Event | Winner | Finalist | Semi-finals | Quarter-finals | Last 16 |
| Singles | $13,500 | $6,840 | $2,610 | $1,080 | $630 |
| Doubles | $14,220 | $6,840 | $2,520 | $1,305 | $675 |

== Men's singles ==
=== Seeds ===
1. (India) Srikanth Kidambi (withdrew)
2. (Thailand) Kunlavut Vitidsarn (withdrew)
3. (Thailand) Kantaphon Wangcharoen (withdrew)
4. (China) Lu Guangzu (quarter-finals)
5. (South Korea) Heo Kwang-hee (second round)
6. (Thailand) Sitthikom Thammasin (semi-finals)
7. (China) Zhao Junpeng (first round)
8. (India) Parupalli Kashyap (withdrew)

=== Finals ===
Semi-finals
(Japan) Kodai Naraoka | 21 | 21 | 21
(Malaysia) Soong Joo Ven | 17 | 23 | 11
6 | (Thailand) Sitthikom Thammasin | 18 | 15
PFR | (South Korea) Jeon Hyeok-jin | 21 | 21

Final
(Japan) Kodai Naraoka | 17 | 16
PFR | (South Korea) Jeon Hyeok-jin | 21 | 21

=== Top half ===
==== Section 1 ====
First round
PFR | (South Korea) Jung M-s | 14 | 22 | 10
(China) Li SF | 21 | 20 | 21
(Japan) K Naraoka | 19 | 21 | 21
PFR | (South Korea) Cho G-y | 21 | 12 | 13
PFR | (Algeria) K Mammeri | 19 | 14
(China) Weng HY | 21 | 21
PFR | (South Korea) Lee S-k | 11 | 6
(France) L Claerbout | 21 | 21

Second round
(China) Li SF | 21 | 12 | 14
(Japan) K Naraoka | 13 | 21 | 21
(China) Weng HY
(France) L Claerbout | w | / | o

Quarter-finals
(Japan) K Naraoka | 21 | 21
(France) L Claerbout | 15 | 17

==== Section 2 ====
First round
PFR | (South Korea) Yoo T-b | 21 | 15 | 14
(Israel) M Zilberman | 18 | 21 | 21
(Finland) K Koljonen | 22 | 21
PFR | (South Korea) Kim J-w | 20 | 17
5 | (South Korea) Heo K-h | w | / | o
(India) C Sen
(Malaysia) Soong J V | 21 | 21
(Singapore) J Teh | 8 | 18

Second round
(Israel) M Zilberman | 21 | 19 | 22
(Finland) K Koljonen | 12 | 21 | 20
5 | (South Korea) Heo K-h | 11 | 19
(Malaysia) Soong J V | 21 | 21

Quarter-finals
(Israel) M Zilberman | 21 | 18
(Malaysia) Soong J V | 23 | 21

=== Bottom half ===
==== Section 3 ====
First round
(Austria) L Wraber | 10 | 13
(France) A Merklé | 21 | 21
(Czech Republic) J Louda | 12 | 17
6 | (Thailand) S Thammasin | 21 | 21
(India) K George
(Algeria) Y S Medel | w | / | o
(South Korea) Lee D-k | 13 | 19
4 | (China) Lu GZ | 21 | 21

Second round
(France) A Merklé | 21 | 14 | 13
6 | (Thailand) S Thammasin | 19 | 21 | 21
(Algeria) Y S Medel | 10 | 5
4 | (China) Lu GZ | 21 | 21

Quarter-finals
6 | (Thailand) S Thammasin | 16 | 21 | 21
4 | (China) Lu GZ | 21 | 12 | 15

==== Section 4 ====
First round
(Malaysia) Cheam J W | 11 | 11
PFR | (South Korea) Jeon H-j | 21 | 21
(South Korea) Kim D-h | 21 | 17 | 21
7 | (China) Zhao JP | 16 | 21 | 16
(Denmark) V Svendsen | 9 | 21 | 21
PFR | (South Korea) Lee Y-g | 21 | 18 | 19
(South Korea) Son W-h | 21 | 21
PFR | (South Korea) Park S-y | 17 | 11

Second round
PFR | (South Korea) Jeon H-j | 23 | 21
(South Korea) Kim D-h | 21 | 19
(Denmark) V Svendsen | 6 | 17
(South Korea) Son W-h | 21 | 21

Quarter-finals
PFR | (South Korea) Jeon H-j | 21 | 21
(South Korea) Son W-h | 3 | 16

== Women's singles ==
=== Seeds ===
1. (China) Chen Yufei (final)
2. (South Korea) An Se-young (semi-finals)
3. (Thailand) Ratchanok Intanon (withdrew)
4. (China) He Bingjiao (champion)
5. (Thailand) Pornpawee Chochuwong (first round)
6. (Thailand) Busanan Ongbamrungphan (withdrew)
7. (Canada) Michelle Li (first round)
8. (Singapore) Yeo Jia Min (quarter-finals)

=== Finals ===
Semi-finals
1 | (China) Chen Yufei | 21 | 19 | 21
(China) Wang Zhiyi | 7 | 21 | 17
4 | (China) He Bingjiao | 21 | 21
2 | (South Korea) An Se-young | 11 | 13

Final
1 | (China) Chen Yufei | 14 | 21 | 9
4 | (China) He Bingjiao | 21 | 14 | 21

=== Top half ===
==== Section 1 ====
First round
1 | (China) Chen YF | 21 | 21
(Singapore) J Hooi | 17 | 10
(France) Y Hoyaux | 8 | 17
(Japan) S Kawakami | 21 | 21
5 | (Thailand) P Chochuwong | 17 | 6
(Japan) A Takahashi | 21 | 21
(United States) L Lam | 21 | 21
(China) Zhang YM | 19 | 17

Second round
1 | (China) Chen YF | 21 | 21
(Japan) S Kawakami | 14 | 17
(Japan) A Takahashi | 21 | 21
(United States) L Lam | 18 | 17

Quarter-finals
1 | (China) Chen YF | 21 | 21
(Japan) A Takahashi | 14 | 10

==== Section 2 ====
First round
PFR | (Malaysia) Goh J W | 21 | 19 | 21
(Thailand) P Chaiwan | 12 | 21 | 11
(South Korea) Sim Y-j | 18 | 16
(China) Wang ZY | 21 | 21
8 | (Singapore) Yeo J M | w | / | o
(India) T Hemanth
PFR | (Canada) C Choi | 8 | 9
PFR | (South Korea) Kim S-m | 21 | 21

Second round
PFR | (Malaysia) Goh J W | 22 | 7 | 12
(China) Wang ZY | 20 | 21 | 21
8 | (Singapore) Yeo J M | 21 | 21
PFR | (South Korea) Kim S-m | 14 | 14

Quarter-finals
(China) Wang ZY | 21 | 21
8 | (Singapore) Yeo J M | 13 | 13

=== Bottom half ===
==== Section 3 ====
First round
PFR | (Hungary) D Gonda | 15 | 10
(Israel) K Polikarpova | 21 | 21
(Czech Republic) T Švábíková | 12 | 11
PFR | (South Korea) Lee S-y | 21 | 21
(South Korea) Kim G-e | 21 | 21
PFR | (South Korea) Kim J-e | 16 | 14
PFR | (South Korea) Jeon J-i | 22 | 8 | 13
4 | (China) He BJ | 20 | 21 | 21

Second round
(Israel) K Polikarpova | 10 | 12
PFR | (South Korea) Lee S-y | 21 | 21
(South Korea) Kim G-e | 14 | 14
4 | (China) He BJ | 21 | 21

Quarter-finals
PFR | (South Korea) Lee S-y | 9 | 10
4 | (China) He BJ | 21 | 21

==== Section 4 ====
First round
(Czech Republic) K Tomalová | 15 | 10
(Thailand) S Katethong | 21 | 21
(Myanmar) Thet H T | 22 | 21
7 | (Canada) M Li | 20 | 16
PFR | (South Korea) Park G-e | 9 | 16
(Japan) A Ohori | 21 | 21
(China) Han Y | 10 | 16
2 | (South Korea) An S-y | 21 | 21

Second round
(Thailand) S Katethong | 12 | 21 | 21
(Myanmar) Thet H T | 21 | 18 | 10
(Japan) A Ohori | 17 | 16
2 | (South Korea) An S-y | 21 | 21

Quarter-finals
(Thailand) S Katethong | 8 | 14
2 | (South Korea) An S-y | 21 | 21

== Men's doubles ==
=== Seeds ===
1. (Malaysia) Ong Yew Sin / Teo Ee Yi (withdrew)
2. (South Korea) Ko Sung-hyun / Shin Baek-cheol (quarter-finals)
3. (Indonesia) Pramudya Kusumawardana / Yeremia Rambitan (first round)
4. (Indonesia) Bagas Maulana / Muhammad Shohibul Fikri (quarter-finals)
5. (Indonesia) Leo Rolly Carnando / Daniel Marthin (first round)
6. (China) Liu Cheng / Zhang Nan (first round)
7. (India) Arjun M.R. / Dhruv Kapila (withdrew)
8. (India) Krishna Prasad Garaga / Vishnuvardhan Goud Panjala (withdrew)

=== Finals ===
Semi-finals
(South Korea) Kim Gi-jung (South Korea) Kim Sa-rang | 22 | 12 | 21
(Japan) Hiroki Okamura (Japan) Masayuki Onodera | 20 | 21 | 19
(South Korea) Choi Sol-gyu (South Korea) Kim Won-ho | 19 | 16
(China) Liu Yuchen (China) Ou Xuanyi | 21 | 21

Final
(South Korea) Kim Gi-jung (South Korea) Kim Sa-rang | 21 | 21
(China) Liu Yuchen (China) Ou Xuanyi | 14 | 16

=== Top half ===
==== Section 1 ====
First round
PFR | (Thailand) P Thongkham (Thailand) T Udomsipronkul | 10 | 18
(China) He JT (China) Zhou HD | 21 | 21
(South Korea) Kang M-h (South Korea) Seo S-j | 21 | 21
(Algeria) K Mammeri (Algeria) Y S Medel | 6 | 10
6 | (China) Liu C (China) Zhang N | 21 | 15 | 11
(South Korea) Kim J-hy (South Korea) Lee Y-d | 18 | 21 | 21
(South Korea) Kim G-j (South Korea) Kim S-r | 17 | 21 | 21
(South Korea) Kang J-w (South Korea) Kim D-y | 21 | 14 | 18

Second round
(China) He JT (China) Zhou HD | 16 | 19
(South Korea) Kang M-h (South Korea) Seo S-j | 21 | 21
(South Korea) Kim J-hy (South Korea) Lee Y-d | 20 | 10
(South Korea) Kim G-j (South Korea) Kim S-r | 22 | 21

Quarter-finals
(South Korea) Kang M-h (South Korea) Seo S-j | 19 | 13
(South Korea) Kim G-j (South Korea) Kim S-r | 21 | 21

==== Section 2 ====
First round
4 | (Indonesia) M S Fikri (Indonesia) B Maulana | 21 | 21
(South Korea) Kim J-hw (South Korea) Kim Y-h | 17 | 17
(China) Ren XY (China) Tan Q | 21 | 21
PFR | (South Korea) Kim H-t (South Korea) Yoon D-i | 17 | 12
8 | (India) K P Garaga (India) V G Panjala
(Malaysia) Goh V S (Malaysia) Low J S | w | / | o
(Japan) H Okamura (Japan) M Onodera | 21 | 21
(Czech Republic) O Král (Czech Republic) A Mendrek | 19 | 15

Second round
4 | (Indonesia) M S Fikri (Indonesia) B Maulana | 17 | 26 | 22
(China) Ren XY (China) Tan Q | 21 | 24 | 20
(Malaysia) Goh V S (Malaysia) Low J S | 21 | 14 | 22
(Japan) H Okamura (Japan) M Onodera | 16 | 21 | 24

Quarter-finals
4 | (Indonesia) M S Fikri (Indonesia) B Maulana | 23 | 21 | 20
(Japan) H Okamura (Japan) M Onodera | 25 | 19 | 22

=== Bottom half ===
==== Section 3 ====
First round
(India) P. S. Ravikrishna (India) S P Udayakumar
(Singapore) T Hee (Singapore) Loh K H | w | / | o
(Malaysia) N M Azriyn A (Malaysia) Lim K W | 19 | 18
PFR | (South Korea) Na G-m (South Korea) Noh J-s | 21 | 21
(South Korea) Choi S-g (South Korea) Kim W-h | 21 | 21
(South Korea) Jin Y (South Korea) Na S-s | 19 | 11
(Malaysia) Tan K M (Malaysia) Tan W K | 21 | 16 | 22
3 | (Indonesia) P Kusumawardana (Indonesia) Y Rambitan | 11 | 21 | 20

Second round
(Singapore) T Hee (Singapore) Loh K H | 21 | 21
PFR | (South Korea) Na G-m (South Korea) Noh J-s | 17 | 12
(South Korea) Choi S-g (South Korea) Kim W-h | 21 | 9 | 21
(Malaysia) Tan K M (Malaysia) Tan W K | 17 | 21 | 13

Quarter-finals
(Singapore) T Hee (Singapore) Loh K H | 15 | 11
(South Korea) Choi S-g (South Korea) Kim W-h | 21 | 21

==== Section 4 ====
First round
PFR | (South Korea) Choi H-b (South Korea) Park B-h | w | / | o
(Singapore) D B Chrisnanta (Singapore) A Kwek
(China) Liu YC (China) Ou XY | 13 | 21 | 22
5 | (Indonesia) L R Carnando (Indonesia) D Marthin | 21 | 19 | 20
(South Korea) Jung J-w (South Korea) Park K-h | 21 | 21
(South Korea) Shin T-y (South Korea) Wang C | 14 | 12
(India) I Bhatnagar (India) K. Sai Pratheek
2 | (South Korea) Ko S-h (South Korea) Shin B-c | w | / | o

Second round
PFR | (South Korea) Choi H-b (South Korea) Park B-h | 13 | 15
(China) Liu YC (China) Ou XY | 21 | 21
(South Korea) Jung J-w (South Korea) Park K-h | 13 | 21 | 19
2 | (South Korea) Ko S-h (South Korea) Shin B-c | 21 | 12 | 21

Quarter-finals
(China) Liu YC (China) Ou XY | 21 | 18 | 21
2 | (South Korea) Ko S-h (South Korea) Shin B-c | 17 | 21 | 13

== Women's doubles ==
=== Seeds ===
1. (South Korea) Lee So-hee / Shin Seung-chan (withdrew)
2. (South Korea) Kim So-yeong / Kong Hee-yong (champions)
3. (India) Ashwini Ponnappa / N. Sikki Reddy (withdrew)
4. (China) Liu Xuanxuan / Xia Yuting (second round)
5. (South Korea) Jeong Na-eun / Kim Hye-jeong (withdrew)
6. (Thailand) Laksika Kanlaha / Phataimas Muenwong (second round)
7. (Malaysia) Vivian Hoo / Lim Chiew Sien (withdrew)
8. (Canada) Catherine Choi / Josephine Wu (second round)

=== Finals ===
Semi-finals
(South Korea) Baek Ha-na (South Korea) Lee Yu-rim | 21 | 19 | 21
(China) Du Yue (China) Li Wenmei | 18 | 21 | 16
(South Korea) Eom Hye-won (South Korea) Kim Bo-ryeong | 18 | 9
2 | (South Korea) Kim So-yeong (South Korea) Kong Hee-yong | 21 | 21

Final
(South Korea) Baek Ha-na (South Korea) Lee Yu-rim | 17 | 12
2 | (South Korea) Kim So-yeong (South Korea) Kong Hee-yong | 21 | 21

=== Top half ===
==== Section 1 ====
First round
(South Korea) Lee Se-h (South Korea) Yoon T-k
(South Korea) Baek H-n (South Korea) Lee Y-r | w | / | o

Second round
1 | (South Korea) Lee S-h (South Korea) Shin S-c
(South Korea) Kim A-y (South Korea) Kim S-j | w | / | o
6 | (Thailand) L Kanlaha (Thailand) P Muenwong | 12 | 17
(South Korea) Baek H-n (South Korea) Lee Y-r | 21 | 21

Quarter-finals
(South Korea) Kim A-y (South Korea) Kim S-j | 8 | 17
(South Korea) Baek H-n (South Korea) Lee Y-r | 21 | 21

==== Section 2 ====
First round
(China) Zhang SX (China) Zheng Y | 21 | 21
(South Korea) Bang J-s (South Korea) Kim M-s | 13 | 14

Second round
4 | (China) Liu XX (China) Xia YT | 21 | 12 | 12
(China) Du Y (China) Li WM | 14 | 21 | 21
8 | (Canada) C Choi (Canada) J Wu | 16 | 10
(China) Zhang SX (China) Zheng Y | 21 | 21

Quarter-finals
(China) Du Y (China) Li WM | 21 | 21
(China) Zhang SX (China) Zheng Y | 15 | 19

=== Bottom half ===
==== Section 3 ====
First round
(South Korea) Eom H-w (South Korea) Kim B-r | 21 | 21
(South Korea) Kim M-j (South Korea) Seong S-y | 18 | 17
(Thailand) O Jongsathapornparn (Thailand) A Povanon
(Thailand) P Phatcharaphisutsin (Thailand) N Sukklad | w | / | o

Second round
(South Korea) Eom H-w (South Korea) Kim B-r | w | / | o
5 | (South Korea) Jeong N-e (South Korea) Kim H-j
(Thailand) P Phatcharaphisutsin (Thailand) N Sukklad | w | / | o
3 | (India) A Ponnappa (India) N. S Reddy

Quarter-finals
(South Korea) Eom H-w (South Korea) Kim B-r | 21 | 21
(Thailand) P Phatcharaphisutsin (Thailand) N Sukklad | 10 | 7

==== Section 4 ====
First round
(South Korea) Kim Y-j (South Korea) Lee Y-w | 18 | 21 | 17
(South Korea) Chang Y-n (South Korea) Jung K-e | 21 | 13 | 21

Second round
(South Korea) Chang Y-n (South Korea) Jung K-e | w | / | o
7 | (Malaysia) V Hoo (Malaysia) Lim C S
(Singapore) Jin YJ (Singapore) C Wong | 14 | 12
2 | (South Korea) Kim S-y (South Korea) Kong H-y | 21 | 21

Quarter-finals
(South Korea) Chang Y-n (South Korea) Jung K-e | 10^{r}
2 | (South Korea) Kim S-y (South Korea) Kong H-y | 21

== Mixed doubles ==
=== Seeds ===
1. (China) Wang Yilyu / Huang Dongping (champions)
2. (South Korea) Seo Seung-jae / Chae Yoo-jung (withdrew)
3. (Malaysia) Tan Kian Meng / Lai Pei Jing (withdrew)
4. (Malaysia) Goh Soon Huat / Shevon Jemie Lai (semi-finals)
5. (South Korea) Ko Sung-hyun / Eom Hye-won (first round)
6. (Indonesia) Rinov Rivaldy / Pitha Haningtyas Mentari (second round)
7. (Indonesia) Adnan Maulana / Mychelle Crhystine Bandaso (first round)
8. (Malaysia) Chan Peng Soon / Toh Ee Wei (second round)

=== Finals ===
Semi-finals
1 | (China) Wang Yilyu (China) Huang Dongping | 21 | 21
(South Korea) Jin Yong (South Korea) Lee Yu-rim | 12 | 8
4 | (Malaysia) Goh Soon Huat (Malaysia) Shevon Jemie Lai | 11 | 15
(China) Ou Xuanyi (China) Huang Yaqiong | 21 | 21

Final
1 | (China) Wang Yilyu (China) Huang Dongping | 21 | 21
(China) Ou Xuanyi (China) Huang Yaqiong | 17 | 17

=== Top half ===
==== Section 1 ====
First round
1 | (China) Wang YL (China) Huang DP | 21 | 19 | 21
(China) Guo XW (China) Liu XX | 17 | 21 | 10
(South Korea) Jung J-w (South Korea) Lee Y-w | 21 | 21
(South Korea) Na S-s (South Korea) Kim M-j | 13 | 15
7 | (Indonesia) A Maulana (Indonesia) M C Bandaso | 19 | 18
(South Korea) Shin T-y (South Korea) Chang Y-n | 21 | 21
(Japan) Y Nishikawa (Japan) S Ozaki | 22 | 21 | 21
(Singapore) A Kwek (Singapore) Jin YJ | 24 | 19 | 12

Second round
1 | (China) Wang YL (China) Huang DP | 21 | 21
(South Korea) Jung J-w (South Korea) Lee Y-w | 12 | 18
(South Korea) Shin T-y (South Korea) Chang Y-n | 21 | 14 | 18
(Japan) Y Nishikawa (Japan) S Ozaki | 19 | 21 | 21

Quarter-finals
1 | (China) Wang YL (China) Huang DP | 21 | 21
(Japan) Y Nishikawa (Japan) S Ozaki | 4 | 6

==== Section 2 ====
First round
3 | (Malaysia) Tan K M (Malaysia) Lai P J
(South Korea) Jin Y (South Korea) Lee Y-r | w | / | o
(South Korea) Kim D-y (South Korea) Lee Se-h
(Japan) H Midorikawa (Japan) N Saito | w | / | o
8 | (Malaysia) Chan P S (Malaysia) Toh E W | 21 | 22
PFR | (Malaysia) Soong J V (Malaysia) Goh J W | 11 | 20
(South Korea) Park K-h (South Korea) Kim Y-j | 6 | 15
(China) Zheng SW (China) Zhang SX | 21 | 21

Second round
(South Korea) Jin Y (South Korea) Lee Y-r | 21 | 21
(Japan) H Midorikawa (Japan) N Saito | 16 | 14
8 | (Malaysia) Chan P S (Malaysia) Toh E W | 18 | 14
(China) Zheng SW (China) Zhang SX | 21 | 21

Quarter-finals
(South Korea) Jin Y (South Korea) Lee Y-r | 21 | 15 | 21
(China) Zheng SW (China) Zhang SX | 14 | 21 | 18

=== Bottom half ===
==== Section 3 ====
First round
(South Korea) Kim Y-h (South Korea) Kim H-j | 21 | 21
PFR | (France) L Claerbout (France) Y Hoyaux | 9 | 13
(Singapore) T Hee (Singapore) Tan W H | 21 | 19 | 21
5 | (South Korea) Ko S-h (South Korea) Eom H-w | 18 | 21 | 16
(India) K. Sai Pratheek (India) N. S Reddy
(Israel) M Zilberman (Israel) S Zilberman | w | / | o
(South Korea) Wang C (South Korea) Jung K-e | 12 | 12
4 | (Malaysia) Goh S H (Malaysia) S J Lai | 21 | 21

Second round
(South Korea) Kim Y-h (South Korea) Kim H-j | 20 | 21
(Singapore) T Hee (Singapore) Tan W H | 22 | 23
(Israel) M Zilberman (Israel) S Zilberman | 5 | 8
4 | (Malaysia) Goh S H (Malaysia) S J Lai | 21 | 21

Quarter-finals
(Singapore) T Hee (Singapore) Tan W H | 16 | 11
4 | (Malaysia) Goh S H (Malaysia) S J Lai | 21 | 21

==== Section 4 ====
First round
(China) Ou XY (China) Huang YQ | 21 | 21
(Malaysia) Choong H J (Malaysia) Yap C W | 16 | 5
(Egypt) A H Elgamal (Egypt) D Hany
6 | (Indonesia) R Rivaldy (Indonesia) P H Mentari | w | / | o
(South Korea) Kim W-h (South Korea) Jeong N-e
(South Korea) Kang M-h (South Korea) Baek H-n | w | / | o
(Canada) T A Lindeman (Canada) J Wu | w | / | o
2 | (South Korea) Seo S-j (South Korea) Chae Y-j

Second round
(China) Ou XY (China) Huang YQ | 21 | 21
6 | (Indonesia) R Rivaldy (Indonesia) P H Mentari | 13 | 18
(South Korea) Kang M-h (South Korea) Baek H-n | 21 | 21
(Canada) T A Lindeman (Canada) J Wu | 12 | 19

Quarter-finals
(China) Ou XY (China) Huang YQ | 21 | 21
(South Korea) Kang M-h (South Korea) Baek H-n | 15 | 10

| Preceded by 2022 Korea Open | BWF World Tour; 2022 BWF season | Succeeded by 2022 Thailand Open |
