= Baek Ha-na =

South Korean badminton player

Personal information
- Born: 22 September 2000 (age 26) Gimcheon, South Korea
- Height: 1.64 m (5 ft 5 in)

Sport
- Country: South Korea
- Sport: Badminton
- Handedness: Right

Women's & mixed doubles
- Highest ranking: 1 (WD with Lee So-hee, 29 October 2024); 10 (WD with Jung Kyung-eun, 17 March 2020); 15 (WD with Lee Yu-lim, 29 November 2022); 87 (XD with Kang Min-hyuk, 12 March 2019)
- Current ranking: 2 (WD with Lee So-hee, 6 October 2026)
- BWF profile
Medal record
Women's badminton
Representing South Korea
World Championships
Gold medal – first place	2026 New Delhi	Women's doubles
Sudirman Cup
Silver medal – second place	2023 Suzhou	Mixed team
Silver medal – second place	2025 Xiamen	Mixed team
Uber Cup
Gold medal – first place	2022 Bangkok	Women's team
Gold medal – first place	2026 Horsens	Women's team
Bronze medal – third place	2018 Bangkok	Women's team
Bronze medal – third place	2024 Chengdu	Women's team
Asian Games
Gold medal – first place	2022 Hangzhou	Women's team
Gold medal – first place	2026 Aichi–Nagoya	Women's doubles
Silver medal – second place	2022 Hangzhou	Women's doubles
Bronze medal – third place	2026 Aichi–Nagoya	Women's team
Asian Championships
Gold medal – first place	2024 Ningbo	Women's doubles
Silver medal – second place	2023 Dubai	Women's doubles
Asia Mixed Team Championships
Silver medal – second place	2023 Dubai	Mixed team
Asia Team Championships
Gold medal – first place	2026 Qingdao	Women's team
Silver medal – second place	2022 Selangor	Women's team
Bronze medal – third place	2018 Alor Setar	Women's team
World Junior Championships
Gold medal – first place	2017 Yogyakarta	Girls' doubles
Bronze medal – third place	2017 Yogyakarta	Mixed team
Asian Junior Championships
Gold medal – first place	2017 Jakarta	Girls' doubles
Gold medal – first place	2017 Jakarta	Mixed team
Silver medal – second place	2016 Bangkok	Mixed team
Bronze medal – third place	2017 Jakarta	Mixed doubles

Baek Ha-na (Korean: 백하나; born 22 September 2000) is a South Korean badminton player who attended Cheongsong Girls' High School. She started playing badminton in 2009 after being recommended by her brother, and was selected to join the national team in 2017. She was a gold medalist in the girls' doubles event at the 2017 Asian Junior Championships and the World Junior Championships with Lee Yu-lim. Their first major result in a senior event came when she and Lee reached the final at the 2017 Macau Open, but lost to Chinese pair Huang Yaqiong and Yu Xiaohan with the score 10–21, 17–21. Baek and Lee So-hee competed for South Korea at the 2024 Summer Olympics in the women's doubles event. Baek and Lee became the first Korean Women's double winner since 31 years when they won the 2026 BWF World Championships in New Delhi.

== Achievements ==
=== World Championships ===
Women's doubles
Year	Venue	Partner	Opponent	Score	Result	Ref.
2026	Indira Gandhi Arena, New Delhi, India	(South Korea) Lee So-hee	(China) Liu Shengshu (China) Tan Ning	21–15, 21–15	Gold	

=== Asian Games ===
Women's doubles
Year	Venue	Partner	Opponent	Score	Result
2022	Binjiang Gymnasium, Hangzhou, China	(South Korea) Lee So-hee	(China) Chen Qingchen (China) Jia Yifan	18–21, 17–21	Silver
2026	Ichinomiya City Municipal Gymnasium, Ichinomiya, Japan	(South Korea) Lee So-hee	(China) Liu Shengshu (China) Tan Ning	26–28, 21–18, 21–18	Gold

=== Asian Championships ===
Women's doubles
Year	Venue	Partner	Opponent	Score	Result
2023	Sheikh Rashid Bin Hamdan Indoor Hall; Dubai, United Arab Emirates	(South Korea) Lee So-hee	(Japan) Yuki Fukushima (Japan) Sayaka Hirota	7–21, 14–21	Silver
2024	Ningbo Olympic Sports Center Gymnasium, Ningbo, China	(South Korea) Lee So-hee	(China) Zhang Shuxian (China) Zheng Yu	23–21, 21–12	Gold

=== World Junior Championships ===
Girls' doubles
Year	Venue	Partner	Opponent	Score	Result
2017	GOR Among Rogo; Yogyakarta, Indonesia	(South Korea) Lee Yu-rim	(Indonesia) Jauza Fadhila Sugiarto (Indonesia) Ribka Sugiarto	18–21, 21–11, 21–3	Gold

=== Asian Junior Championships ===
Girls' doubles
Year	Venue	Partner	Opponent	Score	Result
2017	Jaya Raya Sports Hall Training Center; Jakarta, Indonesia	(South Korea) Lee Yu-rim	(China) Liu Xuanxuan (China) Xia Yuting	21–12, 21–19	Gold

Mixed doubles
Year	Venue	Partner	Opponent	Score	Result
2017	Jaya Raya Sports Hall Training Center; Jakarta, Indonesia	(South Korea) Kang Min-hyuk	(South Korea) Na Sung-seung (South Korea) Seong Ah-yeong	20–22, 21–18, 19–21	Bronze

=== BWF World Tour (12 titles, 16 runners-up) ===
The BWF World Tour, which was announced on 19 March 2017 and implemented in 2018, is a series of elite badminton tournaments sanctioned by the Badminton World Federation (BWF). The BWF World Tour is divided into levels of World Tour Finals, Super 1000, Super 750, Super 500, Super 300, and the BWF Tour Super 100.

Women's doubles
Year	Tournament	Level	Partner	Opponent	Score	Result
2018	Australian Open	Super 300	(South Korea) Lee Yu-lim	(Japan) Ayako Sakuramoto (Japan) Yukiko Takahata	21–23, 18–21	(silver) Runner-up
2019	Lingshui China Masters	Super 100	(South Korea) Kim Hye-rin	(China) Liu Xuanxuan (China) Xia Yuting	21–14, 14–21, 21–15	(gold) Winner
2019	U.S. Open	Super 300	(South Korea) Jung Kyung-eun	(Japan) Nami Matsuyama (Japan) Chiharu Shida	16–21, 16–21	(silver) Runner-up
2019	Hyderabad Open	Super 100	(South Korea) Jung Kyung-eun	(India) Ashwini Ponnappa (India) N. Sikki Reddy	21–17, 21–17	(gold) Winner
2019	Denmark Open	Super 750	(South Korea) Jung Kyung-eun	(China) Chen Qingchen (China) Jia Yifan	9–21, 21–19, 21–15	(gold) Winner
2019	Syed Modi International	Super 300	(South Korea) Jung Kyung-eun	(South Korea) Chang Ye-na (South Korea) Kim Hye-rin	23–21, 21–15	(gold) Winner
2020	Thailand Masters	Super 300	(South Korea) Jung Kyung-eun	(China) Chen Qingchen (China) Jia Yifan	21–17, 17–21, 15–21	(silver) Runner-up
2022	Korea Masters	Super 300	(South Korea) Lee Yu-rim	(South Korea) Kim So-yeong (South Korea) Kong Hee-yong	17–21, 12–21	(silver) Runner-up
2022	Japan Open	Super 750	(South Korea) Lee Yu-lim	(South Korea) Jeong Na-eun (South Korea) Kim Hye-jeong	21–23, 26–28	(silver) Runner-up
2022	Denmark Open	Super 750	(South Korea) Lee So-hee	(China) Chen Qingchen (China) Jia Yifan	12–21, 15–21	(silver) Runner-up
2023	Malaysia Open	Super 1000	(South Korea) Lee Yu-lim	(China) Chen Qingchen (China) Jia Yifan	16–21, 10–21	(silver) Runner-up
2023	Thailand Masters	Super 300	(South Korea) Lee So-hee	(Thailand) Benyapa Aimsaard (Thailand) Nuntakarn Aimsaard	6–21, 11–21	(silver) Runner-up
2023	German Open	Super 300	(South Korea) Lee So-hee	(Japan) Nami Matsuyama (Japan) Chiharu Shida	21–19, 21–15	(gold) Winner
2023	All England Open	Super 1000	(South Korea) Lee So-hee	(South Korea) Kim So-yeong (South Korea) Kong Hee-yong	5–21, 12–21	(silver) Runner-up
2023	Malaysia Masters	Super 500	(South Korea) Lee So-hee	(Malaysia) Pearly Tan (Malaysia) Thinaah Muralitharan	22–20, 8–21, 21–17	(gold) Winner
2023	Singapore Open	Super 750	(South Korea) Lee So-hee	(China) Chen Qingchen (China) Jia Yifan	16–21, 12–21	(silver) Runner-up
2023	Indonesia Open	Super 1000	(South Korea) Lee So-hee	(Japan) Yuki Fukushima (Japan) Sayaka Hirota	22–20, 21–10	(gold) Winner
2023	China Open	Super 1000	(South Korea) Lee So-hee	(China) Chen Qingchen (China) Jia Yifan	11–21, 17–21	(silver) Runner-up
2023	BWF World Tour Finals	World Tour Finals	(South Korea) Lee So-hee	(China) Chen Qingchen (China) Jia Yifan	16–21, 16–21	(silver) Runner-up
2024	All England Open	Super 1000	(South Korea) Lee So-hee	(Japan) Nami Matsuyama (Japan) Chiharu Shida	21–19, 11–21, 21–17	(gold) Winner
2024	Indonesia Open	Super 1000	(South Korea) Lee So-hee	(China) Chen Qingchen (China) Jia Yifan	21–17, 21–13	(gold) Winner
2024	Japan Open	Super 750	(South Korea) Lee So-hee	(China) Liu Shengshu (China) Tan Ning	18–21, 20–22	(silver) Runner-up
2024	BWF World Tour Finals	World Tour Finals	(South Korea) Lee So-hee	(Japan) Nami Matsuyama (Japan) Chiharu Shida	21–19, 21–14	(gold) Winner
2025	Orléans Masters	Super 300	(South Korea) Lee So-hee	(South Korea) Kim Hye-jeong (South Korea) Kong Hee-yong	18–21, 21–23	(silver) Runner-up
2025	Denmark Open	Super 750	(South Korea) Lee So-hee	(South Korea) Kim Hye-jeong (South Korea) Kong Hee-yong	15–21, 21–14, 21–15	(gold) Winner
2025	BWF World Tour Finals	World Tour Finals	(South Korea) Lee So-hee	(Japan) Yuki Fukushima (Japan) Mayu Matsumoto	21–17, 21–11	(gold) Winner
2026	Malaysia Open	Super 1000	(South Korea) Lee So-hee	(China) Liu Shengshu (China) Tan Ning	18–21, 12–21	(silver) Runner-up
2026	All England Open	Super 1000	(South Korea) Lee So-hee	(China) Liu Shengshu (China) Tan Ning	18–21, 12–21	(silver) Runner-up

=== BWF Grand Prix (1 runner-up) ===
The BWF Grand Prix had two levels, the Grand Prix and Grand Prix Gold. It was a series of badminton tournaments sanctioned by the Badminton World Federation (BWF) and played between 2007 and 2017.

Women's doubles
Year	Tournament	Partner	Opponent	Score	Result
2017	Macau Open	(South Korea) Lee Yu-rim	(China) Huang Yaqiong (China) Yu Xiaohan	10–21, 17–21	(silver) Runner-up

BWF Grand Prix Gold tournament
BWF Grand Prix tournament

=== BWF International Challenge/Series (1 title) ===
Women's doubles
Year	Tournament	Partner	Opponent	Score	Result
2018	Vietnam International	(South Korea) Lee Yu-rim	(Malaysia) Chow Mei Kuan (Malaysia) Vivian Hoo	21–19, 17–21, 21–17	(gold) Winner

BWF International Challenge tournament
BWF International Series tournament
