= 2020 Thailand Masters (badminton) =

2020 badminton tournament in Bangkok

Tournament details
- Dates: 21–26 January
- Edition: 5th
- Level: Super 300
- Total prize money: US$170,000
- Venue: Indoor Stadium Huamark
- Location: Bangkok, Thailand

Champions
- Men's singles: (Hong Kong) Ng Ka Long
- Women's singles: (Japan) Akane Yamaguchi
- Men's doubles: (Malaysia) Ong Yew Sin (Malaysia) Teo Ee Yi
- Women's doubles: (China) Chen Qingchen (China) Jia Yifan
- Mixed doubles: (England) Marcus Ellis (England) Lauren Smith

The 2020 Thailand Masters (officially known as the Princess Sirivannavari Thailand Masters 2020 presented by Toyota for sponsorship reasons) was a badminton tournament which took place at Indoor Stadium Huamark in Thailand from 21 to 26 January 2020 and had a total purse of $170,000.

== Tournament ==
The 2020 Thailand Masters was the third tournament of the 2020 BWF World Tour and also part of the Thailand Masters championships which had been held since 2016. This tournament was organized by the Badminton Association of Thailand with sanction from the BWF.

=== Venue ===
This international tournament was held at Indoor Stadium Huamark in Bangkok, Thailand.

=== Point distribution ===
Below is the point distribution for each phase of the tournament based on the BWF points system for the BWF World Tour Super 300 event.

Winner	Runner-up	3/4	5/8	9/16	17/32	33/64	65/128
7,000	5,950	4,900	3,850	2,750	1,670	660	320

=== Prize money ===
The total prize money for this tournament was US$170,000. Distribution of prize money was in accordance with BWF regulations.

Event	Winner	Finals	Semi-finals	Quarter-finals	Last 16
Singles	$12,750	$6,460	$2,465	$1,020	$595
Doubles	$13,430	$6,460	$2,380	$1,232.50	$637.50

== Men's singles ==
=== Seeds ===
1. (China) Chen Long (withdrew)
2. (China) Shi Yuqi (semi-finals)
3. (Hong Kong) Ng Ka Long (champion)
4. (Japan) Kanta Tsuneyama (second round)
5. (India) Srikanth Kidambi (first round)
6. (Thailand) Kantaphon Wangcharoen (first round)
7. (Malaysia) Lee Zii Jia (second round)
8. (Chinese Taipei) Wang Tzu-wei (second round)

=== Finals ===
Semi-finals
(Thailand) Kunlavut Vitidsarn	18	13
(Japan) Kenta Nishimoto	21	21
3	(Hong Kong) Ng Ka Long	21	21
2	(China) Shi Yuqi	18	19

Final
(Japan) Kenta Nishimoto	21	13	12
3	(Hong Kong) Ng Ka Long	16	21	21

=== Top half ===
==== Section 1 ====
First Round
PFQ	(Brazil) Y Coelho	19	18
Q1	(Malaysia) Soong J V	21	21
Q3	(Russia) V Malkov	14	13
(Thailand) K Vitidsarn	21	21
6	(Thailand) K Wangcharoen	21	12	14
(Thailand) S Avihingsanon	18	21	21
(Thailand) K Phetpradab	14	21	21
(China) Huang YX	21	13	14

Second Round
Q1	(Malaysia) Soong J V	11	21	10
(Thailand) K Vitidsarn	21	18	21
(Thailand) S Avihingsanon	19	21	22
(Thailand) K Phetpradab	21	10	20

Quarter-finals
(Thailand) K Vitidsarn	21	21
(Thailand) S Avihingsanon	10	17

==== Section 2 ====
First Round
4	(Japan) K Tsuneyama	21	21
(Japan) K Naraoka	19	10
(Japan) K Nishimoto	17	21	21
Q2	(Malaysia) Cheam J W	21	17	14
8	(Chinese Taipei) Wang T-w	21	21
Q4	(Chinese Taipei) Lin Y-h	5	13
PFQ	(Vietnam) Nguyễn T M	16	18
(China) Zhao JP	21	21

Second Round
4	(Japan) K Tsuneyama	15	15
(Japan) K Nishimoto	21	21
8	(Chinese Taipei) Wang T-w	21	12	10
(China) Zhao JP	13	21	21

Quarter-finals
(Japan) K Nishimoto	21	22
(China) Zhao JP	11	20

=== Bottom half ===
==== Section 3 ====
First Round
(South Korea) Heo K-h	21	21
(Israel) M Zilberman	6	19
(India) S Verma	16	15
7	(Malaysia) Lee Z J	21	21
(South Korea) Son W-h	20	19
(China) Li SF	22	21
(China) Lin D	18	9
3	(Hong Kong) Ng K L	21	21

Second Round
(South Korea) Heo K-h	21	15	21
7	(Malaysia) Lee Z J	19	21	16
(China) Li SF	15	21
3	(Hong Kong) Ng K L	21	23

Quarter-finals
(South Korea) Heo K-h	16	21	11
3	(Hong Kong) Ng K L	21	13	21

==== Section 4 ====
First Round
(Japan) K Watanabe	17	21	21
(China) Sun FX	21	13	12
(Indonesia) S H Rhustavito	12	21	21
5	(India) S Kidambi	21	14	11
(Malaysia) Liew D	21	20	21
(India) Prannoy K	17	22	19
PFQ	(England) T Penty	10	18
2	(China) Shi YQ	21	21

Second Round
(Japan) K Watanabe	19	15
(Indonesia) S H Rhustavito	21	21
(Malaysia) Liew D	15	18
2	(China) Shi YQ	21	21

Quarter-finals
(Indonesia) S H Rhustavito	19	15
2	(China) Shi YQ	21	21

== Women's singles ==
=== Seeds ===
1. (Japan) Akane Yamaguchi (champion)
2. (Thailand) Ratchanok Intanon (quarter-finals)
3. (South Korea) An Se-young (final)
4. (Spain) Carolina Marín (semi-finals)
5. (India) Saina Nehwal (first round)
6. (South Korea) Sung Ji-hyun (first round)
7. (Denmark) Mia Blichfeldt (withdrew)
8. (Japan) Sayaka Takahashi (quarter-finals)

=== Finals ===
Semi-finals
1	(Japan) Akane Yamaguchi	14	23	21
4	(Spain) Carolina Marín	21	21	18
3	(South Korea) An Se-young	21	21
(Japan) Aya Ohori	17	14

Final
1	(Japan) Akane Yamaguchi	21	22
3	(South Korea) An Se-young	16	20

=== Top half ===
==== Section 1 ====
First Round
1	(Japan) A Yamaguchi	21	21
Q4	(Malaysia) Goh J W	12	8
Q1	(Belgium) L Tan	18	12
(Thailand) P Chaiwan	21	21
6	(South Korea) Sung J-h	24	24	18
(Thailand) B Ongbamrungphan	26	22	21
(Indonesia) G M Tunjung	21	21
PFQ	(Germany) Y Li	14	13

Second Round
1	(Japan) A Yamaguchi	21	21
(Thailand) P Chaiwan	19	10
(Thailand) B Ongbamrungphan	21	11	10
(Indonesia) G M Tunjung	14	21	21

Quarter-finals
1	(Japan) A Yamaguchi	25	21
(Indonesia) G M Tunjung	23	14

==== Section 2 ====
First Round
4	(Spain) C Marín	20	21	21
(South Korea) Kim G-e	22	10	5
(Thailand) P Chochuwong	21	21
(Indonesia) Fitriani	9	16
8	(Japan) S Takahashi	13	21	21
(China) Zhang YM	21	13	6
(China) Cai YY	21	21
(Singapore) Yeo J M	13	16

Second Round
4	(Spain) C Marín	21	21
(Thailand) P Chochuwong	11	9
8	(Japan) S Takahashi	16	21	21
(China) Cai YY	21	15	18

Quarter-finals
4	(Spain) C Marín	21	21
8	(Japan) S Takahashi	9	16

=== Bottom half ===
==== Section 3 ====
First Round
(Thailand) P Buranaprasertsuk	14	18
(Malaysia) S Cheah S Y	21	21
(Russia) E Kosetskaya	18	27	15
PFQ	(France) Qi XF	21	25	21
(Scotland) K Gilmour	22	21
PFQ	(Indonesia) R Hartawan	20	17
(China) Han Y	17	21	13
3	(South Korea) An S-y	21	14	21

Second Round
(Malaysia) S Cheah S Y	19	21	16
PFQ	(France) Qi XF	21	15	21
(Scotland) K Gilmour	14	14
3	(South Korea) An S-y	21	21

Quarter-finals
PFQ	(France) Qi XF	11	12
3	(South Korea) An S-y	21	21

==== Section 4 ====
First Round
(Japan) A Ohori	21	21
(China) Wang ZY	16	16
(Denmark) L Kjærsfeldt	21	17	21
5	(India) S Nehwal	13	21	15
Q2	(South Korea) Sim Y-j	15	18
PFQ	(Chinese Taipei) Pai Y-p	21	21
Q3	(Thailand) S Katethong	11	18
2	(Thailand) R Intanon	21	21

Second Round
(Japan) A Ohori	22	9	21
(Denmark) L Kjærsfeldt	20	21	13
PFQ	(Chinese Taipei) Pai Y-p	13	14
2	(Thailand) R Intanon	21	21

Quarter-finals
(Japan) A Ohori	16	21	21
2	(Thailand) R Intanon	21	17	11

== Men's doubles ==
=== Seeds ===
1. (Chinese Taipei) Lee Yang / Wang Chi-lin (second round)
2. (Malaysia) Aaron Chia / Soh Wooi Yik (first round)
3. (South Korea) Choi Sol-gyu / Seo Seung-jae (first round)
4. (Malaysia) Goh V Shem / Tan Wee Kiong (semi-finals)
5. (China) Han Chengkai / Zhou Haodong (first round)
6. (Denmark) Kim Astrup / Anders Skaarup Rasmussen (first round)
7. (Japan) Takuro Hoki / Yugo Kobayashi (quarter-finals)
8. (China) He Jiting / Tan Qiang (first round)

=== Finals ===
Semi-finals
(Chinese Taipei) Lee Jhe-huei (Chinese Taipei) Yang Po-hsuan	17	14
(Malaysia) Ong Yew Sin (Malaysia) Teo Ee Yi	21	21
4	(Malaysia) Goh V Shem (Malaysia) Tan Wee Kiong	15	11
(China) Huang Kaixiang (China) Liu Cheng	21	21

Final
(Malaysia) Ong Yew Sin (Malaysia) Teo Ee Yi	18	21	21
(China) Huang Kaixiang (China) Liu Cheng	21	17	17

=== Top half ===
==== Section 1 ====
First Round
1	(Chinese Taipei) Lee Y (Chinese Taipei) Wang C-l	21	21
(Denmark) M Bay-Smidt (Denmark) L Mølhede	9	16
(Netherlands) J Maas (Netherlands) R Tabeling	18	21	16
Q3	(Hong Kong) Chang T C (Hong Kong) Yeung M N	21	18	21
5	(China) Han CK (China) Zhou HD	17	18
(Malaysia) Goh S F (Malaysia) N Izzuddin	21	21
(Chinese Taipei) Lee J-h (Chinese Taipei) Yang P-hs	21	21
PFQ	(Japan) M Kaneko (Japan) Y Kubota	13	18

Second Round
1	(Chinese Taipei) Lee Y (Chinese Taipei) Wang C-l	4^{r}
Q3	(Hong Kong) Chang T C (Hong Kong) Yeung M N	5
(Malaysia) Goh S F (Malaysia) N Izzuddin	19	21	16
(Chinese Taipei) Lee J-h (Chinese Taipei) Yang P-hs	21	19	21

Quarter-finals
Q3	(Hong Kong) Chang T C (Hong Kong) Yeung M N	8	11
(Chinese Taipei) Lee J-h (Chinese Taipei) Yang P-hs	21	21

==== Section 2 ====
First Round
3	(South Korea) Choi S-g (South Korea) Seo S-j	11	18
(Malaysia) Ong Y S (Malaysia) Teo E Y	21	21
(China) Ou XY (China) Zhang N	21	15	21
(Malaysia) N M Azriyn A (Malaysia) Low J S	16	21	18
7	(Japan) T Hoki (Japan) Y Kobayashi	21	15	23
(South Korea) Na S-s (South Korea) Wang C	10	21	21
(Japan) K Matsui (Japan) Y Takeuchi	21	21
(United States) P Chew (United States) R Chew	19	12

Second Round
(Malaysia) Ong Y S (Malaysia) Teo E Y	19	23	21
(China) Ou XY (China) Zhang N	21	21	19
7	(Japan) T Hoki (Japan) Y Kobayashi	21	21
(Japan) K Matsui (Japan) Y Takeuchi	9	12

Quarter-finals
(Malaysia) Ong Y S (Malaysia) Teo E Y	21	21
7	(Japan) T Hoki (Japan) Y Kobayashi	15	17

=== Bottom half ===
==== Section 3 ====
First Round
Q4	(Indonesia) M S Fikri (Indonesia) B Maulana	21	21
(Canada) J Ho-shue (Canada) N Yakura	18	19
(England) M Ellis (England) C Langridge	21	22
8	(China) He JT (China) Tan Q	15	20
(Chinese Taipei) Liao M-c (Chinese Taipei) Su C-h	21	21
(Japan) H Okamura (Japan) M Onodera	17	10
(Germany) J R Jansen (Germany) P Käsbauer	13	14
4	(Malaysia) Goh V S (Malaysia) Tan W K	21	21

Second Round
Q4	(Indonesia) M S Fikri (Indonesia) B Maulana	16	19
(England) M Ellis (England) C Langridge	21	21
(Chinese Taipei) Liao M-c (Chinese Taipei) Su C-h	16	15
4	(Malaysia) Goh V S (Malaysia) Tan W K	21	21

Quarter-finals
(England) M Ellis (England) C Langridge	13	21	15
4	(Malaysia) Goh V S (Malaysia) Tan W K	21	16	21

==== Section 4 ====
First Round
Q1	(Indonesia) S K Gutama (Indonesia) M R P Isfahani	15	19
Q2	(Indonesia) L R Carnando (Indonesia) D Marthin	21	21
(Japan) A Koga (Japan) T Saito	21	15	21
6	(Denmark) K Astrup (Denmark) A S Rasmussen	13	21	16
(Chinese Taipei) Lu C-y (Chinese Taipei) Yang P-ha	16	21	21
(China) Di ZJ (China) Wang C	21	14	16
(China) Huang KX (China) Liu C	21	21
2	(Malaysia) A Chia (Malaysia) Soh W Y	16	12

Second Round
Q2	(Indonesia) L R Carnando (Indonesia) D Marthin	11	11
(Japan) A Koga (Japan) T Saito	21	21
(Chinese Taipei) Lu C-y (Chinese Taipei) Yang P-ha	21	16	19
(China) Huang KX (China) Liu C	10	21	21

Quarter-finals
(Japan) A Koga (Japan) T Saito	18	21	20
(China) Huang KX (China) Liu C	21	14	22

== Women's doubles ==
=== Seeds ===
1. (China) Chen Qingchen / Jia Yifan (champions)
2. (Japan) Misaki Matsutomo / Ayaka Takahashi (withdrew)
3. (South Korea) Kim So-yeong / Kong Hee-yong (semi-finals)
4. (South Korea) Lee So-hee / Shin Seung-chan (quarter-finals)
5. (China) Du Yue / Li Yinhui (quarter-finals)
6. (Indonesia) Greysia Polii / Apriyani Rahayu (withdrew)
7. (Thailand) Jongkolphan Kititharakul / Rawinda Prajongjai (second round)
8. (China) Li Wenmei / Zheng Yu (quarter-finals)

=== Finals ===
Semi-finals
1	(China) Chen Qingchen (China) Jia Yifan	21	19	21
3	(South Korea) Kim So-yeong (South Korea) Kong Hee-yong	13	21	16
(South Korea) Chang Ye-na (South Korea) Kim Hye-rin	16	19
(South Korea) Baek Ha-na (South Korea) Jung Kyung-eun	21	21

Final
1	(China) Chen Qingchen (China) Jia Yifan	17	21	21
(South Korea) Baek Ha-na (South Korea) Jung Kyung-eun	21	17	15

=== Top half ===
==== Section 1 ====
First Round
1	(China) Chen QC (China) Jia YF	21	21
(Bulgaria) G Stoeva (Bulgaria) S Stoeva	10	16
(Chinese Taipei) Chang C-h (Chinese Taipei) Yang C-t	14	14
(Japan) N Matsuyama (Japan) C Shida	21	21
5	(China) Du Y (China) Li YH	21	21
Q3	(Japan) C Hoshi (Japan) A Matsuda	15	10
Q4	(Thailand) B Aimsaard (Thailand) N Aimsaard	19	21	19
PFQ	(China) Huang J (China) Zhang SX	21	17	21

Second Round
1	(China) Chen QC (China) Jia YF	21	21
(Japan) N Matsuyama (Japan) C Shida	13	13
5	(China) Du Y (China) Li YH	21	21
PFQ	(China) Huang J (China) Zhang SX	13	13

Quarter-finals
1	(China) Chen QC (China) Jia YF	21	21
5	(China) Du Y (China) Li YH	16	16

==== Section 2 ====
First Round
3	(South Korea) Kim S-y (South Korea) Kong H-y	21	21
(Germany) L Efler (Germany) I Herttrich	11	11
(Netherlands) S Piek (Netherlands) C Seinen	18	10
(Chinese Taipei) Hsu Y-c (Chinese Taipei) Hu L-f	21	21
8	(China) Li WM (China) Zheng Y	21	21
(China) Liu XX (China) Xia YT	17	16
PFQ	(Chinese Taipei) Cheng C-y (Chinese Taipei) Lee C-c	17	16
(Thailand) P Supajirakul (Thailand) S Taerattanachai	21	21

Second Round
3	(South Korea) Kim S-y (South Korea) Kong H-y	21	21
(Chinese Taipei) Hsu Y-c (Chinese Taipei) Hu L-f	16	18
8	(China) Li WM (China) Zheng Y	21	21
(Thailand) P Supajirakul (Thailand) S Taerattanachai	16	17

Quarter-finals
3	(South Korea) Kim S-y (South Korea) Kong H-y	22	15	21
8	(China) Li WM (China) Zheng Y	20	21	14

=== Bottom half ===
==== Section 3 ====
First Round
(South Korea) Chang Y-n (South Korea) Kim H-r	21	21
PFQ	(China) Chen XF (China) Zhou CM	16	17
Q2	(Malaysia) A Cheong C Y (Malaysia) Lim C S	7	16
7	(Thailand) J Kititharakul (Thailand) R Prajongjai	21	21
(England) C Birch (England) L Smith	21	21
Q1	(Thailand) C Korepap (Thailand) K Sudjaipraparat	19	16
(Russia) E Bolotova (Russia) A Davletova	23	15	23
4	(South Korea) Lee S-h (South Korea) Shin S-c	21	21	25

Second Round
(South Korea) Chang Y-n (South Korea) Kim H-r	16	22	21
7	(Thailand) J Kititharakul (Thailand) R Prajongjai	21	20	19
(England) C Birch (England) L Smith	15	12
4	(South Korea) Lee S-h (South Korea) Shin S-c	21	21

Quarter-finals
(South Korea) Chang Y-n (South Korea) Kim H-r	21	21
4	(South Korea) Lee S-h (South Korea) Shin S-c	19	14

==== Section 4 ====
First Round
(Malaysia) V Hoo K M (Malaysia) Yap C W	21	20	22
(Malaysia) Chow M K (Malaysia) Lee M Y	14	22	20
PFQ	(Indonesia) A S Awanda (Indonesia) D D Haris	16	21	8
PFQ	(Hong Kong) Ng T Y (Hong Kong) Yuen S Y	21	13	21
(Australia) S Mapasa (Australia) G Somerville	6	19
(South Korea) Baek H-n (South Korea) Jung K-e	21	21
(Canada) R Honderich (Canada) K Tsai	21	21
PFQ	(Hong Kong) Ng W Y (Hong Kong) Yeung N T	16	14

Second Round
(Malaysia) V Hoo K M (Malaysia) Yap C W	21	21
PFQ	(Hong Kong) Ng T Y (Hong Kong) Yuen S Y	14	11
(South Korea) Baek H-n (South Korea) Jung K-e	21	19	21
(Canada) R Honderich (Canada) K Tsai	11	21	10

Quarter-finals
(Malaysia) V Hoo K M (Malaysia) Yap C W	12	15
(South Korea) Baek H-n (South Korea) Jung K-e	21	21

== Mixed doubles ==
=== Seeds ===
1. (Thailand) Dechapol Puavaranukroh / Sapsiree Taerattanachai (withdrew)
2. (South Korea) Seo Seung-jae / Chae Yoo-jung (withdrew)
3. (Malaysia) Goh Soon Huat / Shevon Jemie Lai (semi-finals)
4. (Indonesia) Hafiz Faizal / Gloria Emanuelle Widjaja (final)
5. (Hong Kong) Tang Chun Man / Tse Ying Suet (second round)
6. (England) Marcus Ellis / Lauren Smith (champions)
7. (China) He Jiting / Du Yue (first round)
8. (Malaysia) Tan Kian Meng / Lai Pei Jing (semi-finals)

=== Finals ===
Semi-finals
8	(Malaysia) Tan Kian Meng (Malaysia) Lai Pei Jing	19	23	17
4	(Indonesia) Hafiz Faizal (Indonesia) Gloria Emanuelle Widjaja	21	21	21
3	(Malaysia) Goh Soon Huat (Malaysia) Shevon Jemie Lai	21	19	22
6	(England) Marcus Ellis (England) Lauren Smith	19	21	24

Final
4	(Indonesia) Hafiz Faizal (Indonesia) Gloria Emanuelle Widjaja	16	21	16
6	(England) Marcus Ellis (England) Lauren Smith	21	13	21

=== Top half ===
==== Section 1 ====
First Round
PFQ	(Denmark) N Nøhr (Denmark) S Thygesen	21	16	21
(Indonesia) R Rivaldy (Indonesia) P H Mentari	12	21	12
Q1	(Japan) K Yamashita (Japan) N Shinoya	25	26	21
(Denmark) M Christiansen (Denmark) A Bøje	27	24	8
8	(Malaysia) Tan K M (Malaysia) Lai P J	21	21
Q3	(Denmark) M Bay-Smidt (Denmark) R Søby Hansen	19	17
Q4	(Indonesia) D Ferdinansyah (Indonesia) S Kani	21	21
(Russia) E Dremin (Russia) E Dimova	18	19

Second Round
PFQ	(Denmark) N Nøhr (Denmark) S Thygesen	24	23
Q1	(Japan) K Yamashita (Japan) N Shinoya	22	21
8	(Malaysia) Tan K M (Malaysia) Lai P J	21	21
Q4	(Indonesia) D Ferdinansyah (Indonesia) S Kani	15	13

Quarter-finals
PFQ	(Denmark) N Nøhr (Denmark) S Thygesen	16	9
8	(Malaysia) Tan K M (Malaysia) Lai P J	21	21

==== Section 2 ====
First Round
4	(Indonesia) H Faizal (Indonesia) G E Widjaja	6
(Thailand) N Phuangphuapet (Thailand) S Amitrapai	0^{r}
PFQ	(Australia) S Leung W H (Australia) G Somerville	10	9
(France) R Labar (France) A Tran	21	21
7	(China) He JT (China) Du Y	15	18
(China) Feng YZ (China) Zhang SX	21	21
(Indonesia) A Maulana (Indonesia) M C Bandaso	21	21
(Netherlands) R Tabeling (Netherlands) S Piek	17	15

Second Round
4	(Indonesia) H Faizal (Indonesia) G E Widjaja	21	24
(France) R Labar (France) A Tran	11	22
(China) Feng YZ (China) Zhang SX	20	21	13
(Indonesia) A Maulana (Indonesia) M C Bandaso	22	19	21

Quarter-finals
4	(Indonesia) H Faizal (Indonesia) G E Widjaja	21	21
(Indonesia) A Maulana (Indonesia) M C Bandaso	19	18

=== Bottom half ===
==== Section 3 ====
First Round
Q2	(Hong Kong) Yeung M N (Hong Kong) Ng T Y	21	21
(Republic of Ireland) S Magee (Republic of Ireland) C Magee	16	14
(Malaysia) Hoo P R (Malaysia) Cheah Y S	20	10
5	(Hong Kong) Tang C M (Hong Kong) Tse Y S	22	21
(Chinese Taipei) Lee J-h (Chinese Taipei) Hsu Y-c	15	21	17
(Germany) M Lamsfuß (Germany) I Herttrich	21	16	21
(Chinese Taipei) Yang P-hs (Chinese Taipei) Hu L-f	21	9	12
3	(Malaysia) Goh S H (Malaysia) S J Lai	17	21	21

Second Round
Q2	(Hong Kong) Yeung M N (Hong Kong) Ng T Y	13	21	21
5	(Hong Kong) Tang C M (Hong Kong) Tse Y S	21	18	19
(Germany) M Lamsfuß (Germany) I Herttrich	20	15
3	(Malaysia) Goh S H (Malaysia) S J Lai	22	21

Quarter-finals
Q2	(Hong Kong) Yeung M N (Hong Kong) Ng T Y	21	17
3	(Malaysia) Goh S H (Malaysia) S J Lai	23	21

==== Section 4 ====
First Round
(China) Ren XY (China) Zhou CM	21	21
(Hong Kong) Chang T C (Hong Kong) Ng W Y	17	12
(Russia) R Alimov (Russia) A Davletova	19	7
6	(England) M Ellis (England) L Smith	21	21
PFQ	(South Korea) Choi S-g (South Korea) Shin S-c	21	21
(Chinese Taipei) Lee Y (Chinese Taipei) Yang C-t	19	17
(Chinese Taipei) Wang C-l (Chinese Taipei) Cheng C-y	15	21	18
PFQ	(Thailand) S Jomkoh (Thailand) S Paewsampran	21	10	21

Second Round
(China) Ren XY (China) Zhou CM	17	20
6	(England) M Ellis (England) L Smith	21	22
PFQ	(South Korea) Choi S-g (South Korea) Shin S-c	13	21	21
PFQ	(Thailand) S Jomkoh (Thailand) S Paewsampran	21	15	16

Quarter-finals
6	(England) M Ellis (England) L Smith	14	21	21
PFQ	(South Korea) Choi S-g (South Korea) Shin S-c	21	10	7

Preceded by 2020 Indonesia Masters	BWF World Tour; 2020 BWF season	Succeeded by 2020 Spain Masters
