= 2017 BWF World Junior Championships – Girls' doubles =

The girls' doubles event of the 2017 BWF World Junior Championships was held on 16–22 October. The defending champions were Sayaka Hobara and Nami Matsuyama from Japan.

== Seeds ==
1. (South Korea) Kim Min-ji / Seong Ah-yeong (fourth round)
2. (South Korea) Baek Ha-na / Lee Yu-rim (champion)
3. (Indonesia) Agatha Imanuela / Siti Fadia Silva Ramadhanti (fourth round)
4. (Indonesia) Jauza Fadhila Sugiarto / Ribka Sugiarto (final)
5. (Turkey) Bengisu Ercetin / Nazlican Inci (quarterfinals)
6. (Malaysia) Pearly Tan Koong Le / Toh Ee Wei (fourth round)
7. (Thailand) Supisara Paewsampran / Kwanchanok Sudjaipraparat (fourth round)
8. (Chinese Taipei) Li Zi-qing / Teng Chun-hsun (quarterfinals)

9. (Indonesia) Serena Kani / Pitha Haningtyas Mentari (second round)
10. (China) Xia Yuting / Zhang Shuxian (semifinals)
11. (Poland) Wiktoria Dabczynska / Aleksandra Goszczynska (third round)
12. (Hungary) Vivien Sandorhazi / (Czech Republic) Tereza Svabikova (third round)
13. (Japan) Rin Iwanaga / Natsu Saito (third round)
14. (Bulgaria) Maria Delcheva / Hristomira Popovska (second round)
15. (Chinese Taipei) Cheng Yu-pei / Liang Chia-wei (fourth round)
16. (France) Vimala Heriau / Léonice Huet (fourth round)

Click on the seed number of a player to go to their draw section.

== Draw ==
=== Finals ===
Quarterfinals
(Denmark) Amalie Magelund (Denmark) Freja Ravn	21	11	9
10	(China) Xia Yuting (China) Zhang Shuxian	15	21	21
4	(Indonesia) Jauza Fadhila Sugiarto (Indonesia) Ribka Sugiarto	21	21
8	(Chinese Taipei) Li Zi-qing (Chinese Taipei) Teng Chun-hsun	15	19
5	(Turkey) Bengisu Ercetin (Turkey) Nazlican Inci	17	12
(China) Li Wenmei (China) Liu Xuanxuan	21	21
(Netherlands) Debora Jille (Netherlands) Alyssa Tirtosentono	6	7
2	(South Korea) Baek Ha-na (South Korea) Lee Yu-rim	21	21

Semifinals
10	(China) Xia Yuting (China) Zhang Shuxian	17	21	11
4	(Indonesia) Jauza Fadhila Sugiarto (Indonesia) Ribka Sugiarto	21	19	21
(China) Li Wenmei (China) Liu Xuanxuan	21	18	13
2	(South Korea) Baek Ha-na (South Korea) Lee Yu-rim	17	21	21

Finals
4	(Indonesia) Jauza Fadhila Sugiarto (Indonesia) Ribka Sugiarto	21	11	3
2	(South Korea) Baek Ha-na (South Korea) Lee Yu-rim	18	21	21

=== Top half ===
==== Section 1 ====
First round
(Russia) E Filippova (Russia) A Pustinskaia	21	22
(Sri Lanka) H N Ambalangodage (Sri Lanka) G A Mahesha	12	20

Second round
1	(South Korea) Kim M-j (South Korea) Seong A-y	16	21	21
(Germany) E Moszczynski (Germany) J Petrikowski	21	16	8
(Finland) H-L Lindberg (Finland) P Lindberg	11	9
(Slovakia) M Tarcalova (Slovakia) K Vargova	21	21
9	(Indonesia) S Kani (Indonesia) P H Mentari	19	21
(Denmark) A Magelund (Denmark) F Ravn	21	23
(Sweden) A Pillai (Sweden) T Sjoo	21	21	15
(Russia) E Filippova (Russia) A Pustinskaia	14	23	21

Third round
1	(South Korea) Kim M-j (South Korea) Seong A-y	21	21
(Slovakia) M Tarcalova (Slovakia) K Vargova	7	13
(Denmark) A Magelund (Denmark) F Ravn	21	21
(Russia) E Filippova (Russia) A Pustinskaia	8	17

Fourth round
1	(South Korea) Kim M-j (South Korea) Seong A-y	21	19	14
(Denmark) A Magelund (Denmark) F Ravn	13	21	21

==== Section 2 ====
First round
(New Zealand) S Fu (New Zealand) T Otene	21	24
(Australia) L Lim (Australia) S Lim	14	22

Second round
6	(Malaysia) P Tan (Malaysia) Toh E W	21	21
(Japan) Y Suizu (Japan) M Yamaguchi	18	14
(Singapore) N I Khan (Singapore) C Wong	21	21
(Norway) M Christensen (Norway) E Waland	7	7
10	(China) Xia YT (China) Zhang SX	21	21
(India) R Panda (India) M Umakant	10	11
(Denmark) L Christopersen (Denmark) M Skodstrup	21	21
(New Zealand) S Fu (New Zealand) T Otene	15	15

Third round
6	(Malaysia) P Tan (Malaysia) Toh E W	19	21	21
(Singapore) N I Khan (Singapore) C Wong	21	8	14
10	(China) Xia YT (China) Zhang SX	21	21
(Denmark) L Christopersen (Denmark) M Skodstrup	17	14

Fourth round
6	(Malaysia) P Tan (Malaysia) Toh E W	21	10	15
10	(China) Xia YT (China) Zhang SX	19	21	21

==== Section 3 ====
First round
(Hong Kong) Leung S L (Hong Kong) Wong C C	18	10
(United States) B Chi (United States) C Yuan	21	21

Second round
4	(Indonesia) J F Sugiarto (Indonesia) R Sugiarto	21	21
(Belgium) C Lassaux (Belgium) E Pondant	9	7
(Canada) K Ho-Shue (Canada) A Mocanu	21	21
(Latvia) U Berga (Latvia) L Lencevica	11	17
11	(Poland) W Dabczynska (Poland) A Goszczynska	w	/	o
(Philippines) S J Barredo (Philippines) A Geverjuan
(Thailand) T Kaweenuntavong (Thailand) S Silprakob	21	21
(United States) B Chi (United States) C Yuan	17	14

Third round
4	(Indonesia) J F Sugiarto (Indonesia) R Sugiarto	21	21
(Canada) K Ho-Shue (Canada) A Mocanu	9	11
11	(Poland) W Dabczynska (Poland) A Goszczynska	10	16
(Thailand) T Kaweenuntavong (Thailand) S Silprakob	21	21

Fourth round
4	(Indonesia) J F Sugiarto (Indonesia) R Sugiarto	21	21
(Thailand) T Kaweenuntavong (Thailand) S Silprakob	9	16

==== Section 4 ====
First round
(Armenia) G Mamajanyan (Armenia) M Stepanyan	3	6
(Japan) M Hayashi (Japan) N Yura	21	21
(India) M Bansod (India) D Choudhary	21	21
(El Salvador) K Lara (El Salvador) C Navas	5	6

Second round
8	(Chinese Taipei) Li Z-q (Chinese Taipei) Teng C-h	21	21
(South Africa) A Bestbier (South Africa) J Scholtz	9	3
(England) A Lado (England) H Warner	15	16
(Japan) M Hayashi (Japan) N Yura	21	21
16	(France) V Heriau (France) L Huet	21	27
(Thailand) S Chaikittiwat (Thailand) T Dumrongthamavoot	16	25
(Macau) Ao I K (Macau) Gong X X	16	7
(India) M Bansod (India) D Choudhary	21	21

Third round
8	(Chinese Taipei) Li Z-q (Chinese Taipei) Teng C-h	21	21
(Japan) M Hayashi (Japan) N Yura	19	16
16	(France) V Heriau (France) L Huet	21	21
(India) M Bansod (India) D Choudhary	14	13

Fourth round
8	(Chinese Taipei) Li Z-q (Chinese Taipei) Teng C-h	21	21
16	(France) V Heriau (France) L Huet	11	11

=== Bottom half ===
==== Section 5 ====
First round
(Algeria) H Bouksani (Algeria) L Mazri	13	21	11
(New Zealand) A Tagle (New Zealand) J Yu	21	17	21
(Hong Kong) Leung Y Y (Hong Kong) Yau M Y	21	21
(France) M Lambert (France) J Moinard	9	13

Second round
(New Zealand) A Tagle (New Zealand) J Yu	13	14
(Spain) P Lopez (Spain) L Santos	21	21
(Nepal) J Gurung (Nepal) R Maharjan	8	8
15	(Chinese Taipei) Cheng Y-p (Chinese Taipei) Liang C-w	21	21
(Hong Kong) Leung Y Y (Hong Kong) Yau M Y	21	21
(Poland) W Adamek (Poland) I Pajek	15	9
(Philippines) E M Canillo (Philippines) T M Opon	16	13
5	(Turkey) B Ercetin (Turkey) N Inci	21	21

Third round
(Spain) P Lopez (Spain) L Santos	13	17
15	(Chinese Taipei) Cheng Y-p (Chinese Taipei) Liang C-w	21	21
(Hong Kong) Leung Y Y (Hong Kong) Yau M Y	9	14
15	(Turkey) B Ercetin (Turkey) N Inci	21	21

Fourth round
15	(Chinese Taipei) Cheng Y-p (Chinese Taipei) Liang C-w	15	19
5	(Turkey) B Ercetin (Turkey) N Inci	21	21

==== Section 6 ====
First round
(Canada) C Choi (Canada) T Ng	13	10
(China) Li WM (China) Liu XX	21	21

Second round
(China) Li WM (China) Liu XX	21	21
(India) S Singhi (India) R Thaker	9	14
(Brazil) J Lima (Brazil) S Lima	14	15
12	(Hungary) V Sandorhazi (Czech Republic) T Svabikova	21	21
(Georgia (country)) M Khachaturyan (Georgia (country)) L Lanchava
(Australia) M Chan (Australia) V He	w	/	o
(Malaysia) Eng S J (Malaysia) Yap L	21	19	8
3	(Indonesia) A Imanuela (Indonesia) S F S Ramadhanti	19	21	21

Third round
(China) Li WM (China) Liu XX	21	21
12	(Hungary) V Sandorhazi (Czech Republic) T Svabikova	13	15
(Australia) M Chan (Australia) V He	7	5
3	(Indonesia) A Imanuela (Indonesia) S F S Ramadhanti	21	21

Fourth round
(China) Li WM (China) Liu XX	21	21
3	(Indonesia) A Imanuela (Indonesia) S F S Ramadhanti	17	17

==== Section 7 ====
First round
(Egypt) J Ashraf (Egypt) H H Mohamed	10	12
(United States) S Pandey (United States) R Yan	21	21
(Czech Republic) L Krpatova (Czech Republic) K Zuzakova	14	16
(Scotland) L Middleton (Scotland) C Torrence	21	21

Second round
(United States) S Pandey (United States) R Yan	6	10
(Netherlands) D Jille (Netherlands) A Tirtosentono	21	21
(England) A Holden (England) F Redfearn	16	13
13	(Japan) R Iwanaga (Japan) N Saito	21	21
(Scotland) L Middleton (Scotland) C Torrence	14	23	21
(Russia) A Semenova (Russia) A Shapovalova	21	21	16
(Germany) P Kick (Germany) M Wilson	13	9
7	(Thailand) S Paewsampran (Thailand) K Sudjaipraparat	21	21

Third round
(Netherlands) D Jille (Netherlands) A Tirtosentono	21	23
13	(Japan) R Iwanaga (Japan) N Saito	11	21
(Scotland) L Middleton (Scotland) C Torrence	10	15
7	(Thailand) S Paewsampran (Thailand) K Sudjaipraparat	21	21

Fourth round
(Netherlands) D Jille (Netherlands) A Tirtosentono	21	21
7	(Thailand) S Paewsampran (Thailand) K Sudjaipraparat	15	15

==== Section 8 ====
First round
(Denmark) A Boje (Denmark) C Busch	21	21
(Portugal) A F. Goncalves (Portugal) C M. Martins	5	13

Second round
(Denmark) A Boje (Denmark) C Busch	21	21
(Chinese Taipei) Luo J-w (Chinese Taipei) Wang Y-q	7	9
(China) Qiao SJ (China) Zhou M	21	21
14	(Bulgaria) M Delcheva (Bulgaria) H Popovska	11	15
(Ghana) G A Atipaka (Ghana) E Y Migbodzi	6	6
(Malaysia) Ng W W (Malaysia) Tan S J	21	21
(Singapore) B Lim (Singapore) J R Sito	8	13
2	(South Korea) Baek H-n (South Korea) Lee Y-r	21	21

Third round
(Denmark) A Boje (Denmark) C Busch	17	22	21
(China) Qiao SJ (China) Zhou M	21	20	18
(Malaysia) Ng W W (Malaysia) Tan S J	14	11
2	(South Korea) Baek H-n (South Korea) Lee Y-r	21	21

Fourth round
(Denmark) A Boje (Denmark) C Busch	13	13
2	(South Korea) Baek H-n (South Korea) Lee Y-r	21	21
