= Lee Yu-lim =

South Korean badminton player (born 2000)

Lee Yu-lim 이유림
Personal information
- Born: 27 January 2000 (age 26) Bucheon, Gyeonggi Province, South Korea
- Height: 1.61 m (5 ft 3 in)

Sport
- Country: South Korea
- Sport: Badminton
- Handedness: Right

Women's & mixed doubles
- Highest ranking: 11 (WD with Shin Seung-chan, 29 October 2024); 15 (WD with Baek Ha-na, 29 November 2022); 53 (XD with Kim Young-hyuk, 25 July 2023)
- Current ranking: 27 (WD with Kim Yu-jung, 10 November 2026)
- BWF profile
Medal record
Women's badminton
Representing South Korea
Uber Cup
Gold medal – first place	2022 Bangkok	Women's team
Bronze medal – third place	2018 Bangkok	Women's team
Asia Mixed Team Championships
Silver medal – second place	2023 Dubai	Mixed team
Asia Team Championships
Bronze medal – third place	2018 Alor Setar	Women's team
World Junior Championships
Gold medal – first place	2017 Yogyakarta	Girls' doubles
Bronze medal – third place	2017 Yogyakarta	Mixed team
Asian Junior Championships
Gold medal – first place	2017 Jakarta	Girls' doubles
Gold medal – first place	2017 Jakarta	Mixed team
Silver medal – second place	2016 Bangkok	Mixed doubles
Silver medal – second place	2016 Bangkok	Mixed team

Lee Yu-lim (Korean: 이유림; born 27 January 2000) is a South Korean badminton player who was educated at Janggok High School in Shiheung. She was a gold medallist in the girls' doubles event at the 2017 Asian Junior Championships and the World Junior Championships with Baek Ha-na. Among their key results in senior events, Lee and Baek reached the final at the 2017 Macau Open, but lost to Chinese pair Huang Yaqiong and Yu Xiaohan with the score 10–21, 17–21.

== Achievements ==
=== World Junior Championships ===
Girls' doubles
Year	Venue	Partner	Opponent	Score	Result
2017	GOR Among Rogo; Yogyakarta, Indonesia	(South Korea) Baek Ha-na	(Indonesia) Jauza Fadhila Sugiarto (Indonesia) Ribka Sugiarto	18–21, 21–11, 21–3	Gold

=== Asian Junior Championships ===
Girls' doubles
Year	Venue	Partner	Opponent	Score	Result
2017	Jaya Raya Sports Hall Training Center; Jakarta, Indonesia	(South Korea) Baek Ha-na	(China) Liu Xuanxuan (China) Xia Yuting	21–12, 21–19	Gold

Mixed doubles
Year	Venue	Partner	Opponent	Score	Result
2016	CPB Badminton Training Center; Bangkok, Thailand	(South Korea) Kim Won-ho	(China) He Jiting (China) Du Yue	12–21, 21–19, 19–21	Silver

=== BWF World Tour (2 titles, 6 runners-up) ===
The BWF World Tour, which was announced on 19 March 2017 and implemented in 2018, is a series of elite badminton tournaments sanctioned by the Badminton World Federation (BWF). The BWF World Tour is divided into levels of World Tour Finals, Super 1000, Super 750, Super 500, Super 300, and the BWF Tour Super 100.

Women's doubles
Year	Tournament	Level	Partner	Opponent	Score	Result
2018	Australian Open	Super 300	(South Korea) Baek Ha-na	(Japan) Ayako Sakuramoto (Japan) Yukiko Takahata	21–23, 18–21	(silver) Runner-up
2022	Korea Masters	Super 300	(South Korea) Baek Ha-na	(South Korea) Kim So-yeong (South Korea) Kong Hee-yong	17–21, 12–21	(silver) Runner-up
2022	Japan Open	Super 750	(South Korea) Baek Ha-na	(South Korea) Jeong Na-eun (South Korea) Kim Hye-jeong	21–23, 26–28	(silver) Runner-up
2023	Malaysia Open	Super 1000	(South Korea) Baek Ha-na	(China) Chen Qingchen (China) Jia Yifan	16–21, 10–21	(silver) Runner-up
2023	Taipei Open	Super 300	(South Korea) Shin Seung-chan	(Indonesia) Febriana Dwipuji Kusuma (Indonesia) Amalia Cahaya Pratiwi	18–21, 21–17, 21–17	(gold) Winner
2024	Malaysia Masters	Super 500	(South Korea) Shin Seung-chan	(Japan) Rin Iwanaga (Japan) Kie Nakanishi	21–17, 19–21, 18–21	(silver) Runner-up
2026	Vietnam Open	Super 100	(South Korea) Kim Yu-jung	(China) Liu Jiayue (China) Wang Zimeng	21–17, 10–21, 21–14	(gold) Winner
2026	Korea Open	Super 500	(South Korea) Kim Yu-jung	(Japan) Rui Hirokami (Japan) Sayaka Hobara	18–21, 18–21	(silver) Runner-up

=== BWF Grand Prix (1 runner-up) ===
The BWF Grand Prix had two levels, the Grand Prix and Grand Prix Gold. It was a series of badminton tournaments sanctioned by the Badminton World Federation (BWF) and played between 2007 and 2017.

Women's doubles
Year	Tournament	Partner	Opponent	Score	Result
2017	Macau Open	(South Korea) Baek Ha-na	(China) Huang Yaqiong (China) Yu Xiaohan	10–21, 17–21	(silver) Runner-up

BWF Grand Prix Gold tournament
BWF Grand Prix tournament

=== BWF International Challenge/Series (6 titles, 3 runners-up) ===
Women's doubles
Year	Tournament	Partner	Opponent	Score	Result
2018	Vietnam International	(South Korea) Baek Ha-na	(Malaysia) Vivian Hoo (Malaysia) Chow Mei Kuan	21–19, 17–21, 21–17	(gold) Winner
2023	Vietnam International	(South Korea) Shin Seung-chan	(Indonesia) Jesita Putri Miantoro (Indonesia) Febi Setianingrum	21–18, 21–10	(gold) Winner
2023	Osaka International	(South Korea) Shin Seung-chan	(Japan) Mizuki Otake (Japan) Miyu Takahashi	23–21, 21–13	(gold) Winner
2023	Northern Marianas Open	(South Korea) Shin Seung-chan	(Chinese Taipei) Hsu Ya-ching (Chinese Taipei) Lin Wan-ching	19–21, 21–18, 20–22	(silver) Runner-up
2025	Saipan International	(South Korea) An Yun-seong	(Japan) Kenta Matsukawa (Japan) Riko Kiyose	18–16, 15–12	(gold) Winner
2026	Singapore International	(South Korea) Kim Yu-jung	(South Korea) Jung Kyung-eun (South Korea) Kim So-yeong	22–24, 14–21	(silver) Runner-up
2026 (I)	Indonesia International	(South Korea) Kim Yu-jung	(Chinese Taipei) Tsai Ruo-lin (Chinese Taipei) Wang Yi-zhen	21–5, 21–14	(gold) Winner

Mixed doubles
Year	Tournament	Partner	Opponent	Score	Result
2018	Osaka International	(South Korea) Kim Won-ho	(Japan) Yunosuke Kubota (Japan) Chiharu Shida	21–17, 21–12	(gold) Winner
2023	Osaka International	(South Korea) Kim Young-hyuk	(South Korea) Wang Chan (South Korea) Shin Seung-chan	14–21, 21–14, 15–21	(silver) Runner-up

BWF International Challenge tournament
BWF International Series tournament
