= Badminton at the 2018 Asian Games =

- Venue: Istora Gelora Bung Karno
- Dates: 19–28 August
- Competitors: 224 from 19 nations

Badminton at the 2018 Asian Games was held at Istora Gelora Bung Karno, Jakarta, Indonesia from 19 to 28 August. The badminton programme in 2018 included men's and women's singles competitions; men's, women's and mixed doubles competitions along with men's and women's team events.

== Schedule ==
P	Preliminary rounds	¼	Quarterfinals	½	Semifinals	F	Final

Event↓/Date →	19th Sun	20th Mon	21st Tue	22nd Wed	23rd Thu	24th Fri	25th Sat	26th Sun	27th Mon	28th Tue
Men's singles					P	P	P	¼	½	F
Men's doubles					P		P	¼	½	F
Men's team	P	¼	½	F						
Women's singles					P	P	P	¼	½	F
Women's doubles					P	P	¼	½	F	
Women's team	P	¼	½	F						
Mixed doubles					P	P	¼	½	F	

== Medalists ==
Event	Gold	Silver	Bronze
Men's singles	Jonatan Christie; Indonesia	Chou Tien-chen; Chinese Taipei	Kenta Nishimoto; Japan
Men's singles	Jonatan Christie; Indonesia	Chou Tien-chen; Chinese Taipei	Anthony Sinisuka Ginting; Indonesia
Men's doubles	Indonesia; Marcus Fernaldi Gideon; Kevin Sanjaya Sukamuljo	Indonesia; Fajar Alfian; Muhammad Rian Ardianto	Chinese Taipei; Lee Jhe-huei; Lee Yang
Men's doubles	Indonesia; Marcus Fernaldi Gideon; Kevin Sanjaya Sukamuljo	Indonesia; Fajar Alfian; Muhammad Rian Ardianto	China; Li Junhui; Liu Yuchen
Men's team	China; Chen Long; Li Junhui; Lin Dan; Liu Cheng; Liu Yuchen; Qiao Bin; Shi Yuqi; Wang Yilü; Zhang Nan; Zheng Siwei	Indonesia; Tontowi Ahmad; Mohammad Ahsan; Fajar Alfian; Muhammad Rian Ardianto; Jonatan Christie; Marcus Fernaldi Gideon; Anthony Sinisuka Ginting; Ihsan Maulana Mustofa; Kevin Sanjaya Sukamuljo; Ricky Karanda Suwardi	Chinese Taipei; Chen Hung-ling; Chou Tien-chen; Hsu Jen-hao; Lee Jhe-huei; Lee Yang; Lu Ching-yao; Wang Chi-lin; Wang Tzu-wei; Yang Chih-chieh; Yang Po-han
Men's team	China; Chen Long; Li Junhui; Lin Dan; Liu Cheng; Liu Yuchen; Qiao Bin; Shi Yuqi; Wang Yilü; Zhang Nan; Zheng Siwei	Indonesia; Tontowi Ahmad; Mohammad Ahsan; Fajar Alfian; Muhammad Rian Ardianto; Jonatan Christie; Marcus Fernaldi Gideon; Anthony Sinisuka Ginting; Ihsan Maulana Mustofa; Kevin Sanjaya Sukamuljo; Ricky Karanda Suwardi	Japan; Takuro Hoki; Takuto Inoue; Takeshi Kamura; Yuki Kaneko; Kento Momota; Kenta Nishimoto; Keigo Sonoda; Riichi Takeshita; Kanta Tsuneyama; Yuta Watanabe
Women's singles	Tai Tzu-ying; Chinese Taipei	P. V. Sindhu; India	Saina Nehwal; India
Women's singles	Tai Tzu-ying; Chinese Taipei	P. V. Sindhu; India	Akane Yamaguchi; Japan
Women's doubles	China; Chen Qingchen; Jia Yifan	Japan; Misaki Matsutomo; Ayaka Takahashi	Japan; Yuki Fukushima; Sayaka Hirota
Women's doubles	China; Chen Qingchen; Jia Yifan	Japan; Misaki Matsutomo; Ayaka Takahashi	Indonesia; Greysia Polii; Apriyani Rahayu
Women's team	Japan; Yuki Fukushima; Arisa Higashino; Sayaka Hirota; Misaki Matsutomo; Aya Ohori; Nozomi Okuhara; Sayaka Sato; Ayaka Takahashi; Akane Yamaguchi; Koharu Yonemoto	China; Cai Yanyan; Chen Qingchen; Chen Yufei; Gao Fangjie; He Bingjiao; Huang Dongping; Huang Yaqiong; Jia Yifan; Tang Jinhua; Zheng Yu	Indonesia; Fitriani; Della Destiara Haris; Ruselli Hartawan; Ni Ketut Mahadewi Istarani; Liliyana Natsir; Greysia Polii; Rizki Amelia Pradipta; Apriyani Rahayu; Debby Susanto; Gregoria Mariska Tunjung
Women's team	Japan; Yuki Fukushima; Arisa Higashino; Sayaka Hirota; Misaki Matsutomo; Aya Ohori; Nozomi Okuhara; Sayaka Sato; Ayaka Takahashi; Akane Yamaguchi; Koharu Yonemoto	China; Cai Yanyan; Chen Qingchen; Chen Yufei; Gao Fangjie; He Bingjiao; Huang Dongping; Huang Yaqiong; Jia Yifan; Tang Jinhua; Zheng Yu	Thailand; Chayanit Chaladchalam; Pornpawee Chochuwong; Ratchanok Intanon; Nitchaon Jindapol; Jongkolphan Kititharakul; Phataimas Muenwong; Busanan Ongbamrungphan; Rawinda Prajongjai; Puttita Supajirakul; Sapsiree Taerattanachai
Mixed doubles	China; Zheng Siwei; Huang Yaqiong	Hong Kong; Tang Chun Man; Tse Ying Suet	Indonesia; Tontowi Ahmad; Liliyana Natsir
Mixed doubles	China; Zheng Siwei; Huang Yaqiong	Hong Kong; Tang Chun Man; Tse Ying Suet	China; Wang Yilü; Huang Dongping

== Medal table ==
Rank	Nation	Gold	Silver	Bronze	Total
1	China (CHN)	3	1	2	6
2	Indonesia (INA)	2	2	4	8
3	Japan (JPN)	1	1	4	6
4	Chinese Taipei (TPE)	1	1	2	4
5	India (IND)	0	1	1	2
6	Hong Kong (HKG)	0	1	0	1
7	Thailand (THA)	0	0	1	1
Totals (7 entries)		7	7	14	28

== Participating nations ==
A total of 224 athletes from 19 nations competed in badminton at the 2018 Asian Games:

- Afghanistan (2)
- China (20)
- Chinese Taipei (20)
- Hong Kong (20)
- India (20)
- Indonesia (20)
- Iran (2)
- Japan (20)
- Macau (4)
- Malaysia (14)
- Maldives (8)
- Mongolia (4)
- Nepal (8)
- Pakistan (8)
- Saudi Arabia (2)
- South Korea (20)
- Sri Lanka (6)
- Thailand (20)
- Vietnam (6)
