= Badminton at the 2022 Asian Games =

- Venue: Binjiang Gymnasium, Hangzhou, China
- Dates: 28 September 2023 – 7 October 2023

The badminton tournaments at the 2022 Asian Games was held at Binjiang Gymnasium in Hangzhou, China from 28 September to 7 October 2023. The badminton programme included men's and women's singles competitions; men's, women's, and mixed doubles competitions; and men's and women's team events.

== Schedule ==
P	Preliminary rounds	¼	Quarterfinals	½	Semifinals	F	Final

Event↓/Date →	28th Thu	29th Fri	30th Sat	1st Sun	2nd Mon	3rd Tue	4th Wed	5th Thu	6th Fri	7th Sat
Men's singles					P	P	P	¼	½	F
Men's doubles					P	P	¼		½	F
Men's team	P	¼	½	F						
Women's singles					P	P	¼		½	F
Women's doubles						P	P	¼	½	F
Women's team	P	¼	½	F						
Mixed doubles					P	P	¼		½	F

== Medalists ==
Event	Gold	Silver	Bronze
Men's singles	Li Shifeng; China	Shi Yuqi; China	Prannoy H. S. India
Men's singles	Li Shifeng; China	Shi Yuqi; China	Kodai Naraoka; Japan
Women's singles	An Se-young; South Korea	Chen Yufei; China	He Bingjiao; China
Women's singles	An Se-young; South Korea	Chen Yufei; China	Aya Ohori; Japan
Men's doubles	India; Satwiksairaj Rankireddy; Chirag Shetty	South Korea; Choi Sol-gyu; Kim Won-ho	Chinese Taipei; Lee Yang; Wang Chi-lin
Men's doubles	India; Satwiksairaj Rankireddy; Chirag Shetty	South Korea; Choi Sol-gyu; Kim Won-ho	Malaysia; Aaron Chia; Soh Wooi Yik
Women's doubles	China; Chen Qingchen; Jia Yifan	South Korea; Baek Ha-na; Lee So-hee	Japan; Yuki Fukushima; Sayaka Hirota
Women's doubles	China; Chen Qingchen; Jia Yifan	South Korea; Baek Ha-na; Lee So-hee	South Korea; Kim So-yeong; Kong Hee-yong
Mixed doubles	China; Zheng Siwei; Huang Yaqiong	Japan; Yuta Watanabe; Arisa Higashino	China; Feng Yanzhe; Huang Dongping
Mixed doubles	China; Zheng Siwei; Huang Yaqiong	Japan; Yuta Watanabe; Arisa Higashino	South Korea; Seo Seung-jae; Chae Yoo-jung
Men's team	China; Shi Yuqi; Li Shifeng; Lu Guangzu; Weng Hongyang; Liang Weikeng; Wang Chang; Liu Yuchen; Ou Xuanyi; Feng Yanzhe; Zheng Siwei	India; Prannoy H. S. Lakshya Sen; Srikanth Kidambi; Mithun Manjunath; Satwiksairaj Rankireddy; Chirag Shetty; Arjun M. R. Dhruv Kapila; Rohan Kapoor; Sai Pratheek K.	Japan; Kyohei Yamashita; Yuta Watanabe; Kodai Naraoka; Akira Koga; Takuro Hoki; Taichi Saito; Kenta Nishimoto; Yugo Kobayashi; Kanta Tsuneyama; Koki Watanabe
Men's team	China; Shi Yuqi; Li Shifeng; Lu Guangzu; Weng Hongyang; Liang Weikeng; Wang Chang; Liu Yuchen; Ou Xuanyi; Feng Yanzhe; Zheng Siwei	India; Prannoy H. S. Lakshya Sen; Srikanth Kidambi; Mithun Manjunath; Satwiksairaj Rankireddy; Chirag Shetty; Arjun M. R. Dhruv Kapila; Rohan Kapoor; Sai Pratheek K.	South Korea; Seo Seung-jae; Lee Yun-gyu; Kim Won-ho; Kim Young-hyuk; Kang Min-hyuk; Jeon Hyeok-jin; Jin Yong; Cho Geon-yeop; Choi Sol-gyu; Na Sung-seung
Women's team	South Korea; An Se-young; Kim Ga-eun; Kim Ga-ram; Baek Ha-na; Lee So-hee; Kim So-yeong; Kong Hee-yong; Jeong Na-eun; Kim Hye-jeong; Chae Yoo-jung	China; Chen Yufei; He Bingjiao; Han Yue; Wang Zhiyi; Chen Qingchen; Jia Yifan; Zhang Shuxian; Zheng Yu; Huang Dongping; Huang Yaqiong	Japan; Akane Yamaguchi; Aya Ohori; Saena Kawakami; Natsuki Nidaira; Nami Matsuyama; Chiharu Shida; Yuki Fukushima; Sayaka Hirota; Arisa Higashino; Naru Shinoya
Women's team	South Korea; An Se-young; Kim Ga-eun; Kim Ga-ram; Baek Ha-na; Lee So-hee; Kim So-yeong; Kong Hee-yong; Jeong Na-eun; Kim Hye-jeong; Chae Yoo-jung	China; Chen Yufei; He Bingjiao; Han Yue; Wang Zhiyi; Chen Qingchen; Jia Yifan; Zhang Shuxian; Zheng Yu; Huang Dongping; Huang Yaqiong	Thailand; Supissara Paewsampran; Sapsiree Taerattanachai; Benyapa Aimsaard; Nuntakarn Aimsaard; Rawinda Prajongjai; Jongkolphan Kititharakul; Supanida Katethong; Busanan Ongbamrungphan; Pornpawee Chochuwong; ~~Ratchanok Intanon~~

== Medal table ==
* Host nation (China)

Rank	Nation	Gold	Silver	Bronze	Total
1	China (CHN)*	4	3	2	9
2	South Korea (KOR)	2	2	3	7
3	India (IND)	1	1	1	3
4	Japan (JPN)	0	1	5	6
5	Chinese Taipei (TPE)	0	0	1	1
5	Malaysia (MAS)	0	0	1	1
5	Thailand (THA)	0	0	1	1
Totals (7 entries)		7	7	14	28

== Participating nations ==
246 athletes from 23 nations competed.

- Bhutan (2)
- Cambodia (2)
- China (20)
- Hong Kong (20)
- India (19)
- Indonesia (20)
- Iran (2)
- Japan (20)
- Jordan (1)
- Kazakhstan (2)
- Macau (6)
- Malaysia (18)
- Maldives (8)
- Mongolia (13)
- Nepal (8)
- Pakistan (4)
- Timor-Leste (3)
- Singapore (13)
- South Korea (20)
- Sri Lanka (1)
- Chinese Taipei (20)
- Thailand (20)
- Vietnam (4)
