= 2019 BWF World Championships – Women's doubles =

Women's doubles at the 2019 BWF World Championships
- Venue: St. Jakobshalle
- Location: Basel, Switzerland
- Dates: 19–25 August

Medalists
gold medal	Mayu Matsumoto; Wakana Nagahara	Japan
silver medal	Yuki Fukushima; Sayaka Hirota	Japan
bronze medal	Greysia Polii; Apriyani Rahayu	Indonesia
bronze medal	Du Yue; Li Yinhui	China

The women's doubles tournament of the 2019 BWF World Championships (World Badminton Championships) takes place from 19 to 25 August.

== Seeds ==
The seeding list is based on the World Rankings from 30 July 2019.

1. (Japan) Mayu Matsumoto / Wakana Nagahara (champions)
2. (Japan) Yuki Fukushima / Sayaka Hirota (final)
3. (Japan) Misaki Matsutomo / Ayaka Takahashi (quarterfinals)
4. (China) Chen Qingchen / Jia Yifan (quarterfinals)
5. (Indonesia) Greysia Polii / Apriyani Rahayu (semifinals)
6. (South Korea) Lee So-hee / Shin Seung-chan (quarterfinals)
7. (China) Du Yue / Li Yinhui (semifinals)
8. (Japan) Shiho Tanaka / Koharu Yonemoto (quarterfinals)

9. (South Korea) Kim So-yeong / Kong Hee-yong (third round)
10. (Bulgaria) Gabriela Stoeva / Stefani Stoeva (third round)
11. (Thailand) Jongkolphan Kititharakul / Rawinda Prajongjai (third round)
12. (China) Li Wenmei / Zheng Yu (third round)
13. (Malaysia) Chow Mei Kuan / Lee Meng Yean (third round)
14. (Indonesia) Della Destiara Haris / Rizki Amelia Pradipta (third round)
15. (Malaysia) Vivian Hoo Kah Mun / Yap Cheng Wen (third round)
16. (Denmark) Maiken Fruergaard / Sara Thygesen (third round)

Click on the seed number of a player to go to their draw section.

== Draw ==
=== Finals ===
Semifinals
1	(Japan) Mayu Matsumoto (Japan) Wakana Nagahara	21	21
5	(Indonesia) Greysia Polii (Indonesia) Apriyani Rahayu	12	19
7	(China) Du Yue (China) Li Yinhui	11	17
2	(Japan) Yuki Fukushima (Japan) Sayaka Hirota	21	21

Final
1	(Japan) Mayu Matsumoto (Japan) Wakana Nagahara	21	20	23
2	(Japan) Yuki Fukushima (Japan) Sayaka Hirota	11	22	21

=== Top half ===
==== Section 1 ====
First Round
(Netherlands) S Piek (Netherlands) C Seinen	21	21
(Hong Kong) Ng W Y (Hong Kong) Yeung N T	11	16
(United States) E Kan (United States) I Zhong	5	14
(France) É Lefel (France) A Tran	21	21
(India) M Jakkampudi (India) P S. Ram	21	21
(Guatemala) D C Soto (Guatemala) N Sotomayor	10	18
(Czech Republic) A Bášová (Czech Republic) M Fuchsová	14	21	8
(Sweden) E Karlsson (Sweden) J Magnusson	21	18	21

Second Round
1	(Japan) M Matsumoto (Japan) W Nagahara	21	21
(Netherlands) S Piek (Netherlands) C Seinen	9	6
16	(Denmark) M Fruergaard (Denmark) S Thygesen	21	21
(France) É Lefel (France) A Tran	12	18
8	(Japan) S Tanaka (Japan) K Yonemoto	21	21
(India) M Jakkampudi (India) P S. Ram	8	18
11	(Thailand) J Kititharakul (Thailand) R Prajongjai	21	21
(Sweden) E Karlsson (Sweden) J Magnusson	12	14

Third Round
1	(Japan) M Matsumoto (Japan) W Nagahara	21	21
16	(Denmark) M Fruergaard (Denmark) S Thygesen	19	19
8	(Japan) S Tanaka (Japan) K Yonemoto	21	21
11	(Thailand) J Kititharakul (Thailand) R Prajongjai	18	18

Quarterfinals
1	(Japan) M Matsumoto (Japan) W Nagahara	22	3
8	(Japan) S Tanaka (Japan) K Yonemoto	20	3^{r}

==== Section 2 ====
First Round
(Indonesia) Y Barkah (Indonesia) J F Sugiarto	14	15
(Thailand) P Supajirakul (Thailand) S Taerattanachai	21	21
(China) Dong WJ (China) Feng XY	21	21
(Peru) D Macías (Peru) D Nishimura	14	9
(Russia) A Akchurina (Russia) O Morozova	21	21
(Turkey) B Erçetin (Turkey) N İnci	17	11
(France) D Delrue (France) L Palermo	21	21
(United States) A Lee (United States) S Lee	5	6

Second Round
4	(China) Chen QC (China) Jia YF	18	21	21
(Thailand) P Supajirakul (Thailand) S Taerattanachai	21	15	12
9	(South Korea) Kim S-y (South Korea) Kong H-y	21	21
(China) Dong WJ (China) Feng XY	10	18
5	(Indonesia) G Polii (Indonesia) A Rahayu	21	21
(Russia) A Akchurina (Russia) O Morozova	13	12
10	(Bulgaria) G Stoeva (Bulgaria) S Stoeva	21	18	21
(France) D Delrue (France) L Palermo	13	21	10

Third Round
4	(China) Chen QC (China) Jia YF	19	21	21
9	(South Korea) Kim S-y (South Korea) Kong H-y	21	17	16
5	(Indonesia) G Polii (Indonesia) A Rahayu	21	21
10	(Bulgaria) G Stoeva (Bulgaria) S Stoeva	19	16

Quarterfinals
4	(China) Chen QC (China) Jia YF	23	21
5	(Indonesia) G Polii (Indonesia) A Rahayu	25	23

=== Bottom half ===
==== Section 3 ====
First Round
(Thailand) C Chaladchalam (Thailand) P Muenwong	21	21
(Switzerland) N Fankhauser (Netherlands) I Tabeling	18	15
(India) A Ponnappa (India) N. S Reddy	w	/	o
(Chinese Taipei) Chang C-h (Chinese Taipei) Yang C-t
(India) P Dandu (India) S Santosh	15	14
(Chinese Taipei) Hsu Y-c (Chinese Taipei) Hu L-f	21	21
(Canada) R Honderich (Canada) K Tsai	12	16
(Australia) S Mapasa (Australia) G Somerville	21	21

Second Round
(Thailand) C Chaladchalam (Thailand) P Muenwong	18	16
15	(Malaysia) V Hoo K M (Malaysia) Yap C W	21	21
(India) A Ponnappa (India) N. S Reddy	20	16
7	(China) Du Y (China) Li YH	22	21
(Chinese Taipei) Hsu Y-c (Chinese Taipei) Hu L-f	15	21	11
13	(Malaysia) Chow M K (Malaysia) Lee M Y	21	13	21
(Australia) S Mapasa (Australia) G Somerville	11	12
3	(Japan) M Matsutomo (Japan) A Takahashi	21	21

Third Round
15	(Malaysia) V Hoo K M (Malaysia) Yap C W	15	21	8
7	(China) Du Y (China) Li YH	21	11	21
13	(Malaysia) Chow M K (Malaysia) Lee M Y	12	13
3	(Japan) M Matsutomo (Japan) A Takahashi	21	21

Quarterfinals
7	(China) Du Y (China) Li YH	23	21	25
3	(Japan) M Matsutomo (Japan) A Takahashi	25	18	23

==== Section 4 ====
First Round
(Ukraine) M Ilyinskaya (Ukraine) Y Zharka	w	/	o
(Germany) J Goliszewski (Germany) L Käpplein
(Denmark) A Magelund (Denmark) F Ravn	13	21	21
(Hong Kong) Ng T Y (Hong Kong) Yuen S Y	21	15	18
(Estonia) K-K Marran (Estonia) H Rüütel	18	13
(Germany) L Efler (Germany) I Herttrich	21	21
(England) C Birch (England) L Smith	17	15
(Russia) E Bolotova (Russia) A Davletova	21	21

Second Round
(Ukraine) M Ilyinskaya (Ukraine) Y Zharka	9	11
14	(Indonesia) D D Haris (Indonesia) R A Pradipta	21	21
(Denmark) A Magelund (Denmark) F Ravn	19	18
6	(South Korea) Lee S-h (South Korea) Shin S-c	21	21
(Germany) L Efler (Germany) I Herttrich	16	9
12	(China) Li WM (China) Zheng Y	21	21
(Russia) E Bolotova (Russia) A Davletova	7	13
2	(Japan) Y Fukushima (Japan) S Hirota	21	21

Third Round
14	(Indonesia) D D Haris (Indonesia) R A Pradipta	17	18
6	(South Korea) Lee S-h (South Korea) Shin S-c	21	21
12	(China) Li WM (China) Zheng Y	20	16
2	(Japan) Y Fukushima (Japan) S Hirota	22	21

Quarterfinals
6	(South Korea) Lee S-h (South Korea) Shin S-c	11	21	18
2	(Japan) Y Fukushima (Japan) S Hirota	21	11	21
