= 2017 BWF World Championships – Women's doubles =

Women's doubles at the BWF World Championships
- Venue: Emirates Arena
- Location: Glasgow, Scotland
- Dates: 21–27 August

Medalists
gold medal	Chen Qingchen; Jia Yifan	China
silver medal	Yuki Fukushima; Sayaka Hirota	Japan
bronze medal	Misaki Matsutomo; Ayaka Takahashi	Japan
bronze medal	Kamilla Rytter Juhl; Christinna Pedersen	Denmark

The women's doubles tournament of the 2017 BWF World Championships (World Badminton Championships) took place from 21 to 27 August.

== Seeds ==
1. (Japan) Misaki Matsutomo / Ayaka Takahashi (semifinals)
2. (Denmark) Kamilla Rytter Juhl / Christinna Pedersen (semifinals)
3. (South Korea) Chang Ye-na / Lee So-hee (quarterfinals)
4. (China) Chen Qingchen / Jia Yifan (champion)
5. (South Korea) Jung Kyung-eun / Shin Seung-chan (quarterfinals)
6. (China) Huang Dongping / Li Yinhui (third round)
7. (Japan) Shiho Tanaka / Koharu Yonemoto (quarterfinals)
8. (China) Luo Ying / Luo Yu (third round)
9. (Japan) Yuki Fukushima / Sayaka Hirota (final)
10. (Japan) Naoko Fukuman / Kurumi Yonao (third round)
11. (Bulgaria) Gabriela Stoeva / Stefani Stoeva (third round)
12. (South Korea) Chae Yoo-jung / Kim So-yeong (third round)
13. (South Korea) Kim Hye-rin / Yoo Hae-won (third round)
14. (China) Bao Yixin / Yu Xiaohan (quarterfinals)
15. (Denmark) Maiken Fruergaard / Sara Thygesen (third round)
16. (Russia) Anastasia Chervyakova / Olga Morozova (third round)

Click on the seed number of a player to go to their draw section.

== Draw ==
=== Finals ===
Semifinals
1	(Japan) Misaki Matsutomo (Japan) Ayaka Takahashi	17	15
4	(China) Chen Qingchen (China) Jia Yifan	21	21
9	(Japan) Yuki Fukushima (Japan) Sayaka Hirota	21	19	21
2	(Denmark) Kamilla Rytter Juhl (Denmark) Christinna Pedersen	17	21	14

Final
4	(China) Chen Qingchen (China) Jia Yifan	21	17	21
9	(Japan) Yuki Fukushima (Japan) Sayaka Hirota	18	21	15

=== Section 1 ===
First Round
(United States) E Lee (United States) P L Obanana	12	6
(Chinese Taipei) Chang C-h (Chinese Taipei) Yang C-t	21	21
(Chinese Taipei) Cheng Y-c (Chinese Taipei) Hu L-f	21	21
(Italy) S Garino (Italy) L Iversen	8	11
(Hong Kong) Poon L Y (Hong Kong) Tse Y S	21	21
(France) D Delrue (France) L Palermo	14	9
(India) S Santosh (India) A S Sunil	21	21
(Ukraine) N Voytsekh (Ukraine) Y Zharka	15	18

Second Round
1	(Japan) M Matsutomo (Japan) A Takahashi	21	21
(Chinese Taipei) Chang C-h (Chinese Taipei) Yang C-t	10	5
10	(Japan) N Fukuman (Japan) K Yanao	21	21
(Chinese Taipei) Cheng Y-c (Chinese Taipei) Hu L-f	7	17
8	(China) Luo Ying (China) Luo Yu	21	21
(Hong Kong) Poon L Y (Hong Kong) Tse Y S	14	19
14	(China) Bao YX (China) Yu XH	21	21
(India) S Santosh (India) A S Sunil	14	15

Third Round
1	(Japan) M Matsutomo (Japan) A Takahashi	18	21	21
10	(Japan) N Fukuman (Japan) K Yanao	21	15	19
8	(China) Luo Ying (China) Luo Yu	17	21	15
14	(China) Bao YX (China) Yu XH	21	10	21

Quarterfinals
1	(Japan) M Matsutomo (Japan) A Takahashi	21	25	21
14	(China) Bao YX (China) Yu XH	13	27	19

=== Section 2 ===
First Round
(Chinese Taipei) Chiang K-h (Chinese Taipei) Hung S-h	13	21	21
(Denmark) J F-Ipsen (Denmark) R Søby	21	18	19
(Estonia) K Kuuba (Estonia) H Rüütel	21	21
(Germany) J Goliszewski (Germany) L Käpplein	15	15
(England) L Smith (England) S Walker	21	26
(Germany) L Kaminski (Germany) H Pohl	10	24
(Scotland) R Findlay (Scotland) C Pringle	12	10
(France) É Lefel (France) A Tran	21	21

Second Round
4	(China) Chen QC (China) Jia YF	21	21
(Chinese Taipei) Chiang K-h (Chinese Taipei) Hung S-h	16	17
16	(Russia) A Chervyakova (Russia) O Morozova	21	21
(Estonia) K Kuuba (Estonia) H Rüütel	18	9
5	(South Korea) Jung K-e (South Korea) Shin S-c	21	21
(England) L Smith (England) S Walker	10	14
15	(Denmark) M Fruergaard (Denmark) S Thygesen	19	21	21
(France) É Lefel (France) A Tran	21	14	11

Third Round
4	(China) Chen QC (China) Jia YF	21	21
16	(Russia) A Chervyakova (Russia) O Morozova	13	17
5	(South Korea) Jung K-e (South Korea) Shin S-c	21	22
15	(Denmark) M Fruergaard (Denmark) S Thygesen	18	20

Quarterfinals
4	(China) Chen QC (China) Jia YF	21	21
5	(South Korea) Jung K-e (South Korea) Shin S-c	17	14

=== Section 3 ===
First Round
(India) M Jakkampudi (India) P S Ram	21	16	8
(Netherlands) E Muskens (Netherlands) S Piek	13	21	21
(Egypt) D Hany (Egypt) H Hosny	3	6
(Germany) I Herttrich (Germany) C Nelte	21	21
(Hong Kong) Ng T Y (Hong Kong) Yeung N T	21	21
(Finland) J Nyström (Finland) S Pekkola	11	17
(Scotland) J MacPherson (Scotland) E O'Donnell	19	19
(Switzerland) N Fankhauser (Malaysia) S Saniru	21	21

Second Round
(Netherlands) E Muskens (Netherlands) S Piek	12	4^{r}
9	(Japan) Y Fukushima (Japan) S Hirota	21	11
(Germany) I Herttrich (Germany) C Nelte	7	19
6	(China) Huang DP (China) Li YH	21	21
(Hong Kong) Ng T Y (Hong Kong) Yeung N T	13	14
12	(South Korea) Chae Y-j (South Korea) Kim S-y	21	21
(Switzerland) N Fankhauser (Malaysia) S Saniru	6	14
3	(South Korea) Chang Y-n (South Korea) Lee S-h	21	21

Third Round
9	(Japan) Y Fukushima (Japan) S Hirota	21	21
6	(China) Huang DP (China) Li YH	3	14
12	(South Korea) Chae Y-j (South Korea) Kim S-y	21	12	20
3	(South Korea) Chang Y-n (South Korea) Lee S-h	18	21	22

Quarterfinals
9	(Japan) Y Fukushima (Japan) S Hirota	21	25	21
3	(South Korea) Chang Y-n (South Korea) Lee S-h	14	27	19

=== Section 4 ===
First Round
(Australia) S Mapasa (Australia) G Somerville
(Czech Republic) T Švábíková (Czech Republic) K Tomalová	w	/	o
(England) J Moore (England) V Williams	13	21	18
(France) L Baumann (France) A Fontaine	21	19	21
(Sweden) C Nistad (Sweden) E Wengberg	8	21	20
(Chinese Taipei) Lin X-m (Chinese Taipei) Wu F-c	21	16	22
(Indonesia) R Amelia (Malaysia) A Cheong	15	13
(India) A Ponnappa (India) N. S Reddy	21	21

Second Round
(Czech Republic) T Švábíková (Czech Republic) K Tomalová	7	11
11	(Bulgaria) G Stoeva (Bulgaria) S Stoeva	21	21
(France) L Baumann (France) A Fontaine	9	8
7	(Japan) S Tanaka (Japan) K Yonemoto	21	21
(Chinese Taipei) Lin X-m (Chinese Taipei) Wu F-c	14	12
13	(South Korea) Kim H-r (South Korea) Yoo H-w	21	21
(India) A Ponnappa (India) N. S Reddy	22	21	15
2	(Denmark) K Rytter Juhl (Denmark) C Pedersen	24	17	21

Third Round
11	(Bulgaria) G Stoeva (Bulgaria) S Stoeva	12	21	19
7	(Japan) S Tanaka (Japan) K Yonemoto	21	15	21
13	(South Korea) Kim H-r (South Korea) Yoo H-w	20	19
2	(Denmark) K Rytter Juhl (Denmark) C Pedersen	22	21

Quarterfinals
7	(Japan) S Tanaka (Japan) K Yonemoto	5	21	25
2	(Denmark) K Rytter Juhl (Denmark) C Pedersen	21	18	27
