= Jia Yifan =

Chinese badminton player (born 1997)

Jia Yifan 贾一凡
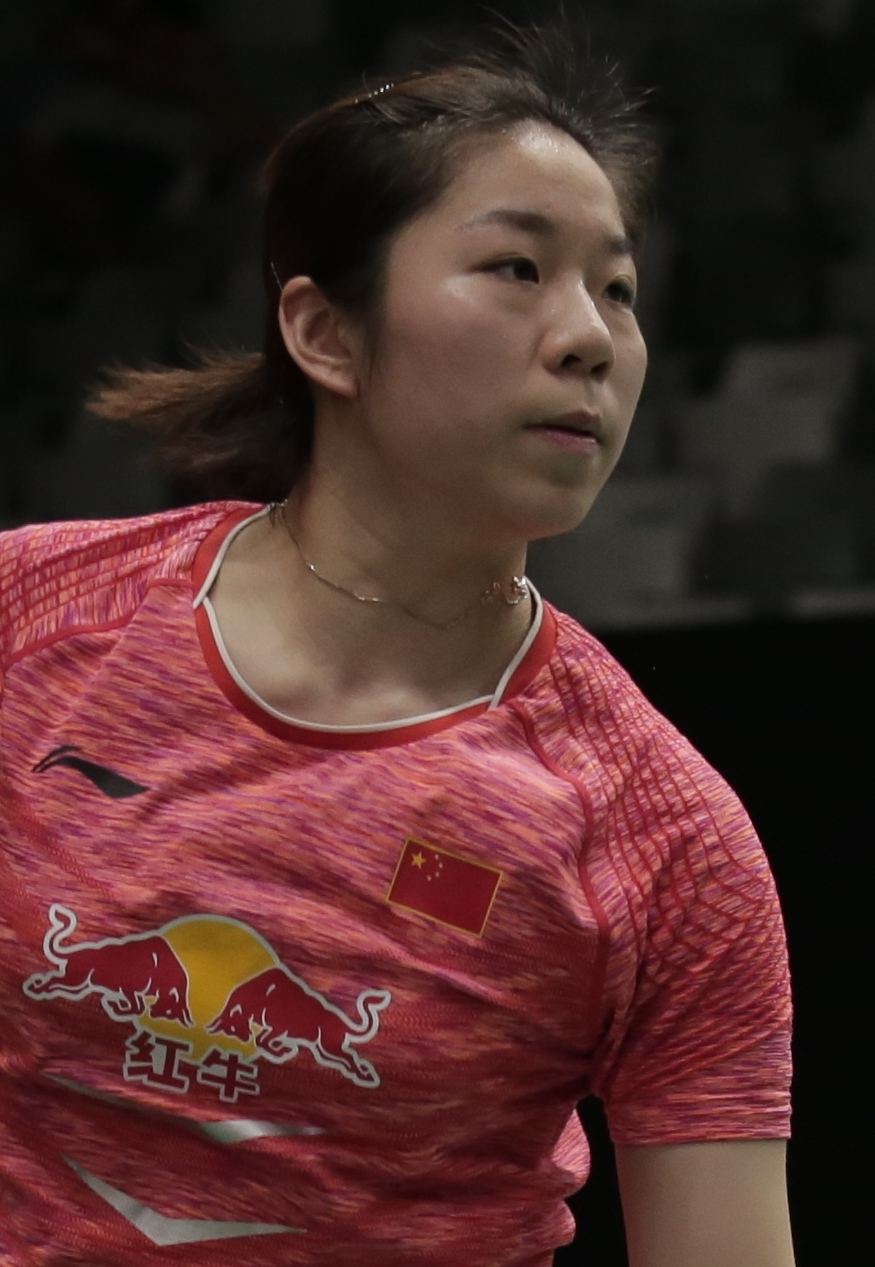
- Jia at the 2018 Indonesia Masters

Personal information
- Born: 29 June 1997 (age 29) Tianjin, China
- Height: 1.70 m (5 ft 7 in)

Sport
- Country: China
- Sport: Badminton
- Handedness: Left

Women's & mixed doubles
- Highest ranking: 1 (WD with Chen Qingchen, 2 November 2017); 2 (WD with Zhang Shuxian, 16 June 2026); 97 (XD with Zhou Haodong, 1 September 2016)
- BWF profile
Medal record
Women's badminton
Representing China
Olympic Games
| Gold medal – first place | 2024 Paris | Women's doubles |
| Silver medal – second place | 2020 Tokyo | Women's doubles |
World Championships
| Gold medal – first place | 2017 Glasgow | Women's doubles |
| Gold medal – first place | 2021 Huelva | Women's doubles |
| Gold medal – first place | 2022 Tokyo | Women's doubles |
| Gold medal – first place | 2023 Copenhagen | Women's doubles |
Sudirman Cup
| Gold medal – first place | 2019 Nanning | Mixed team |
| Gold medal – first place | 2021 Vantaa | Mixed team |
| Gold medal – first place | 2023 Suzhou | Mixed team |
| Gold medal – first place | 2025 Xiamen | Mixed team |
| Silver medal – second place | 2017 Gold Coast | Mixed team |
Uber Cup
| Gold medal – first place | 2020 Aarhus | Women's team |
| Gold medal – first place | 2024 Chengdu | Women's team |
| Silver medal – second place | 2022 Bangkok | Women's team |
| Silver medal – second place | 2026 Horsens | Women's team |
| Bronze medal – third place | 2018 Bangkok | Women's team |
Asian Games
| Gold medal – first place | 2018 Jakarta–Palembang | Women's doubles |
| Gold medal – first place | 2022 Hangzhou | Women's doubles |
| Gold medal – first place | 2026 Aichi–Nagoya | Women's team |
| Silver medal – second place | 2018 Jakarta–Palembang | Women's team |
| Silver medal – second place | 2022 Hangzhou | Women's team |
Asian Championships
| Gold medal – first place | 2019 Wuhan | Women's doubles |
| Gold medal – first place | 2022 Manila | Women's doubles |
| Bronze medal – third place | 2024 Ningbo | Women's doubles |
| Bronze medal – third place | 2025 Ningbo | Women's doubles |
Asia Mixed Team Championships
| Bronze medal – third place | 2017 Ho Chi Minh | Mixed team |
Asia Team Championships
| Silver medal – second place | 2026 Qingdao | Women's team |
World Junior Championships
| Gold medal – first place | 2014 Alor Setar | Girls' doubles |
| Gold medal – first place | 2014 Alor Setar | Mixed team |
| Gold medal – first place | 2015 Lima | Girls' doubles |
| Gold medal – first place | 2015 Lima | Mixed team |
| Bronze medal – third place | 2013 Bangkok | Girls' doubles |
| Bronze medal – third place | 2013 Bangkok | Mixed team |
Asian Junior Championships
| Gold medal – first place | 2013 Kota Kinabalu | Girls' doubles |
| Gold medal – first place | 2013 Kota Kinabalu | Mixed team |
| Gold medal – first place | 2014 Taipei | Girls' doubles |
| Gold medal – first place | 2014 Taipei | Mixed team |
| Gold medal – first place | 2015 Bangkok | Mixed team |
| Silver medal – second place | 2015 Bangkok | Girls' doubles |

Jia Yifan (Chinese: 贾一凡; pinyin: Jiǎ Yīfán; Mandarin pronunciation: [tɕjà.í fǎn]; born 29 June 1997) is a Chinese badminton player and Olympic champion. With partner Chen Qingchen, Jia won silver in women's doubles at the 2020 Summer Olympics and gold in the same event at the 2024 Summer Olympics.

Jia won four gold medals at the World Championships in 2017, 2021, 2022, and 2023. She also won two gold medals at the Asian Games in 2018 and 2022, as well as at the 2019 and 2022 Asian Championships. Jia was part of the Chinese winning team in the 2019, 2021, 2023, and 2025 Sudirman Cup, and also at the 2020 and 2024 Uber Cup. She also won silver medal at the 2020 Summer Olympics. She reached a career-high ranking of world number 1 in the women's doubles with Chen Qingchen in November 2017.

== Career ==
In 2023, Jia and Chen Qingchen helped the national team reach the final of the Sudirman Cup by winning the deciding rubber, beating fellow former world no. 1 pair Yuki Fukushima and Sayaka Hirota in straight games. The team then ended the tournament by lifting the cup for 13 times. In August, Jia and Chen won the World Championships title by beating Apriyani Rahayu and Siti Fadia Silva Ramadhanti in the final. The duo becoming the first women's doubles to win four golds in the World Championships history. In October, they won the Denmark Open, becoming the first Chinese women's doubles pair to defend the title.

At the 2024 Summer Olympics, with partner Chen Qingchen, Jia won gold in the women's doubles event, defeating compatriots Liu Shengshu and Tan Ning 2–0 in the finals.

In October 2025, Jia was elected as BWF Athletes' Commission.

== Achievements ==
=== Olympic Games ===
Women's doubles
| Year | Venue | Partner | Opponent | Score | Result |
|---|---|---|---|---|---|
| 2020 | Musashino Forest Sport Plaza, Tokyo, Japan | (China) Chen Qingchen | (Indonesia) Greysia Polii (Indonesia) Apriyani Rahayu | 19–21, 15–21 | Silver |
| 2024 | Porte de La Chapelle Arena, Paris, France | (China) Chen Qingchen | (China) Liu Shengshu (China) Tan Ning | 22–20, 21–15 | Gold |

=== World Championships ===
Women's doubles
| Year | Venue | Partner | Opponent | Score | Result |
|---|---|---|---|---|---|
| 2017 | Emirates Arena, Glasgow, Scotland | (China) Chen Qingchen | (Japan) Yuki Fukushima (Japan) Sayaka Hirota | 21–18, 17–21, 21–15 | Gold |
| 2021 | Palacio de los Deportes Carolina Marín, Huelva, Spain | (China) Chen Qingchen | (South Korea) Lee So-hee (South Korea) Shin Seung-chan | 21–16, 21–17 | Gold |
| 2022 | Tokyo Metropolitan Gymnasium, Tokyo, Japan | (China) Chen Qingchen | (South Korea) Kim So-yeong (South Korea) Kong Hee-yong | 22–20, 21–14 | Gold |
| 2023 | Royal Arena, Copenhagen, Denmark | (China) Chen Qingchen | (Indonesia) Apriyani Rahayu (Indonesia) Siti Fadia Silva Ramadhanti | 21–16, 21–12 | Gold |

=== Asian Games ===
Women's doubles
| Year | Venue | Partner | Opponent | Score | Result |
|---|---|---|---|---|---|
| 2018 | Istora Gelora Bung Karno, Jakarta, Indonesia | (China) Chen Qingchen | (Japan) Misaki Matsutomo (Japan) Ayaka Takahashi | 22–20, 22–20 | Gold |
| 2022 | Binjiang Gymnasium, Hangzhou, China | (China) Chen Qingchen | (South Korea) Baek Ha-na (South Korea) Lee So-hee | 21–18, 21–17 | Gold |

=== Asian Championships ===
Women's doubles
| Year | Venue | Partner | Opponent | Score | Result |
|---|---|---|---|---|---|
| 2019 | Wuhan Sports Center Gymnasium; Wuhan, China | (China) Chen Qingchen | (Japan) Mayu Matsumoto (Japan) Wakana Nagahara | 19–21, 21–14, 21–19 | Gold |
| 2022 | Muntinlupa Sports Complex; Metro Manila, Philippines | (China) Chen Qingchen | (Japan) Rin Iwanaga (Japan) Kie Nakanishi | 21–11, 21–15 | Gold |
| 2024 | Ningbo Olympic Sports Center Gymnasium, Ningbo, China | (China) Chen Qingchen | (China) Zhang Shuxian (China) Zheng Yu | 14–21, 16–21 | Bronze |
| 2025 | Ningbo Olympic Sports Center Gymnasium, Ningbo, China | (China) Chen Qingchen | (Japan) Nami Matsuyama (Japan) Chiharu Shida | 17–21, 10–21 | Bronze |

=== World Junior Championships ===
Girls' doubles
| Year | Venue | Partner | Opponent | Score | Result |
|---|---|---|---|---|---|
| 2013 | Hua Mark Indoor Stadium; Bangkok, Thailand | (China) Huang Dongping | (South Korea) Chae Yoo-jung (South Korea) Kim Ji-won | 20–22, 21–16, 20–22 | Bronze |
| 2014 | Stadium Sultan Abdul Halim; Alor Setar, Malaysia | (China) Chen Qingchen | (Indonesia) Rosyita Eka Putri Sari (Indonesia) Apriyani Rahayu | 21–11, 21–14 | Gold |
| 2015 | Centro de Alto Rendimiento de la Videna; Lima, Peru | (China) Chen Qingchen | (China) Du Yue (China) Li Yinhui | 21–18, 13–21, 21–11 | Gold |

=== Asian Junior Championships ===
Girls' doubles
| Year | Venue | Partner | Opponent | Score | Result |
|---|---|---|---|---|---|
| 2013 | Likas Indoor Stadium; Kota Kinabalu, Malaysia | (China) Huang Dongping | (China) Chen Qingchen (China) He Jiaxin | 21–19, 21–16 | Gold |
| 2014 | Taipei Gymnasium; Taipei, Taiwan | (China) Chen Qingchen | (China) Du Yue (China) Li Yinhui | 21–11, 21–18 | Gold |
| 2015 | CPB Badminton Training Center; Bangkok, Thailand | (China) Chen Qingchen | (China) Du Yue (China) Li Yinhui | 14–21, 21–18, 18–21 | Silver |

=== BWF World Tour (24 titles, 13 runners-up) ===
The BWF World Tour, which was announced on 19 March 2017 and implemented in 2018, is a series of elite badminton tournaments sanctioned by the Badminton World Federation (BWF). The BWF World Tour is divided into levels of World Tour Finals, Super 1000, Super 750, Super 500, Super 300, and the BWF Tour Super 100.

Women's doubles
| Year | Tournament | Level | Partner | Opponent | Score | Result |
|---|---|---|---|---|---|---|
| 2018 | Malaysia Masters | Super 500 | (China) Chen Qingchen | (Denmark) Kamilla Rytter Juhl (Denmark) Christinna Pedersen | 20–22, 18–21 | (silver) Runner-up |
| 2018 | Malaysia Open | Super 750 | (China) Chen Qingchen | (Japan) Misaki Matsutomo (Japan) Ayaka Takahashi | 12–21, 12–21 | (silver) Runner-up |
| 2018 | Japan Open | Super 750 | (China) Chen Qingchen | (Japan) Yuki Fukushima (Japan) Sayaka Hirota | 15–21, 12–21 | (silver) Runner-up |
| 2019 | All England Open | Super 1000 | (China) Chen Qingchen | (Japan) Mayu Matsumoto (Japan) Wakana Nagahara | 18–21, 22–20, 21–11 | (gold) Winner |
| 2019 | Malaysia Open | Super 750 | (China) Chen Qingchen | (China) Du Yue (China) Li Yinhui | 21–14, 21–15 | (gold) Winner |
| 2019 | Australian Open | Super 300 | (China) Chen Qingchen | (Japan) Yuki Fukushima (Japan) Sayaka Hirota | 10–21, 16–21 | (silver) Runner-up |
| 2019 | China Open | Super 1000 | (China) Chen Qingchen | (Japan) Misaki Matsutomo (Japan) Ayaka Takahashi | 21–14, 21–18 | (gold) Winner |
| 2019 | Denmark Open | Super 750 | (China) Chen Qingchen | (South Korea) Baek Ha-na (South Korea) Jung Kyung-eun | 21–9, 19–21, 15–21 | (silver) Runner-up |
| 2019 | Hong Kong Open | Super 500 | (China) Chen Qingchen | (South Korea) Chang Ye-na (South Korea) Kim Hye-rin | 21–11, 13–21, 21–15 | (gold) Winner |
| 2019 | BWF World Tour Finals | World Tour Finals | (China) Chen Qingchen | (Japan) Mayu Matsumoto (Japan) Wakana Nagahara | 21–14, 21–10 | (gold) Winner |
| 2020 | Thailand Masters | Super 300 | (China) Chen Qingchen | (South Korea) Baek Ha-na (South Korea) Jung Kyung-eun | 17–21, 21–17, 21–15 | (gold) Winner |
| 2022 | German Open | Super 300 | (China) Chen Qingchen | (Bulgaria) Gabriela Stoeva (Bulgaria) Stefani Stoeva | 21–16, 29–30, 21–19 | (gold) Winner |
| 2022 | Indonesia Masters | Super 500 | (China) Chen Qingchen | (Indonesia) Apriyani Rahayu (Indonesia) Siti Fadia Silva Ramadhanti | 21–18, 21–12 | (gold) Winner |
| 2022 | Malaysia Masters | Super 500 | (China) Chen Qingchen | (Japan) Nami Matsuyama (Japan) Chiharu Shida | 21–11, 21–12 | (gold) Winner |
| 2022 | Denmark Open | Super 750 | (China) Chen Qingchen | (South Korea) Baek Ha-na (South Korea) Lee So-hee | 21–12, 21–15 | (gold) Winner |
| 2022 | BWF World Tour Finals | World Tour Finals | (China) Chen Qingchen | (Thailand) Benyapa Aimsaard (Thailand) Nuntakarn Aimsaard | 21–13, 21–14 | (gold) Winner |
| 2023 | Malaysia Open | Super 1000 | (China) Chen Qingchen | (South Korea) Baek Ha-na (South Korea) Lee Yu-lim | 21–16, 21–10 | (gold) Winner |
| 2023 | India Open | Super 750 | (China) Chen Qingchen | (Japan) Nami Matsuyama (Japan) Chiharu Shida | Walkover | (silver) Runner-up |
| 2023 | Singapore Open | Super 750 | (China) Chen Qingchen | (South Korea) Baek Ha-na (South Korea) Lee So-hee | 21–16, 21–12 | (gold) Winner |
| 2023 | Korea Open | Super 500 | (China) Chen Qingchen | (South Korea) Kim So-yeong (South Korea) Kong Hee-yong | 21–10, 17–21, 21–7 | (gold) Winner |
| 2023 | Japan Open | Super 750 | (China) Chen Qingchen | (South Korea) Kim So-yeong (South Korea) Kong Hee-yong | 17–21, 14–21 | (silver) Runner-up |
| 2023 | China Open | Super 1000 | (China) Chen Qingchen | (South Korea) Baek Ha-na (South Korea) Lee So-hee | 21–11, 21–17 | (gold) Winner |
| 2023 | Denmark Open | Super 750 | (China) Chen Qingchen | (Japan) Nami Matsuyama (Japan) Chiharu Shida | 21–16, 21–13 | (gold) Winner |
| 2023 | BWF World Tour Finals | World Tour Finals | (China) Chen Qingchen | (South Korea) Baek Ha-na (South Korea) Lee So-hee | 21–16, 21–16 | (gold) Winner |
| 2024 | French Open | Super 750 | (China) Chen Qingchen | (Japan) Nami Matsuyama (Japan) Chiharu Shida | 21–12, 19–21, 24–22 | (gold) Winner |
| 2024 | Singapore Open | Super 750 | (China) Chen Qingchen | (Japan) Nami Matsuyama (Japan) Chiharu Shida | 21–15, 21–12 | (gold) Winner |
| 2024 | Indonesia Open | Super 1000 | (China) Chen Qingchen | (South Korea) Baek Ha-na (South Korea) Lee So-hee | 17–21, 13–21 | (silver) Runner-up |
| 2025 | Malaysia Open | Super 1000 | (China) Zhang Shuxian | (Japan) Yuki Fukushima (Japan) Mayu Matsumoto | 21–17, 15–21, 15–21 | (silver) Runner-up |
| 2025 | Swiss Open | Super 300 | (China) Zhang Shuxian | (China) Liu Shengshu (China) Tan Ning | 21–19, 14–21, 21–17 | (gold) Winner |
| 2025 | Malaysia Masters | Super 500 | (China) Zhang Shuxian | (China) Liu Shengshu (China) Tan Ning | 17–21, 18–21 | (silver) Runner-up |
| 2025 | China Open | Super 1000 | (China) Zhang Shuxian | (China) Liu Shengshu (China) Tan Ning | 22–24, 21–17, 14–21 | (silver) Runner-up |
| 2025 | Hong Kong Open | Super 500 | (China) Zhang Shuxian | (Japan) Rin Iwanaga (Japan) Kie Nakanishi | 21–17, 21–15 | (gold) Winner |
| 2025 | China Masters | Super 750 | (China) Zhang Shuxian | (South Korea) Kim Hye-jeong (South Korea) Kong Hee-yong | 21–19, 16–21, 21–13 | (gold) Winner |
| 2026 | Swiss Open | Super 300 | (China) Zhang Shuxian | (China) Li Yijing (China) Wang Yiduo | 10–21, 20–22 | (silver) Runner-up |
| 2026 | Singapore Open | Super 750 | (China) Zhang Shuxian | (China) Liu Shengshu (China) Tan Ning | 22–20, 21–19 | (gold) Winner |
| 2026 | Australian Open | Super 500 | (China) Zhang Shuxian | (Indonesia) Febriana Dwipuji Kusuma (Indonesia) Meilysa Trias Puspita Sari | 24–22, 21–13 | (gold) Winner |
| 2026 | Japan Open | Super 750 | (China) Zhang Shuxian | (South Korea) Kim Hye-jeong (South Korea) Kong Hee-yong | 21–14, 15–21, 29–30 | (silver) Runner-up |

=== BWF Superseries (5 titles) ===
The BWF Superseries, which was launched on 14 December 2006 and implemented in 2007, was a series of elite badminton tournaments, sanctioned by the Badminton World Federation (BWF). BWF Superseries levels were Superseries and Superseries Premier. A season of Superseries consisted of twelve tournaments around the world that had been introduced since 2011. Successful players were invited to the Superseries Finals, which were held at the end of each year.

Women's doubles
| Year | Tournament | Partner | Opponent | Score | Result |
|---|---|---|---|---|---|
| 2016 | French Open | (China) Chen Qingchen | (South Korea) Chang Ye-na (South Korea) Lee So-hee | 21–16, 21–17 | (gold) Winner |
| 2016 | Dubai World Superseries Finals | (China) Chen Qingchen | (Japan) Misaki Matsutomo (Japan) Ayaka Takahashi | 21–15, 13–21, 21–17 | (gold) Winner |
| 2017 | Indonesia Open | (China) Chen Qingchen | (South Korea) Chang Ye-na (South Korea) Lee So-hee | 21–19, 15–21, 21–10 | (gold) Winner |
| 2017 | China Open | (China) Chen Qingchen | (South Korea) Kim Hye-rin (South Korea) Lee So-hee | 21–7, 18–21, 21–14 | (gold) Winner |
| 2017 | Hong Kong Open | (China) Chen Qingchen | (Indonesia) Greysia Polii (Indonesia) Apriyani Rahayu | 14–21, 21–16, 21–15 | (gold) Winner |

BWF Super Series Finals tournament
BWF Super Series Premier tournament
BWF Super Series tournament

=== BWF Grand Prix (6 titles, 2 runners-up) ===
The BWF Grand Prix had two levels, the Grand Prix and Grand Prix Gold. It was a series of badminton tournaments sanctioned by the Badminton World Federation (BWF) and played between 2007 and 2017.

Women's doubles
| Year | Tournament | Partner | Opponent | Score | Result |
|---|---|---|---|---|---|
| 2013 | Indonesia Grand Prix Gold | (China) Huang Dongping | (China) Luo Ying (China) Luo Yu | 21–19, 15–21, 18–21 | (silver) Runner-up |
| 2014 | India Grand Prix Gold | (China) Chen Qingchen | (China) Huang Yaqiong (China) Yu Xiaohan | 22–24, 21–19, 21–11 | (gold) Winner |
| 2015 | Brasil Open | (China) Chen Qingchen | (Netherlands) Eefje Muskens (Netherlands) Selena Piek | 21–17, 21–14 | (gold) Winner |
| 2016 | China Masters | (China) Chen Qingchen | (China) Luo Ying (China) Luo Yu | 21–16, 15–21, 18–21 | (silver) Runner-up |
| 2016 | Bitburger Open | (China) Chen Qingchen | (Thailand) Jongkolphan Kititharakul (Thailand) Rawinda Prajongjai | 21–12, 21–19 | (gold) Winner |
| 2016 | Macau Open | (China) Chen Qingchen | (Indonesia) Anggia Shitta Awanda (Indonesia) Ni Ketut Mahadewi Istarani | 21–15, 21–13 | (gold) Winner |
| 2017 | Thailand Masters | (China) Chen Qingchen | (Thailand) Puttita Supajirakul (Thailand) Sapsiree Taerattanachai | 21–16, 21–15 | (gold) Winner |
| 2017 | Swiss Open | (China) Chen Qingchen | (Bulgaria) Gabriela Stoeva (Bulgaria) Stefani Stoeva | 21–16, 21–15 | (gold) Winner |

BWF Grand Prix Gold tournament
BWF Grand Prix tournament

=== BWF International Challenge/Series (2 titles, 1 runner-up) ===
Women's doubles
| Year | Tournament | Partner | Opponent | Score | Result |
|---|---|---|---|---|---|
| 2015 | Osaka International | (China) Chen Qingchen | (Japan) Yuki Fukushima (Japan) Sayaka Hirota | 21–17, 21–15 | (gold) Winner |
| 2016 | China International | (China) Chen Qingchen | (China) Hu Yuxiang (China) Xu Ya | 21–8, 21–10 | (gold) Winner |

Mixed doubles
| Year | Tournament | Partner | Opponent | Score | Result |
|---|---|---|---|---|---|
| 2016 | China International | (China) Zhou Haodong | (China) Wang Sijie (China) Chen Lu | 18–21, 21–18, 17–21 | (silver) Runner-up |

BWF International Challenge tournament
BWF International Series tournament

== Performance timeline ==
Key

| W | Won | F | Finalist | SF | Semi-finalist |
| QF | Quarter-finalist | #R | Rounds 4, 3, 2, 1 | RR | Round-robin stage |
| Q# | Qualification round | A | Absent | w/d | Withdrew |
| G | Gold | S | Silver | B | Bronze |
| NH | Not held | N/A | Not applicable | DNQ | Did not qualify |

=== National team ===
- Junior level

| Team events | 2013 | 2014 | 2015 |
|---|---|---|---|
| Asian Junior Championships | G | G | G |
| World Junior Championships | B | G | G |

- Senior level

| Team events | 2017 | 2018 | 2019 | 2020 | 2021 | 2022 | 2023 | 2024 | 2025 | 2026 | Ref |
|---|---|---|---|---|---|---|---|---|---|---|---|
| Asia Team Championships | NH | A | NH | A | NH | A | NH | A | NH | S | |
| Asia Mixed Team Championships | B | NH | A | NH | | | A | NH | A | NH | |
| Asian Games | NH | S | NH | | | S | NH | | | G | |
| Uber Cup | NH | B | NH | G | NH | S | NH | G | NH | S | |
| Sudirman Cup | S | NH | G | NH | G | NH | G | NH | G | NH | |

=== Individual competitions ===
==== Junior level ====
Girls' doubles

| Events | 2013 | 2014 | 2015 |
|---|---|---|---|
| Asia Junior Championships | G | G | S |
| World Junior Championships | B | G | G |

==== Senior level ====
===== Women's doubles =====
| Events | 2016 | 2017 | 2018 | 2019 | 2020 | 2021 | 2022 | 2023 | 2024 | 2025 | 2026 |
|---|---|---|---|---|---|---|---|---|---|---|---|
| Asian Championships | 2R | QF | 2R | G | NH | | G | QF | B | B | 2R |
| Asian Games | NH | | G | NH | | | G | NH | | | 2R |
| World Championships | NH | G | QF | QF | NH | G | G | G | NH | QF | QF |
| Olympic Games | DNQ | NH | | | S | NH | | | G | NH | |

| Tournament | BWF Superseries / Grand Prix | | | | | BWF World Tour | | | | | | | | | Best |
| Tournament | 2013 | 2014 | 2015 | 2016 | 2017 | 2018 | 2019 | 2020 | 2021 | 2022 | 2023 | 2024 | 2025 | 2026 | Best |
|---|---|---|---|---|---|---|---|---|---|---|---|---|---|---|---|
| Malaysia Open | A | | | QF | QF | F | W | NH | | QF | W | QF | F | 2R | W ('19, '23) |
| India Open | A | | | QF | A | | | NH | | A | F | w/d | 2R | w/d | F ('23) |
| Indonesia Masters | F | A | | | NH | 2R | QF | 2R | A | W | A | | SF | A | W ('22) |
| Thailand Masters | NH | | | QF | W | A | | W | NH | | A | | w/d | A | W ('17, '20) |
| German Open | A | | | QF | A | QF | QF | NH | | W | A | | | | W ('22) |
| All England Open | A | | | 2R | 1R | QF | W | QF | A | 1R | QF | 2R | SF | SF | W ('19) |
| Swiss Open | A | | | QF | W | A | QF | NH | A | w/d | A | | W | F | W ('17, '25) |
| Orléans Masters | A | | | | | | | NH | A | | | | SF | A | SF ('25) |
| Chinese Taipei Open | A | | | SF | A | | | NH | | A | | | | | SF ('16) |
| Thailand Open | A | NH | SF | A | | | | | NH | QF | A | | | | SF ('15) |
| Malaysia Masters | A | | | | | F | A | 2R | NH | W | A | | F | A | W ('22) |
| Singapore Open | A | | | QF | QF | A | | NH | | w/d | W | W | SF | W | W ('23, '24, '26) |
| Indonesia Open | A | | | | W | SF | SF | NH | A | QF | QF | F | 2R | 1R | W (17) |
| Australian Open | A | | | | SF | A | F | NH | | A | | | | W | W ('26) |
| Macau Open | A | | | W | w/d | A | | NH | | | | A | | | W ('16) |
| Japan Open | A | | | | 1R | F | 2R | NH | | SF | F | SF | SF | F | F ('18, '23, '26) |
| China Open | A | 1R | A | 1R | W | QF | W | NH | | | W | SF | F | 1R | W ('17, '19, '23) |
| Korea Masters | A | | | | | | | NH | | A | | w/d | A | | — |
| China Masters | w/d | A | SF | F | A | 2R | SF | NH | | | SF | QF | W | SF | W ('25) |
| Arctic Open | N/A | | | | | | | NH | | | A | QF | A | | QF ('24) |
| Denmark Open | A | | | 1R | 2R | 2R | F | A | 1R | W | W | QF | SF | A | W ('22, '23) |
| French Open | A | | | W | SF | 1R | QF | NH | A | QF | 2R | W | SF | A | W ('16, '24) |
| Hylo Open | A | 2R | A | W | A | | | | | | | | | | W ('16) |
| Korea Open | A | | | | | | QF | NH | | A | W | A | QF | A | W ('23) |
| Japan Masters | NH | | | | | | | | | | 1R | QF | A | | QF ('24) |
| Hong Kong Open | A | | | SF | W | 1R | W | NH | | | A | | W | 1R | W ('17, '19, '25) |
| Syed Modi International | NH | W | A | | | | | NH | | A | | | | | W ('14) |
| BWF Superseries / Tour Finals | DNQ | | | W | RR | RR | W | DNQ | | W | W | SF | RR | | W ('16, '19, '22, '23) |
| Brasil Open | NH | A | W | A | NH | | | | | | | | | | W ('15) |
| New Zealand Open | A | | 2R | A | | | | NH | | | | | | | 2R ('15) |
| Year-end ranking | 156 | 98 | 52 | 6 | 1 | 5 | 1 | 1 | 1 | 1 | 1 | 4 | 4 | | 1 |
| Tournament | 2013 | 2014 | 2015 | 2016 | 2017 | 2018 | 2019 | 2020 | 2021 | 2022 | 2023 | 2024 | 2025 | 2026 | Best |

===== Mixed doubles =====
| Tournament | BWF Superseries / Grand Prix | | | | Best |
| Tournament | 2013 | 2014 | 2015 | 2016 | Best |
|---|---|---|---|---|---|
| New Zealand Open | A | | 1R | A | 1R ('15) |
| India Open | A | | | QF | QF ('16) |
| Thailand Open | A | NH | QF | A | QF ('15) |
| Chinese Taipei Open | A | | | 1R | 1R ('16) |
| Syed Modi International | NH | QF | A | | QF ('14) |
| Hylo Open | A | 2R | A | | 2R ('14) |
| Indonesia Masters | 2R | A | | | 2R ('13) |
| Brasil Open | NH | A | SF | A | SF ('15) |
| Year-end ranking | 346 | 263 | 260 | 156 | 97 |
| Tournament | 2013 | 2014 | 2015 | 2016 | Best |
