= Sayaka Hirota =

Japanese badminton player (born 1994)

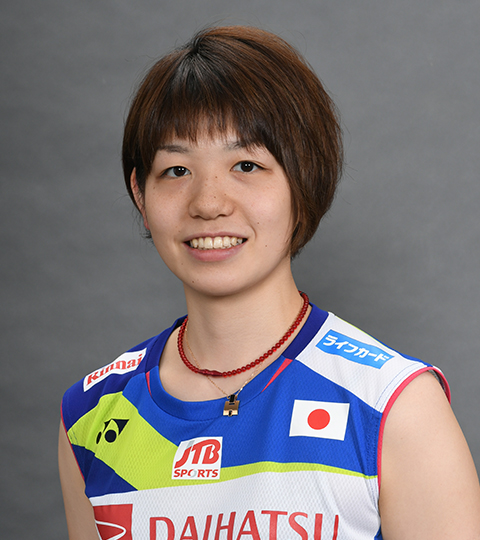

Personal information
- Born: 1 August 1994 (age 32) Kumamoto, Japan
- Height: 1.70 m (5 ft 7 in)

Sport
- Country: Japan
- Sport: Badminton
- Handedness: Right

Women's doubles
- Highest ranking: 1 (with Yuki Fukushima, 21 June 2018)
- Current ranking: 15 (with Ayako Sakuramoto, 17 November 2026)
- BWF profile
Medal record
Women's badminton
Representing Japan
World Championships
Silver medal – second place	2017 Glasgow	Women's doubles
Silver medal – second place	2018 Nanjing	Women's doubles
Silver medal – second place	2019 Basel	Women's doubles
Sudirman Cup
Silver medal – second place	2019 Nanning	Mixed team
Bronze medal – third place	2023 Suzhou	Mixed team
Uber Cup
Gold medal – first place	2018 Bangkok	Women's team
Bronze medal – third place	2022 Bangkok	Women's team
Asian Games
Gold medal – first place	2018 Jakarta–Palembang	Women's team
Bronze medal – third place	2018 Jakarta–Palembang	Women's doubles
Bronze medal – third place	2022 Hangzhou	Women's doubles
Bronze medal – third place	2022 Hangzhou	Women's team
Asian Championships
Gold medal – first place	2018 Wuhan	Women's doubles
Gold medal – first place	2023 Dubai	Women's doubles
Bronze medal – third place	2019 Wuhan	Women's doubles
Bronze medal – third place	2022 Manila	Women's doubles
Asia Team Championships
Gold medal – first place	2018 Alor Setar	Women's team
Gold medal – first place	2020 Manila	Women's team

Sayaka Hirota (廣田 彩花, Hirota Sayaka; born 1 August 1994) is a Japanese badminton player affiliated with Gifu Bluvic team. She and her partner Yuki Fukushima won the 2017 Most Improved Player of the Year award. Hirota and Fukushima were ranked world No. 1 at the BWF World Ranking on 21 June 2018.

== Career ==
=== 2026 ===
Hirota began competing with Ayako Sakuramoto, and the pair reached the quarterfinals of the All England Open in March. Later in the year, the duo advanced to the final of the Super 500 Malaysia Masters, where they finished as runners-up to Chen Fanshutian and Luo Xumin. In September, Hirota and Sakuramoto reached the semi-finals of the China Masters, where they were defeated by eventual champions Sumire Nakade and Miyu Takahashi in three games.

In October, Hirota and Sakuramoto reached the quarter-finals of the Arctic Open, where they lost to the eventual champions Chen Fanshutian and Luo Xumin.

== Awards and nominations ==
Award	Year	Category	Result	Ref.
BWF Awards	2017	Most Improved Player of the Year with Yuki Fukushima	Won	
BWF Awards	2018	Female Player of the Year with Yuki Fukushima	Nominated	
BWF Awards	2019	Female Player of the Year with Yuki Fukushima	Nominated	

== Achievements ==
=== World Championships ===
Women's doubles
Year	Venue	Partner	Opponent	Score	Result	Ref.
2017	Emirates Arena, Glasgow, Scotland	(Japan) Yuki Fukushima	(China) Chen Qingchen (China) Jia Yifan	18–21, 21–17, 15–21	Silver	
2018	Nanjing Youth Olympic Sports Park, Nanjing, China	(Japan) Yuki Fukushima	(Japan) Mayu Matsumoto (Japan) Wakana Nagahara	21–19, 19–21, 20–22	Silver	
2019	St. Jakobshalle, Basel, Switzerland	(Japan) Yuki Fukushima	(Japan) Mayu Matsumoto (Japan) Wakana Nagahara	11–21, 22–20, 21–23	Silver	

=== Asian Games ===
Women's doubles
Year	Venue	Partner	Opponent	Score	Result
2018	Istora Gelora Bung Karno, Jakarta, Indonesia	(Japan) Yuki Fukushima	(China) Chen Qingchen (China) Jia Yifan	17–21, 8–21	Bronze
2022	Binjiang Gymnasium, Hangzhou, China	(Japan) Yuki Fukushima	(South Korea) Baek Ha-na (South Korea) Lee So-hee	14–21, 12–21	Bronze

=== Asian Championships ===
Women's doubles
Year	Venue	Partner	Opponent	Score	Result	Ref.
2018	Wuhan Sports Center Gymnasium; Wuhan, China	(Japan) Yuki Fukushima	(Japan) Misaki Matsutomo (Japan) Ayaka Takahashi	21–18, 18–21, 21–15	Gold	
2019	Wuhan Sports Center Gymnasium; Wuhan, China	(Japan) Yuki Fukushima	(Japan) Mayu Matsumoto (Japan) Wakana Nagahara	16–21, 24–26	Bronze	
2022	Muntinlupa Sports Complex; Metro Manila, Philippines	(Japan) Yuki Fukushima	(Japan) Rin Iwanaga (Japan) Kie Nakanishi	21–16, 15–21, 19–21	Bronze	
2023	Sheikh Rashid Bin Hamdan Indoor Hall; Dubai, United Arab Emirates	(Japan) Yuki Fukushima	(South Korea) Baek Ha-na (South Korea) Lee So-hee	21–7, 21–14	Gold	

=== BWF World Tour (11 titles, 9 runners-up) ===
The BWF World Tour, which was announced on 19 March 2017 and implemented in 2018, is a series of elite badminton tournaments sanctioned by the Badminton World Federation (BWF). The BWF World Tour is divided into levels of World Tour Finals, Super 1000, Super 750, Super 500, Super 300 (part of the HSBC World Tour), and the BWF Tour Super 100.

Women's doubles
Year	Tournament	Level	Partner	Opponent	Score	Result	Ref.
2018	German Open	Super 300	(Japan) Yuki Fukushima	(China) Huang Dongping (China) Zheng Yu	18–21, 21–14, 21–6	(gold) Winner	
2018	All England Open	Super 1000	(Japan) Yuki Fukushima	(Denmark) Christinna Pedersen (Denmark) Kamilla Rytter Juhl	19–21, 18–21	(silver) Runner-up	
2018	Indonesia Open	Super 1000	(Japan) Yuki Fukushima	(Japan) Mayu Matsumoto (Japan) Wakana Nagahara	21–14, 16–21, 21–14	(gold) Winner	
2018	Japan Open	Super 750	(Japan) Yuki Fukushima	(China) Chen Qingchen (China) Jia Yifan	21–15, 21–12	(gold) Winner	
2018	Korea Open	Super 500	(Japan) Yuki Fukushima	(Japan) Misaki Matsutomo (Japan) Ayaka Takahashi	11–21, 18–21	(silver) Runner-up	
2018	Denmark Open	Super 750	(Japan) Yuki Fukushima	(Japan) Shiho Tanaka (Japan) Koharu Yonemoto	21–19, 21–16	(gold) Winner	
2018	Hong Kong Open	Super 500	(Japan) Yuki Fukushima	(South Korea) Lee So-hee (South Korea) Shin Seung-chan	21–18, 21–17	(gold) Winner	
2019	Malaysia Masters	Super 500	(Japan) Yuki Fukushima	(Indonesia) Greysia Polii (Indonesia) Apriyani Rahayu	18–21, 21–16, 21–16	(gold) Winner	
2019	Australian Open	Super 300	(Japan) Yuki Fukushima	(China) Chen Qingchen (China) Jia Yifan	21–10, 21–16	(gold) Winner	
2019	Indonesia Open	Super 1000	(Japan) Yuki Fukushima	(Japan) Misaki Matsutomo (Japan) Ayaka Takahashi	21–16, 21–18	(gold) Winner	
2019	Fuzhou China Open	Super 750	(Japan) Yuki Fukushima	(South Korea) Lee So-hee (South Korea) Shin Seung-chan	21–17, 21–15	(gold) Winner	
2020	All England Open	Super 1000	(Japan) Yuki Fukushima	(China) Du Yue (China) Li Yinhui	21–13, 21–15	(gold) Winner	
2020	Denmark Open	Super 750	(Japan) Yuki Fukushima	(Japan) Mayu Matsumoto (Japan) Wakana Nagahara	21–10, 16–21, 21–18	(gold) Winner	
2021	All England Open	Super 1000	(Japan) Yuki Fukushima	(Japan) Mayu Matsumoto (Japan) Wakana Nagahara	18–21, 16–21	(silver) Runner-up	
2022	Indonesia Open	Super 1000	(Japan) Yuki Fukushima	(Japan) Nami Matsuyama (Japan) Chiharu Shida	21–18, 14–21, 17–21	(silver) Runner-up	
2023	Indonesia Masters	Super 500	(Japan) Yuki Fukushima	(China) Liu Shengshu (China) Zhang Shuxian	20–22, 19–21	(silver) Runner-up	
2023	Swiss Open	Super 300	(Japan) Yuki Fukushima	(Japan) Rena Miyaura (Japan) Ayako Sakuramoto	Walkover	(silver) Runner-up	
2023	Indonesia Open	Super 1000	(Japan) Yuki Fukushima	(South Korea) Baek Ha-na (South Korea) Lee So-hee	20–22, 10–21	(silver) Runner-up	
2023	China Masters	Super 750	(Japan) Yuki Fukushima	(Japan) Nami Matsuyama (Japan) Chiharu Shida	18–21, 11–21	(silver) Runner-up	
2026	Malaysia Masters	Super 500	(Japan) Ayako Sakuramoto	(China) Chen Fanshutian (China) Luo Xumin	16–21, 23–25	(silver) Runner-up	

=== BWF Superseries (1 title, 2 runners-up) ===
The BWF Superseries, which was launched on 14 December 2006 and implemented in 2007, was a series of elite badminton tournaments, sanctioned by the Badminton World Federation (BWF). BWF Superseries levels were Superseries and Superseries Premier. A season of Superseries consisted of twelve tournaments around the world that had been introduced since 2011. Successful players were invited to the Superseries Finals, which were held at the end of each year.

Women's doubles
Year	Tournament	Partner	Opponent	Score	Result	Ref.
2017	Malaysia Open	(Japan) Yuki Fukushima	(China) Huang Yaqiong (China) Tang Jinhua	21–17, 18–21, 21–12	(gold) Winner	
2017	Dubai World Superseries Finals	(Japan) Yuki Fukushima	(Japan) Shiho Tanaka (Japan) Koharu Yonemoto	16–21, 15–21	(silver) Runner-up	

Mixed doubles
Year	Tournament	Partner	Opponent	Score	Result	Ref.
2017	Japan Open	(Japan) Takuro Hoki	(China) Wang Yilyu (China) Huang Dongping	13–21, 8–21	(silver) Runner-up	

BWF Super Series Finals tournament
BWF Super Series Premier tournament
BWF Super Series tournament

=== BWF Grand Prix (4 titles, 1 runners-up) ===
The BWF Grand Prix had two levels, the Grand Prix and Grand Prix Gold. It was a series of badminton tournaments sanctioned by the Badminton World Federation (BWF) and played between 2007 and 2017.

Women's doubles
Year	Tournament	Partner	Opponent	Score	Result	Ref.
2015	New Zealand Open	(Japan) Yuki Fukushima	(China) Xia Huan (China) Zhong Qianxin	21–17, 22–24, 19–21	(silver) Runner-up	
2015	Scottish Open	(Japan) Yuki Fukushima	(Netherlands) Samantha Barning (Netherlands) Iris Tabeling	21–14, 14–11 Retired	(gold) Winner	
2016	New Zealand Open	(Japan) Yuki Fukushima	(South Korea) Chang Ye-na (South Korea) Lee So-hee	21–13, 21–16	(gold) Winner	
2016	Chinese Taipei Masters	(Japan) Yuki Fukushima	(Japan) Shiho Tanaka (Japan) Koharu Yonemoto	11–10, 11–5, 11–7	(gold) Winner	
2017	German Open	(Japan) Yuki Fukushima	(China) Huang Dongping (China) Li Yinhui	15–21, 21–17, 21–15	(gold) Winner	

BWF Grand Prix Gold tournament
BWF Grand Prix tournament

=== BWF International Challenge/Series (3 titles, 1 runner-up) ===
Women's doubles
Year	Tournament	Partner	Opponent	Score	Result	Ref.
2014	Sydney International	(Japan) Yuki Fukushima	(Indonesia) Sylvina Kurniawan (Australia) Susan Wang	11–5, 11–5, 11–2	(gold) Winner	
2015	Osaka International	(Japan) Yuki Fukushima	(China) Chen Qingchen (China) Jia Yifan	17–21, 15–21	(silver) Runner-up	
2016	Spanish International	(Japan) Nao Ono	(Japan) Yuki Fukushima (Japan) Chiharu Shida	21–14, 13–21, 21–19	(gold) Winner	
2025	Thailand International	(Japan) Maiko Kawazoe	(Japan) Mio Konegawa (Japan) An Uesugi	24–22, 21–17	(gold) Winner	

BWF International Challenge tournament

== Performance timeline ==
Key

W	Won	F	Finalist	SF	Semi-finalist
QF	Quarter-finalist	#R	Rounds 4, 3, 2, 1	RR	Round-robin stage
Q#	Qualification round	A	Absent	w/d	Withdrew
G	Gold	S	Silver	B	Bronze
NH	Not held	N/A	Not applicable	DNQ	Did not qualify

=== National team ===
- Senior level

Team events	2018	2019	2020	2021	2022	2023	2024	Ref.
Asia Team Championships	G	NH	G	NH	A	NH	A	
Asian Games	G	NH			B	NH		
Uber Cup	G	NH	A	NH	B	NH	A	
Sudirman Cup	NH	S	NH	A	NH	B	NH	

=== Individual competitions ===
==== Senior level ====
===== Women's singles =====
Tournament	BWF Superseries / Grand Prix			Best
Tournament	2013	2014	2015	Best
Korea Masters	1R	A		1R ('13)
Scottish Open	A		1R	1R ('15)
Year-end ranking	351	396	337	239

===== Women's doubles =====
Events	2016	2017	2018	2019	2020	2021	2022	2023	2024
Asian Championships	2R	1R	G	B	NH		B	G	1R
Asian Games	NH		B	NH			B	NH	
World Championships	NH	S	S	S	NH	A	w/d	QF	NH
Olympic Games	DNQ	NH			QF	NH			DNQ

Tournament	BWF Superseries / Grand Prix					BWF World Tour									Best	Ref.
Tournament	2013	2014	2015	2016	2017	2018	2019	2020	2021	2022	2023	2024	2025	2026	Best	Ref.
Malaysia Open	A				W	2R	QF	NH		w/d	1R	A			W ('17)	
India Open	A			1R	SF	A		NH		A	2R	A			SF ('17)	
Indonesia Masters	A				NH	A	1R	2R	A		F	A			F ('23)	
German Open	A			2R	W	W	SF	NH		A	QF	A			W ('17, '18)	
All England Open	A				QF	F	SF	W	F	1R	2R	QF	A	QF	W ('20)	
Swiss Open	A							NH	A		F	A			F ('23)	
Thailand Open	A	NH	A			QF	2R	w/d	NH	QF	A			QF	QF ('18, '22, '26)	
Thailand Open	A	NH	A			QF	2R	w/d	NH	QF	A			QF	QF ('18, '22, '26)	
Malaysia Masters	A	1R	1R	QF	A	SF	W	2R	NH	2R	QF	A		F	W ('19)	
Singapore Open	A			2R	1R	A	SF	NH		A	2R	A			SF ('19)	
Indonesia Open	A				QF	W	W	NH	A	F	F	A			W ('18, '19)	
Australian Open	A				SF	A	W	NH		QF	SF	A			W ('19)	
Macau Open	A		SF	A				NH				A			SF ('15)	
U.S. Open	A							NH			A			QF	QF ('26)	
Canada Open	A							NH		A	SF	A		w/d	SF ('23)	
Japan Open	A	1R	1R	2R	SF	W	QF	NH		w/d	SF	A		2R	W ('18)	
China Open	A				QF	QF	SF	NH			QF	A		2R	SF ('19)	
Taipei Open	A		2R	A				NH		A					2R ('15)	
Korea Masters	QF	QF	SF	1R	A			NH		A					SF ('15)	
China Masters	A			QF	A	2R	W	NH			F	A		SF	W ('19)	
Vietnam Open	A			2R	A			NH		A					2R ('16)	
Arctic Open	N/A										A			QF	QF ('26)	
Denmark Open	A				2R	W	SF	W	A	QF	1R	A		QF	W ('18, '20)	
French Open	A				2R	2R	SF	NH	A	SF	QF	2R	A	2R	SF ('19, '22)	
Korea Open	A				2R	F	2R	NH		A	2R	A		w/d	F ('18)	
Japan Masters	NH										1R	A	1R	2R	2R ('26)	
Hong Kong Open	A	2R	A		QF	W	2R	NH			2R	A		2R	W ('18)	
Syed Modi International	NH	A						NH		A	SF	A			SF ('23)	
BWF Superseries / World Tour Finals	DNQ				F	DNQ	SF	DNQ							F ('17)	
Chinese Taipei Masters	NH		SF	W	NH										W ('16)	
New Zealand Open	A	SF	F	W	A		SF	NH							W ('16)	
Scottish Open	A		W	A			N/A	NH	N/A	NH	N/A				W ('15)	
Year-end ranking	142	61	23	20	4	1	2	2	4	13	5	102	285		1	
Tournament	2013	2014	2015	2016	2017	2018	2019	2020	2021	2022	2023	2024	2025	2026	Best	Ref.

===== Mixed doubles =====
Tournament	BWF Superseries / Grand Prix			Best
Tournament	2015	2016	2017	Best
Australian Open	A		1R	1R ('17)
Korea Open	A		QF	QF ('17)
China Open	A		2R	2R ('17)
Japan Open	A		F	F ('17)
Denmark Open	A		2R	2R ('17)
Hong Kong Open	A		SF	SF ('17)
Chinese Taipei Masters	1R	A	NH	1R ('15)
Year-end ranking	734	1.159	38	32
Tournament	2015	2016	2017	Best
