= Badminton at the 2022 Asian Games – Women's doubles =

Women's doubles at the 2022 Asian Games
- Venue: Binjiang Gymnasium
- Dates: 2–7 October 2023

Medalists
gold medal	Chen Qingchen; Jia Yifan	China
silver medal	Baek Ha-na; Lee So-hee	South Korea
bronze medal	Yuki Fukushima; Sayaka Hirota	Japan
bronze medal	Kim So-yeong; Kong Hee-yong	South Korea

The badminton women's doubles tournament at the 2022 Asian Games in Hangzhou took place from 2 to 7 October 2023 at Binjiang Gymnasium.

== Schedule ==
All times are China Standard Time (UTC+08:00)

Date	Time	Event
Monday, 3 October 2023	10:00	Round of 32
Wednesday, 4 October 2023	10:00	Round of 16
Thursday, 5 October 2023	9:00	Quarter-finals
Friday, 6 October 2023	10:00	Semifinals
Saturday, 7 October 2023	18:15	Gold medal match

== Results ==
=== Seeds ===
1. Chen Qingchen / Jia Yifan (CHN) (champions)
2. Baek Ha-na / Lee So-hee (KOR) (final)
3. Kim So-yeong / Kong Hee-yong (KOR) (semi-finals)
4. Yuki Fukushima / Sayaka Hirota (JPN) (semi-finals)

=== Finals ===
Semi-finals
1	Chen Qingchen (CHN); Jia Yifan (CHN)	16	21	21
3	Kim So-yeong (KOR); Kong Hee-yong (KOR)	21	9	12
4	Yuki Fukushima (JPN); Sayaka Hirota (JPN)	14	12
2	Baek Ha-na (KOR); Lee So-hee (KOR)	21	21

Final
1	Chen Qingchen (CHN); Jia Yifan (CHN)	21	21
2	Baek Ha-na (KOR); Lee So-hee (KOR)	18	17

=== Top half ===
==== Section 1 ====
First round
F D Kusuma (INA); A C Pratiwi (INA)	21	21
R Maharjan (NEP); A Maya Rai (NEP)	3	7
Go P K (MAS); V Siow (MAS)	9	13
N Matsuyama (JPN); C Shida (JPN)	21	21

Second round
1	Chen QC (CHN); Jia YF (CHN)	21	21
F D Kusuma (INA); A C Pratiwi (INA)	5	17
B Aimsaard (THA); N Aimsaard (THA)	16	21
N Matsuyama (JPN); C Shida (JPN)	21	23

Quarter-finals
1	Chen QC (CHN); Jia YF (CHN)	21	21
N Matsuyama (JPN); C Shida (JPN)	17	18

==== Section 2 ====
First round
T Jolly (IND); G Gopichand (IND)	21	21
A N Abdul Razzaq (MDV); F B Abdul Razzaq (MDV)	14	12
K Baatar (MGL); A Munkhtsetseg (MGL)	3	5
Yeung N T (HKG); Yeung P L (HKG)	21	21
Ng W C (MAC); Pui C W (MAC)	17	9
Lee C-h (TPE); Teng C-h (TPE)	21	21

Second round
3	Kim S-y (KOR); Kong H-y (KOR)	21	18	21
T Jolly (IND); G Gopichand (IND)	15	21	13
Yeung N T (HKG); Yeung P L (HKG)	19	21	21
Lee C-h (TPE); Teng C-h (TPE)	21	15	19

Quarter-finals
3	Kim S-y (KOR); Kong H-y (KOR)	21	16	21
Yeung N T (HKG); Yeung P L (HKG)	8	21	9

=== Bottom half ===
==== Section 3 ====
First round
K Darkhanbaatar (MGL); G Myagmartseren (MGL)	1	4
Zhang SX (CHN); Zheng Y (CHN)	21	21
T Crasto (IND); A Ponnappa (IND)	21	12
M F Ismail (MDV); A A Rasheed (MDV)	2	2
Lui L L (HKG); Ng W Y (HKG)	14	14
A Rahayu (INA); S F S Ramadhanti (INA)	21	21

Second round
Zhang SX (CHN); Zheng Y (CHN)	21	23
T Crasto (IND); A Ponnappa (IND)	13	21
A Rahayu (INA); S F S Ramadhanti (INA)	3^{r}
4	Y Fukushima (JPN); S Hirota (JPN)	15

Quarter-finals
Zhang SX (CHN); Zheng Y (CHN)	22	21	21
4	Y Fukushima (JPN); S Hirota (JPN)	24	17	23

==== Section 4 ====
First round
Jin YJ (SGP); C Wong (SGP)	12	16
P Tan (MAS); Thinaah M (MAS)	21	21
J Kititharakul (THA); R Prajongjai (THA)	21	21
M Shahzad (PAK); G Siddique (PAK)	5	7
N Lamsal (NEP); N Tamang (NEP)	1	5
Hsu Y-c (TPE); Lin W-c (TPE)	21	21

Second round
P Tan (MAS); Thinaah M (MAS)	21	21
J Kititharakul (THA); R Prajongjai (THA)	15	17
Hsu Y-c (TPE); Lin W-c (TPE)	16	7
2	Baek H-n (KOR); Lee S-h (KOR)	21	21

Quarter-finals
P Tan (MAS); Thinaah M (MAS)	21	11	7
2	Baek H-n (KOR); Lee S-h (KOR)	15	21	21
