= Yuki Fukushima =

Japanese badminton player

Yūki Fukushima
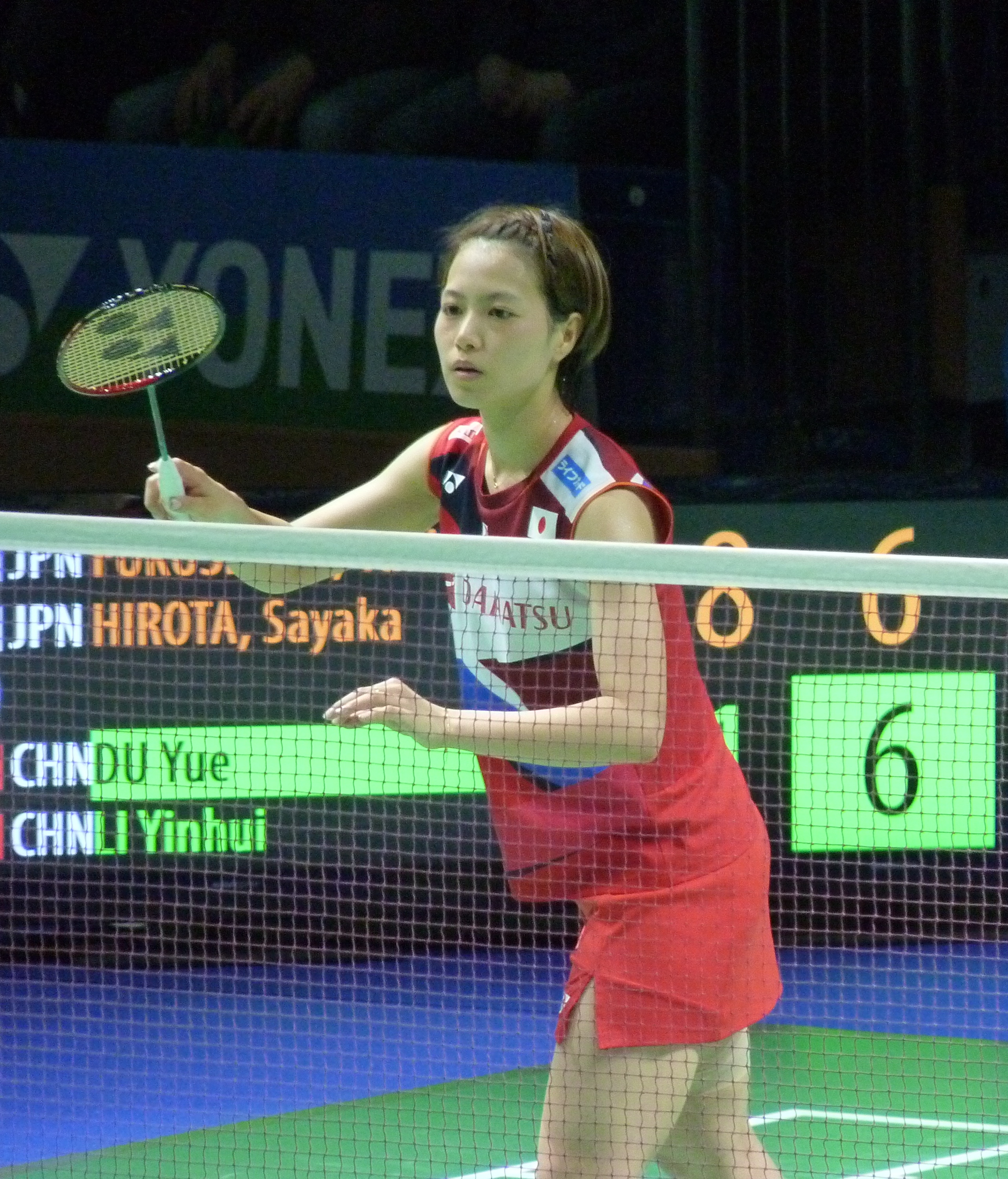

Personal information
- Born: 6 May 1993 (age 33) Yatsushiro, Kumamoto, Japan
- Height: 1.64 m (5 ft 5 in)

Sport
- Country: Japan
- Sport: Badminton
- Handedness: Right
- Coached by: Kei Nakashima; Mizuki Fujii

Women's doubles
- Highest ranking: 1 (with Sayaka Hirota, 21 June 2018)
- Current ranking: 3 (with Mayu Matsumoto, 6 October 2026)
- BWF profile
Medal record
Women's badminton
Representing Japan
World Championships
Silver medal – second place	2017 Glasgow	Women's doubles
Silver medal – second place	2018 Nanjing	Women's doubles
Silver medal – second place	2019 Basel	Women's doubles
Sudirman Cup
Silver medal – second place	2019 Nanning	Mixed team
Bronze medal – third place	2023 Suzhou	Mixed team
Uber Cup
Gold medal – first place	2018 Bangkok	Women's team
Silver medal – second place	2020 Aarhus	Women's team
Bronze medal – third place	2022 Bangkok	Women's team
Bronze medal – third place	2026 Horsens	Women's team
Asian Games
Gold medal – first place	2018 Jakarta–Palembang	Women's team
Silver medal – second place	2026 Aichi–Nagoya	Women's team
Bronze medal – third place	2018 Jakarta–Palembang	Women's doubles
Bronze medal – third place	2022 Hangzhou	Women's doubles
Bronze medal – third place	2022 Hangzhou	Women's team
Asian Championships
Gold medal – first place	2018 Wuhan	Women's doubles
Gold medal – first place	2023 Dubai	Women's doubles
Bronze medal – third place	2019 Wuhan	Women's doubles
Bronze medal – third place	2022 Manila	Women's doubles
Bronze medal – third place	2026 Ningbo	Women's doubles
Asia Team Championships
Gold medal – first place	2018 Alor Setar	Women's team
Gold medal – first place	2020 Manila	Women's team

Yuki Fukushima (福島由紀, Fukushima Yūki; born 6 May 1993) is a Japanese badminton player affiliated with Gifu Bluvic. She reached the World No. 1 ranking in women's doubles with her former partner Sayaka Hirota, and is a two-time Asian Champion. She has secured three silver medals at the BWF World Championships and two bronze medals at the Asian Games. Fukushima received the 2017 Most Improved Player of the Year award from the Badminton World Federation.

Fukushima has contributed to several historic victories of the Japanese national team. Her performance helped Japan win the 2018 Uber Cup. Her tenure with the national squad also yielded a gold medal at the 2018 Asian Games, as well as consecutive titles at the Asian Women's Team Championships in 2018 and 2020. She and Hirota ended their partnership in 2024.

== Career ==
=== Early career ===
Fukushima began playing badminton in the third grade of elementary school, initially training at the club in Yatsushiro City Sakamoto Junior High School. She later attended Aomori Yamada High School in northern Japan, where she led her team to victory in the 2011 Inter-High School Championships in both women's doubles and the team event.

In 2011, she was selected for the U-19 Japan badminton team, and participated in the World Junior Championships in Taiwan, reaching the quarter-finals in both girls' singles and girls' doubles with her high school partner Naru Shinoya. Though she initially competed in singles—reaching the semi-finals of the 2011 Osaka International—her career shifted toward doubles after joining the Renesas (now Saishunkan) corporate team in 2012. She reached the final of the 2012 Singapore International and won both the women's singles and women's doubles titles at the Sydney International alongside Sayaka Hirota, marking the beginning of their partnership.

=== 2015–2017: World Championships silver medalists ===
Between 2015 and 2016, Fukushima and Hirota built the foundation for their later international success. They finished as runners-up at the 2015 Osaka International and the New Zealand Open before winning their first Grand Prix title at the Scottish Open. In 2016, Fukushima partnered Chiharu Shida for a period, winning the Vietnam International and finishing runner-up at the Spanish International. She and Hirota then reunited to win the 2016 New Zealand Open and the Chinese Taipei Masters.

Fukushima and Hirota's breakthrough came in 2017. The pair won their first title of the year at the German Open, then claimed their first Superseries title at the Malaysia Open, defeating China's Huang Yaqiong and Tang Jinhua. They went on to reach the final of the 2017 BWF World Championships in Glasgow, where they won the silver medal. The Badminton World Federation named the pair Most Improved Player of the Year for 2017, and they closed the season as runners-up at the Dubai World Superseries Finals.

=== 2018: 2nd World Championships silver medal, Asian champions, and world #1 ===
Fukushima and Hirota reached the World No. 1 ranking in women's doubles on 21 June 2018. During the year they won the Asian Championships along with BWF World Tour titles at the German, Indonesia, Japan, Denmark, and Hong Kong Opens. They also finished as runners-up at the All England and Korea Opens, and won the silver medal at the 2018 BWF World Championships. Fukushima and Hirota were the only pairing that year to reach the finals of the Uber Cup, the Asian Games team event, and the BWF World Championships.

Fukushima helped Japan win gold at the 2018 Asia Women's Team Championships in Alor Setar. Japan went on to win the Uber Cup in Bangkok, ending a 37-year title drought. Fukushima closed the year with a gold medal in the women's team event and a bronze medal in women's doubles at the 2018 Asian Games in Jakarta. Her results that year earned her a nomination for the BWF Female Player of the Year.

=== 2019: 3rd World Championships silver medal, 2nd Indonesia Open title ===
Fukushima and Hirota won four BWF World Tour titles: the Malaysia Masters, Australian Open, Indonesia Open, and Fuzhou China Open. At the Australian Open they ended a 19-match winning streak held by China’s Chen Qingchen and Jia Yifan against non-Chinese opponents. The Indonesia Open marked their second successive title at the tournament.

They also advanced to the semifinals of the German, All England, Singapore, and China Opens, the Denmark and French Opens, the World Tour Finals, and took bronze at the Asian Championships. At the BWF World Championships they won a third consecutive silver medal. The pair received a nomination for the 2019 BWF Female Player of the Year.

=== 2020–2022: All England champion, regain world #1, and Olympic Spirit ===
Fukushima and Hirota began 2020 by contributing to Japan’s successful defence of the title at the Asian Women’s Team Championships in Manila. In the final against South Korea they secured a decisive point with a straight-games win over Lee So-hee and Shin Seung-chan. They then won the 2020 All England Open, defeating China’s Du Yue and Li Yinhui in the final. The COVID-19 pandemic severely disrupted the BWF World Tour. In the limited schedule that remained, Fukushima and Hirota won the 2020 Denmark Open and retained the world No. 1 ranking.

In early 2021, they reached the final of the All England Open for a second consecutive year, finishing runners-up to compatriots Matsumoto and Nagahara. Ahead of the Tokyo 2020 Olympics, Hirota suffered an ACL injury; she competed at the Games with a knee brace, and the pair reached the quarter-finals. They remained part of the Japanese national team at the 2020 Uber Cup (held in 2021), which Japan lost in the final to China to finish with the silver medal. In 2022, they helped Japan win the bronze medal at the Uber Cup in Bangkok, and reached the final of the Indonesia Open, where they lost a three-game match to Nami Matsuyama and Chiharu Shida. They also won a bronze medal at the Asian Championships.

=== 2023–2024: The final years of Fuku-hiro ===
In 2023, Fukushima and Hirota won the gold medal at the Asian Championships in Dubai. They reached the finals of the Indonesia Masters, Indonesia Open, China Masters, and Swiss Open — where Fukushima suffered a minor injury. She also competed at the Sudirman Cup, where Japan finished with the bronze medal after reaching the semifinals, and won bronze medals in both the women’s doubles and women’s team events at the Asian Games in Hangzhou. In December, Hirota tore the anterior cruciate ligament in her left knee during the semifinals of the Syed Modi International.

Hirota postponed surgery in an effort to secure qualification for the 2024 Paris Olympics. The pair returned to competition in March 2024 at the French Open and All England Open, with Hirota wearing a knee brace. They reached the quarterfinals of the All England Open, but the injury prevented them from qualifying for the Olympics. The partnership ended in September 2024. Fukushima subsequently formed a new partnership with Mayu Matsumoto, and the pair finished as runners-up at the Japan Masters in Kumamoto.

=== 2025 ===
Fukushima continued her partnership with Mayu Matsumoto, which became known as “Fuku-matsu.” The pair won the Malaysia Open in January, defeating China’s Jia Yifan and Zhang Shuxian in the final. They later reached the final of the All England Open, finishing as runners-up to compatriots Nami Matsuyama and Chiharu Shida.

During the season, Fukushima and Matsumoto advanced to the semifinals of the Orléans Masters, Korea Open, Denmark Open, and Japan Masters. In October they won the French Open, defeating China’s Li Yijing and Luo Xumin in the final.

At the World Tour Finals in Hangzhou, the pair progressed from the group stage and defeated Malaysia’s Pearly Tan and Thinaah Muralitharan in the semifinals before finishing as runners-up to South Korea’s Baek Ha-na and Lee So-hee. They closed the year ranked fifth in the world.

=== 2026 ===
Fukushima and Matsumoto opened the year by reaching the final of the India Open, finishing as runners-up to China’s Liu Shengshu and Tan Ning. They later reached the semifinals of the Malaysia Open and the quarter-finals of the All England Open. At the Asian Championships in Ningbo, the pair took the bronze medal after a semifinal loss to China’s Li Yijing and Luo Xumin.

In June, Fukushima and Matsumoto won the Super 1000 Indonesia Open, defeating the world No. 1 pair Liu Shengshu and Tan Ning in the final. They also reached the final of the China Open, again finishing as runners-up to Liu and Tan. Fukushima helped Japan win silver in the women’s team event at the Asian Games; in the individual event, she and Matsumoto exited in the second round. Japan also finished with bronze at the Uber Cup.

In October, Fukushima and Matsumoto defended their title at the French Open, defeating Malaysia’s Pearly Tan and Thinaah Muralitharan in the final. The result gave them their second consecutive French Open title and their second World Tour title of the season.

== Awards and nominations ==
Award	Year	Category	Result	Ref.
BWF Awards	2017	Most Improved Player of the Year with Sayaka Hirota	Won	
BWF Awards	2018	Female Player of the Year with Sayaka Hirota	Nominated	
BWF Awards	2019	Female Player of the Year with Sayaka Hirota	Nominated	

== Achievements ==
=== World Championships ===
Women's doubles
Year	Venue	Partner	Opponent	Score	Result	Ref.
2017	Emirates Arena, Glasgow, Scotland	(Japan) Sayaka Hirota	(China) Chen Qingchen (China) Jia Yifan	18–21, 21–17, 15–21	Silver	
2018	Nanjing Youth Olympic Sports Park, Nanjing, China	(Japan) Sayaka Hirota	(Japan) Mayu Matsumoto (Japan) Wakana Nagahara	21–19, 19–21, 20–22	Silver	
2019	St. Jakobshalle, Basel, Switzerland	(Japan) Sayaka Hirota	(Japan) Mayu Matsumoto (Japan) Wakana Nagahara	11–21, 22–20, 21–23	Silver	

=== Asian Games ===
Women's doubles
Year	Venue	Partner	Opponent	Score	Result	Ref.
2018	Istora Gelora Bung Karno, Jakarta, Indonesia	(Japan) Sayaka Hirota	(China) Chen Qingchen (China) Jia Yifan	17–21, 8–21	Bronze	
2022	Binjiang Gymnasium, Hangzhou, China	(Japan) Sayaka Hirota	(South Korea) Baek Ha-na (South Korea) Lee So-hee	14–21, 12–21	Bronze	

=== Asian Championships ===
Women's doubles
Year	Venue	Partner	Opponent	Score	Result	Ref.
2018	Wuhan Sports Center Gymnasium, Wuhan, China	(Japan) Sayaka Hirota	(Japan) Misaki Matsutomo (Japan) Ayaka Takahashi	21–18, 18–21, 21–15	Gold	
2019	Wuhan Sports Center Gymnasium, Wuhan, China	(Japan) Sayaka Hirota	(Japan) Mayu Matsumoto (Japan) Wakana Nagahara	16–21, 24–26	Bronze	
2022	Muntinlupa Sports Complex, Metro Manila, Philippines	(Japan) Sayaka Hirota	(Japan) Rin Iwanaga (Japan) Kie Nakanishi	21–16, 15–21, 19–21	Bronze	
2023	Sheikh Rashid Bin Hamdan Indoor Hall, Dubai, United Arab Emirates	(Japan) Sayaka Hirota	(South Korea) Baek Ha-na (South Korea) Lee So-hee	21–7, 21–14	Gold	
2026	Ningbo Olympic Sports Center Gymnasium, Ningbo, China	(Japan) Mayu Matsumoto	(China) Li Yijing (China) Luo Xumin	17–21, 17–21	Bronze	

=== BWF World Tour (15 titles, 13 runners-up) ===
The BWF World Tour, which was announced on 19 March 2017 and implemented in 2018, is a series of elite badminton tournaments sanctioned by the Badminton World Federation (BWF). The BWF World Tour is divided into levels of World Tour Finals, Super 1000, Super 750, Super 500, Super 300, and the BWF Tour Super 100.

Women's doubles
Year	Tournament	Level	Partner	Opponent	Score	Result	Ref.
2018	German Open	Super 300	(Japan) Sayaka Hirota	(China) Huang Dongping (China) Zheng Yu	18–21, 21–14, 21–6	(gold) Winner	
2018	All England Open	Super 1000	(Japan) Sayaka Hirota	(Denmark) Christinna Pedersen (Denmark) Kamilla Rytter Juhl	19–21, 18–21	(silver) Runner-up	
2018	Indonesia Open	Super 1000	(Japan) Sayaka Hirota	(Japan) Mayu Matsumoto (Japan) Wakana Nagahara	21–14, 16–21, 21–14	(gold) Winner	
2018	Japan Open	Super 750	(Japan) Sayaka Hirota	(China) Chen Qingchen (China) Jia Yifan	21–15, 21–12	(gold) Winner	
2018	Korea Open	Super 500	(Japan) Sayaka Hirota	(Japan) Misaki Matsutomo (Japan) Ayaka Takahashi	11–21, 18–21	(silver) Runner-up	
2018	Denmark Open	Super 750	(Japan) Sayaka Hirota	(Japan) Shiho Tanaka (Japan) Koharu Yonemoto	21–19, 21–16	(gold) Winner	
2018	Hong Kong Open	Super 500	(Japan) Sayaka Hirota	(South Korea) Lee So-hee (South Korea) Shin Seung-chan	21–18, 21–17	(gold) Winner	
2019	Malaysia Masters	Super 500	(Japan) Sayaka Hirota	(Indonesia) Greysia Polii (Indonesia) Apriyani Rahayu	18–21, 21–16, 21–16	(gold) Winner	
2019	Australian Open	Super 300	(Japan) Sayaka Hirota	(China) Chen Qingchen (China) Jia Yifan	21–10, 21–16	(gold) Winner	
2019	Indonesia Open	Super 1000	(Japan) Sayaka Hirota	(Japan) Misaki Matsutomo (Japan) Ayaka Takahashi	21–16, 21–18	(gold) Winner	
2019	Fuzhou China Open	Super 750	(Japan) Sayaka Hirota	(South Korea) Lee So-hee (South Korea) Shin Seung-chan	21–17, 21–15	(gold) Winner	
2020	All England Open	Super 1000	(Japan) Sayaka Hirota	(China) Du Yue (China) Li Yinhui	21–13, 21–15	(gold) Winner	
2020	Denmark Open	Super 750	(Japan) Sayaka Hirota	(Japan) Mayu Matsumoto (Japan) Wakana Nagahara	21–10, 16–21, 21–18	(gold) Winner	
2021	All England Open	Super 1000	(Japan) Sayaka Hirota	(Japan) Mayu Matsumoto (Japan) Wakana Nagahara	18–21, 16–21	(silver) Runner-up	
2022	Indonesia Open	Super 1000	(Japan) Sayaka Hirota	(Japan) Nami Matsuyama (Japan) Chiharu Shida	21–18, 14–21, 17–21	(silver) Runner-up	
2023	Indonesia Masters	Super 500	(Japan) Sayaka Hirota	(China) Liu Shengshu (China) Zhang Shuxian	20–22, 19–21	(silver) Runner-up	
2023	Swiss Open	Super 300	(Japan) Sayaka Hirota	(Japan) Rena Miyaura (Japan) Ayako Sakuramoto	Walkover	(silver) Runner-up	
2023	Indonesia Open	Super 1000	(Japan) Sayaka Hirota	(South Korea) Baek Ha-na (South Korea) Lee So-hee	20–22, 10–21	(silver) Runner-up	
2023	China Masters	Super 750	(Japan) Sayaka Hirota	(Japan) Nami Matsuyama (Japan) Chiharu Shida	18–21, 11–21	(silver) Runner-up	
2024	Kumamoto Masters	Super 500	(Japan) Mayu Matsumoto	(China) Liu Shengshu (China) Tan Ning	15–21, 5–21	(silver) Runner-up	
2025	Malaysia Open	Super 1000	(Japan) Mayu Matsumoto	(China) Jia Yifan (China) Zhang Shuxian	17–21, 21–15, 21–15	(gold) Winner	
2025	All England Open	Super 1000	(Japan) Mayu Matsumoto	(Japan) Nami Matsuyama (Japan) Chiharu Shida	16–21, 21–14, 17–21	(silver) Runner-up	
2025	French Open	Super 750	(Japan) Mayu Matsumoto	(China) Li Yijing (China) Luo Xumin	17–21, 21–18, 21–15	(gold) Winner	
2025	BWF World Tour Finals	World Tour Finals	(Japan) Mayu Matsumoto	(South Korea) Baek Ha-na (South Korea) Lee So-hee	17–21, 11–21	(silver) Runner-up	
2026	India Open	Super 750	(Japan) Mayu Matsumoto	(China) Liu Shengshu (China) Tan Ning	11–21, 18–21	(silver) Runner-up	
2026	Indonesia Open	Super 1000	(Japan) Mayu Matsumoto	(China) Liu Shengshu (China) Tan Ning	21–15, 18–21, 21–18	(gold) Winner	
2026	China Open	Super 1000	(Japan) Mayu Matsumoto	(China) Liu Shengshu (China) Tan Ning	14–21, 19–21	(silver) Runner-up	
2026	French Open	Super 750	(Japan) Mayu Matsumoto	(Malaysia) Pearly Tan (Malaysia) Thinaah Muralitharan	10–21, 21–17, 21–16	(gold) Winner	

=== BWF Superseries (1 title, 1 runner-up) ===
The BWF Superseries, which was launched on 14 December 2006 and implemented in 2007, was a series of elite badminton tournaments, sanctioned by the Badminton World Federation (BWF). BWF Superseries levels were Superseries and Superseries Premier. A season of Superseries consisted of twelve tournaments around the world that had been introduced since 2011. Successful players were invited to the Superseries Finals, which were held at the end of each year.

Women's doubles
Year	Tournament	Partner	Opponent	Score	Result	Ref.
2017	Malaysia Open	(Japan) Sayaka Hirota	(China) Huang Yaqiong (China) Tang Jinhua	21–17, 18–21, 21–12	(gold) Winner	
2017	Dubai World Superseries Finals	(Japan) Sayaka Hirota	(Japan) Shiho Tanaka (Japan) Koharu Yonemoto	16–21, 15–21	(silver) Runner-up	

BWF Super Series Finals tournament
BWF Super Series Premier tournament

=== BWF Grand Prix (4 titles, 1 runner-up) ===
The BWF Grand Prix had two levels, the Grand Prix and Grand Prix Gold. It was a series of badminton tournaments sanctioned by the Badminton World Federation (BWF) and played between 2007 and 2017.

Women's doubles
Year	Tournament	Partner	Opponent	Score	Result	Ref.
2015	New Zealand Open	(Japan) Sayaka Hirota	(China) Xia Huan (China) Zhong Qianxin	21–17, 22–24, 19–21	(silver) Runner-up	
2015	Scottish Open	(Japan) Sayaka Hirota	(Netherlands) Samantha Barning (Netherlands) Iris Tabeling	21–14, 14–11 retired	(gold) Winner	
2016	New Zealand Open	(Japan) Sayaka Hirota	(South Korea) Chang Ye-na (South Korea) Lee So-hee	21–13, 21–16	(gold) Winner	
2016	Chinese Taipei Masters	(Japan) Sayaka Hirota	(Japan) Shiho Tanaka (Japan) Koharu Yonemoto	11–10, 11–5, 11–7	(gold) Winner	
2017	German Open	(Japan) Sayaka Hirota	(China) Huang Dongping (China) Li Yinhui	15–21, 21–17, 21–15	(gold) Winner	

BWF Grand Prix Gold tournament
BWF Grand Prix tournament

=== BWF International Challenge/Series (3 titles, 3 runners-up) ===
Women's singles
Year	Tournament	Opponent	Score	Result	Ref.
2014	Sydney International	(Japan) Kana Ito	14–21, 21–13, 19–21	(gold) Winner	

Women's doubles
Year	Tournament	Partner	Opponent	Score	Result	Ref.
2012	Singapore International	(Japan) Yui Miyauchi	(Japan) Asumi Kugo (Japan) Megumi Yokoyama	21–12, 16–21, 17–21	(silver) Runner-up	
2014	Sydney International	(Japan) Sayaka Hirota	(Indonesia) Sylvina Kurniawan (Australia) Susan Wang	11–5, 11–5, 11–2	(gold) Winner	
2015	Osaka International	(Japan) Sayaka Hirota	(China) Chen Qingchen (China) Jia Yifan	17–21, 15–21	(silver) Runner-up	
2016	Vietnam International	(Japan) Chiharu Shida	(Japan) Shiho Tanaka (Japan) Koharu Yonemoto	28–26, 21–15	(gold) Winner	
2016	Spanish International	(Japan) Chiharu Shida	(Japan) Sayaka Hirota (Japan) Nao Ono	14–21, 21–13, 19–21	(silver) Runner-up	

BWF International Challenge tournament
BWF International Series tournament

== Performance timeline ==
Key

W	Won	F	Finalist	SF	Semi-finalist
QF	Quarter-finalist	#R	Rounds 4, 3, 2, 1	RR	Round-robin stage
Q#	Qualification round	A	Absent	w/d	Withdrew
G	Gold	S	Silver	B	Bronze
NH	Not held	N/A	Not applicable	DNQ	Did not qualify

=== National team ===
- Senior level

Team events	2018	2019	2020	2021	2022	2023	2024	2025	2026	Ref
Asia Team Championships	G	NH	G	NH	A	NH	A	NH	A	
Asian Games	G	NH			B	NH			S	
Uber Cup	G	NH	S	NH	B	NH	A	NH	B	
Sudirman Cup	NH	S	NH	A	NH	B	NH	A	NH	

=== Individual competitions ===
- Senior level

==== Women's singles ====
Tournament	BWF Superseries / Grand Prix				Best
Tournament	2012	2013	2014	2015	Best
Malaysia Masters	A		QF	A	QF ('14)
Japan Open	1R	A			1R ('12)
Scottish Open	A			QF	QF ('15)
Year-end ranking	262	427	189	334	163

==== Women's doubles ====
Event	2016	2017	2018	2019	2020	2021	2022	2023	2024	2025	2026	Ref
Asian Championships	2R	1R	G	B	NH		B	G	1R	2R	B	
Asian Games	NH		B	NH			B	NH			2R	
World Championships	NH	S	S	S	NH	A	w/d	QF	NH	3R	3R	
Olympic Games	DNQ	NH			QF	NH			DNQ	NH		

Tournament	BWF Superseries / Grand Prix						BWF World Tour									Best	Ref
Tournament	2012	2013	2014	2015	2016	2017	2018	2019	2020	2021	2022	2023	2024	2025	2026	Best	Ref
Malaysia Open	A					W	2R	QF	NH		w/d	1R	A	W	SF	W ('17, '25)	
India Open	A	2R	A		1R	SF	A		NH		A	2R	A	QF	F	F ('26)	
Indonesia Masters	2R	A				NH	A	1R	2R	A		F	A	QF	A	F ('23)	
Thailand Masters	NA				A					NH		A	1R	A		1R ('24)	
German Open	A				2R	W	W	SF	NH		A	QF	A			W ('17, '18)	
All England Open	A					QF	F	SF	W	F	1R	2R	QF	F	QF	W ('20)	
Swiss Open	A	1R	A						NH	A		F	A			F ('23)	
Orléans Masters	A								NH	A				SF	A	SF ('25)	
Thailand Open	A		NH	A			QF	2R	w/d	NH	QF	A				QF ('18, '22)	
Thailand Open	A		NH	A			QF	2R	w/d	NH	QF	A				QF ('18, '22)	
Malaysia Masters	SF	A	1R	1R	QF	A	SF	W	2R	NH	2R	QF	A			W ('19)	
Singapore Open	A				2R	1R	A	SF	NH		A	2R	A	2R	QF	SF ('19)	
Indonesia Open	A					QF	W	W	NH	A	F	F	A	QF	W	W ('18, '19, '26)	
Australian Open	A	QF	A			SF	A	W	NH		QF	SF	A			W ('19)	
Macau Open	2R	A		SF	A				NH				1R	A		SF ('15)	
U.S. Open	A				QF	A			NH			A				QF ('16)	
Canada Open	A								NH		A	SF	A			SF ('23)	
Japan Open	A	1R	1R	1R	2R	SF	W	QF	NH		w/d	SF	A	1R	SF	W ('18)	
China Open	A					QF	QF	SF	NH			QF	A	QF	F	F ('26)	
Chinese Taipei Open	A			2R	A				NH		A					2R ('15)	
Korea Masters	A	QF	QF	SF	1R	A			NH		A					SF ('15)	
China Masters	A				QF	A	2R	W	NH			F	SF	QF	w/d	W ('19)	
Denmark Open	A					2R	W	SF	W	2R	QF	1R	A	SF	2R	W ('18, '20)	
French Open	A					2R	2R	SF	NH	SF	SF	QF	2R	W	W	W ('25, '26)	
Korea Open	A					2R	F	2R	NH		A	2R	A	SF	w/d	F ('18)	
Japan Masters	NH											1R	F	SF	2R	F ('24)	
Hong Kong Open	A		2R	A		QF	W	2R	NH			2R	A		Q	W ('18)	
Syed Modi International	A	NH	A						NH		A	SF	A			SF ('23)	
Superseries / World Tour Finals	DNQ					F	DNQ	SF	DNQ					F	Q	F ('17, '25)	
Vietnam Open	A				2R	A			NH		A					2R ('16)	
Chinese Taipei Masters	NH			SF	W	NH										W ('16)	
New Zealand Open	NH	2R	SF	F	W	A		SF	NH							W ('16)	
Scottish Open	A			W	A			N/A	NH	N/A	NH	N/A				W ('15)	
Year-end ranking	77	84	61	23	20	4	1	2	2	4	13	5	93	5		1	
Tournament	2012	2013	2014	2015	2016	2017	2018	2019	2020	2021	2022	2023	2024	2025	2026	Best	Ref

==== Mixed doubles ====
Tournament	BWF Superseries / Grand Prix			Best
Tournament	2014	2015	2016	Best
New Zealand Open	2R	A	QF	QF ('16)
Korea Masters	1R	2R	A	2R ('15)
Chinese Taipei Masters	NH	2R	A	2R ('15)
Year-end ranking	190	180	213	95
Tournament	2014	2015	2016	Best
