= Badminton at the 2018 Asian Games – Women's doubles =

Women's doubles at the 2018 Asian Games
- Venue: Istora Gelora Bung Karno
- Dates: 23–27 August
- Competitors: 52 from 15 nations

Medalists
gold medal	Chen Qingchen; Jia Yifan	China
silver medal	Misaki Matsutomo; Ayaka Takahashi	Japan
bronze medal	Yuki Fukushima; Sayaka Hirota	Japan
bronze medal	Greysia Polii; Apriyani Rahayu	Indonesia

The badminton women's doubles tournament at the 2018 Asian Games in Jakarta took place from 23 to 27 August at Istora Gelora Bung Karno.

== Schedule ==
All times are Western Indonesia Time (UTC+07:00)

Date	Time	Event
Thursday, 23 August 2018	12:00	Round of 32
Friday, 24 August 2018	15:00	Round of 16
Saturday, 25 August 2018	13:00	Quarterfinals
Sunday, 26 August 2018	17:30	Semifinals
Monday, 27 August 2018	18:00	Gold medal match

== Results ==
=== Final ===
Gold medal match
3	Chen Qingchen (CHN); Jia Yifan (CHN)	22	22
2	Misaki Matsutomo (JPN); Ayaka Takahashi (JPN)	20	20

=== Top half ===
Round of 32
Della Destiara Haris (INA); Rizki Amelia Pradipta (INA)	21	21
Aminath Nabeeha Abdul Razzaq (MDV); Fathimath Nabaaha Abdul Razzaq (MDV)	6	4
Sehra Akram (PAK); Mahoor Shahzad (PAK)	3	6
Lee So-hee (KOR); Shin Seung-chan (KOR)	21	21
Jessica Gurung (NEP); Nangsal Tamang (NEP)	7	5
Jongkolphan Kititharakul (THA); Rawinda Prajongjai (THA)	21	21
Ng Wing Yung (HKG); Yeung Nga Ting (HKG)	16	15
Ashwini Ponnappa (IND); N. Sikki Reddy (IND)	21	21
Chow Mei Kuan (MAS); Lee Meng Yean (MAS)	21	21
Chen Hsiao-huan (TPE); Hu Ling-fang (TPE)	13	14

Round of 16
1	Yuki Fukushima (JPN); Sayaka Hirota (JPN)	21	21
Della Destiara Haris (INA); Rizki Amelia Pradipta (INA)	13	17
Rana Abu-Harbesh (KSA); Shatha Al-Mutairi (KSA)	4	7
Lee So-hee (KOR); Shin Seung-chan (KOR)	21	21
3	Chen Qingchen (CHN); Jia Yifan (CHN)	21	21
Jongkolphan Kititharakul (THA); Rawinda Prajongjai (THA)	15	17
Ashwini Ponnappa (IND); N. Sikki Reddy (IND)	21	16	21
Chow Mei Kuan (MAS); Lee Meng Yean (MAS)	17	21	19

Quarterfinals
1	Yuki Fukushima (JPN); Sayaka Hirota (JPN)	21	21
Lee So-hee (KOR); Shin Seung-chan (KOR)	13	17
3	Chen Qingchen (CHN); Jia Yifan (CHN)	21	24
Ashwini Ponnappa (IND); N. Sikki Reddy (IND)	11	22

Semifinals
1	Yuki Fukushima (JPN); Sayaka Hirota (JPN)	17	8
3	Chen Qingchen (CHN); Jia Yifan (CHN)	21	21

=== Bottom half ===
Round of 32
Gong Xue Xin (MAC); Ng Weng Chi (MAC)	5	12
Hsu Ya-ching (TPE); Wu Ti-jung (TPE)	21	21
Thilini Hendahewa (SRI); Kavidi Sirimannage (SRI)	13	12
Tang Jinhua (CHN); Zheng Yu (CHN)	21	21
Rutaparna Panda (IND); Arathi Sara Sunil (IND)	11	6
Chayanit Chaladchalam (THA); Phataimas Muenwong (THA)	21	21
Ng Tsz Yau (HKG); Yuen Sin Ying (HKG)	10	17
Kim Hye-rin (KOR); Kong Hee-yong (KOR)	21	21
Ghazala Saddique (PAK); Saima Waqas (PAK)	22	18	21
Neela Najeeb (MDV); Aminath Shahurunaaz Moosa (MDV)	20	21	15

Round of 16
Hsu Ya-ching (TPE); Wu Ti-jung (TPE)	17	14
Tang Jinhua (CHN); Zheng Yu (CHN)	21	21
Chayanit Chaladchalam (THA); Phataimas Muenwong (THA)	12	9
4	Greysia Polii (INA); Apriyani Rahayu (INA)	21	21
Kim Hye-rin (KOR); Kong Hee-yong (KOR)	21	21
Amita Giri (NEP); Rasila Maharjan (NEP)	7	1
Ghazala Saddique (PAK); Saima Waqas (PAK)	3	3
2	Misaki Matsutomo (JPN); Ayaka Takahashi (JPN)	21	21

Quarterfinals
Tang Jinhua (CHN); Zheng Yu (CHN)	21	22	16
4	Greysia Polii (INA); Apriyani Rahayu (INA)	18	24	21
Kim Hye-rin (KOR); Kong Hee-yong (KOR)	10	7
2	Misaki Matsutomo (JPN); Ayaka Takahashi (JPN)	21	21

Semifinals
4	Greysia Polii (INA); Apriyani Rahayu (INA)	15	17
2	Misaki Matsutomo (JPN); Ayaka Takahashi (JPN)	21	21
