= Badminton at the 2022 Asian Games – Women's team =

Women's event at the 2022 Asian Games

Women's team at the 2022 Asian Games
- Venue: Binjiang Gymnasium, Hangzhou, China
- Dates: 28 September – 1 October 2023

Medalists
gold medal	South Korea; An Se-young, Baek Ha-na, Chae Yoo-jung, Jeong Na-eun, Kim Ga-eun, Kim Ga-ram, Kim Hye-jeong, Kim So-yeong, Kong Hee-yong, Lee So-hee
silver medal	China; Chen Qingchen, Chen Yufei, Han Yue, He Bingjiao, Huang Dongping, Huang Yaqiong, Jia Yifan, Wang Zhiyi, Zhang Shuxian, Zheng Yu
bronze medal	Japan; Yuki Fukushima, Arisa Higashino, Sayaka Hirota, Saena Kawakami, Nami Matsuyama, Natsuki Nidaira, Aya Ohori, Chiharu Shida, Naru Shinoya, Akane Yamaguchi
bronze medal	Thailand; Benyapa Aimsaard, Nuntakarn Aimsaard, Pornpawee Chochuwong, Ratchanok Intanon, Supanida Katethong, Jongkolphan Kititharakul, Busanan Ongbamrungphan, Supissara Paewsampran, Rawinda Prajongjai, Sapsiree Taerattanachai

The badminton women's team tournament at the 2022 Asian Games took place from 28 September to 1 October 2023 at Binjiang Gymnasium in Hangzhou, China. The draw for the team event was held on 27 September.

== Schedule ==
All times are China Standard Time (UTC+08:00)

Date	Time	Event
Thursday, 28 September 2023	09:00	Round of 16
Friday, 29 September 2023	09:00	Quarterfinals
Saturday, 30 September 2023	09:00	Semifinals
Sunday, 1 October 2023	09:00	Gold medal match

== Results ==
Legend

- WO — Won by walkover

Round of 16
Hong Kong	0
Chinese Taipei	3
India	3
Mongolia	0
Nepal	1
Maldives	3

Quarter-finals
1	China	3
Indonesia	0
3	Japan	3
Chinese Taipei	1
India	0
4	Thailand	3
Maldives	0
2	South Korea	3

Semi-finals
1	China	3
3	Japan	1
4	Thailand	1
2	South Korea	3

Gold medal match
1	China	0
2	South Korea	3

=== Round of 16 ===
Hong Kong
0
Binjiang Gymnasium, Court 1
September 28, 2023, 9:00 UTC+8

Chinese Taipei
3

			1	2	3
1	(Hong Kong) (Chinese Taipei)	Lo Sin Yan; Tai Tzu-ying	19; 21	17; 21
2	(Hong Kong) (Chinese Taipei)	Yeung Nga Ting / Yeung Pui Lam; Lee Chia-hsin / Teng Chun-hsun	21; 23	18; 21
3	(Hong Kong) (Chinese Taipei)	Saloni Samirbhai Mehta; Hsu Wen-chi	15; 21	11; 21
4	(Hong Kong) (Chinese Taipei)	Lui Lok Lok / Ng Wing Yung; Hsu Ya-ching / Lin Wan-ching				not played
5	(Hong Kong) (Chinese Taipei)	Liang Ka Wing; Sung Shuo-yun				not played

India
3
Binjiang Gymnasium, Court 2
September 28, 2023, 9:00 UTC+8

Mongolia
0

			1	2	3
1	(India) (Mongolia)	P. V. Sindhu; Ganbaatar Myagmartseren	21; 2	21; 3
2	(India) (Mongolia)	Ashmita Chaliha; Kherlen Darkhanbaatar	21; 2	21; 3
3	(India) (Mongolia)	Anupama Upadhyaya; Khulangoo Baatar	21; 0	21; 2
4	(India) (Mongolia)	Treesa Jolly / Gayatri Gopichand; Kherlen Darkhanbaatar / Ganbaatar Myagmartseren				not played
5	(India) (Mongolia)	Tanisha Crasto / Ashwini Ponnappa; Khulangoo Baatar / Altangerel Munkhtsetseg				not played

Nepal
1
Binjiang Gymnasium, Court 3
September 28, 2023, 9:00 UTC+8

Maldives
3

			1	2	3
1	(Nepal) (Maldives)	Rasila Maharjan; Fathimath Nabaaha Abdul Razzaq	22; 24	21; 19	13; 21
2	(Nepal) (Maldives)	Nangsal Tamang; Aminath Nabeeha Abdul Razzaq	16; 21	10; 21
3	(Nepal) (Maldives)	Anu Maya Rai; Aishath Afnaan Rasheed	21; 9	21; 11
4	(Nepal) (Maldives)	Rasila Maharjan / Anu Maya Rai; Aminath Nabeeha Abdul Razzaq / Fathimath Nabaaha Abdul Razzaq	13; 21	19; 21
5	(Nepal) (Maldives)	Nita Lamsal / Nangsal Tamang; Maisa Fathuhulla Ismail / Aishath Afnaan Rasheed				not played

=== Quarter-finals ===
China
3
Binjiang Gymnasium, Court 1
September 29, 2023, 9:00 UTC+8

Indonesia
0

			1	2	3
1	(China) (Indonesia)	Chen Yufei; Gregoria Mariska Tunjung	21; 14	21; 12
2	(China) (Indonesia)	Chen Qingchen / Jia Yifan; Apriyani Rahayu / Siti Fadia Silva Ramadhanti	21; 12	19; 21	22; 20
3	(China) (Indonesia)	He Bingjiao; Putri Kusuma Wardani	21; 15	21; 19
4	(China) (Indonesia)	Zhang Shuxian / Zheng Yu; Febriana Dwipuji Kusuma / Amallia Cahaya Pratiwi				not played
5	(China) (Indonesia)	Han Yue; Ester Nurumi Tri Wardoyo				not played

Japan
3
Binjiang Gymnasium, Court 2
September 29, 2023, 9:00 UTC+8

Chinese Taipei
1

			1	2	3
1	(Japan) (Chinese Taipei)	Akane Yamaguchi; Tai Tzu-ying	14; 21	7; 5		retired
2	(Japan) (Chinese Taipei)	Nami Matsuyama / Chiharu Shida; Lee Chia-hsin / Lin Wan-ching	21; 11	21; 12
3	(Japan) (Chinese Taipei)	Aya Ohori; Hsu Wen-chi	21; 11	21; 14
4	(Japan) (Chinese Taipei)	Yuki Fukushima / Arisa Higashino; Hsu Ya-ching / Teng Chun-hsun	21; 18	21; 11
5	(Japan) (Chinese Taipei)	Natsuki Nidaira; Sung Shuo-yun				not played

India
0
Binjiang Gymnasium, Court 4
September 29, 2023, 9:00 UTC+8

Thailand
3

			1	2	3
1	(India) (Thailand)	P. V. Sindhu; Pornpawee Chochuwong	21; 14	15; 21	14; 21
2	(India) (Thailand)	Treesa Jolly / Gayatri Gopichand; Jongkolphan Kititharakul / Rawinda Prajongjai	19; 21	5; 21
3	(India) (Thailand)	Ashmita Chaliha; Busanan Ongbamrungphan	9; 21	16; 21
4	(India) (Thailand)	Tanisha Crasto / Ashwini Ponnappa; Benyapa Aimsaard / Nuntakarn Aimsaard				not played
5	(India) (Thailand)	Anupama Upadhyaya; Supanida Katethong				not played

Maldives
0
Binjiang Gymnasium, Court 3
September 29, 2023, 9:00 UTC+8

South Korea
3

			1	2	3
1	(Maldives) (South Korea)	Fathimath Nabaaha Abdul Razzaq; An Se-young	1; 21	5; 21
2	(Maldives) (South Korea)	Aminath Nabeeha Abdul Razzaq; Kim Ga-eun	7; 21	4; 21
3	(Maldives) (South Korea)	Aishath Afnaan Rasheed; Kim Ga-ram	3; 21	1; 21
4	(Maldives) (South Korea)	Aminath Nabeeha Abdul Razzaq / Fathimath Nabaaha Abdul Razzaq; Jeong Na-eun / Kim Hye-jeong				not played
5	(Maldives) (South Korea)	Maisa Fathuhulla Ismail / Aishath Afnaan Rasheed; Chae Yoo-jung / Kong Hee-yong				not played

=== Semi-finals ===
China
3
Binjiang Gymnasium, Court 1
September 30, 2023, 9:00 UTC+8

Japan
1

			1	2	3
1	(China) (Japan)	Chen Yufei; Aya Ohori	21; 19	12; 21	21; 15
2	(China) (Japan)	Chen Qingchen / Jia Yifan; Nami Matsuyama / Chiharu Shida	21; 19	9; 21	17; 21
3	(China) (Japan)	He Bingjiao; Natsuki Nidaira	21; 12	21; 14
4	(China) (Japan)	Zhang Shuxian / Zheng Yu; Yuki Fukushima / Naru Shinoya	21; 19	21; 13
5	(China) (Japan)	Han Yue; Saena Kawakami				not played

Thailand
1
Binjiang Gymnasium, Court 2
September 30, 2023, 9:00 UTC+8

South Korea
3

			1	2	3
1	(Thailand) (South Korea)	Pornpawee Chochuwong; An Se-young	12; 21	21; 18	15; 21
2	(Thailand) (South Korea)	Jongkolphan Kititharakul / Rawinda Prajongjai; Baek Ha-na / Lee So-hee	25; 23	13; 21	5; 21
3	(Thailand) (South Korea)	Busanan Ongbamrungphan; Kim Ga-eun	24; 22	14; 21	21; 13
4	(Thailand) (South Korea)	Benyapa Aimsaard / Nuntakarn Aimsaard; Kim So-yeong / Kong Hee-yong	19; 21	12; 21
5	(Thailand) (South Korea)	Supanida Katethong; Kim Ga-ram				not played

=== Gold medal match ===
China
0
Binjiang Gymnasium, Court
October 1, 2023, 9:00 UTC+8

South Korea
3

			1	2	3
1	(China) (South Korea)	Chen Yufei; An Se-young	12; 21	13; 21
2	(China) (South Korea)	Chen Qingchen / Jia Yifan; Baek Ha-na / Lee So-hee	18; 21	14; 21
3	(China) (South Korea)	He Bingjiao; Kim Ga-eun	21; 23	17; 21
4	(China) (South Korea)	Zhang Shuxian / Zheng Yu; Kim So-yeong / Kong Hee-yong				not played
5	(China) (South Korea)	Han Yue; Kim Ga-ram				not played
