= Badminton at the 2018 Asian Games – Women's team =

Women's team at the 2018 Asian Games
- Venue: Istora Gelora Bung Karno
- Dates: 19–22 August
- Competitors: 92 from 11 nations

Medalists
gold medal	Japan; Yuki Fukushima, Arisa Higashino, Sayaka Hirota, Misaki Matsutomo, Aya Ohori, Nozomi Okuhara, Sayaka Sato, Ayaka Takahashi, Akane Yamaguchi, Koharu Yonemoto
silver medal	China; Cai Yanyan, Chen Qingchen, Chen Yufei, Gao Fangjie, He Bingjiao, Huang Dongping, Huang Yaqiong, Jia Yifan, Tang Jinhua, Zheng Yu
bronze medal	Indonesia; Fitriani, Della Destiara Haris, Ruselli Hartawan, Ni Ketut Mahadewi Istarani, Liliyana Natsir, Greysia Polii, Rizki Amelia Pradipta, Apriyani Rahayu, Debby Susanto, Gregoria Mariska Tunjung
bronze medal	Thailand; Chayanit Chaladchalam, Pornpawee Chochuwong, Ratchanok Intanon, Nitchaon Jindapol, Jongkolphan Kititharakul, Phataimas Muenwong, Busanan Ongbamrungphan, Rawinda Prajongjai, Puttita Supajirakul, Sapsiree Taerattanachai

The badminton women's team tournament at the 2018 Asian Games in Jakarta took place from 19 to 22 August at Istora Gelora Bung Karno.

The draw for the team event was held on 16 August. China team was the reigning champion after winning the gold medal in Incheon and Japan led the seeding.

Mongolia withdrew from this event.

Japan won the gold medal defeating second seed China 3–1 in the final, Indonesia and Thailand shared the bronze medal after losing in the semi-finals. Akane Yamaguchi lost the first match to Chen Yufei from China 21–15 21–12. In the next bout, Yuki Fukushima and Sayaka Hirota beat Chen Qingchen and Jia Yifan 21–12, 21–17, to make the team result 1–1. Nozomi Okuhara made it 2–1 for Japan after she beat He Bingjiao 21–16, 19–21, 21–15. There was no such drama in the last match when Misaki Matsutomo and Ayaka Takahashi beat Huang Dongping and Zheng Yu 21–16, 21–11.

== Schedule ==
All times are Western Indonesia Time (UTC+07:00)

Date	Time	Event
Sunday, 19 August 2018	09:00	Round of 16
Monday, 20 August 2018	09:00	Quarterfinals
Tuesday, 21 August 2018	12:00	Semifinals
Wednesday, 22 August 2018	12:00	Gold medal match

== Results ==
Round of 16
Hong Kong	0
Indonesia	3
Pakistan	0
Chinese Taipei	3
Maldives	3
Nepal	2

Quarterfinals
1	Japan	3
India	1
4	South Korea	1
Indonesia	3
Chinese Taipei	0
3	Thailand	3
Maldives	0
2	China	3

Semifinals
1	Japan	3
Indonesia	1
3	Thailand	0
2	China	3

Gold medal match
1	Japan	3
2	China	1

=== Round of 16 ===
19 August	Hong Kong	0–3	Indonesia

Cheung Ngan Yi	1–2	Gregoria Mariska Tunjung	21–19, 8–21, 18–21
Ng Tsz Yau / Yuen Sin Ying	0–2	Greysia Polii / Apriyani Rahayu	14–21, 11–21
Yip Pui Yin	1–2	Fitriani	21–18, 13–21, 10–21

19 August	Pakistan	0–3	Chinese Taipei

Mahoor Shahzad	0–2	Tai Tzu-ying	14–21, 17–21
Sehra Akram	0–2	Pai Yu-po	5–21, 6–21
Ghazala Saddique	0–2	Chiang Ying-li	6–21, 7–21

19 August	Maldives	3–2	Nepal

Fathimath Nabaaha Abdul Razzaq	0–2	Nangsal Tamang	17–21, 15–21
Aminath Nabeeha Abdul Razzaq	1–2	Jessica Gurung	21–15, 23–25, 17–21
Neela Najeeb	2–1	Rasila Maharjan	22–24, 21–15, 21–16
Aminath Nabeeha Abdul Razzaq / Neela Najeeb	2–1	Jessica Gurung / Nangsal Tamang	21–19, 19–21, 21–17
Fathimath Nabaaha Abdul Razzaq / Aminath Shahurunaaz Moosa	2–0	Amita Giri / Rasila Maharjan	21–13, 21–11

=== Quarterfinals ===
20 August	Japan	3–1	India

Akane Yamaguchi	0–2	P. V. Sindhu	18–21, 19–21
Yuki Fukushima / Sayaka Hirota	2–0	N. Sikki Reddy / Arathi Sara Sunil	21–15, 21–6
Nozomi Okuhara	2–1	Saina Nehwal	21–11, 23–25, 21–16
Misaki Matsutomo / Ayaka Takahashi	2–0	Ashwini Ponnappa / P. V. Sindhu	21–13, 21–12

20 August	South Korea	1–3	Indonesia

Sung Ji-hyun	1–2	Gregoria Mariska Tunjung	13–21, 21–8, 18–21
Lee So-hee / Shin Seung-chan	0–2	Greysia Polii / Apriyani Rahayu	18–21, 17–21
Lee Se-yeon	2–1	Fitriani	21–14, 8–21, 21–12
Baek Ha-na / Kim Hye-rin	0–2	Della Destiara Haris / Rizki Amelia Pradipta	19–21, 15–21

20 August	Chinese Taipei	0–3	Thailand

Tai Tzu-ying	0–2	Ratchanok Intanon	18–21, 18–21
Hsu Ya-ching / Wu Ti-jung	1–2	Jongkolphan Kititharakul / Rawinda Prajongjai	20–22, 21–19, 13–21
Pai Yu-po	0–2	Nitchaon Jindapol	18–21, 16–21

20 August	Maldives	0–3	China

Fathimath Nabaaha Abdul Razzaq	0–2	Chen Yufei	2–21, 3–21
Aminath Shahurunaaz Moosa	0–2	He Bingjiao	6–21, 3–21
Neela Najeeb	0–2	Gao Fangjie	5–21, 9–21

=== Semifinals ===
21 August	Japan	3–1	Indonesia

Akane Yamaguchi	1–2	Gregoria Mariska Tunjung	16–21, 21–9, 18–21
Yuki Fukushima / Sayaka Hirota	2–0	Greysia Polii / Apriyani Rahayu	21–13, 21–12
Nozomi Okuhara	2–1	Fitriani	19–21, 21–4, 21–10
Misaki Matsutomo / Ayaka Takahashi	2–0	Della Destiara Haris / Rizki Amelia Pradipta	21–13, 21–10

21 August	Thailand	0–3	China

Ratchanok Intanon	1–2	Chen Yufei	14–21, 21–17, 17–21
Jongkolphan Kititharakul / Rawinda Prajongjai	1–2	Chen Qingchen / Jia Yifan	20–22, 21–16, 14–21
Nitchaon Jindapol	0–2	He Bingjiao	17–21, 12–21

=== Gold medal match ===
22 August	Japan	3–1	China

Akane Yamaguchi	0–2	Chen Yufei	15–21, 12–21
Yuki Fukushima / Sayaka Hirota	2–0	Chen Qingchen / Jia Yifan	21–12, 21–17
Nozomi Okuhara	2–1	He Bingjiao	21–16, 19–21, 21–15
Misaki Matsutomo / Ayaka Takahashi	2–0	Huang Dongping / Zheng Yu	21–16, 21–11

== Non-participating athletes ==
- Cai Yanyan (CHN)
- Huang Yaqiong (CHN)
- Tang Jinhua (CHN)
- Chau Hoi Wah (HKG)
- Leung Yuet Yee (HKG)
- Ng Wing Yung (HKG)
- Tse Ying Suet (HKG)
- Yeung Nga Ting (HKG)
- Yeung Sum Yee (HKG)
- Ruselli Hartawan (INA)
- Ni Ketut Mahadewi Istarani (INA)
- Liliyana Natsir (INA)
- Debby Susanto (INA)
- Ashmita Chaliha (IND)
- Sai Uttejitha Rao Chukka (IND)
- Gayathri Gopichand (IND)
- Aakarshi Kashyap (IND)
- Rutaparna Panda (IND)
- Arisa Higashino (JPN)
- Aya Ohori (JPN)
- Sayaka Sato (JPN)
- Koharu Yonemoto (JPN)
- An Se-young (KOR)
- Chae Yoo-jung (KOR)
- Jeon Ju-i (KOR)
- Kong Hee-yong (KOR)
- Saima Waqas (PAK)
- Chayanit Chaladchalam (THA)
- Pornpawee Chochuwong (THA)
- Phataimas Muenwong (THA)
- Busanan Ongbamrungphan (THA)
- Puttita Supajirakul (THA)
- Sapsiree Taerattanachai (THA)
- Chen Hsiao-huan (TPE)
- Hu Ling-fang (TPE)
- Kuo Yu-wen (TPE)
- Lee Chia-hsin (TPE)
- Lin Wan-ching (TPE)
