= Zheng Yu =

Chinese badminton player

Zheng Yu 郑雨
Personal information
- Born: 7 February 1996 (age 30) Shandong, China
- Height: 1.75 m (5 ft 9 in)

Sport
- Country: China
- Sport: Badminton
- Handedness: Right

Women's doubles
- Highest ranking: 2 (with Zhang Shuxian 23 May 2023)
- Current ranking: 56 (with Zhang Shuxian 15 April 2025)
- BWF profile
Medal record
Women's badminton
Representing China
World Championships
Bronze medal – third place	2023 Copenhagen	Women's doubles
Sudirman Cup
Gold medal – first place	2021 Vantaa	Mixed team
Gold medal – first place	2023 Suzhou	Mixed team
Uber Cup
Gold medal – first place	2020 Aarhus	Women's team
Gold medal – first place	2024 Chengdu	Women's team
Silver medal – second place	2022 Bangkok	Women's team
Bronze medal – third place	2018 Bangkok	Women's team
Asian Games
Silver medal – second place	2018 Jakarta–Palembang	Women's team
Silver medal – second place	2022 Hangzhou	Women's team
Asian Championships
Silver medal – second place	2024 Ningbo	Women's doubles
Bronze medal – third place	2025 Ningbo	Women's doubles
Asia Team Championships
Silver medal – second place	2018 Alor Setar	Women's team
World Junior Championships
Gold medal – first place	2012 Chiba	Mixed team
Asian Junior Championships
Gold medal – first place	2011 Lucknow	Mixed team

Zheng Yu (Chinese: 郑雨; pinyin: Zhèng Yǔ; born 7 February 1996) is a Chinese badminton player from the Jiangsu province team. She started playing badminton in 2003, claimed the Jiangsu province title in the singles and doubles category in 2006 and 2007, then was selected to join the national team for the first time in 2010. She was part of the national junior team that won the mixed team gold medals at the 2011 Asian and 2012 World Junior Championships. She won her first senior international title at the BWF Super 500 tournament 2020 Malaysia Masters partnered with Li Wenmei.

== Career ==
Starting from 2022, Zheng partnered with Zhang Shuxian and finished as the runners-up at the All England Open, Malaysia Open and Singapore Open, before finally winning the Australian Open. As a result, the pair qualified for the year-end final. They reached the semi-finals before bowing out to compatriots Chen Qingchen and Jia Yifan.

In the first half of the 2023 season, Zheng did not win any title with Zhang Shuxian. The duo opened the year by reaching the semi-finals of the BWF Super 1000 tournament, the Malaysia Open, but was stunned by Korean pairing Baek Ha-na and Lee Yu-lim. Other semi-finals finished were at the All England and the Singapore Opens. Zheng and Zhang also reached the quarter-finals in the India, Swiss, and Indonesia Opens. Zheng was also part of the China winning squad in the Sudirman Cup. Their achievement was able to bring them up to the 2nd place in the BWF rankings. In August, Zheng and Zhang finished as semi-finalists in the BWF World Championships, losing to their compatriots and eventual champions Chen Qingchen and Jia Yifan. The defeat exacerbated their head-to-head record over Chen and Jia to 0–6.

== Achievements ==
=== World Championships ===
Women's doubles
Year	Venue	Partner	Opponent	Score	Result
2023	Royal Arena, Copenhagen, Denmark	(China) Zhang Shuxian	(China) Chen Qingchen (China) Jia Yifan	14–21, 16–21	Bronze

=== Asian Championships ===
Women's doubles
Year	Venue	Partner	Opponent	Score	Result
2024	Ningbo Olympic Sports Center Gymnasium, Ningbo, China	(China) Zhang Shuxian	(South Korea) Baek Ha-na (South Korea) Lee So-hee	21–23, 12–21	Silver
2025	Ningbo Olympic Sports Center Gymnasium, Ningbo, China	(China) Zhang Shuxian	(China) Liu Shengshu (China) Tan Ning	12–21, 15–21	Bronze

=== BWF World Tour (5 titles, 11 runners-up) ===
The BWF World Tour, which was announced on 19 March 2017 and implemented in 2018, is a series of elite badminton tournaments sanctioned by the Badminton World Federation (BWF). The BWF World Tour is divided into levels of World Tour Finals, Super 1000, Super 750, Super 500, Super 300, and the BWF Tour Super 100.

Women's doubles
Year	Tournament	Level	Partner	Opponent	Score	Result
2018	German Open	Super 300	(China) Huang Dongping	(Japan) Yuki Fukushima (Japan) Sayaka Hirota	21–18, 14–21, 6–21	(silver) Runner-up
2018	New Zealand Open	Super 300	(China) Cao Tongwei	(Japan) Ayako Sakuramoto (Japan) Yukiko Takahata	9–21, 19–21	(silver) Runner-up
2019	Thailand Masters	Super 300	(China) Li Wenmei	(Thailand) Puttita Supajirakul (Thailand) Sapsiree Taerattanachai	21–15, 15–21, 10–21	(silver) Runner-up
2020	Malaysia Masters	Super 500	(China) Li Wenmei	(China) Du Yue (China) Li Yinhui	21–19, 16–21, 21–12	(gold) Winner
2021	Denmark Open	Super 1000	(China) Huang Dongping	(South Korea) Lee So-hee (South Korea) Shin Seung-chan	21–15, 21–17	(gold) Winner
2022	All England Open	Super 1000	(China) Zhang Shuxian	(Japan) Nami Matsuyama (Japan) Chiharu Shida	13–21, 9–21	(silver) Runner-up
2022	Malaysia Open	Super 750	(China) Zhang Shuxian	(Indonesia) Apriyani Rahayu (Indonesia) Siti Fadia Silva Ramadhanti	18–21, 21–12, 19–21	(silver) Runner-up
2022	Singapore Open	Super 500	(China) Zhang Shuxian	(Indonesia) Apriyani Rahayu (Indonesia) Siti Fadia Silva Ramadhanti	14–21, 17–21	(silver) Runner-up
2022	Australian Open	Super 300	(China) Zhang Shuxian	(Thailand) Benyapa Aimsaard (Thailand) Nuntakarn Aimsaard	21–19, 21–13	(gold) Winner
2023	Hylo Open	Super 300	(China) Zhang Shuxian	(Indonesia) Apriyani Rahayu (Indonesia) Siti Fadia Silva Ramadhanti	18–21, 1–1^{r}	(gold) Winner
2023	Japan Masters	Super 500	(China) Zhang Shuxian	(China) Liu Shengshu (China) Tan Ning	12–21, 21–12, 21–17	(gold) Winner
2024	Malaysia Open	Super 1000	(China) Zhang Shuxian	(China) Liu Shengshu (China) Tan Ning	18–21, 18–21	(silver) Runner-up
2024	India Open	Super 750	(China) Zhang Shuxian	(Japan) Mayu Matsumoto (Japan) Wakana Nagahara	12–21, 13–21	(silver) Runner-up
2024	Indonesia Masters	Super 500	(China) Zhang Shuxian	(China) Liu Shengshu (China) Tan Ning	21–10, 19–21, 20–22	(silver) Runner-up
2025	Ruichang China Masters	Super 100	(China) Qiao Shijun	(China) Chen Xiaofei (China) Feng Xueying	17–21, 12–21	(silver) Runner-up
2025	Baoji China Masters	Super 100	(China) Qiao Shijun	(China) Luo Yi (China) Wang Tingge	21–17, 21–23, 15–21	(silver) Runner-up
