= Melati =

Melati may refer to

- Melati (name)
- Taman Melati, a township in Kuala Lumpur, Malaysia
  - Taman Melati LRT station
- Melati untuk Marvel, Indonesian TV serial
- Melati van Agam (disambiguation)
