= Melati (name) =

Melati is a Malay-Indonesian name that is derived from Sanskrit may refer to the following notable people:

Given name

- Melati Daeva Oktavianti (born 1994), Indonesian badminton player
- Melati van Java (1853–1927), Indonesian-born Dutch writer
- Melati Suryodarmo (born 1969), Indonesian durational performance artist
- Melati Wijsen (born 2001), Indonesian climate activist

Surname

- Nadya Melati (born 1986), Indonesian badminton player
- Rima Melati (born 1939), Indonesian actress and singer
- Rima Melati Adams (born 1980), Singaporean model, actress, singer and TV personality
