= 2019 Denmark Open =

2019 badminton tournament in Odense

Tournament details
- Dates: 15–20 October
- Level: Super 750
- Total prize money: US$775,000
- Venue: Odense Sports Park
- Location: Odense, Denmark

Champions
- Men's singles: (Japan) Kento Momota
- Women's singles: (Chinese Taipei) Tai Tzu-ying
- Men's doubles: (Indonesia) Marcus Fernaldi Gideon (Indonesia) Kevin Sanjaya Sukamuljo
- Women's doubles: (South Korea) Baek Ha-na (South Korea) Jung Kyung-eun
- Mixed doubles: (Indonesia) Praveen Jordan (Indonesia) Melati Daeva Oktavianti

The 2019 Denmark Open (officially known as the Danisa Denmark Open presented by Victor 2019 for sponsorship reasons) was a badminton competition which took place at Odense Sports Park in Odense, Denmark, from 15 to 20 October 2019. It had a total purse of $775,000.

== Tournament ==
The 2019 Denmark Open was the twentieth tournament of the 2019 BWF World Tour and also part of the Denmark Open championships, which has been held since 1935. This tournament was organized by Badminton Denmark with the sanction of the BWF.

=== Venue ===
This international tournament was held at Odense Sports Park in Odense, Denmark.

=== Point distribution ===
Below is the point distribution table for each phase of the tournament based on the BWF points system for the BWF World Tour Super 750 event.

Winner	Runner-up	3/4	5/8	9/16	17/32
11,000	9,350	7,700	6,050	4,320	2,660

=== Prize money ===
The total prize money for this tournament was US$775,000. Distribution of prize money was in accordance with BWF regulations.

Event	Winner	Finals	Semi-finals	Quarter-finals	Last 16	Last 32
Singles	$54,250	$26,350	$10,850	$4,363.50	$2,325	$775
Doubles	$57,350	$27,125	$10,850	$4,843.75	$2,518.75	$775

== Men's singles ==
=== Seeds ===
1. (Japan) Kento Momota (champion)
2. (Chinese Taipei) Chou Tien-chen (quarter-finals)
3. (China) Shi Yuqi (withdrew)
4. (Denmark) Anders Antonsen (quarter-finals)
5. (China) Chen Long (final)
6. (Indonesia) Jonatan Christie (second round)
7. (Denmark) Viktor Axelsen (semi-finals)
8. (Indonesia) Anthony Sinisuka Ginting (first round)

=== Finals ===
Semi-finals
1	(Japan) Kento Momota	21	21
(Indonesia) Tommy Sugiarto	12	19
7	(Denmark) Viktor Axelsen	21	14	19
5	(China) Chen Long	12	21	21

Final
1	(Japan) Kento Momota	21	21
5	(China) Chen Long	14	12

=== Top half ===
==== Section 1 ====
First Round
1	(Japan) K Momota	21	21
(Hong Kong) Wong W K	15	17
(China) Lin D	14	17
(India) B. Sai Praneeth	21	21
6	(Indonesia) J Christie	20	21	21
(Denmark) J Ø. Jørgensen	22	12	11
(Denmark) R Gemke	16	21	21
(Hong Kong) Lee C Y	21	14	18

Second Round
1	(Japan) K Momota	21	21
(India) B. Sai Praneeth	6	14
6	(Indonesia) J Christie	17	21
(Denmark) R Gemke	21	23

Quarter-finals
1	(Japan) K Momota	21	21	21
(Denmark) R Gemke	14	23	13

==== Section 2 ====
First Round
PFR	(India) So Verma	21	11	17
(Netherlands) M Caljouw	19	21	21
(Thailand) S Thammasin	21	21
(India) P Kashyap	13	12
8	(Indonesia) A S Ginting	21	19	20
PFR	(France) B Leverdez	16	21	22
(Denmark) H-K Vittinghus	14	21	17
(Indonesia) T Sugiarto	21	15	21

Second Round
(Netherlands) M Caljouw	11	21	9
(Thailand) S Thammasin	21	18	21
PFR	(France) B Leverdez	19	12
(Indonesia) T Sugiarto	21	21

Quarter-finals
(Thailand) S Thammasin	17	19
(Indonesia) T Sugiarto	21	21

=== Bottom half ===
==== Section 3 ====
First Round
(Thailand) K Phetpradab	13	21	21
(Chinese Taipei) Wang T-w	21	18	18
(Japan) K Nishimoto	19	19
7	(Denmark) V Axelsen	21	21
(Thailand) K Wangcharoen	21	23
(China) Huang YX	17	21
(India) S Kidambi	14	18
4	(Denmark) A Antonsen	21	21

Second Round
(Thailand) K Phetpradab	13	15
7	(Denmark) V Axelsen	21	21
(Thailand) K Wangcharoen	17	12
4	(Denmark) A Antonsen	21	21

Quarter-finals
7	(Denmark) V Axelsen	24	21
4	(Denmark) A Antonsen	22	12

==== Section 4 ====
First Round
(Japan) K Tsuneyama	11	11
(India) Sa Verma	21	21
(Malaysia) Lee Z J	18	21	16
5	(China) Chen L	21	15	21
(Hong Kong) Ng K L	15	15
(Indonesia) S H Rhustavito	21	21
(China) Lu GZ	13	21	17
2	(Chinese Taipei) Chou T-c	21	17	21

Second Round
(India) Sa Verma	12	10
5	(China) Chen L	21	21
(Indonesia) S H Rhustavito	17	14
2	(Chinese Taipei) Chou T-c	21	21

Quarter-finals
5	(China) Chen L	21	21
2	(Chinese Taipei) Chou T-c	17	17

== Women's singles ==
=== Seeds ===
1. (Japan) Akane Yamaguchi (first round)
2. (China) Chen Yufei (semi-finals)
3. (Japan) Nozomi Okuhara (final)
4. (Chinese Taipei) Tai Tzu-ying (champion)
5. (India) P. V. Sindhu (second round)
6. (Thailand) Ratchanok Intanon (second round)
7. (China) He Bingjiao (first round)
8. (India) Saina Nehwal (first round)

=== Finals ===
Semi-finals
(Spain) Carolina Marín	21	12	16
3	(Japan) Nozomi Okuhara	18	21	21
4	(Chinese Taipei) Tai Tzu-ying	21	14
2	(China) Chen Yufei	14	11^{r}

Final
3	(Japan) Nozomi Okuhara	17	14
4	(Chinese Taipei) Tai Tzu-ying	21	21

=== Top half ===
==== Section 1 ====
First Round
1	(Japan) A Yamaguchi	19	18
(Hong Kong) Cheung N Y	21	21
(Thailand) P Chochuwong	16	19
(Spain) C Marín	21	21
5	(India) P. V. Sindhu	22	21
(Indonesia) G M Tunjung	20	18
(China) Chen XX	18	13
(South Korea) An S-y	21	21

Second Round
(Hong Kong) Cheung N Y	20	27
(Spain) C Marín	22	29
5	(India) P. V. Sindhu	14	17
(South Korea) An S-y	21	21

Quarter-finals
(Spain) C Marín	18	21	21
(South Korea) An S-y	21	19	18

==== Section 2 ====
First Round
3	(Japan) N Okuhara	18	21	21
(Thailand) B Ongbamrungphan	21	9	16
(China) Han Y	21	21
(Scotland) K Gilmour	16	18
7	(China) He BJ	23	18
(South Korea) Sung J-h	25	21
(United States) Zhang BW	21	17	21
(Denmark) L Kjærsfeldt	12	21	17

Second Round
3	(Japan) N Okuhara	21	21
(China) Han Y	10	10
(South Korea) Sung J-h	21	17	9^{r}
(United States) Zhang BW	14	21	13

Quarter-finals
3	(Japan) N Okuhara	21	21
(United States) Zhang BW	17	8

=== Bottom half ===
==== Section 3 ====
First Round
(Japan) A Ohori	21	16	21
(Russia) E Kosetskaya	14	21	18
(Denmark) M Blichfeldt
6	(Thailand) R Intanon	w	/	o
(Canada) M Li	21	21
PFR	(Germany) Y Li	10	15
(Thailand) N Jindapol	15	9
4	(Chinese Taipei) Tai T-y	21	21

Second Round
(Japan) A Ohori	21	12	21
6	(Thailand) R Intanon	19	21	15
(Canada) M Li	17	17
4	(Chinese Taipei) Tai T-y	21	21

Quarter-finals
(Japan) A Ohori	16	12
4	(Chinese Taipei) Tai T-y	21	21

==== Section 4 ====
First Round
(Malaysia) S Cheah S Y	20	16
(South Korea) Kim G-e	22	21
(Japan) S Takahashi	21	23
8	(India) S Nehwal	15	21
(China) Cai YY	21	21
(Indonesia) Fitriani	15	15
(Singapore) Yeo J M	14	13
2	(China) Chen YF	21	21

Second Round
(South Korea) Kim G-e	16	14
(Japan) S Takahashi	21	21
(China) Cai YY	14	10
2	(China) Chen YF	21	21

Quarter-finals
(Japan) S Takahashi	9	7
2	(China) Chen YF	21	21

== Men's doubles ==
=== Seeds ===
1. (Indonesia) Marcus Fernaldi Gideon / Kevin Sanjaya Sukamuljo (champions)
2. (Indonesia) Mohammad Ahsan / Hendra Setiawan (final)
3. (China) Li Junhui / Liu Yuchen (quarter-finals)
4. (Japan) Takeshi Kamura / Keigo Sonoda (semi-finals)
5. (Japan) Hiroyuki Endo / Yuta Watanabe (quarter-finals)
6. (China) Han Chengkai / Zhou Haodong (quarter-finals)
7. (Indonesia) Fajar Alfian / Muhammad Rian Ardianto (quarter-finals)
8. (Denmark) Kim Astrup / Anders Skaarup Rasmussen (first round)

=== Finals ===
Semi-finals
1	(Indonesia) Marcus Fernaldi Gideon (Indonesia) Kevin Sanjaya Sukamuljo	21	21
(Chinese Taipei) Lu Ching-yao (Chinese Taipei) Yang Po-han	16	11
4	(Japan) Takeshi Kamura (Japan) Keigo Sonoda	19	21	15
2	(Indonesia) Mohammad Ahsan (Indonesia) Hendra Setiawan	21	19	21

Final
1	(Indonesia) Marcus Fernaldi Gideon (Indonesia) Kevin Sanjaya Sukamuljo	21	21
2	(Indonesia) Mohammad Ahsan (Indonesia) Hendra Setiawan	14	13

=== Top half ===
==== Section 1 ====
First Round
1	(Indonesia) M F Gideon (Indonesia) K S Sukamuljo	21	21
(Chinese Taipei) Liao M-c (Chinese Taipei) Su C-h	18	18
(Japan) T Hoki (Japan) Y Kobayashi	14	17
PFR	(England) B Lane (England) S Vendy	21	21
6	(China) Han CK (China) Zhou HD	21	21
(Denmark) M Boe (Denmark) M Conrad-Petersen	19	16
(India) S Rankireddy (India) C Shetty	24	21
(South Korea) Kim G-j (South Korea) Lee Y-d	22	11

Second Round
1	(Indonesia) M F Gideon (Indonesia) K S Sukamuljo	w	/	o
PFR	(England) B Lane (England) S Vendy
6	(China) Han CK (China) Zhou HD	21	21
(India) S Rankireddy (India) C Shetty	16	15

Quarter-finals
1	(Indonesia) M F Gideon (Indonesia) K S Sukamuljo	21	21
6	(China) Han CK (China) Zhou HD	16	14

==== Section 2 ====
First Round
3	(China) Li JH (China) Liu YC	21	15	22
(Chinese Taipei) Lee J-h (Chinese Taipei) Yang P-hs	14	21	20
PFR	(China) Di ZJ (China) Wang C	13	21	15
(England) M Ellis (England) C Langridge	21	13	21
8	(Denmark) K Astrup (Denmark) A S Rasmussen	18	19
(Chinese Taipei) Lu C-y (Chinese Taipei) Yang P-ha	21	21
(Netherlands) J Maas (Netherlands) R Tabeling	16	21	18
(Indonesia) W Nayaka (Indonesia) A Yusuf	21	18	21

Second Round
3	(China) Li JH (China) Liu YC	21	22
(England) M Ellis (England) C Langridge	16	20
(Chinese Taipei) Lu C-y (Chinese Taipei) Yang P-ha	20	21	21
(Indonesia) W Nayaka (Indonesia) A Yusuf	22	12	19

Quarter-finals
3	(China) Li JH (China) Liu YC	21	14	14
(Chinese Taipei) Lu C-y (Chinese Taipei) Yang P-ha	17	21	21

=== Bottom half ===
==== Section 3 ====
First Round
(United States) P Chew (United States) R Chew	21	21
(China) Ou XY (China) Zhang N	16	19
(China) He JT (China) Tan Q	19	18
7	(Indonesia) F Alfian (Indonesia) M R Ardianto	21	21
(Chinese Taipei) Lee Y (Chinese Taipei) Wang C-l	21	21
(China) Huang KX (China) Liu C	19	12
(South Korea) Choi S-g (South Korea) Seo S-j	14	19
4	(Japan) T Kamura (Japan) K Sonoda	21	21

Second Round
(United States) P Chew (United States) R Chew	8	16
7	(Indonesia) F Alfian (Indonesia) M R Ardianto	21	21
(Chinese Taipei) Lee Y (Chinese Taipei) Wang C-l	21	17	19
4	(Japan) T Kamura (Japan) K Sonoda	18	21	21

Quarter-finals
7	(Indonesia) F Alfian (Indonesia) M R Ardianto	15	19
4	(Japan) T Kamura (Japan) K Sonoda	21	21

==== Section 4 ====
First Round
(Germany) M Lamsfuß (Germany) M E Seidel	21	21
(Japan) T Inoue (Japan) Y Kaneko	19	18
(Thailand) B Isara (Thailand) M Jongjit	9	14
5	(Japan) H Endo (Japan) Y Watanabe	21	21
(Malaysia) A Chia (Malaysia) Soh W Y	21	24
(Malaysia) Ong Y S (Malaysia) Teo E Y	16	22
(Malaysia) Goh V S (Malaysia) Tan W K	16	14
2	(Indonesia) M Ahsan (Indonesia) H Setiawan	21	21

Second Round
(Germany) M Lamsfuß (Germany) M E Seidel	21	20	11
5	(Japan) H Endo (Japan) Y Watanabe	19	22	21
(Malaysia) A Chia (Malaysia) Soh W Y	20	16
2	(Indonesia) M Ahsan (Indonesia) H Setiawan	22	21

Quarter-finals
5	(Japan) H Endo (Japan) Y Watanabe	15	14
2	(Indonesia) M Ahsan (Indonesia) H Setiawan	21	21

== Women's doubles ==
=== Seeds ===
1. (Japan) Mayu Matsumoto / Wakana Nagahara (semi-finals)
2. (Japan) Yuki Fukushima / Sayaka Hirota (semi-finals)
3. (Japan) Misaki Matsutomo / Ayaka Takahashi (first round)
4. (China) Chen Qingchen / Jia Yifan (final)
5. (Indonesia) Greysia Polii / Apriyani Rahayu (second round)
6. (South Korea) Lee So-hee / Shin Seung-chan (quarter-finals)
7. (China) Du Yue / Li Yinhui (second round)
8. (South Korea) Kim So-yeong / Kong Hee-yong (quarter-finals)

=== Finals ===
Semi-finals
1	(Japan) Mayu Matsumoto (Japan) Wakana Nagahara	21	12	15
(South Korea) Baek Ha-na (South Korea) Jung Kyung-eun	19	21	21
4	(China) Chen Qingchen (China) Jia Yifan	18	21	21
2	(Japan) Yuki Fukushima (Japan) Sayaka Hirota	21	17	18

Final
(South Korea) Baek Ha-na (South Korea) Jung Kyung-eun	9	21	21
4	(China) Chen Qingchen (China) Jia Yifan	21	19	15

=== Top half ===
==== Section 1 ====
First Round
1	(Japan) M Matsumoto (Japan) W Nagahara	25	21
(India) A Ponnappa (India) N. S Reddy	23	18
(China) Liu XX (China) Xia YT	21	21
(France) É Lefel (France) A Tran	19	13
6	(South Korea) Lee S-h (South Korea) Shin S-c	21	21
PFR	(Denmark) C Busch (Denmark) A Schulz	7	15
(Thailand) J Kititharakul (Thailand) R Prajongjai	21	21
(Sweden) E Karlsson (Sweden) J Magnusson	12	8

Second Round
1	(Japan) M Matsumoto (Japan) W Nagahara	21	21
(China) Liu XX (China) Xia YT	17	15
6	(South Korea) Lee S-h (South Korea) Shin S-c	21	21
(Thailand) J Kititharakul (Thailand) R Prajongjai	8	19

Quarter-finals
1	(Japan) M Matsumoto (Japan) W Nagahara	18	21	22
6	(South Korea) Lee S-h (South Korea) Shin S-c	21	13	20

==== Section 2 ====
First Round
3	(Japan) M Matsutomo (Japan) A Takahashi	12	21	17
(Thailand) P Supajirakul (Thailand) S Taerattanachai	21	17	21
(Malaysia) Chow M K (Malaysia) Lee M Y	20	21	21
(France) D Delrue (France) L Palermo	22	8	13
7	(China) Du Y (China) Li YH	21	21
(Canada) R Honderich (Canada) K Tsai	18	17
(South Korea) Baek H-n (South Korea) Jung K-e	21	12	21
(China) Dong WJ (China) Feng XY	12	21	9

Second Round
(Thailand) P Supajirakul (Thailand) S Taerattanachai	21	24
(Malaysia) Chow M K (Malaysia) Lee M Y	12	22
7	(China) Du Y (China) Li YH	17	21	19
(South Korea) Baek H-n (South Korea) Jung K-e	21	18	21

Quarter-finals
(Thailand) P Supajirakul (Thailand) S Taerattanachai	13	16
(South Korea) Baek H-n (South Korea) Jung K-e	21	21

=== Bottom half ===
==== Section 3 ====
First Round
(Chinese Taipei) Cheng C-y (Chinese Taipei) Lee C-c	14	10
(South Korea) Chang Y-n (South Korea) Kim H-r	21	21
(Malaysia) V Hoo K M (Malaysia) Yap C W	10	18
5	(Indonesia) G Polii (Indonesia) A Rahayu	21	21
(Bulgaria) G Stoeva (Bulgaria) S Stoeva	13	12
(Japan) A Sakuramoto (Japan) Y Takahata	21	21
(Denmark) A Magelund (Denmark) F Ravn	16	8
4	(China) Chen QC (China) Jia YF	21	21

Second Round
(South Korea) Chang Y-n (South Korea) Kim H-r	23	21
5	(Indonesia) G Polii (Indonesia) A Rahayu	21	16
(Japan) A Sakuramoto (Japan) Y Takahata	17	21	16
4	(China) Chen QC (China) Jia YF	21	16	21

Quarter-finals
(South Korea) Chang Y-n (South Korea) Kim H-r	16	11
4	(China) Chen QC (China) Jia YF	21	21

==== Section 4 ====
First Round
(England) C Birch (England) L Smith	16	19
(China) Li WM (China) Zheng Y	21	21
(Germany) L Efler (Germany) I Herttrich	15	14
8	(South Korea) Kim S-y (South Korea) Kong H-y	21	21
(Netherlands) S Piek (Netherlands) C Seinen	21	21
(Chinese Taipei) Hsu Y-c (Chinese Taipei) Hu L-f	17	17
(Denmark) M Fruergaard (Denmark) S Thygesen	9	10
2	(Japan) Y Fukushima (Japan) S Hirota	21	21

Second Round
(China) Li WM (China) Zheng Y	21	16	22
8	(South Korea) Kim S-y (South Korea) Kong H-y	11	21	24
(Netherlands) S Piek (Netherlands) C Seinen	18	14
2	(Japan) Y Fukushima (Japan) S Hirota	21	21

Quarter-finals
8	(South Korea) Kim S-y (South Korea) Kong H-y	18	21	18
2	(Japan) Y Fukushima (Japan) S Hirota	21	18	21

== Mixed doubles ==
=== Seeds ===
1. (China) Zheng Siwei / Huang Yaqiong (quarter-finals)
2. (China) Wang Yilü / Huang Dongping (final)
3. (Japan) Yuta Watanabe / Arisa Higashino (first round)
4. (Malaysia) Chan Peng Soon / Goh Liu Ying (quarter-finals)
5. (South Korea) Seo Seung-jae / Chae Yoo-jung (semi-finals)
6. (Indonesia) Praveen Jordan / Melati Daeva Oktavianti (champions)
7. (England) Marcus Ellis / Lauren Smith (first round)
8. (Hong Kong) Tang Chun Man / Tse Ying Suet (quarter-finals)

=== Finals ===
Semi-finals
6	(Indonesia) Praveen Jordan (Indonesia) Melati Daeva Oktavianti	21	21
PFR	(Chinese Taipei) Wang Chi-lin (Chinese Taipei) Cheng Chi-ya	12	12
5	(South Korea) Seo Seung-jae (South Korea) Chae Yoo-jung	15	21	11
2	(China) Wang Yilü (China) Huang Dongping	21	15	21

Final
6	(Indonesia) Praveen Jordan (Indonesia) Melati Daeva Oktavianti	21	18	21
2	(China) Wang Yilü (China) Huang Dongping	18	21	19

=== Top half ===
==== Section 1 ====
First Round
1	(China) Zheng SW (China) Huang YQ	21	21
(Thailand) D Puavaranukroh (Thailand) P Supajirakul	10	12
(Japan) T Hoki (Japan) W Nagahara	21	20	21
(Indonesia) T Ahmad (Indonesia) W O Kandow	17	22	17
6	(Indonesia) P Jordan (Indonesia) M D Oktavianti	21	21
(England) B Lane (England) J Pugh	12	19
(China) Lu K (China) Chen L	21	20	21
(Indonesia) R Rivaldy (Indonesia) P H Mentari	14	22	16

Second Round
1	(China) Zheng SW (China) Huang YQ	21	23
(Japan) T Hoki (Japan) W Nagahara	15	21
6	(Indonesia) P Jordan (Indonesia) M D Oktavianti	18	21	21
(China) Lu K (China) Chen L	21	15	13

Quarter-finals
1	(China) Zheng SW (China) Huang YQ	21	16	20
6	(Indonesia) P Jordan (Indonesia) M D Oktavianti	18	21	22

==== Section 2 ====
First Round
3	(Japan) Y Watanabe (Japan) A Higashino	19	21	19
(France) T Gicquel (France) D Delrue	21	13	21
PFR	(Chinese Taipei) Wang C-l (Chinese Taipei) Cheng C-y	21	21
(Japan) Y Kaneko (Japan) M Matsutomo	17	17
8	(Hong Kong) Tang C M (Hong Kong) Tse Y S	9	21	22
(Netherlands) R Tabeling (Netherlands) S Piek	21	17	20
(Republic of Ireland) S Magee (Republic of Ireland) C Magee	21	13	15
(Malaysia) Goh S H (Malaysia) S J Lai	19	21	21

Second Round
(France) T Gicquel (France) D Delrue	14	15
PFR	(Chinese Taipei) Wang C-l (Chinese Taipei) Cheng C-y	21	21
8	(Hong Kong) Tang C M (Hong Kong) Tse Y S	21	22
(Malaysia) Goh S H (Malaysia) S J Lai	15	20

Quarter-finals
PFR	(Chinese Taipei) Wang C-l (Chinese Taipei) Cheng C-y	21	16	21
8	(Hong Kong) Tang C M (Hong Kong) Tse Y S	11	21	18

=== Bottom half ===
==== Section 3 ====
First Round
(Hong Kong) Chang T C (Hong Kong) Ng W Y	18	21	21
(England) C Adcock (England) G Adcock	21	17	18
(Malaysia) Tan K M (Malaysia) Lai P J	13	15
5	(South Korea) Seo S-j (South Korea) Chae Y-j	21	21
(India) P Chopra (India) N. S Reddy	21	21
(Germany) M E Seidel (Germany) L Efler	16	11
(Japan) K Gondo (Japan) A Kurihara	17	14
4	(Malaysia) Chan P S (Malaysia) Goh L Y	21	21

Second Round
(Hong Kong) Chang T C (Hong Kong) Ng W Y	12	6
5	(South Korea) Seo S-j (South Korea) Chae Y-j	21	21
(India) P Chopra (India) N. S Reddy	24	21	11
4	(Malaysia) Chan P S (Malaysia) Goh L Y	26	13	21

Quarter-finals
5	(South Korea) Seo S-j (South Korea) Chae Y-j	21	21
4	(Malaysia) Chan P S (Malaysia) Goh L Y	18	18

==== Section 4 ====
First Round
(Thailand) N Phuangphuapet (Thailand) S Amitrapai	21	21
(Germany) M Lamsfuß (Germany) I Herttrich	11	19
(China) He JT (China) Du Y	21	21
7	(England) M Ellis (England) L Smith	19	12
(Canada) J Hurlburt-Yu (Canada) J Wu	24	16
(Indonesia) H Faizal (Indonesia) G E Widjaja	26	21
(India) S Rankireddy (India) A Ponnappa
2	(China) Wang YL (China) Huang DP	w	/	o

Second Round
(Thailand) N Phuangphuapet (Thailand) S Amitrapai	18	7
(China) He JT (China) Du Y	21	21
(Indonesia) H Faizal (Indonesia) G E Widjaja	19	21	17
2	(China) Wang YL (China) Huang DP	21	16	21

Quarter-finals
(China) He JT (China) Du Y	13	13
2	(China) Wang YL (China) Huang DP	21	21

Preceded by 2019 Dutch Open	BWF World Tour; 2019 BWF season	Succeeded by 2019 French Open
