= Praveen Jordan =

Indonesian badminton player (born 1993)

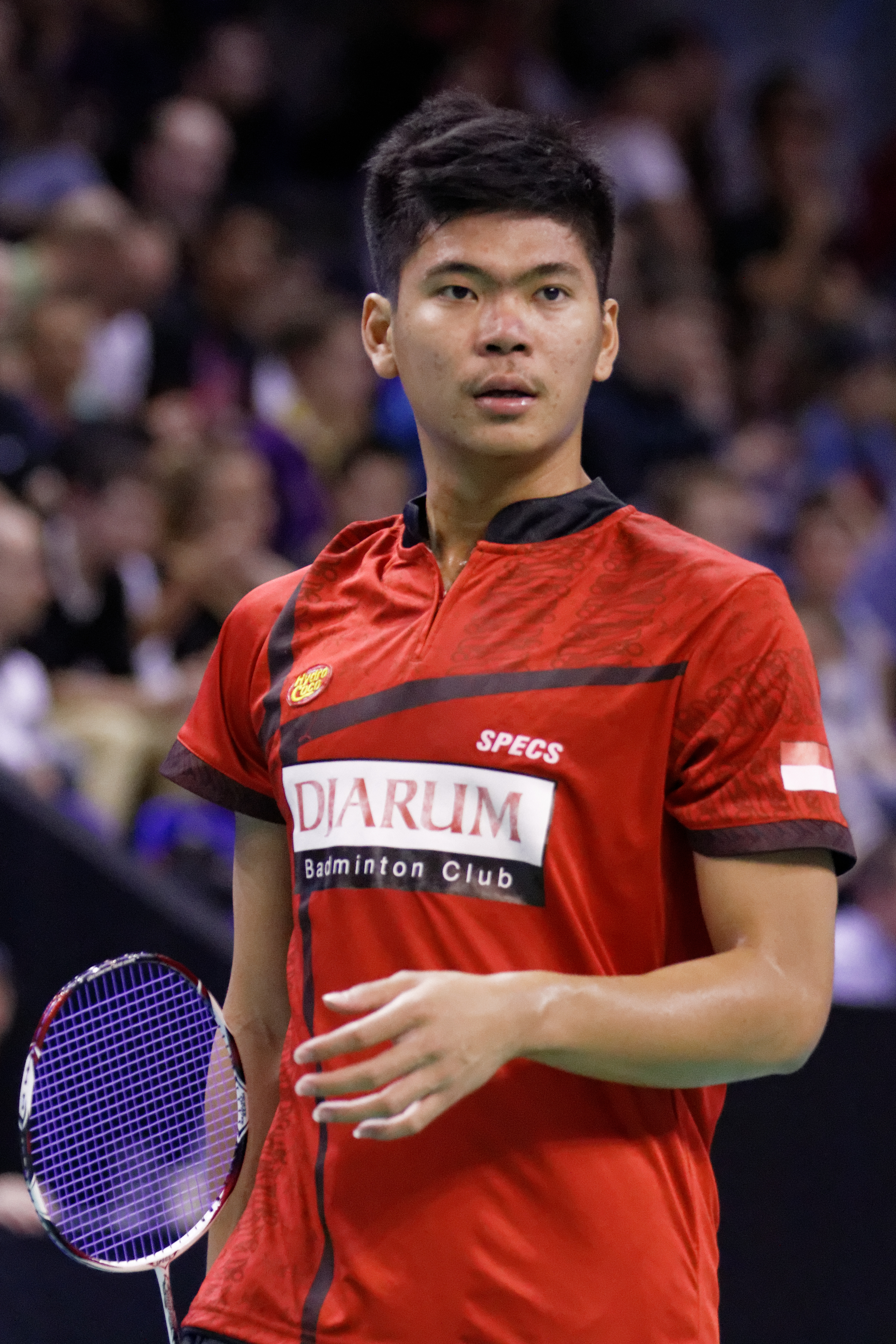
- Jordan at the 2013 French Open Superseries

Personal information
- Born: 26 April 1993 (age 33) Bontang, East Kalimantan, Indonesia
- Height: 1.81 m (5 ft 11 in)
- Weight: 87 kg (192 lb)

Sport
- Country: Indonesia
- Sport: Badminton
- Handedness: Right

Mixed doubles
- Highest ranking: 2 (with Debby Susanto 2 November 2016); 4 (with Melati Daeva Oktavianti 17 March 2020)
- Current ranking: 31 (with Melati Daeva Oktavianti 2 April 2024)
- BWF profile
Medal record
Men's badminton
Representing Indonesia
Sudirman Cup
Bronze medal – third place	2015 Dongguan	Mixed team
Bronze medal – third place	2019 Nanning	Mixed team
Asian Games
Bronze medal – third place	2014 Incheon	Mixed doubles
Asian Championships
Bronze medal – third place	2022 Manila	Mixed doubles
SEA Games
Gold medal – first place	2015 Singapore	Mixed doubles
Gold medal – first place	2015 Singapore	Men's team
Gold medal – first place	2019 Philippines	Mixed doubles
Gold medal – first place	2019 Philippines	Men's team
Asian Junior Championships
Bronze medal – third place	2011 Lucknow	Mixed doubles
Bronze medal – third place	2011 Lucknow	Mixed team

Praveen Jordan (born 26 April 1993) is an Indonesian badminton player who specialises in doubles. He is a two-time All England Open champion in mixed doubles, winning in 2016 with Debby Susanto and in 2020 with Melati Daeva Oktavianti. He has played for the badminton club PB Djarum since 2008.

== Career ==
=== Junior career ===
Jordan participated in 2011 Badminton Asia Junior Championships in Lucknow, India. In the mixed team event, he played in the men's doubles along with Rangga Yave Rianto. In the first round they won their match, with Indonesia defeating Nepal 5–0. He and Rianto played back against Hong Kong in the third round, winning their match and helping Indonesia win 4–1. In the quarter-finals Jordan and Rianto won their match and helped Indonesia beat Japan 3–2. In the semi-finals they lost to the Malaysian team 1–3, and the team won the bronze medal. In the individual event, he played in two categories, in the men's doubles with Rianto, and in the mixed doubles with Tiara Rosalia Nuraidah. As the top seed in the men's doubles he was only able to reach the quarter-finals after being defeated by a Chinese Taipei pair; and then he won a bronze medal in the mixed doubles after losing to a Chinese pair in the semi-finals.

=== 2010–2012 ===
Jordan started his senior career as a PB Djarum player in 2010, playing at several international tournaments in two specialties: men's and mixed doubles.

=== 2013 ===
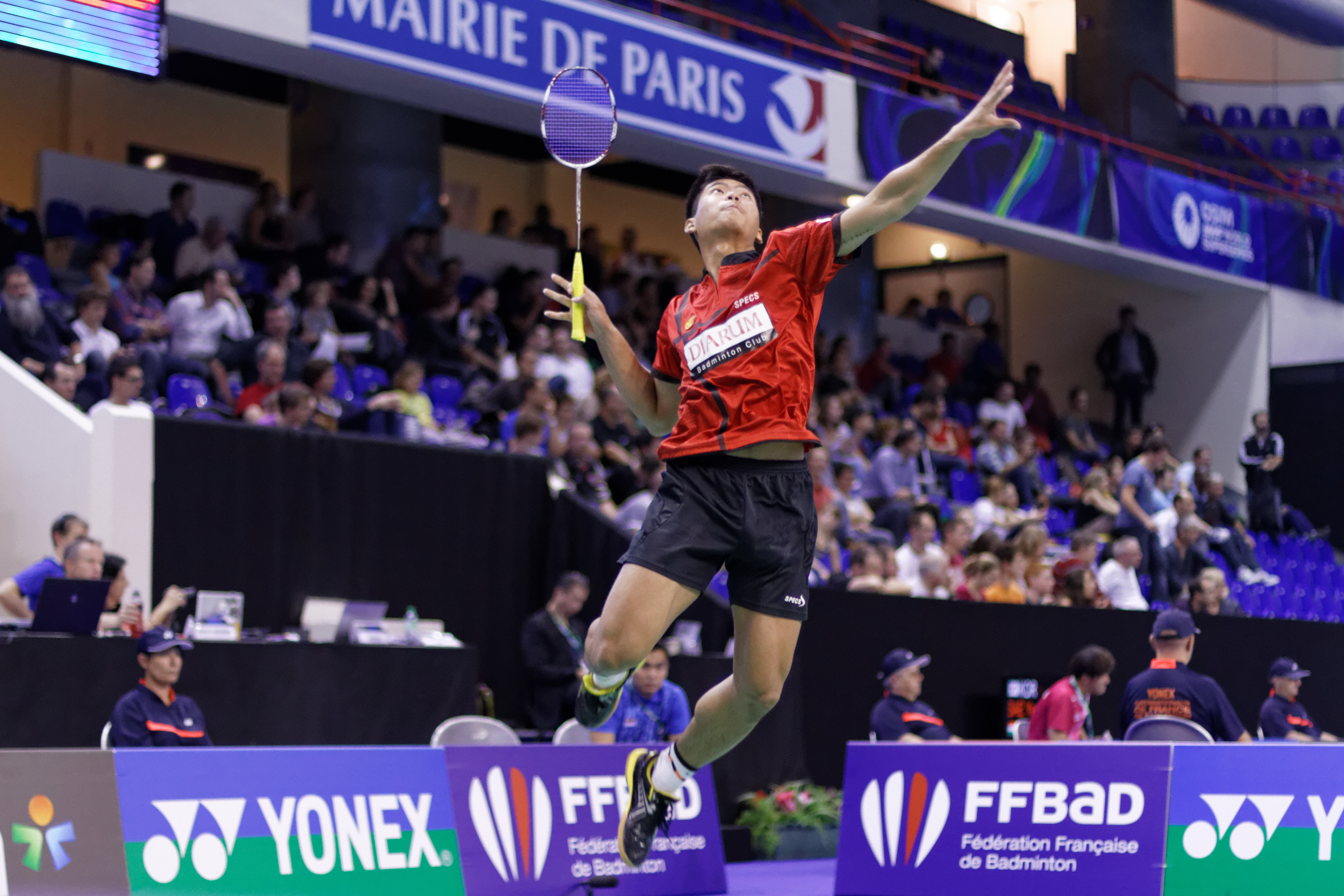
Jordan in 2013; he has been noted for his loose grip when smashing

In 2013 Jordan was paired with Vita Marissa, winning several international tournaments together. In the Korea Open they lost in the first round to Muhammad Rijal and Debby Susanto after coming through the qualifying rounds. They then defeated third seeds Rijal and Susanto in the second round of the Malaysia Open and Chinese fifth seeds Zhang Nan and Tang Jinhua. Jordan and Marissa then lost to Danish pair Joachim Fischer Nielsen and Christinna Pedersen in the semi-finals. They also reached the semifinals of the Singapore Open before losing to Tontowi Ahmad and Liliyana Natsir. At the BWF Grand Prix Gold and Grand Prix tournament level, they won three titles in New Zealand, Malaysia, and Indonesia.

=== 2014 ===
After the end of his successful in the 2013 season, the Badminton Association of Indonesia called him up to join the national team, partnering him with Debby Susanto. This was his first time joined the Indonesia national training centre. Jordan and Susanto then reached their first finals as a pair in the Malaysia Grand Prix Gold. In September, he and his partner stepped on the Asian Games podium, after clinched the bronze medal in the mixed doubles.

=== 2015 ===
Jordan started the 2015 season with partner Debby Susanto. They reached the finals in the Malaysia Masters Grand Prix Gold tournament, but lost to Danish pair Joachim Fischer Nielsen and Christinna Pedersen. They also reached the finals of Thailand Open Grand Prix Gold, but lost to Korean pair Choi Sol-gyu and Eom Hye-won. They then reached their first ever BWF Superseries finals in the French Open, and finished as runner-up lost to Ko Sung-hyun and Kim Ha-na of South Korea. In December, they also the finals of Indonesian Masters Grand Prix Gold, but lost to their teammate Tontowi Ahmad and Liliyana Natsir.

=== 2016 ===
In January, Jordan with partner Debby Susanto won the Syed Modi International Grand Prix Gold held in India. In March, they won their first All England title defeating Danish pair Joachim Fischer Nielsen and Christinna Pedersen.

Jordan competed in 2016 Summer Olympics in Rio de Janeiro with partner Debby Susanto. They became the runner-up of Group A, proceeding to the knocked-out stage. They lost at the quarter-finals to their country mate and eventual gold medalists, Tontowi Ahmad and Liliyana Natsir.

In November, they lost in the finals of Hong Kong Open Super Series by their teammate Tontowi Ahmad and Liliyana Natsir.

=== 2017 ===
In March, Jordan with partner Debby Susanto lost the finals of Swiss Open Grand Prix Gold from Thai pair Dechapol Puavaranukroh and Sapsiree Taerattanachai. In June, they lost the finals of Australian Open Super Series from Chinese pair Zheng Siwei and Chen Qingchen. In September, they won the finals of Korea Open Super Series from Chinese pair Wang Yilyu and Huang Dongping.

=== 2018–2019: new partnership with Melati Daeva Oktavianti ===
After the retirement of Debby Susanto, Jordan was paired with Melati Daeva Oktavianti. They lost to Chinese pair Zheng Siwei and Huang Yaqiong in the second round of the Malaysia Masters. They then became runners-up at the 2018 India Open. They finished the season ranked as world number 15.

In 2019, Jordan and Oktavianti lost again twice in a row at the India Open from Chinese pair Wang Yilyu and Huang Dongping. In May, they lost at the New Zealand Open from Malaysian pair Chan Peng Soon and Goh Liu Ying. In June, they reached third finals of the year at the Australian Open but lost to Wang and Huang again. In July, they reached the fourth finals at the Japan Open but had to lose from Wang and Huang again.

In October 2019, they won their first BWF World Tour title with Oktavianti at the Denmark Open. The duo upset the current World Champions Zheng Siwei and Huang Yaqiong in the quarter-finals, and defeated world number 2 Wang and Huang in the finals. This victory was their first win over them, bringing their head-to-head record to 1–6. A week later, the duo again overcame the world number 1 Zheng and Huang to claim the French Open title. Jordan and Oktavianti have continued on the upward track this season, breaking into the top 5 of the BWF world ranking.

=== 2020–2022: Olympics debut, national team dismissal, new start with PB Djarum ===
In 2020, Jordan won his second All England Open title. Partnered with Oktavianti, they defeated Thai pair Dechapol Puavaranukroh and Sapsiree Taerattanachai in the final. They did not compete in further tournaments due to the COVID-19 pandemic.

In January 2021, Jordan and Oktavianti, finished as runner-ups at the Yonex Thailand Open to Puavaranukroh and Taerattanachai. They competed at the 2020 Summer Olympics but they were eliminated in the quarter-finals. In November, they lost at the Hylo Open in Germany from Thai pair Puavaranukroh and Taerattanachai in the final. Jordan and Oktavianti's loss at the first round of home tournament Indonesia Masters sparked controversy after Nova Widianto's criticism over the pair during the press conference, where Widianto expressed his dissatisfaction over their performance due to 'communication problems' and a perceived 'lack of fighting spirit'. They ended up exiting the Indonesia Open at the second round. Jordan and Oktavianti participated at the World Tour Finals, but failed to proceed to the knockout stage with two losses (against Puavaranukroh and Taerattanachai, and against Tang Chun Man and Tse Ying Suet) and one win (against Marcus Ellis and Lauren Smith).

In January 2022, the Badminton Association of Indonesia announced Jordan and Oktavianti's dismissal from the national team. They continued playing under PB Djarum, guided by coach Vita Marissa, in which they reached the quarterfinals of the All England Open. Their ranked qualified them for the Asian Championships in Manila, where they reached the semi-finals but had to retire mid-match due to Jordan's hip injury. Jordan's condition worsened to the point that the duo had to retire from the Indonesia Open second round. He underwent surgery to remedy the radiculopathy in his spine and was treated with vertebral fixation. Jordan did not compete in any other tournaments in 2022 to focus on post-surgery rehabilitation. In August, the Badminton World Federation approved Jordan and Oktavianti's application for a 'protected rank', which allows them to retain their world rank of #5 for six months.

=== 2023 ===
In January, Jordan finally returned to the badminton court at the Indonesia Masters, but lost at the first round Chinese pair Feng Yanzhe and Huang Dongping.

In March, Jordan and Oktavianti competed in the European tour, but unfortunately lost in the second round of German Open from 5th seed Chinese pair Feng Yanzhe and Huang Dongping in two consecutive meeting. In the next tour, they competed in the All England Open but lost in the second round from 3rd seed Thai pair Dechapol Puavaranukroh and Sapsiree Taerattanachai. In the next tour, they competed in the Swiss Open but lost in the first round from 6th seed Malaysian pair Goh Soon Huat and Shevon Jemie Lai. In the next tour, they competed in the Spain Masters, but had to lose in the finals from 8th Danish pair Mathias Christiansen and Alexandra Bøje.

In late April, Jordan and Oktavianti competed at the Asian Championships in Dubai, United Arab Emirates, but had to lose in the quarter-finals from 1st seed and eventual finalist Chinese pair Zheng Siwei and Huang Yaqiong.

In late May, Jordan and Oktavianti competed in the second Asian Tour at the Malaysia Masters. Unfortunately, they lost in the second round from Chinese pair Jiang Zhenbang and Wei Yaxin in rubber games.

In June, Jordan and Oktavianti competed at the Singapore Open, but lost in the first round from fellow Indonesian pair Rinov Rivaldy and Pitha Haningtyas Mentari. In the next tour, they competed at the home tournament, Indonesia Open, but lost in the second round from Hong Konger pair Tang Chun Man and Tse Ying Suet in straight matches.

In July, Jordan and Oktavianti competed at the Korea Open, but lost in the second round from first seeds Zheng Siwei and Huang Yaqiong. In the next tour, they competed at Japan Open, but lost in the first round from 3rd seed Japanese pair Yuta Watanabe and Arisa Higashino in straight games.

In early August, Jordan and Oktavianti competed at the Australian Open, but exited in the second round from Hong Kong pair Tang Chun Man and Tse Ying Suet in straight games.

== Awards and nominations ==
Award	Year	Category	Result	Ref.
BWF Awards	2019	Most Improved Player of the Year with Melati Daeva Oktavianti	Nominated	

== Achievements ==
=== Asian Games ===
Mixed doubles
Year	Venue	Partner	Opponent	Score	Result	Ref.
2014	Gyeyang Gymnasium; Incheon, South Korea	(Indonesia) Debby Susanto	(China) Zhang Nan (China) Zhao Yunlei	19–21, 17–21	Bronze	

=== Asian Championships ===
Mixed doubles
Year	Venue	Partner	Opponent	Score	Result	Ref.
2022	Muntinlupa Sports Complex; Metro Manila, Philippines	(Indonesia) Melati Daeva Oktavianti	(China) Zheng Siwei (China) Huang Yaqiong	8–21 retired	Bronze	

=== SEA Games ===
Mixed doubles
Year	Venue	Partner	Opponent	Score	Result	Ref.
2015	Singapore Indoor Stadium, Singapore	(Indonesia) Debby Susanto	(Malaysia) Chan Peng Soon (Malaysia) Goh Liu Ying	18–21, 21–13, 25–23	Gold	
2019	Muntinlupa Sports Complex; Metro Manila, Philippines	(Indonesia) Melati Daeva Oktavianti	(Malaysia) Goh Soon Huat (Malaysia) Shevon Jemie Lai	21–19, 19–21, 23–21	Gold	

=== Asian Junior Championships ===
Mixed doubles
Year	Venue	Partner	Opponent	Score	Result	Ref.
2011	Babu Banarasi Das Indoor Stadium; Lucknow, India	(Indonesia) Tiara Rosalia Nuraidah	(China) Pei Tianyi (China) Ou Dongni	14–21, 21–23	Bronze	

=== BWF World Tour (3 titles, 8 runners-up) ===
The BWF World Tour, which was announced on 19 March 2017 and implemented in 2018, is a series of elite badminton tournaments sanctioned by the Badminton World Federation (BWF). The BWF World Tour is divided into levels of World Tour Finals, Super 1000, Super 750, Super 500, Super 300, and the BWF Tour Super 100.

Mixed doubles
Year	Tournament	Level	Partner	Opponent	Score	Result	Ref.
2018	India Open	Super 500	(Indonesia) Melati Daeva Oktavianti	(Denmark) Mathias Christiansen (Denmark) Christinna Pedersen	14–21, 15–21	(silver) Runner-up	
2019	India Open	Super 500	(Indonesia) Melati Daeva Oktavianti	(China) Wang Yilyu (China) Huang Dongping	13–21, 11–21	(silver) Runner-up	
2019	New Zealand Open	Super 300	(Indonesia) Melati Daeva Oktavianti	(Malaysia) Chan Peng Soon (Malaysia) Goh Liu Ying	14–21, 21–16, 27–29	(silver) Runner-up	
2019	Australian Open	Super 300	(Indonesia) Melati Daeva Oktavianti	(China) Wang Yilyu (China) Huang Dongping	15–21, 8–21	(silver) Runner-up	
2019	Japan Open	Super 750	(Indonesia) Melati Daeva Oktavianti	(China) Wang Yilyu (China) Huang Dongping	17–21, 16–21	(silver) Runner-up	
2019	Denmark Open	Super 750	(Indonesia) Melati Daeva Oktavianti	(China) Wang Yilyu (China) Huang Dongping	21–18, 18–21, 21–19	(gold) Winner	
2019	French Open	Super 750	(Indonesia) Melati Daeva Oktavianti	(China) Zheng Siwei (China) Huang Yaqiong	22–24, 21–16, 21–12	(gold) Winner	
2020	All England Open	Super 1000	(Indonesia) Melati Daeva Oktavianti	(Thailand) Dechapol Puavaranukroh (Thailand) Sapsiree Taerattanachai	21–15, 17–21, 21–8	(gold) Winner	
2020 (I)	Thailand Open	Super 1000	(Indonesia) Melati Daeva Oktavianti	(Thailand) Dechapol Puavaranukroh (Thailand) Sapsiree Taerattanachai	3–21, 22–20, 18–21	(silver) Runner-up	
2021	Hylo Open	Super 500	(Indonesia) Melati Daeva Oktavianti	(Thailand) Dechapol Puavaranukroh (Thailand) Sapsiree Taerattanachai	20–22, 14–21	(silver) Runner-up	
2023	Spain Masters	Super 300	(Indonesia) Melati Daeva Oktavianti	(Denmark) Mathias Christiansen (Denmark) Alexandra Bøje	20–22, 18–21	(silver) Runner-up	

=== BWF Superseries (2 titles, 3 runners-up) ===
The BWF Superseries, which was launched on 14 December 2006 and implemented in 2007, was a series of elite badminton tournaments, sanctioned by the Badminton World Federation (BWF). BWF Superseries levels were Superseries and Superseries Premier. A season of Superseries consisted of twelve tournaments around the world that had been introduced since 2011. Successful players were invited to the Superseries Finals, which were held at the end of each year.

Mixed doubles
Year	Tournament	Partner	Opponent	Score	Result	Ref.
2015	French Open	(Indonesia) Debby Susanto	(South Korea) Ko Sung-hyun (South Korea) Kim Ha-na	10–21, 21–15, 19–21	(silver) Runner-up	
2016	All England Open	(Indonesia) Debby Susanto	(Denmark) Joachim Fischer Nielsen (Denmark) Christinna Pedersen	21–12, 21–17	(gold) Winner	
2016	Hong Kong Open	(Indonesia) Debby Susanto	(Indonesia) Tontowi Ahmad (Indonesia) Liliyana Natsir	19–21, 17–21	(silver) Runner-up	
2017	Australia Open	(Indonesia) Debby Susanto	(China) Zheng Siwei (China) Chen Qingchen	21–18, 14–21, 17–21	(silver) Runner-up	
2017	Korea Open	(Indonesia) Debby Susanto	(China) Wang Yilyu (China) Huang Dongping	21–17, 21–18	(gold) Winner	

BWF Super Series Finals tournament
BWF Super Series Premier tournament
BWF Super Series tournament

=== BWF Grand Prix (4 titles, 5 runners-up) ===
The BWF Grand Prix had two levels, the Grand Prix and Grand Prix Gold. It was a series of badminton tournaments sanctioned by the Badminton World Federation (BWF) and played between 2007 and 2017.

Mixed doubles
Year	Tournament	Partner	Opponent	Score	Result	Ref.
2013	New Zealand Open	(Indonesia) Vita Marissa	(Indonesia) Riky Widianto (Indonesia) Richi Puspita Dili	21–18, 21–8	(gold) Winner	
2013	Malaysia Grand Prix Gold	(Indonesia) Vita Marissa	(Malaysia) Tan Aik Quan (Malaysia) Lai Pei Jing	20–22, 21–13, 21–17	(gold) Winner	
2013	Indonesia Grand Prix Gold	(Indonesia) Vita Marissa	(Indonesia) Tontowi Ahmad (Indonesia) Liliyana Natsir	22–20, 9–21, 21–14	(gold) Winner	
2014	Malaysia Grand Prix Gold	(Indonesia) Debby Susanto	(China) Lu Kai (China) Huang Yaqiong	14–21, 13–21	(silver) Runner-up	
2015	Malaysia Masters	(Indonesia) Debby Susanto	(Denmark) Joachim Fischer Nielsen (Denmark) Christinna Pedersen	18–21, 18–21	(silver) Runner-up	
2015	Thailand Open	(Indonesia) Debby Susanto	(South Korea) Choi Sol-gyu (South Korea) Eom Hye-won	19–21, 21–17, 16–21	(silver) Runner-up	
2015	Indonesia Masters	(Indonesia) Debby Susanto	(Indonesia) Tontowi Ahmad (Indonesia) Liliyana Natsir	18–21,13–21	(silver) Runner-up	
2016	Syed Modi International	(Indonesia) Debby Susanto	(Thailand) Dechapol Puavaranukroh (Thailand) Sapsiree Taerattanachai	23–25,21–9, 21–16	(gold) Winner	
2017	Swiss Open	(Indonesia) Debby Susanto	(Thailand) Dechapol Puavaranukroh (Thailand) Sapsiree Taerattanachai	18–21,15–21	(silver) Runner-up	

BWF Grand Prix Gold tournament
BWF Grand Prix tournament

=== BWF International Challenge/Series (1 title) ===
Men's doubles
Year	Tournament	Partner	Opponent	Score	Result	Ref.
2013	Indonesia International	(Indonesia) Didit Juang Indrianto	(Indonesia) Hardianto (Indonesia) Agripina Prima Rahmanto Putra	17–21, 21–16, 23–21	(gold) Winner	

BWF International Challenge tournament
BWF Future Series tournament

== Performance timeline ==
Key

W	Won	F	Finalist	SF	Semi-finalist
QF	Quarter-finalist	#R	Rounds 4, 3, 2, 1	RR	Round-robin stage
Q#	Qualification round	A	Absent	w/d	Withdrew
G	Gold	S	Silver	B	Bronze
NH	Not held	N/A	Not applicable	DNQ	Did not qualify

=== National team ===
- Junior level

Team event	2011	Ref
Asian Junior Championships	B	

- Senior level

Team events	2015	2016	2017	2018	2019	2020	2021
SEA Games	G	NH	A	NH	G	NH	A
Sudirman Cup	B	NH	RR	NH	B	NH	QF

=== Individual competitions ===
==== Junior level ====
- Boys' doubles

Event	2011	Ref
Asian Junior Championships	QF	

- Mixed doubles

Event	2011	Ref
Asian Junior Championships	B	

==== Senior level ====
===== Men's doubles =====
Tournament	Grand Prix Gold		Best
Tournament	2011	2012	Best
Indonesia Masters	1R	QF	QF ('12)
Year-end ranking	194	107	100

===== Mixed doubles =====
Events	2014	2015	2016	2017	2018	2019	2020	2021	2022	2023	Ref
SEA Games	NH	G	NH	A	NH	G	NH	A	NH	A	
Asian Championships	A	QF	2R	QF	1R	2R	NH		B	QF	
Asian Games	B	NH			A	NH				NH	
World Championships	QF	QF	NH	QF	3R	3R	NH	w/d	A	DNQ	
Olympic Games	NH		QF	NH			QF	NH			

Tournament	BWF Superseries / Grand Prix					BWF World Tour							Best	Ref
Tournament	2013	2014	2015	2016	2017	2018	2019	2020	2021	2022	2023	2024	Best	Ref
Malaysia Open	SF	QF	1R	2R	2R	1R	1R	NH		w/d	A		SF ('13)	
India Open	A	QF	SF	w/d	A	F	F	NH		A			F ('18, '19)	
Indonesia Masters	W	A	F	w/d	NH	SF	2R	QF	1R	2R	1R	A	W ('13)	
Thailand Masters	NH			1R	A				NH		A		1R ('16)	
German Open	A					QF	1R	NH		w/d	2R	A	QF ('18)	
French Open	QF	1R	F	QF	2R	2R	W	NH	QF	A	2R	A	W ('19)	
All England Open	2R	A	SF	W	1R	QF	SF	W	w/d	QF	2R	A	W ('16, '20)	
Orléans Masters	N/A					A		NH	A		w/d	A		
Swiss Open	A	QF	QF	w/d	F	A		NH	A	1R	1R	A	F ('17)	
Spain Masters	NH					A				NH	F	A	F ('23)	
Thailand Open	A	NH	F	A		QF	2R	F	NH	A			F ('15, '20)	
Thailand Open	A	NH	F	A		QF	2R	1R	NH	A			F ('15, '20)	
Malaysia Masters	W	F	F	1R	A	2R	QF	1R	NH	w/d	2R	A	W ('13)	
Singapore Open	SF	A	1R	QF	QF	A	2R	NH		A	1R	A	SF ('13)	
Indonesia Open	1R	2R	2R	1R	1R	1R	1R	NH	2R	2R	2R	A	2R ('14, '15, '21, '22, '23)	
Australian Open	1R	A	2R	SF	F	A	F	NH		A	2R	A	F ('17, '19)	
U.S. Open	A							NH			A	w/d	—	
Canada Open	A							NH		A		2R	2R ('24	
Japan Open	QF	2R	2R	w/d	SF	QF	F	NH		A	1R	A	F ('19)	
Korea Open	1R	A	2R	A	W	2R	QF	NH		A	2R	A	W ('17)	
Chinese Taipei Open	A		SF	A				NH		A			SF ('15)	
China Open	1R	2R	QF	QF	1R	1R	1R	NH			2R	A	QF ('15, '16)	
Hong Kong Open	QF	2R	QF	F	1R	QF	2R	NH			1R	A	F ('16)	
Vietnam Open	A		2R	A				NH		A			2R ('15)	
Arctic Open	N/A							NH			1R	A	1R ('23)	
Denmark Open	1R	2R	2R	QF	A	1R	W	A	SF	A	1R	A	W ('19)	
Hylo Open	A		QF	A				NH	F	A	1R	A	F ('21)	
Korea Masters	A					SF	A	NH		A			SF ('18)	
China Masters	QF	QF	A			QF	QF	NH			1R	A	QF ('13, '14, '18, '19)	
Syed Modi International	NH	A		W	A			NH		A	2R	A	W ('16)	
Superseries / World Tour Finals	DNQ		SF	SF	RR	DNQ	RR	RR	RR	DNQ			SF ('15, '16)	
New Zealand Open	W	A					F	NH					W ('13)	
Year-end ranking	7	12	8	5	7	15	5	4	5	47	27	322	2	
Tournament	2013	2014	2015	2016	2017	2018	2019	2020	2021	2022	2023	2024	Best	Ref

== Record against selected opponents ==
Mixed doubles results against World Superseries finalists, World Superseries Finals semifinalists, World Championships semifinalists, and Olympic quarter-finalists paired with:

=== Debby Susanto ===
- (China) Liu Cheng & Bao Yixin 3–2
- (China) Lu Kai & Huang Yaqiong 2–2
- (China) Xu Chen & Ma Jin 2–2
- (China) Zhang Nan & Li Yinhui 1–0
- (China) Zhang Nan & Zhao Yunlei 1–8
- (China) Zheng Siwei & Chen Qingchen 0–4
- (Denmark) Joachim Fischer Nielsen & Christinna Pedersen 6–6
- (England) Chris Adcock & Gabby Adcock 0–5
- (Hong Kong) Reginald Lee Chun Hei & Chau Hoi Wah 5–4
- (Indonesia) Riky Widianto & Richi Puspita Dili 2–0
- (Indonesia) Tontowi Ahmad & Liliyana Natsir 1–4
- (Japan) Kenta Kazuno & Ayane Kurihara 2–0
- (South Korea) Ko Sung-hyun & Kim Ha-na 4–4
- (South Korea) Yoo Yeon-seong & Chang Ye-na 1–0
- (Malaysia) Chan Peng Soon & Goh Liu Ying 1–1
- (Poland) Robert Mateusiak & Nadieżda Zięba 0–1

=== Vita Marissa ===
- (China) Xu Chen & Ma Jin 0–1
- (China) Zhang Nan & Zhao Yunlei 0–1
- (Denmark) Joachim Fischer Nielsen & Christinna Pedersen 0–2
- (England) Chris Adcock & Gabby Adcock 0–1
- (Hong Kong) Reginald Lee Chun Hei & Chau Hoi Wah 0–1
- (Indonesia) Riky Widianto & Richi Puspita Dili 2–1
- (Indonesia) Tontowi Ahmad & Liliyana Natsir 1–1
- (South Korea) Ko Sung-hyun & Kim Ha-na 1–0
- (South Korea) Yoo Yeon-seong & Chang Ye-na 0–1
- (Malaysia) Chan Peng Soon & Goh Liu Ying 1–0
- (Thailand) Sudket Prapakamol & Saralee Thungthongkam 1–0
