= 2020 All England Open =

2020 badminton tournament in Birmingham

Tournament details
- Dates: 11–15 March
- Edition: 110th
- Level: Super 1000
- Total prize money: US$1,100,000
- Venue: Arena Birmingham
- Location: Birmingham, England

Champions
- Men's singles: (Denmark) Viktor Axelsen
- Women's singles: (Chinese Taipei) Tai Tzu-ying
- Men's doubles: (Japan) Hiroyuki Endo (Japan) Yuta Watanabe
- Women's doubles: (Japan) Yuki Fukushima (Japan) Sayaka Hirota
- Mixed doubles: (Indonesia) Praveen Jordan (Indonesia) Melati Daeva Oktavianti

The 2020 All England Open (officially known as the Yonex All England Open Badminton Championships 2020 for sponsorship reasons) was a badminton tournament which took place at Arena Birmingham in England from 11 to 15 March 2020. It had a total purse of $1,100,000.

== Tournament ==
The 2020 All England Open became the fifth tournament of the 2020 BWF World Tour following the postponement of the 2020 German Open due to the ongoing coronavirus outbreak. It was a part of the All England Open championships, which had been held since 1899. This tournament was organized by Badminton England and sanctioned by the BWF.

=== Venue ===
This international tournament was held at Arena Birmingham in Birmingham, England.

=== Point distribution ===
Below is the point distribution for each phase of the tournament based on the BWF points system for the BWF World Tour Super 1000 event.

Winner	Runner-up	3/4	5/8	9/16	17/32
12,000	10,200	8,400	6,600	4,800	3,000

=== Prize money ===
The total prize money for this tournament was US$1,100,000. Distribution of prize money was in accordance with BWF regulations.

Event	Winner	Finals	Semi-finals	Quarter-finals	Last 16	Last 32
Singles	$77,000	$37,400	$15,400	$6,050	$3,300	$1,100
Doubles	$81,400	$38,500	$15,400	$6,875	$3,575	$1,100

== Men's singles ==
=== Seeds ===
1. (Chinese Taipei) Chou Tien-chen (final)
2. (Denmark) Viktor Axelsen (champion)
3. (China) Chen Long (quarter-finals)
4. (Indonesia) Anthony Sinisuka Ginting (first round)
5. (Denmark) Anders Antonsen (semi-finals)
6. (Indonesia) Jonatan Christie (first round)
7. (China) Shi Yuqi (quarter-finals)
8. (Hong Kong) Ng Ka Long (first round)

=== Finals ===
Semi-finals
1	(Chinese Taipei) Chou Tien-chen	17
5	(Denmark) Anders Antonsen	14^{r}
(Malaysia) Lee Zii Jia	21	13	19
2	(Denmark) Viktor Axelsen	17	21	21

Final
1	(Chinese Taipei) Chou Tien-chen	13	14
2	(Denmark) Viktor Axelsen	21	21

=== Top half ===
==== Section 1 ====
First Round
1	(Chinese Taipei) Chou T-c	21	21
PMD	(Netherlands) M Caljouw	19	17
(Japan) K Tsuneyama	21	16	21
PMD	(South Korea) Heo K-h	17	21	15
8	(Hong Kong) Ng K L	18	15
(Japan) K Nishimoto	21	21
(Chinese Taipei) Wang T-w	21	15	21
PMD	(Thailand) K Phetpradab	14	21	8

Second Round
1	(Chinese Taipei) Chou T-c	19	26	21
(Japan) K Tsuneyama	21	24	13
(Japan) K Nishimoto	16	16
(Chinese Taipei) Wang T-w	21	21

Quarter-finals
1	(Chinese Taipei) Chou T-c	21	21
(Chinese Taipei) Wang T-w	11	12

==== Section 2 ====
First Round
4	(Indonesia) A S Ginting	14	18
(Denmark) R Gemke	21	21
(Indonesia) S H Rhustavito	3
(India) Parupalli K	0^{r}
5	(Denmark) A Antonsen	22	21
(South Korea) Son W-h	20	13
(China) Huang YX	21	21
(Denmark) J Ø. Jørgensen	15	19

Second Round
(Denmark) R Gemke	18	21	21
(Indonesia) S H Rhustavito	21	13	19
5	(Denmark) A Antonsen	19	21	21
(China) Huang YX	21	12	15

Quarter-finals
(Denmark) R Gemke	10	13
5	(Denmark) A Antonsen	21	21

=== Bottom half ===
==== Section 3 ====
First Round
(China) Lu GZ	21	21
(Thailand) K Wangcharoen	16	9
(Malaysia) Lee Z J	21	21
6	(Indonesia) J Christie	15	13
(China) Lin D	13	22	21
(Thailand) K Vitidsarn	21	20	10
(India) S Kidambi	15	16
3	(China) Chen L	21	21

Second Round
(China) Lu GZ	10	16
(Malaysia) Lee Z J	21	21
(China) Lin D	17	8
3	(China) Chen L	21	21

Quarter-finals
(Malaysia) Lee Z J	21	21
3	(China) Chen L	12	18

==== Section 4 ====
First Round
(India) B. Sai Praneeth	12	13
(China) Zhao JP	21	21
(Indonesia) T Sugiarto	17	21	7
7	(China) Shi YQ	21	17	21
(Hong Kong) Lee C Y	21	8	17
(India) L Sen	17	21	21
(Thailand) S Thammasin	15	13
2	(Denmark) V Axelsen	21	21

Second Round
(China) Zhao JP	13	13
7	(China) Shi YQ	21	21
(India) L Sen	17	18
2	(Denmark) V Axelsen	21	21

Quarter-finals
7	(China) Shi YQ	15	8
2	(Denmark) V Axelsen	21	21

== Women's singles ==
=== Seeds ===
1. (China) Chen Yufei (final)
2. (Chinese Taipei) Tai Tzu-ying (champion)
3. (Japan) Akane Yamaguchi (quarter-finals)
4. (Japan) Nozomi Okuhara (semi-finals)
5. (Thailand) Ratchanok Intanon (quarter-finals)
6. (India) P. V. Sindhu (quarter-finals)
7. (China) He Bingjiao (second round)
8. (Spain) Carolina Marín (semi-finals)

=== Finals ===
Semi-finals
1	(China) Chen Yufei	21	23
4	(Japan) Nozomi Okuhara	14	21
8	(Spain) Carolina Marín	21	13	11
2	(Chinese Taipei) Tai Tzu-ying	19	21	21

Final
1	(China) Chen Yufei	19	15
2	(Chinese Taipei) Tai Tzu-ying	21	21

=== Top half ===
==== Section 1 ====
First Round
1	(China) Chen YF	14	21	21
(South Korea) An S-y	21	14	15
(Denmark) M Blichfeldt	15	21	16
(Thailand) B Ongbamrungphan	21	14	21
5	(Thailand) R Intanon	21	21
(Malaysia) S Cheah S Y	9	11
(Japan) A Ohori	12	21	21
(South Korea) Kim G-e	21	16	18

Second Round
1	(China) Chen YF	21	21
(Thailand) B Ongbamrungphan	17	13
5	(Thailand) R Intanon	21	21
(Japan) A Ohori	11	11

Quarter-finals
1	(China) Chen YF	17	21	21
5	(Thailand) R Intanon	21	15	17

==== Section 2 ====
First Round
4	(Japan) N Okuhara	21	21
(Canada) M Li	12	12
(Thailand) P Chaiwan	18	21	9
(Denmark) L Kjærsfeldt	21	19	21
6	(India) P. V. Sindhu	21	21
(United States) Zhang BW	14	17
(Thailand) N Jindapol	21	10
(South Korea) Sung J-h	23	21

Second Round
4	(Japan) N Okuhara	21	21
(Denmark) L Kjærsfeldt	12	16
6	(India) P. V. Sindhu	21	21
(South Korea) Sung J-h	19	15

Quarter-finals
4	(Japan) N Okuhara	12	21	21
6	(India) P. V. Sindhu	21	15	13

=== Bottom half ===
==== Section 3 ====
First Round
(Hong Kong) Cheung N Y	14	16
(China) Wang ZY	21	21
(China) Zhang YM	13	14
8	(Spain) C Marín	21	21
(Japan) S Takahashi	21	21
(Russia) E Kosetskaya	12	9
(India) S Nehwal	11	8
3	(Japan) A Yamaguchi	21	21

Second Round
(China) Wang ZY	13	14
8	(Spain) C Marín	21	21
(Japan) S Takahashi	13	15
3	(Japan) A Yamaguchi	21	21

Quarter-finals
8	(Spain) C Marín	21	21
3	(Japan) A Yamaguchi	15	12

==== Section 4 ====
First Round
(China) Han Y	17	21	22
(Thailand) P Chochuwong	21	14	24
(Scotland) K Gilmour	10	16
7	(China) He BJ	21	21
(Indonesia) G M Tunjung	21	21
(Singapore) Yeo J M	12	17
(China) Cai YY	21	19	8
2	(Chinese Taipei) Tai T-y	14	21	21

Second Round
(Thailand) P Chochuwong	17	21	21
7	(China) He BJ	21	18	12
(Indonesia) G M Tunjung	20	16
2	(Chinese Taipei) Tai T-y	22	21

Quarter-finals
(Thailand) P Chochuwong	9	11
2	(Chinese Taipei) Tai T-y	21	21

== Men's doubles ==
=== Seeds ===
1. (Indonesia) Marcus Fernaldi Gideon / Kevin Sanjaya Sukamuljo (final)
2. (Indonesia) Mohammad Ahsan / Hendra Setiawan (quarter-finals)
3. (China) Li Junhui / Liu Yuchen (second round)
4. (Japan) Takeshi Kamura / Keigo Sonoda (second round)
5. (Indonesia) Fajar Alfian / Muhammad Rian Ardianto (second round)
6. (Japan) Hiroyuki Endo / Yuta Watanabe (champions)
7. (Chinese Taipei) Lee Yang / Wang Chi-lin (semi-finals)
8. (Malaysia) Aaron Chia / Soh Wooi Yik (quarter-finals)

=== Finals ===
Semi-finals
1	(Indonesia) Marcus Fernaldi Gideon (Indonesia) Kevin Sanjaya Sukamuljo	21	21
7	(Chinese Taipei) Lee Yang (Chinese Taipei) Wang Chi-lin	18	13
(Russia) Vladimir Ivanov (Russia) Ivan Sozonov	16	15
6	(Japan) Hiroyuki Endo (Japan) Yuta Watanabe	21	21

Final
1	(Indonesia) Marcus Fernaldi Gideon (Indonesia) Kevin Sanjaya Sukamuljo	18	21	19
6	(Japan) Hiroyuki Endo (Japan) Yuta Watanabe	21	12	21

=== Top half ===
==== Section 1 ====
First Round
1	(Indonesia) M F Gideon (Indonesia) K S Sukamuljo	21	20	21
PMD	(Canada) J Ho-shue (Canada) N Yakura	18	22	14
(South Korea) Ko S-h (South Korea) Shin B-c	19	17
(China) Ou XY (China) Zhang N	21	21
8	(Malaysia) A Chia (Malaysia) Soh W Y	21	21
(Malaysia) Goh S F (Malaysia) N Izzuddin	15	17
(Denmark) K Astrup (Denmark) A S Rasmussen	20	21	16
(Chinese Taipei) Lu C-y (Chinese Taipei) Yang P-ha	22	14	21

Second Round
1	(Indonesia) M F Gideon (Indonesia) K S Sukamuljo	21	21
(China) Ou XY (China) Zhang N	9	15
8	(Malaysia) A Chia (Malaysia) Soh W Y	24	21
(Chinese Taipei) Lu C-y (Chinese Taipei) Yang P-ha	22	17

Quarter-finals
1	(Indonesia) M F Gideon (Indonesia) K S Sukamuljo	21	21
8	(Malaysia) A Chia (Malaysia) Soh W Y	17	19

==== Section 2 ====
First Round
3	(China) Li JH (China) Liu YC	21	19	21
(Indonesia) W Nayaka (Indonesia) A Yusuf	13	21	8
(South Korea) Kim G-j (South Korea) Lee Y-d	19	15
(China) Huang KX (China) Liu C	21	21
7	(Chinese Taipei) Lee Y (Chinese Taipei) Wang C-l	21	21
(Germany) M Lamsfuß (Germany) M E Seidel	16	13
(Malaysia) Ong Y S (Malaysia) Teo E Y	19	21	21
(China) He JT (China) Tan Q	21	15	12

Second Round
3	(China) Li JH (China) Liu YC	9	21	17
(China) Huang KX (China) Liu C	21	14	21
7	(Chinese Taipei) Lee Y (Chinese Taipei) Wang C-l	21	21
(Malaysia) Ong Y S (Malaysia) Teo E Y	19	16

Quarter-finals
(China) Huang KX (China) Liu C	21	18	14
7	(Chinese Taipei) Lee Y (Chinese Taipei) Wang C-l	18	21	21

=== Bottom half ===
==== Section 3 ====
First Round
(China) Di ZJ (China) Wang C	18	21	16
(England) M Ellis (England) C Langridge	21	13	21
(Denmark) M Boe (Denmark) M Conrad-Petersen	17	19
5	(Indonesia) F Alfian (Indonesia) M R Ardianto	21	21
(China) Han CK (China) Zhou HD	15	20
(Russia) V Ivanov (Russia) I Sozonov	21	22
(Chinese Taipei) Liao M-c (Chinese Taipei) Su C-h	12	23	10
4	(Japan) T Kamura (Japan) K Sonoda	21	21	21

Second Round
(England) M Ellis (England) C Langridge	21	21
5	(Indonesia) F Alfian (Indonesia) M R Ardianto	14	15
(Russia) V Ivanov (Russia) I Sozonov	21	15	21
4	(Japan) T Kamura (Japan) K Sonoda	14	21	19

Quarter-finals
(England) M Ellis (England) C Langridge	18	21	8
(Russia) V Ivanov (Russia) I Sozonov	21	11	21

==== Section 4 ====
First Round
PMD	(Netherlands) J Maas (Netherlands) R Tabeling	14	13
(Chinese Taipei) Lee J-h (Chinese Taipei) Yang P-hs	21	21
(England) B Lane (England) S Vendy	14	12
6	(Japan) H Endo (Japan) Y Watanabe	21	21
(South Korea) Choi S-g (South Korea) Seo S-j	22	21	19
(Japan) T Hoki (Japan) Y Kobayashi	24	19	21
(Japan) A Koga (Japan) T Saito	21	13	23
2	(Indonesia) M Ahsan (Indonesia) H Setiawan	12	21	25

Second Round
(Chinese Taipei) Lee J-h (Chinese Taipei) Yang P-hs	11	12
6	(Japan) H Endo (Japan) Y Watanabe	21	21
(Japan) T Hoki (Japan) Y Kobayashi	21	15	14
2	(Indonesia) M Ahsan (Indonesia) H Setiawan	14	21	21

Quarter-finals
6	(Japan) H Endo (Japan) Y Watanabe	21	21
2	(Indonesia) M Ahsan (Indonesia) H Setiawan	19	18

== Women's doubles ==
=== Seeds ===
1. (China) Chen Qingchen / Jia Yifan (quarter-finals)
2. (Japan) Mayu Matsumoto / Wakana Nagahara (quarter-finals)
3. (Japan) Yuki Fukushima / Sayaka Hirota (champions)
4. (South Korea) Lee So-hee / Shin Seung-chan (semi-finals)
5. (South Korea) Kim So-yeong / Kong Hee-yong (quarter-finals)
6. (China) Du Yue / Li Yinhui (final)
7. (Japan) Misaki Matsutomo / Ayaka Takahashi (semi-finals)
8. (Indonesia) Greysia Polii / Apriyani Rahayu (first round)

=== Finals ===
Semi-finals
7	(Japan) Misaki Matsutomo (Japan) Ayaka Takahashi	12	12
3	(Japan) Yuki Fukushima (Japan) Sayaka Hirota	21	21
4	(South Korea) Lee So-hee (South Korea) Shin Seung-chan	17	17
6	(China) Du Yue (China) Li Yinhui	21	21

Final
3	(Japan) Yuki Fukushima (Japan) Sayaka Hirota	21	21
6	(China) Du Yue (China) Li Yinhui	13	15

=== Top half ===
==== Section 1 ====
First Round
1	(China) Chen QC (China) Jia YF	21	21
(Bulgaria) G Stoeva (Bulgaria) S Stoeva	11	12
(Germany) L Efler (Germany) I Herttrich	18	14
(England) C Birch (England) L Smith	21	21
7	(Japan) M Matsutomo (Japan) A Takahashi	21	21
(Sweden) E Karlsson (Sweden) J Magnusson	13	13
PMD	(England) J Moore (England) V Williams	4^{r}
(India) A Ponnappa (India) N. S Reddy	5

Second Round
1	(China) Chen QC (China) Jia YF	21	22
(England) C Birch (England) L Smith	16	20
7	(Japan) M Matsutomo (Japan) A Takahashi	21	21
(India) A Ponnappa (India) N. S Reddy	13	14

Quarter-finals
1	(China) Chen QC (China) Jia YF	12	22	12
7	(Japan) M Matsutomo (Japan) A Takahashi	21	20	21

==== Section 2 ====
First Round
3	(Japan) Y Fukushima (Japan) S Hirota	21	21
(China) Liu XX (China) Xia YT	10	6
(Russia) E Bolotova (Russia) A Davletova	13	6
(South Korea) Baek H-n (South Korea) Jung K-e	21	21
5	(South Korea) Kim S-y (South Korea) Kong H-y	21	22
(Thailand) P Supajirakul (Thailand) S Taerattanachai	14	20
PMD	(Denmark) J Finne-Ipsen (Denmark) M Surrow	15	14
(Thailand) J Kititharakul (Thailand) R Prajongjai	21	21

Second Round
3	(Japan) Y Fukushima (Japan) S Hirota	16	21	21
(South Korea) Baek H-n (South Korea) Jung K-e	21	11	12
5	(South Korea) Kim S-y (South Korea) Kong H-y	21	21
(Thailand) J Kititharakul (Thailand) R Prajongjai	13	15

Quarter-finals
3	(Japan) Y Fukushima (Japan) S Hirota	21	23
5	(South Korea) Kim S-y (South Korea) Kong H-y	17	21

=== Bottom half ===
==== Section 3 ====
First Round
PMD	(Switzerland) N Fankhauser (Netherlands) I Tabeling	13	17
(Malaysia) V Hoo K M (Malaysia) Yap C W	21	21
(South Korea) Chang Y-n (South Korea) Kim H-r	21	21
8	(Indonesia) G Polii (Indonesia) A Rahayu	17	15
PMD	(Egypt) D Hany (Egypt) H Hosny	8	11
(Indonesia) S F S Ramadhanti (Indonesia) R Sugiarto	21	21
(Chinese Taipei) Hsu Y-c (Chinese Taipei) Hu L-f	16	15
4	(South Korea) Lee S-h (South Korea) Shin S-c	21	21

Second Round
(Malaysia) V Hoo K M (Malaysia) Yap C W	23	17	14
(South Korea) Chang Y-n (South Korea) Kim H-r	21	21	21
(Indonesia) S F S Ramadhanti (Indonesia) R Sugiarto	8	18
4	(South Korea) Lee S-h (South Korea) Shin S-c	21	21

Quarter-finals
(South Korea) Chang Y-n (South Korea) Kim H-r	17	23	11
4	(South Korea) Lee S-h (South Korea) Shin S-c	21	21	21

==== Section 4 ====
First Round
(Malaysia) Chow M K (Malaysia) Lee M Y	15	21	21
(China) Li WM (China) Zheng Y	21	15	18
(Canada) R Honderich (Canada) K Tsai	9	17
6	(China) Du Y (China) Li YH	21	21
(Russia) A Akchurina (Russia) O Morozova	15	17
(Japan) N Matsuyama (Japan) C Shida	21	21
(Netherlands) S Piek (Netherlands) C Seinen	12	12
2	(Japan) M Matsumoto (Japan) W Nagahara	21	21

Second Round
(Malaysia) Chow M K (Malaysia) Lee M Y	10	16
6	(China) Du Y (China) Li YH	21	21
(Japan) N Matsuyama (Japan) C Shida	21	18	17
2	(Japan) M Matsumoto (Japan) W Nagahara	17	21	21

Quarter-finals
6	(China) Du Y (China) Li YH	14	21	21
2	(Japan) M Matsumoto (Japan) W Nagahara	21	18	13

== Mixed doubles ==
=== Seeds ===
1. (China) Zheng Siwei / Huang Yaqiong (second round)
2. (China) Wang Yilyu / Huang Dongping (quarter-finals)
3. (Thailand) Dechapol Puavaranukroh / Sapsiree Taerattanachai (final)
4. (Japan) Yuta Watanabe / Arisa Higashino (second round)
5. (Indonesia) Praveen Jordan / Melati Daeva Oktavianti (champions)
6. (South Korea) Seo Seung-jae / Chae Yoo-jung (semi-finals)
7. (Malaysia) Chan Peng Soon / Goh Liu Ying (first round)
8. (Indonesia) Hafiz Faizal / Gloria Emanuelle Widjaja (quarter-finals)

=== Finals ===
Semi-finals
6	(South Korea) Seo Seung-jae (South Korea) Chae Yoo-jung	18	21	19
3	(Thailand) Dechapol Puavaranukroh (Thailand) Sapsiree Taerattanachai	21	17	21
(England) Marcus Ellis (England) Lauren Smith	15	23	11
5	(Indonesia) Praveen Jordan (Indonesia) Melati Daeva Oktavianti	21	21	21

Final
3	(Thailand) Dechapol Puavaranukroh (Thailand) Sapsiree Taerattanachai	15	21	8
5	(Indonesia) Praveen Jordan (Indonesia) Melati Daeva Oktavianti	21	17	21

=== Top half ===
==== Section 1 ====
First Round
1	(China) Zheng SW (China) Huang YQ	21	11	21
(India) P Chopra (India) N. S Reddy	13	21	17
(Netherlands) R Tabeling (Netherlands) S Piek	21	22
(Denmark) M Christiansen (Denmark) A Bøje	10	20
6	(South Korea) Seo S-j (South Korea) Chae Y-j	21	21
(Malaysia) Goh S H (Malaysia) S J Lai	12	13
(China) Guo XW (China) Zhang SX	7	16
(Germany) M Lamsfuß (Germany) I Herttrich	21	21

Second Round
1	(China) Zheng SW (China) Huang YQ	20	17
(Netherlands) R Tabeling (Netherlands) S Piek	22	21
6	(South Korea) Seo S-j (South Korea) Chae Y-j	21	21
(Germany) M Lamsfuß (Germany) I Herttrich	18	15

Quarter-finals
(Netherlands) R Tabeling (Netherlands) S Piek	16	19
6	(South Korea) Seo S-j (South Korea) Chae Y-j	21	21

==== Section 2 ====
First Round
3	(Thailand) D Puavaranukroh (Thailand) S Taerattanachai	21	21
(France) R Labar (France) A Tran	12	11
(Chinese Taipei) Lee J-h (Chinese Taipei) Hsu Y-c	21	21
PMD	(Denmark) M Bay-Smidt (Denmark) R Søby Hansen	19	9
8	(Indonesia) H Faizal (Indonesia) G E Widjaja	21	17	21
(England) C Adcock (England) G Adcock	19	21	12
(France) T Gicquel (France) D Delrue	21	21
(Indonesia) A Maulana (Indonesia) M C Bandaso	13	13

Second Round
3	(Thailand) D Puavaranukroh (Thailand) S Taerattanachai	21	21
(Chinese Taipei) Lee J-h (Chinese Taipei) Hsu Y-c	15	7
8	(Indonesia) H Faizal (Indonesia) G E Widjaja	21	21
(France) T Gicquel (France) D Delrue	15	12

Quarter-finals
3	(Thailand) D Puavaranukroh (Thailand) S Taerattanachai	21	21
8	(Indonesia) H Faizal (Indonesia) G E Widjaja	17	11

=== Bottom half ===
==== Section 3 ====
First Round
(Hong Kong) Tang C M (Hong Kong) Tse Y S	21	21
(Republic of Ireland) S Magee (Republic of Ireland) C Magee	11	12
(Indonesia) R Rivaldy (Indonesia) P H Mentari	21	21
7	(Malaysia) Chan P S (Malaysia) Goh L Y	16	11
(England) M Ellis (England) L Smith	21	21
(Japan) T Hoki (Japan) W Nagahara	9	15
(South Korea) Ko S-h (South Korea) Eom H-w	21	14
4	(Japan) Y Watanabe (Japan) A Higashino	23	21

Second Round
(Hong Kong) Tang C M (Hong Kong) Tse Y S	19	21	21
(Indonesia) R Rivaldy (Indonesia) P H Mentari	21	12	13
(England) M Ellis (England) L Smith	21	21
4	(Japan) Y Watanabe (Japan) A Higashino	15	10

Quarter-finals
(Hong Kong) Tang C M (Hong Kong) Tse Y S	26	20	11
(England) M Ellis (England) L Smith	24	22	21

==== Section 4 ====
First Round
(Canada) J Hurlburt-Yu (Canada) J Wu	16	11
(Malaysia) Tan K M (Malaysia) Lai P J	21	21
(Chinese Taipei) Wang C-l (Chinese Taipei) Cheng C-y	9	18
5	(Indonesia) P Jordan (Indonesia) M D Oktavianti	21	21
(Chinese Taipei) Yang P-hs (Chinese Taipei) Hu L-f	21	21
PMD	(Egypt) A H Elgamal (Egypt) D Hany	5	13
(Russia) R Alimov (Russia) A Davletova	15	18
2	(China) Wang YL (China) Huang DP	21	21

Second Round
(Malaysia) Tan K M (Malaysia) Lai P J	19	21	10
5	(Indonesia) P Jordan (Indonesia) M D Oktavianti	21	18	21
(Chinese Taipei) Yang P-hs (Chinese Taipei) Hu L-f	8	15
2	(China) Wang YL (China) Huang DP	21	21

Quarter-finals
5	(Indonesia) P Jordan (Indonesia) M D Oktavianti	15	21	21
2	(China) Wang YL (China) Huang DP	21	19	19

Preceded by 2020 German Open (original); 2020 Spain Masters (eventual)	BWF World Tour; 2020 BWF season	Succeeded by 2020 Swiss Open (original); 2020 Denmark Open (eventual)
