= 2019 French Open (badminton) =

2019 badminton tournament in Paris

Tournament details
- Dates: 22–27 October
- Level: Super 750
- Total prize money: US$750,000
- Venue: Stade Pierre de Coubertin
- Location: Paris, France

Champions
- Men's singles: (China) Chen Long
- Women's singles: (South Korea) An Se-young
- Men's doubles: (Indonesia) Marcus Fernaldi Gideon (Indonesia) Kevin Sanjaya Sukamuljo
- Women's doubles: (South Korea) Lee So-hee (South Korea) Shin Seung-chan
- Mixed doubles: (Indonesia) Praveen Jordan (Indonesia) Melati Daeva Oktavianti

The 2019 French Open (officially known as the Yonex French Open 2019 for sponsorship reasons) was a badminton competition which took place at Stade Pierre de Coubertin in Paris, France, from 22 to 27 October 2019. It had a total purse of $750,000.

== Tournament ==
The 2019 French Open was the twenty-first tournament of the 2019 BWF World Tour and also part of the French Open championships, which has been held since 1935. This tournament was organized by French Badminton Federation with the sanction of the BWF.

=== Venue ===
This international tournament was held at Stade Pierre de Coubertin in Paris, France.

=== Point distribution ===
Below is the point distribution table for each phase of the tournament based on the BWF points system for the BWF World Tour Super 750 event.

Winner	Runner-up	3/4	5/8	9/16	17/32
11,000	9,350	7,700	6,050	4,320	2,660

=== Prize money ===
The total prize money for this tournament was US$750,000. Distribution of prize money was in accordance with BWF regulations.

Event	Winner	Finals	Semi-finals	Quarter-finals	Last 16	Last 32
Singles	$52,500	$25,500	$10,500	$4,125	$2,250	$750
Doubles	$55,500	$26,250	$10,500	$4,687.50	$2,437.50	$750

== Men's singles ==
=== Seeds ===
1. (Japan) Kento Momota (quarter-finals)
2. (Chinese Taipei) Chou Tien-chen (second round)
3. (China) Shi Yuqi (withdrew)
4. (Denmark) Anders Antonsen (quarter-finals)
5. (China) Chen Long (champion)
6. (Indonesia) Jonatan Christie (final)
7. (Denmark) Viktor Axelsen (semi-finals)
8. (Indonesia) Anthony Sinisuka Ginting (semi-finals)

=== Finals ===
Semi-finals
8	(Indonesia) Anthony Sinisuka Ginting	19	18
5	(China) Chen Long	21	21
6	(Indonesia) Jonatan Christie	7	22	21
7	(Denmark) Viktor Axelsen	21	20	19

Final
5	(China) Chen Long	21	21
6	(Indonesia) Jonatan Christie	19	12

=== Top half ===
==== Section 1 ====
First Round
1	(Japan) K Momota	15	21	21
(Chinese Taipei) Wang T-w	21	15	16
(Thailand) K Wangcharoen	10	15
(Denmark) H-K Vittinghus	21	21
8	(Indonesia) A S Ginting	21	21
(Malaysia) Lee Z J	16	8
(China) Huang YX	21	19	21
(Thailand) K Phetpradab	10	21	12

Second Round
1	(Japan) K Momota	17	21	21
(Denmark) H-K Vittinghus	21	19	4
8	(Indonesia) A S Ginting	21	21
(China) Huang YX	11	10

Quarter-finals
1	(Japan) K Momota	10	19
8	(Indonesia) A S Ginting	21	21

==== Section 2 ====
First Round
PFR	(India) S Dey	15	21	21
(Indonesia) T Sugiarto	21	14	17
(Thailand) S Thammasin	21	18
(Indonesia) S H Rhustavito	23	21
5	(China) Chen L	21	21
(Denmark) R Gemke	14	12
PFR	(France) B Leverdez	12	9
(China) Lin D	21	21

Second Round
PFR	(India) S Dey	6	13
(Indonesia) S H Rhustavito	21	21
5	(China) Chen L	21	21
(China) Lin D	15	16

Quarter-finals
(Indonesia) S H Rhustavito	19	12
5	(China) Chen L	21	21

=== Bottom half ===
==== Section 3 ====
First Round
(Hong Kong) Lee C Y	21	16	16
(Netherlands) M Caljouw	18	21	16^{r}
(Denmark) J Ø. Jørgensen	15	16
6	(Indonesia) J Christie	21	21
(Japan) K Nishimoto	20	21	21
(India) S Verma	22	18	18
PFR	(Israel) M Zilberman	10	8
4	(Denmark) A Antonsen	21	21

Second Round
(Hong Kong) Lee C Y	21	20	15
6	(Indonesia) J Christie	17	22	21
(Japan) K Nishimoto	19	18
4	(Denmark) A Antonsen	21	21

Quarter-finals
6	(Indonesia) J Christie	17	21	21
4	(Denmark) A Antonsen	21	19	16

==== Section 4 ====
First Round
(Hong Kong) Wong W K	15	7
(Japan) K Tsuneyama	21	21
PFR	(France) T Rouxel	9	6
7	(Denmark) V Axelsen	21	21
(India) P Kashyap	11	9
(Hong Kong) Ng K L	21	21
(India) S Kidambi	21	7	14
2	(Chinese Taipei) Chou T-c	15	21	21

Second Round
(Japan) K Tsuneyama	9	21	15
7	(Denmark) V Axelsen	21	11	21
(Hong Kong) Ng K L	23	21	21
2	(Chinese Taipei) Chou T-c	25	17	16

Quarter-finals
7	(Denmark) V Axelsen	21	21
(Hong Kong) Ng K L	17	16

== Women's singles ==
=== Seeds ===
1. (Chinese Taipei) Tai Tzu-ying (semi-finals)
2. (Japan) Akane Yamaguchi (semi-finals)
3. (Japan) Nozomi Okuhara (second round)
4. (China) Chen Yufei (withdrew)
5. (India) P. V. Sindhu (quarter-finals)
6. (Thailand) Ratchanok Intanon (quarter-finals)
7. (China) He Bingjiao (quarter-finals)
8. (India) Saina Nehwal (quarter-finals)

=== Finals ===
Semi-finals
1	(Chinese Taipei) Tai Tzu-ying	16	9
(Spain) Carolina Marín	21	21
(South Korea) An Se-young	21	23
2	(Japan) Akane Yamaguchi	17	21

Final
(Spain) Carolina Marín	21	18	5
(South Korea) An Se-young	16	21	21

=== Top half ===
==== Section 1 ====
First Round
1	(Chinese Taipei) Tai T-y	21	13	21
PFR	(Germany) Y Li	7	21	12
(United States) Zhang B	15	16
(South Korea) Kim G-e	21	21
5	(India) P. V. Sindhu	21	21
(Canada) M Li	15	13
(Singapore) Yeo J M	21	21
(Malaysia) S Cheah S Y	15	16

Second Round
1	(Chinese Taipei) Tai T-y	21	21
(South Korea) Kim G-e	17	17
5	(India) P. V. Sindhu	21	21
(Singapore) Yeo J M	10	13

Quarter-finals
1	(Chinese Taipei) Tai T-y	21	24	21
5	(India) P. V. Sindhu	16	26	17

==== Section 2 ====
First Round
3	(Japan) N Okuhara	21	21
(China) Han Y	15	11
(Spain) C Marín	21	22	21
(China) Cai YY	8	24	15
6	(Thailand) R Intanon	19	21	21
(Scotland) K Gilmour	21	17	9
(Russia) E Kosetskaya	21	16	21
(Denmark) M Blichfeldt	11	21	15

Second Round
3	(Japan) N Okuhara	18	17
(Spain) C Marín	21	21
6	(Thailand) R Intanon	21	21
(Russia) E Kosetskaya	16	12

Quarter-finals
(Spain) C Marín	21	17	21
6	(Thailand) R Intanon	18	21	14

=== Bottom half ===
==== Section 3 ====
First Round
(Japan) A Ohori	21	14	19
(Denmark) L Kjærsfeldt	19	21	21
(Hong Kong) Cheung N Y	21	17
8	(India) S Nehwal	23	21
(South Korea) An S-y	21	21
(Thailand) B Ongbamrungphan	10	12
(China) Chen XX	21	21
PFR	(Switzerland) S Jaquet	15	11

Second Round
(Denmark) L Kjærsfeldt	10	11
8	(India) S Nehwal	21	21
(South Korea) An S-y	15	16
(China) Chen XX	21	7^{r}

Quarter-finals
8	(India) S Nehwal	20	21
(South Korea) An S-y	22	23

==== Section 4 ====
First Round
(Indonesia) Fitriani	21	21
PFR	(Turkey) N Yigit	17	12
(Indonesia) G M Tunjung	12	18
7	(China) He BJ	21	21
(Thailand) P Chochuwong	22	21
(Thailand) N Jindapol	20	17
(Japan) S Takahashi	12	17
2	(Japan) A Yamaguchi	21	21

Second Round
(Indonesia) Fitriani	21	10	20
7	(China) He BJ	18	21	22
(Thailand) P Chochuwong	9	18
2	(Japan) A Yamaguchi	21	21

Quarter-finals
7	(China) He BJ	13	0^{r}
2	(Japan) A Yamaguchi	21	0

== Men's doubles ==
=== Seeds ===
1. (Indonesia) Marcus Fernaldi Gideon / Kevin Sanjaya Sukamuljo (champions)
2. (Indonesia) Mohammad Ahsan / Hendra Setiawan (second round)
3. (China) Li Junhui / Liu Yuchen (quarter-finals)
4. (Japan) Takeshi Kamura / Keigo Sonoda (quarter-finals)
5. (Japan) Hiroyuki Endo / Yuta Watanabe (semi-finals)
6. (Indonesia) Fajar Alfian / Muhammad Rian Ardianto (first round)
7. (China) Han Chengkai / Zhou Haodong (quarter-finals)
8. (Japan) Takuro Hoki / Yugo Kobayashi (first round)

=== Finals ===
Semi-finals
1	(Indonesia) Marcus Fernaldi Gideon (Indonesia) Kevin Sanjaya Sukamuljo	21	23
(Chinese Taipei) Liao Min-chun (Chinese Taipei) Su Ching-heng	18	21
5	(Japan) Hiroyuki Endo (Japan) Yuta Watanabe	11	23
(India) Satwiksairaj Rankireddy (India) Chirag Shetty	21	25

Final
1	(Indonesia) Marcus Fernaldi Gideon (Indonesia) Kevin Sanjaya Sukamuljo	21	21
(India) Satwiksairaj Rankireddy (India) Chirag Shetty	18	16

=== Top half ===
==== Section 1 ====
First Round
1	(Indonesia) M F Gideon (Indonesia) K S Sukamuljo	19	21	21
(China) Di ZJ (China) Wang C	21	11	17
(South Korea) Kim G-j (South Korea) Lee Y-d	21	21
(Chinese Taipei) Lu C-y (Chinese Taipei) Yang P-ha	9	17
7	(China) Han CK (China) Zhou HD	21	18	21
(Germany) M Lamsfuß (Germany) M E Seidel	17	21	16
(Thailand) B Isara (Thailand) M Jongjit	13	14
(Indonesia) W Nayaka (Indonesia) A Yusuf	21	21

Second Round
1	(Indonesia) M F Gideon (Indonesia) K S Sukamuljo	21	0
(South Korea) Kim G-j (South Korea) Lee Y-d	18	0^{r}
7	(China) Han CK (China) Zhou HD	21	20	22
(Indonesia) W Nayaka (Indonesia) A Yusuf	18	22	20

Quarter-finals
1	(Indonesia) M F Gideon (Indonesia) K S Sukamuljo	23	21
7	(China) Han CK (China) Zhou HD	21	14

==== Section 2 ====
First Round
4	(Japan) T Kamura (Japan) K Sonoda	11	21	21
(Malaysia) Goh V S (Malaysia) Tan W K	21	14	16
(Chinese Taipei) Lee Y (Chinese Taipei) Wang C-l	21	18	21
(Chinese Taipei) Lee J-h (Chinese Taipei) Yang P-hs	10	21	13
6	(Indonesia) F Alfian (Indonesia) M R Ardianto	12	16
(Denmark) M Boe (Denmark) M Conrad-Petersen	21	21
(Chinese Taipei) Liao M-c (Chinese Taipei) Su C-h	21	21
(United States) P Chew (United States) R Chew	11	14

Second Round
4	(Japan) T Kamura (Japan) K Sonoda	21	16	21
(Chinese Taipei) Lee Y (Chinese Taipei) Wang C-l	12	21	14
(Denmark) M Boe (Denmark) M Conrad-Petersen	21	17	15
(Chinese Taipei) Liao M-c (Chinese Taipei) Su C-h	14	21	21

Quarter-finals
4	(Japan) T Kamura (Japan) K Sonoda	14	15
(Chinese Taipei) Liao M-c (Chinese Taipei) Su C-h	21	21

=== Bottom half ===
==== Section 3 ====
First Round
(Russia) V Ivanov (Russia) I Sozonov	21	20	21
(Japan) T Inoue (Japan) Y Kaneko	16	22	23
(England) M Ellis (England) C Langridge	17	13
5	(Japan) H Endo (Japan) Y Watanabe	21	21
(England) B Lane (England) S Vendy	21	20	21
(India) M Attri (India) B. S Reddy	19	22	15
PFR	(Denmark) M Bay-Smidt (Denmark) L Mølhede	13	11
3	(China) Li JH (China) Liu YC	21	21

Second Round
(Japan) T Inoue (Japan) Y Kaneko	14	13
5	(Japan) H Endo (Japan) Y Watanabe	21	21
(England) B Lane (England) S Vendy	20	15
3	(China) Li JH (China) Liu YC	22	21

Quarter-finals
5	(Japan) H Endo (Japan) Y Watanabe	21	18	21
3	(China) Li JH (China) Liu YC	12	21	9

==== Section 4 ====
First Round
(Malaysia) A Chia (Malaysia) Soh W Y	21	21
(South Korea) Choi S-g (South Korea) Seo S-j	17	15
(Denmark) K Astrup (Denmark) A S Rasmussen	22	21
8	(Japan) T Hoki (Japan) Y Kobayashi	20	14
(Netherlands) J Maas (Netherlands) R Tabeling	16	14
(India) S Rankireddy (India) C Shetty	21	21
(Malaysia) Ong Y S (Malaysia) Teo E Y	21	19	19
2	(Indonesia) M Ahsan (Indonesia) H Setiawan	12	21	21

Second Round
(Malaysia) A Chia (Malaysia) Soh W Y	19	21	21
(Denmark) K Astrup (Denmark) A S Rasmussen	21	13	23
(India) S Rankireddy (India) C Shetty	21	18	21
2	(Indonesia) M Ahsan (Indonesia) H Setiawan	18	21	13

Quarter-finals
(Denmark) K Astrup (Denmark) A S Rasmussen	13	20
(India) S Rankireddy (India) C Shetty	21	22

== Women's doubles ==
=== Seeds ===
1. (Japan) Mayu Matsumoto / Wakana Nagahara (semi-finals)
2. (Japan) Yuki Fukushima / Sayaka Hirota (semi-finals)
3. (Japan) Misaki Matsutomo / Ayaka Takahashi (second round)
4. (China) Chen Qingchen / Jia Yifan (quarter-finals)
5. (South Korea) Lee So-hee / Shin Seung-chan (champions)
6. (Indonesia) Greysia Polii / Apriyani Rahayu (second round)
7. (China) Du Yue / Li Yinhui (withdrew)
8. (South Korea) Kim So-yeong / Kong Hee-yong (final)

=== Finals ===
Semi-finals
1	(Japan) Mayu Matsumoto (Japan) Wakana Nagahara	15	21	14
8	(South Korea) Kim So-yeong (South Korea) Kong Hee-yong	21	16	21
5	(South Korea) Lee So-hee (South Korea) Shin Seung-chan	21	21
2	(Japan) Yuki Fukushima (Japan) Sayaka Hirota	17	16

Final
8	(South Korea) Kim So-yeong (South Korea) Kong Hee-yong	21	19	12
5	(South Korea) Lee So-hee (South Korea) Shin Seung-chan	16	21	21

=== Top half ===
==== Section 1 ====
First Round
1	(Japan) M Matsumoto (Japan) W Nagahara	21	21
(England) C Birch (England) L Smith	19	16
(France) É Lefel (France) A Tran	21	21
(Russia) E Bolotova (Russia) A Davletova	12	19
6	(Indonesia) G Polii (Indonesia) A Rahayu	13	21	21
(Japan) A Sakuramoto (Japan) Y Takahata	21	16	16
(China) Liu XX (China) Xia YT	21	21
(Canada) R Honderich (Canada) K Tsai	17	7

Second Round
1	(Japan) M Matsumoto (Japan) W Nagahara	21	21
(France) É Lefel (France) A Tran	17	9
6	(Indonesia) G Polii (Indonesia) A Rahayu	19	12
(China) Liu XX (China) Xia YT	21	21

Quarter-finals
1	(Japan) M Matsumoto (Japan) W Nagahara	22	21
(China) Liu XX (China) Xia YT	20	17

==== Section 2 ====
First Round
4	(China) Chen QC (China) Jia YF	21	21
(Russia) A Akchurina (Russia) O Morozova	13	12
(Malaysia) V Hoo K M (Malaysia) Yap C W	21	21
(United States) A Lee (United States) S Lee	9	10
8	(South Korea) Kim S-y (South Korea) Kong H-y	21	21
(Denmark) A Bøje (Denmark) M Poulsen	19	14
(Netherlands) S Piek (Netherlands) C Seinen	22	14	21
(Chinese Taipei) Cheng C-y (Chinese Taipei) Lee C-c	20	21	17

Second Round
4	(China) Chen QC (China) Jia YF	21	21
(Malaysia) V Hoo K M (Malaysia) Yap C W	11	12
8	(South Korea) Kim S-y (South Korea) Kong H-y	21	21
(Netherlands) S Piek (Netherlands) C Seinen	10	17

Quarter-finals
4	(China) Chen QC (China) Jia YF	16	12
8	(South Korea) Kim S-y (South Korea) Kong H-y	21	21

=== Bottom half ===
==== Section 3 ====
First Round
(Thailand) J Kititharakul (Thailand) R Prajongjai	21	21
(Denmark) M Fruergaard (Denmark) S Thygesen	16	17
(India) A Ponnappa (India) N. S Reddy	21	13	17
5	(South Korea) Lee S-h (South Korea) Shin S-c	16	21	21
(Thailand) P Supajirakul (Thailand) S Taerattanachai	21	10	17
(Bulgaria) G Stoeva (Bulgaria) S Stoeva	17	21	21
(South Korea) Baek H-n (South Korea) Jung K-e	15	14
3	(Japan) M Matsutomo (Japan) A Takahashi	21	21

Second Round
(Thailand) J Kititharakul (Thailand) R Prajongjai	7	14
5	(South Korea) Lee S-h (South Korea) Shin S-c	21	21
(Bulgaria) G Stoeva (Bulgaria) S Stoeva	21	15	21
3	(Japan) M Matsutomo (Japan) A Takahashi	18	21	18

Quarter-finals
5	(South Korea) Lee S-h (South Korea) Shin S-c	21	21
(Bulgaria) G Stoeva (Bulgaria) S Stoeva	11	6

==== Section 4 ====
First Round
(Chinese Taipei) Hsu Y-c (Chinese Taipei) Hu L-f	21	22	21
(France) D Delrue (France) L Palermo	11	24	12
(Malaysia) Chow M K (Malaysia) Lee M Y	21	21
PFR	(Switzerland) N Fankhauser (Netherlands) I Tabeling	10	15
(Germany) L Efler (Germany) I Herttrich	20	21
(China) Dong WJ (China) Feng XY	22	23
(South Korea) Chang Y-n (South Korea) Kim H-r	20	10
2	(Japan) Y Fukushima (Japan) S Hirota	22	21

Second Round
(Chinese Taipei) Hsu Y-c (Chinese Taipei) Hu L-f	21	21	23
(Malaysia) Chow M K (Malaysia) Lee M Y	16	23	21
(China) Dong WJ (China) Feng XY	12	14
2	(Japan) Y Fukushima (Japan) S Hirota	21	21

Quarter-finals
(Chinese Taipei) Hsu Y-c (Chinese Taipei) Hu L-f	11	7
2	(Japan) Y Fukushima (Japan) S Hirota	21	21

== Mixed doubles ==
=== Seeds ===
1. (China) Zheng Siwei / Huang Yaqiong (final)
2. (Thailand) Dechapol Puavaranukroh / Sapsiree Taerattanachai (quarter-finals)
3. (Japan) Yuta Watanabe / Arisa Higashino (semi-finals)
4. (South Korea) Seo Seung-jae / Chae Yoo-jung (second round)
5. (Malaysia) Chan Peng Soon / Goh Liu Ying (first round)
6. (Indonesia) Praveen Jordan / Melati Daeva Oktavianti (champions)
7. (England) Marcus Ellis / Lauren Smith (first round)
8. (Indonesia) Hafiz Faizal / Gloria Emanuelle Widjaja (second round)

=== Finals ===
Semi-finals
1	(China) Zheng Siwei (China) Huang Yaqiong	21	12	21
3	(Japan) Yuta Watanabe (Japan) Arisa Higashino	12	21	16
(England) Chris Adcock (England) Gabby Adcock	19	12
6	(Indonesia) Praveen Jordan (Indonesia) Melati Daeva Oktavianti	21	21

Final
1	(China) Zheng Siwei (China) Huang Yaqiong	24	16	12
6	(Indonesia) Praveen Jordan (Indonesia) Melati Daeva Oktavianti	22	21	21

=== Top half ===
==== Section 1 ====
First Round
1	(China) Zheng SW (China) Huang YQ	19	21	21
(Malaysia) Goh S H (Malaysia) S J Lai	21	19	15
(Hong Kong) Chang T C (Hong Kong) Ng W Y	21	21
(Republic of Ireland) S Magee (Republic of Ireland) C Magee	19	15
5	(Malaysia) Chan P S (Malaysia) Goh L Y	21	16	13
(Malaysia) Tan K M (Malaysia) Lai P J	19	21	21
(Japan) K Gondo (Japan) A Kurihara	15	14
(Indonesia) R Rivaldy (Indonesia) P H Mentari	21	21

Second Round
1	(China) Zheng SW (China) Huang YQ	21	21
(Hong Kong) Chang T C (Hong Kong) Ng W Y	18	12
(Malaysia) Tan K M (Malaysia) Lai P J	9	21	22
(Indonesia) R Rivaldy (Indonesia) P H Mentari	21	18	20

Quarter-finals
1	(China) Zheng SW (China) Huang YQ	21	20	21
(Malaysia) Tan K M (Malaysia) Lai P J	14	22	12

==== Section 2 ====
First Round
3	(Japan) Y Watanabe (Japan) A Higashino	21	19	21
(Russia) R Alimov (Russia) A Davletova	10	21	15
(Netherlands) R Tabeling (Netherlands) S Piek	21	15	21
PFR	(Chinese Taipei) Wang C-l (Chinese Taipei) Cheng C-y	19	21	16
8	(Indonesia) H Faizal (Indonesia) G E Widjaja	21	21
(Japan) Y Kaneko (Japan) M Matsutomo	15	17
(England) B Lane (England) J Pugh	21	21
(Thailand) N Phuangphuapet (Thailand) S Amitrapai	19	16

Second Round
3	(Japan) Y Watanabe (Japan) A Higashino	21	19	21
(Netherlands) R Tabeling (Netherlands) S Piek	14	21	8
8	(Indonesia) H Faizal (Indonesia) G E Widjaja	12	21	15
(England) B Lane (England) J Pugh	21	17	21

Quarter-finals
3	(Japan) Y Watanabe (Japan) A Higashino	21	20	21
(England) B Lane (England) J Pugh	17	22	19

=== Bottom half ===
==== Section 3 ====
First Round
(Japan) T Hoki (Japan) W Nagahara	23	21	21
(Germany) M E Seidel (Germany) L Efler	25	19	19
(Germany) M Lamsfuß (Germany) I Herttrich	21	21
7	(England) M Ellis (England) L Smith	17	15
(England) C Adcock (England) G Adcock	21	21
(India) P Chopra (India) N. S Reddy	13	18
(India) S Rankireddy (India) A Ponnappa	17	18
4	(South Korea) Seo S-j (South Korea) Chae Y-j	21	21

Second Round
(Japan) T Hoki (Japan) W Nagahara	21	21
(Germany) M Lamsfuß (Germany) I Herttrich	18	16
(England) C Adcock (England) G Adcock	23	18	21
4	(South Korea) Seo S-j (South Korea) Chae Y-j	21	21	14

Quarter-finals
(Japan) T Hoki (Japan) W Nagahara	18	21	15
(England) C Adcock (England) G Adcock	21	17	21

==== Section 4 ====
First Round
PFR	(Denmark) M Christiansen (Denmark) A Bøje	21	21
(Indonesia) T Ahmad (Indonesia) W O Kandow	14	18
(Hong Kong) Tang C M (Hong Kong) Tse Y S	17	15
6	(Indonesia) P Jordan (Indonesia) M D Oktavianti	21	21
(Chinese Taipei) Lee J-h (Chinese Taipei) Hsu Y-c	19	13
(China) Lu K (China) Chen L	21	21
(France) T Gicquel (France) D Delrue	15	16
2	(Thailand) D Puavaranukroh (Thailand) S Taerattanachai	21	21

Second Round
PFR	(Denmark) M Christiansen (Denmark) A Bøje	21	15	13
6	(Indonesia) P Jordan (Indonesia) M D Oktavianti	19	21	21
(China) Lu K (China) Chen L	10	21	15
2	(Thailand) D Puavaranukroh (Thailand) S Taerattanachai	21	17	21

Quarter-finals
6	(Indonesia) P Jordan (Indonesia) M D Oktavianti	21	21
2	(Thailand) D Puavaranukroh (Thailand) S Taerattanachai	14	7

Preceded by 2019 Denmark Open	BWF World Tour; 2019 BWF season	Succeeded by 2019 Macau Open
