= Melati Daeva Oktavianti =

Indonesian badminton player (born 1994)

Personal information
- Born: Melati Daeva Oktavianti; October 26, 1994 (age 32) Serang, Banten, Indonesia
- Height: 168 cm (5 ft 6 in)
- Weight: 63 kg (139 lb)

Sport
- Country: Indonesia
- Sport: Badminton
- Handedness: Right

Mixed doubles
- Highest ranking: 4 (with Praveen Jordan, 17 March 2020)
- Current ranking: 40 (with Bobby Setiabudi, 7 July 2026)
- BWF profile
Medal record
Women's badminton
Representing Indonesia
Sudirman Cup
Bronze medal – third place	2019 Nanning	Mixed team
Asian Championships
Bronze medal – third place	2022 Manila	Mixed doubles
SEA Games
Gold medal – first place	2019 Philippines	Mixed doubles
Silver medal – second place	2019 Philippines	Women's team
World Junior Championships
Gold medal – first place	2012 Chiba	Mixed doubles
Asian Junior Championships
Bronze medal – third place	2011 Lucknow	Mixed team

Melati Daeva Oktavianti (born 26 October 1994) is an Indonesian doubles specialist badminton player affiliated with Djarum club since 2008. She was the 2019 SEA Games gold medalist in the mixed doubles with Praveen Jordan, and 2012 World Junior mixed doubles champion partnered with Edi Subaktiar. Oktavianti and Subaktiar partnership were also a former world junior number 1.

Oktavianti and her partner, Jordan, won the historical All England Open in 2020. The duo reached a career high of world number 4 in March 2020. Oktavianti competed at the 2020 Summer Olympics.

== Career ==
=== Junior career ===
Oktavianti won four titles at the junior tournament, two girls doubles titles at the German Junior and Indonesia Junior International with Rosyita Eka Putri Sari, and two mixed doubles titles at the Dutch Junior and Indonesia Junior International with Edi Subaktiar.

=== Senior career ===
In 2012, Oktavianti and Edi Subaktiar won their first senior title at the Banuinvest International.

In 2013, Oktavianti and Rosyita Eka Putri Sari lost at the finals of Maldives International.

In March 2014, Oktavianti and her new partner in women's doubles Melvira Oklamona lost at the finals of Vietnam International. In April, Oktavianti and Subaktiar reached their first Grand Prix event at the New Zealand Open Grand Prix, but lost to fellow Indonesian pair Alfian Eko Prasetya and Annisa Saufika. In August, Oktavianti and her new mixed doubles partner Ronald Alexander won the Indonesia International.

In February 2015, Oktavianti and Ronald lost at the finals of Austrian Open. In October, they won the Chinese Taipei Masters Grand Prix defeating Taiwanese pair Chang Ko-chi and Chang Hsin-tien.

In September 2016, Oktavianti and Ronald won the Indonesian Masters Grand Prix Gold beating Malaysian pair Tan Kian Meng and Lai Pei Jing.

In September 2017, Oktavianti made new mixed doubles partnership with Alfian Eko Prasetya and won Vietnam Open Grand Prix defeating fellow Indonesian pair Riky Widianto and Masita Mahmudin.

==== 2018–2019 ====
After the retirement of Debby Susanto, Praveen Jordan was paired with Oktavianti. They lost to Chinese pair Zheng Siwei and Huang Yaqiong in the second round of the Malaysia Masters. They then became runners-up at the 2018 India Open. They finished the season ranked as world number 15.

In 2019, Oktavianti and Jordan lost again twice in a row at the India Open from Chinese pair Wang Yilyu and Huang Dongping. In May, they lost at the New Zealand Open from Malaysian pair Chan Peng Soon and Goh Liu Ying. In June, they reached third finals of the year at the Australian Open but lost to Wang and Huang again. In July, they reached the fourth finals at the Japan Open but had to lose from Wang and Huang again.

In October 2019, they won their first BWF World Tour title at the Denmark Open. The duo upset the current World Champions Zheng Siwei and Huang Yaqiong in the quarter-finals, and defeated world number 2 Wang and Huang in the finals. This victory was their first win over them, bringing their head-to-head record to 1–6. A week later, the duo again overcame the world number 1 Zheng and Huang to claimed the French Open title. Jordan and Oktavianti have continued on the upward track this season, breaking into the top 5 of the BWF world ranking.

==== 2020–2022 ====
In 2020, Oktavianti and Jordan won All England Open title. They defeated Thai pair Dechapol Puavaranukroh and Sapsiree Taerattanachai in the final.

In January 2021, Oktavianti and Jordan lost at the Yonex Thailand Open from Thai pair Puavaranukroh and Taerattanachai in the final. In July, they competed at the 2020 Summer Olympics, but they were eliminated in the quarter-finals. In November, they lost at the Hylo Open in Germany from Thai pair Puavaranukroh and Taerattanachai in the final.

In 2022, Oktavianti and Jordan played at the Asian Championships in Manila. They reached the semi-finals and won a bronze medal, after the pair had to retire in the middle of the match due to a hip injury suffered by Jordan. Following the injury of Jordan, Djarum decided to give Oktavianti with new partner Muhammad Reza Pahlevi Isfahani and reached the finals of Yogyakarta Indonesia International Series but had to lose to fellow Indonesian and Djarum club pair Dejan Ferdinansyah and Gloria Emanuelle Widjaja.

==== 2023 ====
In January, Oktavianti and her partner Jordan comeback to court at the Indonesia Masters, but had to lose in the first round from Chinese pair Feng Yanzhe and Huang Dongping.

In March, Oktavianti and Jordan competed in the European tour, but unfortunately lost in the second round of German Open from 5th seed Chinese pair Feng Yanzhe and Huang Dongping in two consecutive meeting. In the next tour, they competed in the All England Open but lost in the second round from 3rd seed Thai pair Dechapol Puavaranukroh and Sapsiree Taerattanachai. In the next tour, they competed in the Swiss Open but lost in the first round from 6th seed Malaysian pair Goh Soon Huat and Shevon Jemie Lai. In the next tour, they competed in the Spain Masters, but had to lose in the finals from 8th Danish pair Mathias Christiansen and Alexandra Bøje.

In late April, Oktavianti and Jordan competed at the Asian Championships in Dubai, United Arab Emirates, but had to lose in the quarter-finals from 1st seed and eventual finalist Chinese pair Zheng Siwei and Huang Yaqiong.

In late May, Oktavianti and Jordan competed in the second Asian Tour at the Malaysia Masters. Unfortunately, they lost in the second round from Chinese pair Jiang Zhenbang and Wei Yaxin in rubber games.

In June, Oktavianti and Jordan competed at the Singapore Open, but lost in the first round from fellow Indonesian pair Rinov Rivaldy and Pitha Haningtyas Mentari. In the next tour, they competed at the home tournament, Indonesia Open, but lost in the second round from Hong Konger pair Tang Chun Man and Tse Ying Suet in straight matches.

In July, Oktavianti and Jordan competed at the Korea Open, but had to lose in the second round from 1st seed Chinese pair Zheng Siwei and Huang Yaqiong for second times this year. In the next tour, they competed at Japan Open, but lost in the first round from 3rd seed Japanese pair Yuta Watanabe and Arisa Higashino in straight games.

In early August, Oktavianti and Jordan competed at the Australian Open, but had to lose in the second round from Hong Kong pair Tang Chun Man and Tse Ying Suet in straight games.

== Awards and nominations ==
Award	Year	Category	Result	Ref.
BWF Awards	2019	Most Improved Player of the Year with Praveen Jordan	Nominated	

== Achievements ==
=== Asian Championships ===
Mixed doubles
Year	Venue	Partner	Opponent	Score	Result	Ref.
2022	Muntinlupa Sports Complex; Metro Manila, Philippines	(Indonesia) Praveen Jordan	(China) Zheng Siwei (China) Huang Yaqiong	8–21 retired	Bronze	

=== SEA Games ===
Mixed doubles
Year	Venue	Partner	Opponent	Score	Result	Ref.
2019	Muntinlupa Sports Complex; Metro Manila, Philippines	(Indonesia) Praveen Jordan	(Malaysia) Goh Soon Huat (Malaysia) Shevon Jemie Lai	21–19, 19–21, 23–21	Gold	

=== BWF World Junior Championships ===
Mixed doubles
Year	Venue	Partner	Opponent	Score	Result	Ref.
2012	Chiba Port Arena; Chiba, Japan	(Indonesia) Edi Subaktiar	(Indonesia) Alfian Eko Prasetya (Indonesia) Shella Devi Aulia	21–17, 21–13	Gold	

=== BWF World Tour (3 titles, 9 runners-up) ===
The BWF World Tour, which was announced on 19 March 2017 and implemented in 2018, is a series of elite badminton tournaments sanctioned by the Badminton World Federation (BWF). The BWF World Tour is divided into levels of World Tour Finals, Super 1000, Super 750, Super 500, Super 300, and the BWF Tour Super 100.

Mixed doubles
Year	Tournament	Level	Partner	Opponent	Score	Result	Ref.
2018	India Open	Super 500	(Indonesia) Praveen Jordan	(Denmark) Mathias Christiansen (Denmark) Christinna Pedersen	14–21, 15–21	(silver) Runner-up	
2019	India Open	Super 500	(Indonesia) Praveen Jordan	(China) Wang Yilyu (China) Huang Dongping	13–21, 11–21	(silver) Runner-up	
2019	New Zealand Open	Super 300	(Indonesia) Praveen Jordan	(Malaysia) Chan Peng Soon (Malaysia) Goh Liu Ying	14–21, 21–16, 27–29	(silver) Runner-up	
2019	Australian Open	Super 300	(Indonesia) Praveen Jordan	(China) Wang Yilyu (China) Huang Dongping	15–21, 8–21	(silver) Runner-up	
2019	Japan Open	Super 750	(Indonesia) Praveen Jordan	(China) Wang Yilyu (China) Huang Dongping	17–21, 16–21	(silver) Runner-up	
2019	Denmark Open	Super 750	(Indonesia) Praveen Jordan	(China) Wang Yilyu (China) Huang Dongping	21–18, 18–21, 21–19	(gold) Winner	
2019	French Open	Super 750	(Indonesia) Praveen Jordan	(China) Zheng Siwei (China) Huang Yaqiong	22–24, 21–16, 21–12	(gold) Winner	
2020	All England Open	Super 1000	(Indonesia) Praveen Jordan	(Thailand) Dechapol Puavaranukroh (Thailand) Sapsiree Taerattanachai	21–15, 17–21, 21–8	(gold) Winner	
2020 (I)	Thailand Open	Super 1000	(Indonesia) Praveen Jordan	(Thailand) Dechapol Puavaranukroh (Thailand) Sapsiree Taerattanachai	3–21, 22–20, 18–21	(silver) Runner-up	
2021	Hylo Open	Super 500	(Indonesia) Praveen Jordan	(Thailand) Dechapol Puavaranukroh (Thailand) Sapsiree Taerattanachai	20–22, 14–21	(silver) Runner-up	
2023	Spain Masters	Super 300	(Indonesia) Praveen Jordan	(Denmark) Mathias Christiansen (Denmark) Alexandra Bøje	20–22, 18–21	(silver) Runner-up	
2026	Thailand Masters	Super 300	(Indonesia) Bobby Setiabudi	(Indonesia) Adnan Maulana (Indonesia) Indah Cahya Sari Jamil	21–18, 19–21, 17–21	(silver) Runner-up	

=== BWF Grand Prix (3 titles, 1 runner-up) ===
The BWF Grand Prix had two levels, the Grand Prix and Grand Prix Gold. It was a series of badminton tournaments sanctioned by the Badminton World Federation (BWF) and played between 2007 and 2017.

Mixed doubles
Year	Tournament	Partner	Opponent	Score	Result	Ref.
2014	New Zealand Open	(Indonesia) Edi Subaktiar	(Indonesia) Alfian Eko Prasetya (Indonesia) Annisa Saufika	18–21, 21–17, 12–21	(silver) Runner-up	
2015	Chinese Taipei Masters	(Indonesia) Ronald Alexander	(Chinese Taipei) Chang Ko-chi (Chinese Taipei) Chang Hsin-tien	21–18, 25–27, 21–15	(gold) Winner	
2016	Indonesian Masters	(Indonesia) Ronald Alexander	(Malaysia) Tan Kian Meng (Malaysia) Lai Pei Jing	21–16, 21–17	(gold) Winner	
2017	Vietnam Open	(Indonesia) Alfian Eko Prasetya	(Indonesia) Riky Widianto (Indonesia) Masita Mahmudin	21–14, 21–14	(gold) Winner	

BWF Grand Prix Gold tournament
BWF Grand Prix tournament

=== BWF International Challenge/Series (7 titles, 4 runners-up) ===
Women's doubles
Year	Tournament	Partner	Opponent	Score	Result	Ref.
2013	Maldives International	(Indonesia) Rosyita Eka Putri Sari	(Indonesia) Maretha Dea Giovani (Indonesia) Melvira Oklamona	15–21, 15–21	(silver) Runner-up	
2014	Vietnam International	(Indonesia) Melvira Oklamona	(Japan) Yano Chiemi (Japan) Yumiko Nishiyama	12–21, 20–22	(silver) Runner-up	

Mixed doubles
Year	Tournament	Partner	Opponent	Score	Result	Ref.
2012	Banuinvest International	(Indonesia) Edi Subaktiar	(Austria) Roman Zirnwald (Austria) Elisabeth Baldauf	21–19, 21–18	(gold) Winner	
2014	Indonesia International	(Indonesia) Ronald Alexander	(Indonesia) Muhammad Rijal (Indonesia) Vita Marissa	7–11, 11–4, 11–6, 11–7	(gold) Winner	
2015	Austrian Open	(Indonesia) Ronald Alexander	(Indonesia) Edi Subaktiar (Indonesia) Gloria Emanuelle Widjaja	21–15, 20–22, 18–21	(silver) Runner-up	
2022	Indonesia International	(Indonesia) Muhammad Reza Pahlevi Isfahani	(Indonesia) Dejan Ferdinansyah (Indonesia) Gloria Emanuelle Widjaja	21–19, 9–21, 21–23	(silver) Runner-up	
2025	Singapore International	(Indonesia) Bobby Setiabudi	(Thailand) Phuwanat Horbanluekit (Thailand) Fungfa Korpthammakit	21–19, 21–16	(gold) Winner	
2025	Sri Lanka International	(Indonesia) Bobby Setiabudi	(Japan) Yuta Watanabe (Japan) Maya Taguchi	16–21, 21–14, 21–18	(gold) Winner	
2025 (I)	Indonesia International	(Indonesia) Bobby Setiabudi	(Indonesia) Renaldi Samosir (Indonesia) Masita Mahmudin	17–21, 21–11, 21–16	(gold) Winner	
2025 (II)	Indonesia International	(Indonesia) Bobby Setiabudi	(Indonesia) Renaldi Samosir (Indonesia) Masita Mahmudin	21–8, 12–21, 21–12	(gold) Winner	
2026 (II)	Indonesia International	(Indonesia) Rehan Naufal Kusharjanto	(Indonesia) Bagas Maulana (Indonesia) Apriyani Rahayu	21–19, 21–15	(gold) Winner	

BWF International Challenge tournament
BWF International Series tournament

=== BWF Junior International (4 titles) ===
Girls' doubles
Year	Tournament	Partner	Opponent	Score	Result	Ref.
2012	German Junior	(Indonesia) Rosyita Eka Putri Sari	(South Korea) Jeon Ju-i (South Korea) Yang Soo-yeon	21–9, 21–13	(gold) Winner	
2012	Indonesia Junior International	(Indonesia) Rosyita Eka Putri Sari	(Japan) Miyuki Kato (Japan) Ami Ueno	21–16, 21–10	(gold) Winner	

Mixed doubles
Year	Tournament	Partner	Opponent	Score	Result	Ref.
2012	Dutch Junior	(Indonesia) Edi Subaktiar	(Hong Kong) Tam Chun Hei (Hong Kong) Yuen Sin Ying	24–22, 23–21	(gold) Winner	
2012	Indonesia Junior International	(Indonesia) Edi Subaktiar	(Indonesia) Tedi Supriadi (Indonesia) Della Augustia Surya	18–21, 21–12, 21–11	(gold) Winner	

BWF Junior International Grand Prix tournament
BWF Junior International Challenge tournament
BWF Junior International Series tournament
BWF Junior Future Series tournament

== Performance timeline ==
Key

W	Won	F	Finalist	SF	Semi-finalist
QF	Quarter-finalist	#R	Rounds 4, 3, 2, 1	RR	Round-robin stage
Q#	Qualification round	A	Absent	w/d	Withdrew
G	Gold	S	Silver	B	Bronze
NH	Not held	N/A	Not applicable	DNQ	Did not qualify

=== National team ===
- Junior level

Team events	2011	2012
Asian Junior Championships	B	QF
World Junior Championships	A	4th

- Senior level

Team events	2019	2020	2021
SEA Games	S	NH	A
Sudirman Cup	B	NH	QF

=== Individual competitions ===
==== Junior level ====
Girls' doubles

Events	2011	2012
Asian Junior Championships	1R	QF
World Junior Championships	A	QF

Mixed doubles

Events	2011	2012	Ref
Asian Junior Championships	2R	QF	
World Junior Championships	A	G	

==== Senior level ====
===== Women's doubles =====
Tournament	BWF Superseries / Grand Prix						Best
Tournament	2010	2011	2012	2013	2014	2015	Best
Malaysia Masters	A			QF	A		QF ('13)
New Zealand Open	NH	N/A	NH	A	1R	A	1R ('14)
Chinese Taipei Open	A			1R	A		1R ('13)
Indonesia Masters	2R	2R	1R	QF	QF	A	QF ('13, '14)
Indonesia Open	A	2R	1R	Q2	1R	Q1	2R ('11)
Year-end ranking		107	135	58	156	889	54
Tournament	2010	2011	2012	2013	2014	Best	

===== Mixed doubles =====
Events	2016	2017	2018	2019	2020	2021	2022	2023	2024	2025	2026	Ref
SEA Games	NH	A	NH	G	NH	A	NH	A	NH	A	NH	
Asian Championships	2R	1R	1R	2R	NH		B	QF	A		1R	
World Championships	NH	DNQ	3R	3R	NH	w/d	w/d	DNQ	NH	DNQ	DNQ	
Olympic Games	DNQ	NH			QF	NH			DNQ	NH		

Tournament	BWF Superseries / Grand Prix									BWF World Tour								Best	Ref
Tournament	2010	2011	2012	2013	2014	2015	2016	2017	2018	2019	2020	2021	2022	2023	2024	2025	2026	Best	Ref
Malaysia Open	A						2R	A	1R	1R	NH		w/d	A				2R ('16)	
India Open	A								F	F	NH		A					F ('18, '19)	
Indonesia Masters	1R	A	2R	A	2R	2R	W	NH	SF	2R	QF	1R	2R	1R	A		1R	W ('16)	
Thailand Masters	NH						A	2R	A			NH		A			F	F ('26)	
German Open	A					QF	A		QF	1R	NH		w/d	2R	A			QF ('15, '18)	
All England Open	A						1R	1R	A	SF	W	w/d	QF	2R	A			W ('20)	
Ruichang China Masters	NH								A		NH			A	1R	A		1R ('24)	
Swiss Open	A						1R	1R	A		NH	A	1R	1R	A			1R ('16, '17, '22, '23)	
Orléans Masters	NA								A		NH	A		w/d	A			—	
Baoji China Masters	NH														A	QF	A	QF ('25)	
Thailand Open	NH	A			NH	1R	A		QF	2R	F	NH	A			1R	1R	F ('20)	
Thailand Open	NH	A			NH	1R	A		QF	2R	1R	NH	A			1R	1R	F ('20)	
Malaysia Masters	A					1R	QF	2R	2R	QF	1R	NH	w/d	2R	A		2R	QF ('16, '19)	
Singapore Open	A							1R	A	2R	NH		A	1R	A		1R	2R ('19)	
Indonesia Open	A		1R	A		1R	2R	1R	1R	1R	NH	2R	2R	2R	A		1R	2R ('16, '21, '22, '23)	
Australian Open	A						1R	A		F	NH		A	2R	A			F ('19)	
Macau Open	A				2R	SF	A	2R	A		NH				A	1R	A	SF ('15)	
Japan Open	A					2R	A		QF	F	NH		A	1R	A			F ('19)	
China Open	A						2R	A	1R	1R	NH			2R	A			2R ('16, '23)	
Taipei Open	A				QF	SF	2R	A			NH		A			QF	A	SF ('15)	
Korea Masters	A					2R	A	QF	SF	A	NH		A					SF ('18)	
China Masters	A					2R	A		QF	QF	NH			1R	A			QF ('18, '19)	
Indonesia Masters Super 100	NH								A		NH		QF	A		SF	SF	SF ('25 I, '25 II, '26 I)	
Indonesia Masters Super 100	NH								A		NH		QF	A	2R	SF	1R	SF ('25 I, '25 II, '26 I)	
Vietnam Open	A				SF	2R	A	W	A		NH		QF	A		2R	QF	W ('17)	
Arctic Open	N/A	NH	N/A								NH			1R	A			1R ('23)	
Denmark Open	A						1R	A	1R	W	A	SF	A	1R	A			W ('19)	
Malaysia Super 100	N/A													A	QF	A	SF	SF ('26)	
French Open	A						2R	A	2R	W	NH	QF	A	2R	A			W ('19)	
Hylo Open	A											F	A	1R	A			F ('21)	
Korea Open	A					1R	A		2R	QF	NH		A	2R	A			QF ('19)	
Kaohsiung Masters	NH													A			Q	('26)	
Hong Kong Open	A					2R	1R	2R	QF	2R	NH			1R	A			QF ('18)	
Syed Modi International	A			NH	A		QF	A			NH		A	2R	A		Q	QF ('16)	
Superseries / World Tour Finals	DNQ									RR	RR	RR	DNQ					RR ('19, '20, '21)	
Chinese Taipei Masters	NH					W	A	NH										W ('15)	
Dutch Open	A				QF	A					NH	N/A						QF ('14)	
New Zealand Open	NH	N/A	NH	A	F	2R	A			F	NH							F ('14, '19)	
Spain Masters	NH								A				NH	F	A	NH		F ('23)	
Year-end ranking		293	109		44	21	14	77	15	5	4	5	47	27	94	39		4	
Tournament	2010	2011	2012	2013	2014	2015	2016	2017	2018	2019	2020	2021	2022	2023	2024	2025	2026	Best	Ref

== Record against selected opponents ==
Mixed doubles results with Ronald Alexander against World Superseries finalists, World Superseries Finals semifinalists, World Championships semifinalists, and Olympic quarterfinalists:

- (China) Lu Kai & Huang Yaqiong 2–0
- (China) Xu Chen & Ma Jin 0–2
- (Denmark) Joachim Fischer Nielsen & Christinna Pedersen 0–1
- (Hong Kong) Reginald Lee Chun Hei & Chau Hoi Wah 1–1
- (Indonesia) Muhammad Rijal & Vita Marissa 1–1
- (Indonesia) Tontowi Ahmad & Liliyana Natsir 0–1
- (South Korea) Ko Sung-hyun & Kim Ha-na 0–2
