= Melati van Agam =

Melati van Agam may refer to:

- Melati van Agam (1931 film), a romance film directed by Lie Tek Swie
- Melati van Agam (1940 film), a romance film directed by Tan Tjoei Hock
