= Melati van Java =

Nicolina Maria Sloot
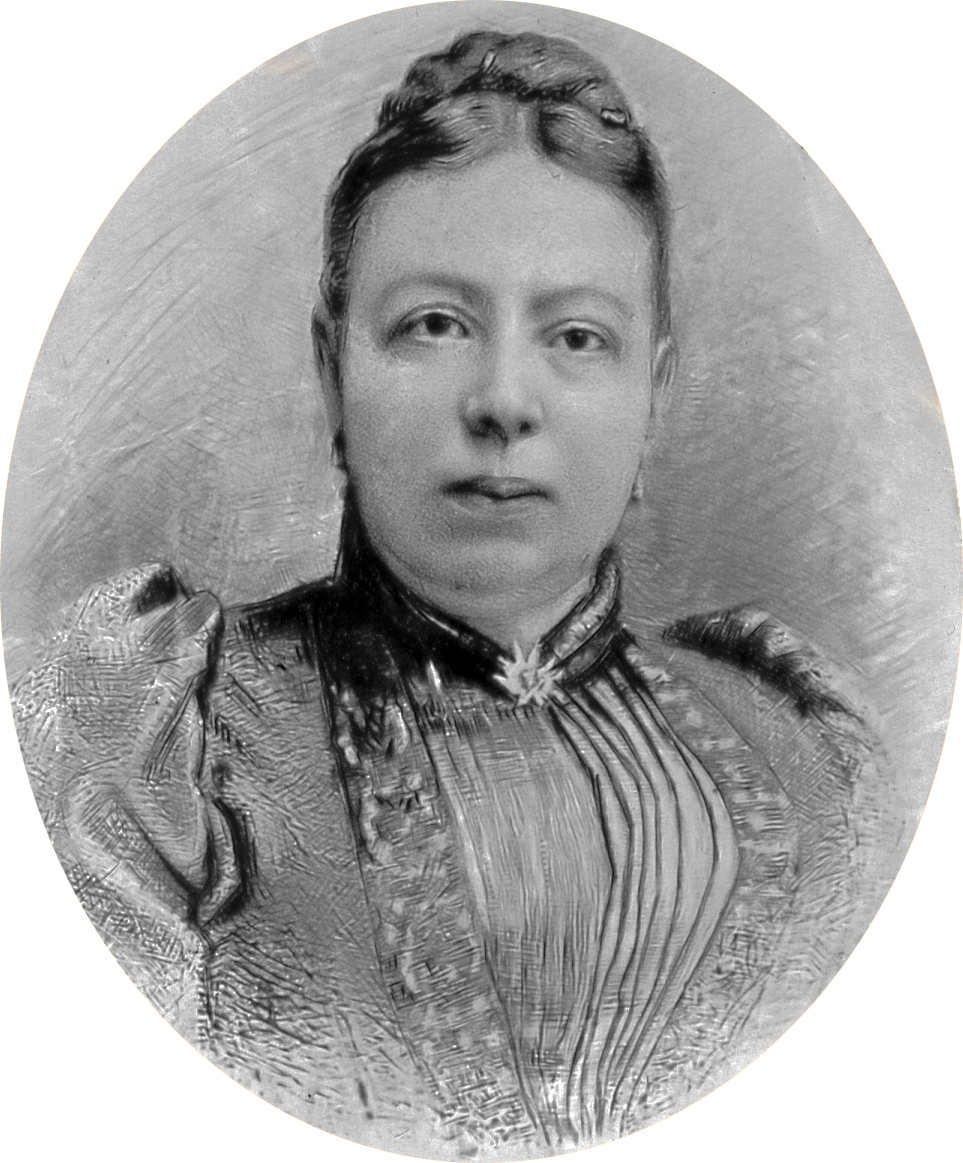
- Born: January 13, 1853; Semarang, Java, Indonesia
- Died: June 13, 1927 (aged 74); Noordwijk, Netherlands
- Writing career
- Pen name: Melati van Java
- Genres: novel, children's literature

Melati van Java was the pen name of Nicolina Maria "Marie" Sloot (January 13, 1853 – June 13, 1927). She was a Dutch East Indies-born Dutch writer. During the period around the start of the 20th century, her novels were popular with the Dutch public.

The daughter of Wiesje van Haastert and Carel Sloot, she was born in Semarang in Java. She was mainly educated at home. In 1871, her family returned to the Netherlands, first living in The Hague and later in Roermond. Her mother died after the family settled in Roermond; her father remarried and she moved to Amsterdam afterwards in 1881. She began publishing under the name Mathilde in 1872, later using Melati van Java. In 1893, she was invited to join Maatschappij der Nederlandse Letterkunde, the Dutch literary society, one of the first women to become a member. Later in life, she also used the pseudonym Max van Ravestein.

She was editor of De Huisvriend and Vrouwenwereld. She also contributed to various publications, including Katholieke Illustratie and Boekenschouw. During and after World War I, she was active in the Roman Catholic women's movement.

Some of her work was translated into German, French and Danish.

She died in Noordwijk in South Holland province at the age of 74.

== Selected works ==
- De jonkvrouwe van Groenerode, semi-autobiographical novel (1875)
- De familie van den resident, novel (1875)
- Anonciade (1876), under the name Mathilde
- In de Lente vergaard (1876)
- Angeline's beloften, children's literature (1879)
- Dorenzathe, novel (1880)
- Hermelijn, novel (1885)
- Het Viooltje van St. Germain, children's literature (1885)
- Nazomer (1888)
- Ontmaskerd, children's literature (1888)
- De ring der Grootvorstin, children's literature (1889)
