= 2025 Thailand Masters (badminton) =

Badminton tournament in Thailand

Tournament details
- Dates: 28 January – 2 February
- Edition: 8th
- Level: Super 300
- Total prize money: US$240,000
- Venue: Nimibutr Stadium
- Location: Bangkok, Thailand

Champions
- Men's singles: (Singapore) Jason Teh
- Women's singles: (Thailand) Pornpawee Chochuwong
- Men's doubles: (South Korea) Jin Yong (South Korea) Seo Seung-jae
- Women's doubles: (Indonesia) Lanny Tria Mayasari (Indonesia) Siti Fadia Silva Ramadhanti
- Mixed doubles: (Thailand) Dechapol Puavaranukroh (Thailand) Supissara Paewsampran

The 2025 Thailand Masters (officially known as the Princess Sirivannavari Thailand Masters 2025 for sponsorship reasons) was a badminton tournament that took place at the Nimibutr Stadium, Bangkok, Thailand, from 28 January to 2 February 2025 and had a total prize of US$240,000.

== Tournament ==
The 2025 Thailand Masters was the fourth tournament of the 2025 BWF World Tour and was part of the Thailand Masters championships, which had been held since 2016. This tournament was organized by the Badminton Association of Thailand with sanction from the BWF.

=== Venue ===
This tournament was held at the Nimibutr Stadium in Bangkok, Thailand.

=== Point distribution ===
Below is the point distribution table for each phase of the tournament based on the BWF points system for the BWF World Tour Super 300 event.

Winner	Runner-up	3/4	5/8	9/16	17/32	33/64	65/128
7,000	5,950	4,900	3,850	2,750	1,670	660	320

=== Prize pool ===
The total prize money was US$240,000 with the distribution of the prize money in accordance with BWF regulations.

Event	Winner	Finalist	Semi-finals	Quarter-finals	Last 16
Singles	$18,000	$9,120	$3,480	$1,440	$840
Doubles	$18,960	$9,120	$3,360	$1,740	$900

== Men's singles ==
=== Seeds ===
1. (Thailand) Kunlavut Vitidsarn (withdrew)
2. (Hong Kong) Ng Ka Long (second round)
3. (Indonesia) Chico Aura Dwi Wardoyo (second round)
4. (Singapore) Jason Teh (champion)
5. (South Korea) Jeon Hyeok-jin (quarter-finals)
6. (China) Wang Zhengxing (final)
7. (Thailand) Kantaphon Wangcharoen (second round)
8. (Republic of Ireland) Nhat Nguyen (semi-finals)

=== Finals ===
Semi-finals
Q2	(China) Zhu Xuanchen	21	13	16
6	(China) Wang Zhengxing	13	21	21
4	(Singapore) Jason Teh	19	21	21
8	(Republic of Ireland) Nhat Nguyen	21	18	9

Final
6	(China) Wang Zhengxing	18	21	19
4	(Singapore) Jason Teh	21	15	21

=== Top half ===
==== Section 1 ====
First round
3	(Indonesia) C A Dwi Wardoyo	21	21
(India) T Mannepalli	11	15
(Malaysia) Cheam J W	21	15	19
(India) S Subramanian	15	21	21
7	(Thailand) K Wangcharoen	21	19	21
(Thailand) P Teeraratsakul	17	21	16
Q2	(China) Zhu XC	21	21
(Vietnam) Lê Đ P	7	13

Second round
3	(Indonesia) C A Dwi Wardoyo	21	10	17
(India) S Subramanian	9	21	21
7	(Thailand) K Wangcharoen	15	21	14
Q2	(China) Zhu XC	21	13	21

Quarter-finals
(India) S Subramanian	21	18	13
Q2	(China) Zhu XC	19	21	21

==== Section 2 ====
First round
6	(China) Wang ZX	23	21
Q3	(Thailand) S Jamsri	21	19
PFQ	(India) M Manjunath	14	13
PFQ	(Malaysia) Aidil S	21	21
SWM	(Hong Kong) J Gunawan	21	21
(Chinese Taipei) Huang Y-k	14	9
(India) S Kidambi	21	21
(Israel) D Dubovenko	13	18

Second round
6	(China) Wang ZX	21	21
PFQ	(Malaysia) Aidil S	9	15
SWM	(Hong Kong) J Gunawan	19	15
(India) S Kidambi	21	21

Quarter-finals
6	(China) Wang ZX	21	21
(India) S Kidambi	17	16

=== Bottom half ===
==== Section 3 ====
First round
Q1	(Malaysia) Kok J H	21	21
(India) A Shetty	15	17
PFQ	(Chinese Taipei) Wang P-w	15	21	15
5	(South Korea) Jeon H-j	21	9	21
(Malaysia) J Hoh	21	12	13
Q4	(Indonesia) Z Ubaidillah	17	21	21
(Israel) M Zilberman	17	24	14
4	(Singapore) J Teh	21	22	21

Second round
Q1	(Malaysia) Kok J H	13	18
5	(South Korea) Jeon H-j	21	21
Q4	(Indonesia) Z Ubaidillah	21	15
4	(Singapore) J Teh	23	21

Quarter-finals
5	(South Korea) Jeon H-j	13	18
4	(Singapore) J Teh	21	21

==== Section 4 ====
First round
(Sri Lanka) V Nettasinghe	21	14	22
(Belgium) J Carraggi	19	21	24
(Denmark) M Johannesen	19	10
8	(Republic of Ireland) N Nguyen	21	21
(India) R Sanjeevi	15	18
(Indonesia) A Farhan	21	21
(Indonesia) Y S Marcellyno	11	14
2	(Hong Kong) Ng K L	21	21

Second round
(Belgium) J Carraggi	5	14
8	(Republic of Ireland) N Nguyen	21	21
(Indonesia) A Farhan	21	16	21
2	(Hong Kong) Ng K L	8	21	12

Quarter-finals
8	(Republic of Ireland) N Nguyen	21	13	21
(Indonesia) A Farhan	19	21	19

== Women's singles ==
=== Seeds ===
1. (Thailand) Pornpawee Chochuwong (champion)
2. (Thailand) Ratchanok Intanon (second round)
3. (Indonesia) Putri Kusuma Wardani (semi-finals)
4. (Denmark) Line Kjærsfeldt (second round)
5. (South Korea) Sim Yu-jin (quarter-finals)
6. (India) Malvika Bansod (withdrew)
7. (Thailand) Pornpicha Choeikeewong (quarter-finals)
8. (Indonesia) Komang Ayu Cahya Dewi (final)

=== Finals ===
Semi-finals
1	(Thailand) Pornpawee Chochuwong	21	21
3	(Indonesia) Putri Kusuma Wardani	14	15
(Thailand) Thamonwan Nithiittikrai	17	21	9
8	(Indonesia) Komang Ayu Cahya Dewi	21	7	21

Final
1	(Thailand) Pornpawee Chochuwong	18	21	21
8	(Indonesia) Komang Ayu Cahya Dewi	21	16	13

=== Top half ===
==== Section 1 ====
First round
1	(Thailand) P Chochuwong	21	21
(Myanmar) Thet Htar T	7	13
(China) Dai W	17	21	13
PFQ	(Chinese Taipei) Chen S-y	21	5	21
5	(South Korea) Sim Y-j	21	21
Q2	(Chinese Taipei) Hsieh Y-e	18	17
(Hong Kong) Lo S Y	21	13	15
Q4	(Thailand) T Kleebyeesun	19	21	21

Second round
1	(Thailand) P Chochuwong	21	21
PFQ	(Chinese Taipei) Chen S-y	15	11
5	(South Korea) Sim Y-j	21	21
Q4	(Thailand) T Kleebyeesun	15	12

Quarter-finals
1	(Thailand) P Chochuwong	21	13	21
5	(South Korea) Sim Y-j	16	21	14

==== Section 2 ====
First round
3	(Indonesia) P K Wardani	21	21
(Hong Kong) S S Mehta	19	11
(India) T Hemanth	21	11	13
(Malaysia) Kisona S	15	21	21
7	(Thailand) P Choeikeewong	21	21
PFQ	(Indonesia) Y Y Susanto	17	17
(Thailand) L Chaiwan	21	21
(Hungary) Á Kőrösi	12	14

Second round
3	(Indonesia) P K Wardani	13	21	21
(Malaysia) Kisona S	21	14	17
7	(Thailand) P Choeikeewong	25	22	21
(Thailand) L Chaiwan	27	20	19

Quarter-finals
3	(Indonesia) P K Wardani	21	21
7	(Thailand) P Choeikeewong	10	14

=== Bottom half ===
==== Section 3 ====
First round
(Malaysia) Letshanaa K	10	24	18
(Chinese Taipei) Tung C-t	21	22	21
(China) Wu LY	19	16
SWM	(India) R Ramraj	21	21
(Thailand) T Nithiittikrai	21	21
Q1	(India) T Shah	15	16
(Peru) I Castillo	17	5
4	(Denmark) L Kjærsfeldt	21	21

Second round
(Chinese Taipei) Tung C-t	15	12
SWM	(India) R Ramraj	21	21
(Thailand) T Nithiittikrai	22	21
4	(Denmark) L Kjærsfeldt	20	13

Quarter-finals
SWM	(India) R Ramraj	21	14	9
(Thailand) T Nithiittikrai	19	21	21

==== Section 4 ====
First round
(Chinese Taipei) Huang Y-h	23	21
(Denmark) A Schulz	21	11
(Czech Republic) T Švábíková	12	11
8	(Indonesia) K A C Dewi	21	21
PFQ	(Thailand) P Opatniputh	21	21
(India) S Valishetty	17	13
Q3	(Thailand) N Rattanapanuwong	9	10
2	(Thailand) R Intanon	21	21

Second round
(Chinese Taipei) Huang Y-h	21	16	4
8	(Indonesia) K A C Dewi	18	21	21
PFQ	(Thailand) P Opatniputh	17	21	21
2	(Thailand) R Intanon	21	18	16

Quarter-finals
8	(Indonesia) K A C Dewi	21	21
PFQ	(Thailand) P Opatniputh	18	17

== Men's doubles ==
=== Seeds ===
1. (Indonesia) Leo Rolly Carnando / Bagas Maulana (quarter-finals)
2. (Indonesia) Muhammad Shohibul Fikri / Daniel Marthin (final)
3. (Thailand) Peeratchai Sukphun / Pakkapon Teeraratsakul (quarter-finals)
4. (China) Xie Haonan / Zeng Weihan (semi-finals)
5. (South Korea) Kang Min-hyuk / Kim Won-ho (quarter-finals)
6. (China) Huang Di / Liu Yang (second round)
7. (Thailand) Kittinupong Kedren / Dechapol Puavaranukroh (semi-finals)
8. (India) Pruthvi Roy / K. Sai Pratheek (quarter-finals)

=== Finals ===
Semi-finals
(South Korea) Jin Yong (South Korea) Seo Seung-jae	21	21
4	(China) Xie Haonan (China) Zeng Weihan	15	16
7	(Thailand) Kittinupong Kedren (Thailand) Dechapol Puavaranukroh	17	13
2	(Indonesia) Muhammad Shohibul Fikri (Indonesia) Daniel Marthin	21	21

Final
(South Korea) Jin Yong (South Korea) Seo Seung-jae	21	21
2	(Indonesia) Muhammad Shohibul Fikri (Indonesia) Daniel Marthin	18	17

=== Top half ===
==== Section 1 ====
First round
1	(Indonesia) L R Carnando (Indonesia) B Maulana	21	21
(Malaysia) Chia W J (Malaysia) Lwi S H	15	12
(Malaysia) Goh B Z (Malaysia) Wong V S	8	16
(South Korea) Choi S-g (Malaysia) Goh V S	21	21
6	(China) Huang D (China) Liu Y	21	18	21
(Thailand) T Madee (Thailand) W Sothon	11	21	16
(South Korea) Jin Y (South Korea) Seo S-j	21	17	21
(Chinese Taipei) Lai P-y (Chinese Taipei) Tsai F-c	11	21	9

Second round
1	(Indonesia) L R Carnando (Indonesia) B Maulana	21	21
(South Korea) Choi S-g (Malaysia) Goh V S	11	18
6	(China) Huang D (China) Liu Y	18	13
(South Korea) Jin Y (South Korea) Seo S-j	21	21

Quarter-finals
1	(Indonesia) L R Carnando (Indonesia) B Maulana	18	16
(South Korea) Jin Y (South Korea) Seo S-j	21	21

==== Section 2 ====
First round
4	(China) Xie HN (China) Zeng WH	21	21
(China) Sun WJ (China) Zhu YJ	16	17
(Malaysia) B Goonting (Malaysia) Fazriq R	23	21	16
Q2	(Singapore) Loh K H (Singapore) H Wong	25	18	21
5	(South Korea) Kang M-h (South Korea) Kim W-h	21	21
(Hong Kong) Hung K C (Hong Kong) Lui C W	11	8
(India) H Amsakarunan (India) R Kumar	21	21
Q1	(Thailand) P Jamtubtim (Thailand) R Makkasasithorn	18	12

Second round
4	(China) Xie HN (China) Zeng WH	19	23	21
Q2	(Singapore) Loh K H (Singapore) H Wong	21	21	11
5	(South Korea) Kang M-h (South Korea) Kim W-h	16	21	21
(India) H Amsakarunan (India) R Kumar	21	8	10

Quarter-finals
4	(China) Xie HN (China) Zeng WH	19	21	22
5	(South Korea) Kang M-h (South Korea) Kim W-h	21	8	20

=== Bottom half ===
==== Section 3 ====
First round
(Thailand) N Mangkornloi (Thailand) S Sae-ma	15	12
(Indonesia) R Hidayat (Indonesia) Y Rambitan	21	21
(Denmark) W K Boe (Denmark) C F Kjær	9	19
7	(Thailand) K Kedren (Thailand) D Puavaranukroh	21	21
(Malaysia) Low H Y (Malaysia) Ng E C	17	19
(Thailand) C Charoenkitamorn (Thailand) W Thongsa-nga	21	21
Q4	(Thailand) P Kaosamaang (Thailand) T Punpanich	19	9
3	(Thailand) P Sukphun (Thailand) P Teeraratsakul	21	21

Second round
(Indonesia) R Hidayat (Indonesia) Y Rambitan	7	17
7	(Thailand) K Kedren (Thailand) D Puavaranukroh	21	21
(Thailand) C Charoenkitamorn (Thailand) W Thongsa-nga	23	16
3	(Thailand) P Sukphun (Thailand) P Teeraratsakul	25	21

Quarter-finals
7	(Thailand) K Kedren (Thailand) D Puavaranukroh	21	21
3	(Thailand) P Sukphun (Thailand) P Teeraratsakul	17	15

==== Section 4 ====
First round
Q3	(Thailand) V Kanjanakeereewong (Thailand) N Laotherdpong	21	21
(India) A Mohanty (India) A Pattanayak	14	13
(Singapore) W Koh (Singapore) J Kubo	21	13	13
8	(India) P Roy (India) K S Pratheek	16	21	21
(Malaysia) Kang K X (Malaysia) A Tai	21	21
(Thailand) P Thongkham (Thailand) W Thongkham	18	16
PFQ	(India) Vip Kuvale (India) Vir Kuvale	10	13
2	(Indonesia) M S Fikri (Indonesia) D Marthin	21	21

Second round
Q3	(Thailand) V Kanjanakeereewong (Thailand) N Laotherdpong	21	10	9
8	(India) P Roy (India) K S Pratheek	14	21	21
(Malaysia) Kang K X (Malaysia) A Tai	21	16	14
2	(Indonesia) M S Fikri (Indonesia) D Marthin	19	21	21

Quarter-finals
8	(India) P Roy (India) K S Pratheek	19	18
2	(Indonesia) M S Fikri (Indonesia) D Marthin	21	21

== Women's doubles ==
=== Seeds ===
1. (Indonesia) Febriana Dwipuji Kusuma / Amallia Cahaya Pratiwi (first round)
2. (India) Treesa Jolly / Gayatri Gopichand (withdrew)
3. (Thailand) Benyapa Aimsaard / Nuntakarn Aimsaard (semi-finals)
4. (Thailand) Laksika Kanlaha / Phataimas Muenwong (final)
5. (China) Jia Yifan / Zhang Shuxian (withdrew)
6. (Indonesia) Lanny Tria Mayasari / Siti Fadia Silva Ramadhanti (champions)
7. (Indonesia) Meilysa Trias Puspita Sari / Rachel Allessya Rose (semi-finals)
8. (Chinese Taipei) Lin Xiao-min / Wang Yu-qiao (quarter-finals)

=== Finals ===
Semi-finals
7	(Indonesia) Meilysa Trias Puspita Sari (Indonesia) Rachel Allessya Rose	19	7
4	(Thailand) Laksika Kanlaha (Thailand) Phataimas Muenwong	21	21
6	(Indonesia) Lanny Tria Mayasari (Indonesia) Siti Fadia Silva Ramadhanti	21	21
3	(Thailand) Benyapa Aimsaard (Thailand) Nuntakarn Aimsaard	16	17

Final
4	(Thailand) Laksika Kanlaha (Thailand) Phataimas Muenwong	21	13	8
6	(Indonesia) Lanny Tria Mayasari (Indonesia) Siti Fadia Silva Ramadhanti	15	21	21

=== Top half ===
==== Section 1 ====
First round
1	(Indonesia) F D Kusuma (Indonesia) A C Pratiwi	21	21	15
(Chinese Taipei) Hsu Y-c (Chinese Taipei) Sung Y-h	23	9	21
(Thailand) K Chaichana (Thailand) P Polyiam	21	21
Q2	(Thailand) S Lekjura (Thailand) A Napalai	10	15
7	(Indonesia) M T Puspita Sari (Indonesia) R A Rose	21	21	21
(China) Keng SL (China) Wang ZM	23	13	13
(South Korea) Lee Y-w (South Korea) Lee Y-l	21	21
(Sweden) M Sjöö (Sweden) T Sjöö	13	12

Second round
(Chinese Taipei) Hsu Y-c (Chinese Taipei) Sung Y-h	21	21
(Thailand) K Chaichana (Thailand) P Polyiam	11	10
7	(Indonesia) M T Puspita Sari (Indonesia) R A Rose	21	21
(South Korea) Lee Y-w (South Korea) Lee Y-l	17	19

Quarter-finals
(Chinese Taipei) Hsu Y-c (Chinese Taipei) Sung Y-h	15	21	15
7	(Indonesia) M T Puspita Sari (Indonesia) R A Rose	21	19	21

==== Section 2 ====
First round
4	(Thailand) L Kanlaha (Thailand) P Muenwong	21	21
(Poland) P Hankiewicz (Poland) K Marczak	16	8
(Thailand) P Phatcharaphisutsin (Thailand) N Sukklad	14	21	9
(Japan) R Hiramoto (Japan) M Kawazoe	21	16	21
8	(Chinese Taipei) Lin X-m (Chinese Taipei) Wang Y-q	21	19	21
Q1	(Thailand) N Roongpiboonsopit (Thailand) S Roongpiboonsopit	13	21	10
(India) K Selvam (India) S Singhi	17	14
(Malaysia) Ong X Y (Malaysia) C Ting	21	21

Second round
4	(Thailand) L Kanlaha (Thailand) P Muenwong	11	21	22
(Japan) R Hiramoto (Japan) M Kawazoe	21	19	20
8	(Chinese Taipei) Lin X-m (Chinese Taipei) Wang Y-q	21	23
(Malaysia) Ong X Y (Malaysia) C Ting	17	21

Quarter-finals
4	(Thailand) L Kanlaha (Thailand) P Muenwong	16	25	21
8	(Chinese Taipei) Lin X-m (Chinese Taipei) Wang Y-q	21	23	16

=== Bottom half ===
==== Section 3 ====
First round
(Thailand) Y Ketklieng (Thailand) P-O Phannachet	21	21
PFQ	(Thailand) W Chitcharoen (Thailand) H Momin	11	9
PFQ	(Thailand) P Pannarai (Thailand) S Tepnarong	9	8
6	(Indonesia) L T Mayasari (Indonesia) S F S Ramadhanti	21	21
(China) Li HZ (China) Luo Y	21	21
(Poland) A Khomich (Poland) D Zimnol	10	19
(Hong Kong) Lui L L (Hong Kong) Tsang H Y	21	22
SWM	(Thailand) O Jongsathapornparn (Thailand) S Suwachai	14	20

Second round
(Thailand) Y Ketklieng (Thailand) P-O Phannachet	9	12
6	(Indonesia) L T Mayasari (Indonesia) S F S Ramadhanti	21	21
(China) Li HZ (China) Luo Y	20	13
(Hong Kong) Lui L L (Hong Kong) Tsang H Y	22	21

Quarter-finals
6	(Indonesia) L T Mayasari (Indonesia) S F S Ramadhanti	21	21
(Hong Kong) Lui L L (Hong Kong) Tsang H Y	15	9

==== Section 4 ====
First round
Q3	(Thailand) P Aiamvareesrisakul (Thailand) S Janpeng	16	21	16
Q4	(Thailand) H Mijad (Thailand) N Tungkasatan	21	18	21
(Thailand) T Kleebyeesun (Thailand) N Laisuan	21	21
SWM	(Denmark) A C Kudsk (Denmark) S Schulz	6	12
PFQ	(Thailand) P Pattanawaritthipan (Thailand) P Phanthui	5	11
(Hong Kong) Leung Y Y (Hong Kong) Ng W Y	21	21
(Chinese Taipei) Chen S-y (Chinese Taipei) Hsieh Y-e	17	18
3	(Thailand) B Aimsaard (Thailand) N Aimsaard	21	21

Second round
Q4	(Thailand) H Mijad (Thailand) N Tungkasatan	21	21
(Thailand) T Kleebyeesun (Thailand) N Laisuan	19	12
(Hong Kong) Leung Y Y (Hong Kong) Ng W Y	21	14	11
3	(Thailand) B Aimsaard (Thailand) N Aimsaard	13	21	21

Quarter-finals
Q4	(Thailand) H Mijad (Thailand) N Tungkasatan	10	12
3	(Thailand) B Aimsaard (Thailand) N Aimsaard	21	21

== Mixed doubles ==
=== Seeds ===
1. (China) Guo Xinwa / Chen Fanghui (withdrew)
2. (Thailand) Ruttanapak Oupthong / Jhenicha Sudjaipraparat (second round)
3. (Thailand) Pakkapon Teeraratsakul / Phataimas Muenwong (quarter-finals)
4. (Thailand) Dechapol Puavaranukroh / Supissara Paewsampran (champions)
5. (Indonesia) Rehan Naufal Kusharjanto / Gloria Emanuelle Widjaja (second round)
6. (Indonesia) Jafar Hidayatullah / Felisha Pasaribu (semi-finals)
7. (Indonesia) Adnan Maulana / Indah Cahya Sari Jamil (quarter-finals)
8. (Indonesia) Amri Syahnawi / Nita Violina Marwah (quarter-finals)

=== Finals ===
Semi-finals
6	(Indonesia) Jafar Hidayatullah (Indonesia) Felisha Pasaribu	21	10	15
(Indonesia) Dejan Ferdinansyah (Indonesia) Siti Fadia Silva Ramadhanti	13	21	21
4	(Thailand) Dechapol Puavaranukroh (Thailand) Supissara Paewsampran	21	21
(China) Gao Jiaxuan (China) Wu Mengying	18	16

Final
(Indonesia) Dejan Ferdinansyah (Indonesia) Siti Fadia Silva Ramadhanti	21	17	13
4	(Thailand) Dechapol Puavaranukroh (Thailand) Supissara Paewsampran	19	21	21

=== Top half ===
==== Section 1 ====
First round
3	(Thailand) P Teeraratsakul (Thailand) P Muenwong	21	21
(Denmark) R Espersen (Denmark) A C Kudsk	17	13
(Thailand) S Jomkoh (Thailand) S Taerattanachai	21	21
(Hong Kong) Hung K C (Hong Kong) Tsang H Y	11	8
6	(Indonesia) J Hidayatullah (Indonesia) F Pasaribu	21	21
(Indonesia) V Y Mulia (Indonesia) P H Mentari	18	17
(Thailand) K Karnnithiwat (Thailand) W Chitcharoen	20	16
Q2	(Thailand) S Ariyabaraneekul (Thailand) A Povanon	22	21

Second round
3	(Thailand) P Teeraratsakul (Thailand) P Muenwong	15	21	21
(Thailand) S Jomkoh (Thailand) S Taerattanachai	21	18	18
6	(Indonesia) J Hidayatullah (Indonesia) F Pasaribu	21	21
Q2	(Thailand) S Ariyabaraneekul (Thailand) A Povanon	10	10

Quarter-finals
3	(Thailand) P Teeraratsakul (Thailand) P Muenwong	15	12
6	(Indonesia) J Hidayatullah (Indonesia) F Pasaribu	21	21

==== Section 2 ====
First round
SWM	(India) R Kapoor (India) R Gadde	21	21
Q1	(Thailand) W Phakjarung (Thailand) S Chueboca	8	16
PFQ	(Thailand) R Makkasasithorn (Thailand) N Laisuan	21	10	21
(Chinese Taipei) Lai P-y (Chinese Taipei) Lin X-m	18	21	16
5	(Indonesia) R N Kusharjanto (Indonesia) G E Widjaja	18	22	21
(Indonesia) R Rivaldy (Indonesia) L A Kusumawati	21	20	15
(Indonesia) D Ferdinansyah (Indonesia) S F S Ramadhanti	21	21
(Macau) Leong I C (Macau) Ng W C	15	3

Second round
SWM	(India) R Kapoor (India) R Gadde	19	15
PFQ	(Thailand) R Makkasasithorn (Thailand) N Laisuan	21	21
5	(Indonesia) R N Kusharjanto (Indonesia) G E Widjaja	19	13
(Indonesia) D Ferdinansyah (Indonesia) S F S Ramadhanti	21	21

Quarter-finals
PFQ	(Thailand) R Makkasasithorn (Thailand) N Laisuan	20	14
(Indonesia) D Ferdinansyah (Indonesia) S F S Ramadhanti	22	21

=== Bottom half ===
==== Section 3 ====
First round
(Israel) M Zilberman (Israel) S Zilberman	13	6
(Malaysia) Loo B K (Malaysia) Ho L E	21	21
(Indonesia) M Faza (Indonesia) A S P Pranata	21	14	15
7	(Indonesia) A Maulana (Indonesia) I C S Jamil	18	21	21
Q4	(Thailand) V Kanjanakeereewong (Thailand) P Rungruengpramong	21	12
(Hong Kong) Yeung S C (Hong Kong) Lui L L	23	21
Q3	(Chinese Taipei) Tsai F-c (Chinese Taipei) Sung Y-h	9	9
4	(Thailand) D Puavaranukroh (Thailand) S Paewsampran	21	21

Second round
(Malaysia) Loo B K (Malaysia) Ho L E	7	21	14
7	(Indonesia) A Maulana (Indonesia) I C S Jamil	21	18	21
(Hong Kong) Yeung S C (Hong Kong) Lui L L	9	4
4	(Thailand) D Puavaranukroh (Thailand) S Paewsampran	21	21

Quarter-finals
7	(Indonesia) A Maulana (Indonesia) I C S Jamil	15	13
4	(Thailand) D Puavaranukroh (Thailand) S Paewsampran	21	21

==== Section 4 ====
First round
(China) Li HY (China) Bao LJ	21	12	21
(Hong Kong) Lui C W (Hong Kong) Fu C Y	17	21	19
(Hong Kong) Tang C M (Hong Kong) Ng T Y	16	21	16
8	(Indonesia) A Syahnawi (Indonesia) N V Marwah	21	13	21
(Thailand) P Horbanluekit (Thailand) F Korpthammakit	21	18	16
(China) Gao JX (China) Wu MY	18	21	21
(Poland) R Cybulski (Poland) K Marczak	12	13
2	(Thailand) R Oupthong (Thailand) J Sudjaipraparat	21	21

Second round
(China) Li HY (China) Bao LJ	18	18
8	(Indonesia) A Syahnawi (Indonesia) N V Marwah	21	21
(China) Gao JX (China) Wu MY	21	22
2	(Thailand) R Oupthong (Thailand) J Sudjaipraparat	18	20

Quarter-finals
8	(Indonesia) A Syahnawi (Indonesia) N V Marwah	21	10	19
(China) Gao JX (China) Wu MY	10	21	21

Preceded by 2025 Indonesia Masters	BWF World Tour; 2025 BWF season	Succeeded by 2025 German Open
