= Amri Syahnawi =

Indonesian badminton player (born 1998)

Personal information
- Born: 8 November 1998 (age 28) Jakarta, Indonesia

Sport
- Country: Indonesia
- Sport: Badminton
- Handedness: Right

Mixed doubles
- Highest ranking: 9 (XD with Nita Violina Marwah, 27 October 2026); 42 (XD with Winny Oktavina Kandow, 25 April 2023)
- Current ranking: 9 (XD with Nita Violina Marwah, 27 October 2026)
- BWF profile
Medal record
Men's badminton
Representing Indonesia
World Championships
Bronze medal – third place	2026 New Delhi	Mixed doubles
Asian Games
Gold medal – first place	2026 Aichi–Nagoya	Men's team
Silver medal – second place	2026 Aichi–Nagoya	Mixed doubles
SEA Games
Gold medal – first place	2025 Thailand	Men's team

Amri Syahnawi (born 8 November 1998) is an Indonesian badminton player who specializes in doubles. He won the silver medal at the 2026 Asian Games, and a bronze medal at the 2026 World Championships in the mixed doubles with Nita Violina Marwah. Syahnawi and Marwah broke into the top 10 BWF world rankings on 27 October 2026.

== Career ==
=== 2023 ===
In January, Amri Syahnawi and his partner Winny Oktavina Kandow competed at the Thailand Masters, but had to lose in the quarter-finals from 5th seed Korean pair Seo Seung-jae and Chae Yoo-jung.

In March, Syahnawi and Kandow competed in the European tour at the Spain Masters, but had to lose in the quarter-finals from Danish pair Mathias Thyrri and Amalie Magelund. In the next tour, Syahnawi and Kandow lost again in the quarter-finals at the Orléans Masters in France, this time from Chinese Taipei pair Ye Hong-wei and Lee Chia-hsin.

In May, Syahnawi and Kandow competed in the second Asian tour at the Malaysia Masters, but had to lose in qualifying rounds from Chinese Taipei pair Lee Jhe-huei and Hsu Ya-ching.

In September, Syahnawi and Kandow as the 4th seed lost at the first round of Indonesia Masters Super 100 I from Thai pair Tanupat Viriyangkura and Alisa Sapniti in rubber games.

=== 2026 ===
In 2026, Syahnawi made his debut at the Asian Games in 2026 Aichi–Nagoya. Entrusted as captain, he led the Indonesian squad to win the gold medal in the men's team event. Syahnawi and Marwah then captured the silver medal in the individual mixed doubles after being defeated by Jiang Zhenbang and Wei Yaxin in the final.

== Achievements ==
=== BWF World Championships ===
Mixed doubles
Year	Venue	Partner	Opponent	Score	Result	Ref.
2026	Indira Gandhi Arena; New Delhi, India	(Indonesia) Nita Violina Marwah	(China) Feng Yanzhe (China) Huang Dongping	22–20, 14–21, 20–22	Bronze	

=== Asian Games ===
Mixed doubles
Year	Venue	Partner	Opponent	Score	Result	Ref.
2026	Ichinomiya City Municipal Gymnasium; Ichinomiya, Japan	(Indonesia) Nita Violina Marwah	(China) Jiang Zhenbang (China) Wei Yaxin	19–21, 8–21	Silver	

=== ASEAN University Games ===
Men's doubles
Year	Venue	Partner	Opponent	Score	Result
2018	Wunna Theikdi Indoor Stadium; Naypyidaw, Myanmar	(Indonesia) Rian Swastedian	(Malaysia) Low Juan Shen (Malaysia) Nur Mohd Azriyn Ayub	21–16, 8–21, 27–25	Gold

Mixed doubles
Year	Venue	Partner	Opponent	Score	Result
2018	Wunna Theikdi Indoor Stadium; Naypyidaw, Myanmar	(Indonesia) Shela Devi Aulia	(Malaysia) Nur Mohd Azriyn Ayub (Malaysia) Anna Cheong	21–11, 17–21, 16–21	Silver

=== BWF World Tour (1 title) ===
The BWF World Tour, which was announced on 19 March 2017 and implemented in 2018, is a series of elite badminton tournaments sanctioned by the Badminton World Federation (BWF). The BWF World Tours are divided into levels of World Tour Finals, Super 1000, Super 750, Super 500, Super 300 (part of the HSBC World Tour), and the BWF Tour Super 100.

Mixed doubles
Year	Tournament	Level	Partner	Opponent	Score	Result	Ref.
2024 (II)	Indonesia Masters	Super 100	(Indonesia) Nita Violina Marwah	(Indonesia) Marwan Faza (Indonesia) Aisyah Pranata	22–20, 21–13	(gold) Winner	

=== BWF International Challenge/Series (9 titles, 5 runners-up) ===
Men's doubles
Year	Tournament	Partner	Opponent	Score	Result
2018	Indonesia International Series	(Indonesia) Rian Swastedian	(Indonesia) Irfan Fadhilah (Indonesia) Markis Kido	21–19, 21–18	(gold) Winner
2019	Indonesia International Challenge	(Indonesia) Muhammad Fachrikar	(South Korea) Kang Min-hyuk (South Korea) Kim Jae-hwan	17–21, 21–11, 15–21	(silver) Runner-up
2021	Bahrain International Series	(Indonesia) Christopher David Wijaya	(Indonesia) Putra Erwiansyah (Indonesia) Patra Harapan Rindorindo	21–13, 21–13	(gold) Winner
2021	Bahrain International Challenge	(Indonesia) Christopher David Wijaya	(Indonesia) Raymond Indra (Indonesia) Daniel Edgar Marvino	20–22, 21–18, 20–22	(silver) Runner-up

Mixed doubles
Year	Tournament	Partner	Opponent	Score	Result	Ref.
2018	Indonesia International Series	(Indonesia) Shela Devi Aulia	(Indonesia) Irfan Fadhilah (Indonesia) Pia Zebadiah Bernadet	21–17, 21–16	(gold) Winner	
2019	Malaysia International	(Indonesia) Pia Zebadiah Bernadet	(Indonesia) Andika Ramadiansyah (Indonesia) Bunga Fitriani Romadhini	21–15, 21–17	(gold) Winner	
2022	Lithuanian International	(Indonesia) Winny Oktavina Kandow	(Hong Kong) Lui Chun Wai (Hong Kong) Fu Chi Yan	21–6, 21–11	(gold) Winner	
2022	Bonn International	(Indonesia) Winny Oktavina Kandow	(France) Samy Corvée (France) Flavie Vallet	21–7, 21–7	(gold) Winner	
2022	Nantes International	(Indonesia) Winny Oktavina Kandow	(Thailand) Ratchapol Makkasasithorn (Thailand) Jhenicha Sudjaipraparat	21–15, 21–18	(gold) Winner	
2024	Vietnam International	(Indonesia) Indah Cahya Sari Jamil	(Thailand) Pakkapon Teeraratsakul (Thailand) Phataimas Muenwong	19–21, 12–21	(silver) Runner-up	
2024	Slovenia Open	(Indonesia) Indah Cahya Sari Jamil	(Indonesia) Verrel Yustin Mulia (Indonesia) Priskila Elsadai	15–21, 22–20, 21–19	(gold) Winner	
2024	Austrian Open	(Indonesia) Indah Cahya Sari Jamil	(Indonesia) Marwan Faza (Indonesia) Felisha Pasaribu	15–21, 15–21	(silver) Runner-up	
2024	Malaysia International	(Indonesia) Nita Violina Marwah	(Indonesia) Adnan Maulana (Indonesia) Indah Cahya Sari Jamil	22–24, 21–11, 21–19	(gold) Winner	
2024 (II)	Indonesia International	(Indonesia) Nita Violina Marwah	(Indonesia) Jafar Hidayatullah (Indonesia) Felisha Pasaribu	13–21, 15–21	(silver) Runner-up	

BWF International Challenge tournament
BWF International Series tournament
BWF Future Series tournament

== Performance timeline ==
Key

W	Won	F	Finalist	SF	Semi-finalist
QF	Quarter-finalist	#R	Rounds 4, 3, 2, 1	RR	Round-robin stage
Q#	Qualification round	A	Absent	w/d	Withdrew
G	Gold	S	Silver	B	Bronze
NH	Not held	N/A	Not applicable	DNQ	Did not qualify

=== National team ===
- Junior level

Team events	2016
Asian Junior Championships	QF
World Junior Championships	5th

- Senior level

Team events	2025	2026	Ref
SEA Games	G	NH	
Asian Games	NH	G	

=== Individual competitions ===
==== Junior level ====
- Mixed doubles

Team events	2016
Asian Junior Championships	3R

==== Senior level ====
===== Men's doubles =====
Tournament	BWF World Tour				Best
Tournament	2018	2019	2020	2021	Best
Thailand Open	1R	A		NH	1R ('18)
Indonesia Masters Super 100	2R	2R	NH		2R ('18, '19)
Year-end ranking	156	151	174	248	140

===== Mixed doubles =====
Events	2025	2026	Ref
SEA Games	1R	NH	
Asian Championships	2R	2R	
Asian Games	NH	S	
World Championships	DNQ	B	

Tournament	BWF Superseries / Grand Prix		BWF World Tour									Best	Ref
Tournament	2016	2017	2018	2019	2020	2021	2022	2023	2024	2025	2026	Best	Ref
Indonesia Masters	1R	NH	A							1R	1R	1R ('16, '25, '26)	
Thailand Masters	A					NH		QF	A	QF	SF	SF ('26)	
German Open	A				NH		A			1R	A	1R ('25)	
All England Open	A										QF	QF ('26)	
Swiss Open	A				NH	A					SF	SF ('26)	
Orléans Masters	NH		A		NH	A	2R	QF	A	2R	QF	QF ('23, '26)	
Thailand Open	A					NH	A	Q1	A	SF	2R	SF ('25)	
Malaysia Masters	A					NH	A	Q1	A	2R	2R	2R ('25, '26)	
Indonesia Open	A	Q2	A		NH	A				2R	2R	2R ('25, '26)	
Australian Open	A				NH		1R	A				1R ('22)	
Macau Open	A				NH				A	SF	A	SF ('25)	
Japan Open	A				NH		A			2R	1R	2R ('25)	
China Open	A				NH			A		2R	1R	2R ('25)	
Taipei Open	A				NH		A			2R	A	2R ('25)	
China Masters	A				NH			A		2R	A	2R ('25)	
Indonesia Masters Super 100	NH		1R	QF	NH		QF	1R	SF	A		W ('24 II)	
Indonesia Masters Super 100	NH		1R	QF	NH		QF	SF	W	A		W ('24 II)	
Vietnam Open	A				NH		A		1R	A		1R ('24)	
Denmark Open	A									1R	1R	1R ('25, '26)	
French Open	A				NH	A				1R	QF	QF ('26)	
Hylo Open	A									2R	SF	SF ('26)	
Korea Open	A				NH		A			SF	A	SF ('25)	
Japan Masters	NH							A			2R	2R ('26)	
Hong Kong Open	A				NH			A		1R	2R	2R ('26)	
Guwahati Masters	NH							QF	A			QF ('23)	
Odisha Masters	NH						A	2R	A			2R ('23)	
Spain Masters	NA		A				NH	QF	A	NH		QF ('23)	
Year-end ranking	205	395	186	162	148	203	60	56	76	19		9	
Tournament	2016	2017	2018	2019	2020	2021	2022	2023	2024	2025	2026	Best	Ref
