= Badminton at the 2026 Asian Games – Men's team =

Men's Team at the 2026 Asian Games
- Venue: Ichinomiya City Municipal Gymnasium, Japan
- Dates: 21–24 September 2026
- Competitors: 110 from 13 nations

Medalists
gold medal	Indonesia; Fajar Alfian, Jonatan Christie, Alwi Farhan, Muhammad Shohibul Fikri, Nikolaus Joaquin, Daniel Marthin, Leo Rolly Carnando, Amri Syahnawi, Zaki Ubaidillah, Muhamad Yusuf
silver medal	China; Feng Yanzhe, He Jiting, Jiang Zhenbang, Li Shifeng, Liang Weikeng, Liu Yi, Lu Guangzu, Shi Yuqi, Wang Chang, Weng Hongyang
bronze medal	Thailand; Puritat Arree, Chaloempon Charoenkitamorn, Ruttanapak Oupthong, Dechapol Puavaranukroh, Peeratchai Sukphun, Pakkapon Teeraratsakul, Panitchaphon Teeraratsakul, Worrapol Thongsa-nga, Kunlavut Vitidsarn, Tanawat Yimjit
bronze medal	India; Hariharan Amsakarunan, Prannoy H. S., Dhruv Kapila, Srikanth Kidambi, Arjun M. R., Tharun Mannepalli, Satwiksairaj Rankireddy, Lakshya Sen, Ayush Shetty, Chirag Shetty

The men's team badminton tournament at the 2026 Asian Games was held from 21 to 24 September 2026 at the Ichinomiya City Municipal Gymnasium in Ichinomiya, Japan. Indonesia won the gold medal, defeating defending champions China (3—2) in the final to win the event for the first time since 1998 and end China's run of two consecutive titles. India and Thailand shared the bronze medals.

== Schedule ==
All times are Japanese Standard Time (UTC+09:00)

Date	Day	Time	Event
21 September	Monday	09:30	Round of 16
22 September	Tuesday	15:00	Quarter-finals
23 September	Wednesday	15:00	Semifinals
24 September	Thursday	16:00	Gold medal match

== Squads ==
Bangladesh	China	Chinese Taipei	Hong Kong	India
Ayman Ibn Jaman; Al-Amin Jumar; Moajjam Hossain Ohidul; Gourab Singha	Feng Yanzhe; He Jiting; Jiang Zhenbang; Li Shifeng; Liang Weikeng; Liu Yi; Lu Guangzu; Shi Yuqi; Wang Chang; Weng Hongyang	Chi Yu-jen; Chiu Hsiang-chieh; Chou Tien-chen; Lee Jhe-huei; Lin Chun-yi; Liu Kuang-heng; Wang Chi-lin; Wang Tzu-wei; Yang Po-hsuan; Ye Hong-wei	Chan Yin Chak; Cheung Sai Shing; Deng Chi Fai; Jason Gunawan; Hung Kuei Chun; Lam Ka To; Lee Cheuk Yiu; Lui Chun Wai; Ng Ka Long; Yeung Shing Choi	Hariharan Amsakarunan; Prannoy H. S.; Dhruv Kapila; Srikanth Kidambi; Arjun M. R.; Tharun Mannepalli; Satwiksairaj Rankireddy; Lakshya Sen; Ayush Shetty; Chirag Shetty
Indonesia	Japan	Kazakhstan	Macau	
Fajar Alfian; Jonatan Christie; Alwi Farhan; Muhammad Shohibul Fikri; Nikolaus Joaquin; Daniel Marthin; Leo Rolly Carnando; Amri Syahnawi; Zaki Ubaidillah; Muhamad Yusuf	Takuro Hoki; Yugo Kobayashi; Kakeru Kumagai; Kodai Naraoka; Hiroki Nishi; Kenta Nishimoto; Yuichi Shimogami; Yushi Tanaka; Koki Watanabe; Yuta Watanabe	Khaitmurat Kulmatov; Artur Niyazov; Dmitriy Panarin; Makhsut Tajibullayev	Leong Iok Chong; Pui Chi Chon; Pui Pang Fong; Vong Kok Weng	
Malaysia	Mongolia	Thailand	South Korea	
Chen Tang Jie; Aaron Chia; Eogene Ewe; Goh Soon Huat; Goh Sze Fei; Justin Hoh; Nur Izzuddin; Kong Wei Xiang; Leong Jun Hao; Tee Kai Wun	Davaasuren Battur; Battugs Bayarsaikhan; Gerelsukh Jargalsaikhan; Dulgunn Khishigchuluun; Batdavaa Munkhbat; Bishrelt-Erdene Odbayar; Enkhbat Olonbayar; Usukh-Ireedui Uulensolongo	Puritat Arree; Chaloempon Charoenkitamorn; Ruttanapak Oupthong; Dechapol Puavaranukroh; Peeratchai Sukphun; Pakkapon Teeraratsakul; Panitchaphon Teeraratsakul; Worrapol Thongsa-nga; Kunlavut Vitidsarn; Tanawat Yimjit	Choi Ji-hoon; Jeon Hyeok-jin; Jo Song-hyun; Kang Min-hyuk; Ki Dong-ju; Kim Jae-hyeon; Kim Won-ho; Park Sang-yong; Seo Seung-jae; Yoo Tae-bin	

== Seeds ==
The top four Asian teams were seeded based on the BWF World Team Rankings published on 8 September 2026.

1. Indonesia (INA) (gold medallist)
2. China (CHN) (silver medallist)
3. Chinese Taipei (TPE) (quarter-finalist)
4. Japan (JPN) (quarter-finalist)

== Results ==
=== Competition Bracket ===
Round of 16
Malaysia	3
Mongolia	0
Thailand	3
Macau	0
Bangladesh	0
India	3
Kazakhstan	0
4	Japan	3
Hong Kong	1
South Korea	3

Quarter-finals
1	Indonesia	3
Malaysia	2
3	Chinese Taipei	1
Thailand	3
India	3
4	Japan	0
South Korea	2
2	China	3

Semi-finals
1	Indonesia	3
Thailand	1
India	1
2	China	3

Gold medal match
1	Indonesia	3
2	China	2

=== Round of 16 ===
Thailand
3
Ichinomiya City Municipal Gymnasium, Court 1
September 21, 2026, 09:30 UTC+9

Macau
0

			1	2	3
1	(Thailand) (Macau)	Kunlavut Vitidsarn; Pui Pang Fong	21; 19	20; 22	21; 10
2	(Thailand) (Macau)	Panitchaphon Teeraratsakul; Pui Chi Chon	21; 8	21; 7
3	(Thailand) (Macau)	Purirat Arree; Leong Iok Chong	21; 14	21; 12
4	(Thailand) (Macau)	Chaloempon Charoenkitamorn / Worrapol Thongsa-nga; Pui Chi Chon / Vong Kok Weng				not played
5	(Thailand) (Macau)	Peeratchai Sukphun / Pakkapon Teeraratsakul; Leong Iok Chong / Pui Pang Fong				not played

Malaysia
3
Ichinomiya City Municipal Gymnasium, Court 2
September 21, 2026, 09:30 UTC+9

Mongolia
0

			1	2	3
1	(Malaysia) (Mongolia)	Leong Jun Hao; Batdavaa Munkhbat	21; 13	21; 12
2	(Malaysia) (Mongolia)	Goh Sze Fei / Nur Izzuddin; Battugs Bayarsaikhan / Bishrelt-Erdene Odbayar	21; 5	21; 5
3	(Malaysia) (Mongolia)	Justin Hoh; Gerelsukh Jargalsaikhan	21; 7	21; 5
4	(Malaysia) (Mongolia)	Aaron Chia / Tee Kai Wun; Dulgunn Khishigchuluun / Enkhbat Olonbayar				not played
5	(Malaysia) (Mongolia)	Eogene Ewe; Usukh-Ireedui Uulensolongo				not played

Hong Kong
1
Ichinomiya City Municipal Gymnasium, Court 3
September 21, 2026, 15:00 UTC+9

South Korea
3

			1	2	3
1	(Hong Kong) (South Korea)	Lee Cheuk Yiu; Yoo Tae-bin	18; 21	16; 21	20; 22
2	(Hong Kong) (South Korea)	Deng Chi Fai / Hung Kuei Chun; Kim Won-ho / Seo Seung-jae	9; 21	10; 21
3	(Hong Kong) (South Korea)	Jason Gunawan; Park Sang-yong	21; 18	21; 17
4	(Hong Kong) (South Korea)	Chan Yin Chak / Lui Chun Wai; Kang Min-hyuk / Ki Dong-ju	21; 18	16; 21	20; 22
5	(Hong Kong) (South Korea)	Ng Ka Long; Choi Ji-hoon				not played

Kazakhstan
0
Ichinomiya City Municipal Gymnasium, Court 4
September 21, 2026, 15:00 UTC+9

Japan
3

			1	2	3
1	(Kazakhstan) (Japan)	Dmitriy Panarin; Koki Watanabe	14; 21	7; 21
2	(Kazakhstan) (Japan)	Makhsut Tajibullayev; Yushi Tanaka	7; 21	9; 21
3	(Kazakhstan) (Japan)	Khaitmurat Kulmatov; Kenta Nishimoto	16; 21	6; 21
4	(Kazakhstan) (Japan)	Dmitriy Panarin / Makhsut Tajibullayev; Kakeru Kumagai / Hiroki Nishi				not played
5	(Kazakhstan) (Japan)	Khaitmurat Kulmatov / Artur Niyazov; Takuro Hoki / Yugo Kobayashi				not played

Bangladesh
0
Ichinomiya City Municipal Gymnasium, Court 5
September 21, 2026, 15:00 UTC+9

India
3

			1	2	3
1	(Bangladesh) (India)	Ayman Ibn Jaman; Lakshya Sen	4; 21	12; 21
2	(Bangladesh) (India)	Gourab Singha; Ayush Shetty	4; 21	13; 21
3	(Bangladesh) (India)	Al-Amin Jumar; Srikanth Kidambi	15; 21	9; 21
4	(Bangladesh) (India)	Ayman Ibn Jaman / Al-Amin Jumar; Hariharan Amsakarunan / Arjun M. R.				not played
5	(Bangladesh) (India)	Al-Amin Jumar / Moajjam Hossain Ohidul; Satwiksairaj Rankireddy / Chirag Shetty				not played

=== Quarter-finals ===
Indonesia
3
Ichinomiya City Municipal Gymnasium, Court 1
September 22, 2026, 15:00 UTC+9

Malaysia
2

			1	2	3
1	(Indonesia) (Malaysia)	Jonatan Christie; Leong Jun Hao	22; 20	12; 21	17; 21
2	(Indonesia) (Malaysia)	Fajar Alfian / Muhammad Shohibul Fikri; Goh Sze Fei / Nur Izzuddin	21; 15	19; 21	21; 10
3	(Indonesia) (Malaysia)	Alwi Farhan; Justin Hoh	21; 19	21; 19
4	(Indonesia) (Malaysia)	Leo Rolly Carnando / Daniel Marthin; Aaron Chia / Tee Kai Wun	21; 17	16; 21	13; 21
5	(Indonesia) (Malaysia)	Zaki Ubaidillah; Eogene Ewe	21; 11	21; 11

India
3
Ichinomiya City Municipal Gymnasium, Court 2
September 22, 2026, 15:00 UTC+9

Japan
0

			1	2	3
1	(India) (Japan)	Lakshya Sen; Kodai Naraoka	11; 21	21; 5	21; 19
2	(India) (Japan)	Satwiksairaj Rankireddy / Chirag Shetty; Takuro Hoki / Yugo Kobayashi	21; 18	24; 22
3	(India) (Japan)	Ayush Shetty; Koki Watanabe	21; 10	21; 19
4	(India) (Japan)	Hariharan Amsakarunan / Arjun M. R. Kakeru Kumagai / Hiroki Nishi				not played
5	(India) (Japan)	Srikanth Kidambi; Yushi Tanaka				not played

South Korea
2
Ichinomiya City Municipal Gymnasium, Court 3
September 22, 2026, 15:00 UTC+9

China
3

			1	2	3
1	(South Korea) (China)	Yoo Tae-bin; Shi Yuqi	21; 13	19; 21	12; 21
2	(South Korea) (China)	Kim Won-ho / Seo Seung-jae; Liang Weikeng / Wang Chang	21; 12	21; 12
3	(South Korea) (China)	Jeon Hyeok-jin; Li Shifeng	12; 21	21; 17	21; 16
4	(South Korea) (China)	Kang Min-hyuk / Ki Dong-ju; He Jiting / Liu Yi	15; 21	21; 14	11; 21
5	(South Korea) (China)	Choi Ji-hoon; Weng Hongyang	17; 21	15; 21

Chinese Taipei
1
Ichinomiya City Municipal Gymnasium, Court 4
September 22, 2026, 15:00 UTC+9

Thailand
3

			1	2	3
1	(Chinese Taipei) (Thailand)	Chou Tien-chen; Kunlavut Vitidsarn	21; 19	16; 21	14; 21
2	(Chinese Taipei) (Thailand)	Lee Jhe-huei / Yang Po-hsuan; Peeratchai Sukphun / Pakkapon Teeraratsakul	21; 16	20; 22	21; 23
3	(Chinese Taipei) (Thailand)	Chi Yu-jen; Panitchaphon Teeraratsakul	15; 21	9; 5		retired
4	(Chinese Taipei) (Thailand)	Liu Kuang-heng / Wang Chi-lin; Chaloempon Charoenkitamorn / Worrapol Thongsa-nga	21; 13	14; 21	14; 21
5	(Chinese Taipei) (Thailand)	Wang Tzu-wei; Puritat Arree				not played

=== Semi-finals ===
Indonesia
3
Ichinomiya City Municipal Gymnasium, Court 2
September 23, 2026, 15:00 UTC+9

Thailand
1

			1	2	3
1	(Indonesia) (Thailand)	Jonatan Christie; Kunlavut Vitidsarn	17; 21	14; 21
2	(Indonesia) (Thailand)	Fajar Alfian / Muhammad Shohibul Fikri; Peeratchai Sukphun / Pakkapon Teeraratsakul	21; 13	21; 19
3	(Indonesia) (Thailand)	Alwi Farhan; Puritat Arree	21; 15	21; 13
4	(Indonesia) (Thailand)	Leo Rolly Carnando / Daniel Marthin; Chaloempon Charoenkitamorn / Worrapol Thongsa-nga	21; 15	21; 13
5	(Indonesia) (Thailand)	Zaki Ubaidillah; Tanawat Yimjit

India
1
Ichinomiya City Municipal Gymnasium, Court 1
September 23, 2026, 15:00 UTC+9

China
3

			1	2	3
1	(India) (China)	Lakshya Sen; Shi Yuqi	16; 21	18; 21
2	(India) (China)	Satwiksairaj Rankireddy / Chirag Shetty; Liang Weikeng / Wang Chang	21; 11	22; 20
3	(India) (China)	Ayush Shetty; Li Shifeng	19; 21	13; 21
4	(India) (China)	Hariharan Amsakarunan / Arjun M.R. He Jiting / Liu Yi	16; 21	21; 17	9; 21
5	(India) (China)	Srikanth Kidambi; Weng Hongyang				not played

=== Gold medal match ===
Indonesia
3
Ichinomiya City Municipal Gymnasium, Court 1
September 24, 2026, 16:00 UTC+9

China
2

			1	2	3
1	(Indonesia) (China)	Jonatan Christie; Shi Yuqi	13; 21	18; 21
2	(Indonesia) (China)	Fajar Alfian / Muhammad Shohibul Fikri; Liang Weikeng / Wang Chang	20; 22	21; 19	14; 21
3	(Indonesia) (China)	Alwi Farhan; Li Shifeng	23; 21	15; 21	21; 16
4	(Indonesia) (China)	Leo Rolly Carnando / Daniel Marthin; He Jiting / Liu Yi	23; 21	21; 10
5	(Indonesia) (China)	Zaki Ubaidillah; Weng Hongyang	23; 21	21; 13

== See also ==
Badminton at the 2026 Asian Games – Women's team
