= Ayush Shetty =

Indian badminton player

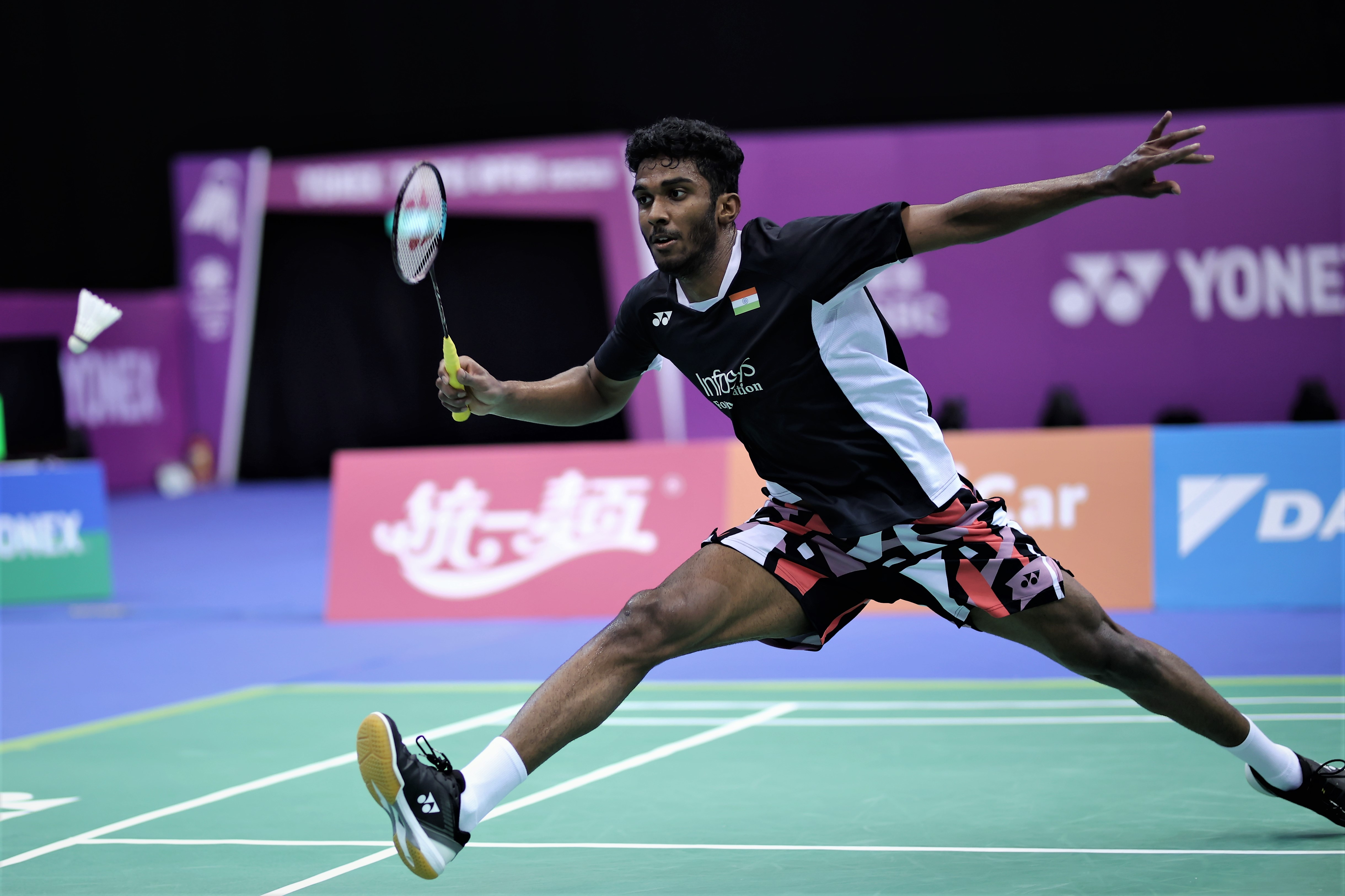
- Shetty at the 2025 Taipei Open

Personal information
- Born: 3 May 2005 (age 21) Karkala, Karnataka, India
- Years active: 2023–present
- Height: 1.95 m (6 ft 5 in)

Sport
- Country: India
- Sport: Badminton
- Handedness: Right
- Coached by: Vimal Kumar; Sagar Chopda

Men's singles
- Career record: 91 wins, 52 losses
- Highest ranking: 18 (14 April 2026)
- Current ranking: 22 (10 November 2026)
- BWF profile
Medal record
Men's badminton
Representing India
Thomas Cup
Bronze medal – third place	2026 Horsens	Men's team
Asian Games
Bronze medal – third place	2026 Aichi–Nagoya	Men's team
Asian Championships
Silver medal – second place	2026 Ningbo	Men's singles
World Junior Championships
Bronze medal – third place	2023 Spokane	Boys' singles

Ayush Shetty (born 3 May 2005) is an Indian badminton player. He won the bronze medal at the 2023 World Junior Championships in the boys' singles event. He won a silver medal at the 2026 Asian Championships.

At the 2026 Badminton Asia Championships in Ningbo, China, Shetty became the first Indian to win a men's singles silver medal at the tournament and the youngest Indian male shuttler to win a medal at the continental championships, at age 20.

== Achievements ==
=== Asian Championships ===
Men's singles
Year	Venue	Opponent	Score	Result	Ref.
2026	Ningbo Olympic Sports Center Gymnasium; Ningbo, China	(China) Shi Yuqi	8–21, 10–21	Silver	

=== World Junior Championships ===
Boys' singles
Year	Venue	Opponent	Score	Result
2023	The Podium; Spokane, United States	(Indonesia) Alwi Farhan	18–21, 15–21	Bronze

=== World Tour (1 title, 1 runner-up) ===
The BWF World Tour was announced on 19 March 2017 and implemented in 2018. It is a series of elite badminton tournaments sanctioned by the Badminton World Federation. It is divided into levels of World Tour Finals, Super 1000, Super 750, Super 500, Super 300, and the Tour Super 100.

Men's singles
Year	Tournament	Level	Opponent	Score	Result
2023	Odisha Masters	Super 100	(India) Sathish Karunakaran	18–21, 21–19, 14–21	(silver) Runner-up
2025	U.S. Open	Super 300	(Canada) Brian Yang	21–18, 21–13	(gold) Winner

=== BWF International (2 runners-up) ===
Men's singles
Year	Tournament	Opponent	Score	Result
2023	Bahrain International	(China) Wang Zhengxing	19–21, 14–21	(silver) Runner-up
2024	Dutch Open	(Denmark) Mads Christophersen	10–21, 9–21	(silver) Runner-up

BWF International Challenge tournament
BWF International Series tournament
BWF Future Series tournament

=== Junior International (1 title) ===
Boys' singles
Year	Tournament	Opponent	Score	Result
2021	Denmark Junior International	(Indonesia) Yohanes Saut Marcellyno	21–17, 21–16	(gold) Winner

BWF Junior International Grand Prix tournament
BWF Junior International Challenge tournament
BWF Junior International Series tournament
BWF Junior Future Series tournament

== Performance timeline ==
Key

W	Won	F	Finalist	SF	Semi-finalist
QF	Quarter-finalist	#R	Rounds 4, 3, 2, 1	RR	Round-robin stage
Q#	Qualification round	A	Absent	w/d	Withdrew
G	Gold	S	Silver	B	Bronze
NH	Not held	N/A	Not applicable	DNQ	Did not qualify

=== Tournaments ===
Junior events

Tournament	2022	2023	Ref
Individual
World Championships	2R	B	
Asian Championships	NH	3R	
Team
World Championships	13th	QF	
Asian Championships	NH	QF	

Senior events

Tournament	2026	Ref
Individual
Asian Championships	S	
Asian Games	3R	
World Championships	3R	
Team
Thomas Cup	B	
Asian Games	B	

=== World Tour ===
Tournament	World Tour				Best	Ref
Tournament	2023	2024	2025	2026	Best	Ref
Malaysia Open	A			2R	2R ('26)	
India Open	A			1R	1R ('26)	
Indonesia Masters	A		1R	1R	1R ('25, '26)	
Thailand Masters	A		1R	A	1R ('25)	
German Open	A		1R	A	1R ('25)	
All England Open	A			1R	1R ('26)	
Ruichang China Masters	A	QF	A		QF ('24)	
Swiss Open	A		1R	1R	1R ('25, '26)	
Orléans Masters	A		SF	2R	SF ('25)	
Baoji China Masters	NA	SF	A		SF ('24)	
Thailand Open	A	Q2	Q2	1R	1R ('26)	
Malaysia Masters	A	Q2	2R	A	2R ('25)	
Singapore Open	A			1R	1R ('26)	
Indonesia Open	A			2R	2R ('26)	
Australian Open	A			w/d		
Macau Open	NH	2R	2R	A	2R ('24, '25)	
U.S. Open	A	1R	W	A	W ('25)	
Canada Open	A	1R	1R	A	1R ('24, '25)	
Japan Open	A			1R	1R ('26)	
China Open	A			2R	2R ('26)	
Taipei Open	A		SF	A	SF ('25)	
China Masters	A		1R	A	1R ('25)	
Indonesia Masters Super 100	A	w/d	A			
Arctic Open	A		1R	A	1R ('25)	
Denmark Open	A		1R	1R	1R ('25, '26)	
French Open	A		1R	2R	2R ('26)	
Hylo Open	A	SF	QF	w/d	SF ('24)	
Korea Open	A		1R		1R ('25)	
Japan Masters	A		1R		1R ('25)	
Hong Kong Open	A		QF		QF ('25)	
Syed Modi International	A	QF	w/d		QF ('24)	
Guwahati Masters	3R	QF	A		QF ('24)	
Odisha Masters	F	QF	A		F ('23)	
Year-end ranking	111	48	32		18	

== Record against opponents ==
Record against Year-end Finals finalists, World Championships semi-finalists, and Olympic quarter-finalists. Accurate as of 11 April 2026.

Player	Matches	Win	Lost	Diff.
(Canada) Victor Lai	1	1	0	+1
(China) Shi Yuqi	4	1	3	-2
(Chinese Taipei) Chou Tien-chen	3	1	2	-1
(France) Christo Popov	2	0	2	-2
(India) Srikanth Kidambi	3	2	1	+1
(India) Lakshya Sen	3	0	3	-3
(Japan) Kodai Naraoka	3	2	1	+1
(Malaysia) Lee Zii Jia	1	1	0	+1
(Singapore) Loh Kean Yew	2	2	0	+2
(Thailand) Kunlavut Vitidsarn	2	1	1	0

== See also ==
- India national badminton team
- Badminton in India
