= 2023 Guwahati Masters =

Badminton tournament in Guwahati, India

Tournament details
- Dates: 5–10 December
- Edition: 1st
- Level: Super 100
- Total prize money: US$100,000
- Venue: Sarju Sarai Indoor Sports Complex
- Location: Guwahati, Assam, India

Champions
- Men's singles: (Indonesia) Yohanes Saut Marcellyno
- Women's singles: (Thailand) Lalinrat Chaiwan
- Men's doubles: (Malaysia) Choong Hon Jian (Malaysia) Muhammad Haikal
- Women's doubles: (India) Tanisha Crasto (India) Ashwini Ponnappa
- Mixed doubles: (Singapore) Terry Hee (Singapore) Jessica Tan

The 2023 Guwahati Masters, known as Yonex-Sunrise Guwahati Masters 2023 for sponsorship reasons, was a badminton tournament which took place at the Sarju Sarai Indoor Sports Complex, Guwahati, Assam, India from 5 to 10 December 2023. It had a total prize pool of US$100,000.

== Tournament ==
The 2023 Guwahati Masters was the thirty-fifth tournament of the 2023 BWF World Tour and was also the inaugural edition of the Guwahati Masters championships. This tournament was organized by the Badminton Association of India with sanction from the BWF.

=== Venue ===
This international tournament was held at Sarju Sarai Indoor Sports Complex in Guwahati, Assam, India.

=== Point distribution ===
Below is the point distribution table for each phase of the tournament based on the BWF points system for the BWF Tour Super 100 event.

Winner	Runner-up	3/4	5/8	9/16	17/32	33/64	65/128	129/256
5,500	4,680	3,850	3,030	2,110	1,290	510	240	100

=== Prize pool ===
The total prize money was US$100,000 with the distribution of the prize money in accordance with BWF regulations.

Event	Winner	Finalist	Semi-finals	Quarter-finals	Last 16
Singles	$7,500	$3,800	$1,450	$600	$350
Doubles	$7,900	$3,800	$1,400	$725	$375

== Men's singles ==
=== Seeds ===
1. (Thailand) Kantaphon Wangcharoen (second round)
2. (Chinese Taipei) Lee Chia-hao (second round)
3. (India) Kiran George (second round)
4. (Chinese Taipei) Chi Yu-jen (second round)
5. (Denmark) Mads Christophersen (third round)
6. (France) Alex Lanier (quarter-finals)
7. (India) Mithun Manjunath (third round)
8. (Singapore) Jason Teh (quarter-finals)

=== Finals ===
Semi-finals
(Indonesia) Yohanes Saut Marcellyno	21	21
(Malaysia) Cheam June Wei	10	19
(Indonesia) Alvi Wijaya Chairullah	21	11
(Malaysia) Justin Hoh	12	2^{r}

Final
(Indonesia) Yohanes Saut Marcellyno	21	21
(Indonesia) Alvi Wijaya Chairullah	12	17

=== Top half ===
==== Section 1 ====
First round
(India) A Yeligar	21	11	7
(Indonesia) Y S Marcellyno	14	21	21
Q4	(India) A Shetty	21	21
(India) A Hari	16	11
Q5	(India) B Raghav	21	16	16
PFQ	(India) T Mannepalli	19	21	21
(India) S Gupta	21	21
(Mauritius) J Paul	15	9

Second round
1	(Thailand) K Wangcharoen	20	18
(Indonesia) Y S Marcellyno	22	21
PFQ	(Indonesia) J C Alexander	12	21	17
Q4	(India) A Shetty	21	14	21
8	(Singapore) J Teh	21	21
PFQ	(India) T Mannepalli	11	14
(India) M Maisnam	21	14	21
(India) S Gupta	19	21	17

Third round
(Indonesia) Y S Marcellyno	19	21	23
Q4	(India) A Shetty	21	16	21
8	(Singapore) J Teh	21	21
(India) M Maisnam	12	13

Quarter-finals
(Indonesia) Y S Marcellyno	20	21	21
8	(Singapore) J Teh	22	18	15

==== Section 2 ====
First round
(India) A Mishra	21	9	12
(Malaysia) Cheam J W	12	21	21
Q6	(India) S Dayanand	15	21	21
(India) H Aggarwal	21	13	15
(India) C Sen	21	17	21
(India) Ravi	9	21	10
(Canada) B. R. Sankeerth	21	15	11
Q7	(India) P Katta	17	21	21

Second round
4	(Chinese Taipei) Chi Y-j	19	21	13
(Malaysia) Cheam J W	21	7	21
(India) S Dey	21	23	21
Q6	(India) S Dayanand	17	25	17
5	(Denmark) M Christophersen	21	21
(India) C Sen	15	9
(India) K Kumar	21	21
Q7	(India) P Katta	12	17

Third round
(Malaysia) Cheam J W	21	21
(India) S Dey	15	15
5	(Denmark) M Christophersen	18	15
(India) K Kumar	21	21

Quarter-finals
(Malaysia) Cheam J W	14	21	21
(India) K Kumar	21	12	9

=== Bottom half ===
==== Section 3 ====
First round
Q3	(India) T R Katam	16	18
(India) B. Sai Praneeth	21	21
(India) H Dani	12	12
Q1	(India) B Somasundara	21	21
(Indonesia) A W Chairullah	21	21
(United States) K A Walter	14	7
(India) S Dalal	9	10
(India) S Verma	21	21

Second round
(India) B. Sai Praneeth	21	17	7
(Chinese Taipei) Kuo K-l	14	21	21
Q1	(India) B Somasundara	21	15	13
6	(France) A Lanier	14	21	21
(Indonesia) A W Chairullah	21	21
(India) R Mariswamy	14	17
(India) S Verma	21	21
3	(India) K George	13	13

Third round
(Chinese Taipei) Kuo K-l	21	10	18
6	(France) A Lanier	12	21	21
(Indonesia) A W Chairullah	24	18	23
(India) S Verma	22	21	21

Quarter-finals
6	(France) A Lanier	21	11	17
(Indonesia) A W Chairullah	19	21	21

==== Section 4 ====
First round
(Malaysia) J Hoh	21	21
(India) R Sanjeevi	16	9
PFQ	(India) V Vasudevan
PFQ	(India) H Gowda	w	/	o
(India) S Karunakaran	21	14	11
(Malaysia) Soong J V	7	21	21
(Indonesia) A Farhan	21	21
(Chinese Taipei) Yang Y	10	16

Second round
(Malaysia) J Hoh	18	21	21
Q2	(India) V Kapur	21	16	9
PFQ	(India) H Gowda	14	10
7	(India) M Manjunath	21	21
(Malaysia) Soong J V	18	14
Q8	(India) A Saini	21	21
(Indonesia) A Farhan	21	21
2	(Chinese Taipei) Lee C-h	8	12

Third round
(Malaysia) J Hoh	21	21
7	(India) M Manjunath	19	19
Q8	(India) A Saini	15	14
(Indonesia) A Farhan	21	21

Quarter-finals
(Malaysia) J Hoh	17	22	21
(Indonesia) A Farhan	21	20	17

== Women's singles ==
=== Seeds ===
1. (Thailand) Supanida Katethong (withdrew)
2. (Chinese Taipei) Hsu Wen-chi (semi-finals)
3. (Chinese Taipei) Sung Shuo-yun (quarter-finals)
4. (Denmark) Line Christophersen (final)
5. (India) Aakarshi Kashyap (second round)
6. (United States) Lauren Lam (withdrew)
7. (Chinese Taipei) Lin Hsiang-ti (first round)
8. (Indonesia) Ester Nurumi Tri Wardoyo (second round)

=== Finals ===
Semi-finals
(India) Malvika Bansod	12	14
(Thailand) Lalinrat Chaiwan	21	21
4	(Denmark) Line Christophersen	21	12	21
2	(Chinese Taipei) Hsu Wen-chi	15	21	17

Final
(Thailand) Lalinrat Chaiwan	21	17	21
4	(Denmark) Line Christophersen	14	21	16

=== Top half ===
==== Section 1 ====
First round
PFQ	(India) I Sharma	17	21	21
(Malaysia) Wong L C	21	17	12
(Malaysia) Letshanaa K	15
Q1	(Poland) W Dabczynska	2^{r}
PFQ	(Uganda) F Mohamed Rafi	10	10
(India) M Bansod	21	21
(Malaysia) Kisona S	16	21	16
(India) T Hemanth	21	15	21

Second round
PFQ	(India) I Sharma	15	21	18
(Malaysia) Letshanaa K	21	11	21
(India) M Bansod	21	21
(India) T Hemanth	13	17

Quarter-finals
(Malaysia) Letshanaa K	12	16
(India) M Bansod	21	21

==== Section 2 ====
First round
3	(Chinese Taipei) Sung S-y	21	21
Q4	(India) I Baruah	13	10
(Indonesia) S Widjaja	16	19
(India) U Hooda	21	21
8	(Indonesia) E N T Wardoyo	21	21
(Australia) T Ho	12	13
(India) A Chaliha	17	20
(Thailand) L Chaiwan	21	22

Second round
3	(Chinese Taipei) Sung S-y	11	21	21
(India) U Hooda	21	15	19
8	(Indonesia) E N T Wardoyo	18	5^{r}
(Thailand) L Chaiwan	21	8

Quarter-finals
3	(Chinese Taipei) Sung S-y	10	21	16
(Thailand) L Chaiwan	21	16	21

=== Bottom half ===
==== Section 3 ====
First round
Q3	(Chinese Taipei) Yu C-h	13	11
(Chinese Taipei) Huang C-p	21	21
(Chinese Taipei) Chiu P-c	26	13	21
7	(Chinese Taipei) Lin H-t	24	21	15
(India) A Upadhyaya	21	21
(Indonesia) B Prasista	11	16
(Denmark) J D Jakobsen	23	18	13
4	(Denmark) L Christophersen	21	21	21

Second round
(Chinese Taipei) Huang C-p	12	15
(Chinese Taipei) Chiu P-c	21	21
(India) A Upadhyaya	10	11
4	(Denmark) L Christophersen	21	21

Quarter-finals
(Chinese Taipei) Chiu P-c	19	11
4	(Denmark) L Christophersen	21	21

==== Section 4 ====
First round
Q2	(Indonesia) T Farahnailah	21	18	20
(Chinese Taipei) Lin S-y	18	21	22
(Denmark) A Schulz	21	17	20
5	(India) A Kashyap	15	21	22
(India) R Gadde	12	11
(India) S Farooqui	21	21
(India) T Mir	21	13	17
2	(Chinese Taipei) Hsu W-c	11	21	21

Second round
(Chinese Taipei) Lin S-y	21	12	22
5	(India) A Kashyap	17	21	20
(India) S Farooqui	15	21	13
2	(Chinese Taipei) Hsu W-c	21	18	21

Quarter-finals
(Chinese Taipei) Lin S-y	13	13
2	(Chinese Taipei) Hsu W-c	21	21

== Men's doubles ==
=== Seeds ===
1. (Denmark) Daniel Lundgaard / Mads Vestergaard (second round)
2. (Malaysia) Low Hang Yee / Ng Eng Cheong (first round)
3. (Thailand) Pharanyu Kaosamaang / Worrapol Thongsa-nga (second round)
4. (Chinese Taipei) Wei Chun-wei / Wu Guan-xun (second round)
5. (Indonesia) Rayhan Fadillah / Marcus Fernaldi Gideon (quarter-finals)
6. (India) Dhruv Kapila / Vishnuvardhan Goud Panjala (quarter-finals)
7. (Malaysia) Junaidi Arif / Yap Roy King (withdrew)
8. (India) Krishna Prasad Garaga / K. Sai Pratheek (second round)

=== Finals ===
Semi-finals
(Malaysia) Boon Xin Yuan (Malaysia) Goh V Shem	18	17
(Malaysia) Choong Hon Jian (Malaysia) Muhammad Haikal	21	21
(India) Hariharan Amsakarunan (India) Ruban Kumar	10	19
(Chinese Taipei) Lin Bing-wei (Chinese Taipei) Su Ching-heng	21	21

Final
(Malaysia) Choong Hon Jian (Malaysia) Muhammad Haikal	21	23
(Chinese Taipei) Lin Bing-wei (Chinese Taipei) Su Ching-heng	17	21

=== Top half ===
==== Section 1 ====
First round
1	(Denmark) D Lundgaard (Denmark) M Vestergaard	20	21	21
Q2	(India) Vip Kuvale (India) Vir Kuvale	22	15	13
(India) S S Dhanraj (India) S P Karri	11	11
(Malaysia) Lwi S H (Malaysia) J Wong	21	21
8	(India) K P Garaga (India) K S Pratheek	21	21
(Iran) M M Mirshekari (Iran) S Sangtarash	11	13
(Malaysia) Boon X Y (Malaysia) Goh V S	22	21	21
(India) M S Khwairakpam (India) D S Konthoujam	24	10	9

Second round
1	(Denmark) D Lundgaard (Denmark) M Vestergaard	21	17	19
(Malaysia) Lwi S H (Malaysia) J Wong	16	21	21
8	(India) K P Garaga (India) K S Pratheek	21	15	19
(Malaysia) Boon X Y (Malaysia) Goh V S	16	21	21

Quarter-finals
(Malaysia) Lwi S H (Malaysia) J Wong	21	16	20
(Malaysia) Boon X Y (Malaysia) Goh V S	18	21	22

==== Section 2 ====
First round
4	(Chinese Taipei) Wei C-w (Chinese Taipei) Wu G-x	21	21
(India) R Swarnkar (India) G Vittalji	6	6
(United Arab Emirates) De Ayyappan (United Arab Emirates) Dh Ayyappan	15	16
(India) A R Doddavarapu (India) V H V R Veeramreddy	21	21
PFQ	(India) D Rambhiya (India) A Shetty	4	16
(Malaysia) Choong H J (Malaysia) M Haikal	21	21
(Denmark) W K Boe (Denmark) C F Kjær	21	19	21
(India) B S Reddy (India) A Surya	17	21	16

Second round
4	(Chinese Taipei) Wei C-w (Chinese Taipei) Wu G-x	22	21
(India) A R Doddavarapu (India) V H V R Veeramreddy	24	23
(Malaysia) Choong H J (Malaysia) M Haikal	21	21
(Denmark) W K Boe (Denmark) C F Kjær	17	10

Quarter-finals
(India) A R Doddavarapu (India) V H V R Veeramreddy	9	14
(Malaysia) Choong H J (Malaysia) M Haikal	21	21

=== Bottom half ===
==== Section 3 ====
First round
(India) V Annadurai (India) N P Eswaramoorthy	10	10
Q4	(India) D Rawat (India) C Sen	21	21
Q3	(India) Nithin H. V. (India) C Joshi	16	14
6	(India) D Kapila (India) V G Panjala	21	21
(India) H Amsakarunan (India) R Kumar	21	22
(India) S Gajendran (India) M Kathiravan	13	20
(India) A Mohammad (India) S Tamboli	16	19
3	(Thailand) P Kaosamaang (Thailand) W Thongsa-nga	21	21

Second round
(India) D Rawat (India) C Sen	8	17
6	(India) D Kapila (India) V G Panjala	21	21
(India) H Amsakarunan (India) R Kumar	16	22	21
(Thailand) P Kaosamaang (Thailand) W Thongsa-nga	21	20	16

Quarter-finals
6	(India) D Kapila (India) V G Panjala	18	21	18
(India) H Amsakarunan (India) R Kumar	21	9	21

==== Section 4 ====
First round
(India) P Raj (India) H N B Thandarangi	15	15
(Malaysia) Lau Y S (Malaysia) Lee Y B	21	21
(Chinese Taipei) Chiang C-w (Chinese Taipei) Wu H-y	8	19
5	(Indonesia) R Fadillah (Indonesia) M F Gideon	21	21
Q1	(India) A Buragohain (India) R Buragohain	18	18
(India) P. S. Ravikrishna (India) S P Udayakumar	21	21
(Chinese Taipei) Lin B-w (Chinese Taipei) Su C-h	21	9	21
2	(Malaysia) Low H Y (Malaysia) Ng E C	13	21	16

Second round
(Malaysia) Lau Y S (Malaysia) Lee Y B	13	18
5	(Indonesia) R Fadillah (Indonesia) M F Gideon	21	21
(India) P. S. Ravikrishna (India) S P Udayakumar	12	21	11
(Chinese Taipei) Lin B-w (Chinese Taipei) Su C-h	21	15	21

Quarter-finals
5	(Indonesia) R Fadillah (Indonesia) M F Gideon	20	15
(Chinese Taipei) Lin B-w (Chinese Taipei) Su C-h	22	21

== Women's doubles ==
=== Seeds ===
1. (India) Treesa Jolly / Gayatri Gopichand (withdrew)
2. (India) Tanisha Crasto / Ashwini Ponnappa (champions)
3. (Netherlands) Debora Jille / Cheryl Seinen (semi-finals)
4. (Indonesia) Meilysa Trias Puspita Sari / Rachel Allessya Rose (quarter-finals)
5. (United States) Paula Lynn Cao Hok / Lauren Lam (withdrew)
6. (Australia) Setyana Mapasa / Angela Yu (semi-finals)
7. (India) Ashwini Bhat / Shikha Gautam (first round)
8. (Indonesia) Jesita Putri Miantoro / Febi Setianingrum (quarter-finals)

=== Finals ===
Semi-finals
(Chinese Taipei) Sung Shuo-yun (Chinese Taipei) Yu Chien-hui	21	21
6	(Australia) Setyana Mapasa (Australia) Angela Yu	15	19
3	(Netherlands) Debora Jille (Netherlands) Cheryl Seinen	12	12
2	(India) Tanisha Crasto (India) Ashwini Ponnappa	21	21

Final
(Chinese Taipei) Sung Shuo-yun (Chinese Taipei) Yu Chien-hui	13	19
2	(India) Tanisha Crasto (India) Ashwini Ponnappa	21	21

=== Top half ===
==== Section 1 ====
First round
PFQ	(India) A Kandula (India) V Khadkekar	11	11
(Malaysia) Go P K (Malaysia) Low Y Y	21	21
(India) A Gahlawat (India) S Gahlawat	17	17
Q3	(India) I Malik (India) T Malik	21	21
7	(India) A Bhat (India) S Gautam	13	13
(Chinese Taipei) Sung S-y (Chinese Taipei) Yu C-h	21	21
(India) S Gupta (India) S Singh	11	18
(India) S Singhi (India) R Thaker	21	21

Second round
(Malaysia) Go P K (Malaysia) Low Y Y	21	21
Q3	(India) I Malik (India) T Malik	14	9
(Chinese Taipei) Sung S-y (Chinese Taipei) Yu C-h	21	21
(India) S Singhi (India) R Thaker	4	11

Quarter-finals
(Malaysia) Go P K (Malaysia) Low Y Y	6	15
(Chinese Taipei) Sung S-y (Chinese Taipei) Yu C-h	21	21

==== Section 2 ====
First round
4	(Indonesia) M T Puspita Sari (Indonesia) R A Rose	21	21
(India) A B Radhakrishnan (India) V Viswanath Sri	9	11
(India) P Konjengbam (India) S Mishra	21	21
(India) Nik Rapria (India) Nis Rapria	11	8
6	(Australia) S Mapasa (Australia) A Yu	21	21
(India) K Gupta (India) D Singh	13	13
PFQ	(India) D Nandakumar (India) R K Toor	21	21
Q1	(India) P Larki (India) Y Laa	9	13

Second round
4	(Indonesia) M T Puspita Sari (Indonesia) R A Rose	21	23	21
(India) P Konjengbam (India) S Mishra	7	25	13
6	(Australia) S Mapasa (Australia) A Yu	19	21	21
PFQ	(India) D Nandakumar (India) R K Toor	21	10	8

Quarter-finals
4	(Indonesia) M T Puspita Sari (Indonesia) R A Rose	13	21	14
6	(Australia) S Mapasa (Australia) A Yu	21	16	21

=== Bottom half ===
==== Section 3 ====
First round
PFQ	(India) N Manglam (India) I Waldia	11	12
(India) R Panda (India) S Panda	21	21
Q2	(India) M Nayak (India) A Warang	12	14
PFQ	(India) G R Jaiswal (India) S Sikkandar	21	21
(India) R Sharma (India) T Sharma	21	21
Q4	(India) Keerthika C. H. (India) D R Balasubramanian	14	19
(India) D Bhonsle (India) N Joseph	13	12
3	(Netherlands) D Jille (Netherlands) C Seinen	21	21

Second round
(India) R Panda (India) S Panda	21	21
PFQ	(India) G R Jaiswal (India) S Sikkandar	14	13
(India) R Sharma (India) T Sharma	20	21	16
3	(Netherlands) D Jille (Netherlands) C Seinen	22	18	21

Quarter-finals
(India) R Panda (India) S Panda	11	20
3	(Netherlands) D Jille (Netherlands) C Seinen	21	22

==== Section 4 ====
First round
(Chinese Taipei) N G Chan (Chinese Taipei) Yang C-y	21	19	21
(Chinese Taipei) Wang S-m (Chinese Taipei) Wu M-c	19	21	13
(India) S S S Lakkamraju (India) A A Pai	15	16
8	(Indonesia) J P Miantoro (Indonesia) F Setianingrum	21	21
(Uganda) H Kobugabe (Uganda) G Mbabazi	13	12
(India) P Arora (India) U Hooda	21	21
(India) G Nellihankalu Shivashankar (India) D Sankar	17	10
2	(India) T Crasto (India) A Ponnappa	21	21

Second round
(Chinese Taipei) N G Chan (Chinese Taipei) Yang C-y	12	10
8	(Indonesia) J P Miantoro (Indonesia) F Setianingrum	21	21
(India) P Arora (India) U Hooda	13	8
2	(India) T Crasto (India) A Ponnappa	21	21

Quarter-finals
8	(Indonesia) J P Miantoro (Indonesia) F Setianingrum	20	16
2	(India) T Crasto (India) A Ponnappa	22	21

== Mixed doubles ==
=== Seeds ===
1. (Indonesia) Dejan Ferdinansyah / Gloria Emanuelle Widjaja (quarter-finals)
2. (Singapore) Terry Hee / Jessica Tan (champions)
3. (England) Marcus Ellis / Lauren Smith (withdrew)
4. (Germany) Mark Lamsfuß / Isabel Lohau (withdrew)
5. (Thailand) Ruttanapak Oupthong / Jhenicha Sudjaipraparat (second round)
6. (Denmark) Mads Vestergaard / Christine Busch (final)
7. (Indonesia) Adnan Maulana / Nita Violina Marwah (second round)
8. (Malaysia) Chan Peng Soon / Cheah Yee See (quarter-finals)

=== Finals ===
Semi-finals
6	(Denmark) Mads Vestergaard (Denmark) Christine Busch	21	12	21
(Malaysia) Choong Hon Jian (Malaysia) Go Pei Kee	16	21	7
(India) Dhruv Kapila (India) Tanisha Crasto	18	15
2	(Singapore) Terry Hee (Singapore) Jessica Tan	21	21

Final
6	(Denmark) Mads Vestergaard (Denmark) Christine Busch	19	11
2	(Singapore) Terry Hee (Singapore) Jessica Tan	21	21

=== Top half ===
==== Section 1 ====
First round
1	(Indonesia) D Ferdinansyah (Indonesia) G E Widjaja	21	21
(India) Nithin H. V. (India) R K Toor	10	10
(Australia) K Choo (Australia) G Somerville	21	21
(India) V G Prasad (India) J Dewangan	9	13
6	(Denmark) M Vestergaard (Denmark) C Busch	21	14	21
(Indonesia) J Hidayatullah (Indonesia) A S P Pranata	18	21	19
(India) S Karunakaran (India) A Variyath	19	21	15
Q2	(India) D S Konthoujam (India) P Konjengbam	21	19	21

Second round
1	(Indonesia) D Ferdinansyah (Indonesia) G E Widjaja	21	21
(Australia) K Choo (Australia) G Somerville	19	17
6	(Denmark) M Vestergaard (Denmark) C Busch	21	21
Q2	(India) D S Konthoujam (India) P Konjengbam	19	3

Quarter-finals
1	(Indonesia) D Ferdinansyah (Indonesia) G E Widjaja	18	12
6	(Denmark) M Vestergaard (Denmark) C Busch	21	21

==== Section 2 ====
First round
PFQ	(Indonesia) R Ramanda (Indonesia) I C S Jamil	22	15	16
(India) B S Reddy (India) N S Reddy	20	21	21
(India) M S Khwairakpam (India) A A Pai	7	13
(Malaysia) Choong H J (Malaysia) Go P K	21	21
8	(Malaysia) Chan P S (Malaysia) Cheah Y S	21	21
Q1	(India) Bharathsanjai S. (India) R Ganesh	16	15
(Malaysia) Lim T J (Malaysia) D Siow	18	18
(Chinese Taipei) Lin B-w (Chinese Taipei) Wang S-m	21	21

Second round
(India) B S Reddy (India) N S Reddy	21	19	17
(Malaysia) Choong H J (Malaysia) Go P K	13	21	21
8	(Malaysia) Chan P S (Malaysia) Cheah Y S	21	21
(Chinese Taipei) Lin B-w (Chinese Taipei) Wang S-m	17	13

Quarter-finals
(Malaysia) Choong H J (Malaysia) Go P K	21	21
8	(Malaysia) Chan P S (Malaysia) Cheah Y S	18	13

=== Bottom half ===
==== Section 3 ====
First round
(Indonesia) A Syahnawi (Indonesia) W O Kandow	w	/	o
(United Arab Emirates) Kuswanto (United Arab Emirates) S S Parol
(India) C Joshi (India) K Gupta	13	15
7	(Indonesia) A Maulana (Indonesia) N V Marwah	21	21
7	(Chinese Taipei) Wei C-w (Chinese Taipei) N G Chan	21	21	16
(India) D Kapila (India) T Crasto	23	16	21
(Chinese Taipei) Wu H-y (Chinese Taipei) Yang C-y	21	21
PFQ	(India) D Rambhiya (India) A Warang	16	14

Second round
(Indonesia) A Syahnawi (Indonesia) W O Kandow	21	21
7	(Indonesia) A Maulana (Indonesia) N V Marwah	14	16
(India) D Kapila (India) T Crasto	22	21
(Chinese Taipei) Wu H-y (Chinese Taipei) Yang C-y	20	10

Quarter-finals
(Indonesia) A Syahnawi (Indonesia) W O Kandow	16	17
(India) D Kapila (India) T Crasto	21	21

==== Section 4 ====
First round
Q3	(India) S R Kanapuram (India) V Khadkekar	10	19
Q4	(India) A Surya (India) A Pramuthesh	21	21
(Malaysia) O Ting (Malaysia) Gan J E	16	17
(Thailand) R Oupthong (Thailand) J Sudjaipraparat	21	21
(India) T Kona (India) S K P Kudaravalli	6	8
(Malaysia) Hoo P R (Malaysia) Cheng S Y	21	21
(India) R Kapoor (India) A Ponnappa	12	14
2	(Singapore) T Hee (Singapore) J Tan	21	21

Second round
Q4	(India) A Surya (India) A Pramuthesh	w	/	o
(Thailand) R Oupthong (Thailand) J Sudjaipraparat
(Malaysia) Hoo P R (Malaysia) Cheng S Y	21	18	14
2	(Singapore) T Hee (Singapore) J Tan	18	21	21

Quarter-finals
Q4	(India) A Surya (India) A Pramuthesh	10	10
2	(Singapore) T Hee (Singapore) J Tan	21	21

Preceded by 2023 Syed Modi International	BWF World Tour; 2023 BWF season	Succeeded by 2023 Odisha Masters; 2023 BWF World Tour Finals
