= 2023 BWF World Junior Championships – Boys' singles =

2023 BWF World Junior Championships – boys' singles
Tournament details
- Dates: 2 October 2023 – 8 October 2023
- Edition: 23rd
- Level: International
- Venue: The Podium
- Location: Spokane, United States

The boys' singles of the tournament 2023 BWF World Junior Championships was an individual badminton tournament to crowned the best boys' singles under 19 player across the BWF associate members around the world. Players will compete to win the Eye Level Cup presented by the former BWF President and chairman of the World Youth Culture Foundation, Kang Young Joong. The tournament was held from 2 to 8 October 2023 in the Podium, Spokane, United States. The defending champion was Kuo Kuan-lin from Chinese Taipei, but he was not eligible to participate this year.

== Seeds ==
1. (France) Alex Lanier (semi-finals)
2. (Malaysia) Eogene Ewe (second round)
3. (China) Hu Zhean (final)
4. (Indonesia) Alwi Farhan (champion)
5. (United Arab Emirates) Bharath Latheesh (third round)
6. (China) Wang Zijun (quarter-finals)
7. (Japan) Yudai Okimoto (quarter-finals)
8. (Singapore) Marcus Lau (second round)

9. (Thailand) Patcharakit Apiratchataset (fourth round)
10. (Thailand) Nachakorn Pusri (third round)
11. (Malaysia) Muhammad Faiq (quarter-finals)
12. (Belgium) Baptiste Rolin (second round)
13. (United Arab Emirates) Dev Vishnu (third round)
14. (United States) Garret Tan (second round)
15. (Netherlands) Noah Haase (third round)
16. (Thailand) Wongsup Wongsup-in (fourth round)

== Draw ==
=== Finals ===
Quarter-finals
1	(France) Alex Lanier	21	21
(China) Zhang Ning	13	15
3	(China) Hu Zhean	21	16	21
11	(Malaysia) Muhammad Faiq	10	21	2
6	(China) Wang Zijun	19	18
4	(Indonesia) Alwi Farhan	21	21
7	(Japan) Yudai Okimoto	16	17
(India) Ayush Shetty	21	21

Semi-finals
1	(France) Alex Lanier	20	20
3	(China) Hu Zhean	22	22
4	(Indonesia) Alwi Farhan	21	21
(India) Ayush Shetty	18	15

Final
3	(China) Hu Zhean	19	21	14
4	(Indonesia) Alwi Farhan	21	19	21
