= Badminton at the 2025 SEA Games – Individual event =

Tournament details
- Dates: 11–14 December 2025
- Venue: Gymnasium 4, Thammasat University Rangsit Campus
- Location: Pathum Thani, Thailand

Champions
- Men's singles: (Indonesia) Alwi Farhan
- Women's singles: (Thailand) Ratchanok Intanon
- Men's doubles: (Indonesia) Sabar Karyaman Gutama (Indonesia) Muhammad Reza Pahlevi Isfahani
- Women's doubles: (Malaysia) Pearly Tan (Malaysia) Thinaah Muralitharan
- Mixed doubles: (Thailand) Ruttanapak Oupthong (Thailand) Jhenicha Sudjaipraparat

The individual events for badminton at the 2025 SEA Games were held from 11 to 14 December 2025 at the Gymnasium 4, Thammasat University Rangsit Campus, Pathum Thani, Thailand.

== Schedule ==
All times are Indochina Time (UTC+07:00)

| Date | Time | Event |
|---|---|---|
| Thursday, 11 December | 10:00 | First round |
| Friday, 12 December | 10:00 | Quarterfinals |
| Saturday, 13 December | 10:00 | Semifinals |
| Sunday, 14 December | 11:00 | Gold medal match |

== Men's singles ==
=== Seeds ===
1. (Singapore) Loh Kean Yew (quarter-finals)
2. (Indonesia) Alwi Farhan (gold medallist)
3. (Singapore) Jason Teh (First round)
4. (Malaysia) Leong Jun Hao (bronze medallist)

=== Finals ===
Semi-finals
(Indonesia) Zaki Ubaidillah | 21 | 21
4 | (Malaysia) Leong Jun Hao | 18 | 13
(Malaysia) Justin Hoh | 10 | 21 | 14
2 | (Indonesia) Alwi Farhan | 21 | 15 | 21

Final
(Indonesia) Zaki Ubaidillah | 21 | 8 | 12
2 | (Indonesia) Alwi Farhan | 13 | 21 | 21

==== Top half ====
First round
1 | (Singapore) Loh Kean Yew | 21 | 21
(Philippines) Jewel Angelo Albo | 17 | 19
(Vietnam) Lê Đức Phát | 21 | 9 | 19
(Indonesia) Zaki Ubaidillah | 17 | 21 | 21
4 | (Malaysia) Leong Jun Hao | 21 | 21
(Laos) Vixunnalath Phichith | 15 | 15
(Thailand) Panitchaphon Teeraratsakul | 21 | 21
(Myanmar) Phone Pyae Naing | 9 | 10

Quarter-finals
1 | (Singapore) Loh Kean Yew | 19 | 10
(Indonesia) Zaki Ubaidillah | 21 | 21
4 | (Malaysia) Leong Jun Hao | 21 | 21
(Thailand) Panitchaphon Teeraratsakul | 18 | 16

Semifinals
(Indonesia) Zaki Ubaidillah | 21 | 21
4 | (Malaysia) Leong Jun Hao | 18 | 13

==== Bottom half ====
First round
(Thailand) Kantaphon Wangcharoen | 21 | 21
(Myanmar) Hein Htut | 10 | 13
(Malaysia) Justin Hoh | 22 | 21
3 | (Singapore) Jason Teh | 20 | 15
(Laos) Xayyalath Souksavat | 11 | 8
(Philippines) Clarence Villaflor | 21 | 21
(Vietnam) Nguyễn Hải Đăng | 17 | 15
2 | (Indonesia) Alwi Farhan | 21 | 21

Quarter-finals
(Thailand) Kantaphon Wangcharoen | 15 | 17
(Malaysia) Justin Hoh | 21 | 21
(Philippines) Clarence Villaflor | 18 | 14
2 | (Indonesia) Alwi Farhan | 21 | 21

Semifinals
(Malaysia) Justin Hoh | 10 | 21 | 14
2 | (Indonesia) Alwi Farhan | 21 | 15 | 21

== Women's singles ==
=== Seeds ===
1. (Indonesia) Putri Kusuma Wardani (bronze medallist)
2. (Thailand) Ratchanok Intanon (gold medallist)
3. (Thailand) Supanida Katethong (silver medallist)
4. (Vietnam) Nguyễn Thùy Linh (first round)

=== Finals ===
Semi-finals
1 | (Indonesia) Putri Kusuma Wardani | 18 | 16
3 | (Thailand) Supanida Katethong | 21 | 21
(Malaysia) Wong Ling Ching | 11 | 21 | 17
2 | (Thailand) Ratchanok Intanon | 21 | 18 | 21

Final
3 | (Thailand) Supanida Katethong | 19 | 7
2 | (Thailand) Ratchanok Intanon | 21 | 21

==== Top half ====
First round
(Malaysia) Letshanaa Karupathevan | 21 | 22
(Singapore) Jaslyn Hooi | 17 | 20
3 | (Thailand) Supanida Katethong | 21 | 21
(Vietnam) Vũ Thị Trang | 19 | 7
(Philippines) Mikaela Joy De Guzman | 21 | 21
(Myanmar) Lin Lin Htet | 8 | 12

Quarter-finals
1 | (Indonesia) Putri Kusuma Wardani | 21 | 21
(Malaysia) Letshanaa Karupathevan | 18 | 13
3 | (Thailand) Supanida Katethong | 21 | 24
(Philippines) Mikaela Joy De Guzman | 12 | 22

Semifinals
1 | (Indonesia) Putri Kusuma Wardani | 18 | 16
3 | (Thailand) Supanida Katethong | 21 | 21

==== Bottom half ====
First round
(Malaysia) Wong Ling Ching | 21 | 21
(Singapore) Insyirah Khan | 16 | 15
(Indonesia) Ni Kadek Dhinda Amartya Pratiwi | 16 | 22 | 21
4 | (Vietnam) Nguyễn Thùy Linh | 21 | 20 | 14
(Laos) Phoutsavanh Daopasith | 9 | 11
(Philippines) Christel Rei Fuentespina | 21 | 21
(Myanmar) Thet Htar Thuzar | 15 | 14
2 | (Thailand) Ratchanok Intanon | 21 | 21

Quarter-finals
(Malaysia) Wong Ling Ching | 21 | 21
(Indonesia) Ni Kadek Dhinda Amartya Pratiwi | 11 | 17
(Philippines) Christel Rei Fuentespina | 12 | 10
2 | (Thailand) Ratchanok Intanon | 21 | 21

Semifinals
(Malaysia) Wong Ling Ching | 11 | 21 | 17
2 | (Thailand) Ratchanok Intanon | 21 | 18 | 21

== Men's doubles ==
=== Seeds ===
1. (Malaysia) Aaron Chia / Soh Wooi Yik (silver medallists)
2. (Malaysia) Man Wei Chong / Tee Kai Wun (bronze medallists)
3. (Indonesia) Sabar Karyaman Gutama / Muhammad Reza Pahlevi Isfahani (gold medallists)
4. (Indonesia) Leo Rolly Carnando / Bagas Maulana (bronze medallists)

=== Finals ===
Semi-finals
1 | (Malaysia) Aaron Chia (Malaysia) Soh Wooi Yik | 21 | 21
4 | (Indonesia) Leo Rolly Carnando (Indonesia) Bagas Maulana | 10 | 12
3 | (Indonesia) Sabar Karyaman Gutama (Indonesia) Muhammad Reza Pahlevi Isfahani | 21 | 21
2 | (Malaysia) Man Wei Chong (Malaysia) Tee Kai Wun | 16 | 17

Final
1 | (Malaysia) Aaron Chia (Malaysia) Soh Wooi Yik | 14 | 17
3 | (Indonesia) Sabar Karyaman Gutama (Indonesia) Muhammad Reza Pahlevi Isfahani | 21 | 21

==== Top half ====
First round
(Laos) Namboun Luangamath (Laos) Phonesack Sokthavy | 7 | 17
(Thailand) Supak Jomkoh (Thailand) Kittinupong Kedren | 21 | 21
4 | (Indonesia) Leo Rolly Carnando (Indonesia) Bagas Maulana | 21 | 21
(Myanmar) Hein Thiha Aung (Myanmar) Phone Htet Zaw | 4 | 7
(Philippines) Christian Bernardo (Philippines) Alvin Morada | 10 | 10
(Singapore) Wesley Koh (Singapore) Junsuke Kubo | 21 | 21

Quarter-finals
1 | (Malaysia) Aaron Chia (Malaysia) Soh Wooi Yik | 21 | 21
(Thailand) Supak Jomkoh (Thailand) Kittinupong Kedren | 16 | 16
4 | (Indonesia) Leo Rolly Carnando (Indonesia) Bagas Maulana | 21 | 21
(Singapore) Wesley Koh (Singapore) Junsuke Kubo | 17 | 19

Semifinals
1 | (Malaysia) Aaron Chia (Malaysia) Soh Wooi Yik | 21 | 21
4 | (Indonesia) Leo Rolly Carnando (Indonesia) Bagas Maulana | 10 | 12

==== Bottom half ====
First round
(Philippines) Solomon Padiz Jr. (Philippines) Julius Villabrille | 21 | 21
(Singapore) Donovan Willard Wee (Singapore) Howin Wong | 16 | 18
(Myanmar) Phyo Thurain Kyaw (Myanmar) Lai Zuidika | 11 | 10
3 | (Indonesia) Sabar Karyaman Gutama (Indonesia) Muhammad Reza Pahlevi Isfahani | 21 | 21
(Laos) Phanthalang Outhaithani (Laos) Vixunnalath Phichith | 6 | 7
(Thailand) Peeratchai Sukphun (Thailand) Pakkapon Teeraratsakul | 21 | 21

Quarter-finals
(Philippines) Solomon Padiz Jr. (Philippines) Julius Villabrille | 11 | 17
3 | (Indonesia) Sabar Karyaman Gutama (Indonesia) Muhammad Reza Pahlevi Isfahani | 21 | 21
(Thailand) Peeratchai Sukphun (Thailand) Pakkapon Teeraratsakul | 16 | 19
2 | (Malaysia) Man Wei Chong (Malaysia) Tee Kai Wun | 21 | 21

Semifinals
3 | (Indonesia) Sabar Karyaman Gutama (Indonesia) Muhammad Reza Pahlevi Isfahani | 21 | 21
2 | (Malaysia) Man Wei Chong (Malaysia) Tee Kai Wun | 16 | 17

== Women's doubles ==
=== Seeds ===
1. (Malaysia) Pearly Tan / Thinaah Muralitharan (gold medallists)
2. (Malaysia) Go Pei Kee / Teoh Mei Xing (quarter-finals)
3. (Thailand) Ornnicha Jongsathapornparn / Sukitta Suwachai (first round)
4. (Indonesia) Rachel Allessya Rose / Febi Setianingrum (bronze medallists)

=== Finals ===
Semi-finals
1 | (Malaysia) Pearly Tan (Malaysia) Thinaah Muralitharan | 21 | 19 | 21
4 | (Indonesia) Rachel Allessya Rose (Indonesia) Febi Setianingrum | 14 | 21 | 16
(Vietnam) Bùi Bích Phương (Vietnam) Vũ Thị Trang | 10 | 9
(Indonesia) Febriana Dwipuji Kusuma (Indonesia) Meilysa Trias Puspita Sari | 21 | 21

Final
1 | (Malaysia) Pearly Tan (Malaysia) Thinaah Muralitharan | 21 | 19 | 21
(Indonesia) Febriana Dwipuji Kusuma (Indonesia) Meilysa Trias Puspita Sari | 16 | 21 | 17

==== Top half ====
First round
(Thailand) Benyapa Aimsaard (Thailand) Sapsiree Taerattanachai | 21 | 21
(Philippines) Eleanor Christine Inlayo (Philippines) Jeya Von Pinlac | 16 | 13
4 | (Indonesia) Rachel Allessya Rose (Indonesia) Febi Setianingrum | 21 | 21
(Singapore) Li Zheng Hong (Singapore) Li Zheng Yan | 11 | 11
(Vietnam) Phạm Thị Diệu Ly (Vietnam) Phạm Thị Khánh | 21 | 21
(Myanmar) Ngar Myar (Myanmar) Eaint Chit Phoo | 9 | 12

Quarter-finals
1 | (Malaysia) Pearly Tan (Malaysia) Thinaah Muralitharan | 21 | 21
(Thailand) Benyapa Aimsaard (Thailand) Sapsiree Taerattanachai | 11 | 14
4 | (Indonesia) Rachel Allessya Rose (Indonesia) Febi Setianingrum | 19 | 21 | 21
(Vietnam) Phạm Thị Diệu Ly (Vietnam) Phạm Thị Khánh | 21 | 13 | 14

Semifinals
1 | (Malaysia) Pearly Tan (Malaysia) Thinaah Muralitharan | 21 | 19 | 21
4 | (Indonesia) Rachel Allessya Rose (Indonesia) Febi Setianingrum | 14 | 21 | 16

==== Bottom half ====
First round
(Myanmar) Su Latt (Myanmar) Khiang Thin Zar | 8 | 16
(Philippines) Andrea Princess Hernandez (Philippines) Mary Destiny Untal | 21 | 21
(Vietnam) Bùi Bích Phương (Vietnam) Vũ Thị Trang | 22 | 20 | 21
3 | (Thailand) Orninicha Jongsathapornparn (Thailand) Sukitta Suwachai | 20 | 22 | 17
(Singapore) Insyirah Khan (Singapore) Lee Xin Yi Megan | 10 | 9
(Indonesia) Febriana Dwipuji Kusuma (Indonesia) Meilysa Trias Puspita Sari | 21 | 21

Quarter-finals
(Philippines) Andrea Princess Hernandez (Philippines) Mary Destiny Untal | 11 | 10
(Vietnam) Bùi Bích Phương (Vietnam) Vũ Thị Trang | 21 | 21
(Indonesia) Febriana Dwipuji Kusuma (Indonesia) Meilysa Trias Puspita Sari | 21 | 21
2 | (Malaysia) Go Pei Kee (Malaysia) Teoh Mei Xing | 15 | 12

Semifinals
(Vietnam) Bùi Bích Phương (Vietnam) Vũ Thị Trang | 10 | 9
(Indonesia) Febriana Dwipuji Kusuma (Indonesia) Meilysa Trias Puspita Sari | 21 | 21

== Mixed doubles ==
=== Seeds ===
1. (Malaysia) Chen Tang Jie / Toh Ee Wei (bronze medallists)
2. (Thailand) Dechapol Puavaranukroh / Supissara Paewsampran (silver medallists)
3. (Indonesia) Jafar Hidayatullah / Felisha Pasaribu (bronze medallists)
4. (Thailand) Ruttanapak Oupthong / Jhenicha Sudjaipraparat (gold medallists)

=== Finals ===
Semi-finals
1 | (Malaysia) Chen Tang Jie (Malaysia) Toh Ee Wei | 15 | 16
4 | (Thailand) Ruttanapak Oupthong (Thailand) Jhenicha Sudjaipraparat | 21 | 21
3 | (Indonesia) Jafar Hidayatullah (Indonesia) Felisha Pasaribu | 17 | 15
2 | (Thailand) Dechapol Puavaranukroh (Thailand) Supissara Paewsampran | 21 | 21

Final
4 | (Thailand) Ruttanapak Oupthong (Thailand) Jhenicha Sudjaipraparat | 22 | 21
2 | (Thailand) Dechapol Puavaranukroh (Thailand) Supissara Paewsampran | 20 | 19

==== Top half ====
First round
(Singapore) Terry Hee (Singapore) Jin Yujia | 21 | 21
(Indonesia) Amri Syahnawi (Indonesia) Nita Violina Marwah | 18 | 14
(Philippines) Julius Villabrille (Philippines) Andrea Princess Hernandez | 21 | 21
(Myanmar) Phyo Thurain Kyaw (Myanmar) Su Latt | 13 | 6

Quarter-finals
1 | (Malaysia) Chen Tang Jie (Malaysia) Toh Ee Wei | 21 | 21
(Singapore) Terry Hee (Singapore) Jin Yujia | 12 | 14
4 | (Thailand) Ruttanapak Oupthong (Thailand) Jhenicha Sudjaipraparat | 19 | 21 | 21
(Philippines) Julius Villabrille (Philippines) Andrea Princess Hernandez | 21 | 10 | 5

Semifinals
1 | (Malaysia) Chen Tang Jie (Malaysia) Toh Ee Wei | 15 | 16
4 | (Thailand) Ruttanapak Oupthong (Thailand) Jhenicha Sudjaipraparat | 21 | 21

==== Bottom half ====
First round
(Laos) Namboun Luangamath (Laos) Phoutsavanh Daopasith | 11 | 14
(Myanmar) Hein Htut (Myanmar) Thet Htar Thuzar | 21 | 21
(Singapore) Wesley Koh (Singapore) Li Zheng Yan | 21 | 8 | 19
3 | (Indonesia) Jafar Hidayatullah (Indonesia) Felisha Pasaribu | 19 | 21 | 21
(Malaysia) Hoo Pang Ron (Malaysia) Cheng Su Yin | 21 | 21
(Philippines) Solomon Jr. Padiz (Philippines) Mary Destiny Untal | 8 | 14

Quarter-finals
(Myanmar) Hein Htut (Myanmar) Thet Htar Thuzar | 8 | 5
3 | (Indonesia) Jafar Hidayatullah (Indonesia) Felisha Pasaribu | 21 | 21
(Malaysia) Hoo Pang Ron (Malaysia) Cheng Su Yin | 12 | 15
2 | (Thailand) Dechapol Puavaranukroh (Thailand) Supissara Paewsampran | 21 | 21

Semifinals
3 | (Indonesia) Jafar Hidayatullah (Indonesia) Felisha Pasaribu | 17 | 15
2 | (Thailand) Dechapol Puavaranukroh (Thailand) Supissara Paewsampran | 21 | 21

== See also ==
- Men's team tournament
- Women's team tournament
