= Bonn International =

Badminton championships held in Germany

The Bonn International is an international badminton tournament held in Bonn, Germany. The event is part of the Badminton World Federation's Future Series and part of the Badminton Europe Elite Circuit. It was held for the first time in 2019.

== Past winners ==
Year	Men's singles	Women's singles	Men's doubles	Women's doubles	Mixed doubles
2019	(France) Arnaud Merklé	(Germany) Nguyen Thuc Phuong	(Denmark) Philip Illum Klindt (Denmark) Mads Thøgersen	(Belgium) Lise Jaques (Belgium) Flore Vandenhoucke	(Germany) Peter Lang (Germany) Hannah Pohl
2020	Cancelled (Note: This tournament, originally to be played from 10 to 13 June, was later cancelled due to the COVID-19 pandemic in Germany.)				
2021	Cancelled (Note: This tournament, originally to be played from 16 to 19 June, was later cancelled due to the COVID-19 pandemic in Germany.)				
2022	(Malaysia) Justin Hoh	(Indonesia) Stephanie Widjaja	(Chinese Taipei) Chiu Hsiang-chieh (Chinese Taipei) Yang Ming-tse	(Chinese Taipei) Hsu Ya-ching (Chinese Taipei) Lin Wan-ching	(Indonesia) Amri Syahnawi (Indonesia) Winny Oktavina Kandow
2023	(Chinese Taipei) Wang Po-wei	(Chinese Taipei) Hung Yi-ting	(Chinese Taipei) Chen Bo-yuan (Chinese Taipei) Lin Shang-kai	(Turkey) Bengisu Erçetin (Turkey) Nazlıcan İnci	(Germany) Malik Bourakkadi (Germany) Leona Michalski
2024	(Chinese Taipei) Cheng Kai	(India) Tanvi Sharma	(Chinese Taipei) Cheng Kai (Chinese Taipei) Su Wei-cheng	(Turkey) Yasemen Bektaş (Turkey) Zehra Erdem	(Indonesia) Alden Lefilson Putra Mainaky (Indonesia) Fitriani
2025	(Canada) Joshua Nguyen	(Germany) Miranda Wilson	(Germany) Jonathan Dresp (Germany) Simon Krax	(France) Agathe Cuevas (France) Kathell Desmots-Chacun	(Germany) Jan Colin Völker (Germany) Stine Küspert
2026	(Hong Kong) Lam Ka To	(Chinese Taipei) Liao Jui-chi	(Germany) Danial Marzuan (Germany) Aaron Sonnenschein	(Chinese Taipei) Chen Hsin-tung (Chinese Taipei) Chen Yu-hsi	(Switzerland) Nicolas Franconville (Switzerland) Julie Franconville

== Performances by nation ==
As of the 2026 edition

No	Nation	MS	WS	MD	WD	XD	Total
1	Chinese Taipei	2	2	3	2		9
2	Germany		2	2		3	7
3	Indonesia		1			2	3
4	France	1			1		2
4	Turkey				2		2
6	Belgium				1		1
6	Canada	1					1
6	Denmark			1			1
6	Hong Kong	1					1
6	India		1				1
6	Malaysia	1					1
6	Switzerland					1	1
Total		6	6	6	6	6	30
