= Alwi Farhan =

Indonesian badminton player (born 2005)

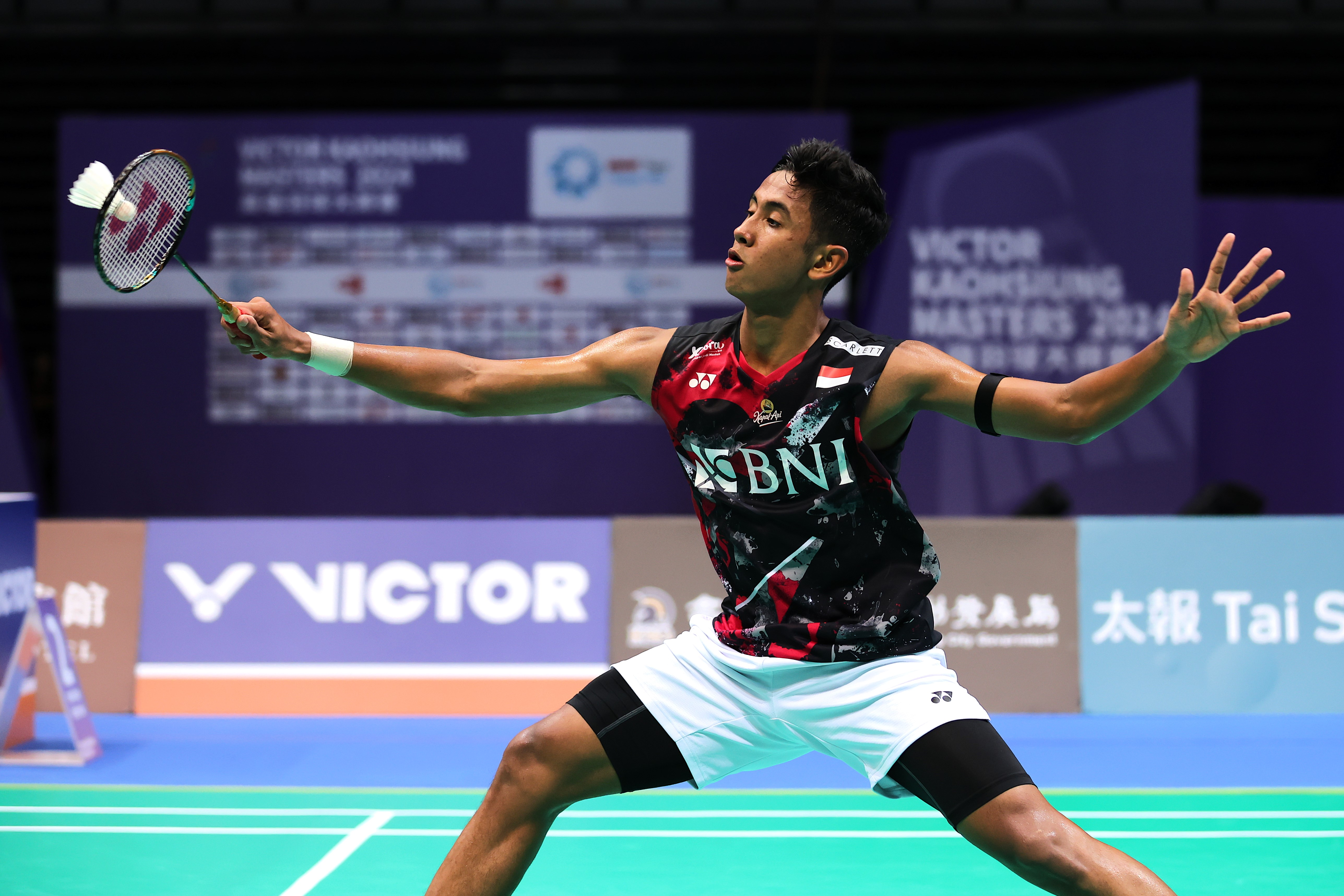
- Farhan at the 2024 Kaohsiung Masters

Personal information
- Born: Alwi Farhan Alhasny; 12 May 2005 (age 21) Surakarta, Central Java, Indonesia
- Height: 1.74 m (5 ft 9 in)
- Weight: 65 kg (143 lb)

Sport
- Country: Indonesia
- Sport: Badminton
- Handedness: Right
- Coached by: Indra Wijaya

Men's singles
- Highest ranking: 10 (16 June 2026)
- Current ranking: 10 (27 October 2026)
- BWF profile
Medal record
Men's badminton
Representing Indonesia
Sudirman Cup
Bronze medal – third place	2025 Xiamen	Mixed team
Thomas Cup
Silver medal – second place	2024 Chengdu	Men's team
Asian Games
Gold medal – first place	2026 Aichi–Nagoya	Men's team
Bronze medal – third place	2026 Aichi–Nagoya	Men's singles
Asia Mixed Team Championships
Gold medal – first place	2025 Qingdao	Mixed team
SEA Games
Gold medal – first place	2023 Cambodia	Men's team
Gold medal – first place	2025 Thailand	Men's singles
Gold medal – first place	2025 Thailand	Men's team
World Junior Championships
Gold medal – first place	2023 Spokane	Boys' singles
Silver medal – second place	2023 Spokane	Mixed team
Bronze medal – third place	2022 Santander	Mixed team
Asian Junior Championships
Silver medal – second place	2023 Yogyakarta	Mixed team
Bronze medal – third place	2023 Yogyakarta	Boys' singles

Alwi Farhan Alhasny (born 12 May 2005) is an Indonesian badminton player. He won the gold medal in the men's singles at the 2025 SEA Games. He also part of the Indonesia men's team squad that won the gold medals at the 2023 and 2025 SEA Games, as well at the 2026 Asian Games. In the juniors, Farhan won the boys' singles title at the 2023 World Junior Championships.

== Career ==
=== 2021–2022 ===
Farhan was promoted into the men's singles first team in 2021. In June 2022, he reached the finals of the Lithuanian International. He obtained a BWF World Junior Championships mixed team bronze medal as part of the Indonesian team. In the individual event, he lost in the second round to eventual bronze medalist Panitchaphon Teeraratsakul

=== 2023–2024 ===
In April, Farhan reached the final of the Osaka International, but was defeated by host player Yushi Tanaka. He was called up for the 2023 SEA Games squad to substitute the late Syabda Perkasa Belawa. Farhan and the men's team later gave tribute to Syabda after winning the team event.

Farhan closed off his final year in the junior circuit by captaining Indonesia's mixed teams in the Asian and the World Junior Championships. While Indonesia finished as runners-up in both mixed team events, Farhan earned his own spotlight at the individual events. He brought home a bronze medal from the Asian Junior Championships and became Indonesia's first ever boy's singles world champion.

In September, Farhan won his first senior title at the Indonesia International tournament in Medan. In the next tour, he lost at the first round of Indonesia Masters Super 100 I to Aidil Sholeh.

2024 was Farhan's first full year at the World Tour. His notable results included reaching the semi-finals in the Macau Open and reaching the finals at both editions of the Indonesia Masters Super 100, winning the one in November. He also made his debut at the Badminton Asia Team Championships and the Thomas Cup, where the team finished in the quarter-finals at the Asia Team Championships and won the silver medal at the Thomas Cup.

=== 2025 ===
Farhan helped Indonesia secure its first ever Badminton Asia Mixed Team Championships title, having won all his matches including an upset against veteran Ng Ka Long. He went on to his Sudirman Cup debut as the team's second-ranked men's singles player, making his mark with a victory against world number 3 Anders Antonsen at the group stage and coming home with a bronze medal.

After strings of early exits against more experienced players, Farhan secured his first World Tour title at the Macau Open Super 300. His debut at the BWF World Championships ended in the third round after a tight three-game match against Olympic silver medalist Kunlavut Vitidsarn. At the Korea Open, he overturned a losing situation to Weng Hongyang to reach the semi-finals, where he conceded to eventual champion Jonatan Christie. Unfortunately, he did not manage to join his compatriots at the Australia Open finals, after suffering a reverse sweep in a quarter-final match against Chou Tien-chen.

Farhan wrapped up an eventful year with a second SEA Games team event gold and winning the individual men's singles title against compatriot Zaki Ubaidillah.

=== 2026 ===
Farhan's Super 1000 debut at the Malaysia Open ended early due to stomach problems plaguing his match against Alex Lanier. He rebounded at the Indonesia Masters, snatching Indonesia's sole title at home with a 25-minute victory against Panitchaphon Teeraratsakul. However, he missed out on a consecutive final opportunity after losing at the Thailand Masters semi-final to eventual champion Zaki Ubaidillah.

In his All England Open debut, Farhan finally avenged his Australia Open loss to Chou Tien-chen. However, he lost tamely to Kunlavut Vitidsarn in the quarter-finals. On the next tournament, he moved to the final in the Swiss Open but lost to Yushi Tanaka. Three months later, Farhan won his second title of the year at the Australian Open when he defeated the 73th ranked player, Dong Tianyao in straight games. On his Asian Games debut, Farhan contributed the winning point for the Indonesian men's team, which won the gold medal after defeating China in the final.

== Achievements ==
=== Asian Games ===
Men's singles
Year	Venue	Opponent	Score	Result	Ref.
2026	Ichinomiya City Municipal Gymnasium; Ichinomiya, Japan	(Thailand) Kunlavut Vitidsarn	13–21, 15–21	Bronze	

=== SEA Games ===
Men's singles
Year	Venue	Opponent	Score	Result	Ref.
2025	Gymnasium 4 Thammasat University Rangsit Campus; Pathum Thani, Thailand	(Indonesia) Zaki Ubaidillah	13–21, 21–8, 21–12	Gold	

=== World Junior Championships ===
Boys' singles
Year	Venue	Opponent	Score	Result	Ref.
2023	The Podium; Spokane, United States	(China) Hu Zhe'an	21–19, 19–21, 21–15	Gold	

=== Asian Junior Championships ===
Boys' singles
Year	Venue	Opponent	Score	Result	Ref.
2023	Among Rogo Sports Hall; Yogyakarta, Indonesia	(China) Hu Zhe'an	17–21, 13–21	Bronze	

=== BWF World Tour (4 titles, 2 runner-up) ===
The BWF World Tour, which was announced on 19 March 2017 and implemented in 2018, is a series of elite badminton tournaments sanctioned by the Badminton World Federation (BWF). The BWF World Tour is divided into levels of World Tour Finals, Super 1000, Super 750, Super 500, Super 300 (part of the HSBC World Tour), and the BWF Tour Super 100.

Men's singles
Year	Tournament	Level	Opponent	Score	Result	Ref.
2024 (I)	Indonesia Masters	Super 100	(Indonesia) Zaki Ubaidillah	16–21, 14–21	(silver) Runner-up	
2024 (II)	Indonesia Masters	Super 100	(Malaysia) Aidil Sholeh	21–10, 21–9	(gold) Winner	
2025	Macau Open	Super 300	(Malaysia) Justin Hoh	21–15, 21–5	(gold) Winner	
2026	Indonesia Masters	Super 500	(Thailand) Panitchaphon Teeraratsakul	21–5, 21–6	(gold) Winner	
2026	Swiss Open	Super 300	(Japan) Yushi Tanaka	18–21, 12–21	(silver) Runner-up	
2026	Australian Open	Super 500	(China) Dong Tianyao	21–13, 21–13	(gold) Winner	

=== BWF International Challenge/Series (1 title, 2 runners-up) ===
Men's singles
Year	Tournament	Opponent	Score	Result	Ref.
2022	Lithuanian International	(Indonesia) Syabda Perkasa Belawa	15–21, 14–21	(silver) Runner-up	
2023	Osaka International	(Japan) Yushi Tanaka	21–15, 14–21, 17–21	(silver) Runner-up	
2023 (I)	Indonesia International	(Sri Lanka) Viren Nettasinghe	21–15, 21–10	(gold) Winner	

BWF International Challenge tournament
BWF International Series tournament
BWF Future Series tournament

=== BWF Junior International (2 titles, 1 runner-up) ===
Boys' singles
Year	Tournament	Opponent	Score	Result	Ref.
2021	Finnish Junior International	(Indonesia) Yohanes Saut Marcellyno	14–21, 14–21	(silver) Runner-up	
2021	Bangladesh Junior International	(Indonesia) Iqbal Diaz Syahputra	21–19, 18–21, 21–13	(gold) Winner	
2022	Alpes U–19 International	(Indonesia) Bodhi Ratana Teja Gotama	21–12, 21–17	(gold) Winner	

BWF Junior International Grand Prix tournament
BWF Junior International Challenge tournament
BWF Junior International Series tournament
BWF Junior Future Series tournament

== Performance timeline ==
Key

W	Won	F	Finalist	SF	Semi-finalist
QF	Quarter-finalist	#R	Rounds 4, 3, 2, 1	RR	Round-robin stage
Q#	Qualification round	A	Absent	w/d	Withdrew
G	Gold	S	Silver	B	Bronze
NH	Not held	N/A	Not applicable	DNQ	Did not qualify

=== National team ===
- Junior level

Team events	2022	2023	Ref
Asian Junior Championships	NH	S	
World Junior Championships	B	S	

- Senior level

Team events	2023	2024	2025	2026	Ref
SEA Games	G	NH	G	NH	
Asia Team Championships	NH	QF	NH	A	
Asia Mixed Team Championships	A	NH	G	NH	
Asian Games	NH			G	
Thomas Cup	NH	S	NH	GS	
Sudirman Cup	A	NH	B	NH	

=== Individual competitions ===
- Junior level

Events	2022	2023	Ref
Asian Junior Championships	NH	B	
World Junior Championships	2R	G	

- Senior level

Events	2025	2026	Ref
SEA Games	G	NH	
Asian Games	NH	B	
Asian Championships	2R	2R	
World Championships	3R	QF	

Tournament	BWF World Tour				Best	Ref
Tournament	2023	2024	2025	2026	Best	Ref
Malaysia Open	A			1R	1R ('26)	
Indonesia Masters	A		Q2	W	W ('26)	
Thailand Masters	A	1R	QF	SF	SF ('26)	
German Open	A		2R	A	2R ('25)	
All England Open	A			QF	QF ('26)	
Swiss Open	A	2R	A	F	F ('26)	
Orléans Masters	A		1R	A	1R ('25)	
Thailand Open	A		2R	A	2R ('25)	
Malaysia Masters	A	Q1	2R	A	2R ('25)	
Singapore Open	A			SF	SF ('26)	
Indonesia Open	A		2R	2R	2R ('25, '26)	
Australian Open	A	2R	QF	W	W ('26)	
Macau Open	NH	SF	W	A	W ('25)	
Japan Open	A		2R	QF	QF ('26)	
China Open	A		1R	1R	1R ('25, '26)	
Taipei Open	A	2R	w/d	A	2R ('24)	
Korea Masters	1R	A			1R ('23)	
China Masters	A		1R	A	1R ('25)	
Indonesia Masters Super 100	1R	F	A		W ('24 II)	
Indonesia Masters Super 100	3R	W	A		W ('24 II)	
Denmark Open	A		1R	QF	QF ('26)	
French Open	A		QF	QF	QF ('25, '26)	
Korea Open	A		SF	2R	SF ('25)	
Japan Masters	A	1R	2R	SF	SF ('26)	
Kaohsiung Masters	A	QF	A		QF ('24)	
Hong Kong Open	A		QF	w/d	QF ('25)	
Syed Modi International	QF	A			QF ('23)	
Guwahati Masters	QF	A			QF ('23)	
Odisha Masters	SF	A			SF ('23)	
Spain Masters	A	Q2	NH		Q2 ('24)	
World Tour Finals	DNQ			Q	('26)	
Year-end ranking	60	46	17		10	
Tournament	2023	2024	2025	2026	Best	Ref

== Record against selected opponents ==
Record against year-end Finals finalists, World Championships semi-finalists, and Olympic quarter-finalists. As of 2026 Asian Games

Player	Matches	Win	Lost	Diff.
(China) Li Shifeng	3	2	1	+1
(China) Shi Yuqi	1	1	0	+1
(Chinese Taipei) Chou Tien-chen	5	2	3	–1
(Denmark) Anders Antonsen	2	1	1	0
(Denmark) Viktor Axelsen	1	0	1	–1
(France) Christo Popov	1	0	1	–1
(France) Alex Lanier	7	3	4	–1
(India) Lakshya Sen	2	2	0	+2
(India) Prannoy H.S.	2	2	0	+2
(Indonesia) Jonatan Christie	2	0	2	–2
(Japan) Kodai Naraoka	2	1	2	-1
(Malaysia) Lee Zii Jia	1	1	0	+1
(Singapore) Loh Kean Yew	1	0	1	–1
(Thailand) Kunlavut Vitidsarn	5	0	5	–5
