= Badminton at the 2025 SEA Games – Men's team =

Badminton – Men's team at the 2025 SEA Games
- Venue: Thammasat University Rangsit Campus
- Dates: 7–10 December 2025
- Nations: 7

Medalists
gold medal	Indonesia (INA)
silver medal	Malaysia (MAS)
bronze medal	Singapore (SGP)
bronze medal	Thailand (THA)

The men's team badminton tournament at the 2025 SEA Games is currently holding from 7 to 10 December 2025 at the Thammasat University Rangsit Campus, Pathum Thani, Thailand.

== Schedule ==
All times are Indochina Time (UTC+07:00)

Date	Time	Event
Sunday, 7 December	15:00	Quarterfinals
Monday, 8 December	15:00	Semifinals
Wednesday, 10 December	15:00	Gold medal match

== Bracket ==
Quarterfinals
3/4	Singapore (SGP)	3
Laos (LAO)	0
Myanmar (MYA)	0
3/4	Thailand (THA)	3
Philippines (PHI)	0
2	Malaysia (MAS)	3

Semifinals
1	Indonesia (INA)	3
3/4	Singapore (SGP)	1
3/4	Thailand (THA)	1
2	Malaysia (MAS)	3

Final
1	Indonesia (INA)	3
2	Malaysia (MAS)	0

== Quarterfinals ==
=== Singapore vs Laos ===
Singapore
3
Thammasat University Rangsit Campus
7 December 2025 15:00 UTC+7

Laos
0

			1	2	3
1	(Singapore) (Laos)	Loh Kean Yew; Xayyalath Souksavat	21; 8	21; 11
2	(Singapore) (Laos)	Jason Teh; Phonesack Sokthavy	21; 12	21; 15
3	(Singapore) (Laos)	Joel Koh; Vixunnalath Phichith	21; 11	21; 7
4	(Singapore) (Laos)	Wesley Koh / Junsuke Kubo; Namboun Luangamath / Phonesack Sokhavy				not played
5	(Singapore) (Laos)	Donovan Willard Wee / Jia Hao Howin Wong; Phanthalang Outhaithani / Vixunnalath Phichith				not played

=== Myanmar vs Thailand ===
Myanmar
0
Thammasat University Rangsit Campus
7 December 2025 15:00 UTC+7

Thailand
3

			1	2	3
1	(Myanmar) (Thailand)	Hein Htut; Kunlavut Vitidsarn	13; 21	15; 21
2	(Myanmar) (Thailand)	Hein Thiha Aung / Phone Htet Zaw; Kittinupong Kedren / Dechapol Puavaranukroh	14; 21	9; 21
3	(Myanmar) (Thailand)	Nyan Shaine Lin; Panitchaphon Teeraratsakul	4; 21	9; 21
4	(Myanmar) (Thailand)	Phyo Thurain Kyaw / Lal Zuidika; Peeratchai Sukphun / Pakkapon Teeraratsakul				not played
5	(Myanmar) (Thailand)	Phone Pyae Naing; Kantaphon Wangcharoen				not played

=== Philippines vs Malaysia ===
Philippines
0
Thammasat University Rangsit Campus
7 December 2025 15:00 UTC+7

Malaysia
3

			1	2	3
1	(Philippines) (Malaysia)	Jewel Angelo Albo; Leong Jun Hao	17; 21	18; 21
2	(Philippines) (Malaysia)	Solomon Padiz Jr. / Julius Villabrille; Man Wei Chong / Soh Wooi Yik	10; 21	12; 21
3	(Philippines) (Malaysia)	Clarence Villaflor; Justin Hoh	18; 21	19; 21
4	(Philippines) (Malaysia)	Christian Bernardo / Alvin Morada; Aaron Chia / Tee Kai Wun				not played
5	(Philippines) (Malaysia)	Jamal Rahmat Pandi; Aidil Sholeh				not played

== Semifinals ==
=== Indonesia vs Singapore ===
Indonesia
3
Thammasat University Rangsit Campus
8 December 2025 15:00 UTC+7

Singapore
1

			1	2	3
1	(Indonesia) (Singapore)	Alwi Farhan; Loh Kean Yew	15; 21	21; 14	8; 21
2	(Indonesia) (Singapore)	S K Gutama / M R P Isfahani; Wesley Koh / Junsuke Kubo	21; 18	18; 21	21; 10
3	(Indonesia) (Singapore)	Moh. Zaki Ubaidillah; Jason Teh	21; 2	21; 13
4	(Indonesia) (Singapore)	Leo Rolly Carnando / Bagas Maulana; Donovan Willard Wee / Howin Wong	21; 12	21; 19
5	(Indonesia) (Singapore)	Prahdiska Bagas Shujiwo; Ding Hanjin				not played

=== Thailand vs Malaysia ===
Thailand
1
Thammasat University Rangsit Campus
8 December 2025 15:00 UTC+7

Malaysia
3

			1	2	3
1	(Thailand) (Malaysia)	Kunlavut Vitidsarn; Leong Jun Hao	21; 15	21; 15
2	(Thailand) (Malaysia)	Supak Jomkoh / Peeratchai Sukphun; Aaron Chia / Soh Wooi Yik	18; 21	19; 21
3	(Thailand) (Malaysia)	Panitchaphon Teeraratsakul; Justin Hoh	10; 21	17; 21
4	(Thailand) (Malaysia)	Dechapol Puavaranukroh / Pakkapon Teeraratsakul; Man Wei Chong / Tee Kai Wun	14; 21	21; 18	17; 21
5	(Thailand) (Malaysia)	Wongsup Wongsup-in; Aidil Sholeh				not played

== Final ==
=== Indonesia vs Malaysia ===
Indonesia
3
Thammasat University Rangsit Campus
10 December 2025 15:00 UTC+7

Malaysia
0

			1	2	3
1	(Indonesia) (Malaysia)	Alwi Farhan; Leong Jun Hao	21; 12	21; 19
2	(Indonesia) (Malaysia)	Sabar Karyaman Gutama / Moh Reza Pahlevi Isfahani; Aaron Chia / Soh Wooi Yik	21; 12	21; 12
3	(Indonesia) (Malaysia)	Moh. Zaki Ubaidillah; Justin Hoh	21; 12	21; 14
4	(Indonesia) (Malaysia)	Leo Rolly Carnando / Bagas Maulana; Man Wei Chong / Tee Kai Wun				not played
5	(Indonesia) (Malaysia)	Yohanes Saut Marcellyno; Aidil Sholeh				not played

== See also ==
- Individual event tournament
- Women's team tournament
