= Aidil Sholeh =

Malaysian badminton player (born 2000)

Personal information
- Born: Aidil Sholeh bin Ali Sadikin; 9 January 2000 (age 26) Selangor, Malaysia
- Height: 1.71 m (5 ft 7 in)
- Weight: 65 kg (143 lb)

Sport
- Country: Malaysia
- Sport: Badminton
- Handedness: Right
- Coached by: Nova Armada

Men's singles
- Highest ranking: 39 (7 October 2025)
- Current ranking: 88 (18 August 2026)
- BWF profile
Medal record
Men's badminton
Representing Malaysia
Sudirman Cup
Bronze medal – third place	2021 Vantaa	Mixed team
Asia Team Championships
Gold medal – first place	2022 Selangor	Men's team
SEA Games
Silver medal – second place	2019 Philippines	Men's team
Silver medal – second place	2025 Thailand	Men's team
World Junior Championships
Silver medal – second place	2017 Yogyakarta	Mixed team

Aidil Sholeh bin Ali Sadikin (born 9 January 2000) is a Malaysian badminton player. He was among the players that helped Malaysia win a silver in the 2017 BWF World Junior Championships mixed team.

== Career ==
=== 2019 ===
In August, Aidil finished as runner-up at the Hellas Open after losing in the final to compatriot Lim Chong King. He also won silver in the men's team event at the 2019 SEA Games in December.

=== 2021 ===
In September, he was selected as a backup player for the Malaysian squad that participated in the 2021 Sudirman Cup. Few months later, he reached the semi-finals of the Scottish Open.

=== 2022 ===
Aidil was part of the Malaysian men's team that won gold at the Badminton Asia Team Championships in February. He was chosen as the second singles player in the group stage tie against Japan. In April, he competed at the 2022 Badminton Asia Championships. In December, Aidil entered his first final in over three years at the Malaysia International but fell to compatriot Justin Hoh in three games.

=== 2023 ===
In October, Aidil reached the final of Indonesia International in Surabaya where he successfully captured his first career title, beating Japan's Keita Makino in straight sets.

=== 2024 ===
Aidil left the national team in June. In August, he was invited by Nova Armada to become the sparring partner for Cheah Liek Hou and Muhammad Fareez Anuar before the 2024 Paralympic Games. In November, he competed at the Indonesia Masters in Surabaya. He lost out to Alwi Farhan in the final, finishing as second best.

=== 2025 ===
In March, Aidil won his second career title at the Sri Lanka International, his first since leaving the national setup. In the following week, he reached the semi-final of the Ruichang China Masters, where he lost to the eventual winner, Sun Chao.

== Achievements ==
=== BWF World Tour (1 title, 2 runners-up) ===
The BWF World Tour, which was announced on 19 March 2017 and implemented in 2018, is a series of elite badminton tournaments sanctioned by the Badminton World Federation (BWF). The BWF World Tours are divided into levels of World Tour Finals, Super 1000, Super 750, Super 500, Super 300 (part of the HSBC World Tour), and the BWF Tour Super 100.

Men's singles
Year	Tournament	Level	Opponent	Score	Result	Ref.
2024 (II)	Indonesia Masters	Super 100	(Indonesia) Alwi Farhan	10–21, 9–21	(silver) Runner-up	
2025	Al Ain Masters	Super 100	(Finland) Joakim Oldorff	21–14, 17–21, 7–21	(silver) Runner-up	
2026	Vietnam Open	Super 100	(Singapore) Jason Teh	21–16, 21–14	(gold) Winner	

=== BWF International Challenge/Series (2 titles, 2 runners-up) ===
Men's singles
Year	Tournament	Opponent	Score	Result
2019	Hellas Open	(Malaysia) Lim Chong King	21–8, 13–21, 15–21	(silver) Runner-up
2022	Malaysia International	(Malaysia) Justin Hoh	21–18, 16–21, 17–21	(silver) Runner-up
2023 (II)	Indonesia International	(Japan) Keita Makino	21–14, 21–6	(gold) Winner
2025	Sri Lanka International	(India) Pranay Katta	21–19, 21–15	(gold) Winner

BWF International Challenge tournament
BWF International Series tournament
BWF Future Series tournament
