= Justin Hoh =

Malaysian badminton player (born 2004)

Justin Hoh 贺首维
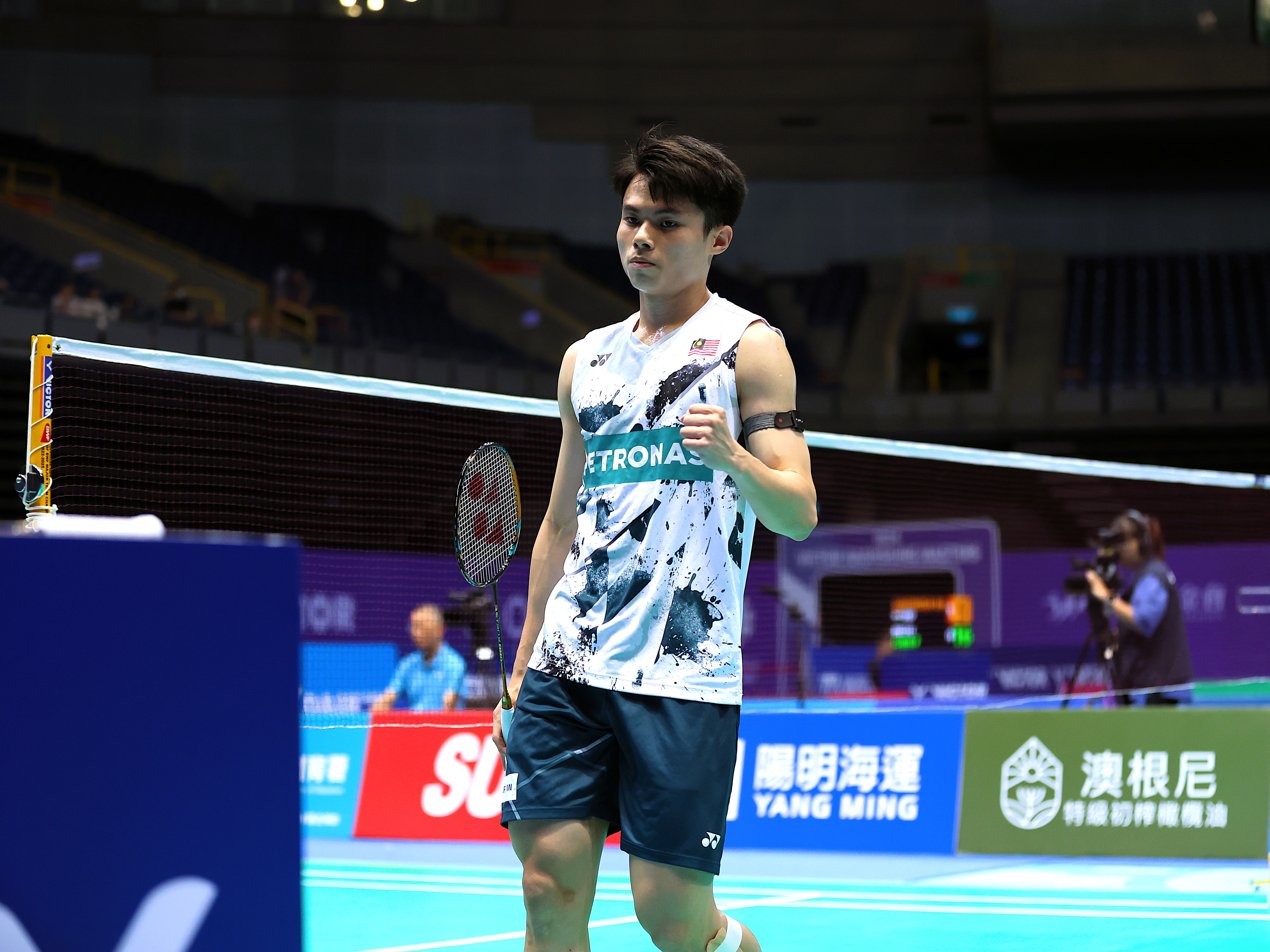
- Hoh at the 2024 Kaohsiung Masters

Personal information
- Born: Justin Hoh Shou Wei; 1 April 2004 (age 22) Kuala Lumpur, Malaysia
- Years active: 2017–present
- Height: 1.80 m (5 ft 11 in)

Sport
- Country: Malaysia
- Sport: Badminton
- Handedness: Right
- Coached by: Kenneth Jonassen

Men's singles
- Career record: 159 wins, 38 losses
- Highest ranking: 36 (11 November 2025)
- Current ranking: 45 (6 October 2026)
- BWF profile
Medal record
Men's badminton
Representing Malaysia
Thomas Cup
Bronze medal – third place	2024 Chengdu	Men's team
SEA Games
Silver medal – second place	2021 Vietnam	Men's team
Silver medal – second place	2025 Thailand	Men's team
Bronze medal – third place	2025 Thailand	Men's singles

Justin Hoh Shou Wei (Note: simplified Chinese: 贺首维; traditional Chinese: 賀首維; pinyin: Hè Shǒuwéi.; In this Chinese name, the family name is Hoh. In accordance with custom, the Western-style name is Justin Hoh and the Chinese-style name is Hoh Shou Wei.) (born 1 April 2004) is a Malaysian badminton player. A former world junior number one, Asian under-17 champion and SEA Games bronze medalist, he won the boys' singles gold medal at the 2019 Badminton Asia Under-17 Championships and finished runners-up at the 2025 Macau Open, a BWF World Tour Super 300 tournament. His appearance in the final of the Macau Open marked his first BWF World Tour final, where he lost to Indonesia's Alwi Farhan.

Hoh won a bronze medal in men's singles at the 2025 SEA Games and was part of the Malaysian men's teams that won silver medals at the 2021 and 2025 SEA Games. He was also a member of the national squad that secured a bronze medal at the 2024 Thomas Cup. Individually, he has won six BWF International Challenge and International Series men's singles titles, including the 2022 Bonn International, 2022 Croatia Open, 2022 Malaysia International, 2023 Uganda International, 2024 Slovenia Open and 2024 Saipan International. His 2019 Asian under-17 title was one of his earliest major junior achievements before he progressed to senior international competition.

== Early life ==
Hoh was born in Kuala Lumpur. He started playing badminton at the age of seven.

== Career ==
=== 2019 ===
In December, Hoh won the Asian Youth Championships beating Jason Gunawan from Hong Kong in the boys' singles U-17 final. Just one week later, he won the men's doubles U-19 title at the Bangladesh Junior International with his partner Fazriq Razif beating compatriot Eogene Ewe and Ong Zhen Yi in the final.

=== 2021 ===
After more than a year not competing internationally due to pandemic, in October, Hoh made a comeback at the Finnish Junior where he won the men's doubles U-19 title with his partner Ong Zhen Yi, beating compatriot Fazriq Razif & Wong Vin Sean in an all-Malaysian final.

=== 2022 ===
In May, Hoh won the National Under-21 Championships for the first time after beating Chia Jeng Hon.

In June, he won his first senior title at the Bonn International after beating Su Li-yang in the final. He then proceeded to win his second senior title in the following week at Croatia Open, after defeating Nguyễn Hải Đăng from Vietnam in 80 minutes.

In August, he won his third international title for the season at the India Junior International after defeating his opponent, Pranay Shettigar from India.

Hoh was promoted to senior ranks in November.

In December, he won the Malaysia International title, beating compatriot Aidil Sholeh in the final.

=== 2023 ===
In January, Hoh competed at the Iran Fajr International and finished as runner-up.

In February, he captured his fourth senior title at the Uganda International.

In March, he was selected to represent Malaysia at 2023 SEA Games. Unfortunately, he suffered a left Achilles tendon rupture in training on April 10 and underwent surgery the following day. He was expected to be out for six to nine months after the surgery. The injury forced him to withdraw from the SEA Games.

Hoh played his first international tournament since the injury at the 2023 Syed Modi International in November.

=== 2024 ===
In January, Hoh was selected to represent Malaysia at 2024 Asia Team Championships. Unfortunately, he had picked up a knee injury and was replaced for the tournament.

In April, he was included in Malaysia's squad for 2024 Thomas Cup in Chengdu, China. The team clinched bronze after losing to China in the semi-finals.

At the Slovenia Open in May, he was crowned champion after beating Indonesian Prahdiska Bagas Shujiwo 19–21, 21–11, 21–15.

In July, Hoh finished as the runner-up at the Northern Marianas Open. He then reached the final of Saipan International the following week where he clinched his second title of the year.

=== 2025 ===
In 2025, Hoh competed at the SEA Games in Thailand, where he won a silver medal in the team event and a bronze in the men's singles.

== Achievements ==
=== Southeast Asian Games ===
Men's singles
Year	Venue	Opponent	Score	Result	Ref.
2025	Gymnasium 4, Thammasat University; Pathum Thani, Thailand	(Indonesia) Alwi Farhan	10–21, 21–15, 14–21	Bronze	

=== BWF World Tour (1 runner-up) ===
The BWF World Tour, which was announced on 19 March 2017 and implemented in 2018, is a series of elite badminton tournaments sanctioned by the Badminton World Federation (BWF). The BWF World Tours are divided into levels of World Tour Finals, Super 1000, Super 750, Super 500, Super 300, and the BWF Tour Super 100.

Men's singles
Year	Tournament	Level	Opponent	Score	Result	Ref.
2025	Macau Open	Super 300	(Indonesia) Alwi Farhan	15–21, 5–21	(silver) Runner-up	

=== International Challenge / Series (6 titles, 2 runners-up) ===
Men's singles
Year	Tournament	Opponent	Score	Result
2022	Bonn International	(Chinese Taipei) Su Li-yang	21–19, 21–17	(gold) Winner
2022	Croatia Open	(Vietnam) Nguyễn Hải Đăng	21–15, 16–21, 21–18	(gold) Winner
2022	Malaysia International	(Malaysia) Aidil Sholeh	18–21, 21–16, 21–17	(gold) Winner
2023	Iran Fajr International	(Indonesia) Syabda Perkasa Belawa	21–18, 12–21, 20–22	(silver) Runner-up
2023	Uganda International	(India) Kanishq Mamillapalli	21–8, 21–12	(gold) Winner
2024	Slovenia Open	(Indonesia) Prahdiska Bagas Shujiwo	19–21, 21–11, 21–15	(gold) Winner
2024	Northern Marianas Open	(Chinese Taipei) Cheng Kai	12–21, 20–22	(silver) Runner-up
2024	Saipan International	(Japan) Ryoma Muramoto	21–16, 21–18	(gold) Winner

BWF International Challenge tournament
BWF International Series tournament
BWF Future Series tournament

=== Junior International (3 titles, 1 runner-up) ===
Boys' singles
Year	Tournament	Opponent	Score	Result
2022	India Junior International	(India) Pranay Shettigar	21–18, 21–14	(gold) Winner

Boys' doubles
Year	Tournament	Partner	Opponent	Score	Result
2019	Malaysia Junior	(Malaysia) Fazriq Razif	(Malaysia) Ooi Jhy Dar (Malaysia) Yap Roy King	14–21, 14–21	(silver) Runner-up
2019	Bangladesh Junior	(Malaysia) Fazriq Razif	(Malaysia) Eogene Ewe (Malaysia) Ong Zhen Yi	13–21, 22–20, 21–12	(gold) Winner
2021	Finnish Junior	(Malaysia) Ong Zhen Yi	(Malaysia) Fazriq Razif (Malaysia) Wong Vin Sean	23–21, 17–21, 21–18	(gold) Winner

BWF Junior International Grand Prix tournament
BWF Junior International Challenge tournament
BWF Junior International Series tournament
BWF Junior Future Series tournament
