= 2023 Syed Modi International =

Badminton tournament in India

Tournament details
- Dates: 28 November – 3 December
- Edition: 12th
- Level: Super 300
- Total prize money: US$210,000
- Venue: Babu Banarasi Das Indoor Stadium
- Location: Lucknow, India

Champions
- Men's singles: (Chinese Taipei) Chi Yu-jen
- Women's singles: (Japan) Nozomi Okuhara
- Men's doubles: (Malaysia) Choong Hon Jian (Malaysia) Muhammad Haikal
- Women's doubles: (Japan) Rin Iwanaga (Japan) Kie Nakanishi
- Mixed doubles: (Indonesia) Dejan Ferdinansyah (Indonesia) Gloria Emanuelle Widjaja

The 2023 Syed Modi International (officially known as the Syed Modi India International 2023) was a badminton tournament that took place at Babu Banarasi Das Indoor Stadium in Lucknow, India, from 28 November to 3 December 2023 and had a total prize of $210,000.

== Tournament ==
The 2023 Syed Modi International was the thirty-fourth tournament of the 2023 BWF World Tour and was also part of the Syed Modi International championships, which have been held since 2009. This tournament was organized by the Badminton Association of India with sanction from the BWF.

=== Venue ===
This international tournament was held at Babu Banarasi Das Indoor Stadium in Lucknow, India.

=== Point distribution ===
Below is the point distribution table for each phase of the tournament based on the BWF points system for the BWF World Tour Super 300 event.

Winner	Runner-up	3/4	5/8	9/16	17/32	33/64	65/128
7,000	5,950	4,900	3,850	2,750	1,670	660	320

=== Prize pool ===
The total prize money is US$210,000 with the distribution of the prize money in accordance with BWF regulations.

Event	Winner	Finalist	Semi-finals	Quarter-finals	Last 16
Singles	$15,750	$7,980	$3,045	$1,260	$735
Doubles	$16,590	$7,980	$2,940	$1,522.5	$787.5

== Men's singles ==
=== Seeds ===
1. (India) Prannoy H. S. (withdrew)
2. (Japan) Kenta Nishimoto (final)
3. (Chinese Taipei) Chou Tien-chen (first round)
4. (India) Lakshya Sen (withdrew)
5. (Chinese Taipei) Lin Chun-yi (quarter-finals)
6. (India) Srikanth Kidambi (first round)
7. (France) Toma Junior Popov (withdrew)
8. (Denmark) Rasmus Gemke (withdrew)

=== Finals ===
Semi-finals
(India) Priyanshu Rajawat	21	14	17
(Chinese Taipei) Chi Yu-jen	18	21	21
(France) Alex Lanier	17	21	17
2	(Japan) Kenta Nishimoto	21	13	21

Final
(Chinese Taipei) Chi Yu-jen	20	21	21
2	(Japan) Kenta Nishimoto	22	12	17

=== Top half ===
==== Section 1 ====
First round
PFQ	(Malaysia) Aidil S	17	12
Q2	(Indonesia) A Farhan	21	21
(Malaysia) Leong J H	13	17
(Malaysia) J Hoh	21	21
PFQ	(India) S Karunakaran	21	21
(Chinese Taipei) Huang Y-k	8	13
(Kazakhstan) D Panarin	17	19
(India) P Rajawat	21	21

Second round
Q2	(Indonesia) A Farhan	21	23
(Malaysia) J Hoh	11	21
PFQ	(India) S Karunakaran	18	6^{r}
(India) P Rajawat	21	11

Quarter-finals
Q2	(Indonesia) A Farhan	15	16
(India) P Rajawat	21	21

==== Section 2 ====
First round
PFQ	(Singapore) J Teh	15	16
(Chinese Taipei) Chi Y-j	21	21
(Indonesia) S H Rhustavito	21	21	9
(Malaysia) Cheam J W	23	15	21
6	(India) S Kidambi	21	8
(Chinese Taipei) Lee C-h	23	21
Q3	(India) C Sen	16	21	13
(India) K George	21	14	21

Second round
(Chinese Taipei) Chi Y-j	17	21	21
(Malaysia) Cheam J W	21	11	17
(Chinese Taipei) Lee C-h	21	18	22
(India) K George	16	21	20

Quarter-finals
(Chinese Taipei) Chi Y-j	21	13	21
(Chinese Taipei) Lee C-h	12	21	13

=== Bottom half ===
==== Section 3 ====
First round
(Chinese Taipei) Wang T-w	21	7	21
PFQ	(India) S Verma	9	21	17
Q1	(India) M L Maisnam	14	15
PFQ	(Malaysia) Soong J V	21	21
(India) M Manjunath	16	14
(France) A Lanier	21	21
(Denmark) M Christophersen	21	21
3	(Chinese Taipei) Chou T-c	19	17

Second round
(Chinese Taipei) Wang T-w	19	13
PFQ	(Malaysia) Soong J V	21	21
(France) A Lanier	21	18	21
(Denmark) M Christophersen	18	21	15

Quarter-finals
PFQ	(Malaysia) Soong J V	16	17
(France) A Lanier	21	21

==== Section 4 ====
First round
(France) A Merklé	21	21
(India) S Subramanian	12	19
(Thailand) K Wangcharoen	18	21	9
5	(Chinese Taipei) Lin C-y	21	15	21
Q4	(Chinese Taipei) Kuo K-l	21	5	21
(Chinese Taipei) Su L-y	18	21	16
(India) B. Sai Praneeth	17	15
2	(Japan) K Nishimoto	21	21

Second round
(France) A Merkle	11	22	16
5	(Chinese Taipei) Lin C-y	21	20	21
Q4	(Chinese Taipei) Kuo K-l	19	10
2	(Japan) K Nishimoto	21	21

Quarter-finals
5	(Chinese Taipei) Lin C-y	10	10
2	(Japan) K Nishimoto	21	21

== Women's singles ==
=== Seeds ===
1. (Thailand) Pornpawee Chochuwong (withdrew)
2. (Thailand) Supanida Katethong (withdrew)
3. (Japan) Aya Ohori (semi-finals)
4. (Thailand) Busanan Ongbamrungphan (withdrew)
5. (Denmark) Line Kjærsfeldt (final)
6. (Chinese Taipei) Hsu Wen-chi (semi-finals)
7. (Denmark) Line Christophersen (quarter-finals)
8. (Chinese Taipei) Sung Shuo-yun (quarter-finals)

=== Finals ===
Semi-finals
(Japan) Nozomi Okuhara	21	22
3	(Japan) Aya Ohori	19	20
6	(Chinese Taipei) Hsu Wen-chi	21	17	16
5	(Denmark) Line Kjærsfeldt	14	21	21

Final
(Japan) Nozomi Okuhara	21	21
5	(Denmark) Line Kjærsfeldt	19	16

=== Top half ===
==== Section 1 ====
First round
PFQ	(India) U Hooda	15	21	21
(India) A Kashyap	21	19	18
(Japan) N Okuhara	18	21	21
(India) M Bansod	21	17	10
8	(Chinese Taipei) Sung S-y	21	21
Q4	(India) K Mopati	8	16
(Denmark) A Schulz	21	15	9
(India) A Upadhyaya	14	21	21

Second round
PFQ	(India) U Hooda	9	13
(Japan) N Okuhara	21	21
8	(Chinese Taipei) Sung S-y	21	21
(India) A Upadhyaya	16	17

Quarter-finals
(Japan) N Okuhara	21	21
8	(Chinese Taipei) Sung S-y	14	11

==== Section 2 ====
First round
3	(Japan) A Ohori	24	21
(Malaysia) Kisona S	22	13
(India) A Chaliha	21	21
(Ukraine) P Buhrova	15	15
7	(Denmark) L Christophersen	21	21
Q2	(India) A Variyath	10	10
(Denmark) J D Jakobsen	21	8	21
(Chinese Taipei) Lin H-t	13	21	13

Second round
3	(Japan) A Ohori	21	21
(India) A Chaliha	7	13
7	(Denmark) L Christophersen	21	21
(Denmark) J D Jakobsen	16	13

Quarter-finals
3	(Japan) A Ohori	21	21
7	(Denmark) L Christophersen	15	16

=== Bottom half ===
==== Section 3 ====
First round
PFQ	(Japan) T Miyazaki	21	21
(Thailand) P Choeikeewong	18	13
(India) T Hemanth	15	8
6	(Chinese Taipei) Hsu W-c	21	21
Q3	(United States) S Gurazada	9	15
(Malaysia) Wong L C	21	21
Q1	(India) J Ananthakumar	24	21
PFQ	(Chinese Taipei) Lin S-y	22	7

Second round
PFQ	(Japan) T Miyazaki	9	14
6	(Chinese Taipei) Hsu W-c	21	21
(Malaysia) Wong L C	21	21
Q1	(India) J Ananthakumar	15	12

Quarter-finals
6	(Chinese Taipei) Hsu W-c	19	21	21
(Malaysia) Wong L C	21	17	15

==== Section 4 ====
First round
(Malaysia) Letshanaa K	21	21
(Australia) T Ho	16	13
(India) T Mir	15	15
5	(Denmark) L Kjærsfeldt	21	21
(Thailand) L Chaiwan	21	21
(Chinese Taipei) Huang C-p	18	15
(Israel) K Polikarpova	14	14
PFQ	(India) Gadde R S	21	21

Second round
(Malaysia) Letshanaa K	18	12
5	(Denmark) L Kjærsfeldt	21	21
(Thailand) L Chaiwan	21	21
PFQ	(India) Gadde R S	8	12

Quarter-finals
5	(Denmark) L Kjærsfeldt	13	21	21
(Thailand) L Chaiwan	21	13	18

== Men's doubles ==
=== Seeds ===
1. (Japan) Akira Koga / Taichi Saito (final)
2. (England) Ben Lane / Sean Vendy (semi-finals)
3. (Denmark) Rasmus Kjær / Frederik Søgaard (semi-finals)
4. (Germany) Mark Lamsfuß / Marvin Seidel (second round)
5. (France) Lucas Corvée / Ronan Labar (second round)
6. (Japan) Kenya Mitsuhashi / Hiroki Okamura (first round)
7. (Denmark) Daniel Lundgaard / Mads Vestergaard (first round)
8. (France) Christo Popov / Toma Junior Popov (withdrew)

=== Finals ===
Semi-finals
1	(Japan) Akira Koga (Japan) Taichi Saito	18	21	21
3	(Denmark) Rasmus Kjær (Denmark) Frederik Søgaard	21	15	16
(Malaysia) Choong Hon Jian (Malaysia) Muhammad Haikal	21	21
2	(England) Ben Lane (England) Sean Vendy	12	19

Final
1	(Japan) Akira Koga (Japan) Taichi Saito	21	18	16
(Malaysia) Choong Hon Jian (Malaysia) Muhammad Haikal	18	21	21

=== Top half ===
==== Section 1 ====
First round
1	(Japan) A Koga (Japan) T Saito	21	26
(Malaysia) Boon X Y (Malaysia) Goh V S	17	24
Q4	(India) P Ranade (India) Z Seyie	14	18
Q3	(India) A Makhija (India) V G Prasad	21	21
7	(Denmark) D Lundgaard (Denmark) M Vestergaard	12	12
(Denmark) W K Boe (Denmark) C F Kjær	21	21
(Thailand) P Sukphun (Thailand) P Teeraratsakul	18	23	17
(Thailand) P Kaosamaang (Thailand) W Thongsa-nga	21	21	21

Second round
1	(Japan) A Koga (Japan) T Saito	21	21
(India) A Makhija (India) V G Prasad	9	8
(Denmark) W K Boe (Denmark) C F Kjaer	21	21
(Thailand) P Kaosamaang (Thailand) W Thongsa-nga	14	17

Quarter-finals
1	(Japan) A Koga (Japan) T Saito	21	21
(Denmark) W K Boe (Denmark) C F Kjaer	15	17

==== Section 2 ====
First round
3	(Denmark) R Kjær (Denmark) F Søgaard	21	21
(Chinese Taipei) Wei C-w (Chinese Taipei) Wu G-x	16	12
Q1	(India) D Rawat (India) C Sen	21	21
(India) A R Doddavarapu (India) V Veeramreddy	19	18
5	(France) L Corvée (France) R Labar	21	21
(Indonesia) R Fadillah (Indonesia) M F Gideon	17	14
(Chinese Taipei) Chiang C-w (Chinese Taipei) Wu H-y	21	21
(Malaysia) Low H Y (Malaysia) Ng E C	18	19

Second round
3	(Denmark) R Kjaer (Denmark) F Søgaard	21	21
Q1	(India) D Rawat (India) C Sen	18	15
5	(France) L Corvee (France) R Labar	14	18
(Chinese Taipei) Chiang C-w (Chinese Taipei) Wu H-y	21	21

Quarter-finals
3	(Denmark) R Kjaer (Denmark) F Søgaard	21	19	21
(Chinese Taipei) Chiang C-w (Chinese Taipei) Wu H-y	18	21	17

=== Bottom half ===
==== Section 3 ====
First round
(Malaysia) J Arif (Malaysia) Yap R K	22	21
Q2	(Japan) H Midorikawa (Japan) K Yamashita	20	18
(India) H Amsakarunan (India) R K Rethinasabapathi	19	21	21
PFQ	(India) A Agarwal (India) N Kumar	21	18	11
(Japan) T Aizawa (Japan) Y Noda	20	21	13
(Malaysia) Choong H J (Malaysia) M Haikal	22	15	21
(India) D Kapila (India) V G Panjala	11	16
4	(Germany) M Lamsfuß (Germany) M Seidel	21	21

Second round
(Malaysia) J Arif (Malaysia) Yap R K	21	21
(India) H Amsakarunan (India) R K Rethinasabapathi	6	17
(Malaysia) Choong H J (Malaysia) M Haikal	11	25	21
4	(Germany) M Lamsfuß (Germany) M Seidel	21	23	10

Quarter-finals
(Malaysia) J Arif (Malaysia) Yap R K
(Malaysia) Choong H J (Malaysia) M Haikal	w	/	o

==== Section 4 ====
First round
(Chinese Taipei) Chen Z-r (Chinese Taipei) Lu C	16	21	21
(India) P. S. Ravikrishna (India) S P Udayakumar	21	15	13
(Chinese Taipei) Lin B-w (Chinese Taipei) Su C-h	22	21	21
6	(Japan) K Mitsuhashi (Japan) H Okamura	24	10	19
(India) K P Garaga (India) K S Pratheek	16	12
(Thailand) P Thongkham (Thailand) W Thongkham	21	21
(Chinese Taipei) Lin Y-c (Chinese Taipei) Su L-w	14	21	17
2	(England) B Lane (England) S Vendy	21	18	21

Second round
(Chinese Taipei) Chen Z-r (Chinese Taipei) Lu C	21	15	15
(Chinese Taipei) Lin B-w (Chinese Taipei) Su C-h	15	21	21
(Thailand) P Thongkam (Thailand) W Thongkam	7	14
2	(England) B Lane (England) S Vendy	21	21

Quarter-finals
(Chinese Taipei) Lin B-w (Chinese Taipei) Su C-h	21	21	26
2	(England) B Lane (England) S Vendy	16	23	28

== Women's doubles ==
=== Seeds ===
1. (Japan) Yuki Fukushima / Sayaka Hirota (semi-finals)
2. (Japan) Nami Matsuyama / Chiharu Shida (withdrew)
3. (Japan) Rin Iwanaga / Kie Nakanishi (champions)
4. (India) Treesa Jolly / Gayatri Gopichand (quarter-finals)
5. (Chinese Taipei) Lee Chia-hsin / Teng Chun-hsun (quarter-finals)
6. (France) Margot Lambert / Anne Tran (withdrew)
7. (India) Tanisha Crasto / Ashwini Ponnappa (final)
8. (Germany) Linda Efler / Isabel Lohau (quarter-finals)

=== Finals ===
Semi-finals
1	(Japan) Yuki Fukushima (Japan) Sayaka Hirota	11^{r}
7	(India) Tanisha Crasto (India) Ashwini Ponnappa	10
3	(Japan) Rin Iwanaga (Japan) Kie Nakanishi	17	21	21
(Australia) Setyana Mapasa (Australia) Angela Yu	21	17	15

Final
7	(India) Tanisha Crasto (India) Ashwini Ponnappa	14	21	15
3	(Japan) Rin Iwanaga (Japan) Kie Nakanishi	21	17	21

=== Top half ===
==== Section 1 ====
First round
1	(Japan) Y Fukushima (Japan) S Hirota	21	21
(India) P Konjengbam (India) S Mishra	11	13
(India) P Arora (India) U Hooda	16	14
(Chinese Taipei) Sung S-y (Chinese Taipei) Yu C-h	21	21
8	(Germany) L Efler (Germany) I Lohau	21	21
PFQ	(India) A Kandula (India) V Khadkekar	8	10
Q1	(India) I Malik (India) T Malik	16	9
(India) S Singhi (India) R Thaker	21	21

Second round
1	(Japan) Y Fukushima (Japan) S Hirota	21	21
(Chinese Taipei) Sung S-y (Chinese Taipei) Yu C-h	11	11
8	(Germany) L Efler (Germany) I Lohau	21	21
(India) S Singhi (India) R Thaker	13	11

Quarter-finals
1	(Japan) Y Fukushima (Japan) S Hirota	21	21
8	(Germany) L Efler (Germany) I Lohau	9	12

==== Section 2 ====
First round
4	(India) T Jolly (India) G Gopichand	21	21
(India) A Gahlawat (India) S Gahlawat	9	16
Q4	(India) G R Jaiswal (India) S Sikkandar	18	21	13
(India) D Nandakumar (India) R K Toor	21	10	21
7	(India) T Crasto (India) A Ponnappa	21	21
Q2	(India) Sam Singh (India) Son Singh	8	9
Q3	(India) S Gupta (India) Sau Singh	6	13
(India) R Panda (India) S Panda	21	21

Second round
4	(India) T Jolly (India) G Gopichand	21	21
(India) D Nandakumar (India) R K Toor	9	5
7	(India) T Crasto (India) A Ponnappa	22	17	21
(India) R Panda (India) S Panda	20	21	16

Quarter-finals
4	(India) T Jolly (India) G Gopichand	19	8
7	(India) T Crasto (India) A Ponnappa	21	21

=== Bottom half ===
==== Section 3 ====
First round
PFQ	(India) S S S Lakkamraju (India) A A Pai	14	9
(Chinese Taipei) Chang C-h (Chinese Taipei) Yang C-t	21	21
PFQ	(Malaysia) Go P K (Malaysia) Low Y Y	17	11
5	(Chinese Taipei) Lee C-h (Chinese Taipei) Teng C-h	21	21
(Uganda) H Kobugabe (Uganda) G Mbabazi	13	9
(Chinese Taipei) Wang S-m (Chinese Taipei) Wu M-c	21	21
PFQ	(India) K Gupta (India) D Singh	3	9
3	(Japan) R Iwanaga (Japan) K Nakanishi	21	21

Second round
(Chinese Taipei) Chang C-h (Chinese Taipei) Yang C-t	10	13
5	(Chinese Taipei) Lee C-h (Chinese Taipei) Teng C-h	21	21
(Chinese Taipei) Wang S-m (Chinese Taipei) Wu M-c	7	13
3	(Japan) R Iwanaga (Japan) K Nakanishi	21	21

Quarter-finals
5	(Chinese Taipei) Lee C-h (Chinese Taipei) Teng C-h	15	21	14
3	(Japan) R Iwanaga (Japan) K Nakanishi	21	19	21

==== Section 4 ====
First round
(India) K A Bhat (India) S Gautam	21	21
(India) Nik Rapria (India) Nis Rapria	9	5
(Chinese Taipei) N G Chan (Chinese Taipei) Yang C-y	17	21	12
PFQ	(Japan) H Osawa (Japan) A Sato	21	15	21
(Thailand) L Kanlaha (Thailand) P Muenwong	21	21
(Japan) M Shigeta (Japan) M Taguchi	18	13
(Australia) S Mapasa (Australia) A Yu	21	21
PFQ	(India) A B Radhakrishnan (India) V Viswanath Sri	14	9

Second round
(India) K A Bhat (India) S Gautam	11	18
PFQ	(Japan) H Osawa (Japan) A Sato	21	21
(Thailand) L Kanlaha (Thailand) P Muenwong	18	12
(Australia) S Mapasa (Australia) A Yu	21	21

Quarter-finals
PFQ	(Japan) H Osawa (Japan) A Sato	14	18
(Australia) S Mapasa (Australia) A Yu	21	21

== Mixed doubles ==
=== Seeds ===
1. (Japan) Hiroki Midorikawa / Natsu Saito (first round)
2. (Indonesia) Dejan Ferdinansyah / Gloria Emanuelle Widjaja (champions)
3. (Japan) Kyohei Yamashita / Naru Shinoya (quarter-finals)
4. (Malaysia) Tan Kian Meng / Lai Pei Jing (withdrew)
5. (Japan) Yuki Kaneko / Misaki Matsutomo (final)
6. (Indonesia) Praveen Jordan / Melati Daeva Oktavianti (second round)
7. (Singapore) Terry Hee / Jessica Tan (quarter-finals)
8. (England) Marcus Ellis / Lauren Smith (second round)

=== Finals ===
Semi-finals
(Malaysia) Hoo Pang Ron (Malaysia) Cheng Su Yin	21	5	17
5	(Japan) Yuki Kaneko (Japan) Misaki Matsutomo	17	21	21
(Germany) Mark Lamsfuß (Germany) Isabel Lohau	19	21	20
2	(Indonesia) Dejan Ferdinansyah (Indonesia) Gloria Emanuelle Widjaja	21	19	22

Final
5	(Japan) Yuki Kaneko (Japan) Misaki Matsutomo	22	19	23
2	(Indonesia) Dejan Ferdinansyah (Indonesia) Gloria Emanuelle Widjaja	20	21	25

=== Top half ===
==== Section 1 ====
First round
1	(Japan) H Midorikawa (Japan) N Saito	11	23
(Malaysia) Hoo P R (Malaysia) Cheng S Y	21	25
Q2	(India) N Kumar (India) N Manglam	21	21
(India) T Kona (India) S K P Kudaravalli	14	15
8	(England) M Ellis (England) L Smith	21	21
Q1	(India) F S Aman (India) A Karandikar	16	13
(Chinese Taipei) Chang K-c (Chinese Taipei) Lee C-c	21	21
(India) Nithin H. V. (India) A A Pai	17	13

Second round
(Malaysia) Hoo P R (Malaysia) Cheng S Y	21	21
Q2	(India) N Kumar (India) N Manglam	13	13
8	(England) M Ellis (England) L Smith	21	14	19
(Chinese Taipei) Chang K-c (Chinese Taipei) Lee C-c	13	21	21

Quarter-finals
(Malaysia) Hoo P R (Malaysia) Cheng S Y	23	21
(Chinese Taipei) Chang K-c (Chinese Taipei) Lee C-c	21	15

==== Section 2 ====
First round
3	(Japan) K Yamashita (Japan) N Shinoya	21	21
(India) S Karunakaran (India) A Variyath	14	16
(Chinese Taipei) Wu H-y (Chinese Taipei) Yang C-y	14	14
(India) B S Reddy (India) N S Reddy	21	21
5	(Japan) Y Kaneko (Japan) M Matsutomo	21	21
(Malaysia) Choong H J (Malaysia) Go P K	17	13
(Malaysia) Chan P S (Malaysia) Cheah Y S	12	18
(India) R Kapoor (India) A Ponnappa	21	21

Second round
3	(Japan) K Yamashita (Japan) N Shinoya	21	21
(India) B S Reddy (India) N S Reddy	9	17
5	(Japan) Y Kaneko (Japan) M Matsutomo	21	21
(India) R Kapoor (India) A Ponnappa	14	14

Quarter-finals
3	(Japan) K Yamashita (Japan) N Shinoya	18	21	16
5	(Japan) Y Kaneko (Japan) M Matsutomo	21	16	21

=== Bottom half ===
==== Section 3 ====
First round
(Thailand) R Oupthong (Thailand) J Sudjaipraparat	27	19	21
(Denmark) M Vestergaard (Denmark) C Busch	25	21	18
(Chinese Taipei) Lin B-w (Chinese Taipei) Wang S-m	7	16
6	(Indonesia) P Jordan (Indonesia) M D Oktavianti	21	21
(Australia) K Choo (Australia) G Somerville	19	21	19
(Chinese Taipei) Chen Z-r (Chinese Taipei) Yang C-t	21	17	21
(Germany) M Lamsfuß (Germany) I Lohau	21	21
PFQ	(India) D S Konthoujam (India) P Konjengbam	12	13

Second round
(Thailand) R Oupthong (Thailand) J Sudjaipraparat	21	21
6	(Indonesia) P Jordan (Indonesia) M D Oktavianti	19	15
(Chinese Taipei) Chen Z-r (Chinese Taipei) Yang C-t	22	16
(Germany) M Lamsfuß (Germany) I Lohau	24	21

Quarter-finals
(Thailand) R Oupthong (Thailand) J Sudjaipraparat	18	20
(Germany) M Lamsfuß (Germany) I Lohau	21	22

==== Section 4 ====
First round
Q3	(India) S Sharma (India) P S Ram	13	10
(Malaysia) Yap R K (Malaysia) V Siow	21	21
(India) D Kapila (India) T Crasto	16	21	18
7	(Singapore) T Hee (Singapore) J Tan	21	18	21
(Chinese Taipei) Wei C-w (Chinese Taipei) N G Chan	21	21
Q4	(Chinese Taipei) Chiang C-w (Chinese Taipei) Wu M-c	14	13
(Thailand) P Teeraratsakul (Thailand) P Muenwong	11	21	16
2	(Indonesia) D Ferdinansyah (Indonesia) G E Widjaja	21	17	21

Second round
(Malaysia) Yap R K (Malaysia) V Siow	21	17	15
7	(Singapore) T Hee (Singapore) J Tan	16	21	21
(Chinese Taipei) Wei C-w (Chinese Taipei) N G Chan	21	17	11
2	(Indonesia) D Ferdinansyah (Indonesia) G E Widjaja	19	21	21

Quarter-finals
7	(Singapore) T Hee (Singapore) J Tan	14	15
2	(Indonesia) D Ferdinansyah (Indonesia) G E Widjaja	21	21

Preceded by 2022 Syed Modi International	Syed Modi International	Succeeded by 2024 Syed Modi International
Preceded by 2023 China Masters	BWF World Tour; 2023 BWF season	Succeeded by 2023 Guwahati Masters
