= 2022 Odisha Open =

2022 badminton tournament in Odisha

Tournament details
- Dates: 25–30 January
- Level: Super 100
- Total prize money: US$75,000
- Venue: Jawaharlal Nehru Indoor Stadium
- Location: Cuttack, Odisha, India

Champions
- Men's singles: (India) Kiran George
- Women's singles: (India) Unnati Hooda
- Men's doubles: (Malaysia) Nur Mohd Azriyn Ayub (Malaysia) Lim Khim Wah
- Women's doubles: (India) Gayatri Gopichand (India) Treesa Jolly
- Mixed doubles: (Sri Lanka) Sachin Dias (Sri Lanka) Thilini Hendahewa

The 2022 Odisha Open was a BWF Super 100 tournament that took place at the Jawaharlal Nehru Indoor Stadium, Cuttack, Odisha, India from 25 to 30 January 2022. It had a total prize pool of US$75,000.

== Tournament ==
The 2022 Odisha Open was the third tournament and the first Super 100 tournament of the 2022 BWF World Tour. It was the first edition of the Odisha Open. The tournament was organized by the Badminton Association of India with sanction from the Badminton World Federation.

=== Venue ===
This international tournament was held at the Jawaharlal Nehru Indoor Stadium in Cuttack, Odisha, India.

=== Point distribution ===
Below is the point distribution table for each phase of the tournament based on the BWF points system for the BWF Tour Super 100 event.

Winner	Runner-up	3/4	5/8	9/16	17/32	33/64	65/128	129/256
5,500	4,680	3,850	3,030	2,110	1,290	510	240	100

=== Prize money ===
The total prize money for this tournament was US$75,000. The distribution of the prize money was in accordance with BWF regulations.

Event	Winner	Finalist	Semi-finals	Quarter-finals	Last 16
Singles	$5,625	$2,850	$1,087.50	$450	$262.50
Doubles	$5,925	$2,850	$1,050	$543.75	$281.25

== Men's singles ==
=== Seeds ===
1. (India) Parupalli Kashyap (withdrew)
2. (India) Sourabh Verma (withdrew)
3. (India) Subhankar Dey (quarter-finals)
4. (India) Ajay Jayaram (withdrew)
5. (Finland) Kalle Koljonen (withdrew)
6. (Canada) Xiaodong Sheng (second round)
7. (Malaysia) Cheam June Wei (third round)
8. (Azerbaijan) Ade Resky Dwicahyo (withdrew)

=== Finals ===
Semi-finals
(India) Kaushal Dharmamer	17	14
(India) Priyanshu Rajawat	21	21
(India) Kiran George	19	21	21
(India) Ansal Yadav	21	12	14

Final
(India) Priyanshu Rajawat	15	21	18
(India) Kiran George	21	14	21

=== Top half ===
==== Section 1 ====
First Round
(Sri Lanka) B Goonethilleka	18	21	19
PFQ	(India) A Singh	21	17	21
PFQ	(India) N S Iyer	12	21	19
PFQ	(India) Tu Laa	21	19	21
(India) K Dharmamer	21	21
(India) S S M Subramanian	13	16
PFQ	(India) A S K Nair	w	/	o
Q7

Second Round
PFQ	(India) A Hari	21	10
PFQ	(India) A Singh	23	21
(India) A Saini	12	21	21
PFQ	(India) Tu Laa	21	18	13
PFQ	(India) Gurusaidutt R. M. V.	13	17
(India) K Dharmamer	21	21
(India) K K Mekala	21	12	21
PFQ	(India) A S K Nair	14	21	11

Third Round
PFQ	(India) A Singh	18	21	21
(India) A Saini	21	17	18
(India) K Dharmamer	21	21
(India) K K Mekala	15	6

Quarter-finals
PFQ	(India) A Singh	21	18	18
(India) K Dharmamer	14	21	21

==== Section 2 ====
First Round
(India) S Karunakaran	w	/	o
Q4
PFQ	(India) D Rawat	19	14
Q3	(India) P R Gandham	21	21
Q8	(India) E Sukumar	21	21
Q1	(Zambia) C E Mulenga	11	4
(India) K Gulshan Kumar	21	21
PFQ	(India) H M Gowda	7	17

Second Round
PFQ	(India) V Vasudevan	7	23	9
(India) S Karunakaran	21	21	21
(India) P Rajawat	18	21	21
Q3	(India) P R Gandham	21	14	13
7	(Malaysia) Cheam J W	21	21
Q8	(India) E Sukumar	15	15
(India) M Manjunath	15	21	21
(India) K Gulshan Kumar	21	17	15

Third Round
(India) S Karunakaran	13	12
(India) P Rajawat	21	21
7	(Malaysia) Cheam J W	11	18
(India) M Manjunath	21	21

Quarter-finals
(India) P Rajawat	13	21	21
(India) M Manjunath	21	14	8

=== Bottom half ===
==== Section 3 ====
First Round
PFQ	(India) R Sanjeevi	21	21
Q5	(India) S Dalal	10	16
(India) C Sen	21	21
(India) V Kapur	18	15
(Zambia) K Mulenga	15	9
(India) S Jaiswal	21	21
PFQ	(India) A Kale	20	11
PFQ	(India) J Kalaga	22	21

Second Round
PFQ	(India) R Sanjeevi	18	18
(India) K George	21	21
(India) C Sen	21	21
PFQ	(India) Ravi	14	19
(India) S Jaiswal	8	14
(India) R Y Chittaboina	21	21
PFQ	(India) J Kalaga	18	10
3	(India) S Dey	21	21

Third Round
(India) K George	21	21
(India) C Sen	12	13
(India) R Y Chittaboina	16	14
3	(India) S Dey	21	21

Quarter-finals
(India) K George	21	10	21
3	(India) S Dey	16	21	19

==== Section 4 ====
First Round
PFQ	(India) Bhargav S	19	19
PFQ	(India) Ta Laa	21	21
Q6
(India) S Pratap Singh	w	/	o
(India) H Dani	12	3^{r}
Q2	(India) T Mannepalli	21	9
(India) M L Maisnam	21	21
PFQ	(India) S Mohan	14	6

Second Round
PFQ	(India) Ta Laa	16	18
(India) A Yadav	21	21
(India) S Pratap Singh	21	21
6	(Canada) XD Sheng	17	4
Q2	(India) T Mannepalli	10	21	21
PFQ	(India) S Gupta	21	14	19
(India) M L Maisnam	21	21
PFQ	(India) S V Pullela	15	19

Third Round
(India) A Yadav	17	21	21
(India) S Pratap Singh	21	18	12
Q2	(India) T Mannepalli	21	21
(India) M L Maisnam	18	17

Quarter-finals
(India) A Yadav	21	23
Q2	(India) T Mannepalli	15	21

== Women's singles ==
=== Seeds ===
1. (India) Saina Nehwal (withdrew)
2. (Thailand) Supanida Katethong (withdrew)
3. (India) Aarkarshi Kashyap (withdrew)
4. (Myanmar) Thet Htar Thuzar (withdrew)
5. (India) Ashmita Chaliha (semi-finals)
6. (Singapore) Jaslyn Hooi (withdrew)
7. (India) Mugdha Agrey (withdrew)
8. (United States) Disha Gupta (second round)

=== Finals ===
Semi-finals
(India) Smit Toshniwal	21	10	21
5	(India) Ashmita Chaliha	19	21	17
PFQ	(India) Unnati Hooda	24	24
(India) Malvika Bansod	22	22

Final
(India) Smit Toshniwal	18	11
PFQ	(India) Unnati Hooda	21	21

=== Top half ===
==== Section 1 ====
First round
PFQ	(India) N Pandit	20	21	10
(India) S Toshniwal	22	18	21
PFQ	(India) A Praveen	21	21
(India) Gadde R S	12	8
PFQ	(United States) I Jaiswal	21	10	21
PFQ	(India) A Bhatt	19	21	13
PFQ	(India) D Singh	21	21
Q2	(India) J Ananthakumar	18	15

Second round
(India) S Toshniwal	21	21
(India) A Praveen	12	17
PFQ	(United States) I Jaiswal	18	27	21
PFQ	(India) D Singh	21	25	18

Quarter-finals
(India) S Toshniwal	8	21	21
PFQ	(United States) I Jaiswal	21	9	14

==== Section 2 ====
First round
PFQ	(India) K Bharadwaj
Q4	(India) N Rapria	w	/	o
PFQ	(India) TM Palli	13	7
PFQ	(India) R Sawant	21	21
5	(India) A Chaliha	21	12	21
(India) S U R Chukka	12	21	17
(India) A Upadhyaya	21	21
Q1	(India) Y Jakhar	12	12

Second round
Q4	(India) N Rapria	14	16
PFQ	(India) R Sawant	21	21
5	(India) A Chaliha	21	21
(India) A Upadhyaya	17	16

Quarter-finals
PFQ	(India) R Sawant	17	15
5	(India) A Chaliha	21	21

=== Bottom half ===
==== Section 3 ====
First round
(India) S Mundada
PFQ	(India) U Hooda	w	/	o
(India) P Neeluri
8	(United States) D Gupta	w	/	o
(India) S I Farooqui	21	21
(India) V Choudhari	19	19
(India) A Kumari	w	/	o
3	(India) A Kashyap

Second round
PFQ	(India) U Hooda	21	21
8	(United States) D Gupta	6	9
(India) S I Farooqui	21	21
(India) A Kumari	11	13

Quarter-finals
PFQ	(India) U Hooda	21	21
(India) S I Farooqui	10	15

==== Section 4 ====
First round
PFQ	(India) T Mir	13	21	21
(India) K Mopati	21	14	19
(India) M Bansod	21	21
PFQ	(India) S Gurazada	16	11
(India) T Hemanth	w	/	o
(India) K Kanwal
Q3	(India) V Harish	21	21
PFQ	(India) S Panwar	11	17

Second round
PFQ	(India) T Mir	13	15
(India) M Bansod	21	21
(India) T Hemanth	21	21
Q3	(India) V Harish	7	17

Quarter-finals
(India) M Bansod	21	16	21
(India) T Hemanth	13	21	17

== Men's doubles ==
=== Seeds ===
1. (Russia) Vladimir Ivanov / Ivan Sozonov (withdrew)
2. (India) Manu Attri / B. Sumeeth Reddy (withdrew)
3. (India) Arjun M. R. / Dhruv Kapila (withdrew)
4. (Malaysia) Man Wei Chong / Tee Kai Wun (withdrew)
5. (India) Krishna Prasad Garaga / Vishnuvardhan Goud Panjala (quarter-finals)
6. (Singapore) Terry Hee / Loh Kean Hean (withdrew)
7. (Norway) Torjus Flåten / Vegard Rikheim (withdrew)
8. (India) Tushar Sharma / Vinay Kumar Singh (quarter-finals)

=== Finals ===
Semi-finals
(India) Vasantha Kumar Hanumaiah Ranganatha (India) Ashith Surya	12	21	18
(India) P. S. Ravikrishna (India) Sankar Prasad Udayakumar	21	18	21
(Sri Lanka) Sachin Dias (Sri Lanka) Buwaneka Goonethilleka	21	18	17
(Malaysia) Nur Mohd Azriyn Ayub (Malaysia) Lim Khim Wah	15	21	21

Final
(India) P. S. Ravikrishna (India) Sankar Prasad Udayakumar	21	14	16
(Malaysia) Nur Mohd Azriyn Ayub (Malaysia) Lim Khim Wah	18	21	21

=== Top half ===
==== Section 1 ====
First round
PFQ	(India) J Dandu (India) T H N Babu	w	/	d
Q3	(India) A V Fallary (India) N Pandey	w	/	d
Q4
PFQ	(India) V Chaufla (India) V Chawat	w	/	d
PFQ	(India) A Makhija (India) V G Prasad	w	/	o
Q1
(India) V K Hanumaiah Ranganatha (India) A Surya	21	21
PFQ	(Zambia) C E Mulenga (Zambia) K Mulenga	18	15

Second round
PFQ	(India) A Makhija (India) V G Prasad
(India) V K Hanumaiah Ranganatha (India) A Surya	w	/	o

Quarter-finals
(India) V K Hanumaiah Ranganatha (India) A Surya	w	/	o

==== Section 2 ====
First round
PFQ	(India) V Ali (India) V Chauhan	w	/	o
PFQ	(India) S Choudhary (India) J Pant
(India) K Concheepuran Manivannan (India) S Gajendran	14	10
(India) P. S. Ravikrishna (India) S P Udayakumar	21	21
PFQ	(India) S Prasad (India) S. Sunjith Jr.	w	/	o
PFQ	(India) H Khatana (India) S Patel
(India) K Chahal (India) A Malik
PFQ	(India) B Chhabra (India) G Sahni	w	/	o

Second round
PFQ	(India) V Ali (India) V Chauhan	8	4
(India) P. S. Ravikrishna (India) S P Udayakumar	21	21
PFQ	(India) S Prasad (India) S. Sunjith Jr.	21	21
PFQ	(India) B Chhabra (India) G Sahni	14	8

Quarter-finals
(India) P. S. Ravikrishna (India) S P Udayakumar	21	21
PFQ	(India) S Prasad (India) S. Sunjith Jr.	18	18

=== Bottom half ===
==== Section 3 ====
First round
PFQ	(India) A R Doddavarapu (India) V H V R Veeramreddy	19	11
(India) M S Khwairakpam (India) D S Konthoujam	21	10^{r}
PFQ	(India) A Kongara (India) V Prasad
5	(India) K P Garaga (India) V G Panjala	w	/	o
(Sri Lanka) S Dias (Sri Lanka) B Goonethilleka	18	21	21
(India) I Bhatnagar (India) K. Sai Pratheek	21	18	14
(India) S V Govindarasu (India) G Venkadeshwaran	w	/	o
PFQ	(India) C Joshi (India) Mayank Rana

Second round
PFQ	(India) A R Doddavarapu (India) V H V R Veeramreddy	12	17
5	(India) K P Garaga (India) V G Panjala	21	21
(Sri Lanka) S Dias (Sri Lanka) B Goonethilleka	21	21
(India) S V Govindarasu (India) G Venkadeshwaran	16	14

Quarter-finals
5	(India) K P Garaga (India) V G Panjala	23	17	15
(Sri Lanka) S Dias (Sri Lanka) B Goonethilleka	21	21	21

==== Section 4 ====
First round
(India) P S Chouhan (India) R Verma
(India) Ravi (India) C Arora	w	/	o
Q2	(India) A Thakore (India) D Thakore
8	(India) T Sharma (India) V K Singh	w	/	o
(Malaysia) N M Azriyn A (Malaysia) Lim K W	21	21
(India) S Dalal (India) S Malik	16	18
PFQ	(India) H Ambekar (India) A Javadekar	w	/	d
PFQ	(India) T S Andavar (India) C Govindarajan	w	/	d

Second round
(India) Ravi (India) C Arora	20	14
8	(India) T Sharma (India) V K Singh	22	21
(Malaysia) N M Azriyn A (Malaysia) Lim K W	w	/	o

Quarter-finals
8	(India) T Sharma (India) V K Singh	18	16
(Malaysia) N M Azriyn A (Malaysia) Lim K W	21	21

== Women's doubles ==
=== Seeds ===
1. (India) Ashwini Ponnappa / N. Sikki Reddy (withdrew)
2. (Thailand) Benyapa Aimsaard / Nuntakarn Aimsaard (withdrew)
3. (India) K. Ashwini Bhat / Shikha Gautam (withdrew)
4. (Malaysia) Vivian Hoo / Lim Chiew Sien (withdrew)
5. (India) Gayatri Gopichand / Treesa Jolly (champions)
6. (Malaysia) Anna Cheong / Teoh Mei Xing (withdrew)
7. (India) Pranjal Prabhu Chimulkar / Akshaya Warang (withdrew)
8. (India) Sanyogita Ghorpade / Shruti Mishra (final)

=== Finals ===
Semi-finals
8	(India) Sanyogita Ghorpade (India) Shruti Mishra	10	21	21
(India) Srivedya Gurazada (United States) Ishika Jaiswal	21	18	17
5	(India) Gayatri Gopichand (India) Treesa Jolly	21	21
(India) Arul Bala Radhakrishnan (India) Nila Valluvan	9	6

Final
8	(India) Sanyogita Ghorpade (India) Shruti Mishra	12	10
5	(India) Gayatri Gopichand (India) Treesa Jolly	21	21

=== Top half ===
==== Section 1 ====
First round
PFQ	(India) M M Bora (India) L L Rachapalli	w	/	d
Q1
(Malaysia) Low Y Y (Malaysia) V Siow
PFQ	(India) A R Barman (India) S Shah	w	/	o
8	(India) S Ghorpade (India) S Mishra	21	21
(India) S S S Lakkamraju (India) S Panda	18	12
PFQ	(India) A Arumugam (India) P Neeluri
(India) M Riza (India) A S Sunil	w	/	o

Second round
PFQ	(India) A R Barman (India) S Shah	w	/	o
8	(India) S Ghorpade (India) S Mishra	17	21	21
(India) M Riza (India) A S Sunil	21	18	17

Quarter-finals
PFQ	(India) A R Barman (India) S Shah	5	7
8	(India) S Ghorpade (India) S Mishra	21	21

==== Section 2 ====
First round
4	(Malaysia) V Hoo (Malaysia) Lim C S
(India) H M Harinarayanan (India) A Roy	w	/	o
(India) S Gurazada (United States) I Jaiswal	w	/	o
PFQ	(India) T Nahar (India) A Yadav
PFQ	(India) P Arora (India) U Hooda	w	/	o
Q2
(India) T Crasto (India) R Panda
PFQ	(India) Nikki Rapria (India) Nishu Rapria	w	/	o

Second round
(India) H M Harinarayanan (India) A Roy	21	16
(India) S Gurazada (United States) I Jaiswal	23	21
PFQ	(India) P Arora (India) U Hooda	21	21
PFQ	(India) Nikki Rapria (India) Nishu Rapria	12	8

Quarter-finals
(India) S Gurazada (United States) I Jaiswal	21	16	21
PFQ	(India) P Arora (India) U Hooda	8	21	14

=== Bottom half ===
==== Section 3 ====
First round
(India) R Sharma (India) R K Toor	w	/	d
PFQ	(India) D Jagadish G (India) S P Krishnapriya	w	/	d
PFQ	(India) M Dey (India) U Palit	3	6
5	(India) G Gopichand (India) T Jolly	21	21
PFQ	(India) V Khadkekar (India) E Koner	21	19	21
(India) D Choudhary (India) Y Jakhar	18	21	15
(India) A Kandula (India) A A Pai	w	/	d
3	(India) K A Bhat (India) S Gautam	w	/	d

Second round
5	(India) G Gopichand (India) T Jolly	w	/	o
PFQ	(India) V Khadkekar (India) E Koner	w	/	o

Quarter-finals
5	(India) G Gopichand (India) T Jolly	21	21
PFQ	(India) V Khadkekar (India) E Koner	7	3

==== Section 4 ====
First round
Q3
Q4
(India) R Jaiswal (India) J A Kowsar	w	/	o
6	(Malaysia) A Cheong (Malaysia) Teoh M X
(India) J Ananthakumar (India) D R.Balasubramanian
(India) A B Radhakrishnan (India) N Valluvan	w	/	o
(India) P Singh (India) A Wase	w	/	o
PFQ	(India) S Mansoori (India) K Saraswat

Second round
(India) R Jaiswal (India) J A Kowsar	w	/	o
(India) A B Radhakrishnan (India) N Valluvan	21	21
(India) P Singh (India) A Wase	5	7

Quarter-finals
(India) R Jaiswal (India) J A Kowsar	11	3
(India) A B Radhakrishnan (India) N Valluvan	21	21

== Mixed doubles ==
=== Seeds ===
1. (England) Callum Hemming / Jessica Pugh (withdrew)
2. (India) Venkat Gaurav Prasad / Juhi Dewangan (withdrew)
3. (India) Dhruv Kapila / N. Sikki Reddy (withdrew)
4. (India) Ishaan Bhatnagar / Tanisha Crasto (withdrew)
5. (India) Tarun Kona / Rutaparna Panda (withdrew)
6. (India) Raju Mohamed Rehan / Jamaludeen Anees Kowsar (second round)
7. (India) Saurabh Sharma / Prajakta Sawant (withdrew)
8. (Singapore) Terry Hee / Tan Wei Han (withdrew)

=== Finals ===
Semi-finals
(India) Arjun M. R. (India) Treesa Jolly	21	21
(India) Balkeshari Yadav (India) Swetaparna Panda	9	9
(India) Mauryan Kathiravan (India) Kuhan Balashri	8	17
(Sri Lanka) Sachin Dias (Sri Lanka) Thilini Hendahewa	21	21

Final
(India) Arjun M. R. (India) Treesa Jolly	16	20
(Sri Lanka) Sachin Dias (Sri Lanka) Thilini Hendahewa	21	22

=== Top half ===
==== Section 1 ====
First round
(India) S Karunakaran (India) R V Chickmenhalli	w	/	d
(India) T H N Babu (India) S Gurazada	w	/	d
PFQ	(India) S Malik (India) N Rapria	13	16
PFQ	(India) N K A Bakkar (India) N Valluvan	21	21
6	(India) R M Rehan (India) J A Kowsar	w	/	o
(India) H. V. Nithin (India) K A Bhat
(India) Arjun M. R. (India) T Jolly	24	21
(India) D S Konthoujam (India) P Konjengbam	22	10

Second round
PFQ	(India) N K A Bakkar (India) N Valluvan	w	/	o
6	(India) R M Rehan (India) J A Kowsar	18	5
(India) Arjun M. R. (India) T Jolly	21	21

Quarter-finals
PFQ	(India) N K A Bakkar (India) N Valluvan	12	7
(India) Arjun M. R. (India) T Jolly	21	21

==== Section 2 ====
First round
4	(India) I Bhatnagar (India) T Crasto
(India) A Surya (India) P Prabhu Chimulkar	w	/	o
(India) B Yadav (India) S Panda	w	/	o
PFQ	(India) A Thakore (India) M Nayak
PFQ	(India) R Kumar Shah (India) R Jaiswal	w	/	o
Q3
(India) K Sharma (India) S Sharma	w	/	o
PFQ	(India) V R Pagilla (India) P Goudicherla

Second round
(India) A Surya (India) P P Chimulkar	21	13	19
(India) B Yadav (India) S Panda	12	21	21
PFQ	(India) R Kumar Shah (India) R Jaiswal	21	21
(India) K Sharma (India) S Sharma	11	15

Quarter-finals
(India) B Yadav (India) S Panda	21	21
PFQ	(India) R Kumar Shah (India) R Jaiswal	12	12

=== Bottom half ===
==== Section 3 ====
First round
(India) M Kathiravan (India) K Balashri	w	/	o
Q1
Q4
PFQ	(India) P Koka (India) M Khan	w	/	o
PFQ	(India) A Makhija (India) D Choudhary	w	/	o
Q2
(India) C Arora (India) N Rapria	w	/	o
3	(India) D Kapila (India) N. S Reddy

Second round
(India) M Kathiravan (India) K Balashri	23	21	21
PFQ	(India) P Koka (India) M Khan	25	15	11
PFQ	(India) A Makhija (India) D Choudhary	21	21
(India) C Arora (India) N Rapria	5	16

Quarter-finals
(India) M Kathiravan (India) K Balashri	w	/	o
PFQ	(India) A Makhija (India) D Choudhary

==== Section 4 ====
First round
(Sri Lanka) S Dias (Sri Lanka) T Hendahewa	w	/	o
PFR	(India) V Yadav (India) L Barreto
(India) D Rawat (India) S Gautam	21	21
PFQ	(India) S Ramagouni (India) A Kandula	10	18
(India) S. Sunjith Jr. (India) M Riza	21	21
PFQ	(India) G Sahni (India) S S S Lakkamraju	15	18
(India) S S Dhanraj (India) P Dandu	w	/	o
PFQ	(India) C Joshi (India) A A Pai

Second round
(Sri Lanka) S Dias (Sri Lanka) T Hendahewa	21	21
(India) D Rawat (India) S Gautam	11	14
(India) S. Sunjith Jr. (India) M Riza	15	21	21
(India) S S Dhanraj (India) P Dandu	21	9	17

Quarter-finals
(Sri Lanka) S Dias (Sri Lanka) T Hendahewa	21	22
(India) S. Sunjith Jr. (India) M Riza	11	20

Preceded by 2022 Syed Modi International	BWF World Tour; 2022 BWF season	Succeeded by 2022 German Open
