= 2022 India Open =

2022 badminton tournament in New Delhi

Tournament details
- Dates: 11–16 January
- Level: Super 500
- Total prize money: US$400,000
- Venue: K. D. Jadhav Indoor Hall
- Location: New Delhi, India

Champions
- Men's singles: (India) Lakshya Sen
- Women's singles: (Thailand) Busanan Ongbamrungphan
- Men's doubles: (India) Satwiksairaj Rankireddy (India) Chirag Shetty
- Women's doubles: (Thailand) Benyapa Aimsaard (Thailand) Nuntakarn Aimsaard
- Mixed doubles: (Singapore) Terry Hee (Singapore) Tan Wei Han

The 2022 India Open, officially known as the Yonex-Sunrise India Open 2022 for sponsorship reasons, was a badminton tournament that took place at the K. D. Jadhav Indoor Hall in New Delhi, India, from 11 to 16 January 2022. It had a total prize pool of US$400,000.

== Tournament ==
The 2022 India Open was the first tournament of the 2022 BWF World Tour and was part of the India Open championships, which had been held since 1973. The tournament was organized by the Badminton Association of India with sanction from the Badminton World Federation.

=== Venue ===
This international tournament was held at the K. D. Jadhav Indoor Hall in New Delhi, India.

=== Point distribution ===
Below is the point distribution table for each phase of the tournament based on the BWF points system for the BWF World Tour Super 500 event.

Winner	Runner-up	3/4	5/8	9/16	17/32
9,200	7,800	6,420	5,040	3,600	2,220

=== Prize money ===
The total prize money for this tournament was US$400,000. The distribution of the prize money was in accordance by BWF regulations.

Event	Winner	Finalist	Semi-finals	Quarter-finals	Last 16
Singles	$30,000	$15,200	$5,800	$2,400	$1,400
Doubles	$31,600	$15,200	$5,600	$2,900	$1,500

== Impact of COVID-19 ==
Due to COVID-19, the tournament was held behind closed doors at K. D. Jadhav Indoor Hall with the participating players tested for COVID-19 daily.

However, there were many shuttlers withdrawing from the tournament before and during the tournament. On 7 January 2022, the entire England contingent withdrew before the competition started after Sean Vendy and Nathan Robertson was tested positive with COVID-19. On 12 January 2022, seven Indian shuttlers, including Srikanth Kidambi was withdrawn for the same reason. Rodion Alimov and Alina Davletova had to withdraw as well after Alimov was tested positive, giving Terry Hee and Tan Wei Han a walkover on their mixed doubles semi-finals.

== Men's singles ==
=== Seeds ===
1. (India) Srikanth Kidambi (second round)
2. (India) B. Sai Praneeth (withdrew)
3. (India) Lakshya Sen (champion)
4. (Thailand) Kantaphon Wangcharoen (withdrew)
5. (Singapore) Loh Kean Yew (final)
6. (India) Sameer Verma (second round)
7. (Indonesia) Tommy Sugiarto (first round)
8. (India) Prannoy Kumar (quarter-finals)

=== Finals ===
Semi-finals
(Canada) Brian Yang
5	(Singapore) Loh Kean Yew	w	/	o
3	(India) Lakshya Sen	19	21	21
(Malaysia) Ng Tze Yong	21	16	12

Final
5	(Singapore) Loh Kean Yew	22	17
3	(India) Lakshya Sen	24	21

=== Top half ===
==== Section 1 ====
First round
1	(India) S Kidambi	21	21
(India) Si Verma	17	10
(India) S Dey	19	21	14
(Denmark) K Bruun	21	18	21
6	(India) Sa Verma	21	21
(India) So Verma	7	7
(India) K George	20	15
(Canada) B Yang	22	21

Second round
1	(India) S Kidambi
(Denmark) K Bruun	w	/	o
6	(India) Sa Verma	2^{r}
(Canada) B Yang	4

Quarter-finals
(Denmark) K Bruun	19	18
(Canada) B Yang	21	21

==== Section 2 ====
First round
PFR	(India) K G Kumar	11	15
(Finland) K Koljonen	21	21
(Malaysia) Cheam J W	20	18
(Russia) S Sirant	22	21
5	(Singapore) Loh K Y	16	21	21
(Canada) XD Sheng	21	4	13
(Malaysia) Soong J V	21	21
(India) C Sen	8	7

Second round
(Finland) K Koljonen	18	15
(Russia) S Sirant	21	21
5	(Singapore) Loh K Y	21	21
(Malaysia) Soong J V	12	12

Quarter-finals
(Russia) S Sirant	16	13
5	(Singapore) Loh K Y	21	21

=== Bottom half ===
==== Section 3 ====
First round
(India) M Manjunath	21	15	21
(France) A Merklé	16	21	10
(Spain) P Abián	14	7
8	(India) Prannoy K	21	21
(Canada) B. R. Sankeerth
(Sweden) F Burestedt	w	/	o
(Egypt) A H Elgamal	15	7
3	(India) L Sen	21	21

Second round
(India) M Manjunath
8	(India) Prannoy K	w	/	o
(Sweden) F Burestedt	12	15
3	(India) L Sen	21	21

Quarter-finals
8	(India) Prannoy K	21	9	14
3	(India) L Sen	14	21	21

==== Section 4 ====
First round
PFR	(India) P Rajawat	21	17	14
(France) L Claerbout	15	21	21
(Malaysia) Ng T Y	21	14	21
7	(Indonesia) T Sugiarto	16	21	5
(Republic of Ireland) N Nguyen	19	21	21
(India) A Jayaram	21	7	14
(Spain) L E Peñalver
PFR	(India) R Y Chittaboina	w	/	o

Second round
(France) L Claerbout	22	15	18
(Malaysia) Ng T Y	20	21	21
(Republic of Ireland) N Nguyen	21	21
PFR	(India) R Y Chittaboina	17	13

Quarter-finals
(Malaysia) Ng T Y	9	21	21
(Republic of Ireland) N Nguyen	21	8	16

== Women's singles ==
=== Seeds ===
1. (India) P. V. Sindhu (semi-finals)
2. (Thailand) Busanan Ongbamrungphan (champion)
3. (Singapore) Yeo Jia Min (quarter-finals)
4. (India) Saina Nehwal (second round)
5. (Russia) Evgeniya Kosetskaya (first round)
6. (Thailand) Supanida Katethong (final)
7. (United States) Iris Wang (withdrew)
8. (Indonesia) Fitriani (withdrew)

=== Finals ===
Semi-finals
1	(India) P. V. Sindhu	14	21	10
6	(Thailand) Supanida Katethong	21	13	21
(India) Aakarshi Kashyap	24	9
2	(Thailand) Busanan Ongbamrungphan	26	21

Final
6	(Thailand) Supanida Katethong	20	21	13
2	(Thailand) Busanan Ongbamrungphan	22	19	21

=== Top half ===
==== Section 1 ====
First round
1	(India) P. V. Sindhu	21	21
(India) S K P Kudaravalli	5	16
(India) I Sharma	21	21
(Egypt) D Hany	10	11
5	(Russia) E Kosetskaya	22	16
(India) A Chaliha	24	21
(India) R Mookerjee	14	13
(France) Y Hoyaux	21	21

Second round
1	(India) P. V. Sindhu	21	21
(India) I Sharma	10	10
(India) A Chaliha	21	21
(France) Y Hoyaux	17	14

Quarter-finals
1	(India) P. V. Sindhu	21	21
(India) A Chaliha	7	18

==== Section 2 ====
First round
3	(Singapore) Yeo J M	21	21
(United States) D Gupta	7	10
(India) A Upadhyaya	21	21
(India) M Agrey	11	15
6	(Thailand) S Katethong	21	21
(India) R Das	12	7
(India) S Mundada	20	15
PFR	(Ukraine) P Buhrova	22	21

Second round
3	(Singapore) Yeo J M	13	21	21
(India) A Upadhyaya	21	7	12
6	(Thailand) S Katethong	21	21
PFR	(Ukraine) P Buhrova	7	10

Quarter-finals
3	(Singapore) Yeo J M
6	(Thailand) S Katethong	w	/	o

=== Bottom half ===
==== Section 3 ====
First round
(India) A Prabhudesai	14	14
(India) A Kashyap	21	21
PFR	(India) K Mopati	15	21	21
PFR	(India) S Toshniwal	21	19	8
(India) M Bansod	21	21
(India) S I Farooqui	18	9
(Czech Republic) T Švábíková	20	0^{r}
4	(India) S Nehwal	22	1

Second round
(India) A Kashyap	21	21
PFR	(India) K Mopati	10	10
(India) M Bansod	21	21
4	(India) S Nehwal	17	9

Quarter-finals
(India) A Kashyap	21	21
(India) M Bansod	12	15

==== Section 4 ====
First round
(India) T Hemanth	9	21	21
(India) S U R Chukka	21	12	19
(United States) L Lam	21	21
PFR	(Ukraine) M Stoliarenko	14	10
(Poland) J Hart	9	13
(Ukraine) M Ulitina	21	21
(Canada) W Y Zhang
2	(Thailand) B Ongbamrungphan	w	/	o

Second round
(India) T Hemanth	18	11
(United States) L Lam	21	21
(Ukraine) M Ulitina	9	13
2	(Thailand) B Ongbamrungphan	21	21

Quarter-finals
(United States) L Lam	12	8
2	(Thailand) B Ongbamrungphan	21	21

== Men's doubles ==
=== Seeds ===
1. (Indonesia) Mohammad Ahsan / Hendra Setiawan (final)
2. (India) Satwiksairaj Rankireddy / Chirag Shetty (champions)
3. (Malaysia) Ong Yew Sin / Teo Ee Yi (semi-finals)
4. (England) Ben Lane / Sean Vendy (withdrew)
5. (India) B. Sumeeth Reddy / Manu Attri (withdrew)
6. (India) Arjun MR / Dhruv Kapila (second round)
7. (India) Krishna Prasad Garaga / Vishnuvardhan Goud Panjala (first round)
8. (France) Fabien Delrue / William Villeger (semi-finals)

=== Finals ===
Semi-finals
1	(Indonesia) Mohammad Ahsan (Indonesia) Hendra Setiawan	21	21
3	(Malaysia) Ong Yew Sin (Malaysia) Teo Ee Yi	15	18
8	(France) Fabien Delrue (France) William Villeger	10	18
2	(India) Satwiksairaj Rankireddy (India) Chirag Shetty	21	21

Final
1	(Indonesia) Mohammad Ahsan (Indonesia) Hendra Setiawan	16	24
2	(India) Satwiksairaj Rankireddy (India) Chirag Shetty	21	26

=== Top half ===
==== Section 1 ====
First round
1	(Indonesia) M Ahsan (Indonesia) H Setiawan	21	21
(India) P S Chouhan (India) R Verma	18	10
(India) B Chakraborty (India) K Chaudhary	21	21
(India) S Dalal (India) S Malik	17	18
5	(India) M Attri (India) B. S Reddy
(Norway) T Flåtten (Norway) V Rikheim	w	/	o
(India) V K H Ranganatha (India) A Surya	21	21
(India) H Mittal (India) S Sharma	13	16

Second round
1	(Indonesia) M Ahsan (Indonesia) H Setiawan	21	21
(India) B Chakraborty (India) K Chaudhary	17	9
(Norway) T Flåtten (Norway) V Rikheim	21	6	21
(India) V K H Ranganatha (India) A Surya	17	21	18

Quarter-finals
1	(Indonesia) M Ahsan (Indonesia) H Setiawan	21	21
(Norway) T Flåtten (Norway) V Rikheim	12	14

==== Section 2 ====
First round
3	(Malaysia) Ong Y S (Malaysia) Teo E Y	21	21
(India) P. S. Ravikrishna (India) S P Udayakumar	19	14
(India) S Jakhar (India) L Saroha	13	12
(India) U Arora (India) A Shetty	21	21
6	(India) Arjun M.R. (India) D Kapila	18	21	21
(Malaysia) N M Azriyn A (Malaysia) Lim K W	21	17	15
(Russia) K Abramov (Russia) R Alimov	19	19
(India) I Bhatnagar (India) K. Sai Pratheek	21	21

Second round
3	(Malaysia) Ong Y S (Malaysia) Teo E Y	w	/	o
(India) U Arora (India) A Shetty
6	(India) Arjun M.R. (India) D Kapila
(India) I Bhatnagar (India) K. Sai Pratheek	w	/	o

Quarter-finals
3	(Malaysia) Ong Y S (Malaysia) Teo E Y	21	21
(India) I Bhatnagar (India) K. Sai Pratheek	7	7

=== Bottom half ===
==== Section 3 ====
First round
(India) S S Dhanraj (India) S Elango	21	21
(India) V Chawat (India) P Naithani	11	15
PFR	(India) A Kongara (India) V Prasad	7	7
8	(France) F Delrue (France) W Villeger	21	21
(Republic of Ireland) J Magee (Republic of Ireland) P Reynolds	21	21
PFR	(India) H Ambekar (India) A Javadekar	6	10
(India) M Elumalai (India) V Vasudevan	14	17
PFR	(India) Vaibhaav (India) H. V. Nithin	21	21

Second round
(India) S S Dhanraj (India) S Elango	18	15
8	(France) F Delrue (France) W Villeger	21	21
(Republic of Ireland) J Magee (Republic of Ireland) P Reynolds	21	21
PFR	(India) Vaibhaav (India) H. V. Nithin	14	13

Quarter-finals
8	(France) F Delrue (France) W Villeger	21	23
(Republic of Ireland) J Magee (Republic of Ireland) P Reynolds	9	21

==== Section 4 ====
First round
(India) G Deswal (India) S Yadav	17	21	21
PFR	(India) A Makhija (India) V G Prasad	21	19	18
(Singapore) T Hee (Singapore) Loh K H	21	21
7	(India) K P Garaga (India) V G Panjala	16	16
(India) A Kadam (India) R M Rehan	8	17
PFR	(India) S Prasad (India) S. Sunjith Jr.	21	21
(India) Ravi (India) C Arora	14	10
2	(India) S Rankireddy (India) C Shetty	21	21

Second round
(India) G Deswal (India) S Yadav	12	11
(Singapore) T Hee (Singapore) Loh K H	21	21
PFR	(India) S Prasad (India) S. Sunjith Jr.	9	18
2	(India) S Rankireddy (India) C Shetty	21	21

Quarter-finals
(Singapore) T Hee (Singapore) Loh K H	18	18
2	(India) S Rankireddy (India) C Shetty	21	21

== Women's doubles ==
=== Seeds ===
1. (Thailand) Jongkolphan Kititharakul / Rawinda Prajongjai (withdrew)
2. (India) Ashwini Ponnappa / N. Sikki Reddy (second round)
3. (Russia) Anastasiia Akchurina / Olga Morozova (final)
4. (Thailand) Benyapa Aimsaard / Nuntakarn Aimsaard (champions)
5. (Malaysia) Vivian Hoo / Lim Chiew Sien (quarter-finals)
6. (France) Margot Lambert / Anne Tran (withdrew)
7. (India) Gayatri Gopichand / Treesa Jolly (second round)
8. (India) Shikha Gautam / K. Ashwini Bhat (quarter-finals)

=== Finals ===
Semi-finals
(India) Haritha Manazhiyil Harinarayanan (India) Ashna Roy	12	9
4	(Thailand) Benyapa Aimsaard (Thailand) Nuntakarn Aimsaard	21	21
3	(Russia) Anastasiia Akchurina (Russia) Olga Morozova	w	/	o
(Russia) Ekaterina Malkova (Russia) Anastasiia Shapovalova

Final
4	(Thailand) Benyapa Aimsaard (Thailand) Nuntakarn Aimsaard	21	21
3	(Russia) Anastasiia Akchurina (Russia) Olga Morozova	13	5

=== Top half ===
==== Section 1 ====
First round
PFR	(India) N Manglam (India) L Srivastava	13	15
(India) Ka Gupta (India) Kh Gupta	21	21
(India) R Jaiswal (India) J A Kowsar	18	21	21
(India) Nikki Rapria (India) Nishu Rapria	21	16	15
7	(India) G Gopichand (India) T Jolly	21	21
(Ukraine) A Prozorova (Ukraine) V Rudakova	12	10
(India) J Dewangan (India) D Gupta	16	14
(India) H M Harinarayanan (India) A Roy	21	21

Second round
(India) Ka Gupta (India) Kh Gupta
(India) R Jaiswal (India) J A Kowsar	w	/	o
7	(India) G Gopichand (India) T Jolly
(India) H M Harinarayanan (India) A Roy	w	/	o

Quarter-finals
(India) R Jaiswal (India) J A Kowsar	16	16
(India) H M Harinarayanan (India) A Roy	21	21

==== Section 2 ====
First round
4	(Thailand) B Aimsaard (Thailand) N Aimsaard	21	21
(India) T Crasto (India) R Panda	19	18
(India) T Deshpande (India) S Mundada	17	21	21
PFR	(India) P Arora (India) U Hooda	21	6	19
PFR	(India) Deethya Jagadish G (India) S P Krishnapriya	19	20
(India) D Choudhary (India) Y Jakhar	21	22
(Ukraine) M Stoliarenko (Ukraine) Y Zharka	21	20	19
(India) S Singhi (India) R Thaker	14	22	21

Second round
4	(Thailand) B Aimsaard (Thailand) N Aimsaard	21	21
(India) T Deshpande (India) S Mundada	7	9
(India) D Choudhary (India) Y Jakhar	w	/	o
(India) S Singhi (India) R Thaker

Quarter-finals
4	(Thailand) B Aimsaard (Thailand) N Aimsaard	21	21
(India) D Choudhary (India) Y Jakhar	8	3

=== Bottom half ===
==== Section 3 ====
First round
(India) S Gurazada (United States) I Jaiswal	21	21
(India) M M Bora (India) L L Rachapalli	9	7
(Indonesia) Fitriani (Indonesia) Y Y Susanto
5	(Malaysia) V Hoo (Malaysia) Lim C S	w	/	o
(India) A Das (India) S Saikia	w	/	o
(India) S Ghorpade (India) P Sawant
PFR	(India) Lovely (India) K Saraswat	2	1
3	(Russia) A Akchurina (Russia) O Morozova	21	21

Second round
(India) S Gurazada (United States) I Jaiswal	15	15
5	(Malaysia) V Hoo (Malaysia) Lim C S	21	21
(India) A Das (India) S Saikia	2	12
3	(Russia) A Akchurina (Russia) O Morozova	21	21

Quarter-finals
5	(Malaysia) V Hoo (Malaysia) Lim C S	19	21	16
3	(Russia) A Akchurina (Russia) O Morozova	21	11	21

==== Section 4 ====
First round
(India) R V Chickmenhalli (India) A Nayak	21	21
(India) C H Poornima (India) V Kapila	11	10
(India) D Gautam (India) A Kaushik	4	4
8	(India) K A Bhat (India) S Gautam	21	21
(Russia) E Malkova (Russia) A Shapovalova	21	21
(India) S Christian (India) L Sharma	7	8
(India) J Ananthakumar (India) D R Balasbramanian	7	21	13
2	(India) A Ponnappa (India) N. S Reddy	21	19	21

Second round
(India) R V Chickmenhalli (India) A Nayak	10	13
8	(India) K A Bhat (India) S Gautam	21	21
(Russia) E Malkova (Russia) A Shapovalova	w	/	o
2	(India) A Ponnappa (India) N. S Reddy

Quarter-finals
8	(India) K A Bhat (India) S Gautam	18	14
(Russia) E Malkova (Russia) A Shapovalova	21	21

== Mixed doubles ==
=== Seeds ===
1. (Malaysia) Tan Kian Meng / Lai Pei Jing (semi-finals)
2. (Russia) Rodion Alimov / Alina Davletova (semi-finals)
3. (Malaysia) Chen Tang Jie / Peck Yen Wei (final)
4. (England) Callum Hemming / Jessica Pugh (withdrew)
5. (Malaysia) Chan Peng Soon / Valeree Siow (quarter-finals)
6. (Egypt) Adham Hatem Elgamal / Doha Hany (second round)
7. (India) Dhruv Kapila / Nelakurihi Sikki Reddy (second round)
8. (India) Venkat Gaurav Prasad / Juhi Dewangan (quarter-finals)

=== Finals ===
Semi-finals
1	(Malaysia) Tan Kian Meng (Malaysia) Lai Pei Jing	19	23	14
3	(Malaysia) Chen Tang Jie (Malaysia) Peck Yen Wei	21	21	21
(Singapore) Terry Hee (Singapore) Tan Wei Han	w	/	o
2	(Russia) Rodion Alimov (Russia) Alina Davletova

Final
3	(Malaysia) Chen Tang Jie (Malaysia) Peck Yen Wei	15	18
(Singapore) Terry Hee (Singapore) Tan Wei Han	21	21

=== Top half ===
==== Section 1 ====
First round
1	(Malaysia) Tan K M (Malaysia) Lai P J	21	21
(India) P Ranade (India) K Kanwal	10	11
(India) S Jakhar (India) M M Bora	w	/	o
PFR	(India) M S Khwairakpam (India) N Manglam
7	(India) D Kapila (India) N. S Reddy	21	21
(India) C Arora (India) N Rapria	11	11
(India) S Sarma (India) P Sawant
PFR	(Russia) K Abramov (Russia) A Akchurina	w	/	o

Second round
1	(Malaysia) Tan K M (Malaysia) Lai P J	21	21
(India) S Jakhar (India) M M Bora	6	11
7	(India) D Kapila (India) N. S Reddy
(Russia) K Abramov (Russia) A Akchurina	w	/	o

Quarter-finals
1	(Malaysia) Tan K M (Malaysia) Lai P J	21	21
(Russia) K Abramov (Russia) A Akchurina	10	14

==== Section 2 ====
First round
3	(Malaysia) Chen T J (Malaysia) Peck Y W	21	21
(India) Arjun M.R. (India) T Jolly	11	6
(India) K. Sai Pratheek (India) G Gopichand	21	16	21
(India) I Bhatnagar (India) T Crasto	16	21	17
8	(India) V G Prasad (India) J Dewangan	21	21
PFR	(India) A Arora (India) R Garg	9	8
PFR	(India) A Agarwal (India) S Shukla	17	21	16
(India) S S Dhanraj (India) P Dandu	21	17	21

Second round
3	(Malaysia) Chen T J (Malaysia) Peck Y W	w	/	o
(India) K.Sai Pratheek (India) G Gopichand
8	(India) V G Prasad (India) J Dewangan	21	21	21
(India) S S Dhanraj (India) P Dandu	16	23	19

Quarter-finals
3	(Malaysia) Chen T J (Malaysia) Peck Y W	21	21
8	(India) V G Prasad (India) J Dewangan	10	13

=== Bottom half ===
==== Section 3 ====
First round
(India) H. V. Nithin (India) K A Bhat	21	15	21
(India) S P Udayakumar (India) K Gupta	17	21	12
PFR	(India) V Thakran (India) H Sehrawat	6	14
6	(Egypt) A H Elgamal (Egypt) D Hany	21	21
(India) A Saxena (India) S Saikia	11	12
PFR	(India) A Shetty (India) S Singhi	21	21
(Singapore) T Hee (Singapore) Tan W H	21	21
PFR	(India) T H N Babu (India) S Gurazada	12	17

Second round
(India) H. V. Nithin (India) K A Bhat	23	21
6	(Egypt) A H Elgamal (Egypt) D Hany	21	7
PFR	(India) A Shetty (India) S Singhi
(Singapore) T Hee (Singapore) Tan W H	w	/	o

Quarter-finals
(India) H. V. Nithin (India) K A Bhat	15	19
(Singapore) T Hee (Singapore) Tan W H	21	21

==== Section 4 ====
First round
(India) K Sharma (India) S Sharma	21	21
(India) K Dhindhwal (India) D Gautam	17	14
(India) R M Rehan (India) J A Kowsar	4	9
5	(Malaysia) Chan P S (Malaysia) V Siow	21	21
(India) G Deswal (India) A Kaushik	12	17
PFR	(India) A Makhija (India) D Choudhary	21	21
(India) B S Reddy (India) A Ponnappa
2	(Russia) R Alimov (Russia) A Davletova	w	/	o

Second round
(India) K Sharma (India) S Sharma	6	8
5	(Malaysia) Chan P S (Malaysia) V Siow	21	21
PFR	(India) A Makhija (India) D Choudhary	6	7
2	(Russia) R Alimov (Russia) A Davletova	21	21

Quarter-finals
5	(Malaysia) Chan P S (Malaysia) V Siow	14	13
2	(Russia) R Alimov (Russia) A Davletova	21	21

Preceded by 2021 BWF World Tour Finals	BWF World Tour; 2022 BWF season	Succeeded by 2022 Syed Modi International
