= 2022 Syed Modi International =

2022 badminton tournament in Lucknow

Tournament details
- Dates: 18–23 January
- Level: Super 300
- Total prize money: US$150,000
- Venue: Babu Banarasi Das Indoor Stadium
- Location: Lucknow, Uttar Pradesh, India

Champions
- Men's singles: Not awarded
- Women's singles: (India) P. V. Sindhu
- Men's doubles: (Malaysia) Man Wei Chong (Malaysia) Tee Kai Wun
- Women's doubles: (Malaysia) Anna Cheong (Malaysia) Teoh Mei Xing
- Mixed doubles: (India) Ishaan Bhatnagar (India) Tanisha Crasto

The 2022 Syed Modi International (officially known as the Syed Modi India International) was a badminton tournament that took place at the Babu Banarasi Das Indoor Stadium in Lucknow, Uttar Pradesh, India, from 18 to 23 January 2022. It had a total prize pool of US$150,000.

The men's singles title was not awarded, a first in the tournament's and the sport's history, due to both finalists – both French – contracted with COVID-19.

== Tournament ==
The 2022 Syed Modi International was the second tournament of the 2022 BWF World Tour and was part of the Syed Modi International Badminton Championships, which had been held since 1991. The tournament was organized by the Badminton Association of India with sanction from the Badminton World Federation.

=== Venue ===
This international tournament was held at the Babu Banarasi Das Indoor Stadium at Gomti Nagar, Lucknow, Uttar Pradesh, India.

=== Point distribution ===
Below is the point distribution table for each phase of the tournament based on the BWF points system for the BWF World Tour Super 300 event.

Winner	Runner-up	3/4	5/8	9/16	17/32
7,000	5,950	4,900	3,850	2,750	1,670

=== Prize money ===
The total prize money for this tournament was US$150,000. The distribution of the prize money was in accordance with BWF regulations.

Event	Winner	Finalist	Semi-finals	Quarter-finals	Last 16
Singles	$11,250	$5,700	$2,175	$900	$525
Doubles	$11,850	$5,700	$2,100	$1,087.50	$562.50

== Men's singles ==
=== Seeds ===
1. (India) Srikanth Kidambi (withdrew)
2. (India) Lakshya Sen (withdrew)
3. (India) B. Sai Praneeth (withdrew)
4. (India) Sameer Verma (first round)
5. (India) Prannoy Kumar (quarter-finals)
6. (India) Parupalli Kashyap (withdrew)
7. (India) Sourabh Verma (first round)
8. (Canada) Brian Yang (withdrew)

=== Finals ===
Semi-finals
(France) Arnaud Merklé	21	17	21
(India) Mithun Manjunath	19	21	9
(Republic of Ireland) Nhat Nguyen	21	18	15
(France) Lucas Claerbout	15	21	21

Final
(France) Arnaud Merklé	w	/	d
(France) Lucas Claerbout	w	/	d

=== Top half ===
==== Section 1 ====
First round
PFR	(Sri Lanka) B Goonethilleka	10	6
(France) A Merklé	21	21
(India) K G Kumar	9
(India) S Dey	2^{r}
5	(India) Prannoy K	21	21
(Ukraine) D Bosniuk	14	18
(India) P Rajawat	w	/	o
(India) R Y Chittaboina

Second round
(France) A Merklé	21	21
(India) K G Kumar	8	12
5	(India) Prannoy K	21	16	21
(India) P Rajawat	11	21	18

Quarter-finals
(France) A Merklé	21	21
5	(India) Prannoy K	19	16

==== Section 2 ====
First round
PFR	(India) A Yadav	9	6
(India) C Sen	21	21
(India) K George	16	18
(Russia) S Sirant	21	21
PFR	(India) S Subramanian	18	15
(Malaysia) Soong J V	21	21
(India) A Mishra	15	8
(India) M Manjunath	21	21

Second round
(India) C Sen	21	20	12
(Russia) S Sirant	18	22	21
(Malaysia) Soong J V	21	16	21
(India) M Manjunath	16	21	23

Quarter-finals
(Russia) S Sirant	21	12	18
(India) M Manjunath	11	21	21

=== Bottom half ===
==== Section 3 ====
First round
PFR	(Belgium) J Carraggi	21	23
(Denmark) K Bruun	12	21
(Azerbaijan) A R Dwicahyo	15	21	21
7	(India) So Verma	21	19	18
PFR	(Thailand) A Namkul	w	/	o
(Malaysia) Ng T Y
(Republic of Ireland) N Nguyen	7
4	(India) Sa Verma	2^{r}

Second round
PFR	(Belgium) J Carraggi	21	21
(Azerbaijan) A R Dwicahyo	15	16
PFR	(Thailand) A Namkul	17	12
(Republic of Ireland) N Nguyen	21	21

Quarter-finals
PFR	(Belgium) J Carraggi	14	15
(Republic of Ireland) N Nguyen	21	21

==== Section 4 ====
First round
(France) L Claerbout	21	21
(India) S P Singh	15	8
(India) Si Verma	19	21	18
PFR	(India) R Mariswamy	21	13	21
(Malaysia) Cheam J W	19	22	21
(Canada) XD Sheng	21	20	17
(Singapore) J Teh	21	11	16
PFR	(India) K Dharmamer	14	21	21

Second round
(France) L Claerbout	21	21
PFR	(India) R Mariswamy	9	9
(Malaysia) Cheam J W	21	21
PFR	(India) K Dharmamer	16	13

Quarter-finals
(France) L Claerbout	21	21
(Malaysia) Cheam J W	11	19

== Women's singles ==
=== Seeds ===
1. (India) P. V. Sindhu (champion)
2. (Canada) Michelle Li (withdrew)
3. (Singapore) Yeo Jia Min (withdrew)
4. (India) Saina Nehwal (withdrew)
5. (Russia) Evgeniya Kosetskaya (semi-finals)
6. (Thailand) Supanida Katethong (quarter-finals)
7. (United States) Iris Wang (withdrew)
8. (Poland) Jordan Hart (withdrew)

=== Finals ===
Semi-finals
1	(India) P. V. Sindhu	21
5	(Russia) Evgeniya Kosetskaya	11^{r}
(India) Anupama Upadhyaya	21	19	7
(India) Malvika Bansod	19	21	21

Final
1	(India) P. V. Sindhu	21	21
(India) Malvika Bansod	13	16

=== Top half ===
==== Section 1 ====
First round
1	(India) P. V. Sindhu	21	21
(India) T Hemanth	9	9
(United States) L Lam	15	21	21
(India) I Sharma	21	16	16
6	(Thailand) S Katethong	21	21
(India) S K P Kudaravalli	13	13
PFR	(India) K Bharadwaj	21	21
PFR	(India) T M Palli	6	4

Second round
1	(India) P. V. Sindhu	21	21
(United States) L Lam	16	13
6	(Thailand) S Katethong	21	21
PFR	(India) K Bharadwaj	11	7

Quarter-finals
1	(India) P. V. Sindhu	11	21	21
6	(Thailand) S Katethong	21	12	17

==== Section 2 ====
First round
PFR	(India) I Baruah	15	21	18
(Czech Republic) T Švábíková	21	13	21
PFR	(United States) I Jaiswal	21	21
(India) R Mookerjee	8	15
5	(Russia) E Kosetskaya	21	21
PFR	(India) V Choudhari	16	10
(India) A Prabhudesai	17	8
(France) Y Hoyaux	21	21

Second round
(Czech Republic) T Švábíková	21	21
(United States) I Jaiswal	16	13
5	(Russia) E Kosetskaya	21	21
(France) Y Hoyaux	18	14

Quarter-finals
(Czech Republic) T Švábíková	8	14
5	(Russia) E Kosetskaya	21	21

=== Bottom half ===
==== Section 3 ====
First round
(India) R Das	7	10
(India) A Upadhyaya	21	21
PFR	(India) P Barve	13	10
PFR	(India) S Toshniwal	21	21
(India) S I Farooqui	17	21	21
(India) S Mundada	21	11	10
(United States) D Gupta	15	21	6
PFR	(India) K Kanwal	21	16	21

Second round
(India) A Upadhyaya	21	21
PFR	(India) S Toshniwal	12	19
(India) S I Farooqui	21	21
PFR	(India) K Kanwal	6	15

Quarter-finals
(India) A Upadhyaya	24	23
(India) S I Farooqui	22	21

==== Section 4 ====
First round
(India) M Agrey	13	14
(India) A Kashyap	21	21
(India) S U R Chukka	21	21
PFR	(India) A Kumari	9	12
(India) A Chaliha
(India) M Bansod	w	/	o
PFR	(India) P Neeluri	21	21
PFR	(India) Gadde R S	3	4

Second round
(India) A Kashyap	21	21
(India) S U R Chukka	9	6
(India) M Bansod	21	21
PFR	(India) P Neeluri	10	8

Quarter-finals
(India) A Kashyap	11	11
(India) M Bansod	21	21

== Men's doubles ==
=== Seeds ===
1. (India) Satwiksairaj Rankireddy / Chirag Shetty (withdrew)
2. (Russia) Vladimir Ivanov / Ivan Sozonov (quarter-finals)
3. (India) B. Sumeeth Reddy / Manu Attri (withdrew)
4. (India) Arjun M.R. / Dhruv Kapila (semi-finals)
5. (Malaysia) Tan Kian Meng / Tan Wee Kiong (withdrew)
6. (India) Vishnu Vardhan Goud Panjala / Krishna Prasad Garaga (final)
7. (France) Fabien Delrue / William Villeger (quarter-finals)
8. (Malaysia) Man Wei Chong / Tee Kai Wun (champions)

=== Finals ===
Semi-finals
(India) Prem Singh Chouhan (India) Rajesh Verma	10	9
6	(India) Krishna Prasad Garaga (India) Vishnuvardhan Goud Panjala	21	21
4	(India) Arjun M.R. (India) Dhruv Kapila	16	12
8	(Malaysia) Man Wei Chong (Malaysia) Tee Kai Wun	21	21

Final
6	(India) Krishna Prasad Garaga (India) Vishnuvardhan Goud Panjala	18	15
8	(Malaysia) Man Wei Chong (Malaysia) Tee Kai Wun	21	21

=== Top half ===
==== Section 1 ====
First round
PFR	(India) P S Chouhan (India) R Verma	21	21
(India) Gagan (India) S Hooda	18	19
PFR	(India) B Chhabra (India) G Sahni
(India) V Devlekar (India) D Rambiya	w	/	o
PFR	(India) H Ambekar (India) A Javadekar	w	/	d
(India) K Chahal (India) D Khatri	w	/	d
PFR	(India) K Raj (India) P Raj
(India) A Kale (India) A Mayekar	w	/	o

Second round
PFR	(India) P S Chouhan (India) R Verma	w	/	o
(India) V Devlekar (India) D Rambiya
(India) A Kale (India) A Mayekar	w	/	o

Quarter-finals
PFR	(India) P S Chouhan (India) R Verma	21	21
(India) A Kale (India) A Mayekar	17	13

==== Section 2 ====
First round
PFR	(India) S Prasad (India) S. Sunjith Jr.	w	/	o
PFR	(India) B Navaneeth (India) S S K Podile
(India) I Bhatnagar (India) K. Sai Pratheek	21	19	21
(Malaysia) A Junaidi (Malaysia) M Haikal	18	21	17
6	(India) K P Garaga (India) V G Panjala	21	21
(India) V K Hanumaiah Ranganatha (India) A Surya	15	14
(India) S Jakhar (India) L Saroha	18	21	12
(Malaysia) N M Azriyn A (Malaysia) Lim K W	21	17	21

Second round
PFR	(India) S Prasad (India) S. Sunjith Jr.	17	17
(India) I Bhatnagar (India) K. Sai Pratheek	21	21
6	(India) K P Garaga (India) V G Panjala	15	21	21
(Malaysia) N M Azriyn A (Malaysia) Lim K W	21	17	8

Quarter-finals
(India) I Bhatnagar (India) K. Sai Pratheek	17	18
6	(India) K P Garaga (India) V G Panjala	21	21

=== Bottom half ===
==== Section 3 ====
First round
(India) S Malik (India) P Naitahni
(India) G Deswal (India) S Yadav	w	/	o
(India) T Sharma (India) V K Singh	8	13
7	(France) F Delrue (France) W Villeger	21	21
PFR	(India) A Makhija (India) V G Prasad	21	21
PFR	(India) S Dalal (India) L Malik	14	19
(Norway) T Flåtten (Norway) V Rikheim	21	9
4	(India) Arjun M.R. (India) D Kapila	23	21

Second round
(India) G Deswal (India) S Yadav	13	18
7	(France) F Delrue (France) W Villeger	21	21
PFR	(India) A Makhija (India) V G Prasad
4	(India) Arjun M.R. (India) D Kapila	w	/	o

Quarter-finals
7	(France) F Delrue (France) W Villeger	16	21	19
4	(India) Arjun M.R. (India) D Kapila	21	19	21

==== Section 4 ====
First round
(India) H Mittal (India) S Sharma	w	/	o
PFR	(India) V Chawat (India) S Choudhary
(India) Ravi (India) C Arora	10	6
8	(Malaysia) Man W C (Malaysia) Tee K W	21	21
(India) A Kadam (India) R M Rehan	21	21
(India) B Chakraborty (India) K Chaudhary	15	17
(Sri Lanka) S Dias (Sri Lanka) B Goonethilleka	16	8
2	(Russia) V Ivanov (Russia) I Sozonov	21	21

Second round
(India) H Mittal (India) S Sharma	7	9
8	(Malaysia) Man W C (Malaysia) Tee K W	21	21
(India) A Kadam (India) R M Rehan	9	12
2	(Russia) V Ivanov (Russia) I Sozonov	21	21

Quarter-finals
8	(Malaysia) Man W C (Malaysia) Tee K W	21	21
2	(Russia) V Ivanov (Russia) I Sozonov	13	12

== Women's doubles ==
=== Seeds ===
1. (India) Ashwini Ponnappa / N. Sikki Reddy (withdrew)
2. (Russia) Anastasiia Akchurina / Olga Morozova (quarter-finals)
3. (Thailand) Benyapa Aimsaard / Nuntakarn Aimsaard (withdrew)
4. (India) K. Ashwini Bhat / Shikha Gautam (withdrew)
5. (Malaysia) Vivian Hoo / Lim Chiew Sien (quarter-finals)
6. (France) Anne Tran / Margot Lambert (withdrew)
7. (India) Gayathri Gopichand / Treesa Jolly (final)
8. (Malaysia) Anna Cheong / Teoh Mei Xing (champions)

=== Finals ===
Semi-finals
(India) Haritha Manazhiyil Harinarayanan (India) Ashna Roy	18	7
8	(Malaysia) Anna Cheong (Malaysia) Teoh Mei Xing	21	21
(Malaysia) Low Yeen Yuan (Malaysia) Valeree Siow	21	8	16
7	(India) Gayathri Gopichand (India) Treesa Jolly	17	21	21

Final
8	(Malaysia) Anna Cheong (Malaysia) Teoh Mei Xing	21	21
7	(India) Gayathri Gopichand (India) Treesa Jolly	12	13

=== Top half ===
==== Section 1 ====
First round
PFR	(India) T Deshpande (India) S Mundada	21	21
(India) A Das (India) S Saikia	9	12
(India) S Singh (India) M Yadav
(India) R Jaiswal (India) J A Kowsar	w	/	o
PFR	(India) M Dey (India) U Palit	w	/	o
(India) Ka Gupta (India) Kh Gupta
(India) H M Harinarayanan (India) A Roy	21	21
(India) S Christian (India) L Sharma	18	12

Second round
PFR	(India) T Deshpande (India) S Mundada	21	21
(India) R Jaiswal (India) J A Kowsar	12	13
PFR	(India) M Dey (India) U Palit	18	10
(India) H M Harinarayanan (India) A Roy	21	21

Quarter-finals
PFR	(India) T Deshpande (India) S Mundada	21	24	11
(India) H M Harinarayanan (India) A Roy	13	26	21

==== Section 2 ====
First round
PFR	(India) N Manglam (India) L Srivastava	w	/	d
PFR	(India) A Bishnoi (India) C Khatri	w	/	d
PFR	(India) Nikki Rapria (India) Nishu Rapria	13	9
(India) R V Chickmenhalli (India) A Nayak	21	21
8	(Malaysia) A Cheong (Malaysia) Teoh M X	21	21
PFR	(India) Deethya J G (India) S P Krishnapriya	4	5
PFR	(India) J Ananthakumar (India) D R Balasubramanian	13	13
(India) K Kanwal (India) A Prabhudesai	21	21

Second round
(India) R V Chickmenhalli (India) A Nayak	w	/	o
8	(Malaysia) A Cheong (Malaysia) Teoh M X	21	21
(India) K Kanwal (India) A Prabhudesai	13	18

Quarter-finals
(India) R V Chickmenhalli (India) A Nayak
8	(Malaysia) A Cheong (Malaysia) Teoh M X	w	/	o

=== Bottom half ===
==== Section 3 ====
First round
(India) S S S Lakkamraju (India) S Panda	21	18	21
PFR	(India) P Arora (India) U Hooda	19	21	18
(Malaysia) Go P K (Malaysia) Y Ling	15	12
5	(Malaysia) V Hoo (Malaysia) Lim C S	21	21
(India) M Riza (India) A S Sunil	20	15
(India) S Gurazada (United States) I Jaiswal	22	21
(Malaysia) Low Y Y (Malaysia) V Siow	21	21
PFR	(India) P Singh (India) A Wase	7	8

Second round
(India) S S S Lakkamraju (India) S Panda	13	11
5	(Malaysia) V Hoo (Malaysia) Lim C S	21	21
(India) S Gurazada (United States) I Jaiswal	15	17
(Malaysia) Low Y Y (Malaysia) V Siow	21	21

Quarter-finals
5	(Malaysia) V Hoo (Malaysia) Lim C S	21	15	19
(Malaysia) Low Y Y (Malaysia) V Siow	17	21	21

==== Section 4 ====
First round
(India) D Choudhary (India) Y Jakhar
(India) S Singhi (India) R Thaker	w	/	o
PFR	(India) M Nayak (India) S Singh	1	4
7	(India) G Gopichand (India) T Jolly	21	21
(India) R Mookerjee (India) S Santosh Singh	w	/	o
(India) S Ghorpade (India) S Mishra
(India) D Gautam (India) A Kaushik	3	5
2	(Russia) A Akchurina (Russia) O Morozova	21	21

Second round
(India) S Singhi (India) R Thaker	12	7
7	(India) G Gopichand (India) T Jolly	21	21
(India) R Mookerjee (India) S Santosh Singh	14	9
2	(Russia) A Akchurina (Russia) O Morozova	21	21

Quarter-finals
7	(India) G Gopichand (India) T Jolly	24	21
2	(Russia) A Akchurina (Russia) O Morozova	22	10

== Mixed doubles ==
=== Seeds ===
1. (Russia) Rodion Alimov / Alina Davletova (withdrew)
2. (Malaysia) Chen Tang Jie / Peck Yen Wei (quarter-finals)
3. (England) Callum Hemming / Jessica Pugh (withdrew)
4. (India) Venkat Gaurav Prasad / Juhi Dewangan (second round)
5. (Malaysia) Chan Peng Soon / Valeree Siow (second round)
6. (India) Dhruv Kapila / N. Sikki Reddy (withdrew)
7. (India) Ishaan Bhatnagar / Tanisha Crasto (champions)
8. (France) William Villeger / Anne Tran (quarter-finals)

=== Finals ===
Semi-finals
(India) Arjun M.R. (India) Treesa Jolly	21	18	11
7	(India) Ishaan Bhatnagar (India) Tanisha Crasto	18	21	21
PFR	(India) Akshan Shetty (India) Simran Singhi	21	20	9
PFR	(India) Hema Nagendra Babu Thandarang (India) Srivedya Gurazada	15	22	21

Final
7	(India) Ishaan Bhatnagar (India) Tanisha Crasto	21	21
PFR	(India) Hema Nagendra Babu Thandarang (India) Srivedya Gurazada	16	12

=== Top half ===
==== Section 1 ====
First round
1	(Russia) R Alimov (Russia) A Davletova
(India) S. Sunjith Jr. (India) M Riza	w	/	o
(India) G Deswal (India) A Kaushik	8	13
(India) Arjun M.R. (India) T Jolly	21	21
8	(France) W Villeger (France) A Tran	w	/	o
(India) R Kapoor (India) S Santosh
(Sri Lanka) S Dias (Sri Lanka) T Hendahewa	w	/	o
(India) B Navaneeth (India) R Thaker

Second round
(India) S. Sunjith Jr. (India) M Riza	9	17
(India) Arjun M.R. (India) T Jolly	21	21
8	(France) W Villeger (France) A Tran	27	21
(Sri Lanka) S Dias (Sri Lanka) T Hendahewa	25	14

Quarter-finals
(India) Arjun M.R. (India) T Jolly	24	21
8	(France) W Villeger (France) A Tran	22	17

==== Section 2 ====
First round
4	(India) V G Prasad (India) J Dewangan	21	21
PFR	(India) K Tyagi (India) M Boruah	18	7
(India) S Jakhar (India) M M Bora	14	20
(India) A Surya (India) P P Chimulkar	21	22
7	(India) I Bhatnagar (India) T Crasto	w	/	o
PFR	(India) V Devlekar (India) S Ghorpade
(India) D S Konthoujam (India) P Konjengbam
(India) K. Sai Pratheek (India) G Gopichand	w	/	o

Second round
4	(India) V G Prasad (India) J Dewangan
(India) A Surya (India) P P Chimulkar	w	/	o
7	(India) I Bhatnagar (India) T Crasto	21	26
(India) K. Sai Pratheek (India) G Gopichand	14	24

Quarter-finals
(India) A Surya (India) P P Chimulkar	13	19
7	(India) I Bhatnagar (India) T Crasto	21	21

=== Bottom half ===
==== Section 3 ====
First round
(India) B Yadav (India) S Panda	21	21
(India) K Dhindhwal (India) D Gautam	6	9
PFR	(India) S Gajendran (India) Deethya J G	16	13
5	(Malaysia) Chan P S (Malaysia) V Siow	21	21
(India) C Arora (India) N Rapria	19	9
PFR	(India) A Shetty (India) S Singhi	21	21
(India) K Sharma (India) S Sharma	w	/	o
PFR	(India) M Rana (India) R K Toor

Second round
(India) B Yadav (India) S Panda	w	/	o
5	(Malaysia) Chan P S (Malaysia) V Siow
PFR	(India) A Shetty (India) S Singhi	21	21
(India) K Sharma (India) S Sharma	3	10

Quarter-finals
(India) B Yadav (India) S Panda	15	20
PFR	(India) A Shetty (India) S Singhi	21	22

==== Section 4 ====
First round
PFR	(India) A Makhija (India) D Choudhary	15	16
PFR	(India) H N B Thandarang (India) S Gurazada	21	21
(Singapore) T Hee (Singapore) Tan W H	w	/	d
6	(India) D Kapila (India) N Sikki Reddy	w	/	d
(India) R M Rehan (India) J A Kowsar	13	12
(India) D Rawat (India) S Gautam	21	21
(India) P Ranade (India) K Kanwal	14	12
2	(Malaysia) Chen T J (Malaysia) Peck Y W	21	21

Second round
PFR	(India) H N B Thandarang (India) S Gurazada	w	/	o
(India) D Rawat (India) S Gautam	14	11
2	(Malaysia) Chen T J (Malaysia) Peck Y W	21	21

Quarter-finals
PFR	(India) H N B Thandarang (India) S Gurazada	w	/	o
2	(Malaysia) Chen T J (Malaysia) Peck Y W

Preceded by 2022 India Open	BWF World Tour; 2022 BWF season	Succeeded by 2022 Odisha Open
