= Ashmita Chaliha =

Indian badminton player (born 1999)

Personal information
- Born: 18 October 1999 (age 27) Guwahati, Assam, India
- Years active: 2015–present
- Height: 1.67 m (5 ft 6 in)
- Weight: 52 kg (115 lb)

Sport
- Country: India
- Sport: Badminton
- Handedness: Left

Women's singles
- Career record: 121 wins, 69 losses
- Highest ranking: 30 (27 October 2026)
- Current ranking: 30 (27 October 2026)
- BWF profile
Medal record
Women's badminton
Representing India
Asia Team Championships
Gold medal – first place	2024 Selangor	Women's team
South Asian Games
Gold medal – first place	2019 Kathmandu–Pokhara	Women's singles
Gold medal – first place	2019 Kathmandu–Pokhara	Women's team

Ashmita Chaliha (born 18 October 1999) is an Indian badminton player. She won the gold medal at the 2024 Asia Team Championships. At the 2019 South Asian Games, she secured gold medals in both the women's singles and team events.

== Career ==
=== 2017-2021: early career ===
Ashmita lost in the second round of the 2017 Asian Junior Championships singles event. In the Junior World Championships, she played in the team event, where her team finished 6th, and in the singles event, she made it to the round of 32. Ashmita won the 2018 Tata Open India International tournament, a BWF International Challenge tournament. Then she won the 2018 Dubai International tournament. Ashmita was selected for the Indian team for 2018 Asian Games in the women's team event but the team lost to the eventual gold medallist team Japan in the quarter-finals 1–3. Ashmita was selected for the 2019 Badminton Asia Mixed Team Championships where her team reached the quarter-finals. At the 2019 South Asian Games, Ashmita won the gold medal in the singles event by defeating compatriot Gayathri Gopichand and then in the team event by defeating team of Sri Lanka in the gold medal match.

=== 2022: Rise ===
Ashmita made it to the quarter-finals of the India Open but lost to her compatriot, the legendary P. V. Sindhu (7–21, 18–21). At the Syed Modi International, Ashmita gave a walkover in the first round to compatriot Malvika Bansod. Ashmita reached the semi-finals of the 2022 Odisha Open before losing to Smit Toshniwal. Ashmita was selected for playing at the 2022 Badminton Asia Team Championships. She won both of her matches but overall her team lost both matches of the group stage and eventually unable to reach knockout stage. At the Swiss Open, she entered as a wildcard and reached the second round before losing to seed no.8 Kirsty Gilmour 18–21,20–22. She had a first round exit at the 2022 Orléans Masters losing to Putri Kusuma Wardani 17–21,21–19 and 14–21.

2026: Come Back

On 9 August 2026, Chaliha became the first Indian shuttler to win the Korea Masters, defeating fourth-seeded Han Qianxi of China 14–21, 21–14, 21–14 to claim her maiden BWF World Tour Super 300 title — a remarkable comeback after a career-threatening knee injury two years earlier

== Achievements ==
=== South Asian Games ===
Women's singles
Year	Venue	Opponent	Score	Result
2019	Badminton Covered Hall; Pokhara, Nepal	(India) Gayathri Gopichand	21–18, 25–23	Gold

=== BWF World Tour (1 title) ===
The World Tour was announced in 2017 and implemented in 2018. It is a series of elite badminton tournaments sanctioned by the Badminton World Federation. The tour is divided into levels of Super 1000, Super 750, Super 500, Super 300, and Super 100.

Year	Tournament	Level	Opponent	Score	Result	Ref.
2026	Korea Masters	Super 300	(China) Han Qianxi	14–21, 21–14, 21–14	(gold) Winner	

=== BWF International Challenge/Series (3 titles, 2 runners-up) ===
Women's singles
Year	Tournament	Opponent	Score	Result
2018	Tata Open India International	(India) Vrushali Gummadi	21–16, 21–13	(gold) Winner
2018	Dubai International	(South Korea) Jeon Joo-i	21–19, 21–15	(gold) Winner
2022	Bangladesh International	(India) Aakarshi Kashyap	15–21, 13–21	(silver) Runner-up
2023	Maldives International	(India) Tasnim Mir	19–21, 21–17, 21–11	(gold) Winner
2025 (I)	India International	(India) Mansi Singh	17–21, 20–22	(silver) Runner-up

BWF International Challenge tournament
BWF International Series tournament
BWF Future Series tournament
