= Kiran George =

Indian badminton player (born 2000)

Personal information
- Born: 11 February 2000 (age 26) Kochi, Kerala, India
- Height: 1.74 m (5 ft 9 in)

Sport
- Country: India
- Sport: Badminton
- Handedness: Right
- Coached by: Yoo Yong-sung

Men's singles
- Highest ranking: 34 (7 May 2024)
- Current ranking: 56 (3 November 2026)
- BWF profile
Medal record
Men's badminton
Representing India
Thomas Cup
Bronze medal – third place	2026 Horsens	Men's team

Kiran George (born 11 February 2000) is an Indian badminton player. He has competed in the 2020 Thomas Cup and 2022 Asian Team Championships.

== Career ==
=== 2021–22 ===
In 2021, Kiran George's first tournament played was the Orléans Masters where lost to Brice Leverdez in the 3rd round. In September, Kiran played in the Polish International where he won the tournament beating Jason Teh in the finals winning his first ever tournament since the Ghana International in 2019. He also reached the semis of the Welsh International but lost to Siril Verma.

In 2022, Kiran started the year by playing in 3 BWF world tour tournaments including the India Open Which he lost the first round and the Syed Modi International which he also lost the first round and the Odisha Open which he won the title beating Priyanshu Rajawat to win his first ever BWF World Tour title. He competed at the 2022 Badminton Asia Team Championships but was eliminated at the group stage. First he lost to Korean Kim Joo-wan by the score of 18-21 and 14-21 then he lost to Hong Kong's Chan Yin Chak in the score of 13–21,21-17 and 9-21 and finally Ikhsan Rumbay in the score of 13–21, 21-17 and 10–21.

=== 2023 ===
In Thailand Open BWF Super 500, he pulled off a major upset win against then World No 1 Shi Yuqi of China.

=== 2025 ===
In India Open BWF Super 750, he reached the quarterfinals by defeating the errorless 18 year old Frenchmen Alex Lanier.

== Achievements ==
=== World Tour (3 titles) ===
The BWF World Tour, which was announced on 19 March 2017 and implemented in 2018, is a series of elite badminton tournaments sanctioned by the Badminton World Federation (BWF). The BWF World Tour is divided into levels of World Tour Finals, Super 1000, Super 750, Super 500, Super 300 (part of the HSBC World Tour), and the BWF Tour Super 100.

Year	Tournament	Level	Opponent	Score	Result
2022	Odisha Masters	Super 100	(India) Priyanshu Rajawat	21–15, 14–21, 21–18	(gold) Winner
2023	Indonesia Masters (I)	Super 100	(Japan) Koo Takahashi	21–19, 22–20	(gold) Winner
2025	Odisha Masters	Super 100	(Indonesia) Muhamad Yusuf	21–14, 13–21, 21–16	(gold) Winner

=== International Challenge / Series (3 titles, 1 runner-up) ===
Year	Tournament	Opponent	Score	Result
2019	Ghana International	(Azerbaijan) Ade Resky Dwicahyo	25–23, 21–19	(gold) Winner
2021	Polish International	(Singapore) Jason Teh	13–21, 21–14, 21–13	(gold) Winner
2022	Polish Open	(Chinese Taipei) Lee Chia-hao	21–15, 21–14	(gold) Winner
2022	Denmark Masters	(Chinese Taipei) Lu Chia-hung	18–21, 11–21	(silver) Runner-up

BWF International Challenge tournament
BWF International Series tournament
