= Anna Cheong =

Malaysian badminton player (born 1998)

Anna Cheong 张清玉
Personal information
- Born: Anna Cheong Ching Yik; 15 March 1998 (age 28) Malacca, Malaysia
- Height: 1.59 m (5 ft 3 in)

Sport
- Country: Malaysia
- Sport: Badminton
- Handedness: Left
- Coached by: Hoon Thien How

Women's doubles
- Highest ranking: 17 (with Teoh Mei Xing, 3 January 2023)
- Current ranking: 53 (with Teoh Mei Xing, 16 January 2024)
- BWF profile
Medal record
Women's badminton
Representing Malaysia
Asia Team Championships
Bronze medal – third place	2022 Selangor	Women's team

Anna Cheong Ching Yik (Chinese: 張清玉; pinyin: Zhāng Qīngyù; born 15 March 1998) is a Malaysian badminton player. She won her first international title at the 2021 Czech Open in the women's doubles together with Teoh Mei Xing, and they won their first World Tour title at the 2022 Syed Modi International.

== Achievements ==
=== BWF World Tour (1 title) ===
The BWF World Tour, which was announced on 19 March 2017 and implemented in 2018, is a series of elite badminton tournaments sanctioned by the Badminton World Federation (BWF). The BWF World Tours are divided into levels of World Tour Finals, Super 1000, Super 750, Super 500, Super 300 (part of the HSBC World Tour), and the BWF Tour Super 100.

Women's doubles
Year	Tournament	Level	Partner	Opponent	Score	Result
2022	Syed Modi International	Super 300	(Malaysia) Teoh Mei Xing	(India) Gayatri Gopichand (India) Treesa Jolly	21–12, 21–13	(gold) Winner

=== BWF International Challenge/Series (1 title, 3 runners-up) ===
Women's doubles
Year	Tournament	Partner	Opponent	Score	Result
2017	Lao International	(Indonesia) Ririn Amelia	(Thailand) Kittipak Dubthuk (Thailand) Natcha Saengchote	11–21, 17–21	(silver) Runner-up
2021	Austrian Open	(Malaysia) Yap Cheng Wen	(Indonesia) Ni Ketut Mahadewi Istarani (Indonesia) Serena Kani	11–21, 16–21	(silver) Runner-up
2021	Czech Open	(Malaysia) Teoh Mei Xing	(Indonesia) Febby Valencia Dwijayanti Gani (Indonesia) Jesita Putri Miantoro	21–15, 16–21, 21–17	(gold) Winner
2021	Scottish Open	(Malaysia) Teoh Mei Xing	(Canada) Rachel Honderich (Canada) Kristen Tsai	14–21, 12–21	(silver) Runner-up

BWF International Challenge tournament
BWF International Series tournament
BWF Future Series tournament
