= Ishaan Bhatnagar =

Indian badminton player (born 2002)

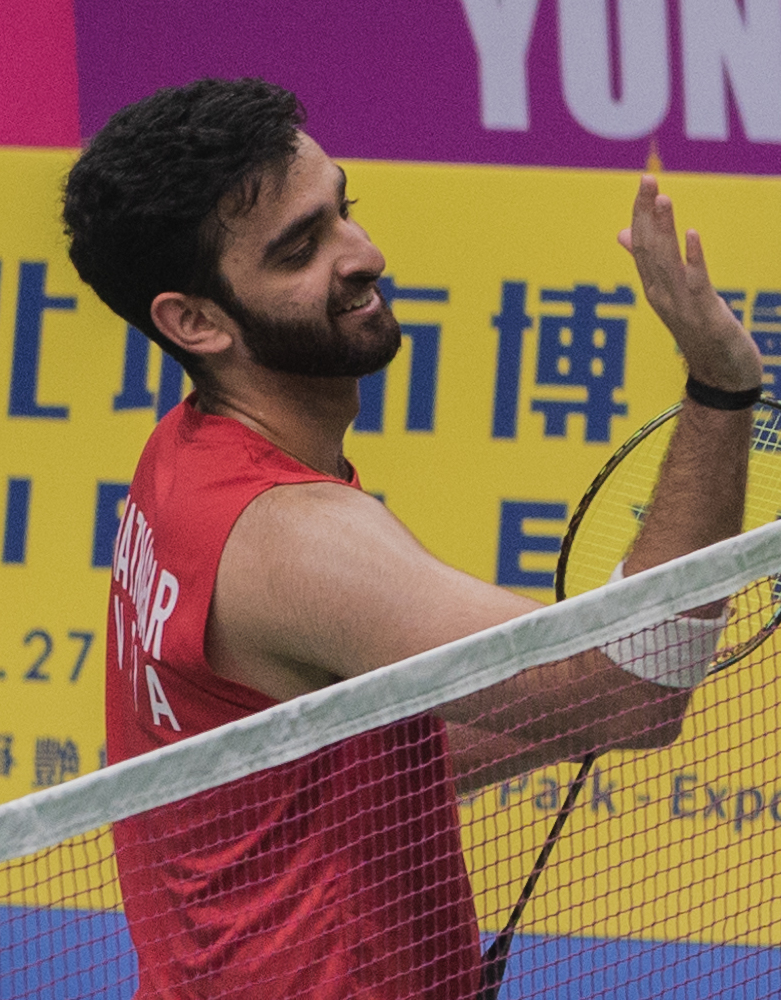
- Bhatnagar at the 2022 Taipei Open

Personal information
- Born: 2 February 2002 (age 24) Raipur, Chhattisgarh, India
- Height: 5 ft 10 in (178 cm)

Sport
- Country: India
- Sport: Badminton
- Handedness: Right

Men's & mixed doubles
- Highest ranking: 42 (MD with Sai Pratheek K. 22 November 2022); 18 (XD with Tanisha Crasto 3 January 2023)
- Current ranking: 64 (XD with Shruti Mishra, 3 November 2026)
- BWF profile
Medal record
Men's badminton
Representing India
Asia Mixed Team Championships
Bronze medal – third place	2023 Dubai	Mixed team

Ishaan Bhatnagar (born 2 February 2002) is an Indian badminton player.

== Achievements ==
=== World Tour (1 title) ===
The BWF World Tour, which was announced on 19 March 2017 and implemented in 2018, is a series of elite badminton tournaments sanctioned by the Badminton World Federation (BWF). The BWF World Tours are divided into levels of World Tour Finals, Super 1000, Super 750, Super 500, Super 300 (part of the BWF World Tour), and the BWF Tour Super 100.

Mixed doubles
Year	Tournament	Level	Partner	Opponent	Score	Result
2022	Syed Modi International	Super 300	(India) Tanisha Crasto	(India) T. Hema Nagendra Babu (India) Srivedya Gurazada	21–16, 21–12	(gold) Winner

=== International Challenge / Series (7 titles, 3 runners-up) ===
Men's doubles
Year	Tournament	Partner	Opponent	Score	Result
2021	Ukraine International	(India) Sai Pratheek K.	(Malaysia) Junaidi Arif (Malaysia) Muhammad Haikal	15–21, 21–19, 15–21	(silver) Runner-up
2021	Polish International	(India) Sai Pratheek K.	(England) Rory Easton (England) Zach Russ	21–18, 27–25	(gold) Winner
2022 (II)	India International	(India) Sai Pratheek K.	(India) Krishna Prasad Garaga (India) Vishnuvardhan Goud Panjala	17–21, 21–15, 23–21	(gold) Winner

Mixed doubles
Year	Tournament	Partner	Opponent	Score	Result
2021	India International	(India) Tanisha Crasto	(India) Sai Pratheek K. (India) Gayatri Gopichand	21–16, 21–19	(gold) Winner
2021	Scottish Open	(India) Tanisha Crasto	(England) Callum Hemming (England) Jessica Pugh	15–21, 17–21	(silver) Runner-up
2025	Iran Fajr International	(India) Srinidhi Narayanan	(Turkey) Emre Sönmez (Turkey) Yasemen Bektaş	16–21, 21–17, 21–14	(gold) Winner
2025	Uganda International	(India) Srinidhi Narayanan	(India) Dhruv Rawat (India) K. Maneesha	21–18, 9–3 retired	(gold) Winner
2025 (II)	India International	(India) Aradhana Balachandra	(India) Sathwik Reddy Kanapuram (India) Reshika Uthayasooriyan	20–22, 8–21	(silver) Runner-up
2026	Uganda International	(India) Shruti Mishra	(India) Nithin H. V. (India) Srinidhi Narayanan	13–21, 21–19, 1–0 retired	(gold) Winner
2026	Réunion Open	(India) Shruti Mishra	(France) Grégoire Deschamp (Denmark) Iben Bergstein	21–17, 21–19	(gold) Winner

BWF International Challenge tournament
BWF International Series tournament
BWF Future Series tournament

=== Junior International (2 runners-up) ===
Boys' doubles
Year	Tournament	Partner	Opponent	Score	Result
2019	Bulgarian Junior International	(India) Vishnuvardhan Goud Panjala	(England) William Jones (England) Brandon Zhi Hao Yap	21–19, 21–18	(silver) Runner-up

Mixed doubles
Year	Tournament	Partner	Opponent	Score	Result
2019	India Junior International	(India) Tanisha Crasto	(Thailand) Benyapa Aimsaard (Thailand) Ratchapol Makkasasithorn	12–21, 22–20, 20–22	(silver) Runner-up

BWF Junior International Grand Prix tournament
BWF Junior International Challenge tournament
BWF Junior International Series tournament
BWF Junior Future Series tournament
