= Malvika Bansod =

Indian badminton player (born 2001)

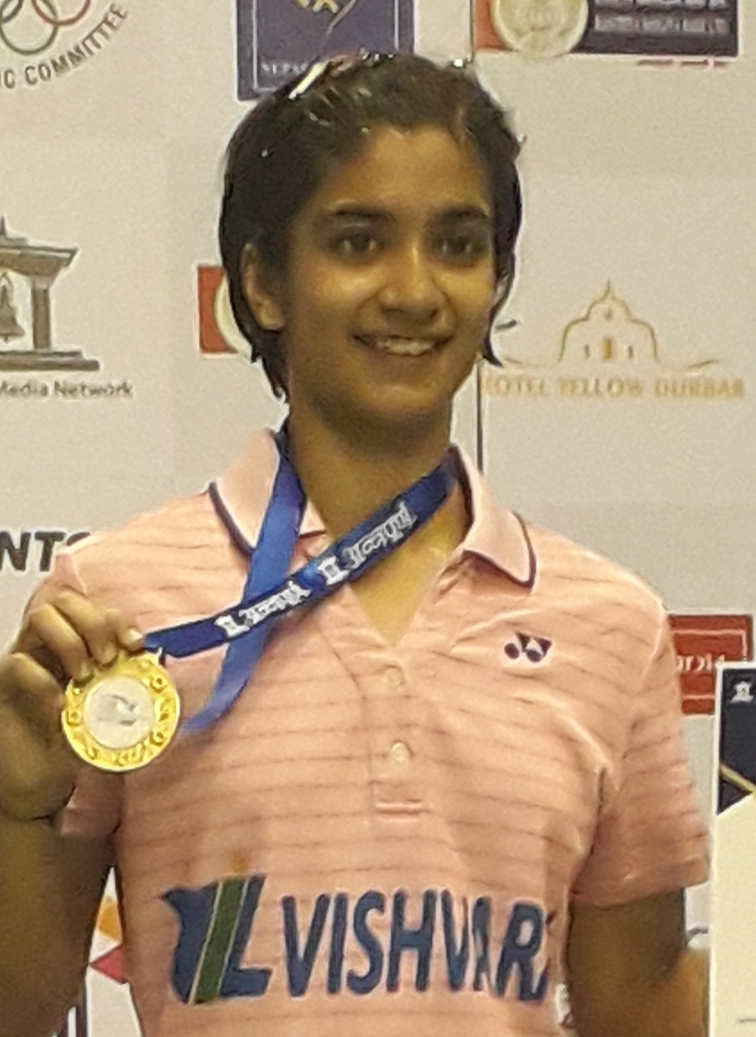
- Bansod in 2019

Personal information
- Born: 15 September 2001 (age 25) Nagpur, Maharashtra, India
- Years active: 2019–present

Sport
- Country: India
- Sport: Badminton
- Handedness: Left
- Coached by: Vignesh Devlekar

Women's singles
- Career record: 99 wins, 79 losses
- Highest ranking: 22 (1 April 2025)
- Current ranking: 48 (3 November 2026)
- BWF profile

Malvika Bansod (born 15 September 2001) is an Indian badminton player who plays for the national team.

== Early life ==
Bansod was born on 15 September 2001 in Nagpur, Maharashtra. She studied at Mother's Pet Kindergarten and Centre Point School, Nagpur. She took up badminton when she was eight years old. Her mother is a dentist.

== Career ==
=== Beginnings (2018–2019) ===
Bansod won titles at state championships in the U-13 and U-17 age groups. In 2018, she won selection tournaments to represent India at the World Junior Championship in Canada. In December 2018, she was the winner at the South Asian Regional U-21 Championship at Kathmandu Nepal, both in individual and team events. In 2019, she won the All India senior and junior ranking tournaments. In the same year, she won a bronze medal at the Bulgarian Junior International Championship.

=== Senior international debut (2019) ===
Bansod made her senior international debut in September and won the Maldives International Future Series tournament. She then won the Annapurna Post International Series in Nepal. She won a bronze at the Bahrain International Series in October.

=== Rise in ranking (2021–2025) ===
In 2021, Bansod played the Austrian Open International Series but was defeated by Clara Azurmendi in the quarterfinal. In 2022, she played her first BWF Super 500 tournament at the 2022 India Open, where she beat icon Saina Nehwal and progressed to the quarterfinals. She then participated in the 2022 Syed Modi International, where she progressed to the finals. She lost in the finals in straight games to P. V. Sindhu. In the 2022 Odisha Open, she made it to the semi-finals, which she lost to Unnati Hooda in two close games. With her consistent results in these three tournaments, she attained a career-high world ranking of 61. In 2024, Bansod reached the final of Hylo Open but lost to Mia Blichfeldt and finished as the runner up.

== Achievements ==
=== World Tour (2 runners-up) ===
The BWF World Tour, which was announced in March 2017 and implemented in 2018, is a series of elite badminton tournaments sanctioned by the Badminton World Federation. The BWF World Tours are divided into levels of World Tour Finals, Super 1000, Super 750, Super 500, Super 300 (part of the BWF World Tour), and the BWF Tour Super 100.

Women's singles
Year	Tournament	Level	Opponent	Score	Result
2022	Syed Modi International	Super 300	(India) P. V. Sindhu	13–21, 16–21	(silver) Runner-up
2024	Hylo Open	Super 300	(Denmark) Mia Blichfeldt	10–21, 15–21	(silver) Runner-up

=== International Challenge / Series (5 titles, 1 runner-up) ===
Women's singles
Year	Tournament	Opponent	Score	Result
2019	Maldives International	(Myanmar) Thet Htar Thuzar	21–13, 21–11	(gold) Winner
2019	Nepal International	(India) Gayatri Gopichand	21–14, 21–8	(gold) Winner
2021	Uganda International	(India) Anupama Upadhyaya	17–21, 25–23, 21–10	(gold) Winner
2021	Lithuanian International	(Republic of Ireland) Rachael Darragh	21–14, 21–11	(gold) Winner
2022	Italian International	(Chinese Taipei) Hsu Wen-chi	9–21, 11–21	(silver) Runner-up
2024	Azerbaijan International	(India) Tanya Hemanth	21–15, 22–20	(gold) Winner

BWF International Challenge tournament
BWF International Series tournament
BWF Future Series tournament

== See also ==
- Badminton in India
- India national badminton team
