= Krishna Prasad Garaga =

Indian badminton player (born 2000)

Personal information
- Born: 15 March 2000 (age 26) Kakinada, India

Sport
- Country: India
- Sport: Badminton
- Handedness: Right
- Coached by: Mathias Boe

Men's doubles
- Highest ranking: 31 (with Vishnuvardhan Goud Panjala 17 January 2023)
- BWF profile
Medal record
Men's badminton
Representing India
Thomas Cup
Gold medal – first place	2022 Bangkok	Men's team
Asia Mixed Team Championships
Bronze medal – third place	2023 Dubai	Mixed team
South Asian Games
Gold medal – first place	2019 Kathmandu–Pokhara	Men's doubles
Gold medal – first place	2019 Kathmandu–Pokhara	Men's team

Krishna Prasad Garaga (born 15 March 2000) is an Indian badminton player. He was the gold medalist at the 2019 South Asian Games in the men's doubles and team events. He was part of the India team that won the 2022 Thomas Cup.

== Achievements ==
=== South Asian Games ===
Men's doubles
Year	Venue	Partner	Opponent	Score	Result
2019	Badminton Covered Hall; Pokhara, Nepal	(India) Dhruv Kapila	(Sri Lanka) Sachin Dias (Sri Lanka) Buwaneka Goonethilleka	21–19, 19–21, 21–18	Gold

=== BWF World Tour (3 runners-up) ===
The BWF World Tour, which was announced on 19 March 2017 and implemented in 2018, is a series of elite badminton tournaments sanctioned by the Badminton World Federation (BWF). The BWF World Tours are divided into levels of World Tour Finals, Super 1000, Super 750, Super 500, Super 300 (part of the HSBC World Tour), and the BWF Tour Super 100.

Men's doubles
Year	Tournament	Level	Partner	Opponent	Score	Result
2021	Orléans Masters	Super 100	(India) Vishnuvardhan Goud Panjala	(England) Ben Lane (England) Sean Vendy	18–21, 15–21	(silver) Runner-up
2022	Syed Modi International	Super 300	(India) Vishnuvardhan Goud Panjala	(Malaysia) Man Wei Chong (Malaysia) Tee Kai Wun	13–21, 16–21	(silver) Runner-up
2023	Odisha Masters	Super 100	(India) Sai Pratheek K.	(Chinese Taipei) Lin Bing-wei (Chinese Taipei) Su Ching-heng	22–20, 18–21, 17–21	(silver) Runner-up

=== BWF International Challenge/Series (7 titles, 3 runners-up) ===
Men's doubles
Year	Tournament	Partner	Opponent	Score	Result
2018	Kharkiv International	(India) Dhruv Kapila	(Germany) Daniel Hess (Germany) Johannes Pistorius	21–19, 21–16	(gold) Winner
2021	India International	(India) Vishnuvardhan Goud Panjala	(India) Arun George (India) Sanyam Shukla	24–22, 13–21, 22–20	(gold) Winner
2022 (II)	India International	(India) Vishnuvardhan Goud Panjala	(India) Ishaan Bhatnagar (India) Sai Pratheek K.	21–17, 15–21, 21–23	(silver) Runner-up
2023	Réunion Open	(India) Vishnuvardhan Goud Panjala	(Germany) Matthias Kicklitz (Germany) Max Weißkirchen	21–18, 21–12	(gold) Winner
2023	Bahrain International	(India) Sai Pratheek K.	(Japan) Kazuki Shibata (Japan) Naoki Yamada	21–16, 17–21, 15–21	(silver) Runner-up
2024	Iran Fajr International	(India) Sai Pratheek K.	(Mexico) Job Castillo (Mexico) Luis Montoya	21–18, 21–19	(gold) Winner
2026	Vietnam International	(India) Pruthvi Roy	(Chinese Taipei) Huang Tsung-i (Chinese Taipei) Lin Ting-yu	24–26, 21–17, 18–21	(silver) Runner-up
2026	Mexican International	(India) Pruthvi Roy	(Canada) Hugo Pong (Canada) Kern Pong	21–18, 21–19	(gold) Winner
2026	Réunion Open	(India) Pruthvi Roy	(India) Suraj Goala (India) Dhruv Rawat	22–20, 22–24, 21–18	(gold) Winner
2026 (II)	India International	(India) Pruthvi Roy	(India) Sai Pratheek K. (India) Ruban Kumar	21–12, 21–18	(gold) Winner

BWF International Challenge tournament
BWF International Series tournament
BWF Future Series tournament

=== BWF Junior International (1 title, 4 runners-up) ===
Boys' doubles
Year	Tournament	Partner	Opponent	Score	Result
2014	India Junior International	(India) Satwiksairaj Rankireddy	(India) Arjun M. R. (India) Chirag Shetty	7–11, 10–11, 6–11	(silver) Runner-up
2015	India Junior International	(India) Satwiksairaj Rankireddy	(Thailand) W Sarapat (Thailand) Panachai Worasaktayanan	21–15, 21–17	(gold) Winner
2016	India Junior International	(India) Dhruv Kapila	(Japan) Hiroki Okamura (Japan) Masayuki Onodera	5–11, 14–12, 9–11, 11–13	(silver) Runner-up
2017	Dutch Junior International	(India) Dhruv Kapila	(Chinese Taipei) Su Li-wei (Chinese Taipei) Ye Hong-wei	13–21, 19–21	(silver) Runner-up
2018	Dutch Junior International	(India) Dhruv Kapila	(China) Liang Weikeng (China) Shang Yichen	20–22, 16–21	(silver) Runner-up

BWF Junior International Grand Prix tournament
BWF Junior International Challenge tournament
BWF Junior International Series tournament
BWF Junior Future Series tournament
