= Srivedya Gurazada =

American badminton player (born 2002)

Personal information
- Born: 15 August 2002 (age 24) Boston, Massachusetts, U.S.

Sport
- Country: India (2019–2022); United States (2022–present)
- Sport: Badminton

Women's singles, women's doubles, mixed doubles
- Highest ranking: 34 (WD with Ishika Jaiswal, 17 January 2023); 97 (XD with T. Hema Nagendra Babu, 15 Nov 2022); 167 (WS, 15 Nov 2022)
- Current ranking: 34 (WD with Ishika Jaiswal); 129 (XD with T. Hema Nagendra Babu); 160 (WS) (17 January 2023)
- BWF profile

Srivedya Gurazada (born 15 August 2002) is an American badminton player. She trains at the Chetan Anand Badminton Academy in Hyderabad. She formerly represented India and won her first BWF title in women's doubles at Mexico Open in 2021.

== Achievements ==
=== BWF World Tour (1 runner-up) ===
The BWF World Tour, which was announced on 19 March 2017 and implemented in 2018, is a series of elite badminton tournaments sanctioned by the Badminton World Federation (BWF). The BWF World Tour is divided into levels of World Tour Finals, Super 1000, Super 750, Super 500, Super 300 and the BWF Tour Super 100.

Mixed doubles
Year	Tournament	Level	Partner	Opponent	Score	Result
2022	Syed Modi International	Super 300	(India) T. Hema Nagendra Babu	(India) Ishaan Bhatnagar (India) Tanisha Crasto	16–21, 12–21	(silver) Runner-up

=== BWF International Challenge/Series (2 titles, 1 runner-up) ===
Women's doubles
Year	Tournament	Partner	Opponent	Score	Result	Ref.
2021	Mexican Open	(United States) Ishika Jaiswal	(Canada) Crystal Lai (Canada) Alexandra Mocanu	20–22, 21–17 21–16	(gold) Winner	
2022	Cameroon International	(India) Poorvisha S. Ram	(Malaysia) Kasturi Radhakrishnan (Malaysia) Venosha Radhakrishnan	21–12, 21–14	(gold) Winner	
2023	Mauritius International	(United States) Ishika Jaiswal	(Japan) Natsumi Takasaki (Japan) Mai Tanabe	4–21, 14–21	(silver) Runner-up	

BWF International Challenge tournament
BWF International Series tournament
BWF Future Series tournament
