= Vishnuvardhan Goud Panjala =

Indian badminton player

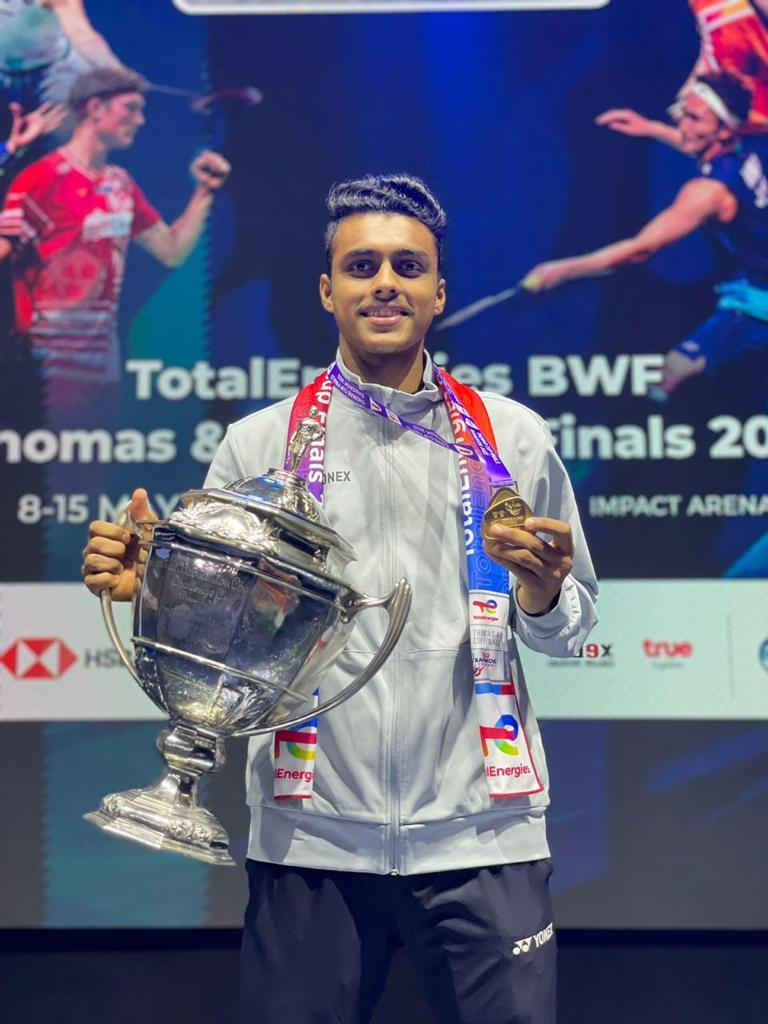
- Vishnuvardhan with Thomas cup trophy

Personal information
- Born: 11 February 2001 (age 25)
- Height: 6 ft (183 cm)

Sport
- Country: India
- Sport: Badminton
- Handedness: Right
- Coached by: Mathias Boe

Men's doubles
- Highest ranking: 31 (with Krishna Prasad Garaga 17 January 2023)
- BWF profile
Medal record
Men's badminton
Representing India
Thomas Cup
| Gold medal – first place | 2022 Bangkok | Men's team |
Asia Mixed Team Championships
| Bronze medal – third place | 2023 Dubai | Mixed team |

Vishnuvardhan Goud Panjala (born 11 February 2001) is an Indian badminton player. He was part of the India team that won the 2022 Thomas Cup He is currently ranked 32 in the world ranking in the men's doubles event.

== Achievements ==
=== BWF World Tour (2 runners-up) ===
The BWF World Tour, which was announced on 19 March 2017 and implemented in 2018, is a series of elite badminton tournaments sanctioned by the Badminton World Federation (BWF). The BWF World Tour is divided into levels of World Tour Finals, Super 1000, Super 750, Super 500, Super 300, and the BWF Tour Super 100.

Men's doubles
| Year | Tournament | Level | Partner | Opponent | Score | Result | Ref. |
|---|---|---|---|---|---|---|---|
| 2021 | Orléans Masters | Super 100 | (India) Krishna Prasad Garaga | (England) Ben Lane (England) Sean Vendy | 21–19, 14–21, 19–21 | (silver) Runner-up | |
| 2022 | Syed Modi International | Super 300 | (India) Krishna Prasad Garaga | (Malaysia) Man Wei Chong (Malaysia) Tee Kai Wun | 13–21, 16–21 | (silver) Runner-up | |

=== BWF International Challenge/Series (4 titles, 2 runners-up) ===
Men's doubles
| Year | Tournament | Partner | Opponent | Score | Result | Ref. |
|---|---|---|---|---|---|---|
| 2021 | India International | (India) Krishna Prasad Garaga | (India) Arun George (India) Sanyam Shukla | 24–22, 13–21, 22–20 | (gold) Winner | |
| 2022 (II) | India International | (India) Krishna Prasad Garaga | (India) Ishaan Bhatnagar (India) Sai Pratheek K. | 21–17, 15–21, 21–23 | (silver) Runner-up | |
| 2023 | Réunion Open | (India) Krishna Prasad Garaga | (Germany) Matthias Kicklitz (Germany) Max Weißkirchen | 21–18, 21–12 | (gold) Winner | |
| 2024 | Lagos International | (India) Pruthvi Roy | (India) P. S. Ravikrishna (India) Akshan Shetty | 21–17, 21–19 | (gold) Winner | |
| 2024 (I) | India International | (India) Arjun M. R. | (India) Pruthvi Roy (India) Sai Pratheek K. | 19–21, 17–21 | (silver) Runner-up | |
| 2025 | Iran Fajr International | (India) Arjun M. R. | (United Arab Emirates) Dev Ayyappan (United Arab Emirates) Dhiren Ayyappan | 21–16, 21–17 | (gold) Winner | |

BWF International Challenge tournament
BWF International Series tournament
BWF Future Series tournament

=== BWF Junior International (1 runner-up) ===
Boys' doubles
| Year | Tournament | Partner | Opponent | Score | Result |
|---|---|---|---|---|---|
| 2019 | Bulgarian Junior International | (India) Ishaan Bhatnagar | (England) William Jones (England) Brandon Zhi Hao Yap | 21–19, 21–18 | (silver) Runner-up |

BWF Junior International Grand Prix tournament
BWF Junior International Challenge tournament
BWF Junior International Series tournament
BWF Junior Future Series tournament
