= Aakarshi Kashyap =

Indian badminton player

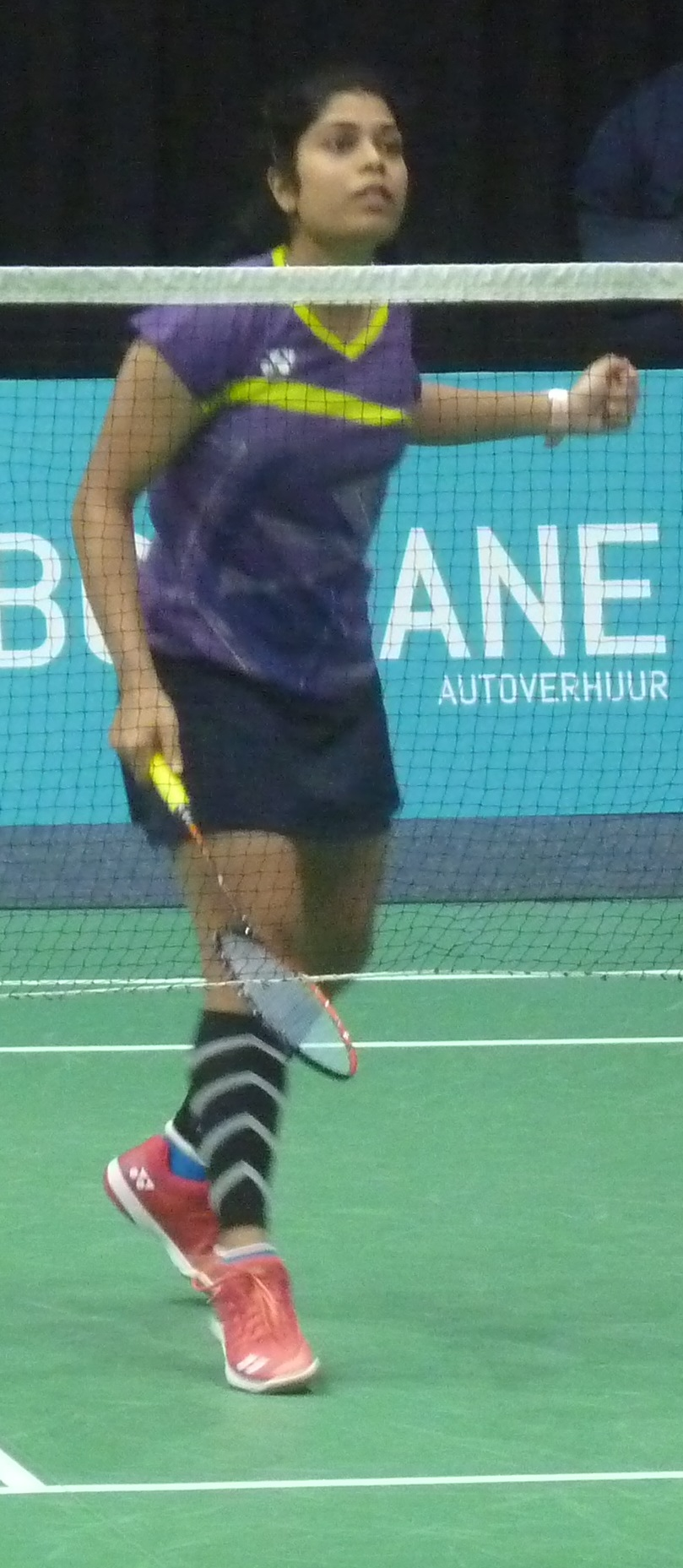

Personal information
- Born: 24 August 2001 (age 25) Durg, Chhattisgarh, India
- Height: 1.59 m (5 ft 3 in)
- Weight: 60 kg (132 lb)

Sport
- Country: India
- Sport: Badminton
- Handedness: right

Women's singles
- Career record: 113 wins, 73 losses
- Highest ranking: 32 (27 December 2022)
- Current ranking: 68 (6 October 2026)
- BWF profile
Medal record
Women's badminton
Representing India
Commonwealth Games
Silver medal – second place	2022 Birmingham	Mixed team
Asia Mixed Team Championships
Bronze medal – third place	2023 Dubai	Mixed team
South Asian Games
Gold medal – first place	2019 Kathmandu-Pokhara	Women's team

Aakarshi Kashyap (born 24 August 2001) is an Indian badminton player. She was selected to be part of the Indian team at the 2018 Asian Games. She was part of the national women's team that won the gold medal in 2019 South Asian Games.

== Biography ==
=== Early life and training ===
Aakarshi Kashyap was born on 24 August 2001 in Bhilai, Chhattisgarh to Sanjeev Kashyap, a medical doctor, and Amita Kashyap. She has a younger brother named Shreyash. Aakarshi studied in Delhi Public School, Durg. Her father encouraged her to improve her fitness and physical training. She pursued her Bachelor of Arts degree at Seth Sugan Chand Surana College in Durg.

Aakarshi started playing badminton in 2009 under Coach Sanjay Mishra at Ravi Shankar Stadium in Durg. She used to train by herself at the badminton courts of Bhilai Steel Plant.

=== 2014–2016 ===
Kashyap's first win was at the All India Ranking Tournament in Sivakasi on August 24, 2014. She won the nationals title at Vishakhapatnam in November 2015.

On 28 April 2016, Kashyap won the twin crowns in the U-15 and U-17 girls' single category at the PNB MetLife Junior Badminton Championship Season 2 National Finals.

In 2016, Kashyap began training in Prakash Padukone Academy in Bengaluru. She stayed with her mother in an accommodation sponsored by Olympic Gold Quest, a non-profit organization. Kashyap claimed twin crowns in the U-17 and U-19 girls' singles in the 25th Krishna Khaitan Memorial All India Junior Ranking Badminton Tournament organized by Express Shuttle Club on October 16, 2016.

Also in 2016, Kashyap was selected to represent India in the Badminton Asia U-15 and U-17 junior championships, held at Kudus, Indonesia, where she bagged a bronze medal.

=== 2017–2018 ===
In November 2017 Kashyap lost against London Games bronze medallist Saina Nehwal in the senior National Badminton Championship. But this match drew her into the spotlight. In December 2017 she scored a double win at the 42nd Junior National Badminton Championship (U-17, U-19) held in Guwahati.

In January 2018 she won the top prize at the Yonex-Sunrise All India Senior Ranking badminton tournament in Bengaluru. Kashyap was made to fight hard for her win in the final against Gayathri Gopichand, prevailing in the final decider after a 63-minute marathon match 21–17, 12–21, 21–9.

In the Khelo Indian School Games held in January 2018, Kashyap won in the U-17 match. India's ranked player won the girls' singles title of the Yonex sunrise all India junior ranking badminton tournament in May 2018.

=== 2019–present ===
In 2019, Kashyap continued her form by taking top honours gain in the domestic singles event at the Yonex Sunrise All India Senior Ranking tournament in Vijayawada, India. She defeated Anura Prabhudesai in the final with a 21–12, 21–16 victory.

In 2020, Kashyap began practicing at the Suchitra Badminton Academy in Hyderabad. The ace shuttler from Chhattisgarh won the title in the women's singles category at Kenya International 2020, which is the BWF Future Series event.

In December 2021, Kashyap once again clinched the women's singles titles at the All India Ranking tournament. Kashyap defended her title by defeating qualifier Tanya Hemanth in straight games in the final 21–15, 21–12. In 2022 she defeated Ashmitia Chaliha in BAI selection trials to qualify for the Uber Cup team and Asian and Commonwealth games in individual and team event.

== Achievements ==
=== BWF International Challenge/Series (4 titles, 6 runners-up) ===
Women's singles
Year	Tournament	Opponent	Score	Result
2018	Bulgarian International	(Spain) Sara Peñalver Pereira	19–21, 11–21	(silver) Runner-up
2020	Uganda International	(Myanmar) Thet Htar Thuzar	14–21, 21–16, 18–21	(silver) Runner-up
2020	Kenya International	(India) Anupama Upadhyaya	21–15, 21–6	(gold) Winner
2022	Maldives International	(India) Ira Sharma	24–22, 21–12	(gold) Winner
2022	Bangladesh International	(India) Ashmita Chaliha	21–15, 21–13	(gold) Winner
2024	Uganda International	(India) Shruti Mundada	25–23, 21–18	(gold) Winner
2025	Lagos International	(India) Shreya Lele	15–21, 17–21	(silver) Runner-up
2026	Réunion Open	(India) Tasnim Mir	11–21, 20–22	(silver) Runner-up
2026	Dutch Open	(Germany) Yvonne Li	9–21, 6–21	(silver) Runner-up
2026	Türkiye International	(India) Anmol Kharb	11–21, 14–21	(silver) Runner-up

BWF International Challenge tournament
BWF International Series tournament
BWF Future Series tournament
