= Dhruv Kapila =

Indian badminton player (born 2000)

Personal information
- Born: 1 February 2000 (age 26) Ludhiana, Punjab, India
- Years active: 2016–present

Sport
- Country: India
- Sport: Badminton
- Handedness: Right
- Coached by: Pullela Gopichand; Tan Kim Her; Manu Attri

Men's & mixed doubles
- Highest ranking: 19 (MD with Arjun M. R., 25 October 2022); 16 (XD with Tanisha Crasto, 27 May 2025)
- Current ranking: 24 (XD with Tanisha Crasto, 10 November 2026)
- BWF profile
Medal record
Men's badminton
Representing India
Thomas Cup
| Gold medal – first place | 2022 Bangkok | Men's team |
| Bronze medal – third place | 2026 Horsens | Men's team |
Asian Games
| Silver medal – second place | 2022 Hangzhou | Men's team |
| Bronze medal – third place | 2026 Aichi–Nagoya | Men's team |
Asia Mixed Team Championships
| Bronze medal – third place | 2023 Dubai | Mixed team |
Asia Team Championships
| Bronze medal – third place | 2020 Manila | Men's team |
South Asian Games
| Gold medal – first place | 2019 Kathmandu–Pokhara | Men's doubles |
| Gold medal – first place | 2019 Kathmandu–Pokhara | Mixed doubles |
| Gold medal – first place | 2019 Kathmandu–Pokhara | Men's team |

Dhruv Kapila (born 1 February 2000) is an Indian badminton player. He won the gold at the 2019 South Asian Games in the men's, mixed doubles and team events. He was part of the team that won the 2022 Thomas Cup.

== Achievements ==
=== South Asian Games ===
Men's doubles
| Year | Venue | Partner | Opponent | Score | Result |
|---|---|---|---|---|---|
| 2019 | Badminton Covered Hall; Pokhara, Nepal | (India) Krishna Prasad Garaga | (Sri Lanka) Sachin Dias (Sri Lanka) Buwaneka Goonethilleka | 21–19, 19–21, 21–18 | Gold |

Mixed doubles
| Year | Venue | Partner | Opponent | Score | Result |
|---|---|---|---|---|---|
| 2019 | Badminton Covered Hall; Pokhara, Nepal | (India) Meghana Jakkampudi | (Sri Lanka) Sachin Dias (Sri Lanka) Thilini Hendahewa | 21–16, 21–14 | Gold |

=== BWF World Tour (1 title, 1 runner-up) ===
The BWF World Tour, which was announced on 19 March 2017 and implemented in 2018, is a series of elite badminton tournaments sanctioned by the Badminton World Federation (BWF). The BWF World Tours are divided into levels of World Tour Finals, Super 1000, Super 750, Super 500, Super 300, and the BWF Tour Super 100.

Mixed doubles
| Year | Tournament | Level | Partner | Opponent | Score | Result |
|---|---|---|---|---|---|---|
| 2023 | Odisha Masters | Super 100 | (India) Tanisha Crasto | (Singapore) Terry Hee (Singapore) Jessica Tan | 17–21, 21–19, 23–21 | (gold) Winner |
| 2024 | Syed Modi International | Super 300 | (India) Tanisha Crasto | (Thailand) Dechapol Puavaranukroh (Thailand) Supissara Paewsampran | 21–18, 14–21, 8–21 | (silver) Runner-up |

=== BWF International Challenge/Series (4 titles, 3 runners-up) ===
Men's doubles
| Year | Tournament | Partner | Opponent | Score | Result |
|---|---|---|---|---|---|
| 2016 | Mauritius International | (India) Saurabh Sharma | (India) Satwiksairaj Rankireddy (India) Chirag Shetty | 12–21, 16–21 | (silver) Runner-up |
| 2018 | Kharkiv International | (India) Krishna Prasad Garaga | (Germany) Daniel Hess (Germany) Johannes Pistorius | 21–19, 21–16 | (gold) Winner |
| 2019 | Nepal International | (India) Arjun M. R. | (India) Manu Attri (India) B. Sumeeth Reddy | 19–21, 15–21 | (silver) Runner-up |
| 2019 | Bangladesh International | (India) Arjun M. R. | (Malaysia) Chang Yee Jun (Malaysia) Tee Kai Wun | 19–21, 16–21 | (silver) Runner-up |
| 2022 (I) | India International Challenge | (India) Arjun M. R. | (Thailand) Chaloempon Charoenkitamorn (Thailand) Nanthakarn Yordphaisong | 21–17, 20–22, 21–18 | (gold) Winner |
| 2024 | Uganda International | (India) Arjun M. R. | (United States) Vinson Chiu (United States) Joshua Yuan | 21–14, 21–13 | (gold) Winner |
| 2024 | Polish Open | (India) Arjun M. R. | (Denmark) William Kryger Boe (Denmark) Christian Faust Kjær | 15–21, 23–21, 21–19 | (gold) Winner |

BWF International Challenge tournament
BWF International Series tournament
BWF Future Series tournament

=== BWF Junior International (3 runners-up) ===
Boys' doubles
| Year | Tournament | Partner | Opponent | Score | Result |
|---|---|---|---|---|---|
| 2016 | India Junior International | (India) Krishna Prasad Garaga | (Japan) Hiroki Okamura (Japan) Masayuki Onodera | 5–11, 14–12, 9–11, 11–13 | (silver) Runner-up |
| 2017 | Dutch Junior International | (India) Krishna Prasad Garaga | (Chinese Taipei) Su Li-wei (Chinese Taipei) Ye Hong-wei | 13–21, 19–21 | (silver) Runner-up |
| 2018 | Dutch Junior International | (India) Krishna Prasad Garaga | (China) Liang Weikeng (China) Shang Yichen | 20–22, 16–21 | (silver) Runner-up |

BWF Junior International Grand Prix tournament
BWF Junior International Challenge tournament
BWF Junior International Series tournament
BWF Junior Future Series tournament

== Performance timeline ==
Key

| W | Won | F | Finalist | SF | Semi-finalist |
| QF | Quarter-finalist | #R | Rounds 4, 3, 2, 1 | RR | Round-robin stage |
| Q# | Qualification round | A | Absent | w/d | Withdrew |
| G | Gold | S | Silver | B | Bronze |
| NH | Not held | N/A | Not applicable | DNQ | Did not qualify |

=== National team ===
- Senior level

| Team events | 2022 |
|---|---|
| Thomas Cup | G |

| Team events | 2026 |
|---|---|
| Thomas Cup | B |
