= Mithun Manjunath =

Indian badminton player (born 1998)

Personal information
- Born: 28 June 1998 (age 28) Karnataka, India

Sport
- Country: India
- Sport: Badminton
- Handedness: Right

Men's Singles
- Highest ranking: 33 (3 January 2023)
- Current ranking: 73 (3 November 2026)
- BWF profile
Medal record
Men's badminton
Representing India
Asian Games
Silver medal – second place	2022 Hangzhou	Men's team

Mithun Manjunath (born 28 June 1998) is an Indian badminton player. He became the Indian National Badminton Champion in men's singles in 2023.

== Achievements ==
=== BWF World Tour (2 runners-up) ===
The BWF World Tour, which was announced on 19 March 2017 and implemented in 2018, is a series of elite badminton tournaments sanctioned by the Badminton World Federation (BWF). The BWF World Tour is divided into levels of World Tour Finals, Super 1000, Super 750, Super 500, Super 300, and the BWF Tour Super 100.

Men's singles
Year	Tournament	Level	Opponent	Score	Result
2022	Orléans Masters	Super 100	(France) Toma Junior Popov	11–21, 19–21	(silver) Runner-up
2025	Guwahati Masters	Super 100	(India) Sanskar Saraswat	11–21, 21–17, 13–21	(silver) Runner-up

=== BWF International Challenge/Series (2 titles, 3 runners-up) ===
Men's singles
Year	Tournament	Opponent	Score	Result
2022 (I)	India International	(India) Meiraba Maisnam	14–21, 16–21	(silver) Runner-up
2022 (III)	India International	(India) Sourabh Verma	18–21, 21–17, 16–21	(silver) Runner-up
2022	Bangladesh International	(India) Priyanshu Rajawat	21–12, 16–21, 21–9	(gold) Winner
2024 (II)	India International	(India) B. M. Rahul Bharadwaj	5–13 retired	(gold) Winner
2025 (II)	India International	(India) Ginpaul Sonna	9–21, 11–21	(silver) Runner-up

BWF International Challenge tournament
BWF International Series tournament
BWF Future Series tournament
