= 2024 Odisha Masters =

Badminton tournament in Cuttack, India

Tournament details
- Dates: 10 December – 15 December
- Edition: 3rd
- Level: Super 100
- Total prize money: US$100,000
- Venue: Jawaharlal Nehru Indoor Stadium
- Location: Cuttack, Odisha, India

Champions
- Men's singles: (India) Rithvik Sanjeevi
- Women's singles: (China) Cai Yanyan
- Men's doubles: (China) Huang Di (China) Liu Yang
- Women's doubles: (Japan) Nanako Hara (Japan) Riko Kiyose
- Mixed doubles: (China) Gao Jiaxuan (China) Tang Ruizhi

The 2024 Odisha Masters (officially known as Yonex-Sunrise Odisha Masters 2024 for sponsorship reasons) was a badminton tournament which took place at the Jawaharlal Nehru Indoor Stadium, Cuttack, Odisha, India from 10 to 15 December 2024. It had a total prize pool of US$100,000.

== Tournament ==
The 2024 Odisha Masters was the thirty-ninth tournament of the 2024 BWF World Tour and the third edition of Odisha Masters. The tournament was organized by the Badminton Association of India with sanction from the BWF.

=== Venue ===
The tournament was held at the Jawaharlal Nehru Indoor Stadium in Cuttack, Odisha, India.

=== Point distribution ===
Below is the point distribution table for each phase of the tournament based on the BWF points system for the BWF Tour Super 100 event.

Winner	Runner-up	3/4	5/8	9/16	17/32	33/64	65/128	129/256
5,500	4,680	3,850	3,030	2,110	1,290	510	240	100

=== Prize pool ===
The total prize money was US$100,000 with the distribution of the prize money in accordance with BWF regulations.

Event	Winner	Finalist	Semi-finals	Quarter-finals	Last 16
Singles	$7,500	$3,800	$1,450	$600	$350
Doubles	$7,900	$3,800	$1,400	$725	$375

== Men's singles ==
=== Seeds ===
1. (Singapore) Jason Teh (third round)
2. (India) Priyanshu Rajawat (withdrew)
3. (India) Kiran George (second round)
4. (India) Ayush Shetty (quarter-finals)
5. (China) Wang Zhengxing (second round)
6. (India) Sathish Karunakaran (semi-finals)
7. (Denmark) Mads Christophersen (third round)
8. (Thailand) Panitchaphon Teeraratsakul (semi-finals)

=== Finals ===
Semi-finals
(India) Rithvik Sanjeevi	21	21
8	(Thailand) Panitchaphon Teeraratsakul	17	14
(India) Tharun Mannepalli	12	21	21
6	(India) Sathish Karunakaran	21	19	12

Final
(India) Rithvik Sanjeevi	21	21
(India) Tharun Mannepalli	18	16

=== Top half ===
==== Section 1 ====
First round
Q2	(China) Wang ZJ	16	20
Q4	(India) A Thakur	21	22
(Malaysia) M Atef H T	19	21	17
(Sri Lanka) R Hendahewa	21	18	21
(India) A Bhivpathaki	20	18
Q3	(India) P Shettigar	22	21
(India) R Sanjeevi	21	19	21
PFQ	(India) L Sharma	14	21	9

Second round
1	(Singapore) J Teh	21	21
Q4	(India) A Thakur	15	9
(China) Hu ZA	21	21
(Sri Lanka) R Hendahewa	10	8
5	(China) Wang ZX	21	16	9
Q3	(India) P Shettigar	19	21	21
(India) M Manjunath	19	16
(India) R Sanjeevi	21	21

Third round
1	(Singapore) J Teh	10	15
(China) Hu ZA	21	21
Q3	(India) P Shettigar	18	15
(India) R Sanjeevi	21	21

Quarter-finals
(China) Hu ZA	21	19	13
(India) R Sanjeevi	4	21	21

==== Section 2 ====
First round
Q6	(China) Liu YX	21	21
(Canada) S Thavanani	9	14
(India) Ma Singh	21	12	26
(Vietnam) Nguyễn H Đ	19	21	24
(India) S Dayanand	15	14
(India) B Somasundara	21	21
PFQ	(India) T Katam	21	21
(India) C Sen	9	10

Second round
3	(India) K George	19	6
Q6	(China) Liu YX	21	21
(India) P Katta	13	9
(India) Ma Singh	21	21
8	(Thailand) P Teeraratsakul	21	21
(India) B Somasundara	15	7
(Sri Lanka) D Abeywickrama	20	12
PFQ	(India) T Katam	22	21

Third round
Q6	(China) Liu YX	21	21
(India) Ma Singh	11	16
8	(Thailand) P Teeraratsakul	7	21	21
PFQ	(India) T Katam	21	12	14

Quarter-finals
Q6	(China) Liu YX	6	14
8	(Thailand) P Teeraratsakul	21	21

=== Bottom half ===
==== Section 3 ====
First round
Q7	(India) A Kanapala	4^{r}
Q5	(India) G Krishna	8
(Croatia) A Dinata	16	19
PFQ	(India) T Suveer	21	21
(India) T Mannepalli	21	21
(India) O Chaliha	5	18
(Saudi Arabia) M Shaikh	15	14
(India) S Dalal	21	21

Second round
Q5	(India) G Krishna	15	21	11
(India) A Saini	21	17	21
PFQ	(India) T Suveer	14	16
SWM	(Finland) J Oldorff	21	21
(India) T Mannepalli	21	21
Q8	(India) M Choudhary	7	9
(India) S Dalal	21	14	16
7	(Denmark) M Christophersen	16	21	21

Third round
(India) A Saini	21	21
SWM	(Finland) J Oldorff	15	11
(India) T Mannepalli	21	21
7	(Denmark) M Christophersen	19	14

Quarter-finals
(India) A Saini	11	6
(India) T Mannepalli	21	21

==== Section 4 ====
First round
(India) A Gupta	21	19
(India) R Mariswamy	23	21
(India) D Pujari	21	19	21
(India) M Maisnam	16	21	17
(India) A Mishra	21	15	22
Q1	(China) Zhu XC	16	21	24
PFQ	(India) V Kapur	21	19	13
(India) B Raghav	16	21	21

Second round
(India) R Mariswamy	16	21	21
(India) A Yeligar	21	10	14
(India) D Pujari	13	6
6	(India) S Karunakaran	21	21
Q1	(China) Zhu XC	21	21
(India) S Subramanian	15	16
(India) B Raghav	9	12
4	(India) A Shetty	21	21

Third round
(India) R Mariswamy	8	18
6	(India) S Karunakaran	21	21
Q1	(China) Zhu XC	16	16
4	(India) A Shetty	21	21

Quarter-finals
6	(India) S Karunakaran	21	12	21
4	(India) A Shetty	18	21	9

== Women's singles ==
=== Seeds ===
1. (Japan) Kaoru Sugiyama (second round)
2. (India) Anupama Upadhyaya (first round)
3. (Hong Kong) Lo Sin Yan (quarter-finals)
4. (India) Rakshitha Ramraj (quarter-finals)
5. (India) Tasnim Mir (second round)
6. (India) Isharani Baruah (withdrew)
7. (China) Wu Luoyu (first round)
8. (China) Dai Wang (second round)

=== Finals ===
Semi-finals
Q3	(China) Cai Yanyan	21	21
(Japan) Sorano Yoshikawa	17	19
(India) Shriyanshi Valishetty	19	19
(India) Tanvi Sharma	21	21

Final
Q3	(China) Cai Yanyan	21	21
(India) Tanvi Sharma	14	16

=== Top half ===
==== Section 1 ====
First round
1	(Japan) K Sugiyama	21	21
(India) S U R Chukka	6	10
(Thailand) P Opatniputh	17	24	16
(China) Han QX	21	22	21
5	(India) T Mir	21	21
(Italy) G Stiglich	11	5
Q3	(China) Cai YY	21	21
(India) P Barve	15	7

Second round
1	(Japan) K Sugiyama	21	20	9
(China) Han QX	13	22	21
5	(India) T Mir	11	16
Q3	(China) Cai YY	21	21

Quarter-finals
(China) Han QX	17	21	11
Q3	(China) Cai YY	21	16	21

==== Section 2 ====
First round
4	(India) R Ramraj	21	21
(India) K Mopati	10	11
(India) S Lele	21	21
(Uganda) F Mohamed Rafi	8	7
7	(China) Wu LY	21	14	20
(Japan) S Yoshikawa	17	21	22
(India) T Shah	23	21
(Thailand) Y Ketklieng	21	13

Second round
4	(India) R Ramraj	21	21
(India) S Lele	16	16
(Japan) S Yoshikawa	21	21
(India) T Shah	8	17

Quarter-finals
4	(India) R Ramraj	21	15	22
(Japan) S Yoshikawa	15	21	24

=== Bottom half ===
==== Section 3 ====
First round
(India) S Valishetty	22	21
Q1	(India) F Engineer	20	16
Q2	(China) Jia ZF	8	16
8	(China) Dai W	21	21
(Vietnam) Vũ T A T	16	21	11
(India) I Sharma	21	9	21
(India) A Rawat	11	8
3	(Hong Kong) Lo S Y	21	21

Second round
(India) S Valishetty	21	8	21
8	(China) Dai W	15	21	19
(India) I Sharma	16	17
3	(Hong Kong) Lo S Y	21	21

Quarter-finals
(India) S Valishetty	13	21	21
3	(Hong Kong) Lo S Y	21	10	14

==== Section 4 ====
First round
(United States) I Jaiswal	21	21
(India) K Selvam	9	13
Q4	(India) T Mamilla Palli	11	19
SWM	(India) A Kharb	21	21
(Hong Kong) S S Mehta	21	21
(United Arab Emirates) S S Parol	11	9
(India) T Sharma	21	17	21
2	(India) A Upadhyaya	18	21	19

Second round
(United States) I Jaiswal	21	13	13
SWM	(India) A Kharb	15	21	21
(Hong Kong) S S Mehta	21	15	17
(India) T Sharma	15	21	21

Quarter-finals
SWM	(India) A Kharb	23	16
(India) T Sharma	25	21

== Men's doubles ==
=== Seeds ===
1. (Denmark) William Kryger Boe / Christian Faust Kjær (quarter-finals)
2. (India) Hariharan Amsakarunan / Ruban Kumar (first round)
3. (England) Rory Easton / Alex Green (second round)
4. (China) Cui Hechen / Peng Jianqin (quarter-finals)
5. (China) Sun Wenjun / Zhu Yijun (semi-finals)
6. (France) Julien Maio / William Villeger (first round)
7. (China) Huang Di / Liu Yang (champions)
8. (India) Ishaan Bhatnagar / Sankar Prasad (second round)

=== Finals ===
Semi-finals
7	(China) Huang Di (China) Liu Yang	21	21	22
5	(China) Sun Wenjun (China) Zhu Yijun	8	23	20
(India) Pruthvi Roy (India) K. Sai Pratheek	21	19	20
(Japan) Kakeru Kumagai (Japan) Hiroki Nishi	16	21	22

Final
7	(China) Huang Di (China) Liu Yang	21	19	27
(Japan) Kakeru Kumagai (Japan) Hiroki Nishi	13	21	25

=== Top half ===
==== Section 1 ====
First round
1	(Denmark) W K Boe (Denmark) C F Kjær	21	21
(India) V Sreekumar (India) S Subramanian	5	12
(Malaysia) Chia W J (Malaysia) Lwi S H	19	23
(Japan) M Onodera (Japan) D Tanioka	21	25
7	(China) Huang D (China) Liu Y	21	21
(Singapore) W Koh (Singapore) J Kubo	11	16
Q2	(India) B R Arigela (India) V T Gobburu	21	21
(India) Nithin H V (India) V H V R Veeramreddy	14	15

Second round
1	(Denmark) W K Boe (Denmark) C F Kjær	21	21
(Japan) M Onodera (Japan) D Tanioka	17	17
7	(China) Huang D (China) Liu Y	21	23
Q2	(India) B R Arigela (India) V T Gobburu	10	21

Quarter-finals
1	(Denmark) W K Boe (Denmark) C F Kjær	17	14
7	(China) Huang D (China) Liu Y	21	21

==== Section 2 ====
First round
4	(China) Cui HC (China) Peng JQ	21	21
(India) A Makhija (India) S Tamboli	12	10
(Bahrain) M Muanis (United Arab Emirates) M Munawar	17	11
Q1	(India) A Thakore (India) D Thakore	21	21
5	(China) Sun WJ (China) Zhu YJ	21	21
Q3	(India) S Goala (India) D Rawat	18	14
(India) S Chhetri (India) A V Suresh	21	21
(India) A Choudhary (India) B Yadav	13	15

Second round
4	(China) Cui HC (China) Peng JQ	21	21
Q1	(India) A Thakore (India) D Thakore	12	15
5	(China) Sun WJ (China) Zhu YJ	22	22
(India) S Chhetri (India) A V Suresh	20	20

Quarter-finals
4	(China) Cui HC (China) Peng JQ	22	7	19
5	(China) Sun WJ (China) Zhu YJ	20	21	21

=== Bottom half ===
==== Section 3 ====
First round
(India) Vip Kuvale (India) Vir Kuvale	15	12
(India) P Roy (India) K S Pratheek	21	21
(Malaysia) Boon X Y (Malaysia) J Wong	21	10	23
6	(France) J Maio (France) W Villeger	19	21	21
(India) A Patharkar (India) G Vittalji	18	15
(India) D S Konthoujam (India) A Mohammad	21	21
Q4	(India) N Ranjan (India) A Surya	21	17
3	(England) R Easton (England) A Green	23	21

Second round
(India) P Roy (India) K S Pratheek	23	21
(Malaysia) Boon X Y (Malaysia) J Wong	21	16
(India) D S Konthoujam (India) A Mohammad	10	22	21
3	(England) R Easton (England) A Green	21	20	15

Quarter-finals
(India) P Roy (India) K S Pratheek	21	21
(India) D S Konthoujam (India) A Mohammad	11	16

==== Section 4 ====
First round
(India) C Joshi (India) M Rana	13	17
(Malaysia) Lau Y S (Malaysia) Lee Y B	21	21
PFQ	(India) S Gajendran (India) S Sharma	9	10
8	(India) I Bhatnagar (India) S Prasad	21	21
(India) A Mohanty (India) A Pattanayak	17	12
(Japan) K Kumagai (Japan) H Nishi	21	21
(China) Chen XJ (China) Guo RH	18	21	21
2	(India) H Amsakarunan (India) R Kumar	21	18	13

Second round
(Malaysia) Lau Y S (Malaysia) Lee Y B	21	22
8	(India) I Bhatnagar (India) S Prasad	19	20
(Japan) K Kumagai (Japan) H Nishi	21	21
(China) Chen XJ (China) Guo RH	14	12

Quarter-finals
(Malaysia) Lau Y S (Malaysia) Lee Y B	15	18
(Japan) K Kumagai (Japan) H Nishi	21	21

== Women's doubles ==
=== Seeds ===
1. (India) Rutaparna Panda / Swetaparna Panda (second round)
2. (India) Priya Konjengbam / Shruti Mishra (quarter-finals)
3. (Japan) Miki Kanehiro / Rui Kiyama (first round)
4. (India) Ashwini Bhat / Shikha Gautam (semi-finals)
5. (China) Huang Kexin / Tang Ruizhi (second round)
6. (India) Gayatri Rawat / Mansa Rawat (semi-finals)
7. (India) Kavipriya Selvam / Simran Singhi (quarter-finals)
8. (India) Apoorva Gahlawat / Sakshi Gahlawat (first round)

=== Finals ===
Semi-finals
6	(India) Gayatri Rawat (India) Mansa Rawat	17	14
(Japan) Nanako Hara (Japan) Riko Kiyose	21	21
4	(India) Ashwini Bhat (India) Shikha Gautam	7	24	17
(China) Keng Shuliang (China) Wang Tingge	21	22	21

Final
(Japan) Nanako Hara (Japan) Riko Kiyose	21	21
(China) Keng Shuliang (China) Wang Tingge	11	19

=== Top half ===
==== Section 1 ====
First round
1	(India) R Panda (India) S Panda	21	21
(India) A Balachandra (India) M Khan	14	14
Q4	(India) K Kanwal (India) B Pal	11	21	21
(India) P Parida (India) V Toppo	21	6	16
6	(India) G Rawat (India) M Rawat	21	21
(United Arab Emirates) N Desai (United Arab Emirates) S S Parol	6	8
(India) P Alvekar (India) M Deshpande	21	24
(India) A A Pai (India) N Ravishankar	19	22

Second round
1	(India) R Panda (India) S Panda	14	21	15
(India) K Kanwal (India) B Pal	21	11	21
6	(India) G Rawat (India) M Rawat	21	21
(India) P Alvekar (India) M Deshpande	17	13

Quarter-finals
(India) K Kanwal (India) B Pal	16	21	11
6	(India) G Rawat (India) M Rawat	21	15	21

==== Section 2 ====
First round
3	(Japan) M Kanehiro (Japan) R Kiyama	21	15	12
(China) Li HZ (China) Wang ZM	15	21	21
(India) T Hegde (India) R Thaker	21	21
(India) K Karishma (India) S Kumari	12	10
5	(China) Huang KX (China) Tang RZ	21	21
Q1	(India) S Balaji (India) D Sathish	10	8
(Japan) N Hara (Japan) R Kiyose	21	21
(India) P Natarajan (India) R Ramasamy	10	8

Second round
(China) Li HZ (China) Wang ZM	21	21
(India) T Hegde (India) R Thaker	4	7
5	(China) Huang KX (China) Tang RZ	16	13
(Japan) N Hara (Japan) R Kiyose	21	21

Quarter-finals
(China) Li HZ (China) Wang ZM	18	14
(Japan) N Hara (Japan) R Kiyose	21	21

=== Bottom half ===
==== Section 3 ====
First round
Q2	(India) K Kalakoti (India) K Kandpal	11	18
Q3	(India) S Avula (India) M Gollapalli	21	21
(India) R Ganesh (India) S Sikkandar	19	12
7	(India) K Selvam (India) S Singhi	21	21
(India) A Pramuthesh (India) S Singh	21	21
(India) K Gupta (India) L Srivastava	16	17
(India) N Ghosh (India) A Kandula	9	7
4	(India) A Bhat (India) S Gautam	21	21

Second round
Q3	(India) S Avula (India) M Gollapalli	10	12
7	(India) K Selvam (India) S Singhi	21	21
(India) A Pramuthesh (India) S Singh	13	13
4	(India) A Bhat (India) S Gautam	21	21

Quarter-finals
7	(India) K Selvam (India) S Singhi	19	19
4	(India) A Bhat (India) S Gautam	21	21

==== Section 4 ====
First round
(India) A Balan (India) T R G Krishna	10	10
(China) Keng SL (China) Wang TG	21	21
(China) Bao LJ (China) Li Q	21	21
8	(India) A Gahlawat (India) S Gahlawat	6	11
PFQ	(India) Yashica (India) S Christian	15	12
(India) A Khan (India) S S S Lakkamraju	21	21
(India) D Nandakumar (India) A B Radhakrishnan	21	18	22
2	(India) P Konjengbam (India) S Mishra	17	21	24

Second round
(China) Keng SL (China) Wang TG	21	21
(China) Bao LJ (China) Li Q	16	12
(India) A Khan (India) S S S Lakkamraju	11	12
2	(India) P Konjengbam (India) S Mishra	21	21

Quarter-finals
(China) Keng SL (China) Wang TG	21	21
2	(India) P Konjengbam (India) S Mishra	17	14

== Mixed doubles ==
=== Seeds ===
1. (India) Sathish Karunakaran / Aadya Variyath (quarter-finals)
2. (India) Rohan Kapoor / Ruthvika Gadde (semi-finals)
3. (India) Dhruv Kapila / Tanisha Crasto (withdrew)
4. (India) Ashith Surya / Amrutha Pramuthesh (first round)
5. (China) Zhu Yijun / Huang Kexin (quarter-finals)
6. (Singapore) Terry Hee / Jin Yujia (final)
7. (France) Julien Maio / Léa Palermo (semi-finals)
8. (England) Rory Easton / Lizzie Tolman (second round)

=== Finals ===
Semi-finals
(China) Gao Jiaxuan (China) Tang Ruizhi	21	21
7	(France) Julien Maio (France) Léa Palermo	19	18
6	(Singapore) Terry Hee (Singapore) Jin Yujia	21	18	21
2	(India) Rohan Kapoor (India) Ruthvika Gadde	14	21	19

Final
(China) Gao Jiaxuan (China) Tang Ruizhi	15	21	21
6	(Singapore) Terry Hee (Singapore) Jin Yujia	21	15	15

=== Top half ===
==== Section 1 ====
First round
1	(India) S Karunakaran (India) A Variyath	21	16	21
Q2	(India) Am Mohammad (India) S Singhi	15	21	15
Q3	(India) R Mohankumar (India) R Ramasamy	25	21
(India) A Dash (India) P P Panda	23	11
8	(England) R Easton (England) L Tolman	15	21	21
(India) S Sharma (India) P S Ram	21	18	15
(China) Gao JX (China) Tang RZ	21	21
Q1	(India) A Patharkar (India) K Kanwal	15	15

Second round
1	(India) S Karunakaran (India) A Variyath	21	21
Q3	(India) R Mohankumar (India) R Ramasamy	12	7
8	(England) R Easton (England) L Tolman	21	15	19
(China) Gao JX (China) Tang RZ	15	21	21

Quarter-finals
1	(India) S Karunakaran (India) A Variyath	19	21	16
(China) Gao JX (China) Tang RZ	21	16	21

==== Section 2 ====
First round
7	(France) J Maio (France) L Palermo	21	21
(India) Nithin H V (India) A A Pai	13	17
(India) A Agarwal (India) S Mishra	21	21
(India) M Jaglan (India) L Jaglan	13	7
SWM	(China) Zhang HY (China) Bao LJ	21	21
(India) Z Seyie (India) A Khan	6	5
(India) G Vittalji (India) B Pal	21	21
(India) D S Konthoujam (India) M Kshetrimayum	15	17

Second round
7	(France) J Maio (France) L Palermo	16	21	21
(India) A Agarwal (India) S Mishra	21	15	16
SWM	(China) Zhang HY (China) Bao LJ	21	21
(India) G Vittalji (India) B Pal	16	18

Quarter-finals
7	(France) J Maio (France) L Palermo	18	21	22
SWM	(China) Zhang HY (China) Bao LJ	21	18	20

=== Bottom half ===
==== Section 3 ====
First round
(India) T Kona (India) S K P Kudaravalli	6	20
(India) H Kothari (India) A Balachandra	21	22
(India) A Suresh (India) D Nandakumar	15	10
6	(Singapore) T Hee (Singapore) Jin YJ	21	21
Q4	(India) B Chhabra (India) M Bora	18	21	19
(India) S R Kanapuram (India) V Khadkekar	21	18	21
(India) N Kumar (India) R K Toor	21	21
4	(India) A Surya (India) A Pramuthesh	11	11

Second round
(India) H Kothari (India) A Balachandra	13	14
6	(Singapore) T Hee (Singapore) Jin YJ	21	21
(India) S R Kanapuram (India) V Khadkekar	21	22
(India) N Kumar (India) R K Toor	19	20

Quarter-finals
6	(Singapore) T Hee (Singapore) Jin YJ	26	21
(India) S R Kanapuram (India) V Khadkekar	24	7

==== Section 4 ====
First round
(India) V Sreekumar (India) A Balan	21	21
(India) Bharathsanjai S (India) S Sikkandar	14	18
(India) D Rawat (India) R Sharma	16	14
5	(China) Zhu YJ (China) Huang KX	21	21
(India) V G Prasad (India) J Dewangan	18	15
(India) B Navaneeth (India) R Thaker	21	21
(India) Subramanian S (India) G Krishna	14	16
2	(India) R Kapoor (India) R Gadde	21	21

Second round
(India) V Sreekumar (India) A Balan	6	16
5	(China) Zhu YJ (China) Huang KX	21	21
(India) B Navaneeth (India) R Thaker	14	11
2	(India) R Kapoor (India) R Gadde	21	21

Quarter-finals
5	(China) Zhu YJ (China) Huang KX	18	17
2	(India) R Kapoor (India) R Gadde	21	21

Preceded by 2024 Guwahati Masters	BWF World Tour; 2024 BWF season	Succeeded by 2025 Malaysia Open
