= 2024 Syed Modi International =

Badminton tournament in India

Tournament details
- Dates: 26 November – 1 December
- Edition: 13th
- Level: Super 300
- Total prize money: US$210,000
- Venue: Babu Banarasi Das Indoor Stadium
- Location: Lucknow, India

Champions
- Men's singles: (India) Lakshya Sen
- Women's singles: (India) P. V. Sindhu
- Men's doubles: (China) Huang Di (China) Liu Yang
- Women's doubles: (India) Treesa Jolly (India) Gayatri Gopichand
- Mixed doubles: (Thailand) Dechapol Puavaranukroh (Thailand) Supissara Paewsampran

The 2024 Syed Modi International was a badminton tournament that took place at Babu Banarasi Das Indoor Stadium in Lucknow, India, from 26 November to 1 December 2024. It had a total prize of $210,000.

== Tournament ==
The 2024 Syed Modi International was the thirty-seventh tournament of the 2024 BWF World Tour and the 2024 edition of the Syed Modi International championships, which have been held since 2009. This tournament was organized by the Badminton Association of India with sanction from the BWF.

=== Venue ===
This tournament was held at Babu Banarasi Das Indoor Stadium in Lucknow, India.

=== Point distribution ===
Below is the point distribution table for each phase of the tournament based on the BWF points system for the BWF World Tour Super 300 event.

Winner	Runner-up	3/4	5/8	9/16	17/32	33/64	65/128
7,000	5,950	4,900	3,850	2,750	1,670	660	320

=== Prize pool ===
The total prize money was US$210,000 with the distribution of the prize money in accordance with BWF regulations.

Event	Winner	Finalist	Semi-finals	Quarter-finals	Last 16
Singles	$15,750	$7,980	$3,045	$1,260	$735
Doubles	$16,590	$7,980	$2,940	$1,522.5	$787.5

== Men's singles ==
=== Seeds ===
1. (India) Lakshya Sen (champion)
2. (India) Priyanshu Rajawat (semi-finals)
3. (India) Kiran George (second round)
4. (Singapore) Jason Teh (final)
5. (Thailand) Kantaphon Wangcharoen (first round)
6. (Republic of Ireland) Nhat Nguyen (second round)
7. (India) Sathish Karunakaran (first round)
8. (India) Ayush Shetty (quarter-finals)

=== Finals ===
Semi-finals
1	(India) Lakshya Sen	21	21
(Japan) Shogo Ogawa	8	14
4	(Singapore) Jason Teh	21	21
2	(India) Priyanshu Rajawat	13	19

Final
1	(India) Lakshya Sen	21	21
4	(Singapore) Jason Teh	6	7

=== Top half ===
==== Section 1 ====
First round
1	(India) L Sen	21	21
Q1	(Malaysia) Aidil S	12	12
(India) Ravi	21	9	10
(Israel) D Dubovenko	18	21	21
6	(Republic of Ireland) N Nguyen	21	21
(India) C Sen	14	15
PFQ	(Thailand) S Jamsri	21	19	10
(India) M Maisnam	14	21	21

Second round
1	(India) L Sen	21	21
(Israel) D Dubovenko	14	13
6	(Republic of Ireland) N Nguyen	15	13
(India) M Maisnam	21	21

Quarter-finals
1	(India) L Sen	21	21
(India) M Maisnam	8	19

==== Section 2 ====
First round
3	(India) K George	21	23
(India) A Mishra	12	21
(Japan) S Ogawa	21	19	21
(India) T Mannepalli	14	21	14
8	(India) A Shetty	21	15	21
(India) R Mariswamy	18	21	16
(India) M Manjunath	18	21	17
(Malaysia) J Hoh	21	17	21

Second round
3	(India) K George	21	20	11
(Japan) S Ogawa	19	22	21
8	(India) A Shetty	21	21
(Malaysia) J Hoh	12	19

Quarter-finals
(Japan) S Ogawa	21	21
8	(India) A Shetty	7	14

=== Bottom half ===
==== Section 3 ====
First round
(China) Wang ZX	21	21	23
Q2	(India) S Dayanand	23	17	21
Q3	(India) R Sanjeevi	21	21
5	(Thailand) K Wangcharoen	17	16
(India) S Subramanian	19	21
(Malaysia) Cheam J W	21	23
(Azerbaijan) A R Dwicahyo	13	18
4	(Singapore) J Teh	21	21

Second round
(China) Wang ZX	21	3^{r}
Q3	(India) R Sanjeevi	23	7
(Malaysia) Cheam J W	17	11
4	(Singapore) J Teh	21	21

Quarter-finals
Q3	(India) R Sanjeevi	10	20
4	(Singapore) J Teh	21	22

==== Section 4 ====
First round
Q4	(India) S P Singh	14	18
(Sri Lanka) V Nettasinghe	21	21
(Vietnam) Nguyễn H Đ	21	20	21
7	(India) S K Karunakaran	14	22	15
(Finland) K Koljonen	19	21	18
(Vietnam) Lê Đ P	21	12	21
(India) K Kumar	13	12
2	(India) P Rajawat	21	21

Second round
(Sri Lanka) V Nettasinghe	19	14
(Vietnam) Nguyễn H Đ	21	21
(Vietnam) Lê Đ P	15	8
2	(India) P Rajawat	21	21

Quarter-finals
(Vietnam) Nguyễn H Đ	13	8
2	(India) P Rajawat	21	21

== Women's singles ==
=== Seeds ===
1. (India) P. V. Sindhu (champion)
2. (India) Malvika Bansod (second round)
3. (India) Aakarshi Kashyap (first round)
4. (Thailand) Pornpicha Choeikeewong (second round)
5. (India) Anupama Upadhyaya (second round)
6. (India) Rakshitha Ramraj (second round)
7. (Malaysia) Letshanaa Karupathevan (first round)
8. (Myanmar) Thet Htar Thuzar (second round)

=== Finals ===
Semi-finals
1	(India) P. V. Sindhu	21	21
(India) Unnati Hooda	12	9
(Thailand) Lalinrat Chaiwan	19	12
(China) Wu Luoyu	21	21

Final
1	(India) P. V. Sindhu	21	21
(China) Wu Luoyu	14	16

=== Top half ===
==== Section 1 ====
First round
1	(India) P. V. Sindhu	21	21
(India) A Kharb	17	15
(India) I Sharma	21	21
(India) D Singh	13	19
7	(Malaysia) Letshanaa K	16	19
(China) Dai W	21	21
(India) D Sihag	19	21	21
Q2	(India) N Kanderi	21	18	11

Second round
1	(India) P. V. Sindhu	21	12	21
(India) I Sharma	10	21	15
(China) Dai W	21	21
(India) D Sihag	14	15

Quarter-finals
1	(India) P. V. Sindhu	21	21
(China) Dai W	15	17

==== Section 2 ====
First round
4	(Thailand) P Choeikeewong	13	21	21
Q4	(India) M Singh	21	14	17
(India) U Hooda	21	21
(Thailand) T Nithiittikrai	12	16
8	(Myanmar) Thet Htar T	21	23
(Republic of Ireland) R Darragh	14	21
Q3	(India) T Sharma	23	8
(United States) I Jaiswal	25	21

Second round
4	(Thailand) P Choeikeewong	18	20
(India) U Hooda	21	22
8	(Myanmar) Thet Htar T	21	19	10
(United States) I Jaiswal	11	21	21

Quarter-finals
(India) U Hooda	21	21
(United States) I Jaiswal	16	9

=== Bottom half ===
==== Section 3 ====
First round
(Chinese Taipei) Hsieh Y-e	18	15
(India) T Mir	21	21
(Azerbaijan) K F Azzahra	21	20	15
5	(India) A Upadhyaya	19	22	21
Q1	(China) Han QX	21	21
(Chinese Taipei) Chen S-y	16	16
(Thailand) L Chaiwan	21	21
3	(India) A Kashyap	8	12

Second round
(India) T Mir	21	13	21
5	(India) A Upadhyaya	15	21	7
Q1	(China) Han QX
(Thailand) L Chaiwan	w	/	o

Quarter-finals
(India) T Mir	13	15
(Thailand) L Chaiwan	21	21

==== Section 4 ====
First round
(India) I Baruah	16	12
(China) Wu L Y	21	21
(India) K Mopati	10	21	13
6	(India) R Ramraj	21	16	21
(India) S Farooqui	11	3^{r}
(India) S Valishetty	21	8
(Poland) W Dąbczyńska	16	7
2	(India) M Bansod	21	21

Second round
(China) Wu L Y	21	10	21
6	(India) R Ramraj	18	21	16
(India) S Valishetty	21	21
2	(India) M Bansod	12	15

Quarter-finals
(China) Wu L Y	20	21	21
(India) S Valishetty	22	14	19

== Men's doubles ==
=== Seeds ===
1. (India) Satwiksairaj Rankireddy / Chirag Shetty (withdrew)
2. (India) Hariharan Amsakarunan / Ruban Kumar Rethinasabapathi (quarter-finals)
3. (Malaysia) Kang Khai Xing / Aaron Tai (quarter-finals)
4. (Malaysia) Bryan Goonting / Fazriq Razif (second round)
5. (China) Cui Hechen / Peng Jianqin (second round)
6. (Thailand) Chaloempon Charoenkitamorn / Worrapol Thongsa-nga (second round)
7. (Thailand) Kittinupong Kedren / Dechapol Puavaranukroh (quarter-finals)
8. (England) Rory Easton / Alex Green (second round)

=== Finals ===
Semi-finals
(India) Pruthvi Roy (India) K. Sai Pratheek	21	17	21
(India) Ishaan Bhatnagar (India) Sankar Prasad	17	21	16
(China) Huang Di (China) Liu Yang	21	21
(China) Sun Wenjun (China) Zhu Yijun	19	14

Final
(India) Pruthvi Roy (India) K. Sai Pratheek	14	21	17
(China) Huang Di (China) Liu Yang	21	19	21

=== Top half ===
==== Section 1 ====
First round
1	(India) S Rankireddy (India) C Shetty
Q2	(China) Chen XJ (China) Guo RH	w	/	o
(India) S Subramanian (India) A V Suresh	13	12
(India) P Roy (India) K S Pratheek	21	21
6	(Thailand) C Charoenkitamorn (Thailand) W Thongsa-nga	21	21
(Bahrain) M Muanis (United Arab Emirates) M Munawar	6	5
(Malaysia) Lim T J (Malaysia) Wong T C	21	21
(India) D Rambhiya (India) P Ranade	16	10

Second round
Q2	(China) Chen XJ (China) Guo RH	14	20
(India) P Roy (India) K S Pratheek	21	22
6	(Thailand) C Charoenkitamorn (Thailand) W Thongsa-nga	19	21	20
(Malaysia) Lim T J (Malaysia) Wong T C	21	11	22

Quarter-finals
(India) P Roy (India) K S Pratheek	12	21	21
(Malaysia) Lim T J (Malaysia) Wong T C	21	11	16

==== Section 2 ====
First round
3	(Malaysia) Kang K X (Malaysia) A Tai	21	15	21
(Malaysia) Lau Y S (Malaysia) Lee Y B	16	21	14
Q3	(India) Y Raikwar (India) H B Thandrangi	9	7
(Chinese Taipei) Lu C (Chinese Taipei) Po L-w	21	21
5	(China) Cui HC (China) Peng JQ	21	21
(India) Nithin H. V. (India) V H V R Veeramreddy	6	16
(Thailand) N Mangkornloi (Thailand) S Sae-ma	17	24	18
(India) I Bhatnagar (India) S Prasad	21	22	21

Second round
3	(Malaysia) Kang K X (Malaysia) A Tai	21	13	21
(Chinese Taipei) Lu C (Chinese Taipei) Po L-w	16	21	14
5	(China) Cui HC (China) Peng JQ
(India) I Bhatnagar (India) S Prasad	w	/	o

Quarter-finals
3	(Malaysia) Kang K X (Malaysia) A Tai	12	29
(India) I Bhatnagar (India) S Prasad	21	30

=== Bottom half ===
==== Section 3 ====
First round
(India) A Makhija (India) S Tamboli	23	16
(India) P Raj (India) G Shaik	25	21
Q1	(India) Vip Kuvale (India) Vir Kuvale	13	13
7	(Thailand) K Kedren (Thailand) D Puavaranukroh	21	21
(India) A R Doddavarapu (India) S Elango	7	13
(China) Huang D (China) Liu Y	21	21
PFQ	(India) V Sreekumar (India) A Surya	15	14
4	(Malaysia) B Goonting (Malaysia) F Razif	21	21

Second round
(India) P Raj (India) G Shaik	13	8
7	(Thailand) K Kedren (Thailand) D Puavaranukroh	21	21
(China) Huang D (China) Liu Y	21	21
4	(Malaysia) B Goonting (Malaysia) F Razif	19	13

Quarter-finals
7	(Thailand) K Kedren (Thailand) D Puavaranukroh	18	18
(China) Huang D (China) Liu Y	21	21

==== Section 4 ====
First round
(Japan) T Aizawa (Japan) D Sano	16	15
(China) Sun WJ (China) Zhu YJ	21	21
(India) S Sharma (India) M Singh	6	14
8	(England) R Easton (England) A Green	21	21
Q4	(Thailand) P Kaosamaang (Thailand) T Punpanich	21	21
(India) P. S Ravikrishna (India) A Shetty	14	14
(India) S S Dhanraj (India) S P Karri	10	8
2	(India) H Amsakarunan (India) R K Rethinasabapathi	21	21

Second round
(China) Sun WJ (China) Zhu YJ	19	21	21
8	(England) R Easton (England) A Green	21	10	15
Q4	(Thailand) P Kaosamaang (Thailand) T Punpanich	18	17
2	(India) H Amsakarunan (India) R K Rethinasabapathi	21	21

Quarter-finals
(China) Sun WJ (China) Zhu YJ	24	21
2	(India) H Amsakarunan (India) R K Rethinasabapathi	22	19

== Women's doubles ==
=== Seeds ===
1. (India) Tanisha Crasto / Ashwini Ponnappa (semi-finals)
2. (India) Treesa Jolly / Gayatri Gopichand (champions)
3. (Thailand) Benyapa Aimsaard / Nuntakarn Aimsaard (semi-finals)
4. (India) Rutaparna Panda / Swetaparna Panda (quarter-finals)
5. (India) Priya Konjengbam / Shruti Mishra (quarter-finals)
6. (Malaysia) Go Pei Kee / Teoh Mei Xing (quarter-finals)
7. (Hong Kong) Lui Lok Lok / Tsang Hiu Yan (second round)
8. (China) Huang Kexin / Yang Jiayi (first round)

=== Finals ===
Semi-finals
1	(India) Tanisha Crasto (India) Ashwini Ponnappa	21	16	13
(China) Bao Lijing (China) Li Qian	14	21	21
3	(Thailand) Benyapa Aimsaard (Thailand) Nuntakarn Aimsaard	21	18	10
2	(India) Treesa Jolly (India) Gayatri Gopichand	18	21	21

Final
(China) Bao Lijing (China) Li Qian	18	11
2	(India) Treesa Jolly (India) Gayatri Gopichand	21	21

=== Top half ===
==== Section 1 ====
First round
1	(India) T Crasto (India) A Ponnappa	21	21
(India) I Malik (India) T Malik	12	10
(India) S Singh (India) T Singh	12	11
(Chinese Taipei) Chen S-y (Chinese Taipei) Hsieh Y-e	21	21
5	(India) P Konjengbam (India) S Mishra	21	21
(India) V Khadkekar (India) A Khan	14	12
(India) K Selvam (India) S Singhi	21	21
PFQ	(India) A Balan (India) T R G Krishna	11	14

Second round
1	(India) T Crasto (India) A Ponnappa	21	8	21
(Chinese Taipei) Chen S-y (Chinese Taipei) Hsieh Y-e	19	21	12
5	(India) P Konjengbam (India) S Mishra	21	21
(India) K Selvam (India) S Singhi	15	12

Quarter-finals
1	(India) T Crasto (India) A Ponnappa	21	17	21
5	(India) P Konjengbam (India) S Mishra	12	21	16

==== Section 2 ====
First round
4	(India) R Panda (India) S Panda	21	21
(India) R Das (India) P Holkar	10	16
(India) P Alvekar (India) M Deshpande	18	13
(India) D Nandakumar (India) A B Radhakrishnan	21	21
7	(Hong Kong) Lui L L (Hong Kong) Tsang H Y	21	21
(India) T Hegde (India) R Thaker	19	13
(India) U Palit (India) H Rout	6	10
(China) Bao LJ (China) Li Q	21	21

Second round
4	(India) R Panda (India) S Panda	21	21
(India) D Nandakumar (India) A B Radhakrishnan	15	10
7	(Hong Kong) Lui L L (Hong Kong) Tsang H Y	14	21	14
(China) Bao LJ (China) Li Q	21	13	21

Quarter-finals
4	(India) R Panda (India) S Panda	9	4
(China) Bao LJ (China) Li Q	21	21

=== Bottom half ===
==== Section 3 ====
First round
(India) N Manglam (India) D R Balasubramanian	12	7
(Chinese Taipei) Cheng Y-p (Chinese Taipei) Sun Y-h	21	21
Q1	(China) Keng SL (China) Wang TG	21	21
8	(China) Huang KX (China) Yang JY	16	16
Q4	(China) Li HZ (China) Wang ZM	21	21
(India) R Ganesh (India) S Sikkandar	9	6
(India) U Hooda (India) R K Toor	17	7
3	(Thailand) B Aimsaard (Thailand) N Aimsaard	21	21

Second round
(Chinese Taipei) Cheng Y-p (Chinese Taipei) Sun Y-h	9	6
Q1	(China) Keng SL (China) Wang TG	21	21
Q4	(China) Li HZ (China) Wang ZM	14	8
3	(Thailand) B Aimsaard (Thailand) N Aimsaard	21	21

Quarter-finals
Q1	(China) Keng SL (China) Wang TG	12	16
3	(Thailand) B Aimsaard (Thailand) N Aimsaard	21	21

==== Section 4 ====
First round
(India) G Rawat (India) M Rawat	21	21
(India) A Gahlawat (India) S Gahlawat	17	15
Q3	(India) K Gupta (India) R Sharma	10	11
6	(Malaysia) Go P K (Malaysia) Teoh M X	21	21
Q2	(India) K Kanwal (India) B Pal	17	20
(India) K A Bhat (India) S Gautam	21	22
(India) A S Sunil (India) V Viswanath Sri
2	(India) T Jolly (India) G Gopichand	w	/	o

Second round
(India) G Rawat (India) M Rawat	7	14
6	(Malaysia) Go P K (Malaysia) Teoh M X	21	21
(India) K A Bhat (India) S Gautam	13	10
2	(India) T Jolly (India) G Gopichand	21	21

Quarter-finals
6	(Malaysia) Go P K (Malaysia) Teoh M X	8	15
2	(India) T Jolly (India) G Gopichand	21	21

== Mixed doubles ==
=== Seeds ===
1. (India) B. Sumeeth Reddy / N. Sikki Reddy (second round)
2. (India) Sathish Karunakaran / Aadya Variyath (quarter-finals)
3. (Malaysia) Wong Tien Ci / Lim Chiew Sien (quarter-finals)
4. (China) Zhou Zhihong / Yang Jiayi (semi-finals)
5. (India) Dhruv Kapila / Tanisha Crasto (final)
6. (Thailand) Dechapol Puavaranukroh / Supissara Paewsampran (champions)
7. (India) Rohan Kapoor / Gadde Ruthvika Shivani (second round)
8. (India) Ashith Surya / Amrutha Pramuthesh (first round)

=== Finals ===
Semi-finals
5	(India) Dhruv Kapila (India) Tanisha Crasto	21	21
4	(China) Zhou Zhihong (China) Yang Jiayi	16	15
Q2	(China) Liao Pinyi (China) Huang Kexin	11	13
6	(Thailand) Dechapol Puavaranukroh (Thailand) Supissara Paewsampran	21	21

Final
5	(India) Dhruv Kapila (India) Tanisha Crasto	21	14	8
6	(Thailand) Dechapol Puavaranukroh (Thailand) Supissara Paewsampran	18	21	21

=== Top half ===
==== Section 1 ====
First round
1	(India) B S Reddy (India) N S Reddy	21	21
(India) Subramanian S (India) T R G Krishna	10	18
(Malaysia) Loo B K (Malaysia) Ho L E	21	21
Q4	(India) B R Arigela (India) V Kalagotla	15	15
5	(India) D Kapila (India) T Crasto	12	21	21
(China) Zhang HY (China) Bao LJ	21	15	17
(India) M Jaglan (India) L Jaglan	19	21	21
(India) T Kona (India) S K P Kudaravalli	21	14	11

Second round
1	(India) B S Reddy (India) N S Reddy	21	16	13
(Malaysia) Loo B K (Malaysia) Ho L E	19	21	21
5	(India) D Kapila (India) T Crasto	21	21
(India) M Jaglan (India) L Jaglan	7	13

Quarter-finals
(Malaysia) Loo B K (Malaysia) Ho L E	16	13
5	(India) D Kapila (India) T Crasto	21	21

==== Section 2 ====
First round
4	(China) Zhou ZH (China) Yang JY	21	21
(India) S R Kanapuram (India) V Khadkekar	9	12
(India) S Goala (India) N Manglam	19	11
(India) V Sreekumar (India) A Balan	21	21
8	(India) A Surya (India) A Pramuthesh	15	21	21
(India) D Rambhiya (India) S Singhi	21	10	23
(England) R Easton (England) L Tolman	21	18	21
(Malaysia) Liew X (Malaysia) Go P K	11	21	14

Second round
4	(China) Zhou ZH (China) Yang JY	21	21
(India) V Sreekumar (India) A Balan	11	12
(India) D Rambhiya (India) S Singhi	18	12
(England) R Easton (England) L Tolman	21	21

Quarter-finals
4	(China) Zhou ZH (China) Yang JY	21	20	21
(England) R Easton (England) L Tolman	19	22	19

=== Bottom half ===
==== Section 3 ====
First round
Q2	(China) Liao PY (China) Huang KX	21	21
(India) A V Suresh (India) D Nandakumar	16	16
(India) Nithin H. V. (India) A A Pai	14	12
7	(India) R Kapoor (India) S Gadde	21	21
(India) G Shaik (India) K. Maneesha	21	12	21
(India) N Kumar (India) R K Toor	16	21	19
(India) V G Prasad (India) J Dewangan	12	10
3	(Malaysia) Wong T C (Malaysia) Lim C S	21	21

Second round
Q2	(China) Liao PY (China) Huang KX	21	21
7	(India) R Kapoor (India) S Gadde	18	19
(India) G Shaik (India) K. Maneesha	16	18
3	(Malaysia) Wong T C (Malaysia) Lim C S	21	21

Quarter-finals
Q2	(China) Liao PY (China) Huang KX	21	22	21
3	(Malaysia) Wong T C (Malaysia) Lim C S	14	24	16

==== Section 4 ====
First round
(India) A Agarwal (India) S Mishra	14	21	17
PFQ	(Thailand) P Horbanluekit (Thailand) F Korpthammakit	21	19	21
Q1	(India) H B Thandrangi (India) K Kanwal	15	9
6	(Thailand) D Puavaranukroh (Thailand) S Paewsampran	21	21
(India) B Navaneeth (India) R Thaker	19	20
(India) C Joshi (India) K Gupta	21	22
Q3	(India) G Vittalji (India) S S Singh	8	21	15
2	(India) S Karunakaran (India) A Variyath	21	19	21

Second round
PFQ	(Thailand) P Horbanluekit (Thailand) F Korpthammakit	6	9
6	(Thailand) D Puavaranukroh (Thailand) S Paewsampran	21	21
(India) C Joshi (India) K Gupta	18	17
2	(India) S Karunakaran (India) A Variyath	21	21

Quarter-finals
6	(Thailand) D Puavaranukroh (Thailand) S Paewsampran	21	21
2	(India) S Karunakaran (India) A Variyath	16	4

Preceded by 2024 China Masters	BWF World Tour; 2024 BWF season	Succeeded by 2024 Guwahati Masters
