= 2024 Guwahati Masters =

Badminton tournament in Guwahati, India

Tournament details
- Dates: 3 December – 8 December
- Edition: 2nd
- Level: Super 100
- Total prize money: US$100,000
- Venue: Sarju Sarai Indoor Sports Complex
- Location: Guwahati, Assam, India

Champions
- Men's singles: (India) Sathish Karunakaran
- Women's singles: (China) Cai Yanyan
- Men's doubles: (Malaysia) Chia Wei Jie (Malaysia) Lwi Sheng Hao
- Women's doubles: (India) Tanisha Crasto (India) Ashwini Ponnappa
- Mixed doubles: (China) Zhang Hanyu (China) Bao Lijing

The 2024 Guwahati Masters, known as Yonex-Sunrise Guwahati Masters 2024 for sponsorship reasons, was a badminton tournament that took place at the Sarju Sarai Indoor Sports Complex, Guwahati, Assam, India from 3 to 8 December 2024. It had a total prize pool of US$100,000.

== Tournament ==
The 2024 Guwahati Masters was the thirty-eighth tournament of the 2024 BWF World Tour and was the second edition Guwahati Masters championships. It was organized by the Badminton Association of India with sanction from the BWF.

=== Venue ===
The tournament was held at Sarju Sarai Indoor Sports Complex in Guwahati, Assam, India.

=== Point distribution ===
Below is the point distribution table for each phase of the tournament based on the BWF points system for the BWF Tour Super 100 event.

Winner	Runner-up	3/4	5/8	9/16	17/32	33/64	65/128	129/256
5,500	4,680	3,850	3,030	2,110	1,290	510	240	100

=== Prize pool ===
The total prize money was US$100,000 with the distribution of the prize money in accordance with BWF regulations.

Event	Winner	Finalist	Semi-finals	Quarter-finals	Last 16
Singles	$7,500	$3,800	$1,450	$600	$350
Doubles	$7,900	$3,800	$1,400	$725	$375

== Men's singles ==
=== Seeds ===
1. (India) Priyanshu Rajawat (third round)
2. (Singapore) Jason Teh (third round)
3. (India) Sathish Karunakaran (champion)
4. (India) Ayush Shetty (quarter-finals)
5. (Denmark) Mads Christophersen (third round)
6. (China) Wang Zhengxing (semi-finals)
7. (Malaysia) Cheam June Wei (semi-finals)
8. (Thailand) Panitchaphon Teeraratsakul (third round)

=== Finals ===
Semi-finals
6	(China) Wang Zhengxing	21	14	16
3	(India) Sathish Karunakaran	13	21	21
7	(Malaysia) Cheam June Wei	21	12	1^{r}
Q2	(China) Zhu Xuanchen	10	21	7

Final
3	(India) Sathish Karunakaran	21	21
Q2	(China) Zhu Xuanchen	17	14

=== Top half ===
==== Section 1 ====
First round
(India) A Bhivpathaki	21	21
PFQ	(India) T Suveer	15	19
(India) S Dayanand	21	13	21
(India) T Mannepalli	10	21	23
(India) P Katta	21	17	15
(India) B Raghav	13	21	21
Q4	(China) Liu YX	21	21
PFQ	(India) G Krishna	10	13

Second round
1	(India) P Rajawat	22	21
(India) A Bhivpathaki	20	14
PFQ	(India) A Thakur	21	11	7
(India) T Mannepalli	13	21	21
6	(China) Wang ZX	27	21
(India) B Raghav	25	10
(India) M Singh	22	18	21
Q4	(China) Liu YX	20	21	19

Third round
1	(India) P Rajawat	22	21	13
(India) T Mannepalli	24	15	21
6	(China) Wang ZX	21	21
(India) M Singh	10	15

Quarter-finals
(India) T Mannepalli	21	16	15
6	(China) Wang ZX	14	21	21

==== Section 2 ====
First round
Q7	(China) Wang ZJ	21	21
Q6	(India) S Saraswat	18	15
(Malaysia) S Aidil	28	13	21
Q1	(India) R Chouhan	26	21	18
(India) C Sen	15	18
(India) R Mariswamy	21	21
(Thailand) S Jamsri	21	21
Q5	(India) P Shettigar	17	19

Second round
3	(India) S Karunakaran	19	21	21
Q7	(China) Wang ZJ	21	16	17
(India) A Saini	11	17
(Malaysia) S Aidil	21	21
8	(Thailand) P Teeraratsakul	22	21
(India) R Mariswamy	20	19
(India) A John Mathew	12	12
(Thailand) S Jamsri	21	21

Third round
3	(India) S Karunakaran	21	9	21
(Malaysia) S Aidil	19	21	7
8	(Thailand) P Teeraratsakul	21	11	21
(Thailand) S Jamsri	15	21	23

Quarter-finals
3	(India) S Karunakaran	21	21
(Thailand) S Jamsri	19	13

=== Bottom half ===
==== Section 3 ====
First round
(India) L Sharma	15	21	17
(India) T Katam	21	19	21
(India) A Gupta	6	20
(Sri Lanka) R Hendahewa	21	22
(India) S Subramanian	20	21	21
(India) O Chaliha	22	14	18
(India) B M R Bharadwaj	21	19	11
(India) M Manjunath	16	21	21

Second round
(India) T Katam	16	15
(Azerbaijan) A R Dwicahyo	21	21
(Sri Lanka) R Hendahewa	21	13	14
7	(Malaysia) Cheam J W	17	21	21
(India) S Subramanian	21	21
PFQ	(India) A Singh	10	8
(India) M Manjunath	11	11
4	(India) A Shetty	21	21

Third round
(Azerbaijan) A R Dwicahyo	14	9
7	(Malaysia) Cheam J W	21	21
(India) S Subramanian	21	20	21
4	(India) A Shetty	19	22	23

Quarter-finals
7	(Malaysia) Cheam J W	21	16	22
4	(India) A Shetty	14	21	20

==== Section 4 ====
First round
(Malaysia) M Atef H T	22	21
(India) A Yeligar	20	16
(India) S P Singh	18	21	17
(India) A Mishra	21	16	21
Q2	(China) Zhu XC	21	21
PFQ	(India) V Kapur	17	7
(China) Hu ZA	21	21
PFQ	(India) N S Iyer	18	15

Second round
(Malaysia) M Atef H T	21	7	6
(India) R Ravi	10	21	21
(India) A Mishra	12	22	15
5	(Denmark) M Christophersen	21	20	21
Q2	(China) Zhu XC	21	21
Q8	(India) S Mishra	15	17
(China) Hu ZA	21	18	12
2	(Singapore) J Teh	16	21	21

Third round
(India) R Ravi	21	21	21
5	(Denmark) M Christophersen	23	17	14
Q2	(China) Zhu XC	17	21	17
2	(Singapore) J Teh	21	19	5^{r}

Quarter-finals
(India) R Ravi	18	8
Q2	(China) Zhu XC	21	21

== Women's singles ==
=== Seeds ===
1. (India) Malvika Bansod (withdrew)
2. (Japan) Kaoru Sugiyama (second round)
3. (India) Anupama Upadhyaya (withdrew)
4. (Hong Kong) Lo Sin Yan (second round)
5. (India) Rakshitha Ramraj (withdrew)
6. (Myanmar) Thet Htar Thuzar (first round)
7. (India) Tanya Hemanth (first round)
8. (India) Isharani Baruah (first round)

=== Finals ===
Semi-finals
Q4	(China) Cai Yanyan	21	21
(China) Wu Luoyu	16	18
(India) Anmol Kharb	21	21
(India) Mansi Singh	19	17

Final
Q4	(China) Cai Yanyan	14	21	21
(India) Anmol Kharb	21	13	19

=== Top half ===
==== Section 1 ====
First round
4	(Hong Kong) Lo S Y	22	21
PFQ	(India) P Barve	20	14
PFQ	(India) A Pravin	15	13
(China) Dai W	21	21
SWM	(Azerbaijan) K F Azzahra	10	12
Q4	(China) Cai YY	21	21
(China) Han QX	21	21
(India) D Singh	15	7

Second round
4	(Hong Kong) Lo S Y	19	15
(China) Dai W	21	21
Q4	(China) Cai YY	21	21
(China) Han QX	15	8

Quarter-finals
(China) Dai W	21	10	7
Q4	(China) Cai YY	17	21	21

==== Section 2 ====
First round
SWM	(India) T Hemanth	18	14
(India) T Sharma	21	21
Q2	(India) T Deshpande	10	13
(Chinese Taipei) Hsieh Y-e	21	21
SWM	(India) U Hooda	19	14
(India) S Valishetty	21	21
(United Arab Emirates) S S Parol	11	5
(China) Wu LY	21	21

Second round
(India) T Sharma	21	21
(Chinese Taipei) Hsieh Y-e	19	8
(India) S Valishetty	21	12	12
(China) Wu LY	19	21	21

Quarter-finals
(India) T Sharma	15	12
(China) Wu LY	21	21

=== Bottom half ===
==== Section 3 ====
First round
(Thailand) L Chaiwan	21	21
PFQ	(India) T Mamilla Palli	5	7
(India) I Sharma	13	21	22
SWM	(India) T Mir	21	19	24
Q1	(India) S R Kannareddy	11	19
(India) T Shah	21	21
(India) A Kharb	21	18	21
SWM	(India) I Baruah	10	21	18

Second round
(Thailand) L Chaiwan	21	18	26
SWM	(India) T Mir	11	21	24
(India) T Shah	9	15
(India) A Kharb	21	21

Quarter-finals
(Thailand) L Chaiwan	13	24	20
(India) A Kharb	21	22	22

==== Section 4 ====
First round
(India) M Singh	21	21
Q3	(India) A Rao	18	17
(Chinese Taipei) Chen S-y	21	21
6	(Myanmar) Thet Htar T	18	19
(India) A Rawat	9	11
PFQ	(Thailand) Y Ketklieng	21	21
(United States) I Jaiswal	8	6
2	(Japan) K Sugiyama	21	21

Second round
(India) M Singh	17	21	21
(Chinese Taipei) Chen S-y	21	13	9
PFQ	(Thailand) Y Ketklieng	21	22
2	(Japan) K Sugiyama	19	20

Quarter-finals
(India) M Singh	22	21
PFQ	(Thailand) Y Ketklieng	20	18

== Men's doubles ==
=== Seeds ===
1. (Denmark) William Kryger Boe / Christian Faust Kjær (first round)
2. (India) Hariharan Amsakarunan / Ruban Kumar Rethinasabapathi (quarter-finals)
3. (England) Rory Easton / Alex Green (second round)
4. (Malaysia) Lau Yi Sheng / Lee Yi Bo (quarter-finals)
5. (China) Cui Hechen / Peng Jianqin (semi-finals)
6. (France) Julien Maio / William Villeger (quarter-finals)
7. (China) Sun Wenjun / Zhu Yijun (second round)
8. (India) Ishaan Bhatnagar / Sankar Prasad (first round)

=== Finals ===
Semi-finals
(China) Huang Di (China) Liu Yang	21	18	21
(Japan) Masayuki Onodera (Japan) Daigo Tanioka	17	21	13
(Malaysia) Chia Wei Jie (Malaysia) Lwi Sheng Hao	18	21	21
5	(China) Cui Hechen (China) Peng Jianqin	21	16	10

Final
(China) Huang Di (China) Liu Yang	22	15	17
(Malaysia) Chia Wei Jie (Malaysia) Lwi Sheng Hao	20	21	21

=== Top half ===
==== Section 1 ====
First round
1	(Denmark) W K Boe (Denmark) C F Kjær	20	15
(China) Huang D (China) Liu Y	22	21
Q3	(India) B R Arigela (India) V T Gobburu	21	21
(India) A R Doddavarapu (India) S Elango	16	14
6	(France) J Maio (France) W Villeger	17	21	21
(India) A Makhija (India) S Tamboli	21	16	17
Q4	(India) Ar Mohammad (India) S Saraswat	16	19
Q1	(India) B Chhabra (India) P Choudhary	21	21

Second round
(China) Huang D (China) Liu Y	21	21
Q3	(India) B R Arigela (India) V T Gobburu	17	7
6	(France) J Maio (France) W Villeger	21	21
Q1	(India) B Chhabra (India) P Choudhary	9	12

Quarter-finals
(China) Huang D (China) Liu Y	21	19	21
6	(France) J Maio (France) W Villeger	19	21	18

==== Section 2 ====
First round
3	(England) R Easton (England) A Green	21	21
(Bahrain) M Muanis (United Arab Emirates) M Munawar	9	17
(China) Chen XJ (China) Guo RH	14	15
(Japan) K Kumagai (Japan) H Nishi	21	21
7	(China) Sun WJ (China) Zhu YJ	21	21
Q2	(India) N Ranjan (India) A Surya	15	16
(Japan) M Onodera (Japan) D Tanioka	21	21
(India) S S Dhanraj (India) S P Karri	7	6

Second round
3	(England) R Easton (England) A Green	18	10
(Japan) K Kumagai (Japan) H Nishi	21	21
7	(China) Sun WJ (China) Zhu YJ	13	22
(Japan) M Onodera (Japan) D Tanioka	21	24

Quarter-finals
(Japan) K Kumagai (Japan) H Nishi	15	16
(Japan) M Onodera (Japan) D Tanioka	21	21

=== Bottom half ===
==== Section 3 ====
First round
(India) A Mohanty (India) A Pattanayak	21	9	21
(India) Vip Kuvale (India) Vir Kuvale	19	21	14
(Malaysia) Chia W J (Malaysia) Lwi S H	21	21
8	(India) I Bhatnagar (India) S Prasad	15	15
(India) Nithin H. V. (India) V H V R Veeramreddy	21	21
(India) A Patharkar (India) G Vittalji	9	14
(India) A Agarwal (India) N Kumar	21	15	12
4	(Malaysia) Lau Y S (Malaysia) Lee Y B	19	21	21

Second round
(India) A Mohanty (India) A Pattanayak	11	13
(Malaysia) Chia W J (Malaysia) Lwi S H	21	21
(India) Nithin H. V. (India) V H V R Veeramreddy	18	9
4	(Malaysia) Lau Y S (Malaysia) Lee Y B	21	21

Quarter-finals
(Malaysia) Chia W J (Malaysia) Lwi S H	19	21	21
4	(Malaysia) Lau Y S (Malaysia) Lee Y B	21	17	16

==== Section 4 ====
First round
(India) P Raj (India) G Shaik	21	21
PFQ	(India) C Joshi (India) M Rana	17	14
(India) D S Konthoujam (India) Am Mohammad	7	9
5	(China) Cui HC (China) Peng JQ	21	21
(India) P Roy (India) K S Pratheek	21	19	16
(Malaysia) Lim T J (Malaysia) Wong T C	14	21	21
(Singapore) W Koh (Singapore) J Kubo	12	14
2	(India) H Amsakarunan (India) R K Rethinasabapathi	21	21

Second round
(India) P Raj (India) G Shaik	17	15
5	(China) Cui HC (China) Peng JQ	21	21
(Malaysia) Lim T J (Malaysia) Wong T C	13	22	19
2	(India) H Amsakarunan (India) R K Rethinasabapathi	21	20	21

Quarter-finals
5	(China) Cui HC (China) Peng JQ	21	21
2	(India) H Amsakarunan (India) R K Rethinasabapathi	10	19

== Women's doubles ==
=== Seeds ===
1. (India) Tanisha Crasto / Ashwini Ponnappa (champions)
2. (India) Rutaparna Panda / Swetaparna Panda (first round)
3. (India) Priya Konjengbam / Shruti Mishra (quarter-finals)
4. (Chinese Taipei) Cheng Yu-pei / Sun Yu-hsing (second round)
5. (China) Huang Kexin / Tang Ruizhi (quarter-finals)
6. (Hong Kong) Lui Lok Lok / Tsang Hiu Yan (semi-finals)
7. (Chinese Taipei) Chen Su-yu / Hsieh Yi-en (quarter-finals)
8. (China) Bao Lijing / Li Qian (quarter-finals)

=== Finals ===
Semi-finals
1	(India) Tanisha Crasto (India) Ashwini Ponnappa	21	21
(China) Keng Shuliang (China) Wang Tingge	14	14
6	(Hong Kong) Lui Lok Lok (Hong Kong) Tsang Hiu Yan	10	7
(China) Li Huazhou (China) Wang Zimeng	21	21

Final
1	(India) Tanisha Crasto (India) Ashwini Ponnappa	21	21
(China) Li Huazhou (China) Wang Zimeng	18	12

=== Top half ===
==== Section 1 ====
First round
1	(India) T Crasto (India) A Ponnappa	21	21
(India) T Hegde (India) R Thaker	13	11
Q1	(India) A Pramuthesh (India) S Singh	21	21
(United Arab Emirates) N Desai (United Arab Emirates) S S Parol	16	12
5	(China) Huang KX (China) Tang RZ	21	21
(India) D Nandakumar (India) A B Radhakrishnan	13	13
(India) R Ganesh (India) S Sikkandar	16	11
(India) K A Bhat (India) S Gautam	21	21

Second round
1	(India) T Crasto (India) A Ponnappa	21	21
Q1	(India) A Pramuthesh (India) S Singh	17	17
5	(China) Huang KX (China) Tang RZ	21	21
(India) K A Bhat (India) S Gautam	16	8

Quarter-finals
1	(India) T Crasto (India) A Ponnappa	21	21
5	(China) Huang KX (China) Tang RZ	18	13

==== Section 2 ====
First round
4	(Chinese Taipei) Cheng Y-p (Chinese Taipei) Sun Y-h	21	21
(India) A Khan (India) S S S Lakkamraju	16	10
Q4	(India) P Natarajan (India) R Ramasamy	14	12
(China) Keng SL (China) Wang TG	21	21
8	(China) Bao LJ (China) Li Q	21	21
(India) N Manglam (India) D R Balasubramanian	13	11
(India) K Kanwal (India) B Pal	17	21	17
(India) U Hooda (India) R K Toor	21	18	21

Second round
4	(Chinese Taipei) Cheng Y-p (Chinese Taipei) Sun Y-h	18	13
(China) Keng SL (China) Wang TG	21	21
8	(China) Bao LJ (China) Li Q	21	21
(India) U Hooda (India) R K Toor	16	12

Quarter-finals
(China) Keng SL (China) Wang TG	11
8	(China) Bao LJ (China) Li Q	8^{r}

=== Bottom half ===
==== Section 3 ====
First round
(India) A Karandikar (India) S Siya	15	22	13
(India) P Alvekar (India) M Deshpande	21	20	21
(India) R Das (India) P Holkar	9	7
6	(Hong Kong) Lui L L (Hong Kong) Tsang H Y	21	21
(India) A A Pai (India) N Ravishankar	21	10	21
Q2	(India) D Choudhary (India) N Valluvan	14	21	9
(India) K Gupta (India) R Sharma
3	(India) P Konjengbam (India) S Mishra	w	/	o

Second round
(India) P Alvekar (India) M Deshpande	8	10
6	(Hong Kong) Lui L L (Hong Kong) Tsang H Y	21	21
(India) A A Pai (India) N Ravishankar	17	15
3	(India) P Konjengbam (India) S Mishra	21	21

Quarter-finals
6	(Hong Kong) Lui L L (Hong Kong) Tsang H Y	21	19	21
3	(India) P Konjengbam (India) S Mishra	17	21	17

==== Section 4 ====
First round
PFQ	(India) K Gupta (India) L Srivastava	17	15
(India) G Rawat (India) M Rawat	21	21
(India) A Balan (India) T R G Krishna	17	11
7	(Chinese Taipei) Chen S-y (Chinese Taipei) Hsieh Y-e	21	21
PFQ	(India) A Balachandra (India) M Khan	w	/	o
Q3
(China) Li HZ (China) Wang ZM	21	21
2	(India) R Panda (India) S Panda	13	15

Second round
(India) G Rawat (India) M Rawat	11	17
7	(Chinese Taipei) Chen S-y (Chinese Taipei) Hsieh Y-e	21	21
PFQ	(India) A Balachandra (India) M Khan	5	6
(China) Li HZ (China) Wang ZM	21	21

Quarter-finals
7	(Chinese Taipei) Chen S-y (Chinese Taipei) Hsieh Y-e	21	12	11
(China) Li HZ (China) Wang ZM	17	21	21

== Mixed doubles ==
=== Seeds ===
1. (India) Sathish Karunakaran / Aadya Variyath (second round)
2. (Malaysia) Wong Tien Ci / Lim Chiew Sien (quarter-finals)
3. (India) Rohan Kapoor / Ruthvika Gadde (first round)
4. (India) Ashith Surya / Amrutha Pramuthesh (quarter-finals)
5. (India) Dhruv Kapila / Tanisha Crasto (semi-finals)
6. (Singapore) Terry Hee / Jin Yujia (semi-finals)
7. (France) Julien Maio / Léa Palermo (second round)
8. (India) Tarun Kona / Sri Krishna Priya Kudaravalli (first round)

=== Finals ===
Semi-finals
5	(India) Dhruv Kapila (India) Tanisha Crasto	22	11
(China) Zhang Hanyu (China) Bao Lijing	24	21
(England) Rory Easton (England) Lizzie Tolman	17	21	21
6	(Singapore) Terry Hee (Singapore) Jin Yujia	21	16	10

Final
(China) Zhang Hanyu (China) Bao Lijing	21	21
(England) Rory Easton (England) Lizzie Tolman	15	16

=== Top half ===
==== Section 1 ====
First round
1	(India) S Karunakaran (India) A Variyath	21	21
(India) Nithin H. V. (India) A A Pai	14	10
(India) S R Kanapuram (India) V Khadkekar	21	21
(India) C Joshi (India) K Gupta	17	15
5	(India) D Kapila (India) T Crasto	22	21
(China) Liao PY (China) Huang KX	20	19
(India) F S Aman (India) A Karandikar	11	21	17
(India) A Agarwal (India) S Mishra	21	18	21

Second round
1	(India) S Karunakaran (India) A Variyath	21	13	17
(India) S R Kanapuram (India) V Khadkekar	18	21	21
5	(India) D Kapila (India) T Crasto	15	21	21
(India) A Agarwal (India) S Mishra	21	10	11

Quarter-finals
(India) S R Kanapuram (India) V Khadkekar	16	14
5	(India) D Kapila (India) T Crasto	21	21

==== Section 2 ====
First round
4	(India) A Surya (India) A Pramuthesh	21	21
(India) S Goala (India) N Manglam	12	12
(India) D S Konthoujam (India) M Kshetrimayum	21	21
(India) Subramanian S (India) G Krishna	11	13
7	(France) J Maio (France) L Palermo	21	21
(India) M Jaglan (India) L Jaglan	7	14
(India) N Kumar (India) R K Toor	14	20
(China) Zhang HY (China) Bao LJ	21	22

Second round
4	(India) A Surya (India) A Pramuthesh	21	18	21
(India) D S Konthoujam (India) M Kshetrimayum	14	21	16
7	(France) J Maio (France) L Palermo	10	16
(China) Zhang HY (China) Bao LJ	21	21

Quarter-finals
4	(India) A Surya (India) A Pramuthesh	13	15
(China) Zhang HY (China) Bao LJ	21	21

=== Bottom half ===
==== Section 3 ====
First round
Q1	(India) R Mohankumar (India) R Ramasamy	21	21
(India) H Kothari (India) A Balachandra	10	13
Q2	(India) A Patharkar (India) K Kanwal	21	21
8	(India) T Kona (India) S K P Kudaravalli	14	12
(India) G Shaik (India) K. Maneesha	22	12	21
(India) A Suresh (India) D Nandakumar	20	21	12
(England) R Easton (England) L Tolman	21	19	21
3	(India) R Kapoor (India) R Gadde	11	21	12

Second round
Q1	(India) R Mohankumar (India) R Ramasamy	21	14	21
Q2	(India) A Patharkar (India) K Kanwal	15	21	14
(India) G Shaik (India) K. Maneesha	17	18
(England) R Easton (England) L Tolman	21	21

Quarter-finals
Q1	(India) R Mohankumar (India) R Ramasamy	16	11
(England) R Easton (England) L Tolman	21	21

==== Section 4 ====
First round
(India) S S Dhanraj (India) T Hegde	21	21
Q4	(India) K Wong (India) N Valluvan	16	11
(China) Gao JX (China) Tang RZ	13	12
6	(Singapore) T Hee (Singapore) Jin Y J	21	21
Q3	(India) B R Arigela (India) V Kalagotla	21	19	21
(India) S Elango (India) D A Arun	12	21	16
(India) B Navaneeth (India) R Thaker	21	14
2	(Malaysia) Wong T C (Malaysia) Lim C S	23	21

Second round
(India) S S Dhanraj (India) T Hegde	12	9
6	(Singapore) T Hee (Singapore) Jin Y J	21	21
Q3	(India) B R Arigela (India) V Kalagotla	21	15	9
2	(Malaysia) Wong T C (Malaysia) Lim C S	18	21	21

Quarter-finals
6	(Singapore) T Hee (Singapore) Jin Y J	21	21
2	(Malaysia) Wong T C (Malaysia) Lim C S	14	18

Preceded by 2024 Syed Modi International	BWF World Tour; 2024 BWF season	Succeeded by 2024 BWF World Tour Finals; 2024 Odisha Masters
