= 2023 Odisha Masters =

Badminton tournament in India

Tournament details
- Dates: 12–17 December
- Edition: 2nd
- Level: Super 100
- Total prize money: US$100,000
- Venue: Jawaharlal Nehru Indoor Stadium
- Location: Cuttack, Odisha, India

Champions
- Men's singles: (India) Sathish Karunakaran
- Women's singles: (Japan) Nozomi Okuhara
- Men's doubles: (Chinese Taipei) Lin Bing-wei (Chinese Taipei) Su Ching-heng
- Women's doubles: (Indonesia) Meilysa Trias Puspita Sari (Indonesia) Rachel Allessya Rose
- Mixed doubles: (India) Dhruv Kapila (India) Tanisha Crasto

The 2023 Odisha Masters (officially known as Yonex-Sunrise Odisha Masters 2023 for sponsorship reasons) was a badminton tournament which took place at the Jawaharlal Nehru Indoor Stadium, Cuttack, Odisha, India from 12 to 17 December 2023. It had a total prize pool of US$100,000.

== Tournament ==
The 2023 Odisha Masters was the ninth and final tournament of the 2023 BWF World Tour. It was the second edition of the Odisha Masters. The tournament was organized by the Badminton Association of India with sanction from the BWF.

=== Venue ===
This international tournament was held at the Jawaharlal Nehru Indoor Stadium in Cuttack, Odisha, India.

=== Point distribution ===
Below is the point distribution table for each phase of the tournament based on the BWF points system for the BWF Tour Super 100 event.

Winner	Runner-up	3/4	5/8	9/16	17/32	33/64	65/128	129/256
5,500	4,680	3,850	3,030	2,110	1,290	510	240	100

=== Prize money ===
The total prize money was US$100,000 with the distribution of the prize money in accordance with BWF regulations.

Event	Winner	Finalist	Semi-finals	Quarter-finals	Last 16
Singles	$7,500	$3,800	$1,450	$600	$350
Doubles	$7,900	$3,800	$1,400	$725	$375

== Men's singles ==
=== Seeds ===
1. (India) Priyanshu Rajawat (second round)
2. (India) Kiran George (semi-finals)
3. (Denmark) Mads Christophersen (third round)
4. (France) Alex Lanier (withdrew)
5. (India) Mithun Manjunath (third round)
6. (India) Sathish Karunakaran (champion)
7. (Spain) Luís Enrique Peñalver (second round)
8. (India) Sankar Subramanian (withdrew)

=== Final ===
Semi-finals
(Indonesia) Alwi Farhan	21	14	20
PFQ	(India) Ayush Shetty	19	21	22
6	(India) Sathish Karunakaran	21	21
2	(India) Kiran George	18	14

Final
PFQ	(India) Ayush Shetty	18	21	14
6	(India) Sathish Karunakaran	21	19	21

=== Top half ===
==== Section 1 ====
First round
(Indonesia) A Farhan	21	9	21
(India) V Vasudevan	10	21	16
(India) S Gupta	21	22
(India) H M Gowda	10	20
(India) H Aggarwal	21	7	9^{r}
(Mauritius) J Paul	15	21	15
(Indonesia) A W Chairullah	21	21
Q4	(India) S P Singh	12	10

Second round
1	(India) P Rajawat	11	22	12
(Indonesia) A Farhan	21	20	21
Q2	(India) A Bhivpathaki	19	21	23
(India) S Gupta	21	10	21
PFQ	(Indonesia) J C Alexander	21	21
(Mauritius) J Paul	17	18
(Canada) B. R. Sankeerth	21	6	11
(Indonesia) A W Chairullah	19	21	21

Third round
(Indonesia) A Farhan	21	16	21
Q2	(India) A Bhivpathaki	12	21	14
PFQ	(Indonesia) J C Alexander	18	17
(Indonesia) A W Chairullah	21	21

Quarter-finals
(Indonesia) A Farhan	21	12	21
(Indonesia) A W Chairullah	16	21	14

==== Section 2 ====
First round
PFQ	(India) A Shetty	21	16	21
PFQ	(India) T Mannepalli	19	21	14
(Chinese Taipei) Kuo K-l	21	15	10
PFQ	(Indonesia) T Sulistio	9	21	21
(Sri Lanka) D Abeywickrama	21	21
(Austria) L Wraber	16	15
Q6	(Indonesia) B R T Gotama	21	14	8
Q5	(India) O Chaliha	15	21	21

Second round
PFQ	(Indonesia) M R Al Fajri	21	9	20
PFQ	(India) A Shetty	19	21	22
(Chinese Taipei) Yang Y	21	16	16
PFQ	(Indonesia) T Sulistio	19	21	21
5	(India) M Manjunath	21	21
(Sri Lanka) D Abeywickrama	12	18
PFQ	(India) S Dey	21	21
Q5	(India) O Chaliha	16	10

Third round
PFQ	(India) A Shetty	14	21	21
PFQ	(Indonesia) T Sulistio	21	11	9
5	(India) M Manjunath	21	14	15
PFQ	(India) S Dey	15	21	21

Quarter-finals
PFQ	(India) A Shetty	21	21
PFQ	(India) S Dey	16	14

=== Bottom half ===
==== Section 3 ====
First round
(Israel) D Dubovenko	21	21
Q8	(India) A Tandon	16	15
(India) H Dani	18	21	21
(India) A Mishra	21	17	15
(India) C Sen	21	21
Q3	(India) S Dayanand Shimoga	12	9
(India) A Yeligar	11	14
(India) Ravi	21	21

Second round
(Israel) D Dubovenko	21	21
(India) S Dalal	14	12
(India) H Dani	26	5	7
6	(India) S Karunakaran	24	21	21
(India) C Sen	21	21
PFQ	(India) V Kapur	19	9
(India) Ravi	22	12
3	(Denmark) M Christophersen	24	21

Third round
(Israel) D Dubovenko	17	17
6	(India) S Karunakaran	21	21
(India) C Sen	21	15	21
3	(Denmark) M Christophersen	10	21	17

Quarter-finals
6	(India) S Karunakaran	21	21
(India) C Sen	10	16

==== Section 4 ====
First round
Q1	(India) A Thakur	15	19
(India) M Maisnam	21	21
(Nepal) P Dahal	15	8
(Indonesia) Y S Marcellyno	21	21
Q7	(India) A Yadav	16	21	16
PFQ	(Indonesia) I D Syahputra	21	18	21
(India) A Hari	16	11
(India) R Sanjeevi	21	21

Second round
(India) M Maisnam	21	8	22
(India) K Gulshan Kumar	16	21	20
(Indonesia) Y S Marcellyno	21	21
7	(Spain) L E Peñalver	19	12
PFQ	(Indonesia) I D Syahputra	21	20	21
(United States) K A Walter	9	22	8
(India) R Sanjeevi	12	21	12
2	(India) K George	21	10	21

Third round
(India) M Maisnam	21	10	21
(Indonesia) Y S Marcellyno	19	21	14
PFQ	(Indonesia) I D Syahputra	14	16
2	(India) K George	21	21

Quarter-finals
(India) M Maisnam	10	16
2	(India) K George	21	21

== Women's singles ==
=== Seeds ===
1. (Chinese Taipei) Hsu Wen-chi (second round)
2. (Chinese Taipei) Sung Shuo-yun (first round)
3. (Denmark) Line Christophersen (semi-finals)
4. (Japan) Nozomi Okuhara (champion)
5. (India) Aakarshi Kashyap (first round)
6. (Indonesia) Ester Nurumi Tri Wardoyo (withdrew)
7. (Thailand) Pitchamon Opatniputh (withdrew)
8. (United States) Lauren Lam (withdrew)

=== Final ===
Semi-finals
(Hong Kong) Lo Sin Yan	11	22	24
3	(Denmark) Line Christophersen	21	20	22
4	(Japan) Nozomi Okuhara	21	21
(India) Unnati Hooda	16	5

Final
(Hong Kong) Lo Sin Yan	7	23	20
4	(Japan) Nozomi Okuhara	21	21	22

=== Top half ===
==== Section 1 ====
First round
1	(Chinese Taipei) Hsu W-c	21	21
PFQ	(Poland) W Dabczynska	14	14
(Hong Kong) Lo S Y	21	21
(Chinese Taipei) Chiu P-c	12	18
5	(India) A Kashyap	21	12	15
(Denmark) A Schulz	8	21	21
(Hungary) V Sándorházi	20	18
(Denmark) J D Jakobsen	22	20

Second round
1	(Chinese Taipei) Hsu W-c	15	16
(Hong Kong) Lo S Y	21	21
(Denmark) A Schulz	12	6
(Denmark) J D Jakobsen	21	21

Quarter-finals
(Hong Kong) Lo S Y	21	21
(Denmark) J D Jakobsen	15	11

==== Section 2 ====
First round
3	(Denmark) L Christophersen	21	21
(India) T Hemanth	5	9
(India) T Mir	21	21
PFQ	(India) I Sharma	19	16
PFQ	(India) M Singh	16	12
(India) Samiya I F	21	21
(Chinese Taipei) Huang C-p	21	21
Q4	(India) I Baruah	14	12

Second round
3	(Denmark) L Christophersen	21	21
(India) T Mir	16	14
(India) Samiya I F	16	10
(Chinese Taipei) Huang C-p	21	21

Quarter-finals
3	(Denmark) L Christophersen	21	13	22
(Chinese Taipei) Huang C-p	13	21	20

=== Bottom half ===
==== Section 3 ====
First round
Q1	(Indonesia) Ruzana	21	21
Q3	(India) L Srivastava	11	12
PFQ	(Indonesia) T Farahnailah	21	13	21
PFQ	(Indonesia) B Prasista	19	21	9
(Malaysia) Kisona S
(Indonesia) S Widjaja	w	/	o
PFQ	(United States) I Jaiswal	14	15
4	(Japan) N Okuhara	21	21

Second round
Q1	(Indonesia) Ruzana	21	23	21
PFQ	(Indonesia) T Farahnailah	10	25	14
(Indonesia) S Widjaja	11	16
4	(Japan) N Okuhara	21	21

Quarter-finals
Q1	(Indonesia) Ruzana	5	13
4	(Japan) N Okuhara	21	21

==== Section 4 ====
First round
(India) U Hooda	21	21
PFQ	(Uganda) H Kobugabe	10	8
(India) A Chaliha	21	21
PFQ	(Uganda) F Mohamed Rafi	14	6
(Israel) K Polikarpova	11	16
Q2	(India) S Valishetty	21	21
(India) A Upadhyaya	16	21	21
2	(Chinese Taipei) Sung S-y	21	19	17

Second round
(India) U Hooda	21	21
(India) A Chaliha	18	16
Q2	(India) S Valishetty	17	20
(India) A Upadhyaya	21	22

Quarter-finals
(India) U Hooda	16	21	21
(India) A Upadhyaya	21	7	15

== Men's doubles ==
=== Seeds ===
1. (Denmark) Daniel Lundgaard / Mads Vestergaard (quarter-finals)
2. (Malaysia) Lwi Sheng Hao / Jimmy Wong (second round)
3. (India) P. S. Ravikrishna / Sankar Prasad Udayakumar (first round)
4. (Indonesia) Raymond Indra / Daniel Edgar Marvino (first round)
5. (India) Dhruv Kapila / Vishnuvardhan Goud Panjala (second round)
6. (India) Krishna Prasad Garaga / K. Sai Pratheek (final)
7. (Chinese Taipei) Lin Bing-wei / Su Ching-heng (champions)
8. (Indonesia) Teges Satriaji Cahyo Hutomo / Christopher David Wijaya (semi-finals)

=== Final ===
Semi-finals
6	(India) Krishna Prasad Garaga (India) K. Sai Pratheek	21	17	21
8	(Indonesia) Teges Satriaji Cahyo Hutomo (Indonesia) Christopher David Wijaya	17	21	18
7	(Chinese Taipei) Lin Bing-wei (Chinese Taipei) Su Ching-heng	21	21
(Indonesia) Putra Erwiansyah (Indonesia) Patra Harapan Rindorindo	13	12

Final
6	(India) Krishna Prasad Garaga (India) K. Sai Pratheek	22	18	17
7	(Chinese Taipei) Lin Bing-wei (Chinese Taipei) Su Ching-heng	20	21	21

=== Top half ===
==== Section 1 ====
First round
1	(Denmark) D Lundgaard (Denmark) M Vestergaard	21	21
(India) S Prasad (India) Subramanian S	8	11
(India) P S Chhabra (India) V A Mondalika	12	17
Q2	(India) B S Reddy (India) A Surya	21	21
6	(India) K P Garaga (India) K S Pratheek	21	21
(India) A Mohammad (India) S Tamboli	16	17
(India) S S Dhanraj (India) S P Karri	21	21
Q1	(India) Nithin H. V. (India) C Joshi	19	11

Second round
1	(Denmark) D Lundgaard (Denmark) M Vestergaard	21	21
Q2	(India) B S Reddy (India) A Surya	10	16
6	(India) K P Garaga (India) K S Pratheek	21	21
(India) S S Dhanraj (India) S P Karri	11	16

Quarter-finals
1	(Denmark) D Lundgaard (Denmark) M Vestergaard	19	16
6	(India) K P Garaga (India) K S Pratheek	21	21

==== Section 2 ====
First round
4	(Indonesia) R Indra (Indonesia) D E Marvino	12	16
Q3	(India) S Goala (India) P Krishnamurthy Roy	21	21
(India) D Rambhiya (India) A Shetty	21	21
(India) S Gajendran (India) M Kathiravan	15	17
8	(Indonesia) T S C Hutomo (Indonesia) C D Wijaya	21	21
(India) P Raj (India) H Thandarang	19	19
(Bahrain) M Muanis (United Arab Emirates) M Munawar	21	21
Q4	(India) A Patharkar (India) P Ranade	17	16

Second round
Q3	(India) S Goala (India) P Krishnamurthy Roy	21	21
(India) D Rambhiya (India) A Shetty	12	15
8	(Indonesia) T S C Hutomo (Indonesia) C D Wijaya	21	21
(Bahrain) M Muanis (United Arab Emirates) M Munawar	17	16

Quarter-finals
Q3	(India) S Goala (India) P Krishnamurthy Roy	17	10
8	(Indonesia) T S C Hutomo (Indonesia) C D Wijaya	21	21

=== Bottom half ===
==== Section 3 ====
First round
(Iran) M M Mirshekari (Iran) S Sangtarash	8	21	21
(India) M S Khwairakpam (India) D S Konthoujam	21	14	13
(India) R Swarnkar (India) G Vittalji	9	7
7	(Chinese Taipei) Lin B-w (Chinese Taipei) Su C-h	21	21
(India) V Annadurai (India) N P Eswaramoorthy	21	21
PFQ	(India) V K Hanumaiah Ranganatha (India) C G Ponnaganti	18	16
(Denmark) W K Boe (Denmark) C F Kjær	12	21	21
3	(India) P. S. Ravikrishna (India) S P Udayakumar	21'	11	16

Second round
(Iran) M M Mirshekari (Iran) S Sangtarash	9	9
7	(Chinese Taipei) Lin B-w (Chinese Taipei) Su C-h	21	21
(India) V Annadurai (India) N P Eswaramoorthy	9	15
(Denmark) W K Boe (Denmark) C F Kjær	21	21

Quarter-finals
7	(Chinese Taipei) Lin B-w (Chinese Taipei) Su C-h	21	15	21
(Denmark) W K Boe (Denmark) C F Kjær	18	21	11

==== Section 4 ====
First round
(India) H Amsakarunan (India) R K Rethinasabapathi	21	21
(India) A R Doddavarapu (India) V H V R Veeramreddy	12	14
(United Arab Emirates) De Ayyappan (United Arab Emirates) Dh Ayyappan	12	16
5	(India) D Kapila (India) V G Panjala	21	21
(Indonesia) P Erwiansyah (Indonesia) P H Rindorindo	24	22
(India) D Rawat (India) C Sen	22	20
(Indonesia) M A Farizi (Indonesia) N Joaquin	13	21	18
2	(Malaysia) Lwi S H (Malaysia) J Wong	21	14	21

Second round
(India) H Amsakarunan (India) R K Rethinasabapathi	21	21
5	(India) D Kapila (India) V G Panjala	18	11
(Indonesia) P Erwiansyah (Indonesia) P H Rindorindo	21	15	21
2	(Malaysia) Lwi S H (Malaysia) J Wong	19	21	16

Quarter-finals
(India) H Amsakarunan (India) R K Rethinasabapathi	12	21	14
(Indonesia) P Erwiansyah (Indonesia) P H Rindorindo	21	19	21

== Women's doubles ==
=== Seeds ===
1. (India) Treesa Jolly / Gayatri Gopichand (withdrew)
2. (Bulgaria) Gabriela Stoeva / Stefani Stoeva (withdrew)
3. (India) Tanisha Crasto / Ashwini Ponnappa (final)
4. (Netherlands) Debora Jille / Cheryl Seinen (second round)
5. (Indonesia) Meilysa Trias Puspita Sari / Rachel Allessya Rose (champions)
6. (Hong Kong) Lui Lok Lok / Ng Wing Yung (quarter-finals)
7. (United States) Paula Lynn Cao Hok / Lauren Lam (withdrew)
8. (India) Ashwini Bhat / Shikha Gautam (first round)

=== Final ===
Semi-finals
5	(Indonesia) Meilysa Trias Puspita Sari (Indonesia) Rachel Allessya Rose	22	23
(Indonesia) Jesita Putri Miantoro (Indonesia) Febi Setianingrum	20	21
3	(India) Tanisha Crasto (India) Ashwini Ponnappa	21	21
(Indonesia) Arlya Nabila Thesa Munggaran (Indonesia) Agnia Sri Rahayu	17	13

Final
5	(Indonesia) Meilysa Trias Puspita Sari (Indonesia) Rachel Allessya Rose	21	21
3	(India) Tanisha Crasto (India) Ashwini Ponnappa	14	17

=== Top half ===
==== Section 1 ====
First round
PFQ	(India) Keerthika C H (India) D R Balasubramanian	19	21	21
(Uganda) H Kobugabe (Uganda) G Mbabazi	21	11	17
Q4	(India) G R Jaiswal (India) S Sikkandar	10	12
(Indonesia) S A M Asharunnisa (Indonesia) S S Azzahra	21	21
5	(Indonesia) M T Puspita Sari (Indonesia) R A Rose	21	21
PFQ	(India) A Pramuthesh (India) A Praveen	11	11
Q2	(India) K Mittal (India) D Prutha	11	13
(India) A Gahlawat (India) S Gahlawat	21	21

Second round
PFQ	(India) Keerthika C H (India) D R Balasubramanian	8	11
(Indonesia) S A M Asharunnisa (Indonesia) S S Azzahra	21	21
5	(Indonesia) M T Puspita Sari (Indonesia) R A Rose	21	21
(India) A Gahlawat (India) S Gahlawat	9	12

Quarter-finals
(Indonesia) S A M Asharunnisa (Indonesia) S S Azzahra	25	13
5	(Indonesia) M T Puspita Sari (Indonesia) R A Rose	27	21

==== Section 2 ====
First round
4	(Netherlands) D Jille (Netherlands) C Seinen	21	21
PFQ	(India) A Karandikar (India) A Singh	15	5
(Indonesia) J P Miantoro (Indonesia) F Setianingrum	21	21
(India) K Gupta (India) D Singh	14	13
8	(India) A Bhat (India) S Gautam	19	21	17
(India) R Panda (India) S Panda	21	17	21
(India) P Arora (India) U Hooda	7	13
(India) S Singhi (India) R Thaker	21	21

Second round
4	(Netherlands) D Jille (Netherlands) C Seinen	15	12
(Indonesia) J P Miantoro (Indonesia) F Setianingrum	21	21
(India) R Panda (India) S Panda	21	14	21
(India) S Singhi (India) R Thaker	12	21	19

Quarter-finals
(Indonesia) J P Miantoro (Indonesia) F Setianingrum	21	21
(India) R Panda (India) S Panda	9	15

=== Bottom half ===
==== Section 3 ====
First round
(India) Nik Rapria (India) Nis Rapria	14	9
(Indonesia) M R Fitria (Indonesia) M A Putri	21	21
(Chinese Taipei) Sung S-y (Chinese Taipei) Yu C-h	21	21
PFQ	(India) R Ganesh (India) N Manglam	5	14
Q1	(India) I Malik (India) T Malik	11	21	15
(India) A B Radhakrishnan (India) V V Sri	21	15	21
(United Arab Emirates) A Qathun (United Arab Emirates) N Rajesh	7	14
3	(India) T Crasto (India) A Ponnappa	21	21

Second round
(Indonesia) M R Fitria (Indonesia) M A Putri	13	9
(Chinese Taipei) Sung S-y (Chinese Taipei) Yu C-h	21	21
(India) A B Radhakrishnan (India) V V Sri	13	13
3	(India) T Crasto (India) A Ponnappa	21	21

Quarter-finals
(Chinese Taipei) Sung S-y (Chinese Taipei) Yu C-h	20	22	14
3	(India) T Crasto (India) A Ponnappa	22	20	21

==== Section 4 ====
First round
(India) S S S Lakkamraju (India) A A Pai	16	14
(India) P Konjengbam (India) S Mishra	21	21
PFQ	(India) D Nandakumar (India) R K Toor	13	17
6	(Hong Kong) Lui L L (Hong Kong) Ng W Y	21	21
(Indonesia) R A Fatasya (Indonesia) K Larissa	21	21
Q3	(India) U Jaral (India) M Khan	12	9
(Indonesia) A N T Munggaran (Indonesia) A S Rahayu	21	21
PFQ	(India) S Gupta (India) S Singh	18	16

Second round
(India) P Konjengbam (India) S Mishra	14	19
6	(Hong Kong) Lui L L (Hong Kong) Ng W Y	21	21
(Indonesia) R A Fatasya (Indonesia) K Larissa	16	22
(Indonesia) A N T Munggaran (Indonesia) A S Rahayu	21	24

Quarter-finals
6	(Hong Kong) Lui L L (Hong Kong) Ng W Y	16	16
(Indonesia) A N T Munggaran (Indonesia) A S Rahayu	21	21

== Mixed doubles ==
=== Seeds ===
1. (Singapore) Terry Hee / Jessica Tan (final)
2. (Germany) Mark Lamsfuß / Isabel Lohau (withdrew)
3. (Denmark) Mads Vestergaard / Christine Busch (semi-finals)
4. (Indonesia) Adnan Maulana / Nita Violina Marwah (semi-finals)
5. (Algeria) Koceila Mammeri / Tanina Mammeri (withdrew)
6. (Indonesia) Jafar Hidayatullah / Aisyah Salsabila Putri Pranata (withdrew)
7. (India) Sathish Kumar Karunakaran / Aadya Variyath (first round)
8. (India) B. Sumeeth Reddy / N. Sikki Reddy (quarter-finals)

=== Final ===
Semi-finals
1	(Singapore) Terry Hee (Singapore) Jessica Tan	21	19	21
4	(Indonesia) Adnan Maulana (Indonesia) Nita Violina Marwah	13	21	12
3	(Denmark) Mads Vestergaard (Denmark) Christine Busch	14	14
(India) Dhruv Kapila (India) Tanisha Crasto	21	21

Final
1	(Singapore) Terry Hee (Singapore) Jessica Tan	21	19	21
(India) Dhruv Kapila (India) Tanisha Crasto	17	21	23

=== Top half ===
==== Section 1 ====
First round
1	(Singapore) T Hee (Singapore) J Tan	21	21
(United Arab Emirates) Kuswanto (United Arab Emirates) S S Parol	13	15
(India) Nithin H. V. (India) R K Toor	23	21
(India) M S Khwairakpam (India) A A Pai	21	18
PFQ	(United Arab Emirates) S V Govindarasu (United Arab Emirates) A Qathun	11	15
(India) A Surya (India) A Pramuthesh	21	21
Q2	(India) L Viswanathan (India) A Chandramathi Subramani	21	21
(India) N P Eswaramoorthy (India) G Nellihankalu Shivashankar	13	11

Second round
1	(Singapore) T Hee (Singapore) J Tan	21	21
(India) Nithin H. V. (India) R K Toor	10	18
(India) A Surya (India) A Pramuthesh	13	22	9
Q2	(India) L Viswanathan (India) A Chandramathi Subramani	21	20	21

Quarter-finals
1	(Singapore) T Hee (Singapore) J Tan	21	19	21
Q2	(India) L Viswanathan (India) A Chandramathi Subramani	10	21	17

==== Section 2 ====
First round
4	(Indonesia) A Maulana (Indonesia) N V Marwah	22	21
(India) D S Konthoujam (India) P Konjengbam	20	9
Q1	(India) N K Abu Bakkar (India) A B Radhakrishnan	21	21
(India) T Kona (India) S K P Kudaravalli	19	16
PFQ	(India) N Kumar (India) N Manglam	23	29
(Indonesia) R Ramanda (Indonesia) I C S Jamil	21	27
(Germany) J R Jansen (Germany) Nguyen T P	21	21
(Thailand) W Phakjarung (Thailand) A Sapniti	9	18

Second round
4	(Indonesia) A Maulana (Indonesia) N V Marwah	21	21
Q1	(India) N K Abu Bakkar (India) A B Radhakrishnan	11	10
PFQ	(India) N Kumar (India) N Manglam	13	23	8
(Germany) J R Jansen (Germany) Nguyen T P	21	21	21

Quarter-finals
4	(Indonesia) A Maulana (Indonesia) N V Marwah	21	21
(Germany) J R Jansen (Germany) Nguyen T P	17	18

=== Bottom half ===
==== Section 3 ====
First round
(India) R Kapoor (India) A Ponnappa	21	21
(Malaysia) O Ting (Malaysia) Gan J E	19	15
Q3	(India) F S Aman (India) A Karandikar	9	15
8	(India) B S Reddy (India) N S Reddy	21	21
(India) V G Prasad (India) J Dewangan	8	11
PFQ	(India) H N B Thandrangi (India) A Balan	21	21
(Indonesia) V Y Mulia (Indonesia) P V Elsadai	17	11
3	(Denmark) M Vestergaard (Denmark) C Busch	21	21

Second round
(India) R Kapoor (India) A Ponnappa	14	21	14
8	(India) B S Reddy (India) N S Reddy	21	17	21
PFQ	(India) H N B Thandrangi (India) A Balan	21	12	16
3	(Denmark) M Vestergaard (Denmark) C Busch	17	21	21

Quarter-finals
8	(India) B S Reddy (India) N S Reddy	22	16	18
3	(Denmark) M Vestergaard (Denmark) C Busch	20	21	21

==== Section 4 ====
First round
(Indonesia) Z Nabawi (Indonesia) F Pasaribu	26	21	15
(Indonesia) A Syahnawi (Indonesia) W O Kandow	28	12	21
(India) D Kapila (India) T Crasto	21	17	21
7	(India) S Karunakaran (India) A Variyath	10	21	15
(India) C Joshi (India) K Gupta	18	19
(Indonesia) M Faza (Indonesia) J Rismawardani	21	21
Q4	(India) S Gajendran (India) J Ananthakumar	19	21	21
PFQ	(India) S Bharathsanjai (India) R Ganesh	21	16	15

Second round
(Indonesia) A Syahnawi (Indonesia) W O Kandow	16	12
(India) D Kapila (India) T Crasto	21	21
(Indonesia) M Faza (Indonesia) J Rismawardani	21	21
Q4	(India) S Gajendran (India) J Ananthakumar	13	16

Quarter-finals
(India) D Kapila (India) T Crasto	21	21
(Indonesia) M Faza (Indonesia) J Rismawardani	16	11

Preceded by 2023 Guwahati Masters	BWF World Tour; 2023 BWF season	Succeeded by 2024 Malaysia Open
