= Anmol Kharb =

Indian badminton player (born 2007)

Personal information
- Born: 20 January 2007 (age 19) Faridabad, Haryana, India
- Years active: 2023–present

Sport
- Country: India
- Sport: Badminton
- Handedness: Right
- Coached by: Parupalli Kashyap; Gurusai Dutt

Women's singles
- Career record: 47 wins, 19 losses
- Highest ranking: 40 (28 October 2025)
- Current ranking: 42 (10 November 2026)
- BWF profile
Medal record
Women's badminton
Representing India
Asian Team Championships
Gold medal – first place	2024 Selangor	Women's team

Anmol Kharb (born 20 January 2007) is an Indian badminton player. She won the gold at the Asia Team Championships.

== Early life ==
Kharb was born on 20 January 2007 in Faridabad, Haryana. She was inspired by her brother's passion for badminton. Despite her brother shifting focus away from the sport, Anmol continued pursued it with her family's support. She trained at Dayanand Public School in Faridabad and later joined Sunrise Shuttlers Academy in Noida under Coach Kusumm Singh.

== Career ==
=== Beginnings (2023–2024) ===
In 2023, Kharb won the gold at the National Championships. Her first international title victory at the senior level came when she won Belgian International 2024. She followed it up with her victory at Polish International 2024 thus winning two back-to-back international titles in a month.

Kharb played a very crucial role in the Indian women's team winning the gold medal at the Asia Team Championships 2024, the first time in the championships' history that the Indian women's team featured in the top three. She won all three of the matches she played, all of which were tie deciders. 472nd in the BWF World Ranking when the championships began, she beat Wu Luo Yu, ranked 149th, in the group stage, Natsuki Nidaira, ranked 29th, in the semi-finals and Pornpicha Choeikeewong, ranked 45th, in the finals.

== Achievements ==
=== BWF World Tour (1 runner-up) ===
The BWF World Tour, which was announced on 19 March 2017 and implemented in 2018, is a series of elite badminton tournaments sanctioned by the Badminton World Federation (BWF). The BWF World Tour is divided into levels of World Tour Finals, Super 1000, Super 750, Super 500, Super 300 (part of the HSBC World Tour), and the BWF Tour Super 100.

Women's singles
Year	Tournament	Level	Opponent	Score	Result
2024	Guwahati Masters	Super 100	(China) Cai Yanyan	21–14, 13–21, 19–21	(silver) Runner-up

=== BWF International Challenge / Series (3 titles, 1 runner-up) ===
Women's singles
Year	Tournament	Opponent	Score	Result
2024	Belgian International	(Denmark) Amalie Schulz	24–22, 12–21, 21–10	(gold) Winner
2024	Polish International	(Switzerland) Milena Schnider	21–12, 21–8	(gold) Winner
2025	Cameroon International	(Indonesia) Thalita Ramadhani Wiryawan	11–21, 19–21	(silver) Runner-up
2026	Türkiye International	(India) Aakarshi Kashyap	21–11, 21–14	(gold) Winner

BWF International Challenge tournament
BWF International Series tournament
BWF Future Series tournament

== Performance timeline ==
Key

W	Won	F	Finalist	SF	Semi-finalist
QF	Quarter-finalist	#R	Rounds 4, 3, 2, 1	RR	Round-robin stage
Q#	Qualification round	A	Absent	w/d	Withdrew
G	Gold	S	Silver	B	Bronze
NH	Not held	N/A	Not applicable	DNQ	Did not qualify

=== National team ===
- Senior level

Team events	2024	Ref
Asia Team Championships	G	
Uber Cup	QF	

=== Individual competitions ===
==== Junior level ====
Events	2023	Ref
Asia Junior Championships	3R	

==== Senior level ====
- Women's singles

Tournament	BWF World Tour			Best	Ref
Tournament	2024	2025	2026	Best	Ref
Indonesia Masters	A		2R	2R ('26)	
Thailand Masters	A		2R	2R ('26)	
German Open	A	1R	A	1R ('25)	
Swiss Open	A	1R	A	1R ('25)	
Orléans Masters	A		2R	2R ('26)	
Thailand Open	A		1R	1R ('26)	
Malaysia Masters	A	Q2	1R	1R ('26)	
Singapore Open	A	1R	A	1R ('25)	
Macau Open	A	1R	QF	QF ('26)	
U.S. Open	A	2R	1R	2R ('25)	
Canada Open	A		1R	1R ('26)	
Taipei Open	A	1R	2R	1R ('26)	
Korea Masters	A		2R	2R ('26)	
Indonesia Masters Super 100	Q1	1R	SF	SF ('26)	
Vietnam Open	A		1R	1R ('26)	
Al Ain Masters	NH	2R	NH	2R ('25)	
Arctic Open	A	SF	A	SF ('25)	
Malaysia Super 100	A		QF	QF ('26)	
Denmark Open	A	1R	A	1R ('25)	
French Open	A	1R	A	1R ('25)	
Hylo Open	A	1R	SF	SF ('26)	
Korea Open	A		2R	2R ('26)	
Hong Kong Open	A		1R	1R ('26)	
Syed Modi International	1R	1R		1R ('24, '25)	
Guwahati Masters	F	2R		F ('24)	
Odisha Masters	QF	QF		QF ('24, '25)	
Year-end ranking	67	57		40	
Tournament	2024	2025	2026	Best	

== Record against opponents ==
Record against Year-end Finals finalists, World Championships semi-finalists, and Olympic quarter-finalists. Accurate as of 30 November 2024.

Player	Matches	Win	Lost	Diff.
(China) Han Yue	1	0	1	–1
(India) P. V. Sindhu	1	0	1	–1
(China) Chen Yu Fei	1	0	1	–1

== Awards and nominations ==
Year	Award	Category	Result	Ref(s)
2024	Nakshatra Samman	Remarkable Achievement in Sports	Won	
2024	FICCI India Sports Awards	Emerging Sportsperson Female	Won	
2025	Times of India Sports Awards	Badminton Player of the Year Female	Won	

== See also ==
- Badminton in India
- India national badminton team
- List of Indian sportswomen
