= Priyanshu Rajawat =

Indian badminton player

Personal information
- Born: 1 February 2002 (age 24) Dhar, Madhya Pradesh, India
- Years active: 2019–present

Sport
- Country: India
- Sport: Badminton
- Handedness: Right
- Coached by: Pullela Gopichand

Men's singles
- Highest ranking: 28 (8 August 2023)
- BWF profile
Medal record
Men's badminton
Representing India
Thomas Cup
Gold medal – first place	2022 Bangkok	Men's team

Priyanshu Rajawat (born 1 February 2002) is an Indian badminton player. He was part of the India team that won the 2022 Thomas Cup.

== Achievements ==
=== BWF World Tour (1 title, 1 runner-up) ===
The BWF World Tour, which was announced on 19 March 2017 and implemented in 2018, is a series of elite badminton tournaments sanctioned by the Badminton World Federation (BWF). The BWF World Tour is divided into levels of World Tour Finals, Super 1000, Super 750, Super 500, Super 300, and the BWF Tour Super 100.

Men's singles
Year	Tournament	Level	Opponent	Score	Result
2022	Odisha Open	Super 100	(India) Kiran George	15–21, 21–14, 18–21	(silver) Runner-up
2023	Orléans Masters	Super 300	(Denmark) Magnus Johannesen	21–15, 19–21, 21–16	(gold) Winner

=== BWF International Challenge/Series (4 titles, 1 runner-up) ===
Men's singles
Year	Tournament	Opponent	Score	Result
2019	Bahrain International	(Canada) Jason Ho-Shue	16–21, 21–7, 21–12	(gold) Winner
2021	Ukraine International	(India) Sathish Kumar Karunakaran	21–17, 21–18	(gold) Winner
2021	India International Challenge	(India) Raghu Mariswamy	12–21, 21–10, 21–8	(gold) Winner
2022 (II)	India International Challenge	(India) Subhankar Dey	21–13, 21–11	(gold) Winner
2022	Bangladesh International	(India) Mithun Manjunath	12–21, 21–16, 9–21	(silver) Runner-up

BWF International Challenge tournament
BWF International Series tournament

== Performance timeline ==
Key

W	Won	F	Finalist	SF	Semi-finalist
QF	Quarter-finalist	#R	Rounds 4, 3, 2, 1	RR	Round-robin stage
Q#	Qualification round	A	Absent	w/d	Withdrew
G	Gold	S	Silver	B	Bronze
NH	Not held	N/A	Not applicable	DNQ	Did not qualify

=== National team ===
- Junior level

Team events	2018
Asian Junior Championships	QF
World Junior Championships	6th

- Senior level

Team events	2022	2024
Thomas Cup	G	QF

=== Individual competitions ===
- Junior level

Event	2018
Asian Junior Championships	4R
World Junior Championships	3R

- Senior level

Events	2024	2025
Asian Championships	1R	2R

Tournament	BWF World Tour					Best
Tournament	2022	2023	2024	2025	2026	Best
Malaysia Open	NH			1R	A	1R ('25)
India Open	1R	A	2R	1R	A	2R ('24)
Indonesia Masters	A	1R	2R	1R	A	2R ('24)
Thailand Masters	NH	1R	A		1R	1R ('23, '26)
German Open	A			2R		2R ('25)
Orléans Masters	2R	W	A	1R		W ('23)
All England Open	A		1R	A		1R ('24)
Swiss Open	A	Q1	QF	2R		QF ('24)
Taipei Open	2R	A				2R ('22)
Thailand Open	Q2	1R	A	1R		1R ('23, '25)
Malaysia Masters	A			1R		1R ('25)
Singapore Open	A	2R	1R	1R		2R ('23)
Indonesia Open	A	2R	2R	A		2R ('23, '24)
U.S. Open	NH	A	QF	1R		QF ('24)
Canada Open	A		SF	1R		SF ('24)
Japan Open	A	1R	A			1R ('23)
Korea Open	A	2R	A			2R ('23)
Vietnam Open	2R	A				2R ('22)
Hong Kong Open	A	1R	1R	A		1R ('23, '24)
China Open	A	1R	1R	A		1R ('23, '24)
French Open	A		1R	A		1R ('24)
Japan Masters	A	1R	A			1R ('23)
China Masters	A	1R	1R	A		1R ('23, '24)
Australian Open	A	SF	A			SF ('23)
Syed Modi International	2R	SF	SF	QF		SF ('23, '24)
Guwahati Masters	NH	A	3R	w/d		3R ('24)
Odisha Masters	F	2R	w/d	3R		F ('22)
Spain Masters	A	2R	A	NH		2R ('23)
Year-end ranking	50	31	34	54		28
Tournament	2022	2023	2024	2025	2026	Best

== See also ==
- Badminton in India
- India national badminton team
