= Unnati Hooda =

Indian badminton player (born 2007)

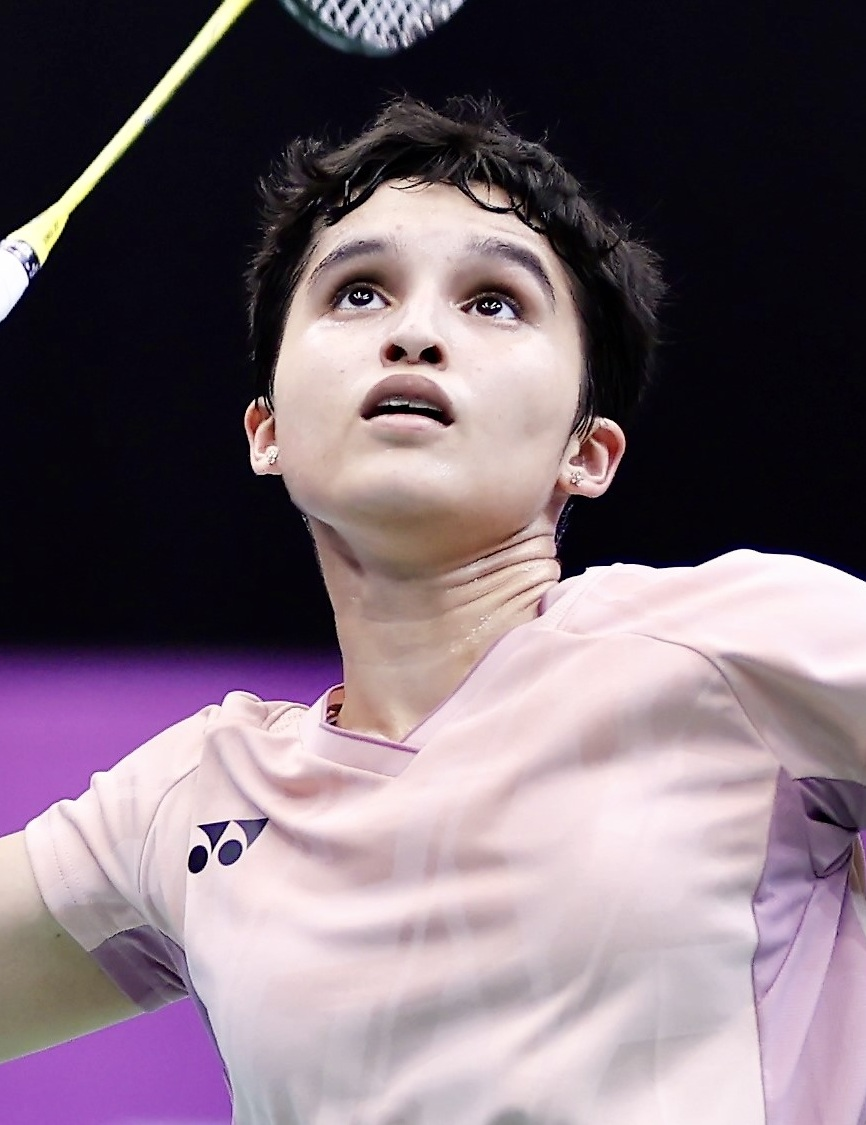
- Unnati at the 2025 Taipei Open

Personal information
- Born: 20 September 2007 (age 19) Rohtak, Haryana, India
- Years active: 2021–present
- Height: 1.67 m (5 ft 6 in)

Sport
- Country: India
- Sport: Badminton
- Handedness: Right

Women's singles
- Career record: 77 wins, 40 losses
- Highest ranking: 18 (13 October 2026)
- Current ranking: 23 (3 November 2026)
- BWF profile
Medal record
Women's badminton
Representing India
World Junior Championships
Bronze medal – third place	2025 Guwahati	Mixed team

Unnati Hooda (born 20 September 2007) is an Indian badminton player. She was a member of the 2022 Uber Cup Indian team.

== Early life ==
Hooda was born on 20 September 2007 in Rohtak, Haryana. She was seven years old when she started playing badminton. Her father Upkar Hooda was passionate about badminton and enrolled her at the Chottu Ram Stadium badminton academy.

== Career ==
=== 2021–22: First senior title ===
In 2021, Hooda's first tournament was the India International Challenge where she lost to Anupama Upadhyaya in the finals. In January 2022, Unnati played in the 2022 Odisha Open where she won the tournament beating Smit Toshniwal in the finals, winning her first ever BWF World Tour tournament. She was a silver medalist at the 2022 Badminton Asia Junior U17 and U15 Championships held in Nonthaburi, Thailand in the U17 singles event.

=== 2023: Abu Dhabi Masters title ===
In 2023, Unnati Hooda defeated compatriot Samiya Farooqui in the 2023 Abu Dhabi Masters finals and won her second BWF World Tour Title. She then won the India International Challenge by beating compatriot Tasnim Mir in straight games.

== Achievements ==
=== World Tour (3 titles) ===
The BWF World Tour, which was announced on 19 March 2017 and implemented in 2018, is a series of elite badminton tournaments sanctioned by the Badminton World Federation. The World Tour is divided into levels of World Tour Finals, Super 1000, Super 750, Super 500, Super 300 (part of the HSBC World Tour), and the Tour Super 100.

Women's singles
Year	Tournament	Level	Opponent	Score	Result	Ref.
2022	Odisha Masters	Super 100	(India) Smit Toshniwal	21–18, 21–11	(gold) Winner	
2023	Abu Dhabi Masters	Super 100	(India) Samiya Farooqui	21–16, 22–20	(gold) Winner	
2025	Odisha Masters	Super 100	(India) Isharani Baruah	21–17, 21–10	(gold) Winner	

=== International Challenge (2 titles, 3 runners-up) ===
Women's singles
Year	Tournament	Opponent	Score	Result	Ref.
2021	India International	(India) Anupama Upadhyaya	19–21, 16–21	(silver) Runner-up	
2023 I	India International	(India) Isharani Baruah	21–13, 19–21, 11–21	(silver) Runner-up	
2023 II	India International	(India) Tasnim Mir	21–18, 21–10	(gold) Winner	
2025	Singapore International	(Indonesia) Ruzana	17–21, 16–21	(silver) Runner-up	
2026	Polish Open	(Ukraine) Polina Buhrova	10–21, 21–15, 21–8	(gold) Winner	

BWF International Challenge tournament
BWF International Series tournament
BWF Future Series tournament

=== Junior International (1 runner-up) ===
Girls' singles
Year	Tournament	Opponent	Score	Result	Ref.
2022	India Junior International	(Thailand) Sarunrak Vitidsarn	25–23, 17–21, 10–21	(silver) Runner-up	

BWF Junior International Grand Prix tournament
BWF Junior International Challenge tournament
BWF Junior International Series tournament
BWF Junior Future Series tournament

== Performance timeline ==
Key

W	Won	F	Finalist	SF	Semi-finalist
QF	Quarter-finalist	#R	Rounds 4, 3, 2, 1	RR	Round-robin stage
Q#	Qualification round	A	Absent	w/d	Withdrew
G	Gold	S	Silver	B	Bronze
NH	Not held	N/A	Not applicable	DNQ	Did not qualify

=== Tournaments ===
Senior events

Event	2022	2023	2024	2025	2026	Ref
Individual
Olympic Games	NH	NH	A	NH	NH	
World Championships	A	A	NH	A	2R	
Asian Games	A	NH			QF	
Asian Championships	A	A	A	A	2R	
Team
Uber Cup	QF	NH	A	NH	RR	
Sudirman Cup	NH	A	NH	A	NH	
Asian Games	A	NH			QF	
Asian Team Championships	A	NH	A	NH	A	
Asian Mixed Championships	NH	A	NH	A	NH	

Junior events

Event	2022	2023	2024	2025	Ref
Individual
World Championships	4R	3R	A	QF	
Team
World Championships	13th	7th	A	B	

=== World Tour ===
Women's singles

Tournament	World Tour					Best	Ref
Tournament	2022	2023	2024	2025	2026	Best	Ref
Thailand Masters	NH	Q2	A			Q2 ('23)	
German Open	A			QF	A	QF ('25)	
All England Open	A				1R	1R ('26)	
Swiss Open	A				1R	1R ('26)	
Orléans Masters	A			1R	A	1R ('25)	
Thailand Open	A	Q1	1R	2R	1R	2R ('25)	
Baoji China Masters	NA		QF	A		QF ('24)	
Malaysia Masters	A		1R	1R	w/d	1R ('24, '25)	
Singapore Open	A			1R	1R	1R ('25, '26)	
Indonesia Open	A				1R	1R ('26)	
Macau Open	NH		A	1R	A	1R ('25)	
Japan Open	A			1R	1R	1R ('25, '26)	
China Open	A			QF	1R	QF ('25)	
Taipei Open	A			SF	SF	SF ('25, '26)	
China Masters	A				1R	1R ('26)	
Al Ain Masters	NA	W	NH	A	NH	W ('23)	
Arctic Open	A		2R	A	1R	2R ('24)	
Denmark Open	A		1R	A	1R	1R ('24, '26)	
French Open	A			2R	1R	2R ('25)	
Hylo Open	A			SF	QF	SF ('25)	
Hong Kong Open	NH	A			1R	1R ('26)	
Syed Modi International	A	2R	SF	SF		SF ('24, '25)	
Guwahati Masters	NA	2R	1R	A		2R ('23)	
Odisha Masters	W	SF	A	W		W ('22, '25)	
Year-end ranking	137	56	80	23		23	

Women's doubles

Tournament	World Tour			Best	Ref
Tournament	2023	2024	2025	Best	Ref
Guwahati Masters	2R	2R		2R ('23, '24)	

== Record against opponents ==
Record against Year-end Finals finalists, World Championships semi-finalists, and Olympic quarter-finalists. Accurate as of 1 November 2025.

Player	Matches	Win	Lost	Diff.
(China) Wang Zhiyi	2	0	2	–2
(Indonesia) Putri Kusuma Wardani	1	0	1	–1
(India) P. V. Sindhu	2	1	1	0
(Japan) Akane Yamaguchi	1	0	1	–1
(Japan) Nozomi Okuhara	2	0	2	–2
(South Korea) An Se-young	1	0	1	–1

== See also ==
- Badminton in India
- India national badminton team
- List of Indian sportswomen
