= Liu Yang (badminton) =

Chinese badminton player (born 2003)

Liu Yang 刘阳
Personal information
- Born: 14 May 2003 (age 23) Anhui, China
- Height: 178 cm (5 ft 10 in)

Sport
- Country: China
- Sport: Badminton
- Handedness: Right

Men's doubles
- Highest ranking: 17 (with Huang Di, 22 July 2025)
- Current ranking: 47 (with Huang Di, 27 October 2026)
- BWF profile
Medal record
Men's badminton
Representing China
Asia Mixed Team Championships
Silver medal – second place	2025 Qingdao	Mixed team

Liu Yang (Chinese: 刘阳; pinyin: Liú Yáng, born 14 May 2003) is a Chinese badminton player.

== Achievements ==
=== BWF World Tour (3 titles, 1 runner-up) ===
The BWF World Tour, which was announced on 19 March 2017 and implemented in 2018, is a series of elite badminton tournaments sanctioned by the Badminton World Federation (BWF). The BWF World Tours are divided into levels of World Tour Finals, Super 1000, Super 750, Super 500, Super 300, and the BWF Tour Super 100.

Men's doubles
Year	Tournament	Level	Partner	Opponent	Score	Result	Ref.
2024	Baoji China Masters	Super 100	(China) Huang Di	(China) Ma Shang (China) Zhu Haiyuan	21–17, 21–16	(gold) Winner	
2024	Syed Modi International	Super 300	(China) Huang Di	(India) Pruthvi Roy (India) Sai Pratheek K.	21–14, 19–21, 21–17	(gold) Winner	
2024	Guwahati Masters	Super 100	(China) Huang Di	(Malaysia) Chia Wei Jie (Malaysia) Lwi Sheng Hao	22–20, 15–21, 17–21	(silver) Runner-up	
2024	Odisha Masters	Super 100	(China) Huang Di	(Japan) Kakeru Kumagai (Japan) Hiroki Nishi	21–13, 19–21, 27–25	(gold) Winner	
