= Anupama Upadhyaya =

Indian badminton player

Personal information
- Born: 12 February 2005 (age 21) Almora, Uttarakhand, India
- Years active: 2020–present

Sport
- Country: India
- Sport: Badminton
- Handedness: Right
- Coached by: Park Tae-sang

Women's singles
- Career record: 102 wins, 43 losses
- Highest ranking: 38 (22 July 2025)
- Current ranking: 49 (24 February 2026)
- BWF profile

Anupama Upadhyaya (born 12 February 2005) is an Indian badminton player. She is a former BWF World Junior Number 1. She became the Indian National Badminton Champion in women's singles in 2023.

== Early life ==
Hailing from Almora, Uttarakhand, Upadhyaya first started playing badminton when she was sent to a summer camp by her father, Naveen, a former cricketer. She first started training under D. K. Sen (father of 2022 Commonwealth Games gold medalist Lakshya Sen).

== Career ==
In 2023, Upadhyaya won the Indian National Championships women's singles title at the age of 18, became the first girls' from Almora district to do so. She was elected to join national team to compete at the Asian Games in Hangzhou, China.

== Achievements ==
=== BWF International (6 titles, 2 runners-up) ===
Women's singles
Year	Tournament	Opponent	Score	Result
2020	Kenya International	(India) Aakarshi Kashyap	15–21, 6–21	(silver) Runner-up
2021	Uganda International	(India) Malvika Bansod	21–17, 23–25, 10–21	(silver) Runner-up
2021	India International Challenge	(India) Unnati Hooda	21–19, 21–16	(gold) Winner
2022	Polish Open	(India) Aditi Bhatt	17–21, 21–14, 21–17	(gold) Winner
2023	Tajikistan International	(Israel) Ksenia Polikarpova	19–21, 21–9, 21–8	(gold) Winner
2024	Polish Open	(India) Tanya Hemanth	21–15, 11–21, 21–10	(gold) Winner
2024	Kazakhstan International	(India) Isharani Baruah	21–15, 21–16	(gold) Winner
2026	Uganda International	(India) Mansi Singh	21–17, 21–10	(gold) Winner

BWF International Challenge tournament
BWF International Series tournament
BWF Future Series tournament

=== BWF Junior International (1 title) ===
Girls' singles
Year	Tournament	Opponent	Score	Result
2022	Uganda Junior International	(India) Meghana Reddy	21–10, 12–21, 21–17	(gold) Winner

BWF Junior International Grand Prix tournament
BWF Junior International Challenge tournament
BWF Junior International Series tournament
BWF Junior Future Series tournament

== Performance timeline ==
Key

W	F	SF	QF	#R	RR	Q#	A	G	S	B	NH	N/A	DNQ

(W) won; (F) finalist; (SF) semi-finalist; (QF) quarter-finalist; (#R) rounds 4, 3, 2, 1; (RR) round-robin stage; (Q#) qualification round; (A) absent; (G) gold, (S) silver or (B) bronze medal; (NH) not held; (N/A) not applicable; (DNQ) did not qualify.
To avoid confusion and double counting, these charts are updated at the conclusion of a tournament or when the player's participation has ended.

=== National team ===
- Junior level

Team events	2022
World Junior Championships	13th

- Senior level

Team events	2022	2023	2024	2025
Asian Games	QF	NH		
Sudirman Cup	NH	RR	NH	RR

=== Individual competitions ===
- Junior level

Team events	2022
World Junior Championships	3R

- Senior level

Events	2025
Asia Championships	1R

Tournament	BWF World Tour					Best
Tournament	2022	2023	2024	2025	2026	Best
Malaysia Open	A			1R	A	1R ('25)
India Open	2R	A		2R	A	2R ('22, '25)
Indonesia Masters	A			1R	A	1R ('25)
Thailand Masters	NH	1R	A		1R	1R ('23, '26)
German Open	A			1R		1R ('25)
Orléans Masters	QF	Q2	2R	A		QF ('22)
Swiss Open	A			2R		2R ('25)
Taipei Open	A		1R	1R		1R ('24, '25)
Thailand Open	Q1	A		1R		1R ('25)
Singapore Open	A			1R		1R ('25)
Indonesia Open	A			1R		1R ('25)
Canada Open	A		2R	A		2R ('24)
Japan Open	A			2R		2R ('25)
China Open	A			1R		1R ('25)
Macau Open	NH		1R	1R		1R ('24, '25)
Vietnam Open	1R	A	1R	A		1R ('22, '24)
Hong Kong Open	NH	A		1R		1R ('25)
China Masters	NH	A	2R	A		2R ('24)
Indonesia Masters Super 100	A	1R	A			1R ('23)
Indonesia Masters Super 100	A	A				1R ('23)
Korea Open	A			1R		1R ('25)
Kaohsiung Masters	NH	A	1R	A		1R ('24)
Al Ain Masters	NH	A	NH	QF		QF ('25)
French Open	A			1R		1R ('25)
Hylo Open	A			1R		1R ('25)
Australian Open	A		2R	A		2R ('24)
Syed Modi International	SF	2R	2R	2R		SF ('22)
Guwahati Masters	NH	2R	A	QF		QF ('25)
Odisha Masters	2R	QF	1R	QF		QF ('23, '25)
Year-end ranking	48	87	46	48		38
Tournament	2022	2023	2024	2025	2026	Best

== See also ==
- Badminton in India
- India national badminton team
