= Cai Yanyan =

Chinese badminton player (born 1999)

Cai Yanyan 蔡炎炎
Personal information
- Born: 15 November 1999 (age 26) Beijing, China
- Height: 1.71 m (5 ft 7 in)

Sport
- Country: China
- Sport: Badminton
- Handedness: Right

Women's singles
- Highest ranking: 14 (30 April 2019)
- Current ranking: 70 (21 October 2025)
- BWF profile
Medal record
Women's badminton
Representing China
Asian Games
Silver medal – second place	2018 Jakarta–Palembang	Women's team
Asian Championships
Bronze medal – third place	2019 Wuhan	Women's singles
Asia Mixed Team Championships
Gold medal – first place	2019 Hong Kong	Mixed team
Gold medal – first place	2023 Dubai	Mixed team
World Junior Championships
Gold medal – first place	2016 Bilbao	Mixed team
Gold medal – first place	2017 Yogyakarta	Mixed team
Bronze medal – third place	2017 Yogyakarta	Girls' singles
Asian Junior Championships
Gold medal – first place	2016 Bangkok	Mixed team

Cai Yanyan (Chinese: 蔡炎炎, born 15 November 1999) is a Chinese badminton player. She won her first international title at the 2017 China International. She was the bronze medalist at the 2017 World Junior Championships and the 2019 Asian Championships. In 2023, she helped win Asia Mixed Team Championships.

== Achievements ==
=== Asian Championships ===
Women's singles
Year	Venue	Opponent	Score	Result
2019	Wuhan Sports Center Gymnasium, Wuhan, China	(China) He Bingjiao	21–8, 12–21, 17–21	Bronze

=== BWF World Junior Championships ===
Girls' singles
Year	Venue	Opponent	Score	Result
2017	GOR Among Rogo, Yogyakarta, Indonesia	(Indonesia) Gregoria Mariska Tunjung	20–22, 21–13, 18–21	Bronze

=== BWF World Tour (5 titles) ===
The BWF World Tour, which was announced on 19 March 2017 and implemented in 2018, is a series of elite badminton tournaments sanctioned by the Badminton World Federation (BWF). The BWF World Tour is divided into levels of World Tour Finals, Super 1000, Super 750, Super 500, Super 300 (part of the HSBC World Tour), and the BWF Tour Super 100.

Women's singles
Year	Tournament	Level	Opponent	Score	Result
2018	Australian Open	Super 300	(Japan) Ayumi Mine	21–14, 21–13	(gold) Winner
2018	SaarLorLux Open	Super 100	(China) Chen Xiaoxin	21–19, 19–21, 21–17	(gold) Winner
2024	Guwahati Masters	Super 100	(India) Anmol Kharb	14–21, 21–13, 21–19	(gold) Winner
2024	Odisha Masters	Super 100	(India) Tanvi Sharma	21–14, 21–16	(gold) Winner
2025	Vietnam Open	Super 100	(Vietnam) Nguyễn Thùy Linh	21–17, 23–21	(gold) Winner

=== BWF Grand Prix ===
The BWF Grand Prix had two levels, the Grand Prix and Grand Prix Gold. It was a series of badminton tournaments sanctioned by the Badminton World Federation (BWF) and played between 2007 and 2017.

Women's singles
Year	Tournament	Opponent	Score	Result
2017	Macau Open	(Chinese Taipei) Pai Yu-po	21–15, 17–21, 21–16	(gold) Winner

BWF Grand Prix Gold tournament
BWF Grand Prix tournament

=== BWF International Challenge/Series ===
Women's singles
Year	Tournament	Opponent	Score	Result
2017	China International	(China) Wang Zhiyi	11–9, 10–13, 11–9, 11–7	(gold) Winner

BWF International Challenge tournament
BWF International Series tournament
