= Sai Pratheek K. =

Indian badminton player (born 2000)

Personal information
- Nickname: SPK
- Born: Sai Pratheek Krishnaprasad; 3 May 2000 (age 26) Bangalore, Karnataka, India
- Height: 1.80 m (5 ft 11 in)

Sport
- Country: India
- Sport: Badminton
- Handedness: Right
- Coached by: Pullela Gopichand

Men's & mixed doubles
- Highest ranking: 34 (MD with Pruthvi Roy, 22 July 2025); 67 (XD with Tanisha Crasto, 17 October 2023)
- Current ranking: 49 (MD with Pruthvi Roy, 19 May 2026)
- BWF profile
Medal record
Men's badminton
Representing India
Asian Games
Silver medal – second place	2022 Hangzhou	Men's team

Sai Pratheek Krishnaprasad (born 3 May 2000) is an Indian badminton player. He was a member of the team that won silver medal in the men's team event at the 2022 Asian Games.

== Achievements ==
=== BWF World Tour (3 runners-up) ===
The BWF World Tour, which was announced on 19 March 2017 and implemented in 2018, is a series of elite badminton tournaments sanctioned by the Badminton World Federation (BWF). The BWF World Tours are divided into levels of World Tour Finals, Super 1000, Super 750, Super 500, Super 300, and the BWF Tour Super 100.

Men's doubles
Year	Tournament	Level	Partner	Opponent	Score	Result
2023	Odisha Masters	Super 100	(India) Krishna Prasad Garaga	(Chinese Taipei) Lin Bing-wei (Chinese Taipei) Su Ching-heng	22–20, 18–21, 17–21	(silver) Runner-up
2024	Syed Modi International	Super 300	(India) Pruthvi Roy	(China) Huang Di (China) Liu Yang	14–21, 21–19, 17–21	(silver) Runner-up
2025	Guwahati Masters	Super 100	(India) Pruthvi Roy	(Malaysia) Kang Khai Xing (Malaysia) Aaron Tai	13–21, 18–21	(silver) Runner-up

=== BWF International Challenge/Series (7 titles, 8 runners-up) ===
Men's doubles
Year	Tournament	Partner	Opponent	Score	Result
2021	Ukraine International	(India) Ishaan Bhatnagar	(Malaysia) Junaidi Arif (Malaysia) Muhammad Haikal	15–21, 21–19, 15–21	(silver) Runner-up
2021	Polish International	(India) Ishaan Bhatnagar	(England) Rory Easton (England) Zach Russ	21–18, 27–25	(gold) Winner
2022 (II)	India International	(India) Ishaan Bhatnagar	(India) Krishna Prasad Garaga (India) Vishnuvardhan Goud Panjala	17–21, 21–15, 23–21	(gold) Winner
2023	Bahrain International	(India) Krishna Prasad Garaga	(Japan) Kazuki Shibata (Japan) Naoki Yamada	21–16, 17–21, 15–21	(silver) Runner-up
2024	Iran Fajr International	(India) Krishna Prasad Garaga	(Mexico) Job Castillo (Mexico) Luis Montoya	21–18, 21–19	(gold) Winner
2024 (I)	India International	(India) Pruthvi Roy	(India) Arjun M. R. (India) Vishnuvardhan Goud Panjala	21–19, 21–17	(gold) Winner
2026	Uganda International	(India) Pruthvi Roy	(India) Bhargav Arigela (India) Viswatej Gobburu	21–11, 18–21, 19–21	(silver) Runner-up
2026	Jamaica International	(India) Ruban Kumar	(United States) Srinivas Subash (United States) Joshua Yang	Walkover	(gold) Winner
2026	Cameroon International	(India) Ruban Kumar	(Thailand) Thanawin Madee (Thailand) Pongsakorn Thongkham	19–21, 21–15, 16–21	(silver) Runner-up
2026 (I)	India International	(India) Ruban Kumar	(Malaysia) Lau Yi Sheng (Malaysia) Lee Yi Bo	21–15, 21–19	(gold) Winner
2026 (II)	India International	(India) Ruban Kumar	(India) Krishna Prasad Garaga (India) Pruthvi Roy	12–21, 18–21	(silver) Runner-up

Mixed doubles
Year	Tournament	Partner	Opponent	Score	Result
2019	Maldives International	(India) Ashwini Bhat	(Thailand) Chaloempon Charoenkitamorn (Thailand) Chasinee Korepap	11–21, 15–21	(silver) Runner-up
2021	India International	(India) Gayatri Gopichand	(India) Ishaan Bhatnagar (India) Tanisha Crasto	16–21, 19–21	(silver) Runner-up
2022 (III)	India International	(India) Ashwini Ponnappa	(India) Rohan Kapoor (India) N. Sikki Reddy	21–16, 11–21, 21–18	(gold) Winner
2023	Nantes International	(India) Tanisha Crasto	(Denmark) Mads Vestergaard (Denmark) Christine Busch	21–14, 14–21, 17–21	(silver) Runner-up

BWF International Challenge tournament
BWF International Series tournament
BWF Future Series tournament
