= Rithvik Sanjeevi =

Indian badminton player (born 2003)

Personal information
- Born: Rithvik Sanjeevi Satish Kumar; 15 May 2003 (age 23) Tamil Nadu, India

Sport
- Country: India
- Sport: Badminton
- Handedness: Right

Men's singles
- Career record: 88 wins, 51 losses
- Highest ranking: 55 (2 September 2025)
- Current ranking: 72 (18 August 2026)
- BWF profile

Rithvik Sanjeevi Satish Kumar (born 15 May 2003) is an Indian badminton player. He has won the men's singles title at the 2024 Odisha Masters.

== Achievements ==
=== BWF World Tour (1 title) ===
The BWF World Tour was announced on 19 March 2017 and implemented in 2018. It is a series of elite badminton tournaments sanctioned by the Badminton World Federation. The BWF World Tour is divided into levels of World Tour Finals, Super 1000, Super 750, Super 500, Super 300 (part of the HSBC World Tour), and the BWF Tour Super 100.

Men's singles
Year	Tournament	Level	Opponent	Score	Result	Ref.
2024	Odisha Masters	Super 100	(India) Tharun Mannepalli	21–18, 21–16	(gold) Winner	

=== BWF International Challenge/Series (3 titles, 2 runners-up) ===
Men's singles
Year	Tournament	Opponent	Score	Result
2021	Bangladesh International	(India) Abhishek Saini	15–21, 18–21	(silver) Runner-up
2024	Sri Lanka International	(India) Kartikey Kumar	17–21, 18–21	(silver) Runner-up
2024 (I)	India International	(India) Tarun Reddy Katam	21–11, 21–14	(gold) Winner
2025 (I)	India International	(India) Rounak Chouhan	14–21, 21–19, 21–19	(gold) Winner
2026	Valence Alpes International	(Croatia) Aria Dinata	17–21, 23–21, 21–16	(gold) Winner

BWF International Challenge tournament
BWF International Series tournament
BWF Future Series tournament

== Awards and nominations ==
Year	Award	Category	Result	Ref
2025	Times of India Sports Awards	Badminton Player of the Year Male	Nominated	
