= Sathish Karunakaran =

Indian badminton player (born 2001)

Personal information
- Full name: Sathish Kumar Karunakaran
- Born: 20 May 2001 (age 25) Chennai, Tamil Nadu, India

Sport
- Country: India
- Sport: Badminton
- Handedness: Right

Men's singles & mixed doubles
- Highest ranking: 42 (MS, 10 December 2024); 30 (XD with Aadya Variyath, 1 April 2025)
- Current ranking: 123 (MS); 92 (XD with Aadya Variyath) (19 May 2026)
- BWF profile
Medal record
Women's badminton
Representing India
World University Games
Bronze medal – third place	2025 Rhine-Ruhr	Mixed team

Sathish Kumar Karunakaran (born 20 May 2001) is an Indian badminton player.

== Achievements ==
=== BWF World Tour (2 titles) ===
The BWF World Tour, which was announced on 19 March 2017 and implemented in 2018, is a series of elite badminton tournaments sanctioned by the Badminton World Federation (BWF). The BWF World Tour is divided into levels of World Tour Finals, Super 1000, Super 750, Super 500, Super 300, and the BWF Tour Super 100.

Men's singles
Year	Tournament	Level	Opponent	Score	Result
2023	Odisha Masters	Super 100	(India) Ayush Shetty	21–18, 19–21, 21–14	(gold) Winner
2024	Guwahati Masters	Super 100	(China) Zhu Xuanchen	21–17, 21–14	(gold) Winner

=== BWF International Challenge / Series (11 titles, 9 runners–up) ===
Men's singles
Year	Tournament	Opponent	Score	Result
2021	Ukraine International	(India) Priyanshu Rajawat	17–21, 18–21	(silver) Runner-up
2021	Hungarian International	(Bulgaria) Daniel Nikolov	17–21, 18–21	(silver) Runner-up
2022	Cameroon International	(Malaysia) Chua Kim Sheng	21–13, 21–13	(gold) Winner
2023	Maldives International	(Indonesia) Krishna Adi Nugraha	12–21, 11–21	(silver) Runner-up
2023 (I)	India International	(India) Ravi	21–14, 21–16	(gold) Winner
2023 (II)	India International	(India) Ravi	24–22, 21–7	(gold) Winner
2024	Iran Fajr International	(Vietnam) Nguyễn Hải Đăng	17–21, 18–21	(silver) Runner-up
2026	Slovenia Open	(Malaysia) Tan Kean Wei	21–17, 21–14	(gold) Winner
2026 (I)	India International	(India) Tankara Gnana Dattu Talasila	21–9, 23–21	(gold) Winner

Mixed doubles
Year	Tournament	Partner	Opponent	Score	Result
2022	Cameroon International	(India) Aadya Variyath	(Philippines) Alvin Morada (Philippines) Alyssa Leonardo	19–21, 21–18, 20–22	(silver) Runner-up
2023	Maldives International	(India) Aadya Variyath	(Malaysia) Loo Bing Kun (Malaysia) Cheng Su Yin	21–19, 16–21, 21–16	(gold) Winner
2023	Malaysia International	(India) Aadya Variyath	(Malaysia) Loo Bing Kun (Malaysia) Cheng Su Yin	18–21, 14–21	(silver) Runner-up
2023 (I)	India International	(India) Aadya Variyath	(Thailand) Phatharathorn Nipornram (Thailand) Nattamon Laisuan	23–21, 17–21, 20–22	(silver) Runner-up
2023 (II)	India International	(India) Aadya Variyath	(India) Dingku Singh Konthoujam (India) Priya Konjengbam	21–10, 21–18	(gold) Winner
2024	Iran Fajr International	(India) Aadya Variyath	(India) B. Sumeeth Reddy (India) N. Sikki Reddy	22–20, 21–14	(gold) Winner
2024	Azerbaijan International	(India) Aadya Variyath	(India) B. Sumeeth Reddy (India) N. Sikki Reddy	13–21, 22–20, 21–10	(gold) Winner
2024	Uganda International	(India) Aadya Variyath	(Australia) Kenneth Choo (Australia) Gronya Somerville	22–20, 18–21, 21–19	(gold) Winner
2026	Slovenia Open	(India) Zenith Abbigail	(Malaysia) Ahmad Redzuan (Malaysia) Teh Si Yan	21–19, 21–15	(gold) Winner
2026	Austrian Open	(India) Zenith Abbigail	(Germany) Jan Colin Völker (Germany) Emma Moszczynski	21–19, 13–21, 20–22	(silver) Runner-up
2026 (II)	India International	(India) Ashwini Ponnappa	(Individual Neutral Athletes) Rodion Alimov (Individual Neutral Athletes) Alina Davletova	21–19, 11–21, 13–21	(silver) Runner-up

BWF International Challenge tournament
BWF International Series tournament
BWF Future Series tournament
