= Odisha Masters =

Annual badminton tournament in India

- Official website
- Founded: 2022; 4 years ago
- Editions: 4
- Location: Cuttack; India
- Venue: Jawaharlal Nehru Indoor Stadium (2025)
- Prize money: US$110,000 (2025)

Men's
- Draw: 48S / 32D
- Current champions: Kiran George (singles); Ali Faathir Rayhan; Devin Artha Wahyudi (doubles)
- Most singles titles: 2 Kiran George
- Most doubles titles: 1, all winners

Women's
- Draw: 32S / 32D
- Current champions: Unnati Hooda (singles); Gabriela Stoeva; Stefani Stoeva (doubles)
- Most singles titles: 2 Unnati Hooda
- Most doubles titles: 1, all winners

Mixed doubles
- Draw: 32
- Current champions: Marwan Faza; Aisyah Pranata
- Most titles (male): 1, all winners
- Most titles (female): 1, all winners

Super 100
- Al Ain Masters; Akita Masters (2018–2019); Baoji China Masters; Dutch Open (2018–2019); Hyderabad Open (2018–2019); Indonesia Masters Super 100; Kaohsiung Masters; Malaysia Super 100; Guwahati Masters; Odisha Masters; Ruichang China Masters; Russian Open (2018–2019); Scottish Open (2018); Vietnam Open

Ongoing
- 2025 Odisha Masters

The Odisha Masters, formerly known as the Odisha Open, is an annual badminton tournament held in India. It is part of the BWF World Tour tournaments and is leveled in BWF Tour Super 100. The inaugural edition took place in 2022 at the Jawaharlal Nehru Indoor Stadium in Cuttack, Odisha.

== Locations ==
Below is the cities that have hosted the tournament.

- Cuttack: 2022–2026
Locations of Odisha Masters host cities

== Winners ==
Year	Men's singles	Women's singles	Men's doubles	Women's doubles	Mixed doubles	Ref
2022	(India) Kiran George	(India) Unnati Hooda	(Malaysia) Nur Mohd Azriyn Ayub (Malaysia) Lim Khim Wah	(India) Gayatri Gopichand (India) Treesa Jolly	(Sri Lanka) Sachin Dias (Sri Lanka) Thilini Hendahewa	
2023	(India) Sathish Karunakaran	(Japan) Nozomi Okuhara	(Chinese Taipei) Lin Bing-wei (Chinese Taipei) Su Ching-heng	(Indonesia) Meilysa Trias Puspita Sari (Indonesia) Rachel Allessya Rose	(India) Dhruv Kapila (India) Tanisha Crasto	
2024	(India) Rithvik Sanjeevi	(China) Cai Yanyan	(China) Huang Di (China) Liu Yang	(Japan) Nanako Hara (Japan) Riko Kiyose	(China) Gao Jiaxuan (China) Tang Ruizhi	
2025	(India) Kiran George	(India) Unnati Hooda	(Indonesia) Ali Faathir Rayhan (Indonesia) Devin Artha Wahyudi	(Bulgaria) Gabriela Stoeva (Bulgaria) Stefani Stoeva	(Indonesia) Marwan Faza (Indonesia) Aisyah Pranata	

== Performance by nations ==
As of the 2025 edition

Pos.	Nation	MS	WS	MD	WD	XD	Total
1	India	4	2		1	1	8
2	China		1	1		1	3
2	Indonesia			1	1	1	3
4	Japan		1		1		2
5	Bulgaria				1		1
5	Chinese Taipei			1			1
5	Malaysia			1			1
5	Sri Lanka					1	1
Total		4	4	4	4	4	20

== See also ==
- India Open
- Syed Modi International Badminton Championships
- Guwahati Masters
- Hyderabad Open (Defunct)
- India International Challenge
