= Tharun Mannepalli =

Indian badminton player (born 2001)

Sport
- Sport: Badminton
- Event: Men's singles

Men's singles
- BWF profile
Medal record
Men's badminton
Representing India
Asian Games
| Bronze medal – third place | 2026 Aichi–Nagoya | Men's team |

Tharun Mannepalli (born 24 August 2001) is an Indian badminton player from Telangana. He represented Indian and was part of the badminton team that claimed the bronze medal at the 2026 Asian Games in Japan.

== Early life ==
Tharun is from Khammam, but later moved to Hyderabad after Class 10 to develop his game.

== Career ==
In August 2025, Tharun defeated the top seed top seed Lee Cheuk Yiu at the Macau Open, a super 300 event, and later followed it up with a win against the then junior World Champion Hu Zhe An from China, to reach the semifinal. He lost the semifinal to Justin Hoh of Malaysia in three games 21–19, 16–21, 16–21. In October 2025, Tharun, ranked 46th, defeated world No.14 Toma Junior Popov of France at the Arctic Open in Vantaa, Finland. In March 2026, he took part in the Swiss Open.
