= Guwahati Masters =

Annual badminton tournament in India

- Official website
- Founded: 2023; 3 years ago
- Editions: 3 (2025)
- Location: Guwahati; India
- Venue: Sarju Sarai Indoor Sports Complex
- Prize money: US$110,000 (2025)

Men's
- Draw: 48S / 32D
- Current champions: Sanskar Saraswat (singles); Kang Khai Xing; Aaron Tai (doubles)
- Most singles titles: 1, all winners
- Most doubles titles: 1, all winners

Women's
- Draw: 32S / 32D
- Current champions: Tung Ciou-tong (singles); Isyana Syahira Meida; Rinjani Kwinnara Nastine (doubles)
- Most singles titles: 1, all winners
- Most doubles titles: 2 Tanisha Crasto; Ashwini Ponnappa

Mixed doubles
- Draw: 32
- Current champions: Marwan Faza; Aisyah Pranata
- Most titles (male): 1, all winners
- Most titles (female): 1, all winners

Super 100
- Al Ain Masters; Akita Masters (2018–2019); Baoji China Masters; Dutch Open (2018–2019); Hyderabad Open (2018–2019); Indonesia Masters Super 100; Kaohsiung Masters; Malaysia Super 100; Guwahati Masters; Odisha Masters; Ruichang China Masters; Russian Open (2018–2019); Scottish Open (2018); Vietnam Open

Last completed
- 2025 Guwahati Masters

The Guwahati Masters is an annual badminton tournament held in India. The tournament is a part of the BWF World Tour tournaments and is leveled in BWF Tour Super 100. The inaugural edition was held in 2023 at the Saru Sajai Indoor Sports Complex in Guwahati, Assam.

== Locations ==
Below is the cities that have hosted the tournament.

- Guwahati: 2023–2026
Locations of Guwahati Masters host cities

== Winners ==
Year	Men's singles	Women's singles	Men's doubles	Women's doubles	Mixed doubles	Ref
2023	(Indonesia) Yohanes Saut Marcellyno	(Thailand) Lalinrat Chaiwan	(Malaysia) Choong Hon Jian (Malaysia) Muhammad Haikal	(India) Tanisha Crasto (India) Ashwini Ponnappa	(Singapore) Terry Hee (Singapore) Jessica Tan	
2024	(India) Sathish Karunakaran	(China) Cai Yanyan	(Malaysia) Chia Wei Jie (Malaysia) Lwi Sheng Hao	(India) Tanisha Crasto (India) Ashwini Ponnappa	(China) Zhang Hanyu (China) Bao Lijing	
2025	(India) Sanskar Saraswat	(Chinese Taipei) Tung Ciou-tong	(Malaysia) Kang Khai Xing (Malaysia) Aaron Tai	(Indonesia) Isyana Syahira Meida (Indonesia) Rinjani Kwinnara Nastine	(Indonesia) Marwan Faza (Indonesia) Aisyah Pranata	

== Performance by nations ==
As of the 2025 edition

Pos.	Nation	MS	WS	MD	WD	XD	Total
1	India	2			2		4
2	Indonesia	1			1	1	3
2	Malaysia			3			3
4	China		1			1	2
5	Chinese Taipei		1				1
5	Singapore					1	1
5	Thailand		1				1
Total		3	3	3	3	3	15

== See also ==
- India Open
- Syed Modi International Badminton Championships
- Hyderabad Open (Defunct)
- Odisha Masters
- India International Challenge
