= 2022 BWF Continental Circuit =

Tournament details
- Dates: 11 January – 18 December
- Edition: 16th

The 2022 BWF Continental Circuit was the sixteenth season of the BWF Continental Circuit of badminton, a circuit of 70 tournaments. The 70 tournaments were divided into three levels:

- International Challenge (28 tournaments)
- International Series (24 tournaments)
- Future Series (18 tournaments).

Each of these tournaments offered different ranking points and prize money.

== Points distribution ==
Below is the point distribution table for each phase of the tournament based on the BWF points system for the BWF Continental Circuit events.

Tournament	Winner	Runner-up	3/4	5/8	9/16	17/32	33/64	65/128	129/256
International Challenge	4,000	3,400	2,800	2,200	1,520	920	360	170	70
International Series	2,500	2,130	1,750	1,370	920	550	210	100	40
Future Series	1,700	1,420	1,170	920	600	350	130	60	20

== Results ==
Below is the schedule released by Badminton World Federation:

=== Winners ===
==== International Challenge ====
Tour	Men's singles	Women's singles	Men's doubles	Women's doubles	Mixed doubles
Ukraine Open	(France) Christo Popov	(Turkey) Aliye Demirbağ	(Malaysia) Chia Wei Jie (Malaysia) Low Hang Yee	(Germany) Stine Küspert (Germany) Emma Moszczynski	(Germany) Jones Ralfy Jansen (Germany) Linda Efler
Iran Fajr International	(India) Meiraba Luwang Maisnam	(India) Tasnim Mir	(Indonesia) Abiyyu Fauzan Majid (Indonesia) Ferdian Mahardika Ranialdy	(Russia) Ekaterina Malkova (Russia) Anastasiia Shapovalova	—N/a
Uganda International	(France) Arnaud Merklé	(Canada) Talia Ng	(Malaysia) Boon Xin Yuan (Malaysia) Wong Tien Ci	(Malaysia) Kasturi Radhakrishnan (Malaysia) Venosha Radhakrishnan	(Algeria) Koceila Mammeri (Algeria) Tanina Mammeri
Polish Open	(India) Kiran George	(India) Anupama Upadhyaya	(Denmark) Rasmus Kjær (Denmark) Frederik Søgaard	(Hong Kong) Yeung Nga Ting (Hong Kong) Yeung Pui Lam	(Chinese Taipei) Ye Hong-wei (Chinese Taipei) Lee Chia-hsin
Vietnam International	Cancelled (Note: This tournament, originally to be played on 22–27 March, was later cancelled due to the COVID-19 pandemic in Vietnam.)				
Osaka International	Cancelled				
Mexican International	(Japan) Minoru Koga	(Japan) Riko Gunji	(Japan) Shuntaro Mezaki (Japan) Haruya Nishida	(Japan) Rui Hirokami (Japan) Yuna Kato	(Japan) Naoki Yamada (Japan) Moe Ikeuchi
Italian International	(Indonesia) Christian Adinata	(Chinese Taipei) Hsu Wen-chi	(South Korea) Kim Jae-hwan (South Korea) Yoon Dae-il	(Chinese Taipei) Hsu Ya-ching (Chinese Taipei) Lin Wan-ching	(Indonesia) Zachariah Josiahno Sumanti (Indonesia) Hediana Julimarbela
Denmark Masters	(Chinese Taipei) Lu Chia-hung	(Thailand) Pitchamon Opatniput	(South Korea) Jin Yong (South Korea) Na Sung-seung	(Hong Kong) Yeung Nga Ting (Hong Kong) Yeung Pui Lam	(Indonesia) Dejan Ferdinansyah (Indonesia) Gloria Emanuelle Widjaja
Nantes International	(Denmark) Mads Christophersen	(Chinese Taipei) Hsu Wen-chi	(Chinese Taipei) Su Ching-heng (Chinese Taipei) Ye Hong-wei	(Denmark) Julie Finne-Ipsen (Denmark) Mai Surrow	(Indonesia) Amri Syahnawi (Indonesia) Winny Oktavina Kandow
White Nights	Cancelled (Note: This tournament, originally to be played on 6–10 July, was later cancelled due to the Russian invasion of Ukraine.)				
Réunion Open	(Japan) Riku Hatano	(Japan) Riko Gunji	(Japan) Shuntaro Mezaki (Japan) Haruya Nishida	(Germany) Annabella Jäger (Germany) Leona Michalski	(Japan) Sumiya Nihei (Japan) Minami Asakura
Mongolia International	(Chinese Taipei) Lin Chun-yi	(Indonesia) Sri Fatmawati	(Japan) Ayato Endo (Japan) Yuta Takei	(South Korea) Seong Seung-yeon (South Korea) Yoon Min-ah	(South Korea) Choi Hyun-beom (South Korea) Yoon Min-ah
Lagos International	Cancelled				
Belgian International	(Chinese Taipei) Lin Chun-yi	(Vietnam) Nguyễn Thùy Linh	(Chinese Taipei) Chang Ko-chi (Chinese Taipei) Po Li-wei	(Japan) Rui Hirokami (Japan) Yuna Kato	(Japan) Hiroki Midorikawa (Japan) Natsu Saito
India Maharashtra International	(India) Meiraba Luwang Maisnam	(Japan) Miho Kayama	(India) Arjun M. R. (India) Dhruv Kapila	(Japan) Chisato Hoshi (Japan) Miyu Takahashi	(Thailand) Ruttanapak Oupthong (Thailand) Jhenicha Sudjaipraparat
India Chhattisgarh International	(India) Priyanshu Rajawat	(India) Tasnim Mir	(India) Ishaan Bhatnagar (India) Sai Pratheek K.	(Japan) Chisato Hoshi (Japan) Miyu Takahashi	(India) Rohan Kapoor (India) N. Sikki Reddy
Finnish Open	Cancelled (Note: This tournament, originally to be played on 28 September to 1 October, was later cancelled due to the COVID-19 pandemic in Finland.)				
Indonesia International	(Chinese Taipei) Lin Kuan-ting	(Indonesia) Ester Nurumi Tri Wardoyo	(Japan) Takumi Nomura (Japan) Yuichi Shimogami	(Indonesia) Anggia Shitta Awanda (Indonesia) Putri Larasati	(Indonesia) Akbar Bintang Cahyono (Indonesia) Marsheilla Gischa Islami
Malang Indonesia International	(China) Weng Hongyang	(China) Gao Fangjie	(Indonesia) Rahmat Hidayat (Indonesia) Pramudya Kusumawardana	(Indonesia) Lanny Tria Mayasari (Indonesia) Ribka Sugiarto	(Indonesia) Dejan Ferdinansyah (Indonesia) Gloria Emanuelle Widjaja
Bendigo International	(Chinese Taipei) Lin Chun-yi	(Chinese Taipei) Sung Shuo-yun	(Chinese Taipei) Chang Ko-chi (Chinese Taipei) Po Li-wei	(Chinese Taipei) Lee Chia-hsin (Chinese Taipei) Teng Chun-hsun	(Chinese Taipei) Chang Ko-chi (Chinese Taipei) Lee Chih-chen
India International Challenge	(India) Sourabh Verma	(India) Tanya Hemanth	(Thailand) Chaloempon Charoenkitamorn (Thailand) Nanthakarn Yordphaisong	(India) Ashwini Bhat K. (India) Shikha Gautam	(India) Sai Pratheek K. (India) Ashwini Ponnappa
Dutch Open	(France) Christo Popov	(Chinese Taipei) Hsu Wen-chi	(Chinese Taipei) Chiu Hsiang-chieh (Chinese Taipei) Yang Ming-tse	(Netherlands) Debora Jille (Netherlands) Cheryl Seinen	(Netherlands) Robin Tabeling (Netherlands) Selena Piek
North Harbour International	(Japan) Yushi Tanaka	(Japan) Shiori Saito	(Chinese Taipei) Chang Ko-chi (Chinese Taipei) Po Li-wei	(Chinese Taipei) Sung Shuo-yun (Chinese Taipei) Yu Chien-hui	(Chinese Taipei) Chang Ko-chi (Chinese Taipei) Lee Chih-chen
Maldives International	(Spain) Luís Enrique Peñalver	(India) Aakarshi Kashyap	(India) Rohan Kapoor (India) B. Sumeeth Reddy	(Japan) Chisato Hoshi (Japan) Miyu Takahashi	(India) Rohan Kapoor (India) N. Sikki Reddy
Pakistan International	Cancelled (Note: This tournament, originally to be played on 25–30 October, was later cancelled due to the COVID-19 pandemic in Pakistan.)				
Jakarta Indonesia International	Cancelled (Note: This tournament, originally to be played on 15–20 November, was later cancelled due to the COVID-19 pandemic in Indonesia.)				
Peru Challenge	(Canada) Jason Ho-Shue	(Japan) Kaoru Sugiyama	(Canada) Jason Ho-Shue (Canada) Joshua Hurlburt-Yu	(United States) Paula Lynn Cao Hok (United States) Lauren Lam	(United States) Vinson Chiu (United States) Jennie Gai
Irish Open	(Denmark) Magnus Johannesen	(Japan) Riko Gunji	(Japan) Ayato Endo (Japan) Yuta Takei	(Chinese Taipei) Chang Ching-hui (Chinese Taipei) Yang Ching-tun	(England) Gregory Mairs (England) Jenny Moore
Welsh International	(Denmark) Mads Christophersen	(Germany) Yvonne Li	(Denmark) Rasmus Kjær (Denmark) Frederik Søgaard	(France) Margot Lambert (France) Anne Tran	(Denmark) Jesper Toft (Denmark) Clara Graversen
Bahrain International Challenge	(Malaysia) Ng Tze Yong	(Thailand) Pitchamon Opatniput	(Indonesia) Rayhan Fadillah (Indonesia) Rahmat Hidayat	(Indonesia) Lanny Tria Mayasari (Indonesia) Ribka Sugiarto	(Thailand) Ruttanapak Oupthong (Thailand) Jhenicha Sudjaipraparat
Bangladesh International	(India) Mithun Manjunath	(India) Aakarshi Kashyap	(Thailand) Pharanyu Kaosamaang (Thailand) Worrapol Thongsa-Nga	(Thailand) Laksika Kanlaha (Thailand) Phataimas Muenwong	(Malaysia) Chen Tang Jie (Malaysia) Toh Ee Wei
Canadian International	(Japan) Takuma Obayashi	(Canada) Michelle Li	(Denmark) Rasmus Kjær (Denmark) Frederik Søgaard	(United States) Annie Xu (United States) Kerry Xu	(Denmark) Mathias Thyrri (Denmark) Amalie Magelund
Malaysia International	(Malaysia) Justin Hoh	(Indonesia) Yulia Yosephine Susanto	(Malaysia) Muhammad Haikal (Malaysia) Nur Izzuddin	(Singapore) Jin Yujia (Singapore) Crystal Wong	(Malaysia) Hoo Pang Ron (Malaysia) Teoh Mei Xing

==== International Series ====
Tour	Men's singles	Women's singles	Men's doubles	Women's doubles	Mixed doubles
Estonian International	(France) Alex Lanier	(Estonia) Kristin Kuuba	(Thailand) Ruttanapak Oupthong (Thailand) Sirawit Sothon	(Thailand) Chasinee Korepap (Thailand) Jhenicha Sudjaipraparat	(Thailand) Ratchapol Makkasasithorn (Thailand) Jhenicha Sudjaipraparat
Swedish Open	(Malaysia) Kok Jing Hong	(Thailand) Pitchamon Opatniput	(Singapore) Danny Bawa Chrisnanta (Singapore) Andy Kwek	(Thailand) Chasinee Korepap (Thailand) Jhenicha Sudjaipraparat	(Finland) Anton Kaisti (Czech Republic) Alžběta Bášová
Portugal International	(Indonesia) Andi Fadel Muhammad	(Chinese Taipei) Hsu Wen-chi	(Chinese Taipei) Su Ching-heng (Chinese Taipei) Ye Hong-wei	(Hong Kong) Yeung Nga Ting (Hong Kong) Yeung Pui Lam	(Chinese Taipei) Ye Hong-wei (Chinese Taipei) Lee Chia-hsin
Dutch International	(Denmark) Magnus Johannesen	(Malaysia) Myisha Mohd Khairul	(Denmark) Rasmus Kjær (Denmark) Frederik Søgaard	(Hong Kong) Ng Tsz Yau (Hong Kong) Tsang Hiu Yan	(Hong Kong) Lee Chun Hei (Hong Kong) Ng Tsz Yau
Luxembourg Open	(Denmark) Mads Christophersen	(Indonesia) Chiara Marvella Handoyo	(Denmark) Andreas Søndergaard (Denmark) Jesper Toft	(England) Abbygael Harris (England) Hope Warner	(France) Lucas Corvée (France) Sharone Bauer
Slovenian International	(Austria) Collins Valentine Filimon	(Chinese Taipei) Lin Hsiang-ti	(Chinese Taipei) Wei Chun-wei (Chinese Taipei) Wu Guan-xun	(Indonesia) Meilysa Trias Puspita Sari (Indonesia) Rachel Allessya Rose	(Denmark) Kristian Kræmer (Denmark) Amalie Cecilie Kudsk
Austrian Open	(Malaysia) Yeoh Seng Zoe	(Chinese Taipei) Hsu Wen-chi	(Chinese Taipei) Lin Yu-chieh (Chinese Taipei) Su Li-wei	(Chinese Taipei) Lee Chia-hsin (Chinese Taipei) Teng Chun-hsun	(Chinese Taipei) Ye Hong-wei (Chinese Taipei) Lee Chia-hsin
Santo Domingo Open	(Israel) Misha Zilberman	(Italy) Yasmine Hamza	(Japan) Ayato Endo (Japan) Yuta Takei	(Brazil) Sania Lima (Brazil) Tamires Santos	(Japan) Sumiya Nihei (Japan) Minami Asakura
Cameroon International	(India) Sathish Kumar Karunakaran	(Malaysia) Kasturi Radhakrishnan	(Philippines) Christian Bernardo (Philippines) Alvin Morada	(India) Srivedya Gurazada (India) Poorvisha S. Ram	(Philippines) Alvin Morada (Philippines) Alyssa Leonardo
Ukraine International	Postponed				
Brazil International	(El Salvador) Uriel Canjura	(Brazil) Juliana Viana Vieira	(Brazil) Fabricio Farias (Brazil) Francielton Farias	(Brazil) Jaqueline Lima (Brazil) Sâmia Lima	(Guatemala) Jonathan Solís (Guatemala) Diana Corleto
Indonesia International	(Indonesia) Ikhsan Rumbay	(Indonesia) Mutiara Ayu Puspitasari	(Indonesia) Alfian Eko Prasetya (Indonesia) Ade Yusuf Santoso	(Indonesia) Ririn Amelia (Indonesia) Virni Putri	(Indonesia) Dejan Ferdinansyah (Indonesia) Gloria Emanuelle Widjaja
Polish International	(Japan) Yushi Tanaka	(Japan) Hirari Mizui	(Chinese Taipei) Chiu Hsiang-chieh (Chinese Taipei) Yang Ming-tse	(Japan) Miku Shigeta (Japan) Yui Suizu	(Chinese Taipei) Chiu Hsiang-chieh (Chinese Taipei) Lin Xiao-min
Guatemala International	(Italy) Giovanni Toti	(Bulgaria) Hristomira Popovska	(Guatemala) Jonathan Solís (Guatemala) Aníbal Marroquín	(Canada) Sharon Au (Canada) Jeslyn Chow	(Guatemala) Jonathan Solís (Guatemala) Diana Corleto
Sydney International	(Chinese Taipei) Lin Chun-yi	(Chinese Taipei) Sung Shuo-yun	(Chinese Taipei) Lee Fang-chih (Chinese Taipei) Lee Fang-jen	(Chinese Taipei) Sung Shuo-yun (Chinese Taipei) Yu Chien-hui	(Chinese Taipei) Chen Xin-yuan (Chinese Taipei) Yang Ching-tun
Egypt International	(Germany) Samuel Hsiao	(Hungary) Daniella Gonda	(Thailand) Pharanyu Kaosamaang (Thailand) Worrapol Thongsa-Nga	(Italy) Martina Corsini (Italy) Judith Mair	(Thailand) Ratchapol Makkasasithorn (Thailand) Chasinee Korepap
Czech Open	(Denmark) Victor Svendsen	(Denmark) Amalie Schulz	(Thailand) Pharanyu Kaosamaang (Thailand) Worrapol Thongsa-Nga	(Denmark) Christine Busch (Denmark) Amalie Schulz	(Denmark) Mads Vestergaard (Denmark) Christine Busch
Peru International Series	(Brazil) Jonathan Matias	(Brazil) Juliana Viana Vieira	(Canada) Lam Wai Lok (England) Kern Pong Lap Kan	(Brazil) Jaqueline Lima (Brazil) Sâmia Lima	(Brazil) Fabrício Farias (Brazil) Jaqueline Lima
Pakistan International	Cancelled (Note: This tournament, originally to be played on 1–6 November, was later cancelled due to the COVID-19 pandemic in Pakistan.)				
Vietnam International Series	(China) Liu Liang	(Vietnam) Nguyễn Thùy Linh	(China) Chen Boyang (China) Liu Yi	(China) Li Yijing (China) Luo Xumin	(China) Jiang Zhenbang (China) Wei Yaxin
Hungarian International	(Chinese Taipei) Lee Chia-hao	(Bulgaria) Kaloyana Nalbantova	(Chinese Taipei) Lin Yu-chieh (Chinese Taipei) Su Li-wei	(England) Abbygael Harris (England) Annie Lado	(Netherlands) Brian Wassink (Netherlands) Alyssa Tirtosentono
Norwegian International	(Chinese Taipei) Lin Chun-yi	(Japan) Natsuki Nidaira	(Chinese Taipei) Chen Zhi-ray (Chinese Taipei) Lu Chen	(Chinese Taipei) Chang Ching-hui (Chinese Taipei) Yang Ching-tun	(France) Lucas Corvée (France) Sharone Bauer
Malaysia International	(Indonesia) Syabda Perkasa Belawa	(China) Gao Fangjie	(China) Chen Boyang (China) Liu Yi	(China) Liu Shengshu (China) Tan Ning	(China) Cheng Xing (China) Chen Fanghui
Bahrain International	(Germany) Kai Schäfer	(Chinese Taipei) Wang Yu-si	(Thailand) Tanadon Punpanich (Thailand) Wachirawit Sothon	(Chinese Taipei) Liang Ting-yu (Chinese Taipei) Wu Ti-jung	(England) Gregory Mairs (England) Jenny Moore
Mexican International	(Guatemala) Kevin Cordón	(United States) Lauren Lam	(Czech Republic) Ondřej Král (Czech Republic) Adam Mendrek	(Canada) Catherine Choi (Canada) Josephine Wu	(United States) Vinson Chiu (United States) Jennie Gai
El Salvador International	(El Salvador) Uriel Canjura	(United States) Lauren Lam	(Canada) Kevin Lee (Canada) Ty Alexander Lindeman	(United States) Paula Lynn Cao Hok (United States) Lauren Lam	(Spain) Joan Monroy (Spain) Ania Setien
Manawatu International	Cancelled (Note: This tournament, originally to be played on 1–4 December, was later cancelled due to the COVID-19 pandemic in New Zealand.)				
Turkey Open	Cancelled (Note: This tournament, originally to be played on 19 to 22 December, was later cancelled due to the COVID-19 pandemic in Turkey.)				

==== Future Series ====
Tour	Men's singles	Women's singles	Men's doubles	Women's doubles	Mixed doubles
Iceland International	Cancelled (Note: This tournament, originally to be played on 27–30 January, was later cancelled due to the COVID-19 pandemic in Iceland.)				
Slovak Open	(Japan) Riku Hatano	(India) Aditi Bhatt	(Malaysia) Boon Xin Yuan (Malaysia) Wong Tien Ci	(Chinese Taipei) Lee Chia-hsin (Chinese Taipei) Teng Chun-hsun	(Hong Kong) Yeung Ming Nok (Hong Kong) Yeung Pui Lam
Giraldilla International	Cancelled (Note: Tournament cancelled due to the COVID-19 pandemic in Cuba on 4 March 2022.)				
Dnipro Future Series	Postponed				
Lithuanian International	(Indonesia) Syabda Perkasa Belawa	(Indonesia) Aisyah Sativa Fatetani	(Indonesia) Rayhan Fadillah (Indonesia) Rahmat Hidayat	(Indonesia) Nethania Irawan (Indonesia) Febi Setianingrum	(Indonesia) Amri Syahnawi (Indonesia) Winny Oktavina Kandow
Bonn International	(Malaysia) Justin Hoh	(Indonesia) Stephanie Widjaja	(Chinese Taipei) Chiu Hsiang-chieh (Chinese Taipei) Yang Ming-tse	(Chinese Taipei) Hsu Ya-ching (Chinese Taipei) Lin Wan-ching	(Indonesia) Amri Syahnawi (Indonesia) Winny Oktavina Kandow
Croatia Open	(Malaysia) Justin Hoh	(Vietnam) Vũ Thị Anh Thư	(Singapore) Donovan Willard Wee (Singapore) Howin Wong	(Hong Kong) Lui Lok Lok (Hong Kong) Ng Shiu Yee	(England) Jonty Russ (England) Sian Kelly
Future Series Nouvelle-Aquitaine	(Singapore) Lim Ming Hong	(Vietnam) Vũ Thị Anh Thư	(Thailand) Peeratchai Sukphun (Thailand) Pakkapon Teeraratsakul	(Sweden) Ronak Olyaee (Sweden) Nathalie Wang	(Denmark) Emil Lauritzen (Denmark) Signe Schulz
Latvia International	(Italy) Christopher Vittoriani	(Chinese Taipei) Wang Pei-yu	(Chinese Taipei) Lai Po-yu (Chinese Taipei) Tsai Fu-cheng	(Estonia) Kati-Kreet Marran (Estonia) Helina Rüütel	(Denmark) Emil Lauritzen (Denmark) Signe Schulz
Mexico Future Series	(Mexico) Luis Montoya	(United States) Sanchita Pandey	(England) Kern Pong Lap Kan (England) Larry Pong	(Mexico) Paula Lozoya (Mexico) Fatima Rio	(United States) Ryan Zheng (United States) Sanchita Pandey
Benin International	(Malaysia) Ong Zhen Yi	(Malaysia) Loh Zhi Wei	(Philippines) Christian Bernardo (Philippines) Alvin Morada	(Philippines) Alyssa Leonardo (Philippines) Thea Pomar	(Philippines) Alvin Morada (Philippines) Alyssa Leonardo
Spanish International	(Denmark) Victor Ørding Kauffmann	(Denmark) Laura Fløj Thomsen	(Netherlands) Noah Haase (Bulgaria) Alex Vlaar	(Denmark) Lærke Hvid (Denmark) Emilia Nesic	(England) Jonty Russ (England) Sian Kelly
Venezuela Future Series	Cancelled				
Croatian International	(China) Liu Haichao	(Chinese Taipei) Huang Ching-ping	(Chinese Taipei) Chiu Hsiang-chieh (Chinese Taipei) Yang Ming-tse	(China) Qiao Shijun (China) Zhou Xinru	(Chinese Taipei) Chiu Hsiang-chieh (Chinese Taipei) Lin Xiao-min
Bulgarian International Championship	(Chinese Taipei) Wang Po-wei	(Chinese Taipei) Lin Sih-yun	(Chinese Taipei) Chiang Chien-wei (Chinese Taipei) Wu Hsuan-yi	(Chinese Taipei) Liu Chiao-yun (Chinese Taipei) Wang Yu-qiao	(Chinese Taipei) Chiu Hsiang-chieh (Chinese Taipei) Lin Xiao-min
Cyprus International	Cancelled (Note: This tournament, originally to be played on 13–16 October, was later cancelled due to the COVID-19 pandemic in Cyprus.)				
Dominican Open	Cancelled (Note: Tournament cancelled due to the COVID-19 pandemic in the Dominican Republic on 30 August 2022.)				
Israel Open	(Germany) Matthias Kicklitz	(Switzerland) Dounia Pelupessy	(Italy) Giovanni Greco (Italy) David Salutt	(Switzerland) Aline Müller (Switzerland) Caroline Racloz	(Switzerland) Minh Quang Pham (Switzerland) Caroline Racloz
Guatemala Future Series	(Japan) Yuta Kikuchi	(France) Malya Hoareau	(Guatemala) José Granados (Guatemala) Antonio Ortíz	(Guatemala) Alejandra Paiz (Guatemala) Mariana Paiz	(France) Tino Daoudal (France) Malya Hoareau
Zambia International	(Kazakhstan) Dmitriy Panarin	(Azerbaijan) Keisha Fatimah Azzahra	(South Africa) Jarred Elliott (South Africa) Robert Summers	(Azerbaijan) Keisha Fatimah Azzahra (Azerbaijan) Era Maftuha	(Jordan) Bahaedeen Ahmad Alshannik (Jordan) Domou Amro
Slovenia Future Series	(Indonesia) Andi Fadel Muhammad	(Japan) Tomoka Miyazaki	(Denmark) Rasmus Espersen (Denmark) Kristian Kræmer	(Japan) Hina Akechi (Japan) Sorano Yoshikawa	(Serbia) Mihajlo Tomić (Serbia) Andjela Vitman
Botswana International	(Jordan) Bahaedeen Ahmad Alshannik	(South Africa) Johanita Scholtz	(Kazakhstan) Artur Niyazov (Kazakhstan) Dmitriy Panarin	(South Africa) Amy Ackerman (South Africa) Deidre Laurens Jordaan	(South Africa) Jarred Elliott (South Africa) Amy Ackerman
South Africa International	(Chinese Taipei) Hung Chun-chung	(Chinese Taipei) Lee Yu-hsuan	(Chinese Taipei) Lee Wen-che (Chinese Taipei) Liu Yu-che	(Chinese Taipei) Cheng Husan-ying (Chinese Taipei) Tsai Li-yu	(Chinese Taipei) Cheng Yu-yen (Chinese Taipei) Lee Yu-hua
Malta International	(Azerbaijan) Ade Resky Dwicahyo	(Indonesia) Gabriela Meilani Moningka	(Germany) Jarne Schlevoigt (Germany) Nikolaj Stupplich	(Netherlands) Kirsten de Wit (Netherlands) Alyssa Tirtosentono	(Germany) Malik Bourakkadi (Germany) Leona Michalski

== Statistics ==
=== Performance by countries ===
Below are the 2022 BWF Continental Circuit performances by country. Only countries who have won a title are listed:

==== International Challenge ====
Rank	Team	UKR	IRN	UGA	POL	MEX	ITA	DEN	FRA	REU	MGL	BEL	IND M	IND C	INA Y	INA M	IND B	AUS	NED	NZL	MDV	PER	IRL	WAL	BHR	BAN	CAN	MAS	Total
1	Japan					5				4	1	2	2	1	1					2	1	1	2				1		23
2	Chinese Taipei				1		2	1	2		1	2			1			5	2	3			1						21
3	India		2		2								2	4			4				3					2			19
4	Indonesia		1				2	1	1		1				3	3									2			1	15
5	Denmark				1				2														1	3			2		9
6	Malaysia	1		2																					1	1		3	8
7	Thailand							1					1				1								2	2			7
9	Canada			1																		2					1		4
9	France	1		1															1					1					4
9	Germany	2								1														1					4
9	South Korea						1	1			2																		4
12	United States																					2					1		3
13	China															2													2
13	Hong Kong				1			1																					2
13	Netherlands																		2										2
16	Algeria			1																									1
16	England																						1						1
16	Russia		1																										1
16	Singapore																											1	1
16	Spain																				1								1
16	Turkey	1																											1
16	Vietnam											1																	1

==== International Series ====
Rank	Team	EST	SWE	POR	NED	LUX	SLO	AUT	DOM	CMR	BRA	INA	POL	GTM	AUS	EGY	CZE	PER	VIE	HUN	NOR	MAS	BHR	MEX	ESA	Total
1	Chinese Taipei			3			2	4					2		5					2	3		2			23
2	Denmark				2	2	1										4									9
2	Indonesia			1		1	1					5										1				9
2	Thailand	3	2													2	1						1			9
5	Brazil								1		3							4								8
5	China																		4			4				8
7	Japan								2				3								1					6
8	Guatemala										1			2										1		4
8	Malaysia		1		1			1		1																4
8	United States																							2	2	4
11	Canada													1				0.5						1	1	3.5
11	England					1												0.5		1			1			3.5
13	France	1				1															1					3
13	Hong Kong			1	2																					3
13	Italy								1					1		1										3
16	Bulgaria													1						1						2
16	El Salvador										1														1	2
16	Germany															1							1			2
16	India									2																2
16	Philippines									2																2
21	Czech Republic		0.5																					1		1.5
22	Austria						1																			1
22	Estonia	1																								1
22	Hungary															1										1
22	Israel								1																	1
22	Netherlands																			1						1
22	Singapore		1																							1
22	Spain																								1	1
22	Vietnam																		1							1
30	Finland		0.5																							0.5

==== Future Series ====
Rank	Team	SVK	LTU	GER	CRO O	FRA	LAT	MEX	BEN	ESP	CRO I	BUL	ISR	GUA	ZAM	SLO	BOT	RSA	MLT	Total
1	Chinese Taipei	1		2			2				3	5						5		18
2	Indonesia		5	2												1			1	9
3	Denmark					1	1			3						1				6
4	Malaysia	1		1	1				2											5
5	Japan	1												1		2				4
5	South Africa														1		3			4
7	Azerbaijan														2				1	3
7	England				1			1		1										3
7	Germany												1						2	3
7	Philippines								3											3
7	Switzerland												3							3
12	China										2									2
12	France													2						2
12	Guatemala													2						2
12	Hong Kong	1			1															2
12	Italy						1						1							2
12	Jordan														1		1			2
12	Kazakhstan														1		1			2
12	Mexico							2												2
12	Singapore				1	1														2
12	United States							2												2
12	Vietnam				1	1														2
23	Netherlands									0.5									1	1.5
24	Estonia						1													1
24	India	1																		1
24	Serbia															1				1
24	Sweden					1														1
24	Thailand					1														1
29	Bulgaria									0.5										0.5

=== Performance by categories ===
These tables were calculated after the finals of the Malaysia International.

==== Men's singles ====
Rank	Player	IC	IS	FS	Total
1	(Chinese Taipei) Lin Chun-yi	3	2		5
2	(Denmark) Mads Christophersen	2	1		3
3	(Malaysia) Justin Hoh	1		2	3
4	(France) Christo Popov	2			2
4	(India) Meiraba Luwang Maisnam	2			2
6	(Denmark) Magnus Johannesen	1	1		2
6	(Japan) Yushi Tanaka	1	1		2
8	(Japan) Riku Hatano	1		1	2
9	(El Salvador) Uriel Canjura		2		2
10	(Indonesia) Syabda Perkasa Belawa		1	1	2
10	(Indonesia) Andi Fadel Muhammad		1	1	2
12	(Canada) Jason Ho-Shue	1			1
12	(China) Weng Hongyang	1			1
12	(Chinese Taipei) Lin Kuan-ting	1			1
12	(Chinese Taipei) Lu Chia-hung	1			1
12	(France) Arnaud Merklé	1			1
12	(Germany) Kai Schäfer	1			1
12	(India) Kiran George	1			1
12	(India) Mithun Manjunath	1			1
12	(India) Priyanshu Rajawat	1			1
12	(India) Sourabh Verma	1			1
12	(Indonesia) Christian Adinata	1			1
12	(Japan) Minoru Koga	1			1
12	(Japan) Takuma Obayashi	1			1
12	(Malaysia) Ng Tze Yong	1			1
12	(Spain) Luís Enrique Peñalver	1			1
27	(Austria) Collins Valentine Filimon		1		1
27	(Brazil) Jonathan Matias		1		1
27	(China) Liu Liang		1		1
27	(Chinese Taipei) Lee Chia-hao		1		1
27	(Denmark) Victor Svendsen		1		1
27	(France) Alex Lanier		1		1
27	(Germany) Samuel Hsiao		1		1
27	(Guatemala) Kevin Cordón		1		1
27	(India) Sathish Kumar Karunakaran		1		1
27	(Indonesia) Ikhsan Rumbay		1		1
27	(Israel) Misha Zilberman		1		1
27	(Italy) Giovanni Toti		1		1
27	(Malaysia) Kok Jing Hong		1		1
27	(Malaysia) Yeoh Seng Zoe		1		1
41	(Azerbaijan) Ade Resky Dwicahyo			1	1
41	(China) Liu Haichao			1	1
41	(Chinese Taipei) Hung Chun-chung			1	1
41	(Chinese Taipei) Wang Po-wei			1	1
41	(Denmark) Victor Ørding Kauffmann			1	1
41	(Germany) Matthias Kicklitz			1	1
41	(Italy) Christopher Vittoriani			1	1
41	(Japan) Yuta Kikuchi			1	1
41	(Jordan) Bahaedeen Ahmad Alshannik			1	1
41	(Kazakhstan) Dmitriy Panarin			1	1
41	(Malaysia) Ong Zhen Yi			1	1
41	(Mexico) Luis Montoya			1	1
41	(Singapore) Lim Ming Hong			1	1

==== Women's singles ====
Rank	Player	IC	IS	FS	Total
1	(Chinese Taipei) Hsu Wen-chi	3	2		5
2	(Japan) Riko Gunji	3			3
3	(Thailand) Pitchamon Opatniput	2	1		3
4	(India) Aakarshi Kashyap	2			2
4	(India) Tasnim Mir	2			2
6	(China) Gao Fangjie	1	1		2
6	(Chinese Taipei) Sung Shuo-yun	1	1		2
6	(Vietnam) Nguyễn Thùy Linh	1	1		2
9	(Brazil) Juliana Viana Vieira		2		2
9	(United States) Lauren Lam		2		2
11	(Vietnam) Vũ Thị Anh Thư			2	2
12	(Canada) Michelle Li	1			1
12	(Canada) Talia Ng	1			1
12	(Germany) Yvonne Li	1			1
12	(India) Tanya Hemanth	1			1
12	(India) Anupama Upadhyaya	1			1
12	(Indonesia) Sri Fatmawati	1			1
12	(Indonesia) Yulia Yosephine Susanto	1			1
12	(Indonesia) Ester Nurumi Tri Wardoyo	1			1
12	(Japan) Miho Kayama	1			1
12	(Japan) Shiori Saito	1			1
12	(Japan) Kaoru Sugiyama	1			1
12	(Turkey) Aliye Demirbağ	1			1
24	(Bulgaria) Kaloyana Nalbantova		1		1
24	(Bulgaria) Hristomira Popovska		1		1
24	(Chinese Taipei) Lin Hsiang-ti		1		1
24	(Chinese Taipei) Wang Yu-si		1		1
24	(Denmark) Amalie Schulz		1		1
24	(Estonia) Kristin Kuuba		1		1
24	(Hungary) Daniella Gonda		1		1
24	(Indonesia) Chiara Marvella Handoyo		1		1
24	(Indonesia) Mutiara Ayu Puspitasari		1		1
24	(Italy) Yasmine Hamza		1		1
24	(Japan) Hirari Mizui		1		1
24	(Japan) Natsuki Nidaira		1		1
24	(Malaysia) Myisha Mohd Khairul		1		1
24	(Malaysia) Kasturi Radhakrishnan		1		1
38	(Azerbaijan) Keisha Fatimah Az Zahra			1	1
38	(Chinese Taipei) Huang Ching-ping			1	1
38	(Chinese Taipei) Lee Yu-hsuan			1	1
38	(Chinese Taipei) Lin Sih-yun			1	1
38	(Chinese Taipei) Wang Pei-yu			1	1
38	(Denmark) Laura Fløj Thomsen			1	1
38	(France) Malya Hoareau			1	1
38	(India) Aditi Bhatt			1	1
38	(Indonesia) Aisyah Sativa Fatetani			1	1
38	(Indonesia) Gabriela Meilani Moningka			1	1
38	(Indonesia) Stephanie Widjaja			1	1
38	(Japan) Tomoka Miyazaki			1	1
38	(Malaysia) Loh Zhi Wei			1	1
38	(South Africa) Johanita Scholtz			1	1
38	(Switzerland) Dounia Pelupessy			1	1
38	(United States) Sanchita Pandey			1	1

==== Men's doubles ====
Rank	Players	IC	IS	FS	Total
1	(Denmark) Rasmus Kjær	3	1		4
1	(Denmark) Frederik Søgaard	3	1		4
3	(Chinese Taipei) Chiu Hsiang-chieh	1	1	2	4
3	(Chinese Taipei) Yang Ming-tse	1	1	2	4
5	(Chinese Taipei) Chang Ko-chi	3			3
5	(Chinese Taipei) Po Li-wei	3			3
7	(Japan) Ayato Endo	2	1		3
7	(Japan) Yuta Takei	2	1		3
9	(Indonesia) Rahmat Hidayat	2		1	3
10	(Thailand) Pharanyu Kaosamaang	1	2		3
10	(Thailand) Worrapol Thongsa-Nga	1	2		3
12	(Japan) Shuntaro Mezaki	2			2
12	(Japan) Haruya Nishida	2			2
14	(Chinese Taipei) Su Ching-heng	1	1		2
14	(Chinese Taipei) Ye Hong-wei	1	1		2
16	(Indonesia) Rayhan Fadillah	1		1	2
16	(Malaysia) Boon Xin Yuan	1		1	2
16	(Malaysia) Wong Tien Ci	1		1	2
19	(China) Chen Boyang		2		2
19	(China) Liu Yi		2		2
19	(Chinese Taipei) Lin Yu-chieh		2		2
19	(Chinese Taipei) Su Li-wei		2		2
23	(England) Kern Pong Lap Kan		1	1	2
23	(Philippines) Christian Bernardo		1	1	2
23	(Philippines) Alvin Morada		1	1	2
26	(Canada) Jason Ho-Shue	1			1
26	(Canada) Joshua Hurlburt-Yu	1			1
26	(India) Arjun M. R.	1			1
26	(India) Ishaan Bhatnagar	1			1
26	(India) Dhruv Kapila	1			1
26	(India) Rohan Kapoor	1			1
26	(India) Sai Pratheek K.	1			1
26	(India) B. Sumeeth Reddy	1			1
26	(Indonesia) Pramudya Kusumawardana	1			1
26	(Indonesia) Abiyyu Fauzan Majid	1			1
26	(Indonesia) Ferdian Mahardika Ranialdy	1			1
26	(Japan) Takumi Nomura	1			1
26	(Japan) Yuichi Shimogami	1			1
26	(Malaysia) Chia Wei Jie	1			1
26	(Malaysia) Muhammad Haikal	1			1
26	(Malaysia) Nur Izzuddin	1			1
26	(Malaysia) Low Hang Yee	1			1
26	(South Korea) Jin Yong	1			1
26	(South Korea) Na Sung-seung	1			1
26	(South Korea) Kim Jae-hwan	1			1
26	(South Korea) Yoon Dae-il	1			1
26	(Thailand) Chaloempon Charoenkitamorn	1			1
26	(Thailand) Nanthakarn Yordphaisong	1			1
49	(Brazil) Fabricio Farias		1		1
49	(Brazil) Francielton Farias		1		1
49	(Canada) Lam Wai Lok		1		1
49	(Canada) Kevin Lee		1		1
49	(Canada) Ty Alexander Lindeman		1		1
49	(Chinese Taipei) Chen Zhi-ray		1		1
49	(Chinese Taipei) Lu Chen		1		1
49	(Chinese Taipei) Lee Fang-chih		1		1
49	(Chinese Taipei) Lee Fang-jen		1		1
49	(Chinese Taipei) Wei Chun-wei		1		1
49	(Chinese Taipei) Wu Guan-xun		1		1
49	(Czech Republic) Ondřej Král		1		1
49	(Czech Republic) Adam Mendrek		1		1
49	(Denmark) Andreas Søndergaard		1		1
49	(Denmark) Jesper Toft		1		1
49	(Guatemala) Aníbal Marroquín		1		1
49	(Guatemala) Jonathan Solís		1		1
49	(Indonesia) Alfian Eko Prasetya		1		1
49	(Indonesia) Ade Yusuf Santoso		1		1
49	(Singapore) Andy Kwek		1		1
49	(Singapore) Danny Bawa Chrisnanta		1		1
49	(Thailand) Ruttanapak Oupthong		1		1
49	(Thailand) Tanadon Punpanich		1		1
49	(Thailand) Sirawit Sothon		1		1
49	(Thailand) Wachirawit Sothon		1		1
74	(Bulgaria) Alex Vlaar			1	1
74	(Chinese Taipei) Chiang Chien-wei			1	1
74	(Chinese Taipei) Lai Po-yu			1	1
74	(Chinese Taipei) Lee Wen-che			1	1
74	(Chinese Taipei) Liu Yu-che			1	1
74	(Chinese Taipei) Tsai Fu-cheng			1	1
74	(Chinese Taipei) Wu Hsuan-yi			1	1
74	(Denmark) Rasmus Espersen			1	1
74	(Denmark) Kristian Kræmer			1	1
74	(England) Larry Pong			1	1
74	(Germany) Jarne Schlevoigt			1	1
74	(Germany) Nikolaj Stupplich			1	1
74	(Guatemala) José Granados			1	1
74	(Guatemala) Antonio Ortíz			1	1
74	(Italy) Giovanni Greco			1	1
74	(Italy) David Salutt			1	1
74	(Kazakhstan) Artur Niyazov			1	1
74	(Kazakhstan) Dmitriy Panarin			1	1
74	(Netherlands) Noah Haase			1	1
74	(Singapore) Donovan Willard Wee			1	1
74	(Singapore) Howin Wong			1	1
74	(South Africa) Jarred Elliott			1	1
74	(South Africa) Robert Summers			1	1
74	(Thailand) Peeratchai Sukphun			1	1
74	(Thailand) Pakkapon Teeraratsakul			1	1

==== Women's doubles ====
Rank	Players	IC	IS	FS	Total
1	(Japan) Chisato Hoshi	3			3
1	(Japan) Miyu Takahashi	3			3
3	(Hong Kong) Yeung Nga Ting	2	1		3
3	(Hong Kong) Yeung Pui Lam	2	1		3
5	(Chinese Taipei) Lee Chia-hsin	1	1	1	3
5	(Chinese Taipei) Teng Chun-hsun	1	1	1	3
7	(Indonesia) Lanny Tria Mayasari	2			2
7	(Indonesia) Ribka Sugiarto	2			2
7	(Japan) Rui Hirokami	2			2
7	(Japan) Yuna Kato	2			2
11	(Chinese Taipei) Chang Ching-hui	1	1		2
11	(Chinese Taipei) Sung Shuo-yun	1	1		2
11	(Chinese Taipei) Yang Ching-tun	1	1		2
11	(Chinese Taipei) Yu Chien-hui	1	1		2
11	(United States) Paula Lynn Cao Hok	1	1		2
11	(United States) Lauren Lam	1	1		2
17	(Chinese Taipei) Hsu Ya-ching	1		1	2
17	(Chinese Taipei) Lin Wan-ching	1		1	2
19	(Brazil) Jaqueline Lima		2		2
19	(Brazil) Sâmia Lima		2		2
19	(England) Abbygael Harris		2		2
19	(Thailand) Chasinee Korepap		2		2
19	(Thailand) Jhenicha Sudjaipraparat		2		2
24	(Denmark) Julie Finne-Ipsen	1			1
24	(Denmark) Mai Surrow	1			1
24	(France) Margot Lambert	1			1
24	(France) Anne Tran	1			1
24	(Germany) Annabella Jäger	1			1
24	(Germany) Leona Michalski	1			1
24	(Germany) Stine Küspert	1			1
24	(Germany) Emma Moszczynski	1			1
24	(India) Ashwini Bhat K.	1			1
24	(India) Shikha Gautam	1			1
24	(Indonesia) Anggia Shitta Awanda	1			1
24	(Indonesia) Putri Larasati	1			1
24	(Malaysia) Kasturi Radhakrishnan	1			1
24	(Malaysia) Venosha Radhakrishnan	1			1
24	(Netherlands) Debora Jille	1			1
24	(Netherlands) Cheryl Seinen	1			1
24	(Russia) Ekaterina Malkova	1			1
24	(Russia) Anastasiia Shapovalova	1			1
24	(Singapore) Jin Yujia	1			1
24	(Singapore) Crystal Wong	1			1
24	(South Korea) Seong Seung-yeon	1			1
24	(South Korea) Yoon Min-ah	1			1
24	(Thailand) Laksika Kanlaha	1			1
24	(Thailand) Phataimas Muenwong	1			1
24	(United States) Annie Xu	1			1
24	(United States) Kerry Xu	1			1
50	(Brazil) Sania Lima		1		1
50	(Brazil) Tamires Santos		1		1
50	(Canada) Sharon Au		1		1
50	(Canada) Catherine Choi		1		1
50	(Canada) Jeslyn Chow		1		1
50	(Canada) Josephine Wu		1		1
50	(China) Li Yijing		1		1
50	(China) Liu Shengshu		1		1
50	(China) Luo Xumin		1		1
50	(China) Tan Ning		1		1
50	(Chinese Taipei) Liang Ting-yu		1		1
50	(Chinese Taipei) Wu Ti-jung		1		1
50	(Denmark) Christine Busch		1		1
50	(Denmark) Amalie Schulz		1		1
50	(England) Annie Lado		1		1
50	(England) Hope Warner		1		1
50	(Hong Kong) Ng Tsz Yau		1		1
50	(Hong Kong) Tsang Hiu Yan		1		1
50	(India) Srivedya Gurazada		1		1
50	(India) Poorvisha S. Ram		1		1
50	(Indonesia) Ririn Amelia		1		1
50	(Indonesia) Meilysa Trias Puspita Sari		1		1
50	(Indonesia) Virni Putri		1		1
50	(Indonesia) Rachel Allessya Rose		1		1
50	(Italy) Martina Corsini		1		1
50	(Italy) Judith Mair		1		1
50	(Japan) Miku Shigeta		1		1
50	(Japan) Yui Suizu		1		1
78	(Azerbaijan) Keisha Fatimah Az Zahra			1	1
78	(Azerbaijan) Era Maftuha			1	1
78	(China) Qiao Shijun			1	1
78	(China) Zhou Xinru			1	1
78	(Chinese Taipei) Cheng Husan-ying			1	1
78	(Chinese Taipei) Liu Chiao-yun			1	1
78	(Chinese Taipei) Tsai Li-yu			1	1
78	(Chinese Taipei) Wang Yu-qiao			1	1
78	(Denmark) Lærke Hvid			1	1
78	(Denmark) Emilia Nesic			1	1
78	(Estonia) Kati-Kreet Marran			1	1
78	(Estonia) Helina Rüütel			1	1
78	(Guatemala) Alejandra Paiz			1	1
78	(Guatemala) Mariana Paiz			1	1
78	(Hong Kong) Lui Lok Lok			1	1
78	(Hong Kong) Ng Shiu Yee			1	1
78	(Indonesia) Nethania Irawan			1	1
78	(Indonesia) Febi Setianingrum			1	1
78	(Japan) Hina Akechi			1	1
78	(Japan) Sorano Yoshikawa			1	1
78	(Mexico) Paula Lozoya			1	1
78	(Mexico) Fatima Rio			1	1
78	(Netherlands) Kirsten de Wit			1	1
78	(Netherlands) Alyssa Tirtosentono			1	1
78	(Philippines) Alyssa Leonardo			1	1
78	(Philippines) Thea Pomar			1	1
78	(South Africa) Amy Ackerman			1	1
78	(South Africa) Deidre Laurens Jordaan			1	1
78	(Sweden) Ronak Olyaee			1	1
78	(Sweden) Nathalie Wang			1	1
78	(Switzerland) Aline Müller			1	1
78	(Switzerland) Caroline Racloz			1	1

==== Mixed doubles ====
Rank	Players	IC	IS	FS	Total
1	(Indonesia) Dejan Ferdinansyah	2	1		3
1	(Indonesia) Gloria Emanuelle Widjaja	2	1		3
3	(Chinese Taipei) Lee Chia-hsin	1	2		3
3	(Chinese Taipei) Ye Hong-wei	1	2		3
5	(Indonesia) Winny Oktavina Kandow	1		2	3
5	(Indonesia) Amri Syahnawi	1		2	3
7	(Chinese Taipei) Chiu Hsiang-chieh		1	2	3
7	(Chinese Taipei) Lin Xiao-min		1	2	3
9	(Chinese Taipei) Chang Ko-chi	2			2
9	(Chinese Taipei) Lee Chih-chen	2			2
9	(India) Rohan Kapoor	2			2
9	(India) N. Sikki Reddy	2			2
9	(Thailand) Ruttanapak Oupthong	2			2
14	(England) Gregory Mairs	1	1		2
14	(England) Jenny Moore	1	1		2
14	(Japan) Minami Asakura	1	1		2
14	(Japan) Sumiya Nihei	1	1		2
14	(Thailand) Jhenicha Sudjaipraparat	1	1		2
14	(United States) Vinson Chiu	1	1		2
14	(United States) Jennie Gai	1	1		2
21	(France) Sharone Bauer		2		2
21	(France) Lucas Corvée		2		2
21	(Guatemala) Diana Corleto		2		2
21	(Guatemala) Jonathan Solís		2		2
21	(Thailand) Ratchapol Makkasasithorn		2		2
26	(Philippines) Alyssa Leonardo		1	1	2
26	(Philippines) Alvin Morada		1	1	2
28	(Denmark) Emil Lauritzen			2	2
28	(Denmark) Signe Schulz			2	2
28	(England) Sian Kelly			2	2
28	(England) Jonty Russ			2	2
32	(Algeria) Koceila Mammeri	1			1
32	(Algeria) Tanina Mammeri	1			1
32	(Denmark) Clara Graversen	1			1
32	(Denmark) Amalie Magelund	1			1
32	(Denmark) Mathias Thyrri	1			1
32	(Denmark) Jesper Toft	1			1
32	(Germany) Linda Efler	1			1
32	(Germany) Jones Ralfy Jansen	1			1
32	(India) Ashwini Ponnappa	1			1
32	(India) Sai Pratheek K.	1			1
32	(Indonesia) Akbar Bintang Cahyono	1			1
32	(Indonesia) Marsheilla Gischa Islami	1			1
32	(Indonesia) Hediana Julimarbela	1			1
32	(Indonesia) Zachariah Josiahno Sumanti	1			1
32	(Japan) Moe Ikeuchi	1			1
32	(Japan) Hiroki Midorikawa	1			1
32	(Japan) Natsu Saito	1			1
32	(Japan) Naoki Yamada	1			1
32	(Malaysia) Chen Tang Jie	1			1
32	(Malaysia) Hoo Pang Ron	1			1
32	(Malaysia) Teoh Mei Xing	1			1
32	(Malaysia) Toh Ee Wei	1			1
32	(Netherlands) Selena Piek	1			1
32	(Netherlands) Robin Tabeling	1			1
32	(South Korea) Choi Hyun-beom	1			1
32	(South Korea) Yoon Min-ah	1			1
58	(Brazil) Fabricio Farias		1		1
58	(Brazil) Jaqueline Lima		1		1
58	(China) Chen Fanghui		1		1
58	(China) Cheng Xing		1		1
58	(China) Jiang Zhenbang		1		1
58	(China) Wei Yaxin		1		1
58	(Chinese Taipei) Chen Xin-yuan		1		1
58	(Chinese Taipei) Yang Ching-tun		1		1
58	(Czech Republic) Alžběta Bášová		1		1
58	(Denmark) Christine Busch		1		1
58	(Denmark) Kristian Kræmer		1		1
58	(Denmark) Amalie Cecilie Kudsk		1		1
58	(Denmark) Mads Vestergaard		1		1
58	(Finland) Anton Kaisti		1		1
58	(Hong Kong) Lee Chun Hei		1		1
58	(Hong Kong) Ng Tsz Yau		1		1
58	(Netherlands) Alyssa Tirtosentono		1		1
58	(Netherlands) Brian Wassink		1		1
58	(Spain) Joan Monroy		1		1
58	(Spain) Ania Setien		1		1
58	(Thailand) Chasinee Korepap		1		1
79	(Chinese Taipei) Cheng Yu-yen			1	1
79	(Chinese Taipei) Lee Yu-hua			1	1
79	(France) Tino Daoudal			1	1
79	(France) Malya Hoareau			1	1
79	(Germany) Malik Bourakkadi			1	1
79	(Germany) Leona Michalski			1	1
79	(Hong Kong) Yeung Ming Nok			1	1
79	(Hong Kong) Yeung Pui Lam			1	1
79	(Jordan) Bahaedeen Ahmad Alshannik			1	1
79	(Jordan) Domou Amro			1	1
79	(South Africa) Amy Ackerman			1	1
79	(South Africa) Jarred Elliott			1	1
79	(Serbia) Mihajlo Tomić			1	1
79	(Serbia) Andjela Vitman			1	1
79	(Switzerland) Minh Quang Pham			1	1
79	(Switzerland) Caroline Racloz			1	1
79	(United States) Ryan Zheng			1	1
79	(United States) Sanchita Pandey			1	1
