= 2023 Badminton Asia Championships - Qualification =

Following the results for the 2023 Badminton Asia Championships qualification.

== Qualification ==
=== Final standings ===
Group	Men's singles	Women's singles	Men's doubles	Women's doubles	Mixed doubles
A	(Maldives) Hussein Zayan Shaheed	(Sri Lanka) Rashmi Mudalige	(Vietnam) Nguyễn Đình Hoàng (Vietnam) Trần Đình Mạnh	(Hong Kong) Lui Lok Lok (Hong Kong) Ng Wing Yung	(Sri Lanka) Chamath Dias (Sri Lanka) Natasha Gunasekera
B	(Nepal) Prince Dahal	(Kazakhstan) Kamila Smagulova	(United Arab Emirates) Dev Ayyappan (United Arab Emirates) Dhiren Ayyappan	(Philippines) Alyssa Ysabel Leonardo (Philippines) Thea Marie Pomar	(Vietnam) Phạm Văn Hải (Vietnam) Thân Vân Anh
C	(United Arab Emirates) Bharath Latheesh	(Myanmar) Thet Htar Thuzar	(Thailand) Tanadon Punpanich (Thailand) Wachirawit Sothon	(Chinese Taipei) Hsieh Pei-shan (Chinese Taipei) Tseng Yu-chi	(India) Rohan Kapoor (India) N. Sikki Reddy
D	(Philippines) Jewel Albo	(Hong Kong) Yeung Sum Yee	(Singapore) Andy Kwek (Singapore) Loh Kean Hean	(Malaysia) Ng Qi Xuan (Malaysia) Teoh Le Xuan	(Thailand) Ratchapol Makkasasithorn (Thailand) Chasinee Korepap

=== Men's singles ===
==== Seeds ====
1. (Maldives) Hussein Zayan Shaheed (qualified)
2. (Mongolia) Batdavaa Munkhbat (group stage)
3. (Philippines) Jewel Albo (qualified)
4. (Iran) Salar Bayat (group stage)

==== Group A ====
Pos	Team	Pld	W	L	GF	GA	GD	PF	PA	PD	Pts
1	(Maldives) Hussein Zayan Shaheed	2	2	0	4	1	+3	100	57	+43	2
2	(Brunei) Kah Kit Kan	2	1	1	3	2	+1	89	70	+19	1
3	(United Arab Emirates) Mohammad Falamarzi (H)	2	0	2	0	4	−4	22	84	−62	0

Source: Tournament Software
(H) Host

Date		Score		Set 1	Set 2	Set 3
25 April	Kah Kit Kan (Brunei)	1–2	(Maldives) Hussein Zayan Shaheed	21–16	11–21	15–21
25 April	Kah Kit Kan (Brunei)	2–0	(United Arab Emirates) Mohammad Falamarzi	21–8	21–4	
25 April	Hussein Zayan Shaheed (Maldives)	2–0	(United Arab Emirates) Mohammad Falamarzi	21–5	21–5	

==== Group B ====
Pos	Team	Pld	W	L	GF	GA	GD	PF	PA	PD	Pts
1	(Nepal) Prince Dahal	2	2	0	4	0	+4	84	43	+41	2
2	(Mongolia) Batdavaa Munkhbat	2	1	1	2	2	0	71	58	+13	1
3	(Saudi Arabia) Nawaf Alghamdi	2	0	2	0	4	−4	30	84	−54	0

Source: Tournament Software

Date		Score		Set 1	Set 2	Set 3
25 April	Nawaf Alghamdi (Saudi Arabia)	0–2	(Mongolia) Batdavaa Munkhbat	8–21	8–21	
25 April	Nawaf Alghamdi (Saudi Arabia)	0–2	(Nepal) Prince Dahal	6–21	8–21	
25 April	Batdavaa Munkhbat (Mongolia)	0–2	(Nepal) Prince Dahal	13–21	16–21	

==== Group C ====
Pos	Team	Pld	W	L	GF	GA	GD	PF	PA	PD	Pts
1	(United Arab Emirates) Bharath Latheesh (H)	2	2	0	4	0	+4	84	46	+38	2
2	(Iran) Salar Bayat	2	1	1	2	2	0	71	69	+2	1
3	(Iraq) Yousif Alhumairi	2	0	2	0	4	−4	44	84	−40	0

Source: Tournament Software
(H) Host

Date		Score		Set 1	Set 2	Set 3
25 April	Salar Bayat (Iran)	2–0	(Iraq) Yousif Alhumairi	21–16	21–11	
25 April	Yousif Alhumairi (Iraq)	0–2	(United Arab Emirates) Bharath Latheesh	9–21	8–21	
25 April	Salar Bayat (Iran)	0–2	(United Arab Emirates) Bharath Latheesh	13–21	16–21	

==== Group D ====
Pos	Team	Pld	W	L	GF	GA	GD	PF	PA	PD	Pts
1	(Philippines) Jewel Albo	2	2	0	4	1	+3	103	72	+31	2
2	(Syria) Aljallad Ahmad	2	1	1	3	3	0	110	107	+3	1
3	(Timor-Leste) Raymond Sing	2	0	2	1	4	−3	69	103	−34	0

Source: Tournament Software

Date		Score		Set 1	Set 2	Set 3
25 April	Jewel Albo (Philippines)	2–1	(Syria) Aljallad Ahmad	21–17	19–21	21–11
25 April	Aljallad Ahmad (Syria)	2–1	(Timor-Leste) Raymond Sing	21–14	19–21	21–11
25 April	Jewel Albo (Philippines)	2–0	(Timor-Leste) Raymond Sing	21–14	21–9	

=== Women's singles ===
==== Seeds ====
1. (Vietnam) Nguyễn Thùy Linh (promoted to main draw)
2. (Indonesia) Komang Ayu Cahya Dewi (promoted to main draw)
3. (Myanmar) Thet Htar Thuzar (qualified)
4. (Hong Kong) Yeung Sum Yee (qualified)

==== Group A ====
Pos	Team	Pld	W	L	GF	GA	GD	PF	PA	PD	Pts
1	(Sri Lanka) Rashmi Mudalige	1	1	0	2	0	+2	42	35	+7	1
2	(Iran) Romina Tajik	1	0	1	0	2	−2	35	42	−7	0

Source: Tournament Software

Date		Score		Set 1	Set 2	Set 3
25 April	Romina Tajik (Iran)	0–2	(Sri Lanka) Rashmi Mudalige	17–21	18–21	

==== Group B ====
Pos	Team	Pld	W	L	GF	GA	GD	PF	PA	PD	Pts
1	(Kazakhstan) Kamila Smagulova	1	1	0	1	0	+1	42	32	+10	1
2	(Maldives) Fathimath Nabaaha Abdul Razzaq	1	0	1	0	1	−1	32	42	−10	0

Source: Tournament Software

Date		Score		Set 1	Set 2	Set 3
25 April	Kamila Smagulova (Kazakhstan)	2–0	(Maldives) Fathimath Nabaaha Abdul Razzaq	21–17	21–15	

==== Group C ====
Pos	Team	Pld	W	L	GF	GA	GD	PF	PA	PD	Pts
1	(Myanmar) Thet Htar Thuzar	2	2	0	4	1	+3	98	58	+40	2
2	(Philippines) Mikaela Joy De Guzman	2	1	1	3	2	+1	82	78	+4	1
3	(United Arab Emirates) Madhumitha Sundarapandian (H)	2	0	2	0	4	−4	40	84	−44	0

Source: Tournament Software
(H) Host

Date		Score		Set 1	Set 2	Set 3
25 April	Thet Htar Thuzar (Myanmar)	2–0	(United Arab Emirates) Madhumitha Sundarapandian	21–8	21–10	
25 April	Mikaela Joy De Guzman (Philippines)	2–0	(United Arab Emirates) Madhumitha Sundarapandian	21–6	21–16	
25 April	Thet Htar Thuzar (Myanmar)	2–1	(Philippines) Mikaela Joy De Guzman	14–21	21–7	21–12

==== Group D ====
Pos	Team	Pld	W	L	GF	GA	GD	PF	PA	PD	Pts
1	(Hong Kong) Yeung Sum Yee	2	2	0	4	0	+4	84	38	+46	2
2	(Nepal) Rasila Maharjan	2	1	1	2	2	0	66	75	−9	1
3	(United Arab Emirates) Zainaba Reem Siraj (H)	2	0	2	0	4	−4	47	84	−37	0

Source: Tournament Software
(H) Host

Date		Score		Set 1	Set 2	Set 3
25 April	Yeung Sum Yee (Hong Kong)	2–0	(Nepal) Rasila Maharjan	21–12	21–12	
25 April	Rasila Maharjan (Nepal)	2–0	(United Arab Emirates) Zainaba Reem Siraj	21–16	21–17	
25 April	Yeung Sum Yee (Hong Kong)	2–0	(United Arab Emirates) Zainaba Reem Siraj	21–8	21–6	

=== Men's doubles ===
==== Seeds ====
1. (Philippines) Christian Bernardo / Alvin Morada (promoted to main draw)
2. (India) P. S. Ravikrishna / Sankar Prasad Udayakumar (promoted to main draw)
3. (Thailand) Pharanyu Kaosamaang / Worrapol Thongsa-Nga (group stage)
4. (Thailand) Tanadon Punpanich / Wachirawit Sothon (qualified)

==== Group A ====
Pos	Team	Pld	W	L	GF	GA	GD	PF	PA	PD	Pts
1	(Vietnam) Nguyễn Đình Hoàng (Vietnam) Trần Đình Mạnh	1	1	0	2	0	+2	42	10	+32	1
2	(United Arab Emirates) Nasser Alsayegh (United Arab Emirates) Abdulaziz Yahya (H)	1	0	1	0	2	−2	10	42	−32	0

Source: Tournament Software
(H) Host

Date		Score		Set 1	Set 2	Set 3
25 April	Nasser Alsayegh (United Arab Emirates); Abdulaziz Yahya (United Arab Emirates)	0–2	(Vietnam) Nguyễn Đình Hoàng (Vietnam) Trần Đình Mạnh	3–21	7–21	

==== Group B ====
Pos	Team	Pld	W	L	GF	GA	GD	PF	PA	PD	Pts
1	(United Arab Emirates) Dev Ayyappan (United Arab Emirates) Dhiren Ayyappan (H)	1	1	0	2	1	+1	58	55	+3	1
2	(Bangladesh) Md. Abdul Hamid Lukman (Bangladesh) Gourab Singha	1	0	1	1	2	−1	55	58	−3	0

Source: Tournament Software
(H) Host

Date		Score		Set 1	Set 2	Set 3
25 April	Md. Abdul Hamid Lukman (Bangladesh); Gourab Singha (Bangladesh)	1–2	(United Arab Emirates) Dev Ayyappan (United Arab Emirates) Dhiren Ayyappan	21–16	15–21	19–21

==== Group C ====
Pos	Team	Pld	W	L	GF	GA	GD	PF	PA	PD	Pts
1	(Thailand) Tanadon Punpanich (Thailand) Wachirawit Sothon	2	2	0	4	1	+3	103	59	+44	2
2	(Hong Kong) Law Cheuk Him (Hong Kong) Yeung Shing Choi	2	1	1	3	2	+1	92	79	+13	1
3	(Maldives) Ahmed Nibal (Maldives) Mohamed Ajfan Rasheed	2	0	2	0	4	−4	27	84	−57	0

Source: Tournament Software

Date		Score		Set 1	Set 2	Set 3
25 April	Ahmed Nibal (Maldives); Mohamed Ajfan Rasheed (Maldives)	0–2	(Thailand) Tanadon Punpanich (Thailand) Wachirawit Sothon	5–21	4–21	
25 April	Law Cheuk Him (Hong Kong); Yeung Shing Choi (Hong Kong)	2–0	(Maldives) Ahmed Nibal (Maldives) Mohamed Ajfan Rasheed	21–10	21–8	
25 April	Law Cheuk Him (Hong Kong); Yeung Shing Choi (Hong Kong)	1–2	(Thailand) Tanadon Punpanich (Thailand) Wachirawit Sothon	21–19	15–21	14–21

==== Group D ====
Pos	Team	Pld	W	L	GF	GA	GD	PF	PA	PD	Pts
1	(Singapore) Andy Kwek (Singapore) Loh Kean Hean	2	2	0	4	0	+4	84	46	+38	2
2	(Thailand) Pharanyu Kaosamaang (Thailand) Worrapol Thongsa-Nga	2	1	1	2	2	0	80	55	+25	1
3	(Saudi Arabia) Abdullah Aldawsari (Saudi Arabia) Yazan Saigh	2	0	2	0	4	−4	21	84	−63	0

Source: Tournament Software

Date		Score		Set 1	Set 2	Set 3
25 April	Abdullah Aldawsari (Saudi Arabia); Yazan Saigh (Saudi Arabia)	0–2	(Singapore) Andy Kwek (Singapore) Loh Kean Hean	2–21	6–21	
25 April	Abdullah Aldawsari (Saudi Arabia); Yazan Saigh (Saudi Arabia)	0–2	(Thailand) Pharanyu Kaosamaang (Thailand) Worrapol Thongsa-Nga	4–21	9–21	
25 April	Andy Kwek (Singapore); Loh Kean Hean (Singapore)	2–0	(Thailand) Pharanyu Kaosamaang (Thailand) Worrapol Thongsa-Nga	21–19	21–19	

=== Women's doubles ===
==== Seeds ====
1. (India) Haritha Manazhiyil / Ashna Roy (promoted to main draw)
2. (India) Simran Singhi / Ritika Thaker (group stage)
3. (Hong Kong) Fan Ka Yan / Yau Mau Ying (group stage)
4. (Malaysia) Ng Qi Xuan / Teoh Le Xuan (qualified)

==== Group A ====
Pos	Team	Pld	W	L	GF	GA	GD	PF	PA	PD	Pts
1	(Hong Kong) Lui Lok Lok (Hong Kong) Ng Wing Yung	1	1	0	2	0	+2	42	9	+33	1
2	(Iran) Kiana Hashemi (Iran) Romina Tajik	1	0	1	0	2	−2	9	42	−33	0

Source: Tournament Software

Date		Score		Set 1	Set 2	Set 3
25 April	Lui Lok Lok (Hong Kong); Ng Wing Yung (Hong Kong)	2–0	(Iran) Kiana Hashemi (Iran) Romina Tajik	21–4	21–5	

==== Group B ====
Pos	Team	Pld	W	L	GF	GA	GD	PF	PA	PD	Pts
1	(Philippines) Alyssa Leonardo (Philippines) Thea Marie Pomar	2	2	0	4	1	+3	99	69	+30	2
2	(India) Simran Singhi (India) Ritika Thaker	2	1	1	3	2	+1	89	82	+7	1
3	(Maldives) Aminath Nabeeha Abdul Razzaq (Maldives) Fathimath Nabaaha Abdul Razzaq	2	0	2	0	4	−4	47	84	−37	0

Source: Tournament Software

Date		Score		Set 1	Set 2	Set 3
25 April	Simran Singhi (India); Ritika Thaker (India)	1–2	(Philippines) Alyssa Leonardo (Philippines) Thea Marie Pomar	15–21	21–15	11–21
25 April	Aminath Nabeeha Abdul Razzaq (Maldives); Fathimath Nabaaha Abdul Razzaq (Maldives)	0–2	(Philippines) Alyssa Leonardo (Philippines) Thea Marie Pomar	12–21	10–21	
25 April	Simran Singhi (India); Ritika Thaker (India)	2–0	(Maldives) Aminath Nabeeha Abdul Razzaq (Maldives) Fathimath Nabaaha Abdul Razzaq	21–10	21–15	

==== Group C ====
Pos	Team	Pld	W	L	GF	GA	GD	PF	PA	PD	Pts
1	(Chinese Taipei) Hsieh Pei-shan (Chinese Taipei) Tseng Yu-chi	2	2	0	4	0	+4	84	37	+47	2
2	(Hong Kong) Fan Ka Yan (Hong Kong) Yau Mau Ying	2	1	1	2	2	0	74	48	+26	1
3	(United Arab Emirates) Farah Alhajji (United Arab Emirates) Ghadeer Ali Altahri (H)	2	0	2	0	4	−4	11	84	−73	0

Source: Tournament Software
(H) Host

Date		Score		Set 1	Set 2	Set 3
25 April	Fan Ka Yan (Hong Kong); Yau Mau Ying (Hong Kong)	2–0	(United Arab Emirates) Farah Alhajji (United Arab Emirates) Ghadeer Ali Altahri	21–3	21–3	
25 April	Hsieh Pei-shan (Chinese Taipei); Tseng Yu-chi (Chinese Taipei)	2–0	(United Arab Emirates) Farah Alhajji (United Arab Emirates) Ghadeer Ali Altahri	21–1	21–4	
25 April	Fan Ka Yan (Hong Kong); Yau Mau Ying (Hong Kong)	0–2	(Chinese Taipei) Hsieh Pei-shan (Chinese Taipei) Tseng Yu-chi	17–21	15–21	

==== Group D ====
Pos	Team	Pld	W	L	GF	GA	GD	PF	PA	PD	Pts
1	(Malaysia) Ng Qi Xuan (Malaysia) Teoh Le Xuan	2	2	0	4	0	+4	84	49	+35	2
2	(Vietnam) Đinh Thị Phương Hồng (Vietnam) Phạm Thị Khánh	2	1	1	2	2	0	75	52	+23	1
3	(United Arab Emirates) Sanika Dhawan Gurav (United Arab Emirates) Akansha Raj (H)	2	0	2	0	4	−4	26	84	−58	0

Source: Tournament Software
(H) Host

Date		Score		Set 1	Set 2	Set 3
25 April	Ng Qi Xuan (Malaysia); Teoh Le Xuan (Malaysia)	2–0	(Vietnam) Đinh Thị Phương Hồng (Vietnam) Phạm Thị Khánh	21–18	21–15	
25 April	Ng Qi Xuan (Malaysia); Teoh Le Xuan (Malaysia)	2–0	(United Arab Emirates) Sanika Dhawan Gurav (United Arab Emirates) Akansha Raj	21–7	21–9	
25 April	Sanika Dhawan Gurav (United Arab Emirates); Akansha Raj (United Arab Emirates)	0–2	(Vietnam) Đinh Thị Phương Hồng (Vietnam) Phạm Thị Khánh	5–21	5–21	

=== Mixed doubles ===
==== Seeds ====
1. (India) B. Sumeeth Reddy / Ashwini Ponnappa (promoted to main draw)
2. (India) Venkat Gaurav Prasad / Juhi Dewangan (group stage)
3. (Thailand) Ratchapol Makkasasithorn / Chasinee Korepap (qualified)
4. (India) Rohan Kapoor / N. Sikki Reddy (qualified)

==== Group A ====
Pos	Team	Pld	W	L	GF	GA	GD	PF	PA	PD	Pts
1	(Sri Lanka) Chamath Dias (Sri Lanka) Natasha Gunasekera	1	1	0	2	0	+2	44	40	+4	1
2	(Maldives) Hussein Zayan Shaheed (Maldives) Fathimath Nabaaha Abdul Razzaq	1	0	1	0	2	−2	40	44	−4	0

Source: Tournament Software

Waktu		Score		Set 1	Set 2	Set 3
25 April	Hussein Zayan Shaheed (Maldives); Fathimath Nabaaha Abdul Razzaq (Maldives)	0–2	(Sri Lanka) Chamath Dias (Sri Lanka) Natasha Gunasekera	19–21	21–23	

==== Group B ====
Pos	Team	Pld	W	L	GF	GA	GD	PF	PA	PD	Pts
1	(Vietnam) Phạm Văn Hải (Vietnam) Thân Vân Anh	2	2	0	4	1	+3	101	72	+29	2
2	(India) Venkat Gaurav Prasad (India) Juhi Dewangan	2	1	1	3	3	0	111	96	+15	1
3	(Nepal) Prince Dahal (Nepal) Rasila Maharjan	2	0	2	1	4	−3	58	102	−44	0

Source: Tournament Software

Date		Score		Set 1	Set 2	Set 3
25 April	Venkat Gaurav Prasad (India); Juhi Dewangan (India)	1–2	(Vietnam) Phạm Văn Hải (Vietnam) Thân Vân Anh	21–17	18–21	12–21
25 April	Prince Dahal (Nepal); Rasila Maharjan (Nepal)	0–2	(Vietnam) Phạm Văn Hải (Vietnam) Thân Vân Anh	10–21	11–21	
25 April	Venkat Gaurav Prasad (India); Juhi Dewangan (India)	2–1	(Nepal) Prince Dahal (Nepal) Rasila Maharjan	18–21	21–3	21–13

==== Group C ====
Pos	Team	Pld	W	L	GF	GA	GD	PF	PA	PD	Pts
1	(India) Rohan Kapoor (India) N. Sikki Reddy	2	2	0	4	0	+4	88	66	+22	2
2	(Philippines) Alvin Morada (Philippines) Alyssa Ysabel Leonardo	2	1	1	2	2	0	82	77	+5	1
3	(United Arab Emirates) Dev Vishnu (United Arab Emirates) Taabia Khan (H)	2	0	2	0	4	−4	57	84	−27	0

Source: Tournament Software
(H) Host

Date		Score		Set 1	Set 2	Set 3
25 April	Rohan Kapoor (India); N. Sikki Reddy (India)	2–0	(Philippines) Alvin Morada (Philippines) Alyssa Ysabel Leonardo	21–17	25–23	
25 April	Alvin Morada (Philippines); Alyssa Ysabel Leonardo (Philippines)	2–0	(United Arab Emirates) Dev Vishnu (United Arab Emirates) Taabia Khan	21–18	21–13	
25 April	Rohan Kapoor (India); N. Sikki Reddy (India)	2–0	(United Arab Emirates) Dev Vishnu (United Arab Emirates) Taabia Khan	21–15	21–11	

==== Group D ====
Pos	Team	Pld	W	L	GF	GA	GD	PF	PA	PD	Pts
1	(Thailand) Ratchapol Makkasasithorn (Thailand) Chasinee Korepap	2	2	0	4	1	+3	109	71	+38	2
2	(India) Nithin H. V. (India) Poorvisha S. Ram	2	1	1	3	2	+1	100	88	+12	1
3	(United Arab Emirates) Aakash Ravikumar (United Arab Emirates) Aleena Qathun (H)	2	0	2	0	4	−4	34	84	−50	0

Source: Tournament Software
(H) Host

Date		Score		Set 1	Set 2	Set 3
25 April	Nithin H. V. (India); Poorvisha S. Ram (India)	2–0	(United Arab Emirates) Aakash Ravikumar (United Arab Emirates) Aleena Qathun	21–12	21–9	
25 April	Nithin H. V. (India); Poorvisha S. Ram (India)	1–2	(Thailand) Ratchapol Makkasasithorn (Thailand) Chasinee Korepap	22–24	24–22	12–21
25 April	Ratchapol Makkasasithorn (Thailand); Chasinee Korepap (Thailand)	2–0	(United Arab Emirates) Aakash Ravikumar (United Arab Emirates) Aleena Qathun	21–7	21–6	
