= 2023 BWF World Championships qualification =

Badminton qualification

This is the list of entries for the 2023 BWF World Championships qualification.

== Overview ==
=== Events ===
==== Number of players/member association quota ====
This event's total limit of eligibility players is 400 players, the following charts are the rules and the distribution.

	Men's singles	Women's singles	Men's doubles	Women's doubles	Mixed doubles	Total
Entry limits	64 players	48 players	96 players (48 pairs)	96 players (48 pairs)	96 players (48 pairs)	400 players

Players/pairs ranked on date eligible	Total number of players/pairs from any one Member Association in that event must not exceed
1 to 8	4
9 to 24	3
25 to 150	2

== Participating players ==
=== Men's singles ===
According to the phase 2 updated by BWF, the following table is the invitation results.

Players who ranked from 1 to 8, whose association could nominate 4 players.
Players who ranked from 9 to 24, whose association could nominate 3 players.
Players who ranked from 25 to 150, whose association could nominate 2 players.

Rank	Nation / Player	Points	Eligibility		Note
Qualifiers
1	(Denmark) Viktor Axelsen	108,206	1	Denmark (1)	Host nation presenter, BE highest ranked
2	(Indonesia) Anthony Sinisuka Ginting	77,579	2	Indonesia (1)	BA highest ranked
3	(Indonesia) Jonatan Christie	76,112	3	Indonesia (2)	
4	(Malaysia) Lee Zii Jia	75,868	4	Malaysia (1)	
5	(Japan) Kodai Naraoka	73,322	5	Japan (1)	
6	(Chinese Taipei) Chou Tien-chen	71,266	6	Chinese Taipei (1)	
7	(Singapore) Loh Kean Yew	68,874	7	Singapore (1)	
8	(Thailand) Kunlavut Vitidsarn	67,039	8	Thailand (1)	
9	(India) Prannoy H. S.	64,347	9	India (1)	
10	(China) Shi Yuqi	62,400	10	China (1)	
11	(China) Li Shifeng	61,893	11	China (2)	
12	(Japan) Kenta Nishimoto	58,069	12	Japan (2)	
13	(Denmark) Anders Antonsen	56,653	13	Denmark (2)	
14	(China) Lu Guangzu	55,950	14	China (3)	
15	(Japan) Kanta Tsuneyama	55,898	15	Japan (3)	
16	(China) Zhao Junpeng	55,668	64	China (4)	
17	(Hong Kong) Ng Ka Long	54,902	16	Hong Kong (1)	
18	(Indonesia) Chico Aura Dwi Wardoyo	54,264	17	Indonesia (3)	
19	(Denmark) Rasmus Gemke	50,841	18	Denmark (3)	
20	(Hong Kong) Lee Cheuk Yiu	50,794	19	Hong Kong (2)	
22	(Chinese Taipei) Wang Tzu-wei	46,946	20	Chinese Taipei (2)	
23	(India) Srikanth Kidambi	46,131	21	India (2)	
24	(India) Lakshya Sen	45,424	22	India (3)	
25	(Malaysia) Ng Tze Yong	44,324	23	Malaysia (2)	
26	(France) Toma Junior Popov	42,213	24	France (1)	
29	(Canada) Brian Yang	40,230	25	Canada (1)	BPA highest ranked
31	(Thailand) Kantaphon Wangcharoen	39,842	26	Thailand (2)	
32	(Republic of Ireland) Nhat Nguyen	39,529	27	Ireland (1)	
37	(Israel) Misha Zilberman	32,854	28	Israel (1)	
39	(France) Christo Popov	30,030	29	France (2)	
41	(Netherlands) Mark Caljouw	29,015	30	Netherlands (1)	
44	(Guatemala) Kevin Cordón	28,432	31	Guatemala (1)	
45	(Spain) Luís Enrique Peñalver	27,773	32	Spain (1)	
54	(Brazil) Ygor Coelho	24,360	33	Brazil (1)	
59	(South Korea) Jeon Hyeok-jin	23,099	34	South Korea (1)	
63	(Czech Republic) Jan Louda	22,840	35	Czech Republic (1)	
66	(Germany) Kai Schäfer	22,282	36	Germany (1)	
73	(El Salvador) Uriel Canjura	20,950	37	El Salvador (1)	
78	(Brazil) Jonathan Matias	19,241	38	Brazil (2)	
79	(Netherlands) Joran Kweekel	19,103	39	Netherlands (2)	
80	(Belgium) Julien Carraggi	18,598	40	Belgium (1)	
81	(Singapore) Jason Teh	18,449	41	Singapore (2)	
82	(Germany) Max Weißkirchen	17,740	42	Germany (2)	
85	(Azerbaijan) Ade Resky Dwicahyo	17,140	43	Azerbaijan (1)	
89	(Finland) Kalle Koljonen	16,231	44	Finland (1)	
94	(Portugal) Bernardo Atilano	15,198	45	Portugal (1)	
98	(Slovakia) Milan Dratva	14,780	46	Slovakia (1)	
101	(Switzerland) Tobias Künzi	14,277	47	Switzerland (1)	
102	(Jordan) Bahaedeen Ahmad Alshannik	14,240	48	Jordan (1)	
104	(Kazakhstan) Dmitriy Panarin	14,156	49	Kazakhstan (1)	
105	(Spain) Pablo Abián	14,040	50	Spain (2)	
107	(Nigeria) Anuoluwapo Juwon Opeyori	13,582	51	Nigeria (1)	BCA highest ranked
109	(Austria) Luka Wraber	13,313	52	Austria (1)	
110	(Italy) Fabio Caponio	13,255	53	Italy (1)	
112	(United States) Howard Shu	13,119	54	United States (1)	
114	(Ukraine) Danylo Bosniuk	12,958	55	Ukraine (1)	
115	(Italy) Giovanni Toti	12,722	56	Italy (2)	
117	(Canada) B. R. Sankeerth	12,482	57	Canada (2)	
119	(Mauritius) Julien Paul	12,201	58	Mauritius (1)	
126	(United States) Justin Ma	11,610	59	United States (2)	
128	(Egypt) Adham Hatem Elgamal	11,476	60	Egypt (1)	
131	(Australia) Nathan Tang	11,090	61	Australia (1)	BO highest ranked
132	(Mexico) Job Castillo	11,010	62	Mexico (1)	
138	(Vietnam) Nguyễn Hải Đăng	10,380	63	Vietnam (1)	
Reserve
21	(Japan) Kento Momota	47,524	2	Japan (4)	
27	(Indonesia) Shesar Hiren Rhustavito	41,293	3	Indonesia (4)	
28	(Chinese Taipei) Lin Chun-yi	40,500	4	Chinese Taipei (3)	
30	(China) Weng Hongyang	39,983	5	China (5)	
33	(Japan) Koki Watanabe	37,907	6	Japan (5)	
34	(Malaysia) Liew Daren	37,439	7	Malaysia (3)	
35	(Denmark) Hans-Kristian Vittinghus	36,142	8	Denmark (4)	
36	(Thailand) Sitthikom Thammasin	35,216	9	Thailand (3)	
38	(India) Priyanshu Rajawat	30,786	10	India (4)	
40	(Denmark) Magnus Johannesen	29,880	11	Denmark (4)	
42	(France) Brice Leverdez	28,490	12	France (3)	
46	(India) Mithun Manjunath	27,660	13	India (5)	
47	(France) Alex Lanier	27,305	14	France (4)	
48	(Malaysia) Cheam June Wei	27,250	15	Malaysia (5)	
49	(India) B. Sai Praneeth	27,150	16	India (6)	
50	(Chinese Taipei) Lee Chia-hao	27,130	17	Chinese Taipei (4)	
51	(Denmark) Mads Christophersen	26,680	18	Denmark (6)	
52	(Chinese Taipei) Chi Yu-jen	26,111	19	Chinese Taipei (5)	
53	(Malaysia) Justin Hoh	25,720	20	Malaysia (5)	
Decline
43	(South Korea) Heo Kwang-hee	28,485	No	South Korea	
67	(Canada) Jason Ho-shue	22,267	No	Canada	
75	(Sweden) Felix Burestedt	20,465	No	Sweden	
118	(England) Toby Penty	12,242	No	England	
130	(Mexico) Lino Muñoz	11,140	No	Mexico	Decline on July 24
135	(Austria) Collinn Valentine Filimon	10,470	No	Austria	Not eligible
137	(Bulgaria) Daniel Nikolov	10,433	No	Bulgaria	

=== Women's singles ===
According to the phase 2 updated by BWF, the following table is the invitation results.

Players who ranked from 1 to 8, whose association could nominate 4 players.
Players who ranked from 9 to 24, whose association could nominate 3 players.
Players who ranked from 25 to 150, whose association could nominate 2 players.

Rank	Nation / Player	Points	Eligibility		Note
Qualifiers
1	(Japan) Akane Yamaguchi	102,713	1	Japan (1)	BA highest ranked
2	(South Korea) An Se-young	97,253	2	South Korea (1)	
3	(China) Chen Yufei	91,956	3	China (1)	
4	(Chinese Taipei) Tai Tzu-ying	91,745	4	Chinese Taipei (1)	
5	(China) He Bingjiao	78,804	5	China (2)	
6	(Spain) Carolina Marín	75,930	6	Spain (1)	BE highest ranked
7	(China) Wang Zhiyi	73,358	7	China (3)	
8	(Thailand) Ratchanok Intanon	69,549	8	Thailand (1)	
9	(China) Han Yue	61,110	48	China (4)	
10	(Thailand) Pornpawee Chochuwong	60,195	9	Thailand (2)	
11	(India) P. V. Sindhu	59,978	10	India (1)	
12	(Indonesia) Gregoria Mariska Tunjung	59,035	11	Indonesia (1)	
13	(Thailand) Busanan Ongbamrungphan	53,834	12	Thailand (3)	
14	(Japan) Nozomi Okuhara	51,590	13	Japan (2)	
15	(Canada) Michelle Li	50,850	14	Canada (1)	
16	(United States) Beiwen Zhang	50,265	15	United States (1)	
17	(Chinese Taipei) Hsu Wen-chi	47,872	16	Chinese Taipei (2)	
19	(Denmark) Mia Blichfeldt	46,249	17	Denmark (1)	Host nation presenter
20	(Denmark) Line Kjærsfeldt	44,514	18	Denmark (2)	
21	(Chinese Taipei) Pai Yu-po	41,370	19	Chinese Taipei (3)	
22	(South Korea) Kim Ga-eun	41,291	20	South Korea (2)	
23	(Denmark) Line Christophersen	40,929	21	Denmark (3)	
24	(Germany) Yvonne Li	40,502	22	Germany (1)	
25	(Scotland) Kirsty Gilmour	40,349	23	Scotland (1)	
32	(Singapore) Yeo Jia Min	36,158	24	Singapore (1)	
33	(Malaysia) Goh Jin Wei	35,861	25	Malaysia (1)	
34	(United States) Iris Wang	34,270	26	United States (2)	
35	(Vietnam) Nguyễn Thùy Linh	34,270	27	Vietnam (1)	
37	(Indonesia) Putri Kusuma Wardani	31,739	28	Indonesia (2)	
39	(Belgium) Lianne Tan	30,583	29	Belgium (1)	
43	(France) Qi Xuefei	28,810	30	France (1)	
44	(Spain) Clara Azurmendi	28,456	31	Spain (2)	
49	(Estonia) Kristin Kuuba	25,341	32	Estonia (1)	
50	(Malaysia) Kisona Selvaduray	25,339	33	Malaysia (2)	
52	(France) Léonice Huet	24,942	34	France (2)	
54	(Canada) Wenyu Zhang	24,663	35	Canada (2)	
58	(Turkey) Neslihan Yiğit	23,670	36	Turkey (1)	
59	(Myanmar) Thet Htar Thuzar	23,590	37	Myanmar (1)	
67	(Switzerland) Jenjira Stadelmann	18,653	38	Switzerland (1)	
68	(Ukraine) Polina Buhrova	18,444	39	Ukraine (1)	
70	(Republic of Ireland) Rachael Darragh	18,185	40	Ireland (1)	
71	(Brazil) Juliana Viana Vieira	17,879	41	Brazil (1)	
75	(Mexico) Haramara Gaitán	17,202	42	Mexico (1)	
76	(Singapore) Insyirah Khan	17,099	43	Singapore (2)	
78	(Hungary) Vivien Sándorházi	16,409	44	Hungary (1)	
79	(Peru) Inés Castillo	15,879	45	Peru (1)	
99	(Australia) Tiffany Ho	13,640	46	Australia (1)	BO highest ranked
111	(Egypt) Doha Hany	12,709	47	Egypt (1)	BCA highest ranked
Reserve
18	(China) Zhang Yiman	47,076	2	China (5)	Fulled nation quota
26	(Thailand) Lalinrat Chaiwan	40,148	3	Thailand (4)	
27	(Thailand) Supanida Katethong	39,639	4	Thailand (5)	
28	(Japan) Saena Kawakami	36,974	5	Japan (3)	
30	(Japan) Natsuki Nidaira	36,550	6	Japan (4)	
31	(Japan) Aya Ohori	36,239	7	Japan (5)	
36	(Chinese Taipei) Sung Shuo-yun	33,660	8	Chinese Taipei (4)	
38	(Japan) Riko Gunji	31,398	9	Japan (6)	
40	(India) Aakarshi Kashyap	30,141	10	India (3)	
41	(South Korea) Sim Yu-jin	29,974	11	South Korea (3)	
42	(India) Malvika Bansod	29,500	12	India (4)	
46	(United States) Lauren Lam	28,069	14	United States (3)	
47	(Denmark) Julie Dawall Jakobsen	27,699	15	Denmark (4)	
48	(India) Ashmita Chaliha	25,577	16	India (5)	
51	(Chinese Taipei) Lin Hsiang-ti	25,290	17	Chinese Taipei (5)	
53	(Japan) Hirari Mizui	24,770	18	Japan (8)	
55	(China) Gao Fangjie	23,975	19	China (6)	
56	(Indonesia) Komang Ayu Cahya Dewi	23,762	20	Indonesia (3)	
Decline
29	(India) Saina Nehwal	36,600	No	India	
45	(Japan) Sayaka Takahashi	28,343	No	Japan	Retired

=== Men's doubles ===
According to the phase 2 updated by BWF, the following table is the invitation results.

Players who ranked from 1 to 8, whose association could nominate 4 players.
Players who ranked from 9 to 24, whose association could nominate 3 players.
Players who ranked from 25 to 150, whose association could nominate 2 players.

Rank	Nation / Player	Points	Eligibility		Note
Qualifiers
1	(Indonesia) Fajar Alfian (Indonesia) Muhammad Rian Ardianto	96,664	1	Indonesia (1)	BA highest ranked
2	(Malaysia) Aaron Chia (Malaysia) Soh Wooi Yik	84,683	2	Malaysia (1)	
3	(Indonesia) Mohammad Ahsan (Indonesia) Hendra Setiawan	78,605	3	Indonesia (2)	
4	(Japan) Takuro Hoki (Japan) Yugo Kobayashi	76,120	4	Japan (1)	
5	(China) Liu Yuchen (China) Ou Xuanyi	74,792	5	China (1)	
6	(India) Satwiksairaj Rankireddy (India) Chirag Shetty	70,206	6	India (1)	
7	(China) Liang Weikeng (China) Wang Chang	67,970	7	China (2)	
8	(Malaysia) Ong Yew Sin (Malaysia) Teo Ee Yi	64,940	8	Malaysia (2)	
9	(Denmark) Kim Astrup (Denmark) Anders Skaarup Rasmussen	64,159	9	Denmark (1)	BE highest ranked
10	(Indonesia) Leo Rolly Carnando (Indonesia) Daniel Marthin	61,190	10	Indonesia (3)	
11	(South Korea) Choi Sol-gyu (South Korea) Kim Won-ho	60,591	11	South Korea (1)	
12	(China) He Jiting (China) Zhou Haodong	55,030	12	China (3)	
13	(Chinese Taipei) Lu Ching-yao (Chinese Taipei) Yang Po-han	53,776	13	Chinese Taipei (1)	
14	(Chinese Taipei) Lee Yang (Chinese Taipei) Wang Chi-lin	52,948	14	Chinese Taipei (2)	
15	(Indonesia) Muhammad Shohibul Fikri (Indonesia) Bagas Maulana	52,612	46	Indonesia (4)	Reserve 1
16	(Germany) Mark Lamsfuß (Germany) Marvin Seidel	52,338	15	Germany (1)	
17	(England) Ben Lane (England) Sean Vendy	52,068	16	England (1)	
19	(South Korea) Kang Min-hyuk (South Korea) Seo Seung-jae	48,926	17	South Korea (2)	
20	(China) Ren Xiangyu (China) Tan Qiang	47,174	47	China (4)	Reserve 2 Invited
22	(Chinese Taipei) Lee Jhe-huei (Chinese Taipei) Yang Po-hsuan	43,890	18	Chinese Taipei (3)	
23	(Scotland) Alexander Dunn (Scotland) Adam Hall	42,197	19	Scotland (1)	
24	(Japan) Akira Koga (Japan) Taichi Saito	41,557	20	Japan (2)	
25	(Denmark) Jeppe Bay (Denmark) Lasse Mølhede	40,983	21	Denmark (2)	
28	(Malaysia) Man Wei Chong (Malaysia) Tee Kai Wun	38,760	48	Malaysia (3)	Reserved 5
29	(Thailand) Supak Jomkoh (Thailand) Kittinupong Kedren	35,780	22	Thailand (1)	
31	(France) Christo Popov (France) Toma Junior Popov	34,788	23	France (1)	
32	(France) Lucas Corvée (France) Ronan Labar	34,689	24	France (2)	
39	(Scotland) Christopher Grimley (Scotland) Matthew Grimley	29,548	25	Scotland (2)	
45	(Canada) Adam Dong (Canada) Nyl Yakura	26,670	26	Canada (1)	BPA highest ranked
48	(Canada) Kevin Lee (Canada) Ty Alexander Lindeman	24,522	27	Canada (2)	
50	(Thailand) Pharanyu Kaosamaang (Thailand) Worrapol Thongsa-nga	23,390	28	Thailand (2)	
53	(Norway) Torjus Flåtten (Norway) Vegard Rikheim	22,522	29	Norway (1)	
54	(United States) Vinson Chiu (United States) Joshua Yuan	22,328	30	United States (1)	
55	(Republic of Ireland) Joshua Magee (Republic of Ireland) Paul Reynolds	22,319	31	Ireland (1)	
57	(England) Rory Easton (England) Zach Russ	21,747	32	England (2)	
58	(Czech Republic) Ondřej Král (Czech Republic) Adam Mendrek	21,728	33	Czech Republic (1)	
61	(Germany) Bjarne Geiss (Germany) Jan Colin Völker	20,916	34	Germany (2)	
68	(Philippines) Christian Bernardo (Philippines) Alvin Morada	18,370	35	Philippines (1)	
73	(Mexico) Job Castillo (Mexico) Luis Montoya	16,773	36	Mexico (1)	
81	(Guatemala) Aníbal Marroquín (Guatemala) Jonathan Solís	15,527	37	Guatemala (1)	
89	(Azerbaijan) Ade Resky Dwicahyo (Azerbaijan) Azmy Qowimuramadhoni	13,890	38	Azerbaijan (1)	
100	(Italy) Giovanni Greco (Italy) David Salutt	11,500	39	Italy (1)	
102	(Singapore) Andy Kwek (Singapore) Loh Kean Hean	11,145	40	Singapore (1)	
104	(Bulgaria) Ivan Rusev (Bulgaria) Iliyan Stoynov	10,825	41	Bulgaria (1)	
108	(Peru) José Guevara (Peru) Diego Mini	10,407	42	Peru (1)	
114	(Brazil) Fabrício Farias (Brazil) Francielton Farias	10,040	43	Brazil (1)	
117	(South Africa) Jarred Elliott (South Africa) Robert Summers	9,760	44	South Africa (1)	
149	(Australia) Kenneth Choo (Australia) Lim Ming Chuen	6,889	45	Australia (1)	BO highest ranked
Reserve
21	(Indonesia) Pramudya Kusumawardana (Indonesia) Yeremia Rambitan	45,553	3	Indonesia (5)	Fulled nation quota
26	(Indonesia) Marcus Fernaldi Gideon (Indonesia) Kevin Sanjaya Sukamuljo	40,780	4	Indonesia (6)	Fulled nation quota
30	(Chinese Taipei) Su Ching-heng (Chinese Taipei) Ye Hong-wei	35,329	6	Chinese Taipei (4)	
33	(Japan) Keiichiro Matsui (Japan) Yoshinori Takeuchi	34,581	7	Japan (3)	
35	(Japan) Ayato Endo (Japan) Yuta Takei	34,141	8	Japan (4)	
36	(Chinese Taipei) Chang Ko-chi (Chinese Taipei) Po Li-wei	33,510	9	Chinese Taipei (5)	
38	(India) Krishna Prasad Garaga (India) Vishnuvardhan Goud Panjala	31,651	10	India (3)	
40	(Chinese Taipei) Lee Fang-chih (Chinese Taipei) Lee Fang-jen	28,610	11	Chinese Taipei (6)	
41	(Denmark) Rasmus Kjær (Denmark) Frederik Søgaard	28,132	12	Denmark (3)	
42	(Chinese Taipei) Chiu Hsiang-chieh (Chinese Taipei) Yang Ming-tse	27,630	13	Chinese Taipei (7)	
43	(Indonesia) Sabar Karyaman Gutama (Indonesia) Muhammad Reza Pahlevi Isfahani	27,440	14	Indonesia (7)	
44	(Malaysia) Tan Kian Meng (Malaysia) Tan Wee Kiong	27,070	15	Malaysia (5)	
47	(Japan) Shuntaro Mezaki (Japan) Haruya Nishida	25,460	16	Japan (5)	
49	(Malaysia) Boon Xin Yuan (Malaysia) Wong Tien Ci	23,980	17	Malaysia (6)	
52	(China) Chen Boyang (China) Liu Yi	22,660	19	China (5)	
56	(Chinese Taipei) Lin Yu-chieh (Chinese Taipei) Su Li-wei	21,770	20	Chinese Taipei (8)	
Decline
18	(Malaysia) Goh Sze Fei (Malaysia) Nur Izzuddin	50,395	No	Malaysia	
27	(India) Arjun M. R. (India) Dhruv Kapila	40,578	No	India	Decline on August 9
34	(Netherlands) Ruben Jille (Netherlands) Ties van der Lecq	34,357	No	Netherlands	Declined on July 7
37	(Thailand) Chaloempon Charoenkitamorn (Thailand) Nanthakarn Yordphaisong	32,950	No	Thailand	
46	(Singapore) Terry Hee (Singapore) Loh Kean Hean	25,666	No	Singapore	
51	(Japan) Hiroki Okamura (Japan) Masayuki Onodera	23,120	No	Japan	Reserve 18
72	(Algeria) Koceila Mammeri (Algeria) Youcef Sabri Medel	17,230	No	Algeria	BCA highest ranked Declined on July 20
79	(Spain) Joan Monroy (Spain) Carlos Piris	15,625	No	Spain	
91	(Czech Republic) Jaromír Janáček (Czech Republic) Tomáš Švejda	13,460	No	Czech Republic	
93	(Hong Kong) Chow Hin Long (Hong Kong) Lui Chun Wai	12,928	No	Hong Kong	
97	(Sweden) Joel Hansson (Sweden) Melker Z-Bexell	12,078	No	Sweden	
115	(Hong Kong) Law Cheuk Him (Hong Kong) Lee Chun Hei	9,970	No	Hong Kong	
150	(Singapore) Danny Bawa Chrisnanta (Singapore) Andy Kwek	6,820	No	Singapore	

=== Women's doubles ===
According to the phase 2 updated by BWF, the following table is the invitation results.

Players who ranked from 1 to 8, whose association could nominate 4 players.
Players who ranked from 9 to 24, whose association could nominate 3 players.
Players who ranked from 25 to 150, whose association could nominate 2 players.

Rank	Nation / Player	Points	Eligibility		Note
Qualifiers
1	(China) Chen Qingchen (China) Jia Yifan	104,566	1	China (1)	BA highest ranked
2	(Japan) Nami Matsuyama (Japan) Chiharu Shida	82,543	2	Japan (1)	
3	(China) Zhang Shuxian (China) Zheng Yu	75,070	3	China (2)	
4	(Indonesia) Apriyani Rahayu (Indonesia) Siti Fadia Silva Ramadhanti	73,825	4	Indonesia (1)	
5	(South Korea) Kim So-yeong (South Korea) Kong Hee-yong	72,945	5	South Korea (1)	
6	(Japan) Yuki Fukushima (Japan) Sayaka Hirota	70,751	6	Japan (2)	
8	(Malaysia) Pearly Tan (Malaysia) Thinaah Muralitharan	68,280	7	Malaysia (1)	
9	(Japan) Mayu Matsumoto (Japan) Wakana Nagahara	67,818	8	Japan (3)	
10	(Thailand) Jongkolphan Kititharakul (Thailand) Rawinda Prajongjai	67,437	9	Thailand (1)	
11	(Thailand) Benyapa Aimsaard (Thailand) Nuntakarn Aimsaard	61,447	10	Thailand (2)	
12	(South Korea) Baek Ha-na (South Korea) Lee So-hee	60,925	11	South Korea (2)	
15	(Bulgaria) Gabriela Stoeva (Bulgaria) Stefani Stoeva	53,274	12	Bulgaria (1)	BE highest ranked
16	(Denmark) Maiken Fruergaard (Denmark) Sara Thygesen	46,915	13	Denmark (1)	Host nation presenter
17	(Japan) Rin Iwanaga (Japan) Kie Nakanishi	45,000	44	Japan (4)	Reserve 2
18	(Indonesia) Febriana Dwipuji Kusuma (Indonesia) Amallia Cahaya Pratiwi	44,460	14	Indonesia (2)	
19	(India) Gayatri Gopichand (India) Treesa Jolly	43,501	15	India (1)	
21	(Malaysia) Vivian Hoo (Malaysia) Lim Chiew Sien	40,720	16	Malaysia (2)	
22	(Singapore) Jin Yujia (Singapore) Crystal Wong	40,076	17	Singapore (1)	
26	(Chinese Taipei) Lee Chia-hsin (Chinese Taipei) Teng Chun-hsun	38,854	18	Chinese Taipei (1)	
27	(France) Margot Lambert (France) Anne Tran	37,814	19	France (1)	
28	(Germany) Linda Efler (Germany) Isabel Lohau	36,539	20	Germany (1)	
29	(England) Chloe Birch (England) Lauren Smith	36,057	21	England (1)	
30	(Netherlands) Debora Jille (Netherlands) Cheryl Seinen	35,341	22	Netherlands (1)	
31	(Hong Kong) Yeung Nga Ting (Hong Kong) Yeung Pui Lam	35,320	23	Hong Kong (1)	
33	(Canada) Catherine Choi (Canada) Josephine Wu	32,952	24	Canada (1)	BPA highest rank
34	(Indonesia) Lanny Tria Mayasari (Indonesia) Ribka Sugiarto	32,687	45	Indonesia (3)	Reserve 7
35	(Scotland) Julie MacPherson (Scotland) Ciara Torrance	32,569	25	Scotland (1)	
36	(China) Li Wenmei (China) Liu Xuanxuan	31,880	46	China (3)	Reserve 8
37	(Malaysia) Anna Cheong (Malaysia) Teoh Mei Xing	31,875	47	Malaysia (3)	Reserve 9
39	(India) Ashwini Bhat (India) Shika Gautam	29,765	26	India (2)	
41	(Chinese Taipei) Hsu Ya-ching (Chinese Taipei) Lin Wan-ching	29,161	27	Chinese Taipei (2)	
42	(Chinese Taipei) Chang Ching-hui (Chinese Taipei) Yang Ching-tun	29,132	48	Chinese Taipei (3)	Reserve 10
43	(Ukraine) Mariia Stoliarenko (Ukraine) Yelyzaveta Zharka	29,117	28	Ukraine (1)	
46	(Brazil) Jaqueline Lima (Brazil) Sâmia Lima	26,737	29	Brazil (1)	
47	(United States) Annie Xu (United States) Kerry Xu	26,454	30	United States (1)	
49	(Germany) Stine Küspert (Germany) Emma Moszczynski	25,479	31	Germany (2)	
50	(United States) Francesca Corbett (United States) Allison Lee	25,426	32	United States (2)	
59	(Estonia) Kati-Kreet Marran (Estonia) Helina Rüütel	21,339	33	Estonia (1)	
67	(Sweden) Moa Sjöö (Sweden) Tilda Sjöö	17,854	34	Sweden (1)	
72	(Netherlands) Kirsten de Wit (Netherlands) Alyssa Tirtosentono	16,020	35	Netherlands (2)	
75	(Peru) Inés Castillo (Peru) Paula la Torre Regal	15,913	36	Peru (1)	
78	(England) Abbygael Harris (England) Annie Lado	15,372	37	England (2)	
80	(Austria) Serena Au Yeong (Austria) Katharina Hochmeir	14,377	38	Austria (1)	
81	(South Africa) Amy Ackerman (South Africa) Deidre Laurens	14,140	39	South Africa (1)	BCA highest ranked
84	(Maldives) Aminatha Nabeeha Abdul Razzaq (Maldives) Fathimath Nabaaha Abdul Razzaq	13,680	40	Maldives (1)	
85	(Mauritius) Lorna Bodha (Mauritius) Kobita Dookhee	13,438	41	Mauritius (1)	
86	(Hong Kong) Lui Lok Lok (Hong Kong) Ng Wing Yung	13,300	42	Hong Kong (2)	
145	(Australia) Kaitlyn Ea (Australia) Gronya Somerville	6,931	43	Australia (1)	BO highest ranked
Reserve
23	(Japan) Rui Hirokami (Japan) Yuna Kato	39,930	4	Japan (5)	Fulled nation quota
25	(Japan) Rena Miyaura (Japan) Ayako Sakuramoto	39,351	5	Japan (6)	Fulled nation quota
48	(Indonesia) Meilysa Trias Puspita Sari (Indonesia) Rachel Allessya Rose	25,760	11	Indonesia (4)	
51	(China) Li Yijing (China) Luo Xumin	24,982	12	China (5)	
52	(Chinese Taipei) Hsieh Pei-shan (Chinese Taipei) Tseng Yu-chi	24,350	13	Chinese Taipei (4)	
54	(Chinese Taipei) Sung Shuo-yun (Chinese Taipei) Yuu Chien-hui	22,910	14	Chinese Taipei (5)	
55	(Chinese Taipei) Hu Ling-fang (Chinese Taipei) Lin Xiao-min	21,850	15	Chinese Taipei (6)	
57	(China) Liu Shengshu (China) Tan Ning	21,534	16	China (6)	
58	(India) Simran Singhi (India) Ritika Thaker	21,407	17	India (3)	
61	(United States) Paula Lynn Cao Hok (United States) Lauren Lam	19,650	18	United States (3)	
63	(India) Haritha Manazhiyil (India) Ashna Roy	19,240	20	India (4)	
Decline
7	(South Korea) Jeong Na-eun (South Korea) Kim Hye-jeong	69,117	No	South Korea	Withdrew on August 9
13	(South Korea) Lee So-hee (South Korea) Shin Seung-chan	57,910	No	South Korea	Reserve 1
14	(China) Du Yue (China) Li Wenmei	54,625	No	China	
20	(South Korea) Baek Ha-na (South Korea) Lee Yu-lim	41,119	No	South Korea	Reserve 3
24	(Thailand) Supissara Paewsampran (Thailand) Puttita Supajirakul	39,800	No	Thailand	Declined on June 6
32	(China) Liu Xuanxuan (China) Xia Yuting	34,200	No	China	Reserve 6 Declined on May 25
38	(Canada) Rachel Honderich (Canada) Kristen Tsai	31,715	No	Canada	
40	(Hong Kong) Ng Tsz Yau (Hong Kong) Tsang Hiu Yan	29,320	No	Hong Kong	Declined on May 18
44	(United States) Srivedya Gurazada (United States) Ishika Jaiswal	28,440	No	United States	
45	(Spain) Clara Azurmendi (Spain) Beatriz Corrales	26,857	No	Spain	
53	(Italy) Martina Corsini (Italy) Judith Mair	23,457	No	Italy	Decline on July 20
56	(Denmark) Christine Busch (Denmark) Amalie Schulz	21,750	No	Denmark	
60	(Republic of Ireland) Kate Frost (Republic of Ireland) Moya Ryan	20,596	No	Ireland	Decline on August 6
62	(Japan) Sayaka Hobara (Japan) Hinata Suzuki	19,400	No	Japan	
70	(Poland) Dominika Kwaśnik (Poland) Kornelia Marczak	16,677	No	Poland	Decline on July 31
73	(France) Flavie Vallet (France) Emilie Vercelot	15,945	No	France	
110	(Australia) Chen Hsuan-yu (Australia) Gronya Somerville	10,699	No	Australia	

=== Mixed doubles ===
According to the phase 2 updated by BWF, the following table is the invitation results.

Players who ranked from 1 to 8, whose association could nominate 4 players.
Players who ranked from 9 to 24, whose association could nominate 3 players.
Players who ranked from 25 to 150, whose association could nominate 2 players.

Rank	Nation / Player	Points	Eligibility		Note
Qualifiers
1	(China) Zheng Siwei (China) Huang Yaqiong	115,200	1	China (1)	BA highest ranked
2	(Japan) Yuta Watanabe (Japan) Arisa Higashino	87,005	2	Japan (1)	
4	(Thailand) Dechapol Puavaranukroh (Thailand) Sapsiree Taerattanachai	76,390	3	Thailand (1)	
5	(South Korea) Seo Seung-jae (South Korea) Chae Yoo-jung	66,250	4	South Korea (1)	
6	(France) Thom Gicquel (France) Delphine Delrue	66,032	5	France (1)	BE highest ranked
7	(China) Feng Yanzhe (China) Huang Dongping	60,139	6	China (2)	
8	(Malaysia) Goh Soon Huat (Malaysia) Shevon Jemie Lai	58,590	7	Malaysia (1)	
9	(Netherlands) Robin Tabeling (Netherlands) Selena Piek	58,173	8	Netherlands (1)	
10	(South Korea) Kim Won-ho (South Korea) Jeong Na-eun	56,493	9	South Korea (2)	
11	(Indonesia) Rehan Naufal Kusharjanto (Indonesia) Lisa Ayu Kusumawati	56,380	10	Indonesia (1)	
12	(Germany) Mark Lamsfuß (Germany) Isabel Lohau	55,858	11	Germany (1)	
13	(Malaysia) Tan Kian Meng (Malaysia) Lai Pei Jing	54,434	12	Malaysia (2)	
14	(Indonesia) Rinov Rivaldy (Indonesia) Pitha Haningtyas Mentari	54,208	13	Indonesia (2)	
15	(Thailand) Supak Jomkoh (Thailand) Supissara Paewsampran	53,050	14	Thailand (2)	
16	(Japan) Kyohei Yamashita (Japan) Naru Shinoya	52,210	15	Japan (2)	
17	(Denmark) Mathias Christiansen (Denmark) Alexandra Bøje	51,360	16	Denmark (1)	
18	(Japan) Yuki Kaneko (Japan) Misaki Matsutomo	50,880	17	Japan (3)	
19	(Indonesia) Dejan Ferdinansyah (Indonesia) Gloria Emanuelle Widjaja	47,460	18	Indonesia (3)	
20	(Hong Kong) Tang Chun Man (Hong Kong) Tse Ying Suet	46,754	19	Hong Kong (1)	
21	(China) Jiang Zhenbang (China) Wei Yaxin	45,707	20	China (3)	
22	(Malaysia) Chen Tang Jie (Malaysia) Toh Ee Wei	44,513	21	Malaysia (3)	
23	(Chinese Taipei) Ye Hong-wei (Chinese Taipei) Lee Chia-hsin	43,072	22	Chinese Taipei (1)	
24	(Hong Kong) Lee Chun Hei (Hong Kong) Ng Tsz Yau	42,040	23	Hong Kong (2)	
25	(Singapore) Terry Hee (Singapore) Jessica Tan	40,796	24	Singapore (1)	
26	(Japan) Hiroki Midorikawa (Japan) Natsu Saito	39,945	48	Japan (4)	Reserve 1 Invited
28	(England) Gregory Mairs (England) Jenny Moore	35,554	25	England (1)	
30	(Chinese Taipei) Yang Po-hsuan (Chinese Taipei) Hu Ling-fang	34,270	26	Chinese Taipei (2)	
32	(Denmark) Mathias Thyrri (Denmark) Amalie Magelund	33,761	27	Denmark (2)	
34	(Scotland) Adam Hall (Scotland) Julie MacPherson	32,864	28	Scotland (1)	
36	(Canada) Ty Alexander Lindeman (Canada) Josephine Wu	31,746	29	Canada (1)	
37	(Germany) Jones Ralfy Jansen (Germany) Linda Efler	31,564	30	Germany (2)	
38	(United States) Vinson Chiu (United States) Jennie Gai	30,612	31	United States (1)	
44	(Brazil) Fabrício Farias (Brazil) Jaqueline Lima	26,911	32	Brazil (1)	
48	(India) Rohan Kapoor (India) N. Sikki Reddy	24,200	33	India (1)	
56	(England) Marcus Ellis (England) Lauren Smith	20,516	34	England (2)	
58	(Egypt) Adham Hatem Elgamal (Egypt) Doha Hany	20,156	35	Egypt (1)	
63	(Guatemala) Jonathan Solís (Guatemala) Diana Corleto	18,970	36	Guatemala (1)	
64	(Serbia) Mihajlo Tomić (Serbia) Anđela Vitman	18,760	37	Serbia (1)	
67	(Brazil) Davi Silva (Brazil) Sânia Lima	18,420	38	Brazil (2)	
70	(India) Venkat Gaurav Prasad (India) Juhi Dewangan	17,400	39	India (2)	
73	(Australia) Kenneth Choo (Australia) Gronya Somerville	15,888	40	Australia (1)	BO highest ranked
75	(Netherlands) Ties van der Lecq (Netherlands) Debora Jille	15,650	41	Netherlands (2)	
76	(Israel) Misha Zilberman (Israel) Svetlana Zilberman	15,320	42	Israel (1)	
79	(Maldives) Hussein Shaheed (Maldives) Fathimath Nabaaha Abdul Razzaq	14,880	43	Maldives (1)	
81	(Canada) Nyl Yakura (Canada) Crystal Lai	14,760	44	Canada (2)	
82	(Austria) Philip Birker (Austria) Katharina Hochmeir	14,740	45	Austria (1)	
86	(Bulgaria) Iliyan Stoynov (Bulgaria) Hristomira Popovska	13,170	46	Bulgaria (1)	
87	(Philippines) Alvin Morada (Philippines) Alyssa Leonardo	13,010	47	Philippines (1)	
Reserve
27	(Indonesia) Zachariah Josiahno Sumanti (Indonesia) Hediana Julimarbela	35,940	2	Indonesia (4)	
31	(Chinese Taipei) Chang Ko-chi (Chinese Taipei) Lee Chih-chen	33,990	3	Chinese Taipei (3)	
35	(Malaysia) Chan Peng Soon (Malaysia) Cheah Yee See	32,270	5	Malaysia (4)	
39	(Indonesia) Praveen Jordan (Indonesia) Melati Daeva Oktavianti	30,590	6	Indonesia (5)	
40	(Denmark) Mikkel Mikkelsen (Denmark) Rikke Søby Hansen	29,140	7	Denmark (3)	
41	(Chinese Taipei) Lee Jhe-huei (Chinese Taipei) Hsu Ya-ching	27,800	8	Chinese Taipei (4)	
42	(Indonesia) Amri Syahnawi (Indonesia) Winny Oktavina Kandow	27,370	9	Indonesia (6)	
43	(Indonesia) Akbar Bintang Cahyono (Indonesia) Marsheilla Gischa Islami	27,150	10	Indonesia (7)	
45	(China) Guo Xinwa (China) Zhang Shuxian	25,480	11	China (4)	
46	(Indonesia) Jafar Hidayatullah (Indonesia) Aisyah Salsabila Putri Pranata	25,200	12	Indonesia (8)	
47	(Thailand) Ruttanapal Oupthong (Thailand) Jhenicha Sudhaipraparat	24,840	13	Thailand (3)	
49	(Malaysia) Hoo Pang Ron (Malaysia) Teoh Mei Xing	23,750	14	Malaysia (5)	
51	(China) Cheng Xing (China) Chen Fanghui	22,480	15	China (5)	
52	(Chinese Taipei) Chiu Hsiang-chieh (Chinese Taipei) Lin Xiao-min	22,470	16	Chinese Taipei (5)	
54	(Denmark) Jesper Toft (Denmark) Clara Graversen	22,210	17	Denmark (4)	
55	(Indonesia) Adnan Maulana (Indonesia) Nita Violina Marwah	22,010	18	Indonesia (9)	
57	(Denmark) Mads Vestergaard (Denmark) Christine Busch	20,230	19	Denmark (5)	
Decline
3	(China) Wang Yilyu (China) Huang Dongping	79,310	No	China	
29	(India) Ishaan Bhatnagar (India) Tanisha Crasto	34,638	No	India	
33	(Malaysia) Hoo Pang Ron (Malaysia) Toh Ee Wei	33,180	No	Malaysia	Reserve 4
50	(England) Callum Hemming (England) Jessica Pugh	23,390	No	England	
53	(Algeria) Koceila Mammeri (Algeria) Tanina Mammeri	22,399	No	Algeria	BCA highest ranked Declined on July 20
59	(Japan) Sumiya Nihei (Japan) Minami Asakura	20,050	No	Japan	Reserve 20
66	(France) Lucas Corvée (France) Sharone Bauer	18,700	No	France	
71	(France) William Villeger (France) Anne Tran	17,290	No	France	
