= Nethania Irawan =

Indonesian badminton player (born 2004)

Personal information
- Born: 4 February 2004 (age 22) Surabaya, East Java, Indonesia

Sport
- Country: Indonesia
- Sport: Badminton
- Handedness: Right

Women's doubles
- Highest ranking: 280 (WD with Febi Setianingrum) (13 September 2022)
- Current ranking: 280 (WD with Febi Setianingrum) (13 September 2022)
- BWF profile

Nethania Irawan (born 4 February 2004) is an Indonesian badminton player.

== Achievements ==
=== BWF International Challenge/Series (2 title) ===
Women's doubles
| Year | Tournament | Partner | Opponent | Score | Result | Ref. |
|---|---|---|---|---|---|---|
| 2022 | Lithuanian International | (Indonesia) Febi Setianingrum | (Indonesia) Sofy Al Mushira Asharunnisa (Indonesia) Ridya Aulia Fatasya | 21–10, 23–21 | (gold) Winner | |
| 2023 | Kazakhstan Future Series | (Indonesia) Fuyu Iwasaki | (India) Rutaparna Panda (India) Swetaparna Panda | 21–13, 21–15 | (gold) Winner | |

BWF International Challenge tournament
BWF International Series tournament
BWF Future Series tournament
