= Alvin Morada =

Filipino badminton player (born 1997)

Personal information
- Born: Alvin Nitura Morada; 12 April 1997 (age 29) Quezon City, Philippines
- Height: 1.75 m (5 ft 9 in)

Sport
- Country: Philippines
- Sport: Badminton
- Handedness: Right
- Coached by: Rosman Razak

Men's & mixed doubles
- Highest ranking: 46 (MD with Christian Bernardo, 4 July 2023); 61 (XD with Alyssa Leonardo, 25 July 2023)
- BWF profile

Alvin Nitura Morada (born 12 April 1997) is a Filipino badminton player. He was selected for the Filipino badminton squad that competed in the 2020 Badminton Asia Team Championships.

== Career ==
In 2015, Morada and his partner Aries Delos Santos were runners-up at the 2015 Iran Fajr International. He was also runner-up at the 2019 Sydney International with Peter Gabriel Magnaye.

In 2022, under the coach of Rosman Razak, Morada was able to compete in two categories, in the men's and mixed doubles. He won two titles in both men's doubles and mixed doubles at the 2022 Cameroon and also Benin International.

In December 2025, Morada competed at the SEA Games in Thailand.

== Achievements ==
=== BWF International Challenge/Series (6 titles, 5 runners-up) ===
Men's doubles
Year	Tournament	Partner	Opponent	Score	Result	Ref.
2015	Iran Fajr International	(Philippines) Aries Delos Santos	(Malaysia) Tai An Khang (Malaysia) Yew Hong Kheng	12–21, 21–18, 16–21	(silver) Runner-up	
2019	Sydney International	(Philippines) Peter Gabriel Magnaye	(Chinese Taipei) Chen Xin-yuan (Chinese Taipei) Lin Yu-chieh	21–9, 11–21, 15–21	(silver) Runner-up	
2022	Cameroon International	(Philippines) Christian Bernardo	(India) Dhruv Rawat (India) Chirag Sen	21–12, 21–13	(gold) Winner	
2022	Benin International	(Philippines) Christian Bernardo	(Nigeria) Saddam Sidi Rufai (Nigeria) Khalil Safana Shamsuddeen	21–9, 21–12	(gold) Winner	
2022	Vietnam International	(Philippines) Christian Bernardo	(China) Chen Boyang (China) Liu Yi	17–21, 23–25	(silver) Runner-up	
2022	Bangladesh International	(Philippines) Christian Bernardo	(Thailand) Pharanyu Kaosamaang (Thailand) Worrapol Thongsa-Nga	21–18, 10–21, 19–21	(silver) Runner-up	
2023	Iran Fajr International	(Philippines) Christian Bernardo	(Indonesia) Raymond Indra (Indonesia) Daniel Edgar Marvino	21–16, 21–17	(gold) Winner	
2024 (I)	Bahrain International	(Philippines) Christian Bernardo	(Philippines) Solomon Junior Padiz (Philippines) Julius Villabrille	14–21, 21–15, 26–28	(silver) Runner-up	
2024 (II)	Bahrain International	(Philippines) Christian Bernardo	(India) Vimalraj Annadurai (India) Mauryan Kathiravan	21–14, 21–15	(gold) Winner	

Mixed doubles
Year	Tournament	Partner	Opponent	Score	Result	Ref.
2022	Cameroon International	(Philippines) Alyssa Leonardo	(India) Sathish Karunakaran (India) Aadya Variyath	21–19, 18–21, 22–20	(gold) Winner	
2022	Benin International	(Philippines) Alyssa Leonardo	(Philippines) Christian Bernardo (Philippines) Thea Pomar	21–13, 18–21, 21–17	(gold) Winner	

BWF International Challenge tournament
BWF International Series tournament
BWF Future Series tournament

=== BWF Junior International (2 titles, 1 runners-up) ===
Boys' doubles
Year	Tournament	Partner	Opponent	Score	Result
2015	Australian Junior International	(Philippines) Christian Bernardo	(Japan) Kenya Mitsuhashi (Japan) Koki Watanabe	21–16, 17–21, 16–21	(silver) Runner-up
2015	Singapore Junior International	(Philippines) Christian Bernardo	(Malaysia) Mohamad Jojohanif Saha (Malaysia) Wong Yuen Jia	21–12, 21–11	(gold) Winner

Mixed doubles
Year	Tournament	Partner	Opponent	Score	Result
2015	Australian Junior International	(Philippines) Alyssa Leonardo	(Philippines) Christian Bernardo (Philippines) Eleanor Inlayo	21–19, 21–17	(gold) Winner

BWF Junior International Grand Prix tournament
BWF Junior International Challenge tournament
BWF Junior International Series tournament
BWF Junior Future Series tournament
