= Alyssa Leonardo =

Filipino badminton player

Personal information
- Born: Alyssa Ysabel Leonardo; 15 September 1997 (age 29) Meycauayan, Bulacan, Philippines

Sport
- Country: Philippines
- Sport: Badminton
- Handedness: Right

Women's & mixed doubles
- Highest ranking: 94 (WD with Thea Pomar, 13 June 2023); 61 (XD with Alvin Morada, 25 July 2023)
- BWF profile
Medal record
Women's badminton
Representing Philippines
SEA Games
Bronze medal – third place	2023 Cambodia	Women's team

Alyssa Ysabel Leonardo (born 15 September 1997) is a Filipino badminton player.

== Career ==
Leonardo started to enjoy badminton when she was a child by played with others and watched her parents play. At the age of 8, she went from playing for fun to competing in a local tournament. After graduated from the IUF Academy of Bulacan, Leonardo then educated sports management in the De La Salle University, and also taking part in the La Salle badminton team to compete in the national event.

In 2017, Leonardo made her debut with Filipino team at the SEA Games.

In 2022, under the coach of Rosman Razak, Leonardo won her first senior international title in the mixed doubles at the Cameroon International. In the next tournament in Benin, she claimed two titles in the mixed doubles with Alvin Morada and in the women's doubles with Thea Pomar.

In 2023, Leonardo participated in the SEA Games, and was part of the team that beat strong country Malaysia in the women's team quarter-finals, and led the team advanced to the semi-finals.

== Achievements ==
=== BWF International Challenge/Series (3 titles) ===
Women's doubles
Year	Tournament	Partner	Opponent	Score	Result	Ref.
2022	Benin International	(Philippines) Thea Pomar	(Egypt) Jana Abdelkader (Egypt) Nour Ahmed Youssri	21–13, 21–7	(gold) Winner	

Mixed doubles
Year	Tournament	Partner	Opponent	Score	Result	Ref.
2022	Cameroon International	(Philippines) Alvin Morada	(India) Sathish Karunakaran (India) Aadya Variyath	21–19, 18–21, 22–20	(gold) Winner	
2022	Benin International	(Philippines) Alvin Morada	(Philippines) Christian Bernardo (Philippines) Thea Pomar	21–13, 18–21, 21–17	(gold) Winner	

BWF International Challenge tournament
BWF International Series tournament
BWF Future Series tournament

=== BWF Junior International (3 titles) ===
Girls' doubles
Year	Tournament	Partner	Opponent	Score	Result
2015	Australian Junior International	(Philippines) Eleanor Inlayo	(Australia) Joy Lai (Australia) Alice Wu	21–10, 21–15	(gold) Winner
2015	Singapore Youth International	(Philippines) Thea Pomar	(Philippines) Geva de Vera (Philippines) Alyssa Geverjuan	21–14, 21–14	(gold) Winner

Mixed doubles
Year	Tournament	Partner	Opponent	Score	Result
2015	Australian Junior International	(Philippines) Alvin Morada	(Philippines) Christian Bernardo (Philippines) Eleanor Inlayo	21–19, 21–17	(gold) Winner

BWF Junior International Grand Prix tournament
BWF Junior International Challenge tournament
BWF Junior International Series tournament
BWF Junior Future Series tournament
