= Christian Bernardo =

Filipino badminton player

Personal information
- Born: 25 July 1998 (age 28) Bustos, Bulacan, Philippines

Sport
- Country: Philippines
- Sport: Badminton
- Handedness: Right
- Coached by: Rosman Razak

Men's & mixed doubles
- Highest ranking: 46 (MD with Alvin Morada, 4 July 2023); 111 (XD with Thea Pomar, 6 June 2023)
- BWF profile

Christian Bernardo (born 25 July 1998) is a Filipino badminton player.

== Career ==
In his junior career, he partnered with Alvin Morada and entered the finals of the 2015 Victor Australian Junior International. They also won the boys' doubles title at the Singapore Youth International Series in 2015. He also played mixed doubles with Eleanor Inlayo and were runners-up at the Victor Australian Junior International.

In 2022, under the coach of Rosman Razak, Bernardo returned to badminton and reestablished his partnership with Morada. Bernardo and Morada went onto win the 2022 Cameroon and also Benin International. They also finished as runners-up at the Vietnam International Series and the Bangladesh International. The duo also broke into the top 100 of the BWF World Ranking on the end of the 2022 BWF season.

In December 2025, Bernardo competed at the SEA Games in Thailand.

== Achievements ==
=== BWF International Challenge/Series (4 titles, 4 runners-up) ===
Men's doubles
Year	Tournament	Partner	Opponent	Score	Result	Ref.
2022	Cameroon International	(Philippines) Alvin Morada	(India) Dhruv Rawat (India) Chirag Sen	21–12, 21–13	(gold) Winner	
2022	Benin International	(Philippines) Alvin Morada	(Nigeria) Saddam Sidi Rufai (Nigeria) Khalil Safana Shamsuddeen	21–9, 21–12	(gold) Winner	
2022	Vietnam International	(Philippines) Alvin Morada	(China) Chen Boyang (China) Liu Yi	17–21, 23–25	(silver) Runner-up	
2022	Bangladesh International	(Philippines) Alvin Morada	(Thailand) Pharanyu Kaosamaang (Thailand) Worrapol Thongsa-Nga	21–18, 10–21, 19–21	(silver) Runner-up	
2023	Iran Fajr International	(Philippines) Alvin Morada	(Indonesia) Raymond Indra (Indonesia) Daniel Edgar Marvino	21–16, 21–17	(gold) Winner	
2024 (I)	Bahrain International	(Philippines) Alvin Morada	(Philippines) Solomon Junior Padiz (Philippines) Julius Villabrille	14–21, 21–15, 26–28	(silver) Runner-up	
2024 (II)	Bahrain International	(Philippines) Alvin Morada	(India) Vimalraj Annadurai (India) Mauryan Kathiravan	21–14, 21–15	(gold) Winner	

Mixed doubles
Year	Tournament	Partner	Opponent	Score	Result	Ref.
2022	Benin International	(Philippines) Thea Pomar	(Philippines) Alvin Morada (Philippines) Alyssa Leonardo	13–21, 21–18, 17–21	(silver) Runner-up	

BWF International Challenge tournament
BWF International Series tournament
BWF Future Series tournament

=== BWF Junior International (1 title, 2 runners-up) ===
Boys' doubles
Year	Tournament	Partner	Opponent	Score	Result
2015	Australian Junior International	(Philippines) Alvin Morada	(Japan) Kenya Mitsuhashi (Japan) Koki Watanabe	21–16, 17–21, 16–21	(silver) Runner-up
2015	Singapore Junior International	(Philippines) Alvin Morada	(Malaysia) Mohamad Jojohanif Saha (Malaysia) Wong Yuen Jia	21–12, 21–11	(gold) Winner

Mixed doubles
Year	Tournament	Partner	Opponent	Score	Result
2015	Australian Junior International	(Philippines) Eleanor Inlayo	(Philippines) Alvin Morada (Philippines) Alyssa Leonardo	19–21, 17–21	(silver) Runner-up

BWF Junior International Grand Prix tournament
BWF Junior International Challenge tournament
BWF Junior International Series tournament
BWF Junior Future Series tournament
