= 2022 BWF World Tour =

Tournament details
- Dates: 11 January – 11 December
- Edition: 5th

The 2022 BWF World Tour (officially known as 2022 HSBC BWF World Tour for sponsorship reasons) was the fifth season of the BWF World Tour of badminton, a circuit of 26 tournaments which led up to the World Tour Finals tournament. The 27 tournaments were divided into five levels: Level 1 was the said World Tour Finals, Level 2 called Super 1000 (three tournaments), Level 3 called Super 750 (five tournaments), Level 4 called Super 500 (seven tournaments) and Level 5 called Super 300 (11 tournaments). Each of these tournaments offers different ranking points and prize money. The highest points and prize pool were offered at the Super 1000 level (including the World Tour Finals).

One other category of tournament, the BWF Tour Super 100 (level 6), also offered BWF World Tour ranking points. It was an important part of the pathway and entry point for players into the BWF World Tour tournaments. When the six Level 6 grade tournaments of the BWF Tour Super 100 were included, the complete tour consisted of 33 tournaments.

== Results ==
Below is the schedule released by the Badminton World Federation:

=== Key ===
World Tour Finals
Super 1000
Super 750
Super 500
Super 300
Super 100

=== Winners ===
Tour	Report	Men's singles	Women's singles	Men's doubles	Women's doubles	Mixed doubles
World Tour Finals
BWF World Tour Finals	Report	(Denmark) Viktor Axelsen	(Japan) Akane Yamaguchi	(China) Liu Yuchen (China) Ou Xuanyi	(China) Chen Qingchen (China) Jia Yifan	(China) Zheng Siwei (China) Huang Yaqiong
Super 1000
All England Open	Report	(Denmark) Viktor Axelsen	(Japan) Akane Yamaguchi	(Indonesia) Muhammad Shohibul Fikri (Indonesia) Bagas Maulana	(Japan) Nami Matsuyama (Japan) Chiharu Shida	(Japan) Yuta Watanabe (Japan) Arisa Higashino
Indonesia Open	Report	(Denmark) Viktor Axelsen	(Chinese Taipei) Tai Tzu-ying	(China) Liu Yuchen (China) Ou Xuanyi	(Japan) Nami Matsuyama (Japan) Chiharu Shida	(China) Zheng Siwei (China) Huang Yaqiong
China Open	Report	Cancelled				
Super 750
Malaysia Open	Report	(Denmark) Viktor Axelsen	(Thailand) Ratchanok Intanon	(Japan) Takuro Hoki (Japan) Yugo Kobayashi	(Indonesia) Apriyani Rahayu (Indonesia) Siti Fadia Silva Ramadhanti	(China) Zheng Siwei (China) Huang Yaqiong
Japan Open	Report	(Japan) Kenta Nishimoto	(Japan) Akane Yamaguchi	(China) Liang Weikeng (China) Wang Chang	(South Korea) Jeong Na-eun (South Korea) Kim Hye-jeong	(Thailand) Dechapol Puavaranukroh (Thailand) Sapsiree Taerattanachai
Denmark Open	Report	(China) Shi Yuqi	(China) He Bingjiao	(Indonesia) Fajar Alfian (Indonesia) Muhammad Rian Ardianto	(China) Chen Qingchen (China) Jia Yifan	(China) Zheng Siwei (China) Huang Yaqiong
French Open	Report	(Denmark) Viktor Axelsen	(China) He Bingjiao	(India) Satwiksairaj Rankireddy (India) Chirag Shetty	(Malaysia) Pearly Tan (Malaysia) Thinaah Muralitharan	(China) Zheng Siwei (China) Huang Yaqiong
Fuzhou China Open	Report	Cancelled				
Super 500
India Open	Report	(India) Lakshya Sen	(Thailand) Busanan Ongbamrungphan	(India) Satwiksairaj Rankireddy (India) Chirag Shetty	(Thailand) Benyapa Aimsaard (Thailand) Nuntakarn Aimsaard	(Singapore) Terry Hee (Singapore) Tan Wei Han
Korea Open	Report	(China) Weng Hongyang	(South Korea) An Se-young	(South Korea) Kang Min-hyuk (South Korea) Seo Seung-jae	(South Korea) Jeong Na-eun (South Korea) Kim Hye-jeong	(Malaysia) Tan Kian Meng (Malaysia) Lai Pei Jing
Thailand Open	Report	(Malaysia) Lee Zii Jia	(Chinese Taipei) Tai Tzu-ying	(Japan) Takuro Hoki (Japan) Yugo Kobayashi	(Japan) Nami Matsuyama (Japan) Chiharu Shida	(China) Zheng Siwei (China) Huang Yaqiong
Indonesia Masters	Report	(Denmark) Viktor Axelsen	(China) Chen Yufei	(Indonesia) Fajar Alfian (Indonesia) Muhammad Rian Ardianto	(China) Chen Qingchen (China) Jia Yifan	(China) Zheng Siwei (China) Huang Yaqiong
Malaysia Masters	Report	(Indonesia) Chico Aura Dwi Wardoyo	(South Korea) An Se-young	(Indonesia) Fajar Alfian (Indonesia) Muhammad Rian Ardianto	(China) Chen Qingchen (China) Jia Yifan	(China) Zheng Siwei (China) Huang Yaqiong
Singapore Open	Report	(Indonesia) Anthony Sinisuka Ginting	(India) P. V. Sindhu	(Indonesia) Leo Rolly Carnando (Indonesia) Daniel Marthin	(Indonesia) Apriyani Rahayu (Indonesia) Siti Fadia Silva Ramadhanti	(Thailand) Dechapol Puavaranukroh (Thailand) Sapsiree Taerattanachai
Hong Kong Open	Report	Cancelled				
Super 300
Syed Modi International	Report	Not awarded	(India) P. V. Sindhu	(Malaysia) Man Wei Chong (Malaysia) Tee Kai Wun	(Malaysia) Anna Cheong (Malaysia) Teoh Mei Xing	(India) Ishaan Bhatnagar (India) Tanisha Crasto
Spain Masters	Report	Cancelled				
German Open	Report	(Thailand) Kunlavut Vitidsarn	(China) He Bingjiao	(Malaysia) Goh Sze Fei (Malaysia) Nur Izzuddin	(China) Chen Qingchen (China) Jia Yifan	(Thailand) Dechapol Puavaranukroh (Thailand) Sapsiree Taerattanachai
Swiss Open	Report	(Indonesia) Jonatan Christie	(India) P. V. Sindhu	(Indonesia) Fajar Alfian (Indonesia) Muhammad Rian Ardianto	(Bulgaria) Gabriela Stoeva (Bulgaria) Stefani Stoeva	(Germany) Mark Lamsfuß (Germany) Isabel Lohau
Korea Masters	Report	(South Korea) Jeon Hyeok-jin	(China) He Bingjiao	(South Korea) Kim Gi-jung (South Korea) Kim Sa-rang	(South Korea) Kim So-yeong (South Korea) Kong Hee-yong	(China) Wang Yilyu (China) Huang Dongping
Taipei Open	Report	(Chinese Taipei) Chou Tien-chen	(Chinese Taipei) Tai Tzu-ying	(Malaysia) Man Wei Chong (Malaysia) Tee Kai Wun	(Hong Kong) Ng Tsz Yau (Hong Kong) Tsang Hiu Yan	(Hong Kong) Lee Chun Hei (Hong Kong) Ng Tsz Yau
U.S. Open	Report	Cancelled				
Macau Open	Report	Cancelled				
Hylo Open	Report	(Indonesia) Anthony Sinisuka Ginting	(China) Han Yue	(Chinese Taipei) Lu Ching-yao (Chinese Taipei) Yang Po-han	(Thailand) Benyapa Aimsaard (Thailand) Nuntakarn Aimsaard	(Indonesia) Rehan Naufal Kusharjanto (Indonesia) Lisa Ayu Kusumawati
Australian Open	Report	(China) Shi Yuqi	(South Korea) An Se-young	(China) Liu Yuchen (China) Ou Xuanyi	(China) Zhang Shuxian (China) Zheng Yu	(South Korea) Seo Seung-jae (South Korea) Chae Yoo-jung
New Zealand Open	Report	Cancelled				
Super 100
Odisha Open	Report	(India) Kiran George	(India) Unnati Hooda	(Malaysia) Nur Mohd Azriyn Ayub (Malaysia) Lim Khim Wah	(India) Gayatri Gopichand (India) Treesa Jolly	(Sri Lanka) Sachin Dias (Sri Lanka) Thilini Hendahewa
Orléans Masters	Report	(France) Toma Junior Popov	(Indonesia) Putri Kusuma Wardani	(Netherlands) Ruben Jille (Netherlands) Ties van der Lecq	(Bulgaria) Gabriela Stoeva (Bulgaria) Stefani Stoeva	(Singapore) Terry Hee (Singapore) Tan Wei Han
Akita Masters	Report	Cancelled				
Vietnam Open	Report	(Japan) Kodai Naraoka	(Vietnam) Nguyễn Thùy Linh	(China) Ren Xiangyu (China) Tan Qiang	(Thailand) Benyapa Aimsaard (Thailand) Nuntakarn Aimsaard	(Indonesia) Dejan Ferdinansyah (Indonesia) Gloria Emanuelle Widjaja
Canada Open	Report	(France) Alex Lanier	(Canada) Michelle Li	(Japan) Ayato Endo (Japan) Yuta Takei	(Japan) Rena Miyaura (Japan) Ayako Sakuramoto	(Chinese Taipei) Ye Hong-wei (Chinese Taipei) Lee Chia-hsin
Indonesia Masters Super 100	Report	(Malaysia) Leong Jun Hao	(China) Gao Fangjie	(Indonesia) Rahmat Hidayat (Indonesia) Pramudya Kusumawardana	(Japan) Rui Hirokami (Japan) Yuna Kato	(China) Jiang Zhenbang (China) Wei Yaxin

== Finals ==
This is the complete schedule of events on the 2022 calendar, with the champions and runners-up documented.

=== January ===
Date	Tournament	Champions	Runners-up
11–16 January	India Open (Draw): Host: New Delhi, India; Venue: K. D. Jadhav Indoor Stadium; Level: Super 500; Prize: $400,000; Format: 32MS/32WS/32MD/32WD/32XD	(India) Lakshya Sen	(Singapore) Loh Kean Yew
11–16 January	India Open (Draw): Host: New Delhi, India; Venue: K. D. Jadhav Indoor Stadium; Level: Super 500; Prize: $400,000; Format: 32MS/32WS/32MD/32WD/32XD	Score: 24–22, 21–17	
11–16 January	India Open (Draw): Host: New Delhi, India; Venue: K. D. Jadhav Indoor Stadium; Level: Super 500; Prize: $400,000; Format: 32MS/32WS/32MD/32WD/32XD	(Thailand) Busanan Ongbamrungphan	(Thailand) Supanida Katethong
11–16 January	India Open (Draw): Host: New Delhi, India; Venue: K. D. Jadhav Indoor Stadium; Level: Super 500; Prize: $400,000; Format: 32MS/32WS/32MD/32WD/32XD	Score: 22–20, 19–21, 21–13	
11–16 January	India Open (Draw): Host: New Delhi, India; Venue: K. D. Jadhav Indoor Stadium; Level: Super 500; Prize: $400,000; Format: 32MS/32WS/32MD/32WD/32XD	(India) Satwiksairaj Rankireddy (India) Chirag Shetty	(Indonesia) Mohammad Ahsan (Indonesia) Hendra Setiawan
11–16 January	India Open (Draw): Host: New Delhi, India; Venue: K. D. Jadhav Indoor Stadium; Level: Super 500; Prize: $400,000; Format: 32MS/32WS/32MD/32WD/32XD	Score: 21–16, 26–24	
11–16 January	India Open (Draw): Host: New Delhi, India; Venue: K. D. Jadhav Indoor Stadium; Level: Super 500; Prize: $400,000; Format: 32MS/32WS/32MD/32WD/32XD	(Thailand) Benyapa Aimsaard (Thailand) Nuntakarn Aimsaard	(Russia) Anastasiia Akchurina (Russia) Olga Morozova
11–16 January	India Open (Draw): Host: New Delhi, India; Venue: K. D. Jadhav Indoor Stadium; Level: Super 500; Prize: $400,000; Format: 32MS/32WS/32MD/32WD/32XD	Score: 21–13, 21–5	
11–16 January	India Open (Draw): Host: New Delhi, India; Venue: K. D. Jadhav Indoor Stadium; Level: Super 500; Prize: $400,000; Format: 32MS/32WS/32MD/32WD/32XD	(Singapore) Terry Hee (Singapore) Tan Wei Han	(Malaysia) Chen Tang Jie (Malaysia) Peck Yen Wei
11–16 January	India Open (Draw): Host: New Delhi, India; Venue: K. D. Jadhav Indoor Stadium; Level: Super 500; Prize: $400,000; Format: 32MS/32WS/32MD/32WD/32XD	Score: 21–15, 21–18	
18–23 January	Syed Modi International (Draw): Host: Lucknow, India; Venue: Babu Banarasi Das Indoor Stadium; Level: Super 300; Prize: $150,000; Format: 32MS/32WS/32MD/32WD/32XD	Not awarded	(France) Lucas Claerbout (France) Arnaud Merklé
18–23 January	Syed Modi International (Draw): Host: Lucknow, India; Venue: Babu Banarasi Das Indoor Stadium; Level: Super 300; Prize: $150,000; Format: 32MS/32WS/32MD/32WD/32XD	Score: Withdrew	
18–23 January	Syed Modi International (Draw): Host: Lucknow, India; Venue: Babu Banarasi Das Indoor Stadium; Level: Super 300; Prize: $150,000; Format: 32MS/32WS/32MD/32WD/32XD	(India) P. V. Sindhu	(India) Malvika Bansod
18–23 January	Syed Modi International (Draw): Host: Lucknow, India; Venue: Babu Banarasi Das Indoor Stadium; Level: Super 300; Prize: $150,000; Format: 32MS/32WS/32MD/32WD/32XD	Score: 21–13, 21–16	
18–23 January	Syed Modi International (Draw): Host: Lucknow, India; Venue: Babu Banarasi Das Indoor Stadium; Level: Super 300; Prize: $150,000; Format: 32MS/32WS/32MD/32WD/32XD	(Malaysia) Man Wei Chong (Malaysia) Tee Kai Wun	(India) Krishna Prasad Garaga (India) Vishnuvardhan Goud Panjala
18–23 January	Syed Modi International (Draw): Host: Lucknow, India; Venue: Babu Banarasi Das Indoor Stadium; Level: Super 300; Prize: $150,000; Format: 32MS/32WS/32MD/32WD/32XD	Score: 21–18, 21–15	
18–23 January	Syed Modi International (Draw): Host: Lucknow, India; Venue: Babu Banarasi Das Indoor Stadium; Level: Super 300; Prize: $150,000; Format: 32MS/32WS/32MD/32WD/32XD	(Malaysia) Anna Cheong (Malaysia) Teoh Mei Xing	(India) Gayatri Gopichand (India) Treesa Jolly
18–23 January	Syed Modi International (Draw): Host: Lucknow, India; Venue: Babu Banarasi Das Indoor Stadium; Level: Super 300; Prize: $150,000; Format: 32MS/32WS/32MD/32WD/32XD	Score: 21–12, 21–13	
18–23 January	Syed Modi International (Draw): Host: Lucknow, India; Venue: Babu Banarasi Das Indoor Stadium; Level: Super 300; Prize: $150,000; Format: 32MS/32WS/32MD/32WD/32XD	(India) Ishaan Bhatnagar (India) Tanisha Crasto	(India) T. Hema Nagendra Babu (India) Srivedya Gurazada
18–23 January	Syed Modi International (Draw): Host: Lucknow, India; Venue: Babu Banarasi Das Indoor Stadium; Level: Super 300; Prize: $150,000; Format: 32MS/32WS/32MD/32WD/32XD	Score: 21–16, 21–12	
25–30 January	Odisha Open (Draw): Host: Cuttack, India; Venue: Jawaharlal Nehru Indoor Stadium; Level: Super 100; Prize: $75,000; Format: 48MS/32WS/32MD/32WD/32XD	(India) Kiran George	(India) Priyanshu Rajawat
25–30 January	Odisha Open (Draw): Host: Cuttack, India; Venue: Jawaharlal Nehru Indoor Stadium; Level: Super 100; Prize: $75,000; Format: 48MS/32WS/32MD/32WD/32XD	Score: 21–15, 14–21, 21–18	
25–30 January	Odisha Open (Draw): Host: Cuttack, India; Venue: Jawaharlal Nehru Indoor Stadium; Level: Super 100; Prize: $75,000; Format: 48MS/32WS/32MD/32WD/32XD	(India) Unnati Hooda	(India) Smit Toshniwal
25–30 January	Odisha Open (Draw): Host: Cuttack, India; Venue: Jawaharlal Nehru Indoor Stadium; Level: Super 100; Prize: $75,000; Format: 48MS/32WS/32MD/32WD/32XD	Score: 21–18, 21–11	
25–30 January	Odisha Open (Draw): Host: Cuttack, India; Venue: Jawaharlal Nehru Indoor Stadium; Level: Super 100; Prize: $75,000; Format: 48MS/32WS/32MD/32WD/32XD	(Malaysia) Nur Mohd Azriyn Ayub (Malaysia) Lim Khim Wah	(India) Ravikrishna Ps (India) Sankar Prasad Udayakumar
25–30 January	Odisha Open (Draw): Host: Cuttack, India; Venue: Jawaharlal Nehru Indoor Stadium; Level: Super 100; Prize: $75,000; Format: 48MS/32WS/32MD/32WD/32XD	Score: 18–21, 21–14, 21–16	
25–30 January	Odisha Open (Draw): Host: Cuttack, India; Venue: Jawaharlal Nehru Indoor Stadium; Level: Super 100; Prize: $75,000; Format: 48MS/32WS/32MD/32WD/32XD	(India) Gayatri Gopichand (India) Treesa Jolly	(India) Sanyogita Ghorpade (India) Shruti Mishra
25–30 January	Odisha Open (Draw): Host: Cuttack, India; Venue: Jawaharlal Nehru Indoor Stadium; Level: Super 100; Prize: $75,000; Format: 48MS/32WS/32MD/32WD/32XD	Score: 21–12, 21–10	
25–30 January	Odisha Open (Draw): Host: Cuttack, India; Venue: Jawaharlal Nehru Indoor Stadium; Level: Super 100; Prize: $75,000; Format: 48MS/32WS/32MD/32WD/32XD	(Sri Lanka) Sachin Dias (Sri Lanka) Thilini Hendahewa	(India) Arjun M. R. (India) Treesa Jolly
25–30 January	Odisha Open (Draw): Host: Cuttack, India; Venue: Jawaharlal Nehru Indoor Stadium; Level: Super 100; Prize: $75,000; Format: 48MS/32WS/32MD/32WD/32XD	Score: 21–16, 22–20	

=== February ===
No World Tour tournaments held in February.

=== March ===
Date	Tournament	Champions	Runners-up
1–6 March	Spain Masters (Draw) (cancelled) (Note: This tournament, originally to be played on said dates, was later cancelled due to the COVID-19 pandemic in Spain.): Host: Huelva, Spain; Venue: Palacio de los Deportes Carolina Marín; Level: Super 300; Prize: $140,000; Format: 32MS/32WS/32MD/32WD/32XD		
1–6 March	Spain Masters (Draw) (cancelled): Host: Huelva, Spain; Venue: Palacio de los Deportes Carolina Marín; Level: Super 300; Prize: $140,000; Format: 32MS/32WS/32MD/32WD/32XD	Score:	
1–6 March	Spain Masters (Draw) (cancelled): Host: Huelva, Spain; Venue: Palacio de los Deportes Carolina Marín; Level: Super 300; Prize: $140,000; Format: 32MS/32WS/32MD/32WD/32XD	Score:	
1–6 March	Spain Masters (Draw) (cancelled): Host: Huelva, Spain; Venue: Palacio de los Deportes Carolina Marín; Level: Super 300; Prize: $140,000; Format: 32MS/32WS/32MD/32WD/32XD	Score:	
1–6 March	Spain Masters (Draw) (cancelled): Host: Huelva, Spain; Venue: Palacio de los Deportes Carolina Marín; Level: Super 300; Prize: $140,000; Format: 32MS/32WS/32MD/32WD/32XD	Score:	
1–6 March	Spain Masters (Draw) (cancelled): Host: Huelva, Spain; Venue: Palacio de los Deportes Carolina Marín; Level: Super 300; Prize: $140,000; Format: 32MS/32WS/32MD/32WD/32XD	Score:	
8–13 March	German Open (Draw): Host: Mülheim, Germany; Venue: Westenergie Sporthalle; Level: Super 300; Prize: $180,000; Format: 32MS/32WS/32MD/32WD/32XD	(Thailand) Kunlavut Vitidsarn	(India) Lakshya Sen
8–13 March	German Open (Draw): Host: Mülheim, Germany; Venue: Westenergie Sporthalle; Level: Super 300; Prize: $180,000; Format: 32MS/32WS/32MD/32WD/32XD	Score: 21–18, 21–15	
8–13 March	German Open (Draw): Host: Mülheim, Germany; Venue: Westenergie Sporthalle; Level: Super 300; Prize: $180,000; Format: 32MS/32WS/32MD/32WD/32XD	(China) He Bingjiao	(China) Chen Yufei
8–13 March	German Open (Draw): Host: Mülheim, Germany; Venue: Westenergie Sporthalle; Level: Super 300; Prize: $180,000; Format: 32MS/32WS/32MD/32WD/32XD	Score: 21–14, 27–25	
8–13 March	German Open (Draw): Host: Mülheim, Germany; Venue: Westenergie Sporthalle; Level: Super 300; Prize: $180,000; Format: 32MS/32WS/32MD/32WD/32XD	(Malaysia) Goh Sze Fei (Malaysia) Nur Izzuddin	(China) Liu Yuchen (China) Ou Xuanyi
8–13 March	German Open (Draw): Host: Mülheim, Germany; Venue: Westenergie Sporthalle; Level: Super 300; Prize: $180,000; Format: 32MS/32WS/32MD/32WD/32XD	Score: 23–21, 16–21, 21–14	
8–13 March	German Open (Draw): Host: Mülheim, Germany; Venue: Westenergie Sporthalle; Level: Super 300; Prize: $180,000; Format: 32MS/32WS/32MD/32WD/32XD	(China) Chen Qingchen (China) Jia Yifan	(Bulgaria) Gabriela Stoeva (Bulgaria) Stefani Stoeva
8–13 March	German Open (Draw): Host: Mülheim, Germany; Venue: Westenergie Sporthalle; Level: Super 300; Prize: $180,000; Format: 32MS/32WS/32MD/32WD/32XD	Score: 21–16, 29–30, 21–19	
8–13 March	German Open (Draw): Host: Mülheim, Germany; Venue: Westenergie Sporthalle; Level: Super 300; Prize: $180,000; Format: 32MS/32WS/32MD/32WD/32XD	(Thailand) Dechapol Puavaranukroh (Thailand) Sapsiree Taerattanachai	(China) Ou Xuanyi (China) Huang Yaqiong
8–13 March	German Open (Draw): Host: Mülheim, Germany; Venue: Westenergie Sporthalle; Level: Super 300; Prize: $180,000; Format: 32MS/32WS/32MD/32WD/32XD	Score: 21–11, 21–9	
16–20 March	All England Open (Draw): Host: Birmingham, England; Venue: Utilita Arena Birmingham; Level: Super 1000; Prize: $1,000,000; Format: 32MS/32WS/32MD/32WD/32XD	(Denmark) Viktor Axelsen	(India) Lakshya Sen
16–20 March	All England Open (Draw): Host: Birmingham, England; Venue: Utilita Arena Birmingham; Level: Super 1000; Prize: $1,000,000; Format: 32MS/32WS/32MD/32WD/32XD	Score: 21–10, 21–15	
16–20 March	All England Open (Draw): Host: Birmingham, England; Venue: Utilita Arena Birmingham; Level: Super 1000; Prize: $1,000,000; Format: 32MS/32WS/32MD/32WD/32XD	(Japan) Akane Yamaguchi	(South Korea) An Se-young
16–20 March	All England Open (Draw): Host: Birmingham, England; Venue: Utilita Arena Birmingham; Level: Super 1000; Prize: $1,000,000; Format: 32MS/32WS/32MD/32WD/32XD	Score: 21–15, 21–15	
16–20 March	All England Open (Draw): Host: Birmingham, England; Venue: Utilita Arena Birmingham; Level: Super 1000; Prize: $1,000,000; Format: 32MS/32WS/32MD/32WD/32XD	(Indonesia) Muhammad Shohibul Fikri (Indonesia) Bagas Maulana	(Indonesia) Mohammad Ahsan (Indonesia) Hendra Setiawan
16–20 March	All England Open (Draw): Host: Birmingham, England; Venue: Utilita Arena Birmingham; Level: Super 1000; Prize: $1,000,000; Format: 32MS/32WS/32MD/32WD/32XD	Score: 21–19, 21–13	
16–20 March	All England Open (Draw): Host: Birmingham, England; Venue: Utilita Arena Birmingham; Level: Super 1000; Prize: $1,000,000; Format: 32MS/32WS/32MD/32WD/32XD	(Japan) Nami Matsuyama (Japan) Chiharu Shida	(China) Zhang Shuxian (China) Zheng Yu
16–20 March	All England Open (Draw): Host: Birmingham, England; Venue: Utilita Arena Birmingham; Level: Super 1000; Prize: $1,000,000; Format: 32MS/32WS/32MD/32WD/32XD	Score: 21–13, 21–9	
16–20 March	All England Open (Draw): Host: Birmingham, England; Venue: Utilita Arena Birmingham; Level: Super 1000; Prize: $1,000,000; Format: 32MS/32WS/32MD/32WD/32XD	(Japan) Yuta Watanabe (Japan) Arisa Higashino	(China) Wang Yilyu (China) Huang Dongping
16–20 March	All England Open (Draw): Host: Birmingham, England; Venue: Utilita Arena Birmingham; Level: Super 1000; Prize: $1,000,000; Format: 32MS/32WS/32MD/32WD/32XD	Score: 21–19, 21–19	
22–27 March	Swiss Open (Draw): Host: Basel, Switzerland; Venue: St. Jakobshalle; Level: Super 300; Prize: $180,000; Format: 32MS/32WS/32MD/32WD/32XD	(Indonesia) Jonatan Christie	(India) Prannoy H. S.
22–27 March	Swiss Open (Draw): Host: Basel, Switzerland; Venue: St. Jakobshalle; Level: Super 300; Prize: $180,000; Format: 32MS/32WS/32MD/32WD/32XD	Score: 21–12, 21–18	
22–27 March	Swiss Open (Draw): Host: Basel, Switzerland; Venue: St. Jakobshalle; Level: Super 300; Prize: $180,000; Format: 32MS/32WS/32MD/32WD/32XD	(India) P. V. Sindhu	(Thailand) Busanan Ongbamrungphan
22–27 March	Swiss Open (Draw): Host: Basel, Switzerland; Venue: St. Jakobshalle; Level: Super 300; Prize: $180,000; Format: 32MS/32WS/32MD/32WD/32XD	Score: 21–16, 21–8	
22–27 March	Swiss Open (Draw): Host: Basel, Switzerland; Venue: St. Jakobshalle; Level: Super 300; Prize: $180,000; Format: 32MS/32WS/32MD/32WD/32XD	(Indonesia) Fajar Alfian (Indonesia) Muhammad Rian Ardianto	(Malaysia) Goh Sze Fei (Malaysia) Nur Izzuddin
22–27 March	Swiss Open (Draw): Host: Basel, Switzerland; Venue: St. Jakobshalle; Level: Super 300; Prize: $180,000; Format: 32MS/32WS/32MD/32WD/32XD	Score: 21–18, 21–19	
22–27 March	Swiss Open (Draw): Host: Basel, Switzerland; Venue: St. Jakobshalle; Level: Super 300; Prize: $180,000; Format: 32MS/32WS/32MD/32WD/32XD	(Bulgaria) Gabriela Stoeva (Bulgaria) Stefani Stoeva	(Germany) Linda Efler (Germany) Isabel Lohau
22–27 March	Swiss Open (Draw): Host: Basel, Switzerland; Venue: St. Jakobshalle; Level: Super 300; Prize: $180,000; Format: 32MS/32WS/32MD/32WD/32XD	Score: 21–14, 21–12	
22–27 March	Swiss Open (Draw): Host: Basel, Switzerland; Venue: St. Jakobshalle; Level: Super 300; Prize: $180,000; Format: 32MS/32WS/32MD/32WD/32XD	(Germany) Mark Lamsfuß (Germany) Isabel Lohau	(Malaysia) Goh Soon Huat (Malaysia) Shevon Jemie Lai
22–27 March	Swiss Open (Draw): Host: Basel, Switzerland; Venue: St. Jakobshalle; Level: Super 300; Prize: $180,000; Format: 32MS/32WS/32MD/32WD/32XD	Score: 12–21, 21–18, 21–17	
29 March – 3 April	Orléans Masters (Draw): Host: Orléans, France; Venue: Palais des Sports; Level: Super 100; Prize: $90,000; Format: 48MS/32WS/32MD/32WD/32XD	(France) Toma Junior Popov	(India) Mithun Manjunath
29 March – 3 April	Orléans Masters (Draw): Host: Orléans, France; Venue: Palais des Sports; Level: Super 100; Prize: $90,000; Format: 48MS/32WS/32MD/32WD/32XD	Score: 21–11, 21–19	
29 March – 3 April	Orléans Masters (Draw): Host: Orléans, France; Venue: Palais des Sports; Level: Super 100; Prize: $90,000; Format: 48MS/32WS/32MD/32WD/32XD	(Indonesia) Putri Kusuma Wardani	(United States) Iris Wang
29 March – 3 April	Orléans Masters (Draw): Host: Orléans, France; Venue: Palais des Sports; Level: Super 100; Prize: $90,000; Format: 48MS/32WS/32MD/32WD/32XD	Score: 7–21, 21–19, 21–18	
29 March – 3 April	Orléans Masters (Draw): Host: Orléans, France; Venue: Palais des Sports; Level: Super 100; Prize: $90,000; Format: 48MS/32WS/32MD/32WD/32XD	(Netherlands) Ruben Jille (Netherlands) Ties van der Lecq	(Malaysia) Junaidi Arif (Malaysia) Muhammad Haikal
29 March – 3 April	Orléans Masters (Draw): Host: Orléans, France; Venue: Palais des Sports; Level: Super 100; Prize: $90,000; Format: 48MS/32WS/32MD/32WD/32XD	Score: Walkover	
29 March – 3 April	Orléans Masters (Draw): Host: Orléans, France; Venue: Palais des Sports; Level: Super 100; Prize: $90,000; Format: 48MS/32WS/32MD/32WD/32XD	(Bulgaria) Gabriela Stoeva (Bulgaria) Stefani Stoeva	(Germany) Stine Küspert (Germany) Emma Moszczynski
29 March – 3 April	Orléans Masters (Draw): Host: Orléans, France; Venue: Palais des Sports; Level: Super 100; Prize: $90,000; Format: 48MS/32WS/32MD/32WD/32XD	Score: 21–15, 21–14	
29 March – 3 April	Orléans Masters (Draw): Host: Orléans, France; Venue: Palais des Sports; Level: Super 100; Prize: $90,000; Format: 48MS/32WS/32MD/32WD/32XD	(Singapore) Terry Hee (Singapore) Tan Wei Han	(Indonesia) Rehan Naufal Kusharjanto (Indonesia) Lisa Ayu Kusumawati
29 March – 3 April	Orléans Masters (Draw): Host: Orléans, France; Venue: Palais des Sports; Level: Super 100; Prize: $90,000; Format: 48MS/32WS/32MD/32WD/32XD	Score: 21–12, 16–21, 21–13	

=== April ===
Date	Tournament	Champions	Runners-up
5–10 April	Korea Open (Draw): Host: Suncheon, South Korea; Venue: Palma Indoor Stadium; Level: Super 500; Prize: $360,000; Format: 32MS/32WS/32MD/16WD/32XD	(China) Weng Hongyang	(Indonesia) Jonatan Christie
5–10 April	Korea Open (Draw): Host: Suncheon, South Korea; Venue: Palma Indoor Stadium; Level: Super 500; Prize: $360,000; Format: 32MS/32WS/32MD/16WD/32XD	Score: 12–21, 21–19, 21–15	
5–10 April	Korea Open (Draw): Host: Suncheon, South Korea; Venue: Palma Indoor Stadium; Level: Super 500; Prize: $360,000; Format: 32MS/32WS/32MD/16WD/32XD	(South Korea) An Se-young	(Thailand) Pornpawee Chochuwong
5–10 April	Korea Open (Draw): Host: Suncheon, South Korea; Venue: Palma Indoor Stadium; Level: Super 500; Prize: $360,000; Format: 32MS/32WS/32MD/16WD/32XD	Score: 21–17, 21–18	
5–10 April	Korea Open (Draw): Host: Suncheon, South Korea; Venue: Palma Indoor Stadium; Level: Super 500; Prize: $360,000; Format: 32MS/32WS/32MD/16WD/32XD	(South Korea) Kang Min-hyuk (South Korea) Seo Seung-jae	(Indonesia) Fajar Alfian (Indonesia) Muhammad Rian Ardianto
5–10 April	Korea Open (Draw): Host: Suncheon, South Korea; Venue: Palma Indoor Stadium; Level: Super 500; Prize: $360,000; Format: 32MS/32WS/32MD/16WD/32XD	Score: 19–21, 21–15, 21–18	
5–10 April	Korea Open (Draw): Host: Suncheon, South Korea; Venue: Palma Indoor Stadium; Level: Super 500; Prize: $360,000; Format: 32MS/32WS/32MD/16WD/32XD	(South Korea) Jeong Na-eun (South Korea) Kim Hye-jeong	(Thailand) Benyapa Aimsaard (Thailand) Nuntakarn Aimsaard
5–10 April	Korea Open (Draw): Host: Suncheon, South Korea; Venue: Palma Indoor Stadium; Level: Super 500; Prize: $360,000; Format: 32MS/32WS/32MD/16WD/32XD	Score: 21–16, 21–12	
5–10 April	Korea Open (Draw): Host: Suncheon, South Korea; Venue: Palma Indoor Stadium; Level: Super 500; Prize: $360,000; Format: 32MS/32WS/32MD/16WD/32XD	(Malaysia) Tan Kian Meng (Malaysia) Lai Pei Jing	(South Korea) Ko Sung-hyun (South Korea) Eom Hye-won
5–10 April	Korea Open (Draw): Host: Suncheon, South Korea; Venue: Palma Indoor Stadium; Level: Super 500; Prize: $360,000; Format: 32MS/32WS/32MD/16WD/32XD	Score: 21–15, 21–18	
12–17 April	Korea Masters (Draw): Host: Gwangju, South Korea; Venue: Gwangju Women's University Stadium; Level: Super 300; Prize: $180,000; Format: 32MS/32WS/32MD/32WD/32XD	(South Korea) Jeon Hyeok-jin	(Japan) Kodai Naraoka
12–17 April	Korea Masters (Draw): Host: Gwangju, South Korea; Venue: Gwangju Women's University Stadium; Level: Super 300; Prize: $180,000; Format: 32MS/32WS/32MD/32WD/32XD	Score: 21–17, 21–16	
12–17 April	Korea Masters (Draw): Host: Gwangju, South Korea; Venue: Gwangju Women's University Stadium; Level: Super 300; Prize: $180,000; Format: 32MS/32WS/32MD/32WD/32XD	(China) He Bingjiao	(China) Chen Yufei
12–17 April	Korea Masters (Draw): Host: Gwangju, South Korea; Venue: Gwangju Women's University Stadium; Level: Super 300; Prize: $180,000; Format: 32MS/32WS/32MD/32WD/32XD	Score: 21–14, 14–21, 21–9	
12–17 April	Korea Masters (Draw): Host: Gwangju, South Korea; Venue: Gwangju Women's University Stadium; Level: Super 300; Prize: $180,000; Format: 32MS/32WS/32MD/32WD/32XD	(South Korea) Kim Gi-jung (South Korea) Kim Sa-rang	(China) Liu Yuchen (China) Ou Xuanyi
12–17 April	Korea Masters (Draw): Host: Gwangju, South Korea; Venue: Gwangju Women's University Stadium; Level: Super 300; Prize: $180,000; Format: 32MS/32WS/32MD/32WD/32XD	Score: 21–14, 21–16	
12–17 April	Korea Masters (Draw): Host: Gwangju, South Korea; Venue: Gwangju Women's University Stadium; Level: Super 300; Prize: $180,000; Format: 32MS/32WS/32MD/32WD/32XD	(South Korea) Kim So-yeong (South Korea) Kong Hee-yong	(South Korea) Baek Ha-na (South Korea) Lee Yu-rim
12–17 April	Korea Masters (Draw): Host: Gwangju, South Korea; Venue: Gwangju Women's University Stadium; Level: Super 300; Prize: $180,000; Format: 32MS/32WS/32MD/32WD/32XD	Score: 21–17, 21–12	
12–17 April	Korea Masters (Draw): Host: Gwangju, South Korea; Venue: Gwangju Women's University Stadium; Level: Super 300; Prize: $180,000; Format: 32MS/32WS/32MD/32WD/32XD	(China) Wang Yilyu (China) Huang Dongping	(China) Ou Xuanyi (China) Huang Yaqiong
12–17 April	Korea Masters (Draw): Host: Gwangju, South Korea; Venue: Gwangju Women's University Stadium; Level: Super 300; Prize: $180,000; Format: 32MS/32WS/32MD/32WD/32XD	Score: 21–17, 21–17	

=== May ===
Date	Tournament	Champions	Runners-up
17–22 May	Thailand Open (Draw): Host: Pak Kret, Thailand; Venue: Impact Arena; Level: Super 500; Prize: $360,000; Format: 32MS/32WS/32MD/32WD/32XD	(Malaysia) Lee Zii Jia	(China) Li Shifeng
17–22 May	Thailand Open (Draw): Host: Pak Kret, Thailand; Venue: Impact Arena; Level: Super 500; Prize: $360,000; Format: 32MS/32WS/32MD/32WD/32XD	Score: 17–21, 21–11, 23–21	
17–22 May	Thailand Open (Draw): Host: Pak Kret, Thailand; Venue: Impact Arena; Level: Super 500; Prize: $360,000; Format: 32MS/32WS/32MD/32WD/32XD	(Chinese Taipei) Tai Tzu-ying	(China) Chen Yufei
17–22 May	Thailand Open (Draw): Host: Pak Kret, Thailand; Venue: Impact Arena; Level: Super 500; Prize: $360,000; Format: 32MS/32WS/32MD/32WD/32XD	Score: 21–15, 17–21, 21–12	
17–22 May	Thailand Open (Draw): Host: Pak Kret, Thailand; Venue: Impact Arena; Level: Super 500; Prize: $360,000; Format: 32MS/32WS/32MD/32WD/32XD	(Japan) Takuro Hoki (Japan) Yugo Kobayashi	(Indonesia) Fajar Alfian (Indonesia) Muhammad Rian Ardianto
17–22 May	Thailand Open (Draw): Host: Pak Kret, Thailand; Venue: Impact Arena; Level: Super 500; Prize: $360,000; Format: 32MS/32WS/32MD/32WD/32XD	Score: 13–4 retired	
17–22 May	Thailand Open (Draw): Host: Pak Kret, Thailand; Venue: Impact Arena; Level: Super 500; Prize: $360,000; Format: 32MS/32WS/32MD/32WD/32XD	(Japan) Nami Matsuyama (Japan) Chiharu Shida	(Japan) Mayu Matsumoto (Japan) Wakana Nagahara
17–22 May	Thailand Open (Draw): Host: Pak Kret, Thailand; Venue: Impact Arena; Level: Super 500; Prize: $360,000; Format: 32MS/32WS/32MD/32WD/32XD	Score: 17–21, 21–15, 26–24	
17–22 May	Thailand Open (Draw): Host: Pak Kret, Thailand; Venue: Impact Arena; Level: Super 500; Prize: $360,000; Format: 32MS/32WS/32MD/32WD/32XD	(China) Zheng Siwei (China) Huang Yaqiong	(Thailand) Dechapol Puavaranukroh (Thailand) Sapsiree Taerattanachai
17–22 May	Thailand Open (Draw): Host: Pak Kret, Thailand; Venue: Impact Arena; Level: Super 500; Prize: $360,000; Format: 32MS/32WS/32MD/32WD/32XD	Score: 21–12, 18–21, 21–14	

=== June ===
Date	Tournament	Champions	Runners-up
7–12 June	Indonesia Masters (Draw): Host: Jakarta, Indonesia; Venue: Istora Gelora Bung Karno; Level: Super 500; Prize: $360,000; Format: 32MS/32WS/32MD/32WD/32XD	(Denmark) Viktor Axelsen	(Chinese Taipei) Chou Tien-chen
7–12 June	Indonesia Masters (Draw): Host: Jakarta, Indonesia; Venue: Istora Gelora Bung Karno; Level: Super 500; Prize: $360,000; Format: 32MS/32WS/32MD/32WD/32XD	Score: 21–10, 21–12	
7–12 June	Indonesia Masters (Draw): Host: Jakarta, Indonesia; Venue: Istora Gelora Bung Karno; Level: Super 500; Prize: $360,000; Format: 32MS/32WS/32MD/32WD/32XD	(China) Chen Yufei	(Thailand) Ratchanok Intanon
7–12 June	Indonesia Masters (Draw): Host: Jakarta, Indonesia; Venue: Istora Gelora Bung Karno; Level: Super 500; Prize: $360,000; Format: 32MS/32WS/32MD/32WD/32XD	Score: 21–16, 18–21, 21–15	
7–12 June	Indonesia Masters (Draw): Host: Jakarta, Indonesia; Venue: Istora Gelora Bung Karno; Level: Super 500; Prize: $360,000; Format: 32MS/32WS/32MD/32WD/32XD	(Indonesia) Fajar Alfian (Indonesia) Muhammad Rian Ardianto	(China) Liang Weikeng (China) Wang Chang
7–12 June	Indonesia Masters (Draw): Host: Jakarta, Indonesia; Venue: Istora Gelora Bung Karno; Level: Super 500; Prize: $360,000; Format: 32MS/32WS/32MD/32WD/32XD	Score: 21–10, 21–17	
7–12 June	Indonesia Masters (Draw): Host: Jakarta, Indonesia; Venue: Istora Gelora Bung Karno; Level: Super 500; Prize: $360,000; Format: 32MS/32WS/32MD/32WD/32XD	(China) Chen Qingchen (China) Jia Yifan	(Indonesia) Apriyani Rahayu (Indonesia) Siti Fadia Silva Ramadhanti
7–12 June	Indonesia Masters (Draw): Host: Jakarta, Indonesia; Venue: Istora Gelora Bung Karno; Level: Super 500; Prize: $360,000; Format: 32MS/32WS/32MD/32WD/32XD	Score: 21–18, 21–12	
7–12 June	Indonesia Masters (Draw): Host: Jakarta, Indonesia; Venue: Istora Gelora Bung Karno; Level: Super 500; Prize: $360,000; Format: 32MS/32WS/32MD/32WD/32XD	(China) Zheng Siwei (China) Huang Yaqiong	(France) Thom Gicquel (France) Delphine Delrue
7–12 June	Indonesia Masters (Draw): Host: Jakarta, Indonesia; Venue: Istora Gelora Bung Karno; Level: Super 500; Prize: $360,000; Format: 32MS/32WS/32MD/32WD/32XD	Score: 21–13, 21–14	
14–19 June	Indonesia Open (Draw): Host: Jakarta, Indonesia; Venue: Istora Gelora Bung Karno; Level: Super 1000; Prize: $1,200,000; Format: 32MS/32WS/32MD/32WD/32XD	(Denmark) Viktor Axelsen	(China) Zhao Junpeng
14–19 June	Indonesia Open (Draw): Host: Jakarta, Indonesia; Venue: Istora Gelora Bung Karno; Level: Super 1000; Prize: $1,200,000; Format: 32MS/32WS/32MD/32WD/32XD	Score: 21–9, 21–10	
14–19 June	Indonesia Open (Draw): Host: Jakarta, Indonesia; Venue: Istora Gelora Bung Karno; Level: Super 1000; Prize: $1,200,000; Format: 32MS/32WS/32MD/32WD/32XD	(Chinese Taipei) Tai Tzu-ying	(China) Wang Zhiyi
14–19 June	Indonesia Open (Draw): Host: Jakarta, Indonesia; Venue: Istora Gelora Bung Karno; Level: Super 1000; Prize: $1,200,000; Format: 32MS/32WS/32MD/32WD/32XD	Score: 21–23, 21–6, 21–15	
14–19 June	Indonesia Open (Draw): Host: Jakarta, Indonesia; Venue: Istora Gelora Bung Karno; Level: Super 1000; Prize: $1,200,000; Format: 32MS/32WS/32MD/32WD/32XD	(China) Liu Yuchen (China) Ou Xuanyi	(South Korea) Choi Sol-gyu (South Korea) Kim Won-ho
14–19 June	Indonesia Open (Draw): Host: Jakarta, Indonesia; Venue: Istora Gelora Bung Karno; Level: Super 1000; Prize: $1,200,000; Format: 32MS/32WS/32MD/32WD/32XD	Score: 21–17, 23–21	
14–19 June	Indonesia Open (Draw): Host: Jakarta, Indonesia; Venue: Istora Gelora Bung Karno; Level: Super 1000; Prize: $1,200,000; Format: 32MS/32WS/32MD/32WD/32XD	(Japan) Nami Matsuyama (Japan) Chiharu Shida	(Japan) Yuki Fukushima (Japan) Sayaka Hirota
14–19 June	Indonesia Open (Draw): Host: Jakarta, Indonesia; Venue: Istora Gelora Bung Karno; Level: Super 1000; Prize: $1,200,000; Format: 32MS/32WS/32MD/32WD/32XD	Score: 18–21, 21–14, 21–17	
14–19 June	Indonesia Open (Draw): Host: Jakarta, Indonesia; Venue: Istora Gelora Bung Karno; Level: Super 1000; Prize: $1,200,000; Format: 32MS/32WS/32MD/32WD/32XD	(China) Zheng Siwei (China) Huang Yaqiong	(Japan) Yuta Watanabe (Japan) Arisa Higashino
14–19 June	Indonesia Open (Draw): Host: Jakarta, Indonesia; Venue: Istora Gelora Bung Karno; Level: Super 1000; Prize: $1,200,000; Format: 32MS/32WS/32MD/32WD/32XD	Score: 21–14, 21–16	
28 June – 3 July	Malaysia Open (Draw): Host: Kuala Lumpur, Malaysia; Venue: Axiata Arena; Level: Super 750; Prize: $675,000; Format: 32MS/32WS/32MD/32WD/32XD	(Denmark) Viktor Axelsen	(Japan) Kento Momota
28 June – 3 July	Malaysia Open (Draw): Host: Kuala Lumpur, Malaysia; Venue: Axiata Arena; Level: Super 750; Prize: $675,000; Format: 32MS/32WS/32MD/32WD/32XD	Score: 21–4, 21–7	
28 June – 3 July	Malaysia Open (Draw): Host: Kuala Lumpur, Malaysia; Venue: Axiata Arena; Level: Super 750; Prize: $675,000; Format: 32MS/32WS/32MD/32WD/32XD	(Thailand) Ratchanok Intanon	(China) Chen Yufei
28 June – 3 July	Malaysia Open (Draw): Host: Kuala Lumpur, Malaysia; Venue: Axiata Arena; Level: Super 750; Prize: $675,000; Format: 32MS/32WS/32MD/32WD/32XD	Score: 21–15, 13–21, 21–16	
28 June – 3 July	Malaysia Open (Draw): Host: Kuala Lumpur, Malaysia; Venue: Axiata Arena; Level: Super 750; Prize: $675,000; Format: 32MS/32WS/32MD/32WD/32XD	(Japan) Takuro Hoki (Japan) Yugo Kobayashi	(Indonesia) Fajar Alfian (Indonesia) Muhammad Rian Ardianto
28 June – 3 July	Malaysia Open (Draw): Host: Kuala Lumpur, Malaysia; Venue: Axiata Arena; Level: Super 750; Prize: $675,000; Format: 32MS/32WS/32MD/32WD/32XD	Score: 24–22, 16–21, 21–9	
28 June – 3 July	Malaysia Open (Draw): Host: Kuala Lumpur, Malaysia; Venue: Axiata Arena; Level: Super 750; Prize: $675,000; Format: 32MS/32WS/32MD/32WD/32XD	(Indonesia) Apriyani Rahayu (Indonesia) Siti Fadia Silva Ramadhanti	(China) Zhang Shuxian (China) Zheng Yu
28 June – 3 July	Malaysia Open (Draw): Host: Kuala Lumpur, Malaysia; Venue: Axiata Arena; Level: Super 750; Prize: $675,000; Format: 32MS/32WS/32MD/32WD/32XD	Score: 21–18, 12–21, 21–19	
28 June – 3 July	Malaysia Open (Draw): Host: Kuala Lumpur, Malaysia; Venue: Axiata Arena; Level: Super 750; Prize: $675,000; Format: 32MS/32WS/32MD/32WD/32XD	(China) Zheng Siwei (China) Huang Yaqiong	(Thailand) Dechapol Puavaranukroh (Thailand) Sapsiree Taerattanachai
28 June – 3 July	Malaysia Open (Draw): Host: Kuala Lumpur, Malaysia; Venue: Axiata Arena; Level: Super 750; Prize: $675,000; Format: 32MS/32WS/32MD/32WD/32XD	Score: 21–13, 21–18	

=== July ===
Date	Tournament	Champions	Runners-up
5–10 July	Malaysia Masters (Draw): Host: Kuala Lumpur, Malaysia; Venue: Axiata Arena; Level: Super 500; Prize: $360,000; Format: 32MS/32WS/32MD/32WD/32XD	(Indonesia) Chico Aura Dwi Wardoyo	(Hong Kong) Ng Ka Long
5–10 July	Malaysia Masters (Draw): Host: Kuala Lumpur, Malaysia; Venue: Axiata Arena; Level: Super 500; Prize: $360,000; Format: 32MS/32WS/32MD/32WD/32XD	Score: 22–20, 21–15	
5–10 July	Malaysia Masters (Draw): Host: Kuala Lumpur, Malaysia; Venue: Axiata Arena; Level: Super 500; Prize: $360,000; Format: 32MS/32WS/32MD/32WD/32XD	(South Korea) An Se-young	(China) Chen Yufei
5–10 July	Malaysia Masters (Draw): Host: Kuala Lumpur, Malaysia; Venue: Axiata Arena; Level: Super 500; Prize: $360,000; Format: 32MS/32WS/32MD/32WD/32XD	Score: 21–17, 21–5	
5–10 July	Malaysia Masters (Draw): Host: Kuala Lumpur, Malaysia; Venue: Axiata Arena; Level: Super 500; Prize: $360,000; Format: 32MS/32WS/32MD/32WD/32XD	(Indonesia) Fajar Alfian (Indonesia) Muhammad Rian Ardianto	(Indonesia) Mohammad Ahsan (Indonesia) Hendra Setiawan
5–10 July	Malaysia Masters (Draw): Host: Kuala Lumpur, Malaysia; Venue: Axiata Arena; Level: Super 500; Prize: $360,000; Format: 32MS/32WS/32MD/32WD/32XD	Score: 21–12, 21–19	
5–10 July	Malaysia Masters (Draw): Host: Kuala Lumpur, Malaysia; Venue: Axiata Arena; Level: Super 500; Prize: $360,000; Format: 32MS/32WS/32MD/32WD/32XD	(China) Chen Qingchen (China) Jia Yifan	(Japan) Nami Matsuyama (Japan) Chiharu Shida
5–10 July	Malaysia Masters (Draw): Host: Kuala Lumpur, Malaysia; Venue: Axiata Arena; Level: Super 500; Prize: $360,000; Format: 32MS/32WS/32MD/32WD/32XD	Score: 21–11, 21–12	
5–10 July	Malaysia Masters (Draw): Host: Kuala Lumpur, Malaysia; Venue: Axiata Arena; Level: Super 500; Prize: $360,000; Format: 32MS/32WS/32MD/32WD/32XD	(China) Zheng Siwei (China) Huang Yaqiong	(Indonesia) Rinov Rivaldy (Indonesia) Pitha Haningtyas Mentari
5–10 July	Malaysia Masters (Draw): Host: Kuala Lumpur, Malaysia; Venue: Axiata Arena; Level: Super 500; Prize: $360,000; Format: 32MS/32WS/32MD/32WD/32XD	Score: 21–17, 21–12	
12–17 July	Singapore Open (Draw): Host: Singapore; Venue: Singapore Indoor Stadium; Level: Super 500; Prize: $370,000; Format: 32MS/32WS/32MD/32WD/32XD	(Indonesia) Anthony Sinisuka Ginting	(Japan) Kodai Naraoka
12–17 July	Singapore Open (Draw): Host: Singapore; Venue: Singapore Indoor Stadium; Level: Super 500; Prize: $370,000; Format: 32MS/32WS/32MD/32WD/32XD	Score: 23–21, 21–17	
12–17 July	Singapore Open (Draw): Host: Singapore; Venue: Singapore Indoor Stadium; Level: Super 500; Prize: $370,000; Format: 32MS/32WS/32MD/32WD/32XD	(India) P. V. Sindhu	(China) Wang Zhiyi
12–17 July	Singapore Open (Draw): Host: Singapore; Venue: Singapore Indoor Stadium; Level: Super 500; Prize: $370,000; Format: 32MS/32WS/32MD/32WD/32XD	Score: 21–9, 11–21, 21–15	
12–17 July	Singapore Open (Draw): Host: Singapore; Venue: Singapore Indoor Stadium; Level: Super 500; Prize: $370,000; Format: 32MS/32WS/32MD/32WD/32XD	(Indonesia) Leo Rolly Carnando (Indonesia) Daniel Marthin	(Indonesia) Fajar Alfian (Indonesia) Muhammad Rian Ardianto
12–17 July	Singapore Open (Draw): Host: Singapore; Venue: Singapore Indoor Stadium; Level: Super 500; Prize: $370,000; Format: 32MS/32WS/32MD/32WD/32XD	Score: 9–21, 21–14, 21–16	
12–17 July	Singapore Open (Draw): Host: Singapore; Venue: Singapore Indoor Stadium; Level: Super 500; Prize: $370,000; Format: 32MS/32WS/32MD/32WD/32XD	(Indonesia) Apriyani Rahayu (Indonesia) Siti Fadia Silva Ramadhanti	(China) Zhang Shuxian (China) Zheng Yu
12–17 July	Singapore Open (Draw): Host: Singapore; Venue: Singapore Indoor Stadium; Level: Super 500; Prize: $370,000; Format: 32MS/32WS/32MD/32WD/32XD	Score: 21–14, 21–17	
12–17 July	Singapore Open (Draw): Host: Singapore; Venue: Singapore Indoor Stadium; Level: Super 500; Prize: $370,000; Format: 32MS/32WS/32MD/32WD/32XD	(Thailand) Dechapol Puavaranukroh (Thailand) Sapsiree Taerattanachai	(China) Wang Yilyu (China) Huang Dongping
12–17 July	Singapore Open (Draw): Host: Singapore; Venue: Singapore Indoor Stadium; Level: Super 500; Prize: $370,000; Format: 32MS/32WS/32MD/32WD/32XD	Score: 21–12, 21–17	
19–24 July	Taipei Open (Draw): Host: Taipei, Taiwan; Venue: Taipei Heping Basketball Gymnasium; Level: Super 300; Prize: $500,000; Format: 32MS/32WS/32MD/32WD/32XD	(Chinese Taipei) Chou Tien-chen	(Japan) Kodai Naraoka
19–24 July	Taipei Open (Draw): Host: Taipei, Taiwan; Venue: Taipei Heping Basketball Gymnasium; Level: Super 300; Prize: $500,000; Format: 32MS/32WS/32MD/32WD/32XD	Score: 14–21, 21–10, 21–6	
19–24 July	Taipei Open (Draw): Host: Taipei, Taiwan; Venue: Taipei Heping Basketball Gymnasium; Level: Super 300; Prize: $500,000; Format: 32MS/32WS/32MD/32WD/32XD	(Chinese Taipei) Tai Tzu-ying	(Japan) Saena Kawakami
19–24 July	Taipei Open (Draw): Host: Taipei, Taiwan; Venue: Taipei Heping Basketball Gymnasium; Level: Super 300; Prize: $500,000; Format: 32MS/32WS/32MD/32WD/32XD	Score: 21–17, 21–16	
19–24 July	Taipei Open (Draw): Host: Taipei, Taiwan; Venue: Taipei Heping Basketball Gymnasium; Level: Super 300; Prize: $500,000; Format: 32MS/32WS/32MD/32WD/32XD	(Malaysia) Man Wei Chong (Malaysia) Tee Kai Wun	(Chinese Taipei) Lee Yang (Chinese Taipei) Wang Chi-lin
19–24 July	Taipei Open (Draw): Host: Taipei, Taiwan; Venue: Taipei Heping Basketball Gymnasium; Level: Super 300; Prize: $500,000; Format: 32MS/32WS/32MD/32WD/32XD	Score: 21–18, 10–21, 21–18	
19–24 July	Taipei Open (Draw): Host: Taipei, Taiwan; Venue: Taipei Heping Basketball Gymnasium; Level: Super 300; Prize: $500,000; Format: 32MS/32WS/32MD/32WD/32XD	(Hong Kong) Ng Tsz Yau (Hong Kong) Tsang Hiu Yan	(Japan) Rui Hirokami (Japan) Yuna Kato
19–24 July	Taipei Open (Draw): Host: Taipei, Taiwan; Venue: Taipei Heping Basketball Gymnasium; Level: Super 300; Prize: $500,000; Format: 32MS/32WS/32MD/32WD/32XD	Score: 21–15, 18–21, 21–19	
19–24 July	Taipei Open (Draw): Host: Taipei, Taiwan; Venue: Taipei Heping Basketball Gymnasium; Level: Super 300; Prize: $500,000; Format: 32MS/32WS/32MD/32WD/32XD	(Hong Kong) Lee Chun Hei (Hong Kong) Ng Tsz Yau	(Thailand) Ruttanapak Oupthong (Thailand) Chasinee Korepap
19–24 July	Taipei Open (Draw): Host: Taipei, Taiwan; Venue: Taipei Heping Basketball Gymnasium; Level: Super 300; Prize: $500,000; Format: 32MS/32WS/32MD/32WD/32XD	Score: 21–8, 21–9	
26–31 July	Akita Masters (Draw) (cancelled) (Note: This tournament, originally to be played on 26–31 July, was later cancelled due to the COVID-19 pandemic in Japan.): Host: Akita, Akita Prefecture, Japan; Venue: CNA Arena Akita; Level: Super 100; Prize: $90,000; Format: 48MS/32WS/32MD/32WD/32XD		
26–31 July	Akita Masters (Draw) (cancelled): Host: Akita, Akita Prefecture, Japan; Venue: CNA Arena Akita; Level: Super 100; Prize: $90,000; Format: 48MS/32WS/32MD/32WD/32XD	Score:	
26–31 July	Akita Masters (Draw) (cancelled): Host: Akita, Akita Prefecture, Japan; Venue: CNA Arena Akita; Level: Super 100; Prize: $90,000; Format: 48MS/32WS/32MD/32WD/32XD	Score:	
26–31 July	Akita Masters (Draw) (cancelled): Host: Akita, Akita Prefecture, Japan; Venue: CNA Arena Akita; Level: Super 100; Prize: $90,000; Format: 48MS/32WS/32MD/32WD/32XD	Score:	
26–31 July	Akita Masters (Draw) (cancelled): Host: Akita, Akita Prefecture, Japan; Venue: CNA Arena Akita; Level: Super 100; Prize: $90,000; Format: 48MS/32WS/32MD/32WD/32XD	Score:	
26–31 July	Akita Masters (Draw) (cancelled): Host: Akita, Akita Prefecture, Japan; Venue: CNA Arena Akita; Level: Super 100; Prize: $90,000; Format: 48MS/32WS/32MD/32WD/32XD	Score:	

=== August ===
Date	Tournament	Champions	Runners-up
30 August – 4 September	Japan Open (Draw): Host: Osaka, Japan; Venue: Maruzen Intec Arena Osaka; Level: Super 750; Prize: $750,000; Format: 32MS/32WS/32MD/32WD/32XD	(Japan) Kenta Nishimoto	(Chinese Taipei) Chou Tien-chen
30 August – 4 September	Japan Open (Draw): Host: Osaka, Japan; Venue: Maruzen Intec Arena Osaka; Level: Super 750; Prize: $750,000; Format: 32MS/32WS/32MD/32WD/32XD	Score: 21–19, 21–23, 21–17	
30 August – 4 September	Japan Open (Draw): Host: Osaka, Japan; Venue: Maruzen Intec Arena Osaka; Level: Super 750; Prize: $750,000; Format: 32MS/32WS/32MD/32WD/32XD	(Japan) Akane Yamaguchi	(South Korea) An Se-young
30 August – 4 September	Japan Open (Draw): Host: Osaka, Japan; Venue: Maruzen Intec Arena Osaka; Level: Super 750; Prize: $750,000; Format: 32MS/32WS/32MD/32WD/32XD	Score: 21–9, 21–15	
30 August – 4 September	Japan Open (Draw): Host: Osaka, Japan; Venue: Maruzen Intec Arena Osaka; Level: Super 750; Prize: $750,000; Format: 32MS/32WS/32MD/32WD/32XD	(China) Liang Weikeng (China) Wang Chang	(Denmark) Kim Astrup (Denmark) Anders Skaarup Rasmussen
30 August – 4 September	Japan Open (Draw): Host: Osaka, Japan; Venue: Maruzen Intec Arena Osaka; Level: Super 750; Prize: $750,000; Format: 32MS/32WS/32MD/32WD/32XD	Score: 21–18, 13–21, 21–17	
30 August – 4 September	Japan Open (Draw): Host: Osaka, Japan; Venue: Maruzen Intec Arena Osaka; Level: Super 750; Prize: $750,000; Format: 32MS/32WS/32MD/32WD/32XD	(South Korea) Jeong Na-eun (South Korea) Kim Hye-jeong	(South Korea) Baek Ha-na (South Korea) Lee Yu-lim
30 August – 4 September	Japan Open (Draw): Host: Osaka, Japan; Venue: Maruzen Intec Arena Osaka; Level: Super 750; Prize: $750,000; Format: 32MS/32WS/32MD/32WD/32XD	Score: 23–21, 28–26	
30 August – 4 September	Japan Open (Draw): Host: Osaka, Japan; Venue: Maruzen Intec Arena Osaka; Level: Super 750; Prize: $750,000; Format: 32MS/32WS/32MD/32WD/32XD	(Thailand) Dechapol Puavaranukroh (Thailand) Sapsiree Taerattanachai	(Japan) Yuta Watanabe (Japan) Arisa Higashino
30 August – 4 September	Japan Open (Draw): Host: Osaka, Japan; Venue: Maruzen Intec Arena Osaka; Level: Super 750; Prize: $750,000; Format: 32MS/32WS/32MD/32WD/32XD	Score: 16–21, 23–21, 21–18	

=== September ===
Date	Tournament	Champions	Runners-up
27 September – 2 October	Vietnam Open (Draw): Host: Ho Chi Minh City, Vietnam; Venue: Nguyen Du Stadium; Level: Super 100; Prize: $75,000; Format: 48MS/32WS/32MD/32WD/32XD	(Japan) Kodai Naraoka	(China) Sun Feixiang
27 September – 2 October	Vietnam Open (Draw): Host: Ho Chi Minh City, Vietnam; Venue: Nguyen Du Stadium; Level: Super 100; Prize: $75,000; Format: 48MS/32WS/32MD/32WD/32XD	Score: 10–21, 21–14, 21–17	
27 September – 2 October	Vietnam Open (Draw): Host: Ho Chi Minh City, Vietnam; Venue: Nguyen Du Stadium; Level: Super 100; Prize: $75,000; Format: 48MS/32WS/32MD/32WD/32XD	(Vietnam) Nguyễn Thùy Linh	(Malaysia) Goh Jin Wei
27 September – 2 October	Vietnam Open (Draw): Host: Ho Chi Minh City, Vietnam; Venue: Nguyen Du Stadium; Level: Super 100; Prize: $75,000; Format: 48MS/32WS/32MD/32WD/32XD	Score: 21–15, 21–13	
27 September – 2 October	Vietnam Open (Draw): Host: Ho Chi Minh City, Vietnam; Venue: Nguyen Du Stadium; Level: Super 100; Prize: $75,000; Format: 48MS/32WS/32MD/32WD/32XD	(China) Ren Xiangyu (China) Tan Qiang	(China) He Jiting (China) Zhou Haodong
27 September – 2 October	Vietnam Open (Draw): Host: Ho Chi Minh City, Vietnam; Venue: Nguyen Du Stadium; Level: Super 100; Prize: $75,000; Format: 48MS/32WS/32MD/32WD/32XD	Score: 17–21, 21–18, 21–8	
27 September – 2 October	Vietnam Open (Draw): Host: Ho Chi Minh City, Vietnam; Venue: Nguyen Du Stadium; Level: Super 100; Prize: $75,000; Format: 48MS/32WS/32MD/32WD/32XD	(Thailand) Benyapa Aimsaard (Thailand) Nuntakarn Aimsaard	(Indonesia) Febriana Dwipuji Kusuma (Indonesia) Amalia Cahaya Pratiwi
27 September – 2 October	Vietnam Open (Draw): Host: Ho Chi Minh City, Vietnam; Venue: Nguyen Du Stadium; Level: Super 100; Prize: $75,000; Format: 48MS/32WS/32MD/32WD/32XD	Score: 21–16, 27–25	
27 September – 2 October	Vietnam Open (Draw): Host: Ho Chi Minh City, Vietnam; Venue: Nguyen Du Stadium; Level: Super 100; Prize: $75,000; Format: 48MS/32WS/32MD/32WD/32XD	(Indonesia) Dejan Ferdinansyah (Indonesia) Gloria Emanuelle Widjaja	(Indonesia) Rehan Naufal Kusharjanto (Indonesia) Lisa Ayu Kusumawati
27 September – 2 October	Vietnam Open (Draw): Host: Ho Chi Minh City, Vietnam; Venue: Nguyen Du Stadium; Level: Super 100; Prize: $75,000; Format: 48MS/32WS/32MD/32WD/32XD	Score: 21–13, 21–18	
27 September – 2 October	Canada Open (Draw): Host: Calgary, Canada; Venue: Markin MacPhail Centre; Level: Super 100; Prize: $90,000; Format: 48MS/32WS/32MD/32WD/32XD	(France) Alex Lanier	(Japan) Takuma Obayashi
27 September – 2 October	Canada Open (Draw): Host: Calgary, Canada; Venue: Markin MacPhail Centre; Level: Super 100; Prize: $90,000; Format: 48MS/32WS/32MD/32WD/32XD	Score: 21–12, 12–21, 21–13	
27 September – 2 October	Canada Open (Draw): Host: Calgary, Canada; Venue: Markin MacPhail Centre; Level: Super 100; Prize: $90,000; Format: 48MS/32WS/32MD/32WD/32XD	(Canada) Michelle Li	(Chinese Taipei) Sung Shuo-yun
27 September – 2 October	Canada Open (Draw): Host: Calgary, Canada; Venue: Markin MacPhail Centre; Level: Super 100; Prize: $90,000; Format: 48MS/32WS/32MD/32WD/32XD	Score: 21–16, 21–15	
27 September – 2 October	Canada Open (Draw): Host: Calgary, Canada; Venue: Markin MacPhail Centre; Level: Super 100; Prize: $90,000; Format: 48MS/32WS/32MD/32WD/32XD	(Japan) Ayato Endo (Japan) Yuta Takei	(Japan) Takuto Inoue (Japan) Kenya Mitsuhashi
27 September – 2 October	Canada Open (Draw): Host: Calgary, Canada; Venue: Markin MacPhail Centre; Level: Super 100; Prize: $90,000; Format: 48MS/32WS/32MD/32WD/32XD	Score: 21–15, 21–8	
27 September – 2 October	Canada Open (Draw): Host: Calgary, Canada; Venue: Markin MacPhail Centre; Level: Super 100; Prize: $90,000; Format: 48MS/32WS/32MD/32WD/32XD	(Japan) Rena Miyaura (Japan) Ayako Sakuramoto	(Japan) Rui Hirokami (Japan) Yuna Kato
27 September – 2 October	Canada Open (Draw): Host: Calgary, Canada; Venue: Markin MacPhail Centre; Level: Super 100; Prize: $90,000; Format: 48MS/32WS/32MD/32WD/32XD	Score: 21–13, 21–8	
27 September – 2 October	Canada Open (Draw): Host: Calgary, Canada; Venue: Markin MacPhail Centre; Level: Super 100; Prize: $90,000; Format: 48MS/32WS/32MD/32WD/32XD	(Chinese Taipei) Ye Hong-wei (Chinese Taipei) Lee Chia-hsin	(Japan) Hiroki Midorikawa (Japan) Natsu Saito
27 September – 2 October	Canada Open (Draw): Host: Calgary, Canada; Venue: Markin MacPhail Centre; Level: Super 100; Prize: $90,000; Format: 48MS/32WS/32MD/32WD/32XD	Score: 12–21, 21–12, 21–15	

=== October ===
Date	Tournament	Champions	Runners-up
4–9 October	U.S. Open (Draw) (cancelled) (Note: This tournament, originally to be played on 4–9 October, was later cancelled due to the COVID-19 pandemic in United States.): Host: United States; Venue: Level: Super 300; Prize: $170,000; Format: 32MS/32WS/32MD/32WD/32XD		
4–9 October	U.S. Open (Draw) (cancelled): Host: United States; Venue: Level: Super 300; Prize: $170,000; Format: 32MS/32WS/32MD/32WD/32XD	Score:	
4–9 October	U.S. Open (Draw) (cancelled): Host: United States; Venue: Level: Super 300; Prize: $170,000; Format: 32MS/32WS/32MD/32WD/32XD	Score:	
4–9 October	U.S. Open (Draw) (cancelled): Host: United States; Venue: Level: Super 300; Prize: $170,000; Format: 32MS/32WS/32MD/32WD/32XD	Score:	
4–9 October	U.S. Open (Draw) (cancelled): Host: United States; Venue: Level: Super 300; Prize: $170,000; Format: 32MS/32WS/32MD/32WD/32XD	Score:	
4–9 October	U.S. Open (Draw) (cancelled): Host: United States; Venue: Level: Super 300; Prize: $170,000; Format: 32MS/32WS/32MD/32WD/32XD	Score:	
18–23 October	Denmark Open (Draw): Host: Odense, Denmark; Venue: Arena Fyn; Level: Super 750; Prize: $750,000; Format: 32MS/32WS/32MD/32WD/32XD	(China) Shi Yuqi	(Malaysia) Lee Zii Jia
18–23 October	Denmark Open (Draw): Host: Odense, Denmark; Venue: Arena Fyn; Level: Super 750; Prize: $750,000; Format: 32MS/32WS/32MD/32WD/32XD	Score: 21–18, 16–21, 21–12	
18–23 October	Denmark Open (Draw): Host: Odense, Denmark; Venue: Arena Fyn; Level: Super 750; Prize: $750,000; Format: 32MS/32WS/32MD/32WD/32XD	(China) He Bingjiao	(China) Chen Yufei
18–23 October	Denmark Open (Draw): Host: Odense, Denmark; Venue: Arena Fyn; Level: Super 750; Prize: $750,000; Format: 32MS/32WS/32MD/32WD/32XD	Score: 22–20, 12–21, 21–10	
18–23 October	Denmark Open (Draw): Host: Odense, Denmark; Venue: Arena Fyn; Level: Super 750; Prize: $750,000; Format: 32MS/32WS/32MD/32WD/32XD	(Indonesia) Fajar Alfian (Indonesia) Muhammad Rian Ardianto	(Indonesia) Marcus Fernaldi Gideon (Indonesia) Kevin Sanjaya Sukamuljo
18–23 October	Denmark Open (Draw): Host: Odense, Denmark; Venue: Arena Fyn; Level: Super 750; Prize: $750,000; Format: 32MS/32WS/32MD/32WD/32XD	Score: 21–19, 28–26	
18–23 October	Denmark Open (Draw): Host: Odense, Denmark; Venue: Arena Fyn; Level: Super 750; Prize: $750,000; Format: 32MS/32WS/32MD/32WD/32XD	(China) Chen Qingchen (China) Jia Yifan	(South Korea) Baek Ha-na (South Korea) Lee So-hee
18–23 October	Denmark Open (Draw): Host: Odense, Denmark; Venue: Arena Fyn; Level: Super 750; Prize: $750,000; Format: 32MS/32WS/32MD/32WD/32XD	Score: 21–12, 21–15	
18–23 October	Denmark Open (Draw): Host: Odense, Denmark; Venue: Arena Fyn; Level: Super 750; Prize: $750,000; Format: 32MS/32WS/32MD/32WD/32XD	(China) Zheng Siwei (China) Huang Yaqiong	(China) Feng Yanzhe (China) Huang Dongping
18–23 October	Denmark Open (Draw): Host: Odense, Denmark; Venue: Arena Fyn; Level: Super 750; Prize: $750,000; Format: 32MS/32WS/32MD/32WD/32XD	Score: 21–19, 20–22, 21–19	
18–23 October	Indonesia Masters Super 100 (Draw): Host: Malang, Indonesia; Venue: Platinum Sports Hall; Level: Super 100; Prize: $90,000; Format: 48MS/32WS/32MD/32WD/32XD	(Malaysia) Leong Jun Hao	(Malaysia) Cheam June Wei
18–23 October	Indonesia Masters Super 100 (Draw): Host: Malang, Indonesia; Venue: Platinum Sports Hall; Level: Super 100; Prize: $90,000; Format: 48MS/32WS/32MD/32WD/32XD	Score: 9–21, 22–20, 21–19	
18–23 October	Indonesia Masters Super 100 (Draw): Host: Malang, Indonesia; Venue: Platinum Sports Hall; Level: Super 100; Prize: $90,000; Format: 48MS/32WS/32MD/32WD/32XD	(China) Gao Fangjie	(Japan) Riko Gunji
18–23 October	Indonesia Masters Super 100 (Draw): Host: Malang, Indonesia; Venue: Platinum Sports Hall; Level: Super 100; Prize: $90,000; Format: 48MS/32WS/32MD/32WD/32XD	Score: 21–10, 21–12	
18–23 October	Indonesia Masters Super 100 (Draw): Host: Malang, Indonesia; Venue: Platinum Sports Hall; Level: Super 100; Prize: $90,000; Format: 48MS/32WS/32MD/32WD/32XD	(Indonesia) Rahmat Hidayat (Indonesia) Pramudya Kusumawardana	(China) He Jiting (China) Zhou Haodong
18–23 October	Indonesia Masters Super 100 (Draw): Host: Malang, Indonesia; Venue: Platinum Sports Hall; Level: Super 100; Prize: $90,000; Format: 48MS/32WS/32MD/32WD/32XD	Score: 21–18, 21–19	
18–23 October	Indonesia Masters Super 100 (Draw): Host: Malang, Indonesia; Venue: Platinum Sports Hall; Level: Super 100; Prize: $90,000; Format: 48MS/32WS/32MD/32WD/32XD	(Japan) Rui Hirokami (Japan) Yuna Kato	(Japan) Rena Miyaura (Japan) Ayako Sakuramoto
18–23 October	Indonesia Masters Super 100 (Draw): Host: Malang, Indonesia; Venue: Platinum Sports Hall; Level: Super 100; Prize: $90,000; Format: 48MS/32WS/32MD/32WD/32XD	Score: 23–21, 21–18	
18–23 October	Indonesia Masters Super 100 (Draw): Host: Malang, Indonesia; Venue: Platinum Sports Hall; Level: Super 100; Prize: $90,000; Format: 48MS/32WS/32MD/32WD/32XD	(China) Jiang Zhenbang (China) Wei Yaxin	(China) Cheng Xing (China) Chen Fanghui
18–23 October	Indonesia Masters Super 100 (Draw): Host: Malang, Indonesia; Venue: Platinum Sports Hall; Level: Super 100; Prize: $90,000; Format: 48MS/32WS/32MD/32WD/32XD	Score: 21–12, 21–15	
25–30 October	French Open (Draw): Host: Paris, France; Venue: Stade Pierre de Coubertin; Level: Super 750; Prize: $600,000; Format: 32MS/32WS/32MD/32WD/32XD	(Denmark) Viktor Axelsen	(Denmark) Rasmus Gemke
25–30 October	French Open (Draw): Host: Paris, France; Venue: Stade Pierre de Coubertin; Level: Super 750; Prize: $600,000; Format: 32MS/32WS/32MD/32WD/32XD	Score: 21–14, 21–15	
25–30 October	French Open (Draw): Host: Paris, France; Venue: Stade Pierre de Coubertin; Level: Super 750; Prize: $600,000; Format: 32MS/32WS/32MD/32WD/32XD	(China) He Bingjiao	(Spain) Carolina Marín
25–30 October	French Open (Draw): Host: Paris, France; Venue: Stade Pierre de Coubertin; Level: Super 750; Prize: $600,000; Format: 32MS/32WS/32MD/32WD/32XD	Score: 16–21, 21–9, 22–20	
25–30 October	French Open (Draw): Host: Paris, France; Venue: Stade Pierre de Coubertin; Level: Super 750; Prize: $600,000; Format: 32MS/32WS/32MD/32WD/32XD	(India) Satwiksairaj Rankireddy (India) Chirag Shetty	(Chinese Taipei) Lu Ching-yao (Chinese Taipei) Yang Po-han
25–30 October	French Open (Draw): Host: Paris, France; Venue: Stade Pierre de Coubertin; Level: Super 750; Prize: $600,000; Format: 32MS/32WS/32MD/32WD/32XD	Score: 21–13, 21–19	
25–30 October	French Open (Draw): Host: Paris, France; Venue: Stade Pierre de Coubertin; Level: Super 750; Prize: $600,000; Format: 32MS/32WS/32MD/32WD/32XD	(Malaysia) Pearly Tan (Malaysia) Thinaah Muralitharan	(Japan) Mayu Matsumoto (Japan) Wakana Nagahara
25–30 October	French Open (Draw): Host: Paris, France; Venue: Stade Pierre de Coubertin; Level: Super 750; Prize: $600,000; Format: 32MS/32WS/32MD/32WD/32XD	Score: 21–19, 18–21, 21–15	
25–30 October	French Open (Draw): Host: Paris, France; Venue: Stade Pierre de Coubertin; Level: Super 750; Prize: $600,000; Format: 32MS/32WS/32MD/32WD/32XD	(China) Zheng Siwei (China) Huang Yaqiong	(Netherlands) Robin Tabeling (Netherlands) Selena Piek
25–30 October	French Open (Draw): Host: Paris, France; Venue: Stade Pierre de Coubertin; Level: Super 750; Prize: $600,000; Format: 32MS/32WS/32MD/32WD/32XD	Score: 21–16, 14–21, 22–20	

=== November ===
Date	Tournament	Champions	Runners-up
1–6 November	Hylo Open (Draw): Host: Saarbrücken, Germany; Venue: Saarlandhalle; Level: Super 300; Prize: $200,000; Format: 32MS/32WS/32MD/32WD/32XD	(Indonesia) Anthony Sinisuka Ginting	(Chinese Taipei) Chou Tien-chen
1–6 November	Hylo Open (Draw): Host: Saarbrücken, Germany; Venue: Saarlandhalle; Level: Super 300; Prize: $200,000; Format: 32MS/32WS/32MD/32WD/32XD	Score: 18–21, 21–11, 24–22	
1–6 November	Hylo Open (Draw): Host: Saarbrücken, Germany; Venue: Saarlandhalle; Level: Super 300; Prize: $200,000; Format: 32MS/32WS/32MD/32WD/32XD	(China) Han Yue	(China) Zhang Yiman
1–6 November	Hylo Open (Draw): Host: Saarbrücken, Germany; Venue: Saarlandhalle; Level: Super 300; Prize: $200,000; Format: 32MS/32WS/32MD/32WD/32XD	Score: 21–18, 21–16	
1–6 November	Hylo Open (Draw): Host: Saarbrücken, Germany; Venue: Saarlandhalle; Level: Super 300; Prize: $200,000; Format: 32MS/32WS/32MD/32WD/32XD	(Chinese Taipei) Lu Ching-yao (Chinese Taipei) Yang Po-han	(Chinese Taipei) Lee Jhe-huei (Chinese Taipei) Yang Po-hsuan
1–6 November	Hylo Open (Draw): Host: Saarbrücken, Germany; Venue: Saarlandhalle; Level: Super 300; Prize: $200,000; Format: 32MS/32WS/32MD/32WD/32XD	Score: 11–21, 21–17, 25–23	
1–6 November	Hylo Open (Draw): Host: Saarbrücken, Germany; Venue: Saarlandhalle; Level: Super 300; Prize: $200,000; Format: 32MS/32WS/32MD/32WD/32XD	(Thailand) Benyapa Aimsaard (Thailand) Nuntakarn Aimsaard	(Thailand) Jongkolphan Kititharakul (Thailand) Rawinda Prajongjai
1–6 November	Hylo Open (Draw): Host: Saarbrücken, Germany; Venue: Saarlandhalle; Level: Super 300; Prize: $200,000; Format: 32MS/32WS/32MD/32WD/32XD	Score: 21–18, 18–21, 21–17	
1–6 November	Hylo Open (Draw): Host: Saarbrücken, Germany; Venue: Saarlandhalle; Level: Super 300; Prize: $200,000; Format: 32MS/32WS/32MD/32WD/32XD	(Indonesia) Rehan Naufal Kusharjanto (Indonesia) Lisa Ayu Kusumawati	(China) Feng Yanzhe (China) Huang Dongping
1–6 November	Hylo Open (Draw): Host: Saarbrücken, Germany; Venue: Saarlandhalle; Level: Super 300; Prize: $200,000; Format: 32MS/32WS/32MD/32WD/32XD	Score: 21–17, 21–15	
1–6 November	Macau Open (Draw) (cancelled) (Note: This tournament, originally to be played on 1–6 November, was later cancelled due to the COVID-19 pandemic in Macau on 1 September 2022.): Host: Macau; Venue: TBD; Level: Super 300; Prize: $170,000; Format: 32MS/32WS/32MD/32WD/32XD		
1–6 November	Macau Open (Draw) (cancelled): Host: Macau; Venue: TBD; Level: Super 300; Prize: $170,000; Format: 32MS/32WS/32MD/32WD/32XD	Score:	
1–6 November	Macau Open (Draw) (cancelled): Host: Macau; Venue: TBD; Level: Super 300; Prize: $170,000; Format: 32MS/32WS/32MD/32WD/32XD	Score:	
1–6 November	Macau Open (Draw) (cancelled): Host: Macau; Venue: TBD; Level: Super 300; Prize: $170,000; Format: 32MS/32WS/32MD/32WD/32XD	Score:	
1–6 November	Macau Open (Draw) (cancelled): Host: Macau; Venue: TBD; Level: Super 300; Prize: $170,000; Format: 32MS/32WS/32MD/32WD/32XD	Score:	
1–6 November	Macau Open (Draw) (cancelled): Host: Macau; Venue: TBD; Level: Super 300; Prize: $170,000; Format: 32MS/32WS/32MD/32WD/32XD	Score:	
8–13 November	Hong Kong Open (Draw) (cancelled) (Note: This tournament, originally to be played on 8–13 November, was later cancelled due to the COVID-19 pandemic in Hong Kong on 1 September 2022.): Host: Kowloon, Hong Kong; Venue: Hong Kong Coliseum; Level: Super 500; Prize: $400,000; Format: 32MS/32WS/32MD/32WD/32XD		
8–13 November	Hong Kong Open (Draw) (cancelled): Host: Kowloon, Hong Kong; Venue: Hong Kong Coliseum; Level: Super 500; Prize: $400,000; Format: 32MS/32WS/32MD/32WD/32XD	Score:	
8–13 November	Hong Kong Open (Draw) (cancelled): Host: Kowloon, Hong Kong; Venue: Hong Kong Coliseum; Level: Super 500; Prize: $400,000; Format: 32MS/32WS/32MD/32WD/32XD	Score:	
8–13 November	Hong Kong Open (Draw) (cancelled): Host: Kowloon, Hong Kong; Venue: Hong Kong Coliseum; Level: Super 500; Prize: $400,000; Format: 32MS/32WS/32MD/32WD/32XD	Score:	
8–13 November	Hong Kong Open (Draw) (cancelled): Host: Kowloon, Hong Kong; Venue: Hong Kong Coliseum; Level: Super 500; Prize: $400,000; Format: 32MS/32WS/32MD/32WD/32XD	Score:	
8–13 November	Hong Kong Open (Draw) (cancelled): Host: Kowloon, Hong Kong; Venue: Hong Kong Coliseum; Level: Super 500; Prize: $400,000; Format: 32MS/32WS/32MD/32WD/32XD	Score:	
15–20 November	Australian Open (Draw): Host: Sydney, Australia; Venue: State Sports Centre; Level: Super 300; Prize: $170,000; Format: 32MS/32WS/32MD/32WD/32XD	(China) Shi Yuqi	(China) Lu Guangzu
15–20 November	Australian Open (Draw): Host: Sydney, Australia; Venue: State Sports Centre; Level: Super 300; Prize: $170,000; Format: 32MS/32WS/32MD/32WD/32XD	Score: 21–19, 18–21, 21–5	
15–20 November	Australian Open (Draw): Host: Sydney, Australia; Venue: State Sports Centre; Level: Super 300; Prize: $170,000; Format: 32MS/32WS/32MD/32WD/32XD	(South Korea) An Se-young	(Indonesia) Gregoria Mariska Tunjung
15–20 November	Australian Open (Draw): Host: Sydney, Australia; Venue: State Sports Centre; Level: Super 300; Prize: $170,000; Format: 32MS/32WS/32MD/32WD/32XD	Score: 21–17, 21–9	
15–20 November	Australian Open (Draw): Host: Sydney, Australia; Venue: State Sports Centre; Level: Super 300; Prize: $170,000; Format: 32MS/32WS/32MD/32WD/32XD	(China) Liu Yuchen (China) Ou Xuanyi	(Malaysia) Ong Yew Sin (Malaysia) Teo Ee Yi
15–20 November	Australian Open (Draw): Host: Sydney, Australia; Venue: State Sports Centre; Level: Super 300; Prize: $170,000; Format: 32MS/32WS/32MD/32WD/32XD	Score: 21–16, 22–20	
15–20 November	Australian Open (Draw): Host: Sydney, Australia; Venue: State Sports Centre; Level: Super 300; Prize: $170,000; Format: 32MS/32WS/32MD/32WD/32XD	(China) Zhang Shuxian (China) Zheng Yu	(Thailand) Benyapa Aimsaard (Thailand) Nuntakarn Aimsaard
15–20 November	Australian Open (Draw): Host: Sydney, Australia; Venue: State Sports Centre; Level: Super 300; Prize: $170,000; Format: 32MS/32WS/32MD/32WD/32XD	Score: 21–19, 21–13	
15–20 November	Australian Open (Draw): Host: Sydney, Australia; Venue: State Sports Centre; Level: Super 300; Prize: $170,000; Format: 32MS/32WS/32MD/32WD/32XD	(South Korea) Seo Seung-jae (South Korea) Chae Yoo-jung	(South Korea) Kim Won-ho (South Korea) Jeong Na-eun
15–20 November	Australian Open (Draw): Host: Sydney, Australia; Venue: State Sports Centre; Level: Super 300; Prize: $170,000; Format: 32MS/32WS/32MD/32WD/32XD	Score: 21–9, 21–17	
22–27 November	New Zealand Open (Draw) (cancelled) (Note: This tournament, originally to be played on 22–27 November, was later cancelled due to the COVID-19 pandemic in New Zealand.): Host: Auckland, New Zealand; Venue: Eventfinda Stadium; Level: Super 300; Prize: $200,000; Format: 32MS/32WS/32MD/32WD/32XD		
22–27 November	New Zealand Open (Draw) (cancelled): Host: Auckland, New Zealand; Venue: Eventfinda Stadium; Level: Super 300; Prize: $200,000; Format: 32MS/32WS/32MD/32WD/32XD	Score:	
22–27 November	New Zealand Open (Draw) (cancelled): Host: Auckland, New Zealand; Venue: Eventfinda Stadium; Level: Super 300; Prize: $200,000; Format: 32MS/32WS/32MD/32WD/32XD	Score:	
22–27 November	New Zealand Open (Draw) (cancelled): Host: Auckland, New Zealand; Venue: Eventfinda Stadium; Level: Super 300; Prize: $200,000; Format: 32MS/32WS/32MD/32WD/32XD	Score:	
22–27 November	New Zealand Open (Draw) (cancelled): Host: Auckland, New Zealand; Venue: Eventfinda Stadium; Level: Super 300; Prize: $200,000; Format: 32MS/32WS/32MD/32WD/32XD	Score:	
22–27 November	New Zealand Open (Draw) (cancelled): Host: Auckland, New Zealand; Venue: Eventfinda Stadium; Level: Super 300; Prize: $200,000; Format: 32MS/32WS/32MD/32WD/32XD	Score:	
29 November – 4 December	China Open (Draw) (cancelled) (Note: This tournament, originally to be played on 29 November – 4 December, was later cancelled due to the COVID-19 pandemic in China.): Host: Changzhou, China; Venue: Xincheng Gymnasium; Level: Super 1000; Prize: $1,100,000; Format: 32MS/32WS/32MD/32WD/32XD		
29 November – 4 December	China Open (Draw) (cancelled): Host: Changzhou, China; Venue: Xincheng Gymnasium; Level: Super 1000; Prize: $1,100,000; Format: 32MS/32WS/32MD/32WD/32XD	Score:	
29 November – 4 December	China Open (Draw) (cancelled): Host: Changzhou, China; Venue: Xincheng Gymnasium; Level: Super 1000; Prize: $1,100,000; Format: 32MS/32WS/32MD/32WD/32XD	Score:	
29 November – 4 December	China Open (Draw) (cancelled): Host: Changzhou, China; Venue: Xincheng Gymnasium; Level: Super 1000; Prize: $1,100,000; Format: 32MS/32WS/32MD/32WD/32XD	Score:	
29 November – 4 December	China Open (Draw) (cancelled): Host: Changzhou, China; Venue: Xincheng Gymnasium; Level: Super 1000; Prize: $1,100,000; Format: 32MS/32WS/32MD/32WD/32XD	Score:	
29 November – 4 December	China Open (Draw) (cancelled): Host: Changzhou, China; Venue: Xincheng Gymnasium; Level: Super 1000; Prize: $1,100,000; Format: 32MS/32WS/32MD/32WD/32XD	Score:	

=== December ===
Date	Tournament	Champions	Runners-up
6–11 December	Fuzhou China Open (Draw) (cancelled) (Note: This tournament, originally to be played on 6–11 December, was later cancelled due to the COVID-19 pandemic in China.): Host: Fuzhou, China; Venue: Haixia Olympic Sports Center; Level: Super 750; Prize: $750,000; Format: 32MS/32WS/32MD/32WD/32XD		
6–11 December	Fuzhou China Open (Draw) (cancelled): Host: Fuzhou, China; Venue: Haixia Olympic Sports Center; Level: Super 750; Prize: $750,000; Format: 32MS/32WS/32MD/32WD/32XD	Score:	
6–11 December	Fuzhou China Open (Draw) (cancelled): Host: Fuzhou, China; Venue: Haixia Olympic Sports Center; Level: Super 750; Prize: $750,000; Format: 32MS/32WS/32MD/32WD/32XD	Score:	
6–11 December	Fuzhou China Open (Draw) (cancelled): Host: Fuzhou, China; Venue: Haixia Olympic Sports Center; Level: Super 750; Prize: $750,000; Format: 32MS/32WS/32MD/32WD/32XD	Score:	
6–11 December	Fuzhou China Open (Draw) (cancelled): Host: Fuzhou, China; Venue: Haixia Olympic Sports Center; Level: Super 750; Prize: $750,000; Format: 32MS/32WS/32MD/32WD/32XD	Score:	
6–11 December	Fuzhou China Open (Draw) (cancelled): Host: Fuzhou, China; Venue: Haixia Olympic Sports Center; Level: Super 750; Prize: $750,000; Format: 32MS/32WS/32MD/32WD/32XD	Score:	
7–11 December	BWF World Tour Finals (Draw): Host: Bangkok, Thailand (Note: This tournament, originally to be played on 14–18 December in Guangzhou, China, was later relocated and rescheduled due to the COVID-19 pandemic in China.); Venue: Nimibutr Arena; Level: World Tour Finals; Prize: $1,500,000; Format: 8MS/8WS/8MD/8WD/8XD	(Denmark) Viktor Axelsen	(Indonesia) Anthony Sinisuka Ginting
7–11 December	BWF World Tour Finals (Draw): Host: Bangkok, Thailand; Venue: Nimibutr Arena; Level: World Tour Finals; Prize: $1,500,000; Format: 8MS/8WS/8MD/8WD/8XD	Score: 21–13, 21–14	
7–11 December	BWF World Tour Finals (Draw): Host: Bangkok, Thailand; Venue: Nimibutr Arena; Level: World Tour Finals; Prize: $1,500,000; Format: 8MS/8WS/8MD/8WD/8XD	(Japan) Akane Yamaguchi	(Chinese Taipei) Tai Tzu-ying
7–11 December	BWF World Tour Finals (Draw): Host: Bangkok, Thailand; Venue: Nimibutr Arena; Level: World Tour Finals; Prize: $1,500,000; Format: 8MS/8WS/8MD/8WD/8XD	Score: 21–18, 22–20	
7–11 December	BWF World Tour Finals (Draw): Host: Bangkok, Thailand; Venue: Nimibutr Arena; Level: World Tour Finals; Prize: $1,500,000; Format: 8MS/8WS/8MD/8WD/8XD	(China) Liu Yuchen (China) Ou Xuanyi	(Indonesia) Mohammad Ahsan (Indonesia) Hendra Setiawan
7–11 December	BWF World Tour Finals (Draw): Host: Bangkok, Thailand; Venue: Nimibutr Arena; Level: World Tour Finals; Prize: $1,500,000; Format: 8MS/8WS/8MD/8WD/8XD	Score: 21–17, 19–21, 21–12	
7–11 December	BWF World Tour Finals (Draw): Host: Bangkok, Thailand; Venue: Nimibutr Arena; Level: World Tour Finals; Prize: $1,500,000; Format: 8MS/8WS/8MD/8WD/8XD	(China) Chen Qingchen (China) Jia Yifan	(Thailand) Benyapa Aimsaard (Thailand) Nuntakarn Aimsaard
7–11 December	BWF World Tour Finals (Draw): Host: Bangkok, Thailand; Venue: Nimibutr Arena; Level: World Tour Finals; Prize: $1,500,000; Format: 8MS/8WS/8MD/8WD/8XD	Score: 21–13, 21–14	
7–11 December	BWF World Tour Finals (Draw): Host: Bangkok, Thailand; Venue: Nimibutr Arena; Level: World Tour Finals; Prize: $1,500,000; Format: 8MS/8WS/8MD/8WD/8XD	(China) Zheng Siwei (China) Huang Yaqiong	(Thailand) Dechapol Puavaranukroh (Thailand) Sapsiree Taerattanachai
7–11 December	BWF World Tour Finals (Draw): Host: Bangkok, Thailand; Venue: Nimibutr Arena; Level: World Tour Finals; Prize: $1,500,000; Format: 8MS/8WS/8MD/8WD/8XD	Score: 21–19, 18–21, 21–13	

== Statistics ==
=== Performance by countries ===
Below are the 2022 BWF World Tour performances by countries. Only countries who have won a title are listed:

BWF World Tour

Rank	Team	BWTF	Super 1000		Super 750				Super 500						Super 300							Total
Rank	Team	THA	ENG	INA	MAS	JPN	DEN	FRA	IND	KOR	THA	INA	MAS	SGP	IND	GER I	SUI	KOR	TPE	GER II	AUS	Total
1	China	3		2	1	1	4	2		1	1	3	2			2		2		1	3	28
2	Indonesia		1		1		1					1	2	3			2			2		13
3	Japan	1	3	1	1	2					2											10
3	South Korea					1				3			1					3			2	10
5	Thailand				1	1			2					1		2				1		8
6	India							1	2					1	2		1					7
7	Malaysia							1		1	1				2	1			1			7
8	Denmark	1	1	1	1			1				1										6
9	Chinese Taipei			1							1								2	1		5
10	Hong Kong																		2			2
11	Singapore								1													1
12	Bulgaria																1					1
12	Germany																1					1

BWF Tour Super 100

Rank	Team	IND	FRA	VIE	CAN	INA	Total
1	Japan			1	2	1	4
2	China			1		2	3
2	India	3					3
2	Indonesia		1	1		1	3
4	France		1		1		2
4	Malaysia	1				1	2
7	Bulgaria		1				1
7	Canada				1		1
7	Chinese Taipei				1		1
7	Netherlands		1				1
7	Singapore		1				1
7	Sri Lanka	1					1
7	Thailand			1			1
7	Vietnam			1			1

=== Performance by categories ===
Tables were calculated after the BWF World Tour Finals.

==== Men's singles ====
Not counting the Syed Modi International, which was not awarded due to both finalists contracted with COVID-19.

Rank	Player	BWTF	1000	750	500	300	100	Total
1	(Denmark) Viktor Axelsen	1	2	2	1			6
2	(China) Shi Yuqi			1		1		2
3	(Indonesia) Anthony Sinisuka Ginting				1	1		2
4	(Japan) Kenta Nishimoto			1				1
5	(China) Weng Hongyang				1			1
5	(India) Lakshya Sen				1			1
5	(Indonesia) Chico Aura Dwi Wardoyo				1			1
5	(Malaysia) Lee Zii Jia				1			1
9	(Chinese Taipei) Chou Tien-chen					1		1
9	(Indonesia) Jonatan Christie					1		1
9	(South Korea) Jeon Hyeok-jin					1		1
9	(Thailand) Kunlavut Vitidsarn					1		1
13	(France) Alex Lanier						1	1
13	(France) Toma Junior Popov						1	1
13	(India) Kiran George						1	1
13	(Japan) Kodai Naraoka						1	1
13	(Malaysia) Leong Jun Hao						1	1

==== Women's singles ====
Rank	Player	BWTF	1000	750	500	300	100	Total
1	(China) He Bingjiao			2		2		4
2	(Japan) Akane Yamaguchi	1	1	1				3
3	(Chinese Taipei) Tai Tzu-ying		1		1	1		3
4	(South Korea) An Se-young				2	1		3
5	(India) P. V. Sindhu				1	2		3
6	(Thailand) Ratchanok Intanon			1				1
7	(China) Chen Yufei				1			1
7	(Thailand) Busanan Ongbamrungphan				1			1
9	(China) Han Yue					1		1
10	(Canada) Michelle Li						1	1
10	(China) Gao Fangjie						1	1
10	(India) Unnati Hooda						1	1
10	(Indonesia) Putri Kusuma Wardani						1	1
10	(Vietnam) Nguyễn Thùy Linh						1	1

==== Men's doubles ====
Rank	Player	BWTF	1000	750	500	300	100	Total
1	(Indonesia) Fajar Alfian			1	2	1		4
1	(Indonesia) Muhammad Rian Ardianto			1	2	1		4
3	(China) Liu Yuchen	1	1			1		3
3	(China) Ou Xuanyi	1	1			1		3
5	(India) Satwiksairaj Rankireddy			1	1			2
5	(India) Chirag Shetty			1	1			2
5	(Japan) Takuro Hoki			1	1			2
5	(Japan) Yugo Kobayashi			1	1			2
9	(Malaysia) Man Wei Chong					2		2
9	(Malaysia) Tee Kai Wun					2		2
11	(Indonesia) Muhammad Shohibul Fikri		1					1
11	(Indonesia) Bagas Maulana		1					1
13	(China) Liang Weikeng			1				1
13	(China) Wang Chang			1				1
15	(Indonesia) Leo Rolly Carnando				1			1
15	(Indonesia) Daniel Marthin				1			1
15	(South Korea) Kang Min-hyuk				1			1
15	(South Korea) Seo Seung-jae				1			1
19	(Chinese Taipei) Lu Ching-yao					1		1
19	(Chinese Taipei) Yang Po-han					1		1
19	(Malaysia) Goh Sze Fei					1		1
19	(Malaysia) Nur Izzuddin					1		1
19	(South Korea) Kim Gi-jung					1		1
19	(South Korea) Kim Sa-rang					1		1
25	(China) Ren Xiangyu						1	1
25	(China) Tan Qiang						1	1
25	(Indonesia) Rahmat Hidayat						1	1
25	(Indonesia) Pramudya Kusumawardana						1	1
25	(Japan) Ayato Endo						1	1
25	(Japan) Yuta Takei						1	1
25	(Malaysia) Nur Mohd Azriyn Ayub						1	1
25	(Malaysia) Lim Khim Wah						1	1
25	(Netherlands) Ruben Jille						1	1
25	(Netherlands) Ties van der Lecq						1	1

==== Women's doubles ====
Rank	Player	BWTF	1000	750	500	300	100	Total
1	(China) Chen Qingchen	1		1	2	1		5
1	(China) Jia Yifan	1		1	2	1		5
3	(Japan) Nami Matsuyama		2		1			3
3	(Japan) Chiharu Shida		2		1			3
5	(Thailand) Benyapa Aimsaard				1	1	1	3
5	(Thailand) Nuntakarn Aimsaard				1	1	1	3
7	(Indonesia) Apriyani Rahayu			1	1			2
7	(Indonesia) Siti Fadia Silva Ramadhanti			1	1			2
7	(South Korea) Jeong Na-eun			1	1			2
7	(South Korea) Kim Hye-jeong			1	1			2
11	(Bulgaria) Gabriela Stoeva					1	1	2
11	(Bulgaria) Stefani Stoeva					1	1	2
13	(Malaysia) Pearly Tan			1				1
13	(Malaysia) Thinaah Muralitharan			1				1
15	(China) Zhang Shuxian					1		1
15	(China) Zheng Yu					1		1
15	(Hong Kong) Ng Tsz Yau					1		1
15	(Hong Kong) Tsang Hiu Yan					1		1
15	(Malaysia) Anna Cheong					1		1
15	(Malaysia) Teoh Mei Xing					1		1
15	(South Korea) Kim So-yeong					1		1
15	(South Korea) Kong Hee-yong					1		1
23	(India) Gayatri Gopichand						1	1
23	(India) Treesa Jolly						1	1
23	(Japan) Rui Hirokami						1	1
23	(Japan) Yuna Kato						1	1
23	(Japan) Rena Miyaura						1	1
23	(Japan) Ayako Sakuramoto						1	1

==== Mixed doubles ====
Rank	Player	BWTF	1000	750	500	300	100	Total
1	(China) Huang Yaqiong	1	1	3	3			8
1	(China) Zheng Siwei	1	1	3	3			8
3	(Thailand) Dechapol Puavaranukroh			1	1	1		3
3	(Thailand) Sapsiree Taerattanachai			1	1	1		3
5	(Singapore) Terry Hee				1		1	2
5	(Singapore) Tan Wei Han				1		1	2
7	(Japan) Arisa Higashino		1					1
7	(Japan) Yuta Watanabe		1					1
9	(Malaysia) Lai Pei Jing				1			1
9	(Malaysia) Tan Kian Meng				1			1
11	(China) Huang Dongping					1		1
11	(China) Wang Yilyu					1		1
11	(Germany) Mark Lamsfuß					1		1
11	(Germany) Isabel Lohau					1		1
11	(Hong Kong) Lee Chun Hei					1		1
11	(Hong Kong) Ng Tsz Yau					1		1
11	(India) Ishaan Bhatnagar					1		1
11	(India) Tanisha Crasto					1		1
11	(Indonesia) Rehan Naufal Kusharjanto					1		1
11	(Indonesia) Lisa Ayu Kusumawati					1		1
11	(South Korea) Chae Yoo-jung					1		1
11	(South Korea) Seo Seung-jae					1		1
25	(China) Jiang Zhenbang						1	1
25	(China) Wei Yaxin						1	1
25	(Chinese Taipei) Lee Chia-hsin						1	1
25	(Chinese Taipei) Ye Hong-wei						1	1
25	(Indonesia) Dejan Ferdinansyah						1	1
25	(Indonesia) Gloria Emanuelle Widjaja						1	1
25	(Sri Lanka) Sachin Dias						1	1
25	(Sri Lanka) Thilini Hendahewa						1	1

== World Tour Finals rankings ==
The points are calculated from the following levels:

- BWF World Tour Super 1000,
- BWF World Tour Super 750,
- BWF World Tour Super 500,
- BWF World Tour Super 300,
- BWF Tour Super 100.

Information on Points, Won, Lost, and % columns were calculated after the 2022 Australian Open.

Key

(D)C	(Defending) Champion
F	Finalists
SF	Semi-finalists
QF	Quarter-finalists
#R	Round 1/2/3
RR	Round Robin
Q#	Qualification Round 1/2

=== Men's singles ===
The table below was based on the ranking of men's singles as of 22 November 2022.

Rank		WR	Player	IND	IND	IND	GER	ENG	SUI	FRA	KOR	KOR	THA	INA	INA	MAS	MAS	SGP	TPE	JPN	CAN	VIE	INA	DEN	FRA	GER	AUS	TP	Points	THA		Won	Lost	%
Rank		WR	Player	500	300	100	300	1000	300	100	500	300	500	500	1000	750	500	500	300	750	100	100	100	750	750	300	300	TP	Points	Eligibility	BWTF	Won	Lost	%
1	Steady	1	(Denmark) Viktor Axelsen	–	–	–	SF	C	2R	–	–	–	2R	C	DC	C	–	–	–	–	–	–	–	QF	C	–	–	9	72,500	Yes	DC	36	3	92.31%
2	Steady	4	(Chinese Taipei) Chou Tien-chen	–	–	–	–	SF	–	–	–	–	1R	F	2R	2R	QF	2R	DC	F	–	–	–	QF	1R	F	–	12	67,190	Yes	RR	23	10	69.70%
3	Steady	12	(India) Prannoy H. S.	QF	QF	–	QF	1R	F	–	1R	–	1R	–	SF	QF	SF	QF	–	QF	–	–	–	2R	2R	–	–	14	66,730	Yes	RR	23	14	62.16%
4	Steady	5	(Indonesia) Jonatan Christie	–	–	–	2R	QF	C	–	F	–	–	1R	2R	SF	1R	2R	–	2R	–	–	–	QF	QF	QF	–	13	64,960	Yes	SF	23	12	65.71%
5	▲1	14	(Japan) Kodai Naraoka	–	–	–	–	–	–	–	2R	F	SF	Q1	−	−	−	F	F	2R	–	C	–	SF	SF	2R	SF	12	63,020	Yes	SF	30	10	75.00%
6	▲2	17	(China) Lu Guangzu	–	–	–	2R	QF	–	–	–	QF	1R	QF	2R	QF	SF	1R	–	2R	–	–	–	2R	QF	1R	F	14	62,260	Yes	RR	20	13	60.61%
7	▼2	7	(Indonesia) Anthony Sinisuka Ginting	–	–	–	2R	QF	SF	–	1R	–	–	SF	QF	QF	QF	C	–	–	–	–	–	1R	1R	C	–	12	62,100	Yes	F	24	10	70.59%
8	▼1	3	(Singapore) Loh Kean Yew	F	–	–	1R	1R	–	–	–	–	–	SF	QF	1R	–	SF	–	2R	–	–	–	SF	QF	QF	QF	12	60,340	Yes	RR	22	12	64.71%

=== Women's singles ===
The table below was based on the ranking of women's singles as of 22 November 2022.

Rank		WR	Player	IND	IND	IND	GER	ENG	SUI	FRA	KOR	KOR	THA	INA	INA	MAS	MAS	SGP	TPE	JPN	CAN	VIE	INA	DEN	FRA	GER	AUS	TP	Points	THA		Won	Lost	%
Rank		WR	Player	500	300	100	300	1000	300	100	500	300	500	500	1000	750	500	500	300	750	100	100	100	750	750	300	300	TP	Points	Eligibility	BWTF	Won	Lost	%
1	Steady	4	(China) Chen Yufei	–	–	–	F	SF	–	–	2R	F	F	C	SF	F	F	–	–	SF	–	–	–	F	2R	–	–	12	87,820	Yes	SF	38	11	77.55%
2	Steady	3	(Chinese Taipei) Tai Tzu-ying	–	–	–	2R	SF	–	–	–	–	C	–	C	SF	SF	2R	C	SF	–	–	–	QF	SF	–	–	11	78,520	Yes	F	34	7	82.93%
3	Steady	5	(China) He Bingjiao	–	–	–	C	QF	–	–	–	C	QF	SF	SF	1R	1R	2R	–	2R	–	–	–	C	C	–	–	12	75,260	Yes	SF	31	7	81.58%
4	▲2	2	(South Korea) An Se-young	–	–	–	SF	F	–	–	C	SF	1R	2R	QF	2R	C	–	–	F	–	–	–	–	–	–	C	11	71,490	Yes	RR	33	8	80.49%
5	▼1	6	(India) P. V. Sindhu	SF	C	–	2R	2R	C	–	SF	–	SF	QF	1R	QF	QF	C	–	–	–	–	–	–	–	–	–	11	69,140	No	–	27	9	78.05%
6	▲2	12	(China) Han Yue	–	–	–	2R	2R	–	–	1R	1R	1R	SF	1R	QF	1R	QF	–	2R	–	–	–	SF	QF	C	SF	15	66,360	No	–	23	14	62.16%
7	▼2	7	(Thailand) Ratchanok Intanon	–	–	–	QF	–	–	–	QF	–	SF	F	2R	C	QF	1R	–	QF	–	–	–	SF	QF	–	–	11	65,970	Yes	RR	26	9	74.29%
8	▼1	10	(Thailand) Busanan Ongbamrungphan	C	–	–	1R	2R	F	–	QF	–	1R	QF	2R	2R	1R	1R	–	1R	–	–	–	1R	QF	2R	–	15	61,600	Yes	RR	18	14	56.25%
9	Steady	8	(China) Wang Zhiyi	–	–	–	1R	1R	–	–	2R	SF	2R	1R	F	SF	2R	F	–	2R	–	–	–	2R	2R	–	–	13	61,250	No	–	20	13	60.61%
10	Steady	1	(Japan) Akane Yamaguchi	–	–	–	2R	C	–	–	–	–	QF	–	QF	1R	QF	–	–	DC	–	–	–	QF	SF	–	–	9	58,840	Yes	C	22	7	75.86%
11	Steady	27	(Thailand) Supanida Katethong	F	QF	–	2R	1R	SF	–	1R	QF	–	2R	1R	–	–	–	2R	2R	–	–	–	1R	2R	1R	2R	15	53,440	No	–	17	15	53.13%
12	▲2	9	(Thailand) Pornpawee Chochuwong	–	–	–	–	–	–	–	F	1R	–	2R	1R	1R	2R	QF	–	QF	–	–	–	QF	1R	2R	SF	12	49,780	No	–	16	12	57.14%
13	▲4	18	(Indonesia) Gregoria Mariska Tunjung	–	–	–	–	1R	–	–	–	–	–	2R	1R	2R	SF	QF	–	QF	–	–	–	1R	1R	SF	F	11	47,600	Yes	RR	16	11	59.26%

=== Men's doubles ===
The table below was based on the ranking of men's doubles as of 22 November 2022.

Rank		WR	Player	IND	IND	IND	GER	ENG	SUI	FRA	KOR	KOR	THA	INA	INA	MAS	MAS	SGP	TPE	JPN	CAN	VIE	INA	DEN	FRA	GER	AUS	TP	Points	THA		Won	Lost	%
Rank		WR	Player	500	300	100	300	1000	300	100	500	300	500	500	1000	750	500	500	300	750	100	100	100	750	750	300	300	TP	Points	Eligibility	BWTF	Won	Lost	%
1	Steady	3	(Indonesia) Fajar Alfian	–	–	–	2R	1R	C	–	F	–	F	C	QF	F	C	F	–	QF	–	–	–	C	2R	–	–	13	91,870	Yes	SF	42	9	82.35%
1	Steady	3	(Indonesia) Muhammad Rian Ardianto	–	–	–	2R	1R	C	–	F	–	F	C	QF	F	C	F	–	QF	–	–	–	C	2R	–	–	13	91,870	Yes	SF	42	9	82.35%
2	Steady	6	(Indonesia) Mohammad Ahsan	F	–	–	–	F	1R	–	SF	–	QF	2R	1R	QF	F	SF	–	2R	–	–	–	2R	1R	–	–	13	69,300	Yes	F	25	13	65.79%
2	Steady	6	(Indonesia) Hendra Setiawan	F	–	–	–	F	1R	–	SF	–	QF	2R	1R	QF	F	SF	–	2R	–	–	–	2R	1R	–	–	13	69,300	Yes	F	25	13	65.79%
3	Steady	8	(Malaysia) Ong Yew Sin	SF	–	–	QF	2R	QF	–	QF	–	–	1R	2R	QF	–	2R	–	QF	–	–	–	SF	QF	–	F	13	66,380	Yes	SF	23	13	63.89%
3	Steady	8	(Malaysia) Teo Ee Yi	SF	–	–	QF	2R	QF	–	QF	–	–	1R	2R	QF	–	2R	–	QF	–	–	–	SF	QF	–	F	13	66,380	Yes	SF	23	13	63.89%
4	▲3	11	(China) Liu Yuchen	–	–	–	F	–	–	–	–	F	–	2R	C	QF	1R	1R	–	QF	–	–	–	2R	2R	2R	C	11	62,430	Yes	C	26	9	74.29%
4	▲3	11	(China) Ou Xuanyi	–	–	–	F	–	–	–	–	F	–	2R	C	QF	1R	1R	–	QF	–	–	–	2R	2R	2R	C	11	62,430	Yes	C	26	9	74.29%
5	▼1	13	(Indonesia) Muhammad Shohibul Fikri	–	–	–	–	C	1R	–	SF	QF	2R	1R	2R	2R	1R	1R	–	2R	–	–	–	2R	QF	1R	–	13	59,680	No	–	16	12	57.14%
5	▼1	13	(Indonesia) Bagas Maulana	–	–	–	–	C	1R	–	SF	QF	2R	1R	2R	2R	1R	1R	–	2R	–	–	–	2R	QF	1R	–	13	59,680	No	–	16	12	57.14%
6	▼1	5	(Denmark) Kim Astrup	–	–	–	SF	QF	QF	–	–	–	SF	2R	SF	1R	1R	–	–	F	–	–	–	1R	1R	SF	–	12	58,220	Yes	RR	21	12	63.64%
6	▼1	5	(Denmark) Anders Skaarup Rasmussen	–	–	–	SF	QF	QF	–	–	–	SF	2R	SF	1R	1R	–	–	F	–	–	–	1R	1R	SF	–	12	58,220	Yes	RR	21	12	63.64%
7	▼1	1	(Japan) Takuro Hoki	–	–	–	QF	QF	–	–	–	–	C	–	QF	C	QF	–	–	1R	–	–	–	1R	QF	QF	–	10	57,510	Yes	RR	21	8	72.41%
7	▼1	1	(Japan) Yugo Kobayashi	–	–	–	QF	QF	–	–	–	–	C	–	QF	C	QF	–	–	1R	–	–	–	1R	QF	QF	–	10	57,510	Yes	RR	21	8	72.41%
8	▲2	15	(South Korea) Choi Sol-gyu	–	–	–	–	–	–	–	QF	SF	–	1R	F	QF	2R	–	–	SF	–	–	–	2R	SF	–	2R	10	54,480	Yes	RR	20	10	66.67%
8	▲2	15	(South Korea) Kim Won-ho	–	–	–	–	–	–	–	QF	SF	–	1R	F	QF	2R	–	–	SF	–	–	–	2R	SF	–	2R	10	54,480	Yes	RR	20	10	66.67%
9	▼1	4	(Malaysia) Aaron Chia	–	–	–	–	2R	SF	–	–	–	SF	QF	SF	SF	SF	–	–	–	–	–	–	SF	1R	–	–	9	54,040	Yes	RR	21	9	70.00%
9	▼1	4	(Malaysia) Soh Wooi Yik	–	–	–	–	2R	SF	–	–	–	SF	QF	SF	SF	SF	–	–	–	–	–	–	SF	1R	–	–	9	54,040	Yes	RR	21	9	70.00%

=== Women's doubles ===
The table below was based on the ranking of women's doubles as of 22 November 2022.

Rank		WR	Player	IND	IND	IND	GER	ENG	SUI	FRA	KOR	KOR	THA	INA	INA	MAS	MAS	SGP	TPE	JPN	CAN	VIE	INA	DEN	FRA	GER	AUS	TP	Points	THA		Won	Lost	%
Rank		WR	Player	500	300	100	300	1000	300	100	500	300	500	500	1000	750	500	500	300	750	100	100	100	750	750	300	300	TP	Points	Eligibility	BWTF	Won	Lost	%
1	Steady	5	(South Korea) Jeong Na-eun	–	–	–	QF	SF	–	–	C	–	2R	SF	QF	SF	SF	–	–	C	–	–	–	1R	QF	–	SF	12	76,800	Yes	SF	29	10	74.36%
1	Steady	5	(South Korea) Kim Hye-jeong	–	–	–	QF	SF	–	–	C	–	2R	SF	QF	SF	SF	–	–	C	–	–	–	1R	QF	–	SF	12	76,800	Yes	SF	29	10	74.36%
2	▲1	7	(China) Zhang Shuxian	–	–	–	SF	F	–	–	–	QF	SF	1R	2R	F	1R	F	–	2R	–	–	–	QF	1R	SF	C	14	76,690	Yes	SF	32	13	71.11%
2	▲1	7	(China) Zheng Yu	–	–	–	SF	F	–	–	–	QF	SF	1R	2R	F	1R	F	–	2R	–	–	–	QF	1R	SF	C	14	76,690	Yes	SF	32	13	71.11%
3	▲1	13	(Thailand) Benyapa Aimsaard	C	–	–	2R	1R	QF	–	F	–	–	2R	1R	1R	1R	2R	–	1R	–	C	–	2R	2R	C	F	16	71,430	Yes	F	31	15	67.39%
3	▲1	13	(Thailand) Nuntakarn Aimsaard	C	–	–	2R	1R	QF	–	F	–	–	2R	1R	1R	1R	2R	–	1R	–	C	–	2R	2R	C	F	16	71,430	Yes	F	31	15	67.39%
4	▼2	1	(China) Chen Qingchen	–	–	–	C	1R	–	–	–	–	QF	C	QF	QF	C	–	–	SF	–	–	–	C	QF	–	–	10	70,840	Yes	C	36	6	85.71%
4	▼2	1	(China) Jia Yifan	–	–	–	C	1R	–	–	–	–	QF	C	QF	QF	C	–	–	SF	–	–	–	C	QF	–	–	10	70,840	Yes	C	36	6	85.71%
5	▲1	2	(Japan) Nami Matsuyama	–	–	–	2R	C	–	–	–	–	C	–	DC	2R	F	–	–	1R	–	–	–	SF	QF	–	2R	10	67,230	No	–	27	6	81.82%
5	▲1	2	(Japan) Chiharu Shida	–	–	–	2R	C	–	–	–	–	C	–	DC	2R	F	–	–	1R	–	–	–	SF	QF	–	2R	10	67,230	No	–	27	6	81.82%
6	▼1	6	(Thailand) Jongkolphan Kititharakul	–	–	–	SF	QF	SF	–	–	–	–	QF	SF	1R	2R	QF	–	QF	–	–	–	SF	2R	F	–	12	65,160	Yes	RR	25	11	69.44%
6	▼1	6	(Thailand) Rawinda Prajongjai	–	–	–	SF	QF	SF	–	–	–	–	QF	SF	1R	2R	QF	–	QF	–	–	–	SF	2R	F	–	12	65,160	Yes	RR	25	11	69.44%
7	Steady	24	(Malaysia) Vivian Hoo	QF	QF	–	QF	1R	SF	–	1R	–	2R	2R	2R	1R	1R	2R	–	2R	–	–	–	1R	1R	2R	–	16	57,110	Yes	RR	14	16	46.67%
7	Steady	24	(Malaysia) Lim Chiew Sien	QF	QF	–	QF	1R	SF	–	1R	–	2R	2R	2R	1R	1R	2R	–	2R	–	–	–	1R	1R	2R	–	16	57,110	Yes	RR	14	16	46.67%
8	Steady	9	(Malaysia) Pearly Tan	–	–	–	1R	QF	–	–	–	–	SF	SF	2R	2R	SF	–	–	2R	–	–	–	2R	C	–	–	10	56,290	Yes	RR	20	9	68.97%
8	Steady	9	(Malaysia) Thinaah Muralitharan	–	–	–	1R	QF	–	–	–	–	SF	SF	2R	2R	SF	–	–	2R	–	–	–	2R	C	–	–	10	56,290	Yes	RR	20	9	68.97%
9	Steady	14	(Indonesia) Apriyani Rahayu	–	–	–	–	–	–	–	–	–	–	F	QF	C	QF	C	–	QF	–	–	–	QF	1R	–	–	8	54,400	Yes	RR	22	6	78.57%
9	Steady	14	(Indonesia) Siti Fadia Silva Ramadhanti	–	–	–	–	–	–	–	–	–	–	F	QF	C	QF	C	–	QF	–	–	–	QF	1R	–	–	8	54,400	Yes	RR	22	6	78.57%

=== Mixed doubles ===
The table below was based on the ranking of mixed doubles as of 15 November 2022.

Rank		WR	Player	IND	IND	IND	GER	ENG	SUI	FRA	KOR	KOR	THA	INA	INA	MAS	MAS	SGP	TPE	JPN	CAN	VIE	INA	DEN	FRA	GER	AUS	TP	Points	THA		Won	Lost	%
Rank		WR	Player	500	300	100	300	1000	300	100	500	300	500	500	1000	750	500	500	300	750	100	100	100	750	750	300	300	TP	Points	Eligibility	BWTF	Won	Lost	%
1	Steady	3	(China) Zheng Siwei	–	–	–	–	SF	–	–	–	–	C	C	C	DC	DC	–	–	SF	–	–	–	C	C	–	–	9	88,700	Yes	C	45	2	95.74%
1	Steady	3	(China) Huang Yaqiong	–	–	–	–	SF	–	–	–	–	C	C	C	DC	DC	–	–	SF	–	–	–	C	C	–	–	9	88,700	Yes	C	45	2	95.74%
2	Steady	1	(Thailand) Dechapol Puavaranukroh	–	–	–	C	SF	–	–	–	–	F	1R	1R	F	2R	DC	–	C	–	–	–	2R	1R	–	–	11	68,550	Yes	F	32	9	78.05%
2	Steady	1	(Thailand) Sapsiree Taerattanachai	–	–	–	C	SF	–	–	–	–	F	1R	1R	F	2R	DC	–	C	–	–	–	2R	1R	–	–	11	68,550	Yes	F	32	9	78.05%
3	Steady	4	(China) Wang Yilyu	–	–	–	2R	F	–	–	–	C	SF	QF	SF	SF	QF	F	–	SF	–	–	–	–	–	–	–	9	68,050	Yes	RR	31	10	75.61%
3	Steady	4	(China) Huang Dongping	–	–	–	2R	F	–	–	–	C	SF	QF	SF	SF	QF	F	–	SF	–	–	–	–	–	–	–	9	68,050	Yes	RR	31	10	75.61%
4	Steady	11	(Malaysia) Goh Soon Huat	–	–	–	1R	1R	F	–	2R	SF	QF	1R	2R	2R	QF	SF	–	2R	–	–	–	SF	1R	2R	–	15	63,010	Yes	RR	19	15	55.88%
4	Steady	11	(Malaysia) Shevon Jemie Lai	–	–	–	1R	1R	F	–	2R	SF	QF	1R	2R	2R	QF	SF	–	2R	–	–	–	SF	1R	2R	–	15	63,010	Yes	RR	19	15	55.88%
5	Steady	8	(Malaysia) Tan Kian Meng	SF	–	–	QF	QF	SF	–	C	–	1R	1R	1R	1R	–	–	–	QF	–	–	–	2R	2R	1R	–	13	57,430	Yes	SF	19	12	61.29%
5	Steady	8	(Malaysia) Lai Pei Jing	SF	–	–	QF	QF	SF	–	C	–	1R	1R	1R	1R	–	–	–	QF	–	–	–	2R	2R	1R	–	13	57,430	Yes	SF	19	12	61.29%
6	Steady	13	(Indonesia) Rinov Rivaldy	–	–	–	QF	1R	1R	–	SF	2R	–	QF	1R	2R	F	2R	–	2R	–	–	–	1R	2R	QF	–	13	56,600	Yes	SF	13	13	50.00%
6	Steady	13	(Indonesia) Pitha Haningtyas Mentari	–	–	–	QF	1R	1R	–	SF	2R	–	QF	1R	2R	F	2R	–	2R	–	–	–	1R	2R	QF	–	13	56,600	Yes	SF	13	13	50.00%
7	Steady	10	(France) Thom Gicquel	–	–	–	QF	QF	QF	–	–	–	–	F	QF	QF	–	–	–	2R	–	–	–	QF	QF	SF	–	10	56,070	Yes	RR	22	10	68.75%
7	Steady	10	(France) Delphine Delrue	–	–	–	QF	QF	QF	–	–	–	–	F	QF	QF	–	–	–	2R	–	–	–	QF	QF	SF	–	10	56,070	Yes	RR	22	10	68.75%
8	Steady	2	(Japan) Yuta Watanabe	–	–	–	1R	DC	–	–	–	–	SF	–	F	1R	QF	–	–	F	–	–	–	QF	–	–	–	8	53,390	No	–	20	7	74.07%
8	Steady	2	(Japan) Arisa Higashino	–	–	–	1R	DC	–	–	–	–	SF	–	F	1R	QF	–	–	F	–	–	–	QF	–	–	–	8	53,390	No	–	20	7	74.07%
9	Steady	12	(Thailand) Supak Jomkoh	–	–	–	2R	2R	–	–	–	–	QF	SF	2R	2R	SF	2R	–	2R	–	–	–	SF	1R	–	–	11	52,830	Yes	RR	15	11	57.69%
9	Steady	12	(Thailand) Supissara Paewsampran	–	–	–	2R	2R	–	–	–	–	QF	SF	2R	2R	SF	2R	–	2R	–	–	–	SF	1R	–	–	11	52,830	Yes	RR	15	11	57.69%
