= 2022 Malaysia Masters =

Badminton tournament in Malaysia

Tournament details
- Dates: 5–10 July
- Level: Super 500
- Total prize money: US$360,000
- Venue: Axiata Arena
- Location: Kuala Lumpur, Malaysia

Champions
- Men's singles: (Indonesia) Chico Aura Dwi Wardoyo
- Women's singles: (South Korea) An Se-young
- Men's doubles: (Indonesia) Fajar Alfian (Indonesia) Muhammad Rian Ardianto
- Women's doubles: (China) Chen Qingchen (China) Jia Yifan
- Mixed doubles: (China) Zheng Siwei (China) Huang Yaqiong

The 2022 Malaysia Masters (officially known as the Perodua Malaysia Masters 2022 presented by Daihatsu for sponsorship reasons) was a badminton tournament that took place at the Axiata Arena, Kuala Lumpur, Malaysia, from 5 to 10 July 2022 and had a total prize of US$360,000.

== Tournament ==
The 2022 Malaysia Masters was the thirteenth tournament of the 2022 BWF World Tour and was part of the Malaysia Masters championships, which had been held since 2009. This tournament was organized by the Badminton Association of Malaysia with sanction from the BWF.

=== Venue ===
This international tournament was held at the Axiata Arena inside the KL Sports City in Kuala Lumpur, Malaysia.

=== Point distribution ===
Below is the point distribution table for each phase of the tournament based on the BWF points system for the BWF World Tour Super 500 event.

Winner	Runner-up	3/4	5/8	9/16	17/32	33/64	65/128
9,200	7,800	6,420	5,040	3,600	2,220	880	430

=== Prize pool ===
The total prize money was US$360,000 with the distribution of the prize money in accordance with BWF regulations.

Event	Winner	Finalist	Semi-finals	Quarter-finals	Last 16
Singles	$27,000	$13,680	$5,220	$2,160	$1,260
Doubles	$28,440	$13,680	$5,040	$2,610	$1,350

== Men's singles ==
=== Seeds ===
1. (Denmark) Viktor Axelsen (withdrew)
2. (Japan) Kento Momota (second round)
3. (Denmark) Anders Antonsen (withdrew)
4. (Chinese Taipei) Chou Tien-chen (quarter-finals)
5. (Malaysia) Lee Zii Jia (withdrew)
6. (Indonesia) Anthony Sinisuka Ginting (quarter-finals)
7. (Indonesia) Jonatan Christie (first round)
8. (Hong Kong) Ng Ka Long (final)

=== Finals ===
Semi-finals
(China) Lu Guangzu	22	21	19
PFQ	(Indonesia) Chico Aura Dwi Wardoyo	20	23	21
8	(Hong Kong) Ng Ka Long	17	21	21
(India) Prannoy H. S.	21	9	17

Final
PFQ	(Indonesia) Chico Aura Dwi Wardoyo	22	21
8	(Hong Kong) Ng Ka Long	20	15

=== Top half ===
==== Section 1 ====
First round
PFQ	(Republic of Ireland) N Nguyen	21	21
Q1	(China) Sun FX	7	17
(Thailand) K Vitidsarn
(China) Lu GZ	w	/	o
PFQ	(China) Li SF	21	21
Q3	(Malaysia) Soong J V	14	12
(Guatemala) K Cordón	8	9
(India) B. Sai Praneeth	21	21

Second round
PFQ	(Republic of Ireland) N Nguyen	10	10
(China) Lu GZ	21	21
PFQ	(China) Li SF	21	21
(India) B. Sai Praneeth	14	17

Quarter-finals
(China) Lu GZ	21	21
PFQ	(China) Li SF	14	16

==== Section 2 ====
First round
PFQ	(Indonesia) C A Dwi Wardoyo	21	17	21
(Hong Kong) Lee C Y	16	21	19
(Thailand) K Wangcharoen	21	21
Q2	(Malaysia) Leong J H	12	18
6	(Indonesia) A S Ginting	8	21	22
(Japan) K Nishimoto	21	14	20
(Indonesia) T Sugiarto	21	16	16
PFQ	(India) Parupalli K	16	21	21

Second round
PFQ	(Indonesia) C A Dwi Wardoyo	18	21	21
(Thailand) K Wangcharoen	21	11	9
6	(Indonesia) A S Ginting	21	21
PFQ	(India) Parupalli K	10	15

Quarter-finals
PFQ	(Indonesia) C A Dwi Wardoyo	11	21	21
6	(Indonesia) A S Ginting	21	16	17

=== Bottom half ===
==== Section 3 ====
First round
(Netherlands) M Caljouw	21	21
(South Korea) Heo K-h	17	16
(Malaysia) Liew D	17	15
8	(Hong Kong) Ng K L	21	21
Q4	(Malaysia) Ng T Y	21	21
(Canada) B Yang	15	15
(India) Sa Verma	21	12	14
4	(Chinese Taipei) Chou T-c	10	21	21

Second round
(Netherlands) M Caljouw	11	5
8	(Hong Kong) Ng K L	21	21
Q4	(Malaysia) Ng T Y	18	16
4	(Chinese Taipei) Chou T-c	21	21

Quarter-finals
8	(Hong Kong) Ng K L	13	21	21
4	(Chinese Taipei) Chou T-c	21	12	13

==== Section 4 ====
First round
(India) Prannoy H. S.	21	21
PFQ	(France) B Leverdez	19	14
(Chinese Taipei) Wang T-w	16	21	27
7	(Indonesia) J Christie	21	18	25
(Japan) K Tsuneyama	21	21
(China) Zhao JP	16	16
PFQ	(Japan) K Watanabe	18	13
2	(Japan) K Momota	21	21

Second round
(India) Prannoy H. S.	21	21
(Chinese Taipei) Wang T-w	19	16
(Japan) K Tsuneyama	21	21
2	(Japan) K Momota	15	16

Quarter-finals
(India) Prannoy H. S.	25	22
(Japan) K Tsuneyama	23	20

== Women's singles ==
=== Seeds ===
1. (Japan) Akane Yamaguchi (quarter-finals)
2. (Chinese Taipei) Tai Tzu-ying (semi-finals)
3. (South Korea) An Se-young (champion)
4. (China) Chen Yufei (final)
5. (Spain) Carolina Marín (withdrew)
6. (Japan) Nozomi Okuhara (quarter-finals)
7. (India) P. V. Sindhu (quarter-finals)
8. (Thailand) Ratchanok Intanon (quarter-finals)

=== Finals ===
Semi-finals
(Indonesia) Gregoria Mariska Tunjung	18	21	8
3	(South Korea) An Se-young	21	13	21
4	(China) Chen Yufei	21	23
2	(Chinese Taipei) Tai Tzu-ying	13	21

Final
3	(South Korea) An Se-young	21	21
4	(China) Chen Yufei	17	5

=== Top half ===
==== Section 1 ====
First round
1	(Japan) A Yamaguchi	21	21
(Canada) M Li	15	13
(China) Han Y	19	16
(China) Wang ZY	21	21
PFQ	(France) Qi XF	10	10
(Indonesia) G M Tunjung	21	21
(South Korea) Kim G-e	16	21	21
(India) S Nehwal	21	17	14

Second round
1	(Japan) A Yamaguchi	12	21	21
(China) Wang ZY	21	13	12
(Indonesia) G M Tunjung	21	21
(South Korea) Kim G-e	11	9

Quarter-finals
1	(Japan) A Yamaguchi	23	21	10
(Indonesia) G M Tunjung	25	15	21

==== Section 2 ====
First round
3	(South Korea) An S-y	21	21
(United States) I Wang	18	13
(Denmark) J D Jakobsen	14	21	21
Q1	(Myanmar) Thet Htar T	21	10	10
8	(Thailand) R Intanon	21	21
(Thailand) B Ongbamrungphan	12	13
PFQ	(Indonesia) Fitriani	19	21	21
Q3	(Estonia) K Kuuba	21	18	12

Second round
3	(South Korea) An S-y	21	21
(Denmark) J D Jakobsen	11	13
8	(Thailand) R Intanon	21	21
PFQ	(Indonesia) Fitriani	6	15

Quarter-finals
3	(South Korea) An S-y	13	21	21
8	(Thailand) R Intanon	21	13	12

=== Bottom half ===
==== Section 3 ====
First round
(Denmark) L Christophersen	13	21	14
(Thailand) P Chaiwan	21	18	21
(Germany) Y Li	9	19
6	(Japan) N Okuhara	21	21
(Thailand) P Chochuwong	21	21
(Denmark) L Kjærsfeldt	11	18
(Belgium) L Tan	17	11
4	(China) Chen YF	21	21

Second round
(Thailand) P Chaiwan	21	17	12
6	(Japan) N Okuhara	16	21	21
(Thailand) P Chochuwong	19	13
4	(China) Chen YF	21	21

Quarter-finals
6	(Japan) N Okuhara	18	20
4	(China) Chen YF	21	22

==== Section 4 ====
First round
Q2	(Indonesia) P K Wardani	21	14
(China) Zhang YM	23	21
(China) He BJ	13	21	15
7	(India) P. V. Sindhu	21	17	21
Q4	(Malaysia) Goh J W	21	21
(United States) BW Zhang	19	18
PFQ	(South Korea) Sim Y-j	11	8
2	(Chinese Taipei) Tai T-y	21	21

Second round
(China) Zhang YM	12	10
7	(India) P. V. Sindhu	21	21
Q4	(Malaysia) Goh J W	21	7	9
2	(Chinese Taipei) Tai T-y	16	21	21

Quarter-finals
7	(India) P. V. Sindhu	13	21	12
2	(Chinese Taipei) Tai T-y	21	12	21

== Men's doubles ==
=== Seeds ===
1. (Indonesia) Marcus Fernaldi Gideon / Kevin Sanjaya Sukamuljo (withdrew)
2. (Japan) Takuro Hoki / Yugo Kobayashi (quarter-finals)
3. (Indonesia) Mohammad Ahsan / Hendra Setiawan (final)
4. (Chinese Taipei) Lee Yang / Wang Chi-lin (withdrew)
5. (Malaysia) Aaron Chia / Soh Wooi Yik (semi-finals)
6. (Indonesia) Fajar Alfian / Muhammad Rian Ardianto (champions)
7. (Denmark) Kim Astrup / Anders Skaarup Rasmussen (first round)
8. (Malaysia) Ong Yew Sin / Teo Ee Yi (withdrew)

=== Finals ===
Semi-finals
6	(Indonesia) Fajar Alfian (Indonesia) Muhammad Rian Ardianto	21	19	21
5	(Malaysia) Aaron Chia (Malaysia) Soh Wooi Yik	14	21	10
3	(Indonesia) Mohammad Ahsan (Indonesia) Hendra Setiawan	21	21
Q1	(China) Liang Weikeng (China) Wang Chang	19	14

Final
6	(Indonesia) Fajar Alfian (Indonesia) Muhammad Rian Ardianto	21	21
3	(Indonesia) Mohammad Ahsan (Indonesia) Hendra Setiawan	12	19

=== Top half ===
==== Section 1 ====
First round
PFQ	(Malaysia) N M Azriyn A (Malaysia) Lim K W	13	14
(Malaysia) Man W C (Malaysia) Tee K W	21	21
Q3	(Malaysia) Boon X Y (Malaysia) Wong T C	21	17	17
PFQ	(Malaysia) J Arif (Malaysia) M Haikal	15	21	21
6	(Indonesia) F Alfian (Indonesia) M R Ardianto	21	22
(Malaysia) Goh S F (Malaysia) N Izzuddin	14	20
(Japan) K Matsui (Japan) Y Takeuchi	21	17	20
(Thailand) S Jomkoh (Thailand) K Kedren	19	21	22

Second round
(Malaysia) Man W C (Malaysia) Tee K W	18	14
PFQ	(Malaysia) J Arif (Malaysia) M Haikal	21	21
6	(Indonesia) F Alfian (Indonesia) M R Ardianto	21	21
(Thailand) S Jomkoh (Thailand) K Kedren	14	14

Quarter-finals
PFQ	(Malaysia) J Arif (Malaysia) M Haikal	10	16
6	(Indonesia) F Alfian (Indonesia) M R Ardianto	21	21

==== Section 2 ====
First round
PFQ	(Malaysia) Chang Y J (Malaysia) Yap R K	21	22
(Republic of Ireland) J Magee (Republic of Ireland) P Reynolds	14	20
(China) He JT (China) Zhou HD	21	13	18
Q4	(Chinese Taipei) Chang K-c (Chinese Taipei) Po L-w	18	21	21
5	(Malaysia) A Chia (Malaysia) Soh W Y	21	21
(Japan) A Koga (Japan) T Saito	16	19
(South Korea) Kim G-j (South Korea) Kim S-r	14	21	21
(Chinese Taipei) Lee J-h (Chinese Taipei) Yang P-hs	21	15	19

Second round
PFQ	(Malaysia) Chang Y J (Malaysia) Yap R K	21	11	10
Q4	(Chinese Taipei) Chang K-c (Chinese Taipei) Po L-w	14	21	21
5	(Malaysia) A Chia (Malaysia) Soh W Y	21	21
(South Korea) Kim G-j (South Korea) Kim S-r	18	18

Quarter-finals
Q4	(Chinese Taipei) Chang K-c (Chinese Taipei) Po L-w	21	16
5	(Malaysia) A Chia (Malaysia) Soh W Y	23	21

=== Bottom half ===
==== Section 3 ====
First round
(Germany) M Lamsfuß (Germany) M Seidel	21	21
(South Korea) Kang M-h (South Korea) Seo S-j	17	18
(Chinese Taipei) Lu C-y (Chinese Taipei) Yang P-ha	21	21
PFQ	(Germany) J R Jansen (Germany) J C Völker	17	10
Q2	(Mauritius) J B Bongout (Mauritius) T Pultoo	3	7
(China) Ren XY (China) Tan Q	21	21
(Malaysia) Tan K M (Malaysia) Tan W K	18	13
3	(Indonesia) M Ahsan (Indonesia) H Setiawan	21	21

Second round
(Germany) M Lamsfuß (Germany) M Seidel	22	12	13
(Chinese Taipei) Lu C-y (Chinese Taipei) Yang P-ha	20	21	21
(China) Ren XY (China) Tan Q	14	21	15
3	(Indonesia) M Ahsan (Indonesia) H Setiawan	21	18	21

Quarter-finals
(Chinese Taipei) Lu C-y (Chinese Taipei) Yang P-ha	18	17
3	(Indonesia) M Ahsan (Indonesia) H Setiawan	21	21

==== Section 4 ====
First round
(Denmark) J Bay (Denmark) L Mølhede	23	21	10
Q1	(China) Liang WK (China) Wang C	25	19	21
(South Korea) Choi S-g (South Korea) Kim W-h	21	14	21
7	(Denmark) K Astrup (Denmark) A S Rasmussen	18	21	17
PFQ	(Malaysia) Goh V S (Malaysia) Low J S	15	21	21
(Indonesia) M S Fikri (Indonesia) B Maulana	21	14	19
(China) Liu YC (China) Ou XY	18	24	20
2	(Japan) T Hoki (Japan) Y Kobayashi	21	22	22

Second round
Q1	(China) Liang WK (China) Wang C	21	21
(South Korea) Choi S-g (South Korea) Kim W-h	9	17
PFQ	(Malaysia) Goh V S (Malaysia) Low J S
2	(Japan) T Hoki (Japan) Y Kobayashi	w	/	o

Quarter-finals
Q1	(China) Liang WK (China) Wang C	21	18	21
2	(Japan) T Hoki (Japan) Y Kobayashi	14	21	18

== Women's doubles ==
=== Seeds ===
1. (China) Chen Qingchen / Jia Yifan (champions)
2. (South Korea) Lee So-hee / Shin Seung-chan (quarter-finals)
3. (South Korea) Kim So-yeong / Kong Hee-yong (withdrew)
4. (Japan) Yuki Fukushima / Sayaka Hirota (second round)
5. (Japan) Mayu Matsumoto / Wakana Nagahara (second round)
6. (Japan) Nami Matsuyama / Chiharu Shida (final)
7. (Thailand) Jongkolphan Kititharakul / Rawinda Prajongjai (second round)
8. (Bulgaria) Gabriela Stoeva / Stefani Stoeva (second round)

=== Finals ===
Semi-finals
1	(China) Chen Qingchen (China) Jia Yifan	21	21
(Malaysia) Pearly Tan (Malaysia) Thinaah Muralitharan	10	19
(South Korea) Jeong Na-eun (South Korea) Kim Hye-jeong	22	13
6	(Japan) Nami Matsuyama (Japan) Chiharu Shida	24	21

Final
1	(China) Chen Qingchen (China) Jia Yifan	21	21
6	(Japan) Nami Matsuyama (Japan) Chiharu Shida	11	12

=== Top half ===
==== Section 1 ====
First round
1	(China) Chen QC (China) Jia YF	21	23
(Malaysia) V Hoo (Malaysia) Lim C S	17	21
(China) Liu XX (China) Xia YT	21	21
(India) S Gurazada (United States) I Jaiswal	10	10
7	(Thailand) J Kititharakul (Thailand) R Prajongjai	21	21
(Brazil) J Lima (Brazil) S Lima	15	5
(China) Zhang SX (China) Zheng Y	17	12
(China) Du Y (China) Li WM	21	21

Second round
1	(China) Chen QC (China) Jia YF	21	21
(China) Liu XX (China) Xia YT	11	16
7	(Thailand) J Kititharakul (Thailand) R Prajongjai	20	15
(China) Du Y (China) Li WM	22	21

Quarter-finals
1	(China) Chen QC (China) Jia YF	21	21
(China) Du Y (China) Li WM	15	13

==== Section 2 ====
First round
4	(Japan) Y Fukushima (Japan) S Hirota	21	21
(India) K. A Bhat (India) S Gautam	7	10
(India) T Jolly (India) G Gopichand	14	14
(Malaysia) P Tan (Malaysia) Thinaah M	21	21
8	(Bulgaria) G Stoeva (Bulgaria) S Stoeva	21	21
PFQ	(India) P Dandu (India) A S Sunil	17	17
Q2	(Thailand) S Paewsampran (Thailand) P Supajirakul	13	10
(Indonesia) A Rahayu (Indonesia) S F S Ramadhanti	21	21

Second round
4	(Japan) Y Fukushima (Japan) S Hirota	14	19
(Malaysia) P Tan (Malaysia) Thinaah M	21	21
8	(Bulgaria) G Stoeva (Bulgaria) S Stoeva	18	17
(Indonesia) A Rahayu (Indonesia) S F S Ramadhanti	21	21

Quarter-finals
(Malaysia) P Tan (Malaysia) Thinaah M	21	21
(Indonesia) A Rahayu (Indonesia) S F S Ramadhanti	18	17

=== Bottom half ===
==== Section 3 ====
First round
(Thailand) B Aimsaard (Thailand) N Aimsaard	19	17
(Malaysia) A Cheong (Malaysia) Teoh M X	21	21
Q1	(Thailand) P Phatcharaphisutsin (Thailand) N Sukklad	10	11
5	(Japan) M Matsumoto (Japan) W Nagahara	21	21
(South Korea) Jeong N-e (South Korea) Kim H-j	21	21
PFQ	(Republic of Ireland) K Frost (Republic of Ireland) M Ryan	7	9
(Indonesia) F V D Gani (Indonesia) R Sugiarto	21	21
PFQ	(Malaysia) Low Y Y (Malaysia) V Siow	12	17

Second round
(Malaysia) A Cheong (Malaysia) Teoh M X	21	21
5	(Japan) M Matsumoto (Japan) W Nagahara	11	15
(South Korea) Jeong N-e (South Korea) Kim H-j	23	21	21
(Indonesia) F V D Gani (Indonesia) R Sugiarto	25	17	18

Quarter-finals
(Malaysia) A Cheong (Malaysia) Teoh M X	14	18
(South Korea) Jeong N-e (South Korea) Kim H-j	21	21

==== Section 4 ====
First round
Q3	(Indonesia) F D Kusuma (Indonesia) A C Pratiwi	21	18	21
(India) A Ponnappa (India) N. S Reddy	19	21	16
(Germany) S Küspert (Germany) E Moszczynski	15	16
6	(Japan) N Matsuyama (Japan) C Shida	21	21
Q4	(Indonesia) M Mamahit (Indonesia) T Nadia	21	21
(Germany) L Efler (Germany) I Lohau	14	17
(Ukraine) M Stoliarenko (Ukraine) Y Zharka	12	16
2	(South Korea) Lee S-h (South Korea) Shin S-c	21	21

Second round
Q3	(Indonesia) F D Kusuma (Indonesia) A C Pratiwi	17	14
6	(Japan) N Matsuyama (Japan) C Shida	21	21
Q4	(Indonesia) M Mamahit (Indonesia) T Nadia	12	20
2	(South Korea) Lee S-h (South Korea) Shin S-c	21	22

Quarter-finals
6	(Japan) N Matsuyama (Japan) C Shida	21	21
2	(South Korea) Lee S-h (South Korea) Shin S-c	14	11

== Mixed doubles ==
=== Seeds ===
1. (Thailand) Dechapol Puavaranukroh / Sapsiree Taerattanachai (second round)
2. (China) Zheng Siwei / Huang Yaqiong (champions)
3. (Japan) Yuta Watanabe / Arisa Higashino (quarter-finals)
4. (China) Wang Yilyu / Huang Dongping (quarter-finals)
5. (Indonesia) Praveen Jordan / Melati Daeva Oktavianti (withdrew)
6. (Hong Kong) Tang Chun Man / Tse Ying Suet (first round)
7. (Malaysia) Tan Kian Meng / Lai Pei Jing (withdrew)
8. (Germany) Mark Lamsfuß / Isabel Lohau (first round)

=== Finals ===
Semi-finals
(Indonesia) Rinov Rivaldy (Indonesia) Pitha Haningtyas Mentari	18	21	21
(Thailand) Supak Jomkoh (Thailand) Supissara Paewsampran	21	10	15
(Chinese Taipei) Yang Po-hsuan (Chinese Taipei) Hu Ling-fang	22	16	20
2	(China) Zheng Siwei (China) Huang Yaqiong	20	21	22

Final
(Indonesia) Rinov Rivaldy (Indonesia) Pitha Haningtyas Mentari	17	12
2	(China) Zheng Siwei (China) Huang Yaqiong	21	21

=== Top half ===
==== Section 1 ====
First round
1	(Thailand) D Puavaranukroh (Thailand) S Taerattanachai	21	21
(Indonesia) R N Kusharjanto (Indonesia) L A Kusumawati	11	16
(Netherlands) R Tabeling (Netherlands) S Piek	21	21
(Chinese Taipei) Lee J-h (Chinese Taipei) Hsu Y-c	16	10
6	(Hong Kong) Tang C M (Hong Kong) Tse Y S	17	21	19
(Japan) Y Kaneko (Japan) M Matsutomo	21	19	21
(Indonesia) R Rivaldy (Indonesia) P H Mentari	21	21
Q1	(Denmark) M Thyrri (Denmark) A Magelund	16	14

Second round
1	(Thailand) D Puavaranukroh (Thailand) S Taerattanachai	21	15	13
(Netherlands) R Tabeling (Netherlands) S Piek	17	21	21
(Japan) Y Kaneko (Japan) M Matsutomo	15	18
(Indonesia) R Rivaldy (Indonesia) P H Mentari	21	21

Quarter-finals
(Netherlands) R Tabeling (Netherlands) S Piek	14	18
(Indonesia) R Rivaldy (Indonesia) P H Mentari	21	21

==== Section 2 ====
First round
3	(Japan) Y Watanabe (Japan) A Higashino	21	21	21
(China) Guo XW (China) Zhang SX	23	12	12
(Denmark) M Mikkelsen (Denmark) R Søby Hansen	17	21
(Denmark) M Christiansen (Denmark) A Bøje	21	23
8	(Germany) M Lamsfuß (Germany) I Lohau	17	11
(Malaysia) Chen T J (Malaysia) V Siow	21	21
Q4	(Indonesia) Z J Sumanti (Indonesia) H Julimarbela	18	16
(Thailand) S Jomkoh (Thailand) S Paewsampran	21	21

Second round
3	(Japan) Y Watanabe (Japan) A Higashino	21	18	21
(Denmark) M Christiansen (Denmark) A Bøje	19	21	15
(Malaysia) Chen T J (Malaysia) V Siow	10	12
(Thailand) S Jomkoh (Thailand) S Paewsampran	21	21

Quarter-finals
3	(Japan) Y Watanabe (Japan) A Higashino	21	21	18
(Thailand) S Jomkoh (Thailand) S Paewsampran	23	14	21

=== Bottom half ===
==== Section 3 ====
First round
(Chinese Taipei) Yang P-hs (Chinese Taipei) Hu L-f	w	/	o
(Japan) K Yamashita (Japan) N Shinoya
(Hong Kong) Chang T C (Hong Kong) Ng W Y	22	21
PFQ	(Egypt) A H Elgamal (Egypt) D Hany	20	15
Q2	(South Korea) Kim W-h (South Korea) Jeong N-e	25	8	7
PFQ	(Malaysia) Hoo P R (Malaysia) Toh E W	23	21	21
(South Korea) Ko S-h (South Korea) Eom H-w	12	17
4	(China) Wang YL (China) Huang DP	21	21

Second round
(Chinese Taipei) Yang P-hs (Chinese Taipei) Hu L-f	21	21
(Hong Kong) Chang T C (Hong Kong) Ng W Y	13	10
PFQ	(Malaysia) Hoo P R (Malaysia) Toh E W	16	16
4	(China) Wang YL (China) Huang DP	21	21

Quarter-finals
(Chinese Taipei) Yang P-hs (Chinese Taipei) Hu L-f	w	/	o
4	(China) Wang YL (China) Huang DP

==== Section 4 ====
First round
(Indonesia) H Faizal (Indonesia) S Kani	19	21	21
(Malaysia) Soong J V (Malaysia) Goh L Y	21	15	18
(Malaysia) Goh S H (Malaysia) S J Lai	21	22
PFQ	(Malaysia) Choong H J (Malaysia) Peck Y W	13	20
Q3	(Brazil) F Farias (Brazil) J Lima	12	15
(Malaysia) Chan P S (Malaysia) Cheah Y S	21	21
(Germany) J R Jansen (Germany) L Efler	14	12
2	(China) Zheng SW (China) Huang YQ	21	21

Second round
(Indonesia) H Faizal (Indonesia) S Kani	15	20
(Malaysia) Goh S H (Malaysia) S J Lai	21	22
(Malaysia) Chan P S (Malaysia) Cheah Y S	11	13
2	(China) Zheng SW (China) Huang YQ	21	21

Quarter-finals
(Malaysia) Goh S H (Malaysia) S J Lai	10	14
2	(China) Zheng SW (China) Huang YQ	21	21

Preceded by 2022 Malaysia Open	BWF World Tour; 2022 BWF season	Succeeded by 2022 Singapore Open
