= 2022 Singapore Open (badminton) =

2022 badminton tournament

Tournament details
- Dates: 12–17 July
- Edition: 71st
- Level: Super 500
- Total prize money: US$370,000
- Venue: Singapore Indoor Stadium
- Location: Kallang, Singapore

Champions
- Men's singles: (Indonesia) Anthony Sinisuka Ginting
- Women's singles: (India) P. V. Sindhu
- Men's doubles: (Indonesia) Leo Rolly Carnando (Indonesia) Daniel Marthin
- Women's doubles: (Indonesia) Apriyani Rahayu (Indonesia) Siti Fadia Silva Ramadhanti
- Mixed doubles: (Thailand) Dechapol Puavaranukroh (Thailand) Sapsiree Taerattanachai

The 2022 Singapore Open (officially known as the Singapore Badminton Open 2022) was a badminton tournament which took place at Singapore Indoor Stadium in Singapore from 12 to 17 July 2022 and had a total purse of $370,000.

== Tournament ==
The 2022 Singapore Open was the fourteenth tournament of the 2022 BWF World Tour and also part of the Singapore Open championships, which had been held since 1929. This tournament was organized by the Singapore Badminton Association with sanction from the BWF.

=== Venue ===
This international tournament was held at Singapore Indoor Stadium in Singapore.

=== Point distribution ===
Below is the point distribution table for each phase of the tournament based on the BWF points system for the BWF World Tour Super 500 event.

Winner	Runner-up	3/4	5/8	9/16	17/32	33/64	65/128
9,200	7,800	6,420	5,040	3,600	2,220	880	430

=== Prize pool ===
The total prize money was US$370,000 with the distribution of the prize money in accordance with BWF regulations.

Event	Winner	Finalist	Semi-finals	Quarter-finals	Last 16
Singles	$27,750	$14,060	$5,365	$2,220	$1,295
Doubles	$29,230	$14,060	$5,180	$2,682.5	$1,387.5

== Men's singles ==
=== Seeds ===
1. (Denmark) Viktor Axelsen (withdrew)
2. (Denmark) Anders Antonsen (withdrew)
3. (Chinese Taipei) Chou Tien-chen (second round)
4. (Indonesia) Anthony Sinisuka Ginting (champion)
5. (Indonesia) Jonatan Christie (second round)
6. (Singapore) Loh Kean Yew (semi-finals)
7. (India) Srikanth Kidambi (first round)
8. (Hong Kong) Ng Ka Long (first round)

=== Finals ===
Semi-finals
(China) Zhao Junpeng	18	23
(Japan) Kodai Naraoka	21	25
4	(Indonesia) Anthony Sinisuka Ginting	21	21
6	(Singapore) Loh Kean Yew	17	14

Final
(Japan) Kodai Naraoka	21	17
4	(Indonesia) Anthony Sinisuka Ginting	23	21

=== Top half ===
==== Section 1 ====
First round
PFQ	(Indonesia) C A Dwi Wardoyo	12	17
(Canada) B Yang	21	21
(China) Zhao JP	21	21
PFQ	(Thailand) K Phetpradab	8	9
7	(India) S Kidambi	17	21	18
Q4	(India) M Manjunath	21	15	21
PFQ	(Brazil) Y Coelho	12	22	16
(Republic of Ireland) N Nguyen	21	20	21

Second round
(Canada) B Yang	13	19
(China) Zhao JP	21	21
Q4	(India) M Manjunath	10	21	16
(Republic of Ireland) N Nguyen	21	18	21

Quarter-finals
(China) Zhao JP	21	23
(Republic of Ireland) N Nguyen	18	21

==== Section 2 ====
First round
3	(Chinese Taipei) Chou T-c	26	21
(China) Lu GZ	24	17
(Thailand) S Thammasin	13	16
(India) Prannoy H. S.	21	21
5	(Indonesia) J Christie	21	21
(India) Parupalli K	14	15
(Japan) K Naraoka	18	21	21
Q1	(China) Weng HY	21	19	15

Second round
3	(Chinese Taipei) Chou T-c	21	20	18
(India) Prannoy H. S.	14	22	21
5	(Indonesia) J Christie	21	18	15
(Japan) K Naraoka	7	21	21

Quarter-finals
(India) Prannoy H. S.	21	14	18
(Japan) K Naraoka	12	21	21

=== Bottom half ===
==== Section 3 ====
First round
(Hong Kong) Lee C Y	21	21
PFQ	(Israel) M Zilberman	15	19
PFQ	(Malaysia) Ng T Y	21	21
8	(Hong Kong) Ng K L	16	17
Q3	(Chinese Taipei) Lin C-y	12	21	21
(Thailand) K Wangcharoen	21	9	11
(Chinese Taipei) Wang T-w	19	16
4	(Indonesia) A S Ginting	21	21

Second round
(Hong Kong) Lee C Y	15	13
PFQ	(Malaysia) Ng T Y	21	21
Q3	(Chinese Taipei) Lin C-y	12	21	16
4	(Indonesia) A S Ginting	21	19	21

Quarter-finals
PFQ	(Malaysia) Ng T Y	15	12
4	(Indonesia) A S Ginting	21	21

==== Section 4 ====
First round
(Indonesia) T Sugiarto	21	21
Q2	(Singapore) J Teh	12	15
(France) B Leverdez	10	11
6	(Singapore) Loh K Y	21	21
(China) Li SF	21	21
(India) Sa Verma	10	13
(Denmark) H-K Vittinghus	21	22	9
PFQ	(Japan) K Watanabe	17	24	21

Second round
(Indonesia) T Sugiarto	13	17
6	(Singapore) Loh K Y	21	21
(China) Li SF	21	21
PFQ	(Japan) K Watanabe	18	17

Quarter-finals
6	(Singapore) Loh K Y	21	21
(China) Li SF	15	18

== Women's singles ==
=== Seeds ===
1. (Chinese Taipei) Tai Tzu-ying (second round)
2. (China) Chen Yufei (withdrew)
3. (India) P. V. Sindhu (champion)
4. (Thailand) Ratchanok Intanon (first round)
5. (China) He Bingjiao (second round)
6. (Thailand) Pornpawee Chochuwong (quarter-finals)
7. (Thailand) Busanan Ongbamrungphan (first round)
8. (Canada) Michelle Li (withdrew)

=== Finals ===
Semi-finals
(Japan) Saena Kawakami	15	7
3	(India) P. V. Sindhu	21	21
(Japan) Aya Ohori	14	14
(China) Wang Zhiyi	21	21

Final
3	(India) P. V. Sindhu	21	11	21
(China) Wang Zhiyi	9	21	15

=== Top half ===
==== Section 1 ====
First round
1	(Chinese Taipei) Tai T-y	21	21
(Chinese Taipei) Pai Y-p	17	16
(Japan) S Kawakami	21	21
PFQ	(Canada) WY Zhang	12	17
6	(Thailand) P Chochuwong	21	21
(United States) BW Zhang	18	13
(Singapore) Yeo J M	21	21
Q2	(Poland) J Hart	12	9

Second round
1	(Chinese Taipei) Tai T-y
(Japan) S Kawakami	w	/	o
6	(Thailand) P Chochuwong	16	21	21
(Singapore) Yeo J M	21	15	11

Quarter-finals
(Japan) S Kawakami	21	21
6	(Thailand) P Chochuwong	17	19

==== Section 2 ====
First round
3	(India) P. V. Sindhu	21	21
(Belgium) L Tan	15	11
(United States) I Wang	17	21	15
PFQ	(Vietnam) Nguyễn T L	21	14	21
7	(Thailand) B Ongbamrungphan	16	11
PFQ	(India) A Chaliha	21	21
(China) Han Y	21	21
(Indonesia) P K Wardani	14	16

Second round
3	(India) P. V. Sindhu	19	21	21
PFQ	(Vietnam) Nguyễn T L	21	19	18
PFQ	(India) A Chaliha	9	13
(China) Han Y	21	21

Quarter-finals
3	(India) P. V. Sindhu	17	21	21
(China) Han Y	21	11	19

=== Bottom half ===
==== Section 3 ====
First round
(India) S Nehwal	21	21
(India) M Bansod	18	14
(Thailand) P Chaiwan	9	21
5	(China) He BJ	21	23
PFQ	(Myanmar) Thet Htar T	10	12
(Japan) A Ohori	21	21
Q3	(Chinese Taipei) Sung S-y	9
4	(Thailand) R Intanon	11^{r}

Second round
(India) S Nehwal	21	11	21
5	(China) He BJ	19	21	17
(Japan) A Ohori	20	21	21
Q3	(Chinese Taipei) Sung S-y	22	18	4

Quarter-finals
(India) S Nehwal	13	21	20
(Japan) A Ohori	21	15	22

==== Section 4 ====
First round
(China) Zhang YM	21	21
Q4	(Singapore) G Chua	11	13
(Indonesia) G M Tunjung	21	21
PFQ	(United States) L Lam	16	13
(Chinese Taipei) Hsu W-c	16	18
(China) Wang ZY	21	21
Q1	(Switzerland) J Stadelmann	21	19	17
PFQ	(Japan) N Nidaira	18	21	21

Second round
(China) Zhang YM	22	14	15
(Indonesia) G M Tunjung	20	21	21
(China) Wang ZY	22	21
PFQ	(Japan) N Nidaira	20	17

Quarter-finals
(Indonesia) G M Tunjung	17	18
(China) Wang ZY	21	21

== Men's doubles ==
=== Seeds ===
1. (Indonesia) Marcus Fernaldi Gideon / Kevin Sanjaya Sukamuljo (withdrew)
2. (Indonesia) Mohammad Ahsan / Hendra Setiawan (semi-finals)
3. (Chinese Taipei) Lee Yang / Wang Chi-lin (second round)
4. (Indonesia) Fajar Alfian / Muhammad Rian Ardianto (final)
5. (Malaysia) Ong Yew Sin / Teo Ee Yi (second round)
6. (Malaysia) Goh Sze Fei / Nur Izzuddin (second round)
7. (Germany) Mark Lamsfuß / Marvin Seidel (first round)
8. (Indonesia) Pramudya Kusumawardana / Yeremia Rambitan (withdrew)

=== Finals ===
Semi-finals
(Indonesia) Sabar Karyaman Gutama (Indonesia) Muhammad Reza Pahlevi Isfahani	11	7
4	(Indonesia) Fajar Alfian (Indonesia) Muhammad Rian Ardianto	21	21
(Indonesia) Leo Rolly Carnando (Indonesia) Daniel Marthin	9	21	22
2	(Indonesia) Mohammad Ahsan (Indonesia) Hendra Setiawan	21	18	20

Final
4	(Indonesia) Fajar Alfian (Indonesia) Muhammad Rian Ardianto	21	14	16
(Indonesia) Leo Rolly Carnando (Indonesia) Daniel Marthin	9	21	21

=== Top half ===
==== Section 1 ====
First round
PFQ	(Malaysia) Goh V S (Malaysia) Low J S	21	21
PFQ	(India) S Prasad (India) S. Sunjith Jr.	12	10
(Indonesia) S K Gutama (Indonesia) M R P Isfahani	21	21
Q4	(Singapore) A Kwek (Singapore) J Wong	15	18
5	(Malaysia) Ong Y S (Malaysia) Teo E Y	21	21
(Thailand) S Jomkoh (Thailand) K Kedren	14	14
(Chinese Taipei) Lu C-y (Chinese Taipei) Yang P-ha	21	21
(Republic of Ireland) J Magee (Republic of Ireland) P Reynolds	14	10

Second round
PFQ	(Malaysia) Goh V S (Malaysia) Low J S	11	18
(Indonesia) S K Gutama (Indonesia) M R P Isfahani	21	21
5	(Malaysia) Ong Y S (Malaysia) Teo E Y	18	19
(Chinese Taipei) Lu C-y (Chinese Taipei) Yang P-ha	21	21

Quarter-finals
(Indonesia) S K Gutama (Indonesia) M R P Isfahani	21	21
(Chinese Taipei) Lu C-y (Chinese Taipei) Yang P-ha	16	17

==== Section 2 ====
First round
4	(Indonesia) F Alfian (Indonesia) M R Ardianto	21	21
(China) Liu YC (China) Ou XY	18	15
(China) Ren XY (China) Tan Q	21	25
PFQ	(India) P.S Ravikrishna (India) S P Udayakumar	17	23
PFQ	(Malaysia) J Arif (Malaysia) M Haikal	16	21	21
Q3	(Singapore) W Koh (Singapore) J Kubo	21	19	15
(India) K P Garaga (India) V G Panjala	15	21	17
(Singapore) T Hee (Singapore) Loh K H	21	19	21

Second round
4	(Indonesia) F Alfian (Indonesia) M R Ardianto	21	15	21
(China) Ren XY (China) Tan Q	12	21	13
PFQ	(Malaysia) J Arif (Malaysia) M Haikal	9	17
(Singapore) T Hee (Singapore) Loh K H	21	21

Quarter-finals
4	(Indonesia) F Alfian (Indonesia) M R Ardianto	16	21	21
(Singapore) T Hee (Singapore) Loh K H	21	15	15

=== Bottom half ===
==== Section 3 ====
First round
(Malaysia) Tan K M (Malaysia) Tan W K	18	14
(Indonesia) L R Carnando (Indonesia) D Marthin	21	21
Q2	(China) Liang WK (China) Wang C	14	21	21
7	(Germany) M Lamsfuß (Germany) M Seidel	21	15	14
(Malaysia) N M Azriyn A (Malaysia) Lim K W	9	10
(China) He JT (China) Zhou HD	21	21
(Norway) T Flåtten (Norway) V Rikheim	10	14
3	(Chinese Taipei) Lee Y (Chinese Taipei) Wang C-l	21	21

Second round
(Indonesia) L R Carnando (Indonesia) D Marthin	21	21
Q2	(China) Liang WK (China) Wang C	18	12
(China) He JT (China) Zhou HD	21	21	21
3	(Chinese Taipei) Lee Y (Chinese Taipei) Wang C-l	18	23	14

Quarter-finals
(Indonesia) L R Carnando (Indonesia) D Marthin	21	17	21
(China) He JT (China) Zhou HD	14	21	11

==== Section 4 ====
First round
(Germany) J R Jansen (Germany) J C Völker	19	9
(India) Arjun M. R. (India) D Kapila	21	21
(Japan) H Okamura (Japan) M Onodera	19	6
6	(Malaysia) Goh S F (Malaysia) N Izzuddin	21	21
Q1	(Malaysia) Chia W J (Malaysia) Low H Y	15	12
(Malaysia) Man W C (Malaysia) Tee K W	21	21
(Indonesia) M S Fikri (Indonesia) B Maulana	17	15
2	(Indonesia) M Ahsan (Indonesia) H Setiawan	21	21

Second round
(India) Arjun M. R. (India) D Kapila	18	24	21
6	(Malaysia) Goh S F (Malaysia) N Izzuddin	21	22	18
(Malaysia) Man W C (Malaysia) Tee K W	14	15
2	(Indonesia) M Ahsan (Indonesia) H Setiawan	21	21

Quarter-finals
(India) Arjun M. R. (India) D Kapila	21	18	17
2	(Indonesia) M Ahsan (Indonesia) H Setiawan	10	21	21

== Women's doubles ==
=== Seeds ===
1. (China) Chen Qingchen / Jia Yifan (withdrew)
2. (Thailand) Jongkolphan Kititharakul / Rawinda Prajongjai (quarter-finals)
3. (Bulgaria) Gabriela Stoeva / Stefani Stoeva (first round)
4. (China) Liu Xuanxuan / Xia Yuting (quarter-finals)
5. (China) Zhang Shuxian / Zheng Yu (final)
6. (China) Du Yue / Li Wenmei (semi-finals)
7. (Germany) Linda Efler / Isabel Lohau (second round)
8. (Thailand) Benyapa Aimsaard / Nuntakarn Aimsaard (second round)

=== Finals ===
Semi-finals
(Indonesia) Apriyani Rahayu (Indonesia) Siti Fadia Silva Ramadhanti	19	21	21
(Thailand) Supissara Paewsampran (Thailand) Puttita Supajirakul	21	13	19
5	(China) Zhang Shuxian (China) Zheng Yu	21	21
6	(China) Du Yue (China) Li Wenmei	18	18

Final
(Indonesia) Apriyani Rahayu (Indonesia) Siti Fadia Silva Ramadhanti	21	21
5	(China) Zhang Shuxian (China) Zheng Yu	14	17

=== Top half ===
==== Section 1 ====
First round
PFQ	(India) M M Bora (India) L L Rachapalli	8	2
(Japan) S Hobara (Japan) H Suzuki	21	21
Q4	(Thailand) K Dubthuk (Thailand) P Pattanawaritthipan	18	16
(Malaysia) V Hoo (Malaysia) Lim C S	21	21
7	(Germany) L Efler (Germany) I Lohau	22	21
(United States) F Corbett (United States) A Lee	20	12
(Singapore) Jin YJ (Singapore) C Wong	9	8
(Indonesia) A Rahayu (Indonesia) S F S Ramadhanti	21	21

Second round
(Japan) S Hobara (Japan) H Suzuki	21	21
(Malaysia) V Hoo (Malaysia) Lim C S	18	11
7	(Germany) L Efler (Germany) I Lohau	13	11
(Indonesia) A Rahayu (Indonesia) S F S Ramadhanti	21	21

Quarter-finals
(Japan) S Hobara (Japan) H Suzuki	14	12
(Indonesia) A Rahayu (Indonesia) S F S Ramadhanti	21	21

==== Section 2 ====
First round
4	(China) Liu XX (China) Xia YT	20	21	21
PFQ	(Chinese Taipei) Hsu Y-c (Chinese Taipei) Lin W-c	22	18	9
Q3
(Ukraine) M Stoliarenko (Ukraine) Y Zharka	w	/	o
8	(Thailand) B Aimsaard (Thailand) N Aimsaard	21	21
(India) S Gurazada (United States) I Jaiswal	11	9
(Thailand) S Paewsampran (Thailand) P Supajirakul	22	21
(Republic of Ireland) K Frost (Republic of Ireland) M Ryan	20	15

Second round
4	(China) Liu XX (China) Xia YT	21	21
(Ukraine) M Stoliarenko (Ukraine) Y Zharka	13	13
8	(Thailand) B Aimsaard (Thailand) N Aimsaard	21	18	16
(Thailand) S Paewsampran (Thailand) P Supajirakul	18	21	21

Quarter-finals
4	(China) Liu XX (China) Xia YT	15	12
(Thailand) S Paewsampran (Thailand) P Supajirakul	21	21

=== Bottom half ===
==== Section 3 ====
First round
Q1
PFQ	(United States) A Xu (United States) K Xu	w	/	o
PFQ	(Indonesia) L T Mayasari (Indonesia) J P Miantoro	11	13
5	(China) Zhang SX (China) Zheng Y	21	21
(Indonesia) F D Kusuma (Indonesia) A C Pratiwi	21	12	21
(Indonesia) M Mamahit (Indonesia) T Nadia	17	21	19
PFQ	(Thailand) P Phatcharaphisutsin (Thailand) N Sukklad	21	17	21
3	(Bulgaria) G Stoeva (Bulgaria) S Stoeva	13	21	18

Second round
PFQ	(United States) A Xu (United States) K Xu	13	7
5	(China) Zhang SX (China) Zheng Y	21	21
(Indonesia) F D Kusuma (Indonesia) A C Pratiwi	21	21
PFQ	(Thailand) P Phatcharaphisutsin (Thailand) N Sukklad	13	9

Quarter-finals
5	(China) Zhang SX (China) Zheng Y	21	18	21
(Indonesia) F D Kusuma (Indonesia) A C Pratiwi	16	21	11

==== Section 4 ====
First round
Q2	(Chinese Taipei) Hu L-f (Chinese Taipei) Lin X-m
(India) P Dandu (India) A S Sunil	w	/	o
(Indonesia) M T Puspita Sari (Indonesia) R A Rose	14	18
6	(China) Du Y (China) Li WM	21	21
PFQ	(Japan) R Hirokami (Japan) Y Kato	21	21
(Hong Kong) Ng T Y (Hong Kong) Tsang H Y	12	13
(India) S Singhi (India) R Thaker	7	18
2	(Thailand) J Kititharakul (Thailand) R Prajongjai	21	21

Second round
(India) P Dandu (India) A S Sunil	12	6
6	(China) Du Y (China) Li WM	21	21
PFQ	(Japan) R Hirokami (Japan) Y Kato	15	19
2	(Thailand) J Kititharakul (Thailand) R Prajongjai	21	21

Quarter-finals
6	(China) Du Y (China) Li WM	22	21
2	(Thailand) J Kititharakul (Thailand) R Prajongjai	20	17

== Mixed doubles ==
=== Seeds ===
1. (Thailand) Dechapol Puavaranukroh / Sapsiree Taerattanachai (champions)
2. (China) Zheng Siwei / Huang Yaqiong (withdrew)
3. (China) Wang Yilyu / Huang Dongping (final)
4. (Hong Kong) Tang Chun Man / Tse Ying Suet (quarter-finals)
5. (Malaysia) Tan Kian Meng / Lai Pei Jing (withdrew)
6. (Germany) Mark Lamsfuß / Isabel Lohau (quarter-finals)
7. (Malaysia) Goh Soon Huat / Shevon Jemie Lai (semi-finals)
8. (Denmark) Mathias Christiansen / Alexandra Bøje (second round)

=== Finals ===
Semi-finals
1	(Thailand) Dechapol Puavaranukroh (Thailand) Sapsiree Taerattanachai	21	16	22
7	(Malaysia) Goh Soon Huat (Malaysia) Shevon Jemie Lai	17	21	20
3	(China) Wang Yilyu (China) Huang Dongping	21	21
(China) Guo Xinwa (China) Zhang Shuxian	8	9

Final
1	(Thailand) Dechapol Puavaranukroh (Thailand) Sapsiree Taerattanachai	21	21
3	(China) Wang Yilyu (China) Huang Dongping	12	17

=== Top half ===
==== Section 1 ====
First round
1	(Thailand) D Puavaranukroh (Thailand) S Taerattanachai	21	21
(Malaysia) Choong H J (Malaysia) Peck Y W	16	12
(Thailand) S Jomkoh (Thailand) S Paewsampran	22	21	21
PFQ	(Indonesia) Z J Sumanti (Indonesia) H Julimarbela	24	15	18
PFQ	(Hong Kong) Lee C H (Hong Kong) Ng T Y	11	21	21
PFQ	(China) Feng YZ (China) Lin FL	21	13	14
(Malaysia) Chen T J (Malaysia) V Siow	21	21
(New Zealand) O Leydon-Davis (New Zealand) A Pak	14	14

Second round
1	(Thailand) D Puavaranukroh (Thailand) S Taerattanachai	22	21
(Thailand) S Jomkoh (Thailand) S Paewsampran	20	16
PFQ	(Hong Kong) Lee C H (Hong Kong) Ng T Y	13	7
(Malaysia) Chen T J (Malaysia) V Siow	21	21

Quarter-finals
1	(Thailand) D Puavaranukroh (Thailand) S Taerattanachai	21	22
(Malaysia) Chen T J (Malaysia) V Siow	10	20

==== Section 2 ====
First round
4	(Hong Kong) Tang C M (Hong Kong) Tse Y S	21	21
(Egypt) A H Elgamal (Egypt) D Hany	13	12
(Indonesia) H Faizal (Indonesia) S Kani	21	14	21
(Indonesia) R N Kusharjanto (Indonesia) L A Kusumawati	10	21	19
7	(Malaysia) Goh S H (Malaysia) S J Lai	w	/	o
(Chinese Taipei) Yang P-hs (Chinese Taipei) Hu L-f
Q1	(Malaysia) Wong T C (Malaysia) Lim C S	14	16
(Indonesia) R Rivaldy (Indonesia) P H Mentari	21	21

Second round
4	(Hong Kong) Tang C M (Hong Kong) Tse Y S	21	21
(Indonesia) H Faizal (Indonesia) S Kani	16	10
7	(Malaysia) Goh S H (Malaysia) S J Lai	10	21	21
(Indonesia) R Rivaldy (Indonesia) P H Mentari	21	18	10

Quarter-finals
4	(Hong Kong) Tang C M (Hong Kong) Tse Y S	20	21	18
7	(Malaysia) Goh S H (Malaysia) S J Lai	22	16	21

=== Bottom half ===
==== Section 3 ====
First round
(India) Nithin H. V. (India) P S. Ram	21	21
PFQ	(Israel) M Zilberman (Israel) S Zilberman	14	15
Q3	(Germany) J C Völker (Germany) S Küspert	14	9
6	(Germany) M Lamsfuß (Germany) I Lohau	21	21
(Malaysia) Soong J V (Malaysia) Goh L Y	14	18
(Malaysia) Chan P S (Malaysia) Cheah Y S	21	21
Q2
3	(China) Wang YL (China) Huang DP	w	/	o

Second round
(India) Nithin H. V. (India) P S. Ram	14	13
6	(Germany) M Lamsfuß (Germany) I Lohau	21	21
(Malaysia) Chan P S (Malaysia) Cheah Y S	19	14
3	(China) Wang YL (China) Huang DP	21	21

Quarter-finals
6	(Germany) M Lamsfuß (Germany) I Lohau	12	21	17
3	(China) Wang YL (China) Huang DP	21	19	21

==== Section 4 ====
First round
(Germany) J R Jansen (Germany) L Efler	21	16
(Malaysia) Hoo P R (Malaysia) Toh E W	23	21
(Singapore) T Hee (Singapore) Tan W H	18	14
8	(Denmark) M Christiansen (Denmark) A Bøje	21	21
Q4	(Singapore) W Koh (Singapore) C Wong	21	16	13
(China) Guo XW (China) Zhang SX	14	21	21
(Japan) H Midorikawa (Japan) N Saito	21	14	17
PFQ	(Japan) Y Nishikawa (Japan) S Ozaki	14	21	21

Second round
(Malaysia) Hoo P R (Malaysia) Toh E W	21	21
8	(Denmark) M Christiansen (Denmark) A Bøje	11	19
(China) Guo XW (China) Zhang SX	22	21
PFQ	(Japan) Y Nishikawa (Japan) S Ozaki	20	15

Quarter-finals
(Malaysia) Hoo P R (Malaysia) Toh E W	16	14
(China) Guo XW (China) Zhang SX	21	21

Preceded by 2022 Malaysia Masters	BWF World Tour; 2022 BWF season	Succeeded by 2022 Taipei Open
