= 2022 BWF World Tour Finals =

2022 badminton tournament in Thailand

Tournament details
- Dates: 7–11 December
- Edition: 5th
- Level: World Tour Finals
- Total prize money: US$1,500,000
- Venue: Nimibutr Arena
- Location: Bangkok, Thailand

Champions
- Men's singles: (Denmark) Viktor Axelsen
- Women's singles: (Japan) Akane Yamaguchi
- Men's doubles: (China) Liu Yuchen (China) Ou Xuanyi
- Women's doubles: (China) Chen Qingchen (China) Jia Yifan
- Mixed doubles: (China) Zheng Siwei (China) Huang Yaqiong

The 2022 BWF World Tour Finals (officially known as the HSBC BWF World Tour Finals 2022 for sponsorship reasons) was the final tournament of the 2022 BWF World Tour. It was scheduled to be held from 14 to 18 December 2022 in Guangzhou, China but was later moved to Bangkok, Thailand, and held a week earlier – from 7 to 11 December 2022 – due to the COVID-19 pandemic in China. It had a total prize of $1,500,000.

== Tournament ==
The 2022 BWF World Tour was the fifth edition of the BWF World Tour Finals and was originally scheduled to be organized by the Guangzhou Sports Bureau, Guangzhou Sports Competitions Centre, Guangzhou Badminton Administrative Centre, and Guangzhou Badminton Association. It would have been hosted by the Chinese Badminton Association and Guangzhou Municipal Government with sanction from the BWF.

Due to the uncertainties caused by the COVID-19 pandemic in China, the tournament was relocated to Thailand. It was then hosted by the Badminton Association of Thailand.

=== Venue ===
This international tournament was originally planned to be held at the Tianhe Gymnasium in Tianhe, Guangzhou, China. It was later relocated to Nimibutr Arena in Bangkok, Thailand, due to the circumstances in regard of the COVID-19 pandemic in China.

=== Point distribution ===
Below is the point distribution table for each phase of the tournament based on the BWF points system for the BWF World Tour Finals event.

Winner(s)	Runner(s)-up	Semi-finalists	3rd in group	4th in group
12,000	10,200	8,400	7,500	6,600

=== Prize money ===
The total prize money for this year's tournament was US$1,500,000. Distribution of prize money was in accordance with BWF regulations.

Achievement	Winner(s)	Runner(s)-up	Semi-finalist(s)	3rd in group	4th in group
Singles	$120,000	$60,000	$30,000	$16,500	$9,000
Doubles	$126,000	$60,000	$30,000	$19,500	$10,500

== Tie-breaking criteria ==
Players or pairs was ranked according to points (1 point for a win, 0 points for a loss). If two players/pairs were tied on points, the result of head-to-head match among the tied players/pairs was used to determine the rankings. If more than two players/pairs were tied, and after applying the head-to-head criteria above, a subset of players/pairs were still tied, the criteria above was reapplied exclusively to this subset of players/pairs;

1. Game difference in all group matches; if two players/pairs still tied, then reapply the head-to-head criteria above;
2. Point difference in all group matches; if two players/pairs still tied, then reapply the head-to-head criteria above;
3. Drawing of lots if three or more players/pairs still tied.

== Representatives ==
=== Eligible players ===
Below are the eligible players for World Tour Finals.

Men's singles

Seeds	Rank	NOCs	Players	Performances		
Seeds	Rank	NOCs	Players	Winner(s)	Runner(s)-up	Semi-finalists
1	1	Denmark (1)	Viktor Axelsen	5 Super 1000: All England Open, Indonesia Open; Super 750: Malaysia Open, French Open; Super 500: Indonesia Masters		1 Super 300: German Open
2	2	Chinese Taipei (1)	Chou Tien-chen	1 Super 300: Taipei Open	3 Super 750: Japan Open; Super 500: Indonesia Masters; Super 300: Hylo Open	1 Super 1000: All England Open
3	3	India (1)	Prannoy H. S.		1 Super 300: Swiss Open	2 Super 1000: Indonesia Open; Super 500: Malaysia Masters
4	4	Indonesia (1)	Jonatan Christie	1 Super 300: Swiss Open	1 Super 500: Korea Open	1 Super 750: Malaysia Open
	5	Japan (1)	Kodai Naraoka	1 Super 100: Vietnam Open	3 Super 500: Singapore Open; Super 300: Korea Masters, Taipei Open	4 Super 750: Denmark Open, French Open; Super 500: Thailand Open; Super 300: Australian Open
	6	China (1)	Lu Guangzu		1 Super 300: Australian Open	1 Super 500: Malaysia Masters
	7	Indonesia (2)	Anthony Sinisuka Ginting	2 Super 500: Singapore Open; Super 300: Hylo Open		2 Super 500: Indonesia Masters; Super 300: Swiss Open
	8	Singapore (1)	Loh Kean Yew		1 Super 500: India Open	3 Super 750: Denmark Open; Super 500: Indonesia Masters, Singapore Open

Women's singles

Seeds	Rank	NOCs	Players	Performances		
Seeds	Rank	NOCs	Players	Winner(s)	Runner(s)-up	Semi-finalists
1	1	China (1)	Chen Yufei	1 Super 500: Indonesia Masters	6 Super 750: Malaysia Open, Denmark Open; Super 500: Thailand Open, Malaysia Masters; Super 300: German Open, Korea Masters	3 Super 1000: All England Open, Indonesia Open; Super 750: Japan Open
2	2	Chinese Taipei (1)	Tai Tzu-ying	3 Super 1000: Indonesia Open; Super 500: Thailand Open; Super 300: Taipei Open		5 Super 1000: All England Open; Super 750: Malaysia Open, Japan Open, French Open; Super 500: Malaysia Masters
3	3	China (2)	He Bingjiao	4 Super 750: Denmark Open, French Open; Super 300: German Open, Korea Masters		2 Super 1000: Indonesia Open; Super 500: Indonesia Masters
4	4	South Korea (1)	An Se-young	3 Super 500: Korea Open, Malaysia Masters; Super 300: Australian Open	2 Super 1000: All England Open; Super 750: Japan Open	2 Super 300: German Open, Korea Masters
	7	Thailand (1)	Ratchanok Intanon	1 Super 750: Malaysia Open	1 Super 500: Indonesia Masters	2 Super 750: Denmark Open; Super 500: Thailand Open
	8	Thailand (2)	Busanan Ongbamrungphan	1 Super 500: India Open	1 Super 300: Swiss Open	
	10	Japan (1)	Akane Yamaguchi	2 Super 1000: All England Open; Super 750: Japan Open		1 Super 750: French Open
	13	Indonesia (1)	Gregoria Mariska Tunjung		1 Super 300: Australian Open	2 Super 500: Malaysia Masters; Super 300: Hylo Open

Men's doubles

Seeds	Rank	NOCs	Players	Performances		
Seeds	Rank	NOCs	Players	Winner(s)	Runner(s)-up	Semi-finalists
1	1	Indonesia (1)	Fajar Alfian; Muhammad Rian Ardianto	4 Super 750: Denmark Open; Super 500: Indonesia Masters, Malaysia Masters; Super 300: Swiss Open	4 Super 750: Malaysia Open; Super 500: Korea Open, Thailand Open, Singapore Open	
2	2	Indonesia (2)	Mohammad Ahsan; Hendra Setiawan		3 Super 1000: All England Open; Super 500: India Open, Malaysia Masters	4 Super 750: Malaysia Open, Denmark Open; Super 500: Korea Open, Singapore Open
3	3	Malaysia (1)	Ong Yew Sin; Teo Ee Yi		1 Super 300: Australian Open	2 Super 750: Denmark Open; Super 500: India Open
4	4	China (1)	Liu Yuchen; Ou Xuanyi	2 Super 1000: Indonesia Open; Super 300: Australian Open	2 Super 300: German Open, Korea Masters	
	6	Denmark (1)	Kim Astrup; Anders Skaarup Rasmussen		1 Super 750: Japan Open	4 Super 1000: Indonesia Open; Super 500: Thailand Open; Super 300: German Open, Hylo Open
	7	Japan (1)	Takuro Hoki; Yugo Kobayashi	2 Super 750: Malaysia Open; Super 500: Thailand Open		
	8	South Korea (1)	Choi Sol-gyu; Kim Won-ho		1 Super 1000: Indonesia Open	3 Super 750: Japan Open, French Open; Super 300: Korea Masters
	9	Malaysia (2)	Aaron Chia; Soh Wooi Yik			6 Super 1000: Indonesia Open; Super 750: Malaysia Open, Denmark Open; Super 500: Thailand Open, Malaysia Masters; Super 300: Swiss Open

Women's doubles

Seeds	Rank	NOCs	Players	Performances		
Seeds	Rank	NOCs	Players	Winner(s)	Runner(s)-up	Semi-finalists
1	1	South Korea (1)	Jeong Na-eun; Kim Hye-jeong	2 Super 750: Japan Open; Super 500: Korea Open		5 Super 1000: All England Open; Super 750: Malaysia Open; Super 500: Indonesia Masters, Malaysia Masters; Super 300: Australian Open
2	2	China (2)	Zhang Shuxian; Zheng Yu	1 Super 300: Australian Open	3 Super 1000: All England Open; Super 750: Malaysia Open; Super 500: Singapore Open	3 Super 500: Thailand Open; Super 300: German Open, Hylo Open
3	3	Thailand (1)	Benyapa Aimsaard; Nuntakarn Aimsaard	3 Super 500: India Open; Super 300: Hylo Open; Super 100: Vietnam Open	2 Super 500: Korea Open; Super 300: Australian Open	
4	4	China (1)	Chen Qingchen; Jia Yifan	4 Super 750: Denmark Open; Super 500: Indonesia Masters, Malaysia Masters; Super 300: German Open		1 Super 750: Japan Open
	6	Thailand (2)	Jongkolphan Kititharakul; Rawinda Prajongjai		1 Super 300: Hylo Open	4 Super 1000: Indonesia Open; Super 750: Denmark Open; Super 300: German Open, Swiss Open
	7	Malaysia (1)	Vivian Hoo; Lim Chiew Sien			1 Super 300: Swiss Open
	8	Malaysia (2)	Pearly Tan; Thinaah Muralitharan	1 Super 750: French Open		3 Super 500: Thailand Open, Indonesia Masters, Malaysia Masters
	9	Indonesia (1)	Apriyani Rahayu; Siti Fadia Silva Ramadhanti	2 Super 750: Malaysia Open; Super 500: Singapore Open	1 Super 500: Indonesia Masters	

Mixed doubles

Seeds	Rank	NOCs	Players	Performances		
Seeds	Rank	NOCs	Players	Winner(s)	Runner(s)-up	Semi-finalists
1	1	China (1)	Zheng Siwei; Huang Yaqiong	7 Super 1000: Indonesia Open; Super 750: Malaysia Open, Denmark Open, French Open; Super 500: Thailand Open, Indonesia Masters, Malaysia Masters		2 Super 1000: All England Open; Super 750: Japan Open
2	2	Thailand (1)	Dechapol Puavaranukroh; Sapsiree Taerattanachai	3 Super 750: Japan Open; Super 500: Singapore Open; Super 300: German Open	2 Super 750: Malaysia Open; Super 500: Thailand Open	1 Super 1000: All England Open
3	3	China (2)	Wang Yilyu; Huang Dongping	1 Super 300: Korea Masters	2 Super 1000: All England Open; Super 500: Singapore Open	4 Super 1000: Indonesia Open; Super 750: Malaysia Open, Japan Open; Super 500: Thailand Open
4	4	Malaysia (1)	Goh Soon Huat; Shevon Jemie Lai		1 Super 300: Swiss Open	3 Super 750: Denmark Open; Super 500: Singapore Open; Super 300: Korea Masters
	5	Malaysia (2)	Tan Kian Meng; Lai Pei Jing	1 Super 500: Korea Open		2 Super 500: India Open; Super 300: Swiss Open
	6	Indonesia (1)	Rinov Rivaldy; Pitha Haningtyas Mentari		1 Super 500: Malaysia Masters	1 Super 500: Korea Open
	7	France (1)	Thom Gicquel; Delphine Delrue		1 Super 500: Indonesia Masters	1 Super 300: Hylo Open
	9	Thailand (2)	Supak Jomkoh; Supissara Paewsampran			3 Super 750: Denmark Open; Super 500: Indonesia Masters, Malaysia Masters

=== Representatives by nation ===
Rank	Nation	MS	WS	MD	WD	XD	Total	Players
1	China	1	2	1	2	2	8	13
2	Indonesia	2	1	2	1	1	7	11
3	Malaysia			2	2	2	6	12
4	Thailand (H)		2		2	2	6	10
5	South Korea		1	1	1		3	5
6	Japan	1	1	1			3	4
7	Denmark	1		1			2	3
8	Chinese Taipei	1	1				2	2
9	France					1	1	2
10	India	1					1	1
10	Singapore	1					1	1
Total (11 NOCs)		8	8	8	8	8	40	64

== Performances by nation ==
Nation	Group stage	Semi-finals	Final	Winner(s)
China	8	6	3	3
Japan	3	2	1	1
Denmark	2	1	1	1
Indonesia	7	5	2	
Thailand (H)	6	2	2	
Chinese Taipei	2	1	1	
Malaysia	6	2		
South Korea	3	1		
France	1			
India	1			
Singapore	1			
Total	40	20	10	5

== Men's singles ==
=== Seeds ===
1. (Denmark) Viktor Axelsen (champion)
2. (Chinese Taipei) Chou Tien-chen (group stage)
3. (India) Prannoy H. S. (group stage)
4. (Indonesia) Jonatan Christie (semi-finals)

=== Group A ===
Pos	Team	Pld	W	L	GF	GA	GD	PF	PA	PD	Pts	Qualification
1	(Denmark) Viktor Axelsen	3	2	1	5	2	+3	140	100	+40	2 (Note: Head-to-head: Viktor Axelsen 2–0 Kodai Naraoka.)	Advance to semi-finals
2	(Japan) Kodai Naraoka	3	2	1	4	3	+1	113	126	−13	2	Advance to semi-finals
3	(China) Lu Guangzu	3	1	2	2	5	−3	119	145	−26	1 (Note: Head-to-head: Lu Guangzu 2–1 Prannoy H. S.)	
4	(India) Prannoy H. S.	3	1	2	4	5	−1	167	168	−1	1	

Source: TS
Rules for classification: Group stage tiebreakers
Notes:

Date	Player 1	Score	Player 2	Game 1	Game 2	Game 3
7 Dec	Prannoy H. S. (India)	1–2	(Japan) Kodai Naraoka	12–21	21–9	17–21
7 Dec	Viktor Axelsen (Denmark)	2–0	(China) Lu Guangzu	21–13	21–11	
8 Dec	Prannoy H. S. (India)	1–2	(China) Lu Guangzu	21–23	21–17	19–21
8 Dec	Viktor Axelsen (Denmark)	2–0	(Japan) Kodai Naraoka	21–5	21–15	
9 Dec	Viktor Axelsen (Denmark)	1–2	(India) Prannoy H. S.	21–14	17–21	18–21
9 Dec	Kodai Naraoka (Japan)	2–0	(China) Lu Guangzu	21–19	21–15	

=== Group B ===
Pos	Team	Pld	W	L	GF	GA	GD	PF	PA	PD	Pts	Qualification
1	(Indonesia) Anthony Sinisuka Ginting	3	3	0	6	2	+4	146	127	+19	3	Advance to semi-finals
2	(Indonesia) Jonatan Christie	3	2	1	5	4	+1	153	150	+3	2	Advance to semi-finals
3	(Singapore) Loh Kean Yew	3	1	2	3	4	−1	126	135	−9	1	
4	(Chinese Taipei) Chou Tien-chen	3	0	3	2	6	−4	137	150	−13	0	

Source: TS
Rules for classification: Group stage tiebreakers

Date	Player 1	Score	Player 2	Game 1	Game 2	Game 3
7 Dec	Jonatan Christie (Indonesia)	1–2	(Indonesia) Anthony Sinisuka Ginting	21–6	10–21	9–21
7 Dec	Chou Tien-chen (Chinese Taipei)	0–2	(Singapore) Loh Kean Yew	15–21	17–21	
8 Dec	Chou Tien-chen (Chinese Taipei)	1–2	(Indonesia) Anthony Sinisuka Ginting	14–21	21–12	19–21
8 Dec	Jonatan Christie (Indonesia)	2–1	(Singapore) Loh Kean Yew	16–21	22–20	21–10
9 Dec	Chou Tien-chen (Chinese Taipei)	1–2	(Indonesia) Jonatan Christie	13–21	21–12	17–21
9 Dec	Anthony Sinisuka Ginting (Indonesia)	2–0	(Singapore) Loh Kean Yew	21–12	23–21	

=== Finals ===
Semi-finals
1	(Denmark) Viktor Axelsen	21	21	21
(Japan) Kodai Naraoka	23	19	18
4	(Indonesia) Jonatan Christie	15	21	18
(Indonesia) Anthony Sinisuka Ginting	21	11	21

Final
1	(Denmark) Viktor Axelsen	21	21
(Indonesia) Anthony Sinisuka Ginting	13	14

== Women's singles ==
=== Seeds ===
1. (China) Chen Yufei (semi-finals)
2. (Chinese Taipei) Tai Tzu-ying (final)
3. (China) He Bingjiao (semi-finals)
4. (South Korea) An Se-young (group stage)

=== Group A ===
Pos	Team	Pld	W	L	GF	GA	GD	PF	PA	PD	Pts	Qualification
1	(China) Chen Yufei	3	2	1	5	2	+3	130	121	+9	2 (Note: Head-to-head: Chen Yufei 2–0 Akane Yamaguchi.)	Advance to semi-finals
2	(Japan) Akane Yamaguchi	3	2	1	4	3	+1	134	130	+4	2	Advance to semi-finals
3	(South Korea) An Se-young	3	1	2	2	5	−3	115	124	−9	1 (Note: Head-to-head: An Se-young 2–1 Gregoria Mariska Tunjung.)	
4	(Indonesia) Gregoria Mariska Tunjung	3	1	2	4	5	−1	150	154	−4	1	

Source: TS
Rules for classification: Group stage tiebreakers
Notes:

Date	Player 1	Score	Player 2	Game 1	Game 2	Game 3
7 Dec	Chen Yufei (China)	1–2	(Indonesia) Gregoria Mariska Tunjung	9–21	21–14	16–21
7 Dec	An Se-young (South Korea)	0–2	(Japan) Akane Yamaguchi	18–21	16–21	
8 Dec	An Se-young (South Korea)	2–1	(Indonesia) Gregoria Mariska Tunjung	21–9	11–21	21–10
8 Dec	Chen Yufei (China)	2–0	(Japan) Akane Yamaguchi	21–19	21–18	
9 Dec	Akane Yamaguchi (Japan)	2–1	(Indonesia) Gregoria Mariska Tunjung	21–15	13–21	21–18
9 Dec	Chen Yufei (China)	2–0	(South Korea) An Se-young	21–16	21–12	

=== Group B ===
Pos	Team	Pld	W	L	GF	GA	GD	PF	PA	PD	Pts	Qualification
1	(China) He Bingjiao	3	3	0	6	1	+5	138	131	+7	3	Advance to semi-finals
2	(Chinese Taipei) Tai Tzu-ying	3	2	1	4	3	+1	135	116	+19	2	Advance to semi-finals
3	(Thailand) Ratchanok Intanon	3	1	2	3	4	−1	119	127	−8	1	
4	(Thailand) Busanan Ongbamrungphan	3	0	3	1	6	−5	118	136	−18	0	

Source: TS
Rules for classification: Group stage tiebreakers

Date	Player 1	Score	Player 2	Game 1	Game 2	Game 3
7 Dec	Tai Tzu-ying (Chinese Taipei)	0–2	(China) He Bingjiao	19–21	19–21	
7 Dec	Ratchanok Intanon (Thailand)	2–0	(Thailand) Busanan Ongbamrungphan	21–15	21–13	
8 Dec	Tai Tzu-ying (Chinese Taipei)	2–0	(Thailand) Busanan Ongbamrungphan	22–20	21–16	
8 Dec	He Bingjiao (China)	2–0	(Thailand) Ratchanok Intanon	21–17	24–22	
9 Dec	He Bingjiao (China)	2–1	(Thailand) Busanan Ongbamrungphan	8–21	22–20	21–13
9 Dec	Tai Tzu-ying (Chinese Taipei)	2–1	(Thailand) Ratchanok Intanon	21–10	12–21	21–7

=== Finals ===
Semi-finals
1	(China) Chen Yufei	19	10
(Japan) Akane Yamaguchi	21	21
2	(Chinese Taipei) Tai Tzu-ying	21	21
3	(China) He Bingjiao	18	14

Final
(Japan) Akane Yamaguchi	21	22
2	(Chinese Taipei) Tai Tzu-ying	18	20

== Men's doubles ==
=== Seeds ===
1. (Indonesia) Fajar Alfian / Muhammad Rian Ardianto (semi-finals)
2. (Indonesia) Mohammad Ahsan / Hendra Setiawan (final)
3. (Malaysia) Ong Yew Sin / Teo Ee Yi (semi-finals)
4. (China) Liu Yuchen / Ou Xuanyi (champions)

=== Group A ===
Pos	Team	Pld	W	L	GF	GA	GD	PF	PA	PD	Pts	Qualification
1	(Malaysia) Ong Yew Sin (Malaysia) Teo Ee Yi	3	2	1	4	3	+1	131	137	−6	2 (Note: Head-to-head: Ong/Teo 2–1 Alfian/Ardianto.)	Advance to semi-finals
2	(Indonesia) Fajar Alfian (Indonesia) Muhammad Rian Ardianto	3	2	1	5	2	+3	143	123	+20	2	Advance to semi-finals
3	(South Korea) Choi Sol-gyu (South Korea) Kim Won-ho	3	1	2	2	4	−2	118	118	0	1 (Note: Head-to-head: Choi/Kim 2–0 Hoki/Kobayashi.)	
4	(Japan) Takuro Hoki (Japan) Yugo Kobayashi	3	1	2	2	4	−2	105	119	−14	1	

Source: TS
Rules for classification: Group stage tiebreakers
Notes:

Date	Pair 1	Score	Pair 2	Game 1	Game 2	Game 3
7 Dec	Fajar Alfian (Indonesia); Muhammad Rian Ardianto (Indonesia)	2–0	(South Korea) Choi Sol-gyu (South Korea) Kim Won-ho	23–21	21–17	
7 Dec	Ong Yew Sin (Malaysia); Teo Ee Yi (Malaysia)	0–2	(Japan) Takuro Hoki (Japan) Yugo Kobayashi	19–21	16–21	
8 Dec	Ong Yew Sin (Malaysia); Teo Ee Yi (Malaysia)	2–0	(South Korea) Choi Sol-gyu (South Korea) Kim Won-ho	21–17	23–21	
8 Dec	Fajar Alfian (Indonesia); Muhammad Rian Ardianto (Indonesia)	2–0	(Japan) Takuro Hoki (Japan) Yugo Kobayashi	21–18	21–15	
9 Dec	Fajar Alfian (Indonesia); Muhammad Rian Ardianto (Indonesia)	1–2	(Malaysia) Ong Yew Sin (Malaysia) Teo Ee Yi	21–10	17–21	19–21
9 Dec	Takuro Hoki (Japan); Yugo Kobayashi (Japan)	0–2	(South Korea) Choi Sol-gyu (South Korea) Kim Won-ho	11–21	19–21	

=== Group B ===
Pos	Team	Pld	W	L	GF	GA	GD	PF	PA	PD	Pts	Qualification
1	(China) Liu Yuchen (China) Ou Xuanyi	3	3	0	6	1	+5	150	122	+28	3	Advance to semi-finals
2	(Indonesia) Mohammad Ahsan (Indonesia) Hendra Setiawan	3	2	1	4	2	+2	115	94	+21	2	Advance to semi-finals
3	(Denmark) Kim Astrup (Denmark) Anders Skaarup Rasmussen	3	1	2	2	4	−2	99	124	−25	1	
4	(Malaysia) Aaron Chia (Malaysia) Soh Wooi Yik	3	0	3	1	6	−5	128	152	−24	0	

Source: TS
Rules for classification: Group stage tiebreakers

Date	Pair 1	Score	Pair 2	Game 1	Game 2	Game 3
7 Dec	Liu Yuchen (China); Ou Xuanyi (China)	2–0	(Denmark) Kim Astrup (Denmark) Anders Skaarup Rasmussen	21–11	21–19	
7 Dec	Mohammad Ahsan (Indonesia); Hendra Setiawan (Indonesia)	2–0	(Malaysia) Aaron Chia (Malaysia) Soh Wooi Yik	21–12	21–15	
8 Dec	Mohammad Ahsan (Indonesia); Hendra Setiawan (Indonesia)	2–0	(Denmark) Kim Astrup (Denmark) Anders Skaarup Rasmussen	21–13	21–12	
8 Dec	Liu Yuchen (China); Ou Xuanyi (China)	2–1	(Malaysia) Aaron Chia (Malaysia) Soh Wooi Yik	23–21	22–24	21–16
9 Dec	Kim Astrup (Denmark); Anders Skaarup Rasmussen (Denmark)	2–0	(Malaysia) Aaron Chia (Malaysia) Soh Wooi Yik	21–19	23–21	
9 Dec	Mohammad Ahsan (Indonesia); Hendra Setiawan (Indonesia)	0–2	(China) Liu Yuchen (China) Ou Xuanyi	13–21	18–21	

=== Finals ===
Semi-finals
3	(Malaysia) Ong Yew Sin (Malaysia) Teo Ee Yi	21	13	19
2	(Indonesia) Mohammad Ahsan (Indonesia) Hendra Setiawan	17	21	21
1	(Indonesia) Fajar Alfian (Indonesia) Muhammad Rian Ardianto	20	21	19
4	(China) Liu Yuchen (China) Ou Xuanyi	22	11	21

Final
2	(Indonesia) Mohammad Ahsan (Indonesia) Hendra Setiawan	17	21	12
4	(China) Liu Yuchen (China) Ou Xuanyi	21	19	21

== Women's doubles ==
=== Seeds ===
1. (South Korea) Jeong Na-eun / Kim Hye-jeong (semi-finals)
2. (China) Zhang Shuxian / Zheng Yu (semi-finals)
3. (Thailand) Benyapa Aimsaard / Nuntakarn Aimsaard (final)
4. (China) Chen Qingchen / Jia Yifan (champions)

=== Group A ===
Pos	Team	Pld	W	L	GF	GA	GD	PF	PA	PD	Pts	Qualification
1	(Thailand) Benyapa Aimsaard (Thailand) Nuntakarn Aimsaard	3	2	1	5	2	+3	136	96	+40	2	Advance to semi-finals
2	(South Korea) Jeong Na-eun (South Korea) Kim Hye-jeong	3	2	1	4	2	+2	107	99	+8	2	Advance to semi-finals
3	(Thailand) Jongkolphan Kititharakul (Thailand) Rawinda Prajongjai	3	2	1	4	3	+1	120	121	−1	2	
4	(Malaysia) Vivian Hoo (Malaysia) Lim Chiew Sien	3	0	3	0	6	−6	79	126	−47	0	

Source: TS
Rules for classification: Group stage tiebreakers

Date	Pair 1	Score	Pair 2	Game 1	Game 2	Game 3
7 Dec	Jeong Na-eun (South Korea); Kim Hye-jeong (South Korea)	2–0	(Malaysia) Vivian Hoo (Malaysia) Lim Chiew Sien	21–18	21–13	
7 Dec	Benyapa Aimsaard (Thailand); Nuntakarn Aimsaard (Thailand)	1–2	(Thailand) Jongkolphan Kititharakul (Thailand) Rawinda Prajongjai	19–21	21–10	12–21
8 Dec	Benyapa Aimsaard (Thailand); Nuntakarn Aimsaard (Thailand)	2–0	(Malaysia) Vivian Hoo (Malaysia) Lim Chiew Sien	21–9	21–12	
8 Dec	Jeong Na-eun (South Korea); Kim Hye-jeong (South Korea)	2–0	(Thailand) Jongkolphan Kititharakul (Thailand) Rawinda Prajongjai	21–14	21–12	
9 Dec	Jongkolphan Kititharakul (Thailand); Rawinda Prajongjai (Thailand)	2–0	(Malaysia) Vivian Hoo (Malaysia) Lim Chiew Sien	21–10	21–17	
9 Dec	Jeong Na-eun (South Korea); Kim Hye-jeong (South Korea)	0–2	(Thailand) Benyapa Aimsaard (Thailand) Nuntakarn Aimsaard	15–21	8–21	

=== Group B ===
Pos	Team	Pld	W	L	GF	GA	GD	PF	PA	PD	Pts	Qualification
1	(China) Chen Qingchen (China) Jia Yifan	3	3	0	6	1	+5	143	113	+30	3	Advance to semi-finals
2	(China) Zhang Shuxian (China) Zheng Yu	3	2	1	5	3	+2	157	142	+15	2	Advance to semi-finals
3	(Indonesia) Apriyani Rahayu (Indonesia) Siti Fadia Silva Ramadhanti	3	1	2	2	4	−2	109	124	−15	1	
4	(Malaysia) Pearly Tan (Malaysia) Thinaah Muralitharan	3	0	3	1	6	−5	118	148	−30	0	

Source: TS
Rules for classification: Group stage tiebreakers

Date	Pair 1	Score	Pair 2	Game 1	Game 2	Game 3
7 Dec	Zhang Shuxian (China); Zheng Yu (China)	1–2	(China) Chen Qingchen (China) Jia Yifan	18–21	21–17	14–21
7 Dec	Pearly Tan (Malaysia); Thinaah Muralitharan (Malaysia)	0–2	(Indonesia) Apriyani Rahayu (Indonesia) Siti Fadia Silva Ramadhanti	21–23	19–21	
8 Dec	Chen Qingchen (China); Jia Yifan (China)	2–0	(Malaysia) Pearly Tan (Malaysia) Thinaah Muralitharan	21–13	21–15	
8 Dec	Zhang Shuxian (China); Zheng Yu (China)	2–0	(Indonesia) Apriyani Rahayu (Indonesia) Siti Fadia Silva Ramadhanti	21–14	21–19	
9 Dec	Chen Qingchen (China); Jia Yifan (China)	2–0	(Indonesia) Apriyani Rahayu (Indonesia) Siti Fadia Silva Ramadhanti	21–16	21–16	
9 Dec	Zhang Shuxian (China); Zheng Yu (China)	2–1	(Malaysia) Pearly Tan (Malaysia) Thinaah Muralitharan	21–19	20–22	21–9

=== Finals ===
Semi-finals
3	(Thailand) Benyapa Aimsaard (Thailand) Nuntakarn Aimsaard	22	21
1	(South Korea) Jeong Na-eun (South Korea) Kim Hye-jeong	20	15
2	(China) Zhang Shuxian (China) Zheng Yu	19	13
4	(China) Chen Qingchen (China) Jia Yifan	21	21

Final
3	(Thailand) Benyapa Aimsaard (Thailand) Nuntakarn Aimsaard	13	14
4	(China) Chen Qingchen (China) Jia Yifan	21	21

== Mixed doubles ==
=== Seeds ===
1. (China) Zheng Siwei / Huang Yaqiong (champions)
2. (Thailand) Dechapol Puavaranukroh / Sapsiree Taerattanachai (final)
3. (China) Wang Yilyu / Huang Dongping (group stage)
4. (Malaysia) Goh Soon Huat / Shevon Jemie Lai (group stage)

=== Group A ===
Pos	Team	Pld	W	L	GF	GA	GD	PF	PA	PD	Pts	Qualification
1	(China) Zheng Siwei (China) Huang Yaqiong	2	2	0	4	0	+4	85	46	+39	2	Advance to semi-finals
2	(Indonesia) Rinov Rivaldy (Indonesia) Pitha Haningtyas Mentari	2	1	1	2	3	−1	88	103	−15	1	Advance to semi-finals
3	(France) Thom Gicquel (France) Delphine Delrue	2	0	2	1	4	−3	77	101	−24	0	
4	(Malaysia) Goh Soon Huat (Malaysia) Shevon Jemie Lai (Z)	0	0	0	0	0	0	0	0	0	0	

Source: TS
Rules for classification: Group stage tiebreakers
(Z) Withdrew after two matches.

Date	Pair 1	Score	Pair 2	Game 1	Game 2	Game 3
7 Dec	Goh Soon Huat (Malaysia); Shevon Jemie Lai (Malaysia)	~~0–2~~ (voided)	(Indonesia) Rinov Rivaldy (Indonesia) Pitha Haningtyas Mentari	~~12–21~~	~~15–21~~	
7 Dec	Zheng Siwei (China); Huang Yaqiong (China)	2–0	(France) Thom Gicquel (France) Delphine Delrue	21–8	21–9	
8 Dec	Zheng Siwei (China); Huang Yaqiong (China)	2–0	(Indonesia) Rinov Rivaldy (Indonesia) Pitha Haningtyas Mentari	21–9	22–20	
8 Dec	Goh Soon Huat (Malaysia); Shevon Jemie Lai (Malaysia)	~~1–2~~ (voided)	(France) Thom Gicquel (France) Delphine Delrue	~~21–16~~	~~18–21~~	~~17–21~~
9 Dec	Rinov Rivaldy (Indonesia); Pitha Haningtyas Mentari (Indonesia)	2–1	(France) Thom Gicquel (France) Delphine Delrue	14–21	21–17	24–22
9 Dec	Zheng Siwei (China); Huang Yaqiong (China)	N/P	(Malaysia) Goh Soon Huat (Malaysia) Shevon Jemie Lai	Cancelled		

=== Group B ===
Pos	Team	Pld	W	L	GF	GA	GD	PF	PA	PD	Pts	Qualification
1	(Thailand) Dechapol Puavaranukroh (Thailand) Sapsiree Taerattanachai	3	3	0	6	0	+6	132	83	+49	3	Advance to semi-finals
2	(Malaysia) Tan Kian Meng (Malaysia) Lai Pei Jing	3	2	1	4	3	+1	121	137	−16	2	Advance to semi-finals
3	(China) Wang Yilyu (China) Huang Dongping	3	1	2	3	4	−1	134	125	+9	1	
4	(Thailand) Supak Jomkoh (Thailand) Supissara Paewsampran	3	0	3	0	6	−6	89	131	−42	0	

Source: TS
Rules for classification: Group stage tiebreakers

Date	Pair 1	Score	Pair 2	Game 1	Game 2	Game 3
7 Dec	Dechapol Puavaranukroh (Thailand); Sapsiree Taerattanachai (Thailand)	2–0	(Thailand) Supak Jomkoh (Thailand) Supissara Paewsampran	21–6	25–23	
7 Dec	Wang Yilyu (China); Huang Dongping (China)	1–2	(Malaysia) Tan Kian Meng (Malaysia) Lai Pei Jing	21–23	21–14	16–21
8 Dec	Wang Yilyu (China); Huang Dongping (China)	2–0	(Thailand) Supak Jomkoh (Thailand) Supissara Paewsampran	21–16	21–7	
8 Dec	Dechapol Puavaranukroh (Thailand); Sapsiree Taerattanachai (Thailand)	2–0	(Malaysia) Tan Kian Meng (Malaysia) Lai Pei Jing	21–9	21–11	
9 Dec	Tan Kian Meng (Malaysia); Lai Pei Jing (Malaysia)	2–0	(Thailand) Supak Jomkoh (Thailand) Supissara Paewsampran	21–17	22–20	
9 Dec	Dechapol Puavaranukroh (Thailand); Sapsiree Taerattanachai (Thailand)	2–0	(China) Wang Yilyu (China) Huang Dongping	23–21	21–13	

=== Finals ===
Semi-finals
1	(China) Zheng Siwei (China) Huang Yaqiong	21	21
(Malaysia) Tan Kian Meng (Malaysia) Lai Pei Jing	10	15
(Indonesia) Rinov Rivaldy (Indonesia) Pitha Haningtyas Mentari	22	21	14
2	(Thailand) Dechapol Puavaranukroh (Thailand) Sapsiree Taerattanachai	24	16	21

Final
1	(China) Zheng Siwei (China) Huang Yaqiong	21	18	21
2	(Thailand) Dechapol Puavaranukroh (Thailand) Sapsiree Taerattanachai	19	21	13

Preceded by 2022 Australian Open	BWF World Tour; 2022 BWF season	Succeeded by 2023 Malaysia Open
