= 2022 Hylo Open =

2022 badminton tournament in Saarbrücken

Tournament details
- Dates: 1–6 November
- Level: Super 300
- Total prize money: US$180,000
- Venue: Saarlandhalle
- Location: Saarbrücken, Germany

Champions
- Men's singles: (Indonesia) Anthony Sinisuka Ginting
- Women's singles: (China) Han Yue
- Men's doubles: (Chinese Taipei) Lu Ching-yao (Chinese Taipei) Yang Po-han
- Women's doubles: (Thailand) Benyapa Aimsaard (Thailand) Nuntakarn Aimsaard
- Mixed doubles: (Indonesia) Rehan Naufal Kusharjanto (Indonesia) Lisa Ayu Kusumawati

The 2022 Hylo Open was a badminton tournament which took place at the Saarlandhalle in Saarbrücken, Germany, from 1 to 6 November 2022 and had a total prize of US$180,000.

== Tournament ==
The 2022 Hylo Open was the nineteenth tournament according to the 2022 BWF World Tour. It was a part of the Hylo Open, which had been held since 1988. This tournament was organized by the local organizer with sanction from the BWF.

=== Venue ===
This international tournament was held at the Saarlandhalle in Saarbrücken, Germany.

=== Point distribution ===
Below is the point distribution table for each phase of the tournament based on the BWF points system for the BWF World Tour Super 300 event.

Winner	Runner-up	3/4	5/8	9/16	17/32
7,000	5,950	4,900	3,850	2,750	1,670

=== Prize money ===
The total prize money for this tournament was US$180,000. The distribution of the prize money was in accordance with BWF regulations.

Event	Winner	Finalist	Semi-finals	Quarter-finals	Last 16
Singles	$13,500	$6,840	$2,610	$1,080	$630
Doubles	$14,220	$6,840	$2,520	$1,305	$675

== Men's singles ==
=== Seeds ===
1. (Denmark) Anders Antonsen (withdrew)
2. (Malaysia) Lee Zii Jia (withdrew)
3. (Chinese Taipei) Chou Tien-chen (final)
4. (Singapore) Loh Kean Yew (quarter-finals)
5. (Indonesia) Anthony Sinisuka Ginting (champion)
6. (Indonesia) Jonatan Christie (quarter-finals)
7. (India) Lakshya Sen (first round)
8. (Thailand) Kunlavut Vitidsarn (quarter-finals)

=== Finals ===
Semi-finals
(France) Toma Junior Popov	17	11
3	(Chinese Taipei) Chou Tien-chen	21	21
5	(Indonesia) Anthony Sinisuka Ginting	21	21
(India) Srikanth Kidambi	18	15

Final
3	(Chinese Taipei) Chou Tien-chen	21	11	22
5	(Indonesia) Anthony Sinisuka Ginting	18	21	24

=== Top half ===
==== Section 1 ====
First round
PFR	(Thailand) S Thammasin	11	16
(Malaysia) Liew D	21	21
(Malaysia) Ng T Y	12	14
(China) Li SF	21	21
7	(India) L Sen	12	5
(Hong Kong) Ng K L	21	21
(France) T J Popov	14	21	21
(Netherlands) M Caljouw	21	7	14

Second round
(Malaysia) Liew D	18	10
(China) Li SF	21	21
(Hong Kong) Ng K L	17	21	18
(France) T J Popov	21	17	21

Quarter-finals
(China) Li SF	16	16
(France) T J Popov	21	21

==== Section 2 ====
First round
3	(Chinese Taipei) Chou T-c	21	21
(China) Zhao JP	12	16
(Japan) K Tsuneyama	21	21
PFR	(France) B Leverdez	2	16
8	(Thailand) K Vitidsarn	18	21	21
(Denmark) H-K Vittinghus	21	16	6
(Denmark) R Gemke
(Hong Kong) Lee C Y	w	/	o

Second round
3	(Chinese Taipei) Chou T-c	21	28
(Japan) K Tsuneyama	16	26
8	(Thailand) K Vitidsarn	21	20	21
(Hong Kong) Lee C Y	18	22	5

Quarter-finals
3	(Chinese Taipei) Chou T-c	21	21
8	(Thailand) K Vitidsarn	10	10

=== Bottom half ===
==== Section 3 ====
First round
PFR	(France) C Popov	21	9	15
(Japan) K Naraoka	11	21	21
(Republic of Ireland) N Nguyen	13	10
5	(Indonesia) A S Ginting	21	21
(Indonesia) S H Rhustavito	w	/	o
(India) Prannoy H. S.
(China) Shi YQ	5	20
4	(Singapore) Loh K Y	21	22

Second round
(Japan) K Naraoka	13	19
5	(Indonesia) A S Ginting	21	21
(Indonesia) S H Rhustavito	21	15	19
4	(Singapore) Loh K Y	17	21	21

Quarter-finals
5	(Indonesia) A S Ginting	21	21
4	(Singapore) Loh K Y	13	14

==== Section 4 ====
First round
(Indonesia) C A Dwi Wardoyo	16	21	21
(Canada) B Yang	21	18	13
(India) Sa Verma	5^{r}
6	(Indonesia) J Christie	10
(India) S Kidambi	15	21	21
(China) Lu GZ	21	14	13
(Thailand) K Wangcharoen	7	12
PFR	(France) A Merklé	21	21

Second round
(Indonesia) C A Dwi Wardoyo	18	28
6	(Indonesia) J Christie	21	30
(India) S Kidambi	11	21	21
PFR	(France) A Merklé	21	13	10

Quarter-finals
6	(Indonesia) J Christie	13	19
(India) S Kidambi	21	21

== Women's singles ==
=== Seeds ===
1. (Spain) Carolina Marín (quarter-finals)
2. (Thailand) Pornpawee Chochuwong (second round)
3. (Japan) Nozomi Okuhara (semi-finals)
4. (Thailand) Busanan Ongbamrungphan (second round)
5. (Canada) Michelle Li (withdrew)
6. (Denmark) Mia Blichfeldt (first round)
7. (Scotland) Kirsty Gilmour (second round)
8. (Denmark) Line Christophersen (second round)

=== Finals ===
Semi-finals
(China) Zhang Yiman	21	21
3	(Japan) Nozomi Okuhara	18	17
(China) Han Yue	21	21
(Indonesia) Gregoria Mariska Tunjung	19	19

Final
(China) Zhang Yiman	18	16
(China) Han Yue	21	21

=== Top half ===
==== Section 1 ====
First round
1	(Spain) C Marín	21	21
(Spain) B Corrales	14	10
(Chinese Taipei) Pai Y-p	21	15	12
(Singapore) Yeo J M	16	21	21
8	(Denmark) L Christophersen	21	21
PFR	(Wales) J Hart	10	18
(United States) I Wang	18	21	17
(China) Zhang YM	21	17	21

Second round
1	(Spain) C Marín	21	21
(Singapore) Yeo J M	14	17
8	(Denmark) L Christophersen	18	17
(China) Zhang YM	21	21

Quarter-finals
1	(Spain) C Marín	21	19	19
(China) Zhang YM	19	21	21

==== Section 2 ====
First round
3	(Japan) N Okuhara	23	21
(United States) L Lam	21	15
(France) Qi XF	21	21
(Estonia) K Kuuba	19	14
PFR	(France) Y Hoyaux	16	18
(Chinese Taipei) Hsu W-c	21	21
(Denmark) J D Jakobsen	11	19
(Thailand) L Chaiwan	21	21

Second round
3	(Japan) N Okuhara	21	21
(France) Qi XF	19	16
(Chinese Taipei) Hsu W-c	21	19	21
(Thailand) L Chaiwan	11	21	15

Quarter-finals
3	(Japan) N Okuhara	19	21	21
(Chinese Taipei) Hsu W-c	21	17	15

=== Bottom half ===
==== Section 3 ====
First round
(France) L Huet	11	21	7
(India) A Kashyap	21	12	21
(Denmark) L Kjærsfeldt	13	21	21
6	(Denmark) M Blichfeldt	21	19	11
(China) Han Y	21	21
(Germany) Y Li	7	9
(India) S Nehwal	15	8
4	(Thailand) B Ongbamrungphan	21	21

Second round
(India) A Kashyap	13	14
(Denmark) L Kjærsfeldt	21	21
(China) Han Y	21	21
4	(Thailand) B Ongbamrungphan	14	13

Quarter-finals
(Denmark) L Kjærsfeldt	17	12
(China) Han Y	21	21

==== Section 4 ====
First round
(India) M Bansod	20	21	21
(Spain) C Azurmendi	22	12	6
(Thailand) S Katethong	21	21	15
7	(Scotland) K Gilmour	17	23	21
(Indonesia) G M Tunjung	21	21
(Belgium) L Tan	15	10
PFR	(Malaysia) Goh J W	14	10
2	(Thailand) P Chochuwong	21	21

Second round
(India) M Bansod	24	19
7	(Scotland) K Gilmour	22	7^{r}
(Indonesia) G M Tunjung	21	20	22
2	(Thailand) P Chochuwong	14	22	20

Quarter-finals
(India) M Bansod	17	10
(Indonesia) G M Tunjung	21	21

== Men's doubles ==
=== Seeds ===
1. (Japan) Takuro Hoki / Yugo Kobayashi (quarter-finals)
2. (Denmark) Kim Astrup / Anders Skaarup Rasmussen (semi-finals)
3. (India) Satwiksairaj Rankireddy / Chirag Shetty (quarter-finals)
4. (Malaysia) Goh Sze Fei / Nur Izzuddin (withdrew)
5. (Germany) Mark Lamsfuß / Marvin Seidel (quarter-finals)
6. (China) Liang Weikeng / Wang Chang (quarter-finals)
7. (England) Ben Lane / Sean Vendy (semi-finals)
8. (Indonesia) Muhammad Shohibul Fikri / Bagas Maulana (first round)

=== Finals ===
Semi-finals
(Chinese Taipei) Lee Jhe-huei (Chinese Taipei) Yang Po-hsuan	21	21
7	(England) Ben Lane (England) Sean Vendy	9	17
(Chinese Taipei) Lu Ching-yao (Chinese Taipei) Yang Po-han	21	15	21
2	(Denmark) Kim Astrup (Denmark) Anders Skaarup Rasmussen	14	21	14

Final
(Chinese Taipei) Lee Jhe-huei (Chinese Taipei) Yang Po-hsuan	21	17	23
(Chinese Taipei) Lu Ching-yao (Chinese Taipei) Yang Po-han	11	21	25

=== Top half ===
==== Section 1 ====
First round
1	(Japan) T Hoki (Japan) Y Kobayashi	21	21
(Denmark) D Lundgaard (Denmark) M Thyrri	18	9
PFR	(Azerbaijan) A R Dwicahyo (Azerbaijan) A Qowimuramadhoni	13	16
(Indonesia) L R Carnando (Indonesia) D Marthin	21	21
8	(Indonesia) M S Fikri (Indonesia) B Maulana	17	18
(Chinese Taipei) Lee J-h (Chinese Taipei) Yang P-hs	21	21
PFR	(Czech Republic) O Král (Czech Republic) A Mendrek	25	12
(Germany) B Geiss (Germany) J C Völker	27	21

Second round
1	(Japan) T Hoki (Japan) Y Kobayashi	21	21
(Indonesia) L R Carnando (Indonesia) D Marthin	16	18
(Chinese Taipei) Lee J-h (Chinese Taipei) Yang P-hs	21	21
(Germany) B Geiss (Germany) J C Völker	10	17

Quarter-finals
1	(Japan) T Hoki (Japan) Y Kobayashi	21	19	21
(Chinese Taipei) Lee J-h (Chinese Taipei) Yang P-hs	14	21	23

==== Section 2 ====
First round
3	(India) S Rankireddy (India) C Shetty	19	21	21
(Chinese Taipei) Lee Y (Chinese Taipei) Lu C	21	19	16
(Republic of Ireland) J Magee (Republic of Ireland) P Reynolds	18	19
(England) R Easton (England) Z Russ	21	21
7	(England) B Lane (England) S Vendy	21	21
(Chinese Taipei) Su C-h (Chinese Taipei) Ye H-w	18	16
(Norway) T Flåtten (Norway) V Rikheim	12	16
(France) J Maio (France) W Villeger	21	21

Second round
3	(India) S Rankireddy (India) C Shetty	22	21	21
(England) R Easton (England) Z Russ	24	15	11
7	(England) B Lane (England) S Vendy	21	25
(France) J Maio (France) W Villeger	14	23

Quarter-finals
3	(India) S Rankireddy (India) C Shetty	17	14
7	(England) B Lane (England) S Vendy	21	21

=== Bottom half ===
==== Section 3 ====
First round
(Malaysia) Tan K M (Malaysia) Tan W K	21	20	21
(France) L Corvée (France) R Labar	17	22	18
(Scotland) C Grimley (Scotland) M Grimley	17	17
6	(China) Liang WK (China) Wang C	21	21
(Chinese Taipei) Chang K-c (Chinese Taipei) Po L-w	9	16
(Chinese Taipei) Lu C-y (Chinese Taipei) Yang P-h	21	21
(India) Arjun M. R. (India) D Kapila
PFR	(Denmark) R Kjær (Denmark) F Søgaard	w	/	o

Second round
(Malaysia) Tan K M (Malaysia) Tan W K	14	18
6	(China) Liang WK (China) Wang C	21	21
(Chinese Taipei) Lu C-y (Chinese Taipei) Yang P-h	21	12	21
PFR	(Denmark) R Kjær (Denmark) F Søgaard	13	21	19

Quarter-finals
6	(China) Liang WK (China) Wang C	19	21	19
(Chinese Taipei) Lu C-y (Chinese Taipei) Yang P-h	21	19	21

==== Section 4 ====
First round
(China) Liu YC (China) Ou XY	18	21	21
(France) C Popov (France) T J Popov	21	15	18
(Netherlands) R Jille (Netherlands) T van der Lecq	17	12
5	(Germany) M Lamsfuß (Germany) M Seidel	21	21
(India) K P Garaga (India) V G Panjala	22	21	21
PFR	(India) P. S. Ravikrishna (India) S P Udayakumar	24	12	17
(Scotland) A Dunn (Scotland) A Hall	8	12
2	(Denmark) K Astrup (Denmark) A S Rasmussen	21	21

Second round
(China) Liu YC (China) Ou XY	18	12
5	(Germany) M Lamsfuß (Germany) M Seidel	21	21
(India) K P Garaga (India) V G Panjala	17	13
2	(Denmark) K Astrup (Denmark) A S Rasmussen	21	21

Quarter-finals
5	(Germany) M Lamsfuß (Germany) M Seidel	15	25
2	(Denmark) K Astrup (Denmark) A S Rasmussen	21	27

== Women's doubles ==
=== Seeds ===
1. (Thailand) Jongkolphan Kititharakul / Rawinda Prajongjai (final)
2. (Bulgaria) Gabriela Stoeva / Stefani Stoeva (second round)
3. (Malaysia) Pearly Tan / Thinaah Muralitharan (withdrew)
4. (China) Zhang Shuxian / Zheng Yu (semi-finals)
5. (China) Du Yue / Li Wenmei (withdrew)
6. (England) Chloe Birch / Lauren Smith (withdrew)
7. (Denmark) Maiken Fruergaard / Sara Thygesen (withdrew)
8. (Thailand) Benyapa Aimsaard / Nuntakarn Aimsaard (champions)

=== Finals ===
Semi-finals
1	(Thailand) Jongkolphan Kititharakul (Thailand) Rawinda Prajongjai	21	27
4	(China) Zhang Shuxian (China) Zheng Yu	17	25
(India) Treesa Jolly (India) Gayatri Gopichand	21	14	18
8	(Thailand) Benyapa Aimsaard (Thailand) Nuntakarn Aimsaard	17	21	21

Final
1	(Thailand) Jongkolphan Kititharakul (Thailand) Rawinda Prajongjai	18	21	17
8	(Thailand) Benyapa Aimsaard (Thailand) Nuntakarn Aimsaard	21	18	21

=== Top half ===
==== Section 1 ====
First round
1	(Thailand) J Kititharakul (Thailand) R Prajongjai	8	21	21
(Chinese Taipei) Lee C-h (Chinese Taipei) Teng C-h	21	13	7
(Scotland) J MacPherson (Scotland) C Torrance	21	21
PFR	(Poland) D Kwaśnik (Poland) K Marczak	14	12
PFR	(Sweden) M Sjöö (Sweden) T Sjöö	21	18	21
(Estonia) K-K Marran (Estonia) H Rüütel	18	21	13
(France) M Lambert (France) A Tran	21	21
(Ukraine) M Stoliarenko (Ukraine) Y Zharka	17	13

Second round
1	(Thailand) J Kititharakul (Thailand) R Prajongjai	21	21
(Scotland) J MacPherson (Scotland) C Torrance	5	12
PFR	(Sweden) M Sjöö (Sweden) T Sjöö	18	15
(France) M Lambert (France) A Tran	21	21

Quarter-finals
1	(Thailand) J Kititharakul (Thailand) R Prajongjai	21	21
(France) M Lambert (France) A Tran	15	15

==== Section 2 ====
First round
4	(China) Zhang SX (China) Zheng Y	21	21
(Indonesia) F D Kusuma (Indonesia) A C Pratiwi	14	13
(France) F Vallet (France) E Vercelot	17	7
(Germany) S Küspert (Germany) E Moszczynski	21	21
PFR	(Chinese Taipei) Hu L-f (Chinese Taipei) Lin X-m	21	21
(Republic of Ireland) K Frost (Republic of Ireland) M Ryan	11	9
(India) R Panda (India) S Panda	w	/	o
(India) T Crasto (India) S Mishra

Second round
4	(China) Zhang SX (China) Zheng Y	21	21
(Germany) S Küspert (Germany) E Moszczynski	7	8
PFR	(Chinese Taipei) Hu L-f (Chinese Taipei) Lin X-m	21	21
(India) R Panda (India) S Panda	16	7

Quarter-finals
4	(China) Zhang SX (China) Zheng Y	21	21
PFR	(Chinese Taipei) Hu L-f (Chinese Taipei) Lin X-m	15	14

=== Bottom half ===
==== Section 3 ====
First round
(Chinese Taipei) Hsu Y-c (Chinese Taipei) Lin W-c	21	21
(Chinese Taipei) Chang C-h (Chinese Taipei) Yang C-t	13	16
(Spain) C Azurmendi (Spain) B Corrales	w	/	o
5	(China) Du Y (China) Li WM
(Germany) L Efler (Germany) I Lohau	18	15
(India) T Jolly (India) G Gopichand	21	21
(Netherlands) D Jille (Netherlands) C Seinen	w	/	o
3	(Malaysia) P Tan (Malaysia) Thinaah M

Second round
(Chinese Taipei) Hsu Y-c (Chinese Taipei) Lin W-c	21	21
(Spain) C Azurmendi (Spain) B Corrales	11	12
(India) T Jolly (India) G Gopichand	21	21
(Netherlands) D Jille (Netherlands) C Seinen	18	19

Quarter-finals
(Chinese Taipei) Hsu Y-c (Chinese Taipei) Lin W-c	17	21	8
(India) T Jolly (India) G Gopichand	21	18	21

==== Section 4 ====
First round
(India) S Singhi (India) R Thaker	11	12
(Malaysia) V Hoo (Malaysia) Lim C S	21	21
(Italy) M Corsini (Italy) J Mair	17	10
8	(Thailand) B Aimsaard (Thailand) N Aimsaard	21	21
(Hong Kong) Yeung N T (Hong Kong) Yeung P L	w	/	o
(Hong Kong) Ng T Y (Hong Kong) Tsang H Y
(Austria) S Au Yeong (Austria) K Hochmeir	7	8
2	(Bulgaria) G Stoeva (Bulgaria) S Stoeva	21	21

Second round
(Malaysia) V Hoo (Malaysia) Lim C S	8	14
8	(Thailand) B Aimsaard (Thailand) N Aimsaard	21	21
(Hong Kong) Yeung N T (Hong Kong) Yeung P L	21	21
2	(Bulgaria) G Stoeva (Bulgaria) S Stoeva	19	14

Quarter-finals
8	(Thailand) B Aimsaard (Thailand) N Aimsaard	21	18	21
(Hong Kong) Yeung N T (Hong Kong) Yeung P L	10	21	17

== Mixed doubles ==
=== Seeds ===
1. (Japan) Yuta Watanabe / Arisa Higashino (withdrew)
2. (France) Thom Gicquel / Delphine Delrue (semi-finals)
3. (Germany) Mark Lamsfuß / Isabel Lohau (first round)
4. (Malaysia) Tan Kian Meng / Lai Pei Jing (first round)
5. (Denmark) Mathias Christiansen / Alexandra Bøje (quarter-finals)
6. (Malaysia) Goh Soon Huat / Shevon Jemie Lai (second round)
7. (Indonesia) Rinov Rivaldy / Pitha Haningtyas Mentari (quarter-finals)
8. (Netherlands) Robin Tabeling / Selena Piek (second round)

=== Finals ===
Semi-finals
(China) Feng Yanzhe (China) Huang Dongping	21	21
(Denmark) Mathias Thyrri (Denmark) Amalie Magelund	19	18
(Indonesia) Rehan Naufal Kusharjanto (Indonesia) Lisa Ayu Kusumawati	21	21	21
2	(France) Thom Gicquel (France) Delphine Delrue	23	14	7

Final
(China) Feng Yanzhe (China) Huang Dongping	17	15
(Indonesia) Rehan Naufal Kusharjanto (Indonesia) Lisa Ayu Kusumawati	21	21

=== Top half ===
==== Section 1 ====
First round
PFR	(Scotland) A Dunn (Scotland) C Torrance	18	21	21
(Netherlands) T van der Lecq (Netherlands) D Jille	21	18	14
(Chinese Taipei) Lee Y (Chinese Taipei) Yang C-t	11	22
(Japan) H Midorikawa (Japan) N Saito	21	24
8	(Netherlands) R Tabeling (Netherlands) S Piek	21	21
(England) C Hemming (England) J Pugh	16	9
(China) Feng YZ (China) Huang DP	21	21
(India) I Bhatnagar (India) T Crasto	13	12

Second round
PFR	(Scotland) A Dunn (Scotland) C Torrance	15	13
(Japan) H Midorikawa (Japan) N Saito	21	21
8	(Netherlands) R Tabeling (Netherlands) S Piek	15	8
(China) Feng YZ (China) Huang DP	21	21

Quarter-finals
(Japan) H Midorikawa (Japan) N Saito	20	14
(China) Feng YZ (China) Huang DP	22	21

==== Section 2 ====
First round
4	(Malaysia) Tan K M (Malaysia) Lai P J	6	13
(Chinese Taipei) Ye H-w (Chinese Taipei) Lee C-h	21	21
(Indonesia) Z J Sumanti (Indonesia) H Julimarbela	23	17	9^{r}
(Denmark) M Thyrri (Denmark) A Magelund	21	21	15
7	(Indonesia) R Rivaldy (Indonesia) P H Mentari	18	21	21
(Germany) J R Jansen (Germany) L Efler	21	13	19
(Hong Kong) Lee C H (Hong Kong) Ng T Y
PFR	(France) L Corvée (France) S Bauer	w	/	o

Second round
(Chinese Taipei) Ye H-w (Chinese Taipei) Lee C-h	14	21	20
(Denmark) M Thyrri (Denmark) A Magelund	21	12	22
7	(Indonesia) R Rivaldy (Indonesia) P H Mentari	23	21
PFR	(France) L Corvée (France) S Bauer	21	11

Quarter-finals
(Denmark) M Thyrri (Denmark) A Magelund	21	13	21
7	(Indonesia) R Rivaldy (Indonesia) P H Mentari	19	21	17

=== Bottom half ===
==== Section 3 ====
First round
(Scotland) A Hall (Scotland) J MacPherson	19	17
(Chinese Taipei) Lee J-h (Chinese Taipei) Hsu Y-c	21	21
(Chinese Taipei) Yang P-hs (Chinese Taipei) Hu L-f	13	17
5	(Denmark) M Christiansen (Denmark) A Bøje	21	21
(Germany) P Scheiel (Germany) F Volkmann	18	15
(France) W Villeger (France) A Tran	21	21
(Indonesia) R N Kusharjanto (Indonesia) L A Kusumawati	21	21
3	(Germany) M Lamsfuß (Germany) I Lohau	17	14

Second round
(Chinese Taipei) Lee J-h (Chinese Taipei) Hsu Y-c	11	21	16
5	(Denmark) M Christiansen (Denmark) A Bøje	21	17	21
(France) W Villeger (France) A Tran	11	10
(Indonesia) R N Kusharjanto (Indonesia) L A Kusumawati	21	21

Quarter-finals
5	(Denmark) M Christiansen (Denmark) A Bøje	12	8
(Indonesia) R N Kusharjanto (Indonesia) L A Kusumawati	21	21

==== Section 4 ====
First round
PFR	(Scotland) C Grimley (Scotland) E O'Donnell	15	16
(England) G Mairs (England) J Moore	21	21
(Malaysia) Hoo P R (Malaysia) Toh E W	11	21	17
6	(Malaysia) Goh S H (Malaysia) S J Lai	21	12	21
(Denmark) M Mikkelsen (Denmark) R Søby Hansen	15	21	13
(Singapore) T Hee (Singapore) Tan W H	21	17	21
PFR	(Austria) P Birker (Austria) K Hochmeir	17	15
2	(France) T Gicquel (France) D Delrue	21	21

Second round
(England) G Mairs (England) J Moore	17	21	21
6	(Malaysia) Goh S H (Malaysia) S J Lai	21	10	17
(Singapore) T Hee (Singapore) Tan W H	15	21	17
2	(France) T Gicquel (France) D Delrue	21	15	21

Quarter-finals
(England) G Mairs (England) J Moore	21	14
2	(France) T Gicquel (France) D Delrue	23	21

Preceded by 2021 Hylo Open	Hylo Open	Succeeded by 2023 Hylo Open
Preceded by 2022 French Open	BWF World Tour; 2022 BWF season	Succeeded by 2022 Australian Open
