= 2022 Australian Open (badminton) =

2022 badminton tournament in Sydney

Tournament details
- Dates: 15–20 November
- Level: Super 300
- Total prize money: US$180,000
- Venue: State Sports Centre
- Location: Sydney, Australia

Champions
- Men's singles: (China) Shi Yuqi
- Women's singles: (South Korea) An Se-young
- Men's doubles: (China) Liu Yuchen (China) Ou Xuanyi
- Women's doubles: (China) Zhang Shuxian (China) Zheng Yu
- Mixed doubles: (South Korea) Seo Seung-jae (South Korea) Chae Yoo-jung

The 2022 Australian Open (officially known as the Sathio Group Australian Open 2022 for sponsorship reasons) was a badminton tournament which took place at the State Sports Centre in Sydney, Australia, from 15 to 20 November 2022 and had a total prize of US$180,000.

== Tournament ==
The 2022 Australian Open was the twentieth and final tournament in the 2022 BWF World Tour prior to the World Tour Finals. It was a part of the Australian Open, which had been held since 1975. This tournament was organized by Badminton Australia with sanction from the BWF.

=== Venue ===
This international tournament was held at the State Sports Centre in Sydney, Australia.

=== Point distribution ===
Below is the point distribution table for each phase of the tournament based on the BWF points system for the BWF World Tour Super 300 event.

Winner	Runner-up	3/4	5/8	9/16	17/32	33/64	65/128
7,000	5,950	4,900	3,850	2,750	1,670	660	320

=== Prize money ===
The total prize money for this tournament was US$180,000. The distribution of the prize money was in accordance with BWF regulations.

Event	Winner	Finalist	Semi-finals	Quarter-finals	Last 16
Singles	$13,500	$6,840	$2,610	$1,080	$630
Doubles	$14,220	$6,840	$2,520	$1,305	$675

== Men's singles ==
=== Seeds ===
1. (Malaysia) Lee Zii Jia (second round)
2. (Singapore) Loh Kean Yew (quarter-finals)
3. (Indonesia) Anthony Sinisuka Ginting (withdrew)
4. (Indonesia) Jonatan Christie (withdrew)
5. (India) Lakshya Sen (withdrew)
6. (Thailand) Kunlavut Vitidsarn (withdrew)
7. (India) Srikanth Kidambi (withdrew)
8. (Japan) Kanta Tsuneyama (first round)

=== Wild card ===
Badminton Australia awarded a wild card entry to Nathan Tang.

=== Finals ===
Semi-finals
(China) Lu Guangzu	21	21
(Malaysia) Ng Tze Yong	18	15
(Japan) Kodai Naraoka	16	21	19
(China) Shi Yuqi	21	16	21

Final
(China) Lu Guangzu	19	21	5
(China) Shi Yuqi	21	18	21

=== Top half ===
==== Section 1 ====
First round
1	(Malaysia) Lee Z J	21	21
Q4	(Australia) R Agustino	9	11
(China) Lu GZ	21	21
(Indonesia) T Sugiarto	18	17
PFQ	(Chinese Taipei) Lu C-h	14	12
PFQ	(Indonesia) I Rumbay	21	21
PFQ	(Malaysia) Soong J V	21	21
PFQ	(Australia) A Dolman	12	12

Second round
1	(Malaysia) Lee Z J	22	15	16
(China) Lu GZ	20	21	21
PFQ	(Indonesia) I Rumbay	15	21	21
PFQ	(Malaysia) Soong J V	21	18	12

Quarter-finals
(China) Lu GZ	21	21
PFQ	(Indonesia) I Rumbay	12	9

==== Section 2 ====
First round
PFQ	(Azerbaijan) A R Dwicahyo
Q2	(Australia) J Y Chan	w	/	o
(India) S Verma
WC	(Australia) N Tang	w	/	o
PFQ	(Australia) J Schueler	13	15
(Malaysia) Ng T Y	21	21
Q3	(Australia) P Yan	6	13
(South Korea) Heo K-h	21	21

Second round
Q2	(Australia) J Y Chan	21	17	20
WC	(Australia) N Tang	18	21	22
(Malaysia) Ng T Y	21	19	21
(South Korea) Heo K-h	16	21	5

Quarter-finals
WC	(Australia) N Tang	9	7
(Malaysia) Ng T Y	21	21

=== Bottom half ===
==== Section 3 ====
First round
(Japan) K Watanabe	21	21
(Thailand) S Thammasin	13	13
(Japan) K Nishimoto	21	21
PFQ	(Malaysia) Cheam J W	17	14
(Japan) K Naraoka	21	21
(Indonesia) S H Rhustavito	11	8
Q1	(Australia) E Stephen Sam	4	7
PFQ	(Indonesia) C Adinata	21	21

Second round
(Japan) K Watanabe	21	22
(Japan) K Nishimoto	13	20
(Japan) K Naraoka	21	21
PFQ	(Indonesia) C Adinata	11	16

Quarter-finals
(Japan) K Watanabe	15	21	15
(Japan) K Naraoka	21	16	21

==== Section 4 ====
First round
(China) Weng HY	21	21
PFQ	(New Zealand) R Cheng	11	16
(China) Shi YQ	21	21
8	(Japan) K Tsuneyama	11	18
(China) Li SF	14	21	21
(Indonesia) C A Dwi Wardoyo	21	17	8
PFQ	(Australia) P S Low	10	9
2	(Singapore) Loh K Y	21	21

Second round
(China) Weng HY	14	7
(China) Shi YQ	21	21
(China) Li SF	10	21	21
2	(Singapore) Loh K Y	21	12	23

Quarter-finals
(China) Shi YQ	17	21	21
2	(Singapore) Loh K Y	21	16	13

== Women's singles ==
=== Seeds ===
1. (South Korea) An Se-young (champion)
2. (Thailand) Ratchanok Intanon (withdrew)
3. (Thailand) Pornpawee Chochuwong (semi-finals)
4. (Japan) Nozomi Okuhara (quarter-finals)
5. (Thailand) Busanan Ongbamrungphan (withdrew)
6. (Thailand) Lalinrat Chaiwan (withdrew)
7. (China) Han Yue (semi-finals)
8. (Singapore) Yeo Jia Min (first round)

=== Wild card ===
Badminton Australia awarded a wild card entry to Chen Hsuan-yu.

=== Finals ===
Semi-finals
1	(South Korea) An Se-young	21	21
3	(Thailand) Pornpawee Chochuwong	16	11
7	(China) Han Yue	21	16	14
(Indonesia) Gregoria Mariska Tunjung	18	21	21

Final
1	(South Korea) An Se-young	21	21
(Indonesia) Gregoria Mariska Tunjung	17	9

=== Top half ===
==== Section 1 ====
First round
1	(South Korea) An S-y	21	21
(Chinese Taipei) Sung S-y	14	13
PFQ	(Japan) A Takahashi	21	21
Q2	(Australia) V Tjonadi	4	8
8	(Singapore) Yeo J M	6	12
(Chinese Taipei) Pai Y-p	21	21
PFQ	(Chinese Taipei) Yu C-h	8	21	21
(Chinese Taipei) Hsu W-c	21	19	16

Second round
1	(South Korea) An S-y	21	21
PFQ	(Japan) A Takahashi	15	9
(Chinese Taipei) Pai Y-p	18	21	21
PFQ	(Chinese Taipei) Yu C-h	21	15	19

Quarter-finals
1	(South Korea) An S-y	21	21
(Chinese Taipei) Pai Y-p	10	13

==== Section 2 ====
First round
3	(Thailand) P Chochuwong	21	21
(Malaysia) Kisona S	13	10
Q3	(Australia) V Na	4	4
(Japan) A Ohori	21	21
PFQ	(India) A Gowda	21	21
Q1	(Australia) P E Viravong	9	11
(Malaysia) Goh J W	21	21
(India) T Hemanth	15	16

Second round
3	(Thailand) P Chochuwong	21	21
(Japan) A Ohori	11	15
PFQ	(India) A Gowda	7	13
(Malaysia) Goh J W	21	21

Quarter-finals
3	(Thailand) P Chochuwong	21	21
(Malaysia) Goh J W	11	13

=== Bottom half ===
==== Section 3 ====
First round
WC	(Australia) Chen H-y	21	21
Q4	(Australia) YR Zhang	4	13
(South Korea) Kim G-e	21	20	5
7	(China) Han Y	9	22	21
(Indonesia) P K Wardani	21	21
(Malaysia) S Cheah S Y	19	15
PFQ	(Australia) L Ma	6	13
4	(Japan) N Okuhara	21	21

Second round
WC	(Australia) Chen H-y	6	10
7	(China) Han Y	21	21
(Indonesia) P K Wardani	17	21	17
4	(Japan) N Okuhara	21	16	21

Quarter-finals
7	(China) Han Y	21	21
4	(Japan) N Okuhara	17	10

==== Section 4 ====
First round
(Thailand) S Katethong	21	21
(China) Zhang YM	13	16
(Indonesia) G M Tunjung	21	21
PFQ	(Australia) S Tjonadi	4	6
(Japan) S Kawakami	23	21
(South Korea) Sim Y-j	21	11
PFQ	(Australia) T Ho	21	21
PFQ	(Australia) I Yan	13	11

Second round
(Thailand) S Katethong	15	9
(Indonesia) G M Tunjung	21	21
(Japan) S Kawakami	21	21
PFQ	(Australia) T Ho	13	4

Quarter-finals
(Indonesia) G M Tunjung	14	22	21
(Japan) S Kawakami	21	20	16

== Men's doubles ==
=== Seeds ===
1. (Japan) Takuro Hoki / Yugo Kobayashi (withdrew)
2. (Chinese Taipei) Lee Yang / Wang Chi-lin (quarter-finals)
3. (Indonesia) Mohammad Ahsan / Hendra Setiawan (withdrew)
4. (Indonesia) Fajar Alfian / Muhammad Rian Ardianto (withdrew)
5. (India) Satwiksairaj Rankireddy / Chirag Shetty (withdrew)
6. (Malaysia) Ong Yew Sin / Teo Ee Yi (final)
7. (China) Liang Weikeng / Wang Chang (quarter-finals)
8. (China) Liu Yuchen / Ou Xuanyi (champions)

=== Finals ===
Semi-finals
6	(Malaysia) Ong Yew Sin (Malaysia) Teo Ee Yi	14	21	21
(China) He Jiting (China) Zhou Haodong	21	17	18
(Chinese Taipei) Lee Jhe-huei (Chinese Taipei) Yang Po-hsuan	21	21	22
8	(China) Liu Yuchen (China) Ou Xuanyi	12	23	24

Final
6	(Malaysia) Ong Yew Sin (Malaysia) Teo Ee Yi	16	20
8	(China) Liu Yuchen (China) Ou Xuanyi	21	22

=== Top half ===
==== Section 1 ====
First round
PFQ	(Australia) J Schueler (Australia) N Tang	7	8
(Japan) H Okamura (Japan) M Onodera	21	21
(South Korea) Kang M-h (South Korea) Seo S-j	21	21
(Chinese Taipei) Lu C-y (Chinese Taipei) Yang P-h	16	12
6	(Malaysia) Ong Y S (Malaysia) Teo E Y	21	21
PFQ	(New Zealand) A Jeffrey (New Zealand) D Soedjasa	12	15
Q3
(New Zealand) R Cheng (New Zealand) J Wang	w	/	o

Second round
(Japan) H Okamura (Japan) M Onodera	10	10
(South Korea) Kang M-h (South Korea) Seo S-j	21	21
6	(Malaysia) Ong Y S (Malaysia) Teo E Y	21	21
(New Zealand) R Cheng (New Zealand) J Wang	6	18

Quarter-finals
(South Korea) Kang M-h (South Korea) Seo S-j	21	12
6	(Malaysia) Ong Y S (Malaysia) Teo E Y	23	21

==== Section 2 ====
First round
PFQ	(Australia) B Halim (Australia) B Kwok	12	15
(China) He JT (China) Zhou HD	21	21
(Thailand) N Phuangphuapet (Australia) HD Tang	w	/	o
Q2
7	(China) Liang WK (China) Wang C	21	21
PFQ	(Australia) J Hong (Australia) K Xu	8	7
(Indonesia) S K Gutama (Indonesia) M R P Isfahani	21	22
(Chinese Taipei) Chang K-c (Chinese Taipei) Po L-w	18	20

Second round
(China) He JT (China) Zhou HD	21	21
(Thailand) N Phuangphuapet (Australia) HD Tang	14	14
7	(China) Liang WK (China) Wang C	21	13	21
(Indonesia) S K Gutama (Indonesia) M R P Isfahani	12	21	10

Quarter-finals
(China) He JT (China) Zhou HD	21	16	21
7	(China) Liang WK (China) Wang C	19	21	17

=== Bottom half ===
==== Section 3 ====
First round
(South Korea) Jin Y (South Korea) Kim Y-h	19	21	16
(Chinese Taipei) Lee J-h (Chinese Taipei) Yang P-hs	21	12	21
(Japan) A Koga (Japan) T Saito	21	21
PFQ	(Australia) L Defolky (Australia) R Tam	13	7
Q4
PFQ	(Australia) K Choo (Australia) M C Lim	w	/	o
PFQ	(Australia) A Dolman (Australia) P S Low	10	4
PFQ	(Chinese Taipei) Lee F-c (Chinese Taipei) Lee F-j	21	21

Second round
(Chinese Taipei) Lee J-h (Chinese Taipei) Yang P-hs	21	21
(Japan) A Koga (Japan) T Saito	17	18
PFQ	(Australia) K Choo (Australia) M C Lim	14	11
PFQ	(Chinese Taipei) Lee F-c (Chinese Taipei) Lee F-j	21	21

Quarter-finals
(Chinese Taipei) Lee J-h (Chinese Taipei) Yang P-hs	21	14	21
PFQ	(Chinese Taipei) Lee F-c (Chinese Taipei) Lee F-j	19	21	17

==== Section 4 ====
First round
Q1
(South Korea) Choi S-g (South Korea) Kim W-h	w	/	o
(China) Ren XY (China) Tan Q	18	12
8	(China) Liu YC (China) Ou XY	21	21
PFQ	(Australia) F Kurniawan (Australia) M Lim	3	12
(Japan) K Matsui (Japan) Y Takeuchi	21	21
(Chinese Taipei) Su C-h (Chinese Taipei) Ye H-w	20	17
2	(Chinese Taipei) Lee Y (Chinese Taipei) Wang C-l	22	21

Second round
(South Korea) Choi S-g (South Korea) Kim W-h	21	18	18
8	(China) Liu YC (China) Ou XY	18	21	21
(Japan) K Matsui (Japan) Y Takeuchi	10	9
2	(Chinese Taipei) Lee Y (Chinese Taipei) Wang C-l	21	21

Quarter-finals
8	(China) Liu YC (China) Ou XY	22	25
2	(Chinese Taipei) Lee Y (Chinese Taipei) Wang C-l	20	23

== Women's doubles ==
=== Seeds ===
1. (Japan) Nami Matsuyama / Chiharu Shida (second round)
2. (Japan) Mayu Matsumoto / Wakana Nagahara (quarter-finals)
3. (Japan) Yuki Fukushima / Sayaka Hirota (quarter-finals)
4. (Thailand) Jongkolphan Kititharakul / Rawinda Prajongjai (withdrew)
5. (South Korea) Jeong Na-eun / Kim Hye-jeong (semi-finals)
6. (China) Zhang Shuxian / Zheng Yu (champions)
7. (Japan) Rin Iwanaga / Kie Nakanishi (second round)
8. (South Korea) Baek Ha-na / Lee Yu-lim (withdrew)

=== Finals ===
Semi-finals
(Thailand) Benyapa Aimsaard (Thailand) Nuntakarn Aimsaard	21	21
5	(South Korea) Jeong Na-eun (South Korea) Kim Hye-jeong	19	18
6	(China) Zhang Shuxian (China) Zheng Yu	21	21
(Chinese Taipei) Lee Chia-hsin (Chinese Taipei) Teng Chun-hsun	15	17

Final
(Thailand) Benyapa Aimsaard (Thailand) Nuntakarn Aimsaard	19	13
6	(China) Zhang Shuxian (China) Zheng Yu	21	21

=== Top half ===
==== Section 1 ====
First round
1	(Japan) N Matsuyama (Japan) C Shida	21	17	21
(Chinese Taipei) Hsu Y-c (Chinese Taipei) Lin W-c	18	21	12
(Australia) S Tjonadi (Australia) V Tjonadi	w	/	o
(Indonesia) M Mamahit (Indonesia) T Nadia
8	(South Korea) Baek H-n (South Korea) Lee Y-l
(Canada) R Honderich (Canada) K Tsai	w	/	o
(Thailand) B Aimsaard (Thailand) N Aimsaard	18	21	21
(Australia) Chen H-y (Australia) G Somerville	21	16	12

Second round
1	(Japan) N Matsuyama (Japan) C Shida
(Australia) S Tjonadi (Australia) V Tjonadi	w	/	o
(Canada) R Honderich (Canada) K Tsai	9	12
(Thailand) B Aimsaard (Thailand) N Aimsaard	21	21

Quarter-finals
(Australia) S Tjonadi (Australia) V Tjonadi	6	4
(Thailand) B Aimsaard (Thailand) N Aimsaard	21	21

==== Section 2 ====
First round
4	(Thailand) J Kititharakul (Thailand) R Prajongjai
(Indonesia) F D Kusuma (Indonesia) A C Pratiwi	w	/	o
(Japan) R Hirokami (Japan) Y Kato	10	9
(Japan) R Miyaura (Japan) A Sakuramoto	21	21
5	(South Korea) Jeong N-e (South Korea) Kim H-j	w	/	o
(Japan) S Hobara (Japan) H Suzuki
(Australia) L Ma (Australia) V Ma	10	11
(Indonesia) L T Mayasari (Indonesia) R Sugiarto	21	21

Second round
(Indonesia) F D Kusuma (Indonesia) A C Pratiwi	16	13
(Japan) R Miyaura (Japan) A Sakuramoto	21	21
5	(South Korea) Jeong N-e (South Korea) Kim H-j	21	21
(Indonesia) L T Mayasari (Indonesia) R Sugiarto	14	11

Quarter-finals
(Japan) R Miyaura (Japan) A Sakuramoto	13	16
5	(South Korea) Jeong N-e (South Korea) Kim H-j	21	21

=== Bottom half ===
==== Section 3 ====
First round
(India) S Singhi (India) R Thaker
(Indonesia) M T Puspita Sari (Indonesia) R A Rose	w	/	o
(Chinese Taipei) Sung S-y (Chinese Taipei) Yu C-h	18	12
6	(China) Zhang SX (China) Zheng Y	21	21
(Malaysia) V Hoo (Malaysia) Lim C S
(Australia) M Almazan (Australia) T Ho	w	/	o
(Chinese Taipei) Hu L-f (Chinese Taipei) Lin X-m	14	17
3	(Japan) Y Fukushima (Japan) S Hirota	21	21

Second round
(Indonesia) M T Puspita Sari (Indonesia) R A Rose	14	8
6	(China) Zhang SX (China) Zheng Y	21	21
(Australia) M Almazan (Australia) T Ho	3	3
3	(Japan) Y Fukushima (Japan) S Hirota	21	21

Quarter-finals
6	(China) Zhang SX (China) Zheng Y	14	21	21
3	(Japan) Y Fukushima (Japan) S Hirota	21	10	19

==== Section 4 ====
First round
(Chinese Taipei) Lee C-h (Chinese Taipei) Teng C-h	21	21
(India) R Panda (India) S Panda	16	14
(Australia) C Ho (Australia) YR Zhang	6	7
7	(Japan) R Iwanaga (Japan) K Nakanishi	21	21
(Australia) S Kurniawan (Australia) Poon L Y	16	19
(Singapore) Jin YJ (Singapore) C Wong	21	21
(New Zealand) E Calder-Hawkins (New Zealand) A Pak	8	6
2	(Japan) M Matsumoto (Japan) W Nagahara	21	21

Second round
(Chinese Taipei) Lee C-h (Chinese Taipei) Teng C-h	21	21
7	(Japan) R Iwanaga (Japan) K Nakanishi	15	14
(Singapore) Jin YJ (Singapore) C Wong	15	21	18
2	(Japan) M Matsumoto (Japan) W Nagahara	21	13	21

Quarter-finals
(Chinese Taipei) Lee C-h (Chinese Taipei) Teng C-h	22	21
2	(Japan) M Matsumoto (Japan) W Nagahara	20	18

== Mixed doubles ==
=== Seeds ===
1. (Japan) Yuta Watanabe / Arisa Higashino (withdrew)
2. (Denmark) Mathias Christiansen / Alexandra Bøje (withdrew)
3. (Malaysia) Tan Kian Meng / Lai Pei Jing (withdrew)
4. (South Korea) Seo Seung-jae / Chae Yoo-jung (champions)
5. (Malaysia) Goh Soon Huat / Shevon Jemie Lai (withdrew)
6. (Indonesia) Rinov Rivaldy / Pitha Haningtyas Mentari (withdrew)
7. (Japan) Yuki Kaneko / Misaki Matsutomo (quarter-finals)
8. (China) Feng Yanzhe / Huang Dongping (semi-finals)

=== Wild card ===
Badminton Australia awarded a wild card entry to Lim Ming Chuen / Sylvina Kurniawan.

=== Finals ===
Semi-finals
(South Korea) Kim Won-ho (South Korea) Jeong Na-eun	14	21	21
(Indonesia) Dejan Ferdinansyah (Indonesia) Gloria Emanuelle Widjaja	21	13	8
4	(South Korea) Seo Seung-jae (South Korea) Chae Yoo-jung	22	21
8	(China) Feng Yanzhe (China) Huang Dongping	20	14

Final
(South Korea) Kim Won-ho (South Korea) Jeong Na-eun	9	17
4	(South Korea) Seo Seung-jae (South Korea) Chae Yoo-jung	21	21

=== Top half ===
==== Section 1 ====
First round
PFQ	(Australia) A Ramadiansyah (Australia) M D Nurlia	8	7
(Chinese Taipei) Ye H-w (Chinese Taipei) Lee C-h	21	21
(South Korea) Kim W-h (South Korea) Jeong N-e	21	21
Q1	(Australia) HD Tang (Australia) M Almazan	11	9
PFQ	(New Zealand) A Jeffrey (New Zealand) J Villegas	13	11
(Chinese Taipei) Chang K-c (Chinese Taipei) Lee C-c	21	21
PFQ	(New Zealand) J Wang (New Zealand) E Calder-Hawkins	21	21
PFQ	(Australia) K Xu (Australia) S Tjonadi	7	13

Second round
(Chinese Taipei) Ye H-w (Chinese Taipei) Lee C-h	18	15
(South Korea) Kim W-h (South Korea) Jeong N-e	21	21
(Chinese Taipei) Chang K-c (Chinese Taipei) Lee C-c	21	21
PFQ	(New Zealand) J Wang (New Zealand) E Calder-Hawkins	15	8

Quarter-finals
(South Korea) Kim W-h (South Korea) Jeong N-e	21	21
(Chinese Taipei) Chang K-c (Chinese Taipei) Lee C-c	18	19

==== Section 2 ====
First round
PFQ	(Thailand) N Phuangphuapet (Australia) Poon L Y	13	20
(Indonesia) D Ferdinansyah (Indonesia) G E Widjaja	21	22
(Japan) H Midorikawa (Japan) N Saito	21	19	12
(Chinese Taipei) Yang P-hs (Chinese Taipei) Hu L-f	17	21	21
7	(Japan) Y Kaneko (Japan) M Matsutomo	17	21	21
(Indonesia) A Syahnawi (Indonesia) W O Kandow	21	15	16
(Chinese Taipei) Lee Y (Chinese Taipei) Lin W-c	21	22
(Indonesia) A B Cahyono (Indonesia) M G Islami	10	20

Second round
(Indonesia) D Ferdinansyah (Indonesia) G E Widjaja	21	17	21
(Chinese Taipei) Yang P-hs (Chinese Taipei) Hu L-f	13	21	16
7	(Japan) Y Kaneko (Japan) M Matsutomo	21	19	21
(Chinese Taipei) Lee Y (Chinese Taipei) Lin W-c	18	21	11

Quarter-finals
(Indonesia) D Ferdinansyah (Indonesia) G E Widjaja	20	21	21
7	(Japan) Y Kaneko (Japan) M Matsutomo	22	19	17

=== Bottom half ===
==== Section 3 ====
First round
PFQ	(South Korea) Lee J-s (Australia) C Ho	21	21
Q4	(Australia) B Kwok (Australia) E Kwok	18	19
(Japan) K Yamashita (Japan) N Shinoya	21	21
PFQ	(Australia) K Choo (Australia) G Somerville	15	8
(Chinese Taipei) Lee J-h (Chinese Taipei) Hsu Y-c	10	16
(Singapore) T Hee (Singapore) J Tan	21	21
(New Zealand) D Soedjasa (New Zealand) A Pak	8	10
4	(South Korea) Seo S-j (South Korea) Chae Y-j	21	21

Second round
PFQ	(South Korea) Lee J-s (Australia) C Ho	4	9
(Japan) K Yamashita (Japan) N Shinoya	21	21
(Singapore) T Hee (Singapore) J Tan	21	15	15
4	(South Korea) Seo S-j (South Korea) Chae Y-j	13	21	21

Quarter-finals
(Japan) K Yamashita (Japan) N Shinoya	14	21	8
4	(South Korea) Seo S-j (South Korea) Chae Y-j	21	15	21

==== Section 4 ====
First round
WC	(Australia) Lim M C (Australia) S Kurniawan	20	13
(South Korea) Kim Y-h (South Korea) Lee Y-l	22	21
Q3	(Australia) Goh X H (Australia) P E Viravong	3	4
8	(China) Feng YZ (China) Huang DP	21	21
Q2	(Australia) P S Low (Australia) Y Zhang	15	10
(Indonesia) A Maulana (Indonesia) N V Marwah	21	21
(Japan) Y Nishikawa (Japan) S Ozaki	21	21
PFQ	(Australia) J Hong (Australia) V Tjonadi	3	11

Second round
(South Korea) Kim Y-h (South Korea) Lee Y-l	12	21	15
8	(China) Feng YZ (China) Huang DP	21	14	21
(Indonesia) A Maulana (Indonesia) N V Marwah	21	17	21
(Japan) Y Nishikawa (Japan) S Ozaki	13	21	16

Quarter-finals
8	(China) Feng YZ (China) Huang DP	21	21
(Indonesia) A Maulana (Indonesia) N V Marwah	7	4

Preceded by 2019 Australian Open	Australian Open	Succeeded by 2023 Australian Open
Preceded by 2022 Hylo Open	BWF World Tour; 2022 BWF season	Succeeded by 2022 BWF World Tour Finals
