= Benyapa Aimsaard =

Thai badminton player

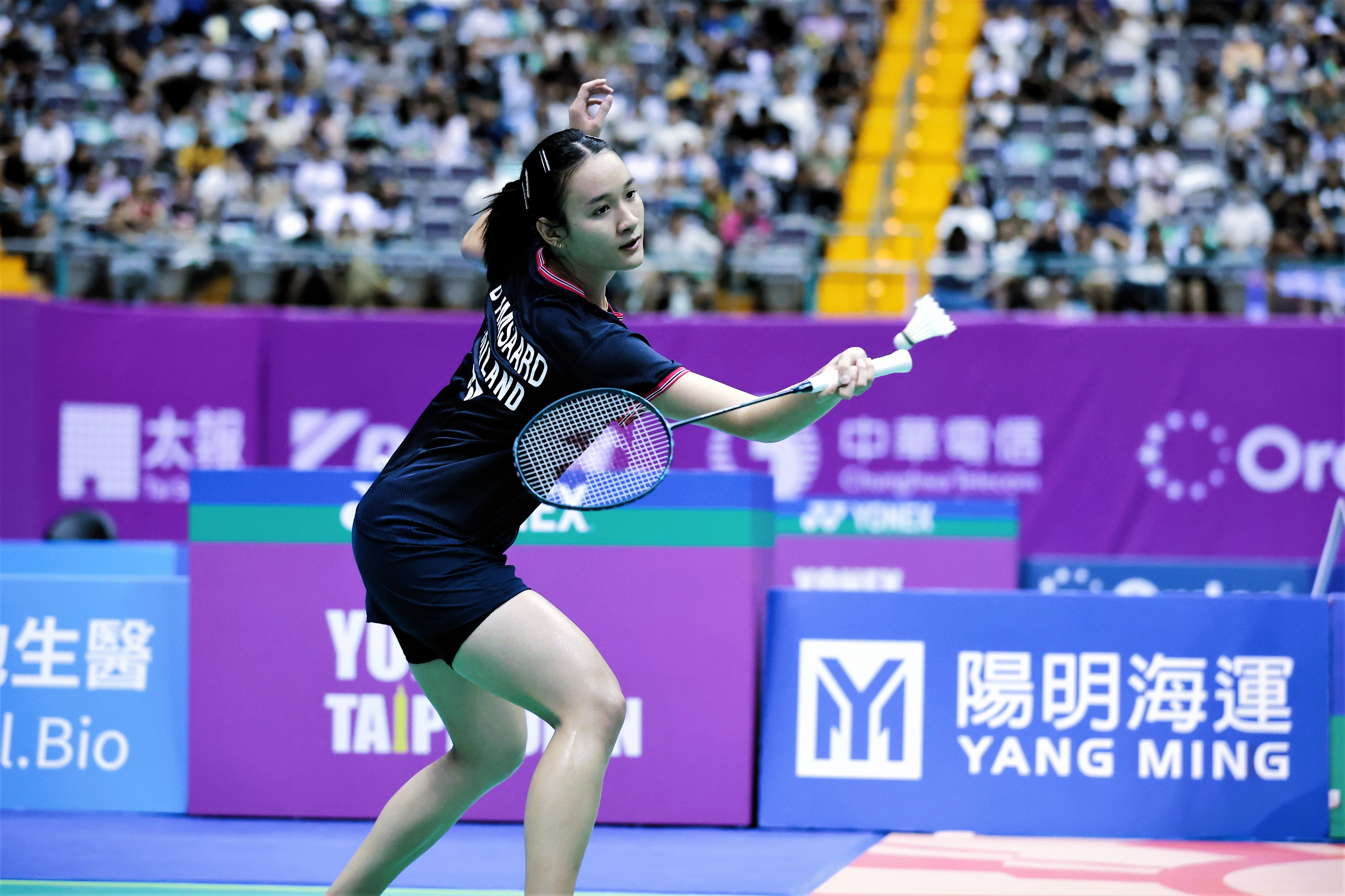
- Aimsaard at the 2024 Taipei Open

Personal information
- Nickname: Muna
- Born: 29 August 2002 (age 24) Bangkok, Thailand
- Height: 1.75 m (5 ft 9 in)

Sport
- Country: Thailand
- Sport: Badminton
- Handedness: Right

Women's singles and doubles
- Highest ranking: 66 (WS 23 March 2021); 9 (WD with Nuntakarn Aimsaard, 3 January 2023); 40 (XD with Phuwanat Horbanluekit, 5 May 2026)
- Current ranking: 38 (WD with Nuntakarn Aimsaard); 74 (XD with Phuwanat Horbanluekit) (3 November 2026)
- BWF profile
Medal record
Women's badminton
Representing Thailand
Uber Cup
Bronze medal – third place	2020 Aarhus	Women's team
Bronze medal – third place	2022 Bangkok	Women's team
Asian Games
Bronze medal – third place	2022 Hangzhou	Women's team
Asia Mixed Team Championships
Bronze medal – third place	2023 Dubai	Mixed team
Bronze medal – third place	2025 Qingdao	Mixed team
Asia Team Championships
Silver medal – second place	2024 Selangor	Women's team
SEA Games
Gold medal – first place	2021 Vietnam	Women's team
Gold medal – first place	2023 Cambodia	Women's team
Gold medal – first place	2025 Thailand	Women's team
Silver medal – second place	2021 Vietnam	Women's doubles
World Junior Championships
Bronze medal – third place	2019 Kazan	Mixed team
Bronze medal – third place	2019 Kazan	Mixed doubles
Asian Junior Championships
Gold medal – first place	2019 Suzhou	Mixed team
Bronze medal – third place	2019 Suzhou	Girls' singles

Benyapa Aimsaard (Thai: เบญญาภา เอี่ยมสอาด; born 29 August 2002) is a Thai badminton player.

== Career ==
Aimsaard educated at the Demonstration School of Bansomdejchaopraya Rajabhat University. She entered the international circuit in 2015, at a very young age of 13. At the Asian U–15 Junior Championships, she finished as mixed doubles runner-up with Setthanan Piyawatcharavijit. At the age of 15, she was able to compete in the senior international tournament, by becoming a finalist in the 2017 Lao International Series. Aimsaard later won the 2018 Asian U–17 Junior Championships in the girls' singles and doubles events. In 2019, she won the Mongolia Junior International in the girls' singles event, India Junior International both in singles and mixed doubles. Aimsaard was part of Thai team that won the first ever mixed team title at the Asian Junior Championships. She also won bronze medal at the Asian Junior Championships in the girls' singles and World Junior Championships in the mixed doubles event. Aimsaard won her first BWF world tour title at the 2022 India Open in the women's doubles event partnered with her sister Nuntakarn Aimsaard.

== Achievements ==
=== SEA Games ===
Women's doubles
Year	Venue	Partner	Opponent	Score	Result
2021	Bac Giang Gymnasium; Bắc Giang, Vietnam	(Thailand) Nuntakarn Aimsaard	(Indonesia) Apriyani Rahayu (Indonesia) Siti Fadia Silva Ramadhanti	17–21, 14–21	Silver

=== World Junior Championships ===
Mixed doubles
Year	Venue	Partner	Opponent	Score	Result
2019	Kazan Gymnastics Center; Kazan, Russia	(Thailand) Ratchapol Makkasasithorn	(China) Feng Yanzhe (China) Lin Fangling	17–21, 14–21	Bronze

=== Asian Junior Championships ===
Girls' singles
Year	Venue	Opponent	Score	Result
2019	Suzhou Olympic Sports Centre, Suzhou, China	(China) Zhou Meng	10–21, 18–21	Bronze

=== BWF World Tour (8 titles, 5 runners-up) ===
The BWF World Tour, which was announced on 19 March 2017 and implemented in 2018, is a series of elite badminton tournaments sanctioned by the Badminton World Federation (BWF). The BWF World Tours are divided into levels of World Tour Finals, Super 1000, Super 750, Super 500, Super 300, and the BWF Tour Super 100.

Women's doubles
Year	Tournament	Level	Partner	Opponent	Score	Result
2022	India Open	Super 500	(Thailand) Nuntakarn Aimsaard	(Russia) Anastasiia Akchurina (Russia) Olga Morozova	21–13, 21–5	(gold) Winner
2022	Korea Open	Super 500	(Thailand) Nuntakarn Aimsaard	(South Korea) Jeong Na-eun (South Korea) Kim Hye-jeong	16–21, 12–21	(silver) Runner-up
2022	Vietnam Open	Super 100	(Thailand) Nuntakarn Aimsaard	(Indonesia) Febriana Dwipuji Kusuma (Indonesia) Amalia Cahaya Pratiwi	21–16, 27–25	(gold) Winner
2022	Hylo Open	Super 300	(Thailand) Nuntakarn Aimsaard	(Thailand) Jongkolphan Kititharakul (Thailand) Rawinda Prajongjai	21–18, 18–21, 21–17	(gold) Winner
2022	Australian Open	Super 300	(Thailand) Nuntakarn Aimsaard	(China) Zhang Shuxian (China) Zheng Yu	19–21, 13–21	(silver) Runner-up
2022	BWF World Tour Finals	World Tour Finals	(Thailand) Nuntakarn Aimsaard	(China) Chen Qingchen (China) Jia Yifan	13–21, 14–21	(silver) Runner-up
2023	Thailand Masters	Super 300	(Thailand) Nuntakarn Aimsaard	(South Korea) Baek Ha-na (South Korea) Lee So-hee	21–6, 21–11	(gold) Winner
2023	Thailand Open	Super 500	(Thailand) Nuntakarn Aimsaard	(South Korea) Kim So-yeong (South Korea) Kong Hee-yong	13–21, 17–21	(silver) Runner-up
2024	Thailand Masters	Super 300	(Thailand) Nuntakarn Aimsaard	(China) Li Yijing (China) Luo Xumin	21–13, 17–21, 27–25	(gold) Winner
2025	U.S. Open	Super 300	(Thailand) Nuntakarn Aimsaard	(Chinese Taipei) Hsu Ya-ching (Chinese Taipei) Sung Yu-hsuan	21–15, 21–15	(gold) Winner
2025	Canada Open	Super 300	(Thailand) Nuntakarn Aimsaard	(Japan) Kaho Osawa (Japan) Mai Tanabe	21–12, 21–18	(gold) Winner
2026	Korea Masters	Super 300	(Thailand) Nuntakarn Aimsaard	(China) Luo Yi (China) Wang Tingge	21–17, 19–21, 14–21	(silver) Runner-up

Mixed doubles
Year	Tournament	Level	Partner	Opponent	Score	Result
2025	Baoji China Masters	Super 100	(Thailand) Ruttanapak Oupthong	(China) Zhu Yijun (China) Li Qian	21–17, 21–16	(gold) Winner

=== BWF International Challenge/Series (3 runners-up) ===
Women's singles
Year	Tournament	Opponent	Score	Result
2017	Lao International	(Vietnam) Nguyễn Thùy Linh	12–21, 21–16, 11–21	(silver) Runner-up
2019	India International	(Thailand) Porntip Buranaprasertsuk	18–21, 11–21	(silver) Runner-up

Mixed doubles
Year	Tournament	Partner	Opponent	Score	Result
2019	Mongolia International	(Thailand) Ratchapol Makkasasithorn	(Hong Kong) Mak Hee Chun (Hong Kong) Chau Hoi Wah	20–22, 15–21	(silver) Runner-up

BWF International Challenge tournament
BWF International Series tournament
BWF Future Series tournament

=== BWF Junior International (3 titles) ===
Girls' singles
Year	Tournament	Opponent	Score	Result
2019	Mongolia Junior International	(Thailand) Pornpicha Choeikeewong	10–21, 21–13, 21–10	(gold) Winner
2019	India Junior International	(Japan) Riko Gunji	21–19, 18–21, 23–21	(gold) Winner

Mixed doubles
Year	Tournament	Partner	Opponent	Score	Result
2019	India Junior International	(Thailand) Ratchapol Makkasasithorn	(India) Ishaan Bhatnagar (India) Tanisha Crasto	21–12, 20–22, 22–20	(gold) Winner

BWF Junior International Grand Prix tournament
BWF Junior International Challenge tournament
BWF Junior International Series tournament
BWF Junior Future Series tournament
