= Nuntakarn Aimsaard =

Thai badminton player

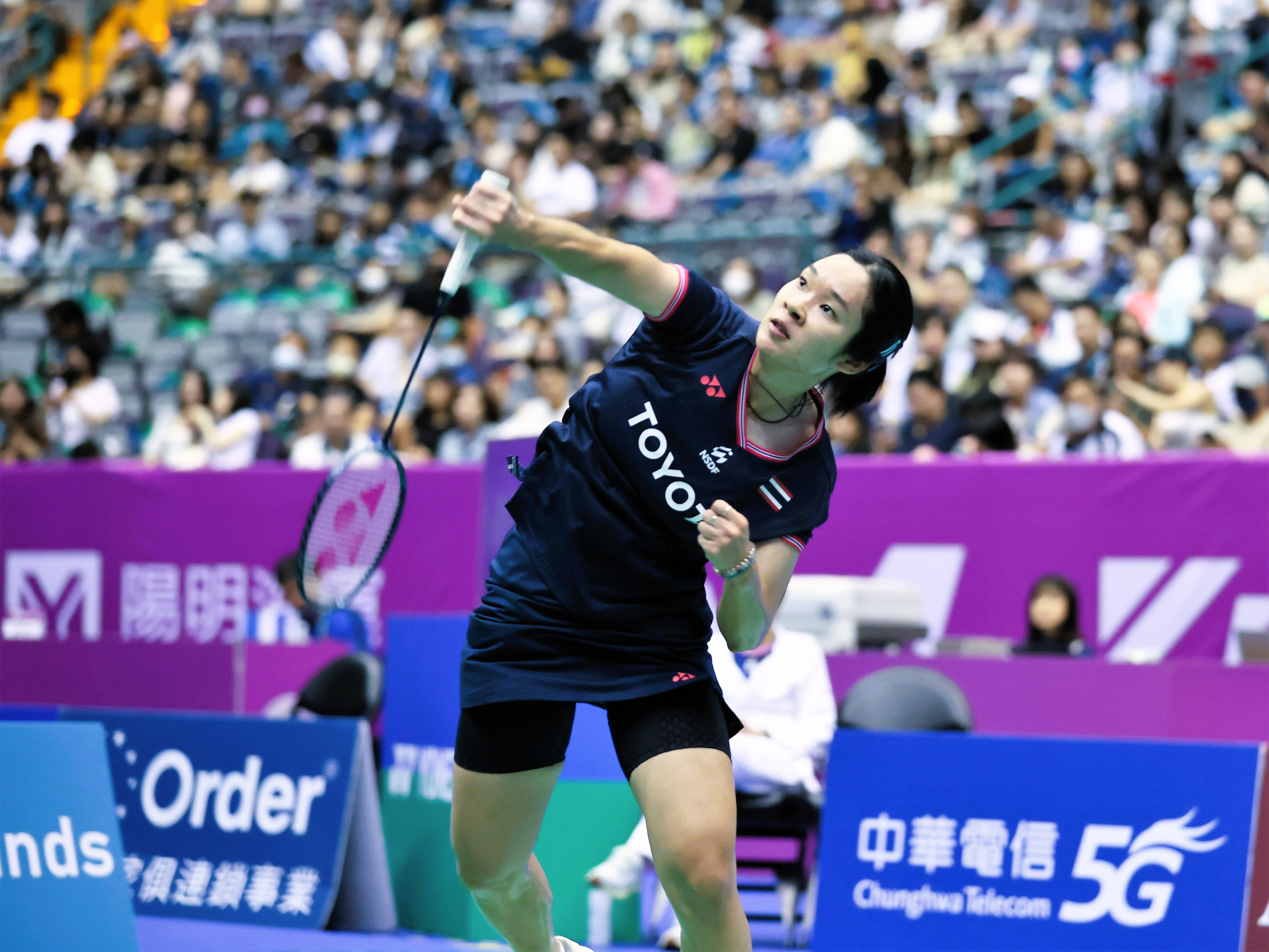
- Aimsaard at the 2024 Taipei Open

Personal information
- Nickname: Auna
- Born: 23 May 1999 (age 27) Bangkok, Thailand
- Height: 1.70 m (5 ft 7 in)

Sport
- Country: Thailand
- Sport: Badminton
- Handedness: Right

Women's doubles
- Highest ranking: 9 (with Benyapa Aimsaard, 3 January 2023)
- Current ranking: 38 (with Benyapa Aimsaard, 3 November 2026)
- BWF profile
Medal record
Women's badminton
Representing Thailand
Uber Cup
Bronze medal – third place	2020 Aarhus	Women's team
Bronze medal – third place	2022 Bangkok	Women's team
Asian Games
Bronze medal – third place	2022 Hangzhou	Women's team
Asia Mixed Team Championships
Bronze medal – third place	2023 Dubai	Mixed team
Bronze medal – third place	2025 Qingdao	Mixed team
Asia Team Championships
Silver medal – second place	2024 Selangor	Women's team
Summer Universiade
Bronze medal – third place	2017 Taipei	Mixed team
SEA Games
Gold medal – first place	2021 Vietnam	Women's team
Gold medal – first place	2023 Cambodia	Women's team
Silver medal – second place	2021 Vietnam	Women's doubles
World Junior Championships
Bronze medal – third place	2016 Bilbao	Mixed team
Asian Junior Championships
Bronze medal – third place	2016 Bangkok	Mixed team

Nuntakarn Aimsaard (Thai: นันทกาญจน์ เอี่ยมสอาด; born 23 May 1999) is a Thai badminton player. Aimsaard entered the international badminton circuit in 2015. She was part of the Thailand team that won the mixed team bronze medal at the 2017 Summer Universiade. She won her first BWF world tour title at the 2022 India Open in the women's doubles event partnered with her sister Benyapa Aimsaard.

== Achievements ==
=== SEA Games ===
Women's doubles
Year	Venue	Partner	Opponent	Score	Result
2021	Bac Giang Gymnasium; Bắc Giang, Vietnam	(Thailand) Benyapa Aimsaard	(Indonesia) Apriyani Rahayu (Indonesia) Siti Fadia Silva Ramadhanti	17–21, 14–21	Silver

=== BWF World Tour (7 titles, 5 runners-up) ===
The BWF World Tour, which was announced on 19 March 2017 and implemented in 2018, is a series of elite badminton tournaments sanctioned by the Badminton World Federation (BWF). The BWF World Tours are divided into levels of World Tour Finals, Super 1000, Super 750, Super 500, Super 300, and the BWF Tour Super 100.

Women's doubles
Year	Tournament	Level	Partner	Opponent	Score	Result
2022	India Open	Super 500	(Thailand) Benyapa Aimsaard	(Russia) Anastasiia Akchurina (Russia) Olga Morozova	21–13, 21–5	(gold) Winner
2022	Korea Open	Super 500	(Thailand) Benyapa Aimsaard	(South Korea) Jeong Na-eun (South Korea) Kim Hye-jeong	16–21, 12–21	(silver) Runner-up
2022	Vietnam Open	Super 100	(Thailand) Benyapa Aimsaard	(Indonesia) Febriana Dwipuji Kusuma (Indonesia) Amalia Cahaya Pratiwi	21–16, 27–25	(gold) Winner
2022	Hylo Open	Super 300	(Thailand) Benyapa Aimsaard	(Thailand) Jongkolphan Kititharakul (Thailand) Rawinda Prajongjai	21–18, 18–21, 21–17	(gold) Winner
2022	Australian Open	Super 300	(Thailand) Benyapa Aimsaard	(China) Zhang Shuxian (China) Zheng Yu	19–21, 13–21	(silver) Runner-up
2022	BWF World Tour Finals	World Tour Finals	(Thailand) Benyapa Aimsaard	(China) Chen Qingchen (China) Jia Yifan	13–21, 14–21	(silver) Runner-up
2023	Thailand Masters	Super 300	(Thailand) Benyapa Aimsaard	(South Korea) Baek Ha-na (South Korea) Lee So-hee	21–6, 21–11	(gold) Winner
2023	Thailand Open	Super 500	(Thailand) Benyapa Aimsaard	(South Korea) Kim So-yeong (South Korea) Kong Hee-yong	13–21, 17–21	(silver) Runner-up
2024	Thailand Masters	Super 300	(Thailand) Benyapa Aimsaard	(China) Li Yijing (China) Luo Xumin	21–13, 17–21, 27–25	(gold) Winner
2025	U.S. Open	Super 300	(Thailand) Benyapa Aimsaard	(Chinese Taipei) Hsu Ya-ching (Chinese Taipei) Sung Yu-hsuan	21–15, 21–15	(gold) Winner
2025	Canada Open	Super 300	(Thailand) Benyapa Aimsaard	(Japan) Kaho Osawa (Japan) Mai Tanabe	21–12, 21–18	(gold) Winner
2026	Korea Masters	Super 300	(Thailand) Benyapa Aimsaard	(China) Luo Yi (China) Wang Tingge	21–17, 19–21, 14–21	(silver) Runner-up
