= Lu Guangzu =

Chinese badminton player (born 1996)

Lu Guangzu 陆光祖
Personal information
- Born: 19 October 1996 (age 30) Xuzhou, Jiangsu, China
- Years active: 2016–present
- Height: 1.78 m (5 ft 10 in)

Sport
- Country: China
- Sport: Badminton
- Handedness: Right

Men's singles
- Career record: 155 wins, 108 losses
- Highest ranking: 10 (17 January 2023)
- Current ranking: 34 (27 October 2026)
- BWF profile
Medal record
Men's badminton
Representing China
Sudirman Cup
Gold medal – first place	2021 Vantaa	Mixed team
Gold medal – first place	2023 Suzhou	Mixed team
Thomas Cup
Gold medal – first place	2024 Chengdu	Men's team
Gold medal – first place	2026 Horsens	Men's team
Silver medal – second place	2020 Aarhus	Men's team
Asian Games
Gold medal – first place	2022 Hangzhou	Men's team
Silver medal – second place	2026 Aichi–Nagoya	Men's team
Asian Championships
Silver medal – second place	2025 Ningbo	Men's singles
Bronze medal – third place	2023 Dubai	Men's singles
Asia Mixed Team Championships
Gold medal – first place	2019 Hong Kong	Mixed team
Asia Team Championships
Gold medal – first place	2024 Selangor	Men's team
Silver medal – second place	2018 Alor Setar	Men's team

Lu Guangzu (Chinese: 陆光祖; pinyin: Lù Guāngzǔ; born on 19 October 1996) is a Chinese badminton player. He was a silver medalist in the 2025 Asian Championships. Lu was integrated to China winning team in the 2021 and 2023 Sudirman Cup, as well at the 2024 Thomas Cup. In 2018, Lu made into his first final at the Lingshui China Masters. Since then, he both won Australian Open and Canada Open's titles.

== Career ==
Lu reached the final of the Australian Open, his first final in four years, defeating world number 2 Lee Zii Jia en route. Although he lost to compatriot Shi Yuqi in three games, he qualified for the World Tour Finals for the first time in his career. In his group, he defeated Prannoy H. S. in a tight three-game match, but failed to qualify for the semi-finals as he lost to world No.1 Viktor Axelsen and Kodai Naraoka, both in straight games.

In 2025, he reached the final in the Asian Championships held in Ningbo, but was defeated by Kunlavut Vitidsarn.

== Achievements ==
=== Asian Championships ===
Men's singles
Year	Venue	Opponent	Score	Result	Ref.
2023	Sheikh Rashid Bin Hamdan Indoor Hall; Dubai, United Arab Emirates	(Singapore) Loh Kean Yew	19–21, 15–21	Bronze	
2025	Ningbo Olympic Sports Center Gymnasium; Ningbo, China	(Thailand) Kunlavut Vitidsarn	12–21, 6–11 ret.	Silver	

=== BWF World Tour (3 titles, 5 runners-up) ===
The BWF World Tour, which was announced on 19 March 2017 and implemented in 2018, is a series of elite badminton tournaments sanctioned by the Badminton World Federation (BWF). The BWF World Tour is divided into levels of World Tour Finals, Super 1000, Super 750, Super 500, Super 300, and the BWF Tour Super 100.

Men's singles
Year	Tournament	Level	Opponent	Score	Result	Ref.
2018	Syed Modi International	Super 300	(India) Sameer Verma	21–16, 19–21, 14–21	(silver) Runner-up	
2018	Canada Open	Super 100	(Japan) Minoru Koga	21–15, 21–10	(gold) Winner	
2018	Australian Open	Super 300	(China) Zhou Zeqi	21–8, 23–21	(gold) Winner	
2018	Lingshui China Masters	Super 100	(Chinese Taipei) Lin Yu-hsien	21–12, 12–21, 14–21	(silver) Runner-up	
2022	Australian Open	Super 300	(China) Shi Yuqi	19–21, 21–18, 5–21	(silver) Runner-up	
2023	China Open	Super 1000	(Denmark) Viktor Axelsen	16–21, 19–21	(silver) Runner-up	
2024	Korea Open	Super 500	(Chinese Taipei) Lee Chia-hao	21–16, 20–22, 21–18	(gold) Winner	
2025	Singapore Open	Super 750	(Thailand) Kunlavut Vitidsarn	6–21, 10–21	(silver) Runner-up	
