= Ou Xuanyi =

Chinese badminton player (born 1994)

Ou Xuanyi 歐烜屹
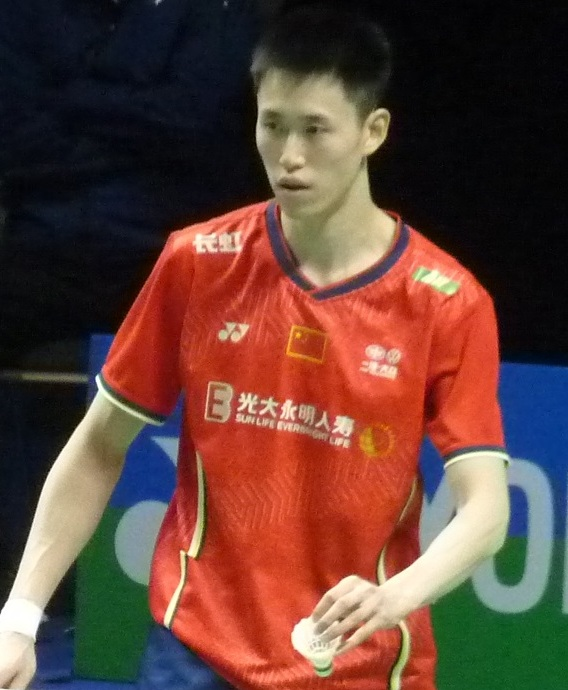
- Ou at the 2022 German Open

Personal information
- Born: 23 January 1994 (age 32) Fujian, China
- Years active: 2013–2024
- Height: 1.89 m (6 ft 2 in)

Sport
- Country: China
- Sport: Badminton
- Handedness: Right
- Retired: 20 August 2024

Men's & mixed doubles
- Highest ranking: 2 (MD with Liu Yuchen, 30 May 2023); 16 (MD with Ren Xiangyu, 19 April 2019); 23 (XD with Feng Xueying, 17 September 2019)
- BWF profile
Medal record
Men's badminton
Representing China
Sudirman Cup
Gold medal – first place	2023 Suzhou	Mixed team
Thomas Cup
Gold medal – first place	2024 Chengdu	Men's team
Asian Games
Gold medal – first place	2022 Hangzhou	Men's team
Asia Mixed Team Championships
Gold medal – first place	2019 Hong Kong	Mixed team

Ou Xuanyi (Chinese: 歐烜屹; pinyin: Ōu Xǔanyì; born 23 January 1994) is a Chinese badminton player. He was part of China winning team in the 2019 Asia Mixed Team Championships, 2022 Asian Games, 2023 Sudirman Cup, and at the 2024 Thomas Cup. He has won eight World Tour titles, and reached a career high as World number 2 in the men's doubles on 30 May 2023.

== Career summary ==
Ou made his debut in an international tournament by competing at the 2013 China Masters. In 2017, he clinched his first international title by winning the mixed doubles title at the Indonesia International Series tournament partnered with Liu Lin.

Ou started the 2018 season by competing at the Lingshui China Masters, and finished as the semi-finalist in the mixed doubles event partnered with Chen Lu. He then won the men's doubles title at the U.S. Open teamed up with Ren Xiangyu, and also the runner-up at the Singapore Open. Together with Feng Xueying, he won the mixed doubles title at the Syed Modi International, which is a Super 300 BWF tournament.

From 2022, Ou started a new partnership with the reigning Olympic silver medalist Liu Yuchen. In the Indonesia Open, the duo beat Korea's Choi Sol-gyu and Kim Won-ho to become the first men’s doubles pair from the reserves’ list to win a Super 1000 title. They qualified to compete at the World Tour Finals and emerged victorious after beating Mohammad Ahsan and Hendra Setiawan in the final. As a result he broke into the top ten for the first time in his career.

In 2023, Ou and Liu helped the national team reach the final of the Sudirman Cup. Facing former world no.1 pair Takuro Hoki and Yugo Kobayashi in the semi-finals while Japan was leading the tie 2–1, Ou and Liu saved four match points being 16–20 down and converting their first to keep China alive in the tie. They eventually got into the final. Ou said after the match, "During the third game after the interval, I rushed a bit and all my shots went long. When we were match point down, I was calm as we were sure to lose the game. Liu Yu Chen just told me to play my game." Compatriot and world no.1 Jia Yifan said after she won the deciding rubber, "We wouldn’t be here if not for the men’s doubles, they did a great job." Ultimately, the Chinese national team went on to win the 2023 Sudirman Cup.

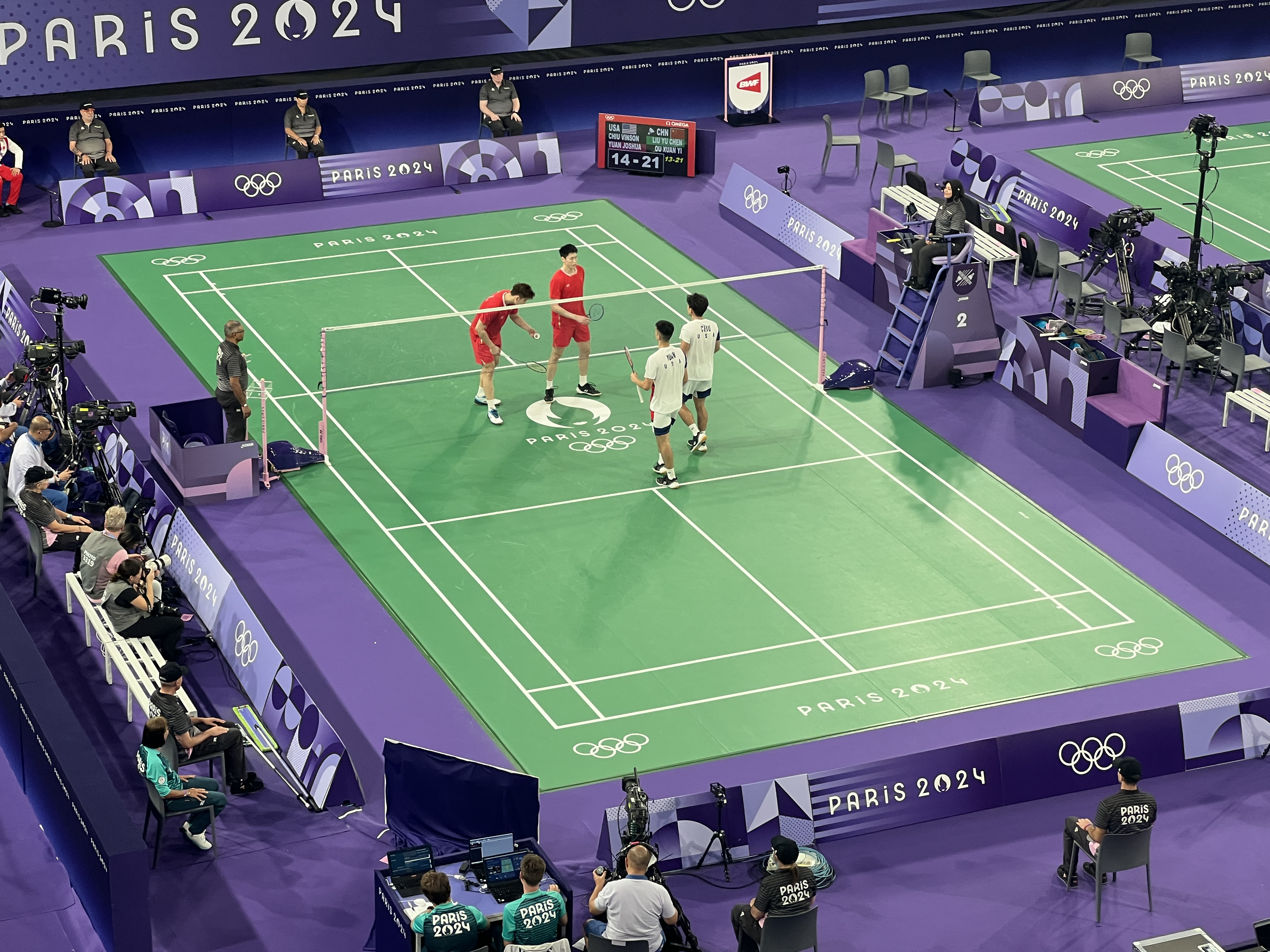
Ou (top right) with his partner Liu Yuchen after won the match against American pair Vinson Chiu and Joshua Yuan in the 2024 Summer Olympics.

In 2024, Ou helps the national team won the 2024 Thomas Cup. In the BWF World Tour, Ou and his partner Liu did not win a single title, their best achievement were a semi-finalist at the Indonesia Masters. Based on the BWF Race to Paris rankings, Ou with his partner qualified to compete in the 2024 Summer Olympics. In his debut at the Olympics, Ou and Liu won two matches and lost two matches in the men's doubles group D, thus being eliminated in the group stage. China men's doubles coach, Chen Qiqiu confirmed that Ou has submitted an application for retirement from the national team on 19 August 2024, and one day later, he officially retired from international badminton.

== Achievements ==
=== BWF World Tour (8 titles, 7 runners-up) ===
The BWF World Tour, which was announced on 19 March 2017 and implemented in 2018, is a series of elite badminton tournaments, sanctioned by Badminton World Federation (BWF). The BWF World Tour is divided into six levels, namely World Tour Finals, Super 1000, Super 750, Super 500, Super 300, and the BWF Tour Super 100.

Men's doubles
Year	Tournament	Level	Partner	Opponent	Score	Result
2018	U.S. Open	Super 300	(China) Ren Xiangyu	(South Korea) Kang Min-hyuk (South Korea) Kim Won-ho	16–21, 21–16, 21–17	(gold) Winner
2018	Singapore Open	Super 500	(China) Ren Xiangyu	(Indonesia) Mohammad Ahsan (Indonesia) Hendra Setiawan	13–21, 19–21	(silver) Runner-up
2019	Lingshui China Masters	Super 100	(China) Ren Xiangyu	(Chinese Taipei) Lee Jhe-huei (Chinese Taipei) Yang Po-hsuan	17–21, 16–21	(silver) Runner-up
2019	Akita Masters	Super 100	(China) Zhang Nan	(Japan) Akira Koga (Japan) Taichi Saito	21–14, 21–19	(gold) Winner
2019	Indonesia Masters	Super 100	(China) Zhang Nan	(Japan) Akira Koga (Japan) Taichi Saito	11–21, 21–10, 22–20	(gold) Winner
2022	German Open	Super 300	(China) Liu Yuchen	(Malaysia) Goh Sze Fei (Malaysia) Nur Izzuddin	21–23, 21–16, 14–21	(silver) Runner-up
2022	Korea Masters	Super 300	(China) Liu Yuchen	(South Korea) Kim Gi-jung (South Korea) Kim Sa-rang	14–21, 16–21	(silver) Runner-up
2022	Indonesia Open	Super 1000	(China) Liu Yuchen	(South Korea) Choi Sol-gyu (South Korea) Kim Won-ho	21–17, 23–21	(gold) Winner
2022	Australian Open	Super 300	(China) Liu Yuchen	(Malaysia) Ong Yew Sin (Malaysia) Teo Ee Yi	21–16, 22–20	(gold) Winner
2022	BWF World Tour Finals	World Tour Finals	(China) Liu Yuchen	(Indonesia) Mohammad Ahsan (Indonesia) Hendra Setiawan	21–17, 19–21, 21–12	(gold) Winner
2023	Hylo Open	Super 300	(China) Liu Yuchen	(Chinese Taipei) Lee Yang (Chinese Taipei) Wang Chi-lin	24–22, 21–13	(gold) Winner
2023	Japan Masters	Super 500	(China) Liu Yuchen	(China) He Jiting (China) Ren Xiangyu	14–21, 21–15, 15–21	(silver) Runner-up

Mixed doubles
Year	Tournament	Level	Partner	Opponent	Score	Result
2018	Syed Modi International	Super 300	(China) Feng Xueying	(Indonesia) Rinov Rivaldy (Indonesia) Pitha Haningtyas Mentari	22–20, 21–10	(gold) Winner
2022	German Open	Super 300	(China) Huang Yaqiong	(Thailand) Dechapol Puavaranukroh (Thailand) Sapsiree Taerattanachai	11–21, 9–21	(silver) Runner-up
2022	Korea Masters	Super 300	(China) Huang Yaqiong	(China) Wang Yilyu (China) Huang Dongping	17–21, 17–21	(silver) Runner-up

=== BWF International Challenge/Series (2 titles) ===
Men's doubles
Year	Tournament	Partner	Opponent	Score	Result
2019	Belarus International	(China) Zhang Nan	(England) Matthew Clare (England) Max Flynn	21–15, 21–15	(gold) Winner

Mixed doubles
Year	Tournament	Partner	Opponent	Score	Result
2017	Indonesia International	(China) Liu Lin	(Indonesia) Lukhi Apri Nugroho (Indonesia) Ririn Amelia	22–20, 21–11	(gold) Winner

BWF International Challenge tournament
BWF International Series tournament
BWF Future Series tournament
