= 2023 Korea Masters =

Badminton tournament in Korea

Tournament details
- Dates: 7–12 November
- Edition: 15th
- Level: Super 300
- Total prize money: US$210,000
- Venue: Gwangju Women’s University Stadium
- Location: Gwangju, South Korea

Champions
- Men's singles: (Japan) Kento Momota
- Women's singles: (South Korea) Kim Ga-eun
- Men's doubles: (Chinese Taipei) Lee Jhe-huei (Chinese Taipei) Yang Po-hsuan
- Women's doubles: (South Korea) Jeong Na-eun (South Korea) Kim Hye-jeong
- Mixed doubles: (South Korea) Seo Seung-jae (South Korea) Chae Yoo-jung

The 2023 Korea Masters was a badminton tournament that took place at Gwangju Women's University Stadium in Gwangju, South Korea, from 7 to 12 November 2023 and had a total prize of $210,000.

== Tournament ==
The 2023 Korea Masters was the thirty-first tournament of the 2023 BWF World Tour and was also part of the Korea Masters championships, which have been held since 2007. This tournament was organized by the Badminton Korea Association with sanction from the BWF.

=== Venue ===
This international tournament was held at Gwangju Women's University Stadium in Gwangju, South Korea.

=== Point distribution ===
Below is the point distribution table for each phase of the tournament based on the BWF points system for the BWF World Tour Super 300 event.

Winner	Runner-up	3/4	5/8	9/16	17/32	33/64	65/128
7,000	5,950	4,900	3,850	2,750	1,670	660	320

=== Prize pool ===
The total prize money is US$210,000 with the distribution of the prize money in accordance with BWF regulations.

Event	Winner	Finalist	Semi-finals	Quarter-finals	Last 16
Singles	$15,700	$7,980	$3,045	$1,260	$735
Doubles	$16,590	$7,980	$2,940	$1,522.5	$787.5

== Men's singles ==
=== Seeds ===
1. (Chinese Taipei) Chou Tien-chen (First round)
2. (Malaysia) Lee Zii Jia (withdrew)
3. (Malaysia) Ng Tze Yong (withdrew)
4. (Chinese Taipei) Lin Chun-yi (Quarter-finals)
5. (Chinese Taipei) Wang Tzu-wei (Semi-finals)
6. (Canada) Brian Yang (withdrew)
7. (Japan) Koki Watanabe (Final)
8. (Chinese Taipei) Su Li-yang (First round)

=== Finals ===
Semi-finals
5	(Chinese Taipei) Wang Tzu-wei	15	14
7	(Japan) Koki Watanabe	21	21
(China) Lei Lanxi	10	19
(Japan) Kento Momota	21	21

Final
7	(Japan) Koki Watanabe	16	15
(Japan) Kento Momota	21	21

=== Top half ===
==== Section 1 ====
First round
1	(Chinese Taipei) Chou T-c	19	14
(Chinese Taipei) Liao J-f	21	21
(Japan) K Takahashi	21	14	15
(Czech Republic) J Louda	17	21	21
5	(Chinese Taipei) Wang T-w	21	21
(Chinese Taipei) Lee C-h	18	11
(Indonesia) S H Rhustavito	21	16	21
(Japan) Y Tanaka	11	21	17

Second round
(Chinese Taipei) Liao J-f	21	21
(Czech Republic) J Louda	11	19
5	(Chinese Taipei) Wang T-w	21	21
(Indonesia) S H Rhustavito	16	12

Quarter-finals
(Chinese Taipei) Liao J-f	13	23	18
5	(Chinese Taipei) Wang T-w	21	21	21

==== Section 2 ====
First round
4	(Chinese Taipei) Lin C-y	21	21
(Spain) P Abián	8	14
(Chinese Taipei) Chi Y-j	16	11
Q2	(South Korea) Jeong M-s	21	21
7	(Japan) K Watanabe	17	21	21
Q1	(Indonesia) A Farhan	21	13	15
(Chinese Taipei) Huang Y-k	14	13
(Japan) T Obayashi	21	21

Second round
4	(Chinese Taipei) Lin C-y	21	21
Q2	(South Korea) Jeong M-s	12	16
7	(Japan) K Watanabe	21	12	21
(Japan) T Obayashi	14	21	9

Quarter-finals
4	(Chinese Taipei) Lin C-y	11	19
7	(Japan) K Watanabe	21	21

=== Bottom half ===
==== Section 3 ====
First round
(China) Lei LX	21	19	21
Q4	(South Korea) Kim D-h	16	21	14
(Azerbaijan) A R Dwicahyo	16	18
PFQ	(Japan) R Hatano	21	21
Q3	(South Korea) Son W-h	9	9
(Finland) K Koljonen	21	21
(Malaysia) Leong J H	13	21	23
PFQ	(Singapore) J Teh	21	9	21

Second round
(China) Lei LX	21	21
PFQ	(Japan) R Hatano	13	12
(Finland) K Koljonen	16	0^{r}
(Malaysia) Leong J H	21	3

Quarter-finals
(China) Lei LX	21	22
(Malaysia) Leong J H	14	20

==== Section 4 ====
First round
PFQ	(Kazakhstan) D Panarin	18	24	16
(Malaysia) Soong J V	21	22	21
(South Korea) Jeon H-j	15	21	24
8	(Chinese Taipei) Su L-y	21	11	22
(Germany) K Schäfer	14	21	21
(Spain) L E Peñalver	21	15	8
(Japan) K Momota	21	21
PFQ	(Chinese Taipei) Wang P-w	10	12

Second round
(Malaysia) Soong J V	7	21	21
(South Korea) Jeon H-j	21	14	17
(Germany) K Schäfer	17	16
(Japan) K Momota	21	21

Quarter-finals
(Malaysia) Soong J V	16	11
(Japan) K Momota	21	21

== Women's singles ==
=== Seeds ===
1. (South Korea) Kim Ga-eun (Champion)
2. (Thailand) Supanida Katethong (First round)
3. (Chinese Taipei) Hsu Wen-chi (Quarter-finals)
4. (Chinese Taipei) Pai Yu-po (First round)
5. (Vietnam) Nguyễn Thùy Linh (Second round)
6. (Indonesia) Putri Kusuma Wardani (First round)
7. (Japan) Natsuki Nidaira (Quarter-finals)
8. (Japan) Saena Kawakami (withdrew)

=== Finals ===
Semi-finals
1	(South Korea) Kim Ga-eun	21	21
(Japan) Asuka Takahashi	16	7
(Indonesia) Ester Nurumi Tri Wardoyo	14	21	12
PFQ	(Japan) Tomoka Miyazaki	21	15	21

Final
1	(South Korea) Kim Ga-eun	19	21	21
PFQ	(Japan) Tomoka Miyazaki	21	17	12

=== Top half ===
==== Section 1 ====
First round
1	(South Korea) Kim G-e	21	21
Q4	(Chinese Taipei) Lee Y-h	13	10
(Chinese Taipei) Lin H-t	23	21
(Thailand) L Chaiwan	21	11
5	(Vietnam) Nguyễn T L	21	21
(Chinese Taipei) Huang C-p	10	17
(Japan) M Suizu	21	21
Q1	(South Korea) Lee S-y	11	15

Second round
1	(South Korea) Kim G-e	21	21
(Chinese Taipei) Lin H-t	16	15
5	(Vietnam) Nguyễn T L	19	22
(Japan) M Suizu	21	24

Quarter-finals
1	(South Korea) Kim G-e	21	21
(Japan) M Suizu	11	14

==== Section 2 ====
First round
3	(Chinese Taipei) Hsu W-c	21	21
(Chinese Taipei) Huang Y-h	19	19
Q2	(South Korea) Kim J-e	21	21
(Hungary) V Sándorházi	11	10
PFQ	(Czech Republic) T Švábíková	23	24	21
(Israel) K Polikarpova	25	22	17
(Japan) A Takahashi	21	21
(United States) L Lam	10	15

Second round
3	(Chinese Taipei) Hsu W-c	21	18	22
Q2	(South Korea) Kim J-e	13	21	20
PFQ	(Czech Republic) T Švábíková	14	9
(Japan) A Takahashi	21	21

Quarter-finals
3	(Chinese Taipei) Hsu W-c	20	22
(Japan) A Takahashi	22	24

=== Bottom half ===
==== Section 3 ====
First round
(Chinese Taipei) Liang T-y	12	21	17
PFQ	(Chinese Taipei) Lin S-y	21	11	21
(Indonesia) E N T Wardoyo	21	19	26
6	(Indonesia) P K Wardani	13	21	24
(Indonesia) K A C Dewi	21	21
(Azerbaijan) K F Azzahra	16	8
(Thailand) P Choeikeewong	21	21
4	(Chinese Taipei) Pai Y-p	8	14

Second round
PFQ	(Chinese Taipei) Lin S-y	15	13
(Indonesia) E N T Wardoyo	21	21
(Indonesia) K A C Dewi	10	17
(Thailand) P Choeikeewong	21	21

Quarter-finals
(Indonesia) E N T Wardoyo	21	21
(Thailand) P Choeikeewong	19	19

==== Section 4 ====
First round
(India) T Hemanth	15	10
Q3	(South Korea) Kim G-r	21	21
(Thailand) P Opatniputh	21	0^{r}
7	(Japan) N Nidaira	23	0
PFQ	(Japan) T Miyazaki	21	21
PFQ	(Mexico) S Solis	4	13
(South Korea) Sim Y-j	21	10	21
2	(Thailand) S Katethong	19	21	16

Second round
Q3	(South Korea) Kim G-r	7	19
7	(Japan) N Nidaira	21	21
PFQ	(Japan) T Miyazaki	9	21	21
(South Korea) Sim Y-j	21	19	11

Quarter-finals
7	(Japan) N Nidaira	5	22	17
PFQ	(Japan) T Miyazaki	21	20	21

== Men's doubles ==
=== Seeds ===
1. (South Korea) Kang Min-hyuk / Seo Seung-jae (Semi-finals)
2. (Chinese Taipei) Lee Yang / Wang Chi-lin (Final)
3. (Chinese Taipei) Lee Jhe-huei / Yang Po-hsuan (Champions)
4. (Chinese Taipei) Lee Fang-chih / Lee Fang-jen (Semi-finals)
5. (Malaysia) Goh Sze Fei / Nur Izzuddin (Quarter-finals)
6. (Chinese Taipei) Chang Ko-chi / Po Li-wei (Quarter-finals)
7. (Japan) Kenya Mitsuhashi / Hiroki Okamura (Quarter-finals)
8. (Japan) Ayato Endo / Yuta Takei (Quarter-finals)

=== Finals ===
Semi-finals
1	(South Korea) Kang Min-hyuk (South Korea) Seo Seung-jae	19	18
3	(Chinese Taipei) Lee Jhe-huei (Chinese Taipei) Yang Po-hsuan	21	21
4	(Chinese Taipei) Lee Fang-chih (Chinese Taipei) Lee Fang-jen	17	6
2	(Chinese Taipei) Lee Yang (Chinese Taipei) Wang Chi-lin	21	21

Final
3	(Chinese Taipei) Lee Jhe-huei (Chinese Taipei) Yang Po-hsuan	21	21
2	(Chinese Taipei) Lee Yang (Chinese Taipei) Wang Chi-lin	17	19

=== Top half ===
==== Section 1 ====
First round
1	(South Korea) Kang M-h (South Korea) Seo S-j	21	21
PFQ	(Chinese Taipei) Chen C-k (Chinese Taipei) Chen S-f	10	16
(Malaysia) N M Azriyn A (Malaysia) Tan W K	21	21
Q2	(Japan) T Aizawa (Japan) Y Noda	11	12
5	(Malaysia) Goh S F (Malaysia) N Izzuddin	21	17	21
Q3	(South Korea) Choi H-g (South Korea) Kim J-h	8	21	12
(Chinese Taipei) Chiu H-c (Chinese Taipei) Yang M-t	10	21	21
PFQ	(Chinese Taipei) Chiang C-w (Chinese Taipei) Wu H-y	21	17	18

Second round
1	(South Korea) Kang M-h (South Korea) Seo S-j	21	21
(Malaysia) N M Azriyn A (Malaysia) Tan W K	18	9
5	(Malaysia) Goh S F (Malaysia) N Izzuddin	21	21
(Chinese Taipei) Chiu H-c (Chinese Taipei) Yang M-t	14	18

Quarter-finals
1	(South Korea) Kang M-h (South Korea) Seo S-j	21	21
5	(Malaysia) Goh S F (Malaysia) N Izzuddin	18	10

==== Section 2 ====
First round
3	(Chinese Taipei) Lee J-h (Chinese Taipei) Yang P-h	21	21
(Malaysia) Lwi S H (Malaysia) J Wong	8	11
(Indonesia) R Hidayat (Indonesia) K S Sukamuljo	21	17
(South Korea) Jin Y (South Korea) Ki D-j	18	11^{r}
6	(Chinese Taipei) Chang K-c (Chinese Taipei) Po L-w	21	17	21
(Thailand) P Kaosamaang (Thailand) W Thongsa-Nga	15	21	14
(United States) V Chiu (United States) J Yuan	16	12
(Chinese Taipei) Wei C-w (Chinese Taipei) Wu G-x	21	21

Second round
3	(Chinese Taipei) Lee J-h (Chinese Taipei) Yang P-h	14	23	21
(Indonesia) R Hidayat (Indonesia) K S Sukamuljo	21	21	16
6	(Chinese Taipei) Chang K-c (Chinese Taipei) Po L-w	21	21
(Chinese Taipei) Wei C-w (Chinese Taipei) Wu G-x	15	19

Quarter-finals
3	(Chinese Taipei) Lee J-h (Chinese Taipei) Yang P-h	16	21	21
6	(Chinese Taipei) Chang K-c (Chinese Taipei) Po L-w	21	12	14

=== Bottom half ===
==== Section 3 ====
First round
(Chinese Taipei) Lin Y-c (Chinese Taipei) Su L-w	21	21
Q4	(South Korea) Cho S-h (South Korea) Na G-m	19	14
(Chinese Taipei) Chen Z-r (Chinese Taipei) Lu C	13	14
7	(Japan) K Mitsuhashi (Japan) H Okamura	21	21
(Malaysia) J Arif (Malaysia) Yap R K	21	16	21
(Chinese Taipei) Lu M-c (Chinese Taipei) Tang K-w	14	21	23
(Malaysia) Low H Y (Malaysia) Ng E C	14	14
4	(Chinese Taipei) Lee F-c (Chinese Taipei) Lee F-j	21	21

Second round
(Chinese Taipei) Lin Y-c (Chinese Taipei) Su L-w	17	21	16
7	(Japan) K Mitsuhashi (Japan) H Okamura	21	19	21
(Chinese Taipei) Lu M-c (Chinese Taipei) Tang K-w	21	11	19
4	(Chinese Taipei) Lee F-c (Chinese Taipei) Lee F-j	17	21	21

Quarter-finals
7	(Japan) K Mitsuhashi (Japan) H Okamura	12	18
4	(Chinese Taipei) Lee F-c (Chinese Taipei) Lee F-j	21	21

==== Section 4 ====
First round
(Japan) K Kumagai (Japan) K Ogawa	20	16
Q1	(Japan) Y Okimoto (Japan) D Tanioka	22	21
(United States) Chen Z-y (United States) P Smith	18	14
8	(Japan) A Endo (Japan) Y Takei	21	21
(Japan) S Mezaki (Japan) H Nishida	17	11
(South Korea) Kim Y-h (South Korea) Wang C	21	21
(Malaysia) Boon X Y (Malaysia) Wong T C	12	16
2	(Chinese Taipei) Lee Y (Chinese Taipei) Wang C-l	21	21

Second round
Q1	(Japan) Y Okimoto (Japan) D Tanioka	17	21	21
8	(Japan) A Endo (Japan) Y Takei	21	19	23
(South Korea) Kim Y-h (South Korea) Wang C	19	13
2	(Chinese Taipei) Lee Y (Chinese Taipei) Wang C-l	21	21

Quarter-finals
8	(Japan) A Endo (Japan) Y Takei	16	30	11
2	(Chinese Taipei) Lee Y (Chinese Taipei) Wang C-l	21	29	21

== Women's doubles ==
=== Seeds ===
1. (South Korea) Baek Ha-na / Lee So-hee (withdrew)
2. (South Korea) Jeong Na-eun / Kim Hye-jeong (Champions)
3. (Chinese Taipei) Hsu Ya-ching / Lin Wan-ching (Second round)
4. (South Korea) Lee Yu-lim / Shin Seung-chan (Second round)
5. (Japan) Rui Hirokami / Yuna Kato (Final)
6. (China) Keng Shuliang / Zhang Chi (First round)
7. (Chinese Taipei) Chang Ching-hui / Yang Ching-tun (Second round)
8. (Chinese Taipei) Hsieh Pei-shan / Tseng Yu-chi (First round)

=== Finals ===
Semi-finals
5	(Japan) Rui Hirokami (Japan) Yuna Kato	21	22	21
(Chinese Taipei) Hsu Yin-hui (Chinese Taipei) Lin Jhih-yun	23	20	17
(Japan) Sayaka Hobara (Japan) Yui Suizu	21	19	16
2	(South Korea) Jeong Na-eun (South Korea) Kim Hye-jeong	12	21	21

Final
5	(Japan) Rui Hirokami (Japan) Yuna Kato	12	19
2	(South Korea) Jeong Na-eun (South Korea) Kim Hye-jeong	21	21

=== Top half ===
==== Section 1 ====
First round
(South Korea) Kim A-y (South Korea) Kim S-j	w	/	o
(South Korea) Kim H-r (South Korea) Lee J-h
5	(Japan) R Hirokami (Japan) Y Kato	21	21
(Chinese Taipei) Hung E-t (Chinese Taipei) Lin Y-p	16	8
(Chinese Taipei) Cheng Y-p (Chinese Taipei) Sun W-p	11	21	6
(Chinese Taipei) Hu L-f (Chinese Taipei) Lin X-m	21	13	21

Second round
1	(South Korea) Baek H-n (South Korea) Lee S-h
(South Korea) Kim A-y (South Korea) Kim S-j	w	/	o
5	(Japan) R Hirokami (Japan) Y Kato	21	21
(Chinese Taipei) Hu L-f (Chinese Taipei) Lin X-m	17	11

Quarter-finals
(South Korea) Kim A-y (South Korea) Kim S-j	11	17
5	(Japan) R Hirokami (Japan) Y Kato	21	21

==== Section 2 ====
First round
(Chinese Taipei) N G Chan (Chinese Taipei) Yang C-y	21	21
(Japan) M Sudo (Japan) N Yamakita	19	19
6	(China) Keng SL (China) Zhang C	12	14
(Chinese Taipei) Lin C-c (Chinese Taipei) Sung Y-h	21	21
(Chinese Taipei) Hsu Y-h (Chinese Taipei) Lin J-y	21	11	22
(South Korea) Kim B-r (South Korea) Kim M-j	14	21	20

Second round
3	(Chinese Taipei) Hsu Y-c (Chinese Taipei) Lin W-c	20	8^{r}
(Chinese Taipei) N G Chan (Chinese Taipei) Yang C-y	22	11
(Chinese Taipei) Lin C-c (Chinese Taipei) Sung Y-h	18	17
(Chinese Taipei) Hsu Y-h (Chinese Taipei) Lin J-y	21	21

Quarter-finals
(Chinese Taipei) N G Chan (Chinese Taipei) Yang C-y	15	21
(Chinese Taipei) Hsu Y-h (Chinese Taipei) Lin J-y	21	23

=== Bottom half ===
==== Section 3 ====
First round
(Hong Kong) Lui L L (Hong Kong) Ng W Y	14	12
(Japan) M Shigeta (Japan) M Taguchi	21	21
(South Korea) Kim Y-j (South Korea) Lee Y-w	20	21	21
8	(Chinese Taipei) Hsieh P-s (Chinese Taipei) Tseng Y-c	22	14	9
(Japan) M Kurashima (Japan) H Osawa	21	10	12
(Japan) S Hobara (Japan) Y Suizu	16	21	21

Second round
(Japan) M Shigeta (Japan) M Taguchi	12	15
(South Korea) Kim Y-j (South Korea) Lee Y-w	21	21
(Japan) S Hobara (Japan) Y Suizu	21	21
4	(South Korea) Lee Y-l (South Korea) Shin S-c	16	19

Quarter-finals
(South Korea) Kim Y-j (South Korea) Lee Y-w	14	21	20
(Japan) S Hobara (Japan) Y Suizu	21	16	22

==== Section 4 ====
First round
(South Korea) Jang M-y (South Korea) Kim M-s	21	16	18
(United States) F Corbett (United States) A Lee	12	21	21
(United States) P L Cao Hok (United States) L Lam	21	16	11
7	(Chinese Taipei) Chang C-h (Chinese Taipei) Yang C-t	18	21	21
(Chinese Taipei) Wang S-m (Chinese Taipei) Wu M-c	10	11
(South Korea) Seong S-y (South Korea) Yoon M-a	21	21

Second round
(United States) F Corbett (United States) A Lee	21	21
7	(Chinese Taipei) Chang C-h (Chinese Taipei) Yang C-t	18	19
(South Korea) Seong S-y (South Korea) Yoon M-a	9	18
2	(South Korea) Jeong N-e (South Korea) Kim H-j	21	21

Quarter-finals
(United States) F Corbett (United States) A Lee	6	12
2	(South Korea) Jeong N-e (South Korea) Kim H-j	21	21

== Mixed doubles ==
=== Seeds ===
1. (South Korea) Seo Seung-jae / Chae Yoo-jung (Champions)
2. (China) Jiang Zhenbang / Wei Yaxin (Final)
3. (South Korea) Kim Won-ho / Jeong Na-eun (Quarter-finals)
4. (Malaysia) Chen Tang Jie / Toh Ee Wei (Semi-finals)
5. (Malaysia) Goh Soon Huat / Shevon Jemie Lai (Semi-finals)
6. (Malaysia) Tan Kian Meng / Lai Pei Jing (Quarter-finals)
7. (China) Cheng Xing / Chen Fanghui (withdrew)
8. (Chinese Taipei) Chang Ko-chi / Lee Chih-chen (First round)

=== Finals ===
Semi-finals
1	(South Korea) Seo Seung-jae (South Korea) Chae Yoo-jung	21	21
4	(Malaysia) Chen Tang Jie (Malaysia) Toh Ee Wei	14	17
5	(Malaysia) Goh Soon Huat (Malaysia) Shevon Jemie Lai	19	15
2	(China) Jiang Zhenbang (China) Wei Yaxin	21	21

Final
1	(South Korea) Seo Seung-jae (South Korea) Chae Yoo-jung	21	21
2	(China) Jiang Zhenbang (China) Wei Yaxin	14	15

=== Top half ===
==== Section 1 ====
First round
1	(South Korea) Seo S-j (South Korea) Chae Y-j	21	21
Q1	(South Korea) Choi H-b (South Korea) Yoon M-a	17	11
(Chinese Taipei) Wei C-w (Chinese Taipei) N G Chan	19	19
(Indonesia) A Maulana (Indonesia) N V Marwah	21	21
PFQ	(Japan) Y Eto (Japan) A Kamiyama	13	11
(South Korea) Kim Y-h (South Korea) Lee Y-l	21	21
(Malaysia) Chan P S (Malaysia) Cheah Y S	11	14
(Chinese Taipei) Yang P-h (Chinese Taipei) Hu L-f	21	21

Second round
1	(South Korea) Seo S-j (South Korea) Chae Y-j	21	21
(Indonesia) A Maulana (Indonesia) N V Marwah	15	17
(South Korea) Kim Y-h (South Korea) Lee Y-l	21	17	21
(Chinese Taipei) Yang P-h (Chinese Taipei) Hu L-f	16	21	5

Quarter-finals
1	(South Korea) Seo S-j (South Korea) Chae Y-j	21	21
(South Korea) Kim Y-h (South Korea) Lee Y-l	13	19

==== Section 2 ====
First round
4	(Malaysia) Chen T J (Malaysia) Toh E W	21	21
(Chinese Taipei) Chen Z-r (Chinese Taipei) Yang C-t	9	6
(South Korea) Wang C (South Korea) Shin S-c	21	15
(Malaysia) Hoo P R (Malaysia) Cheng S Y	23	21
8	(Chinese Taipei) Chang K-c (Chinese Taipei) Lee C-c	14	17
(Chinese Taipei) Chiu H-c (Chinese Taipei) Lin X-m	21	21
(Chinese Taipei) Chen C-k (Chinese Taipei) Hsu Y-h	17	22	21
(Chinese Taipei) Lin B-w (Chinese Taipei) Lin C-c	21	20	15

Second round
4	(Malaysia) Chen T J (Malaysia) Toh E W	21	21
(Malaysia) Hoo P R (Malaysia) Cheng S Y	9	8
(Chinese Taipei) Chiu H-c (Chinese Taipei) Lin X-m	21	21
(Chinese Taipei) Chen C-k (Chinese Taipei) Hsu Y-h	19	14

Quarter-finals
4	(Malaysia) Chen T J (Malaysia) Toh E W	21	21
(Chinese Taipei) Chiu H-c (Chinese Taipei) Lin X-m	19	17

=== Bottom half ===
==== Section 3 ====
First round
Q3	(South Korea) An Y-s (South Korea) Lee Y-w	21	21
Q4	(Chinese Taipei) Su L-w (Chinese Taipei) Sun W-p	15	14
Q2	(Japan) H Shimono (Japan) M Shigeta	8	12
5	(Malaysia) Goh S H (Malaysia) S J Lai	21	21
(Chinese Taipei) Lee J-h (Chinese Taipei) Hsu Y-c	14	10
(Malaysia) Yap R K (Malaysia) V Siow	21	21
(Japan) H Nishi (Japan) A Sato	19	11
3	(South Korea) Kim W-h (South Korea) Jeong N-e	21	21

Second round
Q3	(South Korea) An Y-s (South Korea) Lee Y-w	11	13
5	(Malaysia) Goh S H (Malaysia) S J Lai	21	21
(Malaysia) Yap R K (Malaysia) V Siow	11	12
3	(South Korea) Kim W-h (South Korea) Jeong N-e	21	21

Quarter-finals
5	(Malaysia) Goh S H (Malaysia) S J Lai	16	22	22
3	(South Korea) Kim W-h (South Korea) Jeong N-e	21	20	20

==== Section 4 ====
First round
(United States) V Chiu (United States) J Gai	14	21	17
(Chinese Taipei) Wu H-y (Chinese Taipei) Yang C-y	21	19	21
PFQ	(Chinese Taipei) Lu C (Chinese Taipei) Cheng Y-p	15	10
6	(Malaysia) Tan K M (Malaysia) Lai P J	21	21
(Chinese Taipei) Lu M-c (Chinese Taipei) Hung E-t	12	21	13
(Thailand) R Oupthong (Thailand) J Sudjaipraparat	21	16	21
(United States) P Smith (United States) A Lee	11	12
2	(China) Jiang ZB (China) Wei YX	21	21

Second round
(Chinese Taipei) Wu H-y (Chinese Taipei) Yang C-y	20	21	18
6	(Malaysia) Tan K M (Malaysia) Lai P J	22	18	21
(Thailand) R Oupthong (Thailand) J Sudjaipraparat	21	18	15
2	(China) Jiang ZB (China) Wei YX	16	21	21

Quarter-finals
6	(Malaysia) Tan K M (Malaysia) Lai P J	19	9
2	(China) Jiang ZB (China) Wei YX	21	21

Preceded by 2023 Hylo Open; 2023 Malaysia Super 100	BWF World Tour; 2023 BWF season	Succeeded by 2023 Japan Masters
