= 2022 Indonesia Masters Super 100 =

Tournament details
- Dates: 18–23 October
- Edition: 3rd
- Level: Super 100
- Total prize money: US$81,000
- Venue: Platinum Sports Hall
- Location: Malang, Indonesia

Champions
- Men's singles: (Malaysia) Leong Jun Hao
- Women's singles: (China) Gao Fangjie
- Men's doubles: (Indonesia) Rahmat Hidayat (Indonesia) Pramudya Kusumawardana
- Women's doubles: (Japan) Rui Hirokami (Japan) Yuna Kato
- Mixed doubles: (China) Jiang Zhenbang (China) Wei Yaxin

The 2022 Indonesia Masters Super 100 (officially known as the KB Financial Group Indonesia Masters 2022 for sponsorship reasons) was a badminton tournament which took place at Platinum Sports Hall in Malang, Indonesia, from 18 to 23 October 2022 and had a total purse of $81,000.

== Tournament ==
The 2022 Indonesia Masters Super 100 was the fifth and final Super 100 tournament of the 2022 BWF World Tour and also part of the Indonesia Masters Super 100 championships, which had been held since 2018. This tournament was organized by the Badminton Association of Indonesia and sanctioned by the BWF.

=== Venue ===
This international tournament was held at Platinum Sports Hall in Malang, East Java, Indonesia.

=== Point distribution ===
Below is the point distribution table for each phase of the tournament based on the BWF points system for the BWF Tour Super 100 event.

Winner	Runner-up	3/4	5/8	9/16	17/32	33/64	65/128	129/256
5,500	4,680	3,850	3,030	2,110	1,290	510	240	100

=== Prize pool ===
The total prize money was US$81,000 with the distribution of the prize money in accordance with BWF regulations.

Event	Winner	Finalist	Semi-finals	Quarter-finals	Last 16
Singles	$6,075	$3,078	$1,174.5	$486	$283.5
Doubles	$6,399	$3,078	$1,134	$587.25	$303.75

== Men's singles ==
=== Seeds ===
1. (Malaysia) Ng Tze Yong (quarter-finals)
2. (Japan) Koki Watanabe (third round)
3. (India) Parupalli Kashyap (withdrew)
4. (China) Weng Hongyang (quarter-finals)
5. (South Korea) Son Wan-ho (semi-finals)
6. (Malaysia) Soong Joo Ven (withdrew)
7. (Malaysia) Cheam June Wei (final)
8. (India) Subhankar Dey (second round)

=== Finals ===
Semi-finals
7	(Malaysia) Cheam June Wei	21	21
(Chinese Taipei) Lee Chia-hao	7	3
5	(South Korea) Son Wan-ho	18	21	13
(Malaysia) Leong Jun Hao	21	18	21

Final
7	(Malaysia) Cheam June Wei	21	20	19
(Malaysia) Leong Jun Hao	9	22	21

=== Top half ===
==== Section 1 ====
First round
(Indonesia) S P Belawa	10	21	10
(China) Sun FX	21	15	21
(Malaysia) S Shaqeem	21	21
(Indonesia) H Kho Wibowo	14	9
(Malaysia) Lee S Y	20	14
(Indonesia) I Rumbay	22	21
(Singapore) J Teh	21	21
PFQ	(South Korea) Lee Y-g	13	14

Second round
1	(Malaysia) Ng T Y	15	21	21
(China) Sun FX	21	14	16
(India) A Mishra	11	11
(Malaysia) S Shaqeem	21	21
7	(Malaysia) Cheam J W	22	21
(Indonesia) I Rumbay	20	19
Q4	(South Korea) Jung M-s	21	20	21
(Singapore) J Teh	18	22	15

Third round
1	(Malaysia) Ng T Y	21	21
(Malaysia) S Shaqeem	16	13
7	(Malaysia) Cheam J W	21	13	21
Q4	(South Korea) Jung M-s	13	21	16

Quarter-finals
1	(Malaysia) Ng T Y	21	13	19
7	(Malaysia) Cheam J W	16	21	21

==== Section 2 ====
First round
(Chinese Taipei) Lee C-h	21	20	21
Q2	(China) Liu L	16	22	19
(China) Lei LX	21	21
(India) S P Singh	12	11
(Malaysia) S Aidil	15	17
(Indonesia) C Adinata	21	21
(Malaysia) Ong K Y	21	19	21
(Malaysia) E Vasigaran	11	21	15

Second round
PFQ	(India) D Rawat	9	10
(Chinese Taipei) Lee C-h	21	21
Q7	(South Korea) Kim J-w	12	16
(China) Lei LX	21	21
PFQ	(Indonesia) Y S Marcellyno	19	13
(Indonesia) C Adinata	21	21
(South Korea) Jeon H-j	21	21
(Malaysia) Ong K Y	12	11

Third round
(Chinese Taipei) Lee C-h	21	9	22
(China) Lei LX	11	21	20
(Indonesia) C Adinata	23	21
(South Korea) Jeon H-j	21	18

Quarter-finals
(Chinese Taipei) Lee C-h	16	21	21
(Indonesia) C Adinata	21	17	17

=== Bottom half ===
==== Section 3 ====
First round
(Indonesia) P A Maulana	21	20	26
(India) A Yadav	16	22	24
Q3	(South Korea) Park S-y	12	21	21
(United States) M S Alcala	21	13	12
Q5	(Indonesia) I D Syahputra	21	21
(Indonesia) S Tegar	16	13
PFQ	(Indonesia) M S N Mayang	13	17
Q6	(China) Wang ZX	21	21

Second round
(Indonesia) P A Maulana	13	11
(Indonesia) K A Nugraha	21	21
Q3	(South Korea) Park S-y	16	15
5	(South Korea) Son W-h	21	21
Q5	(Indonesia) I D Syahputra	16	21	21
(Malaysia) Lim C K	21	12	19
Q6	(China) Wang ZX	15	17
4	(China) Weng HY	21	21

Third round
(Indonesia) K A Nugraha	11	21	9
5	(South Korea) Son W-h	21	15	21
Q5	(Indonesia) I D Syahputra	9	16
4	(China) Weng HY	21	21

Quarter-finals
5	(South Korea) Son W-h	21	21
4	(China) Weng HY	18	19

==== Section 4 ====
First round
(Malaysia) Kok J H	12	17
Q1	(South Korea) Cho G-y	21	21
(Indonesia) B Setiabudi	21	21
(India) Aman F S	13	13
(Chinese Taipei) Chi Y-j	21	19	10
Q8	(Indonesia) A W Chairullah	12	21	21
(South Korea) Kim D-h	21	21
(Indonesia) Y Ramlie	11	12

Second round
Q1	(South Korea) Cho G-y	21	24
(India) M L Maisnam	16	22
(Indonesia) B Setiabudi	21	21
8	(India) S Dey	10	18
Q8	(Indonesia) A W Chairullah	19	16
(Malaysia) Leong J H	21	21
(South Korea) Kim D-h	11	10
2	(Japan) K Watanabe	21	21

Third round
Q1	(South Korea) Cho G-y	21	21
(Indonesia) B Setiabudi	17	17
(Malaysia) Leong J H	21	15	21
2	(Japan) K Watanabe	17	21	18

Quarter-finals
Q1	(South Korea) Cho G-y	21	15	7
(Malaysia) Leong J H	12	21	21

== Women's singles ==
=== Seeds ===
1. (Japan) Saena Kawakami (quarter-finals)
2. (Indonesia) Putri Kusuma Wardani (second round)
3. (South Korea) Sim Yu-jin (second round)
4. (Indonesia) Ruselli Hartawan (quarter-finals)
5. (Malaysia) Kisona Selvaduray (quarter-finals)
6. (Malaysia) Soniia Cheah Su Ya (first round)
7. (Malaysia) Goh Jin Wei (first round)
8. (Canada) Wenyu Zhang (first round)

=== Finals ===
Semi-finals
(Japan) Riko Gunji	21	21
(Indonesia) Komang Ayu Cahya Dewi	14	14
(Japan) Natsuki Nidaira	17	20
Q4	(China) Gao Fangjie	21	22

Final
(Japan) Riko Gunji	10	12
Q4	(China) Gao Fangjie	21	21

=== Top half ===
==== Section 1 ====
First round
1	(Japan) S Kawakami	21	21
Q1	(South Korea) Park M-j	12	15
PFQ	(Indonesia) B Prasista	21	13	21
(Malaysia) Myisha M K	15	21	14
7	(Malaysia) Goh J W	21	17	16
(Japan) R Gunji	10	21	21
(Indonesia) Fitriani	21	21
(Indonesia) A S Fatetani	19	15

Second round
1	(Japan) S Kawakami	21	0
PFQ	(Indonesia) B Prasista	15	0^{r}
(Japan) R Gunji	21	21
(Indonesia) Fitriani	18	16

Quarter-finals
1	(Japan) S Kawakami	21	20	9
(Japan) R Gunji	8	22	21

==== Section 2 ====
First round
4	(Indonesia) R Hartawan	21	21
(India) K Mopati	6	1
(Indonesia) S Widjaja	19	13
(Indonesia) S Fatmawati	21	21
8	(Canada) WY Zhang	9	14
(Indonesia) K A C Dewi	21	21
(India) P Neeluri	8	7
(South Korea) Jeon J-i	21	21

Second round
4	(Indonesia) R Hartawan	21	21	21
(Indonesia) S Fatmawati	15	23	17
(Indonesia) K A C Dewi	21	21
(South Korea) Jeon J-i	16	9

Quarter-finals
4	(Indonesia) R Hartawan	15	13
(Indonesia) K A C Dewi	21	21

=== Bottom half ===
==== Section 3 ====
First round
(South Korea) Lee S-y	18	21	21
(India) Gadde R S	21	15	17
(Japan) A Takahashi	21	7
6	(Malaysia) S Cheah S Y	10	1^{r}
(Indonesia) Y Y Susanto	15	15
(Japan) N Nidaira	21	21
Q3	(China) Chen L	21	17	9
3	(South Korea) Sim Y-j	13	21	21

Second round
(South Korea) Lee S-y	16	14
(Japan) A Takahashi	21	21
(Japan) N Nidaira	21	21
3	(South Korea) Sim Y-j	18	11

Quarter-finals
(Japan) A Takahashi	18	21	14
(Japan) N Nidaira	21	14	21

==== Section 4 ====
First round
Q2	(South Korea) Kim J-e	10	21	11
(India) Samiya I F	21	15	21
(Canada) R Chan	3	15
5	(Malaysia) Kisona S	21	21
Q4	(China) Gao FJ	21	21
(Myanmar) Thet Htar T	10	4
(India) S K P Kudaravalli	12	16
2	(Indonesia) P K Wardani	21	21

Second round
(India) Samiya I F	10	17
5	(Malaysia) Kisona S	21	21
Q4	(China) Gao FJ	21	21
2	(Indonesia) P K Wardani	12	11

Quarter-finals
5	(Malaysia) Kisona S	4	10
Q4	(China) Gao FJ	21	21

== Men's doubles ==
=== Seeds ===
1. (China) He Jiting / Zhou Haodong (final)
2. (Malaysia) Junaidi Arif / Muhammad Haikal (quarter-finals)
3. (Japan) Hiroki Okamura / Masayuki Onodera (semi-finals)
4. (China) Ren Xiangyu / Tan Qiang (semi-finals)
5. (Indonesia) Rahmat Hidayat / Pramudya Kusumawardana (champions)
6. (Japan) Takuto Inoue / Kenya Mitsuhashi (quarter-finals)
7. (Malaysia) Boon Xin Yuan / Wong Tien Ci (second round)
8. (Indonesia) Panjer Aji Siloka Dadiara / Bryan Sidney Elohim (first round)

=== Finals ===
Semi-finals
1	(China) He Jiting (China) Zhou Haodong	23	21
4	(China) Ren Xiangyu (China) Tan Qiang	21	19
3	(Japan) Hiroki Okamura (Japan) Masayuki Onodera	18	14
5	(Indonesia) Rahmat Hidayat (Indonesia) Pramudya Kusumawardana	21	21

Final
1	(China) He Jiting (China) Zhou Haodong	18	19
5	(Indonesia) Rahmat Hidayat (Indonesia) Pramudya Kusumawardana	21	21

=== Top half ===
==== Section 1 ====
First round
1	(China) He JT (China) Zhou HD	21	21
(Japan) S Mezaki (Japan) H Nishida	15	15
Q2	(Indonesia) R K Suwardi (Indonesia) E R Purnomo	18	19
(Japan) M Takano (Japan) K Tamate	21	21
7	(Malaysia) Boon X Y (Malaysia) Wong T C	21	14	21
(Malaysia) Lee Y B (Malaysia) Ling W J	13	21	17
(South Korea) Na G-m (South Korea) Noh J-s	17	15
(Indonesia) A E Prasetya (Indonesia) A Y Santoso	21	21

Second round
1	(China) He JT (China) Zhou HD	21	21
(Japan) M Takano (Japan) K Tamate	9	14
7	(Malaysia) Boon X Y (Malaysia) Wong T C	20	23	23
(Indonesia) A E Prasetya (Indonesia) A Y Santoso	22	21	25

Quarter-finals
1	(China) He JT (China) Zhou HD	21	21
(Indonesia) A E Prasetya (Indonesia) A Y Santoso	16	14

==== Section 2 ====
First round
4	(China) Ren XY (China) Tan Q	21	21
(Chinese Taipei) Huang Y-r (Chinese Taipei) Lin S-k	9	8
(Chinese Taipei) Wei C-w (Chinese Taipei) Wu G-x	21	21
Q4	(Indonesia) H Faizal (Malaysia) Lau Y S	18	19
8	(Indonesia) P A S Dadiara (Indonesia) B S Elohim	18	15
(Indonesia) G A Prihardika (Indonesia) F M Ranialdy	21	21
(Chinese Taipei) Lin Y-c (Chinese Taipei) Su L-w	21	21
(India) T Kona (India) S Sharma	13	6

Second round
4	(China) Ren XY (China) Tan Q	18	21	21
(Chinese Taipei) Wei C-w (Chinese Taipei) Wu G-x	21	16	7
(Indonesia) G A Prihardika (Indonesia) F M Ranialdy	12	21	16
(Chinese Taipei) Lin Y-c (Chinese Taipei) Su L-w	21	17	21

Quarter-finals
4	(China) Ren XY (China) Tan Q	21	21
(Chinese Taipei) Lin Y-c (Chinese Taipei) Su L-w	13	11

=== Bottom half ===
==== Section 3 ====
First round
(Malaysia) Chang Y J (Malaysia) Yap R K	21	15	17
(Malaysia) Chia W J (Malaysia) Low H Y	16	21	21
Q3	(China) Chen BY (China) Liu Y	15	13
6	(Japan) T Inoue (Japan) K Mitsuhashi	21	21
(South Korea) Kim J-h (South Korea) Yoon D-i	15	18
(Chinese Taipei) Chen C-k (Chinese Taipei) Chen S-f	21	21
(Indonesia) G Dwi Putra (Indonesia) G C W Wijaya	23	19
3	(Japan) H Okamura (Japan) M Onodera	25	21

Second round
(Malaysia) Chia W J (Malaysia) Low H Y	21	14	19
6	(Japan) T Inoue (Japan) K Mitsuhashi	19	21	21
(Chinese Taipei) Chen C-k (Chinese Taipei) Chen S-f	17	18
3	(Japan) H Okamura (Japan) M Onodera	21	21

Quarter-finals
6	(Japan) T Inoue (Japan) K Mitsuhashi	19	21	19
3	(Japan) H Okamura (Japan) M Onodera	21	19	21

==== Section 4 ====
First round
(South Korea) Kim H-t (South Korea) Na S-s	21	15	21
(Malaysia) Goh V S (Malaysia) Lim K W	19	21	15
(Indonesia) A B Cahyono (Indonesia) R A Wicaksono	22	15
5	(Indonesia) R Hidayat (Indonesia) P Kusumawardana	24	21
(Indonesia) R Dhanriano (Indonesia) K A Haryanto	22	21
(Indonesia) T S C Hutomo (Indonesia) C D Wijaya	20	15
Q1	(China) Cui HC (China) Sun WJ	18	16
2	(Malaysia) J Arif (Malaysia) M Haikal	21	21

Second round
(South Korea) Kim H-t (South Korea) Na S-s	19	18
5	(Indonesia) R Hidayat (Indonesia) P Kusumawardana	21	21
(Indonesia) R Dhanriano (Indonesia) K A Haryanto	21	16	18
2	(Malaysia) J Arif (Malaysia) M Haikal	18	21	21

Quarter-finals
5	(Indonesia) R Hidayat (Indonesia) P Kusumawardana	21	21
2	(Malaysia) J Arif (Malaysia) M Haikal	13	14

== Women's doubles ==
=== Seeds ===
1. (Japan) Rui Hirokami / Yuna Kato (champions)
2. (Thailand) Pichamon Phatcharaphisutsin / Nannapas Sukklad (second round)
3. (South Korea) Kim Min-ji / Seong Seung-yeon (semi-finals)
4. (Japan) Sayaka Hobara / Hinata Suzuki (quarter-finals)
5. (Japan) Rena Miyaura / Ayako Sakuramoto (final)
6. (Indonesia) Lanny Tria Mayasari / Ribka Sugiarto (quarter-finals)
7. (Indonesia) Nita Violina Marwah / Tryola Nadia (quarter-finals)
8. (Indonesia) Fitriani / Jesica Moeljati (second round)

=== Finals ===
Semi-finals
1	(Japan) Rui Hirokami (Japan) Yuna Kato	21	18	21
3	(South Korea) Kim Min-ji (South Korea) Seong Seung-yeon	19	21	17
5	(Japan) Rena Miyaura (Japan) Ayako Sakuramoto	21	21
(Indonesia) Jesita Putri Miantoro (Indonesia) Febi Setianingrum	11	13

Final
1	(Japan) Rui Hirokami (Japan) Yuna Kato	23	21
5	(Japan) Rena Miyaura (Japan) Ayako Sakuramoto	21	18

=== Top half ===
==== Section 1 ====
First round
(Indonesia) M Mahmudin (Indonesia) R E Putri Sari	21	16	21
(Indonesia) B M Rumambi (Indonesia) M C Sahputri	19	21	14

Second round
1	(Japan) R Hirokami (Japan) Y Kato	21	21
(Chinese Taipei) Li T-p (Chinese Taipei) Wang X-y	16	18
6	(Indonesia) L T Mayasari (Indonesia) R Sugiarto	21	21
(Indonesia) M Mahmudin (Indonesia) R E Putri Sari	12	14

Quarter-finals
1	(Japan) R Hirokami (Japan) Y Kato	w	/	o
6	(Indonesia) L T Mayasari (Indonesia) R Sugiarto

==== Section 2 ====
First round
(Indonesia) D P Cahyadewi (Indonesia) M I Cindiani	18	17
(Malaysia) Go P K (Malaysia) V Ng	21	21

Second round
3	(South Korea) Kim M-j (South Korea) Seong S-y	16	21	22
(Indonesia) S Kani (Malaysia) Tang W X	21	15	20
7	(Indonesia) N V Marwah (Indonesia) T Nadia	21	21
(Malaysia) Go P K (Malaysia) V Ng	11	11

Quarter-finals
3	(South Korea) Kim M-j (South Korea) Seong S-y	16	21	21
7	(Indonesia) N V Marwah (Indonesia) T Nadia	21	19	13

=== Bottom half ===
==== Section 3 ====
First round
(China) Li YJ (China) Luo XM	21	21
(Thailand) S Palaiphoon (Thailand) M Puthawilai	13	9

Second round
(China) Li YJ (China) Luo XM	22	13
5	(Japan) R Miyaura (Japan) A Sakuramoto	24	21
(China) Lin FL (China) Tan N	17	19
4	(Japan) S Hobara (Japan) H Suzuki	21	21

Quarter-finals
5	(Japan) R Miyaura (Japan) A Sakuramoto	20	21	22
4	(Japan) S Hobara (Japan) H Suzuki	22	13	20

==== Section 4 ====
First round
(Indonesia) S A M Asharunnisa (Indonesia) S N Husnia	18	10
(Indonesia) J P Miantoro (Indonesia) F Setianingrum	21	21

Second round
(Indonesia) J P Miantoro (Indonesia) F Setianingrum	21	21
8	(Indonesia) Fitriani (Indonesia) J Moeljati	13	15
(Indonesia) R A Fatasya (Indonesia) K Larissa	19	21	22
2	(Thailand) P Pharcharaphisutsin (Thailand) N Sukklad	21	19	20

Quarter-finals
(Indonesia) J P Miantoro (Indonesia) F Setianingrum	21	21
(Indonesia) R A Fatasya (Indonesia) K Larissa	16	10

== Mixed doubles ==
=== Seeds ===
1. (Japan) Yujiro Nishikawa / Saori Ozaki (quarter-finals)
2. (Indonesia) Dejan Ferdinansyah / Gloria Emanuelle Widjaja (semi-finals)
3. (South Korea) Na Sung-seung / Kim Min-ji (second round)
4. (Indonesia) Akbar Bintang Cahyono / Marsheilla Gischa Islami (quarter-finals)
5. (Indonesia) Hafiz Faizal / Melati Daeva Oktavianti (quarter-finals)
6. (Indonesia) Amri Syahnawi / Winny Oktavina Kandow (quarter-finals)
7. (Indonesia) Adnan Maulana / Nita Violina Marwah (second round)
8. (Malaysia) Tan Ming Kang / (Indonesia) Serena Kani (second round)

=== Finals ===
Semi-finals
(Indonesia) Jafar Hidayatullah (Indonesia) Aisyah Salsabila Putri Pranata	21	21	14
(China) Cheng Xing (China) Chen Fanghui	23	13	21
(China) Jiang Zhenbang (China) Wei Yaxin	21	15	23
2	(Indonesia) Dejan Ferdinansyah (Indonesia) Gloria Emanuelle Widjaja	17	21	21

Final
(China) Cheng Xing (China) Chen Fanghui	12	15
(China) Jiang Zhenbang (China) Wei Yaxin	21	21

=== Top half ===
==== Section 1 ====
First round
(Indonesia) R K Suwardi (Indonesia) N Ivyana	21	18	21
(Indonesia) C S Gumilar (Indonesia) A H Taisir	16	21	11
(Chinese Taipei) Lin Y-c (Chinese Taipei) Wang X-y	9	13
(Indonesia) J Hidayatullah (Indonesia) A S P Pranata	21	21

Second round
1	(Japan) Y Nishikawa (Japan) S Ozaki	21	21
(Indonesia) R K Suwardi (Indonesia) N Ivyana	9	10
8	(Malaysia) Tan M K (Indonesia) S Kani	19	8
(Indonesia) J Hidayatullah (Indonesia) A S P Pranata	21	21

Quarter-finals
1	(Japan) Y Nishikawa (Japan) S Ozaki	21	10	8
(Indonesia) J Hidayatullah (Indonesia) A S P Pranata	19	21	21

==== Section 2 ====
First round
(Indonesia) V Suwarland (Indonesia) M C Sahputri	13	15
(China) Cheng X (China) Chen FH	21	21
(Indonesia) G M Al Ilham (Indonesia) I C S Jamil	21	21
(Malaysia) Ling W J (Malaysia) Tang W X	11	18

Second round
3	(South Korea) Na S-s (South Korea) Kim M-j	17	21	15
(China) Cheng X (China) Chen FH	21	15	21
5	(Indonesia) H Faizal (Indonesia) M D Oktavianti	22	15	21
(Indonesia) G M Al Ilham (Indonesia) I C S Jamil	20	21	13

Quarter-finals
(China) Cheng X (China) Chen FH	12	21	21
5	(Indonesia) H Faizal (Indonesia) M D Oktavianti	21	11	19

=== Bottom half ===
==== Section 3 ====
First round
(China) Jiang ZB (China) Wei YX	21	21
(Indonesia) M. L A Apriyanda (Indonesia) B M Rumambi	5	13
(India) T Kona (India) S K P Kudaravalli	9	7
7	(Indonesia) A Maulana (Indonesia) N V Marwah	21	21
(Malaysia) Loo B K (Malaysia) Yap C W	21	21
(Chinese Taipei) Chen C-y (Chinese Taipei) Hsieh Y-y	8	16

Second round
(China) Jiang ZB (China) Wei YX	21	21
7	(Indonesia) A Maulana (Indonesia) N V Marwah	12	15
(Malaysia) Loo B K (Malaysia) Yap C W	11	13
4	(Indonesia) A B Cahyono (Indonesia) M G Islami	21	21

Quarter-finals
(China) Jiang ZB (China) Wei YX	21	21
4	(Indonesia) A B Cahyono (Indonesia) M G Islami	13	16

==== Section 4 ====
First round
(Chinese Taipei) Su L-w (Chinese Taipei) Li T-p	12	12
(Malaysia) Choong H J (Malaysia) Go P K	21	21
(South Korea) Na G-m (South Korea) Seong S-y	17	18
(Indonesia) A E Prasetya (Indonesia) M Mahmudin	21	21

Second round
(Malaysia) Choong H J (Malaysia) Go P K	11	21	13
6	(Indonesia) A Syahnawi (Indonesia) W O Kandow	21	15	21
(Indonesia) A E Prasetya (Indonesia) M Mahmudin	21	11	14
2	(Indonesia) D Ferdinansyah (Indonesia) G E Widjaja	19	21	21

Quarter-finals
6	(Indonesia) A Syahnawi (Indonesia) W O Kandow	14	14
2	(Indonesia) D Ferdinansyah (Indonesia) G E Widjaja	21	21

Preceded by 2019 Indonesia Masters Super 100	Indonesia Masters Super 100	Succeeded by 2023 Indonesia Masters Super 100 I
Preceded by 2022 Canada Open	BWF World Tour; 2022 BWF season	Succeeded by 2022 Denmark Open
