= 2022 Canada Open =

Tournament details
- Dates: 27 September – 2 October
- Edition: 57th
- Level: Super 100
- Total prize money: US$75,000
- Venue: Markin-MacPhail Centre
- Location: Calgary, Alberta, Canada

Champions
- Men's singles: (France) Alex Lanier
- Women's singles: (Canada) Michelle Li
- Men's doubles: (Japan) Ayato Endo (Japan) Yuta Takei
- Women's doubles: (Japan) Rena Miyaura (Japan) Ayako Sakuramoto
- Mixed doubles: (Chinese Taipei) Ye Hong-wei (Chinese Taipei) Lee Chia-hsin

The 2022 Canada Open (officially known as the Yonex Canada Open 2022 for sponsorship reasons) was a badminton tournament which took place at Markin-MacPhail Centre in Calgary, Canada, from 27 September to 2 October 2022 and had a total purse of $75,000.

== Tournament ==
The 2022 Canada Open was the fourth Super 100 tournament of the 2022 BWF World Tour and also part of the Canada Open championships, which had been held since 1957. This tournament was organized by the Badminton Alberta and Badminton Canada and sanctioned by the BWF.

=== Venue ===
This international tournament was held at Markin-MacPhail Centre in Calgary, Alberta, Canada.

=== Point distribution ===
Below is the point distribution table for each phase of the tournament based on the BWF points system for the BWF Tour Super 100 event.

Winner	Runner-up	3/4	5/8	9/16	17/32	33/64
5,500	4,680	3,850	3,030	2,110	1,290	510

=== Prize pool ===
The total prize money was US$75,000 with the distribution of the prize money in accordance with BWF regulations.

Event	Winner	Finalist	Semi-finals	Quarter-finals	Last 16
Singles	$5,625	$2,850	$1,087.5	$450	$262.5
Doubles	$5,925	$2,850	$1,050	$543.75	$281.25

== Men's singles ==
=== Seeds ===
1. (Canada) Brian Yang (quarter-finals)
2. (Guatemala) Kevin Cordón (withdrew)
3. (Israel) Misha Zilberman (semi-finals)
4. (France) Arnaud Merklé (semi-finals)
5. (Canada) Jason Ho-Shue (quarter-finals)
6. (Brazil) Ygor Coelho (quarter-finals)
7. (Spain) Pablo Abián (third round)
8. (Denmark) Victor Svendsen (quarter-finals)

=== Finals ===
Semi-finals
(Japan) Takuma Obayashi	21	25
3	(Israel) Misha Zilberman	11	23
4	(France) Arnaud Merklé	24	21	19
(France) Alex Lanier	26	16	21

Final
(Japan) Takuma Obayashi	12	21	13
(France) Alex Lanier	21	12	21

=== Top half ===
==== Section 1 ====
First round
(Canada) K Shi	21	21
(Canada) P Mak	14	11
(Canada) J Ko	6	6
(Japan) T Obayashi	21	21

Second round
1	(Canada) B Yang	21	21
(Canada) D Zhou	18	10
(Canada) N Appave	16	21	21
(Canada) K Shi	21	19	8
7	(Spain) P Abián	21	21
(Slovakia) M Dratva	18	15
(Canada) J Akin-Mulrooney	5	12
(Japan) T Obayashi	21	21

Third round
1	(Canada) B Yang	21	21
(Canada) N Appave	9	8
7	(Spain) P Abián	9	13
(Japan) T Obayashi	21	21

Quarter-finals
1	(Canada) B Yang	19	15
(Japan) T Obayashi	21	21

==== Section 2 ====
First round
(Canada) E Wong	13	7
(United States) H Shu	21	21
(United States) K Chong	12	21	23
(Canada) Wong Y K	21	18	21
(Canada) R Rankin	2	5
(France) L Claerbout	21	21

Second round
3	(Israel) M Zilberman	21	21
(Malta) M Abela	9	13
(Trinidad and Tobago) N Bonkowsky	7	11
(United States) H Shu	21	21
8	(Denmark) V Svendsen	21	21
(United States) K Chong	10	6
(United States) E Asuncion	16	4
(France) L Claerbout	21	21

Third round
3	(Israel) M Zilberman	21	21
(United States) H Shu	8	18
8	(Denmark) V Svendsen	21	21
(France) L Claerbout	17	19

Quarter-finals
3	(Israel) M Zilberman	24	21
8	(Denmark) V Svendsen	22	14

=== Bottom half ===
==== Section 3 ====
First round
(Canada) L Y Chung	21	21
(Canada) A Ouano	12	16
(Canada) N Y Aung	15	7
(Canada) Kan C-y	21	21
(Canada) A Menzel	21	21
(Canada) P Ouano	17	18

Second round
(Canada) L Y Chung	21	21
(Canada) J Li	8	11
(Canada) Kan C-y	13	21
5	(Canada) J Ho-Shue	21	23
(Canada) A Menzel	16	15
(Sweden) J Nilsson	21	21
(Canada) A Kshatriya	10	6
4	(France) A Merklé	21	21

Third round
(Canada) L Y Chung	9	8
5	(Canada) J Ho-Shue	21	21
(Sweden) J Nilsson	12	5
4	(France) A Merklé	21	21

Quarter-finals
5	(Canada) J Ho-Shue	21	12	6
4	(France) A Merklé	14	21	21

==== Section 4 ====
First round
(Canada) C Weibe	8	10
(Spain) L E Peñalver	21	21
(Canada) K M DeRaj	19	14
(Canada) E Chan	21	21
(Canada) J Yang	12	11
(United States) A Mar	21	21

Second round
(Spain) L E Peñalver	21	21
(Canada) I Wadia	10	10
(Canada) E Chan	15	11
6	(Brazil) Y Coelho	21	21
(United States) A Mar	21	21
(Canada) A Wong	10	8
(France) A Lanier	w	/	o
2	(Guatemala) K Cordón

Third round
(Spain) L E Peñalver	15	16
6	(Brazil) Y Coelho	21	21
(United States) A Mar	14	11
(France) A Lanier	21	21

Quarter-finals
6	(Brazil) Y Coelho	8	19
(France) A Lanier	21	21

== Women's singles ==
=== Seeds ===
1. (Spain) Carolina Marín (semi-finals)
2. (Canada) Michelle Li (champion)
3. (United States) Beiwen Zhang (quarter-finals)
4. (Japan) Saena Kawakami (semi-finals)
5. (France) Qi Xuefei (quarter-finals)
6. (Japan) Natsuki Nidaira (quarter-finals)
7. (France) Léonice Huet (second round)
8. (United States) Lauren Lam (second round)

=== Finals ===
Semi-finals
1	(Spain) Carolina Marín	21	15	19
(Chinese Taipei) Sung Shuo-yun	9	21	21
4	(Japan) Saena Kawakami	21	16	21
2	(Canada) Michelle Li	16	21	23

Final
(Chinese Taipei) Sung Shuo-yun	16	15
2	(Canada) Michelle Li	21	21

=== Top half ===
==== Section 1 ====
First round
(Switzerland) J Stadelmann	21	21
(Canada) S Nong	11	10
6	(Japan) N Nidaira	21	21
(United States) F Corbett	10	13
(Canada) C Choi	12	13
(United States) K Ngo	21	21

Second round
1	(Spain) C Marín	19	21	21
(Switzerland) J Stadelmann	21	12	19
6	(Japan) N Nidaira	21	21
(United States) K Ngo	13	4

Quarter-finals
1	(Spain) C Marín	21	21
6	(Japan) N Nidaira	10	19

==== Section 2 ====
First round
3	(United States) BW Zhang	21	21
(United States) I Jaiswal	13	9
(Canada) J Cheung	21	20	23
(Canada) J Dent	10	22	25
7	(France) L Huet	21	21
(India) S K P Kudaravalli	18	11
(Canada) A Yu	6	6
(Chinese Taipei) Sung S-y	21	21

Second round
3	(United States) BW Zhang	21	21
(Canada) J Dent	12	17
7	(France) L Huet	15	7
(Chinese Taipei) Sung S-y	21	21

Quarter-finals
3	(United States) BW Zhang	18	23
(Chinese Taipei) Sung S-y	21	25

=== Bottom half ===
==== Section 3 ====
First round
(Japan) R Gunji	21	21
(Canada) R Chan	19	14
(Chinese Taipei) Yu C-h	19	21	15
8	(United States) L Lam	21	18	21
(Canada) C Leblanc	16	17
(United States) E Shi	21	21
(United States) S Pandey	10	10
4	(Japan) S Kawakami	21	21

Second round
(Japan) R Gunji	21	21
8	(United States) L Lam	19	12
(United States) E Shi	16	9
4	(Japan) S Kawakami	21	21

Quarter-finals
(Japan) R Gunji	14	11
4	(Japan) S Kawakami	21	21

==== Section 4 ====
First round
(United States) D Gupta	10	21	21
(Canada) E Chan	21	9	13
(Canada) WY Zhang	21	16	20
5	(France) Qi XF	11	21	22
(Peru) I Castillo	10	16
(Canada) T Ng	21	21

Second round
(United States) D Gupta	12	8
5	(France) Qi XF	21	21
(Canada) T Ng	16	17
2	(Canada) M Li	21	21

Quarter-finals
5	(France) Qi XF	19	12
2	(Canada) M Li	21	21

== Men's doubles ==
=== Seeds ===
1. (Japan) Hiroki Okamura / Masayuki Onodera (semi-finals)
2. (United States) Vinson Chiu / Joshua Yuan (quarter-finals)
3. (Japan) Ayato Endo / Yuta Takei (champions)
4. (Canada) Adam Dong / Nyl Yakura (quarter-finals)
5. (Canada) Jason Ho-Shue / Joshua Hurlburt-Yu (quarter-finals)
6. (Japan) Takuto Inoue / Kenya Mitsuhashi (final)
7. (Japan) Shuntaro Mezaki / Haruya Nishida (semi-finals)
8. (Japan) Masato Takano / Katsuki Tamate (quarter-finals)

=== Finals ===
Semi-finals
1	(Japan) Hiroki Okamura (Japan) Masayuki Onodera	23	19	18
3	(Japan) Ayato Endo (Japan) Yuta Takei	21	21	21
7	(Japan) Shuntaro Mezaki (Japan) Haruya Nishida	16	16
6	(Japan) Takuto Inoue (Japan) Kenya Mitsuhashi	21	21

Final
3	(Japan) Ayato Endo (Japan) Yuta Takei	21	21
6	(Japan) Takuto Inoue (Japan) Kenya Mitsuhashi	15	8

=== Top half ===
==== Section 1 ====
First round

Second round
1	(Japan) H Okamura (Japan) M Onodera	21	21
(Canada) Kan C-y (India) T Kona	13	11
8	(Japan) M Takano (Japan) K Tamate	21	21
(Trinidad and Tobago) N Bonkowsky (Canada) P Mak	8	9

Quarter-finals
1	(Japan) H Okamura (Japan) M Onodera	23	21
8	(Japan) M Takano (Japan) K Tamate	21	19

==== Section 2 ====
First round
(United States) K Chong (United States) T Tan	17	21	21
(Canada) K M DeRaj (Canada) A Wong	21	14	19

Second round
3	(Japan) A Endo (Japan) Y Takei	21	21
(Canada) L Y Chung (Canada) J Yang	13	10
5	(Canada) J Ho-Shue (Canada) J Hurlburt-Yu	21	21
(United States) K Chong (United States) T Tan	15	13

Quarter-finals
3	(Japan) A Endo (Japan) Y Takei	21	21
5	(Canada) J Ho-Shue (Canada) J Hurlburt-Yu	6	12

=== Bottom half ===
==== Section 3 ====
First round
(Canada) A Ouano (Canada) P Ouano	18	15
(Canada) E Chan (England) K Pong	21	21

Second round
(Canada) E Chan (England) K Pong	8	12
7	(Japan) S Mezaki (Japan) H Nishida	21	21
(Canada) A Menzel (Canada) E Wong	5	6
4	(Canada) A Dong (Canada) N Yakura	21	21

Quarter-finals
7	(Japan) S Mezaki (Japan) H Nishida	21	21
4	(Canada) A Dong (Canada) N Yakura	18	14

==== Section 4 ====
First round
(Germany) B Geiss (Germany) D Hess	19	21	21
(Canada) K Lee (Canada) T A Linderman	21	12	15

Second round
(Germany) B Geiss (Germany) D Hess	17	18
6	(Japan) T Inoue (Japan) K Mitsuhashi	21	21
(Canada) X Laperrière (Canada) N Nguyen
2	(United States) V Chiu (United States) J Yuan	w	/	o

Quarter-finals
6	(Japan) T Inoue (Japan) K Mitsuhashi	17	21	21
2	(United States) V Chiu (United States) J Yuan	21	16	18

== Women's doubles ==
=== Seeds ===
1. (Canada) Rachel Honderich / Kristen Tsai (semi-finals)
2. (Canada) Catherine Choi / Josephine Wu (quarter-finals)
3. (United States) Francesca Corbett / Allison Lee (quarter-finals)
4. (Chinese Taipei) Lee Chia-hsin / Teng Chun-hsun (semi-finals)
5. (Japan) Rui Hirokami / Yuna Kato (final)
6. (Japan) Rena Miyaura / Ayako Sakuramoto (champions)
7. (Japan) Sayaka Hobara / Hinata Suzuki (quarter-finals)
8. (Peru) Inés Castillo / Paula la Torre Regal (second round)

=== Finals ===
Semi-finals
1	(Canada) Rachel Honderich (Canada) Kristen Tsai	17	10
6	(Japan) Rena Miyaura (Japan) Ayako Sakuramoto	21	21
4	(Chinese Taipei) Lee Chia-hsin (Chinese Taipei) Teng Chun-hsun	15	25
5	(Japan) Rui Hirokami (Japan) Yuna Kato	21	27

Final
6	(Japan) Rena Miyaura (Japan) Ayako Sakuramoto	21	21
5	(Japan) Rui Hirokami (Japan) Yuna Kato	13	8

=== Top half ===
==== Section 1 ====
First round

Second round
1	(Canada) R Honderich (Canada) K Tsai	w	/	o
(Canada) E Chan (Canada) E Hermanto
8	(Peru) I Castillo (Peru) P la Torre Regal	8	21	16
(Canada) C Lai (Canada) WY Zhang	21	19	21

Quarter-finals
1	(Canada) R Honderich (Canada) K Tsai	21	21
(Canada) C Lai (Canada) WY Zhang	11	10

==== Section 2 ====
First round
(Canada) J Dent (United States) K T Lee	21	20	16
(Chinese Taipei) Sung S-y (Chinese Taipei) Yu C-h	17	22	21

Second round
3	(United States) F Corbett (United States) A Lee	21	21
(Canada) Ch Choi (Canada) S Nong	9	15
6	(Japan) R Miyaura (Japan) A Sakuramoto	21	21
(Chinese Taipei) Sung S-y (Chinese Taipei) Yu C-h	16	11

Quarter-finals
3	(United States) F Corbett (United States) A Lee	18	8
6	(Japan) R Miyaura (Japan) A Sakuramoto	21	21

=== Bottom half ===
==== Section 3 ====
First round
(Canada) Y Tai (Canada) A Yu	20	13
(Germany) L Michalski (Germany) F Volkmann	22	21

Second round
(Germany) L Michalski (Germany) F Volkmann	5	12
7	(Japan) S Hobara (Japan) H Suzuki	21	21
(United States) A Xu (United States) K Xu	16	19
4	(Chinese Taipei) Lee C-h (Chinese Taipei) Teng C-h	21	21

Quarter-finals
7	(Japan) S Hobara (Japan) H Suzuki	14	14
4	(Chinese Taipei) Lee C-h (Chinese Taipei) Teng C-h	21	21

==== Section 4 ====
First round

Second round
(United States) J Gai (United States) I Jaiswal	11	21	14
5	(Japan) R Hirokami (Japan) Y Kato	21	18	21
(Canada) C Leblanc (Canada) A Mocanu	7	8
2	(Canada) Ca Choi (Canada) J Wu	21	21

Quarter-finals
5	(Japan) R Hirokami (Japan) Y Kato	21	21
2	(Canada) Ca Choi (Canada) J Wu	14	14

== Mixed doubles ==
=== Seeds ===
1. (Japan) Hiroki Midorikawa / Natsu Saito (final)
2. (Japan) Yujiro Nishikawa / Saori Ozaki (quarter-finals)
3. (United States) Vinson Chiu / Jennie Gai (quarter-finals)
4. (Germany) Patrick Scheiel / Franziska Volkmann (second round)
5. (Canada) Ty Alexander Lindeman / Josephine Wu (quarter-finals)
6. (Israel) Misha Zilberman / Svetlana Zilberman (second round)
7. (Chinese Taipei) Ye Hong-wei / Lee Chia-hsin (champions)
8. (Canada) Nicolas Nguyen / Alexandra Mocanu (withdrew)

=== Finals ===
Semi-finals
1	(Japan) Hiroki Midorikawa (Japan) Natsu Saito	21	21
(Canada) Nyl Yakura (Canada) Crystal Lai	11	15
(Canada) Kevin Lee (Canada) Jacqueline Cheung	21	14	15
7	(Chinese Taipei) Ye Hong-wei (Chinese Taipei) Lee Chia-hsin	18	21	21

Final
1	(Japan) Hiroki Midorikawa (Japan) Natsu Saito	21	12	15
7	(Chinese Taipei) Ye Hong-wei (Chinese Taipei) Lee Chia-hsin	12	21	21

=== Top half ===
==== Section 1 ====
First round
(United States) R Zheng (United States) S Pandey	18	21	21
(United States) T Tan (United States) E Shi	21	15	4

Second round
1	(Japan) H Midorikawa (Japan) N Saito	21	21
(United States) K Cong (United States) K Ngo	6	3
5	(Canada) T A Lindeman (Canada) J Wu	21	21
(United States) R Zheng (United States) S Pandey	11	8

Quarter-finals
1	(Japan) H Midorikawa (Japan) N Saito	21	17	21
5	(Canada) T A Lindeman (Canada) J Wu	15	21	11

==== Section 2 ====
First round
(United States) A Mar (United States) K Lee	9	7
(Canada) N Yakura (Canada) C Lai	21	21
(United States) J Yuan (United States) A Lee	21	21
(Canada) Kan C-y (Canada) Y Tai	19	16

Second round
4	(Germany) P Scheiel (Germany) F Volkmann	14	18
(Canada) N Yakura (Canada) C Lai	21	21
6	(Israel) M Zilberman (Israel) S Zilberman	10	2
(United States) J Yuan (United States) A Lee	21	21

Quarter-finals
(Canada) N Yakura (Canada) C Lai	21	21
(United States) J Yuan (United States) A Lee	19	10

=== Bottom half ===
==== Section 3 ====
First round
(Canada) Lam W L (Canada) J Dent	19	17
(Canada) K Lee (Canada) J Cheung	21	21
(Canada) D Zhou (Canada) A Yu	21	21
(India) T Kona (India) S K P Kudaravalli	17	18

Second round
(Canada) K Lee (Canada) J Cheung	w	/	o
8	(Canada) N Nguyen (Canada) A Mocanu
(Canada) D Zhou (Canada) A Yu	7	13
3	(United States) V Chiu (United States) J Gai	21	21

Quarter-finals
(Canada) K Lee (Canada) J Cheung	21	21
3	(United States) V Chiu (United States) J Gai	19	12

==== Section 4 ====
First round
(Germany) B Geiss (Germany) L Michalski	21	21
(Canada) E Wong (Canada) E Hermanto	10	9

Second round
(Germany) B Geiss (Germany) L Michalski	19	17
7	(Chinese Taipei) Ye H-w (Chinese Taipei) Lee C-h	21	21
(Canada) N Y Aung (Canada) C Choi	15	16
2	(Japan) Y Nishikawa (Japan) S Ozaki	21	21

Quarter-finals
7	(Chinese Taipei) Ye H-w (Chinese Taipei) Lee C-h	21	21
2	(Japan) Y Nishikawa (Japan) S Ozaki	16	19

Preceded by 2019 Canada Open	Canada Open	Succeeded by 2023 Canada Open
Preceded by 2022 Vietnam Open	BWF World Tour; 2022 BWF season	Succeeded by 2022 Indonesia Masters Super 100
