= Rui Hirokami =

Japanese badminton player (born 2002)

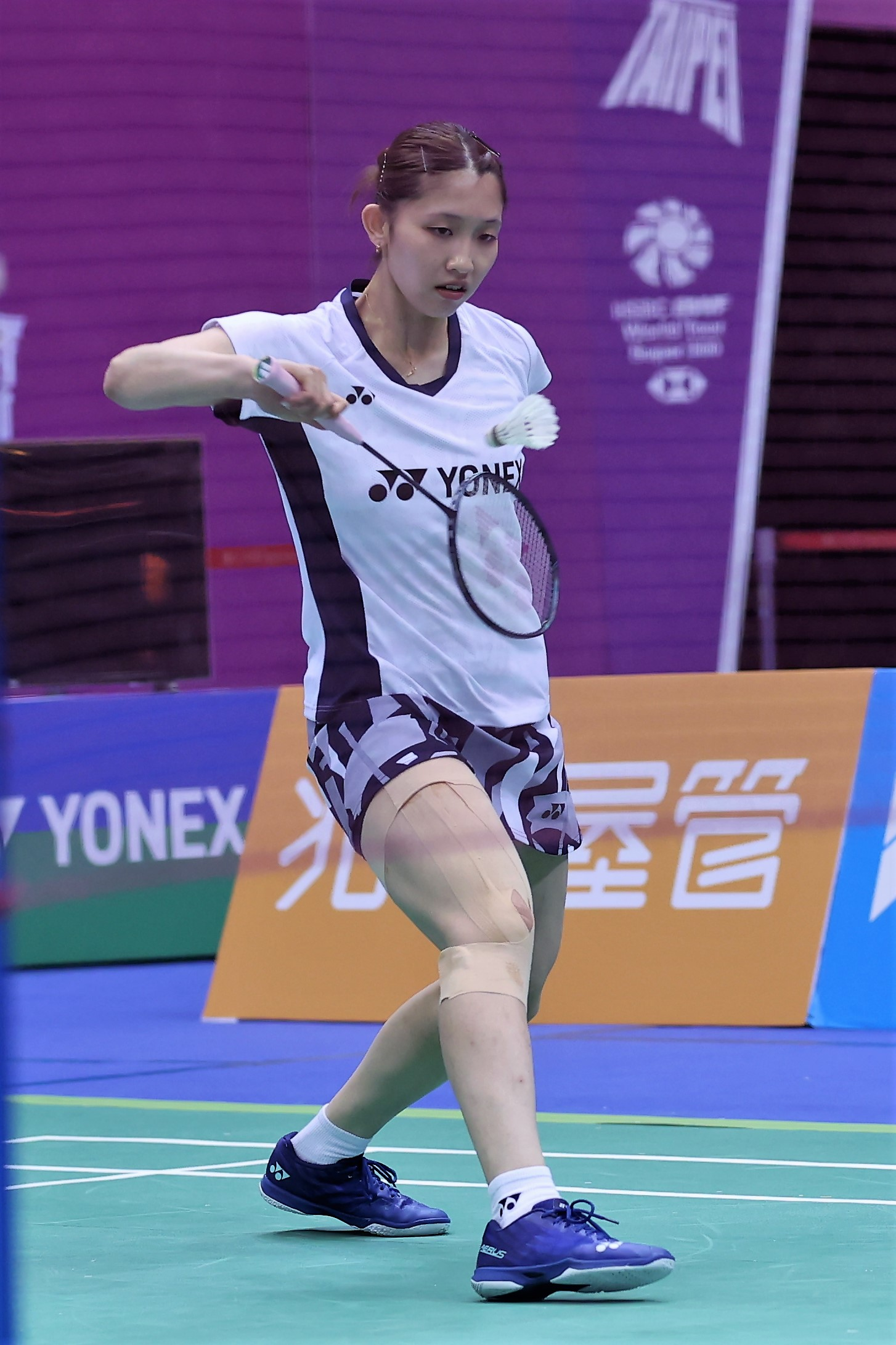
- Hirokami at the 2025 Taipei Open

Personal information
- Born: 26 July 2002 (age 24) Takaoka, Toyama, Japan
- Height: 1.67 m (5 ft 6 in)

Sport
- Country: Japan
- Sport: Badminton
- Handedness: Right
- Coached by: Kei Nakashima

Women's doubles
- Highest ranking: 11 (WD with Sayaka Hobara, 30 June 2026)
- Current ranking: 13 (WD with Sayaka Hobara, 17 November 2026)
- BWF profile
Medal record
Women's badminton
Representing Japan
Asia Team Championships
Bronze medal – third place	2022 Selangor	Women's team
World Junior Championships
Bronze medal – third place	2019 Kazan	Mixed team

Rui Hirokami (廣上 瑠依, Hirokami Rui; born 26 July 2002) is a Japanese badminton player who competes in women's doubles. Partnering with Yuna Kato from 2022 to 2024, she won her first BWF World Tour title at the 2022 Indonesia Masters Super 100 and finished as runner-up at three Super 300 tournaments: the Taipei Open, the Korea Masters, and the Orléans Masters. She was also a member of the Japanese team that won a bronze medal at the Asia Team Championships.

In March 2025, she transferred to the Yonex badminton team and began partnering with Sayaka Hobara. With Hobara she reached a career-high world ranking of No. 11 and won her first Super 500 title at the 2026 Korea Open.

== Career ==
=== 2022–2024: First World Tour title and world top 20 ranking ===
Hirokami began competing regularly at the senior international level in 2022 in partnership with Yuna Kato. On the BWF World Tour, the pair finished as runners-up at the Super 300 Taipei Open and the Super 100 Canada Open. They won their first World Tour title at the Indonesia Masters Super 100, defeating compatriots Rena Miyaura and Ayako Sakuramoto in the final. They also won two International Challenge titles at the Mexican International and the Belgian International. That year, Hirokami contributed to Japan's bronze medal at the Asia Team Championships in Selangor. Starting the year unranked, they elevated their world ranking to No. 25 by 26 December 2022.

In 2023, Hirokami and Kato reached a career-high ranking of No. 18 in May. Their best World Tour result was a runner-up finish at the Super 300 Korea Masters, where they lost to Jeong Na-eun and Kim Hye-jeong. They also reached the quarterfinals of the Thailand Masters and Spain Masters.

In 2024, the pair were runners-up at the Super 300 Orléans Masters. They also reached the semifinals of the U.S. Open and the quarterfinals of the Swiss Open. Mid-year, Hirokami partnered briefly with Rui Kiyama and advanced to the quarterfinals of the Indonesia Masters Super 100. She later reunited with Kato at the Japan Masters, where they exited in the second round.

=== 2025–2026: New partnership and first Super 500 title ===
In March 2025, Hirokami transferred to the Yonex badminton team and began partnering with Sayaka Hobara. The pair made their debut at the Super 300 Taipei Open in May, reaching the semifinals. The following week, they entered the Super 500 Thailand Open as qualifiers and advanced to the semifinals, the first time a qualifying doubles pair had reached that stage of the tournament in any discipline since 2013. Later in the year, they reached the semifinals of the Super 500 Hong Kong Open. En route, they defeated the newly crowned world champions Liu Shengshu and Tan Ning in the second round, and the fourth-seeded Li Yijing and Luo Xumin in the quarterfinals.

In 2026, Hirokami and Hobara reached the semifinals of the Orléans Masters and the Thailand Open. At the Super 1000 Indonesia Open, they advanced to the semifinals after defeating second seeds Pearly Tan and Thinaah Muralitharan in the quarterfinals, before losing to the eventual champions Yuki Fukushima and Mayu Matsumoto. The pair attained a career-high world ranking of No. 11 on 30 June. At the World Championships, they reached the third round, where they lost to eventual champions Baek Ha-na and Lee So-hee. In November, they won their first Super 500 title at the Korea Open, defeating Kim Yu-jung and Lee Yu-lim in the final.

== Achievements ==
=== BWF World Tour (2 titles, 4 runners-up) ===
The BWF World Tour, which was announced on 19 March 2017 and implemented in 2018, is a series of elite badminton tournaments sanctioned by the Badminton World Federation (BWF). The BWF World Tour is divided into levels of World Tour Finals, Super 1000, Super 750, Super 500, Super 300 (part of the HSBC World Tour), and the BWF Tour Super 100.

Women's doubles
Year	Tournament	Level	Partner	Opponent	Score	Result	Ref.
2022	Taipei Open	Super 300	(Japan) Yuna Kato	(Hong Kong) Ng Tsz Yau (Hong Kong) Tsang Hiu Yan	15–21, 21–18, 19–21	(silver) Runner-up	
2022	Canada Open	Super 100	(Japan) Yuna Kato	(Japan) Rena Miyaura (Japan) Ayako Sakuramoto	13–21, 8–21	(silver) Runner-up	
2022	Indonesia Masters	Super 100	(Japan) Yuna Kato	(Japan) Rena Miyaura (Japan) Ayako Sakuramoto	23–21, 21–18	(gold) Winner	
2023	Korea Masters	Super 300	(Japan) Yuna Kato	(South Korea) Jeong Na-eun (South Korea) Kim Hye-jeong	12–21, 19–21	(silver) Runner-up	
2024	Orléans Masters	Super 300	(Japan) Yuna Kato	(Indonesia) Meilysa Trias Puspita Sari (Indonesia) Rachel Allessya Rose	12–21, 18–21	(silver) Runner-up	
2026	Korea Open	Super 500	(Japan) Sayaka Hobara	(South Korea) Kim Yu-jung (South Korea) Lee Yu-lim	21–18, 21–18	(gold) Winner	

=== BWF International Challenge/Series (2 titles) ===
Women's doubles
Year	Tournament	Partner	Opponent	Score	Result	Ref.
2022	Mexican International	(Japan) Yuna Kato	(Japan) Ayako Sakuramoto (Japan) Hinata Suzuki	15–21, 21–19, 21–17	(gold) Winner	
2022	Belgian International	(Japan) Yuna Kato	(Chinese Taipei) Chang Ching-hui (Chinese Taipei) Yang Ching-tun	21–7, 21–15	(gold) Winner	

BWF International Challenge tournament

=== BWF Junior International (1 title) ===
Girls' doubles
Year	Tournament	Partner	Opponent	Score	Result	Ref.
2020	German Junior	(Japan) Yuna Kato	(South Korea) Lee So-yul (South Korea) Yoo A-yeon	21–13, 21–14	(gold) Winner	

BWF Junior International Grand Prix tournament

== Record against selected opponents ==
Record against year-end Finals finalists, World Championships semi-finalists, and Olympic quarter-finalists. Accurate as of 23 August 2026.

=== Yuna Kato ===
Players	M	W	L	Diff.
(China) Liu Shengshu & Tan Ning	2	0	2	–2
(China) Zhang Shuxian & Zheng Yu	2	0	2	–2
(India) Treesa Jolly & Gayatri Gopichand	1	1	0	+1
(Japan) Yuki Fukushima & Sayaka Hirota	1	0	1	–1
(Japan) Mayu Matsumoto & Wakana Nagahara	2	0	2	–2
(Malaysia) Pearly Tan & Thinaah Muralitharan	2	0	2	–2
(South Korea) Baek Ha-na & Lee So-hee	2	0	2	–2
(South Korea) Kim So-yeong & Kong Hee-yong	1	0	1	–1
(Thailand) Benyapa Aimsaard & Nuntakarn Aimsaard	1	0	1	–1

=== Sayaka Hobara ===
Players	M	W	L	Diff.
(Bulgaria) Gabriela Stoeva & Stefani Stoeva	3	2	1	+1
(China) Chen Qingchen & Jia Yifan	1	0	1	–1
(China) Li Yijing & Luo Xumin	2	1	1	0
(China) Liu Shengshu & Tan Ning	2	1	1	0
(India) Treesa Jolly & Gayatri Gopichand	1	1	0	+1
(Japan) Yuki Fukushima & Mayu Matsumoto	2	0	2	–2
(Japan) Rin Iwanaga & Kie Nakanishi	3	0	3	–3
(Japan) Nami Matsuyama & Chiharu Shida	1	0	1	–1
(Malaysia) Pearly Tan & Thinaah Muralitharan	3	1	2	–1
(South Korea) Baek Ha-na & Lee So-hee	1	0	1	–1
