= 2022 Taipei Open =

Tournament details
- Dates: 19–24 July
- Edition: 39th
- Level: Super 300
- Total prize money: US$500,000
- Venue: Taipei Heping Basketball Gymnasium
- Location: Taipei, Taiwan

Champions
- Men's singles: (Chinese Taipei) Chou Tien-chen
- Women's singles: (Chinese Taipei) Tai Tzu-ying
- Men's doubles: (Malaysia) Man Wei Chong (Malaysia) Tee Kai Wun
- Women's doubles: (Hong Kong) Ng Tsz Yau (Hong Kong) Tsang Hiu Yan
- Mixed doubles: (Hong Kong) Lee Chun Hei (Hong Kong) Ng Tsz Yau

The 2022 Taipei Open (officially known as the Yonex Taipei Open 2022) was a badminton tournament which took place at Taipei Heping Basketball Gymnasium in Taipei, Taiwan, from 19 to 24 July 2022 and had a total purse of $500,000.

Hongkonger Ng Tsz Yau became the first player to win multiple categories in a single Taipei Open edition since American Tony Gunawan and Taiwanese Cheng Wen-hsing won the mixed doubles as a pair and their respective same-sex doubles finals in 2005.

== Tournament ==
The 2022 Taipei Open was the fifteenth tournament of the 2022 BWF World Tour and also part of the Taipei Open championships, which had been held since 1980. This tournament was organized by the Chinese Taipei Badminton Association with sanction from the BWF.

=== Venue ===
This international tournament was held at Taipei Heping Basketball Gymnasium in Taipei, Taiwan.

=== Point distribution ===
Below is the point distribution table for each phase of the tournament based on the BWF points system for the BWF World Tour Super 300 event.

Winner	Runner-up	3/4	5/8	9/16	17/32	33/64	65/128
7,000	5,950	4,900	3,850	2,750	1,670	660	320

=== Prize pool ===
The total prize money was US$500,000 with the distribution of the prize money in accordance with BWF regulations.

Event	Winner	Finalist	Semi-finals	Quarter-finals	Last 16
Singles	$37,500	$19,000	$7,250	$3,000	$1,750
Doubles	$39,500	$19,000	$7,000	$3,625	$1,875

== Men's singles ==
=== Seeds ===
1. (Chinese Taipei) Chou Tien-chen (champion)
2. (Chinese Taipei) Wang Tzu-wei (quarter-finals)
3. (India) Parupalli Kashyap (quarter-finals)
4. (Japan) Kodai Naraoka (final)
5. (Indonesia) Chico Aura Dwi Wardoyo (withdrew)
6. (Japan) Koki Watanabe (second round)
7. (Thailand) Khosit Phetpradab (quarter-finals)
8. (Israel) Misha Zilberman (first round)

=== Finals ===
Semi-finals
1	(Chinese Taipei) Chou Tien-chen	21	21
(Malaysia) Soong Joo Ven	12	12
4	(Japan) Kodai Naraoka	21	22
(Chinese Taipei) Lin Chun-yi	19	20

Final
1	(Chinese Taipei) Chou Tien-chen	14	21	21
4	(Japan) Kodai Naraoka	21	10	6

=== Top half ===
==== Section 1 ====
First round
1	(Chinese Taipei) Chou T-c	14	21	21
(Chinese Taipei) Lu C-h	21	13	18
(India) K George	23	21
(Azerbaijan) A R Dwicahyo	21	17
PFQ	(Malaysia) Yeoh S Z	21	13	16
Q3	(Chinese Taipei) Chen C-t	15	21	21
Q2	(Chinese Taipei) Yu S-p	16	15
(India) P Rajawat	21	21

Second round
1	(Chinese Taipei) Chou T-c	23	16	21
(India) K George	21	21	7
Q3	(Chinese Taipei) Chen C-t	21	21
(India) P Rajawat	19	13

Quarter-finals
1	(Chinese Taipei) Chou T-c	21	2
Q3	(Chinese Taipei) Chen C-t	13	2^{r}

==== Section 2 ====
First round
3	(India) Parupalli K	24	21
Q4	(Chinese Taipei) Chi Y-j	22	10
(Austria) L Wraber	7	10
(Chinese Taipei) Lee C-h	21	21
6	(Japan) K Watanabe	21	21
(Chinese Taipei) Lin Y-h	12	10
(Malaysia) Cheam J W	21	17	16
(Malaysia) Soong J V	15	21	21

Second round
3	(India) Parupalli K	21	21
(Chinese Taipei) Lee C-h	10	19
6	(Japan) K Watanabe	6	23
(Malaysia) Soong J V	21	25

Quarter-finals
3	(India) Parupalli K	12	21	17
(Malaysia) Soong J V	21	12	21

=== Bottom half ===
==== Section 3 ====
First round
(Germany) M Weißkirchen	21	21
(Ukraine) D Bosniuk	17	13
(France) L Claerbout	12	21	11
7	(Thailand) K Phetpradab	21	9	21
(Denmark) K Bruun	17	15
(India) M Manjunath	21	21
(Brazil) Y Coelho	15	8
4	(Japan) K Naraoka	21	21

Second round
(Germany) M Weißkirchen	17	16
7	(Thailand) K Phetpradab	21	21
(India) M Manjunath	24	5	17
4	(Japan) K Naraoka	22	21	21

Quarter-finals
7	(Thailand) K Phetpradab	21	14	14
4	(Japan) K Naraoka	15	21	21

==== Section 4 ====
First round
(India) C Sen	19	9
(Chinese Taipei) Lin C-y	21	21
PFQ	(Thailand) A Namkul	21	15	21
8	(Israel) M Zilberman	19	21	19
(India) S Dey	11	17
Q1	(Malaysia) Leong J H	21	21
(Indonesia) I Rumbay	11	14
2	(Chinese Taipei) Wang T-w	21	21

Second round
(Chinese Taipei) Lin C-y	15	21	21
PFQ	(Thailand) A Namkul	21	8	9
Q1	(Malaysia) Leong J H	10	15
2	(Chinese Taipei) Wang T-w	21	21

Quarter-finals
(Chinese Taipei) Lin C-y	21	19	21
2	(Chinese Taipei) Wang T-w	13	21	10

== Women's singles ==
=== Seeds ===
1. (Chinese Taipei) Tai Tzu-ying (champion)
2. (Canada) Michelle Li (withdrew)
3. (United States) Beiwen Zhang (second round)
4. (India) Saina Nehwal (withdrew)
5. (Thailand) Supanida Katethong (second round)
6. (Japan) Aya Ohori (first round)
7. (Japan) Saena Kawakami (final)
8. (Chinese Taipei) Pai Yu-po (quarter-finals)

=== Finals ===
Semi-finals
1	(Chinese Taipei) Tai Tzu-ying	21	21
(Chinese Taipei) Hsu Wen-chi	14	17
(Japan) Natsuki Nidaira	13	11
7	(Japan) Saena Kawakami	21	21

Final
1	(Chinese Taipei) Tai Tzu-ying	21	21
7	(Japan) Saena Kawakami	17	16

=== Top half ===
==== Section 1 ====
First round
1	(Chinese Taipei) Tai T-y	21	21
PFQ	(Ukraine) P Buhrova	5	7
Q1	(Chinese Taipei) Hung E-t	21	21
(Poland) J Hart	18	17
8	(Chinese Taipei) Pai Y-p	21	21
PFQ	(India) S Toshniwal	10	16
(Vietnam) Nguyễn T L	9	19
Q2	(United States) I Jaiswal	21	21

Second round
1	(Chinese Taipei) Tai T-y	21	21
Q1	(Chinese Taipei) Hung E-t	6	8
8	(Chinese Taipei) Pai Y-p	21	21
Q2	(United States) I Jaiswal	12	9

Quarter-finals
1	(Chinese Taipei) Tai T-y	21	21
8	(Chinese Taipei) Pai Y-p	13	14

==== Section 2 ====
First round
PFQ	(Czech Republic) T Švábíková	12	18
PFQ	(Malaysia) Eoon Q X	21	21
(Canada) T Ng	15	16
(United States) L Lam	21	21
6	(Japan) A Ohori	21	10	13
(Chinese Taipei) Hsu W-c	9	21	21
(India) S I Farooqui	21	21
(Malaysia) Kisona S	15	11

Second round
PFQ	(Malaysia) Eoon Q X	21	15	15
(United States) L Lam	18	21	21
(Chinese Taipei) Hsu W-c	21	21
(India) S I Farooqui	18	13

Quarter-finals
(United States) L Lam	13	10
(Chinese Taipei) Hsu W-c	21	21

=== Bottom half ===
==== Section 3 ====
First round
Q3	(Chinese Taipei) Liang T-y	10	21	21
(India) M Bansod	21	15	14
(United States) J Gai	13	9
5	(Thailand) S Katethong	21	21
(Japan) N Nidaira	21	21
PFQ	(India) S K P Kudaravalli	10	11
(Chinese Taipei) Sung S-y	17	14
3	(United States) BW Zhang	21	21

Second round
Q3	(Chinese Taipei) Liang T-y	21	21
5	(Thailand) S Katethong	13	11
(Japan) N Nidaira	21	21
3	(United States) BW Zhang	19	19

Quarter-finals
Q3	(Chinese Taipei) Liang T-y	11	21	18
(Japan) N Nidaira	21	6	21

==== Section 4 ====
First round
(Chinese Taipei) Lin H-t	21	12	10
PFQ	(Chinese Taipei) Chiang Y-l	12	21	21
PFQ	(Chinese Taipei) Hung Y-t	9	9
7	(Japan) S Kawakami	21	21
(Malaysia) Goh J W	21	21
(India) T Hemanth	14	10
Q4	(Indonesia) K A C Dewi	21	21
PFQ	(Chinese Taipei) Chen S-y	11	13

Second round
PFQ	(Chinese Taipei) Chiang Y-l	12	14
7	(Japan) S Kawakami	21	21
(Malaysia) Goh J W	21	21
Q4	(Indonesia) K A C Dewi	11	17

Quarter-finals
7	(Japan) S Kawakami	21	12	21
(Malaysia) Goh J W	9	21	16

== Men's doubles ==
=== Seeds ===
1. (Chinese Taipei) Lee Yang / Wang Chi-lin (final)
2. (Indonesia) Leo Rolly Carnando / Daniel Marthin (withdrew)
3. (Chinese Taipei) Lu Ching-yao / Yang Po-han (second round)
4. (Chinese Taipei) Lee Jhe-huei / Yang Po-hsuan (withdrew)
5. (India) Arjun M. R. / Dhruv Kapila (second round)
6. (Malaysia) Man Wei Chong / Tee Kai Wun (champions)
7. (India) Krishna Prasad Garaga / Vishnuvardhan Goud Panjala (first round)
8. (Malaysia) Goh V Shem / Lim Khim Wah (second round)

=== Finals ===
Semi-finals
1	(Chinese Taipei) Lee Yang (Chinese Taipei) Wang Chi-lin	21	21
(Malaysia) Boon Xin Yuan (Malaysia) Wong Tien Ci	10	14
6	(Malaysia) Man Wei Chong (Malaysia) Tee Kai Wun	21	22
(Chinese Taipei) Su Ching-heng (Chinese Taipei) Ye Hong-wei	13	20

Final
1	(Chinese Taipei) Lee Yang (Chinese Taipei) Wang Chi-lin	18	21	18
6	(Malaysia) Man Wei Chong (Malaysia) Tee Kai Wun	21	11	21

=== Top half ===
==== Section 1 ====
First round
1	(Chinese Taipei) Lee Y (Chinese Taipei) Wang C-l	19	22	21
(Chinese Taipei) Lee F-c (Chinese Taipei) Lee F-j	21	20	16
(India) I Bhatnagar (India) K. S Praneeth	26	14	21
(Thailand) C Charoenkitamorn (Thailand) N Yordphaisong	24	21	19
8	(Malaysia) Goh V S (Malaysia) Lim K W	13	21	21
(Chinese Taipei) Chiu H-c (Chinese Taipei) Yang M-t	21	19	12
PFQ	(Hong Kong) Yeung M N (Hong Kong) Yeung S C	17	22
(Chinese Taipei) Lee C-h (Chinese Taipei) Lin Y-s	21	24

Second round
1	(Chinese Taipei) Lee Y (Chinese Taipei) Wang C-l	21	21	21
(India) I Bhatnagar (India) K. S Praneeth	19	23	9
8	(Malaysia) Goh V S (Malaysia) Lim K W	18	21	18
(Chinese Taipei) Lee C-h (Chinese Taipei) Lin Y-s	21	17	21

Quarter-finals
1	(Chinese Taipei) Lee Y (Chinese Taipei) Wang C-l	21	21
(Chinese Taipei) Lee C-h (Chinese Taipei) Lin Y-s	16	13

==== Section 2 ====
First round
3	(Chinese Taipei) Lu C-y (Chinese Taipei) Yang P-ha	21	21
Q1	(Chinese Taipei) Chen C-k (Chinese Taipei) Chen S-f	10	12
(Malaysia) Boon X Y (Malaysia) Wong T C	21	21
(United States) V Chiu (United States) J Yuan	18	17
7	(India) K P Garaga (India) V G Panjala	23	18	14
(Hong Kong) Law C H (Hong Kong) Lee C H	21	21	21
(India) P. S. Ravikrishna (India) S P Udayakumar	14	10
(Chinese Taipei) Lin S-k (Chinese Taipei) Tseng M-h	21	21

Second round
3	(Chinese Taipei) Lu C-y (Chinese Taipei) Yang P-ha	16	11
(Malaysia) Boon X Y (Malaysia) Wong T C	21	21
(Hong Kong) Law C H (Hong Kong) Lee C H	21	21
(Chinese Taipei) Lin S-k (Chinese Taipei) Tseng M-h	19	11

Quarter-finals
(Malaysia) Boon X Y (Malaysia) Wong T C	21	11	22
(Hong Kong) Law C H (Hong Kong) Lee C H	12	21	20

=== Bottom half ===
==== Section 3 ====
First round
PFQ	(Canada) Kan C Y (Chinese Taipei) Liao C-h	12	11
Q4	(Chinese Taipei) Cheng K-w (Chinese Taipei) Liu K-h	21	21
Q3	(Chinese Taipei) Chang K-c (Chinese Taipei) Po L-w	19	21	12
6	(Malaysia) Man W C (Malaysia) Tee K W	21	11	21
(Chinese Taipei) Liao M-c (Chinese Taipei) Yang C-h	21	21
(Norway) T Flåtten (Norway) V Rikheim	16	15
(Chinese Taipei) Chen Z-r (Chinese Taipei) Lu C	21	21
PFQ	(Chinese Taipei) Lu M-c (Chinese Taipei) Tang K-w	9	12

Second round
Q4	(Chinese Taipei) Cheng K-w (Chinese Taipei) Liu K-h	20	18
6	(Malaysia) Man W C (Malaysia) Tee K W	22	21
(Chinese Taipei) Liao M-c (Chinese Taipei) Yang C-h	21	21
(Chinese Taipei) Chen Z-r (Chinese Taipei) Lu C	12	16

Quarter-finals
6	(Malaysia) Man W C (Malaysia) Tee K W	21	21
(Chinese Taipei) Liao M-c (Chinese Taipei) Yang C-h	14	19

==== Section 4 ====
First round
(Chinese Taipei) Su C-h (Chinese Taipei) Ye H-w	22	21
PFQ	(Chinese Taipei) Hung T-w (Chinese Taipei) Lu C-w	20	13
(Chinese Taipei) Lin Y-c (Chinese Taipei) Su L-w	19	23	12
5	(India) Arjun M. R. (India) D Kapila	21	21	21
Q2	(Chinese Taipei) Chiang C-w (Chinese Taipei) Wu H-y	17	18
(Chinese Taipei) Wei C-w (Chinese Taipei) Wu G-x	21	21
(Japan) H Okamura (Japan) M Onodera	21	21
PFQ	(Chinese Taipei) Chien M-y (United States) P Smith	15	15

Second round
(Chinese Taipei) Su C-h (Chinese Taipei) Ye H-w	21	21
5	(India) Arjun M. R. (India) D Kapila	17	15
(Chinese Taipei) Wei C-w (Chinese Taipei) Wu G-x	12	19
(Japan) H Okamura (Japan) M Onodera	21	21

Quarter-finals
(Chinese Taipei) Su C-h (Chinese Taipei) Ye H-w	12	21	21
(Japan) H Okamura (Japan) M Onodera	21	15	12

== Women's doubles ==
=== Seeds ===
1. (Malaysia) Anna Cheong / Teoh Mei Xing (withdrew)
2. (Hong Kong) Yeung Nga Ting / Yeung Pui Lam (withdrew)
3. (Chinese Taipei) Chang Ching-hui / Yang Ching-tun (second round)
4. (Indonesia) Febriana Dwipuji Kusuma / Amalia Cahaya Pratiwi (withdrew)
5. (Indonesia) Apriyani Rahayu / Siti Fadia Silva Ramadhanti (withdrew)
6. (Hong Kong) Ng Tsz Yau / Tsang Hiu Yan (champions)
7. (Japan) Sayaka Hobara / Hinata Suzuki (semi-finals)
8. (Malaysia) Low Yeen Yuan / Valeree Siow (withdrew)

=== Finals ===
Semi-finals
7	(Japan) Sayaka Hobara (Japan) Hinata Suzuki	7	21	15
(Japan) Rui Hirokami (Japan) Yuna Kato	21	10	21
(Chinese Taipei) Sung Shuo-yun (Chinese Taipei) Yu Chien-hui	19	15
6	(Hong Kong) Ng Tsz Yau (Hong Kong) Tsang Hiu Yan	21	21

Final
(Japan) Rui Hirokami (Japan) Yuna Kato	15	21	19
6	(Hong Kong) Ng Tsz Yau (Hong Kong) Tsang Hiu Yan	21	18	21

=== Top half ===
==== Section 1 ====
First round
PFQ	(Chinese Taipei) Chen H-y (Chinese Taipei) Du Y-c
(Chinese Taipei) Hsieh P-s (Chinese Taipei) Tseng Y-c	w	/	o
(Chinese Taipei) Lee C-h (Chinese Taipei) Teng C-h	w	/	o
Q2
7	(Japan) S Hobara (Japan) H Suzuki	12	21	21
(Chinese Taipei) Lee C-c (Chinese Taipei) Wang Y-z	21	9	17
(Chinese Taipei) Liang T-y (Chinese Taipei) Wu T-j	21	20	21
(Chinese Taipei) Jiang Y-h (Chinese Taipei) Tai W-l	15	22	12

Second round
(Chinese Taipei) Hsieh P-s (Chinese Taipei) Tseng Y-c	14	21	14
(Chinese Taipei) Lee C-h (Chinese Taipei) Teng C-h	21	19	21
7	(Japan) S Hobara (Japan) H Suzuki	21	18	21
(Chinese Taipei) Liang T-y (Chinese Taipei) Wu T-j	18	21	16

Quarter-finals
(Chinese Taipei) Lee C-h (Chinese Taipei) Teng C-h	21	17	14
7	(Japan) S Hobara (Japan) H Suzuki	12	21	21

==== Section 2 ====
First round
PFQ	(Chinese Taipei) Hu L-f (Chinese Taipei) Lin X-m	21	21
PFQ	(Chinese Taipei) Hung H-e (Chinese Taipei) Hung Y-n	16	17
(Japan) R Hirokami (Japan) Y Kato	26	21
PFQ	(Chinese Taipei) Lee Y-h (Chinese Taipei) Liu X-z	24	12
PFQ	(Chinese Taipei) Lin C-c (Chinese Taipei) Wu M-c	12	9
PFQ	(Chinese Taipei) Chung K-y (Chinese Taipei) Hung E-t	21	21
(Chinese Taipei) Hsu Y-c (Chinese Taipei) Lin W-c	21	21
PFQ	(Chinese Taipei) Jheng Y-c (Chinese Taipei) Lu H-a	15	19

Second round
PFQ	(Chinese Taipei) Hu L-f (Chinese Taipei) Lin X-m	16	10
(Japan) R Hirokami (Japan) Y Kato	21	21
PFQ	(Chinese Taipei) Chung K-y (Chinese Taipei) Hung E-t	18	9
(Chinese Taipei) Hsu Y-c (Chinese Taipei) Lin W-c	21	21

Quarter-finals
(Japan) R Hirokami (Japan) Y Kato	21	12	21
(Chinese Taipei) Hsu Y-c (Chinese Taipei) Lin W-c	16	21	17

=== Bottom half ===
==== Section 3 ====
First round
(Chinese Taipei) Cheng Y-p (Chinese Taipei) Sun W-p	21	15	21
(United States) F Corbett (United States) A Lee	13	21	17
Q3
PFQ	(Chinese Taipei) Hsu Y-h (Chinese Taipei) Sung Y-h	w	/	o
(Chinese Taipei) Sung S-y (Chinese Taipei) Yu C-h	21	21
(Chinese Taipei) Li Z-q (Chinese Taipei) Yang Y-h	10	10
Q4
3	(Chinese Taipei) Chang C-h (Chinese Taipei) Yang C-t	w	/	o

Second round
(Chinese Taipei) Cheng Y-p (Chinese Taipei) Sun W-p	19	25	14
PFQ	(Chinese Taipei) Hsu Y-h (Chinese Taipei) Sung Y-h	21	23	21
(Chinese Taipei) Sung S-y (Chinese Taipei) Yu C-h	21	21	21
3	(Chinese Taipei) Chang C-h (Chinese Taipei) Yang C-t	23	9	16

Quarter-finals
(Chinese Taipei) Hsu Y-h (Chinese Taipei) Sung Y-h	18	12
(Chinese Taipei) Sung S-y (Chinese Taipei) Yu C-h	21	21

==== Section 4 ====
First round
(Chinese Taipei) Chen S-y (Chinese Taipei) Peng L-t	9	21	18
(Chinese Taipei) Kuo Y-w (Chinese Taipei) Wang Y-q	21	13	21
(Hong Kong) Leung S L (Hong Kong) Yuen S Y	23	14
6	(Hong Kong) Ng T Y (Hong Kong) Tsang H Y	25	21
PFQ	(Chinese Taipei) Chiu P-c (Chinese Taipei) Tung C-t	14	22	11
(India) T Crasto (India) S Mishra	21	20	21
Q1	(Chinese Taipei) Lin J-y (Chinese Taipei) Lin Y-h	22	9	21
PFQ	(Chinese Taipei) Lin S-y (Chinese Taipei) Yang Y-c	20	21	14

Second round
(Chinese Taipei) Kuo Y-w (Chinese Taipei) Wang Y-q	15	14
6	(Hong Kong) Ng T Y (Hong Kong) Tsang H Y	21	21
(India) T Crasto (India) S Mishra	21	21
Q1	(Chinese Taipei) Lin J-y (Chinese Taipei) Lin Y-h	14	8

Quarter-finals
6	(Hong Kong) Ng T Y (Hong Kong) Tsang H Y	21	20	21
(India) T Crasto (India) S Mishra	16	22	18

== Mixed doubles ==
=== Seeds ===
1. (Malaysia) Goh Soon Huat / Shevon Jemie Lai (withdrew)
2. (Indonesia) Rinov Rivaldy / Pitha Haningtyas Mentari (withdrew)
3. (Chinese Taipei) Lee Jhe-huei / Hsu Ya-ching (second round)
4. (Chinese Taipei) Yang Po-hsuan / Hu Ling-fang (withdrew)
5. (Indonesia) Rehan Naufal Kusharjanto / Lisa Ayu Kusumawati (withdrew)
6. (India) Ishaan Bhatnagar / Tanisha Crasto (quarter-finals)
7. (Egypt) Adham Hatem Elgamal / Doha Hany (withdrew)
8. (Indonesia) Zachariah Josiahno Sumanti / Hediana Julimarbela (withdrew)

=== Finals ===
Semi-finals
Q1	(Chinese Taipei) Chang Ko-chi (Chinese Taipei) Lee Chih-chen	15	21
(Thailand) Ruttanapak Oupthong (Thailand) Chasinee Korepap	21	23
PFQ	(Malaysia) Hoo Pang Ron (Malaysia) Toh Ee Wei	17	21	12
(Hong Kong) Lee Chun Hei (Hong Kong) Ng Tsz Yau	21	17	21

Final
(Thailand) Ruttanapak Oupthong (Thailand) Chasinee Korepap	8	9
(Hong Kong) Lee Chun Hei (Hong Kong) Ng Tsz Yau	21	21

=== Top half ===
==== Section 1 ====
First round
PFQ	(Chinese Taipei) Po L-w (Chinese Taipei) Chang C-h	18	23	19
(Hong Kong) Law C H (Hong Kong) Yeung N T	21	21	21
(Chinese Taipei) Yang M-t (Chinese Taipei) Yang Y-h	14	19
Q1	(Chinese Taipei) Chang K-c (Chinese Taipei) Lee C-c	21	21
PFQ	(Chinese Taipei) Chiu H-c (Chinese Taipei) Lin X-m	19	21	19
(Japan) Y Nishikawa (Japan) S Ozaki	21	17	21
(Hong Kong) Yeung S C (Hong Kong) Fan K Y	21	21
Q3	(Chinese Taipei) Su C-h (Chinese Taipei) Lin C-c	14	12

Second round
(Hong Kong) Law C H (Hong Kong) Yeung N T	14	21	16
Q1	(Chinese Taipei) Chang K-c (Chinese Taipei) Lee C-c	21	19	21
(Japan) Y Nishikawa (Japan) S Ozaki	8	18
(Hong Kong) Yeung S C (Hong Kong) Fan K Y	21	21

Quarter-finals
Q1	(Chinese Taipei) Chang K-c (Chinese Taipei) Lee C-c	21	21
(Hong Kong) Yeung S C (Hong Kong) Fan K Y	16	14

==== Section 2 ====
First round
PFQ	(Chinese Taipei) Liao C-p (Chinese Taipei) Liu C-y	15	15
(Japan) H Midorikawa (Japan) N Saito	21	21
(Thailand) R Makkasasithorn (Thailand) J Sudjaipraparat	16	21
(Chinese Taipei) Tseng M-h (Chinese Taipei) Hsieh P-s	21	23
PFQ	(Chinese Taipei) Hung T-z (Chinese Taipei) Tseng Y-c	17	12
(Thailand) R Oupthong (Thailand) C Korepap	21	21
(Chinese Taipei) Lu M-c (Chinese Taipei) Wu T-j	21	21
(United States) J Yuan (United States) A Lee	17	17

Second round
(Japan) H Midorikawa (Japan) N Saito	21	21
(Chinese Taipei) Tseng M-h (Chinese Taipei) Hsieh P-s	11	6
(Thailand) R Oupthong (Thailand) C Korepap	21	21
(Chinese Taipei) Lu M-c (Chinese Taipei) Wu T-j	16	14

Quarter-finals
(Japan) H Midorikawa (Japan) N Saito	21	13	14
(Thailand) R Oupthong (Thailand) C Korepap	17	21	21

=== Bottom half ===
==== Section 3 ====
First round
(Chinese Taipei) Cheng K-w (Chinese Taipei) Wang Y-q	22	21
Q2	(Chinese Taipei) Yang C-h (Chinese Taipei) Hsu Y-h	20	13
(Israel) M Zilberman (Israel) S Zilberman	15	8
6	(India) I Bhatnagar (India) T Crasto	21	21
PFQ	(Malaysia) Hoo P R (Malaysia) Toh E W	27	21
(Chinese Taipei) Chen X-y (Chinese Taipei) Yang C-t	25	13
(United States) T Tan (United States) E Shi	8	12
3	(Chinese Taipei) Lee J-h (Chinese Taipei) Hsu Y-c	21	21

Second round
(Chinese Taipei) Cheng K-w (Chinese Taipei) Wang Y-q	14	17
6	(India) I Bhatnagar (India) T Crasto	21	21
PFQ	(Malaysia) Hoo P R (Malaysia) Toh E W	21	23	21
3	(Chinese Taipei) Lee J-h (Chinese Taipei) Hsu Y-c	23	21	14

Quarter-finals
6	(India) I Bhatnagar (India) T Crasto	19	12
PFQ	(Malaysia) Hoo P R (Malaysia) Toh E W	21	21

==== Section 4 ====
First round
(Chinese Taipei) Lee F-j (Chinese Taipei) Sung S-y	13	16
(Hong Kong) Lee C H (Hong Kong) Ng T Y	21	21
(United States) V Chiu (United States) J Gai	21	21
PFQ	(Chinese Taipei) Lee F-c (Chinese Taipei) Sun W-p	16	17
(Chinese Taipei) Ye H-w (Chinese Taipei) Lee C-h	21	22
PFQ	(Chinese Taipei) Lin C-y (Chinese Taipei) Liu X-z	12	20
Q4	(Chinese Taipei) Lee C-h (Chinese Taipei) Kuo Y-w	15	15
PFQ	(Chinese Taipei) Lin Y-s (Chinese Taipei) Lin W-c	21	21

Second round
(Hong Kong) Lee C H (Hong Kong) Ng T Y	21	21
(United States) V Chiu (United States) J Gai	14	14
(Chinese Taipei) Ye H-w (Chinese Taipei) Lee C-h	21	21
PFQ	(Chinese Taipei) Lin Y-s (Chinese Taipei) Lin W-c	17	17

Quarter-finals
(Hong Kong) Lee C H (Hong Kong) Ng T Y	12	21	21
(Chinese Taipei) Ye H-w (Chinese Taipei) Lee C-h	21	13	18

Preceded by 2022 Singapore Open	BWF World Tour; 2022 BWF season	Succeeded by 2022 Japan Open
