= Yuna Kato =

Japanese badminton player (born 2002)

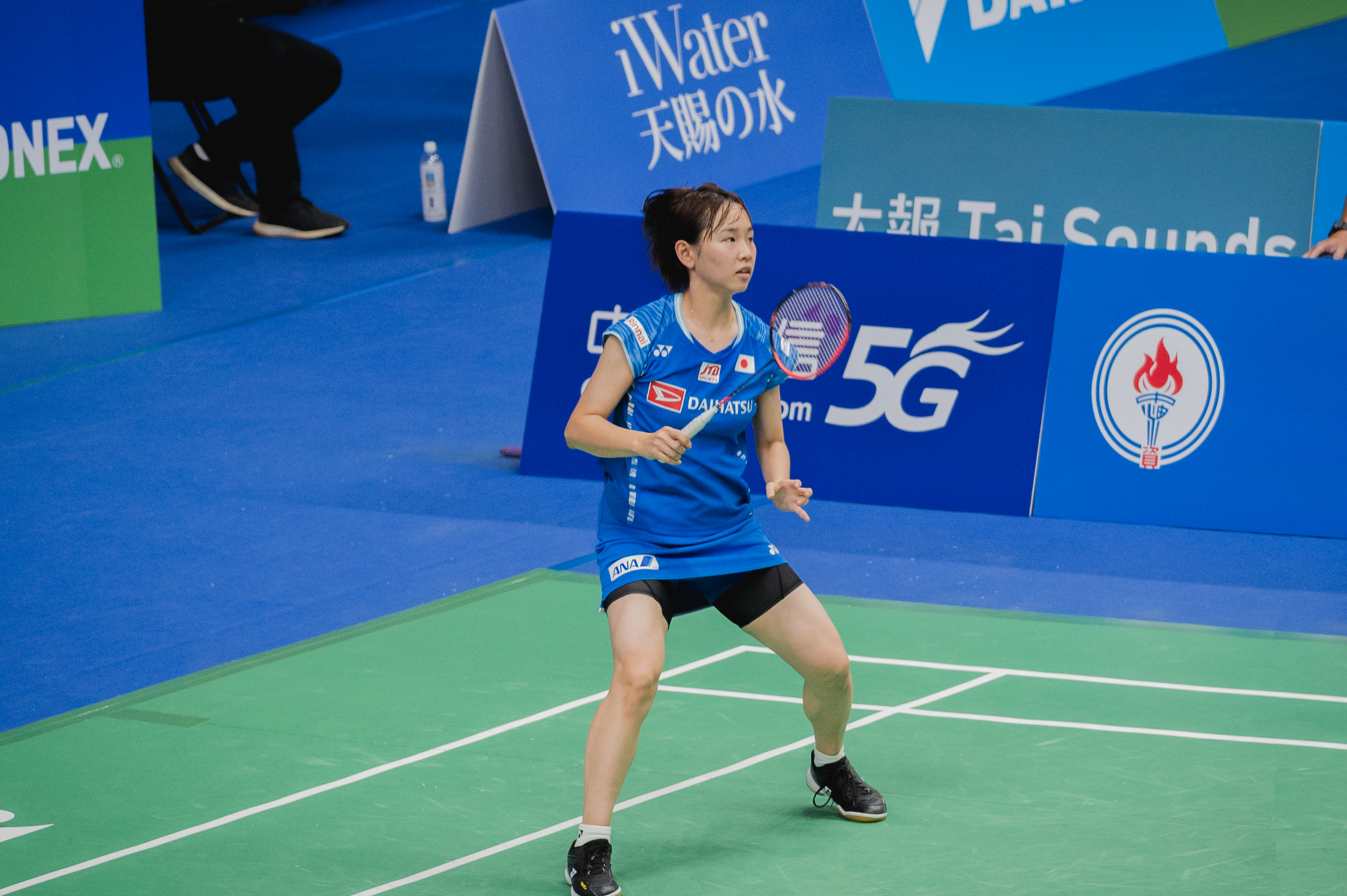
- Kato at the 2022 Taipei Open

Personal information
- Native name: 加藤 佑奈
- Born: 26 June 2002 (age 24) Gifu, Japan
- Height: 1.66 m (5 ft 5 in)

Sport
- Country: Japan
- Sport: Badminton

Women's doubles
- Highest ranking: 18 (WD with Rui Hirokami) (23 May 2023)
- BWF profile
Medal record
Women's badminton
Representing Japan
Asia Team Championships
Bronze medal – third place	2022 Selangor	Women's team

Yuna Kato (加藤 佑奈, Katō Yūna; born 26 June 2002) is a Japanese badminton player who competes in women's doubles. She is a former member of the Japanese national team and plays for the Kumamoto Saishunkan badminton team. Kato reached a career-high world ranking of No. 18 alongside her former partner, Rui Hirokami. She won her first BWF World Tour title at the 2022 Indonesia Masters Super 100. She was also a runner-up in three Super 300 events: 2022 Taipei Open, 2023 Korea Masters and 2024 Orléans Masters. She was part of the Japanese team that secured a bronze medal at the 2022 Asia Team Championships.

== Career ==
=== 2022: First World Tour title and world No. 25 ranking ===
In 2022, Yuna Kato partnered with Rui Hirokami in women's doubles. On the BWF World Tour, they were runners-up at two tournaments: the Taipei Open (Super 300), where they lost to Ng Tsz Yau and Tsang Hiu Yan of Hong Kong, and the Canada Open (Super 100), where they were defeated by fellow Japanese pair Rena Miyaura and Ayako Sakuramoto. Kato and Hirokami won their first BWF World Tour title at the Indonesia Masters Super 100, defeating Miyaura and Sakuramoto in the final. The pair also won two International Challenge titles: the Mexican International and the Belgian International. Kato was part of the Japanese team that won a bronze medal at the Asia Team Championships in Selangor. Starting the year unranked, their performances led to a significant rise in their world ranking, reaching World No. 25 by 26 December 2022.

=== 2026 ===
During the 2026 season, Kato competed in women's doubles alongside partner Miki Kanehiro. The pair achieved consistent results on the International Challenge circuit, reaching four finals throughout the year. Their first final appearance of the season occurred in March at the Vietnam International, where they finished as runners-up to Gronya Somerville and Josephine Wu. In July, Kato and Kanehiro reached the final of the Northern Marianas Open, again securing a runner-up position. In August, the duo reached the final of the inaugural Philippine International, where they were defeated by the Indian pair Treesa Jolly and Gayatri Gopichand. Additionally, they were runners-up at the Malaysia International, losing the final to fellow Japanese players Mikoto Aiso and Momoha Niimi.

== Achievements ==
=== BWF World Tour (1 title, 4 runners-up) ===
The BWF World Tour, which was announced on 19 March 2017 and implemented in 2018, is a series of elite badminton tournaments sanctioned by the Badminton World Federation (BWF). The BWF World Tour is divided into levels of World Tour Finals, Super 1000, Super 750, Super 500, Super 300 (part of the HSBC World Tour), and the BWF Tour Super 100.

Women's doubles
Year	Tournament	Level	Partner	Opponent	Score	Result	Ref.
2022	Taipei Open	Super 300	(Japan) Rui Hirokami	(Hong Kong) Ng Tsz Yau (Hong Kong) Tsang Hiu Yan	15–21, 21–18, 19–21	(silver) Runner-up	
2022	Canada Open	Super 100	(Japan) Rui Hirokami	(Japan) Rena Miyaura (Japan) Ayako Sakuramoto	13–21, 8–21	(silver) Runner-up	
2022	Indonesia Masters	Super 100	(Japan) Rui Hirokami	(Japan) Rena Miyaura (Japan) Ayako Sakuramoto	23–21, 21–18	(gold) Winner	
2023	Korea Masters	Super 300	(Japan) Rui Hirokami	(South Korea) Jeong Na-eun (South Korea) Kim Hye-jeong	12–21, 19–21	(silver) Runner-up	
2024	Orléans Masters	Super 300	(Japan) Rui Hirokami	(Indonesia) Meilysa Trias Puspita Sari (Indonesia) Rachel Allessya Rose	12–21, 18–21	(silver) Runner-up	

=== BWF International Challenge/Series (2 titles, 5 runners-up) ===
Women's doubles
Year	Tournament	Partner	Opponent	Score	Result	Ref.
2022	Mexican International	(Japan) Rui Hirokami	(Japan) Ayako Sakuramoto (Japan) Hinata Suzuki	15–21, 21–19, 21–17	(gold) Winner	
2022	Belgian International	(Japan) Rui Hirokami	(Chinese Taipei) Chang Ching-hui (Chinese Taipei) Yang Ching-tun	21–7, 21–15	(gold) Winner	
2025	Malaysia International	(Japan) Hina Osawa	(South Korea) Jeon Jui (South Korea) Kim Ha-na	10–15, 10–15	(silver) Runner-up	
2026	Vietnam International	(Japan) Miki Kanehiro	(Australia) Gronya Somerville (Canada) Josephine Wu	21–16, 19–21, 22–24	(silver) Runner-up	
2026	Northern Marianas Open	(Japan) Miki Kanehiro	(South Korea) Moon In-seo (South Korea) Park Seul	16–21, 21–17, 15–21	(silver) Runner-up	
2026	Philippine International	(Japan) Miki Kanehiro	(India) Treesa Jolly (India) Gayatri Gopichand	21–16, 4–21, 17–21	(silver) Runner-up	
2026	Malaysia International	(Japan) Miki Kanehiro	(Japan) Mikoto Aiso (Japan) Momoha Niimi	17–21, 15–21	(silver) Runner-up	

BWF International Challenge tournament

=== BWF Junior International (1 title) ===
Girls' doubles
Year	Tournament	Partner	Opponent	Score	Result	Ref.
2020	German Junior	(Japan) Rui Hirokami	(South Korea) Lee So-yul (South Korea) Yoo A-yeon	21–13, 21–14	(gold) Winner	

BWF Junior International Grand Prix tournament

== Record against selected opponents ==
Record against year-end Finals finalists, World Championships semi-finalists, and Olympic quarter-finalists. Accurate as of 7 November 2026.

=== Miki Kanehiro ===
Players	M	W	L	Diff.
(India) Treesa Jolly & Gayatri Gopichand	1	0	1	–1

=== Rui Hirokami ===
Players	M	W	L	Diff.
(China) Liu Shengshu & Tan Ning	2	0	2	–2
(China) Zhang Shuxian & Zheng Yu	2	0	2	–2
(India) Treesa Jolly & Gayatri Gopichand	1	1	0	+1
(Japan) Yuki Fukushima & Sayaka Hirota	1	0	1	–1
(Japan) Mayu Matsumoto & Wakana Nagahara	2	0	2	–2

Players	M	W	L	Diff.
(Malaysia) Pearly Tan & Thinaah Muralitharan	2	0	2	–2
(South Korea) Baek Ha-na & Lee So-hee	2	0	2	–2
(South Korea) Kim So-yeong & Kong Hee-yong	1	0	1	–1
(Thailand) Benyapa Aimsaard & Nuntakarn Aimsaard	1	0	1	–1
