= Rena Miyaura =

Japanese badminton player (born 1995)

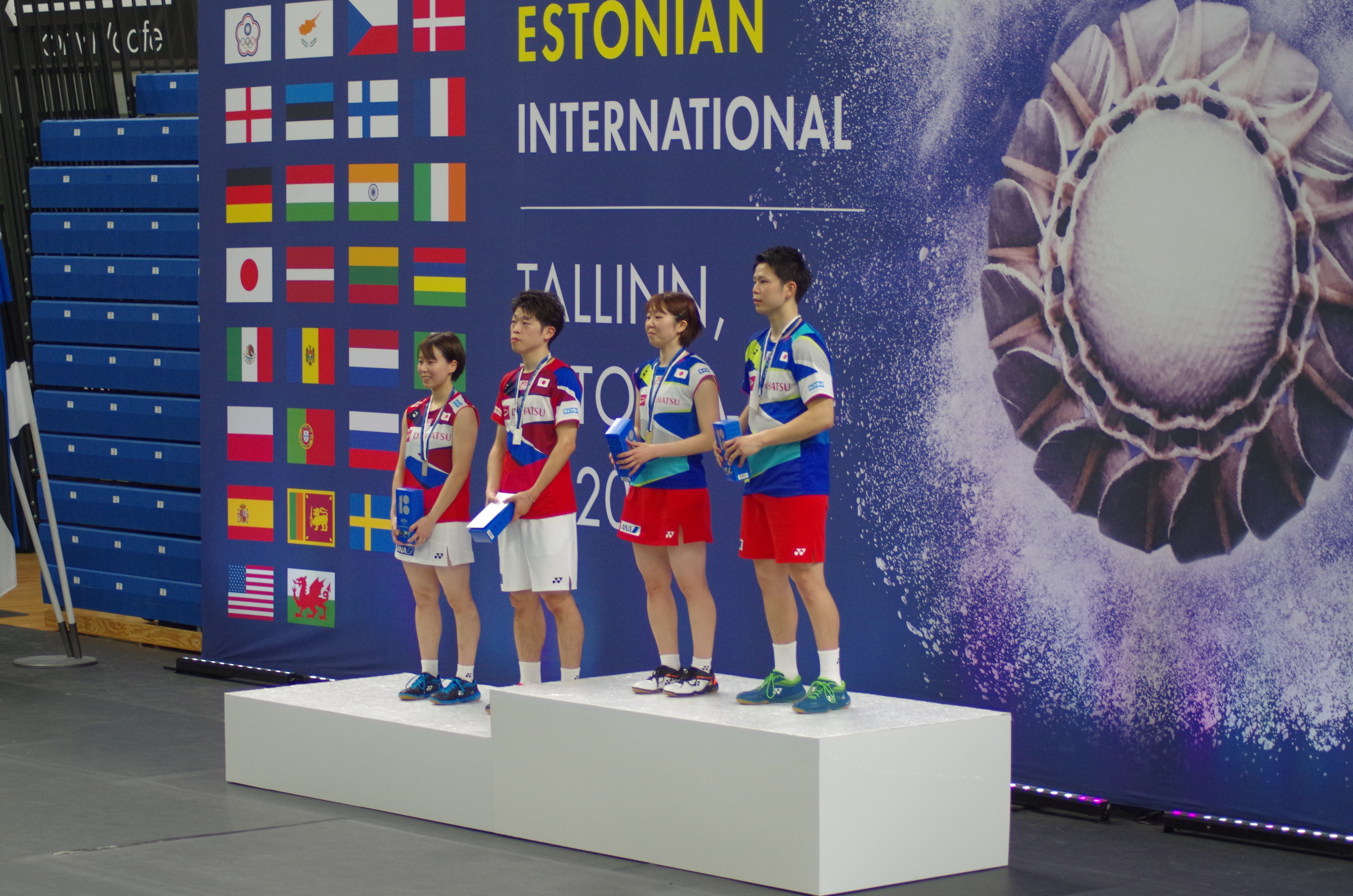

Personal information
- Born: July 25, 1995 (age 31) Saitama Prefecture, Japan
- Height: 1.60 m (5 ft 3 in)
- Weight: 53 kg (117 lb)

Sport
- Country: Japan
- Sport: Badminton
- Retired: 6 June 2024

Women's doubles
- Highest ranking: 11 (with Ayako Sakuramoto, 23 January 2024)
- BWF profile
Medal record
Women's badminton
Representing Japan
Uber Cup
Bronze medal – third place	2024 Chengdu	Women's team
Asian Team Championships
Bronze medal – third place	2024 Selangor	Women's team
Summer Universiade
Silver medal – second place	2017 Taipei	Mixed team

Rena Miyaura (宮浦 玲奈, Miyaura Rena; born July 25, 1995) is a Japanese badminton player. Miyaura won her first World Tour title in 2022. She announced her retirement in June 2024.

== Career ==
She won her first World Tour title at the 2022 Canada Open partnering with Ayako Sakuramoto, defeating compatriots Rui Hirokami and Yuna Kato in straight games in the final.

Rena Miyaura announced her retirement on June 6, 2024. The 2024 Uber Cup was her last tournament.

== Achievements ==
=== BWF World Tour (3 titles, 1 runner-up) ===
The BWF World Tour, which was announced on 19 March 2017 and implemented in 2018, is a series of elite badminton tournaments sanctioned by the Badminton World Federation (BWF). The BWF World Tour is divided into levels of World Tour Finals, Super 1000, Super 750, Super 500, Super 300, and the BWF Tour Super 100.

Women's doubles
Year	Tournament	Level	Partner	Opponent	Score	Result	Ref.
2022	Canada Open	Super 100	(Japan) Ayako Sakuramoto	(Japan) Rui Hirokami (Japan) Yuna Kato	21–13, 21–8	(gold) Winner	
2022	Indonesia Masters	Super 100	(Japan) Ayako Sakuramoto	(Japan) Rui Hirokami (Japan) Yuna Kato	21–23, 18–21	(silver) Runner-up	
2023	Swiss Open	Super 300	(Japan) Ayako Sakuramoto	(Japan) Yuki Fukushima (Japan) Sayaka Hirota	Walkover	(gold) Winner	
2023	Orléans Masters	Super 300	(Japan) Ayako Sakuramoto	(China) Liu Shengshu (China) Tan Ning	21–19, 16–21, 21–12	(gold) Winner	

=== BWF International Challenge/Series (3 titles, 1 runner-up) ===
Women's doubles
Year	Tournament	Partner	Opponent	Score	Result	Ref.
2020	Estonian International	(Japan) Saori Ozaki	(France) Vimala Hériau (France) Margot Lambert	21–18, 21–18	(gold) Winner	
2020	Jamaica International	(Japan) Sayaka Hobara	(Peru) Daniela Macías (Peru) Dánica Nishimura	21–3, 21–7	(gold) Winner	

Mixed doubles
Year	Tournament	Partner	Opponent	Score	Result	Ref.
2018	Sydney International	(Japan) Tadayuki Urai	(Singapore) Danny Bawa Chrisnanta (Singapore) Crystal Wong	21–16, 21–17	(gold) Winner	
2020	Estonian International	(Japan) Tadayuki Urai	(Japan) Yujiro Nishikawa (Japan) Saori Ozaki	18–21, 14–21	(silver) Runner-up	

BWF International Series tournament
