= Ayato Endo =

Japanese badminton player (born 2000)

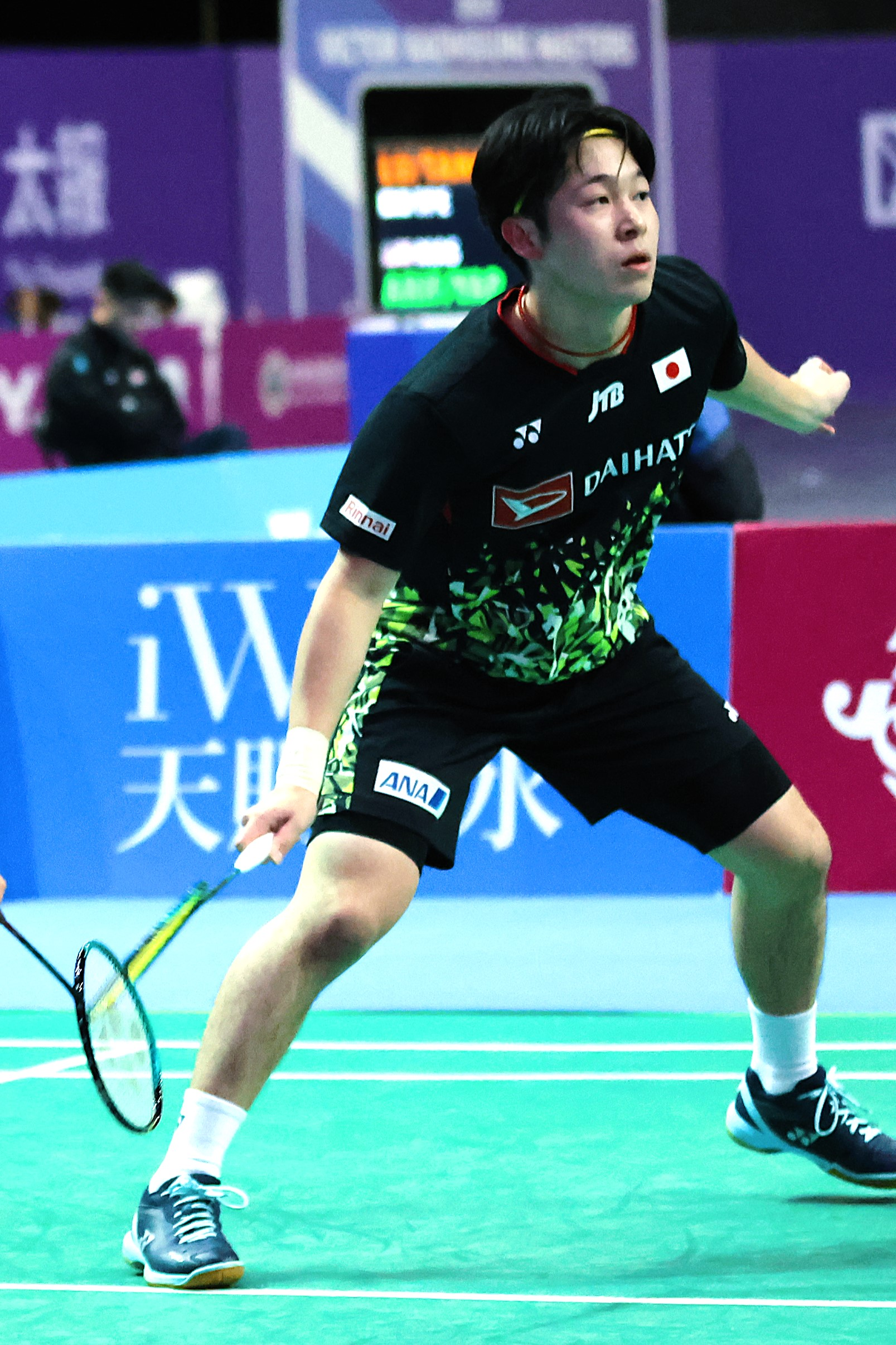
- Endo at the 2023 Kaohsiung Masters

Personal information
- Born: 19 June 2000 (age 26) Ōme, Tokyo, Japan
- Height: 1.67 m (5 ft 6 in)

Sport
- Country: Japan
- Sport: Badminton
- Handedness: Right

Men's doubles
- Career record: 47 wins, 29 losses (61.84%)
- Highest ranking: 25 (with Yuta Takei, 16 May 2023)
- BWF profile

Ayato Endo (遠藤 彩斗, Endō Ayato; born 19 June 2000) is a Japanese badminton player who specializes in men's doubles. He is a member of the NTT East badminton team and has a long-standing partnership with Yuta Takei. With Takei, Endo won his first BWF World Tour title at the 2022 Canada Open. In 2022 while still a university student, the pair also secured three titles on the BWF International Challenge/Series circuit. Endo and Takei achieved a career-high world ranking of No. 25 on 16 May 2023.

== Career ==
=== Junior career ===
Ayato Endo began playing badminton in the second grade of elementary school, joining a local junior team in Tokyo. He attended Saitama Sakae Junior and Senior High School, having begun his partnership with Yuta Takei in the fourth grade of elementary school. During their junior career, Endo and Takei won the national title at the Junior High School Badminton Tournament. In 2018, they were the runners-up in doubles at both the National High School Championships (Inter-High) and the National High School Selection tournament.

=== University career ===
Endo attended Meiji University, where he studied in the School of Political Science and Economics and continued his partnership with Takei. While representing the university, he won the men's doubles title at the All Japan Inter-Collegiate Championships in both 2021 and 2022. He was also a member of the Meiji University men's team that captured its first-ever team title at the 2021 championships. At the 2021 All Japan Championships, he and Takei earned a third-place finish in men's doubles.

In 2022, while still a university student, Endo was selected for the Japanese B national team and began competing more widely on the international circuit. Representing Japan at the Asia Team Championships, the then-world No. 857 pair defeated the world No. 7 and Olympic bronze medalists Aaron Chia and Soh Wooi Yik. That year, Endo and Takei secured four international titles: their first BWF World Tour title at the Super 100 Canada Open, and three BWF International Challenge/Series tournaments at the Santo Domingo Open, Mongolia International, and Irish Open. They were also runners-up at the Norwegian International.

=== Professional career ===
Endo joined the NTT East badminton team on 1 April 2023, after graduating from university. In their first year as professionals, Endo and Takei competed regularly on the World Tour, participating in top-tier events including three Super 1000 tournaments: the Indonesia Open, China Open, and Japan Open. That year, they also made their Asian Championships debut, reaching the second round.

== Achievements ==
=== BWF World Tour (1 title) ===
The BWF World Tour, which was announced on 19 March 2017 and implemented in 2018, is a series of elite badminton tournaments sanctioned by the Badminton World Federation (BWF). The BWF World Tour is divided into levels of World Tour Finals, Super 1000, Super 750, Super 500, Super 300 (part of the HSBC World Tour), and the BWF Tour Super 100.

Men's doubles

Year	Tournament	Level	Partner	Opponent	Score	Result	Ref
2022	Canada Open	Super 100	(Japan) Yuta Takei	(Japan) Takuto Inoue (Japan) Kenya Mitsuhashi	21–15, 21–8	(gold) Winner	

=== BWF International Challenge/Series (3 titles, 1 runner-up) ===
Men's doubles

Year	Tournament	Partner	Opponent	Score	Result	Ref
2022	Santo Domingo Open	(Japan) Yuta Takei	(Cuba) Osleni Guerrero (Cuba) Leodannis Martínez	21–13, 21–9	(gold) Winner	
2022	Mongolia International	(Japan) Yuta Takei	(Japan) Takuto Inoue (Japan) Kenya Mitsuhashi	21–14, 12–21, 21–19	(gold) Winner	
2022	Norwegian International	(Japan) Yuta Takei	(Chinese Taipei) Chen Zhi-ray (Chinese Taipei) Lu Chen	19–21, 19–21	(silver) Runner-up	
2022	Irish Open	(Japan) Yuta Takei	(Denmark) Rasmus Kjær (Denmark) Frederik Søgaard	21–18, 21–12	(gold) Winner	

BWF International Challenge tournament
BWF International Series tournament

== Record against selected opponents ==
Record against year-end Finals finalists, World Championships semi-finalists, and Olympic quarter-finalists. Accurate as of 23 August 2026.

=== Yuta Takei ===
Players	M	W	L	Diff.
(China) Liang Weikeng & Wang Chang	2	0	2	–2
(Chinese Taipei) Lee Yang & Wang Chi-lin	1	0	1	–1
(Malaysia) Aaron Chia & Soh Wooi Yik	1	1	0	+1

Players	M	W	L	Diff.
(Malaysia) Goh Sze Fei & Nur Izzuddin	1	0	1	–1
(Malaysia) Ong Yew Sin & Teo Ee Yi	2	1	1	0
(South Korea) Kang Min-hyuk & Seo Seung-jae	1	1	0	+1
