= Kenya Mitsuhashi =

Japanese badminton player (born 1997)

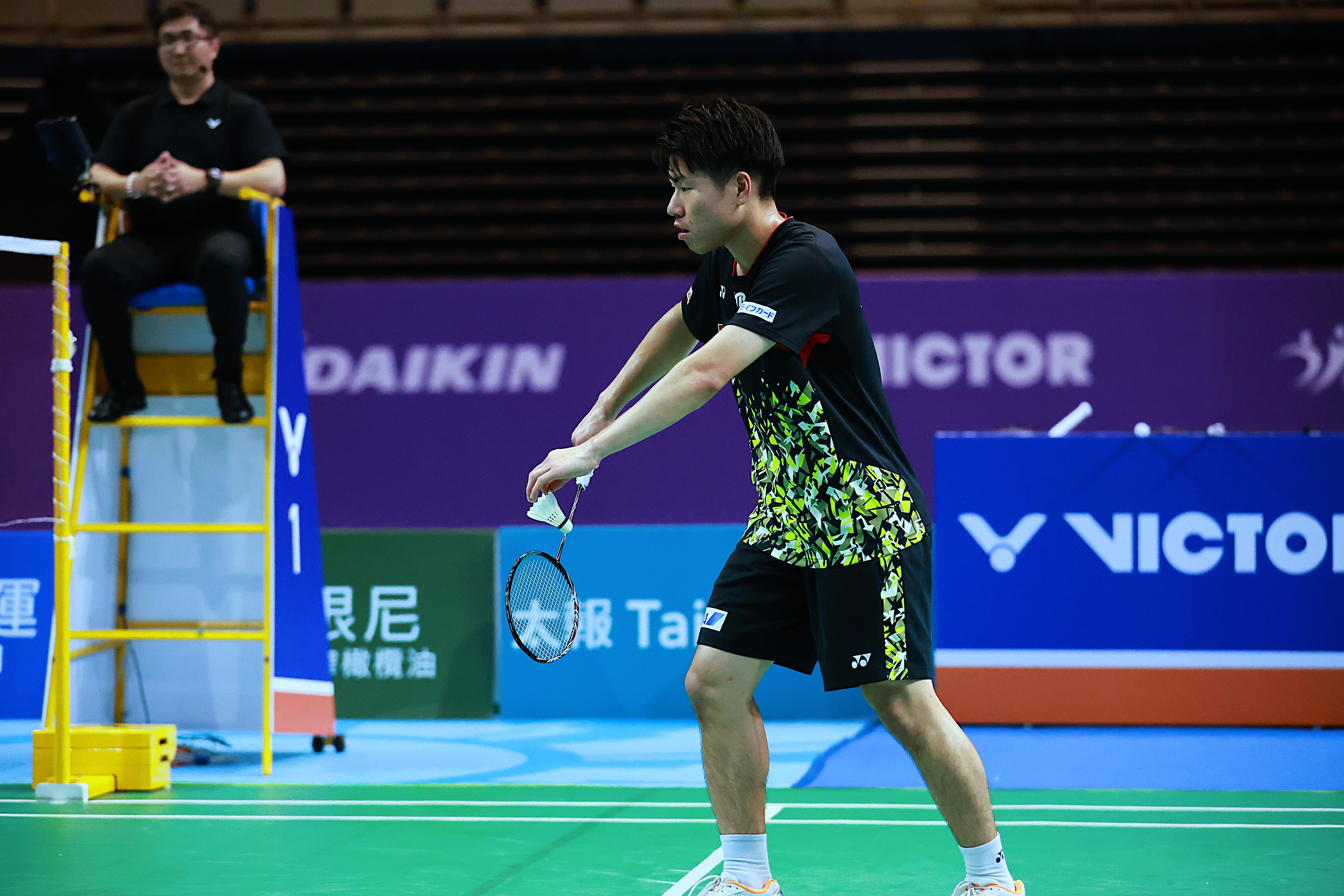
- Mitsuhashi at the 2023 Kaohsiung Masters

Personal information
- Native name: 三橋 健也
- Born: 11 July 1997 (age 29) Gunma Prefecture, Japan
- Height: 172 cm (5 ft 8 in)
- Weight: 72 kg (159 lb)

Sport
- Country: Japan
- Sport: Badminton
- Coached by: Hiroyuki Endo

Men's doubles
- Highest ranking: 18 (with Hiroki Okamura, 27 August 2024)
- Current ranking: 133 (MD with Keiichiro Matsui, 3 November 2026)
- BWF profile
Medal record
Men's badminton
Representing Japan
Asia Mixed Team Championships
Bronze medal – third place	2025 Qingdao	Mixed team
Asia Team Championships
Bronze medal – third place	2024 Selangor	Men's team
Summer Universiade
Silver medal – second place	2017 Taipei	Men's doubles
Silver medal – second place	2017 Taipei	Mixed team
World Junior Championships
Bronze medal – third place	2014 Alor Setar	Mixed team
Bronze medal – third place	2015 Lima	Boys' doubles
Asia Junior Championships
Bronze medal – third place	2014 Taipei	Boys' doubles
Bronze medal – third place	2014 Taipei	Mixed team
Bronze medal – third place	2015 Bangkok	Mixed team

Kenya Mitsuhashi (三橋 健也, Mitsuhashi Ken'ya; born 11 July 1997) is a Japanese badminton player. He was a silver medalist in the men's doubles at the 2017 Summer Universiade.

== Career ==
Mitsuhashi was selected to join national junior team competed at the 2014 Asian Junior Championships, and helped the team win the mixed team bronze medal. He also settled for another bronze medal in the boys' doubles event partnered with Yuta Watanabe. Together with the Japan juniors, he won the bronze medal at the World Junior Championships in Alor Setar, Malaysia. He captured a title at the 2014 Korea Junior Open in the boys' doubles event teamed-up with Watanabe.

Mitsuhashi started the 2015 season, by winning the boys' doubles title at the Dutch Junior tournament with Watanabe. He participated at the Asian Junior Championships, clinched the bronze medal in the mixed team events. Mitsuhashi made his first appearance in the senior international event at the Osaka International tournament. He then claimed two title at the Australian Junior International, winning the bos' singles and doubles event, and later won the boys' dobules title in the Danish Junior Cup. In November, he won the boys' doubles bronze medal at the World Junior Championships in Lima, Peru.

Mitsuhashi reached his first final in the senior event at the 2016 Austrian Open, losing the final to Marcus Ellis and Chirsi Langridge, and later also became a runner-up in the Vietnam International Challenge. After graduating from high school, he went on to Nihon University. In 2017, he participated in the Universiade (World University Championships) as a pair with Katsuki Tamate. In the semi-finals, he defeated the pair of Lee Yang and Lee Jhe-huei, to advance to the finals. In the finals, he lost to Kim Jae-hwan and Seo Seung-jae, and came in second. In 2018, he started to play in the mixed doubles with Naru Shinoya, with their best results during the year were the semi-finalists in the Osaka International, as well as quarter-finalists in the Malaysia International and Vietnam Open.

After graduating from university, Mitsuhashi joined Nippon Unisys (now BIPROGY). He formed a pair with Takuto Inoue, who is two years older than him. They achieved results such as the runner-up in the All Japan Overall Championship in 2021 and the All Japan Adult Championship in 2022. In the early 2022 season, Mitsuhashi and Inoue reached three finals in the Réunion Open, Mongolia International, and at the Canada Open.

=== 2023 ===
From 2023, Mitsuhashi was paired with Hiroki Okamura, who is one year younger than him. In September, he won the Vietnam Open, marking his first BWF World Tour title. The duo then won the Indonesia International Challenge and Indonesia Masters Super 100 in October. At the Japan Masters in November, they defeated world number 9 Mohammad Ahsan and Hendra Setiawan in straight games in the first round. In the second round, they defeated world number 6 and world champions Kang Min-hyuk and Seo Seung-jae in straight games to advance to the quarter-finals. They lost the quarter-finals match to He Jiting and Ren Xiangyu.

=== 2026 ===
Mitsuhashi formed a new men's doubles partnership with Keiichiro Matsui. In June, they made their debut at the U.S. Open, where they reached the quarterfinals.

== Achievements ==
=== Summer Universiade ===
Men's doubles
Year	Venue	Partner	Opponent	Score	Result	Ref.
2017	Taipei Gymnasium; Taipei, Taiwan	(Japan) Katsuki Tamate	(South Korea) Kim Jae-hwan (South Korea) Seo Seung-jae	12–21, 19–21	Silver	

=== World Junior Championships ===
Boys' doubles
Year	Venue	Partner	Opponent	Score	Result	Ref.
2015	Centro de Alto Rendimiento de la Videna; Lima, Peru	(Japan) Yuta Watanabe	(China) He Jiting (China) Zheng Siwei	13–21, 16–21	Bronze	

=== Asian Junior Championships ===
Boys' doubles
Year	Venue	Partner	Opponent	Score	Result	Ref.
2014	Taipei Gymnasium; Taipei, Taiwan	(Japan) Yuta Watanabe	(China) Huang Kaixiang (China) Zheng Siwei	10–21, 8–21	Bronze	

=== BWF World Tour (2 titles, 1 runner-up) ===
The BWF World Tour, which was announced on 19 March 2017 and implemented in 2018, is a series of elite badminton tournaments sanctioned by the Badminton World Federation (BWF). The BWF World Tour is divided into levels of World Tour Finals, Super 1000, Super 750, Super 500, Super 300 (part of the HSBC World Tour), and the BWF Tour Super 100.

Men's doubles
Year	Tournament	Level	Partner	Opponent	Score	Result	Ref.
2022	Canada Open	Super 100	(Japan) Takuto Inoue	(Japan) Ayato Endo (Japan) Yuta Takei	15–21, 8–21	(silver) Runner-up	
2023	Vietnam Open	Super 100	(Japan) Hiroki Okamura	(Indonesia) Hardianto (Indonesia) Ade Yusuf Santoso	21–19, 21–19	(gold) Winner	
2023 (II)	Indonesia Masters	Super 100	(Japan) Hiroki Okamura	(Malaysia) Choong Hon Jian (Malaysia) Muhammad Haikal	21–16, 21–18	(gold) Winner	

=== BWF International Challenge/Series (1 title, 4 runners-up) ===
Men's doubles
Year	Tournament	Partner	Opponent	Score	Result	Ref.
2016	Austrian Open	(Japan) Yuta Watanabe	(England) Marcus Ellis (England) Chris Langridge	14–21, 16–21	(silver) Runner-up	
2016	Vietnam International	(Japan) Yuta Watanabe	(Malaysia) Ong Yew Sin (Malaysia) Teo Ee Yi	19–21, 14–21	(silver) Runner-up	
2022	Réunion Open	(Japan) Takuto Inoue	(Japan) Shuntaro Mezaki (Japan) Haruya Nishida	21–16, 18–21, 10–21	(silver) Runner-up	
2022	Mongolia International	(Japan) Takuto Inoue	(Japan) Ayato Endo (Japan) Yuta Takei	14–21, 21–12, 19–21	(silver) Runner-up	
2023 (II)	Indonesia International	(Japan) Hiroki Okamura	(South Korea) Ki Dong-ju (South Korea) Kim Jae-hwan	20–22, 21–16, 21–8	(gold) Winner	

BWF International Challenge tournament
