= 2024 Uber Cup knockout stage =

Badminton championships

The knockout stage for the 2024 Uber Cup in Chengdu, China, began on 2 May 2024 with the quarter-finals and ended on 5 May with the final tie.

== Qualified teams ==
The top two placed teams from each of the eight groups qualified for this stage.

Group	Winners	Runners-up
A	China	India
B	Thailand	Chinese Taipei
C	Japan	Indonesia
D	South Korea	Denmark

== Bracket ==
The draw was conducted on 1 May 2024, after the last match of the group stage.

Quarter-finals
China	3
Denmark	0
Japan	3
India	0
Indonesia	3
Thailand	0
Chinese Taipei	0
South Korea	3

Semi-finals
China	3
Japan	0
Indonesia	3
South Korea	2

Final
China	3
Indonesia	0

== Quarter-finals ==
=== China vs Denmark ===
China
3
Hi-Tech Zone Sports Centre Gymnasium Court 1
2 May 2024 09:30 UTC+8

Denmark
0

			1	2	3
1	(China) (Denmark)	Chen Yufei; Line Kjærsfeldt	21; 10	21; 12
2	(China) (Denmark)	Chen Qingchen / Jia Yifan; Alexandra Bøje / Maiken Fruergaard	21; 12	21; 15
3	(China) (Denmark)	He Bingjiao; Line Christophersen	21; 16	22; 20
4	(China) (Denmark)	Liu Shengshu / Zhang Shuxian; Christine Busch / Amalie Magelund				not played
5	(China) (Denmark)	Han Yue; Julie Dawall Jakobsen				not played

=== Japan vs India ===
Japan
3
Hi-Tech Zone Sports Centre Gymnasium Court 2
2 May 2024 09:30 UTC+8

India
0

			1	2	3
1	(Japan) (India)	Aya Ohori; Ashmita Chaliha	21; 10	20; 22	21; 15
2	(Japan) (India)	Nami Matsuyama / Chiharu Shida; Priya Konjengbam / Shruti Mishra	21; 8	21; 9
3	(Japan) (India)	Nozomi Okuhara; Isharani Baruah	21; 15	21; 12
4	(Japan) (India)	Rena Miyaura / Ayako Sakuramoto; Simran Singhi / Ritika Thaker				not played
5	(Japan) (India)	Tomoka Miyazaki; Tanvi Sharma				not played

=== Indonesia vs Thailand ===
Indonesia
3
Hi-Tech Zone Sports Centre Gymnasium Court 1
3 May 2024 09:30 UTC+8

Thailand
0

			1	2	3
1	(Indonesia) (Thailand)	Gregoria Mariska Tunjung; Ratchanok Intanon	22; 20	21; 18
2	(Indonesia) (Thailand)	Apriyani Rahayu / Siti Fadia Silva Ramadhanti; Jongkolphan Kititharakul / Rawinda Prajongjai	21; 17	21; 14
3	(Indonesia) (Thailand)	Ester Nurumi Tri Wardoyo; Supanida Katethong	19; 21	21; 19	21; 19
4	(Indonesia) (Thailand)	Lanny Tria Mayasari / Ribka Sugiarto; Nuntakarn Aimsaard / Phataimas Muenwong				not played
5	(Indonesia) (Thailand)	Komang Ayu Cahya Dewi; Busanan Ongbamrungphan				not played

=== Chinese Taipei vs South Korea ===
Chinese Taipei
0
Hi-Tech Zone Sports Centre Gymnasium Court 2
3 May 2024 09:30 UTC+8

South Korea
3

			1	2	3
1	(Chinese Taipei) (South Korea)	Hsu Wen-chi; An Se-young	14; 21	9; 21
2	(Chinese Taipei) (South Korea)	Hsu Ya-ching / Lin Wan-ching; Baek Ha-na / Lee So-hee	6; 21	19; 21
3	(Chinese Taipei) (South Korea)	Sung Shuo-yun; Sim Yu-jin	5; 21	15; 21
4	(Chinese Taipei) (South Korea)	Hu Ling-fang / Yang Ching-tun; Jeong Na-eun / Kong Hee-yong				not played
5	(Chinese Taipei) (South Korea)	Pai Yu-po; Kim Ga-ram				not played

== Semi-finals ==
=== China vs Japan ===
China
3
Hi-Tech Zone Sports Centre Gymnasium Court 1
4 May 2024 09:30 UTC+8

Japan
0

			1	2	3
1	(China) (Japan)	Chen Yufei; Aya Ohori	21; 18	21; 15
2	(China) (Japan)	Chen Qingchen / Jia Yifan; Nami Matsuyama / Chiharu Shida	14; 21	21; 13	23; 21
3	(China) (Japan)	He Bingjiao; Nozomi Okuhara	21; 8	21; 18
4	(China) (Japan)	Liu Shengshu / Zhang Shuxian; Rena Miyaura / Ayako Sakuramoto				not played
5	(China) (Japan)	Han Yue; Tomoka Miyazaki				not played

=== Indonesia vs South Korea ===
Indonesia
3
Hi-Tech Zone Sports Centre Gymnasium Court 2
4 May 2024 09:30 UTC+8

South Korea
2

			1	2	3
1	(Indonesia) (South Korea)	Gregoria Mariska Tunjung; Sim Yu-jin	21; 15	21; 13
2	(Indonesia) (South Korea)	Apriyani Rahayu / Siti Fadia Silva Ramadhanti; Baek Ha-na / Lee So-hee	6; 21	18; 21
3	(Indonesia) (South Korea)	Ester Nurumi Tri Wardoyo; Kim Ga-ram	20; 22	21; 16	21; 12
4	(Indonesia) (South Korea)	Lanny Tria Mayasari / Ribka Sugiarto; Jeong Na-eun / Kong Hee-yong	15; 21	14; 21
5	(Indonesia) (South Korea)	Komang Ayu Cahya Dewi; Kim Min-sun	17; 21	21; 16	21; 19

== Final ==
=== China vs Indonesia ===
China
3
Hi-Tech Zone Sports Centre Gymnasium Court 1
5 May 2024 09:30 UTC+8

Indonesia
0

			1	2	3
1	(China) (Indonesia)	Chen Yufei; Gregoria Mariska Tunjung	21; 7	21; 16
2	(China) (Indonesia)	Chen Qingchen / Jia Yifan; Siti Fadia Silva Ramadhanti / Ribka Sugiarto	21; 11	21; 8
3	(China) (Indonesia)	He Bingjiao; Ester Nurumi Tri Wardoyo	10; 21	21; 15	21; 17
4	(China) (Indonesia)	Liu Shengshu / Zhang Shuxian; Lanny Tria Mayasari / Rachel Allessya Rose				not played
5	(China) (Indonesia)	Han Yue; Komang Ayu Cahya Dewi				not played
