= 2024 Uber Cup group stage =

Badminton Team Tournament in China

The 2024 Uber Cup group stage was held at the Chengdu High-tech Zone Sports Center Gymnasium in Chengdu, China, from 28 to 30 April 2024. The top two teams from each group advanced to the knockout stage.

== Draw ==
The original draw for the tournament was conducted on 22 March 2024 at 15:00 CSTT, at Chengdu, China. The 16 teams were drawn into four groups each containing four teams and were allocated to four pots based on the World Team Rankings.

| Pot 1 | Pot 2 | Pot 3 | Pot 4 |
|---|---|---|---|
| China; South Korea; Japan; Thailand | Indonesia; Chinese Taipei; India; Denmark | United States; Malaysia; Canada; Hong Kong | Singapore; Australia; Mexico; Uganda |

=== Group composition ===
Group
| Group A | Group B | Group C | Group D |
|---|---|---|---|
| China (Host); India; Canada; Singapore | Thailand; Chinese Taipei; Malaysia; Australia | Japan; Indonesia; Hong Kong; Uganda | South Korea; Denmark; United States; Mexico |

== Group A ==
| Pos | Team | Pld | W | L | MF | MA | MD | GF | GA | GD | PF | PA | PD | Pts | Qualification |
|---|---|---|---|---|---|---|---|---|---|---|---|---|---|---|---|
| 1 | China | 3 | 3 | 0 | 15 | 0 | +15 | 30 | 0 | +30 | 630 | 305 | +325 | 3 | Advance to quarter-finals |
| 2 | India | 3 | 2 | 1 | 8 | 7 | +1 | 16 | 14 | +2 | 510 | 520 | −10 | 2 | Advance to quarter-finals |
| 3 | Canada | 3 | 1 | 2 | 6 | 9 | −3 | 12 | 18 | −6 | 496 | 602 | −106 | 1 | |
| 4 | Singapore | 3 | 0 | 3 | 1 | 14 | −13 | 2 | 28 | −26 | 424 | 633 | −209 | 0 | |

Source: Tournament software
Rules for classification: Tiebreakers

=== China vs Singapore ===
China
5
Hi-Tech Zone Sports Centre Gymnasium Court 1
27 April 2024, 08:30 UTC+8

Singapore
0

| | | | 1 | 2 | 3 |
|---|---|---|---|---|---|
| 1 | (China) (Singapore) | He Bingjiao; Yeo Jia Min | 21; 15 | 21; 13 |
| 2 | (China) (Singapore) | Liu Shengshu / Tan Ning; Heng Xiao En / Jin Yujia | 21; 4 | 21; 11 |
| 3 | (China) (Singapore) | Han Yue; Insyirah Khan | 21; 8 | 21; 5 |
| 4 | (China) (Singapore) | Zhang Shuxian / Zheng Yu; Elsa Lai Yi Ting / Michelle Zan | 21; 3 | 21; 12 |
| 5 | (China) (Singapore) | Wang Zhiyi; Megan Lee Xin Yi | 21; 12 | 21; 10 |

=== India vs Canada ===
India
4
Hi-Tech Zone Sports Centre Gymnasium Court 4
27 April 2024, 13:00 UTC+8

Canada
1

| | | | 1 | 2 | 3 |
|---|---|---|---|---|---|
| 1 | (India) (Canada) | Ashmita Chaliha; Michelle Li | 26; 24 | 24; 22 |
| 2 | (India) (Canada) | Priya Konjengbam / Shruti Mishra; Catherine Choi / Jeslyn Chow | 21; 12 | 21; 10 |
| 3 | (India) (Canada) | Isharani Baruah; Wen Yu Zhang | 21; 13 | 21; 12 |
| 4 | (India) (Canada) | Simran Singhi / Ritika Thaker; Jackie Dent / Crystal Lai | 19; 21 | 15; 21 |
| 5 | (India) (Canada) | Anmol Kharb; Eliana Zhang | 21; 15 | 21; 11 |

=== India vs Singapore ===
India
4
Hi-Tech Zone Sports Centre Gymnasium Court 3
28 April 2024, 08:30 UTC+8

Singapore
1

| | | | 1 | 2 | 3 |
|---|---|---|---|---|---|
| 1 | (India) (Singapore) | Ashmita Chaliha; Yeo Jia Min | 15; 21 | 18; 21 |
| 2 | (India) (Singapore) | Priya Konjengbam / Shruti Mishra; Heng Xiao En / Jin Yujia | 21; 15 | 21; 16 |
| 3 | (India) (Singapore) | Isharani Baruah; Insyirah Khan | 21; 13 | 21; 16 |
| 4 | (India) (Singapore) | Simran Singhi / Ritika Thaker; Elsa Lai Yi Ting / Michelle Zan | 21; 8 | 21; 11 |
| 5 | (India) (Singapore) | Anmol Kharb; Megan Lee Xin Yi | 21; 15 | 21; 13 |

=== China vs Canada ===
China
5
Hi-Tech Zone Sports Centre Gymnasium Court 2
28 April 2024, 13:00 UTC+8

Canada
0

| | | | 1 | 2 | 3 |
|---|---|---|---|---|---|
| 1 | (China) (Canada) | He Bingjiao; Michelle Li | 21; 19 | 21; 19 |
| 2 | (China) (Canada) | Chen Qingchen / Jia Yifan; Jackie Dent / Crystal Lai | 21; 8 | 21; 6 |
| 3 | (China) (Canada) | Han Yue; Wen Yu Zhang | 21; 16 | 21; 13 |
| 4 | (China) (Canada) | Liu Shengshu / Zhang Shuxian; Jeslyn Chow / Eliana Zhang | 21; 4 | 21; 9 |
| 5 | (China) (Canada) | Wang Zhiyi; Catherine Choi | 21; 12 | 21; 7 |

=== China vs India ===
China
5
Hi-Tech Sports Centre Gymnasium Court 1
30 April 2024, 09:30 UTC+8

India
0

| | | | 1 | 2 | 3 |
|---|---|---|---|---|---|---|
| 1 | (China) (India) | Chen Yufei; Isharani Baruah | 21; 12 | 21; 10 |
| 2 | (China) (India) | Chen Qingchen / Jia Yifan; Priya Konjengbam / Shruti Mishra | 21; 13 | 21; 12 |
| 3 | (China) (India) | Han Yue; Anmol Kharb | 21; 9 | 4; 1 | | retired |
| 4 | (China) (India) | Liu Shengshu / Tan Ning; Simran Singhi / Ritika Thaker | 21; 9 | 21; 10 |
| 5 | (China) (India) | Wang Zhiyi; Tanvi Sharma | 21; 7 | 21; 16 |

=== Canada vs Singapore ===
Canada
5
Hi-Tech Zone Sports Centre Gymnasium Court 3
30 April 2024, 17:00 UTC+8

Singapore
0

| | | | 1 | 2 | 3 |
|---|---|---|---|---|---|
| 1 | (Canada) (Singapore) | Michelle Li; Yeo Jia Min | 21; 10 | 24; 22 |
| 2 | (Canada) (Singapore) | Catherine Choi / Crystal Lai; Heng Xiao En / Jin Yujia | 22; 20 | 22; 20 |
| 3 | (Canada) (Singapore) | Wen Yu Zhang; Jaslyn Hooi | 21; 14 | 21; 17 |
| 4 | (Canada) (Singapore) | Jeslyn Chow / Eliana Zhang; Elsa Lai Yi Ting / Michelle Zan | 21; 17 | 28; 26 |
| 5 | (Canada) (Singapore) | Jackie Dent; Megan Lee Xin Yi | 21; 19 | 21; 17 |

== Group B ==
| Pos | Team | Pld | W | L | MF | MA | MD | GF | GA | GD | PF | PA | PD | Pts | Qualification |
|---|---|---|---|---|---|---|---|---|---|---|---|---|---|---|---|
| 1 | Thailand | 3 | 3 | 0 | 15 | 0 | +15 | 30 | 1 | +29 | 650 | 368 | +282 | 3 | Advance to quarter-finals |
| 2 | Chinese Taipei | 3 | 2 | 1 | 8 | 7 | +1 | 17 | 15 | +2 | 584 | 565 | +19 | 2 | Advance to quarter-finals |
| 3 | Malaysia | 3 | 1 | 2 | 5 | 10 | −5 | 11 | 21 | −10 | 519 | 571 | −52 | 1 | |
| 4 | Australia | 3 | 0 | 3 | 2 | 13 | −11 | 5 | 26 | −21 | 379 | 628 | −249 | 0 | |

Source: Tournament software
Rules for classification: Tiebreakers

=== Chinese Taipei vs Malaysia ===
Chinese Taipei
4
Hi-Tech Zone Sports Centre Gymnasium Court 1
28 April 2024, 08:30 UTC+8

Malaysia
1

| | | | 1 | 2 | 3 |
|---|---|---|---|---|---|
| 1 | (Chinese Taipei) (Malaysia) | Tai Tzu-ying; Goh Jin Wei | 21; 19 | 22; 20 |
| 2 | (Chinese Taipei) (Malaysia) | Hsu Ya-ching / Lin Wan-ching; Go Pei Kee / Teoh Mei Xing | 19; 21 | 17; 21 |
| 3 | (Chinese Taipei) (Malaysia) | Hsu Wen-chi; Letshanaa Karupathevan | 13; 21 | 21; 17 | 21; 16 |
| 4 | (Chinese Taipei) (Malaysia) | Hu Ling-fang / Teng Chun-hsun; Ho Lo Ee / Tan Zhing Yi | 21; 17 | 21; 11 |
| 5 | (Chinese Taipei) (Malaysia) | Sung Shuo-yun; Wong Ling Ching | 21; 17 | 22; 20 |

=== Thailand vs Australia ===
Thailand
5
Hi-Tech Zone Sports Centre Gymnasium Court 4
28 April 2024, 09:30 UTC+8

Australia
0

| | | | 1 | 2 | 3 |
|---|---|---|---|---|---|
| 1 | (Thailand) (Australia) | Ratchanok Intanon; Tiffany Ho | 21; 6 | 21; 10 |
| 2 | (Thailand) (Australia) | Jongkolphan Kititharakul / Rawinda Prajongjai; Setyana Mapasa / Angela Yu | 21; 18 | 21; 18 |
| 3 | (Thailand) (Australia) | Supanida Katethong; Sydney Tjonadi | 21; 8 | 21; 5 |
| 4 | (Thailand) (Australia) | Nuntakarn Aimsaard / Laksika Kanlaha; Kaitlyn Ea / Gronya Somerville | 21; 17 | 21; 12 |
| 5 | (Thailand) (Australia) | Busanan Ongbamrungphan; Isabella Yan | 21; 6 | 21; 2 |

=== Chinese Taipei vs Australia ===
Chinese Taipei
4
Hi-Tech Sports Centre Gymnasium Court 4
29 April 2024, 09:30 UTC+8

Australia
1

| | | | 1 | 2 | 3 |
|---|---|---|---|---|---|
| 1 | (Chinese Taipei) (Australia) | Hsu Wen-chi; Tiffany Ho | 21; 6 | 21; 10 |
| 2 | (Chinese Taipei) (Australia) | Chang Ching-hui / Yang Ching-tun; Setyana Mapasa / Angela Yu | 19; 21 | 18; 21 |
| 3 | (Chinese Taipei) (Australia) | Sung Shuo-yun; Sydney Tjonadi | 21; 13 | 21; 10 |
| 4 | (Chinese Taipei) (Australia) | Hu Ling-fang / Teng Chun-hsun; Kaitlyn Ea / Gronya Somerville | 21; 10 | 21; 18 |
| 5 | (Chinese Taipei) (Australia) | Pai Yu-po; Isabella Yan | 21; 7 | 21; 19 |

=== Thailand vs Malaysia ===
Thailand
5
Hi-Tech Sports Centre Gymnasium Court 2
29 April 2024, 17:00 UTC+8

Malaysia
0

| | | | 1 | 2 | 3 |
|---|---|---|---|---|---|
| 1 | (Thailand) (Malaysia) | Supanida Katethong; Letshanaa Karupathevan | 21; 17 | 21; 6 |
| 2 | (Thailand) (Malaysia) | Jongkolphan Kititharakul / Rawinda Prajongjai; Go Pei Kee / Teoh Mei Xing | 21; 10 | 21; 14 |
| 3 | (Thailand) (Malaysia) | Pornpawee Chochuwong; Wong Ling Ching | 21; 11 | 21; 15 |
| 4 | (Thailand) (Malaysia) | Laksika Kanlaha / Phataimas Muenwong; Chan Wan Tse / Tan Zhing Yi | 21; 12 | 21; 8 |
| 5 | (Thailand) (Malaysia) | Busanan Ongbamrungphan; Siti Nurshuhaini | 21; 5 | 21; 8 |

=== Thailand vs Chinese Taipei ===
Thailand
5
Hi-Tech Zone Sports Centre Gymnasium Court 2
1 May 2024, 09:30 UTC+8

Chinese Taipei
0

| | | | 1 | 2 | 3 |
|---|---|---|---|---|---|
| 1 | (Thailand) (Chinese Taipei) | Ratchanok Intanon; Hsu Wen-chi | 21; 18 | 21; 18 |
| 2 | (Thailand) (Chinese Taipei) | Jongkolphan Kititharakul / Rawinda Prajongjai; Hsu Ya-ching / Yang Ching-tun | 21; 10 | 21; 12 |
| 3 | (Thailand) (Chinese Taipei) | Supanida Katethong; Sung Shuo-yun | 21; 9 | 21; 13 |
| 4 | (Thailand) (Chinese Taipei) | Nuntakarn Aimsaard / Phataimas Muenwong; Hu Ling-fang / Teng Chun-hsun | 21; 14 | 21; 19 |
| 5 | (Thailand) (Chinese Taipei) | Pornpawee Chochuwong; Pai Yu-po | 21; 11 | 20; 22 | 21; 14 |

=== Malaysia vs Australia ===
Malaysia
4
Hi-Tech Zone Sports Centre Gymnasium Court 3
1 May 2024, 09:30 UTC+8

Australia
1

| | | | 1 | 2 | 3 |
|---|---|---|---|---|---|
| 1 | (Malaysia) (Australia) | Goh Jin Wei; Tiffany Ho | 21; 6 | 21; 12 |
| 2 | (Malaysia) (Australia) | Go Pei Kee / Teoh Mei Xing; Setyana Mapasa / Angela Yu | 15; 21 | 17; 21 |
| 3 | (Malaysia) (Australia) | Wong Ling Ching; Sydney Tjonadi | 21; 16 | 21; 3 |
| 4 | (Malaysia) (Australia) | Ho Lo Ee / Tan Zhing Yi; Kaitlyn Ea / Gronya Somerville | 21; 12 | 13; 21 | 21; 10 |
| 5 | (Malaysia) (Australia) | Siti Zulaikha; Isabella Yan | 21; 10 | 21; 10 |

== Group C ==
| Pos | Team | Pld | W | L | MF | MA | MD | GF | GA | GD | PF | PA | PD | Pts | Qualification |
|---|---|---|---|---|---|---|---|---|---|---|---|---|---|---|---|
| 1 | Japan | 3 | 3 | 0 | 13 | 2 | +11 | 28 | 8 | +20 | 705 | 453 | +252 | 3 | Advance to quarter-finals |
| 2 | Indonesia | 3 | 2 | 1 | 12 | 3 | +9 | 26 | 10 | +16 | 695 | 533 | +162 | 2 | Advance to quarter-finals |
| 3 | Hong Kong | 3 | 1 | 2 | 5 | 10 | −5 | 14 | 20 | −6 | 564 | 558 | +6 | 1 | |
| 4 | Uganda | 3 | 0 | 3 | 0 | 15 | −15 | 0 | 30 | −30 | 210 | 630 | −420 | 0 | |

Source: Tournament software
Rules for classification: Tiebreakers

=== Japan vs Uganda ===
Japan
5
Hi-Tech Zone Sports Centre Gymnasium Court 4
27 April 2024, 08:30 UTC+8

Uganda
0

| | | | 1 | 2 | 3 |
|---|---|---|---|---|---|
| 1 | (Japan) (Uganda) | Aya Ohori; Fadilah Mohamed Rafi | 21; 7 | 21; 1 |
| 2 | (Japan) (Uganda) | Nozomi Okuhara; Husina Kobugabe | 21; 8 | 21; 5 |
| 3 | (Japan) (Uganda) | Tomoka Miyazaki; Gladys Mbabazi | 21; 6 | 21; 5 |
| 4 | (Japan) (Uganda) | Rena Miyaura / Ayako Sakuramoto; Fadilah Mohamed Rafi / Tracy Naluwooza | 21; 0 | 21; 4 |
| 5 | (Japan) (Uganda) | Nami Matsuyama / Wakana Nagahara; Husina Kobugabe / Gladys Mbabazi | 21; 2 | 21; 5 |

=== Indonesia vs Hong Kong ===
Indonesia
5
Hi-Tech Zone Sports Centre Gymnasium Court 2
27 April 2024, 13:00 UTC+8

Hong Kong
0

| | | | 1 | 2 | 3 |
|---|---|---|---|---|---|
| 1 | (Indonesia) (Hong Kong) | Gregoria Mariska Tunjung; Yeung Sum Yee | 21; 15 | 21; 11 |
| 2 | (Indonesia) (Hong Kong) | Lanny Tria Mayasari / Ribka Sugiarto; Yeung Nga Ting / Yeung Pui Lam | 10; 21 | 21; 10 | 21; 17 |
| 3 | (Indonesia) (Hong Kong) | Ester Nurumi Tri Wardoyo; Saloni Samirbhai Mehta | 21; 14 | 21; 12 |
| 4 | (Indonesia) (Hong Kong) | Meilysa Trias Puspita Sari / Rachel Allessya Rose; Lui Lok Lok / Ng Wing Yung | 21; 16 | 20; 22 | 21; 18 |
| 5 | (Indonesia) (Hong Kong) | Komang Ayu Cahya Dewi; Liang Ka Wing | 21; 16 | 21; 17 |

=== Japan vs Hong Kong ===
Japan
5
Hi-Tech Sports Centre Gymnasium Court 1
29 April 2024, 9:30 UTC+8

Hong Kong
0

| | | | 1 | 2 | 3 |
|---|---|---|---|---|---|
| 1 | (Japan) (Hong Kong) | Akane Yamaguchi; Yeung Sum Yee | 21; 5 | 21; 14 |
| 2 | (Japan) (Hong Kong) | Nami Matsuyama / Chiharu Shida; Yeung Nga Ting / Yeung Pui Lam | 11; 21 | 21; 16 | 21; 11 |
| 3 | (Japan) (Hong Kong) | Nozomi Okuhara; Saloni Samirbhai Mehta | 21; 15 | 21; 11 |
| 4 | (Japan) (Hong Kong) | Rena Miyaura / Ayako Sakuramoto; Fan Ka Yan / Yau Mau Ying | 21; 14 | 21; 12 |
| 5 | (Japan) (Hong Kong) | Tomoka Miyazaki; Liang Ka Wing | 16; 21 | 21; 12 | 21; 13 |

=== Indonesia vs Uganda ===
Indonesia
5
Hi-Tech Zone Sports Centre Gymnasium Court 4
29 April 2024, 17:00 UTC+8

Uganda
0

| | | | 1 | 2 | 3 |
|---|---|---|---|---|---|
| 1 | (Indonesia) (Uganda) | Ester Nurumi Tri Wardoyo; Husina Kobugabe | 21; 5 | 21; 6 |
| 2 | (Indonesia) (Uganda) | Komang Ayu Cahya Dewi; Gladys Mbabazi | 21; 6 | 21; 13 |
| 3 | (Indonesia) (Uganda) | Ruzana; Tracy Naluwooza | 21; 10 | 21; 12 |
| 4 | (Indonesia) (Uganda) | Apriyani Rahayu / Siti Fadia Silva Ramadhanti; Husina Kobugabe / Gladys Mbabazi | 21; 9 | 21; 11 |
| 5 | (Indonesia) (Uganda) | Lanny Tria Mayasari / Rachel Allessya Rose; Fadilah Mohamed Rafi / Tracy Naluwooza | 21; 6 | 21; 8 |

=== Japan vs Indonesia ===
Japan
3
Hi-Tech Zone Sports Centre Gymnasium Court 1
1 May 2024, 09:30 UTC+8

Indonesia
2

| | | | 1 | 2 | 3 |
|---|---|---|---|---|---|
| 1 | (Japan) (Indonesia) | Akane Yamaguchi; Gregoria Mariska Tunjung | 21; 17 | 17; 21 | 13; 21 |
| 2 | (Japan) (Indonesia) | Nami Matsuyama / Chiharu Shida; Lanny Tria Mayasari / Siti Fadia Silva Ramadhanti | 21; 9 | 20; 22 | 21; 16 |
| 3 | (Japan) (Indonesia) | Aya Ohori; Ester Nurumi Tri Wardoyo | 14; 21 | 22; 20 | 21; 18 |
| 4 | (Japan) (Indonesia) | Rena Miyaura / Ayako Sakuramoto; Meilysa Trias Puspita Sari / Rachel Allessya Rose | 21; 9 | 21; 15 |
| 5 | (Japan) (Indonesia) | Tomoka Miyazaki; Komang Ayu Cahya Dewi | 12; 21 | 21; 14 | 13; 21 |

=== Hong Kong vs Uganda ===
Hong Kong
5
Hi-Tech Zone Sports Centre Gymnasium Court 4
1 May 2024, 09:30 UTC+8

Uganda
0

| | | | 1 | 2 | 3 |
|---|---|---|---|---|---|
| 1 | (Hong Kong) (Uganda) | Lo Sin Yan; Fadilah Mohamed Rafi | 21; 9 | 21; 6 |
| 2 | (Hong Kong) (Uganda) | Yeung Sum Yee; Husina Kobugabe | 21; 9 | 21; 9 |
| 3 | (Hong Kong) (Uganda) | Saloni Samirbhai Mehta; Gladys Mbabazi | 21; 10 | 21; 11 |
| 4 | (Hong Kong) (Uganda) | Fan Ka Yan / Yau Mau Ying; Fadilah Mohamed Rafi / Tracy Naluwooza | 21; 3 | 21; 7 |
| 5 | (Hong Kong) (Uganda) | Lui Lok Lok / Ng Wing Yung; Husina Kobugabe / Gladys Mbabazi | 21; 9 | 21; 8 |

== Group D ==
| Pos | Team | Pld | W | L | MF | MA | MD | GF | GA | GD | PF | PA | PD | Pts | Qualification |
|---|---|---|---|---|---|---|---|---|---|---|---|---|---|---|---|
| 1 | South Korea | 3 | 3 | 0 | 15 | 0 | +15 | 30 | 1 | +29 | 651 | 395 | +256 | 3 | Advance to quarter-finals |
| 2 | Denmark | 3 | 2 | 1 | 10 | 5 | +5 | 21 | 13 | +8 | 655 | 511 | +144 | 2 | Advance to quarter-finals |
| 3 | United States | 3 | 1 | 2 | 5 | 10 | −5 | 13 | 20 | −7 | 526 | 558 | −32 | 1 | |
| 4 | Mexico | 3 | 0 | 3 | 0 | 15 | −15 | 0 | 30 | −30 | 262 | 630 | −368 | 0 | |

Source: Tournament software
Rules for classification: Tiebreakers

=== South Korea vs Mexico ===
South Korea
5
Hi-Tech Zone Sports Centre Gymnasium Court 3
27 April 2024, 18:00 UTC+8

Mexico
0

| | | | 1 | 2 | 3 |
|---|---|---|---|---|---|
| 1 | (South Korea) (Mexico) | Sim Yu-jin; Vanessa García | 21; 10 | 21; 5 |
| 2 | (South Korea) (Mexico) | Kim Ga-ram; Haramara Gaitán | 21; 15 | 21; 7 |
| 3 | (South Korea) (Mexico) | Kim Min-sun; Sabrina Solis | 21; 14 | 21; 10 |
| 4 | (South Korea) (Mexico) | Kim Hye-jeong / Kong Hee-yong; Vanessa García / Fatima Rio | 21; 2 | 21; 7 |
| 5 | (South Korea) (Mexico) | Baek Ha-na / Lee So-hee; Haramara Gaitán / Sabrina Solis | 21; 10 | 21; 8 |

=== Denmark vs United States ===
Denmark
5
Hi-Tech Zone Sports Centre Gymnasium Court 4
27 April 2024, 18:00 UTC+8

United States
0

| | | | 1 | 2 | 3 |
|---|---|---|---|---|---|
| 1 | (Denmark) (United States) | Line Kjærsfeldt; Beiwen Zhang | 21; 14 | 13; 21 | 21; 10 |
| 2 | (Denmark) (United States) | Maiken Fruergaard / Sara Thygesen; Annie Xu / Kerry Xu | 15; 21 | 21; 13 | 21; 18 |
| 3 | (Denmark) (United States) | Line Christophersen; Esther Shi | 24; 26 | 21; 14 | 21; 11 |
| 4 | (Denmark) (United States) | Alexandra Bøje / Amalie Magelund; Katelin Ngo / Joline Siu | 21; 3 | 21; 10 |
| 5 | (Denmark) (United States) | Julie Dawall Jakobsen; Ella Lin | 21; 19 | 21; 12 |

=== Denmark vs Mexico ===
Denmark
5
Hi-Tech Zone Sports Centre Gymnasium Court 2
28 April 2024, 18:00 UTC+8

Mexico
0

| | | | 1 | 2 | 3 |
|---|---|---|---|---|---|
| 1 | (Denmark) (Mexico) | Line Christophersen; Vanessa García | 21; 4 | 21; 11 |
| 2 | (Denmark) (Mexico) | Julie Dawall Jakobsen; Haramara Gaitán | 21; 13 | 21; 7 |
| 3 | (Denmark) (Mexico) | Amalie Schulz; Sabrina Solís | 21; 17 | 21; 7 |
| 4 | (Denmark) (Mexico) | Christine Busch / Amalie Magelund; Vanessa García / Fatima Rio | 21; 6 | 21; 8 |
| 5 | (Denmark) (Mexico) | Maiken Fruergaard / Sara Thygesen; Haramara Gaitán / Sabrina Solís | 21; 7 | 21; 8 |

=== South Korea vs United States ===
South Korea
5
Hi-Tech Zone Sports Centre Gymnasium Court 3
28 April 2024, 18:00 UTC+8

United States
0

| | | | 1 | 2 | 3 |
|---|---|---|---|---|---|
| 1 | (South Korea) (United States) | An Se-young; Beiwen Zhang | 21; 11 | 21; 16 |
| 2 | (South Korea) (United States) | Kim Hye-jeong / Lee So-hee; Annie Xu / Kerry Xu | 21; 9 | 21; 16 |
| 3 | (South Korea) (United States) | Sim Yu-jin; Esther Shi | 21; 18 | 21; 10 |
| 4 | (South Korea) (United States) | Jeong Na-eun / Kong Hee-yong; Chloe Ho / Veronica Yang | 21; 8 | 21; 10 |
| 5 | (South Korea) (United States) | Kim Ga-ram; Ella Lin | 21; 7 | 21; 19 |

=== South Korea vs Denmark ===
South Korea
5
Hi-Tech Zone Sports Centre Gymnasium Court 2
30 April 2024, 09:30 UTC+8

Denmark
0

| | | | 1 | 2 | 3 |
|---|---|---|---|---|---|
| 1 | (South Korea) (Denmark) | An Se-young; Line Kjærsfeldt | 21; 14 | 21; 14 |
| 2 | (South Korea) (Denmark) | Baek Ha-na / Lee So-hee; Maiken Fruergaard / Sara Thygesen | 21; 19 | 21; 16 |
| 3 | (South Korea) (Denmark) | Sim Yu-jin; Line Christophersen | 21; 19 | 21; 15 |
| 4 | (South Korea) (Denmark) | Jeong Na-eun / Kong Hee-yong; Alexandra Bøje / Amalie Magelund | 21; 14 | 19; 21 | 21; 11 |
| 5 | (South Korea) (Denmark) | Kim Ga-ram; Julie Dawall Jakobsen | 21; 19 | 23; 21 |

=== United States vs Mexico ===
United States
5
Hi-Tech Zone Sports Centre Gymnasium Court 4
30 April 2024, 18:00 UTC+8

Mexico
0

| | | | 1 | 2 | 3 |
|---|---|---|---|---|---|
| 1 | (United States) (Mexico) | Esther Shi; Vanessa García | 21; 11 | 21; 3 |
| 2 | (United States) (Mexico) | Ella Lin; Sabrina Solís | 21; 9 | 21; 10 |
| 3 | (United States) (Mexico) | Veronica Yang; Fatima Rio | 21; 9 | 21; 10 |
| 4 | (United States) (Mexico) | Annie Xu / Kerry Xu; Haramara Gaitán / Sabrina Solís | 21; 6 | 21; 10 |
| 5 | (United States) (Mexico) | Katelin Ngo / Joline Siu; Vanessa García / Fatima Rio | 21; 5 | 21; 13 |
