= 2024 Thomas Cup knockout stage =

Badminton championships

The knockout stage for the 2024 Thomas Cup in Chengdu, China, began on 3 May 2024 with the quarter-finals and ended on 5 May with the final tie.

== Qualified teams ==
The top two placed teams from each of the eight groups qualified for this stage.

| Group | Winners | Runners-up |
|---|---|---|
| A | China | South Korea |
| B | Japan | Chinese Taipei |
| C | Indonesia | India |
| D | Denmark | Malaysia |

== Bracket ==
The draw was conducted on 1 May 2024, after the last match of the group stage.

Quarter-finals
China | 3
India | 1
Japan | 1
Malaysia | 3
South Korea | 1
Indonesia | 3
Chinese Taipei | 3
Denmark | 1

Semi-finals
China | 3
Malaysia | 1
Indonesia | 3
Chinese Taipei | 0

Final
China | 3
Indonesia | 1

== Quarter-finals ==
=== China vs India ===
China
3
Hi-Tech Zone Sports Centre Gymnasium Court 1
2 May 2024 17:00 UTC+8

India
1

| | | | 1 | 2 | 3 |
|---|---|---|---|---|---|---|
| 1 | (China) (India) | Shi Yuqi; Prannoy H. S. | 15; 21 | 21; 11 | 21; 14 |
| 2 | (China) (India) | Liang Weikeng / Wang Chang; Satwiksairaj Rankireddy / Chirag Shetty | 21; 15 | 11; 21 | 21; 12 |
| 3 | (China) (India) | Li Shifeng; Lakshya Sen | 21; 13 | 8; 21 | 14; 21 |
| 4 | (China) (India) | He Jiting / Ren Xiangyu; Dhruv Kapila / Sai Pratheek K. | 21; 10 | 21; 10 |
| 5 | (China) (India) | Lu Guangzu; Kiran George | | | | not played |

=== Japan vs Malaysia ===
Japan
1
Hi-Tech Zone Sports Centre Gymnasium Court 2
2 May 2024 17:00 UTC+8

Malaysia
3

| | | | 1 | 2 | 3 |
|---|---|---|---|---|---|---|
| 1 | (Japan) (Malaysia) | Kenta Nishimoto; Lee Zii Jia | 13; 21 | 3; 21 |
| 2 | (Japan) (Malaysia) | Takuro Hoki / Yugo Kobayashi; Aaron Chia / Soh Wooi Yik | 18; 21 | 21; 14 | 21; 19 |
| 3 | (Japan) (Malaysia) | Koki Watanabe; Leong Jun Hao | 13; 21 | 10; 21 |
| 4 | (Japan) (Malaysia) | Akira Koga / Taichi Saito; Goh Sze Fei / Nur Izzuddin | 21; 18 | 15; 21 | 12; 21 |
| 5 | (Japan) (Malaysia) | Kento Momota; Justin Hoh | | | | not played |

=== South Korea vs Indonesia ===
South Korea
1
Hi-Tech Zone Sports Centre Gymnasium Court 2
3 May 2024 17:00 UTC+8

Indonesia
3

| | | | 1 | 2 | 3 |
|---|---|---|---|---|---|---|
| 1 | (South Korea) (Indonesia) | Jeon Hyeok-jin; Anthony Sinisuka Ginting | 21; 14 | 16; 21 | 16; 21 |
| 2 | (South Korea) (Indonesia) | Kang Min-hyuk / Seo Seung-jae; Muhammad Shohibul Fikri / Bagas Maulana | 21; 15 | 21; 12 |
| 3 | (South Korea) (Indonesia) | Cho Geon-yeop; Jonatan Christie | 21; 17 | 17; 21 | 10; 21 |
| 4 | (South Korea) (Indonesia) | Ki Dong-ju / Kim Won-ho; Fajar Alfian / Daniel Marthin | 12; 21 | 13; 21 |
| 5 | (South Korea) (Indonesia) | Lee Yun-gyu; Chico Aura Dwi Wardoyo | | | | not played |

=== Chinese Taipei vs Denmark ===
Chinese Taipei
3
Hi-Tech Zone Sports Centre Gymnasium Court 1
3 May 2024 17:00 UTC+8

Denmark
1

| | | | 1 | 2 | 3 |
|---|---|---|---|---|---|---|
| 1 | (Chinese Taipei) (Denmark) | Chou Tien-chen; Viktor Axelsen | 21; 19 | 14; 21 | 21; 19 |
| 2 | (Chinese Taipei) (Denmark) | Lee Yang / Wang Chi-lin; Kim Astrup / Anders Skaarup Rasmussen | 21; 14 | 21; 15 |
| 3 | (Chinese Taipei) (Denmark) | Lin Chun-yi; Anders Antonsen | 21; 14 | 10; 21 | 14; 21 |
| 4 | (Chinese Taipei) (Denmark) | Lee Jhe-huei / Yang Po-hsuan; Rasmus Kjaer / Frederik Søgaard | 23; 21 | 21; 18 |
| 5 | (Chinese Taipei) (Denmark) | Wang Tzu-wei; Rasmus Gemke | | | | not played |

== Semi-finals ==
=== China vs Malaysia ===
China
3
Hi-Tech Zone Sports Centre Gymnasium Court 1
4 May 2024 17:00 UTC+8

Malaysia
1

| | | | 1 | 2 | 3 |
|---|---|---|---|---|---|---|
| 1 | (China) (Malaysia) | Shi Yuqi; Lee Zii Jia | 21; 19 | 21; 5 |
| 2 | (China) (Malaysia) | Liang Weikeng / Wang Chang; Aaron Chia / Soh Wooi Yik | 21; 15 | 12; 21 | 17; 21 |
| 3 | (China) (Malaysia) | Li Shifeng; Leong Jun Hao | 21; 17 | 21; 10 |
| 4 | (China) (Malaysia) | He Jiting / Ren Xiangyu; Goh Sze Fei / Nur Izzuddin | 18; 21 | 21; 19 | 21; 12 |
| 5 | (China) (Malaysia) | Lu Guangzu; Justin Hoh | | | | not played |

=== Indonesia vs Chinese Taipei ===
Indonesia
3
Hi-Tech Zone Sports Centre Gymnasium Court 2
4 May 2024 17:00 UTC+8

Chinese Taipei
0

| | | | 1 | 2 | 3 |
|---|---|---|---|---|---|---|
| 1 | (Indonesia) (Chinese Taipei) | Anthony Sinisuka Ginting; Chou Tien-chen | 21; 18 | 21; 19 |
| 2 | (Indonesia) (Chinese Taipei) | Fajar Alfian / Muhammad Rian Ardianto; Lee Yang / Wang Chi-lin | 16; 21 | 21; 19 | 21; 18 |
| 3 | (Indonesia) (Chinese Taipei) | Jonatan Christie; Wang Tzu-wei | 21; 11 | 21; 16 |
| 4 | (Indonesia) (Chinese Taipei) | Leo Rolly Carnando / Daniel Marthin; Lee Jhe-huei / Yang Po-hsuan | | | | not played |
| 5 | (Indonesia) (Chinese Taipei) | Chico Aura Dwi Wardoyo; Lee Chia-hao | | | | not played |

== Final ==
=== China vs Indonesia ===
China
3
Hi-Tech Zone Sports Centre Gymnasium Court 1
5 May 2024 18:00 UTC+8

Indonesia
1

| | | | 1 | 2 | 3 |
|---|---|---|---|---|---|---|
| 1 | (China) (Indonesia) | Shi Yuqi; Anthony Sinisuka Ginting | 21; 17 | 21; 6 |
| 2 | (China) (Indonesia) | Liang Weikeng / Wang Chang; Fajar Alfian / Muhammad Rian Ardianto | 21; 18 | 17; 21 | 21; 17 |
| 3 | (China) (Indonesia) | Li Shifeng; Jonatan Christie | 16; 21 | 21; 15 | 17; 21 |
| 4 | (China) (Indonesia) | He Jiting / Ren Xiangyu; Muhammad Shohibul Fikri / Bagas Maulana | 21; 11 | 21; 15 |
| 5 | (China) (Indonesia) | Lu Guangzu; Chico Aura Dwi Wardoyo | | | | not played |
