= 2024 Thomas Cup group stage =

Badminton Team Tournament in China

The 2024 Thomas Cup group stage was held at the Chengdu High-tech Zone Sports Center Gymnasium in Chengdu, China, from 28 April to 1 May 2024. The top two teams from each group advanced to the knockout stage.

== Draw ==
The original draw for the tournament was conducted on 22 March 2024 at 15:00 CSTT, at Chengdu, China. The 16 teams were drawn into four groups each containing four teams and were allocated to four pots based on the World Team Rankings.

Pot 1	Pot 2	Pot 3	Pot 4
China; Denmark; Indonesia; Japan	Malaysia; India; Chinese Taipei; South Korea	Thailand; Canada; Hong Kong; Germany	England; Czech Republic; Algeria; Australia

=== Group composition ===
Group
Group A	Group B	Group C	Group D
China (Host); South Korea; Canada; Australia	Japan; Chinese Taipei; Germany; Czech Republic	Indonesia; India; Thailand; England	Denmark; Malaysia; Hong Kong; Algeria

== Group A ==
Pos	Team	Pld	W	L	MF	MA	MD	GF	GA	GD	PF	PA	PD	Pts	Qualification
1	China	3	3	0	13	2	+11	28	5	+23	671	415	+256	3	Advance to quarter-finals
2	South Korea	3	2	1	12	3	+9	25	8	+17	632	471	+161	2	Advance to quarter-finals
3	Canada	3	1	2	3	12	−9	8	24	−16	449	621	−172	1	
4	Australia	3	0	3	2	13	−11	4	28	−24	404	649	−245	0	

Source: Tournament software
Rules for classification: Tiebreakers

=== South Korea vs Canada ===
South Korea
5
Hi-Tech Zone Sports Centre Gymnasium Court 3
27 April 2024, 8:30 UTC+8

Canada
0

			1	2	3
1	(South Korea) (Canada)	Jeon Hyeok-jin; Brian Yang	21; 11	21; 5
2	(South Korea) (Canada)	Kang Min-hyuk / Seo Seung-jae; Adam Dong / Nyl Yakura	21; 8	6; 7		retired
3	(South Korea) (Canada)	Cho Geon-yeop; Victor Lai	21; 14	21; 16
4	(South Korea) (Canada)	Ki Dong-ju / Kim Won-ho; Kevin Lee / Ty Alexander Lindeman	21; 15	21; 17
5	(South Korea) (Canada)	Woo Seung-hoon; Imran Wadia	21; 13	21; 8

=== China vs Australia ===
China
5
Hi-Tech Zone Sports Centre Gymnasium Court 1
27 April 2024, 13:00 UTC+8

Australia
0

			1	2	3
1	(China) (Australia)	Shi Yuqi; Ricky Tang	21; 3	21; 13
2	(China) (Australia)	Li Shifeng; Jacob Schueler	21; 11	21; 12
3	(China) (Australia)	Liang Weikeng / Wang Chang; Kenneth Choo / Tang Huaidong	21; 15	21; 7
4	(China) (Australia)	Lu Guangzu; Jack Yu	21; 10	21; 11
5	(China) (Australia)	Liu Yuchen / Ou Xuanyi; Ricky Tang / Rayne Wang	21; 9	21; 6

=== South Korea vs Australia ===
South Korea
5
Hi-Tech Zone Sports Centre Gymnasium Court 4
28 April 2024, 13:00 UTC+8

Australia
0

			1	2	3
1	(South Korea) (Australia)	Cho Geon-yeop; Ricky Tang	21; 3	21; 7
2	(South Korea) (Australia)	Kang Min-hyuk / Seo Seung-jae; Ricky Tang / Rayne Wang	21; 10	21; 16
3	(South Korea) (Australia)	Lee Yun-gyu; Jack Yu	21; 12	21; 16
4	(South Korea) (Australia)	Jin Yong / Ki Dong-ju; Kenneth Choo / Jacob Schueler	21; 10	21; 8
5	(South Korea) (Australia)	Min Seon Jeong; Shrey Dhand	21; 10	21; 14

=== China vs Canada ===
China
5
Hi-Tech Zone Sports Centre Gymnasium Court 1
28 April 2024, 18:00 UTC+8

Canada
0

			1	2	3
1	(China) (Canada)	Shi Yuqi; Brian Yang	21; 9	21; 14
2	(China) (Canada)	Liang Weikeng / Wang Chang; Kevin Lee / Ty Alexander Lindeman	21; 9	21; 18
3	(China) (Canada)	Li Shifeng; Victor Lai	21; 9	21; 14
4	(China) (Canada)	He Jiting / Ren Xiangyu; Imran Wadia / Nyl Yakura	21; 10	21; 13
5	(China) (Canada)	Weng Hongyang; Joshua Nguyen	21; 5	21; 8

=== Canada vs Australia ===
Canada
3
Hi-Tech Zone Sports Centre Gymnasium, Court 3
30 April 2024, 9:30 UTC+8

Australia
2

			1	2	3
1	(Canada) (Australia)	Brian Yang; Ricky Tang	21; 16	21; 8
2	(Canada) (Australia)	Imran Wadia; Jacob Schueler	15; 21	21; 16	16; 21
3	(Canada) (Australia)	Joshua Nguyen; Jack Yu	21; 17	11; 21	19; 21
4	(Canada) (Australia)	Victor Lai / Nyl Yakura; Tang Huaidong / Rayne Wang	21; 13	21; 12
5	(Canada) (Australia)	Kevin Lee / Ty Alexander Lindeman; Kenneth Choo / Jack Yu	21; 16	21; 19

=== China vs South Korea ===
China
3
Hi-Tech Zone Sports Centre Gymnasium, Court 1
30 April 2024, 17:00 UTC+8

South Korea
2

			1	2	3
1	(China) (South Korea)	Shi Yuqi; Jeon Hyeok-jin	14; 21	21; 17	21; 7
2	(China) (South Korea)	Liang Weikeng / Wang Chang; Kang Min-hyuk / Seo Seung-jae	16; 21	21; 15	15; 21
3	(China) (South Korea)	Li Shifeng; Lee Yun-gyu	21; 15	21; 9
4	(China) (South Korea)	Liu Yuchen / Ou Xuanyi; Ki Dong-ju / Kim Won-ho	21; 17	17; 21	21; 23
5	(China) (South Korea)	Lu Guangzu; Woo Seung-hoon	21; 10	21; 15

== Group B ==
Pos	Team	Pld	W	L	MF	MA	MD	GF	GA	GD	PF	PA	PD	Pts	Qualification
1	Japan	3	3	0	15	0	+15	30	4	+26	700	511	+189	3	Advance to quarter-finals
2	Chinese Taipei	3	2	1	8	7	+1	20	17	+3	720	646	+74	2	Advance to quarter-finals
3	Germany	3	1	2	4	11	−7	12	23	−11	604	687	−83	1	
4	Czech Republic	3	0	3	3	12	−9	8	26	−18	509	689	−180	0	

Source: Tournament software
Rules for classification: Tiebreakers

=== Japan vs Czech Republic ===
Japan
5
Hi-Tech Zone Sports Centre Gymnasium Court 2
28 April 2024, 08:30 UTC+8

Czech Republic
0

			1	2	3
1	(Japan) (Czech Republic)	Kenta Nishimoto; Jan Louda	19; 21	22; 20	21; 13
2	(Japan) (Czech Republic)	Koki Watanabe; Jiří Král	21; 12	21; 13
3	(Japan) (Czech Republic)	Akira Koga / Taichi Saito; Ondřej Král / Adam Mendrek	21; 13	21; 12
4	(Japan) (Czech Republic)	Kento Momota; Dominik Kopřiva	21; 9	21; 3
5	(Japan) (Czech Republic)	Kenya Mitsuhashi / Hiroki Okamura; Jiří Král / Tomáš Švejda	21; 11	21; 13

=== Chinese Taipei vs Germany ===
Chinese Taipei
4
Hi-Tech Zone Sports Centre Gymnasium Court 3
28 April 2024, 13:00 UTC+8

Germany
1

			1	2	3
1	(Chinese Taipei) (Germany)	Chou Tien-chen; Kai Schäfer	21; 13	16; 21	21; 12
2	(Chinese Taipei) (Germany)	Lee Yang / Wang Chi-lin; Bjarne Geiss / Jan Colin Völker	21; 13	21; 19
3	(Chinese Taipei) (Germany)	Lin Chun-yi; Fabian Roth	19; 21	22; 20	21; 18
4	(Chinese Taipei) (Germany)	Lee Jhe-huei / Yang Po-hsuan; Daniel Hess / Marvin Seidel	19; 21	22; 24
5	(Chinese Taipei) (Germany)	Wang Tzu-wei; Matthias Kicklitz	16; 21	21; 13	21; 17

=== Japan vs Germany ===
Japan
5
Hi-Tech Zone Sports Centre Gymnasium Court 1
29 April 2024, 17:00 UTC+8

Germany
0

			1	2	3
1	(Japan) (Germany)	Kodai Naraoka; Kai Schäfer	21; 18	21; 16
2	(Japan) (Germany)	Takuro Hoki / Yugo Kobayashi; Marvin Seidel / Jan Colin Völker	21; 14	21; 14
3	(Japan) (Germany)	Koki Watanabe; Fabian Roth	21; 17	21; 13
4	(Japan) (Germany)	Kenya Mitsuhashi / Hiroki Okamura; Bjarne Geiss / Kenneth Neumann	21; 15	21; 14
5	(Japan) (Germany)	Kento Momota; Matthias Kicklitz	21; 14	21; 7

=== Chinese Taipei vs Czech Republic ===
Chinese Taipei
4
Hi-Tech Zone Sports Centre Gymnasium Court 3
29 April 2024, 17:00 UTC+8

Czech Republic
1

			1	2	3
1	(Chinese Taipei) (Czech Republic)	Lin Chun-yi; Jan Louda	21; 13	21; 12
2	(Chinese Taipei) (Czech Republic)	Wang Tzu-wei; Jiří Král	22; 24	21; 10	19; 21
3	(Chinese Taipei) (Czech Republic)	Lee Jhe-huei / Yang Po-hsuan; Ondřej Král / Adam Mendrek	21; 16	21; 16
4	(Chinese Taipei) (Czech Republic)	Lee Chia-hao; Dominik Kopřiva	21; 10	21; 9
5	(Chinese Taipei) (Czech Republic)	Lee Yang / Ye Hong-wei; Jiří Král / Tomáš Švejda	21; 11	21; 11

=== Japan vs Chinese Taipei ===
Japan
5
Hi-Tech Zone Sports Centre Gymnasium Court 2
1 May 2024, 17:00 UTC+8

Chinese Taipei
0

			1	2	3
1	(Japan) (Chinese Taipei)	Kenta Nishimoto; Chou Tien-chen	21; 18	15; 21	21; 15
2	(Japan) (Chinese Taipei)	Takuro Hoki / Yugo Kobayashi; Wang Chi-lin / Yang Po-hsuan	19; 21	21; 12	21; 15
3	(Japan) (Chinese Taipei)	Koki Watanabe; Lin Chun-yi	21; 16	21; 19
4	(Japan) (Chinese Taipei)	Akira Koga / Taichi Saito; Lee Yang / Ye Hong-wei	21; 19	21; 17
5	(Japan) (Chinese Taipei)	Kento Momota; Lee Chia-hao	21; 18	16; 21	21; 17

=== Germany vs Czech Republic ===
Germany
3
Hi-Tech Zone Sports Centre Gymnasium Court 4
1 May 2024, 17:00 UTC+8

Czech Republic
2

			1	2	3
1	(Germany) (Czech Republic)	Fabian Roth; Jan Louda	18; 21	9; 21
2	(Germany) (Czech Republic)	Matthias Kicklitz; Jiří Král	15; 21	21; 17	20; 22
3	(Germany) (Czech Republic)	Kenneth Neumann / Marvin Seidel; Adam Mendrek / Tomáš Švejda	21; 17	21; 10
4	(Germany) (Czech Republic)	Samuel Hsiao; Dominik Kopřiva	21; 15	21; 19
5	(Germany) (Czech Republic)	Bjarne Geiss / Jan Colin Völker; Jiří Král / Ondřej Král	20; 22	21; 13	21; 18

== Group C ==
Pos	Team	Pld	W	L	MF	MA	MD	GF	GA	GD	PF	PA	PD	Pts	Qualification
1	Indonesia	3	3	0	13	2	+11	28	9	+19	735	598	+137	3	Advance to quarter-finals
2	India	3	2	1	10	5	+5	23	14	+9	733	645	+88	2	Advance to quarter-finals
3	Thailand	3	1	2	6	9	−3	15	20	−5	595	670	−75	1	
4	England	3	0	3	1	14	−13	5	28	−23	530	680	−150	0	

Source: Tournament software
Rules for classification: Tiebreakers

=== Indonesia vs England ===
Indonesia
5
Hi-Tech Zone Sports Centre Gymnasium Court 1
27 April 2024, 18:00 UTC+8

England
0

			1	2	3
1	(Indonesia) (England)	Anthony Sinisuka Ginting; Harry Huang	21; 8	21; 15
2	(Indonesia) (England)	Fajar Alfian / Muhammad Rian Ardianto; Ben Lane / Sean Vendy	21; 18	21; 12
3	(Indonesia) (England)	Jonatan Christie; Nadeem Dalvi	21; 16	21; 12
4	(Indonesia) (England)	Muhammad Shohibul Fikri / Bagas Maulana; Callum Hemming / Ethan van Leeuwen	16; 21	21; 14	21; 13
5	(Indonesia) (England)	Alwi Farhan; Cholan Kayan	21; 15	21; 12

=== India vs Thailand ===
India
4
Hi-Tech Zone Sports Centre Gymnasium Court 2
27 April 2024, 18:00 UTC+8

Thailand
1

			1	2	3
1	(India) (Thailand)	Prannoy H. S. Kunlavut Vitidsarn	20; 22	14; 21
2	(India) (Thailand)	Satwiksairaj Rankireddy / Chirag Shetty; Peeratchai Sukphun / Pakkapon Teeraratsakul	21; 19	19; 21	21; 12
3	(India) (Thailand)	Lakshya Sen; Panitchaphon Teeraratsakul	21; 12	19; 21	21; 12
4	(India) (Thailand)	Arjun M. R. / Dhruv Kapila; Tanadon Punpanich / Wachirawit Sothon	21; 19	21; 15
5	(India) (Thailand)	Srikanth Kidambi; Saran Jamsri	21; 9	21; 5

=== Indonesia vs Thailand ===
Indonesia
4
Hi-Tech Zone Sports Centre Gymnasium Court 2
29 April 2024, 9:30 UTC+8

Thailand
1

			1	2	3
1	(Indonesia) (Thailand)	Anthony Sinisuka Ginting; Panitchaphon Teeraratsakul	21; 16	21; 13
2	(Indonesia) (Thailand)	Fajar Alfian / Muhammad Rian Ardianto; Peeratchai Sukphun / Pakkapon Teeraratsakul	19; 21	21; 14	11; 21
3	(Indonesia) (Thailand)	Jonatan Christie; Saran Jamsri	21; 16	13; 21	21; 12
4	(Indonesia) (Thailand)	Leo Rolly Carnando / Daniel Marthin; Sirawit Sothon / Natthapat Trinkajee	21; 13	21; 10
5	(Indonesia) (Thailand)	Chico Aura Dwi Wardoyo; Nachakorn Pusri	21; 10	21; 11

=== India vs England ===
India
5
Hi-Tech Zone Sports Centre Gymnasium Court 3
29 April 2024, 9:30 UTC+8

England
0

			1	2	3
1	(India) (England)	Prannoy H. S. Harry Huang	21; 15	21; 15
2	(India) (England)	Satwiksairaj Rankireddy / Chirag Shetty; Ben Lane / Sean Vendy	21; 17	19; 21	21; 15
3	(India) (England)	Srikanth Kidambi; Nadeem Dalvi	21; 16	21; 11
4	(India) (England)	Arjun M. R. / Dhruv Kapila; Rory Easton / Alex Green	21; 17	21; 19
5	(India) (England)	Kiran George; Cholan Kayan	21; 18	21; 12

=== Indonesia vs India ===
Indonesia
4
Hi-Tech Zone Sports Centre Gymnasium Court 1
1 May 2024, 17:00 UTC+8

India
1

			1	2	3
1	(Indonesia) (India)	Anthony Sinisuka Ginting; Prannoy H. S.	21; 13	12; 21	12; 21
2	(Indonesia) (India)	Muhammad Shohibul Fikri / Bagas Maulana; Satwiksairaj Rankireddy / Chirag Shetty	24; 22	22; 24	21; 19
3	(Indonesia) (India)	Jonatan Christie; Lakshya Sen	21; 18	16; 21	21; 17
4	(Indonesia) (India)	Leo Rolly Carnando / Daniel Marthin; Dhruv Kapila / Sai Pratheek	22; 20	21; 11
5	(Indonesia) (India)	Chico Aura Dwi Wardoyo; Srikanth Kidambi	19; 21	24; 22	21; 14

=== Thailand vs England ===
Thailand
4
Hi-Tech Zone Sports Centre Gymnasium Court 3
1 May 2024, 17:00 UTC+8

England
1

			1	2	3
1	(Thailand) (England)	Kunlavut Vitidsarn; Harry Huang	21; 14	21; 14
2	(Thailand) (England)	Peeratchai Sukphun / Pakkapon Teeraratsakul; Ben Lane / Sean Vendy	15; 21	21; 18	21; 18
3	(Thailand) (England)	Panitchaphon Teeraratsakul; Nadeem Dalvi	21; 17	21; 13
4	(Thailand) (England)	Tanadon Punpanich / Wachirawit Sothon; Rory Easton / Callum Hemming	16; 21	21; 23
5	(Thailand) (England)	Saran Jamsri; Cholan Kayan	26; 24	21; 15

== Group D ==
Pos	Team	Pld	W	L	MF	MA	MD	GF	GA	GD	PF	PA	PD	Pts	Qualification
1	Denmark	3	3	0	13	2	+11	27	7	+20	700	469	+231	3	Advance to quarter-finals
2	Malaysia	3	2	1	12	3	+9	25	9	+16	669	541	+128	2	Advance to quarter-finals
3	Hong Kong	3	1	2	5	10	−5	14	20	−6	591	599	−8	1	
4	Algeria	3	0	3	0	15	−15	0	30	−30	279	630	−351	0	

Source: Tournament software
Rules for classification: Tiebreakers

=== Malaysia vs Hong Kong ===
Malaysia
5
Hi-Tech Zone Sports Centre Gymnasium Court 2
27 April 2024, 08:30 UTC+8

Hong Kong
0

			1	2	3
1	(Malaysia) (Hong Kong)	Lee Zii Jia; Lee Cheuk Yiu	21; 18	21; 18
2	(Malaysia) (Hong Kong)	Aaron Chia / Soh Wooi Yik; Law Cheuk Him / Yeung Shing Choi	21; 16	21; 12
3	(Malaysia) (Hong Kong)	Leong Jun Hao; Ng Ka Long	17; 21	21; 12	21; 15
4	(Malaysia) (Hong Kong)	Goh Sze Fei / Nur Izzuddin; Lee Chun Hei / Tang Chun Man	21; 19	21; 18
5	(Malaysia) (Hong Kong)	Justin Hoh; Chan Yin Chak	21; 17	19; 21	21; 17

=== Denmark vs Algeria ===
Denmark
5
Hi-Tech Zone Sports Centre Gymnasium Court 3
27 April 2024, 13:00 UTC+8

Algeria
0

			1	2	3
1	(Denmark) (Algeria)	Viktor Axelsen; Adel Hamek	21; 5	21; 6
2	(Denmark) (Algeria)	Anders Antonsen; Youcef Sabri Medel	21; 13	21; 12
3	(Denmark) (Algeria)	Rasmus Gemke; Mohamed Abderrahime Belarbi	21; 4	21; 4
4	(Denmark) (Algeria)	Kim Astrup / Anders Skaarup Rasmussen; Koceila Mammeri / Youcef Sabri Medel	21; 12	21; 10
5	(Denmark) (Algeria)	Rasmus Kjær / Frederik Søgaard; Mohamed Abderrahime Belarbi / Adel Hamek	21; 6	21; 7

=== Denmark vs Hong Kong ===
Denmark
5
Hi-Tech Zone Sports Centre Gymnasium Court 1
28 April 2024, 13:00 UTC+8

Hong Kong
0

			1	2	3
1	(Denmark) (Hong Kong)	Viktor Axelsen; Lee Cheuk Yiu	21; 14	18; 21	21; 19
2	(Denmark) (Hong Kong)	Kim Astrup / Anders Skaarup Rasmussen; Law Cheuk Him / Yeung Shing Choi	21; 13	21; 7
3	(Denmark) (Hong Kong)	Anders Antonsen; Ng Ka Long	21; 16	21; 7
4	(Denmark) (Hong Kong)	Rasmus Kjær / Frederik Søgaard; Lee Chun Hei / Tang Chun Man	21; 10	19; 21	21; 16
5	(Denmark) (Hong Kong)	Rasmus Gemke; Jason Gunawan	21; 11	21; 12

=== Malaysia vs Algeria ===
Malaysia
5
Hi-Tech Zone Sports Centre Gymnasium Court 4
28 April 2024, 18:00 UTC+8

Algeria
0

			1	2	3
1	(Malaysia) (Algeria)	Lee Zii Jia; Adel Hamek	21; 8	21; 6
2	(Malaysia) (Algeria)	Cheam June Wei; Youcef Sabri Medel	21; 9	21; 14
3	(Malaysia) (Algeria)	Choong Hon Jian / Muhammad Haikal; Sifeddine Larbaoui / Mohamed Abdelaziz Ouchefoun	21; 8	21; 3
4	(Malaysia) (Algeria)	Justin Hoh; Mohamed Abderrahime Belarbi	21; 10	21; 14
5	(Malaysia) (Algeria)	Nur Izzuddin / Soh Wooi Yik; Koceila Mammeri / Youcef Sabri Medel	21; 13	21; 9

=== Hong Kong vs Algeria ===
Hong Kong
5
Hi-Tech Zone Sports Centre Gymnasium Court 4
30 April 2024, 9:30 UTC+8

Algeria
0

			1	2	3
1	(Hong Kong) (Algeria)	Ng Ka Long; Adel Hamek	21; 10	21; 16
2	(Hong Kong) (Algeria)	Chan Yin Chak; Mohamed Abdelaziz Ouchefoun	21; 3	21; 5
3	(Hong Kong) (Algeria)	Jason Gunawan; Mohamed Abderrahime Belarbi	21; 11	21; 14
4	(Hong Kong) (Algeria)	Hung Kuei Chun / Lui Chun Wai; Sifeddine Larbaoui / Mohamed Abdelaziz Ouchefoun	21; 12	21; 13
5	(Hong Kong) (Algeria)	Lee Chun Hei / Yeung Shing Choi; Mohamed Abderrahime Belarbi / Adel Hamek	21; 7	21; 15

=== Denmark vs Malaysia ===
Denmark
3
Hi-Tech Zone Sports Centre Gymnasium Court 1
30 April 2024, 17:00 UTC+8

Malaysia
2

			1	2	3
1	(Denmark) (Malaysia)	Viktor Axelsen; Lee Zii Jia	21; 16	24; 22
2	(Denmark) (Malaysia)	Kim Astrup / Anders Skaarup Rasmussen; Aaron Chia / Soh Wooi Yik	21; 17	17; 21	16; 21
3	(Denmark) (Malaysia)	Anders Antonsen; Leong Jun Hao	21; 14	21; 10
4	(Denmark) (Malaysia)	Rasmus Kjær / Frederik Søgaard; Goh Sze Fei / Nur Izzuddin	21; 23	20; 22
5	(Denmark) (Malaysia)	Rasmus Gemke; Justin Hoh	21; 13	19; 21	21; 13
