= 2017 Badminton Asia Junior Championships – Boys' singles =

Tournament details
- Dates: 26–30 July 2017
- Edition: 20
- Venue: Jaya Raya Sports Hall Training Center
- Location: Jakarta, Indonesia

The boys' singles tournament of the 2017 Asian Junior Badminton Championships was held from July 26 to 30. The defending champions of the last edition was Sun Feixiang from China. Leong Jun Hao of Malaysia emerged as the champion after beating Bai Yupeng of China in the final with the score 21-6, 20-22, 21-17.

== Men's singles ==
=== Seeds ===
1. (India) Lakshya Sen (fourth round)
2. (Chinese Taipei) Lee Chia-hao (fourth round)
3. (Thailand) Kunlavut Vitidsarn (semifinals)
4. (Chinese Taipei) Chen Chi-ting (semifinals)
5. (Kazakhstan) Dmitriy Panarin (second round)
6. (Malaysia) Leong Jun Hao (champion)
7. (Thailand) Pacharaapol Nipornram (fourth round)
8. (Malaysia) Sim Fong Hau (fourth round)
9. (Hong Kong) Chan Yin Chak (second round)
10. (South Korea) Kim Moon-jun (third round)
11. (Thailand) Saran Jamsri (third round)
12. (Chinese Taipei) Chen Shiau-cheng (fourth round)
13. (South Korea) Woo Seung-hoon (third round)
14. (Thailand) Ruttanapak Oupthong (fourth round)
15. (India) Kartikey Gulshan Kumar (fourth round)
16. (Indonesia) Ikhsan Rumbay (quarterfinals)

=== Draw ===
==== Finals ====
Quarterfinals
(Chinese Taipei) Lin Chun-yi	18	21	15
(China) Bai Yupeng	21	18	21
4	(Chinese Taipei) Chen Chi-ting	15	21	20
16	(Indonesia) Ikhsan Rumbay	21	9	8^{r}
(China) Li Shifeng	13	16
3	(Thailand) Kunlavut Vitidsarn	21	21
6	(Malaysia) Leong Jun Hao	15	21	21
(China) Gu Junfeng	21	16	13

Semifinals
(China) Bai Yupeng	21	21
4	(Chinese Taipei) Chen Chi-ting	13	13
3	(Thailand) Kunlavut Vitidsarn	21	14	21
6	(Malaysia) Leong Jun Hao	19	21	23

Final
(China) Bai Yupeng	6	22	17
6	(Malaysia) Leong Jun Hao	21	20	21

=== Top half ===
==== Section 1 ====
First round
(Pakistan) S Riaz	8	4
(Chinese Taipei) Lin C-y	21	21

Second round
1	(India) L Sen	21	21
(Singapore) J Tan	9	9
(Vietnam) Vu M P	14	21	20
(Sri Lanka) S Gunatilleke	21	17	22
11	(Thailand) S Jamsri	21	21
(South Korea) Shin T-y	19	18
(Macau) Lam H H	9	8
(Chinese Taipei) Lin C-y	21	21

Third round
1	(India) L Sen	21	21
(Sri Lanka) S Gunatilleke	11	9
11	(Thailand) S Jamsri	11	13
(Chinese Taipei) Lin C-y	21	21

Fourth round
1	(India) L Sen	21	23	20
(Chinese Taipei) Lin C-y	13	25	22

==== Section 2 ====
First round
(Uzbekistan) T Turakhonov	21	21
(Iraq) M Talib	15	13
(Nepal) P Maharjan	21	21
(Cambodia) D Saom	11	6

Second round
8	(Malaysia) Sim F H	21	21
(Myanmar) Aung M H	16	11
(Mongolia) S Enkhbat	w	/	o
(Uzbekistan) T Turakhonov
9	(Hong Kong) Chan Y C	22	21	10
(China) Bai YP	24	15	21
(Indonesia) F Fauzi	21	21
(Nepal) P Maharjan	11	16

Third round
8	(Malaysia) Sim F H	21	21
(Uzbekistan) T Turakhonov	3	6
(China) Bai YP	21	18	21
(Indonesia) F Fauzi	14	21	14

Fourth round
8	(Malaysia) Sim F H	18	11
(China) Bai YP	21	21

==== Section 3 ====
First round
(Vietnam) Nguyen X M	19	21	19
(Hong Kong) Mak P N	21	16	21
(Myanmar) Kaung M H	3	3
(Malaysia) Chia W J	21	21

Second round
4	(Chinese Taipei) Chen C-t	20	21	21
(China) Gao ZZ	22	15	16
(Iraq) M Nabeel	10	8
(Hong Kong) Mak P N	21	21
10	(South Korea) Kim M-j	21	21
(Macau) Ao F L	9	6
(Indonesia) A A Yulianto	21	21
(Malaysia) Chia W J	13	14

Third round
4	(Chinese Taipei) Chen C-t	21	21
(Hong Kong) Mak P N	16	12
10	(South Korea) Kim M-j	19	19
(Indonesia) A A Yulianto	21	21

Fourth round
4	(Chinese Taipei) Chen C-t	21	21
(Indonesia) A A Yulianto	12	15

==== Section 4 ====
First round
(Cambodia) Heng M L	19	14
(Sri Lanka) C Dias	21	21
(Pakistan) S D Ali	17	21	21
(Iran) A Hosseinkhani	21	19	16

Second round
7	(Thailand) P Nipornram	6	21	21
(India) A D Gupta	21	5	10
(Singapore) J Koh	21	21
(Sri Lanka) C Dias	9	4
16	(Indonesia) I Rumbay	21	21
(Philippines) A S Salvado	8	13
(Kazakhstan) I Yuldashev	21	21
(Pakistan) S D Ali	11	15

Third round
7	(Thailand) P Nipornram	21	21
(Singapore) J Koh	13	10
16	(Indonesia) I Rumbay	21	21
(Kazakhstan) I Yuldashev	6	7

Fourth round
7	(Thailand) P Nipornram	13	18
16	(Indonesia) I Rumbay	21	21

=== Bottom half ===
==== Section 5 ====
First round
(Indonesia) M R Diaz	21	21
(Philippines) S Padiz Jr	16	12
(Hong Kong) Ko S H	17	15
(China) Li SF	21	21

Second round
(Indonesia) M R Diaz	21	21
(South Korea) Park H-s	15	17
(Cambodia) Sum S S	4	5
15	(India) K G Kumar	21	21
(China) Li SF	21	18	21
(Singapore) D M Ng	10	21	9
(Malaysia) Ng T Y	21	21
5	(Kazakhstan) D Panarin	14	14

Third round
(Indonesia) M R Diaz	14	13
15	(India) K G Kumar	21	21
(China) Li SF	22	21
(Malaysia) Ng T Y	20	15

Fourth round
15	(India) K G Kumar	17	17
(China) Li SF	21	21

==== Section 6 ====
First round
(Nepal) P K Lingthen	15	21	21
(Pakistan) R M Z Haider	21	15	17
(Myanmar) Arkar P M	21	21
(Iraq) Y Alhumairi	4	5

Second round
(Nepal) P K Lingthen	8	15
(Sri Lanka) R Sasindu	21	21
(Indonesia) N T A Kurniawan	15	14
12	(Chinese Taipei) Chen S-c	21	21
(Myanmar) Arkar P M	14	19
(Vietnam) Nguyen H D	21	21
(Uzbekistan) A Khadjaev	10	7
3	(Thailand) K Vitidsarn	21	21

Third round
(Sri Lanka) R Sasindu	14	7
12	(Chinese Taipei) Chen S-c	21	21
(Vietnam) Nguyen H D	11	13
3	(Thailand) K Vitidsarn	21	21

Fourth round
12	(Chinese Taipei) Chen S-c	15	21	6
3	(Thailand) K Vitidsarn	21	7	21

==== Section 7 ====
First round
(Iraq) K Hussein	19	21
(Cambodia) Oeng P L	21	23
(Pakistan) A B Khan	7	13
(Vietnam) Le T L	21	21

Second round
(Cambodia) Oeng P L	11	8
(Macau) Pui P F	21	21
(Iran) A Jabbari	7	12
14	(Thailand) R Oupthong	21	21
(Vietnam) Le T L	23	10	5
(Indonesia) G P F Cupu	21	21	21
(Philippines) L R Zafra	18	13
6	(Malaysia) Leong J H	21	21

Third round
(Macau) Pui P F	8	11
14	(Thailand) R Oupthong	21	21
(Indonesia) G P F Cupu	21	18	8
6	(Malaysia) Leong J H	11	21	21

Fourth round
14	(Thailand) R Oupthong	16	14
6	(Malaysia) Leong J H	21	21

==== Section 8 ====
First round
(Singapore) H Wong	21	21	12
(Hong Kong) Chow H L	17	23	21
(Nepal) R Maharjan	21	21
(Mongolia) M Batsukh	8	7

Second round
(Hong Kong) Chow H L	9	12
(China) Gu JF	21	21
(India) J Dandu	12	16
13	(South Korea) Woo S-h	21	21
(Nepal) R Maharjan	13	15
(Sri Lanka) R Hendahewa	21	21
(Myanmar) Hein S T T	9	9
2	(Chinese Taipei) Lee C-h	21	21

Third round
(China) Gu JF	21	21
13	(South Korea) Woo S-h	9	16
(Sri Lanka) R Hendahewa	9	7
2	(Chinese Taipei) Lee C-h	21	21

Fourth round
(China) Gu JF	8	21	21
2	(Chinese Taipei) Lee C-h	21	4	13
