= Chen Chi-ting =

Taiwanese badminton player

Chen Chi-ting 陳紀廷
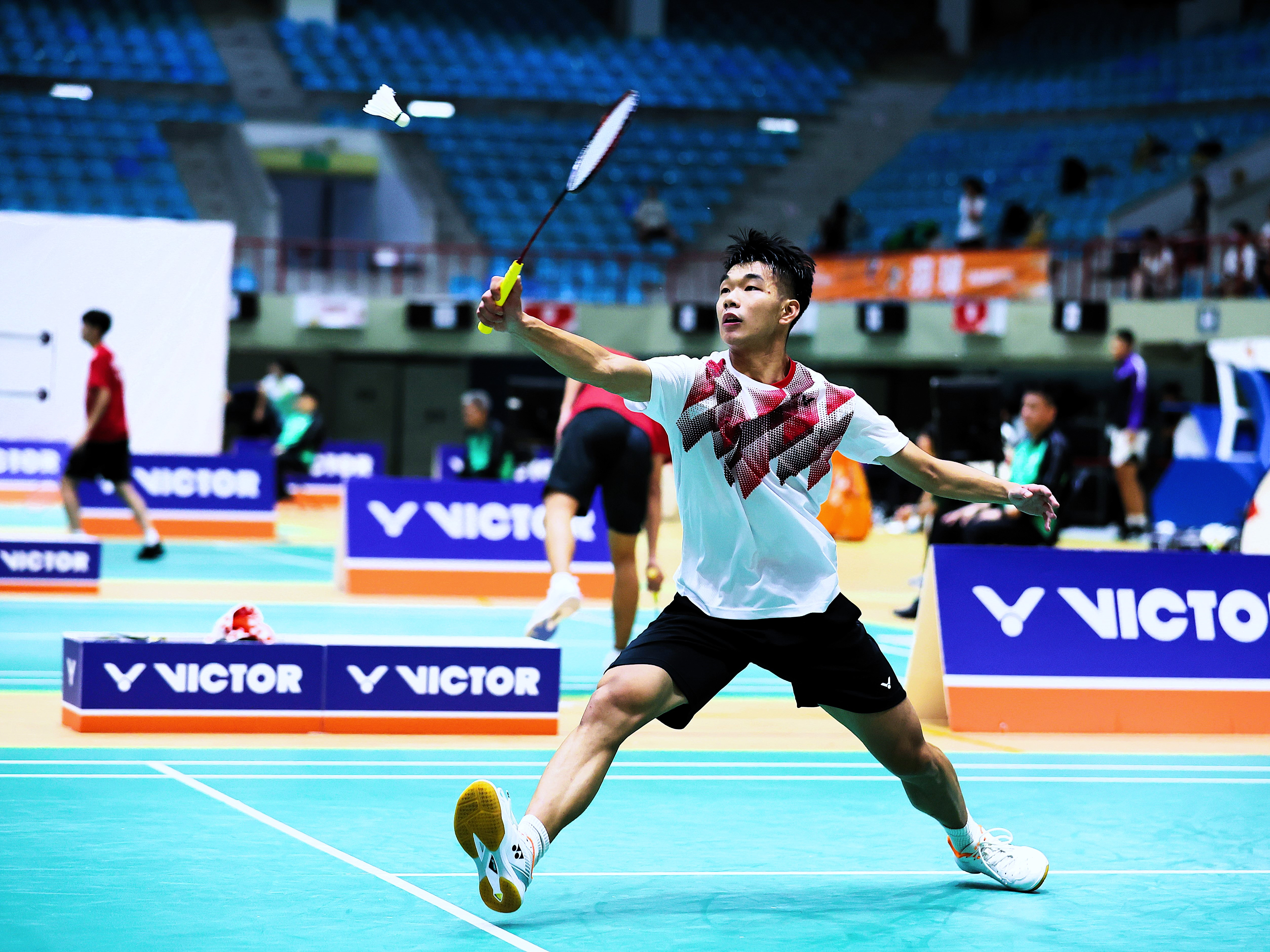

Personal information
- Born: 1 September 1999 (age 27) Taiwan

Sport
- Country: Taiwan
- Sport: Badminton

Men's singles
- Career record: 75 wins, 32 losses
- Highest ranking: 83 (2 May 2023)
- BWF profile
Medal record
Men's badminton
Representing Chinese Taipei
Asian Junior Championships
Bronze medal – third place	2017 Jakarta	Boys' singles

Chen Chi-ting (Chinese: 陳紀廷; pinyin: Chén Jìtíng; born 1 September 1999) is a Taiwanese badminton player. Chen who educated in Kaohsiung middle school, was the winner of Asian Junior U–17 Championships in 2015, and later won the bronze medal in the U–19 Championships in 2017. He captured the boys' singles title at the 2017 Dutch Junior Grand Prix tournament.

== Achievements ==
=== Asian Junior Championships ===
Boys' singles
Year	Venue	Opponent	Score	Result
2017	Jaya Raya Sports Hall Training Center; Jakarta, Indonesia	(China) Bai Yupeng	13–21, 13–21	Bronze

=== BWF International Challenge/Series (1 title, 2 runners-up) ===
Men's singles
Year	Tournament	Opponent	Score	Result
2019	Norwegian International	(Chinese Taipei) Lin Yu-hsien	14–21, 13–21	(silver) Runner-up
2024	Norwegian International	(Sweden) Romeo Makboul	21–18, 21–17	(gold) Winner
2025	Norwegian International	(Chinese Taipei) Chiang Tzu-chieh	18–21, 17–21	(silver) Runner-up

BWF International Challenge tournament
BWF International Series tournament
BWF Future Series tournament

=== BWF Junior International (1 title, 2 runners-up) ===
Boys' singles
Year	Tournament	Opponent	Score	Result
2016	Korea Junior International	(South Korea) Woo Seung-hoon	11–5, 5–11, 7–11, 11–5, 9–11	(silver) Runner-up
2017	Dutch Junior International	(Hong Kong) Chan Yin Chak	21–10, 21–14	(gold) Winner

Mixed doubles
Year	Tournament	Partner	Opponent	Score	Result
2017	Australian Junior International	(Chinese Taipei) Lin Jhih-yun	(Chinese Taipei) Ye Hong-wei (Chinese Taipei) Teng Chun-hsun	18–21, 17–21	(silver) Runner-up

BWF Junior International Grand Prix tournament
BWF Junior International Challenge tournament
BWF Junior International Series tournament
BWF Junior Future Series tournament
