= Priya Konjengbam =

Indian badminton player (born 2001)

Personal information
- Born: Priya Devi Konjengbam; 11 March 2001 (age 25) Manipur, India

Sport
- Country: India
- Sport: Badminton
- Coached by: Pradeep Raju

Women's & mixed doubles
- Highest ranking: 37 (WD with Shruti Mishra, 13 May 2025); 82 (XD with Bokka Navaneeth, 18 July 2023)
- Current ranking: 47 (WD with Shruti Mishra, 3 November 2026)
- BWF profile
Medal record
Women's badminton
Representing India
Asia Team Championships
Gold medal – first place	2024 Selangor	Women's team

Priya Devi Konjengbam (born 11 March 2001) is an Indian badminton player. She is affiliated with Suchitra Badminton Academy.

She was part of the Indian women's team that won gold at the 2024 Badminton Asia Team Championships. She was also part of India's 2024 Uber Cup squad.

== Achievements ==
=== BWF International Challenge/Series (1 title, 3 runners-up) ===
Women's doubles
Year	Tournament	Partner	Opponent	Score	Result
2023 (I)	India International	(India) Shruti Mishra	(Japan) Miku Shigeta (Japan) Maya Taguchi	21–17, 18–21, 15–21	(silver) Runner-up
2024 (I)	India International	(India) Shruti Mishra	(India) Arathi Sara Sunil (India) Varshini Viswanath Sri	21–18, 21–13	(gold) Winner
2025 (II)	India International	(India) Shruti Mishra	(Thailand) Hathaithip Mijad (Thailand) Napapakorn Tungkasatan	16–21, 16–21	(silver) Runner-up

Mixed doubles
Year	Tournament	Partner	Opponent	Score	Result
2023 (II)	India International	(India) Dingku Singh Konthoujam	(India) Sathish Kumar Karunakaran (India) Aadya Variyath	10–21, 18–21	(silver) Runner-up

BWF International Challenge tournament
BWF International Series tournament
BWF Future Series tournament
