= Shruti Mishra =

Indian badminton player (born 2002)

Personal information
- Born: 13 August 2002 (age 24) Uttar Pradesh, India

Sport
- Country: India
- Sport: Badminton
- Coached by: Pradeep Raju

Women's and mixed doubles
- Highest ranking: 37 (WD with Priya Konjengbam, 13 May 2025); 64 (XD with Ishaan Bhatnagar, 3 November 2026); 74 (XD with Ayush Agarwal, 5 August 2025)
- Current ranking: 47 (WD with Priya Konjengbam); 64 (XD with Ishaan Bhatnagar) (3 November 2026)
- BWF profile
Medal record
Women's badminton
Representing India
Asia Team Championships
Gold medal – first place	2024 Selangor	Women's team

Shruti Mishra (born 13 August 2002) is an Indian badminton player. She is affiliated with Suchitra Badminton Academy.

She was part of the Indian women's team that won gold at the 2024 Badminton Asia Team Championships. She was also part of India's 2022 and 2024 Uber Cup squad.

== Background ==
Mishra was born on 13 August 2002 in Uttar Pradesh, India. At the age of six, she began training at K. D. Singh Babu Stadium, Lucknow after being forced to play badminton by her father. She initially disliked the sport, but it eventually became her passion.

== Career ==
In 2019, Mishra won her first international title at the Bulgarian Junior International in August. In early 2022, she was the women's doubles runner-up at the 2022 Odisha Open with Sanyogita Ghorpade. In October 2023, she reached the final of India International in Bengaluru, finishing as the runner-up. A few months later, she and partner Priya Konjengbam became the women's doubles national champions after winning the 2023 National Badminton Championships.

== Achievements ==
=== World Tour (1 runner-up) ===
The BWF World Tour, which was announced on 19 March 2017 and implemented in 2018, is a series of elite badminton tournaments sanctioned by the Badminton World Federation (BWF). The BWF World Tour is divided into levels of World Tour Finals, Super 1000, Super 750, Super 500, Super 300 (part of the HSBC World Tour), and the BWF Tour Super 100.

Women's doubles
Year	Tournament	Level	Partner	Opponent	Score	Result
2022	Odisha Open	Super 100	(India) Sanyogita Ghorpade	(India) Treesa Jolly (India) Gayatri Gopichand	12–21, 10–21	(silver) Runner-up

=== International Challenge / Series (3 titles, 2 runners-up) ===
Women's doubles
Year	Tournament	Partner	Opponent	Score	Result
2023 (I)	India International	(India) Priya Konjengbam	(Japan) Miku Shigeta (Japan) Maya Taguchi	21–17, 18–21, 15–21	(silver) Runner-up
2024 (I)	India International	(India) Priya Konjengbam	(India) Arathi Sara Sunil (India) Varshini Viswanath Sri	21–18, 21–13	(gold) Winner
2025 (II)	India International	(India) Priya Konjengbam	(Thailand) Hathaithip Mijad (Thailand) Napapakorn Tungkasatan	16–21, 16–21	(silver) Runner-up

Mixed doubles
Year	Tournament	Partner	Opponent	Score	Result
2026	Uganda International	(India) Ishaan Bhatnagar	(India) Nithin H. V. (India) Srinidhi Narayanan	13–21, 21–19, 1–0 (retired)	(gold) Winner
2026	Réunion Open	(India) Ishaan Bhatnagar	(France) Grégoire Deschamp (Denmark) Iben Bergstein	21–17, 21–19	(gold) Winner

BWF International Challenge tournament
BWF International Series tournament
BWF Future Series tournament

=== Junior International (1 title) ===
Mixed doubles
Year	Tournament	Partner	Opponent	Score	Result
2019	Bulgarian Junior International	(India) Edwin Joy	(England) Brandon Yap (England) Abbygael Harris	21–14, 21–17	(gold) Winner

BWF Junior International Grand Prix tournament
BWF Junior International Challenge tournament
BWF Junior International Series tournament
BWF Junior Future Series tournament
