= Leong Jun Hao =

Malaysian badminton player (born 1999)

Leong Jun Hao 梁峻豪
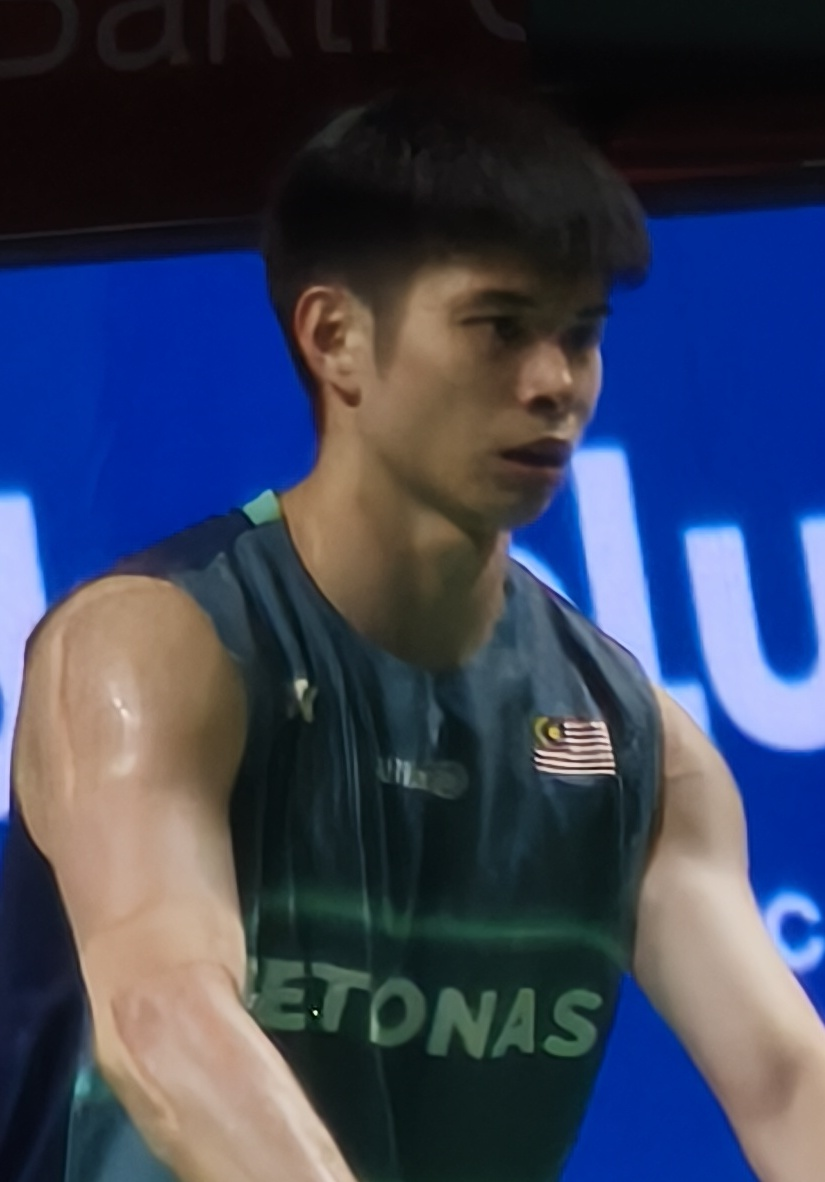
- Leong at the 2026 Indonesia Open

Personal information
- Born: 13 July 1999 (age 27) Setapak, Kuala Lumpur, Malaysia
- Years active: 2016–present
- Height: 1.73 m (5 ft 8 in)

Sport
- Country: Malaysia
- Sport: Badminton
- Handedness: Right
- Coached by: Kenneth Jonassen; Tey Seu Bock

Men's singles
- Highest ranking: 20 (23 September 2025)
- Current ranking: 32 (27 October 2026)
- BWF profile
Medal record
Men's badminton
Representing Malaysia
Thomas Cup
| Bronze medal – third place | 2024 Chengdu | Men's team |
Asia Team Championships
| Gold medal – first place | 2022 Selangor | Men's team |
| Silver medal – second place | 2020 Manila | Men's team |
| Silver medal – second place | 2024 Selangor | Men's team |
SEA Games
| Silver medal – second place | 2023 Cambodia | Men's team |
| Silver medal – second place | 2025 Thailand | Men's team |
| Bronze medal – third place | 2023 Cambodia | Men's singles |
| Bronze medal – third place | 2025 Thailand | Men's singles |
World Junior Championships
| Silver medal – second place | 2016 Bilbao | Mixed team |
| Silver medal – second place | 2017 Yogyakarta | Boys' singles |
| Silver medal – second place | 2017 Yogyakarta | Mixed team |
Asian Junior Championships
| Gold medal – first place | 2017 Jakarta | Boys' singles |
| Bronze medal – third place | 2017 Jakarta | Mixed team |

Leong Jun Hao (Chinese: 梁峻豪; pinyin: Liáng Jùnháo, born 13 July 1999) is a Malaysian badminton player. An Asian junior champion, world junior silver medalist and two-time SEA Games bronze medalist, he won the boys' singles gold medal at the 2017 Badminton Asia Junior Championships and a silver medal at the 2017 BWF World Junior Championships. He subsequently won bronze medals in men's singles at the 2023 and 2025 SEA Games.

At senior level, Leong won his first BWF World Tour title at the 2022 Indonesia Masters Super 100 tournament, followed by another Super 100 title at the 2023 Malaysia Masters. He also reached the final of the 2024 Japan Masters, a Super 500 tournament, finishing runners-up in one of his most significant BWF World Tour appearances.

In team competitions, Leong was part of the Malaysian men's team that won gold at the 2022 Badminton Asia Team Championships and bronze at the 2024 Thomas Cup. He also won silver medals in the men's team events at the 2023 and 2025 SEA Games. During his junior career, his victory at the 2017 Asian Junior Championships and runner-up finish at the 2017 World Junior Championships established him among the leading junior men's singles players of his generation.

== Personal life ==
Leong was born and raised in Kuala Lumpur to Celine Low and Anthony Leong. He started playing badminton for fun outside his house. At the age of 9, he started playing the sport seriously under his father's tutelage. Leong joined the Bukit Jalil Sports School (BJSS) at the age of 13. At the end of 2018, he injured his hip twice which resulted in his world ranking dropping from 40th to 120th.

== Career ==
=== 2017 ===
In July, Leong won the Asian Junior Championships by defeating Bai Yupeng in the final. In October, he reached the final of World Junior Championships where he lost to top seed, Kunlavut Vitidsarn, 21–17, 15–21, 9–21. In November, he reached his maiden senior final at the Malaysia International Challenge before losing to compatriot Iskandar Zulkarnain Zainuddin.

=== 2018 ===
In January, he reached the final of the Thailand Masters as a qualifier where he lost to the second seed, Tommy Sugiarto. In April, he won his first senior title at the Finnish Open by defeating his compatriot Cheam June Wei in the final.

=== 2019–2020 ===
In December 2019, Leong reached his first final of the year at the Bangladesh International but lost out to top seed Lakshya Sen.

He was part of Malaysia's men's team that won silver at the 2020 Asian Team Championships in February 2020.

=== 2022 ===
Leong was one of the players that won gold at the 2022 Asian Team Championships for Malaysia in February. In October, he clinched his first BWF World Tour title at the Indonesia Masters, beating compatriot Cheam June Wei in three games.

=== 2023 ===
In May, Leong made his debut at the 2023 SEA Games where he helped Malaysia win a silver medal in the men's team event. He later competed in the men's singles event and went on to win bronze, losing out to Indonesia's Christian Adinata in the semi-finals. In July, he was crowned as men's singles national champion after winning the 2023 Malaysian National Badminton Championships. In October, he competed at the KL Masters as the second seed. He emerged as the winner after defeating top seed Lee Chia-hao 22–20, 21–13 in the final.

=== 2024 ===
In November, Leong reached the final of the Japan Masters, his first of a Super 500 level tournament. He finished as the runner-up, losing 10–21, 13–21 to Li Shifeng.

=== 2025 ===
In 2025, Leong participated in the SEA Games in Thailand. He won a silver medal in the team event and a bronze in the men's singles, repeating his achievements from 2 years earlier in Cambodia.

== Achievements ==
=== Southeast Asian Games ===
Men's singles
| Year | Venue | Opponent | Score | Result | Ref. |
|---|---|---|---|---|---|
| 2023 | Morodok Techo Badminton Hall; Phnom Penh, Cambodia | (Indonesia) Christian Adinata | 19–21, 12–21 | Bronze | |
| 2025 | Gymnasium 4, Thammasat University; Pathum Thani, Thailand | (Indonesia) Zaki Ubaidillah | 18–21, 13–21 | Bronze | |

=== BWF World Junior Championships ===
Boys' singles
| Year | Venue | Opponent | Score | Result | Ref. |
|---|---|---|---|---|---|
| 2017 | GOR Among Rogo; Yogyakarta, Indonesia | (Thailand) Kunlavut Vitidsarn | 21–17, 15–21, 9–21 | Silver | |

=== Asian Junior Championships ===
Boys' singles
| Year | Venue | Opponent | Score | Result | Ref. |
|---|---|---|---|---|---|
| 2017 | Jaya Raya Sports Hall Training Center; Jakarta, Indonesia | (China) Bai Yupeng | 21–6, 20–22, 21–17 | Gold | |

=== BWF World Tour (2 titles, 2 runners-up) ===
The BWF World Tour, which was announced on 19 March 2017 and implemented in 2018, is a series of elite badminton tournaments sanctioned by the Badminton World Federation (BWF). The BWF World Tours are divided into levels of World Tour Finals, Super 1000, Super 750, Super 500, Super 300 (part of the HSBC World Tour), and the BWF Tour Super 100.

Men's singles
| Year | Tournament | Level | Opponent | Score | Result | Ref. |
|---|---|---|---|---|---|---|
| 2018 | Thailand Masters | Super 300 | (Indonesia) Tommy Sugiarto | 16–21, 15–21 | (silver) Runner-up | |
| 2022 | Indonesia Masters | Super 100 | (Malaysia) Cheam June Wei | 9–21, 22–20, 21–19 | (gold) Winner | |
| 2023 | Malaysia Super 100 | Super 100 | (Chinese Taipei) Lee Chia-hao | 22–20, 21–13 | (gold) Winner | |
| 2024 | Japan Masters | Super 500 | (China) Li Shifeng | 10–21, 13–21 | (silver) Runner-up | |

=== BWF International Challenge/Series (1 title, 2 runners-up) ===
Men's singles
| Year | Tournament | Opponent | Score | Result | Ref. |
|---|---|---|---|---|---|
| 2017 | Malaysia International | (Malaysia) Iskandar Zulkarnain Zainuddin | 11–21, 13–21 | (silver) Runner-up | |
| 2018 | Finnish Open | (Malaysia) Cheam June Wei | 12–21, 21–17, 22–20 | (gold) Winner | |
| 2019 | Bangladesh International | (India) Lakshya Sen | 20–22, 18–21 | (silver) Runner-up | |

BWF International Challenge tournament
BWF International Series tournament
