= 2024 Thomas & Uber Cup =

Biennial international badminton team championship

2024 Thomas & Uber Cup 2024年汤姆斯杯和尤伯杯

Tournament details
- Dates: 27 April – 5 May 2024
- Edition: 33rd (Thomas Cup); 30th (Uber Cup)
- Level: International
- Nations: 16 (Thomas Cup); 16 (Uber Cup)
- Venue: Hi-Tech Zone Sports Centre Gymnasium
- Location: Chengdu, China
- Official website: bwfthomasubercups.com

The 2024 Thomas & Uber Cup (officially known as the TotalEnergies BWF Thomas & Uber Cup Finals 2024 for sponsorship reasons) was the 33rd edition of the Thomas Cup and the 30th edition of the Uber Cup, the biennial international badminton championship contested by the men and women's national teams of the member associations of Badminton World Federation (BWF). The tournaments were held at Chengdu, China, from 27 April to 5 May 2024.

India were the defending champions for the Thomas Cup, but lost to China in the quarter-finals. South Korea were the defending champions for the Uber Cup, but lost to Indonesia in the semi-finals. China won both tournaments, defeating Indonesia in both finals.

== Qualification ==
China qualified automatically as hosts, while India and South Korea qualified as the title holders for the Thomas and Uber Cup respectively.

=== Thomas Cup ===
Means of qualification	Date	Venue	Slot	Qualified teams
Host country	28 February 2021	Chengdu	1	China
2022 Thomas Cup Champion	5–15 May 2022	Bangkok	1	India
2024 All Africa Team Championships	12–15 February 2024	Cairo	1	Algeria
2024 Asia Team Championships	13–18 February 2024	Shah Alam	3	Malaysia
2024 Asia Team Championships	13–18 February 2024	Shah Alam	3	South Korea
2024 Asia Team Championships	13–18 February 2024	Shah Alam	3	Japan
2024 Pan Am Male & Female Cup	15–18 February 2024	São Paulo	1	Canada
2024 European Team Championships	14–18 February 2024	Łódź	4	Denmark
2024 European Team Championships	14–18 February 2024	Łódź	4	~~France~~^{2}
2024 European Team Championships	14–18 February 2024	Łódź	4	England
2024 European Team Championships	14–18 February 2024	Łódź	4	Germany
2024 European Team Championships	14–18 February 2024	Łódź	4	Czech Republic
2024 Oceania Team Championships	16–18 February 2024	Geelong	1	Australia
World Team Rankings	20 February 2024	Kuala Lumpur	4	Indonesia^{1}
World Team Rankings	20 February 2024	Kuala Lumpur	4	Chinese Taipei
World Team Rankings	20 February 2024	Kuala Lumpur	4	Thailand
World Team Rankings	20 February 2024	Kuala Lumpur	4	Hong Kong
Total			16	

- ^1 Since China, winner of the Asian qualification tournament, had already qualified as host, the spot was given to Indonesia as the best Asian team from World Team Rankings.
- ^2 On the day of the official draw, it was revealed that France had declined their spot in the final tournament. Therefore, the quota was given to Czechia as the next team available from Europe.

=== Uber Cup ===
Means of qualification	Date	Venue	Slot	Qualified teams
Host country	28 February 2021	Chengdu	1	China
2022 Uber Cup Champion	5–15 May 2022	Bangkok	1	South Korea
2024 All Africa Team Championships	12–15 February 2024	Cairo	1	~~South Africa~~^{3}
2024 All Africa Team Championships	12–15 February 2024	Cairo	1	Uganda^{3}
2024 Asia Team Championships	13–18 February 2024	Shah Alam	4	India
2024 Asia Team Championships	13–18 February 2024	Shah Alam	4	Indonesia
2024 Asia Team Championships	13–18 February 2024	Shah Alam	4	Japan
2024 Asia Team Championships	13–18 February 2024	Shah Alam	4	Thailand
2024 Pan Am Male & Female Cup	15–18 February 2024	São Paulo	1	Canada
2024 European Team Championships	14–18 February 2024	Łódź	4 - 3	Denmark
2024 European Team Championships	14–18 February 2024	Łódź	4 - 3	~~France~~^{3}
2024 European Team Championships	14–18 February 2024	Łódź	4 - 3	~~Scotland~~^{3}
2024 European Team Championships	14–18 February 2024	Łódź	4 - 3	~~Spain~~^{3}
2024 Oceania Team Championships	16–18 February 2024	Geelong	1	Australia
World Team Rankings	20 February 2024	Kuala Lumpur	3 + 3	Chinese Taipei
World Team Rankings	20 February 2024	Kuala Lumpur	3 + 3	United States
World Team Rankings	20 February 2024	Kuala Lumpur	3 + 3	Malaysia
World Team Rankings	20 February 2024	Kuala Lumpur	3 + 3	Hong Kong^{3}
World Team Rankings	20 February 2024	Kuala Lumpur	3 + 3	Singapore^{3}
World Team Rankings	20 February 2024	Kuala Lumpur	3 + 3	Mexico^{3}
Total			16	

Note

- ^3 On the day of the official draw, it was revealed that South Africa, France, Scotland and Spain had declined their spot in the final tournament. Therefore, the quotas were given to Uganda as the next highest ranked team for Africa and Hong Kong, Singapore, and Mexico as per the world team rankings.

== Draw ==
The draw for the tournament was conducted on 22 March at 15:00 CSTT, at Chengdu, China. The 16 men and 16 women teams were drawn into four groups of four.

For the Thomas Cup draw, the teams were allocated to four pots based on the World Team Rankings of 20 February 2024. Pot 1 contained the top seed China (which were assigned to position A1), the second seed Denmark (which were assigned to position D1) and the next two best teams, Indonesia and Japan. Pot 2 contained the next best four teams, Pot 3 contained the ninth to twelfth seeds, and Pot 4 for the thirteenth to sixteenth seeds.

A similar procedure was applied for the Uber Cup draw, where top seed China (were assigned to position A1), the second seed, South Korea (were assigned to position D1), Japan and Thailand were in Pot 1.

Thomas Cup

Pot 1	Pot 2	Pot 3	Pot 4
China; Denmark; Indonesia; Japan	Malaysia; India; Chinese Taipei; South Korea	Thailand; Canada; Hong Kong; Germany	England; Czech Republic; Algeria; Australia

Uber Cup

Pot 1	Pot 2	Pot 3	Pot 4
China; South Korea; Japan; Thailand	Indonesia; Chinese Taipei; India; Denmark	United States; Malaysia; Canada; Hong Kong	Singapore; Australia; Mexico; Uganda

== Tiebreakers ==
The rankings of teams in each group were determined per BWF Statutes Section 5.1, Article 16.3:

1. Number of matches won;
2. Match result between the teams in question;
3. Match difference in all group matches;
4. Game difference in all group matches;
5. Point difference in all group matches.

== Medal summary ==
=== Medalists ===
Event	Gold	Silver	Bronze
Thomas Cup	China; Shi Yuqi; Li Shifeng; Weng Hongyang; Lu Guangzu; Liang Weikeng; Wang Chang; Ou Xuanyi; Liu Yuchen; He Jiting; Ren Xiangyu	Indonesia; Anthony Sinisuka Ginting; Jonatan Christie; Chico Aura Dwi Wardoyo; Alwi Farhan; Fajar Alfian; Muhammad Rian Ardianto; Bagas Maulana; Muhammad Shohibul Fikri; Leo Rolly Carnando; Daniel Marthin	Malaysia; Lee Zii Jia; Leong Jun Hao; Cheam June Wei; Justin Hoh; Aaron Chia; Soh Wooi Yik; Goh Sze Fei; Nur Izzuddin; Choong Hon Jian; Muhammad Haikal
Thomas Cup	China; Shi Yuqi; Li Shifeng; Weng Hongyang; Lu Guangzu; Liang Weikeng; Wang Chang; Ou Xuanyi; Liu Yuchen; He Jiting; Ren Xiangyu	Indonesia; Anthony Sinisuka Ginting; Jonatan Christie; Chico Aura Dwi Wardoyo; Alwi Farhan; Fajar Alfian; Muhammad Rian Ardianto; Bagas Maulana; Muhammad Shohibul Fikri; Leo Rolly Carnando; Daniel Marthin	Chinese Taipei; Chou Tien-chen; Lin Chun-yi; Wang Tzu-wei; Lee Chia-hao; Lee Yang; Wang Chi-lin; Lee Jhe-huei; Yang Po-hsuan; Lu Ching-yao; Ye Hong-wei
Uber Cup	China; Chen Yufei; He Bingjiao; Han Yue; Wang Zhiyi; Chen Qingchen; Jia Yifan; Liu Shengshu; Tan Ning; Zhang Shuxian; Zheng Yu	Indonesia; Gregoria Mariska Tunjung; Ester Nurumi Tri Wardoyo; Komang Ayu Cahya Dewi; Ruzana; Apriyani Rahayu; Siti Fadia Silva Ramadhanti; Lanny Tria Mayasari; Ribka Sugiarto; Meilysa Trias Puspita Sari; Rachel Allessya Rose	Japan; Akane Yamaguchi; Aya Ohori; Nozomi Okuhara; Tomoka Miyazaki; Nami Matsuyama; Chiharu Shida; Wakana Nagahara; Ayako Sakuramoto; Rena Miyaura
Uber Cup	China; Chen Yufei; He Bingjiao; Han Yue; Wang Zhiyi; Chen Qingchen; Jia Yifan; Liu Shengshu; Tan Ning; Zhang Shuxian; Zheng Yu	Indonesia; Gregoria Mariska Tunjung; Ester Nurumi Tri Wardoyo; Komang Ayu Cahya Dewi; Ruzana; Apriyani Rahayu; Siti Fadia Silva Ramadhanti; Lanny Tria Mayasari; Ribka Sugiarto; Meilysa Trias Puspita Sari; Rachel Allessya Rose	South Korea; An Se-young; Sim Yu-jin; Kim Ga-ram; Kim Min-sun; Baek Ha-na; Lee So-hee; Kong Hee-yong; Jeong Na-eun; Kim Hye-jeong

=== Medal table ===
* Host nation (China)

Rank	Nation	Gold	Silver	Bronze	Total
1	China*	2	0	0	2
2	Indonesia	0	2	0	2
3	Chinese Taipei	0	0	1	1
3	Japan	0	0	1	1
3	Malaysia	0	0	1	1
3	South Korea	0	0	1	1
Totals (6 entries)		2	2	4	8

== Thomas Cup ==
=== Group stage ===
==== Group A ====
Pos	Team	Pld	W	L	MF	MA	MD	GF	GA	GD	PF	PA	PD	Pts	Qualification
1	China	3	3	0	13	2	+11	28	5	+23	671	415	+256	**3**	Advance to quarter-finals
2	South Korea	3	2	1	12	3	+9	25	8	+17	632	471	+161	**2**	Advance to quarter-finals
3	Canada	3	1	2	3	12	−9	8	24	−16	449	621	−172	**1**	
4	Australia	3	0	3	2	13	−11	4	28	−24	404	649	−245	**0**	

Source: Tournament software
Rules for classification: Tiebreakers

27 April 2024
8:30 UTC+8

**South Korea**	5–0	**Canada**
Report

Hi-Tech Zone Sports Centre Gymnasium Court 3, Chengdu

27 April 2024
13:00 UTC+8

**China**	5–0	**Australia**
Report

Hi-Tech Zone Sports Centre Gymnasium Court 1, Chengdu

28 April 2024
13:00 UTC+8

**South Korea**	5–0	**Australia**
Report

Hi-Tech Zone Sports Centre Gymnasium Court 4, Chengdu

28 April 2024
18:00 UTC+8

**China**	5–0	**Canada**
Report

Hi-Tech Zone Sports Centre Gymnasium Court 1, Chengdu

30 April 2024
9:30 UTC+8

**Canada**	3–2	**Australia**
Report

Hi-Tech Zone Sports Centre Gymnasium Court 3, Chengdu

30 April 2024
17:00 UTC+8

**China**	3–2	**South Korea**
Report

Hi-Tech Zone Sports Centre Gymnasium Court 1, Chengdu

==== Group B ====
Pos	Team	Pld	W	L	MF	MA	MD	GF	GA	GD	PF	PA	PD	Pts	Qualification
1	Japan	3	3	0	15	0	+15	30	4	+26	700	511	+189	**3**	Advance to quarter-finals
2	Chinese Taipei	3	2	1	8	7	+1	20	17	+3	720	646	+74	**2**	Advance to quarter-finals
3	Germany	3	1	2	4	11	−7	12	23	−11	604	687	−83	**1**	
4	Czech Republic	3	0	3	3	12	−9	8	26	−18	509	689	−180	**0**	

Source: Tournament software
Rules for classification: Tiebreakers

28 April 2024
8:30 UTC+8

**Japan**	5–0	**Czech Republic**
Report

Hi-Tech Zone Sports Centre Gymnasium Court 2, Chengdu

28 April 2024
13:00 UTC+8

**Chinese Taipei**	4–1	**Germany**
Report

Hi-Tech Zone Sports Centre Gymnasium Court 3, Chengdu

29 April 2024
17:00 UTC+8

**Japan**	5–0	**Germany**
Report

Hi-Tech Zone Sports Centre Gymnasium Court 1, Chengdu

29 April 2024
17:00 UTC+8

**Chinese Taipei**	4–1	**Czech Republic**
Report

Hi-Tech Zone Sports Centre Gymnasium Court 3, Chengdu

1 May 2024
17:00 UTC+8

**Japan**	5–0	**Chinese Taipei**
Report

Hi-Tech Zone Sports Centre Gymnasium Court 2, Chengdu

1 May 2024
17:00 UTC+8

**Germany**	3–2	**Czech Republic**
Report

Hi-Tech Zone Sports Centre Gymnasium Court 4, Chengdu

==== Group C ====
Pos	Team	Pld	W	L	MF	MA	MD	GF	GA	GD	PF	PA	PD	Pts	Qualification
1	Indonesia	3	3	0	13	2	+11	28	9	+19	735	598	+137	**3**	Advance to quarter-finals
2	India	3	2	1	10	5	+5	23	14	+9	733	645	+88	**2**	Advance to quarter-finals
3	Thailand	3	1	2	6	9	−3	15	20	−5	595	670	−75	**1**	
4	England	3	0	3	1	14	−13	5	28	−23	530	680	−150	**0**	

Source: Tournament software
Rules for classification: Tiebreakers

27 April 2024
18:00 UTC+8

**Indonesia**	5–0	**England**
Report

Hi-Tech Zone Sports Centre Gymnasium Court 1, Chengdu

27 April 2024
13:00 UTC+8

**India**	4–1	**Thailand**
Report

Hi-Tech Zone Sports Centre Gymnasium Court 2, Chengdu

29 April 2024
9:30 UTC+8

**Indonesia**	4–1	**Thailand**
Report

Hi-Tech Zone Sports Centre Gymnasium Court 2, Chengdu

29 April 2024
9:30 UTC+8

**India**	5–0	**England**
Report

Hi-Tech Zone Sports Centre Gymnasium Court 3, Chengdu

1 May 2024
17:00 UTC+8

**Indonesia**	4–1	**India**
Report

Hi-Tech Zone Sports Centre Gymnasium Court 1, Chengdu

1 May 2024
17:00 UTC+8

**Thailand**	4–1	**England**
Report

Hi-Tech Zone Sports Centre Gymnasium Court 3, Chengdu

==== Group D ====
Pos	Team	Pld	W	L	MF	MA	MD	GF	GA	GD	PF	PA	PD	Pts	Qualification
1	Denmark	3	3	0	13	2	+11	27	7	+20	700	469	+231	**3**	Advance to quarter-finals
2	Malaysia	3	2	1	12	3	+9	25	9	+16	669	541	+128	**2**	Advance to quarter-finals
3	Hong Kong	3	1	2	5	10	−5	14	20	−6	591	599	−8	**1**	
4	Algeria	3	0	3	0	15	−15	0	30	−30	279	630	−351	**0**	

Source: Tournament software
Rules for classification: Tiebreakers

27 April 2024
08:30 UTC+8

**Malaysia**	5–0	**Hong Kong**
Report

Hi-Tech Zone Sports Centre Gymnasium Court 2, Chengdu

27 April 2024
13:00 UTC+8

**Denmark**	5–0	**Algeria**
Report

Hi-Tech Zone Sports Centre Gymnasium Court 3, Chengdu

28 April 2024
13:00 UTC+8

**Denmark**	5–0	**Hong Kong**
Report

Hi-Tech Zone Sports Centre Gymnasium Court 1, Chengdu

28 April 2024
18:00 UTC+8

**Malaysia**	5–0	**Algeria**
Report

Hi-Tech Zone Sports Centre Gymnasium Court 4, Chengdu

30 April 2024
9:30 UTC+8

**Hong Kong**	5–0	**Algeria**
Report

Hi-Tech Zone Sports Centre Gymnasium Court 4, Chengdu

30 April 2024
17:00 UTC+8

**Denmark**	3–2	**Malaysia**
Report

Hi-Tech Zone Sports Centre Gymnasium Court 2, Chengdu

=== Knockout stage ===
The knockout stage of the tournament started from 2 May 2024 on which the quarter-finals were held. Semi-finals were held on 4 May 2024 while the finals was held on 5 May 2024. Below is the bracket for the knockout round of the tournament, teams in bold denote match winners.

The draw was conducted on 1 May 2024, after the last match of the group stage.

Quarter-finals
**China**	**3**
India	1
Japan	1
**Malaysia**	**3**
South Korea	1
**Indonesia**	**3**
**Chinese Taipei**	**3**
Denmark	1

Semi-finals
**China**	**3**
Malaysia	1
**Indonesia**	**3**
Chinese Taipei	0

Final
**China**	**3**
Indonesia	1

==== Quarter-finals ====
2 May 2024
17:00 UTC+8

**China**	3–1	**India**
Report

Hi-Tech Zone Sports Centre Gymnasium Court 1, Chengdu

2 May 2024
17:00 UTC+8

**Japan**	1–3	**Malaysia**
Report

Hi-Tech Zone Sports Centre Gymnasium Court 2, Chengdu

3 May 2024
17:00 UTC+8

**South Korea**	1–3	**Indonesia**
Report

Hi-Tech Zone Sports Centre Gymnasium Court 2, Chengdu

3 May 2024
17:00 UTC+8

**Chinese Taipei**	3–1	**Denmark**
Report

Hi-Tech Zone Sports Centre Gymnasium Court 1, Chengdu

==== Semi-finals ====
4 May 2024
17:00 UTC+8

**China**	3–1	**Malaysia**
Report

Hi-Tech Zone Sports Centre Gymnasium Court 1, Chengdu

4 May 2024
17:00 UTC+8

**Indonesia**	3–0	**Chinese Taipei**
Report

Hi-Tech Zone Sports Centre Gymnasium Court 2, Chengdu

==== Final ====
5 May 2024
18:00 UTC+8

**China**	3–1	**Indonesia**
Report

Hi-Tech Zone Sports Centre Gymnasium Court 1, Chengdu

2024 Thomas Cup champions

**China**
**11th title**

=== Final ranking ===
Pos	Team	Pld	W	L	Pts	MD	GD	PD	Final result
1st place, gold medalist(s)	China	6	6	0	6	+17	+34	+351	Champions
2nd place, silver medalist(s)	Indonesia	6	5	1	5	+14	+23	+138	Runners-up
3rd place, bronze medalist(s)	Malaysia	5	3	2	3	+9	+16	+145	Eliminated in semi-finals
3rd place, bronze medalist(s)	Chinese Taipei	5	3	2	3	0	+2	+64	Eliminated in semi-finals
5	Japan	4	3	1	3	+13	+22	+138	Eliminated in quarter-finals
6	Denmark	4	3	1	3	+9	+16	+227	Eliminated in quarter-finals
7	South Korea	4	2	2	2	+7	+15	+145	Eliminated in quarter-finals
8	India	4	2	2	2	+3	+6	+62	Eliminated in quarter-finals
9	Thailand	3	1	2	1	−3	−5	−75	Eliminated in group stage
10	Hong Kong	3	1	2	1	−5	−6	−8	Eliminated in group stage
11	Germany	3	1	2	1	−7	−11	−83	Eliminated in group stage
12	Canada	3	1	2	1	−9	−16	−172	Eliminated in group stage
13	Czech Republic	3	0	3	0	−9	−18	−180	Eliminated in group stage
14	Australia	3	0	3	0	−11	−24	−245	Eliminated in group stage
15	England	3	0	3	0	−13	−23	−150	Eliminated in group stage
16	Algeria	3	0	3	0	−15	−30	−351	Eliminated in group stage

== Uber Cup ==
=== Group stage ===
==== Group A ====
Pos	Team	Pld	W	L	MF	MA	MD	GF	GA	GD	PF	PA	PD	Pts	Qualification
1	China	3	3	0	15	0	+15	30	0	+30	630	305	+325	**3**	Advance to quarter-finals
2	India	3	2	1	8	7	+1	16	14	+2	510	520	−10	**2**	Advance to quarter-finals
3	Canada	3	1	2	6	9	−3	12	18	−6	496	602	−106	**1**	
4	Singapore	3	0	3	1	14	−13	2	28	−26	424	633	−209	**0**	

Source: Tournament software
Rules for classification: Tiebreakers

27 April 2024
08:30 UTC+8

**China**	5–0	**Singapore**
Report

Hi-Tech Zone Sports Centre Gymnasium Court 1, Chengdu

27 April 2024
13:00 UTC+8

**India**	4–1	**Canada**
Report

Hi-Tech Zone Sports Centre Gymnasium Court 4, Chengdu

28 April 2024
08:30 UTC+8

**India**	4–1	**Singapore**
Report

Hi-Tech Zone Sports Centre Gymnasium Court 3, Chengdu

28 April 2024
13:00 UTC+8

**China**	5–0	**Canada**
Report

Hi-Tech Zone Sports Centre Gymnasium Court 2, Chengdu

30 April 2024
09:30 UTC+8

**China**	5–0	**India**
Report

Hi-Tech Zone Sports Centre Gymnasium Court 1, Chengdu

30 April 2024
17:00 UTC+8

**Canada**	5–0	**Singapore**
Report

Hi-Tech Zone Sports Centre Gymnasium Court 3, Chengdu

==== Group B ====
Pos	Team	Pld	W	L	MF	MA	MD	GF	GA	GD	PF	PA	PD	Pts	Qualification
1	Thailand	3	3	0	15	0	+15	30	1	+29	650	368	+282	**3**	Advance to quarter-finals
2	Chinese Taipei	3	2	1	8	7	+1	17	15	+2	584	565	+19	**2**	Advance to quarter-finals
3	Malaysia	3	1	2	5	10	−5	11	21	−10	519	571	−52	**1**	
4	Australia	3	0	3	2	13	−11	5	26	−21	379	628	−249	**0**	

Source: Tournament software
Rules for classification: Tiebreakers

28 April 2024
08:30 UTC+8

**Chinese Taipei**	4–1	**Malaysia**
Report

Hi-Tech Zone Sports Centre Gymnasium Court 1, Chengdu

28 April 2024
08:30 UTC+8

**Thailand**	5–0	**Australia**
Report

Hi-Tech Zone Sports Centre Gymnasium Court 4, Chengdu

29 April 2024
09:30 UTC+8

**Chinese Taipei**	4–1	**Australia**
Report

Hi-Tech Zone Sports Centre Gymnasium Court 4, Chengdu

29 April 2024
17:00 UTC+8

**Thailand**	5–0	**Malaysia**
Report

Hi-Tech Zone Sports Centre Gymnasium Court 2, Chengdu

1 May 2024
09:30 UTC+8

**Thailand**	5–0	**Chinese Taipei**
Report

Hi-Tech Zone Sports Centre Gymnasium Court 2, Chengdu

1 May 2024
09:30 UTC+8

**Malaysia**	4–1	**Australia**
Report

Hi-Tech Zone Sports Centre Gymnasium Court 3, Chengdu

==== Group C ====
Pos	Team	Pld	W	L	MF	MA	MD	GF	GA	GD	PF	PA	PD	Pts	Qualification
1	Japan	3	3	0	13	2	+11	28	8	+20	705	453	+252	**3**	Advance to quarter-finals
2	Indonesia	3	2	1	12	3	+9	26	10	+16	695	533	+162	**2**	Advance to quarter-finals
3	Hong Kong	3	1	2	5	10	−5	14	20	−6	564	558	+6	**1**	
4	Uganda	3	0	3	0	15	−15	0	30	−30	210	630	−420	**0**	

Source: Tournament software
Rules for classification: Tiebreakers

27 April 2024
08:30 UTC+8

**Japan**	5–0	**Uganda**
Report

Hi-Tech Zone Sports Centre Gymnasium Court 4, Chengdu

27 April 2024
13:00 UTC+8

**Indonesia**	5–0	**Hong Kong**
Report

Hi-Tech Zone Sports Centre Gymnasium Court 2, Chengdu

29 April 2024
09:30 UTC+8

**Japan**	5–0	**Hong Kong**
Report

Hi-Tech Zone Sports Centre Gymnasium Court 1, Chengdu

29 April 2024
17:00 UTC+8

**Indonesia**	5–0	**Uganda**
Report

Hi-Tech Zone Sports Centre Gymnasium Court 4, Chengdu

1 May 2024
09:30 UTC+8

**Japan**	3–2	**Indonesia**
Report

Hi-Tech Zone Sports Centre Gymnasium Court 1, Chengdu

1 May 2024
09:30 UTC+8

**Hong Kong**	5–0	**Uganda**
Report

Hi-Tech Zone Sports Centre Gymnasium Court 4, Chengdu

==== Group D ====
Pos	Team	Pld	W	L	MF	MA	MD	GF	GA	GD	PF	PA	PD	Pts	Qualification
1	South Korea	3	3	0	15	0	+15	30	1	+29	651	395	+256	**3**	Advance to quarter-finals
2	Denmark	3	2	1	10	5	+5	21	13	+8	655	511	+144	**2**	Advance to quarter-finals
3	United States	3	1	2	5	10	−5	13	20	−7	526	558	−32	**1**	
4	Mexico	3	0	3	0	15	−15	0	30	−30	262	630	−368	**0**	

Source: Tournament software
Rules for classification: Tiebreakers

27 April 2024
18:00 UTC+8

**South Korea**	5–0	**Mexico**
Report

Hi-Tech Zone Sports Centre Gymnasium Court 3, Chengdu

27 April 2024
18:00 UTC+8

**Denmark**	5–0	**United States**
Report

Hi-Tech Zone Sports Centre Gymnasium Court 4, Chengdu

28 April 2024
18:00 UTC+8

**Denmark**	5–0	**Mexico**
Report

Hi-Tech Zone Sports Centre Gymnasium Court 2, Chengdu

28 April 2024
18:00 UTC+8

**South Korea**	5–0	**United States**
Report

Hi-Tech Zone Sports Centre Gymnasium Court 3, Chengdu

30 April 2024
09:30 UTC+8

**South Korea**	5–0	**Denmark**
Report

Hi-Tech Zone Sports Centre Gymnasium Court 2, Chengdu

30 April 2024
17:00 UTC+8

**United States**	5–0	**Mexico**
Report

Hi-Tech Zone Sports Centre Gymnasium Court 4, Chengdu

=== Knockout stage ===
The knockout stage of the tournament started from 2 May 2024 on which the quarter-finals were held. Semi-finals were held on 4 May 2024 while the finals was held on 5 May 2024. Below is the bracket for the knockout round of the tournament, teams in bold denote match winners.

The draw was conducted on 1 May 2024, after the last match of the group stage.

Quarter-finals
**China**	**3**
Denmark	0
**Japan**	**3**
India	0
**Indonesia**	**3**
Thailand	0
Chinese Taipei	0
**South Korea**	**3**

Semi-finals
**China**	**3**
Japan	0
**Indonesia**	**3**
South Korea	2

Final
**China**	**3**
Indonesia	0

==== Quarter-finals ====
2 May 2024
09:30 UTC+8

**China**	3–0	**Denmark**
Report

Hi-Tech Zone Sports Centre Gymnasium Court 1, Chengdu

2 May 2024
09:30 UTC+8

**Japan**	3–0	**India**
Report

Hi-Tech Zone Sports Centre Gymnasium Court 2, Chengdu

3 May 2024
09:30 UTC+8

**Indonesia**	3–0	**Thailand**
Report

Hi-Tech Zone Sports Centre Gymnasium Court 1, Chengdu

3 May 2024
09:30 UTC+8

**Chinese Taipei**	0–3	**South Korea**
Report

Hi-Tech Zone Sports Centre Gymnasium Court 2, Chengdu

==== Semi-finals ====
4 May 2024
09:30 UTC+8

**China**	3–0	**Japan**
Report

Hi-Tech Zone Sports Centre Gymnasium Court 1, Chengdu

4 May 2024
09:30 UTC+8

**Indonesia**	3–2	**South Korea**
Report

Hi-Tech Zone Sports Centre Gymnasium Court 2, Chengdu

==== Final ====
5 May 2024
09:30 UTC+8

**China**	3–0	**Indonesia**
Report

Hi-Tech Zone Sports Centre Gymnasium Court 1, Chengdu

2024 Uber Cup champions

**China**
**16th title**

=== Final ranking ===
Pos	Team	Pld	W	L	Pts	MD	GD	PD	Final result
1st place, gold medalist(s)	China	6	6	0	6	+24	+46	+436	Champions
2nd place, silver medalist(s)	Indonesia	6	4	2	4	+10	+16	+137	Runners-up
3rd place, bronze medalist(s)	South Korea	5	4	1	4	+17	+35	+316	Eliminated in semi-finals
3rd place, bronze medalist(s)	Japan	5	4	1	4	+11	+20	+279	Eliminated in semi-finals
5	Thailand	4	3	1	3	+12	+24	+264	Eliminated in quarter-finals
6	Denmark	4	2	2	2	+2	+2	+102	Eliminated in quarter-finals
7	India	4	2	2	2	−2	−3	−65	Eliminated in quarter-finals
8	Chinese Taipei	4	2	2	2	−2	−4	−39	Eliminated in quarter-finals
9	Canada	3	1	2	1	−3	−6	−106	Eliminated in group stage
10	Hong Kong	3	1	2	1	−5	−6	+6	Eliminated in group stage
11	United States	3	1	2	1	−5	−7	−32	Eliminated in group stage
12	Malaysia	3	1	2	1	−5	−10	−52	Eliminated in group stage
13	Australia	3	0	3	0	−11	−21	−249	Eliminated in group stage
14	Singapore	3	0	3	0	−13	−26	−209	Eliminated in group stage
15	Mexico	3	0	3	0	−15	−30	−368	Eliminated in group stage
16	Uganda	3	0	3	0	−15	−30	−420	Eliminated in group stage
